= RNLB Margaret Russell Fraser =

Former British rescue ship (launched 1986)

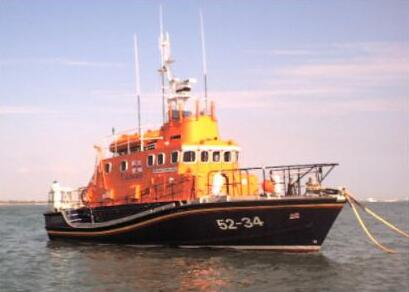
- RNLB Margaret Russell Fraser (ON 1108)

History

British RNLI Flag
- Owner: Royal National Lifeboat Institution (RNLI)
- Builder: VT Halmatic
- Official Number: ON 1108
- Donor: Legacy of Miss Margaret R. Fraser Glasgow
- Station: Relief Fleet (1986 – 2002); Calshot
- Cost: £417,616
- Laid down: 1985
- Launched: 1986
- Christened: 11 June 1986
- Completed: 1986
- Acquired: 1986
- In service: 1986 – 2004
- Fate: Sold out of fleet in 2004 to ICE-SAR Iceland

General characteristics
- Class & type: Arun-class
- Type: Motor lifeboat
- Displacement: 32 long tons (33 t)
- Length: 54 ft (16 m) overall
- Beam: 17 ft (5.2 m)
- Draught: 5 ft (1.5 m)
- Propulsion: 2 × Caterpillar 460 hp (343 kW) diesel engines
- Speed: 18.5 knots (21.3 mph; 34.3 km/h)
- Range: 250 nmi (460 km)
- Crew: 6

RNLB Margaret Russell Fraser was an Arun-class lifeboat which served in the Royal National Lifeboat Institution (RNLI) Relief Fleet for 16 years before being placed on station at the Calshot Lifeboat Station in Calshot, Hampshire, United Kingdom.

== Procurement ==
Margaret Russell Fraser was built VT Halmatic in Portsmouth to serve in the RNLI’s Relief Fleet of five of the Arun-class lifeboats. She was fitted out and tested trials at Souter Marine in Cowes before being handed over to the RNLI in April 1986. Much of the cost for the lifeboat was met with a bequest from Margaret R. Fraser, for whom the lifeboat was named at a ceremony in her hometown of Glasgow, Scotland in June 1986.

== Royal National Lifeboat Institution service ==
=== Relief fleet ===
The Margaret Russell Fraser was first posted to Ireland, where she spent the next three years stationed at Rosslare Harbour, Ballycotton, Valentia, and finally Aran Island. In September 1989 she was sent across the Irish Sea to Yarmouth Lifeboat Station on the Isle of Wight, her first English station posting.

While at Yarmouth she was involved in the October 1989 rescue of the RoRo cargo vessel Al Kwather 1. The Margaret Russell Fraser launched into gale force 9 winds to assist the Swanage Rother-class lifeboat RNLB Horace Clarkson (ON 1047), which had been on the scene since 11.30 am. The Margaret Russell Fraser arrived on the scene at 3.10 pm, but both vessels soon departed as the Al Kwather 1 appeared to be in no immediate danger.

Just after midnight, the captain of the Al Kwather 1 requested assistance again following engine trouble. When the two lifeboats returned, the ship was in complete darkness, listing to port and rolling violently. The Margaret Russell Fraser approached from the stern and rescued one of pair of crewmen hanging on to a cargo net. The coxswain of the Margaret Russell Fraser was awarded an RNLI Bronze Medal for his part in the service.

=== Calshot Lifeboat Station ===
In 2002 the Margaret Russell Fraser was taken out of the relief fleet and placed on her sole permanent posting at Calshot Lifeboat Station in Hampshire, where she replaced the Brede-class lifeboat RNLB Safeway (ON 1104). She remained on service at Calshot for just over two years before she was replaced by the Arun-class lifeboat RNLB Mabel Williams (ON 1159).

== Icelandic service ==
In 2004 after 19 years service with the RNLI the Margaret Russell Fraser was sold out of the service. She was purchased by the Icelandic Association for Search and Rescue who renamed her Ingibjörg. She has been stationed at Höfn on the south east coast of Iceland since 2005.
