= Kirkham-Williams X =

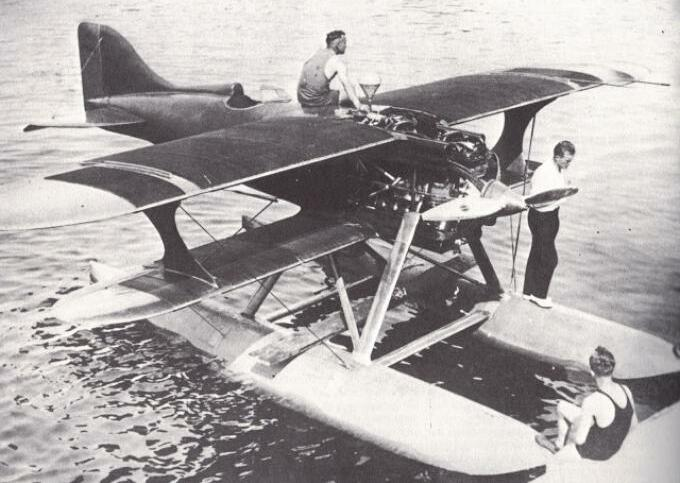

General information
- Type: Floatplane Schneider Cup aspirant
- National origin: US
- Manufacturer: Kirkham Products Co.
- Designer: Alford Williams
- Number built: 1

History
- First flight: 31 August 1927

The 1927 Kirkham-Williams X or Kirkham-Williams Racer was designed as a private US contender for the 1927 Schneider Trophy. Though it flew just before the contest, it was still under development and was withdrawn. Soon after it was modified into a landplane, seeking to set a new speed record. Some high speed flights were made but no official record was set.

== Design and development ==
The Kirkham-Williams Racer was a single bay sesquiplane. It used a thin airfoil section and had constant chord wings with elliptical tips. Both upper and lower wings were mounted to the fuselage, with a gap of 41.5 in (1.05 m). Single outward-leaning interplane struts were constructed around dural and spruce frames, with a plywood covering. There were ailerons on both upper and lower wings.

The Racer was powered by a 1,250 hp (930 kW) water-cooled, X-24 cylinder Packard X-2775 loaned by the US Navy, a new design based on pair of V-12s with a common crankshaft. Carefully streamlined within a contour-following cowling, it was cooled by surface radiators on the wings formed from inverted (on the upper surfaces) T-section tubes running chordwise, their horizontals acting as the surface with the verticals projecting 0.344 in (8.7 mm) above. Together with similar oil cooling radiators, they covered almost the entire wing surface. Later wind tunnel tests showed the corrugations doubled the wing's drag, reducing the Racer's top speed by 20 mph (32 km/h; 17 kn). Behind the engine the fuselage was a laminated spruce monocoque with an open cockpit aft of the wings faired rearwards into an integral fin with a rectangular rudder. A mid-fuselage mounted, wire-braced tailplane carried divided elevators.

Each 21 ft 3 in (6.48 m) long and 40 in (1,000 mm) wide plywood float had a concave V-bottom, with a single step 10 ft 6 in (3.20 m) back from the nose. Each float was mounted on two steel struts, enclosed in dural sheet fairings. The forward strut was joined at the side of the engine mounting and the rear one met its opposite partner on the fuselage underside centre-line. Diagonal struts from the feet of the forward struts on the float joined the top of the rear struts to provide cross-bracing and two horizontal struts connected the floats together.

== Operational history ==
The first trials on water, in Manhasset Bay, did not start until 31 July 1927. Spray problems required float modifications and the Racer was not back on the water until 17 August. With the Schneider Cup scheduled for Venice on the 23 September, Williams requested a delay but this was rejected by the UK, so he withdrew from the contest on 9 September.

The Racer's first flight, delayed by bad weather, was on 31 August. It was 420 lb (190 kg) overweight and had engine cooling problems. As speeds increased, Williams reported instabilities above 200 mph (320 km/h; 170 kn) associated with the floats. One later run was unofficially timed at 275 mph (443 km/h; 239 kn).

Afterwards the Racer swapped floats for conventional, fixed, wheeled landing gear with faired legs. A speed of 322 mph (518 km/h; 280 kn) was unofficially recorded on 6 November 1927, greater than the current absolute record (298 mph (480 km/h; 259 kn)). However, the 1.9 mi (3 km) was only flown in one direction and a 40 mph (64 km/h; 35 kn) wind was blowing. Williams later estimated that the still air speed that day was 287 mph (462 km/h; 249 kn).

These disappointing speeds led to the wind-tunnel tests that revealed the drag of the wing radiators. The lessons of the 1927 biplane with its Packard engine and mount went into the monoplane 1929 Williams Mercury Racer which Williams originally designed to gain the 1.9 mi (3 km) speed record. He was pressured into offering it, on floats, for the 1929 Schneider contest but in the end it was not taken to Calshot for the contest and was abandoned.

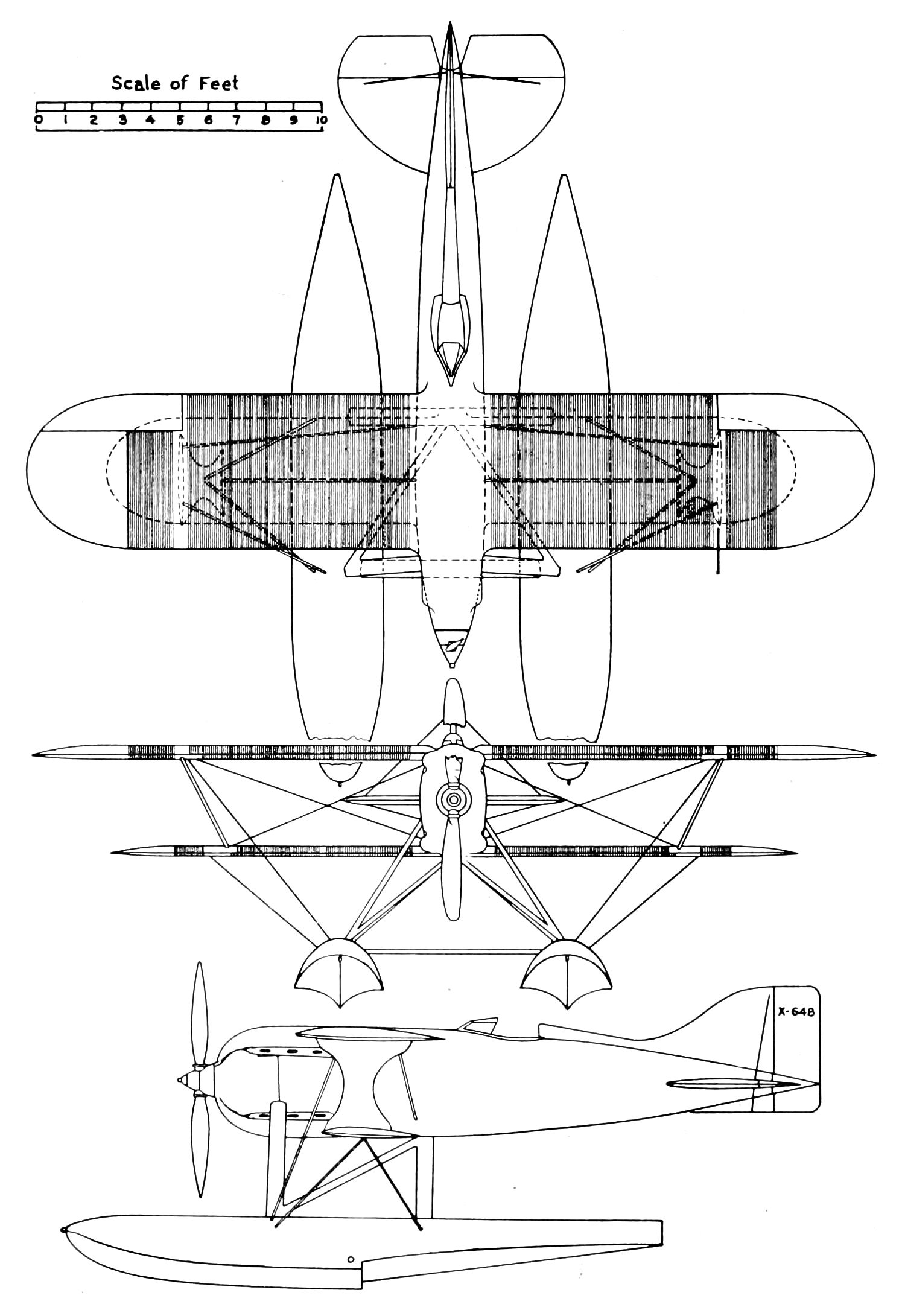

== Specifications (floatplane) ==
Data from Aero Digest, September 1927

General characteristics

- Crew: one
- Length: 26 ft 9 in (8.15 m) overall, including floats. Fuselage length 22 ft 9 in (6.93 m)
- Upper wingspan: 29 ft 10 in (9.09 m)
- Lower wingspan: 24 ft 3 in (7.39 m)
- Height: 10 ft 9 in (3.28 m)
- Wing area: 142 sq ft (13.2 m^{2}) upper; lower 75 sq ft (7.0 m^{2})
- Airfoil: Curtiss C-62
- Empty weight: 4,000 lb (1,814 kg)
- Max takeoff weight: 4,600 lb (2,087 kg)
- Fuel capacity: 60 US gal (50 imp gal; 230 L)
- Powerplant: 1 × Packard X-2775 water-cooled X-24 cylinder engine, capacity 2,775 cu in (45.47 L), 1,250 hp (930 kW) at 2,700 rpm
- Propellers: 2-bladed, 8 ft 6 in (2.59 m) diameter Standard Steel duraluminum
