= Icelandic Association for Search and Rescue =

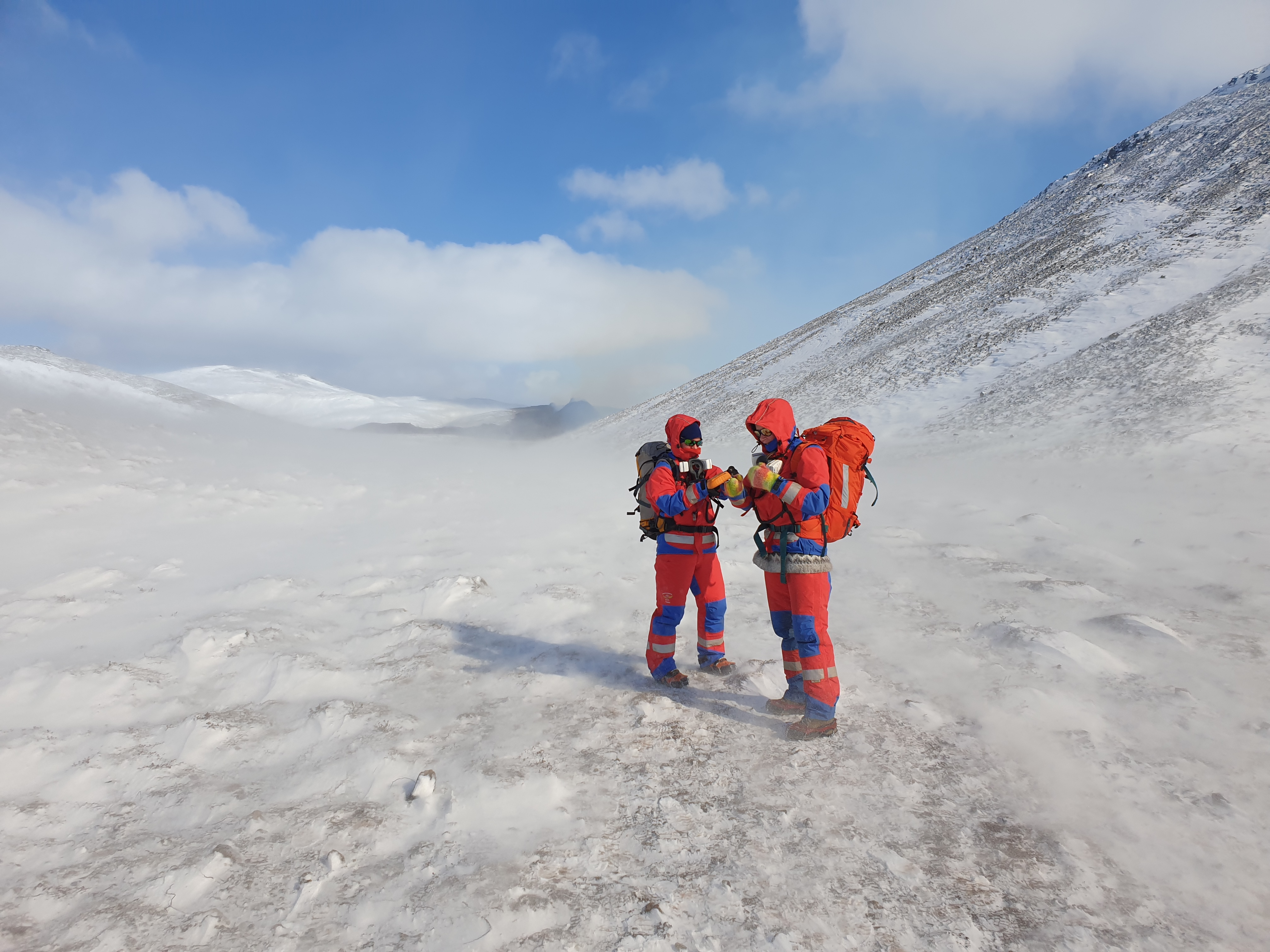
Two rescue team members in field work during the Fagradalsfjall eruption in 2021.

Slysavarnarfélagið Landsbjörg or the Icelandic Association for Search and Rescue (ICE-SAR) is a national association of rescue units and accident prevention divisions. Its member organizations consist of 99 rescue units, 70 accident prevention and women's divisions and 50 youth sections. Altogether the association has about 10,000 volunteer members and are present in most towns. Although the rescue teams function as a kind of public service, they are not supported or paid for by the government but by donation.

== History ==
Slysavarnafélagið Landsbjörg has roots going back to 1918 with the formation of a rescue team organized by women in the Westman Islands who sought to establish a lifeline for husbands working in the dangerous fishing industry. Search and rescue teams did not become widespread, however, until after the crash of Loftleiðir airplane Geysir[is] on Vatnajökull in September 1950. Most of those on board managed to survive but were stranded in the wilderness. After a failed rescue attempt by American military forces, a civilian force formed to organize a rescue on foot and ski. The drama of the event helped start a network of local rescue teams that sought to help in cases of similar emergencies.

== Rescue units ==
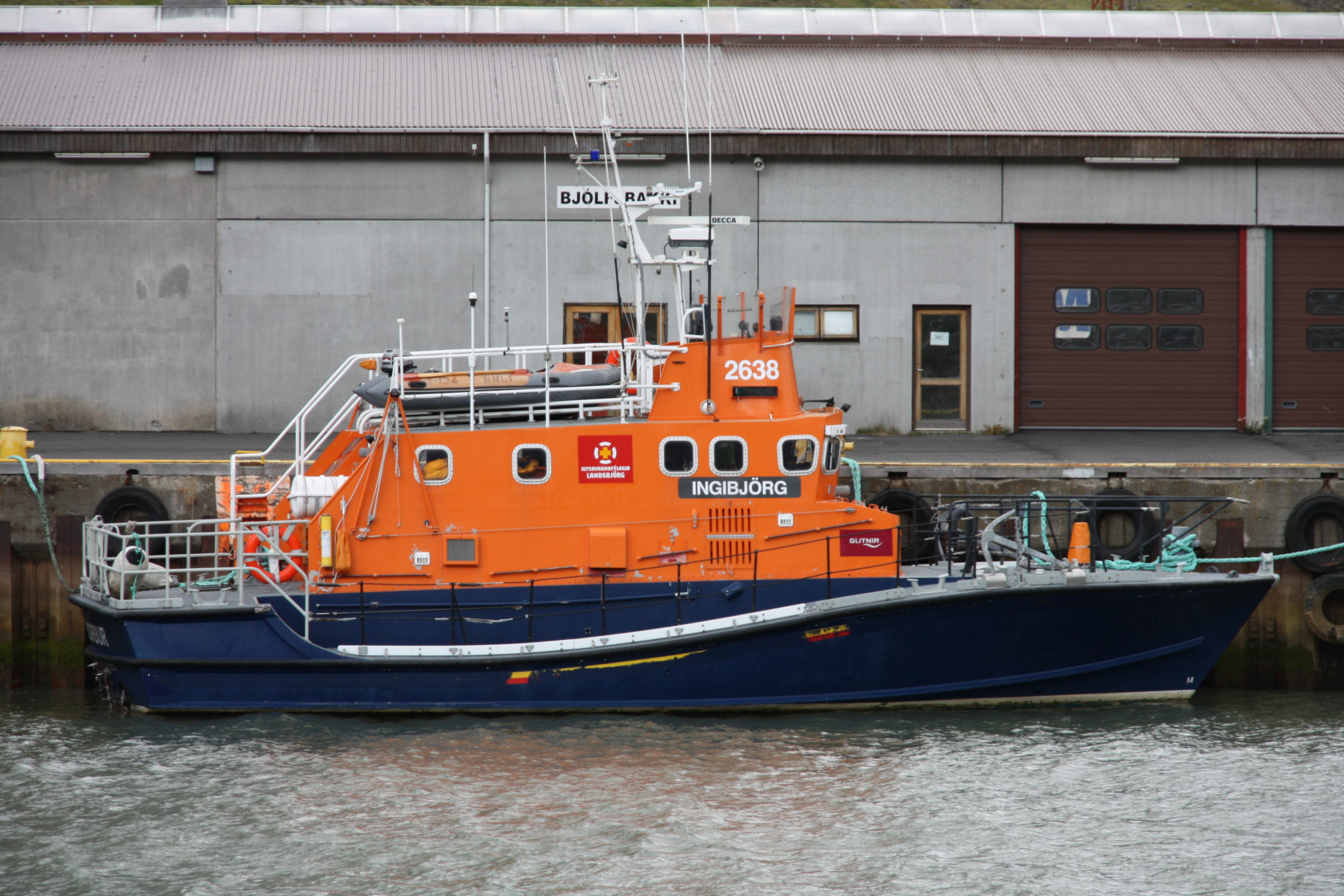
Ingibjörg, a ship of Slysavarnarfélagið Landsbjörg, at port in Seyðisfjörður, Iceland

ICE-SAR has 99 rescue units, located throughout Iceland. They comprise over 3,000 volunteers who are always on standby 24/7 for emergencies. The rescue teams are specialized in search and rescue both on land and at sea. To be able to address the diverse tasks, the rescue teams are well educated in their fields and thoroughly trained. They strive to outfit their people to the highest standard, with both personal gear and expensive rescue equipment like cars, snowmobiles and boats. In recent years, specialization within rescue teams has increased, making the work more purposeful: land groups, sea groups, diving groups, advance groups, high-angle rescue groups, and search dog groups.

=== International urban search and rescue (USAR) unit ===
ICE-SAR operates an international urban rescue unit, staffed by volunteers from the various search and rescue units in Iceland. The team first responded to an international crisis in 1999 when it assisted in rescuing survivors of the 1999 İzmit earthquake in Turkey.

In September 2009, the unit received its INSARAG External Classification certification as a medium team. Only a few months later, the unit was put to the test during the 2010 Haiti earthquake where it was the first rescue team to arrive on the scene following, arriving within 24 hours of the earthquake.

Besides its international missions the unit has taken part in rescues following earthquakes and avalanches in its native Iceland.

==== International missions ====
- 1999 İzmit earthquake
- 2003 Boumerdès earthquake
- 2004 Al Hoceima earthquake
- 2010 Haiti earthquake
- 2023 Turkey-Syria earthquake

== Accident prevention ==
The Accident Prevention (AP) Department works to prevent all kinds of accidents. This is done in various ways with or without help of other organisations or companies that work in this field. Some tasks are done on a yearly basis like operating traffic wardens, conducting surveys on safety equipment in vehicles for children, safety education for children in home and farms, education forums for Accident Prevention Branches, as well as education in firework safety during the New Year.

=== Accident prevention branches ===
In ICE-SAR there are 70 AP Branches in the country. Of those about 40 are very active. The work of the AP Branches is to promote accident prevention in the local community and support the local rescue team. The AP branches work on different assignments depending on the needs of the local people. About 15 years ago the main mission was to raise funds for the local rescue teams.

=== Life skills ===
In primary schools, a new type of class has been implemented, called Life Skills. The purpose of the Life Skills class is to make the children well educated, informed and responsible individuals in matters concerning daily life. For example, food habits, use of money, the way to avoid fight and drugs, use of alcohol, smoking, use of contraceptives and accident prevention and discussed. In this class there has been lack of information concerning accident prevention, and the department has been preparing teaching materials to make that part possible. It is for children from nine to eleven years old and given by ICE-SAR to schools, for that age group. The teaching materials tell a story about an elf from out of space that makes a crash landing in Iceland. He comes from the planet Varslys and knows nothing about the way to live in Icelandic society. But he is helped by Icelandic children and they teach him to adapt to the way of life in Iceland and prevent accidents.

=== Surveys about use of children safety equipment in vehicles ===
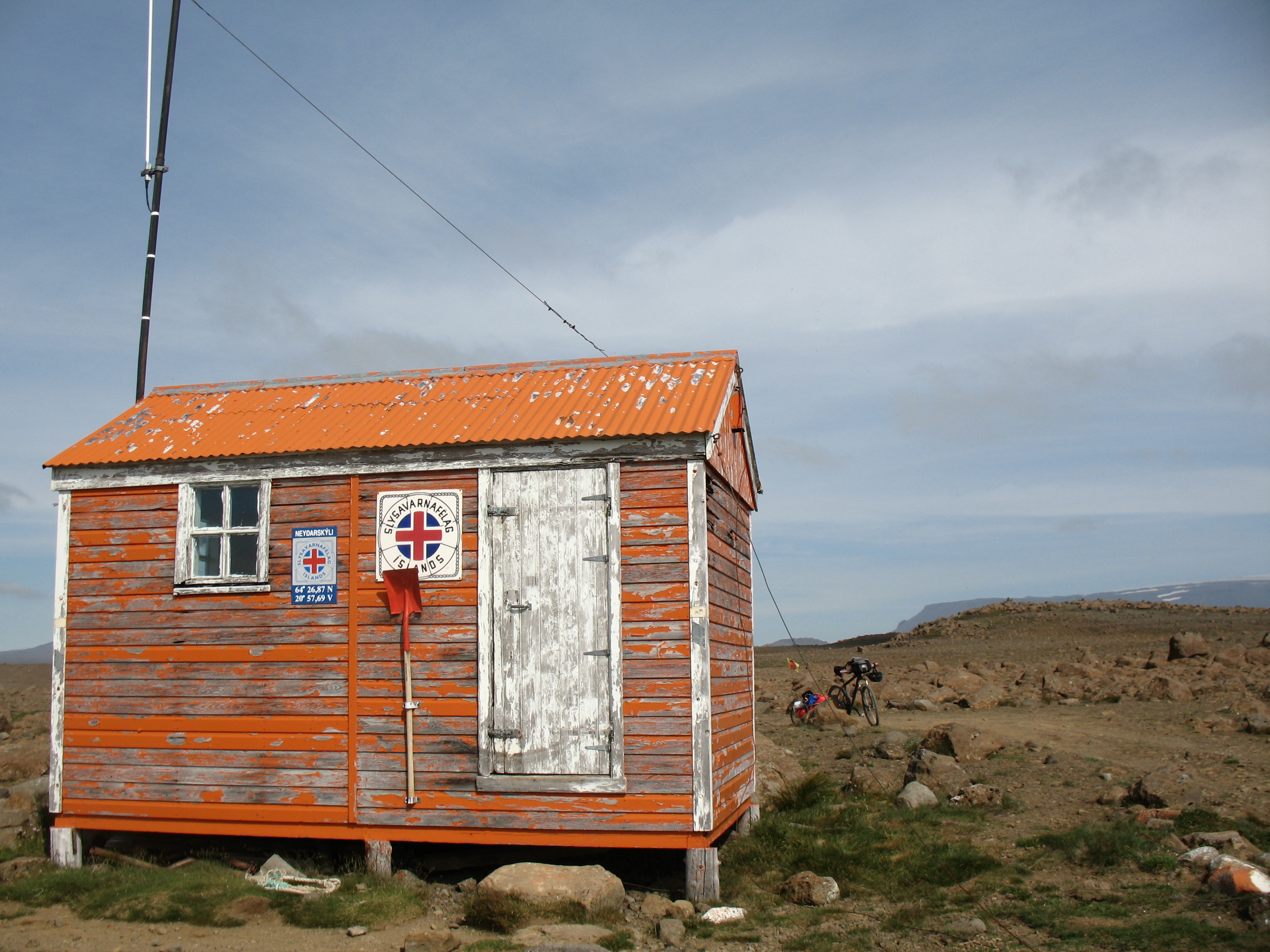
Emergency hut in Kaldidalur, 2008

For seven years ICE-SAR, in cooperation with several other organisations and the Traffic safety council, has been conducting surveys of the use of safety equipment for children in vehicles. The survey has been conducted outside kindergartens in 30 local authorities by members of ICE-SAR, AP branches. In 2002, 10% of children were not fastened and 13% were only fastened in safety belts. This contrasts with 1996 when the first survey was conducted, in which 28% of the children were not fastened.

=== Emergency shelters ===
Since early in the 20th century, ICE-SAR has been building Emergency shelters. This was begun because of a serious accident which occurred on the remote coastline. In 1960, the use of these shelters became commonplace with tourists, and some were built in mountain areas. Today most of these shelters are used as emergency shelters for tourists, and ICE-SAR units own them and use them as accident prevention.

== Youth sections ==
Within ICE-SAR, there are between 40- 50 youth sections that are spread around Iceland. The youth sections play an important role in the association because of their importance for future recruitment into the rescue teams. Therefore, ICE-SAR provides opportunities for young people of age 14 and over, to learn and practice first aid, orienteering, mountaineering, accident prevention and search and rescue on land and sea.

There are about 10-20 youths in each youth group. All the youth groups have at least two youth leaders, which guide them in different activities. The young people are in the youth section until they are 18 years old, then they can join the rescue teams and start a more heavy training.

The groups have meetings every week and often go on weekend trips, and in the summer they come together to a national camp that is held in different place every year. It is a camp that gives all ICE-SAR youths opportunity to meet for one weekend and do all kinds of outdoor activities together and have fun. It is held by different youth groups and has various themes each year.

The rescue teams provides them all the equipment for the youth work, they have meetings in their facilities and when the youths go on trips the rescue team helps them out with transportation and other things.

=== Youth exchanges ===
The groups take part in youth exchange in Iceland and in Europe. There are about 3 groups that do the exchange every year. The association began hosting volunteers from Europe in 2003.

=== Youth outdoors school ===
Over the summer months, ICE-SAR runs an outdoor school at their training center Gufuskálar in Snæfellsnes. It gives young people in Iceland opportunity to see and learn about the youth groups and rescue teams, and often they join a youth group after being at the camp. This camp is a six days course where the participants learn how to use compass, first aid, how to be on a boat and up sailing, and many other activities. Also there are shorter camps and other special ordered courses for school kids. The groups who come can choose from great amount of activities what they want to learn and do beforehand.

=== Youth leaders ===
All the sections have leaders, they carry out and help the youths organize all the work that the youth group does. Also there is a nation leader meeting every year and they take a part in youth leader courses to become better leaders. The association also gives out a handbook for youth leaders, and they participate in short study visits to Europe in connection with youth exchange. They are most often members in the rescue teams.

=== Youth supervisor ===
There is one full employed youth supervisor at ICE-SAR headquarters. His work is to host leaders meetings, courses and coordinate, help and be an assistant for the leaders and the youth sections. He also runs the outdoor school at the ICE-SAR training center and helps planning the national camp and the youth exchange. His work deals with all youth projects that come to ICE-SAR and service's all ICE-SAR youth groups.

== Rescue school ==
The association's Icelandic Rescue School is housed in Skógarhlíð headquarters, offering numerous courses at rural locations. The school's curriculum is very diverse, being divided into basic courses for rescuers, advanced courses, professional courses and courses for the general public. A rigorous training program is mandatory for all rescue workers near heavily populated areas and most active teams in rescue operations. The training is composed of weekend-long field experience training once per month, and instructional courses once per week, amounting to an estimated 430 hours spread over a period of two years. Because of the role of rescue teams in civil defence, the school has received some support from Iceland Catastrophe Insurance. Gufuskálar Training Camp on the Snæfellsnes Peninsula. Here, the association runs a training camp for all rescue work participants.

=== Maritime safety ===
Maritime Safety and Survival Training Centre (MSSTC) is owned by ICE-SAR and was founded in 1985. A wide variety of different courses are provided by the centre which aims on maritime safety. In 1998, the government of Iceland ICE-SAR the ferry Akraborg to replace the old training vessel. She was renamed Sæbjörg and converted into training vessel.

Most of the training centre students come from the fishing fleet. There are no international requirements for safety training for fishermen, but national law requires fishermen to participate in a safety course before they go out to sea for the first time. Icelandic merchantmen participate in the MSSTC courses though their vessels are not flying the flag of Iceland.

On board the training vessel Sæbjörg there are well equipped classrooms and space for practical exercise. Average number of students on courses is 25, but on special courses the number is lower. Among the course subject is first aid, sea survival, firefighting and personal safety. The Icelandic Coast Guard helicopters play a role on every basic course as the seafarers are trained in methods used with rescue by helicopters as well as they are winched into the helicopter from ship, life raft and from water.

== See also ==
- Ingibjörg rescue boat
- Search and rescue
