= Oban Lifeboat Station =

RNLI Lifeboat station in Argyll and Bute, Scotland

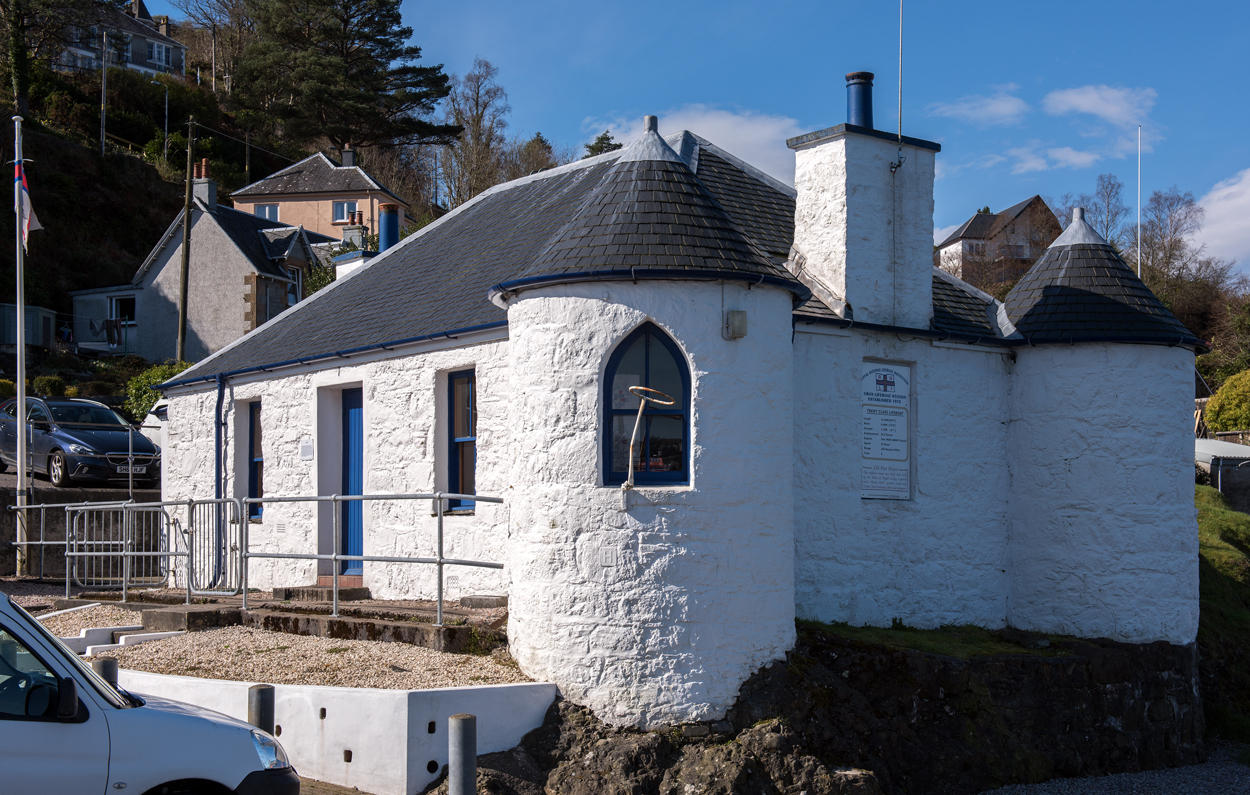
- Oban Lifeboat Station

- Location within Argyll and Bute

General information
- Type: RNLI Lifeboat Station
- Location: South Pier House, Gallanach Road, Oban, Argyll and Bute, PA34 4LS, Scotland
- Coordinates: 56°24′39.7″N 5°28′46.5″W
- Opened: 22 May 1972
- Owner: Royal National Lifeboat Institution

Website
- Oban RNLI Lifeboat Station

Oban Lifeboat Station is located at South Pier House on Gallanach Road in Oban, a harbour town approximately 61 miles (98 km) north-west of Glasgow, overlooking the Firth of Lorn, in the county of Argyll and Bute, Scotland.

A lifeboat was first stationed at Oban by the Royal National Lifeboat Institution (RNLI) on 22 May 1972.

Shannon-class All-weather lifeboat 13-50 The Campbell Watson (ON 1357)

The station currently operates 13-50 The Campbell Watson (ON 1357), a Shannon-class All-weather lifeboat, on station since 2024.

== History ==
With a general increase in leisure boating activity, and with the nearest lifeboat stations at Islay and Mallaig being over 50 miles (80 km) away, following a coastal review in 1971, the RNLI decided to place one of their larger Inshore lifeboats at Oban.

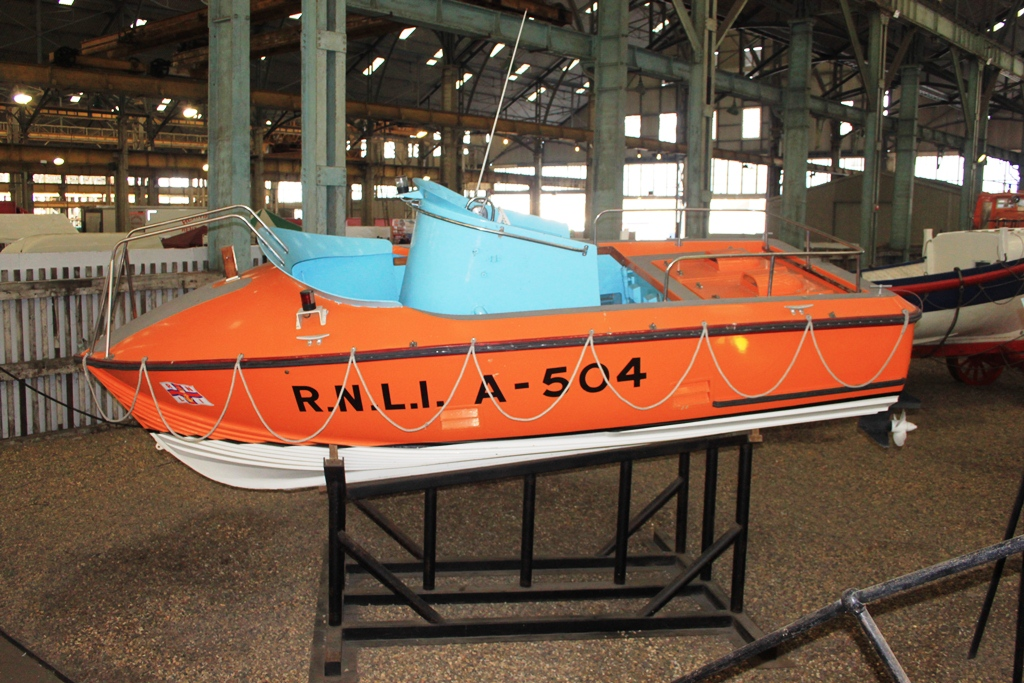
McLachlan-class lifeboat A-504, preserved in the RNLI Heritage Collection at Chatham Historic Dockyard

The 18 ft (5.5 m) A-class (McLachlan) Inshore lifeboat A-505 (previously given the All-weather designation 18-005) arrived at Oban on 5 May 1972. The boat was kept at a mooring off the wooden pier, and a small 8 ft (2.4 m) inflatable dinghy was donated by local architect and hotelier Bill Crerar, to be used as the boarding boat. A tin-roofed shed on the South Pier leased from the local council would become the 'lifeboat station', as a place to store all essential equipment.

The first call for the lifeboat was just 19 days later on 24 May 1972, when three children, who had set out in their parents' sailing dinghy, found themselves unable to return in the strong winds, and were rescued as their boat headed towards the rocks of Creag Island.

A new A-class (McLachlan) lifeboat (A-511) was sent to the station in 1973. A contribution of £5,000 towards the cost of the boat was received from the North British Hotel Trust. The North British Hotel Trust was set up in 1902, with half the shareholding placed in trust, to ensure that a percentage of the profits were distributed to charitable organisations.

A service on 24 June 1974 resulted in the lifeboat towing a 16-ton vessel. Another call to two fishing boats, aground at Ardmore Point on Mull, took over two hours to reach the vessels. By 1976, it was clear that the Inshore lifeboat was being pushed to her operational limits, and sometimes beyond. In August 1978, Oban became an All-weather lifeboat station, with the arrival of a 42-foot Watson-class lifeboat, the Watkin Williams (ON 922). The boat was already 22-years-old at that time, but had served well at Moelfre, and been involved in at least two RNLI Gold Medal rescues under the command of Richard Evans BEM. The Inshore boat would remain on service.

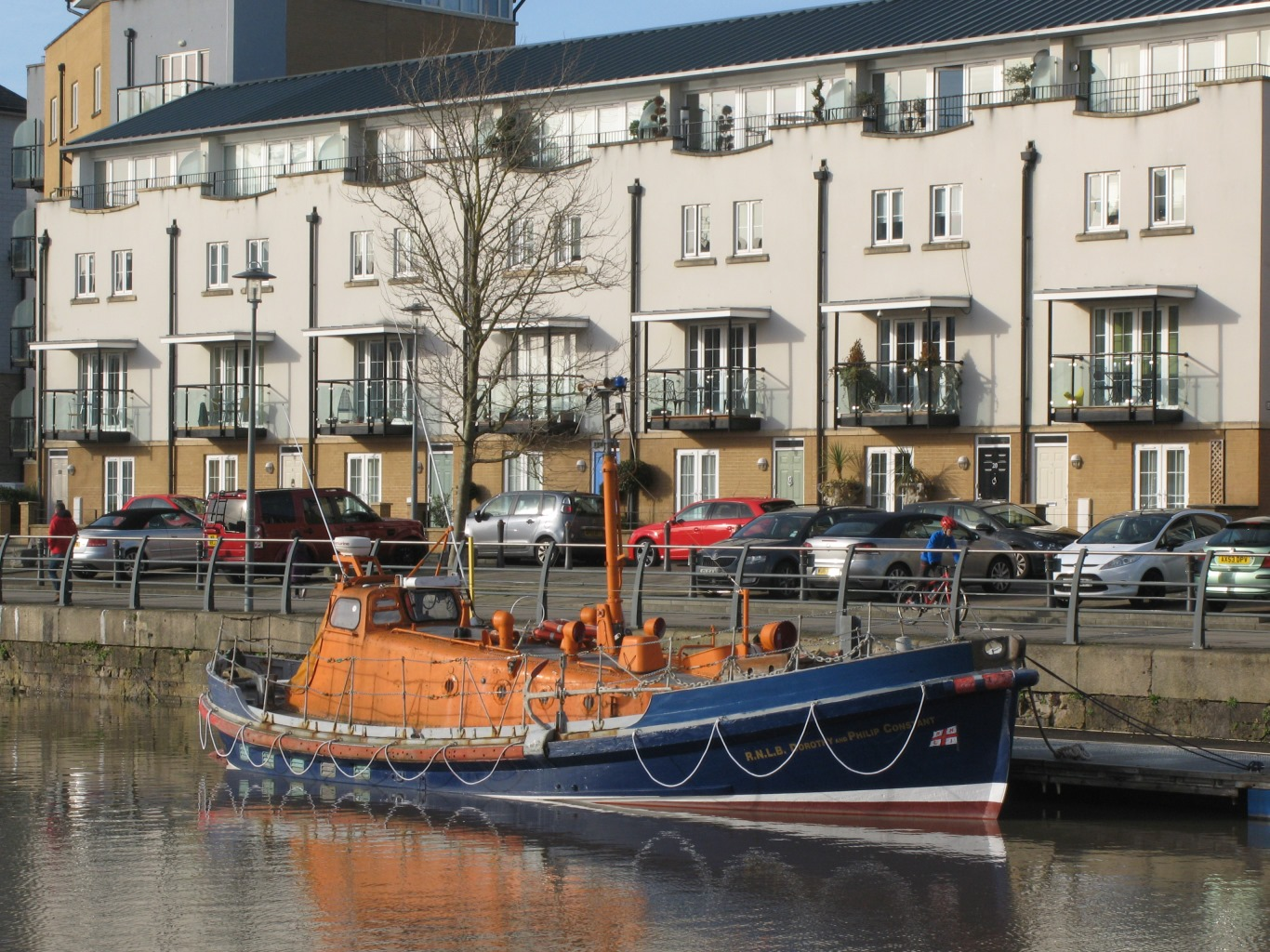
42ft Watson-class lifeboat Dorothy and Philip Constant (ON 967)

Watkin Williams served Oban for three years, before being transferred to the relief fleet in 1981, and sold out of service in 1983. She was replaced for just one year by the Dorothy and Philip Constant (ON 967), another 42ft Watson-class heading for retirement, but this boat had the advantage of being equipped with radar. However, delivering a top speed of just 8.25 knots (15.28 km/h; 9.49 mph), speed was still an issue.

In 1982, the Inshore lifeboat was withdrawn, and the Offshore lifeboat was replaced. Oban was the first station to get a new class of lifeboat to replace the Dorothy and Philip Constant. The Brede-class was a 33 ft (10 m) intermediate size lifeboat, with a crew of four, designed to meet operational requirements between the rigid inflatable Atlantic 21 class, and the larger lifeboats. Built by Lochin Marine of Rye Harbour, it had a GRP (Glass Reinforced Polymer) hull, and her twin Caterpillar '3208NA' diesel engines would deliver a top speed of 19 knots (35 km/h; 22 mph).

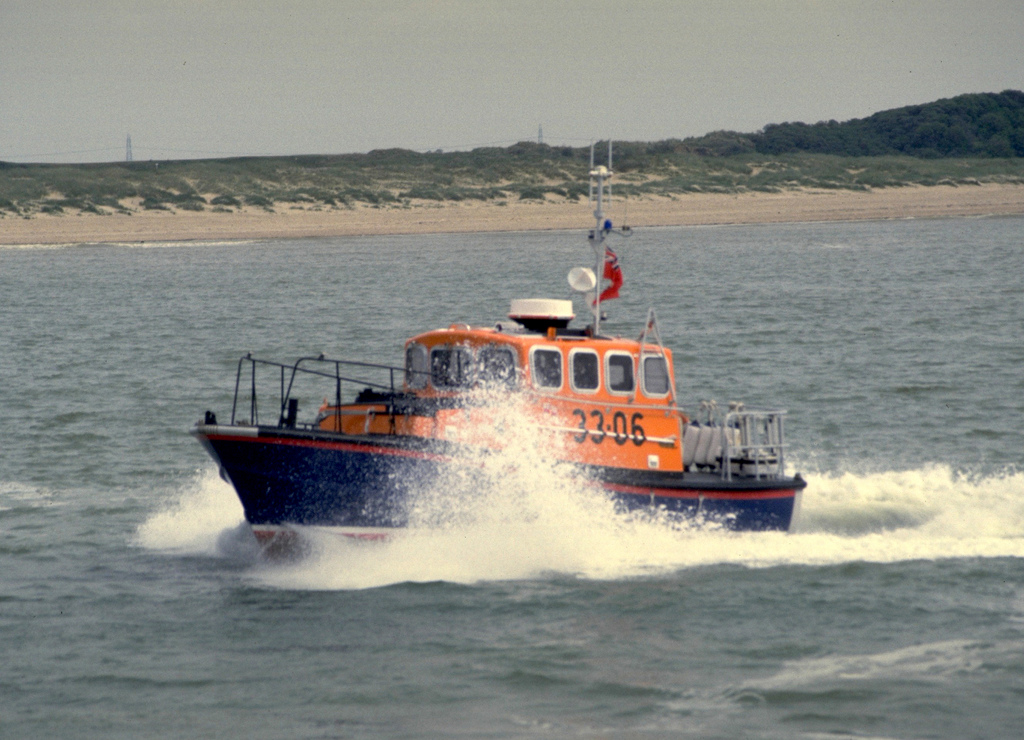
Brede-class lifeboat 33-06 Caroline Finch (ON 1088) at Exmouth

Keen seafarers James and Ann Ritchie, of the Isle of Man brewing company Heron and Brearley, funded a lifeboat for Ramsey, the James Ball Ritchie (ON 995), which arrived on service in 1970, shortly after James' death. Ann Ritchie, née Gough, President of the Ramsey Ladies Lifeboat Guild, decided to fund two more lifeboats: one for Port St Mary, 54-06 Gough Ritchie (ON 1051), and one for Oban.

The new Oban lifeboat was named 33-02 Ann Ritchie (ON 1080). Ann formally named the boat at a ceremony on 7 May 1983, and after a short trip on the boat, she was presented with a painting and a Caithness Glass bowl. These were returned to the station on her instruction, following her death in 1990.

The residue of Ann Ritchie's estate became the Gough Ritchie Charitable Trust. One third of its income is distributed to the RNLI for use on the Isle of Man, and has so far funded two more lifeboats.

At 03:32 on 31 January 1985, the Oban lifeboat Ann Ritchie was called to the aid of the 80-ton fishing vessel Shemara, aground on Lady's Rock, to the south west of Lismore Island. In poor conditions and shallow water, and in the dark, the eight crew were rescued after 14 attempts. Awards were made to the coxswain and crew.

=== 1990s onwards ===
Trent-class lifeboat 14-23 Mara Edith Macdonald (ON 1227)

On 16 July 1997, Oban received the 14.30 m (46 ft 11 in) Trent-class lifeboat 14-23 Mara Edith Macdonald (ON 1227). This was a much larger, and much more powerful lifeboat, her twin MAN diesel engines giving a top speed of 25 knots (29 mph; 46 km/h). The Trent-class lifeboat served Oban for more than half of the time the station has existed. In some years, over 100 callouts were made.

In 2005, Mara Edith Macdonald was launched to the aid of the yacht Classic Wave which had lost power, with three people aboard. When the lifeboat arrived, the boat was aground on a shelf, and taking in water. Third mechanic Peter MacKinnon was sent aboard with a pump, but it had little effect, and it was decided to abandon the vessel. During this process, the boat suddenly slipped off the shelf and sank, a rope dragging MacKinnon under the water, but he managed to resurface, and all four men were rescued.

Three men and a woman were rescued from an upturned dinghy on 16 July 2023, off the Isle of Lismore. Spotted by a passing yacht, none were wearing life-jackets, and they had been unable to call for help as they had no radio, and their phones were submerged.

After 27 years on station, Mara Edith Macdonald was withdrawn to the relief fleet. Oban received a £2.2 million Shannon-class lifeboat on 4 March 2024, the same day as the 200th anniversary of the RNLI. The boat was two-thirds funded from the legacy of Mrs Elizabeth Watson, née Campbell, who died aged 90 in May 2021. Two other legacies also helped fund the boat.

== Station honours ==
The following are awards made at Oban:

- 'The Thanks of the Institution inscribed on Vellum'
  John Patrick Maclean, Coxswain/Mechanic – 1985
- Vellum Service Certificates
  William E. Forteith – 1985
  David M. Graham – 1985
  Michael J. Robertson – 1985
- Gold Medal, awarded by Silk Cut Nautical Awards (Bravery Category)
  John Patrick Maclean, Coxswain/Mechanic – 1985
  William E. Forteith – 1985
  David M. Graham – 1985
  Michael J. Robertson – 1985
- 'A Framed Letter of Thanks signed by the Chairman of the Institution'
  Peter MacKinnon, Third Mechanic – 2005
- Member, Order of the British Empire (MBE)
  John Patrick Maclean, Coxswain/Mechanic – 1997QBH
  Norman Macleod, Honorary Secretary – 2002QBH

== Oban lifeboats ==
=== Inshore lifeboats ===
Op.No. (Note: Op.No. is the RNLI's Operational Number of the boat carried on the hull.)	Name	On station	Class	Comments
A-505	Unnamed	1972–1973	A-class (McLachlan)	Formerly ON 18-005
A-511	Unnamed	1973–1982	A-class (McLachlan)	

=== All-weather lifeboats ===
ON (Note: ON is the RNLI's Official Number of the boat.)	Op.No.	Name	Built	On station	Class	Comments
922	–	Watkin Williams	1956	1978–1981	42-foot Watson	Previously at Moelfre. Transferred to the Relief fleet.
967	–	Dorothy and Philip Constant	1962	1981–1982	42-foot Watson	Previously at Shoreham Harbour. Transferred to the Relief fleet.
1080	33-02	Ann Ritchie	1982	1982–1987	Brede	
1087	33-05	Merchant Navy	1983	1987–1989	Brede	Previously deployed in the Relief fleet.
1102	33-10	Nottinghamshire	1984	1989–1997	Brede	Previously at Invergordon.
1227	14-23	Mara Edith Macdonald	1997	1997–2024	Trent	
1357	13-50	The Campbell Watson	2023	2024–	Shannon	

More post-service details can be found on the respective lifeboat class pages.

== See also ==
- List of RNLI stations
- List of former RNLI stations
- Royal National Lifeboat Institution lifeboats
