= Packard X-2775 =

Experimental aircraft engine

Packard 1A-2775
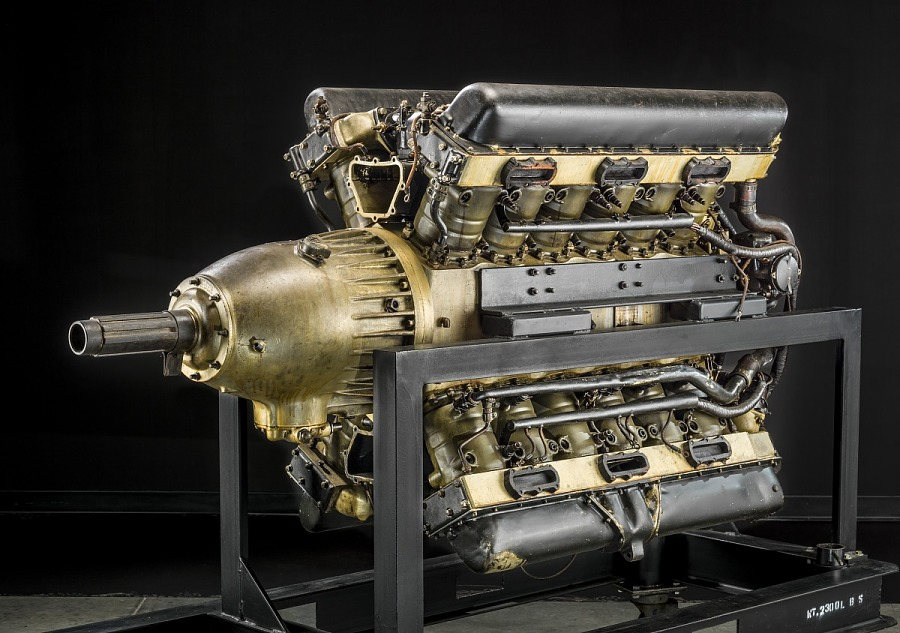
- Packard 1A-2775 at the National Air and Space Museum
- Type: 24-cylinder liquid-cooled X-configured piston engine
- National origin: United States
- Manufacturer: Packard Motor Car Company
- First run: 1927
- Manufactured: 1927–1935
- Number built: 3
- Developed from: Packard 1A-1500

The Packard X-2775 (company designation 1A-2775) was an American experimental liquid-cooled aircraft engine. The engine was constructed as a single crankcase with four banks of six cylinders in what is close to an X-configuration. The engine consisted of two 60° V12 engines, one upright and one inverted, sharing a common crankcase. Although technically incorrect, the engine has been characterized as two Packard 1A-1500 V12 engines coupled with a mutual crankcase.

== Design and development ==
In 1926, about 20 New York businessmen, including James Packard, and a group of US Navy officers expressed an interest in building an airplane designed to break the standing air speed record. Navy officials agreed to finance the project, when funds became available. The aircraft was to be completed in time to participate in the 1927 Schneider Trophy Race, which would be held in Italy.

=== 1A-2775 engine ===
The engine was designed by Captain Lionel Nelson, USN, an aeronautical engineer at Packard. It was an "X" configuration, similar to one upright and one inverted V12 engine mounted on the same crankshaft with a common crankcase. With a bore of 5.375 in (136.5 mm) and stroke of 5 in (130 mm) stroke, the resulting displacement was 2,775 cu in (45.47 L). The engineering involved in the design of the crankshaft, single piece crankcase, and connecting rod system was very complex.

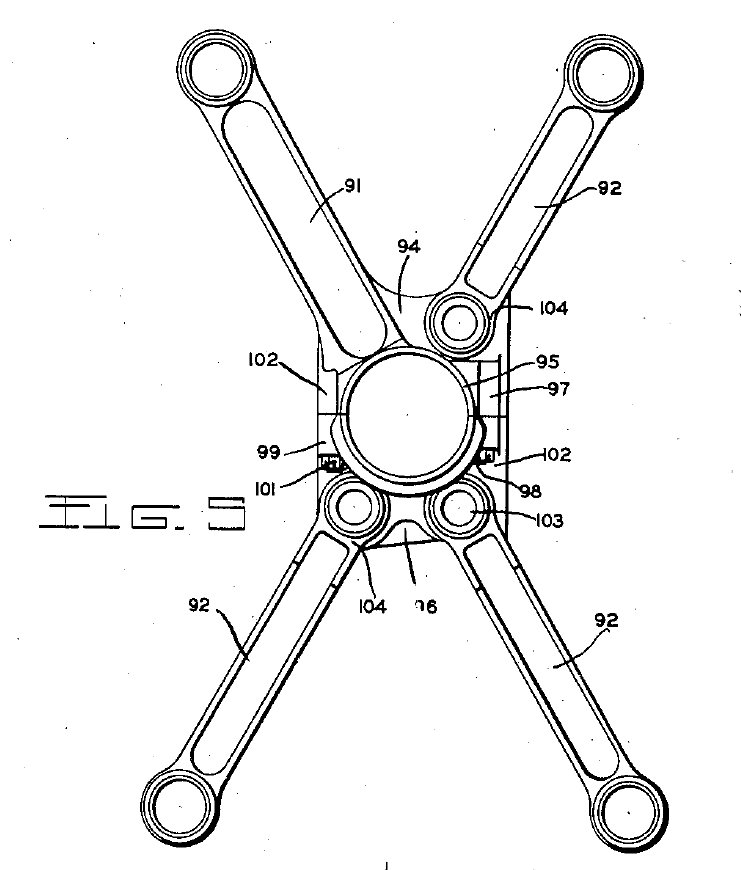
Master/slave connecting rod arrangement

The connecting rods were of a master-and-slave design similar to that used on a radial engine. In any engine using master-and-slave rods, all cylinders not located at 180° from the cylinder using the master rod will have slightly longer stroke lengths than the cylinders with the master rods. Here, the 5 in (130 mm) stroke became a slightly longer 5.125 in (130.2 mm) in two of four banks, and resulted in slightly more displacement than the nominal 2,722.88 cu in (44.6200 L) of an engine of that bore and stroke. The engine produced 1,250 hp (930 kW) at 2,700 rpm and weighed 1,402 lb (636 kg).

The crank cheeks were used as main bearing journals, and were 7.75 in (197 mm) in diameter. This was necessary to keep the crankshaft length the same as the 1A-1500 engine so its components could be used, and to keep the weight as low as possible. The single piece crankcase was designed to save weight and give maximum strength, but made assembly of the engine difficult. The engine was finished by August 1927.

The Navy's Bureau of Aeronautics ordered a second, supercharged engine under their original contract No. 3224. It was equipped with a special Roots-type supercharger. It was ordered with a supercharger when it was discovered that it would be necessary to supercharge the engine in order to equal the reported speeds of the other contestants.

The Bureau of Aeronautics analyzed the possibilities of the plane becoming a competitive race plane, and decided that the extra weight of the supercharger could be better put to use by installing an epicyclic reduction gear, for improved propeller efficiency, thereby providing greater improvement in performance than what the supercharged engine with a direct drive propeller could provide for the same weight.

It was further planned to increase the compression ratio of the engine, improving its performance with no increase in weight, but needed to secure dynamometer data on the supercharged engine to make a final decision. The dynamometer tests indicated the power output was only 1,300 hp (970 kW) @ 2,800 rpm due to the large impeller clearance that allowed only 7.7 in (200 mm) Hg (3.8 psi) boost. After reducing the impeller clearances, the supercharger then produced 9.6 in (240 mm) Hg (4.7 psi) of boost and the engine delivered 1,500 hp (1,100 kW) at 2,700 rpm.

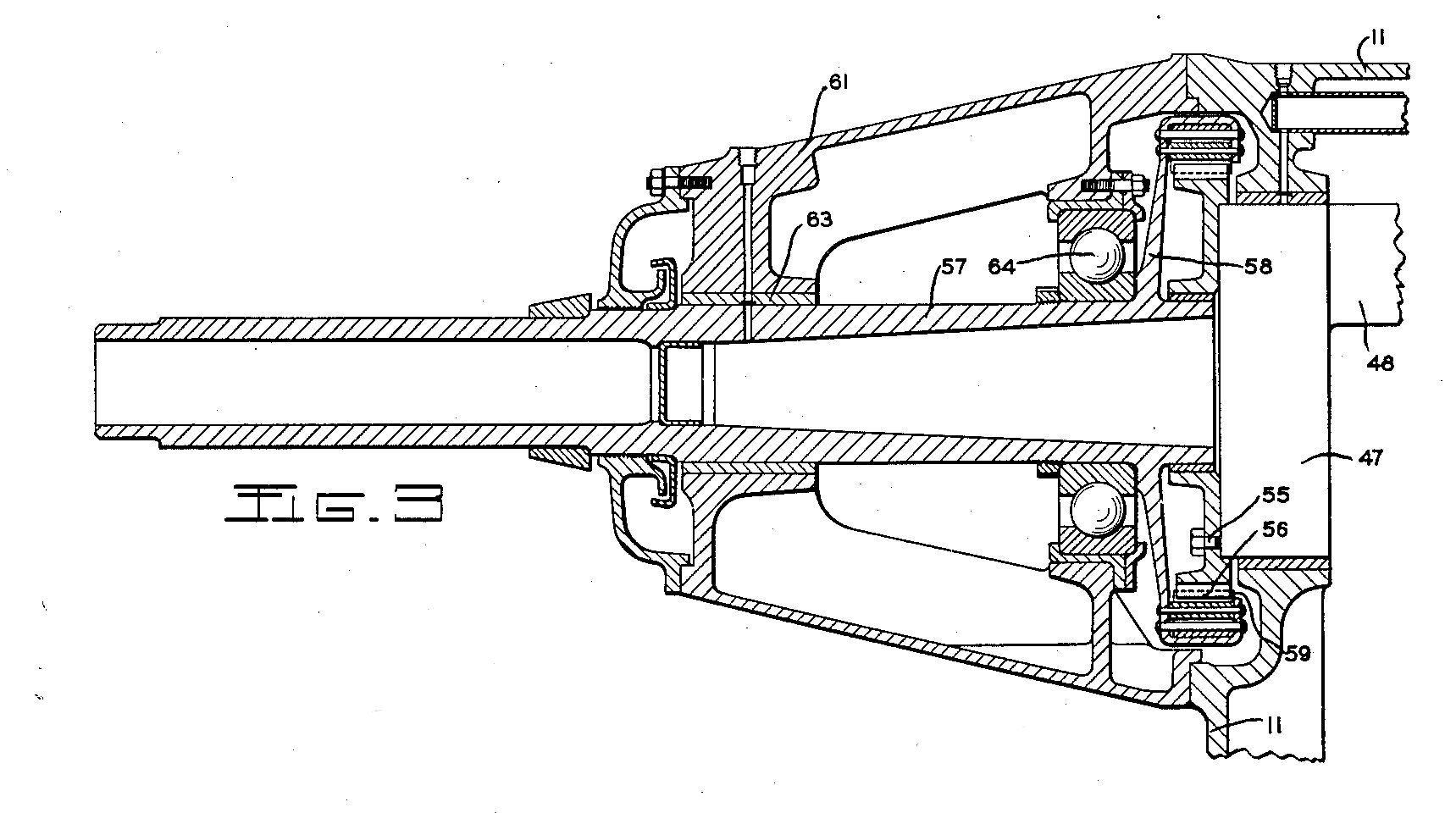
Engine nose cone and reduction gearing

The first engine later received an epicyclic propeller reduction gear made by Allison, an increase in its compression ratio, a Scintilla magneto ignition, and the new design cylinder banks of the 3A-1500 inverted engines, a design that had both spark plugs on the outside for easier maintenance.

Official Packard photographs of this engine are marked "model 2A-2775", and photographs of the earlier versions are marked "not to be released to the press — hereafter only 2A-2775 are to be released — per Capt. Woolson." Most of the published photographs are of this engine. In spite of Captain Woolson's note, it was identified as either a 1A-2775 or the "Packard X engine."

The engine was advertised as being available "built-to-order" as late as September 1930 at $35,000 each. No orders were received, and because only two engines were built, both for the Navy as X-2775s, the Packard model designation of 2A-2775 never came into public use.

Engine No. 2 also received the new style cylinder banks and was tested both with and without the reduction gear. The direct drive and reduction gear units were interchangeable, and were switched between the two engines as needed.

Engine No. 1 in its most modified version, with high compression, reduction gear and late type cylinder banks, was used in the Naval Aircraft Factory Mercury racing plane with engine 1A-2775, Serial No. 1, Bureau No.10960, as a U.S. entry in the 1929 Schneider Trophy.

Engine No. 1 is the only known 1A-2775 survivor and it was given by the Navy to the Smithsonian in 1971. It is in the same configuration as it was when used in the Mercury racer.

=== 2A-2775 engine ===
Packard apparently built a third engine some time after 1931 when the Navy had stopped testing its engines. No photographs of this engine have been found, but engineering data dated in early 1939 show a 2A-2775 with an output of 1,900 hp (1,400 kW) @ 2,800 rpm. BMEP was listed as 196 psi (1,350 kPa) indicating the engine was supercharged.

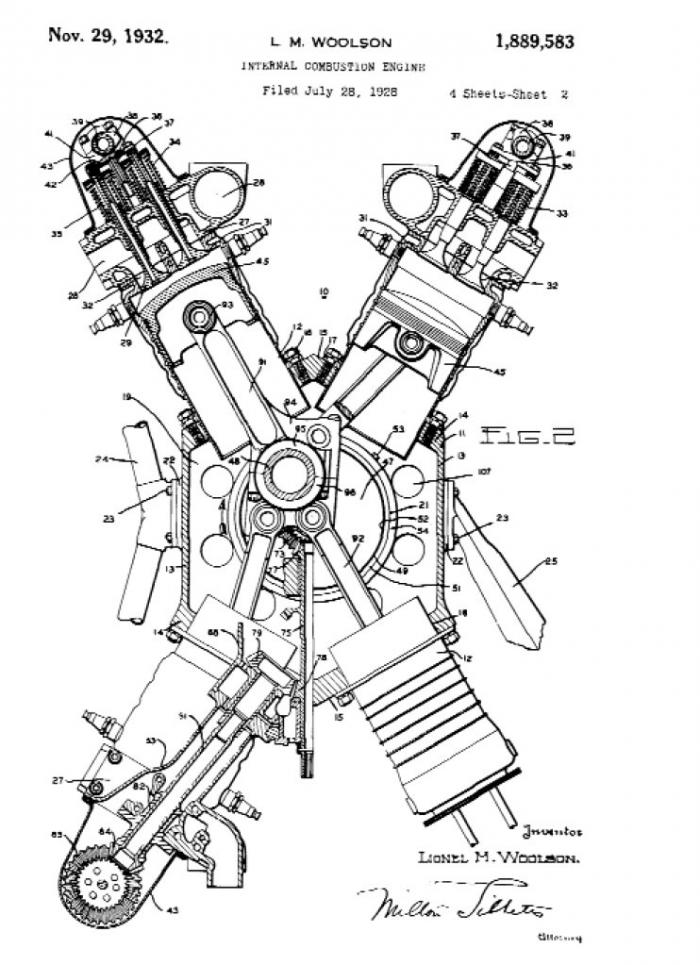
The Packard X-2775 engine fitted to the Kirkham-Williams X racer

== Variants ==
1A-2775 No.1
rated at 1,200 hp (890 kW) at 2600 rpm and max of 1,250 hp (930 kW)at 2700 rpm, - Weight 1,513 lb (686 kg).
1A-2775 No.2
rated at 1,400 hp (1,000 kW) at 2600 rpm and max of 1,500 hp (1,100 kW) at 2700 rpm, - Weight: 1,635 lb (742 kg) - Supercharged (1928)
2A-2775 No.3
rated at 1,900 hp (1,400 kW) at 2800 rpm, - Weight: 1,722 lb (781 kg).- Supercharged (1935)

== Applications ==
- Kirkham-Williams X
- Naval Aircraft Factory SP (aka Mercury Racer)

== Survivors ==
The No.1 engine survives in the Smithsonian Museum collection.

== Specifications (1A-2775 no.2) ==
Data from STATISTICS OF ALL THE AERO ENGINES OF PACKARD

=== General characteristics ===
- Type: 24-cylinder, liquid-cooled, X-configured, piston engine
- Bore: 5.375 in (136.5 mm)
- Stroke: 5 in (127.0 mm) nominal (2 banks 5.125 in (130.2 mm) due to master/slave connecting rods)
- Displacement: 2,774 cu in (45.46 L)
- Dry weight: 1,635 lb (742 kg).

=== Components ===
- Valvetrain: 4-valve, overhead-cam
- Supercharger: Gear-driven supercharger

=== Performance ===
- Power output: 1,400 hp (1,000 kW) at 2600 rpm maximum continuous; 1,500 hp (1,100 kW) at 2700 rpm maximum
- Specific power: 0.55 hp/cu in (25 kW/L)
- Power-to-weight ratio: 0.92 hp/lb (1.51 kW/kg)
