= Sheerness Lifeboat Station =

RNLI Lifeboat Station in Kent, England

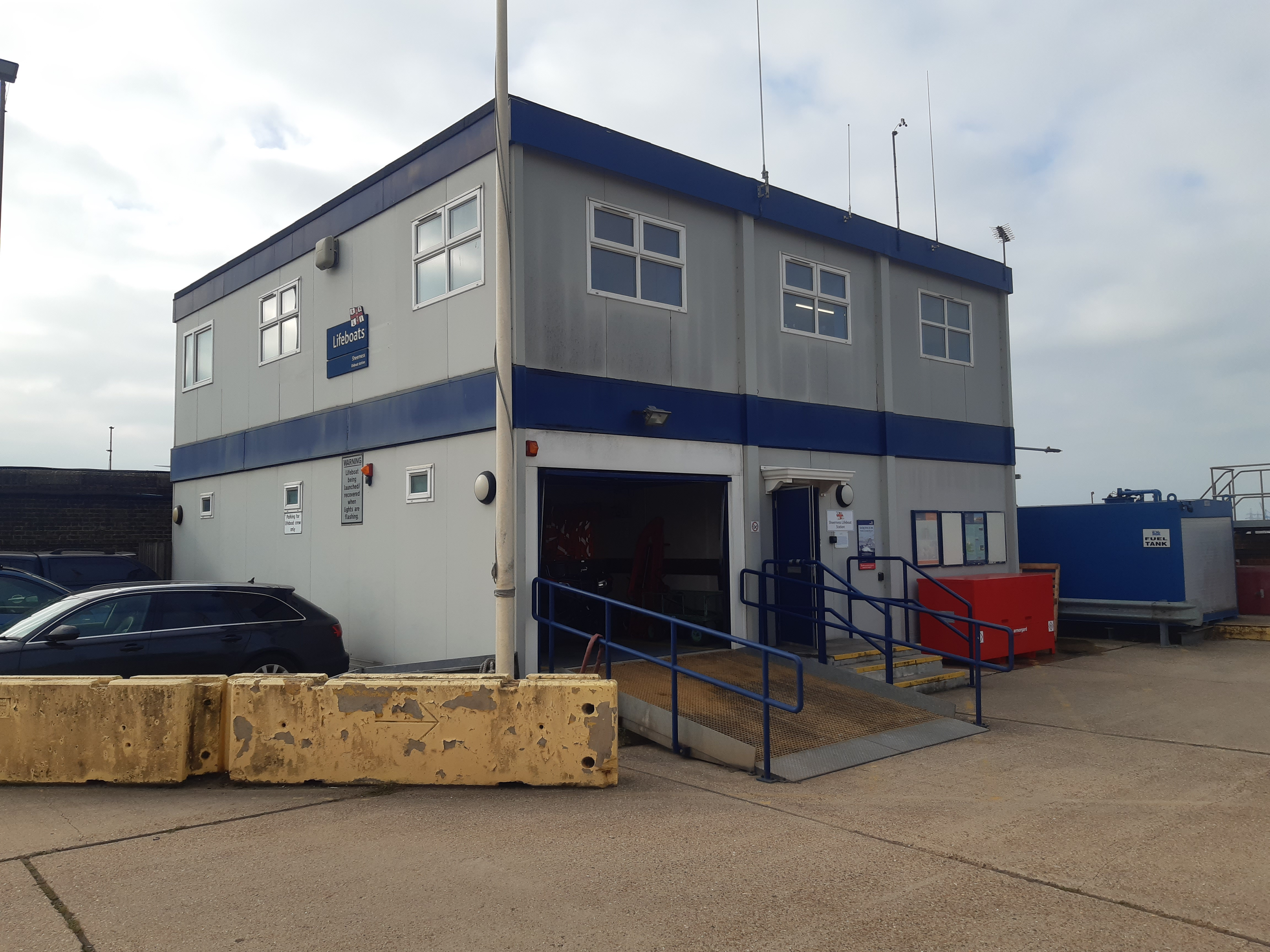
- Sheerness Lifeboat Station, Garrison Point.

- Location within Kent

General information
- Type: RNLI Lifeboat Station
- Location: Sheerness Lifeboat Station, Garrison Point, Sheerness Dockyard, Sheerness, Kent, ME12 1RS, England
- Coordinates: 51°26′44.3″N 0°44′40.5″E
- Opened: 1970
- Inaugurated: 1969
- Owner: Royal National Lifeboat Institution

Sheerness Lifeboat Station is strategically located at Garrison Point in Sheerness Dockyard, in Sheerness, a town on the Isle of Sheppey, sitting at the mouth of the River Medway, and overlooking the Thames estuary, on the north coast of the county of Kent.

A lifeboat station was first established at Sheerness in 1969, by the Royal National Lifeboat Institution (RNLI).

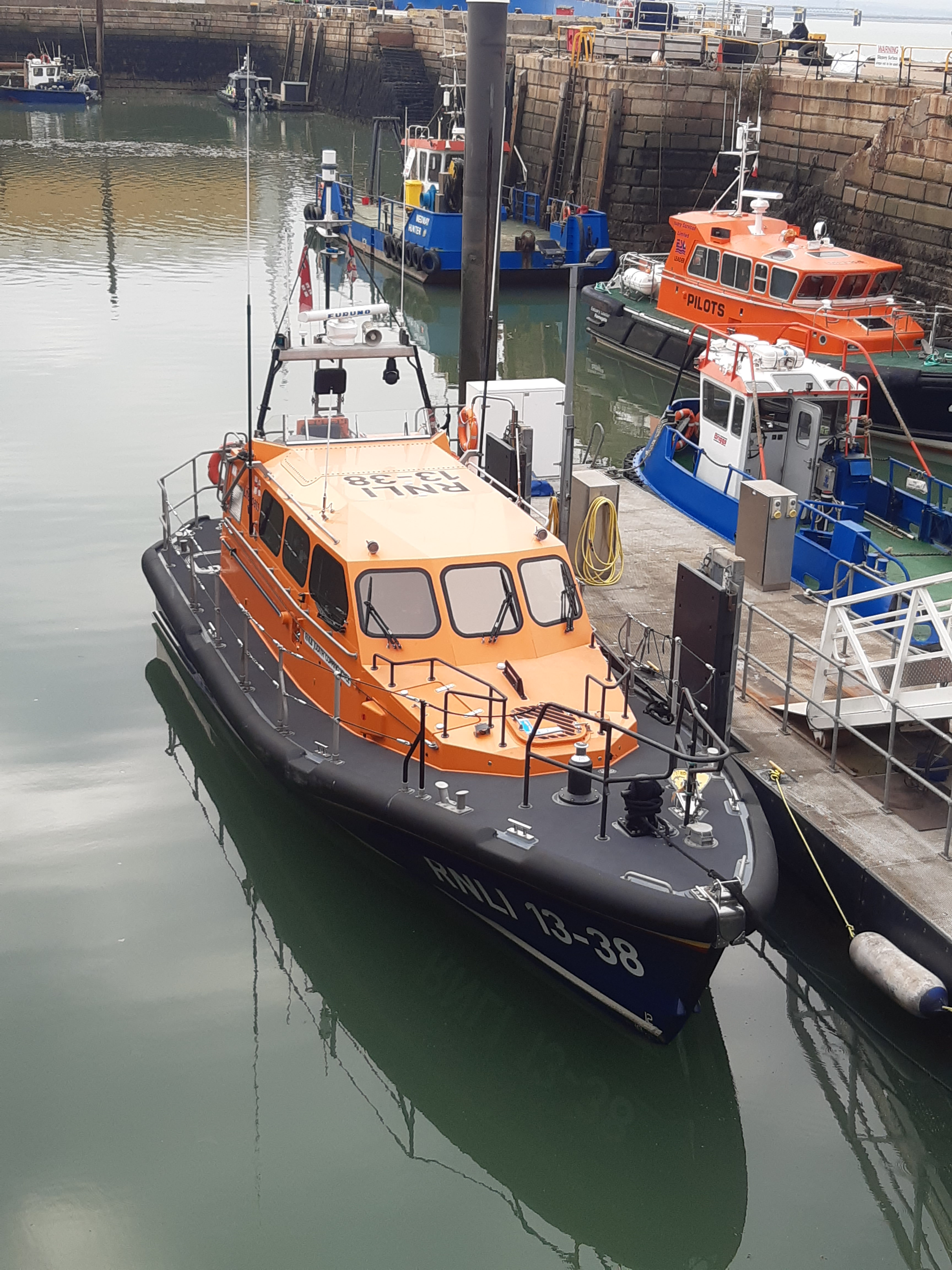
Shannon-class 13-38 Judith Copping Joyce (ON 1345)

The station currently operates 13-38 Judith Copping Joyce (ON 1345), a Shannon-class All-weather lifeboat, on station since 2021, and a small D-class (IB1) Inshore lifeboat, Buster (D-799), on station since 2016.

== History ==
In 1969, the RNLI placed two extra lifeboats on the Thames Estuary, following a decision by the RAF to withdraw the rescue helicopters from RAF Manston. An extra D-class lifeboat went to Southend-on-Sea, and it was decided to place an All-weather lifeboat at Sheerness on evaluation.

The first lifeboat was a new design, a 41-foot lifeboat, moulded in GRP, and fitted out by Keith Nelson Ltd, of Bembridge, with twin diesel engines, producing 19kts. Subsequently called a Keith Nelson class lifeboat, she was the only one constructed. Numbered 40-001, she was named Ernest William and Elizabeth Ellen Hinde (ON 1017) after a legacy from Mrs. Hinde.

Ernest William and Elizabeth Ellen Hinde (ON 1017) was on station from April to November 1969, but with a two month period away for repairs in July and August. For that time, Sheerness had a relief boat on station, a Waveney-class lifeboat 44-001. In late 1969, the Keith Nelson boat was transferred to Calshot for further evaluation, and Sheerness then received a 46ft Watson-class lifeboat, Canadian Pacific (ON 803), a boat already over 30 years old, and capable of just 8.5kts.

In January 1970, following a successful appraisal, the RNLI decided to establish a permanent station at Sheerness. Canadian Pacific was replaced by another 46ft Watson-class lifeboat in April 1970, Gertrude (ON 847), already a 25 year old lifeboat, that had previously been stationed at Holy Island and Exmouth. Despite her age, she would be launched 103 times, and save 61 lives, over her 4 year term on station.

The station received another Waveney-class lifeboat in 1974, but this time, the brand new 44-009 Helen Turnbull (ON 1027), which served the station for the next 22 years.

During her time on service, the Helen Turnbull would be launched four times, when medals for gallantry were later awarded. Coxswain Charles Henry Bowry was twice awarded the RNLI Bronze Medal, for services in 1976 and 1979. On 19 March 1980, the Helen Turnbull (ON 1027) was launched at 18:16 into a strong gale, to the aid of the offshore radio station ship Mi Amigo, which had dragged her anchor, and been driven ashore on Long Sand Shoal. In poor conditions, the lifeboat stood by for three hours, until the ship refloated, but it pitched and rolled badly. Four survivors were taken off after 13 attempts by the lifeboat, the vessel sinking a short time later. Coxswain Charles Henry Bowry was awarded the RNLI Silver Medal. A fourth medal (bronze), was awarded to Coxswain Robin Castle, for a service in the 1987 Hurricane, where the lives of two fishermen were saved.

In 1985, negotiations took place with the Medway Ports Authority, and the lifeboat was relocated to Gun Wharf Steps. New crew facilities were provided in 2000, and a new Pontoon berth was constructed in 2010.

Trent-class lifeboat 14-13 George and Ivy Swanson (ON 1211), which had been placed on station in 1996, and served Sheerness for 25 years, was replaced in 2021, with the arrival of a new Shannon-class lifeboat 13-38 Judith Copping Joyce (ON 1345).

== Station honours ==
The following are awards made at Sheerness

- RNLI Silver Medal
  Charles Henry Bowry, Coxswain/Mechanic – 1980
- RNLI Bronze Medal
  Charles Henry Bowry, Coxswain/Mechanic – 1976
  Charles Henry Bowry, Coxswain/Mechanic – 1979 (Second-Service clasp)
  Robin William Castle, Coxswain/Mechanic – 1987
- The Thanks of the Institution inscribed on Vellum
  Malcolm E. Keen, crew member – 1974
  The lifeboat crew – 1980
  Richard Rogers, Helm – 1987
  Brian Spoor, crew member – 1987
  Dennis Bailey Jr., Second Coxswain – 1987
  Richard Rogers, crew member – 1987
- Member, Order of the British Empire (MBE)
  Robin William Castle, Coxswain – 2010NYH
- Freedom of the Borough of Swale
  Robin Castle, Former Coxswain – 2021

== Sheerness lifeboats ==
=== All-weather lifeboats ===
ON (Note: ON is the RNLI's Official Number of the boat.)	Op. No. (Note: Op. No. is the RNLI's Operational Number of the boat carried on the hull.)	Name	On station	Class	Comments
1017	40-001	Ernest William and Elizabeth Ellen Hinde	1969	Keith Nelson	Boat placed at Sheerness for evaluation prior to establishment of station
803	–	Canadian Pacific	1969–1970	46-foot Watson	
847	–	Gertrude	1970–1974	46-foot Watson	
1027	44-009	Helen Turnbull	1974–1996	Waveney	
1211	14-13	George and Ivy Swanson	1996–2021	Trent	
1345	13-38	Judith Copping Joyce	2021–	Shannon	Delivered 28 May 2021

=== Inshore lifeboats ===
Op. No.	Name	On station	Class	Comments
D-145	Unnamed	1972–1976	D-class (RFD PB16)	
D-50	Unnamed	1973–1974	D-class (RFD PB16)	
D-253	Unnamed	1976–1988	D-class (Zodiac III)	
D-362	Kensington Rescuer	1988–1996	D-class (EA16)	
D-513	Seahorse I	1996–2006	D-class (EA16)	
D-662	Eleanor	2006–2016	D-class (IB1)	
D-799	Buster	2016–	D-class (IB1)	

== See also ==
- List of RNLI stations
- List of former RNLI stations
- Royal National Lifeboat Institution lifeboats
