= Invergordon Lifeboat Station =

RNLI lifeboat station in Highland, Scotland

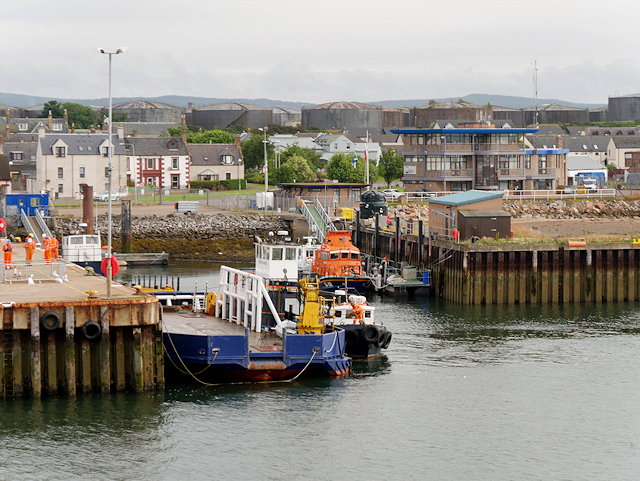
- Invergordon Lifeboat Station

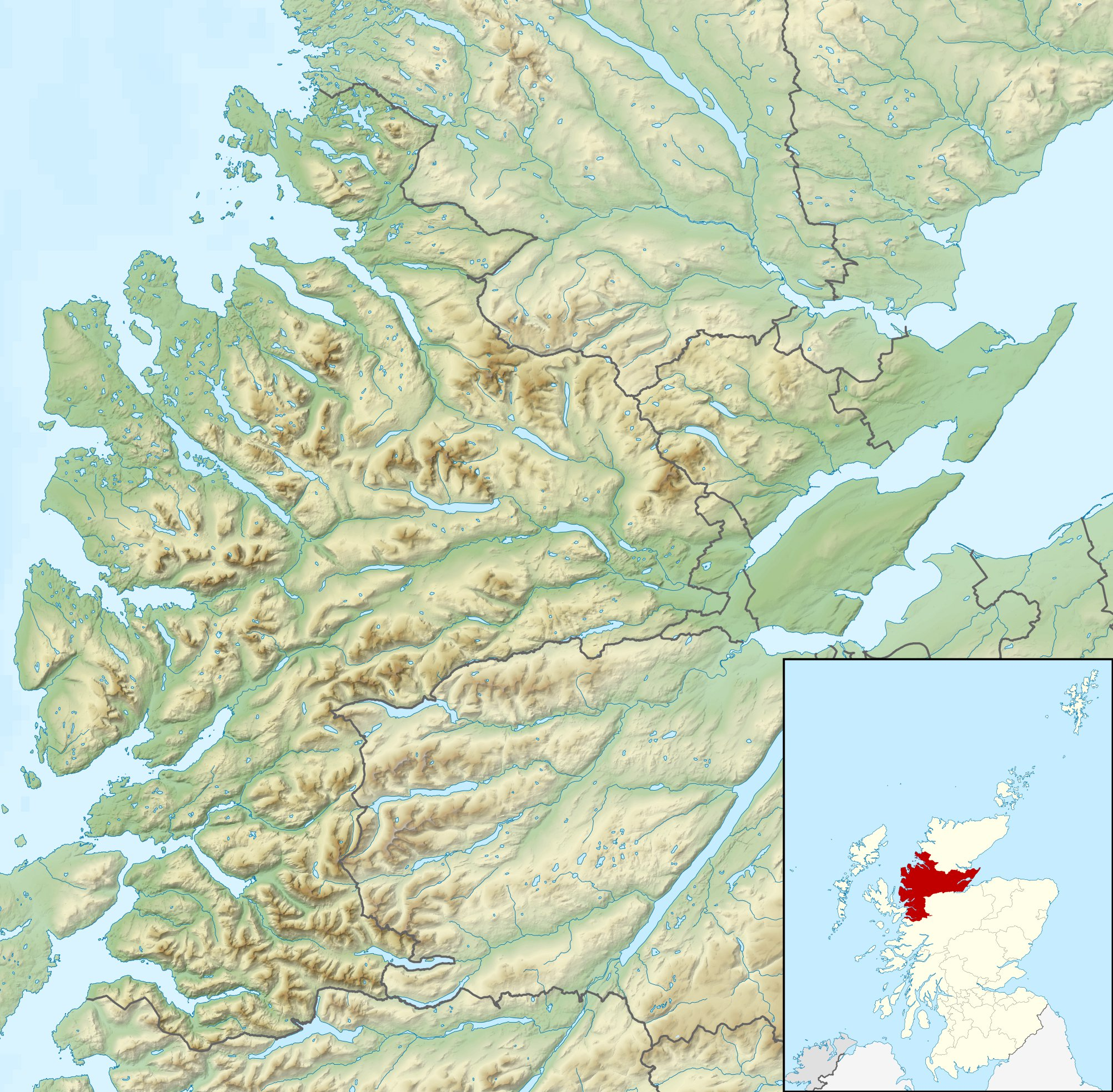
- Location within Ross and Cromarty

General information
- Type: RNLI Lifeboat Station
- Location: Shore Road, Invergordon, Highland, IV18 0EX, Scotland
- Coordinates: 57°41′11.6″N 4°10′02.6″W
- Opened: 1974
- Owner: Royal National Lifeboat Institution

Website
- Invergordon RNLI Lifeboat Station

Invergordon Lifeboat Station is located on Shore Road, in Invergordon, Easter Ross, a port town situated on the Cromarty Firth, approximately 5 miles (8.0 km) from the open water of the North Sea, formerly in Ross and Cromarty, now in the administrative region of Highland.

A lifeboat was first stationed at Invergordon by the Royal National Lifeboat Institution (RNLI) in 1974.

The station currently operates 13-37 Agnes A. P. Barr (ON 1344), a Shannon-class All-weather lifeboat, on station since 2021.

== History ==
The lifeboat station located at Cromarty, at the mouth of the Cromarty Firth, had been closed in 1968, due to crew shortages, and a decline in the local fishing industry. Only five years later, with an increased amount of sea traffic due to the Oil industry, the RNLI decided that it should re-establish a station in the area, where a crew could be maintained.

At a public meeting at Invergordon Town Hall on 9 November 1973, Commander Peter Gladwin and Divisional Inspector T. F. Nuttman, of the RNLI, outlined their plans for the establishment of the station at Invergordon. They had found a suitable mooring site, and 17 men had come forward to form a crew.

It had also been decided that there wasn't enough shipping traffic to justify the expense of a new 18.5 kn (34.3 km/h; 21.3 mph) Arun-class lifeboat, so a 52-foot (Mk.I) Barnett-class lifeboat, Hilton Briggs (ON 889), built in 1951, and capable of just 9 knots (17 km/h; 10 mph), was initially placed on station. The lifeboat was made operational after training was completed in December 1974.

It would be 18-months later, on 3 July 1976, that the Invergordon lifeboat was first called. By now, the station had received its permanent lifeboat, another 52 ft (16 m) Mk.1 Barnett-class lifeboat, James and Margaret Boyd (ON 913). The Norwegian yacht Perkina caught fire and sank off Munlochy Bay, 16 nautical miles (30 km) from Invergordon, whilst on passage from Inverness to Norway. The two crew managed to get ashore in their life-raft, and the lifeboat was recalled before arriving on scene.

In 1976, an Inshore lifeboat was additionally placed at the station. The McLachlan-class lifeboat (A-508) was placed on station on 1 July for a trial period. The boat was only ever called upon once in a period of three years, and was withdrawn on 1 November 1979.

Invergordon would see the arrival of a new class of lifeboat in 1984. A 33-foot Brede-class lifeboat was placed on station. The new lifeboat was capable of 21 knots (39 km/h; 24 mph), more than twice the speed of the previous 9 kn (17 km/h; 10 mph) Barnett-class. At a ceremony on 4 May 1985, the lifeboat was named Nottinghamshire (ON 1102), having been funded by the Nottinghamshire Lifeboat Appeal 1982–1984.

New crew facilities were provided in 1992, when a station building was constructed next to the pier, with changing room, office, workshop, toilet and shower, and was officially opened on 13 June 1992 by The Duke of Atholl, Convenor of the Scottish Lifeboat Council. Also present at the ceremony was Hugh McCaig, patron of Ecurie Ecosse, whose Historic Motor Tour of 1991 had funded the building.

After receiving an assortment of no less than five very different lifeboats during its relatively short operational period of 21 years, just one lifeboat would serve the station for the next 25 years. Invergordon received the new £1.2 million 25 kn (46 km/h; 29 mph) Trent-class lifeboat on 4 May 1996. The lifeboat was funded from the bequest of the late Mr Douglas Aikman Smith of Dumfries, and at a ceremony on 17 August 1996, was duly named 14-08 Douglas Aikman Smith (ON 1206).

In unusual circumstances on 15 January 2002, the Invergordon lifeboat was called to the Ukrainian cargo vessel Est, where the first mate had allegedly taken his shipmates hostage. Launched at 07:45 into winds of gale force 8, the lifeboat quickly arrived at the vessel, anchored at the mouth of the Cromarty Firth, and stood by until 11:00, when a flare was then fired at the lifeboat. The flare landed in the sea, and the lifeboat then withdrew to a safe distance. After seeing a disturbance on board, one man jumped into the sea, and was recovered by the lifeboat. A further three men signaled that they wanted to leave the vessel. The lifeboat went alongside, and two men were taken off, but the third man jumped into the sea. Crew member Allan Lipp jumped into the water to save him. Recovered unconscious, the man responded to resuscitation. The first mate later gave himself up to the police. Second Coxswain Andrew Murray received 'A Framed Letter of Thanks signed by the Chairman of the Institution'.

In 2005, a new pontoon berth was constructed, at a cost of £77,000.

On 4 November 2020, Invergordon would finally see the arrival of the replacement for their Trent-class lifeboat. Construction of the new £2.1 million Shannon-class lifeboat had been completed in January 2020, but delivery had been delayed due to the COVID-19 pandemic. The lifeboat was the first to be partially funded by the 'Launch a Memory' fundraising campaign, where over 9500 individual private donors paid for their nominated name to be incorporated within the operational numbers on the side of the lifeboat. The primary donor for the lifeboat was the late Mrs Agnes Arthur Paton Barr, DStJ, from the family behind the soft-drinks company A.G. Barr, who left a bequest of £1 million to the RNLI, for the provision of a lifeboat. At a ceremony on Sunday 10 April 2022, the boat was formally named 13-37 Agnes A. P. Barr with a bottle of Irn-Bru.

== Station honours ==
The following are awards made at Invergordon.

- 'A Framed Letter of Thanks signed by the Chairman of the Institution'
  Andrew Murray, Second Coxswain – 2002
- Member, Order of the British Empire (MBE)
  William David Lipp, Chair, Lifeboat Management Group – 2025NYH

== Invergordon lifeboats ==
=== All-weather lifeboats ===
ON (Note: ON is the RNLI's Official Number of the boat.)	Op.No. (Note: Op. No. is the RNLI's Operational Number of the boat carried on the hull.)	Name	Built	On station	Class	Comments
889	−	Hilton Briggs	1951	1974−1975	52-foot Barnett (Mk.I)	Relief fleet lifeboat, first deployed at Aberdeen.
913	−	James and Margaret Boyd	1954	1975−1984	52-foot Barnett (Mk.I)	Previously at Stornoway and Macduff.
1102	33-10	Nottinghamshire	1984	1984−1988	Brede	Transferred to Oban.
1010	48-007	David & Elizabeth King & E. B.	1970	1988−1989	Solent	Previously at Longhope.
1033	44-012	The White Rose of Yorkshire	1974	1989−1996	Waveney	Previously at Whitby.
1206	14-08	Douglas Aikman Smith	1995	1996−2021	Trent	
1344	13-37	Agnes A. P. Barr	2020	2021−	Shannon	

More post-service details can be found on the respective lifeboat class pages.

=== Inshore lifeboats ===
Op.No.	Name	On station	Class	Comments
A-508	Unnamed	1976–1979	A-class (McLachlan)	

== See also ==
- List of RNLI stations
- List of former RNLI stations
- Royal National Lifeboat Institution lifeboats
