= Keith Nelson-class lifeboat =

Former RNLI lifeboat class

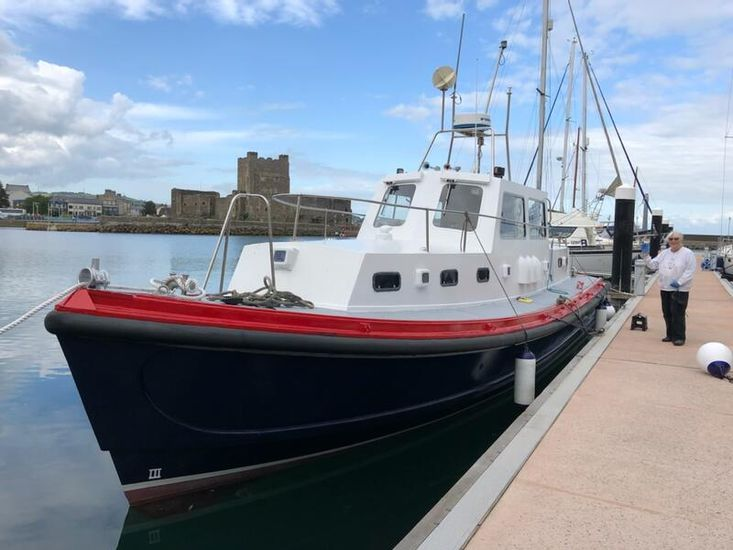
- RNLB Ernest William and Elizabeth Ellen Hinde (ON 1017), now Parhelia, at Carrickfergus, 2023.

Class overview
- Builders: Halmatic of Havant; Keith, Nelson & Co. Ltd of Bembridge; T.T. Boat Designs Ltd. of Bembridge
- Operators: Royal National Lifeboat Institution
- Built: 1968
- In service: 1969–1985
- Completed: 1
- Retired: 1

General characteristics
- Length: 40 ft (12 m)
- Beam: 12 ft (3.7 m)
- Propulsion: 2 x 125-hp Thornycroft T400 6-cylinder four-stroke turbo-charged diesel
- Speed: max: 19 knots (22 mph; 35 km/h)
- Range: 440Nm at 17 knots (20 mph; 31 km/h)
- Complement: 4

The Keith Nelson-class lifeboat was an experimental lifeboat, built for the Royal National Lifeboat Institution (RNLI), and designed to test the capabilities of a Glass Reinforced Plastic (GRP) hull in the most severe weather conditions, in order to assess its possibilities for future use in life-boat construction, which might allow higher speeds, and reduce construction costs.

== Design and Construction ==
The origins of the Keith Nelson-class lifeboat can be found back in 1955, when Peter Thornycroft, grandson of boat-builder John Thornycroft, founded a company along with Keith Butt and Arthur Nelson Crompton, becoming Keith, Nelson and Co. Ltd of Bembridge. The 34 ft (10 m) all-GRP Nelson 34 was produced successfully from 1962, and a 40 ft (12 m) version followed in 1964, built by Halmatic of Havant. Thornycroft then established T.T. Boat Designs Ltd. of Bembridge in 1965.

In 1968, the RNLI, ordered a standard 40 ft (12 m) boat, working on the design of the deck and internal layout in conjunction with T.T. Boat Designs Ltd. and Keith, Nelson & Co. Ltd. The boat was fitted with twin 125-hp Thornycroft T400 6-cylinder four-stroke turbo-charged diesel engines, providing a top speed of 19 knots (22 mph; 35 km/h), and a range of 380 nmi (700 km; 440 mi) at the cruising speed of 17 knots (20 mph; 31 km/h). The lifeboat, costing £24,559, was given the operational number 40-001, and named Ernest William and Elizabeth Ellen Hinde (ON 1017), funded from the legacy of Mrs Hinde. Just one boat was commissioned.

== Service ==
Ernest William and Elizabeth Ellen Hinde would first see service at the newly established station at Sheerness, arriving in April 1969. Her first service, on 26 April 1969, saw the rescue of three people from the yacht Degree, with first aid rendered to one man with a cut to his hand, and the yacht retrieved to Sheerness Docks.

By July, the boat was already away for repairs. A return to service in August was also short-lived, and she was replaced in late November 1969 by the 46-foot Watson-class lifeboat, Canadian Pacific (ON 803), a boat already over 30-years-old, and capable of just 8 1/2 knots. However, even in the short time on station at Sheerness, Ernest William and Elizabeth Ellen Hinde was called 32 times, saving 4 lives.

After being sent for a complete overhaul, Ernest William and Elizabeth Ellen Hinde was assigned in 1970 to Calshot, a lifeboat station sitting at the mouth of Southampton Water. She would serve there for the next 15 years, eventually being sold from service in 1985. During that time, she had been launched 199 times, recording 88 lives saved.

== Fleet ==
ON (Note: ON is the RNLI's Official Number of the boat.)	Op. No. (Note: Op. No. is the RNLI's Operational Number of the boat carried on the hull.)	Name	Built	In service	Station	Comments
1017	40-001	Ernest William and Elizabeth Ellen Hinde	1968	1969	Sheerness	(Note: Keith Nelson-class lifeboat, legacy of Mrs Hinde, built by Halmatic of Havant and Keith, Nelson and Co. Ltd. of Bembridge, with twin 125-hp Thornycroft T400 6-cylinder four-stroke turbo-charged diesel engines, costing £24,559.) Sold 1985. Renamed Parhelia, based at Carrickfergus until 2024, now in Castleford, West Yorkshire for restoration, February 2025.
1017	40-001	Ernest William and Elizabeth Ellen Hinde	1968	1970–1985	Calshot	Sold 1985. Renamed Parhelia, based at Carrickfergus until 2024, now in Castleford, West Yorkshire for restoration, February 2025.

== See also ==
- Royal National Lifeboat Institution lifeboats
