= Brede-class lifeboat =

Former RNLI lifeboat class

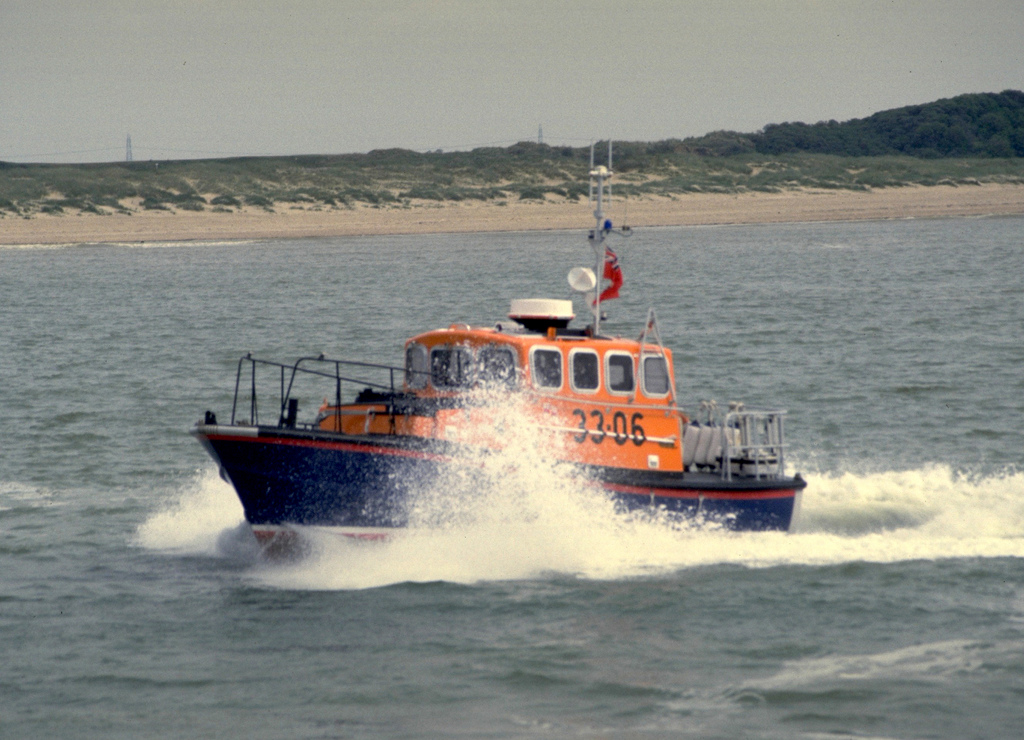

Class overview
- Builders: Lochin Marine International Ltd., Rye, East Sussex
- Operators: Royal National Lifeboat Institution; National Sea Rescue Institute SA; New Zealand Coast Rescue, Nelson
- Preceded by: Rother
- Succeeded by: Arun
- Built: 1981–1985
- In service: 1982–
- Completed: 10
- Active: 3
- Retired: 7

General characteristics
- Type: Motor lifeboat
- Displacement: 8.5 long tons (8.6 t)
- Length: 33 ft (10 m)
- Beam: 12 ft (3.7 m)
- Draught: 4 ft 3 in (1.30 m)
- Propulsion: 2 x 203-hp Caterpillar 3208 diesel
- Speed: 18.6 knots (21.4 mph)
- Range: 140 nautical miles (260 km)
- Capacity: 8 plus 1 stretcher
- Crew: 4

The Brede-class lifeboat was operated by the Royal National Lifeboat Institution (RNLI) from its stations around the coasts of the United Kingdom between 1982 and 2002, at which time it was the fastest all-weather lifeboat in its fleet. Eleven were put into service and when replaced by larger boats, seven were sold for further use as lifeboats, mainly in South Africa.

The class took its name from the River Brede which joins the River Rother to flow into the English Channel at Rye, Sussex.

== History ==
During the 1960s and 1970s, the RNLI had placed a number of fast lifeboats into service. These had mostly been 44 ft (13 m) Waveney-class lifeboats but there was a need for smaller, more manoeuvrable boats, but larger than the existing Atlantic 21 inshore lifeboats. A large boat, the Medina-class lifeboat, was built using the construction methods of the Atlantic 21, but untimately never went into production.

A prototype Brede was constructed in 1981, and the following year, the first two production Brede-class lifeboats were built. These had a larger wheelhouse than the prototype and placed in service at Fowey and Oban lifeboat stations in October.

Ten more production boats followed but production ceased in 1985. The first Brede to be withdrawn was RNLB Ann Richie (ON 1080), which only saw five years service. By the end of 1994, the fleet had been reduced to just five boats; three in the relief fleet and those stationed at Poole and Calshot. The boats had been too small to operate in extreme weather and surveys highlighted potential problems with structural strength.

Most of the fleet found new use with other rescue services. One was transported to New Zealand in 1993. Six were bought between 1994 and 2002 by the National Sea Rescue Institute in South Africa, with a seventh boat purchased privately in 2012 to replace Sanlam Rescuer (ON 1102), which was destroyed by fire awaiting refit.

In September 2016, the NSRI announced that they were embarking on a project to replace their ageing Brede lifeboat fleet, starting with Eikos Rescuer II (ON 1104) based in Durban, with further replacements planned for every two years. The Brede lifeboats will be sold out of the fleet as they are replaced. As of December 2025, two are still in service.

== Description ==
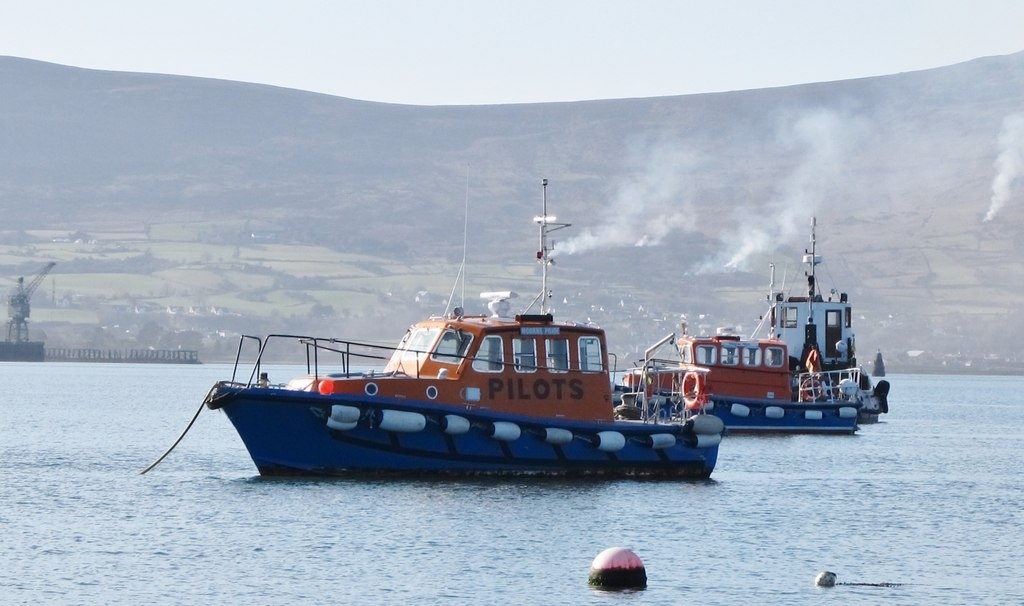
33-04 Philip Vaux (ON 1084), now Mourne Mist on Carlingford Lough, 2011

The Brede was built with a glass reinforced plastic (GRP) hull, a strengthened version of a commercial design by Lochin Marine of Rye, Sussex. It was fitted with twin 203 bhp (151 kW) 10.4 L (630 cu in) Caterpillar 3208 diesel engines, which gave it a top speed of 20 knots (37 km/h). This was faster than any other all-weather lifeboat in the fleet, until the introduction of the Severn and Trent classes in 1991. It had an operating range of 140 nautical miles (260 km).

The hull was divided into five water-tight compartments, and spaces were filled with buoyant materials, which combined with a watertight GRP wheelhouse, to give it a self-righting capability. A survivors' cabin was sited forward of the wheelhouse with eight seats, and a stretcher could be carried in the wheelhouse, which had seats for the four crew members.

== RNLI fleet ==
All built by Lochin Marine, Rye

ON (Note: ON is the RNLI's Official Number of the boat.)	Op. No. (Note: Op. No. is the RNLI's Operational Number of the boat carried on the hull.)	Name	Built	In service	Station	Comments
1066	33-01	Unnamed	1981	1981–1982	Trials	Sold 1983. Renamed John Alexander. Used as a workboat at Yarmouth. Last reported as a workboat, Berth 24/25, Southampton East Docks, July 2019.
1080	33-02	Ann Richie	1982	1982–1987	Oban	(Note: Gift of Mrs Ritchie, built by Lochin Marine, costing £110,000.) Broken up, 1988.
1083	33-03	Leonore Chilcott	1982	1982–1987	Fowey	(Note: Gift of Mr Paul Chilcott, built by Lochin Marine, costing £155,475.) Sold 1990. Renamed Privateer, used as a dive support boat at Littlehampton. Pilot boat Leonore Chilcott since 2000 at Braye, Alderney, October 2025. MMSI 235104864
1084	33-04	Philip Vaux	1982	1983–1989	Girvan	(Note: Legacy of Mrs Vaux, built by Lochin Marine, costing £150,000.) Sold 1990. Renamed R.T.K., later Sea Truck 4 at Poole. As Pilot boat Mourne Mist since 2009 at Greencastle Carlingford Lough, November 2025. MMSI 235084945
1087	33-05	Merchant Navy	1983	1983–1987	Relief fleet	(Note: Funded by the 'Merchant Navy Lifeboat Appeal', built by Lochin Marine, costing £150,000.) Sold 1990. Pleasure boat Lyonesse on the River Hamble. Sold 2012, to NSRI, South Africa, for further use as a lifeboat.
1087	33-05	Merchant Navy	1983	1987–1989	Oban	Sold 1990. Pleasure boat Lyonesse on the River Hamble. Sold 2012, to NSRI, South Africa, for further use as a lifeboat.
1088	33-06	Caroline Finch	1983	1983–1994	Exmouth	(Note: Legacies of Mr Finch, Mr Rohill, Mrs Shaw and Mr Orley, built by Lochin Marine, costing £150,000.) Sold 1994. To NSRI, South Africa. See below:–
1089	33-07	Inner Wheel	1983	1983–2001	Poole	(Note: Gift of the Inner Wheel Clubs of Gt. Britain and Ireland, built by Lochin Marine, costing £155,000.) Sold 2002. To NSRI, South Africa. See below:–
1089	33-07	Inner Wheel	1983	2001–2002	Calshot	Sold 2002. To NSRI, South Africa. See below:–
1090	33-08	Foresters Future	1984	1984–1986	Alderney	(Note: Gift of the Ancient Order of Foresters, built by Lochin Marine, costing £145,000.) Sold 2002. To NSRI, South Africa. See below:–
1090	33-08	Foresters Future	1984	1986–2002	Relief fleet	Sold 2002. To NSRI, South Africa. See below:–
1101	33-09	Enid of Yorkshire	1984	1984–1997	Relief fleet	(Note: Gift of Mr Sanderson, built by Lochin Marine, costing £150,000.) Sold 1997. To NSRI, South Africa. See below:–
1102	33-10	Nottinghamshire	1984	1984–1988	Invergordon	(Note: Funded by the 'Nottinghamshire LB Appeal', built by Lochin Marine, costing £145,000.) Sold 1997. To NSRI, South Africa. See below:–
1102	33-10	Nottinghamshire	1984	1989–1997	Oban	Sold 1997. To NSRI, South Africa. See below:–
1104	33-11	Safeway	1985	1985–2001	Calshot	(Note: Funded by the 'Safeway Food Stores LB Appeal', built by Lochin Marine, costing £155,000.) Sold 2002. To NSRI, South Africa. See below:–
1105	33-12	Amateur Swimming Associations	1985	1985–1989	Relief fleet	(Note: Funded by the 'Amateur Swimming Association, built by Lochin Marine, costing £160,000.) Sold September 1993. To New Zealand Coast Rescue, Nelson. See below:–
1105	33-12	Amateur Swimming Associations	1985	1989–1993	Girvan	Sold September 1993. To New Zealand Coast Rescue, Nelson. See below:–

== Other fleets ==
=== New Zealand ===
Operated by New Zealand Coast Rescue, Nelson

RNLI ON	Name	In service	Station	Comments
1105	Sealord Rescue	1993–2011	Port Nelson	Sold 2012. Renamed Girvan. Last reported restored to RNLI livery, at Queen Charlotte Sound, Picton, New Zealand, March 2021.

=== South Africa ===
Former RNLI Brede-Class lifeboats operated by the National Sea Rescue Institute (NSRI) in South Africa. As from 2019, the NSRI has embarked on a project to replace the ageing Brede fleet with a new class of lifeboat.

RNLI ON	Name	In service	Station	Comments
1087	Rescue 15	2012–2021	Mossel Bay (Rescue 15)	Acquired from UK to replace Sanlam Rescuer, 2012. Refit completed 6 November 2012; Decommissioned May 2021. Last reported as a workboat with Bridge Maritime Ltd, SA, February 2022.
1088	South Star	1994–2021	Hermanus (Rescue 17)	Refit 2011. Sold 2022. Last reported as a workboat with Bridge Maritime Ltd, SA, February 2022.
1089	Nadine Gordimer	2002–	Hout Bay (Rescue 8)	Refit March 2012, completed 20 February 2013. MMSI 601029700.
1090	Spirit of Safmarine III	2002–2021	Simon's Town (Rescue 10)	Refit 2014 at Treetops Marine. Moved to Station 15 Mossel Bay in May 2021. MMSI 601029500.
1090	Spirit of Safmarine III	2021–	Mossel Bay (Rescue 15)	Refit 2014 at Treetops Marine. Moved to Station 15 Mossel Bay in May 2021. MMSI 601029500.
1101	Spirit of Toft	1997–2024	Port Elizabeth (Rescue 6)	Refit in Cape Town, 2017. Retired February 2024. Last reported in private ownership, Port Elizabeth, December 2024. MMSI 601105100.
1102	Sanlam Rescuer	1997–2010	Gordons Bay (Rescue 9)	Destroyed by fire whilst awaiting refit, December 2010.
1104	Eikos Rescuer II	2002–2019	Durban (Rescue 5)	Sold 2019. Renamed Bosss Charger, workboat with Bosss Marine, Durban, SA, November 2025. MMSI 601664000.

== See also ==
- Royal National Lifeboat Institution lifeboats
