= Calshot Lifeboat Station =

RNLI lifeboat station in Hampshire, England

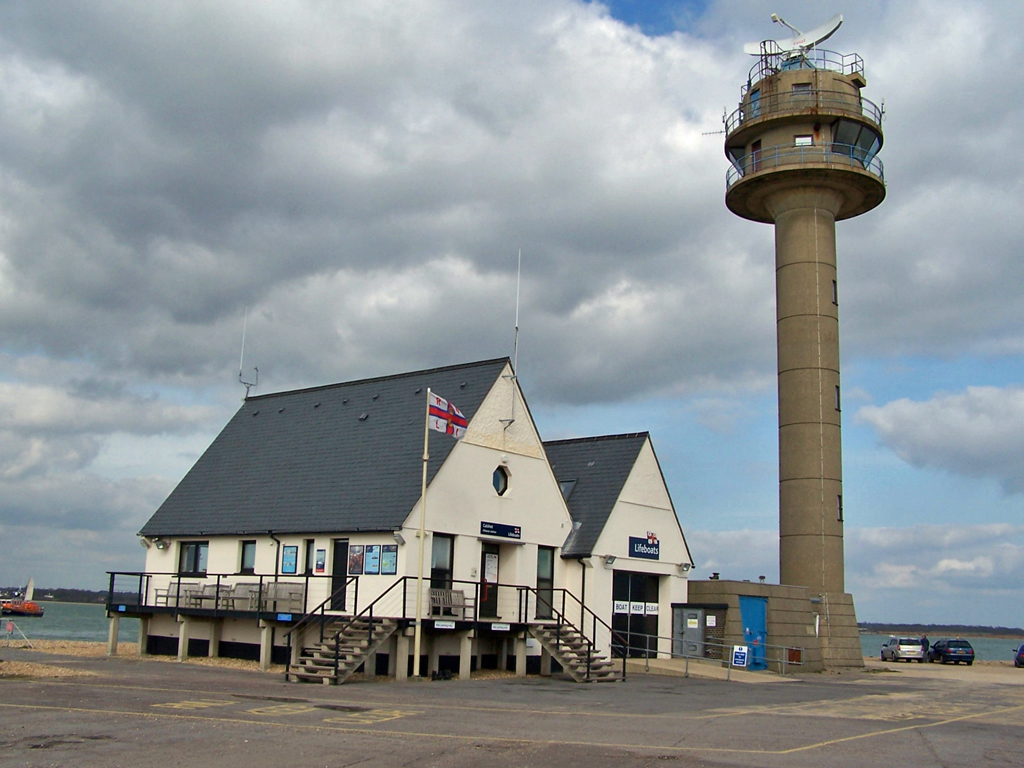
- Calshot Lifeboat Station

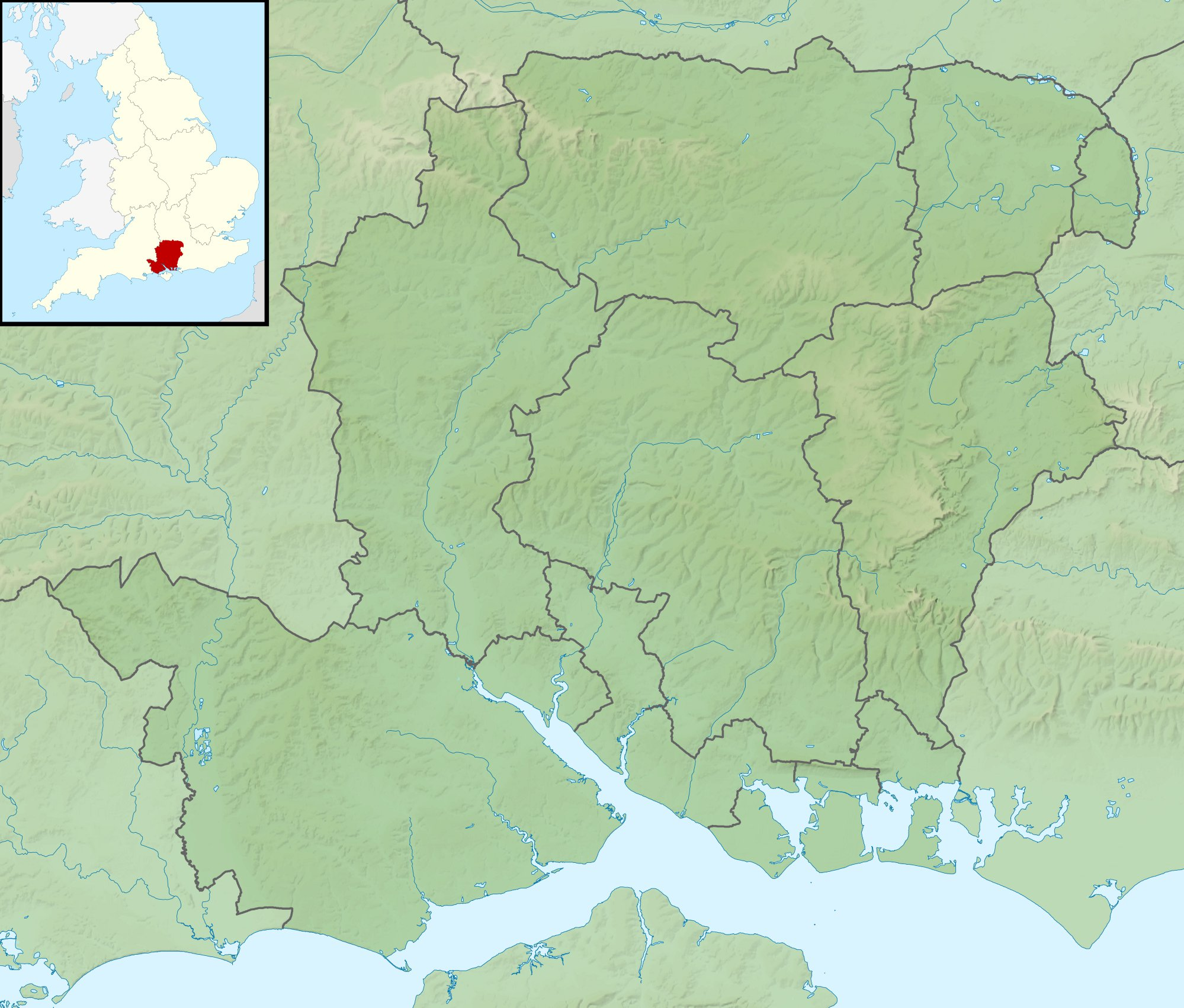
- Location within Hampshire

General information
- Type: RNLI lifeboat station
- Location: Calshot Activity Centre, Calshot, Hampshire, SO45 1BR, England
- Coordinates: 50°49′12.8″N 1°18′30.1″W
- Opened: 1970
- Owner: Royal National Lifeboat Institution

Technical details
- Material: Masonry, brick, on concrete stanchions

Website
- Calshot RNLI Lifeboat Station

Calshot Lifeboat Station is located on Calshot Spit near the village of Calshot, Hampshire, and is on the western bank of the open end of Southampton Water, on the south coast of England.

A lifeboat station was established at Calshot in 1970 by the Royal National Lifeboat Institution (RNLI).

The station currently operates the larger B-class (Atlantic 85) Inshore lifeboat, Max Walls (B-860), on station since 2012, and the smaller D-class (IB1) Inshore lifeboat, David Radcliffe (D-880), on station since 2023.

== History ==
Until its closure in 1961, Calshot Spit had been the site of RAF Calshot, which was the primary seaplane/flying boat development and training unit in the United Kingdom.

After the departure of the RAF, Hampshire County Council opened an educational activities centre on the site. The centre was regularly being asked by HM Coastguard to use its boats, to go out and rescue people in trouble off shore. Col. Philip Keymer MC, warden of the centre, established negotiations with the RNLI, with a view to there being a more formalised rescue service for this busy stretch of water. The RNLI spent a year evaluating this proposition and as a result, an RNLI lifeboat station was established on the site in 1970.

=== 1970–1985: early lifeboats ===
The first lifeboat to be stationed at Calshot was the 40 ft (12 m) Keith Nelson-type lifeboat, 40-001 Ernest William and Elizabeth Ellen Hinde (ON 1017). The lifeboat was a new experimental type boat, constructed from GRP, designed by T.T. Boat Designs Ltd., of Bembridge, and moulded by Halmatic Ltd., of Havant, for Keith Nelson Ltd., of Bembridge. Powered by two Thornycroft T400 6-cylinder four-stroke turbo-charged diesel engines, the lifeboat had a maximum speed of 19 knots, a cruising speed of 17 knots, and a range at cruising speed of 440 miles (710 km). The lifeboat was initially placed on station at Sheerness in 1969, transferred to Calshot in 1970. Although lacking in self-righting capability, she was viewed as a successful experiment in the use of fibreglass for lifeboats, but it was the only lifeboat of this type placed in service with the RNLI.

On the evening of 10 January 1976, during gale force 8 to 9 winds and a choppy sea, the Calshot lifeboat was called to help a small motorboat, which had been driven ashore on salt marsh in the Ashlett Creek channel. As the water was too shallow for the All-weather lifeboat, the lifeboat crew waded through the marshes, dragging the inflatable boarding boat while they looked for the vessel. Eventually the vessel's three crewmen were located and rescued. Peter King, John Street and Christopher Smith were each awarded the RNLI Bronze Medal for the difficult rescue.

The second lifeboat at the station was the Brede-class lifeboat Safeway (ON 1104), which was moored just off Calshot Castle. The crew used a davit-launched boarding boat when called out on service. Safeway, which was funded by and named for the Safeway supermarket chain, was built by Lochin Marine at Newhaven, East Sussex in 1985. Like the Ernest William and Elizabeth Ellen Hinde, she had a fibreglass hull but was self-righting due to her watertight cabin.

=== 1996–2007: new facilities and lifeboats ===
In 1996, the RNLI funded the construction of new shore facilities for Calshot Station, constructed on concrete stanchions to prevent flooding. Hampshire County Council provided a new boarding jetty for use jointly by the lifeboat station and the Calsholt Activity Centre.

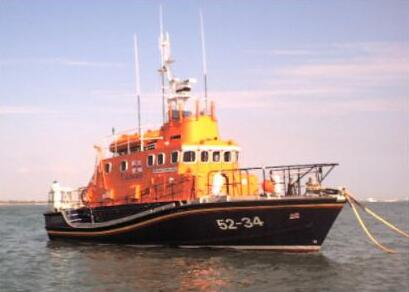
The Arun-class lifeboat Margaret Russell Fraser (ON 1108)

The Safeway was withdrawn from service in December 2001 and replaced by the former Poole-based Brede Inner Wheel, which was itself replaced after only a few months by the Arun-class lifeboat Margaret Russell Fraser (ON 1108). Margaret Russell Fraser had come across the Solent from Yarmouth Lifeboat Station on the Isle of Wight, where she had been a part of RNLI's relief fleet. She arrived in 2002 and was replaced in 2004 by another Arun-class, the Mabel Williams (ON 1159).

In 2001, the station was given its first D-class (EA16) Inshore lifeboat from the relief fleet. She was called RJM (D-429). 2003 also saw improvements made to the station facilities. At the cost of £266,424 an extension was added to the side of the station.

Arun-class lifeboats were withdrawn from service in 2007. The Mabel Williams was replaced by the Tyne-class Sarah Emily Harrop (ON 1155), which was moved to the relief fleet in January 2010 and replaced by the Tyne-class Alexander Coutanche (ON 1157).

=== 2012–present: reorganisation ===
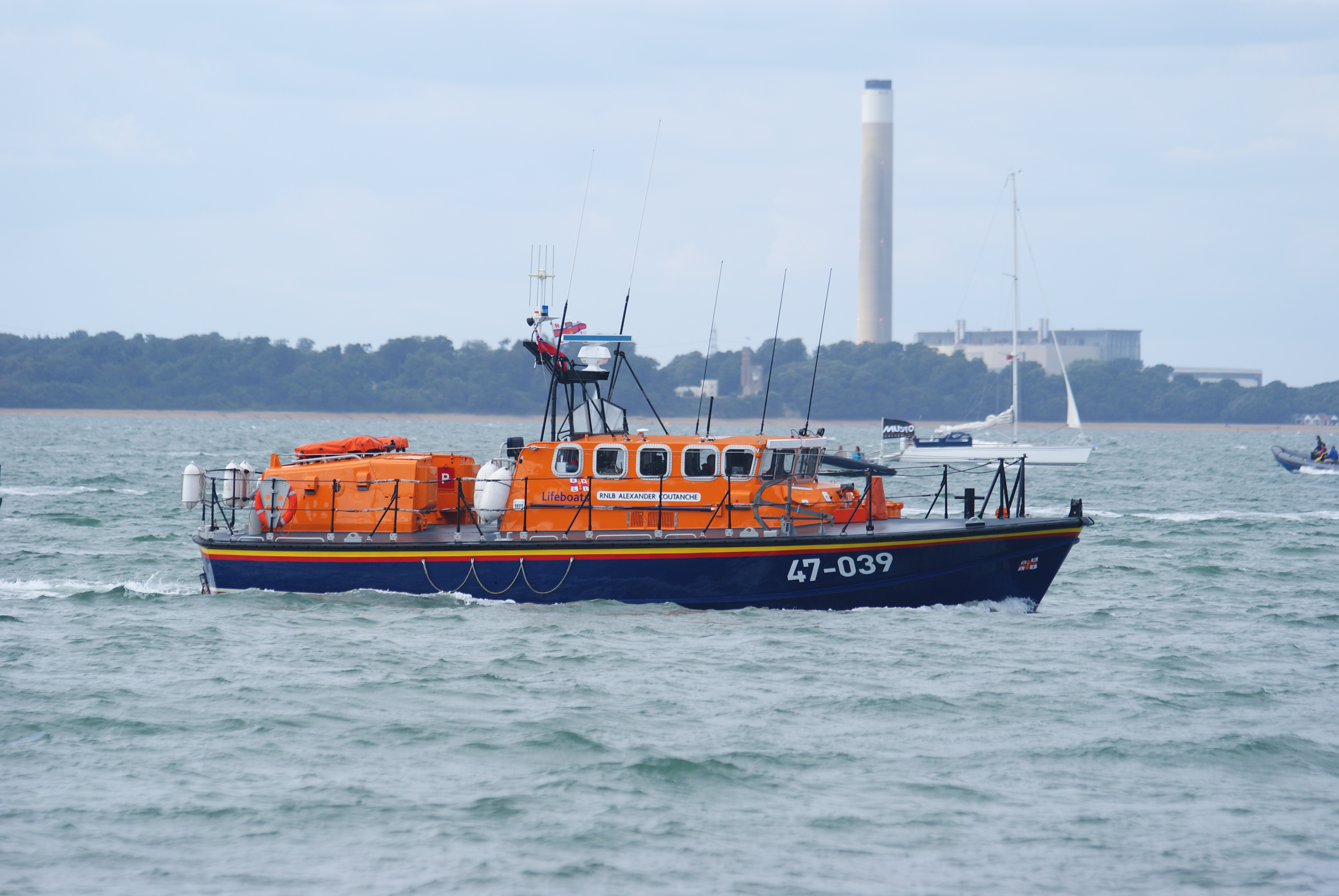
The Tyne-class Alexander Coutanche (ON 1157) - service 21 January 2010 to 2012

In 2012, the Calshot board of trustees decided that Calshot would cease to be an all-weather station; consequently the Tyne-class lifeboat was withdrawn on 4 April. In its place an Atlantic 85-class inshore lifeboat was sent to the station, necessitating improved facilities had been made at the station to accommodate the new lifeboat and its required launch tractor, a new lifeboat arrived and the Alexander Coutanche was withdrawn.

On 11 July 2012, the new B-class (Atlantic 85) Max Walls (B-860) was placed on the station along with a new New Holland Launch tractor and the Calsholt was officially re-designated as an Inshore lifeboat station.

== Station honours ==
The following are awards made at Calshot.

- RNLI Bronze Medal
  Peter King, Emergency Mechanic – 1976
  John Street, crew member – 1976
  Christopher Smith, crew member – 1976
- A Framed Letter of Thanks signed by the Chairman of the Institution
  Duncan Christie, Helm – 2001
- Framed Commendation from the RNLI Medical Director
  Andy Headley – 2023
  Kelley Leonard – 2023
  Damian Lester – 2023
  Chris McDonald – 2023
- British Empire Medal
  John Horton – 2020NYH

== Calshot lifeboats ==
=== All-weather lifeboats ===
On station	ON (Note: ON is the RNLI's Official Number of the boat.)	Op. No. (Note: Op. No. is the RNLI's Operational Number of the boat carried on the hull.)	Name	Class	Comments
1970–1985	1017	40-001	Ernest William & Elizabeth Ellen Hinde	Keith Nelson	First stationed at Sheerness in 1969.
1985–2001	1104	33-11	Safeway	Brede	Sold for further use as a lifeboat in Durba, South Africa, where it was named Eikos Rescuer II. Retired in 2019 and now a workboat named Bosss Charger.
2001–2002	1089	33-07	Inner Wheel	Brede	First stationed at Poole in 1983. Sold in 2002 for further use as a lifeboat in Hout Bay, South Africa when it was named Spirit of Nadine Gordimer.
2002–2004	1108	52-34	Margaret Russell Fraser	Arun	Initially deployed in the Relief Fleet in 1986. Sold for further use as a lifeboat in Höfn, Iceland and renamed Ingbjörg, number 2629.
2004–2007	1159	52-45	Mabel Williams	Arun	First stationed at Ballyglass in 1990. Sold in 2007 for use in China as lifeboat Huaying 391.
2007–2010	1155	47-037	Sarah Emily Harrop	Tyne	First stationed at Lytham St Annes in 1990. Sold in 202 for use as a ferry/pilot boat for Bere Island in Ireland.
2010–2012	1157	47-039	Alexander Coutanche	Tyne	First stationed at St Helier in 1989. Sold in 2014 and reported in 2023 to be a work boat in Swansea.

All-weather lifeboat withdrawn, 2012

=== Inshore lifeboats ===
==== D-class ====
On station	Op. No.	Name	Class	Comments
2001–2002	D-429	RJM	D-class (EA16)	First stationed at Blackpool in 1992.
2002–2003	D-418	Unnamed	D-class (EA16)	Initially deployed as a relief lifeboat in 1991.
2003	D-407	The Marlborough Club, Didcot	D-class (EA16)	Initially deployed as a relief lifeboat in 1990.
2003–2011	D-609	248 Squadron RAF	D-class (IB1)	
2011–2023	D-748	Willett	D-class (IB1)	
2023–	D-880	David Radcliffe	D-class (IB1)	

==== B-class ====
On station	Op. No.	Name	Class	Comments
2012–	B-860	Max Walls	B-class (Atlantic 85)	

== See also ==
- List of RNLI stations
- List of former RNLI stations
- Royal National Lifeboat Institution lifeboats
