= Calshot =

Village in Hampshire, England

Coordinates: 50°48′37″N 1°19′22″W

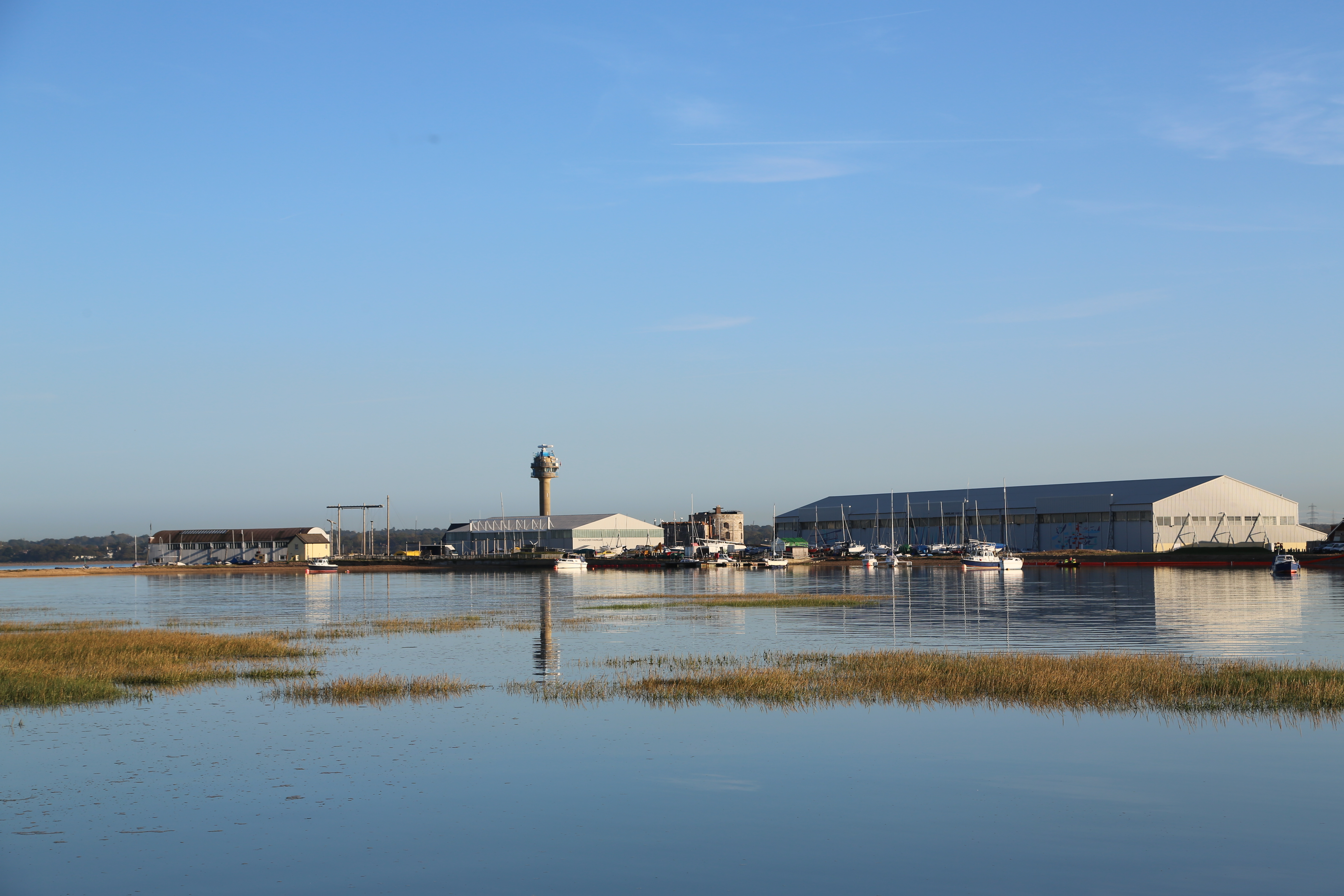
- Buildings at the end of Calshot spit viewed across Calshot marshes

- Location within Hampshire
- OS grid reference: SU47810142
- District: New Forest
- Shire county: Hampshire
- Region: South East
- Country: England
- Sovereign state: United Kingdom
- Post town: SOUTHAMPTON
- Postcode district: SO45
- Dialling code: 023
- Police: Hampshire and Isle of Wight
- Fire: Hampshire and Isle of Wight
- Ambulance: South Central
- UK Parliament: New Forest East

Calshot is a coastal village in Hampshire, England, at the west corner of Southampton Water where it joins the Solent.

== History ==
In 1539, Henry VIII ordered the construction of Calshot Castle, at the end of Calshot Spit, to defend the port of Southampton from attack. Its strategic importance continues to the present day, and there is still a military presence in Calshot, though the castle is no longer a manned fort.

Calshot is notable for its role in the development of aircraft and flying boats. In 1913 the Royal Flying Corps established Calshot Naval Air Station (later known as RNAS Calshot and RAF Calshot) at the end of Calshot Spit. It was also at one point home to Lawrence of Arabia.

Calshot Lifeboat Station was established in 1970 by the RNLI.

=== Relationship with Tristan da Cunha ===
Following a volcanic eruption in 1961, the population of the Tristan da Cunha islands was evacuated to Calshot. Many evacuees thrived, with the children attending local schools and adults employed in a variety of local businesses and on ships. However, problems occurred: one of the islanders' elders, a disabled gentleman called Ian Bootla, was mugged, the islanders lacked immunity from flu epidemics, and they also had to endure the harsh winter of 1962–63. Most of the islanders returned home, but some of the families decided to stay and remain a close-knit community centred on a complex of 50 houses called Tristan Close. Those that returned to Tristan da Cunha renamed the harbour there Calshot Harbour, after their temporary home.

== Today ==
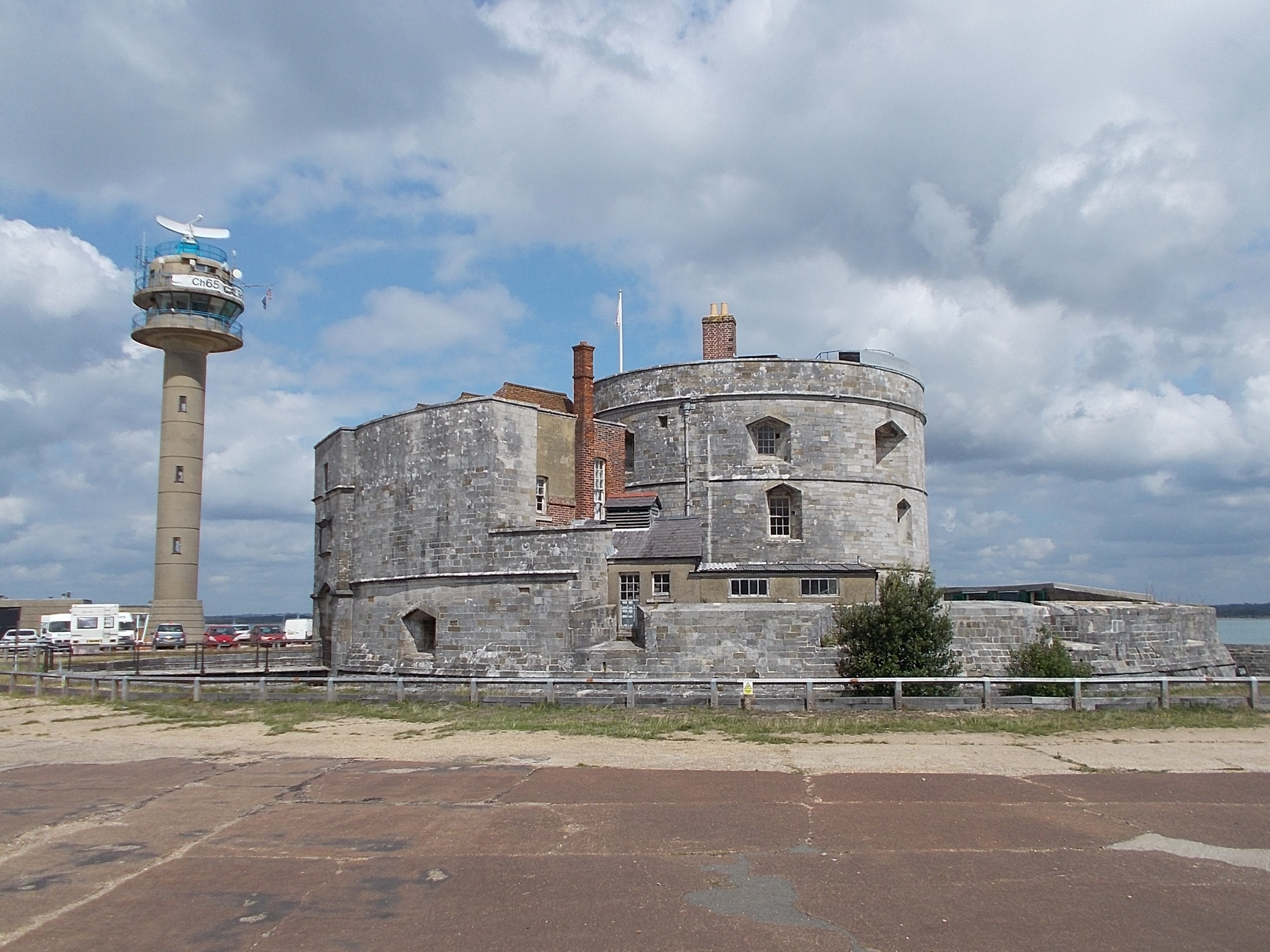
Calshot Castle and Coastguard Tower

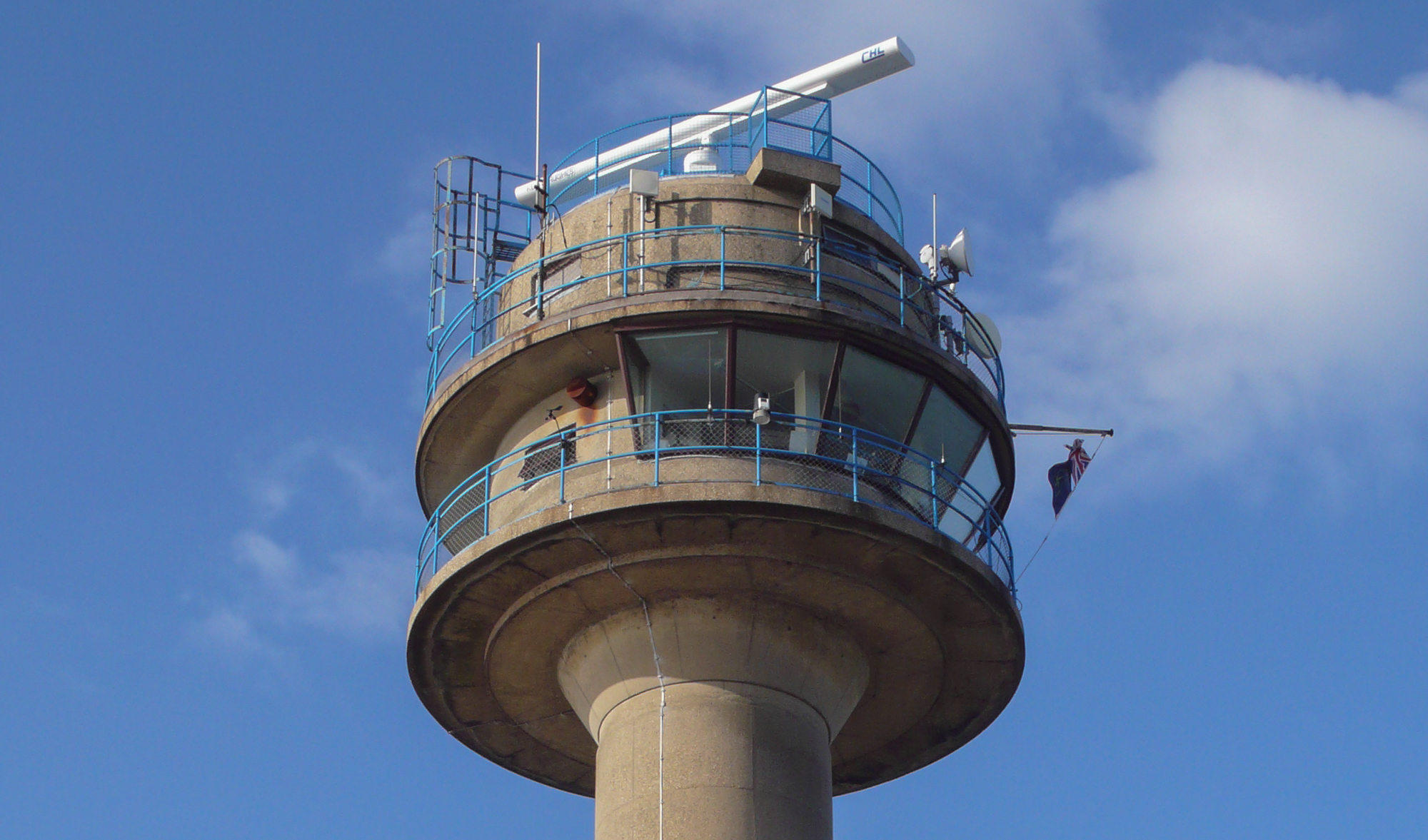
Close up of NCI – Calshot Tower

The original hangar from the World War II flying boats remains as an activity centre for watersports (including kite-surfing), climbing, snowboarding and track cycling. There is a small indoor velodrome, a dry ski slope, and facilities for climbing and bouldering. The climbing grades vary from about 3 to the occasional 8a. The centre offers residential and visitor courses.

Next to the hangar is a dinghy marina. The approach road passes on the landward side of the spit, and there are a large number of beach huts.

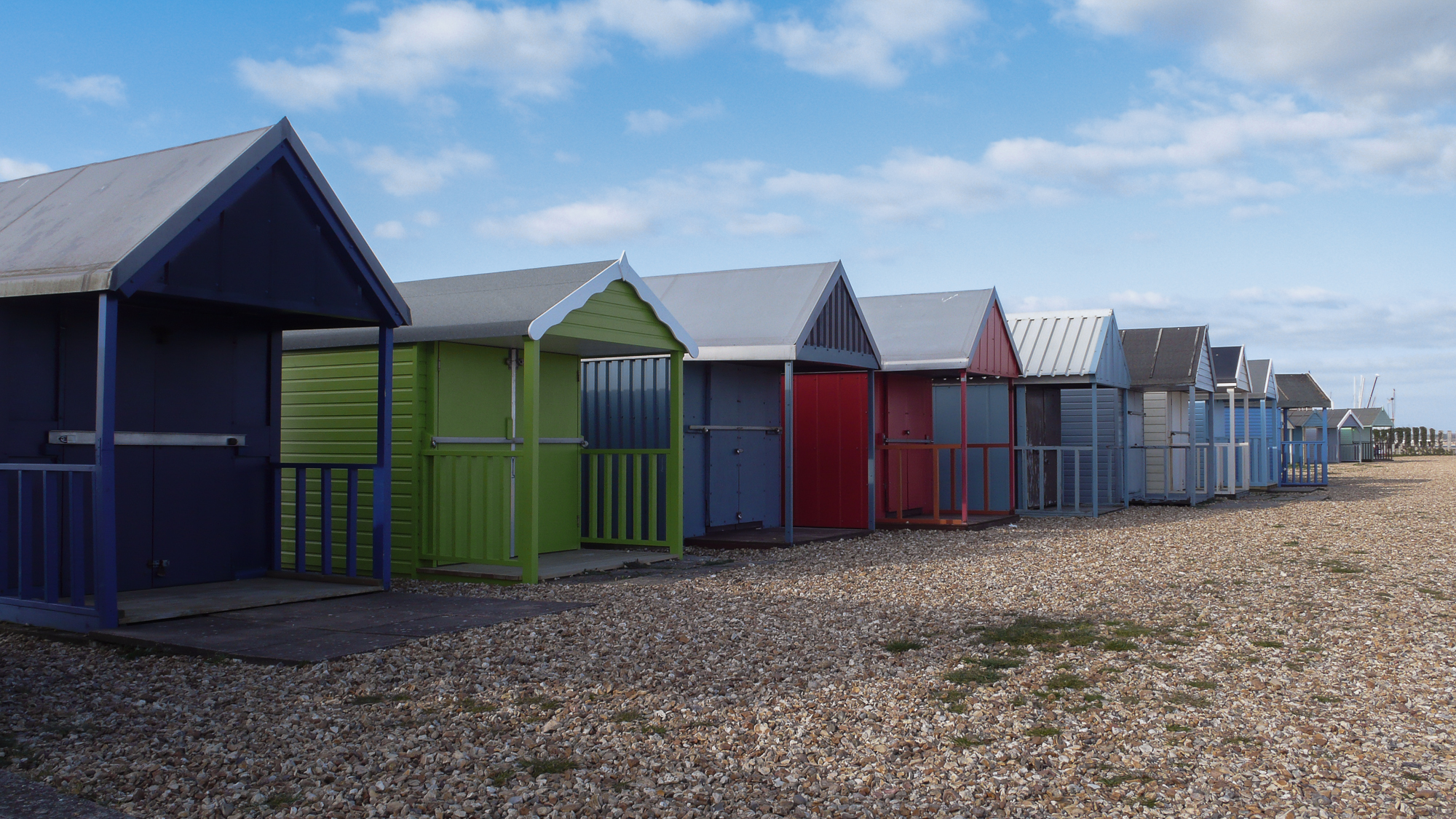
Row of beach huts at Calshot

The spit comprises a flint pebble structure around one mile long. Between it and the main shore is a salt marshy area with a wealth of wildlife and birds. The nearby Fawley Power Station discharged cooling water into the shallow waters around Calshot beach, and this has led to some reports of warm water species being attracted into the Solent. The Habitats Directive Review of Consents for the Solent Maritime Special Area of Conservation (SAC) did indeed identify thermal pollution on the intertidal zone on the west shore of Southampton Water, but this is likely to be from more than this one source. Excavation for the nearby power station discovered buried land surfaces from the Neolithic period.

== See also ==
- Calshot Spit
- Calshot Castle
- Calshot Lifeboat Station
- RAF Calshot
- RNAS Calshot
