= Brighton Lifeboat Station =

RNLI lifeboat station in East Sussex, England

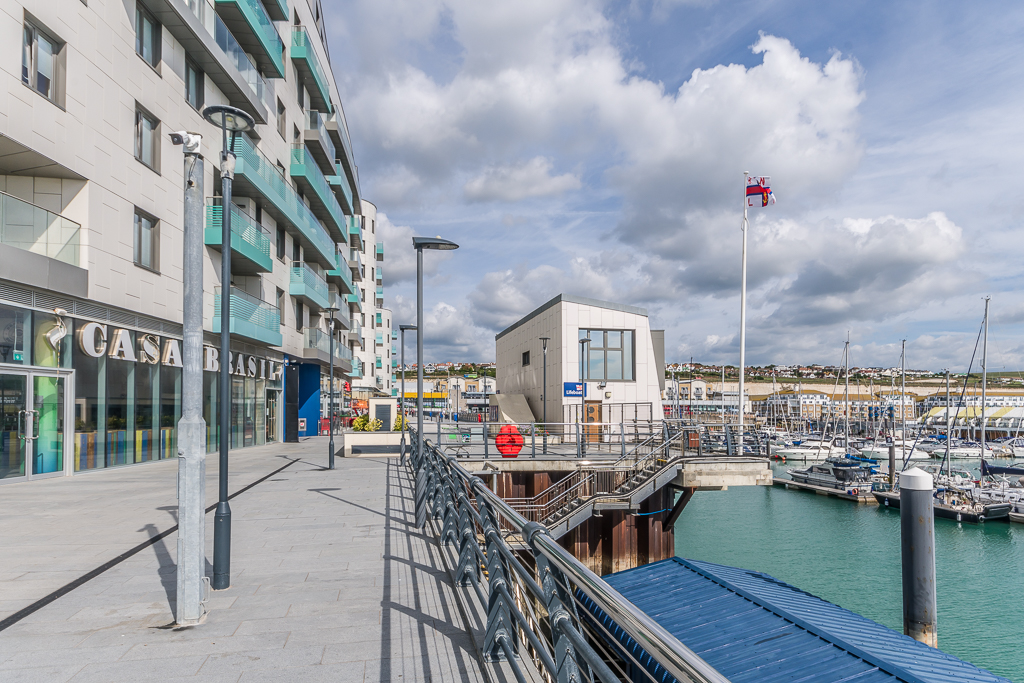
- Brighton Lifeboat Station

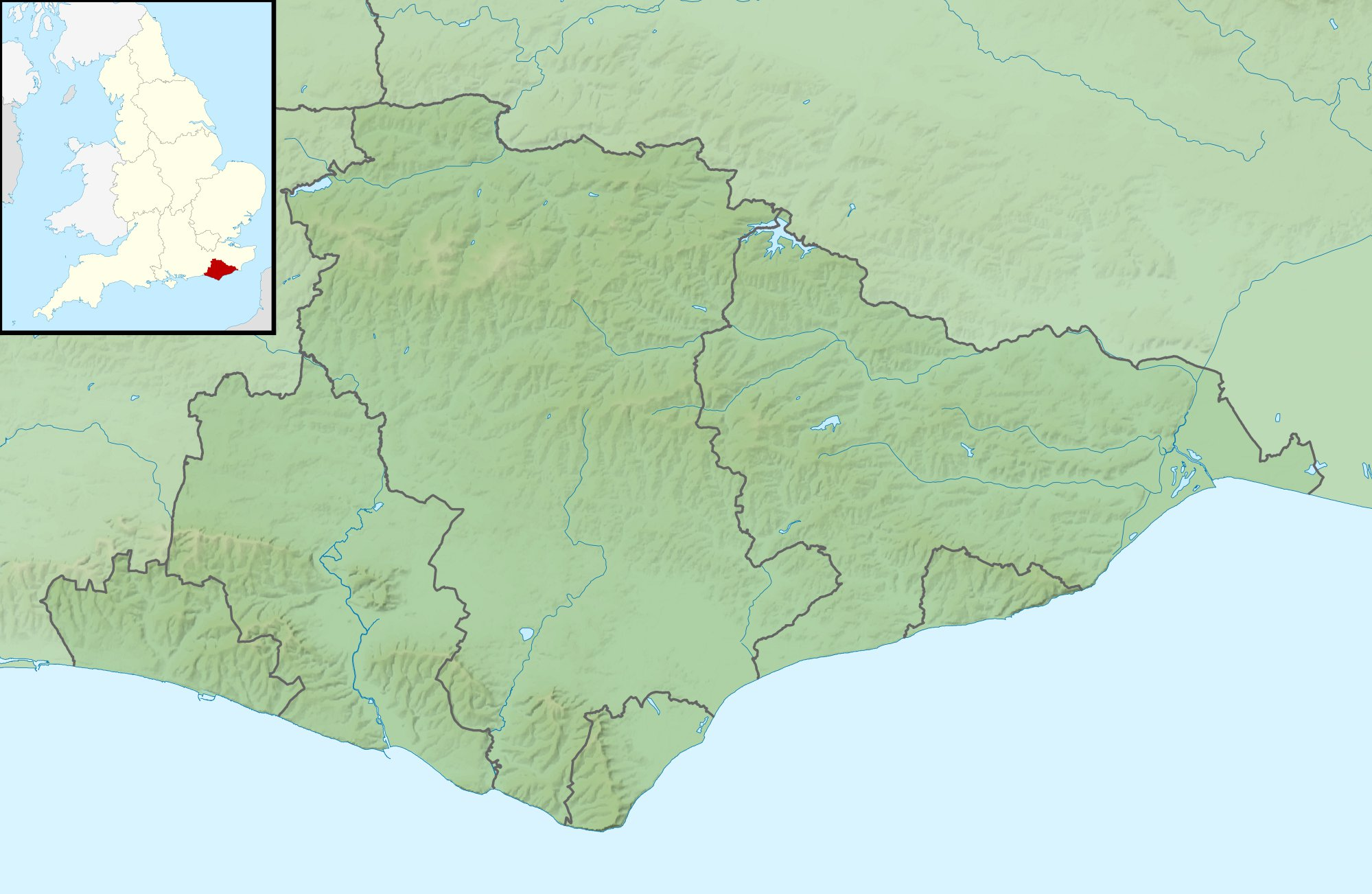
- Location within East Sussex

General information
- Type: RNLI Lifeboat Station
- Architectural style: Steel-frame Boathouse with brick and block construction
- Location: The Boardwalk, Brighton Marina, Brighton, East Sussex, BN2 5ZB, England
- Coordinates: 50°48′38.4″N 0°06′13.9″W
- Opened: 1809–1816; 1825–1932; 1965–present
- Owner: Royal National Lifeboat Institution

Website
- Brighton RNLI Lifeboat Station

Brighton Lifeboat Station is located in the seaside town of Brighton in the county of East Sussex.

The station is located in the marina area of Brighton and is co-ordinated from H.M. Coastguard at Lee-on-Solent. Being an inshore station, the majority of the station's services are within two miles of the station. The station is called to an average of sixty rescues a year.

A lifeboat was first placed at Brighton in 1809. A lifeboat station was first established by the Royal National Institution for the Preservation of Life from Shipwreck (RNIPLS) in 1825, operating until 1837. Then followed a succession of privately operated lifeboats, some continuing in service until 1932. A new lifeboat station was opened by the Royal National Lifeboat Institution (RNLI) in 1858, which was in operation until 1931.

Brighton Lifeboat Station was re-opened in 1965 as an Inshore lifeboat station. It currently operates a B-class (Atlantic 85) Inshore lifeboat, Random Harvest (B-852), on station since 2011.

== History ==
The first lifeboat to be placed at Brighton was a 22-foot long lifeboat, one of 31 built by Henry Greathead of South Shields, from his design of 1789 known as the Original. It had been placed at Newhaven in 1803, but this type of lifeboat was designed to work in the shallow waters off the east coast of England, and was not well liked at Newhaven.

Previously funded by Mr. John Godlee, with a £50 donation from Lloyd's of London, and with both parties in agreement, the boat was transferred to Brighton, arriving in 1909. No service records have been found, other than in 1816, the boat was reported to have 'rotted away'.

The Royal National Institution for the Preservation of Life from Shipwreck (RNIPLS), the forerunner of the RNLI, established a lifeboat station in Brighton in 1825. The lifeboat for this station was kept in a cave, close to the Chain Pier. The service operated from this cave until 1837, when the construction of the Madeira sea-wall and Madeira Drive was completed. At that time, the RNIPLS lifeboat was withdrawn.

However, 1837 saw the introduction of a series of private lifeboats, operated by Brighton Humane Society, Brighton Town Council, and Mr. John Wright, the latter using a boat formerly operated by the Humane Society.

=== 1857–1932 ===
In 1854, the RNIPLS became the RNLI. Following a public meeting in Brighton in 1857, the RNLI agreed to establish a new lifeboat station at Brighton. A 30-foot Self-righting 'pulling and sailing' (P&S) lifeboat, one with oars and sails, was ordered from Forrestt of Limehouse. After trials on the Regent's Canal on 17 June 1858, the boat, and its new carriage, were transported to Brighton free of charge by the London, Brighton and South Coast Railway, arriving in July 1858. An Arch under the east promenade was provided as a boathouse by Brighton Town Council for a peppercorn rent of one-shilling per annum. The lifeboat, which was never named, made only 3 launches on service.

The RNLI provided a new boat for Brighton in 1867. Funded from money raised by Sunday School children, the lifeboat was named Robert Raikes after the philanthropist and Anglican layman. 24,000 children were present when the boat was formally handed to the RNLI at the Agricultural Hall, in Islington. A new boathouse, with a flat roof, was constructed on the beach, opposite the Bedford Hotel, close to the West Pier. Under the terms of the lease, the flat roof "had to be made available for local Band Concerts".

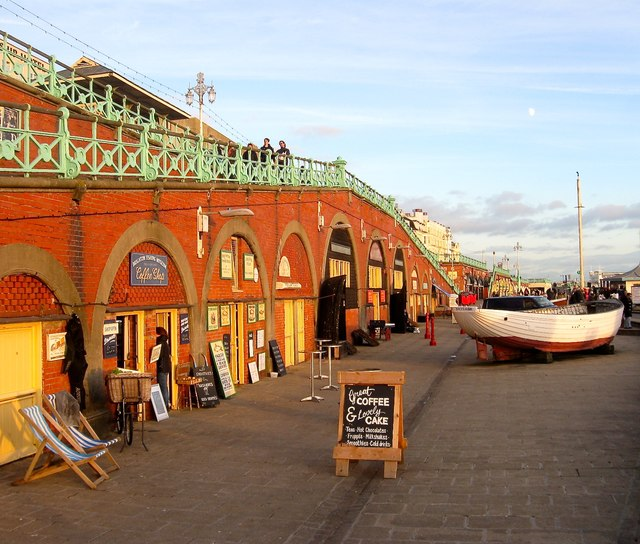
Lifeboat Arches, Brighton

The 1867 boathouse would be in use for just 20 years. In 1885, much of the beach was washed away, and new groynes were installed to recapture the sand. This created much difficulty when trying to launch the lifeboat, so two arches, No. 109 and No. 110, in the newly created western promenade, were leased to the RNLI. One was used for storage, and the other to house the new 34-foot lifeboat which arrived in 1888. Sunlight No. 2 (ON 145) was one of two lifeboats funded from a 'Sunlight Soap Competition' by Lever Brothers, Sunlight No.1 (ON 124) being placed at Llandudno. Arch No. 111 was used to house the Brighton Town Council lifeboat John Whittingham.

In 1929, heavy silting at the entrance to Shoreham harbour disappeared, and the RNLI re-opened the Shoreham Harbour Lifeboat Station, with a motor-powered lifeboat. The Brighton RNLI lifeboat William Wallis (ON 539) was withdrawn on 7 July 1931, and the RNLI station closed. The Brighton Town Council boat John Whittingham was withdrawn in 1932.

=== 1965 - Inshore lifeboats ===
In 1965, the RNLI re-opened the lifeboat station at Brighton, placing a fast Inshore D-class lifeboat (D-39) on service, in response to the huge increase in all forms of water activity. The Inshore boat could be launched quickly with two or three people, and didn't need a crew of seven or eight men, and multiple shore crew to help launch the boat. The boat, which cost £650, had been funded by the customers of 'The Rising Sun' public-house in London, and was kept in one of the promenade arches. It was replaced in 1970 by D-178. The Inshore station closed temporarily in 1974 due to the construction of Brighton Marina.

The station re-opened at the new Brighton Marina in 1978, where a pontoon was provided for the RNLI at the cost of £10,000. A McLachlan-class lifeboat (A-509) was placed on service until the Atlantic 21 Lions International (B-539) became fully operational in 1979.

In 1981, a permanent boathouse was constructed, and a temporary shelter was installed on the nearby quayside to house the crew facilities. This new permanent station was the RNLI's first floating lifeboat station.

The station was provided with a larger B-class (Atlantic 75) lifeboat named Thelma Glossop (B-737), arriving on the station on 1 July 1997.

=== 1999 and 2014 improvements ===
Work began on the construction of new shore facilities for the station in 1999, on the quayside within the marina. The work was completed in 2000 at a cost of £299,775.

In January 2014, the station's facilities were closed and the station moved to temporary accommodation nearby. The 2000 building was demolished as part of the £235 million re-development and expansion of the Brighton Marina.

Atlantic 75-class lifeboat Thelma Glossop (B-737) was transferred to Loch Ness in 2011, where she served for another 2 years. A new Atlantic 85-class lifeboat, Random Harvest (B-852) was placed on service on 8 September 2011.

== Station honours ==
The following are awards made at Brighton

- RNIPLS Gold Medal

Capt. Digby Marsh, RN, H.M. Coastguard, Brighton – 1840

- RNIPLS Silver Medal

Charles Watts - 1824

Lt. Edward Franklin, RN, H.M. Coastguard, Hove – 1838

Lt. George Franklyn, RN, H.M. Coastguard, Newhaven – 1839

Lt. Nathaniel Newnham, RN, H.M. Coastguard, Brighton – 1840
Lt. Thomas Henry Prior, RN, H.M. Coastguard, Brighton – 1840
Lt. James Pratt, RN, H.M. Coastguard, Brighton – 1840

- RNLI Silver Medal

Richard Pearce, Helm – 1996

- RNLI Bronze Medal

Martin Ebdell, crew member – 1996
Edward Purches, crew member – 1996

- The Maud Smith Award 1995
  (for the bravest act of lifesaving during the year by a member of a lifeboat crew)

Richard Pearce, Helm – 1996

- The Walter and Elizabeth Groombridge Award 1995
  (for the outstanding inshore lifeboat rescue of the year)

Richard Pearce, Helm – 1996
Edward Purches, crew member – 1996
Martin Ebdell, crew member – 1996

- The Walter and Elizabeth Groombridge Award 1997
  (for the outstanding inshore lifeboat rescue of the year)

Mark Smith, Helm – 1998
Mark Hayes, crew member – 1998

- The Thanks of the Institution inscribed on Vellum

Thomas Atherall, Coxswain – 1875

Alan John Young, Helm – 1986
Roger George Cohen, crew member – 1986
Stanley Todd, crew member – 1986

Mark Smith, Helm – 1997
Mark Hayes, crew member – 1997

Mark Smith, Helm – 2011

- A framed Letter of Thanks signed by the Chairman of the Institution

G. Wheeler – 1967
P. Avey – 1967
E. C. Newman – 1967

Brighton Lifeboat Station – 1996

Peter Apps, Auxiliary Coastguard – 1996
Nick Gilbert, Auxiliary Coastguard – 1996

Berenice McCall, crew member – 1997
Anthony Parsons, crew member – 1997

Marcus Morris, crew member – 2011

- Member, Order of the British Empire (MBE)

Roger George Cohen, Lifeboat Operations Manager – 2022NYH

== Roll of honour ==
In memory of those lost whilst serving Brighton lifeboat.

- Killed after falling under the lifeboat carriage wheel, during launch to the brig Atlantique, 2 June 1860

John Laker, Shore helper (43)

== Brighton lifeboats ==
=== Private lifeboats ===
| Name | Built | On service | Class | Comments |
|---|---|---|---|---|
| Unnamed | 1803 | 1809–1816 | 22-foot Greathead non-self-righting | (Note: 22-foot Greathead-class non-self-righting lifeboat, built by Henry Greathead of South Shields, costing £120 when new.) |
| Unnamed | 1837 | 1837–1854 | 28-foot Palmer Non-self-righting | (Note: 28-foot x 6-foot 9in (10-oared) Palmer-class non-self-righting lifeboat, built by Taylor of Blackwall, London, costing £70.); Operated by the Brighton Humane Society. Sold 1854 to John Wright, for continued service as a lifeboat. |
| Unnamed | 1840 | 1840–c.1874 | 22-foot Non-self-righting | (Note: 22-foot 6in x 6-foot 6in (4/6-oared) non-self-righting lifeboat, built by J. Johnston of Hove, costing £60.); Operated by Brighton Town Council. Identical at both end, with rudder fittings, allowing rowing in either direction. |
| Unnamed | – | 1854–???? | Unknown | (Note: Lifeboat of unknown specifications.); Operated by the Brighton Humane Society. |
| Unnamed | 1837 | 1854–1858 | 28-foot Palmer Non-self-righting | Operated by John Wright. |
| John Whittingham | 1878 | 1879–1932 | 28-foot Non-self-righting Whale Boat | (Note: 28-foot (8-oared) non-self-righting Whale Boat, built by White of Cowes.); Operated by Brighton Town Council. |

=== RNIPLS / RNLI lifeboats ===
==== Pulling and Sailing (P&S) lifeboats ====
| ON (Note: ON is the RNLI's Official Number of the boat.) | Name | Built | On service | Class | Comments |
|---|---|---|---|---|---|
| Pre-098 | Unnamed | 1824 | 1825–1837 | 20-foot Plenty Non-self-righting | (Note: 20-foot x 6-foot 9in Plenty-class non-self-righting lifeboat, built by William Plenty of Newbury, Berkshire, costing £100.); Transferred to St Mary's in 1837. |
Station Closed 1837–1858
| Pre-324 | Unnamed | 1858 | 1858–1867 | 30-foot Peake Self-righting (P&S) | (Note: 30-foot x 7-foot 6in (10-oared) Peake-class self-righting (P&S) lifeboat, built by Forrestt of Limehouse, London, costing £161.) |
| Pre-457 | Robert Raikes | 1866 | 1867–1874 | 33-foot Peake Self-righting (P&S) | (Note: 33-foot x 8-foot 1in (10-oared) Peake-class self-righting (P&S) lifeboat, funded from the collection by London Sunday Schools, built by Forrestt of Limehouse, London, costing £280.) |
| Pre-586 | Robert Raikes | 1874 | 1874–1888 | 32-foot Prowse Self-righting (P&S) | (Note: 32-foot x 7-foot 8in (10-oared) Prowse-class self-righting (P&S) lifeboat, funded from the collection by London Sunday Schools, built by Woolfe of Shadwell, London, costing £282.) |
| 145 | Sunlight No. 2 | 1888 | 1888–1904 | 34-foot Self-righting (P&S) | (Note: 34-foot x 7-foot 6in (10-oared) self-righting (P&S) lifeboat, gift of Lever Brothers of Warrington, built by Hansen of Cowes, costing £347.) |
| 539 | William Wallis | 1904 | 1904–1923 | 35-foot Self-righting (P&S) | (Note: 35-foot x 8-foot 6in (10-oared) self-righting (P&S) lifeboat, legacy of Mr W. Wallis of Brighton, built by Thames Ironworks of Blackwall, London, costing £827.) |
| 501 | Dash | 1902 | 1923–1924 | 35-foot Self-righting (P&S) | (Note: 35-foot x 8-foot 6in (10-oared) slf-righting (P&S), legacy of Miss M. A. Parke of London, built by Thames Ironworks of Blackwall, London, costing £822.); Reserve lifeboat No.6A, previously at Blyth. |
| 539 | William Wallis | 1904 | 1924–1931 | 35-foot Self-righting (P&S) | |

Station closed in 1931
Pre ON numbers are unofficial numbers used by the Lifeboat Enthusiast Society to reference early lifeboats not included on the official RNLI list.

==== Inshore lifeboats ====
| Op. No. (Note: Op. No. is the RNLI's Operational Number of the boat carried on the hull.) | Name | On service | Class | Comments |
|---|---|---|---|---|
| D-39 | Unnamed | 1965–1967 | D-class (RFD PB16) | |
| D-158 | Unnamed | 1968 | D-class (RFD PB16) | |
| D-178 | Unnamed | 1970–1974 | D-class (RFD PB16) | |
Station Closed 1974–1978
| A-509 | Unnamed | 1978 | A-class (McLachlan) | |
| B-539 | Lions International District 105 SE | 1978–1989 | B-class (Atlantic 21) | |
| B-577 | Graham Hillier and Tony Carter | 1989–1997 | B-class (Atlantic 21) | |
| B-737 | Thelma Glossop | 1997–2011 | B-class (Atlantic 75) | |
| B-852 | Random Harvest | 2011– | B-class (Atlantic 85) | |

== See also ==
- List of RNLI stations
- List of former RNLI stations
- Royal National Lifeboat Institution lifeboats
