= Falmouth Lifeboat Station =

RNLI lifeboat station in Cornwall, England

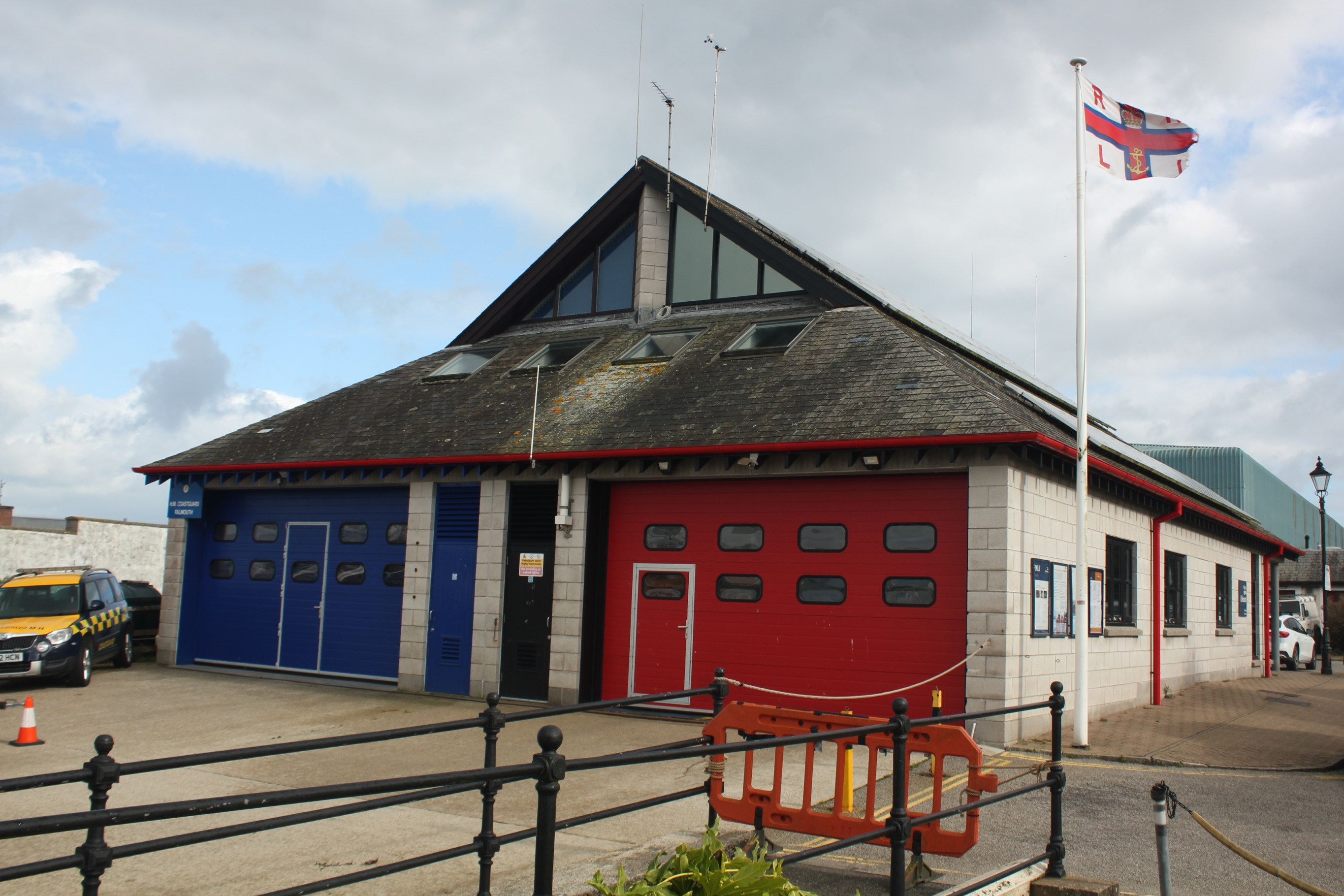
- Falmouth Lifeboat Station in 2024

- Location within Cornwall

General information
- Type: RNLI Lifeboat Station
- Location: Tinners Walk,, Port Pendennis, Falmouth, Cornwall, TR11 3XZ, United Kingdom
- Coordinates: 50.1513°N 5.0591°W
- Opened: First building 1867; Current boathouse 1993
- Owner: Royal National Lifeboat Institution

Website
- Falmouth RNLI Lifeboat Station

Falmouth Lifeboat Station can be found in a building shared with HM Coastguard in the heart of Falmouth Docks, on Tinners Lane in Falmouth, a Port town approximately 11 miles (18 km) due south of Truro, sitting on the western shore of Carrick Roads, the River Fal estuary, on the south-east coast of the county of Cornwall, England.

A lifeboat station was established at Falmouth in 1867 by the Royal National Lifeboat Institution (RNLI).

The station currently operates a Shannon-class All-weather lifeboat, 13-56 Decibel Too (ON 1363), on station since 2025, and a B-class (Atlantic 85) Inshore lifeboat, Robina Nixon Chard (B-916), on station since 2019.

== History ==
Falmouth is situated on the Carrick Roads, a large natural harbour on the south coast of Cornwall. It developed as a port for packet boats in the seventeenth century. These moved elsewhere in the 1850s but a new commercial dockyard was founded in 1860.

A committee was set up in 1865 to request the RNLI to station a lifeboat at Falmouth. A wooden lifeboat house was sanctioned and constructed near the recently constructed docks, being opened on 28 August 1867. The building cost £158 and a 10-oared lifeboat was built in London at a cost of £280. This was paid for by money raised in Gloucester and the boat had been named City of Gloucester in that city on 9 April that year. It was brought to Falmouth soon afterwards but the boathouse was not yet ready for use. Another £98 10s paid for a carriage that enabled the boat to be transported to the best launch site for any particular rescue.

In 1901 the local secretary informed the crew that their services would no longer be required after 20 April; there was concern about their conduct at launchings.

In 1918 the RNLI's lease on the land at the docks was terminated and the lifeboat was moved to moorings in the main harbour. A boarding boat was provided to enable the crew to reach their boat.

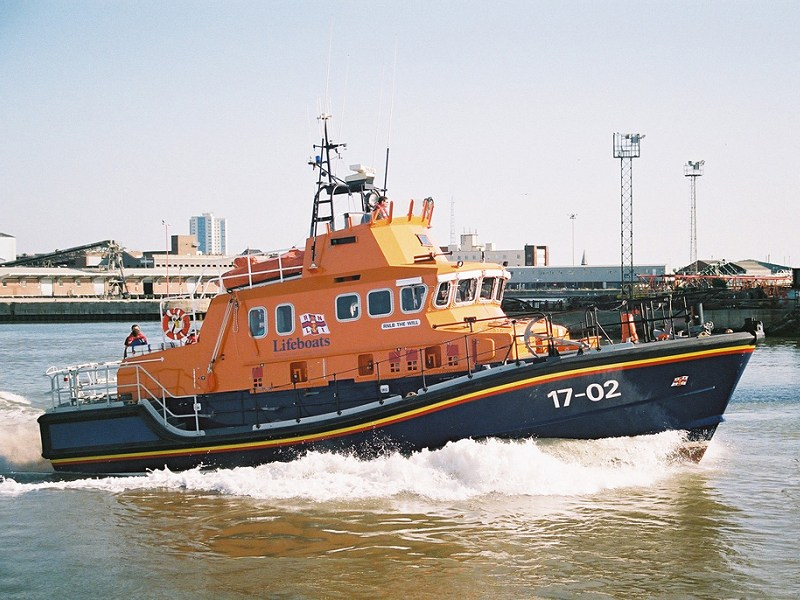
17-02 The Will

The first motor lifeboat at Falmouth was the 45-foot Watson-class The Brothers, originally stationed at Penlee Lifeboat Station, it was transferred to Falmouth on 14 April 1931. It was powered by a Weyburn 80-BHP petrol engine.

The replacement Watson-class boat, B.A.S.P. (the initials of the donors, Blackburn, Armstrong, Smart and Price) which arrived in 1934, had been the first lifeboat at Yarmouth on the Isle of Wight and the second of three Watson-class built by J Samuel White of Cowes to be stationed at Falmouth, is now preserved in the RNLI historic lifeboat collection at the Dockyard, Chatham. The third Watson was Crawford and Constance Conybeare in 1940.

The station’s last displacement hulled lifeboat, the prototype Thames class lifeboat Rotary Service, left the station in August 1976 after four years' service. It was replaced by the prototype Waveney, 44-001. This had been built in America in 1964 and was the first of the RNLI's 'fast' lifeboats, being capable of 14 knots (26 km/h), twice the speed of earlier motor lifeboats. It operated from Falmouth until June the following year. Unofficially called 'The Yank' after its American connection, 44-001 is now also preserved in the RNLI historic lifeboat collection at the Dockyard, Chatham.

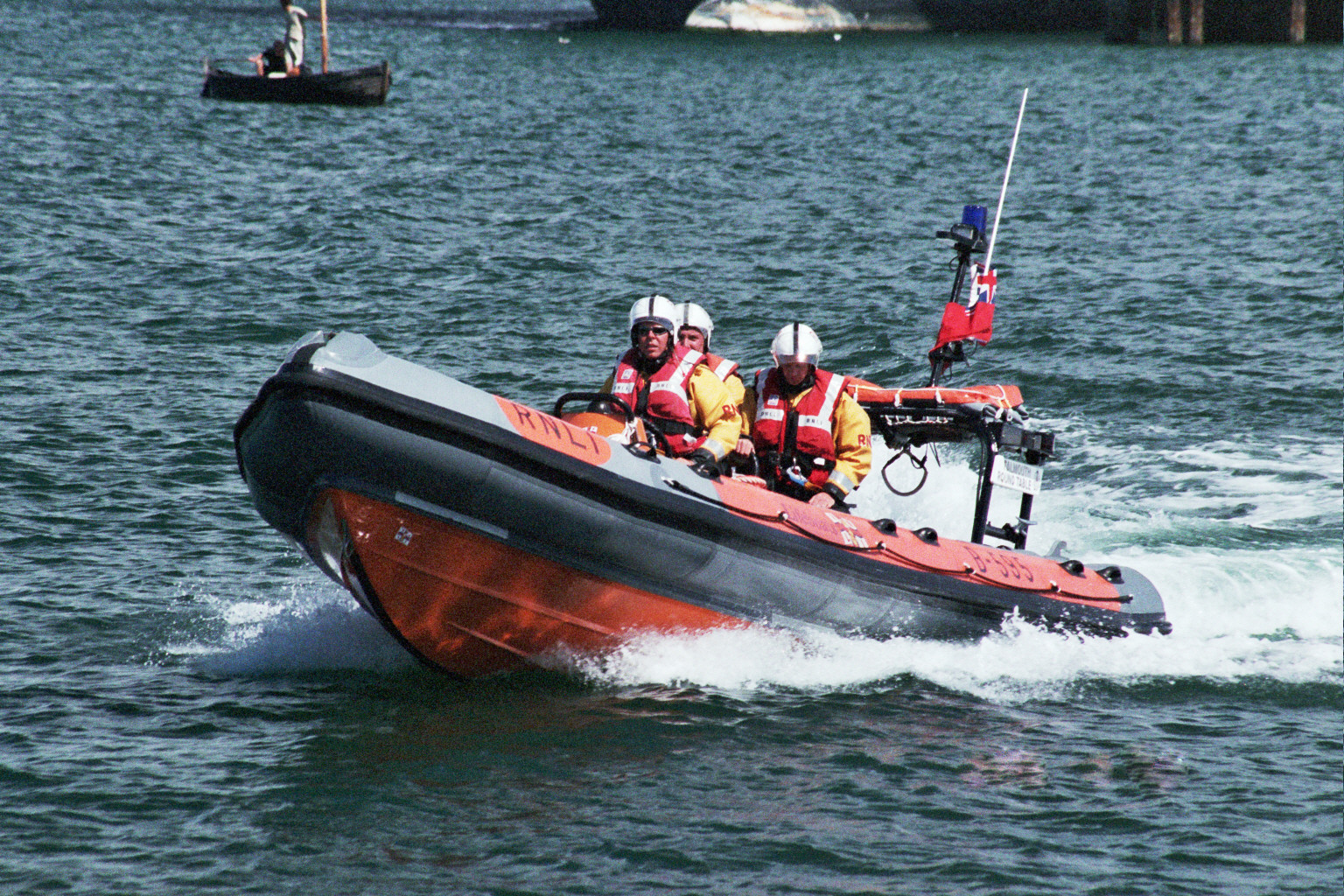
B595 Falmouth Round Table

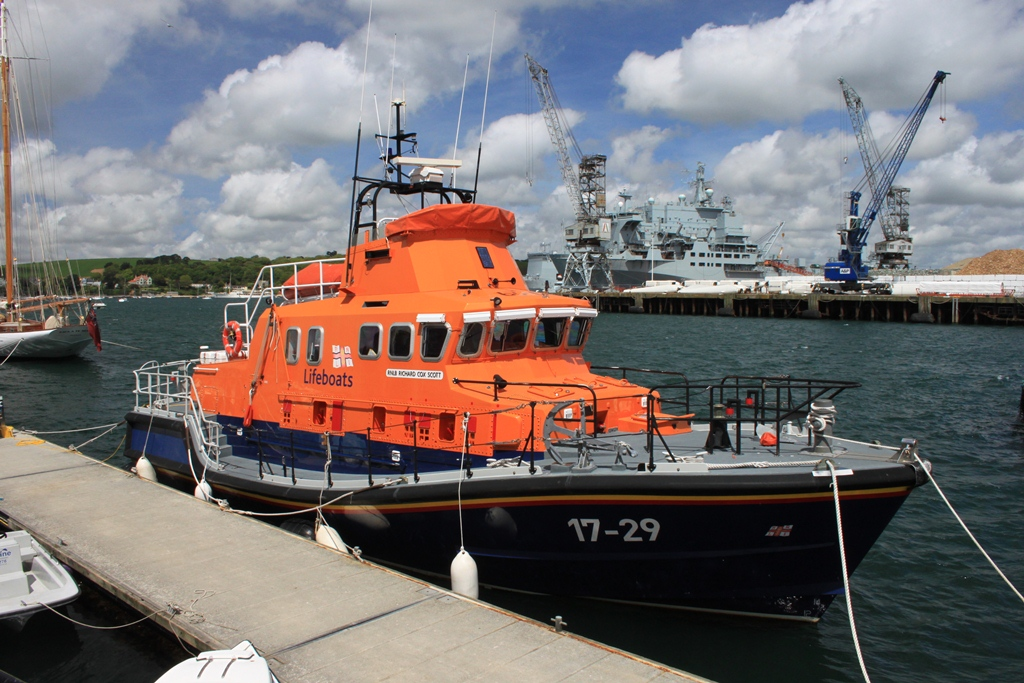
17-29 Richard Cox Scott

An experimental 20.5-foot (6.2 m) Hatch Type rigid inshore rescue boat (IRB), 18-01, was temporarily stationed at Falmouth from August to October 1967. Another early rigid ILB, an 18.5-foot (5.6 m) McLachlan, was used at Falmouth as the station's boarding boat. It proved useful for some inshore rescues, so was formally designated an ILB from 27 March 1980. It was replaced by a more conventional Atlantic 21-class rigid inflatable boat (RIB) in 1987.

Work on a new lifeboat station to house the inshore lifeboat started near the docks in July 1993; six months later it was brought into use and the hut on North Quay was vacated. The boat was kept inside, and was launched from a carriage using a specially constructed slipway. Two years later, a mooring was dredged close by to allow the all-weather boat to be moored alongside.

On station in 1997 was The Will, the first production Severn-class. It had been built in 1995 for Stornoway Lifeboat Station but had to undergo several modifications before it was fit for service. In the meantime it had been shown to many lifeboat stations where the class was expected to be deployed. It so impressed the crew at Falmouth that they asked the RNLI to station it there until their own boat was built, and so it was there from January 1997 until December 2001.

Queen Elizabeth II, Patron of the RNLI, visited the station on 1 May 2002 to name the station's latest lifeboat Richard Cox Scott.

In January 2025, the Severn-class lifeboat Richard Cox Scott was withdrawn from Falmouth. A Shannon-class lifeboat from the relief fleet, 13-44 George and Frances Phelon (ON 1351), was placed on station temporarily, whilst a new lifeboat is in production.

Falmouth's permanent Shannon-class All-weather lifeboat 13-56 Decibel Too (ON 1363) arrived on station on 27 June 2025.

== Description ==
The lifeboat station is situated in Tinners Walk close to Falmouth Docks. The building is shared with H.M. Coastguard and separate areas provide covered storage for the coastguard equipment and the RNLI inshore lifeboat. The building also houses an RNLI fund-raising shop. A slipway in front of the building is used for launching the ILB, while the all-weather boat is moored at a pontoon alongside.

== Area of operation ==
The RNLI aims to reach any casualty up to 50 miles (80 km) from its stations, and within two hours in good weather. To do this the Shannon-class lifeboat at Falmouth has an operating range of 250 nautical miles (460 km) and a top speed of 27 knots (50 km/h). Adjacent lifeboats are at Fowey Lifeboat Station to the East, and The Lizard Lifeboat Station to the West.

== Service awards ==
The National Institution for the Preservation of Life from Shipwreck (as the RNLI was known at the time) was formed in 1824. One of its objectives was to give medals for exceptional life-saving activities. Before the RNLI established a lifeboat station at Falmouth it had awarded three medals for rescues at Falmouth. William Broad had saved 11 people from a vessel aground in a gale on 7 January 1928 and naval Lieutenant William James saved 10 in similar conditions by swimming through the surf with a rope on 6 December 1830. Both of these merited gold medals, while on 14 February 1838 Lieutenant William Field rescued two people from a barge.

The RNLI's lifeboat was on station from 1867 and launched many times but it was other boats that raced to the aid of the Marys when it was wrecked at the harbour entrance on 22 October 1880. George Hatch, mate of the Berkshire used his ship's lifeboat to rescue 2 people and Captain Richard Sherris, the harbourmaster, used his steam launch to rescue a third. Hatch was awarded a silver medal and Sherris received the 'Thanks of the Institution inscribed on vellum'.

The lifeboat Bob Newbon was launched on the morning of 3 November 1916 after a military tanker, the RFA Ponus, had gone aground on Gyllyngvase beach. The ship's crew declined help so the lifeboat returned to station, only to be called back. This time 19 crew were taken off the ground ship and landed. One person was left aboard to look after the Ponis but a fire broke out so the lifeboat was sailed around to Gyllyngvase for a third time. The crew member who had been left on board jumped overboard but was unable to swim to shore. Two of his crewmates, Frank Stephens and E Badger, rowed out in a dinghy and towed him to safety. For this bravery they were both awarded RNLI silver medals.

On 19 January 1940, the lifeboat Crawford and Constance Conybeare put to sea, just six days after being christened. The SS Kirkpool of West Hartlepool was dragging its anchors in a gale. The lifeboat managed to pass a line between the ship and a tug but this was not able to prevent it running aground, which caused a serious injury to a seaman in the engine room. He and 13 colleagues were taken off by the lifeboat and landed in Falmouth. The lifeboat then returned to the grounded ship and managed to rescue the remaining 21 crew members. Lifeboat Coxswain John Snell was awarded an RNLI silver medal for his outstanding seamanship and great courage, and his Motor Mechanic, Charles Williams, received a Bronze Medal for his gallantry.

Falmouth's boarding boat was used to effect a rescue on 4 September 1967. The Martine Jean Paul, a French fishing boat, had run aground at Trefusis Point. Their location and poor sea conditions would have made for difficult approach for the large lifeboat but the smaller motorboat managed to get in. The RNLI crew, Coxswain Bert West, Ronald Twydle and Cyril Barnicot, secured the trawler to a buoy and stood by until it was refloated three hours later. The RNLI crew were given 'Framed letters of thanks' from the institution's chairman.

The relief lifeboat Princess Royal (Civil Service No.7) was called out twice on the evening of 7 August 1972. It returned to its moorings at a quarter past midnight. Four hours later it was called out again to a small boat carrying ten people that had a damaged rudder and was at the mercy of a Force 9 severe gale. The lifeboat stood by waiting for a tug to arrive, but the boat lost its anchor so more positive action was needed. Despite the 10 ft (3.0 m) waves the lifeboat managed to take off eight people, leaving just two on board to crew the boat. The tug eventually arrived and took the boat in tow into Falmouth; the lifeboat returned to its moorings at half past three in the afternoon. Coxswain Walter Brown was awarded a bronze medal for his skill and courage.

The Rotary Service put to sea in the evening of 28 November 1977 to help a crew of six on a barge that was being towed in heavy seas 8 mi (13 km) off The Lizard. The barge was 110 ft (34 m) long, 70 ft (21 m) wide, and had four legs which rose 70 ft (21 m) above the deck. Five men managed to jump onto the lifeboat, but the sixth narrowly missed being crushed between the lifeboat and the rolling barge. Coxswain Arthur West was awarded a bronze medal for his outstanding seamanship and tremendous courage.

An unexpected storm, gusting up to hurricane force 12, blew up in the Western Approaches on 13 August 1979 during the Fastnet Race while 303 yachts were at sea. Falmouth's new Arun-class lifeboat put to sea on one fruitless search that evening but soon after returning to its station it was asked to join lifeboats from 12 other stations in a major operation to rescue crews. It took up a search area to the west of the Isles of Scilly eight hours after leaving its moorings. After 32 hours the crew were given a break at Newlyn. It finally returned home just after midnight, in the early hours of 16 August. In common with the other stations involved, Falmouth received a special framed certificate from Duke of Atholl, the chairman of the RNLI. Among the yachts assisted was the Drum which capsized when it lost its keel.

A Force 11 violent storm was blowing in the early hours of on 15 February 1985 in which the French fishing vessel St Simeon was sinking, 28 nmi (52 km) south of Falmouth. The RNLB Elizabeth Ann was sent to the rescue. It left its mooring at 03:50 but could not make full speed through the storm so it was 07:00 before it reached the ship which was still pumping out water. After standing by for 2 hours, the French ship managed to restart its engines so the lifeboat escorted it towards safety. The Penlee lifeboat came to take over and the Falmouth boat returned home. The casualty was heading towards Plymouth with the Penlee boat which was relieved by that from Plymouth but the pumping failed and it was abandoned and sank. The three lifeboat coxswains, including Vivian Pentecost from Falmouth, all received the 'Thanks of the Institution inscribed on vellum'. Two years later Pentecost was working on his own boat when a nearby dinghy capsized. He was presented with the chairman's 'Framed letter of thanks' for getting four people out of the water into his boat before transferring them to the Falmouth inshore lifeboat.

The Elizabeth Ann went out to a catamaran that was in difficulties on 26 November 1995. It managed to tow it back to safety at Falmouth in difficult weather conditions. The coxswain, Peter Woods, was presented with a 'Thanks of the Institution inscribed on vellum', as was crew member Peter Woods who had transferred to the catamaran to help its own crew.

The Will was called out twice on 22 August 1999. After giving a yacht a town into port, it went out to aid the tug Dido which was drifting without steering in heavy seas near the Manacles. A tow line was established but the casualty was very close to the rocks and the lifeboat was forced to find a safe route back to open water between rocks that would be difficult in calm weather. Coxswain Alan Barnes was presented with a 'Framed letter of thanks' for his seamanship and courage that day. He was made a Member of the Order of the British Empire (MBE) in 2005.

The inshore lifeboat aided two girls who were stuck on a cliff. Crew members Mark Pollard and Marc Thomas climbed the cliff to help them until a coastguard cliff rescue team could take them up to safety. The two RNLI men were presented with 'Framed letters of thanks' signed by the chairman. Mark Pollard, as coxswain of the all-weather lifeboat, was awarded a bronze medal for saving the MV Galina with its crew of 8 in a storm on 2 November 2005. His outstanding seamanship was recognised on this occasion by winning the Lady Swathling Trophy of the Shipwrecked Fishermen and Mariners Royal Benevolent Society.

== Roll of honour ==
In memory of those lost whilst serving Falmouth lifeboat:

- Killed in a World War II air raid on 13 May 1941
  Thomas J. Pratt, Travelling mechanic (64)

== Falmouth lifeboats ==
=== Pulling and sailing lifeboats ===
| On station | ON (Note: ON is the RNLI's Official Number of the boat.) | Name | Built | Class | Comments |
|---|---|---|---|---|---|
| 1867–1887 | Pre-484 | City of Gloucester (The Gloucester) | 1867 | 33-foot Peake Self-righting (P&S) | (Note: 33 ft 0 in (10.06 m) x 8 ft 6 in (2.59 m) (10-oared) self-righting (P&S) lifeboat, gift of the City of Gloucester LB fund, built by Forrestt of Limehouse, London, costing £280.); Broken up in 1887. |
| 1887–1894 | 118 | Jane Whittingham | 1887 | 34-foot Self-righting (P&S) | (Note: 34 ft 0 in (10.36 m) x 8 ft 0 in (2.44 m) (10-oared) self-righting (P&S) lifeboat, legacy of Mr J. P. Whittingham of London, built by Woolfe of Shadwell, London, costing £392.); Sold in 1894. |
| 1894–1922 | 372 | Bob Newbon | 1894 | 37-foot Self-righting (P&S) | (Note: 37 ft 0 in (11.28 m) x 9 ft 0 in (2.74 m) (12-oared) self-righting (P&S) lifeboat, legacy of Mr R. A. Newbon of Islington, built by Forrestt of Limehouse, London, costing £541.); Sold locally in 1924. |
| 1922–1928 | 417 | Jane Anne | 1898 | 37-foot Self-righting (P&S) | (Note: 37 ft 0 in (11.28 m) x 9 ft 3 in (2.82 m) (10-oared) self-righting (P&S) lifeboat, legacy of Mr G. P. Nicholls of Southcote, Middlesex, built by Thames Ironworks of Blackwall, London, costing £681 when new.); Previously at Irvine. Sold at auction in 1928. Discovered in a field in Somerset in the 1980s, and now on display as found at the Scottish Maritime Museum, Irvine |
| 1928–1931 | 664 | Herbert Sturmy | 1918 | 37-foot Self-righting (P&S) | (Note: 37 ft 0 in (11.28 m) x 9 ft 3 in (2.82 m) (12-oared) self-righting (P&S) lifeboat, legacy of Mr H. Sturmy of Blackheath, London, built by Summers and Payne of Southampton, completed by Saunders of Cowes, costing £2,800 when new.); Previously at Swanage. Transferred to Cadgwith. |

Pre ON numbers are unofficial numbers used by the Lifeboat Enthusiasts' Society to reference early lifeboats not included on the official RNLI list.

=== Motor lifeboats ===
| On station | ON | Op.No. (Note: Op.No. is the RNLI's Operational Number of the boat carried on the hull.) | Name | Built | Class | Comments |
|---|---|---|---|---|---|---|
| 1931–1934 | 671 | – | The Brothers | 1922 | 45-foot Watson | Transferred to the relief fleet, later at Selsey. |
| 1934–1940 | 687 | — | B. A. S. P. | 1924 | 45-foot Watson | Preserved in the RNLI Heritage Collection at Chatham Historic Dockyard. |
| 1940–1968 | 829 | — | Crawford and Constance Conybeare | 1939 | 46-foot Watson | Sold 1974, Renamed Three Seas, later Bilitis. Last reported as Connie in Singapore, January 1997. |
| 1968–1974 | 928 | — | Lilla Marras, Douglas and Will | 1955 | 46-foot 9in Watson | Transferred to the relief fleet, later at Donaghadee. |
| 1974–1978 | 1031 | 50-001 | Rotary Service | 1973 | Thames | Transferred to Dover |
| 1978–1979 | — | 44-001 | Unnamed {The Yank) | 1964 | Waveney | Prototype Waveney-class lifeboat. Preserved in the RNLI Heritage Collection at Chatham Historic Dockyard. |
| 1979–1997 | 1058 | 52-11 | Elizabeth Ann | 1979 | Arun | 1997-2001, relief fleet. 2003, sold to Australia's RVCP. In private ownership at Hope Cove, Queensland, November 2024. |
| 1997–2001 | 1201 | 17-02 | The Will | 1995 | Severn | Underwent Severn Life Extension Programme (SLEP). Renamed and renumbered 17-51 "Ettrick Shepherd" Hogg Hardie. |
| 2001–2025 | 1256 | 17-29 | Richard Cox Scott | 2001 | Severn | Withdrawn from service in 2025. |
| 2025 | 1351 | 13-44 | George and Frances Phelon | 2022 | Shannon | Temporary duty from the relief fleet. Now on service at Great Yarmouth and Gorleston |
| 2025– | 1363 | 13-56 | Decibel Too | 2025 | Shannon | |

More post-service details can be found on the respective lifeboat class pages.

=== Inshore lifeboats ===
==== A-class ====
| On station | Op.No. | Name | Class | Comments |
|---|---|---|---|---|
| 1967 | 18-01 | Unnamed | A-class (Hatch) | On station for evaluation trials. Later renumbered A-1. |
| 1973–1980 | A-503 | Unnamed | A-class (McLachlan) | Prototype boat with wooden hull. Previously numbered 18-02. |
| 1980–1988 | A-508 | Unnamed | A-class (McLachlan) | GPC-hulled boarding boat. Previously numbered 18-008. |
| 1988 | A-512 | Unnamed | A-class (McLachlan) | |

==== B-class ====
| On station | Op.No. | Name | Class | Comments |
|---|---|---|---|---|
| 1987–1988 | B-518 | Sole Bay | B-class (Atlantic 21) | |
| 1988–1991 | B-541 | Elizabeth Bestwick | B-class (Atlantic 21) | |
| 1991–1993 | B-529 | Alexander Duckham | B-class (Atlantic 21) | |
| 1993 | B-555 | Long Life I | B-class (Atlantic 21) | |
| 1993–1994 | B-541 | Elizabeth Bestwick | B-class (Atlantic 21) | |
| 1994–2007 | B-595 | Falmouth Round Table | B-class (Atlantic 21) | |
| 2007–2019 | B-756 | Eve Pank | B-class (Atlantic 75) | |
| 2019– | B-916 | Robina Nixon Chard | B-class (Atlantic 85) | |

== See also ==
- List of RNLI stations
- List of former RNLI stations
- Royal National Lifeboat Institution lifeboats
