= McLachlan-class lifeboat =

Inshore lifeboat class of the RNLI

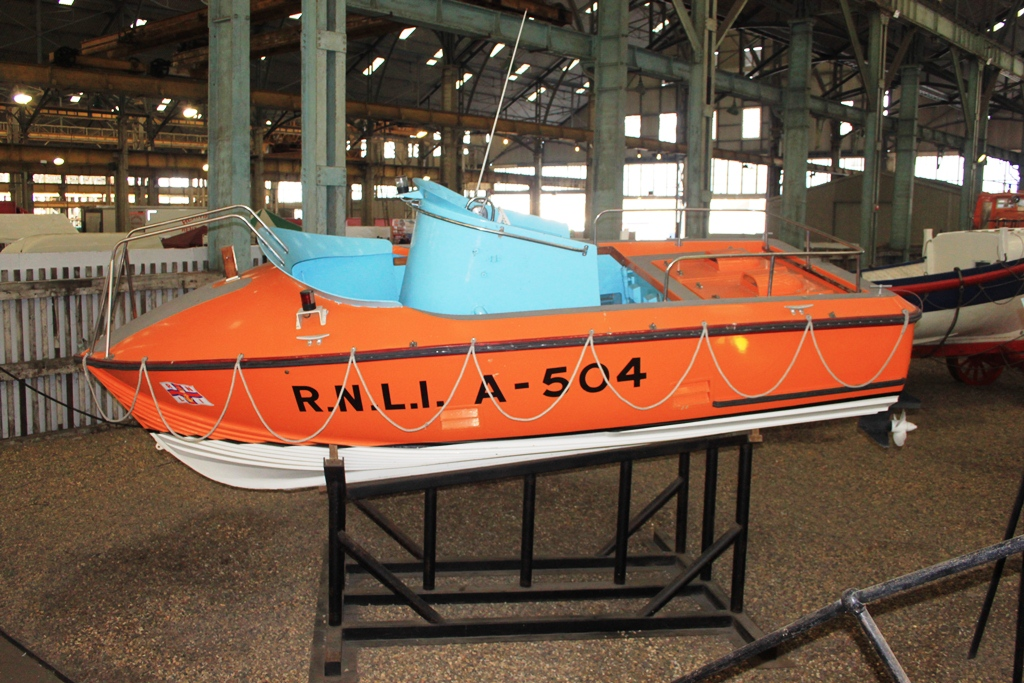
- A-504 in the RNLI Heritage Collection at Chatham Historic Dockyard

Class overview
- Name: McLachlan class
- Builders: William Osborne, Littlehampton
- Operators: Royal National Lifeboat Institution
- Preceded by: Hatch
- Succeeded by: Atlantic 21
- Built: 1967–1973
- In service: 1967–1988
- Completed: 10
- Retired: 10
- Preserved: 1

General characteristics
- Length: 18 ft 6 in (5.64 m)
- Beam: 8 ft 3 in (2.51 m)
- Propulsion: 2 x 60 hp inboard engines with sterndrives
- Speed: 22 knots (25 mph; 41 km/h)
- Complement: 2-3

The McLachlan-class lifeboat was one of a group of rigid-hull Inshore lifeboats, developed after the success of the smaller D-class Inshore lifeboats, operated by the Royal National Lifeboat Institution (RNLI) of the United Kingdom and Ireland. The lifeboats, re-designated as A-class lifeboats in 1972, operated from 1967 to 1988.

== History ==
Following the success of the introduction of small fast D-class (RFD PB16) Inshore lifeboats in 1963, it was quickly seen that a larger class of Inshore boat would bridge the gap between the smaller D-class, and the standard All-weather lifeboats. These boats would have a rigid hull, capable of being moored afloat, and offering the option of being a boarding boat, but still be fast, and easy to launch. The first of these was the Hatch-class lifeboat in 1966.

The McLachlan-class lifeboat was the second type of the rigid-hull fast Inshore lifeboats in service with the RNLI from the 1960s. It was designed by J. Allen McLachlan MRINA, a naval architect, former RNLI chief draughtsman and partner at longtime yacht and lifeboat designers G. L. Watson & Co. of Glasgow.

The first trial boat, numbered 18-02 by the RNLI, was built by W. A. Souter of Cowes. The boat was constructed from three layers of mahogany with foam-filled watertight compartments, and was noted by its use of a 'ragged chine hull', with nine chines that cushioned the hull and reduced pounding. The helm was in a standing position, in a sunken bridge deck, with a weathershield in front of the controls. A 90-hp Evinrude engine gave a speed of 20.9 knots.

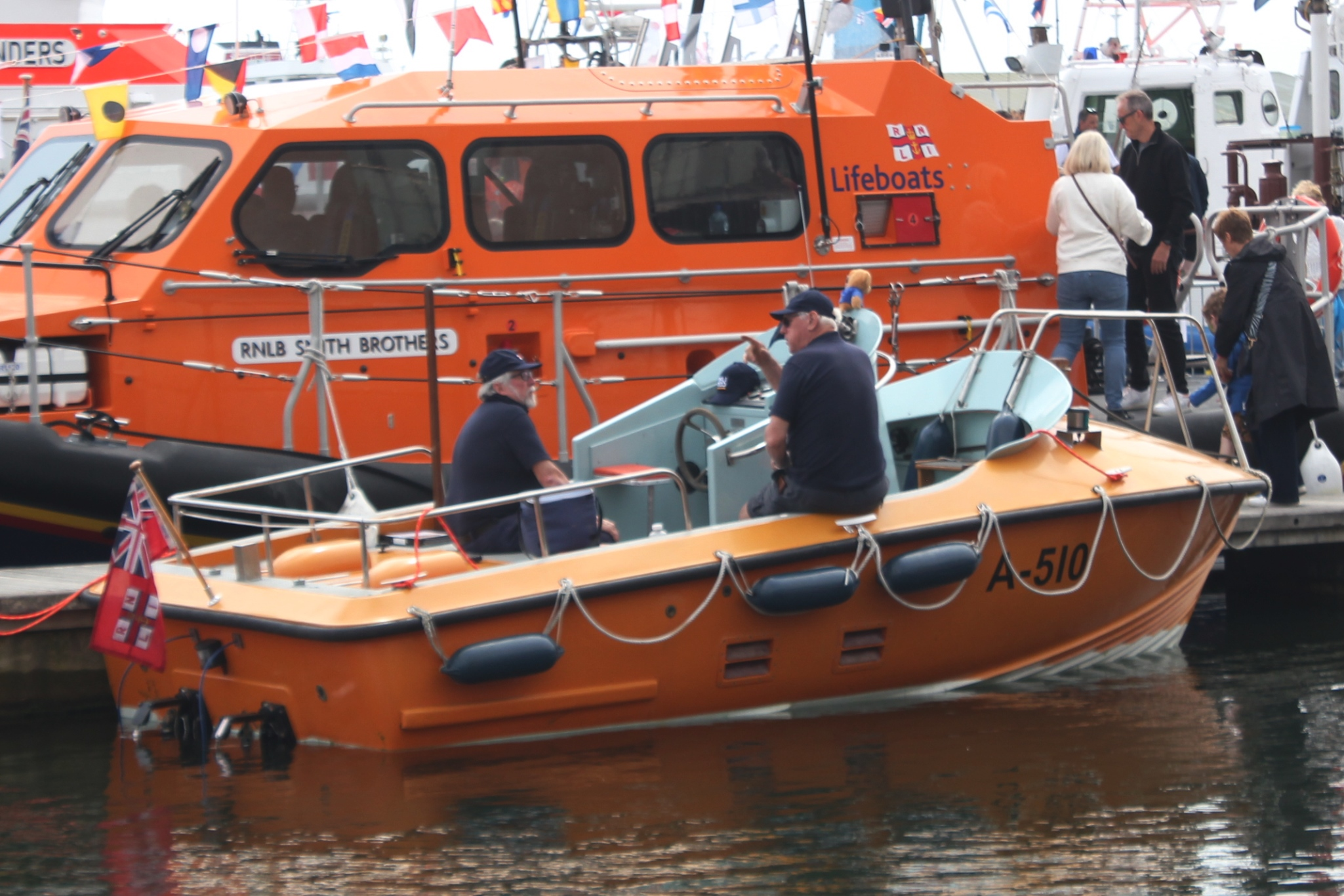
Restored A-510 at the RNLI 200 event, Poole, 2024

In September 1969, following successful trials, the RNLI placed an order for four boats with boatbuilder William Osbourne of Littlehampton, to be constructed with GRP hulls, fitted with twin sterndrive Ford 60-hp marinised petrol engines, and each costing £3,400. 18-02 would later be fitted with twin 47-hp Perkins diesel engines. William Osborne built a further five McLachlan lifeboats in the 1970s.

Most McLachlan-class boats remained afloat, but two were kept on carriages, one at Weston-super-Mare, being launched down a long slipway, and one at Peel, IOM, was launched with the aid of a tractor.

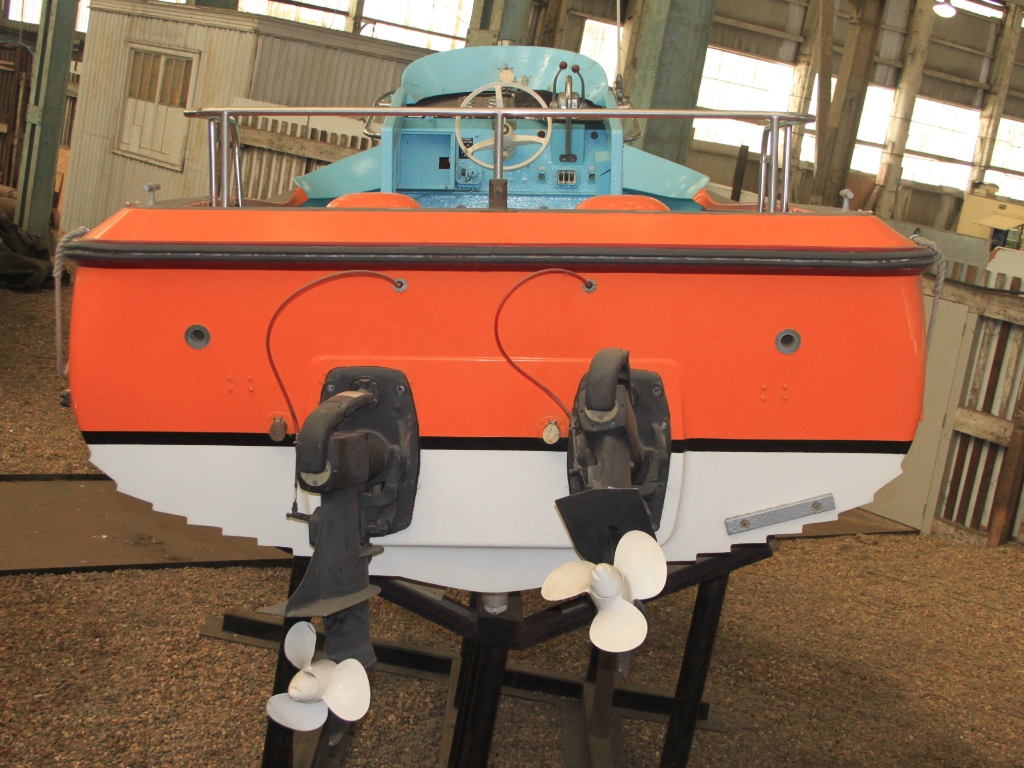
McLachlan lifeboat stern view

In 1972, it was decided to reclassify the 17 and 18-foot boats from Offshore to Inshore A-class lifeboats, and their numbers were changed according; 18-02 becoming A-503, up to 18-008 becoming A-508.

Although not classed as lifeboats, two further McLachlan designed boats were constructed for use as Boarding boats at Humber Lifeboat Station, (BB-239) and (BB-240). All the McLachlan lifeboats had been retired by the late 1980s, with the exception of the prototype boat, which went on to be a boarding boat at Humber until 1994.

== Notable service ==
At 22:30 on 13 September 1975, Weston-super-Mare lifeboat A-504 (formerly 18-004) was launched into an easterly gale, to a motor-boat wrecked on the rocks, at the foot of a sheer cliff, on the north side of Brean Down promentory. Five men were now standing on a rocky ledge, at danger of being swept into the rising tide. Bringing the lifeboat as close as possible, despite grounding several times, a line was thrown, and with one man wading out to the boat, the other four were hauled through the water to the lifeboat. Helm Julian Morris was awarded the RNLI Bronze Medal, with crew members Bernard Watts and Ian Watts both accorded the Thanks of the Institution inscribed on Vellum. The boat is now on display in the RNLI Heritage Collection at Chatham Historic Dockyard.

== McLachlan lifeboat fleet ==
All of the following fleet details are referenced to the 2026 Lifeboat Enthusiasts' Society Handbook, with information retrieved directly from RNLI records.

Old Op. No.	Op. No. (Note: Op. No. is the RNLI's Operational Number of the boat carried on the hull.)	Built	In service	Station	Comments
18-02	A-503	1967	1967–1970	Eastney	Prototype. After service details unknown.
18-02	A-503	1967	1971	Poole	Prototype. After service details unknown.
18-02	A-503	1967	1971	Weston-super-Mare	Prototype. After service details unknown.
18-02	A-503	1967	1971–1972	Pill	Prototype. After service details unknown.
18-02	A-503	1967	1973–1980	Falmouth	Prototype. After service details unknown.
18-02	A-503	1967	1980–1994	Humber Boarding Boat	Prototype. After service details unknown.
18-004	A-504	1970	1970–1983	Weston-super-Mare	On display in the RNLI Heritage Collection at Chatham Historic Dockyard.
18-005	A-505	1970	1970–1971	Eastney	Sold in 1988. Last reported undergoing restoration at RW Davies, Saul Junction Marina, 2018.
18-005	A-505	1970	1972–1973	Oban	Sold in 1988. Last reported undergoing restoration at RW Davies, Saul Junction Marina, 2018.
18-005	A-505	1970	1974–1975	Eastney	Sold in 1988. Last reported undergoing restoration at RW Davies, Saul Junction Marina, 2018.
18-005	A-505	1970	1977–1987	Humber (Boarding boat)	Sold in 1988. Last reported undergoing restoration at RW Davies, Saul Junction Marina, 2018.
18-006	A-506	1971	1972–1973	Peel	Last reported as transferred to the Bristol Lifeboat Museum (now closed) in 1980.
18-006	A-506	1971	1972–1979	Relief fleet	Last reported as transferred to the Bristol Lifeboat Museum (now closed) in 1980.
18-006	A-506	1971	1979–1980	Plymouth	Last reported as transferred to the Bristol Lifeboat Museum (now closed) in 1980.
18-007	A-507	1971	1972–1973	Weston-super-Mare	Sold in 1989. Undergoing Restoration at Exmouth, Devon, 2024.
18-007	A-507	1971	1973–1976	Peel	Sold in 1989. Undergoing Restoration at Exmouth, Devon, 2024.
18-007	A-507	1971	1977–1983	Plymouth	Sold in 1989. Undergoing Restoration at Exmouth, Devon, 2024.
18-008	A-508	1971	1971–1974	Eastney	Sold in 1988.
18-008	A-508	1971	1976–1979	Invergordon	Sold in 1988.
18-008	A-508	1971	1980–1988	Falmouth	Sold in 1988.
–	A-509	1972	1972–1976	Plymouth	Sold in June 1988.
–	A-509	1972	1978	Brighton	Sold in June 1988.
–	A-509	1972	1978–1988	Relief fleet	Sold in June 1988.
–	A-510	1973	1973–1974	Pill	Sold in 1989. Private ownership, Bristol, August 2020. Restored in original livery, on display at RNLI 200 event in Poole in 2024. New ownership in Kinsale, Ireland, August 2024.
–	A-510	1973	1975–1984	Ramsgate	Sold in 1989. Private ownership, Bristol, August 2020. Restored in original livery, on display at RNLI 200 event in Poole in 2024. New ownership in Kinsale, Ireland, August 2024.
–	A-510	1973	1984–1987	(Boarding Boat)	Sold in 1989. Private ownership, Bristol, August 2020. Restored in original livery, on display at RNLI 200 event in Poole in 2024. New ownership in Kinsale, Ireland, August 2024.
–	A-511	1973	1973–1982	Oban	Sold in 1985. Renamed Kim O. For sale at Stokesley, N. Yorks. (eBay), December 2023.
–	A-511	1973	1984–1985	Relief fleet	Sold in 1985. Renamed Kim O. For sale at Stokesley, N. Yorks. (eBay), December 2023.
–	A-512	1974	1975–1987	Torbay	Scrapped in 1988.
–	A-512	1974	1988	Falmouth	Scrapped in 1988.

== See also ==
- List of RNLI stations
- List of former RNLI stations
- Royal National Lifeboat Institution lifeboats
