= Plymouth Lifeboat Station =

RNLI lifeboat station in Devon, England

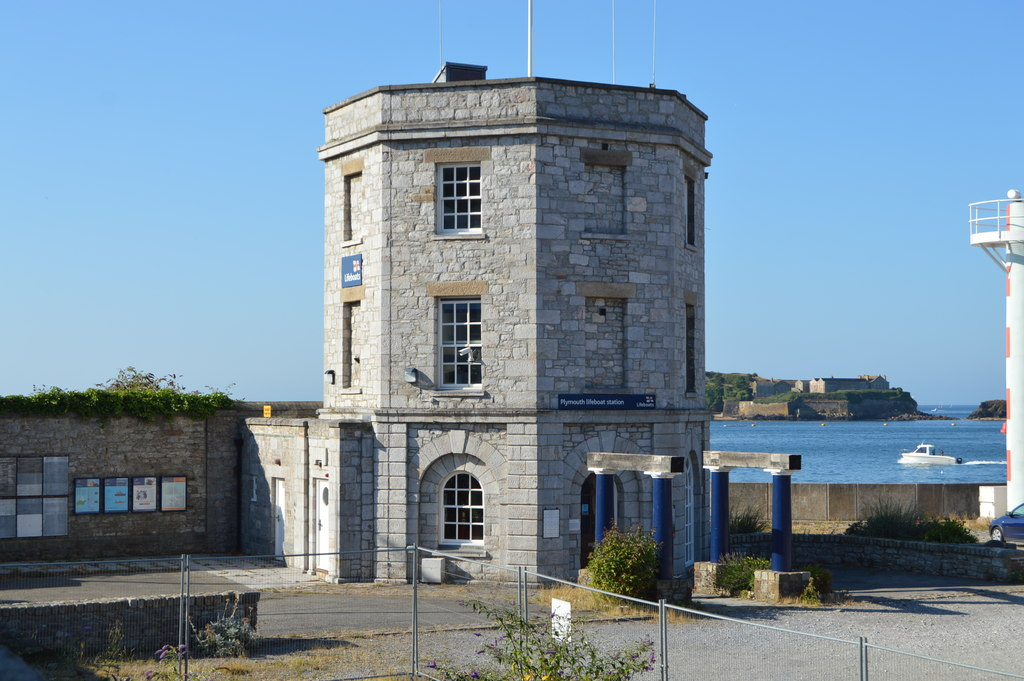
- Plymouth Lifeboat Station

- Location within Devon

General information
- Type: Lifeboat station
- Location: Old Custom House, Custom House Lane, Plymouth, Devon, PL1 3EQ, England
- Coordinates: 50.36301°N 4.15038°W
- Current tenants: Royal National Lifeboat Institution
- Completed: 1850 (as customs office)

Design and construction
- Architect: George Wightwick

Website
- Plymouth RNLI Lifeboat Station

Listed Building – Grade II
- Feature: Former customs office
- Designated: 30 April 1975
- Reference no.: 1113301

Plymouth Lifeboat Station is housed in the Old Custom House, a Grade II-listed three-storey tower on Custom House Lane in Plymouth, a Port city on the east bank of the River Tamar estuary, on the south-east coast of the county of Devon, England.

The first lifeboat was stationed in the city in 1803. A station was re-established by the Royal National Institution for the Preservation of Life from Shipwreck (RNIPLS) in 1825, operating until 1840. In 1862, the station was re-established again, by the Royal National Lifeboat Institution (RNLI).

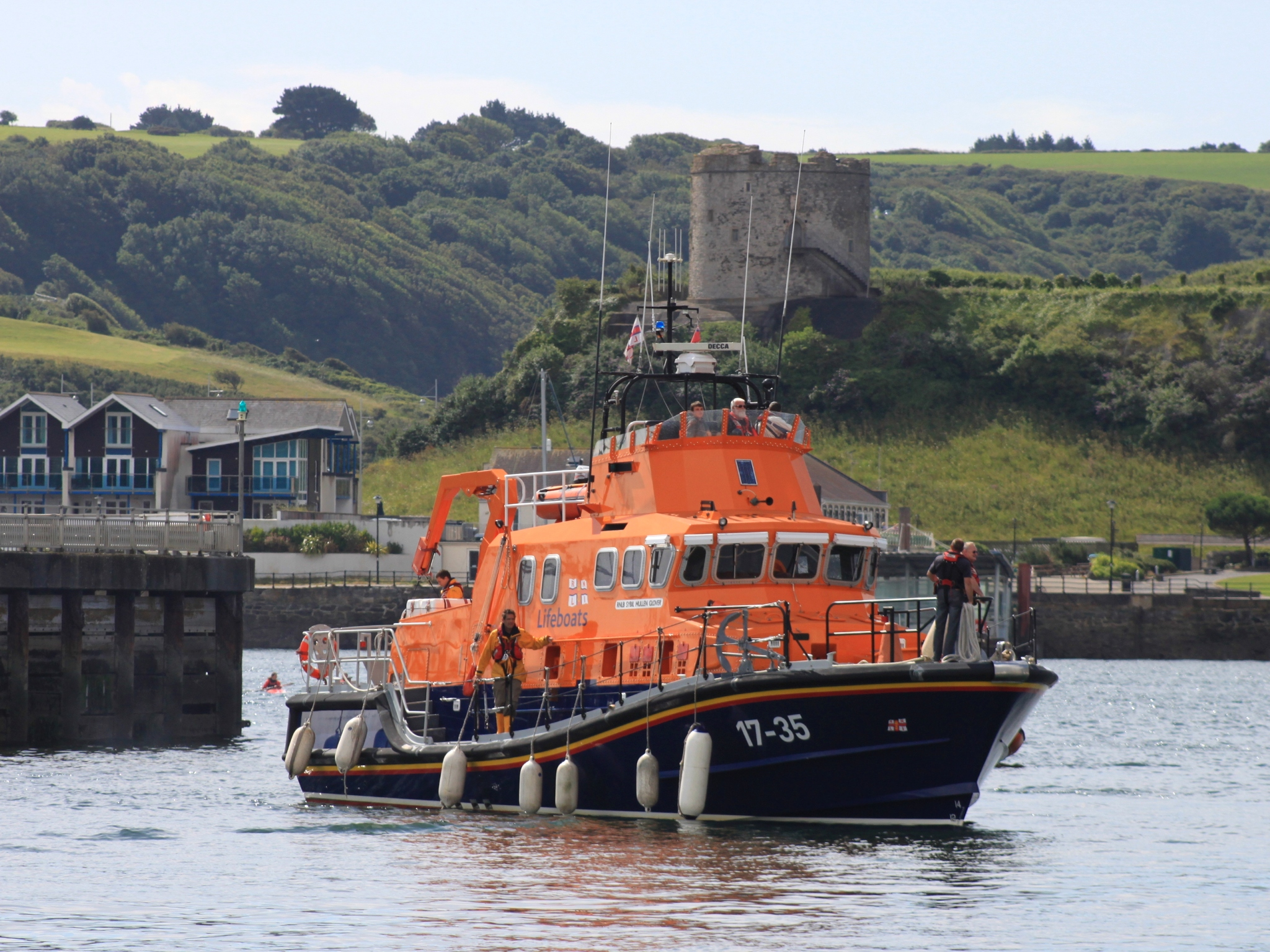
Severn-class All-weather lifeboat 17-35 Sybil Mullen Glover (ON 1264)

The station currently operates a Severn-class All-weather lifeboat, 17-35 Sybil Mullen Glover (ON 1264), on station since 2003, and a B-class (Atlantic 85) Inshore lifeboat, Annabel E Jones (B-908), on station since 2018.

== History ==
In 1803, a lifeboat built by Henry Greathead of South Shields was provided to Plymouth, funded by the MP for Plymouth (constituency), and former mayor Philip Langmead, along with a contribution from Lloyd's of London. No record of any service has been found, and by 1825, there was no evidence that it still existed.

A new lifeboat was provided in 1825 by the Royal National Institution for the Preservation of Life from Shipwreck (RNIPLS) (renamed the Royal National Lifeboat Institution in 1854). The station was established across the Tamar estuary, near the coastguard station at Cawsand, on the Rame peninsula, in Cornwall. Again, no records of service have been found, and in 1840, the lifeboat was transferred to St Mary's in the Isles of Scilly.

=== Gallantry ===
Even if no lifeboat was used, there was no shortage of gallantry shown around the local coast. Between 1825 and 1843, no fewer than 14 Silver medals were awarded by the RNIPLS. Established in 1824, one of its objectives was that "medallions or pecuniary awards be given to those who rescue lives in cases of shipwreck".

Three Silver medals were earned at Plymouth in 1825, all as the result of a single storm on 23 November. Coastguard James Craggs saved a woman from the John (although her husband and his crew all drowned), Coastguard John Miller saved seven of the 13 crew of the Harmonie, and Richard Eddy, a local ship's pilot, saved four from the Coromandel. Richard Eddy was subsequently awarded a second and third silver medal, after saving 10 people from the Koningsberg when it ran aground on 13 January 1834.

Coastguard John Woolland Bake was awarded a silver medal, for saving 25 people from the Mary Ann, when it was wrecked in Bovisand Bay on 13 January 1828. Three Royal Navy sailors, Francis Strong, Thomas Huss and Augustus May, received silver medals for saving the 10 crew members of the Erin, which struck Plymouth breakwater during a storm on 20 February 1833, and Lieutenant Adrian Thomas Mann was similarly rewarded for saving six on 26 April 1833 – two from a barge, and four other 'rescuers', who had themselves capsized.

The breakwater was the scene of another rescue on 14 February 1838. Lieutenant Thomas Holman saved the six people on the Thetis and was awarded a silver medal. Revenue Cutters were involved in two silver-medal rescues during the following winter. J. S. W. Grandy, mate of the Harpy, saved five people on 28 November 1838 and Andrew Gillespie, gunner on the Stork, saved four on 23 March 1839. The final silver medal awarded before the lifeboat station was established at Millbay, was to Lieutenant John Cornish, for rescuing two men from the schooner Norman, when it ran aground 22 October 1843.

=== RNLI from 1862 ===
At a meeting of the RNLI committee of management on Thursday 5 December 1861, the report of the visit to Plymouth by the Inspector of Lifeboats was read and approved. On 21 February 1862, a 34-foot-long (10 m) Peake-class self-righting 'Pulling and Sailing' (P&S) lifeboat, one with sails and oars, built by Forrestt of Limehouse, London, and costing £180, was transported by express goods train to Plymouth, free of charge, by the Great Western, Bristol and Exeter, and South Devon Railway Companies.

The inauguration took place on 24–25 February, during which the boat was drawn through the street in grand procession. It was said that "Nearly the whole of the large population of the adjoining towns of Plymouth, Devonport, and Stonehouse, and of their neighbourhood, being assembled in the streets to welcome and do honour to the first Plymouth life-boat." A boat-house was constructed on the West Wharf of the outer basin of Millbay Docks, at a cost of £159. Monies raised by annual subscription provided future security of the establishment, with the initial cost of the lifeboat provided by the gift of £240 from heiress Angela Burdett-Coutts, 1st Baroness Burdett-Coutts, and in accordance with her wishes, the lifeboat was named Prince Consort.

At a meeting of the committee of management on Thursday 5 February 1880, it was decided that a new boathouse and slipway be constructed at Plymouth. This was brought about due to the extension of the railway along the docks. The boathouse, costing £325, was constructed at the seaward end of the wharf at The Camber, with a 130-foot (40 m) launching slip. A contribution of £250 was received from Great Western Railway.

- Coord:50°21′45.3″N 4°09′22.3″W

Further construction work on the boathouse, costing £427-10s, was carried out in 1897/98, coinciding with the arrival of a new 37 ft 0 in (11.28 m) self-righting lifeboat, Eliza Avins (ON 412).

=== Motor power ===
The first motor-powered lifeboats started appearing in the late 1900s, but it was only in 1926 when Plymouth received one. Its arrival brought about a significant change, in that due to the size of the new boat, the lifeboat would need to be moored afloat, and this has been the case for every All-weather lifeboat at Plymouth ever since. The new boat was the Robert and Marcella Beck (ON 696), a 60-foot Barnett-class, built by J. Samuel White of Cowes, with twin 80-hp White DE6 petrol engines, and costing £14,536.

In March 1943, the Robert and Marcella was sent for maintenance, and the reserve boat placed on station was a modified and refurbished 46-foot Watson-class Belgian lifeboat, Ministre Anseele (ON 845), which had been found drifting derelict in the English Channel at the start of World War II. However, before she could return to service, Robert and Marcella was requisitioned by the Admiralty, then seeing service in Wick, the Faroe Islands, and providing life-saving operations from Iceland on the most hazardous of the Arctic convoy routes, the northern route to Arkhangelsk, Russia. She returned to Plymouth in 1947.

=== 1960s onwards ===
In 1964, in response to an increasing amount of water-based leisure activity, the RNLI placed 25 small fast Inshore lifeboats around the country. These were easily launched with just a few people, ideal to respond quickly to local emergencies. The D-class (RFD PB16) Inshore lifeboat (D-130) was additionally placed at Plymouth in 1967. At the time, the RNLI were investigating a larger class of Inshore boat, that would bridge the gap between the smaller D-class, and the standard All-weather lifeboats. These boats would have a rigid hull, capable of being moored afloat, and offering the option of being a boarding boat, but still be fast, and easy to launch. In 1968, the station received one of just two 18-foot (5.5 m) A-class (Hatch) Inshore lifeboats, (18-01).

A succession of A-class (McLachlan) fast rigid-hull Inshore lifeboats followed, but in 1983, the Inshore lifeboat capability at Plymouth was withdrawn. Since 1967, the boats had been launched 177 times, saving 73 lives.

A new station was built on the Princess Royal Pier in 1979 and a new mooring was provided alongside. From 1988 until 1992 the lifeboat was moored in Sutton Harbour while the area around the Princess Royal Pier was redeveloped as a marina, but it then returned to Millbay.

Since 1992 the All-weather lifeboat has been moored afloat on the eastern side of the Millbay basin. It was decided to re-establish the Inshore lifeboat capability with a B-class Inshore lifeboat in 2004. The current ILB is kept alongside the ALB on a floating 'aquadock'.

Crew facilities and storage are in the old Customs House on the quay close to the moorings. This is a Grade II Listed building, erected in 1850 to the design of George Wightwick. It is built from granite, octagonal in plan and three storeys high. This once gave H.M. Customs officers all-round views of the harbour, a view now afforded to the lifeboat crews. The building was refurbished partly from a grant from Plymouth council, and partly from a specific bequest from Mrs Eugenie Boucher, a native of Penza in south-east Russia, who left £3.5 million for the provision of boathouses. The eight new or refurbished boathouses are known as "Penza" boathouses within the RNLI.

== Area of operation ==
The RNLI aims to reach any casualty up to 50 miles (80 km) from its stations, and within two hours in good weather. To do this the Severn class lifeboat at Plymouth has an operating range of 250 nautical miles (460 km) and a top speed of 25 knots (46 km/h). The Atlantic 85 can go out in Force 7 winds (Force 6 at night) and can operate at up to 35 knots (65 km/h) for 3 hours. Adjacent All-weather lifeboats are stationed at Salcombe to the east, and Falmouth to the west. There are two Inshore lifeboats stationed at Looe, and two more at Fowey.

== Station awards ==
On 13 January 1942, during the Second World War, the RNLB Robert and Marcella Beck was called out to a Sunderland flying boat of the Royal Australian Air Force, which had been blown onto rocks in a storm. The lifeboat crew managed to get a rope across to the aircraft and towed it and the crew to safety. Coxswain Walter Crowther was awarded a bronze medal for leading the rescue.

A bronze medal was awarded to Coxswain John Dare "for his courage, determination and excellent seamanship" on 16 January 1974. A Danish coaster, the Merc Enterprise had capsized 26 mi (42 km) south of Rame Head. The RNLB Thomas Forehead and Mary Rowse (ON 890) fought through hurricane-force winds to reach the casualty. A helicopter managed to winch seven people out of the water while the lifeboat searched unsuccessfully for other survivors. Another bronze medal rescue involving its successor Thomas Forehead and Mary Rowse II (ON 1028) took place on 15 February 1978. The Elly Gerda ran aground near Looe in a Force 8 storm. The lifeboat managed to rescue two of the trawler's crew but the heavy seas then washed the trawler off the rocks. The lifeboat escorted it back into harbour and then returned to Plymouth, where it had left its berth nearly 14 hours earlier. The RNLI awarded medals to both the Coxswain, Patrick Marshall, and the Mechanic, Cyril Alcock, "for their courage, determination and seamanship".

The lifeboat crew saved a yacht in a Force 9 gale and rain storm in 2002. Second Coxswain Sean Marshall was awarded a bronze medal for his bravery and the 'Thanks of the Institute Inscribed on Vellum' was given to Coxswain David Milford.

The five crew of a French trawler abandoned ship on 25 February 1985 but were rescued from their life-raft by the Plymouth lifeboat. Coxswain John Dare was given the 'Thanks of the Institution Inscribed on Vellum' for leading the rescue. Patrick Marshall received the same recognition for saving a fishing boat with its crew of five, which was dragging its anchor in a storm on 6 September 1995.

The following are awards made at Plymouth:

- RNIPLS Silver Medal
  James Craggs, Boatman, H.M. Coastguard, Yealm – 1825
  John Miller, Boatman, H.M. Coastguard, Cawsand – 1825
  Richard Eddy, Pilot – 1825
  Lt. John Woolland Bake, RN, H.M. Coastguard, Bovisand – 1828
  Francis M. Strong, Second Master, H.M.S. Spartiate – 1833
  Thomas Huss, Master's Assistant, RN, H.M.S. Rover – 1833
  Augustus Charles May, Mate, RN, H.M.S. Rover – 1833
  Lt. Adrian Thomas Mann, RN, H.M. Coastguard, Devonport – 1833
  Richard Eddy, Pilot – 1834 (Second-Service Silver Medal)
  Richard Eddy, Pilot – 1834 (Third-Service Silver Boat)
  Lt. Thomas Holloway Holman, RN, H.M. Coastguard, Bovisand – 1838
  James Samuel William Grandy, Mate, Revenue Cutter Harpy – 1839
  Andrew Gillespie, Gunner, Revenue Cutter Stork – 1839
  Lt. John Cornish, RN, H.M. Coastguard, Bovisand – 1843
- RNLI Silver Medal
  William Teel, Coxswain – 1884
- RNLI Bronze Medal
  Walter Digory Crowther, Coxswain – 1942
  John Dare, Coxswain – 1974
  Patrick John Marshall, Acting Coxswain – 1978
  Cyril Alcock, Motor Mechanic – 1978
  Sean Marshall, Second Coxswain – 2003
- Medal Service Certificate
  Cyril Alcock, Motor Mechanic – 1974
  Patrick John Marshall, Asst Mechanic – 1974
  Michael Keane, crew member – 1974
  David Dinham, crew member – 1974
  Frank Parker, crew member – 1974
  Douglas Jago, crew member – 1974
  Michael Foster, crew member – 1978
  Ivor Loverigg, crew member – 1978
- The Thanks of the Institution inscribed on Vellum
  Cmdr. Aylen, RN – 1865
  W. J. Williams, Coxswain – 1920
  J. Stoker, Leading Stoker – 1920
  Cmdr. Freyberg, RN – 1920
  Frederick Eagles, Coxswain – 1929
  James Roach, Coxswain – 1932
  Eight crew members – 1942
  John Dare, Coxswain – 1985
  Patrick Marshall, Coxswain – 1995
  David Milford, Coxswain – 2002
  David Milford, Coxswain – 2003
  Sean Marshall, Second Coxswain – 2003
- Vellum Service Certificate
  Plymouth Lifeboat Crew – 1985
- Letter of Appreciation, received from the Government of the Netherlands
  Plymouth lifeboat station – 1936
- British Empire Medal
  Cyril Alcock, Mechanic – 1987QBH

== Plymouth lifeboats ==
=== Pulling and sailing lifeboats ===
On station	ON (Note: ON is the RNLI's Official Number of the boat.)	Name	Built	Class	Comments
1803–c.1824	–	Unnamed	1803	Greathead	(Note: Greathead-class lifeboat of undetermined size, funded by Philip Langmead, MP for Plymouth (constituency), built by Henry Greathead of South Shields.); No trace by 1824.
1825–1840	Pre-108	Unnamed	1825	26-foot Plenty	(Note: 26 ft 0 in (7.92 m) x 8 ft 6 in (2.59 m) (10-oared) Plenty-class lifeboat, funded by the RNIPLS, built by William Plenty of Newbury, Berkshire, costing £120.); Transferred to St Mary's.
1862–1873	Pre-386	Prince Consort	1862	34-foot Peake Self-righting (P&S)	(Note: 34 ft 0 in (10.36 m) x 7 ft 1 in (2.16 m) (6-oared, single banked / 12-oars, double banked) Peake-class self-righting (P&S) lifeboat, gift of Miss Burdett-Coutts of London, built by Forrestt of Limehouse, London, costing £180. Found to be too narrow for 12 oars d/b, altered to 10 oars d/b by Waterman of Cremyll in 1865.); Withdrawn following damage incurred while rescuing 12 people from two vessels in a gale on 8 December 1872. Broken up in 1873.
1873–1885	Pre-577	Clemency	1873	34-foot Self-righting (P&S)	(Note: 34 ft 0 in (10.36 m) x 7 ft 9 in (2.36 m) (10-oared) self-righting (P&S) lifeboat, gift of the Hon. Mrs J. G. Hubbard of London, built by Woolfe of Shadwell, London, costing £294.); Broken up in 1885.
1885–1898	44	Escape	1885	34-foot 4in Self-righting (P&S)	(Note: 34 ft 4 in (10.46 m) x 7 ft 6 in (2.29 m) (10-oared) self-righting (P&S) lifeboat, gift of Mrs L. Harris of Lower Clifton, built by Forrestt of Limehouse, London, costing £327.); Broken up in 1898
1898–1922	412	Eliza Avins	1898	37-foot Self-righting (P&S)	(Note: 37 ft 0 in (11.28 m) x 9 ft 3 in (2.82 m) (10-oared) self-righting (P&S) lifeboat, legacy of Mr John Avins of Moseley, Worcestershire, with a further donation from his widow Eliza, built by Simpson of Dartmouth, Devon, costing £699.); Sold in 1924.
1922–1926	531	Brothers Freeman	1904	35-foot Self-righting (P&S)	(Note: 35 ft 0 in (10.67 m) x 8 ft 6 in (2.59 m) (10-oared) self-righting (P&S) lifeboat, legacy of Mr F. J. Freeman of London, built by Thames Ironworks of Blackwall, London, costing £800.); Previously at Littlehampton. Sold in 1926.

Pre ON numbers are unofficial numbers used by the Lifeboat Enthusiasts' Society to reference early lifeboats not included on the official RNLI list.

=== Motor lifeboats ===
On station	ON	Op.No. (Note: Op.No. is the RNLI's Operational Number of the boat carried on the hull.)	Name	Built	Class	Comments
1926–1943	696	–	Robert and Marcella Beck	1926	60-foot Barnett	Requisitioned by the Admiralty in March 1943 and stationed in Iceland during World War II
1943–1946	845	–	Ministre Anseele	1926	46-foot Watson	A Belgian lifeboat, found derelict in the English Channel early in the war, repaired and placed on service. Returned to the Belgian Government in 1946. Sold in 1947. At Leopoldsburg, Belgium, May 2025.
1946–1947	671	–	The Brothers	1922	45-foot Watson	Transferred to Workington.
1947–1952	696	–	Robert and Marcella Beck	1926	60-foot Barnett	Sold 1952. Renamed Idle Hours, at Lemmer, Netherlands, October 2025
1952–1974	890	–	Thomas Forehead and Margaret Rowse	1952	52-foot Barnett (Mk. I)	Transferred to the relief fleet, Sold in 1982. Renamed Lynda II, later Isle Ornsay, Under refit at Porth Penryn, Bangor, September 2025.
1974–1987	1028	44-010	Thomas Forehead and Margaret Rowse II	1974	Waveney	Transferred to Fowey.
1988–2002	1136	52-40	City of Plymouth	1987	Arun	Sold in 2005 for further service as the lifeboat 2637 Húnabjörg at Skagaströnd, Iceland.
2003–	1264	17-35	Sybil Mullen Glover	2002	Severn	

More post-service details can be found on the respective lifeboat class pages.

=== Inshore lifeboats 1967–1983 ===
On station	Op.No.	Built	Class	Comments
1967–1968	D-130	1967	D-class (RFD PB16)	
1968–1972	18-01	1966	A-class (Hatch)	Renumbered A-1 in 1972
1972–1977	A-509	1972	A-class (McLachlan)	
1977–1979	A-507	1971	A-class (McLachlan)	Previously Op.No. (18-007)
1979–1980	A-506	1971	A-class (McLachlan)	Previously Op.No. (18-006)
1980–1983	A-507	1971	A-class (McLachlan)	Previously Op.No. (18-007)

Hatch and McLachlan lifeboats were initially numbered 18-XXX in the ALB series, but were redesignated as A-class lifeboats and renumbered in the ILB series from 1972.

=== Inshore lifeboats from 2004 ===
On station	Op.No.	Name	Class	Comments
2004–2005	B-775	Millennium Forester	B-class (Atlantic 75)	
2005	B-700	Susan Peacock	B-class (Atlantic 75)	The first Atlantic 75 lifeboat, it entered service in 1992.
2005–2006	B-769	Coventry and Warwickshire	B-class (Atlantic 75)	First stationed at Weston-super-Mare in 2001, it was stationed there again from 2008 until 2018.
2006–2018	B-775	Millennium Forester	B-class (Atlantic 75)	
2016–2020	A-31	Unnamed	Arancia	
2018–	B-908	Annabel E Jones	B-class (Atlantic 85)	

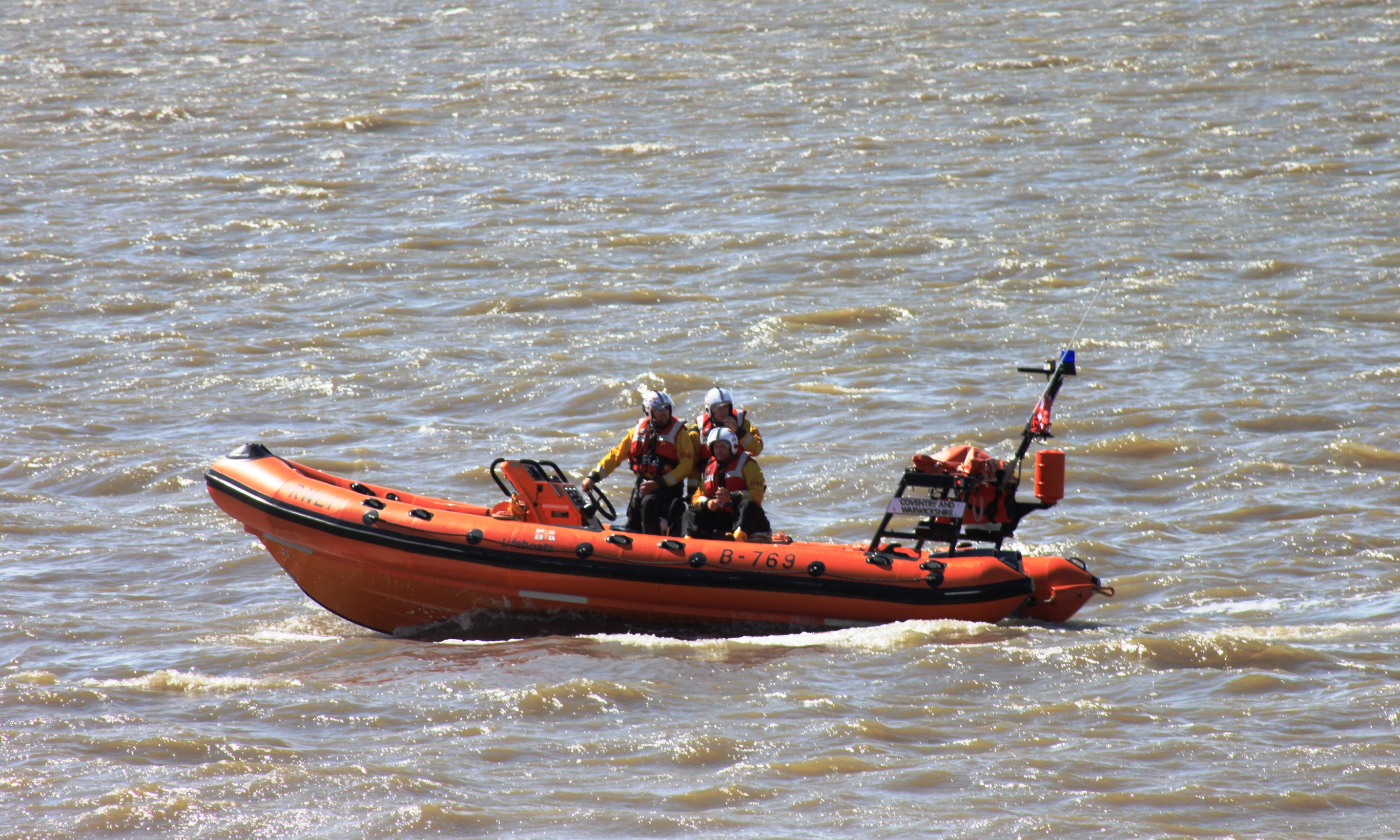
Coventry and Warwickshire

== See also ==
- List of RNLI stations
- List of former RNLI stations
- Royal National Lifeboat Institution lifeboats
