= Portsmouth Lifeboat Station =

RNLI Lifeboat station in Hampshire, England

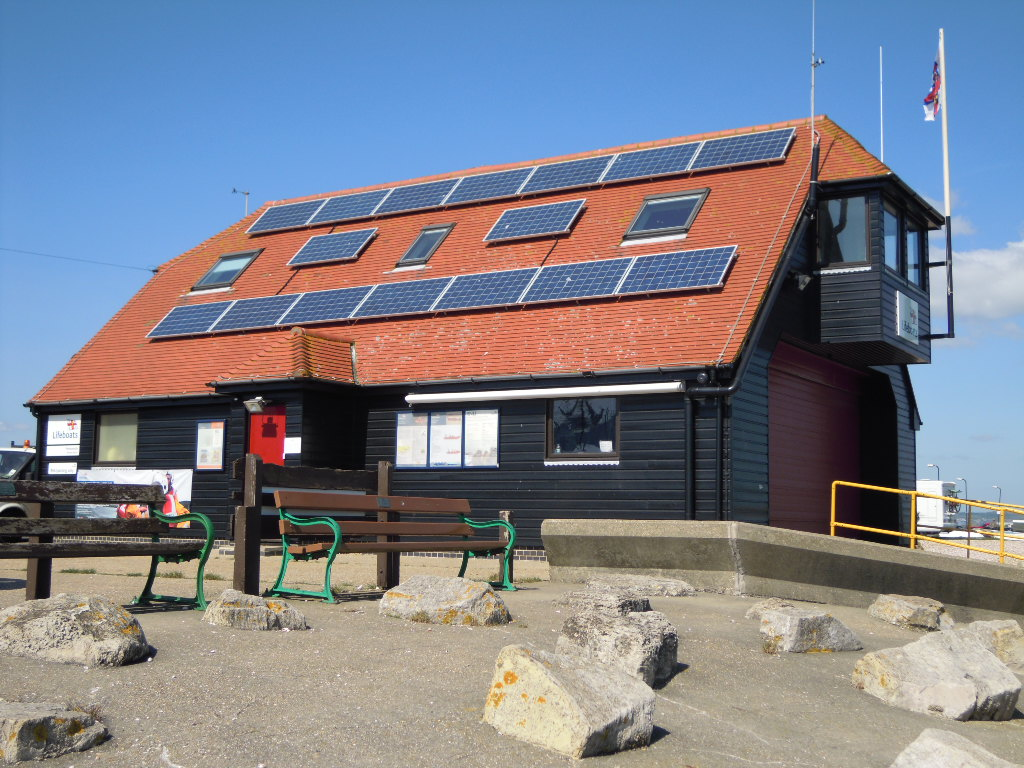
- Portsmouth Lifeboat Station.

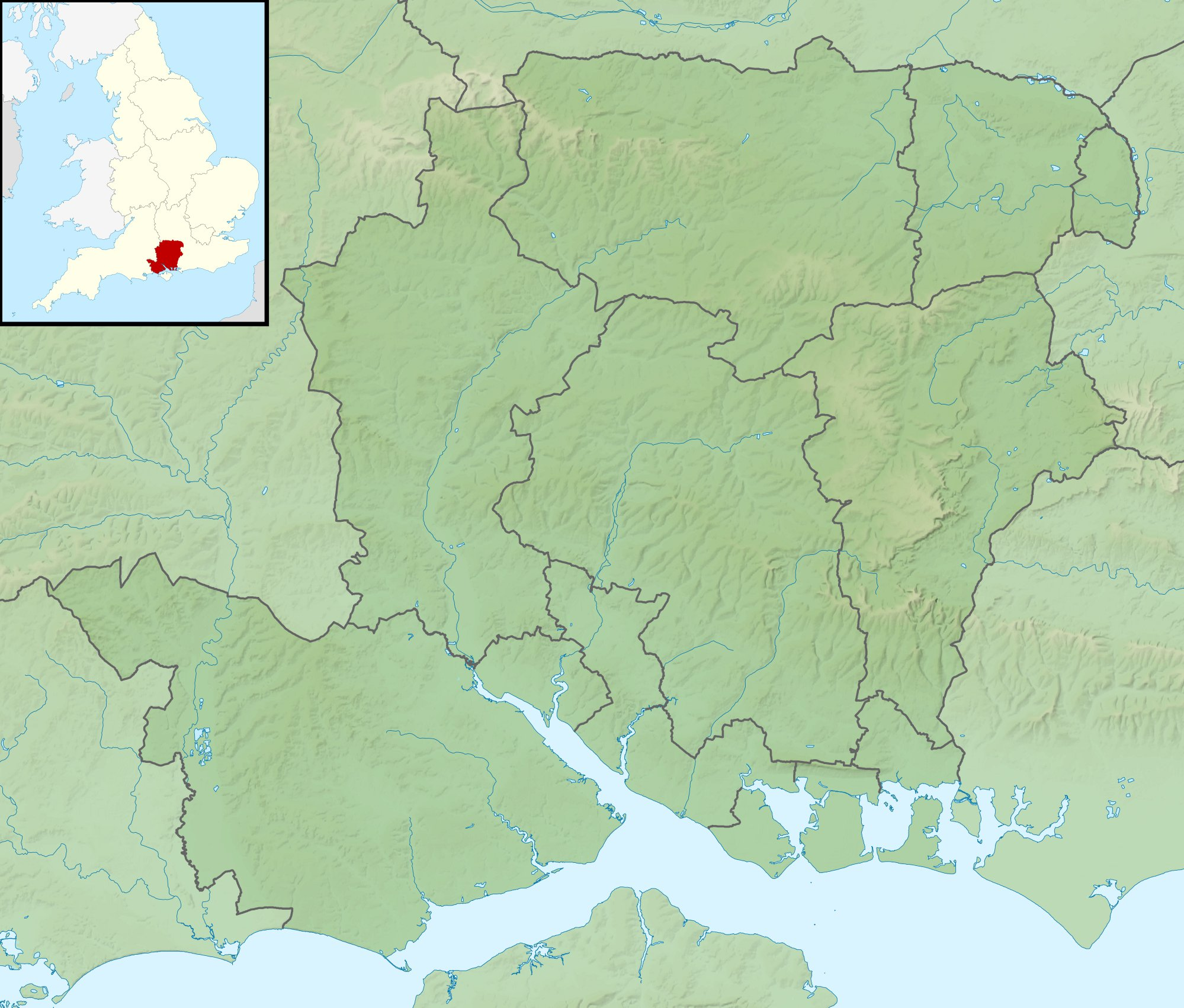
- Location within Hampshire
- Former names: Eastney; Portsmouth (Langstone Harbour)

General information
- Type: RNLI Lifeboat Station
- Location: Portsmouth Lifeboat Station, Ferry Road, Southsea, Hampshire, PO4 9LY, England
- Coordinates: 50°47′42.7″N 1°01′47.3″W
- Opened: May 1965
- Owner: Royal National Lifeboat Institution

Website
- Portsmouth RNLI Lifeboat Station

Portsmouth Lifeboat Station is located at Eastney Point near Southsea, on Portsea Island, in the English county of Hampshire. It sits facing Langstone Harbour on one of the tributaries flowing into the Solent.

A lifeboat station was first established on Portsea Island at Southsea in 1886 by the Royal National Lifeboat Institution (RNLI), but was closed in 1918. An Inshore lifeboat station was re-established at Eastney in May 1965.

The station currently operates two Inshore lifeboats, a B-class (Atlantic 85) lifeboat, Norma T (B-846), on station since 23 October 2010, and a smaller D-class (IB1) lifeboat, The Dennis Faro (D-850), on station since 2020.

== History ==
In 1886, the RNLI established a lifeboat station at Southsea. The location was considered to be an ideal position "whence a Life-boat can proceed, either under sail or in tow of the Admiralty or other steam-tugs, to shipwrecks along that coast and round the eastern approaches to Spithead."

The Heyland (ON 34), a 37-foot 12-oared 'Pulling and Sailing' (P&S) lifeboat, one with oars and sails, built in 1882, was placed at Southsea. The Southsea station was closed in 1918 when the RNLI decided that the area was adequately covered by the stations at Hayling Island and Bembridge.

For further information, please see:

- Southsea Lifeboat Station

In 1964, in response to an increasing amount of water-based leisure activity, the RNLI placed 25 small fast Inshore lifeboats around the country. These were easily launched with just a few people, ideal to respond quickly to local emergencies.

More stations were opened, and in May 1965, a lifeboat station was re-established on Portsea Island. Eastney Lifeboat Station opened with the arrival of a D-class (RFD PB16) Inshore lifeboat, the unnamed (D-48).

A boathouse was constructed at Eastney Point, facing Langstone Harbour. The first Inshore lifeboat (D-48) was paid for by funds raised by Hemel Hempstead Round Table. By 1967 the station was also operating a rigid hull inshore lifeboat, with the craft being kept at permanent anchor in the harbour at Eastney.

At 03:15 on 7 September 1974, Eastney lifeboat station was alerted by Shoreham Coastguard. to red flares sighted in Langstone channel. The Inshore lifeboat D-184 was launched at 03:43, into a SSW force 9 gale. Arriving on scene 13 minutes later at 03:59, they found a man and boy, lashed both together, and to their boat, the motor cruiser Valon. With great skill in difficult conditions, the lifeboat was brought alongside, and both man and boy were recovered to the lifeboat. The return trip took twice as long as the outward trip due to the conditions, after which both casualties to transferred to the Royal Portsmouth Hospital. For this service, all three lifeboat crew were awarded the RNLI Bronze Medal, crew member Dennis Faro receiving a second-service clasp to his previously won bronze medal.

In 1975 a new B-class (Atlantic 21), Guide Friendship II (B-530) was placed on service, replacing the A-class (McLachlan) (A-505). A new boathouse was constructed to house both the B-class and D-class lifeboats. In 1978, the station name was formally changed to Portsmouth (Langstone Harbour) Lifeboat Station.

The boat house was re-developed in 1991, at a cost of £90,000, and was officially opened on 27 October. Crew were provided with a changing/kit drying room, new toilet and shower facilities and a first aid reception room. Also within the building there is a workshop, training and briefing room, and a station office. In 1995, the station name was changed once again, becoming Portsmouth Lifeboat Station. An extension to the boathouse was completed in 2002.

In 2009, the D-class (EA16) lifeboat Heyland II (D-554) was replaced by a new D-class (IB1) lifeboat. It was named Brian's Pride (D-716), funded by longtime lifeboat fundraisers Brian and Marilyn Bass. The boat served for 11 years, and during that time launched 341 times, aided 250 people, and saved 26 lives.

The current B-class (Atlantic 85) lifeboat, Norma T (B-846), was placed on service in 2010, provided by the donation of Bob and Norma Thomas.

In 2020, Brian's Pride (D-716) was replaced by The Dennis Faro (D-850), The boat was named in honour of the late former helm of Portsmouth lifeboat, Dennis Faro, twice awarded the RNLI Bronze Medal for gallantry, who died in 2006 age 80.

== Station honours ==
The following are awards made at Portsmouth

- RNLI Bronze Medal
  Dennis Faro, Helm – 1973
  Sydney Ronald Stanley Thayers, Helm – 1974
  William Charles Hawkins, crew member – 1974
  Dennis Faro, crew member – 1974 (Second-Service clasp)
- The Thanks of the Institution inscribed on Vellum
  Dr I. T. McLachlan – 1965
  D. Cook-Radmore – 1965
  S. Thayers – 1965
  Robert John Faro – 1967
  Roy Richards – 1967
  Dr I. T. McLachlan – 1970
  P. Bannister – 1970
  R. B. Needle – 1970
  R. B. Needle – 1970
  John Fletcher, Helm – 1972
  Martin Icke, Helm – 1989
  Paul Venton, crew member – 1989
  Adrian West, crew member – 1989
  Martin Icke, Helm – 1996
  Paul Clark, crew member – 2005
  Tobi O’Neill, crew member – 2005
- Vellum Service Certificate
  Francis T. Hawkins, crew member – 1972
  Graham Jewell, crew member – 1972
- A Framed Letter of Thanks signed by the Chairman of the Institution
  Stephen Alexander, Helmsman – 1988
  Adrian West, crew member – 1988
  Paul Venton, crew member – 1988
  James Beach, crew member – 1988
  John Brooks, Helm – 2005
- A Letter of appreciation
  Lifeboat Crew – 1966

== Portsmouth lifeboats ==
=== D-class ===
Op. No. (Note: Op. No. is the RNLI's Operational Number of the boat carried on the hull.)	Name	On station	Class	Comments
D-48	Unnamed	1965−1970	D-class (RFD PB16)	
D-184	Unnamed	1970−1983	D-class (RFD PB16)	
D-296	Unnamed	1984−1992	D-class (RFD PB16)	
D-421	Lord Raglan	1992−2000	D-class (EA16)	
D-554	Heyland II	2000−2009	D-class (EA16)	
D-716	Brian’s Pride	2009−2020	D-class (IB1)	
D-850	The Dennis Faro	2020−	D-class (IB1)	

=== A-class ===
Op. No.	Name	On station	Class	Comments
18-02	Unnamed	1967−1968	A-class (McLachlan)	
17-01	Unnamed	1968−1969	A-class (Dory)	
18-02	Unnamed	1969−1970	A-class (McLachlan)	
18-005	Unnamed	1970−1971	A-class (McLachlan)	
18-008	Unnamed	1971−1974	A-class (McLachlan)	Renumbered A-508 in 1972
A-505	Unnamed	1974–1975	A-class (McLachlan)	Previously 18-005

=== B-class ===
Op. No.	Name	On station	Class	Comments
B-530	Guide Friendship II	1975−1981	B-class (Atlantic 21)	
B-550	City of Portsmouth	1981−1996	B-class (Atlantic 21)	
B-730	CSMA Frizzell	1996−2010	B-class (Atlantic 75)	
B-846	Norma T	2010−	B-class (Atlantic 85)	

== See also ==
- List of RNLI stations
- List of former RNLI stations
- Royal National Lifeboat Institution lifeboats
