= Pill Lifeboat Station =

Former RNLI lifeboat station in Somerset, England

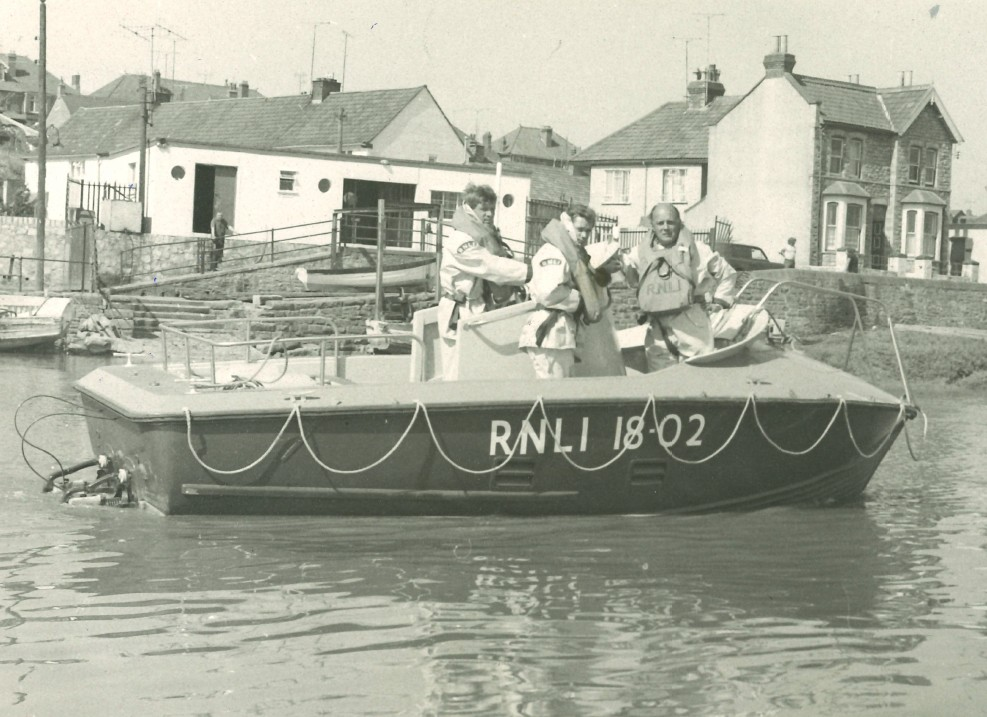
- Pill lifeboat 1971

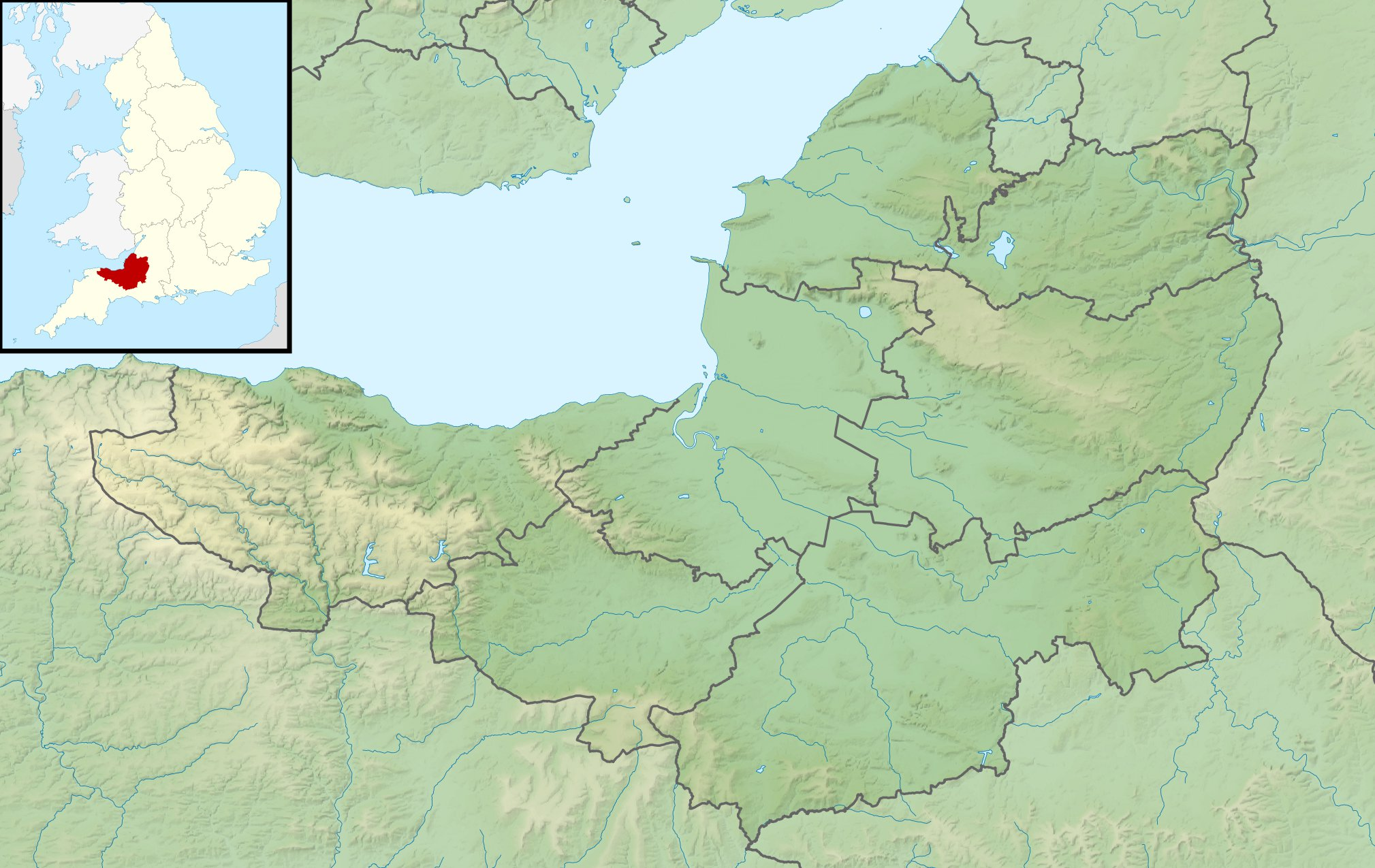
- Location within Somerset

General information
- Status: Closed
- Type: RNLI Lifeboat Station
- Location: Marine Parade, Pill, Somerset, BS20 0BG, England
- Coordinates: 51°28′56.0″N 2°41′04.6″W
- Opened: 1971
- Closed: 1974

Pill Lifeboat Station was located in Pill, a village sitting on the southern bank of the River Avon, approximately 6 mi (9.7 km) north-west of Bristol, in the administrative county of North Somerset.

A lifeboat was first placed at Pill on 8 July 1971, by the Royal National Lifeboat Institution (RNLI).

After just over three years of operation, Pill lifeboat station was closed in November 1974.

== History ==
In 1971, it was decided to establish a new lifeboat station at Pill, a village on the south bank of the River Avon, downstream from the City of Bristol, and approximately 1.5 mi (2.4 km) from Avonmouth and the River Severn. The village had traditionally been the home of the river pilots, where a regular crew could be found, and was a good location to provide rescue coverage for the area north of Weston-super-Mare to the Severn Bridge.

Bristol pilot John Rich was appointed as Honorary Secretary, a role better known today as the lifeboat operations manager, and his deputy was Bob Brown, who for the previous year operated a launch named Betty Brown, acting as Pill's auxiliary lifeboat.

Twelve local men were selected to join the crew, many drawn from the group of 'Pill Hobblers', the pilots who would navigate vessels up the River Avon to Bristol, and related family members. By June 1971, the crew were already undertaking some medical training at the local Ham Green Hospital, with practical boat training, including night navigation, scheduled on the Betty Brown.

The crew operated from the premises of the Portishead Cruising Club at Pill, where there were changing rooms, and storage for equipment.

The boat provided was 18-02, an 18 ft (5.5 m) McLachlan-class, arriving on station on 8 July 1971, and was kept at moorings at the mouth of Pill creek, provided by the Pill Ferry Company. Initially designated as an off-shore boat, and given the operational number (ON) 18-02, these boats were later re-designated as Inshore lifeboats, with this one renumbered A-503. The boat was on service on a seasonal basis.

The lifeboat station at Pill had a relatively short lifespan, ultimately brought to a close by a number of factors. The announcement in 1969 of the intended closure of Bristol Docks, and the construction of the Royal Portbury Docks from 1972, brought about a gradual decline in river traffic, and a reduction in the need for pilots, who were also lifeboat crew.

By December 1973, the Institution was already considering relocating the station to Portishead, due to the severe silting of the river. The silting caused operational difficulties, with the boat being unable to launch on certain tides, and the high proportion of mud in suspension in the water was causing problems with the engines.

However, it was the opening of the new Avonmouth Bridge in May 1974, which indirectly brought about the closure of the lifeboat station. Besides the vehicle traffic carried over the bridge along the M5 motorway, the bridge also featured a footpath and cycle-way alongside the road, and this inevitably resulted in the demise of the Pill Ferry, operating for the last time on 1 November 1974. With the mooring for the lifeboat no longer available, nobody on hand every day to keep an eye on the lifeboat, and no commercial reason to clear the area of silt, the station was closed. In the short time on station, the lifeboats had been launched 39 times, saving 18 lives.

At a ceremony held at the Duke of Cornwall Inn in June 1975, a "Framed Letter of Thanks", signed by the Chairman of the Institution, was presented to each of the crew by RNLI divisional organiser Cmdr Peter D. Sturdee.

A separate presentation took place at the Lifeboat Day held at Dodington, Gloucestershire on 7 September 1975, where deputy Lord Mayor of Bristol Cllr. Albert Pegler presented Pill lifeboat Honorary Secretary John Rich with "The Thanks of the Institution inscribed on Vellum".

It had been intended that the RNLI would transfer its Inshore lifeboat from Pill to Portishead, but no details were ever finalised, and the lifeboat was withdrawn.

Meanwhile, the Severn Area Rescue Association had been established further up the River Severn at Tutshill in 1973, and a rescue craft had been operated by the Portishead Yacht and Sailing Club, based at Sugar Loaf Beach, since 1970. The Portishead Y&SC rescue boat evolved to become managed by the Portishead Lifeboat Trust (PLT), a charity established in 1996. In 2011, the PLT approached the RNLI with a view to being adopted by the Institution. Finally, in 2015, some 41 years after the closure of Pill Lifeboat Station, Portishead Lifeboat Station was established, with the RNLI once again providing lifeboat cover for the Avonmouth area.

== Station honours ==
The following are awards made at Pill.

- The Thanks of the Institution inscribed on Vellum
  John Rich, Honorary Secretary – 1975
- A Framed Letter of Thanks signed by the Chairman of the Institution

Graham I. Rice, Mechanic – 1975
Royston Rice – 1975
Robert Rice – 1975
Albert W. Sharp – 1975
Joseph L. Sharp – 1975
Raymond S. Sharp – 1975
Ernest Harvey – 1975
Robert E. P. Buck – 1975

Robert J. Williams – 1975
Robert James – 1975
Denis F. W. Webber – 1975
Christopher Clark – 1975
C. Rice – 1975
D. Williams – 1975
R. Brown – 1975

== Pill lifeboats ==
=== Inshore lifeboats ===
Op. No. (Note: Op. No. is the RNLI's Operational Number of the boat.)	Name	On station	Class	Launches	Saved	Comments
18-02	Unnamed	1971–1972	A-class (McLachlan)	25	6	Later renumbered A-503
A-510	Unnamed	1973–1974	A-class (McLachlan)	14	12	

== See also ==
- List of RNLI stations
- List of former RNLI stations
- Royal National Lifeboat Institution lifeboats
