= St Mary's Lifeboat Station =

RNLI Lifeboat station on the Isles of Scilly

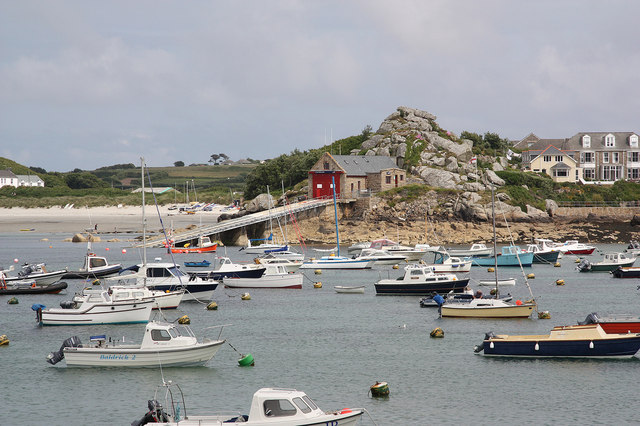
- St Mary's Lifeboat Station, Isles of Scilly

- Location within Isles of Scilly

General information
- Type: RNLI Lifeboat Station
- Location: Carn Thomas, Hugh Town, St Mary's, Isles of Scilly, TR21 0PS, UK
- Coordinates: 49°55′0.5″N 6°18′42.0″W
- Opened: RNIPLS, 1837–1855; RNLI 1874–present
- Owner: Royal National Lifeboat Institution

Website
- St Mary's RNLI Lifeboat Station

St Mary's Lifeboat Station sits overlooking Harbour Bay at Carn Thomas in Hugh Town, the primary settlement on St Mary's, the largest and most populous island of the Isles of Scilly, an archipelago off the south-west coast of the county of Cornwall, England.

A lifeboat station was established at St Mary's in 1837, operating until its closure in 1855. The station was re-established by the Royal National Lifeboat Institution (RNLI) in 1874.

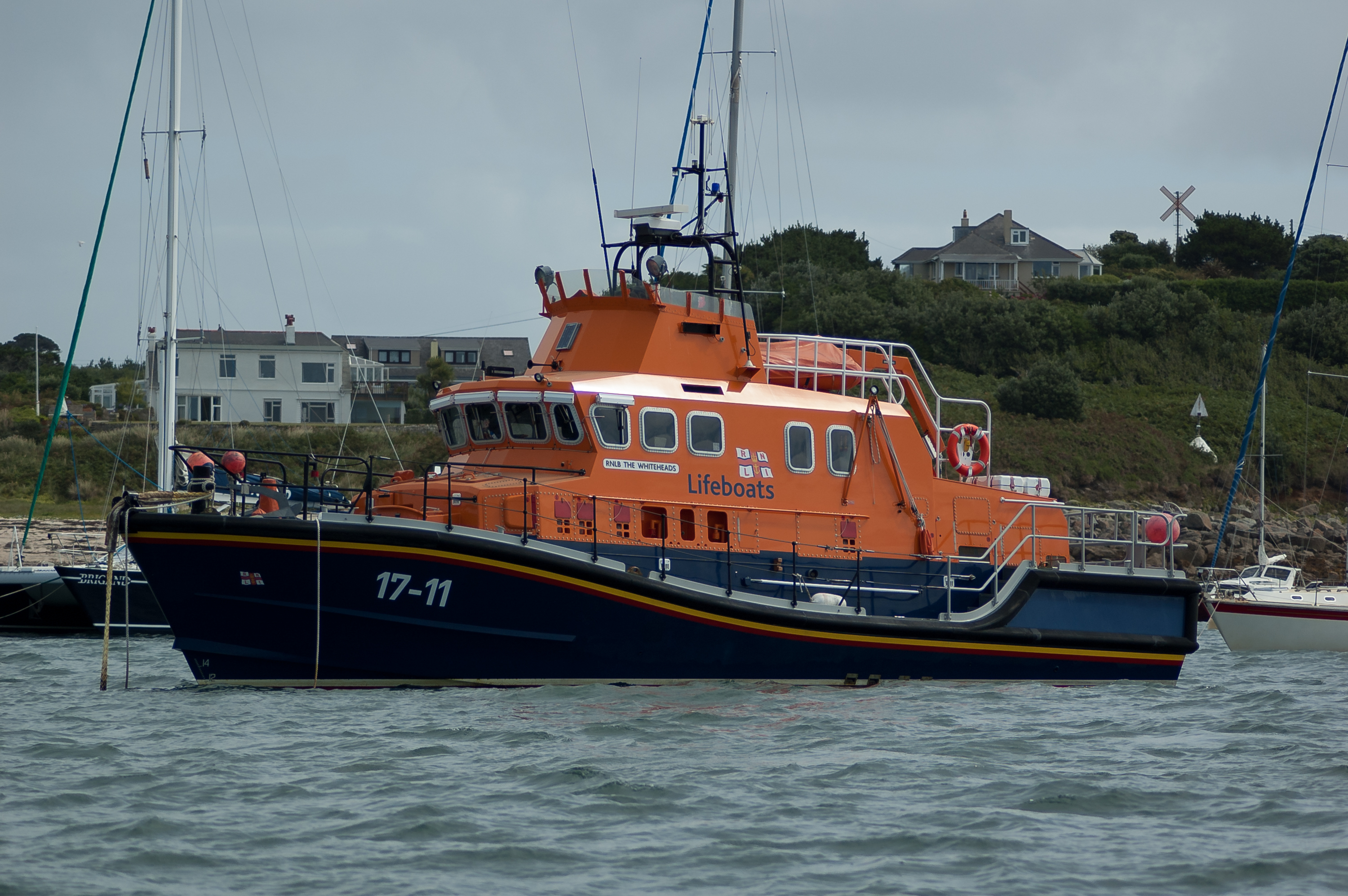
St Mary's Lifeboat RNLB 17-11 The Whiteheads (ON 1229)

The station currently operates the Severn-class All-weather lifeboat 17-11 The Whiteheads (ON 1229), on station since 1997.

== History ==
Ever since its founding in 1824, the Royal National Institution for the Preservation of Life from Shipwreck (RNIPLS), later to become the RNLI in 1854, would award medals for deeds of gallantry at sea, even if no lifeboats were involved.

In a hurricane on 13 February 1833, the Cherokee-class brig-sloop HMS Forrester was driven onto Crow Bar, north of St Mary's, drifting onto Crowther Point. At great personal risk, Midshipman Baldwin Arden Wake, RN, swam ashore with a line, allowing the rescue of one officer and 16 men. Wake was awarded the RNIPLS Silver Medal.

In view of this, and other wrecks, Capt. Charles Steel, RN, Inspecting Commander of Coastguard (Isles of Scilly), established a local branch of the RNIPLS, and began to raise funds for the provision of a lifeboat. On 9 May 1837, enclosing the sum of £26-19-6d, he wrote to the headquarters of the Institution with his request, which was read and agreed at a meeting of the committee of management on 21 June. A 20-foot-long (6.1 m) lifeboat, constructed by William Plenty of Newbury in 1824, which had previously served at Brighton, but had never been called on service, was transferred to St Mary's, arriving on 11 September 1837. A boathouse was constructed overlooking Town Beach, at a cost of £59. However, no record of any service has been found.

The boat was condemned in 1839, and so a second boat was provided by the RNIPLS, arriving at St Mary's on 20 March 1840. This was a longer 26 ft (7.9 m) lifeboat, previously serving at Plymouth, and it too had never been called on service.

Just one service is recorded against the second boat. On 4 January 1841, in a severe westerly gale, the steam-packet Thames, on passage to London from Dublin, ran aground on Jacky's Rock. In the terrible conditions, 57 lives were lost from the vessel. For their efforts to save lives, four men were awarded the RNIPLS Silver Medal, with the RNIPLS Gold Medal awarded to Capt. Steel, RN. No further service were recorded. In 1855, the station was closed, and the boat was sold.

Following the wreck of the steamship Delaware on 20 December 1871, and the wreck of the barque Minnehaha on 18 January 1874, with the loss of 10 lives, questions were raised about lifeboat provision.

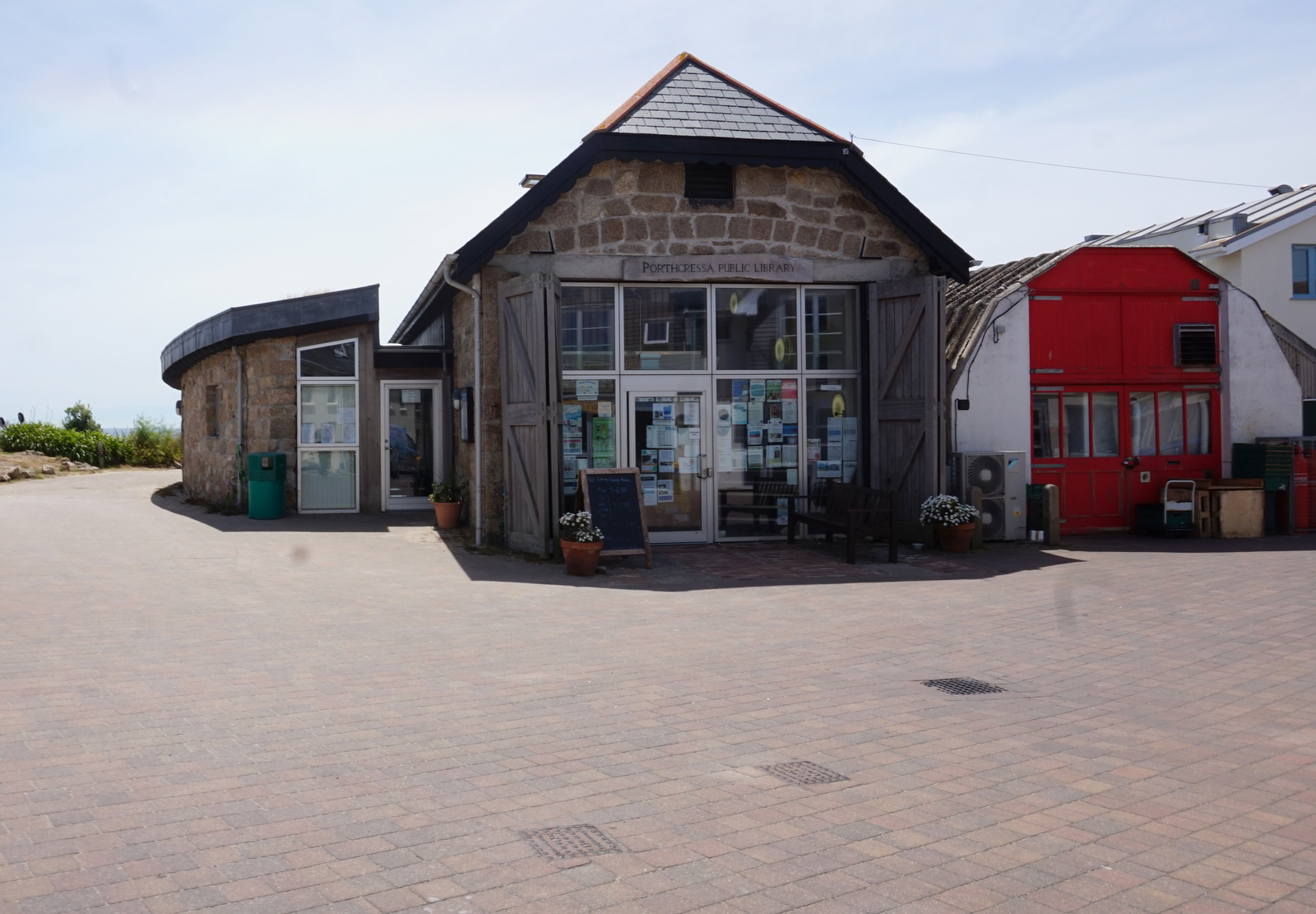
1874 Porth Cressa lifeboat house, now the local public library

With a legacy from the late Mrs S. J. Dundas-Drummond, the Institution decided to re-establish a station at St Mary's, and a 37-foot (11 m) 'Pulling and Sailing' (P&S) lifeboat, one with sails and (12) oars, was towed by steamer from Penzance to the island, arriving on 30 July 1874.

On 1 August, the lifeboat was drawn through the streets of Hugh Town on her carriage in grand procession, to her new station at Porth Cressa. A new boathouse had been constructed at a cost of £280 (equivalent to £27,400 in 2025)., on a site provided by landowner Thomas Algernon Dorien-Smith. After a service performed by the Rev J. H. White, the lifeboat was named Henry Dundas. It would be the first of four lifeboats at St Mary's to carry the name Henry Dundas.

A second lifeboat station was established in the Isles of Scilly in 1890, at St Agnes.

The same year, a new 42 ft (13 m) lifeboat was provided to St Mary's. The Henry Dundas (ON 271), arrived in April 1890, but was too large to fit in the boathouse, and was placed on moorings in St Mary's harbour. The boat performed just one service, on 3 May 1890, to the brigantine Antres on Nantes. However, the larger boat did not find favour with the crew, and in 1891, she was reallocated to Beaumaris, and renamed Tom & Jenny. A replacement 38 ft (12 m) lifeboat again took the name Henry Dundas (ON 313). Launching the lifeboat had always been difficult, requiring at least 30 helpers, and so for the winter months, the lifeboat was placed on the harbour mooring.

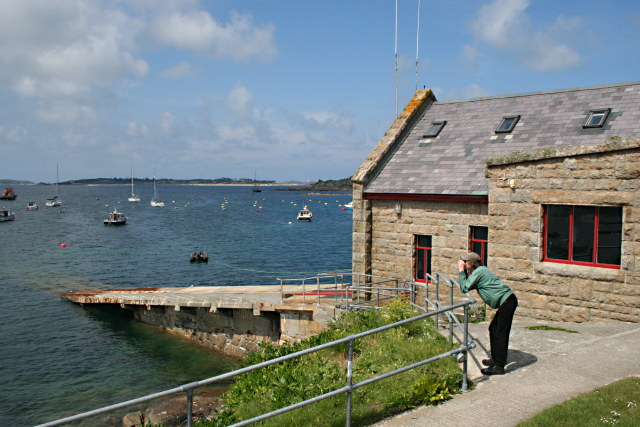
1900 Boathouse at Carn Thomas

Towards the end of the nineteenth century, it was decided to place a new 38-foot Watson-class lifeboat at St Mary's. Construction work began on a new lifeboat house with slipway, at a site at Carn Thomas, at a cost of £1,500 (equivalent to £166,700 in 2025). The new boathouse was completed in 1900, with the old boathouse sold for £40. In 1902 the slipway was extended 40 feet (12 m) by Robert Hicks, to enable the lifeboat to be launched at any state of the tide.

The lifeboat house was modified in 1914, at a cost of £3,155, with £105 donated by Red Star Line in gratitude for services rendered by the lifeboat to the liner Gothland on 23 June. The upgrade was to prepare the boathouse for a new 45-foot Watson-class lifeboat, Elsie (ON 648), the first motor lifeboat to be assigned to St Mary's, but construction of the boat, at the S. E. Saunders factory at Cowes, was delayed until after the end of World War I, with the boat arriving on station in 1919.

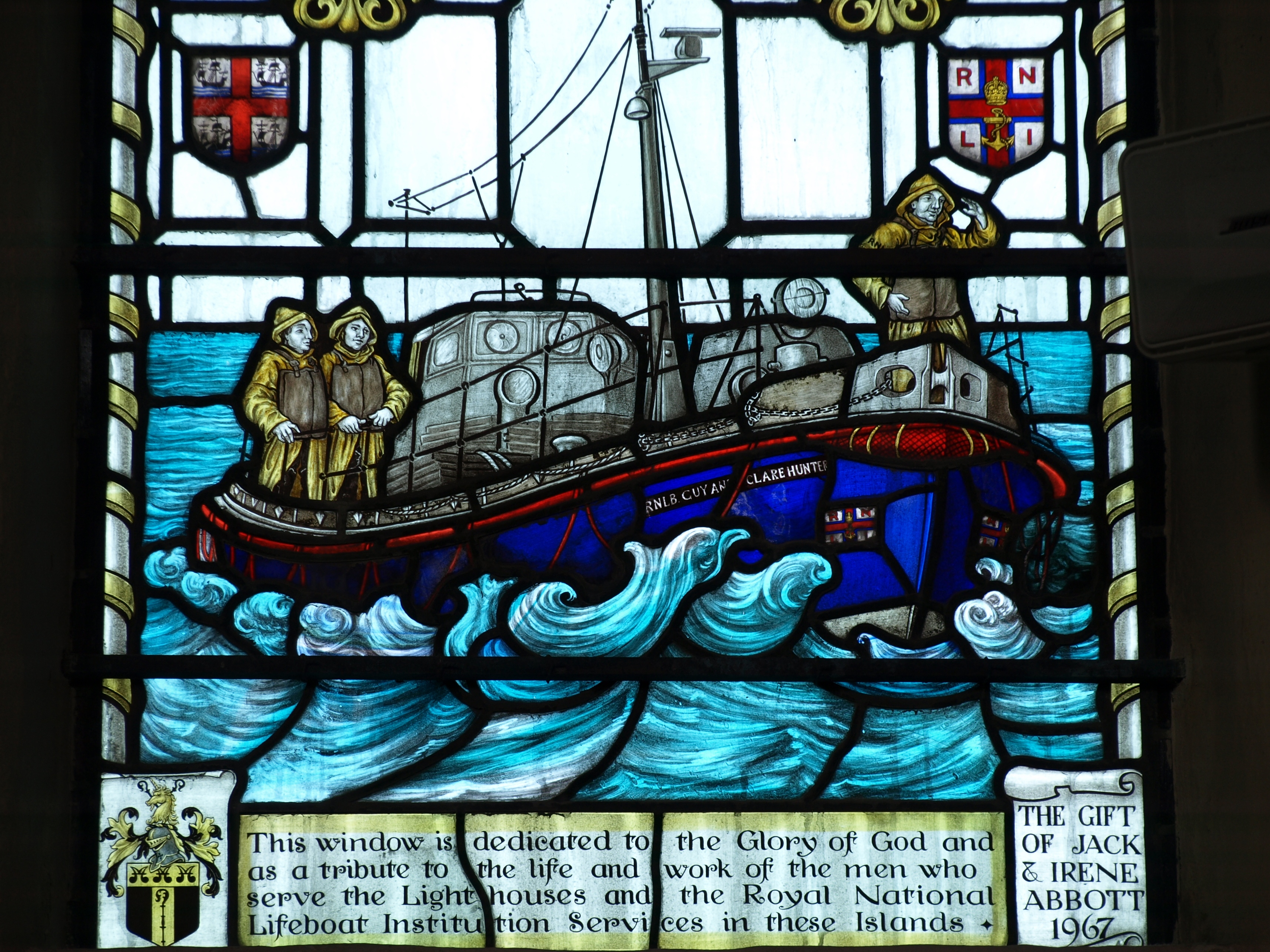
Stained glass window at St Mary's New Church, Hugh Town, Isles of Scilly

In 1967, a 15 ft (4.6 m) tall stained glass window featuring St Mary's 46ft 9in Watson-class lifeboat Guy and Clare Hunter (ON 926), was installed in St Mary's New Church, Hugh Town. The work, created by Alfred L. Wilkinson, of Dovercourt, Essex, was the gift of Jack and Irene Abbot.

The Guy and Clare Hunter (ON 926) would be the last lifeboat to use the slipway at St Mary's, launched for the final time on 7 July 1981.

The replacement lifeboat was the 52 ft (16 m) Arun-class 52-18 Robert Edgar (ON 1073), which was moored afloat. Robert Edgar served St Mary's for 18 years, being transferred first to Weymouth, before being sold for service in New Zealand.

The Severn-class All-weather lifeboat 17-11 The Whiteheads (ON 1229) arrived on station on 1 December 1997, and is the still the current RNLI lifeboat covering the Isles of Scilly.

== Station honours ==
St Mary's Lifeboat has received fifty-six awards for gallantry, including 26 RNLI medals for bravery, comprising one gold, nine silver and 16 bronze. The most recent was in 2004 when bronze medals were awarded to Coxswain Andrew Howells and crew members Mark Bromham and Philip Roberts, for the rescue of an injured man from a yacht on 29 October 2003.

- RNIPLS Gold Medal
  Capt. Charles Steel, RN, Inspecting Commander of H.M. Coastguard – 1841
- RNIPLS Silver Medal
  William Rowe, Boatman, H.M. Coastguard – 1841
  Patrick O'Neil, Boatman, H.M. Coastguard – 1841
  James Hyde, Labourer – 1841
  Barnard Hicks, Seaman – 1841
- RNLI Silver Medal
  Matthew Lethbridge Sr., Coxswain – 1927
  Charles Jenkins, coxswain of the motor boat Sunbeam – 1927
  Matthew Lethbridge Jr., Coxswain – 1967
  Matthew Lethbridge Jr., Coxswain – 1970 (Second-Service clasp)
  Matthew Lethbridge Jr., BEM, Coxswain – 1977 (Third-Service clasp)
- Four Silver Medals, awarded by the Italian Government – 1927
  Matthew Lethbridge Sr., Coxswain – 1927
  Charles Jenkins, coxswain of the motor boat Sunbeam – 1927
  William Edward Jenkins, coxswain of the gig Czar – 1927
  Ernest Jenkins, coxswain of the motor boat Ivy – 1927
- RNLI Bronze Medal
  James Thomas Lethbridge, Second Coxswain – 1927
  John Henry Rokahr, Motor Mechanic – 1927
  William E. Ivers, Doctor – 1927
  Edward Reginald Jenkins, (Sunbeam) – 1927
  William Edward Jenkins, coxswain of the gig Czar – 1927
  Ernest Jenkins, coxswain of the motor boat Ivy – 1927
  Harry Barratt, Acting Coxswain – 1934
  Matthew Lethbridge Sr., Coxswain – 1955
  Ernest Guy, Second Coxswain – 1967
  William Burrow, Motor Mechanic – 1967
  Ernest Guy, Second Coxswain – 1970 (Second-Service clasp)
  William Burrow, Motor Mechanic – 1970 (Second-Service clasp)
  Barry Bennett, Coxswain – 1993
  Andrew Howells, Coxswain – 2004
  Mark Bromham, crew member – 2004
  Philip Roberts, crew member – 2004
- Bronze Medals, awarded by the Italian Government, and
- The Thanks of the Institution inscribed on Vellum
  H. Barrett, Bowman – 1927
  F. Hicks, crew member – 1927
  C. Nance – 1927
  Claude Phillips – 1927
  Clarence Phillips – 1927
  E. A. Guy – 1927
  V. Ellis – 1927
  W. Cameron – 1927
  A. W. Nance – 1927
  Dr W. B. Addison – 1927
  J. Jenkins, (Sunbeam) – 1927
  S. T. Jenkins, (Sunbeam) – 1927
  S. G. Jenkins, (Sunbeam) – 1927
  J. E. Pender, (Sunbeam) – 1927
  S. J. Pender, (Czar) – 1927
  W. T. Pender, (Czar) – 1927
  F. R. Jenkins, (Czar) – 1927
  A. T. Jenkins, (Czar) – 1927
  E. R. Pearce, (Czar) – 1927
  N. J. Jenkins, (Czar) – 1927
  J. J. Jenkins, (Czar) – 1927
  S. Jenkins, (Ivy) – 1927
  J. S. Jenkins, (Ivy) – 1927
- Lady Swaythling Trophy for outstanding seamanship in 2003
  awarded by The Shipwrecked Fishermen and Mariners' Royal Benevolent Society
  Andrew Howells, Coxswain – 2004
- The Thanks of the Institution inscribed on Vellum
  John Rokahr, Motor Mechanic – 1934
  Matthew Lethbridge, Coxswain – 1945
  James T. Lethbridge, Second Coxswain – 1945
  Richard Lethbridge, Bowman – 1967
  William Harry Lethbridge, Assistant Mechanic – 1967
  Frederick Woodcock, crew member – 1967
  George Symons, crew member – 1967
  Rodney Terry, crew member – 1967
  Richard Lethbridge, Bowman – 1970
  William Harry Lethbridge, Assistant Mechanic – 1970
  Rodney Terry, crew member – 1970
  Matthew Lethbridge Jr, Coxswain – 1972
  Rodney Terry, crew member – 1972
  Ernest R. Guy, Second Coxswain – 1977
  William R. Burrow, Motor Mechanic – 1977
  William H. Lethbridge, Assistant Mechanic – 1977
  George W. Symons, crew member – 1977
  Rodney J. Terry, crew member – 1977
  H. Roy Duncan, crew member – 1977
  Matthew Lethbridge Jr., BEM, Coxswain – 1982
  Matthew Lethbridge Jr., BEM, Coxswain – 1983
  Petty Officer Air Crewman David Rigg, RN helicopter R193 – 2004
  Leading Crewman Graham Hatch, RN helicopter R193 – 2004
- The Thanks of the German Government
  St Mary's Lifeboat Crew – 1920
- A Framed Letter of Thanks signed by the Chairman of the Institution
  St Mary's Lifeboat Crew – 1934
  Coxswain and crew – 1967 (SS Torrey Canyon)
- A special framed certificate
  Coxswain and crew of the St Mary's Lifeboat – 1979 (1979 Fastnet Race)
- British Empire Medal
  Matthew Lethbridge Sr. – 1970QBH
  Matthew Lethbridge Jr. – 1975NYH

== Matthew Lethbridge (1924–2010) ==
Matthew Lethbridge (Jr.), BEM, son of Matthew Lethbridge (Sr.), BEM, Lifeboat Coxswain, was a native of the Isles of Scilly. He served with the Royal Air Force in the air sea rescue boats during the World War II. After the war, a succession of jobs led him to find a career in fishing. Second coxswain of St Mary's lifeboat since 1950, he was appointed as Coxswain on 1 July 1956, succeeding his father.

Lethbridge served St Mary's lifeboat as coxswain for 29 years, during which time he was awarded the RNLI Silver Medal three times:

- For the rescue of 19 from the yacht Braemar, including an ITN television news crew, sent to cover the return of Francis Chichester aboard Gypsy Moth IV, 1967.
- For the rescue of 10 people from the Swedish motor vessel Nordanhav, 1970.
- For the seamanship, courage and determination in the attempt to rescue the crew of the French fishing trawler, Enfant De Bretagne, 1977.

He would also be accorded The Thanks of the Institution inscribed on Vellum four times, and received the British Empire Medal in 1975.

Other notable service included:

- SS Torrey Canyon, 1967
- Fastnet Race, 1979
- Penlee lifeboat disaster, 1981
- British Airways Helicopters Flight 5918, 1983

On a 'reluctant' visit to the London Boat Show on 11 January 1984, for the presentation of his Vellum certificate, Lethbridge was 'doorstepped' by television host Eamonn Andrews, and soon found himself the star of the TV programme This is Your Life. After nearly 40 years of service with the RNLI, Matthew Lethbridge retired on 20 January 1985. The islands' council held a party in his honour, and the entire population of St Agnes subscribed to present him with a gold watch.

== St Mary's lifeboats ==
=== Pulling and Sailing (P&S) lifeboats ===
On station	ON (Note: ON is the RNLI's Official Number of the boat.)	Name	Built	Class	Comments
1837–1839	Pre-098	Unnamed	1824	20-foot Plenty	(Note: 20 ft 0 in (6.10 m) x 6 ft 9 in (2.06 m) (6-oared) non-self-righting lifeboat, funded by the RNIPLS, built by William Plenty of Newbury, Berkshire, costing £100 when new.); Previously at Brighton.
1840–1855	Pre-108	Unnamed	1825	26-foot Plenty	(Note: 26 ft 0 in (7.92 m) x 8 ft 6 in (2.59 m) (10-oared) non-self-righting lifeboat, funded by the RNIPLS, built by William Plenty of Newbury, Berkshire, costing £100 when new.); Previously at Plymouth.
1874–1890	Pre-591	Henry Dundas	1874	37-foot Self-righting (P&S)	(Note: 37 ft 0 in (11.28 m) x 9 ft 0 in (2.74 m) (12-oared) self-righting (P&S) lifeboat, legacy of Mrs S. J. Dundas-Drummond of London, built by Woolfe of Shadwell, London, costing £438.)
1890–1891	271	Henry Dundas	1890	42-foot Self-righting (P&S)	(Note: 42 ft 0 in (12.80 m) x 11 ft 0 in (3.35 m) (12-oared) self-righting (P&S) lifeboat, legacy of Mrs S. J. Dundas-Drummond of London, built by Forrestt of Limehouse, London, costing £667.). Later renamed Tom & Jenny at Beaumaris.
1891–1899	313	Henry Dundas	1891	38-foot Self-righting (P&S)	(Note: 38 ft 0 in (11.58 m) x 8 ft 0 in (2.44 m) (12-oared) self-righting (P&S) lifeboat, legacy of Mrs S. J. Dundas-Drummond of London, built by Woolfe of Shadwell, London, costing £609.)
1899–1919	434	Henry Dundas	1899	38-foot Watson (P&S)	(Note: 38 ft 0 in (11.58 m) x 9 ft 4 in (2.84 m) (12-oared) Watson-class non-self-righting (P&S) lifeboat, legacy of Mrs S. J. Dundas-Drummond of London, built by Thames Ironworks of Blackwall, London, costing £856.); Later at Angle.

Pre ON numbers are unofficial numbers used by the Lifeboat Enthusiasts' Society to reference early lifeboats not included on the official RNLI list.

=== Motor lifeboats ===
On station	ON	Op. No. (Note: Op. No. is the RNLI's Operational Number of the boat carried on the hull.)	Name	Built	Class	Comments
1919–1930	648	—	Elsie	1919	45-foot Watson	45 ft (14 m) long and 12 ft 6 in (3.81 m) wide with a 60 BHP Tylor motor and Gardner reverse gear, giving a speed of 8 knots (9.2 mph; 15 km/h).
1930–1953	728	—	Cunard	1930	45-foot 6in Watson	45 ft 6 in (13.87 m) motor lifeboat. Given by the Cunard Steamship Company. Two 40 hp engines giving a speed of 8.25 knots (9.49 mph; 15.28 km/h). Cost £8,500 (equivalent to £480,400 in 2025).
1955–1981	926	—	Guy and Clare Hunter	1954	46-foot 9in Watson	Last slipway launched boat. 46 ft 9 in (14.25 m) long, speed 8 knots (9.2 mph; 15 km/h). Cost £32,000 (equivalent to £727,700 in 2025).
1981–1997	1073	52-18	Robert Edgar	1981	Arun	Sold in 2002 for use as a training boat in New Zealand.
1997–	1229	17-11	The Whiteheads	1997	Severn	

== See also ==
- St Agnes Lifeboat Station (Isles of Scilly)
- List of RNLI stations
- List of former RNLI stations
- Royal National Lifeboat Institution lifeboats
