= Calshot Castle =

Artillery fort in Hampshire, England

- Calshot Spit, Hampshire
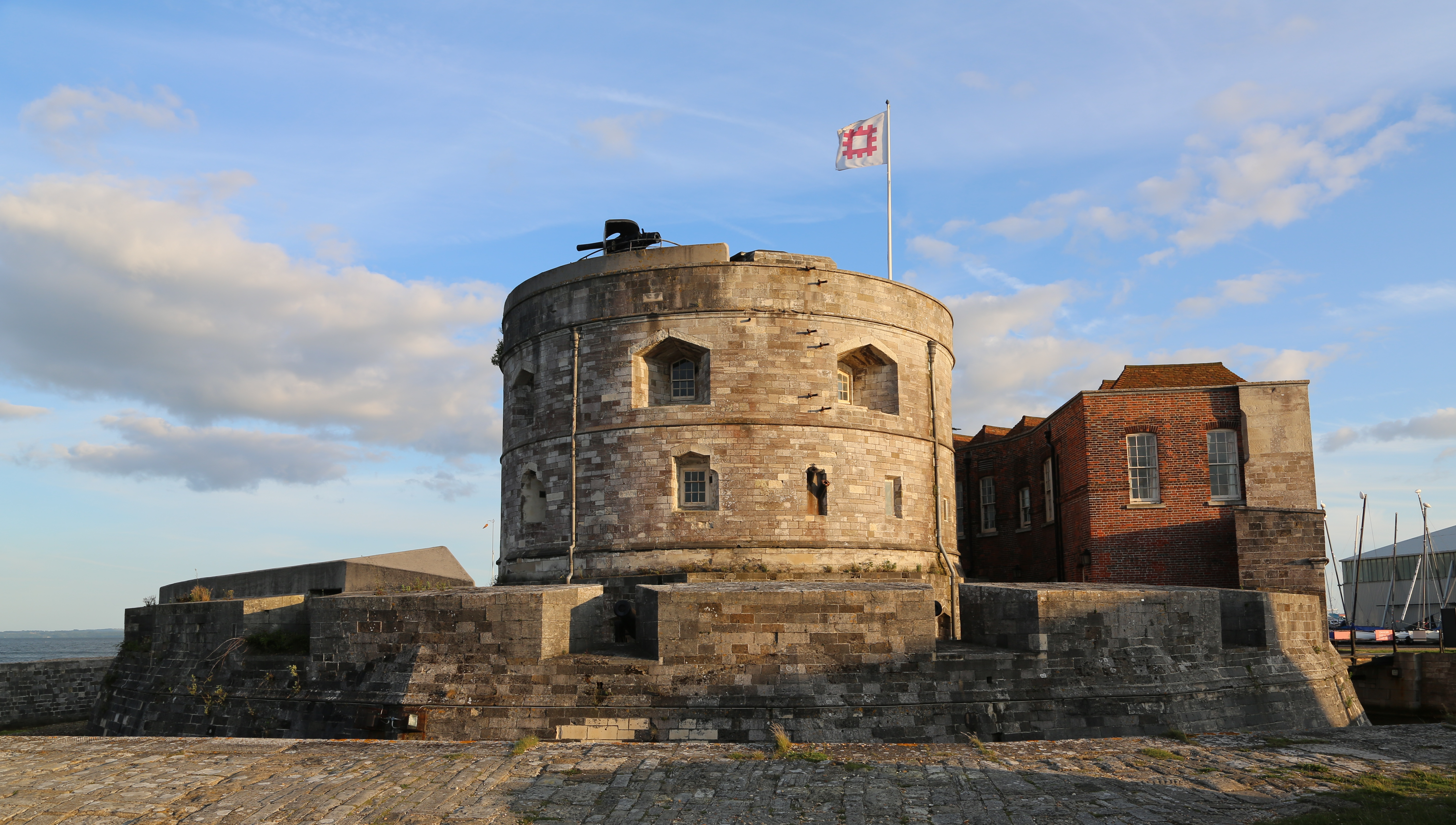
- Calshot Castle

Site information
- Type: Device Fort
- Owner: Hampshire County Council
- Controlled by: English Heritage

Scheduled monument
- Official name: Calshot Castle: a 16th century artillery castle
- Designated: 31 December 1987
- Reference no.: 1014619
- Open to the public: Yes

Location
- Calshot Castle, shown within Hampshire
- Coordinates: 50°49′12″N 1°18′27″W

Site history
- Materials: Portland stone

Calshot Castle is an artillery fort constructed by Henry VIII on the Calshot Spit, Hampshire, England, between 1539 and 1540. It formed part of the King's Device programme to protect against invasion from France and the Holy Roman Empire and defend Southampton Water as it met the Solent. The castle had a keep at its centre, surrounded by a curtain wall and a moat. Initially heavily armed, it had a garrison of 16 men and as many as 36 artillery guns. The castle continued in use for many years, surviving the English Civil War intact and being extensively modernised in the 1770s. During the 19th century, Calshot Castle was used by the coastguard as a base for combating smuggling. In 1894, however, fresh fears of a French invasion led to it being brought back into use as an artillery fort: a large coastal battery was constructed alongside the older castle and a boom built across Southampton Water, controlled from the castle.

During the First World War, Calshot Castle was primarily used as a base for seaplanes, deployed on anti-submarine patrols in the English Channel; its guns were removed before the end of the war, probably for use in France. The air base, by then called RAF Calshot, grew in size during the inter-war years, hosting the Schneider Trophy air races. With the outbreak of the Second World War, Calshot was re-armed in the face of a possible German invasion. The station continued in use after the war, but as military seaplanes became obsolete, it was finally closed in 1961. After a short period of use by the coastguard, the castle was opened to the public by English Heritage in the 1980s. Restored to its pre-1914 appearance, the castle received 5,751 visitors in 2010. Historic England considers Calshot a "well-preserved example" of King Henry's Device Forts.

== History ==
=== 16th century ===
==== Construction ====
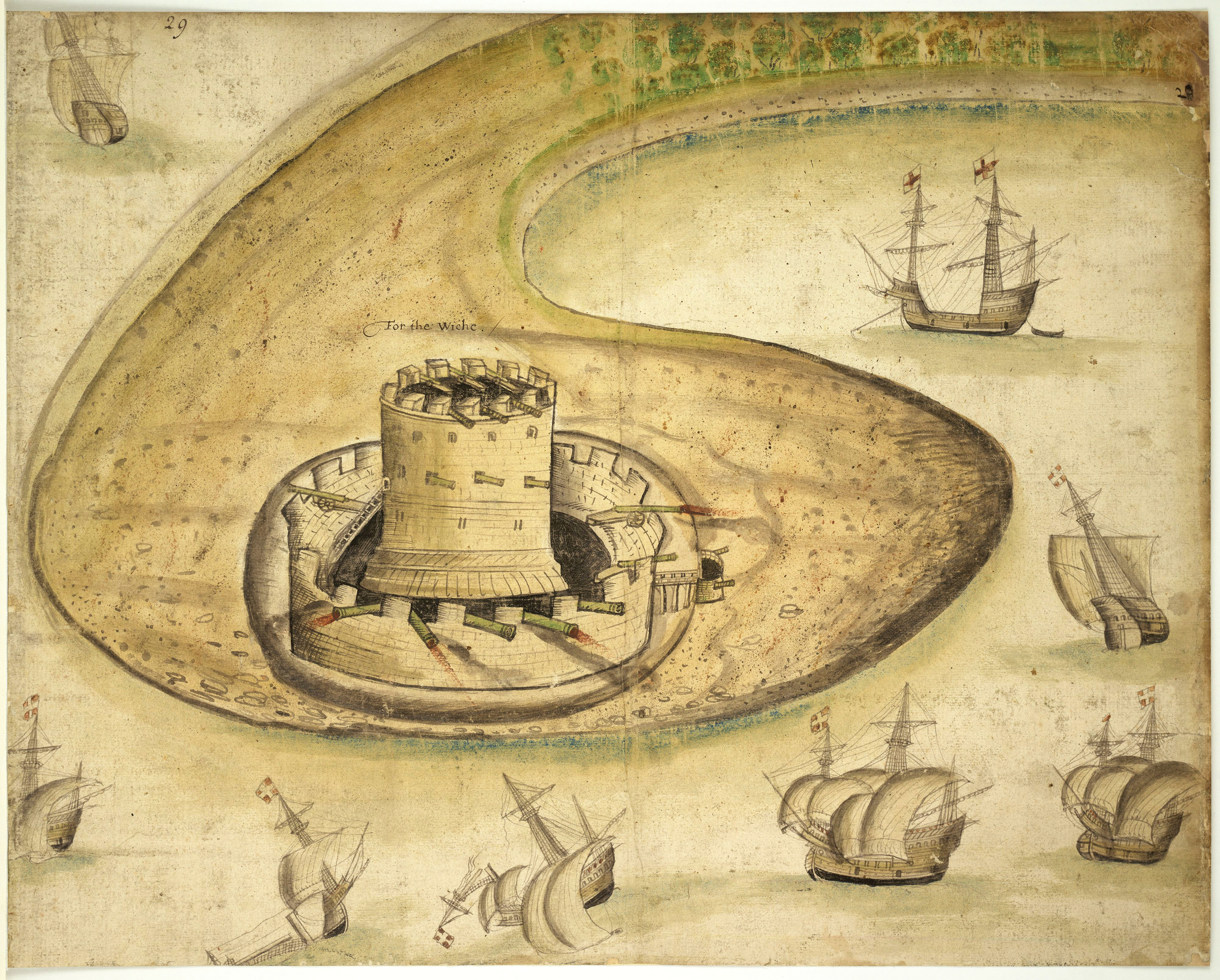
A 1539 depiction of the castle

Calshot Castle was built as a consequence of international tensions between England, France and the Holy Roman Empire in the final years of the reign of King Henry VIII. Traditionally the Crown had left coastal defences to local lords and communities, only taking a modest role in building and maintaining fortifications, and while France and the Empire remained in conflict, maritime raids were common but an actual invasion of England seemed unlikely. Modest defences based around simple blockhouses and towers existed in the south-west and along the Sussex coast, with a few more impressive works in the north of England, but in general the fortifications were limited in scale.

In 1533, Henry broke with Pope Paul III over the annulment of his long-standing marriage to Catherine of Aragon. Catherine was the aunt of Charles V, the Holy Roman Emperor, who took the annulment as a personal insult. This resulted in France and the Empire declaring an alliance against Henry in 1538, and the Pope encouraging the two countries to attack England. An invasion of England appeared certain. In response, Henry issued an order, called a "device", in 1539, giving instructions for the "defence of the realm in time of invasion" and the construction of forts along the English coastline.

Calshot Castle was designed to protect the Solent, a body of water that led from the English Channel to the naval base at Portsmouth and, through Southampton Water, to the important port of Southampton. The castle was one of four forts that William Fitzwilliam, the Lord High Admiral, and William Paulet decided to build to improve the defences along the Solent; the others were at East and West Cowes, and Hurst. Calshot was constructed on the narrow Calshot Spit, overlooking the deep-water channel running through into Southampton. Temporary earthwork defences and gun batteries were erected as an interim measure, but the castle itself was built quickly and finished by the end of 1540. It probably reused stone and lead from Bealieu and Netley abbeys, which had recently been closed during the Dissolution of the Monasteries.

The castle initially had a garrison of eight gunners, five soldiers and a lieutenant, under the command of a captain. In the late 1540s, it was heavily armed by the standards of the time, with 36 pieces of artillery. In the 1580s, the castle caught fire and the timber needed for the repairs required 127 trees to be sent from the New Forest. The work was carried out in 1584, prompted by the threat of a Spanish invasion, but by that time its garrison had shrunk to eight men.

=== 17th–19th centuries ===
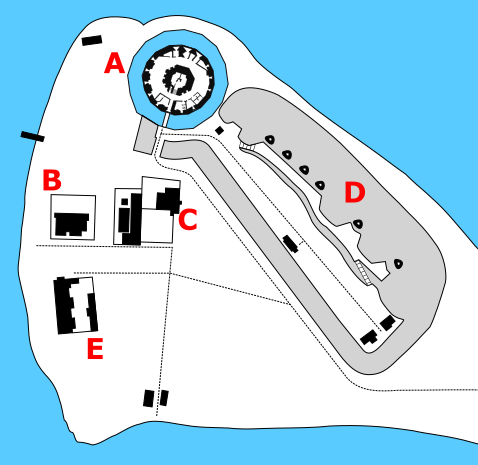
Diagram of the castle and gun battery, depicted in 1901. Key: A – 16th-century castle and adjacent boom; B – Castle Yacht Club; C – officer's mess; D – 1895 gun battery; E – coastguard station

In the early 1600s, England was at peace with France and Spain and coastal defences received little attention. During the English Civil War of the 1640s, Calshot was held by Parliamentary forces against King Charles I, and protected with a 15-strong garrison at an annual cost of £107. (Note: Comparing early modern costs and prices with those of the modern period is challenging. £107 in 1642 could be equivalent to between £17,000 and £4.5 million in 2014, depending on the price comparison used.) Parliament considered the fortress important and kept it supplied with ammunition; unlike several other local forts, Parliament kept the castle operational, probably because of its ongoing role in defending Southampton Water. During the early 18th-century War of Spanish Succession it was equipped with up to 25 guns.

The castle was modernised in the 1770s with a new parapet around the central keep, alterations to the gun embrasures around the outer wall and an expansion of the gatehouse with an additional set of rooms for the castle's captain. Reports in 1793, however, showed the castle's guns to be in a poor condition and complained that the fortification was under the command of an infirm, elderly master-gunner. Improvements were probably made at the start of the Revolutionary Wars that year, but in 1809 the geographer James Playfair described the castle as merely "a blockhouse with a garrison". In 1804, the castle was used to store munitions for the Sea Fencibles, fishing boats used as volunteer naval vessels to counter the threat of a French invasion. Seven guns were added to the castle's arsenal to protect against French attack.

With the end of the Napoleonic Wars in 1815, the government coastguard took control of the castle, using it as a base to combat smuggling, taking advantage of the water behind the Calshot Spit as a good location to position their waiting interception vessels. By the middle of the century, two officers and forty-two men were stationed there. By the 1850s, there was renewed military interest in the site, and several proposals were made to redevelop it to mount as many 32 artillery guns; the plans were not taken forward, and it was noted that the presence of the 16th-century stone keep would create dangerous splinters in the event of any enemy artillery fire landing there. In 1887, the Castle Yacht Club was established just beside the castle along the spit.

During the 1880s, concerns were raised that Southampton might be vulnerable to French attack using small ships armed with torpedoes. As a result, in 1894 the War Office took the castle back from the coastguard, building a boom across Southampton Water which was moved using three gunboats. The 16th-century castle was too small to host a gun battery to protect the boom, so a larger battery was built south of the old castle in 1895, armed with two 4.7-inch (120 mm) and four 12-pounder (5.4 kg) quick-firing guns, supported by three searchlights mounted on the older castle walls. The boom was managed from two towers called "dolphins", one just beside the castle and the other on the far side of the water, each with two 12-pounder quick-firing guns of their own, in turn supported by machine guns. The creation of these defences ultimately forced the nearby yacht club to move to the southern end of the spit.

=== 1900–45 ===
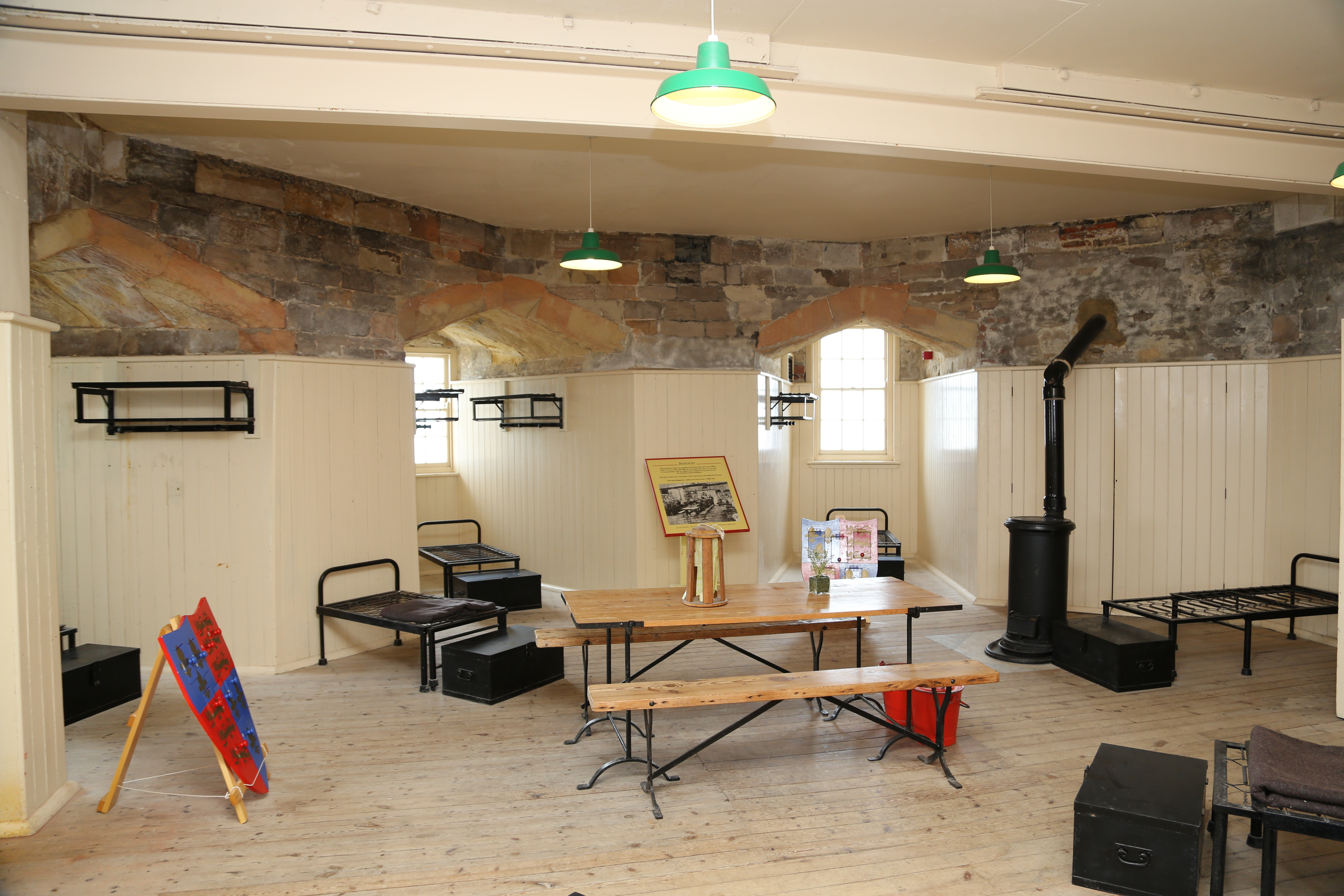
The first-floor barracks in the keep, restored to their 1910 appearance

In the first years of the 20th century, Calshot Castle's defensive role continued unchanged. The castle's keep was redesigned in 1907 to allow it to house two of the castle's quick-firing guns on its roof. A new, lighter "ladder" boom across Southampton Water was installed in 1907, but within two years this approach had been replaced by a plan to block Southampton Water with a boom made up of floating hulks. A 1910 plan proposed that the castle would be garrisoned in wartime by 10 officers and 154 men, 75 of whom would have to be housed nearby rather than in the fort itself; additional naval personnel would also have been needed to man the support vessels for the boom. A Royal Naval Air Station was built alongside the castle in 1913 to house twelve experimental seaplanes which were intended to support the Royal Naval fleet operating along the Channel. Calshot was particularly suitable for seaplanes, as the surrounding waters and coastline were relatively quiet and calm.

The First World War broke out in 1914, when military opinions on the utility of Calshot Castle had shifted considerably. The decision was taken to rely primarily on gun batteries at the two entrances to the Solent, rather than at Calshot and Southampton Water. At the start of conflict the boom was removed and replaced by anti-submarine nets further up the coast' two of Calshot's guns were removed the following year to protect the new nets. The airbase was used for training purposes until 1916, when it took on anti-submarine patrols over the Channel, where the German raids had started to inflict critical damage. Almost 3,500 hours were flown by aircraft from Calshot that year, with over 3,500 being flown in 1917 and over 9,000 in just three months of 1918. Subordinate air stations were created in Bembridge, Newhaven, Polegate and Portland. A cabin was built on top of the keep to oversee air operations, the Castle Yacht Club was taken over for use as the officers' mess and the air station spread out across Calshot Spit, including occupying the 1895 battery. Calshot's remaining guns were removed and probably dispatched to the front line in France.

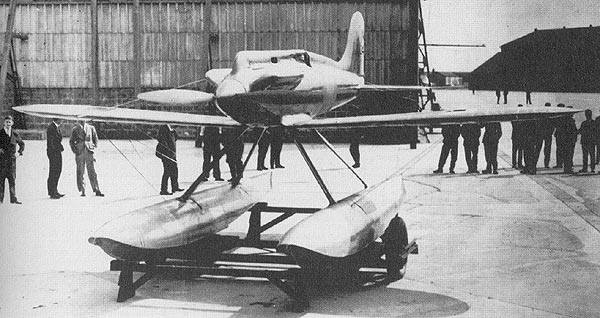
Gloster VI seaplane N249, at RAF Calshot in preparation for the 1929 Schneider Trophy race

During the inter-war years Calshot was taken over by the Royal Air Force, becoming RAF Calshot. It was used as the School for Naval Co-operation and Aerial Navigation from 1918 onwards and began housing the Seaplane Training Squadron in 1931. The 1895 battery was demolished to create additional space for the growing station, and a narrow-gauge railway constructed along the spit. Parts of the castle moat were concreted over to provide parking for planes. Calshot twice hosted the Schneider Trophy air races over the Solent, the last two in the sequence of popular international events designed to encourage the development of new, high-speed technology. The Empire Air Day events were also held at Calshot, attracting 1,000 visitors in 1935.

During the Second World War, Calshot Castle was initially defended by troops from the Hampshire Regiment, and a barge equipped with two 3-inch (76 mm) anti-aircraft guns and a 40-millimetre (1.6 in) Bofors gun. Air-raid shelters were constructed in the castle's moat, with five boats from the base taking part in the Dunkirk evacuation. The threat of German invasion increased, however, and the defences were expanded in 1940, with two 12-pounder quick firing guns placed on the keep's roof, supported by searchlights. Two additional subordinate batteries, Bungalow and Stonepoint, were built the following year on the other side of Southampton Water and further south-west along the coast. The castle was not damaged during the war and by 1943 was placed on a "care and maintenance" basis, acting as a way station for passing aircraft.

=== 1945–21st century ===
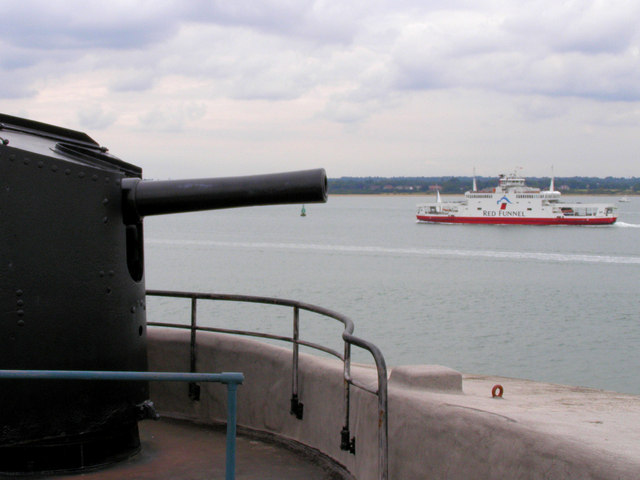
A 12-pounder (5.4 kg) quick-firing gun on the keep's roof, overlooking Southampton Water

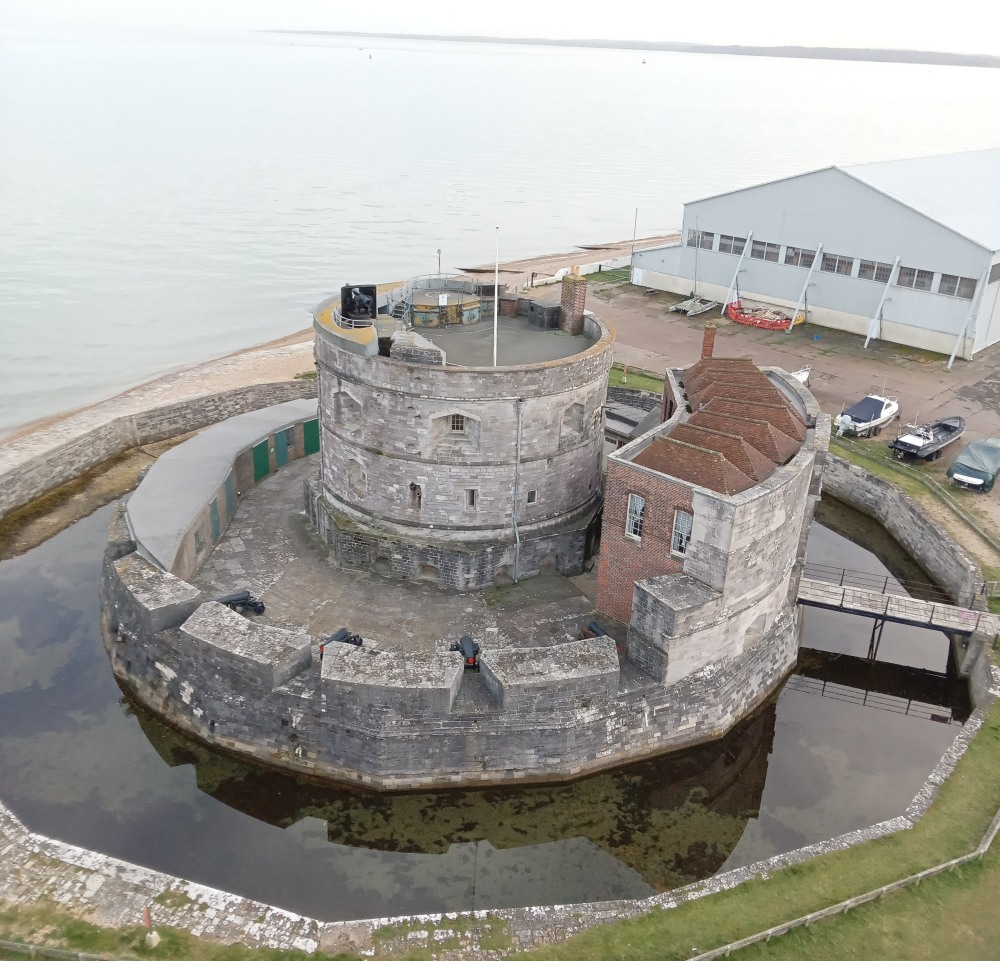
Calshot Castle viewed from Calshot Tower

After the war, Calshot returned to duty as an active air base, housing two squadrons of Sunderland flying boats which took part in the Berlin airlift of 1948, before being passed across to Maintenance Command in 1953. The Southampton Harbour Board built a coastguard lookout tower at the castle in 1952, and the following year they began to construct a signal station tower on top of the keep, complete with radar and radio facilities, which opened in 1958. By then, military seaplanes had become obsolete, and the RAF station was finally closed in 1961.

Hampshire County Council leased the site from the Crown Estates in 1964; the castle itself passed into the guardianship of the state, and the hangars were used as an activity centre. A Royal National Lifeboat Institution station opened in 1971 alongside the castle, with a 130-foot (40 m)-tall replacement coastguard tower constructed two years later.

English Heritage took over management of the castle in 1983, and stripped back 20th-century additions to present it as it might have appeared in 1914, including demolishing the old signal station tower. The site remains open to visitors and received 5,751 visitors in 2010. The castle is protected under UK law as a Grade II* listed building and as a scheduled monument, but its coastal position means it is at risk from erosion or changing sea levels caused by climate change. The air station's former hangars are still used as a recreation centre by Hampshire County Council.

== Architecture ==
Calshot Castle is a three-storey, circular fortification, comprising a keep, gatehouse and curtain wall, predominantly constructed of ashlar Portland stone. When first built in the 16th century, it was designed to carry three tiers of artillery: two positioned on the second floor and the roof of the central keep, and the third in the outer curtain wall. Additional guns could have been placed on the roof of the gatehouse and on the first floor of the keep. Historic England considers it to form a "well preserved example" of the Device Forts.

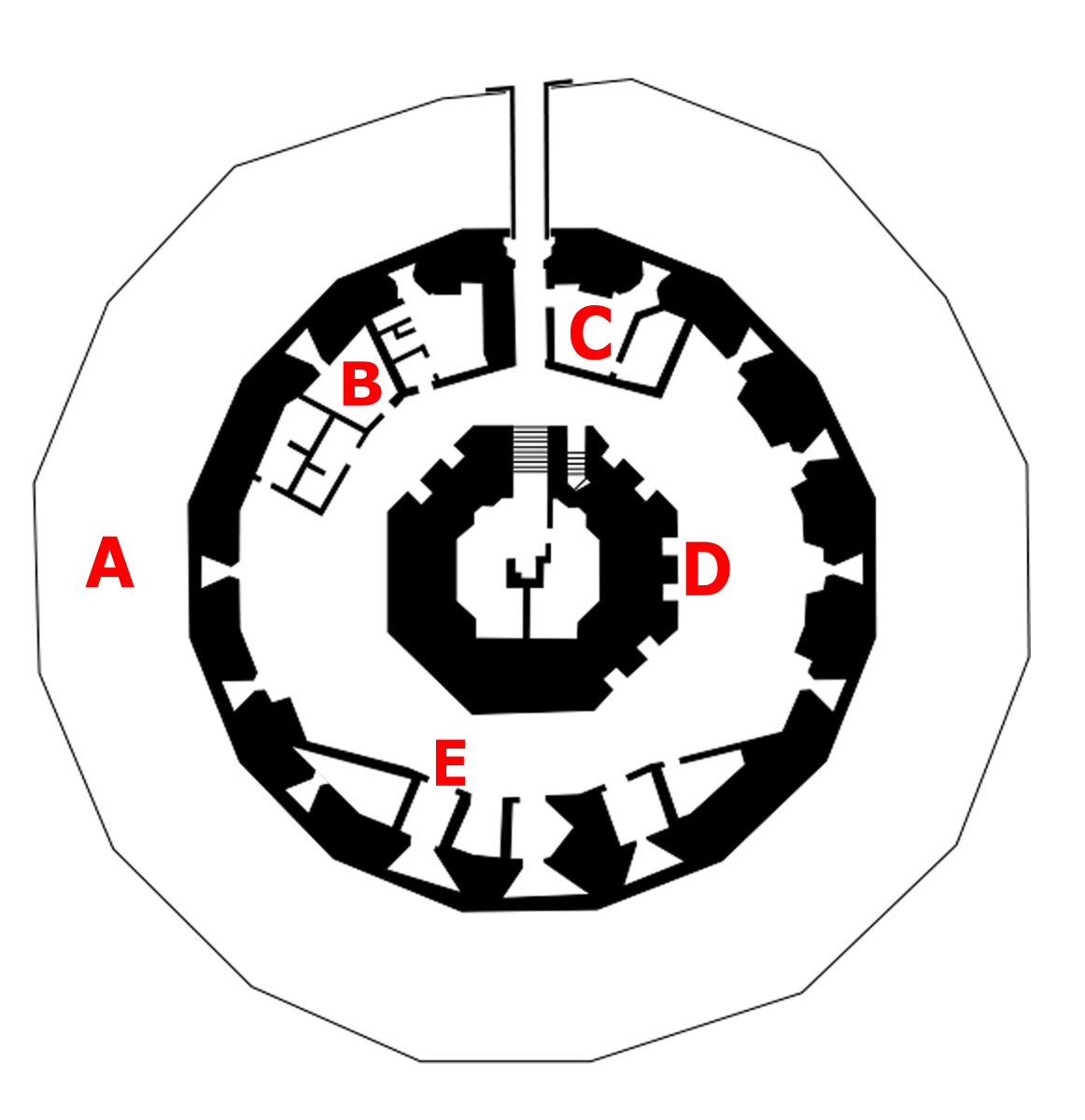
Plan of the castle in the 21st century: A – moat; B – cookhouse; C – gatehouse range; D – keep; E – searchlight emplacement

The castle is surrounded by a water-filled, 16-sided moat, 8.8 metres (29 ft) across, accessed over a 20th-century bridge into the gatehouse, an 18th-century design based on a simpler 16th-century original. The gatehouse was altered in 1896, with the addition of brick-built ancillary buildings to the southern end. It was probably intended to provide additional living space for the garrison. The gatehouse leads into what was originally a 16-sided courtyard with 15 gun embrasures round the curtain wall. The wall was lowered to its current height in the 1770s and a concrete building to house searchlights, dating from 1896, now stretches along the southern end of the castle.

In the centre of the castle is the keep, which has an external diameter of 16 metres (52 ft), an octagonal lower storey and circular walls on the upper levels. Originally this held accommodation for the captain and the garrison, but it was heavily redeveloped in the 19th and 20th centuries. Its exterior walls have eight recesses at ground level, originally used to store ammunition for the castle's guns. The basement of the keep was redesigned in the 1890s, when electrical generators were installed, protected by a new, thicker, concrete ceiling. It may originally have been vaulted in stone in a similar style to nearby Hurst Castle.

The first floor of the keep has been restored to its early 20th-century appearance as a barracks room. The second floor was redeveloped in the late 19th century to form another barracks room, with its ceiling incorporating additional early 20th-century girders and concrete to support the gun battery above it. The roof of the keep has two 12-pounder gun mounts with their original gun-lockers; there is a 12-pounder gun on display originally used on a Royal Naval vessel. The keep's roof would originally have been flat, with crenellations for artillery, but both the roof and crenellations were removed in the 1770s.

== See also ==
- Governor of Calshot Castle
- Castles in Great Britain and Ireland

== Bibliography ==
- Chapple, Nick (2014). "A History of the National Collection: Volume Seven, 1953–1970". Research Report Series. London, UK: English Heritage. ISSN 2046-9799.
- Coad, Jonathan (2006). "Calshot Castle: The Later History of a Tudor Fortress, 1793–1945". The English Heritage Historical Review. 1: 103–113. doi:10.1179/175201606797188516.
- Coad, Jonathan (2013). Calshot Castle: Hampshire (revised ed.). London, UK: English Heritage. ISBN 9781850741022.
- Godwin, George Nelson (1904). The Civil War in Hampshire (1642–45) and the Story of Basing House. Southampton, UK: Henry March Gilbert and Son. OCLC 4237451.
- Hale, J. R. (1983). Renaissance War Studies. London, UK: Hambledon Press. ISBN 0907628176.
- Harrington, Peter (2007). The Castles of Henry VIII. Oxford, UK: Osprey Publishing. ISBN 9781472803801.
- King, D. J. Cathcart (1991). The Castle in England and Wales: An Interpretative History. London, UK: Routledge Press. ISBN 9780415003506.
- Morley, B. M. (1976). Henry VIII and the Development of Coastal Defence. London, UK: Her Majesty's Stationery Office. ISBN 0116707771.
- Playfair, James (1809). A System of Geography, Volume II. Edinburgh, UK: Peter Hill. OCLC 239535045.
- Saunders, Andrew (1989). Fortress Britain: Artillery Fortifications in the British Isles and Ireland. Liphook, UK: Beaufort. ISBN 1855120003.
- Sutherland, Jonathon; Canwell, Dianne (2010). The RAF Air Sea Rescue Service, 1918–1986. Barnsley, UK: Pen and Sword. ISBN 9781848843035.
- Thompson, M. W. (1987). The Decline of the Castle. Cambridge, UK: Cambridge University Press. ISBN 1854226088.
- Walton, Steven A. (2010). "State Building Through Building for the State: Foreign and Domestic Expertise in Tudor Fortification". Osiris. 25 (1): 66–84. doi:10.1086/657263. S2CID 144384757.
