= Calshot Spit =

Shingle bank in Hampshire, England

Coordinates: 50.816272°N 1.306495°W

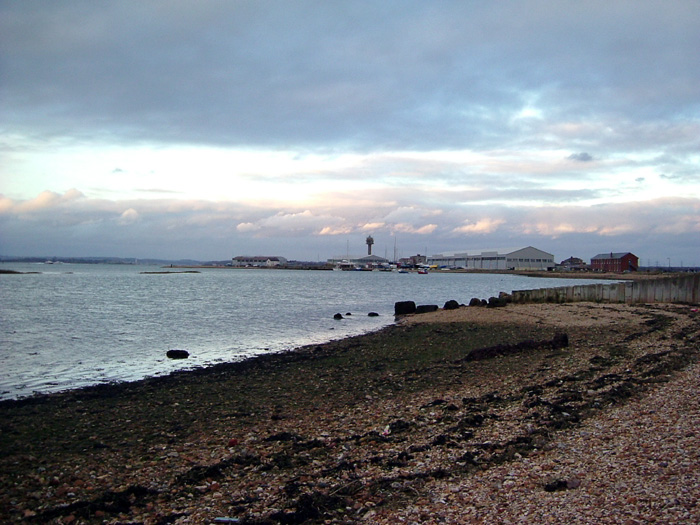
Calshot Spit

Calshot Spit is a one-mile long sand and shingle bank, near the village of Calshot, located on the southern bank of the open end of Southampton Water, on the south coast of England.

At the end of the spit are Calshot Castle (built by King Henry VIII), an RNLI lifeboat, an NCI station, several slipways, a former Royal Navy and Royal Air Force flying boat station and Calshot Activities Centre. The neck of the spit is owned by New Forest District Council while the end of the spit is owned by the Crown Estate which leases it to Hampshire County Council.

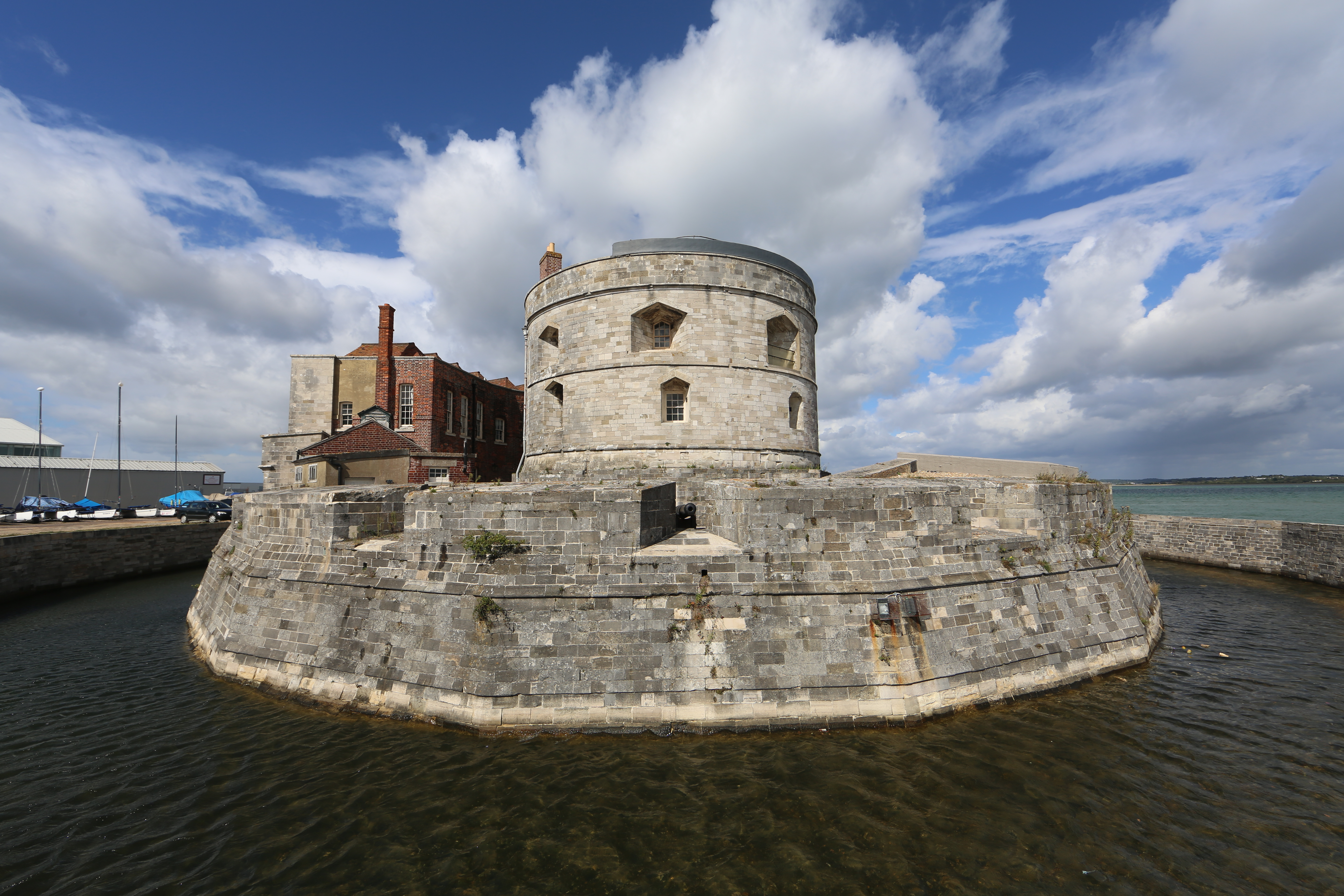
Calshot Castle

== History ==
The castle is a low, circular, stone structure and was armed with large muzzle-loading guns. Its purpose, when it was built in 1539, was to protect access to the important harbour at Southampton from seaborne attack, by France or Spain from the English Channel via the Solent.

For much of its history the spit was low lying and parts of it often underwater at high tide. This changed in 1703 when the great storm of that year washed enough shingle onto the spit to make it a more substantial structure.

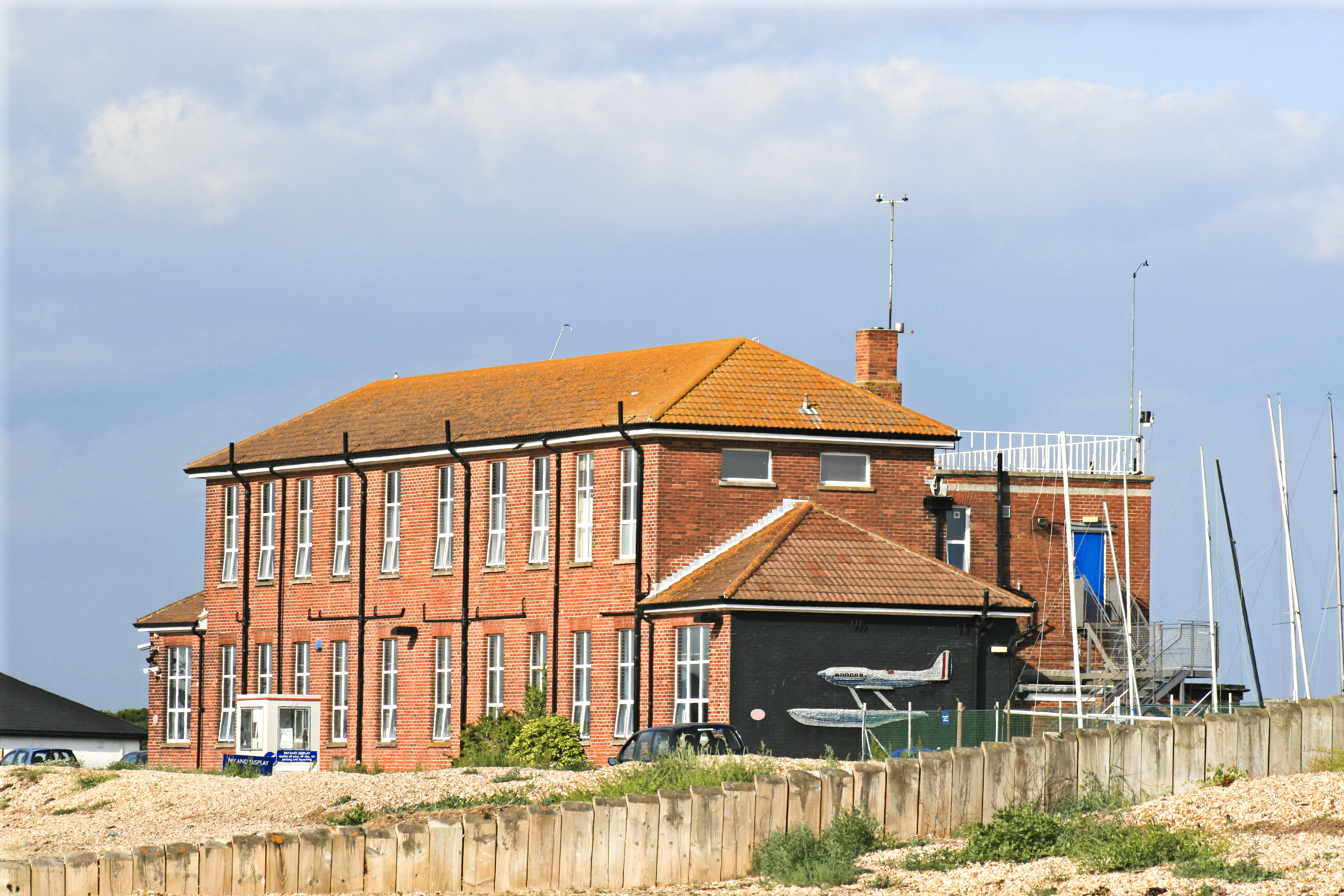
Houston House, the former officer's mess at RAF Calshot.

Calshot Naval Air Station was originally set up in 1913. Its choice as a location for operating flying boats is clear: the landing area is sheltered by land on the three sides of Southampton Water and by the Isle of Wight, several miles away, on the fourth side. As part of the expansion of the site in 1916 the contractor. Henry Boot & Son (Westminster), built a narrow gauge railway in order to move materials. It was transferred to the air-force in 1919 and ran (with a number of branches) from Eaglehurst camp to north pier at the end of the spit.

In 1929 and 1931, Calshot was the venue for the Schneider Trophy, an international air race for seaplanes.

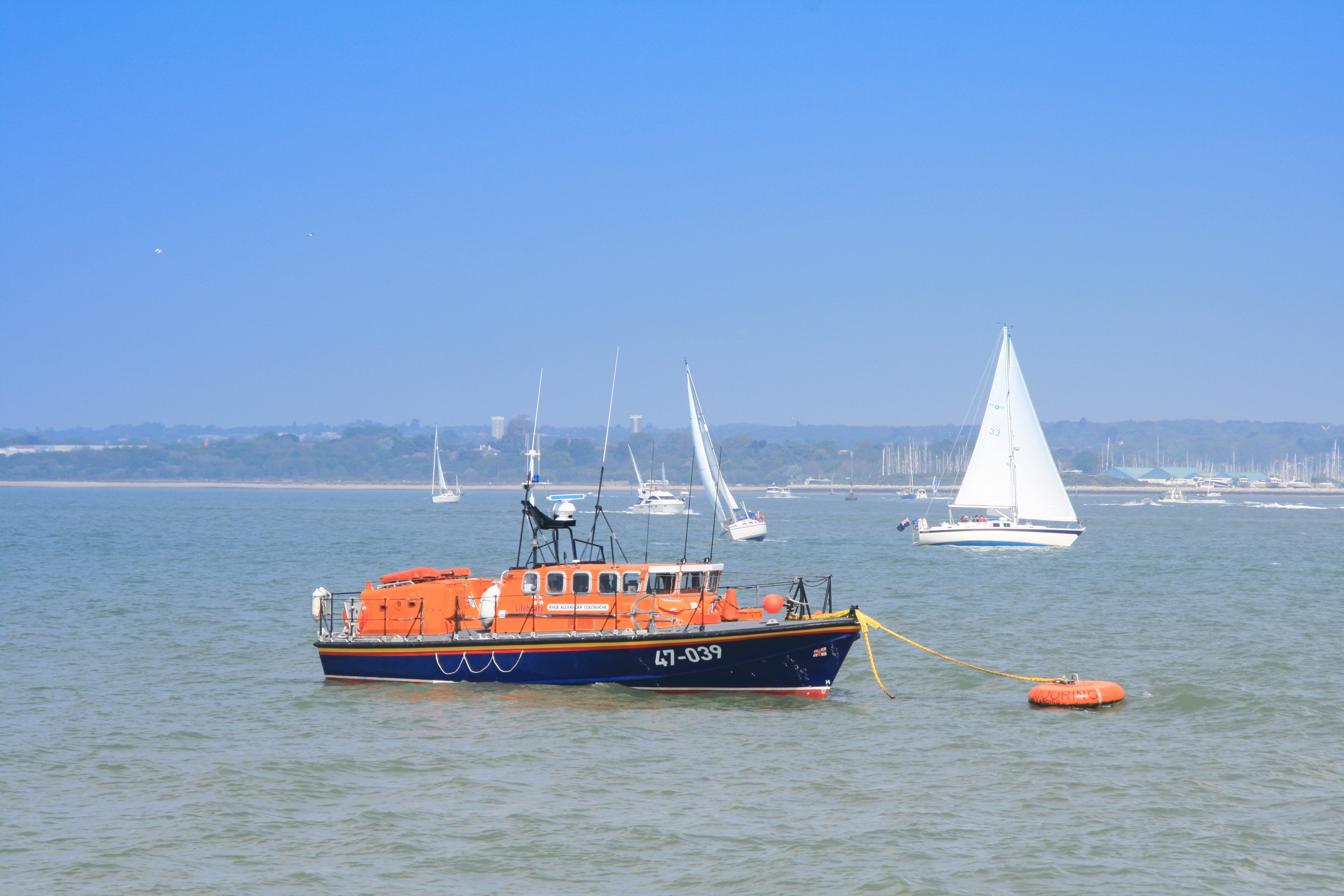
RNLI Tyne class lifeboat at Calshot Spit mooring

The railway closed at the end of World War Two when it was found that the wagons had decayed to the point where they were no longer safe to use. One locomotive survives from the railway as Douglas on the Talyllyn Railway.

The Spit was transferred to civilian control at the start of the 1960s. A Coastguard tower was added to the end of the spit in 1973. The Coastguard stopped using the castle in 1990.

The site is now the location of Calshot Lifeboat Station operated by the RNLI, yachts and the National Coastwatch Institution. The hangars are home to Calshot Activities Centre and house indoor climbing walls, artificial ski slopes and a velodrome. In 2005 new public toilets were installed in the spit with a design partially inspired by the spit's beach huts. In 2025 part of the film The Last House was shot at the spit.

== Shipping ==
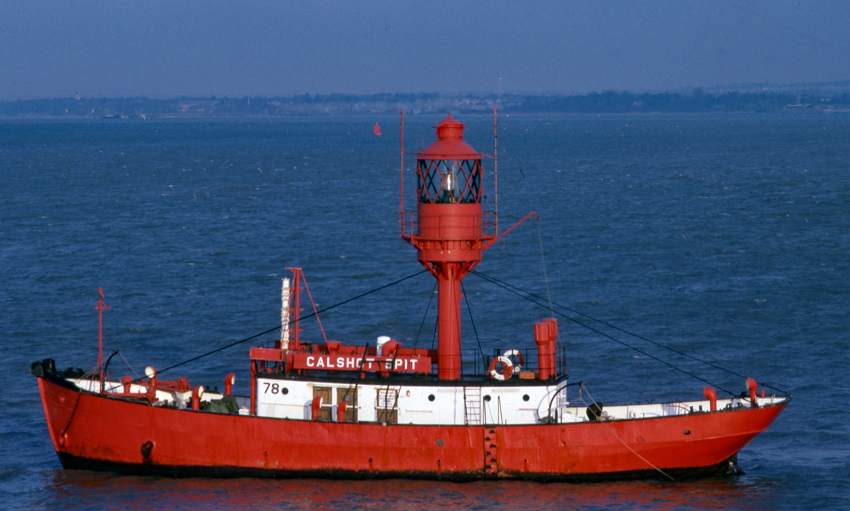
LV 78 Calshot Spit

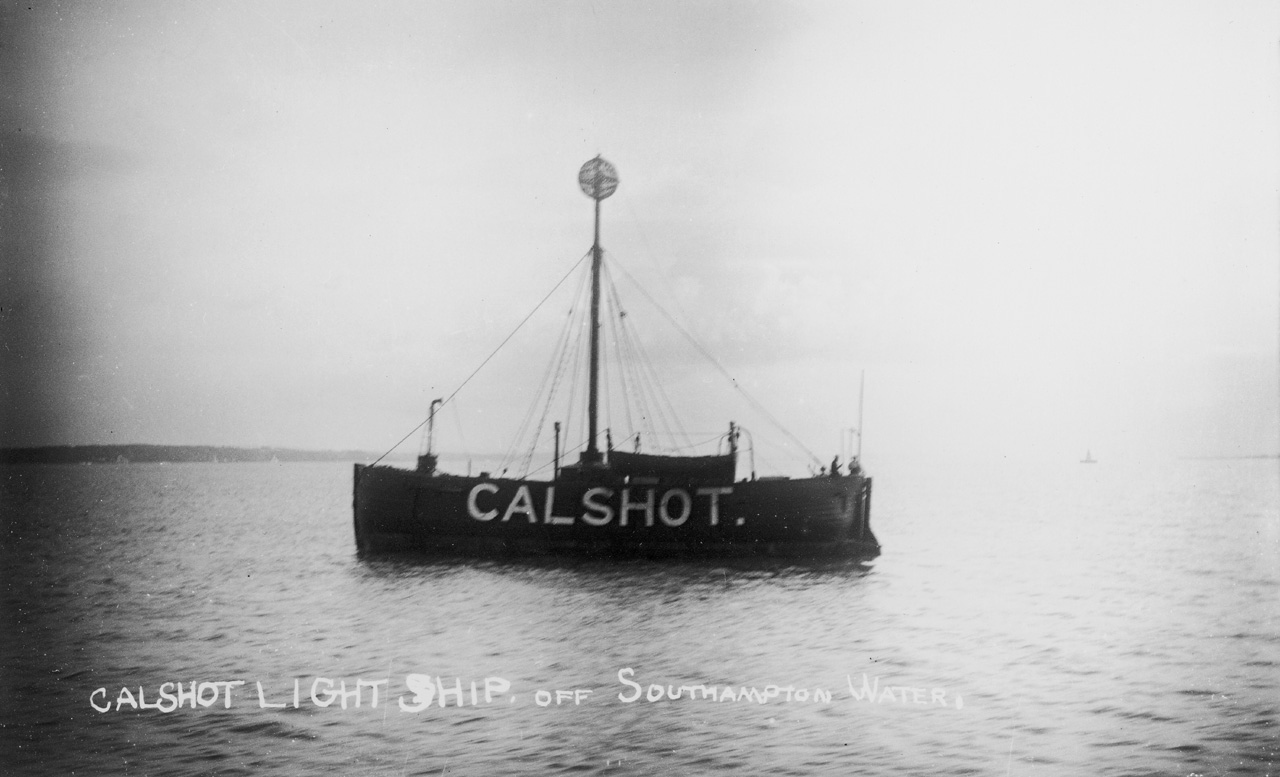
An early Calshot Lightship in 1906

The spit is a potential navigation hazard for ships entering Southampton Water, and vessels are guided by the Calshot Spit light float. This replaced a Trinity House lightvessel (LV 78) that was anchored off the spit and which was, for a while, a static attraction at the Ocean Village marina in Southampton. In November 2010 it was moved a short distance to the Trafalgar dock where, after renovation, it was to be displayed at the Aeronautica attraction, due to open in 2015. The plans for Aeronautica came to a halt in January 2012. In December 2019 the ship was relocated to the Solent Sky museum in order to be converted into part of the museum’s cafe. It was built in 1914 by J I Thornycroft shipyard in Southampton and decommissioned in 1978.

LV 50, which was on the Calshot station between 1943 and 1951, was bought by the Royal Northumberland Yacht Club, and remains their club ship to this day.

Personnel from RAF Calshot traveling to and from the spit would sometimes be taken on and off passing Red Funnel ferries in launches.

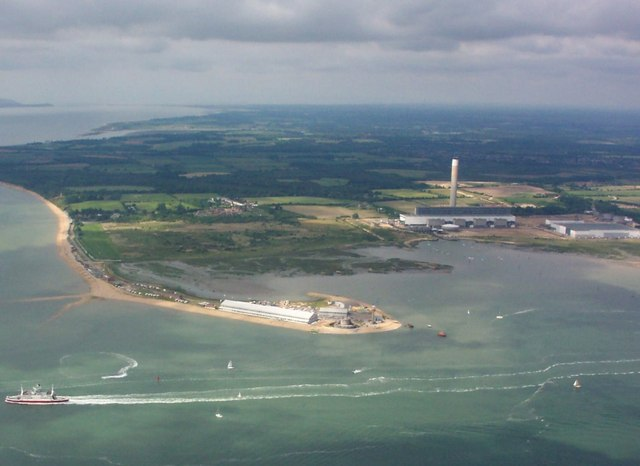
The spit viewed from the air

== Fauna and flora ==
Historically the site's status as a military base provided a degree of protection for the local flora. The large scale construction of car parks, beach-huts and the importation of topsoil has reduced the range of plants present. Crambe maritima (sea kale) still grows on the spit and in the 19th century it was apparently harvested for sale in Southampton.

== See also ==
- RNAS Calshot
- RAF Calshot
