= Newhaven Seaplane Base =

Former RAF base in East Sussex, England

Coordinates: 50.78313°N 0.06260°E

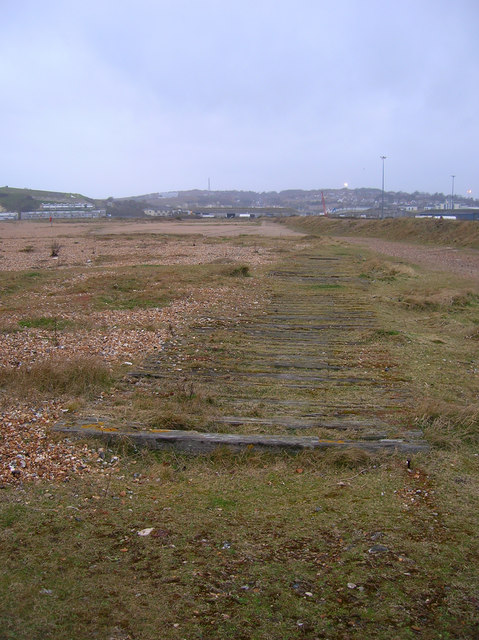
Site of RNAS Newhaven

Map showing the location of Newhaven Seaplane Base within East Sussex.

Newhaven Seaplane Base is today the derelict site of an experimental seaplane base at the head of the beach east of Newhaven Harbour, seaward of Tide Mills, East Sussex, England.

== History ==
The first formation of No. 242 Squadron RAF was on 15 August 1918 from numbers 408, 409 and 514 Flights at the seaplane station at Newhaven, Sussex. Operating from there and the nearby airfield at Telscombe Cliffs, it was equipped with Short Type 184 seaplanes and carried out anti-submarine patrols over the English Channel until the end of the First World War.

== Description of derelict site ==
Surveys carried out in 2006 have exposed part of the slipway, concrete aprons to both hangars with door tracks and several other slabs presumed to be workshops. Sussex Archaeological Society started a dig in April 2006 to catalogue the entire East Beach site.

== See also ==
- List of seaplanes and flying boats – United Kingdom
- Seaplane bases in the United Kingdom
