= RAF Calshot =

Former RAF seaplane base in England

RAF Calshot
- Near Calshot, Hampshire in England
- Aerial view, late 1920s.

Site information
- Type: RAF Seaplane and Flying boat station
- Owner: Ministry of Defence
- Operator: Royal Air Force (1918-61)

Location
- Shown within Hampshire
- Location within Hampshire Location within the United Kingdom
- Coordinates: 50.8194°N 1.3083°W

Site history
- Built: 1913
- In use: April 1918 – April 1961
- Battles/wars: First World War; Second World War

Royal Air Force Calshot or more simply RAF Calshot was initially a seaplane and flying boat station, and latterly a Royal Air Force marine craft maintenance and training unit. It was located at the end of Calshot Spit in Southampton Water, Hampshire, England, at grid reference SU487024. It was the main seaplane/flying boat development and training unit in the UK, with the landing area sheltered by the mainland, to the west, north and east, and the Isle of Wight, a few miles away to the south on the other side of the Solent, where seaplanes and flying boats were mass-produced by Saunders-Roe. It closed in 1961. Much of the former base has been preserved, with most of the site now being occupied by the Calshot Activities Centre.

== Origins ==
The station was originally established on 29 March 1913 by the Royal Flying Corps (RFC), as the Calshot Naval Air Station, for the purpose of testing seaplanes for the RFC Naval wing. The station was taken over by the Royal Naval Air Service (RNAS) during the First World War and finally became a Royal Air Force station on the merger of the RNAS and the RFC on 1 April 1918.

== 1918 to 1939 ==
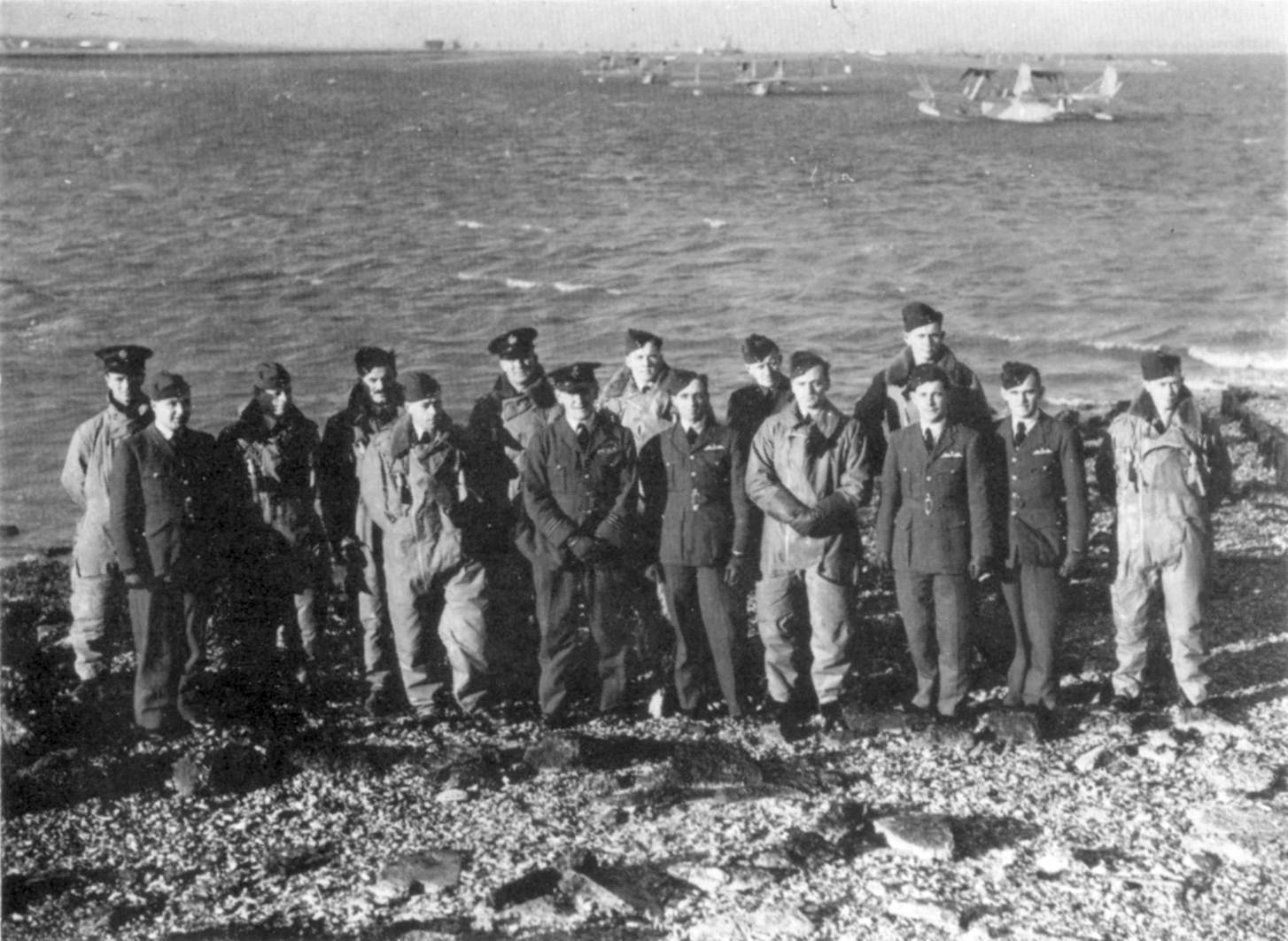
RAF personnel on the beach at Calshot, 1936.

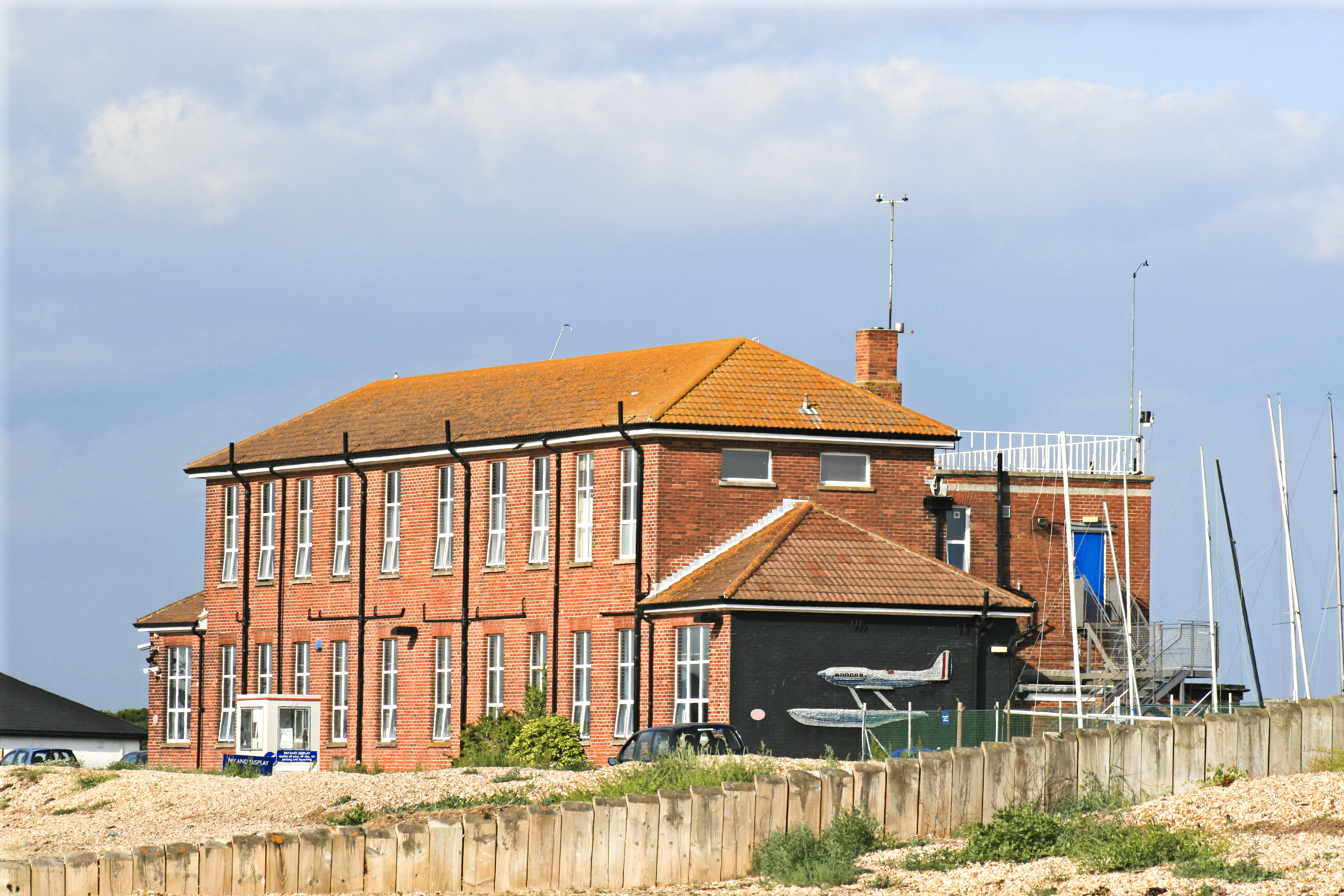
Houston House, formerly the officer's mess at RAF Calshot.

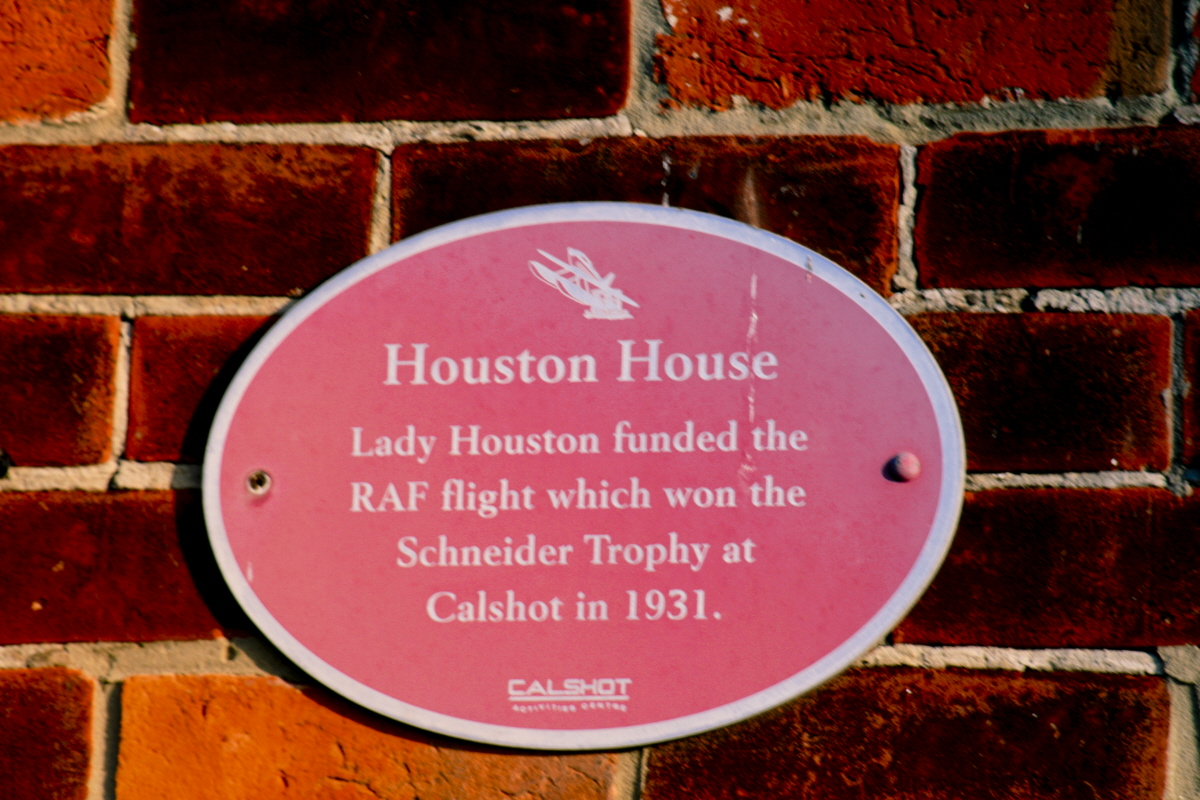
Plaque commemorating Lady Houston's funding for the 1931 RAF Schneider Trophy team.

On 8 August 1918 'A' & 'B' Boat Seaplane Training Flights was formed here within 210 Training Depot Station before being disbanded during 1919.

On the formation of the RAF, Calshot retained the two RNAS flights of Felixstowe flying boats and the flight of seaplanes, and for a short while the station became the headquarters of No. 10 Group RAF. After the war, Calshot continued its crew training and aircraft development role, and became home to the RAF School of Naval Co-operation and Aerial Navigation. The station was officially renamed as RAF Calshot on 5 February 1922.

During this time, Calshot also housed a reconnaissance flight (with Felixstowe flying boats), and a large part of the unit was designated for the training of motorboat crews and other marine craft; the boats mainly used for towing disabled aircraft, collecting bombs from practice runs, and for towing gunnery target boats.

On 24 March 1924, three serving members of the RAF took off from Calshot in a Vickers Vulture amphibious biplane on a planned round-the-world flight. The flight was beset by bad weather and several mishaps, including a crash in Akyab Harbour, Burma (requiring a replacement aircraft); and eventually a forced sea landing near Bering Island ended the attempt.

Calshot also became home for the High Speed Flight as it prepared for the Schneider Trophy competitions in 1927, 1929 and finally 1931. The 1927 competition was held in Venice and won for Britain by the Calshot team in a Supermarine S.5, giving Britain the right to host the race in 1929. Calshot was chosen as the venue and an updated S.5 aircraft covered the seven laps at an average speed of 328.63 mph to take the prize. Two years later, again at Calshot, a Supermarine S.6B won the race for Britain for the third time in a row to retain the Trophy outright.

"Aircraftsman Shaw", also known as T. E. Lawrence, or Lawrence of Arabia, was detached to Calshot to help with the 1929 Schneider races. While there he was seconded to the nearby British Power Boat Company factory, where he worked with Hubert Scott-Paine in the development of the 200 Class Seaplane Tender, at the time claimed to be the fastest craft of their size in the world.

Through the 1930s, Calshot continued its development and training role, and included:

- Navigation School (until 6 January 1936),
- 201 Sqn – re-formed on 1 January 1929 with Supermarine Southampton flying boats, and later with Saro Londons,
- Seaplane Training Sqn (STC) – re-formed on 1 October 1931,
- 240 Sqn – re-formed on 30 March 1937 from C Flight of the STC, initially equipped with Supermarine Scapas, then Short Singapores, and (by July 1939) with Saro Londons,
- Flying Boat Training Sqn – re-formed on 2 January 1939.

== Second World War ==
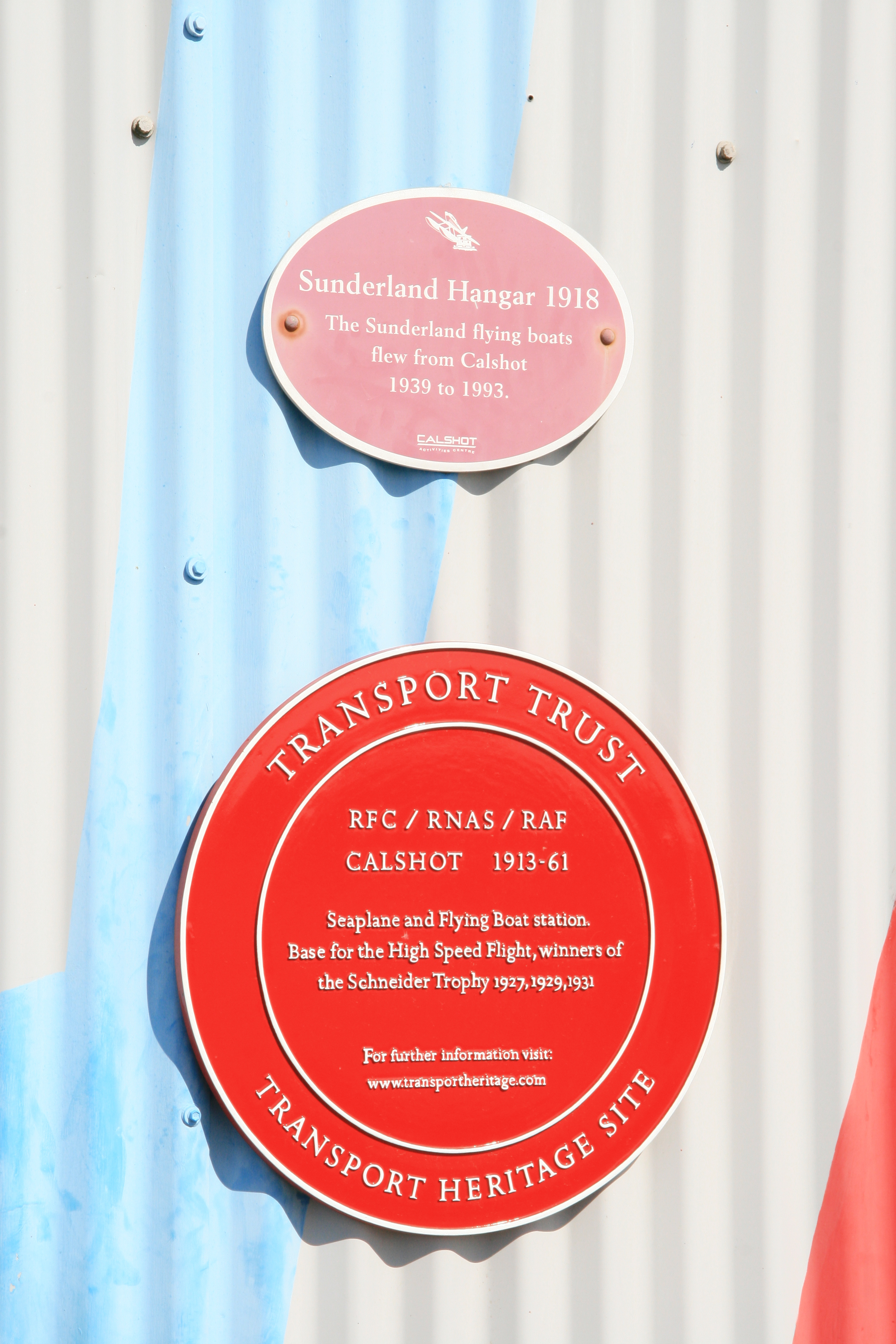
Transport Heritage Site plaque on the former Sunderland flying boat hangar, now used to house climbing walls and a velodrome.

Just before the outbreak of World War II, the two operational squadrons left Calshot: 201 Sqn to Pembroke Dock and 240 Sqn to Invergordon. Later, in June 1940, the Flying Boat Training Squadron moved away to Stranraer and Calshot became primarily responsible for the repair, maintenance and modification of RAF flying boats, concentrating on the maintenance of Short Sunderlands. The station also continued to provide marine craft maintenance, and to train boat crews.

Calshot sent five seaplane tenders to help in the evacuation at Dunkirk on 31 May 1940 and three of these tenders carried 500 men to safety, with one of them making a successful second voyage. Also in 1940, a small number of ex Norwegian Heinkel He 115 flying boats arrived – later to be used for covert operations, landing and collecting agents from occupied Europe.

The station housed several air-sea rescue (ASR) units from 1942 onwards. These were used in the D-Day landings, providing quick support for downed aircraft.

No. 12 (Flying Boat) Preparation and Modification Unit RAF was established at Calshot 1 September 1945 and disbanded on 25 April 1946, without moving stations.

== 1946 to 1961 ==
Operational squadrons returned to Calshot in March 1946, when No 201 Squadron arrived, to be followed a month later by No 230 Squadron, both equipped with Sunderlands. During the Berlin crisis of 1948, all the Sunderland aircraft from Calshot were called into action and flew over 1,000 sorties to the Berlin lakes from Hamburg carrying food into the city and evacuating sick children. On their return from Berlin, both squadrons were transferred to Pembroke.

After this, although some flying continued, the station was primarily a marine craft station, providing Air Sea Rescue, target-towing and range safety launches, and also included No 238 Maintenance Unit, responsible for the servicing of all RAF marine craft.

A notable event at RAF Calshot was the award of a George Medal to Corporal Peter (Andy) Anderson 3059642. In February 1950, whilst ferrying crew to their Sunderland flying boat as Duty Coxswain, an aircraft he had earlier supplied with technicians, burst into flames. This was due to float flares coming into contact with water, as the plane had partially sunk during a storm. Cpl Anderson transferred his remaining aircraft crews and, on passing a fireboat, ordered the burning plane to be sprayed with foam whilst he rescued the two fitters, who were in the burning water holding onto a propeller blade. With his own seaplane tender now on fire, he dropped them off at the jetty to be treated for their injuries. Cpl Anderson was awarded his George Medal at Buckingham Palace on 14 November 1951 by the Duke of Gloucester, George VI being ill at the time.

Two unfinished Saunders-Roe Princess flying boats, designed to carry 100 passengers and with a range of 5000 miles, were cocooned at RAF Calshot, near the island hangar during the 1950s and 1960s, before being scrapped. The third one was cocooned at Cowes.

On 1 April 1961, the RAF base finally closed, the marine craft work being transferred to RAF Mount Batten in Plymouth Sound.

== Units ==
The following units were here at some point:

- No. 1 Marine Craft Training School
- No. 6 Flying Boat Servicing Unit
- No. 10 Group
- No. 10 Squadron RAAF
- No. 12 (Flying Boat) Aircraft Preparation and Modification Unit
- No. 30 Air/Sea Rescue Marine Craft Unit
- No. 32 Air/Sea Rescue Marine Craft Unit
- No. 33 Air/Sea Rescue Marine Craft Unit
- 74th (Operations) Wing
- No. 84 Maintenance Unit
- No. 101 (Long Range) Air-Sea Rescue Unit
- No. 102 (Long Range) Air-Sea Rescue Unit
- No. 103 (Long-Range) Air-Sea Rescue Unit
- No. 104 (Long-Range) Air-Sea Rescue Unit
- No. 105 (Long-Range) Air-Sea Rescue Unit
- No. 201 Squadron
- No. 210 Training Depot Squadron
- No. 228 Squadron
- No. 230 Squadron
- No. 235 Operational Conversion Unit
- No. 238 Maintenance Unit
- No. 238 Squadron
- No. 240 Squadron
- No. 345 (Flying Boat) Flight
- No. 346 (Flying Boat) Flight
- No. 410 (Seaplane) Flight
- No. 2793 Squadron RAF Regiment
- 'A' Boat Seaplane Training Flight
- 'B' Boat Seaplane Training Flight
- Aerial Navigation School
- Air Pilotage Flight
- Air-Sea Warfare Development Unit
- Floatplane Training Flight
- Flying Boat Training Squadron
- High Speed Flight
- Marine Craft Section (Ferry Pool), Calshot
- Naval Co-operation Flight
- Navigation School
- School of Aerial Navigation
- School of Air Sea Rescue
- School of Naval Co-operation and Aerial Navigation
- Seaplane Training Flight
- Seaplane Training Squadron
- Survival and Rescue Training Unit

== Post-RAF ==
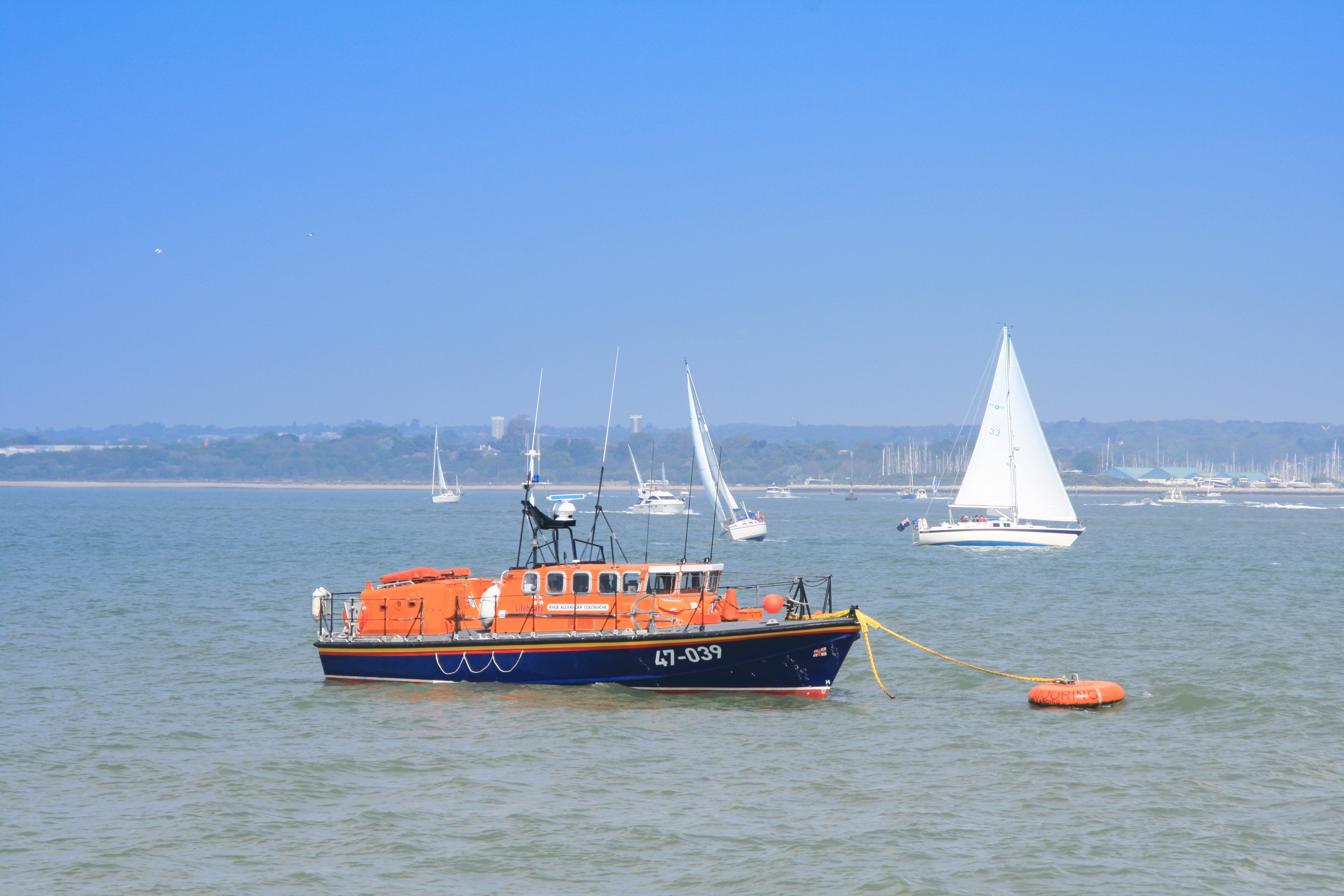
RNLI Tyne class lifeboat at Calshot Spit mooring

In January 1962, evacuees from the island of Tristan da Cunha, which had suffered a volcanic eruption, were relocated in the decommissioned RAF Calshot. They settled into sixty-four vacant houses in the former married quarters, an area renamed 'Tristan Close' in their honour. In December 1962 the majority chose to return to Tristan da Cunha, which was deemed safe; by November 1963, most had departed, though a handful remained in Hampshire, where some descendants live today.

In 1964, Hampshire County Council negotiated a lease with the Crown Estates to use the site as an Activities Centre. The first course – a sailing one for Hampshire children – commenced on 18 May 1964.

On 25 July 1970, the RNLI sent the Keith Nelson type lifeboat ON 1017 Ernest William and Elizabeth Ellen Hyde to Calshot for evaluation, and in 1971 a permanent station was established. As of 2010, an RNLI Tyne-class lifeboat, ON 1157 Alexander Coutanche, was stationed afloat at moorings. In 2012, she was withdrawn from the station and it became an inshore lifeboat station.

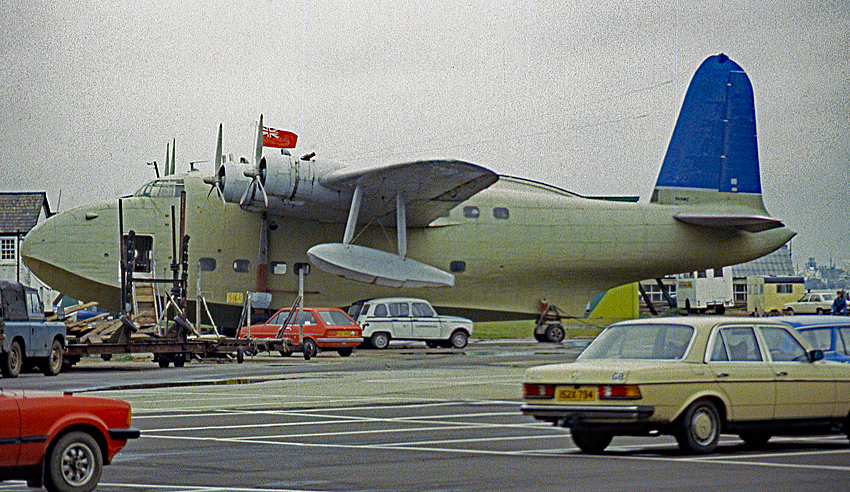
Short Sandringham Southern Cross at Calshot

In 1981, a Short Sandringham flying boat, called the Southern Cross, landed at Calshot after an epic journey across the Atlantic Ocean. This plane is now housed at the Solent Sky aviation museum in Southampton. The last flying Sunderland, Excalibur, came ashore at Calshot in 1984. After an extensive refit, it was flown to Florida in 1994 to join the extensive collection of Kermit Weeks at Fantasy of Flight.

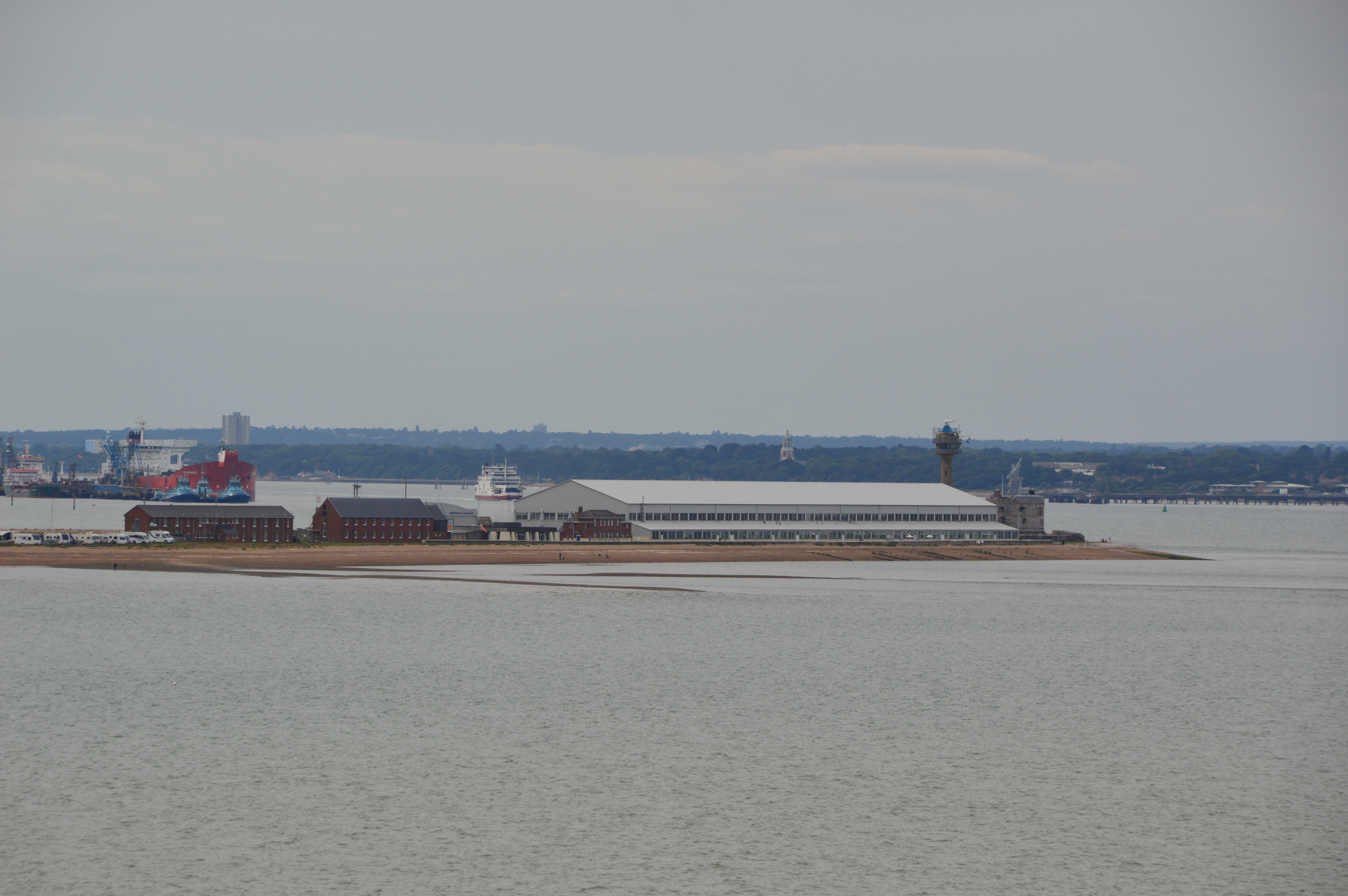
View of buildings from RAF Calshot on Calshot Spit, Hampshire

The site is now used as a base for the RNLI and for HM Coastguard, as well as for the Calshot Activities Centre, which runs courses in a number of water and land-based activities, and uses the original hangars to house indoor climbing walls, artificial ski slopes and a cycle track.

== See also ==
- List of seaplanes and flying boats – United Kingdom
- Seaplane bases in the United Kingdom
