= List of seaplane bases in the United Kingdom =

This article lists both active and historic seaplane bases in the United Kingdom, many of which were either used for, or planned to be used for, the defence of the UK.

A seaplane base may be anything from a stretch of water where seaplanes were based to a full installation, either floating (powered or unpowered) or shore based, where seaplanes were serviced. In the UK these are presumed to be coastal.

== Active seaplane bases ==
- Glasgow Seaplane Terminal, Glasgow
- Oban Bay, Oban
- Loch Lomond
- Tobermory, Isle of Mull
- Enniskillen

== Proposed seaplane base ==
- Royal Albert Docks, London City Airport.

== Former bases ==
- RAF Alness, Alness, Ross and Cromarty
- Bembridge Harbour, Isle of Wight (1915-1919)
- Brough Aerodrome, East Riding of Yorkshire
- RNAS Calshot/RAF Calshot, Hampshire
- RAF Castle Archdale, Lough Erne, Northern Ireland
- RAF Catfirth, Shetland Islands (1917-1919)
- Cromarty, Ross and Cromarty (1913-1915)
- RNAS Donibristle, Dalgety Bay, Fife
- RNAS Dundee (HMS Condor II), Dundee, Angus
- RNAS Felixstowe, Suffolk
- RAF Greenock, Greenock, Inverclyde
- RNAS Hickling Broad, Norfolk
- RNAS Hornsea Mere, East Yorkshire
- RAF Houton, Orkney
- RNAS Kingsnorth, Kent
- RNAS Lawrenny Ferry, Pembrokeshire
- RNAS Lee-on-Solent (HMS Daedalus), Hampshire
- RAF Mount Batten, Plymouth, Devon (was RNAS Cattewater)
- Newhaven Seaplane Base, Tide Mills, east of Newhaven Harbour, Sussex
- RAF Pembroke Dock, Pembrokeshire
- RNAS Portland (HMS Osprey), Portland, Dorset
- RNAS South Denes, Great Yarmouth, Norfolk
- Sullom Voe, Shetland
- RNAS Tresco, Isles of Scilly
- Westgate-on-Sea, Kent
- RAF Woodhaven, Woodhaven, Fife

== See also ==
- List of air stations of the Royal Navy
- RAF Coastal Command
- Royal Air Force
- Royal Flying Corps
- Royal Naval Air Service
- Seaplane tender
