= RAF Catfirth =

Disused RAF base in Shetland, Scotland

RAF Catfirth
- Freester, Mainland, Shetland in Scotland

Site information
- Type: Flying Boat base
- Owner: Air Ministry
- Operator: Royal Naval Air Service; Royal Air Force
- Controlled by: No. 28 Group RAF

Location
- Shown within the Shetland Islands RAF Catfirth (the United Kingdom)
- Coordinates: 60°15′57″N 001°11′27″W

Site history
- Built: 1917
- In use: 1917-1919

RAF Catfirth was a First World War seaplane base located on the island of Mainland in the Shetland Islands, Scotland. The base was under the control of the Royal Naval Air Service (RNAS), and later Royal Air Force (RAF)

== History ==
RAF Catfirth was built by the Air Construction Service and the work was started in November 1917 for the RNAS, and was transferred to the RAF when it was formed on 1 April 1918. The purpose of the base was to house and maintain Felixstowe F.3 flying boats, which patrolled seas round Shetland, looking for German submarines. Though intended to house and maintain 25 flying boats, this was never required as the base was only operational from June 1918 until just after the Armistice on 11 November of that year. RAF Catfirth was closed on 15 April 1919 and the site was returned to open land, though much of the base can still be seen to this day, 100 years later.

RAF Catfirth was also the site of the first ever flight to Shetland. The aeroplane was a Felixstowe Porte Baby, number 9807, and the pilot was Lieutenant Arnold B. Massey AFC. The flight started from RAF Killingholme in Lincolnshire, called at Dundee and RAF Houton on Orkney before completing the 700 mile flight around 8 June 1918. The aeroplane was wrecked in a severe storm a week after arriving, while secured on the concrete apron at the base.

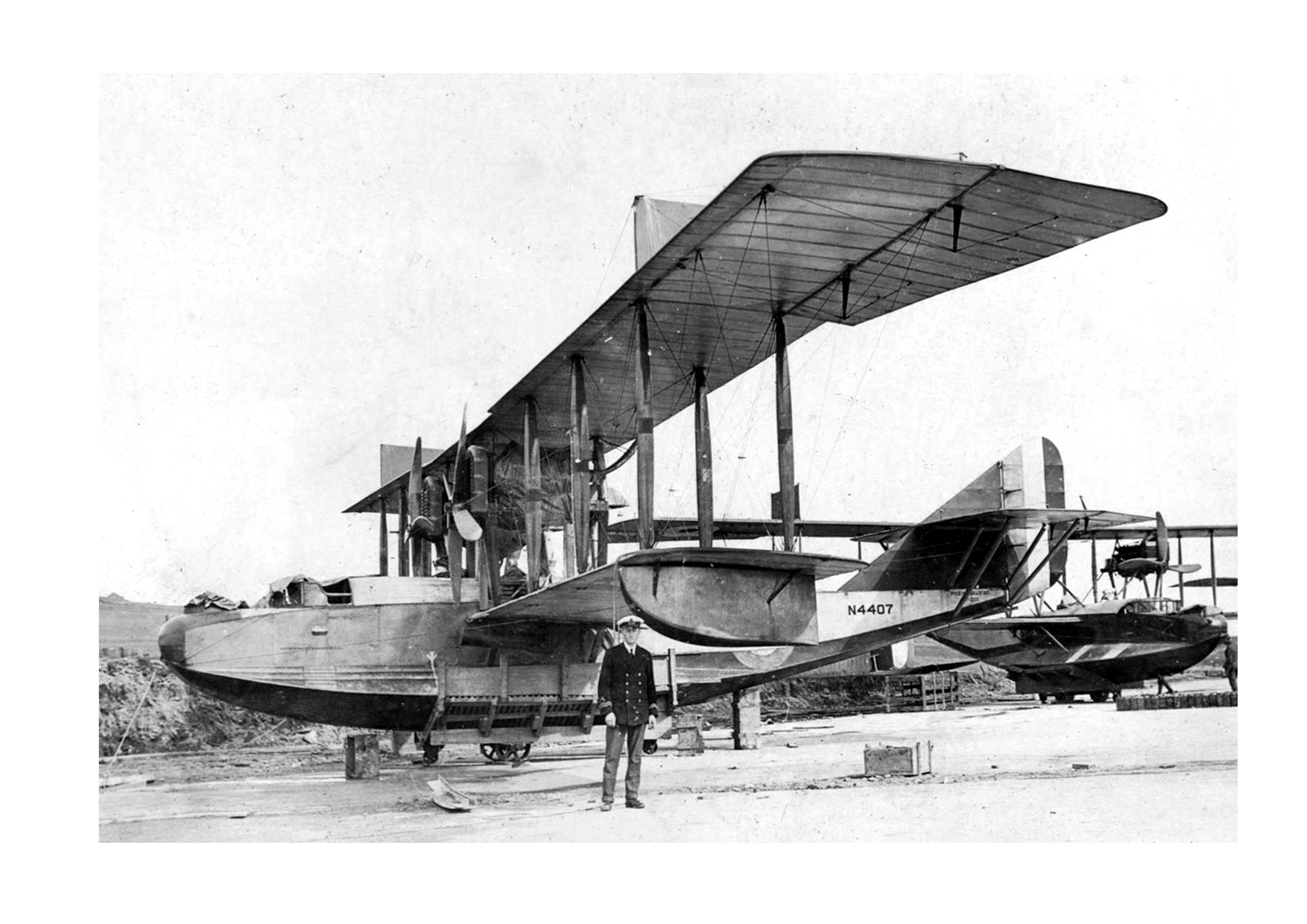
Felixstowe F.3 N4407, which operated from RAF Catfirth.

- 300 (Flying Boat) Flight RAF was formed at Catfirth on 18 June 1918 operating the Felixstowe F.3 flying boat, it was disbanded around March 1919.

It was intended that 301 to 305 Flights would also be formed at Catfirth with the Felixstowe F.3 but the plan was abandoned in September 1918.

== See also ==
- List of seaplane bases in the United Kingdom
