= RNAS Calshot =

Former Royal Naval Air Station in Hampshire, England

- Located near Calshot in Hampshire

Site information
- Type: Seaplane and Flying boat station Naval Air Station
- Controlled by: British Army (1913–14); Royal Navy (1914–18)

Location
- Coordinates: 50.8194°N 1.3083°W

Site history
- Built: 1913
- In use: March 1913 – April 1918
- Battles/wars: First World War

RNAS Calshot was a First World War Royal Navy air station for seaplanes and flying boats, mainly operating as an experimental and training station, but also providing anti-submarine and convoy protection patrols.

It was located at the end of Calshot Spit in Southampton Water, at grid reference SU487024, with the landing area sheltered by the mainland, to the west, north and east, and the Isle of Wight a few miles away to the south on the other side of the Solent.

== History ==
=== Royal Flying Corps ===
The station was originally established on 29 March 1913 by the Royal Flying Corps (RFC), as Calshot Naval Air Station, for the purpose of testing seaplanes for the RFC Naval wing. The first aircraft to arrive was a Sopwith Bat Boat, and one of the first buildings constructed – the Sopwith Hangar – is still in use today.

=== Royal Naval Air Service ===
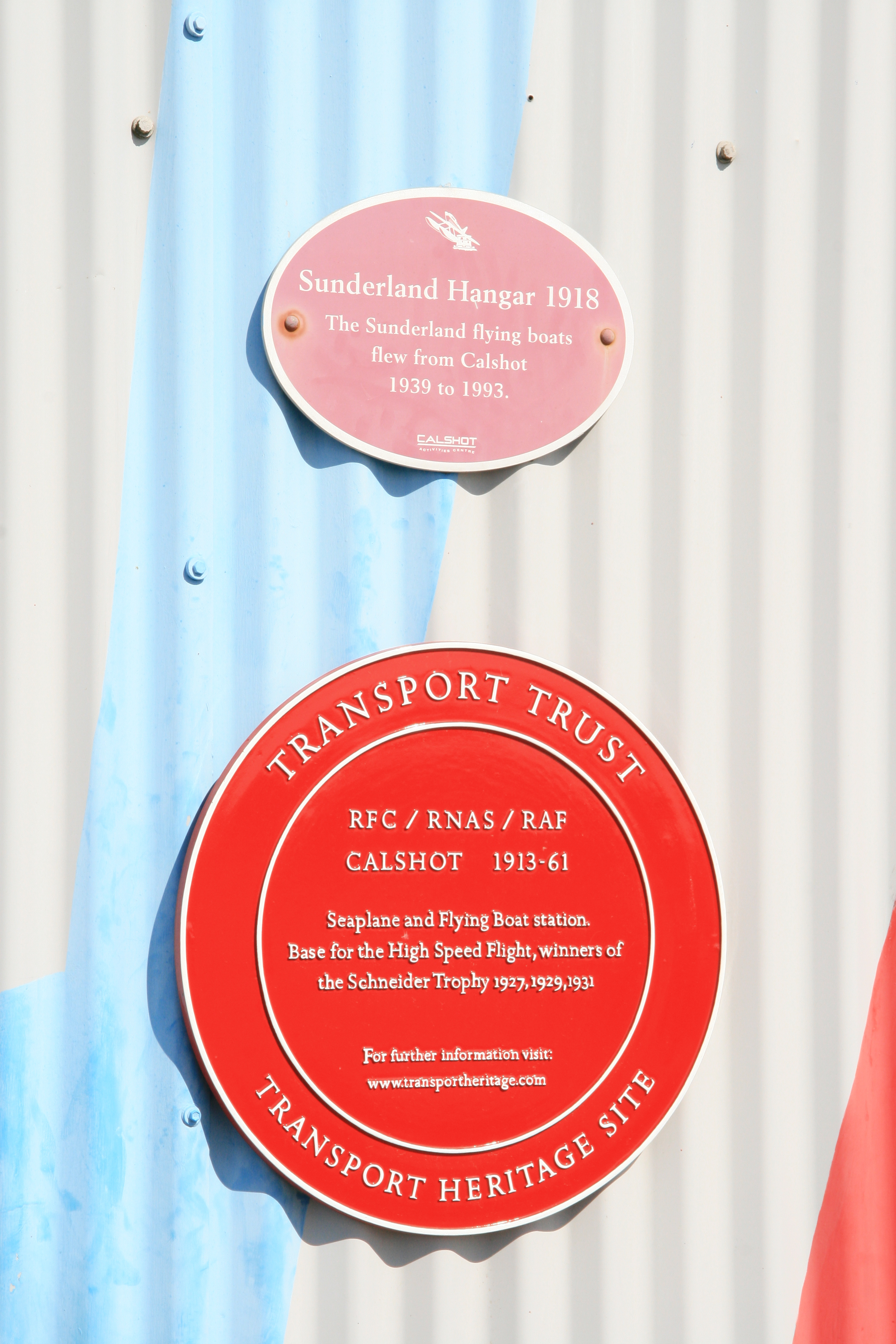
Transport Heritage Site plaque on the former Sunderland flying boat hangar, now used to house climbing walls and a velodrome.

In July 1914 the Royal Navy re-formed its air branch, naming it the Royal Naval Air Service (RNAS), and took over the Calshot base and its development and training functions. After the start of World War I, the station's role expanded to take on the protection of shipping in the English Channel, and a variety of flying-boats and seaplanes were introduced, including the Wight Seaplane and the Short 184. Calshot was also used for training on observer kite balloons and airships.

In 1917, seaplane training was extended to the new Naval Seaplane Training School at nearby Lee-on-the-Solent (but over 30 miles away by the shortest land route). A major rebuild at Calshot then took place when new buildings, offices and workshops were constructed by the Henry Boot Limited. The largest hangar – Sunderland Hangar – is now home to the Calshot Activities Centre.

By 1918 there were two flights of Felixstowe flying boats and a flight of seaplanes, and together they managed to exceed 9,000 hours of patrol flights in a three-month period. Out of 42 U-boats reported, 3 were sunk.

=== Royal Air Force ===
On 1 April 1918 the RFC and the RNAS combined to form the Royal Air Force (RAF) and the station became home to the headquarters of No. 10 Group RAF. The three flights that were based at Calshot became No. 240 Squadron RAF.

After the war, the station became home to the RAF School of Naval Co-operation and Aerial Navigation, and on 5 February 1922 was renamed RAF Calshot.

== See also ==
- RNAS Lee-on-Solent (HMS Daedalus)
- List of seaplanes and flying boats – United Kingdom
- Seaplane bases in the United Kingdom
- List of air stations of the Royal Navy
- List of former Royal Air Force stations
