= Calshot Activities Centre =

Sports centre in Hampshire, England

Coordinates: 50.818761°N 1.308103°W

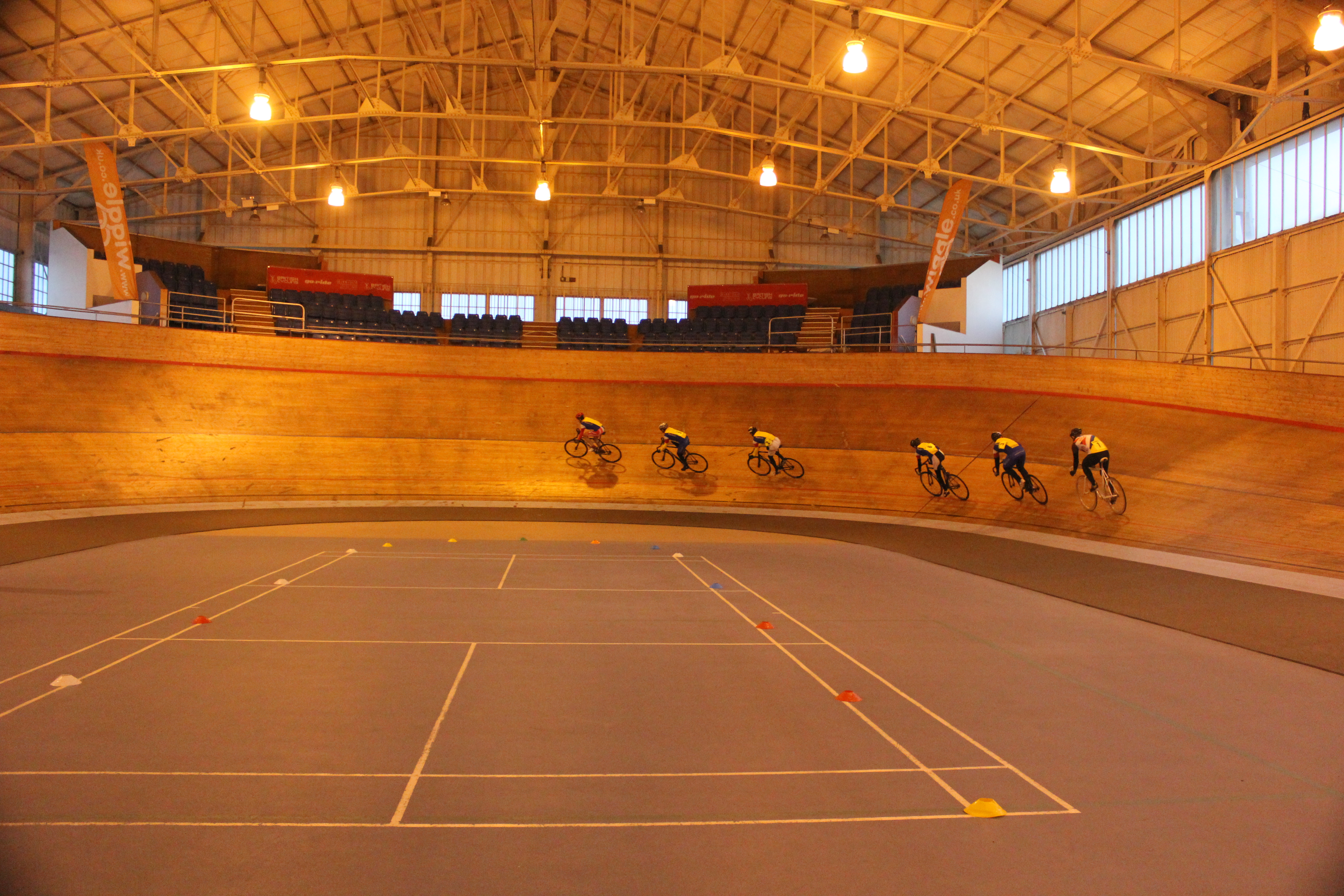
Calshot velodrome with Woolwich CC cyclists riding round banking (March 2013)

Calshot Activities Centre is located on Calshot Spit near Southampton. Indoor facilities include the oldest indoor velodrome in Britain, a dry ski slope and a climbing wall.

== Velodrome ==
Calshot Velodrome is the oldest indoor cycling venue in the UK. It is located inside an old aircraft hangar, is unheated and has a reputation for being rather cold. The current wooden velodrome was built in 1996 to replace an older slightly smaller wooden track.

The former wooden track was a shortened version of the London six-day racing track used at Earls Court in 1967 (not to be confused with a similar track used at Wembley from 1968 to 1980).

The current track is 142.85 metres long with bankings of 45° and straights at approximately 20°.

Calshot Winter Track League, run under British Cycling rules, is held weekly from October to February.

== See also ==
- List of cycling tracks and velodromes
