= Boston Whaler-class lifeboat =

Inshore lifeboat class of the RNLI

Class overview
- Name: Boston Whaler class
- Builders: Boston Whaler
- Operators: Royal National Lifeboat Institution
- Preceded by: McLachlan
- Succeeded by: Atlantic 21
- Built: 1985
- In service: 1985–1994
- Completed: 1
- Retired: 1

General characteristics
- Length: 20 ft 6 in (6.25 m)
- Beam: 7 ft 2 in (2.18 m)
- Draught: 2 ft 0 in (0.61 m)
- Propulsion: 2 x 60 hp Evinrude diesels
- Speed: 30 knots (35 mph; 56 km/h)
- Endurance: 6 hours
- Complement: 3

The Boston Whaler-class lifeboat was one of a group of rigid-hull Inshore lifeboats, developed after the success of the smaller D-class Inshore lifeboats, operated by the Royal National Lifeboat Institution (RNLI) of the United Kingdom and Ireland. Just one lifeboat was placed in service, operating from 1985 to 1994. It was replaced by the Atlantic 21.

== History ==
Following the success of the introduction of small fast D-class (RFD PB16) Inshore lifeboats in 1963, it was quickly seen that a larger class of Inshore boat would bridge the gap between the smaller D-class, and the standard All-weather lifeboats. These boats would have a rigid hull, capable of being moored afloat, and offering the option of being a boarding boat, but still be fast, and easy to launch. The third of these was the Dory-class lifeboat produced in 1968 and 1969.

The 'Dell Quay Dory' saw service at Eastney, Ramsgate, Lyme Regis, but particularly found favour at Poole, where it was ideally suited to the conditions around Poole Harbour. When A-502 was coming to the end of her operational life in the mid 1980s, the station was offered a B-class (Atlantic 21) RIB, but a Dory was still their preferred option. As the RNLI finally decided to agree to the request, Dell Quay Productions Ltd ceased trading.

Other options were then considered, and following a demonstration and test of a new boat from a local business, who had recently become an agent, an order was placed for an American-built 20 ft 6 in (6.25 m) Boston Whaler Outrage. The boat was fitted out to RNLI specification at the Inshore Lifeboat Centre in Cowes.

On 21 January 1985, the RNLI placed the 20-foot 6in Rigid fibreglass Boston Whaler Outrage lifeboat on service at Poole Lifeboat Station in Dorset.

The boat had primarily been funded in Poole, from the 1981 Poole mayor's appeal, the Round Table and 'Beating the Bounds' collections. At a naming ceremony held at Poole Yacht Club on Wed 8 May 1985, Councillor P. J. Coles (former mayor) named the lifeboat Sam and Iris Coles (A-513) in memory of his parents.

Only one lifeboat of this rigid fibreglass type was employed by the RNLI, and was the last surviving rigid-hull Inshore Lifeboat in service, following the withdrawal of the McLachlan-class lifeboats in 1988. The lifeboat had been specifically placed at Poole due to the shallow conditions in Poole Harbour, but whilst away for maintenance, it was finally realised that a B-class lifeboat was equally effective. Sam and Iris Coles was withdrawn for use as a work boat at the Inshore Lifeboat Centre on 28 November 1994, and replaced with a B-class (Atlantic 21).

In a nine-year period on station at Poole, the boat was launched 593 times, and saved 106 lives.

== Fleet ==
Op. No. (Note: Op. No. is the RNLI's Operational Number of the boat carried on the hull.)	Name	Built	In service	Station	Comments
A-513	Sam and Iris Coles	1985	1985–1994	Poole	

== See also ==
- List of RNLI stations
- List of former RNLI stations
- Royal National Lifeboat Institution lifeboats
