= Poole Lifeboat Station =

RNLI lifeboat station in Dorset, England

- Flag of the RNLI

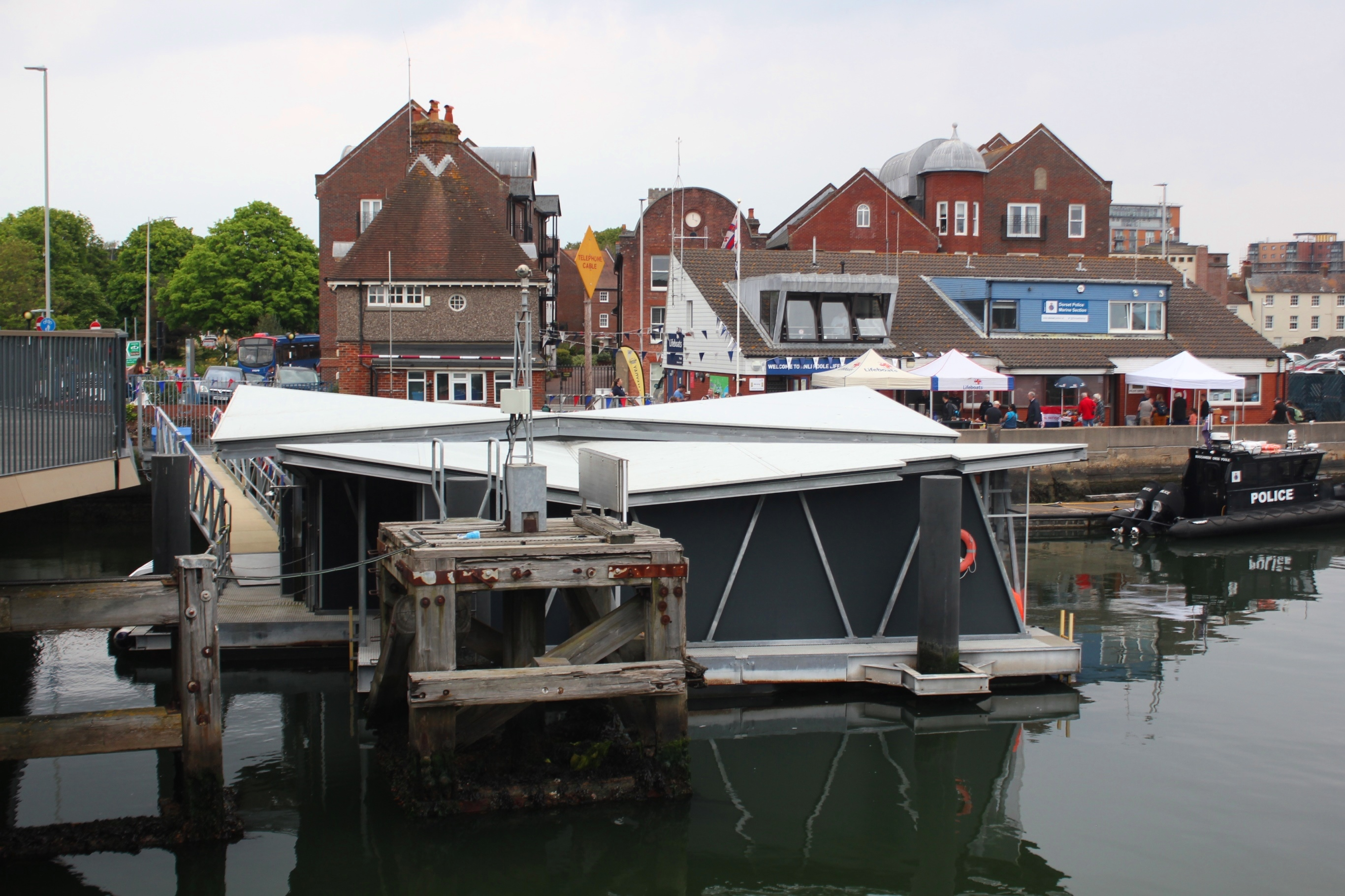
- The boathouse and crew building in 2024

- Location within Dorset

General information
- Type: Lifeboat station
- Location: The Bridge House, The Quay, Poole, Dorset, BH15 1HZ, England
- Coordinates: 50.7127°N 1.9921°W
- Opened: 1865 at Sandbanks; 1882 at Fisherman's Dock; 1974 at Lilliput Marina; 1989 at Poole Bridge
- Owner: Royal National Lifeboat Institution

Website
- Poole RNLI Lifeboat Station

Poole Lifeboat Station can be found next to the lifting bridge on The Quay at Poole, a harbour town overlooking Brownsea Island and Poole Harbour, in the county of Dorset, on the south coast of England.

A lifeboat was first stationed at Sandbanks in 1865 by the Royal National Lifeboat Institution (RNLI). The present station in Poole was opened in 1988.

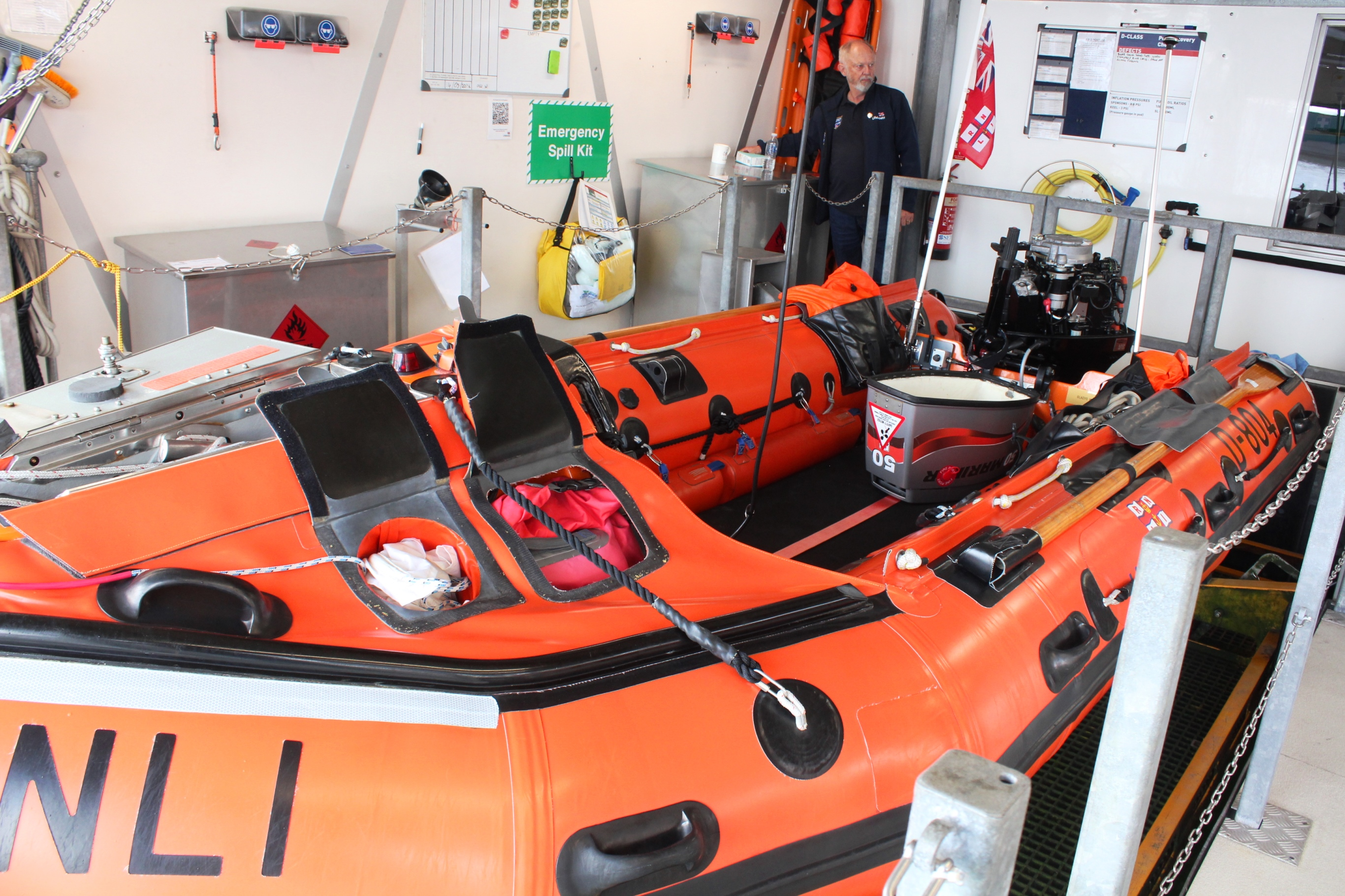
D-class (IB1) Gladys Maud Burton (D-804)

The station currently operates two inshore lifeboats, a B-class (Atlantic 85), Jean-Ray (B-961), on station since 2026, and the smaller D-class (IB1), Gladys Maud Burton, (D-804), on station since 2017.

== History ==
As there was no life-boat establishment between Lyme Regis on that coast and the Isle of Wight, and as wrecks attended with danger to the crews must be liable to occur to vessels in making for Poole Harbour, or from their parting their cables if anchored in the Bay, it was considered that a life-boat might advantageously be placed at Poole, especially as the pilots and fishermen had represented that they had frequently undergone great risk in rescuing the crews of stranded vessels.

— The Life-boat, vol. V, issue 58, 2 October 1865

The first boathouse was built in 1865 on a site granted by Sir Ivor Guest, Bt, at Sandbanks, by the narrow entrance to Poole Harbour. Each time the lifeboat was required, the crew had to be collected by horse-drawn coach from the Antelope Hotel in the High Street and taken to Sandbanks.

A 32-foot-long (9.8 m) self-righting 'Pulling and Sailing' (P&S) lifeboat was constructed by Forrestt of Limehouse, London, at a cost of £210, and transported to Poole free of charge by the London and South Western Railway. The station and lifeboat was funded by the donation of £500 from an anonymous lady, and at a grand ceremony in Poole on 19 January 1865, the lifeboat was named Manley Wood, before being launched on demonstration.

In 1882 a new boathouse was built on land leased from Poole Corporation on the Fisherman's Dock at the east end of Poole Quay. A dedicated slipway was built in front of the boathouse in 1897 as the public slipway was often blocked by other boats. In 1887 a flagstaff had been erected so that messages could be exchanged with Sandbanks. At this time the crew was summoned to launches by a signal rocket. In 1892 this was changed to a signal mortar but this reverted to rockets in 1914 as the mortar being discharged could be mistaken for an explosion at the nearby gas works.

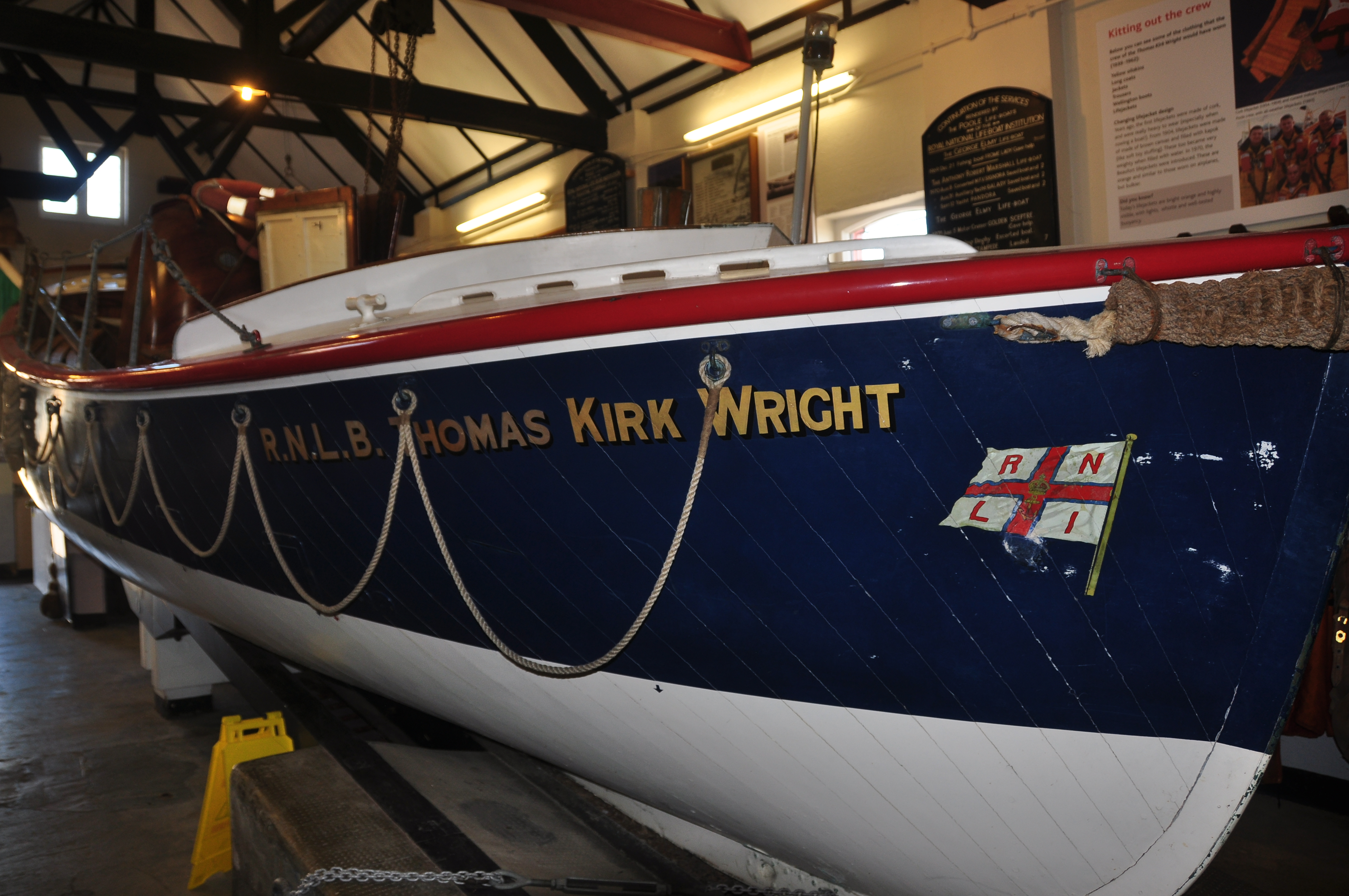
Thomas Kirk Wright (ON 811)

The last 'pulling and sailing' lifeboat at Poole, Harmar (ON 608), was withdrawn in 1939. It was replaced by a Surf-class motor lifeboat, Thomas Kirk Wright (ON 811), built by Groves and Guttridge of Cowes, at a cost of £3,337, and funded from the legacy of Mr T. K. Wright.

On 30 May 1940, Thomas Kirk Wright sailed to Dunkirk as one of boats summoned for Operation Dynamo, and was the first of 19 lifeboats to arrive there. It was crewed by the Royal Navy but was damaged by enemy fire. After repairs, a second trip across the channel was made on 2 June 1940, before eventually returning to normal duties at Poole.

An inflatable Inshore Rescue Boat was placed on station in 1964 but withdrawn in 1970, although by this time a 'Dell Quay Dory' was also in use. After a succession of 'rigid-hull' Inshore lifeboats, the last one, a Boston Whaler Outrage, Sam and Iris Coles (A-513), was withdrawn from service in 1994, replaced initially by a B-class (Atlantic 21) Rigid inflatable boat, and a new B-class (Atlantic 75) Inshore lifeboat in 1995.

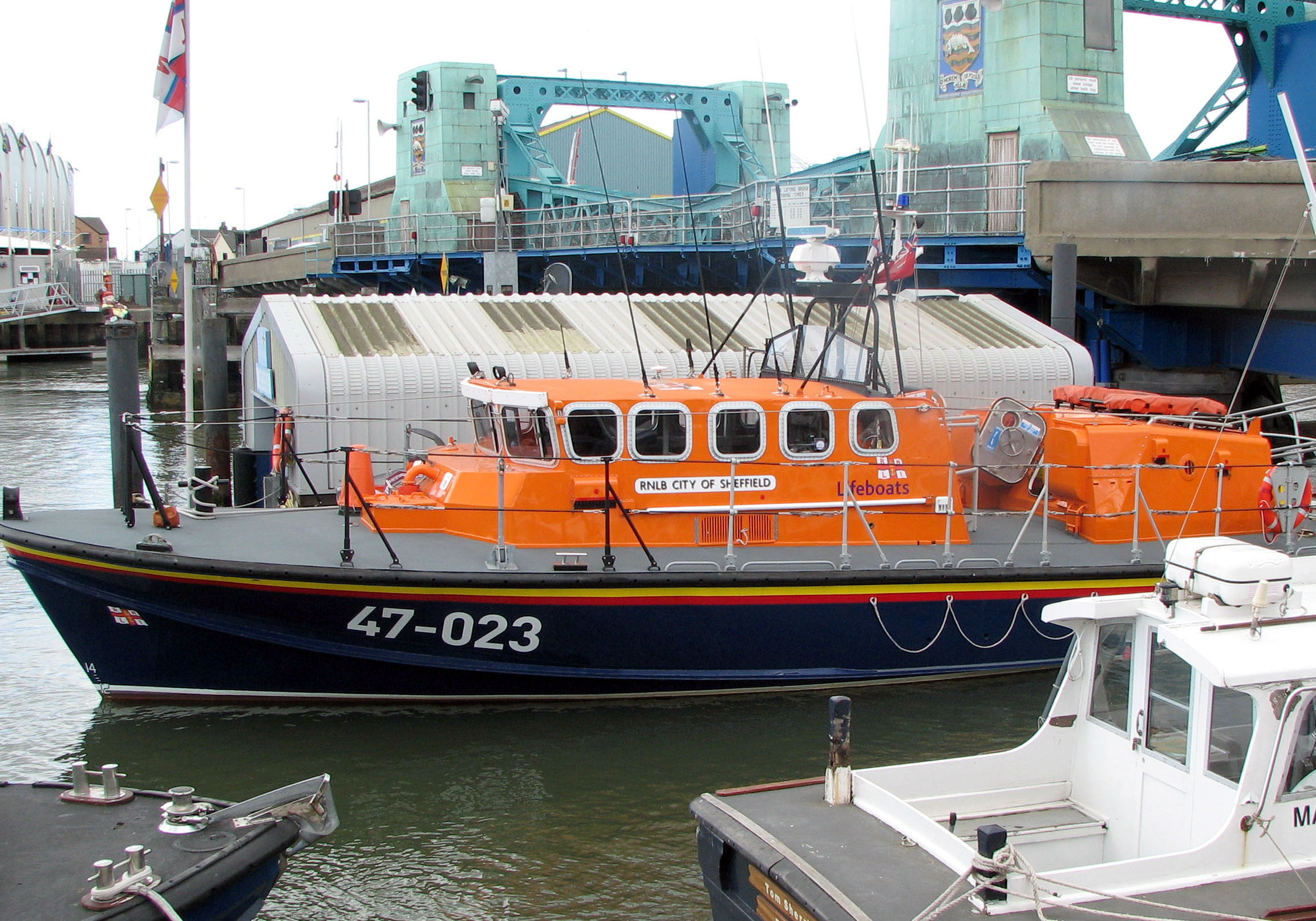
Tyne-class lifeboat 47-023 City of Sheffield (ON 1131)

The boathouse at Fisherman's Dock was closed in 1974 and a new station opened with the Poole Harbour Yacht Club at Lilliput Marina. The lifeboat was moved back to Poole Quay in 1989, but this time at the west end, beneath Poole Bridge. The following year, new crew facilities and storerooms were constructed by adding a two-storey extension to the old police office on Poole Quay.

In 1994 a floating boathouse was placed next to the lifeboat mooring for the new ILB Friendly Forrester II (B-710), that took up service at Poole the following year.

In November 2016, with lifeboats at flanking stations capable of 25 knots (46 km/h; 29 mph), the RNLI decided to withdraw the All-weather lifeboat 47-023 City of Sheffield (ON 1131), and placed an additional D-class (IB1) Inshore lifeboat John Wickens (D-798) on station, to work alongside the existing Atlantic 85. John Wickens (D-798) was soon replaced with the permanent D-class (IB1) Inshore lifeboat Gladys Maud Burton (D-804) in 2017.

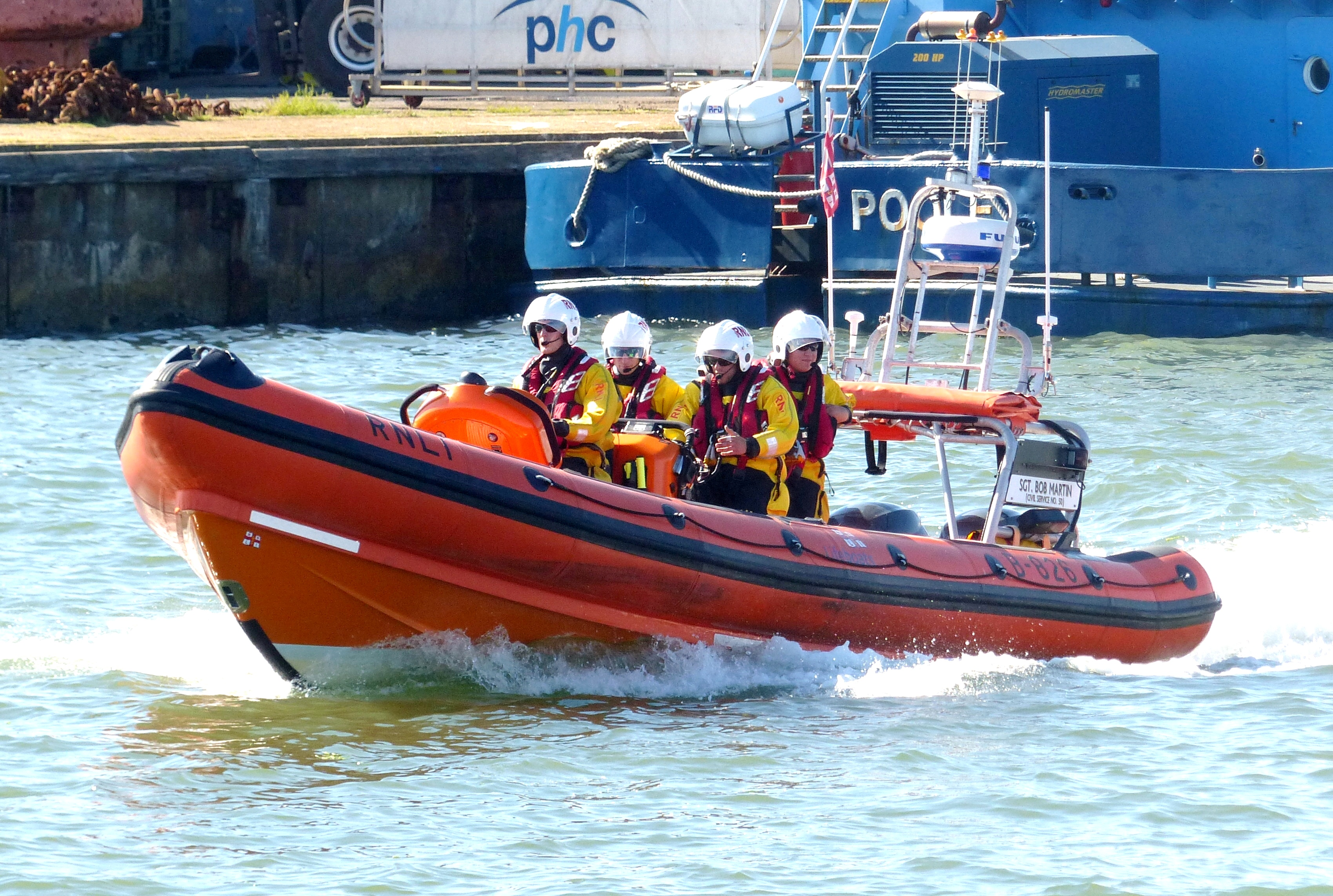
Atlantic 85 Sgt Bob Martin (Civil Service No.50) (B-826)

On 10 October 2026, Poole's long serving B-class (Atlantic 85) Sgt Bob Martin (Civil Service No.50) (B-826), on station since 2008, was withdrawn from service.

Serving at Poole for 18 years, the lifeboat has been launched 1,514 times, assisted 1,545 people, and helped save 42 lives.

The lifeboat is being replaced with the B-class (Atlantic 85) Jean-Ray (B-961). The new lifeboat is still a Mk.3 version, but designed to be easily upgraded to incorporate the forthcoming Mk.4 modifications.

== Description ==
The crew facilities and storeroom occupies one part of a larger brick-built building facing the water on Poole Quay. The upper floor is set into the roof with a large window overlooking the lifeboat's pontoon. The floating boathouse for the ILBs is moored alongside this pontoon adjacent to the Lifting Bridge.

== Poole Old Lifeboat Museum ==
Former Lifeboat House, now Lifeboat Museum

A year after the boathouse at Fisherman's Dock was closed in 1974, it became an RNLI museum. It was handed to the council in 1991.

The centrepiece of the museum is a Surf-class lifeboat, on loan from the National Maritime Museum. Thomas Kirk Wright (ON 811) was the station's first motor-powered lifeboat, built in 1939, and fitted with a radical water-jet propulsion system.

The lifeboat operated out of Poole lifeboat station until it was withdrawn in 1962. In 1940, it had been one of the lifeboats involved in the Dunkirk evacuation. During her time on station, the lifeboat was launched 64 times, saving 15 lives.

== Station honours ==
The following are awards made at Poole:

- RNIPLS Gold Medal
  Capt. Charles Howe Fremantle, RN, Commander of H.M. Coastguard, Lymington – 1824
- RNIPLS Silver Medal
  George Barnes – 1824
  Stephen Curtis – 1824
  Lt. Joseph Elwin, RN – 1825
  Lt. Thomas Parsons, RN – 1853
- RNLI Silver Medal
  The Right Hon. The Viscount Bury, MP – 1868
  Charles Pride – 1868
  Richard Stokes, Coxswain – 1882
- 'The Thanks of the Institution inscribed on Vellum'
  Richard Wills, Coxswain – 1906
  Thomas Wills – 1906
  John Wills – 1906
  Richard Cartridge – 1906
  Henry Russell – 1906
  David Coles, crew member – 1986
  Steven Vince, crew member – 1986
  Raymond Collin, crew member – 1986
- 'A Framed Letter of Thanks signed by the Chairman of the Institution'
  Steve Vince, Coxswain – 1995
  Robert Doak, crew member – 1995
  Geoffrey Langley, crew member – 1995
  Gavin McGuiness, Helm – 2001
  Anne Millman, crew member – 2001
  Paul Savage, crew member – 2001

== Roll of honour ==
In memory of those lost whilst serving at Poole:

- Run over by the lifeboat carriage, whilst getting out after an exercise on 9 October 1884
  James Hughes, crew member (30)

== Poole lifeboats ==
=== Pulling and sailing lifeboats ===
| On station | ON (Note: ON is the RNLI's Official Number of the boat.) | Name | Built | Class | Comments |
|---|---|---|---|---|---|
| 1865–1879 | Pre-425 | Manley Wood | 1864 | 32-foot Prowse self-righting (P&S) | (Note: 32 ft 0 in (9.75 m) x 7 ft 4 in (2.24 m) (10-oared) Prowse-class self-righting (P&S) lifeboat, gift of an anonymous lady, built by Forrestt of Limehouse, London, costing £210.); Renamed Joseph and Mary in 1879. |
| 1879–1880 | Pre-425 | Joseph and Mary | 1864 | 32-foot Prowse self-righting (P&S) | (Note: Legacy of Mrs Boetefeur of London.); Sold in 1880 and broken up. |
| 1880–1882 | 188 | Joseph and Mary | 1880 | 34-foot self-righting (P&S) | (Note: 34 ft 0 in (10.36 m) x 8 ft 3 in (2.51 m) (10-oared) self-righting (P&S) lifeboat, legacy of Mrs Boetefeur of London, built by Woolfe of Shadwell, London, costing £363.); Renamed Boy's Own No. 2 in 1882. |
| 1882–1896 | 188 | Boy's Own No. 2 | 1880 | 34-foot self-righting (P&S) | (Note: Gift of the Boys Own LB fund.); Sold in 1896. |
| 1897–1910 | 316 | City Masonic Club | 1892 | 38-foot Watson (P&S) | (Note: 38 ft 0 in (11.58 m) x 9 ft 4 in (2.84 m) (12-oared) Watson-class non-self-righting (P&S) lifeboat, gift of the Freemasons of the City of London, built by D. and W. Henderson and Company of Partick, costing £924.); Transferred to the Relief fleet. Sold in 1918. |
| 1910–1939 | 608 | Harmar | 1910 | 37-foot 6in self-righting (P&S) | (Note: 37 ft 6 in (11.43 m) x 9 ft 3 in (2.82 m) (12-oared) self-righting (P&S) lifeboat, legacy of Mr G. J. Harmar of London, built by Thames Ironworks of Blackwall, London, costing £1,086.); Sold in 1939. |

=== Motor lifeboats ===
| On station | ON | Op.No. (Note: Op.No. is the RNLI's Operational Number of the boat carried on the hull.) | Name | Built | Class | Comments |
|---|---|---|---|---|---|---|
| 1939–1962 | 811 | — | Thomas Kirk Wright | 1939 | Surf | Sold in 1964. Now on display in the Old Lifeboat House at Poole. |
| 1962–1969 | 891 | — | Bassett-Green | 1951 | Liverpool | Previously at Padstow. Sold in 1969. In private ownership as Bassett-Green at Campbeltown, June 2024 |
| 1969–1971 | 873 | — | George Elmy | 1950 | Liverpool | Capsized on service at Seaham on 17 November 1962 with nine lives lost. Sold in September 1972. Restored to original condition and on display at Seaham Harbour from July 2013. |
| 1971–1974 | 872 | — | J. B. Couper of Glasgow | 1949 | Liverpool | Previously at St Abbs, Kirkcudbright and Youghal. Sold February 1976. Renamed Etoile Du Nord (GU 5045). On display outside the Peninsular Hotel, Vale, Guernsey, December 2025. |
| 1974–1983 | 1029 | 44-011 | Augustine Courtauld | 1974 | Waveney | Transferred to the Relief fleet, later at Troon |
| 1983–2001 | 1089 | 33-07 | Inner Wheel | 1983 | Brede | Transferred to Calshot. |
| 2001–2016 | 1131 | 47-023 | City of Sheffield | 1988 | Tyne | Sold in 2017. Now preserved at the National Emergency Services Museum, Sheffield. |

More post-service details can be found on the respective lifeboat class pages.

=== Inshore lifeboats ===
==== A class ====
| On station | Op.No. | Name | Class | Comments |
|---|---|---|---|---|
| 1967–1969 | 18-03 | Unnamed | A-class (Hatch) | Renumbered A-2 in 1972 |
| 1969–1972 | 17-003 | Unnamed | A-class (Dory) | Renumbered A-502 in 1972. |
| 1971 | 18-02 | Unnamed | A-class (McLachlan) | Renumbered A-503 in 1972 |
| 1972–1973 | A-500 | Unnamed | A-class (Dory) | Previously Op.No. 17-001 |
| 1974–1975 | A-501 | Bob Abbott | A-class (Dory) | Previously Op.No. 17-002 |
| 1975–1985 | A-502 | Unnamed | A-class (Dory) | Previously Op.No. 17-003. |
| 1985–1994 | A-513 | Sam and Iris Coles | A-class (Boston Whaler) | |

==== D class ====
| On station | Op.No. | Name | Class | Comments |
|---|---|---|---|---|
| 1965–1967 | D-69 | Unnamed | D-class (RFD PB16) | |
| 1967–1970 | D-46 | Unnamed | D-class (RFD PB16) | |
D-class withdrawn 1970–2016
| 2016–2017 | D-798 | John Wickens | D-class (IB1) | |
| 2017– | D-804 | Gladys Maud Burton | D-class (IB1) | |

==== B class ====
| On station | Op. No. | Name | Class | Comments |
|---|---|---|---|---|
| 1975 | B-8 | Unnamed | B-class | Trial boat |
| 1977 | B-8 | Unnamed | B-class | Trial boat |
| 1994–1995 | B-548 | Aldershot | B-class (Atlantic 21) | |
| 1995–2008 | B-710 | Friendly Forrester II | B-class (Atlantic 75) | |
| 2008 | B-736 | Toshiba Wave Warrior | B-class (Atlantic 75) | |
| 2008–2026 | B-826 | Sgt Bob Martin (Civil Service No.50) | B-class (Atlantic 85) | |
| 2026– | B-961 | Jean-Ray | B-class (Atlantic 85) | |

== See also ==
- List of RNLI stations
- List of former RNLI stations
- Royal National Lifeboat Institution lifeboats
- RNLI College training facility in Poole
