= Ramsgate Lifeboat Station =

RNLI lifeboat Station located in the Port of Ramsgate in Kent

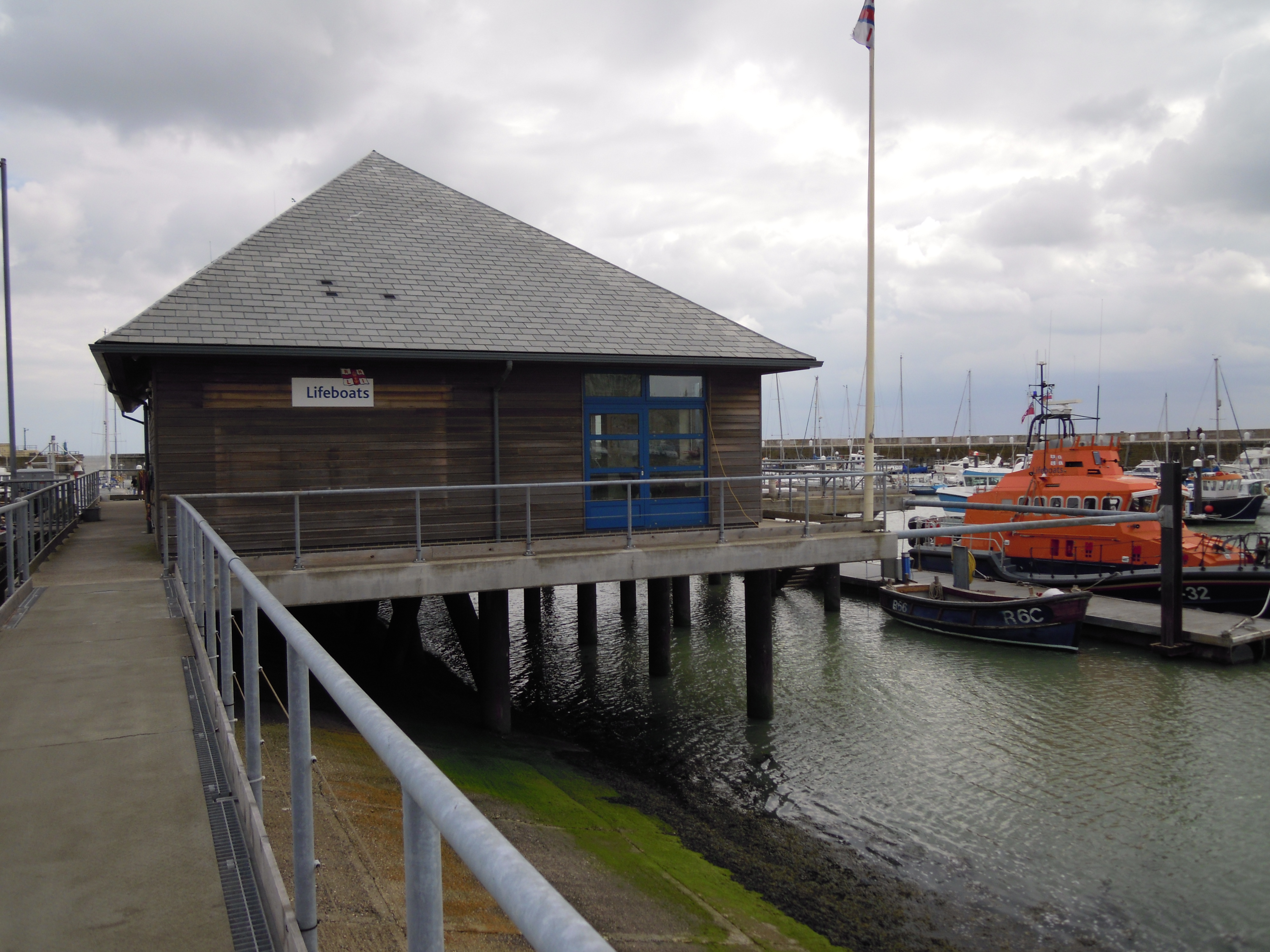
- Ramsgate Lifeboat Station.

- Location within Kent

General information
- Type: RNLI Lifeboat Station
- Location: Ramsgate Lifeboat Station, Western Crosswall, Ramsgate Royal Harbour, Ramsgate, Kent, CT11 9RN, England
- Coordinates: 51°19′44.4″N 1°25′11.2″E
- Opened: 1802–1824; 1851–present
- Owner: Royal National Lifeboat Institution

Technical details
- Material: Fabricated steelwork clad with timber, and concrete

Website
- Ramsgate RNLI Lifeboat Station

Ramsgate Lifeboat Station is located on Western Crosswall in the Ramsgate Royal Harbour. Ramsgate is a town on the south-east corner of the Isle of Thanet peninsula, in north-east Kent.

A lifeboat was first placed at Ramsgate in 1802 by the Harbour Trustees, operating until 1824. It was re-established by the trustees in 1851. From 1865, the station was jointly managed by the Royal National Lifeboat Institution (RNLI) and the Board of Trade, passing solely to the RNLI in 1922.

Tamar-class lifeboat 16-23 Diamond Jubilee (ON 1303)

The current lifeboat station, on the harbour wall between the inner and outer pools of the main harbour, opened in 1998, and currently operates an All-weather Tamar-class lifeboat, 16-23 Diamond Jubilee (ON 1303), on station since 2023, and a B-class (Atlantic 85) Inshore lifeboat, Claire & David Delves (B-878), on station since 2014.

== History ==
A lifeboat station was first established at Ramsgate Harbour in 1802 by the Ramsgate Harbour Trustees, pre-dating the formation of any national lifeboat organisation by more than 20 years, and is one of the oldest to operate in the British Isles. A lifeboat was purchased from Henry Greathead, and operated at Ramsgate until 1824.

In 1851, Algernon Percy, 4th Duke of Northumberland, of Alnwick Castle, had been appointed president of the Royal National Institution for the Preservation of Life from Shipwreck (RNIPLS), the Institution becoming the RNLI in 1854. He set a competition for the design of a Self-righting lifeboat, with the reward of £100, which was won by James Beeching of Great Yarmouth. The prize-winning lifeboat was purchased for £250 by the Ramsgate harbour trustees, and placed on service at Ramsgate in late 1851. Whilst no formal naming records have been found, the boat was subsequently referred to as Northumberland.

In 1863, management of Ramsgate harbour was transferred to the Board of Trade. With the sanction of the Board, at a meeting of the RNLI committee of management on 3 August 1865, it was agreed that a new lifeboat was to be placed at Ramsgate. Funding was appropriated from the Bradford Lifeboat Fund, a sum of £425 raised by the efforts of Charles Semon, Mayor of Bradford and eleven other gentlemen, to pay for the cost of the lifeboat, transporting carriage and equipment.

A new lifeboat was ordered from Forrestt of Limehouse. At the same time, whilst the new Ramsgate boat was in construction, another new lifeboat was dispatched to Selsey Lifeboat Station, and their old 29-foot lifeboat Friend was transferred to Ramsgate, both boats transported free of charge between London and Chichester by the London, Brighton and South Coast Railway. In lieu of the new lifeboat not to be exhibited in Bradford, the committee of the Bradford Lifeboat Fund requested via letter from Charles Semon, Mayor, that an exact model be supplied, to be permanently exhibited to the subscribers of Bradford, which was agreed.

A 40-foot Self-righting 'Pulling and Sailing' (P&S) lifeboat, one with both sail and (12) oars, was towed to her station from London by the Ramsgate steam tug Aid in February 1866. The lifeboat was named Bradford, and was the first of four Bradford lifeboats at Ramsgate.

During the evacuation of troops from Dunkirk in 1940, Ramsgate lifeboat Prudential (ON 697) was the first little ship to the rescue. The lifeboat left Ramsgate at 14.20 in the afternoon with Coxswain Howard Primrose Knight in command with her own crew of eight men. They had been issued with gas masks, steel helmets and the lifeboat was loaded with four coils of grass warp and cans of fresh water for the troops. She took in tow eight boats, most of them wherries, manned by eighteen naval men, and when she reached Dunkirk her role was to tow the wherries between the beaches and the waiting ships. In total she rescued 2,800 troops from the beaches. For his 'gallantry and determination,' Coxswain Howard Knight was awarded the Distinguished Service Medal.

The Ramsgate-class lifeboat Prudential, on service since 1925, and the first motor-powered lifeboat on station at Ramsgate, was one of four lifeboats that took part in the Coronation Review of the Fleet by the Queen at Portsmouth on 15 June 1953.

== Station honours ==
The following are awards made at Ramsgate.

- Distinguished Service Medal
  Howard Primrose Cooper Knight, Coxswain - 1940
- RNLI Gold Medal
  Charles Edward Fish, Coxswain – 1881
  Charles Edward Fish, Coxswain – 1891 (Second-Service clasp)
- RNIPLS Silver Medal
  William Miller, Boatman – 1826
  Capt. Edward Gimar, of the French Brig Le Norman – 1829
- RNLI Silver Medal
  James Hogbin, Coxswain – 1857
  Isaac Jarman, Coxswain – 1864
  Isaac Jarman, Coxswain – 1870 (Second-Service clasp)
  Charles Edward Fish, Bowman – 1870
  Daniel Reading, Master of Ramsgate Harbour Steam Tug Vulcan – 1872
  James Simpson, Mate of the Ramsgate Harbour Tug Aid – 1874
  William Wharrier, Engineer of the Ramsgate Harbour Tug Aid – 1874
  Richard Goldsmith, Second Coxswain – 1881
  Henry Belsey, crew member – 1881
  David Berry, crew member – 1881
  Thomas Cooper Snr. crew member – 1881
  Thomas Cooper Jnr. crew member – 1881
  Thomas Friend, crew member – 1881
  John Goldmith, crew member – 1881
  Stephen Goldsmith, crew member – 1881
  Henry Meader, crew member – 1881
  Robert Penney, crew member – 1881
  Charles Verion, crew member – 1881
  Master and crew of the Ramsgate tug Vulcan
  Alfred Page, Master – 1881
  William Wharrier, Engineer – 1881 (Second-Service clasp)
  William Austen, crew member – 1881
  Charles Knight, crew member – 1881
  Edward Revell, crew member – 1881
  George Woodward, Stoker – 1881
  Richard Yare, Stoker – 1881
  William Wharrier, Engineer of Ramsgate Harbour Tugs – 1890 (Third-Service clasp)
  Alfred Page, Tug Master – 1892 (Second-Service clasp)
  The crew of the smack Britain's Pride of Ramsgate
  Thomas James Watson – 1892
  William Burton – 1892
  Edwin Hurle – 1892
  Arthur E. Fisher – 1892
  Alfred Page, Tug Master – 1898 (Third-Service clasp)
  John Hawkins, Harbour Boatman – 1906
  William Cooper, Coxswain – 1916
  Thomas William Read, Second Coxswain – 1917
  Ronald Nicholas Cannon, Coxswain/Mechanic – 1986
  Ronald Nicholas Cannon, Coxswain/Mechanic – 2000 (Second-Service clasp)
- Silver Medal, awarded by The King of Denmark
  Coxswain William Cooper – 1911
  The Master of the Ramsgate Tug Aid – 1911
- RNLI Bronze Medal
  Douglas Stephen Kirkaldie, Coxswain – 1952
- Royal Harbour Ramsgate (Indian Chief) Medal for Conspicuous Gallantry
  Charles Fish, Coxswain – 1881
  Richard Goldsmith, crew member – 1881
  Henry Belsey, crew member – 1881
  David Berry, crew member – 1881
  Thomas Cooper Snr. crew member – 1881
  Thomas Cooper Jnr. crew member – 1881
  Thomas Friend, crew member – 1881
  John Goldmith, crew member – 1881
  Stephen Goldsmith, crew member – 1881
  Henry Meader, crew member – 1881
  Robert Penney, crew member – 1881
  Charles Vernon, crew member – 1881
  Master and crew of the tug Vulcan
  Alfred Page, Master – 1881
  William Wharrier, crew member – 1881
  William Austen, crew member – 1881
  Charles Knight, crew member – 1881
  Edward Revell, crew member – 1881
  George Woodward, crew member – 1881
  Richard Yare, crew member – 1881
- The Maud Smith Award
  (for the bravest act of lifesaving during the year by a member of a lifeboat crew)
  Douglas Stephen Kirkaldie. Coxswain – 1952
  Ronald Nicholas Cannon, Coxswain/Mechanic – 1985
  Ronald Nicholas Cannon, Coxswain/Mechanic – 1999
- Lady Swaythling Trophy
  awarded by The Shipwrecked Fishermen and Mariners' Royal Benevolent Society
  Ronald Nicholas Cannon, Coxswain/Mechanic – 2000
- James Michael Bower Endowment Fund Award
  as one of the two Silver Medal awardees of 1999
  Ronald Nicholas Cannon, Coxswain/Mechanic – 2000
- The Thanks of the Institution inscribed on Vellum
  Thomas J. H. Cooper, Coxswain – 1968
  Michael Petts, crew member – 1975
  Timothy Hurst, crew member – 1975
  Coxswain and Launch Seaman of the Trinity House Pilot Vessel Versatile
  Malcolm H. R. Llewellyn – 1980
  Bryan L. E. Morgan – 1980
  Timothy E. Hurst, Helm – 1985
  Timothy Hurst, Emergency Mechanic – 2000
  Lance Oran, crew member – 2000
- A Framed Letter of Thanks signed by the Chairman of the Institution
  R. Cannon, Coxswain/Mechanic – 1983
  D. Pegden, Second Coxswain/Assistant Mechanic – 1983
  D. Cooper, Emergency Mechanic – 1983
  W. Blay, crew member – 1983
  T. Brown, crew member – 1983
  T. Hurst, crew member – 1983
  Ronald Nicholas Cannon, Coxswain/Mechanic – 1984
  D. Pegden, 2nd Coxswain/Assistant Mechanic – 1984
  T. Hurst, crew member – 1984
  M. Mett, crew member – 1984
  N. Stephens, crew member – 1984
  R. Noble, crew member – 1984
  Timothy Hurst, crew member – 1984
  Ronald Nicholas Cannon, Coxswain/Mechanic – 2000
  Christopher Andrews, Helm – 2008
  Harvey Cole, crew member – 2008
  John Rabbatts, crew member – 2008
- Inscribed Silver Plaques
  awarded by the Prudential Assurance Co., donors of the lifeboat, in recognition of the Dunkirk service
  Coxswain and Crew – 1940
- Awarded by Thomas Woodrow Wilson, President of the United States of America
  Gold watch to the Coxswain – 1919
  Binoculars to the Second Coxswain – 1919
  Gold Medals to the Lifeboat Crew – 1919
- Member, Order of the British Empire (MBE)
  Ronald Nicholas Cannon, Retired Coxswain/Mechanic – 2017QBH

== Roll of honour ==
In memory of those lost whilst serving Ramsgate lifeboat.

- Lost when washed overboard, whilst on service to the barge Sarpsborg of Norway, 2 February 1873
  William White, crew member

=== All-weather lifeboat gallery ===
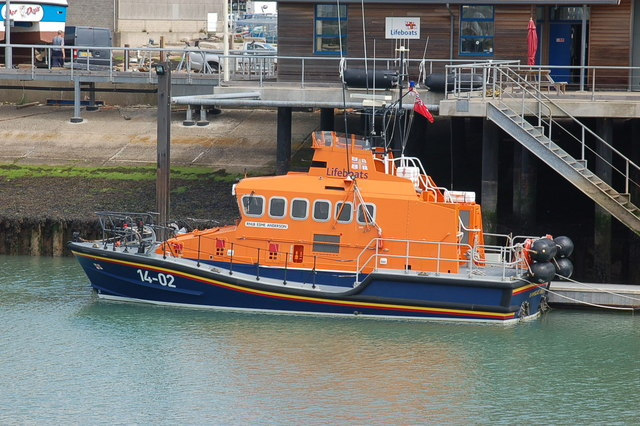
Trent-class lifeboat 14-02 Esme Anderson (ON 1197) at Ramsgate, 11 August 2009

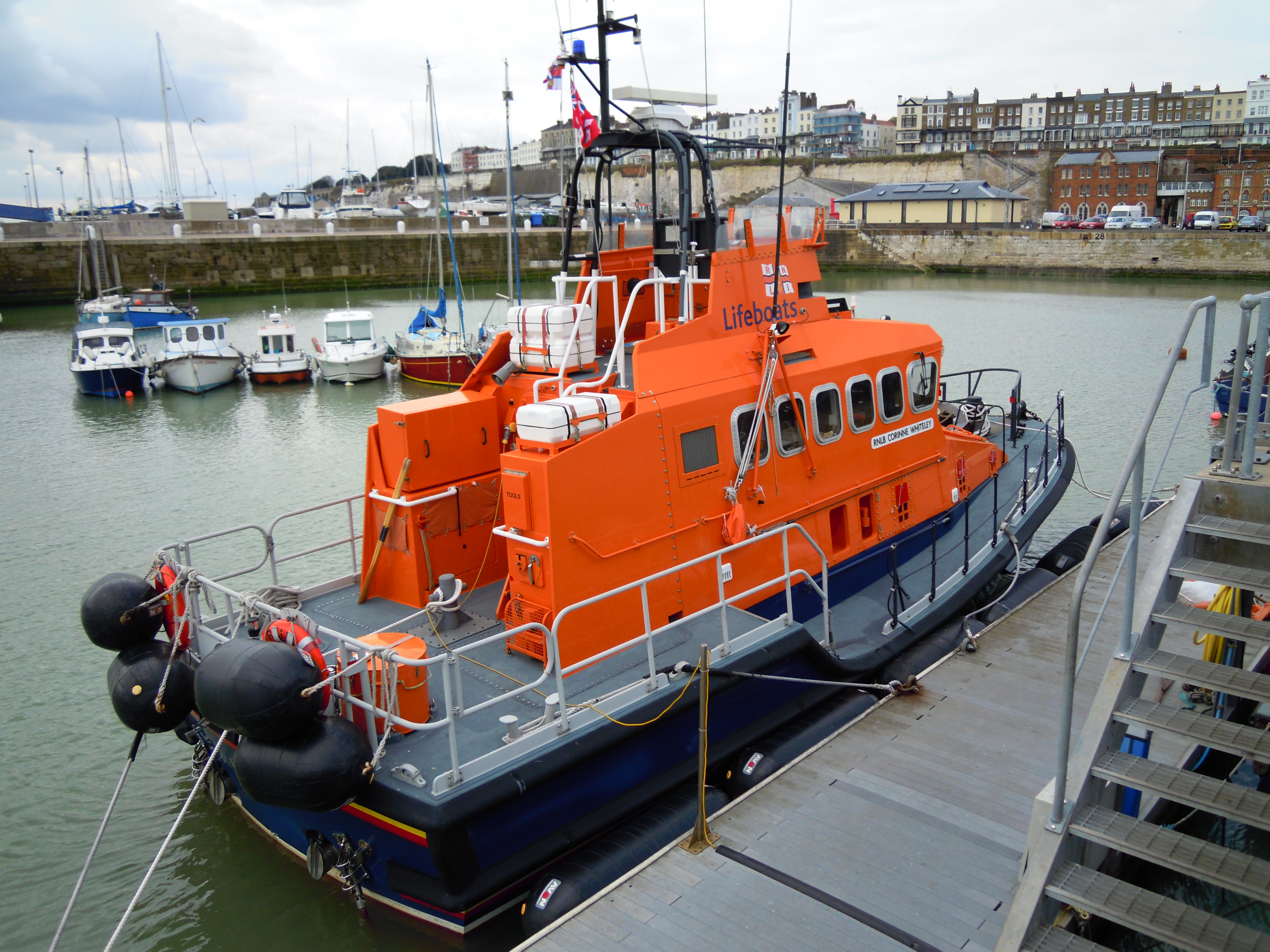
Trent-class relief lifeboat 14-32 Corinne Whiteley (ON 1253) at Ramsgate, 4 April 2010

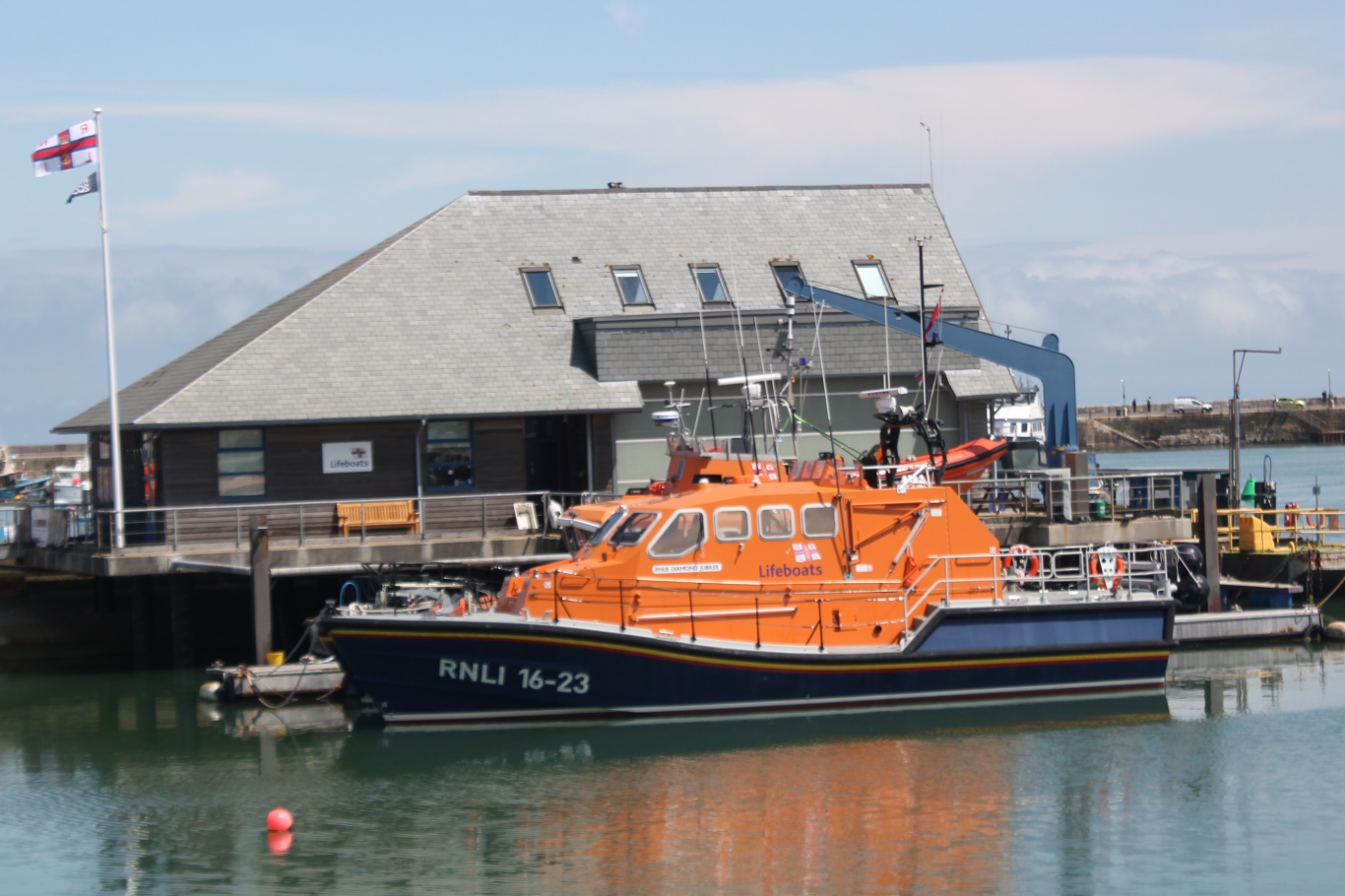
Tamar-class lifeboat 16-23 Diamond Jubilee (ON 1303) at Ramsgate, 25 May 2024

== Ramsgate lifeboats ==
=== Pulling and Sailing (P&S) lifeboats ===
ON (Note: ON is the RNLI's Official Number of the boat.)	Name	Built	On station	Class	Comments
–	Unnamed	1802	1802–1824	Greathead	(Note: Greathead-class lifeboat, of unknown dimensions, built by Henry Greathead of South Shields.)
Station Closed 1824–1851
–	Northumberland	1851	1851–1865	36-foot Beeching Self-Righting	(Note: 36-foot x 9-foot 6in (12-oared) Beeching-class self-righting (P&S) lifeboat, built by James Beeching of Great Yarmouth, costing £250.)
Pre-287	Friend	1854	1865–1866	35-foot Peake Self-righting (P&S)	(Note: 35-foot x 8-foot 2in (12-oared) Peake-class self-righting (P&S) lifeboat, legacy of Mr C. K Corker of Ramsgate, built by Forrestt of Limehouse, London, costing £143 when new. Previously 29-foot 1in x 7-foot 9in (10-oared). Lengthened in 1860); Previously at Skerries and Selsey. Broken up in 1867.
Pre-478	Bradford	1866	1866–1877	40-foot Self-Righting (P&S)	(Note: 40-foot x 10-foot (12-oared) self-righting (P&S) lifeboat, gift of the City of Bradford LB fund, built by Forrestt of Limehouse, London, costing £400.); Specially designed for towing. Damaged 6 November 1877. Sold in 1877
Pre-619	Bowman	1877	1877	35-foot Self-righting (P&S)	(Note: 35-foot x 9-foot (10-oared) self-righting (P&S) lifeboat, anonymous gift of 'A.B.S', via Mrs Sharp of South Kensington, built by Woolfe of Shadwell, London, costing £433.); Temporary cover at Ramsgate, before assignment to Yealm River.
Pre-623	Bradford	1877	1877–1887	44-foot Self-Righting (P&S)	(Note: 44-foot x 11-foot 1in (12-oared) self-righting (P&S) lifeboat, gift of the City of Bradford LB fund, built by Woolfe of Shadwell, London, costing £575.); Broken up in 1887.
117	Bradford	1887	1887–1893	40-foot Self-Righting (P&S)	(Note: 40-foot x 10-foot (12-oared) self-righting (P&S) lifeboat, gift of the City of Bradford LB fund, built by Forrestt of Limehouse, London, costing £843.); Transferred to the relief fleet. Sold and broken up in 1898.
350	Bradford	1893	1893–1905	42-foot Self-Righting (P&S)	(Note: 42-foot x 11-foot (12-oared) self-righting (P&S) lifeboat, gift of the City of Bradford LB fund, built by Woolfe of Shadwell, London, costing £896.); Transferred to the relief fleet. Received a motor conversion. Later at Seaton Snook.
537	Charles and Susanna Stephens	1904	1905–1925	43-foot Self-Righting (P&S)	(Note: 43-foot x 12-foot (10-oared) self-righting (P&S) lifeboat, gift of Mrs C. Stephens of Reading, built by Thames Ironworks of Blackwall, London, costing £1,835.); Transferred to the Relief fleet. Sold in 1931

Pre ON numbers are unofficial numbers used by the Lifeboat Enthusiasts' Society to reference early lifeboats not included on the official RNLI list.

=== Motor lifeboats ===
ON	Op. No. (Note: Op. No. is the RNLI's Operational Number of the boat carried on the hull.)	Name	Built	On station	Class	Comments
697	–	Prudential	1925	1925–1953	Ramsgate	Sold in 1953. Renamed Trimilia. Last reported at Ipswich Haven Marine, October 2023.
901	–	Michael and Lily Davis	1953	1953–1976	46-foot 9in Watson	Transferred to the Relief fleet.
1042	44-016	Ralph and Joy Swann	1976	1976–1990	Waveney	Transferred to Tobermory.
1154	47-036	Kenneth Thelwall II	1989	1990–1994	Tyne	Transferred to Walton and Frinton
1197	14-02	Esme Anderson	1994	1994–2023	Trent	Transferred to Eastbourne
1303	16-23	Diamond Jubilee	2012	2023–	Tamar	

More post-service details can be found on the respective lifeboat class pages.

=== Inshore lifeboats ===
==== A-class ====
Op. No.	Name	On station	Class	Comments
17-01	Unnamed	1969–1971	A-class (Dory)	
A-502	Unnamed	1972–1975	A-class (Hatch)	Previously 17-003
A-510	Unnamed	1975–1984	A-class (McLachlan)	

==== B-class ====
Op. No.	Name	On station	Class	Comments
B-558	Ramsgate Enterprise	1984–2000	B-class (Atlantic 21)	
B-765	Bob Turnbull	2000–2014	B-class (Atlantic 75)	
B-878	Claire & David Delves	2014–	B-class (Atlantic 85)	

== See also ==
- List of RNLI stations
- List of former RNLI stations
- Royal National Lifeboat Institution lifeboats
