= Dory-class lifeboat =

Inshore lifeboat class of the RNLI

Class overview
- Name: Dell Quay Dory
- Builders: Dell Quay Productions of Itchenor
- Operators: Royal National Lifeboat Institution
- Preceded by: Hatch-class
- Succeeded by: McLachlan-class, Atlantic 21
- Built: 1968–1969
- In service: 1968–1985
- Completed: 3
- Retired: 3

General characteristics
- Length: 17 ft 0 in (5.18 m)
- Beam: 7 ft (2.1 m)
- Draught: 8 inches (200 mm) / 18 inches (460 mm) (motor raised / lowered)
- Propulsion: Twin outboard, 36-hp Volvo-Penta, 40-hp Evinrude B16, or Mercury
- Speed: 25 knots (29 mph; 46 km/h)
- Range: 110 miles (180 km) est.
- Complement: 2

The Dory-class lifeboat, also known as a Dell Quay Dory, was one of a group of rigid-hull Inshore lifeboats, developed after the success of the smaller D-class Inshore lifeboats, operated by the Royal National Lifeboat Institution (RNLI) of the United Kingdom and Ireland. The lifeboats, re-designated as A-class lifeboats in 1972, operated from 1968 to 1985.

== History ==
Following the success of the introduction of small fast D-class (RFD PB16) Inshore lifeboats in 1963, it was quickly seen that a larger class of Inshore boat would bridge the gap between the smaller D-class, and the standard All-weather lifeboats. These boats would have a rigid hull, capable of being moored afloat, and offering the option of being a boarding boat, but still be fast, and easy to launch. The first of these was the Hatch-class lifeboat in 1966.

The following year, what was considered a far superior lifeboat was put into service. The McLachlan-class Inshore lifeboat was designed by naval architect J. Allen McLachlan MRINA, partner at longtime yacht and lifeboat designers G. L. Watson & Co. of Glasgow.

However, the RNLI was still evaluating other options for a fast rigid-hull craft, and in 1968, commissioned three commercially available boats from Dell Quay Productions of Itchenor in West Sussex, based on their shallow draught Dory made of GRP.

On 19 August 1968, the lifeboat was demonstrated to the press at Warsash on the River Hamble in Hampshire. It was the first RNLI lifeboat with a GRP hull. However, the McLachlan-class was still seen as a superior boat, and no more Dorys were ordered. The boat did find favour at Poole Lifeboat Station, with the shallow draught proving particularly useful in Poole Harbour. The last of the three boats was withdrawn from service at Poole in 1985.

== Specification ==
The 17 ft (5.2 m) boats had a strengthened GRP hull for RNLI use, allowing it to be initially fitted with an aluminium steering console, with an option for GRP consoles if production continued.

A solid plywood transom was bonded to the hull, for mounting twin outboard engines. Engines trialled include the 36-hp Volvo-Penta, Mercury or 40-hp Evinrude B12. Twin 18 imp gal (82 L) fuel tanks were fitted under the console. Each engine had a manual start to reduce complication, and separate steering cables allowing the boat to operate on one engine.

One of the major features was the shallow draught, at just 8 inches (200 mm) or 18 inches (460 mm), with engines raised or lowered. The boat had a top speed of 25 knots (46 km/h; 29 mph) and a range of 110 miles (180 km) (est.).

In 1972, it was decided to reclassify the 17 and 18-foot boats from Offshore lifeboats to Inshore A-class lifeboats, and their numbers were changed according; 17-001 becoming A-500 etc.

== Fleet ==
All of the following fleet details are referenced to the 2026 Lifeboat Enthusiasts' Society Handbook, with information retrieved directly from RNLI records.

Old Op.No.	Op.No. (Note: Op.No. is the RNLI's Operational Number of the boat carried on the hull.)	Name	Built	In service	Station	Comments
17-01	A-500	Unnamed	1968	1968–1969	Eastney	Sold in 1974.
17-01	A-500	Unnamed	1968	1969–1971	Ramsgate	Sold in 1974.
17-01	A-500	Unnamed	1968	1972–1973	Poole	Sold in 1974.
17-002	A-501	Bob Abbott	1969	1969–1973	Lyme Regis	Sold in 1975.
17-002	A-501	Bob Abbott	1969	1974–1975	Poole	Sold in 1975.
17-002	A-501	Bob Abbott	1969	1975–????	Relief fleet	Sold in 1975.
17-003	A-502	Unnamed	1969	1969–1972	Poole	Sold in 1985
17-003	A-502	Unnamed	1969	1972–1975	Ramsgate	Sold in 1985
17-003	A-502	Unnamed	1969	1975–1985	Poole	Sold in 1985

== See also ==
- List of RNLI stations
- List of former RNLI stations
- Royal National Lifeboat Institution lifeboats
