= Lyme Regis Lifeboat Station =

RNLI lifeboat station in Dorset, England

- Flag of the RNLI

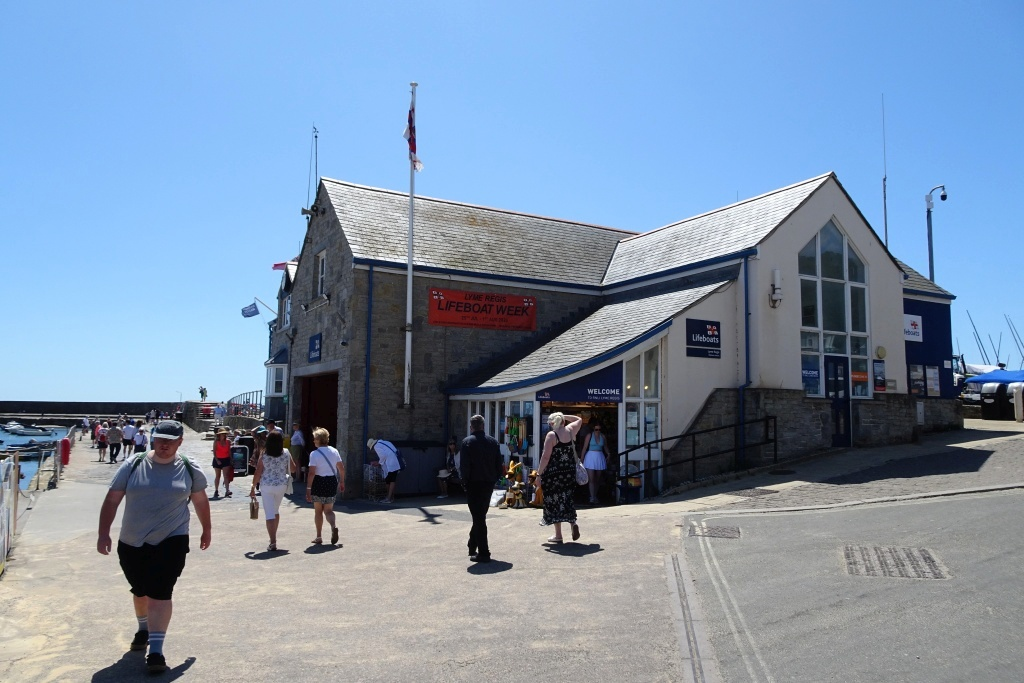
- Lyme Regis Lifeboat Station in 2025

- Location within Dorset

General information
- Type: Lifeboat station
- Location: The Cobb, Lyme Regis, Dorset, DT7 3JJ, United Kingdom
- Coordinates: 50.7204°N 2.9389°W
- Opened: 1997; 29 years ago
- Owner: Royal National Lifeboat Institution

Website
- Lyme Regis RNLI Lifeboat Station

Lyme Regis Lifeboat Station can be found on The Cobb, at the head of the harbour in Lyme Regis, a seaside resort approximately 23 miles (37 km) due west of the county town of Dorchester, on the Jurassic coast of the county of Dorset, England.

A lifeboat was first placed at Lyme Regis in 1825. The station was re-established by the Royal National Institution for the Preservation of Life from Shipwreck (RNIPLS) in September 1853.

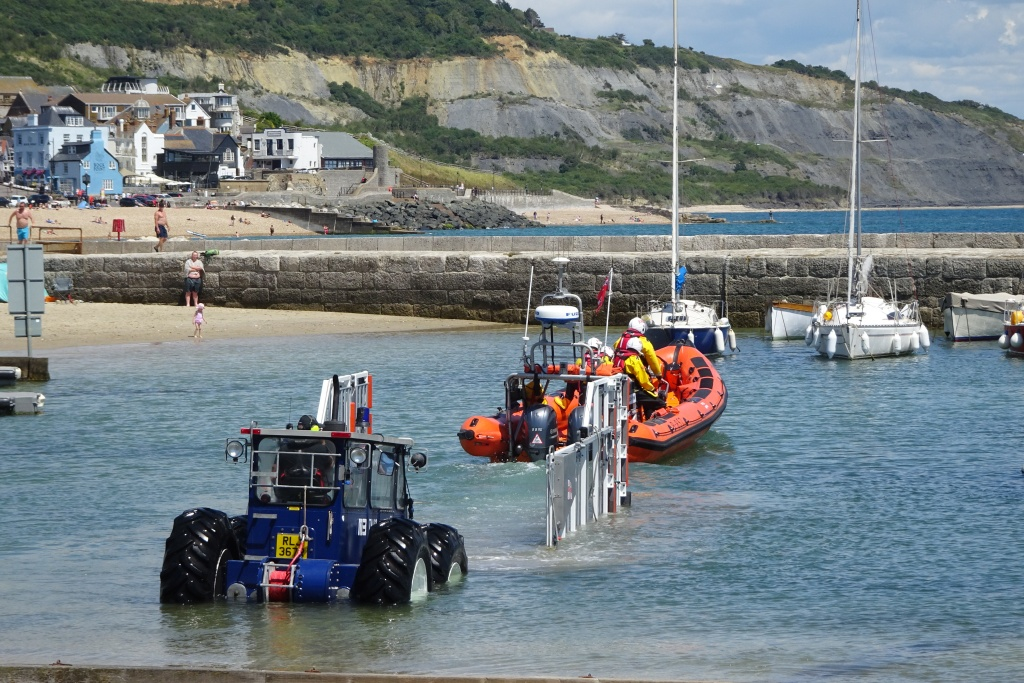
B-class (Atlantic 85) Spirit of Loch Fyne (B-857) during launch

The station currently operates a B-class (Atlantic 85) Inshore lifeboat, Spirit of Loch Fyne (B-857), on station since 2012.

== History ==
Ever since its founding in 1824, the RNIPLS, later to become the RNLI in 1854, would award medals for deeds of gallantry at sea, even if no lifeboats were involved.

On 23 November 1824, the brig Unity was wrecked between Lyme Regis and Charmouth, For their efforts to rescue the Master, two crew men, and a boy, Capt. Charles Cowper Benett, RN was awarded the RNIPLS Gold Medal. William Porter and John Freeman each received the RNIPLS Silver Medal.

Following this incident, Capt. Richard Spencer, RN, Officer of the Coastguard, with the assistance of the RNIPLS, fitted one or two local fishing boats with air-tight boxes and cork fenders in 1825, so that they could be used as lifeboats if the need was to arise again. Records show one boat operated only until 1827.

At a meeting of the committee of the RNIPLS on 16 September 1852, a letter was received from Capt. Willoughby of Lyme Regis, highlighting the need for a lifeboat. It was resolved that a lifeboat station would be established in the town.

However, before it arrived, the emigrant barque Heroine was wrecked off Beer Head on 26 December 1852. Two ship's boats, carrying 44 passengers and crew from the wreck, were spotted near Lyme Cobb. A boat from the Revenue Cutter Frances was launched to their assistance, with three crew, plus two men from other boats. Four of the men drowned when the boat capsized. The sole survivor, William Bridle, Master of the Primrose, was awarded the RNIPLS Silver Medal for his gallantry. The two boats from the Heroine made it to shore with no incident.

In 1853, a lifeboat station was established at Lyme Regis, the cost shared between the RNIPLS and local subscription. A 27-foot-long (8.2 m) self-righting 'Pulling and Sailing' (P&S) lifeboat, one with sails and (eight) oars, based on the design of Mr Peake, and costing £137, was sent to Lyme Regis in September 1853. The boat was transported to her station free of charge, shipped to Plymouth aboard the British and Irish Steam Packet Company steamer Nile, and then towed to Lyme Regis by the Revenue Cruiser.

Only a few months later, on 7 January 1854., the lifeboat capsized, on service to the Jeune Rose, on passage from Libourne, Gironde to Dunkirk. Crew member and coastguard Henry Martin was lost, but the crew of the Jeune Rose were rescued.

The first proper lifeboat at Lyme Regis had been replaced in 1860, by one constructed, and operated, at Penzance since 1852. This boat was condemned in 1866. Both these boats had been kept in an "inconvenient" shed, under a sail loft. Now with the gift of £1000 from an anonymous lady, 'H.W.' via the Manchester branch of the Institution, the opportunity to refurbish the station was taken, and a new boathouse was constructed, at a cost of £226-10s. Both old and new lifeboats were conveyed between London and Axminster by the London and South Western Railway Company at no charge. On arrival in Lyme Regis, the new 33 ft (10 m) lifeboat was taken in procession through the town, before being named William Woodcock (ON 214), and launched on demonstration, its performance of great satisfaction to the crew.

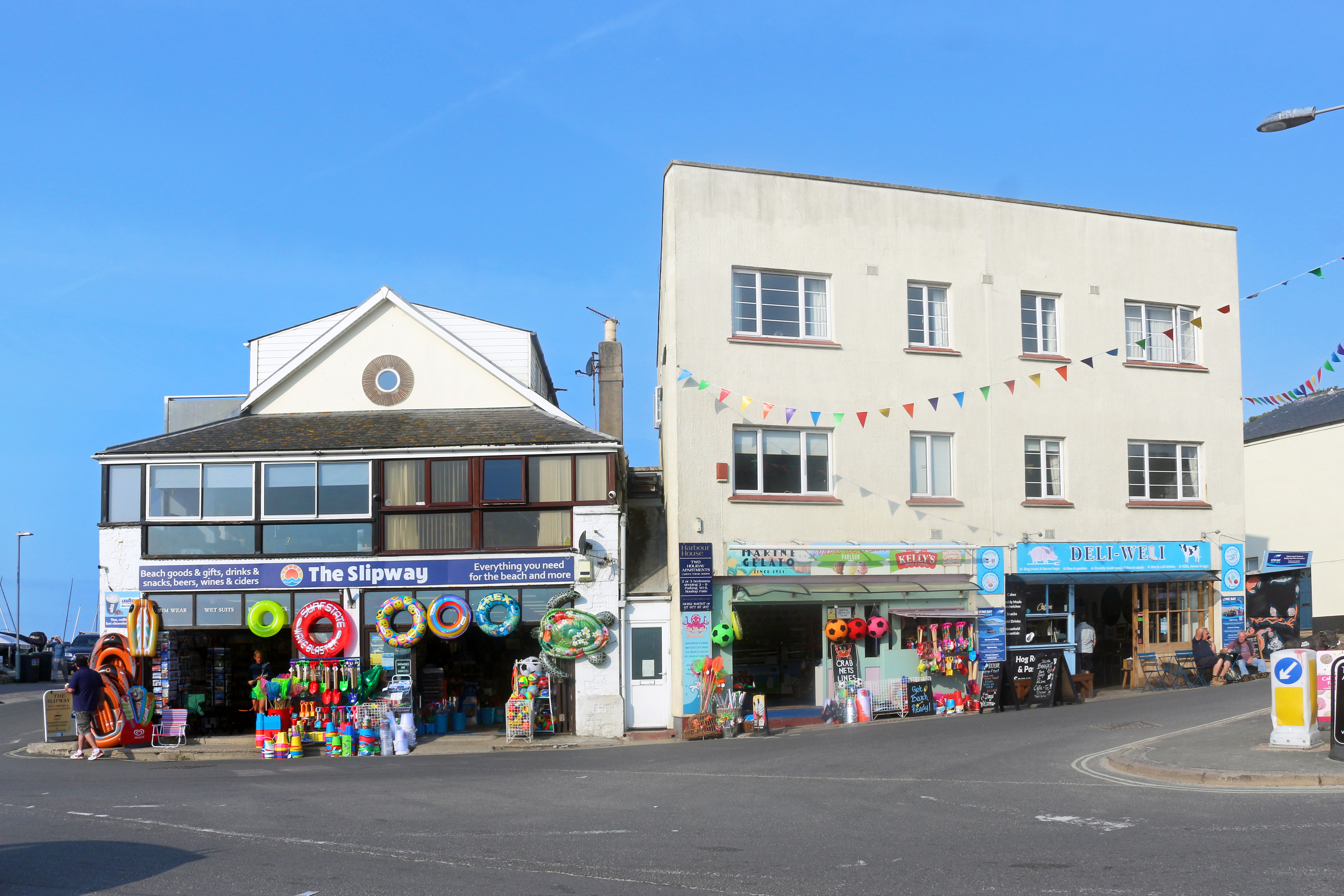
The gable end of 1884 station can still be seen on the left

In 1883, an agreement was reached with a Lyme Regis landowner, with the old boathouse and £250 traded for a new site nearer to the harbour. A new boathouse was constructed and completed in 1884, for an additional £315-4s-11d.

By 1932, motor-powered lifeboats were already operating from Torbay and Weymouth, with another one due for Exmouth in 1933; the upgrades gradually rendering the slow P&S lifeboats obsolete. At a meeting of the RNLI committee of management on Thursday 13 October 1932, along with stations at Cardigan and Llanddulas, it was decided to close Lyme Regis Lifeboat Station with immediate effect.

Over a period of 79 years, the lifeboat had been launched 30 times, saving 35 lives. The lifeboat on station at the time of closure, Thomas Masterman Hardy (ON 650), was transferred to the relief fleet, later serving at Filey.

== 1960s onwards ==
In 1964, in response to an increasing amount of water-based leisure activity, the RNLI placed 25 small fast Inshore lifeboats around the country. These were easily launched with just a few people, ideal to respond quickly to local emergencies.

More stations were opened, and in May 1967, a lifeboat station was re-established at Lyme Regis, with the arrival of a D-class (RFD PB16) Inshore lifeboat, the unnamed (D-125). The lifeboat immediately proved its worth just one month later on 25 June 1967, when five people, including one requiring resuscitation, were rescued from the capsized cabin cruiser Lilian.
See Robert E. G. Jefford, below:–

A new Dory-class Inshore lifeboat (17-002) was placed at the station in April 1969. The boat was one of a handful of rigid hull Inshore lifeboats introduced in the late 1960s. 17-002, renumbered A-501 in 1972, was named Bob Abbott, in memory of the Robert West Abbott, coxswain of the Lyme Regis lifeboat between 1903 and 1925. This boat was in turn replaced by a B-class (Atlantic 21) in 1973.

In preparation for a new larger Atlantic 75 lifeboat and Talus MB-764 amphibious launch tractor, construction of a new boathouse was started in November 1996. The building was completed in July 1997, proving a larger boat hall, improved crew facilities, and a souvenir outlet. The B-class (Atlantic 75) Inshore lifeboat Pearl of Dorset (B-741) arrived on station on 29 September 1997.

The latest lifeboat at Lyme Regis is the B-class (Atlantic 85) Inshore lifeboat, Spirit of Loch Fyne (B-857), placed on service in 2012. The boat was funded by the Loch Fyne restaurants.

At a ceremony on 13 October 2024 at Lyme Regis Football Club, guest of honour John Hodder, twice recipient of the RNLI bronze medal at Lyme Regis, presented the King Charles III Coronation Medal, to each member of the current lifeboat crew with the requisite five years of service. The proceedings were halted prematurely, when the pagers went off, and the lifeboat was launched to conduct a shoreline search. The crew were stood down, when the casualty was found safe and well.

== John Hodder ==
Helm John Hodder was awarded the RNLI Bronze Medal, for his part in rescuing two boys, in difficulties after taking a dingy out on 14 March 1971. He was in an ordinary boat and not wearing the usual safety gear but still dived into freezing water to effect a rescue.

Hodder was awarded a second-service clasp to his bronze medal, as helm of the ILB, on service to a yacht White Kitten, which was dragging her anchor off Beer Head on 13 August 1979. Crew member Colin Jones also received an RNLI Bronze Medal for his part in the same rescue. All four lifeboat crew members received 'The Ralph Glister Award 1979', for the most meritorious service of the year performed by a rescue boat crew.

Hodder was twice accorded 'The Thanks of the Institution Inscribed on Vellum', first for his part in saving four people from the French yacht Versean on 31 March 1977, and then for rescuing people cut off by the tide on 11 September 1984.

== Robert E. G. Jefford ==
Crew members Robert Jefford and Lionel Harry Fisher were accorded 'The Thanks of the Institution Inscribed on Vellum', for rescuing five people from the capsized cabin cruiser Lilian on 25 June 1967. Just four months later, on 8 October 1967, the ILB was used to take Robert and his bride from church on their wedding day.

In a force 9 south-westerly gale on 17 January 1969, the Inshore lifeboat was launched at 17:50, to the catamaran Karuna, which had broken its moorings in the harbour. On board were Robert Jefford, Roy Gollop and John Chase. Arriving with the catamaran, feeling the full effect of the storm, Gollop went aboard to secure a line, and a tow was set up. With both boats off Cobb Gate, and Gollop still aboard the catamaran, a huge wave capsized the ILB, pitching both occupants into the water.

Attempting to knot a line long enough to throw to Jefford, Gollop was washed off the catamaran. He was subsequently washed ashore, and 19-year-old Graham Turner grabbed a line, and managed to haul John Chase from the water.

A line was thrown to Jefford from the sea wall, but despite the best efforts of all helpers, including Roy Gollop, who was lowered over the wall on a line, a series of heavy waves dashed Jefford against the sea wall. His body was later recovered from the beach about 1 mi (1.6 km) from the town.

Robert Jefford remains to be the only member of an RNLI Inshore lifeboat crew to be lost on service. An RNLI pension was granted to his widow, and his widowed mother.

== Station honours ==
The following are awards made at Lyme Regis:

- RNIPLS Gold Medal
  Capt. Charles Cowper Benett, RN – 1825
- RNIPLS Silver Medal
  William Porter – 1825
  John Freeman – 1825
  William Bridle, Master of the Primrose – 1853
- RNLI Silver Medal
  William Callaway, Seaman – 1856
  Miss Alice Bell Le Geyt, Holidaymaker – 1864
  Lt. William Hallam Elton, RN, H.M. Coastguard, Lyme – 1867
- RNLI Bronze Medal
  John Leslie Hodder, Helm – 1971
  John Leslie Hodder, Helm – 1980 (Second-Service clasp)
  Colin Ian Jones, crew member – 1980
- The Ralph Glister Award 1979
  (for the most meritorious service of the year performed by a rescue boat crew)
  John Hodder, Helm – 1980
  Colin Jones, crew member – 1980
  Paul Wason, crew member – 1980
  Graham Turner, crew member – 1980
- The Thanks of the Institution inscribed on Vellum
  Robert Jefford – 1967
  Lionel Harry Fisher – 1967
  John Hodder, Helm – 1977
  John Hodder, Helm – 1984
- Letters of Thanks signed by the Chairman of the Institution
  Graham Turner – 1969
  Roy Gollop, crew member – 1969
  David Hallett, Deputy Launching Authority – 1971
  J. Bolton, Auxiliary Coastguard – 1971
  The crew of the fishing vessel Barbarella – 1971
  The crew of the fishing vessel Sea Soldier – 1971

== Roll of honour ==
In memory of those lost whilst serving at Lyme Regis:

- Drowned when their small boat capsized, attempting the rescue the crew of the Heroine, 26 December 1852
  T. Black
  H. Cox
  W. Harvey
  H. Hearne
- Lost when the lifeboat capsized whilst on service to a wrecked brig La Jeune Rose, 7 January 1854
  Henry Martin, crew member
- Killed at Burton Bradstock, whilst attempting to rescue the crew of fishing boats being driven ashore in a heavy gale, 29 November 1861
  John Gerrard, Master of the fishing smack Busy
- Drowned when the ILB capsized, on service to the catamaran Karuna, 17 January 1969
  Robert E. G. Jefford, ILB crew member (25)

== Lyme Regis lifeboats ==
=== Pulling and Sailing (P&S) lifeboats ===
On station	ON (Note: ON is the RNLI's Official Number of the boat.)	Name	Built	Class	Comments
1825–1827?	—	(Unknown)	(Unknown)	—	Two unidentified boats.
1853–1860	Pre-267	Unnamed	1853	27-foot Peake Self-righting (P&S)	(Note: 27 ft 0 in (8.23 m) x 7 ft 6 in (2.29 m) (8-oared) Peake-class self-righting (P&S) lifeboat, funded by the RNIPLS, built by Forrestt of Limehouse, London, costing £137.); Sold in 1860.
1860–1866	Pre-268	Unnamed	1852	30-foot Peake Self-righting (P&S)	(Note: 30 ft 0 in (9.14 m) x 8 ft 0 in (2.44 m) (10-oared) Peake-class self-righting (P&S) lifeboat, funded by the RNIPLS, built by Semmens and Thomas of Penzance, costing £150.); Previously at Penzance. Decayed by 1866.
1866–1891	214	William Woodcock	1866	33-foot Peake Self-righting (P&S)	(Note: 33 ft 0 in (10.06 m) x 8 ft 1 in (2.46 m) (10-oared) Peake-class self-righting (P&S) lifeboat, gift of an anonymous lady, 'H.W.' of Manchester, built by Forrestt of Limehouse, London, costing £278.); Sold in 1891.
1891–1915	322	Susan Ashley	1891	34-foot Self-righting (P&S)	(Note: 34 ft 0 in (10.36 m) x 8 ft 0 in (2.44 m) (10-oared) self-righting (P&S) lifeboat, legacy of Mr C. C. Ashley of Menton, France, built by Forrestt of Limehouse, London, costing £425.); Sold in 1915. Renamed Bluebird.
1915–1932	650	Thomas Masterman Hardy	1915	35-foot Self-righting (P&S)	(Note: 35 ft 0 in (10.67 m) x 8 ft 6 in (2.59 m) (10-oared) self-righting (P&S) lifeboat, gift of Mrs J. Thynne of London, built by Saunders of Cowes, costing £1,623.); Transferred to the relief fleet, later at Filey.

Pre ON numbers are unofficial numbers used by the Lifeboat Enthusiasts' Society to reference early lifeboats not included on the official RNLI list.

=== Inshore lifeboats ===
==== D-class ====
On station	Op. No. (Note: Op. No. is the RNLI's Operational Number of the boat or vehicle carried on the hull.)	Name	Class	Comments
1967–1968	D-125	Unnamed	D-class (RFD PB16)	
1969–1970	D-156	Unnamed	D-class (RFD PB16)	First stationed at Mudeford.

==== A-class ====
On station	Op. No.	Name	Class	Comments
1970–1973	17-002	Bob Abbott	A-class (Dory)	Renumbered A-501 in 1972.

==== B-class ====
On station	Op. No.	Name	Class	Comments
1970	B-500	Unnamed	B-class (Atlantic 21)	Prototype lifeboat on trial.
1973	B-501	Unnamed	B-class (Atlantic 21)	
1973–1980	B-512	U.S. Navy League	B-class (Atlantic 21)	
1980–1997	B-546	Independent Forester Benevolence	B-class (Atlantic 21)	
1997–2012	B-741	Pearl of Dorset	B-class (Atlantic 75)	
2012–	B-857	Spirit of Loch Fyne	B-class (Atlantic 85)	

=== Launch and recovery tractors ===
On station	Op. No.	Reg. No.	Type	Comments
1997–2004	TW39	N687 YAW	Talus MB-764 County	
2004–2014	TW02	LRU 581P	Talus MB-764 County	
2014–2023	TW64	HG63 VAO	Talus MB-764 County	
2023–	TW03	RLJ 367R	Talus MB-764 County	

== See also ==
- List of RNLI stations
- List of former RNLI stations
- Royal National Lifeboat Institution lifeboats
