= A-class lifeboat =

Class of RNLI lifeboats

A-class lifeboats are a series of lifeboats operated by the Royal National Lifeboat Institution (RNLI):

Boats in this series include:

- Hatch-class lifeboat, Construction: 1966, Service 1967–1975
- McLachlan-class lifeboat, Construction: 1967–1974, Service 1967–1988
- Dory-class lifeboat, Construction: 1968–1969, Service 1968–1985
- Boston Whaler-class lifeboat, Construction: 1985, Service 1985–1994
