= Yealm River Lifeboat Station =

Former RNLI lifeboat station in Devon, England

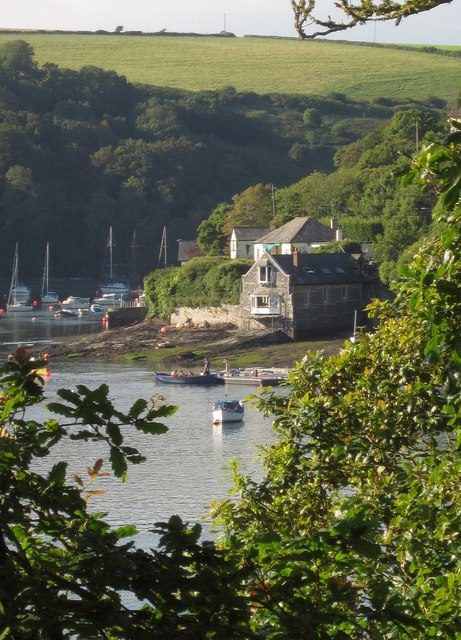
- Former Lifeboat Station, Newton Ferrers

- Newton Ferrers, Devon

General information
- Status: Closed
- Type: RNLI Lifeboat Station
- Location: Old Lifeboat House, Yealm Road, Newton Ferrers, Devon, PL8 1BN, England
- Coordinates: 50°18′51.3″N 4°03′09.5″W
- Opened: 1878
- Closed: 1927

Yealm River Lifeboat Station was located on the east side of the River Yealm estuary at Newton Ferrers, a village approximately 6.4 nautical miles (11.9 km) south-east of Plymouth, on the south east coast of Devon.

A lifeboat station was first established at Newton Ferrers in 1878 by the Royal National Lifeboat Institution (RNLI).

Yealm River lifeboat station was closed in 1927, after Plymouth received a 60-foot Barnett-class twin-screw motor-powered lifeboat, which mean that it could cover the same area without the need for a lifeboat at the Yealm.

== History ==
On the report and recommendation of the Inspector of Lifeboats, following his visit at the invitation of local residents, it was decided at the meeting of the RNLI committee of management on 1 March 1877, to establish a lifeboat station at the mouth of the River Yealm, near Plymouth, and to appropriate to the station, the gift of £800 received from an anonymous donor, 'A. B. S.', with a lifeboat to be named Bowman. "There are plenty of fishermen to man the Life-boat, which can be readily launched in smooth water at all tides and in any wind; while she is in a good windward position for commanding Bigbury Bay in westerly and southwesterly gales, which are the most prevalent ones in this district."

A new stone-built boathouse and slipway was constructed, at a cost of £345, on land granted by Rev. Duke Yonge, MA. A new 35-foot self-righting 'Pulling and Sailing (P&S) lifeboat, one with (10) oars and sails, costing £432-12s, was sent to the station along with its launching carriage. On 27 April 1878, a service of dedication was carried out by the Rev. Yonge, followed by a naming ceremony. The lifeboat, as requested by the donor, was named Bowman, after which it was launched for a demonstration to the assembled crowd.

Two more lifeboats would come to serve at Yealm River. In 1887, a new 34-foot lifeboat arrived on station. This boat was built by Messrs Woolfe & Son in 1887 at the cost of £384.10.0d funded by the legacy of the late Mrs. Thomas, of Nunney, Somerset, and at the donors request the lifeboat was named Darling (ON 163). She was 34-foot 1in long, of a self-righting design, with two masts, standing lugs and jib, and 10 oars. The lifeboat would serve for 17 years during which time five launches took place, but no lives were recorded as being saved.

Darling was replaced in 1904 by the 35-foot Michael Smart (ON 527), costing £800, funded from the legacy of the late Mr. Michael Smart of Tewkesbury, Gloucestershire. She was a self righting boat, 35-foot long with an 8-foot beam and 10 oars double banked. This lifeboat is recorded as having been launched nine times, rescuing two lives..

At a meeting of the RNLI committee of management on 20 January 1927, it was decided to close Yealm River lifeboat station.

The lifeboat station still stands, and is now a private residence. The lifeboat on station at the time of closure, Michael Smart (ON 527), was sold from service in 1927.

== Launches and rescues ==
The following detail some of the key times the Yealm lifeboat was launched.

In a south-west gale on the night of 28 January 1885, both the Plymouth and Yealm River lifeboats were called to the barque Wellington of Windsor, Nova Scotia, which had drifted ashore. The vessel had been taken under tow by the Government tugboat Scotia, following an incident aboard, which had cost the lives of the Captain and two crew, whilst on passage from Le Havre to New York. It seems that the captain "had been drinking freely" and the crew threw two barrels of spirits overboard, as he had been showing signs of insanity. The lifeboats spent several hours transferring lines to and from the tug, until at 04:30 the following morning, the vessel was out of danger, grounded in the Yealm estuary. The River Yealm lifeboat crew were then tasked by the Queen's Harbour Master to guard the crew and vessel, and remained there until 16:00, when the vessel was towed to Plymouth Sound..

On 8 December 1897, the Yealm lifeboat rescued four crew from the three masted brigantine St Pierre of Havre, after their vessel was stranded on the Mewstone in a gale. They escaped the ship to the rocks from where the Yealm lifeboat rescued them. The remainder of the crew was rescued by the coastguard boat from Bovisand..

In April 1898, two crabbers from the Yealm, Myrtle and Seabird, were reported as missing. The lifeboat was launched, but when the mouth of the river was reached, it was impossible to get out, so confused and high was the sea. Harry Hockaday, at that time the second coxswain and son of the coxwain William Hockaday, was attending to the jib, when a fierce squall struck the boat and his hand got entangled. He was being dragged overboard when one of his comrades seized him by the leg and saved him. Sadly, the two crabbers were lost with all hands.

Early on 6 August 1904, a message was received that a sailing barge near Mothecombe was in difficulties. The Michael Smart was launched from Yealm lifeboat station. The barge was taking on water, had lost a rudder, and was dangerously close to the rocks. With the barge considered to be taking on too much water for salvage, the exhausted crew were taken into the lifeboat, and landed back at Yealm Harbour..

After sunset on 29 August 1909, the Coastguard on Wembury Cliffs reported a small light on the Mewstone. The Michael Smart was launched at 22.20 in a strong westerly breeze. They found a small boat sheltering in a cove on the lee side of the island. One crew member had remained in the boat, with the other two having gone ashore, and attracted attention by striking matches. All three were rescued and the boat towed back to harbour..

The SS Veghstroom was heading from Fowey to its home port of Amsterdam with a cargo of china clay, when it stranded on the Mewstone on 21 November 1914. The Michael Smart lifeboat from the Yealm was launched, along with the Plymouth lifeboat. Some of the lifeboat crew boarded the vessel and the boats remained in attendance through the night. The Veghstroom floated off at 07:30, and when it was found that the pumps could keep the leakage under control, the vessel proceeded on its voyage and the lifeboats returned to their stations.. The SS Veghtstroom only survived until 1917, when it was torpedoed by German submarine UC-47 off North Cornwall.

== Coxswains, crew and secretaries ==
RNLI historical records only note two known coxswains for the Yealm lifeboat. These were W. Hockaday whose start of tenure is unknown, but was replaced in 1898 by Henry Hockaday who served until the station closed in 1927 when he was awarded a certificate of service and a pension. Joseph Williams retired at the same time after eight years service and received a gratuity..

The honorary secretaries of the Yealm Lifeboat station were as shown by the table below.

Name	Period	Awards
Ralph Dawson	1878–1882	
N Williams	1882–1891	
John Yonge	1891–1914	
C. F. Oakley	1914–1923	Thanks of the Institution inscribed on Vellum
Sydney J. Ching	1924–1927	

The last surviving crew member of the Yealm lifeboat was Edgar Foster who died in Autumn 1991..

== Yealm River lifeboats ==
ON (Note: ON is the RNLI's Official Number of the boat.)	Name	Built	On station	Class	Comments
Pre-619	Bowman	1877	1878−1887	35-foot Self-righting (P&S)	(Note: 35-foot x 9-foot (10-oared) self-righting (P&S) lifeboat, anonymous gift of 'A.B.S.', via Mrs Sharp of South Kensington, built by Woolfe of Shadwell, London, costing £433.); Previously at Ramsgate.
163	Darling	1887	1887−1904	34-foot Self-righting (P&S)	(Note: 34-foot x 8-foot (10-oared) self-righting (P&S) lifeboat, legacy of Mrs Thomas of Nunney, Somerset, built by Woolfe of Shadwell, London, costing £385.)
527	Michael Smart	1904	1904−1927	35-foot Self-righting (P&S)	(Note: 35-foot x 8-foot 6in (10-oared) self-righting (P&S) lifeboat, legacy of Mr M. Smart of Tewkesbury, built by Thames Ironworks of Blackwall, London, costing £819.); Sold for private use and converted to be a motor cruiser.

Pre ON numbers are unofficial numbers used by the Lifeboat Enthusiast Society to reference early lifeboats not included on the official RNLI list.

== See also ==
- List of RNLI stations
- List of former RNLI stations
- Independent lifeboats in Britain and Ireland
