= Royal National Lifeboat Institution lifeboats =

Lifeboats in the United Kingdom

Since its inception, the Royal National Lifeboat Institution (RNLI) has provided lifeboats to lifeboat stations in the United Kingdom and Ireland.

Once past their operational life, the boats have mostly been sold by the RNLI and purchased for domestic use, marine businesses for usage such as further sea lifesaving functions, diving, fishing and pleasure trips or to maritime lifesaving institutions from other countries to continue a lifesaving role. Some lifeboats of particular historic note have been preserved in museums.

== History ==
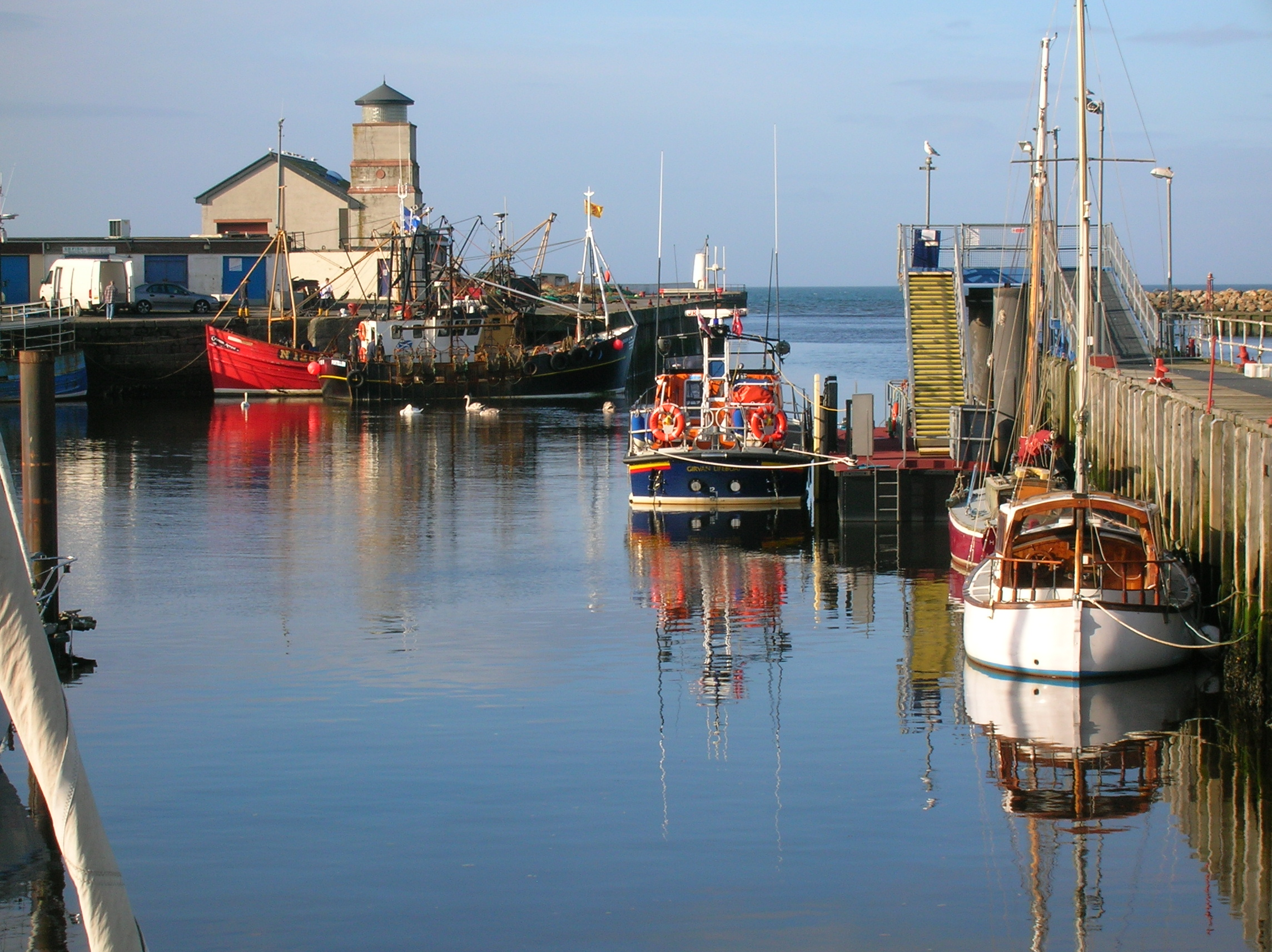
Girvan harbour and lifeboat

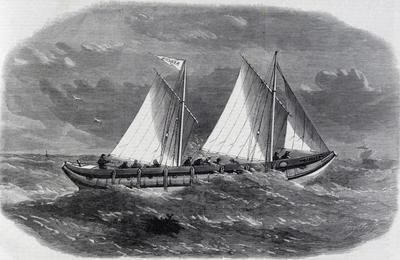
An 1863 tubular lifeboat from New Brighton, Merseyside

The Royal National Institution for the Preservation of Life from Shipwreck (RNIPLS) was founded in March 1824. The RNIPLS provided lifeboats to local committees, the Coastguard and harbour authorities. The Duke of Northumberland financed a competition for a standard design of a lifeboat. The winner was William Plenty, of Newbury, Berkshire. These "pulling boats" (rowing) were between 18 and 26 feet in length and were powered by between 4 and 10 oars. They had cork in their hull and shaped air-cases fore and aft. Their double-ended designs could operate a rudder from either end, so there was no need to turn.

The RNIPLS suffered from lack of funds and poor organization. Following the loss of the RNIPLS lifeboat Providence and 20 of her crew of 24 in the mouth of the river Tyne in December 1849, the need for reorganisation was recognised. Algernon Percy, 4th Duke of Northumberland, then First Lord of the Admiralty, took control. Richard Lewis was appointed secretary. The RNIPLS was replaced by the RNLI. Plenty's design was retired and a new design was introduced. These were larger, self-righting boats. They had a narrow beam, were 34 or 35 feet long with higher end-boxes containing the air-cases and were tested to self-right when capsized.

Later lifeboats were increased in length and were optionally powered by sail. Motors were introduced in the early 1900s. They had a greater range, facilitating the merging of lifeboat stations. Innovation in the design of lifeboats is continuous.

In 1962 the need for inshore lifeboats (ILB) was recognised. A French design was adopted, this was an inflatable of 16 foot length and a 40 hp engine with a speed of 20 knots and introduced as the D Class. It was faster than conventional lifeboats, at that time, could traverse shallow waters, go alongside persons in the water without harming them, and the running costs were much less than conventional lifeboats. In 1972 a rigid inflatable boat (RIB) was developed at Atlantic College in South Wales and introduced as the B Class Atlantic 21.

== Current lifeboats ==
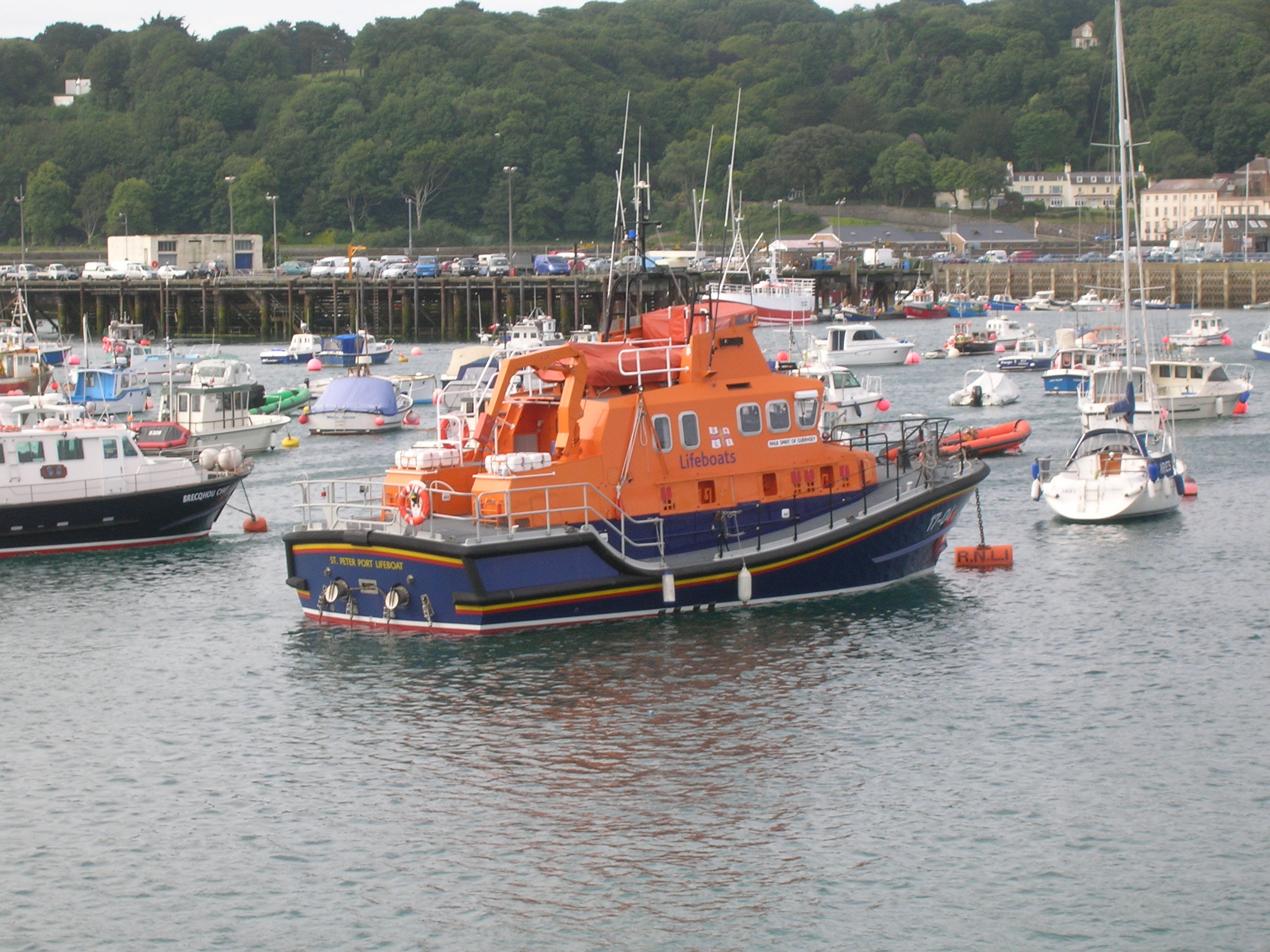
Severn-class RNLI Spirit of Guernsey at St Peter Port

The RNLI operated 431 lifeboats in 2022.

Class	In service
Mersey	11
Severn	41
Shannon	40
Tamar	27
Trent	33
A-class IRB	3
B-class ILB	122
D-class ILB	143
E-class ILB	4
H-class hovercraft	7

A number of other craft are also in operation including personal watercraft, boarding boats and Y-class tenders.

The Severn-class are undergoing life extension and the Mersey-class are being replaced by newly-built Shannons.

== List of lifeboat classes ==
=== Pulling and sailing lifeboats ===
The first lifeboats were powered by oars and most, except a few very early ones, had sails. A few were rebuilt with petrol engines after 1904.

Class	Build period	Total built	Typical length	Self-righting	Notes
Beeching	1851		36 ft (11 m)	Yes	Winner of the RNLI's design competition in 1851, the design was quickly developed into the Peake-class.
Cromer	1884–1895	3	35 ft (11 m)	No	Designed for the Norfolk Shipwreck Association at Cromer before they became part of the RNLI in 1857. Also used at several other nearby stations and the RNLI built three replacements for them to a similar design.
Greathead	1790–1804	23	40 ft (12 m)	No	The first widely-adopted lifeboats were based on Henry Greathead's Original design. They were double-ended and fitted with cork buoyancy aids. At least one remained in service for 40 years to be withdrawn by the RNLI. They are sometimes referred to as the 'North Country lifeboat'.
Liverpool	1892–1916	40	34 to 41 ft (10 to 12 m)	No	
Norfolk and Suffolk	1860–1918	44	30 to 46 ft (9 to 14 m)	No	A sailing lifeboat designed to operate further from shore and around the sandbanks common off East Anglia. It was broader than the self-righting types which made it less likely to capsize.
Palmer	1825–1850	29	25 to 32 ft (8 to 10 m)	No	A small lifeboat based on a whaleboat.
Peake	1851–1916	500+	30 to 43 ft (9 to 13 m)	Yes	A lighter boat developed from the Beeching design in 1851. This was the standard RNLI boat for most of the second half of the nineteenth century and evolved over time. Being so widely used they were often referred to simply as 'self-righters'.
Plenty	1825–1850s		26 ft (8 m)	No	One of the institution's first standard designs.
Richardson	1856–1896	7	32 to 45 ft (10 to 14 m)	No	A tubular design with a slatted floor suspended between two tubes that were joined together at either end. They saw service at Rhyl and New Brighton.
Rubie	1900–1918	17	34 ft (10 m)	Yes	A variation of the self-righting design.
Watson	1892–1915	42	38 to 45 ft (12 to 14 m)	No	
Whale Boat	1869–1910	5	28 to 30 ft (9 to 9 m)	Yes	A small boat built for Ryde and Poolbeg.

=== Early powered lifeboats ===
The RNLI launched its first steam-powered lifeboat in 1889, but by 1905 was experimenting with petrol-engined boats. The first ones were based on pulling and sailing designs and had a single engine but retained sails. Boats with two engines started to appear in 1923 and diesel-engined boats in 1939.

Class	Op. No. prefix	Entered service	Total built	Length	Displacement (tons)	Speed (knots)	Range (nmi)
Barnett	–	1923	37	51 to 60 ft (16 to 18 m)	28 to 40	9.5	300
Clyde	70	1965	3	70 to 71 ft (21 to 22 m)	78 to 85	11.5	1,700
Dover (Note: The Dover lifeboat was a special design to attend aircraft crashes in the English Channel.)	–	1930	1	64 ft (20 m)	27	17.25	94
Harbour (Note: The Harbour lifeboat was a special design for Poolbeg.)	–	1938	1	28 ft (8.5 m)			
Liverpool (Note: Liverpool-class pulling and sailing lifeboats continued to be built until 1916. 28 single-engine Liverpools were built between 1931 and 1941 and 32 with two engines between 1932 and 1954.)	–	1931	60	35 ft 6 in (10.82 m)	6 to 8	7.5	70 to 120
Norfolk and Suffolk (Note: Norfolk and Suffolk-class pulling and sailing lifeboats continued to be built until 1918. The construction of single-engined boats then started but completion was delayed by the First World War.)	–	1921	3	46 ft 6 in (14.17 m)	14 to 17	8	115
Oakley	37	1958	31	37 ft (11 m) (Note: Three Oakley-class lifeboats were 48 ft 6 in (14.78 m) long and given Operational Numbers 48-01 to 48-03. These larger boats displaced 30 tons.)	12	8	140
Ramsgate (Note: The first Ramsgate-class was built with a single engine but the others had two.)	–	1925	3	48 ft (15 m)	21 to 23	8	
Rother	37	1972	11	37 ft 6 in (11.43 m)	13	8	140
Self-righting (Note: The Self-righting motor lifeboats were the final development of the Peake-class introduced in 1851. 43 single engine examples were built between 1908 and 1940, followed by 5 with two engines between 1947 and 1951.)	–	1908	48	35 to 42 ft (11 to 13 m)	5+	8	
Solent	48	1969	11	48 ft 6 in (14.78 m)	27	9.5	240
Steam (hydro jet)	–	1889	3	50 to 55 ft (15 to 17 m)	31		
Steam (screw propeller)	–	1898	3	56 ft (17 m)			
Steam tug	–	1901	1	95 ft 6 in (29.11 m)	133	10	
Surf	–	1936	9	32 ft (9.8 m)	4+	6.5+	40
Thames	50	1973	2	50 ft (15 m)	24+	17.5	210
Watson	–	1909	213	40 to 47 in (1.0 to 1.2 m)	Up to 23	8	280

=== Fast and all-weather lifeboats ===
The advent of lifeboats with a new hull shape in the 1960s allowed them to exceed 10 kn (19 km/h). They eventually became designated as 'all-weather lifeboats' to differentiate them from the inshore lifeboats that were unable to operate in some storm conditions. The first, the Waveney-class, were adapted from an American design.

Class	Op. No. prefix	Entered service	Total built	Length	Displacement (tonnes)	Speed (knots)	Range (nmi)	Crew	Survivor capacity	Launch method
Arun	52 (Note: Some Arun-class lifeboats were 54 feet long so carried Operational Numbers prefixed 54.)	1971	46	16 m (52 ft)	33	18.5	250	6		Afloat
Brede	33	1981	10	10 m (33 ft)	8.6	20	140	4	8	Afloat
Keith Nelson	40	1968	1	12 m (40 ft)						Afloat
Medina	–	1981	3 (Note: The Medina-class lifeboats were Rigid Inflatable Boat prototypes. The Dutch lifeboat service continued their development and put lifeboats of this design into service.)	11 m (35 ft)		28		4		
Mersey	12	1988	38	11.6 m (38 ft)	14	17	140	6	43	Carriage, slipway or afloat
Severn	17	1996	46	17.3 m (57 ft)	42	25	250	7	124	Afloat
Shannon	13	2013	47+ (Note: Shannon-class lifeboats are still being constructed. 47 had been completed by 2023.)	13.6 m (45 ft)	18	25	250	6	79	Carriage, slipway or afloat
Tamar	16	2005	27	16.3 m (53 ft)	32	25	250	7	118	Slipway or afloat
Trent	14	1994	38	14.3 m (47 ft)	28	25	250	6	73	Afloat
Tyne	47	1982	40	14.3 m (47 ft)	24.4	18	240	6	20	Slipway or afloat
Waveney	44	1964	22	13.7 m (44.83 ft)	17	15	205	5		Afloat

=== Inshore lifeboats ===
Lifeboats designed for fast response to incidents close to shore. While there have been many designs since the first inshore rescue boats were introduced in 1963, they are divided into five classes:

- A - rigid-hulled boats
- B - rigid inflatable boats
- C - large inflatable boats
- D - small inflatable boats
- E - special design for the River Thames

Class	Model	Entered service	Total built	Length	Displacement	Speed (knots)	Endurance (hours)	Crew	Survivor capacity	Launch method
A	Boston Whaler	1985	1	6.25 m (20 ft 6 in)		30		2–3		Afloat
A	Hatch	1967	5	6.25 m (20 ft 6 in)		25	5	2–3		Afloat
A	McLachlan	1967	10	6.25 m (20 ft 6 in)		22		2–3		Afloat
C	Zodiac IV	1970	30	5.33 m (17 ft 6 in)		26		4		
B	Atlantic 21	1970	96	6.9 m (23 ft)	1,250 kg (2,750 lb)	30	3	3	22	Carriage
B	Atlantic 75	1993	97	7.3 m (24 ft)	1,500 kg (3,200 lb)	34	3	3	23	Carriage
B	Atlantic 85	2005	140+ (Note: B-class Atlantic 85s are still being constructed. 140 had been completed by 2023.)	8.4 m (28 ft)	1,800 kg (4,000 lb)	35	3	3-4	20	Carriage, davit or floating boathouse
D	Avon S650	1971	4	4.9 m (16 ft)		20	3		10	
D	Dunlop	1965	11					2-3		
D	EA16	1987	257	4.9 m (16 ft)	338 kg (745 lb)	20	3	3–4		Carriage or davit
D	Humber	1981	2					2-3		
D	IB1	2001	284+ (Note: D-class IB1s are still being constructed. 284 had been completed by 2023.)	5 m (16 ft)	400 kg (880 lb)	25	3	2-3	5	Carriage or davit
D	RFD 320	1966	6					2-3		Used as Boarding Boats
D	RFD PB16	1963	228	4.9 m (16 ft)				2–3		Carriage or davit
D	Zodiac III	1971	64					2–3		Carriage or davit
E	Mark 1	2002	6	10.5 m (34 ft)	5,900 kg (13,000 lb)	40	3	4	20	Afloat
E	Mark 2	2012	3	10.5 m (34 ft)	5,900 kg (13,000 lb)	40	3	4	20	Afloat
E	Mark 3	2019	1	11.05 m (36.3 ft)	7,780 kg (17,150 lb)	45	3	4	20	Afloat

=== Other rescue craft ===
Class	Type	Entered service	Total built	Length	Weight / Displacement	Speed (knots)	Endurance (hours)	Crew	Notes
Arancia	Inflatable rescue boat	2001	78+	3.8 m (12 ft)	165 kg	8		2	25 used by on lifeguard units, 3 deployed at lifeboat stations.
BB	Boarding boat								(Note: The Boarding Boats are a variety of different types mostly used where lifeboats are moored afloat. Modern examples are inflatable boats but retired inshore lifeboats may also be used.)
H	Hovercraft	2002	7	8 m (26 ft)	3.86 tonnes	30	3	2-4	
RWC	Rescue water craft	2001						1	Fast craft used by lifeguard units.
X	Inflatable rescue boat								Unmotored boat normally carried on board Tyne-class lifeboats but is an option on the Mersey and Shannon.
XP	Inflatable rescue boat			2.81 m (9.2 ft)	61 kg	10 or 25	2	2	A small powered boat which is normally carried on board the Trent-class lifeboats.
Y	Inflatable rescue boat			3 m (9.8 ft)		25		2	Small powered boat normally found on board Severn and Tamar-class lifeboats.

== Historic Lifeboat Owners Association ==
The Historic Lifeboat Owners Association has been set up for individuals who own, maintain, crew or have a general interest in historic lifeboats. The association is a community whereby people can share knowledge, experience, information and advise on the subject, organizes social events and historic lifeboat rallies.

At the beginning of each summer an ex-lifeboat rally is held at Fowey in Cornwall whereby owners bring their boats and display them to the public; this event is organized by Fowey RNLI and is an opportunity to raise funds for the RNLI. Rallies have also been held in Falmouth, Belfast, Glasgow, Poole and Yarmouth, Isle of Wight.

== See also ==
- List of RNLB lifeboats
- List of RNLI stations – List of RNLI stations in Great Britain and Ireland
- Lifeboat (rescue) – Rescue craft used to attend a vessel in distress or survivors
- Search and rescue – Search for and provision of aid to people who are in distress or imminent danger
- Air-sea rescue – Coordinated search and rescue of survivors at sea
- Inflatable rescue boat – Type of rescue boat
- List of lifeboat disasters in the British Isles
- James Stevens lifeboats – British lifeboats
- Little Ships of Dunkirk – Boats in the 1940 Dunkirk evacuation
