= D-class lifeboat (RFD 320) =

Class overview
- Name: D-class (RFD 320)
- Builders: RFD
- Operators: Royal National Lifeboat Institution
- Preceded by: D-class (RFD PB16)
- Succeeded by: D-class (RFD PB16)
- Built: 1966–1967
- In service: 1966–1983
- Completed: 6
- Retired: 6

General characteristics
- Class & type: RFD 320
- Complement: 2 or 3

The D-class (RFD 320) lifeboat is a class of inflatable boat operated between 1967 and 1983 by the Royal National Lifeboat Institution of the United Kingdom and Ireland.

They were manufactured by R.F.D. Co.Ltd of Gadalming, Surrey, a company founded by engineer Reginald Foster Dagnall. Over time, RFD became a synonym for "Rapid Flotation Devices".

== Utilization ==
For more than 60 years the D-class has served as the workhorse of the RNLI Inshore Lifeboat (ILB) fleet. The D-class is one of the few RNLI types not to feature a rigid hull. The D-class was specifically designed as a light and highly manoeuvrable rapid response craft, especially suited to close shore work.

There were only six D-class (RFD 320) boats in the RNLI Fleet, and all were utilised as Boarding Boats.

== RNLI Fleet ==
Op. No. (Note: Op. No. is the RNLI's Operational Number of the boat.)	Name	In service	Station	Comments
D-77	Unnamed	1967–1980	Boarding Boat (Y1)	
D-78	Unnamed	1967–1976	Boarding Boat (Y2)	
D-79	Unnamed	1967–1981	Boarding Boat (Y3)	
D-80	Unnamed	1967–1983	Boarding Boat (Y4)	
D-118	Unnamed	1966–1980	Boarding Boat (Y6)	
D-119	Unnamed	1966–1976	Boarding Boat (Y7)	
