= D-class lifeboat (Humber) =

Class overview
- Name: D-class (Humber)
- Operators: Royal National Lifeboat Institution
- Built: 1981–1982
- In service: 1981–1994
- Completed: 2
- Retired: 2

General characteristics
- Class & type: Humber
- Complement: 2 or 3

The D-class (Humber) lifeboat is a class of inflatable boat operated between 1981 and 1994 by the Royal National Lifeboat Institution of the United Kingdom and Ireland.

Only 2 were built, one for the Relief fleet, and one used as a Boarding Boat.

== Utilization ==
For more than 60 years the D-class has served as the workhorse of the RNLI Inshore Lifeboat (ILB) fleet. The D-class is one of the few RNLI types not to feature a rigid hull. The D-class was specifically designed as a light and highly manoeuvrable rapid response craft, especially suited to close shore work.

== RNLI Fleet ==
Op. No. (Note: Op. No. is the RNLI's Operational Number of the boat.)	Name	In service	Station	Comments
D-284	Unnamed	1981–1988	Relief fleet	
D-285	Unnamed	1982–1994	Boarding Boat	
