= Hatch-class lifeboat =

Inshore lifeboat class of the RNLI

Class overview
- Name: Hatch class
- Builders: William Osborne Ltd of Littlehampton.
- Operators: Royal National Lifeboat Institution
- Succeeded by: McLachlan-class, Atlantic 21
- Built: 1966
- In service: 1967–1975
- Completed: 2
- Retired: 2

General characteristics
- Length: 20 ft 6 in (6.25 m)
- Beam: 7 ft 2 in (2.18 m)
- Draught: 3 ft 1.5 in (0.953 m)
- Propulsion: 18-01:Volvo-Penta Aquamatic AQD110 inboard petrol engine, type 100 outboard drive; 18-03: Diesel engine
- Speed: 25.75 knots (29.63 mph; 47.69 km/h)
- Endurance: 5 hours
- Complement: 2

The Hatch-class lifeboat was one of a group of rigid-hull Inshore lifeboats, developed after the success of the smaller D-class Inshore lifeboats, operated by the Royal National Lifeboat Institution (RNLI) of the United Kingdom and Ireland. The lifeboats, re-designated as A-class lifeboats in 1972, operated from 1967 to 1975.

== History ==
In 1962, the number of rescues or attempted rescues by All-weather lifeboats in the summer months was 98, with the number of lives rescued being 133. In 1963, in response to an increasing amount of water-based leisure activity, the RNLI began trials of small fast D-class (RFD PB16) Inshore lifeboats, placed at various locations around the country. These were easily launched with just a few people, ideal to respond quickly to local emergencies, and quickly proved to be very successful. In 1963, there were 226 rescues or attempted rescues in the summer months, as a result of which 225 lives were saved.

It was quickly seen that a larger class of Inshore boat would bridge the gap between the smaller D-class, and the standard All-weather lifeboats. These boats would have a rigid hull, capable of being moored afloat, and offering the option of being a boarding boat, but still be fast, and easy to launch.

The Hatch-class lifeboat was designed by George N. Hatch, AMRINA, a senior draughtsman with the Institution, and a prototype was constructed in wood by William Osborne at Littlehampton. Prior to being trialled at Falmouth and Shoreham Harbour, the boat was displayed on the Osborne stand at the Earls Court International Boat Show from 4–14 January, 1967.

Only two Hatch-class lifeboats were constructed. The McLachlan-class Inshore lifeboat, trialled at the same time, was deemed to be a superior boat.

== Design ==
Design requirements were as follows:

- Shallow draught
- Speed to be well in excess of 20 knots (37 km/h; 23 mph)
- Unsinkable with eight people on board
- Of 18–20 ft (5.5–6.1 m) in length
- Capable of high speed in rough water (up to force 8)

The design of the hull was similar to that of a modern off-shore power-boat, capable of up to 26 knots (48 km/h; 30 mph) in calm water. Two padded sprung seats were provided for the crew. The first boat was fitted with a Volvo-Penta Aquamatic AQD110 inboard petrol engine, coupled to a Type 100 outboard drive, which was covered by a tubular galvanised steel propeller guard, giving an overall length of 20 ft 6 in (6.25 m).

== Notable service ==
On 5 October 1973, on service at Torbay, A-2 was launched at 15:50, crewed by the ALB Coxswain and Mechanic, following reports of a woman in the surf at Meadfoot Beach near Torquay. Spotting the woman, the mechanic jumped from the lifeboat into the sea to grab the woman, but found himself tossed around by the surf, and was fortunate to be pulled from the water by a local policeman. Tied to a line, he set out again, managing to retrieve the body of the woman, who had died from a head injury. For his gallantry, Barry John Pike was awarded the RNLI Silver Medal and The Ralph Glister Award for the most meritorious service of the year performed by a rescue boat crew member. Coxswain Kenneth Gibbs, (Helm), was accorded 'The Thanks of the Institution inscribed on Vellum'.

== Classification ==
In 1972, it was decided to reclassify the 17 and 18-foot rigid-hull boats, from Offshore to Inshore A-class lifeboats, and their operational numbers were changed accordingly; 18-01 becoming A-1, and 18-03 becoming A-2.

All of the following fleet details are referenced to the 2026 Lifeboat Enthusiasts' Society Handbook, with information retrieved directly from RNLI records.

== Fleet ==
Old Op.No. (Note: Op.No. is the RNLI's Operational Number of the boat carried on the hull.)	Op.No.	Built	In service	Station	Comments
18-01	A-1	1966	1967	Falmouth	Sold in August 1972
18-01	A-1	1966	1967	Shoreham Harbour	Sold in August 1972
18-01	A-1	1966	1968–1972	Plymouth	Sold in August 1972
18-03	A-2	1966	1967–1969	Poole	Scrapped in 1975
18-03	A-2	1966	1969–1975	Torbay	Scrapped in 1975

== See also ==
- List of RNLI stations
- List of former RNLI stations
- Royal National Lifeboat Institution lifeboats
