= Kessingland Lifeboat Station =

Former RNLI lifeboat station in Suffolk, England

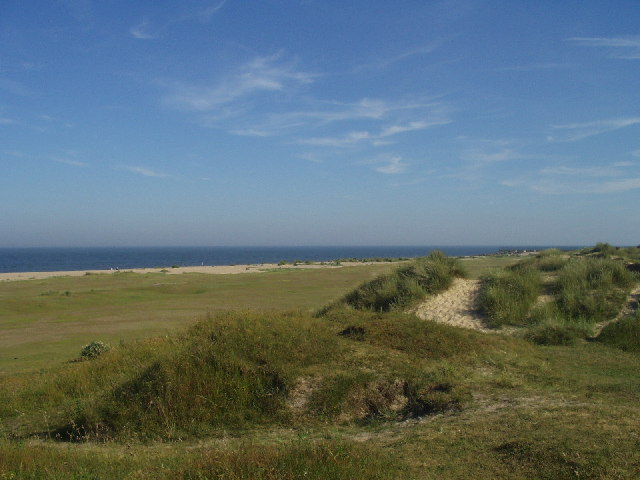
- Kessingland Beach.

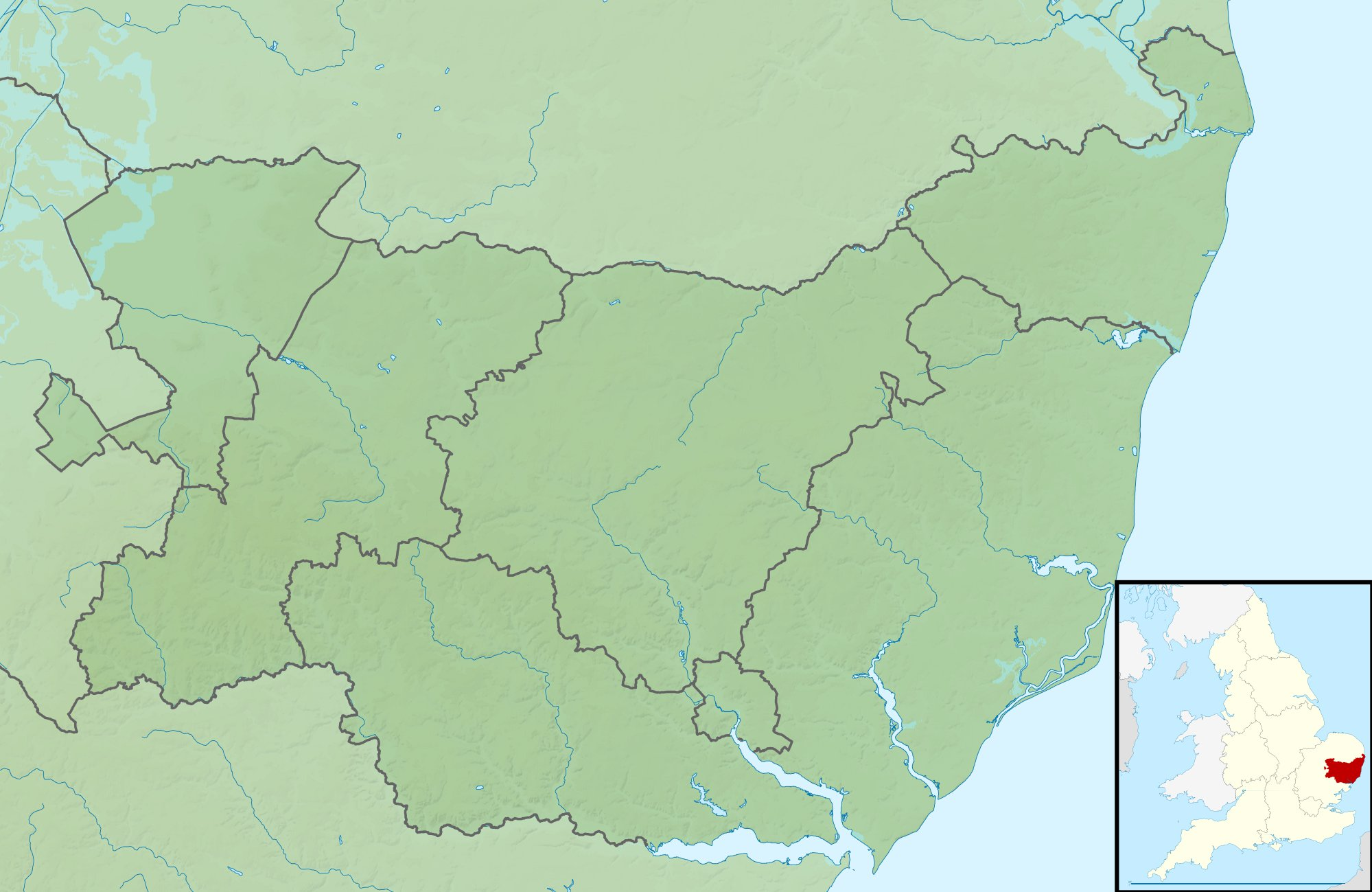
- Kessingland, Suffolk

General information
- Status: Closed
- Type: RNLI Lifeboat Station
- Location: Church Road, Kessingland, Suffolk, England
- Coordinates: 52°24′40.4″N 1°43′39.6″E
- Opened: 1855; 1867 RNLI
- Closed: 1936

Kessingland Lifeboat Station was primarily located at the north end of Church Lane in Kessingland, a village approx 6 miles (9.7 km) south of Lowestoft, on the Suffolk coast.

A lifeboat was first placed at Kessingland by the local boatmen in 1855. Operations by the Royal National Lifeboat Institution (RNLI) began in 1867.

After 81 years of operation, Kessingland Lifeboat Station closed in 1936.

== History ==
Ever since its founding in 1824, the Royal National Institution for the Preservation of Life from Shipwreck (RNIPLS), later to become the RNLI in 1854, would award medals for deeds of gallantry at sea, even if no lifeboats were involved.

On 19 December 1835, no fewer than 13 vessels were driven ashore on the Suffolk coast. Coastguard Jones and his party of men waded through the surf, and rescued the Master and five crew from the brig Royalist, six men from the schooner Stansfield, and three men from other vessels. Lt. Richard Jones, RN, was awarded the RNLI Silver Medal.

In 1855, a lifeboat was acquired for Kessingland by the local boatmen. A new boat, likely costing maybe £200, was out of reach, the boatmen having raised locally the sum of £73. A second-hand 40-foot x 11-foot lifeboat, Solebay, was purchased from Southwold. Assistance from the RNLI was requested, answered with a grant of £10, and a set of life-belts, worth £14.

Following a visit and report by Capt. D. Robertson, RN, assistant Inspector of Lifeboats, at a meeting of the RNLI committee of management on Thursday 6 June 1867, it was decided to establish a station at Kessingland. A new boathouse, costing £164, was constructed at Benacre, just to the south of Kessingland, near Beach Farm. With a self-righting lifeboat not suiting the requirements of the local boatmen, a 33-foot Norfolk and Suffolk-class 'Pulling and Sailing' (P&S) lifeboat, one with sails and (12) oars, was placed at the station. Funded from the generous donation of £500 from Mr John Hargreaves of Broad Oak, Accrington, Lancashire, at his request, the lifeboat was named Grace and Lally of Broadoak (ON 26).

By 1869, the second-hand lifeboat acquired in 1855 by the Kessingland boatmen had become unseaworthy, and was condemned. The RNLI decided to place another lifeboat at Kessingland, and a second boathouse was constructed nearer the village, at the north end of what is now Church Street, at a cost of £266.

A large 42-foot Norfolk and Suffolk-class lifeboat, built by Beeching of Great Yarmouth, and costing £270-5s, was sent to Kessingland. The new station would now be known as Kessingland No.1, with the earlier station at Benacre becoming Kessingland No.2. The new lifeboat was funded by the people of Bolton le Moors. Several of the Bolton branch organising committee attended the inauguration and naming ceremony on 17 November 1870, when the boat was named Bolton (ON 25).

In 1883, Coxswain George Strowger was awarded the RNLI Silver Medal, in recognition of his long service since the establishment of the station, including service to the following vessels:

- Schooner Centaur of Exeter, (26–27 October 1865), saved five of the seven crew.
- Schooner Admiral Jervis of Gravesend, (10 December 1868), saved the crew of five.
- Brigantine Flora (1870)
- Schooner Jessie (1874)
- Brig Sir William Pulteney (6 October 1874), rescued the crew of 15.
- Brig Lady Havelock (30 November 1877), rescued the crew of eight.
- Barque Cleopas of South Shields (13 January 1879), rescued the crew of 10.
- Brig Maria of Hartlepool (14 October 1881), rescued the crew of six.
- Brig Marnhull of Weymouth (10 February 1883), rescued five of the six crew.

Following requests by the lifeboat crew for a larger lifeboat (than the existing No.2 station boat) for use around the sand-banks, a 38-foot lifeboat was sent to the station, establishing Kessingland No.3 station. The lifeboat was built by James Beeching of Great Yarmouth, and cost £363, with boathouse work costing an additional £337. The lifeboat was sailed to its station from Great Yarmouth by its crew, arriving on 24 March 1884. The lifeboat was named Charles Bury (ON 27), the cost of the lifeboat defrayed from the legacy of the said Charles Bury of Nazeing, Essex. The lifeboat operated until 1897, and was then withdrawn.

Coxswain George Strowger would receive a second RNLI Silver Medal (Second-service clasp) in 1895 for his continued service, including to the following vessels:

- Steamship Empress (1890)
- Schooner Kate and Elizabeth of Portsmouth (18 May 1891), Rescued the Master, his daughter, and four crew.
- Brigantine Alberta of Whitstable (23 February 1894), rescued the crew of eight.

Kessingland Lifeboat Station continued to operate a No. 3 lifeboat until 1897, and the No. 2 lifeboat until 1918.

Honorary Secretary Mr. Ernest Woolfield was accorded a "Letter of Thanks signed by the Secretary of the Institution", after volunteering to make up the full crew, when the lifeboat launched in gale-force conditions to the aid of the fishing boat Maria of Southwold on 10 June 1921.

In 1926, Kessingland lifeboat man Harry Smith was at work on the trawler Sarepta of Lowestoft. A crew member was thrown overboard, when the boat rolled suddenly. With no consideration of his own safety, Smith jumped overboard, and saved the man's life. He was initially awarded the Silver Medal of the Royal Humane Society, but later received the Stanhope Gold Medal, for the most gallant rescue of the previous twelve months.

With motor-powered lifeboats at the flanking stations of Lowestoft and Aldeburgh, and reduced numbers of sailing vessels falling victim to the weather, Kessingland Lifeboat Station closed in 1936.

A building still stands on the Kessingland site, although it is unclear if anything remains of the original station. The station site at Benacre has long been lost to the sea. The lifeboat on station at the time of closure, 34-foot Norfolk and Suffolk (P&S) lifeboat Hugh Taylor (ON 629), was sold from service the same year, and was last reported as a yacht in Dordrecht in 1987.

== Wigg family ==
It is not uncommon for many generations of the same family to be involved with the town's lifeboat, and in the case of Kessingland, it was the Wigg family. On 19 December 1925, a special Vellum certificate in the form of a family tree, was presented to Edward Wigg Sr., in recognition of the exceptional service he and his family have rendered to the Institution. Whig Sr. became a crew member in 1870, his four sons included a Coxswain, Signalman, and two holders of the RNLI Bronze Medal. Three grandsons and one great-grandson joined the crew, with one daughter and great-daughter active within the Ladies Guild. The Vellum presented was in the form of a family tree, but with the dates of lifeboat service.

== Notable rescues ==
On the 11 December 1919, in gale-force conditions, the Smack A. J. W. of Rye, East Sussex ran aground on Newcombe Sands off Lowestoft. The Kessingland lifeboat St Paul (ON 406) was launched, nearly being driven back ashore but for the quick raising of the sails. The cries of the survivors help locate the sunken smack, and four men were seen clinging to the two visible masts. Setting anchor and veering down, one man was recovered, but the three remaining men were in a more difficult position. At great risk to the lifeboat and crew, the Coxswain veered the lifeboat over the rails of the boat, between the two masts, and the remaining three crew were rescued.

For this service, Coxswain George Knights and Second Coxswain Edward Smith were each awarded the RNLI Silver Medal. Each of the 14 remaining lifeboat crew were awarded the RNLI Bronze Medal.

== Station honours ==
The following are awards made at Kessingland.

- Stanhope Gold Medal of the Royal Humane Society
  awarded for the most gallant rescue of the previous twelve months.

Harry Smith – 1926

- RNLI Silver Medal

Lt. Richard Jones, RN, HM Coastguard, Kessingland – 1836

George Strowger, Coxswain – 1883

George Strowger, Coxswain – 1895 (Second-Service clasp)

George Henry Knights, Coxswain – 1920
Edward John Smith, Second Coxswain – 1920

- Silver Medal of the Royal Humane Society

Harry Smith – 1926

- RNLI Bronze Medal

Christopher Crispin Smith, Bowman – 1920
Ernest William Bagot, crew member – 1920
George Blowers, crew member – 1920
Sidney James Brown, crew member – 1920
Richard Catchpole, crew member – 1920
William Hart, crew member – 1920
John B. Jeffery, crew member – 1920
Louis Henry Kemp, crew member – 1920
J. C. Mudditt, crew member – 1920
Herbert Thacker, crew member – 1920
Alfred Utting, crew member – 1920
Arthur Utting, crew member – 1920
Alfred Wigg, crew member – 1920
Wilfred Wigg, crew member – 1920

- Letter of Thanks signed by the Secretary of the Institution

Ernest Woolfield, Honorary Secretary – 1921

- The Thanks of the Institution inscribed on Vellum

Ernest Woolfield, Honorary Secretary – 1930

== Roll of honour ==
In memory of those lost whilst serving Kessingland lifeboat.

- Lost when the lifeboat capsized during launch to a vessel from Great Yarmouth, 15 July 1875

Thomas Tripp (31)

=== Kessingland / Kessingland No. 1 ===
ON (Note: ON is the RNLI's Official Number of the boat.)	Name	Built	On station	Class	Comments
–	Solebay	1841	1855−1869	40-foot Norfolk and Suffolk (P&S)	(Note: 40-foot x 11-foot (12-oared) Norfolk and Suffolk-class non-self-righting (P&S) lifeboat, built by Wm. Teasdel of Great Yarmouth, costing £320 when new.); Previously at Southwold.
25	Bolton	1870	1870−1893	42-foot 5in Norfolk and Suffolk (P&S)	(Note: 42-foot 5in x 12-foot (12/14-oared) Norfolk & Suffolk-class non-self-righting (P&S) lifeboat, gift of the Bolton LB fund, built by James Beeching of Great Yarmouth, costing £270.); Capsized 15 July 1875.
352	Bolton	1893	1893−1902	43-foot Norfolk and Suffolk (P&S)	(Note: 43-foot x 12-foot 9in (12/14-oared) Norfolk & Suffolk-class non-self-righting (P&S) lifeboat, gift of the Bolton LB fund, built by Chambers and Colby of Lowestoft, costing £639.); Loaned to Aldeburgh in 1902.
Station temporarily closed 1902
352	Bolton	1893	1902–1918	43-foot Norfolk and Suffolk (P&S)	
406	St Paul	1897	1918−1931	38-foot Norfolk and Suffolk (P&S)	Previously Kessingland No.2
629	Hugh Taylor	1912	1931−1936	34-foot Norfolk and Suffolk (P&S)	(Note: 34-foot x 10-foot (12-oared) Norfolk & Suffolk-class non-self-righting (P&S) lifeboat, gift of Mrs E. Stratford of London, built by Thames Ironworks of Blackwall, London, costing £1,250 when new); Previously at Gt. Yarmouth, Pakefield and Aldeburgh.

Station Closed, 1936

=== Kessingland / Kessingland No. 2 (Benacre) ===
52°24′40.4″N 1°43′39.6″E

ON	Name	Built	On station	Class	Comments
26	Grace and Lally of Broadoak	1867	1867−1879	32-foot Norfolk and Suffolk (P&S) 'Surf-Boat'	(Note: 32-foot x 10-foot (12-oared) Norfolk & Suffolk-class non-self-righting (P&S) 'Surf-Boat', gift of Mr J. Hargreaves of Broad Oak, Accrington, built by James Beeching of Great Yarmouth, costing £156.); Renamed St Michaels, Paddington in 1879.
26	St Michaels, Paddington	1867	1879–1897	32-foot Norfolk and Suffolk (P&S) 'Surf-Boat'	(Note: Gift of St Michael's LB fund.)
406	St Paul	1897	1897−1918	38-foot Norfolk and Suffolk (P&S)	(Note: 38-foot x 12-foot (12-oared) Norfolk & Suffolk-class non-self-righting (P&S) lifeboat, gift of Mr Jas. Paul of Barnes, built by James Beeching of Great Yarmouth, costing £530.)

Station Closed, 1918

=== Kessingland No. 3 ===
ON	Name	Built	On station	Class	Comments
27	Charles Bury	1884	1884−1897	38-foot 6in Norfolk and Suffolk (P&S)	(Note: 38-foot 6in x 12-foot 5in (12-oared) Norfolk & Suffolk-class non-self-righting (P&S) lifeboat, legacy of Charles Bury of Nazeing, built by James Beeching of Great Yarmouth, costing £363.)

Station Closed, 1897

== See also ==
- List of RNLI stations
- List of former RNLI stations
- Royal National Lifeboat Institution lifeboats
