= Winterton Lifeboat Station =

Former RNLI lifeboat station in Norfolk, England

- Location within Norfolk

General information
- Status: Closed
- Type: RNLI Lifeboat Station
- Location: Winterton-on-Sea, Norfolk, England
- Coordinates: 52°43′01.0″N 1°41′53.0″E
- Opened: No.1 1823 NASLSM; No. 1 1857 RNLI; No. 2 1868 Boatmen; No. 2 1879 RNLI
- Closed: No. 1 1924; No. 2 1925

Winterton Lifeboat Station was located in Winterton-on-Sea, a village approximately 9 miles (14 km) due north of Great Yarmouth, on the north-east coast of Norfolk.

A lifeboat was first stationed at Winterton-on-Sea by the Norfolk Association for Saving the Lives of Shipwrecked Mariners (NASLSM), sometimes known as the Norfolk Shipwreck Association or (NSA), in 1823. Management of the station was transferred to the Royal National Lifeboat Institution (RNLI) in 1857.

After operating for 101 years, Winterton Lifeboat Station closed in 1925.

== History ==
A lifeboat was sent to be stationed at Winterton in 1823, by the newly formed Norfolk Association for Saving the Lives of Shipwrecked Mariners. Built in 1822, she was a 32-foot 12-oared non-self-righting lifeboat. Launched to the aid of the vessel Mariners in 1829, the lifeboat was badly damaged, and the lifeboat crew had to take refuge aboard the casualty boat, until all could be rescued by other local boats.

Following a meeting of the NASLSM on 21 Nov 1857, it was agreed to request that the RNLI take over responsibility for all their lifeboat stations, including Winterton. This was formally agreed at a meeting of the RNLI committee of management on 3 December 1857.

A new 30-foot 10-oared self-righting lifeboat was ordered for Winterton from Forrestt of Limehouse, London, costing £185-3s-5d, arriving in 1858. The new boat was sailed up from Great Yarmouth, having been towed there from London by steamer. This unnamed boat would only serve at Winterton for two years. She was disliked by the crew, and was subsequently transferred to Rye Harbour.

The Winterton lifeboat crew requested a wide beam boat, a Norfolk and Suffolk-class lifeboat, as used at Gt. Yarmouth, and similar to their own fishing boats. An order was placed with Beeching for a 32-foot lifeboat, and was delivered on 5 January 1861. However, the lifeboat crew were still not entirely happy with this new boat, as it still wasn't long enough for all their requirements. Their further request for another replacement lifeboat was declined by the RNLI.

At the annual meeting of the Institution in February 1867, a gift of £420 was handed to Mr Lewis, Honorary Secretary of Winterton Lifeboat, by Capt. Harris of Roehampton, who wished the lifeboat to be named the Ann Maria. The Ann Maria would be renamed again in 1875, Edward Birkbeck, after the RNLI Vice President.

In 1868, and still not happy with the Ann Maria, the crew, known as the Winterton Boatmen, acquired their own 42-foot Norfolk and Suffolk-class lifeboat Rescuer, from the Gorleston Rangers lifeboat company, purchased by William Burnley Hume of Hill House, Winterton, and was operated for the next 11 years.

At a meeting with the RNLI in 1879, the Winterton crew explained that for certain calls, they preferred a longer boat than the Ann Maria (Edward Birkbeck), but also that they could no longer afford to maintain Rescuer. The RNLI then took over management of the No.2 lifeboat, but although they provided a replacement Norfolk and Suffolk-class lifeboat, Husband (ON 16), transferred from the recently closed station at Corton, it was still only 36-feet long. Two years later, a double boathouse was constructed, to house both lifeboats.

It would be 11 years later, in 1890, when the RNLI provided Margaret (ON 270), a 44-foot lifeboat, to the station.

In 1896, the station received a new No.1 lifeboat, also to be named Edward Birkbeck (ON 397). The No.2 lifeboat Margaret (ON 270) was sent for an overhaul, with Reserve No.1 (ON 233) on relief duty. Reserve No.1 seemed to find favour with the Winterton crew, who requested that it become their permanent No.2 lifeboat. In 1899, Margaret (ON 270) was transferred to Aldeburgh becoming Reserve Lifeboat No.1 (ON 270), and Reserve No.1 (ON 233) becoming Margaret (ON 233).

The activity at Winterton Lifeboat Station came to rather an abrupt end. In October 1924, the No.1 lifeboat station was closed when the Edward Birkbeck (ON 397), was withdrawn. A month later, the No.2 lifeboat, Eleanor Brown (ON 589), was also withdrawn, and a replacement No.2 lifeboat, a 38-foot Liverpool-class (P&S) lifeboat Reserve No.9 (ON 516) was placed at the station. Unfamiliar with this type of lifeboat, and being considered completely unsuitable for the locality, the crew absolutely refused to use the boat. On 18 December 1924, after just over 100 years of service, the RNLI decided to close the station completely, with the removal of the lifeboat completing the closure on 5 January 1925.

== Notable service ==
On 26 November 1830, Lt. Thomas Leigh, RN, Chief Officer of H.M. Coastguard Winterton, was in charge of the lifeboat, rescuing seven people from the Annabella. Only a month later, Lt. Leigh and his crew rescued another four from the Henry. On 19 March 1833, Leigh and his crew went to the aid of the Crawford Davison, rescuing 16 passengers and crew, and on 30 April 1835, in a severe gale, Leigh and the crew rescued three survivors from the Blackbird.

In a five-year period, Lt. Thomas Leigh, RN, was awarded the RNIPLS Gold Medal, a Second-Service RNIPLS Gold Boat, the RNIPLS Silver Medal, and the Silver Medal of the Royal Humane Society.

== Station honours ==
The following are awards made at Winterton:

- RNIPLS Gold Medal
  Lt. Thomas Leigh, RN, Coastguard – 1831
  Lt. Thomas Leigh, RN, Coastguard – 1833 (Second-Service Gold Boat)
- RNIPLS Silver Medal
  Lt. Thomas Leigh, RN, Coastguard – 1835
  Lt. George Graham, RN, Coastguard – 1836
- RNLI Silver Medal
  William Hodds, Coxswain – 1893
  William Hodds, Coxswain – 1893 (Second-service clasp)
- Silver Medal, awarded by the Royal Humane Society
  Lt. Thomas Leigh, RN, Coastguard – 1833

== Winterton lifeboats ==
=== No.1 Station ===
ON (Note: ON is the RNLI's Official Number of the boat.)	Name	Built	On station	Class	Comments
Pre-084	Unnamed	1822	1823−1858	32-foot North-Country	(Note: 32-foot x 10-foot 6in (12-oared) North-Country non-self-righting lifeboat.); NASLSM lifeboat.
Pre-323	Unnamed	1858	1858−1860	30-foot Self-righting (P&S)	(Note: 30-foot x 7-foot 6in (10-oared) Peake-class self-righting (P&S) lifeboat, from RNLI funds, built by Forrestt of Limehouse, London, costing £185.)
15	Unnamed	1860	1861−1867	32-foot Norfolk and Suffolk 'Surf-boat'	(Note: 32-foot (12-oared) Norfolk and Suffolk-class (P&S), from RNLI funds, built by James Beeching of Great Yarmouth, costing £120.); Renamed Ann Maria in 1867.
15	Ann Maria	1860	1867−1875	32-foot Norfolk and Suffolk 'Surf-boat'	(Note: Gift of Capt. W. Harris.); Renamed Edward Birkbeck in 1875.
15	Edward Birkbeck	1860	1875−1896	32-foot Norfolk and Suffolk 'Surf-boat'	(Note: RNLI funds.)
397	Edward Birkbeck	1896	1896−1924	34-foot Norfolk and Suffolk 'Surf-boat'	(Note: 34-foot x 10-foot (12-oared) Norfolk and Suffolk-class non-self-righting (P&S) 'surf-boat', from RNLI funds, built by James Beeching of Great Yarmouth, costing £436.)

Station Closed, 1924
Pre ON numbers are unofficial numbers used by the Lifeboat Enthusiast Society to reference early lifeboats not included on the official RNLI list.

=== No.2 Station ===
ON	Name	Built	On station	Class	Comments
–	Rescuer	1853	1868−1879	42-foot Norfolk and Suffolk (P&S)	(Note: 42-foot x 12-foot Norfolk and Suffolk-class non-self-righting (P&S) lifeboat, funded by B. Hume of Winterton, built by James Beeching of Great Yarmouth.); Private lifeboat, owned and operated by the Winterton Boatmen.
16	Husband	1869	1879−1890	36-foot Norfolk and Suffolk (P&S)	(Note: 36-foot x 10-foot 6in (14-oared) Norfolk and Suffolk-class non-self-righting (P&S) lifeboat, gift of Mrs Geo. Davis of Clapham, built by James Beeching of Great Yarmouth, costing £180.); Previously at Corton.
270	Margaret	1889	1890−1899	44-foot Norfolk and Suffolk (P&S)	(Note: 44-foot x 14-foot 2in (12-oared) Norfolk and Suffolk-class non-self-righting (P&S) lifeboat, legacy of Miss Mary Eason of London, built by James Beeching of Great Yarmouth, costing £368.)
233	Margaret	1889	1899−1907	44-foot Norfolk and Suffolk (P&S)	(Note: 44-foot x 12-foot 3in Norfolk and Suffolk-class non-self-righting (P&S) lifeboat, gift of the London Corn Exchange and Baltic LB fund, built by James Beeching of Great Yarmouth, costing £315.); Reserve Lifeboat No.1, previously Mark Lane at Gorleston No. 1.
270	Reserve No.1	1889	1907−1909	44-foot Norfolk and Suffolk (P&S)	Previously Margaret (ON 270) at Winterton No.2
589	Eleanor Brown	1909	1909−1924	44-foot 6in Norfolk and Suffolk (P&S)	(Note: 44-foot 6in x 12-foot 6in (12-oared) Norfolk and Suffolk-class non-self-righting (P&S) lifeboat, legacy of Mrs E. Brown of Wandsworth, built by Thames Ironworks of Blackwall, London, costing £2,015.)
516	Charles Deere James	1903	1924−1925	38-foot Liverpool (P&S)	(Note: 38-foot x 10-foot Liverpool-class non-self-righting (P&S) lifeboat, gift of Mrs S. C. Guthrie of Tunbridge Wells, built by Thames Ironworks of Blackwall, London, costing £1,054 when new.); Reserve lifeboat No.9, previously at St Agnes, IOS and Humber.

Station Closed, 1925

== See also ==
- List of RNLI stations
- List of former RNLI stations
- Royal National Lifeboat Institution lifeboats
