= Norfolk and Suffolk-class lifeboat =

Former RNLI lifeboat class

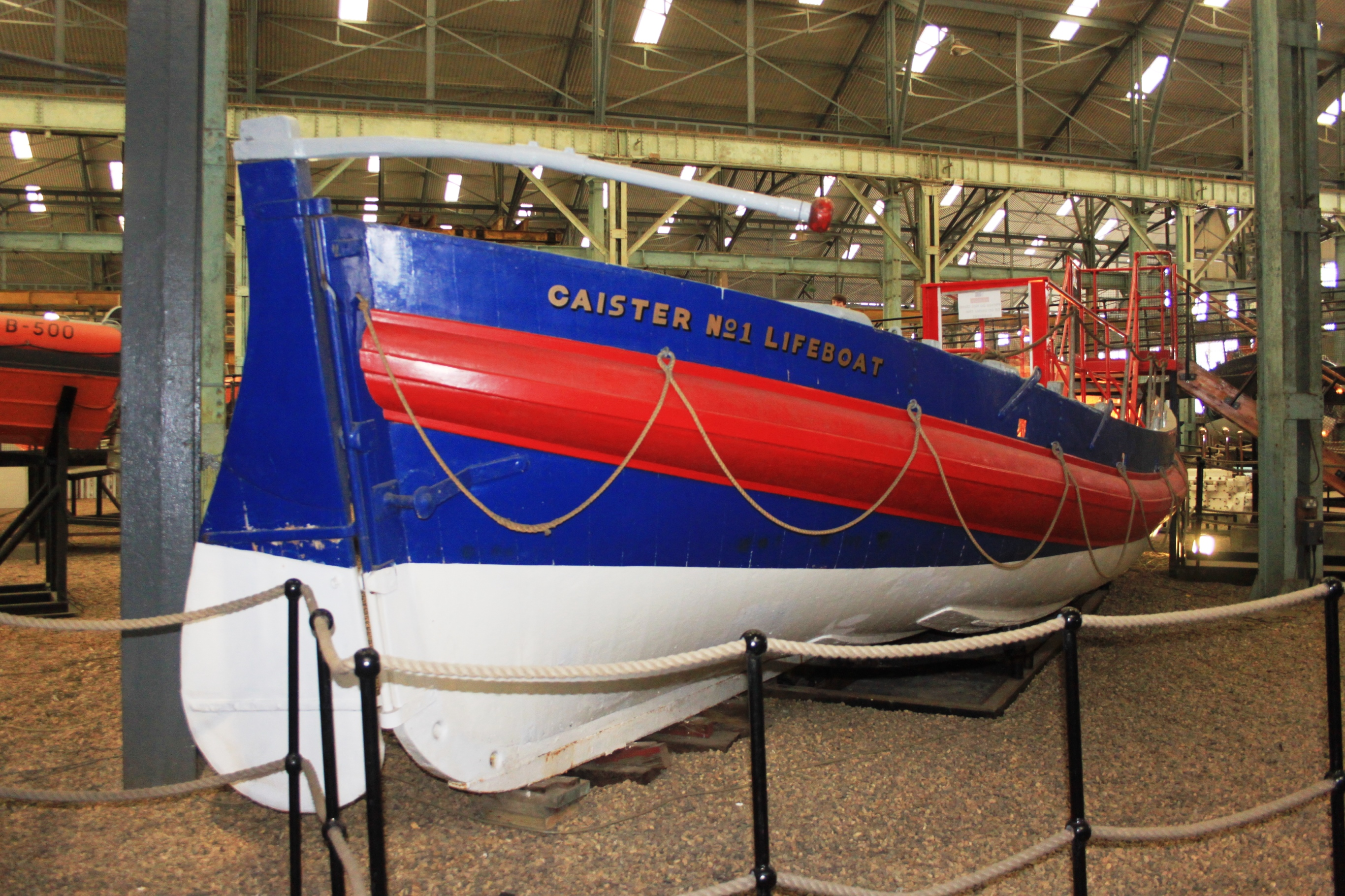
- RNLB James Leith (ON 607), an early 20th century lifeboat in the RNLI Heritage Collection at Chatham Historic Dockyard

Class overview
- Name: Norfolk and Suffolk-class
- Builders: Various
- Operators: RNLI and others
- Built: 1807–1925
- In service: 1807–1953

General characteristics - sailing lifeboats
- Length: 30 to 46 ft (9.1 to 14.0 m)
- Beam: 10 to 12 ft (3.0 to 3.7 m)
- Crew: 16–22

General characteristics - motor lifeboats
- Displacement: 14-17 tons
- Length: 46 ft 6 in (14.17 m)
- Beam: 12 ft 9 in (3.89 m)
- Installed power: 40 bhp to 80 bhp
- Propulsion: Single screw
- Speed: 8 kn (9.2 mph; 15 km/h)
- Range: ~115 nmi (132 mi; 213 km)
- Crew: 13

Norfolk and Suffolk-class lifeboats were a class of lifeboat operated almost exclusively off the coast of East Anglia. Developed from a yawl at the start of the 19th Century, the first boats found favour with the various rescue societies, such as the Norfolk Shipwreck Association and the Suffolk Humane Society, as well as companies of boatmen (Note: Beach companies were formed of local fishermen who rescued crews of beached ships and claimed salvage in recovering their cargoes), such as the Gorleston Rangers, before being adopted and continued in service with the Royal National Lifeboat Institution (RNLI).

Ian Cameron credits the Norfolk and Suffolks on the East Coast as "probably the busiest lifeboats of the British Isles" in the late 19th Century, launching more than 1,000 times from 1870 to 1880.

While the early boats used oars and sails, conversion to petrol engine propulsion began at the start of the 20th century. Built up to 1925, the last went out of service in 1953. Of the 65 boats constructed, at least eight still exist.

== History ==
Purpose-built lifeboats first appeared towards the end of the 18th century. Some of the first were designed by Lionel Lukin who adapted local boat designs to be more buoyant so they could operate safely in rough seas. He designed one for the Suffolk Humane Society in 1807 for use at Lowestoft. It was based on a local yawl with a shallow draft, and sails so it could reach offshore sandbanks, but oars were also provided.

The design proved successful and was adopted by other lifeboat services in East Anglia including the Norfolk Shipwreck Association. The Suffolk Humane Society merged with the Royal National Lifeboat Institution (RNLI) in 1855 as did the Norfolk Shipwreck Association in 1857.

The RNLI continued to build lifeboats to the Norfolk and Suffolk design, and stationed them at other places on the east coast, between the River Thames and the Humber.

The Norfolk and Suffolk-class lifeboat were usually of a larger size, typically being around 42 ft (13 m) in length. The boat were not self-righting, but usually had a broad beam for stability, typically 11–12 ft (3.4–3.7 m). However, some smaller Norfolk and Suffolk-class lifeboats, around 30–34 ft (9.1–10.4 m) in length, were produced for closer inshore work, and are generally referred to as 'Surf-Boats'.

The last Norfolk and Suffolk-class lifeboat was built in 1925 and was in use until 1953. The design evolved throughout this time, the last boats being built with petrol engines.

== Pulling & Sailing lifeboats ==
Lukin's Lowestoft lifeboat of 1807 was 40 feet (12.2 m) long overall and 10 ft (3.0 m) wide. It had wood wales covered with cork 15 in (380 mm) deep that projected up to 9 in (230 mm) from the sides acting as both buoyancy and fenders. Empty 22 in (560 mm) diameter casks were along the inside of the sides with two more each at the front and back of the boat to give it buoyancy. A 3-inch thick wrought iron false keel was fitted and a large volume of water ballast kept it lower in the water so that it cut through the waves instead of riding up and down over them. Using water as ballast meant the boat was lighter, and easier to handle when being launched and recovered from the beach; once in the water plugs in the bottom were opened to let water onboard. It had three masts, lug sails and 12 oars.

Most of these features continued to be used in Norfolk and Suffolk lifeboats built during the next 85 years. The empty casks were replaced by detachable wood and canvas air cases along the sides and fixed air boxes in the bow and stern like Palmer-class lifeboats. The water ballast, up to 7 tons of it, was just left in the bottom of the boat so lifeboat crews worked in wet conditions. If too much water was taken on board, the excess drained out through gaps along the side. They were rigged with two lug sails. which gave them a large canvas area allowing them to reach sandbanks 20 miles offshore.

The underside was almost flat for beach launch - the coastline having few harbours - and two drop keels gave stability when sailing.

List of early Norfolk & Suffolk lifeboats
ON (Note: ON is the RNLI's Official Number of the boat.)	Name	Length	Built	In service	Station	Comments
–	Frances Ann	40 ft (12.19 m)	1807	1807–1850	Lowestoft	(Note: 40 ft (12.19 m) x 10 ft 4 in (3.15 m) 14-oared lifeboat, funded by county subscriptions, built by B. Barcham of Lowestoft, costing £350.); Suffolk Humane Society. Condemned 1850.
–	Braybrooke	–	1821	1821–1826	Harwich	(Note: Unknown dimensions, funded by county subscriptions plus Lloyd's, built by Geo. Graham of Harwich.); Essex Lifeboat Association. Sold in 1926.
–	Unnamed	–	1825	1825–1833	Great Yarmouth	(Note: Unknown dimensions, funded by county subscriptions, built by James Beeching of Great Yarmouth.); Norfolk Shipwreck Association. Unknown fate.
Pre-160	Unnamed	39 ft (11.89 m)	1833	1833–1861	Great Yarmouth	(Note: 39 ft 0 in (11.89 m) x 10 ft 0 in (3.05 m) 12/14-oared lifeboat, funded by county subscriptions, built by Holmes of Great Yarmouth.); Suffolk Humane Society, to RNLI in 1855. Unservicable by 1861.
Pre-195	Marianne	45 ft (13.72 m)	1840	1840–1868	Pakefield	(Note: 45 ft (13.72 m) x 11 ft (3.35 m) 14/16-oared lifeboat, funded by county subscriptions, built by Wm. Teasdel of Great Yarmouth, costing £300.); Suffolk Humane Society, to RNLI in 1855. Renamed Sisters in 1868.
Pre-195	Sisters	45 ft (13.72 m)	1840	1868–1872	Pakefield	(Note: Gift of the Misses S. and L. Harris.); Disposed of at Lowestoft in 1872.
–	Solebay	40 ft (12.19 m)	1840	1841–1855	Southwold	(Note: 40 ft (12.19 m) x 11 ft (3.35 m) 12-oared lifeboat, funded by local subscriptions and RNIPLS, built by Wm. Teasdel of Great Yarmouth, costing £320.); Southwold Lifeboat Society. Condemned in 1869.
–	Solebay	40 ft (12.19 m)	1840	1855–1869	Kessingland	Southwold Lifeboat Society. Condemned in 1869.
Pre-218	Unnamed	42 ft (12.80 m)	1846	1846–1865	Caister	(Note: 42 ft (12.80 m) x 11 ft 6 in (3.51 m) 14/16-oared lifeboat, funded by county subscriptions, built by Branford of Great Yarmouth, costing £250.); Norfolk Shipwreck Association, to RNLI in 1857. Condemned and sold in 1865.
Pre-229	Victoria	42 ft (12.80 m)	1850	1850–1868	Lowestoft	(Note: 42 ft (12.80 m) x 11 ft 6 in (3.51 m) 14-oared lifeboat, funded by county subscriptions, built by Samuel R. Sparham of Lowestoft, costing £250.); Suffolk Humane Society, to RNLI in 1855. Renamed Laetitia in 1868.
Pre-229	Laetitia	42 ft (12.80 m)	1850	1868–1876	Lowestoft	Condemned and Broken up in 1876.
–	Rescuer	42 ft (12.80 m)	1853	1853–1868	Gorleston	(Note: 42 ft (12.80 m) x 12 ft (3.66 m) lifeboat, funded by the Gorleston Ranger Corps, built by James Beeching of Great Yarmouth.); Gorleston Rangers lifeboat. Capsized with the loss of 13 crew, 13 January 1866. Capsized after a collision, with the loss of six crew, 3 December 1867. Transferred to Winterton in 1868.
–	Rescuer	42 ft (12.80 m)	1853	1868–1878	Winterton	Gorleston Rangers lifeboat. Capsized with the loss of 13 crew, 13 January 1866. Capsized after a collision, with the loss of six crew, 3 December 1867. Transferred to Winterton in 1868.
–	Royal Albert	44 ft 0 in (13.41 m)	1854	1854–1894	Scratby	(Note: 44 ft (13.41 m) x 13 ft (3.96 m) 14-oared lifeboat, funded by the California Beachmen's Company, built by James Beeching of Great Yarmouth, costing £200.); California Beachmen's Company. Transferred to Walton-on-the-Naze and renamed True to the Core in 1894.
–	True to the Core	44 ft 0 in (13.41 m)	1854	1894–1897	Walton-on-the-Naze	Funded by Walton-on-Naze Volunteer Lifeboat Society. Fate unknown.
28	Harriett	40 ft 0 in (12.19 m)	1855	1855–1869	Southwold	(Note: ON (28). 40 ft (12.19 m) x 11 ft 6 in (3.51 m) 12/14-oared lifeboat, funded from local subscription, built by James Beeching of Great Yarmouth, costing £200.); Renamed London Coal Exchange in 1869.
28	London Coal Exchange	40 ft 0 in (12.19 m)	1855	1869–1893	Southwold	(Note: ON (28). Funded by the Coal Exchange, London); Sold in 1893.
–	Ranger	40 ft 0 in (12.19 m)	1856	1858–????	Gorleston	(Note: 40 ft (12.19 m) 18-oared lifeboat, funded by the Gorleston Ranger Co., built by James Beeching of Great Yarmouth, costing £200.); Gorleston Rangers lifeboat. Service dates and fate unknown.
20	Brave Robert Shedden	40 ft 0 in (12.19 m)	1861	1861–1868	Great Yarmouth	(Note: ON (20). 40 ft (12.19 m) x 11 ft 3 in (3.43 m) 12-oared lifeboat, legacy of Miss W. S. Watson of London, built by James Beeching of Great Yarmouth, costing £210.); Renamed Mark Lane in 1868, in reference to the donors, members of the London Corn Exchange.
20	Mark Lane	42 ft (12.80 m)	1861	1868–1883	Great Yarmouth	(Note: ON (20). Gift of the London Corn Exchange. Rebuilt 42 ft 3 in (12.88 m) x 11 ft 9 in (3.58 m) in 1871.); Condemned and Sold, 1889.
20	Mark Lane	42 ft (12.80 m)	1861	1883–1889	Gorleston	Condemned and Sold, 1889.
–	Friend of All Nations	43 ft 0 in (13.11 m)	1863	1863–1925	Gorleston	(Note: 43 ft (13.11 m) x 12 ft 2 in (3.71 m) 12-oared lifeboat, funded from local subscription, built by Jas. Critten of Cobholm, costing £400.); Gorleston Rangers lifeboat. Sold in 1925.
Pre-427	Birmingham No. 2	42 ft 0 in (12.80 m)	1865	1865–1878	Caister	(Note: 42 ft (12.80 m) x 11 ft 10 in (3.61 m) 14-oared lifeboat, gift of the Birmingham LB fund, built by Mills and Blake of Great Yarmouth, costing £238.); Renamed Covent Garden in 1878.
Pre-427	Covent Garden	42 ft 0 in (12.80 m)	1865	1878–1883	Caister	(Note: Gift of the Covent Garden LB fund.); Condemned in 1883.
–	Refuge	42 ft (12.80 m)	1866	1866–1888	Gorleston	(Note: 42 ft (12.80 m) x 12 ft (3.66 m) lifeboat, funded by the Gorleston Storm Co., constructor unknown.); Gorleston Rangers lifeboat. Capsized with the loss of four crew, 10 November 1888. Condemned 1888.
16	Husband	36 ft 0 in (10.97 m)	1869	1869–1879	Corton	(Note: ON (16). 36 ft (10.97 m) x 10 ft 6 in (3.20 m) 14-oared lifeboat, gift of Mrs Geo. Davis of Clapham, built by James Beeching of Great Yarmouth, costing £180.); Transferred to Winterton in 1879.
16	Husband	36 ft 0 in (10.97 m)	1869	1879–1890	Winterton No.2	Sold in 1892.
25	Bolton	42 ft 5 in (12.93 m)	1870	1870–1893	Kessingland	(Note: ON (25). 42 ft 5 in (12.93 m) x 12 ft (3.66 m) 12/14-oared lifeboat, gift of the Bolton LB fund, built by James Beeching of Great Yarmouth, costing £270.); Sold in 1893.
14	British Workman	42 ft 4 in (12.90 m)	1870	1870–1893	Palling No.2	(Note: ON (14). 40 ft 4 in (12.29 m) x 11 ft 6 in (3.51 m) 14-oared lifeboat, gift of The British Workman LB fund, built by James Beeching of Great Yarmouth, costing £273.); Sold in 1893.
23	Sisters	46 ft 3 in (14.10 m)	1872	1872–1876	Pakefield	(Note: ON (23). 46 ft 3 in (14.10 m) x 12 ft (3.66 m) 14-oared lifeboat, gift of the misses S. and L. Harris, built by Samuel R. Sparham of Lowestoft, costing £276.); Renamed The Two Sisters, Mary and Hannah in 1876.
23	The Two Sisters, Mary and Hannah	46 ft 3 in (14.10 m)	1872	1876–1886	Pakefield	(Note: ON (23).Legacy of Mr T Perkin.); Sold in 1910.
23	The Two Sisters, Mary and Hannah	46 ft 3 in (14.10 m)	1872	1886–1890	Lowestoft	Sold in 1910.
23	The Two Sisters, Mary and Hannah	46 ft 3 in (14.10 m)	1872	1890–1910	Pakefield	Sold in 1910.
22	Samuel Plimsoll	44 ft 4 in (13.51 m)	1876	1876–1905	Lowestoft	(Note: ON (22). 44 ft 4 in (13.51 m) x 12 ft 3 in (3.73 m) 14-oared lifeboat, gift of the Samuel Plimsoll LB fund, Derby and Liverpool built by Samuel R. Sparham of Lowestoft, costing £276.); Sold in 1905.
17	Covent Garden	42 ft 4 in (12.90 m)	1882	1883–1899	Caister	(Note: ON (17). 42 ft 4 in (12.90 m) x 11 ft 6 in (3.51 m) 14-oared lifeboat, gift of the Covent Garden LB fund, built by James Beeching of Great Yarmouth, costing £300.); Sold and broken up in 1900.
–	Caroline Hamilton	48 ft 0 in (14.63 m)	1883	1883–1893	Lowestoft	(Note: 48 ft (14.63 m) x 13 ft 2 in (4.01 m) lifeboat, funded and operated by the Gorleston Volunteer Lifeboat Society, built by Samuel R. Sparham of Lowestoft, costing £450.); Gorleston Volunteer Lifeboat Society. Sold in 1893.
27	Charles Bury	38 ft 6 in (11.73 m)	1884	1884–1897	Kessingland No.3	(Note: ON (27). 38 ft 6 in (11.73 m) x 12 ft 5 in (3.78 m) 12-oared lifeboat, legacy of Mr Chas. Bury of Nazing, built by James Beeching of Great Yarmouth, costing £363.); Sold in 1897.
233	Mark Lane	44 ft 0 in (13.41 m)	1889	1889–1892	Gorleston	(Note: ON (233). 44 ft (13.41 m) x 12 ft 3 in (3.73 m) 12-oared lifeboat, gift of the London Corn Exchange and Baltic Exchange LB fund, built by James Beeching of Great Yarmouth, costing £315.); Transferred to the Relief fleet, 1892.
233	Reserve No. 1	44 ft 0 in (13.41 m)	1889	1892–1899	Relief Fleet	Renamed Margaret on transfer to Winterton No.2, 1899
233	Margaret	44 ft 0 in (13.41 m)	1889	1899–1907	Winterton No.2	(Note: ON (233). Legacy of Miss Mary Eason of London.); Condemned and sold in 1907
270	Margaret	44 ft (13.41 m)	1889	1890–1899	Winterton No.2	(Note: ON (270). 44 ft (13.41 m) x 14 ft 2 in (4.32 m) 12-oared lifeboat, legacy of Miss Mary Eason of London, built by James Beeching of Great Yarmouth, costing £368.); Transferred to the Relief fleet in 1899.
270	Reserve No.1	44 ft (13.41 m)	1889	1899–1902	Aldeburgh	Sold in 1924.
270	Reserve No.1	44 ft (13.41 m)	1889	1902–1924	Relief fleet	Sold in 1924.
–	Elizabeth Simpson	47 ft 8 in (14.53 m)	1889	1889–1926	Gorleston	(Note: 47 ft 8 in (14.53 m) x 13 ft 6 in (4.11 m) lifeboat, gift of Miss Elizabeth Simpson of Stone, built by James Beeching of Great Yarmouth.); Gorleston Rangers lifeboat. Launched on service 119 times, and rescued 441 lives. Motor conversion in 1926.
288	Stock Exchange	46 ft (14.02 m)	1890	1890–1892	Lowestoft No.2	(Note: ON (288). 46 ft (14.02 m) x 12 ft 9 in (3.89 m) lifeboat, gift of the London Stock Exchange, built by Wm. T. Ellis of Lowestoft, costing £373.); Renamed Mark Lane when transferred to Gorleston in 1892.
288	Mark Lane	46 ft (14.02 m)	1890	1892–1921	Gorleston	(Note: ON (288). Gift of the London Corn Exchange and Baltic Exchange LB fund.); Sold in 1922. Renamed Gorleston, a converted houseboat, broken up at Felixstowe Ferry, 1978.
304	Aldeburgh	46 ft (14.02 m)	1890	1890–1899	Aldeburgh	(Note: ON (304). 46 ft (14.02 m) x 12 ft 7 in (3.84 m) 14-oared lifeboat, gift of an anonymous donor (who also paid for a lifeboat at Whitby), built by J. H. Critten of Great Yarmouth, costing £373.); Capsized with the loss of seven crew, 7 December 1899. Broken up in 1900.
327	Beauchamp	36 ft (10.97 m)	1891	1892–1901	Caister No.2	(Note: ON (327). 36 ft (10.97 m) x 10 ft 6 in (3.20 m) 12-oared lifeboat, gift of Sir R. Proctor-Beauchamp, Bt, built by J. H. Critten of Great Yarmouth, costing £266.)The lifeboat in the Caister lifeboat disaster which was blown back to the beach and capsized leading to the deaths of nine of the crew, 13 November 1901. Sold in 1901. Renamed Triton, used as a Broadland trip boat. Broken up in 1966.

Pre ON numbers are unofficial numbers used by the Lifeboat Enthusiast Society to reference early lifeboats not included on the official RNLI list.

List of early Norfolk and Suffolk 'Surf-Boats'
ON	Name	Length	Built	In service	Station	Comments
Pre-162	Unnamed	25 ft 0 in (7.62 m)	1833	1833–1858	Great Yarmouth No.2	(Note: 25 ft 0 in (7.62 m) x 8 ft 0 in (2.44 m) 10-oared lifeboat, funded by local subscription, built by Branford of Lowestoft.); Sold in 1858.
19	Unnamed	28 ft 3 in (8.61 m)	1859	1859–1866	Great Yarmouth No.2	(Note: ON (19). 28 ft 3 in (8.61 m) x 9 ft 0 in (2.74 m) 10-oared lifeboat, an anonymous gift, built by James Beeching of Great Yarmouth, costing £179.); Renamed Duff in 1866.
19	Duff	28 ft 3 in (8.61 m)	1859	1866–1875	Great Yarmouth No.2	(Note: ON (19). An anonymous gift); Renamed Abraham Thomas in 1875.
19	Abraham Thomas	28 ft 3 in (8.61 m)	1859	1875–1892	Great Yarmouth No.2	(Note: ON (19). Gift of the late Mrs Balderson.); Capsized 18 January 1881 with the loss of six crew. Sold in 1892.
15	Anne Maria	32 ft 0 in (9.75 m)	1860	1861–1875	Winterton	(Note: ON (15). 32 ft 0 in (9.75 m) x 10 ft 0 in (3.05 m) 12-oared lifeboat, gift of Capt. W. Harris, built by James Beeching of Great Yarmouth, costing £120.); Renamed Edward Birkbeck in 1875.
15	Edward Birkbeck	32 ft 0 in (9.75 m)	1860	1875–1896	Winterton	(Note: ON (15). Funded by the RNLI.); Condemned and broken up, 1896
18	Boys	32 ft 0 in (9.75 m)	1867	1867–1875	Caister No.2	(Note: ON (18). 32 ft 6 in (9.91 m) x 10 ft 0 in (3.05 m) 12-oared lifeboat, gift of the Routledge Magazine for Boys, built by James Beeching of Great Yarmouth, costing £153.); Renamed Godsend in 1875.
18	Godsend	32 ft 0 in (9.75 m)	1867	1875–1892	Caister No.2	(Note: ON (18). Gift of Lady Bourchier of Hampton Court Palace.); Sold in 1892. Acquired by the Frinton Volunteer Lifeboat Society in 1901, and renamed Sailors Friend.
18	Sailors Friend	32 ft 0 in (9.75 m)	1867	1901–1907	Frinton-on-Sea	Frinton-on-Sea Lifeboat Society. Sold in 1907.
26	Grace & Lalley of Broad Oak	32 ft 0 in (9.75 m)	1867	1867–1871	Kessingland	(Note: ON (26). 32 ft 0 in (9.75 m) x 10 ft 0 in (3.05 m) 12-oared lifeboat, gift of Mr J. Hargreaves of Broad Oak, Accrington, built by James Beeching of Great Yarmouth, costing £156.); Renamed St Michaels, Paddington in 1879.
26	Grace & Lalley of Broad Oak	32 ft 0 in (9.75 m)	1867	1871–1879	Kessingland No.2	Renamed St Michaels, Paddington in 1879.
26	St Michaels, Paddington	32 ft 0 in (9.75 m)	1867	1879–1897	Kessingland No.2	(Note: ON (26). Gift of St Michael's LB fund.); Sold in 1897.
Pre-521	George	32 ft 0 in (9.75 m)	1869	1870–1881	Lowestoft No.2	(Note: 32 ft 0 in (9.75 m) x 10 ft 0 in (3.05 m) 12-oared lifeboat, gift of Miss Mary Ann Leicester of Bayswater, built by James Beeching of Great Yarmouth, costing £150.); Sold in 1881.
21	Leicester	30 ft 0 in (9.14 m)	1870	1870–1883	Gorleston	(Note: ON (21). 30 ft 3 in (9.22 m) x 9 ft 2 in (2.79 m) 10-oared lifeboat, gift of the City of Leicester LB fund, built by Forrestt of Limehouse, London, costing £153.); Sold in 1894.
21	Leicester	30 ft 0 in (9.14 m)	1870	1883–1894	Gorleston No.2	Sold in 1894.
24	Henry Burford, RN	30 ft 0 in (9.14 m)	1870	1871–1895	Pakefield	(Note: ON (24). 30 ft 3 in (9.22 m) x 9 ft 2 in (2.79 m) 12-oared lifeboat, legacy of Mr John Legrew, built by James Beeching of Great Yarmouth, costing £142.); Broken up in 1895.
29	Dorinda and Barbara	30 ft 0 in (9.14 m)	1871	1871–1882	Theddlethorpe	(Note: ON (29). 30 ft 0 in (9.14 m) x 9 ft 0 in (2.74 m) 12-oared lifeboat, gift of Mrs B. Carslake of Brixton, built by James Beeching of Great Yarmouth, costing £145.); Renamed Quiver No.2 in 1882.
29	Quiver No. 2	30 ft 0 in (9.14 m)	1871	1882–1897	Southwold No.2	(Note: ON (29). Gift of The Quiver LB fund.); Displayed at the Imperial Institute in London from 1897 until 1917.
319	Unnamed	32 ft 0 in (9.75 m)	1890	1891–1895	Unallocated (Spare)	(Note: ON (319). 32 ft 3 in (9.83 m) x 10 ft 0 in (3.05 m) lifeboat, from RNLI funds, built by Wm. T. Ellis of Lowestoft, costing £211.); Used in the Montrose lifeboat trials in 1893. Sold to Crown Agents for Accra, Ghana in 1895.
326	Thora Zelma	31 ft 0 in (9.45 m)	1891	1892–1904	Gorleston No.3	(Note: ON (326). 31 ft 0 in (9.45 m) x 9 ft 0 in (2.74 m) 12-oared lifeboat, gift of Mr J. McLaren-Smith of Temple, built by James Beeching of Great Yarmouth, costing £231); Transferred to the Relief Fleet, 1904.
326	Reserve No. 8	31 ft 0 in (9.45 m)	1891	1904–1913	Relief fleet	Condemned and Sold, October 1913.
329	John Burch	32 ft 0 in (9.75 m)	1892	1892–1912	Great Yarmouth	(Note: ON (329). 32 ft 0 in (9.75 m) x 9 ft 6 in (2.90 m) 12-oared lifeboat, gift of Mrs Burch of King's Lynn, built by James Beeching of Great Yarmouth, costing £227.); Sold in 1919. Renamed Crescent. Last reported as a yacht at St Olaves in the 1970s.

== Improved design ==
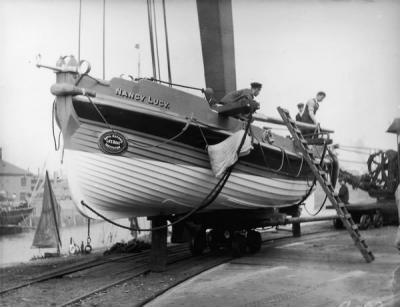
Norfolk and Suffolk-class 'Surf-Boat' Nancy Lucy (ON 506) in 1906

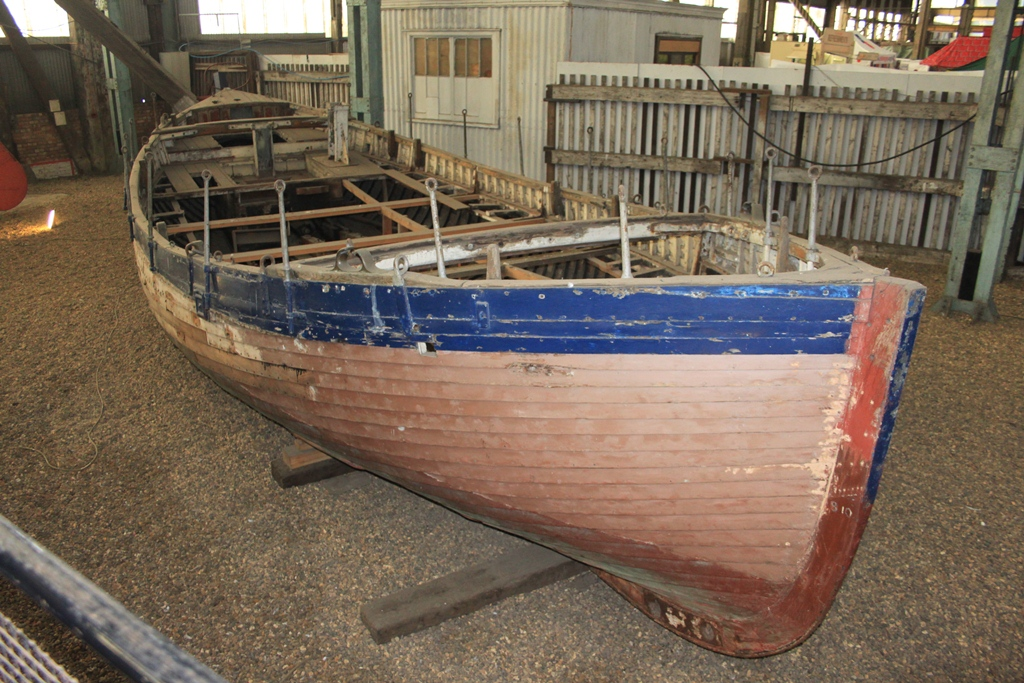
St Paul (ON 406), in unrestored state, in the RNLI Heritage Collection at Chatham Historic Dockyard

The RNLI staged a trial of sailing lifeboats between 12 February and 19 April 1892 (Note: The trials were delayed from 1892 because the fishermen who manned the boats were engaged in the seasonal herring fisheries) whenever weather conditions provided. Of the four different lifeboats; a 46 ft (14 m) Norfolk and Suffolk, a standard self-righting type, a "Southport type" (designed by G L Watson), and a Tubular lifeboat (a catamaran style), the latter of which had found favour predominantly at New Brighton and Rhyl, the Norfolk and Suffolk class was deemed the least effective overall. Although it did score well for launching or recovering from a flat beach into surf, it was rated last in terms of capacity for carrying the rescued.

The trial was held at Lowestoft and that station's two-year-old lifeboat was used. The water ballast proved to be a problem, the boat getting into difficulty in the surf close to the beach before the water ballast could be taken in. Even when properly ballasted, the boat could become unstable as water was able to shift side-to-side and back-and-front.

Boats built after the trial had the water ballast constrained in tanks beneath a deck in the centre of the boat, where it was not able to shift so much. Valves were fitted to allow water above the deck to drain out.

An alteration was also made to the shape of the wales so that waves flowed over them better; in the past sometimes waves coming from the side got caught under the wale and pushed the boat over the opposite side.

List of Improved Norfolk & Suffolk lifeboats
ON	Name	Length	Built	In service	Station	Comments
351	Hearts of Oak	40 ft (12.19 m)	1893	1893–1917	Palling	(Note: ON (351). 40 ft (12.19 m) x 12 ft (3.66 m) 14-oared lifeboat, gift of the Hearts of Oak Benefit Society, built by Wm. T. Ellis of Lowestoft, costing £416.); Sold in 1919. Renamed Mayflower, later Valentina. Broken up at Willow Wren Wharf, Southall, 1990.
352	Bolton	43 ft (13.11 m)	1893	1893–1902	Kessingland	(Note: ON (352). 43 ft (13.11 m) x 12 ft 9 in (3.89 m) 12/14-oared lifeboat, gift of the Bolton LB fund, built by Chambers and Colby of Lowestoft, costing £639.); Sold in 1926. Renamed Juno, later Ladies of Bolton. Converted houseboat, as of December 2025 holiday accommodation Ole Gal on a farm at Saint Helena, Horsford, Norfolk.
352	Bolton	43 ft (13.11 m)	1893	1902	Aldeburgh	Sold in 1926. Renamed Juno, later Ladies of Bolton. Converted houseboat, as of December 2025 holiday accommodation Ole Gal on a farm at Saint Helena, Horsford, Norfolk.
352	Bolton	43 ft (13.11 m)	1893	1902–1918	Kessingland	Sold in 1926. Renamed Juno, later Ladies of Bolton. Converted houseboat, as of December 2025 holiday accommodation Ole Gal on a farm at Saint Helena, Horsford, Norfolk.
352	Bolton	43 ft (13.11 m)	1893	1918–1925	Southwold	Sold in 1926. Renamed Juno, later Ladies of Bolton. Converted houseboat, as of December 2025 holiday accommodation Ole Gal on a farm at Saint Helena, Horsford, Norfolk.
353	Alfred Corry	44 ft 0 in (13.41 m)	1893	1893–1918	Southwold	(Note: ON (353). 44 ft 0 in (13.41 m) x 13 ft 0 in (3.96 m) (12/14-oared) lifeboat, legacy of Mr A. J. Corry of Putney, built by James Beeching of Great Yarmouth, costing £490.); Sold in 1919. Renamed Alba, Albemarle and Thorfinn. Now on display as Alfred Corry at the Alfred Corry Museum, Southwold, the relocated former Cromer lifeboat house.
356	Stock Exchange	46 ft 0 in (14.02 m)	1893	1893–1912	Lowestoft No. 2	(Note: ON (356). 46 ft 0 in (14.02 m) x 12 ft 9 in (3.89 m) (14-oared) lifeboat, gift of the London Stock Exchange LB fund, built by James Beeching of Great Yarmouth, costing £530.); Transferred to the Relief fleet, 1912
356	Reserve No. 1A	46 ft 0 in (14.02 m)	1893	1912–1918	Relief fleet	Sold in 1919.
–	True to the Core	40 ft 0 in (12.19 m)	1897	1897–1909	Walton-on-the-Naze	(Note: 40 ft 0 in (12.19 m) x 13 ft 0 in (3.96 m) (12-oared) lifeboat, funded by the Walton-on-the-Naze Boatmen's Co., built by Jn. Houston of Rowhedge, costing £437.); Walton-on-Naze Volunteer Lifeboat Society. Motor conversion with 45-hp Brooke engine in 1909. Sold c.1913.
406	St Paul	38 ft 0 in (11.58 m)	1897	1897–1918	Kessingland No.2	(Note: ON (406). 38 ft 0 in (11.58 m) x 12 ft 0 in (3.66 m) (12-oared) lifeboat, gift of Mr J. Paul of Barnes, built by James Beeching of Great Yarmouth, costing £530.); Sold in 1931. Renamed Stormcock. On display since April 1996 as St Paul in the RNLI Heritage Collection at Chatham Historic Dockyard.
406	St Paul	38 ft 0 in (11.58 m)	1897	1918–1931	Kessingland	Sold in 1931. Renamed Stormcock. On display since April 1996 as St Paul in the RNLI Heritage Collection at Chatham Historic Dockyard.
430	James Stevens No. 9	38 ft 0 in (11.58 m)	1899	1899–1923	Southend-on-Sea	(Note: ON (430). 38 ft 0 in (11.58 m) x 12 ft 0 in (3.66 m) (12-oared) lifeboat, legacy of Mr J. Stevens of Birmingham, built by Thames Ironworks of Blackwall, London, costing £865.); Sold in 1923. Renamed Viking. Destroyed by a bomb at Dover in World War II.
431	Covent Garden	40 ft 0 in (12.19 m)	1899	1899–1919	Caister	(Note: ON (431). 40 ft 0 in (12.19 m) x 12 ft 0 in (3.66 m) (12-oared) lifeboat, gift of the Covent Garden LB fund, built by Thames Ironworks of Blackwall, London, costing £1,295.); Sold and broken up in 1920.
432	James Stevens No.14	43 ft 0 in (13.11 m)	1900	1900–1905	Walton-on-the-Naze	(Note: ON (432). 43 ft 0 in (13.11 m) x 12 ft 6 in (3.81 m) (12-oared) lifeboat, legacy of Mr J. Stevens of Birmingham, built by Thames Ironworks of Blackwall, London, costing £1,420.); Stood down in 1905 for an engine to be fitted. Returned to service in 1907.
482	City of Winchester	46 ft 0 in (14.02 m)	1902	1902–1928	Aldeburgh	(Note: ON (482). 46 ft 0 in (14.02 m) x 14 ft 0 in (4.27 m) (12-oared) lifeboat, gift of the Winchester LB fund, built by Thames Ironworks of Blackwall, London, costing £2,640.); Sold in 1928. Renamed Ellen Gordon, Houseboat, broken up at Maldon in 1980.
543	Kentwell	46 ft 0 in (14.02 m)	1905	1905–1921	Lowestoft	(Note: ON (543). 46 ft 0 in (14.02 m) x 12 ft 6 in (3.81 m) (14-oared) lifeboat, legacy of Mrs S. A. Moore of London, built by Thames Ironworks of Blackwall, London, costing £2,197.); Sold in 1928.
543	Kentwell	46 ft 0 in (14.02 m)	1905	1922–1924	Gorleston	Sold in 1928.
543	Kentwell	46 ft 0 in (14.02 m)	1905	1924–1928	Relief fleet	Sold in 1928.
–	Sailor's Friend	40 ft 0 in (12.19 m)	1907	1907–1917	Frinton	(Note: 40 ft 0 in (12.19 m) lifeboat, funded by the Frinton-on-Sea Lifeboat Society, built by J. & H. Cann of Harwich, costing £360.); Frinton-on-Sea Lifeboat Society. Sank in 1917, subsequently sold.
589	Eleanor Brown	44 ft 0 in (13.41 m)	1909	1909–1924	Winterton	(Note: ON (589). 44 ft 6 in (13.56 m) x 12 ft 6 in (3.81 m) (12-oared) lifeboat, legacy of Mrs E. Brown of Wandsworth, built by Thames Ironworks of Blackwall, London, costing £2,015.); Transferred to Relief fleet in 1924.
589	Reserve No. 1C	44 ft 0 in (13.41 m)	1909	1924–1931	Relief fleet	Sold 1928. Renamed Mary. Houseboat at Morston Quay, Norfolk, December 2025.
607	James Leith	42 ft 0 in (12.80 m)	1910	1910–1919	Pakefield	(Note: ON (607). 42 ft 6 in (12.95 m) x 12 ft 6 in (3.81 m) (12-oared) lifeboat, legacy of Mr Jas. Leath of London, built by Thames Ironworks of Blackwall, London, costing £1,934.); Sold in 1936. Renamed Robin Hood II, On display since April 1996 as James Leith in the RNLI Heritage Collection at Chatham Historic Dockyard, December 2025.
607	James Leith	42 ft 0 in (12.80 m)	1910	1919–1929	Caister	Sold in 1936. Renamed Robin Hood II, On display since April 1996 as James Leith in the RNLI Heritage Collection at Chatham Historic Dockyard, December 2025.
607	James Leith	42 ft 0 in (12.80 m)	1910	1930–1935	Aldeburgh	Sold in 1936. Renamed Robin Hood II, On display since April 1996 as James Leith in the RNLI Heritage Collection at Chatham Historic Dockyard, December 2025.
656	Hearts of Oak	40 ft 0 in (12.19 m)	1918	1918–1929	Palling	(Note: ON (656). 40 ft 0 in (12.19 m) x 12 ft 0 in (3.66 m) (12-oared) lifeboat, gift of the Hearts of Oak Benefit Society, built by Summers and Payne of Southampton, completed by S. E. Saunders of Cowes.); Sold in 1934. Renamed Wander Bird. Last reported as a yacht at Frontignan, France, 2002.
656	Hearts of Oak	40 ft 0 in (12.19 m)	1918	1929–1934	Relief fleet	Sold in 1934. Renamed Wander Bird. Last reported as a yacht at Frontignan, France, 2002.

List of improved Norfolk & Suffolk 'Surf Boats'
ON	Name	Length	Built	In service	Station	Comments
371	Leicester	32 ft 0 in (9.75 m)	1894	1894–1923	Gorleston No.2	(Note: ON (371). 32 ft 0 in (9.75 m) x 9 ft 0 in (2.74 m) (12-oared) lifeboat, gift of the City of Leicester LB fund, RNLI funds, built by Critten of Great Yarmouth, costing £328.); Condemned and sold in 1923.
397	Edward Birkbeck	32 ft 0 in (9.75 m)	1896	1896–1925	Winterton	(Note: ON (397). 32 ft 0 in (9.75 m) x 9 ft 0 in (2.74 m) (12-oared) lifeboat, from RNLI funds, built by James Beeching of Great Yarmouth, costing £436.); Sold in 1925. Renamed Mirosa. As of December 2025 awaiting restoration as Edward Birkbeck at Winterton-on-Sea, Norfolk, .
405	Rescue	32 ft 0 in (9.75 m)	1897	1897–1920	Southwold No.2	(Note: ON (405). 32 ft 0 in (9.75 m) x 9 ft 0 in (2.74 m) (12-oared) lifeboat, legacy of Mr J. B. Barkworth of Havant, built by Reynolds of Lowestoft, costing £402.); Sold in 1920. Renamed Mermaid. Last reported in August 1969 as a houseboat at Horning.
506	Nancy Lucy	35 ft 0 in (10.67 m)	1903	1903–1929	Caister No.2	(Note: ON (506). 35 ft 0 in (10.67 m) x 10 ft 9 in (3.28 m) (12-oared) lifeboat, gift of Sir Henry W. Lucy, of London, built by Thames Ironworks of Blackwall, London, costing £1,603.); Sold in 1929.
629	Hugh Taylor	34 ft 0 in (10.36 m)	1912	1912–1919	Great Yarmouth	(Note: ON (629). 34 ft 0 in (10.36 m) x 10 ft 0 in (3.05 m) (12-oared) lifeboat, gift of Mrs E. Stratford of London, built by Thames Ironworks of Blackwall, London, costing £1,250.); Sold in 1937. Renamed Johannes J, last reported in 1987 as a yacht in Dordrecht, The Netherlands.
629	Hugh Taylor	34 ft 0 in (10.36 m)	1912	1919–1922	Pakefield	Sold in 1937. Renamed Johannes J, last reported in 1987 as a yacht in Dordrecht, The Netherlands.
629	Reserve No. 1A	34 ft 0 in (10.36 m)	1912	1922–1929	Relief fleet	Sold in 1937. Renamed Johannes J, last reported in 1987 as a yacht in Dordrecht, The Netherlands.
629	Hugh Taylor	34 ft 0 in (10.36 m)	1912	1929–1931	Aldeburgh	Sold in 1937. Renamed Johannes J, last reported in 1987 as a yacht in Dordrecht, The Netherlands.
629	Hugh Taylor	34 ft 0 in (10.36 m)	1912	1931–1936	Kessingland	Sold in 1937. Renamed Johannes J, last reported in 1987 as a yacht in Dordrecht, The Netherlands.

== Motor lifeboats ==
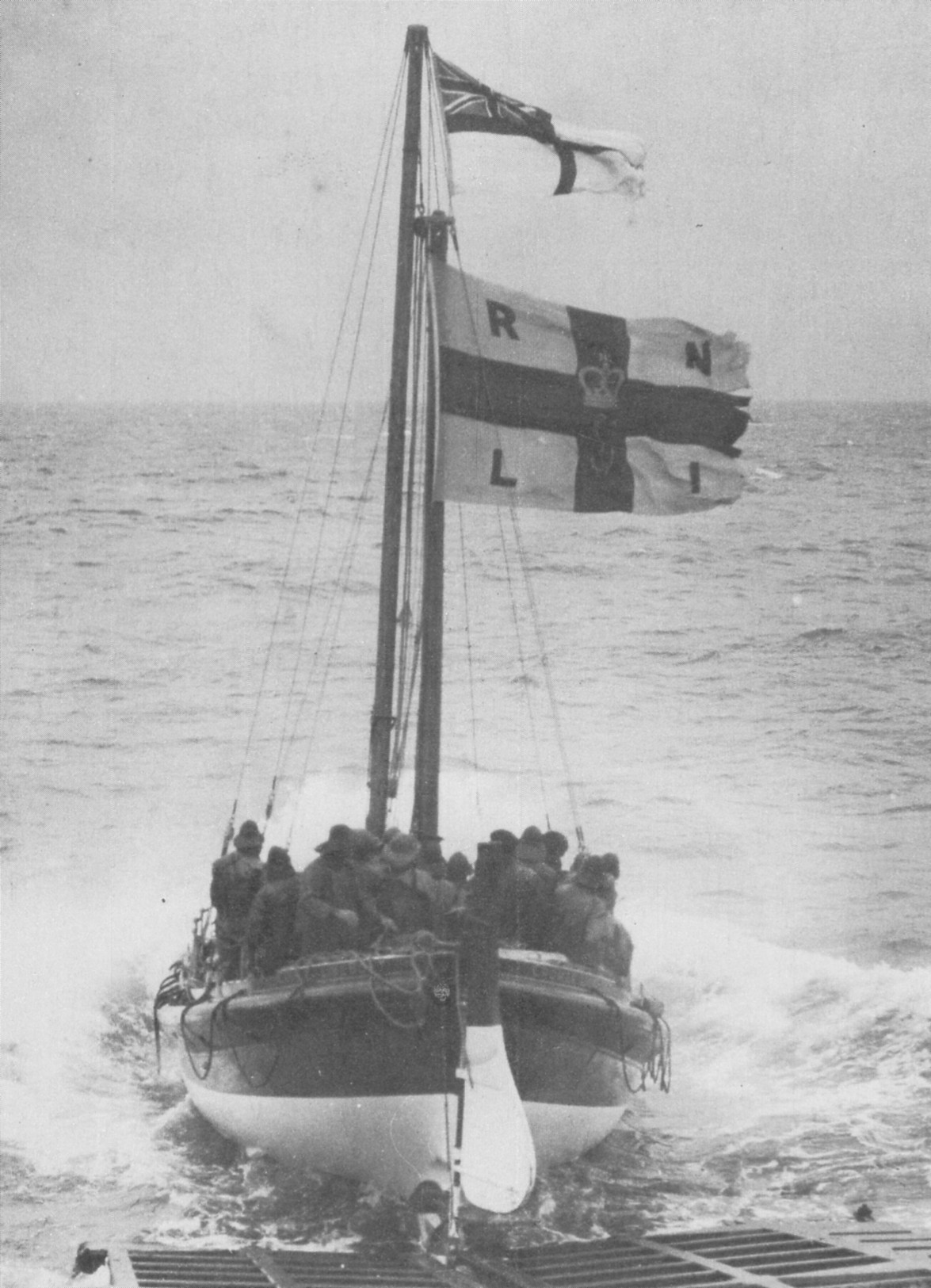
RNLB H. F. Bailey (ON 670), the first of four boats to carry the name of H.F. Bailey, launching down the slipway at Cromer

The RNLI deployed its first experimental motor lifeboat in 1904 and in 1905 converted three pulling and sailing lifeboats into motor lifeboats. One of these was Walton-on-the-Naze's Norfolk and Suffolk-class lifeboat James Stevens No.14. It was fitted with a four cylinder Blake petrol engine delivering 40 hp at 550 rpm. Tests on 7 June 1906 measured the converted lifeboat's mean speed over three double runs to be 6.952 knots (12.875 km/h). It was then sent to Harwich for sea trials in October. These were completed in February 1907, after which the boat returned to Walton-on-the-Naze to take up duty.

The engines in motor lifeboats were regarded as a supplement to sails at first but the experimental conversions were deemed a success. Construction of new motor lifeboats was protracted as it was difficult to obtain the parts and skilled staff, especially during World War I. Three Norfolk and Suffolk class motor lifeboats were built for service at East Anglian stations in the 1920s. The engines were a 4-cylinder 60 bhp (45 kW) unit in the John and Mary Meiklam Of Gladswood of 1921, and six-cylinder 80 bhp (60 kW) engines in the two boats built in 1923 and 1925.

The capability of motor lifeboats over the Pulling and Sailing type was shown in the rescue of the crew of the Hopelyn when it ran aground on the Scroby Sands in October 1922. The Caister boat was unable to make way from against the gale force winds, the Gorleston boat, Kentwell, had to be towed out by a steam tug but could not get alongside the broken ship. The Agnes Cross motor lifeboat though was launched from Lowestoft and reached the Hopelyn getting close enough to take on the 24 crew from their refuge on the bridge and get them safely to Great Yarmouth. (Note: For their efforts over the two days, 27 medals (two gold, three silver and 23 bronze) were awarded to the lifeboat men of Kentwell and Agnes Cross)

List of Norfolk & Suffolk motor lifeboats
ON	Name	Length	Built	In service	Station	Comments
–	Elizabeth Simpson	47 ft 8 in (14.53 m)	1889	1926–1939	Gorleston	Motor conversion of an early Norfolk and Suffolk boat in 1926. Gorleston Rangers lifeboat. Sold in 1948.
–	True to the Core	40 ft 0 in (12.19 m)	1897	1909–1911	Walton-on-the-Naze	Motor conversion with 45-hp Brooke, 1909. Walton-on-Naze Volunteer Lifeboat Society. Sold c.1913.
432	James Stevens No.14	43 ft 0 in (13.11 m)	1900	1907–1928	Walton-on-the-Naze	Motor conversion with 40-hp Blake 4-cylinder petrol engine in 1906, returned to service in 1907. Sold in 1928. Renamed Mardee. As of August 2025 stored ashore at Titchmarsh Marine, Walton-on-the-Naze.
663	John and Mary Meiklam of Gladswood	46 ft 6 in (14.17 m)	1921	1921	Gorleston No. 1	(Note: ON (663). 46 ft 6 in (14.17 m) x 12 ft 9 in (3.89 m) lifeboat, legacies of Miss J. Meiklam and Mrs May, plus gift of Mrs Moysey, built by S. E. Saunders of Cowes, costing £6,620.); Transferred to Lowestoft in 1921, renamed Agnes Cross. (The original name was reused by ON 670 in 1924).
663	Agnes Cross	46 ft 6 in (14.17 m)	1921	1921–1939	Lowestoft	(Note: ON (663). Gift of Mrs Cross.); Sold in October 1952. Renamed Wimp, last reported at Aden, 1955.
663	Agnes Cross	46 ft 6 in (14.17 m)	1921	1940–1941	Dover	Sold in October 1952. Renamed Wimp, last reported at Aden, 1955.
663	Agnes Cross	46 ft 6 in (14.17 m)	1921	1941–1952	Relief fleet	Sold in October 1952. Renamed Wimp, last reported at Aden, 1955.
670	H.F. Bailey	46 ft 6 in (14.17 m)	1923	1923–1924	Cromer	(Note: ON (670). 46 ft 6 in (14.17 m) x 12 ft 9 in (3.89 m) lifeboat, legacy of Mr Bailey, built by J. Samuel White of Cowes, with single 60-hp Tylor engine, costing £10,933.); Renamed John and Mary Meiklam of Gladswood in 1924, the original name was then reused on Watson-class lifeboat ON 694.
670	John and Mary Meiklam of Gladswood	46 ft 6 in (14.17 m)	1923	1924–1939	Gorleston No. 1	(Note: ON (670). Legacies of Miss J. Meiklam and Mrs May, plus gift of Mrs Moysey.); Sold in October 1952. Renamed Pen Cw. Currently in storage as John and Mary Meiklam of Gladswood at Gorleston.
670	John and Mary Meiklam of Gladswood	46 ft 6 in (14.17 m)	1923	1939–1952	Relief fleet	Sold in October 1952. Renamed Pen Cw. Currently in storage as John and Mary Meiklam of Gladswood at Gorleston.
691	Mary Scott	46 ft 6 in (14.17 m)	1925	1925–1940	Southwold	(Note: ON (691). 46 ft 6 in (14.17 m) x 12 ft 9 in (3.89 m) lifeboat, legacy of Miss M. Scott, built by J. Samuel White of Cowes, with single 80-hp White DE6 6-cylinder petrol engine, costing £7,827.); Sold in March 1953. Renamed Atanua. Yacht with added cabin at Whitton Hoo boatyard, Rochester as of August 2024.
691	Mary Scott	46 ft 6 in (14.17 m)	1925	1940–1953	Relief fleet	Sold in March 1953. Renamed Atanua. Yacht with added cabin at Whitton Hoo boatyard, Rochester as of August 2024.

== Preserved lifeboats ==
With reference to the above lists, at least eight Norfolk and Suffolk lifeboats still exist, of which three are currently preserved and on display:(December 2025)

- Alfred Corry (ON 353) – Alfred Corry Museum, Southwold
- St Paul (ON 406) – RNLI Heritage Collection, Chatham Historic Dockyard
- James Leith (ON 607) – RNLI Heritage Collection, Chatham Historic Dockyard

== See also ==
- List of RNLI stations
- List of former RNLI stations
- Royal National Lifeboat Institution lifeboats
