= Caister Lifeboat Station =

Lifeboat station in Norfolk, England

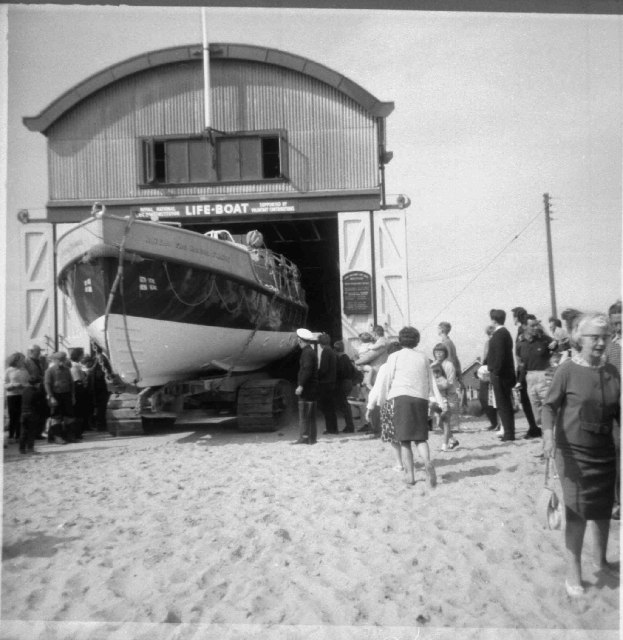
- Caister Lifeboat Station.

- Location within Norfolk

General information
- Type: Lifeboat Station
- Location: Skippers Walk, Caister-on-Sea, Norfolk, NR30 5DJ, England
- Coordinates: 52°38′45.9″N 1°44′09.9″E
- Opened: NASLSM 1845; RNLI 1857; CVLS 1969

Website
- Caister Lifeboat

Caister Lifeboat Station is located in the village and seaside resort of Caister-on-Sea, on the east coast of the county of Norfolk.

A lifeboat was first stationed at Caister by the Norfolk Association for Saving the Lives of Shipwrecked Mariners (NASLSM), more commonly known as the Norfolk Shipwreck Association or (NSA), in 1845. Management of the station was transferred to the Royal National Lifeboat Institution (RNLI) in 1857.

After 112 years, the RNLI decided that with sufficient nearby operational assets, Caister Lifeboat Station was no longer required. The RNLI withdrew in 1969.

The station was immediately re-established as an Independent lifeboat station, and today is operated by the Caister Volunteer Lifeboat Service.

== History ==
In the late 1700s, a group of men, mainly fishermen, formed the "Caister Company of Beachmen", in order to find extra employment offering additional boat services, ferrying passengers and pilots, retrieving discarded anchors to re-sell, and in times of shipwreck, to rescue people, and more importantly, salvage boats and cargo. When lifeboats started being placed along the coast, these would be the men to crew the lifeboat. This company would survive until 1941, when a motor-lifeboat was placed at Caister. During this time, the company would also provide their own boats, and carry out rescues, sometimes in conjunction with the lifeboat.

The first Lifeboat was placed at Caister in 1845, by the Norfolk Association for Saving the Lives of Shipwrecked Mariners (NASLSM) (or Norfolk Shipwreck Association). The boat was transferred from its previous service at Bacton Lifeboat Station in Norfolk, but on arrival, it was found to be in very poor condition. The Caister boatmen refused to use the boat, which was returned to Bacton.

The NSA then provided a new boat, a 42-foot Norfolk and Suffolk-class non-self-righting 'Pulling and Sailing' (P&S) lifeboat, one with oars and sails, built of oak, by Branford of Gt. Yarmouth, which arrived in Caister in 1846. A store and lookout were constructed at the end of Beach Road with the permission of the Lord of the manor, Thomas Clowes. The lookout was the top of a ship's mast, purchased for £3-10s-0d, and standing 60 feet (18 m) tall.

In 1857, management of the Caister lifeboat was transferred to the RNLI, who provided a new lifeboat in 1865. A gift of the Birmingham Lifeboat Fund, the boat was named James Pearce Birmingham No.2. In the following 18 years on service at Caister, the boat would save 484 lives.

The RNLI would provide an additional second lifeboat in 1867, Caister No.2 Lifeboat, a smaller 32-foot lifeboat named Boys (ON 18), thanks to a donation from the Routledge magazine for boys. In 1875, Caister No.2 boat Boys would be renamed Godsend, following a donation by Lady Jane Barbara Bourchier (1810–1884) of Hampton Court Palace. Lady Bourchier had previously funded a boat, also the Godsend, at Chapel Lifeboat Station in Lincolnshire. In 1878, donations from the Covent Garden Lifeboat Funds would be appropriated to the Caister No.1 lifeboat, it being renamed Covent Garden. This would then be the first of three Caister lifeboats to carry that name.

Covent Garden was launched on 25 March 1879 to the aid of the brig Cato, wrecked on Haisborough Sands whilst on passage from Arendal to Calais. All eight crew were rescued. On 6 November 1880, sixteen crew were rescued from the steamship Swan, aground on Haisborough Sands. 10 days later, on 16 March 1880, 17 survivors were rescued from the steamship Ringdove, which had run aground on Cross Sand.

In 1887, a new lifeboat building was built, located approx. 1/4 mile (0.40 km) to the south of Beach road, and known as the "white shed". The shed was used just for equipment storage, with the lifeboats standing on the beach.

Launching just after 04:00 on 8 November 1899, Caister No.2 lifeboat Beauchamp (ON 327) would save the lives of eight men from the lugger Palestine, stranded on Cockle Sand. Setting anchor and veering down, the lifeboat was washed on top of the partly sunken vessel, causing considerable damage to her bow. With waves crashing over both boats, the master and a boy from the vessel had a lucky escape, being pulled from the water, after having jumped and missed the lifeboat. With all eight aboard, the lifeboat moved clear, and then waited until daybreak, at which point the tug Gleaner was signalled, and she towed the lifeboat back to Caister. In her 9-years of service, Beauchamp would be launched 81 times, and save 146 lives.

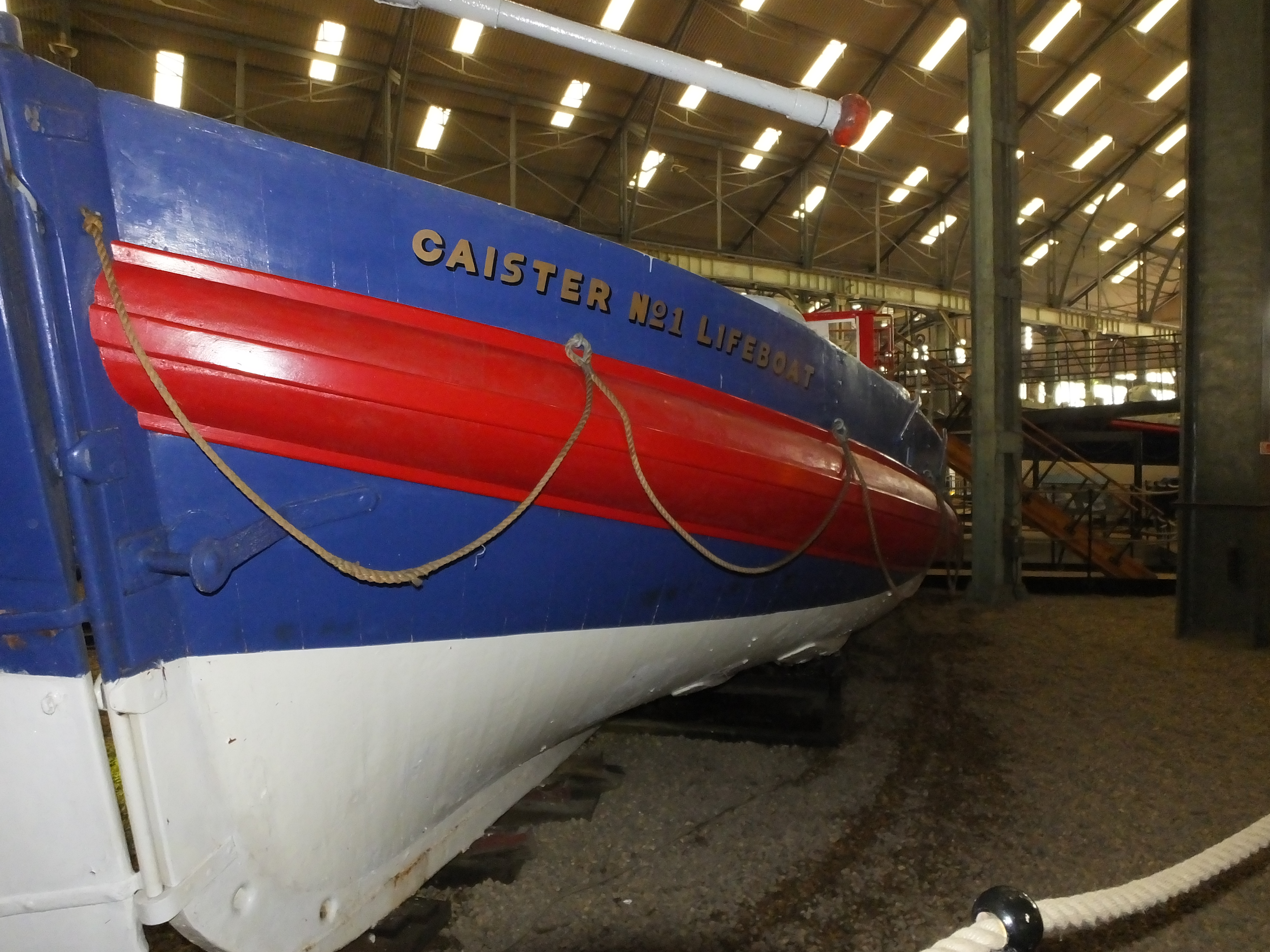
Caister No.1 lifeboat James Leath (ON 607) at Chatham Historic Dockyard

Launched on 29 January 1919 to the aid of the barquentine Nimrod, aground on Barber Sands, Coxswain John Haylett of the Covent Garden (ON 431) was injured, and died some weeks later. Only two crew of the Nimrod survived, making it ashore in the ships boat.

In 1929, the Caister No.1 lifeboat station was closed. James Leath (ON 607) was transferred to Aldeburgh, serving there until 1936. The boat is now preserved as part of the RNLI Heritage Collection at Chatham Historic Dockyard.

It would be 1941 before Caister got their first motor-powered lifeboat, a single-engine Liverpool-class lifeboat. A new boathouse was constructed on the site of the White Shed to house the boat for the first time, and also for the first time, the lifeboat was transported on a carriage, pulled by a Clayton tractor (T12). This boathouse is currently the Caister Lifeboat Heritage Museum.

In 1964, Caister got a new 37-foot 8-knot Oakley-class lifeboat, 37-11 The Royal Thames (ON 978), the first self-righting lifeboat to be placed at Caister. Her time at Caister, however, was short-lived. A coastal review by the RNLI in the late 1960s deemed that there was sufficient local lifeboat cover, with a faster 16-knot Waveney-class lifeboat now at Great Yarmouth and Gorleston, just 6 miles (9.7 km) to the south. In 1969, after 112 years, the RNLI withdrew from Caister Lifeboat Station.

Caister held the record for the most lives saved by any lifeboat station in the British Isles, and there was a public outcry at the closure. Caister Volunteer Rescue Service (CVRS) was formed, and took over on the same day as the RNLI withdrew.

The service still operates today, as Caister Volunteer Lifeboat Service, and further details can be found at:

- Caister Volunteer Lifeboat Service

== "Caister men never turn back" ==
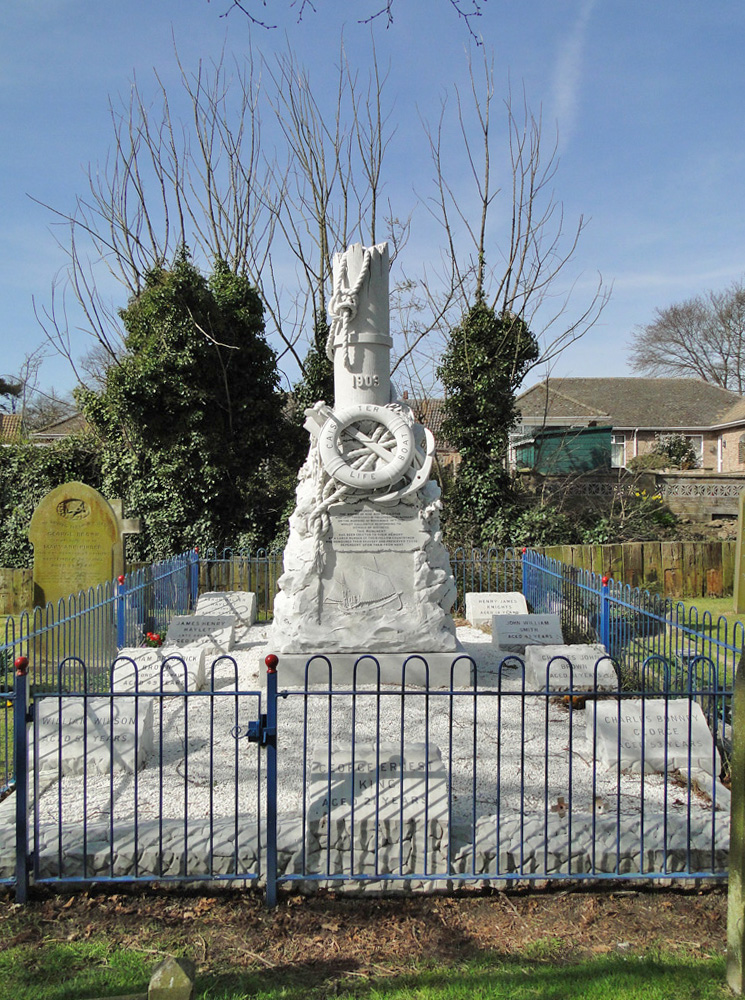
Caister Lifeboat Memorial

Just after 23:00 on 13 November 1901, Cockle light-ship fired a signal, indicating a ship in distress on Barber Sands. First attempts to launch the lifeboat Beauchamp failed, the boat being washed off the skids, and it wasn't until 02:00 that the boat was finally launched. Most of the launchers headed home for dry clothing, but 78-year-old James Haylett Snr, former Asst.Coxswain stayed on watch, having two sons, two grandsons, and a son-in-law on board. Not long after, cries for help were heard. The 5-ton Beauchamp had capsized on the shore, trapping the crew underneath. James Haylett Snr, along with Frederick Haylett, was instrumental in the rescue of the three survivors, Charles Knights, John Hubbard, and James' grandson Walter Haylett. Without food or dry clothing, he remained with the boat until it was finally righted at 11:30, and the last of the bodies recovered.

At the subsequent inquest of the 1901 Caister lifeboat disaster, when questioned if the lifeboat had abandoned its mission, James replied "They would never give up the ship. If they had to keep at it 'til now, they would have sailed about until daylight to help her. Going back is against the rules when we see distress signals like that." In the press, it was reported that he said "Caister Men Never Turn Back".

A memorial was erected in Caister cemetery, and a new stained glass window in the parish church was dedicated to the disaster. At a ceremony at Sandringham House on 6 January 1902, King Edward VII, Patron of the RNLI, and George Prince of Wales, and RNLI president, presented James Haylett Snr., Launcher and former Asst. Coxswain, with the RNLI Gold Medal.

== Station honours ==
The following are awards made at Caister.

- RNLI Gold Medal
  James Haylett Snr, Launcher, formerly Asst, Coxswain - 1901
- RNIPLS Silver Medal
  Lt. Henry Baillie, RN, H.M. Coastguard – 1828
  Lt. Sydenham Wylde, RN, H.M. Coastguard – 1838
- RNLI Silver Medal
  Philip George, Coxswain – 1875
  S. Bishop, Chief Boatman, H.M. Coastguard – 1875
  Philip George, Coxswain – 1887 (Second-Service clasp)
  James Henry Haylett Jnr., Coxswain – 1893
  James Henry Haylett Jnr., Coxswain – 1900 (Second-Service clasp)
  John Haylett, Coxswain Superintendent – 1906
  John Plummer, Asst. Coxswain – 1906
  Solomon Brown, crew member – 1906
  Walter Haylett, crew member – 1906
  (All from Caister No.2 Lifeboat)
- RNLI Bronze Medal
  John Robert Plummer, Coxswain – 1964
- The Thanks of the Institution inscribed on Vellum
  Frederick H. Haylett – 1901
- British Empire Medal
  John Robert Plummer, Coxswain – 1969QBH

== Roll of honour ==
In memory of those lost whilst serving Caister lifeboat.

- Lifeboat Beauchamp (ON 327) capsized on service on 13 November 1901
  Aaron Walter Haylett, Coxswain (49)
  William Frederick Brown, Second Coxswain (49)
  Charles John Brown (31)
  Charles Bonney George (53)
  James Henry Haylett Jnr. (56)
  George Ernest King (21)
  Harry James Haylett Knights (18)
  John William Smith (43)
  William Russell Wilson (56)
- On service to the barquentine Nimrod on 29/30 January 1919
  John S. Haylett, Coxswain (54), died of injuries received, 11 March 1919.

== Caister lifeboats ==
=== NSA ===
ON (Note: ON is the RNLI's Official Number of the boat.)	Name	Built	On station	Class	Comments
Pre-083	Unnamed	1822	1845–1846	29-foot 6in North Country	(Note: 29-foot 6in x 11-foot 6in (12-oared) North Country non-self-righting lifeboat.); Previously at Bacton.
Pre-218	Unnamed	1846	1846−1865	42-foot Norfolk and Suffolk (P&S)	(Note: 42-foot x 11-foot 6in (14/16 oared) Norfolk and Suffolk non-self-righting (P&S) lifeboat, built by Branford of Great Yarmouth, costing £250.)

Pre ON numbers are unofficial numbers used by the Lifeboat Enthusiasts' Society to reference early lifeboats not included on the official RNLI list.

=== RNLI ===
==== Caister No.1 Station ====
ON	Name	Built	On station	Class	Comments
Pre-427	James Pearce Birmingham No.2	1865	1865–1878	42-foot Norfolk and Suffolk (P&S)	(Note: 42-foot x 11-foot 10in (14-oared) Norfolk and Suffolk non-self-righting (P&S) lifeboat, gift of Birmingham LB fund, built by Blake and Mills of Great Yarmouth, costing £238.); Renamed Covent Garden in 1878.
Pre-427	Covent Garden	1865	1878–1883	42-foot Norfolk and Suffolk (P&S)	(Note: gift of the Covent Garden LB fund.)
17	Covent Garden	1882	1883–1899	42-foot 4in Norfolk and Suffolk (P&S)	(Note: 42-foot 4in x 11-foot 6in (14-oared) Norfolk and Suffolk non-self-righting (P&S) lifeboat, gift of the Covent Garden LB fund, built by James Beeching of Great Yarmouth, costing £300.)
431	Covent Garden	1899	1899–1919	40-foot Norfolk and Suffolk (P&S)	(Note: 40-foot x 12-foot (12-oared) Norfolk and Suffolk non-self-righting (P&S) lifeboat, gift of the Covent Garden LB fund, built by Thames Ironworks, of Blackwall, London, costing £1295.)
607	James Leath	1910	1919–1929	42-foot Norfolk and Suffolk (P&S)	(Note: 42-foot x 12-foot 6in (12-oared) Norfolk and Suffolk non-self-righting (P&S) lifeboat, built by Thames Ironworks, of Blackwall, London, costing £1934.); Previously at Pakefield

Station Closed, 1929

==== Caister No.2 Pulling and Sailing (P&S) lifeboats ====
ON	Name	Built	On station	Class	Comments
18	Boys	1867	1867−1875	32-foot 6in Norfolk and Suffolk (P&S)	(Note: 32-foot 6in x 10-foot (12-oared) Norfolk and Suffolk non-self-righting (P&S) lifeboat, gift of Routledge Magazine for Boys, built by James Beeching of Great Yarmouth, costing £153.); Renamed God Send in 1875.
18	God Send	1867	1875–1892	32-foot 6in Norfolk and Suffolk non-self-righting (P&S)	(Note: Gift of Lady Bouchire of Hampton Court Palace.)
327	Beauchamp	1892	1892−1901	36-foot Norfolk and Suffolk (P&S)	(Note: 36-foot x 10-foot 6in (12-oared) Norfolk and Suffolk non-self-righting (P&S) lifeboat, gift of Sir R. Proctor-Beauchamp, Bt., built by J. H. Critten of Great Yarmouth, costing £266.)
506	Nancy Lucy	1903	1903−1929	35-foot Norfolk and Suffolk (P&S)	(Note: 35-foot x 10-foot 9in (12-oared) Norfolk and Suffolk non-self-righting (P&S) lifeboat, gift of Sir H. W. Lucy, JP MP of London, built by Thames Ironworks, of Blackwall, London, costing £1,603.)
526	Charles Burton	1904	1929–1941	38-foot Liverpool (P&S)	(Note: 38-foot x 10-foot 9in (14-oared) Liverpool-class non-self-righting (P&S) lifeboat, legacy of Mr C. T. H. Burton, built by Thames Ironworks, of Blackwall, London, costing £1,044.); Previously at Grimsby.

==== Caister No.2 Motor lifeboats ====
ON	Op. No. (Note: Op. No. is the RNLI's Operational Number of the boat carried on the hull.)	Name	Built	On station	Class	Comments
834	–	Jose Neville	1941	1941–1964	Liverpool	
978	37-11	The Royal Thames	1964	1964−1969	Oakley	

Station Closed, 1969

==== Launch and recovery tractors ====
Op. No.	Reg. No.	Type	On station	Comments
T12	IJ 5658	Clayton	1941–1944	
T16	YW 3377	Clayton	1944–1949	
T48	KGP 853	Case LA	1949–1959	
T47	KGP 2	Case LA	1959–1963	
T72	518 GYM	Case 1000D	1963–1965	
T76	BGO 680B	Case 1000D	1965–1969	

== See also ==
- Independent lifeboats in Britain and Ireland
- List of RNLI stations
- List of former RNLI stations
- Royal National Lifeboat Institution lifeboats
