= Corton Lifeboat Station =

Former RNLI lifeboat station in Suffolk, England

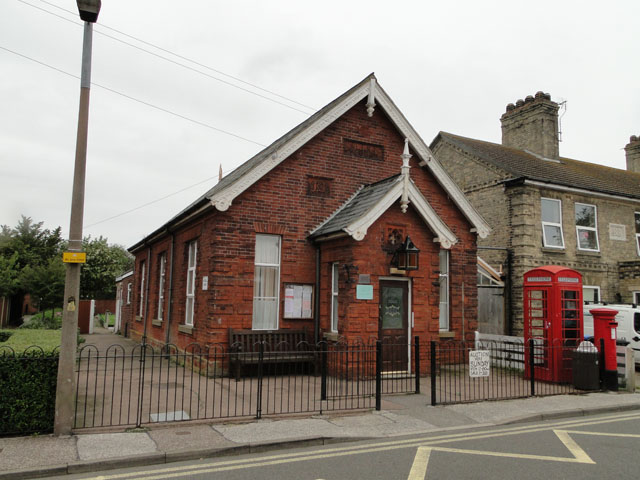
- Corton Village Room

- Corton, Suffolk

General information
- Status: Closed
- Type: RNLI lifeboat station
- Location: Corton, Suffolk, NR32 5, England
- Coordinates: 52°30′53.1″N 1°44′50.3″E
- Opened: 20 October 1869
- Closed: 1879

Corton Lifeboat Station was located in Corton, Suffolk, a small village approximately 2.5 miles (4.0 km) north of Lowestoft, on the Suffolk coast. The exact location is not known.

A lifeboat station was first established at Corton in 1869 by the Royal National Lifeboat Institution (RNLI).

Just one lifeboat served at Corton. After just 10 years of operation, Corton Lifeboat Station was closed in 1879.

== History ==
At a meeting of the RNLI committee of management on Thursday 8 April 1868, following application by local residents, and the visit and report by Capt. John R. Ward, Inspector of Lifeboats, it was decided to establish a lifeboat station at Corton, Suffolk,"it being considered that such a boat would be of service in that place, as there is an open passage through the Corton Sand Bank immediately opposite the village, and numerous vessels get ashore there, and often break up very quickly after doing so, before, perhaps, the Lowestoft life-boats could get to the assistance of the unfortunate crews."

A boathouse was constructed at a cost £226-18s, the site being granted by Capt. Fowler, a member of the local lifeboat committee. Along with its transporting carriage, a 36-foot x 10-foot 6in Norfolk and Suffolk class non-self-righting 'Pulling and Sailing' (P&S) lifeboat, one with sails and (14) oars, double-banked, costing £180, was supplied to the station, in accordance with the preference of the local boatmen, who formed the crew.

The whole cost of the lifeboat, carriage, boathouse and equipment was defrayed from the gift of £620 from Mrs Davis of Clapham Rise, Clapham in memory of her husband George, in addition to an annual subscription of £10 for maintenance.

The lifeboat was transported to Corton on 19 October 1869, and was formally presented to the Institution by Mrs Davis on Wednesday 20 October. Mrs Davis then named the boat Husband (ON 16), stating that it was in memory "of one of the best of husbands and kindest of men, and that she trusted that God's blessing would rest on the boat and all connected with the National Life-boat Institution."

On 12 October 1870, both Lowestoft and Corton lifeboats were launched to the aid of the smack Olive, whilst on passage from the Faroe Islands to Harwich. There were 12 crew aboard the Olive, along with three fishermen, who had already been rescued before the vessel had run aground on Corton Sand, and would end up being rescued twice. The Lowestoft lifeboat was first to arrive in just 30 minutes, having been towed part of the way, and took off the first 12 men. The Corton lifeboat then arrived, and rescued the remaining three, shortly before the vessel was a complete wreck.

No further service of the Corton lifeboat can be found. Plenty of rescues took place around Corton Sand, but every time, it was either the Lowestoft or Great Yarmouth and Gorleston lifeboat in attendance. In 1879, just 10 years after the station was established, Corton Lifeboat Station was closed.

The location of the station building cannot be determined, but it is possible that the site or even part of the building was used for the construction of the Corton Village Room in 1890. The lifeboat on station at the time of closure, Husband (ON 16), the only lifeboat to have served at Corton, was transferred to Winterton No.2 Lifeboat Station, serving there until 1890.

== Corton lifeboat ==
ON (Note: ON is the RNLI's Official Number of the boat.)	Name	Built	On station	Class	Comments
16	Husband	1869	1869−1879	36-foot Norfolk and Suffolk (P&S)	(Note: 36-foot x 10-foot 6in (14-oared) Norfolk and Suffolk-class non-self-righting (P&S) lifeboat, gift of Mrs Geo. Davis of Clapham, built by James Beeching of Great Yarmouth, costing £180.)

Pre ON numbers are unofficial numbers used by the Lifeboat Enthusiast Society to reference early lifeboats not included on the official RNLI list.

== See also ==
- List of RNLI stations
- List of former RNLI stations
- Independent lifeboats in Britain and Ireland
