= Southwold Lifeboat Station =

RNLI lifeboat station in Suffolk, England

- Southwold Lifeboat Station in 2025

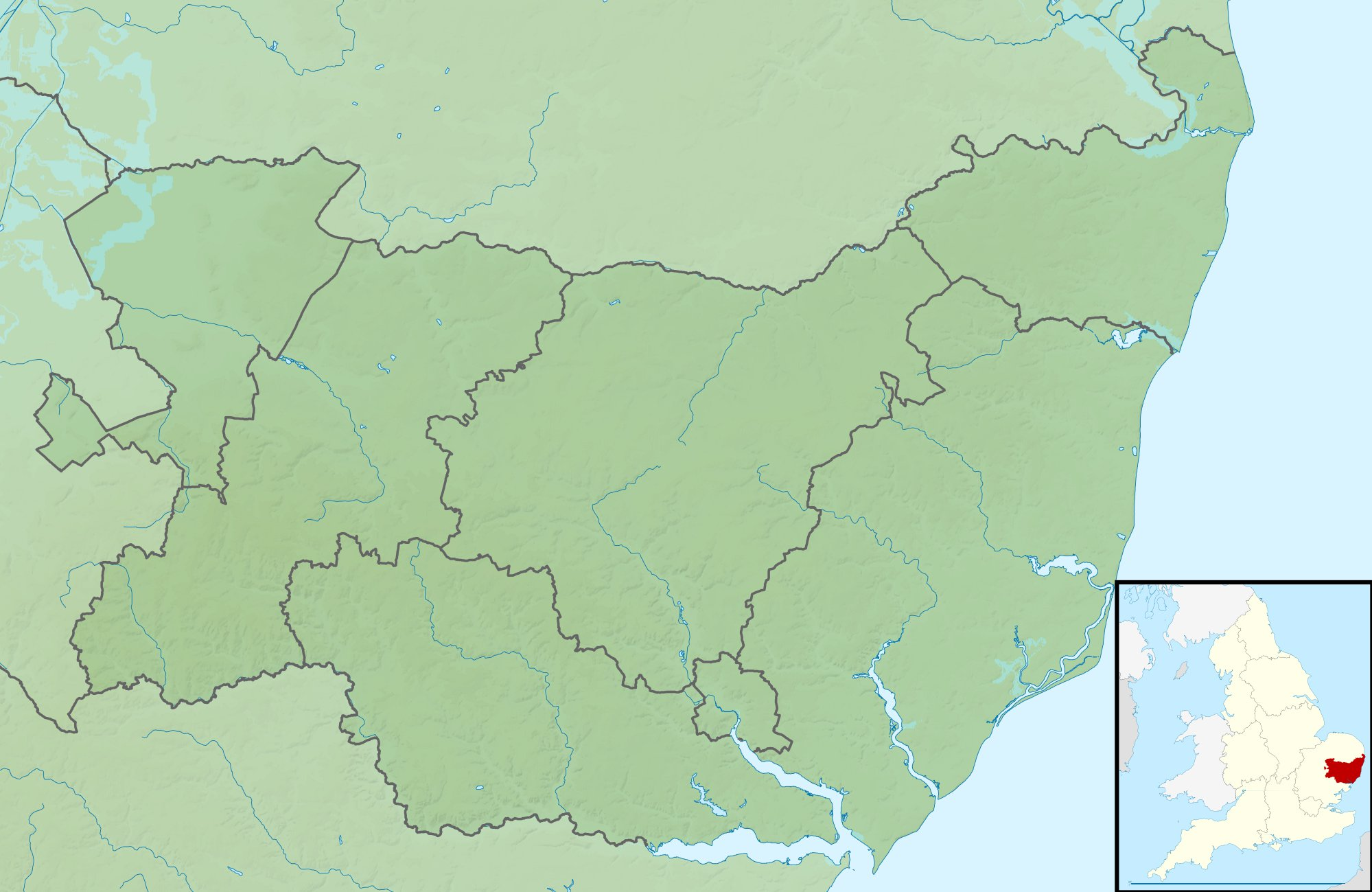
- Location within Suffolk

General information
- Type: RNLI Lifeboat Station
- Location: Ferry Road,, Southwold, Suffolk, IP18 6NB, England
- Coordinates: 52°18′54″N 1°40′21″E
- Opened: 1841–1940; 1963–present
- Owner: Royal National Lifeboat Institution

Website
- Southwold RNLI Lifeboat Station

Southwold Lifeboat Station is located at the end of Ferry Road at Southwold Harbour, on the north bank of the River Blyth, in the county of Suffolk, England.

A lifeboat was first stationed at Southwold by the Southwold Lifeboat Society in 1841. Management of the station was transferred to the Royal National Lifeboat Institution (RNLI) in 1854, the station in operation until its closure in 1940. The RNLI re-opened Southwold as an Inshore lifeboat station in 1963.

The station currently operates an B-class (Atlantic 85) Inshore lifeboat, Annie Tranmer (B-868), on station since 2013.

== History ==
In view of the number of wrecks occurring on the Barnard Sand, and between Walberswick and Dunwich, with no assistance available from the Lowestoft or Pakefield lifeboats, a meeting was convened at Southwold Town Hall on 18 December 1840, to discuss the means to provide a lifeboat at Southwold. The Southwold Lifeboat Society was established, with Jas. Jermyn appointed secretary. Soon, the sum of £385-7s-2d was raised, and an order placed with Teasdell of Great Yarmouth. A 40-foot (12 m) 'Pulling and Sailing' (P&S) lifeboat, one with sails and (12) oars, arrived in Southwold in 1841, and was named Solebay.

At 04:00 on 4 December 1848, the schooner Ury of Sunderland on passage to Dunkirk with a cargo of coal, ran aground on the Barnard Sands and was de-masted. The Captain and two crew were lost. Men from Kessingland were unable to launch their yawl, and a messenger was sent on horseback to Southwold. The lifeboat arrived after 30 minutes, and veering down, rescued one man. A second man refused to release his grip on the rigging, and so at great risk to himself, acting Coxswain John Fish ran up the broken mast, bringing the man to safety. Lloyd's of London committee rewarded the lifeboat crew with £19-10s, including £5 for John Fish, who was also awarded the RNLI Silver Medal.

During the rescue to the William Cook of Great Yarmouth, which had struck the Outer Shoal on 11 January 1852 whilst on passage to Ramsgate from Hartlepool, the Solebay was badly damaged. A new 38-foot (12 m) self-righting lifeboat was ordered from James Beeching, arriving in 1852, and named Harriett. However, as time went by, the crew expressed increasing dissatisfaction with the new boat, indicating that they would prefer to use the old one, even in its declined state.

With this dilemma, and with depleted funds, the Southwold Lifeboat Committee approached the RNLI for advice. At a meeting of the RNLI committee of management on 5 January 1854, it was agreed to take over the assets and liabilities of the station, and contribute £200 towards a new lifeboat, on the agreement that the local committee would order a boat, and find the remaining funds. A new 40-foot (12 m) Norfolk and Suffolk-class lifeboat arrived in 1855, again taking the name Harriett (ON 28).

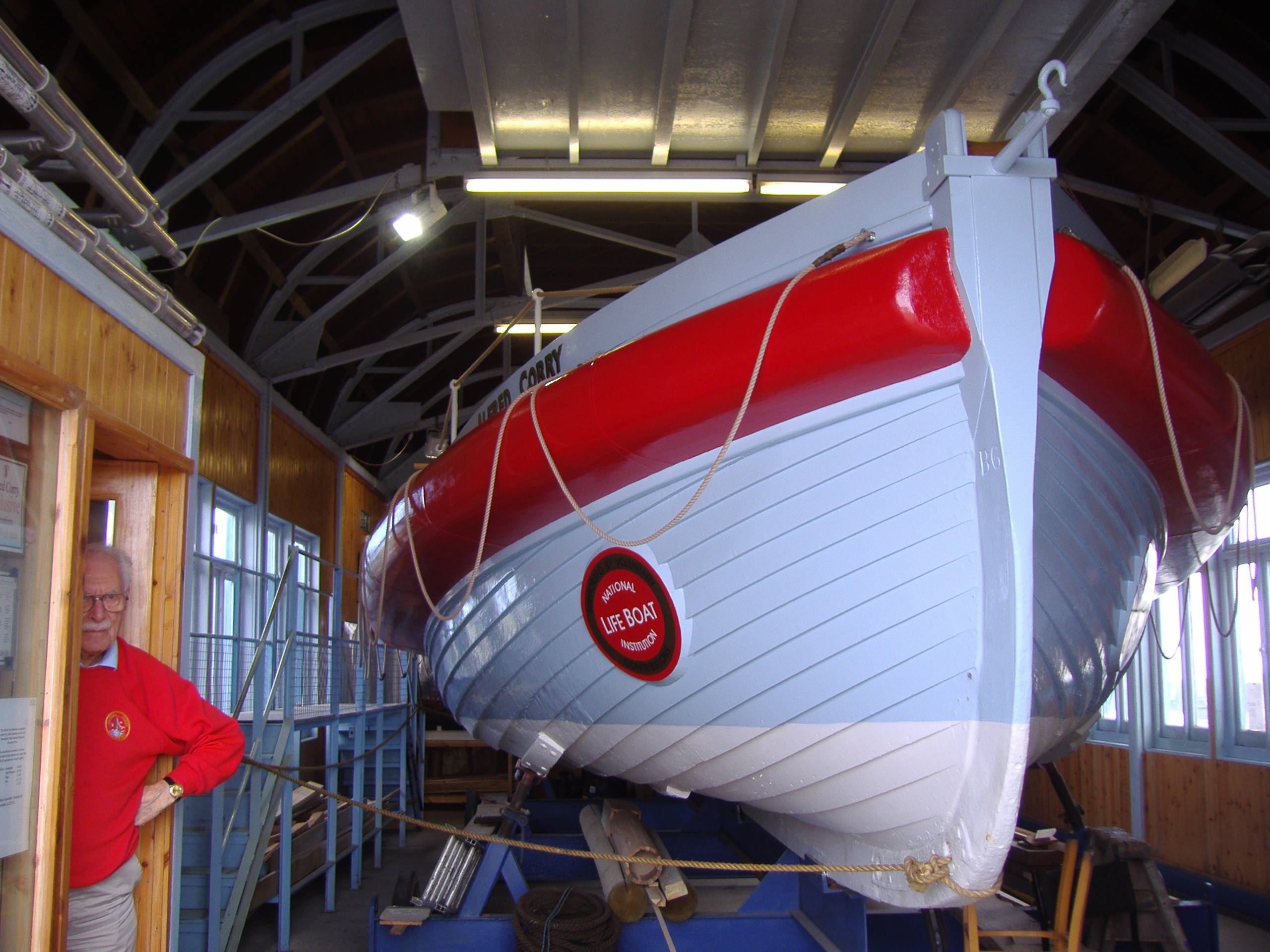
Southwold lifeboat Alfred Corry (ON 353), now on display at the nearby museum

On 27 February 1858, the lifeboat set out for exercise, with three observers aboard. In heavy surf, with all sails set, the lifeboat was pitched on its side. The masts broke when they hit the ground, and the boat fully capsized, throwing everyone into the water. All the lifeboat crew were recovered, but all three observers drowned. They were the only ones not wearing life-belts. One observer, Rev. Hodges, was found later under the upturned boat, tangled in the gear.

A No.2 station was established in August 1866, with the arrival of a smaller 33-foot (10 m) Peake-class self-righting lifeboat, giving the option of using a larger or smaller boat dependent on conditions. The lifeboat, with its carriage, was first transported to Halesworth free of charge, by the Great Eastern railway company. From there, it was drawn on its carriage to Southwold, and paraded through the streets to the lifeboat station, where it was named Quiver No. 2, before being launched on demonstration to the assembled crowd. The lifeboat was one of three boats funded by the readers of The Quiver magazine.

== 1920s onwards ==
The inauguration of a new 46-foot-6-inch (14.17 m) Norfolk and Suffolk-class motor-powered lifeboat took place at Southwold on 11 July 1926. The lifeboat was funded from the legacy of Miss Mary Scott, a lifelong supporter. During her time at Southwold, the Mary Scott (ON 691) would be launched 30 times, and save 23 lives.

At 13:15 on 30 May 1940, RNLI headquarters in London received an urgent telephone-call from the Minister of Shipping, to muster as many lifeboats at possible at Dover within 24 hours. In all, 19 lifeboats attended Dover, including the Mary Scott from Southwold, for what would be the Dunkirk evacuation. With a crew supplied by the Royal Navy, Mary Scott was towed to Dunkirk by the paddle steamer Emperor of India, together with two other small boats. Between them, they took 160 men to their mother ship, then made a journey with 50 men to another transport vessel. When her engine broke down, Mary Scott was beached and abandoned at De Panne, east of Dunkirk, although she was later recovered, and returned to service with the RNLI.

However, as part of the Second World War defences, in preparation for invasion, a boom of floats and chains was installed across the Southwold harbour entrance. No boats could come in or go out, and Southwold Lifeboat Station was forced to close. It didn't reopen after the war. The Mary Scott was assigned to the relief fleet, operating until she was withdrawn from service in 1953.

== 1960s onwards ==
In 1963, in response to an increasing amount of water-based leisure activity, the RNLI began trials of small fast Inshore lifeboats, placed at various locations around the country. These were easily launched with just a few people, ideal to respond quickly to local emergencies. This quickly proved to be very successful.

One of the first places chosen for a new Inshore lifeboats was Southwold. The Southwold lifeboat station was re-established in July 1963, with the arrival of a D-class (RFD PB16) Inshore lifeboat, the unnamed (D-6). At the time, Inshore lifeboats were placed on station just for the summer season, and many boats were moved around to different stations. Southwold is recorded as having five different D-class Inshore lifeboats between 1963 and 1973.

== Present day ==
The current boathouse was built in 1993 near the entrance to Southwold Harbour at the mouth of the River Blyth. A winch and davit are used to launch the boat. These were repositioned in 2012 following essential repair work carried out to the harbour wall.

The station covers an area of approximately 25 miles (40 km). Neighbouring lifeboat stations are located at Lowestoft and Aldeburgh along the North Sea coast. The Atlantic 85 is the third generation Rigid Inflatable Boat (RIB) in the B-class series. The lifeboat has a manually operated self-righting mechanism and can be beached in an emergency without sustaining damage to engines or steering gear. She is ideal for rescues close to shore and on the sandbanks along the coast at Southwold.

The lifeboat is operated by a crew of around 18 volunteers. Charity abseil events in 2009 and 2011 at Southwold lighthouse raised over £20,000 for the lifeboat.

== Station honours ==
The following are awards made at Southwold:

- RNIPLS Silver Medal
  John Fish, Acting Coxswain – 1849
- RNLI Silver Medal
  Benjamin Herrington, Coxswain – 1854
  William Waters, Second Coxswain – 1854
  John Cragie, Acting Coxswain – 1859
  Benjamin Herrington, Second Coxswain – 1859 (Second-Service clasp)
  Edward William Goldsmith, Bricklayer – 1895
  Thomas Henry Palmer, Fisherman – 1895
  Alfred Took, Fisherman – 1895
  John Cragie, Coxswain – 1895 (Second-Service clasp)
  John Cragie, Coxswain – 1898 (Third-Service clasp)
- Silver Medals and Diplomas, awarded by The President of France
  E. R. Cooper, Honorary Secretary – 1905
  S. May, Coxswain – 1905
  C. Jarvis, Second Coxswain – 1905
- RNLI Bronze Medal
  James H. Gilings, Decorator – 1924
  Frank Upcraft, Coxswain – 1927
  Patrick Pile, crew member – 1972
  Martin Helmer, crew member – 1972
  Roger Edward Trigg, Helm – 1981
- Bronze Medals and Diplomas, awarded by The President of France
  the 16 other members of the crew – 1905
- Medals and Certificates, awarded by The Queen of the Netherlands
  The lifeboat crew – 1912
- The Walter and Elizabeth Groombridge Award 1990
  (for the outstanding inshore lifeboat rescue of the previous year)
  Jonathan Adnams, Helm – 1990
  Paul Horsnell, crew member – 1990
- 'The Thanks of the Institution inscribed on Vellum'
  S. May, Coxswain – 1911
  J. P. A. Adnams, crewman – 1981
  A. Chambers, skipper of the motor fishing vessel Broadside – 1981
  J. P. A. Adnams, Helm – 1989
- 'A Framed Letter of Thanks signed by the Chairman of the Institution'
  Roger Trigg, Helm – 1983
  J. P. A. Adnams, Helm – 1990
- Officer, Order of the British Empire (OBE)
  Jonathan Patrick Adair Adnams, DLA – 2009NYH

== Roll of honour ==
In memory of those lost whilst serving at Southwold:

- Lost when the lifeboat Harriett (ON 28) capsized on exercise, 27 February 1858
  George Ellis, observer
  Rev. Robert Hodges, observer
  John Ord, observer

== Southwold lifeboats ==
=== Southwold Lifeboat Society ===
| ON (Note: ON is the RNLI's Official Number of the boat.) | Name | Built | On station | Class | Comments |
|---|---|---|---|---|---|
| – | Solebay | 1841 | 1841–1855 | 40-foot Norfolk and Suffolk | Transferred to Kessingland. |
| Pre-246 | Harriett | 1852 | 1852–1855 | 38-foot Beeching self-righting (P&S) | (Note: 38 ft 0 in (11.58 m) x 10 ft 0 in (3.05 m) (12-oared) Beeching self-righting (P&S) lifeboat, provided by The Shipwrecked Fishermen and Mariners' Royal Benevolent Society (SFMRBS), the gift of Miss Sheriffe and Sir Edward Gooch, built by James Beeching of Great Yarmouth, costing £280.); Transferred to Gt. Yarmouth. |

Pre ON numbers are unofficial numbers used by the Lifeboat Enthusiasts' Society to reference early lifeboats not included on the official RNLI list.

=== No.1 station ===
| ON | Name | Built | On station | Class | Comments |
|---|---|---|---|---|---|
| 28 | Harriett | 1855 | 1855–1869 | 40-foot Norfolk and Suffolk | Renamed London Coal Exchange in 1869. |
| 28 | London Coal Exchange | 1855 | 1869–1893 | 40-foot Norfolk and Suffolk | Sold in 1893. |
| 353 | Alfred Corry | 1893 | 1893–1918 | 44-foot Norfolk and Suffolk | Now on display in the old Cromer lifeboat house, at Southwold. |
| 352 | Bolton | 1893 | 1918–1925 | 43-foot Norfolk and Suffolk | Previously at Kessingland and Aldeburgh. |
| 691 | Mary Scott | 1925 | 1925–1940 | 46-foot 6in Norfolk and Suffolk (Motor) | One of the Little Ships of Dunkirk; Never returned to Southwold. Transferred to the Relief fleet. |

Station closed 1940 due to World War 2 requirements.
More post-service details can be found on the respective lifeboat class pages.

=== No.2 station ===
| ON | Name | Built | On station | Class | Comments |
|---|---|---|---|---|---|
| Pre-454 | Quiver No. 2 | 1866 | 1866–1882 | 33-foot Peake self-righting (P&S) | (Note: 33 ft 0 in (10.06 m) x 8 ft 0 in (2.44 m) (10-oared) Peake-class self-righting (P&S) lifeboat, gift of The Quiver magazine LB fund, built by Forrestt of Limehouse, London, costing £293.); Returned to London in 1882. |
| 29 | Quiver No. 2 | 1871 | 1882–1897 | 30-foot Norfolk and Suffolk-class 'Surf-Boat' | Previously Dorinda and Barbara at Theddlethorpe. Used for demonstration purposes until 1917. |
| 405 | Rescue | 1897 | 1897–1920 | 32-foot Norfolk and Suffolk-class 'Surf-Boat' | |

Station closed, 1920
More post-service details can be found on the respective lifeboat class pages.

=== Inshore lifeboats ===
==== D class ====
| Op.No. (Note: Op.No. is the RNLI's Operational Number of the boat carried on the hull.) | Name | On station | Class | Comments |
|---|---|---|---|---|
| D-6 | Unnamed | 1963 | D-class (RFD PB16) | |
| D-25 | Unnamed | 1964 | D-class (RFD PB16) | |
| D-14 | Unnamed | 1965 | D-class (RFD PB16) | |
| D-36 | Unnamed | 1965–1970 | D-class (RFD PB16) | |
| D-191 | Unnamed | 1970–1973 | D-class (RFD PB16) | |

==== B class ====
| Op.No. | Name | On station | Class | Comments |
|---|---|---|---|---|
| B-518 | Sole Bay | 1973–1985 | B-class (Atlantic 21) | |
| B-562 | The Quiver | 1985–1998 | B-class (Atlantic 21) | |
| B-750 | Leslie Tranmer | 1998–2013 | B-class (Atlantic 75) | |
| B-868 | Annie Tranmer | 2013– | B-class (Atlantic 85) | |

== See also ==
- List of RNLI stations
- List of former RNLI stations
- Royal National Lifeboat Institution lifeboats

== Sources ==
- Leonard, Richie; Denton, Tony (2025). Lifeboat Enthusiasts Handbook 2025. Lifeboats Enthusiasts' Society.
- Leonard, Richie; Denton, Tony (2026). Lifeboat Enthusiasts Handbook 2026. Lifeboats Enthusiasts' Society.
- Farr, Grahame; Morris, Jeff (1992). List of British Lifeboats Part 1 & 2 (Second ed.). Lifeboat Enthusiasts' Society.
