= Pakefield Lifeboat Station =

Former lifeboat station in Suffolk, England

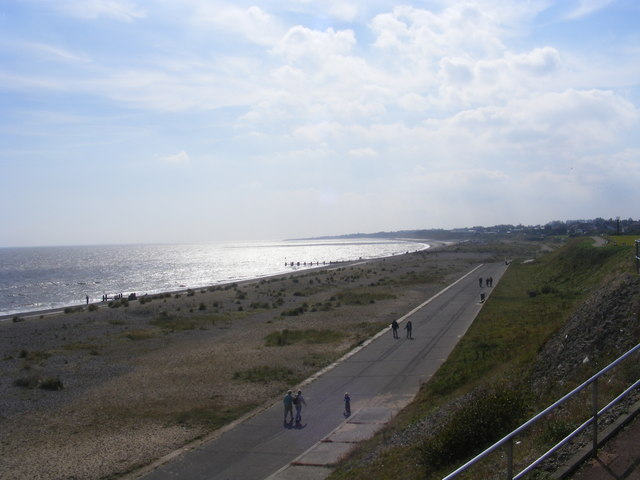
- Pakefield Beach.

- Location within Suffolk

General information
- Status: Closed
- Type: RNLI Lifeboat Station
- Location: Cliftonville Road, Pakefield, Suffolk, England
- Coordinates: 52°27′01.5″N 1°44′03.2″E
- Opened: 1840 SHS; 1855 RNLI
- Closed: 1922

Pakefield Lifeboat Station was located at various sites in Pakefield, a suburb of Lowestoft, on the Suffolk coast.

A lifeboat was first placed at Pakefield by the Suffolk Humane Society (SHS) in 1840. Management of the station was transferred to the Royal National Lifeboat Institution (RNLI) in 1855.

After 82 years of operation, Pakefield Lifeboat Station closed in 1922.

== History ==
A lifeboat station was first established at Pakefield in 1840, and along with a lifeboat at Lowestoft, was operated by the Suffolk Humane Society. A 45-foot Norfolk and Suffolk-class lifeboat was placed on station, constructed by Teasdel of Great Yarmouth.

On the evening of 7 October 1854, the brig Dronningen grounded on Holm Sand off Lowestoft, whilst on passage from Drøbak to London. In difficult conditions, a crew of 19, led by coastguard Lt. Richard Joachim, RN, were towed in the Pakefield lifeboat to the scene by the Lowestoft tugboat, finally getting alongside, only to find the eight crew intoxicated, and unwilling to leave the vessel. The lifeboat returned to Lowestoft, and succeeded in rescuing the crew the following day. For this service, Lt. Joachim was awarded the RNLI Silver Medal.

At the Annual General Meeting of the RNLI on 26 April 1855, it was announced that the Suffolk Humane Society, now with three stations at Lowestoft, Southwold and Pakefield, had voluntarily joined the Institution.

Whilst the Southwold lifeboat was immediately replaced in 1855, it is assumed that the Pakefield lifeboat was in good condition, as it was retained, and served Pakefield for a further 17 years. In 1868, the Institution received a gift of £420 from the Misses Sarah and Lydia Harris. The money was appropriated to the Pakefield station, and the lifeboat was duly renamed Sisters.

At 11:00 on the 7 October 1858, the barque Zemira of Leghorn (Livorno) ran aground on Newcome Sands in gale-force conditions, whilst on passage from Newcastle upon Tyne. Launching as soon as possible, the lifeboat arrived on scene after 40 minutes, to find the vessel broken up. Continuing the search in poor conditions, they managed to rescue eight of the 13 crew, all clinging to debris and wreckage. The last man was found 2 miles (3.2 km) from the wreck. For this service, the Coxswain and Crew were all awarded the Board of Trade Medal for Gallantry at Sea.

In 1871, an additional and smaller 30-foot lifeboat and transporting carriage was placed at Pakefield, designed for close shore work, and supplied at the request of the local beachmen. A No. 2 lifeboat house was constructed, at a cost of £50. At a ceremony on 18 January 1871, at the request of benefactor John Legrew, the lifeboat was named Henry Burford, RN.

In 1872, after 32-years service, the 46-foot lifeboat, originally provided by the SHS, was declared unfit. Since 1855, when the RNLI took over, the boat and crew had saved 88 lives, and also saved five vessels from destruction. It was replaced with a lifeboat to the same design, again 46-feet long, and retained the name Sisters (ON 23). In 1876, the lifeboat was renamed The Two Sisters, Mary and Hannah, in accordance with the wishes of the late Mr Thomas Parkin, of Wigton, following his bequest of £550.

Coxswain George Warford was awarded the RNLI Silver Medal in 1886, in recognition of his long and valuable services in the lifeboat.
Services include:

- Brig Amicizia of Genoa, 23 May 1868, saved four.
- Brigantine Douglas of Guernsey, 8 April 1869, saved seven and the vessel.
- Schooner Jams Cuckow of Ipswich, 6 March 1870, saved seven.
- Barque Nimrod of Liverpool, 18 November 1882, saved 18.

Also in 1886, the No.1 lifeboat The Two Sisters, Mary and Hannah (ON 23) was loaned to Lowestoft, to be their No.2 Lifeboat. No relief boat was provided, leaving just the No.2 lifeboat on station at Pakefield. The lifeboat was at Lowestoft for four years, returning in 1890. That same year, a new boathouse was constructed on Cliftonville Road.

The No.2 lifeboat Henry Burford, RN (ON 24) was withdrawn in 1895, and the No.2 station closed.

Coxswain George Warford was awarded a bar (clasp) to his RNLI Silver Medal on his resignation in 1898, and for further rescues, including:

- Brigantine Kelpie, 9 January 1895, Saved seven, and vessel recovered.

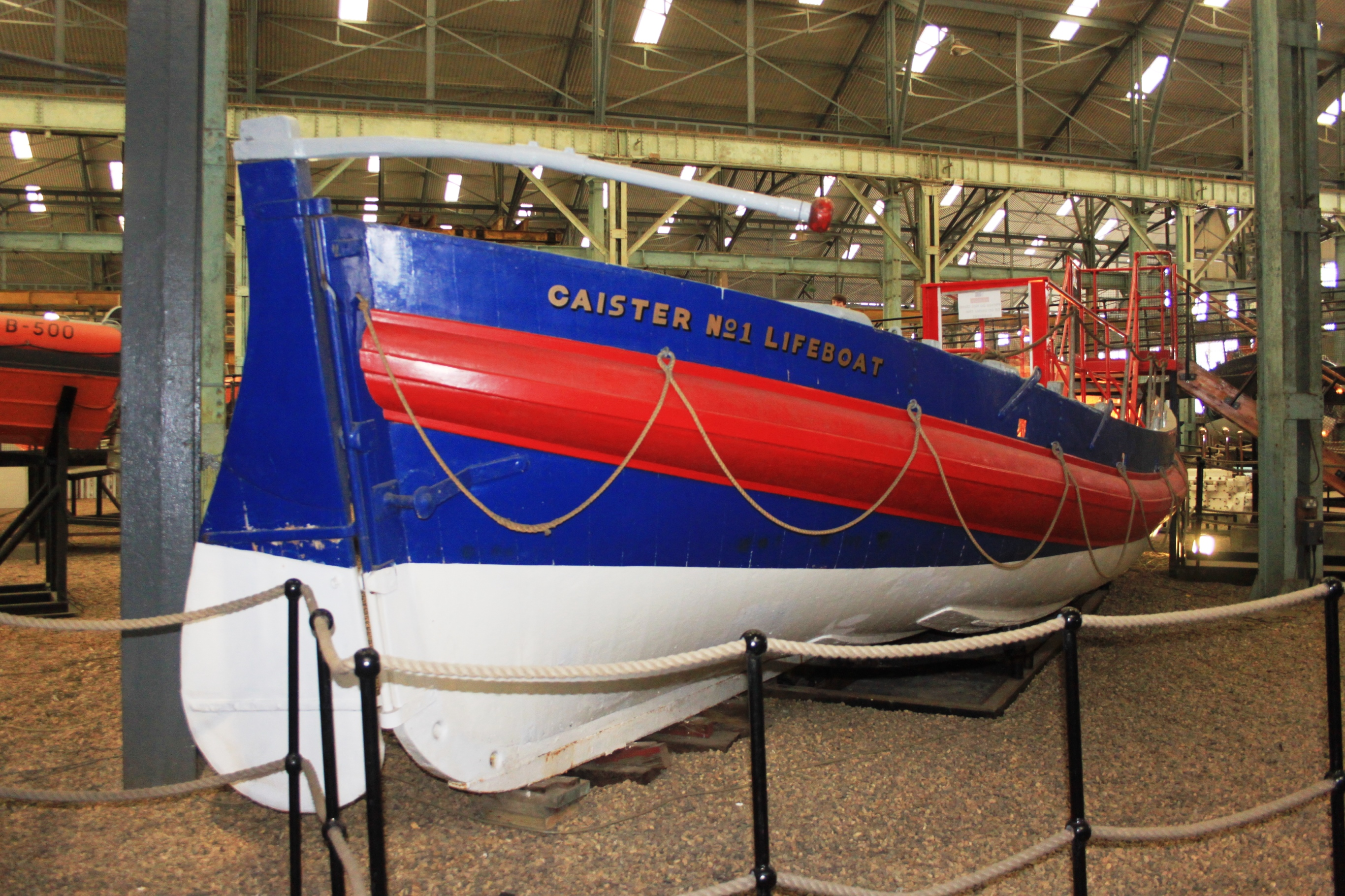
RNLB James Leath (ON 607), part of the RNLI Heritage Collection at Chatham Historic Dockyard

The two 46-foot lifeboats at Pakefield would cover an extraordinary period of 70 years service at Pakefield. The Two Sisters, Mary and Hannah was finally replaced in 1910, with a 42-foot lifeboat, funded from the bequest of £3049-6s-11d, for the provision of a lifeboat and equipment, from the late James Leath of Winchmore Hill, London. The James Leath (ON 607), would serve at Pakefield for just nine years, before being transferred to Caister and later Aldeburgh.

The James Leath was sold from service in 1936, but was later acquired by the Bristol Lifeboat Museum, and transferred to the RNLI Heritage Collection at Chatham Historic Dockyard in 1996.

A motor-powered lifeboat was placed at Lowestoft Lifeboat Station in 1921. As a result, Pakefield Lifeboat was withdrawn in 1922, and the station closed. It was agreed that the service boards would be placed in Pakefield Church.

Nothing remains of any of the three lifeboat houses at Pakefield. The last lifeboat at Pakefield at the time of closure, Hugh Taylor (ON 629), went on to serve at Aldeburgh. The boat was last reported as a yacht in Dordrecht in 1987.

== Station honours ==
The following are awards made at Pakefield.

- RNLI Silver Medal

Lt. Richard Joachim, RN, H.M. Coastguard Lowestoft – 1855 (Second-Service clasp)

George Warford, Coxswain – 1886

George Warford, Coxswain – 1898 (Second-Service clasp)

- Board of Trade Medal for Gallantry at Sea

Coxswain and 18 crew – 1858

== Pakefield lifeboats ==
=== Pakefield / Pakefield No. 1 ===
ON (Note: ON is the RNLI's Official Number of the boat.)	Name	Built	On station	Class	Comments
Pre-195	Marianne	1840	1840−1868	45-foot Norfolk and Suffolk (P&S)	(Note: 45-foot x 11-foot 2in (14/16-oared) Norfolk & Suffolk-class non-self-righting (P&S) lifeboat, built by Teasdel of Great Yarmouth, costing £300.); SHS lifeboat, renamed Sisters in 1868.
Pre-195	Sisters	1840	1868–1872	45-foot Norfolk and Suffolk (P&S)	(Note: Gift of Misses Sarah and Lydia Harris.)
23	Sisters	1872	1872−1876	46-foot Norfolk and Suffolk (P&S)	(Note: 46-foot 3in x 12-foot (14-oared) Norfolk & Suffolk-class non-self-righting (P&S) lifeboat, gift of Misses S. & L. Harris, built by Samuel R. Sparham of Lowestoft, costing £276.); Renamed The Two Sisters, Mary and Hannah in 1876.
23	The Two Sisters, Mary and Hannah	1872	1876−1886	46-foot Norfolk and Suffolk (P&S)	(Note: Legacy of Mr T. Perkin of Wigton.); Loaned to Lowestoft in 1886.
Station Closed 1886–1890
23	The Two Sisters, Mary and Hannah	1872	1890−1910	46-foot Norfolk and Suffolk (P&S)	
607	James Leath	1910	1910−1919	42-foot Norfolk and Suffolk (P&S)	(Note: 42-foot x 12-foot 6in (12-oared) Norfolk and Suffolk non-self-righting (P&S) lifeboat, built by Thames Ironworks, of Blackwall, London, costing £1,934.)
629	Hugh Taylor	1912	1919−1922	34-foot Norfolk and Suffolk (P&S) 'Surf-Boat'	(Note: 34-foot x 10-foot (12-oared) Norfolk & Suffolk-class non-self-righting (P&S) 'Surf-Boat, gift of Mrs E. Stratford of London, built by Thames Ironworks, of Blackwall, London, costing £1,250.); Previously at Gt. Yarmouth.

Station Closed, 1922
Pre ON numbers are unofficial numbers used by the Lifeboat Enthusiast Society to reference early lifeboats not included on the official RNLI list.

=== Pakefield No. 2 ===
ON	Name	Built	On station	Class	Comments
24	Henry Burford, RN	1870	1871−1895	30-foot 3in Norfolk and Suffolk (P&S) 'Surf-Boat'	(Note: 30-foot 3in x 9-foot 2in (12-oared) Norfolk & Suffolk-class (P&S) 'Surf-Boat', legacy of Mr John Legrew, built by James Beeching of Great Yarmouth, costing £142.)

Station Closed, 1895

== See also ==
- List of RNLI stations
- List of former RNLI stations
- Royal National Lifeboat Institution lifeboats
