= James Beeching =

English boat builder

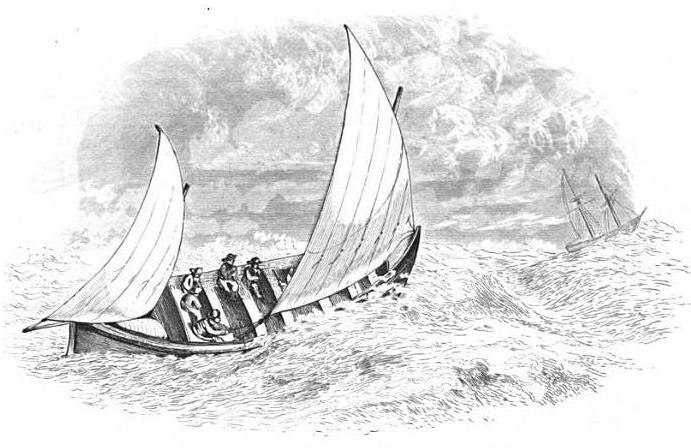
James Beeching's self-righting Lifeboat (1851)

James Beeching (1788 – 7 June 1858) was an English boat builder. He invented a "self-righting lifeboat", and designed a type of fishing boat which became characteristic of the port of Great Yarmouth in the 19th century. He also built ships for the smuggling trade.

== Life and work ==
Beeching was born at Bexhill in Sussex (now East Sussex), in 1788, to a family who had connections with smuggling, and served an apprenticeship in nearby Hastings as a boat builder. In 1809, he married Martha Thwaites (1789–1831), daughter of shipowner Thomas Thwaites; they went on to have nine children. Beeching and a partner ran a shipbuilding yard in Hastings for several years, until it failed in 1816 and was purchased by Thomas Thwaites. He then went to Flushing in the Netherlands, and built many craft, including several involved in the English smuggling trade such as the cutter known as "Big Jane", launched in 1819. On leaving Flushing he settled at Great Yarmouth in Norfolk where he introduced a design of fishing-vessel that for a time was characteristic of the port.

George Palmer, who was deputy chairman of the Royal National Lifeboat Institution for over 25 years, created a new design for a lifeboat which was officially adopted by the Institution in 1828. However, by 1848, Britain's lifeboats were found by the Admiralty to be unsatisfactory: of the 100 boats available, only 55 were in good repair, and many of those were of too heavy a construction; and 21 boats were found to be unfit for use. Lifeboat design was not standardised and the boats available, though an improvement on ordinary vessels, were vulnerable to heavy seas, which could lead to capsizing and loss of life.

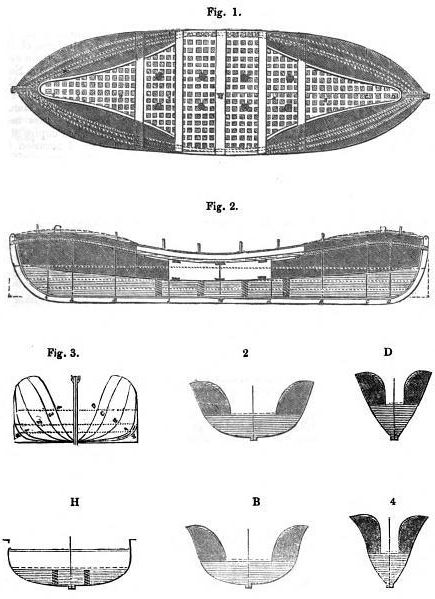
Northumberland Model lifeboat. Final design by James Peake based on submissions by James Beeching and others in 1851.

In 1851 attempts were made, under the auspices of Albert the Prince Consort, to revive the activity of the National Institution for the Preservation of Life from Shipwreck. A competition was initiated by the Admiralty for a new, improved lifeboat which would meet criteria: (a) being self-righting; (b) being of lighter construction than before and easier to launch and transport; (c) able to free itself of water faster (i.e. self-draining) and (d) of lower cost.

The Duke of Northumberland, president of the Institution, offered to fund a prize of £100 for the best scale model of a new lifeboat, and another £100 towards the cost of building it. Out of 280 models sent in from all parts of the world (a selection of which were displayed at the famous Crystal Palace exhibition of 1851), Beeching's "self-righting" design was awarded the prize. With a few slight modifications made by James Peake, who was a master shipwright at Woolwich Dockyard and one of the competition judges, this design became the standard model for the new fleet of lifeboats acquired by the Royal National Lifeboat Institution. It was known as the Beeching-Peake SR (self-righting) lifeboat.

Beeching had built a boat on the same model before the prize was awarded, and it was purchased by the trustees of Ramsgate Harbour in December 1851. "The Northumberland", as it was called, was 36 feet long and had 12 oars; she became the first self-righting lifeboat and was said to have been "one of the most frequently used and useful lifeboats in the United Kingdom", saving the lives of several hundred people on the Goodwin Sands.

James Beeching died on 7 June 1858, aged 70. The firm, "Beeching Brothers" (founded 1795) continued to build ships in Great Yarmouth for several decades after his death well into the 20th century, eventually including steam-powered vessels.

== Legacy ==
Beeching's self-righting lifeboat, together with other changes instituted by the RNLI, greatly improved Britain's lifeboat service in the latter half of the 19th century. The number of boats was increased from 96 in 1850 to 242 in 1874, and their improved reliability contributed to the saving of countless lives of both mariners and lifeboatmen.

== See also ==
- Southwold lifeboat RNLB Alfred Corry
- RNLB Benjamin Bond Cabbell (ON 12), built by James Beeching & Brothers and launched in 1884.
- Henry Greathead (1757–1818), lifeboat builder.
- Lionel Lukin (1742–1834), inventor of the lifeboat.
- William Wouldhave (1751–1821), produced the first self-righting design.
- Ellen Southard, a ship wreck that enlivened the debate for self-righting lifeboats to be adopted.
