= Teesmouth Lifeboat Station =

Former lifeboat station in Yorkshire, England

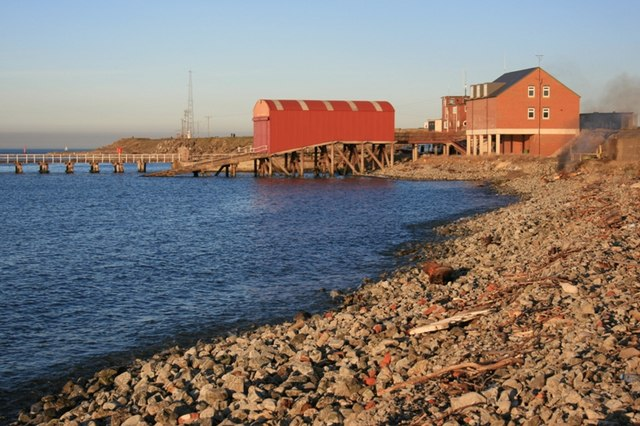
- The former Lifeboat Station at Teesmouth
- Interactive map of the Teesmouth Lifeboat Station area

General information
- Type: RNLI Lifeboat Station
- Location: South Gare, North Yorkshire, England
- Coordinates: 54.6403°N 1.1405°W
- Closed: 2006
- Demolished: 2010
- Owner: Royal National Lifeboat Institution

Teesmouth Lifeboat Station was latterly situated on the mouth of the River Tees, on the South Gare, in North Yorkshire, England.

A lifeboat was first placed at Teesmouth in 1829 by the Royal National Institution for the Preservation of Life from Shipwreck (RNIPLS), with management passing to the Tees Bay Lifeboat and Shipwreck Society (TBLSS) in 1843. It is thought that the station ceased operating sometime around 1854, when the TBLSS established a new station at Middlesbrough.

The Teesmouth Lifeboat Station was re-established in 1911 by the Royal National Lifeboat Institution (RNLI), operating until 2006, when it was decided that there was sufficient lifeboat cover provided by lifeboats at Hartlepool and Whitby.

== History ==
Very little is known about the early days of the Teesmouth lifeboat. The first lifeboat placed at Teesmouth is recorded as a 26-foot-6-inch (8.08 m) Palmer-class non-self-righting lifeboat, provided by the RNIPLS, and constructed by Harton of Limehouse in London. The boat allocated to Teesmouth, was one of the type developed by George Palmer, who as a young man had been shipwrecked, spending some while afloat on an upturned boat before being rescued. He recognised the need for an unsinkable lifeboat and designed a boat with extra buoyancy..

In 1843, the Palmer lifeboat was replaced by a 31-foot North Country non-self-righting lifeboat, a lifeboat based on the designs of Henry Greathead, and his Greathead-class lifeboat, constructed by Christopher Gale of Whitby, at a cost of £200. The lifeboat was provided and operated by the 'Tees Bay Lifeboat and Shipwreck Society' (TBLSS).

The siting of the lifeboat, and a rumoured boathouse of 1843, is unknown. A search of the detailed 1853 maps of the Tees estuary reveals no evidence of a boathouse. The site of Teesmouth Lifeboat Station is now known for being at South Gare, but this an area of reclaimed land and breakwater on the southern side of the mouth of the River Tees, and construction of the South Gare only started in 1859. The area previously being no more than a tidal river bank, it is likely that the Teesmouth station was situated close to Middlesbrough.

There are varying dates given for the duration of the Teesmouth lifeboat, some reports suggesting 1849, and c.1851. However, it is likely that the lifeboat remained in service until the new Middlesbrough lifeboat station opened on the Middlesbrough Dock Cut, in 1854.

In 1911, the RNLI provided a new lifeboat in response to the mounting number of shipwrecks on the east coast. This needed to be somewhere that a lifeboat could be launched and recovered no matter the weather or tide state and a new location on South Gare fitted the bill perfectly.

The South Gare Breakwater was completed in 1888, using slag transported from the steel and iron blast furnaces at Cargo Fleet (Middlesbrough), on the south side of the River Tees. To get the slag to the breakwater, a railway was built for ease of use. The truncated railway later became a leisure activity from which local people and tourists could take advantage of by using a sail bogey (a wagon powered by sails) to take a trip to the end of the breakwater. In the early days of sail bogey use on the line, the lifeboat men used it to get to their boathouse quickly when they were on a call-out. After it became derelict, the lifeboatmen used to gather in Redcar and take a bus to Teesmouth Lifeboat Station, which would cause traffic problems in Redcar.

A map showing the locations of both RNLI and independent lifeboat stations in Yorkshire

The first lifeboat at the new station, Reserve No. 2, had originally served at Ramsgate, a 'Pulling and Sailing' (P&S) lifeboat named Bradford, before receiving a motor conversion. The boat would then serve just across the Tees estuary at Seaton Snook, followed by a period at Seaham. On arrival at South Gare, the lifeboat was moored afloat, until a boathouse and slipway was constructed in 1914, at a cost of £4000.

At a meeting of the RNLI committee of management on Thursday 10 October 1912, it was resolved that the Teesmouth Lifeboat Station would be made permanent.

The Teesmouth lifeboat was one of six lifeboats called to the SS Rohilla, wrecked off Whitby on 30 October 1914. However, whilst being towed to the scene by the Teesmouth Harbour Commissioners tugboat, the lifeboat sprung a serious leak. The lifeboat crew were taken aboard the tug, and the lifeboat was towed back to Middlesbrough.

On 1 June 1961, the Teesmouth lifeboat Sarah Jane and James Season (ON 953) was launched to the aid of the 20-ton yawl Sybil Kathleen, on passage from the River Hamble to Norway. Heading out over the bar, the radio was knocked out of action, but in difficult conditions, motor-mechanic Coates managed to effect repairs. With considerable boat handling skills, Coxswain Stonehouse managed to get the lifeboat close enough on the fourth attempt, to get a line to the yawl. The vessel was towed out of danger, and then to a safe berth at Hartlepool. For this service, Coxswain John Service was awarded the RNLI Bronze Medal, with Mechanic Colin Coates accorded 'The Thanks of the Institution inscribed on Vellum'.

The relief Tyne-class lifeboat, 47-017 Owen and Ann Aisher (ON 1122), was launched on 26 August 1989 into near gale-force conditions, to assist the B-class (Atlantic 21) Inshore lifeboat from Redcar, which had been called to the aid of the fishing vessel Gang Warily, aground at the foot of Hunt Cliff. With the use of the X-class daughter boat, the two crew of the fishing boat were rescued. Coxswain Peter Race was awarded the RNLI Bronze Medal, with Acting Mechanic Christopher Jones accorded 'The Thanks of the Institution inscribed on Vellum'.

In 2003, a new shore facility, separate of the boathouse, was constructed, at a cost of £361,106. However, within months, it was announced that following a two-year review of lifeboat cover in the United Kingdom, the RNLI had decided to close Teesmouth lifeboat station. The withdrawal of the lifeboat capability from Teesmouth was subject to much criticism from the local council and the volunteers who crewed the boat, especially with regard to the waste of money on new station facilities. The RNLI responded, highlighting that an All-weather lifeboat (ALB) was stationed at Hartlepool, only 4 miles (6.4 km) away. Additionally, there were eight lifeboat stations along a 25-mile (40 km) stretch of coast where the Teesmouth lifeboat would operate. It also said that the costs of the new station building would be covered within 18 months of closure through non-operation, and that it hoped a new user for the building might be found. The Charity Commission acknowledged that the difficult decision was in the best interests of the Institution.

After the closure notice came, Redcar and Cleveland Council petitioned the RNLI to keep the station open for another year, after an offer of free moorings came from a local port operator. One of the key arguments about the Teesmouth Lifeboat, was that it could always launch whatever the weather (its slipway being located in 46 feet (14 m) of water and upstream of the mouth of the River Tees). This was borne out in October 1951 and November 1966, when the Teesmouth boat was launched to effect a rescue from SS Pandora and Neptune 1 after the Redcar, Runswick and Whitby lifeboats were unable to launch in the bad weather.

On the 29 April 2006, Teesmouth Lifeboat Station closed. The lifeboat on station at the time of closure, Tyne-class lifeboat 47-008 Phil Mead (ON 1110), was withdrawn form Teesmouth, to join the RNLI reserve fleet..

The lifeboat house was demolished in 2010, four years after the station closed.

In January 2024, a peppercorn lease of £100 per annum for the 2003 station facilities was agreed with the Tees and Hartlepool port authorities. The building will be used by the Teesmouth Seal Conservation Trust (TSCT).

== Station honours ==
The following are awards made at Teesmouth.

- RNLI Bronze Medal

John Stonehouse, Coxswain – 1961

Peter Roland Race, Coxswain – 1990

- The Maud Smith Award 1961
  (for the bravest act of lifesaving during the year by a member of a lifeboat crew)

John Stonehouse, Coxswain – 1961

- The Thanks of the Institution inscribed on Vellum

Colin Coates, Motor Mechanic – 1961

Christopher Jones, Acting Mechanic – 1990

- A Framed Letter of Thanks signed by the Chairman of the Institution

Coxswain and Crew – 1964

Coxswain and Crew – 1966

- A Collective Letter of Thanks signed by the Chairman of the Institution

Peter Race, Coxswain – 1993
John Race, Second Coxswain – 1993
Roderick Stott, Mechanic – 1993
Anthony Jamieson, Assistant Mechanic – 1993
Kevin Walpole, crew member – 1993
Christopher Jones, crew member – 1993
Kenneth Alexander, crew member – 1993
Andrew Colbeck, crew member – 1993
John Williams, crew member – 1993

== Teesmouth lifeboats ==
=== TBLSS lifeboats ===
Name	Built	On station	Class	Comments
Unnamed	1829	1829–1843	26-foot 6in Palmer non-self-righting	(Note: 26-foot 6in x 10-foot 6in Palmer-class non-self-righting lifeboat, funded by the RNIPLS, built by Harton of Limehouse, London.)
Unnamed	1843	1843–c.1854	31-foot North Country	(Note: 31-foot x 10-foot 6in North Country non-self-righting lifeboat, funded from local subscription, built by Christopher Gale of Whitby, costing £200.)

=== RNLI lifeboats ===
ON (Note: ON is the RNLI's Official Number of the boat.)	Op. No. (Note: Op. No. is the RNLI's Operational Number of the boat carried on the hull.)	Name	Built	On station	Class	Comments
350	–	Bradford	1893	1911–1917	42-foot Self-righting (motor)	(Note: 42-foot x 11-foot self-righting (motor) lifeboat, gift of the Bradford LB fund, built by Woolfe of Shadwell, London, costing £896 when new. Previously (P&S) lifeboat Bradford. Motorised 1906, re-engined 1907, single Tylor 30-hp.); Reserve lifeboat No.2, previously at Ramsgate (P&S), Harwich, Seaton Snook and Seaham.
647	–	Ethel Day Cardwell	1917	1917–1924	40-foot Self-righting (motor)	(Note: 40-foot x 10-foot 6in self-righting (motor) lifeboat, legacy of Mr J. T. Cardwell, with single 40-hp Tylor engine, built by S. E. Saunders of Cowes, costing £4,746.)
685	–	J. W. Archer	1924	1924–1950	45-foot Watson	
868	–	John and Lucy Cordingley	1949	1950–1960	46-foot 9in Watson	
953	–	Sarah Jane and James Season	1960	1960–1986	47-foot Watson	
1110	47-008	Phil Mead	1986	1986–2006	Tyne	

== See also ==
- List of RNLI stations
- List of former RNLI stations
- Royal National Lifeboat Institution lifeboats
