= Whitehaven Lifeboat Station =

Former RNLI Lifeboat station in Cumbria, England

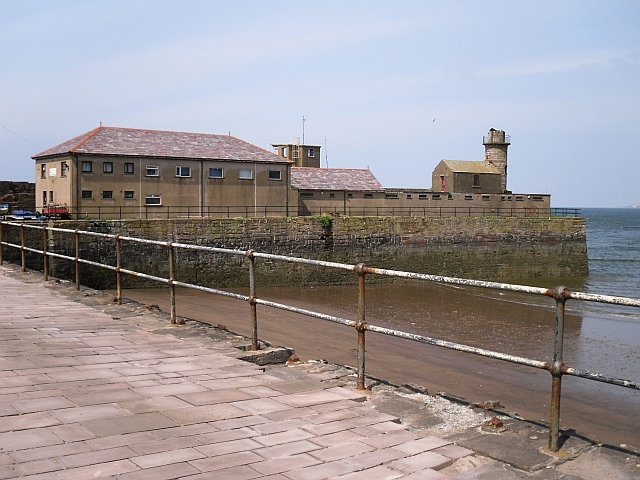
- First site of Whitehaven Lifeboat Station

- Whitehaven, Cumbria

General information
- Status: Closed
- Type: RNLI Lifeboat Station
- Location: (Old) New Quay, Whitehaven, Cumbria, England
- Coordinates: 54°33′03.0″N 3°35′50.0″W
- Opened: 1804 Whitehaven Harbour Trust; 1865 RNLI
- Closed: 1924

Whitehaven Lifeboat Station was located in the harbour town of Whitehaven, sitting approximately 38 miles (61 km) south-west of Carlisle, at nearly the most westerly point of Cumberland, Cumbria.

A lifeboat was first stationed at Whitehaven in 1804. The station was transferred to the management of the Royal National Lifeboat Institution (RNLI) in 1865.

On 18 Dec 1924, Whitehaven Lifeboat Station was closed.

== History ==
At a meeting of the Board of Trustees of the Town and Harbour of Whitehaven, on 30 September 1803, a decision was made to order for Whitehaven, the largest size of lifeboat available, from pioneering lifeboat builder Henry Greathead of South Shields. According to Greathead's documents, the 1½ ton (unnamed) boat for Whitehaven was a 12-oar 28-foot lifeboat, costing £149.

After a 4-day trip overland from South Shields, the boat arrived in Whitehaven on 10 January 1804.

It would be nearly 10 years until the boat was needed, when the vessel Brothers of Workington was washed ashore on 17 November 1813, at the entrance to the harbour. Even then, the lifeboat was not immediately available, its storage location at the time is unknown, and so the harbour boat with a crew of five, was first dispatched to the vessel. Sadly, one of those five crew, Thomas Farrell, was lost overboard. At a review following this incident by the harbour trustees in March 1814, a plan was made to provide a new lifeboat house on the New Quay.

In July 1865, it would appear that the transfer of the provision of a lifeboat at Whitehaven, from the Trustees to the RNLI, was at the instigation of the RNLI. The RNLI had been approached by a Miss Leicester, of London, with an offer of £300 to fund a lifeboat specifically for Whitehaven.

A 33-foot 10-oared self-righting boat, Robert Whitworth, costing £255 and built in 1864 by Forrestt of Limehouse, London, had served at Tynemouth for one year, and had then been transferred to Bridlington. However, she was found too heavy for Bridlington due to the soft sand, and it was this boat that was then placed at Whitehaven. A new boat house was constructed north of the North Pier, on land that is now Whitehaven Marina Yard, funded by the Harbour Commissioners, and costing £105. The boat arrived on 29 March 1866, and was renamed Elizabeth, after the donor's mother. (The lifeboat is recorded as Elizabeth Leicester on the service board, but as Elizabeth on all other documents).

On 14 November 1871, the sloop Demetian Lass (Dometian Lass) was abandoned whilst on passage from Runcorn, to the Isle of Skye, Outer Hebrides, before she drifted back out to sea. Her crew of four were rescued by the Whitehaven lifeboat.

Whitehaven got another boat in 1875, officially placed at Whitehaven No.2 station. This was actually Seascale Lifeboat Station, some 13 miles down the coast, but with all the crew being Whitehaven men. The station was closed in 1895, the lifeboat having launching just four times in 20 years, and having carried out just one successful rescue of 3 men, in its first year. For more information, please see –

- Seascale Lifeboat Station

Two more lifeboats were assigned to Whitehaven, the first in 1884 and then one in 1903. Both were named Elizabeth Leicester.

On 10 May 1885, the Norwegian barque Thorsbjerg parted both her cables, and was driven ashore, while awaiting the tide to enter the port. Her crew of nine, and the Pilot, were rescued by the Whitehaven Lifeboat Elizabeth Leicester (ON 78).

The 1865 boathouse was demolished in 1909, with a new one constructed on the same site. In 1924, it was noted that there had been no service calls since February 1918, over six years. At a meeting of the RNLI Committee of Management on 18 Dec 1924, the decision was taken to close the station with immediate effect. Six Whitehaven lifeboats had been called upon 19 times, and saved 33 lives, plus the whole crew of the Thistle in 1819, whose numbers were not recorded.

The site of the boathouse is now a boatyard. The lifeboat on station at the time of closure, Elizabeth Leicester (ON 507), was sold from service in 1925, and last reported as a derelict yacht in Newport, Wales in 2004.

== Whitehaven lifeboats ==
=== Whitehaven Harbour Trust ===
Name	Built	On station	Class	Comments
Unnamed	1803	1804−1823	28-foot Greathead	(Note: 28-foot x 10-foot (12-oared) non-self-righting lifeboat, provided by the Whitehaven Harbour trust, built by Henry Greathead of South Shields.)
Unnamed	1823	1823−1853	28-foot North Country	(Note: 28-foot x 10-foot (10/12-oared) North Country non-self-righting lifeboat, funded by Harbour Dues, built by Thomas Cowen of Whitehaven, costing £60.)
Unnamed	1853	1853−1866	27-foot Peake Self-righting (P&S) lifeboat	(Note: 27-foot x 7-foot 6in (8-oared) Peake-class self-righting (P&S) lifeboat, built by Forrestt of Limehouse, London.)

=== RNLI ===
ON (Note: ON is the RNLI's Official Number of the boat.)	Name	Built	On station	Class	Comments
Pre-419	Elizabeth	1864	1866−1884	33-foot Peake Self-righting (P&S)	(Note: 33-foot x 8-foot (10-oared) Peake-class self-righting (P&S) lifeboat, gift of Miss Leicester of London, built by Forrestt of Limehouse, London, costing £250 when new.); Previously Robert Whitworth at Tynemouth and Bridlington.
78	Elizabeth Leicester	1884	1884−1903	34-foot Self-righting (P&S)	(Note: 34-foot x 8-foot (10-oared) self-righting (P&S) lifeboat, gift of Miss E. Leicester of Bayswater, built by Woolfe of Shadwell, London, costing £317.)
507	Elizabeth Leicester	1903	1903−1924	35-foot Self-righting (P&S)	(Note: 35-foot x 8-foot 6in (10-oared) self-righting (P&S) lifeboat, gift of the late Miss E. Leicester of Bayswater, built by Thames Ironworks of Blackwall, London, costing £792.)

Pre ON numbers are unofficial numbers used by the Lifeboat Enthusiast Society to reference early lifeboats not included on the official RNLI list.

=== Whitehaven No.2 Station ===
Please see Seascale Lifeboat Station

== See also ==
- List of RNLI stations
- List of former RNLI stations
- Royal National Lifeboat Institution lifeboats
