= List of shipwrecks in October 1884 =

The list of shipwrecks in October 1884 includes ships sunk, foundered, grounded, or otherwise lost during October 1884.

== 1 October ==
List of shipwrecks: 1 October 1884
Ship	State	Description
County of Forfar	United Kingdom	The ship ran aground on Île Amsterdam. She was on a voyage from Buenos Aires, Argentina to Batavia, Netherlands East Indies. She was refloated with the assistance of a steamship.
English Girl	United Kingdom	The ship ran aground on the Cork Sand, in the North Sea off the coast of Essex. She was on a voyage from a Scottish port to Whitstable, Kent. She was refloated and resumed her voyage.
Helen	United Kingdom	The Mersey Flat sank at New Brighton, Cheshire. She was on a voyage from Garston to Southport, Lancashire.
Thomas Green	United Kingdom	The ship ran aground on the Silloth Bank, in the Irish Sea off the coast of Cumberland. She was on a voyage from Dalbeattie, Kirkcudbrightshire to Silloth, Cumberland.

== 2 October ==
List of shipwrecks: 2 October 1884
Ship	State	Description
Vice Reine	Canada	The ship was sighted whilst on a voyage from Calcutta, India to New York, United States. No further trace, reported overdue.

== 4 October ==
List of shipwrecks: 4 October 1884
Ship	State	Description
Fleetwing	United Kingdom	The fishing boat was driven ashore at Wells-next-the-Sea, Norfolk. Her crew were rescued.
Napoli	Germany	The steamship ran aground at IJmuiden. She was on a voyage from a Baltic port to Amsterdam. She was refloated with assistance.
Palm	United Kingdom	The steamship ran aground in Lake Timsah. She was on a voyage from Liverpool, Lancashire to Java, Netherlands East Indies. She was refloated the next day and resumed her voyage.
Simiote	United Kingdom	The steamship was driven ashore and wrecked 300 nautical miles (560 km) south of Figueira da Foz, Portugal. Her crew were rescued. She was on a voyage from Glasgow, Renfrewshire to Smyrna, Ottoman Empire.

== 5 October ==
List of shipwrecks: 5 October 1884
Ship	State	Description
Melanie	Russia	The schooner foundered off Great Yarmouth, Norfolk, United Kingdom. Her crew were rescued by a fishing smack. She was on a voyage from London, United Kingdom to Riga.

== 6 October ==
List of shipwrecks: 6 October 1884
Ship	State	Description
Bickley	United Kingdom	The steamship was driven ashore on the Isle of Mull, Inner Hebrides. She was on a voyage from Liverpool, Lancashire to Copenhagen, Denmark.
Black Diamond	United Kingdom	The steamship ran aground at Ryhope, County Durham. She was on a voyage from London to Sunderland, County Durham.

== 7 October ==
List of shipwrecks: 7 October 1884
Ship	State	Description
Speedwell	United Kingdom	The steam cutter ran aground on the Cross Sands, in the North Sea off the coast of Norfolk and sank. Her crew were rescued by the Caister Lifeboat.

== 9 October ==
List of shipwrecks: 9 October 1884
Ship	State	Description
Ethel	United Kingdom	The lighter was run into by the steamship Antic (United Kingdom) at Goole, Yorkshire and was beached.
Keelung	United Kingdom	The steamship was wrecked on Dodd's Island. All on board were rescued. She was on a voyage from Shantou to Shanghai, China.

== 10 October ==
List of shipwrecks: 10 October 1884
Ship	State	Description
Annie	United Kingdom	The brigantine ran aground on the South Bull, in the Irish Sea off the coast of County Louth and was abandoned by her crew. She was on a voyage from Ayr to Drogheda, County Louth.
Black Hawk	United Kingdom	The ship broke from her moorings at Bangor, County Down. She drove against the pier and sprang a leak.
Bonnie Dunkeld	United Kingdom	The ship departed from South Shields, County Durham for Teignmouth, Devon. No further trace, reported missing.
Eliza	United Kingdom	The schooner ran aground on the Doom Bar. Her crew were taken off by the lifeboat Arab ( Royal National Lifeboat Institution). Eliza was on a vpoyage from Porthcawl, Glamorgan to Penzance, Cornwall.
Ettrickdale	United Kingdom	The ship departed from Amsterdam, North Holland, Netherlands for Glasgow, Renfrewshire. No further trace, reported overdue.
Gypsy	United Kingdom	The schooner was driven ashore at Llandudno, Caernarfonshire.
Just	United Kingdom	The ship broke from her moorings at Bangor, County Down. She drove against the pier and sprang a leak.
Port	United Kingdom	The ship broke from her moorings at Bangor, County Down. She drove against the pier and sprang a leak.
Samarang	United Kingdom	The barque ran aground near Saltburn-by-the-Sea, County Durham. Her twenty crew were rescued by the Redcar and Saltburn Lifeboats. She was on a voyage from Quebec City, Canada to Newcastle upon Tyne, Northumberland.

== 11 October ==
List of shipwrecks: 11 October 1884
Ship	State	Description
Europa	United Kingdom	The steamship was run into by Roseville (United Kingdom) and sank off the Cloch Lighthouse with the loss of five of her nineteen crew. Survivors were rescued by Roseville. Europa was on a voyage from Glasgow, Renfrewshire to Málaga, Spain.
Light of Age	United Kingdom	The smack departed from Hull, Yorkshire. No further trace, presumed foundered with the loss of all five crew.
Morjord and Truby	United Kingdom	The barque was wrecked whilst on a voyage from Grangemouth, Stirlingshire, to Plymouth, England. The crew took to the rigging and all but three were rescued by the Harwich Lifeboat.
Unnamed	United States	A lighter was severely damaged by fire at Boston, Massachusetts.

== 13 October ==
List of shipwrecks: 13 October 1884
Ship	State	Description
Eros	Norway	The schooner foundered in the North Sea. Her crew were rescued by the smack Emma (United Kingdom). Eros was on a voyage from Troon, Ayrshire, United Kingdom to Horten.

== 14 October ==
List of shipwrecks: 14 October 1884
Ship	State	Description
Galathée	France	The ship arrived at Montevideo, Uruguay on fire. She was on a voyage from Havre de Grâce, Seine-Inférieure to Montevideo.
Scutulo	Italy	The ship ran aground off Cape Kara, Greece. She was refloated in 17 October.

== 17 October ==
List of shipwrecks: 17 October 1884
Ship	State	Description
A. R. Noyes	United States	The barge sank in Lake Champlain off Shelburne Point, Vermont (44°27.2′N 073°14.7′W).

== 18 October ==
List of shipwrecks: 18 October 1884
Ship	State	Description
Craigforth	United Kingdom	The steamship was driven ashore at Rosehearty, Aberdeenshire. Her cargo of 3,200 sheep and 16 ponies were thrown overboard; 2,500 sheep and all the ponies swam ashore. Her crew and passengers were rescued. She was on a voyage from Iceland to Leith, Lothian.
Messina	Germany	The steamship ran aground at Marseille, Bouches-du-Rhône, France. She was refloated and taken in to Marseille in a leaky condition.

== 19 October ==
List of shipwrecks: 19 October 1884
Ship	State	Description
Douglass	United Kingdom	The steam lighter was driven ashore in the Clyde at Kempock Point. She was refloated and towed in to Greenock, Renfrewshire in a severely leaky condition.

== 21 October ==
List of shipwrecks: 21 October 1884
Ship	State	Description
Maria Stella	France	The schooner suffered an onboard explosion at Porthcawl, Glamorgan, United Kingdom. Two of her crew were severely injured.
Rose	Netherlands	The brig was driven ashore and wrecked at Nexø, Bornholm, Denmark. She was on a voyage from Skutskär, Sweden to Groningen.

== 23 October ==
List of shipwrecks: 23 October 1884
Ship	State	Description
Allende	United Kingdom	The steamship struck rocks off Penmarc'h, Finistère, France and was holed. She was on a voyage from Bilbao, Spain to Cardiff, Glamorgan. She put in to Brest, Finistère waterlogged at the bow.
Christine	Germany	The ship departed from Hartlepool, County Durham, united Kingdom for Wilhelmshaven. No further trace, reported missing.
Lightning	United Kingdom	The steamship departed from the River Tyne for Trondheim, Norway. No further trace, reported missing.

== 24 October ==
List of shipwrecks: 24 October 1884
Ship	State	Description
Christina Nilsson	United States	The schooner struck a reef and sank in Lake Michigan off Baileys Harbor, Wisconsin, during a blizzard.
Thames	United Kingdom	The steamship departed from Invergordon, Ross-shire for Trondheim, Norway. No further trace, reported missing.

== 25 October ==
List of shipwrecks: 25 October 1884
Ship	State	Description
Depositor	Canada	The full-rigged ship was driven ashore and wrecked at Peel, Isle of Man. All on board were rescued by the Peel Lifeboat. She was on a voyage from Barrow-in-Furness, Lancashire, United Kingdom to New Orleans, Louisiana, United States.
Effective	United Kingdom	The steamship ran aground off Punta Mala, Spain.
Splendid	United Kingdom	The schooner was driven ashore at Ayr. Her crew were rescued by rocket apparatus. She was on a voyage from Newry, County Antrim to Ayr.
Success	United Kingdom	The steam wherry was driven ashore and wrecked at Boulmer, Northumberland. Her crew were rescued by the Boulmer Lifeboat.
York	United Kingdom	The steamship was driven ashore and wrecked in Åland, Grand Duchy of Finland. Her crew were rescued.

== 26 October ==
List of shipwrecks: 26 October 1884
Ship	State	Description
Amaranth	United Kingdom	The schooner collided with the steamship St Jacques (France and sank off Dungeness, Kent with the loss of four of her six crew. Survivors were rescued by the smack Favourite (United Kingdom).
Danubian	United Kingdom	The steamship struck rocks at "Nakaria Island" and foundered. Her 22 crew were rescued by Mount's Bay (United Kingdom). Danubian was on a voyage from Alexandria, Egypt to Leith, Lothian.
Hillsborough	Canada	The ketch was driven ashore and wrecked on Sully Island, Glamorgan, United Kingdom. She was on a voyage from Lydney, Gloucestershire to Barnstaple, Devon, United Kingdom.
Lady Josyan	United Kingdom	The steamship collided with the steamship Hero (United Kingdom) and sank in the North Sea. Her crew were rescued by Hero.
Lizzie Jane	United Kingdom	The smack was wrecked on Papa Westray, Orkney Islands.
Marianne	Norway	The brig was driven ashore and wrecked at Anstruther, Fife, United Kingdom. She was on a voyage from Kronstadt, Russia to Alloa, Clackmannanshire, United Kingdom. She was refloated on 2 November and taken in to Anstruther, Fife. She was condemned and scuttled as a breakwater.
Pearl	United Kingdom	The ketch became a wreck after going ashore near Padstow, Cornwall during a gale. Her three crew were rescued. She was on a voyage from Poole, Dorset to Bristol, Gloucestershire.
Perle	Denmark	The schooner was driven ashore and wrecked near Dunbar, Lothian. She was on a voyage from Rochester, Kent to Alloa, Clackmannanshire, United Kingdom.
Tarleton Lass	United Kingdom	The schooner was driven ashore on Walney Island, Lancashire.

== 27 October ==
List of shipwrecks: 27 October 1884
Ship	State	Description
Blue Bell	United Kingdom	The yacht was driven ashore at Largs, Ayrshire. All on board were rescued.
Chang Chow	China	The ship was driven ashore at "Sandy Cape". Seven people were reported missing. She was on a voyageb from China to Newcastle, New South Wales.
Mary Saunders	United Kingdom	The schooner was driven ashore and severely damaged at Gourock, Renfrewshire. Her crew were rescued but her captain refused to abandon ship.
Peri	United Kingdom	The schooner was driven ashore at Abergele, Denbighshire.
Petrel	United Kingdom	The ship departed from Middlesbrough, Yorkshire for Ipswich, Suffolk. No further trace, reported overdue.
Theonore	Norway	The barque was driven ashore at Helensburgh, Dunbartonshire, United Kingdom. She was refloated.
Two unnamed vessels	United Kingdom	Two lighters were driven ashore at Port Glasgow, Renfrewshire in heavy gales.

== 28 October ==
List of shipwrecks: 28 October 1884
Ship	State	Description
Avebury	United Kingdom	The steamship was driven ashore at Rosemodress, near Lamorna, Cornwall. Her crew survived. She was on a voyage from Lisbon, Portugal to Cardiff, Glamorgan. She broke in two on 5 November.
Blackwall	United Kingdom	The ship ran aground. She was on a voyage from Saint John, New Brunswick, Canada to Fleetwood, Lancashire. She was refloated with assistance from the tug Fylde (United Kingdom), which towed her in to Fleetwood in a waterlogged condition.
Maartje	Netherlands	The lugger capsized in the North Sea with the loss of thirteen of her fifteen crew. Survivors were rescued the next day by the smack General Wolseley (United Kingdom).
Sisters	United Kingdom	The ship was abandoned off Girvan, Ayrshire. Her crew were rescued by the Girvan Lifeboat but her captain refused to abandon ship. She was on a voyage from Troon, Ayrshire to Galveston, Texas, United States.
SMS Undine	Imperial German Navy	The training ship, a brig, was wrecked on the Agger Tange, Denmark during a storm with the loss of one life.
William Hope	United Kingdom	The steamship was driven ashore at Fraserburgh, Aberdeenshire. Her crew were rescued.
Fraserburgh Lifeboat	Royal National Lifeboat Institution	The lifeboat capsized at Fraserburgh whilst going to the assistance of a fishing vessel. Her crew were rescued.
Unnamed	Flag unknown	A schooner foundered 3 nautical miles (5.6 km) east of Flamborough Head, Yorkshire, United Kingdom with the loss of all hands.

== 29 October ==
List of shipwrecks: 29 October 1884
Ship	State	Description
John Heinrich	Germany	The schooner foundered in the Dogger Bank. Her crew were rescued by the smack Harold (United Kingdom). John Heinrich was on a voyage from Tayport, Fife, United Kingdom to Königsberg.
Rocca Schiaffino	Italy	The barque struck a rock off Tarifa, Spain and was holed. She was on a voyage from Philadelphia, Pennsylvania, United States to Genoa. She was towed in to Gibraltar in a waterlogged condition by the tug Hercules ( (United Kingdom of Great Britain and Ireland) Gibraltar).

== 31 October ==
List of shipwrecks: 31 October 1884
Ship	State	Description
Taff	United Kingdom	The steamship sank at Millwall, Essex.
Tarlayr	United Kingdom	The schooner was abandoned in the North Sea. Her crew were rescued by a Dutch vessel. She was on a voyage from Leven, Fife to Lossiemouth, Moray.

== Unknown date ==
List of shipwrecks: Unknown date in October 1884
Ship	State	Description
Adlet	Germany	The schooner ran aground at Memel.
Alliance	United Kingdom	The barque was driven ashore at Grimsby, Lincolnshire. She was later refloated and taken in to Grimsby.
Angela	Flag unknown	The ship ran aground on the Spijkerplaat, off the coast of Zeeland, Netherlands. She was on a voyage from Antwerp, Belgium to Turku, Grand Duchy of Finland.
Ann	(United Kingdom of Great Britain and Ireland) Isle of Man	The fishing lugger was driven ashore and wrecked at Port Erin. Her crew were rescued.
Atlantis	United Kingdom	The ship was driven ashore at Pointe-à-Pitre, Guadeloupe. She was refloated.
Auguste	Germany	The schooner was driven ashore on Öland, Sweden.
Austria	United Kingdom	The ship was driven ashore on Ailsa Craig. She floated off on 18 October and sank.
Baltic	United Kingdom	The barque was driven ashore at Aldeburgh, Suffolk.
Benayo	United Kingdom	The steamship ran aground at IJmuiden, North Holland, Netherlands. She was on a voyage from Galaţi, Romania to Amsterdam, North Holland. She was refloated.
Bickley	United Kingdom	The ship was driven ashore on Coll, Inner Hebrides.
Bonnington	United Kingdom	The steamship ran aground in the Torres Strait. She was refloated and taken in to Bombay, India.
Bresloir	France	The steamship collided with the steamship Chateau Yquen (France) and sank at Bordeaux, Gironde.
Buster	United Kingdom	The ship ran aground on the West Hoyle Bank, in Liverpool Bay. She was on a voyage from Parrsboro, Nova Scotia, Canada to Liverpool, Lancashire. She was refloated and taken in to Liverpool in a leaky condition.
Carn Brea	United Kingdom	The ship caught fire at Wilmington, North Carolina.
Clara	United Kingdom	The Mersey Flat collided with the steamship Brighouse (United Kingdom) and sank at Liverpool. Her crew were rescued.
Concordia	Germany	The brigantine was driven ashore at Lemvig, Denmark. She was on a voyage from Arendal, Norway to Elsfleth.
Cyprus	United Kingdom	The steamship was driven ashore at "Forefors", Sweden. She was refloated and taken in to Oskarshamn.
Despatch	United Kingdom	The fishing lugger was run into by a steamship and sank with the loss of all hands, ten or twelve lives.
Dora	Flag unknown	The brig foundered in the Gulf of California with the loss of all hands. She was on a voyage from San Francisco, California, United States to San Blas, Mexico.
Duke of Devonshire	United Kingdom	The steamship ran aground at Geelong, Victoria. She was later refloated.
Easington	United Kingdom	The steamship was destroyed by fire at Buenos Aires, Argentina.
Enigheden	Sweden	The "frigate" collided with the steamship Drewton (United Kingdom) and sank at Hveen. Her crew were rescued. Enigheden was on a voyage from Ystad to Strömstad.
Elsie Ker	United Kingdom	The steamship ran aground and sank off Trapani, Sicily, Italy with the loss of two of her crew. She was on a voyage from Newport, Monmouthshire to Brindisi, Italy.
Fenstanton	United Kingdom	The steamship was driven ashore on Thursday Island, Queensland. Her crew were rescued. She subsequently broke up.
Formosa	Austria-Hungary	The barque was driven ashore at Stefano Point, Ottoman Empire. She was on a voyage from Batoum, Russia to Genoa, Italy.
Gracieuse	France	The ship was wrecked near Allonby, Cumberland, United Kingdom.
Hebe	Sweden	The schooner collided with the steamship Öresund (Sweden) and was severely damaged. Hebe was on a voyage from "Wenersburg" to Aarhus, Denmark. She was towed in to Copenhagen, Denmark in a waterlogged condition by Öresund.
Helen Burns	United Kingdom	The ship was destroyed by fire at sea. Her crew were rescued. She was on a voyage from Liverpool to Valparaíso, Chile.
Ida Maria	United Kingdom	The ship was destroyed by fire at Whydah, Dahomey.
Lincoln	Norway	The schooner ran aground at Memel.
Little Beck	United Kingdom	The steamship was driven ashore near the mouth of the Maas with the loss of fourteen of the twenty people on board. She was on a voyage from the Danube to Rotterdam, South Holland.
Madgus	United Kingdom	The steamship foundered 150 nautical miles (280 km) northwards of Sydney, New South Wales. All on board were rescued. She was on her maiden voyage, from Sunderland, County Durham to Sydney.
Mabel	United States	The whaler was discovered abandoned in the Pacific Ocean by the whaler Eliza (United States, which put four of her crew aboard with the intention of taking her into a port.
Maria	Germany	The Galiot was driven ashore on Sylt.
Mermaid	United Kingdom	The ship ran aground. She was on a voyage from Guernsey, Channel Isles to London. She was refloated and put in to Dover, Kent in a severely leaky condition.
Mirford and Trubey	United Kingdom	The barque was wrecked off the coast of Essex.
Moorhen	United Kingdom	The steamship ran aground off Cape Sardinia, Spain and was damaged.
Nordstern	Netherlands	The schooner was driven ashore at Neufahrwasser, Germany. She was on a voyage from Riga, Russia to Rotterdam, South Holland.
Nummer Funf	Germany	The barque ran aground at Memel.
Regian	Flag unknown	The steamship was driven ashore at "Rasse Dowe", Egypt. She was refloated the next day and taken in to Suez, Egypt.
Reginald	United Kingdom	The steamship ran aground in the Swash, off the coast of Somerset. She was later refloated and taken in to Bristol.
Relative	United Kingdom	The schooner ran aground on the Platter Rocks. She was on a voyage from Liverpool to Cork. She was refloated and put in to Holyhead, Anglesey in a leaky condition.
Robert	United Kingdom	The schooner was driven ashore 2 1/4 nautical miles (4.2 km) south of the Cairnryan Lighthouse, Wigtownshire. Her crew survived. She was on a voyage from Holyhead, Anglesey to Sligo.
Robert Preston	United Kingdom	The schooner was driven ashore at Drumore, Wigtownshire. She was on a voyage from Maryport, Cumberland to the Strangford Lough.
Roseville	United Kingdom	The ship was driven ashore in the Clyde. She was refloated on 25 October but had to be beached due to a defective pump.
Selah Chamberlain	United States	The steamship was driven against the quayside at Port Arthur, Ontario, Canada.
Sheldon	United Kingdom	The steamship ran aground at Grimsby. She was on a voyage from Söderhamn, Sweden to Grimsby.
Siri	Sweden	The derelict barque was driven ashore on Skagen, Denmark. She was on a voyage from Hull, Yorkshire, United Kingdom to Ystad.
Soumanoura	Japan	The barque collided with the steamship Yamashiro (Japan and sank at Yokohama.
Swift	United Kingdom	The steamship caught fire at Sharpness, Gloucestershire and was beached. She was on a voyage from Bristol, Gloucestershire to Sharpness. The fire was extinguished.
Tine	Netherlands	The brig was driven ashore and wrecked at Thisted, Denmark. She was on a voyage from Honfleur, Manche to Riga.
Trial	United Kingdom	The ship ran aground on the Long Rock, off the coast of County Down. She was refloated and taken in to Donaghadee, County Down.
Ville de Para	France	The steamship struck a sunken rock off Point Gands, Gran Canaria, Canary Islands and foundered with the loss of two lives. She was on a voyage from Havre de Grâce, Seine-Inférieure to Montevideo, Uruguay.
William and Mary	United Kingdom	The dandy was driven ashore at Rye, Sussex. She was on a voyage from Rye to Goole, Yorkshire.
Unnamed	Flag unknown	A steamship was driven ashore at Cape Carvoeiro, Portugal. Her crew survived.
