= Saltburn Lifeboat Station =

Former lifeboat station in North Yorkshire, England

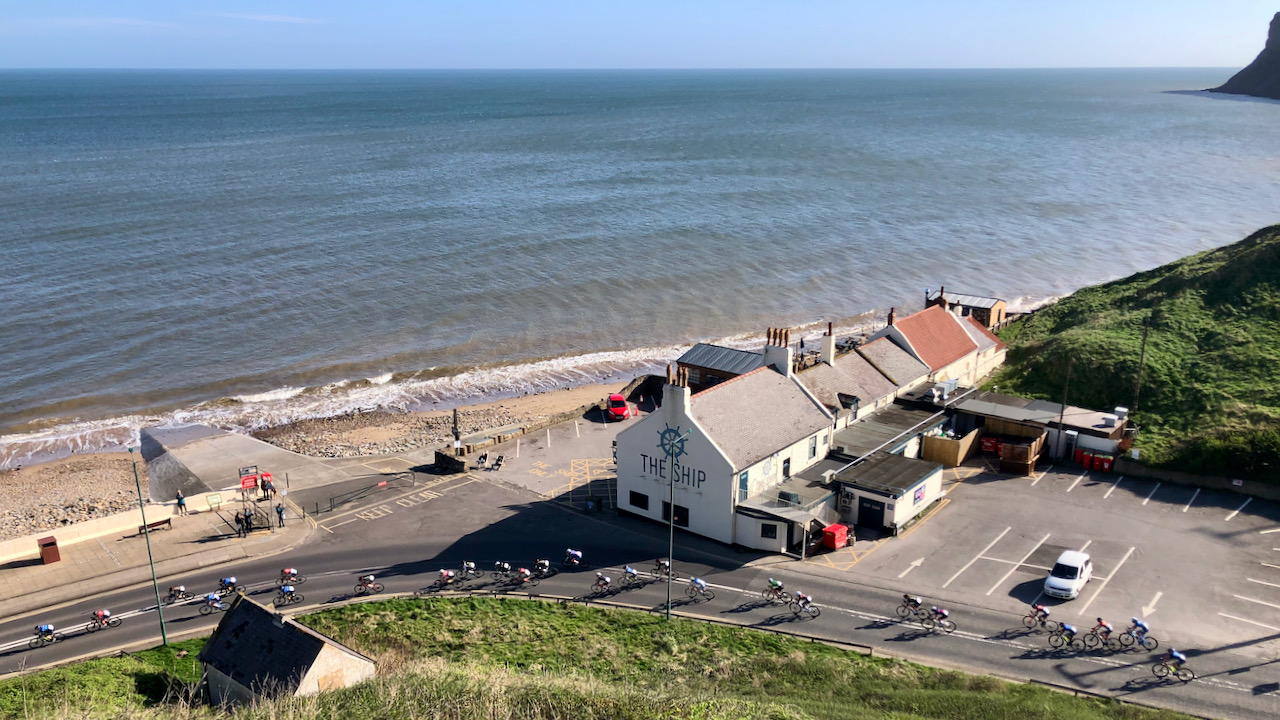
- Former location of Saltburn Lifeboat House

- Saltburn, North Yorkshire

General information
- Status: Closed
- Type: RNLI Lifeboat Station
- Location: Saltburn, North Yorkshire, England
- Coordinates: 54°35′06.1″N 0°57′55.7″W
- Opened: 1849
- Closed: 1922

Saltburn Lifeboat Station was located at Marine Terrace, on Saltburn Road, adjacent to the Ship Inn, just to the east side of Saltburn-by-the-Sea, on the coast of North Yorkshire.

A lifeboat was first stationed at Saltburn in 1849 by the Tees Bay Lifeboat and Shipwreck Society (TBLSS). Management of the station was transferred to the Royal National Lifeboat Institution (RNLI) in 1858.

After 73 years service, Saltburn Lifeboat Station closed in 1922.

== History ==
In 1849, the Tees Bay Lifeboat and Shipwreck Society (TBLSS) decided to place a lifeboat at Saltburn-by-the-Sea. The lifeboat was a 30-foot 'North Country' type, similar to the Greathead type lifeboat Zetland, which served at Redcar. When required, the boat would have been crewed by lifeboat men from Redcar. No service or other records have been found, other than the boat cost £160.

In 1858, at the request of the TBLSS, and following visits by the RNLI Inspector of Lifeboats, Capt. John Ward, the management of their three stations, Middlesbrough, Redcar and Saltburn, was transferred to the RNLI. In 1860, the station benefitted from a new lifeboat carriage, and a new boathouse was constructed across the road from the Ship Inn, just to the east of Saltburn, costing £138-10s-0d.

In 1868, funds from the legacy of Mr. John Appleyard of Halifax were appropriated to the station, and the unnamed lifeboat was named Appleyard.

The Appleyard was called to the aid of the steamship Grinkle on 9 December 1874, on passage from the River Tyne to La Rochelle, when she was driven ashore at Saltburn. The crew of 10 were rescued.

In 1878, funds from the £1000 legacy of Mr. Thomas Firbank were appropriated to the Saltburn lifeboat station, with the boat being renamed once again, now being the Thomas and Isabella Firbank of Kingston-upon-Hull.

Saltburn would get a new boat in 1880, a 34-foot self-righting 'Pulling and Sailing' (P&S) lifeboat, one with sails and (10) oars, constructed by Woolfe of Shadwell, London. The lifeboat was funded, via the Manchester branch of the RNLI, from a generous gift of £1000 from Mrs Ann Townend of Puckrup Hall, Tewkesbury. The lifeboat and its new carriage arrived at Saltburn by rail. On 19 August 1880, the boat was taken in procession from the railway station through the streets of the town, to the boathouse, where the lifeboat was named Charles and Ann (ON 215), after the donor, and her late husband, who died the previous year. The legacy of Mr Firbank was reassigned to the Middlesbrough lifeboat.

On the afternoon of the 8 December 1882, the Charles and Ann was launched to the aid of the Libra of Boekzetelerfehn, bound for Hamburg carrying a cargo of Guano, when she ran aground off Saltburn. Her five German crewmen were rescued.

The Charles and Ann would be launched 11 times, saving 29 lives in a 17-year period at Saltburn. She would be replaced in 1897 by the Mary Batger (ON 410). This was another 34-foot lifeboat, this time constructed by Chambers and Colby of Lowestoft, provided from the legacy of Mrs. Mary Scales of Armley, Leeds.

On 9 January 1901, Mary Batger was launched to the aid of the steam-trawler Honoria of Hull, fully laden with fish, and on her return voyage from the Faroe Islands, when she ran aground at Marske-by-the-Sea. The lifeboat would first be caught up in the lines fired unsuccessfully by the Rocket Brigade. Bowman V. Spragg was swept overboard, but was recovered to the lifeboat. A coble which had been launched from Redcar also got tangled in the cables, and was capsized. Three of the seven man crew of the coble were lost. Eventually, the lifeboat managed to get alongside, and the nine crewmen of the trawler were rescued.

The station would be closed in 1917, due to the lack of available crew, with so many serving in the forces in World War I. It was reopened again in 1919, when 20 men came forward to join the crew, but just three years later, on 22 March 1922, Mary Batger would launch for the last time, rescuing the crew of three from the coble Ever True of Skinningrove.

Due to the placement of motor-lifeboats at both Teesmouth and Whitby, and sufficient other cover from the lifeboat stations at Redcar and Staithes and Runswick, the Saltburn lifeboat was withdrawn, and the station was closed in 1922.

The lifeboat Mary Batger (ON 410) was sold in 1923, and was last reported as the fishing boat Barbimaris in Malta in 1954. The station building was used by the coastguard for a brief period, but was demolished for a road-widening scheme by 1927.

== Station honours ==
The following are awards made at Salburn.

- The Thanks of the Institution inscribed on Vellum

T. G. Pearson, Honorary Secretary – 1880

== Saltburn lifeboats ==
ON (Note: ON is the RNLI's Official Number of the boat.)	Name	Built	On station	Class	Comments
Pre-226	Unnamed	1849	1849–1869	30-foot North Country	(Note: 30-foot x 10-foot (10-oared) North Country non-self-righting lifeboat, provided from RNLI funds, costing £160.); Renamed Appleyard in 1869
Pre-226	Appleyard	1849	1869–1878	30-foot North Country	Renamed Thomas and Isabella Firbank of Kingston-upon-Hull in 1878.
Pre-226	Thomas and Isabella Firbank of Kingston-upon-Hull	1849	1878–1880	30-foot North Country	
215	Charles and Ann	1880	1880–1897	34-foot Self-righting (P&S)	(Note: 34-foot x 8-foot 3in (10-oared) self-righting (P&S) lifeboat, gift of Mrs Townend of Tewkesbury, built by Woolfe of Shadwell, London, costing £363.)
410	Mary Batger	1897	1897–1917	34-foot Self-righting (P&S)	(Note: 34-foot x 8-foot 3in (10-oared) self-righting (P&S) lifeboat, legacy of Mrs M. Scales of Armley, Leeds, built by Chambers and Colby of Lowestoft, costing £532.)
Station Closed 1917–1919
410	Mary Batger	1897	1919–1922	34-foot Self-righting (P&S)	

Pre ON numbers are unofficial numbers used by the Lifeboat Enthusiast Society to reference early lifeboats not included on the official RNLI list.

== See also ==
- List of RNLI stations
- List of former RNLI stations
- Royal National Lifeboat Institution lifeboats
