= Scarborough Lifeboat Station =

RNLI Lifeboat station in North Yorkshire, England

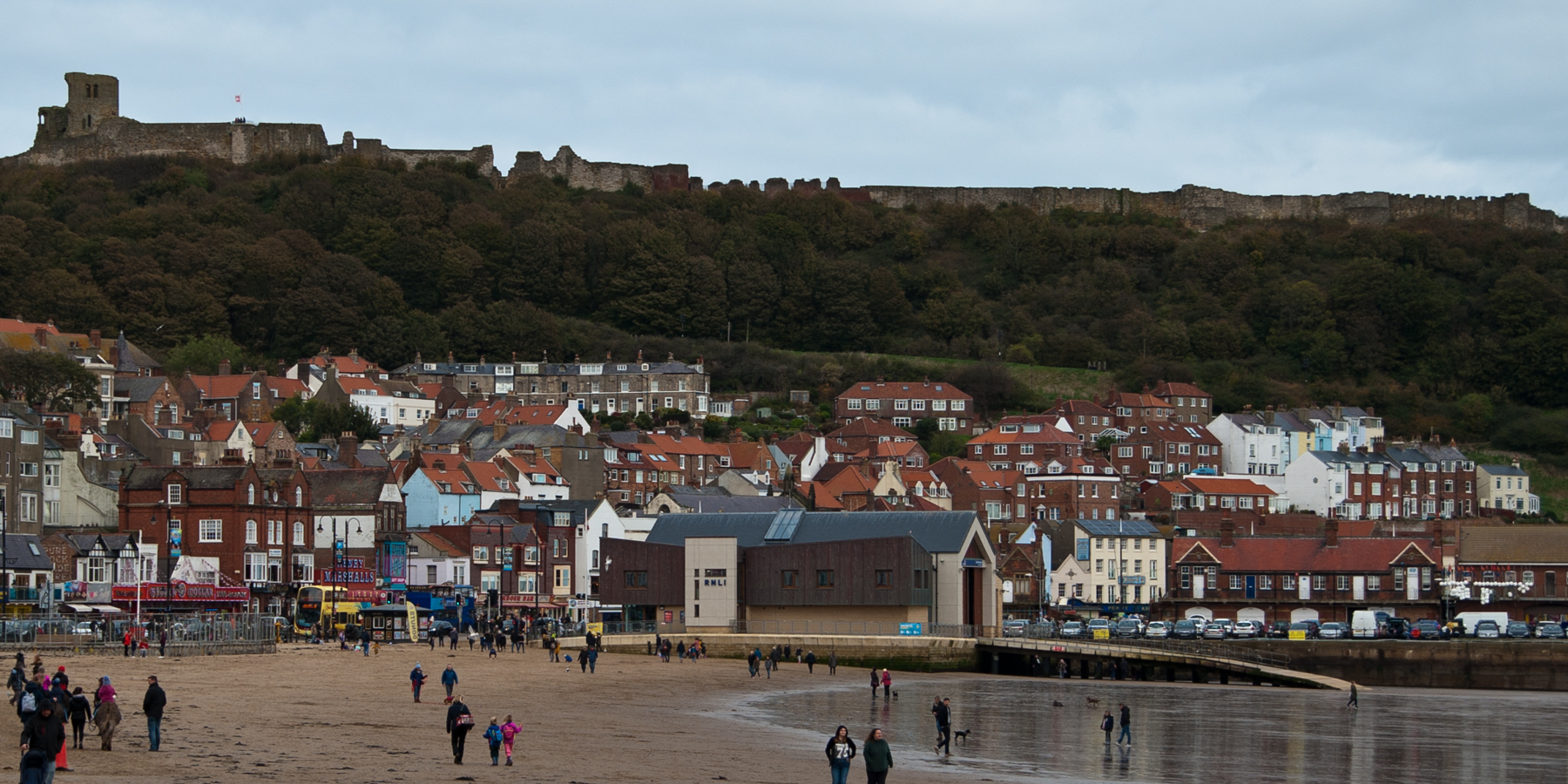
- Scarborough RNLI station showing slipway

- Location within North Yorkshire

General information
- Type: RNLI Lifeboat Station
- Location: West Pier, Foreshore Road, Scarborough, North Yorkshire, YO11 1PB, England
- Coordinates: 54.2833°N 0.3930°W
- Opened: 1801; 1861 RNLI
- Owner: Royal National Lifeboat Institution

Website
- Scarborough RNLI Lifeboat Station

Scarborough Lifeboat Station is located at West Pier on Foreshore Road in Scarborough, a seaside resort and port on the east coast of North Yorkshire, England.

A lifeboat was established at Scarborough in 1801, which makes it the third oldest operational lifeboat station in the United Kingdom (after Montrose and Sunderland). Management of the station was transferred to the Royal National Lifeboat Institution (RNLI) in 1861.

The station currently operates 13-15 Frederick William Plaxton (ON 1322), a Shannon-class All-weather lifeboat, on station since 2016, and the John Wesley Hillard IV (D-856), an Inshore D-class lifeboat, on station since 2021.

== History ==
The first lifeboat in Scarborough was instituted by public donation costing just over £212. and saw its first launch in November 1801, when it went to the aid of a stricken vessel named Aurora in Scarborough Bay. The first boat was actually built in Scarborough to a design by Henry Greathead, who had designed and built a boat for Whitby and Redcar lifeboat stations.

A replacement boat was built and supplied to the rescue crews in the town in 1823. The first lifeboat station was at the junction of Foreshore Road and Valley Road in the town. In 1821, the station was relocated near to its present site by the West Pier in Scarborough Harbour, however it was on the landward side of Foreshore Road.

At a meeting of the RNLI committee of management on Thursday 4 April 1861, in reference to a letter from John Woodall of Scarborough, and with copies of resolutions, it was decided to accept the request of the Scarborough Lifeboat Committee, who had unanimously agreed to join the Institution, and that a new lifeboat and carriage were to be provided to Scarborough.

The station was renovated, and Amelia, a new 32-foot (9.8 m) Peake-class self-righting 'Pulling and Sailing' (P&S) lifeboat, one with both sails and (10) oars, arrived in Scarborough on 26 September 1861.

Just 5 weeks later, on 2 November 1861, the Amelia was wrecked, on its first service, after being launched to the aid of the schooner Coupland. (See Notable launches). Within a week, a replacement lifeboat was dispatched to Scarborough. Formerly the Royal Thames Yacht Club at Walmer, the boat had been at the boat-builders to be lengthened. Funded from the gift of Mrs Cockroft of Scarborough, the lifeboat was named Mary on arrival in Scarborough.

In the early 1870s, two cast-iron pillar collection boxes were erected to aid with fundraising, one at the Old Cliff, next to the gates to the Spa Bridge, near the Grand Hotel, and a second one, outside the Crown Hotel on The Esplanade.

In 1914, the Scarborough lifeboat Queensbury (ON 111) was launched to assist in the rescue of the SS Rohilla off the coast at Whitby. Like many other lifeboats used in the rescue, she could not get near to the Rohilla because of the swell.

In 1940, a new lifeboat station was built next to the West Pier; the old lifeboat house was later converted into an amusement arcade on the seafront. The 1940 lifeboat house had to be adapted for the larger Mersey-class lifeboat Fanny Victoria Wilkinson and Frank Stubbs in 1991, which involved widening and heightening the door.

A new lifeboat station was opened in 2016, which had been designed by the York architectural firm of Brierley Groom. Approval for the new £3 million building was granted by the borough council in 2014.

In 2018, the coxswain of the crew was dismissed; the RNLI released a statement that he had organised an operational training exercise without proper authority. The former coxswain stated that he had "the blessing and clearance of the lifeboat operations manager and several others". After a groundswell of support for the sacked individual, the RNLI later released a further statement detailing their decision to stand down the coxswain citing the lack of trained professionals on the boat when she was put to sea in rough weather.

== Notable launches ==
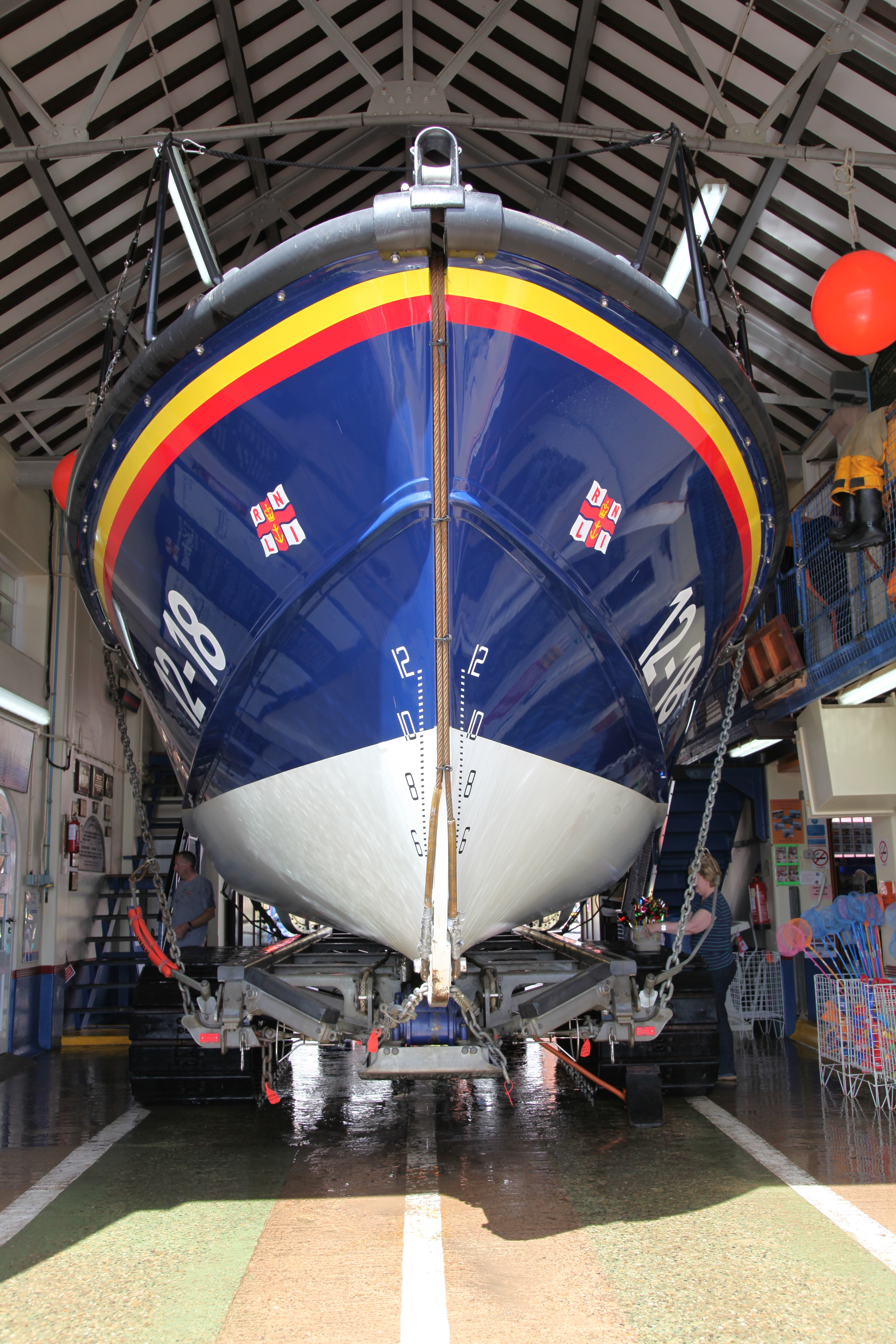
The Mersey-class lifeboat 12-18 Fanny Victoria Wilkinson and Frank Stubbs (ON 1175) in Scarborough's old station, 2013.

- 17 February 1836 – The crew launched to help a sloop named John as it was trying to enter the harbour area at Scarborough to shelter from the storm. As the lifeboat came close to the sloop, it capsized and ten of her crew were washed out to sea on a strong ebb tide. One crew member managed to get back onto the boat and three others were underneath the boat, having secured themselves to the boat to prevent the same fate that had befallen ten of their comrades. The three used the 'conduiting pipes' (used to drain seawater out of the boat) set into the boat to allow them to breathe. A human chain was formed of spectators who eventually managed to rescue the four men from the sea.
- 2 November 1861 – the crew launched their new life boat Amelia, after a storm besieged the east coast. Many ships were trying to make port in Scarborough, and one, the Coupland, missed the harbour entrance and was driven ashore in the South Bay, near the Spa Theatre. In the rough conditions, the lifeboat pitched violently, crashing against the sea-wall, first throwing the Coxswain overboard, followed by several members of the crew. Two lifeboat men died, along with three members of the public, including Lord Charles Beauclerk, who had been spectators on the shore, but had waded into the water to help. The crew of the Coupland, which had been carrying a cargo of granite, had been relatively safe once their vessel washed ashore, and were rescued by the Rocket Brigade. The lifeboat was a complete wreck. It is estimated that 24 lives were lost in the area during the storm.
- 9 December 1951 – the Dutch vessel Westkust ran into trouble some 26 nautical miles (48 km; 30 mi) off the coast of Scarborough. The ECJR was launched at 11:30, but due to the heavy seas, she took over seven hours to reach the Westkust. As the lifeboat came alongside the sinking ship, two of the lifeboatmen jumped onto the Westkust to assess the situation, whilst the crew of the Westkust got into the lifeboat. As the two craft were side by side, they were being buffeted together and apart by the strong swell of the sea. One lifeboat man managed to jump back into the lifeboat, but a freak wave wrenched the two ships apart, leaving Bowman Frank Dalton clinging to the rails of the Westkust. The swell then pushed the two boats together again, and crushed the lifeboatman between them. He fell into the lifeboat with a crushed pelvis and died of his injuries before they reached the port of Bridlington.
- 8 December 1954 – whilst escorting ships into harbour during a storm, the lifeboat overturned in the South Bay at Scarborough. Three crew members died.

== Station honours ==
The following are awards made at Scarborough

- RNIPLS Silver Medal
  James Fowler, Master Mariner – 1824
  Smith Tindall, Master Mariner – 1824
  Thomas Claybourn, Coxswain – 1828
- RNLI Silver Medal
  Henry Wyrill, Boatman – 1857
  Lord Charles Beauclerk – 1861 (post.)
  William Tindall – 1861 (post.)
  John Iles – 1861 (post.)
  Michael Hick, Ship Owner – 1861
  Joseph Rutter, Eng. Superintendent, Scarborough Railway Station – 1861
  Oliver Sarony, Photographic Artist – 1861
  (all members of the public)
  John Owston, Coxswain – 1880
  William Sheader, Coxswain – 1970
- RNLI Bronze Medal
  John Nicholas Sheader, Coxswain – 1952
  Thomas Jenkinson Mainprize, Assistant Motor Mechanic – 1952
  Frank Dalton, Bowman – 1952 (post.)
  Thomas Rowley, Acting Coxswain – 1973
  Rudi Barman, Helm – 2015
- The Maud Smith Award 1969
  (for the bravest act of lifesaving during the year by a member of a lifeboat crew)
  awarded jointly to:
  William Sheader, Coxswain of Scarborough Lifeboat – 1970
  (and Eric Offer, Coxswain of Dun Laoghaire Lifeboat – 1970)
- The Thanks of the Institution inscribed on Vellum
  Samuel Rawling – 1861
  Matthew Byfield – 1861
  William Bland – 1861
  The Scarborough Lifeboat Crew – 1970
  Richard Constantine, Coxswain/Mechanic – 1994
- A Framed Letter of Thanks signed by the Chairman of the Institution
  Each member of the Scarborough Lifeboat crew – 1966
  C. J. Bean, – 1968
  R. Swalwell – 1968
  Paul Stonehouse, Helm – 1995
  Craig Burnett, crew member – 2015
  Adam Beston, crew member – 2015
- Letters of thanks from the operations director
  Dr Peter Billingsley – 2015
  Jason Hedges – 2015
- Two silver mounted pipes presented by The Prince of Wales
  John Owston, Coxswain – 1902
- Member, Order of the British Empire (MBE)
  Stuart Edwin Ogden, Coxswain – 1994QBH
  Richard Francis Constantine, Former Coxswain/Mechanic – 2003QBH
- British Empire Medal
  Donna Loveland – 2020QBH
  John Percy Porter, Visits Officer, Water Safety Advisor and Fundraiser – 2024KBH

== Roll of honour ==
In memory of those lost at Scarborough.

- Lost when the lifeboat capsized, on service to the sloop John and Agnes of Aberdeen, 17 February 1836.

J. Allen
T. Boyes
T. Cross
J. O. Dale
J. Clayburn

J. Day
R. Marchman
J. Maw
T. Walker
J. Waugh

- Lifeboat Amelia, on service to the schooner Coupland, 2 November 1861
  Lord Charles Beauclerk
  Thomas Brewster
  John Burton
  William Tindall
  John Iles
- Crushed between the lifeboat E. C. J. R. (ON 879) and the vessel Westkust, 9 December 1951
  Frank Dalton, Bowman (57)
- Lost when lifeboat E. C. J. R. (ON 879) capsized whilst searching for fishing boats, 8 December 1954.
  John 'Jack' Nicholas Sheader, Coxswain (63)
  John. H. Cammish, Second Coxswain (55)
  Francis Bayes, Signalman (29)

== Scarborough lifeboats ==
=== Scarborough lifeboat committee lifeboats ===
| ON (Note: ON is the RNLI's Official Number of the boat.) | Name | Built | On station | Class | Comments |
|---|---|---|---|---|---|
| – | Unknown | 1801 | 1801–1823 | 27-foot 6in North Country | (Note: 27-foot 6in x 10-foot (10-oared) North Country non-self-righting lifeboat, funded by local subscription and a gift from Lloyd's of London, built by Charles Smith of Scarborough, costing £147.) |
| – | Unknown | 1823 | 1823–c.1852 | 28-foot North Country | (Note: 28-foot x 9-foot (10-oared) North Country non-self-righting lifeboat, funded by local subscription and a gift from Lloyd's of London, built by Skelton of Scarborough, costing £85.) |
| Pre-252 | Unnamed | 1852 | 1852–1861 | 25-foot Peake Self-righting (P&S) | (Note: 25-foot x 9-foot (10-oared) Peake-class self-righting lifeboat, built by Edmonds of Scarborough.); This was the first self-righting lifeboat to serve at Scarborough. |

Pre ON numbers are unofficial numbers used by the Lifeboat Enthusiasts' Society to reference early lifeboats not included on the official RNLI list.

=== RNLI Pulling and Sailing (P&S) lifeboats ===
| ON | Name | Built | On station | Class | Comments |
|---|---|---|---|---|---|
| Pre-379 | Amelia | 1860 | 1861 | 32-foot Peake Self-righting (P&S) | (Note: 32-foot x 7-foot 11in (10-oared) Peake-class self-righting (P&S) lifeboat, gift of Mr W. Banting of London, built by Forrestt of Limehouse, London, costing £178.); Wrecked in the storm of 2 December 1861. |
| Pre-300 | Mary | 1856 | 1861–1872 | 33-foot Peake Self-righting (P&S) | (Note: 32-foot x 8-foot 2in (10-oared) Peake-class self-righting (P&S) lifeboat, gift of Mrs Cockroft of Scarborough, built by Forrestt of Limehouse, London, costing £169.); Previously 29-foot 5in lifeboat Royal Thames Yacht Club at Walmer, lengthened in 1861. |
| Pre-570 | Lady Leigh | 1872 | 1872–1887 | 35-foot Self-righting (P&S) | (Note: 35-foot x 9-foot (10-oared) self-righting (P&S) lifeboat, gift of the Freemasons or Warwickshire, built by Forrestt of Limehouse, London, costing £339.) |
| 111 | Queensbury | 1887 | 1887–1895 | 37-foot Self-righting (P&S) | (Note: 37-foot x 8-foot (12-oared) self-righting (P&S) lifeboat, gift of Foster Ltd of Queensbury, built by Forrestt of Limehouse, London, costing £442.) |
| 6 | Queensbury | 1884 | 1895–1901 | 34-foot 4in Self-righting (P&S) | (Note: 37-foot x 8-foot (12-oared) self-righting (P&S) lifeboat, gift of Col. Foster of Queensbury, built by Woolfe of Shadwell, London, costing £349 when new.); Previously Thomas and Isabella Firbank at Middlesbrough |
| 344 | Edward and Lucille | 1892 | 1901–1902 | 34-foot Self-righting (P&S) | (Note: 34-foot x 8-foot (10-oared) self-righting (P&S) lifeboat, legacy of Miss L. Collinson of London, built by Chambers and Colby of Lowestoft, costing £386 when new.); Previously at Rye |
| 484 | Queensbury | 1901 | 1902–1918 | 35-foot Self-righting (P&S) | (Note: 34-foot x 8-foot (10-oared) self-righting (P&S) lifeboat, gift of Foster Ltd of Queensbury, built by Thames Ironworks, costing £729.) |
| 574 | Brothers Brickwood | 1907 | 1918–1924 | 35-foot Self-righting (P&S) | (Note: 35-foot x 8-foot 6in (10-oared) self-righting (P&S) lifeboat, legacy of Mr E. D. Brickwood of Boscombe, built by Thames Ironworks, costing £871 when new.); Previously at Brighstone Grange |

=== All-weather lifeboats ===
| ON | Op. No. (Note: Op. No. is the RNLI's Operational Number of the boat carried on the hull.) | Name | Built | On station | Class | Comments |
|---|---|---|---|---|---|---|
| 683 | – | Herbert Joy | 1923 | 1924–1931 | 35-foot Self-righting (Single Motor) | Donated by Alex Joy and named after his brother who drowned in the bay at Scarborough. |
| 742 | – | Herbert Joy II | 1931 | 1931–1951 | 35ft 6in Self-righting motor | |
| 879 | – | E. C. J. R. | 1950 | 1951–1956 | 35ft 6in Self-righting motor | |
| 792 | – | Annie, Ronald and Isabella Forrest | 1936 | 1956–1958 | Liverpool | |
| 942 | 37-01 | J. G. Graves of Sheffield | 1958 | 1958–1978 | Oakley | The prototype Oakley Class lifeboat. |
| 979 | 37-12 | Amelia | 1964 | 1978–1991 | Oakley | |
| 1175 | 12-18 | Fanny Victoria Wilkinson and Frank Stubbs | 1991 | 1991–2016 | Mersey | Sold to the Chilean rescue service in 2018 and works out of Valparaíso, 75 miles (121 km) to the north west of the capital, Santiago. |
| 1322 | 13-15 | Frederick William Plaxton | 2016 | 2016– | Shannon | Officially unveiled by the Duke of Kent in April 2017 |

=== Inshore lifeboats ===
| Op. No. | Name | On station | Class | Comments |
|---|---|---|---|---|
| D-68 | Unnamed | 1965 | D-class (Dunlop) | |
| D-85 | Unnamed | 1966–1967 | D-class (RFD PB16) | |
| D-20 | Unnamed | 1967 | D-class (RFD PB16) | |
| D-40 | Unnamed | 1968–1969 | D-class (RFD PB16) | |
| D-183 | The Young People of Scarborough | 1970–1984 | D-class (RFD PB16) | |
| D-304 | Unnamed | 1984–1992 | D-class (RFD PB16) | |
| D-434 | John Wesley Hillard | 1992–2001 | D-class (EA16) | |
| D-560 | John Wesley Hillard II | 2001–2009 | D-class (EA16) | |
| D-724 | John Wesley Hillard III | 2009–2021 | D-class (IB1) | |
| D-856 | John Wesley Hillard IV | 2021– | D-class (IB1) | |

=== Launch and recovery tractors ===
| Op. No. | Reg. No. | Type | On station | Comments |
|---|---|---|---|---|
| T5 | IJ 3424 | Clayton | 1947–1950 | |
| T25 | UW 3881 | FWD Co. | 1949–1955 | |
| T42 | JXR 933 | Case LA | 1955–1958 | |
| T64 | PXF 575 | Fowler Challenger III | 1958–1967 | |
| T62 | PLA 698 | Fowler Challenger III | 1967–1976 | |
| T61 | PLA 561 | Fowler Challenger III | 1976–1984 | |
| T63 | PXF 163 | Fowler Challenger III | 1984–1988 | |
| T106 | F760 BUJ | Talus MB-H Crawler | 1988–2001 | |
| T103 | E589 WAW | Talus MB-H Crawler | 2001–2015 | |
| SC-T10 | HF65 HPJ | SLARS (Clayton) | 2016– | The Cairns |

== See also ==
- List of RNLI stations
- List of former RNLI stations
- Royal National Lifeboat Institution lifeboats
