= Redcar Lifeboat Station =

RNLI Lifeboat station in North Yorkshire, England

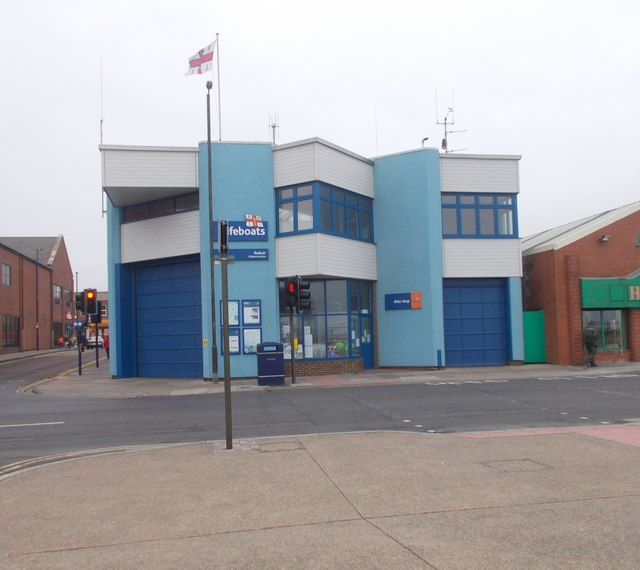
- Redcar Lifeboat Station

- Location within North Yorkshire

General information
- Type: RNLI Lifeboat Station
- Location: 43 Esplanade, Redcar, North Yorkshire, TS10 3AG, England
- Coordinates: 54.6185°N 1.0637°W
- Opened: 1802
- Owner: Royal National Lifeboat Institution

Website
- Redcar RNLI Lifeboat Station

Redcar Lifeboat Station is located on The Esplanade at Redcar, a town on the northern coast of Yorkshire, historically North Yorkshire, now Redcar and Cleveland.

A lifeboat was first placed at Redcar in 1802. The lifeboat was operated by the Tees Bay Lifeboat and Shipwreck Society (TBLSS) from 1825. Management of the station was transferred to the Royal National Lifeboat Institution (RNLI) in 1858. A second independent lifeboat operated at Redcar between 1877 and ~1898.

The station currently operated two Inshore Lifeboats (ILB); the B-class (Atlantic 85) Leicester Challenge III (B-858), on station since 2012, and a smaller D-class (IB1) Eileen May Loach-Thomas (D-786), on station since 2015.

== History ==
There is much documented detail about the origins of the Redcar lifeboat. Many reports are conflicting, with different dates (Note: Some sources claim the boat was built in 1800 and was first active at Spurn Point (Humber) before being sent to Redcar in 1802. Humber Lifeboat Station is listed as being in use by 1810, but most sources claim the boat was sent direct from Henry Greathead to Redcar.) and incorrect names. It is claimed that the cost of the lifeboat (reported as both £100 and £200) was raised by local fishermen or the local population, but either would seem an impossible amount in the early 19th century, as in 1802, Redcar was a small fishing hamlet consisting of two rows of terraced houses.

What is known, is that a lifeboat, to be operated by local fishermen, locally named as Lifeboat, and initially costing £200, was constructed of 20-year-old matured oak by Henry Greathead of South Shields, and placed at Redcar in 1802.

With records showing that the site and lifeboat house were provided by landowner Lieutenant-Colonel Lawrence Dundas of Marske Hall, MP for Richmond (Yorks), it is more likely that he also furnished most, if not all, of the cost of the lifeboat.

See Main Article : Zetland (lifeboat)

In the early days of the lifeboat station, a drummer boy would alert the lifeboat crew to a launch by playing Come Along, Brave Boys, Come Along. From 1825, the boat was operated by the Tees Bay Lifeboat and Shipwreck Society (TBLSS).

On 25 December 1835, the lifeboat was called to the aid of the brig Caroline, driven ashore at Coatham. Attempting to throw a line to the vessel, Bowman William Guy was washed overboard, and drowned.

It is known that Redcar's Lifeboat was later named Zetland, in honour of the Lord of the Manor, Lawrence Dundas. The date is unknown, but it is likely it was in 1838 or 1839. It may have been on the occasion of the coronation of Queen Victoria in 1838, when Lawrence Dundas was created 1st "Earl of Zetland". On the other hand, it may have been after the death of Dundas, who died the following year in 1839.

At the request of the TBLSS, and agreed at the meeting of the RNLI committee of management on 5 August 1858, the three stations of the TBLSS, Middlesbrough, Saltburn and Redcar, were transferred to the management of the RNLI. Each station was visited prior to the transfer by Capt. John Ward, RNLI Inspector of Lifeboats.

The Zetland served for six more years, before being damaged, and withdrawn from service in 1864. During her time on service, she had saved approximately 500 lives. The boat was scheduled to be broken up. However, as a much loved and trusted boat, representation was made for the Zetland to be saved and retained, to which the RNLI agreed, on condition that it not be used in competition with their replacement boat. Repairs to the Zetland to a seaworthy state were carried out in 1865, at the expense of Lord Zetland and Mr H. W. Yeoman.

A new 33-foot self-righting 'Pulling and Sailing' (P&S) lifeboat, one with sails and (10) oars, was built of mahogany, by Forrestt of Limehouse, London, at a cost of £252-6s. A transporting carriage was also supplied, costing a further £101-3s. Both boat and carriage were conveyed to Redcar free of charge by the Great Northern and North Eastern railway companies. A sum of £300 for the cost of the lifeboat was gifted to the Institution by John Crossley and Sons, carpet manufacturers of Halifax, West Yorkshire, and the boat was duly named Crossley.

The Crossley was on station at Redcar for just three years. Having been used to the 30-foot open lifeboat, a 33-foot lifeboat with self-righting buoyancy airboxes at each end was found to be too small. Ultimately, the crew refused to use the boat. The lifeboat was transferred to Middlesbrough, and Redcar would receive the larger 36-foot lifeboat Burton-on-Trent in 1867.

Many more lifeboats were placed at Redcar. The first motor-powered lifeboat, Louisa Polden (ON 737) arrived on station in 1931, more than 20-years after the first motor lifeboats were introduced.

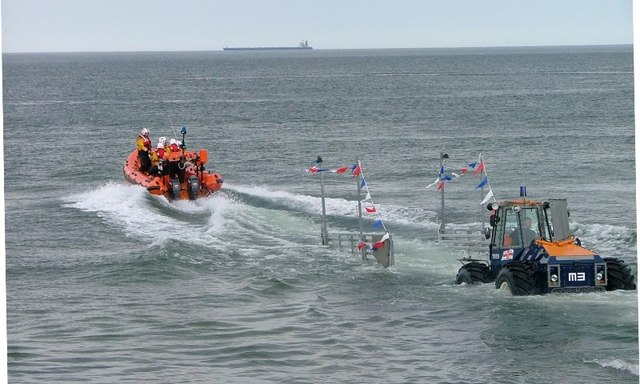
Redcar Lifeboat being launched on Lifeboat Day

In response to an increasing amount of water-based leisure activity, in 1963, the RNLI began trials of small fast Inshore lifeboats, placed at various locations around the country. These were easily launched with just a few people, ideal to respond quickly to local emergencies. This quickly proved to be very successful. In 1963, there were 226 rescues or attempted rescues in the summer months, as a result of which 225 lives were saved. Redcar was one of the first stations to receive the new D-class (RFD PB16) Inshore Lifeboat, (D-5), operating alongside the All-weather boat.

With All-weather lifeboats at Teesmouth, Hartlepool and Whitby, the All-weather lifeboat at Redcar was withdrawn in 1986, and replaced with the B-class (Atlantic 21) Inshore lifeboat, Wildenrath Whizzer (B-520).

== Independent lifeboat ==
In 1875, at the annual grand meeting of the United Order of Free Gardeners held at Newcastle-upon-Tyne, it was resolved raise the funds, thought to amount to £600, for the provision of a Lifeboat, for the RNLI. The annual meeting in West Bromwich the following year confirmed that the intended recipients would be Redcar. The reasons behind the choice of Redcar is not clear, but after negotiations, it was decided to commission a lifeboat that was suited to the desires of the Redcar crew, in the style of the much favoured Zetland, and not a self-righting pulling and sailing lifeboat, as required and demanded by the RNLI.

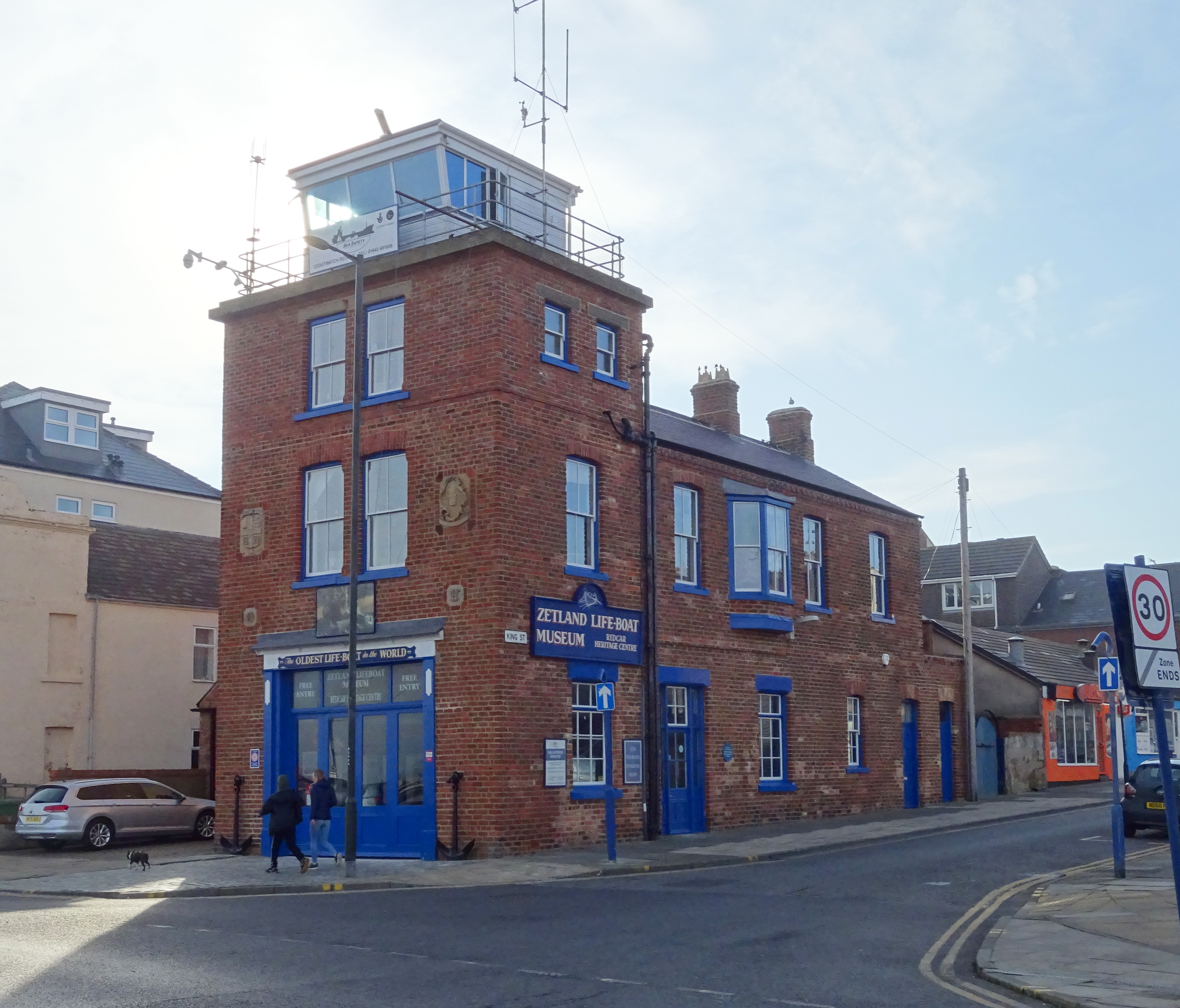
1877 Independent boathouse, now Zetland Lifeboat Museum and Redcar Heritage Centre

The boat would therefore not replace the existing RNLI lifeboat at Redcar, and would then also require the construction of a new boathouse. The building would also provide accommodation for the coxswain, and other crew facilities, and cost a further £700. A contribution of £100 was received from philanthropist Mrs Emma Dawson, of Weston Hall, Otley, who was well-known for her support of worthwhile causes in the town.

The inauguration was set for Monday 30 July 1877, and was attended by an estimated crowd of 20,000 people, who had travelled by train and steamer to the town. At noon, a procession assembled on Coatham Pier, and set off to the new lifeboat house on The Esplanade. It didn't get far, before a wheel on the new carriage broke, leaving the boat stranded. The procession continued, without the boat, while hasty arrangements were made to find a replacement carriage. After a long delay, the lifeboat arrived at the new boathouse, and the ceremony continued.

Mrs Dawson had been asked to perform the naming ceremony, and breaking a bottle of wine against the boat, said "From the bottom of my heart I wish your boat every success, and christen it “The United Free Gardeners." In her honour, the boat would become known locally as Emma. The lifeboat operated until 1898, her last service being to the barque Birger of Finland.

== Boathouses ==
In 1910, the RNLI built a new lifeboat house on the promenade to house Fifi and Charles (ON 577). This building was in turn demolished in the early 1970s, after a new lifeboat station was constructed next door. In 1970, the County Borough of Teesside Council built a new lifeboat station for the RNLI on the seafront at Redcar. The site is the same one occupied by the first Redcar lifeboat. The exterior of the RNLI lifeboat station was refurbished in 2014.

In 1907, after being stored outside, and in a number of locations, the now vacant Independent boathouse was able to provide a permanent home for the Zetland. The building, now grade II listed, was purchased by the RNLI in 1936. As of 2025, the building is still the home of the Zetland lifeboat, the oldest surviving lifeboat in the world, and houses the Zetland Lifeboat Museum and Redcar Heritage Centre.

Of over 1000 vessels listed on The National Historical Ships Register, 200 are regarded to be of "pre-eminent National or Regional significance". Of these, only six are older than the Zetland, which sits alongside vessels such as Mary Rose, HMS Victory, HMS Warrior (1860), HMS Trincomalee and Cutty Sark. The RNLI withdrew from operating the museum in 2015, and the centre is now operated independently, run by volunteers, and funded entirely by visitor donations.

== Notable incidents ==
- 7 September 1826 - The whaling shipEsk, returning to her home port of Whitby, was stranded on the rocks, just outside Marske-by-the-Sea. The Redcar lifeboat attended the wreck, but only three out of a crew of twenty-nine were saved.
- 25 December 1836 - The Redcar lifeboat was launched on Christmas Day to help a Dutch collier Caroline as she was foundering in heavy seas. Lifeboat bowman William Guy was washed overboard whilst trying to throw a line to one of the Caroline's lifeboats. Neither the crewman nor the ten crew of the collier Caroline survived. The death of the lifeboat crewman remains the only death of a lifeboat crew member to have occurred at Redcar (although other deaths associated with launching have occurred [see below]).
- 29 October 1880 - The Zetland was brought out of retirement to rescue the crew of the brig, Luna, after all other lifeboats were out of action due to having also rescued stricken crews on the same day. Zetland rescued the seven men from the Luna.
- 18–22 October 1898 - The barque Birger of Finland was on passage from Barcelona to Finland, carrying a consignment of salt. Approaching the coast of Norway, a fierce storm struck the North Sea which was to last five days. The south-easterly winds blew her towards Britain and her captain tried to make port first at Grimsby, but when this proved difficult, a decision was made to head for Newcastle upon Tyne. As she passed up alongside the Yorkshire Coast, the lifeboats and rockets were prepared at Scarborough, Robin Hood's Bay, Whitby, Runswick and Saltburn. Each time, the stricken vessel passed by, without being able to make port. By the time of her arrival in Redcar on 22 October, she was struggling against the storm and taking on significant amounts of water. She was wrecked on the rocks outside of Redcar and both lifeboats, Brothers and Emma, were launched to help rescue the men. The lifeboat crews could not find anybody and the Birger's sails collapsed into the boat. Three men made it to the pier at Coatham, but of those three, only one survived the waves, hauled up onto the pier by the locals who had been watching the rescue. Another man was washed ashore; 13 other sailors drowned. The wreck of the ship then cut Coatham Pier in half.
- 27 December 1906 - The steamship Awa Maru of Tokyo became stuck on Westcar reef outside Redcar. The lifeboat Brothers (ON 7) was launched and had a successful initial rescue, but on a second try, the lifeboat had its back broken on the rocks. Despite this, they tried again only for the lifeboat's carriage to become embedded in the soft sand. The remainder of the crew of the Awa Maru managed to get ashore in their own lifeboats later. The ship had to be blasted away from the rocks, but she was successfully re-floated.
- 21 January 1921 - The Redcar lifeboat Fifi and Charles (ON 577) was sent out to effect a rescue of the collier Aphrodite of Piraeus, Greece, aground just to the east of Redcar. Usually, the lifeboat was launched by horses but none were available, so a contingent of mostly women hauled the boat down to the shoreline. During the launch, Margaret Emmans was crushed to death under the wheels of the lifeboat carriage. This led to the construction of a slipway onto the beach opposite the lifeboathouse.

== Station honours ==
The following are awards made at Redcar.

- RNIPLS Gold Medal
  Lt. Richard Elsworthy Pym, RN, Chief Officer, H.M. Coastguard, Whitby – 1829
- RNLI Silver Medal
  Robert Shieldon, Coxswain – 1857
- RNLI Bronze Medal
  Peter Hodge, Helm – 1992
- The Walter and Elizabeth Groombridge Award 2003
  (for the outstanding inshore lifeboat rescue of the year)
  Mark Reeves, Helm – 2004
- The Thanks of the Institution inscribed on Vellum
  Rodney J. Thompson, Helm – 1990
  Peter Hodge, crew member – 1990
  Barry Wheater, crew member – 1992
  Mark Reeves, crew member – 1992
  Derek Robinson, crew member – 1992
  Mark Reeves, Helm – 2004
  Michael Picknett, Helm – 2012
- A Framed Letter of Thanks signed by the Chairman of the Institution
  Michael Picknett, Helm – 1995
  Michael Hoyle, crew member – 1995
  Barry Knaggs, crew member – 1995
  Gordon Young, crew member – 1995
  Mark Reeves, Helm – 1999
  Tony Wild, crew member – 1999
  Derek Robinson, crew member – 1999
  Mark Reeves, crew member – 2012
  Barry Knaggs, crew member – 2012
- Member, Order of the British Empire (MBE)
  Vera Robinson – 1971
- British Empire Medal
  Michael Picknett – 2013

== Roll of honour ==
In memory of those lost whilst serving at Redcar.

- Washed out of the lifeboat and drowned, whilst on service to the brig Caroline, 25 December 1836.
  William Guy, Bowman
- Lost when their fishing coble capsized, whilst attempting to assist the Saltburn lifeboat with the rescue of the crew of the steam trawler Honoria at Marske-by-the-Sea, 9 January 1901.
  Richard Picknett, fisherman (60)
  John Picknett, fisherman (24)
  Edmund Picknett, fisherman (21)
- Died after being knocked down by the lifeboat carriage during launch, 21 January 1921.
  Margaret Emmans, shore helper (28)

== Redcar lifeboats ==
=== Pulling and Sailing lifeboats ===
ON (Note: ON is the RNLI's Official Number of the boat.)	Name	Built	On station	Class	Comments
Pre-017	Lifeboat	1802	1802–1839*	30-foot Greathead	(Note: 30-foot x 8-foot (10-oared) lifeboat, built by Henry Greathead of South Shields, costing £200.); Named Zetland(*-likely date)
Pre-017	Zetland	1802	1839*–1864	30-foot Greathead	(*-likely date)
Pre-418	Crossley	1864	1864–1867	33-foot Peake Self-righting (P&S)	(Note: 33-foot x 8foot 2in (10-oared) lifeboat, gift of John Crossley & Sons, Halifax, built by Forrestt of Limehouse, London, costing £256.)
Pre-507	Burton-on-Trent	1867	1867–1884	36-foot Self-righting (P&S)	(Note: 36-foot x 9-foot 6in (10-oared) self-righting (P&S) lifeboat, gift of the Burton-on-Trent LB fund, built by Forrestt of Limehouse, London, costing £345.)
7	Brothers	1884	1884–1907	34-foot Self-righting (P&S)	(Note: 34-foot 2in x 8-foot 1in (10-oared) self-righting (P&S) lifeboat, gift of Four Ladies, via Mrs Polson of Clevedon, built by Woolfe of Shadwell, London, costing £348.); Damaged whilst attempting to rescue the crew of the Awa Maru in December 1906.
577	Fifi and Charles	1907	1907–1931	35-foot Self-righting (P&S)	(Note: 35-foot x 8-foot 3in (10-oared) self-righting (P&S) lifeboat, legacy of Mr C. C. Ashley of Menton, France, built by Thames Ironworks of Blackwall, London, costing £880.)

Pre ON numbers are unofficial numbers used by the Lifeboat Enthusiasts' Society to reference early lifeboats not included on the official RNLI list.

=== Independent lifeboat ===
Name	Built	On station	Class	Comments
The United Free Gardeners	1877	1877–1898	33-foot lifeboat	(Note: 33-foot x 11-foot 6in (10-oared) lifeboat, built by Jas. Jackson of South Shields.); Locally known as Emma

Independent Lifeboat withdrawn ~1898

=== Motor lifeboats ===
ON	Op. No. (Note: Op. No. is the RNLI's Operational Number of the boat carried on the hull.)	Name	Built	On station	Class	Comments
737	–	Louisa Polden	1931	1931–1951	35ft 6in Self-righting motor	The first motorboat to serve at Redcar
881	–	City of Leeds	1951	1951–1965	35ft 6in Self-righting motor	
892	–	Aguila Wren	1951	1965–1972	Liverpool	Previously at Aberystwyth. Under restoration at Donaghadee (December 2024).
975	37-08	Sir James Knott	1963	1972–1986	Oakley	Previously at Cullercoats. On display (limited access) at Kirkleatham Old Hall Museum, Redcar

All-weather lifeboat withdrawn, 1986

=== Inshore lifeboats ===
==== D-Class ====
Op. No.	Name	On station	Class	Comments
D-5	Unnamed	1963	D-class (RFD PB16)	
D-6	Unnamed	1963	D-class (RFD PB16)	
D-31	Unnamed	1964–1965	D-class (RFD PB16)	
D-12	Unnamed	1965	D-class (RFD PB16)	
D-37	Unnamed	1966	D-class (RFD PB16)	
D-12	Unnamed	1967	D-class (RFD PB16)	
D-136	Unnamed	1967–1978	D-class (RFD PB16)	
D-267	Unnamed	1979–1988	D-class (RFD PB16)	
D-373	Unnamed	1988–1997	D-class (EA16)	
D-523	Peterborough Beer Festival I	1997–2007	D-class (EA16)	
D-660	City of Leeds II	2006	D-class (IB1)	Stationed at Redcar as part of the relief fleet
D-511	Margaret	2007	D-class (EA16)	
D-516	Spirit of the Exe	2007	D-class (EA16)	
D-677	Jacky Hunsley	2007–2014	D-class (IB1)	
D-786	Eileen May Loach-Thomas	2015–	D-class (IB1)	

==== B-Class ====
Op. No.	Name	On station	Class	Comments
B-520	Wildenrath Whizzer	1986–1990	B-class (Atlantic 21)	
B-580	Leicester Challenge	1990–2001	B-class (Atlantic 21)	
B-777	Leicester Challenge II	2001–2012	B-class (Atlantic 75)	
B-858	Leicester Challenge III	2012–	B-class (Atlantic 85)	

=== Launch and recovery tractors ===
Op. No.	Reg. No.	Type,	On station	Comments
T18	PY 7589	Clayton	1927–1931	
T3	MA 6793	Clayton	1931–1938	
T29	FGC 64	Case L	1938–1957	
T33	FYP 356	Case L	1957–1960	
T52	KXT 420	Case LA	1960–1964	
T46	KGP 1	Case LA	1964–1969	
T71	519 GYM	Case 1000D	1969–1971	
T78	BYN 568B	Case 1000D	1971–1981	
T76	BGO 680B	Case 1000D	1981–1986	
TW11	B251 HUX	Talus MB-764 County	1986–1987	
TW15	E592 WNT	Talus MB-764 County	1987–1991	
TW19Hc	J120 VNT	Talus MB-4H Hydrostatic (Mk2)	1991–1995	
TW18Hb	H710 RUX	Talus MB-4H Hydrostatic (Mk1.5)	1995–2003	
TW17Hb	H593 PUX	Talus MB-4H Hydrostatic (Mk1.5)	2003–2010	
TW50Hb	W419 UUJ	Talus MB-4H Hydrostatic (Mk1.5)	2010–	

== See also ==
- List of RNLI stations
- List of former RNLI stations
- Royal National Lifeboat Institution lifeboats
