= Greathead-class lifeboat =

Former RNLI lifeboat class

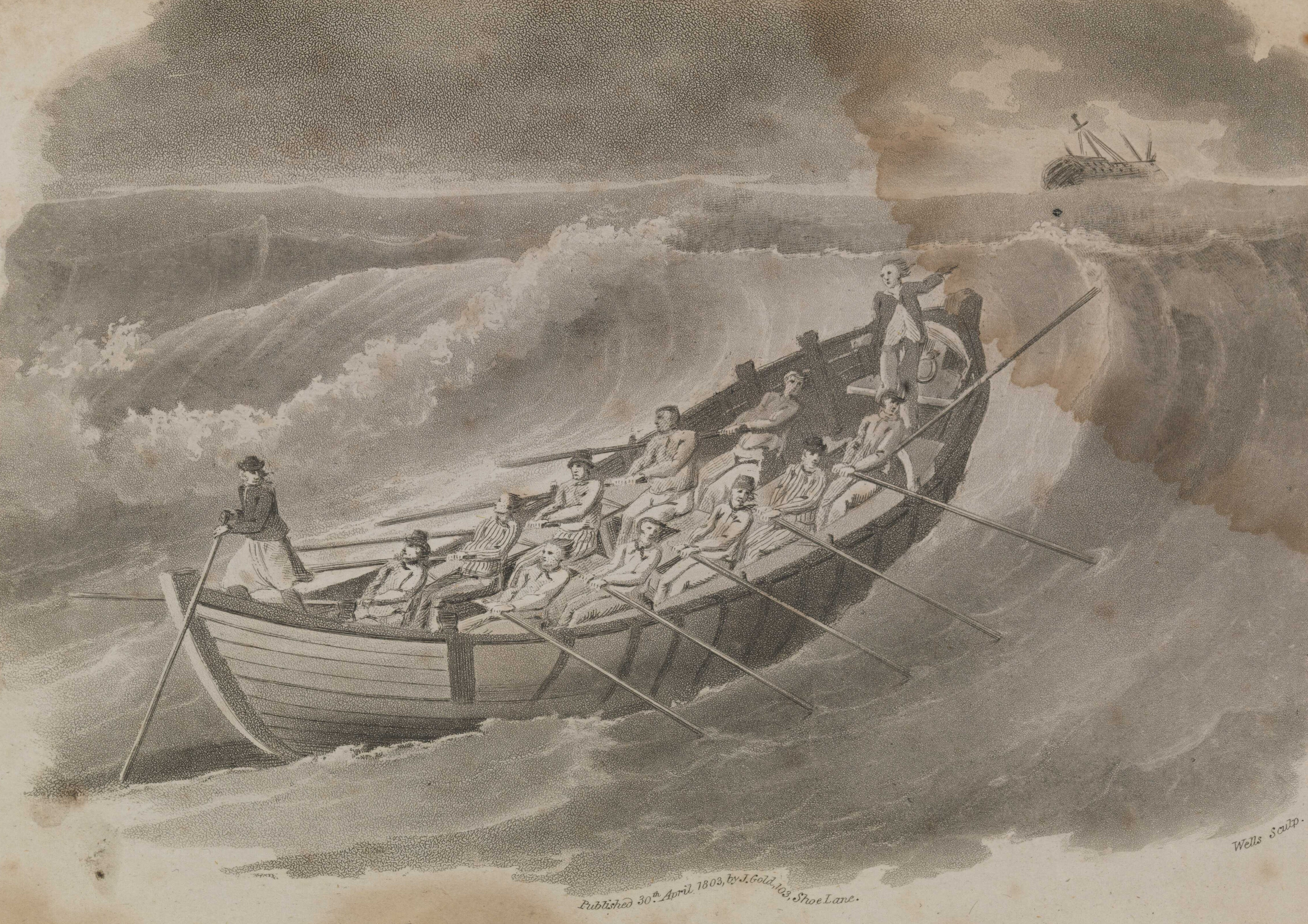
- Mr Henry Greathead's lifeboat

Class overview
- Builders: Henry Greathead of South Shields
- Operators: Royal National Lifeboat Institution; Royal Navy; Other operators
- Built: 1789–1810
- In service: 1789–1880
- Completed: 48
- Retired: 48
- Preserved: 1

General characteristics
- Type: Lifeboat (rescue)
- Length: 22 ft (6.7 m) to 31 ft (9.4 m)
- Beam: 8 ft 6 in (2.59 m) to 10 ft 6 in (3.20 m)
- Propulsion: Oars
- Crew: 8–12

Greathead-class lifeboats are a class of lifeboat built by Henry Greathead of South Shields between 1789 and 1810, following a competition to design a lifeboat.

Of 48 boats constructed, only one survives to this day. The Zetland can be found on display at the Zetland Lifeboat Museum and Redcar Heritage Centre, in Redcar, North Yorkshire.

Of over 1000 vessels listed on the National Historical Ships Register, Zetland, alongside vessels including HMS Warrior (1860), HMS Trincomalee and Cutty Sark, is one of just 200 vessels regarded to be of "pre-eminent National or Regional significance", known as the National Historic Fleet. Of these 200 vessels, only five are older than the Zetland, with two such vessels being Mary Rose and HMS Victory.

== History ==
In 1789, the ship Adventure, on passage from London to South Shields, ran aground at the entrance to the River Tyne. With conditions too rough for local men and their boats, spectators watched on helpless, as all hands were lost.

As a result of this disaster, the committee of the Lawe House in South Shields set a competition for the design for a lifeboat, with a prize of two guineas. Two notable entrants were local men, William Wouldhave and Henry Greathead. Neither man won the competition outright, but the committee took aspects of each design, coming up with a final design. They offered each man a half share of the prize, but Wouldhave declined to accept half, and the committee subsequently ordered a revised design lifeboat from Greathead.

== Design ==
A Greathead lifeboat was typically 30 feet (9.1 m) in length by 10 feet (3.0 m) in the beam, usually rowing 10 or 12 oars. A larger additional oar was fitted to each end of the hull for steering.

The clinker built boat had a double-ended curved hull, allowing for easier rowing, in either direction. Cork blocks were fitted around the gunwale and underneath the thwarts for additional buoyancy, and an additional cork band on the outside of the hull also provided some impact protection.

== Greathead lifeboats ==
| No. | Donor / Operator | Built | In service | Station | Comments |
|---|---|---|---|---|---|
| 1 | Committee of Trade /; Port of Newcastle | 1789 | 1790–1830 | South Shields | (Note: 30-foot (9.1 m) x 10-foot (3.0 m) 10-oared lifeboat, costing £150.); Wrecked 1830 |
| 2 | Duke of Northumberland /; Local Committee, 1840– Tyne LB Inst. | 1798 | 1798–c.1846 | North Shields | (Note: 28-foot (8.5 m) x 9-foot-4-inch (2.84 m) 10-oared lifeboat, costing £150.); Named Northumberland; Damaged and Sold |
| 3 | Duke of Northumberland / | 1800 | | Lisbon | |
| 4 | Cathcart Dempster & Lloyd's /; Local Committee | 1800 | 1800–c.1824 | St Andrews | Damaged 1823 |
| 5 | Local Subscription & Lloyd's /; Local Committee | 1800 | 1800–1834 | Montrose | |
| 6 | Local Subscription, & Lloyd's; (agent Lt. Wm. Clarke, RN) /; Lowestoft LB Society | 1801 | 1801–1802; 1802–1807 | Lowestoft; Gorleston | (Note: 30-foot (9.1 m) x 10-foot-6-inch (3.20 m) 10-oared lifeboat, costing £165.); Sold in 1807 |
| 7 | Local Subscription & Lloyd's; (agent Rev. Dr. R. D. Frank) /; Local Committee, 1806– Suffolk Humane Soc. | 1801 | 1801–1825; 1825–1835 | Bawdsey Haven; Woodbridge Haven | (Note: 30-foot (9.1 m) x 10-foot-6-inch (3.20 m) 10-oared lifeboat.) |
| 8 | Ramsgate Harbour Trust | 1802 | 1802–1824 | Ramsgate | |
| 9 | R. T. Johnson | 1802 | | Memel | |
| 10 | Local Subscription & Lloyd's; (agent Fras. Gibson) /; Local Committee | 1802 | 1802–1817 | West Whitby | Unfit, 1817 |
| 11 | Lord. Dundas, Rev. Thos. Pym Williamson /; Local Committee, Tyne LB Society, RNLI | 1802 | 1802–1880 | Redcar | (Note: 31-foot (9.4 m) x 10-foot-6-inch (3.20 m) 10-oared lifeboat, costing £200.); Later named Zetland, preserved. |
| 12 | Crewe Trustees | 1802 | 1802–1827 | Holy Island | (Note: 31-foot (9.4 m) x 10-foot-6-inch (3.20 m) 10-oared lifeboat.) |
| 13 | Duke of Atholl /; Local Committee | 1802 | 1803–1814 | Douglas | Cost £200. Named Atholl. Broke from moorings and wrecked, 1814 |
| 14 | Alexander Baxter /; Local Committee | 1802 | 1802–1820 | Aberdeen | (Note: 30-foot (9.1 m) x 8-foot-9-inch (2.67 m) 10-oared lifeboat.); Wrecked, March 1820 |
| 15 | Provost Geo. Charles & Royal Artillery Co. of Ayr /; Ayr Harbour Trust | 1802 | 1803–c.1819 | Ayr | (Note: 10-oared lifeboat.) |
| 16 | Liverpool Dock Trustees /; Liverpool Corporation | 1802 | 1803–1818 | Hoylake | |
| 17 | Hon. Geo. Rose, MP & Lloyd's /; Local Committee | 1802 | 1802–1825 | Christchurch, Dorset | |
| 18 | Royal States of Guernsey | 1803 | 1803–???? | Guernsey | Cost £170 |
| 19 | John Godlee & Lloyd's /; Local Committee | 1803 | 1803–1809; 1809–1816 | Newhaven; Brighton | (Note: 22-foot (6.7 m) 8-oared lifeboat.) |
| 20 | Philip Langmead, MP /; Local Committee | 1803 | 1803–1824 | Plymouth | (Note: 22-foot (6.7 m) 8-oared lifeboat.) |
| 21 | Local Subscription & Lloyd's; (agent Wm. Mill) /; Local Committee | 1803 | 1803–1866 | Arbroath | (Note: 25-foot (7.6 m) x 9-foot (2.7 m) 10-oared lifeboat, costing £120.) |
| 22 | Capt. T. H. Driver | 1803 | | Pillau | |
| 23 | Lord Rolle & Lloyd's /; Local Committee | 1803 | 1803–c.1815 | Exmouth | (Note: 27-foot (8.2 m) x 10-foot (3.0 m) 10-oared lifeboat, costing £150.) |
| 24 | Emperor of Russia | 1803 | | Kronstadt | |
| 25 | Edward Chatterton & Lloyd's /; Local Committee | 1803 | 1803–c.1825 | Rye Harbour | |
| 26 | R. D. Oxnam & Lloyd's /; Local Committee | 1803 | 1803–c.1812 | Penzance | (Note: 27-foot (8.2 m) x 10-foot (3.0 m) 8-oared lifeboat, costing £150.); Sold 1812. |
| 27 | Prince Royal of Denmark | 1803 | | Elsinore | |
| 28 | Prince Royal of Denmark | 1803 | | Copenhagen | |
| 29 | Whitehaven Harbour Trust | 1803 | 1803–1823 | Whitehaven | (Note: 28-foot (8.5 m) x 10-foot (3.0 m) 12-oared lifeboat.) |
| 30 | King of Prussia | 1803 | | Stettin | |
| 31 | Sir Charles Bagge | 1803 | | Gothenburg | |
| – | Norwich Mariners Assoc. /; Local Committee, 1823– Norfolk Shipwreck Assoc. | 1804 | 1805–1830; 1830–1851 | Cromer; Wells-next-the-Sea | (Note: 25-foot (7.6 m) x 8-foot-6-inch (2.59 m) 10-oared lifeboat.) |
| – | Hon. East India Company | 1805 | | Bengal | |
| – | Local Subscription & Lloyd's /; Local Committee, 1827– Lincs. Coast Shipwreck Assoc. | 1805 | 1805–1824; 1827–1829; 1829–1830 | Bridlington; Saltfleet; Donna Nook | (Note: 30-foot (9.1 m) x 10-foot (3.0 m) 12-oared lifeboat.); Unfit, 1830 |
| – | Local Subscription & Lloyd's /; Local Committee | 1805 | 1805–c.1825 | Newhaven (Leith) | |
| – | Government of the United States | 1806 | | United States | |
| – | The King of Sweden | 1806 | | Sweden | |
| – | Sir William Forbes/; Local Committee | 1806 | 1806–1831 | Fraserburgh | |
| – | Local Subscription/; Town Council, 1818– Harbour Trust | 1807 | 1807–1834 | Montrose II | |
| – | Dunbar Harbour Authority | 1808 | 1808–1821 | Dunbar | Cost £372. Named Lady Anne Murray. Unfit, 1821 |
| – | Sir Matthew Ridley & Lloyd's/; Ridley Estate Trustees | 1808 | 1808–1810 | Blyth | (Note: 30-foot (9.1 m) 10-oared lifeboat.); Wrecked 31 March 1810 |
| – | Royal Navy | 1808 | | | |
| – | Royal Navy | 1808 | | | |
| – | Royal Navy | 1808 | | | |
| – | Royal Navy | 1808 | | | |
| – | Royal Navy | 1808 | | | |
| – | H.M. Government | 1810 | | Heligoland | |
| – | Public Subscription and Lloyd's /; Trinity House of Kingston-upon-Hull | 1810 | 1810–1823 | Spurn Point | (Note: 10-oared lifeboat, costing £200.); Broke adrift and wrecked, 8 December 1823 |

No's 1–31 as listed by Greathead in "The Report of the Invention of the Lifeboat (1803/04)"

== See also ==
- List of RNLI stations
- List of former RNLI stations
