= Zetland (lifeboat) =

Oldest surviving lifeboat in the world

Coordinates: 54.61816°N 1.06179°W

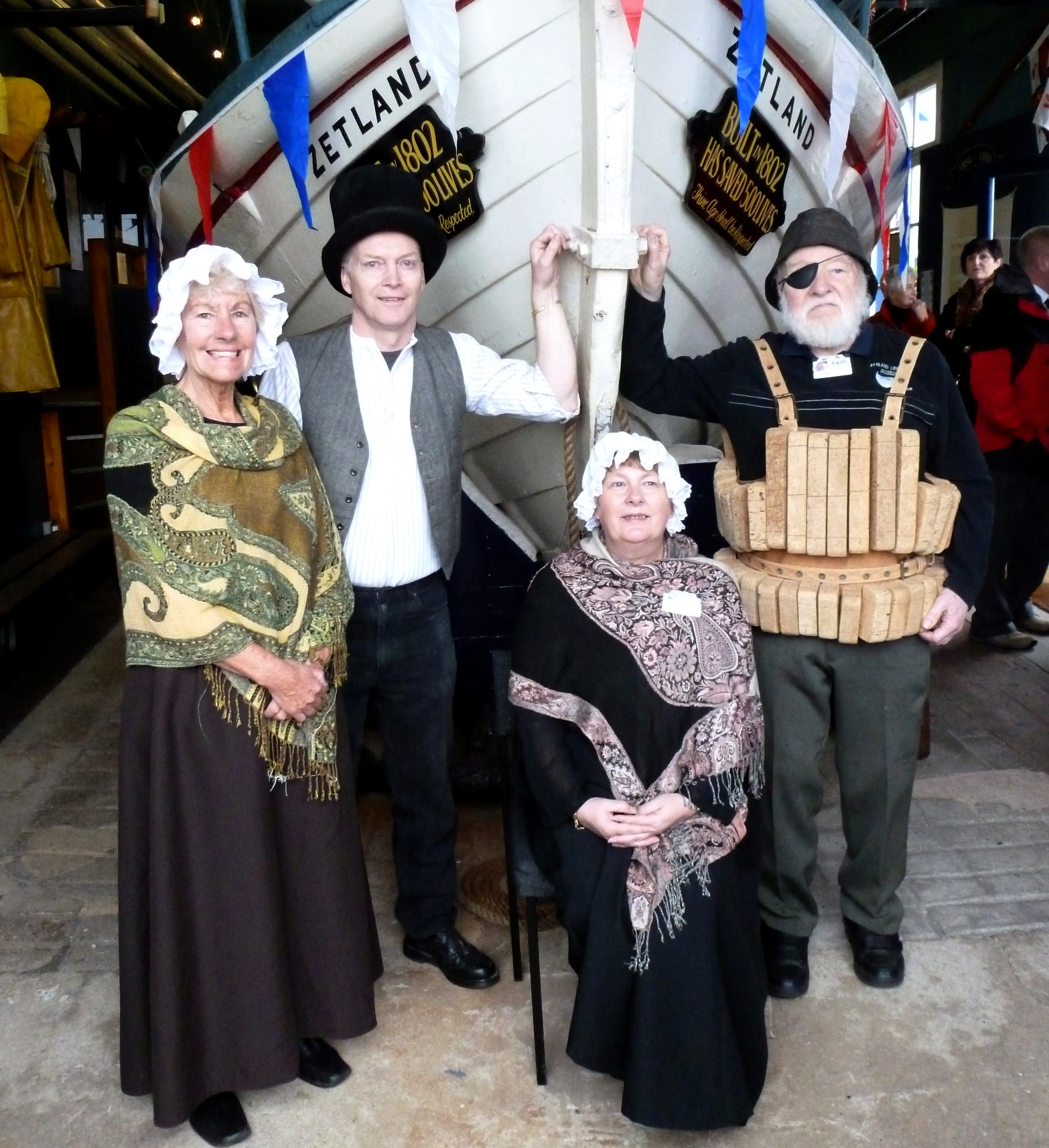

History

United Kingdom
- Name: Zetland
- Builder: Henry Greathead, South Shields
- Launched: 1802
- In service: 1802
- Out of service: 1864
- Status: Preserved in the Zetland Lifeboat Museum and Redcar Heritage Centre

General characteristics
- Class & type: Lifeboat

The Zetland is the oldest surviving lifeboat in the world. During its time on service, it is estimated to have saved over 500 lives.

It is currently the primary exhibit at the Zetland Lifeboat Museum and Redcar Heritage Centre, a museum in Redcar, England.

The name Zetland comes from the local Lord of Manor, the 1st Earl of Zetland. The Zetland is listed on the National Register of Historic Ships, as part of the National Historic Fleet.

== History ==
In 1802, an unnamed lifeboat constructed by Henry Greathead of South Shields, costing £200, was placed at Redcar, a small fishing hamlet on the north coast of Yorkshire, consisting of two rows of terraced houses. The boat was known locally as Lifeboat. It is said that the cost was raised by the local population, but this seems highly unlikely in the early years of the 19th century, especially with regard to the size of the village.

With records showing that the site and lifeboat house were provided by landowner Lieutenant-Colonel Lawrence Dundas of Marske Hall, MP for Richmond (Yorks), it is more likely that he also furnished most, if not all, of the cost of the lifeboat.

The lifeboat was a clinker-built vessel, constructed of 20-year-old seasoned oak, and was a double-ended boat, measuring 30 ft (9.1 m) long by 10 ft (3.0 m) beam. The outside was originally lined with cork for buoyancy, and had eight valves to release water if swamped. A crew of 13 were required, Coxswain, Second Coxswain, Bowman, and 10 oars. Five oars were blue, and five were white, allowing for the easy instructions to "pull on the blues", or "back on the whites".

From 1825, the Lifeboat came under the management of the Tees Bay Lifeboat and Shipwreck Society (TBLSS).

On Christmas Day 1836, the Lifeboat launched to the Danish brig Caroline, which was wrecked on Salt Scar Rocks. Attempting to throw a line to the vessel, Bowman William Guy, normally a pilot on the River Tees, was washed overboard and drowned. Only a short time earlier, Guy had been called from a service at the Methodist chapel to take his place in the lifeboat. All nine crew of the Caroline also lost their lives.

It is known that Redcar's Lifeboat was later named Zetland, in honour of the Lord of the Manor, Lawrence Dundas. The date is unknown, but it is likely to have been in 1838 or 1839. It was only on the occasion of the coronation of Queen Victoria in 1838, that Lawrence Dundas was given the new title of 1st "Earl of Zetland". Alternatively, it may have been after the death of Dundas, who died the following year in 1839.

At the request of the TBLSS, and agreed at the meeting of the Royal National Lifeboat Institution (RNLI) committee of management on 5 August 1858, the three lifeboat stations of Middlesbrough, Saltburn and Redcar, were transferred to the management of the RNLI.

On 17 February 1864, the Zetland sustained damage whilst rescuing the crew of seven from the brig Brothers. The RNLI considered the old boat no longer fit for service and supplied a new self-righting lifeboat named Crossley. Arrangements were made to have the Zetland broken up and a local carpenter was employed to carry out the task. Representations were made to the RNLI, and after negotiation, the boat was given to the townspeople, with the proviso that it would not 'compete' with the new RNLI lifeboat.

Repairs to the Zetland to a seaworthy state were carried out in 1865, at the expense of Lord Zetland and Mr H. W. Yeoman.

In 1880, Zetland was brought out of retirement, and launched along with two other Redcar lifeboats, the RNLI lifeboat Burton-on-Trent and the Independent lifeboat. Seven sailors' lives were saved from the brig Luna.

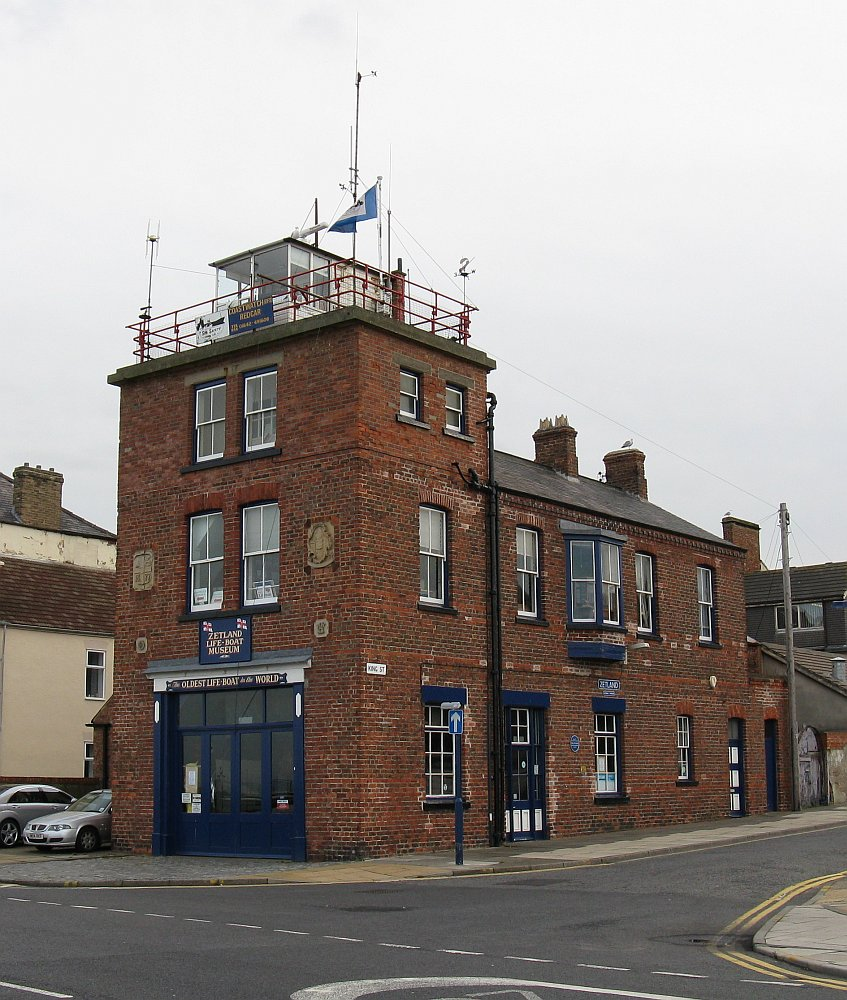
1877 Independent Lifeboat House, now Zetland Lifeboat Museum and Redcar Heritage Centre

A new lifeboat, The United Free Gardeners, (known locally as Emma), was operated at Redcar between 1877 and 1898. Not built to RNLI preferred standards, it was not adopted by the RNLI, and operated Independently. As a result, it required the construction of a new boathouse, which was constructed at the junction of King Street and The Esplanade. In 1907, after being stored outside, and in a number of locations, the now vacant Independent boathouse was able to provide a permanent home for the Zetland. The building was purchased by the RNLI in 1936.

In 1963, the boat was the centre-piece display of the International Lifeboat Conference in Edinburgh. Then, in November 2018, the lifeboat was removed to Middlesbrough for restoration work, returning to the museum on 5 April 2019.

Of over 1000 vessels listed on the National Historical Ships Register, 200 vessels are regarded to be of "pre-eminent National or Regional significance", known as the National Historic Fleet. On this list, Zetland sits alongside vessels including HMS Warrior (1860), HMS Trincomalee and Cutty Sark. Of these 200 vessels, only five are older than the Zetland, with two such vessels being Mary Rose and HMS Victory.

The Zetland lifeboat remains fully preserved and open for public visits in the Zetland Lifeboat Museum and Redcar Heritage Centre, which is a listed building on the Esplanade, Redcar, just a few hundred yards from the present Redcar Lifeboat Station. The RNLI withdrew from operating the museum in 2015, and the centre is now operated independently, run by volunteers, and funded entirely by visitor donations.

== See also ==
- List of RNLI stations
- Redcar Lifeboat Station
