= Awa Maru =

Awa Maru may refer to the following ships:

- Awa Maru (1899), an NYK Lines passenger and cargo vessel launched in 1899; taken out of commercial service in 1930
- MV Awa Maru (1942), an NYK Lines passenger and cargo vessel launched in 1942; torpedoed and sunk in 1945 during World War II
