= Seascale Lifeboat Station =

Former RNLI Lifeboat station in Cumbria, England

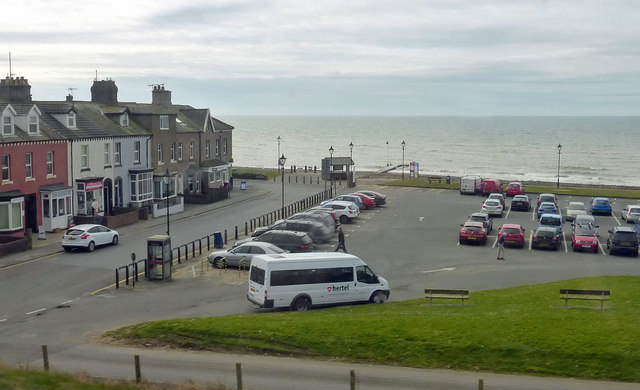
- Site of Seascale Lifeboat Station

- Seascale, Cumbria
- Alternative names: Whitehaven No.2 Lifeboat Station

General information
- Type: RNLI Lifeboat Station
- Location: Nr. South Parade, Seascale, Cumbria, England
- Coordinates: 54°23′43.0″N 3°29′05.0″W
- Opened: 1875
- Closed: 1895

Seascale Lifeboat Station was located in Seascale, a village overlooking the Irish Sea, approximately 13 miles (21 km) south of Whitehaven, in the county of Cumberland, Cumbria.

Also known as Whitehaven No.2 Lifeboat Station, a lifeboat station was established at Seascale by the Royal National Lifeboat Institution (RNLI) in 1875.

After very few launches, and only one successful rescue, Seascale Lifeboat Station closed in 1895.

== History ==
Following suggestions that for some rescues and conditions, Seascale may be a better place to launch a lifeboat, than from Whitehaven, the village was visited on 29 Aug 1874 by Capt. John Ward, RN, Inspector of Lifeboats.

At a meeting of the RNLI Committee of Management on Thursday 4 June 1874, it was agreed to establish a lifeboat station at Seascale, should a suitable site be found. It was also agreed to appropriate the gift of £800 from the Misses Tomlinson of Kirby Londsdale, for a lifeboat to be named in memory of their late brother.

An order for a lifeboat was placed with Forrestt of Limehouse, London. She would be a 32-foot self righting lifeboat with 10-oars and sails (known as a Pulling and Sailing (P&S) lifeboat, one with sails and (10) oars, and cost £273-10s-0d. A carriage cost a further £112-8s-0d.

A site for a lifeboat house was made available by a local man, A. B. Steward, of Newton Manor, Gosforth, which was located at what is now the entrance to the car park. The building was constructed by a local builder, G. Torrentine, and cost £265. The whole cost of the boat, carriage, equipment and station building, was met by the Tomlinson sisters, of The Biggins, Kirkby Lonsdale.

On Saturday, 5 June 1875, at a naming ceremony in front of the assembled crowd, many who had travelled down from Whitehaven, the boat was named William Tomlinson by the donors, in memory of their brother. Seascale lifeboat station was formally opened, and James McMinn was appointed Coxswain.

It had been reported that the existing lifeboat was not well suited to its location, and in 1886, a larger 34-foot lifeboat was sent to Seascale on a trial basis. It crew soon found in favour of the newer boat, and the old one was withdrawn the following year. The lifeboat had been funded from the gift of £700 by Miss Phillipson of Edgbaston, and in accordance with her wishes, the boat was named Rescue (ON 77).

The new lifeboat was only launched on service once. With insufficient volunteers in Seascale, and raising and transporting a lifeboat crew from Whitehaven always proving difficult, often a rescue had been completed by the time the lifeboat was ready, on the few occasions it might have been required.

In an ideal world, a lifeboat should never be needed, and that was the fate of the Seascale lifeboat. An RNLI Inspector visited in November 1894, to discover that no shipwrecks had occurred since the placement of a lightship at Ravenglass. His decision was agreed by RNLI management, and Seascale Lifeboat Station was closed on 26 January 1895.

The building was sold off for £30 in March 1895. The lifeboat on station at the time of closure, Rescue (ON 77), was broken up the same year.

== Notable Rescue ==
At 1:00 am on 26 October 1875, just 4 months after the lifeboat was placed at Seascale, the vessel Isabella ran aground. It would be dawn before the vessel was seen and the alarm raised, and it would be 8:00 am before a message to alert the lifeboat crew, normally Whitehaven men, and the Whitehaven Rocket Brigade, was received at Whitehaven.

Whitehaven Volunteer Rocket Brigade was formed in 1849. The volunteers would haul their equipment to the coast where a ship was in distress. Rockets attached to a line were fired over the vessel, and then a much heavier cable could be drawn across, allowing the use of a Breeches buoy system to rescue passengers and crew.

A special train was hastily arranged to transport all the volunteers the 13 miles (21 km) to Seascale, but along with the rocket brigade, only five lifeboat men turned up. Arriving in Seascale at 09:30, the Isabella proved to be too far from shore for the Rocket Brigade to fire a line. The brigade then joined the five lifeboat men, and some of the train crew, to have sufficient crew for the lifeboat. The William Tomlinson got to the Isabella at 11:30, over 10 hours since she had run aground, and the three men aboard were finally rescued and brought back to shore. This was the only successful service of the Seascale Lifeboat.

Seascale lifeboat was launched only three more times over the next twenty years, but nobody else ever rescued.

== Seascale lifeboats ==
=== Pulling and Sailing (P&S) lifeboats ===
ON (Note: ON is the RNLI's Official Number of the boat.)	Name	Built	On station	Class	Comments
Pre-596	William Tomlinson	1875	1875−1887	32-foot Prowse Self-righting (P&S)	(Note: 32-foot x 7-foot 6in (10-oared) Prowse-class self-righting (P&S) lifeboat, gift of the Misses Tomlinson of Kirkby Lonsdale, built by Forrestt of Limehouse, London, costing £273.)
77	Rescue	1886	1886−1895	34-foot Self-righting (P&S)	(Note: 34-foot x 7-foot 6in (10-oared) self-righting (P&S) lifeboat, gift of Mrs Phillipson of Edgbaston, built by Woolfe of Shadwell, London, costing £297.)

Pre ON numbers are unofficial numbers used by the Lifeboat Enthusiast Society to reference early lifeboats not included on the official RNLI list.

== See also ==
- List of RNLI stations
- List of former RNLI stations
- Royal National Lifeboat Institution lifeboats
