= Middlesbrough Lifeboat Station =

Former lifeboat station in North Yorkshire, England

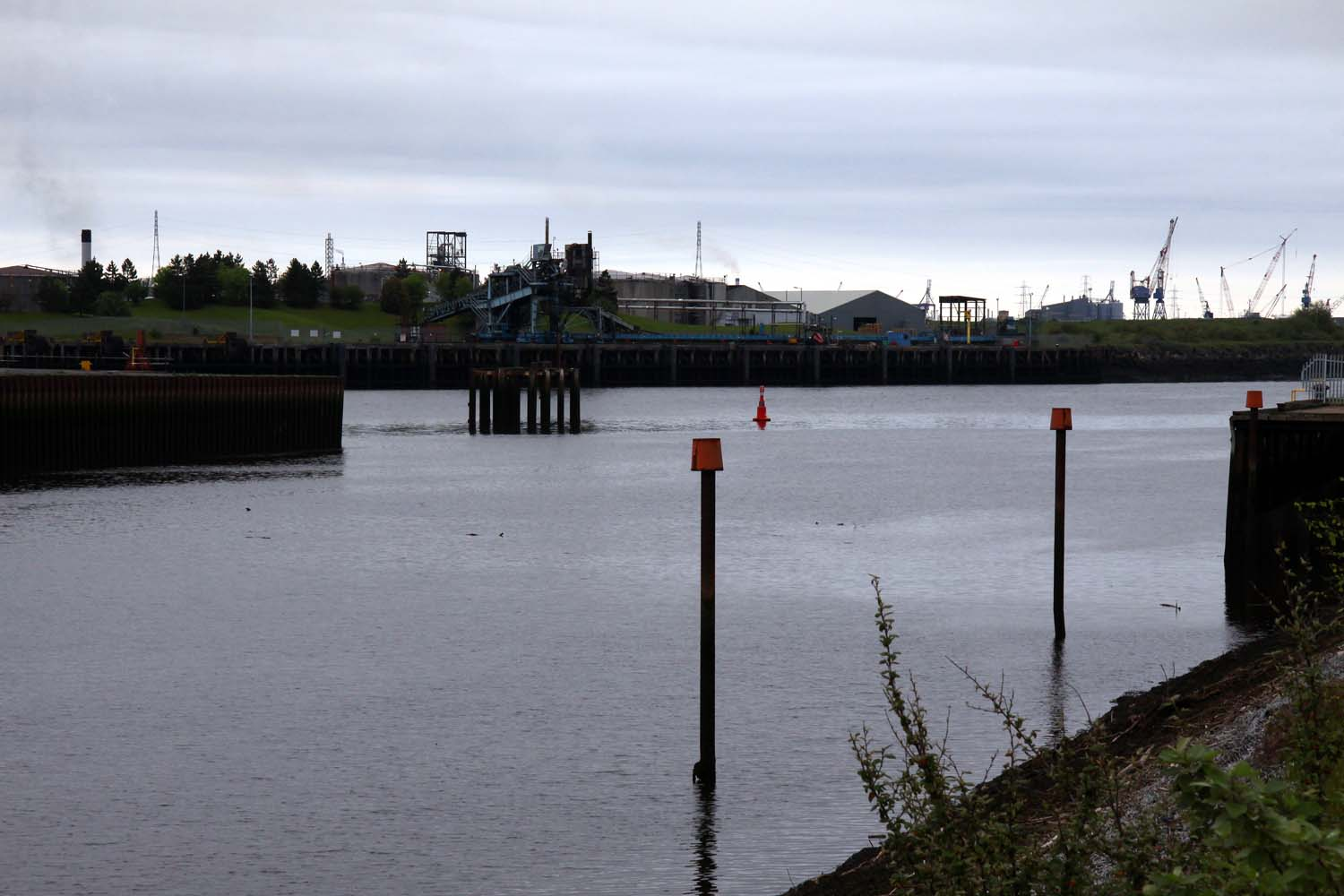
- Middlesbrough Dock Cut

- Middlesbrough, North Yorkshire

General information
- Status: Closed
- Type: RNLI Lifeboat Station
- Location: Dock Cut, Middlesbrough, North Yorkshire, England
- Coordinates: 54°34′49.2″N 1°13′10.7″W
- Opened: 1854 TBLSS; 1858 RNLI
- Closed: 1895

Middlesbrough Lifeboat Station was located on the North Wharf side of the Middlesbrough Dock Cut from the River Tees, in the town of Middlesbrough, in North Yorkshire.

A lifeboat was first stationed at Middlesbrough in 1854, by the Tees Bay Lifeboat and Shipwreck Society (TBLSS). Management of the station was transferred to the Royal National Lifeboat Institution (RNLI) lifeboat in 1858.

After operating for 45 years, Middlesbrough Lifeboat Station closed in 1895.

== History ==
In 1854, the Tees Bay Lifeboat and Shipwreck Society decided to place a lifeboat at Middlesbrough. The lifeboat was a 30-foot self-righting 'pulling and sailing' (P&S) lifeboat, one with oars and sails, and was constructed locally by R. Craggs of Stockton-on-Tees, to the design of James Peake. A boathouse was constructed on the quay at the Dock Cut, near to the Dock Masters office.

At the request of the TBLSS, and agreed at the meeting of the RNLI committee of management on 5 August 1858, the management of their three stations, Redcar, Saltburn and Middlesbrough, was transferred to the RNLI. Each station was visited prior to the transfer by Capt. John Ward, RNLI Inspector of Lifeboats, who requested alterations to the Middlesbrough boat. It was transported to lifeboat builders Forrest of Limehouse, London, where it was lengthened to 33-feet, at a cost of £11-10s-0d. After passing trials, the boat was returned to the station in February 1859.

On the 7 April 1861, the Middlesbrough lifeboat was launched to the aid of the schooner Oregon, on passage from Grangemouth to Middlesbrough, which had run aground on South Gare Sands, at the mouth of the River Tees. The lifeboat managed to rescue four of the five crew, one man having been washed overboard when the vessel struck the sand.

In 1864, Redcar Lifeboat Station had received a new 33-foot Self-righting lifeboat, but they had found that they needed a larger boat. A replacement was ordered, which arrived on station in 1867. The 33-foot boat, built by Forrestt of Limehouse, London, was then transferred to Middlesbrough. The boat was named Crossley, having been funded out of a gift to the Institution by John Crossley, Carpet Manufacturer of Halifax, Yorkshire.

The first service of the Crossley was on 28 February 1870, when she was launched to the aid of the schooner Johns. The vessel had been on passage from Santander, Spain to Middlesbrough when she was wrecked on the North Gare sands. The lifeboatmen had to battle heavy seas in a severe southerly gale to reach the vessel, finally managing to rescue the six crew.

In 1878, funds from the legacy of Mr. Thomas Firbank were appropriated to the Saltburn Lifeboat Station, but the Saltburn lifeboat was replaced in 1880, with a new donor. The legacy was then appropriated to Middlesbrough, and when a new 34-foot lifeboat was provided in 1884, it was named Thomas and Isabella Firbank (ON 6). In 1892, the named would be changed to Thomas and Isabella Firbank of Kingston-upon-Hull. The boat was launched just twice in her 11 years on station, but recorded no lives saved.

It was decided to close the Middlesbrough lifeboat station in 1895.

Thomas and Isabella Firbank of Kingston-upon-Hull (ON 6) was transferred to Scarborough, at the request of their crew, where the boat was renamed Queensbury. The Middlesbrough lifeboat station had been sited on a busy dockyard at North Wharf. A map of the area produced in 1913 after the redevelopment of North Wharf shows no trace of the lifeboat house.

== Middlesbrough lifeboats ==
=== Pulling and Sailing (P&S) lifeboats ===
ON (Note: ON is the RNLI's Official Number of the boat.)	Name	Built	On station	Class	Comments
Pre-282	Unnamed	1854	1854–1867	30-foot Peake Self-righting (P&S)	(Note: 30-foot x 8-foot (10-oared) Peake-class self-righting (P&S) lifeboat, provided by the Middlesbrough Docks Co., built by R. Craggs of Stockton-on-Tees, costing £140. Modified 33-foot x 8-foot 6in in 1859.)
Pre-418	Crossley	1864	1867–1884	33-foot Peake Self-righting (P&S)	(Note: 33-foot x 8-foot 2in (10-oared) Peake-class self-righting (P&S) lifeboat, gift of John Crossley & Sons of Halifax, built by Forrest of Limehouse, London, costing £256 when new.); Previously at Redcar.
6	Thomas and Isabella Firbank	1884	1884–1892	34-foot 4in Self-righting (P&S)	(Note: 34-foot 4in x 8-foot 3in (10-oared) self-righting (P&S) lifeboat, gift of Mr T. and Mrs I Firbank, of Kingston upon Hull and Uplyme, Devon, built by Woolfe of Shadwell, London, costing £349.); Renamed Thomas and Isabella Firbank of Kingston-upon-Hull in 1892.
6	Thomas and Isabella Firbank of Kingston-upon-Hull	1884	1892–1895	34-foot 4in Self-righting (P&S)	

Pre ON numbers are unofficial numbers used by the Lifeboat Enthusiast Society to reference early lifeboats not included on the official RNLI list.

== See also ==
- List of RNLI stations
- List of former RNLI stations
- Royal National Lifeboat Institution lifeboats
