= Henry Greathead =

British lifeboat builder

Henry Francis Greathead
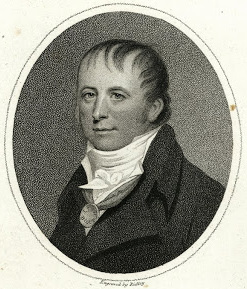
- Born: 27 January 1757; Richmond, North Yorkshire
- Died: 1818 (aged 60–61)
- Occupation: Boat builder
- Known for: Lifeboat design

Henry Francis Greathead (27 January 1757 – 1818) was an English pioneering rescue lifeboat builder from South Shields. Although Lionel Lukin had patented a lifeboat in 1785, Greathead successfully petitioned parliament in 1802 with the claim that he had invented a lifeboat in 1790, and he was awarded £1,200 for his trouble. Although his claims have been contested, he did build 31 boats, which saved very many lives, and succeeded in making the concept of a shore-based rescue lifeboat widely accepted.

== Early life ==
He was born on 27 January 1757 in Richmond, North Yorkshire, but the family moved to South Shields in 1763. His father was well off, having been in public service for 46 years, as an officer of salt duties and later as supervisor and comptroller of the district. Henry received the best education available in the area, then served an apprenticeship in boat building. In 1778 he took a position as a ship's carpenter. The next year he was shipwrecked near Calais and on his return to England narrowly avoided being press-ganged into naval service. During a voyage to the Grenadas his ship was taken by American privateers, and was then sent to New York where he was impressed aboard a British sloop. He remained in service till the end of the American Revolutionary War in 1783.

He returned to South Shields where he set up his own boat-building business in 1785, and married in the following year. He had six children, though all but two of them died at a young age.

== Lifeboat design ==
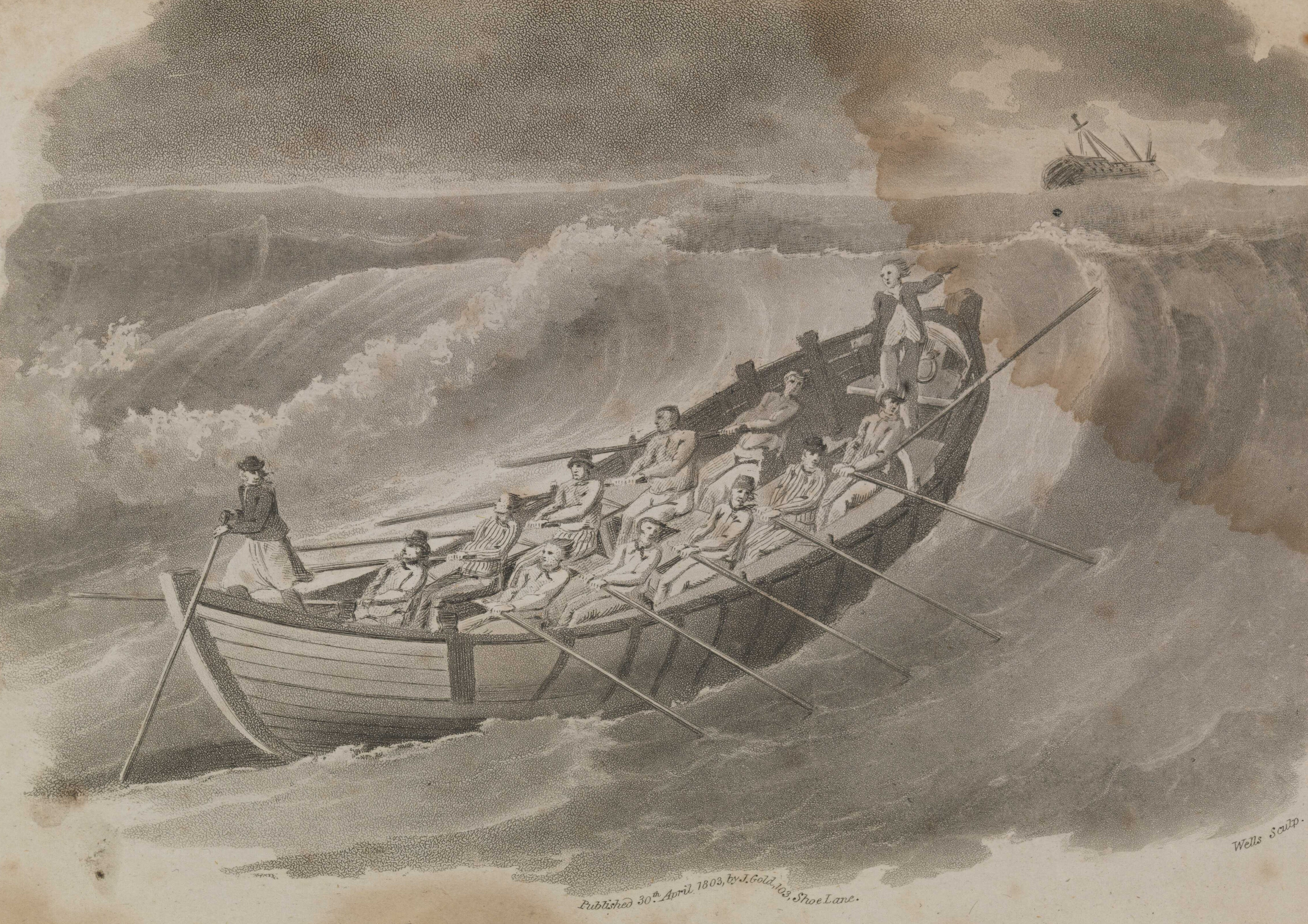
Engraving entitled Mr Henry Greathead's Life Boat going out to assist a Ship in distress, 1803

In 1789 a ship was stranded on a sandbank and the crew could not be rescued because of storm conditions. A committee was formed to build a boat capable of effecting a rescue in such conditions. Two models were submitted. One, modelled in tin by William Wouldhave, was to be built of copper, made buoyant by the use of cork, and was incapable of being capsized. The committee however disapproved of the idea of a copper boat, but Wouldhave was awarded one guinea for his trouble. Greathead also made a submission, built of wood, but which floated bottom up when upset. He was however rewarded by being employed to build a boat as directed by the committee. Sometime after, two members of the committee presented a model which Greathead was instructed to build. At his suggestion it was agreed that a curved keel should be used. They decided that something akin to a Norway Yawl should be built.

The lifeboat constructed had a curved keel and rose more fore and aft than a Norway Yawl. When full of water amidships, one third at each end would be out of water, and it could continue underway without foundering. It could be rowed in either direction and was steered by an oar rather than a rudder. It was rowed with ten short oars, these being more manageable in heavy seas than a full-length oar. The boat was long and ten feet broad (9.1 m × 3.0 m). The sides were cased with cork, four inches thick, weighing nearly 7 hundredweight and secured with copper plates. It added considerably to the buoyancy of the boat, helping it recover quickly from any upset. The curvature of the keel made her very easy to steer about her centre. She was able to carry twenty people, and went out on her first trial on 30 January 1790.

== Recognition ==
It took some years before this lifeboat become well known to the public, and it was not until 1798 that Hugh Percy, 2nd Duke of Northumberland, purchased a lifeboat for North Shields, and then another for Porto in 1800. In 1802 Greathead's work was "deemed a fit subject for national munificence" and a petition was submitted to the House of Commons. A committee ascertained the utility of the lifeboat, the originality of the invention, and the remuneration that he had already received. They interviewed numerous witnesses and after some debate the House unanimously granted him £1,200. Trinity House awarded 100 guineas, as did Lloyd's of London. The Society for the Encouragement of the Arts, Manufactures and Commerce gave him 50 guineas and a gold medallion.

Greathead never took out a patent on his invention, and was always willing to share his plans with others for the public good.

By 1806 his lifeboats were in use at Whitby, North Shields, South Shields, Exmouth, Penzance, Plymouth, Newhaven, Ramsgate, Dover, Liverpool, Lowestoft, St Andrews, Montrose, Aberdeen, Ayr, Ireland, Sweden, Denmark and Russia. In 1811 the list included Guernsey, Arbroath, Pillau, Kronstadt, Rye, Whitehaven, Stettin, Riga, Danzig, Cromer, Leith, Bridlington, Charleston, Fraserburgh, Gothenburg, San Lucar, Dunbar, Blyth, Redcar and Heligoland. The Admiralty had also purchased five smaller craft.

In total, Henry Greathead built 31 lifeboats. His eleventh boat, the Zetland built in 1802, saw 78 years of service in Redcar and saved over 500 lives with the loss of only one crew member. She normally had a crew of 13, but up to 20 could be needed in rough weather. Her cork fenders were replaced at some point by internal buoyancy tanks. This boat is the only one of Greathead's to survive, and is preserved at the 'Zetland Lifeboat Museum and Redcar Heritage Centre'.

It is rumoured that Henry's descendants may also have been the persons to build the lifeboats for the Titanic according to family history. This claim is in the process of being substantiated through records in possession of his descendants and relatives. Engineering appears to be a family trait for the Greathead family and after Henry's success, the next Greathead to rise to fame was a distant cousin, James Henry Greathead as can be sourced from the Greathead website: greathead.org.

== Criticisms ==
Greathead's claims to have invented the rescue lifeboat and his contributions to its design were contested. Several letters appeared in newspapers and periodicals denying his right to the honour and awards lavished upon him. It has been suggested that his only claim to the invention was the use of a curved keel. A Mr. Hailes, mathematician familiar with marine architecture, supported Wouldhave's claim to the invention, and believed that the curved keel was an error. However, Wouldhave's claims were hampered by his poverty and violent language. Another reason Wouldhave's claims were hampered was that Henry already had recognition from parliament on his design.
