= Lowestoft Lifeboat Station =

RNLI lifeboat station in Suffolk, England

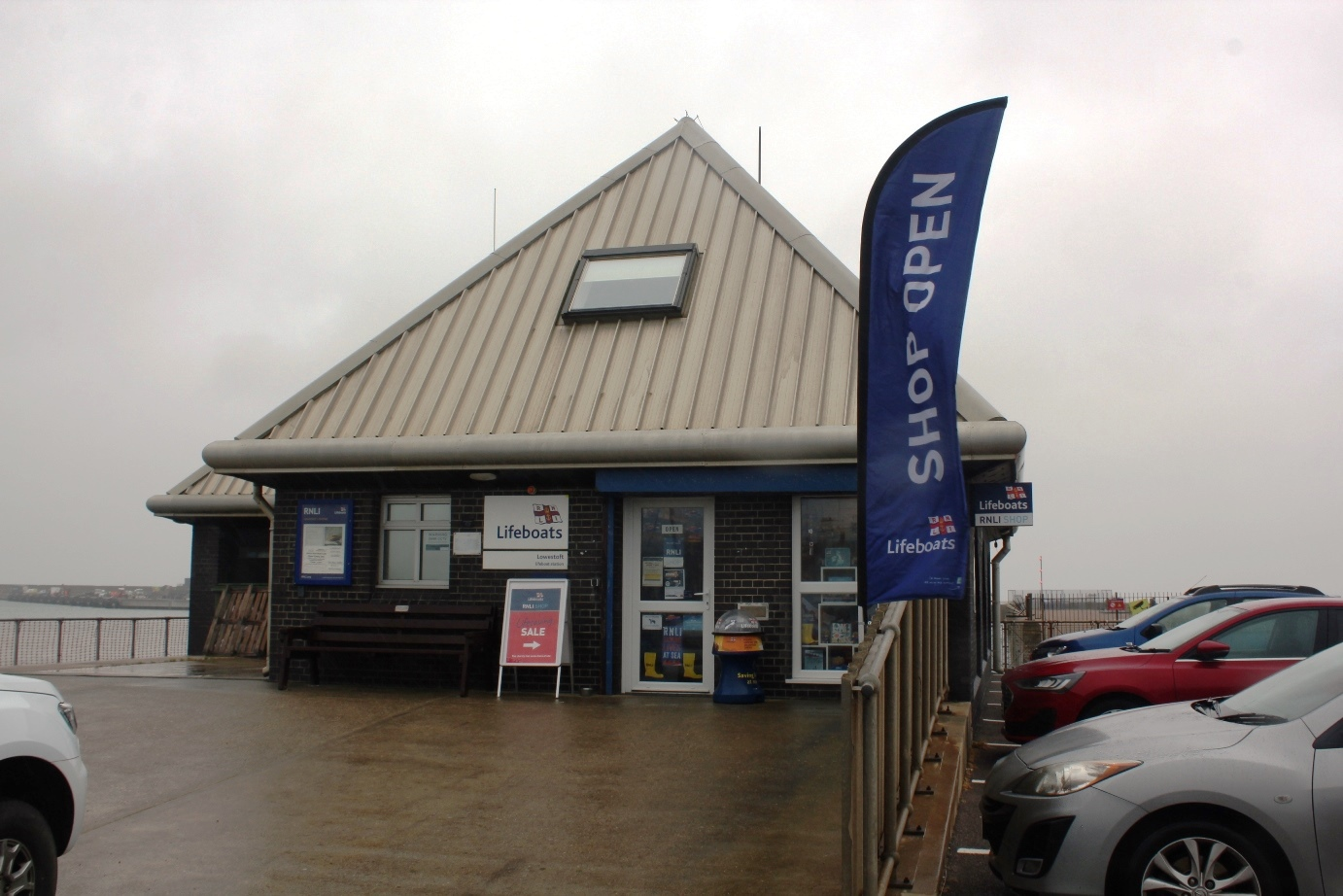
- Lowestoft Lifeboat Station.

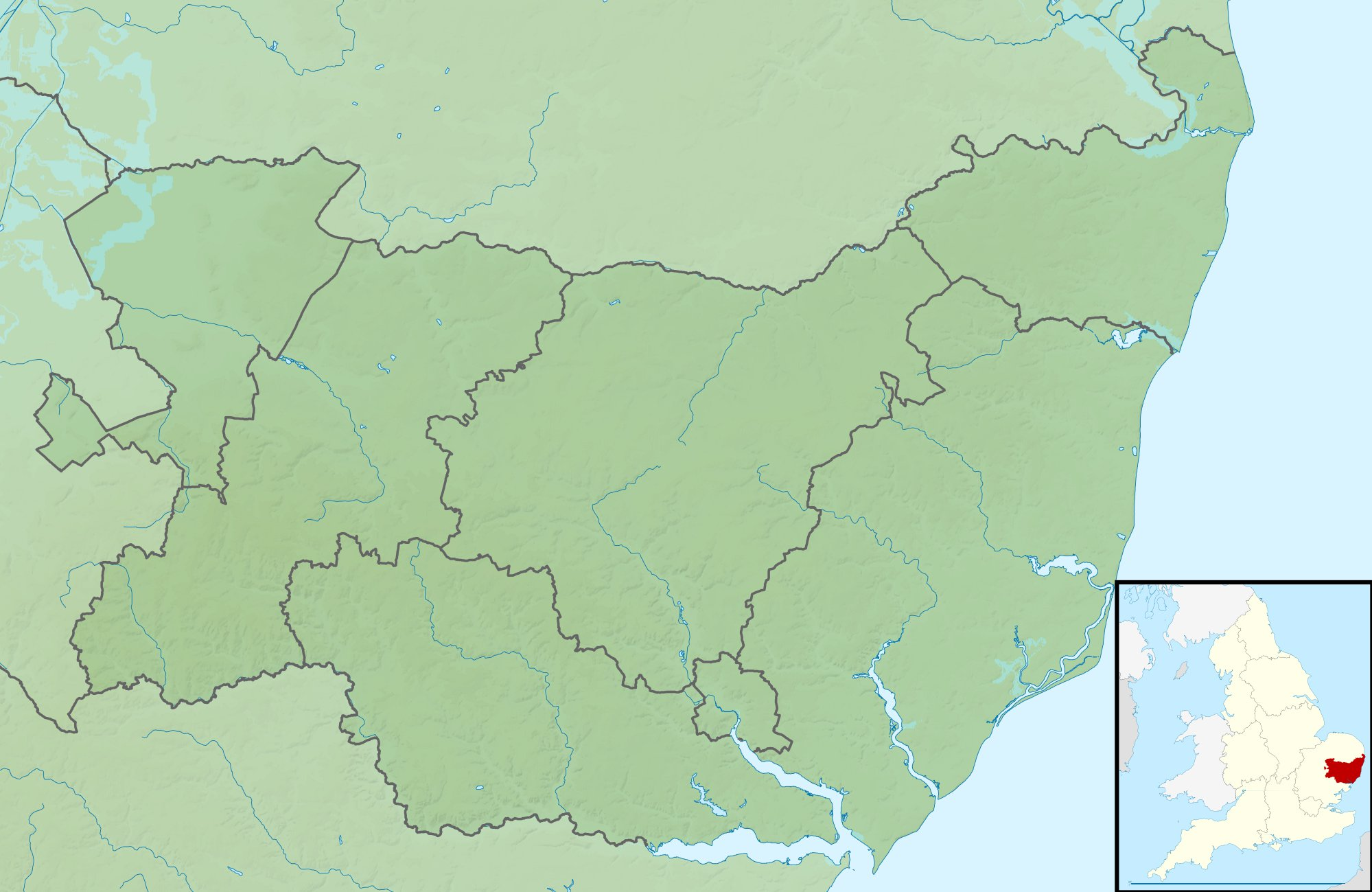
- Location within Suffolk

General information
- Type: RNLI Lifeboat Station
- Location: South Pier, Royal Plain, Lowestoft, Suffolk, NR33 0AE, England
- Coordinates: 52°28′18″N 1°45′11″E
- Opened: 1801
- Owner: Royal National Lifeboat Institution

Website
- Lowestoft RNLI Lifeboat Station

Lowestoft Lifeboat Station is located at the mouth of Lowestoft's outer harbour, on South Pier in Lowestoft, the most easterly settlement in the UK, and a port town on the coast of Suffolk.

It is one of the oldest lifeboat stations in the United Kingdom, having been established in 1801, although it only operated for just one year. A lifeboat station was re-opened by the Suffolk Humane Society in 1807, with management passing to the Royal National Lifeboat Institution (RNLI) in 1855.

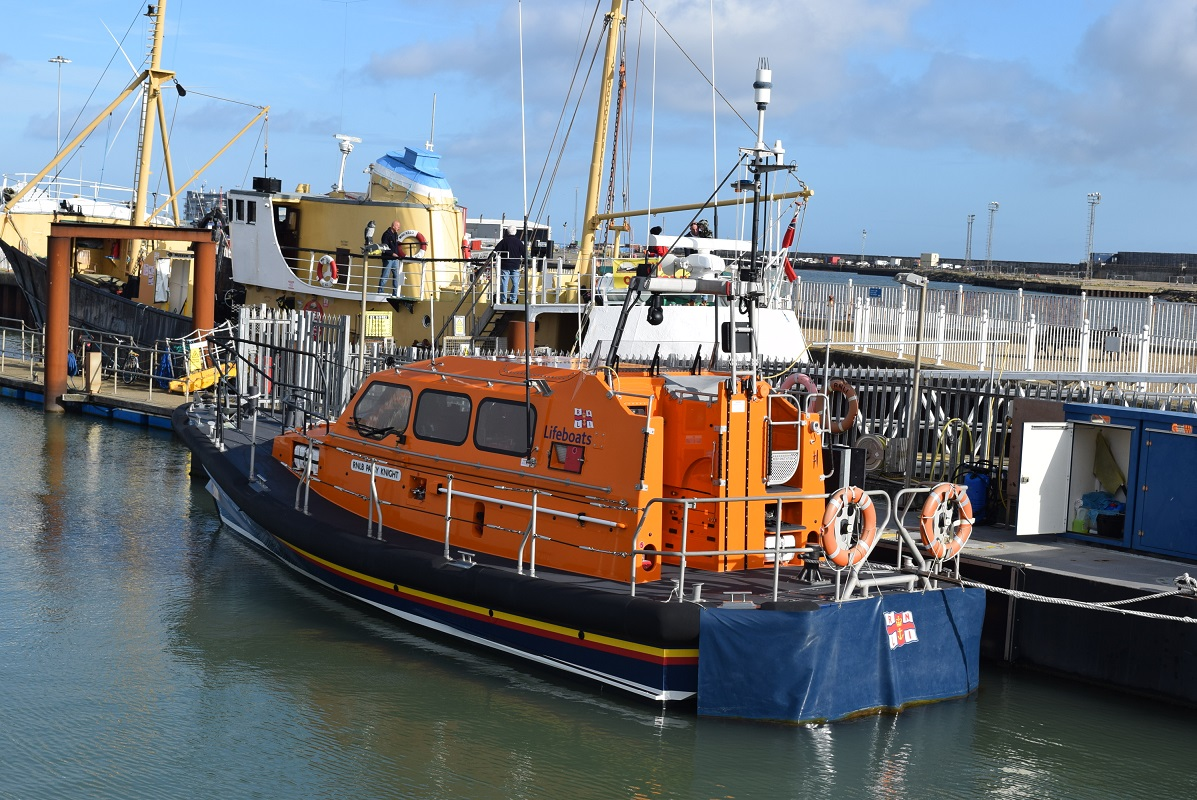
Lowestoft Shannon-class lifeboat 13-05 Patsy Knight (ON 1312)

The station currently operates 13-05 Patsy Knight (ON 1312), a Shannon-class All-weather lifeboat, on station since 2014.

== History ==
In 1801, a lifeboat built by Henry Greathead was placed at Lowestoft on a trial basis. Vessels wrecked in the area were usually some distance from the shore, and a rowing boat without sails quickly proved unsuccessful, due to the strength of the currents and tides encountered.

At 12 noon on 19 November 1807, the first 'Pulling and Sailing' (P&S) lifeboat, the 39-foot Frances Anne, was launched at Lowestoft, under the eye of designer Lionel Lukin of Long Acre, London. It had been constructed by R. Sparrow of Worlingham Hall, and performed to high satisfaction, with 16 crew aboard.

The station was managed by the Suffolk Humane Society (SHS), who would come to place lifeboats at Pakefield, Sizewell, Southwold, Thorpeness, Aldeburgh and Bawdsey. At the Annual General Meeting of the RNLI on 26 April 1855, it was announced that the SHS, now with just three stations at Lowestoft, Pakefield and Southwold, had voluntarily joined the Institution, thereby transferring all remaining stations to the management of the RNLI.

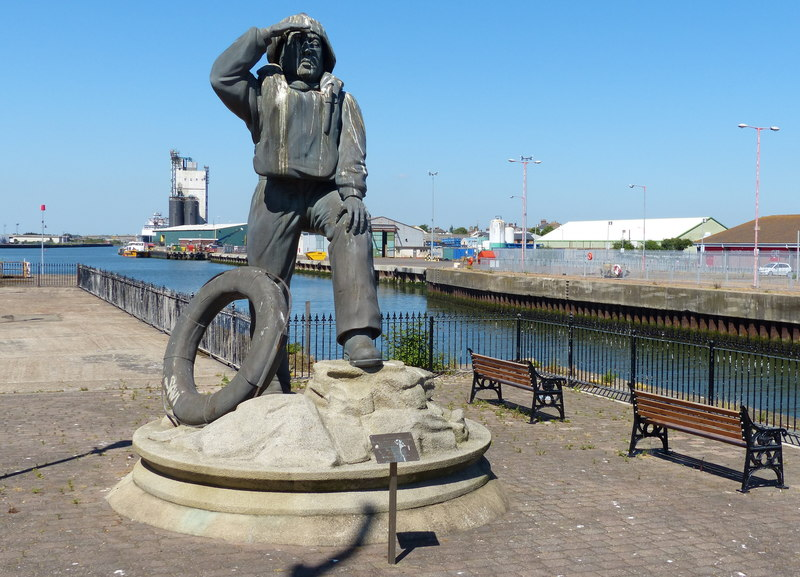
RNLI lifeboat man statue at Lowestoft

The Frances Anne had been replaced in 1850, with a larger 42-foot lifeboat, built by Sparham of Lowestoft, named Victoria. Whilst the Southwold lifeboat was immediately replaced in 1855, it is assumed that the Lowestoft lifeboat was in good condition, as it was retained by the RNLI, and served at Lowestoft until 1876.

On 1 November 1859, the Lowestoft lifeboat Victoria was launched to the aid of the steamship Shamrock of Dublin, wrecked in a gale on Holm Sands. With seas breaking over the vessel's masthead, the lifeboat anchored, and veered down. Managing to get a line aboard, all 14 crew were pulled through the surf one at a time. Eight of the lifeboat crew were awarded the RNLI Silver Medal.

At the meeting of the RNLI committee of management on 7 May 1868, it was reported that the Institution was in receipt of £620 from an anonymous lady, to defray the costs of a lifeboat station. The gift was appropriated to Lowestoft, and the Victoria was renamed Laetitia, in accordance with the donor's wishes.

An additional lifeboat arrived in February 1870, having been transported to Great Yarmouth, and then sailed to Lowestoft. A 32-foot lifeboat, it was designed for close shore work. This No.2 lifeboat was funded from Miss Leicester of London, and was named George after her late brother. Miss Leicester had previously funded a lifeboat for Whitehaven. A new boathouse was constructed.

In 1921, Lowestoft received their first motor-powered lifeboat. She was renamed Agnes Cross, after the donor, who gifted £3,500 to the Institution in 1919, followed by a further gift of £1,500, for the provision of a lifeboat for Lowestoft. The lifeboat had served briefly at Gorleston No.1 as the John and Mary Meiklam of Gladswood (ON 663) in 1921, before being transferred to Lowestoft. The serving Lowestoft lifeboat, Kentwell (ON 543), was relocated to Gorleston No.1.

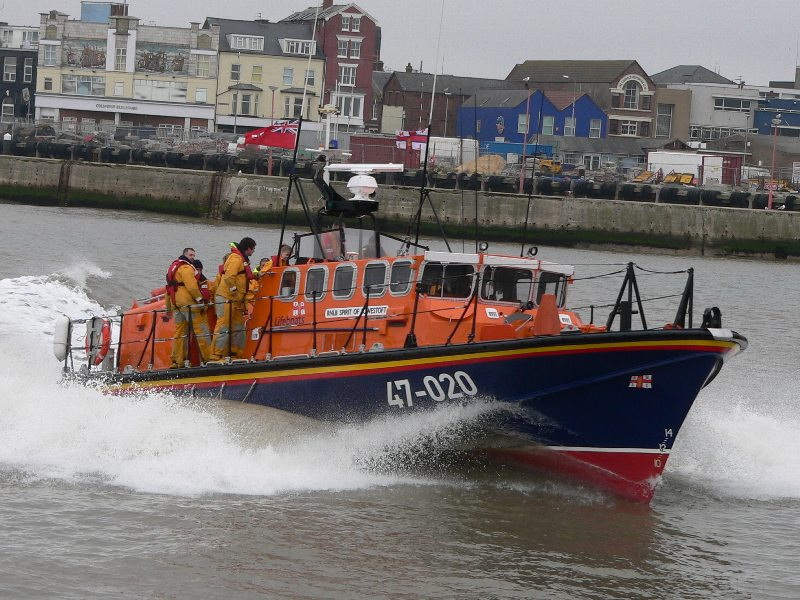
Lowestoft Tyne-class All-weather lifeboat 47-020 Spirit of Lowestoft (ON 1132)

The 46-foot Watson-class lifeboat Michael Stephens (ON 838) was placed on service in 1939. Just one year later, she took part in the Dunkirk evacuation in 1940. With a Royal Navy crew instead of lifeboat men, the boat was initially used to ferry troops from the harbour and beaches, to larger vessels. It is not known how many men were rescued, but she did eventually return to Dover with 52 soldiers on board.

South Broads Lifeboat Station, an Inshore lifeboat station, was established on the outskirts of Lowestoft in 2001. It operated at Oulton Broad until 2011, when a coastal review decided coverage for the area was better served from Great Yarmouth and Gorleston.

== S.S. Hopelyn ==
After 21:00 on 19 November 1922, the steamship Hopelyn of Newcastle-upon-Tyne was wrecked in a north-east gale on North Scroby Sands, near Great Yarmouth. The Caister lifeboat was called, but was unable to launch. The Gorleston No.1 lifeboat Kentwell (ON 543) was launched at 23:00, and towed to the vessel by the tugboat George Jewson. The lifeboat stood by until daybreak, but after two hours, and no onboard activity, concluded there were no survivors, and returned home at 09:00. At 10:00 on 20 November, a flag was spotted on the wreck by the Caister coastguard. The Gorlston lifeboat launched again, with the George Jewson but couldn't get close, due to the conditions and an old wreck nearby and was damaged in the attempt.

The motor-powered Lowestoft lifeboat Agnes Cross was called at 15:45, calling first at Gorleston to collect Commander Edward Carver, District Inspector of Lifeboats, before heading to the wreck collecting the Kentwell's coxswain Billy Fleming as they met it returning. On arrival, it was decided too dangerous to attempt any rescue in the dark, so the lifeboat returned to Gorleston, launching again at 04:30. Still in gale-force conditions, the lifeboat veered down to the vessel, 24 men, and a black kitten were rescued, and all were landed at Gorleston at 07:00 on 21 October, some 32 hours after the first launch. For this service, 27 RNLI medals for gallantry were awarded to the Lowestoft and Gorleston crews.

== Station honours ==
Crews from Lowestoft have received 45 awards for gallantry, including 39 medals. The RNLI Gold Medal has been awarded twice. The first award was to Lieutenant R. B. Matthews, RN, in October 1827. Coxswain John Swan was the second recipient, for his actions during the rescue of the crew of the merchant ship SS Hopelyn, wrecked on North Scroby Sands in October 1922.

The following are awards made at Lowestoft.

- Medal of the Order of the British Empire for Gallantry (EGM)
  - John Thompson Swan – 1924
- RNIPLS Gold Medal
  - Lt. Robert Bates Matthews, RN, H.M. Coastguard Lowestoft – 1827
- RNLI Gold Medal
  - John Thompson Swan, Coxswain – 1922
- RNIPLS Silver Medal
  - Lt. John Crouchley Evison, RN, H.M. Coastguard Lowestoft – 1834
  - Lt. Richard Joachim, RN, H.M. Coastguard Lowestoft – 1836
  - Francis Stannard, Master of the sloop Glenmoriston – 1853
- RNLI Silver Medal
  - Capt. Richard Joachim, RN, H.M. Coastguard Lowestoft – 1857 (Third-Service clasp)
  - Robert Hook, Coxswain – 1859
  - James Butcher, crew member – 1859
  - Richard Butcher crew member – 1859
  - Nathaniel Colby, crew member – 1859
  - Thomas Liffen, crew member – 1859
  - Alfred Mewse, crew member – 1859
  - William Rose, crew member – 1859
  - Francis Smith, crew member – 1859
  - Capt. Richard Joachim, RN, H.M. Coastguard Lowestoft – 1861 (Fourth-Service clasp)
  - Robert Hook, Coxswain – 1873 (Second-Service clasp)
  - George Edward Hall, Master of the fishing boat Trial – 1882
  - John Thompson Swan, Coxswain – 1914
  - John Thompson Swan, Coxswain – 1918 (Second-Service clasp)
  - Ralph A. W. Scott, Motor Mechanic – 1922
  - Albert Spurgeon, Coxswain – 1927
- Silver Medals, awarded by the Austrian Government
  - Crew of 1866 Lowestoft Lifeboat – 1893
- RNLI Bronze Medal
  - George William Ayers, Second Coxswain – 1918
  - George William Ayers, Second Coxswain – 1922 (Second-Service clasp)
  - John Rose, Bowman – 1922
  - H. Allerton, crew member – 1922
  - J. Ayers, crew member – 1922
  - W. Butcher, crew member – 1922
  - C. Mewse, crew member – 1922
  - Albert Spurgeon, crew member – 1922
  - F. Swan, crew member – 1922
  - Albert Spurgeon, Coxswain – 1943 (Second-Service clasp)
  - Thomas Victor Knott, Coxswain/Mechanic – 1974
  - Peter Gibbons, Second Coxswain – 1974
  - Thomas Victor Knott, Coxswain/Mechanic – 1976 (Second-Service clasp)
  - John William Catchpole, Coxswain – 1988
  - Shane Gordon Coleman, Coxswain, and sole crew member of the Lowestoft Pilot boat,
    (also Second Coxswain/Mechanic of the Lowestoft lifeboat) – 1990
  - John William Catchpole, Coxswain – 1996 (Second-Service clasp)
- The Maud Smith Award 1988
  (for the bravest act of lifesaving during the year by a member of a lifeboat crew)
  - John William Catchpole, Coxswain – 1988
- The Thanks of the Institution inscribed on Vellum
  - Each of the crew of the Lowestoft lifeboat – 1922
  - Shane Gordon Coleman, Second Coxswain/Mechanic – 1996
  - John Fox, Coxswain/Mechanic – 2010
- A Framed Letter of Thanks signed by the Chairman of the Institution
  - Michael Knott – 1976
  - John William Catchpole, Second Coxswain – 1981
  - John William Catchpole, Coxswain – 1989
  - Shane Gordon Coleman, Second Coxswain/Mechanic – 1990
- Letter of Thanks signed by the Chairman of the Institution
  - Shane Gordon Coleman, Second Coxswain/Mechanic – 1989

== Lowestoft lifeboats ==
=== Lowestoft / Lowestoft No.1 Station ===
On station	ON (Note: ON is the RNLI's Official Number of the boat.)	Name	Built	Class	Comments
1801–1802	–	Unnamed	1801	30-foot Greathead	(Note: 30 ft (9.1 m) x 10 ft 6 in (3.20 m) (10-oared) Greathead-class non-self-righting lifeboat, built by Henry Greathead of South Shields, costing £165.); Transferred to Gorleston in 1802.
1807–1850	–	Frances Anne	1807	40-foot Norfolk and Suffolk (P&S)	(Note: 40 ft (12 m) x 10 ft 4 in (3.15 m) (14-oared) Norfolk and Suffolk-class non-self-righting (P&S) lifeboat, built by R. Barcham of Lowestoft, costing £350.)
1850–1868	Pre-229	Victoria	1850	42-foot Norfolk and Suffolk (P&S)	(Note: 42 ft (13 m) x 11 ft 6 in (3.51 m) (14-oared) Norfolk and Suffolk-class non-self-righting (P&S) lifeboat, built by Samuel Sparham of Lowestoft.costing £250.); Renamed Laetitia in 1868.
1868–1876	Pre-229	Laetitia	1850	42-foot Norfolk and Suffolk (P&S)	
1876–1905	22	Samuel Plimsoll	1876	44-foot 4in Norfolk and Suffolk (P&S)	(Note: 44 ft 4 in (13.51 m) x 12 ft 3 in (3.73 m) (14-oared) Norfolk and Suffolk-class non-self-righting (P&S) lifeboat, gift of the Samuel Plimsoll LB Fund (Derby and Liverpool), built by Samuel Sparham of Lowestoft, costing £276.)
1905–1921	543	Kentwell	1905	46-foot Norfolk and Suffolk (P&S)	(Note: 46-foot x 12-foot 6in Norfolk and Suffolk-class non-self-righting (P&S) lifeboat, legacy of Mrs S. A. Moore of London, built by Thames Ironworks of Blackwall, London, costing £2,197 when new.); Transferred to Gorleston No.1 in 1922.

Pre ON numbers are unofficial numbers used by the Lifeboat Enthusiast Society to reference early lifeboats not included on the official RNLI list.

=== Lowestoft No.2 Station ===
On Station	ON	Name	Built	Class	Comments
1870–1886	Pre-521	George	1869	32-foot Norfolk and Suffolk 'Surf Boat'	(Note: 32 ft (9.8 m) x 10 ft (3.0 m) (12-oared) Norfolk and Suffolk-class non-self-righting 'Surf Boat', gift of Miss Mary Ann Leicester of Bayswater, built by James Beeching of Great Yarmouth, costing £150.)
1886–1890	23	The Two Sisters, Mary and Hannah	1872	46-foot 3in Norfolk and Suffolk (P&S)	(Note: 46 ft 3 in (14.10 m) x 12 ft (3.7 m) (14-oared) Norfolk & Suffolk-class non-self-righting (P&S) lifeboat, gift of Misses S & L Harris and legacy of Mr T. Perkin, built by Samuel Sparham of Lowestoft, costing £276 when new.); Previously Sisters, on loan from Pakefield.
1890–1892	288	Stock Exchange	1890	46-foot Norfolk and Suffolk (P&S)	(Note: 46 ft (14 m) x 12 ft 9 in (3.89 m) (14-oared) Norfolk & Suffolk-class (P&S) lifeboat, gift of The Stock Exchange LB fund, built by Wm. T. Ellis of Lowestoft, costing £373.); Transferred to Gorleston No.1 in 1892.
1893–1912	356	Stock Exchange	1893	46-foot Norfolk and Suffolk (P&S)	(Note: 46 ft (14 m) x 12 ft 9 in (3.89 m) (14-oared) Norfolk & Suffolk-class non-self-righting (P&S) lifeboat, gift of The Stock Exchange LB fund, built by James Beeching of Great Yarmouth, costing £530.)

Station closed, 1912

=== Private lifeboat ===
Funded and operated by the Gorleston Volunteer Lifeboat Society

On Station	ON	Name	Built	Class	Comments
1883–1893	–	Caroline Hamilton	1883	46-foot Norfolk and Suffolk (P&S)	(Note: 48 ft (15 m) x 13 ft 2 in (4.01 m) Norfolk and Suffolk-class non-self-righting (P&S) lifeboat, funded and operated by the Gorleston Volunteer Lifeboat Society, built by Samuel R. Sparham of Lowestoft, costing £450.) Sold 1893.

=== Motor lifeboats ===
On Station	ON	Op. No. (Note: Op. No. is the RNLI's Operational Number of the boat carried on the hull.)	Name	Built	Class	Comments
1921–1939	663	–	Agnes Cross	1921	46-foot 6in Norfolk and Suffolk	Previously John and Mary Meiklam of Gladswood at Gorleston.
1939–1963	838	–	Michael Stephens	1939	46-foot Watson	Later stationed at Exmouth. Sold in 1976 and now used as a pleasure boat on the River Yealm.
1963–1986	970	–	Frederick Edward Crick	1963	47-foot Watson	
1986–1987	924	–	Archibald and Alexander M. Paterson	1955	52-foot Barnett (Mk.I)	
1987–2014	1132	47-020	Spirit of Lowestoft	1987	Tyne	On display at Chatham Historic Dockyard since June 2019.
2014–	1312	13-05	Patsy Knight	2014	Shannon	

== See also ==
- List of RNLI stations
- List of former RNLI stations
- Royal National Lifeboat Institution lifeboats
