= Great Yarmouth and Gorleston Lifeboat Station =

RNLI Lifeboat station in Norfolk, England

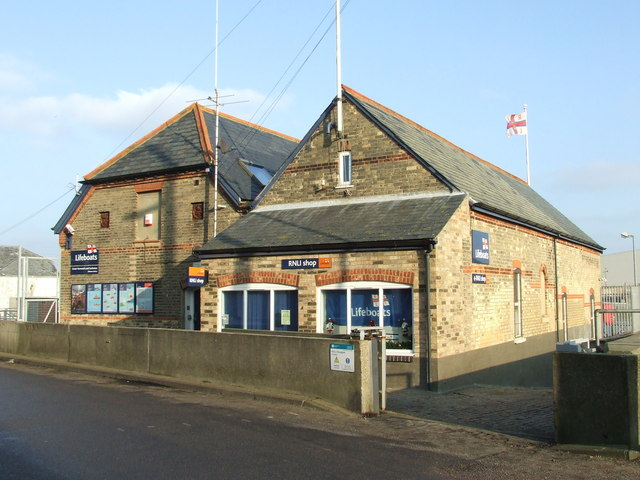
- Great Yarmouth and Gorleston lifeboat station

- Location within Norfolk

General information
- Type: RNLI Lifeboat Station
- Location: Riverside Road, Gorleston, Norfolk, England
- Coordinates: 52°34′31.51″N 1°43′55.34″E
- Opened: 1825 / RNLI 1857
- Owner: Royal National Lifeboat Institution

Website
- Gt. Yarmouth and Gorleston RNLI Lifeboat Station

Great Yarmouth and Gorleston Lifeboat Station (not to be confused with Yarmouth on the Isle of Wight) is located at Riverside Road in Gorleston, at the mouth of the River Yare, on the east coast of Norfolk.

Management of Great Yarmouth Lifeboat Station, established in 1825, was transferred to the Royal National Lifeboat Institution (RNLI) in 1857. Gorleston Lifeboat Station was established by the RNLI in 1866, although a number of other lifeboats had been in operation at Gorleston since 1802, and continued until 1939. The two RNLI branches merged in 1926, to form Great Yarmouth and Gorleston Lifeboat Station.

The station currently operates the Shannon-class All-weather lifeboat, 13-44 George and Frances Phelon (ON 1351), on station since 2026, and a B-class (Atlantic 85) Inshore lifeboat, John Rowntree (B-925), on station since 2021.

== History ==
=== Great Yarmouth ===
Great Yarmouth received its first lifeboat in 1802. No records of any call have been found. In 1825, the Norfolk Association for Saving the Lives of Shipwrecked Mariners (NASLSM) stationed its first lifeboat at Great Yarmouth. In 1833, the NASLSM established a No. 2 station, placing a second boat at Great Yarmouth.

The station was taken over by the RNLI in 1857, and the following year, two new lifeboats were sent to Great Yarmouth. The No. 1 lifeboat was a 38-foot Self-righting 'Pulling and Sailing' (P&S) lifeboat named Harriett, one with sails and (12) oars, originally built in 1852 by Beeching of Great Yarmouth, and later modified with an iron keel and wooden ballast, to Peake's design. The boat was placed on station on a trial basis, the boatmen there used to a different design lifeboat, and the 1833 lifeboat was retained for comparison. Records show that the Harriett lifeboat was only on station for one year, with the station reverting to their much preferred 1833 boat.

The second lifeboat to arrive in 1858, for the No. 2 station, was the smaller 30-foot 6-oared rowing lifeboat, named Admiral Mitchell, designed for close shore work. No details have been found of its shortcomings, but it was swiftly replaced, following the report of the RNLI district inspector. Its replacement was approved at a meeting of the RNLI committee of Management of 5 May 1859, and an unnamed 28-foot Surf lifeboat was sent to the station later that year.

A new lifeboat house at Great Yarmouth was constructed and completed in 1859, to the design of the Institute's honorary architech, Mr C. H. Cooke, at a cost of £375, (equivalent to £40,700 in 2025). Although with modification to the front, the Great Yarmouth lifeboat house mostly still exists, located on the southern corner of Standard Road and Marine Parade.

In 1866, the Institution received the anonymous gift of £620 from "X.Y.Z." of Chatham, Kent, which was appropriated to the Great Yarmouth station. In accordance with the donor's wishes, the 28-foot previously unnamed Great Yarmouth No.2 lifeboat was named Duff, after the first missionary ship that left England for the South Seas. In 1875, the lifeboat was renamed Abraham Thomas.

=== Gorleston ===
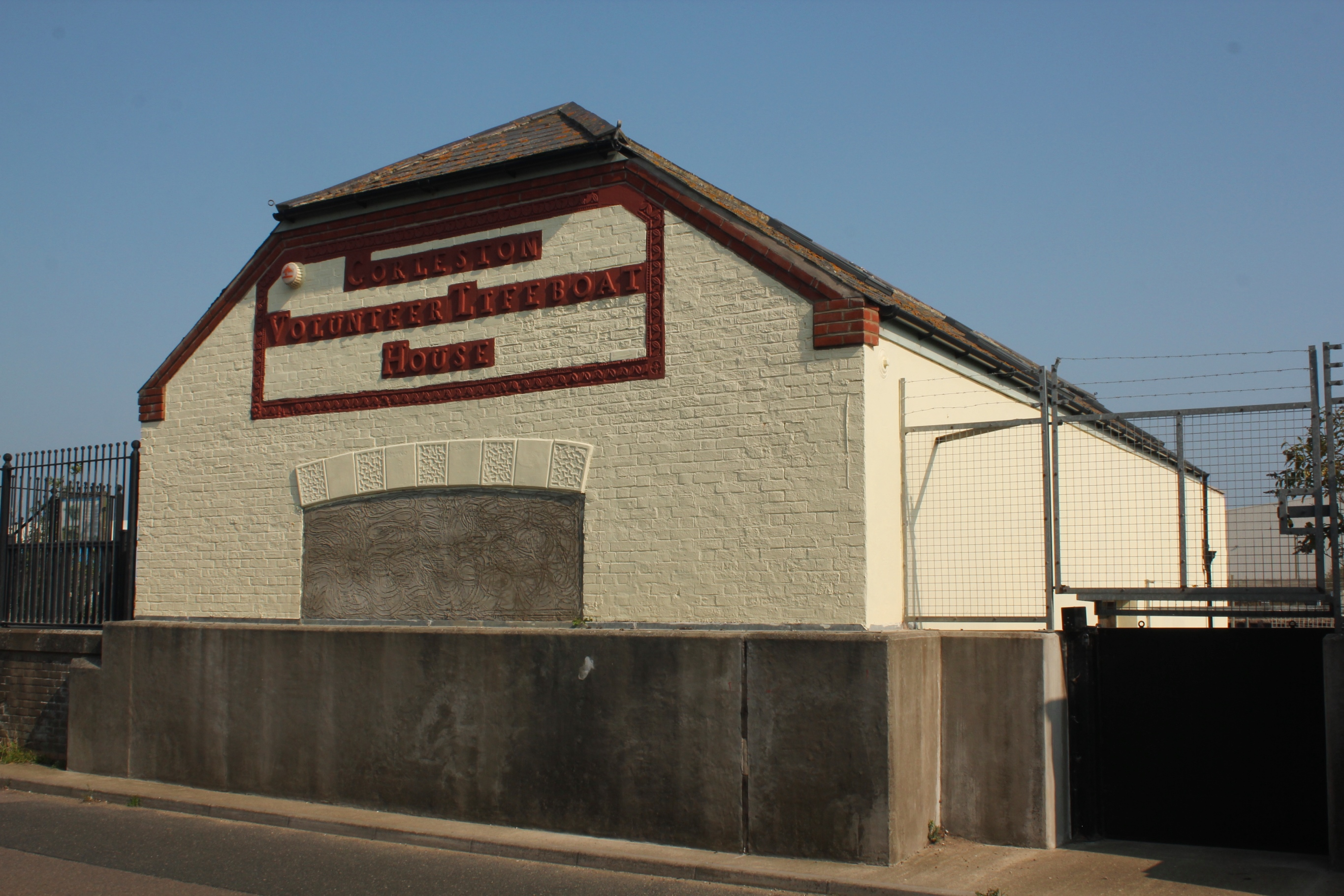
Gorleston Volunteer Lifeboat House

A private lifeboat had existed at Gorleston since 1802, operating under various banners, Gorleston Rangers, Gorleston Storm Company and Gorleston Volunteer Lifeboat Association. In October 1855, the boatmen of Gorleston Rangers, through local subscription, the assistance of friends, and with a donation of £50 from the RNLI, were able to order a 40-foot lifeboat, built by Beeching of Great Yarmouth, at a cost of £200.

Following the capsize of the private lifeboat Rescuer on 13 January 1866, (Note: The 1866 disaster occurred on 13 January 1866. The Gorleston Parish burial register confirms this date. Researchers beware! On the British Newspaper Archive are scans of 4 newspapers: the Westminster Times (9 Dec. 1865); the Hammersmith Advertiser (23 Dec. 1865); the West London Times (23 Dec. 1865); and the London & Provincial News & General Advertiser (23 Dec. 1865); all of which APPEAR to report news of the disaster in December 1865. The first thing to say is that the relevant page (in each newspaper) is identical in every way. None of them feature a date at the top of the page or a newspaper title. On further analysis it is evident that the page has been saved in the wrong digital copy of the newspapers. On the same page are at least two other stories that are both definitely from January 1866. I have made contact with the British Newspaper Archive to notify them of this issue.) resulting in the loss of 13 crew, the Gorleston boatmen appealed to the RNLI, to be supplied with a self-righting life-boat, as such a boat may not have cost so many lives. A new RNLI station was established at Gorleston in July 1866, when a new 33-foot self-righting lifeboat Leicester was dispatched to the station. The lifeboat was first exhibited in Leicester, where funds raised there had helped defray the costs. The lifeboat and carriage had been transported free of charge by the Great Northern and Great Eastern railway companies.

From the 1860s, Mr Kains-Jackson collected funds each Christmas, at the London Corn Exchange, for the Mark Lane Life-Boat Fund, to be appropriated to the Gorleston station. Three successive lifeboats at Gorleston took the name Mark Lane, which is not after a person, but after the London address of the London Corn Exchange.

In 1881 a new boathouse was built at Gorleston, at a cost of £329 (equivalent to £34,600 in 2025) and a second boathouse (Gorleston No.2) was built alongside in 1883.

During 1897 the station received its first steam lifeboat City of Glasgow (ON 362) and during 1921, its first motor-powered lifeboat.

=== Great Yarmouth and Gorleston ===
By 1919, both Great Yarmouth stations had been closed, and in 1924, the Gorleston station, which at times had as many as four lifeboats, was now operating just one lifeboat, a 46-foot 6 in motor-powered Norfolk and Suffolk type, the John and Mary Meiklam of Gladswood (ON 670). The Great Yarmouth and Gorleston branches of the RNLI merged in 1926, and the station was renamed Great Yarmouth and Gorleston Lifeboat Station. The John and Mary Meiklam of Gladswood was replaced in 1939

In 1963, a D-class (RFD PB16) Inshore lifeboat was placed at the station, joined in 1975 with the larger B-class (Atlantic 21) Inshore lifeboat Foresters (B-531). The D-class was subsequently withdrawn in 1977.

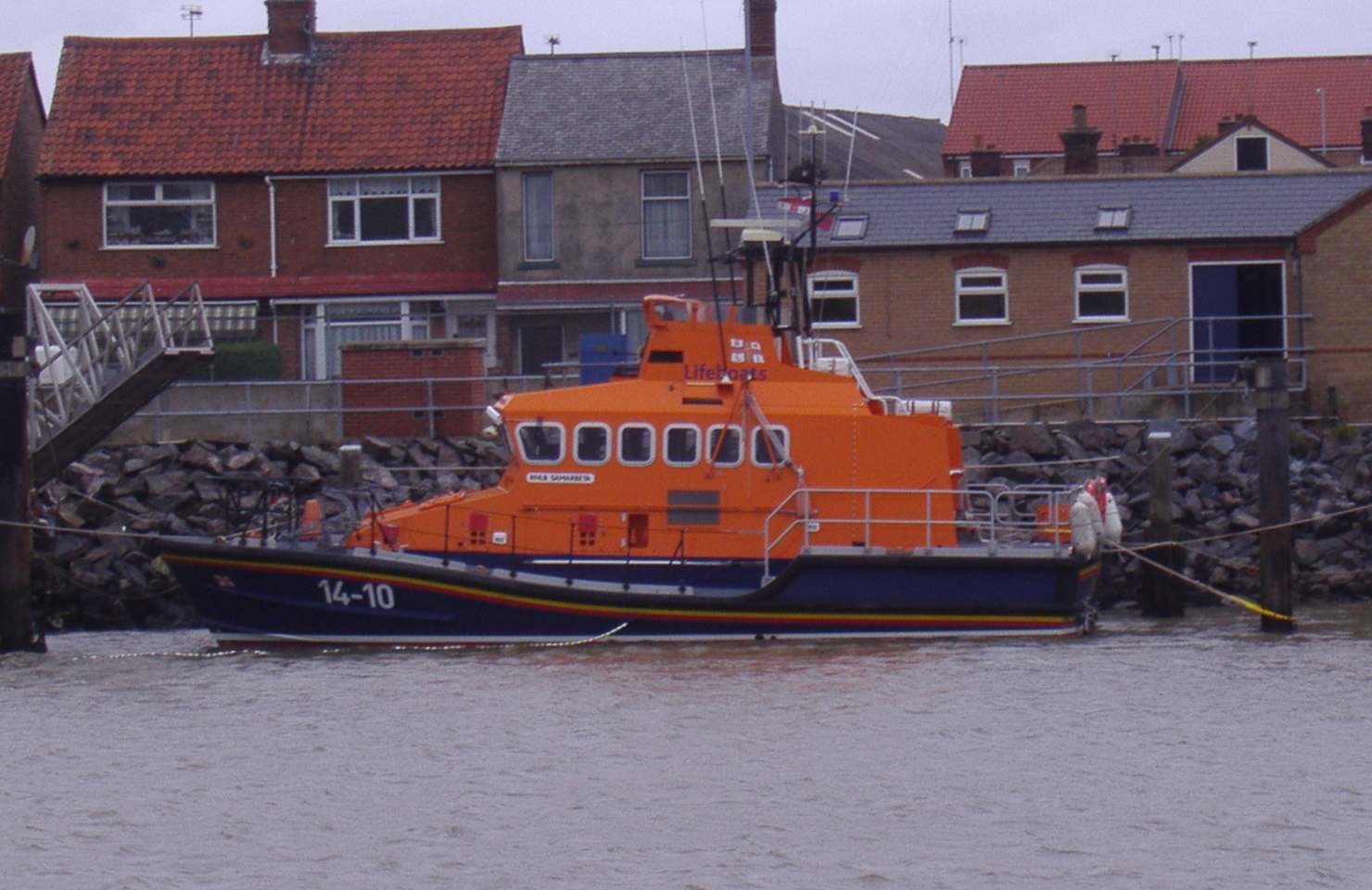
The Trent-class lifeboat Samarbeta (ON 1208) at Great Yarmouth and Gorleston.

During 1993 crew facilities were upgraded, a gift-shop built and a display area created for the former Gorleston lifeboat John and Mary Meiklam of Gladswood (ON 663). The boathouse was further extended in 2002.

In 1996, Princess Alexandra officially named the station's new Trent-class lifeboat 14-10 Samarbeta (ON 1208), Swedish for ‘working together’.

A new Shannon-class lifeboat 13-44 George and Frances Phelon (ON 1351) had been assigned to Gt. Yarmouth and Gorleston to replace Samarbeta, and was expected to be on service in 2022. She is a "Legacy Lifeboat", and carries the names of RNLI benefactors within the numbers on her hull. However, ongoing problems with the mooring at the station prevented the new lifeboat from going on service, with the boat remaining in storage. In October 2024, it was announced that George and Frances Phelon would begin operations with the relief fleet, being a training boat at Falmouth, and from December 2025, at Kilkeel.

On 27 April 2025, it was announced that an agreement had been reached, between the Great Yarmouth Port Authority and the RNLI, and that the Gt. Yarmouth and Gorleston lifeboat station will relocate upriver, to the former Pilot station. Once works are completed, it is hoped that this will provide a better mooring site for the Shannon-class lifeboat, which was due to replace the existing Trent-class lifeboat Samarbeta.

With a new mooring site now established, 13-44 George and Frances Phelon (ON 1351) returned to station on 11 April 2026, and took over operations from the Trent-class All-weather lifeboat 14-10 Samarbeta (ON 1208) at 13:44 on Saturday 13 June 2026.

== Notable rescues ==
In October 1922, after a struggle lasting 32 hours, the Gorleston pulling and sailing lifeboat Kentwell and the motor lifeboat Agnes Cross from Lowestoft station brought the whole crew of 24, and a black kitten, to safety from the steamship Hopelyn, wrecked on Scroby Sands.

In 1927, lifeboats from Great Yarmouth & Gorleston, Cromer, Southwold and Lowestoft took part in the rescue of the Dutch oil tanker Georgia. This service is considered to be one of the greatest in the history of the RNLI.

The lifeboat Louise Stephens (ON 820) was one of 19 lifeboats involved in the Dunkirk evacuation of 1940.

== Station honours ==
The following are awards made at Gt Yarmouth and Gorleston:

- Medal of the Order of the British Empire for Gallantry (EGM)
  William George Fleming – 1924
- George Cross, converted from EGM
  William George Fleming, Coxswain – 1941
- RNIPLS Gold Medal
  Capt. Chaplin, master of the steam packet Royal William – 1833
- RNLI Gold Medal
  William George Fleming, Coxswain – 1922
- RNLI Silver Medal
  Charles Salmon, Fisherman – 1855
  George Fleming, Fisherman – 1855
  Cmdr. Thomas Kisbee, RN, Chief Officer, H.M. Coastguard, Great Yarmouth – 1855
  William Johnson – 1858
  Capt. Thomas Davies, RN, Inspecting Commander, H.M. Coastguard, Great Yarmouth – 1860
  George Milligan, Coxswain – 1860
  Capt. David Robertson RN, Asst. Inspector of Lifeboats – 1870
  Edgar West Woods, Coxswain, Gorleston No.1 lifeboat – 1891
  William Todd, Coxswain, Gorleston No.2 lifeboat – 1898
  Sydney James Harris, Coxswain – 1904
  James Sclanders, Chief Engineer of the steam lifeboat – 1904
  Sydney James Harris, Coxswain Superintendent – 1905 (Second-Service clasp)
  Sydney James Harris, Coxswain Superintendent – 1909 (Third-Service clasp)
  Ellery Harris, Second Coxswain, Gorleston No.1 lifeboat – 1909
  James Cowie, Fisherman – 1910
  Sydney James Harris, Coxswain Superintendent – 1912 (Fourth-Service clasp)
  Sydney James Harris, Coxswain Superintendent – 1916 (Fifth-Service clasp)
  Edward Bensley, crew member – 1916
  William George Fleming, Coxswain – 1927
  Charles Ambrose Johnson, Coxswain – 1941
- RNLI Bronze Medal
  Samuel B. Parker (Jr), Second Coxswain – 1922
  Charles W. Chilvers, Bowman – 1922
  James Fleming, crew member – 1922
  William Gosling, crew member – 1922
  Walter Halfnight, crew member – 1922
  Arthur Harris, crew member – 1922
  Ellery Harris, crew member – 1922
  George Arthur Harris, crew member – 1922
  Charles Ambrose Johnson, crew member – 1922
  Harry Leggett, crew member – 1922
  Thomas Morley, crew member – 1922
  Albert Newson, crew member – 1922
  William Newson, crew member – 1922
  Ernest Stubbs, crew member – 1922
  James Stubbs, crew member – 1922
  (All crew of the Gorleston No.1 lifeboat)
  William George Fleming, Coxswain – 1926
  Charles Ambrose Johnson, Coxswain – 1938 (Second-Service clasp)
  Charles Ambrose Johnson, Coxswain – 1940 (Third-Service clasp)
  George Frederick Mobbs, Motor Mechanic – 1941
  Charles Ambrose Johnson, Coxswain – 1941 (Fourth-Service clasp)
  John Bryan, Coxswain/Mechanic – 1970
  John Bryan, Coxswain/Mechanic – 1975 (Second-Service clasp)
  Richard John Hawkins, Coxswain/Mechanic – 1980
  David Victor Mason, Coxswain – 1996
- Medal Service Certificate
  David Bennington, Second Coxswain – 1975
  Brian Coleman, crew member – 1975
  Herbert Appleton, crew member – 1975
- The Thanks of the Institution inscribed on Vellum
  Each of the crew of the Gorleston No.1 lifeboat – 1922
  Tugboat George Jewson – 1922
  A. B. Snell, Honorary Secretary (temp), Gorleston – 1922 (plus a set of Binoculars)
  David Bennington, Acting Coxswain – 1974
  Richard J. Hawkins, Coxswain/Mechanic – 1982
  Richard J. Hawkins, Coxswain/Mechanic – 1987
  Richard J. Hawkins, Coxswain/Mechanic – 1991
  Stephen Bartram, Assistant Mechanic – 1996
- A Framed Letter of Thanks signed by the Chairman of the Institution
  Coxswain and Crew – 1966
  Paul Carter, crew member – 1982
  David Victor Mason, Second Coxswain – 1991
  Bob Keegan – 1998 (Great Yarmouth Port Authority)
  Steve Gowing – 1998 (Great Yarmouth Port Authority)
  Simon Phillips – 1998 (Great Yarmouth Port Authority)
  Stephen Bartram, Coxswain – 2005
  Kevin Bennington, crew member – 2005
- A Collective Letter of Thanks signed by the Chairman of the Institution
  Richard Hawkins, Coxswain/Mechanic – 1996
  David Mason, Second Coxswain – 1996
  Patrick Lee, Assistant Mechanic – 1996
  David Beale, crew member – 1996
  Ian Everson, crew member – 1996
  Geoffrey Wing, crew member – 1996
- Freedom of the Borough of Great Yarmouth
  More than 100 Great Yarmouth lifeboat crew – 1983
- American Cross of Honour
  Sydney James Harris, Coxswain – 1912
- Silver watch awarded by The Queen of the Netherlands
  William George Fleming, Coxswain – 1927
- A letter of thanks from The Queen of the Netherlands
  The lifeboat crew – 1927
- The Thanks of the Royal Danish Navy
  The Institution and the crew of the lifeboat – 1952
- Member, Order of the British Empire (MBE)
  Margaret Bibby-Cheshire – 2000NYH
- British Empire Medal
  Rev. Albert Thomas Cadmore – 2024NYH

== Lifeboat disasters ==
Date	Lifeboat station	Lifeboat crew lost	Memorial	Brief details and references
1824	Great Yarmouth	5		On 23 November 1824 a boat was launched by eight Great Yarmouth beachmen in an attempt to rescue the crew of the stricken vessel Jessie. Whilst attempting to board the Jessie a heavy sea fell on board their boat which immediately sunk her and resulted in the loss of five of the crew.
1845	Great Yarmouth	7		The yawl Phoenix was wrecked whilst going to the assistance of the collier brig Ann with the loss of seven of the fifteen people on board. Survivors were rescued by the Caister Lifeboat.
1866	Gorleston	13		The private lifeboat, Rescuer, capsized in a storm with the loss of 12 of her crew on 13 January 1866. A 13th fatality occurred when rescued crew member Robert Warner succumbed just days later as a direct result of the disaster.
1867	Gorleston	6		While returning to harbour after a rescue a fishing lugger collided with the private lifeboat, Rescuer. She capsized and 6 of her crew and 19 other people drowned.
1881	Great Yarmouth	6		The lifeboat Abraham Thomas capsized on 18 January whilst attempting to rescue the mate of the schooner Guiding Star. The Abraham Thomas was struck by a heavy sea and lost six out of a crew of ten. The mate from the Guiding Star was also lost out of the lifeboat.
1888	Gorleston	4		The Refuge was a private lifeboat belonging to the Gorleston boatmen. After going to the assistance of the steamer Akaba the Refuge was being towed back to port when the tow-rope parted and she was driven onshore where she capsized with the loss of four of her seven crew. Henry Smith, chief boatman of the coastguard, was on the beach and, without thought for his own life, managed to save two crew members, Bonney and Woods, whilst a boatman of the coastguard named Henry Norton saved George Jacobs, who was found clinging to the stern post. The Yarmouth Independent newspaper report of the death of Jacob Philip Jacobs, dated 18 January 1913, states that he was one of the lifeboat crew who were saved. It is likely that Jacob Philip Jacobs and George Jacobs were the same person as the description of the rescue by the boatman are very similar.

== Great Yarmouth and Gorleston lifeboats ==
=== Great Yarmouth No.1 ===
ON (Note: ON is the RNLI's Official Number of the boat.)	Name	Built	On station	Class	Comments
–	Unnamed	1825	1825–1833	Norfolk and Suffolk (P&S)	(Note: Norfolk and Suffolk-class lifeboat, built by James Beeching of Great Yarmouth.)
Pre-160	Unnamed	1833	1833–1861	39-foot Norfolk and Suffolk (P&S)	(Note: 39-foot x 10-foot (12/14-oared) Norfolk and Suffolk-class lifeboat, built by Holmes of Great Yarmouth.)
Pre-246	Harriett	1852	1858–1859	38-foot Beeching Self-righting (P&S)	(Note: 38-foot x 10-foot (12-oared) self-righting (P&S) lifeboat, built by James Beeching of Great Yarmouth, costing £280.); Previously at Southwold. On station for evaluation purposes.
20	Brave Robert Sheddon	1861	1861–1883	40-foot Norfolk and Suffolk (P&S)	(Note: 40-foot x 11–foot 3in (12-oared) non-self-righting (P&S) lifeboat, legacy of Mrs W. S. Watson of London, built by James Beeching of Great Yarmouth, costing £100. Appropriated funds from the London Coal Exchange in 1868, rebuilt to 42-foot 3in x 11–foot 9in in 1871.); Moved to Gorleston No.1 in 1883, renamed Mark Lane.

Station closed in 1883
Pre ON numbers are unofficial numbers used by the Lifeboat Enthusiasts' Society to reference early lifeboats not included on the official RNLI list.

=== Great Yarmouth No.2 ===
ON	Name	Built	On station	Class	Comments
Pre-162	Unnamed	1833	1833–1858	25-foot Norfolk and Suffolk 'Surf Boat'	(Note: 25-foot x 8-foot (10-oared) Norfolk and Suffolk-class 'Surf-boat' non-self-righting lifeboat, built by Branford of Lowestoft.); Sold in 1858.
Pre-332	Admiral Mitchell	1858	1858–1859	30-foot Peake Self-righting (P&S)	(Note: 30-foot x 6-foot 3in (6-oared) Peake-class self-righting (P&S) lifeboat, gift of Mrs B. Wood of Eltham, built by Forrestt of Limehouse, London, costing £135.); Transferred to Skerries.
19	Unnamed	1859	1859–1866	28-foot 3 in Norfolk and Suffolk 'Surf Boat'	(Note: 28-foot 3in x 9-foot (10-oared) Norfolk and Suffolk-class non-self-righting 'Surf Boat', funded by the RNLI, built by James Beeching of Great Yarmouth, costing £179.); Renamed Duff in 1866.
19	Duff	1859	1866–1875	28-foot 3 in Norfolk and Suffolk 'Surf Boat'	(Note: Funded by an anonymous gift.); Renamed Abraham Thomas in 1875.
19	Abraham Thomas	1859	1875–1892	28-foot 3 in Norfolk and Suffolk 'Surf Boat'	(Note: Funded by the late Mrs Balderson.); Sold in 1892.
329	John Burch	1892	1892–1912	32-foot Norfolk and Suffolk 'Surf Boat'	(Note: 32-foot x 9-foot 6in (10-oared) Norfolk and Suffolk-class non-self-righting 'Surf Boat', gift of Mrs Burch of King's Lynn, built by James Beeching of Great Yarmouth, costing £227.); Sold in 1912. Renamed Crescent. Last reported as a yacht at St Olaves in the 1970s.
629	Hugh Taylor	1912	1912–1919	34-foot Norfolk and Suffolk 'Surf Boat'	(Note: 34-foot x 10-foot Norfolk and Suffolk-class non-self-righting 'Surf Boat', gift of Mrs E. Stratford of London, built by Thames Ironworks of Blackwall, London, costing £1,250.); Transferred to Pakefield.

Station closed in 1919

=== Gorleston private lifeboats (Gorleston Rangers) ===
Name	Built	On station	Class	Comments
Rescuer	1853	1853–1868	42-foot Norfolk and Suffolk (P&S)	(Note: 42-foot x 12-foot Norfolk and Suffolk-class non-self-righting lifeboat, built by James Beeching of Great Yarmouth, costing £200.)
Ranger	1856	1858–????	40-foot Norfolk and Suffolk (P&S)	(Note: 40 ft (12 m) (18-oared) lifeboat, funded by the Gorleston Ranger Co., built by James Beeching of Great Yarmouth, costing £200.); Service dates and fate unknown.
Friend of All Nations	1863	1863–1925	43-foot Norfolk and Suffolk (P&S)	(Note: 43-foot x 12-foot 2in Norfolk and Suffolk-class non-self-righting lifeboat, built by Jas. Critten of Cobholm, costing £400.)
Refuge	1866	1866–1888	42-foot Norfolk and Suffolk (P&S)	(Note: 42-foot x 12-foot Norfolk and Suffolk-class non-self-righting lifeboat, funded by the Gorleston Storm Co., constructor unknown.)
Elizabeth Simpson	1889	1889–1939	47-foot 8in Norfolk and Suffolk (P&S)	(Note: 47-foot 8in x 13-foot 6in (14-oared) Norfolk and Suffolk-class non-self-righting (P&S) lifeboat, gift of Miss Elizabeth Simpson of Stone, built by James Beeching of Great Yarmouth.); She was administered by a local committee, launched on service 119 times, and rescued 441 lives.

=== Gorleston No. 1 ===
Gorleston Lifeboat Station established by the RNLI in 1866

ON	Name	Built	On station	Class	Comments
Pre-453	Leicester	1866	1866–1870	33-foot Peake Self-righting (P&S)	(Note: 33-foot x 8-foot (10-oared) Peake-class self-righting (P&S) lifeboat, gift of the Leicester LB fund, built by Forrestt of Limehouse, London, costing £295.); Transferred to Thorpeness.
21	Leicester	1870	1870–1883	30-foot Norfolk and Suffolk 'Surf Boat'	(Note: 30-foot x 10-foot (10-oared) Norfolk and Suffolk-class non-self-righting 'Surf Boat', gift of the Leicester LB fund, built by Forrestt of Limehouse, London, costing £153.); Transferred to Gorleston No.2 station in 1883.
20	Mark Lane	1861	1883–1889	42-foot 3in Norfolk and Suffolk (P&S)	Previously Brave Robert Sheddon at Gt. Yarmouth No.1. Sold in 1889.
233	Mark Lane	1889	1889–1892	44-foot Norfolk and Suffolk (P&S)	(Note: 44-foot x 12-foot 3in Norfolk and Suffolk-class non-self-righting (P&S) lifeboat, gift of the London Corn Exchange and Baltic LB fund, built by James Beeching of Great Yarmouth, costing £315.); Placed in the relief fleet, later at Winterton.
288	Mark Lane	1890	1892–1921	46-foot Norfolk and Suffolk (P&S)	(Note: 46-foot x 12-foot 9in (14-oared) Norfolk and Suffolk-class non-self-righting (P&S) lifeboat, funded by the London Corn Exchange and Baltic LB fund, built by Wm. T. Ellis of Lowestoft, costing £373 when new.); Previously Stock Exchange at Lowestoft. Sold in 1922. Renamed Gorleston. Houseboat, broken up at Felixstowe, September 1978.
663	John and Mary Meiklam of Gladswood	1921	1921	46-foot 6in Norfolk and Suffolk (Motor)	(Note: 46-foot 6in Norfolk and Suffolk (motor) lifeboat.)
543	Kentwell	1905	1922–1924	46-foot Norfolk and Suffolk (P&S)	(Note: 46-foot x 12-foot 6in Norfolk and Suffolk-class (P&S) lifeboat, legacy of Mrs S. A. Moore of London, built by Thames Ironworks of Blackwall, London, costing £2,197 when new.); Previously at Lowestoft
670	John and Mary Meiklam of Gladswood	1923	1924–1926	46-foot 6in Norfolk and Suffolk (Motor)	(Note: 46-foot 6in Norfolk and Suffolk (motor) lifeboat.); Previously H. F. Bailey at Cromer

Station becomes Great Yarmouth & Gorleston in 1926

=== Gorleston No. 2 ===
Gorleston No.2 Boathouse built and opened in 1883.

ON	Name	Built	On station	Class	Comments
21	Leicester	1870	1883–1894	30-foot Norfolk and Suffolk 'Surf Boat'	Previously at Gorleston No.1. Sold in 1894.
371	Leicester	1894	1894–1923	31-foot Norfolk and Suffolk 'Surf Boat'	(Note: 31-foot x 9-foot (12-oared) Norfolk and Suffolk-class non-self-righting 'Surf Boat, gift of the Leicester LB fund, built by Critten of Great Yarmouth, costing £328.); Condemned and sold in 1923.
541	James Finlayson	1905	1923–1924	35-foot Watson (P&S)	(Note: 35-foot x 9-foot (10-oared) Watson-class non-self-righting (P&S) lifeboat, legacy of Mr J. Finlayson of Stirling, built by Thames Ironworks of Blackwall, London, costing £1,247.); Previously at Lossiemouth. Placed in the relief fleet, then sold in 1933.

Station closed in 1924

=== Gorleston No. 3 ===
Gorleston No.3 Boathouse constructed in 1891.

ON	Name	Built	On station	Class	Comments
326	Thora Zelma	1891	1892–1904	31-foot Norfolk and Suffolk 'Surf Boat'	(Note: 31-foot x 9-foot 3in (12-oared) Norfolk and Suffolk-class non-self-righting 'Surf Boat', gift of Mr j. McLaren-Smith of Temple, built by James Beeching of Great Yarmouth, costing £231.); Placed in the relief fleet, then sold in 1913.

Station closed 1904

=== Gorleston No. 4 ===
ON	Name	Built	On station	Class	Comments
362	City of Glasgow	1894	1897–1898	Steam	
Station Closed 1898–1903
420	James Stevens No.3	1898	1903–1908	Steam	

Station closed in 1908

=== Great Yarmouth and Gorleston ===
==== All-weather lifeboats ====
ON	Op. No. (Note: Op. No. is the RNLI's Operational Number of the boat carried on the hull.)	Name	Built	On station	Class	Comments
670	–	John and Mary Meiklam of Gladswood	1923	1926–1939	46-foot 6in Norfolk and Suffolk (Motor)	Previously H.F. Bailey at Cromer
820	–	Louise Stephens	1939	1939–1967	46-foot Watson	
1002	44-003	Khami	1967	1967–1980	Waveney	
1065	44-021	Barham	1980	1980–1996	Waveney	
1208	14-10	Samarbeta	1995	1996–2026	Trent	Withdrawn on 13 June 2026.
1351	13-44	George and Frances Phelon	2022	2026–	Shannon	

More post-service details can be found on the respective lifeboat class pages.

==== Inshore lifeboats ====
===== D-class =====
Op. No.	Name	On station	Class	Comments
D-9	Unnamed	1963–1964	D-class (RFD PB16)	
D-32	Unnamed	1964	D-class (RFD PB16)	
D-1	Unnamed	1965	D-class (RFD PB16)	
D-73	Unnamed	1965–1967	D-class (RFD PB16)	
D-26	Unnamed	1967–1968	D-class (RFD PB16)	
D-113	Unnamed	1968–1969	D-class (RFD PB16)	
D-179	Unnamed	1970–1977	D-class (RFD PB16)	Later named Blue Peter IV at St Agnes

===== Arancia-class =====
Op. No.	Name	On station	Class	Comments
A-48	Margaret and Bruce	2011–2012	Arancia	
A-77	Kingfisher	2012–2020	Arancia	

===== B-class =====
Op. No.	Name	On station	Class	Comments
B-531	Foresters	1975–1988	B-class (Atlantic 21)	
B-574	Joseph B Press	1988–2002	B-class (Atlantic 21)	
B-786	Seahorse IV	2002–2021	B-class (Atlantic 75)	
B-925	John Rowntree	2021–	B-class (Atlantic 85)	

== See also ==
- List of RNLI stations
- List of former RNLI stations
- Royal National Lifeboat Institution lifeboats
