= William Fleming (lifeboatman) =

British lifeboatman (1865-1954)

William George Fleming GC
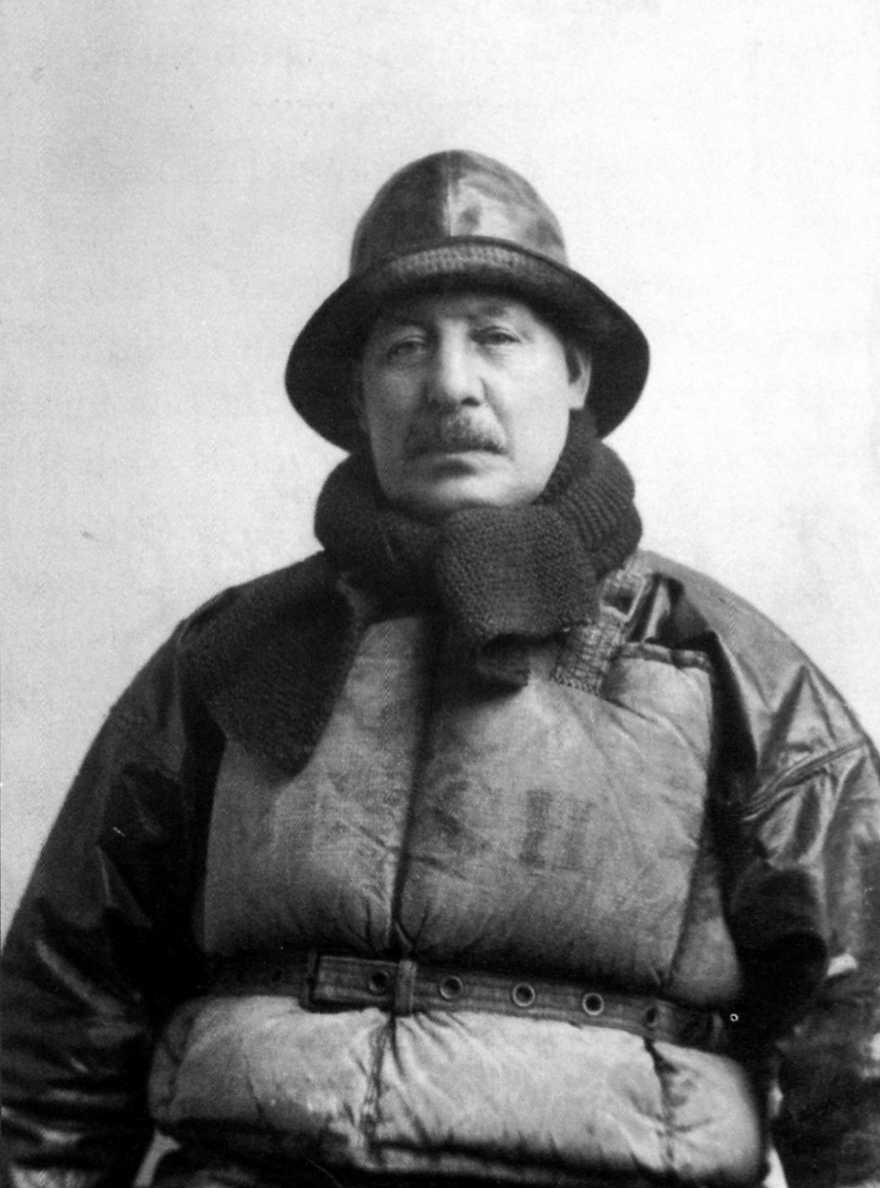
- William Fleming GC
- Born: 1865; Gorleston-on-Sea, Norfolk, England
- Died: 1954 (aged 88–89); Gorleston-on-Sea
- Occupations: Seaman; Coxswain of the Gorleston lifeboat (1922-1934)
- Organization: RNLI

William George Fleming GC (1865–1954) was a lifeboatman from Gorleston-on-Sea on the east coast of Norfolk, England. His service with the Royal National Lifeboat Institution (RNLI) spanned nearly fifty years, in which time he won the George Cross and the RNLI Medal in Gold and in Silver, and the Bronze Medal three times.

== Early life ==
William "Billy" Fleming was born in Gorleston-on-Sea in 1865. As a young man, he worked as an ordinary seaman, working on small sailing vessels on the east coast of England. He is recorded on the 1881 census as a seaman working on the Charlotte Cole. He lived for most of his life in Pavilion Road, Gorleston, just a small distance from the lifeboat station. He joined the crew of the Great Yarmouth and Gorleston lifeboat in the mid-1880s.

== Coxswain ==
Billy Fleming served on the Gorleston lifeboat through the latter years of the 19th century, and the first four decades of the 20th century. He was in his late 50s when he became coxswain in 1922, a post he held until 1934. Over his 49 years of service he helped to rescue 1,188 people.

== Notable rescues ==
During his lifeboat career Billy had been involved in many services of note.

=== SS Hopelyn ===
In 1922 Fleming's lifeboat, the un-motorised rowing craft Kentwell, went to the rescue of the collier Hopelyn, which had run aground on Scroby Sands in a severe gale. Kentwell was unsuccessful in her efforts to get the crew of 24 from Hopelyn to safety, after the lifeboat was damaged against the hull of Hopelyn. After returning to shore Fleming and some of his crew, although exhausted, volunteered to join the Lowestoft motor-powered lifeboat Agnes Cross as she launched to continue the rescue, aware that their expert knowledge of conditions on Scroby Sands and the surrounding waters could be invaluable. The whole crew of Hopelyn, and the ship's cat, were eventually rescued by Agnes Cross.

=== Awards ===
Fleming's 49 years with the lifeboat service were marked by courageous acts that placed him second only to Henry Blogg of Cromer in the list of Norfolk's most decorated lifeboat men. Over the space of five years, Fleming attained a full set of the RNLI's awards for gallantry. He was awarded a RNLI Gold Medal for his part in the rescue of Hopelyn, with fifteen Bronze Medals presented to other lifeboatmen. In 1926 he was awarded a bronze medal for the rescue of four seamen from the ketch Henrietta. In 1927 he received a silver medal for the part the lifeboat John and Mary Meiklam of Gladswood, played in the rescue of the Dutch oil tanker Georgia, when she was stranded on Haisborough Sands. (Note: The crew of the Georgia were taken off by the Cromer lifeboat under Henry Blogg) He was also awarded a silver watch by the Queen of the Netherlands for standing by Georgia.

In addition, in 1924 Fleming was awarded the Empire Gallantry Medal for the Hopelyn rescue, which he exchanged for the newly created George Cross in 1941. As a George Cross recipient he received the Queen Elizabeth II Coronation Medal in 1953.

=== Legacy ===
A blue "heritage" plaque to commemorate William G. Fleming GC was unveiled on Monday, 23 October 2017 at 11 Pavilion Road, Gorleston, where he lived whilst serving as coxswain.

In December 2019 the Finance Shop, a local firm offering independent financial advice, relocated to custom-built premises on Morton Peto Road on the Harfrey's Industrial Estate in Great Yarmouth. This new building, William Fleming House, was named in honour of Coxswain William "Billy" Fleming.

== See also ==
- Great Yarmouth and Gorleston lifeboat station
