= Lossiemouth Lifeboat Station =

Former RNLI lifeboat station in Moray, Scotland

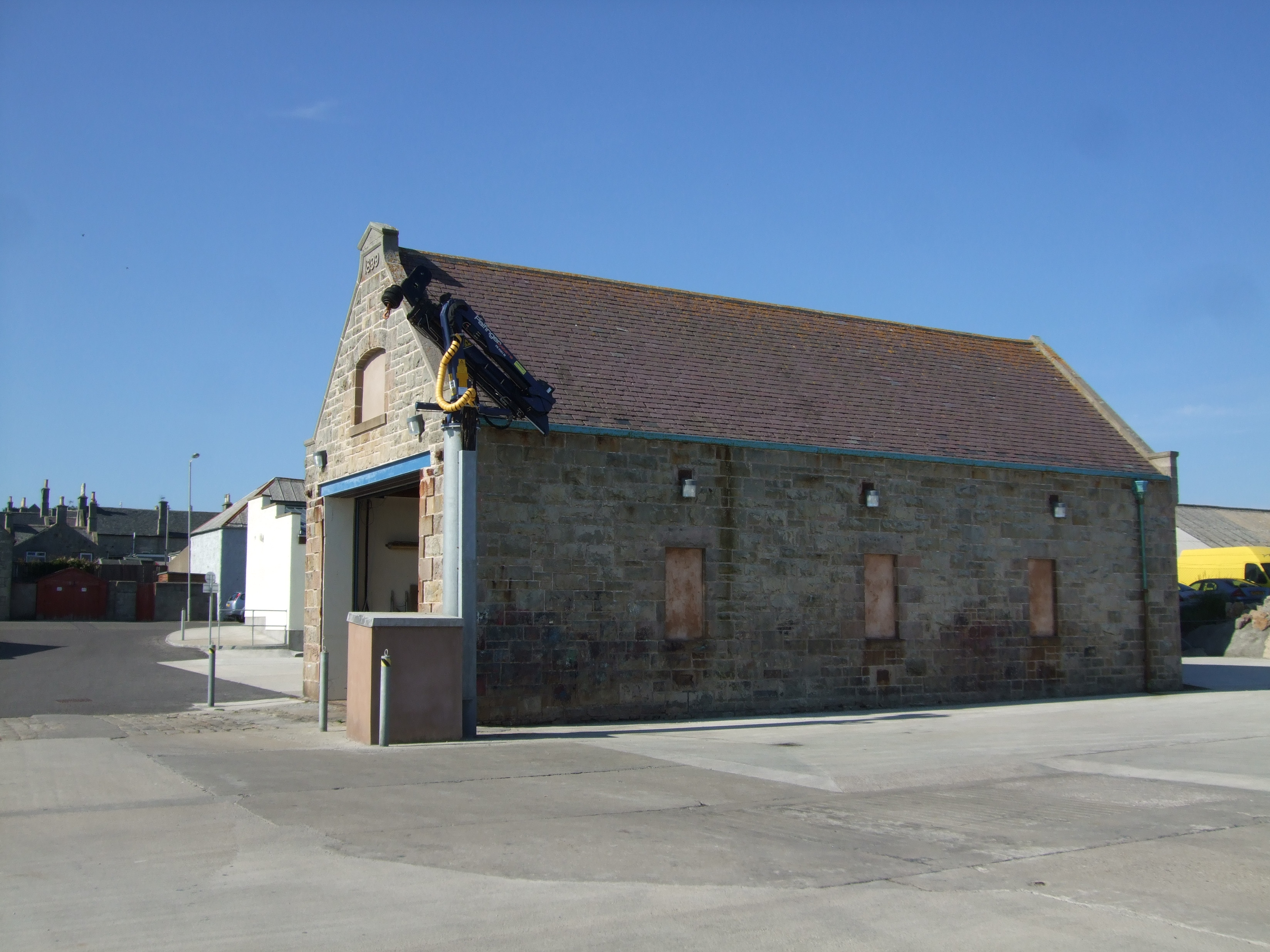
- 1899 Lifeboat House at Lossiemouth, Moray

- Lossiemouth, Moray

General information
- Status: Closed
- Type: RNLI Lifeboat Station
- Location: Lossiemouth, Moray, IV31 6QE, Scotland
- Coordinates: 57°43′28.1″N 3°17′03.1″W
- Opened: 22 March 1859
- Closed: 1923

Lossiemouth Lifeboat Station was located in Lossiemouth, a harbour town sitting midway between Inverness and Fraserburgh on the Moray coast, formerly Elginshire, in north-east Scotland.

A lifeboat was first stationed at Lossiemouth in 1859, by the Royal National Lifeboat Institution (RNLI).

After being in operation for 64 years, Lossiemouth Lifeboat Station closed in 1923.

== History ==
On 2 October 1855, the schooner Thor of Leith drifted from her moorings, and went ashore. A Lossiemouth coastguard brought ashore a boy in his boat. He then swam out to the vessel with a line, and found the Master intoxicated, locked in his cabin. He broke open the door, and forcibly brought the Master on deck, secured him to a lifebuoy, and dropped him in the sea, from where he was pulled ashore. Ever since its founding in 1824, the Royal National Institution for the Preservation of Life from Shipwreck (RNIPLS), later to become the RNLI in 1854, would award medals for deeds of gallantry at sea, even if no lifeboats were involved. Boatman William Gruer, H.M. Coastguard, was awarded the RNLI Silver Medal.

At the meeting of the RNLI committee of management on 2 December 1858, it was decided to establish a lifeboat station at Lossiemouth, on the north-east coast of Scotland. "As many accidents happen to the fishing-boats on this part of the coast, in addition to occasional wrecks, it is thought that a life-boat may be of much service here."

In the RNLI journal 'The Lifeboat' of 1 July 1859, it was reported that a 30-foot self-righting 'Pulling and Sailing' (P&S) lifeboat, with both (6) oars and sails, costing £140-1s, along with its launch carriage, had been transported to Lossiemouth, arriving on 22 March 1859. Transportation of both boat and carriage had been provided free of charge, aboard a steamship belonging to Mr A. Dunn of Lime Street, London. A boathouse was constructed at the end of High Street, next to the harbour draw-bridge.

The schooner Agnes, bound for Thurso from Lossiemouth, was spotted at daybreak, having run ashore about 1 mile (1.6 km) to the east of Lossiemouth. The lifeboat was launched, but in the rough conditions, the 6-oared lifeboat struggled to make headway. Lifeboat crew were washed overboard more than once, fortunately managing to regain the boat each time. The crew exhausted, the lifeboat returned to harbour, and a fresh crew set out, finally managing to reach the wreck, and saving the three crew of the Agnes.

The difficulties of an under-powered lifeboat were resolved the following year in 1866, with the provision of a new 32-foot 10-oared lifeboat, along with a new carriage and equipment. The funds were provided by the Bristol Histrionic Club, who had organised a grand fete at the Bristol Zoological Gardens in Clifton, along with various musical and dramatic events for fundraising. It would be the second lifeboat funded by the group, having already provided a lifeboat for Padstow, the Albert Edward, named after H.R.H. the Prince of Wales. Before being sent to Lossiemouth, the lifeboat was transported to Bristol free of charge by the Great Western railway company, and then taken in a grand procession to the Zoological Gardens, where it was formally named Bristol and Clifton, before being launched into the small lake, and its self-righting capabilities demonstrated. The lifeboat as then conveyed to Lossiemouth, again at no cost, by the Midland, London and North Western, Caledonian, and Great North of Scotland Railway Companies.

A new lifeboat house was constructed off Shore Street at the end of the harbour in 1899, at a cost of £660, with a slipway into the new harbour basin, directly in front of the boathouse.

The RNLI committee of management meeting in July 1923 considered the special report from Northern District Inspector, Commander E. D. Drury. Since 1883, only one life-saving service had taken place at Lossiemouth, in 1895. The Lossiemouth Harbour was overwhelmingly congested, often preventing launch of the lifeboat, and since 1920, the station had been forced to close between January and May each year. The intended erection of a lifeboat shelter to allow launching at all times had not materialised. In winds from north, to east-south-east, it was virtually impossible for the lifeboat to leave the harbour, and a motor-powered lifeboat had been placed at Buckie in 1922. It was decided to close Lossiemouth Lifeboat Station.

Both boathouses still stand; the 1899 boathouse is currently a Marine Workshop. The lifeboat on station at the time of closure, James Finlayson (ON 541), was transferred to Gorleston No.2 station. It was reported at the time, that the station's service boards were to be placed in the harbourmaster's office. AS of 2025, the service boards can be found in the Lossiemouth Fisheries and Community Museum.

== Station honours ==
The following are awards made at Lossiemouth:

- RNLI Silver Medal

William Gruer, Boatman, H.M. Coastguard – 1855

== Lossiemouth lifeboats ==
=== Pulling and Sailing (P&S) lifeboats ===
| ON (Note: ON is the RNLI's Official Number of the boat.) | Name | Built | On station | Class | Comments |
|---|---|---|---|---|---|
| Pre-343 | Unnamed | 1859 | 1859−1866 | 30-foot Peake Self-righting (P&S) | (Note: 30-foot x 6-foot 3in (6-oared) Peake-class self-righting (P&S) lifeboat, built by Forrestt of Limehouse, London, costing £140.) |
| Pre-471 | Bristol and Clifton | 1866 | 1866−1887 | 32-foot Prowse Self-righting (P&S) | (Note: 32-foot x 7-foot 6in (10-oared) Prowse-class self-righting (P&S) lifeboat, gift of the Bristol & Clifton Histrionic Club, built by Forrestt of Limehouse, London, costing £259.) |
| 119 | Frances Sprot | 1887 | 1887−1905 | 34-foot Self-righting (P&S) | (Note: 34-foot x 7-foot 6in (10-oared) self-righting (P&S) lifeboat, legacy of Miss F. Sprot of Edinburgh, built by Woolfe of Shadwell, London, costing £381.) |
| 541 | James Finlayson | 1905 | 1905−1923 | 35-foot Watson (P&S) | (Note: 35-foot x 9-foot (10-oared) Watson-class non-self-righting (P&S) lifeboat, legacy of Mr J. Finlayson of Stirling, built by Thames Ironworks of Blackwall, London, costing £1,247.) |

Pre ON numbers are unofficial numbers used by the Lifeboat Enthusiasts' Society to reference early lifeboats not included on the official RNLI list.

== See also ==
- List of RNLI stations
- List of former RNLI stations
- Royal National Lifeboat Institution lifeboats
