= SS Georgia (1908) =

Oil tanker lost at Haisborough Sands off the coast of Norfolk, England

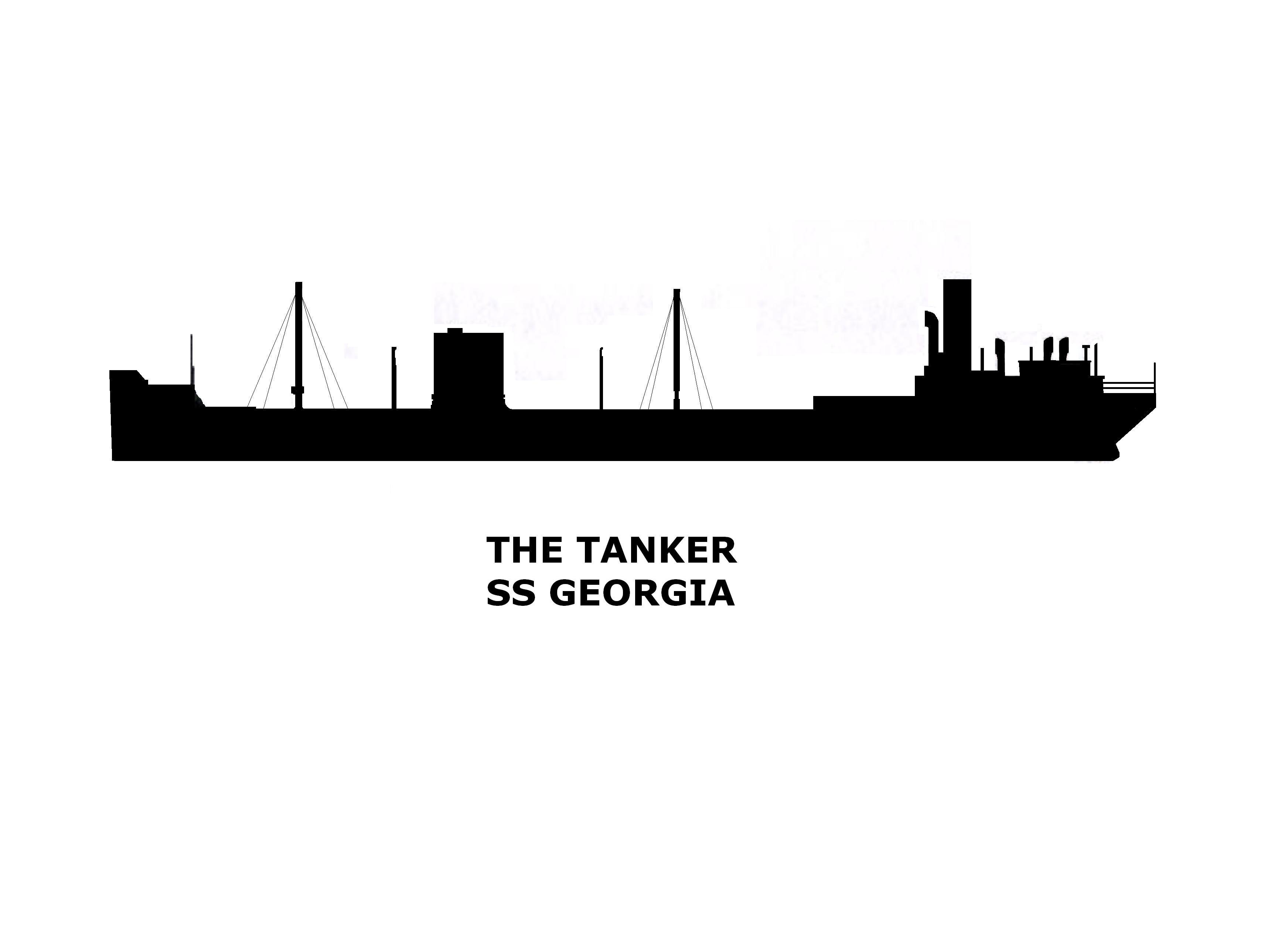
- Profile of SS Georgia

History
- Name: 1908: Texas; by 1917: Georgia
- Owner: 1908: The Texas Company; 1927 NV Dutch Tanker & Oil Co
- Port of registry: 1908: (United States) Port Arthur, Texas; 1927: (Netherlands) Amsterdam
- Builder: Newport News SB & DD Co, Newport News
- Yard number: 82
- Launched: 24 April 1908
- Maiden voyage: 18 July 1908
- Identification: 1908: US official number 205362; code letters KWQL; 1918: call sign KUR; 1927: code letters NTBH
- Fate: grounded 20–21 November 1927

General characteristics
- Type: oil tanker
- Tonnage: 1910: 5,106 GRT, 3,746 NRT; 1927: 5,111 GRT, 3,194 NRT
- Length: 389.4 ft (118.7 m)
- Beam: 52.1 ft (15.9 m)
- Depth: 29.1 ft (8.9 m)
- Decks: 1
- Installed power: 391 NHP
- Propulsion: 1× screw; 1 × triple-expansion engine
- Crew: 31 (when lost)

SS Georgia was an oil tanker that was built in the United States in 1908 as Texas and spent most of her career in the United States Merchant Marine. In 1917 she was renamed Georgia. In 1927 she was transferred to Dutch ownership, and shortly thereafter ran aground and was lost on Haisborough Sands off the coast of Norfolk, England.

== History ==
Newport News Shipbuilding and Drydock Company built the ship at Newport News, Virginia as hull number 82. She was launched as Texas on 24 April 1908 and delivered to her owners, The Texas Company (now Texaco) on 18 July 1908.

The Texas Company registered the ship at Port Arthur, Texas. Her US official number was 205362 and her code letters were KWQL.

By 1917 the ship had been renamed Georgia and was equipped for wireless telegraphy. By 1918 her call sign was KUR.

In February 1918 she was inspected for possible United States Navy service and assigned the Identification Number (ID) 2316. The Navy ordered her acquisition, but it was cancelled shortly before the Armistice of 11 November 1918, and she remained in commercial service.

In 1922 it was reported that the ship's name had been changed to Texaco.

By 1927 the NV Dutch Tanker & Oil Company Ltd owned her, and had registered her in Amsterdam. Her Dutch code letters were NTBH.

== Final voyage ==
In September 1927 Georgia loaded a cargo of crude oil at Abadan in Persia (now Iran). She left the Persian Gulf bound for the oil refinery at Grangemouth, Scotland.

By 20 November she was in the North Sea when a strong gale broke her steering gear. Just before midnight she ran aground on Haisborough Sands and stuck fast. The storm carried away her radio aerial, so her wireless telegraphist was unable to send a distress signal. For several hours the heavy sea battered her hull, eventually ripping her apart amidships. Her after section was sounding her siren as a distress signal, but the two halves slowly drifted apart and lost sight of each other, the stern section being carried away by the force of the gale.

The bow section remained stuck on the sand bank with huge seas washing over it. The bow section had the captain, Harry Kissing and 14 of the crew all crouched in the forecastle. The other 16 members of the crew were in the drifting stern section. The next morning (21 November) the steamship Trent sighted the drifting stern section and rescued the 16 crewmen. Trent then found the bow section stuck on the sand bank. In the meantime, the stern section had drifted North West and was sighted off Cromer.

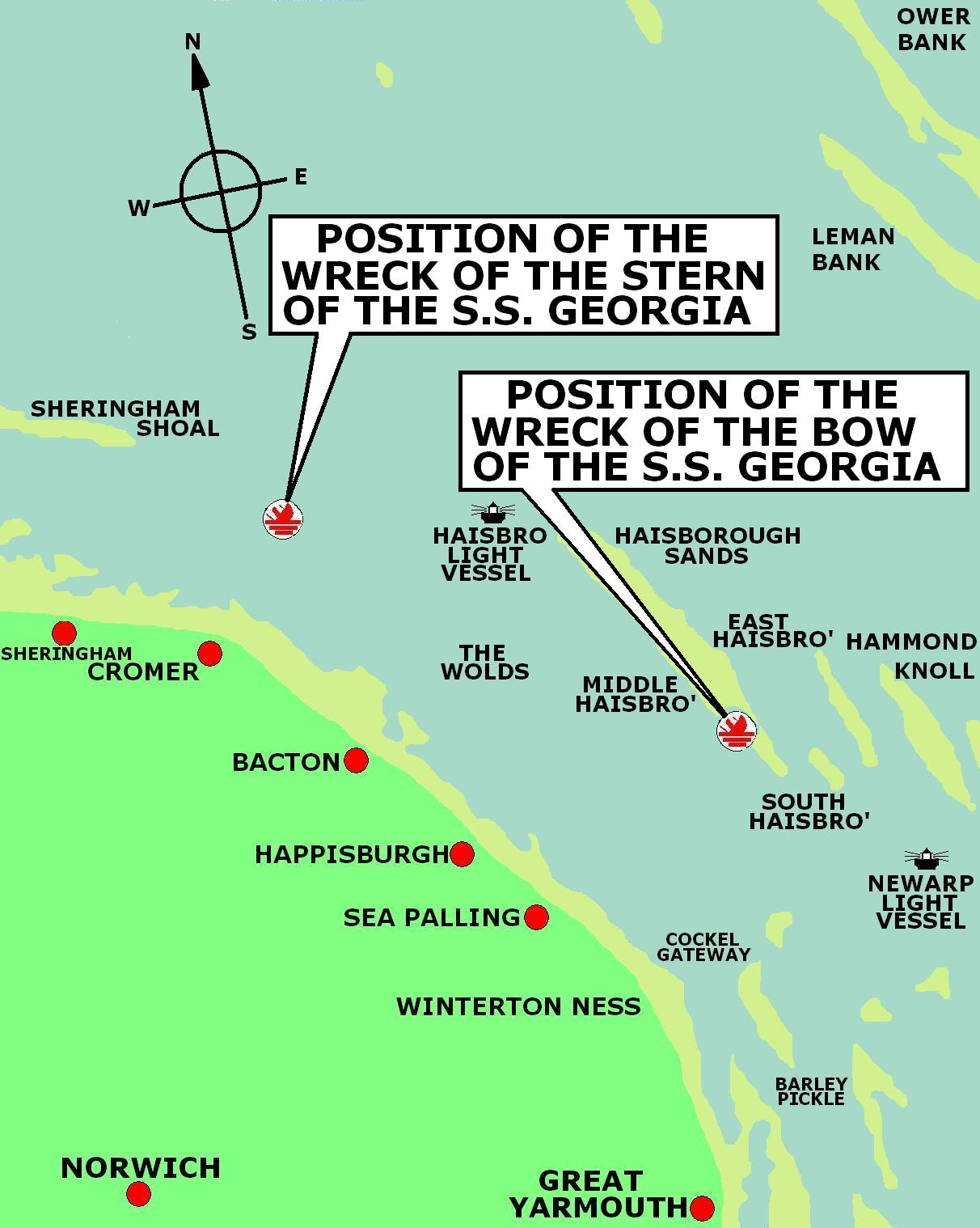
Position of the two halves of SS Georgia

Henry Blogg, coxswain of the Cromer lifeboat H F Bailey, attending to the stern reported at 3.15 p.m. that the ship had been abandoned although at this time they were unaware that the ship was in two halves as the stern was creeping higher into the air. The Cromer lifeboat attended the stern section all that night warning shipping of the danger. Back at the bow section, the Great Yarmouth Coastguard had learned of the disaster at 9 p.m. and had called the Gorleston lifeboat to assist. Trent had signalled by wireless that it was too dangerous to approach the stern section, and she made for Cromer to land the rescued men from the stern section.

On the morning of 22 November the Gorleston lifeboat, John and Mary Meiklam of Gladswood, tried to rescue the remaining 15 crew, now sheltering in the chartroom, the highest point on the ship out of the water. Coxswain Billy Fleming tried to use the lee provided by the close by Trent, but with the seas still heavy this proved to be too dangerous, and she stood off to wait until conditions improved. Another attempt was made at midday. On the fifth attempt they got a line to the stranded section, but a huge wave picked up the lifeboat and dropped her in a trough, snapping the line. The Gorleston boat then developed engine trouble and retired from the rescue.

At about 4.30 pm the remaining crew were finally rescued by the exhausted crew of the Cromer lifeboat. Blogg and his crew had stood by the stern section all night, and then after returning to Cromer, were immediately called back out to attend the bow. H F Bailey was considerably damaged in the rescue, but got her crew and the rescued men safely back to Great Yarmouth by 7 pm. Both sections of Georgia sank in the following days.

== Positions of the wrecks ==
Stern section 52°58′36″N 001°21′37″E at a depth of 17 m (56 ft).

Bow section 52°52′54″N 001°46′16″E at a depth of 10 m (33 ft), on Haisborough Sands.

== Bibliography ==
- Jolly, Cyril (1981). The Loss of the English Trader. Acorn Editions. ISBN 0-906554-06-3.
- Jolly, Cyril (2002). Henry Blogg, the Greatest of the Lifeboatmen (new ed.). Poppyland Publishing. ISBN 0-946148-59-7.
- Leach, Nicholas; Russell, Paul (2004). Cromer Lifeboats 1804–2004. Tempus Publishing. ISBN 0-7524-3197-8.
- Lloyd's Register of British and Foreign Shipping. Vol. I–Steamers. London: Lloyd's Register of Shipping. 1910 – via Internet Archive.
- Lloyd's Register of Shipping. Vol. I–Steamers. London: Lloyd's Register of Shipping. 1917 – via Internet Archive.
- Lloyd's Register of Shipping. Vol. I–Steamers and Motorships. London: Lloyd's Register of Shipping. 1927 – via Internet Archive.
- The Marconi Press Agency Ltd (1918). The Year Book of Wireless Telegraphy and Telephony. London: The Wireless Press, Ltd.
- Tikus, Ayer (2004). The Ship-wrecks off North East Norfolk. Ayer Tikus Publications. OCLC 654937740.
