= SS Hopelyn =

Merchant vessel from Newcastle

History

United Kingdom
- Name: Hopelyn
- Owner: Hopemount Shipping Co Ltd
- Operator: Stamp, Mann & Co Ltd
- Port of registry: Newcastle upon Tyne
- Builder: Swan Hunter & Wigham Richardson Ltd, Sunderland
- Yard number: 1041
- Launched: 20 December 1917
- Completed: February 1918
- Identification: UK official number 140706; code letters JSHV
- Fate: Stranded and wrecked, 18 October 1922

General characteristics
- Type: cargo ship
- Tonnage: 2,348 GRT, 1,301 NRT
- Length: 285.3 ft (87.0 m)
- Beam: 41 ft 6 in (12.65 m)
- Draught: 19.1 ft (5.8 m)
- Installed power: 249 NHP
- Propulsion: 3 cylinder triple-expansion engine
- Crew: 24

SS Hopelyn was a merchant ship from Newcastle that became stranded and then wrecked on Scroby Sands of the Norfolk coast on 17 October 1922.

== History ==
Hopelyn was a merchant steamship which was built in 1918 at Swan Hunter & Wigham Richardson Ltd Sunderland, England with the Yard Number 1041. She was 2,348 gross register tons (GRT) and 285 feet (87 m) long. The ship was ordered by the Hopemount Shipping Company Ltd, (a subsidiary of Swan, Hunter Ltd & Wigham Richardson Ltd) and operated by Stamp, Mann and Company shipping mainly coal from Newcastle.

== Final voyage and loss ==
Hopelyn left Newcastle on 17 October 1922 with a cargo of 3,400 tons of coal and a crew of twenty four plus the ship's cat called Tishy, bound for London. As she made her way down the east coast of England she encountered a north-easterly gale. On the morning of 18th the Hopelyn encountered problems when her steering gear broke down. Temporary repairs were made to the steering but the gale had gradually increased making conditions increasingly worse by the hour. The captain decided that it would be safer for his ship and crew to head for the relative safety of Yarmouth roads. Unfortunately the temporary repairs failed and the captain could not control the ship. The strong gale and crashing seas drove the Hopelyn on to the north Scroby Sands where she became stranded at position 52°37′N 01°47′E.

The captain immediately asked the wireless telegraphist to send out a Mayday. This he managed to do, just before the heavy sea caused the wireless mast to be swept away. It was now 9:30 pm and the Hopelyn was breaking up fast. The crew of 24 took shelter in the Bridge but after a short while had to move to the highest point of the ship's superstructure, the 12-foot square wireless room.

Following the Mayday being received by the coastguard, the Gorleston and Caister lifeboats were launched. The Caister boat was unable to make headway into the waves and gale which was blowing from north east. and after an hour signalled "unable to get away". At Gorleston, the Kentwell also only powered by oars experienced the same problem. Coxswain Billy Fleming acquired a tow from the tug George Jewson and reached the Hopelyn around midnight. The two vessels found conditions at sea difficult with 30 to 40-foot waves. As the lifeboat approached the Hopelyn, coxswain Fleming sent up flares to highlight the ship's position. By now the Hopelyn's back was broken and she was beyond any idea of salvage. The crew of the lifeboat were concerned to see that only a small section of the ship was showing above the heavy seas. The crew were also concerned that they could see no sign that the crew were still alive and on board the Hopelyn. Equally coxswain Fleming had no reason to assume that the crew had perished or left the ship. With this in mind, Fleming held his position right through the night. At daybreak, after ten hours at sea, Fleming and his crew could still not see or hear any sign of life on the wreck and so Fleming made the decision to return to shore. Within one hour of the lifeboats return to Gorleston, the coxswain received word from the Caister coastguard that a makeshift flag had been hoisted from the funnel of the Hopelyn.

Fleming and his crew once again set out for Scroby sands with the aid of the tug. The Kentwell had got to one hundred yards of the ship when a large wave had thrown the lifeboat back on to the sands. A second attempt was made with the result that the Kentwell was thrown violently against the hull of the Hopelyn causing serious damage to the lifeboat, so much so that Fleming had to get his boat clear of the wreck and sands and return to shore.

The Inspector of Lifeboats for Eastern District, Commander Carver, had arrived. He telephoned the Lowestoft station for help and the motor lifeboat Agnes Cross was launched with its coxswain Jack Swan at the helm. It collected Commander Carver and made for the Hopelyn

The two lifeboats met at some point between the wreck and Gorleston. Fleming, who had now been at sea for close to sixteen hours, transferred on to the Agnes Cross. With the help and guidance of Fleming, the Lowestoft lifeboat now approached the Hopelyn as darkness closed in. It was too dark and the Agnes Cross returned to shore.

It was now the morning of 21 October and the Agnes Cross left her home port at 4:30 with a mixture of Lowestoft and Gorleston crewmen. The gale was still blowing strong. Once back at the wreck of the Hopelyn, coxswain Swan manoeuvred his lifeboat alongside the Hopelyn holding it in position with great skill. Quickly the crew of the ship left the wireless room and scrambled down ropes on to the Agnes Cross. One of the crewmen carefully cradled the ship's black cat 'Tishy' as he boarded the lifeboat. The Agnes Cross was however fouled by her cable on the wreck, as it was cut free, a huge wave caught her broadside and nearly capsized her. The rescue had taken a total of thirty hours, two lifeboats, one tug but all 23 crewman, the captain and the ship's cat had all been rescued safely.

Hopelyn's wreck lies at a depth of 2 m (6.6 ft).

== Awards ==
Twenty-six medals (two gold, two silver and 23 bronze) were awarded to the lifeboatmen of Kentwell and Agnes Cross

For their part in the rescue William Fleming and John Sterry Swan were both awarded the Royal National Lifeboat Institution Gold Medal A silver medal was awarded to the motor mechanic R Scott and fourteen bronze to the Lowestoft crew and nine bronze to the Gorleston crew. Commander Carver was awarded the silver medal. The Gorleston station secretary was given the Thanks of the RNLI on vellum and a pair of binoculars, the tug was given the thanks on vellum.
