= Scroby Sands =

English coastal sand bank

- Shoal
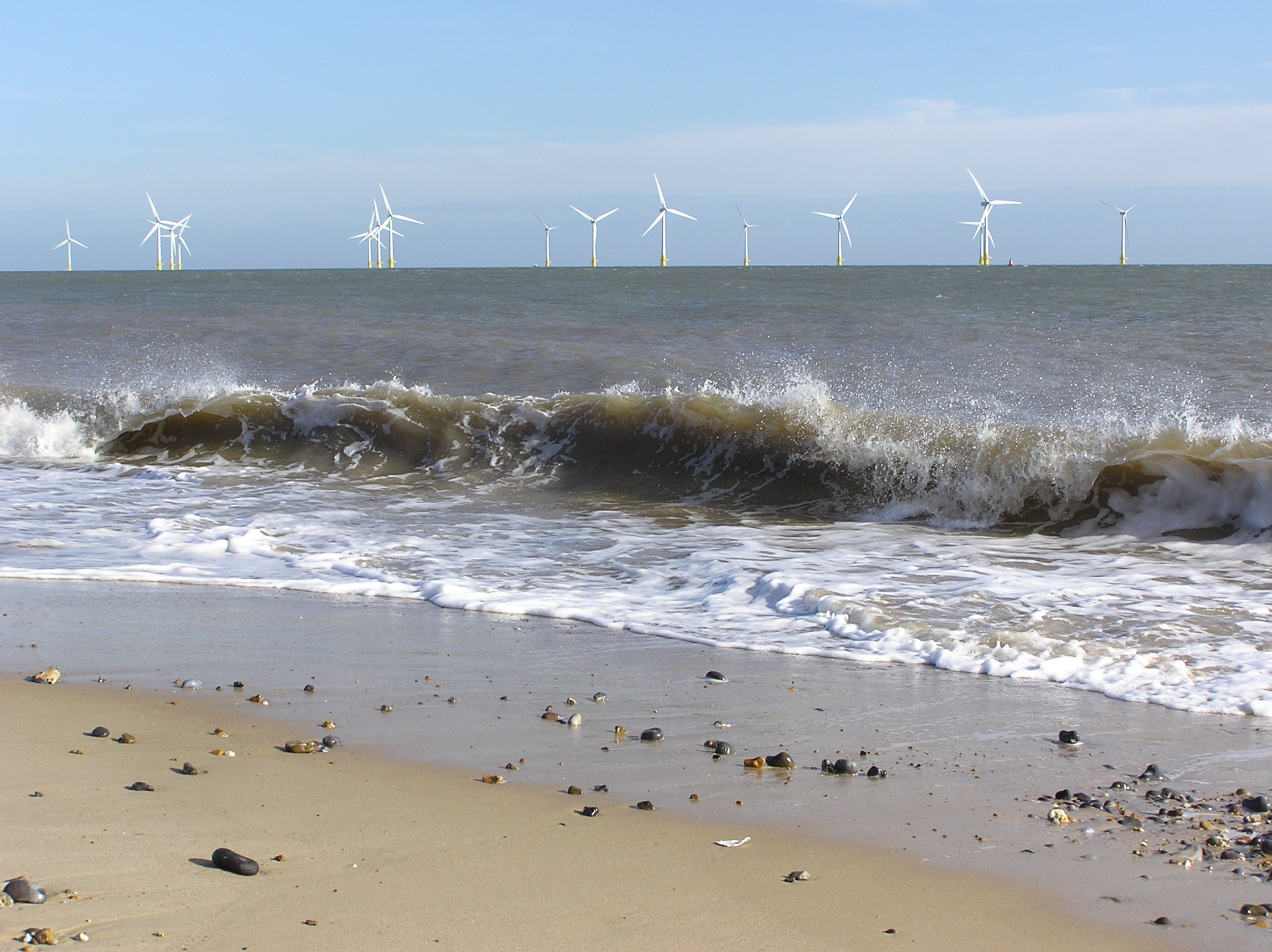
- Scroby Sands and its Wind Farm
- Interactive map of Scroby Sands
- Coordinates: 52°38′56″N 1°47′25″E
- Location: Southern North Sea, Norfolk, United Kingdom

Scroby Sands is a sandbank off the coast of Norfolk, England which runs near shore, north to south from Caister south towards Great Yarmouth. It has been the site of many shipwrecks. Scroby Sands Wind Farm, an offshore 60 MW wind farm, is situated on the sandbank and opened in 2003.

== Description ==
Scroby Sands is 4 miles (6.4 km) from the coast and separated by channels from the adjacent Caister shoals, Cockle Shoals, Cross Sands, Corton and Holm Sands. Scroby sands is frequently shown on charts as having three components, named North Scroby, Middle Scroby and South Scroby.

It comprises a large group of shoals with Scroby Sands itself being the largest near shore sandbank in the group. It is deeper and narrower at its northern end and shallower and broader at its southern end.

== Wind farm ==
The sands are the site of the Scroby Sands wind farm which was erected in 2003–04. The farm was commissioned by Powergen Renewables Offshore, a division of one of the UK's major electricity producing companies (now called E.ON UK), and is expected to produce up to a maximum of 60 megawatts of power, enough for 41,000 homes.

== Ships wrecked on Scroby Sands ==
Some of the ships wrecked here include:

- Sequena wrecked October 1995
- SS Hopelyn wrecked on 17 October 1922.
- SS Eastward stranded then wrecked 25 March 1918
- SS Douglas and SS Sinloo both wrecked after colliding on Cross sands on 28 January 1905
- Steamer Sea Queen wrecked 13 February 1870
- Durham Packet of Stockton wrecked on 6 December 1847

== See also ==
- Haisborough Sands
- Hammond's Knoll
