= Awards of the Royal National Lifeboat Institution =

The National Institution for the Preservation of Life from Shipwreck was established on 4 March 1824, becoming the Royal National Institution for the Preservation of Life from Shipwreck (RNIPLS) on 20 March 1824, when it received royal approval from King George IV. The Institution became the Royal National Lifeboat Institution (RNLI) on 5 October 1854.

Ever since its inception in 1824, a number of awards have been established by the Institution, both for gallantry at sea, and for service to the Institution. None are approved by the Crown, and are therefore unofficial awards. As such, they do not appear in the official British order of wear, although the principal lifesaving award, a Medal of the RNLI, can be worn on the right breast in uniform by members of the British armed forces.

== RNIPLS / RNLI awards ==
=== Gallantry Medal ===
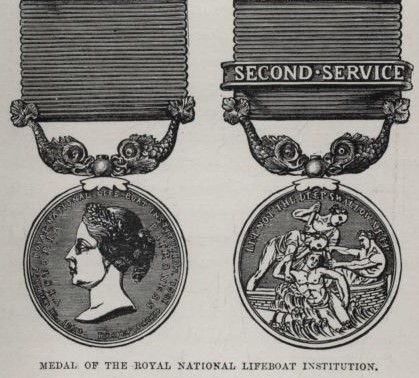
RNLI Medal, version awarded 1862–1902

Ribbon: RNLI Medal and Decoration

The medal was established in 1824, to reward "humane and intrepid exertions in saving life from shipwrecks on our coasts, deemed sufficiently conspicuous to merit honourable distinction". The medal can be awarded in gold, silver and, since 1917, in bronze.

While awards are now usually made to lifeboat crew, they have been made to anyone for their efforts to save life at sea. A considerable number of awards were made in the nineteenth century to coastguard officers, for their efforts in coastguard boats, lifeboats, or even as part of a Rocket brigade. Awards were made to civilians who affected a rescue by wading or swimming into the sea from the shore. In 1991, the RNLI Bronze Medal was awarded to the skipper of the salmon workboat Challenge, for a rescue effected at Burra, Shetland.

Apart from the metal of manufacture, the design of the three classes is the same. When established in 1824, the obverse bore the effigy of King George IV, the first patron of the Institution. In 1862 this was changed to a profile of Queen Victoria, with changes to Edward VII in 1902 and George V in 1911. In 1937 Royal permission to portray George VI was refused, as the award is not granted by the Crown, and since then the profile of the RNLI founder Sir William Hillary has been used. The reverse, designed by William Wyon, shows three sailors in a lifeboat rescuing a fourth from the sea, below the inscription "Let not the deep swallow me up" taken from Psalm 69. The reverse of the Edward VII version shows a figure of Hope adjusting the lifejacket of a lifeboatman. The original reverse was restored for issues from 1911. The medal is engraved on the edge with the name of the recipient and the date the award was approved.

The very first medals were presented without any means of suspension, and then with a suspension loop for the plain dark blue ribbon. Second-Service awards for these early medals came in the form of a lifeboat, which would be suspended on a chain from the medal. Since about 1852, the current suspension, in the form of two dolphins, has been used, and Second-Service awards in the same class have been recognised by clasps attached to the ribbon.

Up to 2004, a total of 150 gold, 1,563 silver and 791 bronze medals had been awarded. Recipients of the Silver Medal have included Grace Darling, who achieved national fame in 1838 when she took part in her lighthouse keeper father's rescue of nine people whose ship had run aground off the coast of Northumberland coast. Her father, William Darling, also received the Silver Medal.

=== RNLI Decoration ===
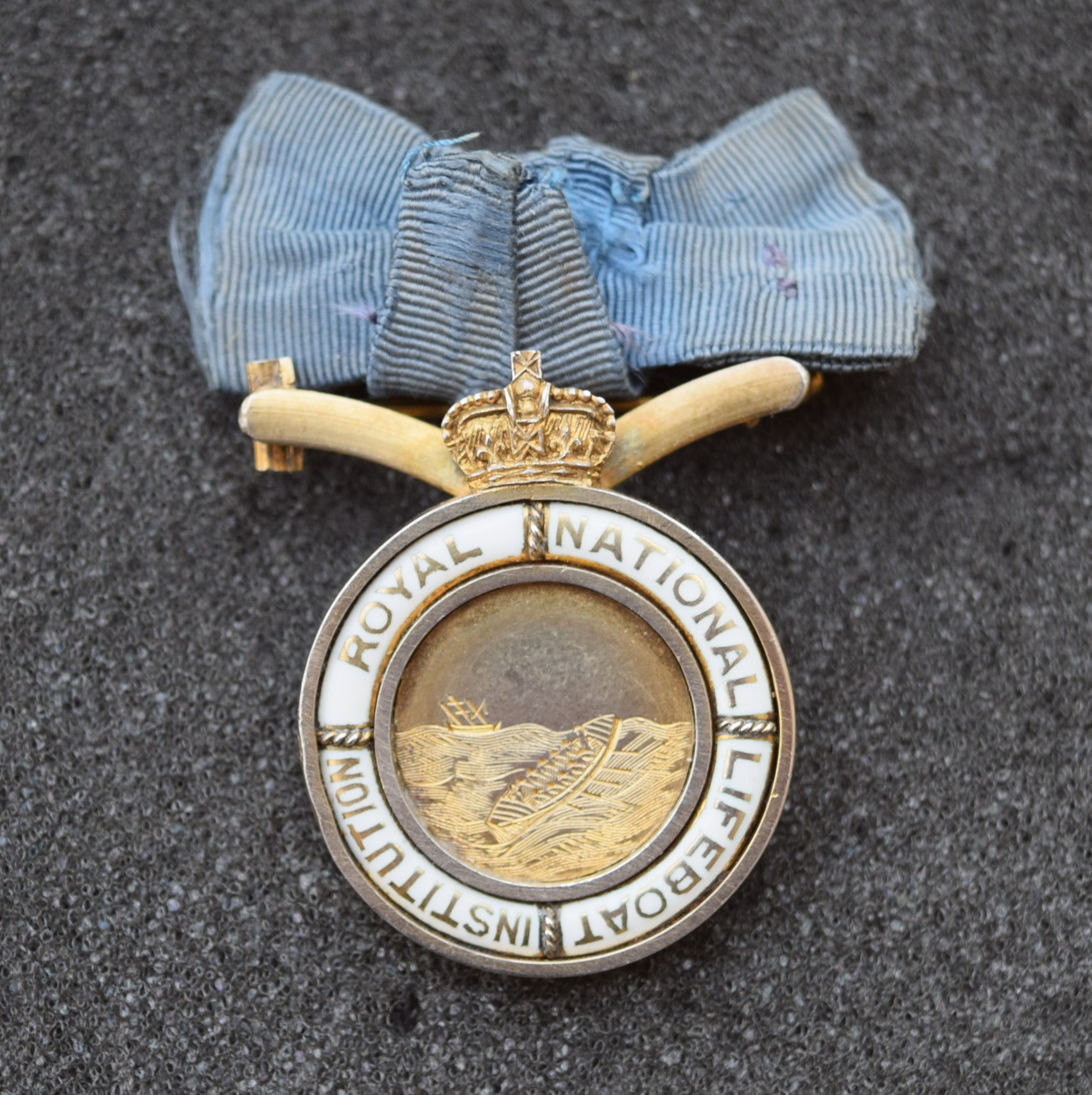

The Decoration of the Institution was awarded for conspicuous and special services to the RNLI, other than actual personal life-saving. Established in 1901, many awards were made for long and devoted service by Branch Honorary Secretaries and Ladies Auxiliaries.

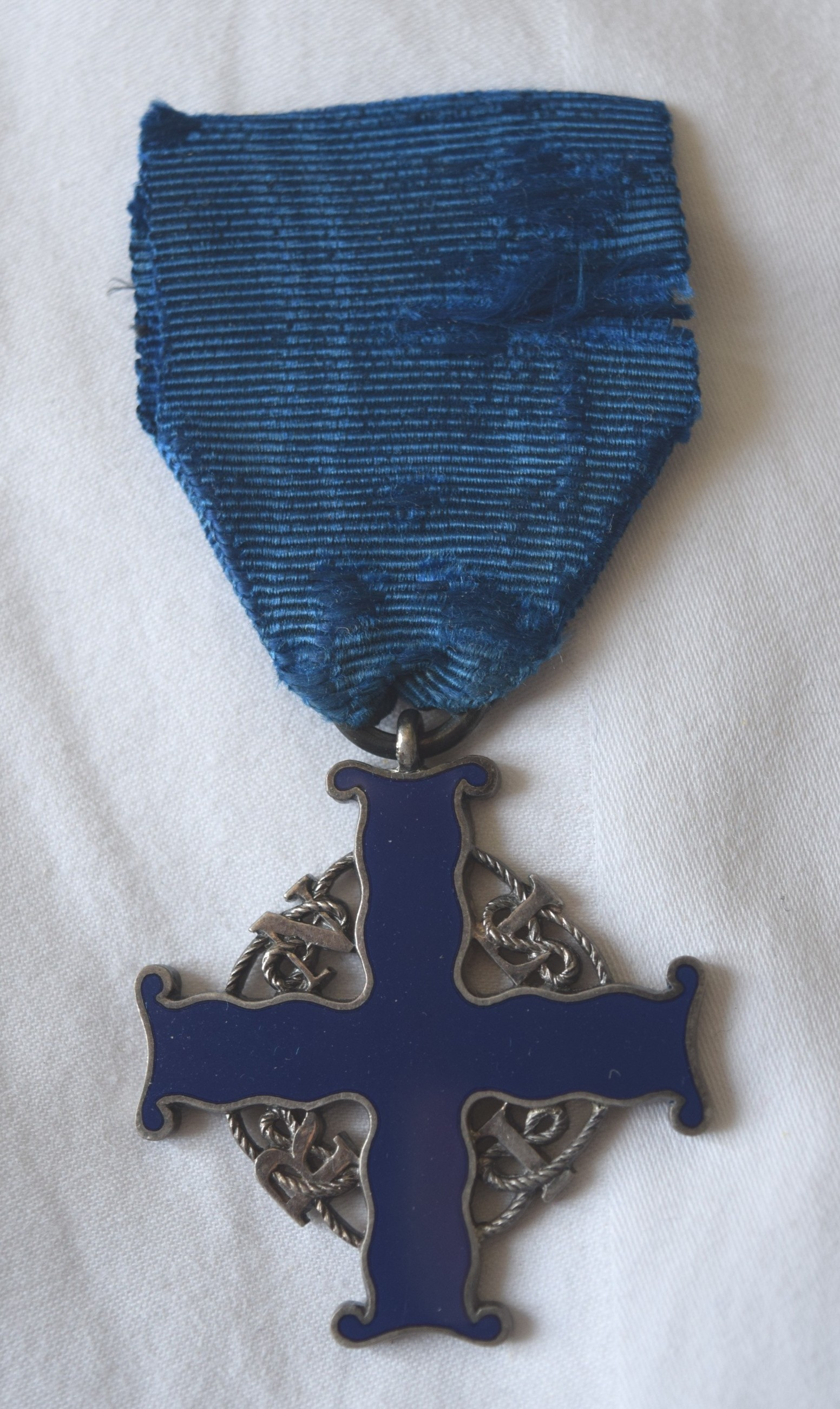

The decoration of 1901 was a circular gilt medal 27mm in diameter and surmounted by a crown. It depicts a lifeboat going to the assistance of a sailing ship in distress, surrounded by a white enamel lifebelt bearing the words Royal National Lifeboat Institution. The reverse in plain. It is suspended from a plain dark blue ribbon, shaped in a bow when worn by women.

The 1912 design, manufactured by Garrard & Co of London, was designed as a medal, with a stylised cross in dark blue enamel, with the letters R N L I in the angles of the cross, interlaced with a rope, produced in gold first-class awards, and silver second-class awards.

Initially approved by King George V under the assumption he was confirming the approval of the late King Edward VII, this was later rescinded in May 1914, after objections were raised by the King that the decoration, a private award without Royal sanction, conflicted with the principle of the Crown as the fount of honour.

=== Other awards ===
Notable service that does not justify the award of a medal can be rewarded with either the "Thanks of the Institution Inscribed on Vellum" or a "Framed Letter of Appreciation".

The RNLI have also established a number of awards that can be awarded to groups, including boat crews. Examples include the Ralph Glister Award, inaugurated in 1968, awarded annually to a rescue boat crew who have given outstanding service; and the Walter and Elizabeth Groombridge Award, established in 1986, given annually for the most meritorious rescue carried out by an inshore lifeboat crew.

=== RNLI Long Service Medal ===
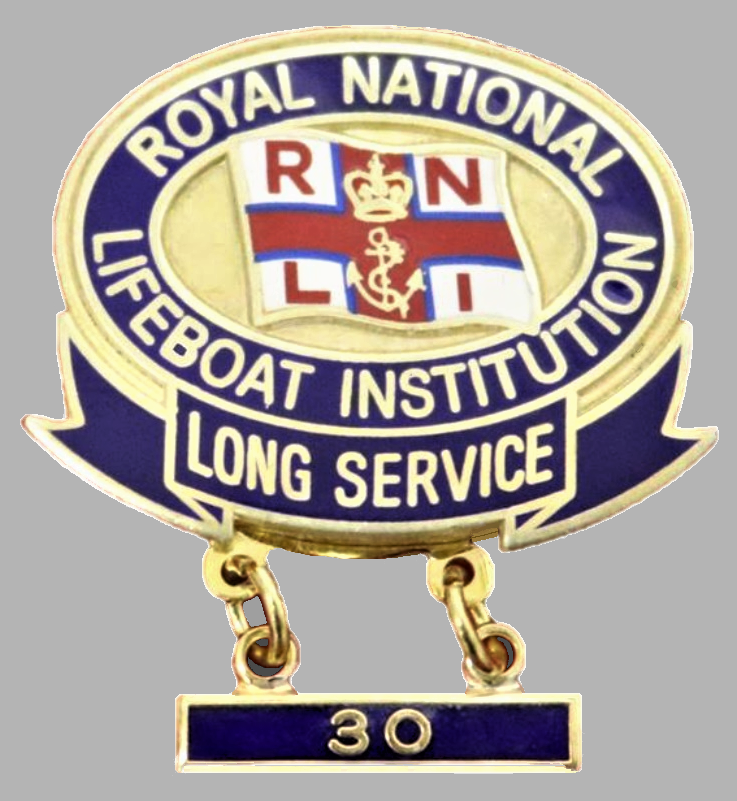
RNLI Long Service awards
Above: Lapel badge, awarded to 2020
Right: Medal with 60 year clasp

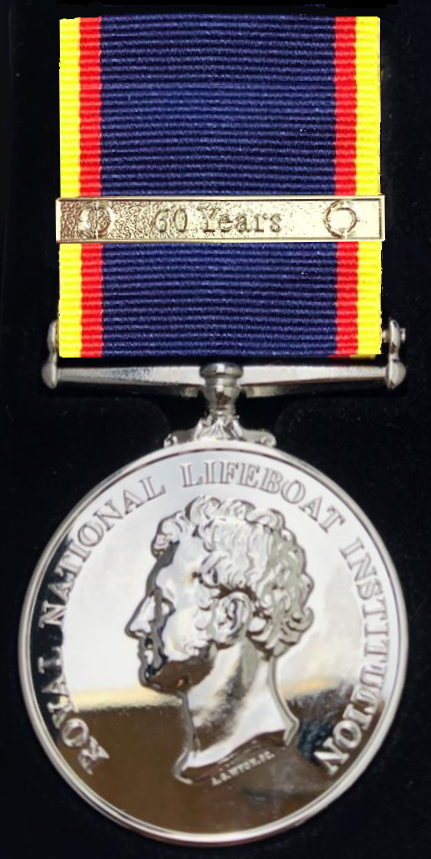

Established in 2020, it is awarded for twenty years service with the RNLI, either as crew or as a support volunteer, and replaces the award of enamel lapel badges. Clasps, attached to the ribbon, are presented to mark each further period of ten years service. Clasps are inscribed 30, 40 50 or 60 Years, as appropriate. By September 2020, a total of 733 medals had been issued, including several with the 60 Year clasp.

The medal is circular and is struck in silver-plated base metal. The obverse shows the left-facing bust of the RNLI founder Sir William Hillary, surrounded by the words Royal National Lifeboat Institution. The reverse shows a representation of two outstretched hands clasped above a raging sea with, on a surrounding band, the inscription "With courage nothing is impossible". Each medal is named to the recipient on the rim. The ribbon, suspended from a fixed straight suspender, is navy blue with narrow red and yellow edges, the colours of the RNLI.

== Official awards to the RNLI ==
Members of the RNLI have also received a number of official awards, both for gallantry and distinguished service. These include Henry Blogg and William Fleming who both received, in addition to a number of RNLI awards, the George Cross; and Edward Parker and Howard Primrose Knight, both awarded the Distinguished Service Medal for their "gallantry and determination when ferrying troops from the beaches" during the 1940 Dunkirk evacuation.

Members of the RNLI are regularly appointed to the Order of the British Empire, including awards of the British Empire Medal, for both maritime safety and charitable services. In addition, serving RNLI lifeboat crew with five years operational service were eligible for the Queen's Jubilee Medals of 2002, 2012 and 2022, and the Coronation Medal of 2023, on the same basis as members of government run emergency services.

== Sources and further information ==
- Cox, Barry, ed. (1998). Lifeboat Gallantry, The Complete Record of Royal National Lifeboat Institution Gallantry Medals and how they were won. 1824-1996. Spink & Son Ltd., London. ISBN 0907605893.
- "Journal". The Lifesaving Awards Research Society (110). The Lifesaving Awards Research Society: 1–155. August 2024.
- Dorling, Captain H. Taprell (1956). Ribbons and Medals. A.H.Baldwin & Sons, London.
- Duckers, Peter (2013). British Military Medals. Pen & Sword Books Limited. ISBN 978-1-47382-983-1.
- Farrell, Tony (December 2020). "Royal National Lifeboat Institution Long Service Medal". Orders & Medals Research Society Journal. 59 (2). ISSN 1474-3353.
- Mussell, J., ed. (2014). Medals Yearbook – 2015. Token Publishing Limited, Devon. ISBN 978-1-908828-16-3.
- Myers, J.A.L. (June 2003). "Golden Jubilee Medal – Royal National Lifeboat Institution". Orders & Medals Research Society Journal. 42 (2). ISSN 1474-3353.
- "The Medal of the Royal National Life-Boat Institution". The Life-Boat. 4 (36). April 1860.
- "The Decoration of the Institution". The Life-Boat. 20 (224). May 1907.
- "Lifeboats and Lifeguards In Action". The Life-Boat. 59 (570). Winter 2004–05.
- "Groombridge Award". The Life-Boat. 61 (593). Autumn 2010.
