= Skegness Lifeboat Station =

RNLI Lifeboat station in Lincolnshire, England

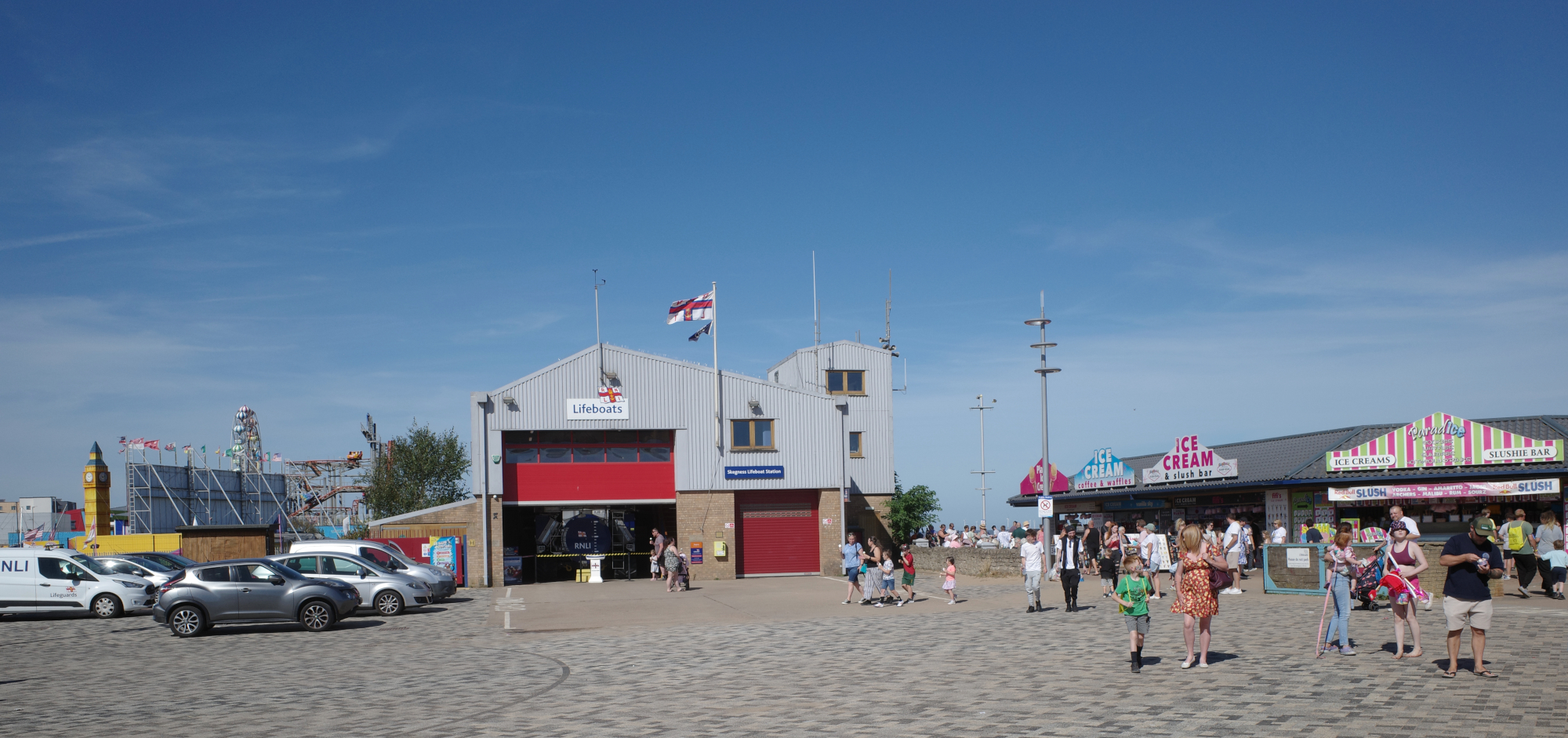
- Skegness Lifeboat Station

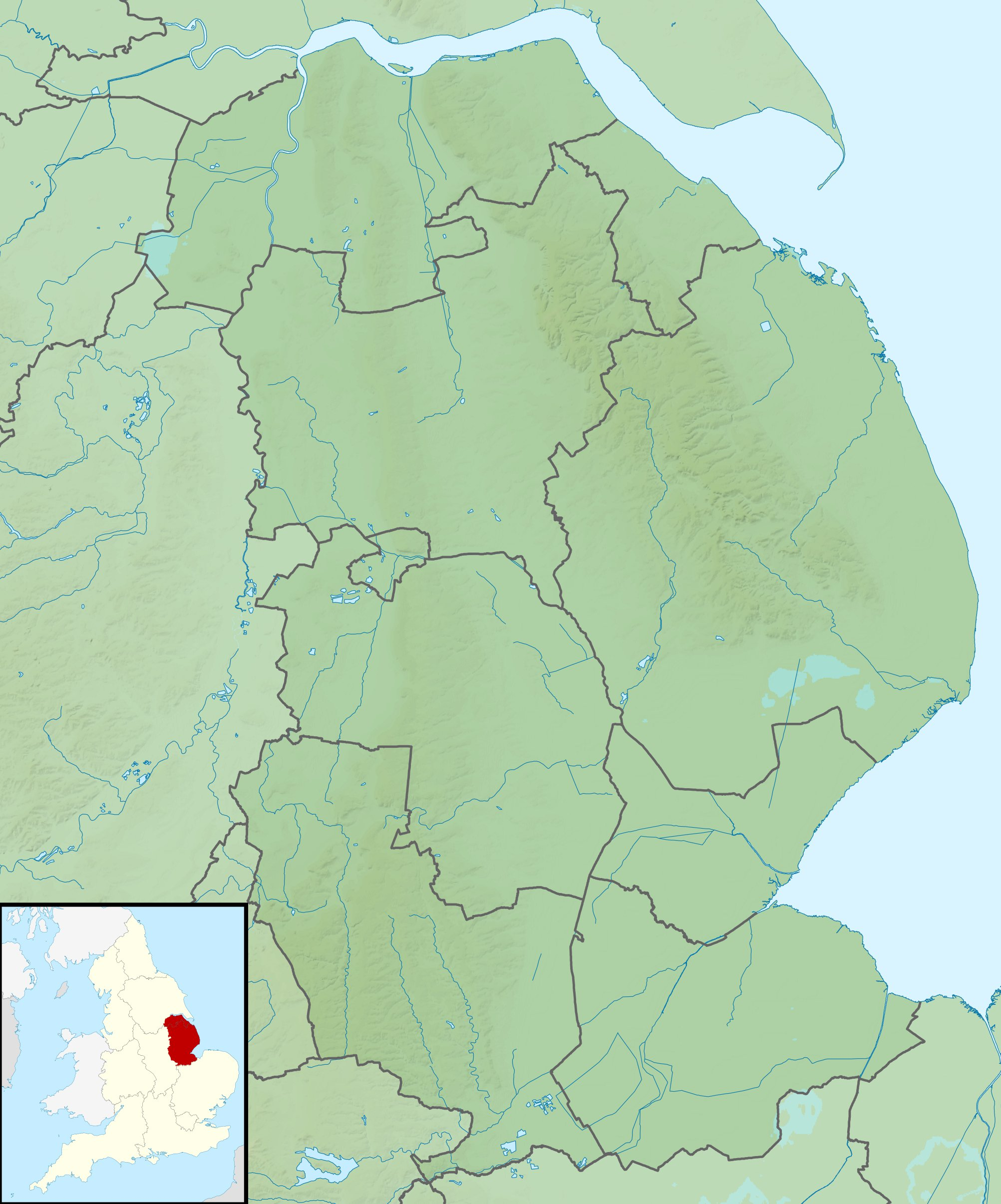
- Location within Lincolnshire
- Former names: Gibraltar Point Lifeboat Station

General information
- Type: RNLI Lifeboat Station
- Location: Tower Esplanade, Skegness, Lincolnshire, PE25 3HH, England
- Coordinates: 53°08′30″N 0°20′48″E
- Opened: RNIPLS 1825; RNLI 1864
- Owner: Royal National Lifeboat Institution

Website
- Skegness RNLI Lifeboat Station

Skegness Lifeboat Station is located at Tower Esplanade, in the town of Skegness, south of the Humber Estuary and north of The Wash, on the east coast of England, in the county of Lincolnshire.

A lifeboat station was first established at Skegness in 1830, by the Lincolnshire Coast Shipwreck Association (LCSA), when they transferred the lifeboat, and closed the Gibraltar Point Lifeboat Station. Management of the station was transferred to the Royal National Lifeboat Institution (RNLI) in 1864.

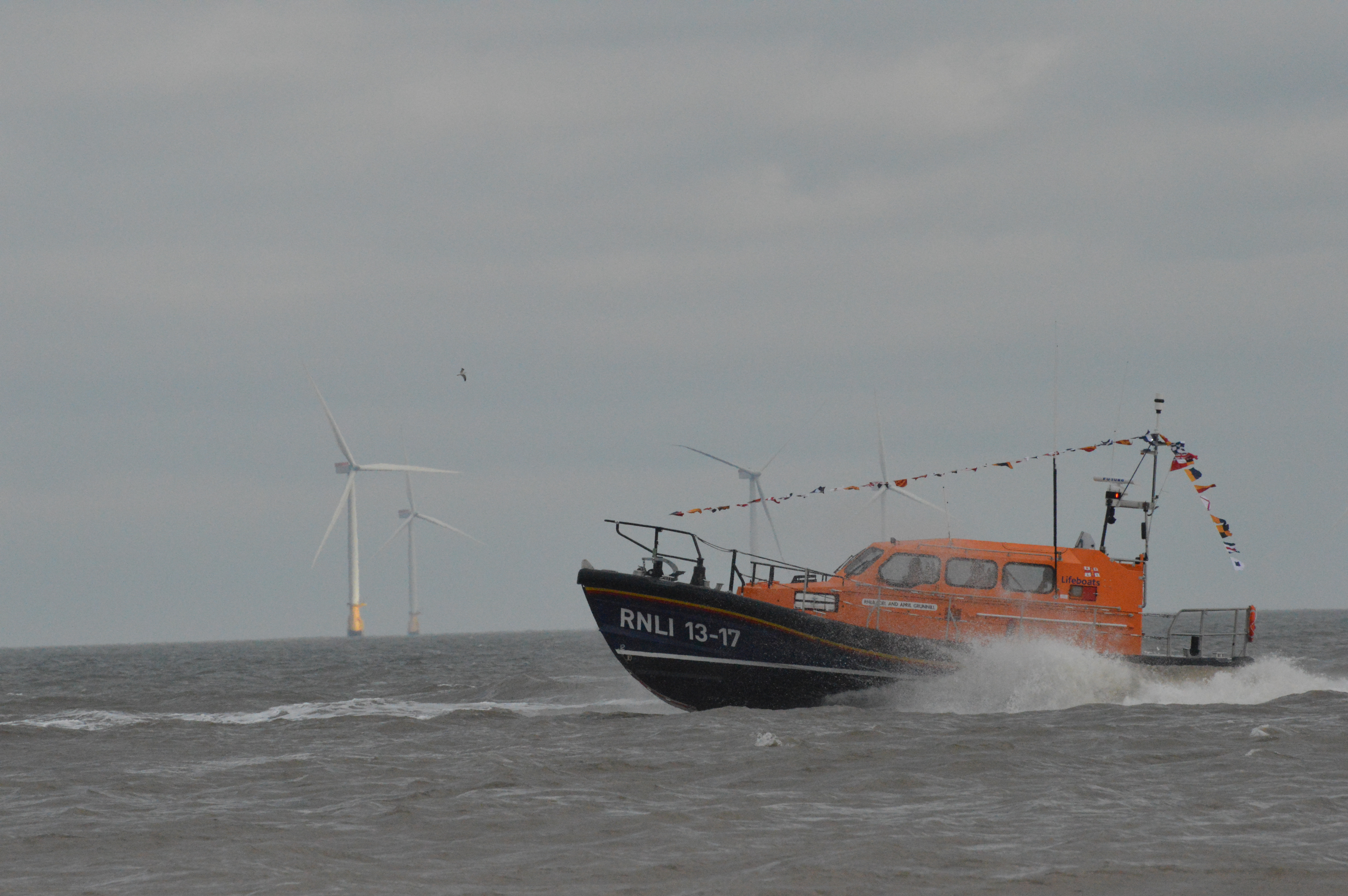
Shannon-class All-weather lifeboat 13-17 Joel and April Grunnill (ON 1324)

The station currently operates an All-weather Shannon-class lifeboat, 13-17 Joel and April Grunnill (ON 1324), on station since 2017, and a D-class (IB1) Inshore lifeboat, The Holland Family (D-842), on station since 2019.

== History ==
In 1825, just one year after its founding by Sir William Hillary Bt., the Royal National Institution for the Preservation of Life from Shipwreck (RNIPLS) decided to establish Gibraltar Point Lifeboat Station, at Gibraltar Point in Lincolnshire. This stretch of the British coastline has many shoals and constantly changing sandbanks, many of which lie between the town and the East Dudgeon Lightship. A boathouse was constructed, and a 24-foot non-self-righting lifeboat was provided, built by William Plenty of Newbury, Berkshire, at a cost of £130.

In 1827, management of the station was passed to the newly created Lincolnshire Coast Shipwreck Association (LCSA), which was founded on 31 July.

On 20 January 1830, the sloop Thomas and Mary of Wells-next-the-Sea ran aground on the Skegness Middle Sand. Some difficulty was encountered launching the Gibraltar Point lifeboat into the rough conditions, not helped by a broken carriage wheel. Two crewmen aboard the Thomas and Mary were lost, but the rest were rescued by the lifeboat.

Following the wreck of the Thomas and Mary in 1830, it was decided to relocate the lifeboat to Skegness. The lifeboat station at Gibraltar Point was closed, and the boathouse was dismantled. A new station was created at Skegness, just 3 mi (5 km) to the north, with the boathouse being reconstructed among the sand dunes, at a location now called Lifeboat Avenue. The cost of removing the boathouse was £28.00

On 18 October 1854, the lifeboat crew launched to assist the stricken brig Atlanta, which had been driven onto the shore in a gale, three miles north of Skegness. The Skegness lifeboat had to be drawn to the beach from her station by six horses. All aboard the Atlanta were rescued. Coxswain Samuel Moody was awarded his second RNLI Silver Medal for the rescue.

By 1863, the lifeboats of the LCSA, Donna Nook, Theddlethorpe, Sutton, and Skegness, were all becoming worn out, and in need of replacement. Larger self-righting lifeboats were now available, but all locations would then need a bigger boathouse, all beyond the finances of the LCSA. At a meeting of Rev. J. Arlington of the LCSA, and Capt. John Ward, RNLI Inspector of Lifeboats, it was agreed that, effective from January 1864, the responsibility and replacement of the four lifeboats and boathouses would be undertaken by the RNLI. The total cost was £2,054-15-9d, with £600 coming from the LCSA. Skegness would receive a 30-foot (8-oared) self-righting 'pulling and sailing' (P&S) lifeboat, one with oars and sails, which would be named Herbert Ingram. A new boathouse was constructed on South Parade, close to the clock tower.

On 5 December 1875, the lifeboat Herbert Ingram launched at 6:00am to the aid of the Colchester barge Star, which had been driven aground in a gale. The lifeboat took twenty minutes to reach the vessel. Two crewmen were taken off, but the Master fell into the water between the two boats. Two lifeboat crewmen went into the rough water with a line and held on to the Master whilst the lifeboat was rowed to shore. For their bravery in this rescue, both lifeboat crewmen were each awarded the RNLI Silver Medal.

In 1882, William Everington retired from his position of Honorary Secretary, which he held since the takeover by the RNLI. He was succeeded by Charles Fred Grantham, aged just 22, who would hold the position for the next 40 years.

Ann, John and Mary (ON 203

A new lifeboat was placed at Skegness in 1888, a 37-foot lifeboat named Ann, John and Mary (ON 203), funded from the legacy of Mrs Ann Ball of London. In 1892, a new boathouse was constructed on the site of the old boathouse at South Parade.This boathouse had access doors for the lifeboat at either end of the building. There was also a watch room constructed on the first floor. This station was in use until 1990 when it was sold to a private buyer.

Matthew Grunnill was appointed Coxswain of Skegness lifeboat in 1908. He had previously served at Chapel Lifeboat Station, first as crew, and then, following the retirement of his father Edward Grunnill, as Coxswain, until the stations closure in 1898.

On 9 November 1912, the Norwegian brig Azha suffered heavy storm damage off the Humber estuary. Waterlogged and helpless, she drifted south for four days. Her crew were close to death when she was spotted, having run aground on the Skegness Middle Sand. The Samuel Lewis (ON 554), the station's last pulling and sailing lifeboat, was launched to assist. Despite the severe weather, the lifeboat managed to get alongside the Azha and take off her crew. The brig was breaking up and was abandoned. The Coxswain and Second Coxswain were awarded silver medals and given written thanks by King Haakon VII of Norway.

Samuel Lewis was replaced in 1932 by the Anne Allen (ON 760). This 35-foot 6in non-self-righting (single engine) Liverpool-class lifeboat was the first motor-powered lifeboat at Skegness. The placement of motor lifeboats at Humber, Wells-next-the-Sea and Skegness, brought about the closure of other east coast lifeboat stations, such as Donna Nook and Hunstanton.

The RNLI placed an D-class (RFD PB16) Inshore lifeboat (ILB) (D-15) at Skegness in May 1964. The ILB was kept in a small house close to the main beach until 1990.

In 1990, it was decided that the cover for this area of the Lincolnshire coast would be greatly improved with the placing of a Mersey-class All-weather lifeboat at Skegness. A new station was constructed on the Tower Esplanade, the first in the British Isles built especially for a Mersey-class lifeboat. The Inshore lifeboat was also housed within the same building, which also has improved crew and equipment facilities, and a souvenir shop to help with branch fundraising.

On 20 May 2016, the Skegness D-class (IB1) Inshore lifeboat, RNLB Peterborough Beer Festival IV (D-739) was taking part in a search for a missing person, when a fire started on board, which spread rapidly. After issuing a mayday, the crew abandoned the vessel, swimming 200 yd (180 m) to shore, while the lifeboat sank. The RNLI started recovery operations, but the damage was severe.

In May 2017, Shannon-class lifeboat 13-17 Joel and April Grunnill (ON 1324) officially replaced the Mersey-class lifeboat Lincolnshire Poacher. The new lifeboat cost £2.2 million. She was launched at the All-weather Lifeboat Centre at Poole on 9 September 2016, delivered to Skegness on 28 January 2017, and officially named on 27 May 2017. Funding came from the legacy of Joel Grunnill, and a donation from his cousin April Grunnill, both of whom had been volunteers with the station.

In 2019, D-class (IB1) lifeboat The Holland Family (D-842) was donated by Robert Holland, in honour of his parents and wider family, who have been long-term volunteers at the station.

== Notable rescues ==
On 27 December 1965, the BP jackup oil rig Sea Gem collapsed, approximately 47 miles north-west off the Norfolk town of Cromer. The Skegness Oakley-class lifeboat Charles Fred Grantham (ON 977), along with lifeboats from Humber, Wells-next-the-Sea and Cromer, was launched the following day to search for the 32 crew. The search lasted 14 hours, in high seas, freezing conditions, and gale-force winds. 19 of the Sea Gem crew were rescued, five confirmed deceased, and eight were never recovered. The RNLI sent the station a letter of appreciation for their part in the search.

== Station honours ==
The following are awards made at Skegness

- RNIPLS Silver Medal
  Thomas Atkins, Commissioned Boatman, H.M. Coastguard – 1850
  Samuel Moody, Coxswain – 1851
- RNLI Silver Medal
  Samuel Moody, Coxswain – 1854 (Second-Service clasp)
  George Chesnutt, crew member – 1876
  Samuel (Skipper Sam) Moody, crew member – 1876
- Silver Medal, awarded by The King of Norway
  Matthew Grunnill, Coxswain – 1912
  Montague Grunnill, Second Coxswain – 1912
- The Thanks of the Institution inscribed on Vellum
  Paul Martin, Coxswain – 1998
- A Framed Letter of Thanks signed by the Chairman of the Institution
  John Irving, Coxswain – 2002
- Silver Medal, awarded by the National Canine Defence League
  W. Perrin, Coxswain – 1954
- Member, Order of the British Empire (MBE)
  Joel Merrien Grunnill, Chairman, Lifeboat Management Group – 2008QBH
  Ray Chapman – 2016NYH
- British Empire Medal
  Doreen April Grunnill – 2016QBH

== Roll of honour ==
In memory of those lost whilst serving Skegness lifeboat.

- Died when he was run over by the lifeboat carriage wheel after exercise, 28 April 1874
  Matthew Hildred (17)

== Lifeboats and tractors ==
=== Gibraltar Point ===
ON (Note: ON is the RNLI's Official Number of the boat.)	Name	Built	On station	Class	Comments
Pre-106	Unnamed	1825	1825−1830	24-foot Plenty Non-self-righting	(Note: 24-foot x 8-foot (8-oared) Plenty-class non-self-righting lifeboat, built by William Plenty of Newbury, Berkshire, costing £135.)

=== Skegness ===
==== Pulling and Sailing lifeboats ====
ON	Name	Built	On station	Class	Comments
Pre-106	Unnamed	1825	1830−1864	24-foot Plenty Non-self-righting	Previously at Gibraltar Point
Pre-412	Herbert Ingram	1864	1864−1874	30-foot Peake Self-Righting (P&S)	(Note: 30-foot x 7-foot 3in (8-oared) self-righting (P&S) lifeboat, gift of the friends of the late Herbert Ingram, MP for Boston (UK Parliament constituency), built by Forrestt of Limehouse, London, costing £219.)
Pre-453	Herbert Ingram	1866	1874−1888	33-foot Self-Righting (P&S)	(Note: 33-foot x 8-foot (10-oared) self-righting (P&S) lifeboat, gift of the friends of the late Herbert Ingram, MP for Boston (UK Parliament constituency), built by Forrestt of Limehouse, London, costing £295 when new.); Previously Leicester at Gorleston and Ipswich at Thorpeness.
203	Ann, John and Mary	1888	1888−1906	37-foot Self-Righting (P&S)	(Note: 37-foot x 8-foot (12-oared) self-righting (P&S) lifeboat, legacy of Miss Ann Ball of London, built by D. and W. Henderson and Company of Partick, costing £594.)
554	Samuel Lewis	1906	1906−1932	35-foot Liverpool (P&S)	(Note: 35-foot x 10-foot (12-oared) Liverpool-class non-self-righting (P&S) lifeboat, gift of Mrs A. Lewis-Hill of London, built by Thames Ironworks of Blackwall, London, costing £956.)

==== Motor lifeboats ====
ON	Op. No. (Note: Op. No. is the RNLI's Operational Number of the boat carried on the hull.)	Name	Built	On station	Class	Comments
760	−	Anne Allen	1932	1932−1953	Liverpool	
833	−	The Cuttle	1940	1953−1964	Liverpool	Previously at Filey
977	37-10	Charles Fred Grantham	1964	1964−1990	37-foot Oakley	
1166	12-008	Lincolnshire Poacher	1990	1990−2017	Mersey	
1324	13-17	Joel and April Grunnill	2017	2017–	Shannon	

Pre ON numbers are unofficial numbers used by the Lifeboat Enthusiasts' Society to reference early lifeboats not included on the official RNLI list.

==== Inshore lifeboats ====
Op. No.	Name	On station	Class	Comments
D-15	Unnamed	1965	D-class (RFD PB16)	
D-58	Unnamed	1965−1972	D-class (RFD PB16)	
D-212	Unnamed	1973−1987	D-class (RFD PB16)	
D-326	Michel Phillipe	1987−1994	D-class (EA16)	
D-460	Leicester Fox	1994−2002	D-class (EA16)	
D-573	Leicester Fox II	2002−2008	D-class (EA16)	
D-538	Tom Broom	2009−2010	D-class (EA16)	
D-739	Peterborough Beer Festival IV	2010−2016	D-class (IB1)	Destroyed by fire, 20 May 2016
D-792	Marie Theresa Bertha	2016–2019	D-class (IB1)	
D-842	The Holland Family	2019–	D-class (IB1)	

==== Launch and Recovery Tractors ====
Op. No.	Reg. No.	Type	On station	Comments
T15	FU 4892	Clayton	1925–1932	
T16	YW 3377	Clayton	1932–1937	
T27	DGP 909	Case L	1937–1955	
T43	JXR 934	Case LA	1955–1964	
T75	AYP 704B	Case 1000D	1964–1966	
T79	DLB 481C	Case 1000D	1966–1974	
T73	500 GYR	Case 1000D	1974–1977	
T74	136 HLC	Case 1000D	1977–1979	
T89	WEL 302S	Talus MBC Case 1150B	1979–1984	
T93	A496 CUX	Talus MB-H Crawler	1984–1995	
T117	L784 JNT	Talus MB-H Crawler	1995–2005	
T114	JI26 WUJ	Talus MB-H Crawler	2005–2017	
SC-T11	HJ16 JVU	SLARS (Supacat)	2016–	Named Fred Henley

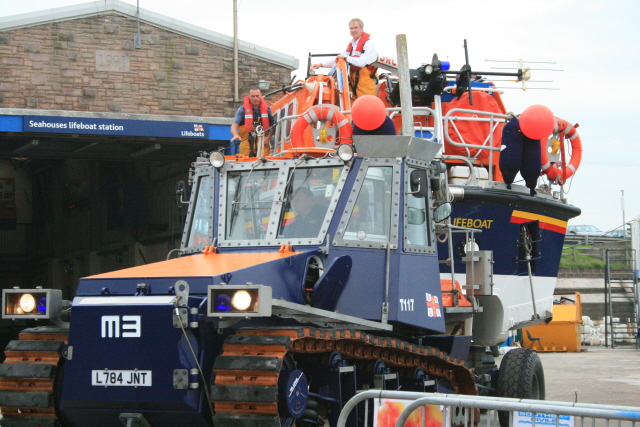
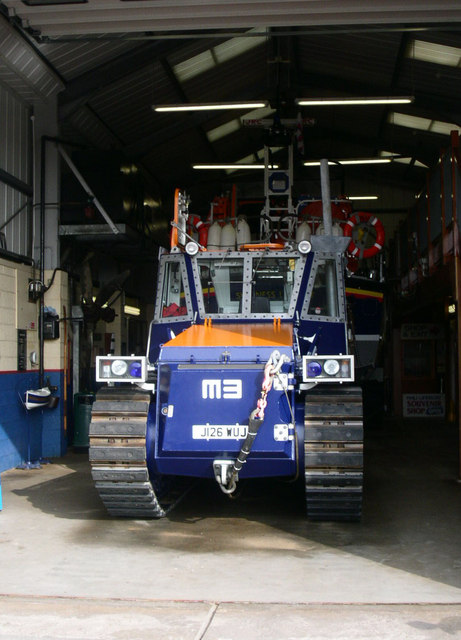
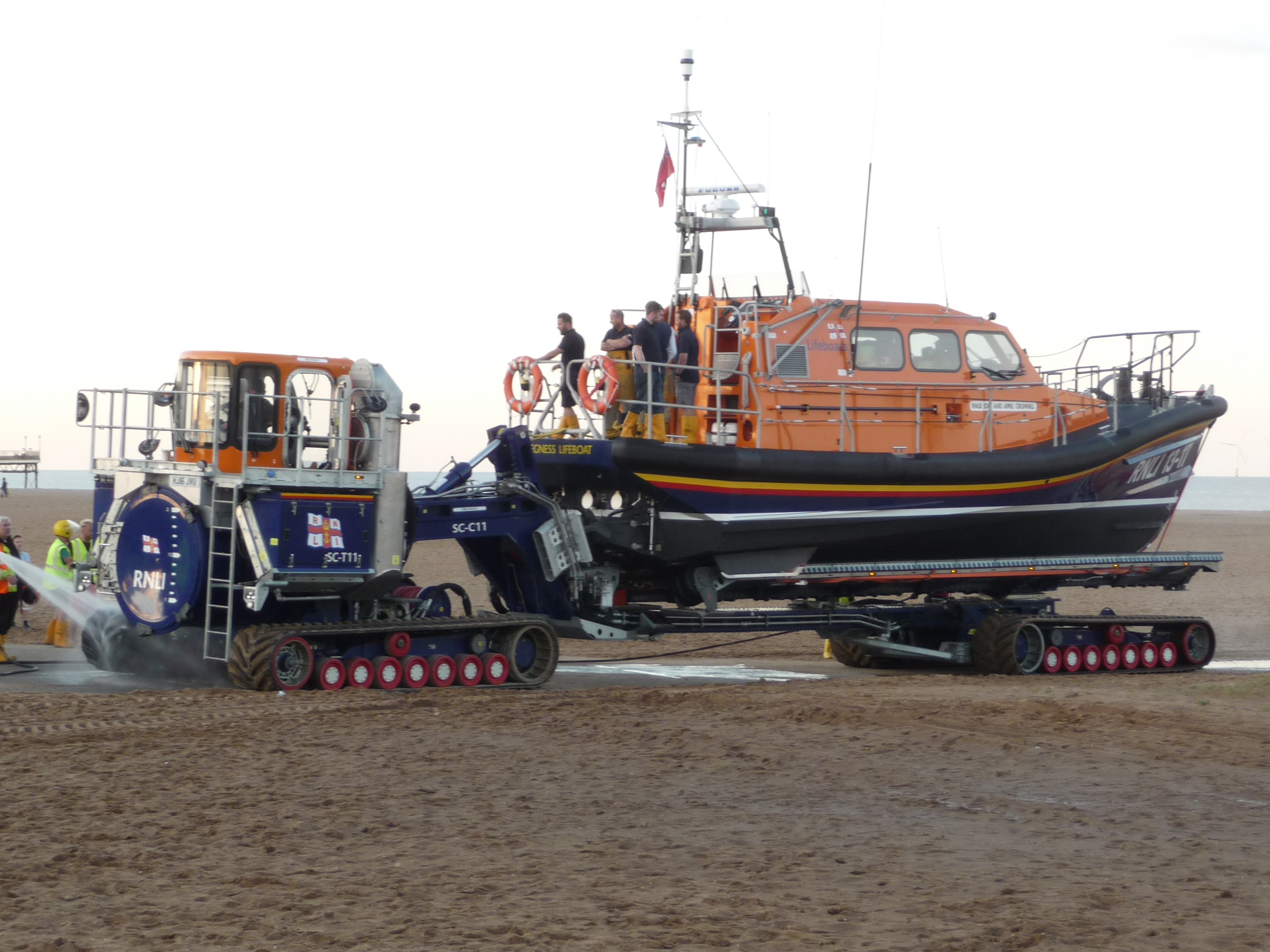
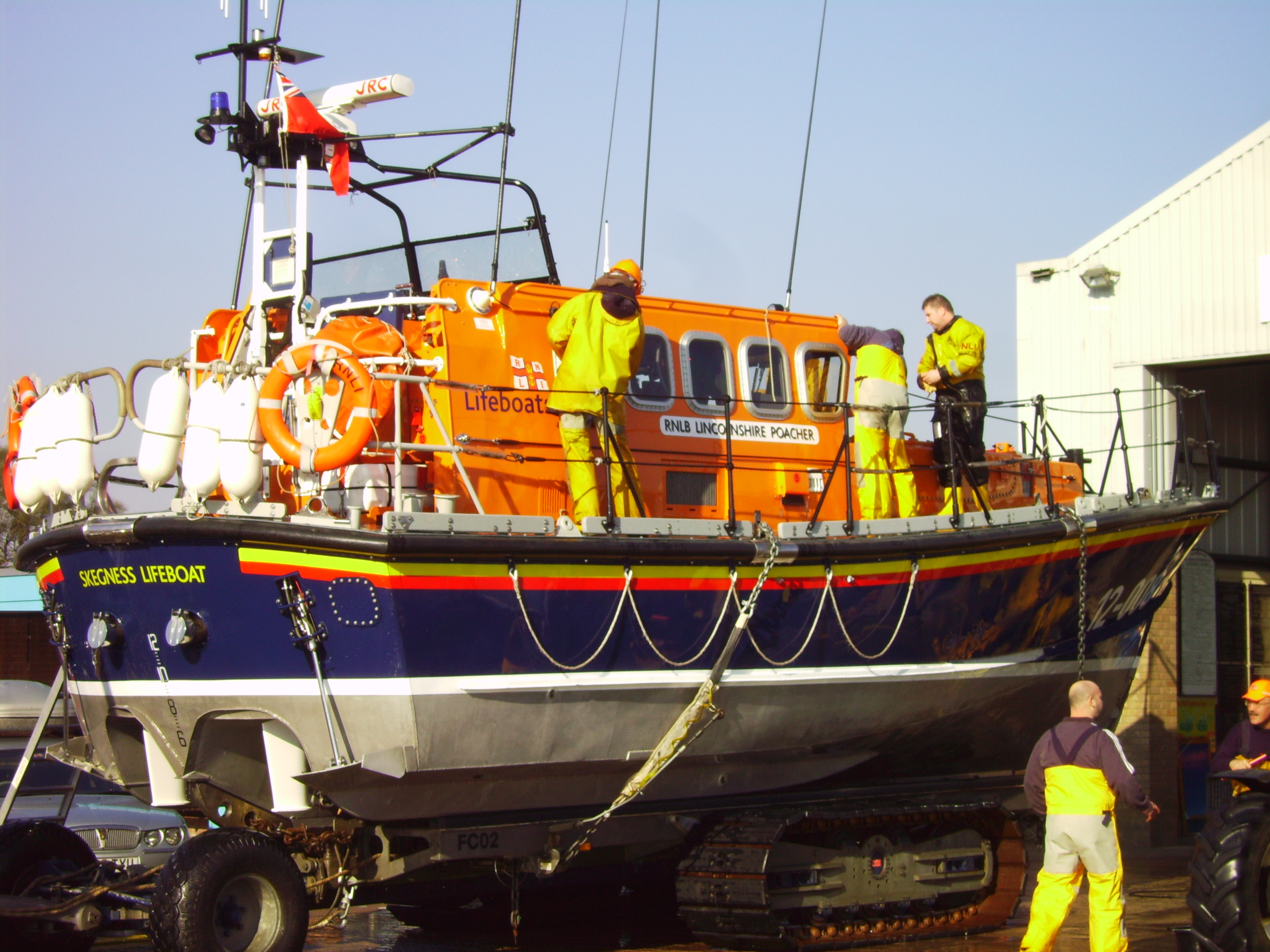

== See also ==
- List of RNLI stations
- List of former RNLI stations
- Royal National Lifeboat Institution lifeboats
