= Chapel Lifeboat Station =

Former RNLI lifeboat station in Lincolnshire, England

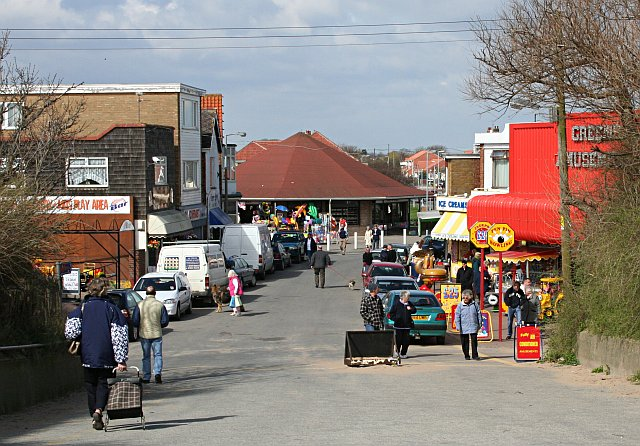
- Chapel St Leonards

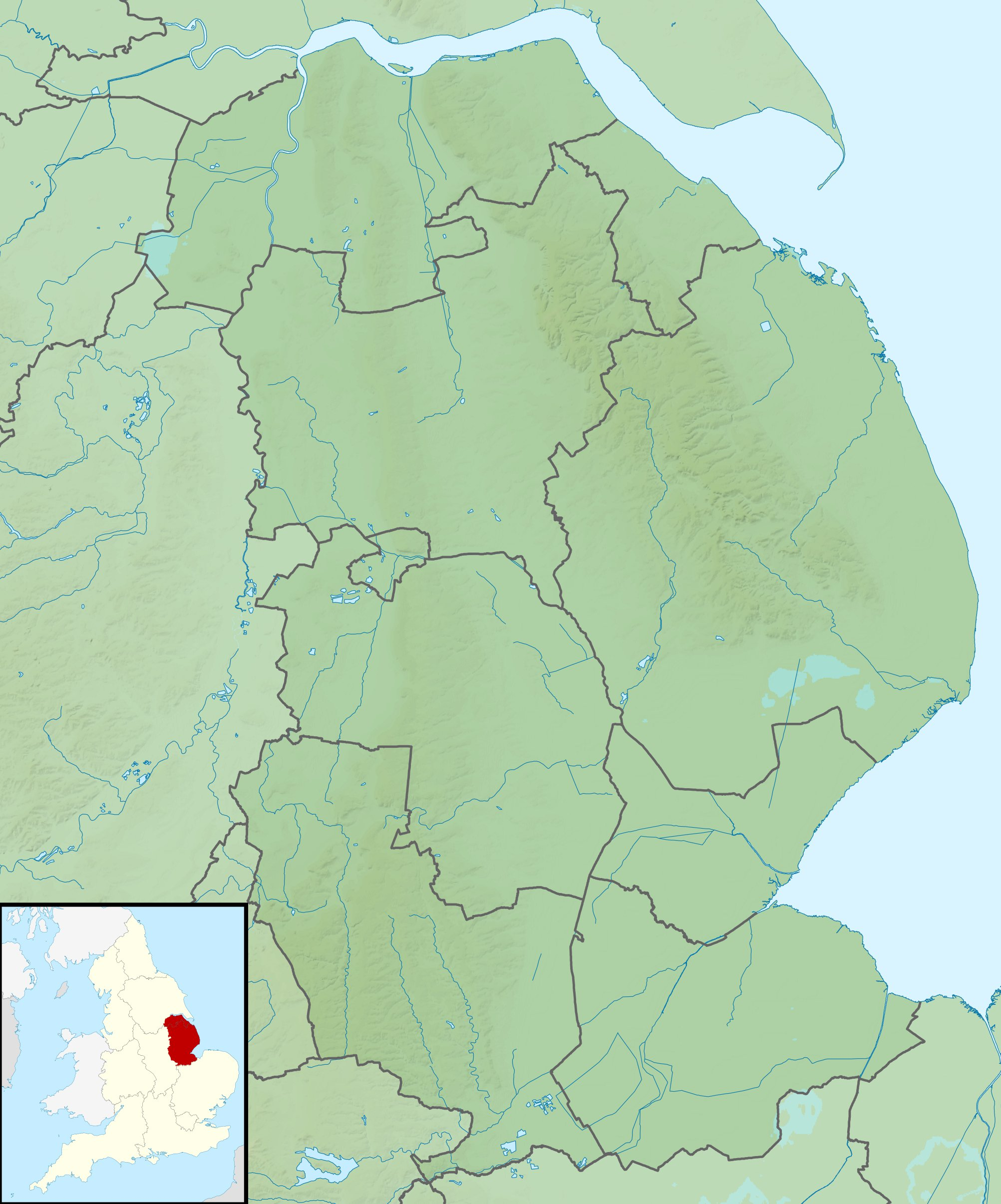
- Location within Lincolnshire

General information
- Status: Closed
- Type: RNLI Lifeboat Station
- Location: Chapel St Leonards, Lincolnshire, England
- Coordinates: 53°13′25.6″N 0°20′17.4″E
- Opened: 1870
- Closed: 1898

Chapel Lifeboat Station was located at the village of Chapel St Leonards, sitting approximately 6 miles (9.7 km) north of Skegness, on the coast of Lincolnshire.

A lifeboat was first stationed at Chapel St Leonards in 1870, by the Royal National Lifeboat Institution (RNLI).

After only 14 launches in 28 years, the station was closed in 1898.

== History ==
In April 1870, the RNLI decided to create a new lifeboat station at Chapel St Leonards. A new boathouse was constructed at The Pullover, at a cost of £158, and a carriage was provided, costing £93-12s-0d. An order had been placed with Forrestt of Limehouse, London for a 30-foot self-righting lifeboat, which cost £235-10s-0d, funded by Lady Jane Barbara Bourchier (1810–1884) of Hampton Court Palace, and was named Godsend at a ceremony on 22 July 1870, attended by over 10,000 people. Edward Grunnill was appointed Coxswain.

Godsend was replaced in 1876 with another 30-foot self-righting lifeboat, built by Woolfe of Shadwell, costing £275. Funded by Miss Jennie Landseer, the lifeboat was named Landseer, in memory of her late brother and acclaimed artist Sir Edwin Landseer, RA (1802–1873).

Twelve years later, a third and final boat was provided to Chapel. A 31-foot self-righting boat, constructed by Hansen, and costing £288. She was funded, along with a second boat for Sutton Lifeboat Station, from the legacy of Miss Caroline Berrey, and was named John Alexander Berrey (On 217) at a ceremony on 25 May 1888.

In October 1888, Matthew Grunnill was appointed Coxswain, following the retirement of his father Edward Grunnill. Matthew would later serve as a crew member, and later coxswain, of Skegness lifeboat.

On 8 April 1891, John Alexander Berrey (ON 217) was launched at 07:45 to the aid of the schooner Vibelia, on passage from Grimstad to Boston, Lincolnshire. The vessel was found to be a total wreck, but the lifeboat managed to rescue all seven crew.

14 people owed their lives to the Chapel lifeboat. However, with very few services recorded, Chapel lifeboat having launched only 14 times in 28 years, it was decided to close the station in 1898. John Alexander Berrey (ON 217) became a reserve lifeboat, and was used for demonstrations. The Chapel boathouse still remains, and is currently a shop.

== Chapel lifeboats ==
ON (Note: ON is the RNLI's Official Number of the boat.)	Name	Built	On station	Class	Comments
Pre-541	Godsend	1870	1870−1876	30-foot Peake Self-righting (P&S)	(Note: 30-foot x 7-foot 7in (8-oared) Peake-class self-righting (P&S) lifeboat, gift of Lady Bouchier of Hampton Court Palace, built by Forrestt of Limehouse, London, costing £236.)
Pre-614	Landseer	1876	1876−1888	30-foot Self-righting (P&S)	(Note: 30-foot x 8-foot (8-oared) self-righting (P&S) lifeboat, gift of Miss Jennie Landseer of Kensington, built by Woolfe of Shadwell, London, costing £275.)
217	John Alexander Berrey	1888	1888−1898	31-foot Self-righting (P&S)	(Note: 31-foot x 7-foot 3in (10-oared) self-righting (P&S) lifeboat, legacy of Miss C. Berrey of Hampstead. built by Hansen of east Cowes, costing £280.)

Pre ON numbers are unofficial numbers used by the Lifeboat Enthusiast Society to reference early lifeboats not included on the official RNLI list.

== See also ==
- List of RNLI stations
- List of former RNLI stations
- Royal National Lifeboat Institution lifeboats
