= Huttoft =

Village in East Lindsey district of Lincolnshire, England

Coordinates: 53.263434°N 0.267533°E

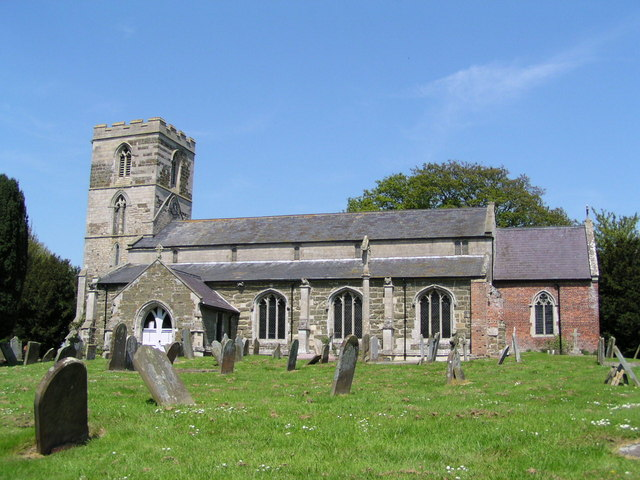
- St Margaret's Church, Huttoft

- Location within Lincolnshire
- Population: 585 (2011)
- OS grid reference: TF513764
  - London: 120 mi (190 km) S
- District: East Lindsey
- Shire county: Lincolnshire
- Region: East Midlands
- Country: England
- Sovereign state: United Kingdom
- Post town: Alford
- Postcode district: LN13
- Police: Lincolnshire
- Fire: Lincolnshire
- Ambulance: East Midlands
- UK Parliament: Louth and Horncastle

Huttoft is a village in the East Lindsey district of Lincolnshire, England, about 4 miles (6 km) east of the market town of Alford, on the A52 road between Ingoldmells and Sutton-on-Sea. John Betjeman, later England's Poet Laureate, visited Huttoft in the 1940s and devoted a poem to its parish church.

== History ==
=== Etymology and early history ===
Huttoft is listed three times in the 1086 Domesday Book as Hotoft, in the manors of both Huttoft and Greetham in the Calcewath Hundred of the South Riding of Lindsey. The combined listings record more than 19 households and 20 villagers, 23 smallholders, 69 freemen, 20 ploughlands, and meadows of 860 acres (3.5 km^{2}). Before the Norman Conquest Earl Harold was lord of Greetham; in 1086 it was transferred to Earl Hugh of Chester, who also became tenant-in-chief to King William I. The 1086 tenant-in-chief of Huttoft was Alfred of Lincoln.

Huttoft is an Anglo-Norse place-name derived from Old English hoh ‘decline’, ‘slope’ and Old Norse topt ‘site of a house’. The Dictionary of British Place Names defines Huttoft as a ‘homestead on a spur of land". De Beaurepaire states that it is the same name as the Hottot; Hotot (e.g. Hotot-en-Auge); Hautot (former Hotot, e.g. Hautot-sur-Seine) in Normandy.

=== World War II ===
On January 10 1943, three people were killed by four HE bombs, with a direct hit on a Sea Lane house, which killed a man, and Huttoft Grange was damaged, killing a woman.

== Landmarks ==
St Margaret's Church is in the decorated style, and is a Grade I listed building of greenstone and limestone with some brick patching. Restorations took place in 1869, 1882 and 1910. The west tower is 13th century, although it was extended in the 14th century. The font is 15th century and the cover is 19th century. The churchyard cross is Grade II listed, restored in 1896 with the addition of a crucifix.

The Poet Laureate John Betjeman (1906–1984) was fond of Lincolnshire: wolds, marsh and the Georgian town of Louth. He refers to St Margaret's, Huttoft, in the second of his Lincolnshire poems, A Lincolnshire Church. This is one of his longer poems and also mentions the vicar of 1943–1959, Theophilus Caleb, whom he met.

The Wesleyan Methodist chapel in Sutton Road joined the Alford, Skegness and Wainfleet Methodist Circuit in 1997.

The Primitive Methodists also had a chapel, in Church Lane, which was on the Alford Methodist circuit until 1963 and has since been demolished, but its graveyard remains.

Huttoft windmill, in the centre of the village, is Grade II listed. It lost its sails in 1945 in a storm after a century of milling.

Huttoft School was built as a National School in 1840 and enlarged in 1874. It was known as Huttoft CE School by 1914 and became Huttoft County Primary in 1947. It became a grant-maintained school and has been known as Huttoft Primary (GM) School since 1999.

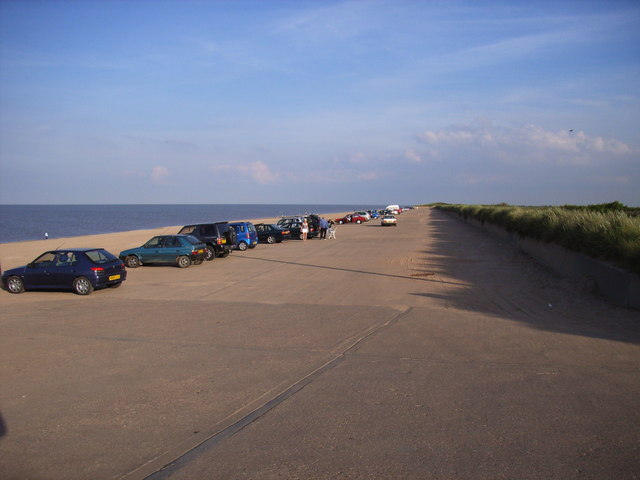
Huttoft Car Terrace

Huttoft Bank Pit, some 2.5 miles (4.0 km) east of the village, is a nature reserve protected by the Lincolnshire Wildlife Trust. It provided clay for repairs to the sea bank after the North Sea flood of 1953. It includes a large area of open water and extensive reed beds. Huttoft Bank leads to Huttoft Beach, also known as Moggs Eye. The coastal path links to Anderby and Chapel Point in the south and Sandilands to the north.

Huttoft is the location of the Radcliffe Donkey Sanctuary.

== Gallery ==
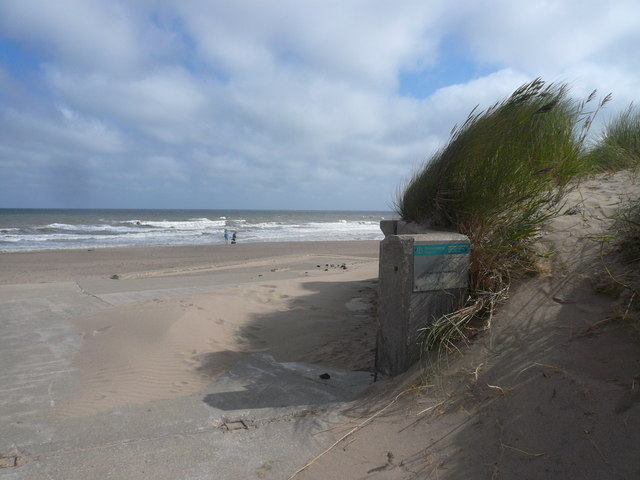
Moggs Eye

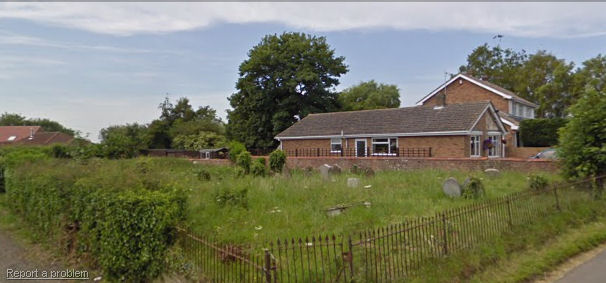
Primitive Methodist cemetery

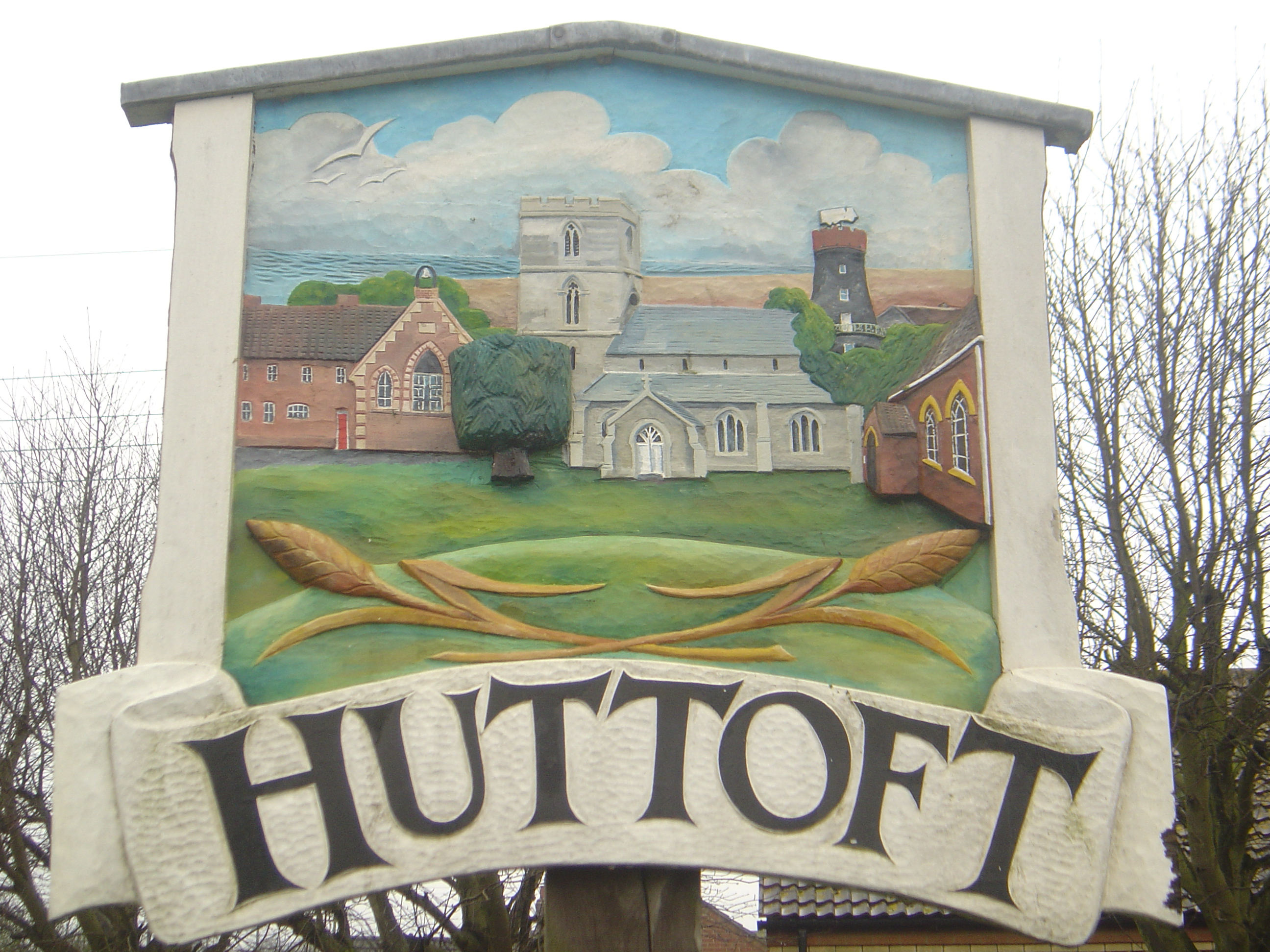
Huttoft sign

== Population ==
Population of Huttoft Civil Parish
Year	1801	1811	1821	1831	1841	1851	1881	1891	1901	1911	1921	1931	1951	1961	2001	2011
Population	286	340	401	470	515	586	597	535	469	468	458	461	448	404	546	585
