= Sutton Lifeboat Station =

Former RNLI lifeboat station in Lincolnshire, England

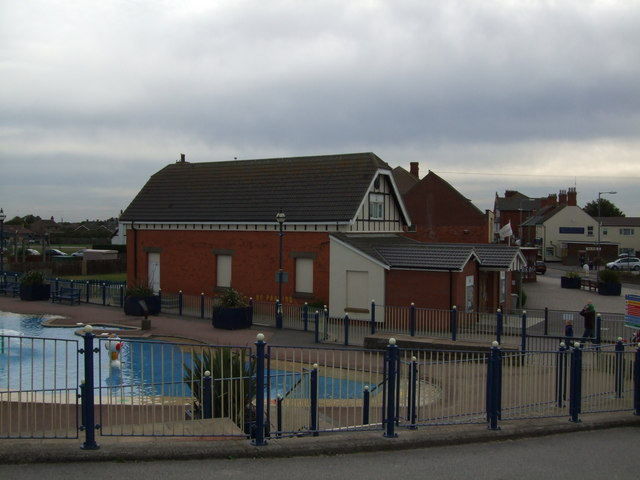
- Former Sutton Lifeboat Station.

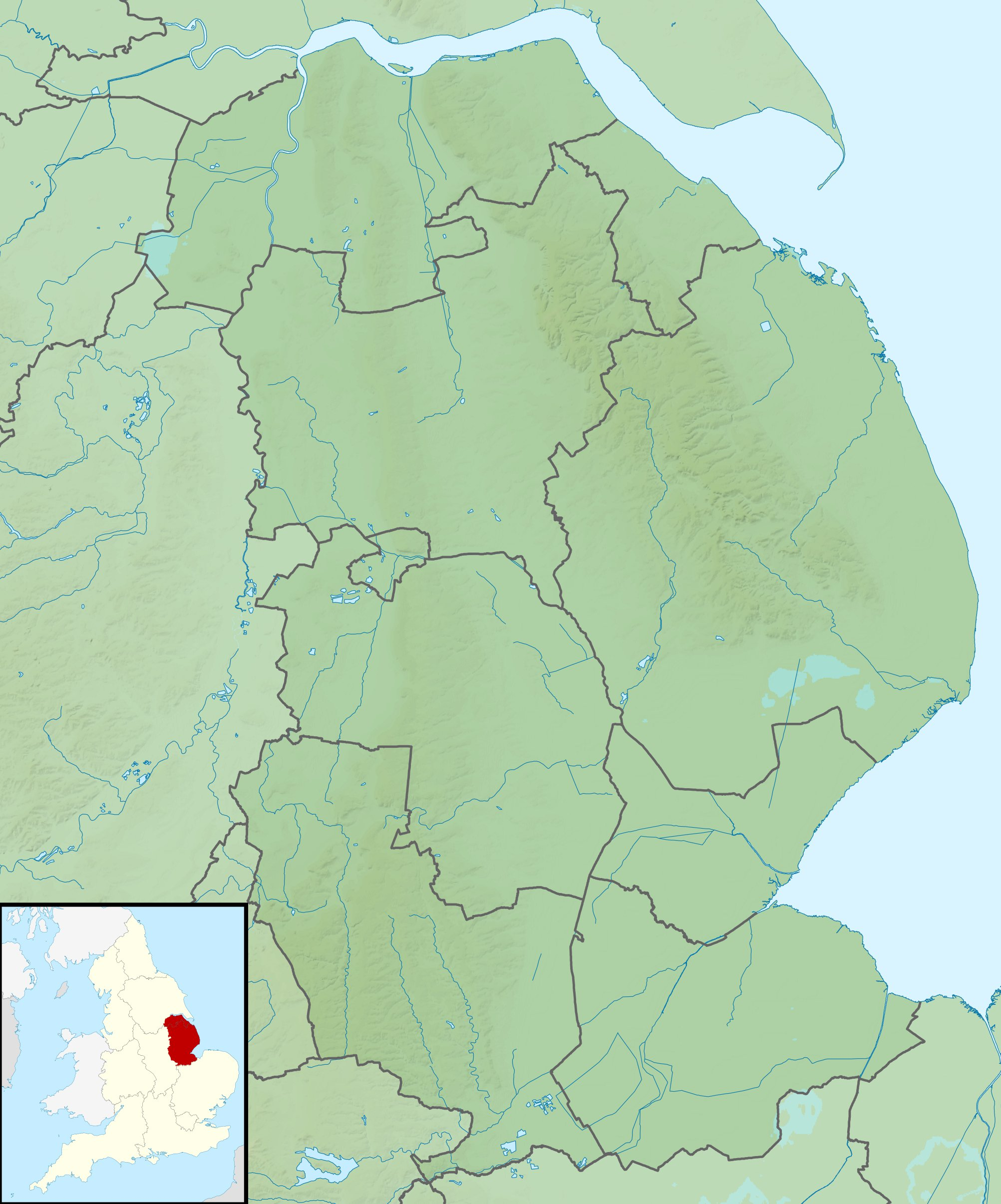
- Location within Lincolnshire

General information
- Type: RNLI Lifeboat Station
- Location: Sutton on Sea, Lincolnshire, England
- Coordinates: 53°18′51.1″N 0°16′58.8″E
- Opened: 1835 Huttoft (LCSA); 1844 Sutton (LCSA); 1864 Sutton (RNLI)
- Closed: 1913

Sutton Lifeboat Station was located at Sutton-on-Sea, a village approximately 13 miles (21 km) north of Skegness, on the east coast of Lincolnshire.

A lifeboat was first stationed at Sutton-on-Sea by the Lincolnshire Coast Shipwreck Association (LCSA) in 1844, although it was preceded by a station at Huttoft from 1835. Management of the station was transferred to the Royal National Lifeboat Institution (RNLI) in 1864.

With only a small number of launches and few lives saved over the last 25 years, Sutton Lifeboat Station was closed in 1913.

== History ==
In July 1835, the Lincolnshire Coast Shipwreck Association (LCSA) decided to place a lifeboat at Huttoft. A 24-foot boat had been ordered from Bell & Grange, of Grimsby, costing £109-12s-6d. The boat was named Birmingham, as some funds were raised in the city. John Shaw was appointed Coxswain.

The boat was only launched once, in 1843, to the aid of the schooner Rocket, on passage from Sunderland to King's Lynn, driven ashore at Huttoft, Three lives were saved.

Finding crew for the boat was proving difficult at the remote location, and so in 1844, the boat was moved to a new station at Sutton-on-Sea. She would go on to launch seven more times over the next twenty years, rescuing 28.

LCSA transferred their lifeboats and stations to the RNLI in 1864. A new boat was ordered from Forrestt of Limehouse, London, a 30-foot Self-righting 'pulling and sailing' (P&S) lifeboat, one using oars and sail, which cost £190, and a new boathouse was constructed, costing a further £205. With all costs again met by funds raised in Birmingham, she was taken there for a naming ceremony on 29 November 1864, and named Birmingham No.1. She would launch nine times, and save 13 lives.

On 3 December 1867, Birmingham No.1 was launched to the aid of the brig Clarinda, on passage from Ostend, Belgium to Sunderland, de-masted and driven ashore at Ingoldmells. Seven men were rescued from the vessel, which was later driven out to sea, and never seen again.

Birmingham No.1 was replaced in 1876 by the Caroline, a lifeboat that would serve Sutton on Sea for a further 12 years, and rescue 10 people.

On 16 December 1876, the Sutton lifeboat Caroline was launched to the aid of the barque Beecher Stowe. on passage from Denmark to London, when she was driven ashore. All 10 crew were rescued.

Two matching 31-foot self-righting lifeboats were funded at the bequest of Miss Caroline Berrey, constructed by Hansen in 1888. One was provided to Chapel Lifeboat Station, named John Alexander Berrey (ON 217), with the second boat sent to Sutton, and named Elizabeth Berrey (ON 218).

In 1897, the last boat to serve at Sutton was the Sir John (ON 408). A 35-foot self-righting lifeboat constructed by Thames Ironworks. Sir John would be launched 5 times in 16 years, but with no lives saved.

With a record of eight 8 launches and five lives saved over the previous 25 years, Sutton Lifeboat Station was closed in 1913. Sir John (ON 408) was transferred to Cemlyn and served a further five years, before joining the relief fleet. The station building in Sutton-on-Sea still stands, and is currently the Meridale Centre.

== Sutton lifeboats ==
ON (Note: ON is the RNLI's Official Number of the boat.)	Name	Built	On station	Class	Comments
−	Birmingham	1835	1835−1864	24-foot Non-self-righting	(Note: 24-foot x 7-foot (6/8-oared) non-self-righting lifeboat, provided by funds raised in Birmingham, built by Bell & Grange of Grimsby, costing £111.); At Huttoft 1835–1844.
Pre-414	Birmingham No.1	1864	1864−1876	30-foot Peake Self-righting (P&S)	(Note: 30-foot x 7-foot 3in (8-oared) Peake-class self-righting (P&S) lifeboat, gift of the Birmingham Workpeople's fund, built by Forrestt of Limehouse, London, costing £190.)
Pre-613	Caroline	1876	1876−1888	30-foot Montrose Self-righting (P&S)	(Note: 30-foot x 8-foot (8-oared) Montrose-class self-righting (P&S) lifeboat, gift of Mr N. Reid of Mincing Lane, built by Wolfe of Shadwell, London, costing £275.)
218	Elizabeth Berrey	1888	1888−1897	31-foot Self-righting (P&S)	(Note: 31-foot x 7-foot 3in (10-oared) self-righting (P&S) lifeboat, legacy of Miss C. Berrey of Hampstead, built by Hansen of East Cowes, costing £280.)
408	Sir John	1897	1897−1913	35-foot Self-righting (P&S)	(Note: 35-foot x 8-foot 3in (10-oared) self-righting (P&S) lifeboat, gift of Mr H. Blackwood of Leamington, built by Thames Ironworks, of Blackwall, London, costing £645.)

Pre ON numbers are unofficial numbers used by the Lifeboat Enthusiast Society to reference early lifeboats not included on the official RNLI list.

== See also ==
- List of RNLI stations
- List of former RNLI stations
- Royal National Lifeboat Institution lifeboats
