= Theddlethorpe Lifeboat Station =

Former lifeboat station in Lincolnshire, England

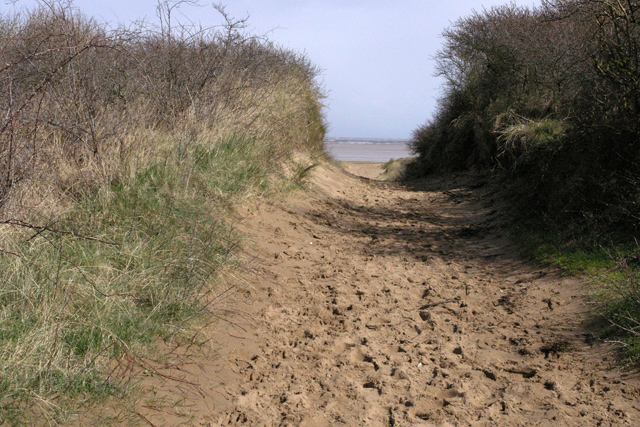
- Theddlethorpe Sand Dunes.

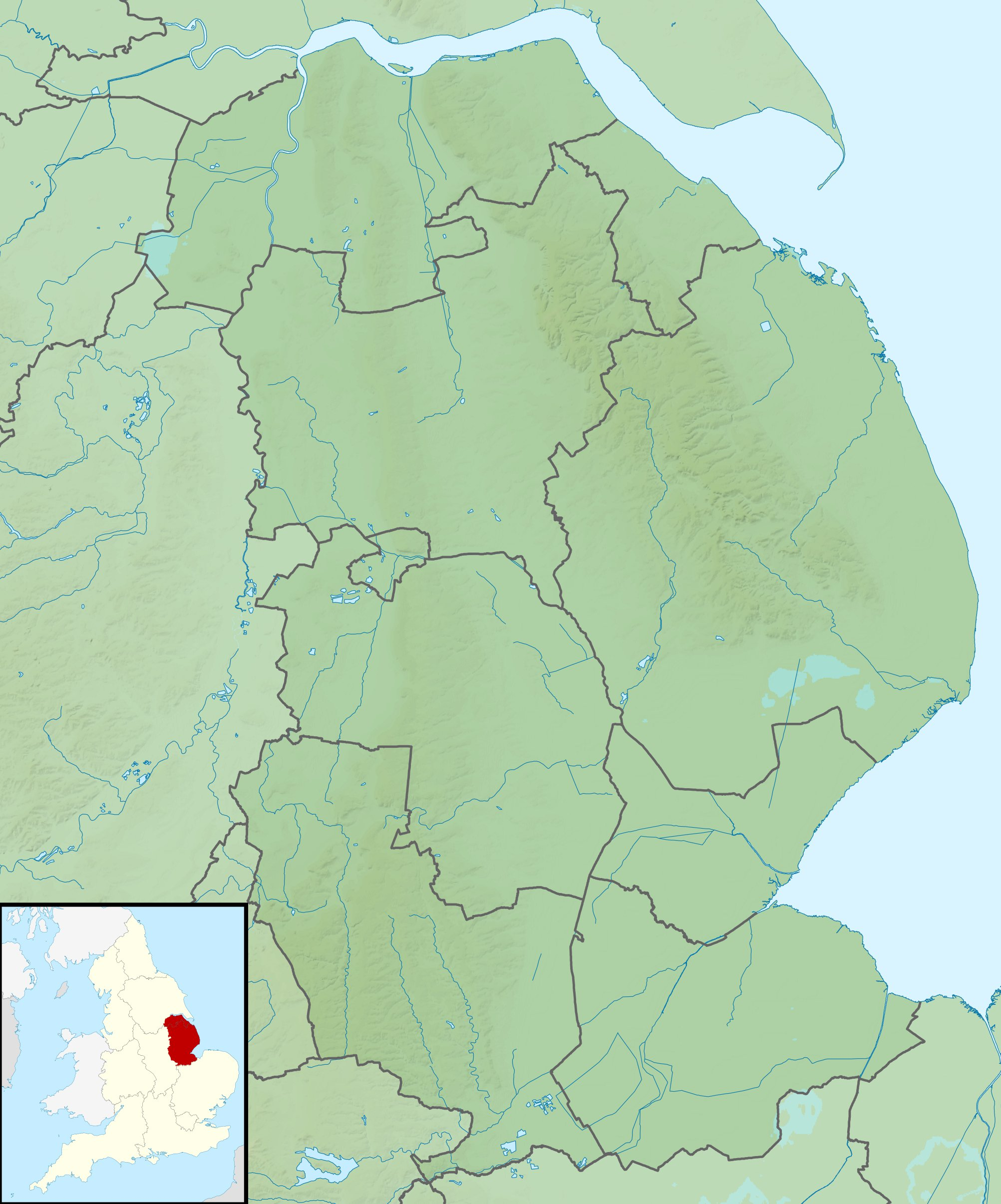
- Location within Lincolnshire

General information
- Status: Closed
- Type: RNLI Lifeboat Station
- Location: Theddlethorpe St Helen, Lincolnshire, England
- Coordinates: 53°23′15.0″N 0°13′22.0″E
- Opened: 1828 LCSA; 1864 RNLI
- Closed: 1882

Theddlethorpe Lifeboat Station was located near the village of Theddlethorpe St Helen, on the east coast of the county of Lincolnshire.

A lifeboat was first stationed at Theddlethorpe by the Lincolnshire Coast Shipwreck Association (LCSA) in 1828. Management of the station was transferred to the Royal National Lifeboat Institution (RNLI) in 1864.

With problems finding enough local crew, and further difficulties launching the boat at that location, the RNLI closed the station in 1882, and opened a new station at Mablethorpe, just down the coast, in 1883.

== History ==
Theddlethorpe Lifeboat Station opened when the Lincolnshire Coast Shipwreck Association placed a lifeboat there in 1828. She was a 22-foot lifeboat built by William Plenty, costing £143. A boathouse was constructed at a further cost of just over £64, and John Bell was appointed Coxswain. This first Theddlethorpe lifeboat, which was unnamed, was launched on service 10 times over a 35 year period, and is credited with the rescue of 27 lives. Between 1830–1832, the Theddlethorpe boat was temporarily placed at Donna Nook Lifeboat Station, as their old boat was deemed unfit, and a new boat was being built.

In 1864, the LCSA handed over control of their six lifeboat stations, including Theddlethorpe, to the RNLI. The RNLI immediately placed an order for a new lifeboat with Forrestt of Limehouse, London, a 30-foot self-righting 'Pulling and Sailing' (P&S) lifeboat), one with sails and (8) oars, which cost £216-1s-0d. A carriage was provided at £83, and a new boathouse was constructed, costing £160. The total cost was met by a gift from a Mrs. Carslake and 'friend'. The lifeboat arrived in Theddlethorpe on 20 October 1864, and at a ceremony was named Dorinda and Barbara. Dorinda and Barbara would be launched just four times over the next seven years, but is credited with rescuing 41 lives.

The third, and last, lifeboat to serve at Theddlethorpe, was again funded by Mrs Carslake and 'friend', and again named Dorinda and Barbara (ON 29). A 30-foot Norfolk and Suffolk-class non-self-righting lifeboat, costing £145, and built by James Beeching of Great Yarmouth, arrived on service on 17 October 1871. She would launch 11 times, and rescue 19.

Theddlethorpe Lifeboat Station was closed in 1882. A new station was opened at Mablethorpe in 1883. The lifeboat Dorinda and Barbara (ON 29) was relocated to Southwold No.2 station, renamed Quiver No.2. No evidence remains of the former lifeboat station.

== Theddlethorpe lifeboats ==
ON (Note: ON is the RNLI's Official Number of the boat.)	Name	Built	On station	Class	Comments
−	Unnamed	1829	1829−1830	22-foot Plenty non-self-righting	(Note: 22-foot x 7-foot (6-oared) Plenty-class non-self-righting lifeboat, funded by the LCSA, built by William Plenty of Newbury, Berkshire, costing £143 when new.); Operated from Donna Nook between 1830 and 1832.
Station Closed 1830–1832
−	Unnamed	1829	1832–1864	22-foot Plenty non-self-righting	
Pre-413	Dorinda and Barbara	1864	1864−1871	30-foot Peake Self-righting (P&S)	(Note: 30-foot x 7-foot 3in (8-oared) Peake-class self-righting (P&S) lifeboat, gift of Mrs B. Carslake of Brixton, built by Forrestt of Limehouse, London, costing £216.)
29	Dorinda and Barbara	1871	1871−1882	30-foot Norfolk & Suffolk 'Surf-boat'	(Note: 30-foot x 9-foot (12-oared) Norfolk and Suffolk-class non-self-righting 'Surf-Boat', gift of Mrs B. Carslake of Brixton, built by James Beeching of Great Yarmouth, costing £145.)

Pre ON numbers are unofficial numbers used by the Lifeboat Enthusiast Society to reference early lifeboats not included on the official RNLI list.

== See also ==
- List of RNLI stations
- List of former RNLI stations
- Royal National Lifeboat Institution lifeboats
