= Donna Nook Lifeboat Station =

Former RNLI lifeboat station in Lincolnshire, England

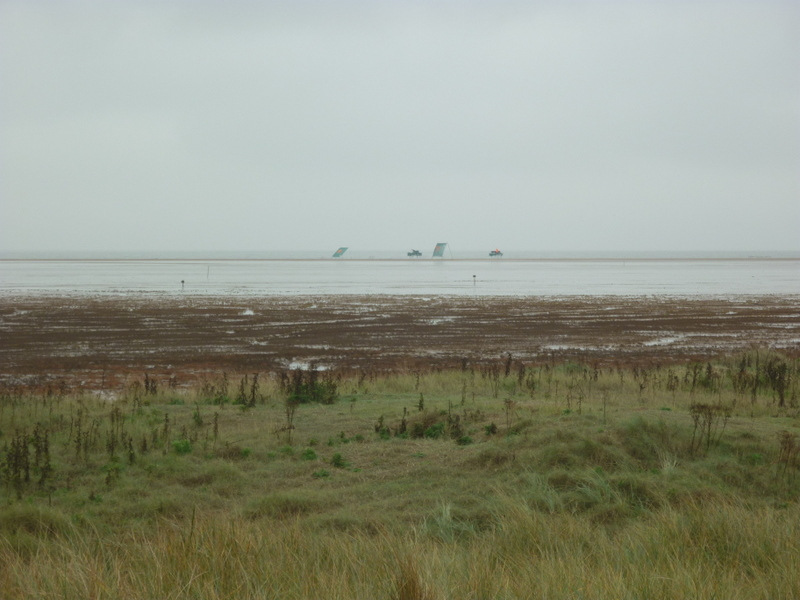
- Donna Nook Sands

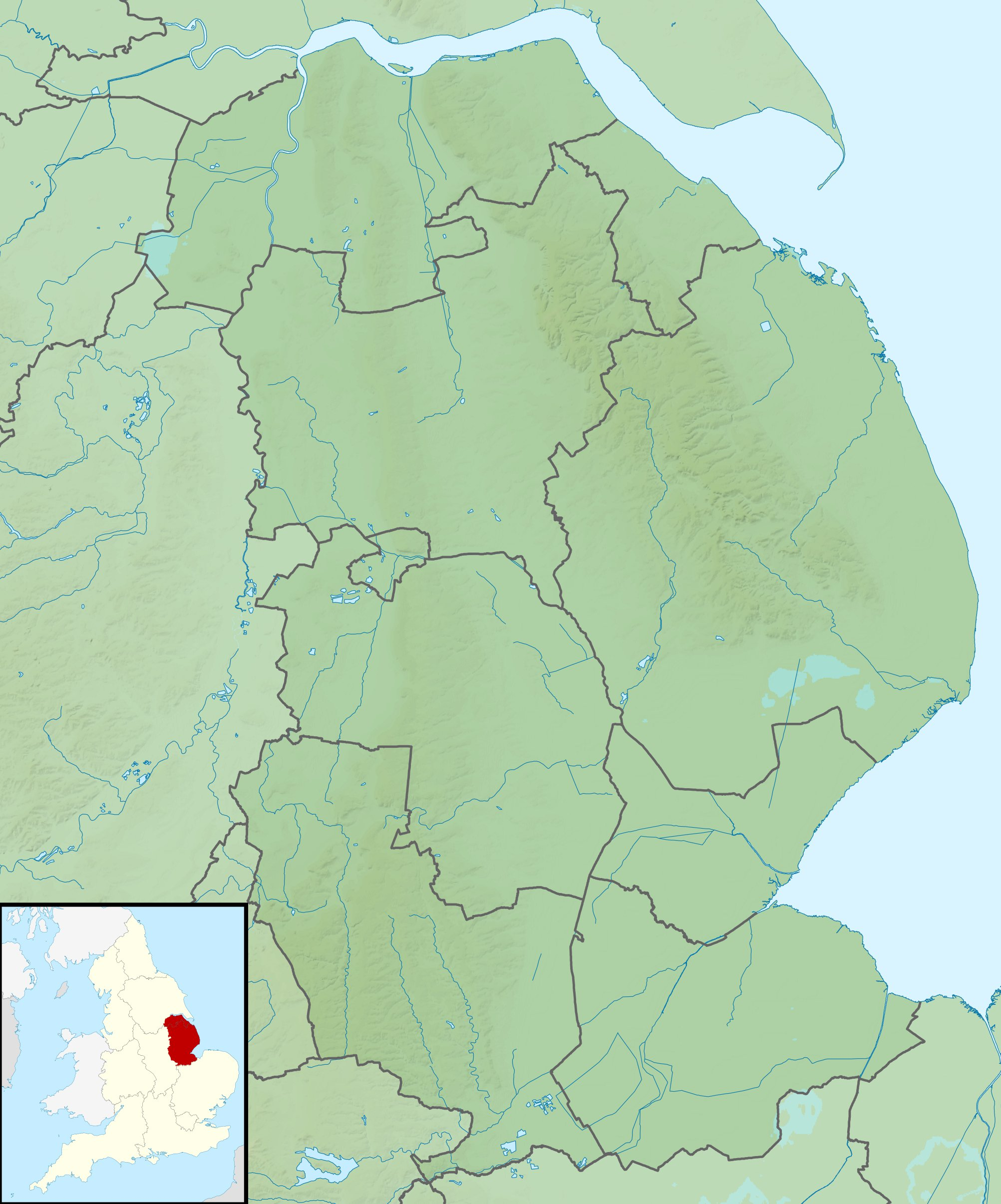
- Location within Lincolnshire

General information
- Status: Closed
- Type: RNLI Lifeboat Station
- Location: Donna Nook, Lincolnshire, England
- Coordinates: 53°28′28.6″N 0°09′09.4″E
- Opened: 1829 LCSA; 1864 RNLI
- Closed: 1931

Donna Nook Lifeboat Station was located to the north of the village of North Somercotes, in the East Lindsey district of the county of Lincolnshire.

A lifeboat was first stationed at Donna Nook by the Lincolnshire Coast Shipwreck Association (LCSA) in 1829, and subsequently transferred to the management of the Royal National Lifeboat Institution (RNLI) in 1864.

After operating for 102 years, Donna Nook Lifeboat Station was closed in 1931.

== History ==
A lifeboat station was opened at Donna Nook by the LCSA in 1829. A lifeboat, originally built in 1805 for Bridlington Lifeboat Station by Henry Greathead, and later used briefly by the LCSA at Saltfleet, was transferred to the station at Donna Nook. However, it was soon realised that the boat was not suitable for the location. The Theddlethorpe lifeboat was then loaned to Donna Nook in 1830, until a new boat, a 28-foot lifeboat constructed by Bell & Grange of Grimsby, arrived on station in 1832. In the following 32 years, this boat would launch nine times and save 25 lives.

At a meeting of the LCSA on 15 March 1864, it was agreed to transfer all their lifeboats and stations to the management of the RNLI. A new boathouse was constructed to house a new lifeboat, a 30-foot self-righting 'Pulling and Sailing' (P&S) lifeboat, one with oars and sails, built by Forrestt of Limehouse, London. The boat arrived on 28 October 1864, and was named North Briton.

In 1878, the Donna Nook lifeboat would be replaced by a larger 34-foot 10-oared self-righting boat, constructed by Woolfe and Sons. The cost of the boat, carriage and boathouse modifications were provided as a gift from Miss Dixon, of Holton Park, Lincolnshire, in memory of her brother. The boathouse was named Richard Roadley Dixon Lifeboat Establishment, Donna Nook. At a ceremony in the town of Louth on 13 December 1878, the boat was named Richard and presented to the Institution. She carried on her bow, the inscription "Lord Save Us Lest We Perish".

Two more lifeboats would serve at Donna Nook, both named Richard, and both again provided from the generosity of Miss Dixon.

In 1922, Donna Nook was one of the first lifeboat stations to receive a tractor to assist with the launch of the lifeboat. This was T9, one of 19 manufactured by Clayton for the RNLI.

With increasing numbers of motor-powered lifeboats, including the Humber lifeboat at Spurn Point, able to travel further and faster than the traditional pulling and sailing lifeboats, the decision was made to close Donna Nook Lifeboat Station in 1931. In 102 years service, the lifeboat had been launched 92 times, with 164 lives saved.

The Richard (ON 522) would later serve at Whitby as the Jacob and Rachel Vallentine. No evidence remains of the Richard Roadley Dixon Lifeboat Establishment, Donna Nook boat house, which was located at a site, later to become Donna Nook RAF Station.

== Notable rescues ==
On Christmas Eve, 1921, the Richard (ON 522) was launched to the aid of the fishing boat Koivisto. She had been adrift at sea for 9 days, following engine failure, finally coming ashore at Saltfleet haven. After struggling through rough seas, the lifeboat arrived at the vessel, and rescued the crew of four. However, whilst standing by while a tug attempted to save the vessel, the lifeboat was capsized, throwing 11 crew and the four rescuees into the water. Fortunately, everyone was recovered to the lifeboat, and then to the tug. With the fishing boat and lifeboat in tow, all were taken safely to Grimsby. For this service, John Dobson, Acting Coxswain, and all the lifeboat crew, were accorded "The Thanks of the Institution inscribed on Vellum".

== Station honours ==
The following are awards made at Donna Nook

- RNLI Silver Medal

Thomas Dobson, Coxswain – 1869

- RNLI Bronze Medal

John Thomas Dobson, Coxswain – 1925

- The Thanks of the Institution inscribed on Vellum

William Robinson, Honorary Secretary – 1870

Mr Houlden, Honorary Secretary – 1884

John Dobson, Acting Coxswain – 1921
Every member of the Donna Nook Lifeboat – 1921

George Humberstone, Second Coxswain – 1925
Fred Wilson, Bowman – 1925

== Roll of honour ==
In memory of those lost whilst serving Donna Nook lifeboat.

- Drowned whilst trying to launch the lifeboat to the brig Economy of Grimsby, 21 November 1884

John Phillips, Coastguard Officer (33)

- Lost whilst trying to launch the lifeboat to the brig Mermaid of Whitby, 13 March 1886

Dan William Brooks, crew member (22)
Alfred Richards, volunteer (35)

== Donna Nook lifeboats ==
=== LCSA lifeboats ===
Name	Built	On station	Class	Comments
Unnamed	1805	1829−1830	30-foot Greathead	(Note: 30-foot x 10-foot (12-oared) Greathead-class non-self-righting lifeboat, funded latterly by the LSCA, built by Henry Greathead of South Shields, costing £150.); Previously at Bridlington and Saltfleet (LCSA).
Unnamed	1829	1830−1832	22-foot Plenty non-self-righting	(Note: 22-foot x 7-foot (6-oared) Plenty-class non-self-righting lifeboat, funded by the LCSA, built by William Plenty of Newbury, Berkshire, costing £143 when new.); On load from Theddlethorpe.
Unnamed	1832	1832−1864	28-foot Non-self-righting	(Note: 28-foot x 7-foot (8-oared) non-self-righting lifeboat, built by Bell & Grange of Grimsby, costing £100.)

=== RNLI lifeboats ===
ON (Note: ON is the RNLI's Official Number of the boat.)	Name	Built	On station	Class	Comments
Pre-411	North Briton	1864	1864−1878	30-foot Peake Self-righting (P&S)	(Note: 30-foot x 7-foot 3in (8-oared) Peake-class self-righting (P&S) lifeboat, gift of the Rt. Hon. & Miss How of London, built by Forrestt of Limehouse, London, costing £215.)
Pre-634	Richard	1878	1878−1889	34-foot Self-righting (P&S)	(Note: 34-foot x 8-foot (10-oared) self-righting (P&S) lifeboat, gift of Miss A. Dixon of Holton le Moor, Lincolnshire, built by Woolfe of Shadwell, London, costing £363.)
248	Richard	1889	1889−1904	34-foot Self-righting (P&S)	(Note: 34-foot x 7-foot 6in (10-oared) self-righting (P&S) lifeboat, gift of Miss A. Dixon of West Caistor, Lincolnshire, built by Woolfe of Shadwell, London, costing £422.)
522	Richard	1904	1904−1931	34-foot Dungeness Self-righting (P&S)	(Note: 34-foot x 8-foot (10-oared) Dungeness-class (Rubie) self-righting (P&S) lifeboat, gift of Miss A. Dixon of West Caistor, Lincolnshire, built by Thames Ironworks of Blackwall, London, costing £665.)

Pre ON numbers are unofficial numbers used by the Lifeboat Enthusiasts' Society to reference early lifeboats not included on the official RNLI list.

=== Launch and recovery tractors ===
Op. No. (Note: Op. No. is the RNLI's Operational Number carried on the hull.)	Reg. No.	Type	On station	Comments
T9	BE 9914	Clayton	1922–1931	

== See also ==
- List of RNLI stations
- List of former RNLI stations
- Royal National Lifeboat Institution lifeboats
