= Chapel St Leonards =

Village and civil parish in Lincolnshire, England

Coordinates: 53.2230°N 0.3365°E

- Village and Civil Parish
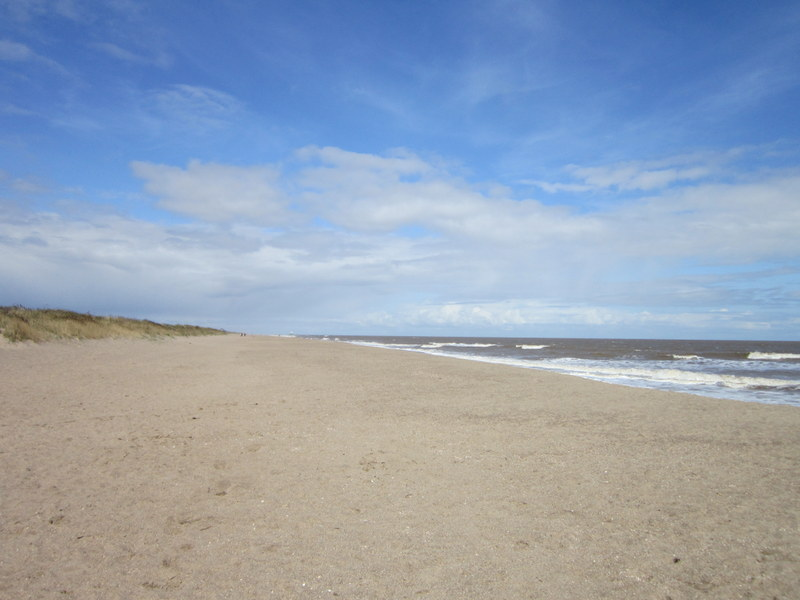
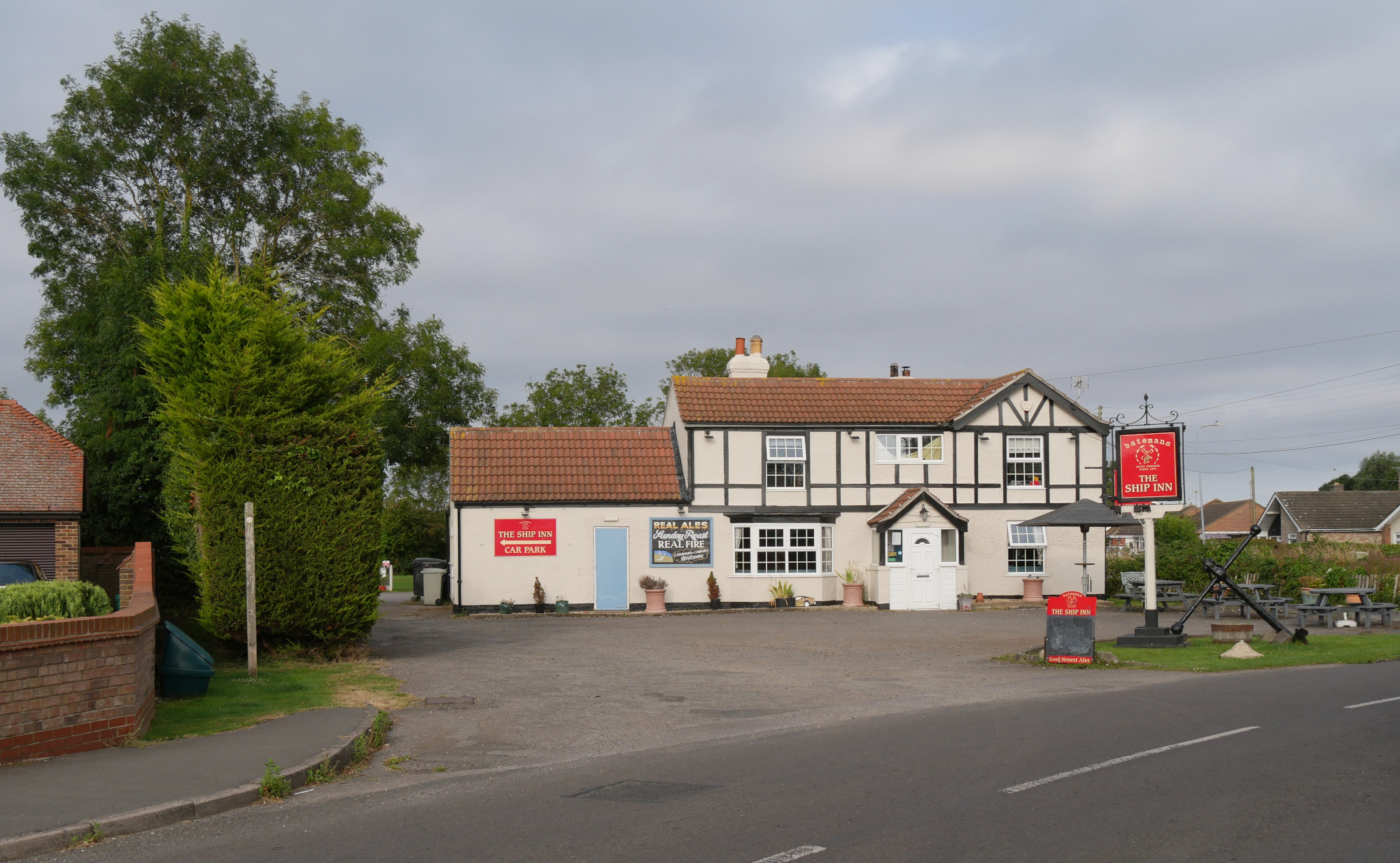
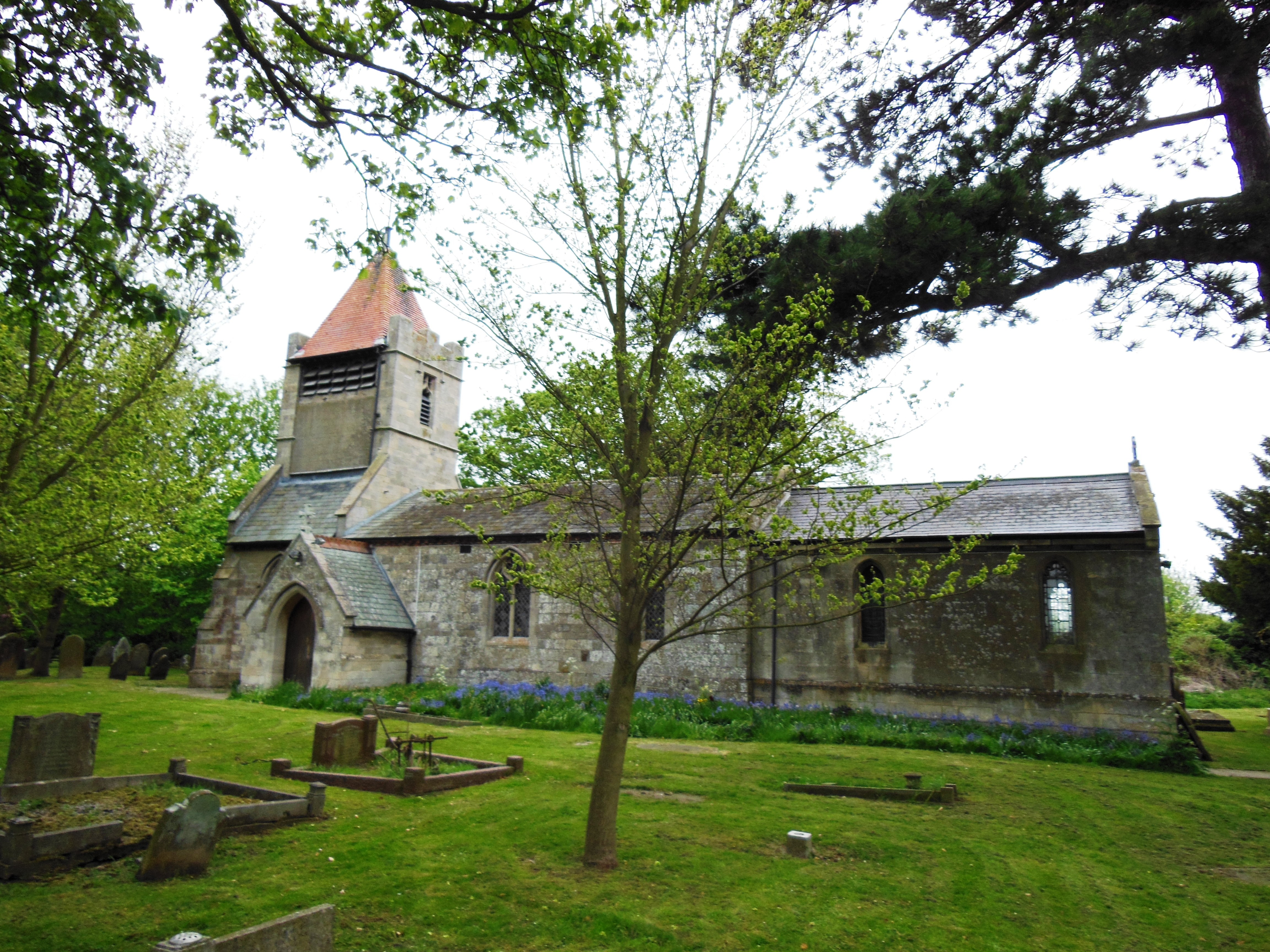
- Chapel Six Marshes The Ship Inn St Leonard’s

- Location within Lincolnshire
- Population: 3,384 (2011)
- OS grid reference: TF5672
  - London: 115 mi (185 km) S
- District: East Lindsey
- Shire county: Lincolnshire
- Region: East Midlands
- Country: England
- Sovereign state: United Kingdom
- Post town: SKEGNESS
- Postcode district: PE24
- Dialling code: 01754
- Police: Lincolnshire
- Fire: Lincolnshire
- Ambulance: East Midlands
- UK Parliament: Boston and Skegness

Chapel St. Leonards is a seaside resort village and civil parish in the East Lindsey district of Lincolnshire, England. It is situated 5 miles (8 km) north from the resort of Skegness and just north of Ingoldmells. It also lies right next to the North Sea.

The village is a location for caravan park holidays as well as campsites, and is next to several miles of beach, and close to Fantasy Island, market towns, and the Lincolnshire Wolds.

A landmark is Chapel Point, 1 mile (1.6 km) north from the centre of the village. It has a restored part of a major Second World War coastal defence line retaining the viewing platform. The adjacent North Sea Observatory, a visitors' centre providing a facility for year-round use, was constructed between 2016 and 2018.

In recent years Chapel Point has become a location for birdwatchers, being visited by migrating birds such as the Mediterranean gull.

== Governance ==
An electoral ward of the same name exists. This ward stretches west to Hogsthorpe with a total population taken at the 2011 census of 4,684.

== North Sea Observatory ==
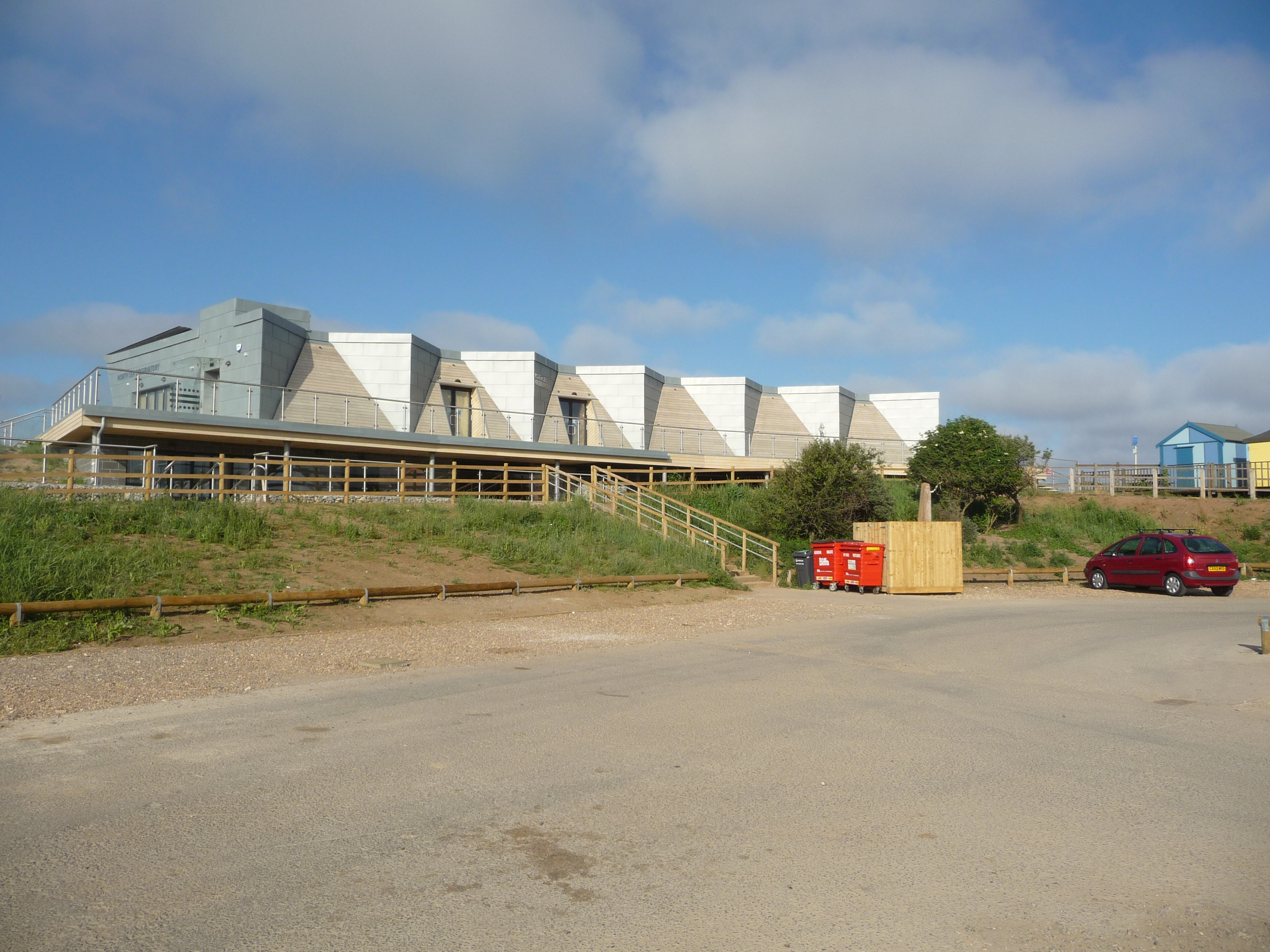
Car park with staircase and newly constructed disabled ramp adjacent to beach chalets leading down to car park level to the right

The UK's first purpose-built marine observatory, it was first conceived in 2005 with plans revealed to the public in July 2013. Planning permission was granted at the end of 2014 with the build between 2016 and 2018 funded mainly from Lincolnshire County Council and additionally from Arts Council England and the Coastal Communities Fund. (Note: Planning permission is sought for a North Sea Observatory and Cafe at Chapel Point, Chapel St Leonards Lincolnshire County Council, 4 December 2013. Retrieved 2 August 2018)

It is the first stage of what is envisaged as part of the Lincolnshire Coastal Country Park (LCCP) with an intention to later develop the coastal walk as a visitor attraction northwards to Sandilands. The site is owned by Chapel St Leonards Parish Council and is leased to the County Council.

Included into the futuristic design having main viewing windows orientated towards the sea, the observatory has multi-function spaces allocated for an exhibition gallery and education, together with a local base for Coastwatch and a year-round cafe.

Despite a televised press-launch and announcements of opening 22 June 2018, the centre did not open to the public, with several local journals carrying the same information from a Lincolnshire County Council press release citing further delays due to building snagging works. The centre finally opened 30 July 2018.

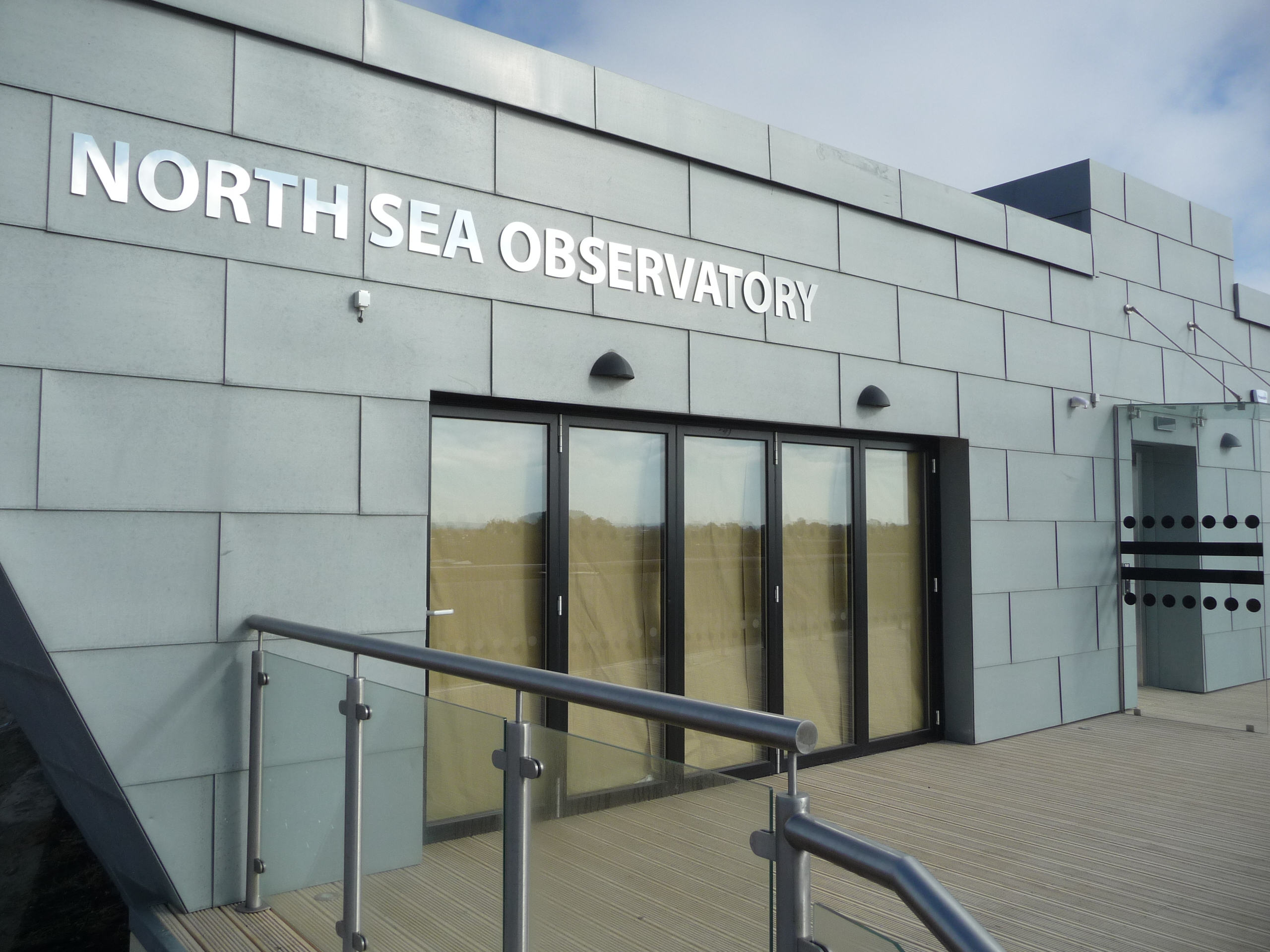
Entrance and the only disabled access via lift (seen to right)

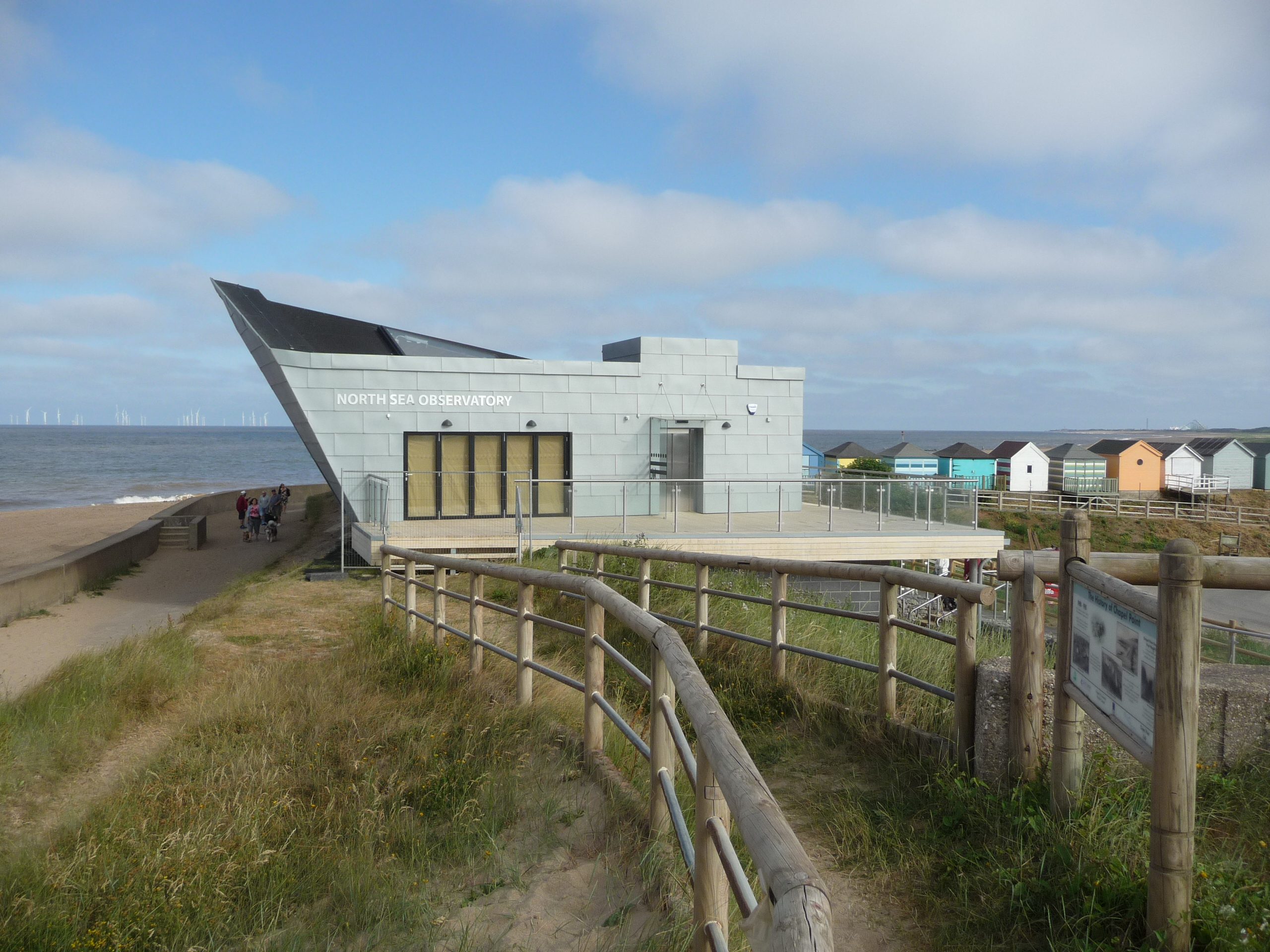
Outside viewing deck with walkway to the north linking-in to existing paths

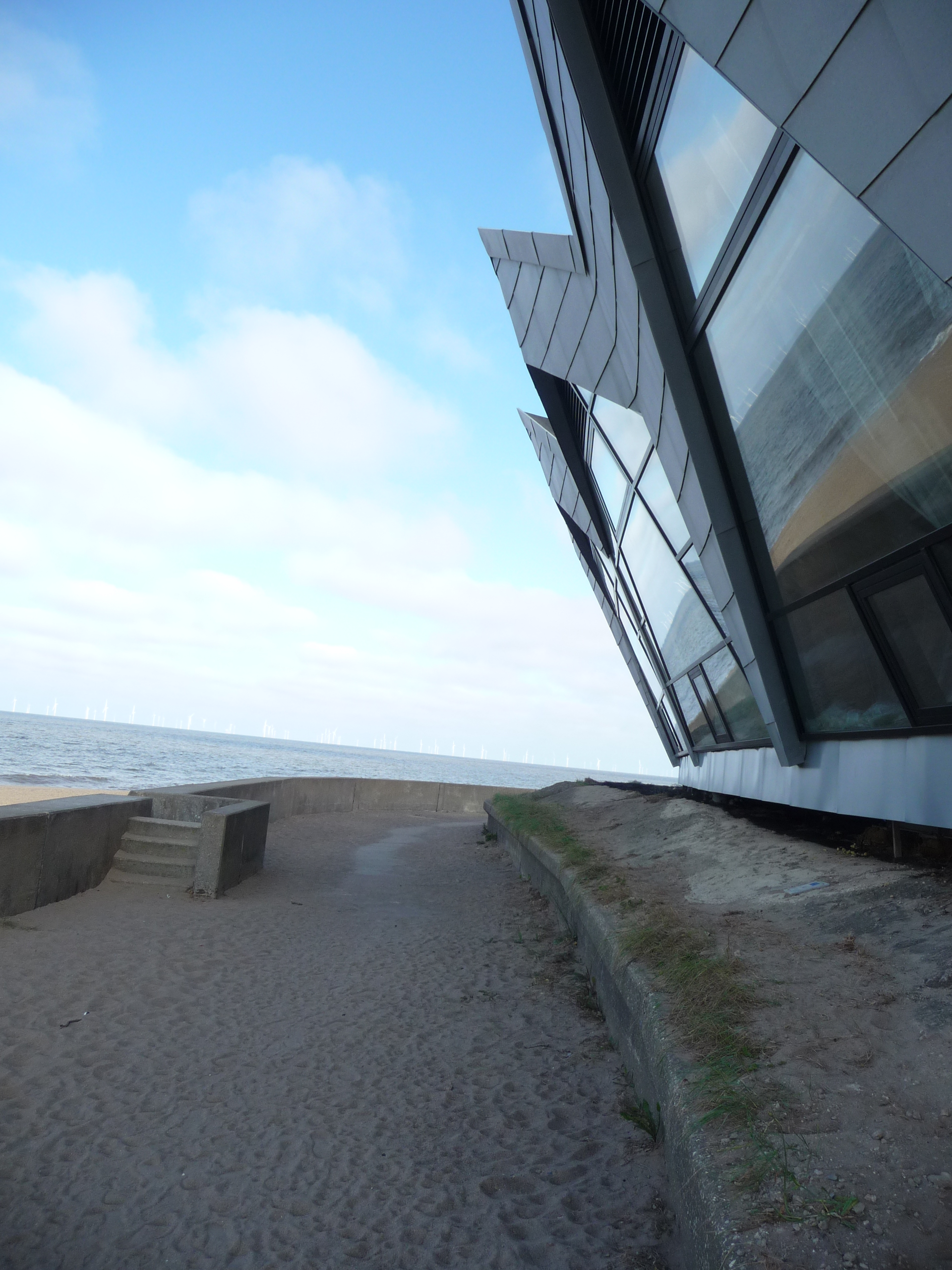
Example of the main viewing windows with coastal path around the Chapel Point promontory

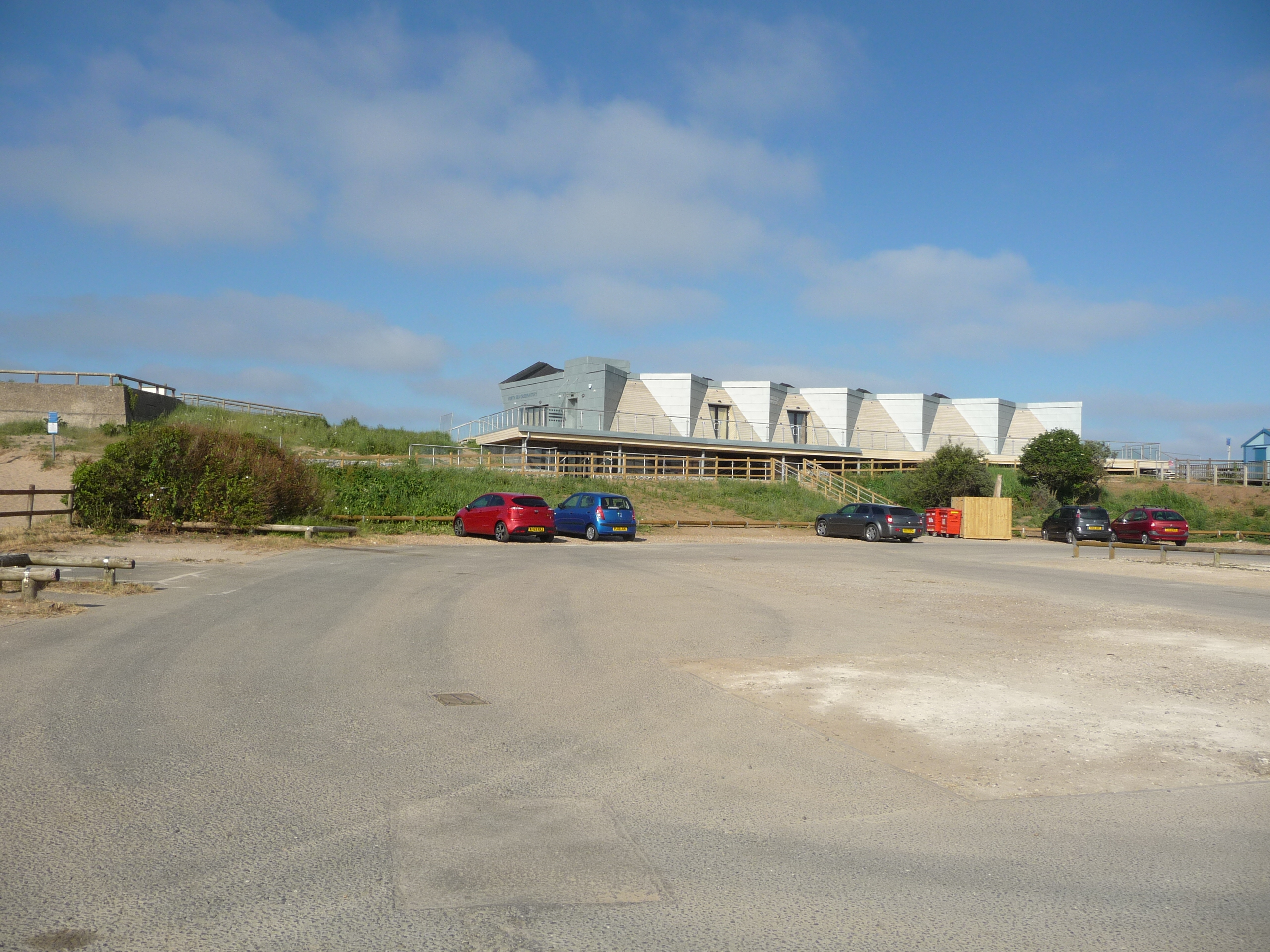
Car park with old gun emplacement visible to left

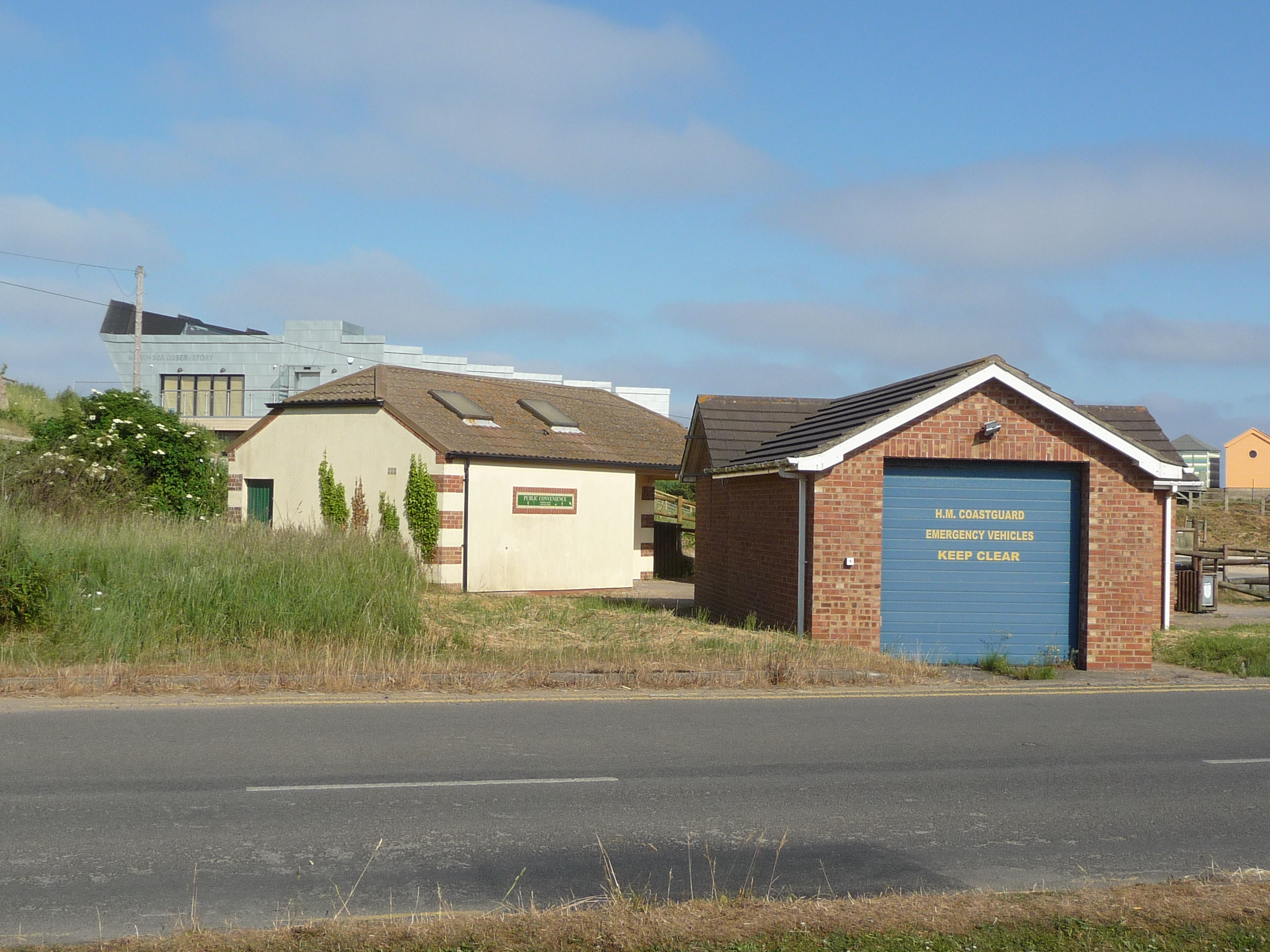
Observatory to rear in elevated position above public toilets and Coastguard building on coast road

== Chapel and church ==
The name of the village derives from a chapel at Mumby dedicated to St Leonard; the village history is tied to that of Mumby, both at one time being part of the same ecclesiastical parish.

The village Anglican church, also dedicated to St Leonard, was rebuilt in 1572 after a flood, and again rebuilt in 1794 on a smaller scale. There was further rebuilding in 1866 and in 1901 when the church was lengthened and the red-tiled tower, unique in Lincolnshire, was added. In 1924 the chapel was again enlarged and lengthened, and a new east window and reredos added. The present church holds parish registers dating from 1665, although bishops' transcripts go back as far as 1568.

== Twinned Village ==
Chapel St Leonards has been twinned since 1998 with Cérans-Foulletourte, a township in the Sarthe department in the region of Pays de la Loire, in north-western France.
