= Sandown and Shanklin Independent Lifeboat Station =

Lifeboat station on the Isle of Wight, UK

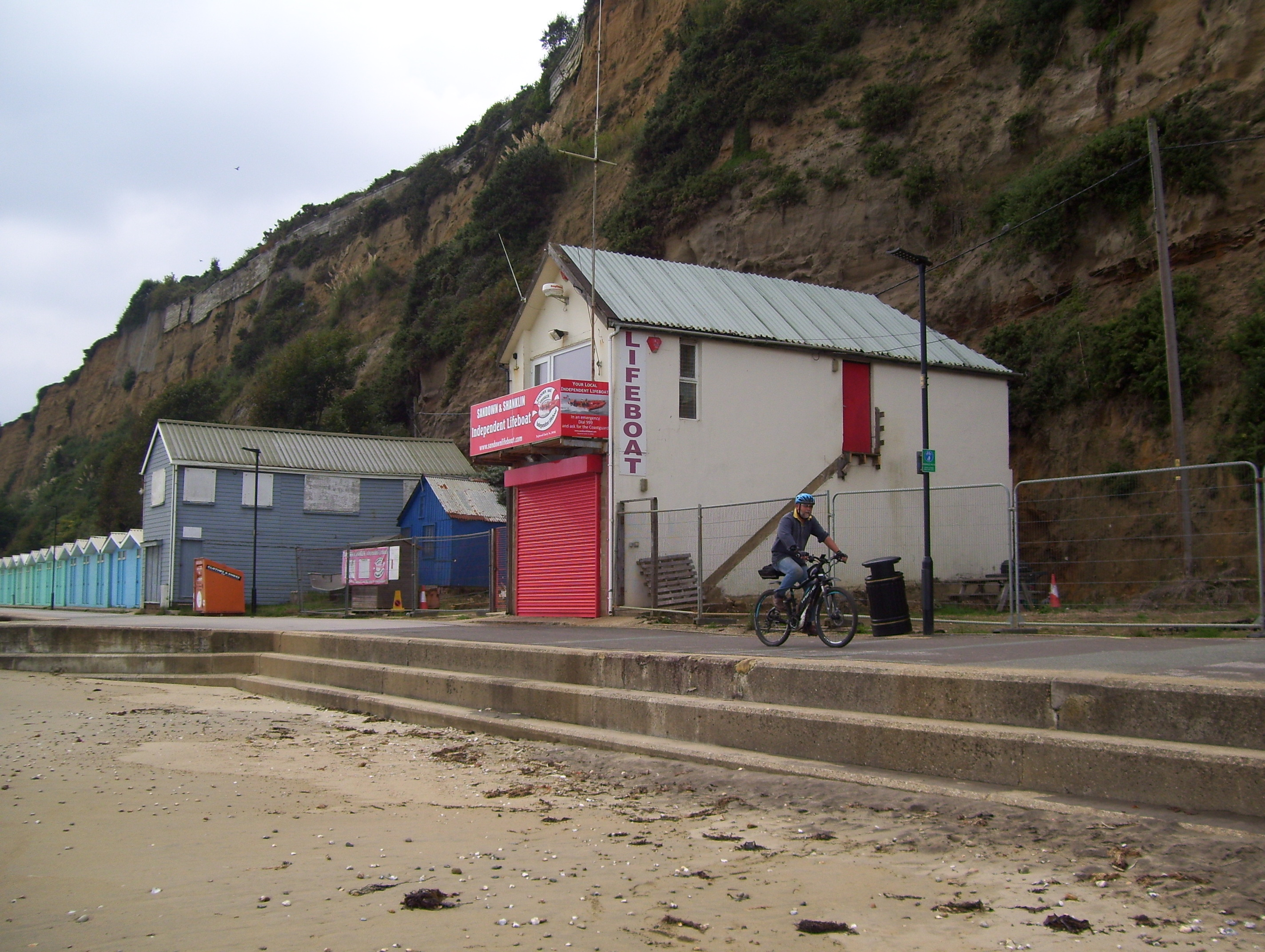
- Sandown and Shanklin Independent Lifeboat Station

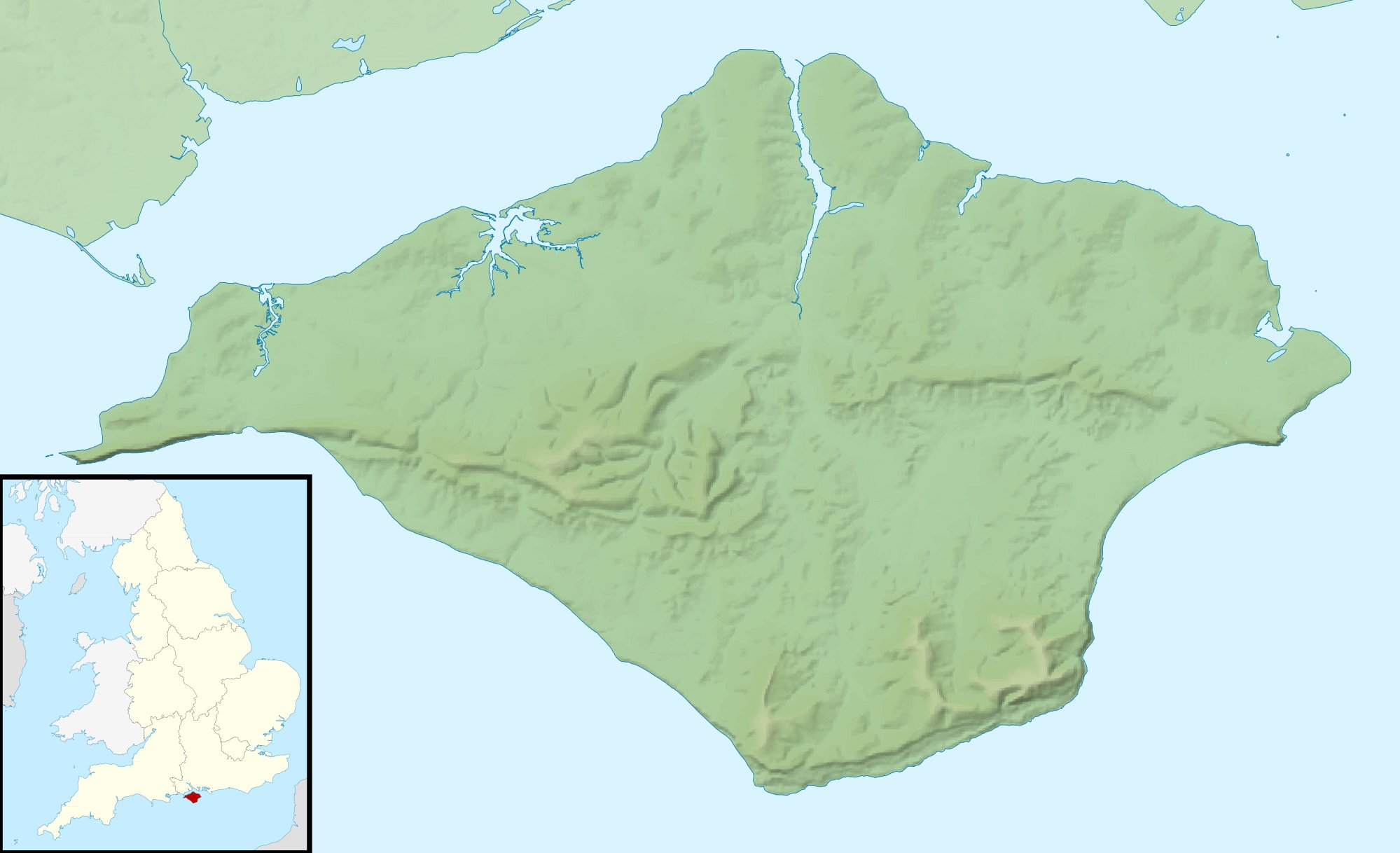
- Location within Isle of Wight

General information
- Type: RNLI Lifeboat Station
- Location: Western Esplanade, Sandown, Isle of Wight, PO36 8JS, England
- Coordinates: 50.650404°N 1.159498°W
- Owner: Sandown & Shanklin Independent Lifeboat

Website
- Sandown and Shanklin Independent Lifeboat

Sandown and Shanklin Independent Lifeboat Station is located at a boathouse on the Western Esplanade at Sandown, a town overlooking Sandown Bay, on the south-east coast of the Isle of Wight, England.

Established in 1988 as South Wight Inshore Rescue, the station is operated by the Sandown and Shanklin Independent Lifeboat Service (SSILB).

The station currently operates an Atlantic 21 Rigid inflatable boat (RIB), The Dove II, on station since 2011.

== History ==
Ever since its founding in 1824, the Royal National Institution for the Preservation of Life from Shipwreck (RNIPLS), later to become the Royal National Lifeboat Institution (RNLI) in 1854, would award medals for deeds of gallantry at sea, even if no lifeboats were involved.

On 24 March 1866, the Swedish brig Fahle Bure of Sundsvall was wrecked in a gale in Sandown Bay, with eight crew aboard. Five men were rescued by a coastguard boat, with the remaining crew rescued by four men in a local boat. John Bunt, Chief Boatman, and Mr Francis Hayden were each awarded the RNLI Silver Medal.

Inspired by other Sunday School groups, raising funds to provide a local lifeboat, the Isle of Wight Sunday Schools set about their own fundraising, ultimately raising £162 by June 1868. A 29-foot Lamb and White lifeboat was ordered, and was launched at Prince's Green, West Cowes, on 29 June 1868. The lifeboat was named Dove, and moved to Yarmouth later in 1868, before being relocated to Totland Bay in 1870. In 1884, the Dove was moved again, this time to the opposite side of the island, to Shanklin.

The move to Shanklin was prompted by the imminent placement of an RNLI lifeboat at Totland Bay, but the location may have been chosen following the wreck of the French brigantine Jeune Gustave of Brest. In a south-west gale of 10 February 1883, the vessel was wrecked off Red Cliff, Sandown Bay. For his efforts with his five crew, rescuing all five men from the brigantine, Chief Boatman William H. Arnold of H.M. Coastguard Sandown was awarded the RNLI Silver Medal.

A boathouse was constructed near to the coastguard station, at the southern end of the esplanade, on the shore at Shanklin. No details of any service have been found.During a storm in November 1916, the boathouse was smashed open, and the lifeboat was washed away and wrecked. The boat was never replaced, and Shanklin lifeboat station closed.

== 1980s onwards ==
In 1988, a lifeboat station was re-established in the area, with the creation of South Wight Inshore Rescue. The organisation later became Sandown and Shanklin Independent Lifeboat. A station building once again stands near the shore, although this time at Sandown, approximately 2 miles (3.2 km) from the former location in Shanklin

On Friday 12 July 2024, in front of an audience of over 100 guests at the Broadway Centre, Sandown, including MPs, and the present and former mayors, Mrs Susie Sheldon, Lord Lieutenant of the Isle of Wight, presented the Coxswain and crew of the Sandown and Shanklin Independent Lifeboat with The King's Award for Voluntary Service.

Solent Rescue is a registered charity (No. 267039), supported entirely by public donation.

== Station honours ==
The following are awards made at Sandown.

- RNLI Silver Medal

John Bunt, Chief Boatman in Charge, H.M. Coastguard, Sandown – 1866
Francis Hayden – 1866

William H. Arnold, Chief Boatman in Charge, H.M. Coastguard, Sandown – 1883

- The King's Award for Voluntary Service

Sandown and Shanklin Independent Lifeboat Station – 2023

== Lifeboats ==
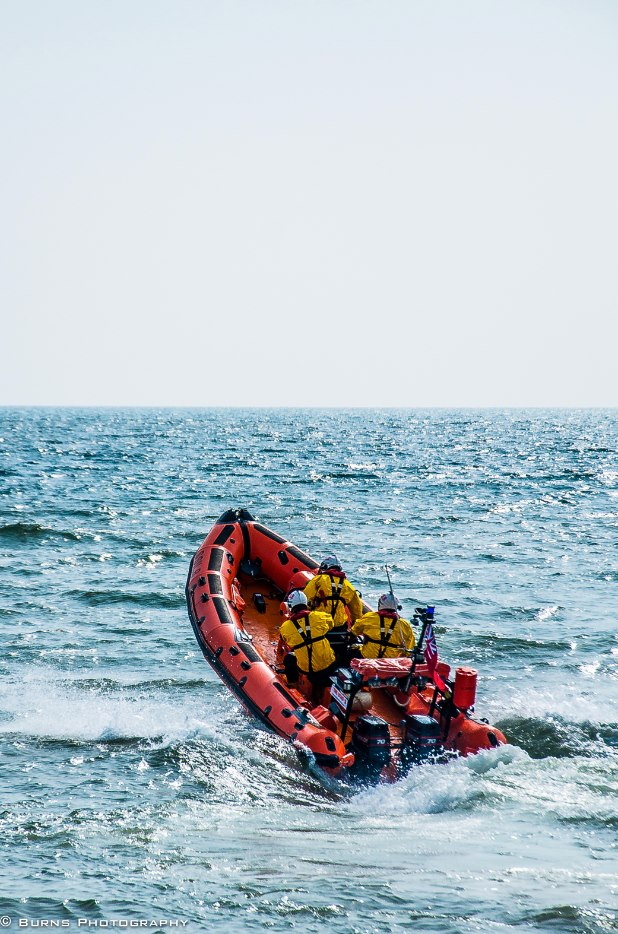
The Dove II in a training session

From 2000, the organisation operated an Atlantic 21 Rigid inflatable boat (RIB) Inshore lifeboat, powered by twin 70 hp Evinrude engines, and formerly operated by the RNLI. This lifeboat was previously named Kirklees (B-553) and served at Newbiggin and Helvick Head, before being sold to the SSILB. The lifeboat was renamed Dove, in honour of a previous lifeboat operated in Shanklin between 1884 and 1916. This Inshore lifeboat was later sold to Lagan Search & Rescue (LSAR) in 2013, for operations around Belfast, Northern Ireland.

In 2011, SSILB launched their current Inshore Lifeboat, again an Atlantic 21-class. The former RNLI Inshore lifeboat, Wolverson X-Ray (B-590), had previously been placed in the RNLI relief fleet, and had served at a number of stations, including Mudeford, Aberystwyth, Kilrush, Galway, Youghal and Cullercoats. The boat was then used for training, before being sold to the SSILB. The lifeboat was renamed Dove II.

== Sandown and Shanklin independent lifeboats ==
Name	On Station	Class	MMSI	Comments
Dove	2000–2011	Atlantic 21	–	Formerly RNLB Kirklees (B-553) at Newbiggin and Helvick Head
Dove II	2011–	Atlantic 21	235067206	Formerly RNLB Wolverson X-Ray (B-590).

== See also ==
- Independent lifeboats in Britain and Ireland
- List of former RNLI stations
