= Atlantic 21-class lifeboat =

Inshore lifeboat class of the RNLI

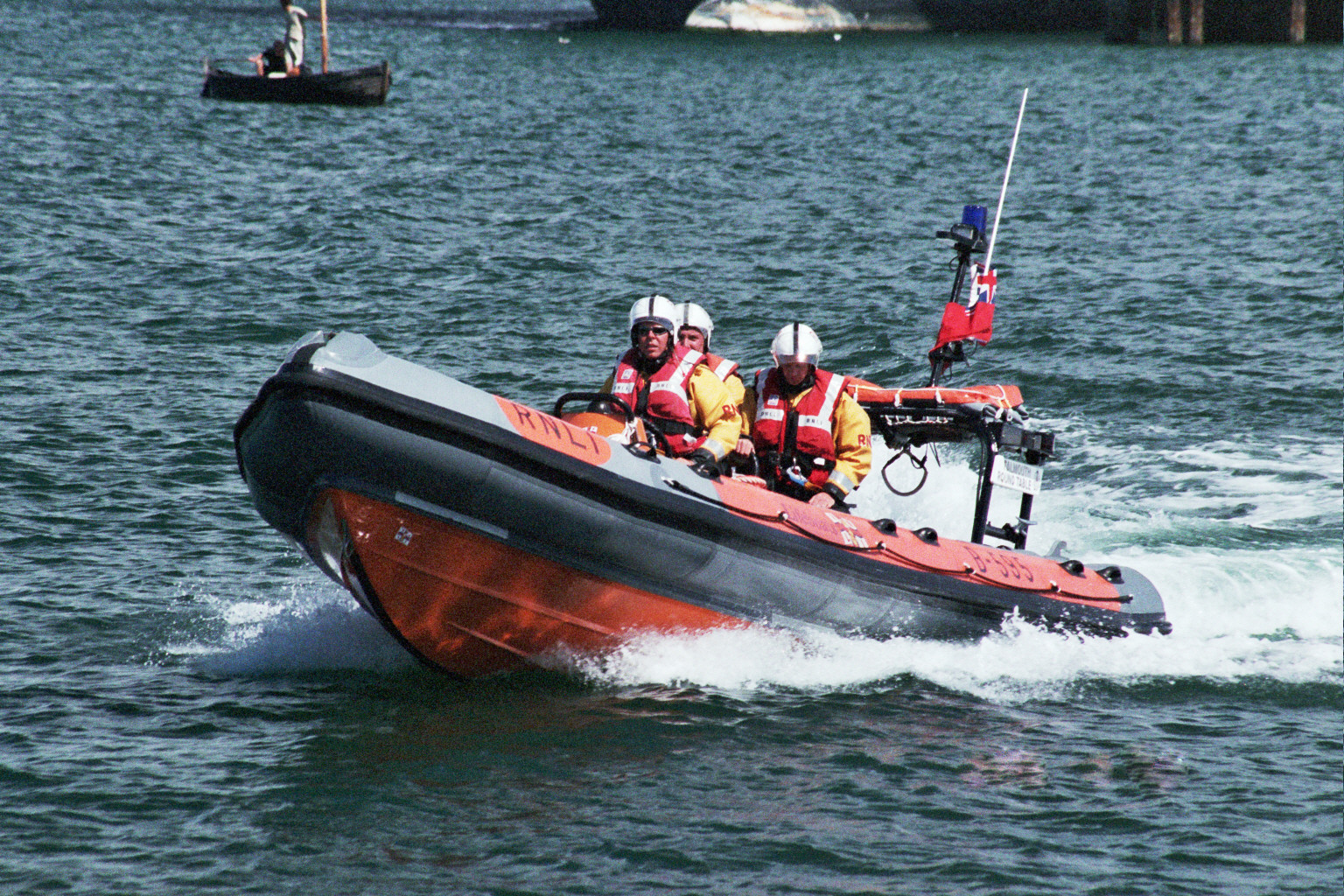
- Falmouth Round Table (B-595) during Falmouth Lifeboat Day, August 2006.

Class overview
- Name: B class (Atlantic 21)
- Builders: Inshore Lifeboat Centre, Cowes
- Operators: Royal National Lifeboat Institution
- Preceded by: C class
- Succeeded by: B class (Atlantic 75)
- Built: 1969–1994
- In service: 1972–2007
- Completed: 96
- Lost: 1
- Preserved: 1

General characteristics
- Type: Lifeboat
- Displacement: 1.4 tonnes
- Length: 7.21 m (23 ft 8 in)
- Beam: 2.49 m (8 ft 2 in)
- Draught: 0.81 m (2 ft 8 in)
- Propulsion: 2 × 70 hp (52 kW) 2-stroke outboard engines
- Speed: 32 knots (59 km/h; 37 mph)
- Endurance: 3 hours
- Capacity: 22
- Complement: 3

The Atlantic 21 Inshore lifeboat was the first generation rigid inflatable boat (RIB), in the B-class series of Inshore lifeboats, that were operated around the shores of the British Isles and the Channel Islands by the Royal National Lifeboat Institution (RNLI), between 1972 and 2008.

The Inshore boat was designed at Atlantic College in South Wales, the birthplace of the RIB, after which the craft is named. The college was also one of nine locations where the RNLI first established lifeboat stations using smaller inshore watercraft. Atlantic College Lifeboat Station was operated by the RNLI between 1963 and 2013.

The development of the Atlantic 21 resulted in the larger Atlantic 75-class, with production beginning in 1993. The Atlantic 75 gradually replaced the Atlantic 21, with the majority of the ninety-six Atlantic 21 lifeboats retired from service by 2006. Just a handful remained on service into 2007 and 2008, with the last two Atlantic 21 lifeboats, at Enniskillen Lifeboat Station (Upper and Lower), both withdrawn from operational duties on 26 February 2008.

== Description ==
The Atlantic 21 can be launched from a davit, carriage or floating boathouse depending on the location of the station and the available facilities.

The lifeboat is a rigid inflatable boat (RIB), with the hull constructed of Fibre-reinforced plastic, subdivided into water-tight compartments, and manufactured at Halmatic Ltd. of Havant. The boats are then fitted out at the RNLI Inshore Lifeboat Centre at East Cowes, Isle of Wight. A roll-bar is fitted above the engines, which carries an inflatable air-bag for self-righting, which can be inflated by a crew-member from a gas bottle should the boat capsize.

The boat carries a variety of equipment which includes two VHF radios, first aid kit and oxygen, GPS navigation system, night vision equipment, self-righting system, anchor and various warps, toolkit, towing system, illuminating and distress pyrotechnics, spotlight, torches.

All of the following fleet details are referenced to the 2026 Lifeboat Enthusiast Society Handbook, with information retrieved directly from RNLI records.

== Atlantic 21 fleet ==
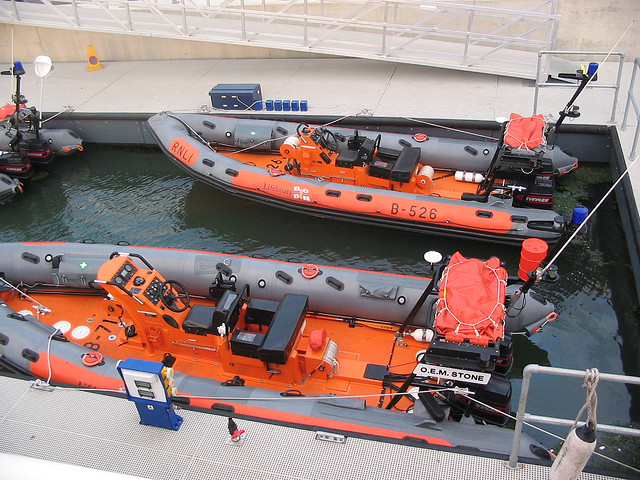
Atlantic 21 B-526 alongside Atlantic 75 B-713 in 2005

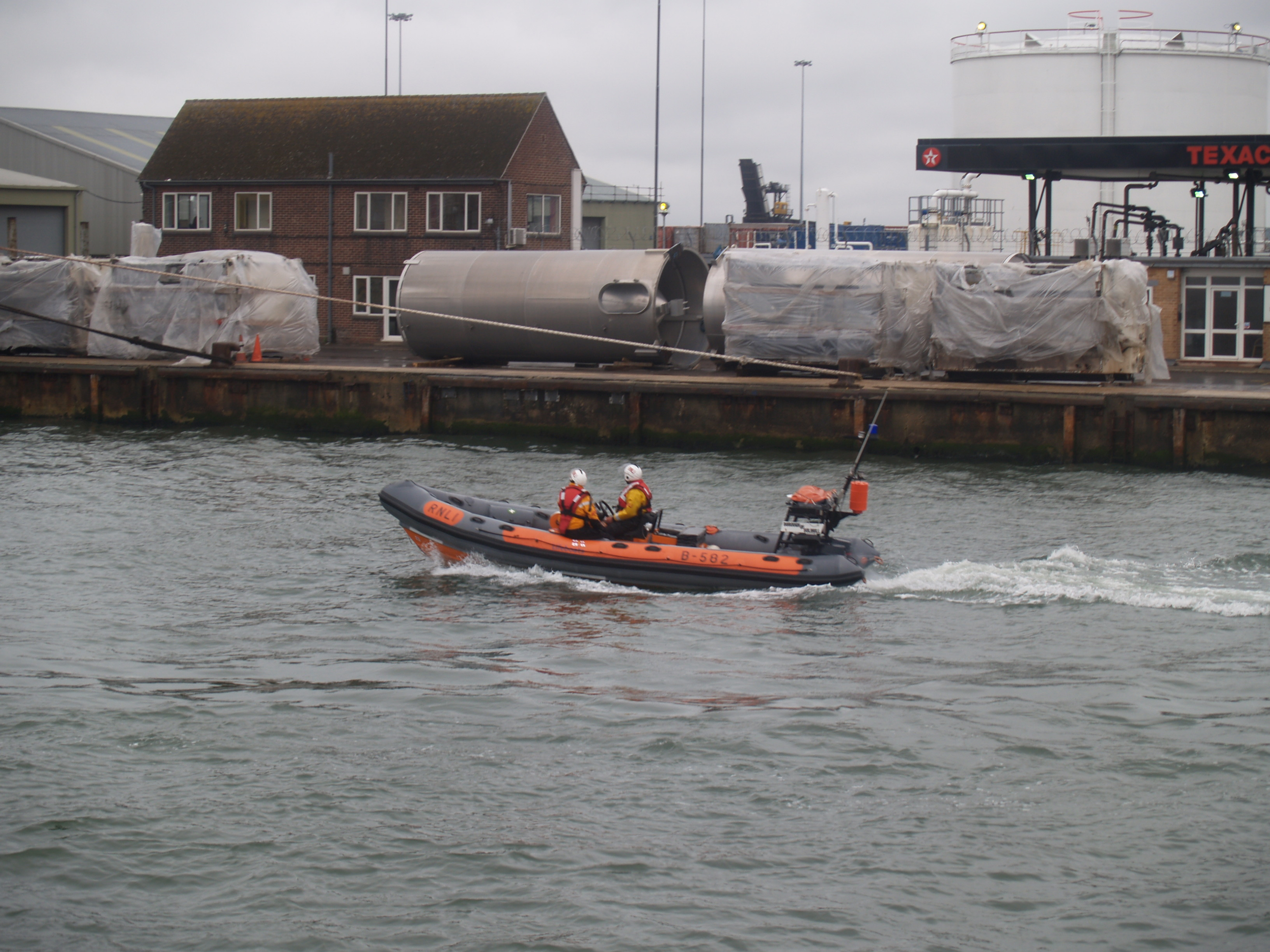
Atlantic 21 B-582 in Poole Harbour in 2007

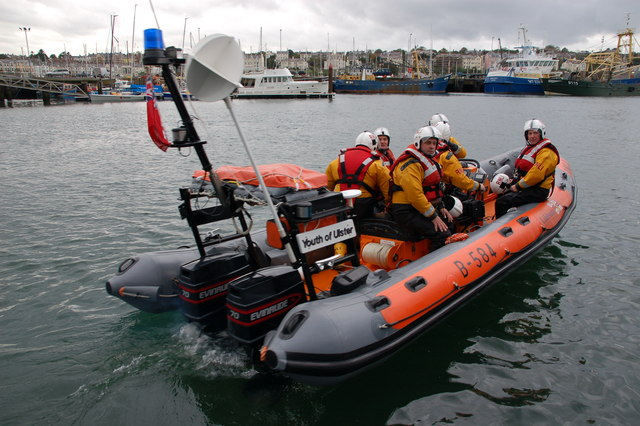
Atlantic 21 B-584 on exercise in Bangor Bay in 2006

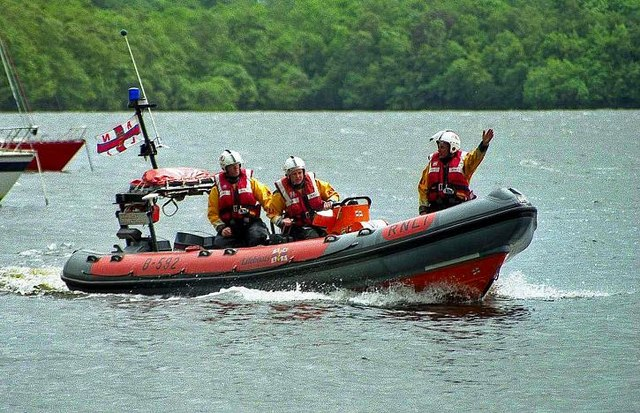
Atlantic 21 B-592 on Lough Erne in 2004

Op.No. (Note: Op. No. is the RNLI's Operational Number of the boat carried on the hull.)	Name	In service	Station	Comments
B-500	Unnamed (Note: Not every Atlantic 21-class lifeboat was given a name)	1970	Hartlepool	First Atlantic 21 (Prototype), trialled at various locations. On display in the RNLI Heritage Collection at Chatham Historic Dockyard, December 2025.
B-500	Unnamed	1970	Mudeford	First Atlantic 21 (Prototype), trialled at various locations. On display in the RNLI Heritage Collection at Chatham Historic Dockyard, December 2025.
B-500	Unnamed	1970	Lyme Regis	First Atlantic 21 (Prototype), trialled at various locations. On display in the RNLI Heritage Collection at Chatham Historic Dockyard, December 2025.
B-500	Unnamed	1972	Littlehampton	First Atlantic 21 (Prototype), trialled at various locations. On display in the RNLI Heritage Collection at Chatham Historic Dockyard, December 2025.
B-500	Unnamed	1972	Largs	First Atlantic 21 (Prototype), trialled at various locations. On display in the RNLI Heritage Collection at Chatham Historic Dockyard, December 2025.
B-500	Unnamed	1972–1973	Appledore	First Atlantic 21 (Prototype), trialled at various locations. On display in the RNLI Heritage Collection at Chatham Historic Dockyard, December 2025.
B-500	Unnamed	1973	Littlehampton	First Atlantic 21 (Prototype), trialled at various locations. On display in the RNLI Heritage Collection at Chatham Historic Dockyard, December 2025.
B-500	Unnamed	1973–1977	Relief fleet	First Atlantic 21 (Prototype), trialled at various locations. On display in the RNLI Heritage Collection at Chatham Historic Dockyard, December 2025.
B-501	Unnamed	1970–1973	Relief fleet	
B-501	Unnamed	1973	Lyme Regis	
B-501	Unnamed	1973–1977	Relief fleet	
B-502	Unnamed	1970–1972	Trials	
B-503	Unnamed	1972–1975	Hartlepool	
B-503	Unnamed	1975–1981	Relief fleet	
B-504	Blue Peter I	1972–1973	Littlehampton	
B-505	Major Osman Gabriel	1972–1975	Queensferry	
B-505	Major Osman Gabriel	1975–1979	Relief fleet	
B-505	Major Osman Gabriel	1979–1980	Silloth	
B-505	Major Osman Gabriel	1980–1981	Atlantic College	
B-506	Unnamed	1972–1976	West Mersea	
B-506	Unnamed	1976–1978	Relief fleet	
B-506	Unnamed	1978	Staithes and Runswick	
B-506	Unnamed	1978–1981	Relief fleet	
B-507	Griende	1972–2005	KNRM	
B-508	Unnamed	1973–1980	Atlantic College	
B-509	Unnamed	1973–1981	New Brighton	
B-509	Unnamed	1981–1985	Relief fleet	
B-510	Tuimelaar	1973–<2007	KNRM	
B-511	Co-Operative No.1	1973	Largs	
B-511	Co-Operative No.1	1975–1979	Hayling Island	
B-511	Co-Operative No.1	1981–1982	Newbiggin	
B-511	Co-Operative No.1	1982	Hunstanton	
B-511	Co-Operative No.1	1982–1985	Relief fleet	
B-511	Co-Operative No.1	1985–1989	Clacton-on-Sea	
B-511	Co-Operative No.1	1989–1997	Relief fleet	
B-512	U.S.Navy League	1973–1980	Lyme Regis	Damaged by vandals and scrapped
B-512	U.S.Navy League	1980–1990	Relief fleet	Damaged by vandals and scrapped
B-512	U.S.Navy League	1990–1992	Walmer	Damaged by vandals and scrapped
B-512	U.S.Navy League	1992–1994	Relief fleet	Damaged by vandals and scrapped
B-512	U.S.Navy League	1994–1995	Bundoran	Damaged by vandals and scrapped
B-512	U.S.Navy League	1995–1997	Relief fleet	Damaged by vandals and scrapped
B-512	U.S.Navy League	1997–1998	Weymouth	Damaged by vandals and scrapped
B-512	U.S.Navy League	1998	Clifden	Damaged by vandals and scrapped
B-512	U.S.Navy League	1998–1999	Relief fleet	Damaged by vandals and scrapped
B-512	U.S.Navy League	1999–2001	Sligo Bay	Damaged by vandals and scrapped
B-512	U.S.Navy League	2001–2009	Publicity fleet	Damaged by vandals and scrapped
B-513	William McCunn and Broom Church Youth Fellowship	1973–1980	Largs	
B-513	William McCunn and Broom Church Youth Fellowship	1980–1988	Relief fleet	
B-513	William McCunn and Broom Church Youth Fellowship	1988–1990	Bangor	
B-513	William McCunn and Broom Church Youth Fellowship	1990–1997	Relief fleet	
B-514	Guide Friendship 1	1974–1983	Aberdovey	Sold to ICE-SAR
B-514	Guide Friendship 1	1983–1984	Relief fleet	Sold to ICE-SAR
B-514	Guide Friendship 1	1984–1985	Clacton-on-Sea	Sold to ICE-SAR
B-514	Guide Friendship 1	1986	Redcar	Sold to ICE-SAR
B-514	Guide Friendship 1	1986–1991	Relief fleet	Sold to ICE-SAR
B-514	Guide Friendship 1	1991–1992	Cullercoats	Sold to ICE-SAR
B-514	Guide Friendship 1	1992–2000	Relief fleet	Sold to ICE-SAR
B-515	Blue Peter II	1976–1985	Beaumaris	
B-515	Vee Webber	1985–1992	Relief fleet	Sold to ICE-SAR
B-515	Vee Webber	1992–1993	Port Erin	Sold to ICE-SAR
B-515	Vee Webber	1993–1994	Flamborough	Sold to ICE-SAR
B-515	Vee Webber	1994–1996	Relief fleet	Sold to ICE-SAR
B-515	Vee Webber	1996	Penarth	Sold to ICE-SAR
B-515	Vee Webber	1996–2000	Relief fleet	Sold to ICE-SAR
B-516	Whitstable Branch	1974–1983	Whitstable	
B-516	Whitstable Branch	1983–1990	Relief fleet	
B-517	Blue Peter I	1973–1974	Littlehampton	
B-518	Sole Bay	1973–1985	Southwold	Last reported as privately owned at St Helens, Isle of Wight
B-518	Sole Bay	1985–1987	Relief fleet	Last reported as privately owned at St Helens, Isle of Wight
B-518	Sole Bay	1987–1988	Falmouth	Last reported as privately owned at St Helens, Isle of Wight
B-518	Sole Bay	1988–1990	Relief fleet	Last reported as privately owned at St Helens, Isle of Wight
B-519	Surrey Forester	1973–1986	Lymington	
B-519	Surrey Forester	1986–1990	Relief fleet	
B-520	Wildenrath Whizzer	1974–1986	Appledore	
B-520	Wildenrath Whizzer	1986–1990	Redcar	
B-520	Wildenrath Whizzer	1990–1993	Relief fleet	
B-520	Wildenrath Whizzer	1993–2005	Publicity fleet	
B-521	Mary Livingstone	1975–1981	Queensferry	
B-521	Mary Livingstone	1981–1984	Relief fleet	
B-521	Mary Livingstone	1984	Ramsgate	
B-521	Mary Livingstone	1984–1994	Relief fleet	
B-522	Dolfijn	1974–????	KNRM	
B-523	Blue Peter I	1974–1985	Littlehampton	Later named Bay Mermaid I with Cardiff Harbour Authority.
B-523	Unnamed	1985–1988	Relief fleet	Later named Bay Mermaid I with Cardiff Harbour Authority.
B-523	Unnamed	1988	Kirkcudbright	Later named Bay Mermaid I with Cardiff Harbour Authority.
B-523	Unnamed	1988–1995	Relief fleet	Later named Bay Mermaid I with Cardiff Harbour Authority.
B-523	Unnamed	1995–1998	Inshore Lifeboat Centre	Later named Bay Mermaid I with Cardiff Harbour Authority.
B-524	Unnamed	1974–????	KNRM	
B-525	Unnamed	1974–1975	Relief fleet	Named Spix's Macaw after being re-hulled in 1992.
B-525	Unnamed	1975	Blackpool	Named Spix's Macaw after being re-hulled in 1992.
B-525	Unnamed	1975–1979	Relief fleet	Named Spix's Macaw after being re-hulled in 1992.
B-525	Unnamed	1979–1980	Hayling Island	Named Spix's Macaw after being re-hulled in 1992.
B-525	Unnamed	1980–1988	Relief fleet	Named Spix's Macaw after being re-hulled in 1992.
B-525	Unnamed	1988–1991	Kirkcudbright	Named Spix's Macaw after being re-hulled in 1992.
B-525	Unnamed	1991–1992	Relief fleet	Named Spix's Macaw after being re-hulled in 1992.
B-525	Spix's Macaw	1992–1993	Relief fleet	Named Spix's Macaw after being re-hulled in 1992.
B-525	Spix's Macaw	1993	Kilkeel	Named Spix's Macaw after being re-hulled in 1992.
B-525	Spix's Macaw	1993–1998	Relief fleet	Named Spix's Macaw after being re-hulled in 1992.
B-525	Spix's Macaw	1998	Weymouth	Named Spix's Macaw after being re-hulled in 1992.
B-525	Spix's Macaw	1998–1999	Relief fleet	Named Spix's Macaw after being re-hulled in 1992.
B-525	Spix's Macaw	1999	Sligo Bay	Named Spix's Macaw after being re-hulled in 1992.
B-525	Spix's Macaw	1999–2001	Relief fleet	Named Spix's Macaw after being re-hulled in 1992.
B-525	Spix's Macaw	2001	Sligo Bay	Named Spix's Macaw after being re-hulled in 1992.
B-525	Spix's Macaw	2001–2002	Relief fleet	Named Spix's Macaw after being re-hulled in 1992.
B-525	Spix's Macaw	2002–2004	Enniskillin (Upper)	Named Spix's Macaw after being re-hulled in 1992.
B-526	Unnamed	1974–1978	Relief fleet	LifeSaving Victoria, AU, VMR900 Mornington & Hastings, AU. 2010 - Transferred to Lifesaving Victoria (Melbourne, Australia). 2013 - Operated by VMR Mornington & Hastings - Volunteer Marine Rescue Inc - (Mornington, Australia). Renamed LSV 001 (2020)
B-526	Unnamed	1978–1987	Harwich	LifeSaving Victoria, AU, VMR900 Mornington & Hastings, AU. 2010 - Transferred to Lifesaving Victoria (Melbourne, Australia). 2013 - Operated by VMR Mornington & Hastings - Volunteer Marine Rescue Inc - (Mornington, Australia). Renamed LSV 001 (2020)
B-526	Unnamed	1987–1995	Relief fleet	LifeSaving Victoria, AU, VMR900 Mornington & Hastings, AU. 2010 - Transferred to Lifesaving Victoria (Melbourne, Australia). 2013 - Operated by VMR Mornington & Hastings - Volunteer Marine Rescue Inc - (Mornington, Australia). Renamed LSV 001 (2020)
B-526	Unnamed	1995	Hayling Island	LifeSaving Victoria, AU, VMR900 Mornington & Hastings, AU. 2010 - Transferred to Lifesaving Victoria (Melbourne, Australia). 2013 - Operated by VMR Mornington & Hastings - Volunteer Marine Rescue Inc - (Mornington, Australia). Renamed LSV 001 (2020)
B-526	Unnamed	1997–1998	Clacton-on-Sea	LifeSaving Victoria, AU, VMR900 Mornington & Hastings, AU. 2010 - Transferred to Lifesaving Victoria (Melbourne, Australia). 2013 - Operated by VMR Mornington & Hastings - Volunteer Marine Rescue Inc - (Mornington, Australia). Renamed LSV 001 (2020)
B-526	Unnamed	1998–2002	Relief fleet	LifeSaving Victoria, AU, VMR900 Mornington & Hastings, AU. 2010 - Transferred to Lifesaving Victoria (Melbourne, Australia). 2013 - Operated by VMR Mornington & Hastings - Volunteer Marine Rescue Inc - (Mornington, Australia). Renamed LSV 001 (2020)
B-526	Unnamed	2002–2009	Training fleet	LifeSaving Victoria, AU, VMR900 Mornington & Hastings, AU. 2010 - Transferred to Lifesaving Victoria (Melbourne, Australia). 2013 - Operated by VMR Mornington & Hastings - Volunteer Marine Rescue Inc - (Mornington, Australia). Renamed LSV 001 (2020)
B-527	Percy Garon (Civil Service)	1976–1986	Southend-on-Sea	Sold to Finnish Lifeboat Society
B-527	Percy Garon (Civil Service)	1986–1996	Relief fleet	Sold to Finnish Lifeboat Society
B-527	Percy Garon (Civil Service)	1996	Red Bay	Sold to Finnish Lifeboat Society
B-527	Percy Garon (Civil Service)	1996–1998	Relief fleet	Sold to Finnish Lifeboat Society
B-527	Percy Garon (Civil Service)	1998	Arran (Lamlash)	Sold to Finnish Lifeboat Society
B-528	Unnamed	1975–1976	Relief fleet	
B-528	Unnamed	1976–1978	Blackpool	
B-528	Unnamed	1978–1982	Relief fleet	
B-528	Unnamed	1982	Hunstanton	
B-528	Unnamed	1982–1998	Relief fleet	
B-528	Unnamed	1998	Helvick Head	
B-528	Unnamed	1998–2000	Relief fleet	
B-529	Alexander Duckham	1976–1987	West Mersea	
B-529	Alexander Duckham	1988–1990	Mudeford	
B-529	Alexander Duckham	1991–1993	Falmouth	
B-529	Alexander Duckham	1993–2000	Relief fleet	
B-530	Himley Hall	1975–1981	Eastney	
B-530	Himley Hall	1981–1985	Relief fleet	
B-530	Himley Hall	1985–1989	Macduff	
B-530	Himley Hall	1989–1993	Relief fleet	
B-531	Foresters	1975–1988	Great Yarmouth and Gorleston	2002–2011 with Poole Harbour Commission. Sold 2011 to Aegir Nautical.
B-531	Foresters	1988–1993	Relief fleet	2002–2011 with Poole Harbour Commission. Sold 2011 to Aegir Nautical.
B-531	Foresters	1993–1994	Criccieth	2002–2011 with Poole Harbour Commission. Sold 2011 to Aegir Nautical.
B-531	Foresters	1994–1995	Relief fleet	2002–2011 with Poole Harbour Commission. Sold 2011 to Aegir Nautical.
B-531	Foresters	1995	Lough Swilly	2002–2011 with Poole Harbour Commission. Sold 2011 to Aegir Nautical.
B-531	Foresters	1996	Galway	2002–2011 with Poole Harbour Commission. Sold 2011 to Aegir Nautical.
B-531	Foresters	1996–1998	Relief fleet	2002–2011 with Poole Harbour Commission. Sold 2011 to Aegir Nautical.
B-531	Foresters	1998	Clovelly	2002–2011 with Poole Harbour Commission. Sold 2011 to Aegir Nautical.
B-531	Foresters	1998–2001	Relief fleet	2002–2011 with Poole Harbour Commission. Sold 2011 to Aegir Nautical.
B-531	Foresters	2001	Sligo Bay	2002–2011 with Poole Harbour Commission. Sold 2011 to Aegir Nautical.
B-531	Foresters	2001–2002	Relief fleet	2002–2011 with Poole Harbour Commission. Sold 2011 to Aegir Nautical.
B-532	Guide Friendship III	1976–1986	Hartlepool	Sold to Finnish Lifeboat Society
B-532	Guide Friendship III	1986–1998	Relief fleet	Sold to Finnish Lifeboat Society
B-533	Unnamed	1976–1988	Littlestone-on-Sea	
B-533	Unnamed	1988–1990	Relief fleet	
B-533	Unnamed	1990–1991	Teignmouth	
B-533	Unnamed	1991–1992	Relief fleet	
B-533	Unnamed	1992–1993	Kilkeel	
B-533	Unnamed	1993–1995	Relief fleet	
B-533	Unnamed	1995	Kinghorn	
B-533	Unnamed	1995–1996	Relief fleet	
B-533	Unnamed	1996	Galway	
B-533	Unnamed	1996–1998	Relief fleet	
B-534	Unnamed	–	–	1975. Reported to have been sold to MOD
B-535	R.A.O.B.	1975–1976	Hartlepool	Sold 2011. Renamed Aga B, private ownership in Szczecin, Poland, used for pleasure, training and safety boat (also cooperating with local volunteer rescue services)
B-535	R.A.O.B.	1976–1992	Berwick-upon-Tweed	Sold 2011. Renamed Aga B, private ownership in Szczecin, Poland, used for pleasure, training and safety boat (also cooperating with local volunteer rescue services)
B-535	R.A.O.B.	1992–1995	Relief fleet	Sold 2011. Renamed Aga B, private ownership in Szczecin, Poland, used for pleasure, training and safety boat (also cooperating with local volunteer rescue services)
B-535	R.A.O.B.	1995–1997	Kyle of Lochalsh	Sold 2011. Renamed Aga B, private ownership in Szczecin, Poland, used for pleasure, training and safety boat (also cooperating with local volunteer rescue services)
B-535	Clara T	1997–2010	Ballybunion Sea & Cliff Rescue	Sold 2011. Renamed Aga B, private ownership in Szczecin, Poland, used for pleasure, training and safety boat (also cooperating with local volunteer rescue services)
B-536	Unnamed	1976–1989	Peel	
B-536	Unnamed	1989–1992	Relief fleet	
B-536	Unnamed	1992–1994	Sheringham	
B-536	Unnamed	1994–1997	Relief fleet	
B-536	Unnamed	1997	Helvick Head	
B-536	Unnamed	1997–1999	Relief fleet	
B-537	Unnamed	1976–1978	Relief fleet	
B-537	Unnamed	1978–1979	Blackpool	
B-537	Unnamed	1979–1983	Relief fleet	
B-537	Unnamed	1983–1984	Youghal	
B-537	Unnamed	1984–1986	Relief fleet	
B-537	Unnamed	1986–1988	St Abbs	
B-537	Unnamed	1988–1999	Relief fleet	
B-538	Lord Brotherton	1978–1989	Staithes and Runswick	
B-538	Lord Brotherton	1989–1990	Relief fleet	
B-538	Lord Brotherton	1990	Teignmouth	
B-539	Lions International District 105 SE	1978–1989	Brighton	
B-539	Lions International District 105 SE	1989–1990	Relief fleet	
B-539	Lions International District 105 SE	1990–1991	St Catherine	
B-539	Lions International District 105 SE	1991–1994	Relief fleet	
B-539	Lions International District 105 SE	1994	Sheringham	
B-539	Lions International District 105 SE	1994–1995	Relief fleet	
B-539	Lions International District 105 SE	1995	Newquay	
B-539	Lions International District 105 SE	1995–1998	Relief fleet	
B-540	Wolverhampton	1978–1990	Abersoch	Sold to ICE-SAR
B-540	Wolverhampton	1990–1996	Relief fleet	Sold to ICE-SAR
B-540	Wolverhampton	1996	Trearddur Bay	Sold to ICE-SAR
B-540	Wolverhampton	1996–2000	Relief/Training fleet	Sold to ICE-SAR
B-541	Elizabeth Bestwick	1976–1988	Relief fleet	
B-541	Elizabeth Bestwick	1988–1991	Falmouth	
B-541	Elizabeth Bestwick	1992–1993	Berwick-upon-Tweed	
B-541	Elizabeth Bestwick	1993–1994	Falmouth	
B-541	Elizabeth Bestwick	1994–1995	Hayling Island	
B-541	Elizabeth Bestwick	1995–1996	Weymouth	
B-541	Elizabeth Bestwick	1996–1997	Relief fleet	
B-542	William Yeo	1976–1987	Relief fleet	
B-542	William Yeo	1987–2003	Inshore Lifeboat Centre	
B-543	Round Table	1978–1990	Helensburgh	
B-543	Round Table	1990–1996	Relief fleet	
B-543	Round Table	1996–1997	Weymouth	
B-543	Round Table	1997–1998	Skerries	
B-543	Round Table	1998–1999	Clovelly	
B-543	Round Table	1999–2001	Relief fleet	
B-544	Catherine Plumbley	1979–1994	Minehead	Sold to ICE-SAR
B-544	Catherine Plumbley	1995	St Bees	Sold to ICE-SAR
B-544	Catherine Plumbley	1995–1996	Relief fleet	Sold to ICE-SAR
B-544	Catherine Plumbley	1996	Weymouth	Sold to ICE-SAR
B-544	Catherine Plumbley	1996–1998	Relief fleet	Sold to ICE-SAR
B-545	Amelia Gregory Armstrong	1980–1995	Silloth	
B-545	Amelia Gregory Armstrong	1995–1998	Relief fleet	
B-546	Independent Forester Benevolence	1980–1997	Lyme Regis	Last reported in private ownership in Portugal
B-546	Independent Forester Benevolence	1997–1998	Relief fleet	Last reported in private ownership in Portugal
B-547	Independent Forester Liberty	1980–1998	Largs	Renamed Káraborg (BB-7482) with ICE-SAR
B-548	Aldershot	1980–1994	Hayling Island	Sold to Finnish Lifeboat Society, later with Muhu Maritime Rescue Society (Muhu, Saaremaa, Estonia)
B-548	Aldershot	1994–1995	Poole	Sold to Finnish Lifeboat Society, later with Muhu Maritime Rescue Society (Muhu, Saaremaa, Estonia)
B-548	Aldershot	1995–1996	Relief fleet	Sold to Finnish Lifeboat Society, later with Muhu Maritime Rescue Society (Muhu, Saaremaa, Estonia)
B-548	Aldershot	1996	Rye Harbour	Sold to Finnish Lifeboat Society, later with Muhu Maritime Rescue Society (Muhu, Saaremaa, Estonia)
B-548	Aldershot	1996–1999	Relief fleet	Sold to Finnish Lifeboat Society, later with Muhu Maritime Rescue Society (Muhu, Saaremaa, Estonia)
B-549	Blenwatch	1981–1996	New Brighton	Sold to ICE-SAR
B-549	Blenwatch	1996	Porthcawl	Sold to ICE-SAR
B-549	Blenwatch	1996–1997	Relief fleet	Sold to ICE-SAR
B-549	Blenwatch	1997–1998	Tighnabruaich	Sold to ICE-SAR
B-549	Blenwatch	1998–2001	Relief fleet	Sold to ICE-SAR
B-549	Blenwatch	2001–2003	Enniskillin (Lower)	Sold to ICE-SAR
B-550	City of Portsmouth	1981–1996	Portsmouth	1998 - Sold to Finnish Lifeboat Society. Later sold to Estonian Maritime Rescue Organization (Tallinna Vabatahtlik Merepääste/Tallinn SAR)
B-550	City of Portsmouth	1996–1998	Relief fleet	1998 - Sold to Finnish Lifeboat Society. Later sold to Estonian Maritime Rescue Organization (Tallinna Vabatahtlik Merepääste/Tallinn SAR)
B-551	Constance Macnay	1981–1997	Queensferry	Sold to Finnish Lifeboat Society
B-551	Constance Macnay	1997–1998	Relief fleet	Sold to Finnish Lifeboat Society
B-551	Constance Macnay	1998–1999	Clifden	Sold to Finnish Lifeboat Society
B-552	Bruinvis	1981–2006	KNRM Ter Heyde	
B-553	Kirklees	1982–1998	Newbiggin	
B-553	Kirklees	1998–1999	Helvick Head	
B-553	Kirklees	1999–2000	Relief fleet	
B-553	Dove	2000–2013	Sandown and Shanklin (Ind.)	
B-553	Dove	2013–	Lagan Search and Rescue	
B-554	American Ambassador	1982–2000	Atlantic College	Last reported in Australia
B-554	American Ambassador	2000–2001	Relief fleet	Last reported in Australia
B-555	Long Life I	1982–1985	Relief fleet	
B-555	Long Life I	1985	Macduff	
B-555	Long Life I	1986	Portaferry	
B-555	Long Life I	1986–1993	Relief fleet	
B-555	Long Life I	1993	Falmouth	
B-555	Long Life I	1993–1995	Relief fleet	
B-555	Long Life I	1995	St Bees	
B-555	Long Life I	1995–1996	Relief fleet	
B-555	Long Life I	1996	Kilrush	
B-556	Spirit of America	1982–1998	Hunstanton	Sold to Finnish Lifeboat Society
B-556	Spirit of America	1998–1999	Relief fleet	Sold to Finnish Lifeboat Society
B-557	Weston Centenary	1983–2001	Weston-super-Mare	Sold to Finnish Lifeboat Society
B-558	Ramsgate Enterprise	1984–2000	Ramsgate	
B-558	Ramsgate Enterprise	2000–2001	Relief fleet	
B-558	St. Brendan	2002–2007	Bantry Inshore Search & Rescue (Ind.)	
B-559	Long Life 3	1984–1999	Aberdovey	Last reported renamed Spirit of Tortola in British Virgin Islands
B-559	Long Life 3	1999–2002	Relief fleet	Last reported renamed Spirit of Tortola in British Virgin Islands
B-560	British Diver	1983–2000	Whitstable	
B-561	Marjorie Turner	1984–2002	Youghal	Sold to Finnish Lifeboat Society
B-562	The Quiver	1985–1998	Southwold	Sold to Finnish Lifeboat Society
B-562	The Quiver	1998–2001	Relief fleet	Sold to Finnish Lifeboat Society
B-563	Blue Peter II	1985–2000	Beaumaris	Sold to Finnish Lifeboat Society
B-563	Unnamed	2000–2002	Relief fleet	Sold to Finnish Lifeboat Society
B-564	Blue Peter I	1985–2001	Littlehampton	
B-564	Unnamed	2001–2003	Relief fleet	
B-565	Manchester and District XXXII	1986–1997	Appledore	
B-565	Manchester and District XXXII	1997–1998	Relief fleet	
B-566	Frank and Mary Atkinson	1986–2002	Lymington	Now named Willemtje with KNRM
B-567	Percy Garon II	1986–2001	Southend-on-Sea	Sold to Chilean Lifeboat Service. In service as 'R-9' with Bote Salvavidas de Iquique, Chile, January 2026.
B-567	Percy Garon II	2001–2002	Relief fleet	Sold to Chilean Lifeboat Service. In service as 'R-9' with Bote Salvavidas de Iquique, Chile, January 2026.
B-567	Percy Garon II	2002	Great Yarmouth and Gorleston	Sold to Chilean Lifeboat Service. In service as 'R-9' with Bote Salvavidas de Iquique, Chile, January 2026.
B-567	Percy Garon II	2002–2004	Relief fleet	Sold to Chilean Lifeboat Service. In service as 'R-9' with Bote Salvavidas de Iquique, Chile, January 2026.
B-568	Burton Brewer	1986–2000	Hartlepool	Last reported with Dorset Police (P-002)
B-568	Burton Brewer	2000–2002	Relief fleet	Last reported with Dorset Police (P-002)
B-568	Burton Brewer	2002	St Abbs	Last reported with Dorset Police (P-002)
B-568	Burton Brewer	2002–2005	Relief fleet	Last reported with Dorset Police (P-002)
B-568	Burton Brewer	2005–2007	Training fleet	Last reported with Dorset Police (P-002)
B-568	Burton Brewer	2008–2010	Hired to Dorset Police (P-002)	Last reported with Dorset Police (P-002)
B-569	Blue Peter V	1986–1994	Portaferry	
B-569	Unnamed	1994–1997	Relief fleet	
B-569	Unnamed	1997–1998	Helvick Head	
B-569	Unnamed	1998–2000	Relief/Training fleet	
B-570	Himley Hall	1987–2001	West Mersea	
B-570	Himley Hall	2001–2005	Relief fleet	
B-571	British Diver II	1987–2002	Harwich	VMR Mornington, Australia, 2008–2016 - Operated by LifeSaving Victoria (Melbourne, Australia); 2016–2021 Operated by VMR Mornington - Volunteer Marine Rescue Inc (Mornington, Australia); 2021–Present, In private ownership (Mornington, Australia)
B-571	British Diver II	2002–2006	Relief fleet	VMR Mornington, Australia, 2008–2016 - Operated by LifeSaving Victoria (Melbourne, Australia); 2016–2021 Operated by VMR Mornington - Volunteer Marine Rescue Inc (Mornington, Australia); 2021–Present, In private ownership (Mornington, Australia)
B-571	British Diver II	2006–2021	Training fleet	VMR Mornington, Australia, 2008–2016 - Operated by LifeSaving Victoria (Melbourne, Australia); 2016–2021 Operated by VMR Mornington - Volunteer Marine Rescue Inc (Mornington, Australia); 2021–Present, In private ownership (Mornington, Australia)
B-572	Dorothy and Katherine Barr	1988–2001	St Abbs	Sold to Chilean Lifeboat Service
B-573	The Lady Dart and Long Life II	1988–2001	Littlestone-on-Sea	Sold to Chilean Lifeboat Service
B-574	Joseph B. Press	1988–2002	Great Yarmouth and Gorleston	
B-574	Joseph B. Press	2002–2007	Relief fleet	
B-574	Joseph B. Press	2007–2008	Training fleet	
B-575	John Batstone	1989–1992	Peel	
B-575	John Batstone	1992–1997	Relief fleet	
B-575	John Batstone	1997–1998	Clifden	
B-575	John Batstone	1998–2000	Relief fleet	
B-575	John Batstone	2000–2002	Crosshaven	
B-575	John Batstone	2002–2005	Relief fleet	
B-576	Ellis Sinclair	1989–2002	Staithes and Runswick	
B-576	Ellis Sinclair	2002–2006	Relief fleet	
B-577	Graham Hillier and Tony Cater	1989–1997	Brighton	Last reported named Ira since 2005, with Nisos Yacht Charter in the Ionian Islands, Greece
B-577	Graham Hillier and Tony Cater	1997–1999	Relief fleet	Last reported named Ira since 2005, with Nisos Yacht Charter in the Ionian Islands, Greece
B-577	Sidmouth Herald	1999–2004	Sidmouth Lifeboat	Last reported named Ira since 2005, with Nisos Yacht Charter in the Ionian Islands, Greece
B-578	The Rotary Club of Glasgow	1989–2006	Macduff	Sold to Dorset Police (P-001). Now in private ownership in the Netherlands, named Anna Jacoba
B-578	The Rotary Club of Glasgow	2006–2008	Training fleet	Sold to Dorset Police (P-001). Now in private ownership in the Netherlands, named Anna Jacoba
B-578	The Rotary Club of Glasgow	2008–2010	Hired to Dorset Police (P-001)	Sold to Dorset Police (P-001). Now in private ownership in the Netherlands, named Anna Jacoba
B-579	Institute of London Underwriters	1989–1997	Clacton-on-Sea	
B-579	Institute of London Underwriters	1997–2001	Relief fleet	
B-579	Institute of London Underwriters	2001–2002	St Abbs	
B-579	Institute of London Underwriters	2002–2003	Relief fleet	
B-580	Leicester Challenge	1990–2001	Redcar	
B-580	Leicester Challenge	2001–2002	Sligo Bay	
B-580	Leicester Challenge	2002	Enniskillin (Upper)	
B-580	Leicester Challenge	2002–2009	Relief fleet	
B-581	Andrew Mason	1990–2002	Helensburgh	
B-581	Andrew Mason	2002–2004	Relief fleet	
B-581	Andrew Mason	2004–2008	Enniskillin (Upper)	
B-582	Borough of Solihull	1990–2002	Abersoch	2008–2011 with Dorset Police (P-003). 2011 - returned to RNLI
B-582	Borough of Solihull	2002–2007	Relief fleet	2008–2011 with Dorset Police (P-003). 2011 - returned to RNLI
B-582	Borough of Solihull	2007–2008	Training fleet	2008–2011 with Dorset Police (P-003). 2011 - returned to RNLI
B-582	Borough of Solihull	2008–2009	Hired to Dorset Police (P-003)	2008–2011 with Dorset Police (P-003). 2011 - returned to RNLI
B-583	Ken Derham	1990–2006	Mudeford	2021, Purchased by Safetyboat Services Ltd for use as a safety / rescue boat
B-583	Ken Derham	2006–2009	Training fleet	2021, Purchased by Safetyboat Services Ltd for use as a safety / rescue boat
B-584	Youth of Ulster	1990–2006	Bangor	
B-585	Peter and Grace Ewing	1991–2006	Kirkcudbright	
B-586	Clothworker	1991–1998	Relief fleet	
B-586	Clothworker	1998–1999	Cardigan	
B-586	Clothworker	1999–2001	Relief fleet	
B-586	Clothworker	2001–2002	Littlehampton	
B-586	Clothworker	2002–2004	Relief fleet	
B-586	Clothworker	2004–2007	Lough Derg	
B-586	Clothworker	2007–2009	Relief fleet	
B-587	Jessie Eliza	1991–2000	St Catherine	
B-588	Frank and Dorothy	1991–2006	Teignmouth	
B-588	Frank and Dorothy	2006–2008	Relief fleet	
B-588	Frank and Dorothy	2008–2009	Storage	
B-589	James Burgess	1992–2006	Walmer	2009 - Sold to Gardline
B-589	James Burgess	2006–2009	Training fleet	2009 - Sold to Gardline
B-590	Wolverson X-Ray	1992–1993	Relief fleet	
B-590	Wolverson X-Ray	1993–1994	Aberystwyth	
B-590	Wolverson X-Ray	1994–1996	Relief fleet	
B-590	Wolverson X-Ray	1996	Kilrush	
B-590	Wolverson X-Ray	1996–1997	Galway	
B-590	Wolverson X-Ray	1997–2002	Relief fleet	
B-590	Wolverson X-Ray	2002	Youghal	
B-590	Wolverson X-Ray	2002–2006	Relief fleet	
B-590	Wolverson X-Ray	2006–2007	Cullercoats	
B-590	Wolverson X-Ray	2007–2009	Training fleet	
B-590	The Dove II	2011–	Sandown and Shanklin (Ind.)	
B-591	Edmund and Joan White	1992–2006	Cullercoats	Sold to ICE-SAR in Eskifjordur
B-591	Edmund and Joan White	2006–2008	Enniskillin (Lower)	Sold to ICE-SAR in Eskifjordur
B-592	Ernest Armstrong	1992–1998	Relief fleet	
B-592	Ernest Armstrong	1998–2001	Arran (Lamlash)	
B-592	Ernest Armstrong	2001–2003	Relief fleet	
B-592	Ernest Armstrong	2003–2006	Enniskillin (Lower)	
B-593	Valerie Hull	1993–2006	Kilkeel	2010–2013 with Oban Sea Cadets. 2013–2021 in private ownership
B-593	John Collins II	2022–	Bonmahon Lifeboat (CRBI)	2010–2013 with Oban Sea Cadets. 2013–2021 in private ownership
B-594	Herbert and Edith	1993–2006	Port Erin	
B-595	Falmouth Round Table	1994–2007	Falmouth	Sold to KNRM
