= Kilkeel Lifeboat Station =

RNLI lifeboat station in County Down, Northern Ireland

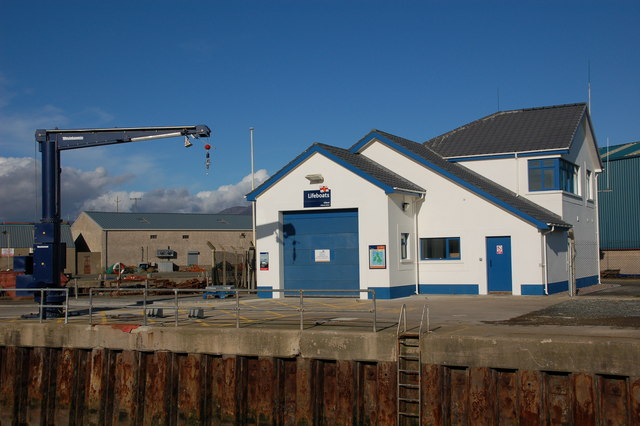
- Kilkeel Lifeboat Station

- Location within Northern Ireland

General information
- Type: RNLI Lifeboat Station
- Location: Harbour Rd, Kilkeel, County Down, BT34 4AX, Northern Ireland
- Coordinates: 54°03′30.7″N 5°59′24.0″W
- Opened: 10 October 1986
- Owner: Royal National Lifeboat Institution

Website
- Kilkeel RNLI Lifeboat Station

Kilkeel Lifeboat Station sits on the northern side of the harbour at Kilkeel, a town approximately 18 miles (29 km) south-east of Newry, home to the largest fishing fleet in Northern Ireland, located on the south-east coast of County Down, Northern Ireland.

A lifeboat was first stationed at Kilkeel on 10 October 1986 by the Royal National Lifeboat Institution (RNLI).

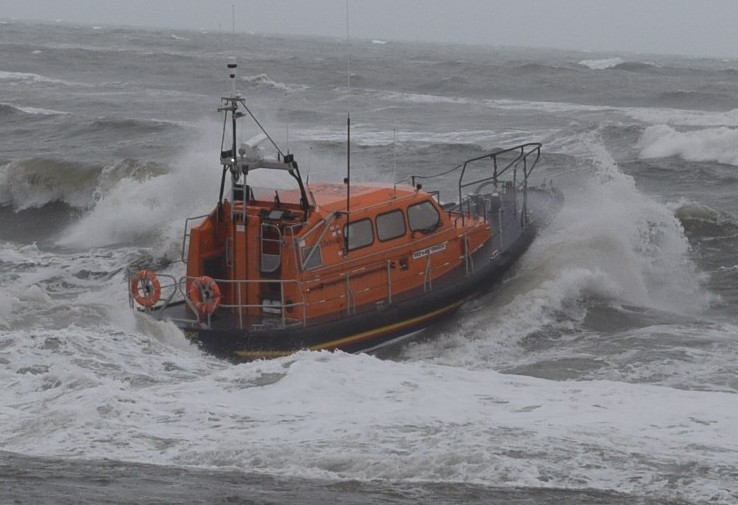
Shannon-class All-weather lifeboat 13-57 Bobby Cameron (ON 1364)

The station currently operates the Shannon-class All-weather lifeboat, 13-57 Bobby Cameron (ON 1364), on station since 2026.

== History ==
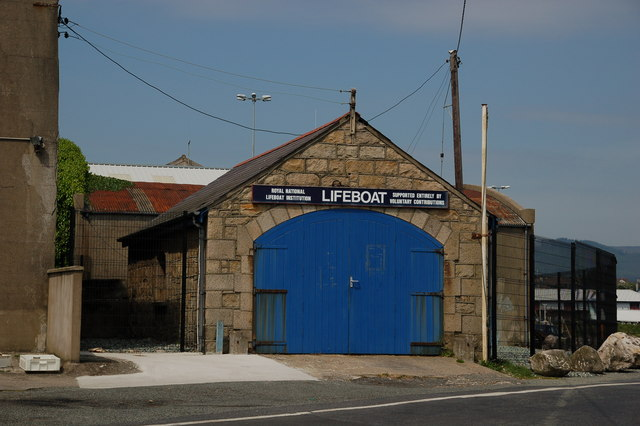
Old boathouse

After a summer of extensive training with a 16-foot D-class (Zodiac III) Inshore lifeboat, (D-241), the new RNLI lifeboat station at Kilkeel was declared operational on 10 October 1986, and a D-class (RFD PB16) (D-308) was placed on station. An old boathouse on the southern quay, built for Francis Needham, 3rd Earl of Kilmorey in the 1800s, was put into use as the RNLI boathouse.

Initially operating during the summer months for the holiday season, it quickly became clear that the small D-class wasn't suited to the tasks required, especially being based in the most active fishing harbour in Northern Ireland. At a meeting of the committee of management in June 1990, it was decided to withdraw the D-class, and place a B-class (Atlantic 21) at the station.

Work began in 1992, on the construction of a new boathouse, on the northern side of the Kilkeel river, to house the much larger Atlantic-class lifeboat. With no slipway possible, a new Schat davit was constructed on the quay in July, used to lower the lifeboat into the water. On 21 September, the Atlantic 21-class (B-533) from the relief fleet was sent to the station for training, and in November, the boathouse with modern crew facilities and a workshop was completed, and the D-class lifeboat was withdrawn.

A dual ceremony was held on 8 May 1993. First, Cecil Baxter, president of the branch, declared the boathouse officially open. A new B-class (Atlantic 21), one of the last three to be manufactured, arrived on station, funded by the legacy of Mrs Margaret Campbell Hull. Her nephew Derek Hull then handed the lifeboat to the care of Robert Grimason, Honorary Secretary for Kilkeel lifeboat station, and after a service of dedication, Wendy Austin of BBC Northern Ireland named the lifeboat Valerie Hull (B-593).

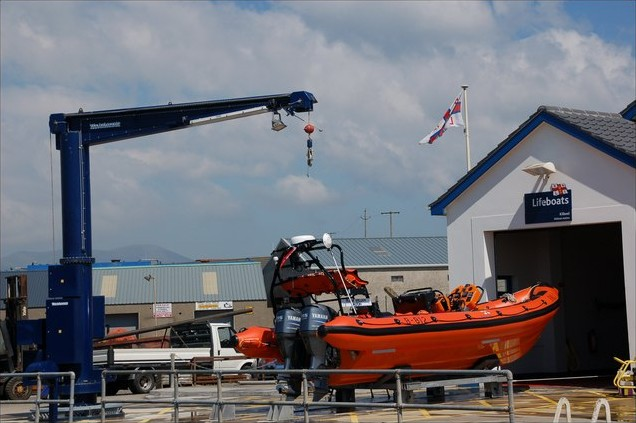
Kilkeel B-class (Atlantic 85) lifeboat and davit hoist

In 2006, works costing £212,862 were carried out to the boathouse and the davit, to accommodate a newer larger boat. Kilkeel would receive their new B-class (Atlantic 85) on Tuesday 28 November 2006.

At a ceremony held in September 2007, the new £130,000 lifeboat was named Frank William Walton (B-812), following the bequest received from the late RNLI Life Governor. Between 1986, when Kilkeel lifeboat station was established, and 2006, the lifeboat had been launched 305 times, and rescued 187 people.

On 9 April 2025, it was announced that a new Shannon-class All-weather lifeboat, to cover the southern County Down coast, was to be placed at Kilkeel by the end of 2025, replacing their existing davit-launched B-class (Atlantic 85) Inshore lifeboat. New B-class (Atlantic 85) and D-class (IB1) Inshore lifeboats would replace the 34-year-old Mersey-class All-weather lifeboat at the flanking station of Newcastle, which was due for retirement.

A new Shannon-class lifeboat arrived at Kilkeel on Wednesday 17 December, following her passage from RNLI headquarters in Poole. The lifeboat was primarily funded by Margaret Cameron, in memory of her late brother Bobby, and the donor was welcomed on a visit to the station the following day.

After a period of training, the new lifeboat was formally declared a search and rescue asset by Belfast Coastguard, at 19:00 on Friday 5 June 2026. At a ceremony held on Saturday 22 August 2026, in the 40th anniversary year of the Kilkeel station, Margaret Cameron formally handed the lifeboat to the RNLI, accepted by chief executive Peter Sparkes, who then handed the lifeboat to the care of John Fisher, Lifeboat Operations Manager, and the Kilkeel branch. A service of dedication was led by the Rev Rodney Cameron, nephew of Margaret and Bobby Cameron. Margaret Cameron then named the lifeboat 13-57 Bobby Cameron (ON 1364).

Further funding for the lifeboat, which cost in excess of £2.5m, was received from the bequests from Edna Joyce Burgess and Hazel Mills, lifelong supporters of the RNLI. The boat is also one of two Legacy lifeboats, which carry names of those people who pledged a gift to the Institution in a Will, within the numbers on the boat.

== Station honours ==
The following are awards made at Kilkeel, Co. Down:

- Member, Order of the British Empire (MBE)

Merwyn Chambers Hanna, president of Kilkeel lifeboat station – 2005NYH

== Kilkeel lifeboats ==
=== D class lifeboats ===
Op.No. (Note: Op. No. is the RNLI's Operational Number of the boat carried on the hull.)	Name	On station	Class	Comments
D-241	Unnamed	1986	D-class (Zodiac III)	
D-308	Unnamed	1986–1992	D-class (RFD PB16)	

=== B class lifeboats ===
Op.No.	Name	On station	Class	Comments
B-533	Unnamed	1992–1993	B-class (Atlantic 21)	
B-525	Spix's Macaw	1993	B-class (Atlantic 21)	
B-593	Valerie Hull	1993–2006	B-class (Atlantic 21)	
B-812	Frank William Walton	2006–2026	B-class (Atlantic 85)	

Inshore lifeboat withdrawn in 2026.

=== All-weather lifeboats ===
ON (Note: ON is the RNLI's Official Number of the boat.)	Op.No.	Name	Built	On station	Class	Comments
1364	13-57	Bobby Cameron	2025	2026–	Shannon	

== See also ==
- List of RNLI stations
- List of former RNLI stations
- Royal National Lifeboat Institution lifeboats
