= Enniskillen Lifeboat Station =

RNLI lifeboat station in County Fermanagh, Northern Ireland

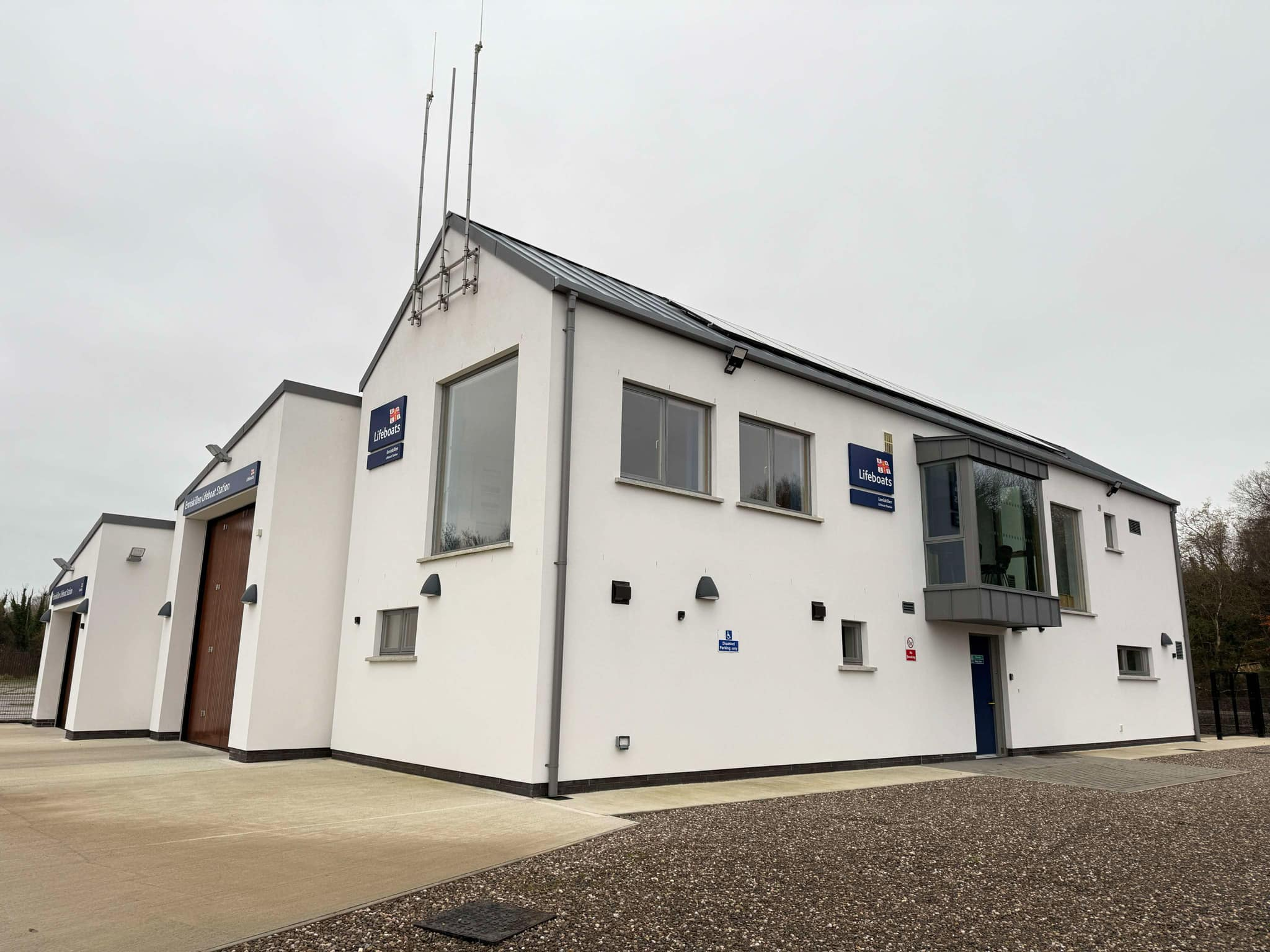
- Enniskillen Lifeboat Station

- Location within Northern Ireland
- Former names: Enniskillen (Lower) Lifeboat Station

General information
- Type: RNLI Lifeboat Station
- Location: 172 Killadeas Road, Gublusk, Ballinamallard, County Fermanagh, BT94 2LW, Northern Ireland
- Coordinates: 54°25′16.6″N 7°40′36.3″W
- Opened: 24 May 2001
- Owner: Royal National Lifeboat Institution

Website
- Enniskillen RNLI Lifeboat Station

Enniskillen Lifeboat Station is located on the south eastern shore of lower Lough Erne, approximately 6 miles (9.7 km) north of the town of Enniskillen, in County Fermanagh, Northern Ireland.

Originally named Enniskillen (Lower) Lifeboat Station, it was established on 24 May 2001 by the Royal National Lifeboat Institution (RNLI). It was renamed Enniskillen Lifeboat Station in 2017.

The station currently operates the B-class (Atlantic 85) Inshore lifeboat, John and Jean Lewis (B-912), on station since 2018.

== History ==
The town of Enniskillen sits on the short stretch of the River Erne between the two lakes collectively known as Lough Erne, in County Fermanagh, Northern Ireland. The smaller southern lake is called the Upper Lough, and the bigger northern lake is called the Lower or Broad Lough. The water then flows out to the Atlantic Ocean. The lough has more than 150 islands, and covers over 50 sq mi (130 km^{2}). Previously rescue work on the lough had been covered by the Royal Ulster Constabulary. Later, a charitable trust had been set up, and "Lough Erne Rescue" was formed.

The RNLI took over operations, and established Enniskillen (Lower) Lifeboat Station as the 40th RNLI lifeboat station in Ireland, initially on a one-year evaluation period. It would be the RNLI's first Inland Lifeboat Station. Eighteen volunteers initially received training, eight on the helmsman courses at Cowes, and others in VHF radio, mechanics, and administration, courses held at the RNLI HQ in Poole. The station was established at Lough Erne Yacht Club, operating out of three portakabins, with the placement of two lifeboats, a B-class (Atlantic 21), Blenwatch (B-549), and a smaller unnamed E-class Valiant RIB. When the Coastguard took over responsibility for search and rescue on Lough Erne from the police, the station was declared operational on 24 May 2001.

On the Sunday before the official opening, the RNLI lifeboat took part in a search for a missing German tourist whose boat had run aground in Lower Lough Erne. A second man also died, after their cruiser ran aground on Cleenishgarve Island near Castle Archdale on Lower Lough Erne. On this occasion, nothing could have been done to save them, but it highlighted the necessity for a lifeboat in the area.

Between May and October 2001, the lifeboat was called out 16 times. The one-year evaluation proved one major point, in that cover was inadequate to cover both lakes. Lower Lough Erne is 20 miles long by 10 miles wide at the widest part, and Upper Lough Erne is 10 miles long by 6 miles wide. It is estimated that there are over 2000 craft on the water during the year. Between 1990 and 1999, there was an average of two lives lost each year.

A second station was established at Carrybridge, then known as "Enniskillen (Upper) Lifeboat Station", becoming operational from dawn on Friday 1 June 2002.

For further information for Enniskillen (Upper) Lifeboat Station, please see

- Carrybridge Lifeboat Station

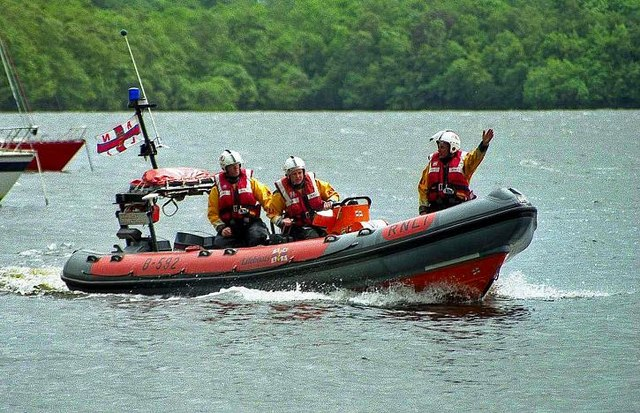
Enniskillen (Lower) Atlantic 21-class Ernest Armstrong (B-592)

In 2008, the last two Atlantic 21-class lifeboats still on operational service, Edmund and Joan White (B-591) at Enniskillen (Upper), and Andrew Mason (B-581) at Enniskillen (Lower), were finally retired. The Enniskillen stations would receive the second and third operational Atlantic 75-class lifeboats, Manchester Unity of Oddfellows (B-702) to Enniskillen (Upper), and Jason Logg (B-703) to Enniskillen (Upper). Both lifeboats were already 14 years old by the time they arrived in Northern Ireland.

A Jetski, known in the RNLI as a Rescue Water Craft, RWC52, was also placed at the station in 2009, operating until 2022.

In 2017, Enniskillen (Lower) Lifeboat Station would officially change its name to Enniskillen Lifeboat Station. At the same time, Enniskillen (Upper) Lifeboat Station became Carrybridge Lifeboat Station.

After operating a succession of six older Atlantic-class lifeboats over a period of just 17 years, the station would finally receive a new one. The B-class (Atlantic 85) lifeboat John and Jean Lewis (B-912) arrived on station in 2018. John Arthur Lewis (1922 – 2013) was both a model yacht and full-size sailing yacht designer, with a career spanning 81 years. He went on to publish two books of designs. John’s lifelong interest in sailing was shared by his devoted wife, Jean, and it was their joint decision that the RNLI receive a legacy to finance a lifeboat.

After 21 years operating out of temporary accommodation, a new purpose built station was constructed by Omagh-based company Woodvale Construction, on the shore at Killadeas Road in Gublusk, and was handed over to the station volunteers in November 2022. Along with housing both lifeboat, carriage and launch tractor, there are modern crew facilities, a workshop, office and training room. Solar panels are fitted to the roof, with ground source heating helping to reduce energy usage. Contribution to the construction was received from the family of the late Alfred Russell Wallace Weir from Bangor, County Down, in his memory.

The new boathouse was officially opened at a joint ceremony on Saturday 1 July 2023, along with the official naming of the B-class (Atlantic 85) John and Jean Lewis (B-912), which had been delayed by the COVID-19 pandemic, and then held until the boathouse was completed. In probably one of the longest gaps between a lifeboat arriving on station and being officially named, during that time, the lifeboat had been launched 97 times, and brought 205 people to safety.

== Enniskillen lifeboats ==
Op. No. (Note: Op. No. is the RNLI's Operational Number of the boat carried on the hull.)	Name	On Station	Class	Comments
B-549	Blenwatch	2001–2003	B-class (Atlantic 21)	
E-01	Unnamed	2001–2003	E-class Valiant RIB	
B-592	Ernest Armstrong	2003–2006	B-class (Atlantic 21)	
B-591	Edmund and Joan White	2006–2008	B-class (Atlantic 21)	
B-702	Manchester Unity of Oddfellows	2007–2012	B-class (Atlantic 75)	
B-792	Joseph and Mary Hiley	2012–2018	B-class (Atlantic 75)	
B-912	John and Jean Lewis	2018–	B-class (Atlantic 85)	

=== Launch and recovery tractors ===
Op. No.	Reg. No.	Type	On Station	Comments
TA36	TBZ 3520	New Holland 1920	2001–2002	
TA52	DJZ 503S	New Holland TN55D	2002–2008	
TA48	BJZ 8420	New Holland TN55D	2008–2020	
TA46	BJZ 8419	New Holland TN55D	2020–2021	
TA133	WJ70 MKE	New Holland TD5.95	2021–	

== See also ==
- List of RNLI stations
- List of former RNLI stations
- Royal National Lifeboat Institution lifeboats
