= Carrybridge Lifeboat Station =

RNLI lifeboat station in County Fermanagh, Northern Ireland

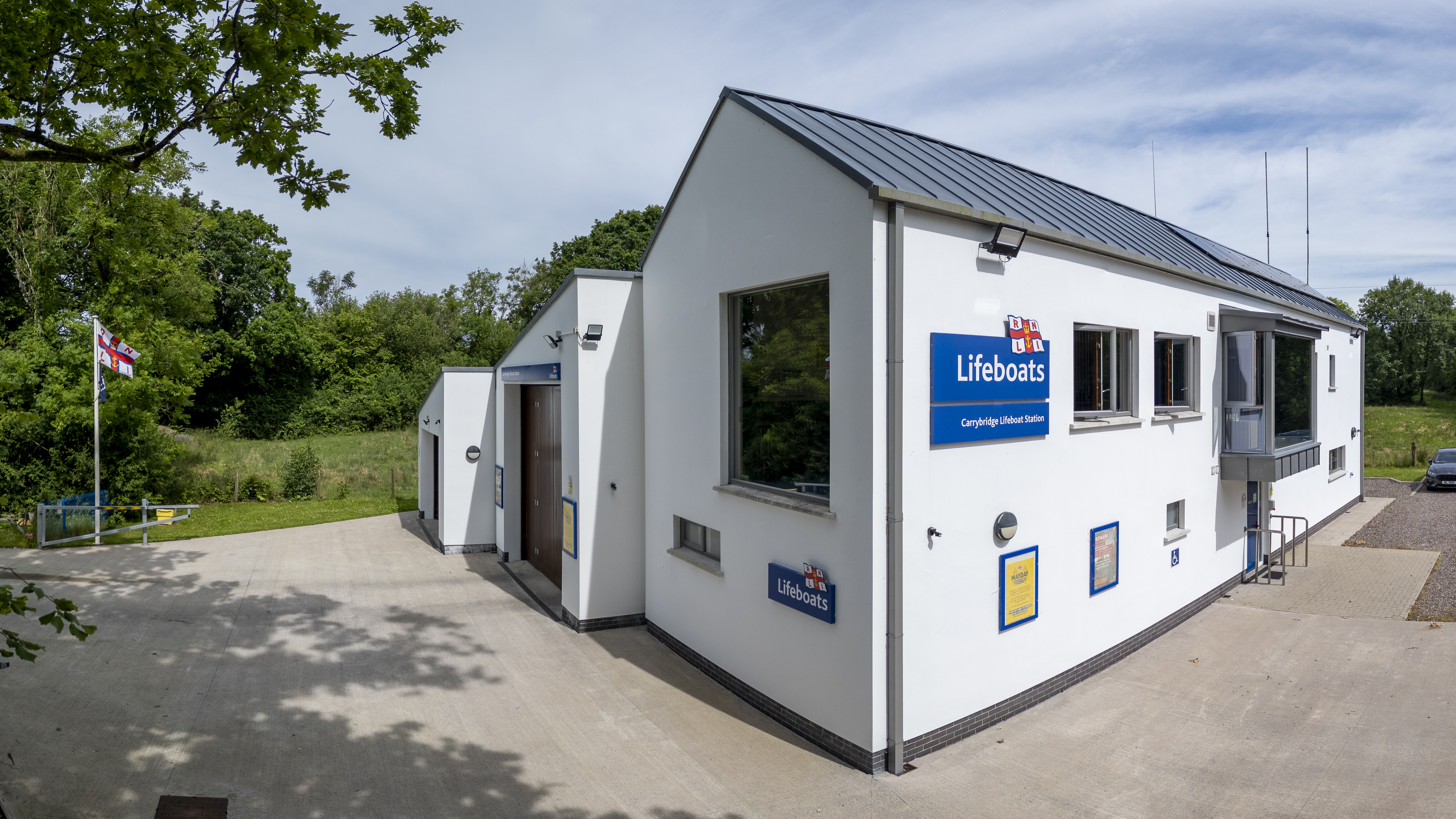
- Carrybridge Lifeboat Station

- Location within Northern Ireland
- Former names: Enniskillen (Upper) Lifeboat Station

General information
- Type: RNLI Lifeboat Station
- Location: 23 Inishmore Road, Gola, Lisbellaw, County Fermanagh, BT94 5DQ, Northern Ireland
- Coordinates: 54°17′15.1″N 7°32′54.2″W
- Opened: 1 June 2002
- Owner: Royal National Lifeboat Institution

Website
- Carrybridge RNLI Lifeboat Station

Carrybridge Lifeboat Station is located on the eastern shore of the River Erne, at Carrybridge, a small village approximately 6 miles (9.7 km) south east of the town of Enniskillen, in County Fermanagh, Northern Ireland.

Originally named Enniskillen (Upper) Lifeboat Station, it was established on 3 July 2002 by the Royal National Lifeboat Institution (RNLI). It was renamed Carrybridge Lifeboat Station in 2017.

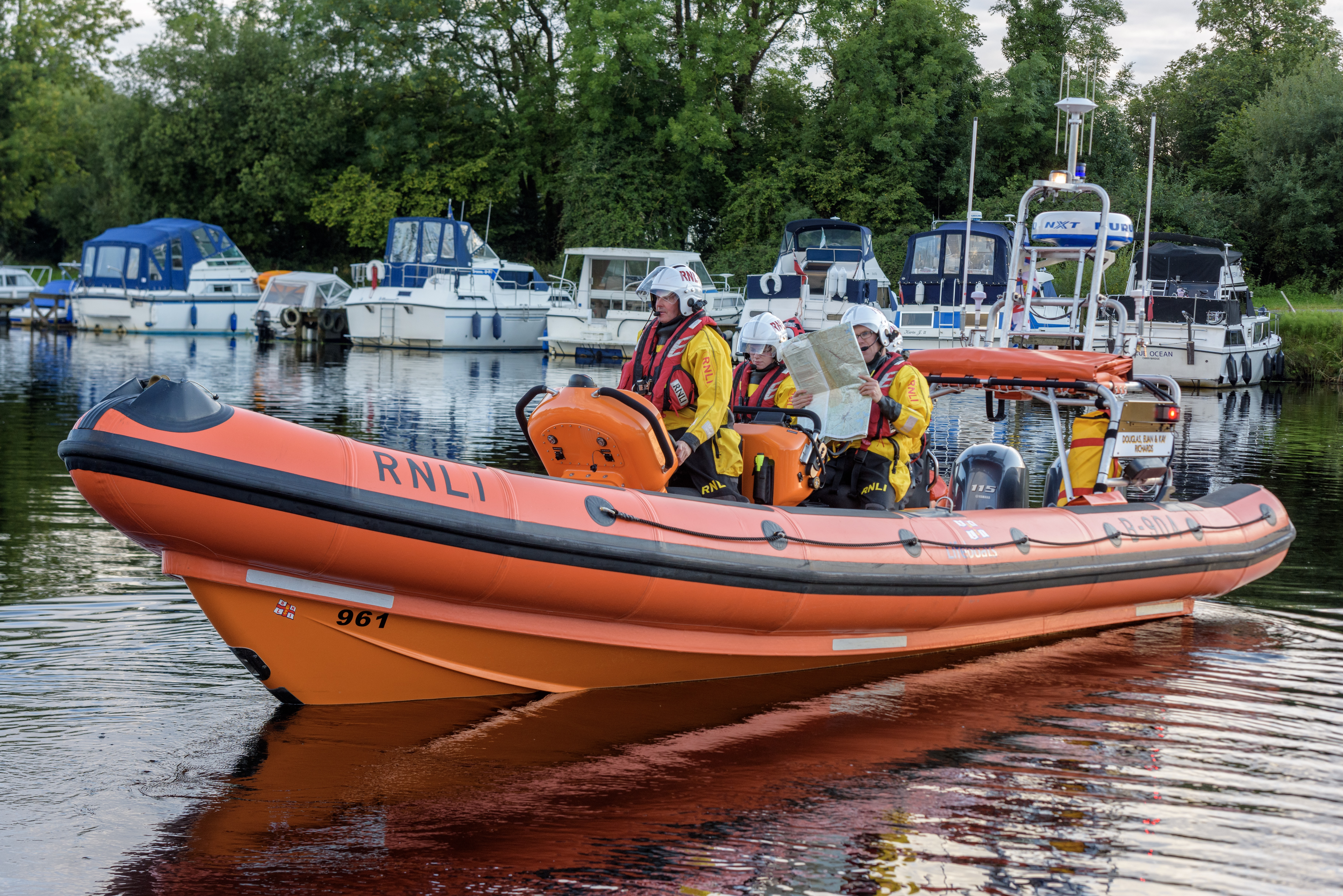
B-class (Atlantic 85) Douglas Euan & Kay Richards (B-904)

The station currently operates the B-class (Atlantic 85) Inshore lifeboat, Douglas, Euan & Kay Richards (B-904), on station since 2017.

== History ==
The town of Enniskillen sits on the short stretch of the River Erne between the two lakes collectively known as Lough Erne, in County Fermanagh, Northern Ireland. The smaller southern lake is called the Upper Lough, and the bigger northern lake is called the Lower or Broad Lough. The water then flows out to the Atlantic Ocean. The lough has more than 150 islands, and covers over 50 sq mi (130 km^{2}). Previously rescue work on the lough had been covered by the Royal Ulster Constabulary. Later, a charitable trust had been set up, and Lough Erne Rescue was formed.

On 24 May 2001, the RNLI established their first inland lifeboat station at Enniskillen, taking over from Lough Erne Rescue. Enniskillen (Lower) Lifeboat Station would be the 40th RNLI lifeboat station in Ireland.

For further information for Enniskillen (Lower) Lifeboat Station, please see

- Enniskillen Lifeboat Station

Between May and October 2001, the Enniskillen (Lower) lifeboat was called out 16 times. The one-year evaluation proved one major point, in that cover was inadequate for both lakes. Lower Lough Erne is 20 miles long by 10 miles wide at the widest part, and Upper Lough Erne is 10 miles long by 6 miles wide. It is estimated that there are over 2000 craft on the water during the year. Between 1990 and 1999, there was an average of two lives lost each year.

A second station was established at Carrybridge, then to be known as Enniskillen (Upper) Lifeboat Station, becoming operational from dawn on Friday 1 June 2002.

In 2008, the last two Atlantic 21-class lifeboats still on operational service, Edmund and Joan White (B-591) at Enniskillen (Upper), and Andrew Mason (B-581) at Enniskillen (Lower) stations, were finally retired. The Enniskillen stations would then receive the second and third operational Atlantic 75-class lifeboats, Manchester Unity of Oddfellows (B-702) to Enniskillen (Upper), and Jason Logg (B-703) to Enniskillen (Upper). Both lifeboats were already 14 years old by the time they arrived in Northern Ireland.

Two Jetski, known in the RNLI as a Rescue Water Craft, (RWC-053) and (RWC-054), were also placed at the station in 2009, operating until 2022.

In 2014, 12 years after operations commenced at Carrybridge, and continued in temporary buildings, construction of a new station building was started, and would be the first specially built inland RNLI station building. The work was carried out by Omagh-based Woodvale Construction, and £60,000 was raised by the local community towards the cost. The building was completed and operational by March 2015. At a ceremony on 14 October 2015, the station was formally opened by H.R.H. Prince Edward, Duke of Kent, President of the RNLI, and handed over to Tom Bailey, Lifeboat Operations Manager at Carrybridge, who accepted the new building on behalf of Enniskillen RNLI.

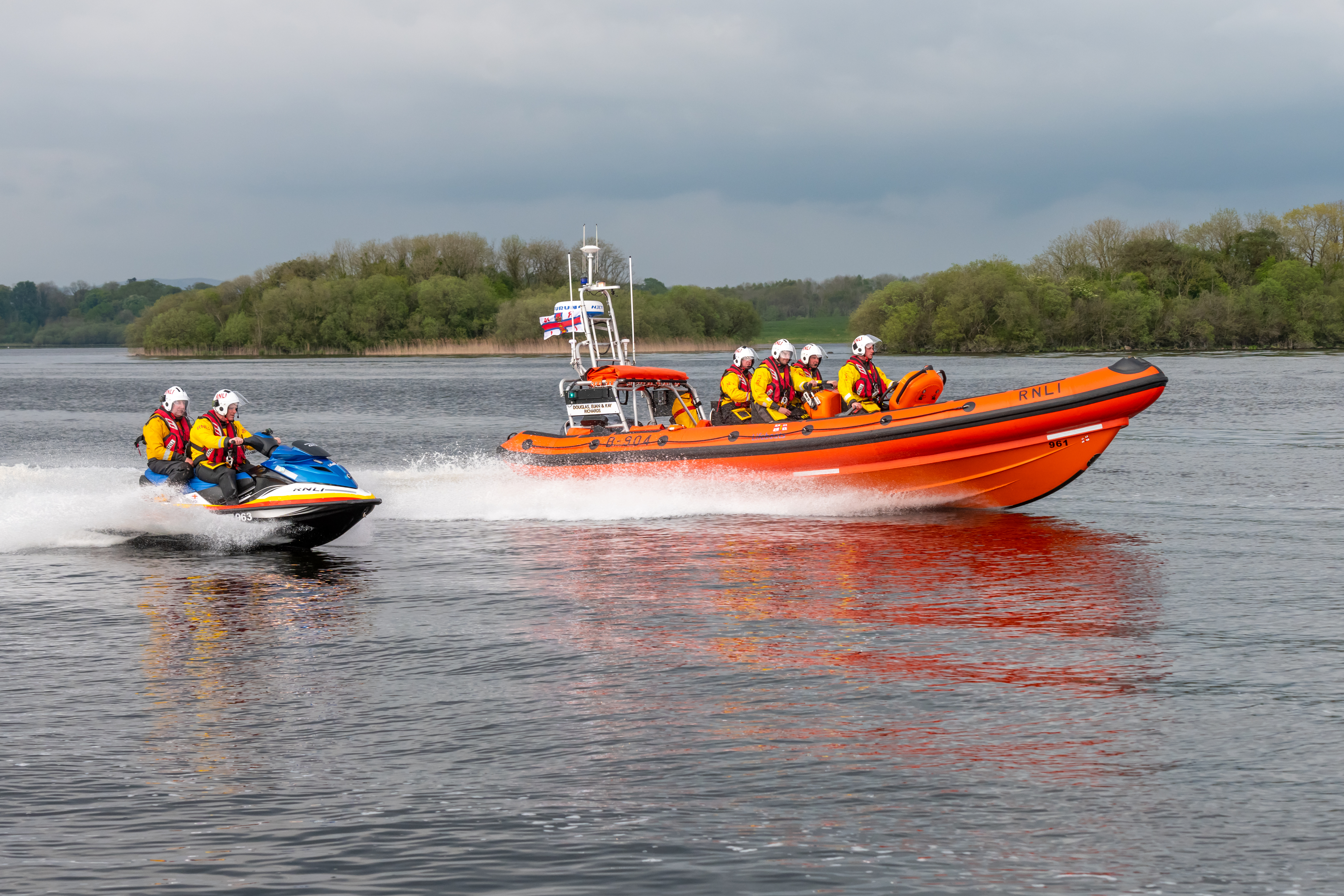
Carrybridge B-class (Atlantic 85) Douglas, Euan & Kay Richards and Rescue Water Craft RWC-053

In 2017, Enniskillen (Upper) Lifeboat Station would officially change its name to Carrybridge Lifeboat Station. At the same time, Enniskillen (Lower) Lifeboat Station was renamed Enniskillen Lifeboat Station.

After operating a succession of six older Atlantic-class lifeboats over a period of just 15 years, the station would finally receive a new one, funded by the John and Elizabeth Allan Memorial Trust, a charitable organisation set up by their son Dr Patrick Allan.

The B-class (Atlantic 85) lifeboat arrived on station in 2017. At a naming ceremony and service of dedication, the lifeboat was named after his three children, Douglas, Euan & Kay Richards (B-904).

== Carrybridge lifeboats ==
Op. No. (Note: Op. No. is the RNLI's Operational Number of the boat carried on the hull.)	Name	On Station	Class	Comments
B-580	Leicester Challenge	2002	B-class (Atlantic 21)	
B-525	Spix's Macaw	2002–2004	B-class (Atlantic 21)	
B-581	Andrew Mason	2004–2008	B-class (Atlantic 21)	
B-703	Jason Logg	2008–2013	B-class (Atlantic 75)	
B-751	Benjamin Dowing Fairbridge	2013–2015	B-class (Atlantic 75)	
B-773	Duckhams 2001	2015–2017	B-class (Atlantic 75)	
B-904	Douglas, Euan & Kay Richards	2017–	B-class (Atlantic 85)	

=== Launch and recovery tractors ===
Op. No.	Reg. No.	Type	On Station	Comments
TA36	TBZ 3520	New Holland 1920	2002–2010	
TA46	BJZ 8419	New Holland TN55D	2010–2020	
TA132	WA69 BWZ	New Holland TD5.95	2020–	

== See also ==
- List of RNLI stations
- List of former RNLI stations
- Royal National Lifeboat Institution lifeboats
