= Atlantic College Lifeboat Station =

Former lifeboat station in South Wales

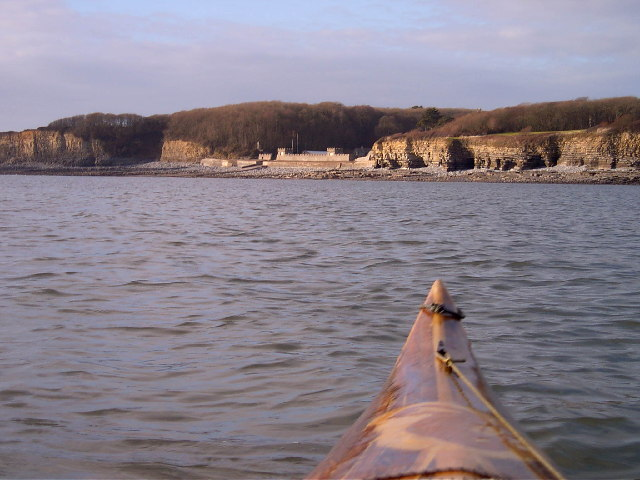
- Atlantic College Lifeboat Station

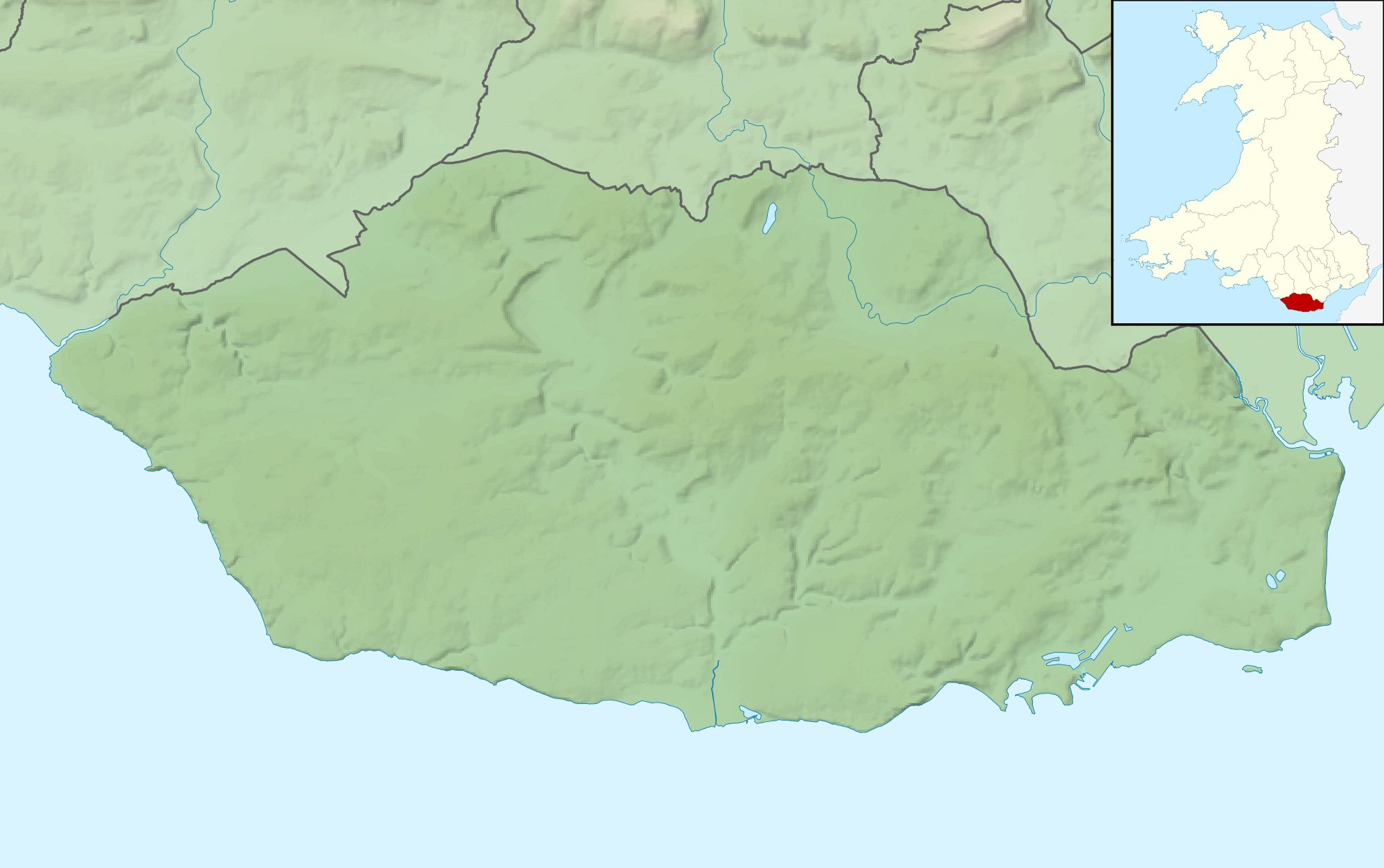
- Location within Vale of Glamorgan

General information
- Status: Closed
- Type: RNLI Lifeboat Station
- Location: St Donat's Castle, St Donats, Llantwit Major, CF61 1WF, Wales
- Coordinates: 51°24′5″N 3°31′57″W
- Opened: 1963
- Closed: 2013

Atlantic College Lifeboat Station was an inshore lifeboat station based at Atlantic College, which is located on the Bristol Channel coast of South Wales, at St Donats, near Llantwit Major.

The station opened in 1963, shortly after the school had been launched the previous autumn, as one of the first nine experimental inshore lifeboat stations established by the Royal National Lifeboat Institution (RNLI). The station pioneered innovative boatbuilding techniques, including inventing the Rigid Inflatable Boat (RIB) and creating the prototype for the Atlantic 21-class lifeboat in the early 1970s.

The RNLI withdrew the lifeboat from Atlantic College in June 2013.

== History ==
=== B-class development ===
Atlantic College was instrumental in the design and development of the RNLI's first fast rescue boats under the supervision of the founding headmaster, Rear Admiral Desmond Hoare. He was the pioneer of the revolutionary Rigid Inflatable Boat (RIB) and of the prototype for the eventual B-class (Atlantic 21) lifeboat, which was named after the college and entered service in the early 1970s.

Rescue boats at the Atlantic College Lifeboat Station at the St Donats seafront in 1966, with St Donat's castle in the background.

In the early 1960s, the college began designing, building and experimenting with the operation of a series of rigid inflatable boat, one of which eventually became the basis for the B-class. The chief innovation was the design, construction and testing of a rigid hull attached to inflatable tubes, for previously the inflatable boat bottoms were made of flexible, rubberized fabric that was kept taut under load through the use of collapsible inboard floorboards that formed the boat’s deck. This notable and novel innovation was in response to the rough seas, breaking surf and rocky shore conditions at the college’s St Donats Bay seafront access, where school rescue craft had to be launched, operated and recovered.

The college sold the RIB patent to the RNLI for a symbolic £1 in 1973. An early example of the model was discovered in Barry in 2012, and restored in 2014.

=== First female crew member ===
Norwegian college student Elisabeth Hostvedt became the first RNLI registered female lifeboat crew member, joining the crew in 1969, but it was 2 years later on 20 May 1971, when a second female student, Penelope M. Sutton, recorded the first service at any RNLI station involving a registered female crew member. The ILB was launched to investigate a Swedish motor cruiser, reported to be at anchor and flying a distress signal, but the incident was a false alarm, as the courtesy Red Ensign flown on the cruiser had been misinterpreted.

=== RNLI lifeboat station ===
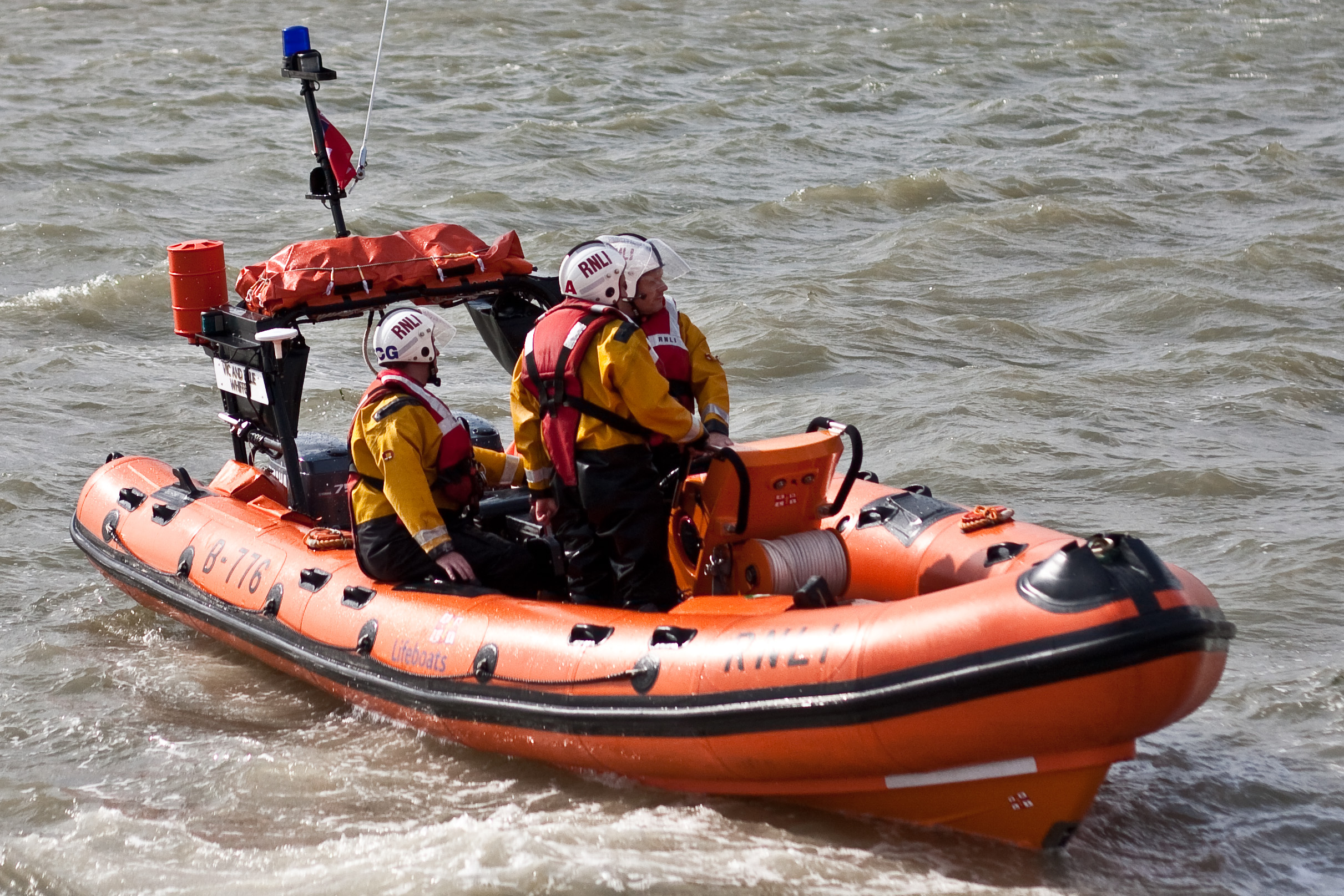
An Atlantic 75 Lifeboat, of the same type that was deployed at the college from 2000-2013.

In 1973, the station received its first standardized RNLI Atlantic 21 lifeboat. Previous lifeboats operated by the station were owned by the college with the RNLI paying for the operating expenses.

In 2000, the station received a slightly longer and larger Atlantic 75-class lifeboat at roughly 24 feet in length. The RNLI withdrew their standardized lifeboat in June 2013. Helmsman training time had increased from one to two years, so it became no longer practical to train students as helms during the two year College (International Baccalaureate Diploma) program (two years of study).

=== Heritage Continues ===
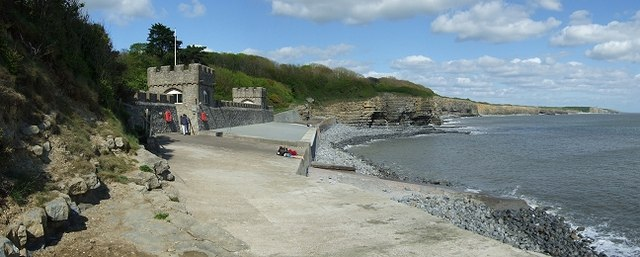
St Donat's Bay

The college continues to be involved in boatbuilding. Following the withdrawal of RNLI in the mid-2010s, Atlantic College alumnus and RNLI crew member Robin Jenkins founded Atlantic Pacific International Rescue Limited. The registered charity continued to offer SAR and boat-building trainings for Atlantic College students.

In 2015, Atlantic Pacific and Atlantic College joined a number of other organisations to campaign for the establishment of a lifeboat service in Japan. Innovation continues with the introduction of a 4.3 metre RHIB powered by a 40 hp / 30 kw outboard engine with propeller guard that can fit into a standard shipping container for shipment over to Kamaishi, Iwate in northeastern Japan, where the container serves as a mobile lifeboat station (equipped with crew change area, tools and maintenance mini-bay and boat storage on a launching dolly.)

Atlantic Pacific continues to works with Atlantic College students to build these Hahn class rigid hull inflatable boats for humanitarian relief purposes. An example is a rescue boat that was transported to Lesvos Greece under the logistical efforts of AC alumnus Richard Chamberlain, for ongoing use in supporting the migrant refugee crisis by volunteers.

== Station honours ==
The following are awards made at Atlantic College.

- Letter of Appreciation from the Secretary of the Institution,
  to the crew of IRB X7, in recognition of their services on 11 November, when four men were rescued from the wreck of the dredger Steepholm.

Goetz Unger – 1968
Willem de Vogel – 1968
Pelham Allen – 1968

== Atlantic College lifeboats ==
Op. No. (Note: Op. No. is the RNLI's Operational Number of the boat carried on the hull.)	Name	On station	Class	Comments
D-33	Unnamed	1965–1966	D-class (RFD PB16)	
D-38	Unnamed	1965–1966	D-class (RFD PB16)	
D-29	Unnamed	1966	D-class (RFD PB16)	
B-3	Unnamed	1970–1971	B-class (Atlantic 17)	Formerly numbered C-1
B-508	Unnamed	1973–1980	B-class (Atlantic 21)	
B-505	Major Osman Gabriel	1980–1981	B-class (Atlantic 21)	
B-554	American Ambassador	1982–2000	B-class (Atlantic 21)	
B-763	Colin James Daniel	2000–2013	B-class (Atlantic 75)	

== See also ==
- List of RNLI stations
- List of former RNLI stations
- Royal National Lifeboat Institution lifeboats
