= Queensferry Lifeboat Station =

RNLI lifeboat station in East Lothian, Scotland

- Queensferry Lifeboat Station in 2024

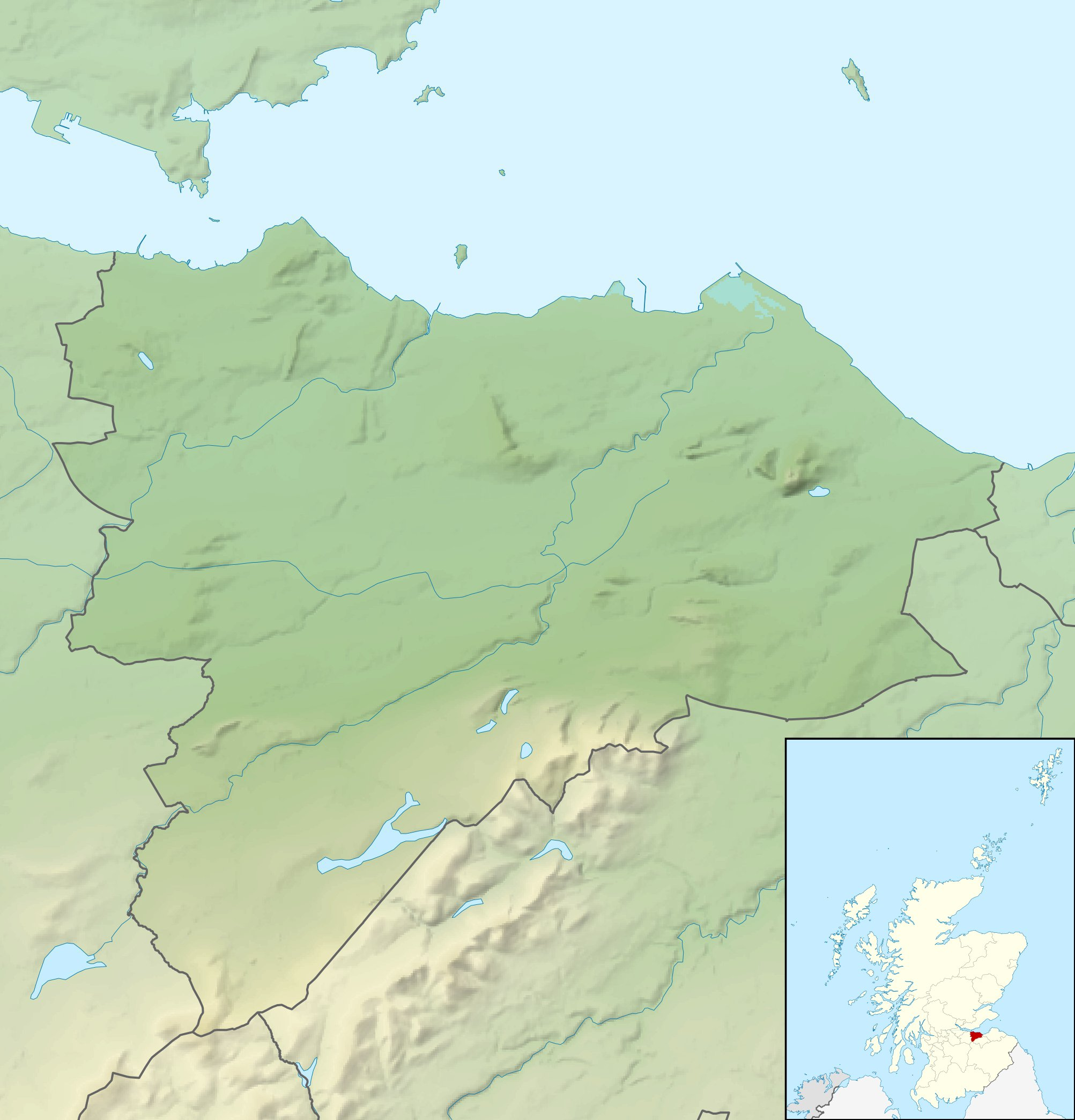
- Location within the City of Edinburgh council area
- Former names: South Queensferry Lifeboat Station

General information
- Type: RNLI Lifeboat Station
- Location: Hawes Pier, Newhalls Road, South Queensferry, Edinburgh, EH30 9TB, Scotland
- Coordinates: 55°59′27.4″N 03°23′7.9″W
- Opened: July 1967
- Owner: Royal National Lifeboat Institution

Website
- Queensferry RNLI Lifeboat Station

Queensferry Lifeboat Station can be found on Hawes Pier, sitting in the shadow of the Forth Rail Bridge, in South Queensferry, a town and former Royal Burgh on the south shore of the River Forth estuary, within the boundary of the city of Edinburgh, historically West Lothian, in north-east Scotland.

A lifeboat station was established at South Queensferry by the Royal National Lifeboat Institution (RNLI) in 1967.

The station currently operates a B-class (Atlantic 85) Inshore lifeboat, Jimmy Cairncross (B-851), on station since 6 September 2012.

== History ==
In 1964, in response to an increasing amount of water-based leisure activity, the RNLI placed 25 small fast Inshore lifeboats around the country. These were easily launched with just a few people, ideal to respond quickly to local emergencies.

More stations were opened, and in July 1967, the RNLI established South Queensferry Lifeboat Station, and a D-class (RFD PB16) Inshore lifeboat, the unnamed (D-145), was placed on service. The boathouse at Hawes Pier was previously the booking office for the North and South Queensferry ferry boats.

At the request of the branch, the station was renamed Queensferry Lifeboat Station in 1969.

In 1972, the D-class lifeboat was withdrawn, and replaced with the larger and faster twin-engined B-class (Atlantic 21) RIB Major Osman Gabriel (B-505).

At 17:00 on 8 December 1974, the Queensferry lifeboat Major Osman Gabriel (B-505) was launched in cold dark conditions, and force 6–7 winds, to reports of a man in a small dinghy in difficult off Inchcolm island. Nearing the island, a large wave shorted out the radio and navigation lights. Firing a flare, the man was spotted on Swallow Craig rock. He had set out in his dinghy to attend to his boat, when he lost an oar. Bringing the lifeboat in as close as possible, the remaining two crew went ashore, and pulled the man's dinghy above the high water mark. The man was landed at Inchcolm at 17:40, the lifeboat returning to station at 18:45, For this service, Helm Ranald Mackay and his two crew were each presented with "A Framed Letter of Thanks, signed by the Chairman of the Institution".

A new boathouse and station facilities were constructed and opened in 1989, and a boathouse extension was completed in 1998.

Queensferry was the busiest lifeboat station in Scotland in 2010, launching 74 times, and rescuing 138 people.

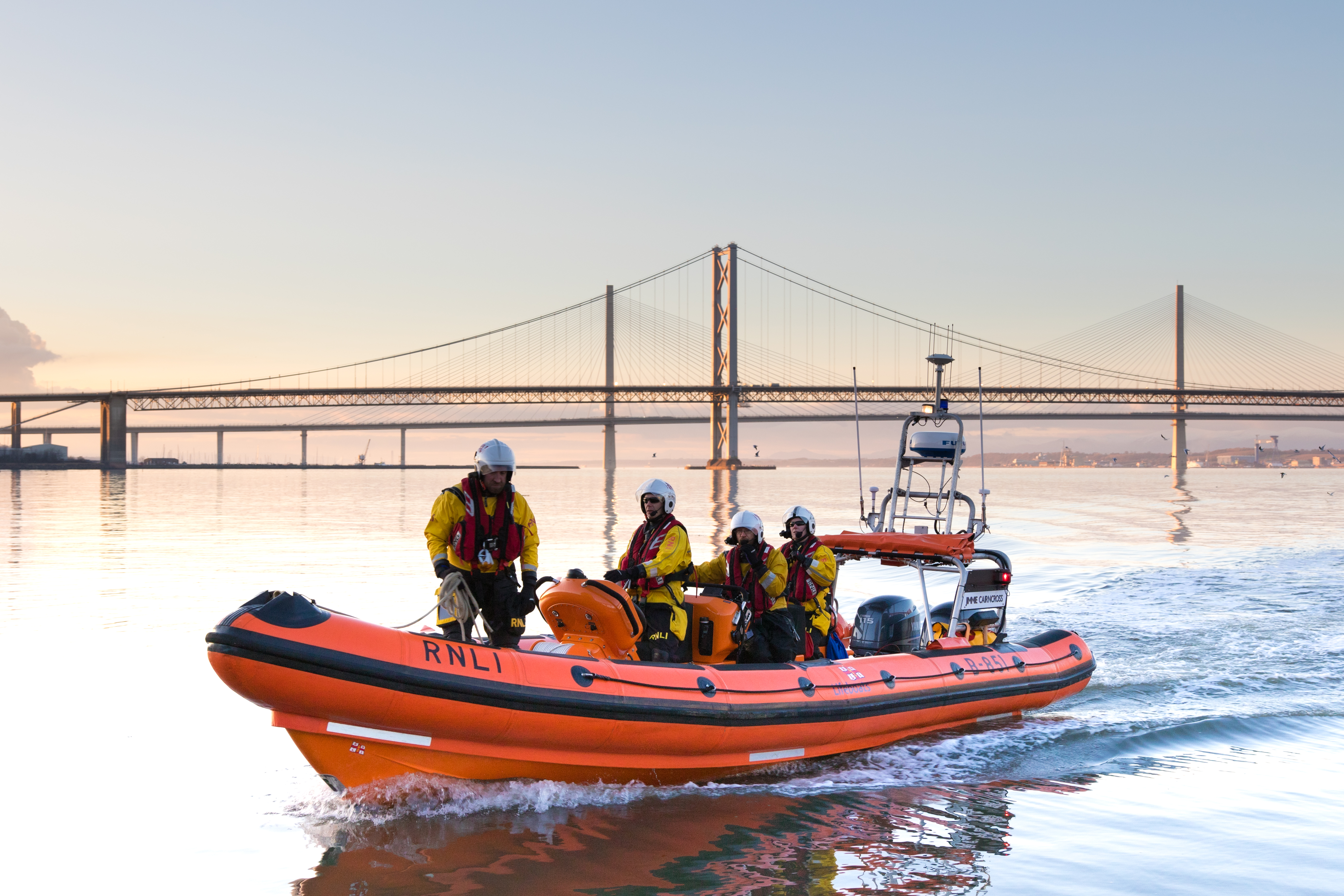
Queensferry's B-class (Atlantic 85) Inshore lifeboat Jimmy Cairncross (B-851)

In August 1911, due to construction works at the lifeboat station, members of the Queensferry lifeboat station attended Dundas Castle, home of station president Sir Jack Stewart-Clark Bt, for the naming ceremony of their new B-class (Atlantic 85) Inshore lifeboat, in the presence of HRH Prince Philip, Duke of Edinburgh. With a splash of whisky, the Duke named the lifeboat Jimmie Cairncross (B-851), after a Perth jeweller, a Life Governor of the RNLI, whose trust donated the funds to buy the boat.

All new facilities were provided in 2012, with the construction of a new station building, incorporating new crew facilities; changing and shower rooms; mechanic's workshop; boat hall for the Atlantic 85-class and launch tractor attached, allowing direct access to the river; training rooms; a Manager's office; and a crew room, with panoramic views of the River Forth estuary. A retail outlet was also provided.

In March 2024, the 200th anniversary of the founding of the RNLI, Queensferry Lifeboat Station celebrated 57 years of operations. Since opening in 1967, the lifeboat had been launched 2255 times, saving 188 lives. The station remains to be one of the busiest in Scotland, launching more than 100 times in 2021, a record figure for the station, with a similar number for 2022 and 2023.

== Station honours ==
The following are awards made at Queensferry:

- 'A Framed Letter of Thanks signed by the Chairman of the Institution'
  Ranald Durness Mackay, Helm – 1974
  James Crichton Smith – 1974
  Gordon Joseph McAlpine – 1974
- Member, Order of the British Empire (MBE)
  Thomas James Robertson, chairman, and former Lifeboat Operations Manager – 2010QBH
- Long Service Award
  Donald Quate, crew member, then Helm and later Deputy Launch Authority – 2016 (40 years)
  Thomas James Robertson MBE, chairman, and former Lifeboat Operations Manager – 2023 (50 years)

== Queensferry lifeboats ==
=== D class lifeboats ===
| Op.No. (Note: Op.No. is the RNLI's Operational Number of the boat carried on the hull.) | Name | On station | Class | Comments |
|---|---|---|---|---|
| D-145 | Unnamed | 1967–1971 | D-class (RFD PB16) | |
| D-176 | Unnamed | 1971–1972 | D-class (RFD PB16) | |

=== B class lifeboats ===
| Op.No. | Name | On station | Class | Comments |
|---|---|---|---|---|
| B-505 | Major Osman Gabriel | 1972–1975 | B-class (Atlantic 21) | |
| B-521 | Mary Livingstone | 1975–1981 | B-class (Atlantic 21) | |
| B-551 | Constance MacNay | 1981–1997 | B-class (Atlantic 21) | |
| B-735 | Donald and Ethel Macrae | 1997–2012 | B-class (Atlantic 75) | |
| B-851 | Jimmie Cairncross | 2012– | B-class (Atlantic 85) | |

== See also ==
- List of RNLI stations
- List of former RNLI stations
- Royal National Lifeboat Institution lifeboats
