= Port Erin Lifeboat Station =

RNLI lifeboat station on the Isle of Man

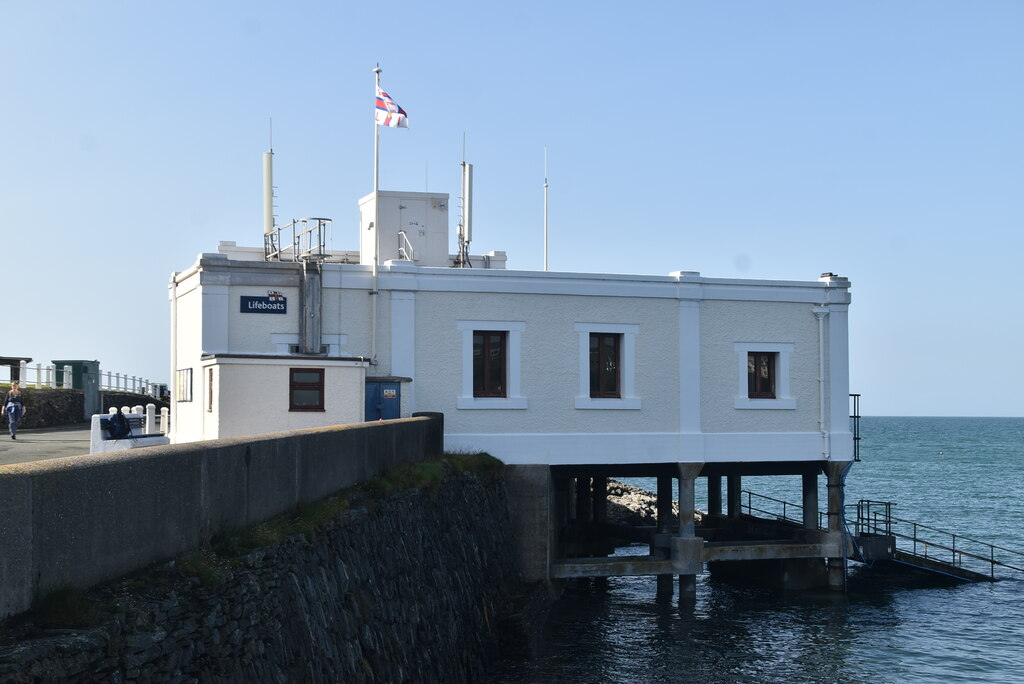
- Port Erin Lifeboat Station in 2023

- Location within Isle of Man

General information
- Type: RNLI Lifeboat Station
- Location: Breakwater Road, Port Erin, Isle of Man
- Coordinates: 54°05′06″N 004°46′06″W
- Opened: 1883
- Owner: Royal National Lifeboat Institution

Website
- Port Erin RNLI Lifeboat Station

Port Erin Lifeboat Station is located on Breakwater Road in Port Erin, a town 13.5 miles (21.7 km) south-west of Douglas, on the south-west coast of the Isle of Man, a British Crown Dependency.

A lifeboat station was established at Port Erin by the Royal National Lifeboat Institution (RNLI) in 1883.

The station currently operates the B-class (Atlantic 85) Inshore lifeboat, Neil Crowe (B-951), funded by the Gough Ritchie Trust, on station since 2025.

== History ==
At a meeting of the RNLI Management Committee on 7 September 1882, and following requests from local residents, it was agreed to form a Lifeboat Station at Port Erin.

On 28 August 1883, a 32 ft (9.8 m) 'Pulling and Sailing' (P&S) lifeboat, one with sails and (10) oars, was drawn on its carriage by eight horses, in grand procession from Douglas to the shore at Port Erin, where a Brass Band was in attendance. The cost of the lifeboat and its equipment had been defrayed from the legacy of the late Mr Richard Roberts of Blackley, Manchester.

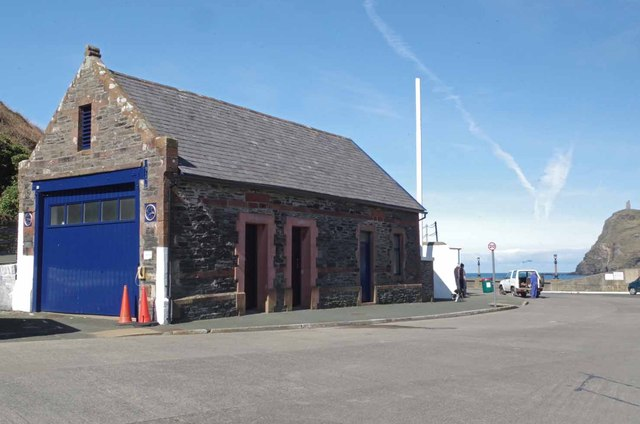
The 1884 Lifeboat House at Port Erin

On arrival at Port Erin, the ceremony commenced with an address by Henry Loch, Lieutenant Governor of the Isle of Man. After the lifeboat was handed to the care of the local lifeboat committee, and accepted by branch president Dr. R. Radcliffe, the lifeboat was named Ann and Mary of Manchester, in accordance with the wishes of the benefactor. The lifeboat was then launched for a demonstration to the assembled crowd.

A boathouse was constructed in 1884, opposite the Raglan Pier, at a cost of £250.

Ann and Mary of Manchester saw her first service on 4 January 1888, launching at 08:45 to the schooner Lyra, which had struck Carrick Rock whilst on passage from Liverpool to Dublin, and was wrecked in Port St Mary bay. The Master had been washed overboard and lost, but the lifeboat rescued the three remaining crew.

In accordance with the wishes of the Coxswain and crew for a larger lifeboat, Ann and Mary of Manchester was replaced in 1892, and a 37 ft (11 m) 12-oared lifeboat was provided to the station, arriving in January that year. The cost of the lifeboat was defrayed from the legacy of the late Miss L. C. Sargenson of New Bond Street, London, and in accordance with her wishes, the lifeboat was named William Sugden (ON 321). The boat served Port Erin for 20 years, and saved 12 lives.

To make launching easier, a slipway was constructed in 1900, at a cost of £1,000.

10 August 1925 saw the arrival of a 40 ft (12 m) self-righting motor-powered lifeboat on station, Ethel Day Cardwell (ON 647), previously on service at Tynemouth. This was the same year that a new boathouse was constructed along the breakwater road, a building still in use today. It is notable by its very steep 1:4 slipway, still regarded as the steepest incline of any RNLI lifeboat station.

The naming ceremony of the sixth lifeboat for Port Erin, a 37 ft (11 m) Rother-class lifeboat, was held on 4 August 1973. The lifeboat was named Osman Gabriel after her donor, Major Osman Gabriel. Between 1973 and 1992, she was launched 70 times, and saved 55 lives.

In 1990, a coastal review determined that a Mersey-class All-weather lifeboat would be placed at Peel, replacing their B-class (Atlantic 21), whilst Port Erin would receive an Atlantic 21 Inshore boat, to replace their Rother-class All-weather lifeboat.

On 24 June 2025, Port Erin received a new B-class (Atlantic 85) Inshore lifeboat. The lifeboat has been funded by the Gough Ritchie Trust, one of five lifeboats provided by the trust for the island, and named Neil Crowe (B-951) after one of their founding trustees, on 12 July 2025.

== Notable rescues ==
Just after 06:00 on the 9 September 1970, the Port Erin All-weather lifeboat Matthew Simpson (ON 823) was launched into a very rough sea and SSW gale, to reports of the coaster Moonlight in difficulties, 5 miles (8 km) north of Chicken Rock. A life-raft located by aircraft was found to be empty. At 11:00, a second life-raft was spotted, and found to contain just two survivors from the Moonlight. The two men were landed at Port Erin by the lifeboat at 13:00. For this service, Coxswain Alfred Dennis Maddrell BEM was awarded the RNLI Bronze Medal.

== Station honours ==
The following are awards made at Port Erin:

- RNLI Bronze Medal
  Alfred Dennis Maddrell BEM, Coxswain – 1970
- 'The Thanks of the Institution inscribed on Vellum'
  Peter Woodworth, Coxswain – 1978
- British Empire Medal
  Alfred Dennis Maddrell, Coxswain – 1969QBH

== Port Erin lifeboats ==
=== Pulling and Sailing (P&S) lifeboats ===
ON (Note: ON is the RNLI's Official Number of the boat.)	Name	Built	On station	Class	Comments
Pre-660	Ann and Mary of Manchester	1883	1883–1892	32-foot Prowse self-righting (P&S)	(Note: 32 ft 0 in (9.75 m) x 7 ft 6 in (2.29 m) (10-oared) Prowse-class self-righting (P&S) lifeboat, legacy of Mr R. Roberts of Blackley, Manchester, built by Woolfe of Shadwell, London, costing £282.); Sold in 1894.
321	William Sugden	1891	1892–1912	37-foot self-righting (P&S)	(Note: 37 ft 0 in (11.28 m) x 8 ft 0 in (2.44 m) (12-oared) self-righting (P&S) lifeboat, funded from the legacy of Miss L. C. Sargenson of London, built by Forrest of Limehouse, London, costing £544.); Sold in 1912.
634	Henry Kirk	1912	1912–1925	37-foot self-righting (P&S)	(Note: 37 ft 0 in (11.28 m) x 9 ft 3 in (2.82 m) (10-oared) self-righting (P&S) lifeboat, funded from the legacy of Mr H. Kirk of Beeston, built by Thames Ironworks of Blackwall, London, costing £1,239.); Sold in 1937. Renamed Peal o'Bells. Last reported at Southampton in 1948.

Pre ON numbers are unofficial numbers used by the Lifeboat Enthusiast Society to reference early lifeboats not included on the official RNLI list.

=== Motor lifeboats ===
ON	Op. No. (Note: Op. No. is the RNLI's Operational Number of the boat carried on the hull.)	Name	Built	On station	Class	Comments
647	–	Ethel Day Cardwell	1917	1925–1939	40-foot self-righting (motor)	(Note: 40 ft 0 in (12.19 m) x 10 ft 6 in (3.20 m) self-righting (motor) lifeboat, legacy of Mr J. T. Cardwell, built by S. E. Saunders of Cowes, costing £4,746 when new.); Previously at Teesmouth. Transferred to the relief fleet. Sold in 1942, and renamed Bay Monarch.
823	–	Matthew Simpson	1939	1939–1972	41-foot Watson	
998	32-27	Osman Gabriel	1972	1973–1992	Rother	

All-weather lifeboat withdrawn in 1992
More post-service details can be found on the respective lifeboat class pages.

=== Inshore lifeboats ===
==== B class ====
Op. No.	Name	On station	Class	Comments
B-515	Vee Webber	1992–1993	B-class (Atlantic 21)	Previously Blue Peter II at Beaumaris
B-594	Herbert and Edith	1993–2006	B-class (Atlantic 21)	
B-813	Muriel and Leslie	2006–2025	B-class (Atlantic 85)	
B-951	Neil Crowe	2025–	B-class (Atlantic 85)	

== See also ==
- List of RNLI stations
- List of former RNLI stations
- Royal National Lifeboat Institution lifeboats
