= Mudeford Lifeboat Station =

RNLI lifeboat station in Dorset, England

- Flag of the RNLI

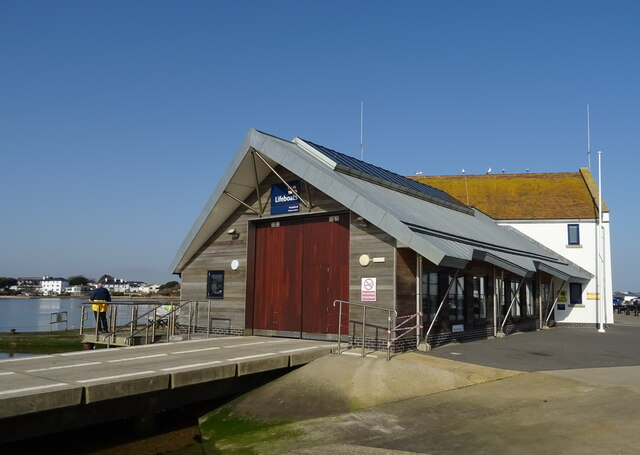
- Mudeford Lifeboat Station in 2022

- Location within Dorset

General information
- Type: Lifeboat station
- Location: Mudeford Quay, Mudeford, Christchurch, Dorset, BH23 4AB, England
- Coordinates: 50.724337°N 1.742143°W
- Opened: Station opened 1963; Present building 2003
- Owner: Royal National Lifeboat Institution

Website
- Mudeford RNLI Lifeboat Station

Mudeford Lifeboat Station can be found on Mudeford Quay, a promentory forming the north shore of the entrance to Christchurch Harbour, approximately 6 miles (9.7 km) east of Bournemouth, in the county of Dorset, England.

A lifeboat station was established at Mudeford by the Royal National Lifeboat Institution (RNLI) in 1963.

The station currently operates a B-class (Atlantic 85) Inshore lifeboat (ILB), Henrietta H (B-948), on station since 2024.

== History ==
Shortly after 13:00 on 30 March 1959, and despite having undergone serious surgery just 6 months previously, cafe owner Kenneth Derham put out from Avon Beach in a small 11 ft (3.4 m) rowing dinghy in terrible conditions, following reports of a capsized motor fishing boat with three people aboard. Arriving on scene, he managed to recover a 15-year-old girl to the boat, and with one male survivor clinging to the transom, brought both to shore. The third person, the girl's father, had already drowned. Derham had operated a one-man rescue service from Avon Beach since 1936. For his gallantry on this occasion, Kenneth Derham was awarded the RNLI Silver Medal.

In 1962, the number of rescues or attempted rescues by All-weather lifeboats in the summer months was 98, with the number of lives rescued being 133. In 1963, in response to an increasing amount of water-based leisure activity, the RNLI began trials of small fast Inshore lifeboats, placed at various locations around the country. These were easily launched with just a few people, ideal to respond quickly to local emergencies. This quickly proved to be very successful. In 1963, there were 226 rescues or attempted rescues in the summer months, as a result of which 225 lives were saved.

One of the first places chosen for one of the new Inshore lifeboats was Mudeford, in Dorset. A lifeboat station was established in June 1963, with the arrival of a D-class (RFD PB16) Inshore lifeboat, the unnamed (D-4). At the time, Inshore lifeboats were placed on station just for the summer season, and many boats were moved around to different stations. Mudeford are recorded as having eight different D-class Inshore lifeboats between 1963 and 1969.

As their usefulness was proven, some stations received an 'intermediate' ILB, which could operate in more severe conditions. As early as 1970, Mudeford was one of the stations used to trial a new Atlantic 21-class RIB, B-500.

In 1981, a new boathouse was constructed, officially opened on 28 June. The same year, an upgraded twin-engined D-class Inshore lifeboat was stationed at Mudeford. These boats were later re-classified as a C-class in 1983.

Crew facilities were improved in 1988, with the construction of a crew-room inside the boathouse. This coincided with the withdrawal of the C-class lifeboat, and the arrival of a much larger B-class (Atlantic 21), Alexander Duckham (B-529), 18 years after the class had first been trialed at Mudeford. The boat wasn't new, and had previously served at West Mersea.

Mudeford would receive a brand new Atlantic 21 in 1990. At a ceremony on 2 February 1991, outside the Avonmouth Hotel (now the Christchurch Harbour Hotel), with music provided by the Homefield School Swing Band, former Honorary Secretary, and now branch chairman, Kenneth Derham, was invited to name the new lifeboat in his honour. After first being handed to the care of the Institution by the donor, the lifeboat was subsequently handed to the Mudeford branch, accepted by Victor Derham, Honorary Secretary and son of Kenneth. After a service of dedication by the Reverend Canon Basil D. T. Trevor-Morgan, vicar of Christchurch, and the Reverend Michael Clayton, priest in charge of All Saints Church, Mudeford, Kenneth Derham named the new lifeboat Ken Derham (B-583), spraying champagne over both the lifeboat, and the crew.

In force 6 conditions, with rough seas and driving rain, the Mudeford lifeboat was launched on 30 October 1994. A boy was rescued after he was found clinging to a pole on a rock groyne off Barton Cliff, constantly being washed over by large waves. Helm Ian Parker, and crew members Stuart Ward and Toby Abbott, were accorded "The Thanks of the Institution inscribed on Vellum", formally presented by former mayor Edward Coupe on 14 August 1995.

Construction of a new station at Mudeford Quay, costing £589,286, was completed in 2003, becoming operational at the end of September. The building was designed to house a Talus MB-764 amphibious tractor, with room to accommodate the much larger Atlantic 85 Inshore lifeboat, due to be assigned to the station. The new building was officially opened on Saturday 25 October 2003 following a service of dedication.

It would be 2006 before the station got their Atlantic 85 lifeboat. Mudeford Servant (Civil Service No.48) (B-806) arrived on 22 September. The lifeboat was funded by "The Lifeboat Fund", the official charity of the Civil Service, which also receives support from employees of the Royal Mail and British Telecom, and was the 48th lifeboat to be funded this way since 1866. In her 18 years on station, Mudeford Servant was launched over 1000 times on service.

Mudeford Servant was replaced on 4 December 2024, by another B-class (Atlantic 85), funded from the bequest of Derek and Dorothy Hunter of Portsmouth, who left their entire estate to the RNLI. After a service of dedication led by the Rev. Kathy Hicken in June 2025, the new lifeboat was named Henrietta H (B-948).

== The Derham family ==
It is not uncommon for several generations of the same family to be lifeboat crew at the same station, such as the Cable family at Aldeburgh, or the Quinton family at Donaghadee. Despite having been established for just over 60 years, three generations of the Derham family have already served at Mudeford.

Whilst running his business at Avon Beach, Kenneth Derham (1908–1993) had also operated a single-handed rescue service since 1936. He was awarded the RNLI Silver Medal for the rescue of two people in 1959, and played no small part in the choice of Mudeford as one of the first RNLI Inshore lifeboat stations. He was appointed Honorary Secretary on its opening in 1963, and made branch chairman in 1976.

Kenneth's son Victor joined the Mudeford crew when the station opened in 1963. He would become Honorary Secretary (Lifeboat Operations Manager), and later be made branch president.

Victor's son Ian Derham joined the crew in 1993. After 28 years service, he hung up his dry suit for the final time on Monday 10 May 2021, after having attended three shouts in one day.

== Description ==
The crew facilities are in a two-storey building. This is rendered and has a tile roof; large first floor windows at both ends give views across the water. Adjoining this and at right angles is the boathouse. This is built of timber with large windows along one side that allow visitors to see the lifeboat inside. The roof is metal with large skylights. The boat doors open onto a concrete platform and shallow slipway.

== Area of operation ==
The Atlantic 85 can go out in Force 6/7 winds (Force 5/6 at night) and can operate at up to 35 knots (65 km/h) for 2½ hours. Adjacent Inshore lifeboats are at Lymington Lifeboat Station to the east, and Poole Lifeboat Station to the west. Larger All-weather lifeboats are stationed at Swanage, and at Yarmouth on the Isle of Wight.

== Station honours ==
The following are awards made at Mudeford:

- RNLI Silver Medal
  Kenneth Derham – 1959
- The Thanks of the Institution inscribed on Vellum
  Ian Parker, Helm – 1995
  Stuart Ward, crew member – 1995
  Toby Abbott, crew member – 1995
- Framed RNLI Letter of Commendation
  Mel Varvel, crew member – 2023
- Letter of Commendation from the RNLI Council
  Ian Parker, Helm – 2025

== Mudeford lifeboats ==
=== D-class ===
On station	Op. No. (Note: Op. No. is the RNLI's Operational Number of the boat carried on the hull.)	Name	Class	Comments
1963	D-4	Unnamed	D-class (RFD PB16)	
1964	D-7	Unnamed	D-class (RFD PB16)	First stationed at West Mersea in 1963.
1965	D-11	Unnamed	D-class (RFD PB16)	First stationed at Wells in 1963.
1965–1967	D-42	Unnamed	D-class (RFD PB16)	
1967	D-21	Unnamed	D-class (RFD PB16)	First stationed at Hastings in 1964.
1967–1968	D-156	Unnamed	D-class (RFD PB16)	
1968–1969	D-20	Unnamed	D-class (RFD PB16)	
1969–1970	D-76	Unnamed	D-class (RFD PB16)	Initially deployed on board Clyde-class 70-001 in 1966.
1970–1980	D-190	Unnamed	D-class (RFD PB16)	

=== C-class ===
On station	Op. No.	Name	Class	Comments
1981–1988	D-507	Unnamed	C-class (Zodiac Grand Raid IV)	Later reclassified as C-507 in 1983.

=== B-class ===
On station	Op. No.	Name	Class	Comments
1970	B-500	Unnamed	B-class (Atlantic 21)	On trial.
1988–1990	B-529	Alexander Duckham	B-class (Atlantic 21)	First stationed at West Mersea in 1976.
1990–2006	B-583	Ken Derham	B-class (Atlantic 21)	
2006–2024	B-806	Mudeford Servant (Civil Service No.48)	B-class (Atlantic 85)	
2024–	B-948	Henrietta H	B-class (Atlantic 85)	

=== Launch and recovery tractors ===
On station	Op. No.	Reg. No.	Type	Comments
2002–2006	TW05	UJT 151S	Talus MB-764 County	
2006–	TW33	M562 OUX	Talus MB-764 County	

== See also ==
- List of RNLI stations
- List of former RNLI stations
- Royal National Lifeboat Institution lifeboats
