= Galway Lifeboat Station =

RNLI lifeboat station in County Galway, Ireland

- Galway Lifeboat Station, County Galway in 2025

- Location within Ireland

General information
- Type: RNLI Lifeboat Station
- Location: New Docks, Port of Galway, Galway, County Galway, Ireland
- Coordinates: 53°16′08.9″N 9°02′48.6″W
- Opened: 1996
- Owner: Royal National Lifeboat Institution

Website
- Galway RNLI Lifeboat Station

Galway Lifeboat Station is located on New Docks, in the Port of Galway, a seaport in Galway, a city in County Galway approximately 200 km (120 mi) west of Dublin, on the west coast of Ireland.

A lifeboat station was established at Galway in 1996 by the Royal National Lifeboat Institution (RNLI).

The station currently operates the B-class (Atlantic 85) Inshore lifeboat, Binny (B-853), on station since 2011.

== History ==
In a violent storm of 20 November 1830, the brig Lillies was wrecked on Black Rock, near Galway. After several attempts to rescue the men failed, H.M. Coastguard boatman Bartholomew Hynes, with a crew of nine fishermen, managed to save four of the crew. Seventeen years later, on 7 February 1847, H.M. Coastguard Chief Boatman James McKenzie saved one man from the rigging from the vessel Sea Horse, when it was driven ashore at Galway. The Royal National Institution for the Preservation of Life from Shipwreck (RNIPLS), later to become the RNLI in 1854, would award medals for deeds of gallantry at sea, even if no lifeboats were involved. Bartholomew Hynes and James McKenzie were each awarded the RNIPLS Silver Medal.

It would be another 80 years before Galway Bay Lifeboat Station was established on the Aran Islands in 1927, at the entrance to Galway Bay, and a further 69 years before the establishment of the Galway Lifeboat Station, operating an Inshore lifeboat.

In 1996, with the RNLI looking to increase lifeboat coverage on the west coast of Ireland, and an increased number of incidents in the Galway Bay area, it was decided to establish a station on New Docks (road), in the Port of Galway, for a one-year evaluation period. A succession of temporary B-class (Atlantic 21) lifeboats were sent to the station, the first being Foresters (B-531). Temporary crew facilities were provided, but with no boathouse, the lifeboat was kept at the workplace of the station's secretary, able to be towed to a variety of launch sites. With no slipway available at the base location, a davit was installed, to lower the lifeboat into the water.

Following the successful completion of the evaluation period, the station becoming one of the busiest in Ireland in that first year, it was agreed that a permanent station was necessary. Plans were submitted for the construction of a boathouse on the revetment next to the davit, which were approved. Work began in February 1997, and the station was completed in the September of the same year.

On 3 September 1997, the station received their permanent B-class (Atlantic 75) Inshore lifeboat. The cost of the lifeboat, £75,000, was raised locally, and a further £75,000 was donated to the station. At a naming ceremony on Saturday 4 October 1997, the lifeboat was named Dochas (B-738), after a competition in the local media. 'Dochas' is an old Irish word for 'Hope'.

Dochas (B-738) was withdrawn from service in 2010, and for a short time was replaced by the relief lifeboat Miss Miriam and Miss Nellie Garbutt (B-757).

In 2011, the boathouse was refurbished, and the davit was replaced with a more powerful version, now allowing the crew to be lifted with the lifeboat. A new larger B-class (Atlantic 85) was placed on service. At a naming ceremony on Saturday 6 October 2012, the €244,000 lifeboat, funded by Audrey Lydia Finch of Devon, was named Binny (B-853), in memory of her first husband Jack 'Binny' Binstead. Between arriving on station in 2011, and the naming ceremony, the lifeboat was launched 19 times, and had brought 10 people to safety.

== Station honours ==
The following are awards made at Galway:

- RNIPLS Silver Medal
  Bartholomew Hynes, Boatman, H.M. Coastguard – 1830
  James McKenzie, Chief Boatman, H.M. Coastguard – 1847

== Galway lifeboats ==
=== Inshore lifeboats ===
==== B class ====
Op.No. (Note: Op.No. is the RNLI's Operational Number of the boat carried on the hull.)	Name	On station	Class	Comments
B-531	Foresters	1996	B-class (Atlantic 21)	
B-533	Unnamed	1996	B-class (Atlantic 21)	
B-590	Wolverson X-Ray	1996–1997	B-class (Atlantic 21)	
B-738	Dochas	1997–2010	B-class (Atlantic 75)	
B-757	Miss Miriam and Miss Nellie Garbutt	2010–2011	B-class (Atlantic 75)	
B-853	Binny	2011–	B-class (Atlantic 85)	

== See also ==
- List of RNLI stations
- List of former RNLI stations
- Royal National Lifeboat Institution lifeboats

== Sources ==
- Leonard, Richie; Denton, Tony (2026). Lifeboat Enthusiasts Handbook 2026. Lifeboats Enthusiasts' Society.
