= Stradling =

Stradling is a surname, and may refer to:

- Edward Stradling, disambiguation
- Ed Stradling (born 1972), British TV producer/director
- Harry Stradling (1901–1970), American cinematographer
- John Stradling, disambiguation
- Reginald Stradling (1891–1952), British engineer and government scientist
- Thomas Stradling, disambiguation
