= Edward Stradling =

Edward Stradling may refer to:

- Edward Stradling (1529–1609), MP for Steyning 1554, MP for Arundel 1557–58
- Sir Edward Stradling, 2nd Baronet (1601–1644)
- Sir Edward Stradling, 3rd Baronet (c 1624–c 1660) of Cardiff Castle
- Sir Edward Stradling, 4th Baronet (c 1643–1685) of the Stradling baronets
- Sir Edward Stradling, 5th Baronet (1672–1735), MP for Cardiff Boroughs 1710–22
- Edward Stradling (1699–1726), son of the 5th Baronet, MP for Cardiff Boroughs 1722–26
