= Thomas Stradling =

Thomas Stradling may refer to:

- Sir Thomas Stradling, 6th Baronet
- Thomas Stradling (MP) (by 1495-1571) for Arundel and East Grinstead
