= Sir John Stradling, 1st Baronet =

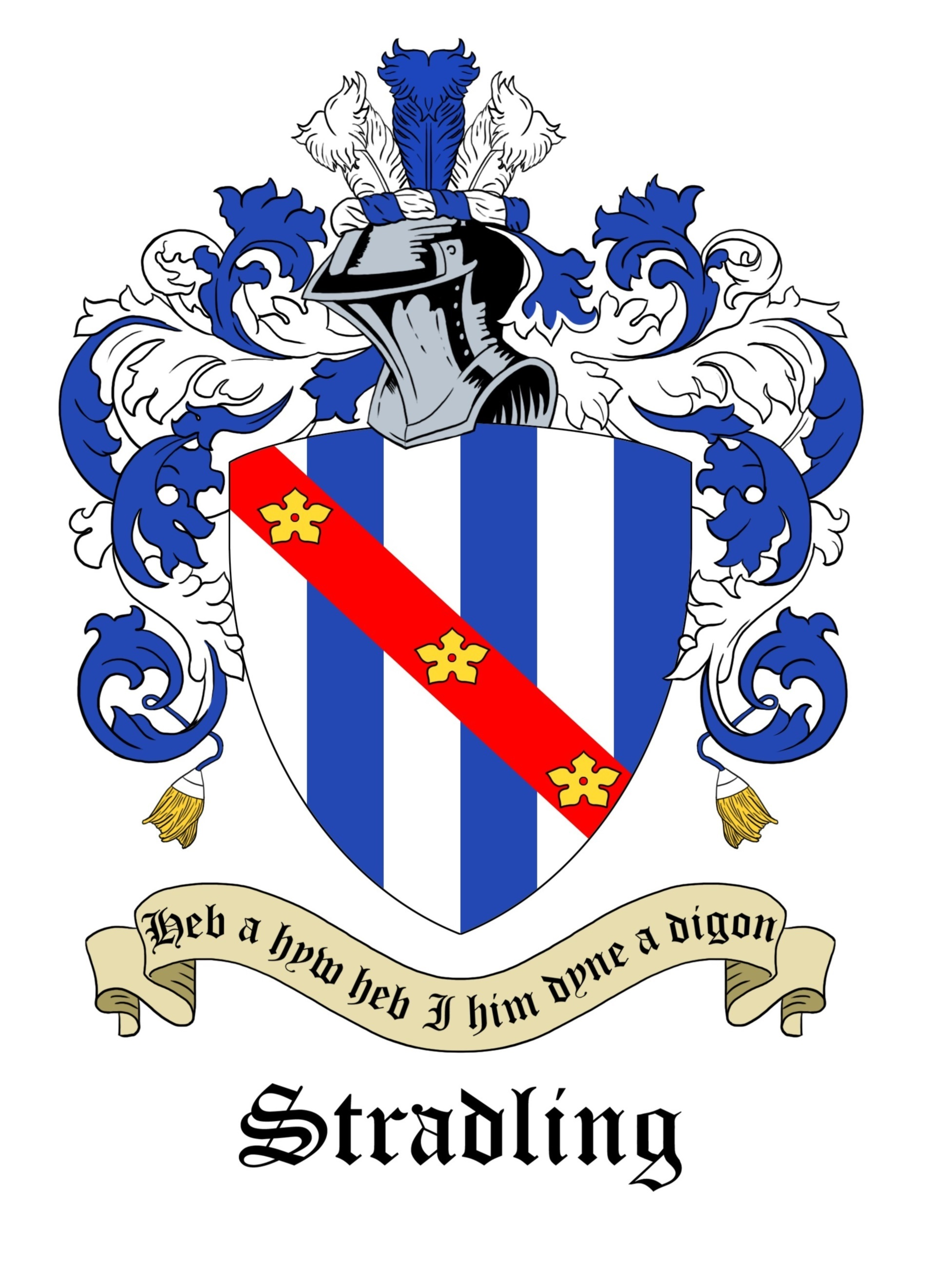

Sir John Stradling, 1st Baronet (1563 – 9 September 1637), was an English poet, scholar and politician.

== Life ==
John Stradling was the son of Francis and Elizabeth Stradling of St George, Bristol, and was adopted by his second cousin, Sir Edward Stradling. He was educated under Edward Green, a canon of Bristol, before matriculating at Brasenose College, Oxford in 1580. He graduated BA from Magdalen Hall in 1584, having gained a reputation as "a miracle for his forwardness in learning and pregnancy of parts". After studying for a while at one of the inns of court, he travelled abroad.

Stradling was Sheriff of Glamorgan for 1608 and 1620. Knighted on 15 May 1608, he was then described as living in Shropshire. In 1609, on the death of Sir Edward Stradling, he inherited St Donat's Castle and estate in Glamorgan. On 22 May 1611 he was created Baronet.

Stradling was member of parliament for St. Germans, Cornwall, (1623–1624), Old Sarum (1625), and Glamorgan (1625–1626).

To carry out the wishes of Sir Edward, Stradling built, equipped, and endowed Cowbridge Grammar School, though the endowment seems to have subsequently lapsed until the school was refounded by Sir Leoline Jenkins.

He married Elizabeth, daughter of Edward Gage; they had eight sons and three daughters. Their eldest son Edward inherited the title; their fourth son Henry was a Royalist captain; and their eighth son George was Dean of Chichester. Their eldest daughter Jane married William Thomas of Wenvoe, and had a daughter Elizabeth, who married the regicide Edmund Ludlow.

Stradling enjoyed a great reputation for learning. He "was courted and admired" by William Camden, who quotes him as "vir doctissimus" in his Britannia, by Sir John Harington, Thomas Leyson, and Ioan David Rhys, to all of whom he wrote epigrams.

== Works ==
Stradling was author or translator of:

- (tr.) A Direction for travailers taken out of Epistola de Peregrinatione Italica … for the behoofe of the … Earl of Bedford by Justus Lipsius, 1592
- (tr.) Two bookes of constancie … Englished by J.S. by Justus Lipsius, 1595
- De vita et morte contemnenda libri duo, 1597
- J. Stradlingi epigrammatum libri quatuor, 1607
- Beati Pacifici; a divine poem, 1623
- Divine Poems, 1625
- The storie of the lower borowes of Merthyrmawr, ed. H. J. Randall and William Rees, South Wales and Monmouth record society, 1932

Baronetage of England
New creation	Baronet (of St Donats); 1611–1637	Succeeded by Edward Stradling
