= Allmendingen =

Allmendingen may refer to:

== In Germany ==
- Allmendingen, Germany

== In Switzerland ==
- Allmendingen bei Bern, in the Canton of Bern
- Allmendingen bei Thun, part of Thun, Canton of Bern
