= John Stradling =

John Stradling may refer to:

- Sir John Stradling, 1st Baronet, English poet, scholar and politician
- John Stradling (priest), Archdeacon of Llandaff

== See also ==
- Sir John Stradling Thomas, Welsh politician
