= Good Housekeeping =

American women's magazine

- Editor-in-chief: Jane Francisco
- Categories: Lifestyle and product reviews
- Frequency: Bi-monthly
- Publisher: Hearst Magazines
- Total circulation: 929,100 (2024)
- First issue: May 2, 1885; 141 years ago
- Country: United States
- Based in: New York City
- Language: English
- Website: goodhousekeeping.com
- ISSN: 0017-209X

Good Housekeeping is an American lifestyle media brand that covers a wide range of topics from home decor and renovation, health, beauty and food, to entertainment, pets and gifts. The Good Housekeeping Institute which opened its "Experiment Station" in 1900, specializes in product reviews by a staff of scientific experts. The GH Institute is known, in part, for the "Good Housekeeping Seal", a limited warranty program that evaluates products to ensure they perform as intended.

Good Housekeeping was founded in 1885 by American publisher and poet Clark W. Bryan. By the time of its acquisition by the Hearst Corporation in 1911, the magazine had grown to a circulation of 300,000 subscribers. By the early 1960s, it had over five million subscribers and was one of the world's most popular lifestyle magazines.

== History and profile ==
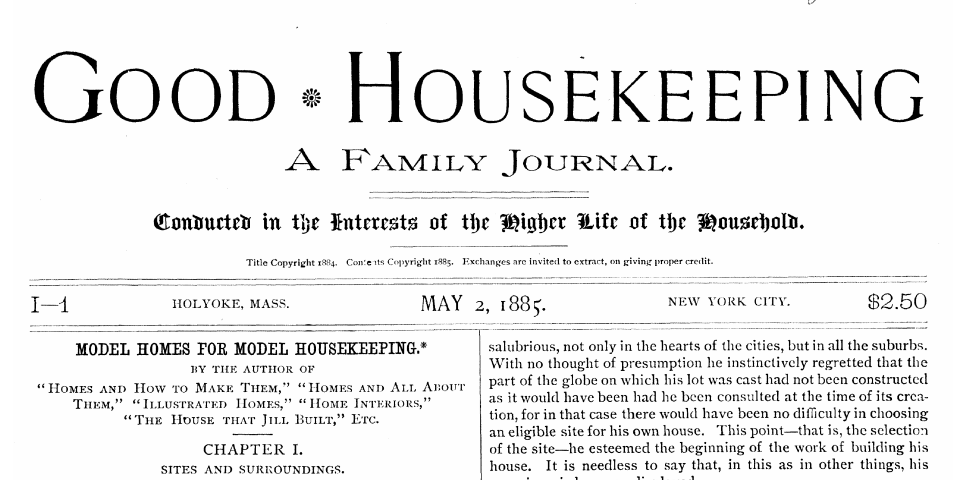
Masthead for the first issue of Good Housekeeping, May 2, 1885

On May 2, 1885, Clark W. Bryan founded Good Housekeeping in Holyoke, Massachusetts, as a fortnightly magazine. The magazine became a monthly publication in 1891.

The magazine achieved a circulation of 300,000 by 1911, at which time it was bought by the Hearst Corporation. It topped one million in the mid-1920s, and continued to rise, even during the Great Depression and its aftermath. In 1938, a year in which the magazine advertising dropped 22 percent, Good Housekeeping showed an operating profit of $2,583,202, more than three times the profit of Hearst's other eight magazines combined, and probably the most profitable monthly of its time. Circulation topped 2,500,000 in 1943, 3,500,000 in the mid-1950s, 5,000,000 in 1962, and 5,500,000 per month in 1966. 1959 profits were more than $11 million.

Good Housekeeping was one of the "Seven Sisters", a group of women's service magazines, and is one of the three of them still published in print.

In 1922, the Hearst Corporation created a British edition along the same lines, named British Good Housekeeping.

Famous writers who have contributed to the magazine include A. J. Cronin, Robert Graves, Betty Friedan, Frances Parkinson Keyes, Clara Savage Littledale, Edwin Markham, Somerset Maugham, Edna St. Vincent Millay, J. D. Salinger, Evelyn Waugh, and Virginia Woolf. Other contributors include advice columnists, chefs, and politicians.

== Good Housekeeping Institute ==
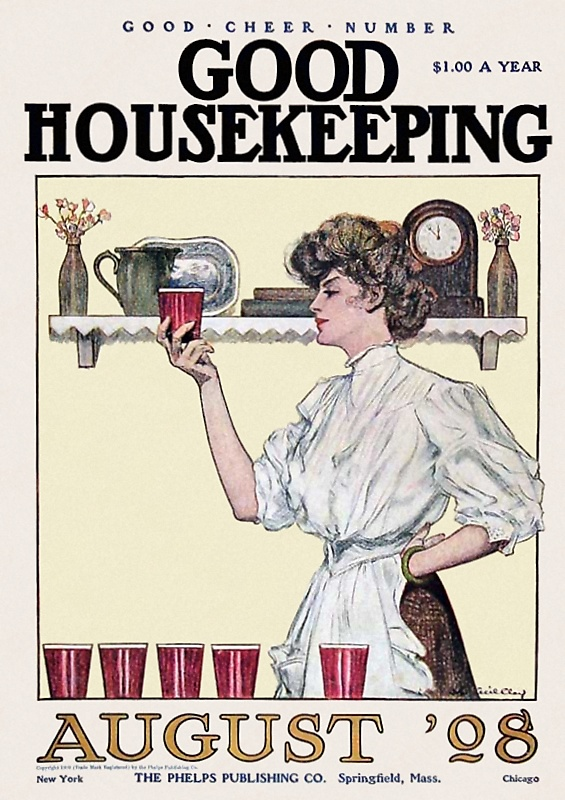
Cover from August 1908 made by John Cecil Clay

In 1900, the "Experiment Station", the predecessor to the Good Housekeeping Research Institute (GHRI), now known as the Good Housekeeping Institute, was founded. In 1902, the magazine was calling this "An Inflexible Contract Between the Publisher and Each Subscriber". The formal opening of the headquarters of the GH Institute – the "Model Kitchen", "Testing Station for Household Devices", and "Domestic Science Laboratory" – occurred in January 1910.

In 1909, the magazine established the Good Housekeeping Seal. Products advertised in the magazine that bear the GH Seal are tested by GH Institute experts and are backed by a two-year limited warranty. About 5,000 products have been given the seal.

In April 1912, a year after Hearst bought the magazine, Harvey W. Wiley, the first commissioner of the U.S. Food and Drug Administration (1907–1912), became head of the Good Housekeeping Research Institute and a contributing editor whose "Question Box" feature ran for decades. Beginning with a "Beauty Clinic" in 1932, departments were added to the Institute, including a "Baby's Center", "Foods and Cookery", and a "Needlework Room". Some functioned as testing laboratories, while others were designed to produce editorial copy.

In 1924, the British Good Housekeeping magazine set up its own Good Housekeeping Institute at 49 Wellington Street in Covent Garden, London. Its first director was Dorothy Cottington Taylor who ran the "a highly organised laboratory for testing and investigating every kind of household appliance, method, and recipe" for sixteen years.

After the passage of the Federal Food, Drug, and Cosmetic Act of 1938, Assistant Secretary of Agriculture Rexford Tugwell sought to promote a government grading system. The Hearst Corporation opposed the policy in spirit, and began publishing a monthly tabloid attacking federal oversight. In 1939, the Federal Trade Commission filed a complaint against Good Housekeeping for "misleading and deceptive" guarantees including the Seal, and "exaggerated and false" claims in its advertisements. The publisher fought the proceedings for two years, during which time competing editors from the Ladies Home Journal and McCall's testified against Good Housekeeping. The FTC's ultimate ruling was against the magazine, forcing it to remove some claims and phraseology from its ad pages. The words "Tested and Approved" were dropped from the Seal. But the magazine's popularity was unaffected, steadily rising in circulation and profitability. In 1962, the wording of the Seal was changed to a guarantee of "Product or Performance", while dropping its endorsement of rhetorical promises made by the advertisers. In its varying forms, the Seal became inextricably associated with the magazine, and many others (e.g., McCall's, Parents, and Better Homes and Gardens) mimicked the practice.

== International editions ==
Good Housekeeping began to be published in the United Kingdom in 1922. William Randolph Hearst appointed Alice Maud Head initially as assistant editor. Head rose to be the managing director, as well as purportedly being the highest paid woman in Europe. As Hearst's deputy, Head would make decisions on his behalf about not just editing, but also buying for him St Donat's Castle, expensive art objects, and three giraffes for his zoo. Head remained head until 1939.

In Latin America, a Spanish version of the magazine, titled Buenhogar, was published in the United States and Latin America by the Editorial América corporation in Mexico from 1961, under license from the Hearst Corporation.

In Russia, the magazine was published first as Domashny Ochag ("Good Home, or Hearth"), before changing its name to Novy Ochag ("New Home, or Hearth") sometime in July 2022. Published by Independent Media, and described as "a resource for women who take care of their homes, raise children, have successful careers and help others", Novy Ochag recorded a digital readership of 13 million in October 2023.

Good Housekeeping launched two editions in South Africa in 2011, in English as Good Housekeeping and in Afrikaans as Goeie Huishouding. The magazine closed in 2020.

== American editors ==
- Clark W. Bryan (1885–1898)
- James Eaton Tower (1899–1913)
- William Frederick Bigelow (1913–1942)
- Herbert Raymond Mayes (1942–1958)
- Wade Hampton Nichols Jr. (1959–1975)
- John Mack Carter (1975–1994)
- Ellen Levine (1994–2006)
- Rosemary Ellis (2006–2013)
- Jane Francisco (2013–2025)
- Elspeth Velten (2025–present)

== See also ==
- Consumer Reports
- Nat Mags (UK publisher)
