= St Donat's Castle =

Castle in St Donats, Vale of Glamorgan, Wales

- Castell Sain Dunwyd (Welsh)
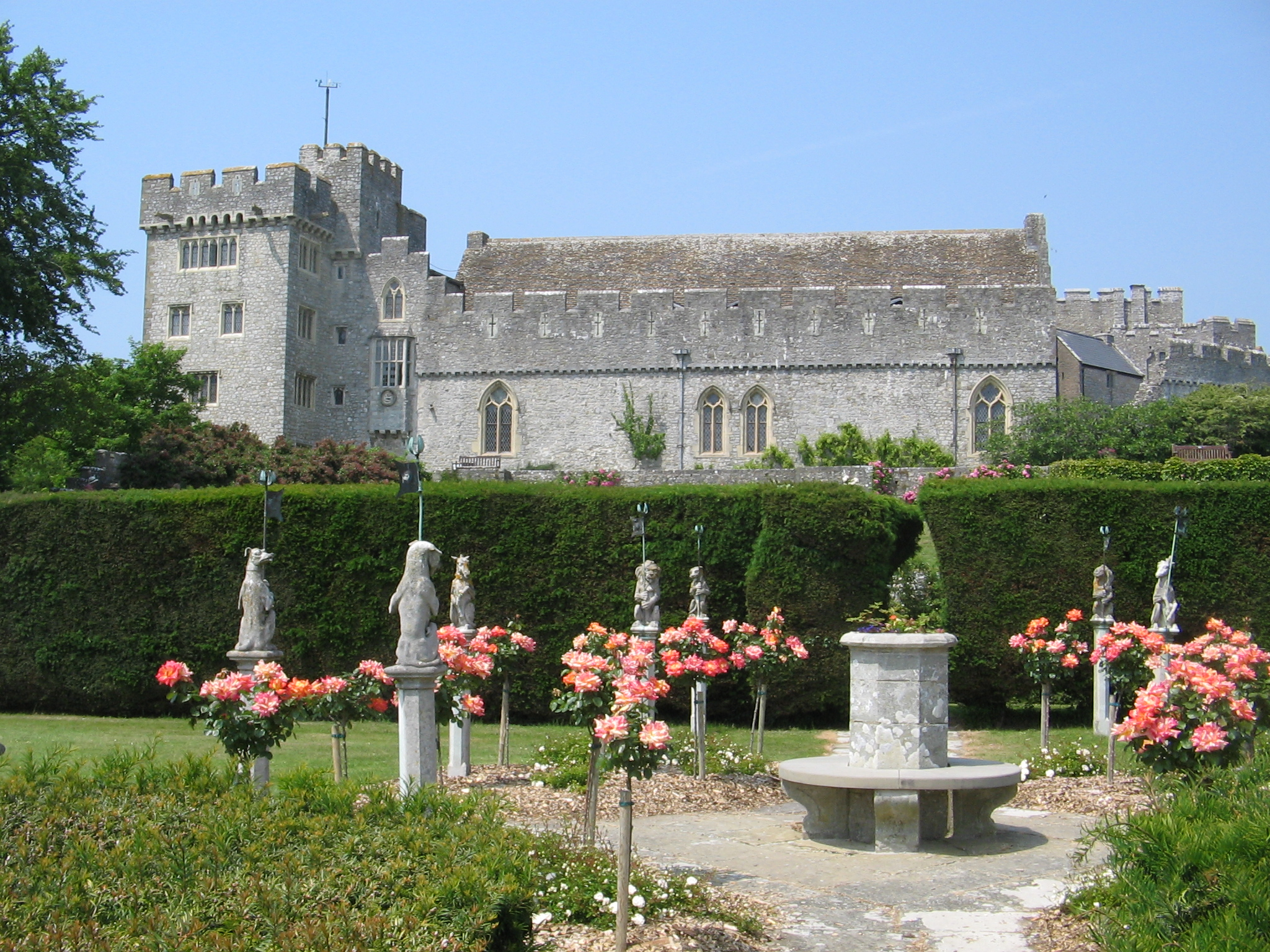
- St Donat's Castle from the Tudor Garden "An exceptionally fine medieval castle"

- Location of St Donat's Castle in the Vale of Glamorgan
- 51.4020°N 3.5334°W
- Type: Castle
- Location: St Donats, Llantwit Major

History
- Built: c. 1300 onwards

Site notes
- Area: Vale of Glamorgan
- Owner: Atlantic College

Listed Building – Grade I
- Official name: St Donats Castle (United World College of the Atlantic), including entrance Bridge
- Designated: 16 December 1952
- Reference no.: 13325

Listed Building – Grade I
- Official name: Walls, Steps, Terraces, Pavilion, Summerhouses and Cottage attached to wall of the Hanging Gardens
- Designated: 22 February 1963
- Reference no.: 13326

Cadw/ICOMOS Register of Parks and Gardens of Special Historic Interest in Wales
- Official name: St Donats Castle Gardens
- Designated: 1 February 2022
- Reference no.: PGW(Gm)30(GLA)
- Listing: Grade I

St Donat's Castle (Welsh: Castell Sain Dunwyd), St Donats, Wales, is a medieval castle in the Vale of Glamorgan, about 16 miles (26 km) to the west of Cardiff, and about 1 1/2 miles (2.4 km) to the west of Llantwit Major. Positioned on cliffs overlooking the Bristol Channel, the site has been occupied since the Iron Age, and was by tradition the home of the Celtic chieftain Caradog. The present castle's origins date from the 12th century when the de Haweys and later Peter de Stradling began its development. The Stradlings held the castle for four hundred years, until the death of Sir Thomas Stradling in a duel in 1738.

During the 18th century, the castle's status and condition declined and by the early 19th century it was only partly habitable. The later 19th and early 20th centuries saw several restorations. In 1852, it was purchased by John Whitlock Nicholl Carne, who claimed descent from the Stradlings but whose efforts at reconstruction were not well regarded. More enlightened improvements were made by its subsequent owner, the coal magnate Morgan Stuart Williams.

The castle's transformation occurred after its purchase in 1925 by William Randolph Hearst, the American newspaper tycoon. Hearst undertook a "brutal" expansion, including the incorporation of elements from other ancient structures such as the roofs of Bradenstoke Priory in Wiltshire and St Botolph's Church in Lincolnshire. His approach to architectural reclamation was controversial and the destruction of Bradenstoke was opposed in a vigorous campaign organised by the Society for the Protection of Ancient Buildings. Bernard Shaw described the castle after Hearst's reconstruction as "what God would have built if he had had the money". Despite spending vast sums of money on St Donat's, Hearst rarely visited and in 1937, with the Hearst Corporation facing financial collapse, the castle was put up for sale, but with war looming, the castle was instead requisitioned for use by the army.

In 1960, some nine years after Hearst's death, it was purchased by the son of the businessman and educational philanthropist Antonin Besse and donated to the trustees of Atlantic College, the first of the United World Colleges. Today the castle is home to some 350 international students and, with a history of occupation extending back to the late 13th century, is among the oldest continuously inhabited castles in Wales. Both the castle and the grounds are of historical and architectural importance, and have Grade I listed status.

== History ==
=== Stradling family: 1300–1738 ===
According to tradition, the site of St Donat's was the place to which Caradog, the Celtic chieftain, returned after being released from imprisonment in Rome by the emperor Claudius. After the Norman invasion of Wales in the mid-11th century, a timber castle was constructed on the site. The earliest surviving parts of the present castle, the keep and the inner ward, were built in the late 12th century by the de Hawey family. Ownership passed to the Stradling family through the marriage of Sir Peter Stradling to Joan de Hawey. (Note: In his study of the castle and the Stradling family, George Thomas Clark, the historian of Glamorgan, records the Hawey heiress as Julian.) The Stradlings were adventurers from Strättligen in Switzerland, who came to South Wales in the late 13th century. Sir Peter, his wife and later her second husband John de Pembridge, extended the castle around 1300, building the outer gatehouse and curtain wall and enlarging the keep and inner gatehouse.

The Stradling family served as magistrates, members of parliament, sheriffs and deputy lieutenants of Glamorganshire from the 13th to the 18th centuries. A number achieved more than local fame. The third Sir Edward Stradling, in a run of nine Edwards, fought at the Battle of Agincourt, married a great-granddaughter of Edward III and established himself as a powerful landowner and courtier. One of Edward's sons, Henry, was seized by pirates in the Bristol Channel while travelling from his Somerset estates to St Donat's, and was released only on payment of a large ransom. This event has subsequently been much embellished by, among others, Taliesin Williams in his account The Doom of Colyn Dolphyn: A Poem, with Notes Illustrative of Various Traditions of Glamorganshire, which involves the eponymous Breton pirate and the witch Mallt-y-Nos. (Note: Taliesin Williams, son of the renowned forger Iolo Morganwg was a prolific Welsh poet. His poem, The Doom of Colyn Dolphyn tells of the seizure of Harry Stradling by Dolphyn, Dolphyn's subsequent capture and his final end on the gallows. A flavour of the poem can be gained from the final quatrain: "Here ceas'd the tale – From central tower The clock proclaim'd protracted hour:– From Stradling's hall the guests depart:– But leave it with reluctant heart.") Henry Stradling's nautical misadventures continued; after acceding to the baronetcy, he died of a fever at Famagusta, returning from a pilgrimage to the Holy Land.The Stradlings remained adherents of the Catholic faith following the Reformation and experienced persecution as a consequence. Sir Thomas Stradling (1495–1571) was imprisoned in the Tower of London in 1561, following accusations of his having used the appearance of a "miraculous" cross in the trunk of an ash tree on the St Donat's estate to encourage support for the Catholic cause.

His son, the scholar Edward Stradling (1528/9–1609) established a celebrated, and exceptionally large, library at St Donat's, which was considered the finest in Wales of its time. The historian Graham Thomas records the Stradling tradition of educating their sons abroad, which led to the library holding extensive collections of foreign-language texts, particularly Italian works. (Note: The library was sold at the end of the 18th century and the current locations of many of its contents are unknown.) Edward Stradling wrote a history of the area, The Winning of the Lordship of Glamorgan out of Welshmen's Hands, which established the legend of the Twelve Knights of Glamorgan, including the inaccurate claim that the first Stradlings had arrived with William the Conqueror, rather than some 200 years later. He was also the patron of Siôn Dafydd Rhys and funded the production and publication of the latter's Cambrobrytannicae Cymraecaeve Linguae Institutiones et Rudimenta, the first Welsh language grammar to be published in Latin and thus widely accessible.

During the English Civil War the Stradlings, prominent Royalists, supported Charles I and hosted the archbishop James Ussher, when he had to flee Cardiff. Three Stradlings fought at the Battle of St Fagans in 1648 and two were forced into exile after the King's execution. After the Civil War, the family declined in importance and ceased to occupy any significant position in the country and, ultimately, within Glamorgan. They retained ownership of St Donat's Castle until the death of Sir Thomas Stradling in a duel in France in 1738. The exact circumstances of his death are uncertain; he was travelling with his university friend Sir John Tyrwhitt, with whom he had reputedly made a pact, each promising the other his inheritance in the event of his death. Sources dispute whether the duel was actually between Stradling and Tyrwhitt, or was contrived by Tyrwhitt. In either event, Stradling was killed and Tyrwhitt inherited his estates. (Note: Some sources suggest that Tyrwhitt inherited indirectly, through Baron Mansell of Margam.)

=== Decline and recovery: 1739–1925 ===
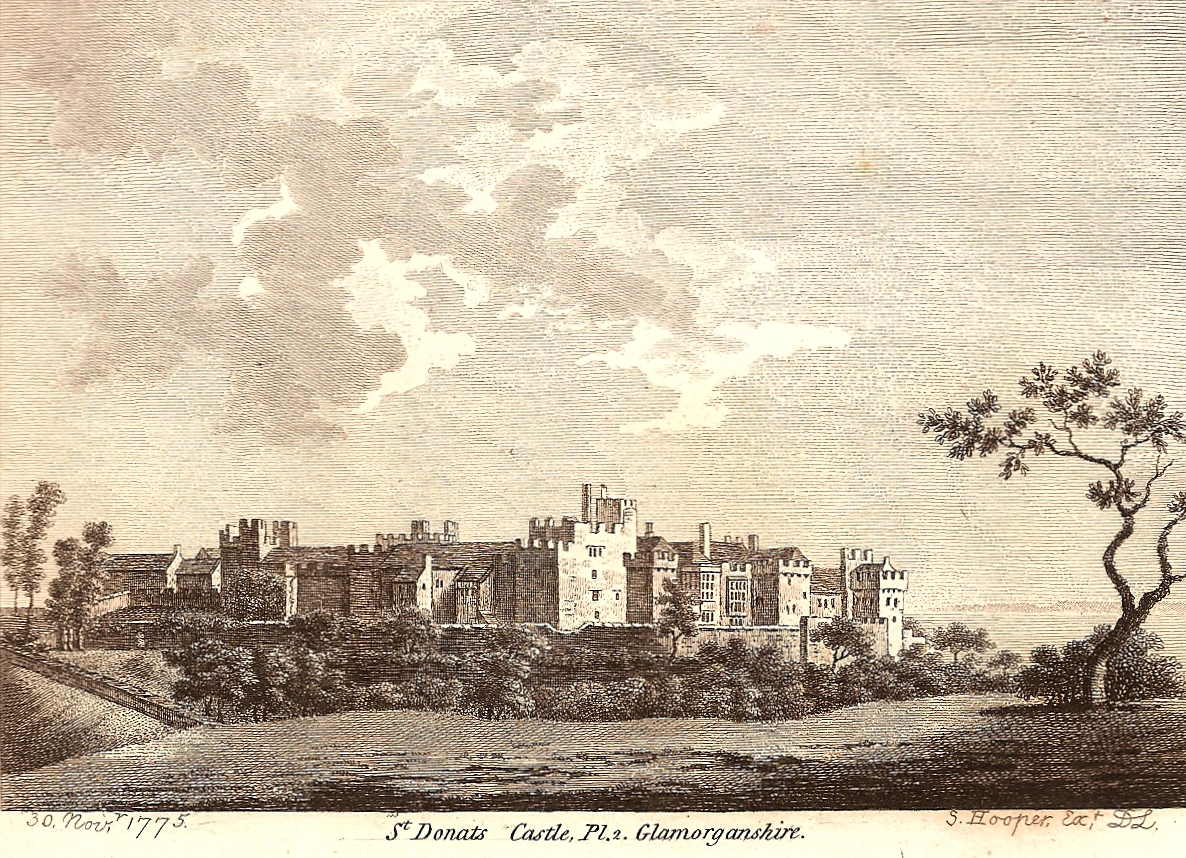
The castle in a print of 1775

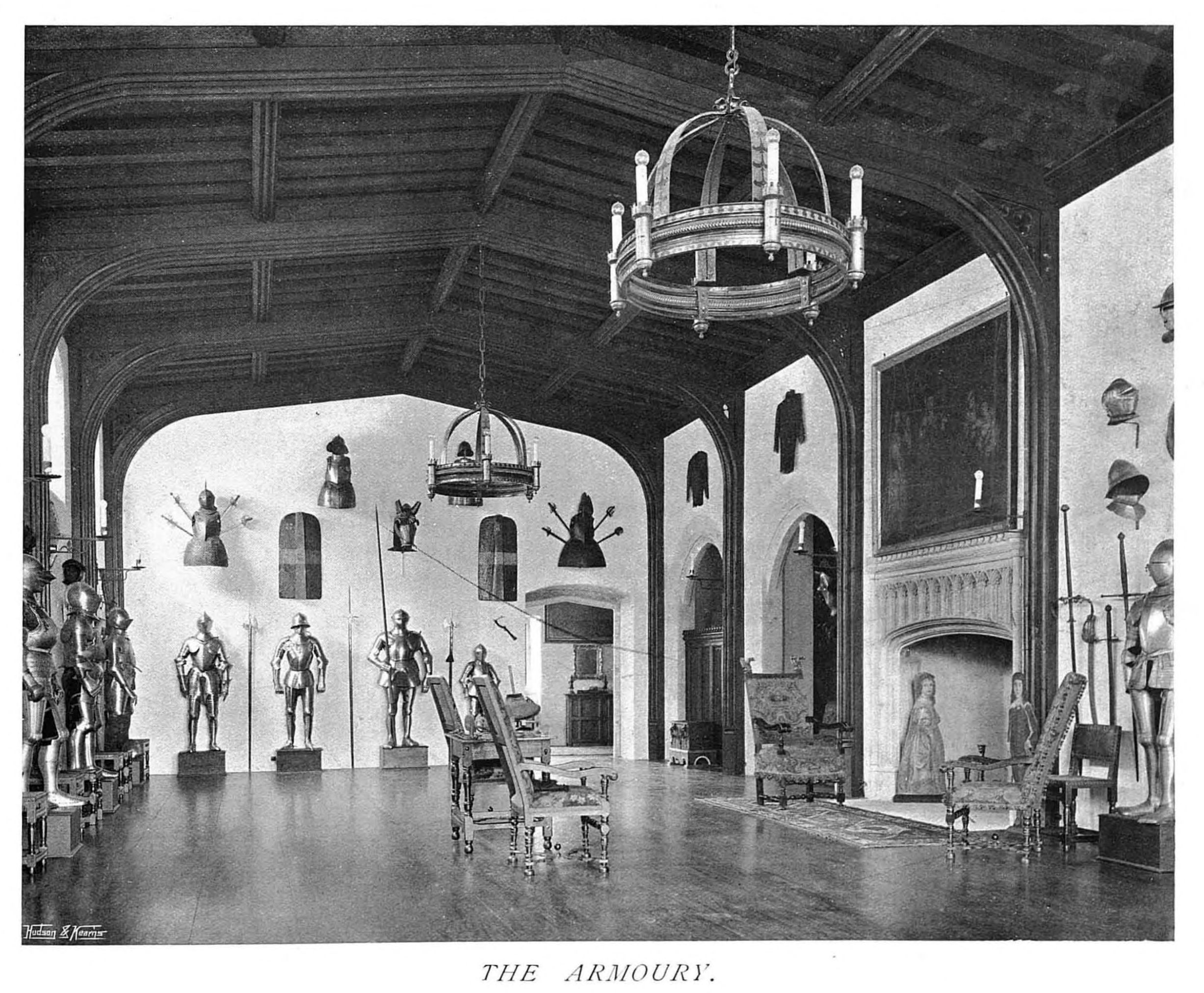
The armoury at St Donat's Castle, photographed in 1907

Under the Tyrwhitts, the castle entered a long decline that lasted over one hundred years. J. M. W. Turner sketched the partly-ruinous castle in 1798. John Wesley is reputed to have preached to a crowd of five thousand people on the terraced lawns in 1777. Partial restoration was started by Dr John Whitlock Nicholl Carne, who claimed to be descended from the Stradlings, and bought the castle from the Tyrwhitt-Drake family in 1862. Carne's reconstructions have not generally been well-regarded; the historian of the castle Alan Hall described the work as being undertaken in an "unscholarly, inauthentic style". A more sympathetic, contemporaneous, account described Carne's efforts as "careful and scrupulous".

Morgan Williams, a colliery owner from Aberpergwm and the owner in the Edwardian period, from 1901 to 1909, (Note: The Welsh National Archive gives the date of purchase as 1899.) carried out extensive and careful restoration, employing the noted architects George Frederick Bodley and Thomas Garner. Williams's sensitive reconstructions were praised by Henry Avray Tipping, the writer, architect and garden designer. The architectural writer Michael Hall was also impressed, describing Bodley's drawing room as "Edwardian antiquarian taste at its most refined". The process of reconstruction was less harmonious, Williams and Garner rowed constantly and Garner ultimately resigned. Almost all of Bodley and Garner's work was eradicated in the "brutal" remodelling undertaken by William Randolph Hearst. Williams also assembled a collection of arms and armour which was housed at the castle, and made major improvements to the castle's setting, moving the village which previously stood close to the castle's walls to a new location outside of the gates and constructing three entrance lodges. In 1903, the novelist Violet Paget, writing under her pseudonym Vernon Lee, used the castle as the model for St Salvat's Castle in her Gothic novel Penelope Brandling: A Tale of the Welsh Coast in the Eighteenth Century. Godfrey Williams, Morgan's son, disliked St Donat's, by tradition on account of its being haunted although this is disputed, and in 1921, having first culled the herd of deer that his father had reintroduced to the park, put the castle up for sale. Its advertisement in The Times, dated 3 May 1921, described the castle as "a comfortable and liveable old-world home of the first importance". In 1922, it was bought, along with 123 acres (50 ha) of land, by Richard Pennoyer, an American diplomat married to the Dowager Countess of Shrewsbury. Pennoyer was to own St Donat's for less than three years.

=== William Randolph Hearst: 1925–1960 ===
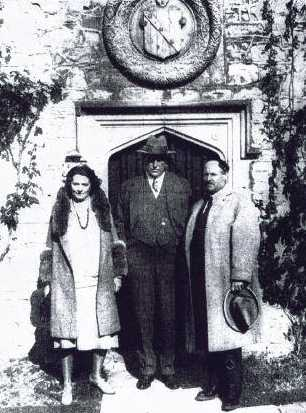
Randolph Hearst (centre) with Alice Head and Federico Beltrán Masses at St Donat's Castle in 1928

William Randolph Hearst inherited a mining and real estate fortune from his mother, and made a fortune of his own through the establishment of the Hearst Corporation, the largest newspaper and magazine company in the world. Part of the revenues were spent on the building of San Simeon, his Spanish-style castle in California, which began construction in 1919. By 1925 he was eager to purchase a genuine castle, and on 13 August he sent a wire to Alice Head, the London-based managing director of his European operations, "Want buy castle in England [sic]. St Donat's perhaps satisfactory at proper price. See if you can get right price on St Donat's or any other equally good." (Note: Hearst considered making an offer on Leeds Castle in Kent but was deterred by reports of its poor condition.) Within two months it was Hearst's, or specifically, the property of the National Magazine Company. The price paid for the castle and 111 acres (45 ha) of surrounding land was $130,000. Hearst employed Sir Charles Allom as his architect and designer. Allom was a noted decorator, the founder of White Allom and Company, and had been knighted in 1913 for his redecoration of Buckingham Palace.

Hearst attracted strong opinions. Theodore Roosevelt called him "an unspeakable blackguard (with) all the worst faults of the corrupt and dissolute monied man". Winston Churchill, who stayed as Hearst's guest at St Donat's and at San Simeon, described him in a letter to Clementine Churchill as "a grave simple child – with no doubt a nasty temper – playing with the most costly toys ... two magnificent establishments, two charming wives, complete indifference to public opinion, oriental hospitalities". Churchill's mention of "two charming wives" refers to Marion Davies, Hearst's long-time mistress and a constant presence at both San Simeon and St Donat's. P. G. Wodehouse, invited to San Simeon, recalled Hearst's way of dealing with over-staying guests: "The longer you are there, the further you get from the middle [of the refectory dining table]. I sat on Marion's right the first night, then found myself being edged further and further away till I got to the extreme end, when I thought it time to leave. Another day, and I should have been feeding on the floor."

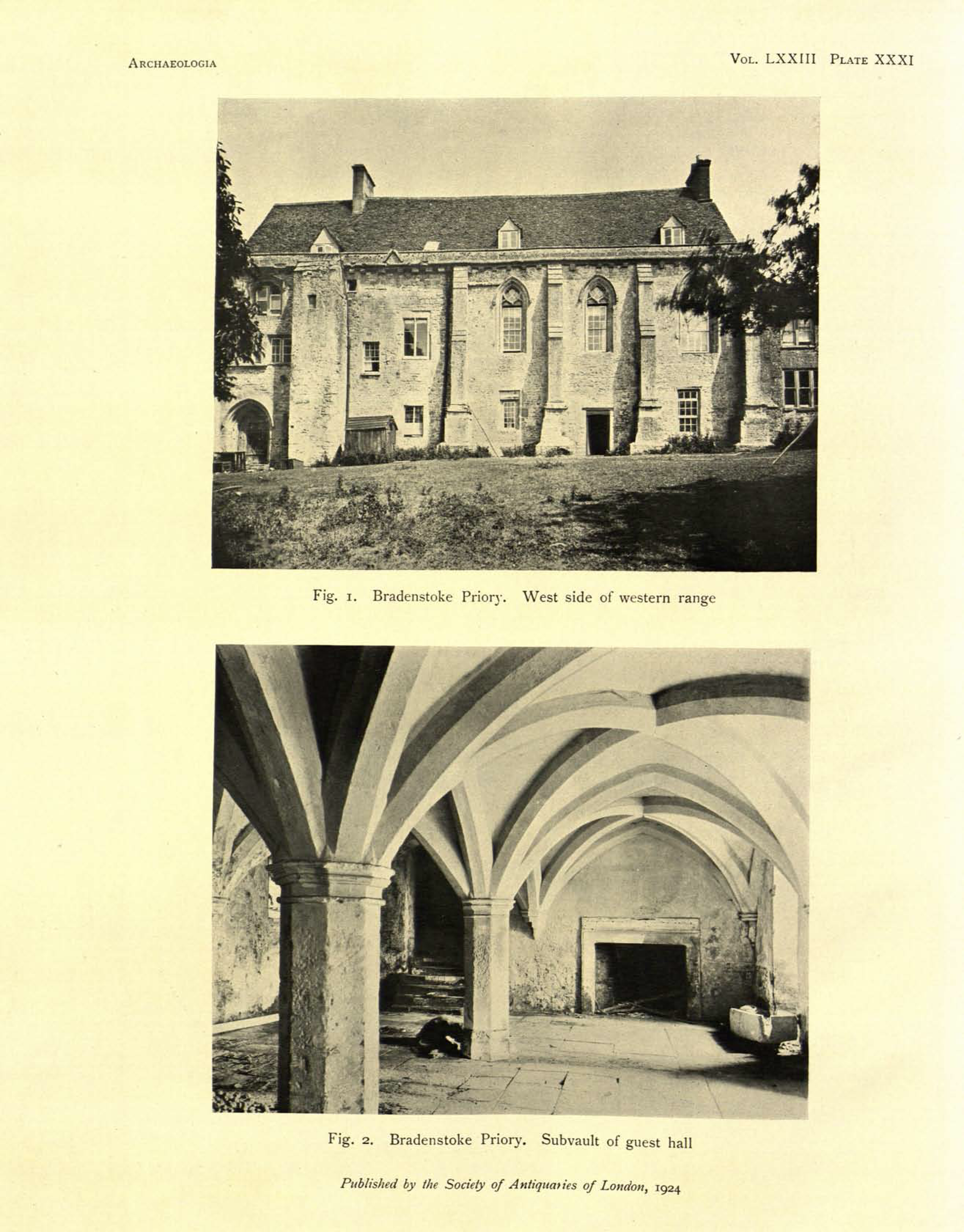
Bradenstoke Priory, portions of which were purchased by Hearst and incorporated into St Donat's Castle

Hearst undertook a "rapid and ruthless" redevelopment and rebuilding programme at St Donat’s. He spent around £250,000 on repairs, reconstruction, refurbishment, and furnishings between 1925 and 1937, renovating the castle with architectural trophies from across the United Kingdom and abroad; at the peak of his buying, Hearst's expenditure reportedly accounted for a quarter of the world's entire art market. Alice Head, manager of Hearst's London operations and the actual purchaser of St Donat's, recorded her exhilaration: "We were on top of the wave – out of (one) year's profits, we bought The Connoisseur, we bought St Donat's and we bought vast quantities of antiques." The writer Clive Aslet described Hearst's passion for antiquities as "naked obsession... romance gave way to rape", and his mania for collecting was satirised in Orson Welles's 1941 film Citizen Kane. Kane's palace Xanadu, modelled on San Simeon, is described as containing "A collection of everything, so big that it can never be catalogued or appraised. Enough for ten museums, the loot of the world." Hearst's actions were vigorously opposed, particularly in relation to the destruction of the Augustinian foundation Bradenstoke Priory in Wiltshire. Built in 1142, by the 20th century the priory was in poor repair. Hearst purchased the site in 1929, under conditions of secrecy, and had workmen take down the cloister, tithe barn, prior's lodging and refectory. Parts were shipped to California; major elements were incorporated into St Donat's as part of the newly created Bradenstoke Hall; while other pieces, including the tithe barn, were lost. (Note: Hearst's biographer David Nasaw refers to elements of the priory being discovered in crates in a Hearst Corporation warehouse in Los Angeles in 1960. These were subsequently sold to a hotelier in San Luis Obispo whose son is, as at 2018, planning to reconstruct them.) The Society for the Protection of Ancient Buildings ran a poster campaign on the London Underground, using text that was considered libellous and which had to be pasted over. The campaign also saw questions on the issue being raised in Parliament. Hearst was unconcerned, Miss Head responding to the SPAB secretary: "Mr Hearst and I are well aware of your views. You must please allow us to hold our own opinions."

Hearst did not visit until September 1928, and even then spent only one night in residence. Having undertaken a night-time tour of the castle which was illuminated by kerosene lamps, he left the following morning to board the Berengaria for New York. During the voyage home he wrote a 25-page memorandum with instructions for further improvements to the castle. Over the next decade his time at St Donat's amounted to some four months; between his purchase in 1925 and his death in 1951 he visited, normally for a month at the end of his summer European tours, in 1930, 1931, 1934 and, for the last time, in 1936. His infrequent visits were invariably undertaken with a large entourage, whom he sometimes took for drinks to the Old Swan Inn at the nearby village of Llantwit Major. (Note: Hearst's Fourth of July celebrations in 1934 included a fireworks display of such scale and extravagance that the coastguard complained it was confusing shipping in the Bristol Channel.) Among his guests were the actors Charlie Chaplin, Douglas Fairbanks, Errol Flynn and Clark Gable, in addition to politicians including Winston Churchill, David Lloyd George and a young John F. Kennedy, who visited with his parents, Joseph P. Kennedy Sr. and Rose Kennedy. Visiting writers included Elinor Glyn, Ivor Novello and Bernard Shaw. Of St Donat's, Shaw was quoted as saying: "This is what God would have built if he had had the money." (Note: The quote has also been recorded as Shaw's comment on Hearst Castle, Shaw having visited California in 1933.)

In the late 1930s Hearst's publishing empire came close to collapse. St Donat's was put up for sale in 1937, the Hearst Corporation noting that it had invested £280,000 in the castle through its subsidiary the National Magazine Company. An opinion on the chances of recouping this sum was sought from James Milner, a prominent solicitor and Deputy Speaker of the House of Commons. His response was not encouraging: "We have at St Donat's a white elephant of the rarest species." Billy Butlin, the holiday-camp entrepreneur, was uninterested and a development proposal by Sir Julian Hodge did not progress. Much of the furniture, silver and works of art were disposed of in a series of sales conducted by Christie's and Sotheby's which began in 1937 and continued for some years, with many items failing to achieve the prices Hearst had originally spent.

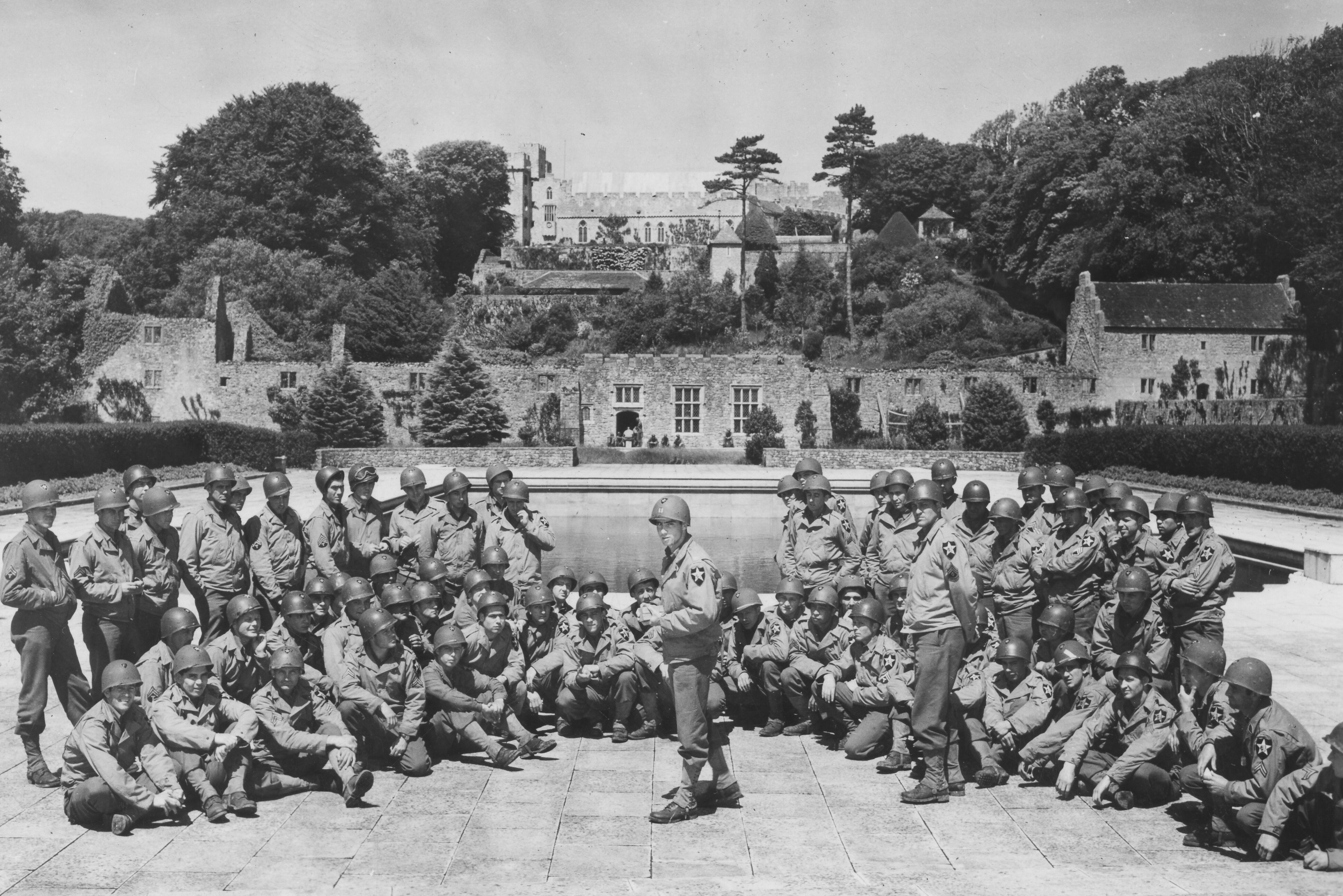
American soldiers in front of the pool on the seafront at St Donat's in 1944, with the castle and terraced grounds behind them.

During World War II, the castle was requisitioned by the War Office for use by British and American personnel for training purposes. In October 1939, the 2/5th Battalion of the British Army's Welch Regiment arrived at the castle; two years later, Auxiliary Territorial Service personnel were also stationed at the site. In 1944, it was used by the US 2nd Infantry Division as a command post, and Allied soldiers injured in the Normandy landings were treated and housed there. Hearst did not return after the war but continued to lend the castle to friends; Bob Hope, the comedian, stayed in May 1951 during his visit for a golf tournament at Porthcawl.

=== United World Colleges: 1960–present ===
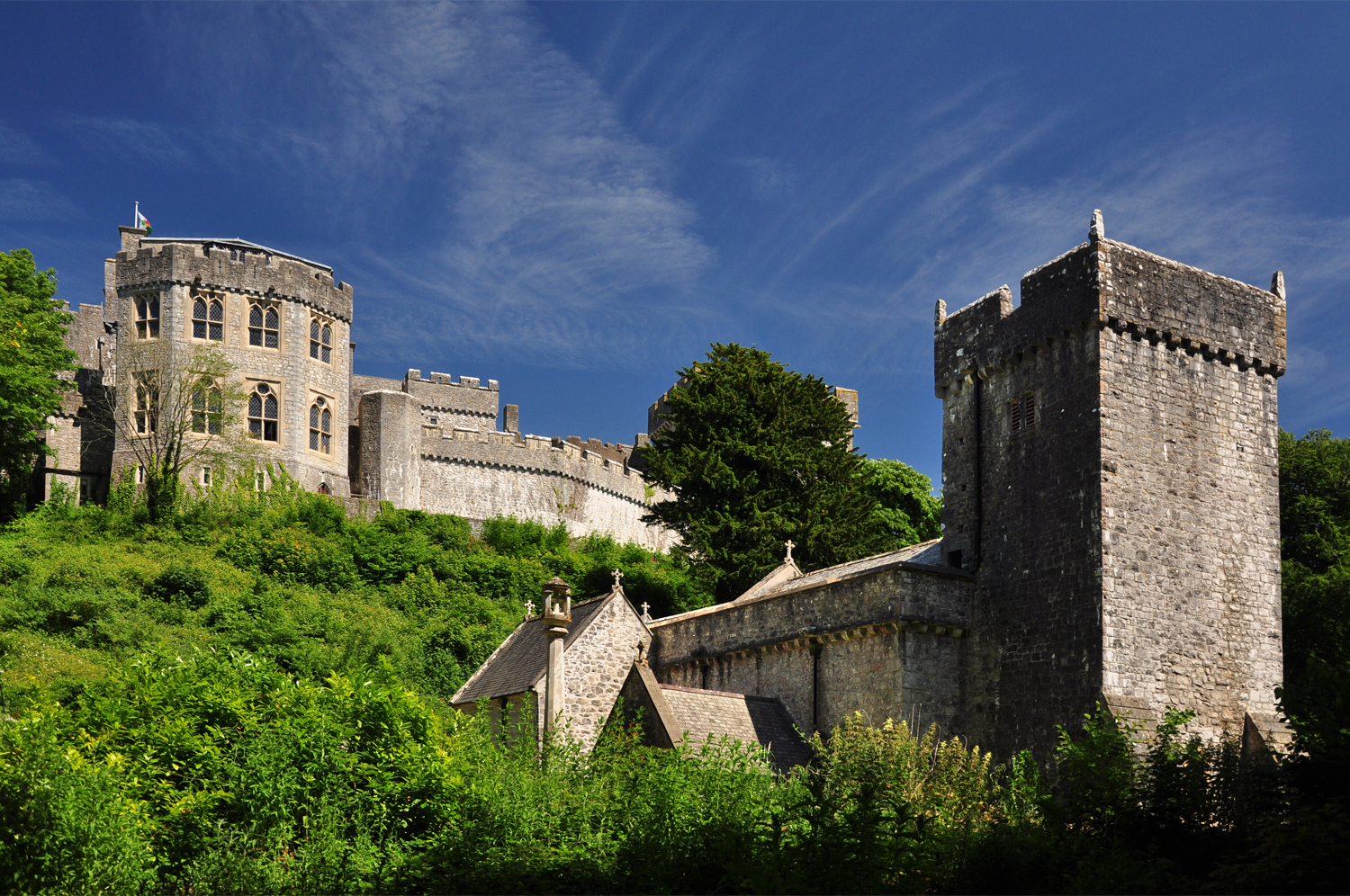
The castle seen from St Donat's Church, in 2010

Hearst died in August 1951. The castle remained on the market for the following decade until bought in 1960 by Antonin Besse II, son of the late Sir Antonin Besse, and donated to the founding council of Atlantic College, the first of what would become the United World Colleges. The idea for an international school arose from a meeting between the educationalist Kurt Hahn, who founded Schule Schloss Salem in Germany and Gordonstoun in Scotland, and Air Marshal Sir Lawrence Darvall, the commandant of the NATO Defense College. They conceived of a college for 16–19-year-old students drawn from a wide range of nationalities, with the aim of fostering international understanding. With Rear-Admiral Desmond Hoare, who would become the first headmaster, they persuaded Besse that the castle would make a suitable location for the first United World College, which opened in 1962 with fifty-six students.

The first rigid-hulled inflatable boat was invented, developed, and patented by Hoare at St Donat's in the 1960s. In an act of generosity, Hoare sold the patent for the boat's design to the Royal National Lifeboat Institution in 1973 for a notional £1; the RNLI's cheque was not cashed and remains at the castle. From 1963 until 2013 the castle's seafront facilities hosted an RNLI lifeboat station, which was staffed by students and faculty of the college, and was credited with saving ninety-eight lives along the South Wales coast during its period of operation.

The college has hosted several royal visitors at the castle, including Charles III, when Prince of Wales, and Princess Diana, Queen Elizabeth II and Prince Philip, Lord Mountbatten, who was closely involved with the UWC movement, Emperor Akihito and Empress Michiko of Japan and Queen Beatrix and Prince Claus of the Netherlands. The fiftieth anniversary of the college in 2012 was celebrated with a visit from Queen Noor of Jordan, the then President of the United World Colleges. Politicians such as the former prime minister of Canada Lester B. Pearson and the former Prime Minister of the United Kingdom Alec Douglas-Home also visited St Donat's, as have several ambassadors.

The college is home to approximately 350 students from more than 90 countries, who live in houses constructed on the castle grounds for the two years of their studies. With a history of occupation from its construction in the late 13th century, St Donat's has been described as the oldest continuously inhabited castle in Wales. (Note: John Newman suggests Cardiff Castle and Fonmon Castle as alternative claimants, but limits his scope to Glamorgan. The claim has also been made for Penhow Castle in Monmouthshire.)

== Architecture and description ==
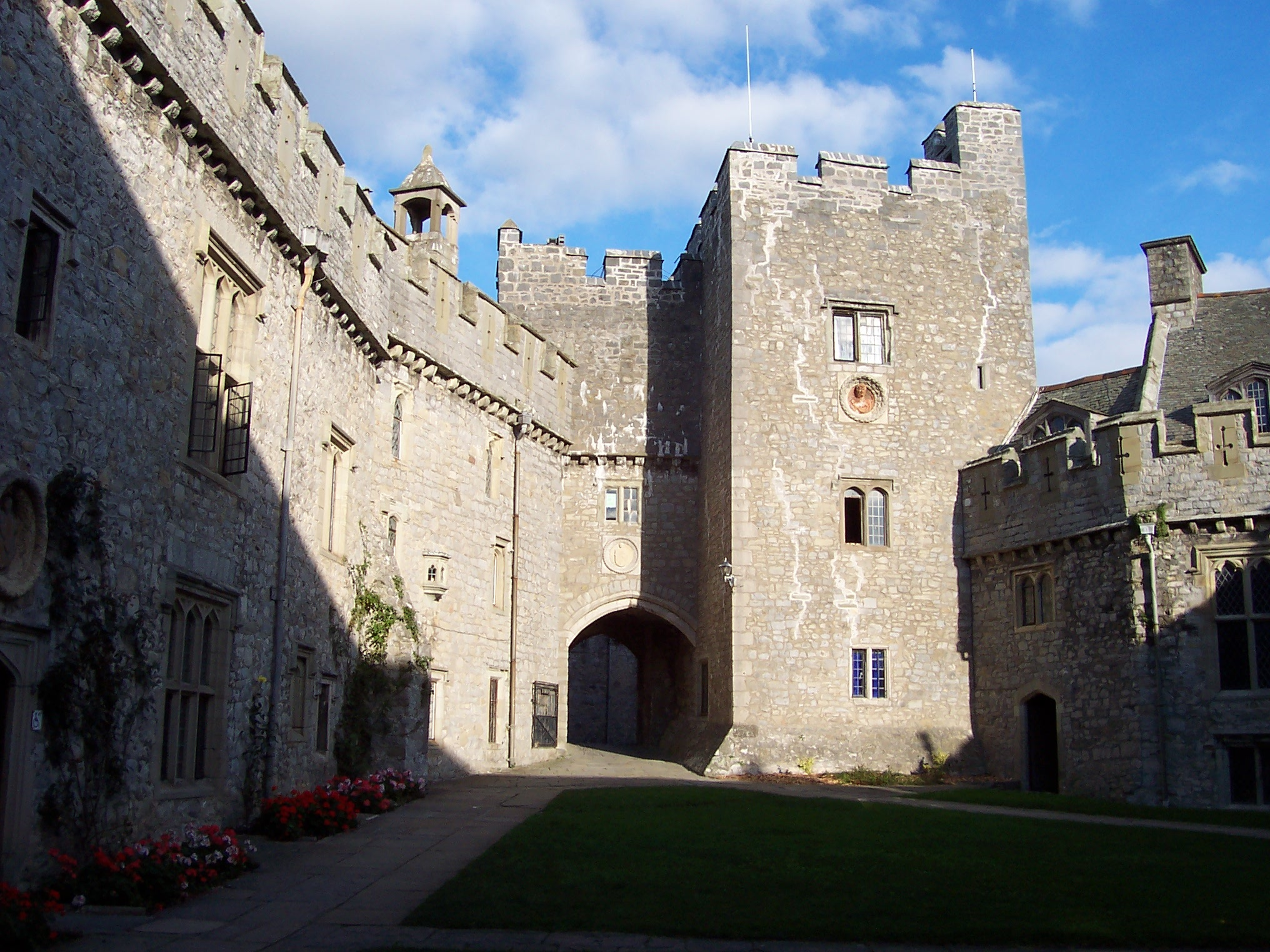
The outer courtyard, photographed in 2009

Detailed drawings and plans prepared by the engineer and antiquary George Thomas Clark in 1871, and subsequently by George Lambert in 1901, assisted the Royal Commission on the Ancient and Historical Monuments of Wales (RCAHMW) in their survey of the castle published in 2000. In this survey, RCAHMW described the development of the castle in six phases: Period 1, the late-12th century; Period 2, the early-14th century; Period 3, the late-15th century; Period 4, the early-16th century; Period 5, the late-16th or early-17th centuries and finally the restorations of Carne, Williams and Hearst. The survey identified "substantial" remnants of the original Norman enceinte, including the keep, which had been enveloped by later developments and had previously been unrecognised and unrecorded.

The entrance lies to the north-west. The grouping is surrounded by outer and inner curtain walls. The outer curtain wall is pierced by a gatehouse which leads through to an outer court. This is blocked, to the left, by Hearst's Bradenstoke Hall. A further gate, adjacent to the Mansell Tower, leads onto the inner court with the great hall to the south-west, the Bradenstoke Hall behind that, the banqueting hall to the west and the North Range to the right of the inner gatehouse.

=== Exterior ===
The castle site offers natural defences, in the form of steep slopes to two sides and the coast to a third. The unprotected side to the east is encircled by a deep dry moat. The castle is built of local lias limestone rubble with Sutton stone and sandstone dressings. The outer gatehouse is approached through modern battlements. The gatehouse has a portcullis room above, with an original fireplace of c. 1300 and a wooden portcullis with wooden doors behind. The first (outer) court beyond is the earliest part of the castle, constructed by the de Haweys in the late-12th century to replace a Norman timber fortification. The most recent RCAHMW survey, published in 2000, identified "significant vestiges" of the earliest stone castle which had been missed by earlier surveys. This discovery enabled a definitive dating for the first stone-built castle to "before 1200". The architectural historian John Newman draws comparisons with Newcastle at Bridgend and Coity Castle. To the sides of this gateway are a domestic range and the Brewhouse, the last major additions made by the Stradlings. The inner wall mostly survives and has a small original tower to the north, and a square gatehouse on the east beside the rectangular Mansell Tower, an enlargement of the original keep. In an article in The Archaeological Journal, C. P. Spurgeon notes the design similarities between the tower's door jambs and those in the chancel of St Donat's church, indicating an earlier construction date than that of the work undertaken by Peter de Stradling.

Through this gateway, a c. 40 metres (130 ft) wide inner court is positioned within a polygonal inner curtain wall. The curtain walls date from c. 1300, and were built by the founder of the Stradling family, or perhaps by his widow's second husband. The north-west range dates from the early-16th century; the north-east range is of the late-15th century as is the great hall on the south side of the court. The double-height bay windows date from Bodley and Garner's remodelling for Morgan Williams. Alan Hall describes the inner court as having a "peaceful and domestic" appearance having been constructed in the more settled Tudor period under the later Stradlings.

The exterior walls of the inner ward are decorated with a set of terracotta medallions or busts. The writer Simon Jenkins suggests it is unclear whether they are original to the castle or imported from elsewhere, although the architectural historian John Newman records that they were in situ by 1804. They appear to be modelled on the busts of the emperors by Giovanni da Maiano at Hampton Court. There are differing views as to the provenance of the medallions. Cadw is certain that two, those said to depict Marcus Aurelius and Cleopatra, are by da Maiano and were originally part of the Hampton Court set. It also suggests they could have been installed as early as the 16th century. Alan Hall agrees, noting the close connection between Cardinal Wolsey, to whom Pope Leo X had presented them, and Sir Thomas Arundell, father-in-law of the fourth Sir Edward Stradling. Newman is less definitive, although he notes their varying quality and suggests that further investigation should be undertaken.

Beside the hall, between the inner and outer curtain walls, is the Bradenstoke Hall, consisting of the inner curtain wall on the north side and the realigned outer curtain wall on the south, with a modern wall on the east end built at that point to fit in an early-14th-century roof, brought from Bradenstoke Priory in Wiltshire. The western range has largely been replaced by a larger, three-storey building which necessitated, when erected, the demolition of the western part of the outer curtain wall. All of this renewal was undertaken by Hearst to achieve larger spaces for entertaining. The historian Adrian Pettifer records St Donat's as the last inhabited castle in Wales to undergo major alteration, describing that Hearst "aggrandised it with plunder".

=== Interior ===
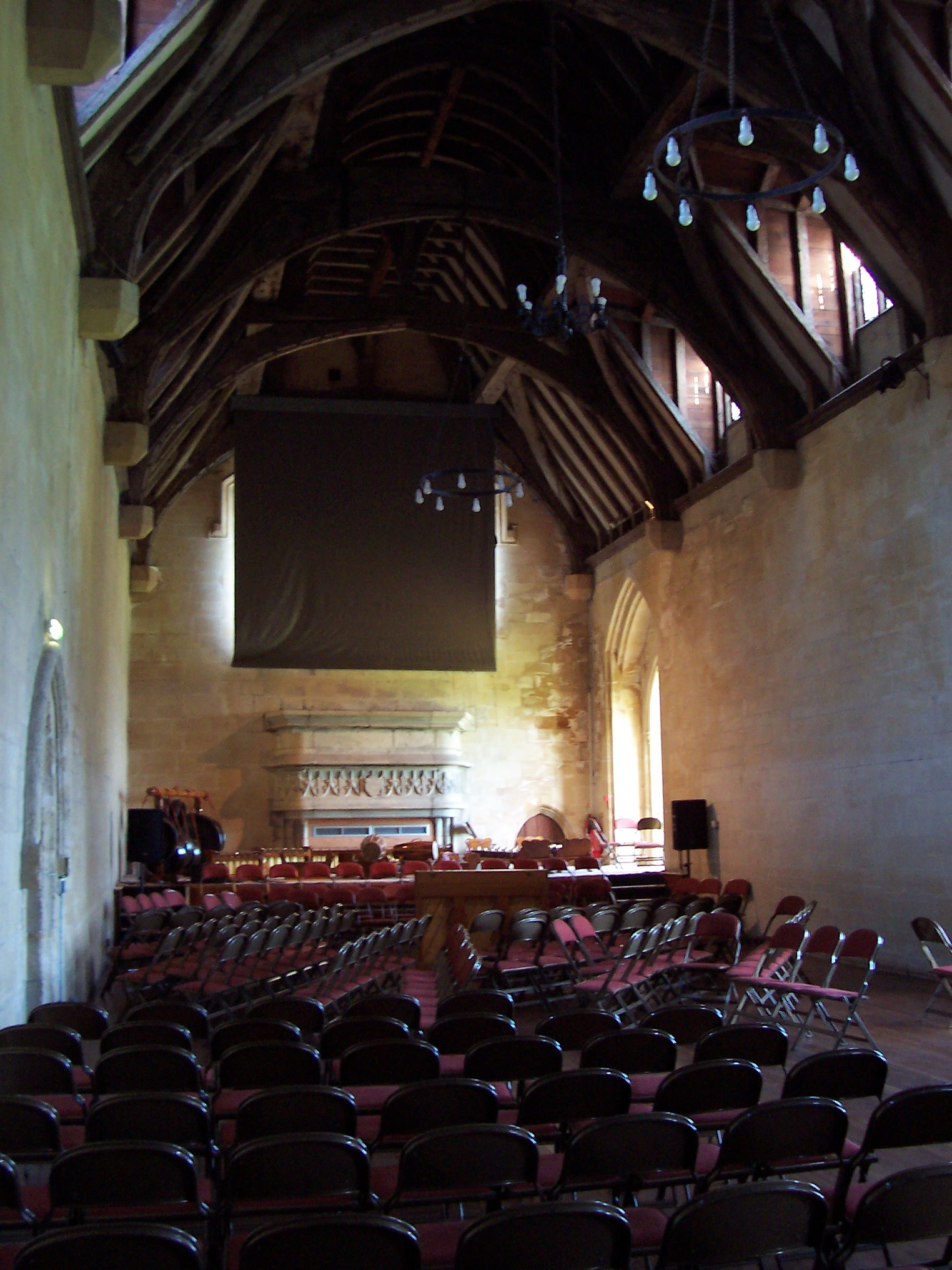
The roof of Bradenstoke Priory inserted into Hearst's Bradenstoke Hall

The historian Anthony Emery, in the second of his three-volume history, Greater Medieval Houses of England and Wales, 1300–1500, describes the interiors created by Hearst and Allom at St Donat's as "spectacular...surpassing all other work there in size and richness". (Note: Emery’s compliment was double-edged. His footnote on Hearst’s work at St. Donat’s describes the castle as “a bravura ensemble that displays panache and antiquarian immorality in equal measure”.) Their joint creation, the Bradenstoke Hall, contains two large fireplaces of French origin as well as the eponymous, imported roof. The banqueting hall, on the ground floor of the west range, is another example of Hearst's indiscriminate use of architectural salvage. The roof is 15th-century, probably Flemish and was acquired from St Botolph's Church, Boston, Lincolnshire. It has coloured ceiling bosses depicting a wide array of subjects, including flowers, griffins, the beasts of the Apostles and a head of Christ. The fireplace, cut to fit and with jambs from a different piece, is from a château in Beauvais. The entrance screen is from a Devon church. Hearst's breakfast room, off the banqueting hall, reuses another piece of the St Botolph's ceiling, as well as a fireplace from the prior's lodgings at Bradenstoke. The library above contains a major example of linenfold panelling, the Ellenhall Wainscot. Originally from a Staffordshire manor house, the panelling was sold to a dealer by the Earl of Lichfield in 1918 and subsequently acquired by Hearst. The Lady Anne Tower on the south-western corner is a Hearst/Allom reconstruction of the original 16th-century tower. The north range interior was remodelled in the late 1920s and contains Hearst's and Davies's bedroom suites, with an interconnecting door concealed in the panelling of Hearst's room. The panelling of Hearst's bedroom is original, but not to its current location. Allom salvaged it from the Stradling's Red Parlour, which Hearst demolished. Alan Hall notes the similarity of the panelling to that in the Senior Common Room at Jesus College, Oxford, a foundation attended and supported by members of the Welsh gentry, including the Stradlings.

Above the banqueting hall, Hearst created an armoury filled with a notable collection of arms and armour, mainly sourced by the dealer, Raymond Bartel, whom Hearst enticed from the New York Metropolitan Museum of Art. The collection, sold after Hearst's death, was at the time "one of the finest in the world", mainly bought at German auctions in the 1920s and 1930s and including a set of plate armour from Milan considered the earliest near-complete set in existence. (Note: Much of the collection is now in the possession of the British Museum and the Royal Armouries as well as the Carl Otto Kretzschmar von Kienbusch Collection of the Philadelphia Museum of Art.) In addition to the armour, Hearst assembled a considerable collection of art and antiquities at the castle; "must buy many things for St Donat's"; including a large number of 17th and 18th century English portraits, Classical Greek vases, and tapestries.

The castle was designated a Grade I listed building, the highest possible grade reserved for buildings of exceptional interest, in 1952. Cadw's listing report describes St Donat's as "an exceptionally fine medieval castle (with) many important interiors".

=== St Donat's Arts Centre and other college buildings ===
St Donat's Arts Centre is housed in a tithe barn of medieval origin but predominantly 16th-century in construction. The barn has been converted to a professionally equipped theatre which runs a programme of cinema, exhibitions and festivals. The Glass House is a modern addition and has been described as "aggressively detailed" but offering "spectacular" views. John Newman considered that the other developments undertaken by the college, although to designs of "uncompromising modernity", neither "detract from the historic castle (nor) impinge on its setting".

=== Gardens and grounds ===
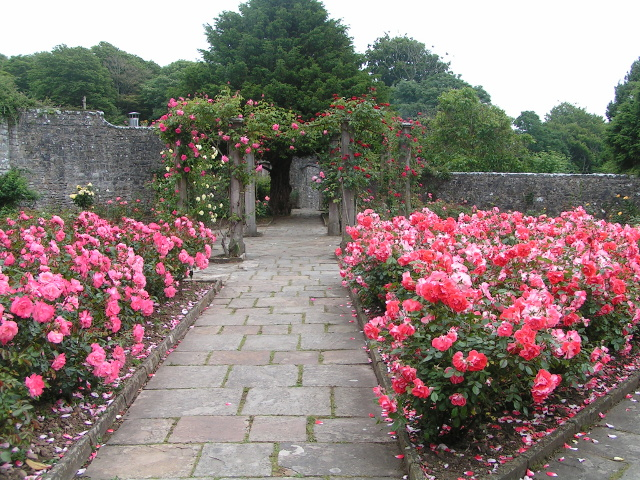
Rose garden at St Donat's Castle

The original gardens of the Stradlings were famous, begun in the Tudor period by Sir Thomas Stradling. They were extended by his son, Sir Edward Stradling, after a long sojourn in Rome. The Tudor Stradlings also maintained two deer parks on the wider estate, one for red and one for fallow deer. The Welsh poet Thomas Leyson, a friend of Sir Edward, composed a tribute in Latin, suggesting that the beauty of the gardens was sufficient to encourage visits from the sea-god Neptune and the water-nymph Thetis. (Note: Thomas Leyson's poem, now known only in a Welsh translation, runs, "Neptune and Thetis the sea-goddess and other creatures of the underworld give up the deep to dwell in the garden" (lines 83–85).) The gardens descend in a series of terraces to the sea and give 14-mile (23 km) distant views across the Bristol Channel towards Devon and Somerset.

Later development in the early 20th century by Morgan Williams saw the establishment of a Tudor-style garden with carved heraldic beasts on pedestals. This was followed by additions by Hearst, including a number of garden structures, such as an Italianate summerhouse overlooking the Rose Garden in which he installed a telephone exchange with connections to New York and California. Hearst built a 150 feet (46 m) long outdoor swimming pool on the lowest terrace, on the site of the castle's medieval tilt-yard. The pool was designed by Allom, assisted by Julia Morgan, Hearst's main architect for San Simeon. (Note: In August 1929, Hearst wrote to Morgan: "Please send Sir Charles Allom full details of Wyntoon pool sketch, including tile samples, to have a similar pool at St Donat's".) Beyond the pool site are the Cavalry Barracks. Newman dates these as 17th-century, but both Alan Hall and Cadw suggest a slightly earlier dating, in the 16th century, as a response to the threat of Spanish invasion. They were certainly converted to stabling, from whence the name derives, in the 17th century, and the Stradlings kept their horses at the barracks during the Civil War. By the 20th century the barracks were in a ruinous state and Hearst converted them into guest accommodation and a pool house in the 1930s. Between 1978 and 1981 Atlantic College rebuilt them in the original 17th-century style to serve as student accommodation. The college installed an indoor swimming pool and replaced the Allom/Morgan outdoor pool. Beyond the barracks, the castellated sea walls and towers have their origins in the 16th century, but were completely reconstructed by Hearst in the 1920s. The watchtower on the opposite slope to the castle is also probably 16th-century, or possibly late-15th-century, and is shown in a state of completion in a view of the castle dated 1740. It decayed thereafter, was restored in the late-19th century, but is again derelict in the early 21st century. It was almost certainly intended as a seaward look-out.

Structural elements of the gardens were given Grade I listed status in 1963, Cadw's listing report noting their "exceptional interest as a surviving 16th-century terraced garden". Many of the individual buildings have their own Grade II listings including the watchtower to the west of the castle, the sea walls and towers to the south of the castle, at the end of the terraces, the Cavalry Barracks, the lawn sundial, and the walls to the north and west of the castle entrance. The gardens themselves were given Grade I listing on the Cadw/ICOMOS Register of Parks and Gardens of Special Historic Interest in Wales in 2022. They remain a rare survival of a complete, terraced Tudor garden, once among the finest Renaissance gardens in Wales.

== Sources ==
- Aslet, Clive (1982). The Last Country Houses. New Haven, US and London: Yale University Press. ISBN 9780300029048.
- Aslet, Clive (2013). An Exuberant Catalogue of Dreams. London: Aurum Press. ISBN 9781781310946. OCLC 840477309.
- Boutelle, Sarah Holmes (1995). Julia Morgan: Architect. New York, London: Abbeville Press. ISBN 9780789200198. OCLC 748686754.
- Burke, John; Burke, Bernard (1844). A Genealogical and Heraldic History of the Extinct and Dormant Baronetcies of England, Ireland, and Scotland. London: John Russell Smith. OCLC 989886535.
- Clark, George Thomas (1871). Thirteen views of the Castle of St. Donat's, Glamorganshire. Shrewsbury, UK: Adnitt & Naunton. OCLC 1062140862.
- Davies, Marion (1990). The Times We Had (The Publishing Czar and the Hollywood Star: Life with William Randolph Hearst). New York: Ballantine Books. ISBN 0-345-32739-X.
- Denning, Roy; Hilling, John B.; Williams, Glanmor; Jones, Howard C.; Sutcliffe, David (1983). The Story of St. Donat's Castle and Atlantic College. Cowbridge, UK: D. Brown & Sons. ISBN 9780905928265. OCLC 60000424.
- Emery, Anthony (2000). Greater Medieval Houses of England and Wales. Vol. 2: East Anglia, Central England and Wales. Cambridge: Cambridge University Press. ISBN 9780521581318.
- Gilbert, Martin (1976). Winston S. Churchill 1922–1939. Authorised biography of Winston S. Churchill. Vol. V. London: Heinemann. ISBN 9780434130115. OCLC 715481469.
- Hall, Alan (2013). St Donat's Castle – a guide and brief history. Glamorgan, Wales: Atlantic College. OCLC 5991711.
- Hall, Michael (2015). George Frederick Bodley and the later Gothic Revival in Britain and America. New Haven, US and London: Yale University Press. ISBN 9780300208023. OCLC 983761471.
- Harris, John (2007). Moving Rooms: The Trade in Architectural Salvages. New Haven, US and London: Yale University Press. ISBN 9780300124200.
- Hopkins, Lisa (1998). Michele Marrapodi; A. J. Hoenselaars (eds.). The Italian World of English Renaissance Drama: Cultural Exchange and Intertextuality. Wilmington: University of Delaware Press. ISBN 9780874136388.
- Jenkins, Philip (2002). The Making of a Ruling Class: The Glamorgan Gentry 1640-1790. Cambridge: Cambridge University Press. ISBN 9780521521949.
- Jenkins, Simon (2008). Wales: Churches, Houses, Castles. London: Penguin Books. ISBN 9780713998931.
- Kastner, Victoria (2000). Hearst Castle: the biography of a country house. New York: Abrams Books. ISBN 9780810934153. OCLC 925187626.
- Kastner, Victoria (2009). Hearst's San Simeon: The Gardens and the Land. New York: Abrams Books. ISBN 9780810972902.
- Langmead, Donald (2009). Icons of American Architecture (PDF). Westport, US and London: Greenwood Publishing Group. ISBN 9780313342073. Archived from the original (PDF) on 25 March 2018.
- Levkoff, Mary L. (2008). Hearst the Collector. New York: Abrams Books. ISBN 9780810972834. OCLC 468957156.
- McCann, Nick (2002). Leeds Castle. Derby, UK: Heritage House Group. ISBN 9780851013749. OCLC 51669357.
- McMurry, Enfys (1999). Hearst's Other Castle. Bridgend, Wales: Seren Press. ISBN 9781854112286. OCLC 41396927.
- de Moubray, Amicia (2013). Twentieth Century Castles In Britain. London: Frances Lincoln Publishers. ISBN 9780711231788.
- Murray, Ken (1995). The Golden Days Of San Simeon. Los Angeles: Murmar Publishing. ISBN 9780385046329.
- Nasaw, David (2001). The Chief: The Life of William Randolph Hearst. Boston: Houghton Mifflin Harcourt. ISBN 9780618154463.
- Newman, John (1995). Glamorgan. The Buildings of Wales. London: Penguin Books. ISBN 9780140710564. OCLC 231881843.
- Nicholas, Thomas (1872). Annals and Antiquities of the Counties and County Families of Wales: containing a record of all ranks of the gentry, their lineage, alliances, appointments, armorial ensigns, and residences, with many ancient pedigrees and memorials of old and extinct families. London: Longman. OCLC 63508328.
- Pettifer, Adrian (2000). Welsh Castles: A Guide by Counties. Woodbridge, Suffolk: Boydell Press. ISBN 978-0-85115-778-8.
- Procter, Ben (2007). William Randolph Hearst: The Later Years, 1911-1951. Oxford: Oxford University Press. ISBN 9780199830794. "st donats castle charles allom."
- Risso-Gill, Christopher (2014). Routines and orgies: the life of Peter Cundill, financial genius, philosopher, and philanthropist. Montreal [Quebec]. pp. 148–149. ISBN 978-0-7735-9687-0. OCLC 1078872037.
- Royal Commission on the Ancient and Historical Monuments in Wales (2000). An Inventory of the Ancient Monuments in Glamorgan: Volume III – Part 1b: Medieval Secular Monuments the Later Castles from 1217 to the present. Cardiff, UK: RCAHMW. ISBN 9781871184228.
- Salter, Mike (2002). Castles of Gwent, Glamorgan and Gower. Malvern, UK: Folly Publications. ISBN 9781871731613. OCLC 54947157.
- Spurgeon, C. P. (1993). "St Donat's Castle – A recent revised interpretation by the RCAHMW". The Archaeological Journal. 150. London: Royal Archaeological Institute. ISBN 9781154195569. OCLC 933813883.
- Sutcliffe, David (2010). The RIB: The Rigid-Hulled Inflatable Lifeboat and Its Place of Birth the Atlantic College. London: Granta Editions. ISBN 9781857571011.
- Tinniswood, Adrian (2016). The Long Weekend: Life in the English Country House Between the Wars. London: Jonathan Cape. ISBN 9781448191246.
- Venning, Timothy (2017). Kingmakers: How Power in England Was Won and Lost on the Welsh Frontier. Stroud, UK: Amberley Publishing. ISBN 9781445659411.
- Wallace, Diana (2013). Female Gothic Histories: Gender, History and the Gothic. Cardiff: University of Wales Press. ISBN 9780708325742. OCLC 809911124.
- Walsham, Alexandra (2016). Catholic Reformation in Protestant Britain. London: Routledge. ISBN 9781317169246.
- Whittle, Elisabeth (1992). The Historic Gardens of Wales. Cardiff: CADW. ISBN 9780117015784. OCLC 611958059.
- Wodehouse, P. G. (1953). Performing Flea: A Self-Portrait in Letters. London: Herbert Jenkins. OCLC 504795043.
- Wood, Margaret (1965). The English Medieval House. London: Random House. ISBN 9781858911670. OCLC 489870387.
