= Alice Head =

English journalist and businesswoman

Alice Maud Head
- 1924 editor of Good Housekeeping
- Born: 3 May 1886; Notting Hill, England
- Died: 25 July 1981 (aged 95); Kensington, England

Alice Maud Head (3 May 1886 – 25 July 1981) was an English journalist and businesswoman. She was said to be the highest paid woman when she was editing Good Housekeeping and being William Randolph Hearst's European head.

== Life ==
Head was born to very strict parents in Notting Hill in 1886. She was educated at North London Collegiate School for Girls and her mother took her to get a job as a typist on the magazine Country Life. Employed to type, she was allowed to write short articles which fell in with her ambition to be a journalist. By the age of 22 George Riddell made her the editor of Woman at Home. In 1917 she was offered a salary of £10 a week to become the editor of Nash's Magazine for William Randolph Hearst organisation.

Head was chosen to create a version of the American Good Housekeeping magazine for the British market. Head created a number of dummy issues before she felt it was ready. In 1923 she became the assistant editor of the magazine.

Head was thrust into notability when William Randolph Hearst decided to promote Head to be the managing director of Good Housekeeping. He had never met her. She was allegedly the highest paid woman in Europe. She would deputise for Hearst making decisions on his behalf about not just editing but also buying for him St Donat's Castle, expensive art objects and three giraffes for his zoo. Head remained in charge until 1939. In 1939 she wrote her autobiography It Could Never Have Happened.

By 1941 the Hearst empire had peaked and took a new job editing Homes and Gardens. The following year she was a director of Country Life magazine. These jobs took her to her retirement in 1949. Head died at her flat in Kensington in 1981.
