= William Bassett (died 1586) =

Member of the Parliament of England

- Born: 1507; Beaupré
- Died: 10 March 1586 (aged 78–79)
- Occupation: Parliamentarian

William Bassett (1507 – 10 March 1586) was an Anglo-Welsh gentleman and parliamentarian from Glamorgan, Wales.

== Life ==
William Bassett was born in 1507. His family had been settled in Glamorgan since the 13th century. He was the first son of William Bassett of Beaupré and Margaret Fleming, daughter of William Fleming of Flemingston. His grandfather was Jenkin Bassett. During the Protestant Reformation there was some hostility to the supposed curative powers of the springs of Buxton, supposed to derive from some spiritual agency. Bassett's father wrote from Langley to Lord Thomas Cromwell saying that he had sealed up the baths and wells and awaited instructions. The prohibition does not seem to have lasted long.

William married Catherine Mansell (died 1593), daughter of Sir Rice Mansel of Margam, from another parliamentary family. They had at least three sons and two daughters. William Bassett was a Justice of the Peace in Glamorgan from 1561 and Sheriff of Glamorgan in 1557–58 among other offices. He was Knight of the Shire in the 1563–67 and 1571 parliaments. He owned various properties in Glamorgan and Gloucestershire including the manors of Saint Hilary, Tregrove and Llantrithyd, and the advowsons of Penmark, Landore and Cardiff.

William Bassett died on 10 March 1586 aged 80, leaving most of his property to his eldest son Arnold Bassett. He left Beaupré to his widow. His wife, Katheryne, died on 10 March 1593 at the age of 80.

It is said that the bard Meurig Dafydd once presented a praise poem to Bassett. Bassett read the poem, confirmed that it was the only copy, paid the bard, rebuked him for his unsatisfactory work and threw the manuscript into the hall fire, saying, "By my honestie I swere yf there bee no copie of this extante, none shall there ever bee."

== Sources ==
- Hasler, P.W., ed. (1981), "BASSETT, William I (d.1586), of Beaupré, St. Hilary, Glam.", The History of Parliament: the House of Commons 1558–1603, Boydell and Brewer, The History of Parliament Trust
- Fox, Adam; Woolf, Daniel R. (2002), The Spoken Word: Oral Culture in Britain, 1500–1850, Manchester University Press, ISBN 978-0-7190-5747-2
- Ross, David (2016), "Old Beaupre Castle", Britain Express
- T. Bulmer & Co. (1895), History, Topography, and Directory of Derbyshire: Comprising Its History and Archaeology : a General View of Its Physical and Geological Features, with Separate Historical and Topographical Descriptions of Each Town, Parish, Manor, and Extra-parochial Liberty
- Traherne, John Montgomery (1840), Stradling Correspondence: A Series of Letters Written in the Reign of Queen Elizabeth, with Notices of the Family of Stradling of St. Donat's Castle, Co. Glamorgan, Longman, Orme, Brown, Green, and Longmans
- Tunstall, James (1847), Rambles about Bath, and its neighbourhood, Simpkin, Marshall
- Williams, William Retlaw (1895), The Parliamentary History of the Principality of Wales, from the Earliesr Times to the Present Day, 1541–1895: Comprising Lists of the Representatives, Chronologically Arranged Under Counties, with Biographical and Genealogical Notices of the Members, Together with Particulars of the Various Contested Elections, Double Returns and Petitions, Priv. print. for the author by E. Davis and Bell
