= Clark W. Bryan =

American publisher, writer, poet, and journalist

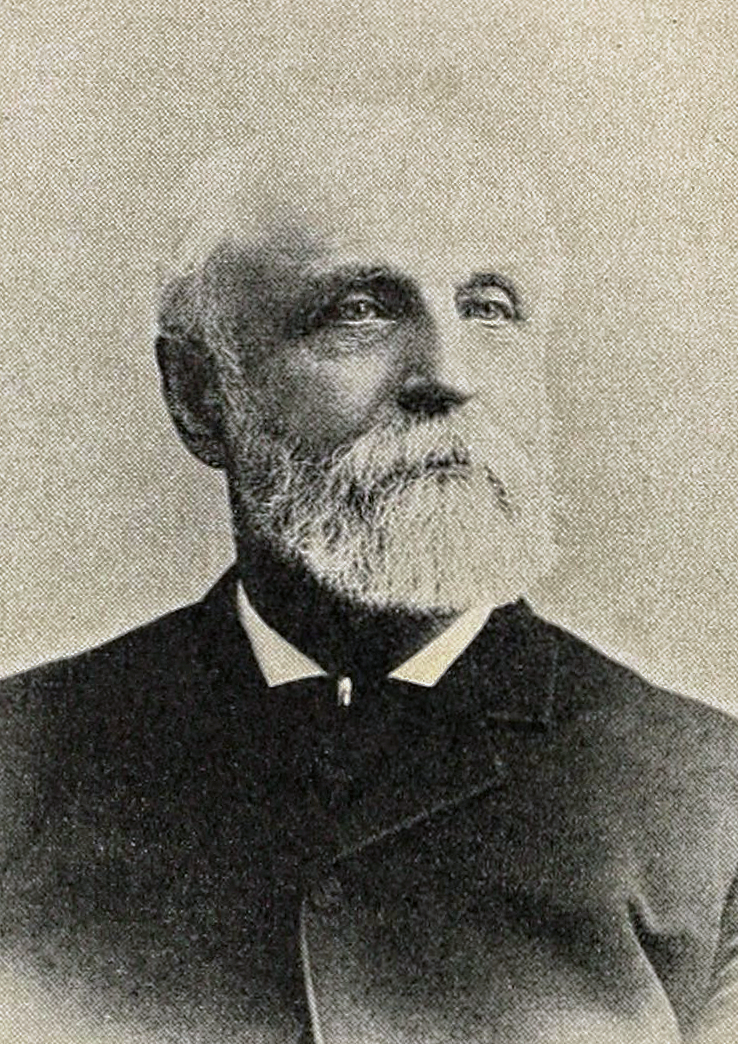
- Photographic portrait of Bryan, c. 1891
- Born: August 12, 1824; Harpersfield, New York, U.S.
- Died: January 23, 1899 (aged 74); Springfield, Massachusetts, U.S.
- Occupations: Journalist, publisher
- Children: 2

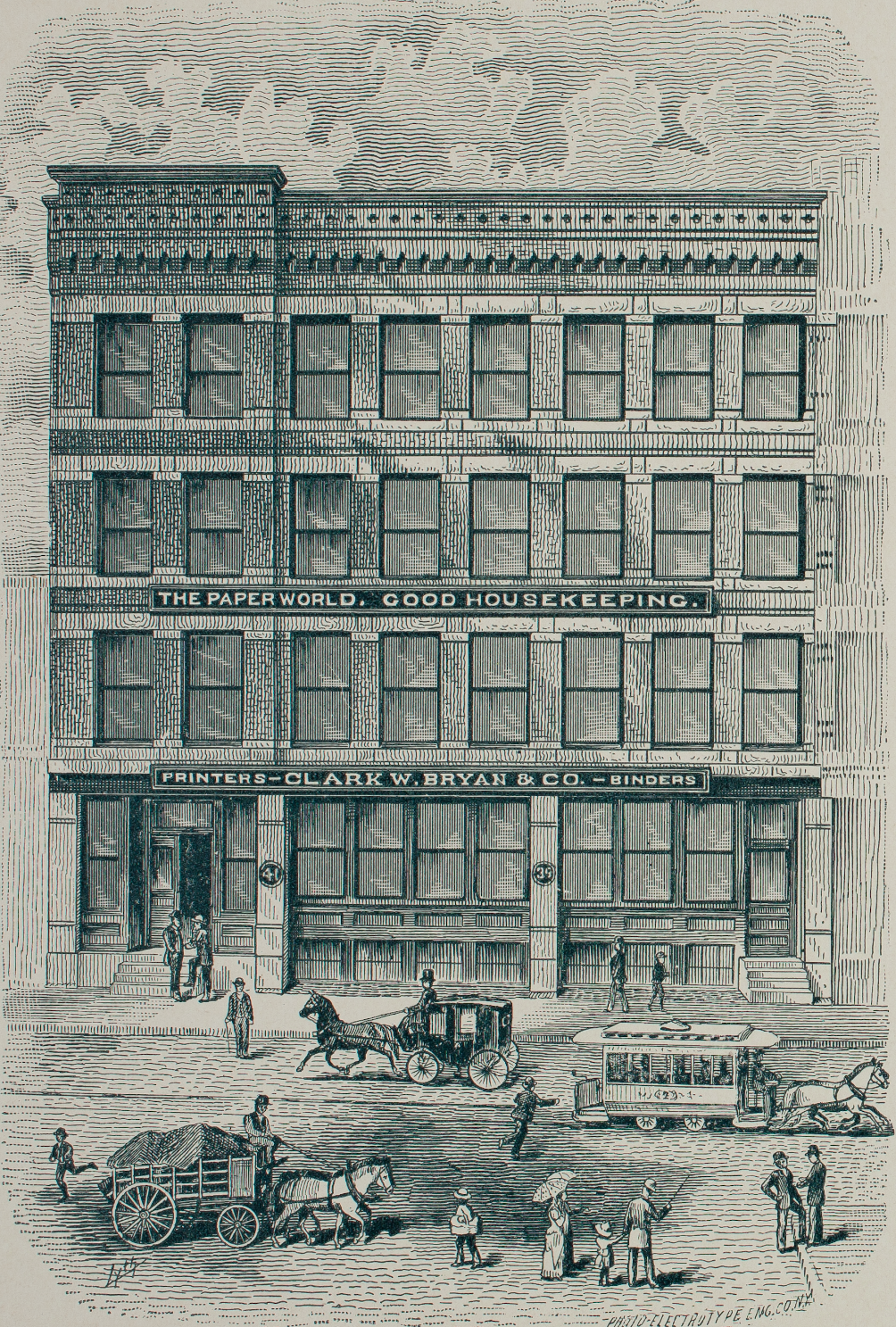
The offices of the publishing firm, Clark W. Bryan & Company, after it was moved from Holyoke to Springfield; the building still stands at 39–43 Lyman Street today

Clark W. Bryan (August 12, 1824 – January 23, 1899) was an American publisher, writer, poet, and journalist who is best known today for creating the home economics magazine Good Housekeeping, which he would manage from 1885 until his death in 1899, during which time he published more than a hundred of his own poems in its issues.

== Publishing career ==
Prior to this, Bryan was extensively involved in the reorganization of the Springfield Republican as editorial and business partner to Samuel Bowles, following the death of Bowles' father; Bryan entered the business in 1852, serving as partner in the paper's printing firm, Samuel Bowles and Co. Upon Bowles' dissolution of the partnership with himself and several other minor shareholders in his paper's printing business, Bryan went on to rechristen it the Clark W. Bryan & Co., which purchased and expanded the Springfield Union from 1872 to 1882, when it was sold to its editor-in-chief Joseph Shipley.

From 1880 until his death, Bryan was also responsible for a successful trade publication, The Paper World, which was published in various iterations in Holyoke, Springfield, and finally out of the Pulitzer Building in New York City. By the time the paper had been moved to the latter in 1898, Bryan retained little more than creative input, and this sale to a separate company would ultimately fail.

== Financial ruin and suicide ==
Bryan, who had lived to see his business empire in financial ruin and his wife and one of his sons pass in recent years, took his life on January 23, 1899, with a pistol. All of his publications were promptly discontinued, the sole exception being Good Housekeeping, which immediately found a purchaser, John Pettigrew, who would sell it to his printer George D. Chamberlain, who in turn sold it to E. H. Phelps, another former Springfield Republican associate, whose company, Phelps Publishing, had offices in Springfield and New York. Gradually reaching national prominence, it was purchased by the Hearst Corporation in 1911.

== Selected works ==
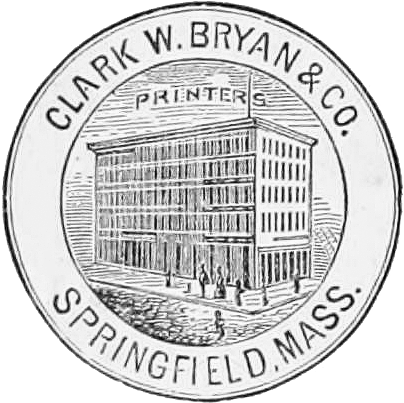
Logo of Clark W. Bryan & Co., printers

The following is a list of those works authored by Bryan himself; it does not include the many publications which his company would publish for which he had no editorial role:

=== Books ===
- Through the Housatonic Valley to the Hills and Homes of Berkshire (1882)
- Credit; Its Meaning and Moment (1883)
- Progress of American Journalism as Illustrated by the Reminiscences of Horace Greeley, and a Review of the New York Tribune (1885)
- The Book of Berkshire (1886)
- Carriage Driving in and near unto Western Massachusetts (1892)

=== Serial publications ===
- Springfield Union (owned and operated from 1872 to 1878)
- The Paper World (1880–1899)
- The Manufacturer and Industrial Gazette (c. 1881)
- Good Housekeeping (1885–1899)
- The Library Bulletin (1887–1898), published for Springfield City Library; often contained literary content by Bryan including excerpts from The Paper World and Good Housekeeping
- Amateur Gardening
