= Edward Stradling (1529–1609) =

English politician, antiquary, and literary patron

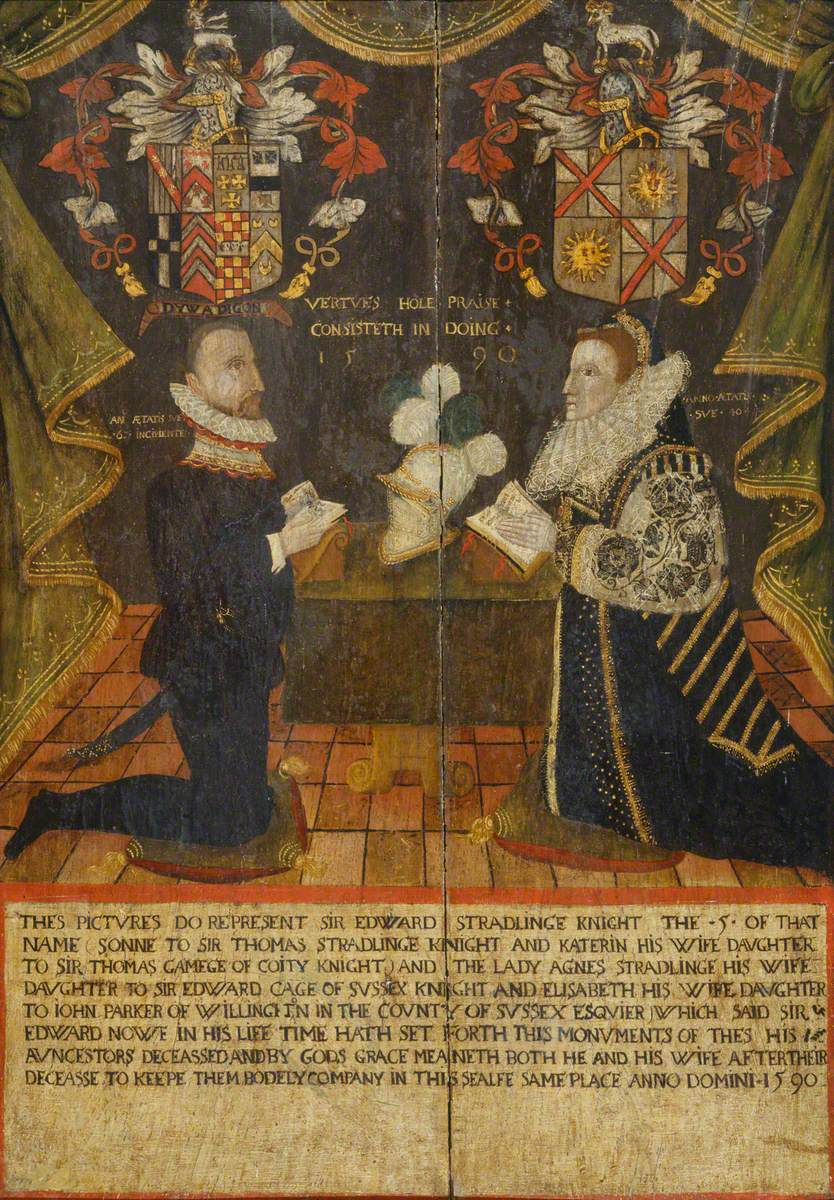

Sir Edward Stradling (1529–1609) was a Welsh politician, antiquary and literary patron.

== Life ==
The eldest son of Sir Thomas Stradling, he studied at the University of Oxford, but left without graduating, and travelled on the continent, spending some time at Rome. With an old family connection with the Arundels, he was elected in April 1554 Member of Parliament for Steyning, and in 1557–58 for Arundel. He succeeded to the estates in 1573, was knighted in 1575, was sheriff of Glamorganshire for 1573, 1581, and 1593, and was appointed in 1578 one of the county commissioners for the suppression of piracy. Stradling and three other Glamorganshire gentlemen were deputy lieutenants of Pembrokeshire from 1590 to 1595, at a time of disturbances there.

Stradling died without issue on 15 May 1609, leaving his estate to his adopted son and second cousin, Sir John Stradling, who had married his wife's niece. He was buried in the private chapel at St. Donat's Castle where his heir and his widow Agnes, second daughter of Sir Edward Gage of Hengrave, Suffolk, whom he had married in 1566, placed an inscription to his memory in the Lady Chapel of the castle. Agnes died 1 February 1624, and was buried in the same chapel.

== Works ==
Anthony Wood wrote of Stradling as a benefactor, antiquarian, manuscript collector, and owner of a library at St. Donat's. David Powel incorporated Stradling's The Winning of the Lordship of Glamorgan out of the Welshmen's Hands (1573) in his edition of Humphrey Llwyd's Historie of Cambria (London, 1584); and in the introduction Powel acknowledges Stradling's genealogical help. The "Winning" was circulated at court through Blanche Parry. Thomas Leyson was one of Stradling's associates.

Stradling is also mentioned by Lewys Dwnn among those who had written on the history or genealogies of the whole of Britain, a researcher in records kept by religious houses. The register of Neath Abbey was in Stradling's possession in 1574, but was later lost. In 1645–46 James Ussher spent almost a year at St. Donat's Castle, where he researched antiquarian matters that in 1686 had passed to Richard Parr.

== Legacy ==
Stradling bore the expense of the publication of John Dafydd Rhys's Welsh grammar Cambrobrytannicæ Linguæ Institutiones (London, 1592); Meurig Dafydd, a Glamorgan poet, addressed a cywydd to Stradling and Rhys on the publication of the grammar, and referred to the former as a master of seven languages. He also spent large sums on public improvements. To check the encroachments of the sea on the Glamorganshire coast he built in 1606 a sea-wall at Aberthaw which was destroyed by a storm a few months later. At Merthyrmawr he constructed an aqueduct and seems to have attempted a harbour at the mouth of the River Ogmore. He also had a vineyard on his estate. Death intervened before he had arranged the endowment of a school, but his intentions were carried out by his heir with the founding of Cowbridge Grammar School.

Letters addressed to Stradling by Francis Walsingham, Sir Henry Sidney, Oliver St John, 1st Baron St John of Bletso, and others were preserved as transcripts at Margam. They were published in 1840 as Stradling Correspondence, edited by John Montgomery Traherne.

== Notes ==
Attribution

This article incorporates text from a publication now in the public domain: Lee, Sidney, ed. (1898). "Stradling, Edward". Dictionary of National Biography. Vol. 55. London: Smith, Elder & Co.
