= Meurig Dafydd =

- Born: c. 1510; Llanishen, Wales
- Died: 1595
- Occupation: Bard

Meurig Dafydd (c. 1510–1595) was a Welsh bard, genealogist and historian, at one time one of the leading literary figures in Glamorgan. However, his poetry was formal and uninspired.

== Life ==
Meurig Dafydd was born at Llanishen near Cardiff around 1510. He studied under Lewys Morgannwg, a much livelier poet, and became a professional bard. He was a convinced Roman Catholic. He married Joan Mathau, granddaughter of Sir Christopher Mathew of Llandaff. For forty years he was the family bard of the Lewis family of Van, Caerphilly. He was also a genealogist and historian and acted as a "herehaut" to the Ludlow court. Meurig Dafydd periodically left the Lewis's to tour the houses of the gentlefolk of Glamorgan, Gwent and south Brecknock. He died in 1595.

== Work ==
In his day Meurig Dafydd was a leading literary figure in Glamorgan. However, his poetry was cold and conventional, composed in strict metres. It is said that he once presented a praise poem to William Bassett, lord of Old Beaupre Castle. Basset read the poem, confirmed that it was the only copy, paid the bard, rebuked him for his unsatisfactory work and threw the manuscript into the hall fire, saying, "By my honestie I swere yf there bee no copie of this extante, none shall there ever bee."

Edward Stradling (1528/29–1609) bore the expense of the publication of John Dafydd Rhys's Welsh grammar Cambrobrytannicæ Linguæ Institutiones (London, 1592). Meurig Dafydd addressed a cywydd to Stradling and Rhys on the publication of the grammar, and referred to the former as a master of seven languages. According to Iolo Morganwg he once said, "The Druid and the Domestic Poet are the same thing, and of the same kind of grade." This saying may well have been a fiction invented by Iolo. The bard and antiquary John Llywelyn of Llan Gewydd, near Bridgend, Glamorganshire studied under Meurig Dafydd and Thomas Llewelyn.

== Sources ==
- Fox, Adam; Woolf, Daniel R. (2002), The Spoken Word: Oral Culture in Britain, 1500–1850, Manchester University Press, ISBN 978-0-7190-5747-2
- Jones, Ffion Mair (1 July 2010), The Bard is a Very Singular Character': Iolo Morganwg, Marginalia and Print Culture, University of Wales Press, ISBN 978-0-7083-2296-3
- Lloyd, John Edward (1897). "Sion Llywelyn" . Dictionary of National Biography. Vol. 52. p. 316.
- Phillips, Thomas Oswald (1959), "DAFYDD, MEURIG", Dictionary of Welsh Biography, National Library of Wales
- Ross, David (2016), "Old Beaupre Castle", Britain Express
- Thomas, Daniel Lleufer (1898). "Stradling, Edward" . Dictionary of National Biography. Vol. 55. pp. 13–14.
