= John Stradling (priest) =

Archdeacon of Llandaff, Wales

John Stradling was Archdeacon of Llandaff from 1447 to 1454.

Church in Wales titles
| Preceded by Robert Cole | Archdeacon of Llandaff; 1447–1454 | Succeeded by Lewis Byford |
