= Sir Edward Stradling, 2nd Baronet =

English politician and Royalist officer

Sir Edward Stradling, 2nd Baronet (baptised 1600 – 20 June 1644) was an English businessman and politician who fought on the Royalist side during the English Civil War. He fought at the Battle of Edgehill, where he was captured and held prisoner for seven months. Released in May 1644, he travelled to Oxford, but died there of a fever the following month.

== Life ==
Edward Stradling was the eldest son of Sir John Stradling, 1st Baronet, and Elizabeth Gage. He was born in St Donats, Glamorgan, and according to his biography in the Oxford Dictionary of National Biography, was baptised at St Donat's Church on 9 November 1600, though in the Dictionary of Welsh Biography, he is listed as being born in 1601. He was educated at Brasenose College, Oxford. On the death of his father in 1637, he inherited the baronetcy.

Stradling was a keen businessman, and took undertakings in London water and in the soap industry. He married Mary, daughter of Sir Thomas Mansel of Margam, and they had a child Edward. Stradling was elected Member of Parliament for Glamorgan in the Short Parliament of 1640.

In 1642 during the First English Civil War, Stradling marched with troops from Glamorgan to join with Charles I at Shrewsbury. Stradling was a colonel of a regiment of foot at the Battle of Edgehill, a conflict in which he was taken prisoner. He was released in May the following year, but died of a fever at Oxford and was buried in Jesus College chapel on 21 June 1644.

== Bibliography ==
- Jones, Evan David (1959). "STRADLING family of Glamorganshire". Dictionary of Welsh Biography (online ed.). National Library of Wales.
- Bowen, Lloyd (2004). "Stradling, Sir Edward, second baronet". Oxford Dictionary of National Biography (online ed.). Oxford University Press. doi:10.1093/ref:odnb/26625. (Subscription or UK public library membership required.)

Baronetage of England
Preceded by John Stradling	Baronet (of St Donats); 1637–1644	Succeeded by Edward Stradling
