= Siôn Dafydd Rhys =

- Born: 1534; Llanfaethlu, Anglesey, Wales
- Died: c. 1609; Clun Hir, Brecknock, Wales
- Other names: Latin: Joannes David Rhaesus
- Occupations: Physician and grammarian
- Known for: Cambrobrytannicae Cymraecaeve linguae institutiones et rudimenta (1592)

Siôn Dafydd Rhys, in Latin Joannes David Rhaesus, also called John David Rhys, or John Davies (1534 – c. 1609), was a Welsh physician and grammarian. He wrote the first Welsh grammar in Latin (but not the first Welsh grammar at all, see Gruffydd Robert), published in 1592.

== Life ==
Siôn Dafydd Rhys was born in 1534 in Llanfaethlu, Anglesey. His family had modest means but traced its origins from uchelwyr, or minor nobility. The family legend was that his father, Dafydd Rhys, was son of Rhys Llwyd Brydydd of Glamorganshire. Dafydd Rhys came to Anglesey as gardener to Sir William Gruffydd of Penrhyn, who married Jane Stradling of St Donats, Glamorganshire. Dafydd married one of the bride's attendants. Siôn's parents died when he was young, and he was brought up at St Donats and educated with the Stradlings.

Rhys was a student at Christ Church, Oxford in December 1555, but left the university without graduating. He married Agnes Garbet, daughter of John Garbet of Hereford. They would have seven sons. He went on an extended tour of Europe, visiting Venice, Crete and Cyprus. His trip was perhaps in part because he was sympathetic to Catholicism. He attended the University of Siena. Following a two-day public examination, "Ioanes Dauit filius Domini Resi de Ciuitate Pangorio Anglus" was awarded the degree of Master of Arts and Doctor of Medicine in the great hall of the Archbishop of Siena by the Vicar, his deputy, on 2 July 1567. Rhys does not appear to have set up in practice as a doctor in Siena, since there is no trace of an application for citizenship, which would have been required. He taught for a period at a school in Pistoia. In Pistoia he was the private tutor of the sons of Vincenzo Gheri, who was from a family connected to the Medici.

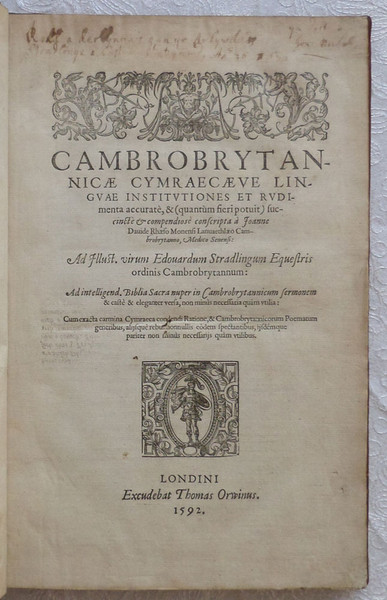
Title page of Rhys's Welsh grammar

Rhys returned to north Wales in the early 1570s and became headmaster of the Friars' Grammar School in Bangor. In 1577 he was invited by Bishop Richard Davies of St David's to join him at the episcopal palace near Carmarthen. Possibly the intent was for him to collaborate on translating the Old Testament into Welsh, but this did not transpire. He moved east to the Cardiff region in 1581. He had set up practise as a doctor in Cardiff by 1583. He later moved his practice to Blaen Cwm Llwch at the foot of the Brecon Beacons. In his later years he spent all his time working on his grammar of the Welsh language. Edward Stradling (1528/29–1609) bore the expense of the publication of Rhys's Welsh grammar in 1592. The bard Meurig Dafydd addressed a cywydd to Stradling and Rhys on the publication of the grammar.

Siôn Dafydd Rhys died around 1609 in Clun Hir, Brecknock. (Note: Some sources indicate that Rhys was still alive in 1617.) Wood asserts that Rhys died a Roman Catholic, but Prichard calls him "sinceræ religionis propagandæ avidissimus." His son, Walter Rhys, was vicar of Brecon from 1576 to 1621.

== Writings ==
While in Italy Rhys published De Italica Pronunciatione (Padua, 1569). This work gives a painstaking description of the articulation of vowels and consonants. It shows that Rhys was familiar with all the main languages of Europe. It was a pioneering work on the physiology of speech. While in Pistoia he wrote a Greek grammar, which has since been lost. He also published a Latin grammar at Venice, which was very successful in its day but seems to have also been lost.

Rhys's Cambrobrytannicae Cymraecaeve Linguae Institutiones et Rudimenta (1592) was the first grammar of the Welsh language written in Latin, the standard language of scholars at the time. It is dedicated to Sir Edward Stradling of St Donats, Glamorgan. The dedication is followed by Latin complimentary verses by Camden and John Stradling, a Latin address to the reader by Humphrey Prichard of Bangor, and Rhys's own Welsh preface. The book contains a grammar of the Welsh language, a discussion of the art of poetry and a collection of poetry in Welsh.

The grammar is of little value since Rhys tried to force the Welsh language into the Latin grammatical framework. The discussion of Welsh prosody is long and tedious, and copies entire passages from the bardic treatises. It is clear that Rhys often did not understand the meaning of these passages. However, the book has some value in preserving information not found elsewhere. In a long section concerning orthography and phonology Rhys stresses the need for distinctive symbols to represent distinct sounds. His new orthography was followed by Myddelton (1593 and 1603) and Henry Perry (1595), but never won general acceptance.

Rhys also wrote a long treatise on the early history of Britain in which he defends the historical value of Geoffrey of Monmouth's Historia Regum Britanniae against the attacks by Polydore Vergil and others. A manuscript translation into Welsh by Rhys of Aristotle's Metaphysics is said to have once existed in the library of Jesus College, Oxford. The National Library of Wales has a manuscript translation into Welsh by Rhys of a Latin poem by Thomas Leyson in praise of St Donat's.

== Publications ==
- Siôn Dafydd Rhys (1592), Cambrobrytannicae Cymraecaeve Linguae Institutiones et Rudimenta
- Siôn Dafydd Rhys (1951), Garfield H. Hughes (ed.), Cambrobrytannicae Cymraecaeve Linguae Institutiones et Rudimenta (1592). Ceir y rhagymadrodd yn Rhagymadroddion 1547-1659, Cardiff
- Siôn Dafydd Rhys (1954), "Llythyr at y Beirdd [Letter to the Poets]", in T. H. Parry-Williams (ed.), Rhyddiaith Gymraeg [Welsh Prose]... 1488–1609, Cardiff
- Siôn Dafydd Rhys (1954), "Olion Cewri [Remains of Giants]", in T. H. Parry-Williams (ed.), Rhyddiaith Gymraeg [Welsh Prose]... 1488–1609, Cardiff

== Sources ==
- Davies, Ceri (2013-03-14), "Est locus a castro decliui rupe recedens: a sense of place in some Latin works from Glamorgan", Neo-Latin Poetry in the British Isles, A&C Black, ISBN 978-1-4725-0301-5
- Lloyd, John Edward (1896). "Rhys, Ioan Dafydd" . In Lee, Sidney (ed.). Dictionary of National Biography. Vol. 48. London: Smith, Elder & Co. p. 92.
- Melchior, A. B. (1976), "Siôn Dafydd Rhys, M. D. (Siena)", Sudhoffs Archiv, 60 (3), Franz Steiner Verlag: 289–294, JSTOR 20776424
- Parry, Sir Thomas (1959), "RHYS, JOHN DAVID", Dictionary of Welsh Biography, Honourable Society of Cymmrodorion
- "Siôn Dafydd Rhys", Encyclopædia Britannica
- Stammerjohann, Harro (2009-06-02), Lexicon Grammaticorum: A bio-bibliographical companion to the history of linguistics, Walter de Gruyter, ISBN 978-3-484-97112-7
- Thomas, Daniel Lleufer (1898). "Stradling, Edward" . In Lee, Sidney (ed.). Dictionary of National Biography. Vol. 55. London: Smith, Elder & Co. pp. 13–14.
