= Thomas Leyson =

Welsh poet and physician

Thomas Leyson was a Welsh poet and physician in the 16th century.

A member of the gentry, Leyson was born in Neath, Glamorgan circa 1549 and roughly 20 miles from St. Donat's Castle. He studied at Winchester College and New College, Oxford, where he held a fellowship for nearly two decades. Although the exact date is unknown, in the mid-1580s, Leyson settled into a medical practice in Bath, where he eventually died. Little record of his family exists, but accounts mention that he was buried beside his wife.

Leyson wrote a Latin poem celebrating St Donat's Castle, which was translated into English by his friend John David Rhys. He was believed to have formed a friendship with Sir Edward Stradling, a patron of literature and St. Donat's, who donated substantial funding to improve the castle grounds. The construction at St. Donat's is a major theme of the poem, in which Leyson compliments Stradling's contributions as patron. Stradling was so impressed by Leyson's poem that he commissioned Rhys to complete the Welsh translation, which is over 100 lines long.
