= Stradling baronets =

Extinct baronetcy in the Baronetage of England

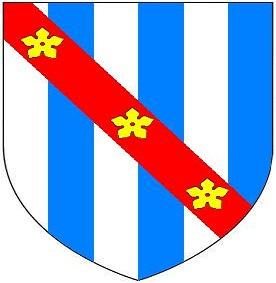
Arms of Stradling: Paly of six argent and azure, on a bend gules three cinquefoils or

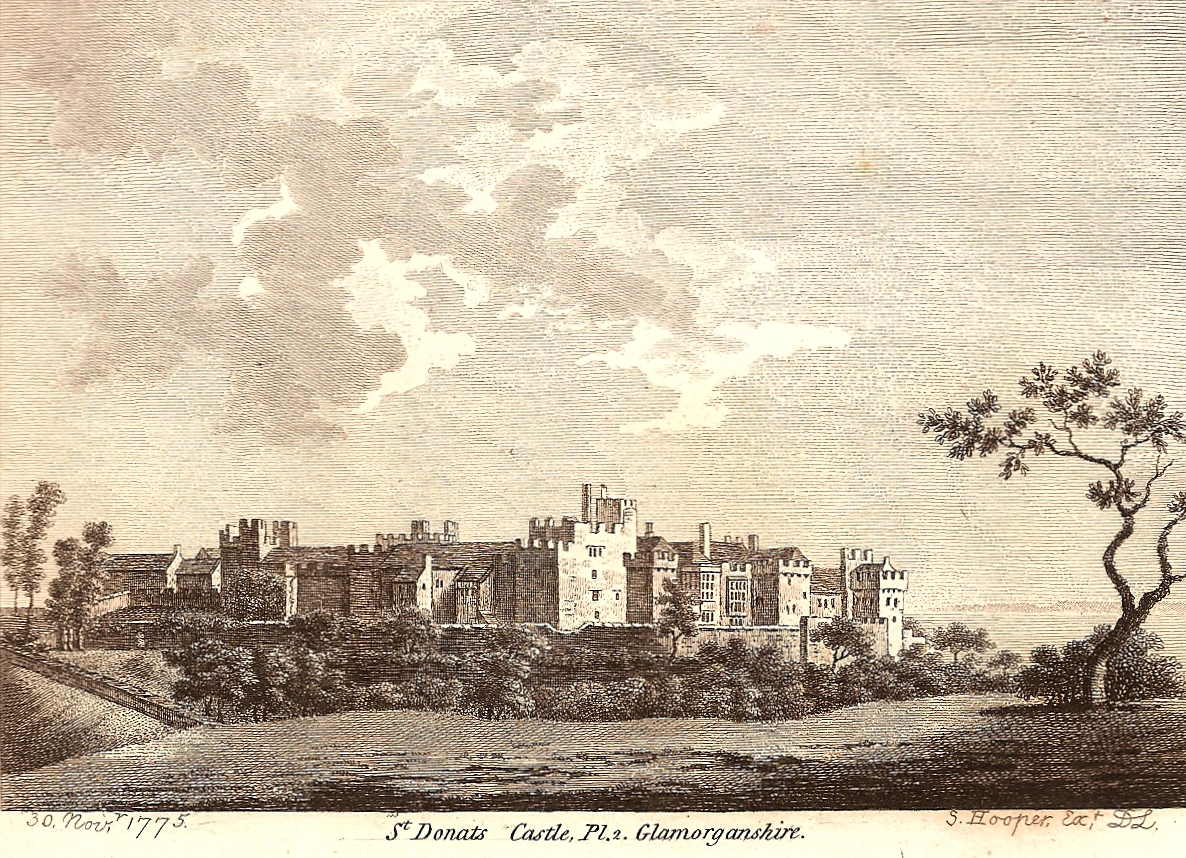
St Donat's Castle in 1775, the seat of the Stradling family

The Stradling Baronetcy, of St Donats in the County of Glamorgan, was a title in the Baronetage of England. It was created on 22 May 1611 for John Stradling, later Member of Parliament for St Germans and Old Sarum and Glamorgan. The second Baronet also represented Glamorgan in Parliament. The fifth Baronet was member of Parliament for Cardiff. The title became extinct on the death of the sixth Baronet in 1738.

George Stradling, younger son of the first Baronet, was Dean of Chichester Cathedral in 1672. Edward Stradling, eldest son of the fifth Baronet, was Member of Parliament for Cardiff in 1722 but died during his father's lifetime. His younger brother Thomas succeeded in the baronetcy.

The Stradlings were a family seated at St Donat's Castle, Glamorgan, Wales, from the Early Middle Ages, and played an important role in Glamorgan's history. Sir Edward Stradling, knight (died 1453) married Jane, a daughter of Cardinal Beaufort from his, according only to family tradition, affair with Alice FitzAlan. A later Sir Edward Stradling, knight (died 1609), collected a large library at St. Donat's, and from old papers he had collected wrote one of the first histories of Glamorgan, The Winning of the Lordship of Glamorgan out of Welshmens' Hands, thereby creating the legend of the Twelve Knights of Glamorgan, followers of Robert FitzHamon, Norman conqueror of Glamorgan. He placed a Stradling knight 12th in his list, yet recent scholarship has found the Stradling family to have come to Britain after the Norman Conquest, invalidating the inclusion of the now but legendary Stradling knight.

== Stradling baronets, of St Donats (1611) ==
- Sir John Stradling, 1st Baronet (1563–1637)
- Sir Edward Stradling, 2nd Baronet (1601–1644)
- Sir Edward Stradling, 3rd Baronet (c. 1624–c. 1660)
- Sir Edward Stradling, 4th Baronet (c. 1643–1685)
- Sir Edward Stradling, 5th Baronet (1672–1735)
- Sir Thomas Stradling, 6th Baronet (1710–1738)

Baronetage of England
Preceded by Shirley Baronets	Stradling Baronets; 22 May 1611	Succeeded by Leke Baronets
