= Thomas Stradling (MP) =

Welsh politician (1495–1571)

Sir Thomas Stradling (by 1495 – 27 January 1571), of St Donats, near Llantwit Major was a Welsh politician.

== Family ==
He was the son of Sir Edward Stradling by his wife, Elizabeth Arundell. One of his sisters, Jane, married John Popham. He himself married Catherine Gamage, and they had two sons, both MPs, David and Edward, and five daughters.

== Career ==
He was a member (MP) of the parliament of England for East Grinstead in 1553 and Arundel in 1554.
