= Strättligen =

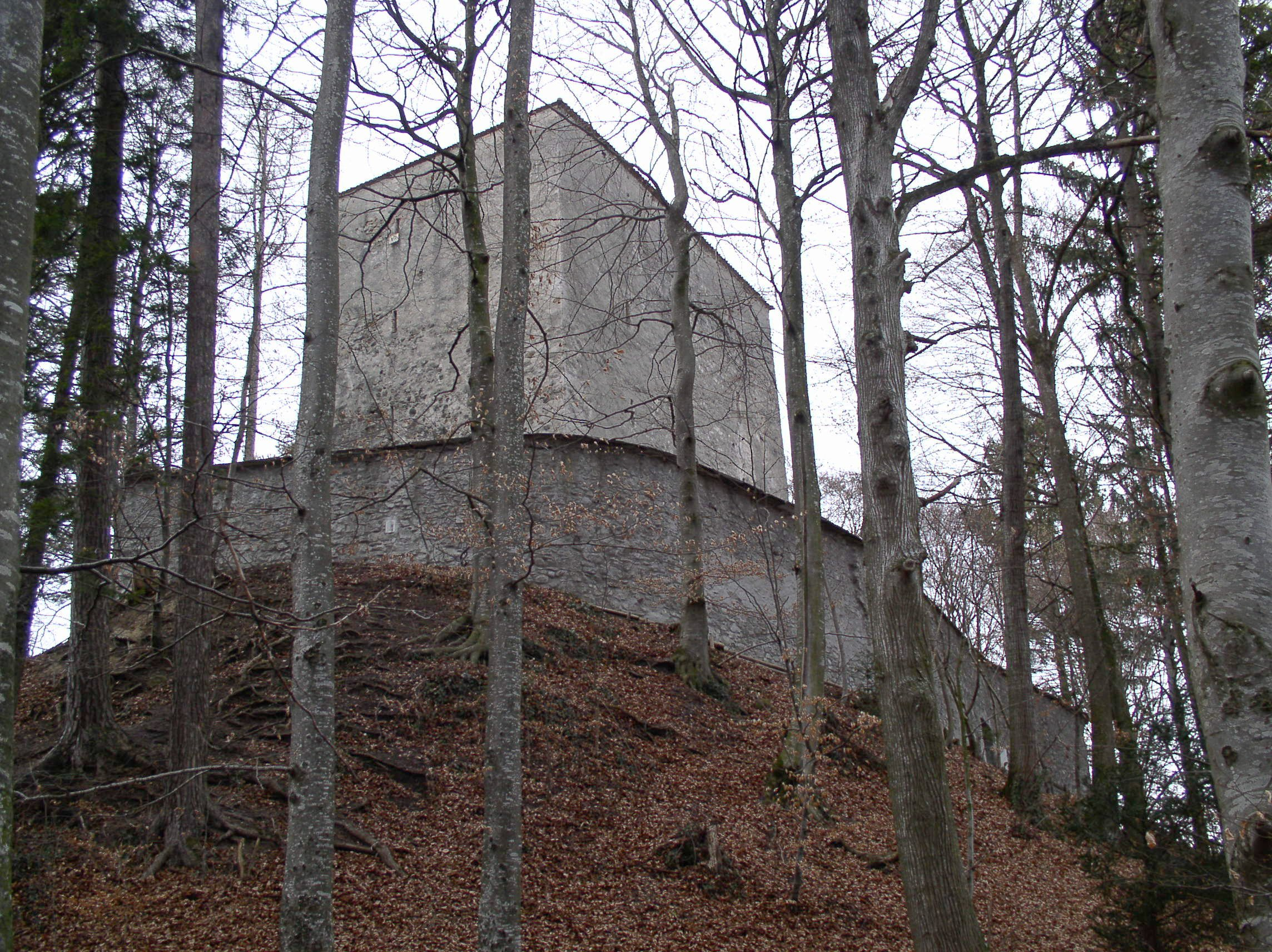
Strättligturm

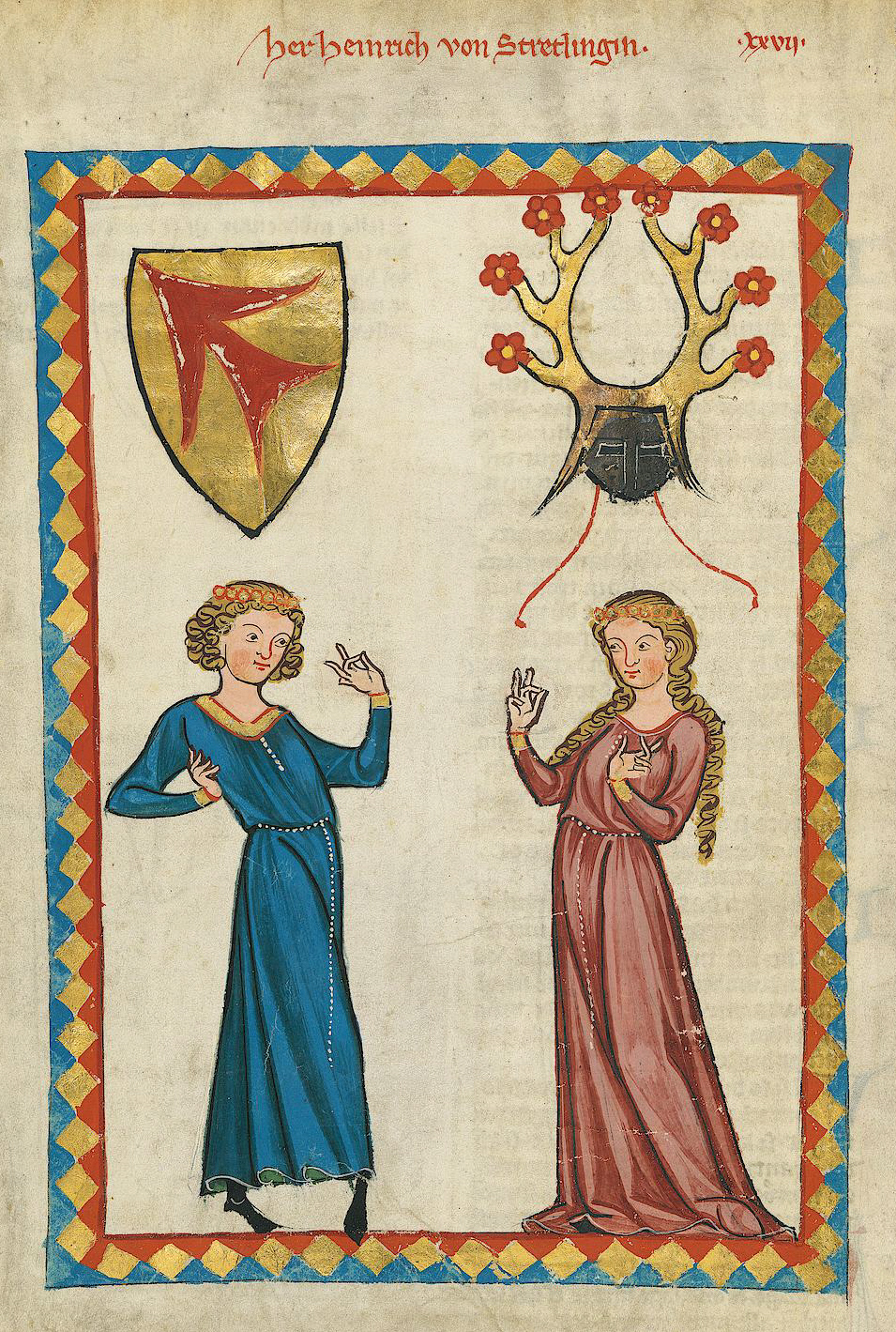
The minnesinger Heinrich von Stretlingin in Codex Manesse (fol. 70v), depicted with the arms of the von Strättligen family

Strättligen is a former municipality of the Swiss canton of Bern, since 1920 incorporated into the municipality of Thun. Its area accounts for roughly the southern half of the territory of present-day Thun municipality, including the districts of Scherzligen, Dürrenast, Neufeld, Allmendingen, Buchholz, Schoren, Gwatt.

The municipality consisted of a group of villages in the possession of the von Strättligen noble family, named for their home castle of Strättligburg, who during the 13th century ruled over much of the western Bernese Oberland. Strättligburg was destroyed by the Bernese in 1332, and the Strättligen possessions passed to Bern in 1594, administered by the Oberhofen reeve from 1662. The site of the ruined castle is now marked by the Strättligturm, a tower constructed in 1699. The municipality became destitute in the early 20th century and was forced to request its incorporation into Thun in 1920. During the later half of the 20th century, all former villages of Strättligen other than Allmendingen and Buchholz became integral part of the built-up area of the town.

Allmendingen is the site of an important cultic center of Gallo-Roman religion, in use during the 1st to 3rd centuries. The region of Lake Thun was at the time known as regio lindensis (i.e. Gaulish-Latin for "lake region"). The cultic center consisted of eight chapels or small temples surrounded by a wall. The Allmendingen cultic center was exemplary for the religious syncretism at the time; deities worshipped at the site included Mars (presumably in lieu of Caturix) and Rosmerta as well as Mithras.

The medieval village of Allmendingen is first mentioned in 1287. Before the correction of the Kander river in 1714, its lands were often inundated and yielded meagre crops. The first school was built in 1843. Allmendingen remained a village of subsistence farmers with a few hundred inhabitants until the late 19th century; in the 20th century, it was gradually transformed into a working-class residence area connected with the federal military industry which had been established in Thun in the 1860s. It experienced significant growth during the 1960s to 1990s, developing its own industrial area (including a large martial arts center and golf course in 1997), and is now separated from Thun Neufeld (a city district also built up since the 1920s) just by the A6 motorway (Thun Süd junction).

== See also ==
- Switzerland in the Roman era

== Literature ==
- Anne-Marie Dubler (2012), Strättligen in German, French and Italian in the online Historical Dictionary of Switzerland.
- Louis Hänni, Strättligen, Schaer Verlag, Thun 1997.
