= Ewa Junczyk-Ziomecka =

Polish diplomat

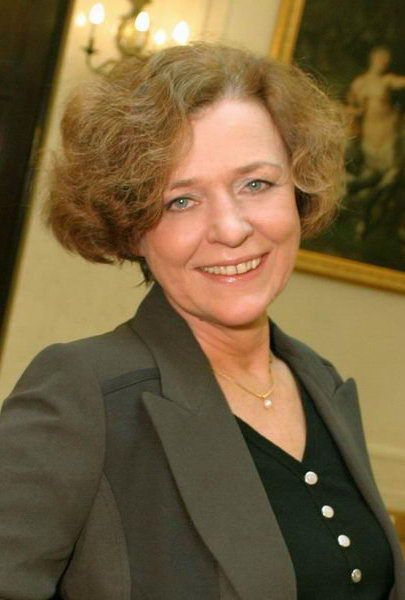
- Born: Ewa Junczyk; 19 May 1949 (age 77); Raszyn, Poland
- Education: University of Warsaw
- Occupations: lawyer, journalist, diplomat
- Organization(s): Open Republic Association, Association of the Jewish Historical Institute, Association of Polish Journalists
- Title: Consul General of the Republic of Poland in New York City
- Term: 2010–14
- Predecessor: Krzysztof Kasprzyk
- Successor: Urszula Gacek
- Spouse: Mariusz Ziomecki (divorce)
- Children: Daughter: Zuzanna, Son: Stanisław

Ewa Junczyk-Ziomecka (Polish pronunciation: ['ɛva 'junt͡ʂɨk-ʑɔ'mɛt͡ska]; born 19 May 1949) is a Polish lawyer, journalist, and former politician who served as secretary of state in the Chancellery of the President of the Republic of Poland under Lech Kaczyński between 2008 and 2010.

In 2010 Junczyk-Ziomecka was appointed Consul General of Poland, New York City, a position she held until 2014. On 19 January 2015, after completing the consular mission, she became the president of the Jan Karski Educational Foundation.

== Biography ==
Junczyk was born in Raszyn, Poland. After studying law and postgraduate journalism studies at the University of Warsaw, she worked as a journalist. During martial law, she was banned from practicing as a journalist, and then left for the United States.

In the 1980s, she was the editor-in-chief of Polish-American newspaper Dziennik Polski in Detroit. Involved in cooperation between the Polish, Jewish and Ukrainian communities in the United States. She chaired the Polish Election Commission in Michigan during the 1990 presidential election.

She returned to Poland in 1993. She then represented the University of Michigan in Poland, initiating and co-organizing, among others, international conferences on "Solidarity" and the Polish Round Table Agreement.

She was involved in the creation of the Museum of the History of Polish Jews "POLIN". From 2001, for five years, she was the director for development and deputy director of this emerging institution.

On 19 January 2006 she became Undersecretary of State, and on 23 April 2008, Secretary of State in the Chancellery of the President of the Republic of Poland, Lech Kaczyński. She supervised the Office of Social Initiatives and the Office of Citizens' Letters and Opinions of the Chancellery of the President of the Republic of Poland. On 24 February 2010, it was canceled.

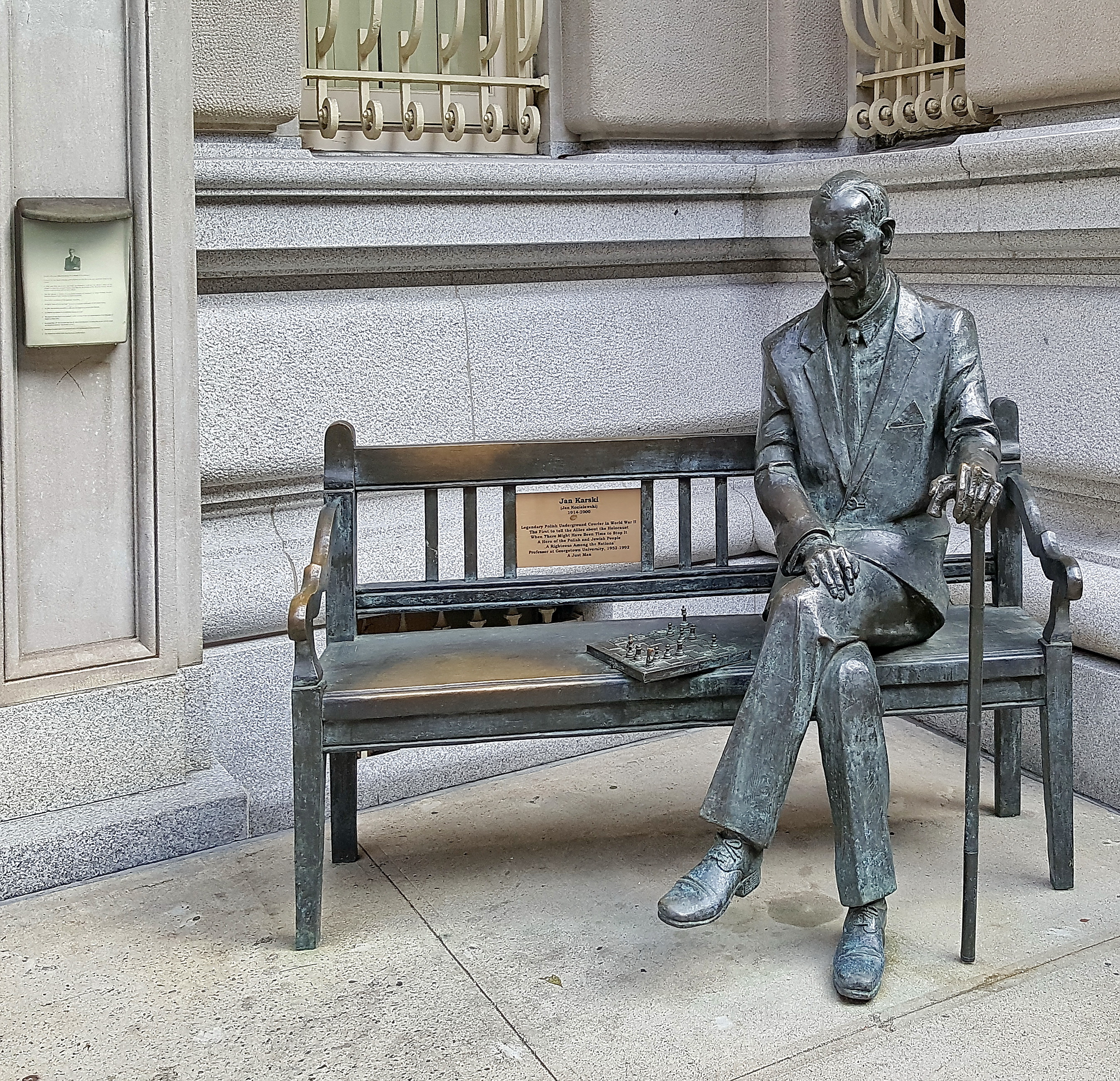
Jan Karski's Bench in front of the Consulate General of the Republic of Poland in New York City

On 1 March 2010, she took the position of Consul General of the Republic of Poland in New York City. She was consul general until 2014. During her tenure as consul general, the Karski program was inaugurated in the United States, and the Polish-American group Jan Karski Centennial Campaign was established, thanks to which Jan Karski was posthumously honored with the highest civilian decoration of the United States, the Presidential Medal of Freedom. In 2012 the Consulate General also inaugurated the annual Jan Karski Spirit Award, awarded by the Jan Karski Educational Foundation. Junczyk-Ziomecka became the first laureate of this award, followed by prominent American politicians: Ambassador to the UN, Samantha Power (2013) and Senator John McCain (2014).

Thanks to consular activities aimed at popularizing knowledge about Jan Karski, in March 2013 Georgetown University Press published in the USA – 69 years after the first publication – Jan Karski's book Story of a Secret State. During Ewa Junczyk-Ziomecka's tenure the Consulate General of the Republic of Poland in New York was also a place of intensive training for Polish and American teachers, the aim of which was to promote knowledge about the person and heritage of Jan Karski.

On 19 January 2015 she became the president of the Jan Karski Educational Foundation.

Member of the Open Republic Association, the Association of the Jewish Historical Institute and the Association of Polish Journalists. Author of several books, including about "Solidarity" and about Pope John Paul II.

She actively works for Polish-Jewish dialogue.

== Personal life ==
Her ex-husband is Mariusz Ziomecki (a Polish journalist and TV presenter), and she has two children: daughter Zuzanna and son Stanisław. Junczyk-Ziomecka was a close personal friend of the late Polish writer Ryszard Kapuściński and late Polish President Lech Kaczyński.

== Honours ==
Knight's Cross of the Order of Polonia Restituta

=== National honours ===
- Poland: Knight's Cross of the Order of Polonia Restituta (2015)
- Poland: Medal "Warsaw Ghetto Uprising (2006); (awarded by the Association of Jewish War Veterans and Victims of World War II)

=== Foreign honours ===
- Portugal: Grand Cross of the Order of Merit (2008)
