= Jan Karski Bench (Warsaw) =

Sculpture in Warsaw, Poland

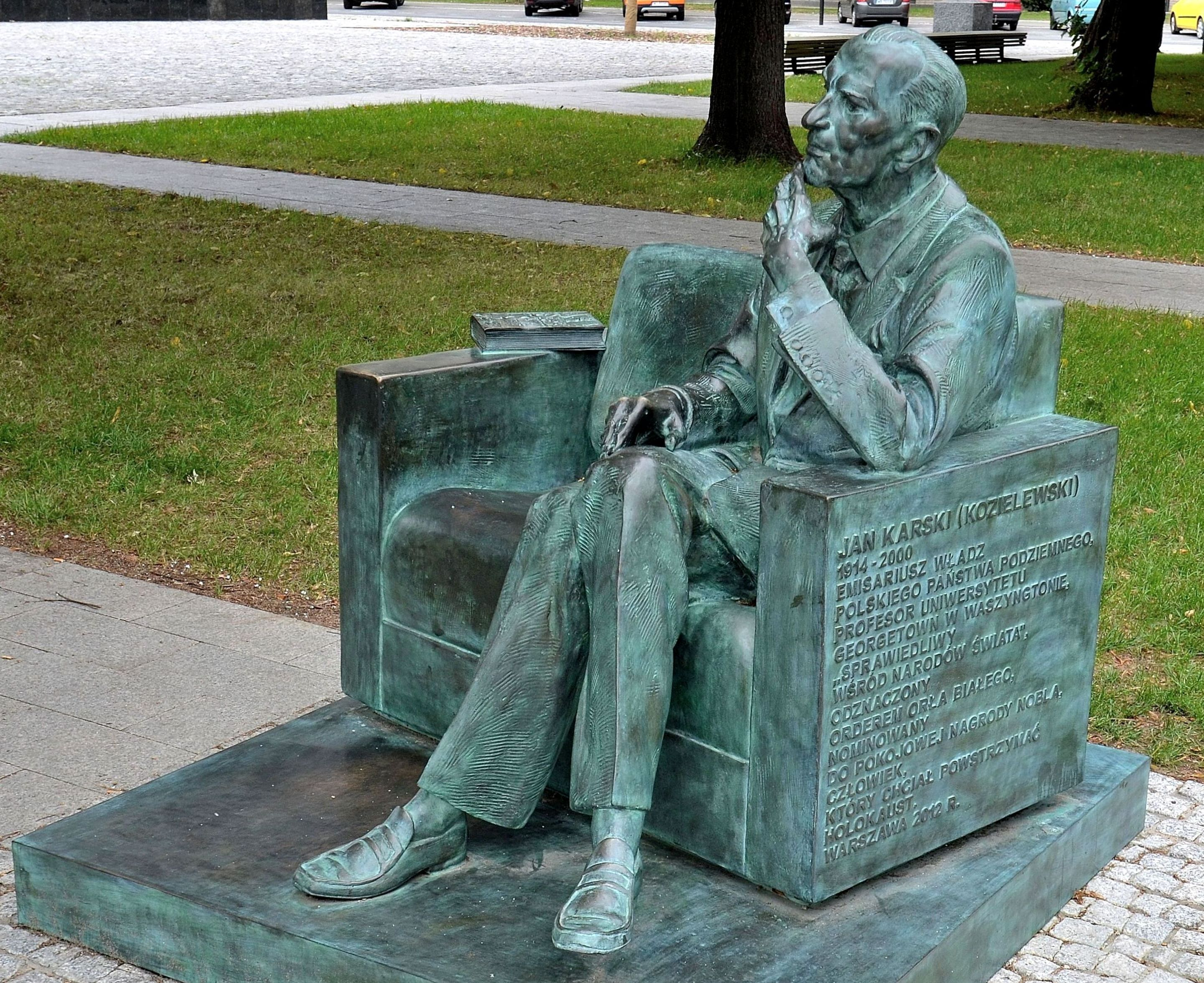
- The sculpture in 2013
- Interactive map of Jan Karski Bench
- Location: Downtown, Warsaw, Poland
- Coordinates: 52°14′57.68″N 20°59′39.98″E
- Designer: Karol Badyna
- Type: Statue, bench monument
- Material: Bronze
- Opening date: 11 June 2013
- Dedicated to: Jan Karski

The Jan Karski Bench (Polish: [ˈjan ˈkar.ski]; Polish: Ławeczka Jana Karskiego) is a bronze statue in Warsaw, Poland, located at the intersection of Anielewicza and Zamenhofa Streets, next to the POLIN Museum of the History of Polish Jews and the Monument to the Ghetto Heroes. It is located in the neighbourhood of Muranów within the Downtown district. It is dedicated to Jan Karski (1914–2000), a 20th-century soldier, diplomat, and political scientist, who as a member of the Polish resistance, reported to the Western Allies about state of occupied Poland, Germany's destruction of the Warsaw Ghetto and its operation of extermination camps on Polish soil. The monument depicts him sitting on an armchair, leaving additional space for passersby to sit next to him. It was designed by Karol Badyna, and unveiled on 11 June 2013.

== History ==
The monument was dedicated to Jan Karski (1914–2000), a 20th-century soldier, diplomat, and political scientist, who as a member of the Polish resistance, reported to the Western Allies about state of occupied Poland, Germany's destruction of the Warsaw Ghetto and its operation of extermination camps on Polish soil. The sculpture was designed by Karol Badyna, and unveiled on 11 June 2013. The monument was proposed by the Museum of Polish History, and financed by the city of Warsaw.

It was Badyna's sixth bench monument dedicated to Karski, after Washington, D.C. (2002), Kielce (2005), New York City (2007), Łódź (2009), and Tel Aviv (2009). They were criticized by Karski's family, stating that he was against being commemorated with monuments, as well as by them having form of benches.

== Design ==
The monument depicts Jan Karski sitting on a left side of a large recliner armchair. He is depicted thinking, while wearing a suit, with his legs crossed, and his left arm on an armrest, with his hand rubbing his chin. The right side of the chair, forms a bench, for passersby to sit on. The right armrest also features a sculpture of Karski's 1944 book Story of a Secret State. The monument is also equipped with a sound system, which plays a recording about Karski's memories from before the start of the Second World War, and after its end, when he worked for the Ministry of Foreign Affairs of Poland. It is placed at a garden square, near the intersection of Anielewicza and Zamenhofa Streets, next to the POLIN Museum of the History of Polish Jews and the Monument to the Ghetto Heroes. The left side of the armchair features a Polish inscription, which reads:

Polish inscription

Jan Karski (Kozielewski)
1914–2000
Emisariusz władz Polskiego Państwa Podziemnego
Profesor Uniwersytetu Georgetown w Waszyngtonie
„Sprawiedliwy wśród Narodów Świata”
Odznaczony Orderem Orła Białego
Nominowany do Pokojowej Nagrody Nobla
Człowiek, który chciał powstrzymać Holokaust
Warszawa 2012 r.

Translation:
English translation

Jan Karski (Kozielewski)
1914–2000
The emissary of the government of Polish Underground State
Professor of the Georgetown University in Washington, D.C.
"Righteous Among the Nations"
Distinguished with the Order of the White Eagle
Nominated to the Nobel Peace Prize
Man, who wanted to stop the Holocaust
Warsaw, 2012

== Gallery ==
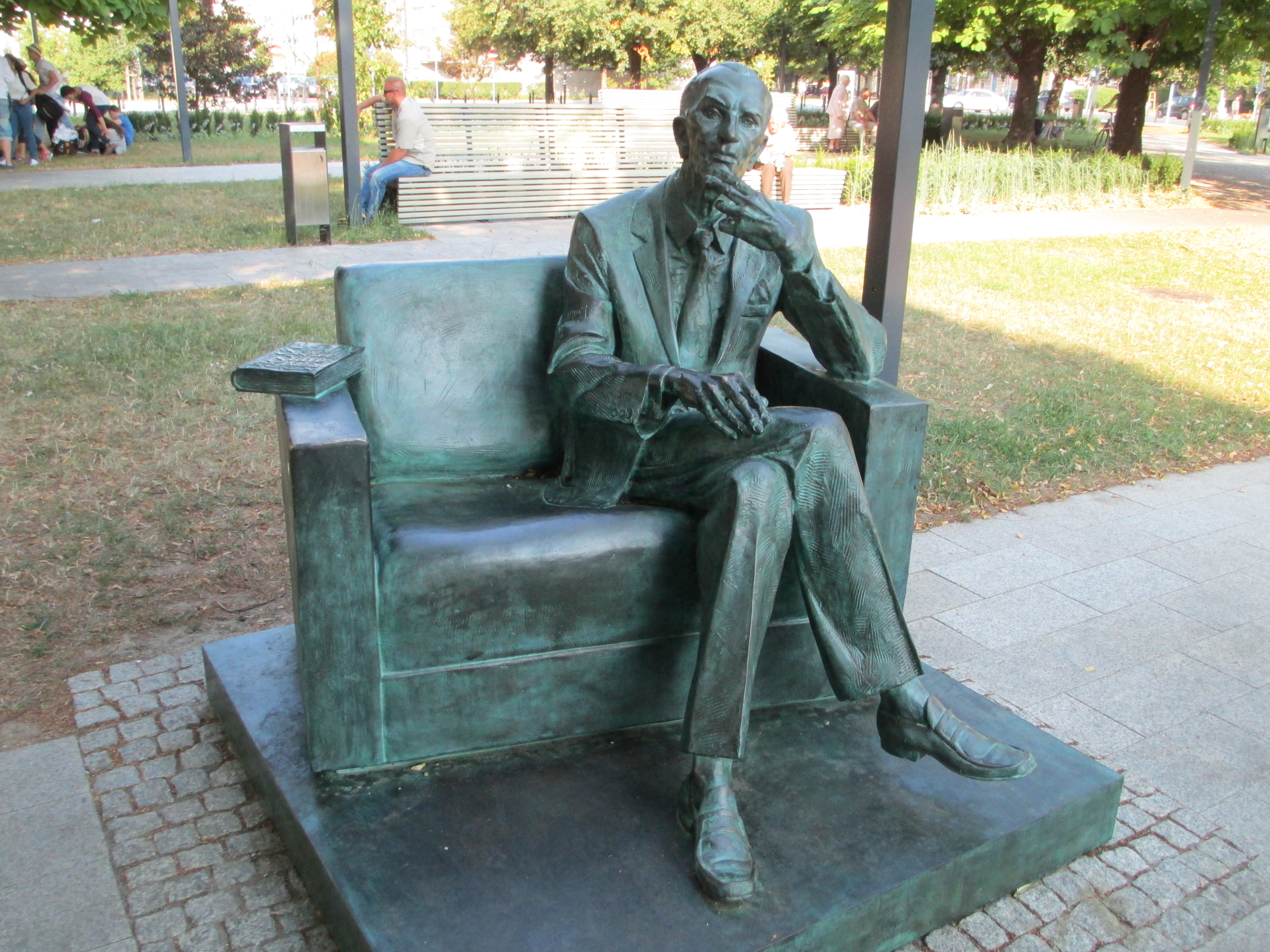
The monument from the front

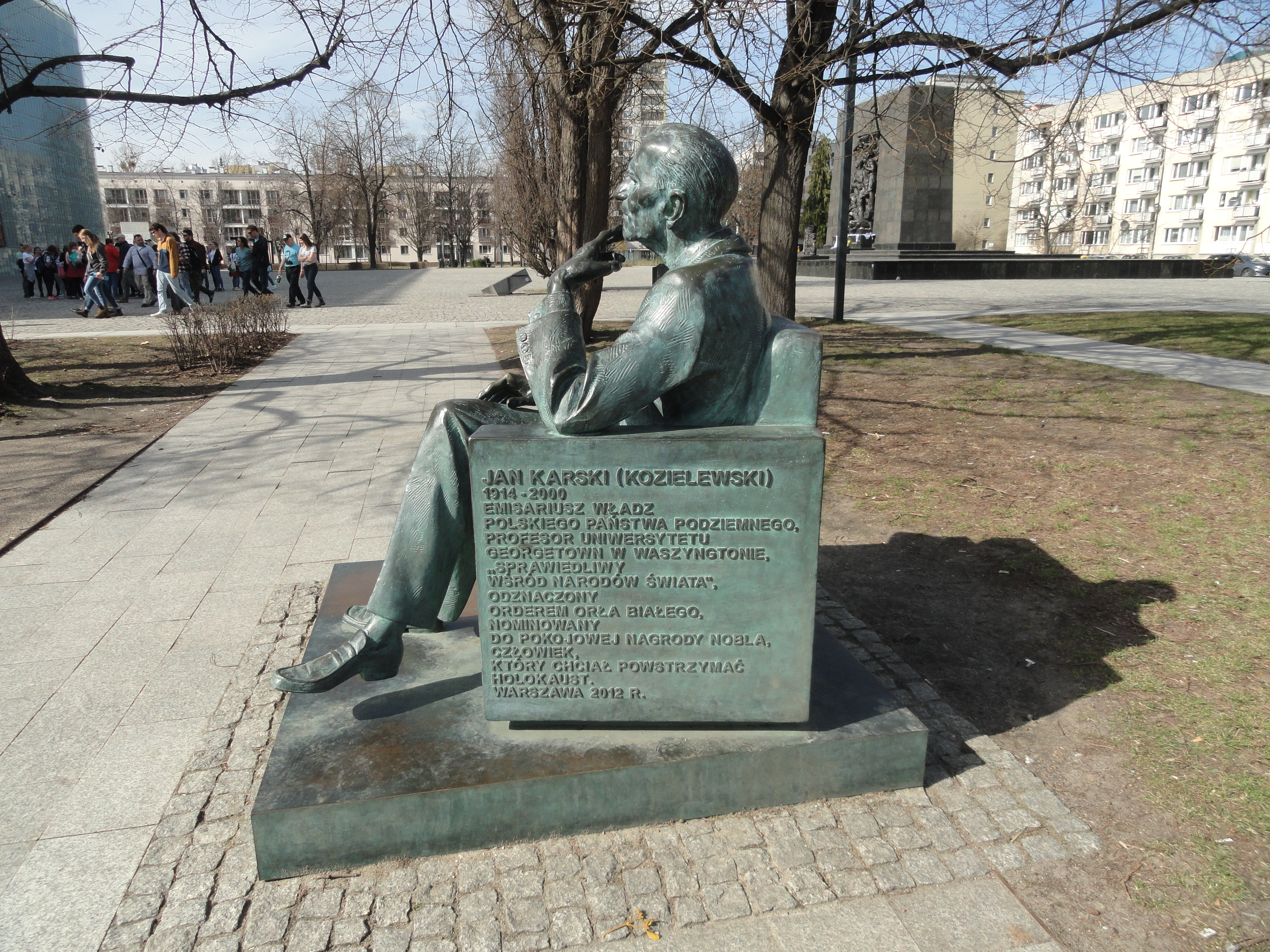
The monument from the left side

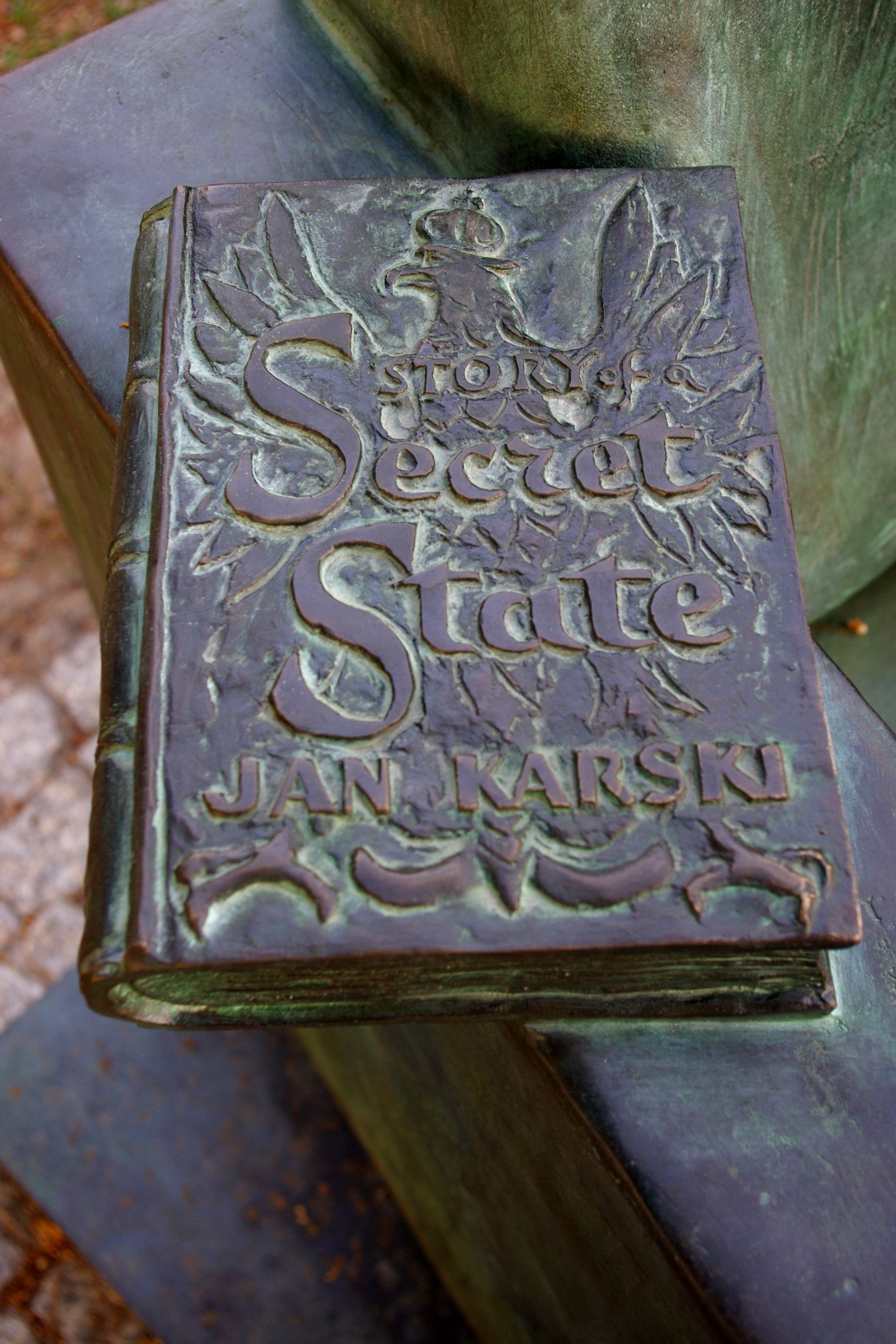
Sculpture of book Story of a Secret State

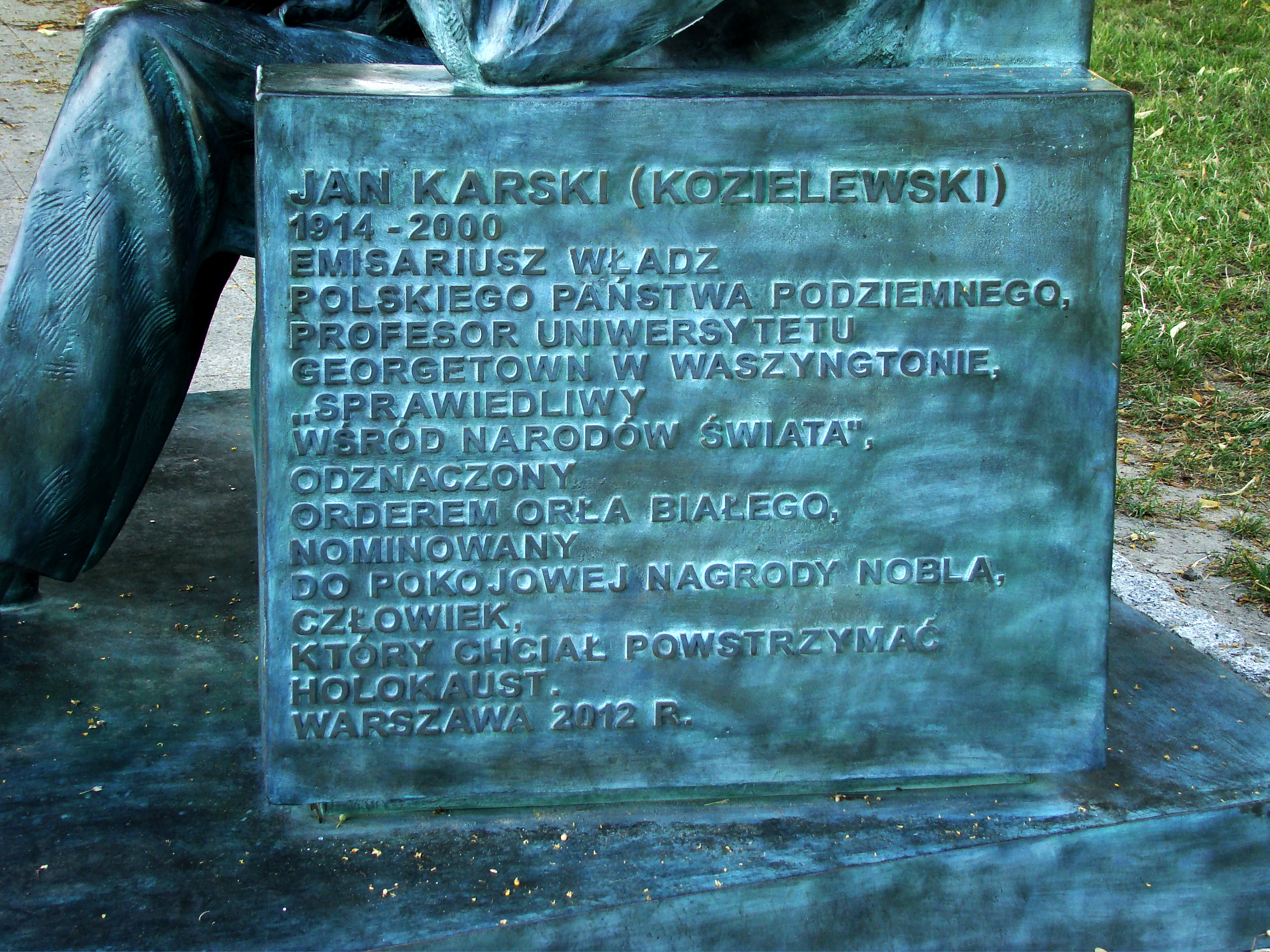
Inscription on the side of the monument
