= Maciej Golubiewski =

Polish diplomat

- Born: May 7, 1976 (age 50); Łódź, Poland
- Citizenship: Polish
- Education: Washington and Lee University; Johns Hopkins University
- Occupations: political scientist, diplomat
- Title: Consul General of the Republic of Poland in New York City
- Term: 2017–19
- Predecessor: Urszula Gacek
- Successor: Adrian Kubicki

Maciej Benedykt Golubiewski (born May 7, 1976) is a Polish political scientist and diplomat. Between 2017 and 2019 he served as the Consul General of the Republic of Poland in New York City.

== Education ==
Golubiewski was born in Łódź, Poland. He passed the International Baccalaureate exams at United World College of the Atlantic in south Wales in Great Britain (1995). He graduated Phi Beta Kappa and summa cum laude from Washington and Lee University (1999) with a Bachelor of Arts degree in philosophy, politics, and economics. He later studied political science at Johns Hopkins University (Master of Arts, 2005). From 2005 to 2008 he was a PhD student at Johns Hopkins University and the University of Mannheim.

== Career ==
For ten years Golubiewski lived in Washington, D.C., working in business consulting and cooperating with NGOs, think tanks, and universities, including the Center for Family and Human Rights. He was an intern at US Senator Richard Lugar's office.

In 2008, he joined the European Commission in Brussels, and in 2011 in the newly established European External Action Service. Golubiewski dealt with the regional policy of eastern Africa and the countries of the Indian Ocean, participating in trade negotiations with the ACP economic bloc. From 2014 to 2016, he was the deputy ambassador of the European Union to the EU Delegation in Beirut, and its head of the political and media section.

Between 2017 and 2019, when he was succeeded by Adrian Kubicki, Golubiewski was the Consul General of the Republic of Poland in New York City. In October 2019, he became head of the office of the European Commissioner for Agriculture and Rural Development, Janusz Wojciechowski.

Golubiewski is a member of the advisory committee at the Catholic University of America. He was an expert at the Sobieski Institute and the National Center for Strategic Studies.
