= Fernando Alonso (disambiguation) =

Fernando Alonso (born 1981) is a Spanish racing driver.

Fernando Alonso may also refer to:

== People ==
- Fernando Alonso (engineer) (born 1956), Spanish engineer
- Fernando Alonso (dancer) (1914–2013), Cuban ballet dancer

== Fictional characters ==
- Fernando Alonso (character), a character voiced by the racing driver namesake in the Spanish version of Cars 2
