= UWC Atlantic =

Boarding school in Wales

Location
- St Donat's Castle; Llantwit Major; Wales; 51°24′05″N 03°31′57″W

Information
- Type: Private school, boarding, international school
- Established: 1962; 64 years ago
- Principal: Naheed Bardai
- Staff: 144
- Enrollment: 350
- Campus size: 30 Hectares (75 acres)
- Campus type: Residential
- Colours: Blue and teal
- Affiliation: United World Colleges
- Website: uwcatlantic.org

United World College of the Atlantic (UWC Atlantic), formerly Atlantic College, is a private boarding school in Llantwit Major in Wales. Founded in 1962, it was the first of the United World Colleges and was among the first educational institutions in the world to follow an international curriculum. It helped create the International Baccalaureate Diploma Programme in the 1960s.

The college is attended by approximately 350 students from more than 90 countries, with students including refugees and victims of war, members of persecuted communities, and members of royal families and political dynasties from around the world. The majority of its students are selected internationally through their UWC National Committees which facilitate nationwide selection processes across the world in over 120 countries, and help fund student education through partial or full scholarships. Over 65% of students who apply through these national committees receive some form of scholarship or financial aid awards. The total fees per year are around $75,000 US Dollars.

In addition to the IBDP, UWC Atlantic places student participation in community service at its core. It is known for its liberal education, its global ethos, and its strong focus on local and global development and sustainability.

== History ==
Atlantic College was founded by Kurt Hahn, a German educationalist who had previously set up the Schule Schloss Salem and the Stiftung Louisenlund in Germany, Gordonstoun School in Scotland, and the Outward Bound movement. Hahn founded the college as a practical response to the search for new and peaceful solutions in a post-war world riven by political, racial and economic divisions.

Hahn had been invited by British Air Marshal Sir Lawrence Darvall to address the NATO Defence College in 1955, where he saw former enemies from several nations working together towards a common goal, and realised how much more could be done to overcome the hostility of the Cold War if young people from different nations could be brought together in a similar way. He envisaged a college for students who were already grounded in their own cultures but impressionable enough to learn from others. Drawn from all nations, the students would be selected purely on merit and potential, regardless of race, religion, nationality and background. The college was the result of Kurt Hahn's vision and the work of individuals such as the founding Headmaster Rear Admiral Desmond Hoare, Director of Studies Robert Blackburn, Air Marshal Lawrance Darvall, Alec Peterson (who established the curriculum for the college, and later served as the International Baccalaureate's first director-general), and Antonin Besse, who donated St Donat's Castle for the college's premises.

On 19 September 1962, the college opened under the name Atlantic College with nine teaching staff and 56 male students aged between 16 and 19 years from 12 countries; in 1967, the school became co-educational, with a cohort hailing from 35 nations. The school was hailed by The Times of London as "the most exciting experiment in education since the Second World War."

From its founding, the school was intended to be the first of a series, initially to be named "The Atlantic Colleges." In 1967, Lord Mountbatten of Burma became President of the organisation and the term United World Colleges came into existence, with an international office in London, and the school became known as the United World College of the Atlantic. Mountbatten was an enthusiastic UWC supporter and encouraged heads of state, politicians and personalities throughout the world to share his interest. He was personally involved in founding what became the third UWC – the United World College of South East Asia – in Singapore in 1975, following the founding of the second College, the Lester B Pearson United World College of the Pacific in Canada in 1974.

In 1978, Mountbatten passed the presidency to his great-nephew, the then Prince of Wales Charles. Former presidents of the United World Colleges also include Nelson Mandela of South Africa (from 1995 until his death in 2013), a position he shared with the current holder of the position, Queen Noor of Jordan. Queen Elizabeth II was a patron of the college, from its early days until her death in 2022. In 2022, the UWC movement was nominated to the Nobel Peace Prize by politician Alfred Bjørlo.

== College ==
The college's stated mission is to "make education a force to unite people, nations, and cultures for peace and a sustainable future". Students from over 90 countries participate in UWC Atlantic's two-year programme, in which they combine academic studies with activities and service. Admission into United World Colleges, and scholarship awards, are decided primarily by national UWC committees around the world, with a smaller number of students applying directly to the college through the Global Selection Programme.

=== Academics ===
UWC Atlantic was one of the first colleges in the world, and the first in the UK, to follow an international curriculum, and offers the International Baccalaureate Diploma Programme. The college was one of the key institutions involved in the creation of the International Baccalaureate, and continues to be actively involved in its development. In May 1967, 108 students at Atlantic College joined 37 at the International School of Geneva to sit the first trial exams for the IB. Having already participated in these pilot exams in parallel to offering the British GCE A-Levels, in 1971 the college became the first school in the world to entirely abandon a national curriculum and qualifications in favor of the new program.

IB graduates are typically accepted at the most competitive colleges and universities around the world, with many enrolling in Ivy League universities in the United States as well as British universities. Students at the college are eligible, after graduation, to participate in the Davis United World College Scholars Program, which funds undergraduate study for UWC students at selected universities in the United States.

=== Service ===
Service has been a core part of the college's ethos and structure since its founding, rooted in Kurt Hahn's philosophy and belief that physical activity and especially service to others were vital elements of a well rounded education. At the beginning of each year at the college, students are obliged to select 3 activities that they will each carry out for at least 2 hours a week as part of the International Baccalaureate's Creativity, Activity, Service (CAS) requirement. The opportunity to undertake weekly community service, physical activity, and creative activity offers students a 'counterbalance' to the Diploma Programme's academic pressures, and allows the students an opportunity to reflect on their experiences and develop specific interests and passions.

Additionally, UWC Atlantic runs a "Project Week" every year, giving students a chance to delve into either service based or expedition based experiences, and hosts student-ran Conferences on a quarterly basis offering deep introspection to students into the chosen conference topic.

=== Boat-building ===
RNLI rescue boats at the Atlantic College Lifeboat Station at the St Donats seafront in 1966, with St Donat's castle and the college grounds in the background.

The college has a strong tradition of boat design and boat building. The Atlantic College Lifeboat Station stood within its grounds as an active RNLI lifeboat station from 1963, when it opened as one of the first experimental inshore lifeboat (ILB) stations established in the United Kingdom, and staffed mostly by students participating in the college's Inshore Lifeboat service, until 2013.

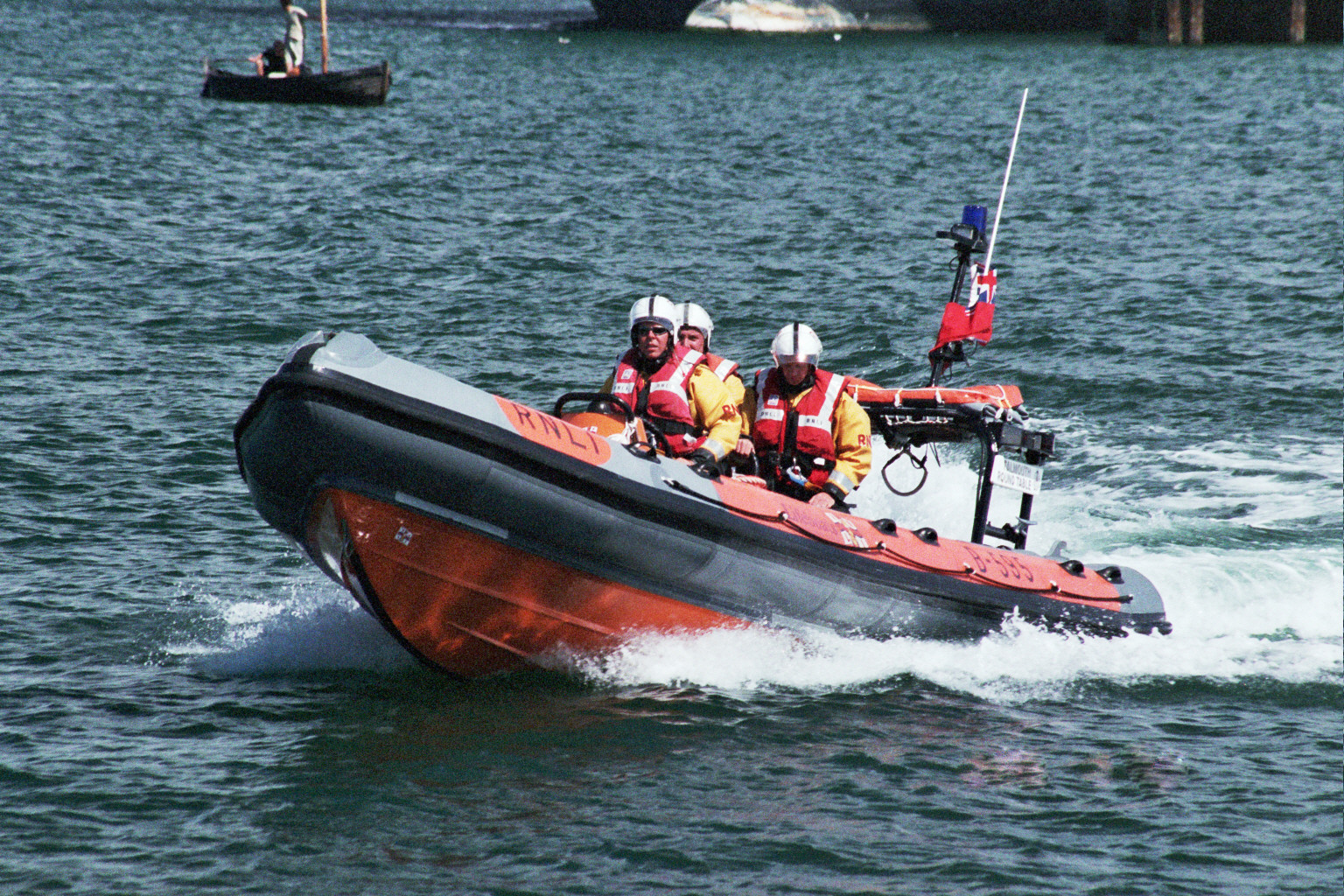
Atlantic class 21.

Much of the development of the Atlantic 21, 75 and 85 classes of lifeboat took place at Atlantic College. What was to become the world's most widely used type of craft for inshore rescue, the rigid inflatable boat (RIB), was originally conceived, designed, prototyped, tested, and built at the college under its founding headmaster, retired Rear-Admiral Desmond Hoare. The B Class Atlantic Inshore Lifeboat was named by the RNLI after its birthplace. It has often been claimed that, had the college earned royalties on every rigid-hulled inflatable boat now in service, its scholarship fund would have never looked back; instead, Desmond Hoare, who eventually patented the design in 1973, sold the rights to the RNLI for the nominal fee of one pound; he did not cash the cheque, which is still displayed at the college. David Sutcliffe, a member of the founding staff of the college and its second headmaster, published The RIB The Rigid-Hulled Inflatable Lifeboat and its Place of Birth The Atlantic College in 2010, a book that tells the story of the inception of the RIB (rigid inflatable boat).

The building of ILB training vessels at the school is a longstanding student activity, and were used for practice and training of the student-led RNLI crews at the station until its closure in 2013. In 2014 students at the college helped design a new boat in conjunction with companies in Japan, to help in the aftermath of a tsunami. The college, through Atlantic Pacific International Rescue, still provides support and training for rescue efforts for migrants making hazardous sea crossings.

=== Sports ===
The college offers a range of sports and fitness activities as part of the CAS component of the IB Diploma and as co-curricular activities. Facilities include indoor and outdoor swimming pools, tennis courts, a climbing wall, a sports hall with basketball and badminton courts, a five-a-side football pitch, dance studio, and gym equipment, and playing fields used for football and rugby. The college's football team participate in the South Wales Youth League, a regional youth league.

Students also participate in a range of activities that take advantage of the college's seafront location, including cliff abseiling, rock climbing, hiking, and sea kayaking.

== Grounds and facilities ==
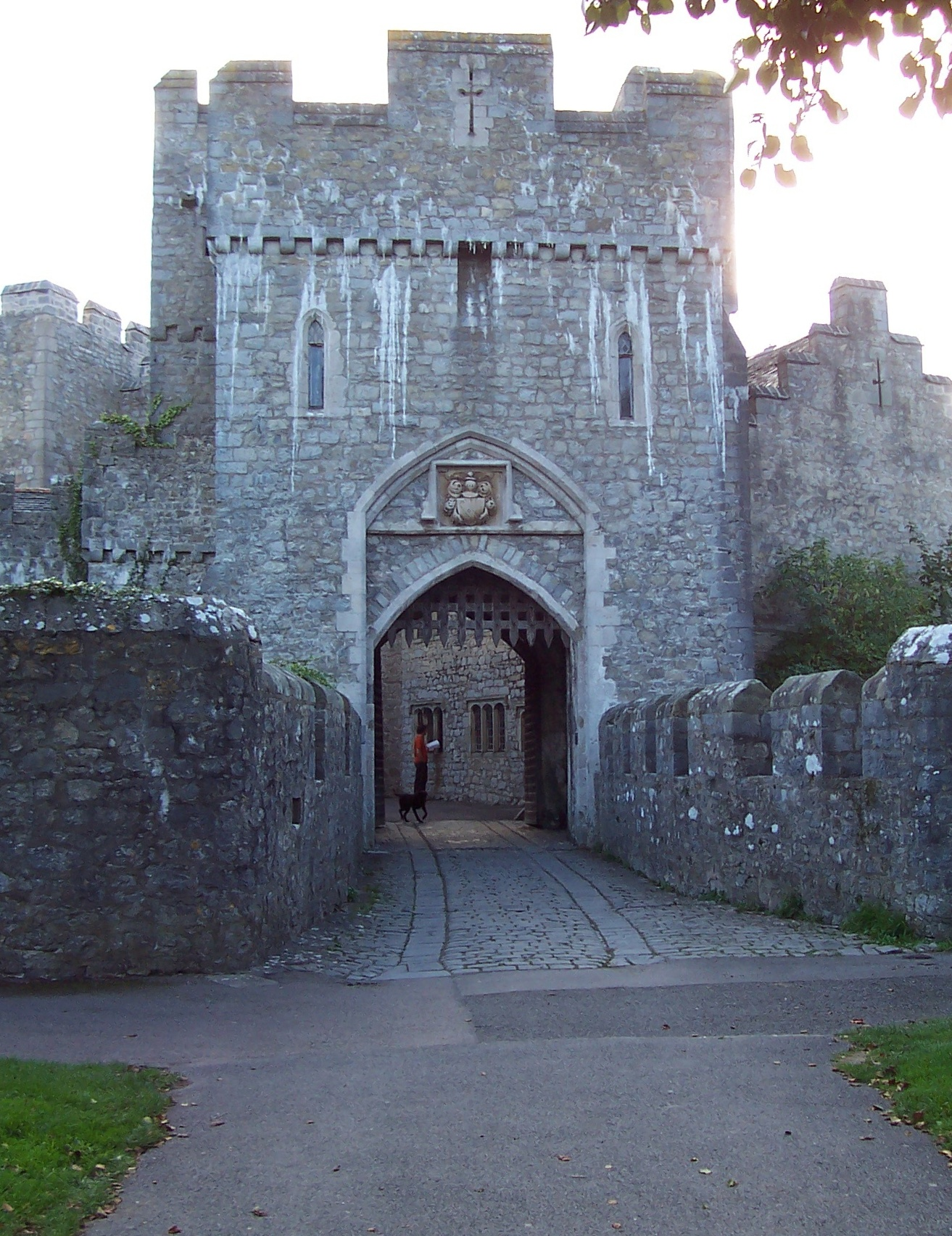
The gatehouse at St Donat's Castle

UWC Atlantic is located at St Donat's Castle, a 12th-century castle near the town of Llantwit Major on the South Wales coast, overlooking the Bristol Channel. The castle has been continuously inhabited since it was first built. The extensive grounds also include the 12th-century St Donat's Church and the historic terraced gardens, as well as preserved woodland, farmland and Heritage Coastline. St Donat's Castle is the main building of the college, housing the Tudor great hall, the gothic dining hall, Bradenstoke Hall (today used for assemblies and performances), an extensive 25,000-book library, staff offices, student common areas and certain academic departments. Before being purchased for use by the college by Antonin Besse, it was owned by William Randolph Hearst, who undertook major renovations, including transporting the roof and fireplace from the Bradenstoke Priory in Wiltshire and an ornate, gilded and vaulted ceiling from a church in Boston, Lincolnshire.

Lessons take place in modern academic blocks built in the 1960s–80s, converted medieval estate buildings, and the castle itself. Next to the castle are the social and gymnasium blocks, and the 12th-century tithe barn (with a contemporary extension), which is both used by the college and open to the public as a theatre, arts centre and cinema. The college owns sports fields, tennis courts, and in addition to indoor and outdoor swimming pools have a range of surf and rescue equipment, kayaks, sailing boats, RNLI training boats, and a cliff suitable for climbing and rescue practice.

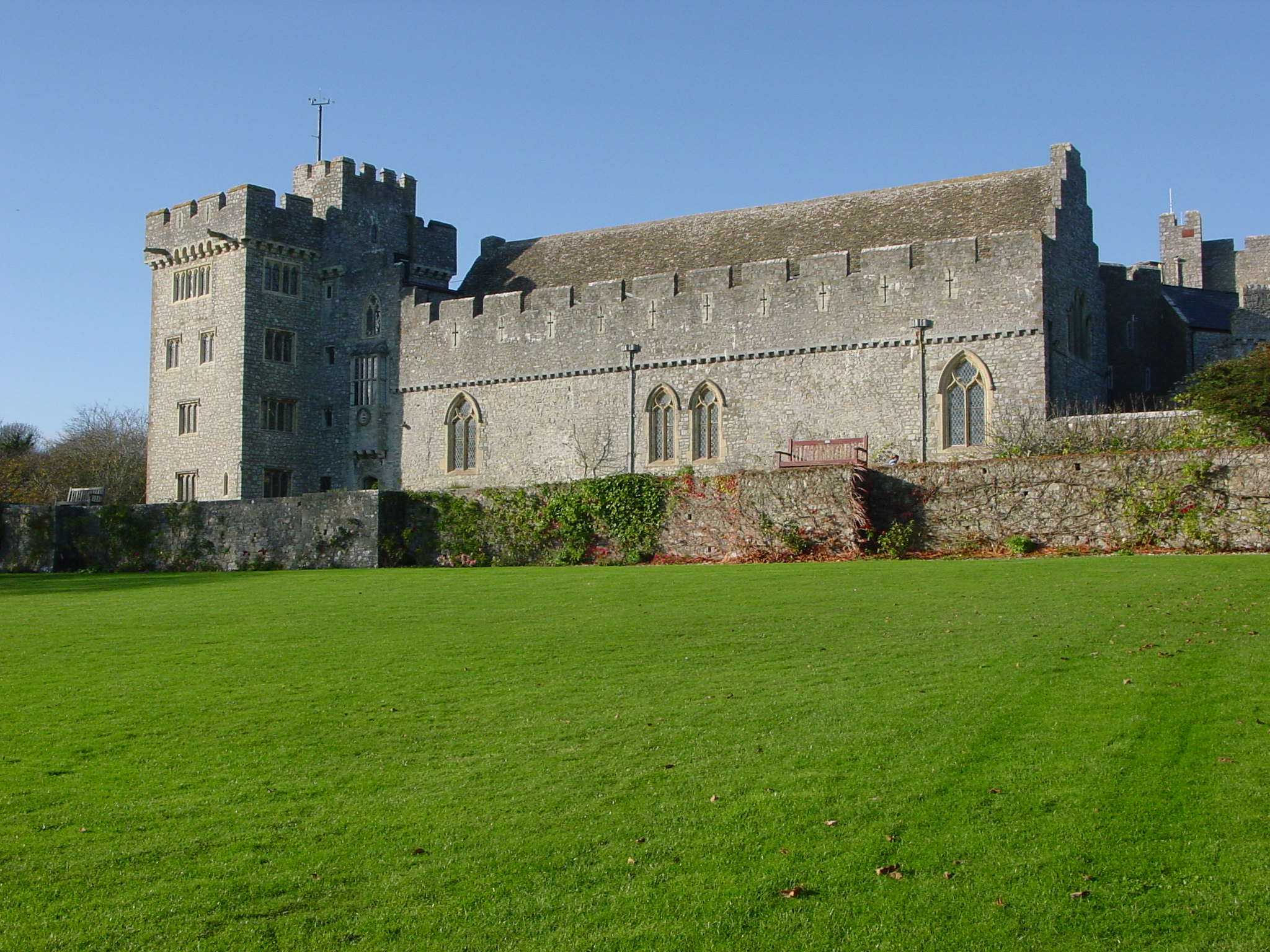
Middle Lawn at St Donat's Castle.

In 2004, the college installed a carbon neutral biomass heating system to replace an aging and unsustainable oil-based system. It runs on locally sourced sustainable woodchip biomass, and makes the campus the largest site in the UK to be heated in such a way. Students live in eight modern accommodation houses built in the castle grounds named after either ancient Welsh kingdoms, important individuals in the college's history, and benefactors: Powys, Whitaker, Gwynedd, Kurt Hahn, Antonin Besse, Pentti Kouri, Madiba, Tice, and Sunley. The Pentti Kouri house, formerly Dyfed, was refurbished in the autumn of 2008 to include sustainable technologies such as geothermal heating and an energy usage monitoring system.

Due largely to the college's setting at the castle, in combination with its reputation as a progressive institution, media sometimes use terms such as "Hogwarts for hippies" to describe the school.

The college has hosted several royal visitors to the castle, including Queen Elizabeth II and Prince Philip, Duke of Edinburgh, Lord Mountbatten, King Charles III and Diana, Princess of Wales, as well as Emperor Akihito and Empress Michiko of Japan, Queen Beatrix and Prince Claus of the Netherlands, King Willem-Alexander (an alumnus) and Queen Máxima of the Netherlands, and King Felipe VI and Queen Letizia of Spain. The fiftieth anniversary of the college in 2012 was marked by a visit by Queen Noor of Jordan, in her role as President of the United World Colleges. Senior politicians such as former Prime Minister of Canada Lester B. Pearson and former Prime Minister of the United Kingdom Alec Douglas-Home also visited St Donat's, as have several ambassadors and diplomats.

== Principals ==
- 1962: Desmond Hoare
- 1969: David Sutcliffe
- 1982: Andrew Stuart
- 1990: Colin Jenkins
- 2000: Malcolm McKenzie
- 2007: Neil Richards
- 2010: Paul Motte (acting)
- 2012: John Walmsley
- 2016: Gerry Holden (caretaker)
- 2017: Peter Howe
- 2021: Naheed Bardai

== Notable alumni ==
- Howard Newby (1947–), British sociologist and academic
- Martyn Huw Williams (1947–), Welsh broadcaster and journalist
- David Ceperley (1949–), American physicist
- Eyal Ofer (1950–), Israeli businessman and philanthropist
- Wang Guangya (1950–), Chinese diplomat
- Jorma Ollila (1950–), Finnish businessman
- Seppo Honkapohja (1951–), Finnish economist
- Mónica Mayer (1954 - ), Mexican feminist artist
- Edoardo Agnelli (1954–2000), Italian businessman
- Kari Blackburn (1954–2007), British news reporter
- Aernout van Lynden (1955–), Dutch journalist
- Hakeem Belo-Osagie (1955–), Nigerian businessman
- David Voas (1955–), British-American sociologist
- Ghaleb Cachalia (1956–), South African businessman and politician
- Fernando Alonso (1956–), Spanish engineer
- Charles Kuta (1956–), American computer engineer
- Uberto Pasolini (1957–), Italian film producer
- Jonathan Michie (1957–), British economist
- Tim Owen (1958–), British barrister
- Olivia Bloomfield (1960–), British life peer
- Nick Brown (1962–), British botanist and academic
- David Cunliffe (1963–), New Zealand politician
- Julie Payette (1963–), Canadian engineer, astronaut and Governor General
- Ulrich Meyer-Bothling (1963-), German eye surgeon and research scientist
- Helen Pankhurst (1964–), British women's rights activist
- João Pedro Cravinho (1964–), Portuguese diplomat and politician
- King Willem-Alexander of the Netherlands (1967–), Dutch monarch
- Eluned Morgan (1967–), the first female First Minister of Wales and former leader of Welsh Labour
- Luke Harding (1968–), British journalist
- Michiel van Hulten (1969–), Dutch politician
- Elsie Effah Kaufmann (1969–), Ghanaian academic and biomedical engineer
- Saba Douglas-Hamilton (1970–), Kenyan wildlife conservationist and television presenter
- Jakob von Weizsäcker (1970–), German politician and economist
- Louise Leakey (1972–), Kenyan palaeontologist and anthropologist
- Wangechi Mutu (1972–), Kenyan-American artist and sculptor
- Horatio Clare (1973–), British author
- Andreas Loewe (1973–), German-Australian priest and historian
- Erik Varden (1974–), Norwegian Catholic bishop of Trondheim
- Maciej Golubiewski (1976–), Polish political scientist and diplomat, Consul General of Poland in New York City
- Sally El Hosaini (1976–), Welsh-Egyptian film director and screenwriter
- E. Tendayi Achiume (1982–), Zambian academic
- Princess Raiyah bint Hussein of Jordan (1986–), member of the Jordanian royal family
- Léa Steinacker (1989–), German journalist, academic, and entrepreneur
- Princess Elisabeth, Duchess of Brabant (2001–), member of the Belgian royal family
- Leonor, Princess of Asturias (2005–), member of the Spanish royal family
- Princess Alexia of the Netherlands (2005–), member of the Dutch royal family
- Countess Leonore of Orange-Nassau (2006–), member of the Dutch royal family
- Infanta Sofia of Spain (2007–), member of the Spanish royal family
