= Desmond Hoare =

Desmond Hoare may refer to:

- Desmond Hoare (Royal Navy officer) (died 1988), British sailor & educator
- Des Hoare (born 1934), Australian cricketer
