= Adrian Kubicki =

Polish diplomat and businessman (born 1987)

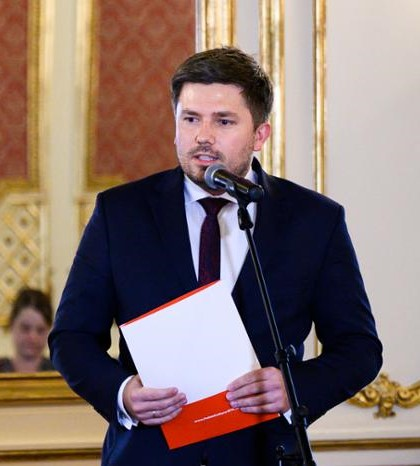
- Adrian Kubicki
- Born: 1987 (age 38–39); Toruń, Poland
- Citizenship: Polish
- Education: University of Warsaw; Collegium Civitas
- Occupations: diplomat, businessman
- Title: Consul General of Poland in New York City
- Term: 2020–present
- Predecessor: Maciej Golubiewski

Adrian Kubicki (born 1987) is a Polish diplomat, sociologist, and expert in public relations and communication. From 2016 to 2019 he was the Communications Director of LOT Polish Airlines. From 2019 to 2020 he was the Director of the Polish Cultural Institute in New York. Since 2020, he has served as the Consul General of Poland in New York City.

== Early and personal life ==
Kubicki was born in Toruń, Poland. He graduated from the University of Warsaw with a B.A. in Social Sciences. He then graduated from Collegium Civitas in Warsaw, Poland, with a Master of Arts in Foreign Relations. He specialized in negotiations, mediation, and conflict resolution.

Kubicki and his wife Anna, a doctor, have two daughters.

== Career ==
=== Early years ===
For seven years Kubicki worked as a journalist for one of the largest radio stations in Poland, and also wrote as a journalist for National Geographic Traveler.

=== Spokesperson for LOT Polish Airlines ===
In 2014 he joined LOT Polish Airlines, the flag carrier of Poland, working first as its International Public Relations Manager in its Communications Department. Beginning in 2016, he then worked for the airline as its Spokesperson, Communications Director, and Executive Director He left the airline in August 2019, after more than five years.

=== Director of the Polish Cultural Institute in New York ===
In August 2019 he joined the Polish Foreign Service at the Polish Ministry of Foreign Affairs, received a consular title. He was appointed to a four-year term as Director of the Polish Cultural Institute in New York, part of Poland's diplomatic mission to the United States, specializing in public diplomacy.

=== Consul General of Poland in New York City ===
In January 2020, Kubicki was officially nominated by the Foreign Affairs Minister of Poland to become the Consul General of Poland in New York City. He was presented by the deputy Foreign Affairs Minister of Poland, Szymon Szynkowski vel Sęk, and approved at his hearing before the Commission for Liaison with Poles Abroad of the Parliament of Poland the following month.

His candidacy was approved by the Prime Minister of Poland, Mateusz Morawiecki, and he became the youngest New York consul general in the history of the post. He also became, at 33 years of age, the youngest consul general in the history of the Third Polish Republic. He took over the post on March 4, 2020, at an inauguration ceremony attended by the Marshal of the Sejm of the Republic of Poland, Elżbieta Witek. He replaced Maciej Golubiewski.
