= Seppo Honkapohja =

Finnish economist

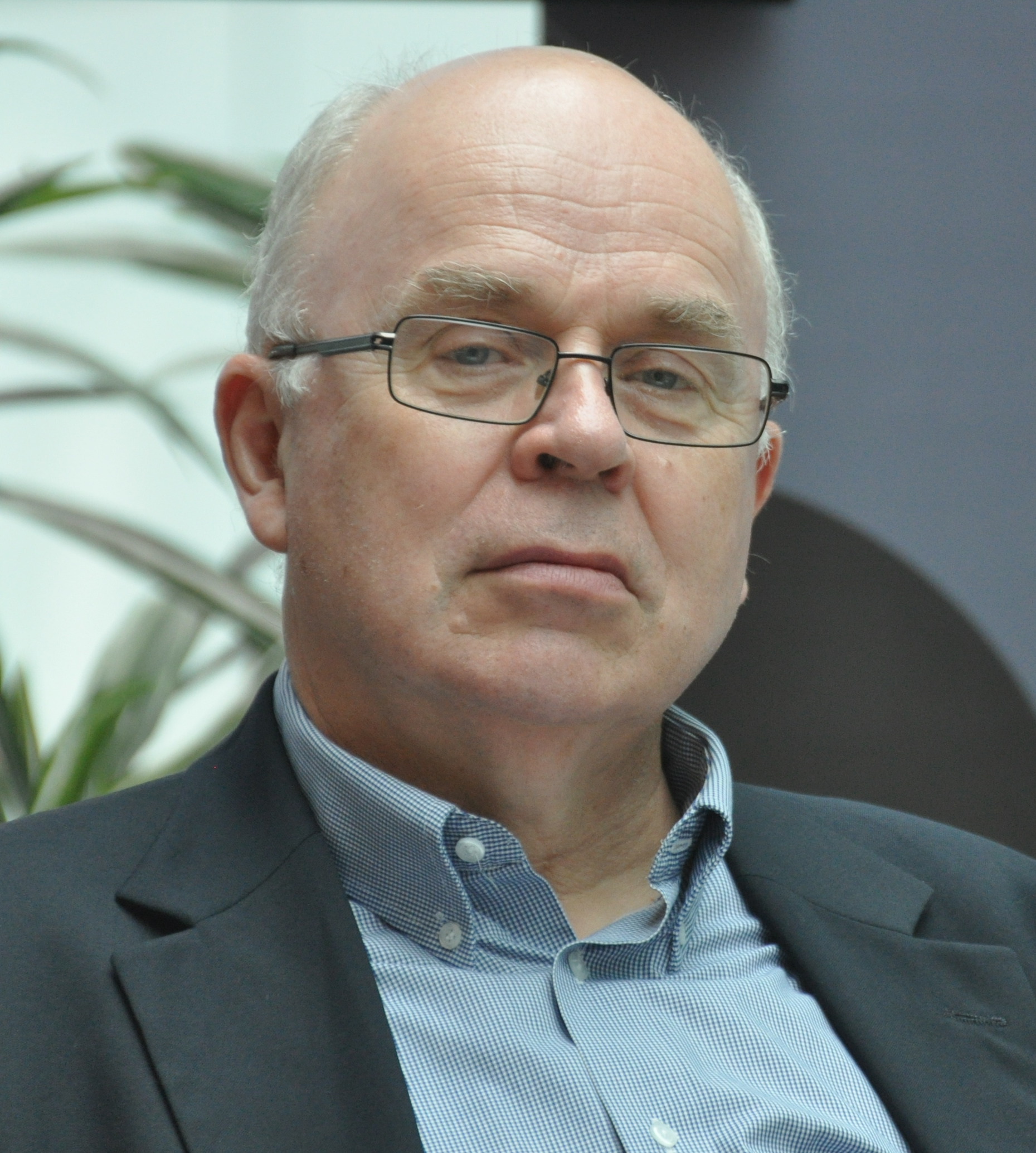
Finnish economist Seppo Honkapohja at Suomi Areena in Pori, 2014.

Seppo Mikko Sakari Honkapohja (born 7 March 1951 in Helsinki) is a Finnish economist. He is a board member of the Bank of Finland and former Professor of International Macroeconomics of the University of Cambridge.

== Career ==
After receiving his International Baccalaureate at the United World College of the Atlantic in Wales, Seppo Honkapohja went to the University of Helsinki to get a M.Soc.Sc., the Licentiate of Soc.Sc. and in 1979 a D.Soc.Sc.

From 1975 to 1987 Honkapohja was Scientific Director in the Yrjö Jahnsson Foundation. Until 1991 he then was Professor of Economics at the Turku School of Economics and Business Administration. In 1992 he joined the University of Helsinki as Professor of Economics. In addition he was Academy Professor of the Academy of Finland from 2000 to 2004. From 2004 until 2007 he was Professor of International Macroeconomics and fellow of Clare College, University of Cambridge. He researched on modelling of learning and expectations, bounded rationality and their implications for monetary and fiscal policy.

Since 1 January 2008, Seppo Honkapohja is a member of the board of the Finnish central bank with responsibility for research, information technology and Bank of Finland's own investments.

== Honours ==
- Member of the Academia Europaea (since 1990)
- Member of the Finnish Academy of Science and Letters (since 1991) and Chairman of the Social Science Group (1997–2002)
- Fellow of the Econometric Society (since 1999)
- Fellow of the European Economic Association (since 2004)
- Jaakko Honko Medal by Helsinki School of Economics and Business Administration 1998
- Doctor of Science h.c. in Economics and Business Administration, Turku School of Economics (2010)

== Publications ==
- List of publications at the Central Bank of Finland
- Seppo Honkapohja (2009), Economic prosperity recaptured: the Finnish path from crisis to rapid growth (in German), Cambridge, Mass.: MIT Press, ISBN 978-0-262-01269-0
- George W. Evans; Seppo Honkapohja (2001), Learning and expectations in macroeconomics (in German), Princeton, N.J.: Princeton University Press, ISBN 0-691-04921-1
- Seppo Honkapohja (1993), The crisis of the Finnish econom (in German), Helsinki: Dept. of Economics, ISBN 951-45-6419-7
- Seppo Honkapohja (1989), Information and incentives in organizations (in German), Oxford: Blackwell, ISBN 0-631-16424-3
- Kenneth Joseph Arrow; Seppo Honkapohja; Hilma Gabriella Jahnsson (1985), Frontiers of economics (in German), Oxford, UK: B. Blackwell, ISBN 0-631-13408-5
- Finn R. Førsund; Seppo Honkapohja (1985), Limits and problems of taxation (in German), New York: St. Martin's Press, ISBN 0-312-48684-7
