= David Voas =

British sociologist (born 1955)

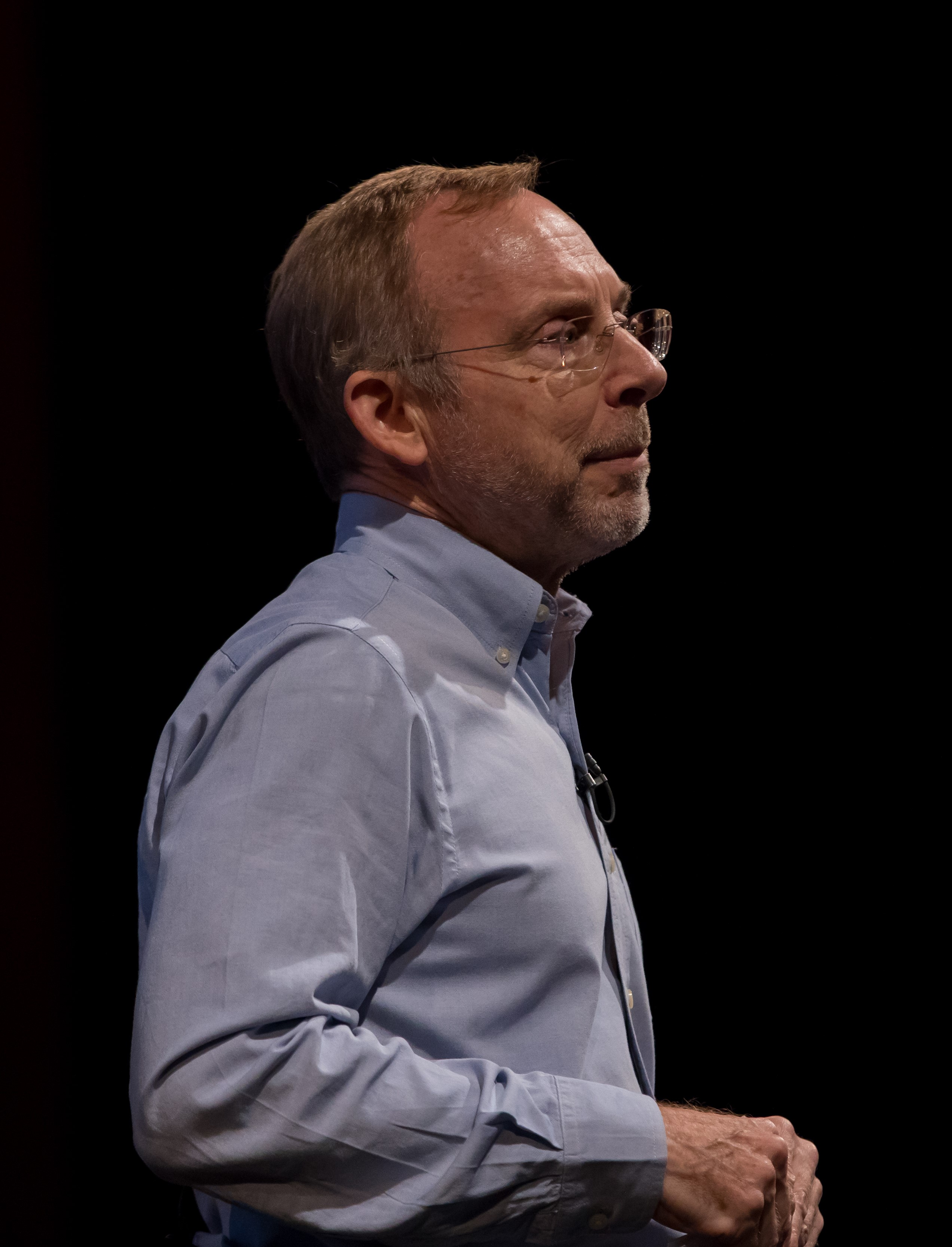
- Voas in November 2017
- Born: 1955 (age 70–71)

Academic background
- Education: Atlantic College; London School of Economics; University of Cambridge

Academic work
- Discipline: Demography
- Sub-discipline: Sociology of religion
- Institutions: University of Manchester; University of Essex; University College London

David Voas (born 1955) is a quantitative social scientist. He is currently Emeritus Professor of Social Science at University College London, where he led the Social Research Institute from 2016 to 2020. He was previously Professor of Population Studies at the University of Essex and Simon Professor of Population Studies at the University of Manchester.

Voas served on the executive committee of the European Values Study and on the council of the International Society for the Sociology of Religion. He is co-director of British Religion in Numbers, an online centre for British data on religion. He is on the editorial boards of the British Journal of Sociology and the Journal for the Scientific Study of Religion. His research concerns religious change and value change in modern societies, the intergenerational transmission of religion and values, and attitudes of and towards ethno-religious minorities.

== Early life ==
David Voas was born in the United States. His father is Robert B. Voas, a psychologist who had a key role in selecting and training the first group of NASA astronauts and in recent decades has been a leader in policy research on alcohol and highway safety. David Voas left the US at the age of 15 to attend Atlantic College, an international school in South Wales. He subsequently received bachelor's and master's degrees from London School of Economics and a PhD from Cambridge.

== Career ==
Voas worked in the private sector for a number of years and also spent extended periods outside the UK, particularly in France, the United States, and Bulgaria.

=== Academic career ===
He returned to academic life in 1998, first as a researcher at the University of Liverpool and subsequently as a lecturer at the University of Sheffield. He was awarded a Simon Research Fellowship at the University of Manchester in 2003 and remained there for eight years, first in the Cathie Marsh Centre for Census and Survey Research and later in the Institute for Social Change. In 2007, he was promoted to professor and given a chair in the Institute for Social Change, later merged into the Cathie Marsh Institute for Social Research.

Voas was Professor of Population Studies in the Institute for Social and Economic Research at the University of Essex from November 2011 to January 2016. He took up his present position at UCL in February 2016.
