= E. Tendayi Achiume =

American professor and politician

Professor E. Tendayi Achiume
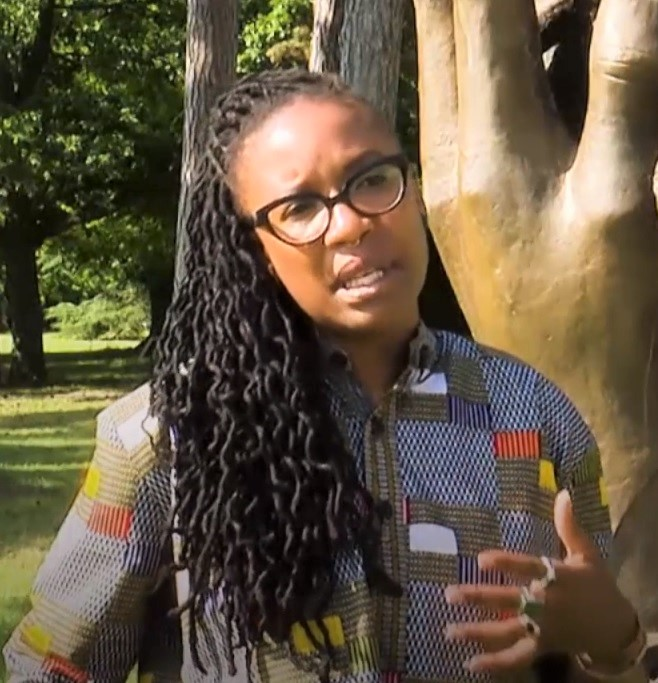
- E. Tendayi Achiume (2018)

Academic background
- Education: Atlantic College; Yale University; Yale Law School

E. Tendayi Achiume is a Professor of Law at Stanford University and former Faculty Director of the Promise Institute for Human Rights at the University of California, Los Angeles.

She served as the United Nations special rapporteur on Racism, Racial Discrimination, Xenophobia and Related Intolerance from her appointment in September 2017 until November 2022. She was the first woman appointed to this position since its creation in 1993.

== Early life and education ==
Achiume was born in Zambia. When she was growing up, Achiume had an inspirational physics teacher, and first considered a career in physics and engineering. She attended the United World College of the Atlantic in Wales, where she first became interested in political science and international law. Achiume earned her bachelor's degree at Yale University. She moved to the Yale Law School for her Juris Doctor, where she also earned a certificate in Development Studies. During her training she specialised in international migration and refugee rights. She was particularly interested in the humans rights abuses against Zimbabwean refugees who were seeking asylum in South Africa.

After earning her doctoral degree, Achiume moved to South Africa, where she worked as a legal clerk for Dikgang Moseneke and Justice Yvonne Mokgoro in the Constitutional Court of South Africa. She also served as a lecturer at the University of the Witwatersrand. At Atlantic College, Achiume initially took Higher Level subjects in physics and engineering but chose Standard Level Political Thought, where studying Hobbes, Locke, and Machiavelli sparked her interest in law and political science. She earned an International Baccalaureate Diploma there. At Yale University, she received a B.A. in Ethics, Politics and Economics in 2005, and spent her first year focusing on humanities and social sciences before pursuing law.

== Research and career ==
Following her positions as a legal clerk, she was awarded a Bernstein International Human Rights fellowship to join the migrant rights project at Johannesburg's Lawyers for Human Rights.

In 2014 Achiume joined the faculty at University of California, Los Angeles. At UCLA, Achiume leads the International Human Rights Clinic, a programme which teaches students international human rights through clinical projects. The projects led by Achiume include providing legal support for Indigenous peoples of the Americas, legal policies in Los Angeles and incarcerated women. As part of the programme, Achiume worked with Dignity and Power Now, an organisation in Los Angeles that looks to support incarcerated people and their families. She and her students looked at violations against incarcerated women of colour who suffered from mental illness. She demonstrated that these women were regularly denied physical or mental health support. She chaired the 2016 American Society of International Law annual meeting. In 2017 Achiume was appointed to the United Nations Human Rights Council as the UN special rapporteur on Racism, Racial Discrimination, Xenophobia and Related Intolerance. She was the first woman to hold such a position.

In 2018 Achiume visited the United Kingdom to study the prevalence of race crimes and how they were being exacerbated by Brexit. Her verdict was that the Home Office hostile environment policy had "entrenched racism" across the United Kingdom. She encouraged the Government of the United Kingdom to evaluate its policies on discrimination and to investigate the criminalisation of young Black men. Achiume identified that the anti-foreigner rhetoric that developed during the Leave.EU campaign was permeating society, and that austerity measures were disproportionately impacting communities of colour. In particular, she pointed out that "hateful and stigmatising discourse had become 'normalised' – even involving some high-ranking officials". This visit was documented in her first report to the United Nations General Assembly, in which she concluded that "ethnonationalist populism" posed a considerable threat to racial equality. In 2019, she benefited of the support of UCLA which received to this end a grant from the Ford Foundation, especially for research about raising issues from the Global South.

During the COVID-19 pandemic, Achiume studied the rise in racism and xenophobia that spread alongside SARS-CoV-2. In particular, she said that people perceived to be of Chinese or East Asian descent were subject to xenophobic attacks. Achiume emphasised the need for education in combating racism, and that racial and xenophobic discrimination should become a more substantial part of education.

On October 4, 2023, it was announced that Achiume had been awarded the MacArthur Fellowship for her work "reframing foundational concepts of international law at the intersection of racial justice and global migration."

In October 2023, Achiume signed a letter to Joe Biden condemning Israel’s bombardment and intensifying blockade of Gaza and calling for an immediate cease-fire. The letter was signed by legal scholars from some of the United States' most prestigious law faculties.

== Selected publications ==
- Achiume, E. Tendayi (2016-06-12). "Syria, Cost-sharing, and the Responsibility to Protect Refugees". UCLA: International Institute.
- Achiume, Tendayi (2013-07-16). "Beyond Prejudice: Structural Xenophobic Discrimination Against Refugees". Georgetown Journal of International Law. 45 (3): 323–381. SSRN 2294557.
- Achiume, E. Tendayi (2019-06-01). "Migration as Decolonization". Stanford Law Review. 71 (6): 1509–1574. ISSN 0038-9765.
- Achiume, E. Tendayi (2017). "Reimagining International Law for Global Migration: Migration as Decolonization?". AJIL Unbound. 111: 142–146. doi:10.1017/aju.2017.48. ISSN 2398-7723. S2CID 148772268.
