= Ulrich Meyer-Bothling =

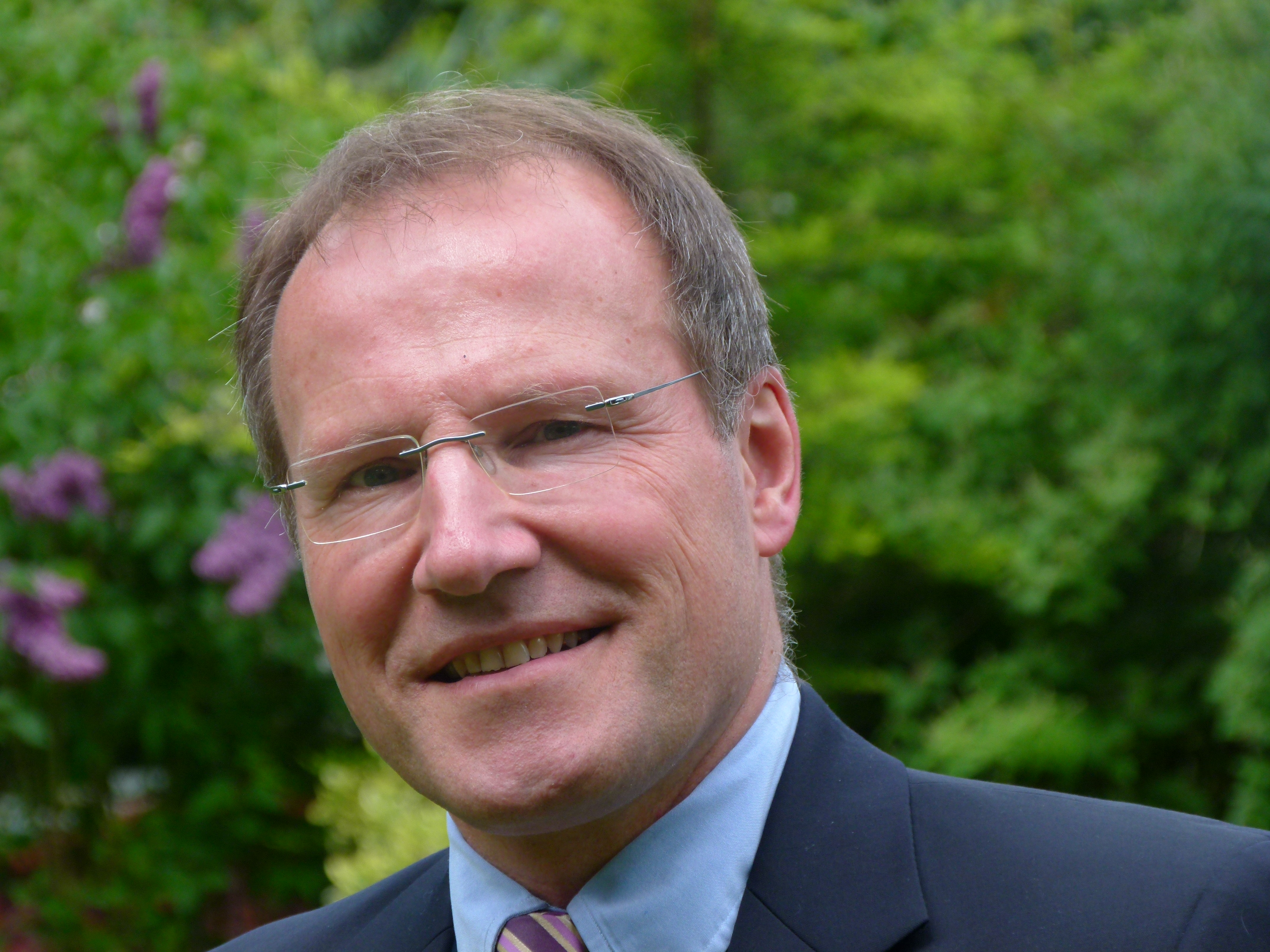
Ulrich Meyer-Bothling

Ulrich Meyer-Bothling is a British ophthalmic surgeon and research scientist. He is founding member and past Clinical Director of the Diabetic Retinopathy Screening service for Surrey.

Meyer-Bothling is a senior consultant eye surgeon who practises in the South East of England, United Kingdom. He has a research background in glaucoma and diabetic retinopathy and specialist training in retinal diseases. He specialises in complex cataract surgery and already in the 1990s he began publishing the advantages of performing small incision cataract surgery under topical anaesthesia.

== Education ==
Meyer-Bothling spent his childhood in France, where his parents were accredited with the diplomatic service, and later in Germany. In 1980 ,he won a scholarship to attend the sixth form United World College of the Atlantic in Wales, UK, from which he graduated with the International Baccalaureate. Meyer-Bothling then attended the University of Hamburg to study Medicine. He studied Haematology at the University of Rochester (USA), Neurology at the University of Oxford, Infectious diseases at Yale University and General Surgery at the University of Melbourne. He then completed his dual MD/PhD degree.

== Professional work ==
For his research on T-Lymphocyte subsets in Myasthenia gravis Meyer-Bothling received a PhD (magna cum laude) from the University of Hamburg.

From 1990 to 1992, Meyer-Bothling was a research fellow at the Nuffield Laboratory of Ophthalmology in Oxford. He was awarded a Master of Science from the University of Oxford for exploring the role of serotonin and related substances in the regulation of intraocular pressure.

His clinical residency was spent at the University of Hamburg, where he left in 1997 as a specialist in retinal surgery. He became one of three partners in a large day surgery centre in Hamburg. This practice of three eye surgeons performed over 3000 surgical procedures every year.

In 2000, Meyer-Bothling left Hamburg to do further clinical work and research as a fellow at Moorfields Eye Hospital in London.

In 2002, he was appointed Consultant Ophthalmic Surgeon by Ashford and St. Peter’s Hospitals NHS Trust, where he runs speciality services in cataract, glaucoma and diabetic retinopathy. Meyer-Bothling has a wide referral base for his private practice, which operates from various locations in Surrey, Middlesex and West London.

In 2008, Meyer-Bothling was appointed Clinical Director of the Diabetic Retinopathy Screening Service in Surrey, a post which he held for several years.

Meyer-Bothling has published his scientific research, in his early years predominantly glaucoma related (Neurobiology of Serotonin), later he published mainly clinical research. He co-authored the standard textbook "Emergency Medicine" (ophthalmology section), which is now in its fifth edition, and the OPHDA Ophthalmology databank.

== Degrees and awards ==
- International Baccalaureate
- MD, University of Hamburg
- PhD, University of Hamburg
- MSc, University of Oxford
- FRCOphth, London
- Scholarship by the Studienstiftung des deutschen Volkes to attend the United World College of the Atlantic, Wales, 1980–82.
- Grant by the German Academic Exchange Service to study at the University of Melbourne/ Australia, 1988.
- Scholarship by the Royal Society and the Deutsche Forschungsgemeinschaft to perform research at the University of Oxford, 1990–92.
- "Glaxo Junior Research Fellow" at Green College, Oxford, 1991–92.
- Research grant from the Claere-Jung-Stiftung, 1996.

== Extracurricular activities ==
Meyer-Bothling has travelled widely throughout Europe, Asia, the Americas, Africa and Australia. During his student and early residency years he regularly worked as a tour guide in China. He speaks English, French and German. He is a keen keyboard player (organ, piano and accordion), enjoys hiking and sailing and is an avid skier. Over the past years Meyer-Bothling and his family have financially supported the United World Colleges, Green Templeton College, Oxford (UK), the Eastman School of Music, the Hochstein School of Music & Dance and the Al Sigl Rehabilitation Center (USA). He is married with four children and lives in Surrey/England.

== Selected publications ==
- Meyer-Bothling U, Osborne NN, Bron AJ: Further evidence for the role of serotonin in the front of the eye. Documenta Ophthalmologica 80(3):226, 1991.
- Meyer-Bothling U, Barnett NL, Bron AJ, Osborne NN: Serotonin effects on the iris ciliary body and intraocular pressure in the rabbit. Invest Ophthalmol Vis Sci (Suppl.)33(4):1179, 1992.
- Meyer-Bothling U, Bron AJ, Osborne NN: Topical serotonin or the 5-HT1a-agonist 5-CT increase intraocular pressure in rabbits. Invest Ophthalmol Vis Sci 34:3035–3042, 1993.
- Osborne NN, Meyer-Bothling U, Barnett NL: Serotonin receptors in the eye. Chapter 12, pp. 331–364. In: Encounters in Glaucoma Research I: Receptor Biology and Glaucoma. Anderson DR, Drance SM (eds); Fogliazza Editore, 1994.
- Meyer-Bothling U, Bron AJ, Osborne NN: The Effect of indole-like compounds on rabbit intraocular pressure. Documenta Ophthalmologica 85(4):384, 1994.
- Meyer-Bothling U, Bron AJ, Osborne NN: Evidence for an adrenergic innervation of the rat Meibomian Glands. Invest Ophthalmol Vis Sci (Suppl.) 35(4):1789, 1994.
- Meyer-Bothling U, Bialasiewicz AA, Ma JX, Schaudig U: Substitution of conjunctival goblet cells by ileal mucosa grafting for severe mucus deficiency after xylamone lye burns. Documenta ophthalmologica 83:1995.
- Schaudig U, Ma JX, Bialasiewicz AA, Meyer-Bothling U: Secondary glaucoma and lymphocytic tumor infiltrates in necrotising malignant melanomas of the choroid. Der Ophthalmologe 92 Suppl 1,82,1995.
- Meyer-Bothling U, Bialasiewicz AA, Richard G: Acute retinal necrosis: two cases with giant retinal tear. Der Ophthalmologe 93 Suppl 1,110, 1996.
- Meyer-Bothling U, Bialasiewicz AA, Schaudig U, Richard G: Immunohistochemical identification of conjunctival human papilloma virus infections. Vision Research 36 Suppl, 10/1996.
- Richard G, Meyer-Bothling U: Editorial: Angioneogenesis – the key etiology in many cases of blindness. Klin Monatsbl Augenheilkd 208:III-IV. April 1996.
- Meyer-Bothling U: The first international glaucoma conference in Hamburg. Z prakt Augenheilkd 18:199–204, 1997.
- Meyer-Bothling U: Emergencies in ophthalmology, Ch. 26, Block C. In: Emergency Medicine. Kühn D, Luxem J, Rungaldier K, (eds); Verlag Urban & Schwarzenberg, Munich, 1998.
- Meyer-Bothling U: Pathological findings in ophthalmology. In: OPHDA – Ophthalmology Photo Databank. Alcon. Georg Thieme Verlag Stuttgart und Enke Verlag Stuttgart, 1998.
- Meyer-Bothling U, Jørgensen JS, Mann M: Topical anaesthesia: Alternative to retro- or parabulbar anaesthesia in cataract surgery. Ophthalmo-Chirurgie 10: 204–208, 1998.
- Meyer-Bothling U: Emergencies in ophthalmology, Ch. 26, Block C. In: Emergency Medicine, 2nd edition. Kühn D, Luxem J, Rungaldier K, (eds); Verlag Urban & Schwarzenberg, Munich, 2001.
- Meyer-Bothling U, Cunningham C: Converting to topical anaesthesia in cataract surgery. Poster, Annual Congress, Royal College of Ophthalmologists, Birmingham, May 2001.
- Meyer-Bothling U: Emergencies in ophthalmology, Ch. 26, "Specialised emergency medicine". In: Emergency Medicine, 3rd edition. Kühn D, Luxem J, Rungaldier K, (eds); Elsevier, Munich, 2004.
- M J Saldanha and U Meyer-Bothling: Outcome of implementing the national services framework guidelines for diabetic retinopathy screening: results of an audit in a primary care trust. Br J Ophthalmol Jan 2006;90:122.
- Meyer-Bothling U: Emergencies in ophthalmology, Ch. 26, In: Emergency Medicine today, 5th edition. Kühn D, Luxem J, Rungaldier K, (eds); Elsevier, Munich, 2010.
- Meyer-Bothling U, Meyer-Bothling O, Pinney M:A Real-World Single-Centre Study of Patients with Diabetic Macular Oedema Who Wore a Home-Use Sleep Mask (Noctura 400) for One Year. J Ophthalmol. 2021 Jun 15:2021:6612126.
- Farrar A, Hill D, Airey R, Pinney M, Livingstone K, Meyer-Bothling O, Grierson I and Meyer-Bothling U: Home-Use Sleep Mask (Noctura 400) Wear Before and During The COVID-19 Pandemic with its Associated Lockdowns in England. J Opto Ophth. 2022; 3(1):1-14.
