= Desmond Hoare (Royal Navy officer) =

Royal Navy Rear Admiral, and educator (1910–1988)

Rear admiral Desmond John Hoare CB (25 June 1910 – 26 April 1988) was a Royal Navy engineer officer, and educator.

== Biography ==
Hoare was educated at Wimbledon College and King's School, Rochester. He joined the Royal Navy in 1929 and after engineering training served in HMS Exeter 1936–1939, King George V on Arctic convoys 1942–1944 and Vanguard 1949–1951, and at the apprentice training establishment HMS Condor 1951–1953, besides spells at the Admiralty. His final post was Chief Staff Officer, Technical, to the Commander-in-Chief, Plymouth, 1960–1962. He was appointed CB in the 1962 New Year Honours.

In 1962 Hoare took early retirement from the Navy to become the first headmaster of Atlantic College. With the help of students he conceived, designed, and built what is now the world's most widely used craft for inshore rescue, the rigid inflatable boat (RIB). Hoare finally patented the design in 1973 and handed over all rights to the RNLI for the nominal fee of one pound. He did not cash the cheque.

He retired from his role as Headmaster at Atlantic College in 1969, taking on the position of Provost, which he held until retiring to Ireland in 1973. He died on 26 April 1988, and was buried in Saint Barrahane's Church cemetery in Castletownshend, County Cork, Ireland.
