= Consulate General of Poland, New York City =

Consulate General of the Republic of Poland in New York Konsulat Generalny Rzeczypospolitej Polskiej w Nowym Jorku

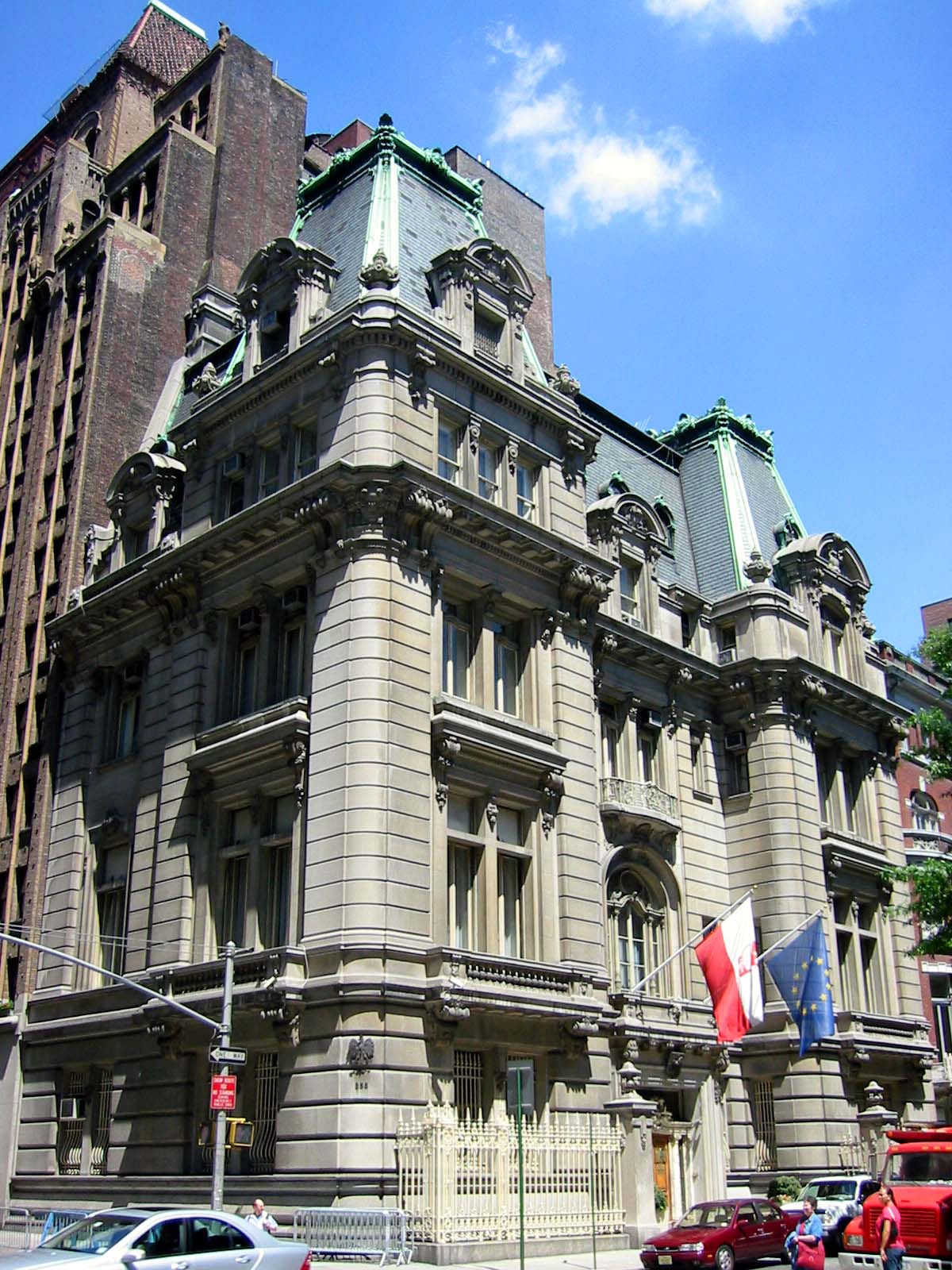
- The Joseph Raphael De Lamar House, seat of the Polish Consulate General in New York City
- Location: Madison Avenue, New York City, United States
- Address: 233 Madison Avenue (Jan Karski Corner), New York, NY 10016
- Coordinates: 40.7497°N 73.9812°W
- Inaugurated: August 14, 1919; 106 years ago
- Consul General: Mateusz Sakowicz
- Website: Official Website

The Consulate General of the Republic of Poland in New York City (Polish: Konsulat Generalny Rzeczypospolitej Polskiej w Nowym Jorku) is a diplomatic mission of the Republic of Poland in the United States. Established in 1919, it serves one of the largest Polish communities outside of Poland. The consulate is located in the historic Joseph Raphael De Lamar House, a Beaux-Arts mansion at 233 Madison Avenue in New York City.

== History ==
On August 14, 1919, the Consulate General of the Republic of Poland in New York City was inaugurated, preceding the establishment of the Embassy of Poland, Washington, D.C.. It was Poland's first diplomatic post established in the United States. The consulate supervised agents located in Boston, Philadelphia, and San Francisco.

During World War II, the consulate supported the Polish government-in-exile and Polish citizens abroad. It also hosted "Estezet," a Polish intelligence outpost operating under the Second Department of the Polish General Staff from 1941 to 1945.

In July 1945, Consul General Sylwin Strakacz resigned in protest against the communist Provisional Government of National Unity.

During the early Cold War, operations were suspended from 1954 to 1959 following U.S. government restrictions. The consulate resumed operations in 1970, initially functioning from a different location.

In 1972, the Polish government purchased the historic Joseph Raphael De Lamar House for $900,000 to reestablish the Consulate General. The consulate officially reopened at this location in 1973.

In the 1980s, the consulate became a center for political demonstrations during the Solidarity movement and Poland’s imposition of martial law.

In 1989, the consulate was designated as a polling station for the historic free parliamentary and presidential elections held in Poland, allowing the Polish diaspora in the United States to participate.

In November 2007, a life-size statue of Jan Karski was installed near the consulate entrance as a memorial.

Throughout the 1990s and 2000s, the consulate underwent extensive renovations, preserving its Beaux-Arts features while modernizing facilities. The consulate now hosts cultural events, exhibitions, and concerts open to the Polish-American community and the broader public.

== Functions and Activities ==
The Consulate General provides services for Polish citizens and Polish-Americans across its eight-state jurisdiction. Main functions include:

- Processing visa applications and passports
- Providing consular protection and legal assistance
- Organizing voting in Polish elections abroad
- Supporting Polish language education, cultural institutions, and Polish heritage
- Promoting trade, business cooperation, and academic exchange
- Coordinating cultural diplomacy
- Assisting with repatriations, citizenship confirmations, and registry matters

== Building and Premises ==
The consulate initially operated from 40 West 40th Street (1919), moved to 953 Third Avenue (1922–1930), then to 149–151 East 67th Street (1930–1945). Since 1973, it has occupied the historic Joseph Raphael De Lamar House.

== Consular District ==
The Consulate General serves Polish citizens and diaspora members across Connecticut, Maine, Massachusetts, New Hampshire, New Jersey, New York, Rhode Island, and Vermont.

== Consuls General of the Republic of Poland in New York ==
=== Second Polish Republic ===
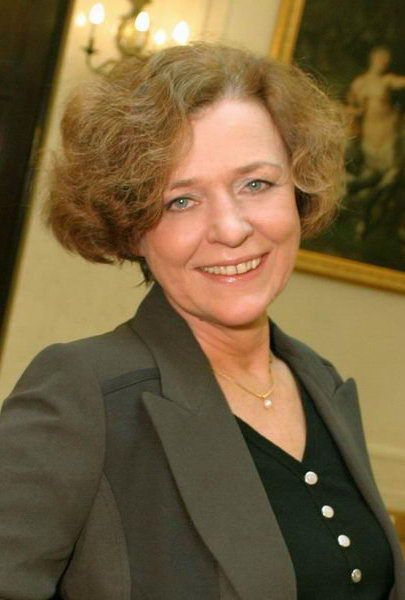
Ewa Junczyk-Ziomecka

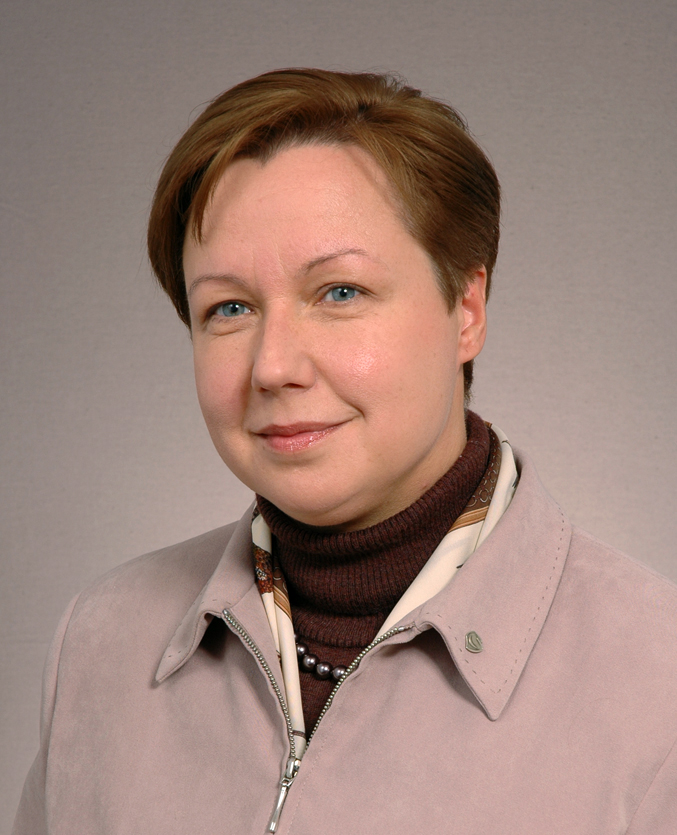
Urszula Gacek

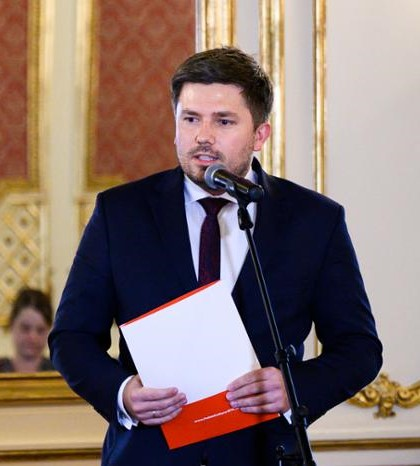
Adrian Kubicki

- 1919 – Konstanty Buszczyński
- 1919–1920 – Jerzy Barthel de Weydenthal, Consul
- 1920 – Zdzisław Kurnikowski, Consul
- 1920–1925 – Stefan Ludwik Grotowski
- 1925–1928 – Sylwester Gruszka
- 1928 – Tadeusz Marynowski, Consul
- 1928–1929 – Eugeniusz Rozwadowski
- 1929–1935 – Mieczysław Marchlewski
- 1935 – Jerzy Matusiński
- 1935–1940 – Sylwester Gruszka
- 1941–1945 – Sylwin Strakacz

=== Polish People's Republic ===
- 1945–1947 – Eugeniusz Rozwadowski, acting head of the Consulate
- 1947–1953 – Jan Galewicz
- 1954–1959 – closure of the Consulate; activities suspended
- 1970 – re-establishment of the Consulate
- 1970–1974 – Kazimierz Ciaś
- 1975–1978 – Zbigniew Dembowski
- 1979 – Maksymilian Służewski, Consul
- 1979–1981 – Kazimierz Ciaś
- 1981–1985 – Waldemar Lipka-Chudzik
- 1985–1989 – Andrzej Olszówka

=== Third Polish Republic ===
- 1990–1996 – Jerzy Surdykowski
- 1997–2001 – Dariusz Jadowski
- 2001–2005 – Agnieszka Magdziak-Miszewska
- 2005–2010 – Krzysztof Kasprzyk
- 2010–2014 – Ewa Junczyk-Ziomecka
- 2014–2016 – Urszula Gacek
- 2017–2019 – Maciej Golubiewski
- 2020–2024 – Adrian Kubicki
- 2024–present – Mateusz Sakowicz

== See also ==
- Foreign relations of Poland
- List of diplomatic missions of Poland
- Poland–United States relations
- Joseph Raphael De Lamar House
