= Fernando Alonso (engineer) =

Spanish test pilot and engineer

- Born: Fernando Alonso Fernández; 1956 (age 69–70); Madrid, Spain
- Education: United World College of the Atlantic; Technical University of Madrid
- Engineering career
- Discipline: Aeronautical engineering
- Institutions: Airbus Defence and Space

Fernando Alonso Fernández (born March 11, 1956) is a retired flight test engineer. He was the Head of the Military Aircraft division of Airbus Defence and Space before he retired in 2019. He had been an Airbus employee since 1982. Until March 2015 he was Head of Flight and Integration Tests at Airbus. During his career, he has accumulated more than 3000 hours of test flights on new aircraft, such as the A318, A320, A330, A340, A340-600 and A350 XWB. He was part of the crew of the first ever A380 flight together with Jacques Rosay and four others.

== Early life and career ==
Alonso was born in Madrid, Spain, in 1956. He attended United World College of the Atlantic in Cardiff, Wales. He then graduated from Technical University of Madrid as an Aeronautical Engineer.

Alonso joined Airbus as a performance engineer in 1982. Between 1995 and 2002 he was responsible for the development of flight controls and handling qualities during the flight test programs of the A319, A330-200, A340-500 and A340-600. In February 2002 he was appointed as president of the flight test division.

After retiring from Airbus Fernando Alonso became visiting professor at Cranfield University.
