= Urszula Gacek =

Polish politician (born 1963)

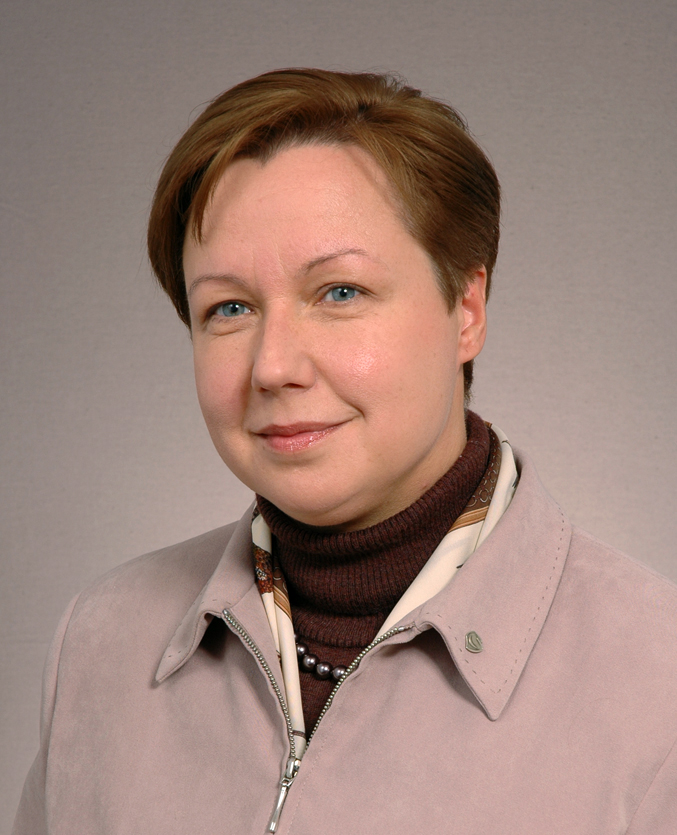

5th Poland Ambassador to the Council of Europe
- In office 2011–2014
- Preceded by: Piotr Świtalski
- Succeeded by: Janusz Stańczyk

Personal details
- Born: 17 March 1963 (age 63) Urmston, Lancashire, England
- Education: University of Oxford
- Profession: economist, politician, diplomat

Urszula Józefa Gacek (born 17 March 1963) is a Polish politician and a former member of the European Parliament, representing Civic Platform. Between 2014 and 2016 she was Consul General of the Republic of Poland in New York City.

== Early life ==
Gacek was born in Urmston, Lancashire, England, and studied at Oxford University. She then worked as a financial analyst and as an author of chemical and energy publications before entering politics.

== Political life ==
Gacek served as a member of the Polish Senate for the Civic Platform party between 2005 and 2007. In 2007 she became a Member of the European Parliament and sat with her colleagues in the EPP-ED group, serving, amongst others, on the Committee on Civil Liberties, Justice and Home Affairs and the Delegation for Relations with the USA. From 3 February 2011 to 30 November 2014 she was the Permanent Representative of the Republic of Poland to the Council of Europe.

Between 2014 and 2016 she was Consul General of the Republic of Poland in New York City.

She as of 2020 headed the Organization for Security and Co-operation in Europe's election observation mission to the United States.
