= Story of a Secret State =

1944 nonfiction book

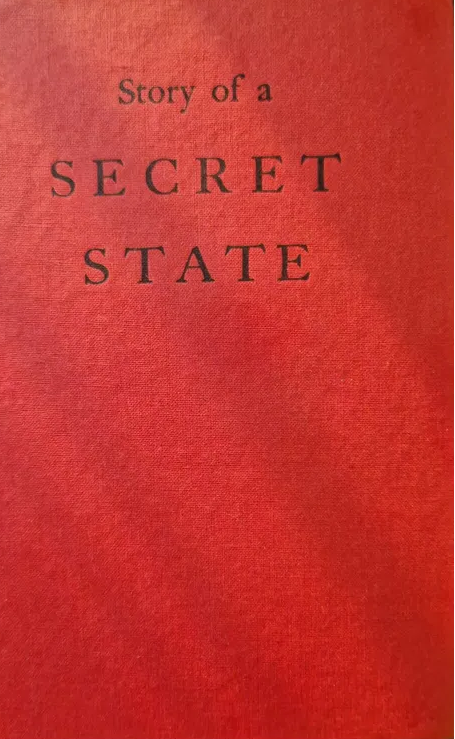
- Cover of the 1944 edition
- Author: Jan Karski
- Translator: Krystyna Sokołowska
- Publisher: Houghton Mifflin
- Publication date: 1944
- Publication place: United States
- Media type: Print
- Pages: 391
- OCLC: 3489326

Story of a Secret State (later republished under longer, titles, Courier from Poland: The Story of a Secret State and Story of a Secret State: My Report to the World) is a 1944 book by Polish resistance Home Army courier Jan Karski. First published in the United States in 1944, it narrates Karski's experiences with the Polish Secret State), and it is also one of the first book accounts of the German occupation of Poland, including the Holocaust in Poland.

The book became a best-seller in 1944. It helped to inform the American and Western public about the scope of active resistance in Poland, and it also has been described as one of the first accounts of the suffering of Poles and Polish Jews under the Nazi occupation, made available to the Western public.

== Background ==
Jan Karski was a Polish soldier, resistance-fighter, and diplomat during World War II. In 1940–1943 he acted as a Home Army informer to the Polish government-in-exile and to Poland's Western Allies, relaying information to them about the situation in German-occupied Poland. He reported about the state of Poland, its many competing resistance factions, and also about Germany's destruction of the Warsaw Ghetto and its operation of extermination camps on Polish soil that were murdering Jews, Poles, and others. One of his reports, "The Mass Extermination of Jews in German Occupied Poland", has been described as "one of the first accounts of the Holocaust and a desperate cry for help and rescue for the Jews". In 1982 he was recognized as one of the Polish Righteous Among the Nations.

In 1943 Karski visited the United States to meet President Roosevelt, and upon his second visit in the next year, he became convinced that the Western public, and leaders, were not grasping the enormity of the suffering of Poles and Jews under the Nazi occupation. He therefore decided to spread information about these topics by publishing a memoir of his experiences and to that end, partnered with the American literary agent Emery Reves, founder of Cooperation Publishing, which at that time released many anti-Nazi works. Reves set a number of conditions which shaped the book, from the first person, "eye-witness" narrative style, which he considered popular among the American readers, to the censorship-motivated avoidance of the controversial topic of Polish-Soviet relations (at that point, in 1944, the Soviets were one of the Allies, and the American government wanted to minimize the public confusion stemming from the fact that in 1939, the Soviets helped Germany by jointly invading and occupying Poland). While adhering to the American wartime pro-Soviet propaganda, the book was also not to be promoted by the Polish government-in-exile or any other Polish-American institutions.

Although Karski was the main author and the sole credited author of the work, he closely collaborated with the bilingual translator Krystyna Sokołowska (who translated his Polish manuscript to English) and the final script was copyedited by William Poster. The four hundred odd page manuscript was finished in July 1944 and published in the United States in November that year.

== The book ==
The book describes Karski's experiences beginning in 1939, the year of German invasion of Poland. Shortly after the occupation of Poland, Karski joined the Polish resistance, and became a courier, transporting messages from occupied Poland to the Polish government-in-exile, first in France and later in the United Kingdom. The final chapters of the book describe Karski's travels through Western Europe, and his meetings with many journalists and politicians in non-occupied Western countries, including Anthony Eden, British Secretary of State for Foreign Affairs, and President Roosevelt in the United States. Karski described his goals as to "reproduce objectively what he saw, what he experienced, and what he was bidden to tell about those in Poland and the other occupied countries of the world".

== Editions and translations ==
The book was first published in English in the US (by Houghton Mifflin) in 1944 and in the UK in 1945. The book received another English edition in 2011. The book was quickly translated to Swedish (1945) and Icelandic (1945). It also received a French translation in 1948 (and a revised one in 2010).

Because of Karski's association with the Home Army, his story and the book itself were subject to communist censorship in the People's Republic of Poland. For that reason, it was not published in Poland until a decade after the fall of communism. The first official release of this work in Polish (a translation of the English book) was finally released in 1999, with revisions by the historian Waldemar Piasecki and Karski himself. In fact, initially, Karski did not see the need to publish a Polish translation of the book at all, as he was convinced it was aimed at the international audience. Karski considered the 1944 first edition a necessary simplification for the global audience, and the revised edition from 1999, while sometimes labelled a translation, contains some major changes and has been also described a significant rewriting of the original version. A second revised edition was published in Poland in 2014.

The second edition corrects some errors, such as the misidentification of the transit camp near Izbica Lubelska as the main Bełżec death camp. Karski also noted that in the first edition, he purposefully falsified the identity of a guard who escorted him into that camp (changing his true Ukrainian nationality into Estonian), in an attempt to avoid pointing to Ukrainians as Germans' accomplices in the extermination of the Jews because of the complex Polish-Ukrainian relations. The first edition also minimized the complexity of the Polish-Jewish relations, both to avoid confusing the readers and to avoid damaging these relations. In effect, as noted by the historian Joanna Rzepa, the first edition "presented a relatively black-and-white picture of World War II, with Poles and Jews struggling for survival under the Nazi regime".

Other translations include Norwegian, German (in 2011), Dutch, Spanish and Catalan. Due to a Soviet Union propaganda campaign against Karski, some translations were cancelled or delayed (these included among others Hebrew and Arabic). The Russian edition was finally published in 2012.

Some later editions in English use longer titles and/or subtitles, such as Courier from Poland: The Story of a Secret State and Story of a Secret State: My Report to the World.

== Reception ==
Upon publication, the book sold more than 15,000 copies in the first two weeks, and overall, more than 350,000 copies in the United States, and was described as a bestseller in 1944. It received generally positive reviews in American mainstream press of that time, with coverage in outlets such as The New York Times, the New York Herald Tribune, the Los Angeles Times and Time.

The book was also well received in academia. Kalman Stein, who reviewed the book in 1945 for Jewish Social Studies, wrote that the book is a "well written and moving" account of the suffering of Poles and Polish Jews, and praised it for the "widely acknowledged...qualities of the narrative". That same year, Joseph S. Roucek reviewed the book for Military Affairs, concluding that it is "an extremely valuable documentary survey" of an underresearched topic, here, the operation of the underground and secret societies and movements. Another review from that year was penned by W. J. R. for International Affairs. The reviewer praised the work for explaining "the structure of the machinery of resistance", and predicted that it would become a classic.

Peter Conrad reviewed the new edition of this book for The Guardian in 2011, criticizing its writing style as "political melodrama" in the style of "a 40s espionage thriller", arguing that the outdated writing style obscures the valuable historical account of the underlying history, though at the same time he noted that parts of the book "resemble scenes tantalisingly directed by Hitchcock". On the other hand, Nigel Jones, who reviewed it that year for The Telegraph, noted that "it deserves its status as a Penguin Classic, not only because it is a great historic document, but also because it’s a cracking good read: Karski’s adventures are worthy of the wildest spy thriller". Marek Kohn in his review for The Independent, also that year, wrote that "Karski provides an astonishing insight into the operation of the secret Polish state", and that his story is "deeply welcome" and "deserves not just revival but reflection".

A reviewer for the Culture.pl portal also commented on Karski's writing style, saying that the work "reads like the screenplay to a war movie". Reviewing this edition for the Michigan War Studies Review in 2013, Donald Lateiner described it as "exciting but self-effacing" piece that still "has not lost its freshness".

== Analysis ==
In 1944, Karski's book sought to impact the discourse of Poland in Anglo-American politics in 1944. Karski, who met a number of British and American journalists in 1943, came to the conclusion that the Western Allied public saw Poles primarily as passive victims. Hence, one of his primary purposes was to educate the readers about the scope of the Polish resistance (one of the largest in World War II^{[a]}). The very name of the book, Story of a Secret State, refers to the Polish Secret State, a political and military entity formed by the union of resistance organizations in occupied Poland that were loyal to the Government of the Republic of Poland in exile in London, encompassed not only military resistance but also underground civilian structures, such as education, culture and social services.

== See also ==
- Warsaw Uprising
- Warsaw Ghetto Uprising

== Notes ==
a Several sources note that the Armia Krajowa was the largest resistance movement in Nazi-occupied Europe. For example, Norman Davies wrote "Armia Krajowa (Home Army), the AK, which could fairly claim to be the largest of European resistance"; Gregor Dallas wrote "Home Army (Armia Krajowa or AK) in late 1943 numbered around 400,000, making it the largest resistance organization in Europe"; Mark Wyman wrote "Armia Krajowa was considered the largest underground resistance unit in wartime Europe". Certainly, the Polish resistance was the largest resistance movement until the German invasion of Yugoslavia and the Soviet Union in 1941; in the last years of the war those two resistances would rival AK in its strength (see Resistance during World War II for a more detailed analysis). Compared to them, the size of the French resistance was smaller, numbering around 10,000 people in 1942, and swelling to 200,000 by 1944.
