= Senator Lamar (disambiguation) =

Lucius Quintus Cincinnatus Lamar II (1825–1893) was a U.S. Senator from Mississippi from 1877 to 1885. Senator Lamar may also refer to:

- Joseph Raphael De Lamar (1843–1918), Idaho State Senate
- Mirabeau B. Lamar (1798–1859), Georgia State Senate
- Lamar Alexander, former U.S. senator from Tennessee
