= Henry Faulkner =

American artist and poet (1924–1981)

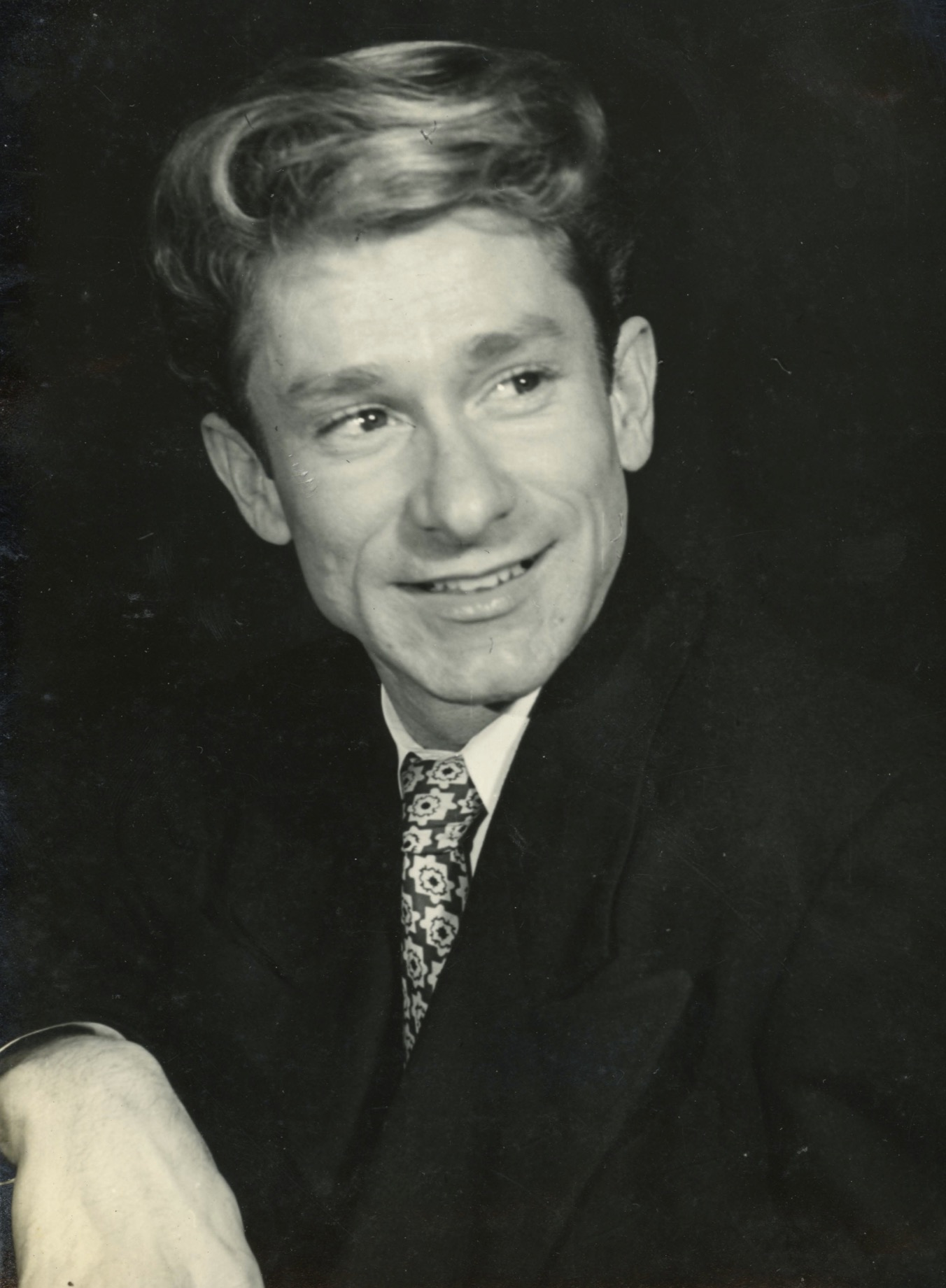
- Portrait of Henry Faulkner, 1950s
- Born: January 9, 1924; Simpson County, Kentucky, US
- Died: December 5, 1981 (aged 57); Lexington, Kentucky, US
- Known for: Painting, Poetry

Signature
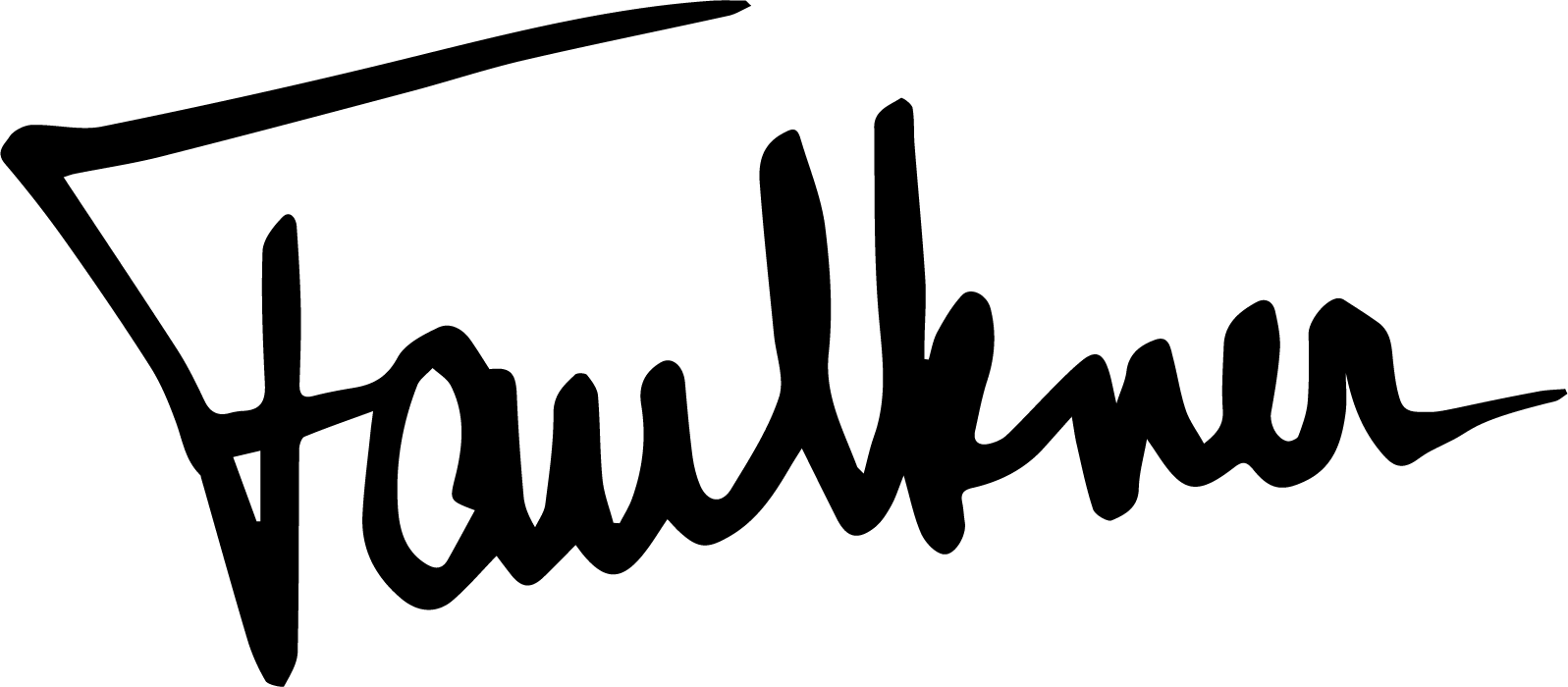

Henry Lawrence Faulkner (January 9, 1924 – December 5, 1981) was an American artist and poet. Faulkner's artistic experimentations range from mediums such as oil paintings and photography to outrageous and fun gatherings. For example, the usual appearance of his bourbon-drinking goat at different meetings and social events.

== Early life ==
Henry Lawrence Faulkner was born to Bessie and John Milton Faulkner on January 9, 1924, in Simpson County, Kentucky. He was Bessie and John's tenth child together. Henry was named after Bessie's high school boyfriends, not, as he later claimed, Henry VIII and the St. Lawrence River. After Bessie's death in 1926, John sent Henry and his siblings away to the Kentucky Children's Home, a Louisville orphanage.

At age four, in 1928, Henry Faulkner was taken in by a family in Western Kentucky. He lived on their poultry farm for only a short time before being sent back to the Home after Henry convinced his foster parents that a persistent case of ringworm on his head was actually a mysterious hereditary medical condition.

After another year at the Kentucky Children's Home, Henry Faulkner was shipped off to a second foster family in the mountain community of Clayhole in Breathitt County, Kentucky in 1929. After several months, Henry was sent back to the orphanage once again due to his peculiar nature, outcast state, and his foster father's reported tuberculosis (later discovered to be infectious-stage syphilis).

Henry's early life consisting of movement between orphanage homes around Kentucky led to his more sensitive and complex nature throughout the years. His experience inside new homes at a young age inspired his art and poetry later to come.

In 1930, Henry was adopted by Dan and Dora Whittimore and went to live with them on their 100-acre (40 ha) farm in Falling Timber Branch, a town fourteen miles north of Manchester in Clay County, Kentucky. His new family viewed art as "the devil's work" and Henry's effeminate and flamboyant personality often clashed with his adoptive father's standards. Ultimately, the Whittimores accepted Henry as their son and raised him as their own, yet were prone to occasional bouts of verbal and physical abuse. Henry ran away from home in 1938, making it all the way to Livingston before returning to Falling Timber Branch.

When Henry's nervousness and strange behavior strengthened, Dora Whittimore elected to return him to the Kentucky Children's Home temporarily in 1939. She hoped a stay in the city would straighten him out. Henry alternated between living at the Children's Home and Falling Timber Branch until he was enrolled in the Louisville Junior Art School with scholarship funding that same year.

After getting arrested for shoplifting perfume, powder, and other small feminine articles (which Faulkner said were for a girlfriend, but were much more likely to have been for female impersonation, a trade he continued through the 1940s), he was placed with his older brother Harvey and his wife Ida in a working-class neighborhood across the street from Churchill Downs. Ida left Harvey in 1940 and soon after, Henry was moved to a boarding house on Southern Parkway in Louisville, Kentucky under the kind auspices of Mrs. G.M. Wilson. Faulkner started shoplifting again shortly after. A visit from his sister prompted him to spend time traveling to places he had previously sojourned. When he returned to Louisville, Mrs. Wilson would no longer take responsibility for him.

Several itinerant months followed, including another stint at the Kentucky Children's Home after another run-in with the law. Henry Faulkner was released from the custody of the state on May 6, 1942, and left Kentucky. He would eventually return.

== Personal life ==
In the late 1940s, Faulkner lived with Thomas Painter and Kentucky-born artist Edward Melcarth in New York City for a short period of time following World War II. It is said they both shared relationships of multiple varieties with the same groups of people.

Faulkner was known for his admiration of animals. According to Bradley Picklesimer, who previously lived with Faulkner, "This man lived in his house with at any given time 12–15 goats, six or seven dogs, and probably 20 cats in the house." His most notable, and remembered, pet was a goat named Alice. The goat was named after Faulkner's friend Alice DeLamar, a well-known lesbian heiress, and was rumored to enjoy drinking bourbon.

Faulkner was among the pioneers of the mid-century LGBTQ+ scene in Kentucky, often dressing in drag, and was referred to as a "decorative pillar of the gay community." In 1942, Faulkner was placed in St. Elizabeth's Psychiatric Hospital for 11 months due to his homosexuality, which was regarded as a mental illness at the time.

In the later part of his life, Henry Faulkner lived in a house on Third Street in Lexington, Kentucky. Still noted for his outgoingness and characteristic quirks as quoted by others. His close relationships with local figures such as Sweet Evening Breeze and other people who documented the LGBTQ+ community made Faulkner a reasonably prominent figure within the Kentucky LGBTQ community.

== Career ==
=== Painting ===
Faulkner began to display his artwork more frequently around 1959, around the time of his alleged relationship with Tennessee Williams. In this period, viewers were exposed to the stylistic aspects of Faulkner's vibrant and bold landscape compositions. Faulkner's paintings' subjects ranged from landscapes of Italian and Californian scenery to portraits of people and animals. Faulkner often depicts flowers in his paintings, an obsession possibly stemming from the flowers displayed at his mothers' funeral when Henry was two years old. His more notable works portray abstract versions of Kentucky landscapes. Elements from these spaces are placed together in a highly stylized composition. The design and technical qualities depicted in his paintings have been associated with artistic movements such as Surrealism and his linework bears some similarities to Colorist principles.

Faulkner created and presented paintings in several locations, including Kentucky, Florida, New York, and Italy. He most often traveled between Lexington, Kentucky and cities such as Key West and Palm Beach, in Florida, where he met a variety of artists, including Tennessee Williams, Bertolt Brecht, and James Leo "Jamie" Herlihy. Faulkner established connections with galleries through shows and selling his pieces. In 1957, he sold one piece to the Collectors of American Art and five pieces to the Caravan Gallery for a summer group show. One gallery connection led him to travel in Italy as a participant in the Galleria XXII Marzo of Venice in 1962. The owners of this gallery also had a location in Palm Beach, Florida–which Faulkner frequented. His work was so well received in Italy that afterwards, in July 1962, he was a part of a tour of northern Italian cities in a catalogue titled "Eight Florida Artists."

Upon returning to the United States he returned to Falling Timber to ponder his experiences in Italy. In 1963, Faulkner began to take annual trips to Florida from Lexington, Kentucky. These trips occurred every winter until his death in 1981. In 1965, to accommodate for his annual trips, he bought a winter home in Key West, Florida.

=== Poetry ===
Faulkner applied for a Guggenheim Fellowship in poetry in 1958. He was heavily supported by Bertolt Brecht, who wrote a letter in support of Faulkner to the Guggenheim Foundation and Herlihy. Around this time, Faulkner met Tennessee Williams, a two time Pulitzer winner who was described as Faulkner's "soulmate."

In September the following year, Faulkner's Guggenheim Fellowship application was denied.

== Death and legacy ==
Henry Faulkner Mural, painted by Wylie Caudill, 2026. Located at 162 Church Street, Lexington, Kentucky.

Faulkner died on December 5, 1981, at the age of 57, in a car crash in Lexington, Kentucky, when he was struck by a drunk driver. After his death, Faulkner left his property to various friends. He willed his Lexington home to Alice DeLamar, his Clay County farm to Tennessee Williams, his Jackson County farm to James Leo Herlihy, his Scott County farm to his niece Mildred Faulkner, his Key West home to Stefan Brecht, his Sicily home to Daphne Phelps, and his poetry to Bette Davis. The rest of his belongings were auctioned off on June 18, 1983.

Faulkner's legacy consists of his personal artwork and his influence on other artists. The Kinsey Institute in Bloomington, Indiana houses 200 of his photographs. The Faulkner Morgan Archive, a Lexington non-profit, has an additional 2,000 of Faulkner's photographs. Faulkner's paintings have appeared in exhibitions nationwide both during and after his life in addition to exhibitions in Paris, France at the Raymond Duncan Art Gallery. In November 2022, thirteen of Faulkner's works were sold in Cross Gate Gallery's tenth annual Sporting Arts Auction at Keeneland in Lexington. The Headley-Whitney Museum in Lexington, Kentucky presented an exhibition of Henry Faulkner's works, which included 100 pieces to celebrate Faulkner's 100th birthday. Within the exhibition, Faulkner's works were grouped by collection, paying homage the collectors who preserved his legacy. Faulkner's life inspired the documentary Under the Southern Cross created by Jean Donohue, which explores Lexington's queer history. He is also discussed prominently in a 2013 documentary film, Last Gospel of the Pagan Babies, a project of Media Working Group, also with Jean Donohue as producer and director. The film in turn inspired a collaboration between Donohue and the Faulkner Morgan Archive, a nonprofit organization based in Lexington, Kentucky, creating the Faulkner-Morgan Pagan Babies Archive. Faulkner also appears briefly in James Herlihy's memoir and may have been the inspiration for Tennessee Williams' play The Lingering Hour.

In October 2026, a mural located at 162 Church Street in downtown Lexington, Kentucky was created to honor Faulkner. The project was led by the Faulkner Morgan Archive and the mural itself was painted by Lexington artist Wylie Caudill. This was the first public artwork or landmark in the United States dedicated to the life and legacy of Faulkner.
