= Joseph Raphael De Lamar House =

Historic house in Manhattan, New York

- U.S. National Register of Historic Places
- U.S. Historic district – Contributing property
- New York State Register of Historic Places
- New York City Landmark
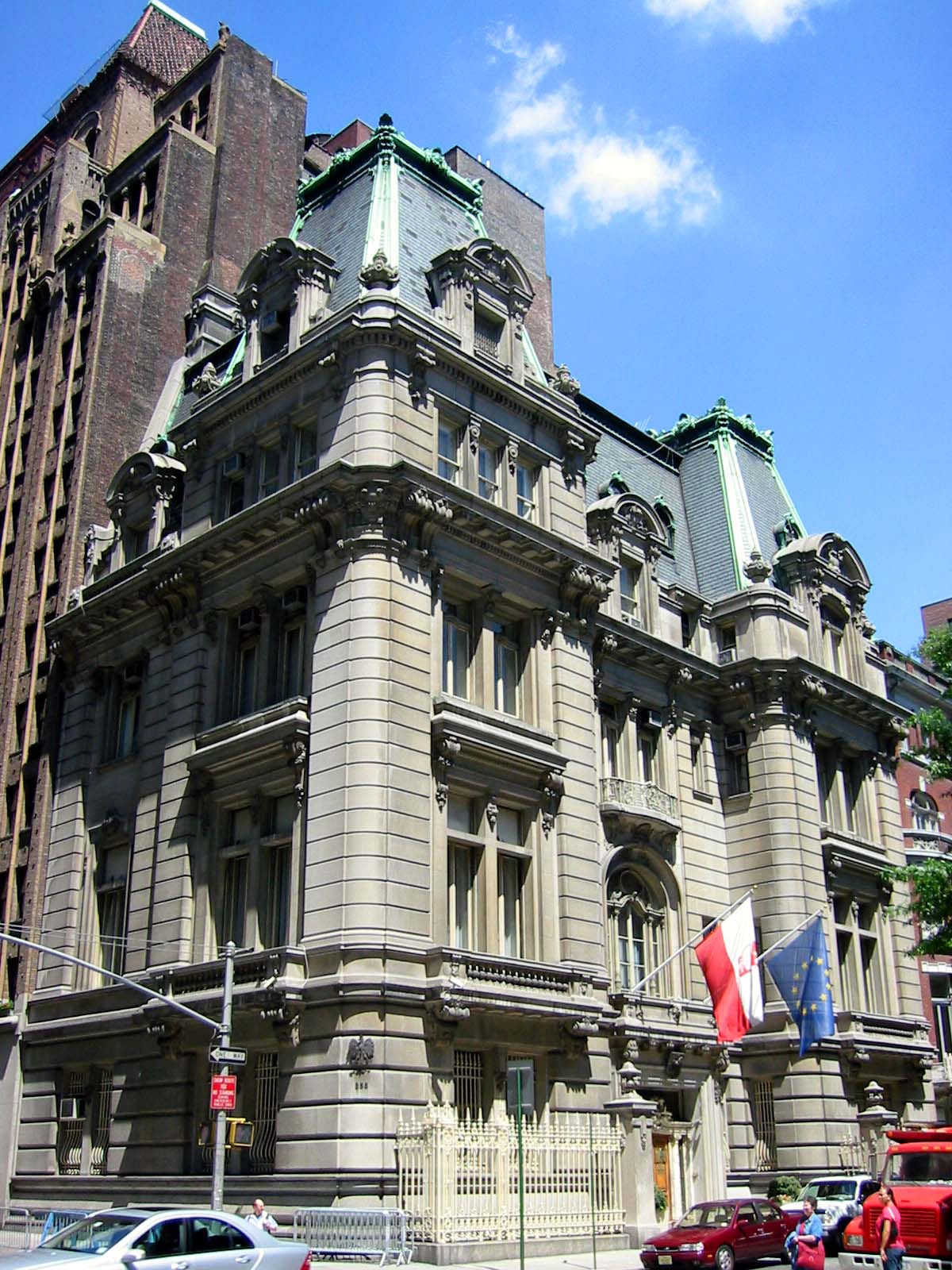
- The mansion in 2005
- Location: 233 Madison Avenue; Manhattan, New York City
- Coordinates: 40°44′58.8″N 73°58′52.4″W
- Built: 1902–1905
- Architect: C. P. H. Gilbert
- Architectural style: Beaux-Arts
- Part of: Murray Hill Historic District (ID03000997)
- NRHP reference No.: 83001722
- NYSRHP No.: 06101.000568
- NYCL No.: 0884

Significant dates
- Added to NRHP: August 25, 1983
- Designated CP: February 27, 2013
- Designated NYSRHP: July 18, 1983
- Designated NYCL: March 25, 1975

The Joseph Raphael De Lamar House (also the De Lamar Mansion) is a mansion at 233 Madison Avenue, at the northeast corner of the intersection with 37th Street, in the Murray Hill neighborhood of Manhattan in New York City, New York. Built from 1902 to 1905, the five-story house was designed by C. P. H. Gilbert in the Beaux-Arts style for Joseph Raphael De Lamar. The house has served as the Consulate General of Poland in New York City since 1973. The mansion is a New York City designated landmark and on the National Register of Historic Places, and it is a contributing property to the Murray Hill Historic District.

The De Lamar Mansion's facade includes rusticated stonework, balconies, and a mansard roof. The western elevation of the facade is on Madison Avenue, while the southern elevation faces 37th Street. Both elevations are divided horizontally into three sections: the ground story, the second and third stories, and the roof. The facade on 37th Street consists of two projecting pavilions on either side of a recessed center pavilion. A life-sized statue of Jan Karski is installed outside the main entrance. The house is constructed with a steel superstructure and was originally equipped with five elevators and lifts. There were originally communal rooms on the first two stories, including a billiards room, dining room, and library on the first story and a ballroom, gallery, and music room on the second story. The upper stories had bedrooms, and there was also a gymnasium on the fifth story.

De Lamar acquired the site in 1901 and hired Gilbert to design a family residence. De Lamar, his daughter Alice, and several servants lived there until De Lamar died in 1918. The American Bible Society attempted to buy the house in 1921, but the deal was canceled due to disputes over zoning. In 1924, the National Democratic Club purchased the house, using it as a headquarters for half a century. The club sold the house to the Republic of Poland to pay off debts. The interior was renovated in the 1990s and 2000s, though the mansion retains its original decorative features.

== Site ==
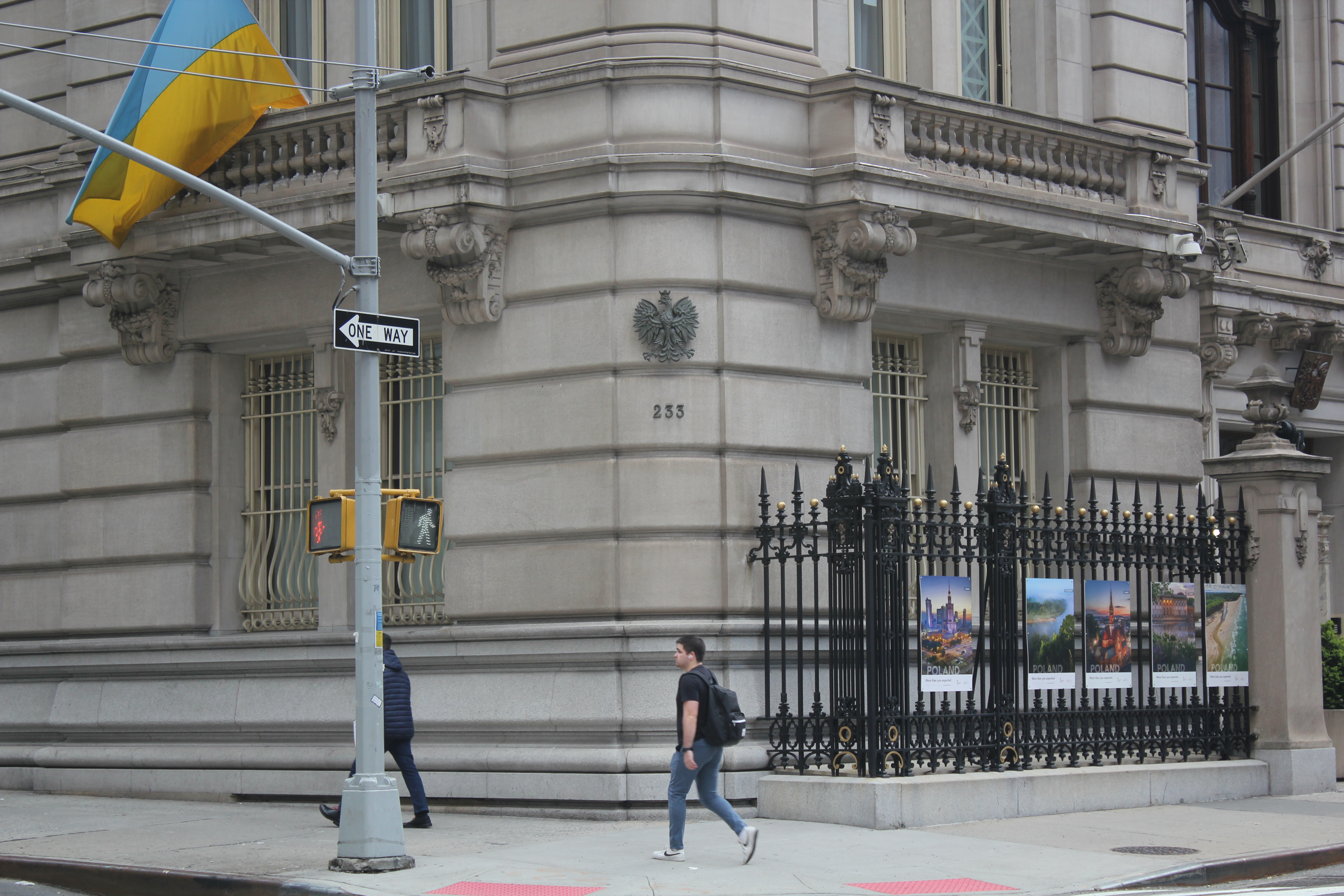
The street corner outside the building, which is known as Jan Karski Corner

The Joseph Raphael De Lamar House (also known as the Consulate General of Poland building) is at 233 Madison Avenue in the Murray Hill neighborhood of Manhattan in New York City, New York. It is at the northeast corner with 37th Street. The street corner is named in honor of the Polish officer Jan Karski, who rescued Poles during the Holocaust.

The building's land lot is rectangular and has a total area of 4,900 sq ft (460 m^{2}), with a frontage of 49 feet (15 m) on Madison Avenue to the west and 100 feet (30 m) on 37th Street to the south. The house shares the block with the Middleton S. and Emilie Neilson Burrill House at 36 East 38th Street, as well as the former Morgans Hotel. Other nearby buildings include the Morgan Library & Museum and Union League Club to the south, Tiffany and Company Building one block west, and Scandinavia House – The Nordic Center in America to the east.

== Architecture ==
The building was designed in the Beaux-Arts style for the businessman Joseph Raphael De Lamar by C. P. H. Gilbert, who also designed other mansions such as the Isaac D. Fletcher and Felix M. Warburg residences. It is one of several Gilded Age mansions in New York City that were designed in the Beaux-Arts style. Although it no longer serves as a residence, the De Lamar Mansion retains much of its original design because of renovations carried out during the late 20th century.

=== Facade ===
The western elevation of the facade is on Madison Avenue, while the southern elevation faces 37th Street and is the home's primary elevation. On 37th Street elevation, the vertical divisions of the facade are emphasized, as compared with the horizontal decorative details. The facade on 37th Street is divided vertically into three parts, with protruding pavilions to the left and right of the main entrance. In addition, both elevations are divided horizontally into three sections: the ground (first) story, the second and third stories, and the roof. The lower two sections have a facade made of rusticated stone and are largely symmetrical. The windows are grouped in pairs, except within the recessed northernmost section of the Madison Avenue elevation, and have smooth window frames.

==== Ground story ====
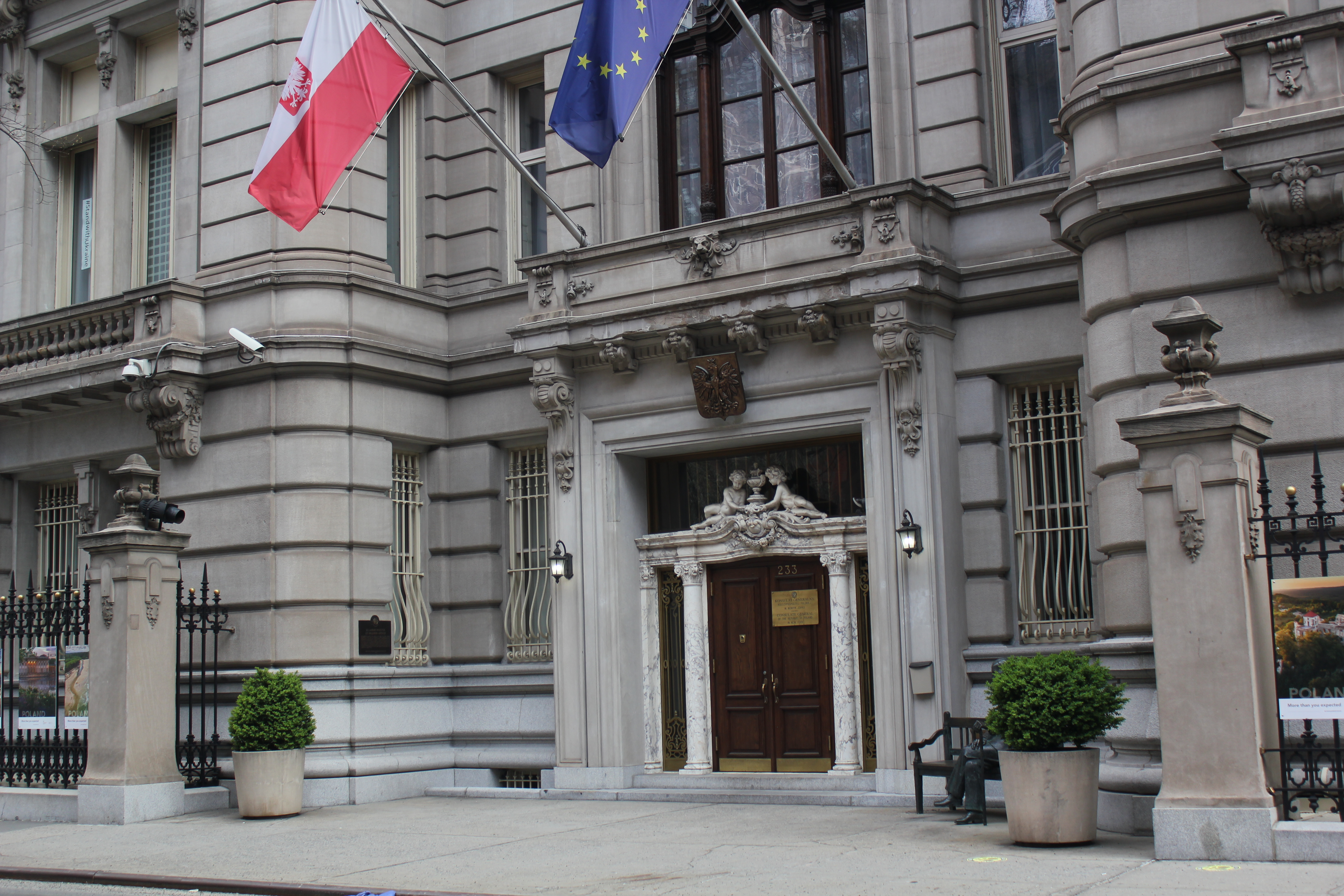
Main entrance on 37th Street

The main entrance is through a pair of oak doors in the middle of the facade's 37th Street elevation. The doors are flanked by engaged columns, in addition to sidelights with bronze grilles. The lintel above the doors has a cartouche with foliate decorations, which is topped by depictions of cherubs with urns on either side. Above the lintel, at the top of the main entrance doorway, is a transom window which illuminates the space inside. There are console brackets on the doorway to either side of the window, which supports an arched French window. There is a wide band course running horizontally above the first story.

In November 2007, the Polish Consulate to New York installed a life-sized statue of Jan Karski sitting on a bench, playing chess, outside the entrance. During the Holocaust, at the direction of the Polish government-in-exile, Karski had surreptitiously entered the Warsaw Ghetto and observed Nazi atrocities against the Jews there, and the forced transport of Jews to the Nazi Belzec extermination camp in occupied Poland. Karski then traveled to England and the United States to implore them to take action, warning that the Nazis were exterminating Jews in Poland. The statue also alludes to the fact that he died in 2000 while playing chess.

==== Upper stories ====
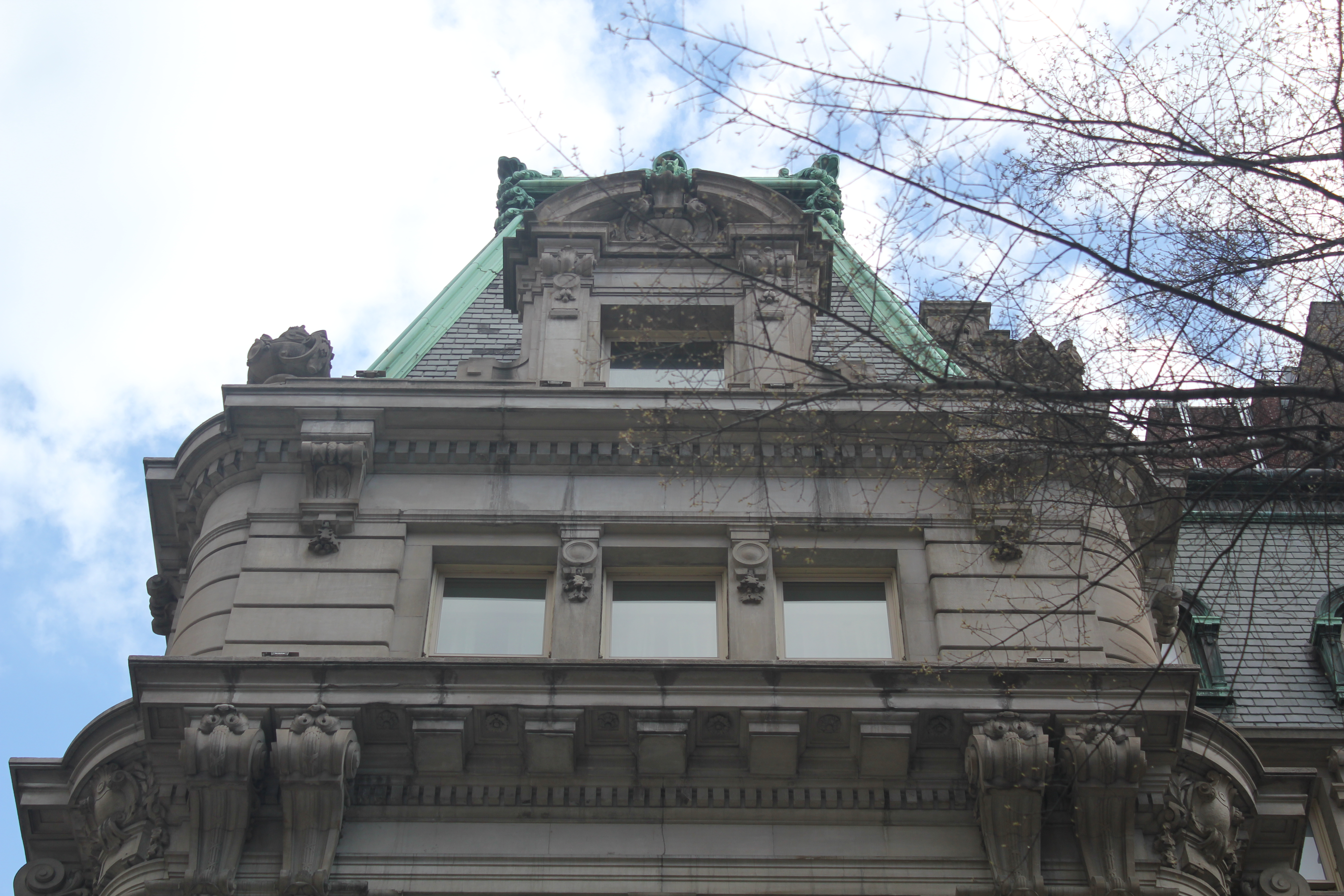
Upper stories of the western pavilion on 37th Street, seen from Madison Avenue

On the 37th Street elevation's second story, the arched French window in the center pavilion is topped by brackets and a central keystone. The outer pavilions' second-story windows have balustrades, which in turn are carried by console brackets with swag motifs. On the third story of the 37th Street elevation, the window sills of the outer pavilions have cornices underneath, while the center window has a wrought iron balcony. There are curved transom bars in the third-story windows. The cornice above the third story has console brackets on either end and is decorated with dentils and modillions.

The top two stories are asymmetrical. The western (left) pavilion on 37th Street has a rusticated fourth-story facade with a tripartite window; the mansard roof of the western pavilion begins at the fifth story. Within the center and eastern (right) pavilions on 37th Street, the lower half of the fourth story has a smooth facade, while the mansard roof begins at the upper half of the fourth story. The fourth story of the center pavilion has a partial dormer window, whose round pediment protrudes slightly from the roof; there are two smaller windows on either side. Within the eastern pavilion's fourth story, there is a dormer with a segmentally arched pediment above a pair of windows. On the fifth story, there are rounded dormer windows in the center and eastern pavilions and a square dormer in the western pavilion. The copper cresting above the roof has shell decorations.

=== Features ===
==== Structural features ====
The house is constructed with a steel superstructure. Each floor slab is made of metal arches covered with concrete, which at the time of the house's completion was known as the Roebling method of fireproofing. To prevent fires from spreading inside the house, the various rooms are divided by terracotta partitions. The basement also included white-tiled kitchens in addition to boilers. There were also call buttons on each floor. Though the entire house was equipped with a heating system when it was built, De Lamar's daughter Alice recalled that she seldom felt any heat.

When the house was constructed, it included five lifts. There was one elevator each for residents and servants; a dumbwaiter; an elevator to bring ashes from the basement to the street; and a vehicle elevator. The residents' elevator traveled only to the fifth floor, while the servants' elevator served every story and measured 3 by 5 feet (0.91 by 1.52 m). The vehicle elevator, marked only by a metal plate on sidewalk level, descended to De Lamar's garage in the basement.

==== Interior ====
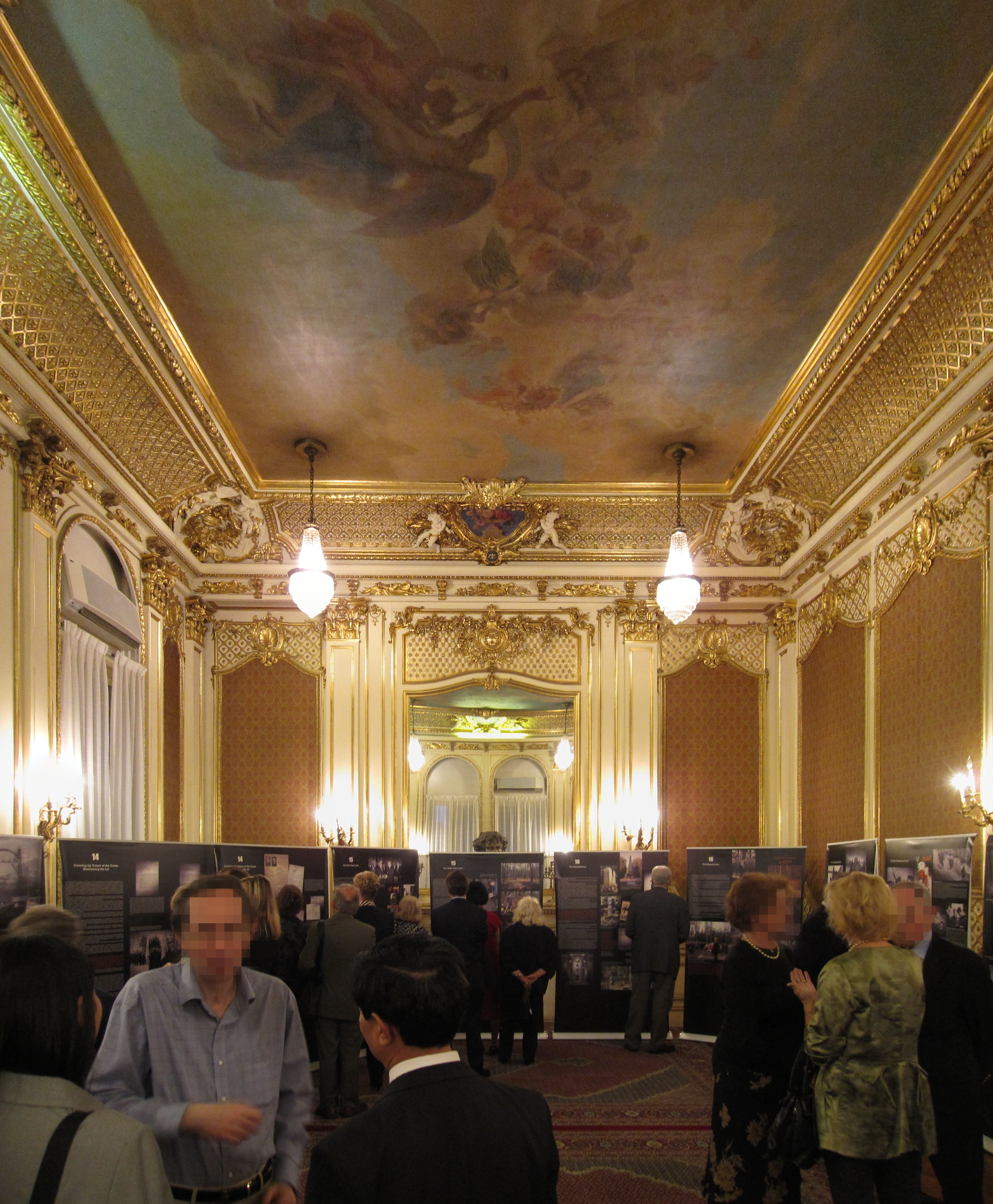
One of the rooms with ceiling paintings and gilded stucco

The house has 22 rooms, including seven with ceiling murals painted by Italian artisans. The murals depict angels, women, people dressed in 18th-century attire, and putti. A spiral staircase rises through the building; it is flanked by fluted columns at the ground floor and topped by a skylight.

At the ground (first) story, the entrance hall has a bronze grille designed in the Beaux-Arts style. On either side of a main hallway are double doors leading to the house's ground-story rooms; the doors are surrounded by moldings and topped by lintels. A billiards room and a library occupy the Madison Avenue (west) side of the house, while a dining room occupies the east side. After the mansion became a clubhouse in the 1920, the entrance hall's conservatory became a coatroom. Alice De Lamar recalled that there was originally "a fountain with plants and marble figures" at the bottom of the staircase landing.

The second floor includes an art gallery or Pompeian room to the east, a ballroom to the west, and a music room in the center. The ballroom and music room have a gilded ceiling cornice surrounding a ceiling, which is decorated with a mural by Louis Schaettle, Passing of the Season. The ballroom's walls have gilded pilasters interspersed with lighting sconces and fabric panels. Within the music room, the walls are topped by a gilded entablature, and there is a musicians' gallery suspended above part of the room, connecting the ballroom and Pompeian room. Alice recalled that there was a gilt grand piano in the music room. Within the Pompeian room, the walls are wainscoted with wooden panels, interspersed with Doric columns, and there is a marble fireplace mantel on one wall. Above the Pompeian room's columns are a painted frieze and stained glass panels, the latter of which are backlit. The ceiling is coffered, and there is a panel in the middle. Originally, the Pompeian room had red walls and a Persian carpet, and several murals by Schaettle were placed on the walls.

The upper stories were used as bedrooms. On the third story is the former breakfast room, as well as three bedrooms, all with baths. One of the third-story bedrooms was used by J. R. De Lamar, while the other two were guest rooms. The easternmost third-story room has paneling and a frieze on the walls. Its ceiling is painted and has a crystal chandelier and dentils. On the fourth floor is the former sewing room and two additional bedrooms with baths, one of which was for Alice De Lamar. The fifth floor contains the former housekeeper's bedroom and various servants' bedrooms. There is also an attic within the mansard roof, which has a laundry room and a gymnasium. The original bedrooms were redecorated with blue velour after the original art in these rooms was stolen in the late 1910s and early 1920s.

== History ==
Joseph Raphael De Lamar was a Dutch-born merchant seaman who was born around 1843. After becoming the captain of his own ship in the 1860s, he made a fortune in mining and metallurgy in Colorado and Idaho through the late 19th century. De Lamar also served in the Idaho Senate before ultimately deciding to move to New York City, where he lived at 109 Madison Avenue. He married Nellie Sands in 1893, and Sands gave birth to their only child, Alice, two years later. The De Lamar family was living in Paris at the time. De Lamar divorced Sands soon after their daughter was born. He moved back to New York City with his daughter and decided to construct a grand house in New York City.

=== Residential use ===
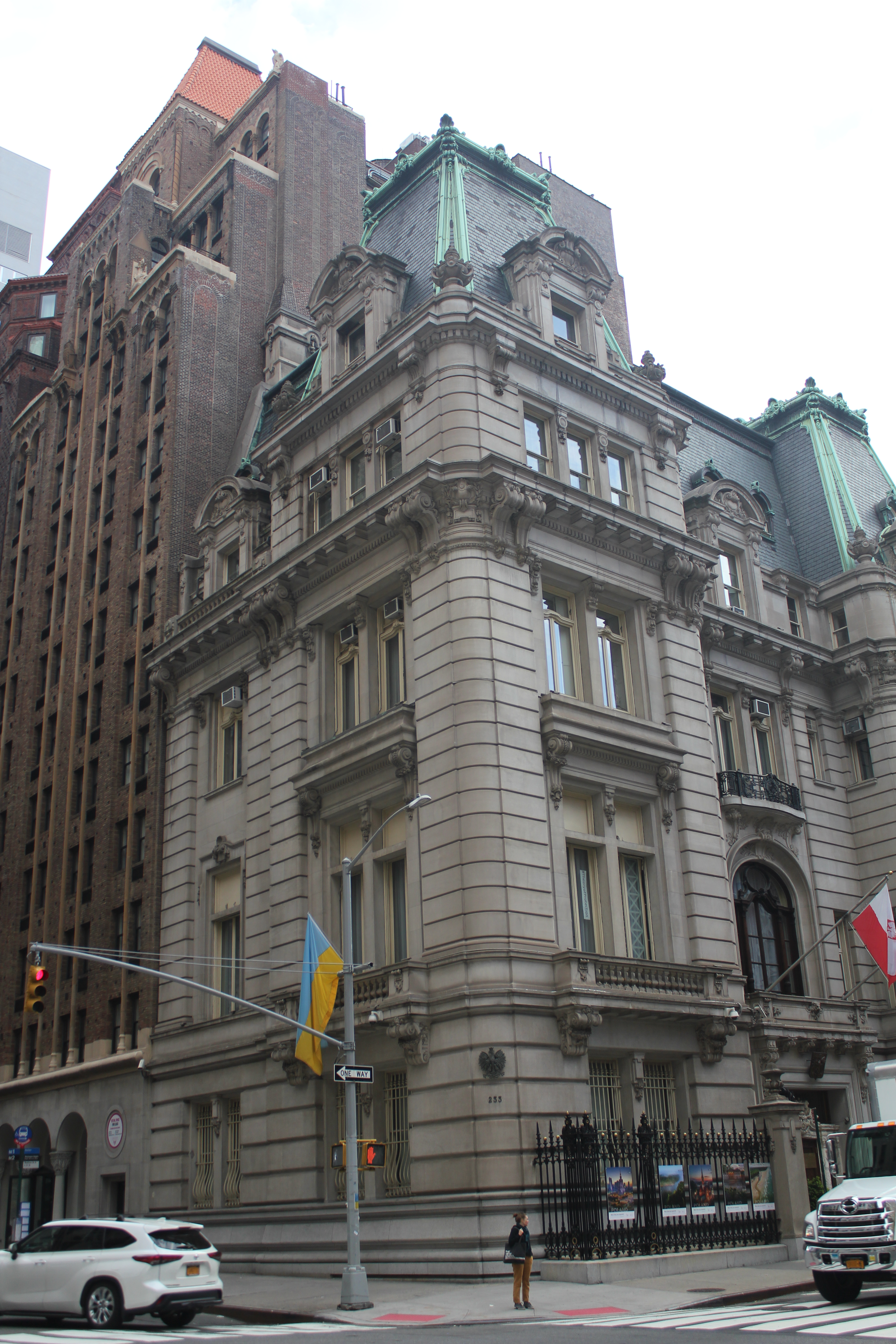
The western pavilion of the house as seen from diagonally across 37th Street and Madison Avenue

In April 1901, De Lamar bought a four-story brownstone at 233 Madison Avenue and 37th Street from Henry D. Noyes, paying $254,000 for the land. (Note: Equivalent to $8 million in 2024 (Note: Johnston, Louis; Williamson, Samuel H. (2023). "What Was the U.S. GDP Then?". MeasuringWorth. United States Gross Domestic Product deflator figures follow the MeasuringWorth series.)) He planned to develop a six-story mansion there, hiring C. P. H. Gilbert to design the house that month. De Lamar bought a four-story structure at 235 Madison Avenue (just north of 37th Street) from Marion C. Grimshaw that September. In August 1902, Gilbert submitted revised plans to the New York City Department of Buildings for a house measuring 50 by 100 feet (15 by 30 m). The structure would cost $400,000 and would contain an underground garage with a vehicle elevator. That month, Charles T. Wills was hired as the house's general contractor. According to one Hartford Courant article, De Lamar gave workers cigars wrapped in five-dollar bills so they would be motivated to complete the building more quickly. Alice later recalled that, when she was eight years old, she was told that her father's mansion would be as large as the 130-room William A. Clark House on the Upper East Side.

De Lamar was considering selling the mansion in 1904, when the house was nearly completed; The New York Times wrote that he no longer had a strong desire to live in one of Murray Hill's largest mansions. The Times estimated the house would be worth $600,000 to $700,000 upon its completion. (Note: Equivalent to $16–19 million in 2024) By 1905, De Lamar was planning to move into the house with his fiancée, the opera singer Lillian Nordica. The construction cost was estimated at $1 million or $1.5 million. (Note: Equivalent to $27–40 million in 2024) At the time of the house's completion, the neighboring residences were occupied by figures such as J. P. Morgan Sr. and J. P. Morgan Jr. According to the 1910 United States census, J. R. De Lamar lived in the house with Alice and nine servants. Among the events that took place at the mansion was a 1915 debutante party for Alice De Lamar. The house was valued at $400,000 by the mid-1910s. (Note: Equivalent to $8 million in 2024)

De Lamar died in 1918 at the age of 75. He left an estate worth $32 million, (Note: Equivalent to $378 million in 2024) including a life trust to his daughter, a mechanic who was generally uninterested in high society. De Lamar bequeathed the house itself to three medical schools: those of Harvard, Columbia, and Johns Hopkins universities. The executors of De Lamar's estate auctioned off the mansion's decorations in November 1919, receiving more than $250,000. (Note: Equivalent to $3 million in 2024) The objects on sale included Beauvais tapestries, silk rugs, and a copy of Hiram Powers's sculpture The Greek Slave. Alice eventually moved to 740 Park Avenue. The house remained empty for several years, during which thieves absconded with some of the original art. In 1920, the city government valued the objects inside the house at $145,222, (Note: Equivalent to $2,883,000 in 2024) while his estate's executors gave a different valuation of $110,113.

=== Institutional use ===
==== Attempted sale to American Bible Society ====
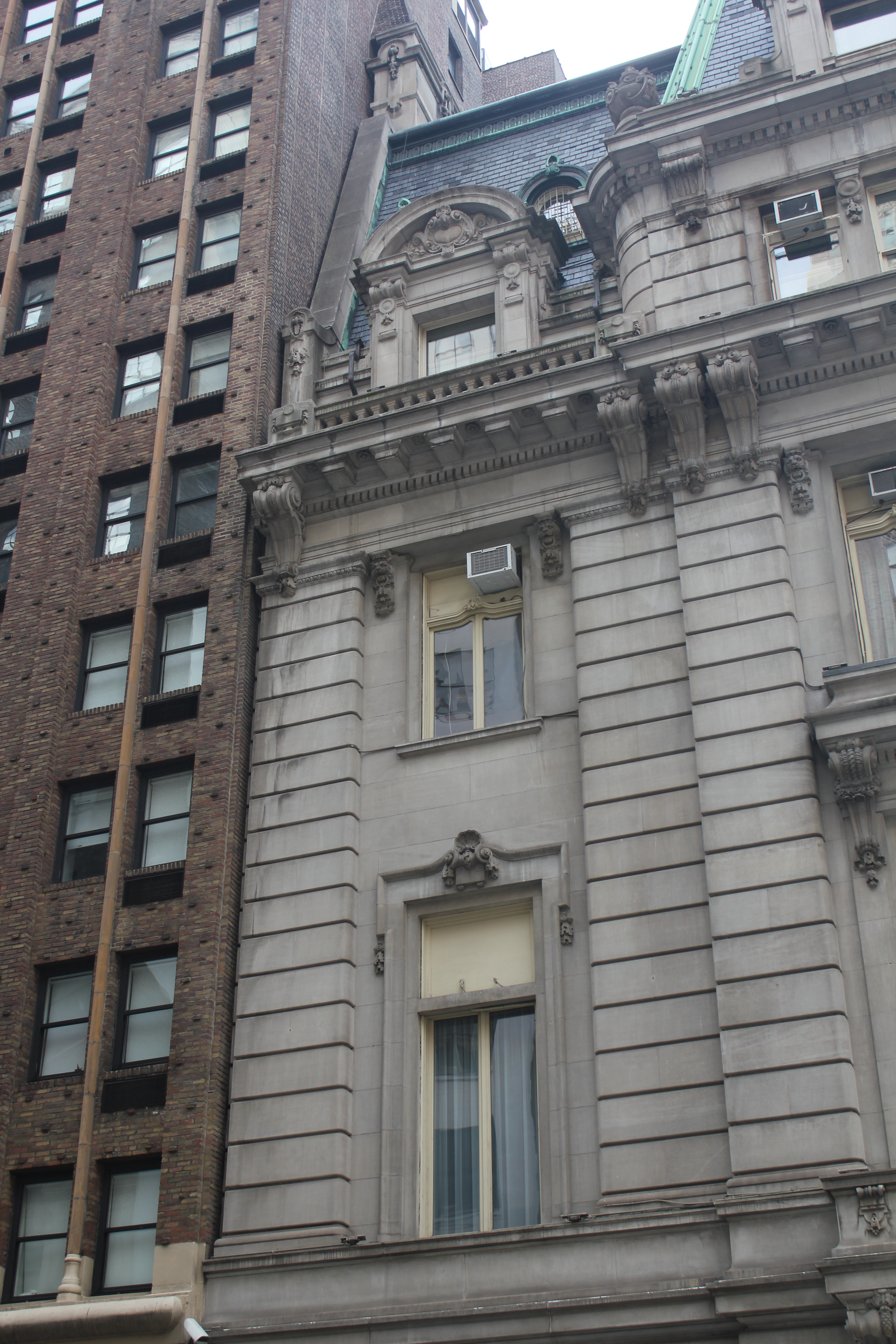
Recessed windows on Madison Avenue

By mid-1921, the house was on sale; at the time, the property was valued at $340,000. The proceeds of the sale would be donated to three colleges that were mentioned in De Lamar's will. The American Bible Society signed a contract in May 1921 to buy the house for $275,000, and it made a down payment of $5,000. The society planned to use the building as a Bible store. Although the New-York Tribune reported in June 1921 that another colonel named Floyd Brown was negotiating for the house, The New York Times wrote that no one was actively negotiating for the site. The executors of De Lamar's estate refused to sell the house to the American Bible Society, claiming that the building would need significant renovations to accommodate the group. In addition, the executors claimed that the American Bible Society's use of the building would violate the Murray Hill Restrictive Agreement, an 1847 covenant restricting the development of non-residential buildings on Madison Avenue, as well as the 1916 Zoning Resolution.

The structure was sold in September 1921 to Ella M. O'Kane. The agreement between the De Lamar estate and the American Bible Society had never been rescinded, and the society requested that the executors of De Lamar's estate return their down payment. When the payment was not returned, the American Bible Society sued the estate's executors in the New York Supreme Court in May 1922. A Supreme Court judge ruled in July that the payment had to be refunded but that the 1847 covenant precluded the house from being sold to the American Bible Society. The covenant itself was repealed less than a year later. By then, many of Murray Hill's private residences were being sold off and converted to other uses, although the De Lamar Mansion and the two residences to the north remained in place.

==== National Democratic Club ====
The National Democratic Club, an affiliate of the U.S. Democratic Party, purchased the building for use as its headquarters in January 1923, paying $287,000 for the structure. (Note: Equivalent to $4 million in 2024) The club sold its previous headquarters at 617 Fifth Avenue to pay for the purchase, earning more than $1 million from its old clubhouse, which was demolished to make way for the Saks Fifth Avenue flagship store. Club leaders added a presidential suite and a governor's room, though the house's murals were preserved. The club opened within the De Lamar House in December 1923. Shortly after the Democratic Club moved into the mansion, it began publishing the National Democratic Magazine from the building. The club replaced some of the original decorations and artwork, obtaining other pieces back. The city government also began widening the adjacent stretch of Madison Avenue in mid-1924, which required the removal of an iron railing in front of the house on Madison Avenue.

The Democratic Club had paid off all the mortgages on its Madison Avenue and Fifth Avenue properties by 1926. The club requested in 1930 that the New York City Board of Estimate rezone the land as a commercial site rather than a residential site, claiming that the city government had neglected to rezone the mansion when it rezoned neighboring parcels for commercial use. The board denied this request after opposition from J. P. Morgan Jr., who claimed it would violate the Murray Hill Restrictive Agreement. Another petition to rezone the area was denied the next year. The Democratic Club also added multiple portraits to the De Lamar Mansion, including those of Tammany Hall leader George W. Olvany in 1937 and former club president Thomas J. McMahon in 1938. Members of the club donated additional paintings, including Charles Henry Miller's 1876 painting of the High Bridge and Ralph Albert Blakelock's 1883 painting of the intersection of Seventh Avenue and 55th Street. There was a bar at ground level and an informal library.

After Tammany Hall political leaders sold their old headquarters at 44 Union Square in 1943, they briefly considered relocating to the mansion temporarily, but this became unnecessary when the organization leased space elsewhere. The Democratic Club remained in the building in the 1950s. This made the club one of several Democratic Party affiliates along Madison Avenue at the time, along with Tammany Hall and the New York Democratic State Committee. Its visitors during the mid-20th century included Democratic U.S. presidents Harry S. Truman, John F. Kennedy, and Lyndon B. Johnson. By the 1960s, Tammany Hall members sometimes met at the house as well. The National Democratic Club's membership, which had numbered 1,000 in the 1960s, had declined by two-thirds within six years, forcing the club into debt. The club's political influence had declined; furthermore, many prospective members were deterred by high membership dues and were afraid of going out at night.

=== Polish consulate ===
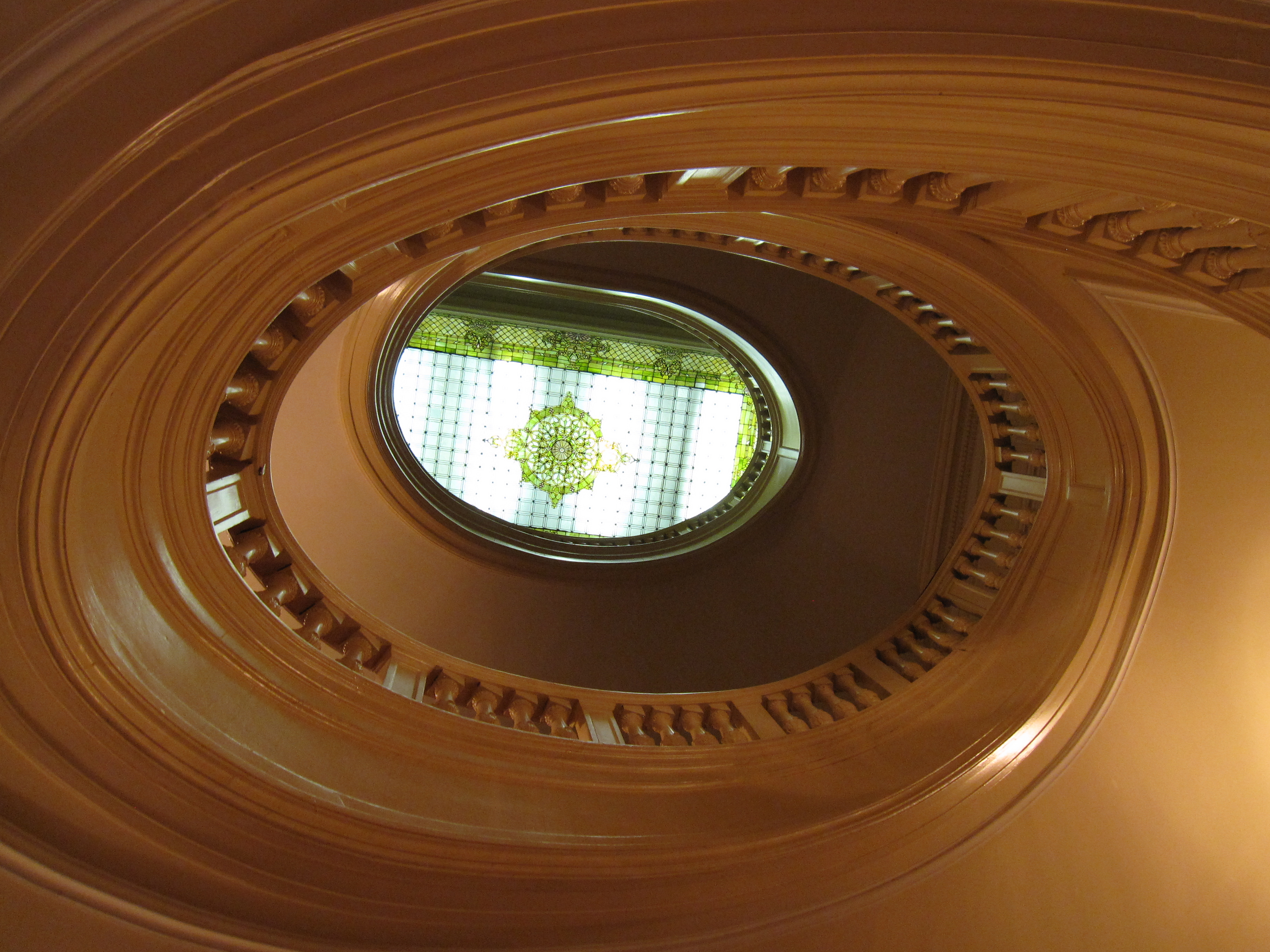
Staircase with leaded glass skylight

In September 1972, MBM Development offered to buy the house for $1.2 million; (Note: Equivalent to $7 million in 2024) the house would have been used as the headquarters for the Jockey Club of New York. (Note: Equivalent to $7 million in 2024) To pay off debts, the Democratic Club's board of governors recommended selling the mansion to the government of Poland that October; the club's members voted to sell the building to Poland the next month. The Jockey Club withdrew its bid for the mansion, allowing Poland's government to buy it, and the Polish government paid $940,000, with plans to convert the house into its Consulate General in New York. (Note: Equivalent to $5 million in 2024) The club relocated to 23 Park Avenue after closing its clubhouse at the De Lamar Mansion on January 9, 1973; over the next two days, the club sold off the furnishings to raise additional money. At that point, almost none of the original furnishings remained, except for a Steinway piano.

The Consulate General of Poland in New York City opened within the building in 1973 and initially had a 75-seat screening room. The building was targeted in a bomb blast in 1976, though it sustained minimal damage. It was also used as a meeting point for demonstrations. In addition, the Polish government began using the building as a polling station in 1989 for the country's parliamentary and presidential elections, Poland's first free election in several decades. The Polish consular office hired Artenova of New York, a local Polish-American restoration firm, to restore the exterior for $200,000 during the early 1990s. (Note: Equivalent to $0.4 million in 2024) The project included fixes to the facade, roof, columns, and copper cresting; the project was completed by 1992. The De Lamar Mansion was one of a few Gilded Age–era buildings remaining in Murray Hill by the beginning of the 21st century. The Polish consulate began hosting recitals and other events at the house in 2006 as part of the De Lamar Mansion Salon of Arts & Ideas program.

The Polish government installed a statue of Jan Karski outside the building in 2007, following three years of efforts from Polish American Congress member Chet Szarejko and Polish Consul General Krzysztof Kasprzyk. The street corner outside the building was renamed for Karski two years later. In addition, the house was again renovated in the late 2000s at a cost of $1.2 million. The project included replacing the windows, roof and masonry work. The house was an official city landmark, so the New York City Landmarks Preservation Commission had to approve the renovation, and some parts of the house were cleaned with toothbrushes. After the renovation was finished in 2010, the Consulate of Poland opened the second floor to the public for events such as concerts and lectures.

== Reception and landmark designations ==
When the structure was being constructed, one newspaper described the building as "one of the handsomest palaces on Murray Hill". When the Democratic Club moved into the building, the New-York Tribune described it as "massive and pretentious". A New York Times writer, describing the mansion in 1958 as having "a kind of forgotten peace", wrote that "even today, the chambers glow with warm murals, sparkle with crystal chandeliers".

After the De Lamar Mansion was converted to a Polish consulate, Richard Peck wrote for The New York Times that the mansion "remains one of the city's chief Beaux Arts relics". In their 1985 book Elegant New York, John Tauranac and Christopher Little wrote that the house was "uncontestably one of the grandest expressions of Beaux-Arts in the city, a great French-style palais from its concrete base to the copper cresting atop its mansard roof". The architectural historian Christopher Gray wrote in 2003 that, although the De Lamar Mansion did not have "lacy" French Gothic decorations like Gilbert's earlier mansions did, "its bloated size gives it the opulent quality of the earlier buildings". In 2017, a writer for Joseph Conrad Today stated that the De Lamar Mansion "is undoubtedly one of the outstanding examples of New York Beaux-Arts residential architecture."

The New York City Landmarks Preservation Commission designated the De Lamar Mansion as a New York City landmark on March 25, 1975. The De Lamar Mansion was added to the New York State Register of Historic Places on July 18, 1983, and to the National Register of Historic Places (NRHP) on August 25, 1983. Since 2013, it has been located within the expanded Murray Hill Historic District, which is also listed on the NRHP.

== See also ==
- National Register of Historic Places listings in Manhattan from 14th to 59th Streets
- List of New York City Designated Landmarks in Manhattan from 14th to 59th Streets
