= Daphne Phelps =

British writer (1911–2005)

Daphne Phelps (23 June 1911 – 30 November 2005) was a British writer who spent most of her life in Taormina, Sicily.

== Life ==
Phelps attended St Felix School, Southwold, Suffolk, and trained in psychiatric social work at St Anne's College, Oxford, and at the London School of Economics.

Just after the end of World War II, she inherited Casa Cuseni, an elegant villa with elaborate gardens, designed and built in 1905 by her uncle, the artist Robert Hawthorn Kitson. She intended to sell it and return to her life in England, but instead she ended up moving to Sicily and running the house by taking paying guests. There she entertained numerous writer and artist friends including Bertrand Russell, Henry Faulkner, Roald Dahl and Tennessee Williams.

Towards the end of her life she wrote a memoir of the experience, A House in Sicily (1999), published by Virago. Following her death, Casa Cuseni is run as a historic house museum, with a few rooms available by the night.

== See also ==
- History of Taormina

== Bibliography ==
- Daphne Phelps (1999) A House in Sicily, London, Virago. ISBN 978-1860496486.
