= Statue of Jan Karski (New York City) =

Sculpture in Manhattan, New York, U.S.

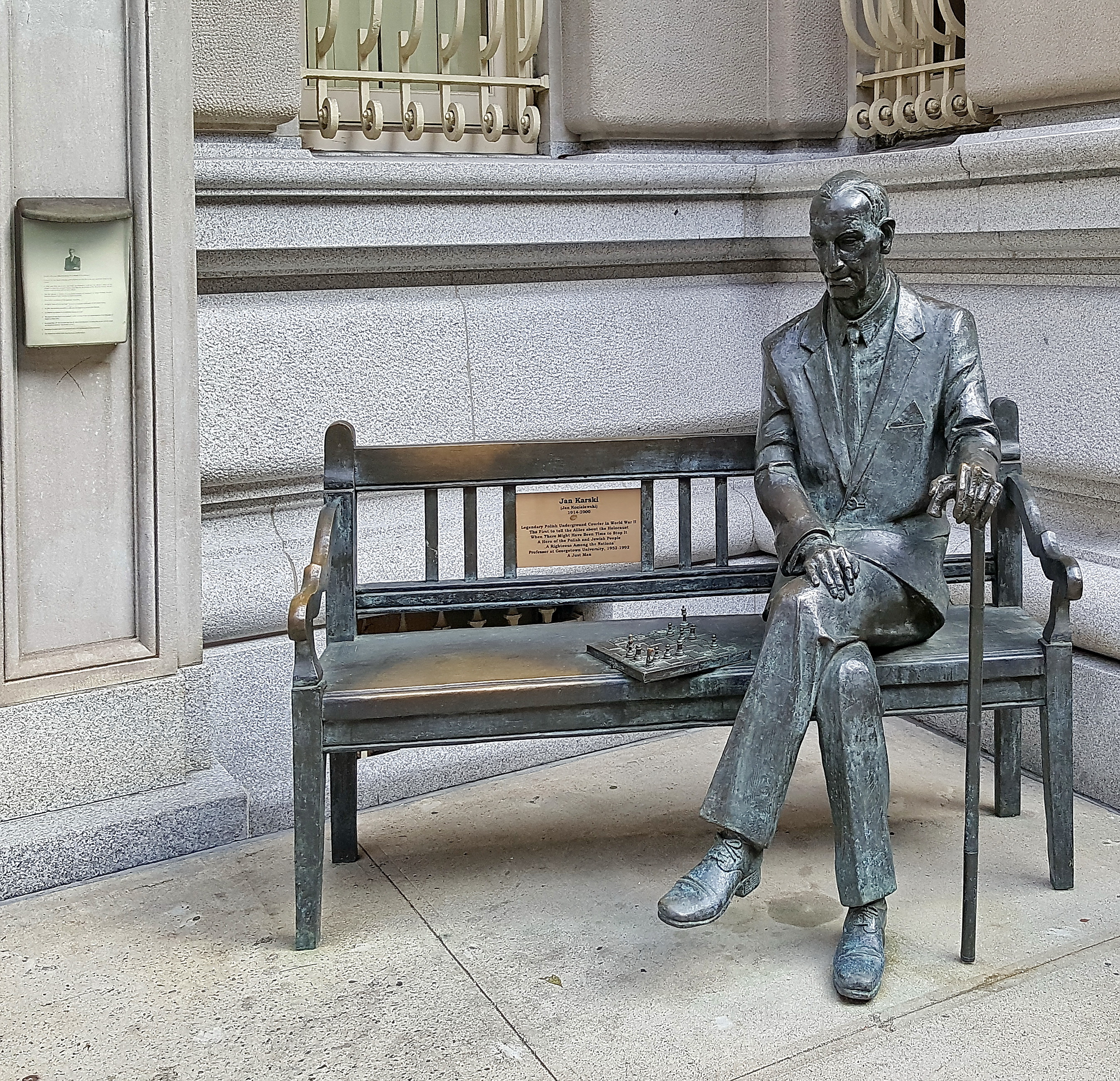
- The sculpture in 2017.
- Interactive map of Statue of Jan Karski
- Location: 233 Madison Avenue; Manhattan, New York City, United States
- Coordinates: 40.749630°N 73.981226°W
- Designer: Karol Badyna
- Type: Statue, bench monument
- Material: Bronze
- Opening date: November 22, 2007
- Dedicated to: Jan Karski

The statue of Jan Karski, also known as the Jan Karski Bench (Polish pronunciation: [ˈjan ˈkar.ski]; Polish: Ławeczka Jana Karskiego), is a bronze statue in Manhattan, New York City, United States, in the neighborhood of Murray Hill. It is located at the intersection of 37th Street and Madison Avenue, known as the Jan Karski Corner, in front of the Consulate General of Poland in the Joseph Raphael De Lamar House. The statue is dedicated to Jan Karski (1914–2000), a 20th-century soldier, diplomat, and political scientist, who as a member of the Polish resistance, reported to the Western Allies about state of occupied Poland, Germany's destruction of the Warsaw Ghetto and its operation of extermination camps on Polish soil. He is depicted sitting on a bench, playing chess. It was designed by Karol Badyna, and unveiled on November 22, 2007.

== History ==
The monument was dedicated to Jan Karski (1914–2000), a 20th-century soldier, diplomat, and political scientist, who as a member of the Polish resistance, reported about the state of reported to the Western Allies about state of occupied Poland, Germany's destruction of the Warsaw Ghetto and its operation of extermination camps on Polish soil. The sculpture was designed by Karol Badyna, and unveiled on November 22, 2007. It was placed in front of the Consulate General of Poland in the Joseph Raphael De Lamar House, at the corner of 37th Street and Madison Avenue. The ceremony was attended by many distinguished guests, including the representatives of the President of Poland and the Polish Ministry of Foreign Affairs, as well as by the Chief Rabbi of Tel Aviv, Yisrael Meir Lau. Former president of the United States, and student of Jan Karski at Georgetown University, Bill Clinton sent his personal letter to be read at the ceremony. The location was later renamed to the Jan Karski Corner in 2009.

It was Badyna's third monument dedicated to Karski, with previous works unveiled in Washington, D.C. (2002), and Kielce (2005), and later also followed by Łódź (2009), Tel Aviv (2009), Warsaw (2013), Estoril (2016), and Kraków (2016). The statues were later criticized by Karski's family, stating that he was against being commemorated with monuments, as well as by them having form of benches.

== Design ==
The bronze statue depicts Jan Karski seated on one side of a bench with his legs crossed and his left hand resting on a cane, and a chessboard with pieces set beside him. There is room on the opposite side of the bench for visitors to sit as if to participate in a chess match. A commemorative plaque is imbedded in the backrest, with the following inscription:

Jan Karski

(Jan Kozielewski)
1914–2000
Legendary Polish Underground Courier in World War II
The First to tell the Allies about the Holocaust When There Might Have Been Time to Stop It
A Hero of the Polish and Jewish People
"A Righteous Among the Nations"

Professor at Georgetown University, 1952–1992
A Just Man
