= Alice DeLamar =

American patron of the arts (1895–1983)

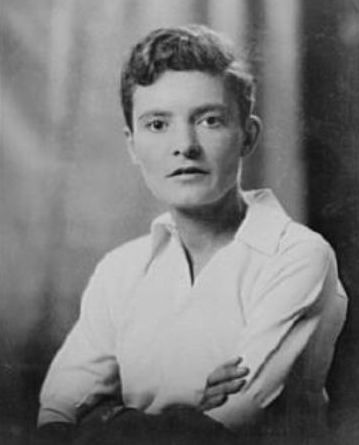
Alice DeLamar, 1927

Alice DeLamar (April 23, 1895 – August 31, 1983) was an American heiress and patron of the arts who was the only child of Joseph Raphael De Lamar. She helped fund plays by Mercedes de Acosta. DeLamar also donated some of her land in Palm Beach, Florida to the Audubon Society in the 1960s.

== Early life ==
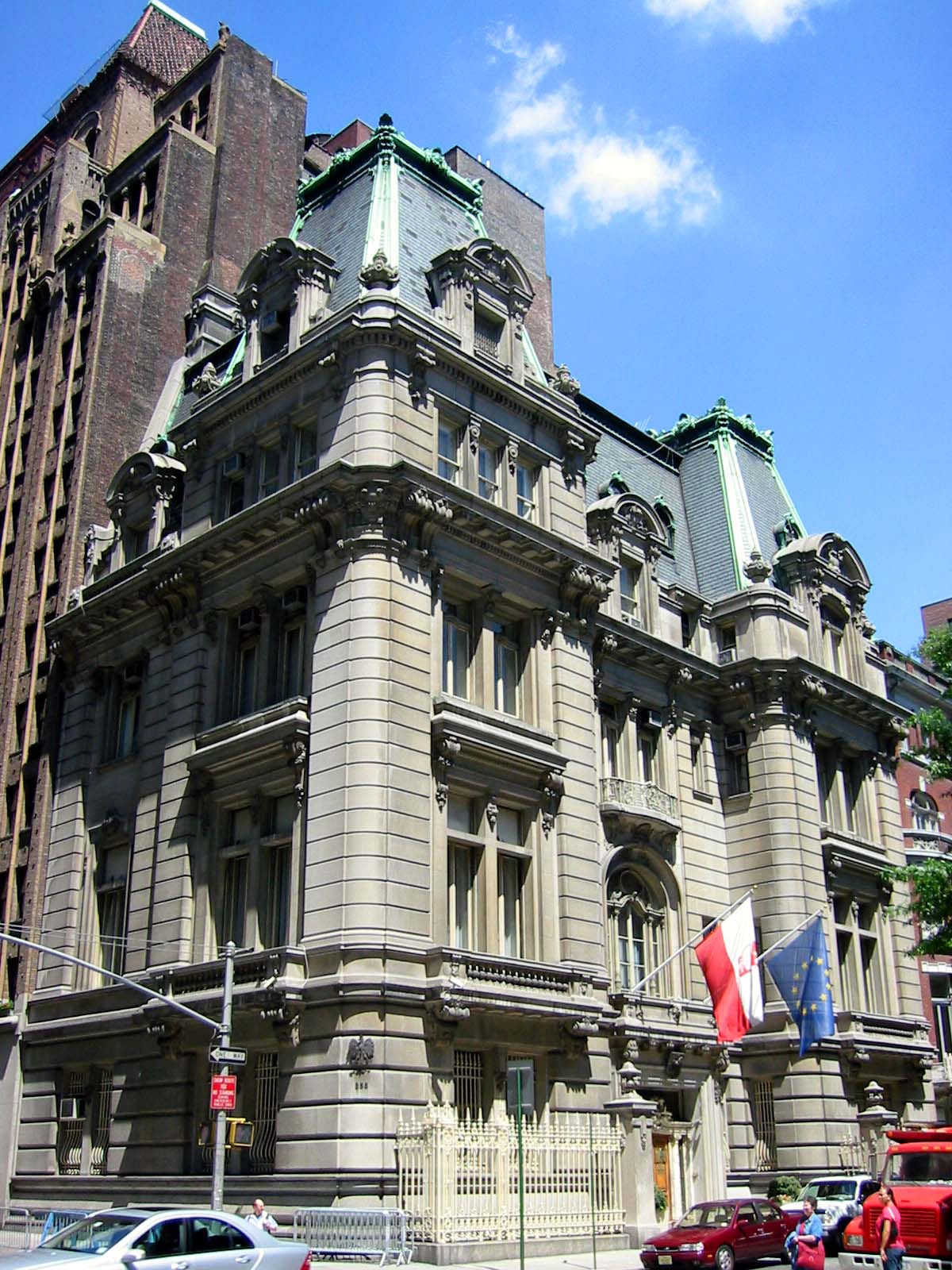
Joseph Raphael De Lamar House at Madison Avenue and 37th Street in Manhattan, now the Polish Consulate

DeLamar was born April 23, 1895, in New York City to Joseph Raphael De Lamar and Nellie Sands. She was their only child. The DeLamars had a mansion in New York City and an estate on Glen Cove on Long Island called Pennbrook or Pembroke. After she was born the family moved to Paris, where she lived until she and her father moved back to Murray Hill, Manhattan in 1900. Late in the 1900s, DeLamar was put into the Spence School by her godfather, William Nelson Cromwell. Her parents divorced in 1910, and her father gained custody of her. She had a half-sister, Consuelo Hatmaker, from her mother and her second husband, James Hatmaker.

After she graduated from the Spence School, DeLamar and Evangeline Johnson, one of her schoolmates, volunteered for the Red Cross Motor Corps in Europe during World War I. Joseph Raphael De Lamar, Alice DeLamar's father, died December 1, 1918, making her the inheritor of $10 million (equivalent to $214,048,673 in 2025) and was subsequently called the richest bachelor girl in the United States. Preferring a simpler life, she eschewed the family mansion for a Park Avenue apartment following her father's death.

== Career ==
=== Philanthropy ===
DeLamar was a patron of the arts and supported the careers of architects, artists, choreographers and writers, but she often preferred to remain anonymous when making financial donations. She commissioned Ida Tarbell to write a book about architect Addison Mizner, that was illustrated by photographs of Frank Geisler, when Mizner was experiencing financial difficulties. She oversaw the work, including selecting images for the book.

She supported environmental and social organizations. In 1969, she donated the land to the Aspetuck Land Trust for the 21-acre Stonebridge Waterfowl Preserve in Weston, Connecticut.

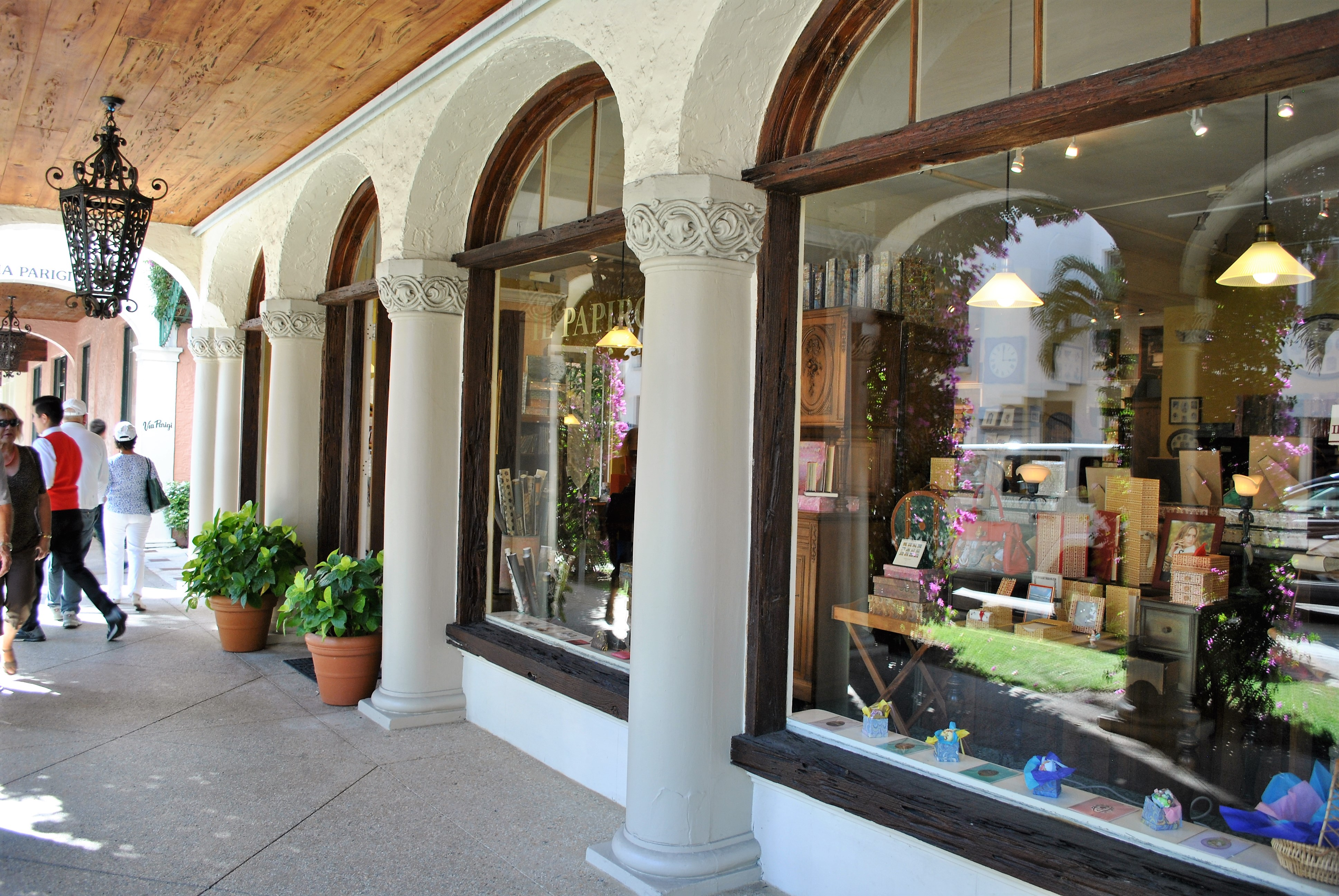
Worth Avenue Gallery, located at 347 Worth Avenue, Palm Beach, Florida, was the site of an art gallery owned by DeLamar.

=== Business ===
Beginning in 1936, she operated a restaurant in Weston, the Cobbs Mill Inn, where members of the arts dined. She purchased and renovated properties along Newtown Turnpike near her home in Connecticut that she then leased out to artists that she encouraged. In Palm Beach, Florida, she opened the Worth Avenue Gallery in 1942. It was an art gallery that promoted the works of up-and-coming artists.

== Personal life ==
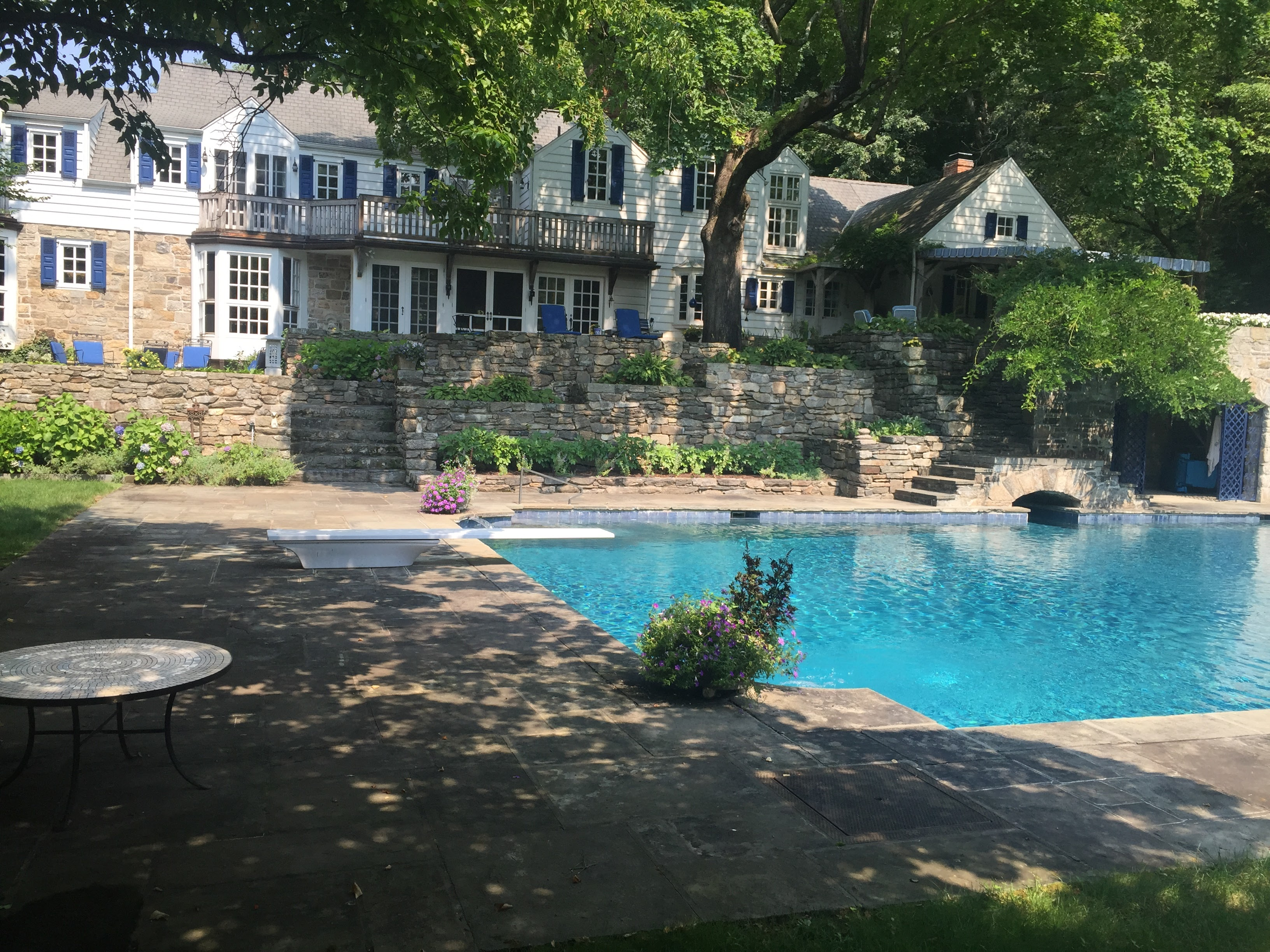
The rear of Alice DeLamar's Connecticut estate, Stonebrook

DeLamar lived at the estate named Stonebrook, located in Weston, Connecticut that she had built in the 1930s. Her visitors included Dave Brubeck, Laura Ingalls Wilder, Salvador Dalí, Eva Le Gallienne, and George Balanchine. On this estate, she had a pool built that includes a tunnel leading from the basement. It is rumored that this was so she could swim in the nude without fear of being seen or the need to walk outside.

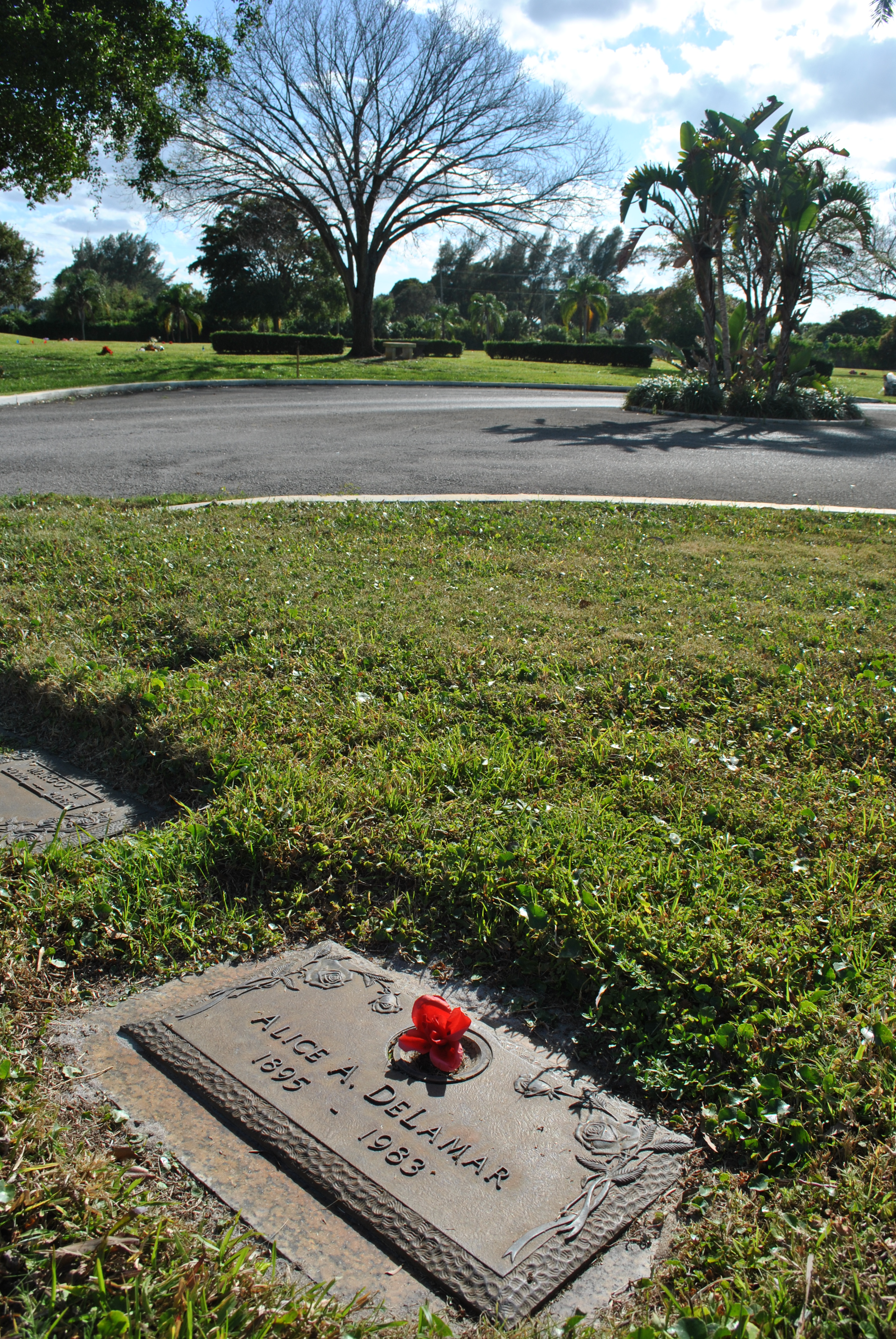
Royal Palm Memorial Gardens, West Palm Beach, Florida

She also had a house in Palm Beach, Florida along the ocean; a townhouse in Paris that was previously owned by Gerald Murphy; and an apartment at 530 Park Avenue in New York.

For six decades, DeLamar was Eva Le Gallienne's lover and financial supporter. She backed plays and she is believed to have provided funding for the Civic Repertory Theatre established by Le Gallienne in New York City.

While seeking treatment for liver cancer, DeLamar hit her head when she fell in the South Norwalk hospital, which led to her death. Her remains were cremated and buried in West Palm Beach. A large portion of her estate went to Harvard, Columbia, and Johns Hopkins Universities, in accordance with her father's will. Le Gallienne received $1 million or a quarter of her estate, including the land and house that DeLamar purchased for her.
