= Joseph Raphael De Lamar =

American politician (1843–1918)

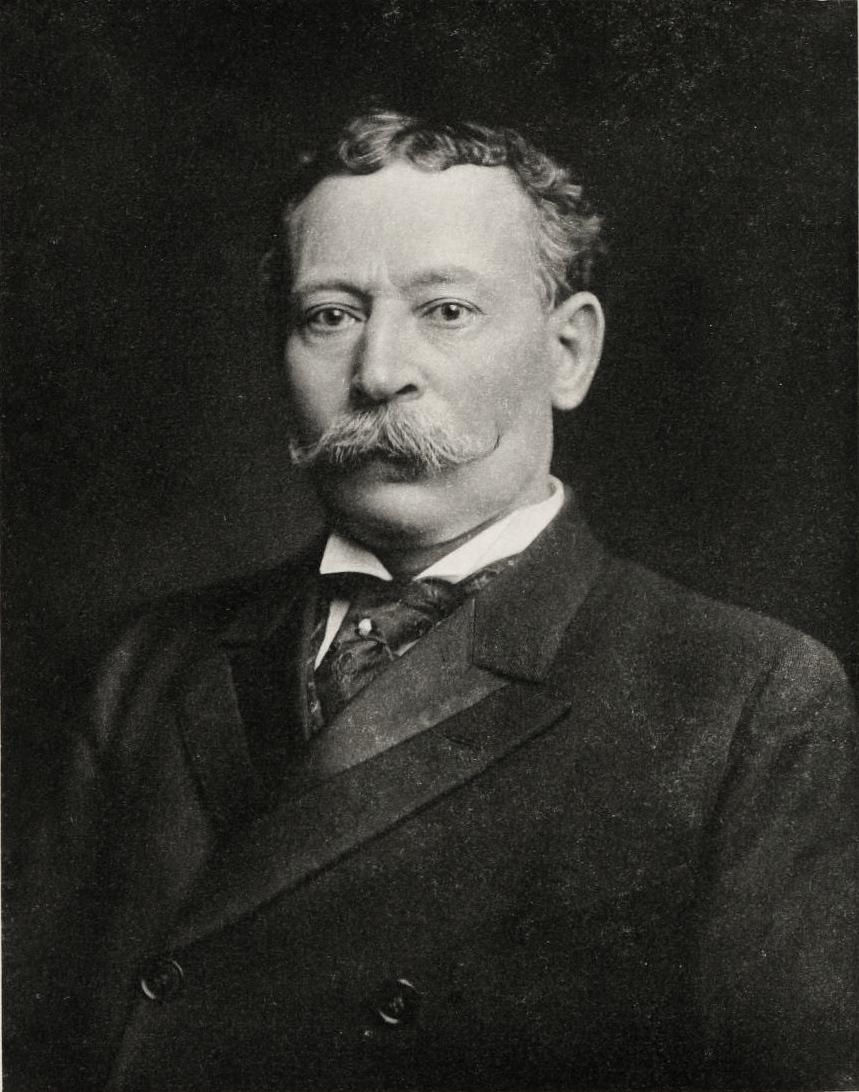
J. R. De Lamar

Joseph Raphael De Lamar (September 2, 1843 – December 1, 1918) was an American politician and businessman who owned and operated mines in the western United States and Canada. After working as a ship's captain, a contractor and a trader in the maritime industry, he entered the mining business in the late 1870s. He was a member of the Idaho Senate in 1891. He was also a financier and speculator.

== Early life ==
De Lamar was born in Amsterdam to Maximiliaan de la Mar (1814–1847) and Johanna Teune (1816–1867). His father, a banker in Amsterdam, died when Joseph had just turned four years old. In search of adventure, De Lamar stowed away aboard a Dutch vessel heading to the West Indies. When he was discovered, he was put to work without pay as assistant to the cook.

De Lamar worked as a seaman until he was twenty, when he became master of a ship, and three years later received a captain's command. He visited many of the world's ports and acquired an education through his observations in foreign countries. He was attracted to underwater work, including salvage which was profitable owing to the American Civil War, so he abandoned the merchant service and became a contractor. He was headquartered at Vineyard Haven, Massachusetts, operating along the entire east coast to the West Indies.

== Maritime prosperity ==
De Lamar received several contracts for raising sunken ships, and was very successful. In 1872 he raised the Charlotte, a transatlantic steamship that had foundered off the Bermudas loaded with Italian marble, and which had baffled the attempts of three previous wrecking companies. He nearly died at Martha's Vineyard, going down in a diving suit to examine personally the damage to the Steamer William Tibbitts, in which he was imprisoned for thirty-six hours. This led De Lamar to give up submarine work.

He then studied the opportunities of trade with Africa. Trading companies had confined their operations to the Coast, with natives from the interior bringing their goods to the Coast on the shoulders of bearers at considerable expense. De Lamar decided to do his trading in the interior. He equipped a small vessel capable of navigating the African rivers, stocked with goods and armed with four small cannon, a dozen blunderbusses, rifles and ammunition. He pushed into the interior, exercising constant vigilance to prevent attacks from hostile tribes. His venture was rewarded with complete success. He traded principally on the Gambia and Great Geba Rivers in Guinea-Bissau in West Africa. After three successful years he gave up this trade because of the climate. Many of his crew died every year of African fever. He sold his outfit to an English company.

== Mining business ==
In 1878 De Lamar came to New York, and when mining fever struck Leadville, Colorado, he went west and bought several claims. That same year he took a private course in chemistry and metallurgy from a professor from the Chicago University. In November 1879 he purchased the Terrible Lead Mine in Custer County, Colorado for $5500. It was bought from the discoverers of the deposit, John Bunyan Rains and John Spaulding. He operated it until 1885, at which time he sold to the Omaha & Grant Smelting and Refining Company for $130,0000, a handsome profit. He then obtained control of a mountain six miles west of Silver City, Idaho. Many large veins of gold and silver were discovered on the property, and he sold a half interest, after he had taken $1,500,000 from the mine, to the De Lamar Mining Company of England for $2,000,000.

From Idaho, he turned his attention to the booming Cripple Creek district of Colorado. In 1893, De Lamar, together with Edward Holden, Charles M. MacNeill and George W. Peirce of the Golden Fleece Mine, had organized a company for starting the first barrel-chlorination plant in Colorado, and were about to rehabilitate an old stamp-mill a short distance below Victor, known as the Lawrence plant. The conventional stamp mill in which the ore was crushed and the gold amalgamated with mercury was almost useless in refining Cripple Creek ore. At first, the process didn't work well, but it was improved by John Rothwell, a consultant who was the foremost expert on chlorination at the time. A young Daniel C. Jackling was hired as assayer through Charles MacNeill, the start of his noted career. In December 1895, the chlorination mill at Lawrence burned to the ground. De Lamar by then had transferred his focus to Mercur, Utah.

During 1896–97, De Lamar acquired claims within the gold district of Mercur and had built a 500-ton cyanide process mill, later expanded to 1,000 ton, which was said to be the largest of the time, to work the mines. Jackling followed De Lamar to Utah as mill superintendent. During his Cripple Creek and Mercur operations years, he also invested in gold mines in Lincoln County, Nevada, that from 1896 to 1902 paid him $8,000,000 in profits. At the Delamar Mine, Nevada, the barrel-chlorinating process was installed in 1895 and soon later discarded in favour of fine grinding and cyaniding.

In 1902, De Lamar sold his Mercur and De Lamar, Nevada mines, for one million dollars each. To his discredit, the operation in the mill at De Lamar created such a fine particulate during the milling process that many workers were killed by inhaling the dust, the focus of medical study and accusation of De Lamar's inconsideration of his laborer's safety.

In the late 1890s, De Lamar had turned his attention to copper. While at Mercur, De Lamar became interested in the Bingham Canyon copper mines and sent Jackling and others to inspect the deposit. De Lamar would eventually acquire a portion of the canyon, but sold out to his former Cripple Creek partners, MacNeill and Spencer Penrose who would reap a fortune in copper at Bingham Canyon, Utah, with Jackling as their manager. In July 1899 De Lamar also purchased the Bully Hill mines, in the Shasta copper district of California, and financed the big copper smelter which was operating near there. A railroad project was installed to connect level 3 of the mine with the smelter, and the project became informally known as the De Lamar Railroad, which became part of the Sacramento Valley and Eastern Railway. Like his earlier operations, De Lamar unloaded the California property for a quick profit. Also, in 1901 he invested in mines near Yerington, Nevada and formed the Bluestone Mining & Smelting Company, one of his smaller yet still profitable operations sold after his death.

He next turned to Canada, taking over the great copper nickel lodes of Sudbury, Ontario and organized the International Nickel Company (Inco), a multinational mining corporation. In 1905 he and his International Nickel partners bought into the Nipissing Mine, located in Cobalt, Ontario, 300 miles north of Toronto. In May 1906, they hit the famed "Silver Sidewalk," a vein of nearly pure silver. De Lamar and his partners reportedly unloaded the property for $10 to $20 million. His next move was into the rich Porcupine district of Canada, where he became president of Dome Mines, a long-term gold producer. As Inco, Dome and his other operations reached peak production during the high mineral market prices of World War I, he was one of the wealthiest men in America at the time of his death in 1918.

Three former mining cities, which are today ghost towns, Delamar, Nevada, De Lamar, Idaho, and Delamar, California, were renamed after him; the last is now under water of Shasta Lake. The Delamar Mountains, a mountain range in Lincoln County, Nevada, as well a mountain summit in San Bernardino County, California, were also named after him. Delamar Mountain in California climbs to 8,376 feet (2,553 meters) above sea level.

== Other business ==
De Lamar was one of the most noted traders in Wall Street for over twenty years, and one of the leading financiers in the country. Besides his many mining properties, he was president of the Delta Beet Sugar Company; a director of the American Bank Note Company, Coronate Phosphate Company, American Sumatra Tobacco Company, Manhattan Sugar Company, the National Conduit and Cable Company and the Western Power Company.

== Political career ==
In 1891 De Lamar served as state senator in the first legislature of the new state of Idaho, and occupied the Chairmanship on Finance, Railroads and Constitutional Amendments. The Republican Party wanted him as their candidate for the U.S. Senate, but, as biographer G. W. Barrett shows, DeLamar was never interested in becoming the first U.S. Senator from Idaho and declined to continue in politics. He moved to New York.

De Lamar was known in Wall Street as "the man of mystery." He never talked much, his intimate friends say, but was uniformly successful in his transactions. He was part of the "community of interest" in big business that influenced politics, but he never again campaigned for office.

== Personal life ==
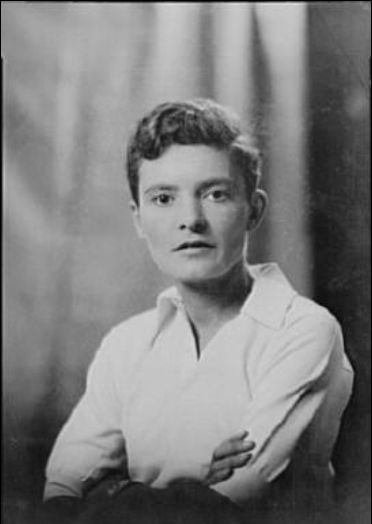
J. R.'s only child, Alice DeLamar

De Lamar married Nellie Virginia Sands on May 8, 1893, and they had one daughter together, Alice A. De Lamar. De Lamar was a member of the Lotus Club and the New York, Larchmont and Columbia Yacht Clubs. He was the owner of the yacht May and Sagitta, the fastest power boat on Long Island Sound. He was a great believer in aerial navigation and devoted considerable time to the study of the subject.

De Lamar was also an art connoisseur, a collector of fine paintings, statuary and other art objects. He was also a lover of music, but his greatest delight was in the gathering of rare plants and flowers, of which he possessed a notable collection. He left a large sum, estimated at $10,000,000, to the Harvard University Medical School, Johns Hopkins University, and the College of Physicians and Surgeons of Columbia University for research into the causes of disease and for the promulgation through lectures, publications, and otherwise of the principles of correct living.

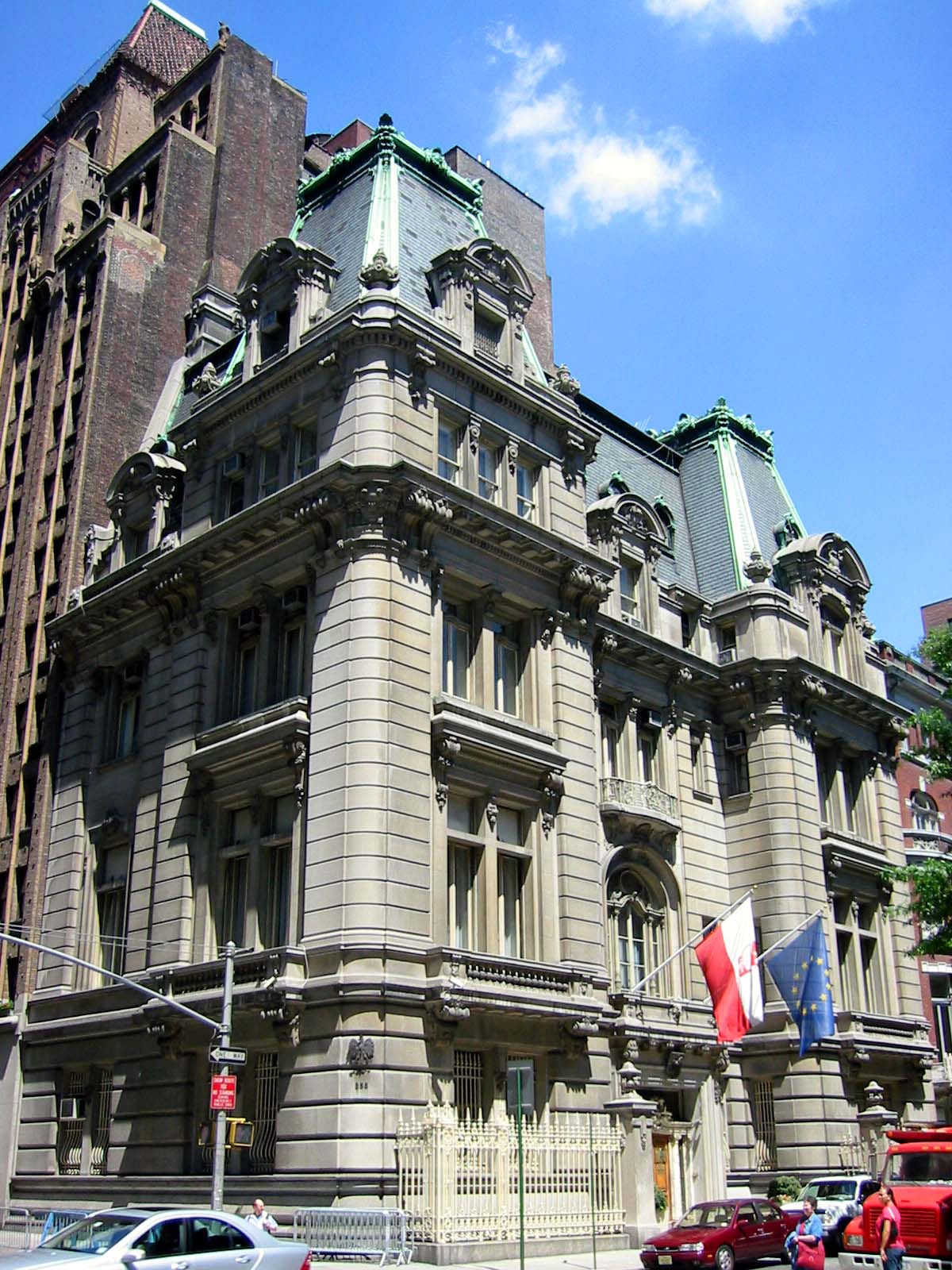
Joseph Raphael De Lamar House, at the corner at Madison Avenue and 37th Street

His house on Madison Avenue, built in 1904 for a reported $600,000, is today a New York City landmark building. In 1914 he built an eighty-room manor house, "Pembroke", on Long Island in the town of Glen Cove; author Rex Beach filmed his 1910s movie Too Fat to Fly on its grounds. The home contained a cave, or grotto, encrusted with stalactites. A statue of a nude woman stood in the shallow water and was reflected in a mirror set deep in the cave.

De Lamar died on December 1, 1918, at Roosevelt Hospital in Manhattan, New York City. In the press release of his death, the news writers said "the story of Captain DeLamar's life reads like a romance."

== Art patronage ==
De Lamar commissioned major works in stained glass by Tiffany Studios. Woman in a Pergola with Wisteria was originally the dramatic backdrop for an Aeolian organ console above the entrance to his palatial country home on Long Island's Gold Coast. The watercolor design drawing is in the collection of The Metropolitan Museum of Art. Like many mansions from the Gilded Age, Pembroke was razed in 1968. The collector, Walter Chrysler, Jr. bought the window at auction in the 1970s. Today, this stunning window is an icon in The Chrysler Museum of Art's glass collection and is on permanent display in the museum in Norfolk, Virginia. Additional windows and a skylight from Pembroke remain in private collections.

== In popular culture ==
Joseph and Alice De Lamar's lives were the subject of the In Search of... season 4 episode, "The Missing Heirs".
