= William Scoresby (disambiguation) =

William Scoresby (1789–1857) was an English explorer.

William Scoresby may also refer to:

- William Scoresby (1760–1829), English explorer
- William F. Scoresby (1840–1884), American politician
- RRS William Scoresby, a British Royal Research Ship
