= Carchesium =

Carchesium may refer to:

- Carchesium (container), a kind of Greek and Roman drinkware
- Carchesium (ciliate), named for its supposed resemblance to the ancient drinkware
