= Robert Edmund Scoresby-Jackson =

British physician and historian

Robert Edmund Scoresby-Jackson FRSE FRCPE FRCSE (1833–1867) was a short-lived but influential British physician and historian. He specialised in the effects of climate upon health.

== Life ==
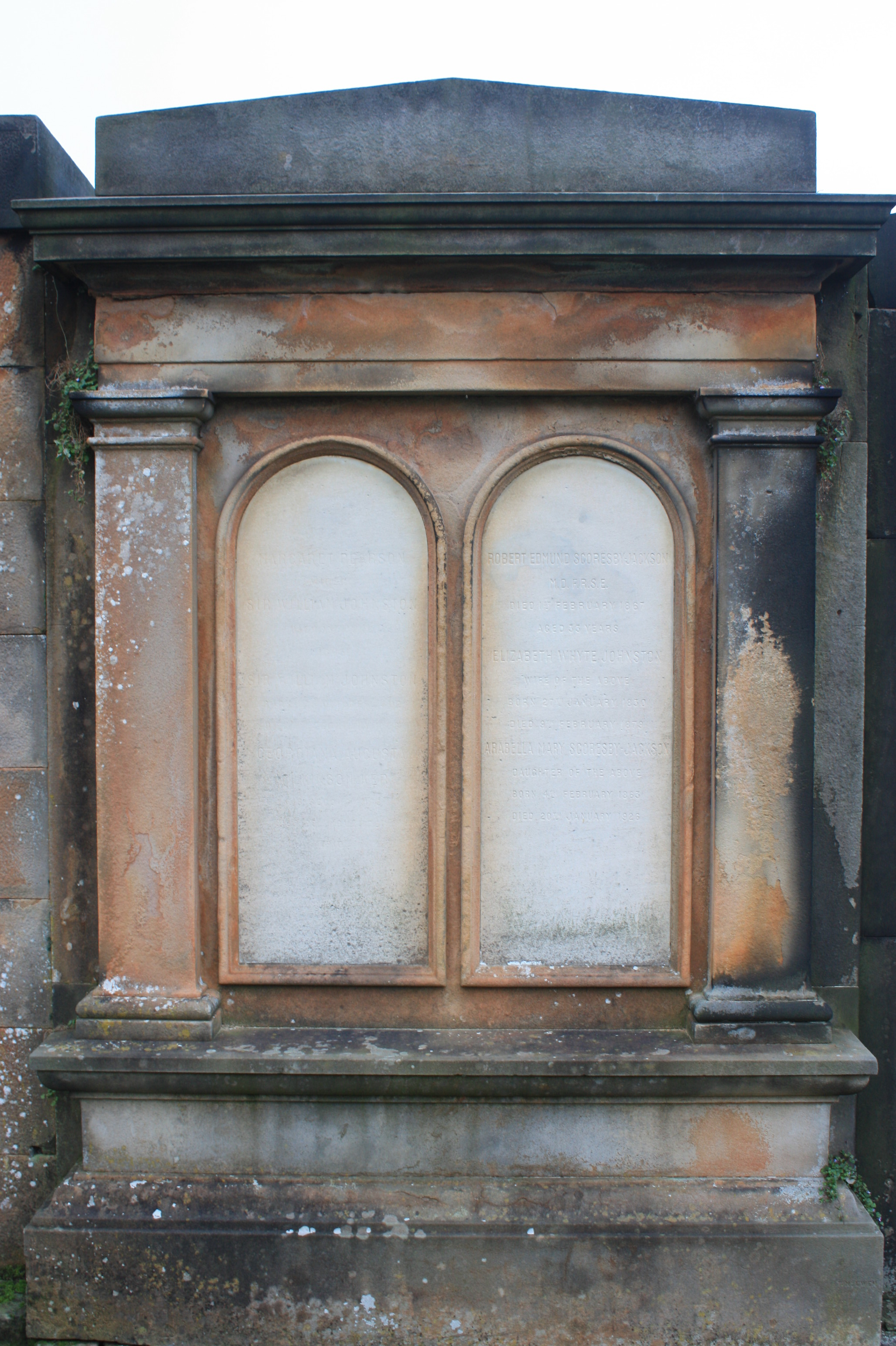
The grave of Robert Edmund Scoresby-Jackson, Grange Cemetery, Edinburgh

He was born Robert Edmund Jackson on 12 November 1833 in Whitby on the Yorkshire coast. He was the son of Captain Thomas Jackson (1787–1873), a merchant mariner and shipowner, and his wife Arabella Scoresby (1792–1881), sister of Rev William Scoresby. Both his parents outlived him. He adopted the name Scoresby-Jackson on the death of his uncle.

He studied medicine at St Georges Hospital in London, the University of Edinburgh (under Robert Christison) and Paris. He gained his doctorate (MD) in 1857, presenting the thesis "Climate, health, and disease". In 1860 he was elected a member of the Harveian Society of Edinburgh. In 1861 he was elected a Fellow of the Royal Society of Edinburgh his proposer was John Hutton Balfour.

From 1865 he lectured in Materia Medica and Therapeutics at the University of Edinburgh and at the Edinburgh Extramural School of Medicine.. He was in the same year made a Physician at Edinburgh Royal Infirmary.

In 1867 he undertook a study on typhus. He died aged only 33 of typhus, at his home, 32 Queen Street in Edinburgh's First New Town on 1 February 1867, in the presence of his father-in-law Sir William Johnston. He is buried with his in-laws in Grange Cemetery on the south side of the city. The grave lies on the eastern wall around 50m from the south-east corner.

== Family ==
In 1858 he married Elizabeth Whyte Johnston (1830–1897), daughter of Sir William Johnston of Kirkhill in Liberton, Edinburgh. They had two daughters, including Arabella Mary Scoresby-Jackson (1863–1926).

== Publications ==
- Climate Health and Disease (1857)
- The Life of William Scoresby DD (1861)
- Medical Climatology (1862)
- A Notebook on Materia Medica, Pharmacology and Therapeutics (1866) (revised by F W Moinet in 1880)
