= Whitby =

Coastal town in North Yorkshire, England

- Town
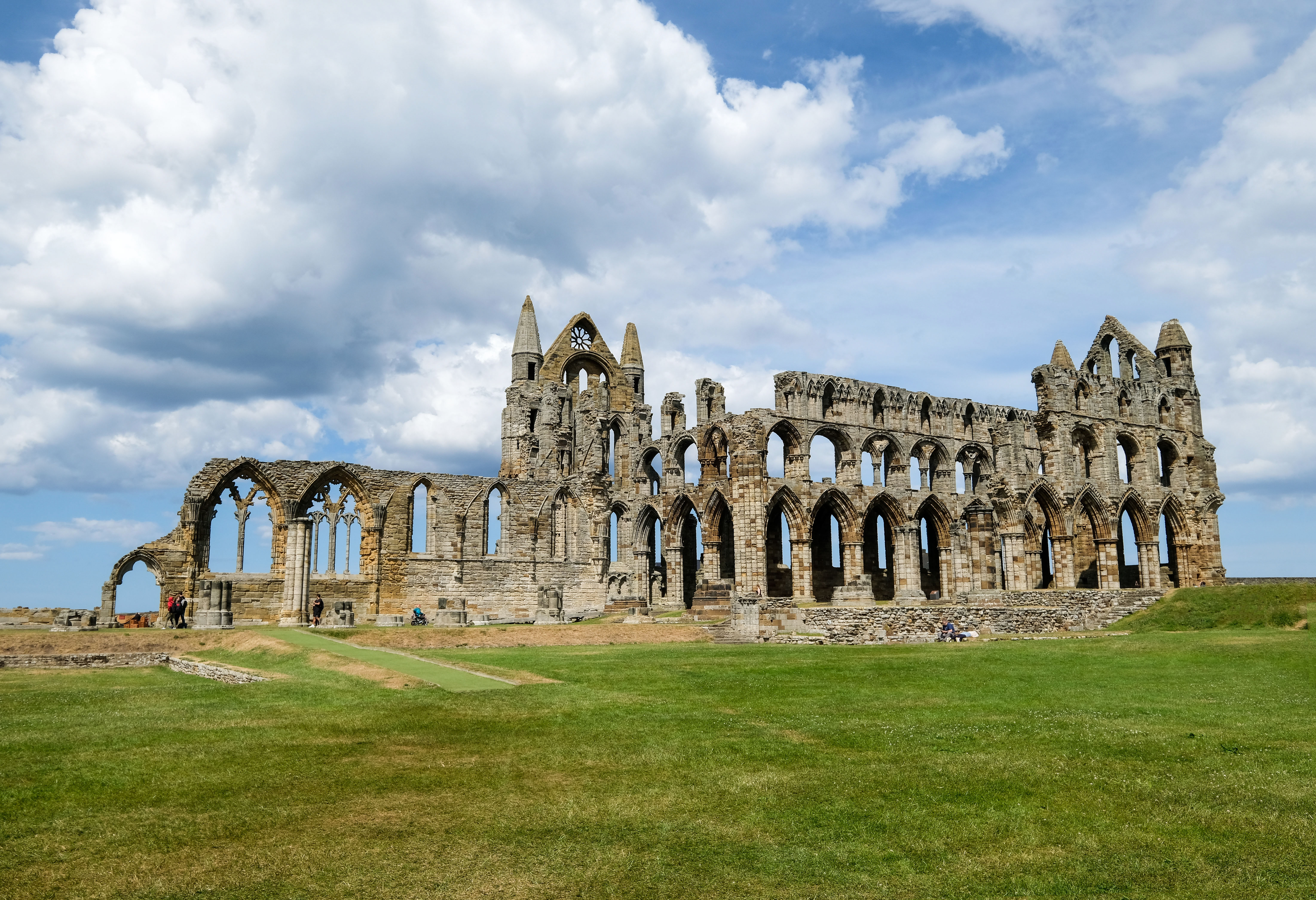
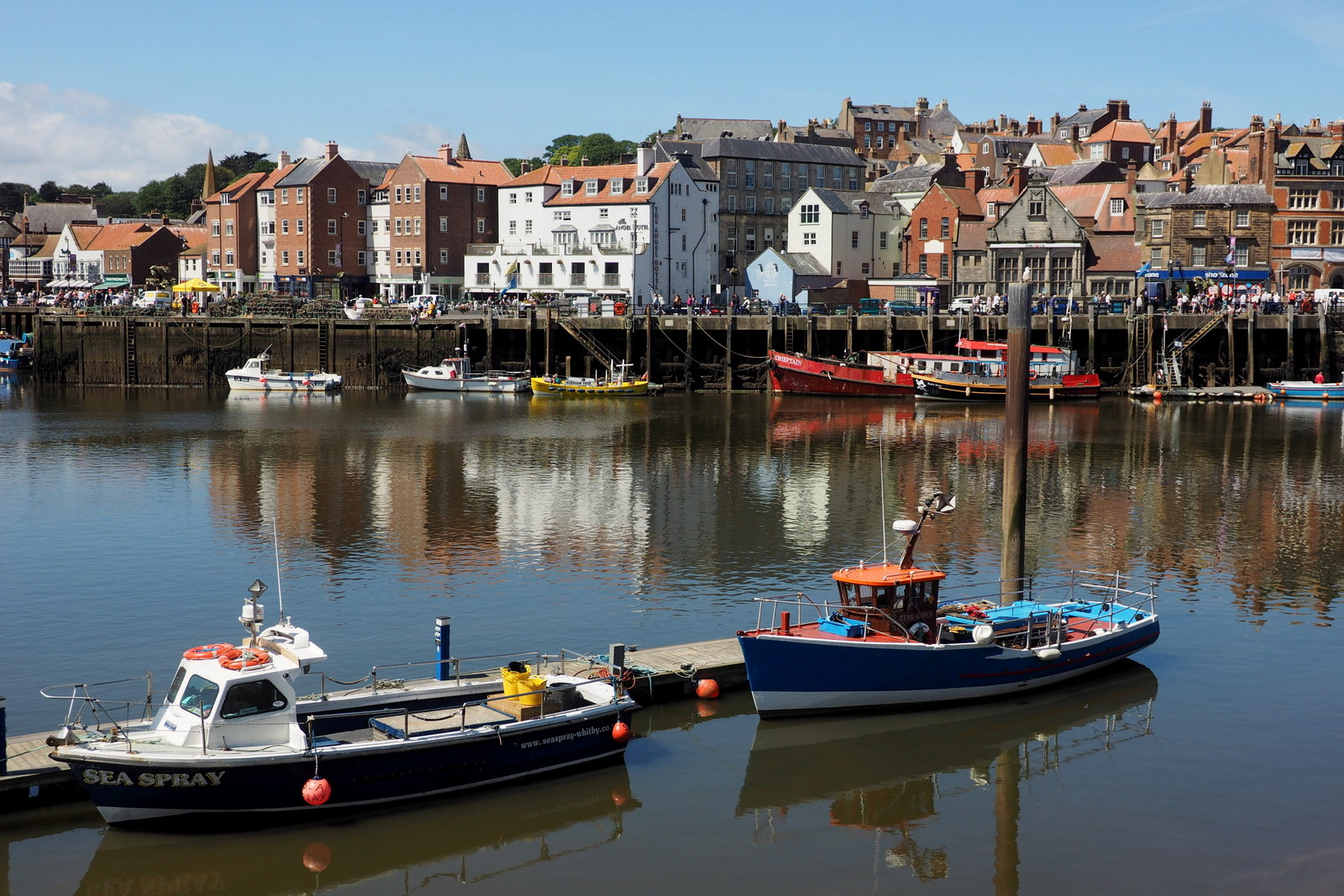
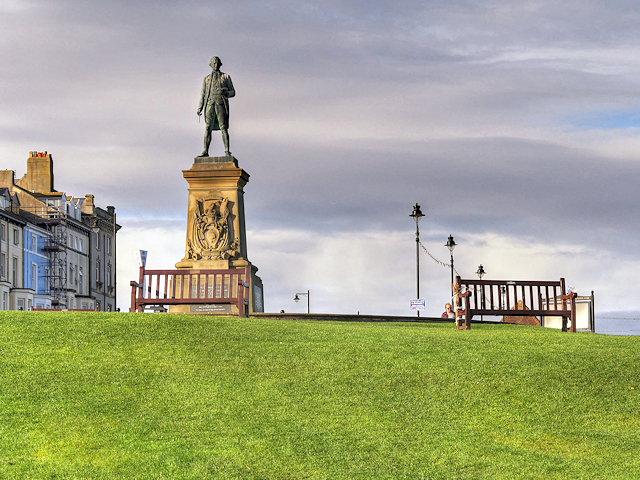
- Whitby Abbey Old Town Hall Harbour Abbey Steps Captain Cook Statue

- Arms of Whitby Town Council

- Location within North Yorkshire
- Population: 13,213 (2011 census)
- OS grid reference: NZ893109
- Civil parish: Whitby
- Unitary authority: North Yorkshire
- Ceremonial county: North Yorkshire
- Region: Yorkshire and the Humber
- Country: England
- Sovereign state: United Kingdom
- Post town: WHITBY
- Postcode district: YO21, YO22
- Dialling code: 01947
- Police: North Yorkshire
- Fire: North Yorkshire
- Ambulance: Yorkshire
- UK Parliament: Scarborough and Whitby

Whitby is a seaside town, port and civil parish in North Yorkshire, England. It is located at the mouth of the River Esk, where the North York Moors meet the Yorkshire Coast, and has a maritime, mineral and tourist economy. It is 47 miles (76 km) from York and 22 miles (35 km) from Middlesbrough.

From the Middle Ages, Whitby had significant herring and whaling fleets, and was where Captain Cook learned seamanship. He first explored the southern ocean in HMS Endeavour, built in Whitby. Alum was mined locally, and Whitby jet jewellery was fashionable during the 19th century.

Tourism started in Whitby during the Georgian period and developed with the arrival of the railway in 1839. The abbey ruin at the top of the East Cliff is the town's oldest and most prominent landmark. Other significant features include the swing bridge, which crosses the River Esk and the harbour sheltered by grade II listed east and west piers. There are statues of Captain Cook and William Scoresby, and a whale bone arch on the West Cliff. Whitby has featured in literary works including Bram Stoker's novel Dracula.

== History ==
=== Priests and harrying ===
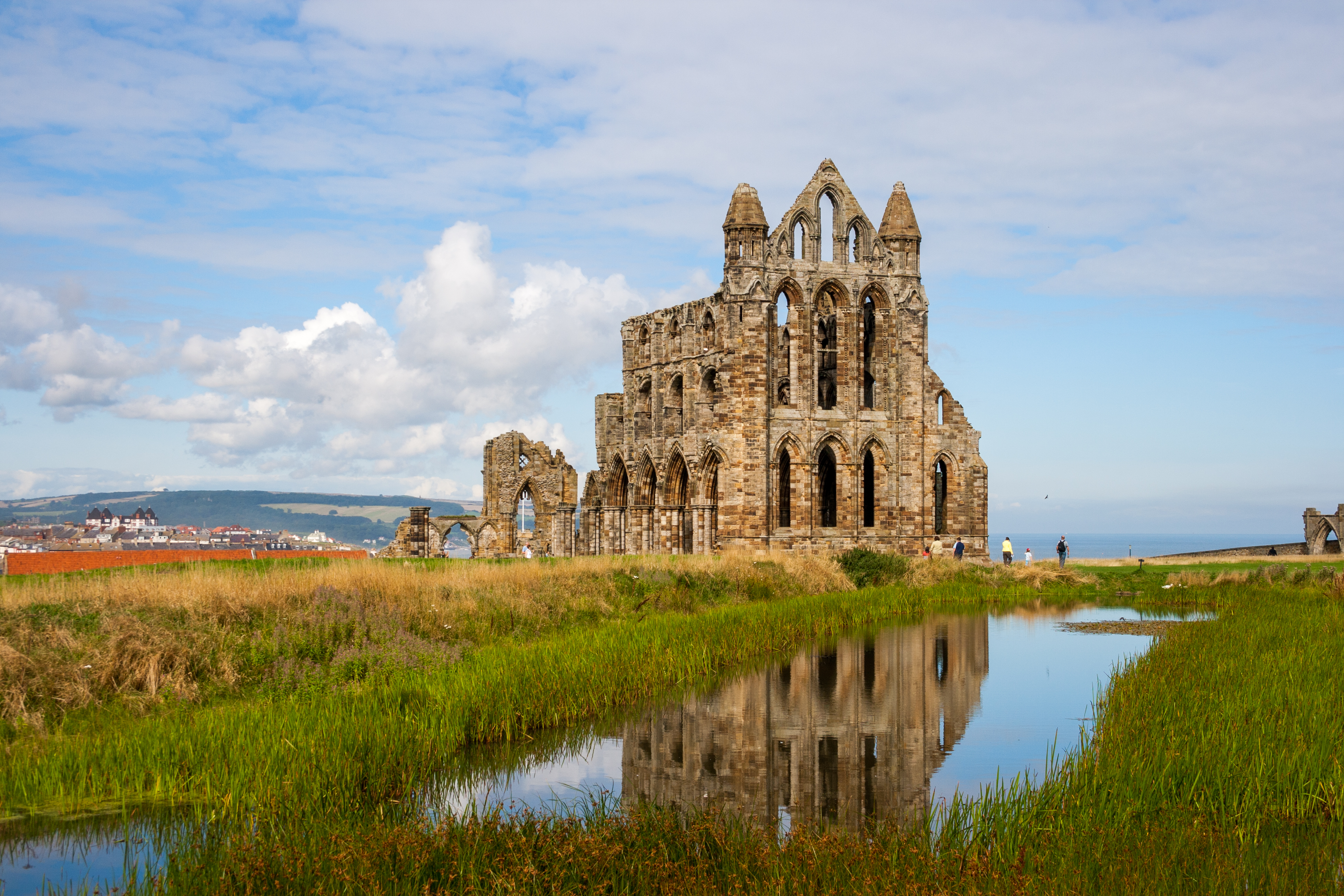
The ruins of Whitby Abbey are reflected in the abbey pond.

Whitby was known in the Anglo-Saxon period as Streoneshalh, meaning "Streon's nook of land". The modern name, which first appears in the Domesday Book, means "Hvíta's farmstead", from Old Norse Hvítabýr.

A monastery was founded at Streoneshalh in 657 AD by King Oswiu or Oswy of Northumbria, as an act of thanksgiving, after defeating Penda, the pagan king of Mercia. At its foundation, the abbey was an Anglo-Saxon "double monastery" for men and women. Its first abbess, the royal princess Hild, was later venerated as a saint. The abbey became a centre of learning, and here Cædmon the cowherd was "miraculously" transformed into an inspired poet whose poetry is an example of Anglo-Saxon literature. The abbey became the leading royal nunnery of the kingdom of Deira, and the burial-place of its royal family. The Synod of Whitby, in 664, established the Roman date of Easter in Northumbria at the expense of the Celtic one.

The monastery was destroyed between 867 and 870 in a series of raids by Vikings from Denmark under their leaders Ingwar and Ubba. Its site remained desolate for more than 200 years until after the Norman Conquest of England in 1066. After the Conquest, the area was granted to William de Percy who, in 1078 donated land to found a Benedictine monastery dedicated to St Peter and St Hilda. William de Percy's gift included land for the monastery, the town and port of Whitby and St Mary's Church and dependent chapels at Fyling, Hawsker, Sneaton, Ugglebarnby, Dunsley, and Aislaby, five mills including Ruswarp, Hackness with two mills and two churches.

When the Domesday Book was compiled in 1086, Whitby was recorded being partially waste and a small settlement lying within the Langbaurgh Wapentake of Yorkshire. Further details reveal the state of Whitby's economic and agricultural decline (when compared with its pre-Conquest state under Earl Siward) which were due to the depredations of William the Conqueror's army during the Harrying of the North in 1069–70.

In about 1128 Henry I granted the abbey burgage in Whitby and permission to hold a fair at the feast of St Hilda on 25 August. A second fair was held close to St Hilda's winter feast at Martinmas. Market rights were granted to the abbey and descended with the liberty.

=== Dissolution, blubber and Cook ===
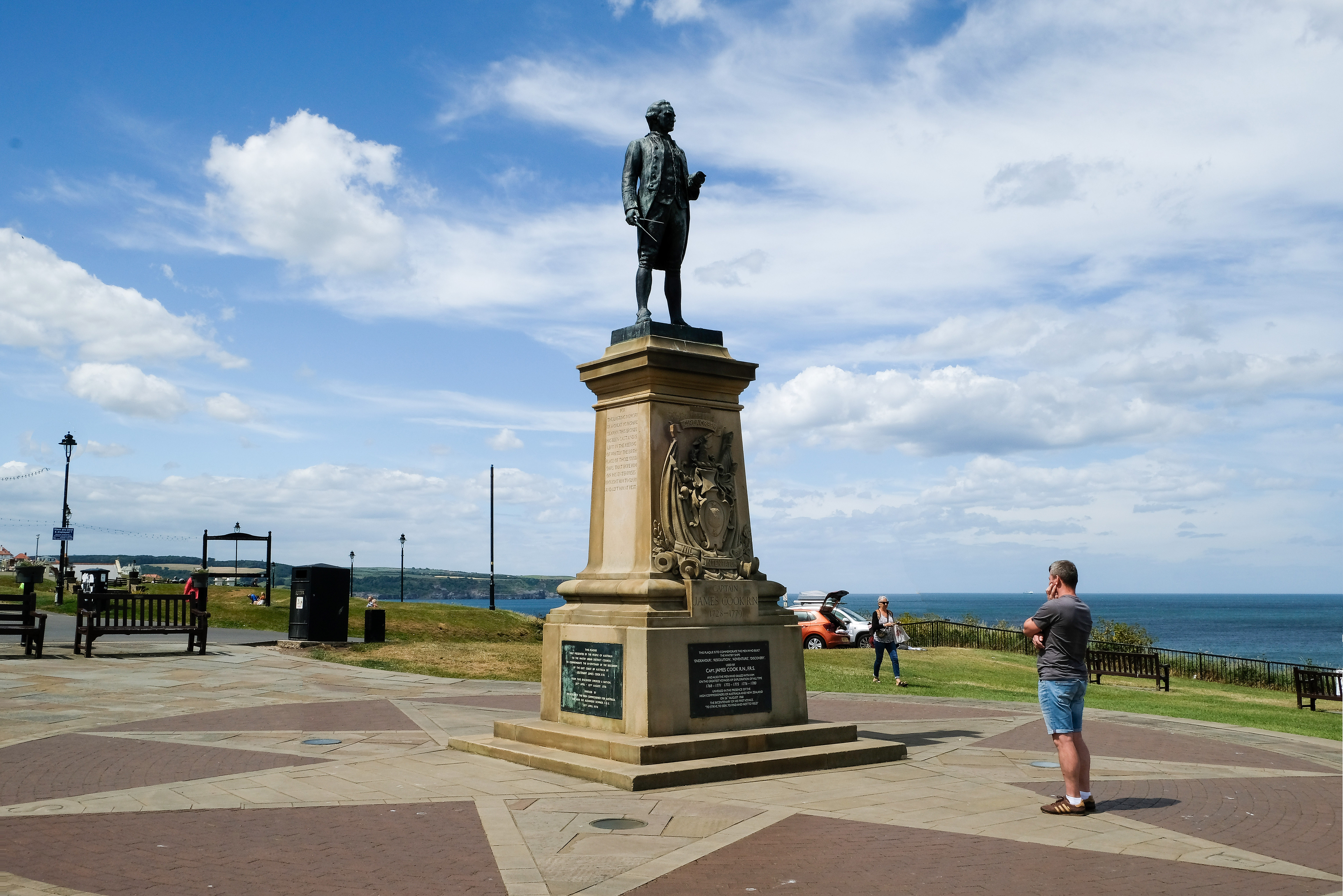
Captain Cook's statue

Whitby Abbey surrendered in December 1539 when Henry VIII dissolved the monasteries. By 1540 the town had between 20 and 30 houses and a population of about 200. The burgesses, who had little independence under the abbey, tried to obtain self-government after the dissolution of the monasteries. The king ordered Letters Patent to be drawn up granting their requests, but it was not implemented. In 1550 the Liberty of Whitby Strand, except for Hackness, was granted to the Earl of Warwick who in 1551 conveyed it to Sir John York and his wife Anne who sold the lease to the Cholmleys. In the reign of Elizabeth I, Whitby was a small fishing port. In 1635 the owners of the liberty governed the port and town where 24 burgesses had the privilege of buying and selling goods brought in by sea. Burgage tenure continued until the Whitby (Yorkshire) Improvement Act 1837 (7 Will. 4 & 1 Vict. c. x) entrusted government of the town to a board of improvement commissioners, elected by the ratepayers.

At the end of the 16th century Thomas Chaloner visited alum works in the Papal States, where he observed that the rock being processed was similar to that under his Guisborough estate. At that time alum was important for medicinal uses, in curing leather and for fixing dyed cloths and the Papal States and Spain maintained monopolies on its production and sale. Chaloner secretly brought workmen to develop the industry in Yorkshire, and alum was produced near Sandsend Ness 3 miles (5 km) from Whitby in the reign of James I. Once the industry was established, imports were banned and although the methods in its production were laborious, England became self-sufficient. Whitby grew significantly as a port as a result of the alum trade and by importing coal from the Durham coalfield to process it.

Whitby grew in size and wealth, extending its activities to include shipbuilding using local oak timber. In 1790–91 Whitby built 11,754 tons of shipping, making it the third largest shipbuilder in England, after London and Newcastle. Taxes on imports entering the port raised money to improve and extend the town's twin piers, improving the harbour and permitting further increases in trade. In 1753 the first whaling ship set sail to Greenland and by 1795 Whitby had become a major whaling port. The most successful year was 1814 when eight ships caught 172 whales, and the whaler, the Resolution's catch produced 230 tons of oil. The carcases yielded 42 tons of whalebone used for 'stays' which were used in the corsetry trade until changes in fashion made them redundant. Blubber was boiled to produce oil for use in lamps in four oil houses on the harbourside. Oil was used for street lighting until the spread of gas lighting reduced demand and the Whitby Whale Oil and Gas Company changed into the Whitby Coal and Gas Company. As the market for whale products fell, catches became too small to be economic and by 1831 only one whaling ship, the Phoenix, remained.

Whitby benefited from trade between the Newcastle coalfield and London, both by shipbuilding and supplying transport. In his youth the explorer James Cook learned his trade on colliers, shipping coal from the port. HMS Endeavour, the ship commanded by Cook on his voyage to Australia and New Zealand, was built in Whitby in 1764 by Thomas Fishburn as a coal carrier named Earl of Pembroke. She was bought by the Royal Navy 1768, refitted and renamed.

Whitby developed as a spa town in Georgian times when three chalybeate springs were in demand for their medicinal and tonic qualities. Visitors were attracted to the town leading to the building of "lodging-houses" and hotels, particularly on the West Cliff.

=== Rail and jet ===
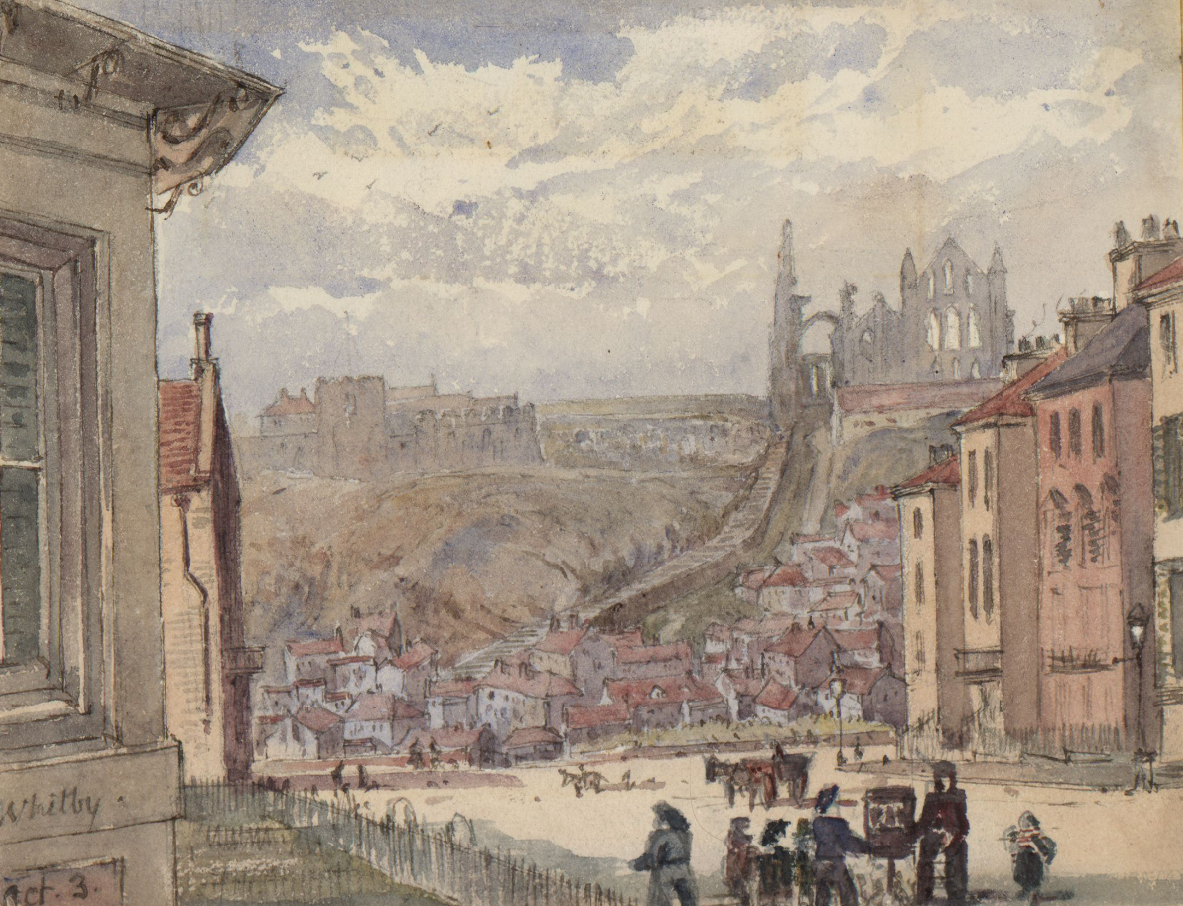
Whitby town from Abbey Terrace, sketched on 3 October 1861, looking across to Whitby Abbey

In 1839, the very early Whitby and Pickering Railway opened, connecting Whitby to Pickering, with a mixture of horse haulage on level sections and cable haulage on steeper sections. In 1845 the York and North Midland Railway bought this line, extended it to York, and gradually converted it for the use of steam locomotives. This line played a part in the town's development as a tourism destination, and George Hudson, who promoted the link to York, was responsible for the development of the town's partially-completed Royal Crescent. For 12 years from 1847, Robert Stephenson, son of George Stephenson, engineer to the Whitby and Pickering Railway, was the Conservative MP for the town promoted by Hudson as a fellow protectionist.

In 1854, the line from York and Pickering became part of the North Eastern Railway. In 1865, this company completed its Esk Valley Line, using the earlier line as far as Grosmont, where it diverged to follow the Esk Valley as far as Battersby, where separate lines linked to Northallerton and Middlesbrough.

In 1883, the Whitby, Redcar and Middlesbrough Union Railway opened from Loftus to Whitby, providing a second link from Middlesbrough to Whitby, via Redcar. It ran close to the cliffs to the north of the town and served a station at Whitby West Cliff before descending on a steep gradient to join the Esk Valley Line just west of its terminus. Two years later, in 1885, the Scarborough and Whitby Railway opened, following a coastal route from Scarborough and requiring construction of the red brick Larpool Viaduct across the Esk Valley at a high level. It joined the Whitby, Redcar and Middlesbrough Union Railway just to the south of the latter's Whitby West Cliff station, and any trains between Scarborough and Whitby had to reverse at West Cliff. Both lines were operated by the North Eastern Railway from their opening, and eventually acquired by it.

The black mineraloid jet, the compressed remains of ancestors of the monkey-puzzle tree, is found in the cliffs and on the moors and has been used since the Bronze Age to make beads. The Romans are known to have mined it in the area. In Victorian times jet was brought to Whitby by pack pony to be made into decorative items. It was at the peak of its popularity in the mid-19th century when it was favoured for mourning jewellery by Queen Victoria after the death of Prince Albert.

The advent of iron ships in the late 19th century and the development of port facilities on the River Tees led to the decline of smaller Yorkshire harbours. The Monks-haven launched in 1871 was the last wooden ship built in Whitby, and a year later the harbour was silted up.

=== 20th century ===
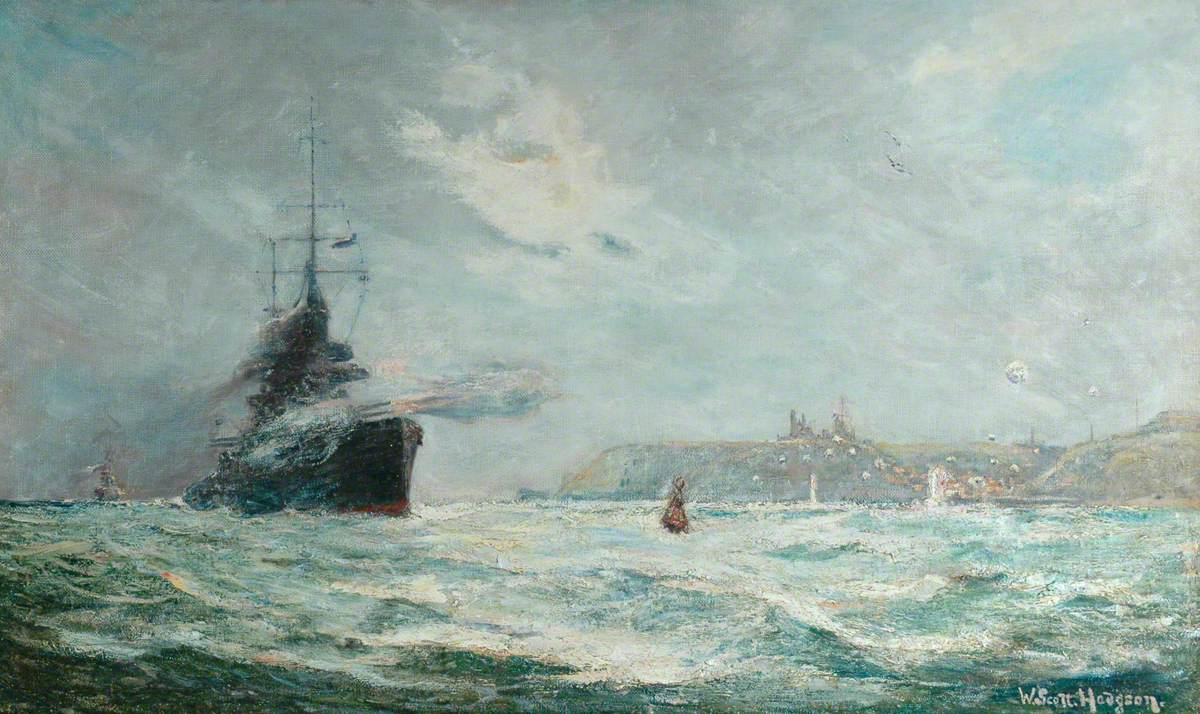
The Bombardment of Whitby, 16 December 1914, by William Scott Hodgson

On 30 October 1914, the hospital ship Rohilla was sunk, hitting the rocks within sight of shore just off Whitby at Saltwick Bay. Of the 220 people on board, 74 died in the disaster, with 33 of those being buried in Whitby Cemetery.

In a raid on Scarborough, Hartlepool and Whitby in December 1914, the town was shelled by the German battlecruisers Von der Tann and Derfflinger. In the final assault on the Yorkshire coast, the ships aimed their guns at the signal post on the end of the headland. Whitby Abbey sustained considerable damage in the attack, which lasted ten minutes. The German squadron responsible for the strike escaped despite attempts made by the Royal Navy.

The former Whitby, Redcar and Middlesbrough Union Railway closed between Loftus and Whitby West Cliff station in 1958. The section between West Cliff and Whitby stations remained open for use by trains from Scarborough until 1965, when the line from Scarborough closed. In the same year, the line between Malton, Pickering and Grosmont closed, severing Whitby's direct connection to York and points south, although the section between Grosmont and Pickering subsequently reopened as the preserved North Yorkshire Moors Railway. The trackbed of the Whitby to Scarborough Line, including the Larpool Viaduct, is now used as a footpath, bridleway and by cyclists.

During the early 20th century the fishing fleet kept the harbour busy, and few cargo boats used the port. It was revitalised as a result of a strike at Hull docks in 1955, when six ships were diverted and unloaded their cargoes on the fish quay. Endeavour Wharf, near the railway station, was opened in 1964 by the local council. The number of vessels using the port in 1972 was 291, increased from 64 in 1964. Timber, paper and chemicals are imported, while exports include steel, furnace-bricks and doors. The port is owned and managed by Scarborough Borough Council since the Harbour Commissioners relinquished responsibility in 1905.

A marina was started in 1979 by dredging the upper harbour and laying pontoons. Light industry and car parks occupy the adjacent land. More pontoons were completed in 1991 and 1995. The Whitby Marina Facilities Centre was opened in June 2010.

== Governance ==
Whitby Town Council

Type
- Type: Town Council

Leadership
- Mayor: Robert Dalrymple
- Town clerk: Michael King
- Seats: 19 Councillors

Elections
- Last election: 2 May 2023
- Next election: 7 May 2027

Meeting place
- Whitby Museum

Website
- www.whitbytowncouncil.gov.uk

By an Act of 1837 government of the town was entrusted to a board of Improvement Commissioners, elected by the ratepayers. A Local Board was formed in 1872, and lasted until Whitby Urban District Council was formed under the Local Government Act 1894. The townships of Whitby, Ruswarp and Hawsker-cum-Stainsacre were formed into a Parliamentary borough under the Reform Act 1832 returning one member until the Redistribution of Seats Act 1885.

In the current UK Parliament, the town is represented by Alison Hume of the Labour Party, who was elected as the Member of Parliament (MP) for the Scarborough and Whitby constituency in 2024. In the 2024 general election, a stereotypical voter was identified named the "Whitby woman".

From 1974 to 2023 Whitby was administered as part of a two tier council system by Scarborough Borough Council, one of the seven district councils in North Yorkshire. For borough council purposes the town comprised three wards: Mayfield, Streonshalh and Whitby West Cliff. The borough council was a non-metropolitan district, responsible for housing, planning, leisure and recreation, waste collection, environmental health and revenue collection. Above the Borough council was North Yorkshire County Council, which was a non-metropolitan county providing education, transport, highways, fire, waste disposal, social and library services.

In April 2023 both the county and district councils were replaced by the unitary North Yorkshire Council, which now provides all the services previously provided separately by the two councils. The town comprises two electoral divisions, Whitby West and Whitby Streonshalh, each represented by a single councillor. Whitby West is represented by Phil Trumper of the Conservative Party, whilst Whitby Streonshalh is represented by Neil Swannick of the Labour Party.

At the lowest level of governance Whitby has a town council which, for election and administrative purposes, is divided into six electoral wards represented by 19 councillors responsible for burial grounds, allotments, play areas and street lighting. Elections to the town council are held every four years.

== Religion ==
St Mary's Church

In the three wards that make up the Whitby district of North Yorkshire, out of a population of 13,596 there are 10,286 who stated that their religion was Christian in the 2001 UK census. There were 19 Muslims, 17 Buddhists, 12 Jews, 3 Sikhs and 499 people had no religious affiliations.

St Mary's Church is an ancient foundation, St Ninian's opened in Baxtergate in 1778 and St John's, also on Baxtergate, was consecrated in 1850. St Michael's was opened in 1856 and St Hilda's on the West Cliff was built in 1885. The Roman Catholic church dedicated to St Hilda was built in 1867 on Baxtergate. There are places of worship for nonconformists including a United Reformed Church; two Methodist chapels are no longer used. The Mission to Seafarers maintains a Christian ministry and has a chapel, reading room and recreational facilities.

The Bishop of Whitby is a suffragan bishop of the Church of England Diocese of York, in the Province of York. The town lies within the Central Vicariate of the Roman Catholic Diocese of Middlesbrough.

== Geography ==
Whitby is situated on the east coast of Yorkshire facing the North Sea in a deep valley at the mouth of the River Esk. It has been a bridging point since at least medieval times and several bridges have spanned the river. The current bridge, built in 1908, is a swing bridge with a 75-foot (23 m) span that separates the upper and lower harbours which have a total area of around 80.1 acres (32.40 ha). The houses are built of brick or stone, often with red pantiled roofs, in narrow, steep streets, on both sides of the river.

The town is surrounded on its landward sides by the moorland of the North York Moors National Park and the North Sea abuts it on the seaward side. The coastal areas are designated part of the North Yorkshire and Cleveland Heritage Coast. The harbour and the mouth of the River Esk are on a geological fault. On the east side the cliff is tall, 187 feet (57 m), and consists of alternating layers of shale, sandstone and clay. On the west side the cliff is much lower and has a deep capping of boulder clay over a sandstone base making it less stable and liable to slippage. Both cliffs are being eroded quite rapidly.

=== Fossils and snakestones ===
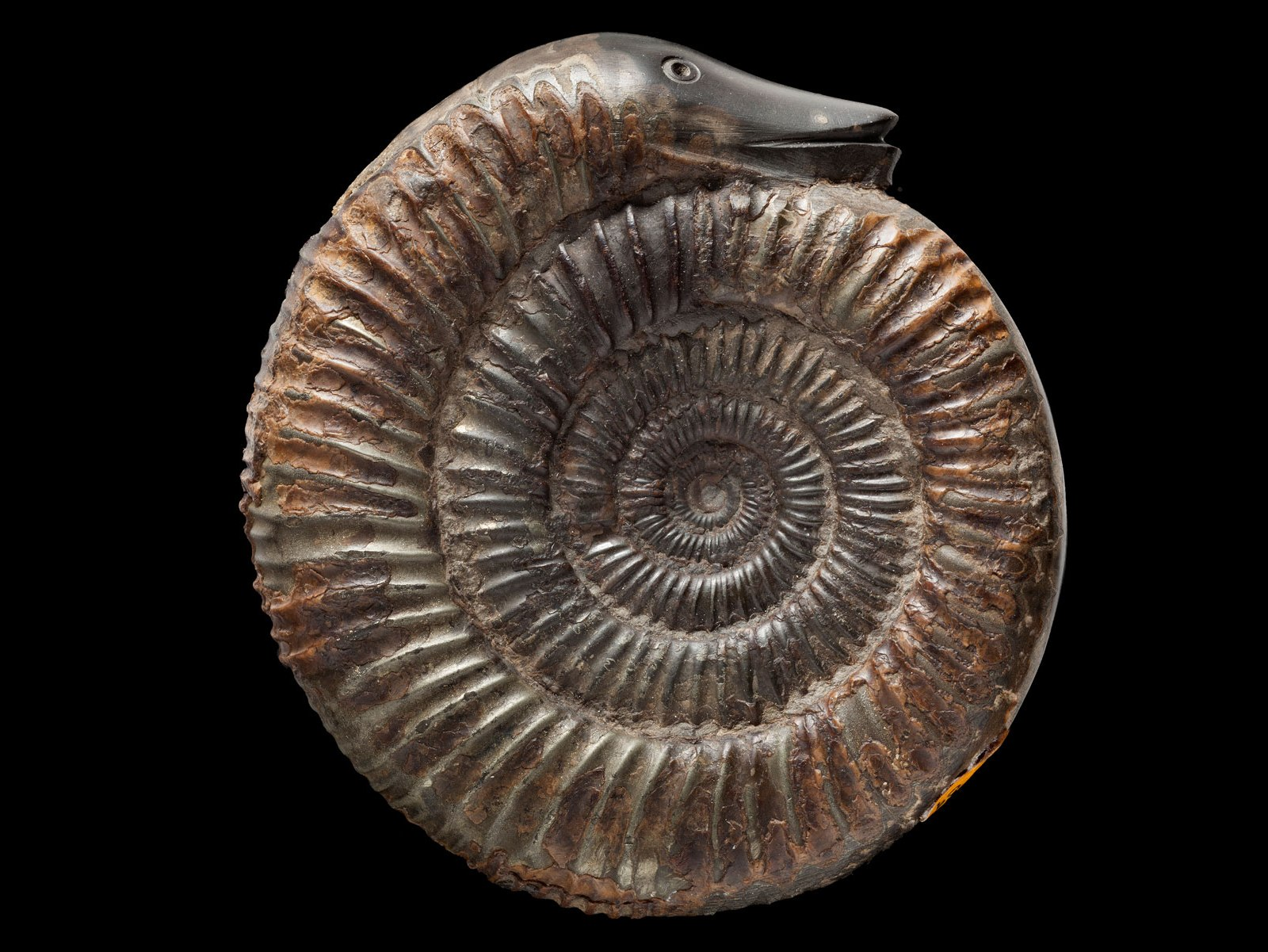
A snakestone from near Whitby, with head carved onto a specimen of Dactylioceras commune (Sowerby, 1815), Whitby Formation, Toarcian Stage, late Lower Jurassic. Specimen in the Natural History Museum, London.

The town is a coastal stretch known as the Dinosaur Coast or the Fossil Coast, the area is around 35 miles (56 km) long and stretches from Staithes in the north and south to Flamborough. At Whitby dinosaur footprints are visible on the beach. The rock strata contain fossils and organic remains including jet. Fossils include the petrified bones of an almost complete crocodile and a specimen of plesiosaurus measuring 15 feet 6 inches (4.72 m) in length, and 8 feet 5 inches (2.57 m) in breadth was discovered in 1841. The Rotunda Museum in Scarborough has a comprehensive collection of fossils from the area.

Smaller fossils include numerous species of ammonites, or "snake stones", from the Whitby Mudstone Formation (Alum Shale Member) and at Whitby Scar nautiloids in the lower beds of the lias strata. The town's folklore (similar to Keynsham's in Somerset) has it that fossils were once living serpents that were common in the area. This was until the 7th century AD when Anglo-Saxon Abbess St Hilda of Whitby (614–680), first had to rid the region of snakes. She did so by casting a spell that turned them to stone and then threw them from the cliff tops.

Local collectors and dealers in fossils often carved heads on ammonites to increase curiosity value and improve sales. Since 1935, the Whitby Coat of Arms incorporates three snakestones due to this folklore. The Hildoceras genus of ammonite is named in St Hilda's honour.

== Economy ==
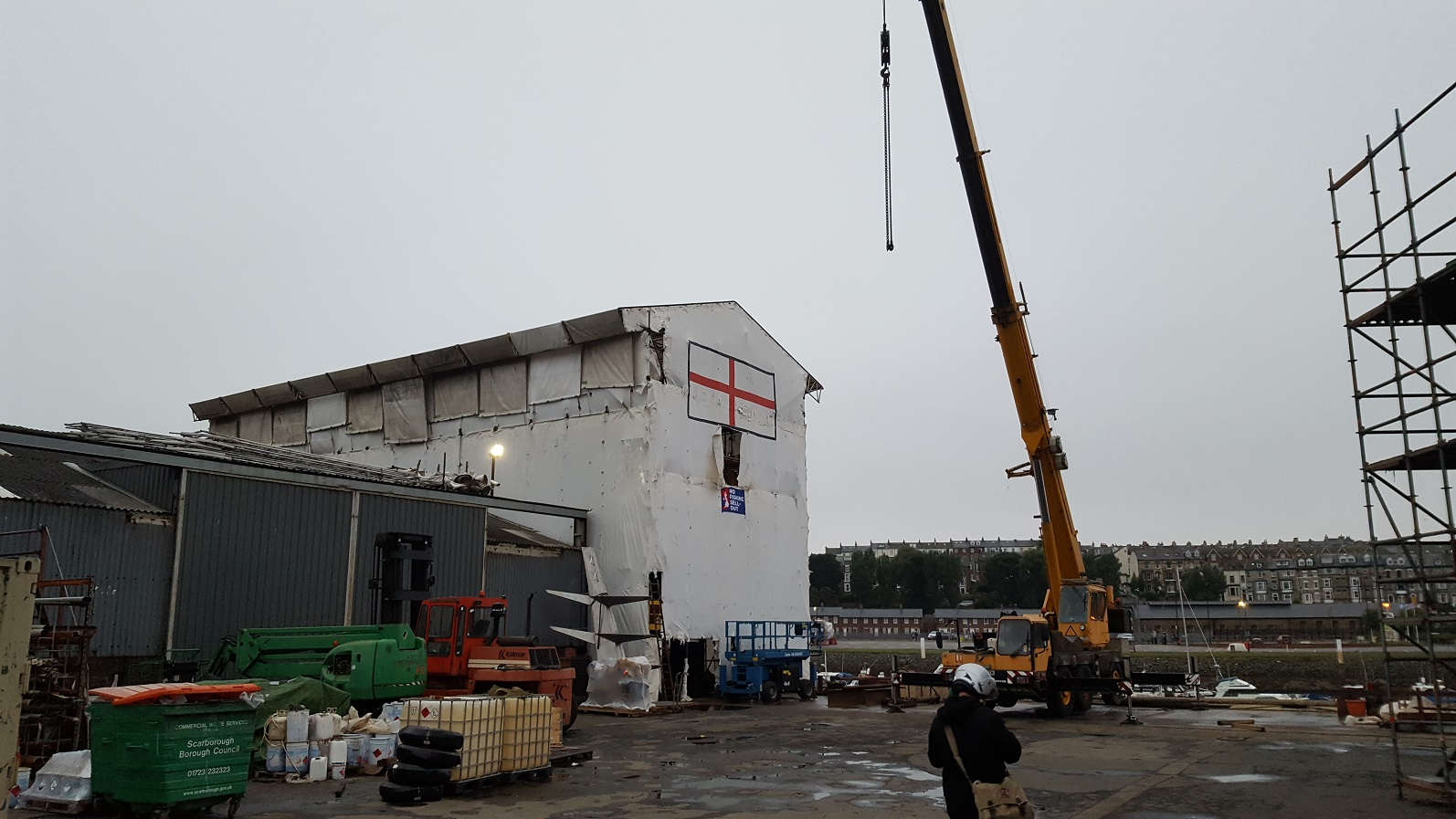
Shipbuilding in Whitby

Tourism supported by fishing is the mainstay of Whitby's economy in an isolated community with poor transport infrastructure and restricted by building constraints in the surrounding North York Moors National Park. The economy is governed by the changing fortunes of fishing, tourism and to some extent, manufacturing. Structural changes have led to concentrations of deprivation, unemployment and benefit dependence. A narrowing employment base and dependence on low wage and low skill sectors has resulted in younger age groups leaving the area. There are few business start-ups and small and medium-sized enterprises. Older people who make increasing demands on the area's health and social care capacity have moved into the area. Demographic changes, Whitby's relative isolation from the region's main growth areas and decline in traditional employment sectors pose an economic challenge.

The town has a variety of self-catering accommodation, holiday cottages, caravans and campsites, and guest houses, inns, bed & breakfast establishments and hotels. The jet industry declined at the end of the 19th century, but eight shops sell jet jewellery, mainly as souvenirs to tourists. In 1996, Whitby West Cliff qualified for a 'Tidy Britain Group Seaside Award'. The town was awarded "Best Seaside Resort 2006", by Which? Holiday magazine.

The harbour has a total area of about 80 acres (32 ha) and is used by commercial, fishing and pleasure craft. Inshore fishing, particularly for crustaceans and line fish, takes place along the coast. Lobsters, brown and velvet crabs are important to the local fishery. From May to August, salmon is found in the Esk, and small open boats are licensed to net these off the harbour entrance. There are around 40 licensed angling party boats. The commercial catch is no longer herring but has been replaced by cod, haddock, and other fish caught within 12 miles (19 km) of the coast. A fish market on the quayside operates as need arises. The ready supply of fresh fish has resulted in an abundance of "chippies" in the town, including the Magpie Cafe which Rick Stein has described as the best fish and chip shop in Britain.

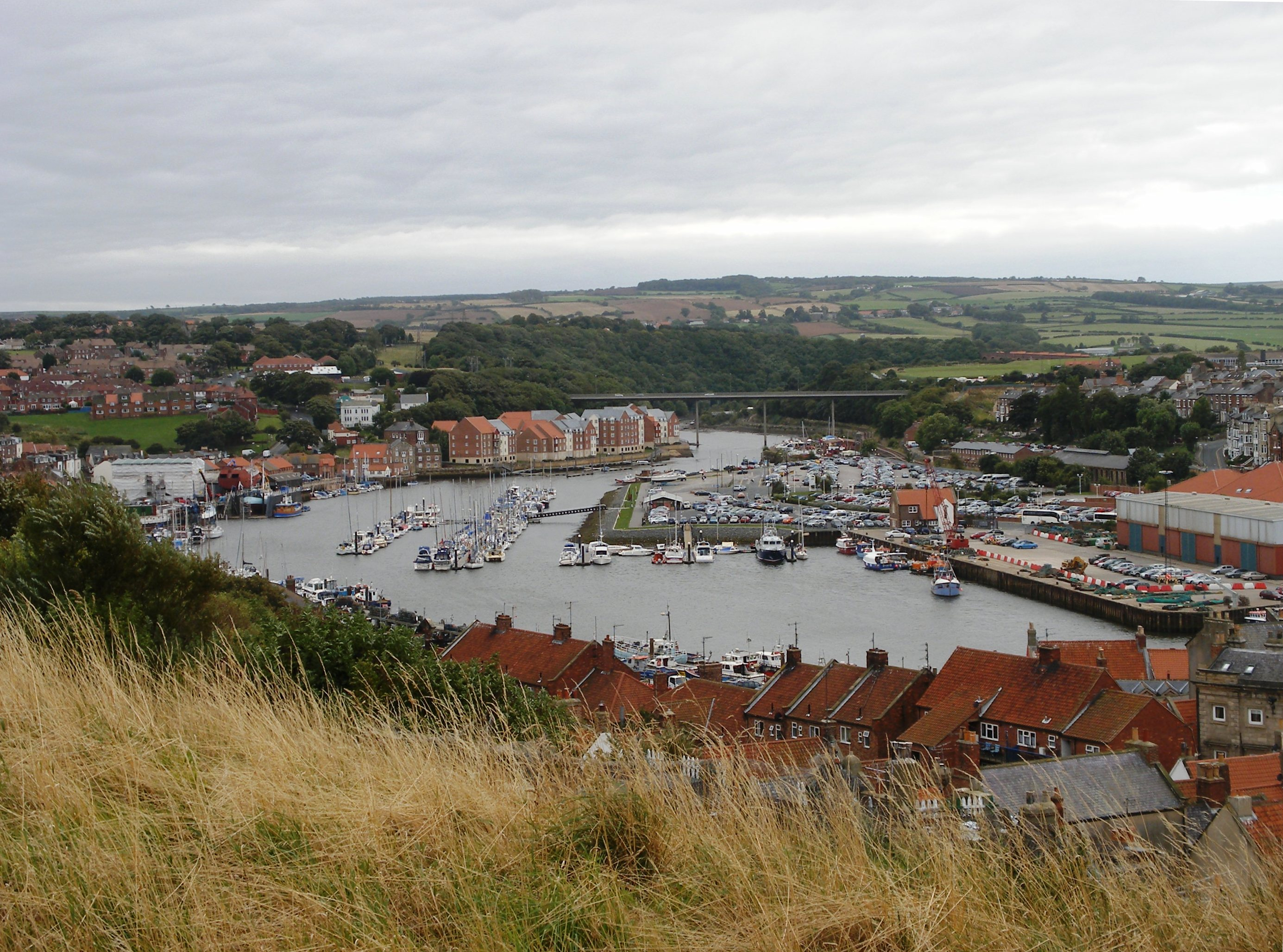
The Marina was built to develop and diversify the local economy.

The Whitby Marina project, jointly funded by Scarborough Borough Council, Yorkshire Forward and the European Regional Development Fund, was developed to diversify the local economy. The remaining shipbuilding firm, Parkol Marine, is a family-run business on the east side of the river. Founded in 1988, the boatyard has two berths for new build and a dry dock for repairs. St Hilda's Business Centre provides office space for a range of businesses. Whitby Business Park is a 49-acre (20 ha) site located by the A171 road, 2 miles (3 km) from the harbour on the southern outskirts of the town. Companies on the park include Supreme Plastics, Whitby Seafoods Ltd and Botham's of Whitby alongside major retailers, Homebase and Sainsbury's.

The east coast has limited conventional energy generation capacity, but Whitby is the closest port to a proposed development on Dogger Bank, ideally placed to provide the offshore wind power industry with support vessel operations and logistics. The Dogger Bank wind farm could include up to 2,600 giant 400-foot (120 m) turbines covering more than 3,300 square miles (850,000 ha).

== Transport ==
=== Port ===
River Esk in Whitby

Whitby's port is used for shipping to Europe, especially Scandinavia, and mainly handles grain, steel products, timber and potash. Vessels limited to 3,000 tonnes deadweight tonnage can dock at the wharf, which is able to load or unload two ships simultaneously. As of 2004, 54,000 square feet (5,000 m^{2}) of dock space is used to store all-weather cargo, with a 17,000-square-foot (1,600 m^{2}) warehouse.

=== Rail ===
Whitby railway station

Whitby station is the terminus of the Esk Valley Line, operated by Northern. As of the May 2021 timetable change, the station is served by six trains per day (four on Sunday) to and from Middlesbrough, with most trains running from or continuing to Newcastle. Travel by train to York, or points south of there, is only possible by a circuitous route with several changes. A probably faster and cheaper alternative is to use the bus to or from the railway stations in Scarborough or York (see below).

Whitby was formerly the northern terminus of the Whitby, Pickering and York Line. In 2007, the North Yorkshire Moors Railway began a summer service on that line between Pickering and Whitby operated by steam locomotives, as an extension of their long-standing Pickering-Grosmont service.

=== Road ===
Whitby is situated on the A171 road from Scarborough to Guisborough, which originally passed over the swing bridge. A high level bridge over the Esk Valley was built in 1980 to avoid the bridge and ease congestion in the town centre. The A174 accesses coastal towns to the north and the A169 crosses the North Yorkshire Moors to Pickering.

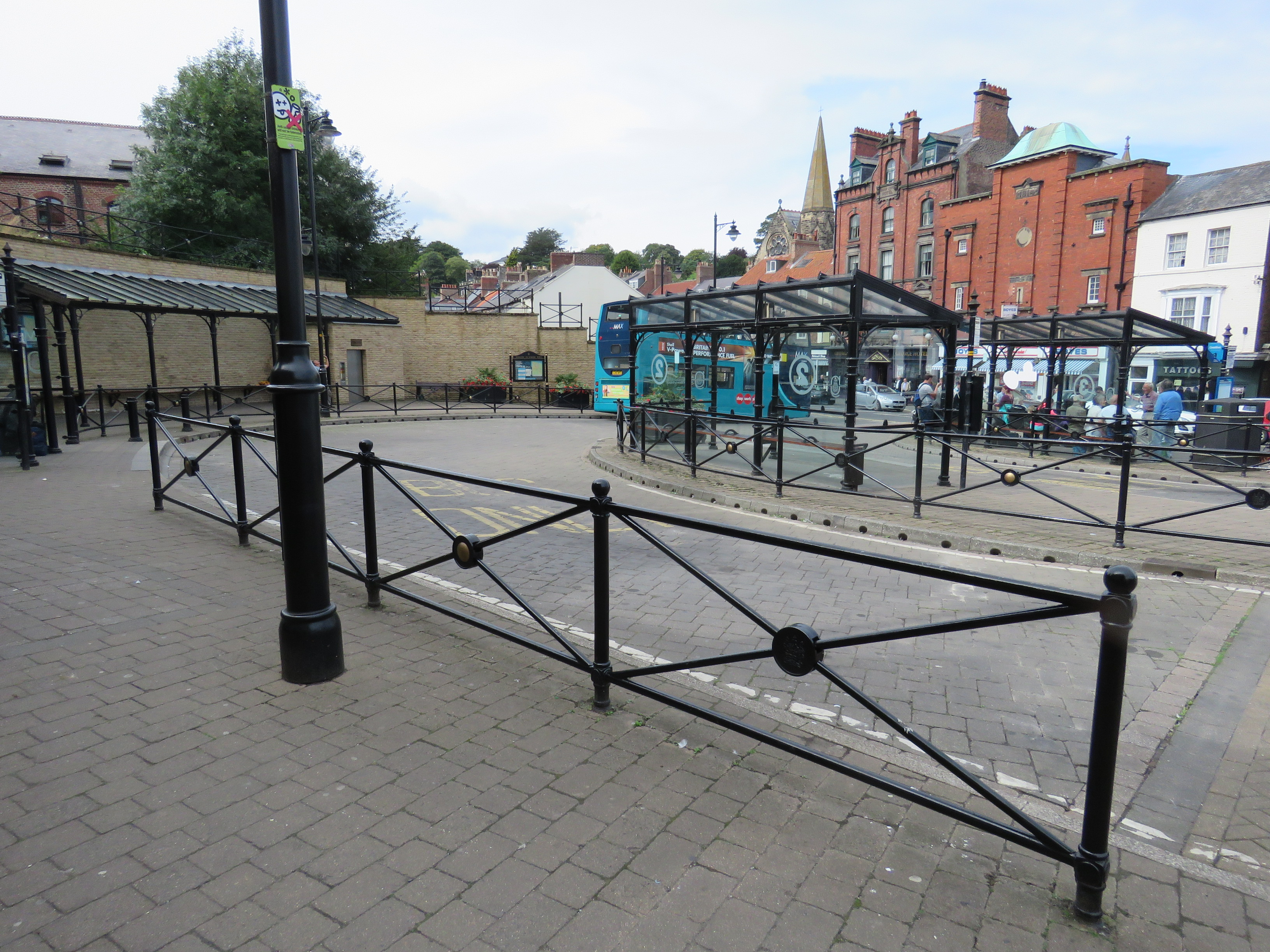
Whitby Bus Station

Whitby is on the Yorkshire Coastliner bus route from Leeds, York, Malton and Pickering, which operates several times a day. Arriva North East runs hourly bus services connecting Whitby to Scarborough and Middlesbrough. The Coastliner services serves York railway station, whilst the Arriva X93 terminates at Scarborough railway station, both providing an alternative route south compared with the circuitous rail service from Whitby.

=== Walking ===
The coastal section of the 110-mile (180 km) Cleveland Way National Trail passes through Whitby.

== Public services ==
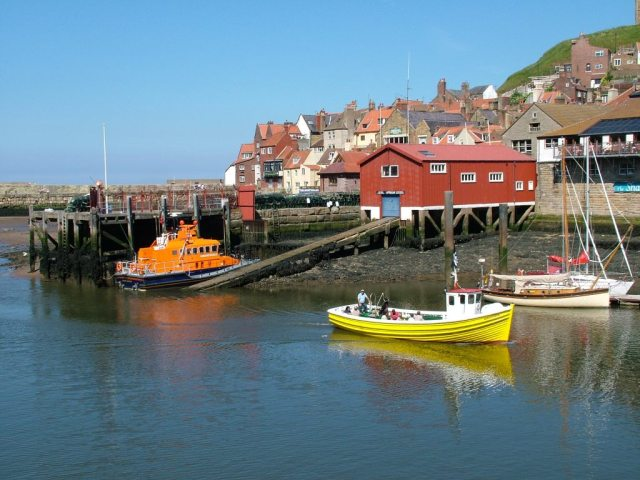
Whitby Lifeboat Station before it was replaced in 2007

Whitby Community Hospital was formerly run by the Scarborough and North East Yorkshire Health Care NHS Trust, and more recently by the Humber Teaching NHS Foundation Trust. In February 2018 it was decided to redevelop the hospital site at a cost of £12 million into a "health and wellbeing hub" with an urgent care centre and 19 inpatient beds.

Five general practitioners and five dentists serve the Whitby area.

Yorkshire Ambulance Service provides transport throughout Yorkshire.

Whitby fire station is manned by North Yorkshire Fire and Rescue Service between 8 am and 6 pm.

The town's two police stations are provided by North Yorkshire Police Authority.

lifeboat station built in 2007, on the east bank, is operated by the Royal National Lifeboat Institution. Crew members are unpaid volunteers and the station has two lifeboats, an inshore D class lifeboat the Warter Priory which was donated to the station in 2017, and an all-weather Shannon-class lifeboat, the Lois Ivan, launched in 2023.

North Yorkshire County Council waste management services operate a household waste recycling centre at Whitby Industrial Estate, and a weekly collection alternating between recyclables and landfill waste.

Mains water supply, predominantly from the River Esk, is treated at Ruswarp Water Treatment Works by Yorkshire Water who also deal with the town's sewerage.

CE Electric UK is responsible for delivering electricity and Northern Gas Networks supply piped gas.

== Education ==
Whitby has a three-tier school system, primary, middle (11–14) and Caedmon College (11–19), the latter formed in 2014 from the merger of Caedmon School (11–14) and Whitby Community College (14–19). Eskdale School continues to operate as a middle school, but is currently consulting on raising its age range to 16. In February 2018 Caedmon College and Eskdale School agreed to federate and plan to provide a joint sixth form in the town.

The primary schools are St Hilda's Roman Catholic Primary School, Stakesby Community Primary School, West Cliff Primary School, Airy Hill Community Primary School and East Whitby Community Primary School. North Yorkshire County Council provides education services.

The Whitby and District Fishing Industry Training School offers training for new entrants to the fishing industry, and experienced fishermen.

== Landmarks ==
Whitby Bridge, spanning the River Esk, opens to allow shipping access to the upper harbour.

The swing bridge spanning the Esk divides the upper and lower harbours and joins the east and west sides of the town. Whitby developed as an important bridging point of the River Esk and in 1351 permission was granted for tolls to be taken on the bridge for its maintenance. In 1609 a survey for a new bridge was commissioned while in 1628 it was described as a drawbridge where men raised planks to let vessels pass and tolls were collected. The bridge posts were rebuilt in stone at a cost of £3,000 in 1766. This structure was replaced by a four-arched bridge between 1833 and 1835, one arch made of cast iron swivelled to allow vessels to pass. This bridge was replaced between 1908 and 1909 by the current electric swing bridge.

The bridge allowed the town to spread onto the west bank, whilst the east bank, the Haggerlythe, is dominated by St Mary's Church and the ruins of Whitby Abbey which is owned by English Heritage. St Mary's Church is a grade I listed building on the site of a Saxon church. The church's ancient foundation dates from the 12th century. Over time it has been extensively altered and enlarged but retains several features including box pews. The East Cliff is quite a distance by road from the church, the alternative is to climb the 199 steps of the "Church Stairs" or use the footpath called "Caedmon's Trod". The stone stairs, which replaced the original wooden steps, were built about 200 years ago and renovated between 2005 and 2006. There are landings originally assisting coffin bearers on their journey to the graveyard on the cliff top.

The harbour is sheltered by the grade II listed east and west piers each with a lighthouse and beacon. The west lighthouse, of 1831, is the taller at 84 feet (25.5 m) and the east lighthouse, built in 1855, is 54 feet (16.5 m) high. On the west pier extension is a foghorn that sounds a blast every 30 seconds during fog. New lights were fitted to both the lighthouse towers and the beacons in 2011. Whitby Lighthouse, operated by Trinity House, is south-east of the town on Ling Hill.

On the West Cliff is a statue of Captain James Cook who served his apprenticeship in the town, and a whale bone arch, commemorates the whaling industry. It is the second such arch, the original is preserved in Whitby Archives Heritage Centre. By the inner harbour is a statue commemorating William Scoresby Sr. (father of William Scoresby Jr.), designer of the crow's nest.

On the outskirts of town to the west is the 19th-century Sneaton Castle built by James Wilson who sold his sugar plantation where he had over 200 slaves and moved to Whitby. Alongside it is St Hilda's Priory, the mother house of the Order of the Holy Paraclete. The castle was used as a school and is now a conference centre and hotel in association with the priory.

== Culture and media ==
Frank Meadow Sutcliffe left a photographic record of the town, harbour, fishing and residents in late-Victorian times. His most famous photograph entitled "Water Rats" was taken in 1886. He became famous internationally as a great exponent of pictorial photography. He exhibited his work in Tokyo, Vienna, France, the US and Great Britain winning over 60 gold, silver and bronze medals. He retired in 1922 and became curator of Whitby Museum. The Royal Photographic Society made him an honorary member in 1935. Sutcliffe's photograph archive and collection are now at Whitby Museum.

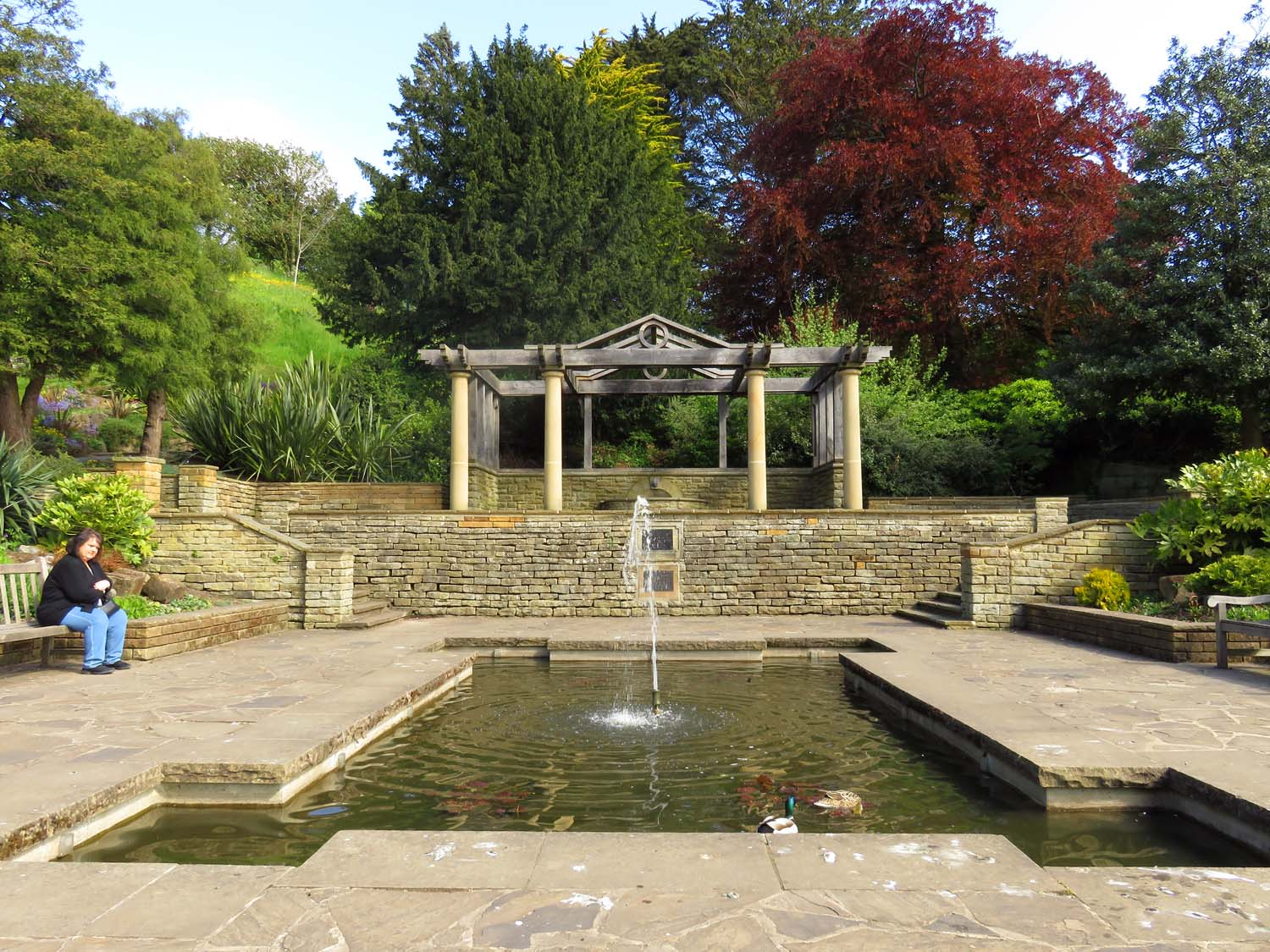
Pannett Park

Pannett Park was built on land purchased by a local philanthropist and politician Alderman Robert Pannett in 1902. After his death in 1928, the trust he set up created a public park and art gallery. In 1931 Whitby Museum was built behind the gallery by the Whitby Literary and Philosophical Society. It holds a collection of the archaeological and social history of jet and has on display a "Hand of Glory". The Friends of Pannett Park, formed in 2005, successfully bid for a Heritage Lottery Fund grant to refurbish the park.

There has been a lifeboat in Whitby since 1802 and the old boathouse, built in 1895 and used until 1957, is a museum displaying the Robert and Ellen Robson lifeboat, built in 1919.

The ancient Penny Hedge ceremony is performed on the eve of Ascension Day commemorating a penance imposed by the abbot on miscreant hunters in the Middle Ages. The hunters using a knife costing a penny had to cut wood in Eskdaleside and take it to Whitby harbour where it was made into a hedge that would survive three tides. This tradition is carried out annually on the east side of the upper harbour.

The Whitby Gazette was founded in 1854 by Ralph Horne, a local printer. The first issues were records of visitors and lodgings rather than a newspaper. The publication became a weekly newspaper in 1858, with a short spell of being published twice weekly between 2000 and 2012. The local radio stations are BBC Radio Tees, This is The Coast and Coast & County Radio.

The Pavilion Theatre built in the 1870s in West Cliff hosts a range of events during the summer months. For over four decades the town has hosted the Whitby Folk Week, and since 1993 the bi-annual Whitby Goth Weekend for members of the Goth subculture. "Whitby Now" is an annual live music event featuring local bands in the Pavilion which has taken place since 1991. Since 2008, the Bram Stoker Film Festival has taken place in October.

=== Literature ===
The town has a strong literary tradition; it can even be said that the earliest English literature comes from Whitby as Cædmon, the first known Anglo Saxon poet was a monk at the order that used Whitby Abbey during the abbacy of St Hilda (657–680). Part of Bram Stoker's novel Dracula was set in Whitby, incorporating pieces of local folklore, including the beaching of the Russian ship Dmitry. Stoker discovered the name "Dracula" at the old public library. One scholar has suggested that Stoker chose Whitby as the site of Dracula's first appearance in England because of the Synod of Whitby, given the novel's preoccupation with timekeeping and calendar disputes. Elizabeth Gaskell set her novel Sylvia's Lovers partly in the town which she visited in 1859 and Lewis Carroll stayed at 5, East Terrace between July and September 1854: his first publications may have been published in the Whitby Gazette.

Charles Dickens is known to have visited Whitby, and in a letter of 1861 to his friend Wilkie Collins, who was at the time in Whitby, Dickens says:

In my time that curious railroad by the Whitby Moor was so much the more curious, that you were balanced against a counter-weight of water, and that you did it like Blondin. But in these remote days the one inn of Whitby was up a back-yard, and oyster-shell grottoes were the only view from the best private room.

Wilkie Collins stayed in Whitby to work on his novel, No Name. He was accompanied by Caroline Graves, the inspiration for The Woman in White. Mary Linskill was born in a small house at Blackburn's Yard in 1840. She reached a wide readership when her second novel, Between the Heather and the Northern Sea, was published in 1884. Her last novel For Pity's Sake, was published posthumously in 1891. James Russell Lowell, the American writer, visited Whitby while ambassador in London 1880–85, staying at 3 Wellington Terrace, West Cliff. On his last visit in 1889, he wrote:

This is my ninth year at Whitby and the place loses none of its charm for me.

G. P. Taylor, a former Church of England curate in Whitby, is now a celebrated author. His best-selling book Shadowmancer was set in Whitby. Theresa Tomlinson, a writer of historical and other fiction for children and young adults, lives in the town.

The novel Possession: A Romance by A. S. Byatt, set in the town, was adapted into a 2002 feature film called Possession starring Gwyneth Paltrow.

In the British Television drama series Heartbeat (1992–2010), set in the 1960s Yorkshire, the plot frequently takes place in Whitby over the seasons.

A crime novel series by James Whitworth is set in Whitby. The first two novels are Death's Disciple and The Eve of Murder. These were followed by Bidding to Die, Better the Devil You Know and Murder on the Record.

A trilogy of young adult novels, The Whitby Witches, makes much of the town's setting and history, embellishing local traditions whilst incorporating them into the narrative. The author, Robin Jarvis, recalls "The first time I visited Whitby, I stepped off the train and knew I was somewhere very special. It was a grey, drizzling day but that only added to the haunting beauty and lonely atmosphere of the place. Listening to Carmina Burana on my headphones, I explored the ruined abbey on the clifftop. The place was a fantastic inspiration. In The Whitby Witches I have interwoven many of the existing local legends, such as the frightening Barguest, whilst inventing a few of my own, most notably the aufwaders." Jarvis returned to Whitby for his 2016 novel, The Power of Dark, the first in The Witching Legacy series.

Other literary works making reference to Whitby include:

- Caedmon's Song by Peter Robinson
- The Hundred and Ninety-Nine Steps by Michel Faber
- The Resurrectionists by Kim Wilkins
- The Brenda & Effie Mysteries series by Paul Magrs (consisting of Never the Bride, Something Borrowed, Conjugal Rites, Hell's Belles).
- Death at the Seaside by Frances Brody

== Sport ==
Wind surfing, sailing and surfing take place off the beaches between Whitby and Sandsend and the area is visited by divers. Whitby's other sports facilities including cricket and football pitches, and tennis courts.

Whitby Regatta takes place annually over three days in August. The highlight is a rowing competition between Whitby Friendship, Whitby Fishermen's, and Scarborough amateur rowing clubs.

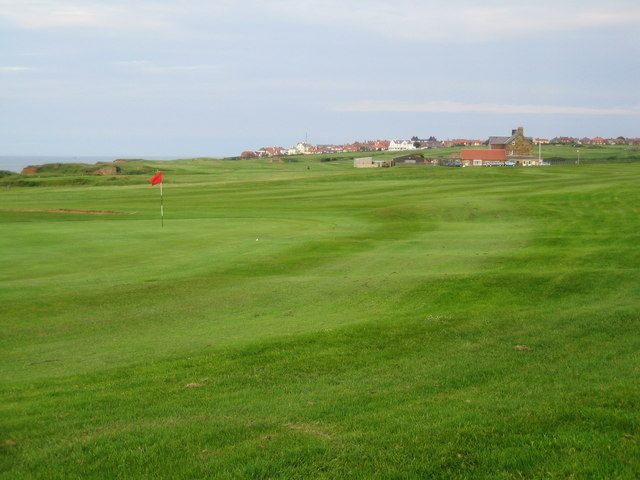
Whitby Golf Club

Whitby Golf Club formed in 1891 and has been at its 18-hole course on cliff tops to the northwest of the town since 1895.

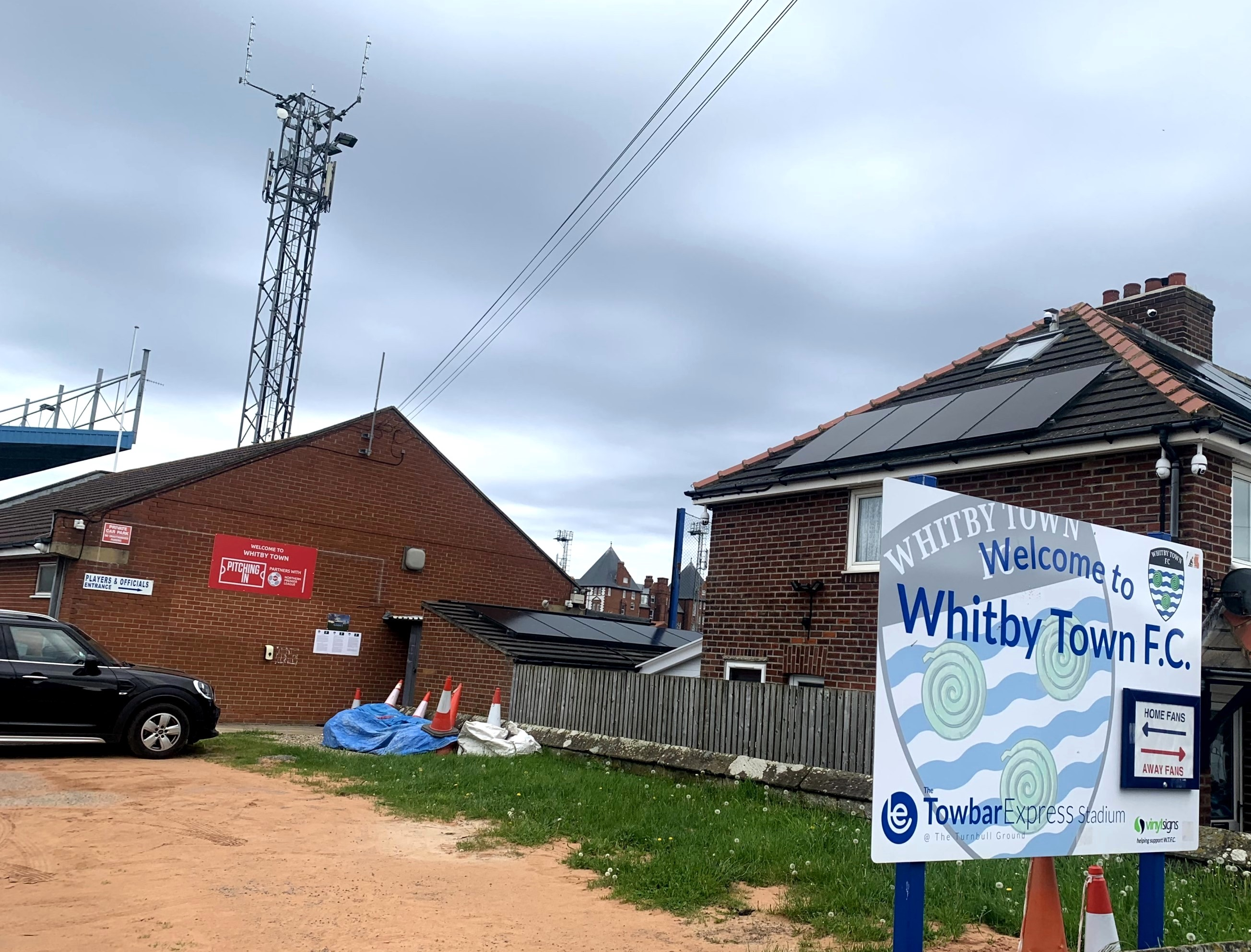
Entrance to Whitby Town F.C. ground

Whitby Town F.C., formed in 1892, is a semi-professional football club which plays in the Northern Premier League at its 3,200 capacity Turnbull Ground on Upgang Lane.

Whitby Cricket Club has been in existence since the 1920s and plays from the Turnbull Ground on West Cliff. Two senior Saturday teams compete in the North Yorkshire & South Durham Cricket League, and a junior section in the Derwent Valley Junior Cricket League.

== Climate ==
The area generally has warm summers and relatively mild winters. Weather conditions vary from day to day as well as from season to season. Its latitude means that it is influenced by predominantly westerly winds with depressions and their associated fronts, bringing unsettled and windy weather particularly in winter. Between depressions there are often small mobile anticyclones that bring periods of fine weather. In winter anticyclones bring cold dry weather. In summer the anticyclones tend to bring dry settled conditions which can lead to drought. The two dominant influences on the climate of the Whitby area are shelter against the worst of the moist westerly winds provided by the North York Moors and the proximity of the North Sea. Late, chilly springs and warm summers are a feature of the area but there are often spells of fine autumn weather. Onshore winds in spring and early summer bring mists or low stratus clouds (known locally as sea frets) to the coast and moors.

Climate data for Whitby Climate ID: 2289; coordinates: 54°28′51″N 0°37′33″W; elevation: 41 m (135 ft); 1991–2020 normals, extremes 1961–present
Month	Jan	Feb	Mar	Apr	May	Jun	Jul	Aug	Sep	Oct	Nov	Dec	Year
Record high °C (°F)	14.8 (58.6)	19.6 (67.3)	20.1 (68.2)	25.0 (77.0)	29.8 (85.6)	30.9 (87.6)	37.9 (100.2)	33.1 (91.6)	28.2 (82.8)	28.0 (82.4)	17.8 (64.0)	16.2 (61.2)	37.9 (100.2)
Mean daily maximum °C (°F)	7.3 (45.1)	7.9 (46.2)	9.8 (49.6)	12.0 (53.6)	14.7 (58.5)	17.6 (63.7)	19.9 (67.8)	19.7 (67.5)	17.3 (63.1)	13.8 (56.8)	10.1 (50.2)	7.7 (45.9)	13.1 (55.6)
Daily mean °C (°F)	4.7 (40.5)	5.1 (41.2)	6.5 (43.7)	8.4 (47.1)	11.0 (51.8)	13.8 (56.8)	16.1 (61.0)	16.0 (60.8)	13.8 (56.8)	10.7 (51.3)	7.4 (45.3)	5.1 (41.2)	9.9 (49.8)
Mean daily minimum °C (°F)	2.2 (36.0)	2.3 (36.1)	3.2 (37.8)	4.8 (40.6)	7.3 (45.1)	10.1 (50.2)	12.2 (54.0)	12.2 (54.0)	10.3 (50.5)	7.7 (45.9)	4.7 (40.5)	2.4 (36.3)	6.6 (43.9)
Record low °C (°F)	−11.8 (10.8)	−10.5 (13.1)	−12.5 (9.5)	−7.0 (19.4)	−2.3 (27.9)	0.3 (32.5)	1.9 (35.4)	3.0 (37.4)	0.5 (32.9)	−3.0 (26.6)	−8.7 (16.3)	−19.6 (−3.3)	−19.6 (−3.3)
Average precipitation mm (inches)	57.5 (2.26)	46.4 (1.83)	39.2 (1.54)	44.4 (1.75)	38.8 (1.53)	57.6 (2.27)	49.1 (1.93)	61.3 (2.41)	53.3 (2.10)	58.9 (2.32)	71.0 (2.80)	66.7 (2.63)	644.1 (25.36)
Mean monthly sunshine hours	60.9	87.7	129.8	167.5	211.4	194.0	202.5	188.2	145.7	108.2	70.3	55.7	1,622
Source 1: Met Office (Note: Data was calculated from Met Office raw monthly long term data from 1991–2020.)
Source 2: Starlings Roost Weather

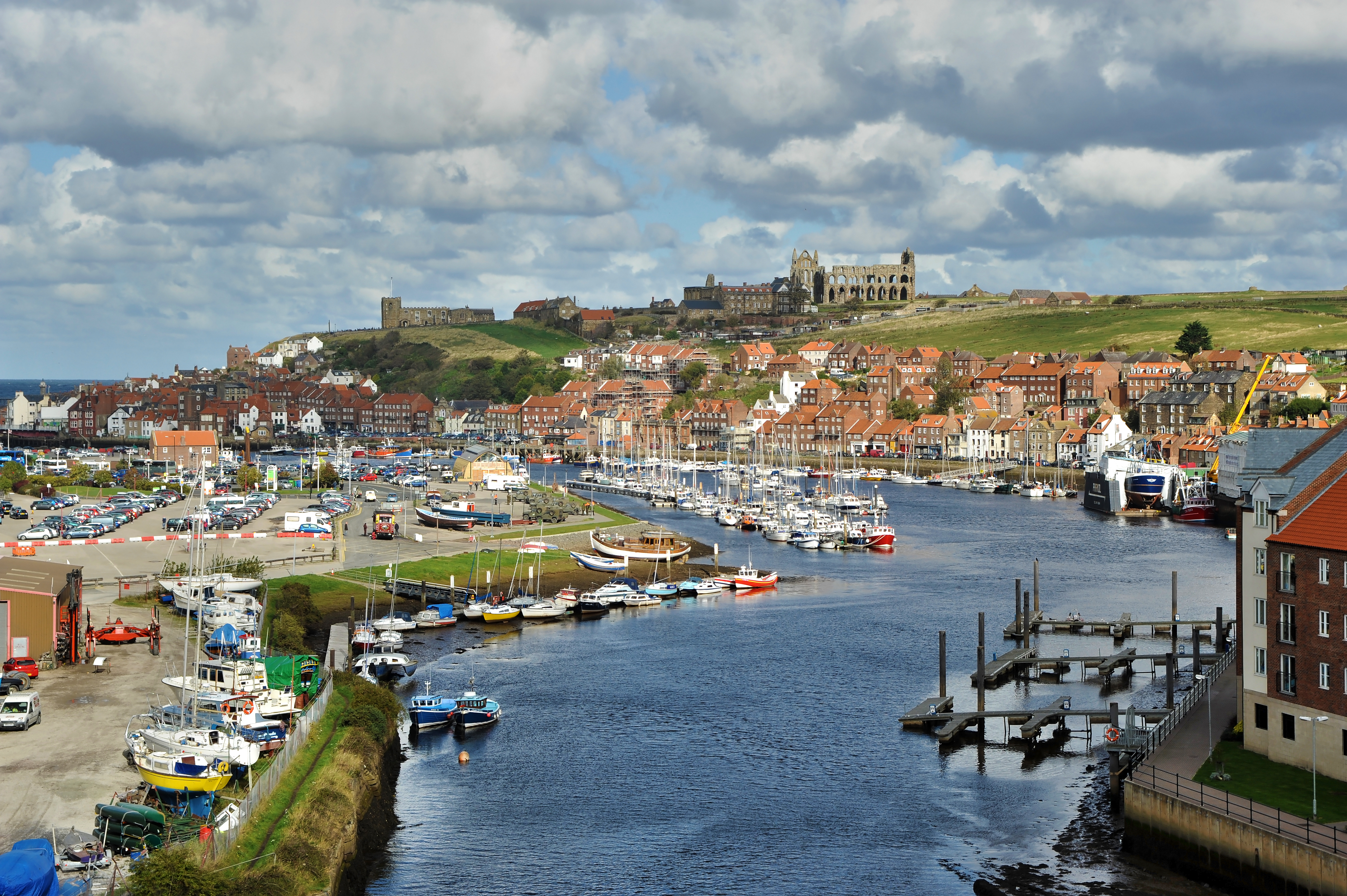
Whitby seen from A171

On 5 January 2016 the town was seriously affected by flash floods. North Yorkshire Police cautioned motorists to drive with "extreme caution" and advised that the area be avoided "unless absolutely necessary".

== Demography ==
According to the 2011 UK census, Whitby parish had a population of 13,213 living in 6,097 households. In the 2001 UK census of the total number of 5,973 homes 2,034 were rented and 3,939 were owner occupied. Of the 5,506 economically active persons aged between 16 and 74, 420 were unemployed. The number of people working in the service industry was 4,113. Approximately 2,500 people were aged under 16, 8,400 were aged 16–64, and 2,700 aged 65 and over. The mean age of the population was 41.78 years. The number of people who travel to work by motorised transport is 3,134 but 2,190 households have no cars or vans.

=== Population change ===
Population growth in Whitby from 1801 to 2021
Year	1801	1811	1821	1831	1841	1851	1861	1871	1881	1891	1901	1911	1921	1931	1939 (Note: There was no United Kingdom census in 1941.)	1951	1961	1971	1981	1991	2001	2011	2021
Whitby CP							8,125	7,886	8,820	7,501	6,349	5,879	5,811										
Ruswarp CP							3,141	4,236	4,839	5,097	5,019	4,831	6, 195										
Helredale CP											387	411	504										
Hawsker CP (part)							590	665	741	816	79	79	79										
Population	10,974	10,275	12,584	11,725	11,682	12,875	11,856	12,787	14,400	13,414	11,834	11,218	12,589	11,451	12,698	11,674	11,675	12,327	12,980	13,632	13,594	13,213	13,129
Whitby CP/AP

Note: Between 1801 and 1925 Whitby comprised Whitby, Ruswarp and part of Hawsker civil parishes and (between 1894 and 1925) Helredale civil parish, all of which were merged on 1 April 1925 into the current Whitby area.

== Notable people ==
- Samuel Barnett (1980–), actor
- William Bateson (1861–1926), geneticist, was born in Whitby
- Arthur Brown (1942–), musician best known for being the frontman of The Crazy World of Arthur Brown
- William Clarkson (1859–1934), co-founder of the Royal Australian Navy
- Hilda of Whitby (c. 614 – 680), a saint of the early Church in Britain
- Adam Lyth (1987–), cricketer who was selected as England's opener for the 2015 Ashes series
- Beth Mead (1995–), footballer for England who was born in the town
- David Mills (footballer) (1951–), former footballer who now works as a scout
- Mark Richardson (1970–), drummer grew up in Whitby

== Twin towns ==
Whitby's twin towns include several visited by Captain Cook in ships built in the town.

- Anchorage, Alaska, United States
- Porirua, New Zealand
- Stanley, Falkland Islands
- Whitby, Canada
- Nukuʻalofa, Tonga
- Kauaʻi County, Hawaii
- Osterode, Germany

== See also ==
- Port of Whitby
- Ship and boat building in Whitby
- Whitby Rural District
- Whitby (central area - east)
- Whitby (central area - west)
- Whitby (outer areas)
