= William Johnston (Lord Provost) =

Scottish engraver, mapmaker and local politician

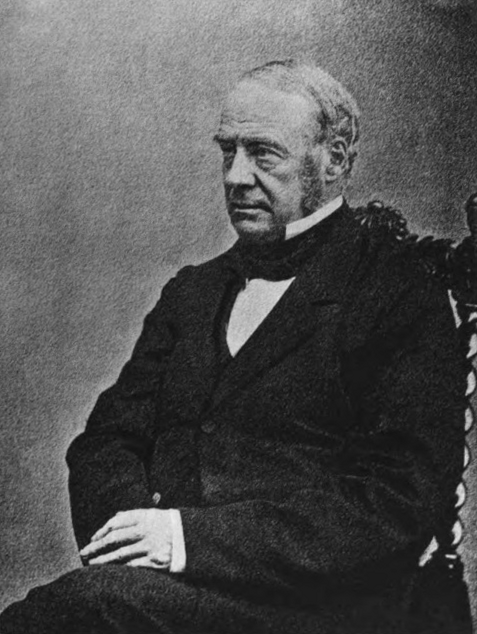
Sir William Johnston, Lord Provost of Edinburgh

Sir William Johnston of Kirkhill (1802–1888) was a Scottish engraver, mapmaker and local politician who served as Lord Provost of Edinburgh from 1848 to 1851.

== Life ==
He was the third son of Andrew Johnston, by Isabel, daughter of Archibald Keith of Newbattle, born at Kirkhill, Midlothian (now part of Penicuik), on 27 October 1802; Alexander Keith Johnston was his brother. He was educated at Edinburgh high school and after serving terms of apprenticeship, with the Edinburgh engravers, Kirkwood & Sons and William Hume Lizars, began business on his own account as an engraver on 1 December 1825. The following year he founded with his brother Alexander, the publishing firm of W. & A. K. Johnston. On 2 December 1837 he was appointed engraver and copperplate printer to Queen Victoria.

Johnston was elected a burgess on 28 July 1828, and on 21 August following was sworn high constable of Edinburgh. He was elected on 14 May 1830 secretary, and on 21 March 1831 moderator to the high constables for the remainder of the term of office of his predecessor, who had resigned by way of protest against a declaration in favour of political reform issued by the high constables. On 4 April he was elected moderator for the year. In October 1831 he was appointed a member of the dean of guild court, and on 26 September 1832 was sworn of the Edinburgh town council. On 11 April 1839 Johnston was admitted a guild brother of the city of Edinburgh, and that year served again as moderator to the high constables. On 10 November 1840 he was elected a bailie of Edinburgh. During the economic distress of 1842 he presided over the Edinburgh committee of relief, and it was his suggestion that led to public works "The Meadows" and "The Queen's Drive" round Arthur's Seat.

From 1848 to 1851 Johnston served as Lord Provost of Edinburgh, and on 26 August 1851 he was knighted by the queen in Holyrood Palace. In 1852 he was elected a fellow of the Scottish Society of Antiquaries. In 1859 he was taken to court by David Dobbie, as Chairman of the Edinburgh and Glasgow Bank, for statements he had made before its collapse and takeover by the Clydesdale Bank.

In 1867 he retired from business to an estate at Kirkhill near Gorebridge, Midlothian, which he had purchased in 1848, and where he died on 7 February 1888. He was buried on 10 February in the Grange Cemetery, Edinburgh.

== Family ==
Johnston married twice; first, on 13 March 1829, Margaret, daughter of James Pearson of Fala, Midlothian, who died on 13 June 1865; and secondly, on 23 October 1868, Georgiana Augusta Wilkinson, youngest daughter of William Ker of Gateshaw, Roxburghshire, widow of William Scoresby. His only child, by his first wife, was Elizabeth Whyte, born in 1830, who married Robert Edmund Scoresby Jackson, and died in 1879.
