= Whitby Swing Bridge =

Bridge in North Yorkshire, England

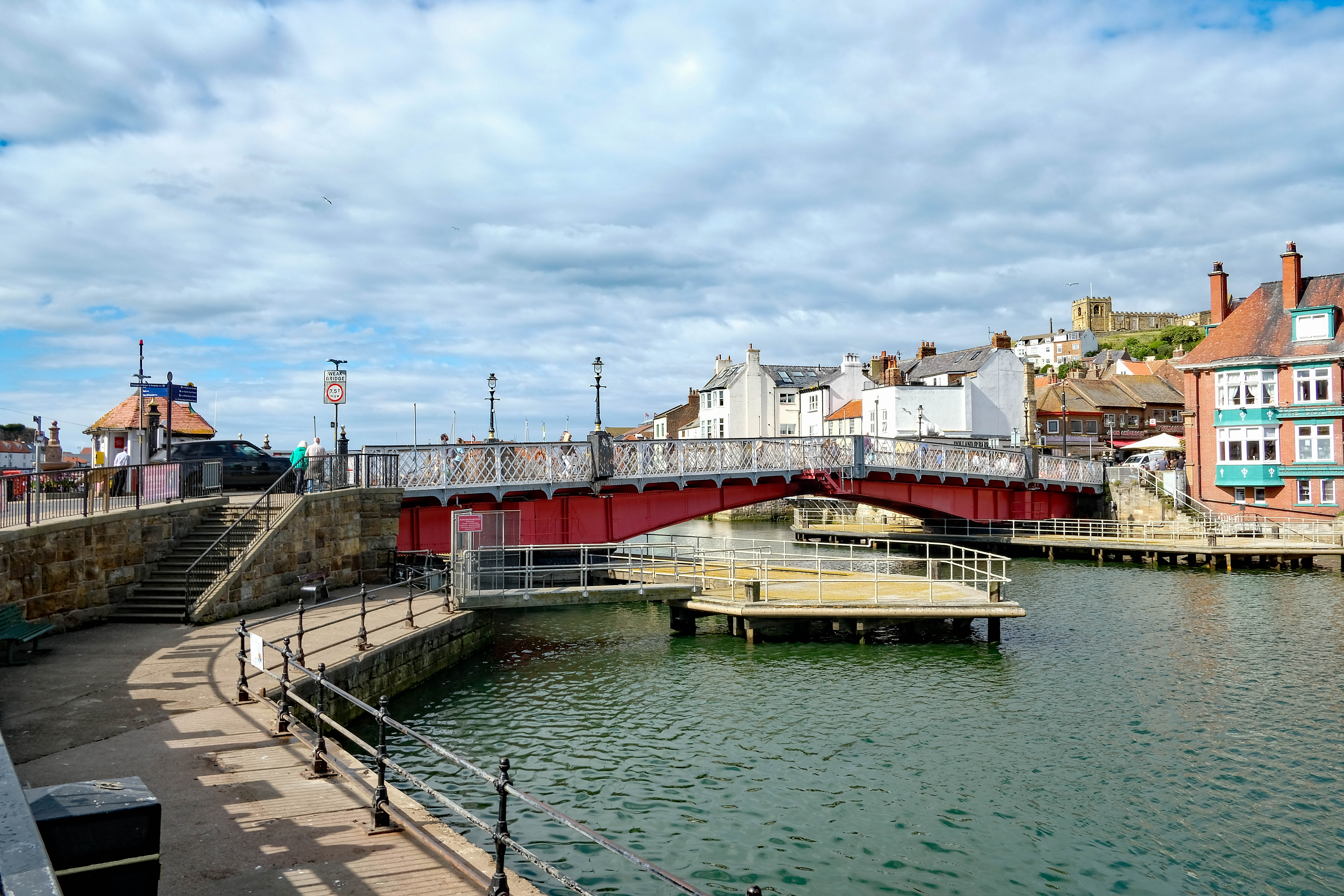
- Whitby Swing Bridge
- Coordinates: 54.486914°N 0.612701°W
- Crosses: River Esk, North Yorkshire

Characteristics
- Design: Swing bridge
- Longest span: 75 ft
- Load limit: 7.5 tons

History
- Designer: J Mitchell Moncrieff
- Engineering design by: Heenan & Froude
- Construction start: 1908
- Construction cost: £22,582 (equivalent to £2,324,005 as of 2025),
- Opened: 1909

Location
- Interactive map of Whitby Swing Bridge

Whitby Swing Bridge is a pedestrian and road bridge over the River Esk in Whitby, North Yorkshire, England.

== History ==
The River Esk has been crossed by bridges at this location for centuries. A grant made by King Edward III in 1351 allowed the collection of pontage tolls for the maintenance of a bridge. By the mid 1550s the tolls averaged around £6 per annum (equivalent to £2,765 as of 2025).

In 1629 an agreement was made by the justices in the North Riding to replace a wooden bridge with one which included moving parts. This was later replaced by a drawbridge, built in 1766 at a cost of £3,000 (equivalent to £451,000 in 2025), and later in 1835, the first swing bridge was opened designed by Francis Pickernell.

== Current bridge ==
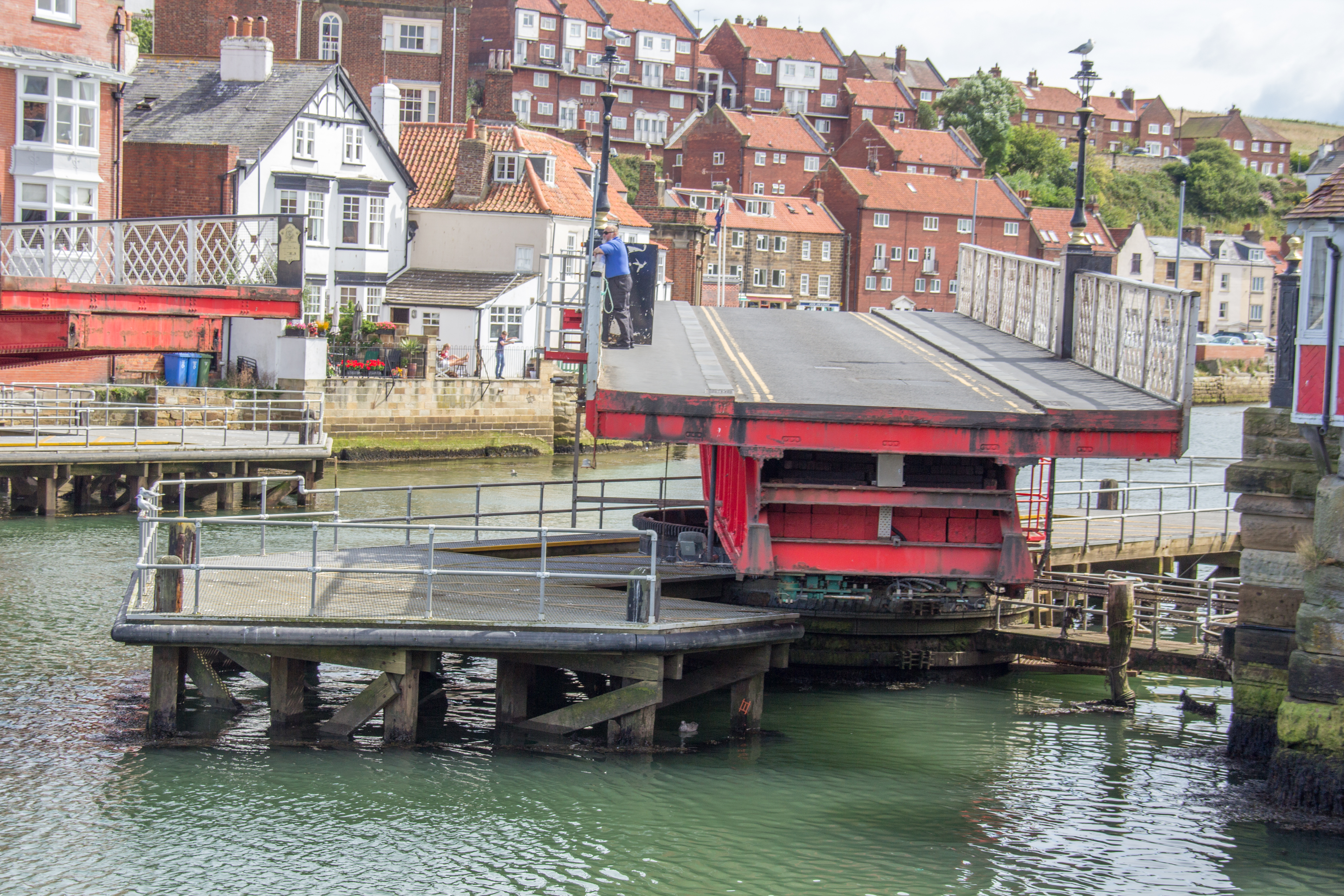
Bridge during an opening

By the early 20th century the limited 45-foot (14 m) clearance of the 1835 bridge was restricting the size of vessels which could be built upstream of the bridge. A replacement swing bridge was commissioned by Whitby Urban District Council. It was designed by J. Mitchell Moncrieff, later President of the Institution of Structural Engineers. As work progressed on the west side of the river bank to set a pivot for the bridge to swing, a seam of coal 10 inches (250 mm) thick was struck at 26 feet (7.9 m) below the water level. The foundations had to be sunk to a depth of 32 feet (9.8 m) below the low water mark for a secure foundation.

It was opened in July 1909 by Mabel Theresa Duncombe, the daughter of the Viscount of Helmsley and the wife of local MP, Sir Gervase Beckett. The bridge consists of two leaves moved independently by electric motors.

The bridge originally carried the A171 road. To avoid congestion in the town centre, the road was diverted to a high level bridge over the Esk Valley built in 1980.

The bridge is not wide enough for vehicles to pass, so vehicular access to the bridge is controlled by traffic lights. The bridge is opened to shipping either side of high tide, but is quickly closed again to allow for traffic movement.

Until 2011 the bridge had a weight limit of 17 tonnes (17 long tons; 19 short tons). This was reduced to 7.5 tonnes (8.3 tons) in 2011 by North Yorkshire County Council.

In 2023 it was announced that the local council would be closing the bridge to traffic, with the exception of buses, during peak times in spring and summer. This was said to be to "address safety concerns around overcrowding".

Next bridge upstream	Esk	Next bridge downstream
A171 road bridge	Whitby Swing Bridge	none

== See also ==
- List of crossings of the River Esk, North Yorkshire
