= Eskdale School =

School in North Yorkshire, England

Coordinates: 54°28′16.5″N 0°36′17.2″W

Location
- Stainsacre Lane; Whitby; North Yorkshire, YO22 4HS; England

Information
- Type: Community school
- Closed: 19 July 2024
- Local authority: North Yorkshire Council
- Department for Education URN: 121668 Tables
- Ofsted: Reports
- Last Executive Head: Brian Crosby
- Last Head of School: Phil Nicholson
- Gender: Coeducational
- Age: 11 to 16
- Website: http://eskdale-school.co.uk/

Eskdale School was a coeducational secondary school located in Whitby, North Yorkshire, England. The school is named after Eskdale, a valley that runs from Westerdale to Whitby.

It was a community school administered by North Yorkshire Council. From September 2017 it became an 11 to 16 school. This has increased the capacity of the school from September 2018.

In February 2019 Eskdale School agreed to federate with nearby Caedmon College.

The school also had an astroturf pitch which is still used by the local community.

In January 2023 plans were suggested – to close the school, and amalgamate with nearby Caedmon College. This moved forward in summer 2023 after consultation – and was decided from September 2024 the school would close and is set to become Whitby School and Sixth Form (with Caedmon College).

Eskdale closed on Friday 19 July 2024.
