= Whale Bone Arch =

Archway in Whitby, North Yorkshire

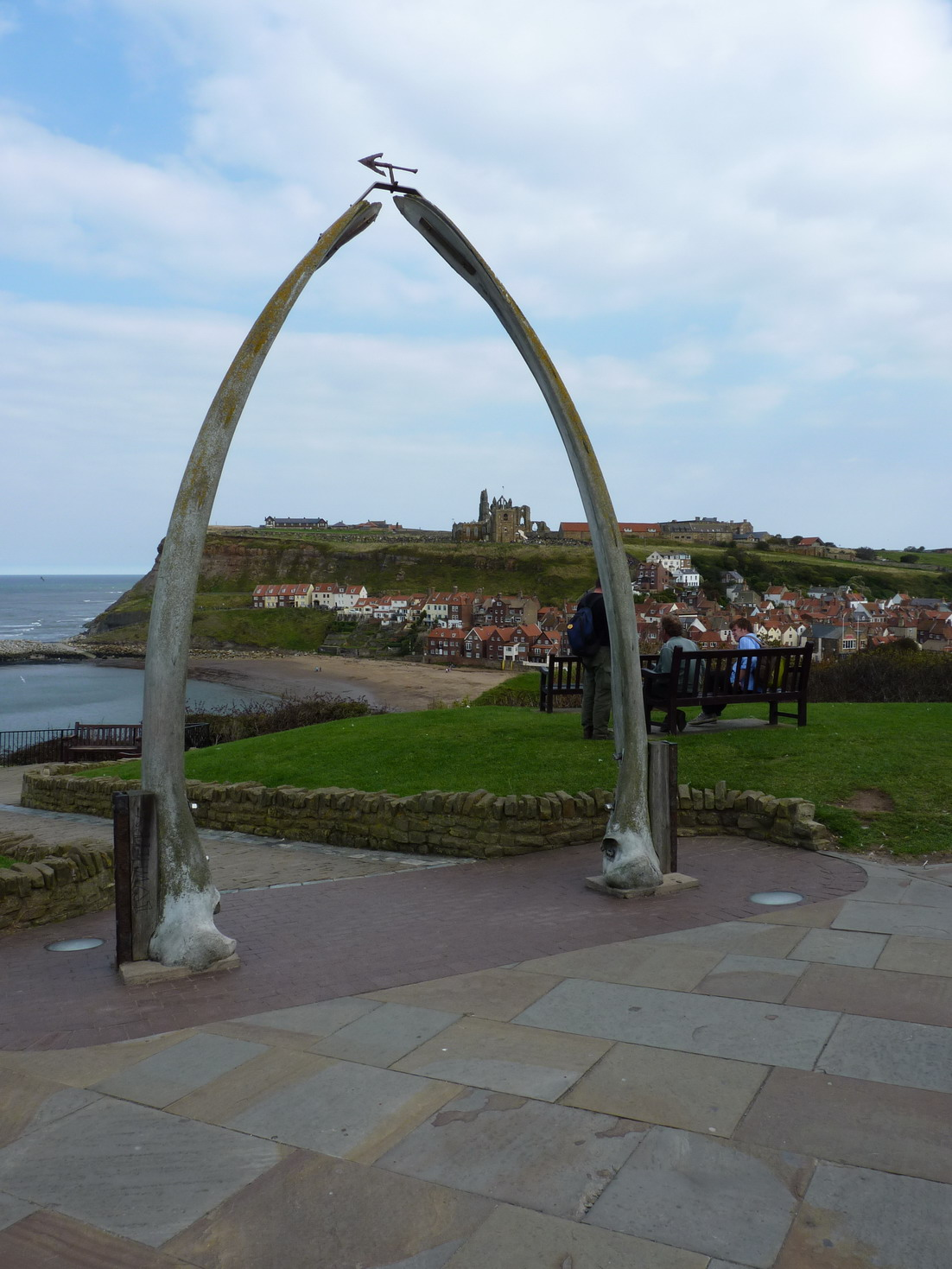
- East Whitby framed through the whalebone arch
- Interactive map of Whale Bone Arch
- Location: Whitby, North Yorkshire, England
- Coordinates: 54°29′25″N 0°36′59″W
- Material: Whale bones

The Whale Bone Arch is a landmark in Whitby, North Yorkshire, England, made from two lower jawbones of a whale. The original was erected some time after 1853 and has been replaced at least twice due to weathering. North Yorkshire Council will replace the current bones with a bronze replica.
