= Caedmon College =

Secondary school in Whitby, England

Coordinates: 54°28′55.5″N 0°37′25.6″W

Whitby School

Location
- Prospect Hill / Airy Hill; Whitby; North Yorkshire, YO21 1LA / YO21 1QA; England

Information
- Former names: Caedmon College Whitby, Whitby Community College, Whitby School, The County School - Whitby
- Type: Community school
- Motto: Ad Finem Terrae ('To the ends of Earth')
- Established: 1912
- School district: Scarborough
- Local authority: North Yorkshire Council
- Trust: Wonder Learning Partnership
- Department for Education URN: 121667 Tables
- Ofsted: Reports
- Chair of Governors: Mr R Fluin
- Head of School: Miss J Caddell
- Gender: Mixed
- Age: 11 to 18
- Enrolment: 832 as of June 2025
- Capacity: 1539 as of September 2024
- Houses: Adventure, Endeavour, Discovery, Resolution
- Colours: Blue, Yellow, Orange, White
- Website: http://www.whitbyschool.co.uk/

Caedmon College was a mixed secondary school and sixth form located in Whitby, North Yorkshire, England. The school is named after Cædmon, the earliest English (Northumbrian) poet whose name is known.

Established in 1912 as the County School, Whitby, it was a mixed grammar school for pupils aged 11 to 18 until 1972 when it became comprehensive and was renamed Whitby School. At this time the school starting age decreased to 14. The school was renamed Whitby Community College in 1993 when the school started to offer adult education classes. In September 2014 Whitby Community College merged with Caedmon School to form Caedmon College and increased its starting age to 11 once again. Caedmon College was a community school administered by North Yorkshire Council. The emblem of the County School was Captain Cook's ship HMS Endeavour, portrayed with the Whitby ammonites on the sail and a flag composed of the flag of England with the upper third having three white roses on a red background.

Caedmon College offers GCSEs, BTECs and Cambridge Nationals as programmes of study for pupils, while students in the sixth form have the option to study from a range of A-levels and further BTECs.

In February 2019 the college agreed to federate with nearby Eskdale School creating the Whitby Secondary Partnership.

In September 2024 Eskdale School was closed and merged with Caedmon College to become Whitby School once more. Whitby School is a community school administered by North Yorkshire Council. Offering GCSEs, BTECs and Cambridge Nationals as programmes of study for pupils, while students in the sixth form have the option to study from a range of A-levels and further BTECs.

== Publications ==
The school magazine of the County School, Whitby, was called The Viking. It was published twice a year from 1914. The 50 year Jubilee edition was published in 1962.

== Staff ==
Headmasters The first headmaster was Dr W. A. Bradley; on 29 July 1920 he and the senior mistress, Miss M. Jones were married. On the retirement of Dr Bradley in 1934 Mr H. J. Davis became the new Head and he retired in 1966.

Headmistresses Miss J. S. Davidson 1912 – 1917, Miss W. Boyd 1917 – 1919, Miss C. A. Bateman 1919 – 1920, Mrs W. A. Bradley 1920 – 1923, Miss L. L. Ross 1924 – 1952, Miss B. M. Mills 1953 –
