= Carchesium (container) =

Kind of ancient drinkware

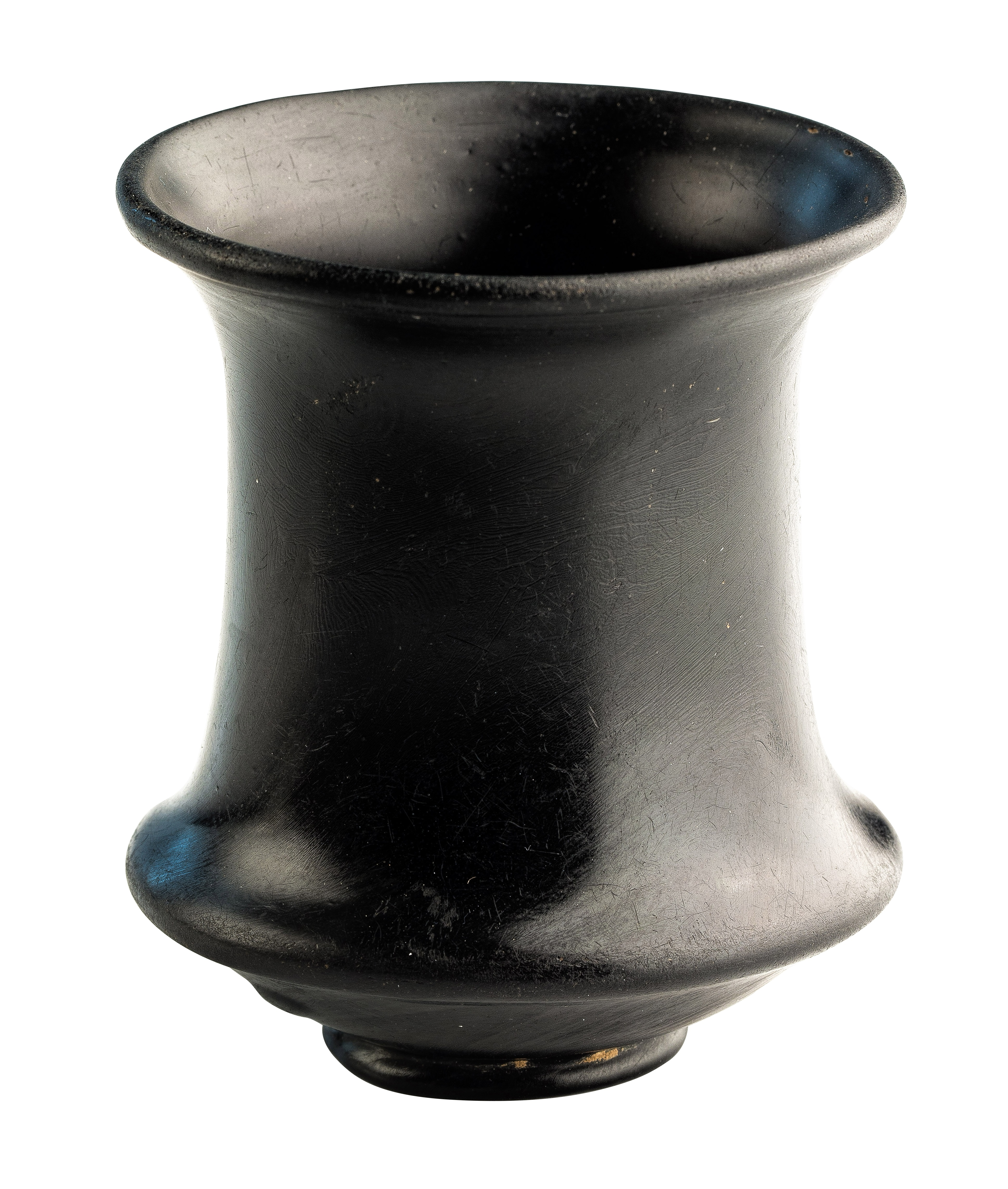
A carchesium from c. 170–250 held by the Gallo-Roman Museum in Tongeren, Belgium

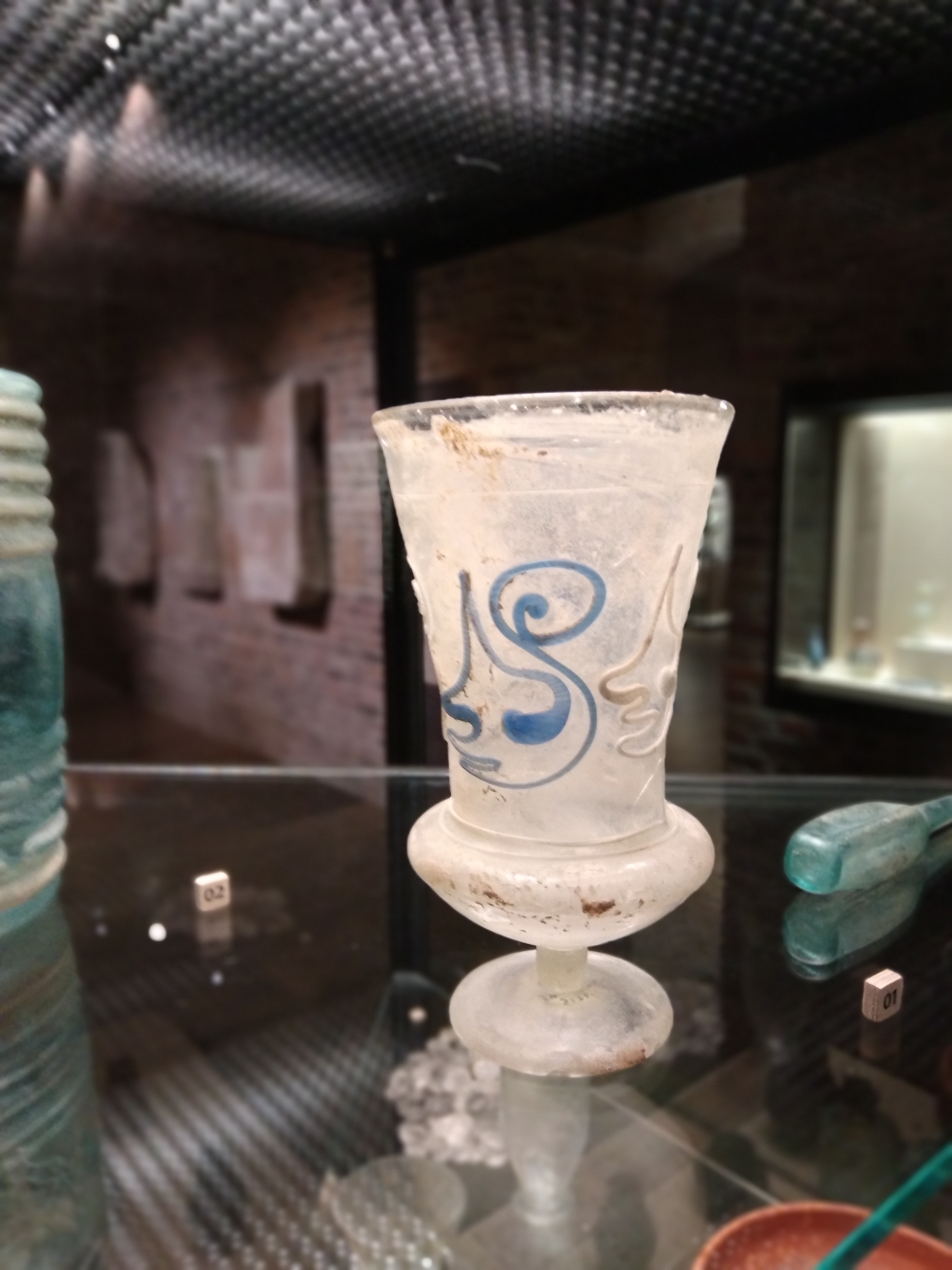
A glass carchesium (3rd cent.) held by the Picardy Museum in Amiens, France.

A carchesium (Latin), carchesion, or karkhesion (Ancient Greek: καρχήσιον, karkhḗsion) was a kind of drinkware of the ancient Greeks and Romans. It is variously glossed as a cup, beaker, or goblet.

Carchesia seem to have had several different forms but were generally somewhat elongated and narrower in the middle than at the top or bottom. They were used for wine in ancient Greece and Rome, as well as milk. They sometimes bore narrow handles. Carchasia were notably used in ritual libation, with Vergil having Aeneas pour out 2 of pure wine, 2 of fresh milk, and 2 of sacred blood over the tomb of his father Anchises. It was also used for pouring out offerings of honey. In late Antiquity, Sidonius associated the vessel with the Chaldeans of Babylonia.

The cup gave its name to the version of a crow's nest used on Greek and Roman ships and to the crane mechanism that could be operated from it. It was glossed in Old English as bune, which appeared repeatedly in the dragon's hoard in Beowulf, probably to denote its antiquity and exoticness to listeners. A large carchesium was given by King Charles the Simple of France to the Abbey of Saint Denis in the early 10th century.
