= Crow's nest =

Structure in the upper part of the main mast of a ship, used as a lookout point

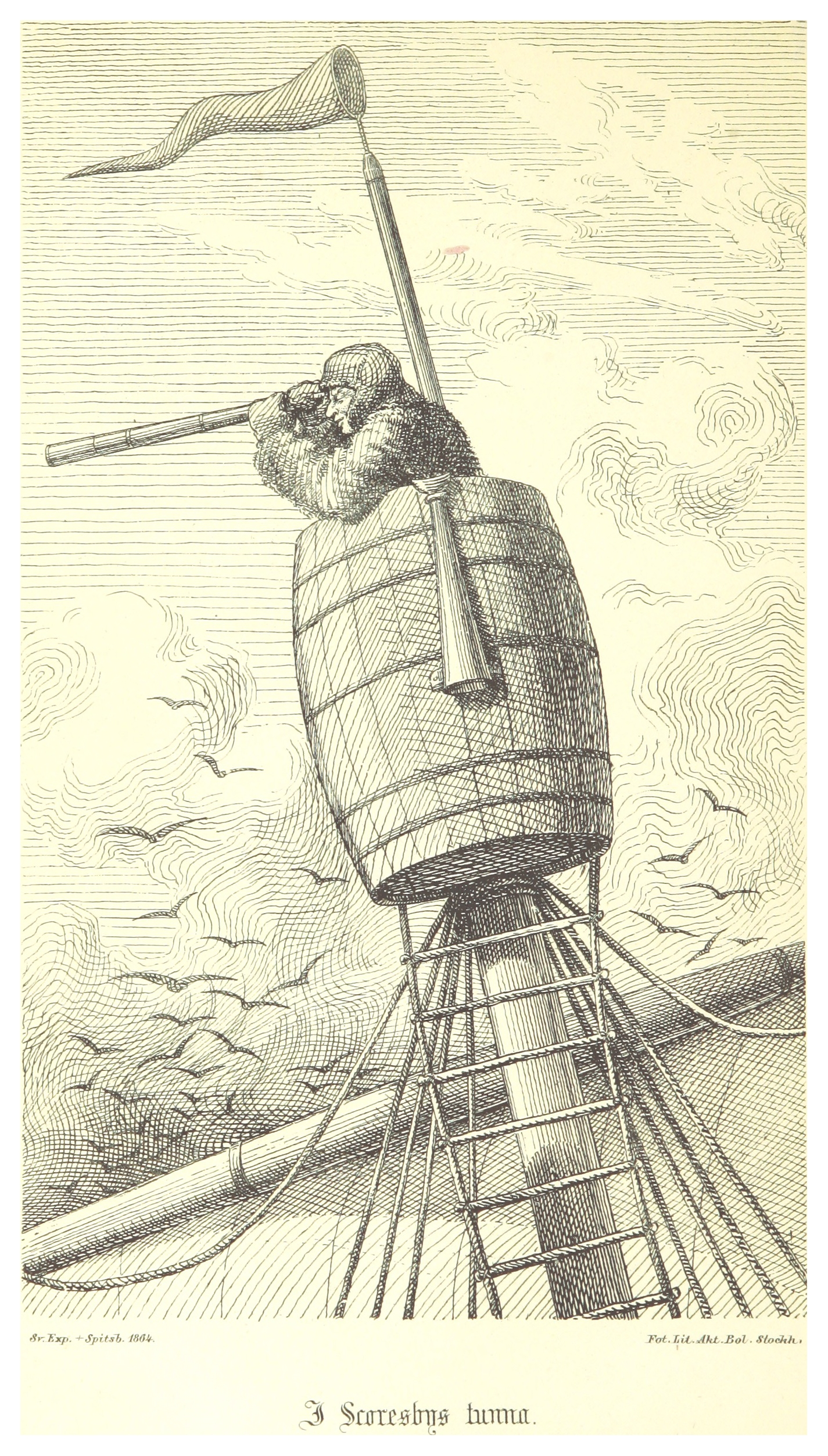
1867 illustration of a crow's nest on a traditional ship with a lookout holding up a telescope

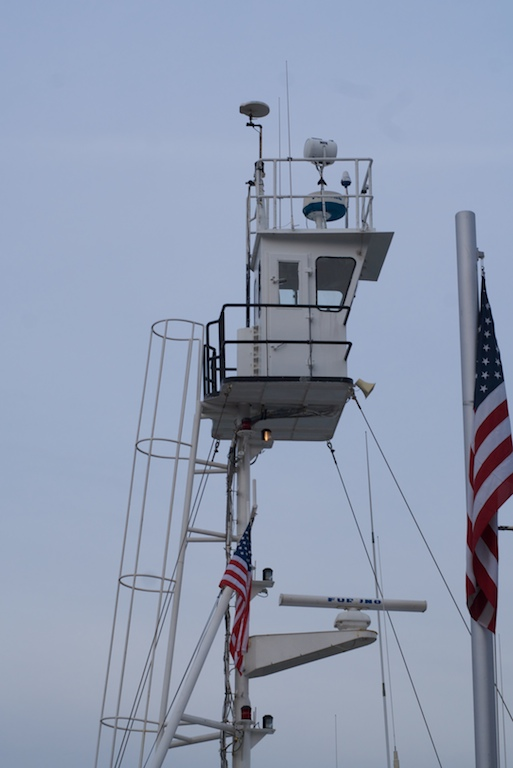
Crow's nest on a tugboat.

A crow's nest is a structure in the upper part of the main mast of a ship or a structure that is used as a lookout point. On ships, this position ensured the widest field of view for lookouts to spot approaching hazards, other ships, or land by using the naked eye or optical devices such as telescopes or binoculars. It should not be confused with the top, the platform in the upper part of each lower mast of a square-rigged sailing ship.

== History ==
The form of crow's nest used by the ancient Greeks and Romans was the carchesium (Ancient Greek: καρχήσιον, karkhḗsion), named after a supposed similarity to a kind of ritual wine goblet.

According to William Scoresby Jr., the crow's nest was invented in the 19th century by his father, William Scoresby Sr., a whaler and also an Arctic explorer. However, Scoresby Sr. may simply have made an improvement on existing designs. Crow's nests appear in Egyptian reliefs as early as 1200 BC and on eighth to seventh century BC representations of Phoenician, Etruscan, and Boiotian ships. Similar structures can also been seen in 15th-century sources, for example Jean Froissart's depiction of the Battle of Sluys. Theon of Smyrna wrote that by climbing the mast of a ship, one could see land that is invisible to those on deck.

The first recorded appearance of the term was in 1807, used to describe Scoresby Sr.'s barrel crows nest platform. According to a popular naval legend, the term derives from the practice of Viking sailors, who carried crows or ravens in a cage secured to the top of the mast. In cases of poor visibility, a crow was released, and the navigator plotted a course corresponding to the bird's flight path because the bird invariably headed "as the crow flies" towards the nearest land. However, other naval scholars have found no evidence of the masthead crow cage and suggest the name was coined because Scoresby's lookout platform resembled a crow's nest in a tree.

Since the crow's nest is a point far away from the ship's center of mass, rotational movement of the ship is amplified and could lead to severe seasickness, even in accustomed sailors. Therefore, being sent to the crow's nest was also considered a punishment.

== Other uses ==
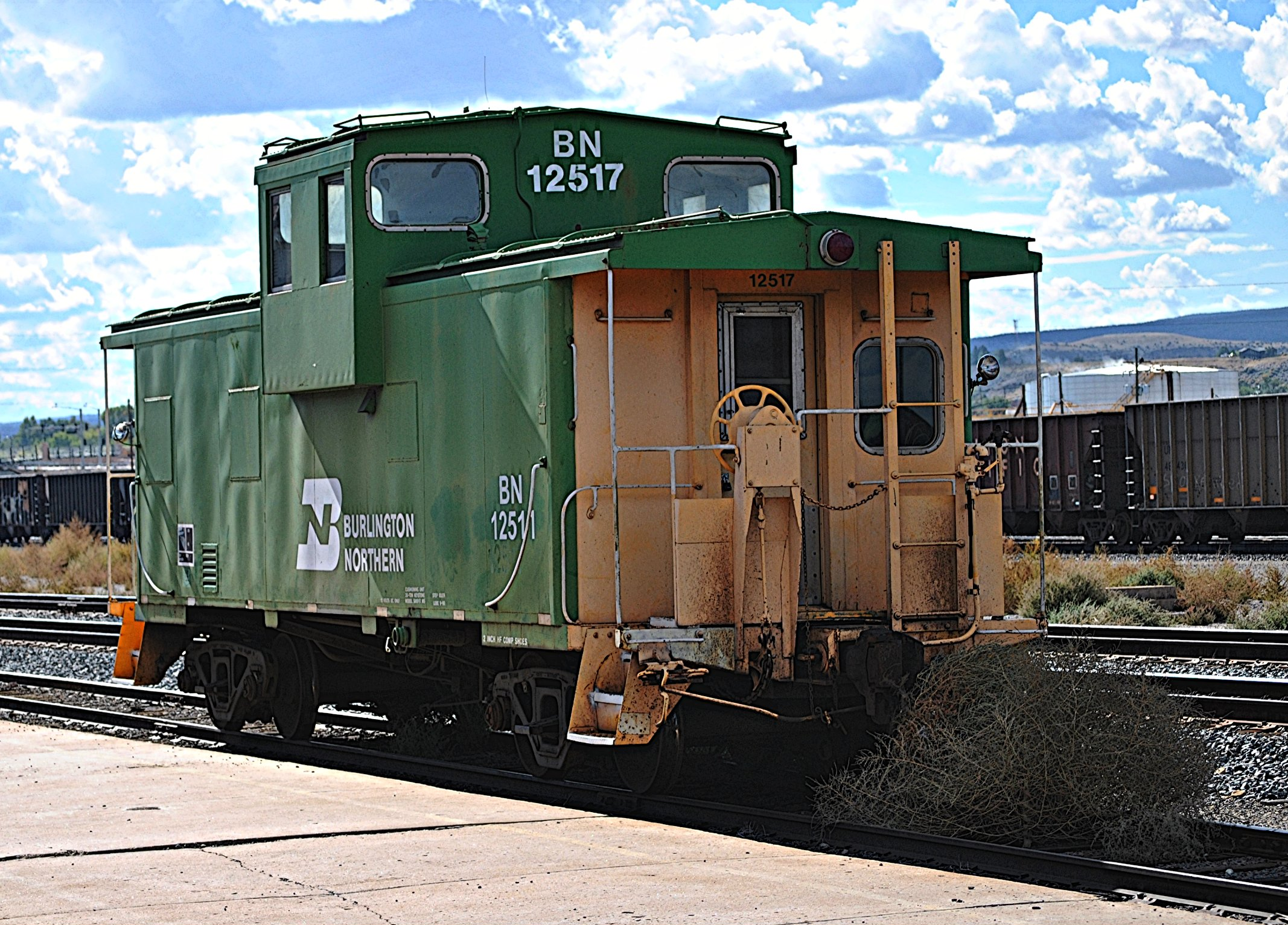
A caboose with a crow's nest (aka angel seat)

In classic railroad trains, the box-like structure above the caboose, the cupola, was also called the crow's nest. It served for observation of the whole train when in motion.

In hunting, a crow's nest is a blind-like structure where a hunter or a pair of hunters commit themselves to stalking game. A crow's nest is not a normal type of purchasable blind, but an improvised position, built by using locally discovered natural flora (tree branches, moss, snow (during winter) or sand (during summer), etc.). A crow's nest works in most environments and provides a good lookout point (hence the name) when built in an elevated position like a hillside or top of a hill.

The term is sometimes used metaphorically for the topmost structures in buildings, towers, etc. Such structures are often referred to as a Widow's walk.
