= William Scoresby (1760–1829) =

English arctic navigator

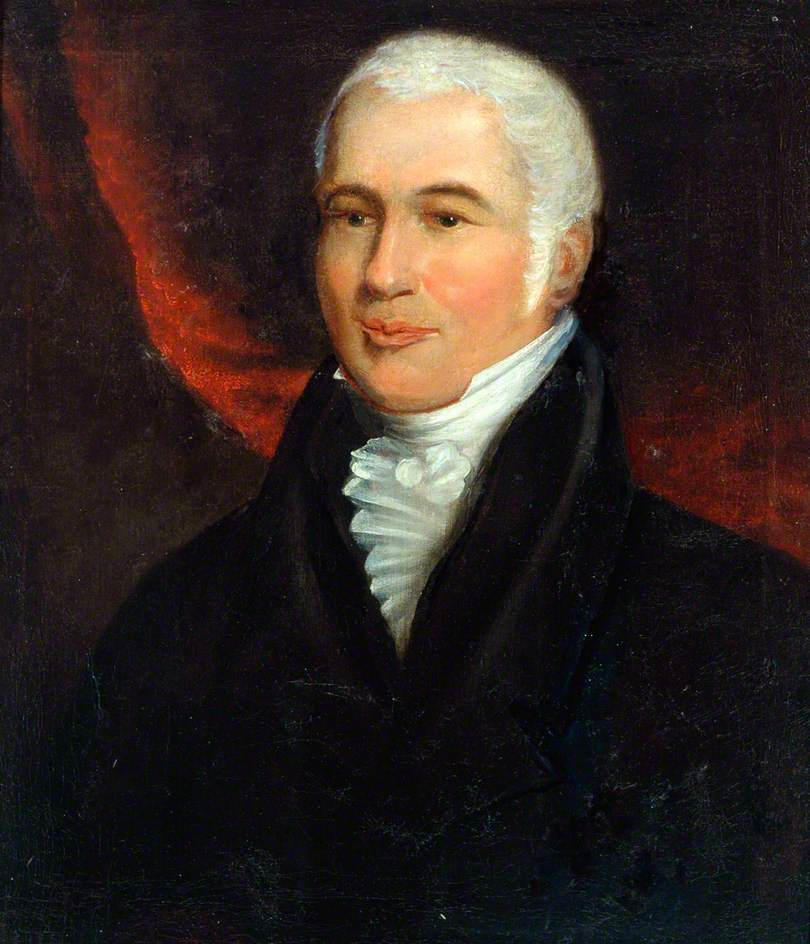
- Born: 3 May 1760
- Died: 1829 (aged 68–69)
- Occupation: Arctic navigator

William Scoresby (3 May 1760 – 1829), known as "William Scoresby Senior" to distinguish him from his son, was an English whaler and arctic navigator.

== Biography ==
Scoresby was the son of a small farmer at Cropton, twenty miles from Whitby. He was born on 3 May 1760. After attending the village school he was employed about the farm from the age of nine, and occasionally worked for neighbouring farmers. In his twentieth year he bound himself for three years as an apprentice to the captain of a ship called the Jane, trading from Whitby to the Baltic. He joined her in March 1780. He had already studied navigation, his knowledge and practice of which enabled him, in the second year of his service at sea, to detect an error in the reckoning which would otherwise have caused the loss of the ship. The only reward he got was the ill-will of the mate, whose blunder he had exposed. This caused him to leave the ship at London in October 1781, and enter on board an ordnance ship, the Speedwell, carrying out stores to Gibraltar. At the entrance of the Straits the Speedwell fell in with the Spanish fleet and was captured. Her men were taken to Cadiz, and thence sent inland to San Lucar de Mayor, from which, being carelessly guarded, Scoresby and one of his companions managed to escape. After various adventures they succeeded in reaching Cadiz, where they got on board an English cartel and were taken to England. On his return home Scoresby engaged once more in farm work during 1783 and 1784. Meantime he married the daughter of a neighbouring farmer, and, with the prospect of a family, his old ambition returned. In the spring of 1785 he engaged himself on board the ship Henrietta, employed in the Greenland whale fishery, and for the next six years continued in her, going to Greenland each summer, and in the winter taking casual employment on board coasting vessels. After the voyage of 1790 the captain of the Henrietta retired on his savings, and recommended Scoresby as his successor. The owner appointed Scoresby to the command. After commanding the Henrietta for seven seasons, Scoresby's reputation in the trade stood high, and in the beginning of 1798 he accepted the more advantageous offers of a London firm to command their ship, the Dundee of London. The Dundee was as successful as the Henrietta. In 1802 he joined a small company at Whitby, thus becoming owner of one-eighth of a new ship, the Resolution, of 291 tons, which he was to command on the same terms as had been given him by the London firm. From 1803 to 1810 inclusive he sailed each season in her, and each season returned with a good cargo, the profits to the company being at the average rate of 25 per cent. per annum on the capital invested.

At the end of the voyage of 1810 he resigned the command of the Resolution in favour of his son, and himself took command of the John, belonging to the Greenock whale-fishing company, consisting of four partners, of whom he was one. After the season of 1814 he resigned the John in favour of his daughter's husband, and remained on shore in 1815. In the following year he was at sea again in command of the Mars of Whitby, belonging to one of his partners in the Resolution. In the autumn of 1817 he bought, entirely on his own account, a teak-built ship, the Fame, brought into England as a prize from the French. He had hopes that she might be taken up by the government for a voyage of arctic discovery under the command of his son, and only at the last moment, when the government resolved otherwise, made up his mind to send her to the fishery. In 1819 and the three following years he took command of her himself. She sailed for another voyage in 1823, but was accidentally burnt at the Orkneys. Scoresby, having now acquired a ‘handsome competence,’ returned to Whitby, where he lived till his death in 1829.

The net profits of Scoresby's thirty voyages as a captain were estimated at 90,000l., or an average of upwards of 30 per cent. per annum on the capital employed. He is described as of about six feet in height, and of extraordinary muscular power, a first-rate seaman and navigator, and of a judgment which, cultivated by experience and reflection, became almost instinctive. It was this that, in May 1806 for instance, led him to force the Resolution through the pack into open water beyond the 80th parallel, when he attained the latitude of 81° 30′, long the highest reached by a ship, and completed his cargo in thirty-two days with ‘twenty-four whales, two seals, two walruses, two bears, and a narwhal.’ Exploration was not his business, but he did much to render arctic navigation more certain, and more feasible, by the introduction of new methods, and by inventions, such as the ice-drill, or improvements of fittings, such as the crow's nest, the shelter for the look-out at the masthead, in which he was accustomed to spend hours, or even days. He married, in 1783, Lady Mary Smith (Lady Mary being her Christian name, given her in commemoration of her having been born on Lady-day), daughter of John Smith of Cropton, and had issue. His son William was also an Arctic explorer.
