= William Scoresby =

English Arctic explorer and whaler (1789–1857)

William Scoresby FRS FRSE
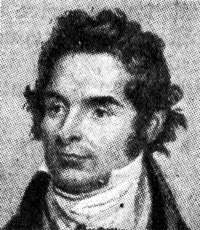
- Born: 5 October 1789; Cropton, Yorkshire, England
- Died: 21 March 1857 (aged 67); Torquay, Devon, England
- Education: Queens' College, Cambridge; Edinburgh University
- Known for: Arctic exploration

William Scoresby FRS FRSE (5 October 1789 – 21 March 1857), known as "William Scoresby Junior" to distinguish him from his father, was an English whaler, Arctic explorer, scientist and clergyman.

== Early years ==
Scoresby was born in the village of Cropton near Pickering 26 miles (42 km) south-west of Whitby in Yorkshire. His father, William Scoresby (1760–1829), made a fortune in the Arctic whale fishery and was also the inventor of the barrel crow's nest. The son made his first voyage with his father at the age of eleven, but then returned to school, where he remained until 1803.

After this he became his father's constant companion, and accompanied him as chief officer of the whaler Resolution when on 25 May 1806, he succeeded in reaching 81°30′ N. lat. (19° E. long), for twenty-one years the highest northern latitude attained in the eastern hemisphere. During the following winter, Scoresby attended the natural philosophy and chemistry classes at the University of Edinburgh, and again in 1809.

== Scientist ==
In his voyage of 1807, Scoresby began the study of the meteorology and natural history of the polar regions. Earlier results included his original observations on snow and crystals; and in 1809 Robert Jameson brought certain Arctic papers of his before the Wernerian Society of Edinburgh, which at once elected him to its membership.

In 1811, Scoresby's father resigned to him the command of Resolution. In the same year he married the daughter of a Whitby shipbroker. In his voyage of 1813, he established for the first time the fact that the polar ocean has a warmer temperature at considerable depths than it has on the surface, and each subsequent voyage in search of whales found him no less eager of fresh additions to scientific knowledge. His letters of this period to Sir Joseph Banks, whose acquaintance he had made a few years earlier, no doubt gave the first impulse to the search for the North-West Passage which followed. On 29 June 1816, commanding Esk on his fifteenth whaling voyage from Whitby, Scoresby encountered grave problems when ice damaged his ship. With the aid of his brother-in-law's crew on board the John, and after agreeing to surrendering much of their catch, Esk was repaired, of which Scoresby recounted in his 1820 book The Northern Whale-Fishery.

In 1819, Scoresby was elected a Fellow of the Royal Society of Edinburgh. His proposers were Robert Jameson, John Playfair and Sir G S Mackenzie. About the same time he communicated a paper to the Royal Society of London: "On the Anomaly in the Variation of the Magnetic Needle". In 1820, he published An Account of the Arctic Regions and Northern Whale Fishery, in which he gathers up the results of his own observations, as well as those of previous navigators.

In 1820 and 1821 he commanded Fame on whale hunting voyages to the Greenland whale fishery. In 1821 he was accompanied on Baffin (1820) of Liverpool to Greenland by George Manby, who wished to test a new type of harpoon for whaling, based on the same principles as his Manby mortar. Manby published his account in 1822 as Journal of a Voyage to Greenland, containing observations on the flora and fauna of the Arctic regions as well as the practice of whale hunting.

In his voyage of 1822 to Greenland, Scoresby surveyed and charted with remarkable accuracy 400 miles of the east coast, between 69° 30′ and 72° 30′, thus contributing to the first real and important geographic knowledge of East Greenland. This, however, proved to be the last of his Arctic voyages. On his return, he learnt of his wife's death, and this event, with other influences acting upon his naturally pious spirit, decided him to enter the church.

Scoresby's Journal of a Voyage to the Northern Whale Fishery, including Researches and Discoveries on the Eastern Coast of Greenland (1823), appeared at Edinburgh. In 1824, the Royal Society elected him a fellow, and in 1827, he became an honorary corresponding member of the Paris Academy of Sciences.

From the first, Scoresby worked as an active member and official of the British Association for the Advancement of Science, and he contributed especially to the knowledge of terrestrial magnetism. Of his sixty papers in the Royal Society list, many relate to this department of research. However, his observations extended into many other departments, including researches on optics and, with James Joule, comparing electromagnetic (chemical), thermal (coal/steam), and organic (horse) power sources.

To obtain additional data for his theories on magnetism, he made a voyage to Australia in 1856 on board the ill-fated iron-hulled Royal Charter, the results of which appeared in a posthumous publication: Journal of a Voyage to Australia for Magnetical Research, edited by Archibald Smith (1859). He made two visits to America, in 1844 and 1848; on his return home from the latter visit he made observations on the height of Atlantic waves, the results of which were given to the British Association. He interested himself much in social questions, especially the improvement of the condition of factory operatives.

In 1850, Scoresby published a work urging the prosecution of the search for the Franklin expedition and giving the results of his own experience in Arctic navigation.

== Clerical career ==
Scoresby began divinity studies at Queens' College, Cambridge, enrolling under the ten-year divinity statute and thus becoming a ten-year man, and also became the curate of Bessingby, Yorkshire. In 1834 he received his bachelor's degree in divinity (BD) from Cambridge University, and in 1839, was awarded an honorary doctorate, Doctor of Divinity (DD). Clerical duties at Bessingby, and later at Liverpool, Exeter and Bradford, co-existed with his interest in science. He published numerous works and papers of a religious character.

From 1839 to 1846 Scoresby was vicar of Bradford, Yorkshire, a "large, industrial, dissenting parish", also described as an "ever-expanding, raucous, restless industrial conurbation", 15 miles (24 km) across. The appointment to Bradford had been in the hands of the Simeon Trust, since Charles Simeon's death in 1836. His predecessor Henry Heap (died 1839), had let the administration slide. There were 13 Bradford curates, counting incumbent perpetual curates, who included Patrick Brontë and William Morgan (1782–1858). There were new churches, such as St James's built by John Wood, and one at Wibsey under construction by the Hardy family, ironmasters.

Scoresby addressed matters in hand, but succeeded only in generating contentious issues. On finance, he took on Wood in 1840, over surplice fees in his new church, and was opposed by Wood's "factory movement" allies and others. St James's was closed for a period, and Wood moved away to the south. Scoresby believed in smaller catchment districts for churches; he clashed with Morgan over this issue. He tried unsuccessfully to divide the parish in 1843. Suffering a breakdown in health, Scoresby resigned as vicar in 1846, after a tour in the US to look at industrial conditions. He took no further permanent clerical posts.

== Personal ==
Scoresby married three times. After his third marriage (1849), he built a villa at Torquay, where he was appointed honorary lecturer at the Parish church of St Mary Magdalene, Upton.

He died in Torquay on 21 March 1857. He is buried in the churchyard at Upton and commemorated by a memorial which is decorated with mariner's compass and dividers, and a Bible. He is also memorialised on the family grave in Whitby. His sister Arabella Scoresby was mother to the physician Robert Edmund Scoresby-Jackson FRSE.

== Legacy ==
A number of places have been named after him, including:

- the Lunar crater Scoresby
- Scoresbysund, now Ittoqqortoormiit on the east coast of Greenland
- the Scoresby Sund fjord system
- the Melbourne suburb of Scoresby, Victoria in Australia, which is 25 km southeast of the CBD
- RRS William Scoresby, an early-twentieth-century research vessel in the employ of the British scientific organisation, Discovery Investigations;
  - William Scoresby Bay and the William Scoresby Archipelago, off the Antarctic coast, are named after RRS William Scoresby.
- Scoresby Land in Greenland
- Cape Scoresby (66°34′S 162°45′E / 66.567°S 162.75°E / -66.567; 162.75), bluff marking the north end of Borradaile Island.
- Scoresbyøya, which means Scoresby Island in English. A small island of 6 km^{2}, north of Nordaustlandet, Svalbard, Norway.

== References in media ==
Herman Melville's main character Ishmael quotes Scoresby in the Cetology chapter of Moby-Dick: "'No branch of Zoology is so much involved as that which is entitled Cetology,' says Captain Scoresby, A.D. 1820."

Philip Pullman's His Dark Materials trilogy features a character named Lee Scoresby, an intrepid explorer, old Arctic hand, and balloon aeronaut. Pullman has stated that the character was named after William Scoresby and Lee Van Cleef.

Scoresby is named in H. P. Lovecraft's science fiction-horror novella At the Mountains of Madness, as having observed and drawn "some of the wilder forms" of arctic mirages.

In James Cameron's Avatar series, the captain of the fleet of marine vessels hunting the whale-like Tulkun species is named Mick Scoresby.
