= Whitby Lifeboat Station =

RNLI Lifeboat station in North Yorkshire, England

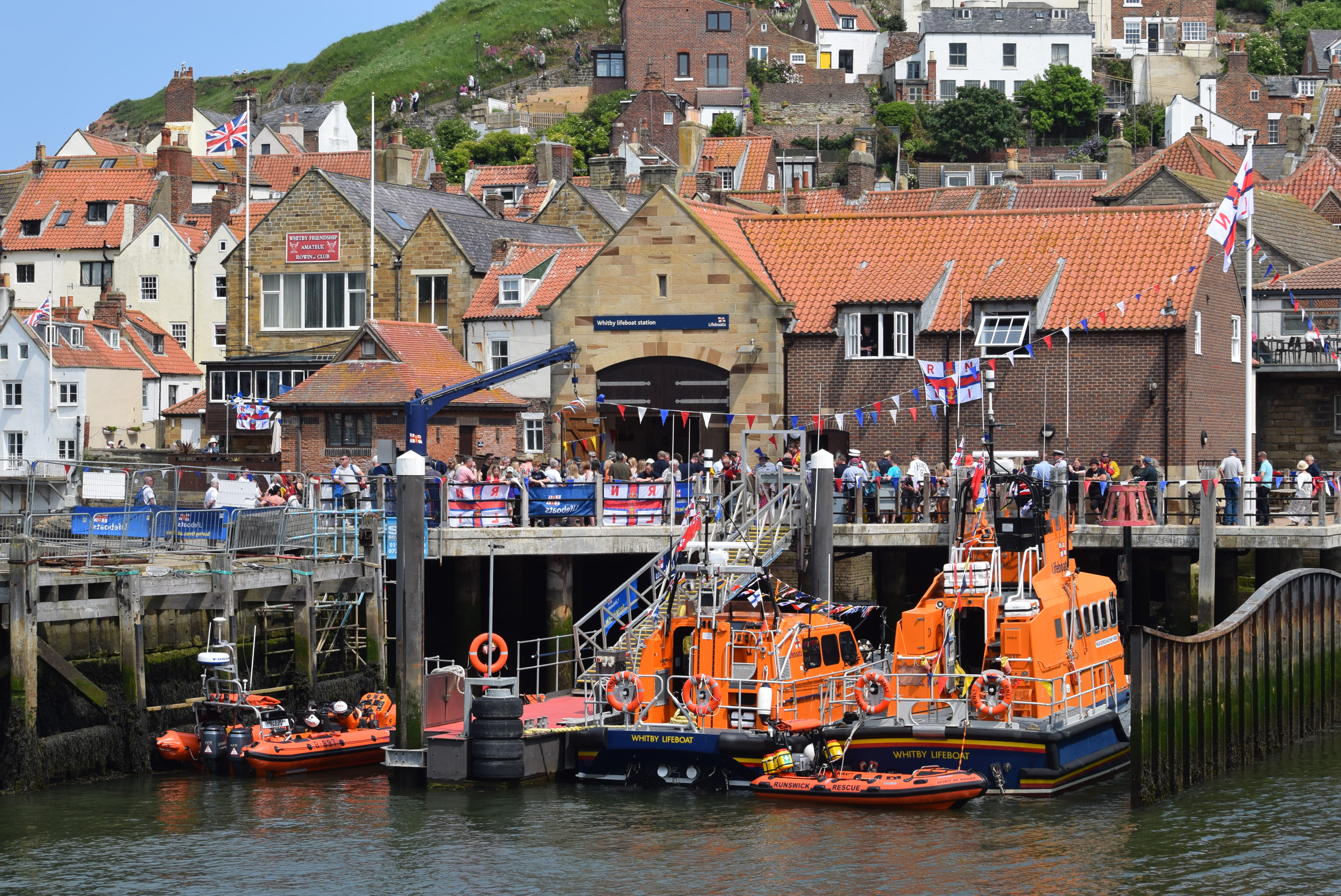
- Whitby Lifeboat Station, 11 June 2023

General information
- Type: RNLI Lifeboat Station
- Location: Market Place, Whitby, North Yorkshire, YO22 4DD, England
- Coordinates: 54.4881°N 0.6130°W
- Opened: 1802; 1861 RNLI
- Owner: Royal National Lifeboat Institution

Website
- Whitby RNLI Lifeboat Station

Whitby Lifeboat Station is located at Market Place, on the east side of the River Esk in Whitby, a seaside town and port in North Yorkshire, England. It is one of eight lifeboat stations situated along the Yorkshire coast.

Whitby has had a lifeboat station since 1802, with management of the station transferring to the Royal National Lifeboat Institution (RNLI) in 1861. In its 200 plus year history, Whitby has had seven different lifeboat stations (although not all operated at the same time). An eighth lifeboat station was located at Upgang, just up the coast from Whitby, and whilst it was considered separate from Whitby, it was crewed by Whitby lifeboat men.

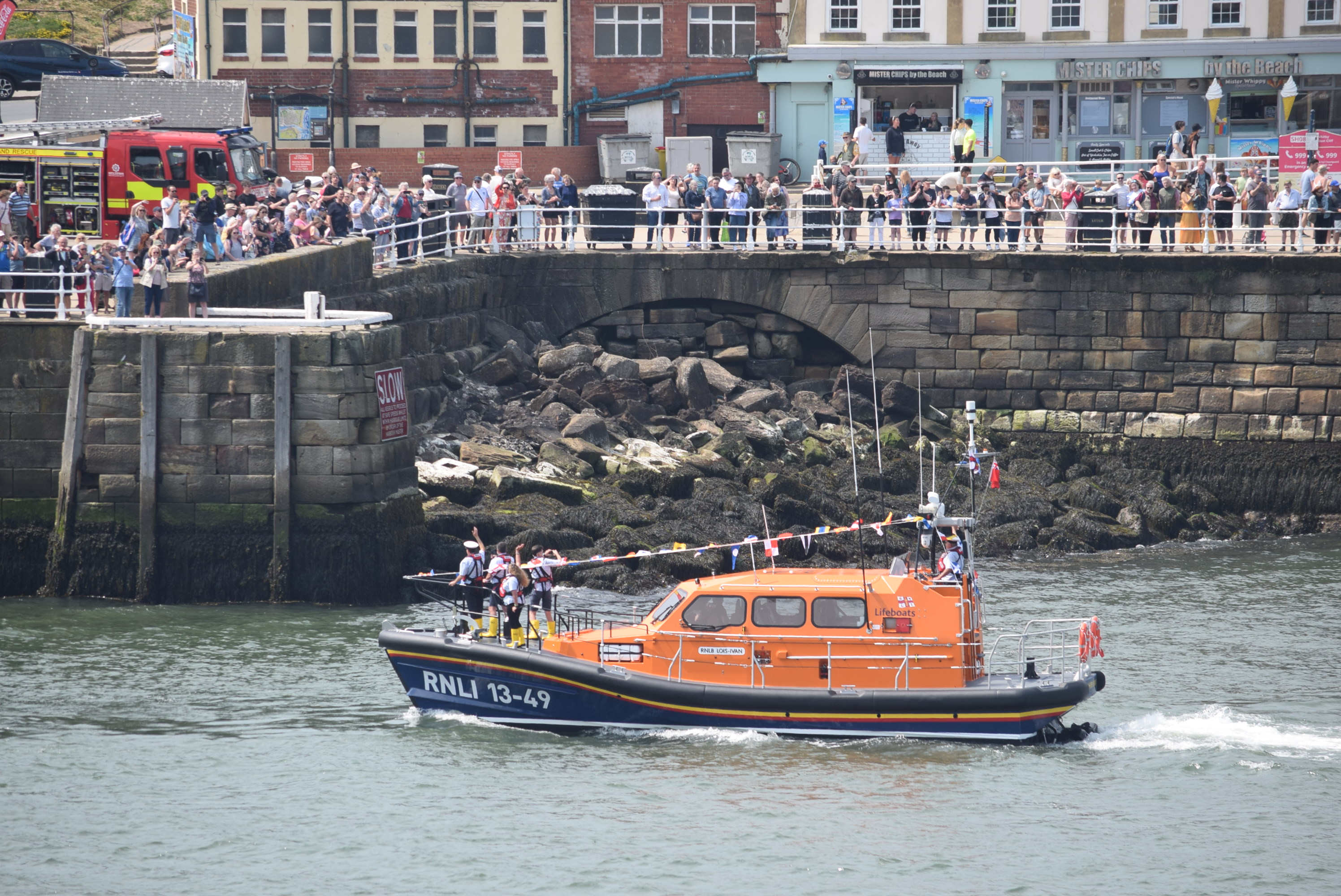
Shannon-class lifeboat 13-49 Lois Ivan (ON 1356), June 2023

The station currently operates two lifeboats; a 13-metre (43 ft) Shannon-class All-weather lifeboat (ALB), 13-49 Lois Ivan (ON 1356), on station since 2023, and the smaller D-class (IB1) Inshore lifeboat (ILB), Warter Priory (D-810), on station since 2017.

== History ==
The first lifeboat to be stationed at Whitby was in 1802 on the west side of the river. This had been paid for by a combination of local finance and an offer from Lloyd's of London, who contributed £50 of the £160 needed for a lifeboat. A 30-foot 10-oared lifeboat was constructed by Henry Greathead of South Shields, at a cost of £160, arriving in Whitby on 15 September 1802. The boat was kept on a carriage, in a boathouse near the West Pier.

By 1817, the Greathead lifeboat was reported as being unserviceable. No more details are available, until 1822, when two new lifeboats were placed at Whitby. A 26-foot 6in long 10-oared boat was constructed by Wake of Sunderland to replace the Greathead boat. It was kept in the same boathouse, and called "West Side Lifeboat". A No.2 station was created with the second boat, a 26-foot 10-oared lifeboat, constructed by local boatbuilder Christopher Gale, and launched from davits on Tate Hill Pier, where a boathouse was built out for protection. The boat was known as the "East Side Lifeboat".

By 1859, the "West Side Lifeboat" was found to be rotten, and a new 30-foot boat was ordered from local boatbuilder Francis Falkingbridge, costing £130, and delivered in September 1860. This boat would be involved in the 1861 disaster as documented later.

The lifeboat disaster of 1861, when twelve of the lifeboatmen died, prompted a local fund-raising effort for their widows and children. This eventually raised over £8,000, but the trustees of the fund thought that supplying the money to the widows and orphans might give them ideas above their station, so a memorial was paid for instead, to be installed in the parish Church of St Mary in the town.

At a meeting of the RNLI committee of management on Thursday 7 March 1861, it was resolved to grant £50 to the Whitby Widow and Orphan fund. It was also noted that the local lifeboat committee at Whitby had decided to become a branch of the Institution, and to accept the offer of a new 32 ft (9.8 m) self-righting 'Pulling and Sailing' (P&S) lifeboat, with carriage. The Inspector of Lifeboats was invited to Whitby, and made arrangements for the complete re-organisation of the establishment.

A map showing the locations of both RNLI and independent lifeboat stations in Yorkshire

By the end of the 1865, Whitby had three lifeboats under the command of the harbour master. One of these was the Upgang Lifeboat, which was housed at a newly created station on a stretch of beach at Upgang, 1 mile (2 km) along the coast west towards Sandsend. The station had been created as in certain conditions, launching the Whitby harbour boats had proven extremely difficult. The RNLI always regarded Upgang as being a different lifeboat station, despite its proximity to Whitby, and the fact it was crewed by men from the Whitby station.

In 1881, a ship foundered during a heavy snowstorm in Robin Hood's Bay. The lifeboat stationed in that village was deemed to be unseaworthy and so a telegraph was sent to launch the Whitby lifeboat, the Robert Whitworth. Due to the heavy seas, this had to be taken over land through blizzards and snowdrifts. A similar situation occurred in April 1834, when the lifeboat from Whitby was carried overland to Robin Hood's bay to rescue two women in difficulty.

The sinking of the Rohilla in 1914 was attended by six lifeboats in all, but with all the other 'oar-powered' lifeboats struggling with the conditions, the rescue was only completed with the arrival of the motor-powered lifeboat from Tynemouth. After this, most RNLI crews were persuaded about the efficacy of using motorised boats over ones with oars; previously, many crews were suspicious of motorised lifeboats.

The Whitby lifeboat No.2 lifeboat John Fielden (ON 379) was badly damaged during the Rohilla rescue, and was subsequently withdrawn. Galvanised by the promise of a motor-powered lifeboat, local fundraising for a new lifeboat raised the considerable sum of £1,668-16s-4d. A sum of £1000 had been received by the Institution from the bequest of Miss Margaret Harker-Smith in 1914, but a proviso in her will allowed her trustees to apply a further sum, towards providing a lifeboat on the Yorkshire coast. The executors of her estate granted an additional sum of £6000.

At a ceremony held at 15:00 on Saturday 28 June 1919, coincidentally the same day as the signing of the Treaty of Versailles formally ending World War I, the new East Side motor-lifeboat house was formally opened. The building was funded by Mrs Humble, dedicated to the memory of her son, Lieut. F. H. G. Trumble, R.N, who was killed in action aboard HMS Warwick (D25) whilst off Ostend on 10 May 1918. Then followed the naming ceremony of the new 40 ft (12 m) self-righting (motor) lifeboat. A bottle of wine was broken over the bow, with the lifeboat duly named Margaret Harker-Smith (ON 667), after which the boat was launched down the slipway for demonstration.

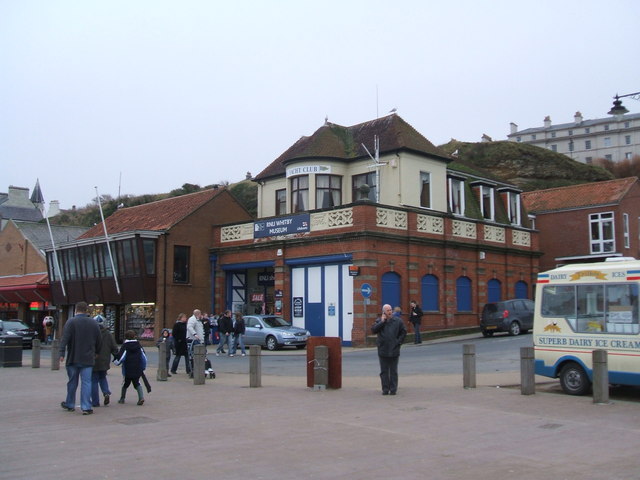
The Lifeboat Museum, Whitby

Despite the arrival of a motor-powered lifeboat, Whitby would retained a pulling and sailing lifeboat until 1957. The last one on station, Robert and Ellen Robson (ON 667), was the last rowing boat in operation by the RNLI. This boat is now on display in the RNLI museum in Whitby.

Following a surge in water-based leisure activity, the D-class (RFD PB16) Inshore lifeboat (D-84) was placed at Whitby in 1966, used for close inshore rescue work, inaccessible to the All-weather lifeboats.

On 7 September 2007, the Duchess of Kent formally opened the new £1million lifeboat station in Whitby. The new station was built on the site of the old motor lifeboat station (built in 1918 and in use since 1919), which had become life-expired, known to the crews as the "Tin Shed". Whilst the new lifeboat station was being constructed, the old West Side lifeboat station on Pier Road, now the museum, was resurrected as the lifeboat house for one year from 2006 to 2007.

In 2023, after serving Whitby for 27 years, the Trent-class All-weather lifeboat 14-14 George and Mary Webb (ON 1212) was transferred to the training fleet. A new Shannon-class All-weather lifeboat, 13-49 Lois Ivan (ON 1356), arrived in Whitby on 11 June 2023.

== Locations ==
The various lifeboat stations in Whitby are detailed as follows, located on the West or East side of the River Esk.

Name	Dates	Side	Location	Notes
Whitby No.1	1802–1847	West	West Pier.	Closed when the Khyber Pass was cut in the town, so the lifeboat house was moved further inland. (Note: The Khyber Pass was cut out of the West Cliff at the behest of George Hudson who built the Royal Crescent at the top of the cliff. The road curves 180 degrees and rises up the hill before curving another 180 degrees back on itself to access the cliff top.)
Whitby No.2	1822–1863	East	On Davits, Tate Hill (East) Pier.	
Whitby No.1	1847–1895	West	Pier Road	Demolished, and rebuilt to house No.1 and No.2 lifeboats, 1895.
Whitby No.2	1863–1895	West	Wooden boathouse at the foot of the Khyber Pass.	
Upgang	1865–1919	West	Located just over 1 mile (1.6 km) west of Whitby Harbour.	After closure, the Upgang lifeboat William Riley of Birmingham and Leamington (ON 594) was transferred to Whitby No.2.
Whitby No.1 (until 1934); Whitby No.2	1895–1957	West	Pier Road	No.1 lifeboat withdrawn in 1934. No.2 lifeboat withdrawn in November 1957. Building re-opened on 26 July 1958 as the Whitby Lifeboat Museum.
Whitby (Motor)	1919–2006	East	Market place.	Closed and demolished in 2006.
Whitby	2007–	East	Market place.	Built on the site of the former 1919 Motor lifeboat station.

== Notable incidents ==
Between 1802 (when the first lifeboat was launched at Whitby) and 2009, 24 lifeboat crew members were lost from Whitby. Their names are commemorated in the RNLI memorial at Poole in Dorset. A news report in 2022 stated that in its more than 200-year history, the Whitby lifeboat had been launched over 2,900 times, and saved over 1,230 people.

=== Lifeboat disaster (1841) ===
On 6 October 1841, the east-side lifeboat was on her way to the rescue of two yawls foundering in Whitby Bay. The lifeboat capsized and four lifeboatmen lost their lives.

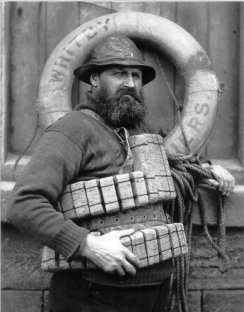
Henry Freeman (lifeboatman) Attribution: Frank Meadow Sutcliffe and The Sutcliffe Gallery

=== Lifeboat disaster (1861) ===
On 9 February 1861, a severe storm struck the east coast of England which resulted in 200 ships being wrecked. The crew had already been out and responded to five ships in distress, when responding to the sixth, a huge wave capsized their vessel. The only survivor of the incident was Henry Freeman, the only member of the crew wearing a cork lifejacket; the other twelve crew, all of who drowned, were wearing their traditional ballast filled lifebelts. (Note: The story is that the captain of the lifeboat, Jon Storr, had given the new type lifebelt to Henry Freeman as he was the youngest crew member. The other crew members wore their traditional life belts filled with ballast. The new life jacket had been sent out to all local lifeboat stations by the RNLI in an effort to persuade them to become part of a nationally supported organisation which it would be hoped would be better resourced and staffed.)

=== Agenoria (1877) ===
The schooner Agenoria which was transporting coal from Hartlepool to Whitby ran aground just outside Whitby harbour on 10 January 1877. The Whitby lifeboat Harriott Forteath launched to try and effect a rescue. During the swell, she capsized and all but one of her 12 crew were thrown into the water. One swam ashore, seven got back into the vessel, but three members of the RNLI crew drowned, with their bodies washing up on the beaches around Whitby in the following days.

=== The Visitor (1881) ===
The brig Visitor foundered in the bay of Robin Hood's Bay in November 1881, and after the hold was flooded with 5 feet (1.5 m) of water, the crew abandoned ship into their lifeboat. The Robin Hood's Bay RNLI lifeboat station had been closed in 1855, and the unofficial lifeboat in the village was deemed "unseaworthy" (Note: Some reports described the boat as being rotten.) and so a telegraph was sent to launch the Whitby Lifeboat. The seas were too rough to launch from Whitby and row around the coastline, so a decision was made to haul Robert Whitworth the 6 miles (9.7 km) overland to Robin Hood's Bay through blizzards and snow drifts, some as deep as 7 feet (2.1 m). This took two hours to achieve using the combined strength of 18 horses and 200 men. When the lifeboat and crew arrived, they launched the boat and spent 90 minutes in effecting a rescue of the people still stranded at sea. All survived and a commemorative plaque now memorialises the rescue in the village of Robin Hood's Bay.

The events of The Visitor prompted the RNLI to re-open the lifeboat station at Robin Hoods Bay (until 1931).

=== SS Rohilla (1914) ===
Rohilla was launched in 1906 for the British India Steam Navigation Company. She was pressed into war service in 1914 as HMHS Rohilla (His Majesties Hospital Ship). Whilst sailing from the Firth of Forth to Dunkirk to evacuate wounded soldiers, she ran aground on Saltwick Nab reef, which is just south of Whitby Harbour. Despite being only a short distance from the shore, high seas and gale force winds created atrocious conditions for any prospect of a rescue from the shore. One of Whitby's RNLI lifeboats Robert and Mary Ellis (ON 588) attempted to close on the wreck but was forced back by the high waves. Another of Whitby's lifeboats the John Fielden (ON 379) was dragged across the rocky scar to a point adjacent to the wrecked ship and made two successful rescues bringing 35 people to the safety of the shore, however the damage to her hull prevented and further attempts.

An audacious plan to haul the Upgang lifeboat William Riley of Birmingham and Leamington (ON 594) overland to opposite the Rohilla and then lower it by hand down the 200-foot (61 m) cliff was successful however the mountainous sea conditions prevented her launch.

A lifeboat from Scarborough was towed to the scene of the tragedy but they too were thwarted by the storm conditions, they did however stay on the scene throughout the night set to make another attempt at first light which was still pushed back and the lifeboat was towed back to Scarborough.

In all, six lifeboats were launched to try and rescue the 234 people on board over the course of three days. During the grounding of the vessel, she broke her back and several attempts were made to safely remove those onboard. In all, 89 people died in the sinking. Of the six lifeboats launched, only two were motorboats, and because of the perilous waves, only one of the motorboats, the Henry Vernon (ON 613) which had travelled down the coast from Tynemouth was able to get close to what remained of the ship rescuing the last 50 souls. This tragedy was one of the pivotal points that was to see the RNLI introduce motor lifeboats spelling the end for the traditional rowing boat.

=== Ruswarp flood (1931) ===
The Whitby Lifeboat was again taken overland to the village of Ruswarp (further upstream of Whitby on the River Esk) in September 1931 due to extreme flooding. The flooding had washed away several bridges and the lifeboat was needed to rescue people from their houses. Despite the narrowness of the walls on the roads and the extreme current, the lifeboat crew (in No. 2 Lifeboat) managed to rescue five people.

=== Admiral Von Tromp (1976) ===
On 30 September 1976, the trawler, Admiral Von Tromp, ran aground on Saltwick Bay rocks, much as the Rohilla had done 62 years earlier. The trawler had set sail from Scarborough the day before and was going fishing in an area some 45 nautical miles (83 km; 52 mi) north-east of Scarborough. Why the boat ran aground some 90 degrees off of her pre-planned course has never been fully explained as the man at the helm of the ship drowned that night. The Whitby Lifeboat was launched and made several attempts to get the men off the stricken boat, but to no avail, even though at one point, the two boats were touching. Eventually, the flooding of the ship led the men to taking to open water from which three were washed ashore, with the skipper of the boat being rescued by the inshore lifeboat from the sea. Two of the trawler men died. At a resultant inquiry, a nautical surveyor stated that even if the boat had been left to its own devices, she would not have been taken upon the rocks by the tide. Two of the RNLI crewmen were awarded RNLI medals, one silver and one bronze, for the mission.

== Station honours ==
The following are awards made at Whitby

- Sea Gallantry Medal – Silver, awarded by H.M. The King

John Robert Harland, crew member – 1946

- RNIPLS Gold Medal

Lt. John Lingard, RN, H.M. Coastguard, Robin Hood's Bay – 1829

Lt. Richard Jones, RN, H.M. Coastguard, Whitby – 1830

Lt. Richard Jones, RN, H.M. Coastguard, Whitby – 1831 (Second-Service award)

Lt. George Sherras Brittain, RN, H.M. Coastguard, Whitby – 1838

- RNLI Gold Medal

Thomas Langlands, Coxswain – 1914

- RNIPLS Silver Medal

Lt. George Sherras Brittain, RN, H.M. Coastguard, Whitby – 1837

John Storr, fisherman of Whitby – 1853

- RNLI Silver Medal

Henry Freeman, crew member – 1861
Thomas Robinson, seaman – 1861

William T. Quigley, Chief Officer, H.M. Coastguard, Whitby – 1868

Henry Freeman, Coxswain – 1880 (Second-Service clasp)

Thomas Langlands, Coxswain Superintendent – 1906

Richard Eglon, Second Coxswain – 1914
George Peart – 1914

John William Storry, Fisherman – 1924

James Murfield, Coxswain – 1939

James Philpot, Motor Mechanic – 1940

John Robert Harland, crew member – 1946

Robert William Allen, Coxswain – 1977

- RNLI Bronze Medal

John Richard Dryden, Second Coxswain – 1939
James Philpot, Mechanic – 1939

James Murfield, Coxswain – 1940
John Richard Dryden, Acting Second Coxswain – 1940 (post.)
Christopher Wale, Acting Bowman – 1940 (post.)
William Dryden, Assistant Mechanic – 1940
Matthew Leadley Winspear, crew member – 1940
John William Cuthbeth Walker, crew member – 1940

Harry Murfield, Coxswain – 1946

Eric Charles Taylor, Coxswain – 1954

William Harland, Coxswain – 1970

Michael Raymond Coates, Helm – 1975

Brian William Hodgson, Helm – 1975

Richard Martin Kildale Robinson, Helm – 1977

Peter Neville Thomson, Coxswain Mechanic – 1988
Nicholas Simon Botham, Helm – 1988

John Pearson, Helm – 1993

- Bronze Medal, awarded by the RSPCA

Carl Welham – 2002

- Medal Service Certificate

R. Pennock – 1970
Peter N. Thomson – 1970
R. Frampton
R. Allen
E. Breckon

David Wharton, crew member – 1975
Barry Mason, crew member – 1975

Michael Raymond Coates, crew member – 1977
Brian William Hodgson, crew member – 1977

B. Snedden – 1988
Glenn Goodberry – 1988
Howard Fields – 1988
P. Sellars – 1988
R. Brooks – 1988
A. Jordan – 1988

- The Maud Smith Award 1946
  (for the bravest act of lifesaving during the year by a member of a lifeboat crew)

John Robert Harland, crew member – 1946

- The Ralph Glister Award 1975
  (for the most meritorious service of the year performed by a rescue boat crew)

The Helm and ILB crew – 1975

- The Ralph Glister Award 1976
  (for the most meritorious service of the year performed by a rescue boat crew)

Richard M. K. Robinson, Helm – 1977
David A. Wharton, crew member – 1977
Tony Easton, crew member – 1977

- Honorary Certificate awarded by the Carnegie Hero Fund Trust

John Robert Dryden – 1940
Norman Russell – 1940

John Robert Harland, crew member – 1946

- Testimonial awarded by the Royal Humane Society

W. Dryden, Mechanic – 1958

- Silk Cut Seamanship Award

Whitby Lifeboat Crew

- The Thanks of the Institution inscribed on Vellum

Five crew members of the Mary Ann Hepworth – 1939

W. Harland, Coxswain – 1966

John Anderson – 1967
Peter Neville Thomas – 1967

David Frampton – 1970
Robert Allen – 1970

D. Wharton, crew member – 1975

Peter N. Thomson, Second Coxswain/Motor Mechanic – 1977
Dennis D. Carrick, Assistant Mechanic – 1977
Howard Bedford, crew member – 1977
Raymond Dent, crew member – 1977
Thomas Hansel, crew member – 1977

David A. Wharton, crew member – 1977
Anthony Easton, crew member – 1977

Michael Coates, Helm – 1977
Brian Hodgson, crew member – 1977
Anthony Easton, crew member – 1977

Peter N. Thomson, Coxswain Mechanic – 1982

Nick Bentley – 1993
Glenn Goodberry (Ronald Rundle Goodberry) – 1993

Keith Elliott, Second Coxswain – 2000

- Vellum Service Certificate

J. White – 2011
S. Boocock – 2011

- A Framed Letter of Thanks signed by the Chairman of the Institution

Peter N. Thomson – 1983
Michael Coates – 1983
Brian Hodgson – 1983
D. Smith – 1983

Peter N. Thomson – 1989

Peter N. Thomson and crew – 1993

Keith Stuart, Coxswain – 2000

John Pearson, Helm – 2003

Whitby Lifeboat Station – 2007

- Framed Letter of Thanks from the Chief of Operations

Peter N. Thomson – 1989

Peter N. Thomson – 1992

J. Pearson – 1996
Michael Russell – 1996
Carl Welham – 1996
A. Morley – 1996

Hugh Ramsden, Helm – 2011

- A Collective Letter of Thanks signed by the Chairman of the Institution

Peter N. Thomson, Coxswain Mechanic – 1993
Keith Stuart, Second Coxswain Assistant Mechanic – 1993
Michael Russell, crew member – 1993
Nicholas Botham, crew member – 1993
Adrian Blackburn, crew member – 1993
Howard Fields, crew member – 1993

Daniel Wordsworth, lifeguard – 2011
Calum Norman – 2011

- Member, Order of the British Empire (MBE)

Peter Neville Thomson – 1993

- British Empire Medal

Neil Andrew Williamson, Curator, RNLI Whitby Lifeboat Museum and Launching Authority – 2024KBH

== Roll of honour ==
In memory of those lost whilst serving Whitby lifeboat.

Lost when the East Side lifeboat capsized whilst on service, 6 October 1841

J. Pattinson
R. Storr
R. Walker
J. Wilson

- Lost when the lifeboat capsized on her sixth service of the day, 9 February 1861

C. Collins
J. Dixon
I. Dobson
R. Harland
M. Leadley
R. Leadley

G. Martin
H. Philpot
J. Storr
W. Storr
W. Tyreman
W. Walker

- Drowned when the lifeboat Harriett Forteath capsized, on service to the schooner Agenoria, 9 January 1877

Samuel Lacey, Coxswain (48)
Richard Gatenby, crew member
John Thompson, crew member (28)

- Collapsed and died whilst on lifeboat exercise, 8 August 1881

James Pounder, Second Coxswain (45)

- Died after being run-over by the lifeboat carriage wheel, being launched for demonstration on Whitby RNLI Flag Day, 16 August 1924

James Harland, Shore Signalman (37)

- Washed overboard from RNLB Mary Ann Hepworth and drowned, whilst on service to the Belgian vessel Charles, 3 February 1940

John Richard Dryden, Acting Second Coxswain (61)
Christopher Wale, Acting Bowman (61)

- Died in 1955, after forced retirement from head injuries received whilst launching the lifeboat 17 years earlier, 16 May 1938.

David Harland, Former Coxswain (61)

== Whitby lifeboats ==
=== No.1 Station ===
ON (Note: ON is the RNLI's Official Number of the boat.)	Name	Built	On station	Class	Comments
–	Unnamed	1802	1802–1817	Greathead	(Note: 30-foot (10-oared) non-self-righting lifeboat, built by Henry Greathead of South Shields, costing £160.)
–	"West Side Lifeboat"	1822	1822–1859	26-foot 6in North Country	(Note: 26-foot 6in x 9-foot 3in (10-oared) North Country non-self-righting lifeboat, built by Wake of Sunderland, costing £100.); Later in service with Whitby fishermen (1861–1889)
–	Unnamed	1860	1860–1861	30-foot North Country	(Note: 30-foot x 8-foot 9in North Country non-self-righting lifeboat, built by Francis Falkingbridge of Whitby.); Given to Whitby fishermen, renamed Fishermens Friend, condemned 1872.
Pre-383	Lucy	1861	1861–1870	32-foot Peake Self-righting (P&S)	(Note: 32-foot x 7-foot 10in Peake-class self-righting (P&S) lifeboat, legacy of Mr A. W. Jaffray of London, built by Forrestt of Limehouse, London, costing £196.)
Pre-538	Lucy	1869	1870–1871	32-foot Prowse Self-righting (P&S)	(Note: 32-foot x 7-foot 7in Prowse-class self-righting (P&S) lifeboat, built by Forrestt of Limehouse, London, costing £248.); Renamed Robert Whitworth in 1871
Pre-538	Robert Whitworth	1869	1871–1881	32-foot Prowse Self-righting (P&S)	Renamed Harriett Forteath, at Whitby No. 2 Station in 1881.
180	Robert and Mary Ellis	1881	1881–1908	34-foot Self-righting (P&S)	(Note: 34-foot x 8-foot (10-oared) self-righting (P&S) lifeboat, legacy of Miss M. A. Ellis of Moorgate, Yorkshire, built by Woolfe of Shadwell, London, costing £363.)
588	Robert and Mary Ellis	1908	1908–1934	35-foot Self-righting (P&S)	(Note: 35-foot x 8-foot 6in (10-oared) self-righting (P&S) lifeboat, gift of the late Mrs Ellis of Harrogate, built by Thames Ironworks of Blackwall, London, costing £887.)

Station Closed, 1934
Pre ON numbers are unofficial numbers used by the Lifeboat Enthusiast Society to reference early lifeboats not included on the official RNLI list.

=== No.2 Station ===
ON	Name	Built	On station	Class	Comments
Pre-082	"East Side Lifeboat"	1822	1822–1863	26-foot North Country	(Note: 26-foot 6in x 9-foot 3in (10-oared) North Country non-self-righting lifeboat, built by Christopher Gale of Whitby.); Named Petrel in 1863.
Pre-082	Petrel	1822	1863–1871	26-foot North Country	Renamed Gertrude in 1871.
Pre-082	Gertrude	1822	1871–1872	26-foot North Country	
Pre-413	Harriott Forteath	1864	1872–1880	30-foot Self-righting (P&S)	(Note: 30-foot x 7-foot 3in (8-oared) self-righting (P&S) lifeboat, legacy of Miss Forteath of Nottingham, built by Forrestt of Limehouse, London, costing £216 when new.); Previously Dorinda and Barbara at Theddlethorpe.
Pre-464	Harriott Forteath	1866	1880–1881	32-foot Self-righting (P&S)	(Note: 32-foot x 7-foot 6in (10-oared) self-righting (P&S) lifeboat, legacy of Miss Forteath of Nottingham, built by Forrestt of Limehouse, London, costing £242 when new.); Previously Civil Service at Wexford.
Pre-538	Harriott Forteath	1869	1881–1887	32-foot Self-righting (P&S)	(Note: 34-foot x 7-foot 6in (10-oared) self-righting (P&S) lifeboat, an anonymous gift, built by Forrestt of Limehouse, London, costing £325.); Previously Robert Whitworth at Whitby No.1
114	Christopher	1887	1887–1895	34-foot Self-righting (P&S)	(Note: 34-foot x 7-foot 6in (10-oared) self-righting (P&S) lifeboat, an anonymous gift, built by Forrestt of Limehouse, London, costing £325.)
379	John Fielden	1895	1895–1914	34-foot Self-righting (P&S)	(Note: 34-foot x 7-foot 9in (10-oared) self-righting (P&S) lifeboat, gift of Mr J. A. Fielden of London, built by Waterman of Cremyll, Cornwall, costing £305.); Damaged beyond repair during the SS Rohilla rescue effort. Despite rescuing several people, the John Fielden broke in two on the rocks of Saltwick Nab.
455	Forester	1900	1914–1919	34-foot Rubie Self-righting (P&S)	(Note: 34-foot x 8-foot (10-oared) Dungeness-class (Rubie) self-righting (P&S) lifeboat, gift of the Ancient Order of Foresters, built by Thames Ironworks of Blackwall, London, costing £712.); Reserve lifeboat No.4, previously at Tynemouth.
594	William Riley of Birmingham and Leamington	1909	1919–1931	34-foot Rubie Self-righting (P&S)	(Note: 34-foot x 8-foot (10-oared) Dungeness-class (Rubie) self-righting (P&S) lifeboat, legacy of Mr Riley of Leamington, built by Thames Ironworks of Blackwall, London, costing £722.); Previously at Upgang, but allocated to Whitby after only two rescues. Fully restored, used for display purposes. On 4 March 2024, the boat was displayed alongside a brand new Shannon-class lifeboat, outside Westminster Abbey at the RNLI 200 service.
580	Jacob and Rachel Vallentine	1907	1931–1938	34-foot Rubie Self-righting (P&S)	(Note: 34-foot x 8-foot (10-oared) Dungeness-class (Rubie) self-righting (P&S) lifeboat, legacy of Mr S. Vallentine of Brixton, built by Thames Ironworks of Blackwall, London, costing £730.); Previously at Happisburgh and Palling.
522	Jacob and Rachel Vallentine	1904	1938–1947	34-foot Rubie Self-righting (P&S)	(Note: 34-foot x 8-foot (10-oared) Dungeness-class (Rubie) self-righting (P&S) lifeboat, legacy of Mr S. Vallentine of Brixton, built by Thames Ironworks of Blackwall, London, costing £665 when new.); Previously Richard at Donna Nook.
669	Robert and Ellen Robson	1918	1947–1957	34-foot Rubie Self-righting (P&S)	(Note: 34-foot x 8-foot (10-oared) Dungeness-class (Rubie) self-righting (P&S) lifeboat, legacy of Mr R. Robson, built by S. E. Saunders of Cowes, costing £966 when new.); Previously at Tramore and Aberdeen.

Station Closed, 1957

=== Upgang Station (1865–1919) ===
For lifeboats stationed at Upgang, please see Upgang Lifeboat Station

=== Motor lifeboats ===
ON	Op. No. (Note: Op. No. is the RNLI's Operational Number of the boat carried on the hull.)	Name	Built	On station	Class	Comments
667	–	Margaret Harker-Smith	1918	1919–1938	40-foot Self-righting (motor)	(Note: 40-foot x 10-foot 6in self-righting (motor) lifeboat, legacy of Miss M. H. Smith, built by S. E. Saunders of Cowes, costing £5,023.)
808	–	Mary Ann Hepworth	1938	1938–1974	41-foot Watson	Sold 1974. Later used as a pleasure cruiser on the River Esk.
1033	44-012	The White Rose of Yorkshire	1974	1974–1988	Waveney	Transferred to Invergordon in 1988.
1131	47-023	City of Sheffield	1988	1988–1996	Tyne	
1212	14-14	George and Mary Webb	1995	1996–2023	Trent	
1356	13-49	Lois Ivan	2023	2023–	Shannon	Arrived on station 11 June 2023.

=== Inshore lifeboats ===
Op. No.	Name	On station	Class	Comments
D-84	Unnamed	1966–1970	D-class (RFD PB16)	
D-193	Unnamed	1971–1977	D-class (RFD PB16)	
D-260	Gwynaeth	1977–1987	D-class (Zodiac III)	
D-369	Unnamed	1988–1997	D-class (EA16)	
D-521	OEM Stone II	1997–2007	D-class (EA16)	
D-503	Criddy and Tom	2005–2007	D-class (EA16)	
D-512	Jane Ann II	2007	D-class (EA16)	
D-674	OEM Stone III	2007–2017	D-class (IB1)	Named by The Duchess of Kent at the re-opening of Whitby's new lifeboat station in 2007.
D-810	Warter Priory	2017–	D-class (IB1)	

== See also ==
- List of RNLI stations
- List of former RNLI stations
- Royal National Lifeboat Institution lifeboats
