= Upgang Lifeboat Station =

Former RNLI lifeboat station in North Yorkshire, England

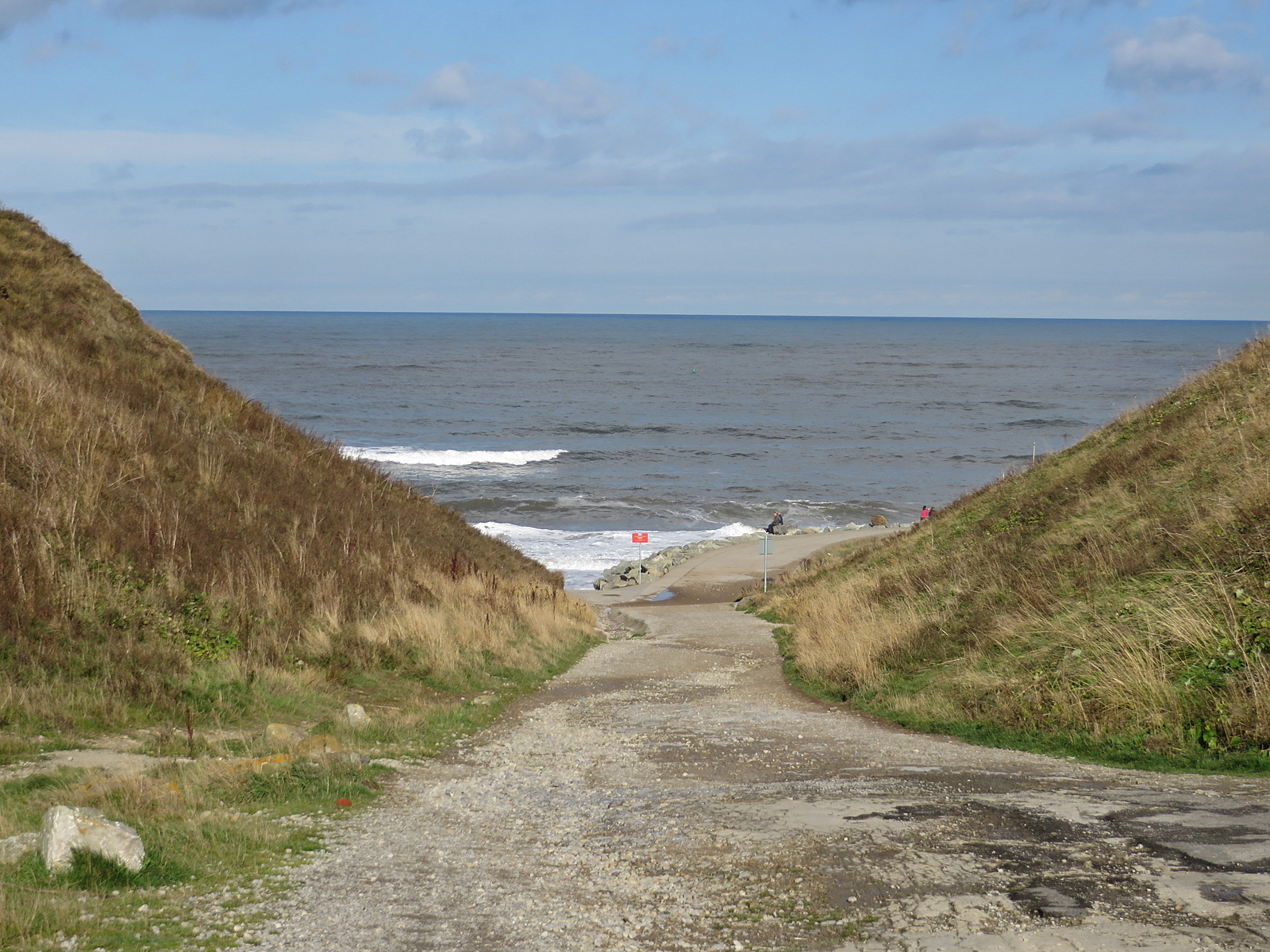
- Former location of Upgang Lifeboat House

- Upgang, Whitby, North Yorkshire

General information
- Status: Closed
- Type: RNLI Lifeboat Station
- Location: Upgang, Whitby, North Yorkshire, England
- Coordinates: 54°29′42.6″N 0°38′24.8″W
- Opened: 1865
- Closed: 1919

Upgang Lifeboat Station was located just over 1 mile (1.6 km) west of Whitby Harbour, midway between Whitby and Sandsend, on the coast of North Yorkshire.

A lifeboat was first stationed at Upgang by the Royal National Lifeboat Institution (RNLI) in 1865, effectively a No.3 station for Whitby Lifeboat Station.

Following the placement of a motor-lifeboat at Whitby, Upgang lifeboat station was closed in 1919.

== History ==
In conditions of a northerly gale, launching either of the Whitby lifeboats was proving extremely difficult. In August 1864, a request was made of the RNLI to station an extra lifeboat further along the coast, to the west of Whitby. The station would be managed by the Whitby committee, and when required, launched with the crew from Whitby. Costing £220-16s-0d, a boathouse was constructed by Robinson and Smales at the tiny hamlet of Upgang, a place that has long since disappeared off the map. A 30-foot Self-righting 'Pulling and Sailing' (P&S) lifeboat, built by Forrestt of Limehouse, and previously at Penzance, was delivered to Whitby, arriving on 4 July 1865. Funds were appropriated from a gift from Dr. H. W. Watson of Derby, and the boat was named William Watson.

In 1878, the Institution received £600, the legacy of the late Mrs Ann Elizabeth Sykes of Grasmere, for a lifeboat to be named in memory of her late son Lt. Joseph Sykes, who had once been rescued from HMS Alceste (1806), when it was wrecked in 1817. William Watson was renamed Joseph Sykes.

When the 20-year old lifeboat was retired the following year in 1879, after 14 years at Upgang, it had never been called out on service. The new boat arriving at Upgang in 1879, was a 32-foot Self-righting boat, costing £282. Again funded from the legacy of Mrs Sykes, it would retain the name Joseph Sykes.

On 15 January 1881, the Upgang lifeboat would finally be called upon, but the outcome was not good. Along with Whitby lifeboat Robert Whitworth, she went to the aid of the brig Lumley, on passage from the River Tyne to Motril, Spain, and now stranded on rocks approximately 1 mile (1.6 km) off Upgang. Despite great effort and many attempts by both lifeboat crews, neither was able to effect a rescue, and all 10 crew aboard the Lumley perished.

The Joseph Sykes was transferred to Rhosneigr in 1885. The boat had been launched just twice on service, with no lives saved. In her place, Upgang would receive another 32-foot Self-righting lifeboat, built by Woolfe of Shadwell, previously on service at Bamburgh Castle as the John and Betty Cuttell (ON 184). The boat would be renamed Joseph Sykes (ON 184). Very much like her predecessors, there was little demand for the lifeboat, and she too would not be called in the following five years on service.

1890 saw yet another replacement lifeboat for Upgang. This was a slightly larger 34-foot Self-righting (P&S) lifeboat, constructed by Watkins & Co. at £414. Provided by an anonymous donor, the boat was named Upgang (ON 298). She would come to be launched six times on service, and save 8 lives.

Upgang was launched for the first time on service on 18 November 1893, to the steamship Southwark, but as the lifeboatmen battled the seas to reach the wreck, all 13 crew were rescued by the Rocket Brigade. Launched to the schooner Maria on 11 June 1899, the lifeboat would finally record its first life saved, in fact rescuing the three crewmen, and recovering the vessel to Whitby harbour. Five crew members of the steamship Ben Corlic were saved on 31 May 1902, when the vessel ran aground on the Upgang rocks.

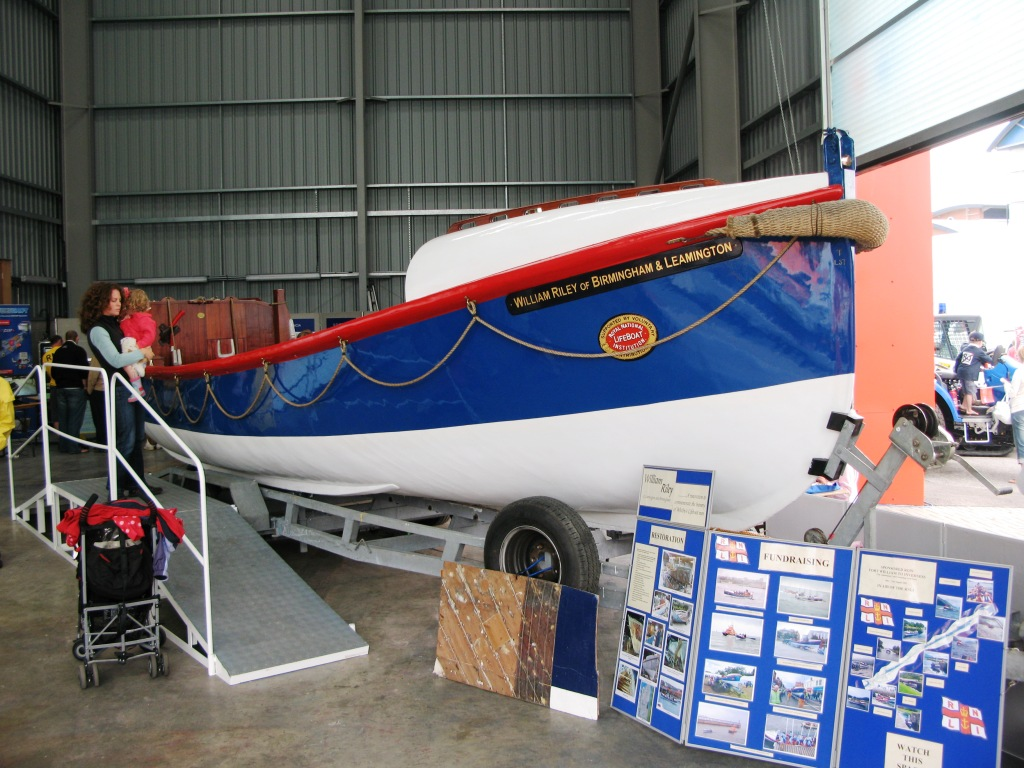
William Riley of Birmingham and Leamington (ON 594)

The final boat to be placed at Upgang was the William Riley of Birmingham and Leamington (ON 594), in 1909. A 34-foot Dungeness-class (or Rubie) lifeboat, built by Thames Ironworks.

One of only two calls made on the William Riley of Birmingham and Leamington, was on Friday 30 October 1914, to the 7,400 ton hospital ship SS Rohilla, which ran onto rocks off Saltwick Nab to the east of Whitby in terrible conditions, with 229 people on board. Much has been documented about the rescue efforts over several days, involving lifeboats from Whitby, Scarborough, Tynemouth and Upgang. The Upgang lifeboat was transported to Saltwick, and lowered down the cliff on ropes, but the conditions were too bad to launch. On Saturday, the crew rowed for an hour, but couldn't get close, returning exhausted. Finally, other boats managed to rescue 145 of the 229 people on board. For their efforts, Coxswain Robinson and Second Coxswain Kelly were awarded 'The Thanks of the Institution inscribed on Vellum'.

With the motor-powered lifeboat Margaret Harker-Smith (ON 667) being placed in service at Whitby, as required following the SS Rohilla incident, it was decided that the lifeboat at Upgang was no longer required, but the William Riley of Birmingham and Leamington (ON 594) was transferred to be the Whitby No.2 lifeboat, serving until 1931.

The Upgang Lifeboat Station was closed in 1919. No evidence remains of the Upgang boathouse. Upgang lifeboat had been launched just 11 times in 54 years, saving 9 lives.

Sold from service in 1931, the William Riley of Birmingham and Leamington (ON 594) was re-discovered in 2005, in a neglected state. Restoration was carried out, with the boat now used for display purposes. On 4 March 2024, William Riley of Birmingham and Leamington was taken to London, and displayed alongside a brand new Shannon-class lifeboat, outside Westminster Abbey at the RNLI 200 service.

== Station honours ==
The following are awards made at Upgang.

- The Thanks of the Institution inscribed on Vellum

Robinson 'Pounder' Robinson, Coxswain – 1914
T. Kelly, Second Coxswain – 1914

== Upgang lifeboats ==
=== Pulling and Sailing (P&S) lifeboats ===
ON (Note: ON is the RNLI's Official Number of the boat.)	Name	Built	On station	Class	Comments
Pre-359	William Watson	1860	1865–1878	30-foot Peake Self-righting (P&S)	(Note: 30-foot x 7-foot 4in (10-oared) Peake-class self-righting (P&S) lifeboat, gift of Dr H. W. Watson of Derby, built by Forrestt of Limehouse, London, costing £153 when new.); Previously Alexandra at Penzance. Renamed Joseph Sykes in 1878.
Pre-359	Joseph Sykes	1860	1878–1879	30-foot Peake Self-righting (P&S)	(Note: Legacy of Mrs A. E Sykes of How Grasmere.)
Pre-641	Joseph Sykes	1879	1879–1885	32-foot Prowse Self-righting (P&S)	(Note: 32-foot x 7-foot 6in (10-oared) Prowse-class self-righting (P&S) lifeboat, legacy of Mrs A. E Sykes of How Grasmere, built by Woolfe of Shadwell, London, costing £282.)
184	Joseph Sykes	1882	1885–1890	32-foot Prowse Self-righting (P&S)	(Note: 32-foot x 7-foot 6in (10-oared) Prowse-class self-righting (P&S) lifeboat, legacy of Mrs A. E Sykes of How Grasmere, built by Woolfe of Shadwell, London, costing £282 when new.); Previously at Bamburgh Castle
298	Upgang	1890	1890–1908	34-foot Self-righting (P&S)	(Note: 34-foot x 7-foot 6in (10-oared) self-righting (P&S) lifeboat, an anonymous gift, built by Watkins & Co. of Blackwall, London, costing £414.)
275	James and Caroline	1889	1908–1909	34-foot Self-righting (P&S)	(Note: 34-foot x 7-foot 6in (10-oared) self-righting (P&S) lifeboat, legacy of Mr J. Goss of Stratford Green, Woolfe of Shadwell, London, costing £460 when new.); Reserve lifeboat No 7, previously at St Agnes (IOS).
594	William Riley of Birmingham and Leamington	1909	1909–1919	34-foot Dungeness Self-righting (P&S)	(Note: 34-foot x 8-foot (10-oared) Dungeness-class (Rubie) self-righting (P&S) lifeboat, legacy of Mr Riley of Leamington, built by Thames Ironworks, of Blackwall, London, costing £722.)

Pre ON numbers are unofficial numbers used by the Lifeboat Enthusiast Society to reference early lifeboats not included on the official RNLI list.

== See also ==
- List of RNLI stations
- List of former RNLI stations
- Royal National Lifeboat Institution lifeboats
