= Thomas Chaloner (courtier) =

English courtier (1559–1615)

Sir Thomas Chaloner (1559 – 17 November 1615) was an English courtier and Governor of the Courtly College for the household of Prince Henry, son of James I. He was also responsible for introducing alum manufacturing to England. He was member of parliament for St Mawes in 1586 and for Lostwithiel in 1604. His third son was the Regicide Parliamentarian Thomas Chaloner. He is sometimes confused with his cousin Thomas Chaloner, a naturalist who prospected for alum.

== Elizabethan period ==
Chaloner was the illegitimate son of statesman and poet Sir Thomas Chaloner, and Ethelreda Frodsham; his father died in 1565, and his mother then married Edward Brocket (son of Sir John Brocket, knt., of Wheathampstead, Hertfordshire). He owed his education mainly to his father's friend, William Cecil, Lord Burghley, at St Paul's School, London and at Magdalen College, Oxford, where he was noted for his poetical abilities, but took no degree.

In 1579, Chaloner wrote the dedication to Lord Burghley of his father's poetical works. He began his travels in 1580, and became, especially in Italy, intimate with the learned men of the time. He returned home three years after to become a favourite at court, and married Elizabeth, daughter of his father's friend, William Fleetwood, then Recorder of London. Her sister married Sir David Foulis, 1st Baronet.

He was M.P. for St Mawes in 1586 and for Lostwithiel in 1604. In 1588, he taught, at Christ Church, Oxford, Robert Dudley, son of Robert, Earl of Leicester, and was knighted while serving with the English army in France in 1591. In 1592, Chaloner was made justice of the peace for Buckinghamshire. In 1596–7 he was again abroad, and his letters, chiefly from Florence, to the Earl of Essex and Anthony Bacon are in the Lambeth Library.

== Alum manufacture ==
After the dissolution of the monasteries by Henry VIII, in 1540, the lands of Gisborough Priory were given to Thomas's father. At the end of the 16th century, Chaloner travelled to Italy and visited the alum works in the Papal States. Alum was a very important product at that time, used internationally, in curing leather, fixing dyed cloths and for medicinal uses. Up to this period the Vatican, and Spain, two countries in conflict with England, had maintained virtual monopolies on the production and sale of the product.

A cousin of his, also named Thomas Chaloner (son of John Chaloner, Irish Secretary of State), prospected for copper and alum in Ireland, and in 1584 published A Short Discourse of the most rare Vertue of Nitre (Gerald Dewes, London), a practical work in advance of the age. Having a great interest in the study of plants, he recognised that certain plants grew wherever the minerals responsible for the formation of alum were present in the soil. From this he recognised that the rock from which the alum was made was similar to that abundant in several areas in and around his cousin's Guisborough estate, in present day Redcar and Cleveland. In 1606 and 1607, Thomas went into partnership with David Foulis and with Lord Sheffield and John Bourchier, obtaining a monopoly for 31 years of manufacture in northern England.

In time an industry developed, but the tradition that Chaloner secretly brought some of the Pope's workmen to England for this purpose may be unfounded. Once the alum industry around Whitby had taken root, the English Crown imposed its own monopoly – imports from abroad were banned. Although the methods were laborious, England became self-sufficient in alum. In James I's time Chaloner's works suffered from acute unprofitability, frequent changes of management and claims of corrupt dealing. The king prohibited the importation of foreign alum. Under Charles I the crown claimed them as royal mines, and they were granted to Sir Paul Pindar for £12,500 a year to the king and £2,240 to Edmund, Earl of Mulgrave and another, and after paying eight hundred workmen still produced an immense profit.

== Jacobean period ==
Towards the end of Elizabeth's reign, at the instance of Sir Robert Cecil, afterwards Earl of Salisbury, Chaloner went into Scotland, where he became so great a favourite with King James VI of Scotland that even Sir Francis Bacon sought his recommendation. He wrote to Chancellor Egerton that he was with James VI eight days before the death of Elizabeth I, advising on the government to be established at the Union of the Crowns when she died.

Chaloner attended James on his journey to take possession of the English throne, and on the arrival at York headed the deputation to the mayor. Queen Anne gave him the management of her private estate, and the king appointed him governor of the king's eldest son Prince Henry in 1603. Chaloner discussed with Robert, Lord Sidney a plan to extend the park of Nonsuch Palace for the convenience of the queen. King James would exchange another property with the landowner Lord Lumley. Chaloner wrote to Sidney that his son would be welcome in the Prince's household and he would take good care of him.

Chaloner was to form the household into what the king called "a courtly college", and no gentleman could take the prince out without his consent. For his services as the head official of the 420 servants of the prince his "wages and diet" were £66 13s. 4d. a year. In 1605 he attended the prince to Oxford – Magdalen College being chosen out of respect to him – and there, along with forty-two noblemen, gentlemen, and esquires, he was made a Master of Arts.

In 1605, Chaloner was entrusted with the repairs of Kenilworth Castle, the planting of gardens, restoration of fish-ponds, game preserves, etc. In 1607, he and a Dane and two Dutchmen showed "rare fireworks" on the occasion of a Twelfth-night masque at court.

In 1610, when the young prince was created Prince of Wales and Duke of Cornwall, and Chaloner was made his chamberlain, the scheme of M. Villeforest to extract silver from lead was entrusted by the prince to him and Sir William Godolphin for trial. In 1608, he recommended the making of water-pipes of earthenware, of which he asserted eight thousand could be made in a day, safer and stronger than metal ones. On Phineas Pett's trial for insufficiency as a shipwright, the king chose Chaloner to make the experiments on the powers and capacities of ships. The royal New-year's gifts to him were of high value. In 1605 his portion was 30 oz. of gilt plate, and at the christening of one of his children he received from Prince Henry "168 oz. of gilt plate of all kinds" made by the King's goldsmith John Williams. The public records mention a few grants to him: in 1604, £100 a year in lands of the duchy of Lancaster and £36 a year in fee-farm of exchequer lands; and subsequently part of the manor of Clothall, Hertfordshire.

== Death and legacy ==
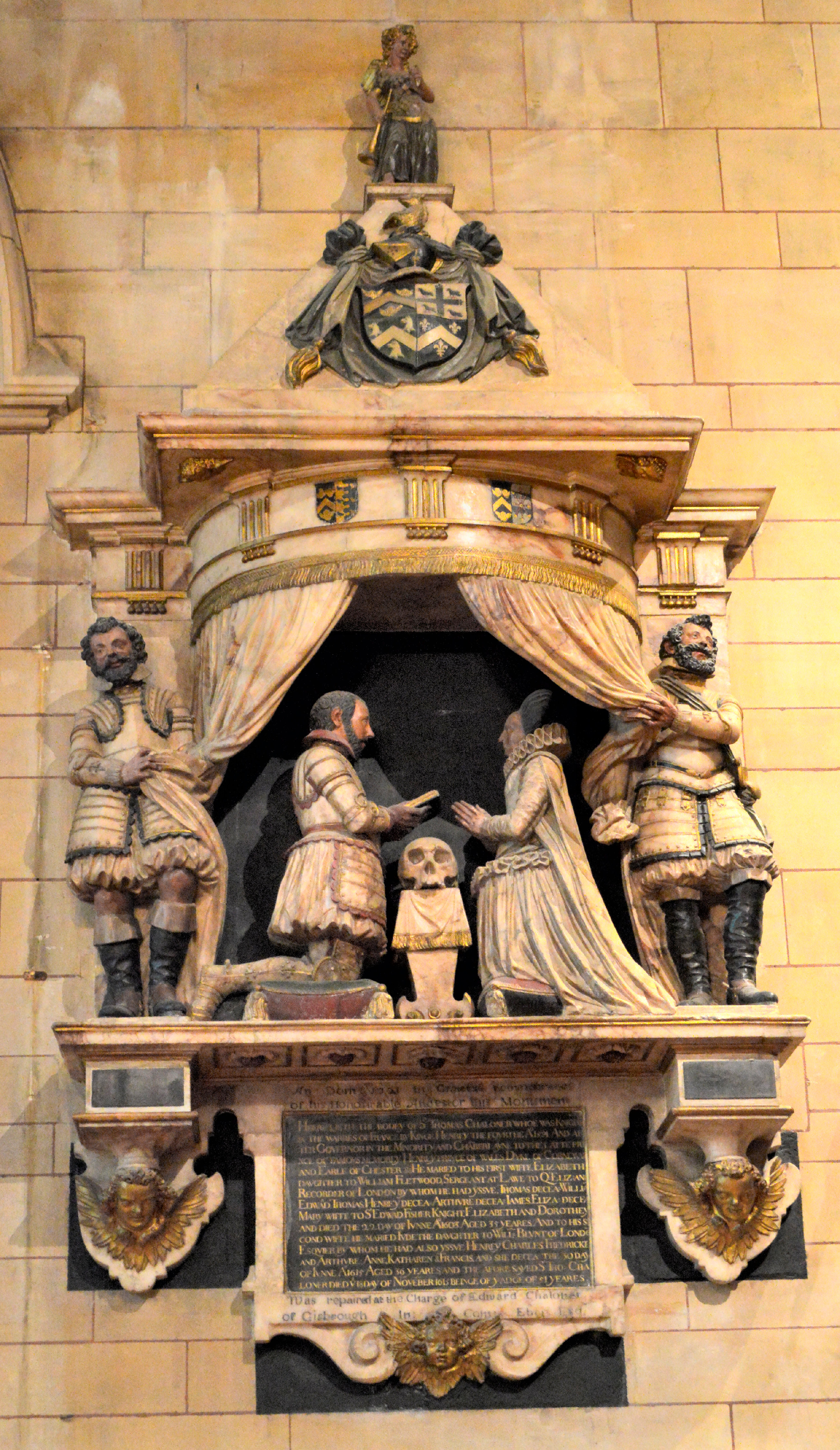
St Nicholas Church, Chiswick

Chaloner died on 17 November 1615. He left estates at Guisborough, Yorkshire, and Steeple Claydon, Buckinghamshire. In the chancel of St. Nicholas Church, Chiswick, Middlesex, is a monument of alabaster having his effigies and his lady's, with an inscribed plate. This monument places his birth in 1561, and not 1559 as in Wood and Tanner.

John Owen addressed one of his "Epigrams" to Chaloner; and Isaac Wake, in his Rex Platonicus, Oxford, 1607, has a poem on him. Chaloner was a great benefactor to the grammar school of St. Bees, giving it in 1608 a good building site, with timber, stone, and forty tons of sea coal, with an acre and a half of adjoining land and there were two Chaloner scholarships still existing in 1890.

== Family ==
By his first wife, who died in 1603, he had 11 children, including William, who was created a baronet on 20 July 1620 and died unmarried at Scanderoon (İskenderun) in Turkey in 1681 (making his title extinct); Edward; the regicides Thomas and James, and; three other sons and four daughters. Chaloner's second wife, Judith née Blunt (died 1615; a daughter of William Blunt of London), was the mother of four sons and three daughters.
