= St Agnes Lifeboat Station, Isles of Scilly =

RNLI Lifeboat station on the Isles of Scilly

St Agnes Lifeboat Station Isles of Scilly

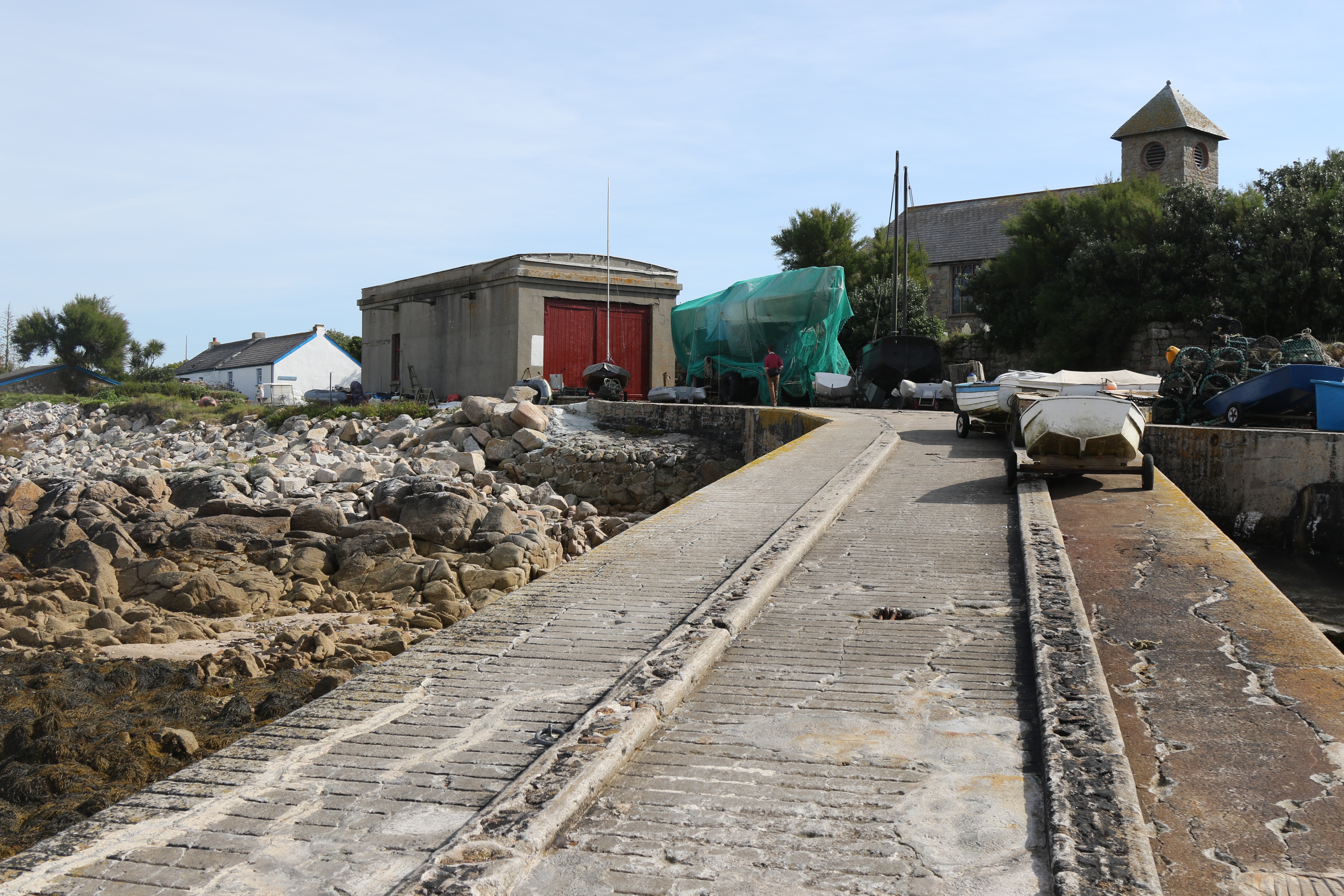
- Former St Agnes lifeboat station and slipway

- Location within Isles of Scilly

General information
- Type: RNLI Lifeboat Station
- Location: Periglis Quay, St Agnes, Isles of Scilly, TR22 0PL, UK
- Coordinates: 49°53′36.5″N 6°20′58.3″W
- Opened: 28 August 1890
- Closed: 1920

St Agnes Lifeboat Station was located at Periglis Quay, within sight of the Bishop Rock Lighthouse, on the west coast of the island of St Agnes, one of the Isles of Scilly, an archipelago off the south-west coast of the county of Cornwall, England.

A lifeboat station was established at St Agnes in 1890, by the Royal National Lifeboat Institution (RNLI).

After operating for 30 years, St Agnes Lifeboat Station closed in 1920.

== History ==
Having read the report of the Deputy Inspector of Lifeboats, following his visit to the island, at a meeting of the RNLI committee of management on 9 May 1889, it was agreed to establish a new station at St Agnes, "it being considered very desirable to place a second Life-boat on the Scilly Islands."

A new 34-foot-long (10 m) self-righting 'Pulling and Sailing' (P&S) lifeboat, one with sails and (10) oars, fitted with a sliding keel, and two water-ballast tanks, was constructed by Woolfe of Shadwell, London, at a cost of £460.

A boathouse and slipway was constructed at Periglis Bay, on a site provided by landowner Thomas Algernon Dorien-Smith, at a cost of £988-18s-2d. Unlike the majority of the stone-built boathouses of the period, the RNLI seems to have adopted a more utilitarian design for this boathouse, with a very plain box-like boathouse appearing to be constructed of concrete. A similar one, built in 1892, still exists at Culdaff, County Donegal, in Ireland.

A legacy from Mr James Goss of Stratford Green part funded the cost of the new station. After being transported to the island along with a launching carriage, at an inauguration ceremony held on 28 August 1890, Mrs. Dorrien-Smith, wife of the president of the branch, named the new lifeboat James and Caroline (ON 275).

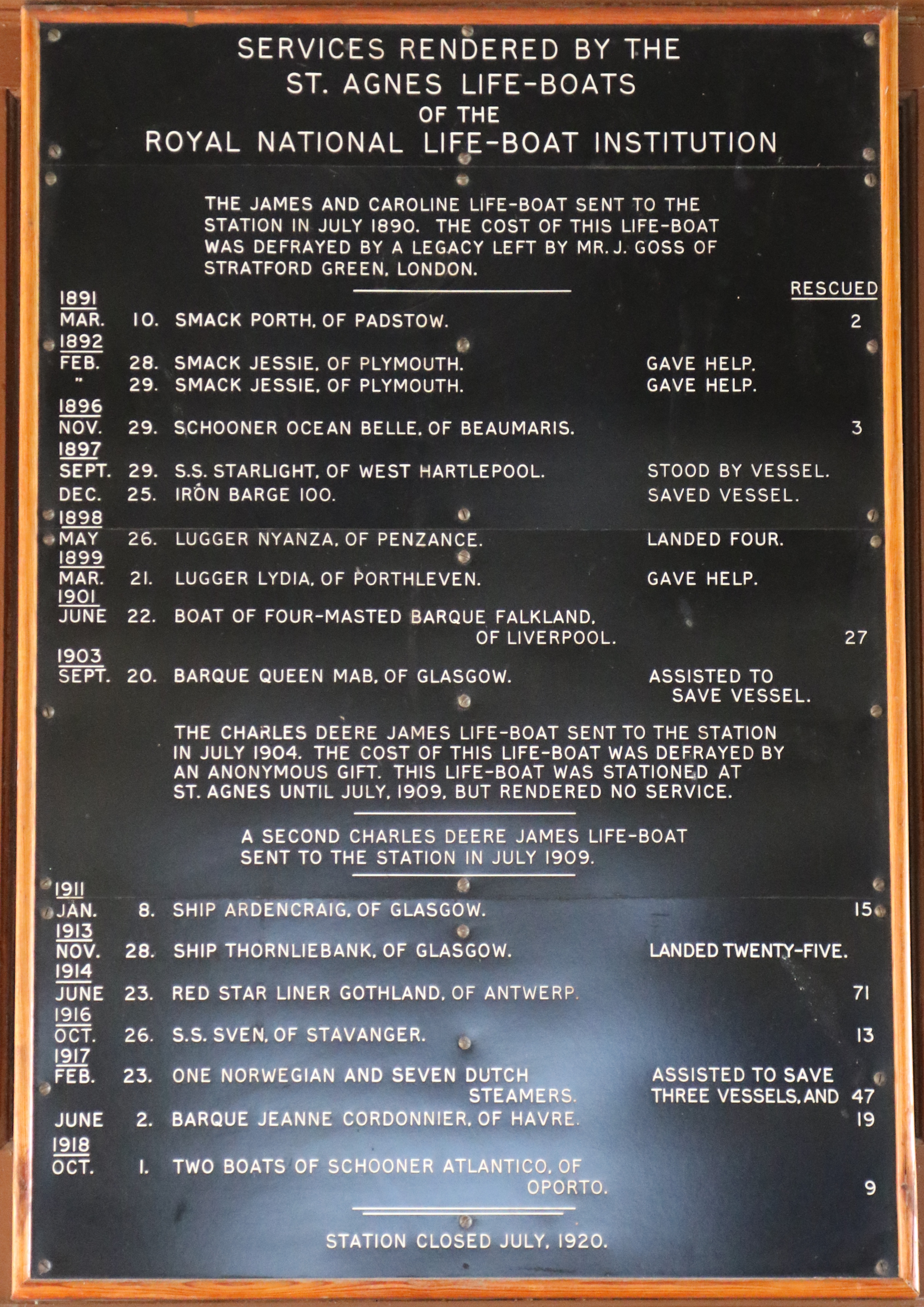
St Agnes Lifeboat Service Board, preserved at St Agnes Church, New Lane

The station opened in 1890 with a single slipway. A new slipway was provided in 1904, at a cost of £5,000 (equivalent to £526,000 in 2025) to the designs of the Institution's Architect, W.T. Douglass. From the back of the boat house to the toe of the slip it was 1,068 feet (326 m). It was built of Jarrah wood from Western Australia, bolted to granite and concrete pillars, with the exception of a short piece at the upper end, built on the rocks. Two rails ran the entire length of the slip, on which rested the double bogey trolley that carried the boat. Rails were also laid down the old slip which could be used at high tide.

On 22 June 1901, the four-masted barque, Falkland, of Liverpool, on passage to Falmouth from Tacoma with a cargo of wheat, was driven onto Bishop Rock. The Captain and five crew were lost, when the boat sank suddenly, but 27 people, including the Captain's wife and baby, had been put off on the ships boat, which was recovered by the St Agnes lifeboat and towed to St Mary's.

In dense fog on 8 January 1911, the sailing ship Ardencraig of Glasgow, on passage from Melbourne with a cargo of wheat, was holed when she ran aground on the Isles of Scilly. 31 crew took to lifeboats. St Agnes lifeboat was credited with the rescue of 15.

The St Agnes lifeboat played a very important role during World War I, rescuing crew from vessels torpedoed or shot by German submarines:

- 24 October 1916, Sola of Stavanger, rescued 13 from the ship's lifeboat.
- 22 February 1917, One Norwegian and seven Dutch Steamships, rescued 47 from three lifeboats.
- 13 March 1917, Algonquin of New York, 26 rescued from two lifeboats
- 2 June 1917, Jeanne Cordonnier of Le Havre, rescued 19 from the ship's lifeboat.
- 1 October 1918, Atlantico of Porto, rescued nine men from two lifeboats.

Medals were awarded to each of the St Agnes crew, by the League of Neutral Countries, Haarlem, for the rescue of the crew of the Dutch steamers.

In 1920, with a decline in the number of available crew, and a motor-lifeboat placed at St Mary's in 1919, after 30-years of operation, it was decided to close St Agnes Lifeboat Station. During that time, the lifeboat had launched 34 times, and saved 206 lives.

The lifeboat station and slipway still exist, and have been identified by the Isles of Scilly council as a "Building of Local Significance".

== Thomas W. Lawson ==
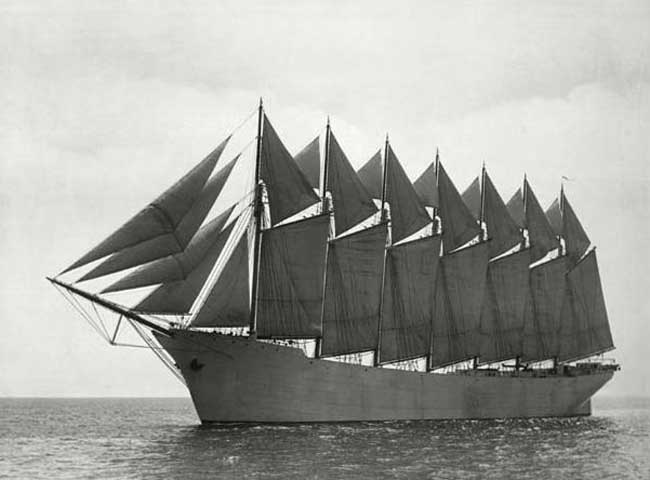
Schooner Thomas W. Lawson

On 13 December 1907, after a troubled passage across the Atlantic Ocean in poor weather, the Thomas W Lawson of Boston, a seven-masted steel schooner, took shelter at Minmanueth from a storm. The vessel was on passage to England, with a cargo of 58,000 barrels (6000 tons) of paraffin oil. Both the St Mary's and St Agnes lifeboats attended the vessel, but the Master refused their request to abandon ship. St Agnes lifeboat man William Thomas Hicks went aboard, to act as pilot. Attempting to get close, the St Mary's boat struck the stern of the vessel, damaging a mast, and returned home for repairs. A crew member aboard the St Agnes boat suffered a heart attack, and that boat also returned home.

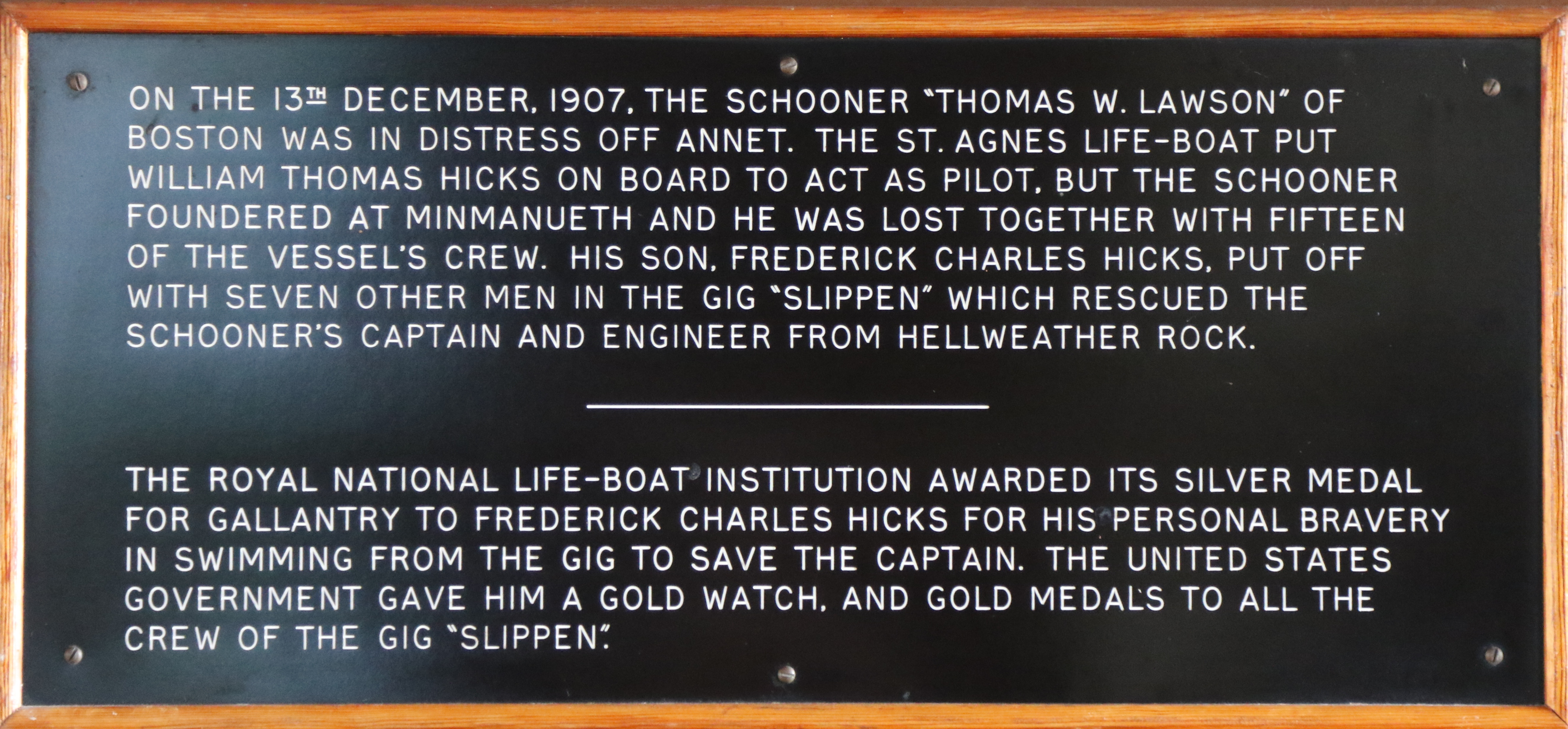
Thomas W Lawson Service Board, preserved at St Agnes Church, New Lane

During the night, the weather worsened, with the vessel breaking from its anchors and capsizing. The following day, both lifeboats returned to the vessel, only to find a mass of wreckage and debris. The event is regarded as the first major oil spill. All seven masts had broken off, taking with them most of the crew, who had been lashed in the rigging. Those who survived the fall drowned in the breaking waves and oil. George Allen was found on Annet island, but died soon afterwards. William Thomas Hicks had been washed off the boat and was lost. Just two of the 18-man crew survived; the Master, Captain George Dow, and the engineer, George Rowe, both being washed up on Hellweather Rock. They were rescued by Frederick Charles Hicks, son of lifeboat man William Hicks, who had put off with seven other men in the gig Slippen to search for his father. Rowe managed to swim to the Slippen, but in what was described as "a most daring and brave act", Frederick Hicks jumped into the water, swimming to the rocks with a line, to effect the rescue of Dow, who had been injured.

Frederick Charles Hicks was awarded the RNLI Silver Medal. The United States Government gave him a gold watch, and gold medals were awarded to all the crew of the Slippen.

== Station honours ==
The following are awards made at St Agnes, Isles of Scilly:

- RNLI Silver Medal
  Frederick Charles Hicks, Seaman, gig Slippen – 1908
- Gold Watch, awarded by the Government of the United States
  Frederick Charles Hicks, Seaman, gig Slippen – 1908
- Gold medals, awarded by the Government of the United States
  Each of the crew of the gig Slippen – 1908
- Medal, awarded by the League of Neutral Countries, Haarlem
  Each of the St Agnes lifeboat crew – 1918.

== Roll of honour ==
In memory of those lost whilst serving St Agnes lifeboat:

- Lost from the schooner Thomas W. Lawson, whilst acting as pilot, 13 December 1907
  William Thomas Hicks, crew member (50)

== St Agnes lifeboats ==
| On station | ON (Note: ON is the RNLI's Official Number of the boat.) | Name | Built | Class | Comments |
|---|---|---|---|---|---|
| 1890–1904 | 275 | James and Caroline | 1890 | 34-foot Self-righting (P&S) | (Note: 34 ft 0 in (10.36 m) x 7 ft 6 in (2.29 m) (10-oared) self-righting (P&S) lifeboat, legacy of Mr. J. Goss of Stratford Green, built by Woolfe of Shadwell, London, costing £460.); Later saw service at Upgang and Criccieth. Damaged on service in 1910, and broken up soon after being sold in 1911. |
| 1904–1909 | 516 | Charles Deere James | 1903 | 38-foot Liverpool P&S | (Note: 38 ft 0 in (11.58 m) x 10 ft 0 in (3.05 m) (10-oared) Liverpool-class non-self-righting (P&S) lifeboat, fitted with two drop keels and two water ballast tanks, gift of Mrs S. C. Guthrie of Tunbridge Wells, built by Thames Ironworks of Blackwall, London, costing £1054.); Later at Humber and Winterton. Sold 1927. |
| 1909–1920 | 590 | Charles Deere James | 1909 | 38-foot Watson (P&S) | (Note: 38 ft 0 in (11.58 m) x 9 ft 4 in (2.84 m) (10-oared) Watson-class non-self-righting (P&S) lifeboat, fitted with a drop keel, gift of Mrs S. C. Guthrie of Tunbridge Wells, built by Thames Ironworks of Blackwall, London, costing £1082.); Reserve No.7 with the Relief fleet from 1920. Sold 1934. Renamed Silver Cloud. Last reported as a yacht at Cherbourg, destroyed 1953. |

== See also ==
- St Mary's Lifeboat Station
- List of RNLI stations
- List of former RNLI stations
- Royal National Lifeboat Institution lifeboats
