= SS Rohilla =

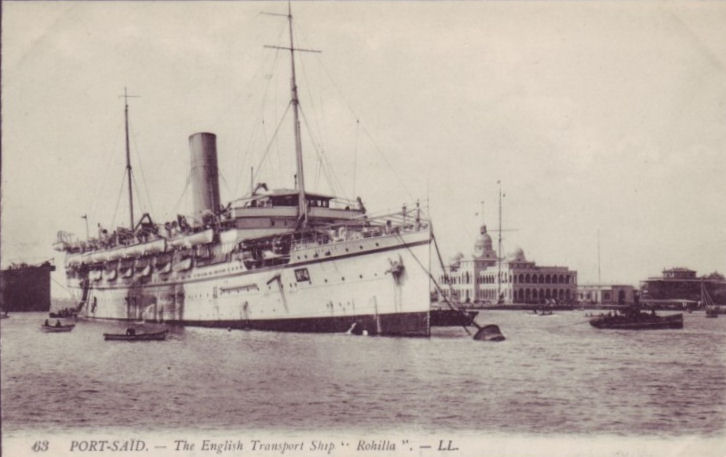
- Transport ship Rohilla at Port Said, 1914

History

United Kingdom
- Name: Rohilla
- Owner: British India Steam Navigation Co
- Port of registry: Glasgow
- Route: 1906: London – Calcutta
- Builder: Harland & Wolff, Belfast
- Yard number: 381
- Launched: 6 September 1906
- Completed: 16 November 1906
- Identification: UK official number 124149; code letters HJQK
- Fate: On 30 October 1914, struck a reef at Saltwick, near Whitby, and sank.

General characteristics
- Type: Passenger ship/troopship, later hospital ship
- Tonnage: 7,114 GRT, 3,970 NRT
- Length: 460.1 ft (140.2 m)
- Beam: 56.0 ft (17.1 m)
- Depth: 30.6 ft (9.3 m)
- Installed power: 8,000 ihp (6,000 kW)
- Propulsion: Twin Harland & Wolff quadruple expansion engines
- Speed: 16.6 knots (30.7 km/h; 19.1 mph)
- Capacity: 167 passengers; later about 1,600 troops
- Notes: sister ship: Rewa

Rohilla was a passenger steamer of the British India Steam Navigation Company which was built for service between the UK and India, and as a troopship. After becoming a hospital ship in the First World War, she ran aground in October 1914, near Whitby, resulting in the loss of 83 lives.

== History ==
Rohilla was ordered in 1905 by the British India Steam Navigation Company (BI) from Harland & Wolff of Belfast, at the same time as sister ship Rewa from William Denny & Bros at Dumbarton. They differed mainly in their engines: Rewa was triple-screw with steam turbines, while Rohilla had a pair of quadruple expansion steam engines, also made by Harland & Wolff, and twin screws. Rohilla's engines totalled 8,000 indicated horsepower (6,000 kW), producing 16.6 knots (30.7 km/h; 19.1 mph) on sea trials. Although ordered for the London to Calcutta service, increased competition prompted BI to design the two sisters to be suitable also as troopships.

The ship was named Rohilla in honour of the Rohillas, Pashtun highlanders who lived in Rohilkhand, east of Delhi, in the modern Indian state of Uttar Pradesh.

After entering service, the sisters were soon taken up for trooping, in 1908 for Rohilla as 'Troopship No.6'. Two years later they were the first BI ships to have wireless telegraphy installed, and were both hired in that year for the Coronation Fleet Review, carrying members of the House of Lords (Rewa) and House of Commons (Rohilla).

== Loss ==
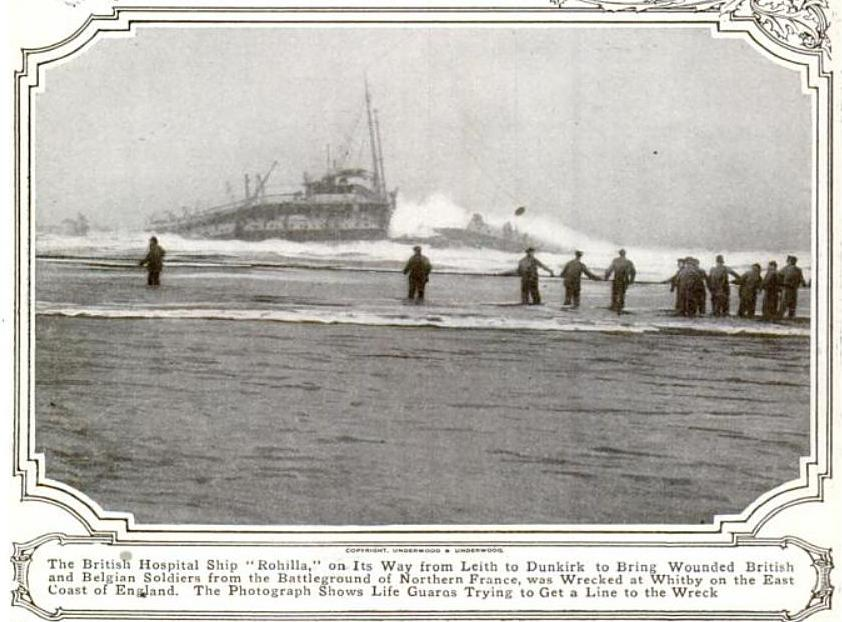
Rohilla grounded off the coast of England, 1914

Rohilla was called up at the outset of the First World War and converted into a naval hospital ship. HMHS (His Majesty's Hospital Ship) Rohilla had only a short life in that role. On 30 October 1914, sailing from South Queensferry, Firth of Forth for Dunkirk to evacuate wounded soldiers, the ship ran aground on Saltwick Nab, a reef about a mile east of Whitby, North Riding of Yorkshire, during a full North North East gale and with the lighthouses unlit due to the war. The reef is about 400 yards (370 m) offshore and the ship soon broke her back.

The conditions made rescue extremely difficult. In all, six lifeboats were called; the John Fielden and Robert and Mary Ellis (ON 588), Whitby No.1 and No.2, William Riley of Birmingham and Leamington from Upgang, Queensbury from Scarborough, and the motor lifeboats Bradford from Teesmouth, and Henry Vernon from Tynemouth. The Bradford was being towed to the scene by a Teesside Harbour tugboat, when she developed a serious leak, and had to return to Middlesbrough. Ultimately it was the Henry Vernon that was to take off the final souls and attempted to close on the wreck. Over the next three days, some of those who attempted to swim to safety in the raging seas were rescued, though many were lost, and lifeboats were able to rescue others. In all, 146 of the 229 people on board survived, including Captain Neilson and all the nurses, as well as Mary Kezia Roberts, already a survivor off the Titanic.

Captain Nielson believed that the ship had struck a mine before grounding. An inquest jury exonerated Nielson from all blame and recommended that all passenger vessels carry rocket apparatus rather than rely on rockets fired to the ship from shore, and also that a motor lifeboat be stationed at Whitby.

The Gold Medal of the Royal National Lifeboat Institution, the Institute's highest honour, was presented to Superintendent Major H. E. Burton and Coxswain Robert Smith of the Tynemouth lifeboat Henry Vernon and to Coxswain Thomas Langlands of the Whitby lifeboat. The Empire Gallantry Medal (subsequently changed to the George Cross) was awarded to Burton and Smith in 1924. In 1917 a monument was erected at Whitby Cemetery by the British India Steam Navigation Company, commemorating all those who lost their lives in the tragedy.

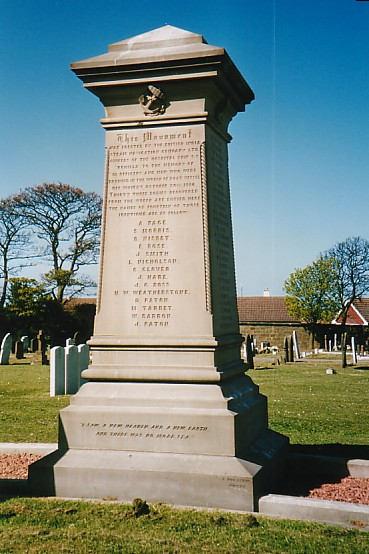
SS Rohilla Memorial, Whitby

== See also ==
- List of United Kingdom disasters by death toll
