= Alum industry in North Yorkshire =

Chemical industry in North Yorkshire, England

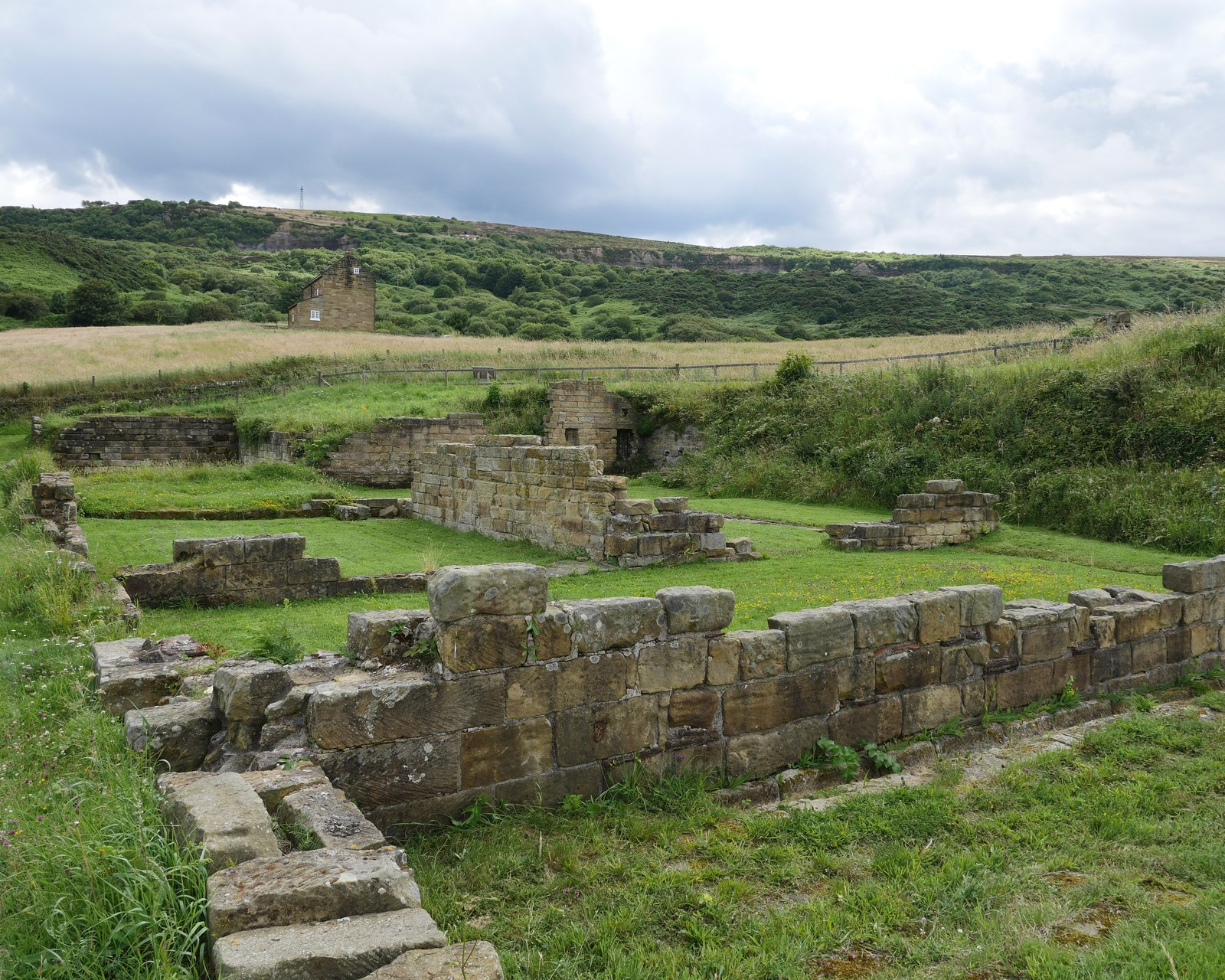
- Peak alum works (Ravenscar)
- Process type: Chemical
- Feedstock: Alum shale Urine (human); Kelp
- Product(s): Alum
- Main facilities: See list
- Year of invention: c. 17th century–19th century

The alum industry in North Yorkshire was a major chemical processing industry in North Yorkshire, England between the 17th and the 19th centuries. The production of alum was suited to North Yorkshire due to the presence of the shale rock needed to make the alum sulphate which was essential as a dyeing agent until synthetic dyes became widely available in the 19th century. Production of alum in North Yorkshire peaked in 1769 with approximately 6,000 tonnes (6,600 tons) produced. The alum industry in North Yorkshire has been labelled the first of the dirty industries in the area, with ironstone mining, steelmaking and the broader Teesside chemical industry all following on much later from the alum workings. Apart from one large site in Lancashire, almost all of the industrial alum supplied to Britain originated in North Yorkshire. Smaller concerns were operated sporadically in Dorset and London.

== History ==
For over 250 years, the coastal and moorland areas of North Yorkshire were the centre of the alum industry in England. Alum was required for tanning, medicines, and most importantly, as a mordant for fixing dye into clothes or cloth, before the industrial revolution allowed dyes distilled from coal, via a sulphuric acid method, to be readily available. In the Elizabethan age, most alum was acquired from workings in Italy, and the availability of supply was controlled entirely by the Italians and meant that the supply could be turned off due to political whims; Henry VIII, Edward VI, and Elizabeth I had seceded religiously from Catholicism to form the Church of England. Sir Thomas Chaloner discovered alum-shale rocks on his estates in Guisborough, and he set about exploiting this resource and received Royal Assent from James I, but after two years of operation, the licence to produce alum passed to the crown. (Note: Chaloner was said to have seen the alum works belonging to the pope sometime in the late 16th/early 17th century, and recognised that the geology of the area was the same as the lands near to his house in Guisborough. He enticed two or three workers from the pope's alum works to come over to Yorkshire and work for him. For this, the pope was said to have cursed Chaloner and the workers who left with him. However, most authors disagree with this version of events, particularly the curse extended by the pope.) By the year 1609, a law had been passed prohibiting the import of foreign alum, partly so that it could generate revenue for the crown, but also due to the nature of the strained relations between the recently protestant United Kingdom, and the majority of foreign countries that supplied alum being Catholic. Documents from the era show that in the early years, the hiring of foreign experts to aid with the alum production was necessary, but by the 1630s, the English alum workers were in high demand across Europe and only the intervention of the government prevented those workers from being hired abroad. (Note: A document from 1617 states that a Frenchman was paid for "..his charges from London to the Northern workes to trye his skill in boylinge allome there.)

North Yorkshire became a powerhouse region for the creation of alum and its associated transportation. Other sites were tried throughout Britain, including Lancashire, Dorset, Hurlet in Scotland, Neath in South Wales, and London. The discovery of alum in Dorset occurred in the 1560s, with licences being granted for the industry there. The site in London was quite close to the Tower of London and was started during the reign of Charles I, but was suppressed in 1627 due to the "loathsome vapour" that the site produced, and was alleged to have been poisoning the fish in the Thames.

Alum shales were quarried, then burnt on huge open fires of brushwood, sometimes for up to nine months. The stacks for burning often were 98 feet (30 m) wide, and 49 feet (15 m) high. The resulting powder was steeped in tanks of water (lixiviation), which extracted the sulphates of iron, and the pyrites within the shale produced sulphuric acid, which in turn, precipitated the alumina. It could take up to 33–100 tonnes (36–110 tons) of alum shale rock to produce 1-tonne (1.1-ton) of alum. The liquid was then moved by gravity to the alum house where it was boiled, and the key to the best time to stop heating was to float a hen's egg in the liquor to act as a hydrometer. When the egg floated to the top of the liquor, it was ready for the boiling to cease, and for the liquor to be separated out. At this point, the yellow iron silicate (known as Slam) was siphoned off the liquor, and could be sold on to make fertiliser. Wherever possible, the use of gravity was employed to cause as little effort as possible in transporting the product. Quarries were usually stepped, and the quarried rock was burnt lower down than the quarry face, and when the burnt rock was mixed with water to form the liquor, troughs would then allow the liquor to run downhill to a building known as the alum house for the boiling process. This process of firing, cooling, settling, heating, separating and mixing, has led to it being labelled the first of Yorkshire's dirty industries. One writer commented that the 80 boiling pans in constant use at Boulby, represented "a true hell's cauldron." Some accolades have heralded the alum industry in Yorkshire as the first inorganic chemical industry in Britain, but copperas was being worked in Essex and Kent some 25 years before the alum industry took off in Yorkshire.

The alum industry helped develop the port of Whitby as not only was the finished product stored in "houses" on the quayside, and then exported through the port, but coal had to be brought in for the process. (Note: The earlier operations around Guisborough were serviced by sea transport via Coatham and the River Tees; the larger workings at Sandsend and Mulgrave had supplies sent via Whitby. Coatham also had houses within the port area for the storage of finished alum.) A record of ships leaving and entering Whitby harbour in 1612, shows that one particular ship, the Allome An, made four trips to London carrying a total of 217 tonnes (239 tons) of alum. Imported coal, mostly from Sunderland, totalled 667 chaldrons, in a total of 39 inwards sailings throughout the same year also. (Note: The weight of a Chaldron differed between a Newcastle Chaldron (53 short hundredweight (5,300 lb; 2,400 kg)), and a London Chaldron (27 short hundredweight (2,700 lb; 1,200 kg)).)

Another important ingredient in the process was the use of human urine as a source of ammonia, which initially came locally from Whitby, and then from Newcastle and Hull, but the amounts supplied proved insufficient (2 tonnes (2.2 tons) of urine was needed to make 1-tonne (1.1-ton) of alum). The supply chain was switched to London, with collected urine being sent north in tubs. The preferred urine was that from the poorer classes, as they tended to drink beer not wine, the resultant urine was better for the process. This had a secondary benefit in sewage disposal for the City of London, and those supplying the urine were paid for the product. Alternatively, burnt kelp was used to precipitate potassium sulphate in the process, and whilst local supplies were used, eventually kelp had to be sourced from mainland Scotland and Orkney when the supply derived from the coast of North Yorkshire was not plentiful enough. The need to transport urine, coal and other ingredients in, coupled with the need to export the finished alum, led, in part to the creation of flat-bottomed boats known as "Whitby Cats". Many of the coastal workings were not by a suitable harbour, and so ships would beach themselves at low tide to allow the transfer of minerals. The transport of goods was limited due to the alum workings all being before the advent of railways in the area; (Note: The inland workings closed down before the mass proliferation of railways in the 19th century, and the largest works at Boulby, Peak and Sandsend Ness closed down before the railways that would run past their locations had actually opened (1883, 1885 and 1883 respectively).) historical documents show that coal from the Durham Coalfield was transported through Yarm to feed the works inland via a pannier system, or by ship for the coastal workings.

The location of alum workings extended from Ravenscar on the coast at its southern extent north-westwards towards Skinningrove, before curving inland at the foot of the Cleveland Hills escarpment, finishing near Osmotherley in the small village of Thimbleby. However, the inland workings were on a smaller scale than the coastal workings; partly due to shale reserves, but also at the time, transportation of the finished product was simpler for the coastal workings as ships could simply moor-up on the beach adjacent, or below the workings. Some sites took advantage of the boats that could beach themselves, others, such as at Saltwick Bay, developed their own harbours to export the alum. Inland working has one advantage over the coastal areas in that the overburden above the alum shale was said to be thinner and softer making it easier to extract the shale underneath. In 1769, production of alum across the Yorkshire sites peaked at 6,000 tonnes (6,600 tons) for the year, however, by the end of the 18th century, alum was selling at £13 per tonne, when it cost £14 per tonne to produce. The band of alum shale in North Yorkshire is typically 100 feet (30 m) thick, and exists at varying depths. The lower section of shale had a greater ratio of bituminous material and was not used for alum making. Fossils were also found within the shale measures; a huge plesiosur is on display in the Yorkshire Museum in York, and other finds have been an ichthyosaurus, and a teleosuarus (a huge crocodile). The cap over the alum shales at the coastal workings was usually sandstone, which could be used as a secondary aggregate for building purposes, but it needed care to remove it. In some places, this caused quarrying problems, such as at Kettleness, where the cap is said to have been 39 feet (12 m) thick.

In December 1829, heavy rainfall caused the village of Kettleness to slip into the sea. The inhabitants had taken shelter in a ship, the Little Henry which had come to the coast there to collect alum. The destruction of the village and its alum works delayed alum production for two years, and the quarrying on the coastline was blamed for the village slipping into the sea.

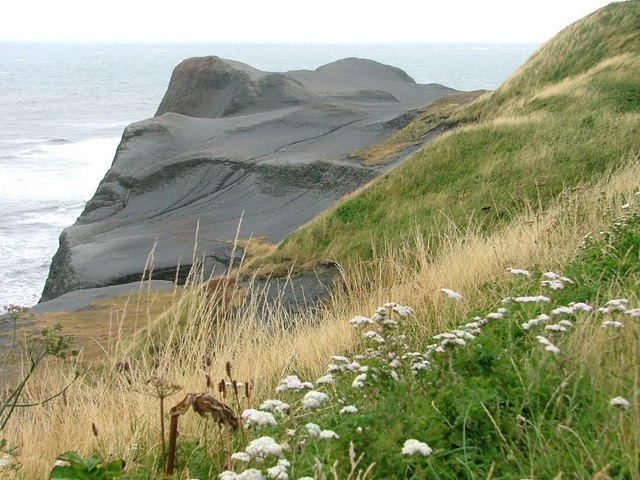
Sandsend Alum Workings; the industrial process has limited plant growth

The village of Sandsend, so called because that is where the sandy stretch of beach northwards from Whitby ends, was developed as a village for those employed at the nearby alum works. The alum shale depths in the cliffs there reached almost 90 feet (27 m), and the coastal location was able to take advantage of sea transport. Inland locations were hampered by their lack of transport methods, whereas the coastal locations had easy access to the sea. Additionally, inland locations had the problem of overburden, which in the instances of coastal alum workings, the overburden was simply tipped into the sea. A lot of the inland locations, particularly the early ones around Guisborough, exported their alum through the Port of Whitby, which not only increased trade through Whitby, but led to growth of the town.

The alum trade died-off largely as a result of aniline dyes (derived from coal-tar), which were introduced in 1856, being cheaper and less labour intensive to exploit. Whilst alum workings ceased operating in the second half of the 19th century, commercial exploitation of alum continued in the Sandsend area for a type of cement until well into the 20th century. The product was known as Mulgrave Cement, and was made at a plant in East Row (Sandsend) between 1811 and 1936. The cement was widely used locally for vases, tiles, pipes, chimney pots and concrete blocks. Some of the old alum sites have gained listed protection, whereas others, such as those at Saltwick Bay, have seen erosion destroy the old alum house on the beach, and coastal erosion threatens the entire site.

== Geological setting ==
The Yorkshire alum shales were deposited in the Jurassic. The quarried sites are in the Lias Group particularly a band, the Alum Shale Member, c. 35m thick within the Whitby Mudstone Formation. The Alum Shale Member is a pyritic and bituminous, dark grey mudstone containing an abundant ammonite and bivalve fauna. It is the least silty part of the Whitby Mudstone Formation this, the low calcium carbonate content, and its pyritic nature, made it particularly useful for alum production. The 19th century miners used the presence of the bivalve Nuculana ovum to identify the strata suitable for making alum, and Lewis Hunton, whose family were closely associated with the Yorkshire alum trade, noted in 1836 that "Failures have occurred to different works in attempting the calcination of the lower portions of the Upper Lias, or those strata undistinguished by the N. ovum". He also observed “the lower strata having such an excess of pyrites and bitumen, that the contents of a kiln made from such schistus, invariably overroasts”. The presence of the bottom dwelling Nuculana ovum indicated the stratigraphic level at which the increase in bottom water oxygenation after the Toarcian Oceanic Anoxic Event had reached the point that, during deposition of the mudstone, the formation of pyrite (for sulphate production) and organic matter (for calcining) was optimally balanced for alum production.

== Sites ==
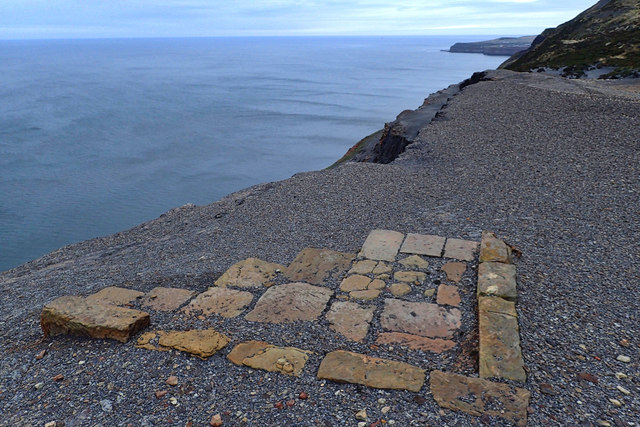
Loftus Alum Quarries

Below is a list of major sites in North Yorkshire providing alum to Britain between 1600 and 1870. The bulk of alum production in Britain on an industrial scale was centred on the North Yorkshire region, although one major site did operate in Lancashire, and others were on the south coast of England, notably in Dorset and Hampshire. A further site was operated at Wexford in Ireland, though at the time, it was under British control. Archaeological investigations have determined around 30 sites in North Yorkshire, although 50 have been known to have operated throughout England between the 17th and 19th centuries.

The most enduring sites were those located on the coast which could take advantage of coastal shipping for the import of raw materials, and the ability to export the finished alum. The sites at Ayton Banks, Boulby, Kettleness, Peak (Ravenscar), Sandsend, Saltwick Nab, and Stoupe Brow are all either listed buildings or scheduled monuments. The site at Loftus also had rutways some 4 feet 4 inches (1.32 m) carved into the rock on the seashore. Archaeologists have theorised that these were to enable delivery of materials in carts across the rocks and could be used even when the tide was coming in.

Sites which trialled producing alum, or had a very short working life, included Cringle Moor, Easington, Eskdaleside (17th century works), Hawsker, Holmes Rock Hole (Port Mulgrave), Ingleby, Kirkby Bank, Kirkleatham, and Thimbleby. Two sites are known to have existed at Saltburn, but the exact locations of these sites is unknown.

Main alum producing sites in the North Yorkshire
Name	Location	Coords	Dates (Note: Dates of production may not have been continuous.)	Notes	Ref
Ayton Banks	Great Ayton	54.489°N 1.093°W	1765 – 1771	Short-lived site, abandoned when better locations were developed on the coast. Initially, the site opened after the price of alum per tonne increased (the price had fallen sharply during the Seven Years' War). It appears that after 1771, the site was not used again for alum production.	
Ash Holm	Mulgrave Woods	54.494°N 0.700°W	1609 – c. 1730s	Early site in Sandsend area, but suffered due to its inland location. Site was abandoned when the area was landscaped into a formal park (Mulgrave Woods).	
Belman Bank	Guisborough	54.523°N 1.043°W	1595 – c. 1620	The first site developed by Chaloner.	
Boulby	Boulby	54.566°N 0.838°W	1650 – 1870		
Carlton	Carlton in Cleveland	54.418°N 1.199°W	c. 1680 – 1774	The alum works were located on the slopes of the Cleveland Hills facing towards Teesside.	
Eskdaleside	Esk Valley	54.443°N 0.688°W	1764 – 1817		
Goathland Banks	Littlebeck	54.439°N 0.654°W	1765 – 1805	Also known as Godeland Banks.	
Grosmont	Grosmont	54.434°N 0.724°W	Early 17th century	The site is under where the church building is located, though the quarry was located elsewhere. A plan of the estate from 1636 shows the site labelled as allome garth.	
Kettleness	Kettleness	54.532°N 0.714°W	1728 – 1861	The site experienced a landslip in 1829 due to the quarrying of the alum, with a mass of earth slipping into the sea.	
Littlebeck	Littlebeck	54.430°N 0.644°W	1660 – 1809	Sometimes known as Thornhill to distinguish it from the other site at Goathland Banks	
Lingberry Hill	Loftus	54.569°N 0.845°W	c. 1650 – 1866	Site was originally called Lingberry Hill, then later Lofthouse (the original name for the area), then later Loftus. The Lingberry Hill works stretched along the coastline for over 1.2 miles (2 km).	
Peak	Ravenscar	54.405°N 0.502°W	1650 – 1862	Peak is one of the best preserved sites on the coast and is now a scheduled monument.	
Saltwick Bay	Whitby	54.482°N 0.579°W	1649 – 1791	Production ceased between 1708 and 1755, though in 1764, Saltwick Bay is recorded as producing 240 tonnes (260 tons) per year, just less than 10% of the output of alum from the North Yorkshire region. Like the Peak works at Ravenscar, the works at Saltwick are a scheduled monument.	
Sandsend Ness	Lythe	54.512°N 0.673°W	1613 – c. 1880		
Selby Hagg	Skelton-in-Cleveland	54.567°N 0.957°W	1612 – 1776	Selby Hagg was also known as Saltburn Works, though it was nearer Skelton-in-Cleveland. Bowes names the site as Selby Hogg.	
Slapewath	Guisborough	54.530°N 1.010°W	1603 – 1653; 1662 – 1698; 1765 – 1805	Slapewath is thought to be one of the first alum quarries in Cleveland and in the United Kingdom, but is recognised as being the first fully-functioning alum site which handled all stages of the process. Had three periods of working.	
Stoupe Brow	Ravenscar	54.415°N 0.523°W	1752 – 1817		
Thimbleby	Thimbleby	54.360°N 1.287°W	1752 – 1772	The most westerly of the alum works, at the edge of the Cleveland hills. Also known as "Osmotherley".	
