= Sandsend Ness =

Alum quarrying site in North Yorkshire, England

Coordinates: 54.5123°N 0.6788°W

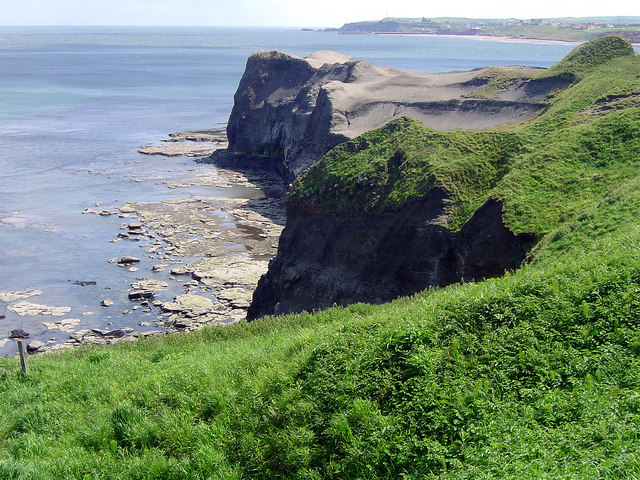
Sandsend Ness

Sandsend Ness is an old alum quarrying site close to Whitby in North Yorkshire, England.

Beneath extensive deposits of grey pyritic shale a thin band of sideritic mudstone is present at this site and there is a further 6 metres (20 ft) of almost non-bituminous shale beneath it. This geological configuration, along with its proximity to the port of Whitby, offered Sandsend near-ideal conditions for the rapidly expanding alum industry from the early 17th century onwards.

So wide-scale and prolonged were these activities, that significant areas of the Yorkshire coast were permanently altered.

The double sulphate of aluminium and either potassium or ammonia is commonly known as alum. This material was of great importance through to the late 19th century in leather tanning and in the wool dying industry. Even today it is still used in some places as a mordant (dye fixative).

Fossils are present in large numbers in the deposits, including ammonites such as Hildoceras bifrons and Dactylioceras bifrons and also Ichthyosaur and Plesiosaur remains, though the latter are nowadays much less commonly found. In fact, the ammonite Hildoceras is named after an early Christian saint, the Abbess of Whitby St. Hild or Hilda (614–680). It was believed that such ammonite fossils were the snakes which had been miraculously turned into stone by St. Hilda. It was not unknown for local "artisans" to carve snakes' heads onto ammonites, and sell these "relics" as proof of the miracle. The coat of arms of nearby Whitby actually include three such 'snakestones'.
