= Thomas Chaloner (naturalist) =

Thomas Chaloner (floruit 1584) was an English naturalist. He was the son of John Chaloner, Irish secretary of state during the reign of Queen Elizabeth I, (who was himself the son of John Chaloner, an earlier Tudor statesman). Thomas was therefore first cousin to Sir Thomas Chaloner who became Governor of the Courtly College (for the maintenance of the household of Prince Henry, son of James I), with whom he is often confused or conflated.

Chaloner the naturalist devoted his resources to prospecting for copper and for alum in Ireland. He played a part in his cousin's development of the alum industry in England. In 1584 he published A Short Discourse of the most rare Vertue of Nitre (Gerald Dewes, London), a practical work in advance of the age. He recognised that certain plants grew wherever the minerals responsible for the formation of alum were present in the soil. From this he recognised that the rock from which the alum was made was similar to that abundant in several areas in and around his cousin's Guisborough estate, in present-day Redcar and Cleveland. In 1606-07 Sir Thomas (the courtier) went into partnership with Sir David Foulis and with Lord Sheffield and Sir John Bourchier, obtaining a monopoly for 31 years of manufacture in northern England. These interests were acquired by the English Crown.

== Bibliography ==
- Beckmann, Johann (1846). Francis, William; Griffith, John William (eds.). A history of inventions, discoveries, and origins. Vol. 1. Translated by Johnston, William (4 ed.). H.G. Bohn.
