= Saltwick Bay =

Bay in North Yorkshire, England

Coordinates: 54.48465°N 0.58567°W

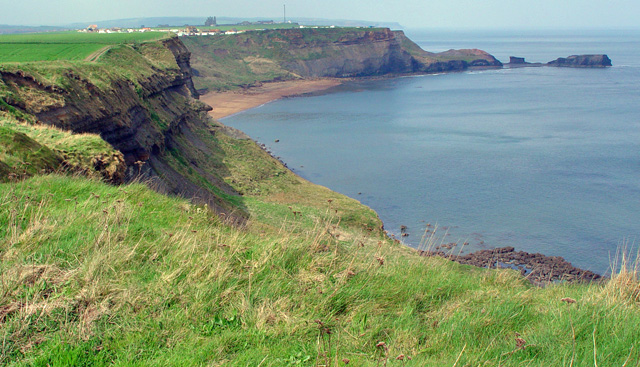
- Saltwick Bay
- Unitary authority: North Yorkshire
- Ceremonial county: North Yorkshire
- Region: Yorkshire and the Humber
- Country: England
- Sovereign state: United Kingdom
- Police: North Yorkshire
- Fire: North Yorkshire
- Ambulance: Yorkshire

Saltwick Bay is a north-east facing bay approximately one mile (1.6 km) to the east of Whitby, on the east coast of North Yorkshire, England. The bay contains the Saltwick Nab alum quarries, listed under the Ancient Monuments and Archaeological Areas Act 1979. The bay is part of the Saltwick Formation and known for its collections of fossils. The SS Rohilla hospital ship sank in the bay in 1914, and the fishing trawler Admiral Van Tromp was shipwrecked there in 1976. The bay is accessible through Whitby Holiday Park.

== History ==
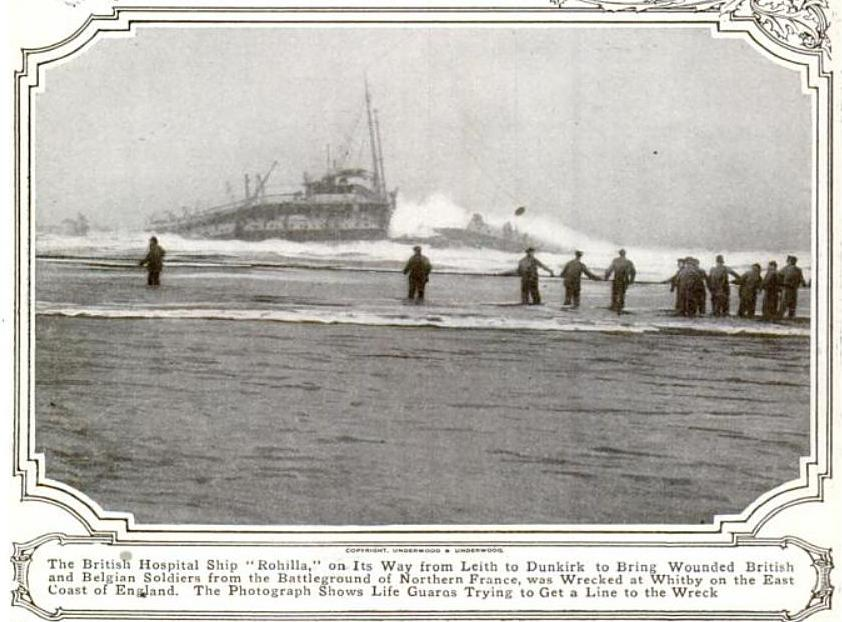
Image of the SS Rohilla grounded in Saltwick Bay

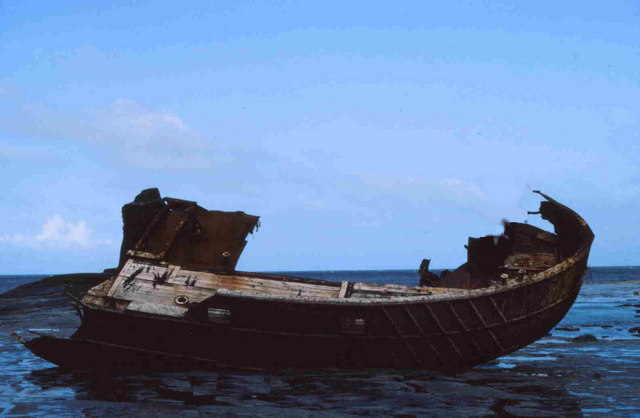
Remains of the shipwrecked Admiral Van Tromp fishing vessel in Saltwick Bay in 1983

Alum was quarried at Saltwick Bay, with the first recorded quarrying being by Sir Hugh Chomley, who lived at Whitby Abbey, in the 17th century. The alum quarries were built on promontories and were 590 feet (180 m) in length and 115 feet (35 m) in depth. The quarries eventually closed in 1791. There is also evidence of a medieval harbour at Saltwick Bay, and in the 18th century, Saltwick Bay and Whitby Harbour had a one-mile (1.6 km) triangular shale reef.

Quarrying led to the discovery of fossils, and the bay is now known as being a location for fossils from the Lower Jurassic period. Fossils commonly found at Saltwick Bay include the Dactylioceras and Hildoceras, as well as fossilised plant remains. Cuspiteuthis tubularis fossils can be found near the Black Nab, an island in the bay. In around 1764, a horse skeleton was found about 30 yards (27 m) underground in the alum mines at Saltwick Bay, and in 1824, an almost complete skeleton of the extinct teleosaurid Steneosaurus bollensis was discovered at the bay. The skeleton is now displayed at the Whitby Museum. Skeleta of Steneosaurus brevior, another crocodile, have been found at the bay. Other skeleta found at Saltwick Bay have included an ichthyosaur and a plesiosaur, (Sthenarosaurus)

In 1914, the hospital ship SS Rohilla sank near Saltwick Nab in the bay; 146 of the 229 on board, including Captain Neilson and all the nurses, as well as Titanic survivor Mary Kezia Roberts, survived. The conditions made rescue extremely difficult, but lifeboats from Whitby, Upgang (near Whitby), Redcar, Tynemouth and Scarborough attempted to close on the wreck. In 1917, the SS Brentwood, which was owned by William Cory and Son Ltd, was sunk in Saltwick Bay by German mines. During the Second World War, the bay was used as a gun point. In 1976, the trawler Admiral Van Tromp was wrecked in the bay, and two people on board died; the remains of the trawler are still visible in the bay.
