= Port of Whitby =

Port in North Yorkshire, England

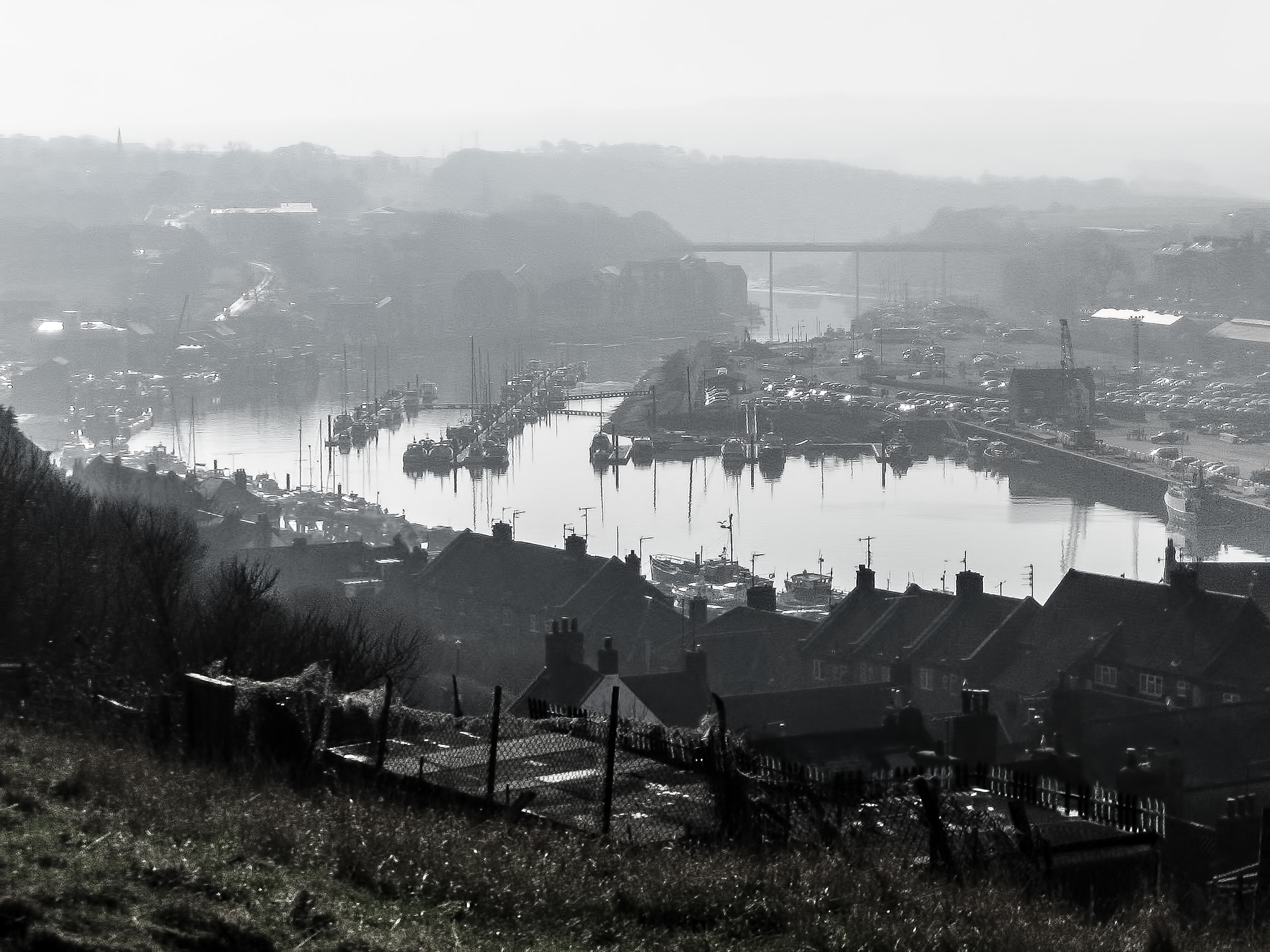
- Whitby Harbour looking upriver
- Interactive map of Port of Whitby
- Location within North Yorkshire

Location
- Country: England
- Location: Whitby, North Yorkshire
- Coordinates: 54.485°N 0.612°W
- GB Gridref: NZ899108
- UN/LOCODE: GB GWB

Details
- Owned by: WHC (1702–1906); WUDC (1906–1974); SBC (1974–2023); NYC (2023–)
- Type of Harbor: River natural

The Port of Whitby is an ancient and historic seaport on the North Yorkshire coast of England. The port lies at the mouth of the River Esk, where it enters the North Sea. A port has been in existence at Whitby since at least the 7th century, when it was used to bring in supplies for Whitby Abbey. The port is famous for being the port of origin for the sailings of Captain Cook, and some of the ships that he sailed on were also built in the harbour.

Commercial cargo ceased in the late 20th century; however, the port is still important for the landing of fish.

== History ==
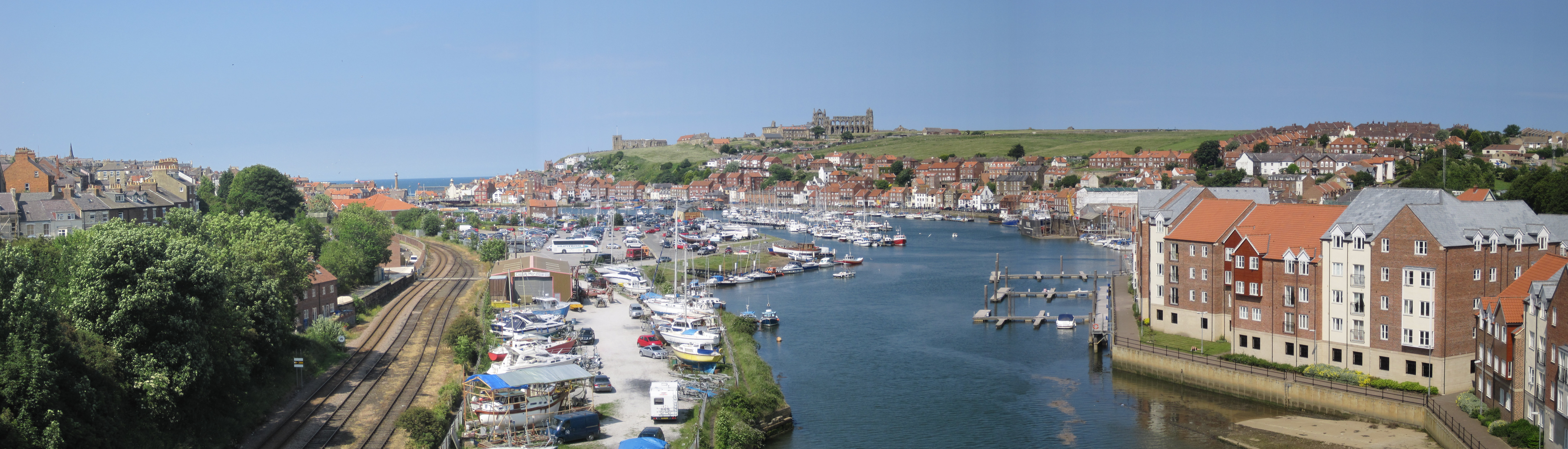
Panoramic view of Whitby Harbour from A171 road bridge over River Esk

No records exist of actual dates when the port started, but fish were being landed at Whitby during the time that the first abbey had been built in 657. It is thought that the port was in what is now the upper harbour (south of the swing bridge, as coastal erosion had not yet subjected the lower harbour cliff walls to collapse, making that side of the estuary too steep to house piers). William de Percy granted the port to the abbey at Whitby, a grant which was confirmed by William II sometime before 1096. In 1122, a dispute was recorded in the collection of tithes from fishermen due to the abbot, which also noted that coal was imported into Whitby.

During the Middle Ages and into the 18th century, the ports of England were administered by the Exchequer, who divided the ports into the main ports, with lesser ports on the coast near to them being labelled as creco or creek ports. Whitby was a creek port of Newcastle with a reach to what is Spital Bridge in the town, but the authority of the port later reached upstream to the tidal limit of Ruswarp.

The port was never equal to other ports in the area such as Hull or Middlesbrough. This is due to the hinterland that surrounded the port, with Whitby being largely cut-off from overland travel until the 18th and 19th centuries, it had no great industries to export or import for, being surrounded on all sides of the river by moorland (except for the coast to the north). Trade through the port accelerated with the coming of the railways, but its main function was either as a shelter for ships from storms in the North Sea, or as a re-supply point. Between 1702 and 1704, the number of collier ships alone totalled 98, Bridlington, Hull and Scarborough only hosted 48, 28 and 54 respectively. The safe haven almost guaranteed at Whitby (and at Scarborough and Bridlington too), allowed the port to charge a levy towards the upkeep of the harbour and piers. The levy also applied to passing trade of coal from many north-eastern locations, with the levy not being rescinded until 1861.

During the era of timber shipbuilding (mid 16th–late 19th centuries), vessels would arrive from the St. Lawrence River carrying timber, masts and bowsprits. These vessels were too large to enter the harbour, and would unload their cargo onto smaller ships in the Whitby Roads. (Note: The Whitby Roads is an area of deeper water (typically between 3–6 fathoms (18–36 ft; 5–11 m)), away from the harbour mouth. Ships could wait here for the tide to be right for entering the harbour, or could offload onto smaller craft.) The smaller craft would then enter the harbour to unload the delivery on the dockside. Another method of offloading goods from the ship without actually entering Whitby harbour was to beach the vessel on the sand. This was a common practice for delivering coal to places such as Sandsend, (Note: The road between Whitby and Sandsend was actually on the beach in the middle of the 19th century, which would make it impassable when the tide was in. A Whitby Cat was able to deliver its coal direct to Sandsend without the product having to be trans-shipped from ship to horse and cart and then taken along the beach.) and for which the Whitby Cats, (a flat-bottomed boat), was specifically designed.

A survey in the 1950s determined that the port at Whitby was not as successful as other neighbouring cargo ports such as Hull, Teesside and West Hartlepool, on account of its lack of urban sprawl, and the absence of warehouses on the dock side with which to store goods in a safe manner before onward export, or inward transportation. It also suffered a loss of traffic due to the depth of the water in the harbour; as the sailing ships gave way to first paddle steamers, and then steel boats of even bigger sizes, the newer ships could not negotiate into the harbour.

Whitby's port was divided into two main sections; the upper harbour south of the swing bridge, and the lower harbour, north of the swing bridge. The lower harbour has been the location of the fish markets during the 20th and 21st centuries. In 1956, a new fish quay was built adjacent to Pier Road on the west bank of the River Esk. Dredging along the lower harbour had damaged the previous fish quay which had been built in 1914. The fish market in Whitby port increased after the railways arrived in the town as this allowed fresh fish to be dispatched across the country at a faster pace than delivered by boat.

Part of the upper harbour area was converted into a marina between 2008 and 2010.

== 21st century port ==
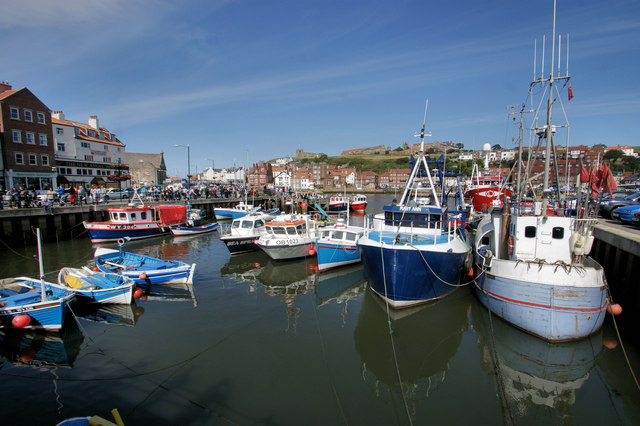
The inner harbour

The maximum DWT in the port is 3,000 tonnes (3,300 tons), with a length of 85 metres (279 ft), a beam of 15 metres (49 ft) and a draught of 6 metres (20 ft). However, cargo trade, except for fish-landing, ceased in the year 2000.

== Commodities ==
Historically, the port was known for its involvement in the export of alum, and the importing of timber, nominally for building ships. Timber, flax and hemp were imported from the Baltic states during the 18th and 19th centuries, but this was to further the shipbuilding, and during the winter months even more importantly, the ship repairing trade due to Whitby's location as a safe port. However, its most lasting and notable trade has been in the landing of fish and the whale industry. In the 17th century, herring were being exported to Scotland, and the associated herring industry required the import of salt.

In the early 17th century, the record books begin to show more and more trade within the port due to the accelerated demand of the alum industry. Coal is shown as increasing rapidly, though peat burning was still being used in domestic capacities, so the increase in coal volumes is tied to the alum-making. A storehouse for coal was built near Haggersgate, a road in the town on the west bank of the harbour where the new fish quay is. Also imported were malt, rye and wine. Exports were finished alum, the bark stripped from timber being used for shipbuilding, and sailcloth. One of the oddest commodities imported into the harbour was human urine. The alum industry required ammonia as part of its process, and the easiest source of this at the time was human urine. While some came in from local areas, it was brought in from as far afield as Newcastle and London.

In 1675, the port was handling alum, ham, butter, salt and fish. Several alum works existed in the area around Whitby, and so the port offered a natural point of offloading. This in turn generated export of alum, and the import of timber, so that Whitby could build its own ships to transport the goods needed, and export the finished alum itself. The landing of whales at Whitby flourished between 1753 and 1835, concentrated on the Northern Whale Fishery around Greenland. No attempt was made by Whitby boats to try whaling in Antarctica, the favoured region by whalers sailing from Hull and London. However, the whaling industry in Whitby was described as a "losing concern" in a government report of 1833 as oil was available from other sources. Between 1753 and 1835, a total of 2,687 whale carcasses were brought back to the port, an average of 32 per year. The rendering of whale blubber was undertaken further upriver than the port, around the area where Larpool Viaduct now stands. The waste from the blubber to oil process, known locally as Fenks, was exported from the port as a manure.

A sample of imports and exports from 1790 shows that imports consisted of fruit, wine, spices and other foods, but most critically, the greatest tonnage came in the form of oars, anchors, pitch, oakum, timber, hemp, rope, cordage, linen and hessian canvas, all of which were essential to the shipbuilding industry. The balance in the exports was a less comprehensive list but included wines, tar, alum, bacon, ham, butter, oats, ale, whale products and dried fish. Again, items associated with the shipbuilding industry are present, but the most interesting export was sleepers and pit props, of which nearly 17,000 were dispatched by ship.

In the 19th century, coal which was formerly offloaded at Whitby, started to arrive in the town via the railway. As most collieries were connected to the railway, and the loading charges for taking wagons over the railway had already been paid by the colliery, having to then trans-ship the coal to a boat to deliver within the UK was uneconomically viable at that time. Iron ore and iron products were exported through Whitby by the South Cleveland Iron Works, who had a smelter at Grosmont, some 6 miles (9.7 km) south of Whitby accessible by the Whitby & Pickering Railway. Smaller iron ore concerns also used the port, with most being transferred to either Teesside or Tyneside by ship, but this was short-lived in the face of the increasing railway network and the quick exhaustion of iron ore seams in the area. Buoyed by the arrival of the railways, minerals were exported through the port, and local sandstone from Aislaby was sent to London to build London Bridge and the Houses of Parliament.

While ferries are not known to have operated from Whitby, shipping did take passengers in the form of convicts transported to Australia and emigrants to Canada, usually to St Lawrence in the 1820s and 1830s.

== Owners ==
- Whitby Harbour Commissioners (1702–1906)
- Whitby Urban District Council (1906–1974)
- Scarborough Borough Council (1974–2023)
- North Yorkshire Council (2023–)

== See also ==
- Ship and boat building in Whitby
- Piers of Whitby
- Eskdale Anticline
