= List of shipwrecks in September 1851 =

The list of shipwrecks in September 1851 includes ships sunk, foundered, wrecked, grounded, or otherwise lost during September 1851.

== 1 September ==
List of shipwrecks: 1 September 1851
Ship	State	Description
Antelope	United States	The brig was driven ashore and broke her back at Cape Henry, Virginia. She was on a voyage from New York to Marseille, Bouches-du-Rhône, France.
Lissy	Stettin	The ship ran aground and capsized at the mouth of the Somme with the loss of a crew member.

== 2 September ==
List of shipwrecks: 2 September 1851
Ship	State	Description
Abigail	United States	The schooner was wrecked on a reef north of Barbuda. Her crew were rescued. She was on a voyage from Baltimore, Maryland to Saint Lucia.
Moselle	United Kingdom	The brig was abandoned in the Atlantic Ocean 100 nautical miles (190 km) west of Faial Island, Azores. Her crew were rescued.
Navigator	United Kingdom	The ship ran aground and was wrecked at Bideford, Devon. She was on a voyage from Arkhangelsk, Russia to Bideford.

== 3 September ==
List of shipwrecks: 3 September 1851
Ship	State	Description
Isabella	United Kingdom	The ship was driven ashore and damaged on Hogland, Russia. She was on a voyage from Sunderland, County Durham to Kronstadt, Russia. She was refloated the next day and taken in to Crostadt, where she arrived on 7 September in a severely leaky condition.
Navigator	United Kingdom	The ship ran aground in the River Torridge. She was on a voyage from Arkhangelsk, Russia to Bideford, Devon.
Sarah	United Kingdom	The schooner was wrecked on the Scroby Sands, Norfolk. The wreck was subsequently beached at Southwold, Suffolk.

== 4 September ==
List of shipwrecks: 4 September 1851
Ship	State	Description
Dolon	United Kingdom	The ship was driven ashore and sank at Kettleness, Yorkshire.
Edith	United Kingdom	The ship was driven ashore at Redcar, Yorkshire. She was on a voyage from South Shields, County Durham to Southampton, Hampshire. She was refloated and put in to Whitby, Yorkshire in a severely leaky condition.
Providence	United Kingdom	The sloop sank in the River Avon at Sea Mills, Bristol, Gloucestershire.
Sarah	United Kingdom	The schooner was wrecked on the Scroby Sands, Norfolk. She subsequently floated off and capsized. She was found off Easton Bavents, Suffolk on 7 September and was towed in to Southwold.
Victoria	United Kingdom	The ship ran aground on the Whitby Rock. She was refloated with assistance from the tug Champion (United Kingdom) and resumed her voyage in a leaky condition.

== 5 September ==
List of shipwrecks: 5 September 1851
Ship	State	Description
Metropolis	United Kingdom	The barque was driven ashore at "Bintang" and was abandoned by her crew. She was on a voyage from China to Halifax, Nova Scotia, British North America. She was refloated on 12 September and towed in to Singapore by the steamship HCS Hooghly (United Kingdom). She arrived at Singapore on 23 September in a waterlogged condition.
Volant	(United Kingdom of Great Britain and Ireland) British North America	The ship was driven ashore and severely damaged at Campobello Island. She was on a voyage from Saint Andrews, New Brunswick to Liverpool, Lancashire. Volant was refloated and towed in to Saint Andrew in a waterlogged condition. She was consequently condemned.

== 6 September ==
List of shipwrecks: 6 September 1851
Ship	State	Description
Cervantes	Spain	The brig was wrecked on the Longsand, in the North Sea off the coast of Essex, United Kingdom. Her nine crew were rescued by the lugger Nelson (United Kingdom). Cervantes was on a voyage from Christiansand, Norway to Barcelona.
Faith	United Kingdom	The schooner was in collision with the sloop Fear-Not (United Kingdom) and sank off the Eddystone Rocks, Cornwall. Her crew were rescued.
Hero	(United Kingdom of Great Britain and Ireland) New Zealand	The schooner capsized during a heavy gale while en route from Auckland to the Bay of Plenty. All three men on board drowned.
Home	United Kingdom	The ship was driven ashore on Bornholm, Denmark. Her crew were rescued. She was on a voyage from Saint Petersburg, Russia to Sunderland, County Durham. She had become a wreck by 8 September.
Isabella	United Kingdom	The schooner was driven ashore at Drogheda, County Louth. She was on a voyage from Liverpool, Lancashire to Drogheda. She was refloated and taken in to Drogheda
Isadora	United Kingdom	The ship was wrecked on the Sunk Sand, in the North Sea off the coast of Essex. Her crew were rescued. She was on a voyage from Newcastle upon Tyne, Northumberland to Santander, Spain.
Johanna	Prussia	The schooner ran aground and was severely damaged at Wells-next-the-Sea, Norfolk, United Kingdom. She was on a voyage from Memel to Wells-next-the-Sea.
Margaret Dewer	United Kingdom	The barque was wrecked on Cape Sable Island, Nova Scotia, British North America. Her crew were rescued. She was on a voyage from Glasgow, Renfrewshire to New York, United States.
Pester	Norway	The ship was driven ashore near Isigny-sur-Mer, Manche, France.

== 7 September ==
List of shipwrecks: 7 September 1851
Ship	State	Description
Apollo	United Kingdom	The steamship was wrecked on the Kentish Knock. All 55 people on board were rescued by the smack Maria (United Kingdom). Apollo was on a voyage from Rotterdam, South Holland, Netherlands to London.
Ceres	Prussia	The ship was in collision with Planet (United Kingdom) and sank in the North Sea. Her crew were rescued by Planet. Ceres was on a voyage from Newcastle upon Tyne, Northumberland, United Kingdom to Pillau.
John	United Kingdom	The ship was abandoned in the Atlantic Ocean. Her crew were rescued. She was on a voyage from New York, United States to Hull, Yorkshire.
Montreal	United States	The ship ran aground on the Newcombe Sands, in the English Channel off the coast of Kent, United Kingdom. She was on a voyage from Gothenburg, Sweden to Boston, Massachusetts. She was refloated and taken in to Portsmouth, Hampshire, United Kingdom in a leaky condition.
Nouveau Justin	France	The ship sprang a leak and was beached on the east coast of Barbuda. Her crew were rescued. She was on a voyage from Martinique to Marseille, Bouches-du-Rhône.
William and Mary	United Kingdom	The trow was in collision with the steamship Propeller (United Kingdom) and sank in the River Avon.

== 8 September ==
List of shipwrecks: 8 September 1851
Ship	State	Description
Fairy	(United Kingdom of Great Britain and Ireland) Van Diemen's Land	The schooner was wrecked at Tasman Head with the loss of three lives. She was on a voyage from Hobart to Circular Head.
Regard	United Kingdom	The ship ran aground at Helsingør, Denmark. She was on a voyage from Saint Petersburg, Russia to London. She was refloated and resumed her voyage.

== 9 September ==
List of shipwrecks: 9 September 1851
Ship	State	Description
Abigail	United States	The schooner was wrecked on a reef north of Bermuda. Her crew were rescued. She was on a voyage from Baltimore, Maryland to Saint Lucia.
Europa	Stettin	The ship ran aground on the Burbo Bank, in Liverpool Bay. She was on a voyage from Liverpool, Lancashire, United Kingdom to Stettin. She was refloated and resumed her voyage.
Guardian	United Kingdom	The ship sprang a leak and sank off Glenarm, County Antrim. Her crew were rescued. She was on a voyage from Liverpool to Ballina, County Mayo.
Guerandis	France	The ship was driven ashore at Saint-Nazaire, Loire-Inférieure.
Mary	United Kingdom	The ship ran aground at Helsingør, Denmark. She was on a voyage from London to Stettin. She was refloated and resumed her voyage.

== 10 September ==
List of shipwrecks: 10 September 1851
Ship	State	Description
Abercromby	United Kingdom	The ship was abandoned in the Atlantic Ocean. Her crew were rescued by George Robinson (United Kingdom). Abercromby was on a voyage from Liverpool, Lancashire to Montreal, Province of Canada, British North America.
Manuelita	Spain	The schooner was lost between Ruatan and "Buenaca Island", British Honduras. Her crew were rescued. She was on a voyage from Sisal, Mexico to Havana, Cuba.
Osprey	United Kingdom	The ship was driven ashore between Tarbert, County Kerry and "Glynn".
Robert and Betsey	United Kingdom	The ship was driven ashore at Hela, Prussia. Her crew were rescued. She was on a voyage from Sunderland, County Durham to a Baltic port. Robert and Betsey was refloated on 13 October and taken in to Danzig.

== 11 September ==
List of shipwrecks: 11 September 1851
Ship	State	Description
Ellen	United Kingdom	The ship arrived at Montevideo, Uruguay with her cargo of coal on fire and was scuttled.
Lafayette	United States	The steamship was destroyed by fire at Chagres, Republic of Colombia with the loss of one of the 74 people on board. She was on a voyage from New York to Nicaragua.
Martha Anne	United Kingdom	The brig sprang a leak and foundered in the Atlantic Ocean (36°56′N 10°20′W. Her crew were rescued by the brig Romance (United Kingdom). She was on a voyage from Newcastle upon Tyne, Northumberland to Galaţi, Ottoman Empire.
Victoria	Prussia	The brig was driven ashore on Martha's Vineyard, Massachusetts, United States. She was on a voyage from New York, United States to Saint John, New Brunswick, British North America. She was refloated on 13 September and taken in to Edgartown, Massachusetts.
Westmoreland	United Kingdom	The brig ran aground and sank in the River Wear. She was refloated and towed in to Sunderland, County Durham.

== 12 September ==
List of shipwrecks: 12 September 1851
Ship	State	Description
Clarence	(United Kingdom of Great Britain and Ireland) British North America	The ship was driven ashore on the north point of Grand Turk Island. Her crew were rescued. She was on a voyage from Saint Vincent to the Turks Islands. She was refloated the next day.
Clarinda	United Kingdom	The ship was driven ashore at De Moville Point, Cape Colony. She was on a voyage from South Shields, County Durham to Algoa Bay.
Standard	United Kingdom	The brig was wrecked in the Turks Islands. Her crew were rescued.
St. Kiaran	United Kingdom	The paddle steamer ran aground at Dove Point, Cheshire. She was on a voyage from Liverpool, Lancashire to Dublin. She was refloated the next day and resumed her voyage.

== 13 September ==
List of shipwrecks: 13 September 1851
Ship	State	Description
Anna Maria	(United Kingdom of Great Britain and Ireland) New South Wales	The schooner was wrecked at Newcastle.
Chance	(United Kingdom of Great Britain and Ireland) New South Wales	The ketch was wrecked at Bungaree Noragh Point.
George Henry Harrison	United Kingdom	The brigantine was driven ashore and wrecked in Plettenberg Bay.
Hargrave	United Kingdom	The full-rigged ship was wrecked on Cape Sable Island, Nova Scotia, British North America. Her crew were rescued. She was on a voyage from Newport, Monmouthshire to New York, United States.
Leinster Lass	United Kingdom	The paddle steamer was driven ashore in the New Deep, in the River Boyne. She was on a voyage from Drogheda, County Louth to Liverpool, Lancashire. She was refloated the next day and resumed her voyage.
St Helena	United Kingdom	The East Indiaman was wrecked in Plettenberg Bay off the coast of South Africa. Her crew survived.
Theodore	United Kingdom	The ship was in collision with a flat, which drove her anchor through her bows, and was consequently beached at Runcorn, Cheshire. The flat was also beached. Theodore was on a voyage from Shoreham-by-Sea, Sussex to Runcorn.

== 14 September ==
List of shipwrecks: 14 September 1851
Ship	State	Description
Lady Adelaide	United Kingdom	The schooner was driven ashore and wrecked south of Beadnell, Northumberland. Her crew were rescued.
Lady Constable	United Kingdom	The ship was driven ashore and wrecked at Richibucto, New Brunswick. She was on a voyage from Liverpool, Lancashire to Richibucto.
Memnon	United States	The full-rigged ship was wrecked on a reef in the Gaspar Strait. Her crew survived and were rescued a few days later by Jeremiah Garnett (United Kingdom). Memnon was on her maiden voyage, from Hong Kong to London, United Kingdom.
San Giorgio	Kingdom of the Two Sicilies	The brig struck the Crom Rocks, off the Isles of Scilly, United Kingdom, capsized and was abandoned. Her crew were rescued. She was on a voyage from "Gioja" to Hamburg. San Giorgio subsequently floated off, and was taken in to the Isles of Scilly on 25 September.
Times	United Kingdom	The steamship ran aground in the River Liffey. She was on a voyage from Dublin to Liverpool, Lancashire. She was refloated.

== 16 September ==
List of shipwrecks: 16 September 1851
Ship	State	Description
Albinia	(United Kingdom of Great Britain and Ireland) Cape Colony	The schooner was driven ashore and wrecked at Port Elizabeth. She was on a voyage from Port Natal to East London.
City of Manchester	United Kingdom	The ship ran aground on The Skerries, Anglesey. She was on a voyage from Philadelphia, Pennsylvania, United States to Liverpool, Lancashire. She was refloated and taken in to Liverpool.
Friends	United Kingdom	The schooner struck the Runnel Stone and foundered. Her crew were rescued. She was on a voyage from a Welsh port to St. Ives, Cornwall.
Isabella	United Kingdom	The ship sprang a leak and foundered in the North Sea 40 nautical miles (74 km) south west of the mouth of the Humber. Her crew were rescued. She was on a voyage from Castlehill, County Mayo to London.

== 17 September ==
List of shipwrecks: 17 September 1851
Ship	State	Description
Aladdin	United Kingdom	The full-rigged ship was wrecked near Cape St. Paul, Chile. Her crew were rescued. She was on a voyage from Antwerp, Belgium to Valparaíso, Chile.
Brilliant	United Kingdom	The paddle steamer was driven ashore in the Humber. She was on a voyage from Hull to Leith, Lothian.
Garland	United Kingdom	The ship was driven ashore in the Scheldt.
Lascar	United Kingdom	The full-rigged ship was wrecked near Saugor, India with the loss of two of her crew. She was on a voyage from Hull to Calcutta, India.
Speculation	Lübeck	The ship was driven ashore near Danzig. She was on a voyage from Königsberg, Prussia to Lübeck. She was refloated on 20 September and taken in to Danzig.

== 18 September ==
List of shipwrecks: 18 September 1851
Ship	State	Description
William	United Kingdom	The ship sank at Whitby, Yorkshire.

== 19 September ==
List of shipwrecks: 19 September 1851
Ship	State	Description
Augusta Henriette	Prussia	The ship ran aground on the Lillegrund. She was on a voyage from Memel to Cardiff, Glamorgan, United Kingdom. She was refloated the next day and taken in to Copenhagen, Denmark.
Fernando Septimo	Spain	The ship was wrecked at Cape San Blas, Florida, United States.

== 20 September ==
List of shipwrecks: 20 September 1851
Ship	State	Description
Perseverance	United Kingdom	The ship ran aground on the Oster Sandbank, in the North Sea off the coast of Zeeland, Netherlands. She was on a voyage from Newcastle upon Tyne, Northumberland to Rotterdam, South Holland, Netherlands. She was refloated and put in to Brouwershaven, Zeeland in a leaky condition.
Sophia	Danzig	The ship sand in the Baltic Sea off the coast of Prussia. She was on a voyage from Danzig to Stettin.
Sophie	Russian Empire	The ship was wrecked on a reef off Çeşme, Ottoman Empire. She was on a voyage from Odesa to Constantinople, Ottoman Empire.

== 21 September ==
List of shipwrecks: 21 September 1851
Ship	State	Description
Birmingham	United Kingdom	The ship ran aground on the Burbo Bank, in Liverpool Bay. She was on a voyage from Dublin to Liverpool, Lancashire. She was refloated and completed her voyage.
Camilla, and Venus	United Kingdom	The ships were jammed together in the entrance to Bute Docks, Cardiff, Glamorgan. Camilla sank. She was refloated on 23 September and anchored off Penarth, Glamorgan. Venus was severely damaged; she was beached at Penarth.
Tongahatoo	(United Kingdom of Great Britain and Ireland) British North America	The ship ran aground and was severely damaged at Port Hood, Nova Scotia. She was on a voyage from Pugwash, Nova Scotia to Liverpool.
Yarm	United Kingdom	The brig was driven ashore at Dieppe, Seine-Inférieure, France. She was on a voyage from Stockton-on-Tees, County Durham to Dieppe. Yarm had become a wreck by 25 September.
William	United Kingdom	The ship was towed in to "Snarsaet", Norway in a sinking condition. She was on a voyage from Arkhangelsk, Russia to London. She was consequently condemned.

== 22 September ==
List of shipwrecks: 22 September 1851
Ship	State	Description
Indus	United Kingdom	The ship arrived at Rio de Janeiro, Brazil from Dundee, Forfarshire with her cargo of coal on fire and was scuttled.

== 23 September ==
List of shipwrecks: 23 September 1851
Ship	State	Description
Lübeck	Norway	The ship ran aground off Farø, Denmark. She was refloated and resumed her voyage.

== 24 September ==
List of shipwrecks: 24 September 1851
Ship	State	Description
Anna Mary	United Kingdom	The ship ran aground and capsized at Carlisle, Cumberland. She was on a voyage from Quebec City, Province of Canada, British North America to Carlisle.
Anne	United Kingdom	The ship departed from Newcastle upon Tyne, Northumberland for Torbay, Devon. No further trace, presumed foundered with the loss of all hands.
Bentley	United Kingdom	The ship was driven ashore on Osmussaar, Russia. She was refloated the next day and taken in to Kronstadt, Russia.
Dove	United Kingdom	The schooner was run down and sunk in the River Mersey off Monk's Ferry, Cheshire by the steamship Fanny (United Kingdom). Her crew survived. She was on a voyage from Runcorn, Cheshire to Dungarvan, County Waterford. Dove subsequently refloated herself when her cargo of salt dissolved and drifted out to sea. She was taken in to Birkenhead by the steamship Britannia (United Kingdom).
Hellena	United Kingdom	The ship was wrecked on the Lobeira Rocks, south of Viana do Castelo, Portugal. She was on a voyage from Galaţi, Ottoman Empire to Queenstown, County Cork.
Highlander	(United Kingdom of Great Britain and Ireland) Jersey	The brigantine was driven ashore and damaged on the Punta Candor Rocks, near Rota, Spain. She was on a voyage from Jersey to Cádiz, Spain and Montevideo, Uruguay. She was refloated and taken in to Cádiz for repairs.
Oquendo	Spain	The brig was wrecked on a reef off Rapu-rapu Island, Spanish East Indies.
Rookery	United Kingdom	The ship ran aground on a reef off Kalmar, Sweden. She was on a voyage from Hull, Yorkshire to Saint Petersburg, Russia. She was refloated on 26 September and taken in to Kalmar.

== 25 September ==
List of shipwrecks: 25 September 1851
Ship	State	Description
Aid	United Kingdom	The ship was driven ashore and severely damaged at Aberporth, Cardiganshire.
Aid	United Kingdom	The sloop was driven ashore between the mouth of the River Tees and Redcar, Yorkshire. Her crew were rescued.
America	United Kingdom	The flat was abandoned in the Victoria Channel. Her crew were rescued by the fishing smack Dolphin (United Kingdom). She was on a voyage from Rhyl, Denbighshire to Preston, Lancashire.
Ami	United Kingdom	The brig was wrecked in the Humber. Her crew were rescued by a schooner.
Ann and Mary	United Kingdom	The ship was driven ashore at Fishguard, Pembrokeshire.
Apollo	Prussia	The schooner was driven ashore between the mouth of the River Tees and Redcar. Her crew were rescued. She was on a voyage from Grimsby, Lincolnshire to Newcastle upon Tyne, Northumberland.
Bee	United Kingdom	The sloop was driven ashore and wrecked at Clee Ness, Lincolnshire. Her crew were rescued by Osprey (United Kingdom).
Berkeley	(United Kingdom of Great Britain and Ireland) Jersey	The ketch was wrecked on the Ecréhou Rocks, off Jersey. Her crew survived.
Britannia	United Kingdom	The brig was driven ashore and wrecked in the Paraíba do Norte River, Brazil. Her crew were rescued.
Britannia	United Kingdom	The tug was driven ashore and wrecked between the mouth of the River Tees and Redcar. Her crew were rescued.
Britannica	United Kingdom	The ship foundered in the North Sea with the loss of all hands.
Charming Nancy	United Kingdom	The ship was driven ashore and sank at Fishguard. She was on a voyage from Cardigan to Milford Haven, Pembrokeshire.
Chatham	United Kingdom	The sloop was wrecked at Sandhale, Lincolnshire. Her crew were rescued. She was on a voyage from Newcastle upon Tyne, Northumberland to Caen, Calvados, France.
Diligence	United Kingdom	The ship was driven ashore at Fishguard. She was on a voyage from Aberavon, Glamorgan to Milford Haven, Pembrokeshire. She was subsequently severely damaged when Mary, Mary and Eliza and Myra (all United Kingdom) drove into her.
Edward	United Kingdom	The ship was driven ashore at Seaton Sluice, County Durham. She was refloated on 14 October and taken in to Blyth, Northumberland.
Eliza	United Kingdom	The ship foundered in the North Sea. Her crew were rescued by Chanticleer (United Kingdom). Eliza was on a voyage from Middlesbrough, Yorkshire to the Burntisland, Fife.
Eliza	United Kingdom	The schooner ran aground on the Burbo Bank, in Liverpool Bay with the loss of three of her four crew. Her captain was rescued by the steamship Iron Duke (United Kingdom). Eliza was on a voyage from Preston to Liverpool, Lancashire.
Elizabeth and Sarah	United Kingdom	The sloop was driven ashore between the mouth of the River Tees and Redcar. Her crew were rescued.
Ellen	United Kingdom	The ship foundered in the North Sea off Flamborough Head, Yorkshire. Her crew were rescued by Boyne (United Kingdom).
Ellen Dole	United Kingdom	The ship was driven ashore and severely damaged at Goodwick, Pembrokeshire. She was on a voyage from Aberystwyth, Cardiganshire to "Aberdoe". She was refloated.
Euphemia	United Kingdom	The brig was wrecked on the Navestone Rock, off the coast of Northumberland. Her crew were rescued. Euphemia was on a voyage from Dundee, Forfarshire to Sunderland. She subsequently came ashore at Sandsend, Yorkshire.
Fair Helen	United Kingdom	The sloop was wrecked at the entrance to Lough Larne.
Falcon	United Kingdom	The brig foundered in the North Sea off Immanuel Head, Northumberland with the loss of all eight people on board. She was on a voyage from Aberdeen to Stettin, or Stettin to Grangemouth, Stirlingshire.
Farce	United Kingdom	The ship foundered in the North Sea with the loss of all hands.
Friends	United Kingdom	The ship was driven ashore at Robin Hoods Bay, Yorkshire.
Hambro'	United Kingdom	The ship was driven ashore and wrecked 5 nautical miles (9.3 km) south of Scarborough, Yorkshire. Her crew were rescued.
Hope	United Kingdom	The schooner was driven ashore and wrecked at Whitby, Yorkshire
Humility	United Kingdom	The sloop capsized, was driven ashore and wrecked at Scarborough. Her crew were rescued by a coble.
Isabella	United Kingdom	The schooner was driven ashore and wrecked at Scarborough. Her crew were rescued.
Isabella	United Kingdom	The sloop was wrecked at Redcar. Her crew were rescued.
Jane	United Kingdom	The ship foundered in the North Sea with the loss of all hands.
Juno	Kingdom of Hanover	The galiot was driven ashore between the mouth of the River Tees and Redcar. Her crew were rescued.
Lady Saltoun	United Kingdom	The ship was driven out to sea from Coquet Island, Northumberland. No further trace, presumed foundered with the loss of all hands. She was on a voyage from South Shields, County Durham to Hamburg.
Lady Zetland	United Kingdom	The schooner was driven ashore and wrecked between the mouth of the River Tees and Redcar. Her crew were rescued.
Letitia Heyn	United Kingdom	The ship was driven ashore at House Harbour, Magdalen Islands, Province of Canada, British North America. She was on a voyage from Quebec City, Province of Canada to Liverpool.
Lively	United Kingdom	The ship was driven ashore at Fishguard.
Lydia	United Kingdom	The brig was driven ashore and wrecked north of Flamborough Head. Her crew were rescued. She was on a voyage from Seaham, County Durham to London.
Madeira	United Kingdom	The sloop foundered in the North Sea. Two of her crew had been washed overboard and drowned the previous night. The captain's wife drowned, her mate was rescued by the fishing smack Northstone (United Kingdom).
Margaret	United Kingdom	The schooner was wrecked at Lindisfarne, Northumberland. Her crew were rescued. She was on a voyage from Cromarty to Sunderland, County Durham.
Margaret and Ann	United Kingdom	The sloop was wrecked in the Islestone Rocks, near Bamborough Castle, Northumberland. Her crew were rescued.
Maria	Kingdom of Hanover	The ship was driven ashore between the mouth of the River Tees and Redcar. Her crew were rescued. She was on a voyage from Hamburg to Middlesbrough, Yorkshire.
Mary	United Kingdom	The brig was driven ashore and wrecked at Whitby.
Mary Ann	United Kingdom	The ship was driven ashore at Fishguard, colliding with Diligence (United Kingdom). She was severely damaged, but was later refloated.
Mary Gray	United Kingdom	The schooner was driven ashore and wrecked at Hartlepool, County Durham. Her crew were rescued by the Coast Guard using rocket apparatus. She was on a voyage from Aberdeen to Hartlepool.
Mary Jane	United Kingdom	The tug was wrecked at Redcar. Her crew were rescued.
Meridian	United Kingdom	The brig was driven ashore and wrecked at Redcar. Her crew were rescued.
Mermaid	United Kingdom	The smack sank off the coast of Caernarfonshire. All on board survived. She was on a voyage from Caernarfon to Dublin.
Morning Star	United Kingdom	The sloop was driven ashore at Sandsend.
Napoleon	France	The schooner was driven ashore between the mouth of the River Tees and Redcar with the loss of one of her ten crew. Survivors were rescued by Carte's rocket apparatus.
Neptune	United Kingdom	The ship was driven ashore at Fishguard.
Ocean	United Kingdom	The smack was driven ashore at Aberporth. She was on a voyage from Falmouth, Cornwall to Liverpool. She was refloated on 4 October and taken in to Cardigan in a severely damaged condition.
Osprey	United Kingdom	The smack was driven ashore at Fishguard. She was on a voyage from Cardiff, Glamorgan to Liverpool. She was refloated and resumed her voyage.
Owen Glendower	United Kingdom	The yacht was wrecked in Galway Bay. All fifteen people on board were rescued by the barque John (Russia).
Parana	United Kingdom	The steamship was abandoned 10 nautical miles (19 km) west of the Isles of Scilly. She was being towed from Southampton, Hampshire to Greenock, Renfrewshire by the tug Ellen Fawcett' (United Kingdom).
Peak	United Kingdom	The ship was driven ashore at Robin Hoods Bay.
Pheasant	United Kingdom	The ship was driven ashore at Fishguard.
Phœnix	United Kingdom	The ship was driven ashore and wrecked 3 nautical miles (5.6 km) south of Seaham. Her crew were rescued.
Pierre Desiré	France	The ship was driven ashore at Dunkirk, Nord.
Proteus	Prussia	The brig was driven ashore at Cemlyn, Anglesey, United Kingdom. Her crew were rescued. She was on a voyage from Kronstadt to Liverpool.
Providence	United Kingdom	The schooner was driven ashore at Aberporth. She was refloated on 4 October and taken in to New Quay, Cardiganshire for repairs.
Roman	United States	The ship was driven ashore on Naissaar, Russia. She was on a voyage from Boston, Massachusetts to Kronstadt. She was refloated and taken in to Kronstadt.
Rousseau	United Kingdom	The brig was wrecked at Hartlepool with the loss of two of her seven crew. Survivors were rescued by the West Hartlepool Lifeboat. She was on a voyage from the River Tyne to Dundee, Forfarshire.
Seagull	United Kingdom	The schooner was driven ashore at Peel, Isle of Man. Her crew were rescued. She was on a voyage from Harrington, Cumberland to Belfast, County Antrim.
St. Catherine	United Kingdom	The brig capsized in the North Sea between Flamborough Head, Yorkshire and the Humber with the loss of a crew member. Survivors were rescued the next day. She was taken in to Great Yarmouth, Norfolk in a derelict condition on 28 September.
Supply	United Kingdom	The brig was run into by the brig Henry and Harriet (United Kingdom) in Bridlington Bay and was severely damaged. Four of her crew got aboard Henry and Harriet. Supply was towed in to Bridlington.
Trial	United Kingdom	The sloop was driven ashore between the mouth of the River Tees and Redcar. Her crew were rescued. She was on a voyage from Liverpool to Newcastle upon Tyne.
Triton	United Kingdom	The schooner sank in the Humber. Her crew were rescued by the schooner Ann (United Kingdom). Triton was on a voyage from Newcastle upon Tyne to Teignmouth, Devon.
Triton	United Kingdom	The ship was wrecked near Kettleness, Yorkshire with the loss of all hands.
Triton	United Kingdom	The steamship ran onto the breakwater at Ostend, West Flanders, Belgium. All 180 people on board were rescued.
Two Sisters	United Kingdom	The sloop was driven ashore between the mouth of the River Tees and Redcar. Her crew were rescued.
Union	United Kingdom	The ship was driven ashore and severely damaged at Aberporth.
Venus	United Kingdom	The brig foundered in the North Sea 10 nautical miles (19 km) north of the Dudgeon Sandbank with the loss of all hands.
Victoire	France	The ship was driven ashore and wrecked at Dunkirk.
Vine	United Kingdom	The ship was driven ashore at North Berwick, Berwickshire. Her crew were rescued.
Wave	United Kingdom	The ship foundered in the North Sea with the loss of all hands.
Whitwell Grange	United Kingdom	The ship was driven ashore at Redcar. Her crew were rescued. She was on a voyage from London to South Shields. She was refloated on 24 October and completed her voyage.
William and Mary	United Kingdom	The ship was driven ashore between the mouth of the River Tees and Redcar. Her crew were rescued. She was on a voyage from King's Lynn, Norfolk to Hartlepool.

== 26 September ==
List of shipwrecks: 26 September 1851
Ship	State	Description
Aid	United Kingdom	The sloop was driven ashore and severely damaged at Beadnell, Northumberland. Her crew were rescued. She was on a voyage from Hartlepool, County Durham to Port Dundas, Renfrewshire.
Amerigo Vespucci	Ottoman Empire	The brig ran aground at Moville, County Donegal, United Kingdom.
Ann Coppin	United Kingdom	The schooner ran aground at Moville.
Apollo	United Kingdom	The ship was driven ashore between the mouth of the River Tees and Saltburn, Yorkshire. She was on a voyage from Grimsby, Lincolnshire to Newcastle upon Tyne, Northumberland. She was refloated on 24 October and taken in to Middlesbrough, Yorkshire.
Bentley Hill	United Kingdom	The ship was driven ashore on Osmussaar, Russia.
Carter	United Kingdom	The ship was driven ashore and wrecked at Skinningrove, Yorkshire. Her crew were rescued.
Ceres	United Kingdom	The ship sank off the Copeland Islands, County Antrim. She was on a voyage from Ardrossan, Ayrshire to Belfast, County Antrim.
Cobden	United Kingdom	The sloop foundered in the North Sea at the mouth of the Humber. Her crew were rescued. She was on a voyage from Wisbech, Cambridgeshire to Leeds or Wakefield, Yorkshire. Cobden was refloated on 14 October and taken in to Grimsby.
Courier	France	The ship was abandoned in the North Sea between the mouth of the Humber and the Dudgeon Sandbank. Her crew were rescued. She was on a voyage from Blyth, Northumberland to Algiers, Algeria.
Daniel Brock	United Kingdom	The ship foundered in the North Sea off Flamborough Head, Yorkshire. Her crew were rescued by the smack Comet (United Kingdom). Daniel Brock was on a voyage from South Shields, County Durham to Jersey, Channel Islands.
Eliza	United Kingdom	The schooner ran aground and sank on the Burbo Bank, in Liverpool Bay with the loss of three of her four crew. The survivor was rescued by the steamship Iron Duke (United Kingdom). Eliza was on a voyage from Troon, Ayrshire to Liverpool, Lancashire.
Eliza and James	United Kingdom	The ship foundered in the North Sea south east of the Dudgeon Sand. Her crew were rescued.
Ellen	United Kingdom	The ship was abandoned in the North Sea off Flamborough Head. Her crew were rescued.
Elvin and Jane	United Kingdom	The ship foundered in the North Sea south east of the Dudgeon Sandbank. Her crew were rescued.
Falcon	United Kingdom	The ship departed from London for Montrose, Forfarshire. No further trace, presumed foundered with the loss of all hands.
Friends	United Kingdom	The ship was wrecked at Whitby, Yorkshire. Her crew were rescued.
Friend's Goodwill	United Kingdom	The ship was driven ashore at Sandsend, Yorkshire. Her crew were rescued.
Fuentria	Rostock	The ship was abandoned in the Firth of Forth. She was on a voyage from Rostock to Leith, Lothian, United Kingdom. She was subsequently taken in to Leith.
Guide	Flag unknown	The tug collided with Fire Queen (United Kingdom) and sank in the Bosphorus.
Hannah Isabella	United Kingdom	The brig was wrecked on the Inner Dowsing Sand, in the North Sea. Her crew were rescued. She was on a voyage from Aberdeen to London.
Jane	United Kingdom	The smack was driven ashore and wrecked west of Appledore, Devon with the loss of a crew member. She was on a voyage from Gloucester to Barnstaple, Devon.
Jasper	United Kingdom	The ship was abandoned in the North Sea. Her crew were rescued. She was on a voyage from Sunderland, County Durham to London.
Louisa and Mary	United Kingdom	The ship was driven ashore on the east coast of Öland, Sweden. She was later refloated.
Madeira	United Kingdom	The sloop foundered in the North Sea. Her crew were rescued by a brig. She was on a voyage from Woodbridge, Suffolk to Goole, Yorkshire.
Mary and Anns	United Kingdom	The ship was driven ashore and wrecked at Skinningrove. Her crew were rescued.
New Good Intent	United Kingdom	The ship foundered in the North Sea with the loss of all hands. She was on a voyage from Boston, Lincolnshire to Newcastle upon Tyne.
Orb	United Kingdom	The smack sprang a leak and sank off Bolt Head, Devon. Her three crew took to a boat. They were rescued by the six-oared gig Betsey (United Kingdom). Orb was on a voyage from Falmouth, Cornwall to Hull, Yorkshire.
Pomona	United Kingdom	The brig foundered in the North Sea 15 nautical miles (28 km) east of the Dudgeon Sandbank with the loss of all on board.
Scarborough	United Kingdom	The ship was wrecked at Whitby.
Seven Brothers	United Kingdom	The brig was wrecked on the Leman Sand, in the North Sea with the loss of nine of the fourteen people on board. Survivors were rescued by the pilot cutter Whim (United Kingdom).
St. Pierre	France	The ship was driven ashore and wrecked in the Risle.
Trientze	Kingdom of Hanover	The galiot was abandoned off the Isle of May, United Kingdom. Her crew were rescued by the brig Nymphen (United Kingdom). Trintze was on a voyage from Rostock to Leith. She was taken in to Leith on 1 October.
Tryall	United Kingdom	The schooner was driven ashore and wrecked at Montrose, Forfarshire. Her seven crew were rescued. She was on a voyage from Liverpool to Newcastle upon Tyne.
Wanskapen	Sweden	The ship ran aground off "Syltholmen", Denmark. Her crew were rescued.
Wellington	United Kingdom	The ship ran aground on the Cromer Knowl, in the North Sea and was abandoned with the loss of her captain. Survivors took to the boats; they were rescued by the sloop Sarah (United Kingdom). Wellington was on a voyage from Newcastle upon Tyne and/or Seaham, County Durham to Lowestoft, Suffolk. Wellington was towed in to Hull on 28 September.
Welton	United Kingdom	The ship was abandoned on the Winterton Ridge, in the North Sea off the coast of Norfolk. Her crew were rescued by a brig. She was on a voyage from Saint Petersburg, Russia to London.
William	United Kingdom	The brig was wrecked on the coast of Northumberland. Her crew were rescued. She was on a voyage from Aberdeen to Hartlepool, County Durham.
Young Mary	United Kingdom	The ship sank in the North Sea. She was on a voyage from Goole to Maldon, Essex. She was refloated on 6 October and taken in to Grimsby.

== 27 September ==
List of shipwrecks: 27 September 1851
Ship	State	Description
Bramin	United States	Crippled in a collision in the Chukchi Sea with the whaling bark Adeline (flag unknown) during a snowstorm on 25 September, the 245-ton whaling bark was wrecked on the coast of Siberia 100 nautical miles (190 km; 120 mi) from East Cape (now Cape Dezhnev) during a gale. Adeline rescued her crew.
Charles Henry	United Kingdom	The brig was abandoned in the North Sea. Her crew were rescued by the barque Tweed (United Kingdom). Charles Henry was on a voyage from London to Sunderland, County Durham. She was discovered by the lugger Nelly (France) on 30 September and taken in to Grimsby, Lincolnshire.
Crusader	United Kingdom	The brig foundered in the North Sea off the mouth of the Humber. Her eight crew were rescued by the schooner Louise (Russia). She was on a voyage from Stockton-on-Tees, County Durham to London.
Ebenezer	United Kingdom	The schooner departed from Lowestoft, Suffolk for Sunderland, County Durham. No further trace, presumed foundered with the loss of all hands.
Eliza and Catherine	(United Kingdom of Great Britain and Ireland) Isle of Man	The ship was driven ashore at the Point of Ayre Lighthouse with the loss of her captain. She was on a voyage from the Strangford Lough to Runcorn, Cheshire.
Eliza Frances	United Kingdom	The ship ran aground at the mouth of the Rio Grande and was abandoned by her crew. She was on a voyage from the Rio Grande to Queenstown, County Cork.
Lark	United Kingdom	The smack was driven ashore in Glenarm Bay.
Margaret	United Kingdom	The sloop was driven ashore in Glenarm Bay.
Penguin	United Kingdom	The ship was abandoned in the North Sea. Her crew were rescued by Ariel (United Kingdom). Penguin was on a voyage from Blyth, Northumberland to Calais, France.
Phantom	(United Kingdom of Great Britain and Ireland) South Australia	The ship was driven ashore at Point Malcolm.
Phœbe	United Kingdom	The ship was abandoned in the North Sea 80 nautical miles (150 km) east of Winterton-on-Sea, Norfolk. Her crew were rescued. She was on a voyage from London to Middlesbrough, Yorkshire. Phœbe came ashore on Texel, North Holland, Netherlands on 3 October. She was declared a total loss.
Platina	United Kingdom	The sloop was driven ashore at Wexford. She was on a voyage from Bangor to Wexford. Platina was refloated on 2 October.
Progress	United Kingdom	The ship was abandoned in the North Sea. Her crew were rescued by Oak (United Kingdom). Progress was on a voyage from Newcastle upon Tyne, Northumberland to Poole. Dorset.
Ross	United Kingdom	The ship was driven ashore on Hogland, Russia. She was on a voyage from Saint Petersburg, Russia to Hull, Yorkshire. She was refloated and resumed her voyage.
Utilla	United Kingdom	The ship foundered in the North Sea with the loss of all hands. She was on a voyage from Boston, Lincolnshire to Newcastle upon Tyne.
Welton	United Kingdom	The ship was driven ashore and wrecked at Winterton-on-Sea, Norfolk. She was on a voyage from Saint Petersburg, Russia to London.

== 28 September ==
List of shipwrecks: 28 September 1851
Ship	State	Description
Albatross	United Kingdom	The steamship ran aground in the Scheldt at Calloo, Belgium. She was on a voyage from Antwerp, Belgium to Hull, Yorkshire.
Alert	United Kingdom	The ship ran aground at Ramsey, Isle of Man. She was on a voyage from Dublin to Glasgow, Renfrewshire.
Anna Mary	United Kingdom	The ship was driven ashore at Carlisle, Cumberland. She was on a voyage from Quebec City, Province of Canada, British North America to Carlisle.
Barbara	United Kingdom	The schooner was wrecked at Boulmer, Northumberland. Her crew were rescued.
Brothers	United Kingdom	The ship was wrecked off Isle Madame, Nova Scotia, British North America. She was on a voyage from Prince Edward Island, British North America to Queenstown, County Cork.
Catherine	United Kingdom	The ship was wrecked at Whitby, Yorkshire. Her crew were rescued.
Hollands Trouw	Netherlands	The ship was wrecked on the Falsterbo Reef, in the Baltic Sea. She was on a voyage from Riga, Russia to Delfzijl, South Holland.
Judy	United Kingdom	The ship was driven ashore and wrecked at Newport, Monmouthshire.
Mary	United Kingdom	The ship ran aground at Ramsey and was severely damaged. She was on a voyage from Garlieston, Wigtownshire to Ramsey.
Monarch	United Kingdom	The brig capsized and was abandoned in the North Sea. Her crew were rescued by a smack. She was on a voyage from Quebec City, Province of Canada, British North America to Sunderland, County Durham. Monarch was towed in to Scarborough, Yorkshire.
Reward	United Kingdom	The brig ran aground on the Sizewell Bank, in the North Sea off the coast of Suffolk. She was on a voyage from Saint Petersburg, Russia to London. She was refloated and resumed her voyage.
Waverley	United Kingdom	The ship was wrecked at Thurso, Caithness. Her crew were rescued. She was on a voyage from Liverpool, Lancashire to Riga, Russia.

== 29 September ==
List of shipwrecks: 29 September 1851
Ship	State	Description
Brillant	United States	"Brillant" The steamboat suffered a boiler explosion on the Mississippi River by Bayou Goula, Louisiana killing 47 people.
Caledonia	United Kingdom	The schooner capsized at Stockton-on-Tees, County Durham. She was righted the next day.
Constantine	France	The ship departed from Havana, Cuba for Bordeaux, Gironde. No further trace, presumed foundered with the loss of all hands.
Dove	United Kingdom	The ship was driven ashore at Spurn Point, East Riding of Yorkshire.
Earl of Chatham	United Kingdom	The ship foundered in the Bristol Channel with the loss of two lives. Three crew were rescued. She was on a voyage from Charleston, South Carolina to Runcorn, Cheshire.
Emilie	Prussia	The brig sank off Skagen, Denmark. Her crew were rescued by Argo (Netherlands). Emilie was on a voyage from Seaham, County Durham to Stettin.
Favourite	United Kingdom	The ship was driven ashore at Sandsend, Yorkshire. Her crew were rescued. She was refloated on 7 October and taken in to Whitby.
Gardina	Lübeck	The ship was driven ashore 9 nautical miles (17 km) east of Stolpmünde, Kingdom of Prussia. She was on a voyage from Lübeck to Königsberg, Prussia.
Joseph Hutchinson	United Kingdom	The barque was abandoned in the Atlantic Ocean 30 to 40 nautical miles (56 to 74 km) north west of the Skellig Islands, County Kerry. Her twelve crew were rescued by Thomas (United Kingdom). Joseph Hutchinson was on a voyage from Alexandria, Egypt to Limerick.
Orford	United Kingdom	The brig was driven ashore in Dundrum Bay. Her crew were rescued. She was on a voyage from Workington, Cumberland to Dublin.
Sally	United Kingdom	The ship capsized at Neath, Glamorgan.
Triton	United Kingdom	The brig was wrecked between Sandsend and Whitby. Her crew were rescued.

== 30 September ==
List of shipwrecks: 30 September 1851
Ship	State	Description
Anne	United Kingdom	The ship struck the Lemon Sand, in the North Sea and was abandoned. Her crew were rescued.
Ant	United Kingdom	The sloop was destroyed by fire at Wigtown.
Ceres	United Kingdom	The ship ran aground in Placentia Bay. Her crew were rescued. She was on a voyage from Prince Edward Island, British North America to Queenstown, County Cork.
Equity	United Kingdom	The ship was driven ashore near Abersoch, Caernarfonshire. Her crew were rescued. She was on a voyage from Aberystwyth, Cardiganshire to Portmadoc, Caernarfonshire.
Fame	United Kingdom	The ship was driven ashore at Arklow, County Wicklow. Her crew were rescued. She had been refloated by 2 October and resumed her voyage.
Gaston	France	The ship was wrecked off Boa Vista, Cape Verde Islands. All on board were rescued. She was on a voyage from Port-Vendres, Pyrénées-Orientales to Pernambuco, Brazil.
Jane	United Kingdom	The ship ran aground and was wrecked in the Saint Lawrence River. Her crew were rescued. She was on a voyage from London to Quebec City, Province of Canada, British North America.
Orford	United Kingdom	The brig was driven ashore and wrecked in Dundrum Bay. She was on a voyage from Workington, Cumberland to Dublin.
Pallas	United Kingdom	The ship ran aground and was severely damaged at Hull, Yorkshire.
Paxton	United Kingdom	The brig was driven ashore on Cape Sable Island, Nova Scotia, British North America. She was on a voyage from Parrsboro, Nova Scotia to Liverpool, Lancashire. She was refloated and taken in to Clark's Harbour, Nova Scotia.
Royal Saxon	United Kingdom	The ship was driven ashore at Cape Town, Cape Colony. She was on a voyage from London to Cape Town.
Santos Preimo	Portugal	The ship was wrecked on White Island, British North America. Her crew were rescued. She was on a voyage from Porto to Quebec City.
Tanjore	United Kingdom	The ship was driven ashore on the east coast of Öland, Sweden. She was on a voyage from Kronstadt, Russian Empire to London.
Union	United Kingdom	The ship was abandoned in the Dogger Bank. Her crew were rescued by Iris (United Kingdom).
Victoria	United Kingdom	The ship was driven ashore Near Abersoch. Her crew were rescued. She was on a voyage from Aberystwyth to Portmadoc.

== Unknown date ==
List of shipwrecks: Unknown date in September 1851
Ship	State	Description
Acadia	United Kingdom	The ship foundered in the Atlantic Ocean. She was on a voyage from Mobile, Alabama, United States to Toulon, Var, France. A boat from the ship washed up at Key West, Florida, United States.
Adolfo	Sweden	The brig was damaged at Arecibo, Puerto Rico before 10 September.
Aldborough	United Kingdom	The ship was driven ashore north of Varberg, Sweden. She was on a voyage from Königsberg, Prussia to Hull, Yorkshire. She was refloated and put in to Varberg, arriving on 6 September.
Arthur	United Kingdom	The ship was abandoned in the North Sea with the loss of her captain. Survivors were rescued by the schooner Elizabeth (United Kingdom).
Bertha	Stettin	The ship was driven ashore whilst on a voyage from Stettin to Copenhagen, Denmark. She was refloated and put in to Griefswald, where she arrived on 20 September.
Boujah Maiden	(United Kingdom of Great Britain and Ireland) New South Wales	The schooner capsized off Point Henry, Victoria before 14 September with the loss of her captain.
Chance	United Kingdom	The ship was abandoned in the Atlantic Ocean south east of Cape Horn, Chile. Her crew survived. She was on a voyage from Liverpool, Lancashire to California, United States.
Clyde	United Kingdom	The brig was wrecked at Arecibo before 10 September.
Constantin	Sweden	The ship was driven ashore and severely damaged at Hamra, Gotland before 21 September. She was later refloated and taken in to Visby.
Eliza	France	The brig was lost in the Bissagos Islands. She was on a voyage from the Rio Nuñez to a French or Belgian port.
Foam	(United Kingdom of Great Britain and Ireland) Cape Colony	The schooner was wrecked at East London between 12 and 14 September.
Frederick	United Kingdom	The brig was wrecked at Arecibo before 10 September.
Friends	United Kingdom	The smack was abandoned off the coast of Cornwall before 14 September.
Grazioso	France	The ship was driven ashore on the coast of the Grand Duchy of Tuscany before 18 September. Her crew were rescued.
Marie	Prussia	The ship was wrecked 14 nautical miles (26 km) from Portland Bay, New South Wales before 6 September with the loss of all but one of her crew. She was on a voyage from Adelaide, South Australia to Melbourne, New South Wales.
Mary	United Kingdom	The brig was wrecked at Arecibo before 10 September.
Raven	United Kingdom	The ship was driven ashore on Hogland, Russia. She was on a voyage from Sunderland to Kronstadt, Russia. She was refloated and completed her voyage, arriving at Kronstadt on 8 September.
Scotia	United Kingdom	The brig was wrecked at Arecibo before 10 September.
Sofia	Greece	The ship struck a sunken rock near Çeşme, Ottoman Empire and was wrecked.
Three Sisters	United Kingdom	The ship was lost in the White Sea near "Polonga", Russia before 20 September.
Undaunted	United Kingdom	The brig was abandoned in the Baltic Sea before 14 September. She was on a voyage from South Shields, County Durham to Kronstadt. She was discovered by Ruby (United Kingdom) and sank on that day.
Vesta	United Kingdom	The ship was driven ashore at Kinsale, County Cork. She was on a voyage from Jamaica to Liverpool. She was refloated and taken in to Queenstown, County Cork, where she arrived on 15 September.
Ville d'Abbeville	France	The brig was lost near Gallipoli, Ottoman Empire before 6 September. She was on a voyage from Odesa to Falmouth, Cornwall or Queenstown, County Cork, United Kingdom.
Wilson	United Kingdom	The ship was abandoned in the North Sea before 28 September.
