= Church of St Oswald, Lythe =

Anglican church in North Yorkshire, England

- St Oswald's Church, Lythe
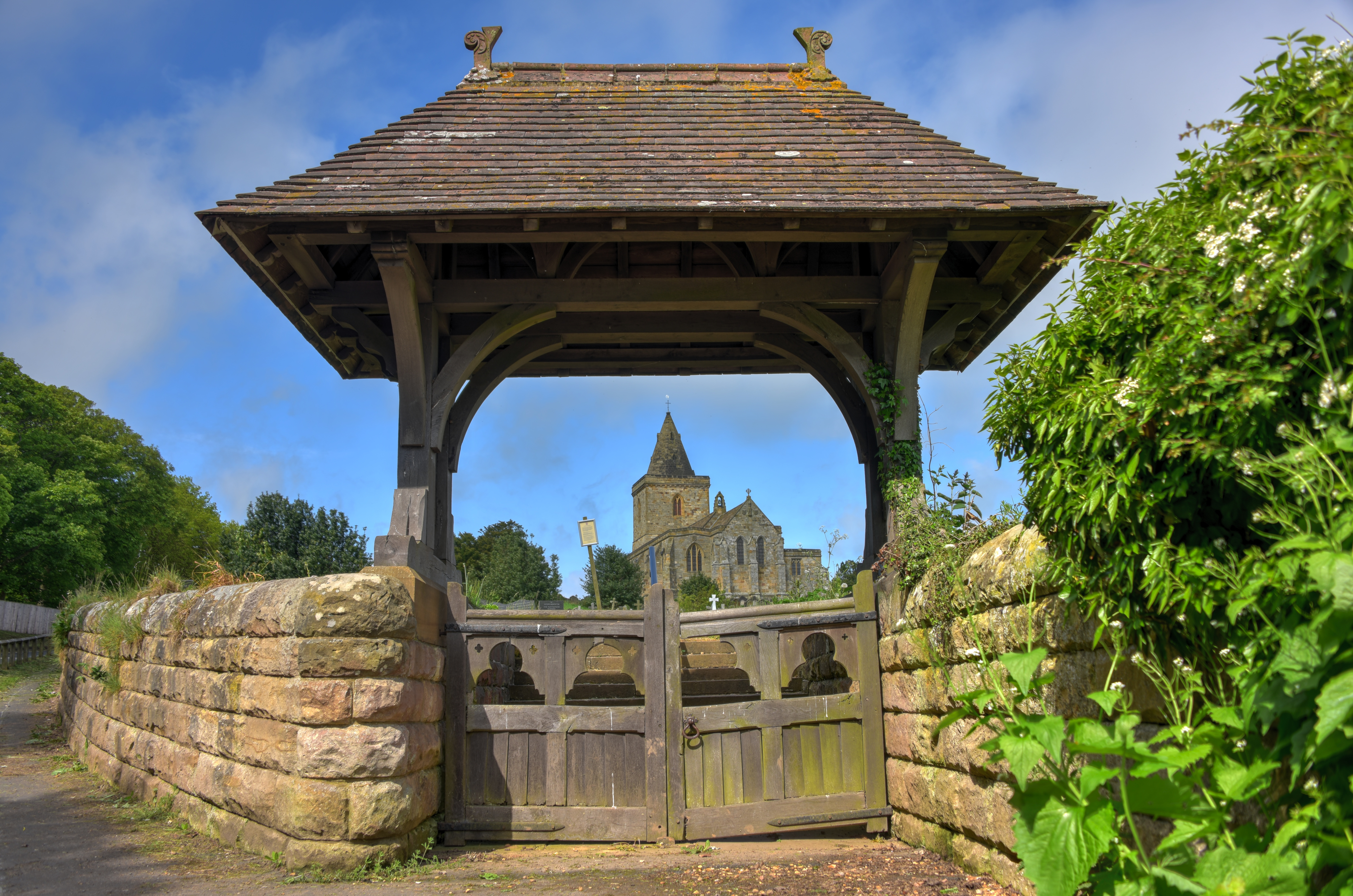
- St. Oswald's church, Lythe, through lych-gate

- Location within North Yorkshire
- 54.5066°N 0.6884°W
- OS grid reference: NZ 85016 13164
- Location: Lythe, North Yorkshire
- Country: England
- Denomination: Church of England
- Website: Website

History
- Status: Active
- Dedication: St Oswald

Administration
- Diocese: York
- Archdeaconry: Cleveland
- Deanery: Whitby
- Benefice: Hinderwell, Roxby & Staithes with Lythe, Ugthorpe & Sandsend
- Parish: Lythe with Sandsend

Clergy
- Vicar: The Reverend Malcolm Jackson

Listed Building – Grade I
- Designated: 6 October 1969
- Reference no.: 1316097

The Church of St Oswald, Lythe, is the parish church for the village of Lythe, 4 miles (6.4 km) west, north west of Whitby in North Yorkshire, England. The church is at the top of Lythe Bank (the western end) and is just east of the village on the A174 road.

A church has been on the site since the 13th century, though the present building was adapted from the old church in 1910 by Sir Walter Tapper. It was grade I listed in 1969.

== History ==
A church had been located on the site since the 13th century, but stones found in the early 20th century mark Lythe as being an important Viking burial ground. The tower of the old church was renovated in 1769, with the whole church being renovated in 1819. When Sir Walter Tapper rebuilt the church in 1910, only the north wall and the east end of the chancel were left untouched. During the rebuilding in the early 20th century, stones found in the walls of the tower were dated to pre-Conquest times. Tapper also adapted the Norman tower to fit a spire, which acts as a way marker and coast marker for sailors travelling alongside the dangerous part of the coast near to here.

The church was granted to the monks of Nostell Priory during the tenure of Pope Alexander III (1159–1181) and so was named after their dedication of St Oswald. The church became crown property in the 1530s after its benefactor, Sir Francis Bigod was hanged at the Tyburn in London for high treason.

Before Tapper's restoration, several changes were made to the building which was essentially of 12th and 13th century origin. At some point, the walls were re-inforced with buttresses and two arches inside the church were demolished to make just one arch. The top of the tower was removed c. 1768 "for fear of it falling down upon the church." In 1818, the roof was stripped of its lead covering and replaced with slate. The churchyard was enlarged in 1887 and around the same period, a lych-gate was added.

The church is only 350 feet (110 m) away from the coast and is adjacent to a steep hill on the A174 road known as Lythe Bank. Its prominent location overlooking road and sea is often described as being in a commanding position for its views to the east. The chapel-of-ease of St Mary's at Sandsend, is believed to have been built when the population of Sandsend increased. The new church meant that worshippers could avoid the steep Lythe Bank to get up to St Oswald's.

Despite being described as having no antiquarian value by some writers (on account of its restoration in 1910) the building was given a grade I listing in 1969.

The roof was replaced again in 2018, when the roof tiles put up by Tapper were replaced with newer stones. The old sandstone tiles were carved into unique artworks by a local sculptor who then sold the pieces during the 2019 Tour de Yorkshire to raise money for the church.

== Churchyard ==
The churchyard contains many graves, some dating as far back as the 10th century. Several of the burial plots are those from the Phipps family; the Phipps are the family that have been in possession of Mulgrave Castle and woods for several centuries. Oswald Phipps, 4th Marquess of Normanby was buried here in 1994.

The churchyard also contains a memorial to the seventeen men from the village killed in the First World War and also commemorates seven unknown sailors who were washed ashore in the same period. The memorial sits to the south west of the church and is grade II listed.

In 1932, the Belgian trawler Jeanne was wrecked on the coast below Lythe. The graveyard contains a grave with three of the dead sailors.

== Parish and benefice region ==
The Church of St Oswald, is the parish church for the Parish of Lythe which covers over 40 square miles (100 km^{2}). The parish consists of the settlements of Lythe, Sandsend, Goldsborough, East & West Barnby and Kettleness and the area largely consists of a rural seaside landscape. The church is part of the benefice of Hinderwell, Roxby & Staithes with Lythe, Ugthorpe & Sandsend.

The benefice has a population of 2,700 but only 74 attend church, and of those, only 20 attend St Oswald's regularly. In 2016, St Oswald's performed three baptisms, nine weddings and seven funerals.

== In popular culture ==
The graveyard and church were used as a setting in the Daniel Day-Lewis film, "Phantom Thread".

== Clergy ==
The following are listed as being rectors of St Oswalds between 1154 and 1537, when Edward Layton was presented as the vicar of St Oswalds by Henry VIII. Thereafter, all clergy are listed as vicars. Some sources list John Fisher, who was incumbent between 1499 and 1504 as being the Catholic Martyr of John Fisher and his recorder being Hugo Ashton, who succeeded him at Lythe.

Vicars at Lythe
Year	Incumbent	Year	Incumbent	Year	Incumbent	Year	Incumbent
1154	Robert, Priest of Lythe (Note: Interregnum between incumbent and next incumbent when dates are incorrect, period appears too long or records are incomplete.)	1372	John de Gascoigne	?	Henry Fletcher	1902	William G. Harland
1233	Hugo, Clericus	1394	Thomas Kellowe	1607	Robert Raynard	1934	Phillip J. Seymour Russell
1267	John de Toucotes	1409	William Gaunton	1640	Thomas Burrowes	1946	J. K. Bretherton Bennett
1291	Stephen de Mauley	1416	Richard Yorke	1662	William Shipton	1949	Dudley Joseph Hill
1296	Simon Clairvaux	1417	John Semer	1667	Herbert Ferreman	1957	Peter Richard Hodgson
1307	William de Melton	1433	Richard Langton	1672	William Smeathman	1961	Dennis Theodore Little
1315	Nicholas de Huggate	1459	Christopher Bank	1679	John Wiely	1973	John William Foster
1318	Thomas de Pauhale	1481	Thomas Artas	1707	Ralph Bateman	1979	Peter Carr Ferguson
1319	Richard de Milton	1499	John Fisher	1737	Thomas Gawton	1983	Robert Anthony Smailes
1322	Adam de Heselbeck	1504	Hugo Ashton	1739	Samuel Marsden	1988	Walter Smith
1328	Francis Gaytom	1511	John Frost	1760	Jonathan Robinson	1999	E. C. Richard Burge
1330	William de Wardhoue	1516	Thomas Larke	1778	William Harrison	2006	Barry Pike
1343	John de Bolton	1523	James Cockerell	1780	Thomas Porter	2018	Malcolm Jackson
1370	Thomas de Myddleton	1537	Edward Layton	1826	William Long		
1372	John de St John	1544	John Pykering	1858	Henry R. S. Pearson		

== See also ==
- Grade I listed buildings in North Yorkshire (district)
- Listed buildings in Lythe
