= Lythe =

Village and civil parish in North Yorkshire, England

Coordinates: 54.505800°N 0.694300°W

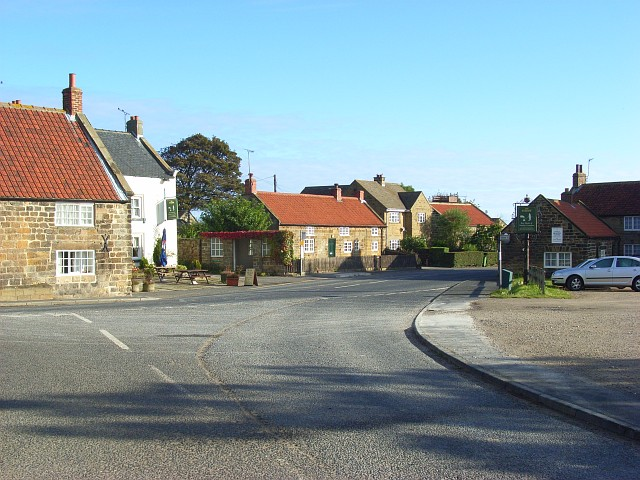
- The village of Lythe

- Location within North Yorkshire
- Population: 377 (2011 census)
- OS grid reference: NZ846130
- Civil parish: Lythe
- Unitary authority: North Yorkshire
- Ceremonial county: North Yorkshire
- Region: Yorkshire and the Humber
- Country: England
- Sovereign state: United Kingdom
- Post town: WHITBY
- Postcode district: YO21
- Police: North Yorkshire
- Fire: North Yorkshire
- Ambulance: Yorkshire
- UK Parliament: Scarborough and Whitby

Lythe is a small village and large civil parish in North Yorkshire, England, situated near Whitby within the North York Moors National Park. The name of the village derives from Old Norse and means hill or slope.

It was in the old North Riding and in the wapentake of Langbaurgh East until 1974. From 1974 to 2023 it was part of the Borough of Scarborough. It is now administered by the unitary North Yorkshire Council.

According to the 2011 UK census, Lythe parish had a population of 377, a reduction on the 2001 UK census figure of 465.

== History ==
St Oswald's Church is a plain stone building in the Early English style. The stained glass east window is a memorial to the Rev. William Long, who was vicar from 1813 to 1858. Inside the church are memorials to the Phipps family, and to the Marquess of Normanby. The register dates from 1634. There is also a Wesleyan Methodist chapel.

Mulgrave Castle is the seat of the Marquess of Normanby. The estate also contains the ruins of a former residence known locally as Mulgrave Old Castle, which was an earthwork motte and bailey fortress.

== Geography ==
Within the parish are the villages of Mickleby, Ugthorpe and Sandsend, and the hamlets of Barnby, Ellerby, Goldsborough, Hutton Mulgrave, Kettleness and Newton Mulgrave.

== Amenities ==
There are a variety of amenities in the village including a primary school, a community shop with post office, tennis courts and a retained fire station. The old Red Lion public house has recently been renamed The Stiddy. A "stiddy" is an anvil packed full of gunpowder and fired like a cannon on special occasions, such as the birth of the Marquess' male heir, the jubilee, or the end of the Second World War.

== Sport and culture ==
Lythe is the home of Mulgrave Cricket Club. The club's home ground is on Lythe Sports Field, located on the High Street, exiting west of the village. The club has two senior XI teams that compete in the Scarborough Beckett Cricket League.

Scenes from the 2017 film Phantom Thread were filmed in the village.

== See also ==
- Listed buildings in Lythe
