= George Pyman =

British shipping magnate (1822-1900)

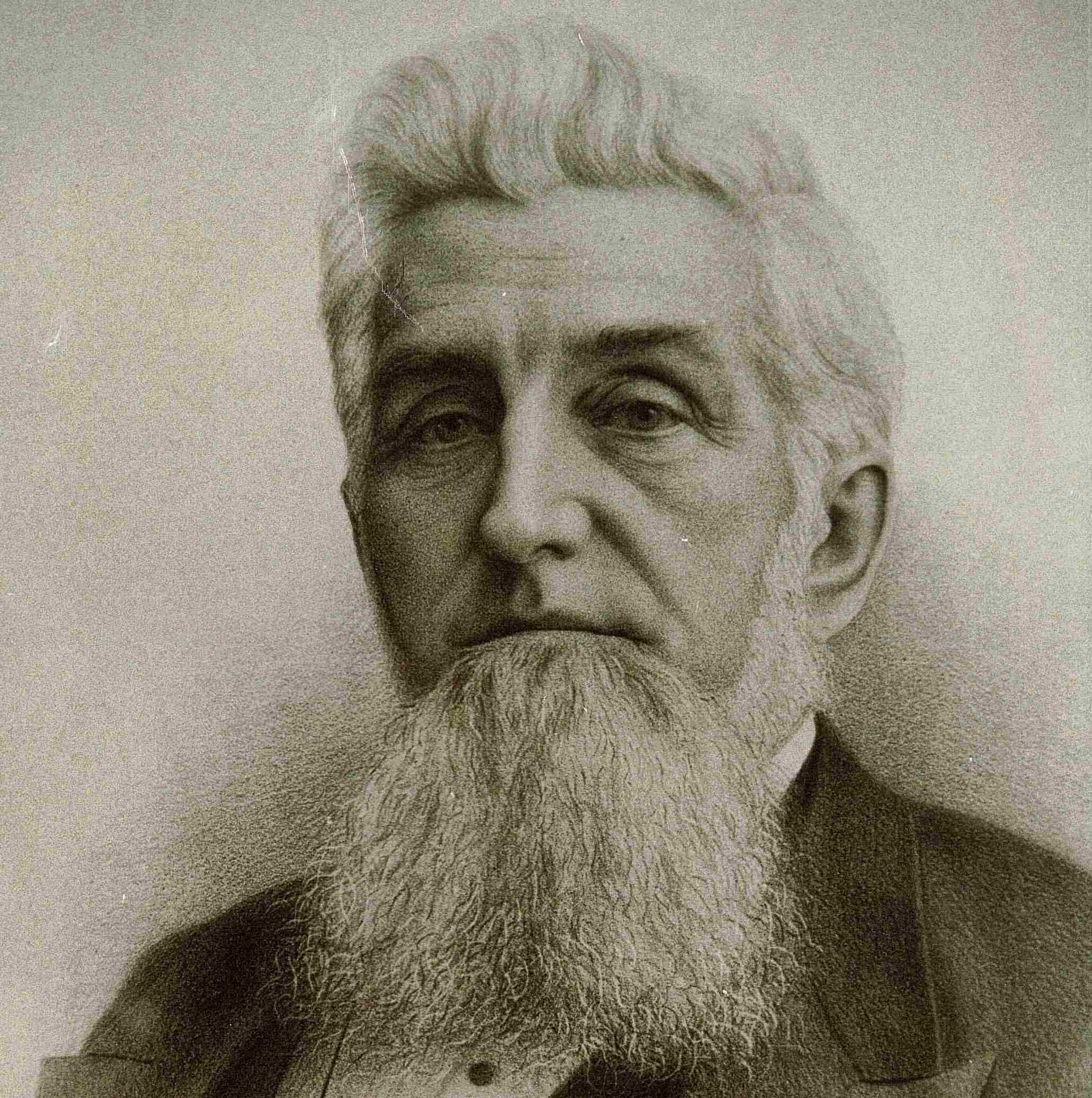
- Born: 1 May 1822; Sandsend, Yorkshire, England
- Died: 22 November 1900 (aged 78); Raithwaite, Yorkshire, England

George Pyman (1 May 1822 – 22 November 1900) was a British shipping magnate born in Sandsend, on the coast of the North Riding of Yorkshire, England.

== Biography ==
George Pyman was the eldest son of James Pyman and Jane Arr. He was only ten when he took the place in the family fishing coble of his uncle John, who had died. At twelve he became an assistant to the store-keeper in Lythe, but returned to the sea as a bound apprentice a few years later, on a brig called the Endymion trading with America and in the Baltics.

George rose through the ranks, and by the age of twenty-one he was already a captain. His next step was to purchase part of a brig, and over the next few years he left the sea for good, settled in West Hartlepool and entered into a partnership with Thomas Scurr in 1854 as shipbrokers for the local collieries. After Scurr's death in 1861 he formed his own company, George Pyman and Co. and started to make his mark on the shipping world.

George's major contribution to shipping was in being one of the first to use the iron screw collier ships, built by Messrs. John Pyle & Co. in 1864, which dramatically cut voyage times. Following on from that, his firms built 38 steamers and were established in coal exporting in Newcastle, Cardiff and London. George became then one of the largest steamship owners on the north-east coast.

Away from his business, George was one of the driving forces behind the growth of West Hartlepool, being elected a Poor Law Guardian in 1861, an Improvement Commissioner in 1868, and sitting on the Durham County Bench from 1872. In 1888 he was elected the second Mayor of West Hartlepool, was granted a coat of arms in the 1880s, and was finally made an Honorary Freeman of the Borough in 1895.
