= Listed buildings in Barnby, North Yorkshire =

Barnby, North Yorkshire is a civil parish in the Scarborough district of North Yorkshire, England. It contains ten listed buildings that are recorded in the National Heritage List for England. All the listed buildings are designated at Grade II, the lowest of the three grades, which is applied to "buildings of national importance and special interest". The parish is almost entirely rural, and all the listed buildings are farmhouses or farm buildings.

== Buildings ==
Name and location	Photograph	Date	Notes
Barnby Tofts Farmhouse; 54.51405°N 0.73295°W	—	Early 18th century	A farmhouse and cottage combined into one, it is in stone and has roofs of pantile and Welsh slate with stone coping and kneelers. There are two storeys and each part has two bays. Most of the windows are small-paned casements, and in the former cottage are fixed lights, and a doorway.
Barnby House Farmhouse, barn and byre 54.51204°N 0.71829°W	—	18th century	The farmhouse and outbuildings are in stone, and have pantile roofs with stone coping and square kneelers. The house has two storeys, a double depth plan and three bays. The doorway is in the centre, the windows are small-paned casements, and all the openings have keystones. To the left is a lower two-storey barn and granary containing stable doors and small fixed lights, and at the rear is a single-storey byre and pigsty.
High Farmhouse, barn and byre, East Barnby; 54.50317°N 0.72349°W	—	18th century	The farmhouse and outbuildings are in stone, and have a pantile roof with stone copings and square kneelers. The farmhouse has two storeys and three bays, and the windows are casements. To the left is a single-storey extension, and to the right is a two-storey extension, a barn with stable doors and keystones, and beyond this is a single-storey byre.
High Farmhouse and stable, West Barnby; 54.50482°N 0.73465°W	—	18th century	The farmhouse is in stone, and has a pantile roof with stone copings and square kneelers. There are two storeys and three bays. In the centre is a doorway and the windows are casements. Recessed on the right is a stable containing stable doors.
Lowlands Farmhouse and outbuilding 54.50136°N 0.73437°W	—	18th century	A stone farmhouse that has a pantile roof with stone coped gables. There are two storeys and an attic and two bays, and the windows are casements. To the south is a single-storey extension, and beyond that are outhouses.
Westfields Farmhouse and outbuildings 54.51419°N 0.74556°W	—	18th century	The house, cottage and outbuildings are in stone, rendered at the front, and have a pantile roof with stone coping and square kneelers. There are two storeys, the house is taller, and the windows in both parts are casements. Barns and byres extend from the rear of both ends of the house and surround the farmyard. The two-storey barn contains stable doors and small openings.
Ferndale Farmhouse; 54.50158°N 0.73692°W	—	Late 18th century (probable)	The farmhouse is in stone, and has a Lakeland slate roof with stone coping and square kneelers. There are two storeys and an attic, two bays, and a single-story extension on the right. The doorway is in the centre, and the windows are sashes.
Barn and byre, Ferndale Farm; 54.50172°N 0.73655°W	—	Late 18th century (probable)	The farm buildings are in stone, and have pantile roofs with stone coped gables and square kneelers. They are in one and two storeys, and contain stable doors and small openings. At the southeast corner is a stone ramp to a loading platform.
Outbuildings, High Farm, West Barnby; 54.50461°N 0.73455°W	—	Late 18th century	A long range of byres and storage buildings in stone that has a pantile roof, partly repaired in concrete tiles, with stone copings and square kneelers. It contains stable doors, and a cart entrance, its arch renewed in brick.
Green Hill Farmhouse, barn and byre 54.50629°N 0.73452°W	—	Late 18th or early 19th century	The farmhouse and cottage, later combined, and attached outbuildings, are in stone, and have pantile roofs with stone coping and shaped kneelers. There are two storeys, the former farmhouse has three bays and the cottage has one. All the windows are small-pane casements. To the right is a single-storey byre, to the left is a two-storey barn with stable doors and a fixed light, and further to the left is a single-storey extension.
