= Listed buildings in Ellerby, North Yorkshire =

Ellerby is a civil parish in the county of North Yorkshire, England. It contains 13 listed buildings that are recorded in the National Heritage List for England. All the listed buildings are designated at Grade II, the lowest of the three grades, which is applied to "buildings of national importance and special interest". The parish contains the village of Ellerby and the surrounding countryside, and, apart from a hotel, all the listed buildings are houses, cottages, farmhouses and farm buildings.

== Buildings ==
Name and location	Photograph	Date	Notes
Ellerby Lodge; 54.52096°N 0.76673°W	—	16th century (probable)	The house, which was later extended, is in stone, and has pantile roofs with stone coped gables. It is in three parts, the left part with two storeys and two bays. The middle part has one storey and an attic, and four narrow bays, the upper windows breaking the eaves, and the right part is taller, with two storeys and two bays. On the front is a porch, and the windows are a mix of sashes and casements, and in the left part are blocked mullioned windows.
Low Farmhouse; 54.52124°N 0.76656°W	—	1628	The farmhouse is in stone, and has a pantile roof with stone copings. There are two storeys and three wide bays. The windows are casements with lintels and keystones. On the right is an external staircase, and in the left gable are four pointed pigeon holes.
Ellerby Hotel; 54.52044°N 0.76696°W		18th century	The hotel, which was later extended, is in stone. The earlier part has a Welsh slate roof with stone copings, two storeys and two bays. The windows are casements, those in the ground floor with lintels and keystones. To the left are five bays with pantile roofs, the left two bays higher. The windows are casements, and there are four gabled dormers with decorative bargeboards.
Ellerby Bank Top Farmhouse, loose house and barn 54.51253°N 0.77217°W		Late 18th century (probable)	The farmhouse is in stone, and has a Welsh slate roof with stone copings and square kneelers. There are two storeys and an attic, and three bays. On the front is a doorway, and the windows are sashes. To the left is a barn wing, to the right is a stable wing, and both have stone-coped pantile roofs.
Ellerby Grange and granary 54.51929°N 0.76782°W	—	Late 18th century	The farmhouse and granary are in stone, and have a pantile roof with stone coping and kneelers. There are two storeys, the farmhouse has three bays, the granary to the left has one bay, and there is a passage door between them. The windows are a mix of sashes, some horizontally-sliding, and others date from the 20th century. To the left is a single-storey extension with an external stone staircase.
Barn and gin-gang, Ellerby Grange; 54.51890°N 0.76746°W	—	Late 18th century	The barn and gin-gang are in stone with a pantile roof. There is one tall storey, the gin-gang has an octagonal plan, and the building contains stable doors. A long flight of steps leads up to a loading platform.
Barn, byre and stable, Middle Farm; 54.52110°N 0.76608°W	—	Late 18th century (probable)	The farm buildings are in stone, and have pantile roofs with stone coped gables, and two storeys. They contain doors, windows and slit vents. To the east is a single-storey stable range with stable doors, and a single-storey byre range fronting the road.
Farm buildings, Low Farm; 54.52150°N 0.76648°W	—	Late 18th or early 19th century	The farm buildings are in stone, and have pantile roofs with stone copings, and a single storey. They consist of stables to the south, a byre to the east, and a barn with a gin-gang to the north converted into byres.
Bank Foot; 54.51986°N 0.76761°W	—	Early 19th century	The cottage is in stone, and has a pantile roof with stone coped gables and one finial. There is one storey and an attic, and two bays. On the front is a porch, and the windows are casements, the upper ones breaking the eaves.
Barn and byres, Ellerby Bank Farm; 54.51275°N 0.77200°W		Early 19th century	The farm buildings are in stone with pantile roofs, and they form a U-shaped plan around the farmyard. The east range has two storeys and there is one storey elsewhere.
Stable-coach house and byre, Ellerby Grange; 54.51911°N 0.76804°W	—	Early 19th century (probable)	The farm buildings are in stone, and have pantile roofs with stone copings. The openings include stable doors, small windows, and a segmental-headed carriage arch with cut voussoirs.
The Cottage; 54.52057°N 0.76650°W	—	Early 19th century	The cottage is in stone, and has a Welsh slate roof with stone copings. There are two storeys and two bays. To the west is a porch, and the windows are casements.
The Granary and Damson House; 54.52092°N 0.76568°W	—	Early 19th century	A farmhouse and outbuilding converted for residential use, in stone, with a Welsh slate roof and stone copings. There are two storeys and three wide bays. Most of the windows are horizontally-sliding sashes, and on the left is an external staircase.
