= Roman Cement Mill =

Listed building in North Yorkshire, England

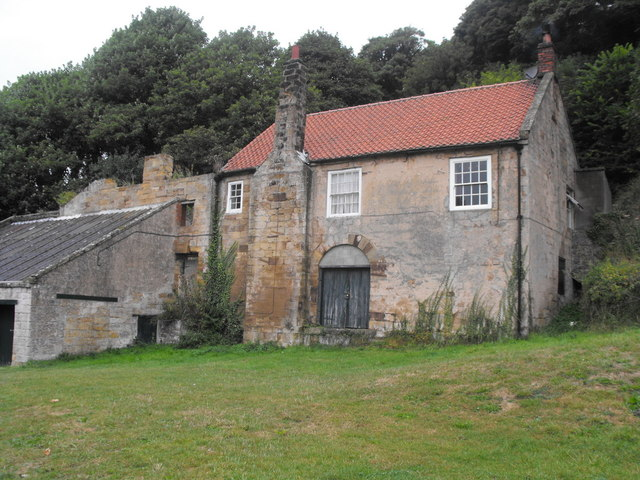
- The mill and cottage in 2013
- Interactive map of the Roman Cement Mill area

General information
- Location: Sandsend, North Yorkshire, England
- Coordinates: 54°30′02″N 0°40′18″W
- Completed: 18th century
- Renovated: 1811 and c. 1936 (converted)

Technical details
- Floor count: 2

Design and construction
- Designations

Listed Building – Grade II
- Official name: Roman Cement Mill and Mill House
- Designated: 10 December 1985
- Reference no.: 1148893

The Roman Cement Mill is a historic building in Sandsend, a hamlet in North Yorkshire, in England.

The watermill was built in the 18th century, as a corn mill. A house for the miller was attached to it, although only its upper floor was used as living accommodation, with the ground floor used for storage. In 1811, Henry Phipps, 1st Earl of Mulgrave, had the mill converted to produce Roman cement, and built a lime kiln immediately to the north. The building was converted into a saw mill in about 1936, and later closed, the house being used as a warehouse. The mill and house were Grade II listed in 1985.

The mill and house are built of stone, and have a pantile roof with stone copings and stepped square kneelers. There are two storeys, the main block has three bays, and to the left is a two-bay mill cross-wing. On the front is a projecting chimney stack, and to its right is a double door under a semicircular relieving arch. On the upper floor are sash windows in architraves, and at the rear are small-pane casement windows. The wing contains a stable door approached by steps, and beyond is a wheelhouse extension. The wheel has been removed, but its shaft and housing remain.

== See also ==
- Listed buildings in Lythe
