= Kettleness =

Hamlet in North Yorkshire, England

Coordinates: 54.5290°N 0.7181°W

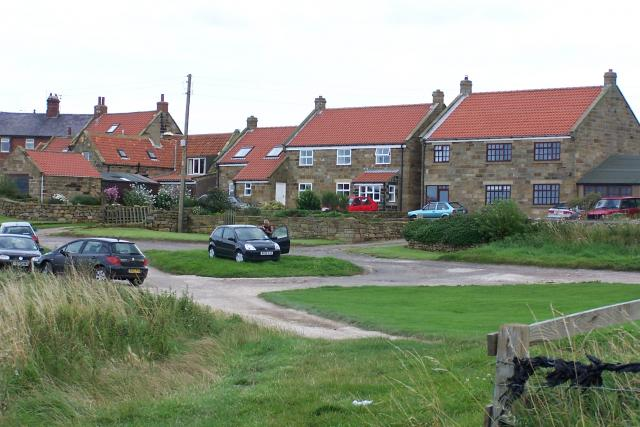
- Kettleness

- Location within North Yorkshire
- OS grid reference: NZ831155
- Civil parish: Lythe
- Unitary authority: North Yorkshire
- Ceremonial county: North Yorkshire
- Region: Yorkshire and the Humber
- Country: England
- Sovereign state: United Kingdom
- Post town: Whitby
- Postcode district: YO21
- Police: North Yorkshire
- Fire: North Yorkshire
- Ambulance: Yorkshire
- UK Parliament: Scarborough and Whitby

Kettleness, is a hamlet in the county of North Yorkshire, England. The settlement only consists of half-a-dozen houses, but up until the early 19th century, it was a much larger village. However, most of that village, which was on the headland, slipped into the sea as a result of instability caused by quarrying for the alum industry. Kettleness became a smaller settlement, with houses rebuilt slightly further inland.

Historically, the hamlet has had an alum works, a jet mining industry and ironstone workings. The hamlet used to have a railway station on the Whitby, Redcar and Middlesbrough Union Railway, that was open between 1883 and 1958. Kettleness is recorded within the parish of Lythe for census purposes.

From 1974 to 2023 it was part of the Borough of Scarborough, it is now administered by the unitary North Yorkshire Council.

== History ==
Kettleness is not mentioned in the Domesday Book of 1086, but the neighbouring settlement of Goldsborough is, and both were in the Wapentake of Langbaurgh. The hamlet takes its name from the nearby headland Kettle Ness, but the hamlet is stylised as Kettleness on mapping. The name is thought to derive from Old Norse, where the Kettle part comes from the word Kettil which describes a pot or cauldron. In this sense, the cauldron refers to the cauldron of water around the headland. The Ness derives from the Viking word for headland.

Kettle Ness is at the eastern end of Runswick Bay, and the cliffs rise to over 375 feet (114 m) above sea level. The present hamlet was built in the 1830s after the collapse of the former village into the sea in 1829. The hamlet is 1.5 miles (2.4 km) north of the A174 road, 7 miles (11 km) north-east of Whitby and 15 miles (24 km) south-east of Guisborough. A chapel-of-ease to the Church of St Oswald, Lythe, was built in 1872 for £300. The building was designed in the Early English style and constructed from Aislaby Stone (a local sandstone) with a Welsh slate roof; most buildings have the distinctive red pantile roofs that the area is renowned for. Whilst the hamlet is in the ecclesiastical parish of Lythe, as well as the civil parish of Lythe, the chapel has since been converted into a recording studio.

The hamlet used to have a railway station opened in 1883, on the Whitby, Redcar and Middlesbrough Union Railway between Loftus and Whitby West Cliff railway station. This served the nearby village of Goldsborough too, and in 1911, the North Eastern Railway estimated the local population to be 54 people. Both the station and railway line were closed in May 1958 due to the high costs of maintenance on the tunnels and bridges. The former station building is now a residential activity centre used by scouting and outward bounds groups.

During the First World War, a field to the east of the hamlet was used by the Royal Naval Air Service as a refuelling point for aircraft transiting up the east coast. As the location was directly on the coast, it was also used as a base for inshore reconnaissance patrols, though there is no evidence of any squadrons being based there. After the war, the site was used as a coastguard station.

== Geology and industry ==
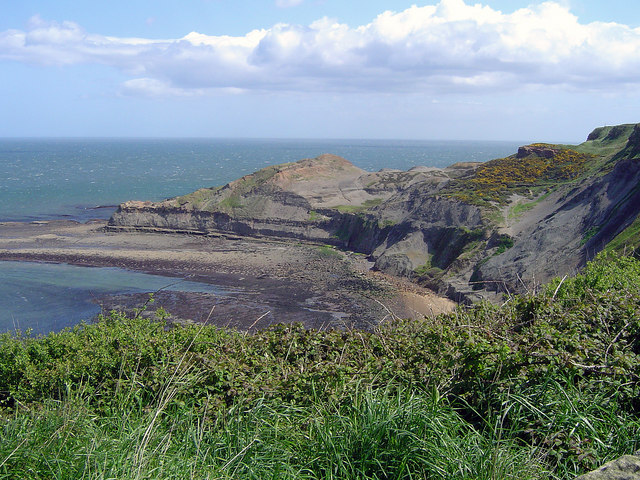
Kettle Ness with a glimpse of the disused quarries.

As at other locations on the Cleveland coast, the underlying geology has an abundance of mineral resources. The Upper Lias consists of alum shales, jet rock, cement shales, and ironstone.

The headland was previously the site of the original village and the alum works, which started quarrying c. 1727. The site of the alum works and the associated buildings are now designated as a scheduled monument, and were among the last on this stretch of the coast to stop working, with closure coming in 1861. At its peak, between 1805 and 1817, the workings were outputting 900 tonnes (990 tons) of alum per year. As it took 50 tonnes (55 tons) of shale to make one tonne (1.1 tons) of alum, the headland was quarried extensively, and the workings caused the original settlement to collapse into the sea on 17 December 1829. The villagers had enough time to evacuate as the landslide was quite slow moving, and they sought refuge on a ship (The Henry), anchored in the bay that had come to load up with alum. The slump revealed a new area of shale which could be used to make alum, so a new set of works was built the following year, and the houses of the workers built further inland.

Besides alum and ironstone mining, the cliffs have supported a small jet industry, which still entices people to look for the stone along the headland. The ironstone at Kettleness was worked in two sites; between 1838 and 1857, stone was won directly from the cliffs and beach being loaded onto ships directly in the bay, though this was described as a "hazardous operation". Ironstone was shipped to the Wylam furnaces of Losh, Wilson and Bell. The other mine was located west of the hamlet and operated between 1910 and 1915, with the ironstone being forwarded to Skinningrove Ironworks by rail. The geology and abundance of fossils have attracted many to this area. One of the most notable finds was the skeleton of a plesiosaur in 1883.

== Legends and culture ==
Kettleness is on a trail established between Whitby and the hamlet with tales of the preternatural, some imagined and some claimed as real, such as a black dog (known as a barghest), which supposedly influenced Bram Stoker to put a black dog in his 1897 novel, Dracula. Also in the book, Mina watches the sunset over the headland of Kettleness from the town of Whitby. In the 1950s, a vicar supposedly met the barghest that haunted the area around Kettleness, and used holy water to banish the spirit.

The trail was launched in 2015 and covers several waypoints along the way into Whitby, following the route of the Cleveland Way.

== See also ==
- Listed buildings in Lythe
