= Nigel Fossard =

11th- and 12th-century Anglo-Norman nobleman

Nigel Fossard (sometimes Niel Fossard; died after 1120) was an Anglo-Norman nobleman who held the honour of Mulgrave in Yorkshire and by virtue of that is considered the feudal baron of Mulgrave.

== Life ==
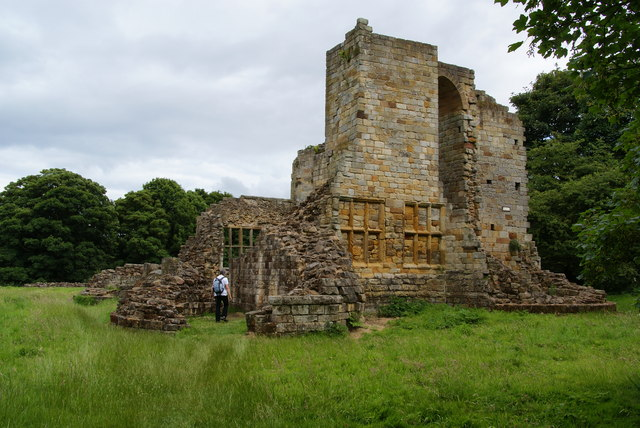
Ruins of Mulgrave Castle, assumed built by Fossard

Fossard came from the western part of Normandy.

Fossard held lands of Robert, Count of Mortain in the Domesday survey of 1086. In all, Fossard held 58 carucates and 6 bovates of land in Yorkshire from Robert, which before the Norman Conquest had been owned by Ligulf. Throughout all three ridings of Yorkshire, Fossard's holdings amounted to over 500 carucates. His landholdings were only in Yorkshire, however. Fossard and another tenant of Robert of Mortain, Richard de Sourdeval, held the majority of the count's lands in Yorkshire. Although the count was a large landholder in Yorkshire, his two tenants effectively controlled all his lands and this weakened the comital power in the county.

When Robert of Mortain rebelled and lost in 1088, Fossard became a tenant-in-chief of the King. His holding of the honour of Mulgrave in Yorkshire means he is considered a feudal baron of Mulgrave. Under King Henry I of England, Fossard worked to concentrate his holdings around Lythe Castle, an act that was encouraged by the king in order to secure royal authority in Yorkshire. Because his lands were all in Yorkshire, it is likely that Fossard spent most of his time in that county.

Fossard gave gifts to St Mary's Abbey in York, including lands and churches. He also gave a church to Ramsey Abbey. In the charter for this gift, he mentions himself, his wife, who is unnamed, and his son and heir – also unnamed. It also mentions King William the Conqueror, the queen Matilda of Flanders, and the king and queen's eldest son, Robert Curthose. For all the people listed, Fossard sought "fraternity" with the monastery. This relationship was, according to the historian Janet Burton, "a spiritual union with the community" of the monastic house, effectively making them like a member of the community.

The name of Fossard's wife is not known. Fossard's heir was his son Robert Fossard. He also had a daughter, Gertrude, who married first Robert de Meinil and then Jordan Paynel. The Walter Fossard who attested Nigel's charter giving lands to St Mary's may have also been Nigel's son. Fossard died likely after 1120, and perhaps as late as 1128. He witnessed a charter of Thurstan, the Archbishop of York that is dated to between 1114 and 1128. In 1129, his lands were controlled by the king, and his heir had to pay a fine to recover his inheritance. Why the lands were in the king's control is not recorded.
