= Listed buildings in Lythe =

Lythe is a civil parish in the county of North Yorkshire, England. It contains 68 listed buildings that are recorded in the National Heritage List for England. Of these, two are listed at Grade I, the highest of the three grades, two are at Grade II*, the middle grade, and the others are at Grade II, the lowest grade. The parish contains the villages of Lythe, Goldsborough, Kettleness and Sandsend, and the surrounding countryside. The parish contains the ruins of Mulgrave Castle, and a country house with the same name; together with the stable block of the house; they are all listed. The other building of considerable importance is a church. Most of the rest of the listed buildings are houses, cottages and associated structures, farmhouses and farm buildings, and the others include a lime kiln, a mill, a public house, a village hall, and a war memorial.

== Key ==
Grade	Criteria
I	Buildings of exceptional interest, sometimes considered to be internationally important
II*	Particularly important buildings of more than special interest
II	Buildings of national importance and special interest

== Buildings ==
Name and location	Photograph	Date	Notes	Grade
Old Mulgrave Castle; 54.49350°N 0.70557°W		12th century	The remains of the castle, now in ruins, include the keep, the bailey walls and the gatehouse. The keep has four round towers, and inserted mullioned and transomed windows, and the gatehouse has twin half-round towers.	I
St Oswald's Church; 54.50668°N 0.68860°W		13th century	The church, which contains Saxon material, has been altered and extended through the centuries, and was largely rebuilt in 1920 by Walter Tapper. It is built in stone with a tile roof, and consists of a nave, north and south aisles, a south porch, a chancel with aisles, and a large square west tower with a small west baptistry. The tower has two stages, paired lancet bell openings with quatrefoil spandrels, a corbel table, a parapet, and a short spire with small lucarnes.	I
House to east of the public house 54.50076°N 0.66962°W		17th century or earlier	The house is in stone with a thatched roof. There are two storeys, two bays, and a lean-to on the right. In the centre is a doorway with a small bracketed hood, flanked by horizontally-sliding sash windows. The upper floor contains tripartite windows with sashes.	II
Lythe Hall; 54.50492°N 0.69344°W	—	1660	The house is in stone, and has a pantile roof with stone copings. The front is irregular; on the left is a section with one storey and a roof and two bays, with the upper windows breaking the eaves, then a two-storey porch with an attic containing a doorway, the next section has one storey and two bays containing long windows, and then a section with one storey and an attic and three bays. All the windows are sashes.	II
Kerr's Farmhouse and stable 54.50629°N 0.69661°W	—	Late 17th century	The farmhouse is in stone, and has a pantile roof with stone copings and square kneelers. There are two storeys, a cottage with one bays, a farmhouse with two bays, and a lower two-storey south wing. The windows are casements with keystones. Further to the south is a single storey stable containing stable doors.	II
Oakdene; 54.50592°N 0.69406°W		Late 17th century	The house is in stone, and has a pantile roof with stone copings. There are two storeys and three bays. The house contains a doorway, a small shop window, and horizontally-sliding sash windows. In the side wall are two blocked mullioned windows.	II
Langholm; 54.50083°N 0.66935°W	—	c. 1700	The cottage is in stone, with a moulded floor band, swept eaves, and a Welsh slate roof with roof lights. There are two storeys and two bays. The central doorway has an architrave, and the windows are casements.	II
Spray Cottage; 54.50312°N 0.67142°W	—	Late 17th or early 18th century	The cottage is in stone, with quoins on the left, and a Welsh slate roof. There are two storeys and two bays. In the ground floor is a porch on the right, the windows are sashes, and in the roof are two gabled dormers with bargeboards.	II
Lumley Cottage; 54.50236°N 0.67552°W	—	Early 18th century} (probable)	The house is in stone, and has a pantile roof with stone copings and square kneelers. There are two storeys and two bays. The doorway has an architrave and a moulded head. The windows are small-paned casements, those in the upper floor have been heightened, breaking the eaves, with dormers.	II
St Mary's Cottage; 54.50225°N 0.67581°W	—	Early 18th century	The house is in stone, and has a pantile roof with stone copings and square kneelers. There is one storey and an attic, two bays, and a small recessed bay on the right. On the front is a doorway, and the windows are horizontally-sliding sashes, those in the attic breaking the eaves.	II
Mulgrave Castle and screen walls 54.50136°N 0.69237°W	—	Before 1735	A country house that has been extended, it is in stone, with embattled parapets, and has a Lakeland slate roof. There are three storeys, an irregular front of 13 bays, and five bays on the left return. On the front, the middle and outer bays project, the middle bay containing a Tudor-style entrance. The windows are sashes. At the rear is a projecting hexagonal tower with a stair turret. Extending from the north angles of the house are curved screen walls.	II*
Laurel Cottage and Beech Cottage; 54.50048°N 0.67030°W	—	Early to mid 18th century	A pair of cottages in stone, the right cottage rendered and with a Welsh slate roof, and the left cottage with a pantile roof. Each cottage has two storeys, two bays, a doorway in the left bay, sash windows, and a gabled dormer in the roof.	II
Barnby Sleights Farmhouse and stable 54.49285°N 0.72554°W	—	18th century	A farmhouse and cottage in stone on a plinth, with pantile roofs, stone copings and square kneelers. There are two storeys, the main block has two-bays, to the left is a two-bay extension, and on the right is a small loose box. The doorway is in the extension, and in the main block are small-paned casement windows with cut voussoirs and triple keystones on the ground floor.	II
Cobbler Cottage and outbuilding 54.50565°N 0.69590°W		18th century	The cottage is in stone, and has a pantile roof with stone copings and small kneelers. There is one storey and an attic, one bay, a single-storey west extension, a north porch, and an outbuilding further to the west. On the front, the windows are sashes, and at the rear are modern windows.	II
High Farmhouse and barn 54.51982°N 0.71053°W		18th century	A farmhouse and cottage, later combined into one, it is in stone, and has a pantile roof with stone copings and square kneelers. There are two storeys and four bays. On the front is a doorway, the windows are small-paned casements, and all the ground floor openings have keystones,. The barn to the left contains garage doors and small pivoted windows above.	II
High Leas Farmhouse and stable 54.49726°N 0.72024°W	—	18th century	The farmhouse is in stone, and has a pantile roof with stone copings and square kneelers. There are two storeys and three bays. In the centre is a doorway, and the windows are casements under slightly-sloped arches with cut voussoirs and keystones. At the rear is a central stair window, and to the right is an outbuilding and a raised causeway.	II
Holly Cottage; 54.50614°N 0.69357°W		18th century	The house is in stone, and has a pantile roof with stone coping. There are two storeys and an irregular front. In the centre is a doorway, and the windows are a mix of horizontally-sliding sashes and small-paned casements.	II
Kettleness Farmhouse; 54.52908°N 0.71911°W		18th century	The farmhouse is in stone, and has a pantile roof with stone copings and square kneelers. There are two storeys and two bays, a single-storey wing on the left, and other extensions. The doorway is in the left bay, and the windows are casements.	II
Lime kiln 54.50080°N 0.67190°W	—	18th century (probable)	The lime kiln is in stone, built into a bank, and is half-octagonal with a parapet. There are three fire holes in a triangular shape, the middle and left ones retaining their iron furnace doors. On the sides are walls with buttresses, a small hut and a flight of steps. The right abutment curves round the hill and incorporates steps.	II
Low Farmhouse, Goldsborough; 54.52084°N 0.70992°W	—	18th century	The farmhouse is in stone, and has a pantile roof with stone copings and square kneelers. There are two storeys and three bays. On the front is a doorway, and the windows are casements, those on the ground floor with keystones.	II
Barn, byre and stable, Low Farm; 54.52106°N 0.70979°W	—	18th century	The farm buildings are in stone, and have pantile roofs with stone copings and kneelers. They form a U-shaped plan, with a two-storey barn to the north and a long single-storey byre running east. There is a segmental cart arch in the northeast corner, and elsewhere are plain openings.	II
Middle Farmhouose, Goldsborough; 54.51975°N 0.70950°W	—	18th century	A farmhouse and cottage, later combined, in stone with a pantile roof, stone copings and square kneelers. There are two storeys and three bays, the left bay lower. On the front is a porch, the windows are a mix of sashes and casements, the ground floor openings with keystones.	II
Barns north of Middle Farmhouse; 54.51994°N 0.70945°W	—	18th century	The barns are in stone, and have pantile roofs with stone copings and square kneelers. They have two storeys, and there is a single-storey extension to the north. The openings include doors and tilting sash windows. The single-storey east barn has a loading platform and horizontally-sliding sash windows.	II
Mulgrave Lodge; 54.50189°N 0.67733°W	—	18th century	A small cottage in stone, with a pantile roof, stone copings and square kneelers. There is one storey and a lower extension to the right. The cottage contains a doorway and a fixed light, and the other windows are sashes.	II
Overdale Farmhouse; 54.51580°N 0.69307°W		18th century	The house is in stone, and has a pantile roof with stone copings and kneelers. There are two storeys and four bays. The windows are sashes in architraves, with vertical bars.	II
Raw Pastures Farmhouse; 54.52070°N 0.70994°W		18th century	The farmhouse is in stone, and has a pantile roof with stone copings and kneelers. There are two storeys and three bays, and a single-storey extension on the left. In the centre is a doorway, above which is a casement window. The other windows on the front are tripartite, and all the windows have keystones. The extension contains small-pane casement windows.	II
Rigg Cottage and The Cottage; 54.50248°N 0.67414°W	—	18th century	A pair of cottages in stone, one with a pantile roof, and the other with a tile roof, and both with stone copings and square kneelers. There are two storeys and three bays. On the front are two doorways, and the windows are a mix; some are casements, and the others are tripartite.	II
Rockery Cottage, Crab Cottage, Broom House, Winston House and Valley View; 54.50316°N 0.67372°W	—	18th century	A row of cottages, most in stone with pantile roofs. They have one storey and attics, the upper windows breaking the eaves under gables with coping on footstones. There is a total of twelve bays, some doorways have oblong fanlights, and the windows are horizontally-sliding sashes. Valley View is mainly in brick, and faces west. It has two storeys and attics, and three bays.	II
Roman Cement Mill and Mill House; 54.50067°N 0.67160°W		18th century	The mill and house are in stone, and have a pantile roof with stone copings and stepped square kneelers. There are two storeys, the main block has three bays, and to the left is a two-bay mill cross-wing. On the front is a projecting chimney stack, and to its right is a double door under a semicircular relieving arch. In the upper floor are sash windows in architraves, and at the rear are small-pane casement windows. The wing contains a stable door approached by steps, and beyond is a wheelhouse extension.	II
The Cottage, Goldsborough; 54.51989°N 0.70996°W	—	18th century	A house and a cottage, later combined, in stone with a pantile roof, stone copings and square kneelers. There are two storeys and four bays. The windows are a mix of small-pane casements and sashes, and at the rear is a porch.	II
The Fox and Hounds Public House; 54.51987°N 0.70913°W		18th century	The public house is in stone and has a pantile roof with stone copings. There are two storeys and three bays, a single-storey south extension, and a rear extension under a catslide roof. The windows are casements.	II
The Old Vicarage; 54.50544°N 0.69304°W	—	18th century	The house is in stone and has a pantile roof with stone copings and large shaped kneelers. There are two storeys, a central section with three bays, flanking single-bay wings, and a small rear extension. In the centre is a gabled porch, and the windows are recessed sashes.	II
Upton Hall and outbuildings 54.51003°N 0.70442°W	—	18th century	A farmhouse and cottage combined into a house, it is in stone, with a pantile roof, stone copings and square kneelers. There are two storeys and three bays. On the front is a doorway, and the windows are small-pane casements. To the left is a two-storey barn, and a single-storey shed.	II
Woodbine Cottage and Rose Cottage; 54.52094°N 0.70920°W		18th century	A pair of houses in stone, with a pantile roof, stone copings and square kneelers. There are two storeys, four bays, and a right extension. In the ground floor are three-light windows, and the upper floor contains horizontally-sliding sashes.	II
Jasmine House and Cottage; 54.50325°N 0.67230°W	—	Late 18th century (probable)	A house divided into two, in stone, with a Welsh slate roof, stone copings and kneelers. There are two storeys, an attic and a basement, five bays, and a single-storey rear extension. The central doorway has chamfered jambs and lintel. The windows are sashes, the window in the basement is horizontally-sliding, and there are three gabled dormers.	II
Middle Farmhouse, Lythe; 54.50551°N 0.69559°W		Late 18th century	The farmhouse is in stone, and has a pantile roof with stone copings. There are two storeys and three bays. The central doorway has an oblong fanlight, and the windows are sashes with a central pivoted opening section.	II
Barns, gin-gang and byres, Overdale Farm; 54.51606°N 0.69329°W	—	Late 18th century	The farm buildings are in stone with pantile roofs. At the east end is a single-storey pigsty, north of which is a single-storey stable/cartshed containing a segmental-headed cart entrance. Facing the farmhouse is a two-storey barn with a pentagonal gin-gang to the north, and to the west is a range in one and two storeys. The buildings contain stable doors, and in the upper floor are pivoted sash windows.	II
Thordisa Cottage; 54.50052°N 0.67045°W	—	Late 18th century	The house is rendered and has a pantile roof with stone copings and square kneelers. There are two storeys and an attic, and two bays. In the centre is a doorway, and the windows are sashes, those in the ground floor in architraves and in the upper floor they are horizontally-sliding.	II
Sea View Cottage; 54.50299°N 0.67119°W		Late 18th century	The cottage is in stone, and has a pantile roof with stone copings and kneelers. There are two storeys, two bays, and a single-storey single-bay extension on the left. In the centre is a gabled porch, and the windows are small-pane casements.	II
Stable north of Mulgrave Castle; 54.50190°N 0.69275°W	—	1787	The stable block was designed by John Soane, it is in stone, and has hipped Lakeland slate roofs. The main range has two storeys and eleven bays, the middle bay containing a clock tower with an entrance arch. There are flanking projecting single-storey, three-bay wings.	II*
Barn, byres, stables and cartshed, Barnby Sleights Farm; 54.49308°N 0.72545°W	—	18th or early 19th century	The farm buildings are in stone with a stone coped pantile roof. To the east is a two-storey barn, and the other buildings have one storey. There are segmental-arched cart openings, stable doors and other openings.	II
Brynymor Cottage; 54.50305°N 0.67512°W	—	Late 18th to early 19th century	The cottage is in stone with a pantile roof. There is one storey and an attic, and two bays. In the centre is a doorway with a plain surround, and flanking it are small-pane windows. Above are dormers with coped gables and sash windows.	II
Cliff House; 54.52939°N 0.71417°W		18th or early 19th century	The house is in stone, and has a pantile roof with coped gables. There are two storeys, a double depth plan and three bays. The doorway is in the centre, the windows on the front are casements, and at the rear they are sashes.	II
Daneholm; 54.50079°N 0.66943°W	—	Late 18th to early 19th century	The house is in stone, and has a roof of asbestos slate with copings and square kneelers. There are two storeys and two bays. On the left is a doorway with an architrave and an oblong fanlight, and to its right is a modern plate glass window. The windows in the upper floor are casements with ornamental transoms.	II
Barn and byres, High Leas Farm; 54.49697°N 0.72089°W	—	Late 18th to early 19th century	The farm buildings are in stone, and have pantile roofs with stone copings. They consist of a two-storey barn on the west side of the yard and single-storey byres on the south side. In the barn is a segmental cart arch, and elsewhere there are stable doors and other openings.	II
Ivy Cottage, Sandsend; 54.50238°N 0.67533°W	—	Late 18th or early 19th century	Two cottages combined into one, in stone with a pantile roof, stone copings and square kneelers. There are two storeys and two bays. On the front is a doorway, and the windows are small casements with heavy lintels.	II
Ivy Cottage, The Holmstead, Seawood View and Topcliffe; 54.50598°N 0.69518°W		Late 18th or early 19th century	A row of four cottages in stone, with a pantile roof and stone copings. There are two storeys, each cottage has two bays, and in the centre is a passage with a shouldered arch. Each cottage has a doorway with a small bracketed stone hood, the windows in Ivy Cottage, on the left, are horizontally-sliding sashes with keystones, and in the other cottages are tripartite windows.	II
Myrtle Cottage, Ivy Cottage, Fern Cottage, Rose Cottage and Elm Cottage; 54.50463°N 0.69326°W	—	Late 18th or early 19th century	A row of five cottages in stone, with a pantile roof, stone copings and curved kneelers. There is one storey and attics, and seven bays. Most of the windows are small-paned casements, and there are five dormers.	II
Primrose Cottage; 54.50228°N 0.67465°W	—	Late 18th or early 19th century	The house is in stone, and has a pantile roof with stone copings and kneelers. There are two storeys and five bays, and flanking single-storey two-bay wings. The windows in the main part are horizontally-sliding sashes. The right section is rendered and whitewashed, with a tile roof, and small-pane casement windows.	II
Cottage east of Primrose Cottage; 54.50232°N 0.67454°W	—	Late 18th to early 19th century	Originally two cottages, later combined into one, it is in stone and has a pantile roof with a brick ridge, stone copings and square kneelers. There is one storey and an attic, and three bays. On the front is a porch flanked by tripartite windows with small opening lights. Above are two windows in coped gables, and one small window.	II
Barn, byre and stable, Raw Pastures Farm; 54.52078°N 0.71031°W	—	18th to early 19th century	The farm buildings are in stone, and have pantile roofs with stone copings and kneelers. They form a U-shaped plan, the barn has two storeys, the other buildings have one storey, and the openings are plain.	II
Romany Cottage; 54.50328°N 0.67205°W	—	Late 18th or early 19th century	A cottage at the end of a row, in stone with a pantile roof, stone copings and square kneelers. There are two storeys, one bay on the front and two on the gable end. On the front is a doorway and sash windows, and on the ground floor of the gable end are fixed lights.	II
Rose Cottage, Lythe; 54.50600°N 0.69569°W		Late 18th or early 19th century	The cottage is in stone, and has a pantile roof with stone copings and rounded kneelers. There is one storey and an attic, and two bays. In the centre is a doorway with a bracketed stone hood, flanked by triple sash windows. Above, are two small-pane casement windows in coped gables resting on the eaves.	II
Rose Cottage and Holly Cottage, Sandsend; 54.50299°N 0.67485°W	—	Late 18th or early 19th century	A pair of cottages in stone, with a pantile roof, stone copings and square kneelers. There are two storeys and five bays. On the front are doorways and a mix of three-light windows and small-pane casement windows. The ground floor windows have lintels with keystones.	II
Rosedean and cottage to the east 54.50323°N 0.67484°W	—	Late 18th to early 19th century	A pair of cottages in stone, with a pantile roof, stone copings and square kneelers. There are two storeys and four bays. In the ground floor are two doorways, and the windows are sashes in architraves. The ground floor openings have lintel with keystones.	II
Wayside and Bank Cottage; 54.50589°N 0.69734°W	—	Late 18th or early 19th century	Three cottages, later two, in stone, with a pantile roof, stone copings and square kneelers. There are two storeys and three bays. On the front are two doorways, and the windows are casements.	II
Abingdon House and shop to the west 54.50571°N 0.69490°W	—	Early 19th century	The house and the shop to the right are in stone, and have a Welsh slate roof with stone copings and shaped kneelers. There are two storeys and three bays. In the right bay is a shopfront with bow windows flanking a double doorway with a rectangular fanlight, and over all is a continuous entablature. To the left is a doorway with a plain surround, and the windows are small-paned casements.	II
Chapel Cottage; 54.50615°N 0.69697°W	—	Early 19th century	A house and a cottage, later combined into a house, in stone with a pantile roof and stone copings. There are two storeys, four bays and a single-storey extension to the right. In the front is a doorway, and the windows are casements.	II
High Farmhouse, Lythe; 54.50602°N 0.69625°W		Early 19th century	The farmhouse is in stone, and has a pantile roof with stone copings and shaped kneelers. There are two storeys and two bays. In the centre is a doorway, and the windows are small-paned casements. To the right is a recessed two-storey extension with a porch in the angle.	II
Low Farmhouse, Lythe; 54.50598°N 0.69476°W		Early 19th century	The farmhouse is in stone, and has a Welsh slate roof with stone copings. There are two storeys and three bays. The central doorway has an oblong fanlight, and the windows are sashes.	II
Pear Tree Cottage, cottage to west, and Glenrigg Cottage; 54.50341°N 0.67462°W	—	Early 19th century (probable)	A row of three cottages in stone, with a pantile roof, stone copings and shaped kneelers. There are two storeys and four bays. The doorways have chamfered jambs and lintels. The windows are a mix of horizontally-sliding sashes, tripartite windows, and casements.	II
Phipps' Farmhouse; 54.50610°N 0.69722°W	—	Early 19th century	A farmhouse and cottage, later combined, in stone, with a pantile roof, a brick ridge, stone copings and curved kneelers. There are two storeys and four bays, and a single-storey, single-bay right extension. On the front is a doorway, and the windows are casements.	II
Victoria House; 54.50563°N 0.69314°W	—	Early 19th century	The house is in stone, and has a pantile roof with stone copings and shaped kneelers. There are two storeys and three bays, a lower two-storey two-bay extension to the north, and a lower two-storey rear extension. The doorway is in the gable end, and the windows are small-pane casements.	II
Village Hall; 54.50311°N 0.67504°W	—	Early 19th century (probable)	The village hall is in stone with a pantile roof. There is one storey and four bays. The doorway has a bracketed flat hood, and the windows are sashes in architraves.	II
Cleveland House; 54.52020°N 0.71047°W	—	Early to mid 19th century	The house is in stone on a plinth, and has a tile roof with stone copings and shaped kneelers. There are two storeys and two bays, and a right extension with one storey and an attic. The central doorway has an oblong fanlight, and the windows are sashes, those in the upper floor under stone coped gables. In the extension is a large modern dormer.	II
Estbek House; 54.50053°N 0.66995°W	—	Early to mid 19th century	The house is in stone, with a moulded eaves cornice, and a pantile roof with stone copings and shaped kneelers. There are two storeys, an attic and a basement, and two wide bays. Eight steps lead up to the central doorway that has a Classical-style doorcase and a pediment, and a door with an oblong fanlight. The windows are sashes, those in the attic horizontally-sliding, and in the basement is a small fixed light.	II
Mulgrave Cottage; 54.50157°N 0.67923°W	—	Late 19th century	An estate house in stone, with a Welsh slate roof, stone copings and square kneelers. It consists of two parallel ranges with two storeys and three bays, and a cross-wing with two storeys and an attic, and three bays. The doorway has a hood mould, and most of the windows are mullioned. At the west end is a wooden loggia and balcony, and a conservatory.	II
Lythe War Memorial; 54.50660°N 0.68882°W		c. 1920	The war memorial is in the churchyard of St Oswald's Church, to the south of the tower. It is in limestone, and consists of an octagonal shaft 3 metres (9.8 ft) high, on a cuboid plinth, on a low two-stepped base. The shaft is surmounted by a stylised four-sided lantern head depicting the Crucifixion. On the plinth are inscriptions, including the names of those lost in the First World War.	II
