= Albinia (ship) =

- Albinia, of 250 tons (bm), was built one the River Thames in 1744. In 1752 she made one voyage as a slave ship in the trade of enslaved people. Captain John Gilbert, with a crew of 36 men, sailed from London on 1 November 1752. He started embarking captives on the Gold Coast on 27 January 1753. Albinia left Africa on 3 May and arrived at Kingston with 178 captives and 36 crew members on 11 July. She sailed from Jamaica on 20 August. She appears in the UK national archives with a document, probably a letter of marque, dated 2 March 1757. She was armed with 12 carriage guns and had a crew of 26 men. Her commander was John Gilbert, and her owners were the merchants Solomon Ashley, William Beckford, Thomas Collett, and company, of London. Albinia, Gilbert, master, was lost off the coast of Florida in 1763. Captain and crew made shore, where a sloop under the command of Captain Folger, rescued them. The vessel and her cargo of indigo were lost. She had been on a voyage from Jamaica to London. Captain Folger arrived in New York on 20 April from Havana.
- Albinia (1813 ship) was launched at Newcastle-upon-Tyne in 1813. She initially sailed several times to India under a license from the British East India Company (EIC). One of her voyages brought her master into conflict with the Post Office. She then sailed primarily between London and Demerara. She foundered on 25 March 1842 off the coast of Ireland.
- Albinia, of 126 tons (bm (old measurement)), or 169 (bm (new measurement)), was a schooner (later brigantine), built in New Brunswick in 1840, and registered in 1841. She moved her registry to Greenock. On 16 September 1851, she was driven ashore and wrecked at Port Elizabeth. She was on a voyage from Port Natal to East London. Her entry in the 1851 issue of Lloyd's Register (LR), carried the annotation "Wrecked".
