= Barnby, North Yorkshire =

Civil parish in North Yorkshire, England

Coordinates: 54°30′N 0°44′W

Barnby
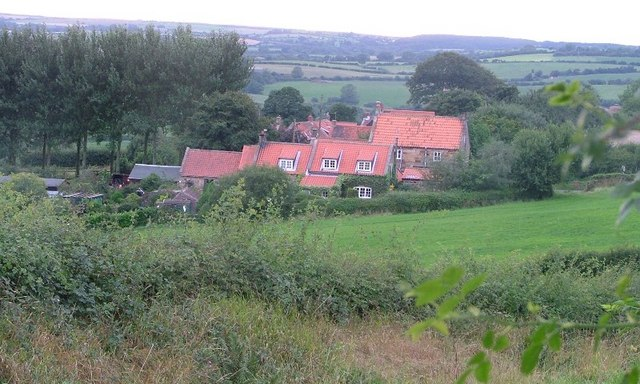
- West Barnby

- Population: 79 (2001 census)
- OS grid reference: NZ820123
- Civil parish: Barnby
- Unitary authority: North Yorkshire
- Ceremonial county: North Yorkshire
- Region: Yorkshire and the Humber
- Country: England
- Sovereign state: United Kingdom
- Post town: WHITBY
- Postcode district: YO21
- Police: North Yorkshire
- Fire: North Yorkshire
- Ambulance: Yorkshire
- UK Parliament: Scarborough and Whitby

Barnby is a civil parish in North Yorkshire, England. According to the 2001 UK census, the parish had a population of 79. As the civil parish population remained less than 100 at the 2011 census, all details were included in the civil parish of Mickleby.

The parish includes the hamlets of East Barnby and West Barnby. From 1974 to 2023 it was part of the Borough of Scarborough, it is now administered by the unitary North Yorkshire Council.

The name Barnby derives from the Old Norse barnbȳ meaning 'children's village'.

== See also ==
- Listed buildings in Barnby, North Yorkshire
