= Mickleby =

Village and civil parish in North Yorkshire, England

Coordinates: 54.505800°N 0.762400°W

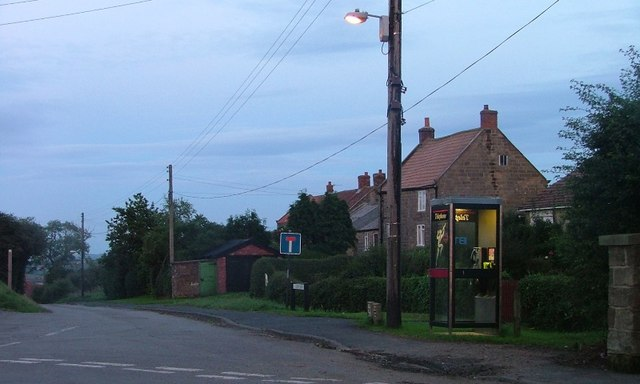
- A street in the village

- Location within North Yorkshire
- Population: 283 (Including Barnby and Ellerby. 2011 census)
- OS grid reference: NZ802129
- Civil parish: Mickleby
- Unitary authority: North Yorkshire
- Ceremonial county: North Yorkshire
- Region: Yorkshire and the Humber
- Country: England
- Sovereign state: United Kingdom
- Post town: SALTBURN-BY-THE-SEA
- Postcode district: TS13
- Dialling code: 01947
- Police: North Yorkshire
- Fire: North Yorkshire
- Ambulance: Yorkshire
- UK Parliament: Scarborough and Whitby

Mickleby is a village and civil parish in the county of North Yorkshire, England.

According to the 2011 UK census, Mickleby parish had a population of 283, an increase on the 2001 UK census figure of 165. However, the 2011 census statistics are for an output area which includes Barnby and Ellerby, and for which the 2001 census figure was 274.

From 1974 to 2023 it was part of the Borough of Scarborough, it is now administered by the unitary North Yorkshire Council.
