= Ellerby, North Yorkshire =

Village and civil parish in North Yorkshire, England

Coordinates: 54.521100°N 0.766500°W

Ellerby
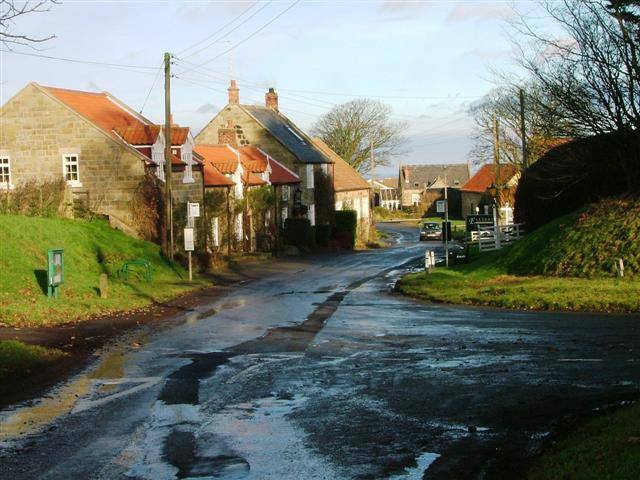
- Looking north into Ellerby village

- Location within North Yorkshire
- Population: 30 (2001 census)
- OS grid reference: NZ799146
- Civil parish: Ellerby
- Unitary authority: North Yorkshire
- Ceremonial county: North Yorkshire
- Region: Yorkshire and the Humber
- Country: England
- Sovereign state: United Kingdom
- Post town: SALTBURN-BY-THE-SEA
- Postcode district: TS13
- Police: North Yorkshire
- Fire: North Yorkshire
- Ambulance: Yorkshire
- UK Parliament: Scarborough and Whitby

Ellerby is a village and civil parish in the county of North Yorkshire, England, located within the North York Moors National Park.

According to the 2001 UK census, Ellerby parish had a population of 30. The population remained less than 100 at the 2011 census. Details were included in the civil parish of Mickleby.

From 1974 to 2023 it was part of the Borough of Scarborough. It is now administered by the unitary North Yorkshire Council.

== See also ==
- Listed buildings in Ellerby, North Yorkshire
