= Goldsborough, Lythe =

Hamlet in North Yorkshire, England

Coordinates: 54.520210°N 0.709600°W

Goldsborough
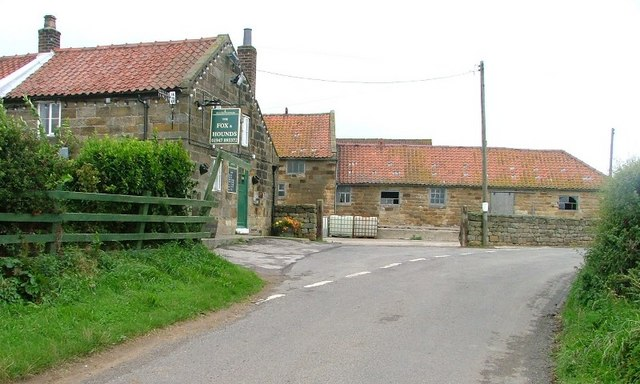
- Fox and Hounds public house

- Location within North Yorkshire
- OS grid reference: NZ836146
- Civil parish: Lythe
- Unitary authority: North Yorkshire
- Ceremonial county: North Yorkshire
- Region: Yorkshire and the Humber
- Country: England
- Sovereign state: United Kingdom
- Post town: WHITBY
- Postcode district: YO21
- Dialling code: 01947
- Police: North Yorkshire
- Fire: North Yorkshire
- Ambulance: Yorkshire
- UK Parliament: Scarborough and Whitby

Goldsborough is a small hamlet in the civil parish of Lythe, North Yorkshire, England within the North York Moors National Park. It is situated a few miles west of Whitby.

From 1974 to 2023 it was part of the Borough of Scarborough, it is now administered by the unitary North Yorkshire Council.

It was the site of a Roman signal station.

== Geography ==
Located at a longitudinal 54° 31' 14' North and at a latitude of 0° 41' 28' West, the hamlet is in proximity to natural landmarks, like the Goldsborough Cliffs. These cliffs, located immediately to the east of the village, are accessible at low tide from Runswick Bay or Kettleness.

== See also ==
- Listed buildings in Lythe
