= Sandsend =

Village in North Yorkshire, England

Coordinates: 54°30′09″N 0°40′14″W

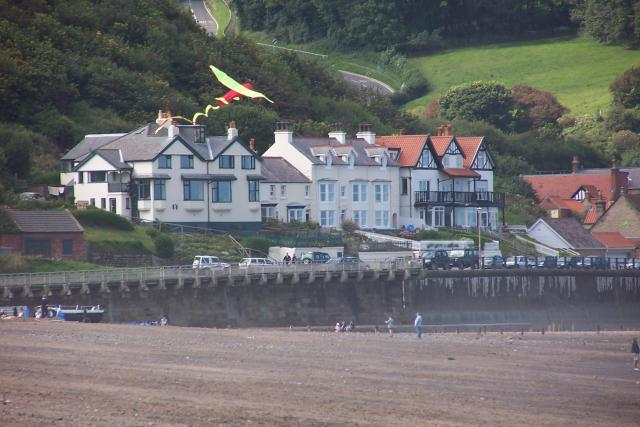
- Sandsend from Sandsend beach

- Location within North Yorkshire
- OS grid reference: NZ863125
- Civil parish: Lythe
- Unitary authority: North Yorkshire
- Ceremonial county: North Yorkshire
- Region: Yorkshire and the Humber
- Country: England
- Sovereign state: United Kingdom
- Police: North Yorkshire
- Fire: North Yorkshire
- Ambulance: Yorkshire
- UK Parliament: Scarborough and Whitby

Sandsend is a small fishing village, near to Whitby in North Yorkshire, England. It forms part of the civil parish of Lythe. It is the birthplace of fishing magnate George Pyman. Originally two villages, Sandsend and East Row, the united Sandsend has a pub and restaurant. A large part of the western side of the village, in The Valley, is still owned by the Mulgrave Estate. The Valley is one of the most expensive areas to buy property on the Yorkshire Coast.

== History ==
Sandsend and the neighbouring village of East Row began as separate villages but were joined when extra cottages were built for workers in the alum industry. The former Roman Cement Mill and lime kiln survive.

Sandsend was also buoyed by tourism from the Whitby, Redcar and Middlesbrough Union Railway, which ran through the village from 1855 to 1958. The local station was Sandsend railway station, which opened in 1883 and was closed in 1958.

From 1974 to 2023, Sandsend was part of the Borough of Scarborough; it is now administered by the unitary North Yorkshire Council.

== In popular culture ==
In the 1947 British comedy drama Holiday Camp, the opening shots of a train arriving at a cliff-top station and passengers boarding buses outside the station were filmed at Sandsend.

== Geography ==
Two becks empty into the North Sea at Sandsend: Sandsend Beck and East Row Beck. Both of these becks flow through Mulgrave Woods and were bridged by the railway on high viaducts across the village.

== Transport ==
The principal public transport serving Sandsend is the Arriva North East 4 and X4 bus service, which runs from Whitby up the coast to Middlesbrough. The main road through the town is the A174 which runs from Whitby to Thornaby-On-Tees.

Sandsend is located on the coastal part of the 110-mile (180 km) Cleveland Way and it follows the course of the old railway line northwards.

== Notable people ==
- George Pyman (1822–1900), shipping magnate

== See also ==
- Listed buildings in Lythe
- Sandsend Ness
- Sandsend Tunnel
