= Staithes and Runswick Lifeboat Station =

RNLI lifeboat station in North Yorkshire, England

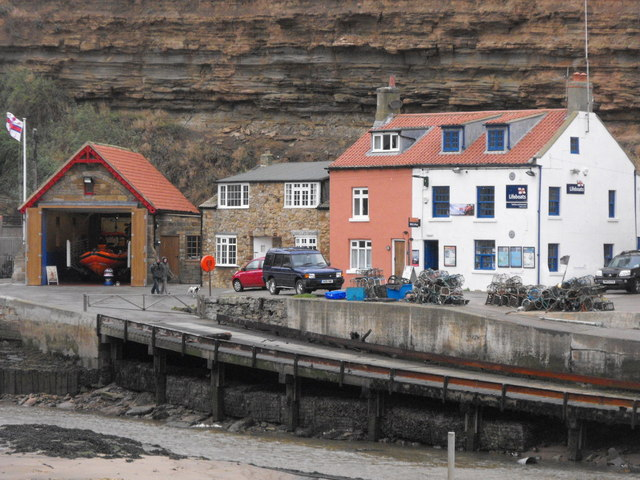
- Staithes and Runswick Lifeboat Station

- Location within North Yorkshire
- Former names: Staithes Lifeboat Station

General information
- Type: RNLI Lifeboat Station
- Location: Cowbar, North Side, Staithes, North Yorkshire, TS13 5BY, England
- Coordinates: 54.5597°N 0.7917°W
- Opened: 1875–1922; 1928–1938; 1978–present (ILB)
- Owner: Royal National Lifeboat Institution

Website
- Staithes and Runswick RNLI Lifeboat Station

Staithes and Runswick Lifeboat Station is located on the north side of the harbour, in Staithes, a village approximately 10 miles (16 km) north-west of Whitby, in the county of North Yorkshire, England.

Staithes Lifeboat Station was established in 1875 by the Royal National Lifeboat Institution (RNLI). It has been closed for two periods between 1922 and 1978, due to a decline in the fishing industry, and the availability of local crew. Staithes and Runswick Lifeboat Station was re-established in 1978 as an Inshore lifeboat station.

The station currently operates a B-class (Atlantic 85) Inshore lifeboat, Sheila & Dennis Tongue III (B-897), on station since 2016.

== History ==
A lifeboat was first placed at Runswick, just to the south of Staithes, in 1866. The RNLI had wished to station a lifeboat in Staithes by 1870, but had given up on the idea as there was a lack of suitable locations to site the lifeboat house.

In 1874, a wealthy donation, and a codicil in a will of a benefactor that stipulated that a lifeboat be stationed at Staithes, enabled the RNLI to press ahead with its plans. The crew used an old alum warehouse as a temporary lifeboat house, until one was built by the RNLI.

The lifeboat house was built at Staithes in 1875, and later modified in 1910. Both Staithes and Runswick lifeboat stations operated side by side, but a lack of crew, and a decline in the fishing fleet at Staithes, brought about the closure of Staithes in 1922.

The station was re-opened in 1928 after the Ministry of Agriculture and Fisheries installed a harbour and breakwaters. This created a resurgence in fishing from Staithes, and the RNLI once again provided a lifeboat. The resurgence was short lived however, and the station closed again in 1938.

In January 1978, the site was used as a test-bed for the new Atlantic 21-class lifeboats. After an acceptance trial, it was decided to re-open the station at Staithes.

Staithes lifeboat station officially re-opened on 17 June 1978, with Runswick closing on 30 June 1978. The station, now named Staithes and Runswick Lifeboat Station, had been operational since April 1978, when the first new ILB had been sent for trials. The Staithes lifeboat occupied the same station that had been built in 1875; this building is now grade II listed.

The lifeboat house is on a stretch of land known as the "Cowbar" and the slipway gentle curves towards the bay allowing the lifeboat to be launched by a tractor.

The people of Runswick Bay later instituted their own Independent lifeboat, which is known as the Runswick Bay Rescue Boat (RBRB). By 1984, the RBRB was fully accredited with the coastguard and is part of the overall response to emergencies in the north east region, being seen as a complement to the RNLI services, not competing or hindering them.

The station has a yearly Lifeboat Weekend. The event sees a nightgown parade, a fireworks display and demonstrations at sea, and usually has over 2,000 people attending. The event is held across both villages of Staithes and Runswick.

Also occurring yearly is an auction held in the Cod and Lobster public house in the village, raising money for the RNLI lifeboat in the village. In 2023, the auction raised £6,050 for the Staithes and Runswick RNLI lifeboat.

== Notable callouts ==
- 27 November 1888 - a great storm raged on the sea, and the Staithes lifeboat went out to aid the return of forty-five fishing cobles. The final launch to bring the last coble back to port was feared to be a disaster when the storm worsened overnight; neither ship was sighted, and also, two bodies were washed ashore. Whilst those on the coble were not saved, the crew and boat battled through the storm with significant damage to the lifeboat. The lifeboat crew were picked up by a passing steamer and dropped off at Middlesbrough. One of the lifeboat crewmen was drowned and his body was washed ashore a day later. At the inquiry it was noted that;
  ...the boat was in every respect staunch and seaworthy, but that on her being launched by a strange crew for the first time, the brass ventilators opening into the air-chambers below deck were not screwed down, and consequently, when on her second voyage, she shipped in heavy seas and the air-cases filled with water and she capsized.
- 8 August 2018 - the crew were called out to a nine year-old child who had been trapped by a rockfall on the beach.

== Station honours ==
The following are awards made at Staithes and Runswick.

- RNLI Bronze Medal

Stephen Iredale, Helm – 2000

- The Walter and Elizabeth Groombridge Award 2000
  (for the outstanding inshore lifeboat rescue of the year)

Stephen Iredale, Helm – 2000 - Staithes

- The Thanks of the Institution inscribed on Vellum

David Porritt, Helm – 1996

Sean Baxter, Helm – 1996

- A Framed Letter of Thanks signed by the Chairman of the Institution

Martin Hopkinson, crew member – 1996

- A Collective Letter of Thanks signed by the Chairman of the Institution

Iain Baxter, crew member – 1996
Jason Edison, crew member – 1996
Martin Hopkinson, crew member – 1996
David Porritt, crew member – 1996
Lee Porritt, crew member – 1996
David Springett, crew member – 1996
Michael Verrill, crew member – 1996

- Member, Order of the British Empire (MBE)

William James

James Clemence James – 1989NYH

- RNLI Silver Statue

James Wright – 2004

== Roll of honour ==
In memory of those lost whilst serving the Staithes and Runswick lifeboat.

- Died after being thrown on the rocks, when the lifeboat Winefride Mary Hopps (ON 107) capsized on service to a fishing coble, November 1888

John Crookes, crew member (40)

- Died after saving a school boy, and attempting to save a man in the harbour, 28 August 1957.

George Hanson, Head Launcher (52)

- Collapsed and died of a heart attack, during launch preparations of the Atlantic 21, to the fishing vessel Nicola Jane, 2 April 1990

John Robert Baxter, Tractor Driver (62)

== Staithes and Runswick lifeboats ==
=== Pulling and Sailing (P&S) lifeboats (Staithes) ===
ON (Note: ON is the RNLI's Official Number of the boat.)	Name	Built	On station	Class	Comments
Pre-587	Hannah Somerset	1874	1875–1887	32-foot Prowse Self-righting (P&S)	(Note: 32-foot x 8-foot (10-oared) Prowse-class self-righting (P&S) lifeboat, legacy of Mrs H. Yates of Sheffield, built by Woolfe of Shadwell, London, costing £282.)
107	Winefride Mary Hopps	1887	1887–1894	34-foot Self-righting (P&S)	(Note: 34-foot x 7-foot 6in (10-oared) self-righting (P&S) lifeboat, legacy of Mr G. W. Hopps of Finchley, built by Woolfe of Shadwell, London, costing £349.)
369	Jonathan Stott	1894	1894–1904	34-foot Self-righting (P&S)	(Note: 34-foot x 7-foot 6in (10-oared) self-righting (P&S) lifeboat, legacy of Mr James Stott of Rastrick, built by Woolfe of Shadwell, London, costing £439.)
378	Elizabeth and Blanche	1895	1904–1907	36-foot Self-righting (P&S)	(Note: 34-foot x 7-foot 6in (10-oared) self-righting (P&S) lifeboat, legacy of Mr James Stott of Rastrick, built by Woolfe of Shadwell, London, costing £439 when new.); Reserve Lifeboat No.4, previously at Penzance
572	James Gowland	1907	1907–1922	35-foot Self-righting (P&S)	(Note: 35-foot x 8-foot 3in (10-oared) self-righting (P&S) lifeboat, legacy of Mr J. Gowland of Harston, Cambridgeshire, built by Thames Ironworks and Shipbuilding Company of Blackwall, London, costing £995.)
Station Closed 1922–1928
447	John Anthony	1900	1928–1938	34-foot Rubie Self-righting (P&S)	(Note: 34-foot x 8-foot (10-oared) Dungeness-class (Rubie) self-righting (P&S) lifeboat, legacy of Dr J. Anthony of Edgbaston, built by Thames Ironworks and Shipbuilding Company of Blackwall, London, costing £661.); Previously at Blyth.

Lifeboat was withdrawn, and the station closed again in 1938
Pre ON numbers are unofficial numbers used by the Lifeboat Enthusiast Society to reference early lifeboats not included on the official RNLI list.

=== Inshore lifeboats (Staithes and Runswick) ===
Op. No. (Note: Op. No. is the RNLI's Operational Number of the boat carried on the hull.)	Name	On station	Class	Comments
B-506	Unnamed	1978	B-class (Atlantic 21)	ILB Station opened March 1978
B-538	Lord Brotherton	1978–1989	B-class (Atlantic 21)	
B-576	Ellis Sinclair	1989–2002	B-class (Atlantic 21)	
B-788	Pride of Leicester	2002–2016	B-class (Atlantic 75)	
B-897	Sheila & Dennis Tongue III	2016–	B-class (Atlantic 85)	

=== Launch and recovery tractors ===
Op. No.	Reg. No.	Type,	On station	Comments
TW05	UJT 151S	Talus MB-764 County	1978–1987	
TW11	B251 HUX	Talus MB-764 County	1987–1992	
TW09	PEL 169W	Talus MB-764 County	1992–1993	
TW30	L123 HUX	Talus MB-764 County	1993–1998	
TW11	B251 HUX	Talus MB-764 County	1998–2003	
TW55Hc	DU52 XGA	Talus MB-4H Hydrostatic (Mk2)	2003–2011	
TW54Hc	DU02 WEJ	Talus MB-4H Hydrostatic (Mk2)	2011–2012	
TW53Hb	DU51 FET	Talus MB-4H Hydrostatic (Mk1.5)	2012–	

== See also ==
- List of RNLI stations
- List of former RNLI stations
- Royal National Lifeboat Institution lifeboats
