= Runswick Bay Rescue Boat =

Lifeboat station in North Yorkshire, England

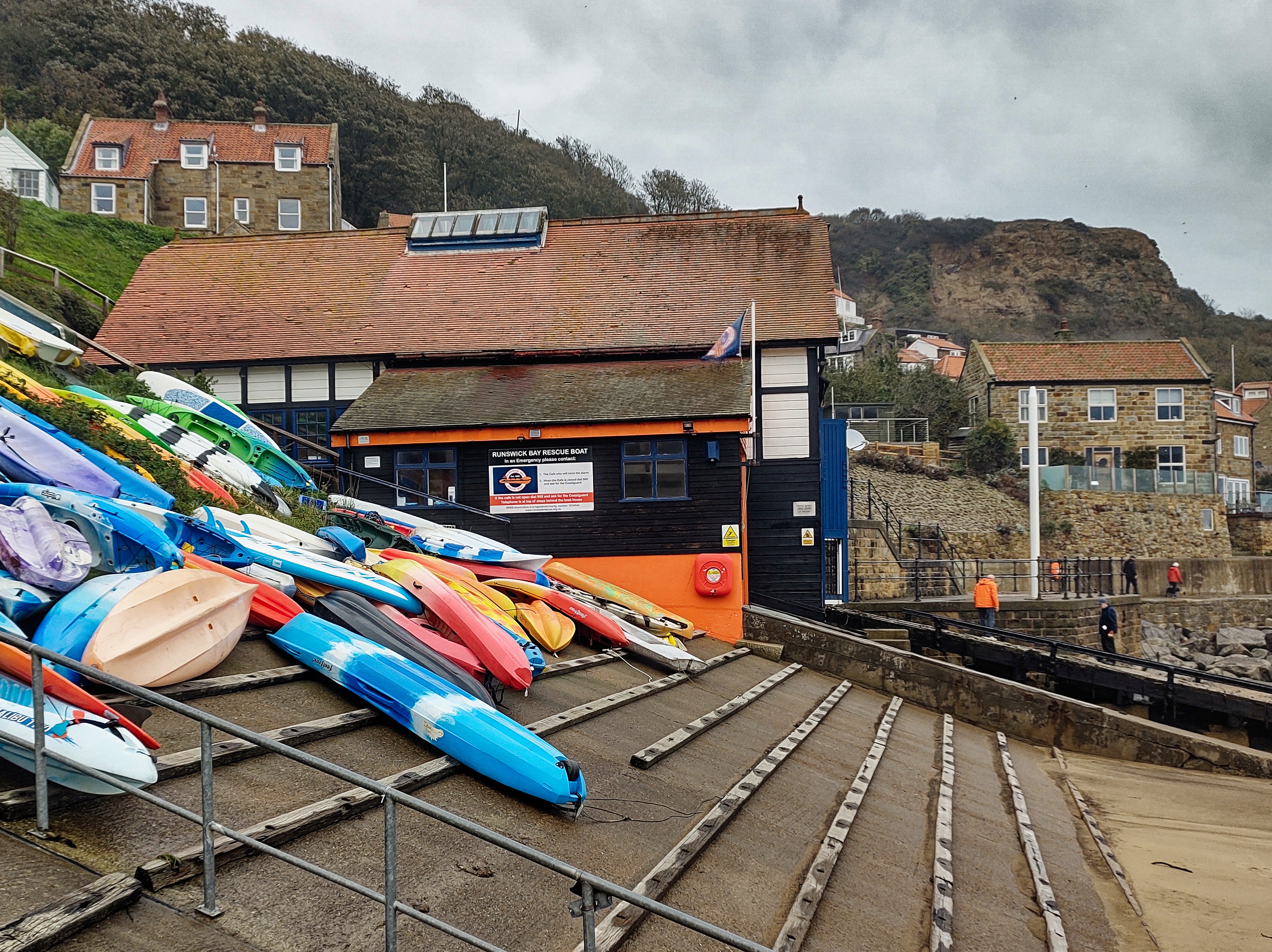
- Runswick Bay Rescue Boat House
- Interactive map of the Runswick Bay Rescue Boat area

General information
- Type: Lifeboat Station
- Location: The Lifeboathouse, Runswick Bay, North Yorkshire, TS13 5HT, England
- Coordinates: 54°31′59.3″N 0°44′59.9″W
- Opened: 1982
- Owner: Runswick Bay Rescue Boat

Website
- Runswick Bay Rescue Boat

Runswick Bay Rescue Boat operates out of the former RNLI Tractor shed, and is located in the village of Runswick Bay, in the county of North Yorkshire, in England.

Runswick Lifeboat Station was opened here in 1866 by the Royal National Lifeboat Institution (RNLI). The station remained in operation until 1978, when the All-weather lifeboat was withdrawn, and the former station at nearby Staithes was reopened as an Inshore lifeboat station.

A rescue service was re-established in 1982 by the locally formed Runswick Bay Rescue Boat Association (RBRB).

RBRB currently operate a 4.8 m (16 ft) Ribcraft RIB, Spirit of Nagar, on station since 2020.

== History ==
After the RNLI withdrew the Runswick lifeboat in 1978, and placed an Inshore lifeboat at Staithes, it was felt that due to the popularity of the bay, particularly in the holiday season, there would need some sort of rescue cover. A meeting was held in 1980, and the local population at Runswick Bay set about to raise £4000 for their own rescue boat.

With loans and a bank overdraft, a 16 ft (4.9 m) Humber Semi-Rigid Inflatable Inshore lifeboat (S-RIB) was purchased, similar to the RNLI D-class. Equipped with safety equipment and VHF radio, and with a 40 hp Mariner engine, the boat was named Claymoor. The boat was only on service during the summer season, and is housed in the former RNLI tractor storage shed.

Almost immediately, the boat proved its worth. The boat was called out 12 times in the first year, and at least 2 lives were saved. In the second year, determined fundraising managed to clear the loans and overdraft. The boat was called nine times in 1983. Claymoor would be called 35 times during her four seasons on station.

Claymoor was retired in 1986, and a slightly larger 17 ft (5.2 m) boat was acquired, to be named Christine Appleton, in memory of the late wife of the RBRB secretary. Christine Appleton would be called upon 30 times during a five-year period on service.

Following several winter time incidents in the Bay, in 1987, it was decided to extend the normal Easter to October period of operation, to all-year-round cover. This placed a great pressure on a few personnel, and with a later decline in local activity, the decision was taken to return to seasonal cover in 2005.

In 1991, the RBRB received official recognition from H.M. Coastguard, when it was made a fully declared asset within the sea rescue organisation. This means that H.M. Coastguard recognise that the station has specific equipment, and all crew have received a required level of training, in order that they can then be reliably called upon to provide rescue services.

The RBRB works alongside the RNLI to provide a rescue service in Runswick Bay, particularly along the shoreline where the larger rescue boats have trouble getting in close.

=== Runswick Bay Rescue Boats ===
Name	In service	Type	Comments
Claymoor	1982–1985	16 ft (4.9 m) Humber S-RIB	(Note: 16 ft (4.9 m) Humber Semi-rigid Inflatable, with single 40hp Mariner engine.)
Christine Appleton	1986–1991	17 ft (5.2 m) Humber S-RIB	(Note: 17 ft (5.2 m) Humber Semi-rigid Inflatable, with single 40hp Mariner engine.)
Lady Normanby	1992–2000	17 ft (5.2 m) Humber S-RIB	(Note: 17 ft (5.2 m) Humber 'Deep V' Semi-rigid Inflatable, with single 55hp Mercury engine.)
Enita Margaret	2000–2006	18 ft (5.5 m) Humber S-RIB	(Note: 187 ft (57 m) Humber 'Deep V' Semi-rigid Inflatable, with single 55hp Mercury engine.)
Spirit of Runswick	2007–2010	5 m (16 ft) Humber Assault RIB	(Note: 5.0 m (16.4 ft) Humber Assault RIB, with single 50hp Mariner engine.)
Spirit II	2011–2020	4.2 m (14 ft) Gemini Marine GRX420 S-RIB	(Note: 4.2 m (14 ft) Gemini Marine GRX420 catamaran-hull Semi-rigid Inflatable, with single 50hp Mariner engine.)
Freebird Fojt	2015–	4.2 m (14 ft) Gemini Marine GRX420 S-RIB	(Note: 4.2 m (14 ft) Gemini Marine GRX420 catamaran-hull Semi-rigid Inflatable, with single 50hp Mariner engine.)
Spirit of Nagar	2020–	4.8 m (16 ft) Ribcraft S-RIB	(Note: 4.8 m (16 ft) Ribcraft Semi-rigid Inflatable, with single 50hp Mariner engine.)

== See also ==
- List of RNLI stations
- List of former RNLI stations
- Independent lifeboats in Britain and Ireland
