= Willie Rawson =

English painter

Runswick Bay, Yorkshire

William Rawson (19 September 1865 – 6 August 1949) was an English painter known for his drypoint etchings and water colours of the moorlands around Sheffield. He lived at 321 Chesterfield Road in Sheffield.
