= Runswick Lifeboat Station =

Lifeboat station in North Yorkshire, England

Runswick RNLI Lifeboat Station

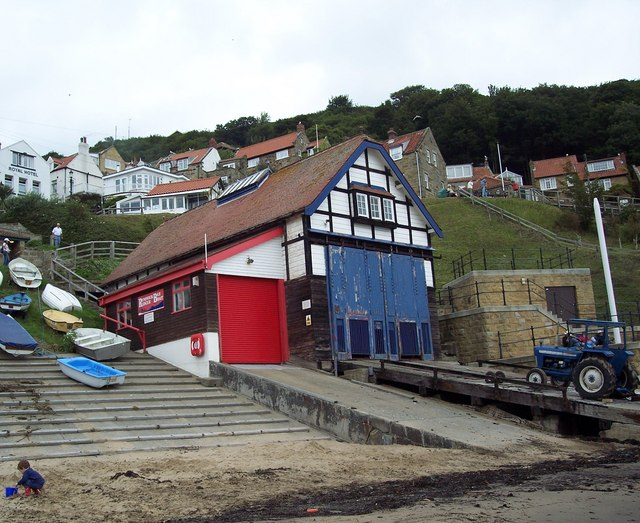
- 1910 Runswick Lifeboat Station;

- Location within North Yorkshire

General information
- Type: RNLI Lifeboat Station
- Location: Runswick Bay, North Yorkshire, England
- Coordinates: 54.5332°N 0.7499°W
- Opened: 1866–1978

Runswick RNLI Lifeboat Station was located in the village of Runswick Bay, approximately 7 mi (11 km) north-west of Whitby, in the county of North Yorkshire, England.

A lifeboat station was established here in 1866 by the Royal National Lifeboat Institution (RNLI).

In 1978, the nearby lifeboat station at Staithes was reopened as in inshore lifeboat station, and renamed Staithes and Runswick Lifeboat Station. The Runswick All-weather lifeboat 37-11 The Royal Thames (ON 978) was withdrawn, and Runswick Lifeboat Station closed.

Following a meeting of the local population, and with the view that a rescue service was still required, the Independent Runswick Bay Rescue Boat was established in 1982.

== History ==
At a meeting of the RNLI committee of management on Thursday 1 February 1866, the report of the Inspector of Lifeboats was approved, following his visit to Runswick. The October 1866 edition of the RNLI journal 'The Lifeboat', reported of the establishment of a new station at Runswick, in response to the loss of life from a local shipwreck during the previous winter.

The new 32-foot (9.8 m) self-righting 'Pulling and Sailing' (P&S) lifeboat, one with sails and (ten) oars, along with its carriage, was transported from London to Whitby free of charge, by the Great Northern and North Eastern railway companies, from where the boat was towed by steamer to its station. Funded by the Sheffield Lifeboat Fund, primarily through the efforts of former mayor Thomas Jessop, the lifeboat was according named Sheffield, where it had been exhibited prior to its arrival at Runswick.

In April 1901, all the fit and able men were fishing in the bay, when a sudden storm erupted over the area. Older men from the village were drafted in to crew the lifeboat, but it was hauled into the sea by the women of the village.

A new station was erected on the site of the previous lifeboat house in 1910. The enlarged station was necessary to accommodate the new 35-foot (11 m) lifeboat Hester Rothschild (ON 612).

In 1933, a new motor-powered Liverpool-class lifeboat was received on station, provisionally named The Always Ready (ON 766). Soon afterwards, Coxswain Robert Patton died nine days after being injured whilst attempting to rescue a disabled seaman. At the official naming ceremony in 1934, the lifeboat was named Robert Patton - The Always Ready.

On the evening of 28 August 1957, schoolmaster Christopher Jardine took a party of schoolchildren to bathe in the harbour, despite a rough sea and flood tide. Shouts for help were soon heard by head lifeboat launcher George Hanson, who jumped into the water fully-clothed, and rescued one boy. He then went out again to assist the schoolmaster, but collapsed face-down in the water.

Two local men, Stephen Jackson and James Wright, along with lifeboat coxswain Frank Verill, put out in a small boat, and brought Mr Hanson ashore, but he died soon afterwards. The search continued for Mr Jardine, whose body was found after dark. A memorial clock and barometer in memory of George Hanson was later erected in the village. A pension was granted to Mr. Hanson's widow by the Carnegie Hero Fund Trust.

In 1978, following a coastal review by the RNLI, the lifeboat station at Staithes was re-opened as an inshore lifeboat station. With motor-powered lifeboats at Whitby and Teesmouth, the Runswick station was closed. Staithes lifeboat station was renamed Staithes and Runswick Lifeboat Station. The Runswick lifeboat, The Royal Thames (ON 978), was transferred to Pwllheli.

Following the withdrawal of the Runswick lifeboat, it was still felt that with the popularity of the bay, particularly in the holiday season, some sort of rescue cover was still required. A meeting was held in 1980, and the local population at Runswick Bay set about to raise £4000 for their own rescue boat. Runswick Bay Rescue Boat (RBRB) was established at Runswick Bay in 1982, and this now operates in conjunction with all rescue services on the coast, coordinated by HMCG.

For more information about the current rescue service, please see:–

- Runswick Bay Rescue Boat

== Coxswain Robert Patton ==
At 04:25 on 8 February 1934, the new Runswick lifeboat The Always Ready (ON 766) launched to the aid of the steamship Disperser, which had started to sink whilst under tow in gale force conditions. Seven of the eight crew were taken off by the tugboat, but the eighth, a young man with a physical handicap, was still aboard. Reaching the vessel an hour after launch, the lifeboat eventually managed to get alongside. However, the man didn't jump, but lowered himself over the side, and then wouldn't let go. Coxswain Patton grabbed the man, but still he wouldn't let go. As the lifeboat was swept away, the Coxswain was left clinging to the man, and then fell into the sea. He was crushed three times as the lifeboat moved in and out to the vessel. The man was eventually dragged into the lifeboat, but the Coxswain had been badly injured, and was taken to hospital with broken ribs, a broken pelvis, fractured vertebrae, and other injuries. Visited in hospital by a representative of the Institution, he said, "I could not let the poor lad go, as he might have drowned". Patton died nine days after the event.

Robert Patton, Coxswain of Runswick Lifeboat, was posthumously awarded the RNLI's highest honour, the RNLI Gold Medal. The medal, and the vote, inscribed on vellum, and signed by H.R.H. Prince of Wales, president of the Institution, was presented to Mrs Patton by the Prince of Wales in London on 20 April 1934.

At a ceremony on 20 September 1934, the new lifeboat, The Always Ready (ON 766), which had not yet been officially named, was named Robert Patton–The Always Ready by the Princess Royal.

== Station honours ==
The following are awards made at Runswick.

- RNLI Gold Medal
  Robert Patton, Coxswain – 1934 (posthumous)
- RNLI Silver Medal
  George Tose, Coxswain – 1893
- RNLI Bronze Medal
  Andrew Tose, Coxswain – 1924
  Thomas Patton, Second Coxswain – 1924
- Memorial Certificate, awarded by the Carnegie Hero Fund Trust
  George Hanson – 1957 (post.)
- 'In Memorium' Testimonial, awarded by the Royal Humane Society
  George Hanson – 1957 (post.)

== Roll of honour ==
In memory of those lost whilst serving Runswick lifeboat.

- Died nine days later from his injuries received on service to the steamship Disperser, 8 February 1934
  Robert Patton, Coxswain (46)
- Drowned during the attempted rescue of a man in the harbour, 28 August 1957.
  George Hanson, Head launcher (52)

== Runswick RNLI lifeboats ==
=== Pulling and Sailing (P&S) lifeboats ===
ON (Note: ON is the RNLI's Official Number of the boat.)	Name	Built	On station	Class	Comments
Pre-463	Sheffield	1866	1866–1880	32-foot Prowse Self-righting (P&S)	(Note: 32-foot x 7-foot 5in (10-oared) Prowse-class self-righting (P&S) lifeboat, gift of Sheffield LB fund, built by Forrestt of Limehouse, London, costing £242.)
207	Margaret and Edward	1879	1880–1893	34-foot Self-righting (P&S)	(Note: 34-foot x 8-foot (10-oared) self-righting (P&S) lifeboat, gift of an anonymous 'lady' from Brighton, built by Woolfe of Shadwell, London, costing £363.)
341	Cape of Good Hope	1893	1893–1908	34-foot Self-righting (P&S)	(Note: 34-foot x 7-foot 6in (10-oared) self-righting (P&S) lifeboat, legacy of Mt C. Hawkins of London, built by Forrestt of Limehouse, London, costing £424.)
455	Forester	1900	1908–1910	34-foot Dungeness Self-righting (P&S)	(Note: 34-foot x 8-foot (10-oared) Dungeness-class (Rubie) self-righting (P&S) lifeboat, gift of the Ancient Order of Foresters, built by Thames Ironworks of Blackwall, London, costing £712.)
612	Hester Rothschild	1910	1910–1933	35-foot Rubie Self-righting (P&S)	(Note: 35-foot x 8-foot 10in (10-oared) Rubie self-righting (P&S) lifeboat, legacy of Mrs L. Halfron of Paris, built by Thames Ironworks of Blackwall, London, costing £965.)

=== Motor lifeboats ===
ON	Op. No. (Note: Op. No. is the RNLI's Operational Number of the boat carried on the hull.)	Name	Built	On station	Class	Comments
766	–	The Always Ready	1933	1933–1934	Liverpool	Officially named Robert Patton–The Always Ready in 1934.
766	–	Robert Patton–The Always Ready	1933	1934–1953	Liverpool	Officially named Robert Patton–The Always Ready in 1934.
918	–	The Elliot Gill	1953	1954–1970	Liverpool	
978	37-11	The Royal Thames	1964	1970–1978	37-foot Oakley	Previously at Caister

RNLI Station closed in 1978.
Pre ON numbers are unofficial numbers used by the Lifeboat Enthusiasts' Society to reference early lifeboats not included on the official RNLI list.

=== Launch and recovery tractors ===
Op. No.	Reg. No.	Type	On station	Comments
T16	YW 3377	Clayton	1940–1942	
T16	PY 7589	Clayton	1942–1949	
T46	KGP 1	Case LA	1949–1957	
T54	KXX 566	Case LA	1957–1966	
T55	KXX 565	Case LA	1966–1969	
T66	XYP 400	Fowler Challenger III	1969–1974	
T57	NYE 351	Fowler Challenger III	1974–1976	
T62	PLA 698	Fowler Challenger III	1976–1978	

== See also ==
- List of RNLI stations
- List of former RNLI stations
- Independent lifeboats in Britain and Ireland
- Royal National Lifeboat Institution lifeboats
