= Hob Holes =

Caves in Scarborough, England

Coordinates: 54.52801°N 0.7421°W

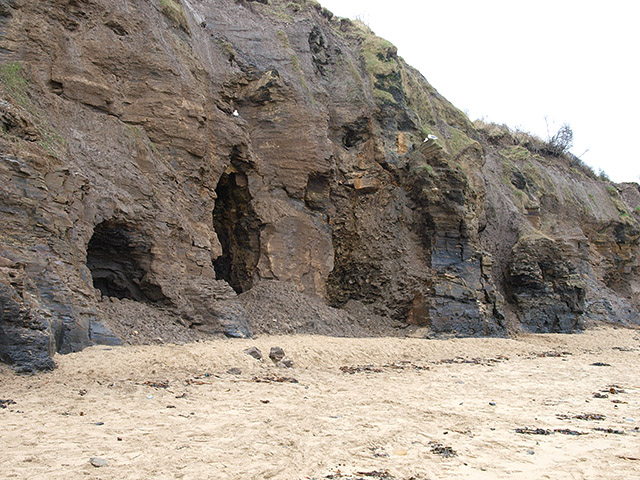

The Hob Holes are caves in the cliffs of Runswick Bay, Scarborough, England which resulted from mining for jet – fossilised wood which is valuable as a gemstone.

A hobgoblin, a bogle, or a hob was rumored to live there. Local mothers would visit the site with their children during low tide, seeking a remedy for whooping cough by calling on the spirit with the words:

Hob Hole hob, my child has the kin cough,
Take it off, Take it off!

One account mentions that, apart from aiding with childhood illnesses, the hob would roam the moors behind the bay with a lantern, luring travelers into the rocky pits. On stormy nights, he would offer shelter in his hole, only to abandon them to the rising tide.
