= Penzance Lifeboat Station =

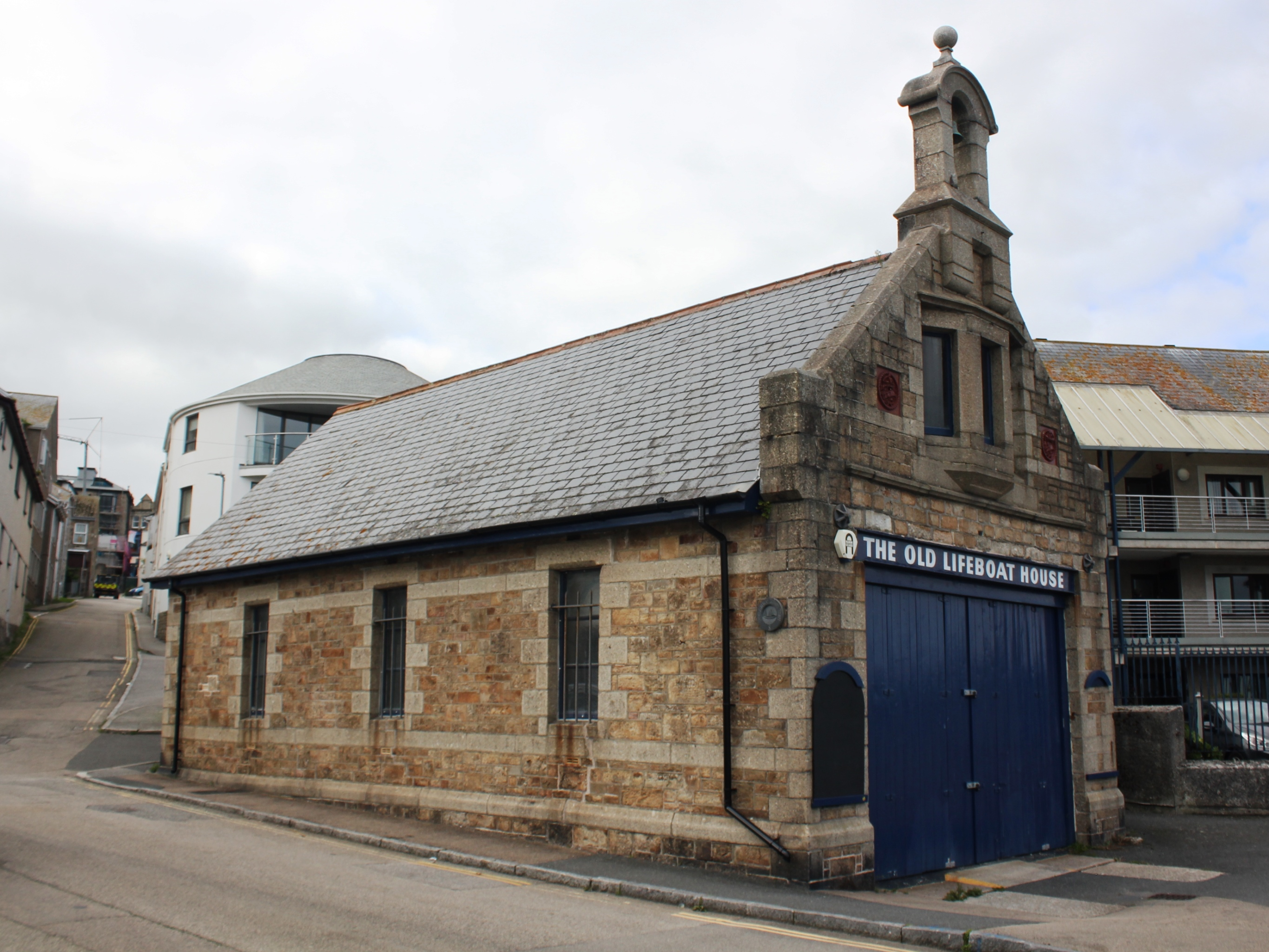
- The 1884 lifeboat house photographed in 2024

- Map of Cornwall showing Penzance

General information
- Type: Lifeboat Station
- Location: Penzance, Wharf Road, Penzance, TR18 4AA, United Kingdom
- Coordinates: 50.1188°N 5.5335°W
- Opened: First lifeboat 1803; Surviving building 1884; 142 years ago
- Cost: £575 6s 6d

Listed Building – Grade II
- Official name: Former Penzance lifeboat house
- Designated: 16 March 1987
- Reference no.: 1210218

Penzance Lifeboat Station was the base for Royal National Lifeboat Institution (RNLI) operations in Mount's Bay in Cornwall, United Kingdom. The first lifeboat to be placed at Penzance was in 1803 but a permanent station was not established until 1853. It closed in 1917 by which time the Penlee Lifeboat Station had been established.

== History ==
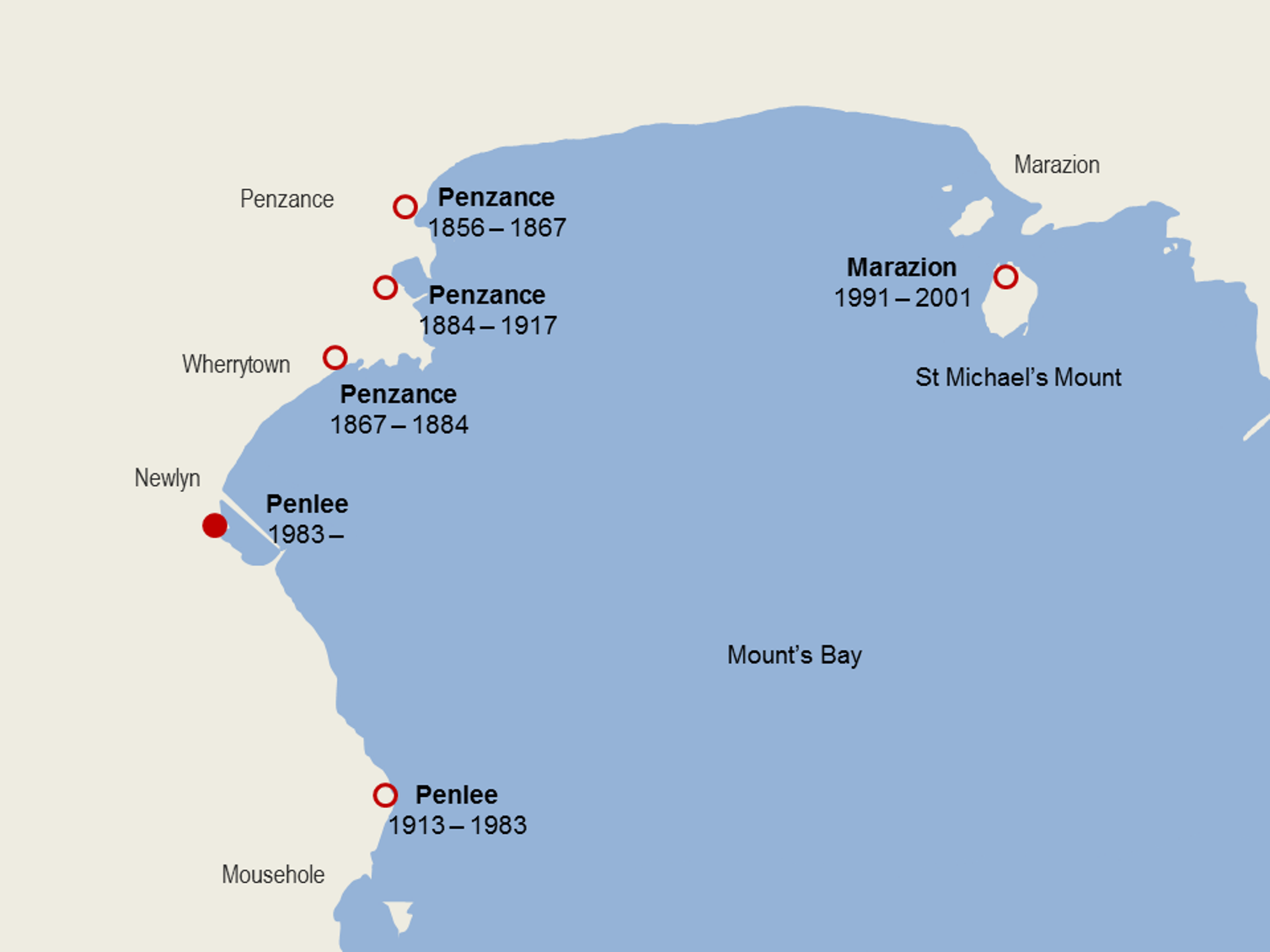
Map showing the various lifeboat stations around Mounts Bay. The Penzance stations are at top left.

The first lifeboat in Cornwall was purchased for Penzance in 1803. Part of its cost was paid by Lloyd's of London but it was sold in 1812 without ever being used in service. The National Institution for the Preservation of Life from Shipwreck (as the RNLI was originally known) was formed in 1824 and a district association of the national institution was soon formed at Penzance. A lifeboat was stationed in the town from 1826 but was wrecked in 1827 or 1828.

The station then lapsed until 1853 when a lifeboat was again stationed in the town. It was kept at several different places around the town until a boathouse was built in 1856 for £88 at the site that is now the entrance to the Penzance railway station. There was local controversy when the boat was unable to launch on several occasions in 1862. As a consequence there was a proposal to move the lifeboat to Newlyn, which would have been unpopular with the residents of Penzance. As a compromise the lifeboat station moved to Wherrytown on the edge of Penzance, where a timber lifeboat house was opened in 1867 at the bottom of Alexandra Road near the Coastguard Station. It later was decided to move back to Penzance harbour so in 1884 a new boathouse was built at the foot of Jennings Street, at a cost of £575 6s 6d. This was paid for by a £1,000 gift from Henry Martin Harvey of Hexworthy, which also paid for a new lifeboat, the Dora, and a carriage.

The Penzance lifeboat was moved to Newlyn in 1908 and a second hand boat placed at Penzance in its stead. The Newlyn lifeboat was moved to a new station at Penlee Point in 1913. Penzance's station was closed in 1917 and the boathouse sold to the town council

== Buildings ==
The boathouses of 1856 and 1867 no longer exist, but the 1884 boathouse still stands on the landward side of Wharf Road at the corner Jennings Street. It is a single-storey building of coursed Lamorna granite with ashlar dressings and a slate roof. It was equipped with a small bell turret and bell, and there are two terracotta panels RNLI roundels set into the wall, one with the royal crown and date 1884, the other depicting a lifeboat with the initials RNLBI. It was given listed building status in 1987 and is now a restaurant.

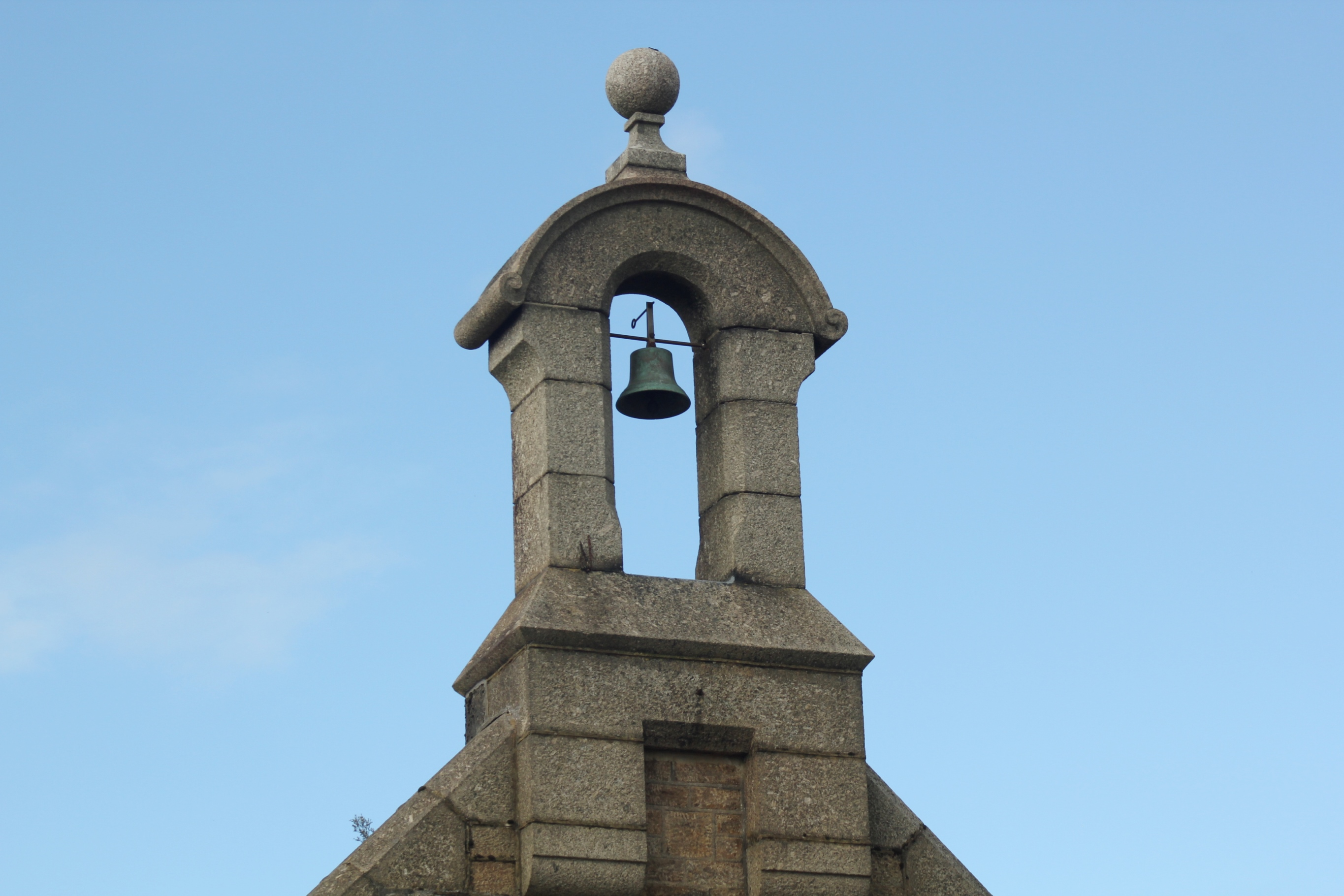
Bell turret

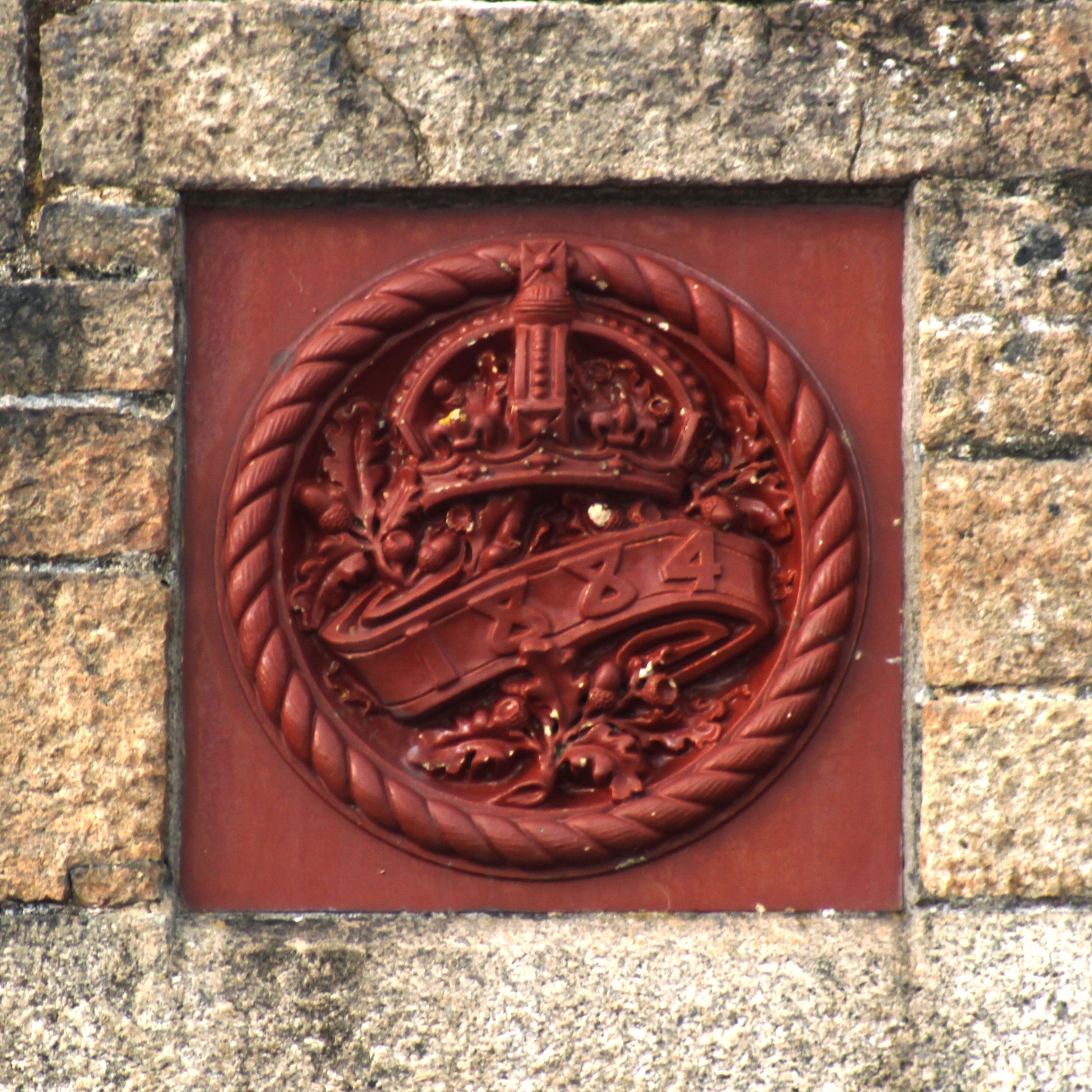
Terracotta date panel

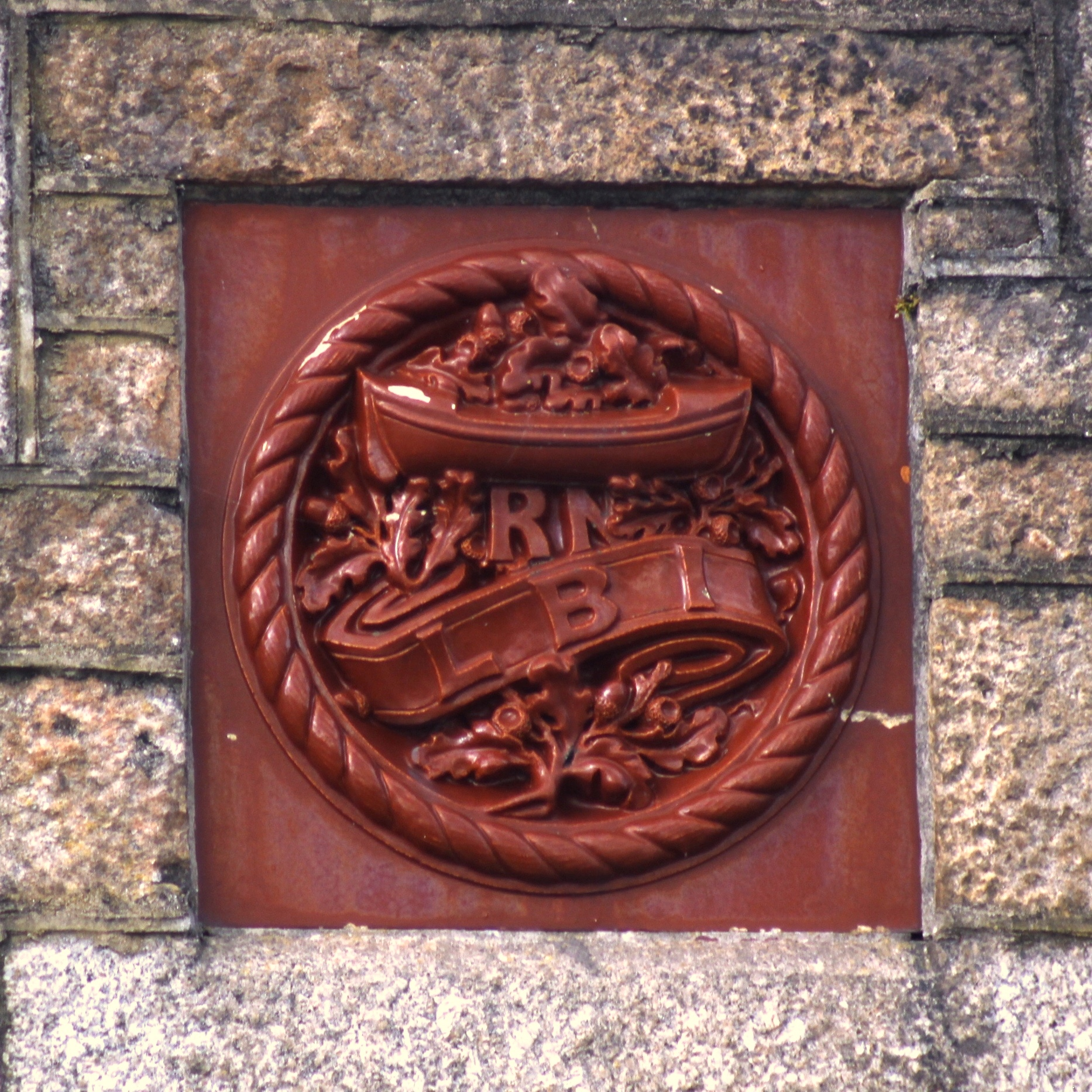
Terracotta panel with initials

== Service awards ==
The only record of the lifeboat Alexandria being involved in a rescue was on 29 January 1865. After two attempted launches that were unsuccessful because of the weather, it was taken to Newlyn. The crew then rowed back to where the Willie Ridley of Plymouth was being blown towards rocks and took the men off the ship. An RNLI silver medal was awarded to Captain T.H. Fellowes, a Coastguard inspector who took command of the lifeboat as its coxswain was unavailable.

Penzance is on the south coast but on 11 January 1866 it was taken to Hayle on the north coast to assist the St Ives lifeboat that was trying to rescue the crew of a steam boat that had run aground on the sandbank at the entrance to the harbour in a gale. Thomas Carbis, the Penzance coxswain, was awarded a silver medal for his part in the rescue.

5 January 1867 was a bad day in Mount's Bay. Three different ships were wrecked in a gale and the lifeboat was twice taken from Penzance to Marazion to be launched. Crew member Samuel Higgs was given a silver medal for his work which helped save 17 people.

The barque North Britain got into trouble in Mount's Bay on 6 December 1868. The lifeboat Richard Lewis was taken to the beach and launched but some of the barque's crew had already taken to the ship's boats. One capsized and another was broken against the side of the larger ship. The people on the shore saved as many of these as they could. Meanwhile the lifeboat had a difficult time making headway. It capsized but it righted itself and most of the crew got back aboard although one was only saved by his lifejacket and a man riding out into the surf on his horse to pull him ashore. The coxswain got stuck under some wreckage but managed to free himself and was helped back into the lifeboat which had righted itself as it was designed to. It was rowed back to the shore so the injured and exhausted crew could be relieved. The second coxswain and a fresh crew put out again and saved the eight men still aboard the wrecked ship. Five silver medals were awarded on this occasion, to Coxswain Thomas Carbis, Second Coxswain Samuel Higgins, R.B. Cay, William Blackmore and Samuel Higgs Junior. Richard Lewis, the secretary of the RNLI after whom the lifeboat was named, made a special journey to Penzance to present the medals in a special ceremony at the Town Hall.

The Richard Lewis lifeboat was called out on two occasions early in 1873. A Norwegian ship, the Otto has blown ashore between Penzance and Marazion on 26 January. The crew of eight were saved. Just one week later, another storm on 2 February saw the American Marie Emilie run aground. It took the lifeboat three attempts to safely get in among the rocks to save the four people on board. The RNLI awarded silver medals to Captain Howorth, Nicholas Downing and William Blackmore for the two services; the Norwegian government also gave the three men silver medals for their deeds with the Otto.

== Lifeboats ==
At Penzance	ON	Name	Built	Class	Length	Comments
1803–1812	–		1803	Greathead	27 ft (8.2 m)	
1826–1828	–	–	1825	Plenty	24 ft (7.3 m)	
1853–1860	–	–	1853	Peake	30 ft (9.1 m)	Built in Penzance by Semmens & Thomas.
1860–1865	–	Alexandra	1860	Peake	30 ft (9.1 m)	Named in 1863.
1865–1884	–	Richard Lewis	1865	Standard Self–righter	32 feet (9.8 m)	
1884–1895	49	Dora	1884	Standard Self–righter	34 ft (10 m)	Sold 1895 and broken up in Ireland 1980.
1895–1899	378	Elizabeth and Blanche	1895	Standard Self–righter	36 ft (11 m)	
1899–1908	424	Elizabeth and Blanche	1899	Watson	38 ft (12 m)	Moved to Newlyn in 1908 and then to Penlee in 1913. Sold 1922 and last reported in use as a yacht at Falmouth in 1969.
1908–1912	341	Cape of Good Hope	1892	Standard Self–righter	34 ft (10 m)	Originally stationed at Runswick.
1912–1917	386	Janet Hoyle	1895	Standard Self–righter	34 ft (10 m)	Originally stationed at Ayr.

== See also ==
- List of former RNLI stations
- Royal National Lifeboat Institution lifeboats
