= Carnegie Hero Fund Trust =

Scottish charity

The Carnegie Hero Fund Trust is a Scottish charity. It was established in 1908 as a British extension to the Carnegie Hero Fund Commission which had been founded in 1904 in Pittsburgh, Pennsylvania. The Trust was founded upon a financial endowment from the Scottish philanthropist and steel magnate Andrew Carnegie. The purpose of the Trust is to provide payments to individuals who have been injured or financially disadvantaged as a result of undertaking an act of heroism or in fatal cases to provide for the family or other dependants. This has continued to be the aim of the Trust which each year considers around twelve cases of heroism within a geographical area encompassing Great Britain, Ireland, the Channel Islands and the surrounding territorial waters.

== History ==
The founding of the Carnegie Hero Fund Trust was announced in September 1908 with a bold statement from its benefactor, Andrew Carnegie, "Gentlemen…we live in a heroic age. Not seldom are we thrilled by acts of heroism where men or women are injured or lose their lives in attempting to preserve or rescue their fellows; such are the heroes of civilisation". Carnegie provided $1.25 million in bonds, yielding an annual income of £12,500, as a means to supporting the Trust’s work. Such an amount, Carnegie believed, would be sufficient to "meet the cost of maintaining injured heroes and their families during the disability of the heroes [and] the widows and children of heroes who may lose their lives". Essentially, the purpose of the Trust was to provide pensions or one-off payments to individuals who had been injured or financially disadvantaged as a result of undertaking an act of heroism or in the case of those who lost their lives through such an act, to provide for the family or other dependants.

In terms of inspiration for establishing the projects, the noted palaeontologist and first president of the Commission, William J. Holland, recalled a conversion with Carnegie a couple of years prior to the founding of the Commission when, following reports of a dramatic rescue from a burning building, Carnegie commented, ‘I intend some day to do something for such heroes. Heroes in civic life should be recognized’. However, there is evidence that Carnegie was interested and active in recognising civilian heroism long before that.

=== Memorial to William Hunter ===
On 25 July 1886, seventeen-year-old William Hunter was returning from a Sunday morning service at Townhill Church near Dunfermline in Scotland when he heard cries that a swimmer was in need of help at the town loch. A fifteen-year-old local lad, Andrew Robson, had attempted to swim the loch but had become entangled in a bed of pondweed from which he was unable to free himself. William, who had run to the spot, waded in and proceeded to swim out to Robson but was apparently struck with cramp and with a cry of "Chaps, I canna go further" he suddenly disappeared into the deep water. Robson was eventually saved through the use of a long ladder and, a short time afterwards, William’s lifeless body was recovered from the loch.

A subscription fund was established to recognise Hunter’s bravery and when Carnegie heard of this he donated £100 towards the creation of a memorial over the young man’s grave in Dunfermline Cemetery. Carnegie also contributed his sentiments to the inscription on the memorial, which includes the following quotation "The false heroes of barbarous man are those who can only boast of the destruction of their fellows. The true heroes of civilisation are those alone who save or greatly serve them. Young Hunter was one of those and deserves an enduring monument". So it would seem as though the will to recognise acts of civilian heroism had burned in Carnegie for many years before he actually established his projects.

=== Reasons for establishing the Hero Funds ===
Carnegie was a great believer that men who died rich died in disgrace and the various Hero Funds that he established were just one of the many charitable enterprises through which the philanthropist attempted to distribute his vast wealth. Recognising heroic individuals was a particularly suitable avenue for Carnegie because, by 1908, there was general public perception that heroism was the preserve of morally decent people and the performance of a heroic act was indicative of a respectable and upstanding character". Therefore, recognising acts of heroism provided Carnegie with a practical quality control mechanism through which bestow charity safe in the knowledge that it was going to suitably upstanding citizens.

A second motivation for establishing the Trust was related to Carnegie’s other great enthusiasm during his retirement years; his quest for world peace. Between 1904 and 1914 Carnegie gifted over $25 million to the cause of achieving world peace and it would appear that the Hero Fund Trust was part of that endeavour. Carnegie believed that those who saved life were every bit as worthy (if not more worthy) of praise and recognition than those who took life and that promoting and recognising civilian, rather than military, heroism would help to pave the way to world peace. For Carnegie, heroism was not something that could be ignored or overlooked, but was something that would find expression through one means or another, particularly in the case of young men for whom bravery and gallantry were something of a rite of passage. The Hero Fund Trust was designed to demonstrate to young men that there was just as much opportunity for heroism in peaceful pursuits as there was in military ones and thus direct their natural heroic impulses into, in Carnegie’s opinion, more desirable and peaceful areas.

=== The first Carnegie Hero Fund Trust Board of Trustees ===
The first Board of Trustees was made up of: sixteen life Trustees, originally appointed by Carnegie; six members appointed by the Corporation of Dunfermline; and a further three appointed by the School Board of Dunfermline. The 16 life Trustees were all members of the 1903 Carnegie Dunfermline Trust Board of Trustees and comprised:

- Sir Edward James Bruce, 10th Earl of Elgin, 14th Earl of Kincardine and distant relative to King Robert II.
- Hay Shennan, a dedicated advocate who spent much of his career in Sheriff-Substitute positions.
- Rev. Robert Stevenson, 1st charge at Dunfermline Abbey.
- James Macbeth, a lawyer and one of Scotland’s foremost practitioners of the Workmen’s Compensation Act and solicitor to the miner’s union.
- David Blair, who at his death aged ninety-two, was the oldest practicing lawyer in Dunfermline.
- Dr John Ross, who was the first Chairman of the Trust was best known for his thirty-five year association with the local school board and twenty years as Sheriff-Substitute. Ross was granted the freedom of Dunfermline in 1905 and awarded a knighthood in 1921.
- Andrew Scobie, the Architect who had been responsible for designing Carnegie’s first public swimming baths and was also noted for his designs for social housing.
- Alan Smith Tuke, a noted surgeon and local physician who pioneered the physical training and inspection of schoolchildren and set up the Dunfermline College of Hygiene and Physical Education.
- James Brown, who, aside from his wool dying business, was also one of the founders of the Fifeshire Property Investment and Building Society and an enthusiastic freemason, who went on to hold all principal offices in his lodge.
- George Mathewson and Robert Walker who helped to found the Dunfermline and West Fife hospital.
- William Robertson, who served for four years on the town council and was president of the Dunfermline Rotary Club.
- Andrew Shearer, a local linen manufacturer but better known for his military career in which he rose to lieutenant colonel in the Royal Highlanders.
- Henry Beveridge, another linen manufacturer who purchased of Pitreavie Castle in 1884.
- John Hynd, a working miner who had worked at Rosebank Colliery for most of his life and was also a keen horticulturalist and Secretary of the Dunfermline Horticultural Society.
- John Weir, who, aged just twenty-four, was appointed interim president of the Fife and Kinross Miners Union. He went on to become president of the Union in 1880 and was elected as a Scottish trade union representative to the federation of labour convention in 1900. He was a strenuous advocate of the minimum wage, a consistent supporter of the conciliation board and, in addition to his union work, was also a manager of the Dunfermline and West Fife hospital and served on the town council for eighteen years.

=== The Trust in popular culture ===
In 1908, the prolific music-hall song writing duo Ted Coleman and Frank Dupree released the words and music for a song entitled "I’m a Real Carnegie Hero". The song was satirical and the lyrics focus upon the work on a Police Inspector with the chorus being:

I’m a real Carnegie hero
With a nerve that’s always cool as zero
And a highly enlightened awe
For the majesty of the law
When I begin my official net to draw.
I follow clues without an error
And by crooks I’m called a holy terror
While the others are much impressed
By this medal upon my breast
For I’m real Carnegie hero

The Trust was not primarily intended to recognise the heroism of Police Officers and the introduction of the King’s Police and Fire Brigades Medal in 1909 largely catered for that. Despite this, in the period 1908-1914 the Trust made awards to 92 Police Officers which amounted to a little over 10% of all awards made in that period.

== Present day ==
The Carnegie Hero Fund Trust UK remains in operation and is based at a headquarters in Dunfermline, Scotland. It is a registered charity under Scottish law. It continues to make awards, as well as maintaining and updating its Roll of Honour. The Roll of Honour of the Carnegie Hero Fund Trust UK is an illuminated book that contains hand-inscribed entries relating to over 6,000 people whose heroism has been recognised since the foundation of the Trust in 1908. It is unique to the UK Hero Fund and is kept in the Andrew Carnegie Birthplace Museum. The opening pages of volume 1 are on permanent display in the Hero Fund Alcove and other pages can be viewed by prior arrangement.
