= Andrew Carnegie Birthplace Museum =

Coordinates: 56.0679°N 3.4612°W

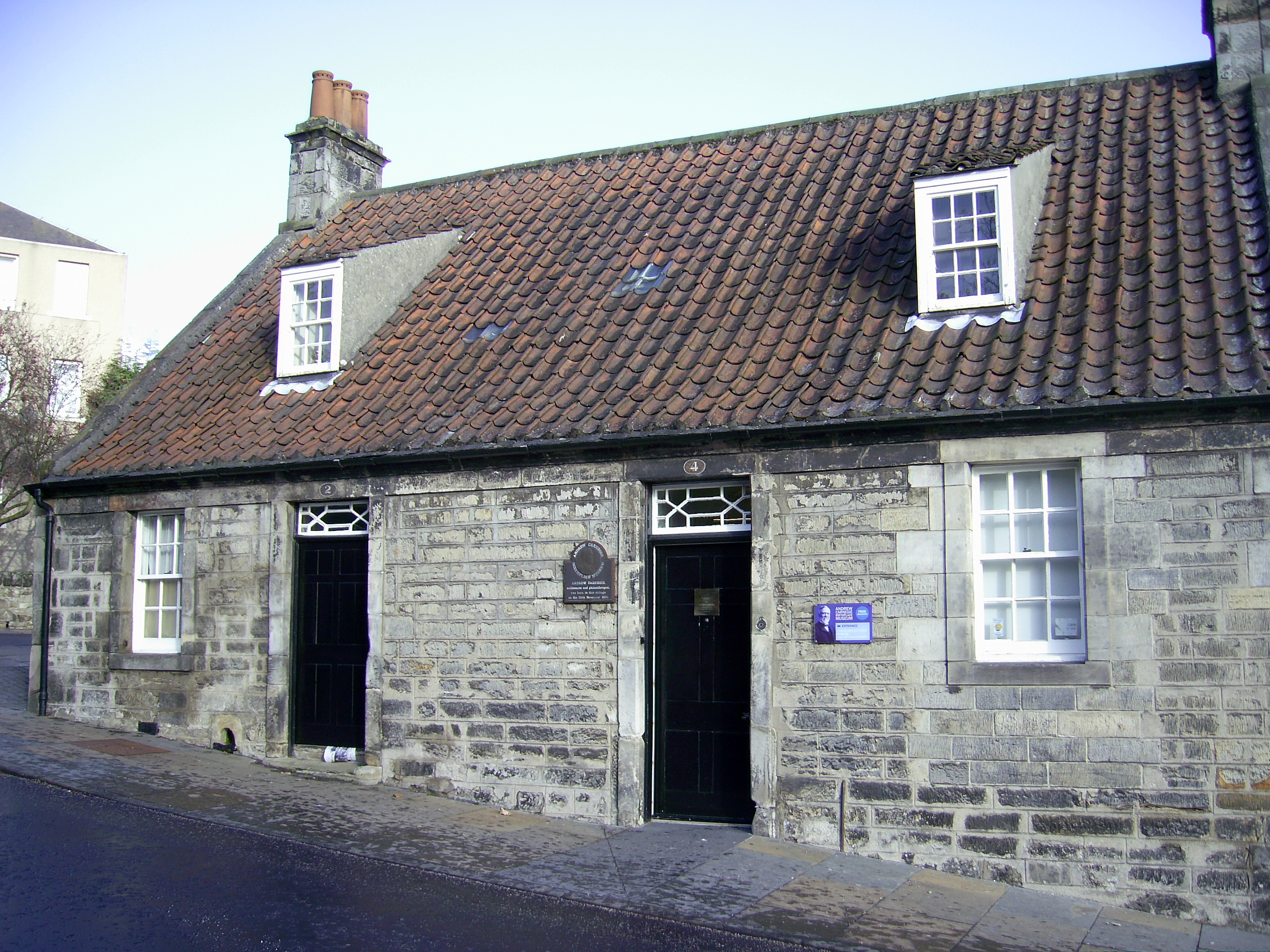
- Established: 1928
- Location: Dunfermline
- Type: Biographical Museum
- Founder: Louise Whitfield Carnegie
- Website: https://www.carnegiebirthplace.com/

The Andrew Carnegie Birthplace Museum is a biographical museum in Dunfermline, Fife, Scotland, dedicated to the life of Scottish-American industrialist and philanthropist Andrew Carnegie, "one of the great Scots of the 19th century.". The museum is operated by the Carnegie Dunfermline Trust and is housed in a category B listed building. The museum site includes the original 18th-century weavers cottage in which Andrew Carnegie was born and a memorial hall added by James Shearer in 1928.

Carnegie's wife, Louise Whitfield Carnegie, purchased the cottage in 1895 from William Templeman using a legacy bequeathed to her from her grandfather. Upon the creation of the Carnegie Dunfermline Trust in 1903 the cottage was looked after by the trust and opened to visitors in 1908.

== History ==
Andrew Carnegie was born in the cottage at 2 Moodie Street in 1835. William Carnegie, his father, was a weaver, using a hand loom to produce woven goods, but from 1840, hand looms were steadily replaced by large looms in factories, and weavers were expected to work there. The Carnegie family were advocates of liberalism, political activism and self-education, and this reputation meant that William struggled to find work within the factory system. Thus at the age of 13, Andrew left the cottage in 1848 to go with his family to make a new life in Allegheny, Pennsylvania, United States.

In October 2019 the museum became the first Scottish institution to win the Family Friendly Museum Award. The museum was one of fifteen selected from over 800 nominations to be placed on a shortlist, and won the award for small museums before becoming the overall winner of the 2019 award.

== Listed building ==
The listed building consists of numbers 2 and 4 Moodie Street and 5 Priory Lane. Carnegie was born in 2 Moodie Street, and because the cottage was bought in 1895 by Louise Carnegie, it remains largely in its original condition. The exterior of 4 Moodie Street has also been little altered, but internally, it was redesigned to become the entrance to the museum. The memorial building, added by the Scottish architect James Shearer between 1925 and 1928, is linked to the cottages by a single storey passage. It was constructed in 17th century Scottish baronial style with crowstepped gables, and the main hall includes clerestory dormers. This newer construction is listed in its own right, because of its stylistic interest, as are the boundary walls, which include scrolls and thistle motifs on decorative panels.

The cottages were originally built in the 1770s. Work began on the construction of the memorial building in 1925, and it was formally opened on 28 June 1928.

== Collections ==
The majority of the initial collection items of the museum were donated by Louise Whitfield Carnegie in 1928 and came directly from the Carnegie family homes in the US and Scotland. These included art, photographs and archival materials. Additional collection items, deemed too precious to donate when the museum was established, were bequeathed to the museum following the death of Louise Whitfield Carnegie. There are various kinds of exhibits being showcased relating to Natural History, the Arts and the Sciences. Some objects of note include portraits of the Carnegie family and Architectural Drawings of the Carnegie Institute in Pennsylvania.

The museum displays were extensively refurbished in 2008, and include details of Carnegie's industrial achievements in the United States, as well as some puppets from Sesame Street, a television programme that was launched with financial support from the Carnegie Corporation of New York.
