= Runswick Bay =

Village in North Yorkshire, England

Coordinates: 54.5345°N 0.7551°W

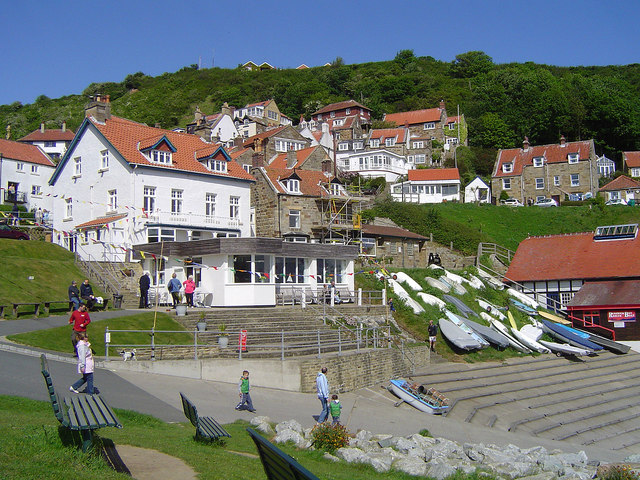
- Runswick Bay village

- Location within North Yorkshire
- OS grid reference: NZ82171599
- Civil parish: Hinderwell
- Unitary authority: North Yorkshire
- Ceremonial county: North Yorkshire
- Region: Yorkshire and the Humber
- Country: England
- Sovereign state: United Kingdom
- Post town: SALTBURN-BY-THE-SEA
- Postcode district: TS13
- Police: North Yorkshire
- Fire: North Yorkshire
- Ambulance: Yorkshire
- UK Parliament: Scarborough and Whitby

Runswick Bay is a bay in North Yorkshire, England. It is also the name of a village located on the western edge of the bay (although the village is sometimes shortened to Runswick on UK road signs). It is 5 miles (8 km) north of Whitby, and close to the villages of Ellerby and Hinderwell.

Located within the North York Moors National Park, it is a popular tourist attraction, due to its picturesque cliffside village, stunning coastal walks, fossil hunting and Runswick Sands, a white sand beach. It is on the Cleveland Way national trail. Runswick Bay was chosen as Beach of the Year 2020 by the Sunday Times.

== History ==
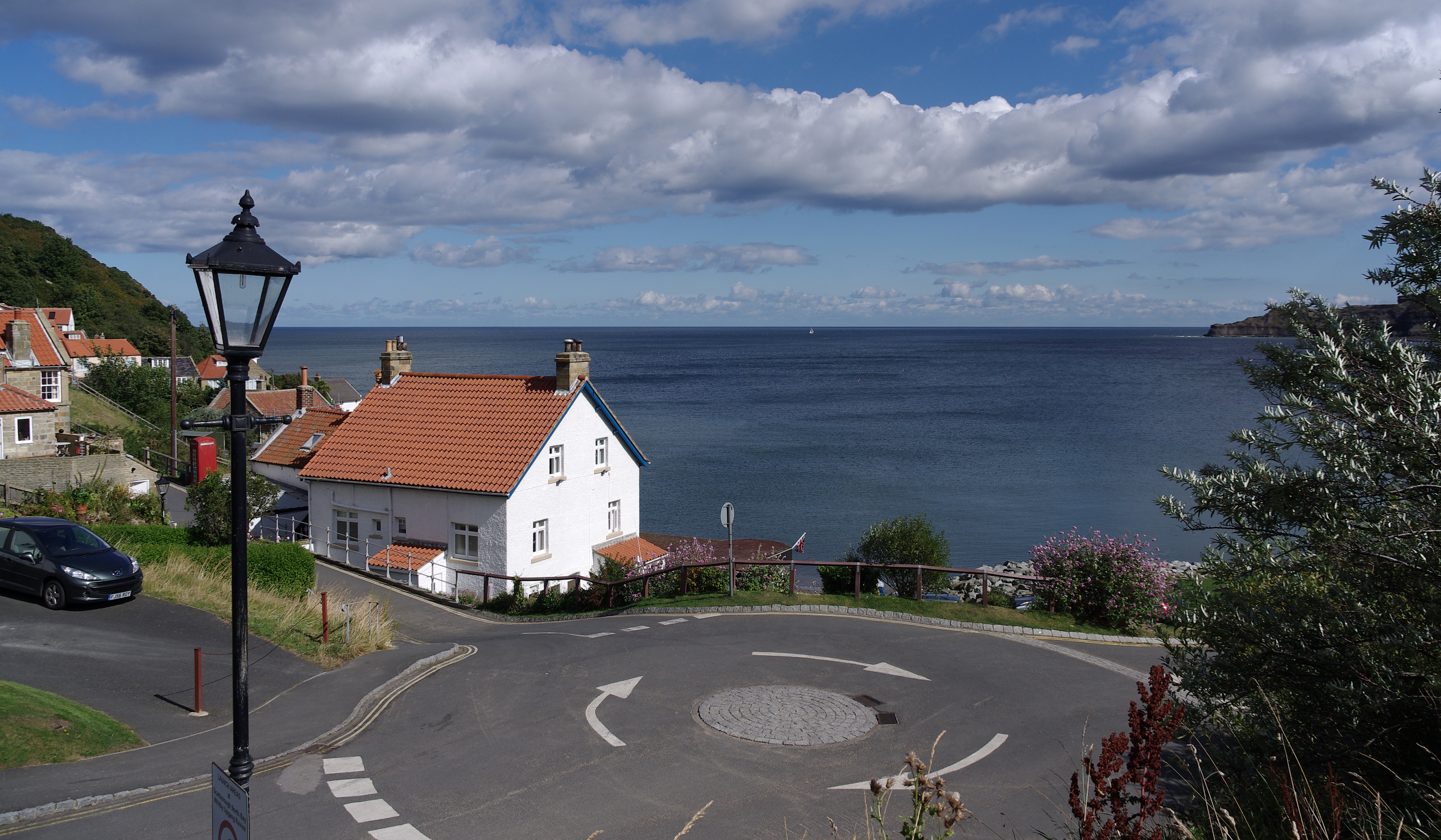
Runswick Bay

The original fishing village was almost completely destroyed by a landslide in 1682. Remarkably, there were no fatalities, as the village was alerted by two mourners at a wake. The village was rebuilt, slightly further to the south, perched on the side of cliffs.

The village ran its own lifeboat from 1866, until it was moved to the RNLI station at Staithes in 1978. The boathouse still remains, and has run its own volunteer rescue boat service since 1982.

In the late 1880s, Runswick Bay was the site of an art colony.

The Marquess of Normanby's Mulgrave Estate owns part of the land in the village which is also in the North Yorkshire Moors National Park.

The village is located within the Parish of Hinderwell, which at the 2011 census had a population of 1,875 people. From 1974 to 2023 it was part of the Borough of Scarborough. It is now administered by the unitary North Yorkshire Council.

== Geography ==
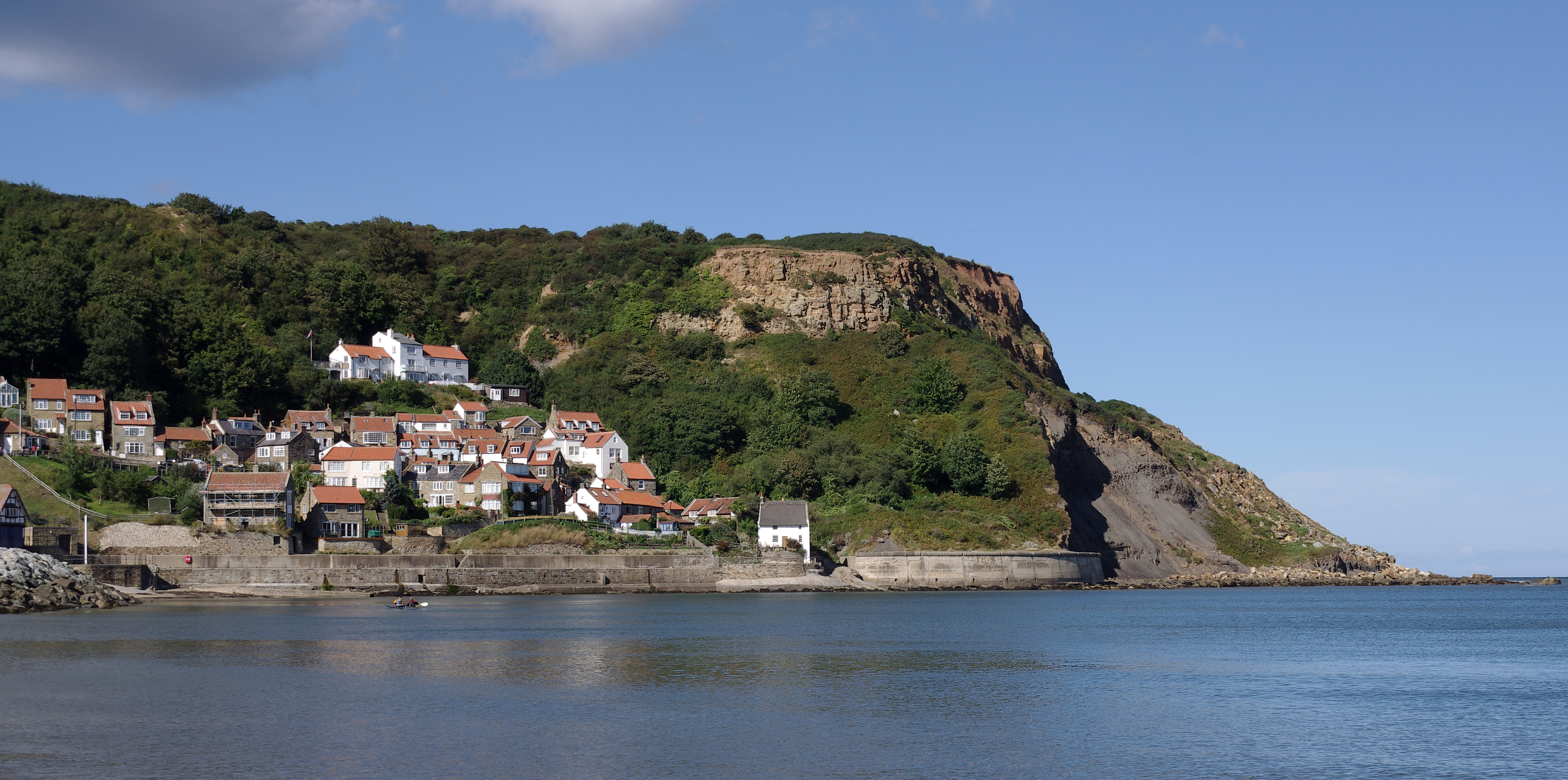
The cliffside village of Runswick Bay

On the north side of the bay is Cauldron Cliff, and the headland on the south side is known as Kettleness, site of alum mining from 1727 until the late 1800s.

Around the edge of the bay is a white sand beach called Runswick Sands, and a series of caves. The largest cave on the bay, Hob Hole, was so named as it was believed to be the home of a 'Hob' (or Boggart) in local folklore. The bay is 1.2 miles (2 km) long. A seawall, made of large boulders, was completed in 1970. Like other parts of the Yorkshire Coast, the area suffers from a high degree of coastal erosion, which has made it a popular location for fossil hunting.

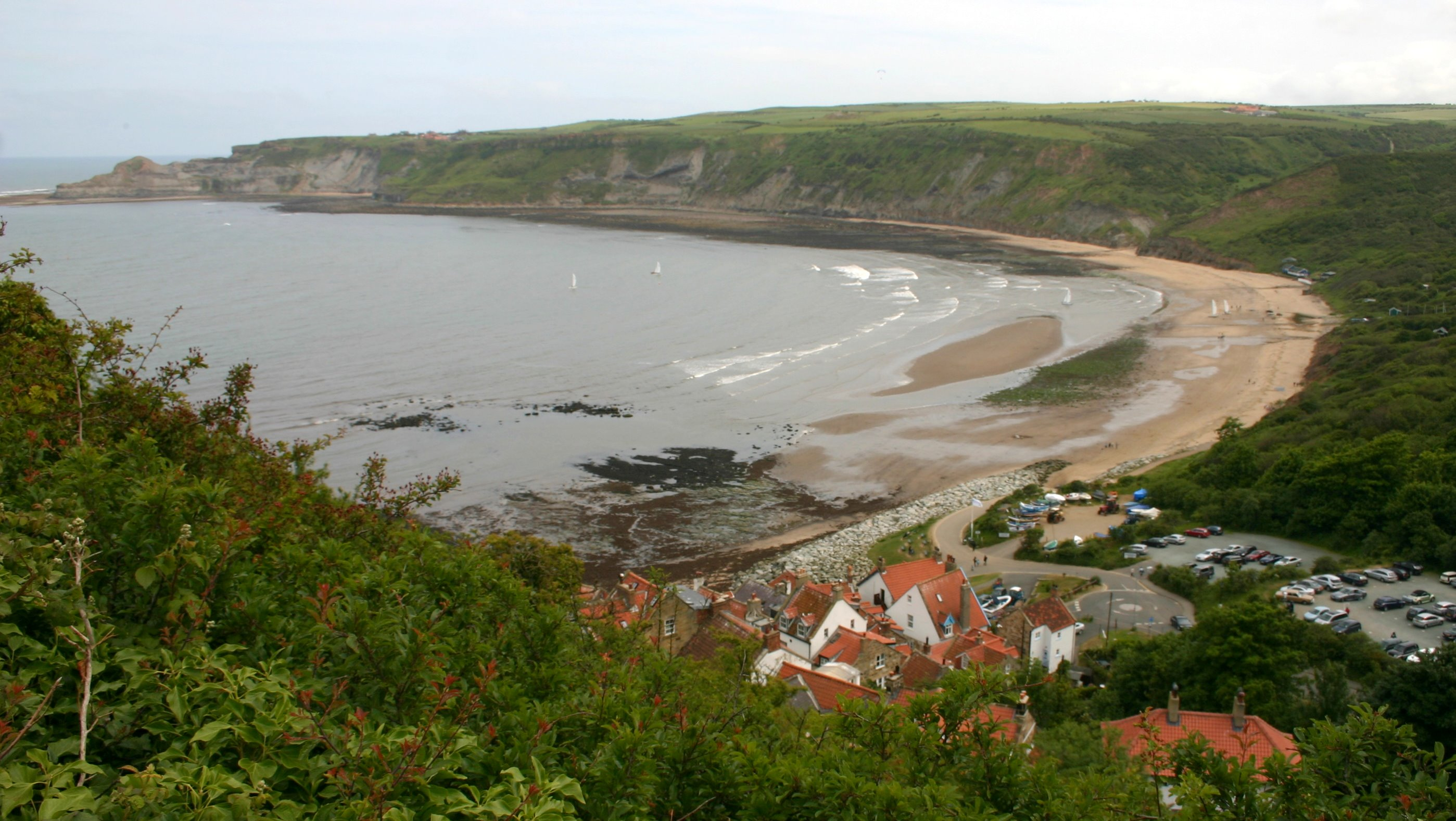
Looking across Runswick Bay toward Kettleness

A number of local streams drain into the bay across Runswick Sands: from west to east: Nettle Dale, Dunsley Dale, Calais Beck and Widgeytoft Gill.

Runswick Bay village covers an area of 620 hectares and has a peak seasonal population of 2,315, though permanent residence is low with a high degree of houses being holiday lets and second homes. It is split into two parts, the 'lower' red-roofed, cliff-side, former-fishing village, and Runswick Bank Top, a hamlet located adjacent to farmland overlooking the bay, built around the intersection of the roads leading to Ellerby and Hinderwell. The Bank Top village contains a camping and caravan site, a hotel and modern housing developments. The two parts of the village are joined via a steep lane which is part of the Cleveland Way, with the beach located at the bottom of the lane.

The Lower village of Runswick Bay is densely packed with narrow winding streets and steep steps. It is largely inaccessible to traffic, accessed only by a 1 in 4 gradient road. Key buildings include the old lifeboat station, and a thatched cottage which is a Grade II Listed building. There is a sailing club, a pub, one car park, holiday cottages to rent, public toilets and a beachside cafe. There are no disabled facilities and due to the uneven slopes access can be difficult

A £2.28 million pound award-winning coastal erosion protection scheme was completed in 2018 to protect the village for another 100 years.

== See also ==
- Listed buildings in Hinderwell
