= Torquay Lifeboat Station =

Former RNLI lifeboat station in Devon, England

- Flag of the RNLI

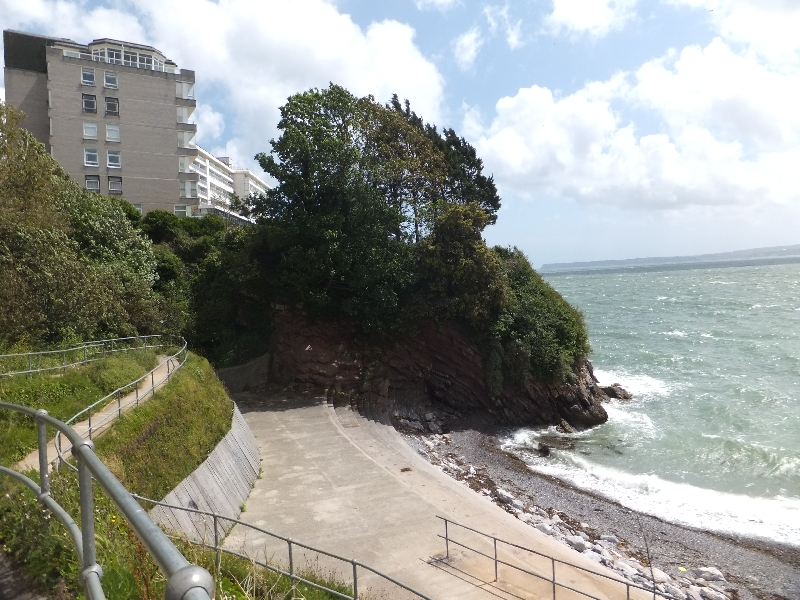
- Beacon Cove, Torquay in 2012

- Location within Devon

General information
- Type: Lifeboat station
- Location: Beacon Cove, Torquay, England
- Coordinates: 50.4576°N 3.5231°W
- Opened: 1876
- Closed: 1923
- Demolished: 1975

Torquay Lifeboat Station operated from Beacon Cove, also known as the 'Ladies Bathing Cove', just off Beacon Terrace in Torquay, a seaside resort approximately 22 miles (35 km) south of Exeter, on the north shore of Tor Bay, on the south-east coast of Devon, England.

The lifeboat station was established at Beacon Cove, Torquay, in 1876, by the Royal National Lifeboat Institution (RNLI).

The station was active from 1876 until 1923. A second private lifeboat was operational from 1917 until 1928.

== History ==
The RNLI had stationed a lifeboat on the southern shore of Tor Bay at Brixham in 1866. In September 1875, a public meeting was convened by local residents in Torquay, and a resolution passed, to petition the RNLI for the provision of a lifeboat in the town, on the northern shores of Tor Bay.

With regard to the petition, and a report by Capt. John R. Ward, RN, Inspector of Lifeboats to the Institution, following his visit to the town, at a meeting of the RNLI committee of management on Thursday 7 October 1875, the establishment of a new station was agreed. "..a Life-boat stationed there was likely to be as useful at Torquay as at Brixham, where one is already to be found; and that Torbay, which was some- times a rendezvous for a large amount of shipping, and the shores of which were in several parts inaccessible to a Life-boat on the land side, should be provided with such a boat on each side of its entrance."

A boathouse was built at the only practical location for construction and launching, the "Ladies Bathing Cove", a site granted by Sir Lawrence Palk, Bt, MP for East Devon. A 10-foot-long (3.0 m) Peake-class self-righting 'Pulling and Sailing (P&S) lifeboat, one with both sails and oars, was conveyed to Torquay by rail, arriving on 22 May 1876. A carriage was also provided, as the boat would then be available to be transported across the Thatcher headland to Babbacombe Bay, if required.

On 24 May 1876, the lifeboat was drawn on its carriage from the railway station to the harbour in grand procession, accompanied by music bands, members of benevolent societies, coastguard, and lifeboat crew. The lifeboat was funded by Mrs Brundret of Withington via the Manchester branch of the Institution, and following a short service by Archdeacon Alfred Earle, the donor named the lifeboat Mary Brundrett. The lifeboat was then launched into the harbour, meeting with the lifeboats from Brixham and Teignmouth, before being capsized by crane for demonstration purposes.

The Torquay lifeboat was launched into a raging storm on the morning of 14 October 1881, to the aid of the fishing smack Black Cat of Paignton. The boat was caught by its own gear, and on arrival on scene, it was found that the two crew had been in that position for 17 hours. The gear was cut free, and a tow established, to bring the boat and crew to Brixham Harbour. However, on the return journey from Brixham to Torquay, a distance of 3.9 nautical miles (7.2 km; 4.5 mi), at the height of the gale, the lifeboat capsized. Fortunately, the boat quickly self-righted, the crew regained the boat, and all returned safely to Torquay.

Mary Brundrett was withdrawn from service in 1889, having been launched 11 times, and saved 19 lives. On Friday 15 November 1889, over 2000 people gathered at the Inner Harbour at Torquay to witness the inauguration of a new larger 37 ft (11 m) lifeboat. The new boat employed twin sliding keels, and three water-tanks, for improved stability when required.

The 12-oared boat, built by Watkins of Blackwall, London, cost £564, funded by an anonymous lady from Manchester. After a short service, conducted by the Rev. Basil Reginald Airy, vicar of St. John's, assisted by Rev. Henry William Majendie, vicar of All Saints, the lifeboat handed to the care of the local branch of the Institution, and named James and Eliza Woodall (ON 269). With a bottle of wine broken on the bow, the lifeboat was launched on demonstration, to the sound of the Post Office Fife and drum corps.

The James and Eliza Woodall remained on service for the next 13 years, but was only launched three times, and saved no lives. Her replacement in 1902 was a 38 ft (12 m) non-self-righting Watson-class P&S lifeboat, Wighton (ON 487), but despite being on station for a further 21 years, this boat recorded just 11 launches, and no lives saved.

Brixham Lifeboat Station was equipped with a motor-powered lifeboat in 1922, which could cover a larger sea area in more extreme conditions. Changes in the shape of the beach at the Ladies Bathing Cove were also making it difficult to launch the lifeboat, and on 31 March 1923, Torquay Lifeboat Station was closed.

The boathouse was used as a café for many years, but was ultimately demolished in 1975.

== Torquay Harbour Lifesaving Boat ==
Maybe forseeing the demise of the Torquay lifeboat, the managing director of local shipping company 'Whiteways and Ball' presented one of their own boats to the RNLI in 1917, the Torquay Harbour Lifesaving Boat, on the understanding that it would be kept operational, even if the lifeboat station at the Ladies Bathing Cove was to closed. For the first year, it was kept on davits on Beacon Quay, but from 1918, it was kept afloat in the harbour. Only one service is recorded, launched with four lifeboat men on 7 January 1919, to the assistance of the schooner Skell of Hull. Very little is recorded about the boat. It was never given an official number, and it didn't really meet the usual RNLI specifications. There is no record of an official Torquay Harbour Lifeboat Station, and it is not clear who would have operated the boat after the closure of Torquay lifeboat station in 1923. The boat was withdrawn from service in 1928.

== Station honours ==
The following are awards made at Torquay:

- Special Letter of Thanks and Aneroid Barometer
  S. H. Easterbrook – 1916
- Letter of Thanks of the Institution
  Oliver Toms, Acting Coxswain – 1920

== Description ==
The boathouse was built in a decorative style at the back of the Ladies Bathing Cove under the cliff. Above the double opening doors was a bay window that give views of operations. On the long side of the building nearest the sea was a large shelter with three dormer windows above.

== Torquay lifeboats ==
=== RNLI ===
On station	ON (Note: ON is the RNLI's Official Number of the boat.)	Name	Built	Class	Comments
1876–1889	Pre-605	Mary Brundrett	1876	33-foot Peake Self-righting (P&S)	(Note: 33 ft 0 in (10.06 m) x 8 ft 6 in (2.59 m) (10-oared) Peake-class self-righting (P&S) lifeboat, gift of Mrs Brundrett of Withington, Lancashire, built by Woolfe of Shadwell, London, costing £397.); Sold in 1889.
1889–1902	269	James and Eliza Woodall	1889	37-foot Self-righting (P&S)	(Note: 37 ft 0 in (11.28 m) x 8 ft 0 in (2.44 m) (12-oared) self-righting (P&S) lifeboat, gift of an anonymous lady, via Mrs O'Connel of Manchester, built by Watkins of Blackwall, London, costing £564.); Sold in 1902.
1902–1923	487	Wighton	1902	38-foot Watson (P&S)	(Note: 38 ft 0 in (11.58 m) x 9 ft 4 in (2.84 m) (12-oared) Watson-class non-self-righting (P&S) lifeboat, legacy of Mrs M. H. Wighton of Hornsey, built by Thames Ironworks of Blackwall, London, costing £926.); Sold in 1923. Renamed Cavalla, last reported derelict at Wilburton, Cambridgeshire, February 2019.

Pre ON numbers are unofficial numbers used by the Lifeboat Enthusiasts' Society to reference early lifeboats not included on the official RNLI list.

=== Torquay Harbour Lifesaving Boat ===
On station	Name	Built	Class	Comments
1917–1928	Torquay Harbour Lifesaving Boat	–	20-foot 9in ship's boat	(Note: 20 ft 9 in (6.32 m) x 6 ft 0 in (1.83 m) non-self-righting ships boat, built and gifted by Whiteway and Ball of Torquay.); Kept at the harbour from 1918.

== See also ==
- List of RNLI stations
- List of former RNLI stations
- Royal National Lifeboat Institution lifeboats
