= Torbay Lifeboat Station =

RNLI Lifeboat station in Devon, England

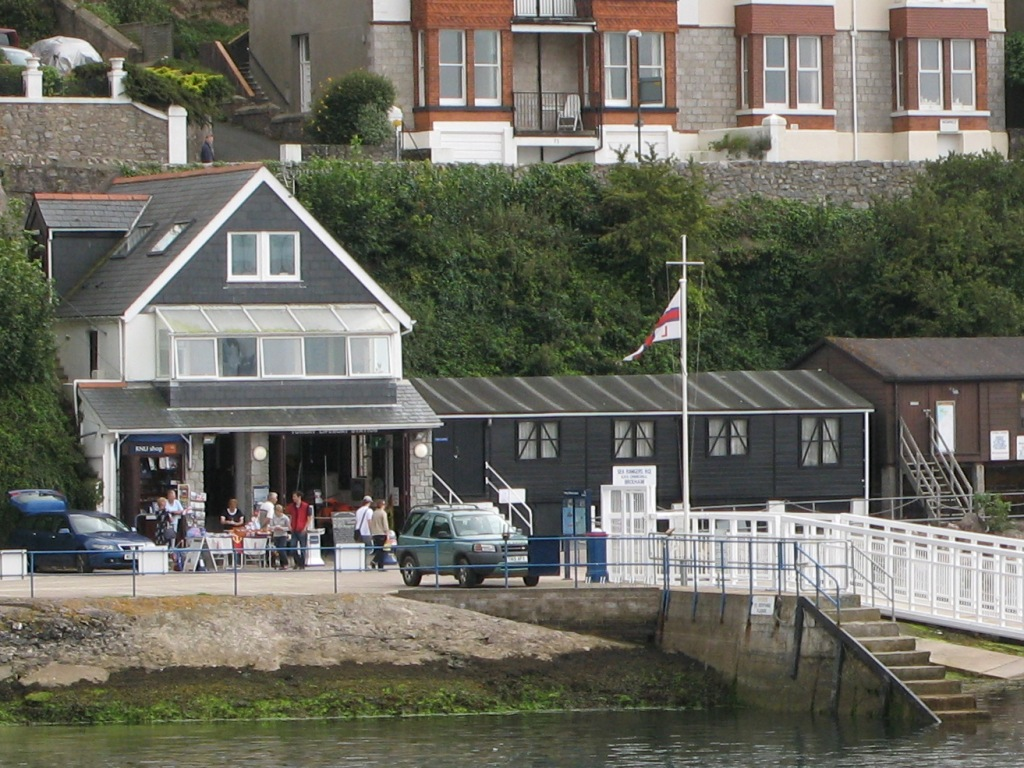
- Torbay Lifeboat Station

- Location within Devon
- Former names: Brixham; Brixham and Paignton

General information
- Type: Lifeboat station
- Location: Berry Head Road, Brixham, Devon, TQ5 9AF, England
- Coordinates: 50.399156°N 3.505492°W
- Opened: 1866
- Owner: Royal National Lifeboat Institution

Website
- Torbay RNLI Lifeboat Station

Torbay Lifeboat Station can be found on Berry Head Road in Brixham, a fishing port on the south shore of Tor Bay, approximately 30 miles (48 km) due east of Plymouth, on the south-east coast of Devon, England.

A lifeboat station was established at Brixham in 1866 by the Royal National Lifeboat Institution (RNLI), and was known as Brixham Lifeboat Station. Since 1924, the station has been Torbay Lifeboat Station.

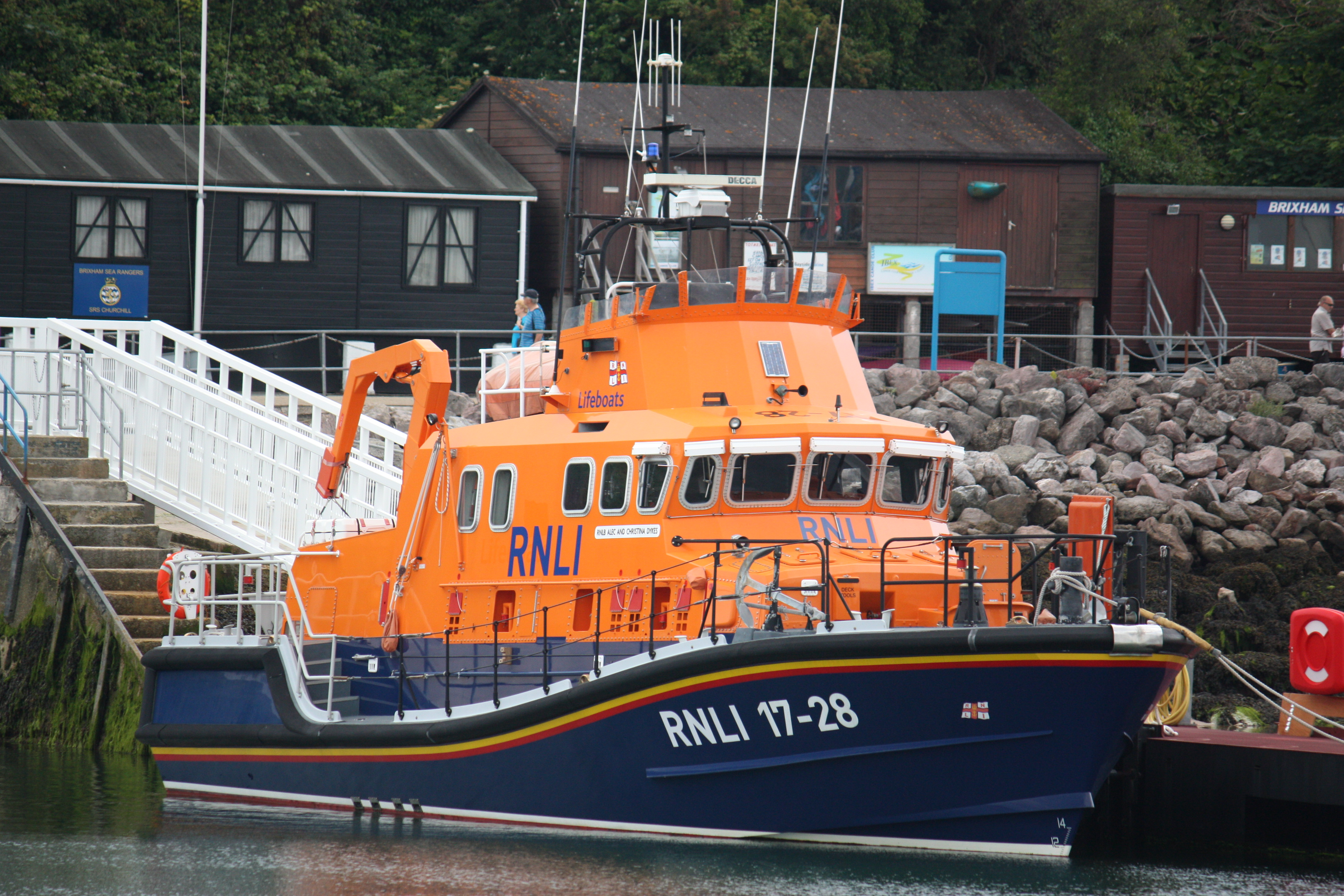
Severn-class All-weather lifeboat 17-28 Alec and Christina Dykes (ON 1255)

The station currently operates a Severn-class All-weather lifeboat (ALB), 17-28 Alec and Christina Dykes (ON 1255), on station since 2001, and a much smaller D-class (IB1) inshore lifeboat (ILB), Leslie & Mary Daws (D-788), on station since 2015.

== History ==
During the evening of 10 January 1866, a severe storm blew up and at least 74 vessels sought refuge again in Tor Bay and in the harbours at Brixham and Torquay. Tor Bay is sheltered from three sides, but at midnight, the wind changed direction to the exposed east side, and increased in strength to a full hurricane. Anchor chains parted, and many ships smashed into each other, or were driven ashore. At least 40 ships were wrecked and 73 people were lost. Coastguard and other helpers worked tirelessly to effect rescues. Fisherman Christopher Bartlett was let down a cliff on a line to one vessel, managing to save the lives of the whole crew bar one. The following day, the Teignmouth lifeboat China was brought by road to Torquay. Launching at 14:00, eleven men from two ships were rescued.

On 22 January 1866, a letter was sent to the RNLI from the Receiver of Wrecks for Torbay, requesting that a lifeboat be placed at Brixham. No time was lost, and the report of the visit to Brixham on 29 January by the Inspector of Lifeboats, Capt John Ward, RN, was read and approved at a meeting of the RNLI committee of management on Thursday 1 February.

The monies of the Exeter Lifeboat Fund, raised through the efforts of Thomas Brandreth Gibbs, and Mr W. Brodie, were appropriated to the establishment of the new lifeboat station at Brixham. A 34-foot-long (10 m) self-righting 'Pulling and Sailing' (P&S) lifeboat, one with sails and 10 oars, was constructed by Woolfe of Shadwell, London, and first transported to Exeter. On 1 October 1866, the lifeboat was drawn on its carriage by eight horses, through the city in grand procession, to the banks of the River Exe. There it was named City of Exeter by the mayoress, before being launched into the river on demonstration, testing the self-righting capabilities to a crowd of some 20,000 people. The lifeboat was then conveyed to Brixham, where it was launched for the first time on 10 November. The lifeboat had been transported from London to its destinations free of charge by the London and South Western and South Devon Railway Companies.

Initial plans for a site for a boathouse had to be revised, when difficulties arose with the Admiralty, and on arrival, the boat was stored under a tarpaulin. A boathouse was later constructed at Bolton Cross, at a cost of £175.

In 1873 a new boathouse and slipway was built near the breakwater so that the boat could be launched straight into the harbour. The old boathouse was used as a fire station for many years but was demolished and the site used for a new post office.

Following a petition from local residents, a second lifeboat station, Torquay Lifeboat Station, was opened on the north shore of Tor Bay in 1876, at Beacon Cove in Torquay.

The third lifeboat to be placed at Brixham, was one of five lifeboats funded from the estate of the late Mr E. A. Newbon of Islington, and was named Betsey Newbon (ON 361). The 38 ft (12 m) lifeboat arrived on station on 5 February 1894. However, the lifeboat was much disliked by the crew, and after being launched just twice, with no lives saved, the boat was replaced on 4 December 1896, by a 37 ft (11 m) lifeboat, again taking the name Betsey Newbon (ON 395). No records of any issues have been found, but it can be assumed there may have been fundamental flaws with the boat, as unusually, it wasn't transferred to another station, but broken up after being withdrawn, at just three years old.

In 1917, Brixham Lifeboat Station was renamed as Brixham and Paignton Lifeboat Station.

Five years later in 1922, the 'pulling and sailing' (P&S) lifeboat Betsey Newbon (ON 395) was replaced by a new motor lifeboat, Alfred and Clara Heath (ON 672), costing £8,302. With its single 45-hp Tylor engine, it could quickly cover a larger area, and operate in more severe weather. This effectively rendered the remaining P&S lifeboat at Torquay obsolete, and the station at Beacon Cove was closed the following year. In 1924, Brixham and Paignton lifeboat station was renamed again, this time as Torbay Lifeboat Station.

A larger 51 ft (16 m) Barnett-class motor lifeboat, George Shee (ON 734), was sent to Torbay in September 1930. This was too large to be kept in the boathouse, so it was moored in the harbour near the slipway. The boathouse was retained as a workshop but during World War II, part of it was dismantled, to make it easier for the Royal Navy to reach a new large slipway which was built over the old lifeboat slipway. The RNLI built a small pier in 1950 for the boarding boat that was used to ferry crews out to the lifeboat.

== 1960s onwards ==
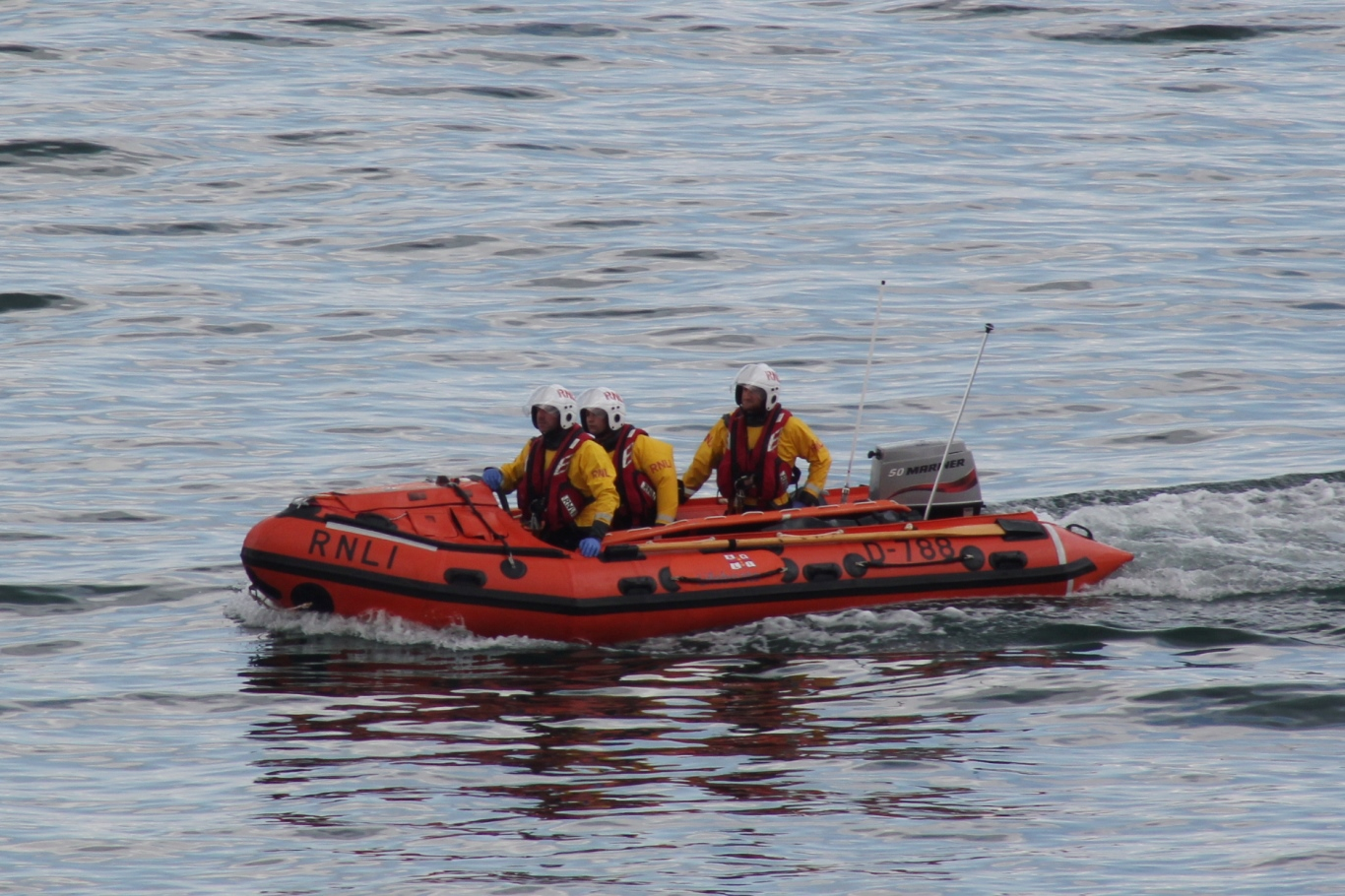
D-class (IB1) Inshore lifeboat Leslie & Mary Daws (2015)

A D-class (RFD PB16) Inshore lifeboat was sent to Torbay for the summer of 1964. It proved a useful addition to the station and so became a permanent feature. Until 1970, the ILB was an inflatable Inshore Rescue Boat, but between 1970 and 1987, the station operated a rigid hull A-class lifeboat, moored in the harbour. Since January 1987, a modern D Class has been Torbay's ILB. A portable building was provided as a temporary boathouse for the ILB but in 1990 work was undertaken on the boathouse to house the ILB and improve the crew facilities. Further improvements were made in 2007, and in 2008 a new pontoon was provided for the All-weather lifeboat (ALB).

The lifeboat station was granted the Honorary Freedom of the Borough of Torbay on 29 April 1988.

== Area of operation ==
The RNLI aims to reach any casualty up to 50 miles (80 km) from its stations, and within two hours in good weather. To do this the Severn class lifeboat at Torbay has an operating range of 250 nautical miles (460 km) and a top speed of 25 knots (46 km/h). Adjacent all-weather lifeboats are at Exmouth Lifeboat Station to the north, and Salcombe Lifeboat Station to the south. ILBs are also stationed at Teignmouth to the north and Dart to the south.

== Service Awards ==
=== William Mogridge ===
William Mogridge was coxswain of the Torbay Lifeboat from October 1932 until January 1942. During this time he was awarded four medals by the RNLI and one from the French government for leading rescues in difficult conditions.

On the evening of 30 December 1935, he took the Lifeboat Gorge Shee through a gale to help the Satanicle, a French trawler 15 nautical miles (28 km; 17 mi) east of Start Point. News of the trawler's problems were received at the station after a radio message from the Black Hawk, an American steamer, was picked up in Paignton. H. M. Smardon, the station's secretary, arranged for the coastguard to send a message back to the Black Hawk, asking them to use their searchlight to guide the lifeboat to the trawler. When the lifeboat arrived at the scene it found two other vessels standing by trying to give aid, but they had been unable to get a tow line across to the trawler. The crew was taken off with difficulty, the lifeboat being damaged when it was washed against the trawler, and they landed in Brixham early the next morning. Mogridge was awarded the RNLI Bronze Medal and Smardon received a letter of appreciation. The French government also awarded Mogridge a silver medal (first-class), Second Coxswain W. Pillar was given a silver medal (second-class) and bronze medals went to the other six members of the crew.

On 23 January 1937, the SS English Trader ran aground on the Checkstone Ledge near the mouth of the River Dart. The lifeboat sailed from Brixham at 05:25 that morning and stood by while tugs tried to pull the casualty off the shore. The lifeboat was refuelled at Kingswear, but at 06:00 on the morning of 24 January, the captain of the stricken vessel asked the lifeboat to take the crew off. During this time a strong gale had blown up and 14 ft (4.3 m) waves were now breaking right over the beached ship. Mogridge brought the lifeboat under the stern and alongside to take off the ship's 32 crew and also 20 people from the tugs who had gone aboard to help. He then reversed the lifeboat out to safety. After landing the rescued men at Dartmouth the lifeboat returned to Brixham, reaching its mooring at 12:15, nearly 31 hours after casting off. The RNLI awarded Mogridge a second-service clasp to go with his earlier bronze medal.

Mogridge took the lifeboat to sea in the afternoon of 9 December 1938, to the aid the Channel Pride, an inshore fishing boat that had lost power whilst returning to Dartmouth after a gale blew up. They had dropped anchor but it did not hold and they were blown towards the 200 ft (61 m) high cliffs. Waves were breaking 50 feet (15 m) up the cliffs because to the force of the storm. The lifeboat found the small boat with the help of a fire lit on the cliff top. It came right alongside and the two fishermen jumped on board, by which time the storm had blown the boats within 6 yd (5.5 m) of the cliffs. Mogridge was subsequently awarded an RNLI Silver Medal for his tremendous courage and outstanding seamanship on this occasion.

Another gale was blowing in Torbay on 16 December 1939 and the schooner Henrietta ran aground off Dartmouth. When Mogridge and his crew arrived they found the sailing ship rolling heavily. He managed to come alongside and it took just three minutes for the seven crew members to be brought on board the lifeboat. The boat rolled over onto the lifeboat and caused a 12 ft (3.7 m) gash along her side. Mogridge was awarded a second-service clasp for the silver medal he had won a year earlier. Bronze medals were given to William Pillar, his deputy, Richard Harris, the mechanic, and Frederick Sanders, the lifeboat's bowman.

=== Other service awards ===
In total, Torbay Lifeboat Station crew have been awarded 26 RNLI medals for gallantry, one gold, six silver and 19 Bronze, the last in 2008. These are some of the most notable examples.

On New Year's Day 1915, the Torbay Lifeboat's second coxswain, William Pillar was out fishing in his Brixham Fishing Smack Provident BM291, when he and his crew (First Hand William Carter, Second Hand John Clarke, Apprentice Daniel Taylor, né Ferguson) went to the aid of HMS Formidable which had been torpedoed and sunk by German U-boat U-24, saving the lives of 71 men after a difficult rescue in darkness and high seas. For this outstanding gallantry they were each awarded the Albert Medal by His Majesty King George V.

In the early hours of 17 December 1944 the George Shee put to sea after two vessels were reported aground between Paignton and Torquay. The tug Empire Alfred was 50 yards (46 m) from the shore but the waves were breaking 400 yards (370 m) from the beach so the lifeboat could only approach with extreme caution. It took half an hour to get the 14 crew off the tug, during which time the lifeboat often touched the bottom. They then turned to the second boat, Yard Craft 345 but ran aground before reaching it. The lifeboat forced itself free in reverse. After landing the people rescued from the tug at Brixham, they returned for another attempt. Many lifeboats struggled to find full crews during World War II and on this occasion the Torbay crew was two short, so the Assistant Mechanic had to join the crew on deck while the Motor Mechanic Richard Harris operated both engines on his own, sometimes waist deep in water. The five people on the craft were taken on board the lifeboat and back to Brixham. Harris was awarded an RNLI bronze medal, and coxswain Frederick Sanders received his second silver medal.

Harry Thomas was coxswain from February 1951 until October 1960. Within a year of his appointment had been awarded a bronze medal. It was on the evening of 30 January 1952 that he took the lifeboat out into a severe gale to search for the source of a white flashing light in Torbay. After searching for an hour and a half the army tug Trieste which had lost power with eleven men on board. After some difficulty in getting alongside the drifting tug they were all rescued although several of them were suffering from extreme seasickness. Thomas received a silver medal for a rescue on 7 December 1959 when a 120-foot (37 m) long unpowered barge loaded with large steel pipes was cast adrift from its tug. The one man and a dog were rescued, but a second man was swept off a rope and drowned. Also recognised for his work that night was Richard Harris who was awarded another bronze medal.

The MV Northwind was dragging her anchor in Torbay in a severe gale and heavy seas on the morning of 22 December 1964. By the time the Princess Alexandra of Kent had reached her she was aground between Paignton and Torquay. Although all the crew were taken off to the shore by Her Majesty's Coastguard, at one point it looked as though this would not be possible, and the lifeboat crew worked hard in difficult conditions to get alongside the stricken vessel. This work saw Richard Harris receive his fourth bronze medal, and coxswain Harold a silver medal.

The 18 feet (5.5 m) wooden ILB put to sea on 5 October 1973 in response to a report of a woman in the water during a storm. Motor Mechanic Barry Pike spotted her and dived into the water while Coxswain Kenneth Gibbs used his skill to prevent the lifeboat crushing the two people in the water. Pike was washed ashore but returned and eventually brought the woman ashore, although she was found to be dead. He was awarded a silver medal for his courage and determination and also the Ralph Glister Award for the most meritorious service of the year by a member of the crew of an inshore lifeboat. Gibbs received his own bronze medal for his tremendous courage and excellent seamanship during a rescue that he led in the All-weather lifeboat on 16 December that year. On that occasion a sole crewman of the fishing boat Petit Michel was saved 38 miles (61 km) out at sea in a Force 9 storm.

1976 was another year of outstanding rescues by the lifeboat crews at Torbay. On 23 August the lifeboat went to rescue 14 people and a dog who had been cast ashore when their speedboat was wrecked south of Dartmouth. Lifeboatman John Dew was awarded a bronze medal for swimming ashore with a line so that lifejackets could be transferred ashore and the survivors brought off the beach. During the course of an hour he had to swim out to the lifeboat seven times. Then on 6 December the lifeboat was called to the aid of the MV Lyrma after its steering gear had failed in a Force 10 storm. On this occasion it was under the command of Second Coxswain Keith Bower. The casualty was trying to face into the wind by using its engines alone. The storm was causing it to rise 30 feet (9.1 m) on the waves; an attempt to remove the crew via helicopter failed. The lifeboat had to avoid being crushed under the ship – at one point the larger ship smashed the guard rails that prevent the lifeboat crew being washed overboard when on deck. Despite this they eventually managed to get eight of the casualty's crew on board and picked up the two people who had managed to board a life raft. For this outstanding seamanship and tremendous courage a gold medal was awarded to Keith Bower, and bronze medals were given to Mechanic Steven Bower (his brother), Assistant Mechanic William Hunkin, and crew members Michael Mills, Nicholas Davies, Richard Brown and John Dew (his second medal in a year).

Two years later saw two more medal rescues at Torbay. Firstly, on 19 February 1978 when the pilot boat Leslie H found itself unable to steer in a Force 9 storm. Two men were taken off and the pilot boat towed back towards Brixham, but a 35 feet (11 m) wave knocked the Edward Bridges right over so that her propellers and keel were out of the water. Her self-righting design proved itself and she was soon back upright, but lifeboatman John Ashford was missing. The lifeboat's coxswain, John Dyer, flicked the tow line across to the man overboard and he caught it and was pulled back on board. The captain was later taken off the pilot boat and the tow abandoned. For his courage, seamanship and leadership, Dyer was awarded a bronze medal. On 2 December Arthur Curnow, who had only been appointed coxswain three weeks earlier, took the lifeboat out in the early morning to the trawler Fairway which had broken down. Six people were rescued in a tricky operation in heavy seas. The new coxswain was awarded a bronze medal for this work.

On 13 January 2008 20 people were saved from the MV Ice Prince – eight by the lifeboat and 12 by a Coastguard helicopter. They were operating in Force 9 winds and the stricken vessel was leaning at 45˚; the lifeboat had to approach it about 50 times to save those lives. Coxswain Mark Criddle received a silver medal in recognition of his courage, skill and determination.

== Station honours ==
The following are awards made at Torbay:

- Albert Medal for Lifesaving, awarded by H.M. King George V
  William Pillar, Master – 1915
  William Carter, First Hand – 1915
  John Clarke, Second Hand – 1915
  Daniel Taylor, Apprentice – 1915
  Master and crew of the Fishing Smack Provident of Brixham
- RNLI Gold Medal
  Keith William Bower, Acting Coxswain – 1977
- RNLI Silver Medal
  William Harry Hayward Mogridge, Coxswain – 1939
  William Harry Hayward Mogridge, Coxswain – 1940 (Second-Service clasp)
  Frederick Collier Sanders, Coxswain – 1945
  Henry Owen Thomas, Coxswain – 1960
  Harold Coyde, Coxswain – 1965
  Barry Pike, Motor Mechanic – 1974
  Mark Criddle, Coxswain – 2008
- Silver Medal, awarded by The French Government
  William Harry Hayward Mogridge, Coxswain – 1936
  William Pillar, Second Coxswain – 1936
- Silver Medal of Humane Assistance, awarded by The Queen of the Netherlands
  Henry Owen Thomas, Coxswain – 1959
- The Emile Robin Award from The Marine Society
  for the most outstanding sea rescue
  Mark Criddle, Coxswain – 2008
- The James Michael Bower Endowment Fund award
  Mark Criddle, Coxswain – 2008
- RNLI Bronze Medal
  William Harry Hayward Mogridge, Coxswain – 1936
  William Harry Hayward Mogridge, Coxswain – 1937 (Second-Service clasp)
  William Pillar, Second Coxswain – 1940
  Richard Trewaves Harris, Mechanic – 1940
  Frederick Collier Sanders, Bowman – 1940
  Richard Trewaves Harris, Mechanic – 1945 (Second-Service clasp)
  Henry Owen Thomas, Coxswain – 1952
  Richard Trewaves Harris, Motor Mechanic – 1960 (Third-Service clasp)
  Richard Trewaves Harris, Motor Mechanic – 1965 (Fourth-Service clasp)
  Kenneth Gibbs, Coxswain – 1974
  John Dew, crew member – 1976
  John Dew, crew member – 1977 (Second-Service clasp)
  Stephen James Bower, Mechanic – 1977
  William John Hunkin, Assistant Mechanic – 1977
  Michael Mills, crew member – 1977
  Nicholas Davies, crew member – 1977
  Richard Brown, crew member – 1977
  George Edward Dyer, Coxswain – 1978
  Arthur Curnow, Coxswain – 1979
- Medal Service Certificate
  Each of the Torbay lifeboat crew – 1978
- Bronze Medals, awarded by The French Government
  Frederick Collier Sanders, Bowman – 1936
  Frederick J. Welch, Motor Mechanic – 1936
  A. E. Babb, Asst. Mechanic – 1936
  H. P. Soper, crew member – 1936
  G. Mogridge, crew member – 1936
  F. R. Tucker, crew member – 1936
- Bronze Medal of the Humane Assistance, awarded by The Queen of the Netherlands
  Each of the crew members – 1959
- The Ralph Glister Award 1974
  (for the most meritorious service of the year performed by a rescue boat crew)
  Barry Pike, Motor Mechanic – 1974
- The Thanks of the Institution inscribed on Vellum
  Rev Robert Elrington, Honorary Secretary – 1889
  Frederick Collier Sanders, messenger – 1921
  William Sanders, Coxswain – 1923
  William Pillar, Second Coxswain – 1936
  Frederick. Collier Sanders, Bowman – 1936
  Frederick J. Welch, Motor Mechanic – 1936
  A. E. Babb, Asst. Mechanic – 1936
  H. P. Soper, crew member – 1936
  G. Mogridge, crew member – 1936
  F. R. Tucker, crew member – 1936
  William Pillar, Second Coxswain – 1937
  Frederick Collier Sanders, Bowman – 1937
  Frederick J. Welch, Motor Mechanic – 1937
  Edwin Lamswood, Asst. Mechanic – 1937
  John Glanville, crew member – 1937
  G. Mogridge, crew member – 1937
  Frederick R. Tucker, crew member – 1937
  William Pillar, Second Coxswain – 1939
  Frederick Collier Sanders, Bowman – 1939
  Richard Harris, Motor Mechanic – 1939
  Edwin Lamswood, Asst. Mechanic – 1939
  C. Bickford, crew member – 1939
  F. Lamswood, crew member – 1939
  Frederick R. Tucker, crew member – 1939
  Edwin Lamswood, Asst. Mechanic – 1940
  A. Disney, crew member – 1940
  W. Rogers, crew member – 1940
  W. Coleman, crew member – 1940
  E. Cronin, crew member – 1940
  Samuel Glanville, Bowman – 1945
  Henry Thomas, Asst. Mechanic – 1945
  Harold Soper, crew member – 1945
  Abraham Bartlett, crew member – 1945
  David Thomas, Asst. Mechanic – 1952
  A. Bartlett, Second Coxswain – 1960
  John Fry, Bowman – 1960
  James W. Harris, Asst. mechanic – 1960
  D. W. O. Thomas, crew member – 1960
  K. H. Thomas, crew member – 1960
  P. V. Easton, crew member – 1960
  John Stone, Second Coxswain – 1965
  Albert Janssens, Bowman – 1965
  Owen MacInally, Asst. Mechanic – 1965
  Anthony Rae, crew member – 1965
  George Dyer, crew member – 1965
  Martin Payne, crew member – 1965
  Ernest Cudd, crew member – 1965
  Alistair MacKay, crew member – 1965
  Francis Janssens, crew member – 1965
  Kenneth Gibbs, (Coxswain), Helm – 1974
  Arthur Curnow, Coxswain – 1990
  Nigel Crang, Helm – 1999
  Simon James, crew member – 1999
  Roger Good, Second Coxswain – 2008
  John Ashford, Deputy Second Coxswain – 2008
  Mathew Tyler, Mechanic – 2008
  Nigel Coulton, Second Mechanic – 2008
  Darryll Farley, crew member – 2008
  Dr Alexander Rowe, crew member – 2008
  Capt. Kevin Balls and the crew of coastguard rescue helicopter India Juliet – 2008
  Nigel Crang, Helm – 2011
- A Framed Letter of Thanks signed by the Chairman of the Institution
  Arthur Curnow, Coxswain – 1979
  Brian Caunter, Acting Assistant Mechanic – 1979
  Michael Kingston, crew member – 1979
  Nigel Crang, crew member – 1995
  David Hurford, Coxswain – 1998
  Nick O’Brien, crew member – 1999
  John Heale, crew member – 2011
  Will Bower, crew member – 2011
  Mark Criddle, Coxswain – 2013
  Ryan Bradfield, crew member – 2013
- A Collective Letter of Thanks signed by the Chairman of the Institution
  David Hurford, Coxswain – 1992
  Richard Morphett, Second Coxswain – 1992
  Stephen Bower, Emergency Mechanic – 1992
  Dr Raymond Foster, crew member – 1992
  Cyril Yeoman, crew member – 1992
  Nigel Crang, crew member – 1992
  Ernest Fradd, crew member – 1992
- A Framed Letter of Thanks signed by the Chairman of the Institution
  Babbacombe Corinthian Sailing Club – 1937
- Letter of Appreciation (Thanks) from the Institution
  H. M. Smardon, Honorary Secretary – 1936
  H. M. Smardon, Honorary Secretary – 1937
- The Honorary Freedom of the Borough of Torbay
  Torbay Lifeboat Station – 1988
- Letter of Thanks from Italian Government – 1926
- Letter of Thanks from Netherlands Government – 1936
- Letter of Thanks from Belgian Marine Department – 1944
- The GMTV/Daily Mirror Pride of Britain award (Emergency Services)
  Coxswain Mark Criddle and his crew – 2008
- Officer, Order of the British Empire (OBE)
  Mark John Criddle, Coxswain – 2018
- Member, Order of the British Empire (MBE)
  Alderman Frederick William Henry Park, Honorary Secretary – 1968QBH
  David Ernest Ham – 2016QBH
  Lynn Patricia Spillett – 2022QBH
- British Empire Medal
  Arthur Laurence Vivian Curnow, lately Coxswain – 1992NYH
  Ian John Barnaby – 2024NYH

== Roll of honour ==
In memory of those lost whilst serving at Torbay:

- Suffered extreme exposure on service on 29 January 1940, and died in March 1940.
  Frederick R. Tucker, crew member (57)

== Torbay lifeboats ==
=== Pulling and sailing lifeboats ===
| On station | ON (Note: ON is the RNLI's Official Number of the boat.) | Name | Built | Class | Comments |
|---|---|---|---|---|---|
| 1866–1885 | Pre-477 | City of Exeter | 1866 | 34-foot Self-righting (P&S) | (Note: 34 ft 0 in (10.36 m) x 8 ft 6 in (2.59 m) (10-oared) self-righting (P&S) lifeboat, gift of the Exeter LB fund, via Mr T. B. Gibbs, built by Woolfe of Shadwell, London, costing £310.); Sold in 1885. |
| 1885–1893 | 43 | Brian Bates | 1884 | 37-foot Self-righting (P&S) | (Note: 37 ft 0 in (11.28 m) x 8 ft 0 in (2.44 m) (12-oared) self-righting (P&S) lifeboat, legacy of Mr B. Bates of London, built by Woolfe of Shadwell, London, costing £390.); Broken up in 1894. |
| 1894–1896 | 361 | Betsey Newbon | 1894 | 38-foot Self-righting (P&S) | (Note: 38 ft 0 in (11.58 m) x 8 ft 0 in (2.44 m) (12-oared) self-righting (P&S) lifeboat, legacy of Mr R. A. Newbon of Islington, built by Woolfe of Shadwell, London, costing £588.); Broken up in 1896. |
| 1896–1922 | 395 | Betsey Newbon | 1896 | 37-foot Self-righting (P&S) | (Note: 37 ft 0 in (11.28 m) x 9 ft 4 in (2.84 m) (12-oared) self-righting (P&S) lifeboat, legacy of Mr R. A. Newbon of Islington, built by Roberts of Mevagissey, costing £495.); Capsized in 1920. Sold in 1922. Renamed Zingari, reported wrecked at Llansteffan, March 2003. |

Pre ON numbers are unofficial numbers used by the Lifeboat Enthusiasts' Society to reference early lifeboats not included on the official RNLI list.

=== Motor lifeboats ===
| On station | ON | Op. No. (Note: Op. No. is the RNLI's Operational Number of the boat carried on the hull.) | Name | Built | Class | Comments |
|---|---|---|---|---|---|---|
| 1922–1930 | 672 | — | Alfred and Clara Heath | 1922 | 40-foot Self-righting (motor) | Moved to Salcombe Lifeboat Station and retired from Saint Peter Port in 1945. Sold in 1945. Renamed Mary & Katherine, later Moby Dick. Broken up in Gibraltar, August 2009. |
| 1930–1958 | 734 | — | George Shee | 1930 | 51-foot Barnett | Exported in 1959 for further use as a lifeboat in Guatemala. |
| 1958–1975 | 945 | — | Princess Alexandra of Kent | 1958 | 52-foot Barnett (Mk. II) | Transferred to the relief fleet, later at Tynemouth. Sold in 1984. Renamed Princess, Lost off Crail on passage to Peterhead, 1 August 2012. |
| 1975–1994 | 1037 | 54-03 | Edward Bridges (Civil Service No.37) | 1974 | Arun | On display since 1996 in the RNLI Heritage Collection at Chatham Historic Dockyard, December 2025. |
| 1994–1995 | 1086 | 52-25 | A.J.R. & L.G. Uridge | 1983 | Arun | Later stationed at Holyhead and briefly at Penlee. Sold in 2003 for further use as lifeboat PR Hebe at Kemi, Finland, until 2019. Now a workboat at Tallinn, Estonia, November 2025. |
| 1995–2001 | 1076 | 52-12 | Marie Winstone | 1981 | Arun | Previously at Fishguard. Sold in 2002. In use as lifeboat PR Torbay in Kaskinen, Finland, December 2023. |
| 2001– | 1255 | 17-28 | Alec and Christina Dykes | 2001 | Severn | |

More post-service details can be found on the respective lifeboat class pages.

=== Inshore lifeboats ===
| On station | Op. No. | Name | Class | Comments |
|---|---|---|---|---|
| 1964 | D-23 | Unnamed | D-class (RFD PB16) | |
| 1965 | D-21 | Unnamed | D-class (RFD PB16) | First stationed at Hastings in 1964. |
| 1966 | D-25 | Unnamed | D-class (RFD PB16) | First stationed at Southwold in 1964. |
| 1966–1967 | D-49 | Unnamed | D-class (RFD PB16) | First stationed at Tynemouth in 1965. |
| 1967–1969 | D-55 | Unnamed | D-class (RFD PB16) | First stationed at Newquay in 1965. |
| 1968 | D-33 | Unnamed | D-class (RFD PB16) | First stationed at Atlantic College in 1965. |
| 1970 | D-102 | Unnamed | D-class (RFD PB16) | First stationed at Moelfre in 1966. |
| 1970–1975 | 18-03 | Unnamed | A-class (Hatch) | First stationed at Poole in 1967. Later renumbered A-2. |
| 1975–1987 | A-512 | Unnamed | A-class (McLachlan) | Later stationed at Falmouth. |
| 1987–1988 | D-286 | Unnamed | D-class (RFD PB16) | Initially deployed as a relief lifeboat from 1982. |
| 1988–1996 | D-354 | Alfred George Martin | D-class (EA16) | |
| 1996–2005 | D-504 | Spirit of the RPC | D-class (EA16) | |
| 2005–2015 | D-651 | John William Hirst | D-class (IB1) | |
| 2015– | D-788 | Leslie & Mary Daws | D-class (IB1) | |

== See also ==
- List of RNLI stations
- List of former RNLI stations
- Royal National Lifeboat Institution lifeboats
