= Teignmouth Lighthouse =

Lighthouse in Devon, England

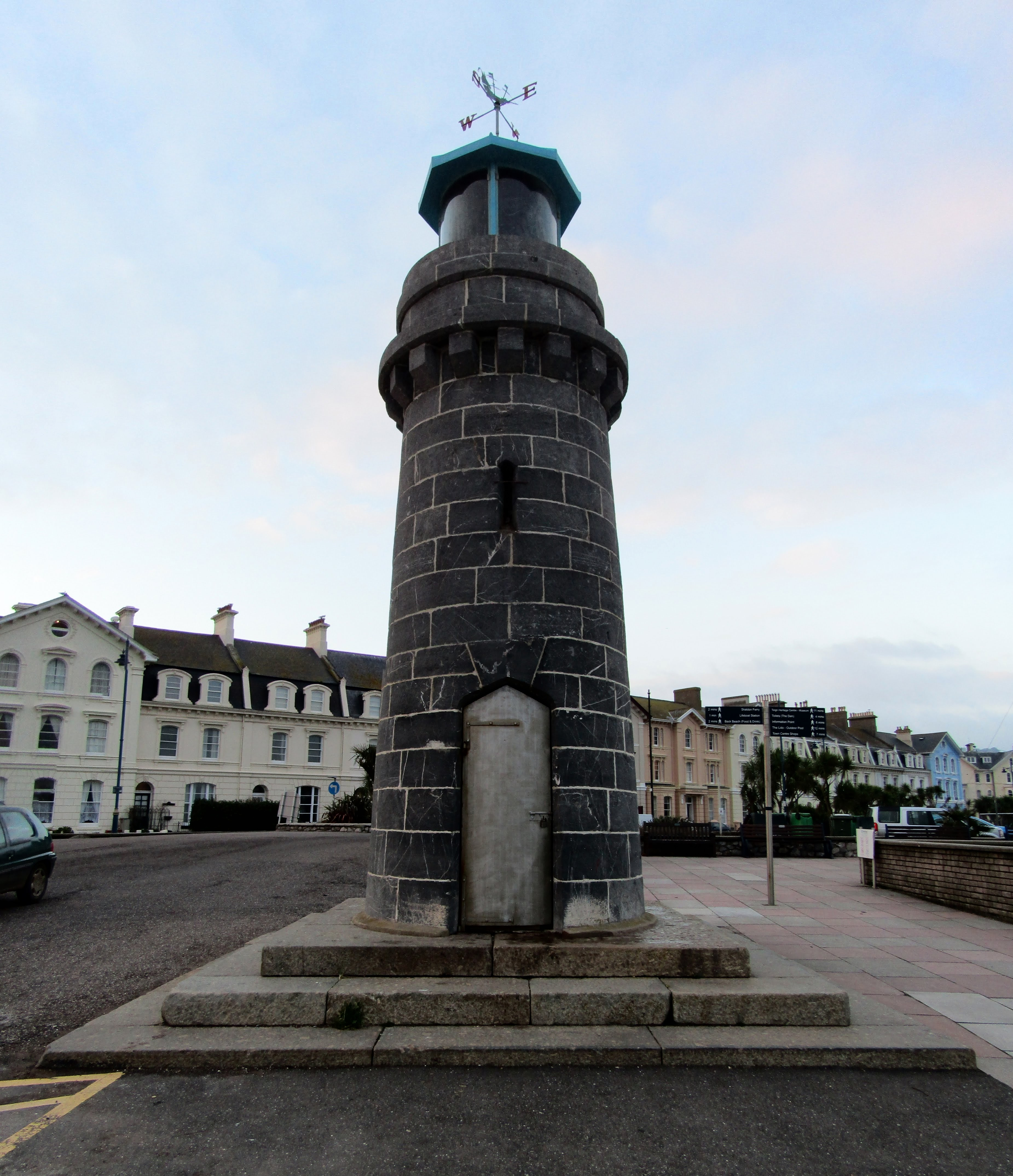
- View of the lighthouse looking inland
- Location: Teignmouth
- OS grid: SX9403572484
- Coordinates: 50.542474°N 3.496847°W

Tower
- Constructed: 1845
- Construction: Limestone
- Height: 6 m (20 ft)
- Shape: Cylindrical
- Operator: Teignmouth Harbour Commission
- Heritage: Grade II listed building

Light
- First lit: 1845
- Focal height: 10 m (33 ft)
- Range: 6 nmi (11 km; 6.9 mi)
- Characteristic: F R

Teignmouth lighthouse is a lighthouse situated on the south end of the Den promenade at Teignmouth, Devon, England. It is paired with a red polycarbonate leading light at Powderham Terrace behind the lighthouse. It has been a Grade II listed building since 1949.

== History ==
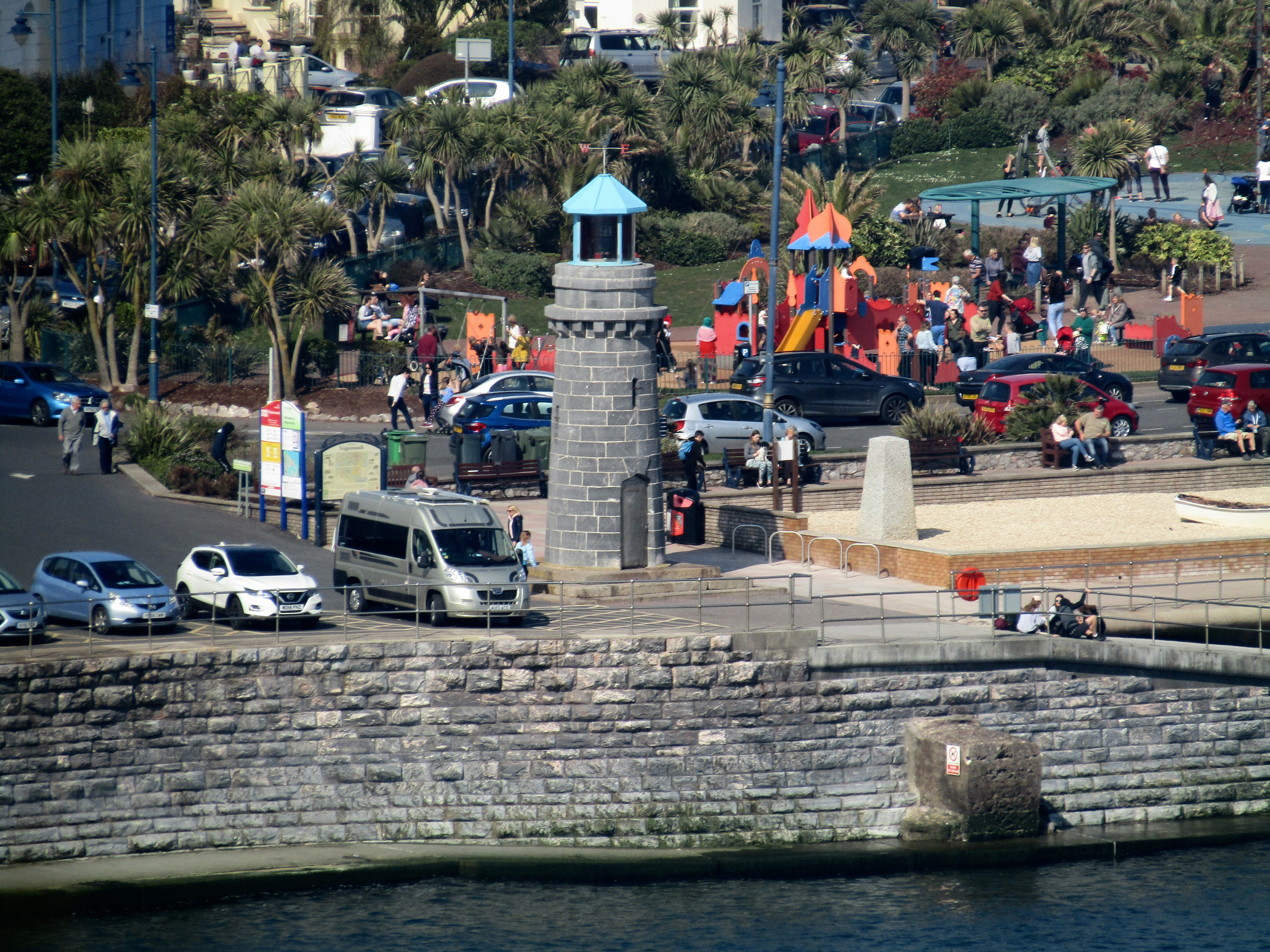
Teignmouth Lighthouse from Shaldon

The entrance to the River Teign has dangerous currents, rocks and shifting sands, posing a danger to vessels and thus was deemed to require a navigational aid. Under the Harbour Commissioners, planning for the lighthouse commenced in the early 1840s. The limestone lighthouse tower was built in 1844–1845 and came into service in 1845. It was lit by three gas burners, with reflectors, and showed a fixed red light (with a range of 7 nautical miles) to guide ships to the mouth of the harbour.

The lighthouse is currently maintained by the Harbour Master and continues to guide vessels through the channel's sand bars into the harbour.

== See also ==
- Teignmouth Lifeboat Station
