= Salcombe Lifeboat Station =

RNLI Lifeboat station in Devon, England

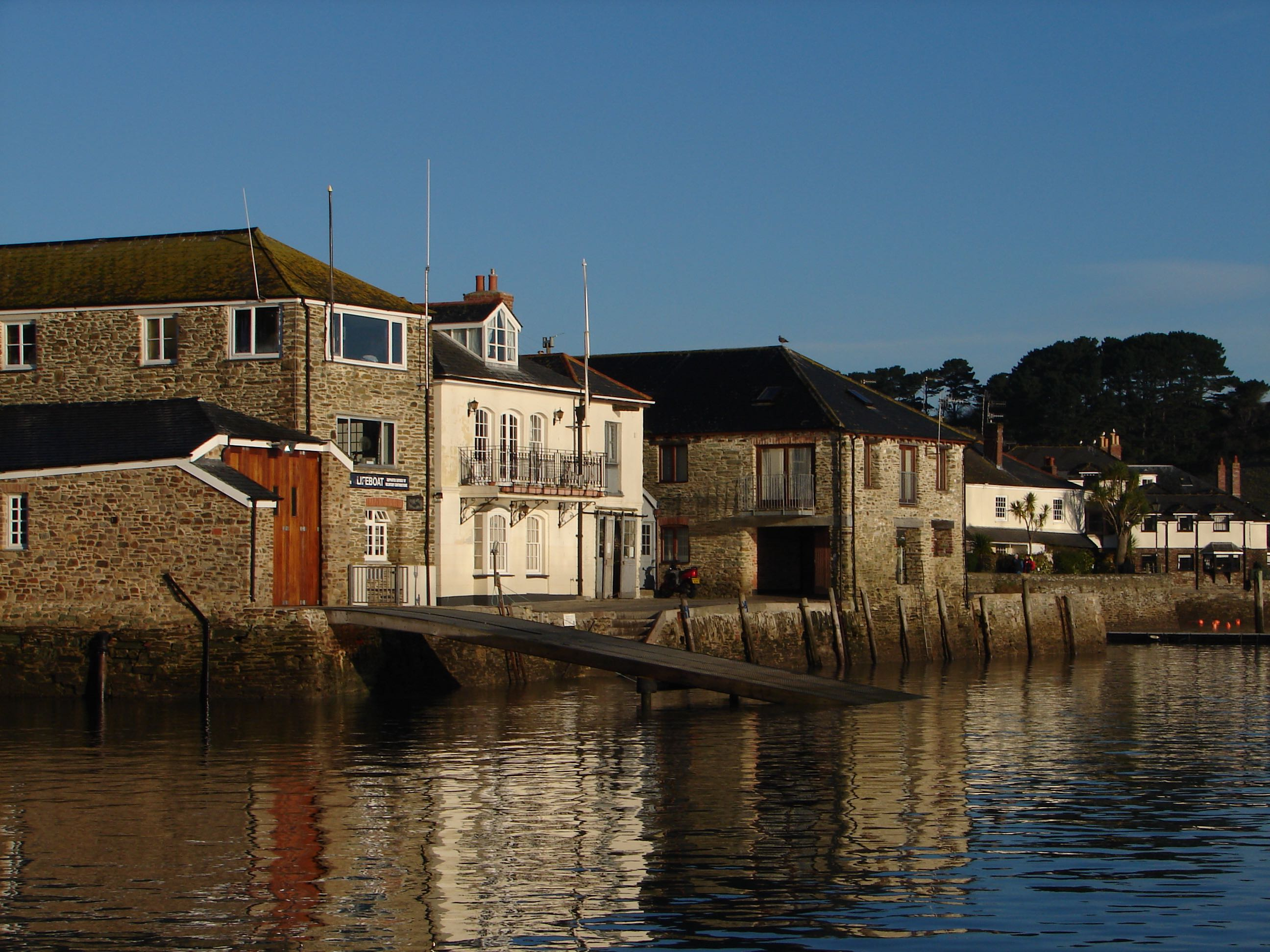
- Salcombe Lifeboat Station on Union Quay

- Location within Devon

General information
- Type: Lifeboat Station
- Location: Union Quay, Union Street,, Salcombe, Devon, TQ8 8BZ, England
- Coordinates: 50.2386°N 3.7668°W
- Opened: At South Sands 1869; Present station 1922
- Owner: Royal National Lifeboat Institution

Website
- Salcombe RNLI Lifeboat Station

Listed Building – Grade II
- Feature: Lifeboat house (South Sands)
- Designated: 27 February 1974
- Reference no.: 1289243

Salcombe Lifeboat Station can be found on Union Street in Salcombe, a town sitting to the west side of the mouth of the Kingsbridge Estuary on the South Hams peninsula, approximately 23 mi (37 km) south-east of Plymouth, on the south-east coast of Devon, England.

A lifeboat was stationed in Salcombe in 1869 by the Royal National Lifeboat Institution (RNLI). 13 crew were lost in 1916 when the lifeboat capsized.

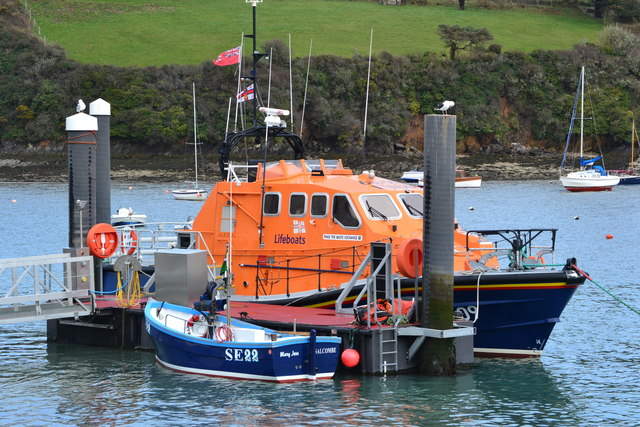
Tamar-class All-weather lifeboat (ALB), 16-09 The Baltic Exchange III (ON 1289)

The station currently operates a Tamar-class All-weather lifeboat (ALB), 16-09 The Baltic Exchange III (ON 1289), on station since 2008, and a B-class (Atlantic 85) Inshore lifeboat (ILB), Gladys Hilda Mustoe (B-905), on station since 2018.

== History ==
In a severe north-easterly gale on 23 March 1866, the barque Spirit of the Ocean was on passage from London to Halifax, Nova Scotia, when she was driven ashore and wrecked at Prawle Point, the southern most tip of Devon, just to the east of the Kingsbridge estuary. 38 of the 42 people on board were lost. The event was witnessed by tenant farmer Samuel Popplestone, who raised the alarm. Despite the conditions, he lowered himself down the cliff, and managed to pull the four survivors from the wreck. As a result of his heroism, a brand new award for civilian gallantry was established, and Samuel Popplestone became the very first recipient of the Albert Medal for Lifesaving, awarded in gold.

It is likely that the publicity around the events at Prawle Point in 1866 had some influence regarding a lifeboat for the area. The report of the Inspector of Lifeboats, Capt. John R. Ward, RN, following his visit to the town, was read at the meeting of the RNLI committee of management on Thursday 6 April 1868. It was resolved on his recommendation that a lifeboat station be established at Salcombe. The gift of £640 had been received from Richard Durant of Sharpham, Ashprington , near Totnes, via the Devon central branch of the Institution, to defray the cost of the establishment.

Sadly, before the lifeboat went on service, the tea Clipper Gossamer was wrecked at Prawle Point on 10 December 1868. A further 13 people were lost, including the Master, Capt. John Thomson and his bride of just two weeks, Barbara Kerr.

A new 33-foot-long (10 m) Peake-class self-righting 'Pulling and Sailing' (P&S) lifeboat, one with sails and (10) oars was constructed by Woolfe of Shadwell, London, at a cost of £283, and in September 1869, was transported with its carriage free of charge to Kingsbridge Railway Station, by the Bristol and Exeter and South Devon railway companies.

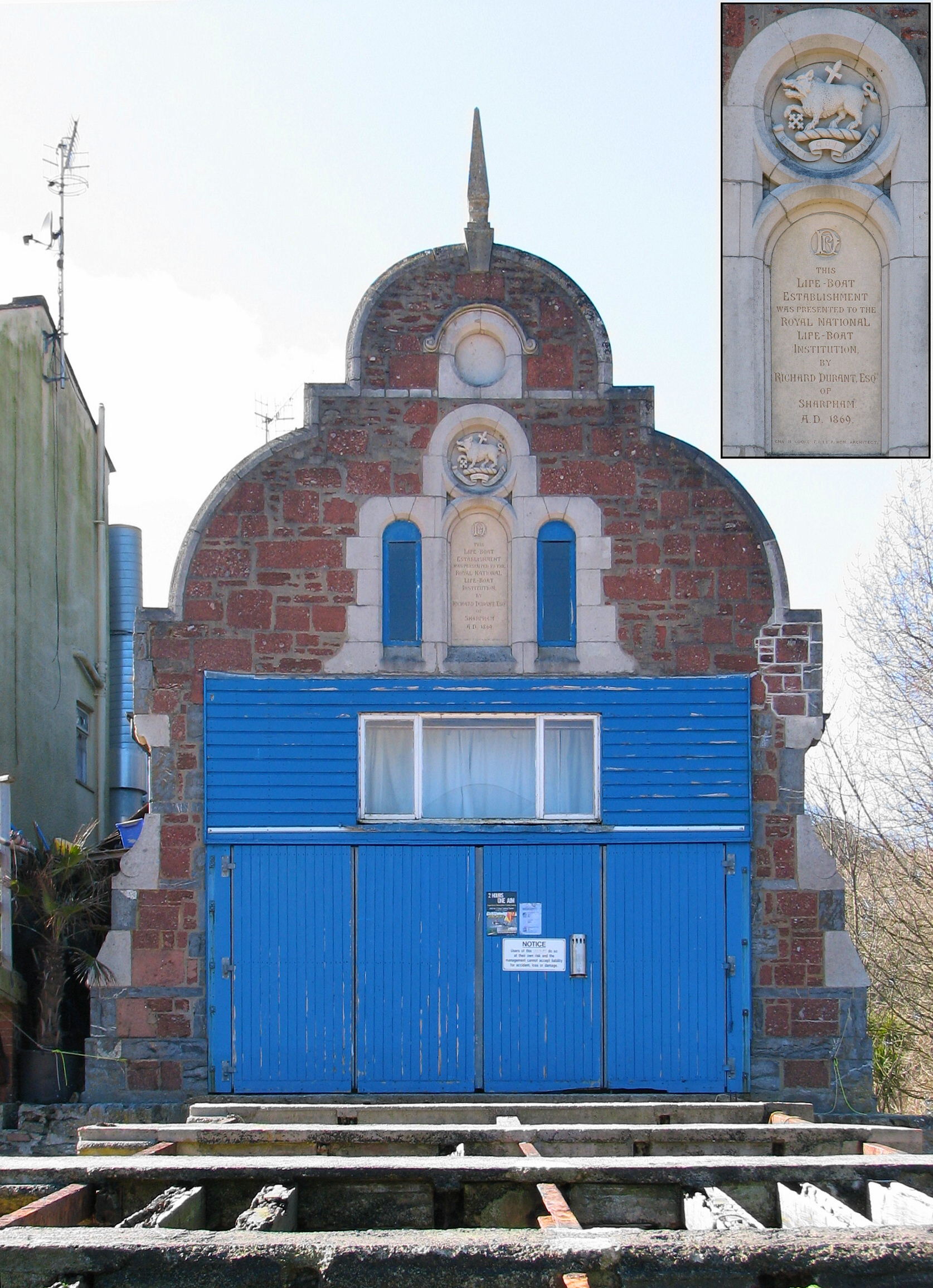
South Sands boathouse in 2009

On 21 September 1869, the lifeboat was drawn in grand procession, accompanied by civic dignitaries, members of benevolent societies, pilots, fishermen, schoolchildren and men of the lifeboat and coastguard, to the head of the harbour. There it was formally presented to the Institution by Richard Durant, and named Rescue in accordance with his wishes. The boat was then launched on demonstration to the assembled crowd, and capsized by crane, to prove its self-righting capabilities.

"Another life-boat establishment has also been organized by the Society on the Coast of Devonshire, at Salcombe, a port where there is some trade, and where there is a good supply of men to work the boat."

After the naming ceremony, the boat was rowed down the estuary to its new station at South Sands Beach, 1.5 miles (2.4 km) south of Salcombe. A new boathouse, costing £309-10s, had been constructed on a site granted by the The Earl of Devon, allowing easy access to the lower estuary, the Salcombe sand bar, and the open sea.

== Disaster ==
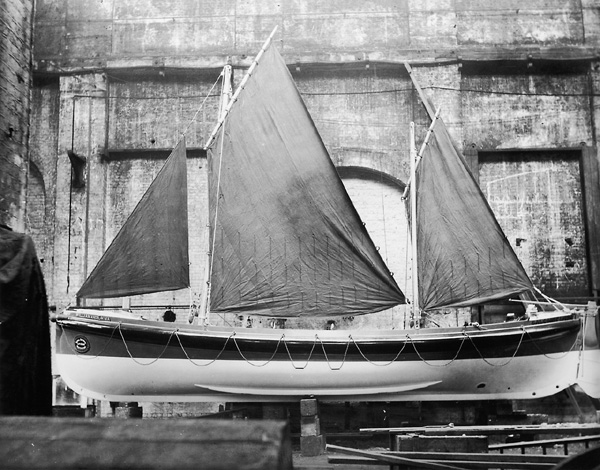
35-foot Liverpool-class lifeboat William and Emma (ON 524)

By 1904, the lifeboat on station was the non-self-righting 35-foot Liverpool-class lifeboat William and Emma (ON 524). The lifeboat was launched at 06:50 on 27 October 1916, to the aid of the schooner Western Lass of Plymouth, driven ashore and wrecked on Meg Rock, at Langerstone Point, 1/2 mi (0.80 km) east of Prawle Point. Unbeknown to the crew, the last man was rescued from the wreck by the coastguard rocket brigade at 06:52. After a hard row to the wreck, the lifeboat arrived to find everyone had been rescued.

The lifeboat turned for home, and approaching South Sands, the boat was made ready to cross the Bar, the sails were lowered, and a drogue was deployed to keep the boat straight. At this point, an enormous wave hits the boat, which was pitchpoled stern over bow. The whole crew were thrown into the water. Despite their best efforts to cling on, the battering waves finally forced them to lose their grip. Two of the crew, Edward 'Eddie' Distin and William 'Bill' Johnson are found alive, washed up on the shore, but 13 crew drowned. A father and two sons were lost, along with another two pairs of brothers. Eight women were widowed, and 19 children under the age of 18 lost their father.

The station was closed temporarily, until a new lifeboat could be placed on service. Speculation will always remain whether a self-righting lifeboat would have resulted in a better outcome. The station re-opened in April 1917, with a new crew, and the 35-foot self-righting lifeboat Sarah Ann Holden (ON 449).

== Closure and reopening ==
The neighbouring stations at Torbay and Plymouth were equipped with motor lifeboats in 1922 and 1926 respectively. With local lifeboat cover provided by the P&S lifeboat at Hope Cove just 6 miles (9.7 km) away, at a meeting of the RNLI committee of management on 17 September 1925, it was decided to close Salcombe Lifeboat Station. The Sarah Ann Holden (ON 449), which had been relocated to moorings nearer the town in 1922, was sold from service.

However, the decision was reconsidered in 1930, when the station at Hope Cove was closed. At the time, a motor-lifeboat from either Torbay or Plymouth, typically capable of 7 kn (13 km/h; 8.1 mph), and each over 20 nmi (37 km; 23 mi) away, would have taken about three hours to reach Salcombe. The lifeboat station was re-established at Salcombe, with crew facilities provided in the Unity building on the quay, and the 40-foot self-righting motor lifeboat, Alfred and Clara Heath (ON 672), with a single 45-hp Tylor petrol engine, was transferred from Torbay.

== Capsize No. 2 ==
The 47-foot Watson-class lifeboats were not inherently self-righting, but after the capsize of the Fraserburgh lifeboat in 1970, they were fitted with air bags, that would self-inflate, and bring the lifeboat upright in case of capsize. This was put to the test when the Salcombe 47-foot Watson-class lifeboat The Baltic Exchange (ON 964) was launched on 10 April 1983 into a force 9 gale, gusting force 11, to reports of two divers clinging to an upturned dinghy, and possibly two more missing. The lifeboat was hit by a series of massive waves, the first knocking the lifeboat over, with crew member Michael Hicks washed overboard. The second wave capsized the lifeboat, but the air-bag automatically inflated, bringing the lifeboat upright. The lifeboat was at full speed when capsized, and from the water, Hicks watched in disbelief as the lifeboat rolled a full 360°, and then continued away again at full speed.

The boat was soon circled back round, and Hicks was recovered to the boat, and although sustaining some damage, the boat was able to continue the search. However, with the Torbay Arun-class lifeboat Edward Bridges (Civil Service No. 37) summoned, the Salcombe boat was taken to calmer conditions to drain some of water in the engine room, and then taken to Brixham. The first two divers were recovered by helicopter, with the other two divers already having made shore in a second dinghy.

== 1988 onwards ==
The Baltic Exchange (ON 964) remained on service at Salcombe until 1988. The boat was replaced by a new Tyne-class lifeboat, powered by twin 425-hp 6V92TA Detroit Diesel engines, and costing £584,362. Again funded by the members of The Baltic Exchange, the new lifeboat was named 47-022 The Baltic Exchange II (ON 1130}.

In 2003, a B-class (Atlantic 75) Inshore lifeboat was additionally stationed at Salcombe. After a short period with a boat from the relief fleet, Joan Bate (B-794) served the station until 2018. A boathouse was built beside the existing crew facilities, along with a new slipways for the ILB, and a new pontoon for the moored lifeboat was provided in 2004.

After 22 years service, The Baltic Exchange II was sold from service in 2010, replaced by the £2.5 million Tamar-class All-weather lifeboat, 16-09 The Baltic Exchange III (ON 1289), driven by twin 1,015-hp Caterpillar Inc. C18 diesel engines, delivering a top speed of 25 kn (46 km/h; 29 mph).

Following a comprehensive coastal review, major changes were announced by the RNLI in 2025, which will see some lifeboats replaced and others reallocated. In 2027, Salcombe are scheduled to lose their Tamar-class lifeboat, to be re-allocated to a station requiring a larger and more modern boat, but will receive a brand new state-of-the-art Shannon-class All-weather lifeboat, costing in excess of £2.7 million.

In February 2026, it was announced that The Baltic Exchange are actively fundraising to finance the new lifeboat at Salcombe in 2027, which will carry the name The Baltic Exchange IV.

== Description ==
The main crew facilities are in a three-storey building on the waterfront of Union Street. Next door is a similarly constructed single-storey boathouse for the ILB with its own slipway.

== Area of operation ==
The RNLI aims to reach any casualty up to 50 miles (80 km) from its stations, and within two hours in good weather. To do this the Tamar class lifeboat at Salcombe has an operating range of 250 nautical miles (460 km) and a top speed of 25 knots (46 km/h). Adjacent lifeboats are at Plymouth to the west, and Torbay to the east; there is also an ILB at Dart Lifeboat Station in Dartmouth between Salcombe and Torbay.

== The Baltic Exchange ==
The Baltic Exchange (incorporated as The Baltic Exchange Limited]) is a British financial services company and membership organisation for the maritime industry. It provides freight market information.

It's charitable activities combine a number of maritime societies as an independent charity supporting largely maritime causes. The charity has so far funded three All-weather lifeboats for the RNLI at Salcombe, plus an additional B-class (Atlantic 85) Inshore lifeboat, David Bradley (B-882) at Lymington, in memory of former Baltic Exchange employee David Bradley. Funding has also been provided to the Sailors' Society, The Mission to Seafarers, National Coastwatch Institution, The Marine Society, and The Ahoy Centre.

== Service awards ==
On 7 December 1939, a few months after the start of World War II, the Samuel and Marie Parkhouse went to the aid of the SS Louis Sheid. This had already picked up 62 survivors from the SS Tajandoen which had been hit by a torpedo from Günther Prien's U-47, but was now in trouble herself, after hitting rocks near Thurlestone. It took the lifeboat crew two journeys to Hope Cove to land the survivors of the torpedoed ship, but the crew of the Louis Sheid eventually got ashore after it ran aground in Bigbury Bay. Coxswain Edwin Distin (a survivor of the 1916 capsize) was awarded the RNLI Silver Medal for his seamanship during this rescue. The rest of the crew were awarded bronze medals.

Four years later Distin was himself awarded a bronze medal when, on 4 December 1943, he rescued eleven people from a salvage craft off Start Point.

On 8 January 1992, the Baltic Exchange II went to help the MV Janet C, which was adrift without power near Start Point. The crew managed to get a line across and held the 1,200 long tons (1,200 t) coaster off the rocks for three hours, until a tug was able to take over the tow. Coxswain/Mechanic Frank Smith was awarded a bronze medal for his courage, seamanship and determination during this service.

The following are awards made at Salcombe:

- Albert Medal for Lifesaving (Gold) awarded by Queen Victoria
  Samuel Popplestone – 1866 (the first recipient of the award)
- RNLI Silver Medal
  Edwin William Distin, Coxswain – 1940
- RNLI Bronze Medal
  Edwin Chant, Second Coxswain – 1940
  Gerald Shepherd, Bowman – 1940
  John Allen, Mechanic – 1940
  Phillip Edwin Chant, Asst. Mechanic – 1940
  Thomas Cheeseman, crew member – 1940
  John Field, crew member – 1940
  George John Lake, crew member – 1940
  Edwin William Distin, Coxswain – 1944
  Frank Yeoman Smith, Coxswain/Mechanic – 1992
- The Thanks of the Institution inscribed on Vellum
  Dr Cock, chairman – 1917
  Charles Turner, Honorary Secretary – 1917
  H. W. Distin, Coxswain – 1972
  John Griffiths, Coxswain – 1979
- A Framed Letter of Thanks signed by the Chairman of the Institution
  John G. Griffiths, Coxswain – 1983
  Brian Cater, Acting Second Coxswain, & Asst. Mechanic – 1983
  Frank Y. Smith, Motor Mechanic – 1983
  Stanley Turns, crew member – 1983
  Roger Evans, crew member – 1983
  Michael Hicks, crew member – 1983
  David Lamble, crew member – 1983
  John Marjoram, Staff Coxswain – 1992
  Frank Smith, Coxswain/Mechanic – 1997
  Sam Viles, Helm – 2012
- Certificates of Appreciation
  Iain Dundas, crew member – 2010
  Adam Lilley, crew member – 2010
- Letters of Thanks
  Esther McLarty, crew member – 2012
  Matt Davies, crew member – 2012
- Commander, Order of the British Empire (CBE)
  Mark Peter Louden Dowie, CEO (RNLI). Former Lifeboat Operations Manager, Salcombe. For services to Maritime Safety – 2024KBH
- Member, Order of the British Empire (MBE)
  Frank Yeoman Smith, Former Coxswain/Second Mechanic – 2002NYH

== Roll of honour ==
In memory of those lost whilst serving at Salcombe:

- Lost when the Salcombe lifeboat William and Emma capsized, after a service to the schooner Western Lass of Plymouth, 27 October 1916.

Samuel March Distin, Coxswain (47)
Peter Heath Foale Sr., Second Coxswain (56)
James Alfred Canham (46)
John Ashley Cook (24)
James Henry Cove (36)
John Ambrose Cudd (42)
William Francis Cudd (44)

Albert Distin (49)
Peter Heath Foale Jr. (35)
William J. Foale (32)
William Wakeham Lamble (47)
Thomas Putt (44)
Albert Edwin Wood (29)

== Salcombe lifeboats ==
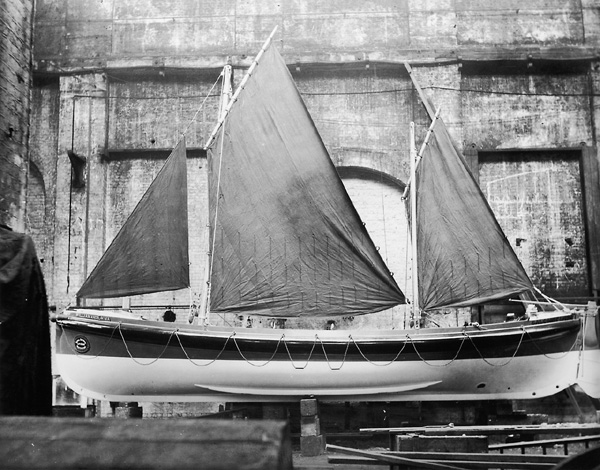
William and Emma (1904–1916)

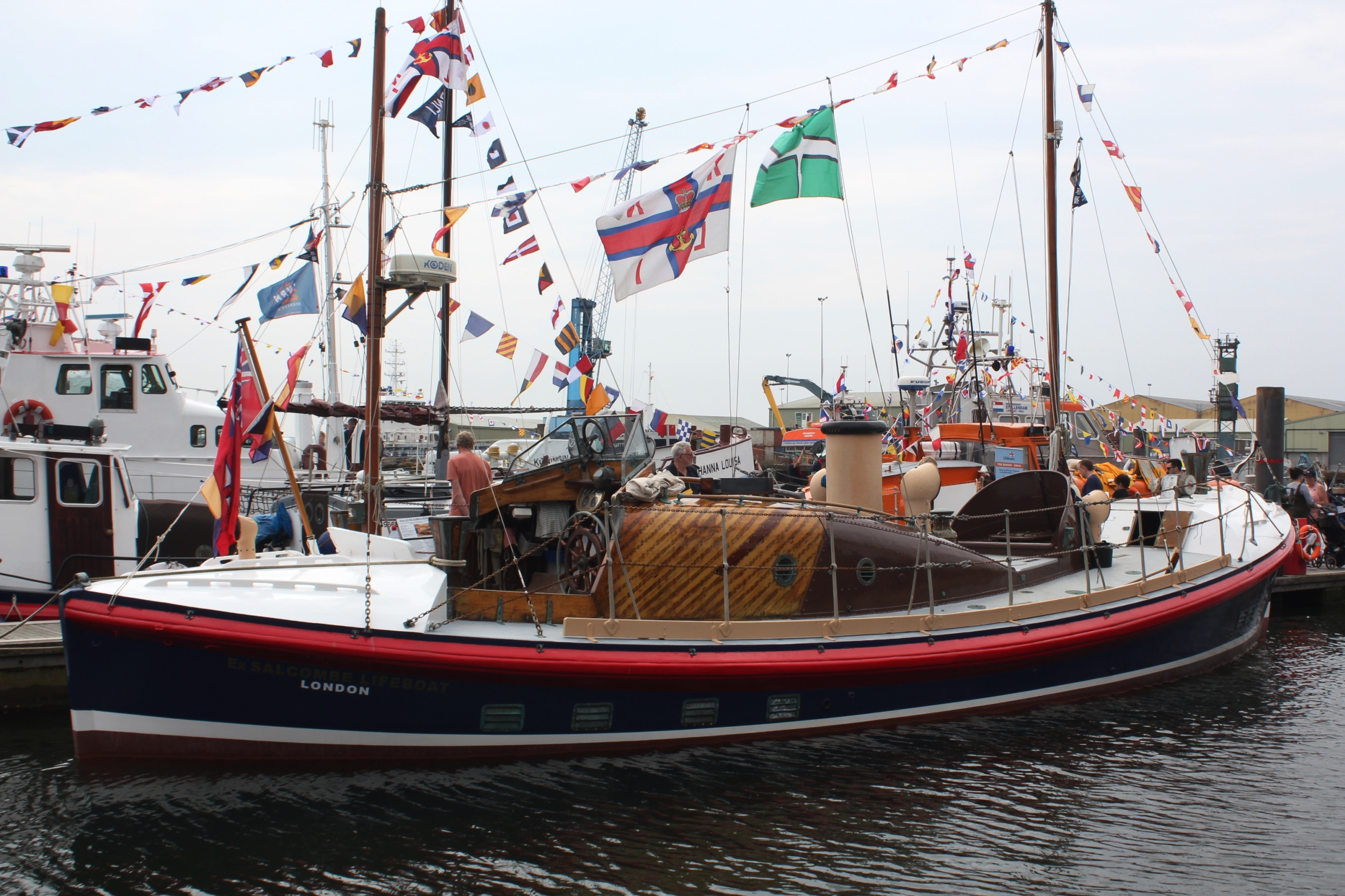
Samuel and Marie Parkhouse (1938–1962)

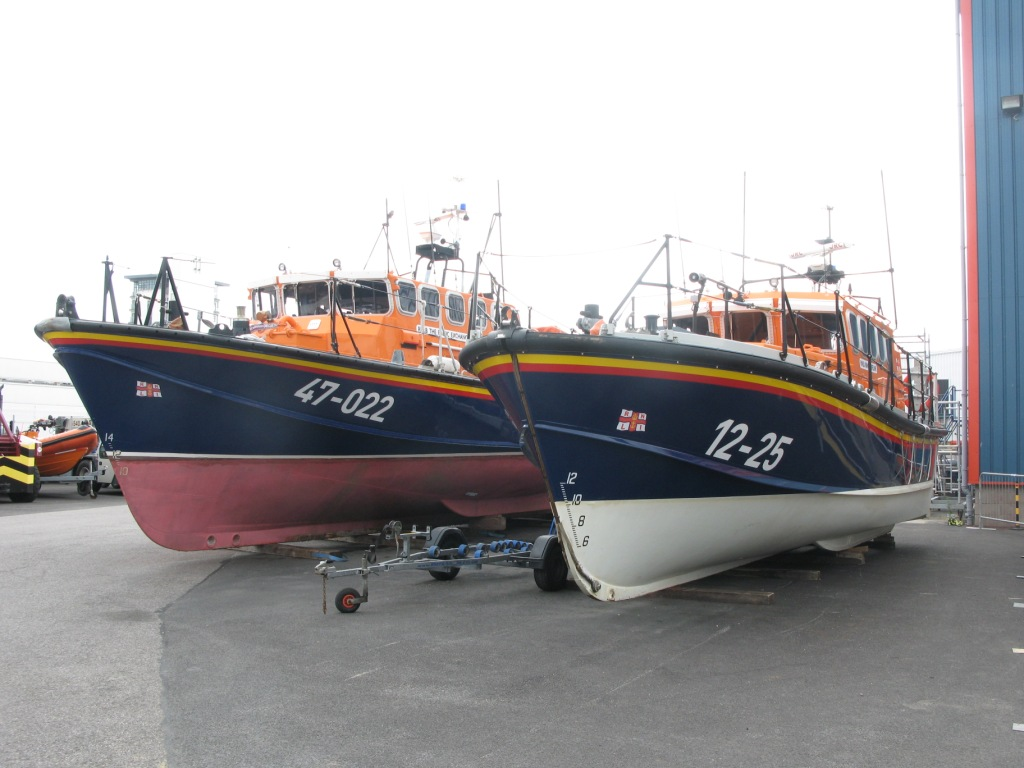
The Baltic Exchange II (left, 1987–2008)

=== Pulling and sailing lifeboats ===
On station	ON (Note: ON is the RNLI's Official Number of the boat.)	Name	Built	Class	Comments
1869–1887	Pre-529	Rescue	1869	33-foot Peake Self-righting (P&S)	(Note: 33 ft 0 in (10.06 m) x 8 ft 6 in (2.59 m) (10-oared) Peake-class self-righting (P&S) lifeboat, gift of Mr R. Durrant of Totnes, built by Woolfe of Shadwell, London, costing £283.); Sold in 1889.
1887–1904	142	Lesty	1887	34-foot Self-righting (P&S)	(Note: 34 ft 0 in (10.36 m) x 8 ft 0 in (2.44 m) (10-oared) self-righting (P&S) lifeboat, legacy of Mr W. Lesty of Stockwell, built by Hansen of Cowes, costing £347.); Broken up in 1904
1904–1916	524	William and Emma	1904	35-foot Liverpool (P&S)	(Note: 35 ft 0 in (10.67 m) x 10 ft 0 in (3.05 m) (12-oared) Liverpool-class non-self-righting (P&S) lifeboat, legacy of Mrs E. E. Cox of Weston-super-Mare, built by Thames Ironworks of Blackwall, London, costing £924.); Wrecked on service, 27 October 1916.
Station Closed 1916–1917
1917–1925	449	Sarah Ann Holden	1900	35-foot Self-righting (P&S)	(Note: 35 ft 0 in (10.67 m) x 8 ft 6 in (2.59 m) (10-oared) self-righting (P&S) lifeboat, legacy of Miss S. A. Holden of Rochdale, built by Thames Ironworks of Blackwall, London, costing £869.); First stationed at Johnshaven, Scotland, in 1900. Sold locally in 1925.

Station closed in 1925.
Pre ON numbers are unofficial numbers used by the Lifeboat Enthusiasts' Society to reference early lifeboats not included on the official RNLI list.

=== Motor lifeboats ===
On station	ON	Op.No. (Note: Op.No. is the RNLI's Operational Number of the boat carried on the hull.)	Name	Built	Class	Comments
1930–1938	672	—	Alfred and Clara Heath	1922	40-foot Self-righting (motor)	Previously at Brixham. Transferred to St Peter Port.
1938–1962	805	—	Samuel and Marie Parkhouse	1938	46-foot Watson (shallow draught)	Special design to cope with the shallow conditions on The Bar at Salcombe. Sold in 1963. Renamed Oniros. Last reported at Titchmarsh Marina, Walton-on-the-Naze, December 2025.
1962–1988	964	—	The Baltic Exchange	1962	47-foot Watson	Capsized on service, but righted by air-bag, 10 April 1983. Sold 1989. Renamed Baltic Air. Last reported as fire damaged at Blyth, Northumberland, February 2025.
1988–2008	1130	47-022	The Baltic Exchange II	1987	Tyne	Sold in 2010 to the Seychelles Coastguard.
2008–	1289	16-09	The Baltic Exchange III	2008	Tamar	

More post-service details can be found on the respective lifeboat class pages.

=== Inshore lifeboats ===
On station	Op.No.	Name	Class	Comments
2003	B-755	London's Anniversary	B-class (Atlantic 75)	First deployed as a relief lifeboat in 1999.
2003–2018	B-794	Joan Bate	B-class (Atlantic 75)	Transferred to Dart Lifeboat Station for evaluation / training.
2018–	B-905	Gladys Hilda Mustoe	B-class (Atlantic 85)	

== See also ==
- List of RNLI stations
- List of former RNLI stations
- Royal National Lifeboat Institution lifeboats
