= Dart Lifeboat Station =

RNLI lifeboat station in Devon, England

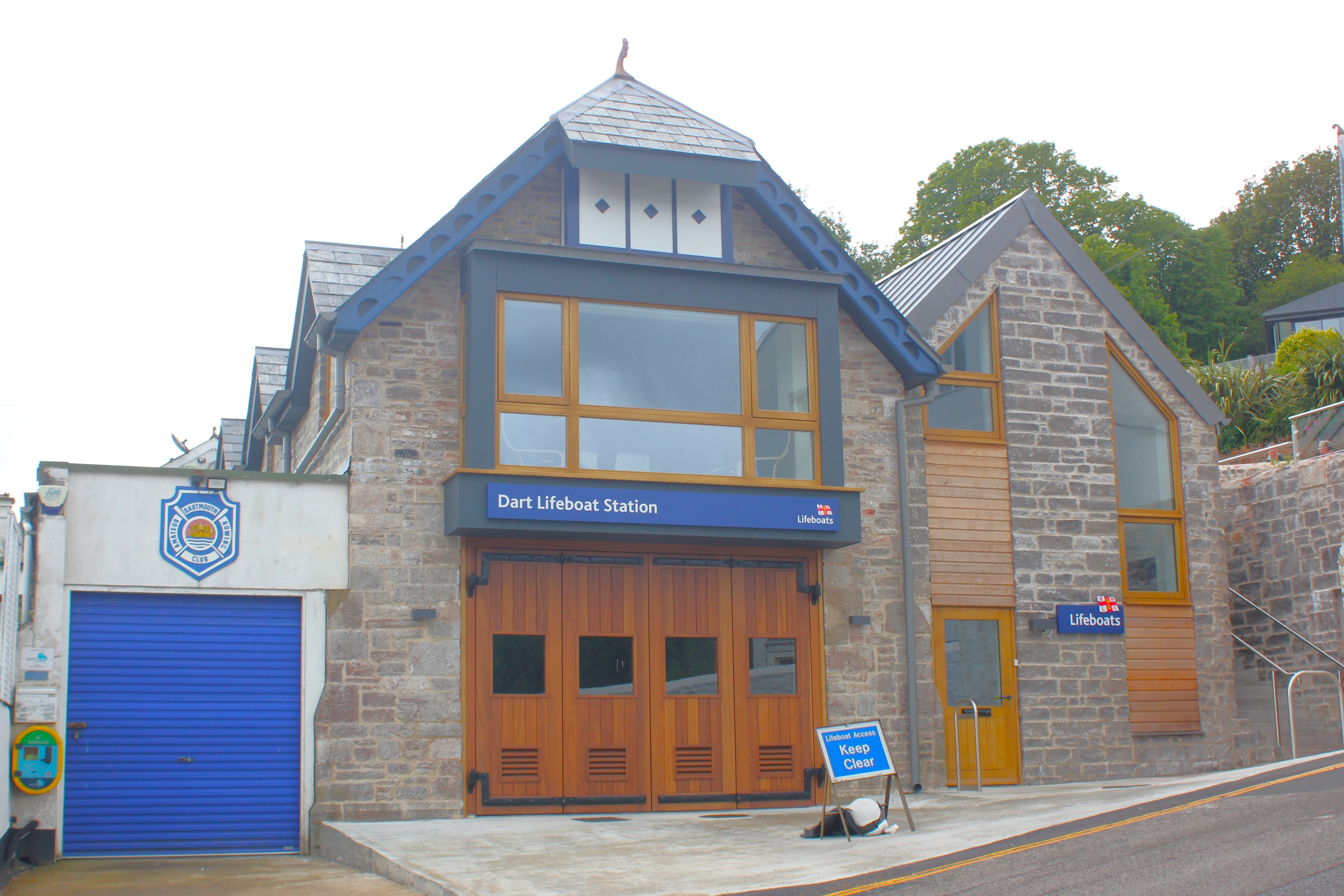
- The lifeboat station in 2026

- Location within Devon
- Former names: Dartmouth Lifeboat Station

General information
- Type: RNLI Lifeboat Station
- Location: Ferry View House, Sandquay Road, Dartmouth, Devon, TQ6 9PH, United Kingdom
- Coordinates: 50.356694°N 3.577417°W
- Opened: 1878-1896; 2007 Coronation Park; 2026 current site
- Owner: Royal National Lifeboat Institution

Website
- Dart RNLI Lifeboat Station

Dart Lifeboat Station can be found on Sandquay Road in Dartmouth, a town on the west bank of the River Dart, approximately 31 miles (50 km) south of the City of Exeter, on the south-east coast of the county of Devon, England.

A lifeboat was first stationed at Dartmouth by the Royal National Lifeboat Institution (RNLI), operating from 1878 to 1896. The RNLI re-established an Inshore lifeboat station at Dartmouth in 2007.

The station currently operates a B-class (Atlantic 85) Inshore lifeboat, Frank C Samworth (B-931), on station since 2022, and the smaller D-class (IB1) Inshore lifeboat, Dudley Jane (D-838), on station since 2019.

== History ==
Dartmouth is a small port on the west side of the natural harbour formed by the River Dart. In the 1860s, the Dartmouth and Torbay Railway established more quays on the opposite bank at Kingswear.

Ever since its founding in 1824, the Royal National Institution for the Preservation of Life from Shipwreck (RNIPLS), later to become the RNLI in 1854, would award medals for deeds of gallantry at sea, even if no lifeboats were involved.

On 29 June 1838, the French fishing boat Victoire was wrecked near Dartmouth. The crew of five were rescued by Lt. William Lane, of H.M. Coastguard, Dartmouth, and his crew of nine. Lane was awarded the RNIPLS Silver Medal. A second silver medal was awarded to Lt. James Clayton, of H.M. Coastguard, Paignton in 1842, when he and his crew rescued the Master and boy from the sloop Harmony of Brixham, on 7 January.

The inauguration of Dartmouth Lifeboat Station took place on 23 October 1878, in response to the wishes of the local residents, expressed at a meeting convened by the mayor, "where the services of the Boat may be made available, in conjunction with a steam-tug, in the event of shipwrecks occurring in Start Bay". A new 33-foot-long (10 m) Peake-class self-righting 'Pulling and Sailing' (P&S) lifeboat, one with sails and (10) oars, had been constructed by Woolfe of Shadwell, London, at a cost of £329, and arrived by rail at Kingswear station on 22 October 1878.

A procession of dignitaries including the mayor, benevolent societies, coastguard and lifeboat men, accompanied by bands of music, proceeded through the town to the new boathouse, which had been constructed at Sandquay, at a cost of £418-16s, and where the new lifeboat was waiting ready for launch. The cost of the lifeboat and station was received from the gift of £900 from Mrs Hargreaves of Claygate, Surrey.

After the usual acknowledgments, and the hymn "For those in Peril on the Sea", a service of dedication was carried out by the Royal Navy chaplain, the Rev. E. M. Johnstone, MA, RN, assisted by the Rev. J. H. Knapp. In accordance with the donor's wishes, the lifeboat was named Maud Hargreaves, in memory of her late daughter. The lifeboat was then launched on demonstration to the assembled crowd, during which a small boy was picked up, who had fallen in the water.

During the summer the lifeboat was kept in a boat house at Sand Quay, but during the winter it was kept afloat in Warfleet Creek where it would be quicker to respond to any ships in distress. A new slipway was constructed at Sandquay in 1879, at a cost of £61.

The Maud Hargreaves was never launched on service. A replacement lifeboat arrived in September 1887. The 34 ft (10 m) lifeboat, built by Forrestt of Limehouse, London, at a cost of £526, was funded by Mrs A. Shaw of Exeter, in memory of her late husband. In front of the assembled crowd, and the band of HMS Britannia on 20 September 1887, the lifeboat was named Henry and Amanda Shaw (ON 129), before being launched to the sound of "Rule Britannia".

In freezing temperatures and rough seas on 14 March 1893, the Pilot Cutter collided with a small boat carrying five men. The Cutter's boarding boat was launched, but only one man was saved. For his efforts to save life, Trinity Pilot William Robert Kelland was awarded the RNLI Silver Medal. The Dartmouth lifeboat was launched, but a search for the other four men was unsuccessful.

The following year, the Dartmouth lifeboat was launched to the aid of ketch Prince of Wales of Brixham, when the vessel stranded at Kingswear. With four lifeboat men aboard helping pump water, the vessel was safely beached one hour later. It was the only effective service provided by either of the Dartmouth lifeboats.

Despite the treacherous shores around the entrance to the port of Dartmouth, the harbour authorities operated a successful pilot service, In 18 years of service, the lifeboat had only been launched three times, completing only one effective service, to the Prince of Wales. At a meeting of the RNLI committee of management on Thursday 10 September 1896, it was decided to close Dartmouth Lifeboat Station. The lifeboat on station at the time of closure was sold locally, with the boathouse being sold for £100, and subsequently used by the Dartmouth Amateur Rowing Club.

== 2004 onwards ==
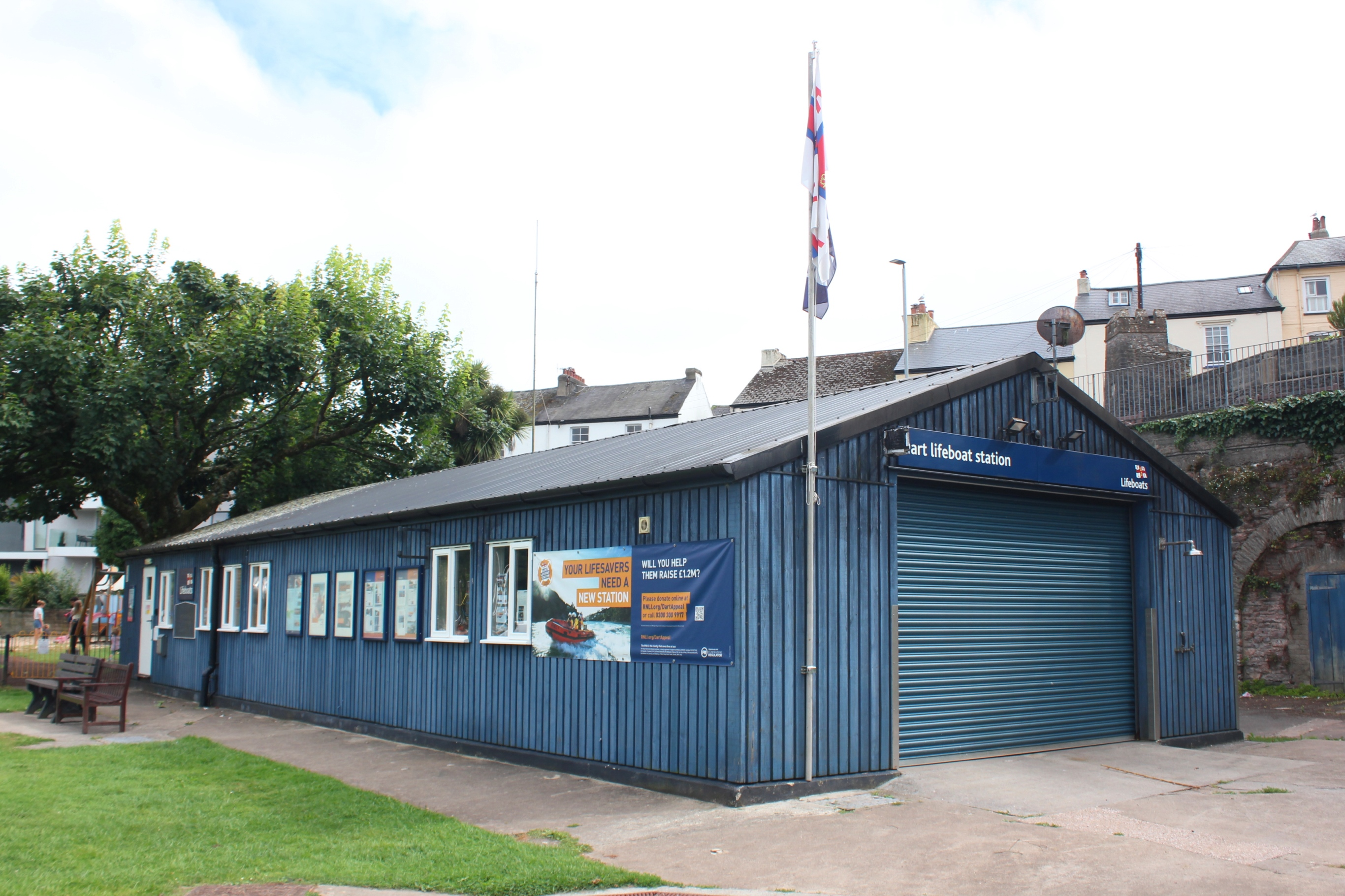
Coronation Park lifeboat station, in use from 2007 to 2025

In 2004, with consideration that the nearest lifeboats, at Salcombe or Torbay, were 30 minutes away, a letter was received by the Institution from the Health and Safety group of the Dartmouth Market and Coastal Town Initiative, proposing that a lifeboat should once again be placed at Dartmouth. A management group was established on 22 November 2004, with Robert Clements offering to be Lifeboat Operations Manager. The group were invited to visit Rock lifeboat station, on the north-west coast of Cornwall, being the newest station to become operational.

An appeal was started in July 2006, to raise £205,000 to set up the station, with a boathouse, crew equipment, an inshore lifeboat, and a tractor and trailer. £25,000 for crew kit was received from The Hadley Trust, and £29,000 to buy the lifeboat was donated by Caterfood, via Mike Felton. 11 different sites for a station were evaluated, with an old tennis pavilion and disused Play School on Coronation Park chosen as the most suitable, due to a nearby slipway.

The D-class (EA16) Inshore lifeboat Bob Savage (D-520) arrived from the relief fleet on 8 August 2007, for a period of intense training, and the partially prefabricated timber station building was erected in mid-September. On 27 October 2007, Dart Lifeboat Station was declared operational.

The first shout came soon afterwards, on 24 November 2007, the lifeboat Bob Savage called to the aid of a young man thrown from a speedboat, when it hit a submerged object. Pulled from the water by a fishing boat crew, he was brought ashore by the lifeboat, and treated at hospital for leg injuries and hypothermia.

After a short period with a second lifeboat from the relief fleet on station, Peterborough Beer Festival 1 (D-523), the new D-class (IB1) lifeboat funded by Caterford (South West) Ltd arrived on station in July 2008, and was named Spirit of the Dart (D-702).

Spirit of the Dart (D-702) served Dart lifeboat station for 11 years. A replacement boat, Dudley Jane (D-838), was the gift of Mrs Sarah Fuller, and arrived on 4 August 2019.

=== Atlantic-class ===
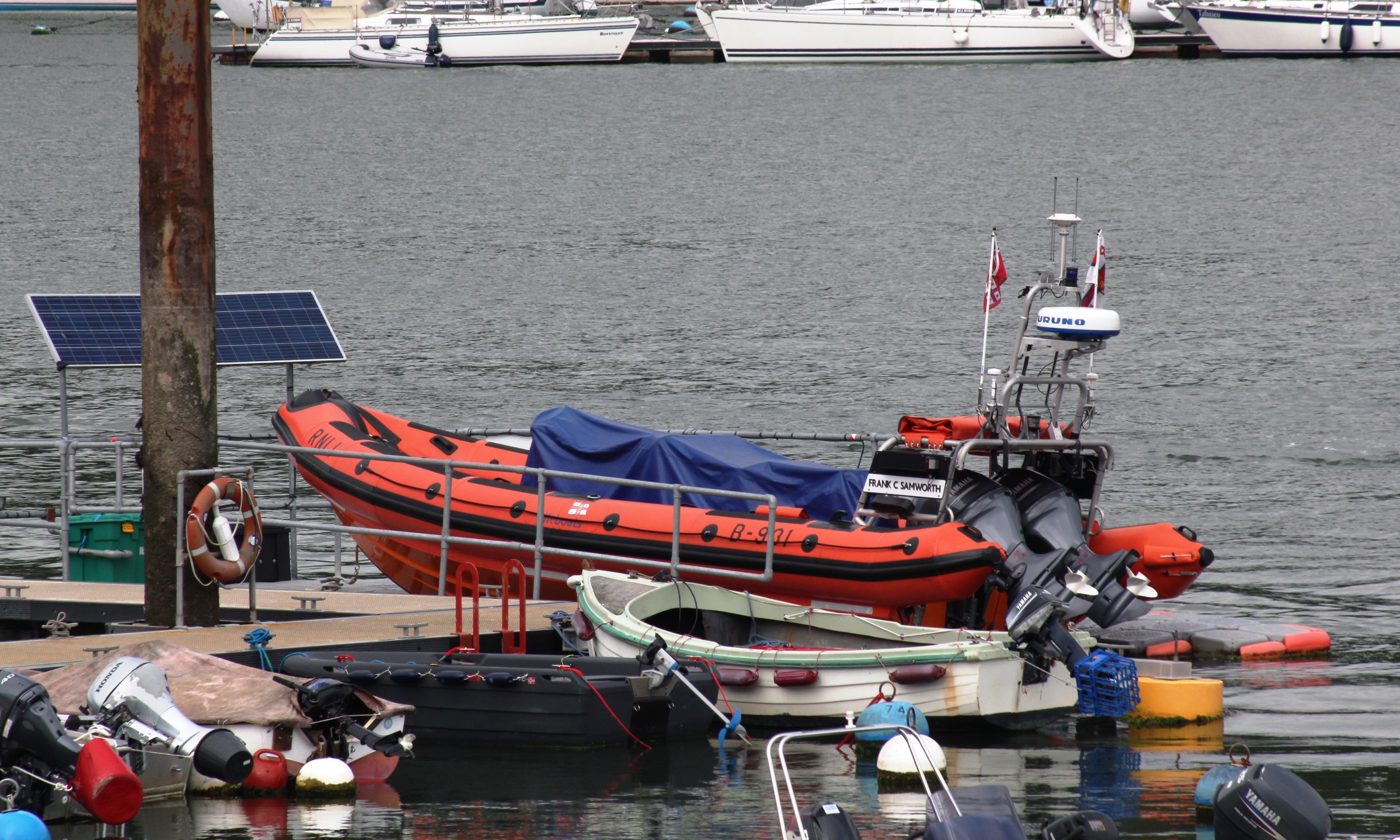
B-class (Atlantic 85) Frank C Samworth (B-931) on the Aquadock

Following a 20-month trial period with the twin-engined B-class (Atlantic 75) Inshore lifeboats Millennium Forrester (B-775) and Joan Bate (B-794), the even larger B-class (Atlantic 85) lifeboat, Norma Ethel Vinall (B-825), from the relief fleet, was placed on service, and formally recognised as an operational asset on 28 August 2020, stored and launched from a floating 'Aqua Dock', attached to a pontoon in the river.

Serving for just two years, the relief boat was replaced by a brand new Atlantic 85 lifeboat in 2020. The new lifeboat was funded by "Auntie Jill", Jill Samworth, who in the last years of her life, travelled 16 mi (26 km) to the lifeboat station every week by taxi, from her home in Thurlestone. Having never had children, she would bring cooked food or expensive biscuits for her 'adopted' lifeboat family. Mrs Samworth died in 2017, and left a 'generous' sum to the station. At a ceremony in Coronation Park on Saturday 20 May 2023, the new lifeboat was named Frank C Samworth (B-931) at her request, in memory of her late husband.

=== New (old) station ===
After a seven-year fundraising project to raise money and acquire new fit-for-purpose premises, Dart RNLI moved to a permanent new home; the original 1878 boathouse at Ferry View House on Sandquay Road. Considerable construction and refurbishment work was carried out by Nevada Construction, with the old station roof being raised, and the building being fully refurbished, with a new added extension built to blend in with the character of the old building. A crew training area occupies the first floor, and the building has an office, and a purpose built kit and changing area. The D-class ILB resides in the boat-hall, which now has easy access to the river, rather than having to negotiate a park, with the B-class moored on the Aqua-dock at Dart Marina. The building was declared operational on 8 December 2025. The building on Coronation Park was handed over to be run by the Dartmouth Youth Group, for the benefit of the community.

At a ceremony held at 12:30pm on Thursday 16 April 2026, the 1878 station was formally re-opened by H.R.H. The Princess Royal, accompanied by Vice admiral Sir Tim Laurence, a vice president of the RNLI. The Princess Royal unveiled a plaque on the front of the building, and Sir Tim Laurence presented a 20-year service medal to volunteer Helm Rich Eggleton.

== Area of operation ==
The Atlantic 85 can go out in Force 6/7 winds (Force 5/6 at night) and can operate at up to 35 knots (65 km/h) for 2½ hours.The smaller D-class ILB has a maximum speed of 25 knots (46 km/h) and can operate for three hours. It covers the River Dart and the nearby south Devon coast. Adjacent lifeboats – both Inshore and All-weather lifeboats – are at Torbay to the East, and Salcombe to the West.

== Station honours ==
The following awards have been made at Dartmouth:

- RNIPLS Silver Medal
  Lt. William Lane, H.M. Coastguard, Dartmouth – 1838
  Lt. James Clayton, H.M. Coastguard, Paignton – 1842
- RNLI Silver Medal
  William Robert Kelland, Trinity Pilot – 1893

== Dartmouth and Dart lifeboats ==
=== Dartmouth (1878–1896) ===
On station	ON (Note: ON is the RNLI's Official Number of the boat.)	Name	Built	Class	Comments
1878–1887	Pre-631	Maud Hargreaves	1878	33-foot Peake Self-righting (P&S)	(Note: 33 ft 0 in (10.06 m) x 8 ft 6 in (2.59 m) (10-oared) Peake-class self-righting (P&S) lifeboat, gift of Mrs E. Hargreaves of Claygate, Surrey, built by Woolfe of Shadwell, London, costing £329.); Broken up in 1887.
1887–1896	129	Henry and Amanda Shaw	1887	34-foot Self-righting (P&S)	(Note: 34 ft 0 in (10.36 m) x 8 ft 0 in (2.44 m) (10-oared) self-righting (P&S) lifeboat, gift of Mrs A. Shaw of Exeter, built by Forrestt of Limehouse, London, costing £526.); Sold locally in 1896.

Station closed in 1896.
Pre ON numbers are unofficial numbers used by the Lifeboat Enthusiasts' Society to reference early lifeboats not included on the official RNLI list.

=== Dart (from 2007) ===
The D-class lifeboat is kept on a carriage and is towed to the river for launching by a tractor; the B-class lifeboat is moored in a Drive-on Aquadock moored in the river.

==== D-class ====
On station	Op.No. (Note: Op.No. is the RNLI's Operational Number of the boat carried on the hull.)	Name	Class	Comments
2007–2008	D-520	Bob Savage	D-class (EA16)	First stationed at Aldeburgh in 1997
2008	D-523	Peterborough Beer Festival 1	D-class (EA16)	First stationed at Redcar in 1997.
2008–2019	D-702	Spirit of the Dart	D-class (IB1)	
2019–	D-838	Dudley Jane	D-class (IB1)	

==== B-class ====
On station	Op.No.	Name	Class	Comments
2018	B-775	Millennium Forrester	B-class (Atlantic 75)	First stationed at Plymouth.
2018–2020	B-794	Joan Bate	B-class (Atlantic 75)	First stationed at Salcombe. Transferred to Weston-super-Mare.
2020–2022	B-825	Norma Ethel Vinall	B-class (Atlantic 85)	Initially deployed in the relief fleet in 2008.
2022–	B-931	Frank C Samworth	B-class (Atlantic 85)	

== See also ==
- List of RNLI stations
- List of former RNLI stations
- Royal National Lifeboat Institution lifeboats
- National Coastwatch Institution Froward Point, near Dartmouth
