= Teignmouth Lifeboat Station =

RNLI lifeboat station in Devon, England

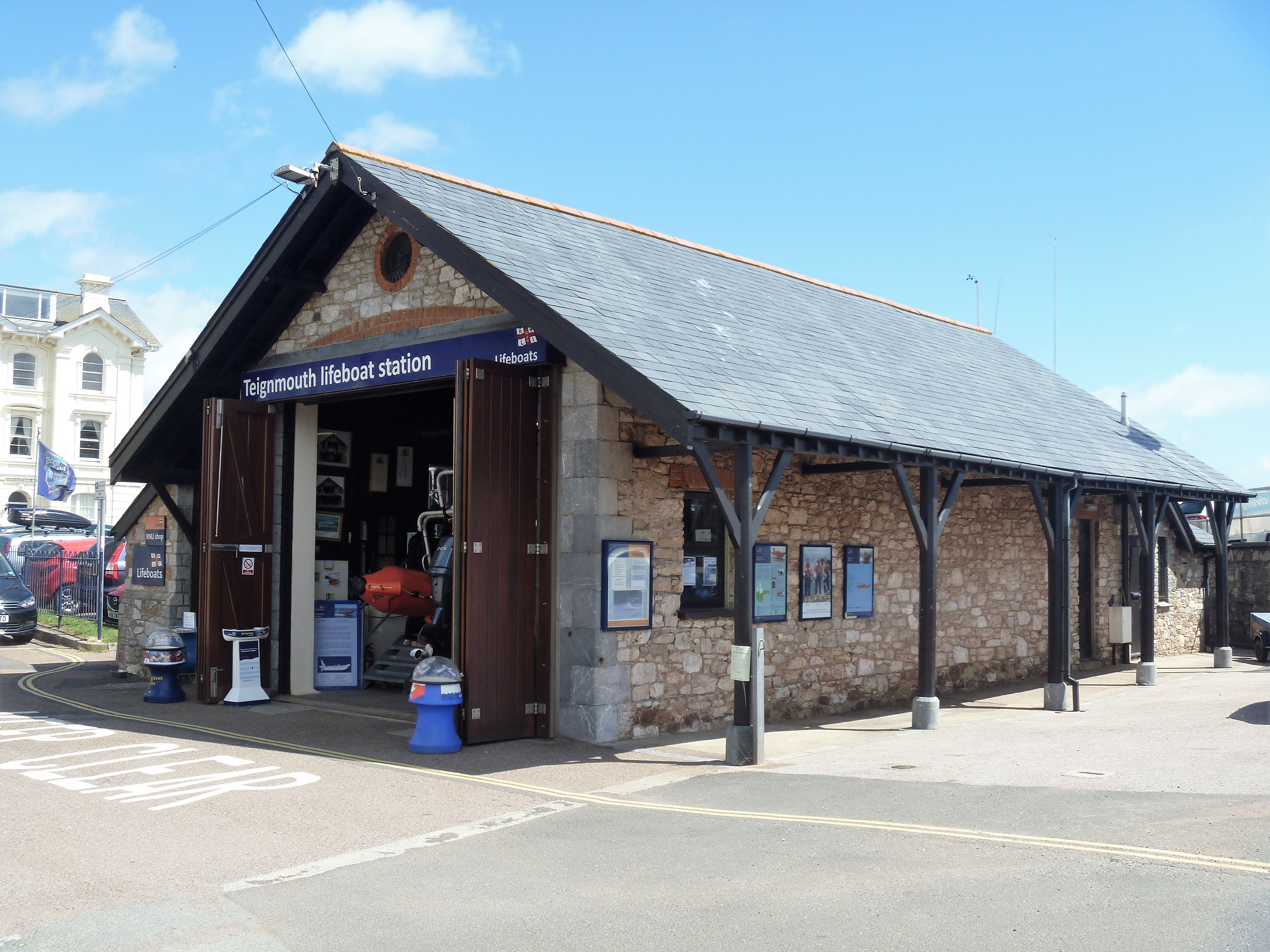
- 1863 Teignmouth lifeboat house in 2017

- Location within Devon

General information
- Type: Lifeboat Station
- Location: The Point, Teignmouth, South Devon, TQ14 8BW, England
- Coordinates: 50.542157°N 3.497941°W
- Opened: 1862
- Cost: £223
- Owner: Royal National Lifeboat Institution

Website
- Teignmouth RNLI lifeboat station

Listed Building – Grade II
- Feature: Old lifeboat house
- Designated: 23 November 1989
- Reference no.: 1269089

Teignmouth Lifeboat Station can be found on Lifeboat Lane, at the end of The Den promenade, in Teignmouth, a fishing port and seaside resort sitting on the north shore at the mouth of the River Teign, approximately 15 miles (24 km) south of the City of Exeter, on the south-east coast of the county of Devon, England.

A lifeboat station was established at Teignmouth by The Shipwrecked Fishermen and Mariners' Royal Benevolent Society (SFMRBS) in 1851. Management of the station transferred to the Royal National Lifeboat Institution (RNLI) in 1854. The station operated until its closure in 1940. The RNLI re-established an Inshore lifeboat station at Teignmouth in 1990.

The station currently operates a B-class (Atlantic 85) Inshore lifeboat (ILB), Claude and Kath (B-947), on station since 2024.

== History ==
In 1851, the president of the Royal National Institution for the Preservation of Life from Shipwreck (RNIPLS), The Duke of Northumberland, offered a prize of 100 guineas for the best design for a self-righting lifeboat. The prize was won by boat-builder Mr James Beeching of Great Yarmouth.

As a result of this award, several of the Beeching "Northumberland Prize" lifeboats were ordered by the Shipwrecked Fishermen and Mariners’ Royal Benevolent Society (SFMRBS), being dispatched to their existing or new stations. Funded by the SFMRBS and local subscription, a 28-foot (8.5 m) Beeching lifeboat, Teignmouth, arrived in 1851, kept near the Custom House in an earlier boathouse on the beach. At the time, the nearest other lifeboats were at St Mary's in the Isles of Scilly to the west, and Shoreham Harbour to the east.

By 1854, the SFMRBS was involved in the management of eight lifeboat stations, Lytham, Rhyl, Hornsea, Tenby, Llanelli, Portmadoc, Newhaven and Teignmouth. On 7 December 1854, an agreement was made between the SFMRBS and the RNLI, where the former would concentrate on the welfare of those rescued, whilst the latter would be involved in lifeboats, stations and rescues. Management of all eight stations was transferred to the RNLI.

From the outset, the Beeching lifeboats had been plagued with issues. At least three capsized, and failed to self-right, with the loss of 14 lives.A damning report published in "The Life-boat", regarding loss of life from both Lytham and Rhyl lifeboats, dated 1 December 1852, although apparently published after the Rhyl disaster in 1853, highlighted the fact that although both boats carried a brass plaque with "Northumberland Prize Boat", neither had been constructed to the same design or standards.

Following the subsequent capsize of the Teignmouth lifeboat in June 1855, fortunately with no loss of life, at the meeting of the committee on Thursday 5 July 1855, it was resolved that the Teignmouth lifeboat be returned to London, and modified to the design of Mr Peake. Over 560 lb (250 kg) of solid ballast was added by boat-builders Forrestt of Limehouse, to correct stability and improve self-righting. The boat was returned to Teignmouth in December 1855.

In 1862, a new boathouse costing £223 was constructed on The Den, with doors facing The Ness. The following year, the boathouse was re-constructed, this time with the doors facing the harbour for ease of launching, and was formally opened on 16 May 1863.

A 33 ft (10 m) experimental lifeboat, the first one built of the best Charcoal iron, by Hepworth of Millwall, under the guidance of lifeboat designer Joseph Prowse, of H.M. Dockyard, Woolwich, Surveyor to the Institution, arrived on station for trials in October 1863. The boat was transported to her station free of charge, by the Great Western, Bristol and Exeter Railway and South Devon railway companies.

A financial gift to the Institution was received from Messrs. Gilman and Co., raised by their customers from the British settlements at Hong Kong and Shanghai. The funds were appropriated to the Teignmouth station, and with consideration to the subscribers, who had remembered the work of the Institution whilst away from the country, the lifeboat was named China.

The Iron lifeboat was transferred to New Brighton after one year, replaced by a standard wooden 32 ft (9.8 m) 10-oared Prowse-class lifeboat, built by Forrestt of Limehouse, London, at a cost of £230. The funds from Gilman & Co. were still appropriated to Teignmouth, with the boat again being named China. Further funding from the Teignmouth Bazarre Lifeboat Fund brought about a name change to Arnold in 1880.

On 30 July 1894, a new 34 ft (10 m) 'Pulling and Sailing (P&S) lifeboat, constructed by Waterman of Cremyll, arrived at Teignmouth. A grand "Life-boat Demonstration Day" followed on 16 August, when the lifeboat was drawn through the town in grand procession to the lifeboat station, headed by the band of the Artillery Volunteers. The lifeboat had been funded from the bequest of £1000 from Mrs Staniforth of Broom Lodge, Broomhall, Sheffield, and after the usual acknowledgments and a service of dedication, the lifeboat was named Alfred Staniforth (ON 363) in memory of her late husband, and then launched on demonstration.

No reasons have been given, but the crew took an instant dislike to the new boat. It was returned to London on 30 November, without ever having been launched on service, and was sold. Fortunately, the old boat Arnold (ON 42) was still in storage, and was returned to Teignmouth, serving until 1896. The funds were re-appropriated to a second replacement, a 35 ft (11 m) lifeboat built by Hansen of Cowes, which was duly named Alfred Staniforth (ON 389).

On 10 October 1907, the Alfred Staniforth (ON 389) was launched to aid the schooner Tehwija, which had run aground near the mouth of the river with eight crew on board. W. J. Burden, Honorary Secretary, went out in the lifeboat to steer it, while Coxswain George Rice and the bowman added extra manpower to the oars. It took the lifeboat crew two attempts to row out over the bar at the mouth of the river into the heavy seas. Within fifteen minutes of the crew being rescued, the storm had completely wrecked the grounded ship. Burden and Rice were each awarded the RNLI Silver Medal for their service that day.

The RNLI started to increase the deployment of motor-powered lifeboats after World War I, which allowed lifeboats to cover larger areas in far less time. Motor lifeboats were placed at Brixham in 1922, and at Exmouth in 1933, but one was never allocated to Teignmouth. The 'pulling and sailing' lifeboat Henry Finlay (ON 618) was retained until 6 November 1940, when the station was closed temporarily. It was then stored in the boathouse on standby through World War II until July 1945, when the station was closed permanently, and the lifeboat was sold for £200.

== 1990s onwards ==
In March 1990, a B-class (Atlantic 21) Inshore lifeboat, Lord Brotherton (B-538 ), was stationed at Teignmouth on a trial basis. However, the boat was damaged after just two or three weeks, and was exchanged for an unnamed Atlantic 21, (B-533). The station became operational on 3 November 1990. The old boathouse, used as a café for many years, was available, and was converted now to house the Inshore lifeboat and launch tractor, with works completed in 1991. The following year, another B-class Atlantic 21, Frank and Dorothy (B-588), was made the permanent Teignmouth lifeboat, and served until 2006.

Frank and Dorothy was replaced on 1 August 2006, by the new larger and faster B-class (Atlantic 85) lifeboat,The Two Annes (B-809). At a naming ceremony in August 2006, the lifeboat was named in honour of the benefactor, Anne Bache, and of her brother Bill's wife, Ann.

Two rescues carried out in 2008 and 2009 would see each crew member awarded with "A Framed Letter of Thanks signed by the Chairman of the Institution".

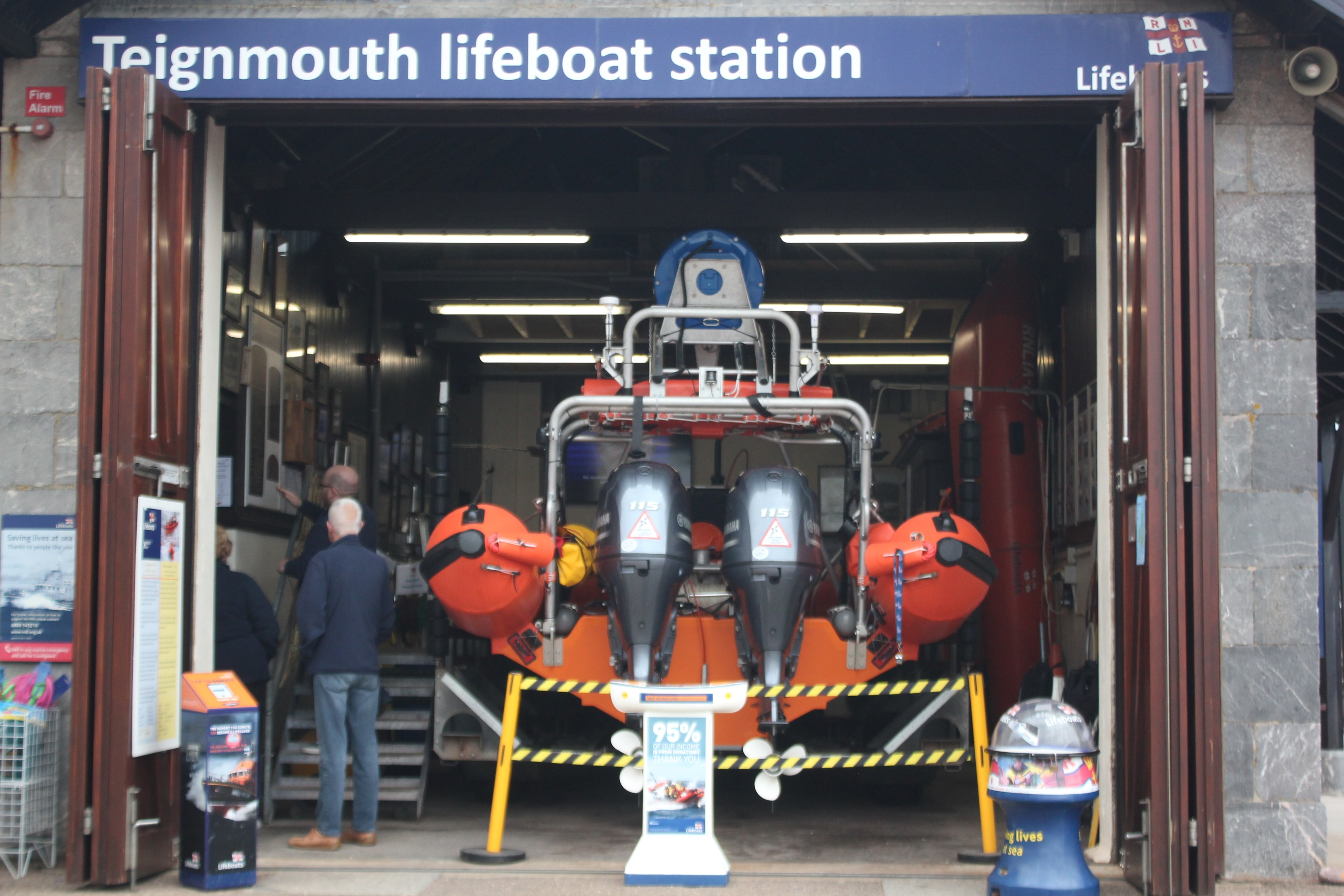
B-class (Atlantic 85) Inshore lifeboat Claude and Kath (B-947) in the boathouse, May 2025

In turn, a new Atlantic 85 Inshore lifeboat replaced The Two Annes on 14 November 2024. The lifeboat had primarily been funded by the late Miss Jean Stevenson of Chesterfield, Derbyshire. Jean had been a long-time supporter of the RNLI, a passion started by her father Claude, who organised their local lifeboat Flag Day. One of her treasured possessions was a silver statuette of a Lifeboat Man, presented to Claude for his fundraising efforts.

At a ceremony on Saturday 7 June 2025, the lifeboat was named Claude and Kath (B-947) in memory of Jean's parents. Additional funding for the boat was received from the legacy of Joan Eileen Kenney, of Dorset, in memory of her late husband, John Kenney.

== Description ==
The boathouse is a single storey masonry building. The slate roof overhangs both sides by a considerable extent and is supported on upright posts. When it was refurbished for its 1991 reopening, a fund-raising gift shop was installed under the eastern overhang.

Large doors open onto the road. When the lifeboat is to be launched, a Talus MB-764 County launch tractor pushes it on its 'bedstead' carriage down the road opposite, to a slipway on the harbour.

== Area of operation ==
The Atlantic 85 can go out in Force 6/7 winds (Force 5/6 at night) and can operate at up to 35 knots (65 km/h) for 2½ hours. Adjacent lifeboats – both ILBs and larger All-weather lifeboats – are stationed at Exmouth to the east, and Torbay to the west.

== Station awards ==
The following are awards made at Teignmouth:

- RNLI Silver Medal
  John B Bulkeley, Coxswain – 1864
  William Stuggins, Second Coxswain – 1870
  William Burden, Honorary Secretary – 1907
  George Rice, Coxswain – 1907
- A Framed Letter of Thanks signed by the Chairman of the Institution
  Daniel McCarthy (age 17) – 1997
  Luke McCarthy (age 19) – 1997
  Humphrey Vince – 2008
  Charlie Woolnough – 2008
  Nicola White – 2008
  Adam Truhol – 2008
  William Burton – 2010
  Richard Boss – 2010
  Kevin Clifton – 2010
  Dave Matthews – 2010

== Teignmouth lifeboats ==
=== Pulling and sailing lifeboats ===
On station	ON (Note: ON is the RNLI's Official Number of the boat.)	Name	Built	Class	Comments
1851–1863	Pre-238	Teignmouth	1851	28-foot Beeching Self-righting (P&S)	(Note: 28 ft 0 in (8.53 m) x 7 ft 0 in (2.13 m) (10-oared) Beeching-class self-righting (P&S) lifeboat, funded by the SFMRBS, built by James Beeching of Great Yarmouth, costing £124.); Capsized 1855. Condemned in 1863.
1863–1864	Pre-406	China	1863	33-foot Prowse Self-righting (P&S) (Iron)	(Note: 33 ft 0 in (10.06 m) x 8 ft 2 in (2.49 m) (10-oared) Prowse self-righting (P&S) lifeboat, gift of Gilman & Co. of Hong Kong, built by Hepworth of Millwall, London, costing £351.); Experimental iron self-righting lifeboat. Transferred to New Brighton and renamed Willie and Arthur.
1864–1880	Pre-421	China	1864	32-foot Prowse Self-righting (P&S)	(Note: 32 ft 0 in (9.75 m) x 7 ft 4 in (2.24 m) (10-oared) Prowse-class self-righting (P&S) lifeboat, gift of Gilman & Co. of Hong Kong, built by Forrestt of Limehouse, London, costing £230.); Renamed Arnold in 1880.
1880–1887	Pre-421	Arnold	1864	32-foot Prowse Self-righting (P&S)	(Note: Funded by the Teignmouth LB Bazaar fund, and named after the chairman Mr B. Arnold, in recognition of his fund-raising efforts.); Broken up in 1887.
1887–1894	42	Arnold	1887	34-foot 2in Self-righting (P&S)	(Note: 34 ft 2 in (10.41 m) x 7 ft 6 in (2.29 m) (10-oared) self-righting (P&S) lifeboat, gift of the Devon and Cornwall LB Bazaar fund, built by Woolfe of Shadwell, London, costing £297.); Withdrawn to storage in 1894.
1894	363	Alfred Staniforth	1894	34-foot Self-righting (P&S)	(Note: 34 ft 0 in (10.36 m) x 7 ft 6 in (2.29 m) (10-oared) self-righting (P&S) lifeboat, legacy of Mrs Staniforth of Sheffield, built by Waterman of Cremyll, costing £394.); Not Approved. Returned to London in November 1894 and sold.
1894–1896	42	Arnold	1887	34-foot 2in Self-righting (P&S)	Returned from storage in 1894. Broken up in 1896.
1896–1930	389	Alfred Staniforth	1896	35-foot Self-righting (P&S)	(Note: 35 ft 0 in (10.67 m) x 8 ft 6 in (2.59 m) (10-oared) self-righting (P&S) lifeboat, legacy of Mrs Staniforth of Sheffield, built by Hansen of Cowes, costing £481.); Sold in 1931.
1931–1940	618	Henry Finlay	1911	35-foot Self-righting (P&S)	(Note: 35 ft 0 in (10.67 m) x 8 ft 6 in (2.59 m) (10-oared) self-righting (P&S) lifeboat, legacy of Mr H. Finlay of Highbury, built by Thames Ironworks of Blackwall, London, costing £923.); Previously at Machrihanish. Sold in 1945. Renamed Teignmouth Belle, later Henrietta. Last reported as Henry Finlay, believed to be in California, December 2017.

Station closed temporarily in 1940, permanently in 1945.
Pre ON numbers are unofficial numbers used by the Lifeboat Enthusiasts' Society to reference early lifeboats not included on the official RNLI list.

=== Inshore lifeboats ===
On station	Op.No. (Note: Op.No. is the RNLI's Operational Number of the boat carried on the hull.)	Name	Class	Comments
1990	B-538	Lord Brotherton	B-class (Atlantic 21)	First stationed at Staithes and Runswick in 1978. At Teignmouth for just two weeks in 1990.
1990–1991	B-533	Unnamed	B-class (Atlantic 21)	First stationed at Littlestone-on-Sea in 1976.
1991–2006	B-588	Frank and Dorothy	B-class (Atlantic 21)	
2006–2024	B-809	The Two Annes	B-class (Atlantic 85)	
2013–2025	A-67	Malcolm Hawkesford I	Arancia	
2024–	B-947	Claude and Kath	B-class (Atlantic 85)	

=== Launch and recovery tractors ===
On station	Op.No.	Reg. No.	Type	Comments
1990–2022	TA21	WCL 764X	County 1184 Tractor	
2023–2024	TA21	WCL 764X	County 1184 Tractor	
2024–	TW01	XTK 150M	Talus MB-764 County	

== See also ==
- List of RNLI stations
- List of former RNLI stations
- Royal National Lifeboat Institution lifeboats
- Teignmouth Lighthouse
