= RNLB Spirit of Lowestoft =

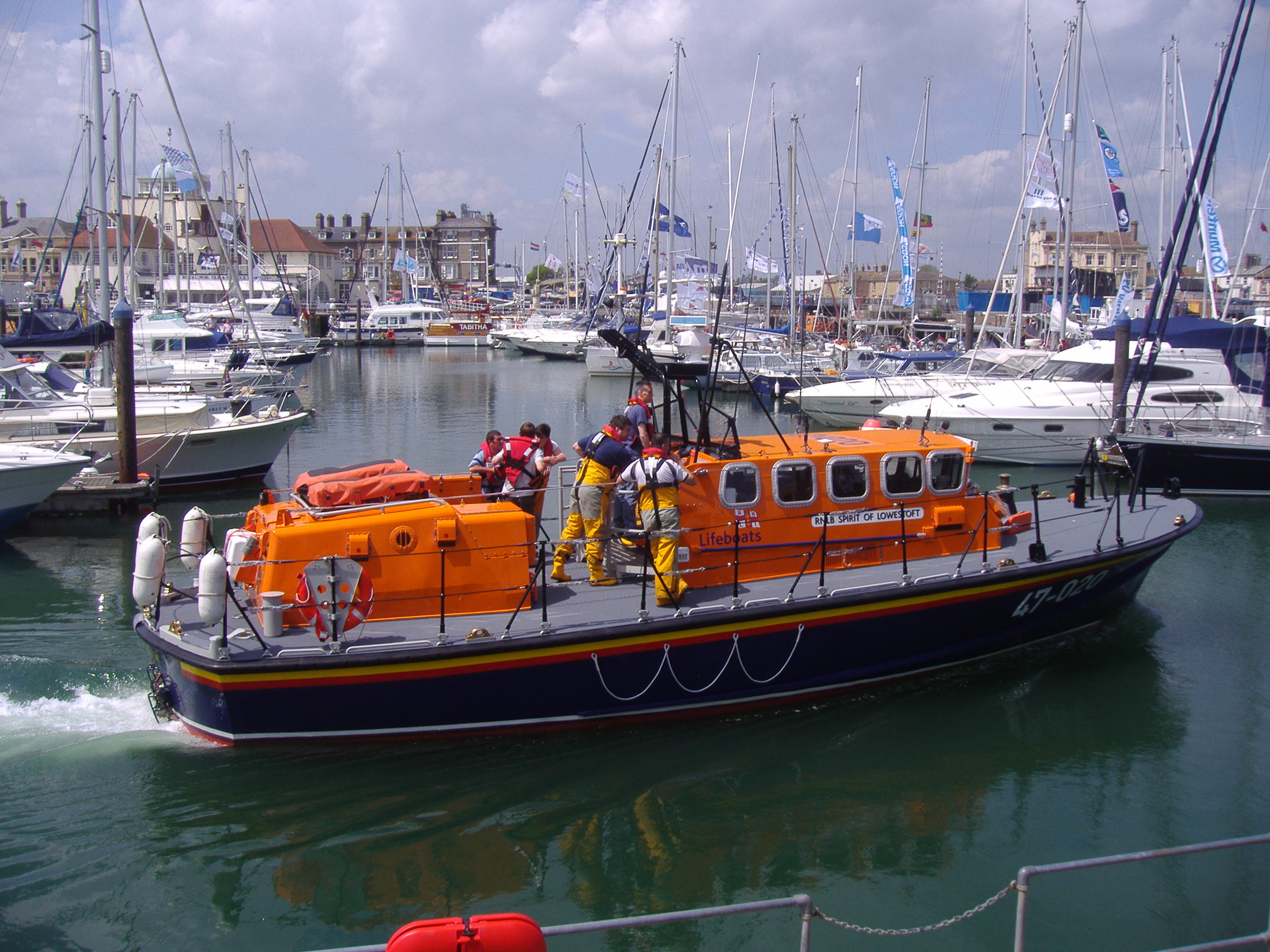
- Spirit of Lowestoft

History

British RNLI Flag
- Owner: Royal National Lifeboat Institution (RNLI)
- Builder: Fairey Marine, Cowes, Isle of Wight
- Official Number: ON 1132
- Station: Lowestoft
- Cost: £2.5 million
- Sponsored by: The Lowestoft Appeal with other gifts and legacies
- Christened: 1987
- Acquired: 1987

General characteristics
- Type: Tyne class
- Tonnage: 31.5 tonnes
- Length: 52 ft 5 in (15.98 m) overall
- Beam: 18 ft 0 in (5.49 m)
- Draught: 1.35m
- Installed power: Twin turbo Diesel engine of 1,015 bhp (757 kW) each
- Propulsion: 2 X fixed pitch 5 blade propellers
- Speed: 25 knots (46 km/h)
- Range: 10 hours at 25 knots (46 km/h)
- Capacity: 4,600 litres/1,000 gallons
- Crew: 7 crew including a doctor

RNLB Spirit of Lowestoft (ON 1132) is a Tyne-class lifeboat which was stationed at Lowestoft in the English county of Suffolk. The lifeboat began its service at the station in 1987 and was replaced by a Shannon class boat in 2014.

== Notable rescues and awards ==
On 29 August 1996, Spirit of Lowestoft was launched, along with the Aldeburgh Lifeboat Freddie Cooper (ON 1193) to assist the yacht Red House Lugger which had sent out a mayday signal during a storm. The yacht was approximately 30 miles (48 km) southeast of Lowestoft. On arrival, the lifeboats found that the P&O cargo ferry MV Norking was sheltering the yacht. The lifeboats evacuated the yacht's crew, and the Lugger was towed to Harwich, with the rescue taking around 12 hours in total. On 27 November 1996, coxswain of the Spirit of Lowestoft, John Cathpole received the RNLI bronze medal for his part in the rescue.

== Museum exhibit ==
Since 2019, Spirit of Lowestoft has been one of the lifeboats exhibited at the Chatham Historic Dockyard.
