= Southend (Cantyre) Lifeboat Station =

Former RNLI lifeboat station in Argyll and Bute, Scotland

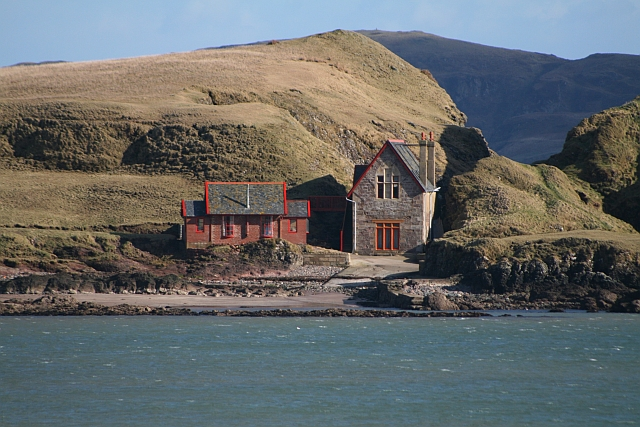
- Former Lifeboat Station at Southend, Argyll

- Southend, Argyll and Bute

General information
- Status: Closed
- Type: RNLI Lifeboat Station
- Location: Dunaverty Rock, Southend, Kintyre, Argyll and Bute, PA28 6RW, Scotland
- Coordinates: 55°18′26.9″N 5°38′43.1″W
- Opened: 1869
- Closed: 1930

Southend (Cantyre) Lifeboat Station was located in the shadow of Dunaverty Rock, overlooking Dunaverty Bay, near Southend, a village on the southern tip of the Mull of Kintyre, in the county of Argyll and Bute, on the south-west coast of Scotland.

A lifeboat was first stationed at Southend in 1869, by the Royal National Lifeboat Institution (RNLI).

Southend (Cantyre) Lifeboat Station closed in 1930.

== History ==
It was reported in the RNLI journal 'The Lifeboat' on 1 January 1870, that a new station, under the management of the Campbeltown Lifeboat Committee, had been established at the south end of Cantyre, near Dunaverty Castle, "where wrecks occasionally take place." A new boathouse had been constructed on a site granted by The Duke of Argyll, costing £461-9s, and a 32-foot self-righting 'Pulling and Sailing' (P&S) lifeboat, one with both sails and (10) oars, costing £246-2s-6d, along with its launching carriage, had been placed at the station.

An amount of £1500 was gifted to the Institution, from Mr Robert Ker, a merchant of Auchinraith, and members of his family, for the provision of a lifeboat to be stationed at Southend, Argyll, along with a boathouse, carriage, all equipment, and a sum of money for the future support of the lifeboat. This was done in memory of his 21-year-old son John Ronald Ker, who had drowned nearby on 26 October 1867. A tablet carved in Aubigny stone was placed on the front of the boathouse in his memory. At the donor's request, an additional £150 was provided for the construction of a house for the lifeboat coxswain.

A ceremony was held on 21 June 1869 for the naming of the lifeboat, which was duly named John R. Ker, after which followed the launch and demonstration of the lifeboat to the assembled crowd.

On 2 January 1875, the barque Perica of Glasgow with 15 crew aboard, was wrecked on Sanda Island, just 3 nautical miles (5.6 km) from Southend. A local farmer waded out into the surf, rescuing three men. He then put out in a small boat with three other men, and succeeding in saving a further seven men. Alexander Ritchie was awarded the RNLI Silver Medal.

In 1888, the Southend (Cantyre) lifeboat was replaced with a larger 34-foot lifeboat. As per the donor's wishes, it too was named John R. Ker (ON 160). This lifeboat was launched at 22:30 on the 17 February 1880 to the steamship State of Georgia, which had broken her shaft. Such were the conditions, it would be 05:30 the following day, before the lifeboat arrived with the vessel. The lifeboat stood by, until two steamers arrived to take the vessel in tow.

It had long been recognised, that should the conditions be such, that it would cause a vessel be blown ashore near Southend, the very same conditions would mean that launching the lifeboat would be very difficult, if not impossible. The situation was finally brought to a head in 1903, when on 27 February, the barque Argo of Fredrikstad was wrecked at Macharioch, approximately 3 miles (4.8 km) from Southend. For several hours, the crew at Southend tried in vain to get the lifeboat away, but the direction and strength of the wind and storm just pitched the boat back onto the shore every time. The Campbeltown lifeboat was called, was towed to the vessel by steam tug, veered down, nine crewmen were rescued from the rigging, and the lifeboat under tow was soon returned to Campbeltown.

The Institution immediately set about rectifying the situation. A new boathouse was constructed on pilings, under the supervision of Mr. W. T. Douglass, engineer and architect of the Institution, and included a 130-foot-long (40 m) slipway, allowing the boat to slide into the water without assistance. The works took nearly one year, completed in autumn 1904.

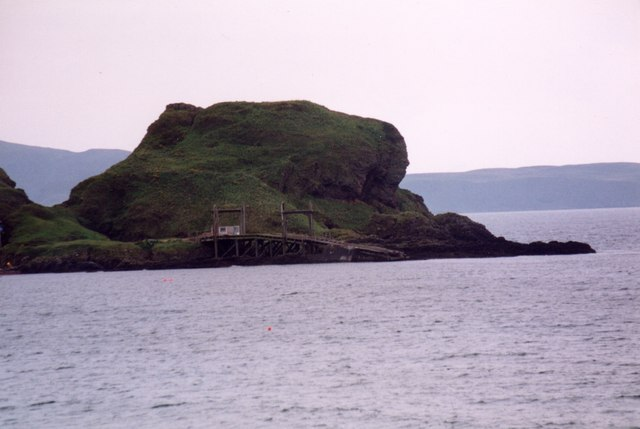
Southend (Cantyre) slipway in 1998

It had also been decided that a new boat was required, and a new 38-foot Watson-class lifeboat was sent to the station in 1904. The crew had visited other stations, and had been allowed to assess various type of lifeboat. At 15:00 on Wednesday 16 August 1905, in glorious calm weather, a double ceremony was held in front of a large crowd, who witnessed the official opening of the new boathouse, the naming ceremony of the new lifeboat, and then watched on as the lifeboat was launched down the slipway and demonstrated in the bay. As per the funds and wishes of Mr. Robert Ker, the third lifeboat at Southend (Cantyre) was once again named John R. Ker (ON 529).

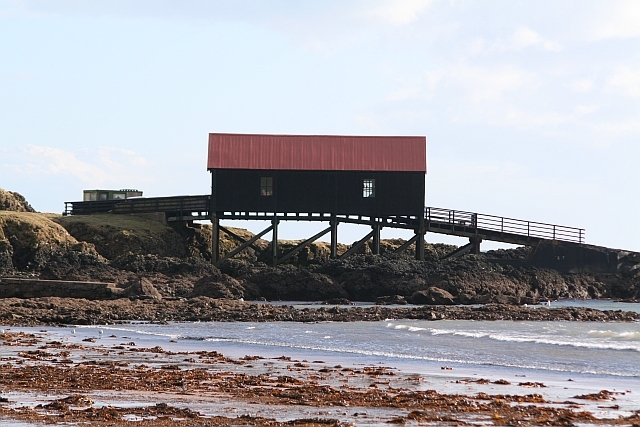
New structure built on the old slipway, 2008

Southend (Cantyre) Lifeboat Station was closed in 1930. The original comment "where wrecks occasionally take place." proved more than true. Very few services were carried out by the Southend (Cantyre) lifeboat, launching just 14 times in 61 years on service, rescuing 4 people. Archibald Mathieson, Coxswain, William Gilchrist, Second Coxswain, and William Galbraith, Bowman, each received a Certificate of Service and a pension, on the closure of the station.

The original boathouse still stands, and is currently a holiday let. The 1904 boathouse was demolished, and a new structure has been built on the original base.

The lifeboat on station at the time of closure, John R. Ker (ON 529), was sold from service in 1930, and last reported on the River Ouse in York in 1975.

== Southend (Cantyre) lifeboats ==
=== Pulling and Sailing (P&S) lifeboats ===
ON (Note: ON is the RNLI's Official Number of the boat.)	Name	Built	On station	Class	Comments
Pre-536	John R. Ker	1869	1869−1888	32-foot Prowse Self-righting (P&S)	(Note: 32-foot x 7-foot 6in (10-oared) Prowse-class self-righting (P&S) lifeboat, gift of Mr R. Ker of Auchinraith, built by Forrestt of Limehouse, London, costing £246.)
160	John R. Ker	1888	1888−1904	34-foot Self-righting (P&S)	(Note: 34-foot x 7-foot 6in (10-oared) self-righting (P&S) lifeboat, gift of Mr R. Ker of Milngavie, built by Watkins of Blackwall, London, costing £364.)
529	John R. Ker	1904	1904−1930	38-foot Watson (P&S)	(Note: 38-foot x 9-foot 4in (10-oared) Watson-class non-self-righting (P&S) lifeboat, gift of Mr R. Ker of Milngavie, built by Thames Ironworks of Blackwall, London, costing £1,100.)

Pre ON numbers are unofficial numbers used by the Lifeboat Enthusiasts' Society to reference early lifeboats not included on the official RNLI list.

== See also ==
- List of RNLI stations
- List of former RNLI stations
- Royal National Lifeboat Institution lifeboats
