= RNLB Freddie Cooper =

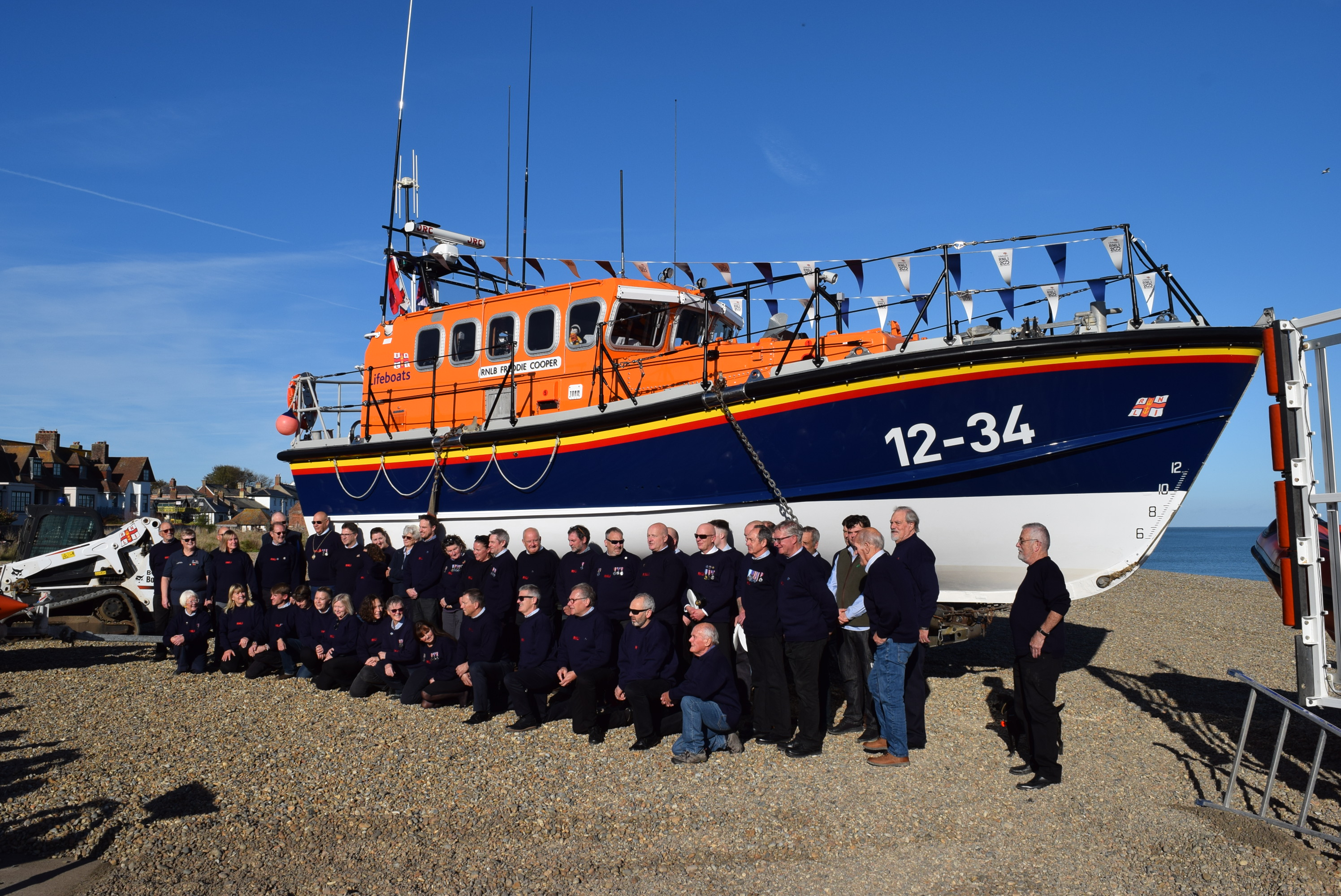
- RNLB 12-34 Freddie Cooper (ON 1193)

History

British RNLI Flag
- Owner: Royal National Lifeboat Institution (RNLI)
- Builder: Groves & Gutteridge, Cowes, Isle of Wight
- Official Number: ON 1193
- Station: Aldeburgh
- Laid down: 1992
- Launched: 1993
- Commissioned: 1993
- In service: 1993
- Out of service: 2024

General characteristics
- Class & type: Mersey
- Displacement: 14.3 tonnes
- Length: 38 ft 1 in (11.61 m) overall
- Beam: 13 ft 1 in (3.99 m)
- Draught: 2 ft 3.5 in (0.699 m)
- Depth: 3 ft 11 in (1.19 m)
- Installed power: 2 x Caterpillar 3208T marine diesel; 280hp each at 2,800rpm
- Speed: 17 kn (31 km/h)
- Range: 240 nmi (440 km)
- Complement: 43 people (Max)
- Crew: Six

RNLB Freddie Cooper (ON 1193), a Mersey-class fast carriage lifeboat. was the All-weather lifeboat formerly on station in the town of Aldeburgh in the English county of Suffolk. The Freddie Cooper has the Operational No: 12-34 and was on station from 1993 to 2024.

== Description ==
The Freddie Cooper was laid down in 1992 by Green Marine of Southampton, Hampshire. She was delivered to the station in 1993. Her hull has been constructed using a fibre-reinforced composite making her robust, strong and very light. The lifeboat is designed to self-right if capsized but only if her passenger capacity has reached 21 people. If the lifeboat's survivor compartment is fully ladened with 43 people then the lifeboat is non self-righting. Due to the nature and terrain at the Aldeburgh station, the lifeboat is launched and retrieved using a supplied carriage which gives her quick and safe access across Aldeburgh's shingle beach. The lifeboat is powered by two Caterpillar marine diesel 3208T engines. Each engine produces 285 horsepower which will push the lifeboat through the water at a top speed of 17 kn (31 km/h). Her fuel tanks hold 1,110 of diesel which give a range of 240 nmi (440 km). The lifeboats propellers are installed in tunnels which protect them when launching or in the shallow waters as is the situation at Aldeburgh.

== Service and rescues ==
=== Red House Lugger ===
On 29 August 1996, Freddie Cooper was launched, along with Lowestoft lifeboat RNLB Spirit of Lowestoft (ON 1132), to assist the yacht Red House Lugger which had sent out a mayday signal during a storm. The yacht was approximately 30 miles (48 km) southeast of Lowestoft. On arrival, the lifeboats found that the P&O cargo ferry MV Norking was sheltering the yacht. The lifeboats evacuated the yacht's crew, and the Lugger was towed to Harwich, with the rescue taking around 12 hours in total. On 27 November 1996, coxswain of the Freddie Cooper, Ian Firman, received the RNLI Bronze Medal for his part in the rescue.

=== Rose Bank ===
On Sunday 20 May 2000, the Freddie Cooper was launched to assist the small Dutch yacht Rose Bank, which was struggling in gale force 7 winds. During the search, the weather deteriorated sharply and Harwich lifeboat Fraser Flyer (Civil Service No. 43) (ON 1237) was also launched to assist. Initially reported to be seven miles east of Aldeburgh, the Rose Bank had drifted to 20 miles east of Aldeburgh by the time she was located.

The wind had escalated to gale force 11, a violent storm, and waves were up to 6 m (20 ft) high. All four Rose Bank crew members were rescued, but the lifeboats were unable to secure the yacht for towing. The drifting Rose Bank was recovered three days later by a fishing boat and was towed into Ramsgate in Kent. Coxswain Ian Firman was awarded a second-service clasp to his RNLI bronze medal.

=== Service and rescues 2000 to date ===
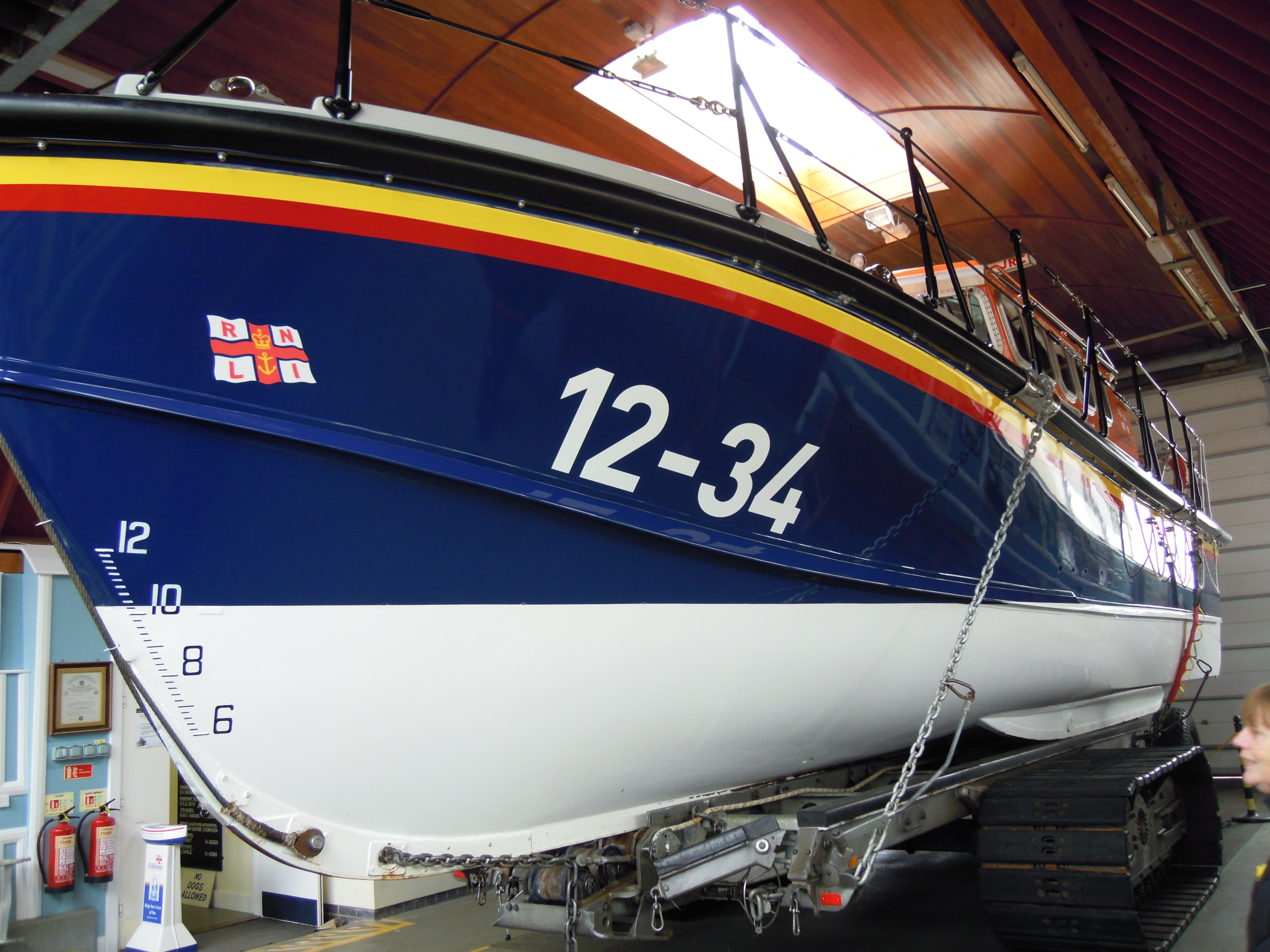

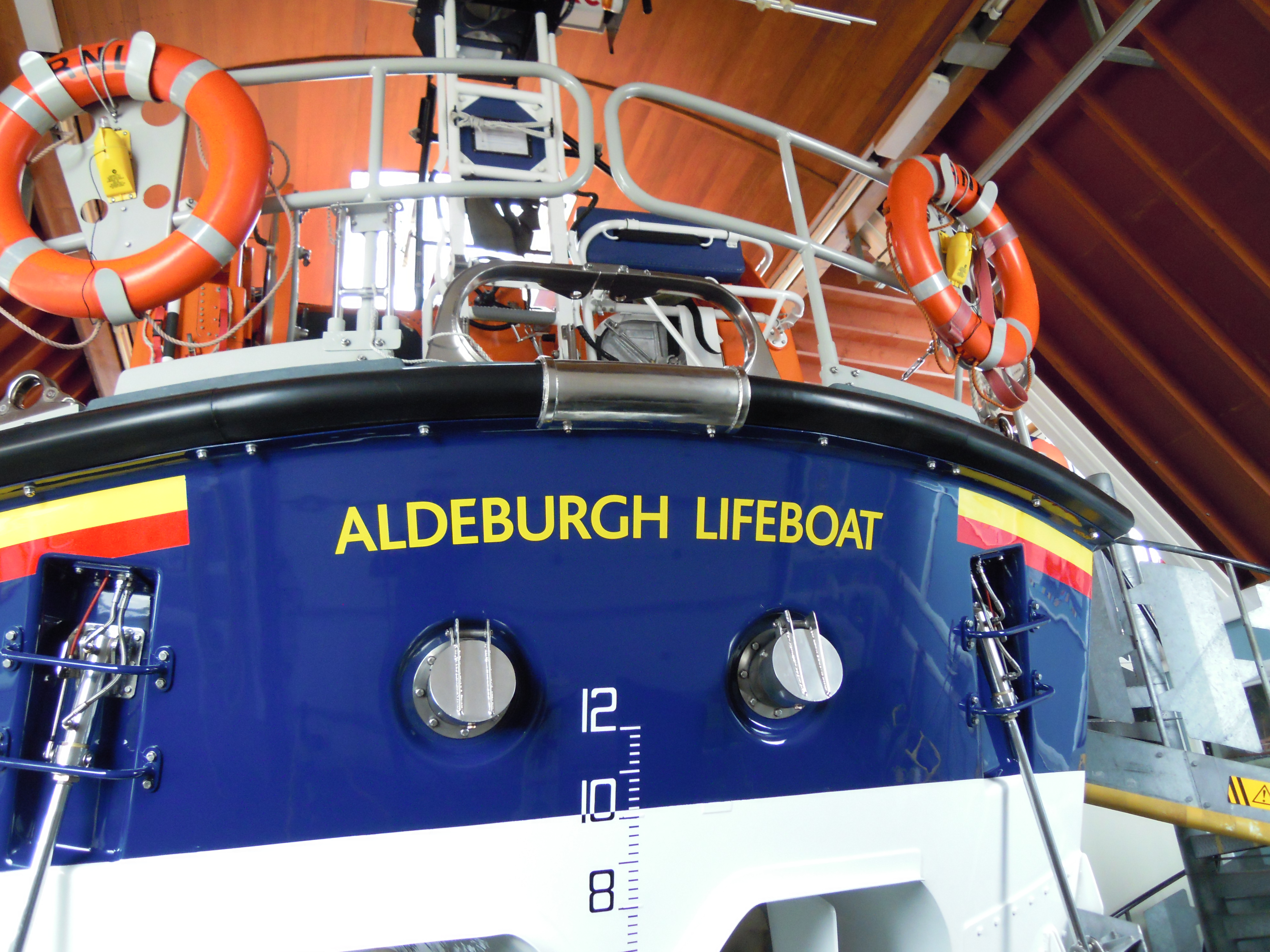

Freddie Cooper
Date	Casualty	Lives saved
2009
10 March	Windsurfer blown out to sea, Search area but nothing found	
2010
20 May	Fishing Boat with engine failure, towed back to shore	
17 July	Yacht in difficulties, Towed back to shore	
1 September	Called to ditched light Aircraft, Helicopter rescued the 2 crew, Search and retrieved small amount of wreckage	
9 September	Barge with steering difficulties, towed to Harwich	
9 September	Yacht with broken rigging, Stood by	
16 September	Yacht stuck on sandbank with broken rudder, Escorted yacht to safety	
22 October	Yacht with un-well crewman, Crewman taken of by Harwich Lifeboat, escorted yacht to safety	
2011
Relieved by RNLB Bingo Lifeline (ON 1184)
8 May	42 ft Motor boat stranded, towed into Southwold harbour	
2 August	Stranded Boat at the mouth of the River Alde, escorted to safety	
28 August	Yacht run aground, Stood by	
September 20	Yacht sinking, Pump water out of the boat, towed the yacht to Southwold Harbour	2
9 November	Fishing Boat, Towed to shore	
2012
11 January	Fishing Boat with engine failure, Stood down after restart	
3 March	Fishing Boat with engine failure, Towed to Shore	
25 April	Yacht in Difficulty, Towed to Lowestoft	
15 May	Dutch Motorboat with engine failure, towed to shore	
31 May	Motorboat taking on water, Motorboat pump out and retrieved	3
8 June	Dutch Yacht with broken rudder and taking on water, towed to shore	3
12 July	25 ft Yacht run aground, Rescued 1 man, returned to refloat the yacht	1
12 July	40 ft vessel with engine failure, towed to shore	
17 July	Hazardous object in the water, two large storage containers, removed by lifeboat	
27 July	26 ft fishing vessel, Towed in and stood by	
8 August	26 ft Fishing vessel with engine problem, towed to shore	
28 August	Yacht run aground, stood by	
30 August	Yacht with engine failure, Towed into Lowestoft	
31 August	Search for a vessel with distress beacon activated, Vessel found but safe and well	
9 October	Fishing vessel with engine failure, Towed to safety	
11 November	Object reported in the sea, Searched the area, nothing found	
2013
4 May	Yacht run aground on the beach, re-floated and towed to safety	
26 May	133 swimmers in charity race, All accounted for lifeboat stood down	
13 August	54 ft vessel with engine failure, Towed to Harwich	
19 August	Abandoned stolen dinghy at anchor, Search carried out, no one found, Stood down	
