= Machrihanish Lifeboat Station =

Former RNLI lifeboat station in Argyll and Bute, Scotland

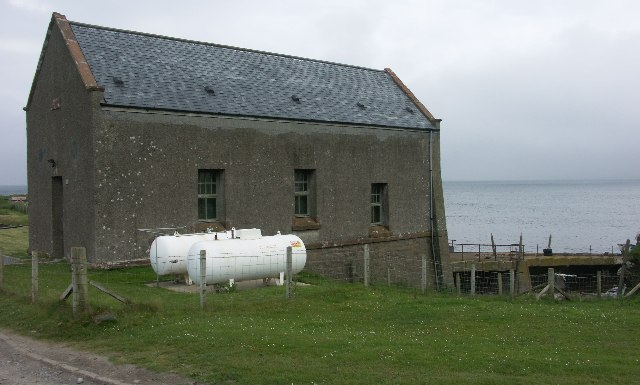
- Former Lifeboat Station, Machrihanish

- Machrihanish, Argyll and Bute

General information
- Status: Closed
- Type: RNLI Lifeboat Station
- Location: Machrihanish Lifeboat Station, Machrihanish, Argyll and Bute, PA28 6PZ, Scotland
- Coordinates: 55°25′23.5″N 5°44′52.4″W
- Opened: 1912
- Closed: 1930

Machrihanish Lifeboat Station was located in Machrihanish, a small village on the west coast of the Kintyre peninsular, 6 miles (9.7 km) west of the town of Campbeltown, in Argyll and Bute, Scotland.

A lifeboat station was established at Machrihanish by the Royal National Lifeboat Institution (RNLI) in 1912.

Following the placement of a motor-powered lifeboat at Campbeltown, it was decided that the station was no longer required. Machrihanish Lifeboat Station closed in 1930.

== History ==
On 29 December 1908, the steam trawler Albany (FD-82) was on her return trip to Fleetwood after fishing off the west coast of Scotland, when she was caught in a blizzard off the Kintyre peninsular, and ran aground 150 yards (140 m) off shore at Tangytavil, near Westport, 5 miles (8.0 km) north of Machrihanish. Battered by the storm and huge waves, the ship's boat was washed away. The windows of the wheelhouse were smashed, leaving little protection for the 10 crewmen. Three other trawlers stood by for some time, but unable to get close, or offer and help, they eventually departed, leaving the Albany's crew to their fate.

Only the previous day, on 28 December 1908, the Campbeltown lifeboat had been badly damaged on a call, and could not be used. It is doubtful whether the lifeboat could have been brought the 6 miles (9.7 km) miles overland in the blizzard conditions, and a sea journey would have been maybe 30 nautical miles (56 km).

The Campbeltown lifeboat crew still set out to the wreck, to try to effect a rescue, battling the winter conditions, but finding roads impassible with snow. Meanwhile, locals did what they could to get a line to the boat, but without success. Eventually, after nearly three days aboard the wreck, the local men managed to get a line ashore, and one by one, the 10 crewmen were pulled through the waves to the shore and safety.

As a result of this incident, it was decided that a lifeboat should be placed on the west side of the Kintyre peninsular. When required, the lifeboat would be launched by the crew from Campbeltown. A boathouse and slipway were built at Machrihanish, and a 35-foot self righting 'pulling and sailing' (P&S) lifeboat, one with oars and sails, was constructed by Thames Ironworks of Blackwall, London. A grand inauguration ceremony was held on 19 September 1912, and the boat was named Henry Finlay (ON 618).

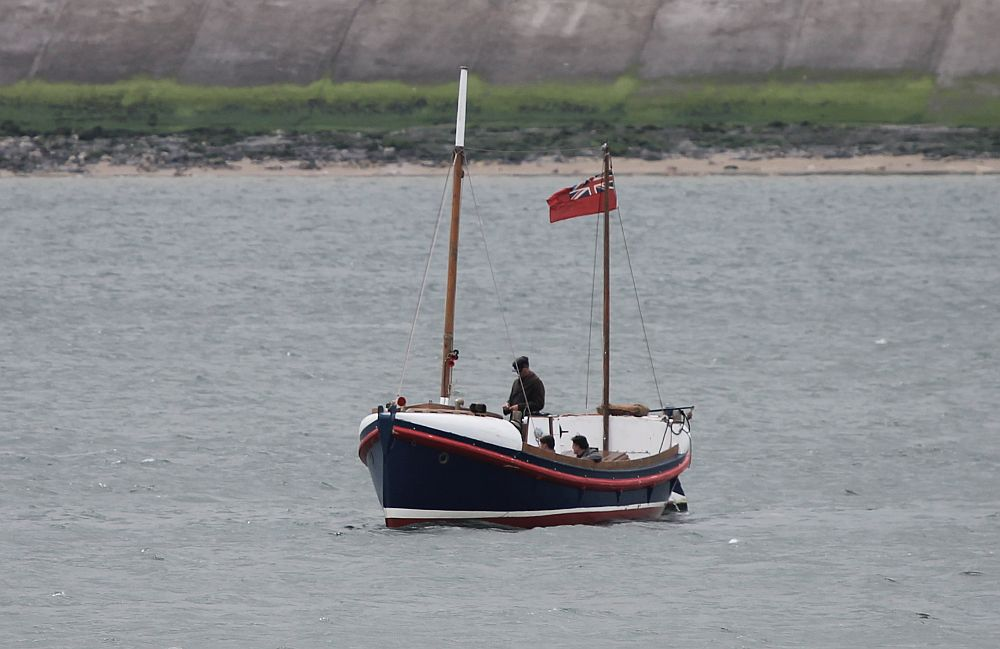
RNLB Henry Finlay (ON 618)

In an ideal world, a lifeboat should never be required. But an unused asset is often transferred to somewhere more useful. This would be the fate to befall the Machrihanish lifeboat, for in 18 years, the lifeboat was never required, and never launched on service. In 1929, a 51-foot motor-powered Barnett-class lifeboat was placed at Campbeltown. The Henry Finlay (ON 618) was withdrawn, and the Machrihanish Lifeboat Station was closed in 1930.

The Henry Finlay was towed to Ardrossan, and then transported by rail to Teignmouth, where she would serve for another nine years, until that station also closed in 1940. She would remain in store at Teignmouth as a reserve lifeboat, for the duration of the Second World War, being sold for £200 in 1945. Fully restored in 2008, she was used in the Warner Bros. film Dunkirk in 2017, and it is believed she was subsequently transported to the United States, still in the ownership of Warner Bros.

The building still remains as a boathouse / store.

== Machrihanish lifeboat ==
ON (Note: ON is the RNLI's Official Number of the boat.)	Name	Built	On station	Class	Comments
618	Henry Finlay	1911	1912−1930	35-foot Self-righting (P&S)	(Note: 35-foot x 8-foot 6in (10-oared) self-righting (P&S), legacy of Mr H. Finlay of Highbury, built by Thames Ironworks of Blackwall, London, costing £923.)

== See also ==
- List of RNLI stations
- List of former RNLI stations
- Royal National Lifeboat Institution lifeboats
