= Campbeltown Lifeboat Station =

RNLI Lifeboat station in Argyll, Scotland

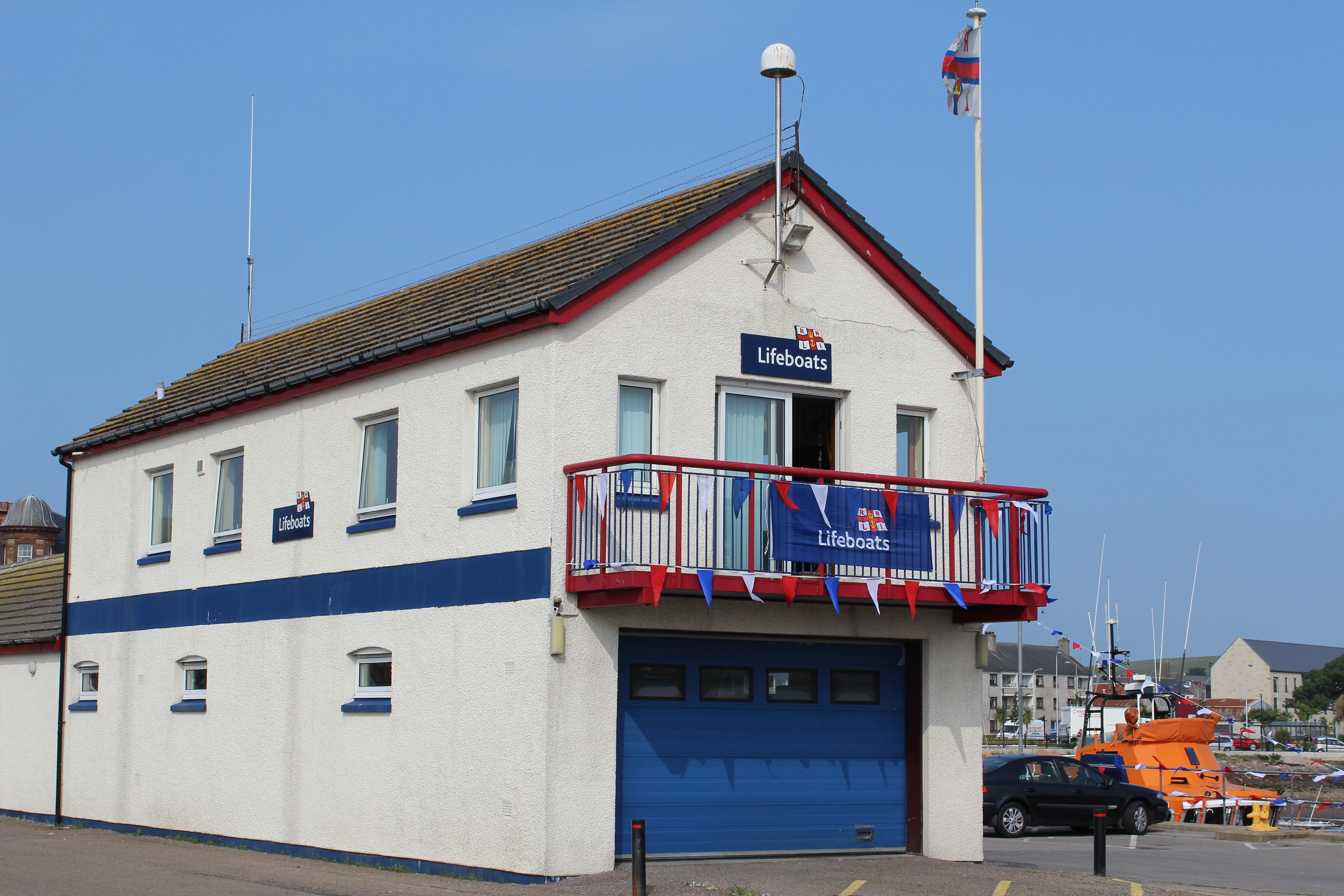
- Campbeltown Lifeboat Station in 2013

- Location within Argyll and Bute

General information
- Type: Lifeboat station
- Location: The Captain Ian Weir Crawford Boathouse, The Old Quay, Campbeltown, Argyll and Bute, PA28 6ED, United Kingdom
- Coordinates: 55.425194°N 5.602056°W
- Opened: First station 1861; Current building 1996; 30 years ago
- Owner: Royal National Lifeboat Institution

Website
- Campbeltown RNLI Lifeboat Station

Campbeltown Lifeboat Station can be found on the Old Quay in Campbeltown, a town and former royal burgh at the head of Campbeltown Loch, on the east coast of the Kintyre Peninsula, in Argyll and Bute, Scotland.

A lifeboat station was established at Campbeltown by the Royal National Lifeboat Institution (RNLI) in 1861.

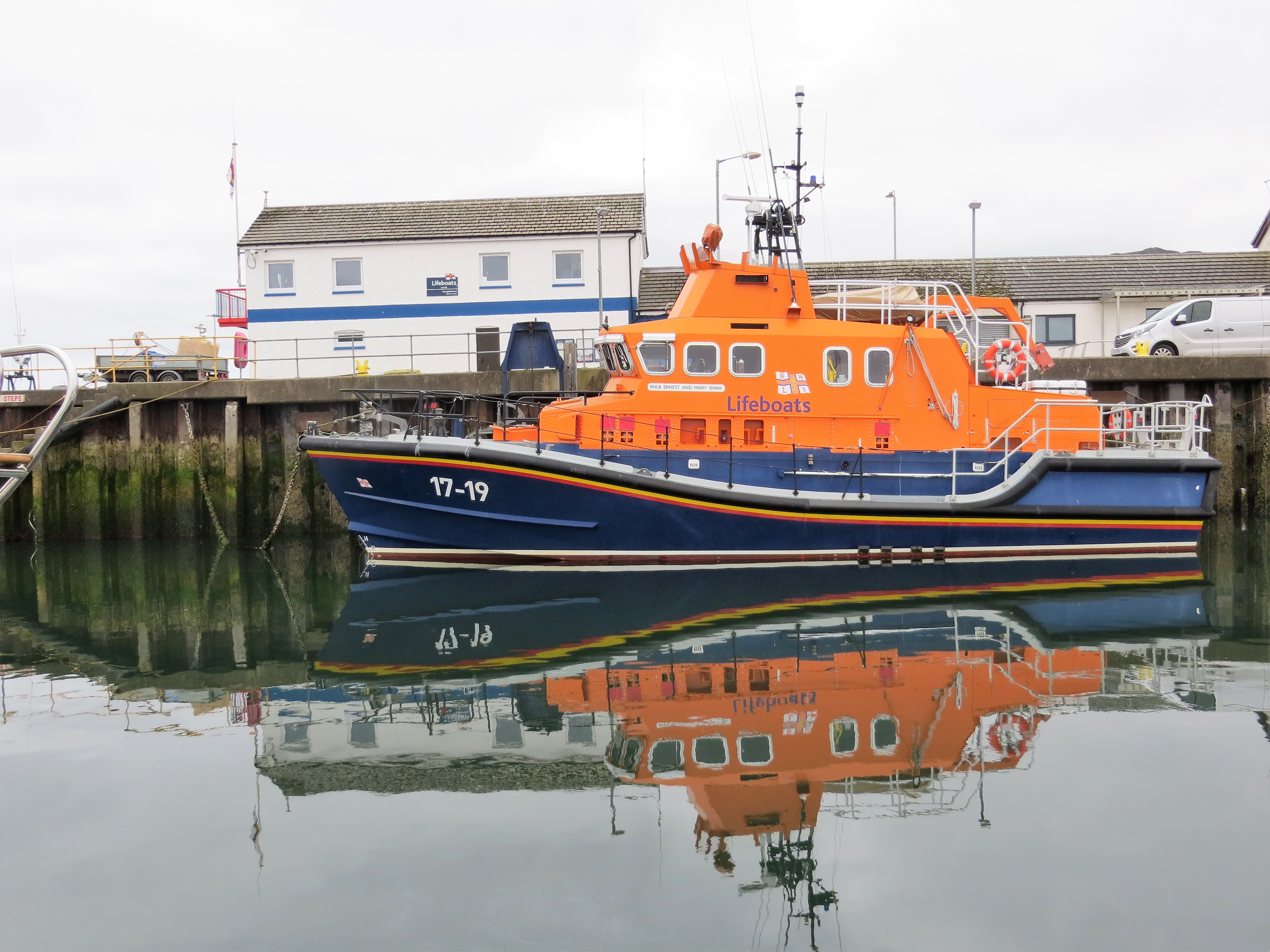
Severn-class All-weather lifeboat 17-19 Ernest and Mary Shaw (ON 1241)

The station currently operates a Severn-class All-weather lifeboat, 17-19 Ernest and Mary Shaw (ON 1241), on station since 1999, and the much smaller D-class (IB1) Inshore lifeboat, D-870 Leonard Mills (D-870), on station since 2022.

== History ==
At a meeting of the RNLI committee of management on Thursday 1 November 1860, a letter from Lockhart Thomson SSC of Edinburgh advised that Lady Murray wished to present the cost of a lifeboat establishment to the Institution, not to exceed £520, to be stationed on the Mull of Cantyre or west coast of Scotland, and named in memory of her late husband.

Supporting letters were also received from The Duke of Argyll, from Messrs. Watson Jon & Co., agents for Lloyd's at Campbeltown, and from Capt. John Ward, R.N., Inspector of Life-boats. Capt. Ward had recently visited Cantyre, and recommended that the boat-house should be built at Campbeltown, being a central position, from where the boat may be transported on her carriage to various parts of the coast. A lifeboat station for Campbeltown was agreed.

A 30-foot (9.1 m) Peake-class self-righting 'Pulling and Sailing' (P&S) life-boat, one with sails and six oars, single-banked, was built by Forrestt of Limehouse, and sent to the station from London in June 1861, along with a carriage by Robinson. Both lifeboat and carriage cost £431. A boathouse was constructed at the end of New Quay Street, at a cost of £158.

Numerous wrecks occur on the south and west coasts of the peninsula of Cantyre; and as the neighbourhood is traversed by good roads, this life-boat will be available for the preservation of life and property over a considerable extent of coast. There is a large fishing population at Campbeltown, so that a good crew for the boat can always be depended on.

— The Life-boat, vol. IV, issue 42, page 492, 1 October 1861

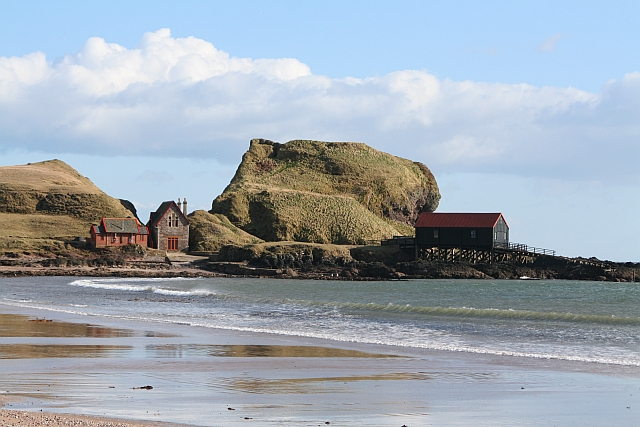
Southend (Cantyre) lifeboat Station

In 1869, a second station was established at the southern tip of the peninsula, 10 miles (16 km) to the south of Campbeltown, at Dunaverty Bay, "where wrecks occasionally take place." The station was managed by the Campbeltown lifeboat committee, and used the same crew, who could be transported there much more easily and quicker by road, than by rowing.

Over the next 30 years, no fewer than three new lifeboats would be placed at Campbeltown, each one slightly larger than the last. In 1876, the 32 ft (9.8 m) Princess Louise, costing £282, was funded by the Princess Louise lifeboat fund. The second, the 34 ft (10 m) Mary Adelaide Harrison (ON 148), costing £396, arrived on station in 1888.

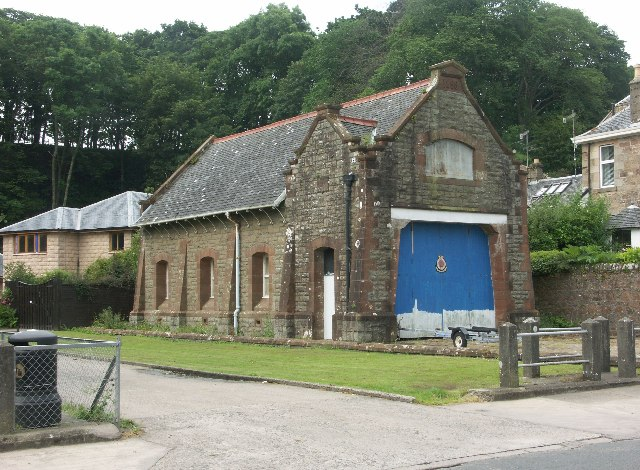
The 1898 Campbeltown lifeboat house

When the third one arrived in 1898, a 35 ft (11 m) Liverpool-class lifeboat James Stevens No. 2, costing £538, and one of 20 lifeboats funded from the legacy of property developer James Stevens of Birmingham, it was decided to construct a new boathouse.

The boathouse was built on Kilkerran Road, approximately 1/2 mi (0.80 km) to the south of the town, at a cost of £885. Coordinates:55°25′05.5″N 5°35′39.2″W

The old station was demolished the following year, with the site handed back to the land owner. The old site is now occupied by the Campbeltown Ferry Terminal.

On 28 December 1908, the Campbeltown lifeboat was badly damaged, dashed on the deck of the schooner Janes of Larne. A lifeboat crew member was washed overboard, but was recovered. The lifeboat was forced to return to station without effecting a rescue from the schooner, but brought ashore the seven crew of a small boat, including master mariner Capt. Duncan Martin, who also launched to the assistance of the schooner, but were wrecked in the process. Two of the three crew of the Janes were rescued the following day by Capt. Martin in another small boat, for which he was awarded the RNLI Silver Medal.

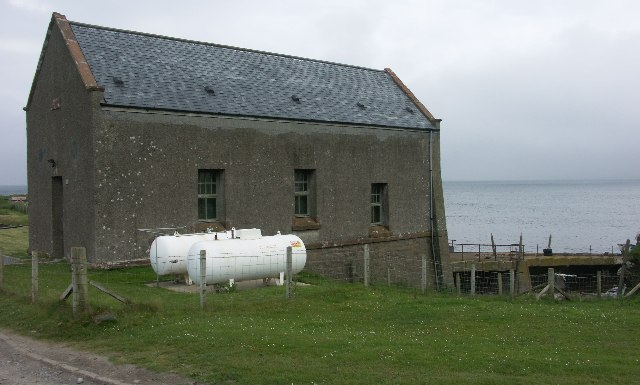
Machrihanish lifeboat station

The following day, the steam trawler Albany (FD-82) of Fleetwood was caught in a blizzard off the west side of the Kintyre peninsular, and ran aground 150 yards (140 m) at Tangytavil, near Westport, 5 miles (8.0 km) north of Machrihanish. A sea journey of approximately 30 nautical miles (56 km) was out of the question, even if the lifeboat had been in good condition. Even though the Campbeltown lifeboat crew set out to the wreck, to try to effect a rescue without their damaged lifeboat, the 6 miles (9.7 km) miles overland in blizzard conditions proved impossible, and they were beaten by the conditions. After nearly three days aboard the wreck, local men managed to get a line aboard, and one by one, the 10 crewmen were pulled through the waves to the shore and safety. As a result, it was decided to establish a second satellite lifeboat station, at Machrihanish, which opened in 1912.

Meanwhile, a smaller No. 2 lifeboat, a Whale Boat, Richard Cresswell (ON 481), previously on station at Poolbeg, was placed at the Campbeltown station in 1910, and in 1912, Campbeltown would receive one of the early motor-powered lifeboats, a 43-foot Watson-class William MacPherson (ON 620), with a single 60-hp Tylor engine.

Major changes would come seventeen years later in 1929, following the arrival of a larger 51-foot Barnett-class lifeboat City of Glasgow II (ON 899), which cost £10,198, and featured twin 60-hp Weyburn CE6 engines, giving greater range and speed. Both satellite stations would be closed. The lifeboat at Machrihanish had never been launched on service in 18 years, and the boat at Southend (Cantyre) had launched just 14 times in 61 years, rescuing just four people. The Campbeltown No.2 boat was also withdrawn in 1931, it too having never been launched on service.

== 1990s onwards ==
In 1964, in response to an increasing amount of water-based leisure activity, the RNLI placed 25 small fast Inshore lifeboats around the country. These were easily launched with just a few people, ideal to respond quickly to local emergencies.

Over time, the Inshore lifeboats began to be established at the All-weather lifeboat stations, and on 29 May 1992, the D-class (EA16) Bertha (D-399) arrived on station from the relief fleet, for evaluation over the summer season. A second boat from the relief fleet was sent in 1993, and on 31 January 1994, the Inshore lifeboat was made a permanent asset. The station received their own new boat, Spirit of Kintyre (D-455) on 26 March 1994.

Construction of a new boathouse was started on the Old Quay, completed in 1996. The building has a garage on the lower floor, to house the Inshore lifeboat and launch vehicle, with crew and other facilities on the upper floor. The building was funded from the bequest of the late Captain Ian Weir Crawford, and at a double ceremony on 13 July 1996, the boathouse was formally named in his honour by his sister, Mrs McGugan. Following a service of dedication, the Inshore lifeboat was formally handed to the Campbeltown branch, and named Spirit of Kintyre (D-455).

The new Severn-class All-weather lifeboat went on service at Campbeltown on Sun 30 May 1999, replacing the Arun-class lifeboat 52-12 Walter and Margaret Couper (ON 1059), which had served the station for 20 years. The new lifeboat, built in 1998, featured twin Caterpillar 3412TA engines, delivering a top speed of 25 knots, and cost £1.75m. The boat was funded from the estate of the late Ernest Shaw, and at a ceremony on 28 August 1999, his widow Mary formally named the lifeboat 17-19 Ernest and Mary Shaw (ON 1241).

On 6 August 2010, Spirit of Kintyre (D-455) was replaced by the new D-class (IB1) class Inshore lifeboat Alastair Greenless (D-737). This boat was in turn replaced on 17 October 2022, with the arrival of Leonard Mills (D-870). The new boat was one of two D-class lifeboats funded from the legacy of the late Mrs Dorothy Mills, and was named in memory of her late husband, Leonard (Len). The second lifeboat was named Dorothy Mills (D-881), and joined the RNLI relief fleet in 2023.

== Notable service ==
The Norwegian barque Argo was wrecked near Macharioch on the morning of 27 February 1903. The lifeboat James Stevens No. 2 put out into the gale, and was towed close to the wreck by a steam tug. Two of the Argo crew went ashore to get help, but drowned when they tried to return. The coxswain took the lifeboat through shallow rocks, rescuing the remaining nine crew just before the wreck broke up, with the tug then towing the lifeboat back to Campbeltown. Each of the lifeboat crew were given a medal and diploma by the Norwegian government.

A service during World War II resulted in awards to the Campbeltown lifeboat crew. For saving 44 crew from the Dutch mv Mobeka on 19 January 1942, Coxswain James Thomson received the Medal of the Order of the British Empire, and was awarded the RNLI Silver Medal. The RNLI Bronze Medal was awarded to Second Coxswain Duncan Newlands, and each of the crew.

Coxswain Duncan Newlands received his second bronze award, for a service on 16 March 1946. This time the lifeboat, which had damaged its rudder and suffered an engine breakdown, saved 54 people from the American ss Byron Darnton, after it ran aground on Sanda Island. Duncan Black, the lifeboat mechanic, was accorded 'The Thanks of the Institution inscribed on Vellum'.

The Campbeltown lifeboat was launched on the night of 8 March 1957, when the SS Gracehill ran aground on Sanda Island in fog. Visibility was less than 50 yards (46 m) but two fishing boats were able to help the lifeboat navigate, as they could see it on their radar, and gave instructions by radio. The 10 crew of the Gracehill had taken to the ship's boats by the time the lifeboat reached the scene, and were sheltering behind the wreck. They were taken aboard the lifeboat, which then made its way slowly back to port through the fog, arriving nearly seven hours it had set out. The 'Thanks of the Institution inscribed on Vellum' was accorded to Duncan Newlands.

The trawler Erlo Hills, with 14 people on board, broke down and was blown ashore in a Force 9 storm on 2 October 1981. After the Campbeltown lifeboat was at sea, it was discovered that the casualty was actually near Rathlin Island in Northern Ireland. This is in the area of the Portrush lifeboat, but it was decided to allow the Scottish lifeboat to complete its mission. The Erlo Hills was towed away from the shore but the crew were reluctant to abandon ship. They did eventually transfer to the lifeboat, a difficult thing in waves 10 feet (3.0 m) high, and were taken to Campbeltown. Coxswain/Mechanic Alexander Gilchrist was awarded the RNLI silver medal.

The 'Thanks of the Institution inscribed on Vellum' was also accorded to Coxswain/Mechanic Alexander Gilchrist, for rescuing a crew of three from the John Hannah VC in a Force 6 gale on 30 September 1988. The same award was made to Coxswain Jim McPhee, for leading the rescue of the single person, trapped on the Gille Brighde after it capsized on 29 March 1995. A 'Framed Letter of Thanks signed by the Chairman of the Institution' was given to Acting Coxswain John D. Stewart for his leadership, when the lifeboat went to aid the yacht Ra, lost in thick fog on 6 July 1991.

Coxswain John D. Stewart received the RNLI Bronze medal and other awards, for a difficult rescue on the night of 29 November 2001. The fishing boat Sincerity suffered engine failure and hit rocks, 77 yards (70 m) off Ardlamont Point, and 30 miles (48 km) from Campbeltown. The two people on board tried to launch their life raft but the wind tore it away. Weather conditions were so bad that the SAR Helicopter was forced to withdraw, and it was too rough to launch the Atlantic 75 Inshore lifeboats from the closer stations at Tighnabruaich and Arran. Once the Campbeltown All-weather lifeboat arrived on scene, it took more than an hour to effect the rescue, in the dark and amid the high waves.

== Station honours ==
The following are awards made at Campbeltown:

- Medal of the Order of the British Empire
  James Thomson, Coxswain – 1942
- RNLI Silver Medal
  Capt. Duncan Martin, Master Mariner – 1909
  James Thomson, Coxswain – 1942
  Alexander Gilchrist, Coxswain/Mechanic – 1982
- Silver Medal, awarded by the Royal Society of Arts
  Capt. S. Hamilton Nixon, Master of the Ceol Mor – 1982
- RNLI Bronze Medal
  Duncan Newlands, Second Coxswain – 1942
  Duncan Black, Bowman – 1942
  John Hubert Lister, Reserve Mechanic – 1942
  James Lang, crew member – 1942
  Joseph McGeachy, crew member – 1942
  Duncan McLean, crew member – 1942
  Neil Speed, DSM, crew member – 1942
  Duncan Newlands, Coxswain – 1946 (Second-Service clasp)
  John D. Stewart, Coxswain – 2001
- Medal and Diploma, awarded by the Norwegian Government
  Each of the 16 Campbeltown lifeboat crew – 1903
- The Maud Smith Award 2000
  (for the bravest act of lifesaving during the year by a member of a lifeboat crew)
  John D. Stewart, Coxswain – 2001
- Lady Swaythling Trophy for outstanding seamanship in 2000
  awarded by The Shipwrecked Fishermen and Mariners' Royal Benevolent Society
  John D. Stewart, Coxswain – 2001
- 'The Thanks of the Institution inscribed on Vellum'
  Duncan Black, Mechanic – 1946
  Duncan Newlands, Coxswain – 1957
  The Campbeltown lifeboat crew – 1982
  Capt. S. Hamilton Nixon, Master of the Ceol Mor – 1982
  Alexander Gilchrist, Coxswain/Mechanic – 1988
  Jim McPhee, Coxswain – 1995
- Vellum Service Certificates.
  The Campbeltown lifeboat crew – 1995
- 'A Framed Letter of Thanks signed by the Chairman of the Institution'
  John D. Stewart, Acting Coxswain – 1991
- Inscribed Binocular Glass,
  "for his valuable co-operation on Life-boat service on the 28-29th December, 1908"
  J. A. Gardiner, Honorary Secretary of the Campbeltown and Southend Branch

== Campbeltown lifeboats ==
=== Pulling and Sailing (P&S) lifeboats ===
==== Campbeltown / Campbeltown No.1 ====
On station	ON (Note: ON is the RNLI's Official Number of the boat.)	Name	Built	Class	Comments
1861–1876	Pre-374	Lord Murray	1861	30-foot Peake self-righting (P&S)	(Note: 30 ft 0 in (9.14 m) x 7 ft 0 in (2.13 m) (6-oared) Peake-class self-righting (P&S) lifeboat, gift of Lady Murray of Edinburgh, built by Forrestt of Limehouse, London, costing £153. Modified to 10-oared in 1865.); Sawn into three parts and sold in 1876.
1876–1888	Pre-607	Princess Louise	1876	32-foot Prowse self-righting (P&S)	(Note: 32 ft 0 in (9.75 m) x 7 ft 6 in (2.29 m) (10-oared) Prowse-class self-righting (P&S) lifeboat, gift of the Princess Louise LB fund, built by Woolfe of Shadwell, London, costing £282.); Sold in 1888.
1888–1898	148	Mary Adelaide Harrison	1888	34-foot self-righting (P&S)	(Note: 34 ft 0 in (10.36 m) x 7 ft 6 in (2.29 m) (10-oared) self-righting (P&S) lifeboat, gift of Mrs H. Harrison of Liverpool, built by D. and W. Henderson and Company of Partick, costing £396.); Transferred to St Annes for use as a boarding boat.
1898–1912	413	James Stevens No. 2	1898	35-foot Liverpool (P&S)	(Note: 35 ft 0 in (10.67 m) x 10 ft 0 in (3.05 m) (12-oared) Liverpool-class non-self-righting (P&S) lifeboat, legacy of Mr J. Stevens of Birmingham, built by Reynolds of Lowestoft, costing £538.); Transferred to the Relief fleet. Later at Hilbre Island

Pre ON numbers are unofficial numbers used by the Lifeboat Enthusiasts' Society to reference early lifeboats not included on the official RNLI list.

==== Campbeltown No.2 ====
On station	ON	Name	Built	Class	Comments
1910–1931	481	Richard Cresswell	1902	29-foot 1in Whaleboat	(Note: 29 ft 1 in (8.86 m) x 6 ft 7 in (2.01 m) (6-oared) non-self-righting Whale-boat, legacy of Mrs E. A. C. Cresswell of Egham, built by J. Atkinson, costing £392.); Previously at Poolbeg, it was only used as a boarding boat at Campbeltown.

=== Motor lifeboats ===
On station	ON	Op.No. (Note: Op.No. is the RNLI's Operational Number of the boat carried on the hull.)	Name	Built	Class	Comments
1912–1929	620	–	William MacPherson	1937	43-foot Watson	Transferred to Aldeburgh.
1929–1953	720	–	City of Glasgow	1929	51-foot Barnett (Stromness-class)	Transferred to the Relief fleet.
1953–1979	899	–	City of Glasgow II	1953	52-foot Barnett (Mk.I)	
1979–1999	1059	52-12	Walter and Margaret Couper	1979	Arun	Transferred to the Relief fleet.
1999–	1241	17-19	Ernest and Mary Shaw	1999	Severn	

More post-service details can be found on the respective lifeboat class pages.

=== Inshore lifeboats ===
On station	Op.No.	Name	Class	Comments
1992	D-399	Bertha	D-class (EA16)	
1993	D-403	City of Peterborough	D-class (EA16)	
1994–2001	D-455	Spirit of Kintyre	D-class (EA16)	
2001–2010	D-571	Three Brothers	D-class (EA16)	
2010–2022	D-737	Alistair Greenless	D-class (IB1)	
2022–	D-870	Leonard Mills	D-class (IB1)	

== See also ==
- List of RNLI stations
- List of former RNLI stations
- Royal National Lifeboat Institution lifeboats
