= Aldeburgh Lifeboat Station =

RNLI lifeboat station in Suffolk, England

Aldeburgh lifeboat station

- Aldeburgh lifeboat station.

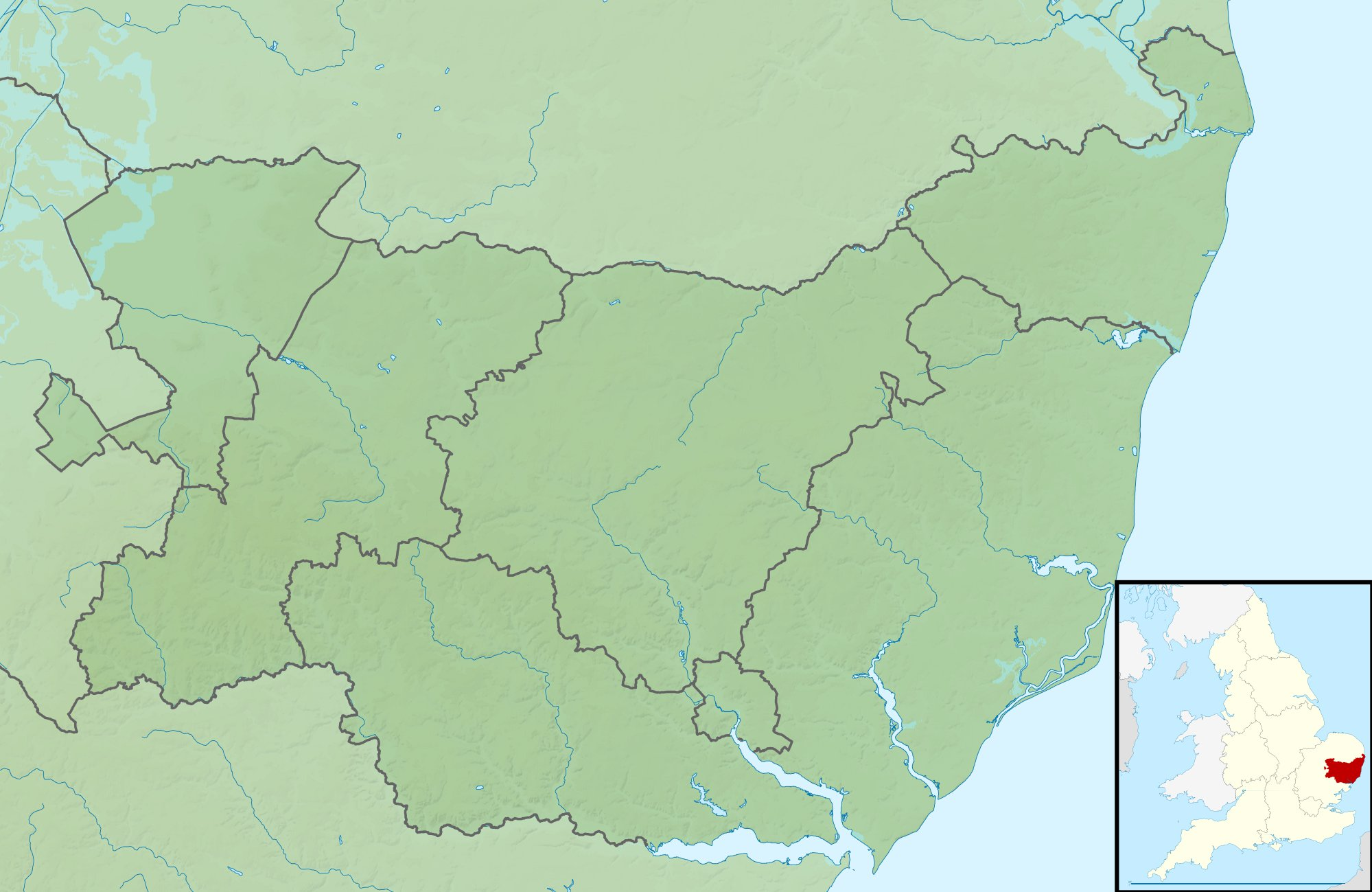
- Location within Suffolk
- Alternative names: Aldborough Lifeboat Station

General information
- Type: RNLI Lifeboat Station
- Location: Crag Path, Aldeburgh, Suffolk IP15 5BP, England
- Coordinates: 52°9′11″N 1°36′10″E
- Opened: 1851
- Owner: Royal National Lifeboat Institution

Website
- Aldeburgh RNLI Lifeboat Station

Aldeburgh Lifeboat Station is located on Crag Path in Aldeburgh, a seaside resort approximately 24 miles (39 km) north-east of Ipswich, in the county of Suffolk, on the east coast of England.

A lifeboat station was first established at Aldeburgh by the Suffolk Humane Society in 1851, when an existing lifeboat, provided by the Royal National Institute for the Preservation of Life from Shipwreck (RNIPLS), was relocated from Sizewell Gap. The RNIPLS became the Royal National Lifeboat Institution (RNLI) in 1854, with management of the station being transferred to them in 1855.

The station currently operates the B-class (Atlantic 85) Inshore lifeboat Ralph (B-949), on station since 2025, and the smaller D-class (IB1) Inshore lifeboat Susan Scott (D-808), on station since 2017. The station covers the coast between Harwich to the south, and Southwold to the North.

== History ==
The Suffolk Association for Saving the Lives of Shipwrecked Seamen, later known as the Suffolk Humane Society, placed the 24 ft (7.3 m) lifeboat Grafton at Sizewell Gap in 1826, crewed by men from Aldeburgh. The Sizewell station closed in 1851, with the boat relocated to a new station at Aldeburgh, where the crew were based, and where more crew were available. A boathouse costing £58 was constructed to the south of the town, at Slaughden Quay.

A new 32 ft (9.8 m) unnamed self-righting 'Pulling and Sailing' (P&S) lifeboat, one with sails and 12 oars, was stationed at Aldeburgh in 1853.

On 3 November 1855, lifeboat man Thomas Cable was carrying out duties as an 'extra-man' at the coastguard station at Orford, when the brig Vesta (Vestor) was driven ashore. Quickly on scene, he was soon in the water, tied with a rope, and rescued a young Swedish man. However, setting out for a second time, the rope broke, and he was swept underneath the vessel, which then rolled onto him, killing him instantly.

Just four year later, on 21 December 1859, the lifeboat was launched to the aid of the brig Unity of Whitby, but was not required. Heading home, the lifeboat capsized. The lifeboat quickly self-righted, and most of the crew regained the boat, but three men were lost. Along with Philip Francis Green and John Pearce, the third man was Thomas Cable, the father of the man killed in 1855. The lifeboat was subsequently modified in 1860, lengthened to 39 ft (12 m), at a cost of £179-19-1d, and was named Pasco in 1867, after Capt. Montague G. C. Pasco, RN, who collected £451 for the RNLI.

In 1864, a new lifeboat house was erected, at a cost of £226, as the original site was required for building purposes.

Pasco was replaced just four years later in 1870, when the boat was found to be unfit for service. The coxswain had high praise for the new boat, 40 ft (12 m) long and 10 ft (3.0 m) wide, which had proved its stability during trials, requiring 57 men standing on one side of the boat, to bring the gunwale to water level. The lifeboat was entirely funded by Mrs Hounsfield of Sheffield, who had gifted the sum of £700 to the Institution. At a ceremony in October 1870, in the presence of a large crowd, the lifeboat was named George Hounsfield, in memory of her husband.

Twenty years after the first move, the lifeboat house had to be moved for a second time, due to coastal erosion.

An anonymous gift to the Institution provided two new lifeboats in 1890. The first was sent to Upgang in the North Riding of Yorkshire, and the second to Aldeburgh. As per the request of the donor, each was named after the station they were to serve. (This would be the first RNLI reference to the name "Aldeburgh", but not the last to the incorrect "Aldborough", used since 1851.)

Aldeburgh (ON 304) would serve just nine years. Launched on service on 7 December 1899, the lifeboat capsized, with the loss of seven crew:– See below.

A relief lifeboat was initially placed at the station in the wake of the disaster, and in 1902, the Bolton (ON 352) was temporarily transferred from Kessingland, the station there being closed while the boat was away. A permanent boat arrived in 1903, the 46 ft (14 m) City of Winchester (ON 482). The lifeboat, built by Thames Ironworks, of Blackwall, London, and costing £2,640, was provided by the Winchester Lifeboat Fund, established through the efforts of the mayor, Mr W. H. Forder.

Just two years later, in 1905, the Institution established a second station at Aldeburgh, when the 38 ft (12 m) Liverpool-class P&S lifeboat Edward Z Dresden (ON 545) was placed on station.

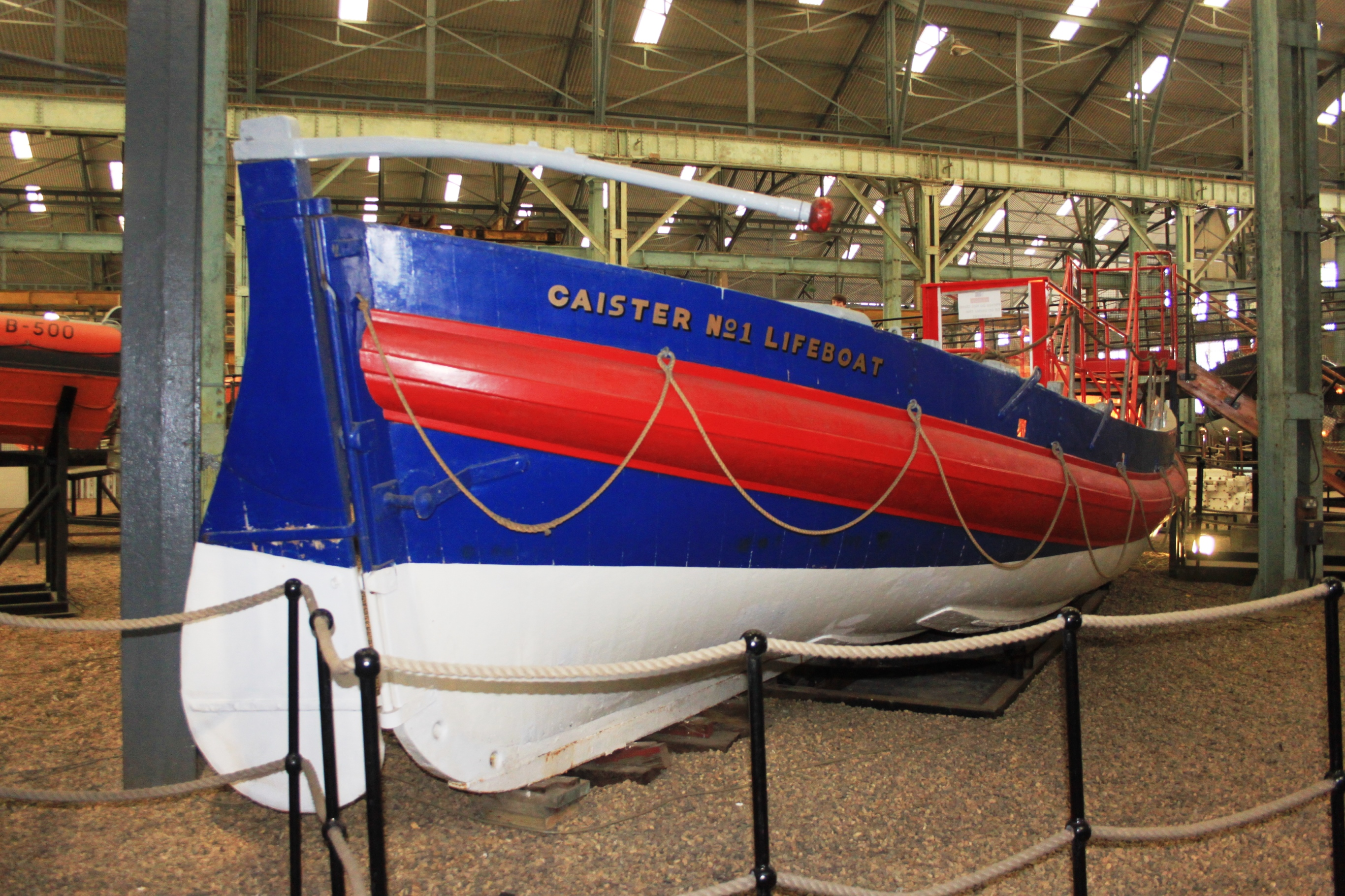
Former Aldeburgh lifeboat James Leath (ON 607), now on display in the RNLI Heritage Collection at Chatham Historic Dockyard

Unusually, it would be the No. 2 station to be the first to receive a motor-powered lifeboat, the 43-foot Watson-class lifeboat William Macpherson (ON 620), in 1930. The lifeboat was only on station for one year, suggesting that it was used for evaluation purposes after the Edward Z Dresden was withdrawn. In 1931, the 41ft Beach Type Motor Lifeboat Abdy Beauclerk (ON 751) was placed at the No. 1 station. The No.2 station reverted to a 'pulling and sailing' lifeboat, the 42 ft (13 m) Norfolk and Suffolk-class lifeboat James Leath (ON 607), previously at Caister.

Bound for Newcastle on 10 September 1939, the oil tanker Magdapur of Liverpool was sunk off Aldeburgh by German military forces. Abdy Beauclerk was launched at 15:37. 74 men (reported as 18 white men and 56 Lascars) were rescued, all covered from head to foot in black oil. The rescue had been the first by a lifeboat during World War II. Arriving back at Aldeburgh at 17:30, the boat was cleaned of blood and oil, refuelled, and was ready for service at 20:00. Additional monetary rewards were made to the crew, in respect of their clothes being damaged by oil.

After the No. 1 lifeboat Abdy Beauclerk returned from exercise at around 10:00 on 2 November 1955, she was being prepared for service, when a securing chain broke, and the lifeboat started to launch by itself. 16-year-old John Sharman, son of the mechanic, managed to hang on, and hauled himself on board, steering the boat seaward. However, unable to drop anchor, and with no power, the boat drifted to the shore. The No. 2 lifeboat Lucy Lavers was launched, and with Sharman able to make fast a tow line, the boat was recovered at 14:00. John Sharman was presented with a Letter of Appreciation, and a monetary reward, from the Committee of Management.

=== 1977 onwards ===
A small D-class (RFD PB16) Inshore lifeboat was placed at the station in July 1977. Just one month later, with the crew still undergoing training, and after difficulties trying to launch the Watson-class lifeboat in gale-force conditions, Helm of the Inshore lifeboat (D-111) John Marjoram was awarded the RNLI Bronze Medal, in recognition of his seamanship, courage and determination, for saving a young boy from the yacht Spreety on 17 August 1977.

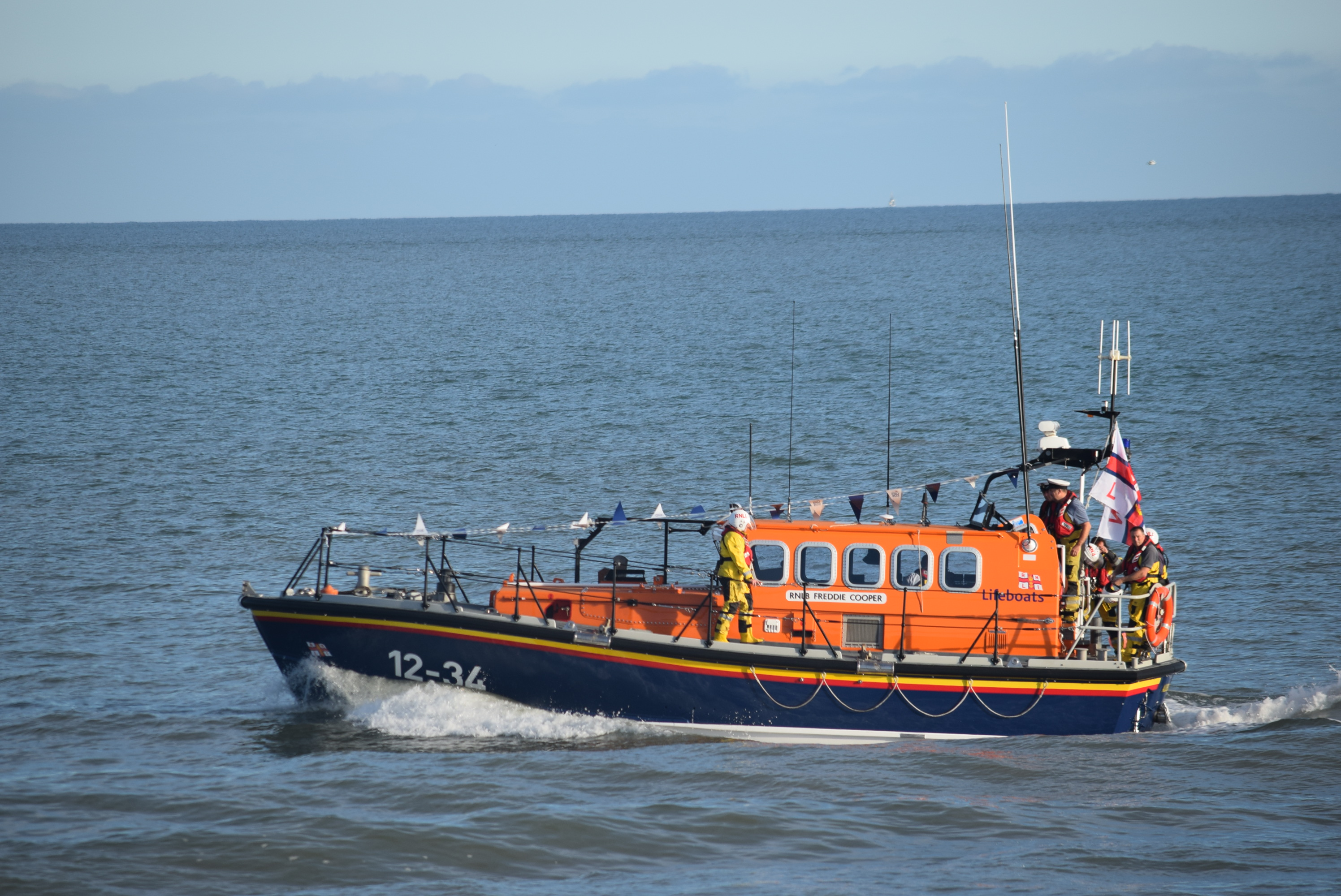
Aldeburgh Mersey-class lifeboat 12-34 Freddie Cooper

The All-weather Mersey-class lifeboat 12-34 RNLB Freddie Cooper (ON 1193) was placed on station in November 1993. The 12 metres (39 ft) self-righting lifeboat, costing £674,776, was powered by two 285-hp turbo-charged Caterpillar 3208T diesel engines, capable of 16 knots, with a range of 140 nautical miles. The boat was primarily funded using a bequest to the RNLI from the late Mrs Winifred Cooper, in memory of her husband Freddie, a former director and secretary of the East Midland Allied Press and a managing director of Northamptonshire Newspaper Ltd. The couple regularly took holidays at Aldeburgh. H.R.H. The Duke of Kent attended Aldeburgh on 31 May 1994, to name the new lifeboat Freddie Cooper.

The current lifeboat station was built in 1994, to replace a smaller older one on the same site. For the first time, protective cover was provided, for both the station lifeboat and the Talus MB-H launch tractor. Incorporated into the design is a public viewing platform. The station has showers and toilet facilities for the crew, and a heated store for their foul weather suits. There are also further equipment storage rooms. This new boathouse was one of eight so named 'Penza' boathouses, built using the bequest of Mrs Eugenie Boucher. A native of Penza in Russia, she left £4 million to the RNLI when she died in 1992, specifically for the construction of new boathouses.

Following a Mayday call, lifeboats from both Lowestoft and Aldeburgh were launched into storm force conditions on 29 August 1996, to the yacht Red House Lugger, 30 miles (48 km) south-east of Lowestoft, bound for the Netherlands with six people aboard. Shane Coleman was put aboard the yacht, and with 3 people safely aboard each lifeboat, the boat was towed to Harwich. Freddie Cooper was at sea for 12 hours, at one point being rolled on her side, with the port windows under water. Coxswain John Catchpole from Lowestoft and Coxswain/mechanic Ian Firman were each awarded the RNLI Bronze Medal.

Nearly four years later, on 28 May 2000, Freddie Cooper was launched to the aid of another yacht, Rosebank. After searching for two hours in terrible conditions, the yacht was found 22 miles (35 km) from shore. For the "courage, firm and decisive leadership, and sound seamanship", during the rescue of the crew of four, Ian Firman was awarded a Second-service clasp to his bronze medal.

In 2007, Aldeburgh received the new D-class (IB1) lifeboat Christine (D-673). This boat was funded by the bequest of Florence Winifred Kemp, in memory of her daughter.

Christine was replaced with a new D-class (IB1) Inshore boat in 2017, and was named Susan Scott (D-808) at a ceremony on Saturday 10 June 2017.

The RNLI had announced in 2016, that Aldeburgh would be getting a new Shannon-class lifeboat, to replace the Mersey-class lifeboat, due in 2021. In July 2023, the RNLI announced that the Mersey-class All-weather lifeboat (ALB) at Aldeburgh would be replaced by an B-class (Atlantic 85) Inshore lifeboat (ILB).

On 14 October 2024, Mersey-class lifeboat, 12-34 Freddie Cooper (ON 1193), was withdrawn to the relief fleet, replaced by the B-class (Atlantic 85) Inshore lifeboat Howard Bell (B-899).

== 1899 Aldeburgh lifeboat disaster ==
On 7 December 1899, the lifeboat Aldeburgh (ON 304) was launched to reports of a vessel aground on Shipwash Sands. Amidst a raging gale and extremely heavy seas, the lifeboat was savagely struck by two huge waves in quick succession, causing her to capsize and hurling her 18-man crew into the tumultuous waters.

Unable to right itself, the lifeboat was driven bottom upwards onto the shore with six crewmen trapped underneath. Those who had escaped injury tried frantically to free their trapped crew mates, but with the boat weighing over 13 tonnes, and the tide rushing in, it proved to be an impossible challenge. Three hours passed until a hole could be smashed through the upturned hull, but it was too late. Tragically, all six men - John Butcher, Charles Crisp, Thomas Morris, Walter George Ward, Herbert William Downing, and James Miller Ward - had drowned. Another member of the crew, Allan Arthur Easter, would succumb to injuries sustained in the disaster three weeks later. It remains one of the gravest tragedies in the history of the RNLI.

A relief fund was started by the local community to support the bereft families and ensure a fitting permanent memorial would be raised to remember the self-sacrifice of those who perished in the service of others. Accordingly, a marble monument was placed in the churchyard of St Peter and St Paul's Church in Aldeburgh, where all seven lifeboatmen were laid to rest in a single plot, each with their own cross-shaped marker stone that both faces the main memorial and looks out to sea. A copper memorial tablet was also placed inside the church.

On December 7th 1899, in response to signals of distress, a crew of 18 brave men manned the lifeboat "Aldeburgh" which was speedily launched in the teeth of an easterly gale and a heavy rolling sea. At duties call to rescue others with their own lives in their hands, these brave men went afloat, when alas! the boat capsizing seven of them met their end and lie buried here. By a large fund promptly raised to provide for those suddenly bereft, as well as by the monument, fellow townsmen and fellow countrymen near and far paid tribute to an example of noble self-forgetfulness.

— Inscription on the marble memorial in the churchyard

For his bravery and dogged determination in rescuing two of his comrades, Coxwain Charles Ward was awarded a silver medal by the RNLI in 1900 - his second silver medal for Gallantry.

Among the 11 crewmen to survive the disaster was Augustus Mann, who attributed his lucky escape to the three acorns he had been carrying in his pocket for good luck. Preserved with varnish and kept in a glass-fronted box, those same acorns have been carried onboard Aldeburgh's lifeboats ever since. Until her retirement in 2024, they could be found mounted inside the wheelhouse of the lifeboat Freddie Cooper. True to the superstition, whenever the station gets a relief boat, the acorns - and the luck they bring - are dutifully transferred over.

Memorial plaque in Aldeburgh church commemorating the 1899 lifeboat disaster

Memorial in Aldeburgh churchyard commemorating the 1899 lifeboat disaster (front)

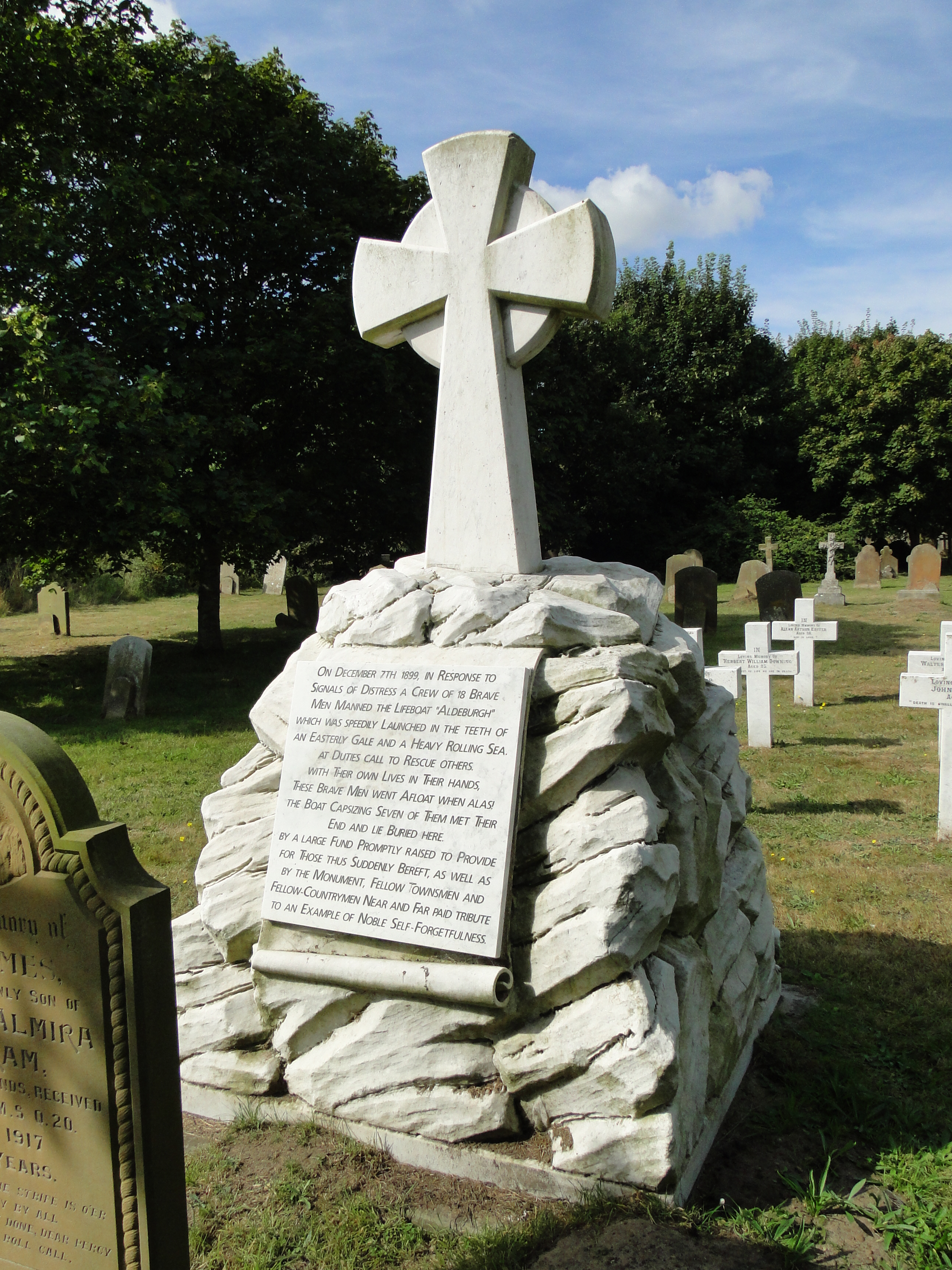
Memorial in Aldeburgh churchyard commemorating the 1899 lifeboat disaster (rear)

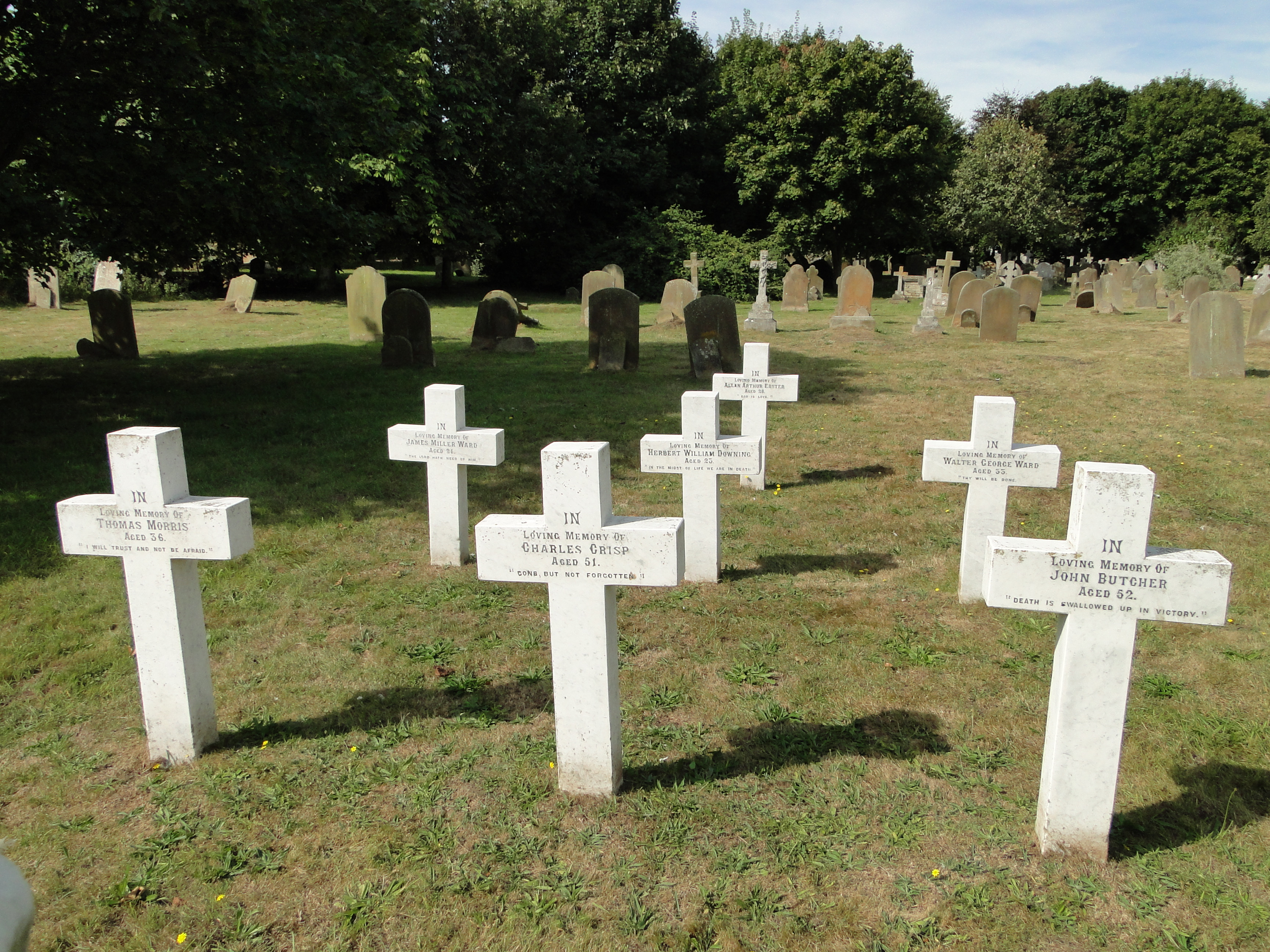
Graves in Aldeburgh churchyard of the seven crewmen killed in the 1899 lifeboat disaster

== Station honours ==
The following are awards made at Aldeburgh:

- RNIPLS Silver Medal
  Joseph Foster, Boatman, H.M. Coastguard, Sizewell Gap – 1824
  Henry Hutchinson, Chief Officer, H.M. Coastguard, Orford Ness Lighthouse – 1825
  Mr William Smith, fisherman – 1828
  Mr Simon Fisher, Master of the Smack Alert – 1840
- RNLI Silver Medal
  James Cable, Coxswain – 1891
  William Mann, Second Coxswain – 1891
  James Cable, Coxswain – 1893 (Second-service clasp)
  Charles Edward Ward, Bowman – 1894
  Charles Edward Ward, Bowman – 1900 (Second-service clasp)
  James Cable, Coxswain – 1900 (Third-service clasp)
- RNLI Bronze Medal
  George Chatten, Coxswain – 1938
  Reuben Wood, Coxswain – 1972
  John Marjoram, Helm – 1977
  Ian Firman, Coxswain/Mechanic – 1996
  Ian Firman, Coxswain/Mechanic – 2000 (Second-service clasp)
- The Thanks of the Institution inscribed on Vellum
  William Burrell, crew member – 1953
  Nigel Saint, Motor Mechanic – 1972
  Shane Coleman, Second Coxswain – 1996
- A Framed Letter of Thanks signed by the Chairman of the Institution
  Reuben Wood, Coxswain – 1977
  Lee Firman, Coxswain – 2004
  David Cook, crewman – 2004
- Binocular glass
  W. J. Osborne, Honorary Secretary for 25 years – 1886
- Letter of appreciation and a monetary reward from the Committee of Management
  John Sharman (16) – 1955
- Medals awarded by the Norwegian Government
  Aldeburgh Lifeboat Crew – 1892
- Silver cup from the Imperial Government of Russia
  James Cable, Coxswain – 1895
- Monetary Award from the Imperial Government of Russia
  Aldeburgh Lifeboat Crew – 1895
- Silver Watch from The German Emperor
  Coxswain – 1903
  Second coxswain – 1903
  Bowman – 1903
- Monetary Award from The German Emperor
  Aldeburgh Lifeboat Crew – 1903
- Member, Order of the British Empire (MBE)
  Lee Firman – 2017NYH
- British Empire Medal
  William Victor Burrell – 1953
  Nigel Anthony Saint, Motor Mechanic – 1985NYH

== Roll of honour ==
In memory of those lost whilst serving at Aldeburgh:

- Killed whilst attempting to rescue the crew of the Swedish brig Vesta, on 3 November 1855
  Thomas Cable Jr.
- Lost when the lifeboat capsized, 21 December 1859
  Thomas Cable Sr.
  Philip Francis Green
  John Pearce
- Died of a burst blood vessel, hauling the lifeboat after service, 11 November 1893
  Ernest Butcher (38)
- Lost when the lifeboat Aldeburgh (ON 304) capsized on service, 7 December 1899
  John Pearce Butcher (52)
  Charles Alfred Crisp (51)
  Herbert William Downing (23)
  Allen Arthur Easter (28)
  Thomas Morris (36)
  Walter George Ward (33)
  James Miller Ward jr. (21)

== Sizewell Gap lifeboats ==
ON (Note: ON is the RNLI's Official Number of the boat.)	Name	Built	On station	Class	Comments
Pre-118	Grafton	1826	1826–1851	24-foot Plenty non-self-righting	(Note: 24 ft 0 in (7.32 m) x 8 ft 0 in (2.44 m) (8/10-oared) Plenty-class self-righting (P&S) lifeboat, built by William Plenty of Newbury, Berkshire, costing £168.); Transferred to Aldeburgh in 1851.

Pre ON numbers are unofficial numbers used by the Lifeboat Enthusiasts' Society to reference early lifeboats not included on the official RNLI list.

== Aldeburgh lifeboats ==
=== No. 1 Station ===
==== Pulling and Sailing (P&S) lifeboats ====
ON	Name	Built	On station	Class	Comments
Pre-118	Grafton	1826	1851–1853	24-foot Plenty non-self-righting	Previously at Sizewell. Transferred to Thorpeness.
Pre-261	Unnamed	1853	1853–1866	32-foot Peake self-righting (P&S)	(Note: 32 ft 0 in (9.75 m) x 8 ft 6 in (2.59 m) (12-oared) Peake-class self-righting (P&S) lifeboat, built by Forrestt of Limehouse, London, costing £161.); Capsized 1859. Lengthened to 39-feet in 1860. Renamed Pasco in 1866.
Pre-261	Pasco	1853	1866–1870	39-foot Peake self-righting (P&S)	(Note: 39 ft 0 in (11.89 m) x 8 ft 6 in (2.59 m) (12-oared) Peake-class self-righting (P&S) lifeboat, funded by a collection via Capt. M. Pasco, RN.); Sold in 1870.
Pre-551	George Hounsfield	1870	1870–1890	40-foot self-righting (P&S)	(Note: 40 ft 0 in (12.19 m) x 10 ft 5 in (3.18 m) (12-oared) self-righting (P&S) lifeboat, gift of Mrs M. Hounsfield of Sheffield, built by Forrestt of Limehouse, London, costing £435.); Sold 1890, and used as a store on the beach until 1931.
304	Aldeburgh	1890	1890–1899	46-foot Norfolk and Suffolk (P&S)	Capsized 7 December 1899 with the loss of eight crew. Subsequently, broken up.
270	Reserve No. 1	1889	1899–1902	44-foot Norfolk and Suffolk (P&S)	Relief fleet lifeboat. Previously Margaret at Winterton.
352	Bolton	1893	1902	43-foot Norfolk and Suffolk (P&S)	On loan from Kessingland.
482	City of Winchester	1902	1902–1928	46-foot Norfolk and Suffolk (P&S)	
629	Hugh Taylor	1912	1929–1931	34-foot Norfolk and Suffolk 'Surf-Boat'	Previously at Great Yarmouth and Gorleston and Pakefield. Transferred to Kessingland.

==== Motor lifeboats ====
ON	Op.No. (Note: Op.No. is the RNLI's Operational Number of the boat carried on the hull.)	Name	Built	On station	Class	Comments
751	–	Abdy Beauclerk	1931	1931–1958	41-foot Beach Type	
946	–	Alfred and Patience Gottwald	1958	1959–1979	42-foot Watson	
948	–	Charles Dibdin (Civil Service No.32)	1959	1979–1982	42-foot Watson	Lifeboat from the Relief fleet, first deployed at Walmer.
1068	37-40	James Cable	1982	1982–1993	Rother	Last displacement hull boat on station
1193	12-34	Freddie Cooper	1992	1993–2024	Mersey	

All-weather lifeboat withdrawn, 14 October 2024
More post-service details can be found on the respective lifeboat class pages.

=== No. 2 Station ===
ON	Name	Built	On station	Class	Comments
545	Edward Z. Dresden	1905	1905–1929	38-foot Liverpool (P&S)	
620	William Macpherson	1912	1930	43-foot Watson	First motor lifeboat at station. Previously at Campbeltown. Transferred to Pwllheli.
607	James Leath	1910	1930–1936	42-foot Norfolk and Suffolk (P&S)	Previously at Caister and Pakefield.
665	Baltic	1916	1936–1940	38-foot Liverpool (P&S)	Previously at Wells-next-the-Sea. Transferred to the Relief fleet.
832	Lucy Lavers	1940	1940–1959	Liverpool	Transferred to the Relief fleet. Later at Hastings.

No.2 Station closed, 1959

=== Inshore lifeboats ===
==== D class ====
Op. No.	Name	On station	Class	Comments
D-111	Unnamed	1977–1980	D-class (RFD PB16)	
D-270	Unnamed	1980–1988	D-class (RFD PB16)	
D-376	Unnamed	1988–1997	D-class (EA16)	
D-520	Bob Savage	1997–2007	D-class (EA16)	
D-673	Christine	2007–2017	D-class (IB1)	
D-808	Susan Scott	2017–	D-class (IB1)	

==== B class ====
Op.No.	Name	On station	Class	Comments
B-899	Howard Bell	2024–2025	B-class (Atlantic 85)	Officially on service, 14 October 2024
B-949	Ralph	2025–	B-class (Atlantic 85)	

=== Launch and recovery tractors ===
Op.No.	Reg.No.	Type	On station	Comments
T66	XYP 400	Fowler Challenger III	1975	
T67	YLD 792	Fowler Challenger III	1985–1987	
T85	SEL 394R	Talus MBC Case 1150B	1987–1993	
T116	K920 DUJ	Talus MB-H Crawler	1993–2005	
T115	K499 AUX	Talus MB-H Crawler	2005–2021	
T102	E387 VAW	Talus MB-H Crawler	2021–	

== Gallery ==
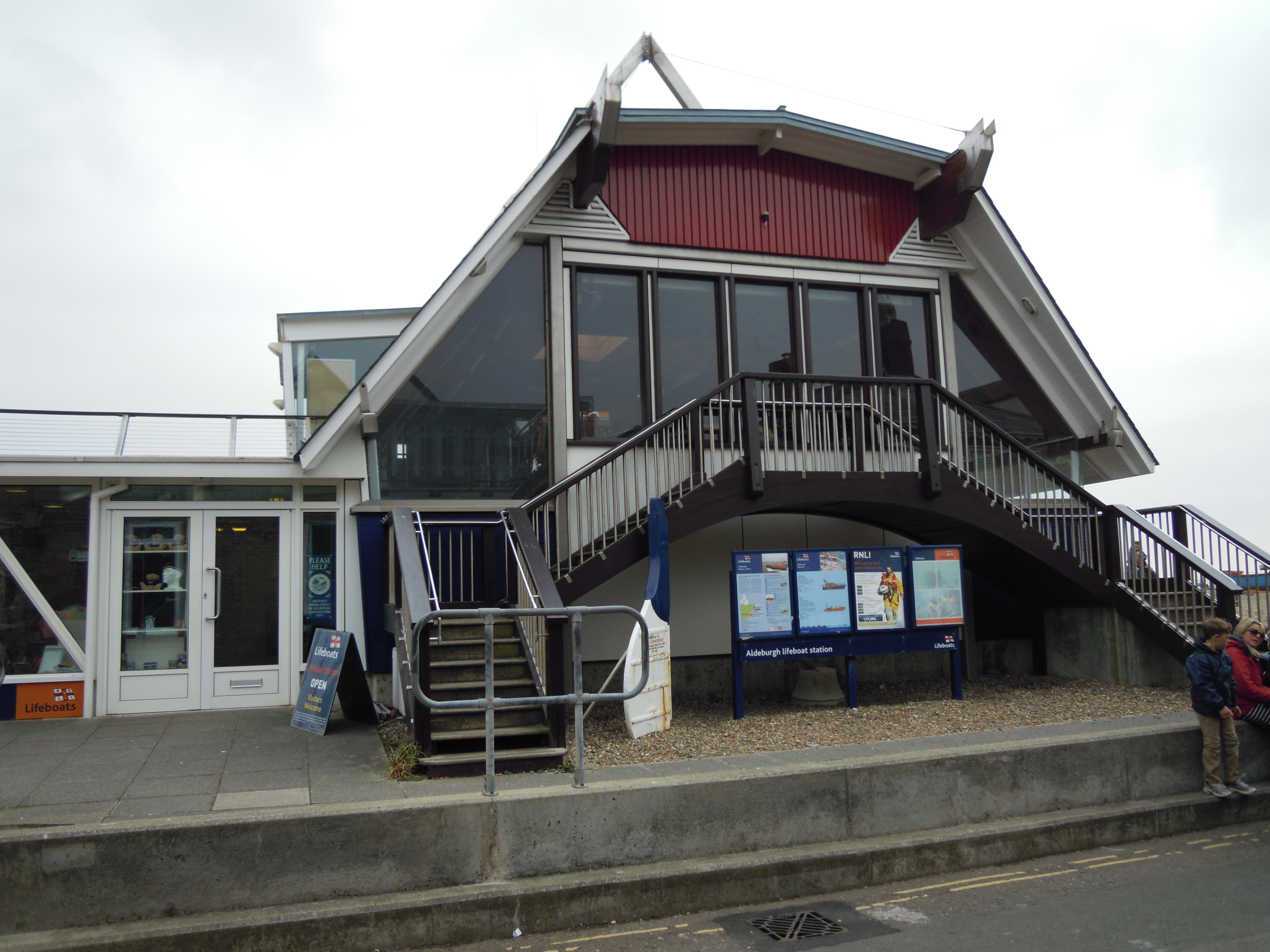

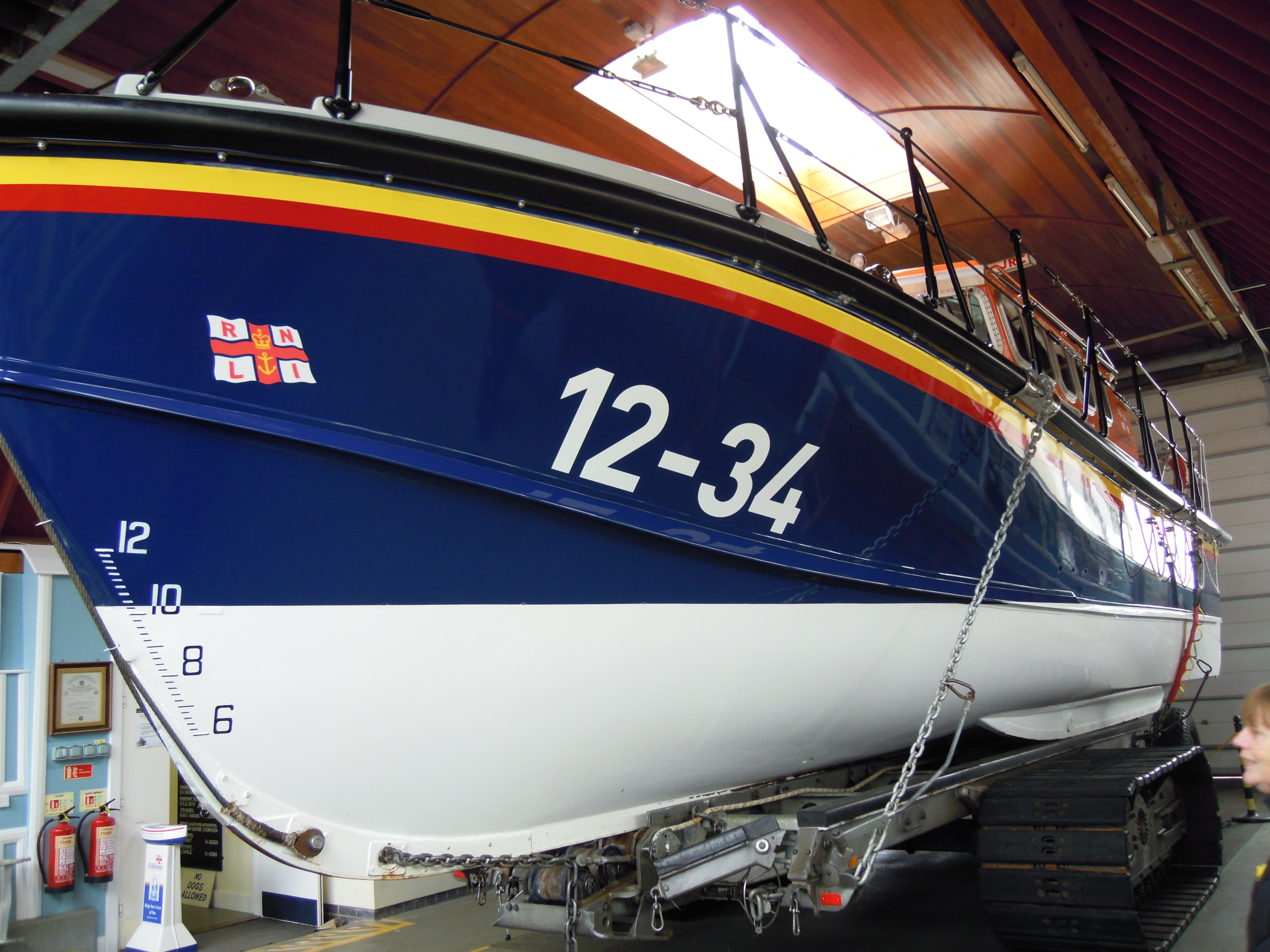

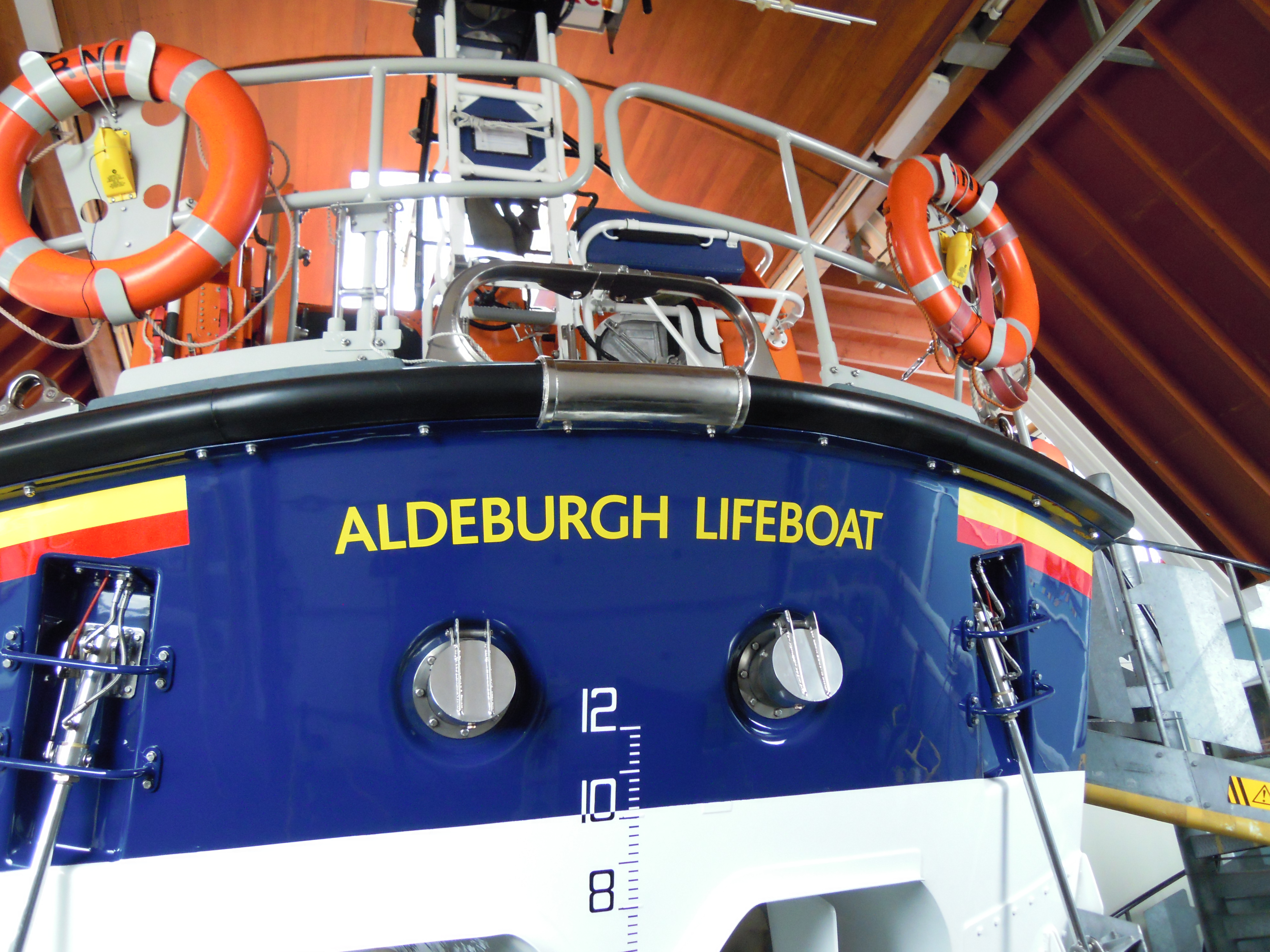

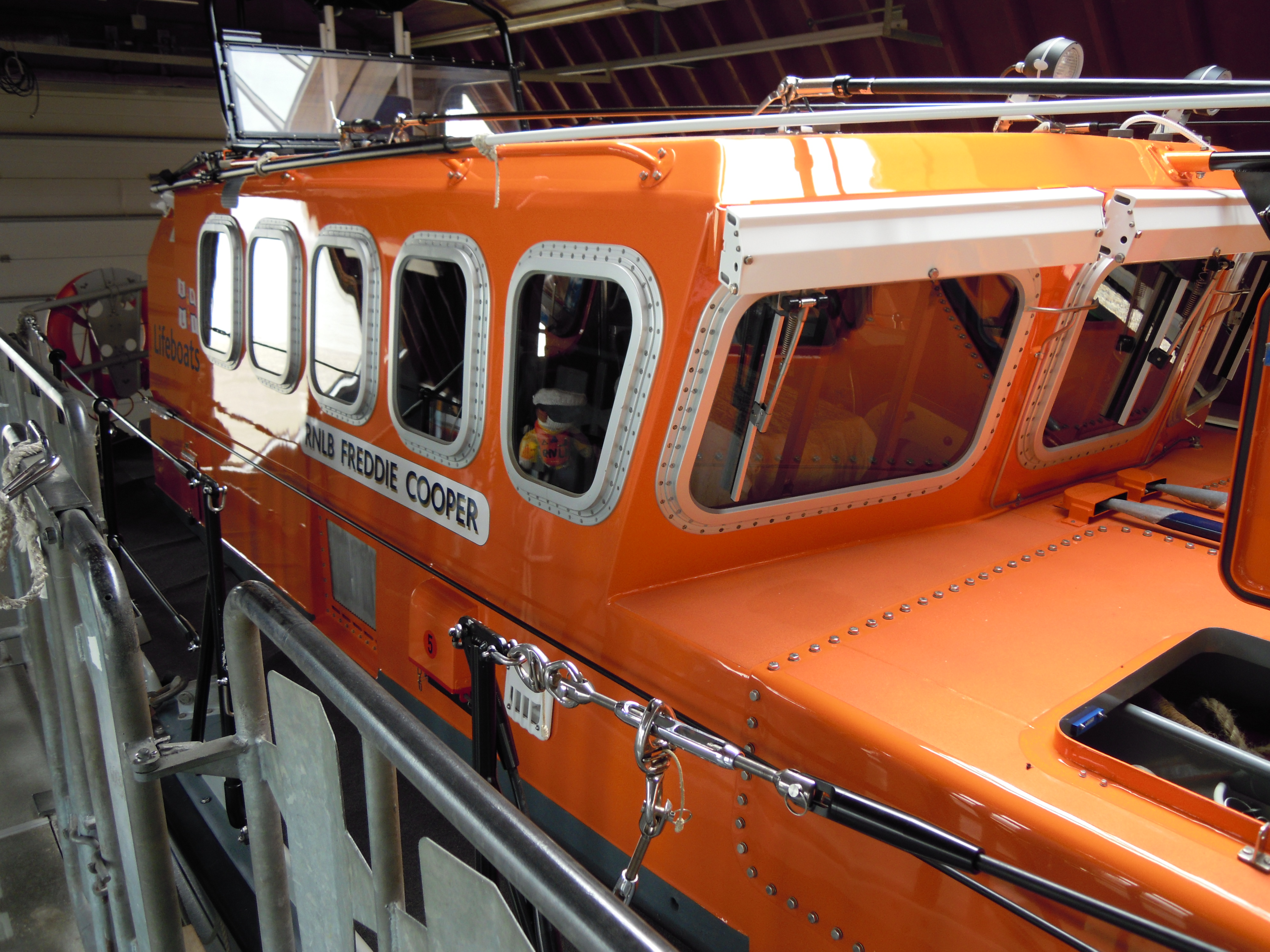

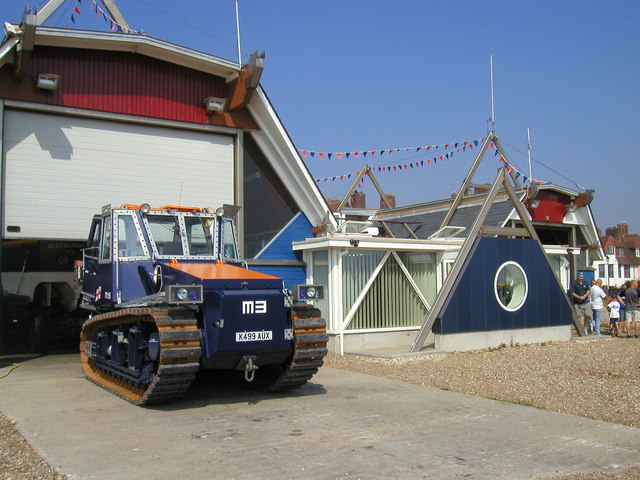

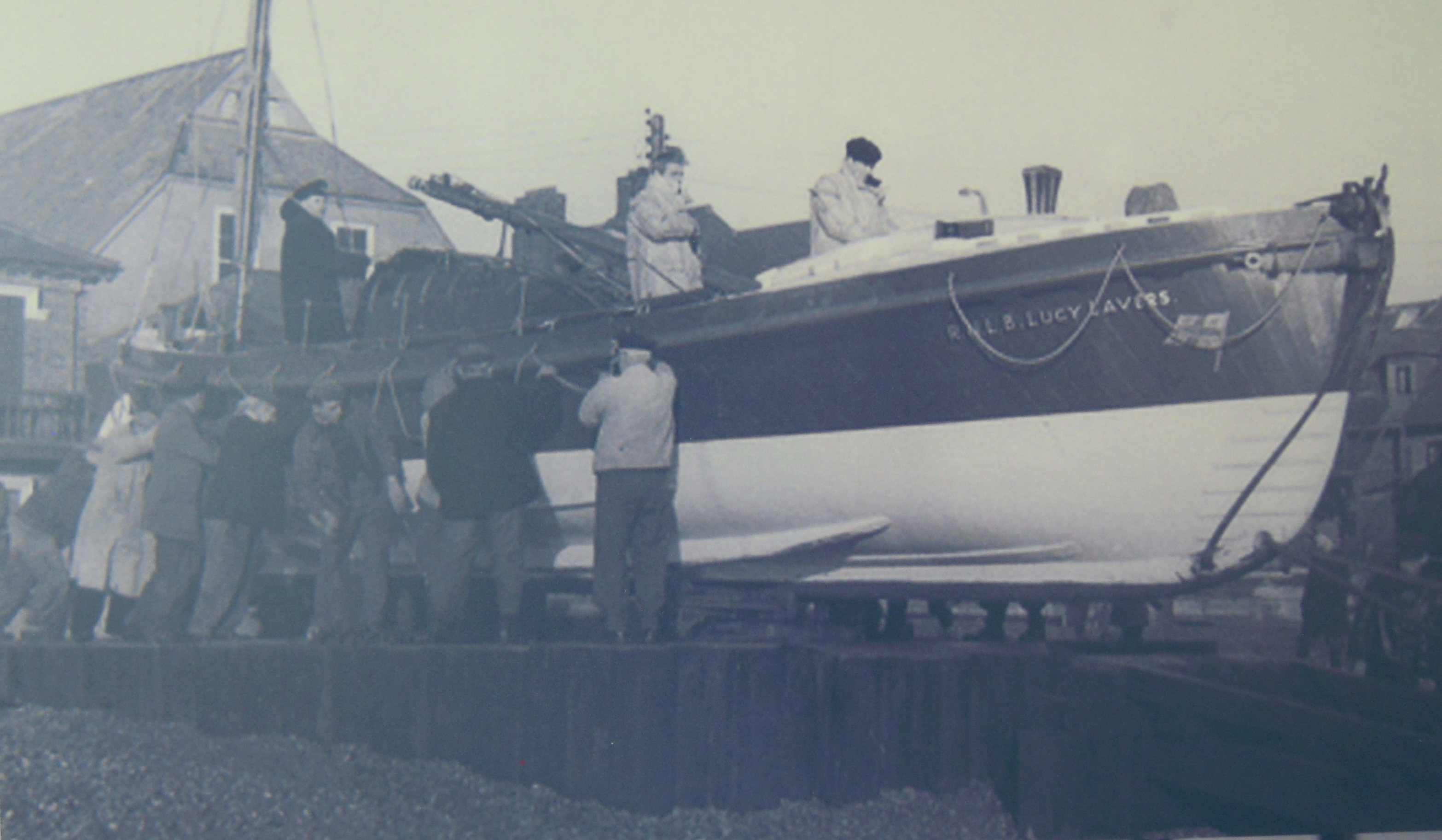

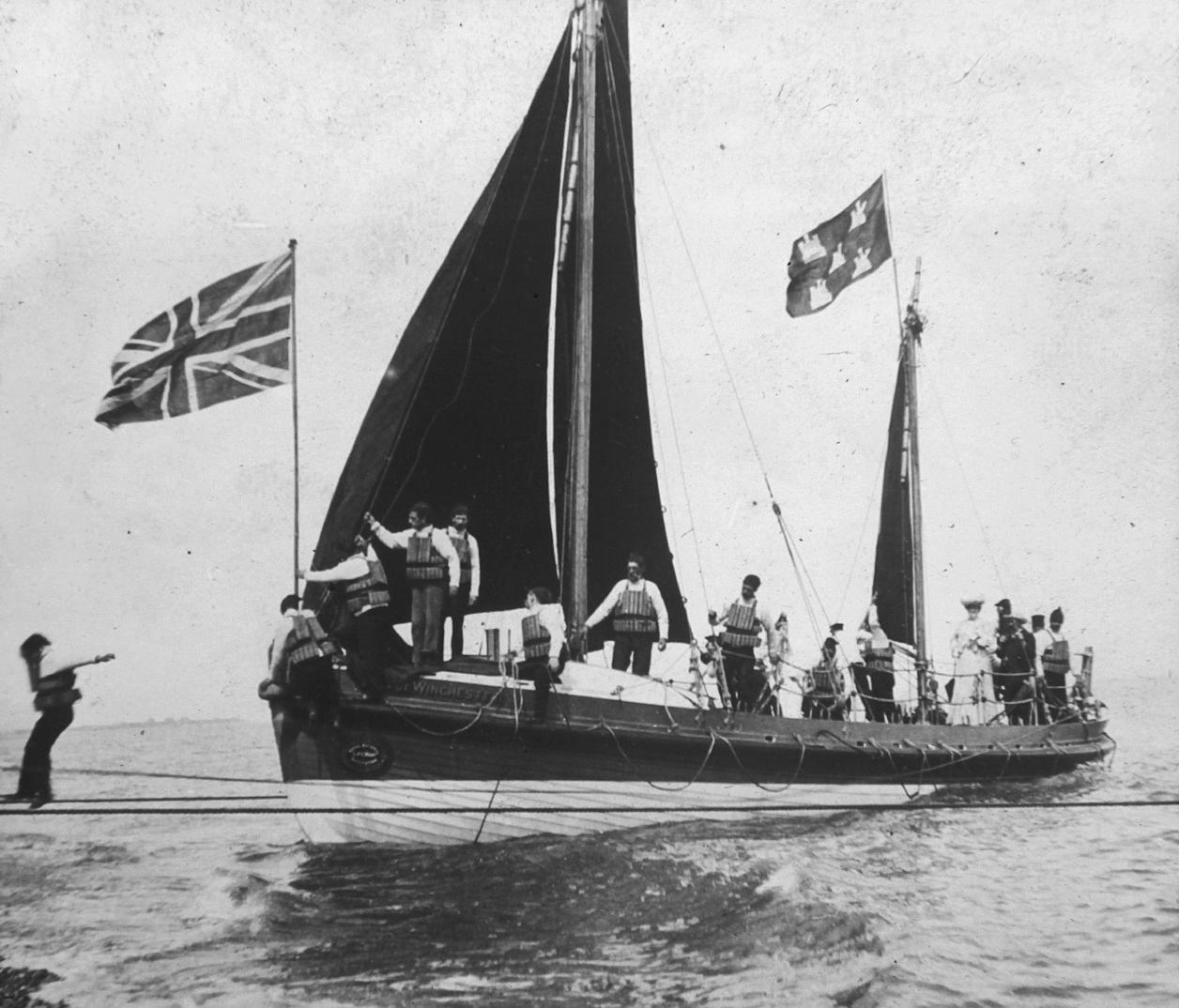

== See also ==
- List of RNLI stations
- List of former RNLI stations
- Royal National Lifeboat Institution lifeboats
- Talus Atlantic 85 DO-DO launch carriage

== Sources ==
- Leonard, Richie; Denton, Tony (2025). Lifeboat Enthusiasts Handbook 2025. Lifeboats Enthusiasts' Society.
- Leonard, Richie; Denton, Tony (2026). Lifeboat Enthusiasts Handbook 2026. Lifeboats Enthusiasts' Society.
- Farr, Grahame; Morris, Jeff (1992). List of British Lifeboats Part 1 & 2 (Second ed.). Lifeboat Enthusiasts' Society.
