= Portree Lifeboat Station =

RNLI Lifeboat station in Highland, Scotland

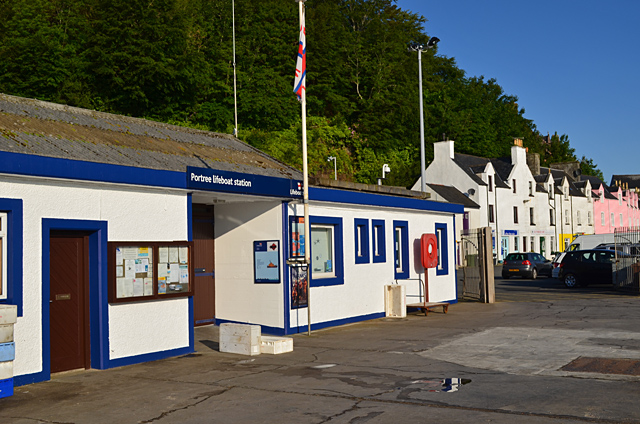
- Portree Lifeboat Station

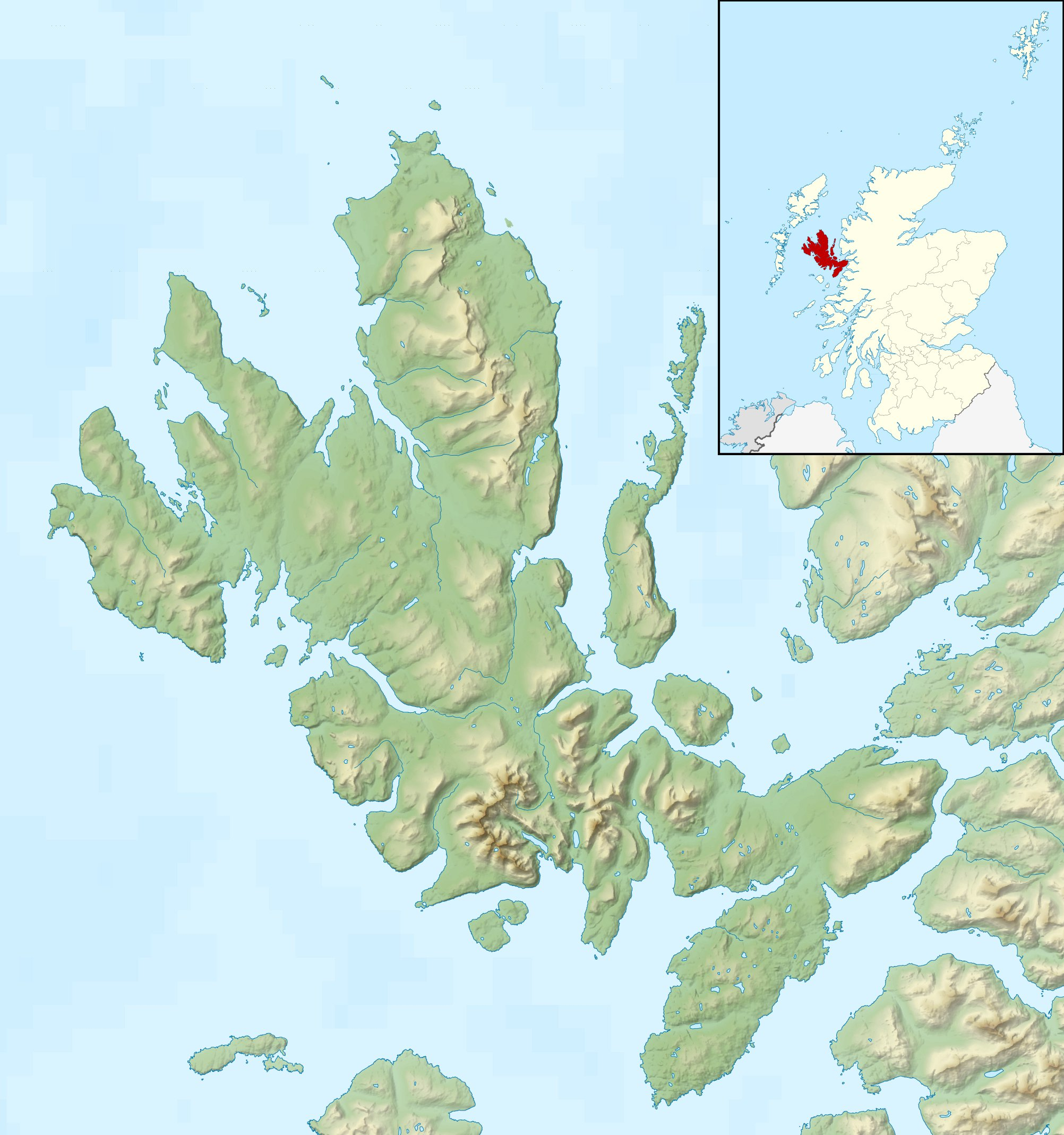
- Location within Isle of Skye Location within Highland

General information
- Type: RNLI Lifeboat Station
- Location: The Pier, Quay St, Portree, Highland, IV51 9DE, Scotland
- Coordinates: 57°24′38.7″N 6°11′24.2″W
- Opened: 9 March 1991
- Owner: Royal National Lifeboat Institution

Website
- Portree RNLI Lifeboat Station

Portree Lifeboat Station is located at the Pier, on Quay Street, in Portree, the largest town on the Isle of Skye, one of the Inner Hebrides, overlooking the Sound of Raasay, on the north-west coast of Scotland, formerly in the county of Ross and Cromarty, now in the administrative region of Highland.

A lifeboat was first placed at Portree by the Royal National Lifeboat Institution (RNLI) on 9 March 1991.

The station currently operates a Shannon-class All-weather lifeboat, 13-59 Peter and Mary (ON 1366), on station since 2026.

== History ==
Ever since its founding, the RNLI would award medals for deeds of gallantry at sea, even if no lifeboats were involved. On 14 October 1947, fisherman Kenneth MacLeod rescued three men stranded at the foot of cliffs at Pooltiel, when their boat was wrecked on the rocks. In strong winds and a moderately rough sea, he rowed two miles to the scene, then transferring the men one at a time to a larger boat. MacLeod was awarded the RNLI Bronze Medal.

In May 1989, at a meeting of the RNLI Committee of Management, it was decided that a station should be opened early in 1991 at Portree on the Isle of Skye. A 12-month evaluation period was set, after which it was hoped a permanent all-weather lifeboat station would be established. The nearest other lifeboat stations were Mallaig, 38 miles (61 km), Stornoway, 49 miles (79 km), and Lochinver, 56 miles (90 km).

On 9 March 1991, the Waveney-class relief lifeboat 44-007 Connel Elizabeth Cargill (ON 1006) was placed on service temporarily. Soon afterwards, she was replaced by another Waveney-class lifeboat, 44-016 Ralph and Joy Swann (ON 1042). Ralph and Joy Swann was built in 1976, and had previously served at Ramsgate and Tobermory. The lifeboat was named after Cmdr Ralph Swan and his wife. Swann was a former chairman of the RNLI, and was a life-vice-president, until his death in 1992.

With the station now permanently established, it was essential to provide a lifeboat house, with crew facilities, a workshop, and changing rooms and showers. A building on Portree Pier formerly operated by 'Moray Fish' was found to be an ideal location, and after suitable conversion work, was opened in 1994.

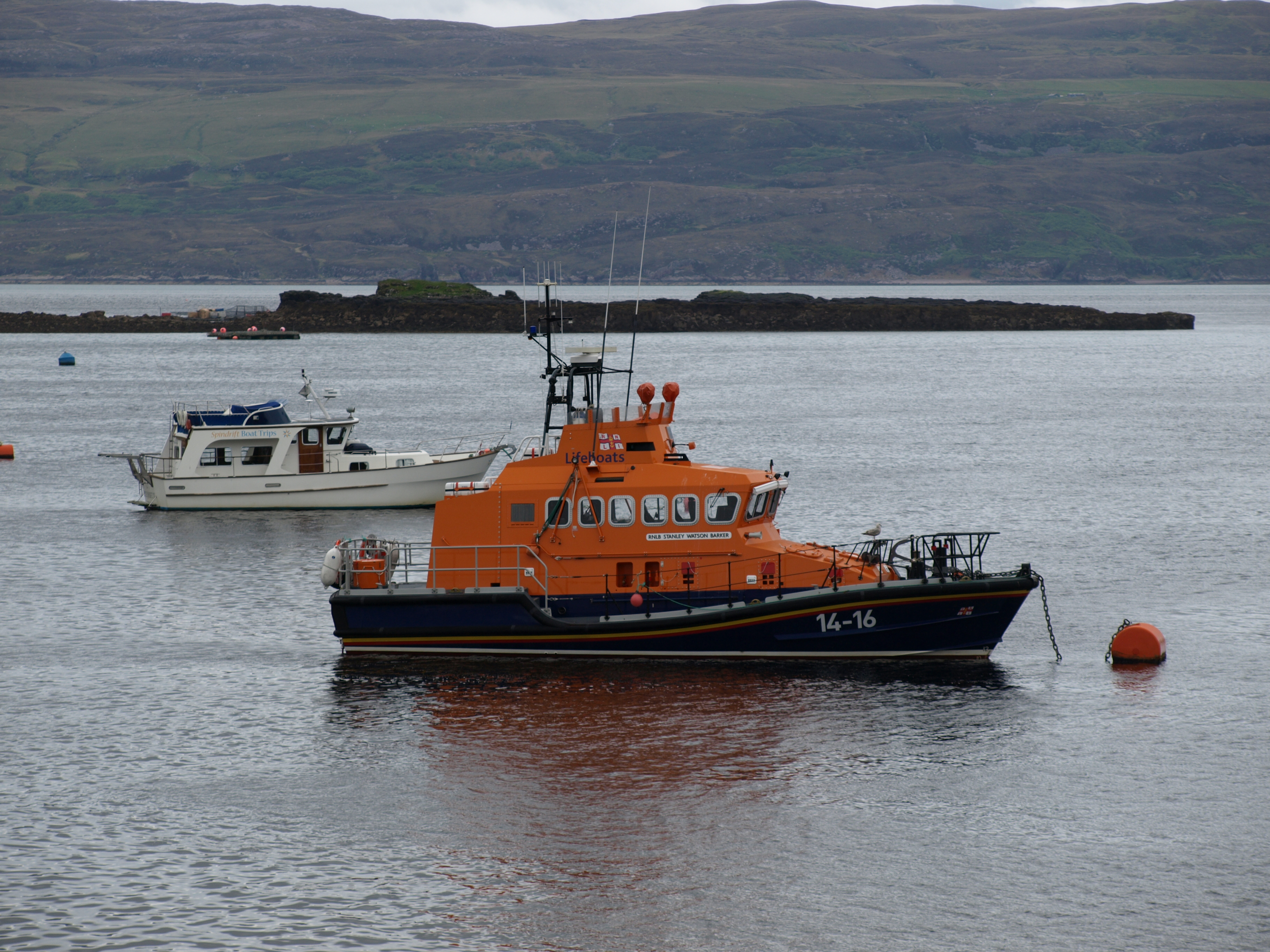
Portree Trent-class Lifeboat 14-16 Stanley Watson Barker (ON 1214)

7 June 1996 would see the arrival of Portree's first new lifeboat. The Trent-class lifeboat cost £1,175,000, and was funded from the bequest of the late Mr Stanley Watson Barker, former town clerk for Barking and Dagenham, together with legacies from Mr Jack R. Blaxland and Mrs Eileen Arabian. At a ceremony on 11 June 1997, the lifeboat was duly named 14-16 Stanley Watson Barker (ON 1214).

In 2021, Portree Lifeboat Station celebrated their 30th anniversary. In that time, Portree lifeboat had launched 520 times, helped 462 people, and saved 18 lives. Two crew members from the original crew from 1991, Hamish Corrigall and John Nicolson, also celebrated 30 years service, as coxswain and mechanic respectively.

At 13:59 on 18 April 2026, the new Shannon-class All-weather lifeboat, 13-59 Peter and Mary (ON 1366), arrived at Portree. After a period of crew training, she replaced the Trent-class lifeboat, 14-16 Stanley Watson Barker (ON 1214), which has been on station at Portree for 30 years.

Shannon-class lifeboat 13-59 Peter and Mary (ON 1366) was formally placed on service at 13:59 on Monday 1 June 2026. On 3 October 2026, a service of dedication was led by port chaplain Stephen Plant. The lifeboat was funded from the will of Gladys Mary Pitts, and family friend Renton Doig formally named the boat Peter and Mary, after Mary and her husband, pouring a special dram of Isle of Raasay Distillery malt whisky over her bow.

== Station honours ==
The following are awards made at Portree:

- RNLI Bronze Medal
  Kenneth MacLeod, fisherman – 1947
- Bronze Lifeboat Statuette
  Ewen Mackenzie, RNLI Fundraiser – 1979

== Portree lifeboats ==
ON (Note: ON is the RNLI's Official Number of the boat.)	Op.No. (Note: Op.No. is the RNLI's Operational Number of the boat carried on the hull.)	Name	Built	On station	Class	Comments
1006	44-007	Connel Elizabeth Cargill	1967	1991	Waveney	Relief fleet lifeboat, first deployed at Troon.
1042	44-016	Ralph and Joy Swann	1976	1991–1996	Waveney	Previously at Ramsgate and Tobermory. Transferred to the Relief fleet, later at Achill Island.
1214	14-16	Stanley Watson Barker	1996	1996–2026	Trent	
1366	13-59	Peter and Mary	2026	2026–	Shannon	

More post-service details can be found on the respective lifeboat class pages.

== See also ==
- List of RNLI stations
- List of former RNLI stations
- Royal National Lifeboat Institution lifeboats
