= Arun-class lifeboat =

Former RNLI lifeboat class

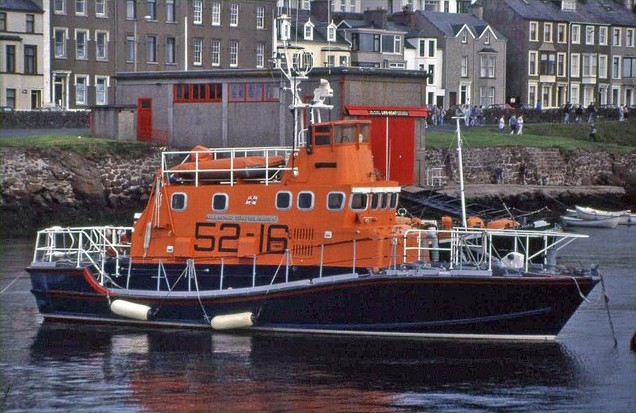
- Arun-class lifeboat 52-16 Richard Evans (Civil Service No. 39) (ON 1070) at Portrush

Class overview
- Builders: 52-01/2, 54-03 William Osborne, Littlehampton; Others, hulls moulded by Halmatic Ltd. Fitted out by:–; William Osbourne; Halmatic; W. A. Souter; Fairey Marine; Berthon Boat Co.; Robsons
- Operators: Royal National Lifeboat Institution; Royal Volunteer Coastal Patrol, later Marine Rescue NSW, Australia; Bote Salvavidas de Valparaiso, Chile; Finnish Lifeboat Institution, Finland; Norðoya Bjargingarfelag, Faroe Islands; Estonian Rescue Services Agency; China; Slysavarnafélagið Landsbjörg, Iceland; SANAS Madeira
- Preceded by: Waveney
- Succeeded by: Severn
- Cost: £128,000 (52-01) – £640,000 (52-46)
- Built: 1971–1990
- In service: 1971–2008
- Completed: 46
- Active: 11
- Laid up: 2
- Lost: 1
- Retired: 33
- Preserved: 1

General characteristics
- Type: Lifeboat
- Displacement: 32 long tons (33 t)
- Length: 52 or 54 ft (16 or 16 m)
- Beam: 17 ft (5.2 m)
- Draught: 5 ft (1.5 m)
- Propulsion: 52-01: 2 x 375 bhp (280 kW) Caterpillar D336 6-cylinder diesel.; 52-02 to 52-14: 2 x 460 bhp (340 kW) Caterpillar D343 6-cylinder; 52-15 to 52-46: 2 x 485 bhp (362 kW) Caterpillar 3408TA V-8 Turbo-Aftercooled
- Speed: 18.5 knots (34.3 km/h; 21.3 mph)
- Range: 250 nmi (460 km; 290 mi)
- Complement: 6

The Arun-class lifeboat is a fast all-weather lifeboat designed by the Royal National Lifeboat Institution (RNLI) for service at its stations around the coasts of the United Kingdom and Ireland. They were operated by the RNLI between 1971 and 2008. Many have been sold to see further service in the lifeboat and coastguard services of other countries.

The class takes its name from the River Arun in Sussex, England.

== History ==
The RNLI's first lifeboat capable of speeds in excess of 10 knots (19 km/h; 12 mph) was the 14-knot (26 km/h; 16 mph) Waveney-class boats introduced in 1967. This was based on an American design, but in 1971 it was supplemented by the Arun class, which was designed by the RNLI and gave vastly improved accommodation and increased the speed to 18.5 knots (34.3 km/h; 21.3 mph).

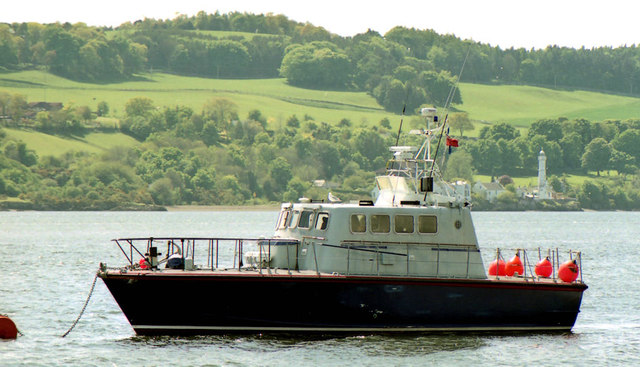
52-01 Arun (ON 1018), the first of the type, pictured in 2005

The first prototype boat, 52-01 Arun (ON 1018) entered service at St Peter Port in 1972 but moved on to Barry Dock in 1974, where it was stationed until 1997. Two more boats were introduced in 1973 and 1974 and then full production started in 1975 although small numbers of Waveney-class boats were still built until 1982. By 1990, 46 Arun-class boats had been launched. The following year saw the launch of the first 25 knots (46 km/h; 29 mph) Severn- and Trent-class boats.

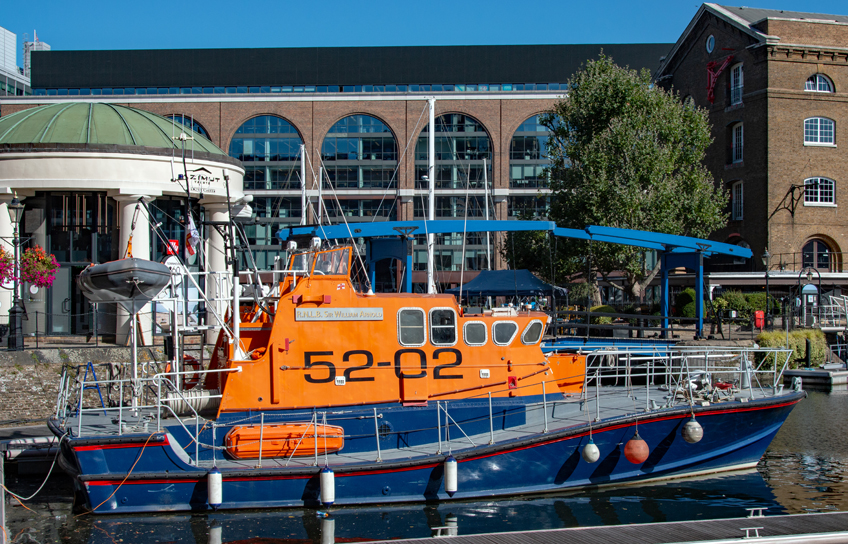
Second Arun, 52-02 William Arnold (ON 1025), in 2021

The three prototype boats were withdrawn between 1994 and 1997, the third of which then went on display first at the National Lifeboat Museum, and later at the Chatham Historic Dockyard. The production series boats were taken out of regular service between 1998 and 2007. While a few have found new uses around the coast of Great Britain, the majority have been sold to other lifeboat operators around the world, predominantly in China, Finland and Iceland, and some further boats were built new for service in Canada and Greece. Those travelling long distances go as deck cargo on larger ships but those going to closer harbours are generally sailed across under their own power. The first boat to go to Iceland, Richard Evans, was loaded as deck cargo on a container ship but was washed overboard during the passage – the only Arun to have been lost at sea.

After their relatively short RNLI service, averaging at just under 20 years, 35 boats joined other fleets to continue their service as lifeboats. As of December 2025, it is thought that 11 were still in service, with two under restoration for further service.

== Design ==
The design was developed for the RNLI by J.A. MacLachlan working for naval architects G.L. Watson of Glasgow. Initially proposed with chines along the hull to disperse the spray and improve stability when underway at speed, this caused a high deck above water which proved difficult when trying to get people aboard from the water, so the chines were dispensed with on the second boat and the deck curved down nearer the water.

The first three boats were built with wooden hulls and were respectively 51 feet 7 inches (15.72 m), 52 feet (16 m) and 54 feet (16 m) long, the extra length due to a rounded transom. All differed in superstructure design, 52-01 having a raked back superstructure front with the flying bridge at the after end. 52-02 introduced forward raked wheelhouse windscreens, had a unique wheelhouse side window pattern, and retained the aft mounted flying bridge. On 52-03, the flying bridge was moved to the forward end of the wheelhouse, the front of which was rounded. From 54-04, the forward flying bridge was standardised and the forward raked wheelhouse windscreens were reintroduced. The side windows were recessed from the superstructure sides. 54-04 had a glass reinforced plastic (GRP) hull and this was standardised for future boats. 54-04 to 54-07 retained the rounded transom, but from 52-08, a square transom was reintroduced. The final external change came with 52-11, which had flush sided forward wheelhouse windows and this was a feature of all subsequent boats.

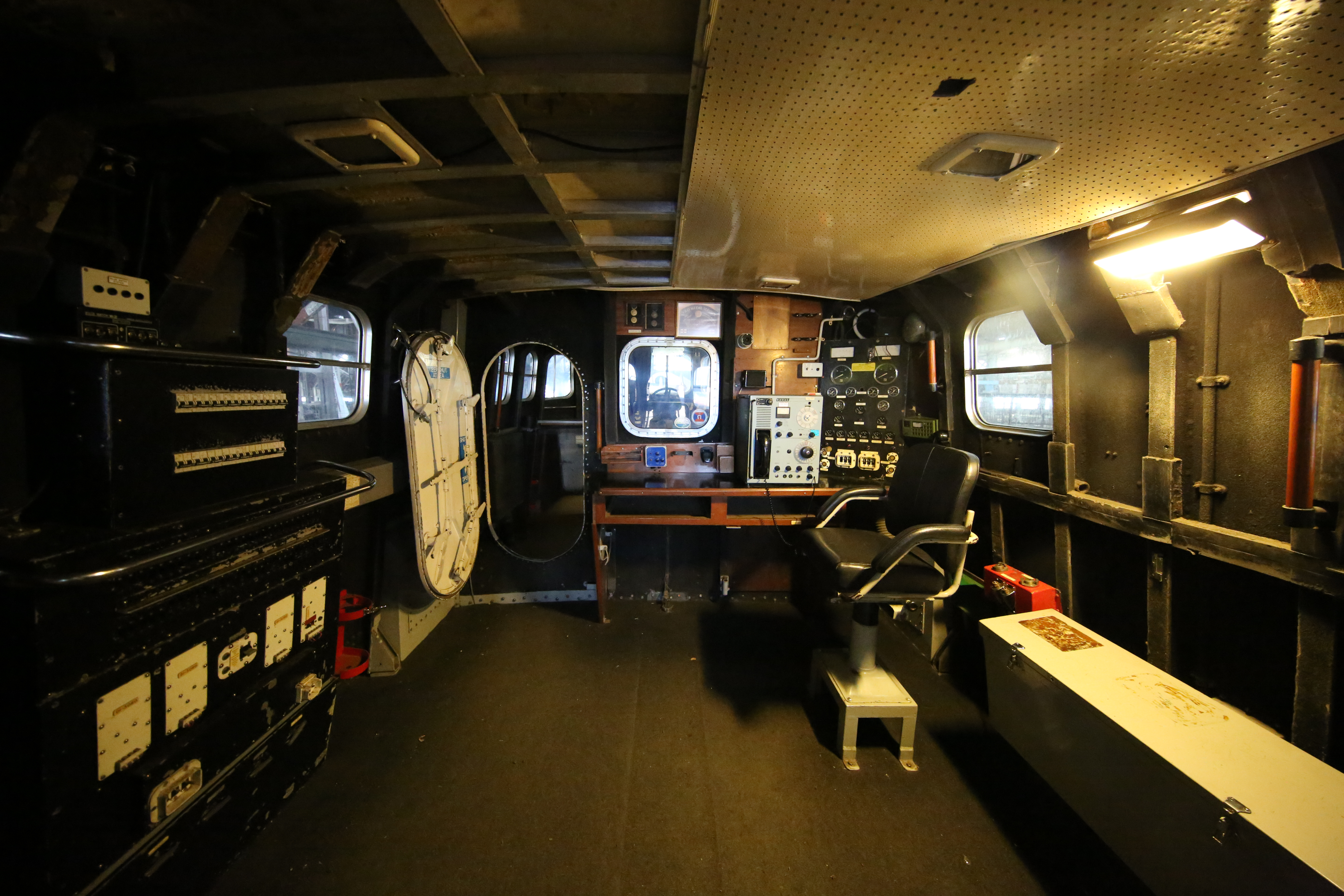
The interior of the upper rear cabin

In 1986, 52-030 Snolda (ON 1100) became the only steel-hulled Arun. The GRP hulls were moulded in blue material in the outer skin. After a while it was found that water was accumulating in the fibreglass which added up to two tons to the weight. The boats had the coloured layer stripped off and replaced by a new one made with clear gel which reduced the amount of water absorbed.

The large watertight cabin gave it self-righting capability. Two survivor cabins are situated below decks where first aid and emergency equipment is stowed. The hull is divided into 26 watertight compartments as protection against sinking should it be holed. There is also a flying bridge above the main cabin with an auxiliary steering position which can be used when additional height or visibility is required during an operation. The boat won a Design Council award in 1982.

Five different engine types were fitted:

- Caterpillar 14.6 L (890 cu in) D336 6-cyl. diesel 375 bhp (280 kW) (52-01)
- Caterpillar 14.6 L (890 cu in) D343 6.cyl diesel 460 bhp (340 kW) (52-02 – 52-14)
- Caterpillar 3208T 10.4 L (630 cu in) V8 turbo diesel (52-01)
- Caterpillar 3408TA 18.0 L (1,100 cu in) V8 turbo-aftercooled diesel 485 bhp (362 kW) (52-15 – 52-41)
- Caterpillar 3408TA 18.0 L (1,100 cu in) V8 turbo-aftercooled diesel 500 bhp (370 kW) (52-42 – 52-46)

Fuel tanks have 620-imperial-gallon (2,800 L; 740 US gal) capacity which gives an operating range of 250 nautical miles (460 km; 290 mi).

== RNLI fleet ==
ON (Note: ON is the RNLI's Official Number of the boat.)	Op. No. (Note: Op. No. is the RNLI's Operational Number of the boat carried on the hull.)	Name	Built	In service	Stations	Engines	Comments
1018	52-01	Arun	1971	1972–1973	St Peter Port	2 x D336	(Note: Gift of 'Birds Eye Foods, and Miss Johnston, plus legacies of Miss Eastland, Miss Harrison, Miss Hart and Miss Young, built by William Osborne. Re-engined with twin Caterpillar 3208T, 1992.) Wooden hull. Sold 1997. Renamed Arun Adventurer. Initial commercial use at Dundee, later Arbroath. At Scheveningen, NL, November 2025.
1018	52-01	Arun	1971	1974–1997	Barry Dock	2 x D336	Wooden hull. Sold 1997. Renamed Arun Adventurer. Initial commercial use at Dundee, later Arbroath. At Scheveningen, NL, November 2025.
1025	52-02	Sir William Arnold	1973	1973–1997	St Peter Port	2 x D343	Gold Medal Service, rescue of 29, motor ship Bonita on 13 December 1981. (Note: Gift of a special local lifeboat appeal, built by William Osborne, costing 135,000.); Wooden hull. Sold 1998. Pleasure boat at Cork until 2014. Sold 2019. Renamed Sir William Arnold. June 2022, Floating education experience at Portsmouth, March 2025.
1037	54-03	Edward Bridges (Civil Service No. 37)	1974	1975–1994	Torbay	2 x D343	(Note: Gift of CISPOTEL LB fund, built by William Osborne, costing £150,000.); Wooden hull. On display since April 1996, in the RNLI Heritage Collection at Chatham Historic Dockyard, December 2025.
1049	54-04	Tony Vandervell	1976	1975–1999	Weymouth	2 x D343	(Note: Gift of The Vandervell Foundation, built by Halmatic / William Osborne, costing £200,000.) Sold 1999. Renamed PR Mac Elliot with Finnish Lifeboat Institution, See below:–
1050	54-05	B.P. Forties	1975	1975–1998	Aberdeen	2 x D343	(Note: Gift of BP, and the students of Aberdeen University, built by Halmatic, costing £200,000.) Sold 1998. Iceland SAR 2310, see below:–
1051	54-06	The Gough Ritchie	1976	1976–1998	Port St Mary	2 x D343	(Note: Gift of Mrs Ritchie, built by Halmatic / William Osborne, costing £210,000.) Sold 1998. To Chile SAR CB-8891, see below:–
1052	54-07	City of Bradford IV	1976	1977–1987	Humber	2 x D343	Gold Medal Service, Rescue of 4, Panamanian motor vessel Revi 14 February 1979. (Note: Gift of the City of Bradford LB Appeal, the Sheffield LB Fund, and the Internation Transport Workers Federation, built by Halmatic, costing £200,000.) Sold 1998. Renamed Lady Arun, Theocrat and Restless. Last reported as a ship's tender, Helsinki, April 2018.
1052	54-07	City of Bradford IV	1976	1988–1989	Thurso	2 x D343	Gold Medal Service, Rescue of 4, Panamanian motor vessel Revi 14 February 1979. Sold 1998. Renamed Lady Arun, Theocrat and Restless. Last reported as a ship's tender, Helsinki, April 2018.
1052	54-07	City of Bradford IV	1976	1989–1990	Ballyglass	2 x D343	Gold Medal Service, Rescue of 4, Panamanian motor vessel Revi 14 February 1979. Sold 1998. Renamed Lady Arun, Theocrat and Restless. Last reported as a ship's tender, Helsinki, April 2018.
1052	54-07	City of Bradford IV	1976	1991–1998	Tobermory	2 x D343	Gold Medal Service, Rescue of 4, Panamanian motor vessel Revi 14 February 1979. Sold 1998. Renamed Lady Arun, Theocrat and Restless. Last reported as a ship's tender, Helsinki, April 2018.
1053	52-08	Joy and John Wade	1977	1977–2001	Yarmouth	2 x D343	(Note: Gift of 'The Wade Foundation', plus the Yarmouth IOW LB Appeal, built by Halmatic / William Osborne, costing £187,000.) Sold 2002. To Iceland SAR 2542, see below:–
1053	52-08	Joy and John Wade	1977	2001	Relief fleet	2 x D343	Sold 2002. To Iceland SAR 2542, see below:–
1056	52-09	Spirit of Tayside	1978	1978–1999	Broughty Ferry	2 x D343	(Note: Gift of 'The Broughty Ferry LB Appeal', built by Halmatic, costing £250,000.) Sold 1999. To Australia SAR PS40, see below:–
1057	52-10	Soldian	1978	1978–1997	Lerwick	2 x D343	(Note: Gift of 'The Lerwick Lifeboat Appeal', plus the legacies of Miss Blyth, Mr Gray, Miss Dickenson, Miss Halcrow and Mrs Rae, built by Halmatic / William Osborne, costing £250,000.) Sold 2002. Iceland SAR 2541
1057	52-10	Soldian	1978	1998–1999	Achill Island	2 x D343	Sold 2002. Iceland SAR 2541
1057	52-10	Soldian	1978	1999–2001	Relief fleet	2 x D343	Sold 2002. Iceland SAR 2541
1058	52-11	Elizabeth Ann	1979	1979–1997	Falmouth	2 x D343	(Note: Gift of The John Slater Federation, the Sir Kirby Laing Foundation, two anonymous donors, plus The Cornish LB Appeal, built by Halmatic / William Osborne, costing £249,737.) Sold 2002. To Australia SAR Ulladulla 30, see below:–
1058	52-11	Elizabeth Ann	1979	1997–2001	Relief fleet	2 x D343	Sold 2002. To Australia SAR Ulladulla 30, see below:–
1059	52-12	Walter and Margaret Couper	1979	1979–1999	Campbeltown	2 x D343	(Note: Legacy of Miss Couper, built by Halmatic, costing £300,000.) Sold 2001. June 2002, Finnish Lifeboat Institution SAR vessel Arvinsilmä
1059	52-12	Walter and Margaret Couper	1979	1999–2001	Relief fleet	2 x D343	Sold 2001. June 2002, Finnish Lifeboat Institution SAR vessel Arvinsilmä
1061	52-13	George and Olive Turner	1980	1980–1999	Tynemouth	2 x D343	(Note: Legacy of Mrs Turner, a donation from The James Knott Trust, plus the Tyneside LB Appeal, built by Halmatic / William Osborne, costing £249,737.) Sold 2000. Iceland SAR 2474, see below:–
1061	52-13	George and Olive Turner	1980	1999–2000	Relief fleet	2 x D343	Sold 2000. Iceland SAR 2474, see below:–
1062	52-14	Edith Emilie	1980	1980–1999	Relief fleet	2 x D343	(Note: Gift of Mrs E. E. Currie, built by Halmatic / Souters Marine, costing £350,000.) Sold 1999. Renamed Edith Emilie as a Pilot boat at Montrose, August 2021. Now unaltered workboat Mare Rosa at Mgarr harbour, Gozo, Malta, October 2025.
1067	52-15	Hyman Winstone	1980	1980–1984	Holyhead	2 x 3408TA (485)	(Note: Gift of Mrs Winstone, built by Halmatic / William Osborne, costing £350,000.) Sold 2003. Renamed Ryan Wins, Madeira SAR, see below:–
1067	52-15	Hyman Winstone	1980	1984–1985	Relief fleet	2 x 3408TA (485)	Sold 2003. Renamed Ryan Wins, Madeira SAR, see below:–
1067	52-15	Hyman Winstone	1980	1985–1998	Ballycotton	2 x 3408TA (485)	Sold 2003. Renamed Ryan Wins, Madeira SAR, see below:–
1067	52-15	Hyman Winstone	1980	1998–2000	Larne	2 x 3408TA (485)	Sold 2003. Renamed Ryan Wins, Madeira SAR, see below:–
1067	52-15	Hyman Winstone	1980	2000–2002	Relief fleet	2 x 3408TA (485)	Sold 2003. Renamed Ryan Wins, Madeira SAR, see below:–
1070	52-16	Richard Evans (Civil Service No. 39)	1981	1981–2000	Portrush	2 x 3408TA (485)	(Note: Gift of CIPOTEL LB Fund, built by Halmatic / William Osborne, costing £350,000.) Sold 2003. To Iceland SAR, but wrecked during delivery, March 2004.
1070	52-16	Richard Evans (Civil Service No. 39)	1981	2000–2003	Relief fleet	2 x 3408TA (485)	Sold 2003. To Iceland SAR, but wrecked during delivery, March 2004.
1071	52-17	Sir Max Aitken	1981	1981–2002	Relief fleet	2 x 3408TA (485)	(Note: Gift of The Beaverbook Foundation LB Fund, built by Halmatic / Fairey Marine, costing £350,000.) Sold 2003. Renamed RSC Maximus, MOD Pendine Range Safety Vessel; Sold 2019. Renamed Harvest Moon. Converted to live-aboard, Port Medway Marina, Kent, October 2025
1073	52-18	Robert Edgar	1981	1981–1997	St Mary's	2 x 3408TA (485)	(Note: Gift of Mrs E. Edgar and Mr A. Edgar, built by Halmatic / William Osborne, costing £350,000.) Sold 2003. Purchased 2021 by Skipper Training NZ for training commercial mariners, Nelson, New Zealand, named 52-18, still in RNLI livery, December 2024.
1073	52-18	Robert Edgar	1981	1997–1999	Relief fleet	2 x 3408TA (485)	Sold 2003. Purchased 2021 by Skipper Training NZ for training commercial mariners, Nelson, New Zealand, named 52-18, still in RNLI livery, December 2024.
1073	52-18	Robert Edgar	1981	1999–2002	Weymouth	2 x 3408TA (485)	Sold 2003. Purchased 2021 by Skipper Training NZ for training commercial mariners, Nelson, New Zealand, named 52-18, still in RNLI livery, December 2024.
1076	52-19	Marie Winstone	1981	1981–1994	Fishguard	2 x 3408TA (485)	(Note: Gift of Mrs M. Winstone, built by Halmatic / Souters Marine, costing £300,000.) Sold 2002. Finnish Lifeboat Institution SAR-vessel PR Torbay, see below:–
1076	52-19	Marie Winstone	1981	1995–2001	Torbay	2 x 3408TA (485)	Sold 2002. Finnish Lifeboat Institution SAR-vessel PR Torbay, see below:–
1076	52-19	Marie Winstone	1981	2001–2002	Relief fleet	2 x 3408TA (485)	Sold 2002. Finnish Lifeboat Institution SAR-vessel PR Torbay, see below:–
1077	52-20	Duchess of Kent	1982	1982–2002	Relief fleet	2 x 3408TA (485)	(Note: Gift of the United Grand Lodge of England, built by Halmatic / William Osborne, costing £350,000.) Sold 2003. Renamed Salvador do Mar, Madeira (Portugal) SAR, see below:–
1078	52-21	The Davina and Charles Matthew Hunter	1982	1982–2001	Mallaig	2 x 3408TA (485)	(Note: Legacy of Miss L. F. Hunter, built by Halmatic / William Osborne, costing £350,000.) Sold 2003. Iceland SAR 2593, see below:–
1078	52-21	The Davina and Charles Matthew Hunter	1982	2001–2003	Relief fleet	2 x 3408TA (485)	Sold 2003. Iceland SAR 2593, see below:–
1081	52-22	Ralph and Bonella Farrant	1982	1982–1994	Relief fleet	2 x 3408TA (485)	(Note: Funded by the RNLI, built by Halmatic / Souters Marine, costing £330,000.) Sold 2005. China SAR Hua Ying 393, see below:–
1081	52-22	Ralph and Bonella Farrant	1982	1994–1999	Fenit	2 x 3408TA (485)	Sold 2005. China SAR Hua Ying 393, see below:–
1081	52-22	Ralph and Bonella Farrant	1982	1999–2003	Relief fleet	2 x 3408TA (485)	Sold 2005. China SAR Hua Ying 393, see below:–
1082	52-23	Margaret Frances Love	1982	1983–1996	Valentia	2 x 3408TA (485)	(Note: Legacy of Mr Love and Lady Frances Murphy, built by Halmatic / William Osborne, costing £356,000.) Sold 2005. China SAR Hua Ying 398, see below:–
1082	52-23	Margaret Frances Love	1982	1997–2003	Barry Dock	2 x 3408TA (485)	Sold 2005. China SAR Hua Ying 398, see below:–
1085	52-24	Mabel Alice	1982	1983–2003	Penlee	2 x 3408TA (485)	(Note: Gift of Mr David Robinson, built by Halmatic / Fairey Marine, costing £350,000.) Sold 2004. Renamed Strathclyde, with Strathclyde Police. Trip boat at Portishead. November 2021, Renamed Mabel Alice, Pilot/Lifeboat at Puerto Natales, Chile, December 2024
1085	52-24	Mabel Alice	1982	2003	Relief fleet	2 x 3408TA (485)	Sold 2004. Renamed Strathclyde, with Strathclyde Police. Trip boat at Portishead. November 2021, Renamed Mabel Alice, Pilot/Lifeboat at Puerto Natales, Chile, December 2024
1086	52-25	A. J. R. & L. G. Uridge	1983	1983–1994	Relief fleet	2 x 3408TA (485)	(Note: Legacy of Mr L. G. Uridge and gift of the late Mrs A. A. Burnley, built by Halmatic / William Osborne, costing £350,000.) Sold 2003. Finnish Lifeboat Institution SAR-vessel PR Hebe, see below:–
1086	52-25	A. J. R. & L. G. Uridge	1983	1994–1995	Torbay	2 x 3408TA (485)	Sold 2003. Finnish Lifeboat Institution SAR-vessel PR Hebe, see below:–
1086	52-25	A. J. R. & L. G. Uridge	1983	1995–1997	Relief fleet	2 x 3408TA (485)	Sold 2003. Finnish Lifeboat Institution SAR-vessel PR Hebe, see below:–
1086	52-25	A. J. R. & L. G. Uridge	1983	1997–1998	Holyhead	2 x 3408TA (485)	Sold 2003. Finnish Lifeboat Institution SAR-vessel PR Hebe, see below:–
1086	52-25	A. J. R. & L. G. Uridge	1983	1998–2003	Relief fleet	2 x 3408TA (485)	Sold 2003. Finnish Lifeboat Institution SAR-vessel PR Hebe, see below:–
1086	52-25	A. J. R. & L. G. Uridge	1983	2003	Penlee	2 x 3408TA (485)	Sold 2003. Finnish Lifeboat Institution SAR-vessel PR Hebe, see below:–
1092	52-26	St Brendan	1984	1984–2001	Rosslare Harbour	2 x 3408TA (485)	(Note: Funded by the RNLI, built by Halmatic / William Osborne, costing £370,000.) Badly damaged by Ferry whilst on berth, 9 September 2001. Sold 2003. Renamed Irish Mist. At Ramsey, Isle of Man, December 2025.
1093	52-27	Charles Brown	1984	1984–2003	Buckie	2 x 3408TA (485)	(Note: Gift of Mr David Robinson, built by Halmatic / William Osborne, costing £370,000.) Sold 2005. China SAR Hua Ying 396, see below:–
1093	52-27	Charles Brown	1984	2003–2005	Relief fleet	2 x 3408TA (485)	Sold 2005. China SAR Hua Ying 396, see below:–
1098	52-28	Sir Max Aitken II	1984	1984–1999	Stornoway	2 x 3408TA (485)	(Note: Gift of The Beaverbook Foundation LB Fund, built by Halmatic / Souters Marine, costing £370,000.) Sold 2005. China SAR Hua Ying 397, see below:–
1098	52-28	Sir Max Aitken II	1984	1999	Relief fleet	2 x 3408TA (485)	Sold 2005. China SAR Hua Ying 397, see below:–
1098	52-28	Sir Max Aitken II	1984	1999–2004	Longhope	2 x 3408TA (485)	Sold 2005. China SAR Hua Ying 397, see below:–
1098	52-28	Sir Max Aitken II	1984	2004–2005	Relief fleet	2 x 3408TA (485)	Sold 2005. China SAR Hua Ying 397, see below:–
1099	52-29	The Joseph Rothwell Sykes and Hilda M	1984	1984–1998	Stromness	2 x 3408TA (485)	(Note: Legacy of Mr J. Sykes, Mrs N. Sykes, Miss Rothwell, and Mrs H. M. Vyvyan, built by Halmatic / William Osborne, costing £370,000.) Sold 2002. Finnish Lifeboat Institution SAR-vessel PR Janne Malén, see below:–
1099	52-29	The Joseph Rothwell Sykes and Hilda M	1984	1998–1999	Relief fleet	2 x 3408TA (485)	Sold 2002. Finnish Lifeboat Institution SAR-vessel PR Janne Malén, see below:–
1099	52-29	The Joseph Rothwell Sykes and Hilda M	1984	1999–2001	Broughty Ferry	2 x 3408TA (485)	Sold 2002. Finnish Lifeboat Institution SAR-vessel PR Janne Malén, see below:–
1099	52-29	The Joseph Rothwell Sykes and Hilda M	1984	2001–2002	Relief fleet	2 x 3408TA (485)	Sold 2002. Finnish Lifeboat Institution SAR-vessel PR Janne Malén, see below:–
1100	52-030	Snolda	1986	1986–1998	Aith	2 x 3408TA (485)	(Note: Gift of various oil companies, built by Fairey Marine, costing £480,000.) Steel Hull. Sold 2007. Iceland SAR 2743, see below:–
1100	52-030	Snolda	1986	1998	Relief fleet	2 x 3408TA (485)	Steel Hull. Sold 2007. Iceland SAR 2743, see below:–
1100	52-030	Snolda	1986	1998–2007	Training fleet	2 x 3408TA (485)	Steel Hull. Sold 2007. Iceland SAR 2743, see below:–
1103	52-31	Newsbuoy	1984	1984–2002	Relief fleet	2 x 3408TA (485)	(Note: Special appeal by 'The Newspaper Society', built by Halmatic / Souters Marine, costing £400,000.) Sold 2005. Faroe Islands SAR XPZX, see below:–
1103	52-31	Newsbuoy	1984	2002–2003	Plymouth	2 x 3408TA (485)	Sold 2005. Faroe Islands SAR XPZX, see below:–
1103	52-31	Newsbuoy	1984	2003–2004	Relief fleet	2 x 3408TA (485)	Sold 2005. Faroe Islands SAR XPZX, see below:–
1106	52-32	RNLB Keith Anderson	1985	1985–1999	Newhaven	2 x 3408TA (485)	(Note: Gift of Mrs Esme Anderson, built by Halmatic / William Osborne, costing £415,000.) Sold 2006. China SAR Hua Ying 394, see below:–
1106	52-32	RNLB Keith Anderson	1985	1999-2000	Relief fleet	2 x 3408TA (485)	Sold 2006. China SAR Hua Ying 394, see below:–
1106	52-32	RNLB Keith Anderson	1985	2000-2003	Hartlepool	2 x 3408TA (485)	Sold 2006. China SAR Hua Ying 394, see below:–
1106	52-32	RNLB Keith Anderson	1985	2003	Relief fleet	2 x 3408TA (485)	Sold 2006. China SAR Hua Ying 394, see below:–
1107	52-33	City of Belfast	1985	1985–2003	Donaghadee	2 x 3408TA (485)	(Note: Gift of the City of Belfast LB Appeal, built by Halmatic / William Osborne, costing £415,000.) Sold 2005. China SAR Hua Ying 395, see below:–
1107	52-33	City of Belfast	1985	2003	Relief fleet	2 x 3408TA (485)	Sold 2005. China SAR Hua Ying 395, see below:–
1108	52-34	RNLB Margaret Russell Fraser	1984	1986–2002	Relief fleet	2 x 3408TA (485)	(Note: Legacy of Miss M. R. Fraser, plus other gifts, built by Halmatic / Souters Marine, costing £415,000.) Sold 2004. Iceland SAR 2638, see below:–
1108	52-34	RNLB Margaret Russell Fraser	1984	2002–2004	Calshot	2 x 3408TA (485)	Sold 2004. Iceland SAR 2638, see below:–
1113	52-35	City of Dublin	1986	1986–2002	Howth	2 x 3408TA (485)	(Note: Gift of the City of Dublin LB Appeal, built by Halmatic / Berthon Boat Co., costing £543,552.) Sold 2004. Iceland SAR 2629, see below:–
1113	52-35	City of Dublin	1986	2002–2003	Relief fleet	2 x 3408TA (485)	Sold 2004. Iceland SAR 2629, see below:–
1118	52-36	Roy and Barbara Harding	1987	1987–1997	Galway Bay	2 x 3408TA (485)	(Note: Funded by the RNLI, built by Halmatic / William Osborne, costing £466,448.) Sold 2004. Iceland SAR 2623, see below:–
1118	52-36	Roy and Barbara Harding	1987	1997–2004	Castletownbere	2 x 3408TA (485)	Sold 2004. Iceland SAR 2623, see below:–
1118	52-36	Roy and Barbara Harding	1987	2004	Relief fleet	2 x 3408TA (485)	Sold 2004. Iceland SAR 2623, see below:–
1123	52-37	Kenneth Thelwall	1987	1987–1997	Humber	2 x 3408TA (485)	(Note: Legacy of Mr K. Thelwell, built by Halmatic / Berthon Boat Co., costing £537,000.) Sold 2005. China SAR Hua Ying 399, see below:–
1123	52-37	Kenneth Thelwall	1987	1997–1998	Relief fleet	2 x 3408TA (485)	Sold 2005. China SAR Hua Ying 399, see below:–
1123	52-37	Kenneth Thelwall	1987	1998–2003	Holyhead	2 x 3408TA (485)	Sold 2005. China SAR Hua Ying 399, see below:–
1123	52-37	Kenneth Thelwall	1987	2003–2004	Relief fleet	2 x 3408TA (485)	Sold 2005. China SAR Hua Ying 399, see below:–
1134	52-38	City of Glasgow III	1987	1987–2004	Troon	2 x 3408TA (485)	(Note: Gift of the City of Glasgow LB Appeal, plus other gifts and legacies, built by Halmatic / Souters Marine, costing £562,248.) Sold 2005. Iceland SAR 2679, see below:–
1134	52-38	City of Glasgow III	1987	2004–2005	Relief fleet	2 x 3408TA (485)	Sold 2005. Iceland SAR 2679, see below:–
1135	52-39	Mickie Salvesen	1988	1988–1998	Kirkwall	2 x 3408TA (485)	(Note: Legacy of Mr M. Salvesen, built by Halmatic, costing £587,133.) Sold 2006. Iceland SAR 2681, see below:–
1135	52-39	Mickie Salvesen	1988	1998	Relief fleet	2 x 3408TA (485)	Sold 2006. Iceland SAR 2681, see below:–
1135	52-39	Mickie Salvesen	1988	1998–2000	Aberdeen	2 x 3408TA (485)	Sold 2006. Iceland SAR 2681, see below:–
1135	52-39	Mickie Salvesen	1988	2000–2003	Relief fleet	2 x 3408TA (485)	Sold 2006. Iceland SAR 2681, see below:–
1135	52-39	Mickie Salvesen	1988	2003–2006	Barry Dock	2 x 3408TA (485)	Sold 2006. Iceland SAR 2681, see below:–
1136	52-40	City of Plymouth	1987	1988–2002	Plymouth	2 x 3408TA (485)	(Note: Gift of the citizens of Plymouth, plus other gifts and legacies, built by Halmatic / Souters Marine, costing £592,478.) Sold 2004. Iceland SAR 2637, see below:–
1136	52-40	City of Plymouth	1987	2002–2004	Relief fleet	2 x 3408TA (485)	Sold 2004. Iceland SAR 2637, see below:–
1143	52-41	Ann Lewis Fraser	1988	1988–1998	Barra Island	2 x 3408TA (485)	(Note: Legacy of 'The Fraser Foundation', built by Halmatic / Berthon Boat Co., costing £552,162.) Sold 2005. China SAR Hua Ying 392, see below:–
1143	52-41	Ann Lewis Fraser	1988	1998–2003	Tobermory	2 x 3408TA (485)	Sold 2005. China SAR Hua Ying 392, see below:–
1143	52-41	Ann Lewis Fraser	1988	2003–2004	Relief fleet	2 x 3408TA (485)	Sold 2005. China SAR Hua Ying 392, see below:–
1143	52-41	Ann Lewis Fraser	1988	2004	Rosslare Harbour	2 x 3408TA (485)	Sold 2005. China SAR Hua Ying 392, see below:–
1144	52-42	Murray Lornie	1988	1989–2003	Lochinver	2 x 3408TA (500)	(Note: Gift of The Ben Vorlich Trust, plus a bequest from Miss E. A. Grierson, built by Halmatic / Robsons, costing £533,417.) Sold 2005. Iceland SAR 2683, see below:–
1144	52-42	Murray Lornie	1988	2003–2004	Relief fleet	2 x 3408TA (500)	Sold 2005. Iceland SAR 2683, see below:–
1144	52-42	Murray Lornie	1988	2004	Castletownbere	2 x 3408TA (500)	Sold 2005. Iceland SAR 2683, see below:–
1144	52-42	Murray Lornie	1988	2004–2005	Relief fleet	2 x 3408TA (500)	Sold 2005. Iceland SAR 2683, see below:–
1149	52-43	The Queen Mother	1989	1989–2004	Thurso	2 x 3408TA (500)	(Note: Legacy of Miss S. S. Gray, plus RNLI funds, built by Halmatic / William Osborne, costing £540,514.) Sold 2009. Renamed Ederra 4, with Montevideo Pilot Association, Uruguay, August 2024.
1149	52-43	The Queen Mother	1989	2004–2006	Longhope	2 x 3408TA (500)	Sold 2009. Renamed Ederra 4, with Montevideo Pilot Association, Uruguay, August 2024.
1149	52-43	The Queen Mother	1989	2006–2004	Relief fleet	2 x 3408TA (500)	Sold 2009. Renamed Ederra 4, with Montevideo Pilot Association, Uruguay, August 2024.
1150	52-44	Hibernia	1989	1989–2007	Relief fleet	2 x 3408TA (500)	(Note: Funded by the Irish Sailors and Soldiers Land Trust Act, via the Irish Government, built by Halmatic / William Osborne, costing £580,000.) Sold 2007. China SAR Hua Ying 390, see below:–
1159	52-45	Mabel Williams	1990	1990–1998	Ballyglass	2 x 3408TA (500)	(Note: Legacy of Mrs M. Williams, built by Halmatic / Robsons, costing £640,000.) Sold 2007. China SAR Hua Ying 391, see below:–
1159	52-45	Mabel Williams	1990	1998–2001	Relief fleet	2 x 3408TA (500)	Sold 2007. China SAR Hua Ying 391, see below:–
1159	52-45	Mabel Williams	1990	2001–2004	Rosslare Harbour	2 x 3408TA (500)	Sold 2007. China SAR Hua Ying 391, see below:–
1159	52-45	Mabel Williams	1990	2004–2007	Calshot	2 x 3408TA (500)	Sold 2007. China SAR Hua Ying 391, see below:–
1160	52-46	Duke of Atholl	1990	1990–1999	Relief fleet	2 x 3408TA (500)	(Note: Bequest of Sir David Robinson, built by Halmatic / William Osborne, costing £640,000.) Sold 2007. Iceland SAR 2742, see below:–
1160	52-46	Duke of Atholl	1990	1999	Weymouth	2 x 3408TA (500)	Sold 2007. Iceland SAR 2742, see below:–
1160	52-46	Duke of Atholl	1990	1999–2003	Relief fleet	2 x 3408TA (500)	Sold 2007. Iceland SAR 2742, see below:–
1160	52-46	Duke of Atholl	1990	2003–2004	Hartlepool	2 x 3408TA (500)	Sold 2007. Iceland SAR 2742, see below:–
1160	52-46	Duke of Atholl	1990	2004–2007	Relief fleet	2 x 3408TA (500)	Sold 2007. Iceland SAR 2742, see below:–

== Other fleets ==
=== Australia ===
Operated by the Royal Volunteer Coastal Patrol, later Marine Rescue NSW

RNLI ON	Name	In Service	Station	MMSI	Comments
1056	PV Danial Thain PS40	1999–2017	Port Stephens	503277900	Sold 2017. Danial Thain owned by ECA Maritime College based at Scarborough Marina, Brisbane, Queensland, October 2025.
1058	P&O Nedlloyd Encounter	2002–2007	Mosman	503003630	Sold 2013. Renamed Encounter. At Hope Island Marina, Queensland, November 2025.
1058	Ulladulla 30	2007–2013	Ulladula	503003630	Sold 2013. Renamed Encounter. At Hope Island Marina, Queensland, November 2025.

=== Chile ===
Operated by Bote Salvavidas de Valparaiso, Chile

RNLI ON	I.D.	Name	In Service	Station	Comments
1051	CB-8891	Capitan Eduardo Simpson Roth	1998–2018	Valparaíso	Sold 2018. Last reported as a workboat in Chile, December 2018.

=== China ===
Up to date information is currently unavailable from China.

RNLI ON	Name	In service	Station	MMSI	Comments
1081	Hua Ying 393	2006–	Fuzhou		
1082	Hua Ying 398	2005–	Donghai, Shanghai	413770296	Xiamen
1093	Hua Ying 396	2006–	Shenzhen	100880564	Last Seen 29 July 2021 Beihai
1098	Hua Ying 397	2006–	Zhangjiang		
1106	Hua Ying 395	2006–	Dalian		
1107	Hua Ying 394	2006–	Dalian		
1123	Hua Ying 399	2006–	Wenzhou, Zhejiang	413770297	Last seen 9 April 2018 Wenzhou
1143	Hua Ying 392	2006–	Shantou		
1150	Hua Ying 390	2007–	Waigaoqiao	413770293	Last Seen 17 October 2025 Lianyungang
1159	Hua Ying 391	2007–	Donghai	413770294	Still active, 30 November 2025 Taiwan Strait

=== Faroe Islands ===
Operated by Norðoya Bjargingarfelag

RNLI ON	I.D.	Name	In service	Station	MMSI	Comments
1103	XPZX	Ziska	2005–2023	Klaksvik	231393000	Replaced by a new Ziska, 2023. Renamed Arun, and retained as backup craft. Listed For Sale, November 2025.
1103	XPZX	Arun	2023–2025	Tórshavn (Relief fleet)	231393000	Replaced by a new Ziska, 2023. Renamed Arun, and retained as backup craft. Listed For Sale, November 2025.

=== Finland ===
Operated by the Finnish Lifeboat Institution

RNLI ON	Name	In service	Station	MMSI	Comments
1049	PR Mac Elliot	1999–2013	Porkkala	273349590	Sold 2014. Renamed Barrakuda. Hydrographic survey boat, Kronstadt, St Petersburg, Russia, November 2025
1059	Arvinsilmä	2001–2002	Hanko	273296760	Renamed Russarö in 2002
1059	Russarö	2002–2013	Hanko	273296760	Sold November 2013. Renamed Murena, to Russia for SAR operations.
1076	PR Torbay	2002–	Kaskinen	230983310	
1086	PR Hebe	2003–2019	Kemi	276010130	Sold 2020 to the Estonian Rescue Services Agency
1086	PR Hebe	2013–2020	Hanko	276010130	Sold 2020 to the Estonian Rescue Services Agency
1099	PR Janne Malén	2002–	Uusikaupunki	230983340	

=== Russia ===
RNLI ON	Name	In service	Station	MMSI	Comments
1059	Murena	2014–2022	Kronstadt	273296760	Modernized and renamed in 2014. Sold November 2022. Pleasure Vessel at Sea of Azov, August 2024

=== Estonia ===
Operated by the Estonian Rescue Services Agency

RNLI ON	Name	In service	Station	MMSI	Comments
1086	Habe 1	2020–2025	Hundipea, Estonia	276010130	Reported for sale, November 2025.

=== Iceland ===
The Slysavarnafélagið Landsbjörg (Icelandic Association for Search and Rescue) was founded in 1999 after merging the Slysavarnafélag Íslands (National Life-saving Association of Iceland) and Landsbjörg (Association of rescue teams) and has responsibility for rescue operations in Iceland. The Slysavarnafélagið Landsbjörg (ICE-SAR) is divided into both land and sea rescue teams and with main office in Reykjavík. ICE-SAR has a fleet of all weather lifeboats, FRC and rescue boats around the coast of Iceland.

RNLI ON	Reg. No. (Note: Reg No. is the Icelandic Vessel Registration number, always remains with the boat)	Name (Note: Changes when boat assigned to different port)	In service	Station	MMSI	Comments
1050	2310	Oddur V. Gíslason	1998–2007	Grindavík	251404110	Sold 2016. Renamed Valur, Fish Farm Support Vessel, Iceland; Sold 2023. Renamed The Lady, at Hafnarfjörður, September 2025.
1050	2310	Hannes Þ Hafsteinn	2007–2014	Sandgerði	251404110	Sold 2016. Renamed Valur, Fish Farm Support Vessel, Iceland; Sold 2023. Renamed The Lady, at Hafnarfjörður, September 2025.
1050	2310	Jón Oddgeir	2014–2015	Reykjavík	251404110	Sold 2016. Renamed Valur, Fish Farm Support Vessel, Iceland; Sold 2023. Renamed The Lady, at Hafnarfjörður, September 2025.
1053	2542	Björg	2002–2019	Rif	244547000	Sold 2020. Renamed Proteus, Dive, Support & Rescue Vessel, Tender and Marine Services, Waspik, NL, September 2025.
1057	2541	Ásgrímur St. Björnsson	2002–2021	Reykjavík	251275110	Formerly in use by Ársæll SAR team. Sold 2022. Owned by Tender and Marine Services, Waspik, NL, Stored Hafnarfjörður, April 2024.
1061	2474	Gunnar Friðriksson	2000–2008	Njarðvík	–	Relief fleet from March 2008. Out of Service 2011. Reported damaged beyond repair, disposed of 2015.
1061	2474	Jón Oddgeir	2008–2011	Reykjavík	–	Relief fleet from March 2008. Out of Service 2011. Reported damaged beyond repair, disposed of 2015.
1078	2593	Einar Sigurjónsson	2003–2014	Hafnarfjörður	231874000	Sold 2023. Renamed Herborg, Pilot Boat, Tórshavn, Faroe Islands, November 2025.
1078	2593	Hannes Þ Hafsteinn	2015–2023	Sandgerði	231874000	Sold 2023. Renamed Herborg, Pilot Boat, Tórshavn, Faroe Islands, November 2025.
1100	2743	Oddur V. Gíslason	2007–	Grindavík	251811110	Steel Hull
1108	2638	Ingibjörg	2005–2025	Höfn	251363110	Formerly with the Björgunarfélag Hornafjarðar, SAR team. Reported for sale, December 2025
1113	2629	Hafbjörg	2004–2021	Neskaupstaður	251169740	
1113	2629	Ásgrímur St. Björnsson	2021–2023	Reykjavík	251169740	
1113	2629	Hannes Þ Hafsteinn	2023–	Sandgerði	251169740	
1118	2623	Gunnbjörg	2004–	Raufarhöfn	251448110	Replacement for ON 1070 lost on passage
1134	2679	Sveinbjörn Sveinsson	2006–	Vopnafjörður	251545110	
1135	2681	Vörður II	2006–	Patreksfjörður	251778110	
1136	2637	Húnabjörg	2005–	Skagaströnd	251169840	
1144	2683	Sigurvin	2006–2023	Siglufjörður	–	Sold 2023. Renamed Kuummiit, workboat in Greenland, March 2023.
1160	2742	Gunnar Friðriksson	2008–2019	Ísafjörður	251297110	Reported breaking for spares, December 2025.
1160	2742	Björg	2019–2025	Rif	251297110	Reported breaking for spares, December 2025.

=== Madeira ===
Operated by SANAS Madeira

RNLI ON	Name	In service	Station	MMSI	Comments
1067	Ryan Wins, Guardião dos Mares	2003–2006	Santa Cruz	–	On hardstanding at Santa Cruz since 2006 undergoing restoration, September 2025.
1077	Salvador do Mar	2003–2018	Santa Cruz	255670650	On hardstanding at Santa Cruz. Last operational 2018, undergoing restoration, September 2025.

=== Greece ===
The Greek boats were built in Greece by MotoMarine with GRP hulls. Ten are in service with the Hellenic Coast Guard.

=== Canada ===
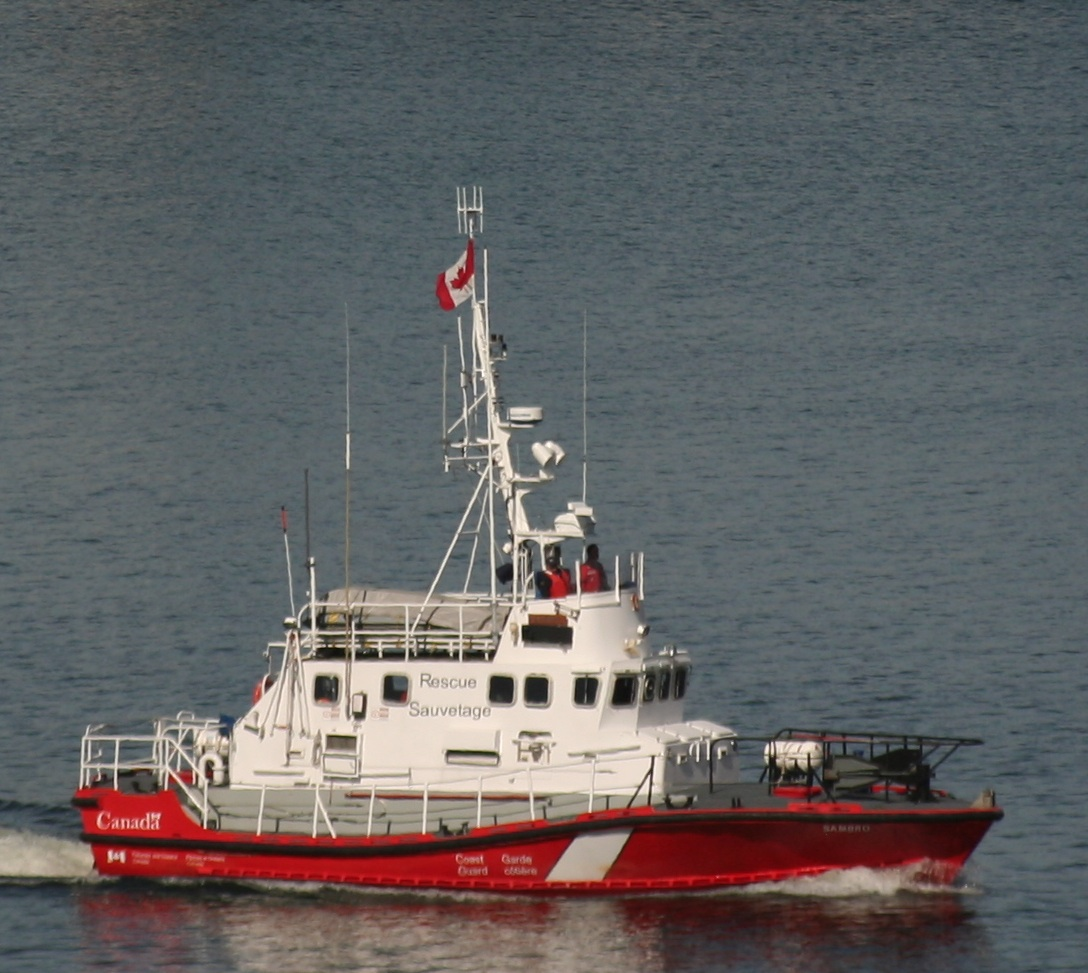
CCGS Sambro

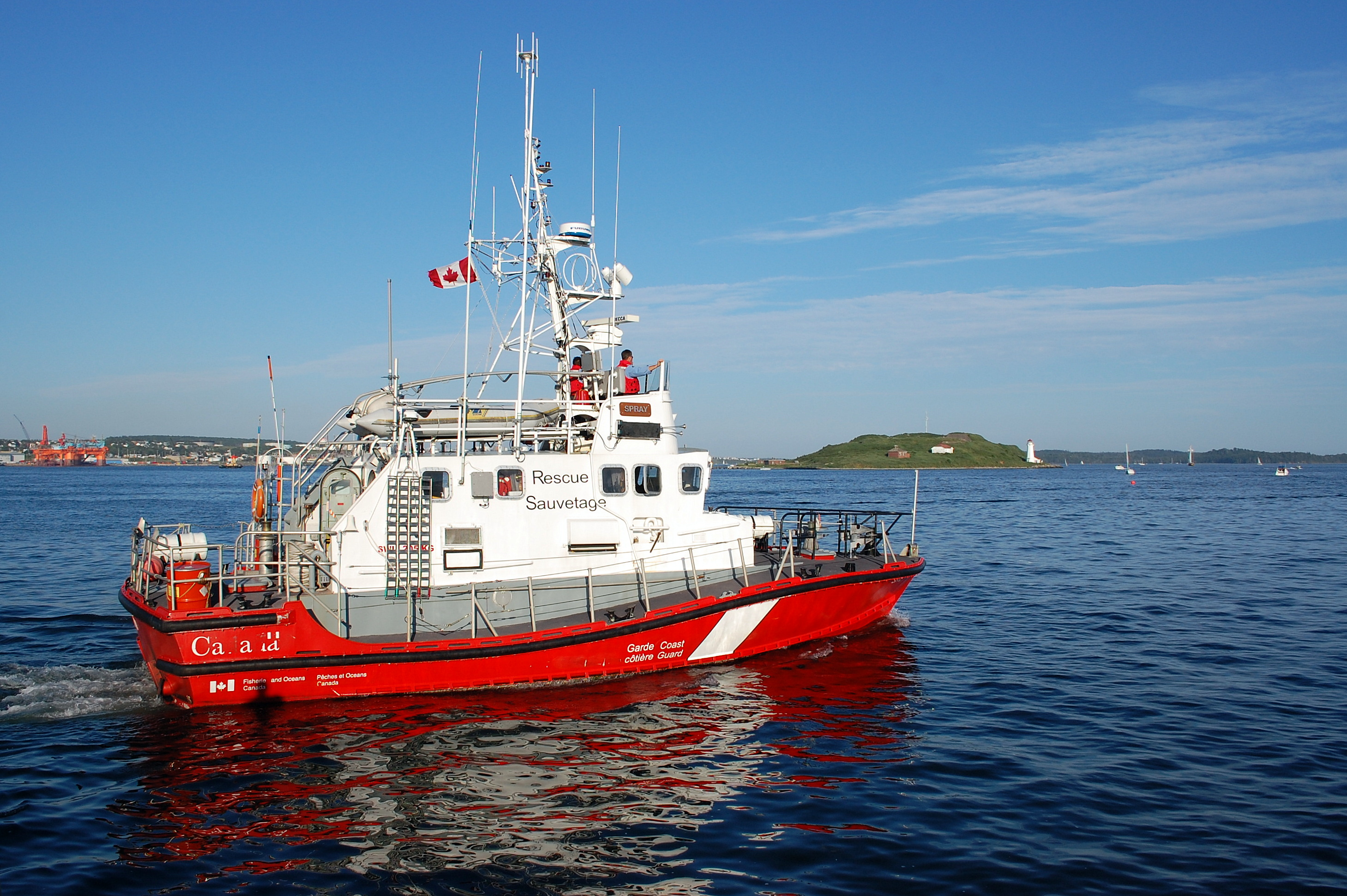
CCGS Spray

Ten 15.77-metre (51.7 ft) boats were built for the Canadian Coast Guard between 1989 and 1996.

The first, a GRP-hulled British-built prototype (CCGS Bickerton) was built by Halmatic, Southampton.

The remaining nine boats were all built in Canada, by Industrie Raymond Ltée of Sept-Iles, Quebec; East Isle Shipyard Ltd. of Georgetown, Prince Edward Island; and Hike Metals & Shipbuilding Ltd. of Wheatley, Ontario, all with aluminium hulls. They are considered "high endurance" lifeboats staffed by a crew of four.

The Canadian Coast Guard also maintains approximately three dozen smaller Cape-class motor lifeboats. They are considered "medium endurance" lifeboats.

CCGS ON	Name	Call Sign	In service	Station	MMSI	Comments
825043	Bickerton	CG3011	1989–2022	Bickerton East, NS	316001619	Decommissioned. November 2023, at Samsons shipyard, Petit De Grat in Cape Breton, For Sale
815532	Spindrift	CG2260	1992–2023	Louisbourg, NS	316001785	November 2023, Training vessel at the Canadian Coast Guard College, in Sydney, Nova Scotia.
816536	Spray	CGVF	1994–2023; 2023–	Dartmouth, NS; Relief fleet	316001617	
816537	Courtney Bay	CG2240	1994–2023; 2023–	Saint John, NB; Relief fleet	316001621	
817948	W. Jackman	CG3068	1994–2023	Burin, NL	316003310	November 2023, For Sale
817949	W.G. George	CG3064	1994–	Burgeo, NL	316001367	Training vessel at the Canadian Coast Guard College, in Sydney, Nova Scotia.
819269	Clark's Harbour	CG2612	1995–2023	Clark's Harbour, NS	316001616	November 2023, at Canadian Coast Guard College, in Sydney, Nova Scotia, For Sale / Breaking for spares.
819270	Cap Aux Meules	CG2682	1996–2023; 2023–	Cap-aux-Meules, QC; Relief fleet	316001604	
819305	Sambro	CG2613	1996–2023; 2023–	Sambro, NS; Relief fleet	316001601	
820275	Westport	CG2388	1996–	Westport, NS	316001892	

== See also ==
- Royal National Lifeboat Institution lifeboats
