= Gerfalcon =

British motor vessel and Dunkirk Little Ship

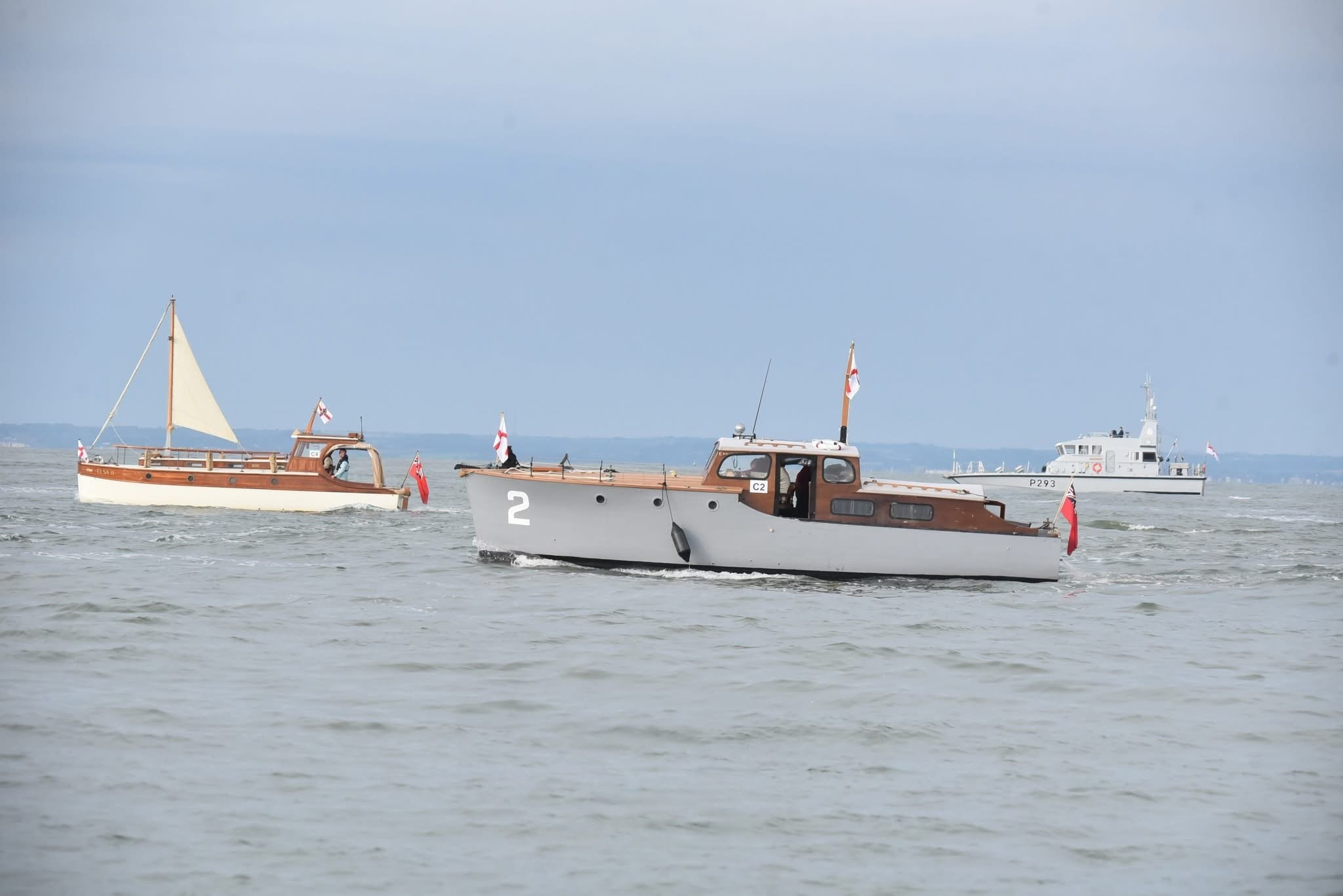

History

United Kingdom
- Name: Gerfalcon
- Owner: Various private owners, currently Gary Fletcher
- Operator: Privately operated
- Port of registry: London
- Route: Southern coast, Portsmouth and Dorset excursions, private charters
- Builder: William Osborne, Littlehampton
- Yard number: 192
- Launched: 1937
- Completed: 1937
- In service: 1937
- Out of service: Active (preserved)
- Identification: Official Number: 166149; Code Letters 2ILL3
- Fate: Preserved as a historic vessel

General characteristics
- Class & type: Motor Yacht
- Length: 34 ft (10 m)
- Beam: 9 ft (2.7 m)
- Decks: 1
- Installed power: 2 x BMC 1.5 diesel engines
- Propulsion: Twin screws
- Capacity: 6 passengers (current configuration)

Gerfalcon is a historic motor vessel built in 1937 by William Osbourne, Littlehampton. Notably, she participated in the Dunkirk evacuation during World War II, where she played a role as one of the "Little Ships." Today, Gerfalcon is preserved as a National Historic Vessel undergoing restoration.

== History ==
=== Construction and early years ===
Gerfalcon was ordered by Valentine Searles-Wood of the Royal Navy and launched in 1937 as a private motor yacht, constructed by William Osbourne, Littlehampton as vessel 192. She was built to the highest standards, reflecting the quality and craftsmanship associated with her builders. Initially, Gerfalcon was used for pleasure cruising along the British coast.

=== World War II service ===
With the outbreak of World War II in 1939, Gerfalcon was requisitioned by the Admiralty to assist in the war effort. In 1940, she was one of the hundreds of civilian vessels called upon to participate in Operation Dynamo, the mass evacuation of British and Allied troops from Dunkirk, France. During this operation, Gerfalcon made multiple trips across the English Channel, helping to rescue soldiers stranded on the beaches.

Following her service at Dunkirk, Gerfalcon continued to serve in various capacities throughout the war, including coastal patrol and transport duties in the Royal Naval Patrol Service as an Auxiliary Patrol Craft.

=== Post-war years ===
After the war, Gerfalcon was returned to her owners and refitted for civilian use. She was restored as a motor yacht and was used for private cruising. Over the years, she has passed through several owners, each of whom has contributed to her upkeep and preservation.

=== Preservation and current use ===
- Gerfalcon is now recognised as a vessel of historic significance, listed on the National Historic Ships UK Register. She is also a member of the Association of Dunkirk Little Ships (ADLS), participating in regular commemorative events, including the annual Thames Traditional Boat Festival and the Dunkirk anniversary cruises.

Today, Gerfalcon is in very poor condition but is being carefully restored by her current owner Gary Fletcher.

== Flags and ensigns ==
=== Special flag honours ===
Gerfalcon is an accredited member of the Association of Dunkirk Little Ships (ADLS), comprising vessels that participated in the 1940 Dunkirk evacuation, known as Operation Dynamo. These historic vessels are granted the honour of flying a distinctive house flag: the Cross of St George defaced with the Arms of DunkirkBlue Ensign. This privilege was conferred with the approval of the Admiralty, the College of Heralds, and the City of Dunkirk.

When sailing in company, ADLS vessels may also fly the undefaced Cross of St George at the bow. To prevent any confusion with the presence of a Royal Navy Admiral—who traditionally flies the same flag—the vessels simultaneously fly the Red Ensign at the stern. This combination signifies the vessel's civilian status and its honoured role in the Dunkirk evacuation.

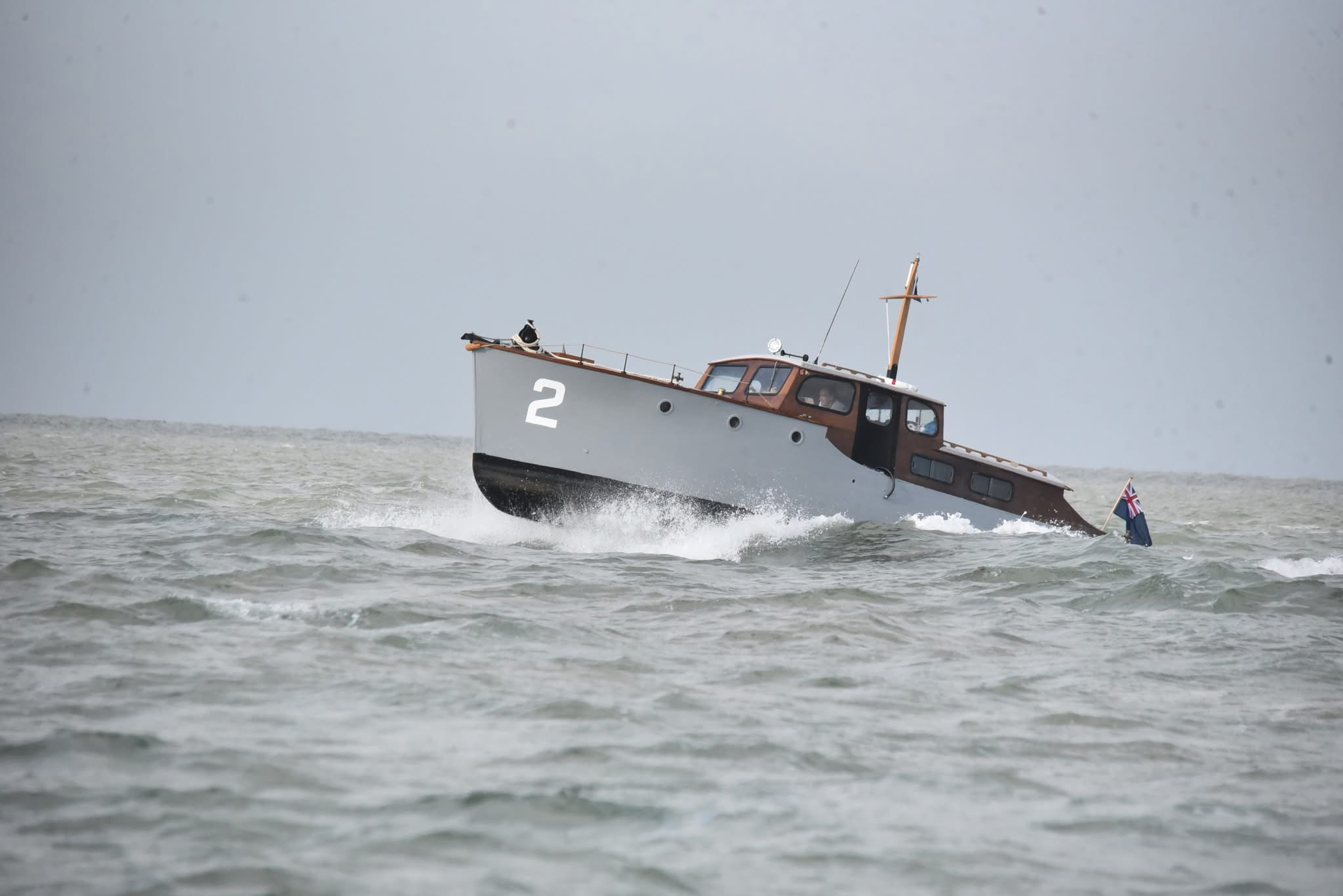

=== Occasional use of the Blue Ensign ===
The master of Gerfalcon, a retired Lieutenant, who holds warrants authorising the display of the Blue Ensign. This ensign, characterised by a dark blue field with the Union Flag in the canton, is traditionally reserved for specific categories of British vessels.

== 2025 return to Dunkirk ==
In May 2025, Gerfalcon participated in the 85th anniversary commemorations of Operation Dynamo, joining a fleet of 66 historic vessels—known as the "Little Ships"—that sailed from Ramsgate to Dunkirk. The event, organised by the Association of Dunkirk Little Ships (ADLS), marked the first official return crossing since 2015, with the 2020 voyage having been cancelled due to the COVID-19 pandemic.

Departing Ramsgate Royal Harbour at 06:00 BST on 21 May 2025, the flotilla was escorted across the English Channel by Royal Navy patrol vessels and RNLI lifeboats. The voyage served as a tribute to the bravery and sacrifice of those who took part in the 1940 evacuation.

Gerfalcon’s inclusion in the 2025 crossing was particularly notable as it marked her first major voyage following an extensive seven-month restoration. Under new ownership from July 2024, the vessel underwent a comprehensive refit, which included the replacement of 32 hull planks and 22 deck beams, as well as a new deck, wheelhouse, and cabin. She was restored in her wartime Royal Naval Patrol Service colours and returned to sea trials before embarking on the commemorative voyage.

During the return to Dunkirk, Gerfalcon covered over 200 nautical miles, successfully completing her maiden post-restoration passage and reaffirming her seaworthiness.

The 2025 crossing was also significant as it was the first without any surviving Dunkirk veterans present.
