= Waveney-class lifeboat =

Former RNLI lifeboat class

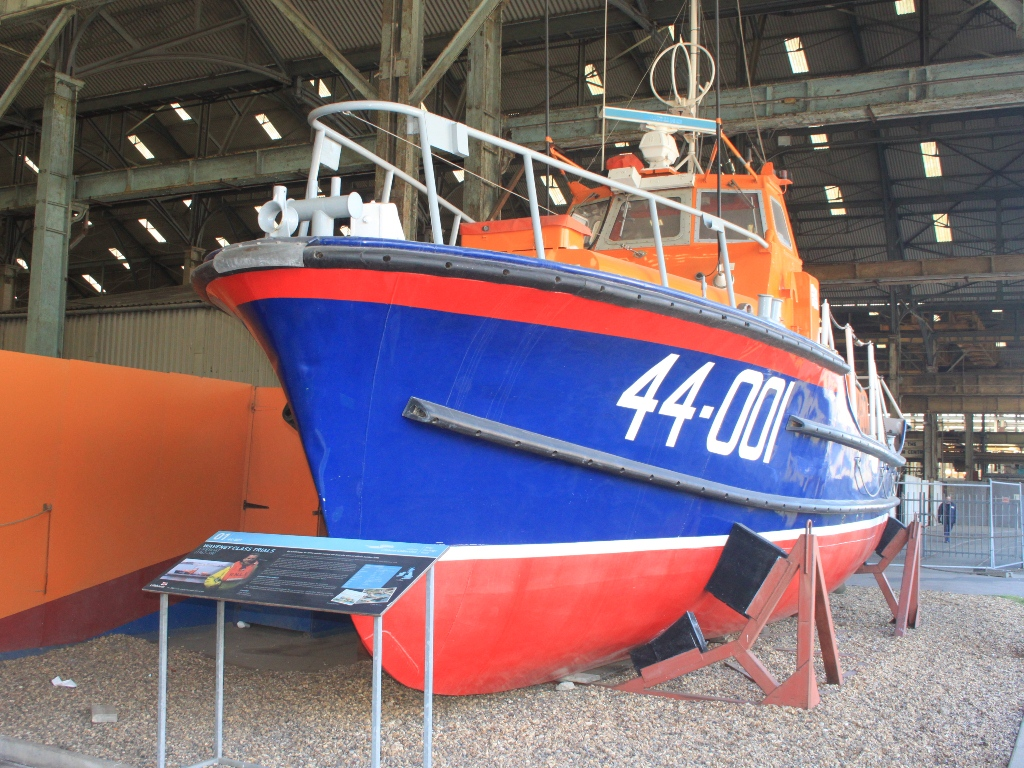
- Falmouth lifeboat 44-001, now in the RNLI Heritage Collection at Chatham Historic Dockyard.

Class overview
- Builders: USCG, Curtis Bay, USA (44-001); Brooke Marine, Lowestoft (44-002 – 007); Groves & Guttridge, Cowes (44-008 – 015); Bideford Ship Yard (44-016 – 019); Fairey Allday Marine, Cowes (44-020 – 022)
- Operators: Royal National Lifeboat Institution; Royal Volunteer Coastal Patrol, Australia; Royal NZ Coastguard Federation; Sea Rescue Institute of Namibia; Canadian Lifeboat Institution; ADES Uruguay
- Preceded by: Rother, Solent
- Succeeded by: Arun, Mersey, Trent, Tyne
- Built: 1964–1982
- In service: 1964–1999
- Completed: 22
- Retired: 22
- Preserved: 1

General characteristics
- Type: motor lifeboat
- Displacement: 18–19 tons
- Length: 44 ft 10 in (13.67 m)
- Beam: 12 ft 8 in (3.86 m)
- Draught: 4 ft 2 in (1.27 m)
- Propulsion: Two diesel engines (various models)
- Speed: 15.4 knots (17.7 mph)
- Range: 190 nautical miles (350 km)
- Crew: 5

The Waveney-class lifeboat was the first class of lifeboats operated by the Royal National Lifeboat Institution (RNLI) capable of operating at speeds in excess of 10 knots (12 mph). Based on an American design, 22 saw operational service between 1964 and 1999 at the RNLI's stations around the coast of the United Kingdom and Ireland. After being superseded by faster boats in the 1990s, many were sold for further use with lifeboat services abroad, notably in Australia and New Zealand.

The class name comes from the River Waveney, which discharges into the North Sea at Great Yarmouth.

== History ==
In the 1960s the RNLI's fleet consisted of motor lifeboats of limited speed due to the shape of their hulls. The United States Coast Guard (USCG) had developed a 44-foot motor lifeboat which planed across the surface of the water, the consequence of which is a reduced 'wetted' surface area to the hull, and therefore a much higher speed. One was built for the RNLI by the USCG in Curtis Bay Coast Guard Yard, Maryland, and this was put through extensive trials and proved capable of operating in restricted spaces, even though the propellers lacked the usual protection afforded to lifeboats.

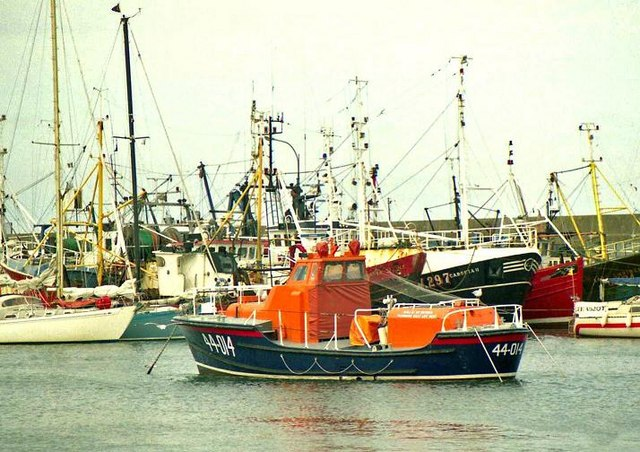
The Waveney-class lifeboat 44-014 St Patrick (ON 1035) at Dunmore East

The prototype was never given a name although the crews nicknamed it "The Yank". It entered trials in 1964 but the first production boats did not start to emerge until 1967. After six had been placed in service, there was a hiatus which lasted until 1974 when production was restarted, which then continued through until 1982, by which time 22 were in service. The entire fleet was replaced between 1996 and 1999 as new Trent-class and Severn-class lifeboats came into service, but many were sold for further use as lifeboats or pilot boats.

The boats launched in 1967 and 1968 were built by Brooke Marine at Lowestoft and those in 1974/75 by Groves and Gutteridge in Cowes. The 1976/77 batch came from Bideford Ship Yard and the last three from Fairey Marine in Cowes.

Two 50-foot (15 m) long versions were built, as the first of a proposed fleet of Thames-class lifeboats, but the class was cancelled in favour of the Arun-class lifeboat, with a different hull shape and improved crew facilities.

== Description ==
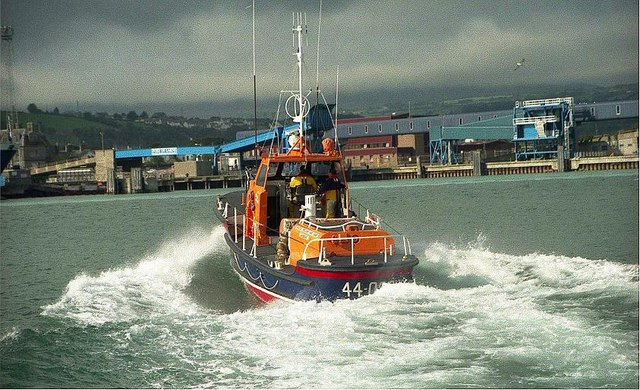
Larne lifeboat 44-022 William and Jane (ON 1079) in October 1997

The steel hull is 44 feet 10 inches (13.67 m) long and 12 feet 8 inches (3.86 m) wide, drawing 4 feet 2 inches (1.27 m) of water. The boat was designed with a 'semi-planing' hull, allowing the hull to lift under power, giving a far greater than a conventional displacement hull. Due to the hull design, the Waveney was only suitable for stations where the boat could remain afloat.

The hull is divided into seven watertight compartments including two survivor compartments and a crew space.

The coxswain operates the boat seated in an open but protected wheelhouse, with the remainder of the crew seated inside the cabin. Powered by a pair of diesel engines, the Waveney-class lifeboat had an operating radius of 95 nautical miles (176 km).

== Engines ==
- 2 x Cummins V6 diesel engine 200 bhp (150 kW)
- 2 x Cummins V6 diesel engine 215 bhp (160 kW)
- 2 x 6.96 L (425 cu in) Detroit Diesel Series 53 GM 8V53 2-stroke V8 diesel 250 bhp (190 kW)
- 2 x 6.2 L (380 cu in) (Ford 2704C) Mermaid 595T 4-cyl turbo-charged diesel 250 bhp (190 kW)
- 2 x 10.4 L (630 cu in) Caterpillar 3208T turbo-charged diesel 250 bhp (190 kW)

40-001 was built with twin 200 bhp (150 kW) Cummins V6 engines, which were replaced in 1973, with the 250 bhp (190 kW) Ford Mermaid 595T 6-cylinder engines. These too were replaced in 1982, with the 250 bhp (190 kW) Caterpillar 3208T

40-002 – 40-007 were all built by Brooke Marine, and featured twin 215 bhp (160 kW) Cummins V6 engines. These were all replaced between 1979 and 1983 with the Caterpillar 3208T

Groves and Guttridge of Cowes built the next eight boats (40-008 – 40-015), all equipped with the 250 bhp (190 kW) General Motors 8V53, which were never replaced.

Four further boats (44-016 – 44-019), built by Bideford Shipyard, were given the 250 bhp (190 kW) Ford Mermaid 595T, with all engines being replaced between 1978 and 1982, with the 250 bhp (190 kW) Caterpillar 3208T.

Finally, the last three boats, (44-020 – 44-022), built by Fairey Allday Marine, received the Caterpillar 3208T from new.

== RNLI fleet ==
ON (Note: ON is the RNLI's Official Number of the boat.)	Op.No. (Note: Op.No. is the RNLI's Operational Number of the boat carried on the hull.)	Name	Built	In service	Station	Comments
–	44-001	Unnamed	1964	1964–1996	Falmouth	Preserved in RNLI Heritage Collection at Chatham Historic Dockyard.
1001	44-002	John F. Kennedy	1966	1967–1990	Dún Laoghaire	(Note: ON 1001. Legacy of Miss Gibson, built by Brooke Marine, costing £33,000.); Sold 1996. Renamed Sarah JFK. Last reported as Fortitude, Charter Boat, Lagos, Nigeria, October 2019.
1001	44-002	John F. Kennedy	1966	1990–1996	Relief fleet	Sold 1996. Renamed Sarah JFK. Last reported as Fortitude, Charter Boat, Lagos, Nigeria, October 2019.
1002	44-003	Khami	1967	1967–1980	Great Yarmouth and Gorleston	(Note: ON 1002. Gift of Mr and Mrs Bedwell, built by Brooke Marine, costing £33,361.); Sold in 1999 to RVCP Australia, See below:–
1002	44-003	Khami	1967	1980–1990	Relief fleet	Sold in 1999 to RVCP Australia, See below:–
1002	44-003	Khami	1967	1990	Ramsgate	Sold in 1999 to RVCP Australia, See below:–
1002	44-003	Khami	1967	1990–1997	Relief fleet	Sold in 1999 to RVCP Australia, See below:–
1003	44-004	Faithful Forrester	1967	1967–1979	Dover	(Note: ON 1003. Gift of the Ancient Order of Foresters, built by Brooke Marine, costing £35,000.); Sold in 1999 to RVCP Australia, See below:–
1003	44-004	Faithful Forrester	1967	1979–1984	Relief fleet	Sold in 1999 to RVCP Australia, See below:–
1003	44-004	Faithful Forrester	1967	1984–1985	Holyhead	Sold in 1999 to RVCP Australia, See below:–
1003	44-004	Faithful Forrester	1967	1985–1997	Relief fleet	Sold in 1999 to RVCP Australia, See below:–
1004	44-005	Margaret Graham	1967	1967–1980	Harwich	(Note: ON 1004. Funded by an anonymous gift, built by Brooke Marine, costing £37,838.); Sold 1999. Renamed St Hilda of Whitby. Unaltered Pilot boat at Whitby, July 2024.
1004	44-005	Margaret Graham	1967	1980–1986	Relief fleet	Sold 1999. Renamed St Hilda of Whitby. Unaltered Pilot boat at Whitby, July 2024.
1004	44-005	Margaret Graham	1967	1986–1999	Amble	Sold 1999. Renamed St Hilda of Whitby. Unaltered Pilot boat at Whitby, July 2024.
1005	44-006	Arthur and Blanche Harris	1968	1968–1974	Barry Dock	(Note: ON 1005. Legacy of Mrs Harris, built by Brooke Marine, costing £35,000.); Sold in 1999 to RVCP Australia. See below:–
1005	44-006	Arthur and Blanche Harris	1968	1974–1979	Relief fleet	Sold in 1999 to RVCP Australia. See below:–
1005	44-006	Arthur and Blanche Harris	1968	1979–1985	Donaghadee	Sold in 1999 to RVCP Australia. See below:–
1005	44-006	Arthur and Blanche Harris	1968	1985–1993	Relief fleet	Sold in 1999 to RVCP Australia. See below:–
1005	44-006	Arthur and Blanche Harris	1968	1993–1995	Courtmacsherry Harbour	Sold in 1999 to RVCP Australia. See below:–
1005	44-006	Arthur and Blanche Harris	1968	1995–1996	Relief fleet	Sold in 1999 to RVCP Australia. See below:–
1006	44-007	Connel Elizabeth Cargill	1967	1968–1985	Troon	(Note: ON 1006. Gift of the 'W. A. Cargill Charitable Trust', built by Brooke Marine, costing £34,386.); Sold in 1999 to RVCP Australia. See below:–
1006	44-007	Connel Elizabeth Cargill	1967	1986–1990	Arklow	Sold in 1999 to RVCP Australia. See below:–
1006	44-007	Connel Elizabeth Cargill	1967	1990–1991	Relief fleet	Sold in 1999 to RVCP Australia. See below:–
1006	44-007	Connel Elizabeth Cargill	1967	1991	Portree	Sold in 1999 to RVCP Australia. See below:–
1006	44-007	Connel Elizabeth Cargill	1967	1991–1997	Relief fleet	Sold in 1999 to RVCP Australia. See below:–
1026	44-008	Eric Seal (Civil Service No. 36)	1974	1974–1996	Eyemouth	(Note: ON 1026. Gift of the Civil Service LB Fund, built by Groves and Guttridge of Cowes, costing £100,000.); Sold in 1999 to Sea Rescue Institute, Namibia. See below:–
1027	144-009	Helen Turnbull	1974	1974–1996	Sheerness	(Note: ON 1027. Legacy of Mr Turnbull, plus the 'Medway LB Appeal', built by Groves and Guttridge of Cowes, costing £100,000.); Sold 1999. Renamed Badger, later Sturm, 2019. Last reported at Bowling Basin, Bowling, West Dunbartonshire, May 2023.
1027	144-009	Helen Turnbull	1974	1996–1997	Achill Island	Sold 1999. Renamed Badger, later Sturm, 2019. Last reported at Bowling Basin, Bowling, West Dunbartonshire, May 2023.
1027	144-009	Helen Turnbull	1974	1997	Relief fleet	Sold 1999. Renamed Badger, later Sturm, 2019. Last reported at Bowling Basin, Bowling, West Dunbartonshire, May 2023.
1028	44-010	Thomas Forehead and Mary Rowse II	1974	1974–1987	Plymouth	(Note: ON 1028. Legacy of Mr T. Field, built by Groves and Guttridge of Cowes, costing £100,000.); Sold in 1999 to the Royal New Zealand Coastguard Federation. See below:–
1028	44-010	Thomas Forehead and Mary Rowse II	1974	1987–1996	Fowey	Sold in 1999 to the Royal New Zealand Coastguard Federation. See below:–
1028	44-010	Thomas Forehead and Mary Rowse II	1974	1996–1997	Relief fleet	Sold in 1999 to the Royal New Zealand Coastguard Federation. See below:–
1029	44-011	Augustine Courtauld	1974	1974–1983	Poole	(Note: ON 1029. Gift of Mr W. P. Courtauld, plus the 'Mayor of Poole's LB Appeal, built by Groves and Guttridge of Cowes, costing £81,000.); Sold in 1999 to RVCP Australia. See below:–
1029	44-011	Augustine Courtauld	1974	1983–1985	Relief fleet	Sold in 1999 to RVCP Australia. See below:–
1029	44-011	Augustine Courtauld	1974	1985–1987	Troon	Sold in 1999 to RVCP Australia. See below:–
1029	44-011	Augustine Courtauld	1974	1987–1988	Plymouth	Sold in 1999 to RVCP Australia. See below:–
1029	44-011	Augustine Courtauld	1974	1988–1990	Relief fleet	Sold in 1999 to RVCP Australia. See below:–
1029	44-011	Augustine Courtauld	1974	1990–1997	Arklow	Sold in 1999 to RVCP Australia. See below:–
1033	44-012	The White Rose of Yorkshire	1974	1974–1988	Whitby	(Note: ON 1033. Gift of Mrs G. Milburn, built by Groves and Guttridge of Cowes, costing £81,000.); Sold in 1999 to the Canadian Lifeboat Institution. See below:–
1033	44-012	The White Rose of Yorkshire	1974	1988–1996	Invergordon	Sold in 1999 to the Canadian Lifeboat Institution. See below:–
1033	44-012	The White Rose of Yorkshire	1974	1996–1997	Relief fleet	Sold in 1999 to the Canadian Lifeboat Institution. See below:–
1034	44-013	Thomas James King	1975	1975–1989	St Helier	(Note: ON 1034. Funded by the 'Jersey LB Appeal', built by Groves and Guttridge of Cowes, costing £100,000.); Sold 1998. Renamed Northesk, Pilot boat at Montrose. Sold April 2022. Renamed Ledra Express. Workboat for Ledra Ena Shipping, Limassol, Cyprus, October 2025.
1034	44-013	Thomas James King	1975	1989–1993	Relief fleet	Sold 1998. Renamed Northesk, Pilot boat at Montrose. Sold April 2022. Renamed Ledra Express. Workboat for Ledra Ena Shipping, Limassol, Cyprus, October 2025.
1034	44-013	Thomas James King	1975	1993–1995	Dunbar	Sold 1998. Renamed Northesk, Pilot boat at Montrose. Sold April 2022. Renamed Ledra Express. Workboat for Ledra Ena Shipping, Limassol, Cyprus, October 2025.
1034	44-013	Thomas James King	1975	1995–1997	Relief fleet	Sold 1998. Renamed Northesk, Pilot boat at Montrose. Sold April 2022. Renamed Ledra Express. Workboat for Ledra Ena Shipping, Limassol, Cyprus, October 2025.
1035	44-014	St Patrick	1975	1975–1996	Dunmore East	(Note: ON 1035. Funded by the 'Irish LB Appeal', built by Groves and Guttridge of Cowes, costing £100,000.); Sold in 1999 to RVCP Australia. See below:–
1036	44-015	Lady of Lancashire	1975	1976–1989	Fleetwood	(Note: ON 1036. Funded by an anonymous gift, built by Groves and Guttridge of Cowes, costing £130,000.); Sold 1996. Renamed St Boisil, Pilot boat at Berwick-on-Tweed. Sold August 2022. At Berwick-on-Tweed, November 2025.
1036	44-015	Lady of Lancashire	1975	1990–1995	Dún Laoghaire	Sold 1996. Renamed St Boisil, Pilot boat at Berwick-on-Tweed. Sold August 2022. At Berwick-on-Tweed, November 2025.
1036	44-015	Lady of Lancashire	1975	1995–1996	Relief fleet	Sold 1996. Renamed St Boisil, Pilot boat at Berwick-on-Tweed. Sold August 2022. At Berwick-on-Tweed, November 2025.
1042	44-016	Ralph and Joy Swann	1976	1976–1990	Ramsgate	(Note: ON 1042. Legacy of Mrs Crathorne, plus RNLI funds, built by Bideford Shipyard, costing £130,000.); Sold July 1998. Renamed West Swann. Used as passenger ferry between West and East Falkland. Sitting derelict on hard standing, West Falkland, December 2025.
1042	44-016	Ralph and Joy Swann	1976	1990–1991	Tobermory	Sold July 1998. Renamed West Swann. Used as passenger ferry between West and East Falkland. Sitting derelict on hard standing, West Falkland, December 2025.
1042	44-016	Ralph and Joy Swann	1976	1991–1996	Portree	Sold July 1998. Renamed West Swann. Used as passenger ferry between West and East Falkland. Sitting derelict on hard standing, West Falkland, December 2025.
1042	44-016	Ralph and Joy Swann	1976	1996–1997	Relief fleet	Sold July 1998. Renamed West Swann. Used as passenger ferry between West and East Falkland. Sitting derelict on hard standing, West Falkland, December 2025.
1042	44-016	Ralph and Joy Swann	1976	1997–1998	Achill Island	Sold July 1998. Renamed West Swann. Used as passenger ferry between West and East Falkland. Sitting derelict on hard standing, West Falkland, December 2025.
1043	44-017	The Nelsons of Donaghadee	1976	1976–1978	Donaghadee	(Note: ON 1043. Funded by the RNLI, built by Bideford Shipyard, costing £130,000.); Renamed Wavy Line in 1979
1043	44-017	The Nelsons of Donaghadee	1976	1978–1979	Relief fleet	Renamed Wavy Line in 1979
1043	44-017	Wavy Line	1976	1979–1990	Relief fleet	(Note: Funded by the 'Wavy Line Grocers Association'.); Sold in 1997 to the Royal New Zealand Coastguard Federation. See below:–
1043	44-017	Wavy Line	1976	1990–1997	Sunderland	Sold in 1997 to the Royal New Zealand Coastguard Federation. See below:–
1044	44-018	The Scout	1977	1977–1997	Hartlepool	(Note: ON 1044. Gift of The Scout Association, built by Bideford Shipyard, costing £122,000.); Sold in 1997 to ADES Uruguay. See below:–
1045	44-019	Louis Marchesi of Round Table	1977	1977–1985	Newhaven	(Note: ON 1045. Gift of the Nat. Assoc. of Round Tables of Gt. Britain and Ireland, built by Bideford Shipyard, costing £150,000.); Sold in 1997 to the Royal New Zealand Coastguard Federation. See below:–
1045	44-019	Louis Marchesi of Round Table	1977	1985–1986	Relief fleet	Sold in 1997 to the Royal New Zealand Coastguard Federation. See below:–
1045	44-019	Louis Marchesi of Round Table	1977	1986–1994	Alderney	Sold in 1997 to the Royal New Zealand Coastguard Federation. See below:–
1045	44-019	Louis Marchesi of Round Table	1977	1994–1996	Exmouth	Sold in 1997 to the Royal New Zealand Coastguard Federation. See below:–
1045	44-019	Louis Marchesi of Round Table	1977	1996–1997	Relief fleet	Sold in 1997 to the Royal New Zealand Coastguard Federation. See below:–
1060	44-020	John Fison	1980	1980–1996	Harwich	(Note: ON 1060. Gift of Mrs Fison and Mrs Knowles-Franks, plus a legacy of Mrs Sutcliffe, built by Fairey Allday Marine, costing £260,000.); Sold in 1997 to the Royal New Zealand Coastguard Federation. See below:–
1060	44-020	John Fison	1980	1996–1999	Relief fleet	Sold in 1997 to the Royal New Zealand Coastguard Federation. See below:–
1065	44-021	Barham	1980	1980–1996	Great Yarmouth and Gorleston	(Note: ON 1065. Legacy of Mr Stringer and Mrs Miles, built by Fairey Allday Marine, costing £260,000.); Sold in 1997 to the Royal New Zealand Coastguard Federation. See below:–
1065	44-021	Barham	1980	1996–1999	Relief fleet	Sold in 1997 to the Royal New Zealand Coastguard Federation. See below:–
1079	44-022	The William and Jane	1982	1982–1995	Blyth	(Note: ON 1079. Legacies of Miss Hewson, Mrs Grey, Mrs Whittaker, Mr Dunn and Mr Rowe, built by Fairey Allday Marine, costing £319,940.); Sold in 1997 to the Royal New Zealand Coastguard Federation. See below:–
1079	44-022	The William and Jane	1982	1996–1999	Larne	Sold in 1997 to the Royal New Zealand Coastguard Federation. See below:–

== Other fleets ==
=== Australia ===
RVCP Royal Volunteer Coastal Patrol was formed in 1937. In 2008 it amalgamated with Australian Volunteer Coast Guard and Volunteer Rescue Association to form Marine Rescue New South Wales.

RNLI ON	Name	In service	Station	Comments
1002	P&O Nedlloyd Stratheden	1999–2011	Brighton le Sands	Sold 2011. Renamed Khami. Private Ownership, Esperance, Western Australia. Sold 2014. Yacht Club Rescue Vessel, Beauty Point, Tasmania, Australia. Restored to RNLI 44-003 livery. Sold 2023. Safety Vessel, Scarborough, Western Australia, September 2024.
1003	P&O Nedlloyd Strathmore	1999–2011	Narooma	Sold 2011. Renamed Harbour Conquest, crew transfer and utility vessel, with Harbour Services Australia, Fremantle. Sold 2018. Last reported at Freemantle, Western Australia, May 2023.
1005	P&O Nedlloyd Strathallan	1999–2007	Ulladulla	Sold 2009. Renamed Harbour Crusader.Crew transfer and utility vessel with Harbour Services Australia, Fremantle. Scrapped, June 2019
1005	P&O Nedlloyd Strathallan	2007–2009	Broken Bay	Sold 2009. Renamed Harbour Crusader.Crew transfer and utility vessel with Harbour Services Australia, Fremantle. Scrapped, June 2019
1006	P&O Nedlloyd Rawalpindi	1999–2011	Mosman	Sold 2011. Workboat/houseboat, Brisbane River, Queensland, Australia. Under restoration, December 2025.
1029	P&O Nedlloyd Strathaird	1999–2002	Broken Bay	Sold 20 May 2011. Renamed Augustine Courtauld, work boat for Melbourne Charter Services P/L, Pier 35 Marina, Melbourne. Restored to RNLI 44-011 livery. Last reported on the hard at Melbourne, February 2025.
1029	P&O Nedlloyd Strathaird	2002–2011	Trial Bay	Sold 20 May 2011. Renamed Augustine Courtauld, work boat for Melbourne Charter Services P/L, Pier 35 Marina, Melbourne. Restored to RNLI 44-011 livery. Last reported on the hard at Melbourne, February 2025.
1035	P&O Nedlloyd Strathnaver	1999–2009	Batemans Bay	Sold 18 October 2009. Renamed St. Patrick Strathnaver, at Mornington Peninsula in Victoria, Australia. Sold 6 October 2022. Last reported under restoration at Somerville, Victoria, Australia, December 2022.

=== New Zealand ===
The Royal New Zealand Coastguard Federation, now Royal New Zealand Coastguard is the primary civilian marine search and rescue organisation for New Zealand. Unlike a number of other countries, the organisation is a non-governmental, civilian charitable organisation, with no enforcement powers.

RNLI ON	Name	In service	Station	Comments
1028	Westgate Rescue (Taranaki Volunteer Coastguard)	2000–2012	Port Taranaki	Sold 2012. Renamed Harrier. Last reported at Fiordland, New Zealand, April 2019
1043	Nicholsons / Trust Porinua Rescue (Mana Volunteer Coastguard)	1998–2010	Mana Island	Sold 2010. Renamed Toucan. Sold 2015, Workboat, Lyttelton, New Zealand. Sold October 2021. Last reported as a workboat, Whanganui River, New Zealand, December 2021.
1045	P&O Nedlloyd Rescue (Waiheke Volunteer Coastguard)	1999–2006	Waiheke Island	Sold 4 May 2006. Renamed Louis Marchesi of Round Table. Sold 20 September 2010. At Northcote Point, Auckland, August 2025.
1060	Hamilton Rotary Rescue (Raglan Volunteer Coastguard)	1999–2005	Raglan	Sold 2006. Renamed Harbour Cruiser, crew transfer and utility vessel, Harbour Services, Fremantle, Australia. Last reported for sale, January 2021.
1065	Barham (Hawkes Bay Volunteer Coastguard)	2000–2003	Napier	Sold 27 June 2003. Renamed Legend at Auckland. Sold 31 January 2008. Last reported at Seaview Marina, Wellington Harbour, New Zealand, October 2015.
1079	John Barton Acland Rescue (Kaikōura Volunteer Coastguard)	1999–2005	Kaikōura	Sold 21 April 2005. Renamed Gryphon, used as a coastal cruising boat, Newport, Oregon, USA, November 2025.

=== Other rescue services ===
RNLI ON	Name	In service	Station	Comments
1026	Spirit of Standard Bank (Sea Rescue Institute of Namibia)	1999–2005	Walvis Bay	Retired from service 2022. Now derelict on hardstanding at Lüderitz, Namibia, November 2025.
1026	Spirit of Standard Bank (Sea Rescue Institute of Namibia)	2005–2022	Lüderitz	Retired from service 2022. Now derelict on hardstanding at Lüderitz, Namibia, November 2025.
1033	1A 001 The White Rose of Yorkshire (Canadian Lifeboat Institution)	1999–2008	Roberts Bank, Vancouver	Sold 2008. Renamed Yorkshire White Rose, at Canoe Pass, Ladner, British Columbia, December 2024.
1044	ADES 16 Montemar (14-016) (ADES Uruguay)	1997–2012	Puerto del Buceo	Sold 2015. Workboat at Puerto Santiago Vázquez, December 2024.

== See also ==
- Royal National Lifeboat Institution lifeboats

== Notes ==
=== Sources ===
- Leonard, Richie; Denton, Tony (2026). Lifeboat Enthusiasts Handbook 2026. Lifeboats Enthusiasts' Society.
- Morris, Jeff (2008). List of British Lifeboats Part 3 (Third ed.). Lifeboat Enthusiasts' Society.

== See also ==
- Histories of the Waveney-class
