= Tobermory Lifeboat Station =

RNLI Lifeboat station in Argyll and Bute, Scotland

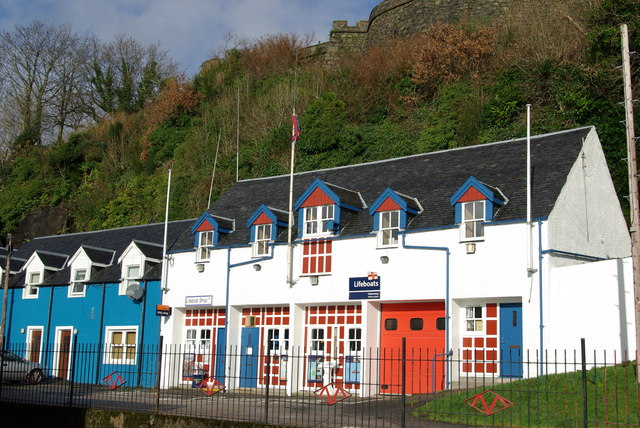
- Tobermory Lifeboat Station

- Location within Mull Location within Argyll and Bute

General information
- Type: RNLI Lifeboat Station
- Location: Tobermory Lifeboat Station, Tobermory, Isle of Mull, PA75 6NU, Scotland
- Coordinates: 56°37′23.8″N 6°03′51.7″W
- Opened: 1938–1947; 1990–present
- Owner: Royal National Lifeboat Institution

Website
- Tobermory RNLI Lifeboat Station

Tobermory Lifeboat Station is located at the end of Main Street in Tobermory, a harbour town sitting at the northern end of the Sound of Mull, on the Isle of Mull, part of the Inner Hebrides, off the west coast of Scotland.

A lifeboat was first placed at Tobermory by the Royal National Lifeboat Institution (RNLI) in 1938, operating until 1947. The station was re-established in 1990.

The station currently operates a Severn-class All-weather lifeboat, 17-39 Elizabeth Fairlie Ramsey (ON 1270), on station since 2003.

== History ==
In 1937, it was decided to place a lifeboat at the town of Tobermory, on the Isle of Mull, a location ideally situated to cover the sea areas of western Scotland. The nine-year-old 40-foot 6in Watson-class lifeboat J. & W. (ON 722) was temporarily placed on station in October 1938.

Meanwhile, the new station boat, a 46-foot Watson-class lifeboat, which had been constructed in early 1938 at Sandbank on Holy Loch, by Alexander Robertson & Sons, had been placed on display at the Empire Exhibition in Glasgow in May 1938, remaining there until October 1938. When the exhibition closed, the boat was dispatched to its new home at Tobermory, stopping at Ardrishaig on Loch Gilp on the voyage, where 300 people took a further opportunity to view the boat. Finally, she transited the Crinan Canal to Tobermory. At a ceremony on 28 November 1938, the boat was named Sir Arthur Rose (ON 801).

The boat had been funded by the late Miss Margaret Lithgow, of Dhunara Castle, on the estate of Glen Gorm, Mull, and who was the sister of the shipbuilder, Sir James Lithgow.

On Sunday 31 March 1940, the steamship Nydalen, on passage from Runcorn to Methil via Kirkwall, ran aground at full speed on a reef at Arinagour, on the island of Coll. She was so far aground, that they couldn't initially launch the ships lifeboats until high water. Tobermory lifeboat Sir Arthur Rose arrived to find Captain Jensen and 13 crew in the lifeboats, sheltering under the stern of the vessel. All 14 men were landed at Arinagour.

HMS Western Isles was a command ship of the Royal Navy during World War II, and was the flagship of the Anti-Submarine Training School based at Tobermory. It is not known who made up the crew of the lifeboat during the period of the war, but it may be no coincidence that after the withdrawal of HMS Western Isles from Tobermory, and the departure of Naval personnel, by 1947, Tobermory lifeboat station was experiencing great difficulty maintaining a crew. In December 1947, Tobermory station was closed, and the lifeboat was transferred to a new station at Mallaig, which opened in January 1948.

== 1990s onwards ==
It was decided to reopen the station in 1990, after a local campaign highlighted the growing number of leisure boats and incidents in the area. The Waveney lifeboat 44-016 Ralph and Joy Swan (ON 1042) was initially placed on service, but was replaced the following year with the larger 54 ft (16 m) Arun lifeboat 54-07 City of Bradford IV (ON 1052).

In 1940, Tobermory lifeboat had been presented with a small version of the 'St John's Cross of Iona', by the Reverend George MacLeod, later Lord MacLeod of Fuinary, and it was carried on the lifeboat on all service launches. When the station closed, the cross remained aboard the lifeboat, which was transferred to operate from the new station at Mallaig, and was carried on board all subsequent Mallaig lifeboats. On 26 May 1991, with the Tobermory station re-established, the Mallaig Arun-class lifeboat, 52-21 The Davina and Charles Matthews Hunter (ON 1078), stopped in at Tobermory, and following a presentation ceremony, a small version of the 'St John's Cross of Iona' is now once again being carried aboard the Tobermory lifeboat.

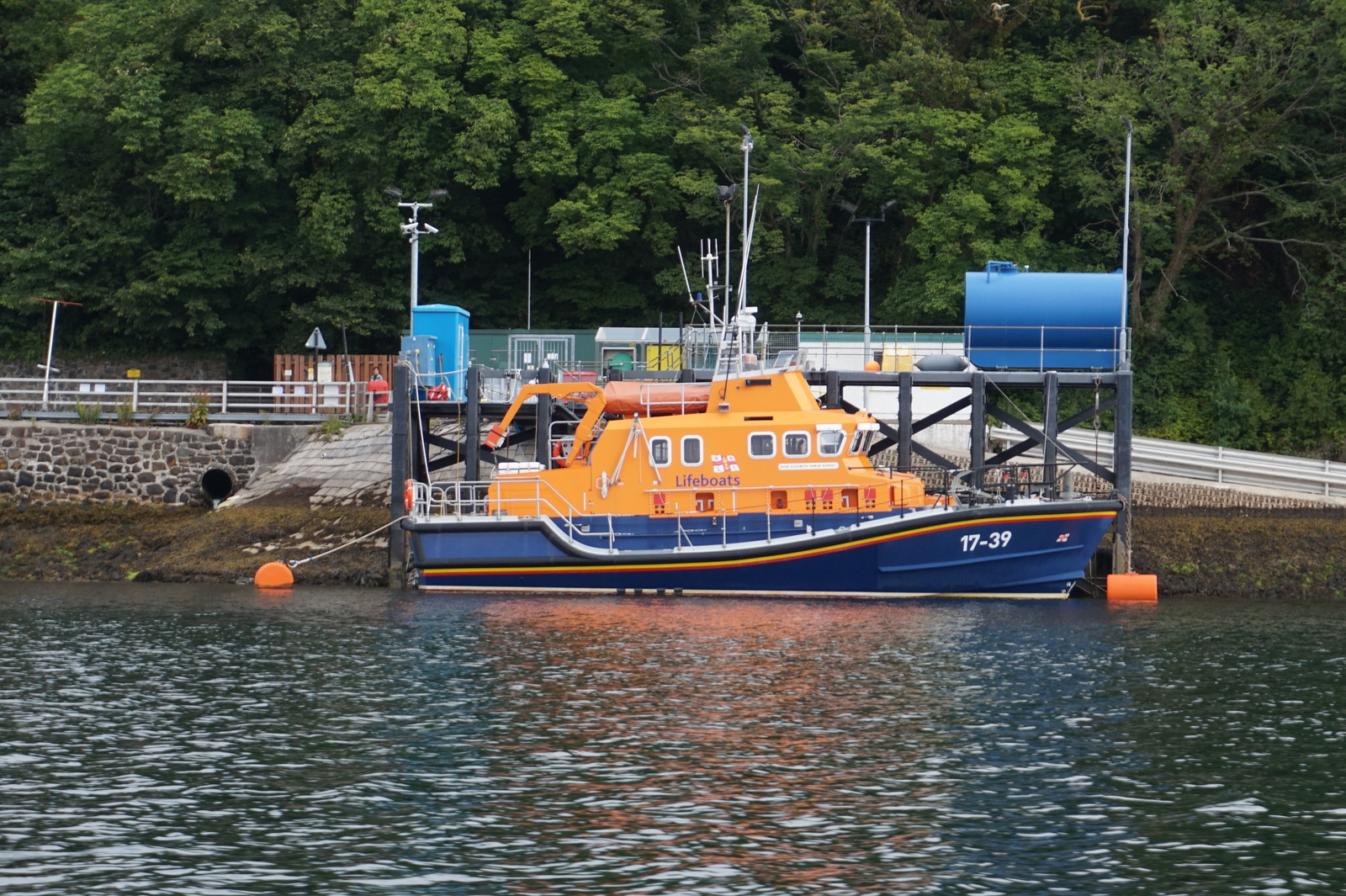
Tobermory Severn-class lifeboat 17-39 Elizabeth Fairlie Ramsey (ON 1270)

In 1992, a row of five lock-up garages was purchased alongside Mishnish Pier, and work was carried out to convert the buildings, to provide facilities for the RNLI crew and volunteers, and an office for H.M. Coastguard. The building was officially opened at a ceremony on 26 March 1994, funded from a local appeal which raised over £61,000. The appeal was started in the memory of Robert 'Bobby' MacLeod, a veteran of the 1947 lifeboat crew, and one of those people instrumental in the campaign to reopen the lifeboat station.

An alongside berth was completed in 2000. In 2003, Tobermory would receive their latest lifeboat, a 17 m (56 ft) Severn-class lifeboat, 17-39 Elizabeth Fairlie Ramsey (ON 1270).

On 27 January 2013, the Tobermory lifeboat was called to the aid of a fishing boat with gearbox failure, located 7 miles (11 km) west of the Isle of Coll. The boat was towed back to the Isle of Tiree, where another boat awaited to take up the tow, but the rope parted, and the fishing boat ended on the rocks. Lines and tows were set up several times by the lifeboat, and the fishing boat was finally retrieved to Tobermory. In all, the service had taken 11 hours.

== Dr Sam Jones ==
Dr Sam Jones (1967–2024) was a graduate of the London School of Economics, and received a doctorate from the University of Oxford. After a career in London and Belfast, a new role brought her to Scotland, and a move to Tobermory. Sam joined the Tobermory RNLI volunteer lifeboat crew in 2010, launching 35 times, and assisting 98 people at sea, including saving three lives. She was featured on the BBC TV program Saving Lives at Sea, talking about her part in the 2013 rescue of a fishing boat off the island of Tiree. After retiring from her crew role, Sam was made a Deputy Launching Authority, and in 2017, was appointed as Lifeboat Operations Manager. Since 2010, Sam had also acted as the Tobermory Lifeboat Press Officer, publishing more than 250 press releases.

In 2018, Sam enrolled in Maritime Historical Studies at the University of Exeter, and after five and a half years study, earned a PhD for completing a thesis on the 'History of the RNLI between 1849 and 1897', all whilst working in a full-time job. Sam was one of the '200 Voices' podcast series, commissioned for the 200th Anniversary of the RNLI, and was particularly delighted to be invited to the RNLI 200th Anniversary Service of Thanksgiving at Westminster Abbey in March 2024. Dr Sam Jones passed away peacefully on Saturday 5 October 2024 after a short illness, aged just 56.

- Dr Sam Jones RNLI 200 podcast

== Station honours ==
The following are awards made at Tobermory:

- Member, Order of the British Empire (MBE)
  Douglas 'Dougie' Richard MacNeilage, Honorary Treasurer – 2009NYH

== Tobermory lifeboats ==
ON (Note: ON is the RNLI's Official Number of the boat.)	Op.No. (Note: Op.No. is the RNLI's Operational Number of the boat carried on the hull.)	Name	Built	On station	Class	Comments
722	–	J. & W.	1929	1938	40-foot 6in Watson	Relief lifeboat, previously at Portpatrick
801	–	Sir Arthur Rose	1938	1938−1947	46-foot Watson	Transferred to Mallaig
Station Closed 1947–1990
1042	44-016	Ralph and Joy Swan	1976	1990−1991	Waveney	Previously at Ramsgate. Transferred to Portree.
1052	54-07	City of Bradford IV	1976	1991−1998	Arun	Previously at Humber, Thurso and Ballyglass.
1143	52-41	Ann Lewis Fraser	1988	1998−2003	Arun	Previously at Barra Island. Transferred to the relief fleet, later at Rosslare Harbour.
1270	17-39	Elizabeth Fairlie Ramsey	2003	2003−	Severn	

More post-service details can be found on the respective lifeboat class pages.

== See also ==
- List of RNLI stations
- List of former RNLI stations
- Royal National Lifeboat Institution lifeboats
