= Achill Island Lifeboat Station =

RNLI lifeboat station in County Mayo, Ireland

- Achill Island Lifeboat Station

- Location within Ireland

General information
- Type: RNLI Lifeboat Station
- Location: Cloghmore, Achill Sound, Achill Island, County Mayo, Ireland
- Coordinates: 53°52′58.0″N 9°56′40.7″W
- Opened: 28 August 1996
- Owner: Royal National Lifeboat Institution

Website
- Achill Island RNLI Lifeboat Station

Achill Island Lifeboat Station sits in the shadow of Carrickkildavnet Castle, overlooking Achill Sound, at the southern tip of Achill Island, the largest of the Irish isles, located of the east coast of Ireland in County Mayo.

A lifeboat station was established on Achill Island in August 1996 by the Royal National Lifeboat Institution (RNLI).

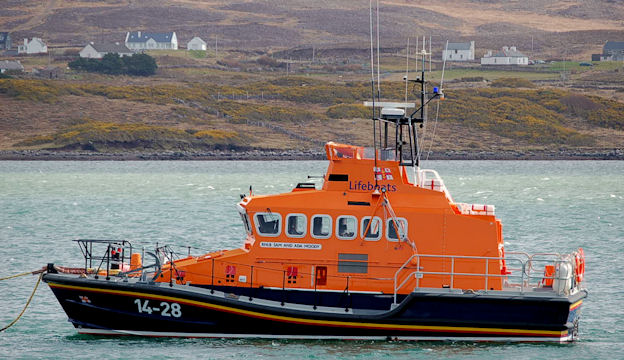
Achill Lifeboat 14-28 Sam and Ada Moody (ON1240)

The station currently operates 14-28 Sam and Ada Moody (ON 1240), a Trent-class All-weather lifeboat, on station since 1999.

== History ==
A meeting of the RNLI executive committee on 22 November 1995 resolved that a lifeboat was to be placed at Kildavnet on Achill Island in County Mayo, to cover the area of Clew Bay, for a one-year evaluation period. The nearest All-weather lifeboat stations were Ballyglass, 43 nautical miles (80 km) to the north, and Aran Islands, 60 nautical miles (110 km) to the south.

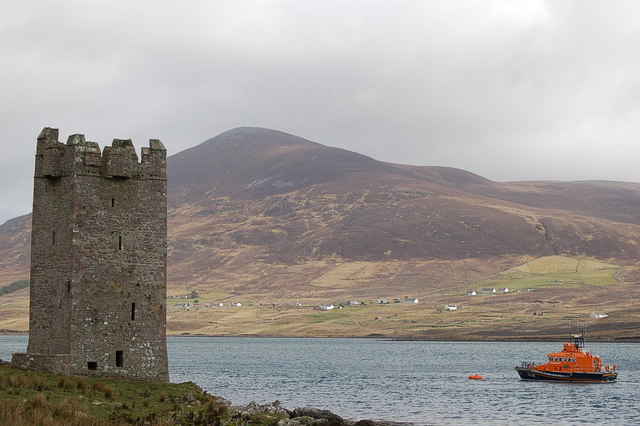
Achill Island Trent-class lifeboat in Achill Sound

Crew facilities were provide in July 1996, in the form of a portakabin and storage containers, and the 22-year-old Waveney-class All-weather lifeboat 44-009 Helen Turnbull (ON 1027), previously stationed at Sheerness, was temporarily placed on station, arriving at Achill Sound on 28 August.

After just 14 months, the Helen Turnbull (ON 1027) was withdrawn on 26 January 1998, and replaced by another temporary boat, the 52-foot Arun-class lifeboat 52-10 Soldian (ON 1057), previously stationed at Lerwick. Soldian would serve at Achill Island for just over one year, but in that time, would record the stations Silver Medal service.

Soldian was launched at 04:50, to begin the 14 miles (23 km) journey to Achill Head, to the aid of the fishing vessel Carrigeen Bay, drifting towards the rocks with engine failure. In violent gale-force conditions, with 8 m (26 ft) waves, the lifeboat arrived to find the vessel just 600 yards (550 m) from the rocks. With conditions too rough to effect a crew transfer, with great difficulty, a tow was set up. Even though the line parted several times, the vessel was towed to the shelter of Clare Island, arriving at 10:00. For this service, Coxswain Brian Patten was awarded the RNLI Silver Medal.

Soldian was withdrawn just two months later on 28 April 1999. She was replaced by Achill Islands first permanent lifeboat, a new Trent-class lifeboat. At a ceremony on 18 September 1999, the lifeboat, funded from the bequest of the late Mrs Ada Moody, was named 14-28 Sam and Ada Moody (ON 1240). The award of the RNLI Silver Medal to Coxswain Patten was announced at the end of the ceremony.

On 20 May 2002, the lifeboat was launched when four canoeists were blown out to sea in unseasonable gale force 7 conditions, which increased to force 9. In time critical circumstances, the lifeboat launched with just the coxswain and three crew, and a rescue helicopter was also dispatched. Two canoeists were rescued by helicopter, the other two people and three canoes were recovered by the lifeboat. The casualties were landed at Dugort, although conditions were too rough to tie up, so the coxswain held the bow to the pier to get all survivors ashore. The fourth canoe was retrieved on the return journey to Achill Sound. Letters of commendation were accorded to Coxswain Tommy Kilbane and the three crew.

Achill Island Lifeboat Station

After eight years in temporary accommodation, new crew facilities were provided, when a boathouse was constructed in 2004, at a cost of just over £600,000.

In 2005, crew members David Curtis and Arthur Knipe, and Dr Patrick Lineen, would be three of the first recipients of the new "Framed Certificate for First Aid", for their care of a seriously injured woman, who had fallen onto the derelict pier at Clare Island, on the night of 9 April.

Launching at 11:00 on 19 September 2013, the lifeboat went to the aid of a fishing boat with its nets entangled in the propellers, 54 miles (87 km) west of Achill Island. Arriving 3 hours later in "challenging" conditions, with force 7–8 winds and 4–6 m (13–20 ft) waves, a tow was established, arriving back to the island at 07:00 the following day. The lifeboat had been out for 17 hours.

Sam and Ada Moody was launched at 20:30 on 23 May 2022, to the aid of a lone yachtsman. His racing yacht had lost all power, and so was unable to communicate, couldn't drop his sail, and had no steering control. A fixed-wing aircraft located his position 40 nautical miles (74 km) west of Achill Island. The lifeboat arrived on scene at 23:00, and the Sligo-based Irish Coast Guard Helicopter Rescue 118 was dispatched to illuminate the vessel. A tow was set up, with the yacht brought to Clare Island, arriving at 08:55. The lifeboat returned to base by 10:00, almost 14 hours after setting out.

== Station honours ==
The following are awards made at Achill Island.

- RNLI Silver Medal
  Brian Patten, Coxswain/Asst. Mechanic – 2000
- James Michael Bower Endowment Fund Award 1999
  Brian Patten, Coxswain/Asst. Mechanic – 2000
- Silver Medal Service Certificate
  Stephen McNulty, Mechanic – 2000
  Thomas Kilbane, crew member – 2000
  John Johnston, crew member – 2000
  Raymond McKenna, crew member – 2000
  Liam Fallon, crew member – 2000
  Edward Corrigan, crew member – 2000
- 'A Framed Letter of Thanks signed by the Chairman of the Institution'
  The crew of the Achill Island lifeboat – 2000
- 'A Letter of commendation from the Operations Director'
  Thomas Kilbane, Coxswain – 2002
  Three crew members of the Achill Island lifeboat – 2002
- 'A Framed Certificate for First Aid, signed by Surgeon Rear Admiral F. Golden and the Chief Executive'
  David Curtis, crew member – 2005
  Arthur Knipe, crew member – 2005
  Dr Patrick Lineen – 2005

== Achill Island lifeboats ==
ON (Note: ON is the RNLI's Official Number of the boat.)	Op.No. (Note: Op.No. is the RNLI's Operational Number of the boat carried on the hull.)	Name	Built	On station	Class	Comments
1027	44-009	Helen Turnbull	1974	1996–1997	Waveney	Previously at Sheerness
1057	52-10	Soldian	1978	1998–1999	Arun	Previously at Lerwick.
1240	14-28	Sam and Ada Moody	1999	1999–	Trent	

More post-service details can be found on the respective lifeboat class pages.

== See also ==
- List of RNLI stations
- List of former RNLI stations
- Royal National Lifeboat Institution lifeboats

== Sources ==
- Leonard, Richie; Denton, Tony (2026). Lifeboat Enthusiasts Handbook 2026. Lifeboats Enthusiasts' Society.
