= Mallaig Lifeboat Station =

RNLI Lifeboat station in the Highlands, Scotland

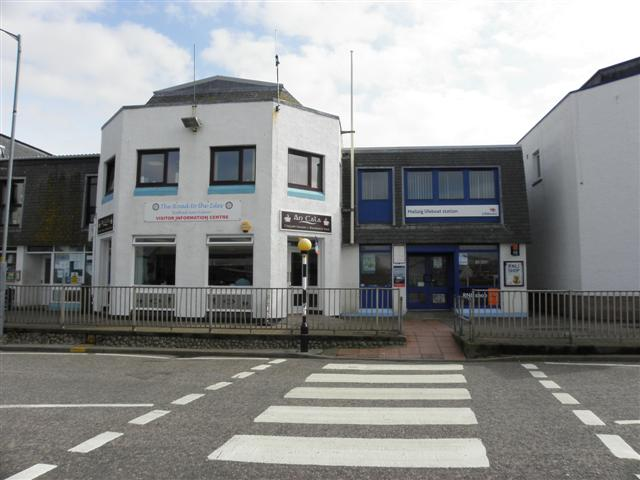
- Mallaig Lifeboat Station

- Location within Highland

General information
- Type: RNLI Lifeboat Station
- Location: Harbour Road, Mallaig, Invernessshire, PH41 4QD, Scotland
- Coordinates: 57°00′22.2″N 5°49′44.3″W
- Opened: 1948
- Owner: Royal National Lifeboat Institution

Website
- Mallaig RNLI Lifeboat Station

Mallaig Lifeboat Station is located at Harbour Road in Mallaig, a harbour town at the top of the north Morar peninsula, in the administrative region of Highland, historically Inverness-shire, on the north-west coast of Scotland.

A lifeboat was first placed at Mallaig by the Royal National Lifeboat Institution (RNLI) in 1948.

The station currently operates a Severn-class All-weather lifeboat, 17-26 Henry Alston Hewat (ON 1250), on station since 2001.

== History ==
Mallaig Lifeboat Station was established in January 1948, after difficulties maintaining a crew forced the closure of the Tobermory station in December 1947. The 46-foot Watson-class lifeboat Sir Arthur Rose (ON 801) was transferred from Tobermory to become the Mallaig lifeboat.

At 11:00 on 29 December 1951, the Sir Arthur Rose was launched, to provide a service to the Post Office. The regular boat had not been able to deliver the mail due to bad weather, so in rough seas and a strong north-westerly wind, provisions and the mail were delivered to the islands of Eigg, Rhum and Canna. The lifeboat returned home at 21:00.

In a north-westerly gale on the 17 January 1953, the 6,600-ton motor vessel Tapti of London, on passage to Newcastle upon Tyne, ran aground in the Gunna Sound between Coll and Tiree, with 62 people aboard. Barra Island lifeboat was launched at 23:00, and the Mallaig boat Sir Arthur Rose launched at 23:52. The Mallaig boat was first on scene, but decided to lay off until daybreak. In the half-light of morning, Mallaig boat went alongside one of the ships boats, which had been lowered, and one by one, all 62 crew dropped down the rope to the waiting lifeboat. Both lifeboats made for Tobermory, arriving at 23:30.

In 1955, the RNLI would receive one of the largest bequests received to date. Mrs E. M. M. Gordon Cubbin, late of the Isle of Man, left sufficient funds to provide four lifeboats, each costing in excess of £30,000. Two 46-foot Watson-class lifeboats were to be stationed at Douglas and Port St Mary, and two larger 52-foot Barnett-class (Mk.II) lifeboats were for Barra Island and Mallaig. Mallaig received the lifeboat E. M. M. Gordon Cubbin (ON 936) in 1957.

E. M. M. Gordon Cubbin (ON 936) was launched in gale-force conditions on 14 September 1963, to reports of a group of people trapped on a cliff in Loch Duich. Picking up local man Mr McDonald at the head of the Loch, who knew the location of the group, five men and 2 children were rescued. Second Coxswain Charles Henderson was awarded 'The Thanks of the Institution inscribed on Vellum', with the rest of the crew receiving 'Vellum Service Certificates.

On 27 October 1988, the Mallaig Arun-class lifeboat 52-21 The Davina and Charles Matthews Hunter (ON 1078) was launched to the aid of the motor fishing vessel Galilean. Showing great skill with the handling of the Arun-class lifeboat in Force 11 conditions, Coxswain Thomas Ralston managed to tow the vessel to a safe mooring in Loch Nevis. Ralston was later awarded the RNLI Bronze Medal, the first medal to be awarded at Mallaig.

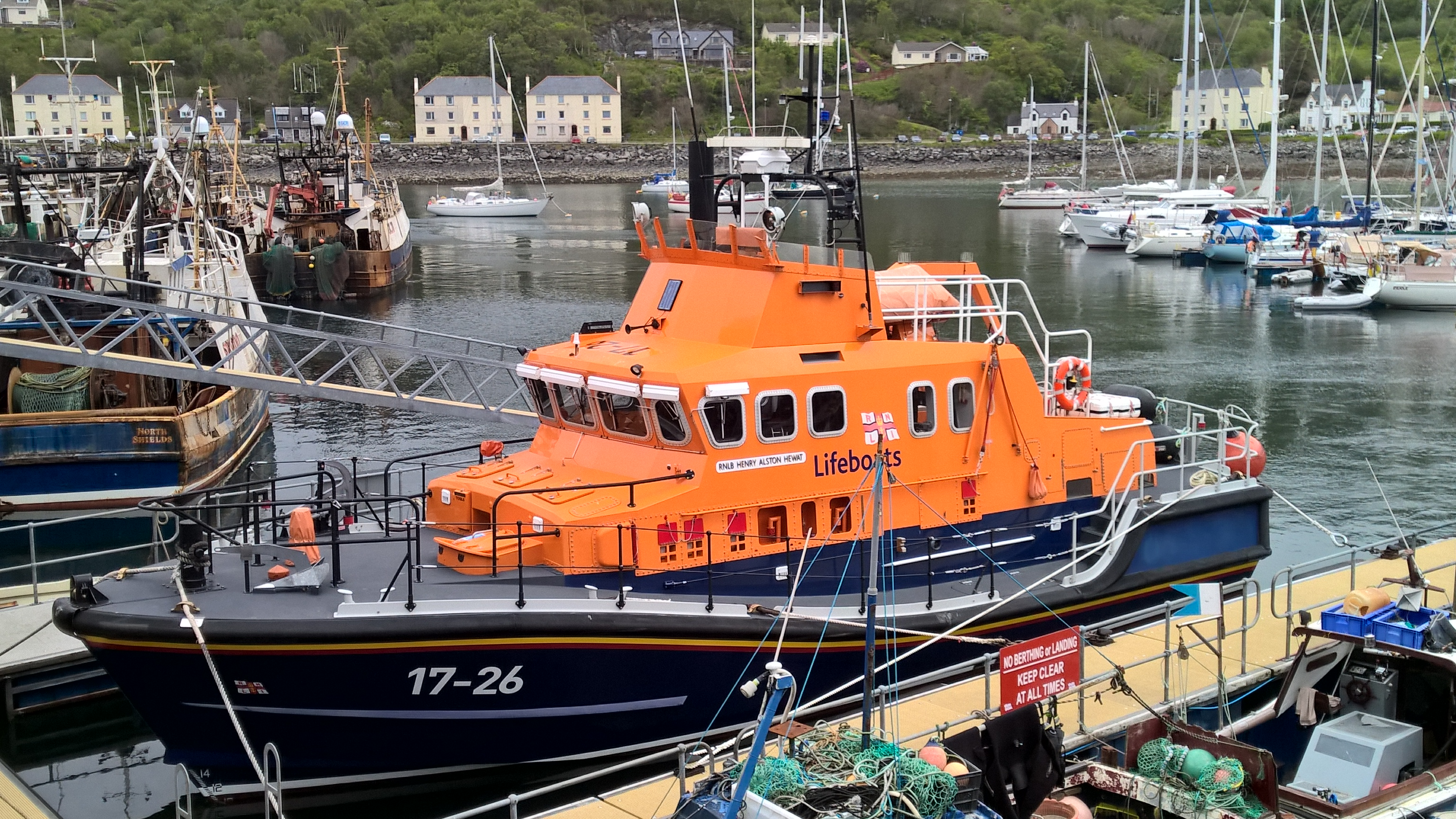
Severn-class lifeboat 17-26 Henry Alston Hewat (ON 1250)

Plans were drawn up to modernise Mallaig lifeboat station in 1998. A conversion of shop premises next to the harbour provided new crew facilities, and was completed in September 1998. A pontoon berth was constructed later.

In 2001, Mallaig would receive the new Severn-class lifeboat 17-26 Henry Alston Hewat (ON 1250). Of the £1.8 million cost of the boat, £1 million was from the bequest of the late Catherine Hewat, and at a ceremony on the 16 June 2001, the boat was named after her father, Henry Alston Hewat.

== Station honours ==
The following are awards made at Mallaig:

- RNLI Bronze Medal
  Thomas Ralston, Coxswain/Mechanic – 1989
- The Thanks of the Institution inscribed on Vellum
  Ian Bruce Watt, Coxswain – 1951
  Ian Bruce Watt, Coxswain – 1959
  Charles Henderson, Second Coxswain – 1963
  Ian Angus MacNaughton, Acting Mechanic – 1986
- Vellum Service Certificates
  David McMinn, crew member – 1963
  George Edward Lawrie, crew member – 1963
  D. Henderson, crew member – 1963
  R. Rimmer, crew member – 1963
  R. Mackenzie, crew member – 1963
  I. Campbell, crew member – 1963
  G. Christie, crew member – 1963
  Mr. McDonald, local man – 1963.
- 'A Framed Letter of Thanks signed by the Chairman of the Institution'
  Michael Ian Currie, Coxswain – 2010

== Roll of honour ==
In memory of those lost whilst serving at Mallaig:

- Suffered a heart attack just after launching on service on 5 September 2001, and died four days later.
  Patrick Morrison

== Mallaig lifeboats ==
| ON (Note: ON is the RNLI's Official Number of the boat.) | Op.No. (Note: Op.No. is the RNLI's Operational Number of the boat carried on the hull.) | Name | Built | On station | Class | Comments |
|---|---|---|---|---|---|---|
| 801 | – | Sir Arthur Rose | 1938 | 1948−1957 | 46-foot Watson | Previously at Tobermory. Transferred to Courtmacsherry Harbour. |
| 936 | – | E. M. M. Gordon Cubbin | 1957 | 1957−1982 | 52-foot Barnett (Mk.II) | Transferred to the Relief fleet. |
| 1078 | 52-21 | The Davina and Charles Matthews Hunter | 1982 | 1982−2001 | Arun | Transferred to the Relief fleet. |
| 1250 | 17-26 | Henry Alston Hewat | 2000 | 2001− | Severn | |

More post-service details can be found on the respective lifeboat class pages.

== See also ==
- List of RNLI stations
- List of former RNLI stations
- Royal National Lifeboat Institution lifeboats
