= William Osborne (shipbuilder) =

William Osborne Ltd
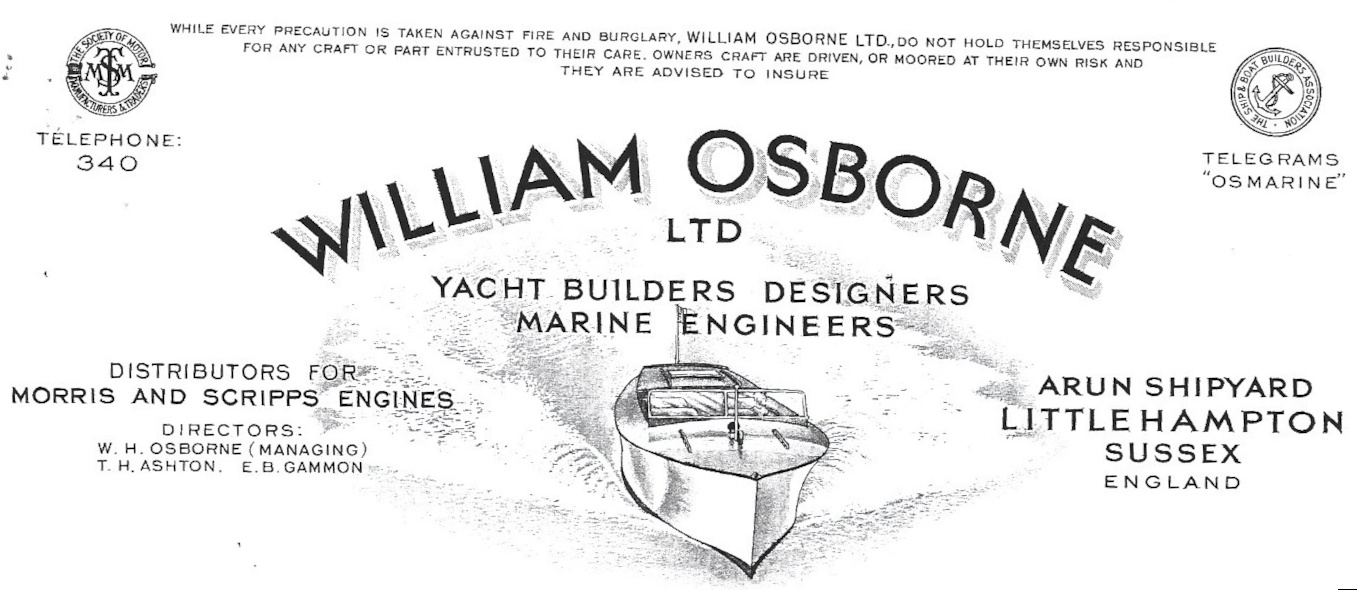
- Company type: Private
- Industry: Shipbuilding
- Founded: 1919
- Founder: William Osborne
- Defunct: 1980s
- Headquarters: Littlehampton, West Sussex, England
- Products: Motor yachts, lifeboats, naval craft

William Osborne (1880–1931) was a British boat builder and the founder of William Osborne Ltd, a shipyard based in Littlehampton, West Sussex. Established in 1919, the Osborne yard became known for its high-quality motor yachts, speedboats, and later for building lifeboats for the Royal National Lifeboat Institution (RNLI). Osborne-built vessels played significant roles during the Second World War – including participation in the Dunkirk evacuation – and the company’s post-war output included pioneering RNLI lifeboats such as the Arun-class.

== History ==
=== Early years ===
William Osborne senior initially worked in the motor industry, building bespoke car bodies in London from 1912. After the First World War, he established the Arun Shipyard in 1919. Early yachts such as Ma Joie (40 ft) and Ma Joie II (60 ft) launched Osborne’s reputation for craftsmanship, particularly the "Osborne Finish" of hand-varnished mahogany woodwork.

=== Second World War ===
The yard contributed significantly to the war effort. It built Air-Sea Rescue craft, Fairmile D motor gunboats, and converted yachts for Royal Navy Patrol Service use. Vessels such as Gerfalcon, Naiad Errant, Aquabelle, and Helinda were requisitioned for Operation Dynamo.

=== Post-war and RNLI boats ===
After the war, the yard became a major RNLI contractor. It built the majority of the Oakley-class lifeboats and the first two Arun-class boats: RNLB Arun (ON 1018) and RNLB Sir William Arnold (ON 1022).

=== Bird-Class motor cruisers ===
From the 1930s to 1960s, Osborne built production cruisers named after birds:

- Swallow & Swallow Senior – fast semi-displacement launches
- Falcon – 32–36 ft raised deckhouse cruisers
- Swift & Swift Junior – compact hard-chine coastal cruisers
- Kestrel – 28–30 ft cruisers, timber or GRP
- Martlet, Osprey, Eagle & Sea Eagle – mid- to large-size displacement and semi-planing yachts

These vessels were known for their fine joinery and seaworthiness.

=== Fire and closure ===
A major fire in the early 1980s destroyed many drawings and moulds. Though some operations resumed, the company ceased trading later that decade.

== Notable vessels ==
- Gerfalcon (1937) – National Historic Ships register, ADLS-listed
- Aquabelle (1939) – Dunkirk Little Ship
- Naiad Errant (1939) – Swallow Senior prototype, ADLS-listed
- Helinda (1939) – patrol service yacht
- HMS Medusa – refit at Osborne yard, 1945
- RNLB Arun (ON 1018) – first Arun-class lifeboat
- RNLB Sir William Arnold (ON 1022) – famous Guernsey lifeboat
