= Saint Peter Port Lifeboat Station =

RNLI lifeboat station on Guernsey

St Peter Port Lifeboat Station

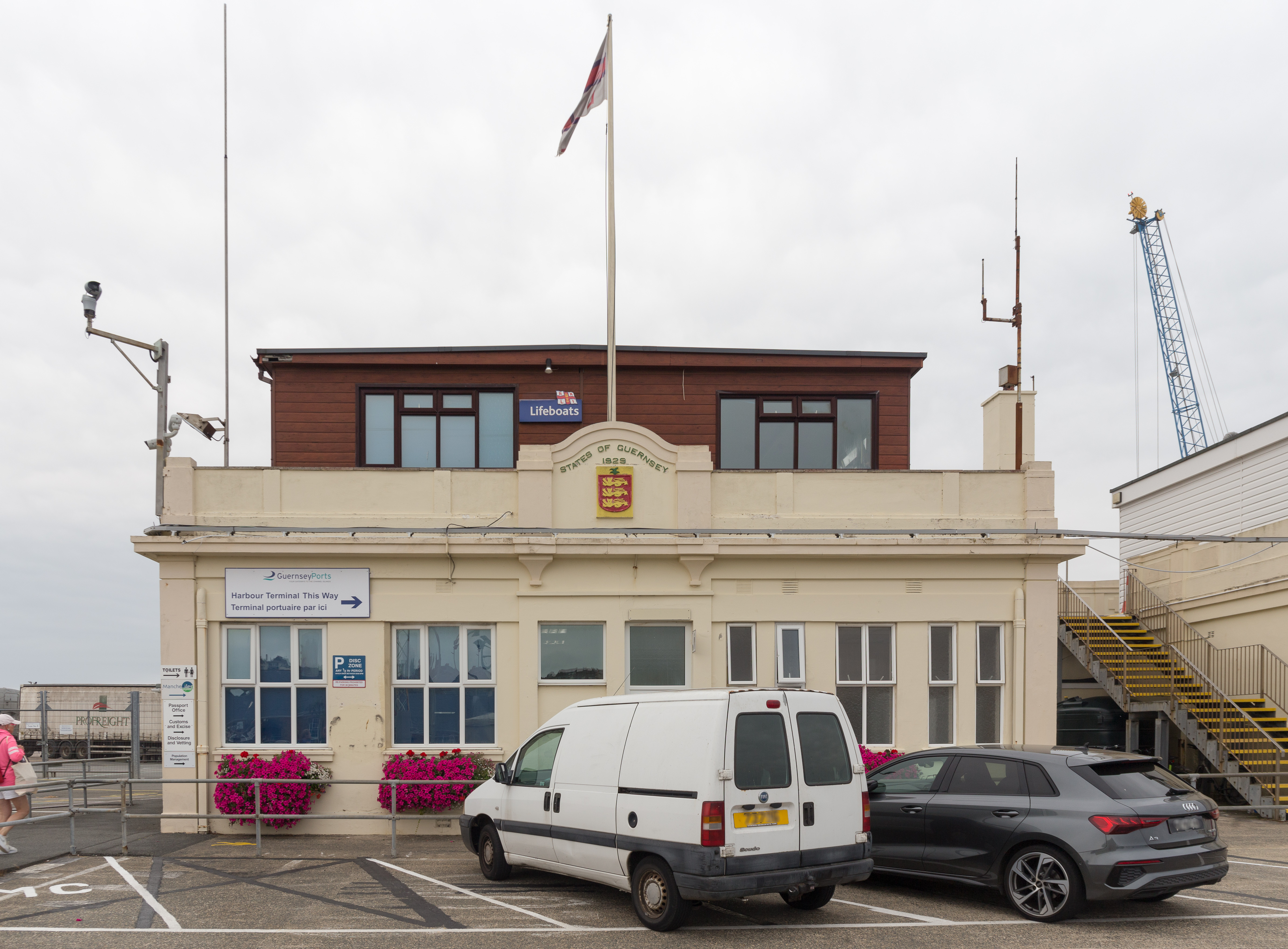
- St Peter Port lifeboat station

- Location within Channel Islands
- Former names: St Samson Lifeboat Station

General information
- Type: RNLI Lifeboat Station
- Location: St Julian's Emplacement, St Peter Port, GY1 2LW, Guernsey
- Coordinates: 49.458028°N 2.529917°W
- Opened: 1803
- Owner: Royal National Lifeboat Institution

Website
- St Peter Port Lifeboat Station

St Peter Port Lifeboat Station is located at St Peter Port, capital of the Bailiwick of Guernsey, and main port of the island of Guernsey, a self-governing British Crown Dependency and one of the Channel Islands.

A lifeboat was first placed on Guernsey in 1803, stationed at St Sampson. In 1861, management of the station was transferred to the Royal National Lifeboat Institution (RNLI), with operations moving to St Peter Port in 1881.

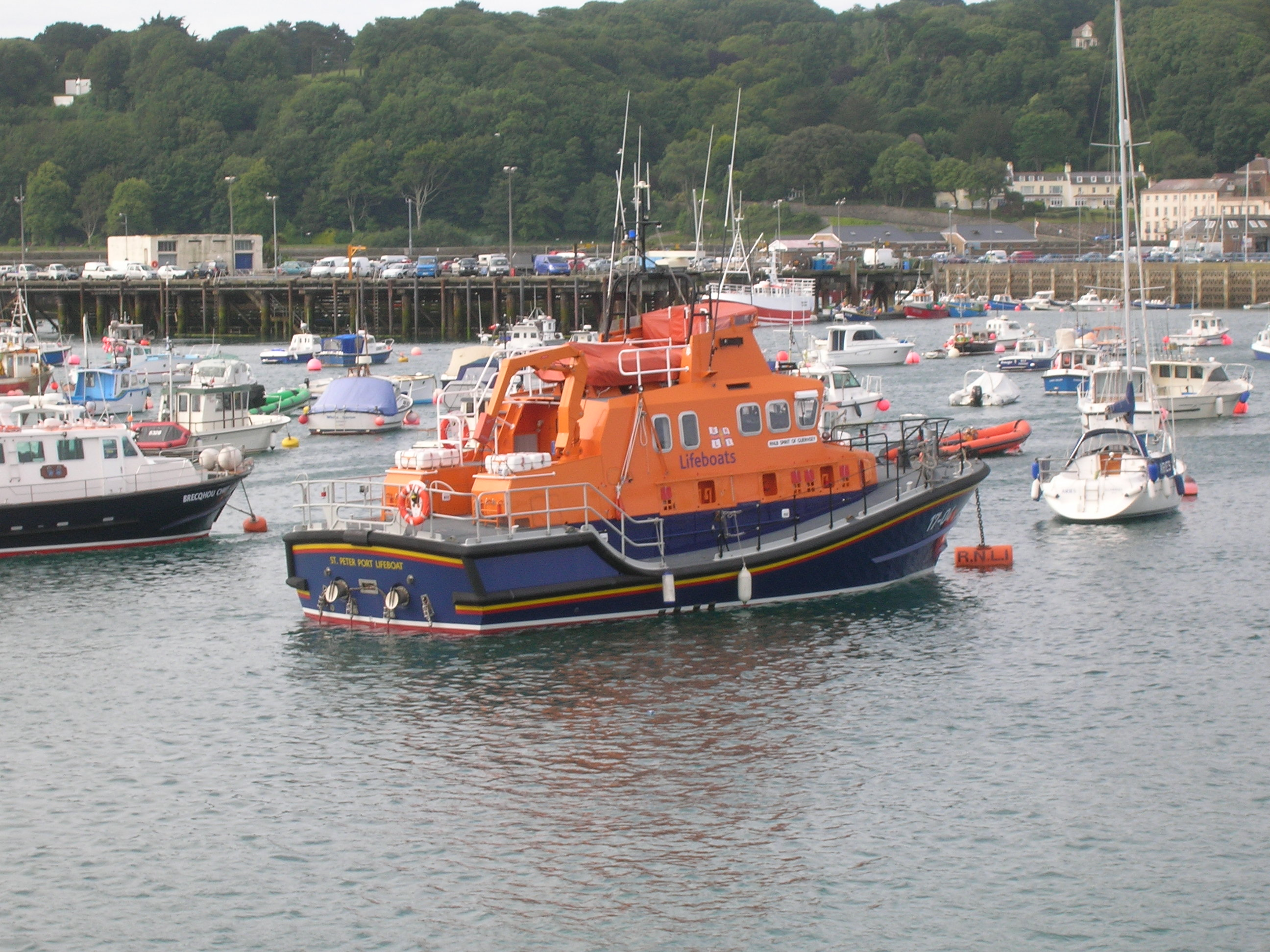
Severn-class All-weather lifeboat 17-04 Spirit of Guernsey (ON 1203)

The station currently operates a Severn-class All-weather lifeboat, 17-04 Spirit of Guernsey (ON 1203), on station since 1997, and a B-class (Atlantic 85) Inshore lifeboat, Harold Hobbs (B-943), on station since 2024.

== History ==
In 1803, the 12 members of the St Peter Port Douzaine decided that a lifeboat was required. An order for a lifeboat costing £170 was placed with Henry Greathead. The lifeboat would be stationed at St Sampson. It is not known for how long the lifeboat operated, but was reported to have 'rotted away'.

Ever since its founding in 1824, the Royal National Institution for the Preservation of Life from Shipwreck (RNIPLS), later to become the RNLI in 1854, would award medals for deeds of gallantry at sea, even if no lifeboats were involved. In 1851, the RNIPLS Silver Medal was awarded to Pilot John Mitchell for the rescue of three people from the Cutter Adele. Five more RNLI Silver Medals were awarded for the efforts to save the 15 crew of the barque Boadicea, on passage from Alexandria to Antwerp, when she was wrecked on Tautenay rock on 5 January 1857. Just six of the 15 crew were rescued.

As a result of the wreck of the Boadicea, Mr Gustavus Carrington and Capt. Richard Peake arranged a public subscription for the purchase of a new lifeboat. £115-19s-10d was raised in just seven days. Rescue, a new 28-foot self-righting 'Pulling and Sailing' (P&S) lifeboat, one with sails and oars, arrived on 20 July. Without a carriage, the boat was stored at Stonelake's yard in St Sampson.

On 30 May 1861, a resolution was passed at the public meeting, to request that the RNLI take over the management of St Sampson Lifeboat Station. The request was forwarded by Mr Henri Tupper, on behalf of the Guernsey lifeboat committee, and following the visit and report of the RNLI Inspector, the request was agreed at a meeting of the RNLI committee of management on 4 July 1861. A new lifeboat carriage was ordered, along with the commissioning of a new lifeboat house, to be built on North Side Street, St Sampson, at a cost of £134.

In 1862, the RNLI supplied a replacement 30-foot (6-oared) lifeboat and carriage. Initially unnamed, the RNLI would receive the bequest of £1000 from the late Miss Louisa Hall in 1868. The funds were appropriated to the station, and the lifeboat named Louisa Hall.

Victor Hugo presented the Harbour Master Capt. Abraham Martin, as a ‘mark of esteem’ with his own design of lifejacket and belt in 1870.

In 1875, a larger 32-feet 10-oared lifeboat, along with its carriage, was sent to Guernsey. In a grand celebration, the lifeboat was drawn by 8 horses through the principle towns of the island, escorted by a band and a large crowd of spectators. At a service and naming ceremony, the lifeboat, funded by a gift to the Institution by Mrs. and the Misses Lockett of Liverpool, in memory of a deceased son and brother, was named John Lockett.

In 1878, the lifeboat house was sold to the States for £143-10s-0d, and the John Lockett was transferred to the new La Lande Lifeboat Station, established in the north-east corner of the Island, near what is now Beaucette Marina. A new boathouse had been constructed, at a cost of £334. However, after problems maintaining a crew in that location, it was decided to relocate the lifeboat once again, this time to a new station at St Peter Port. The lifeboat was returned to St Sampson in 1880 for storage, until the new station was ready.

In 1881, St Peter Port Lifeboat Station was established at Saint Peter Port Harbour castle emplacement, with the Castle slipway being amended to suit lifeboat launches. 1896 saw the introduction of maroons to summon the crew.

In June 1940 the relief lifeboat Alfred and Clara Heath ON 672 was strafed by German aircraft and Harold Hobbs, son of the Coxswain Fred Hobbs, was killed. This lifeboat stayed in Guernsey during the occupation and was used by the Kriegsmarine (Nazi German navy).

Lifeboat house built on St Julians Emplacement in 1946.

In 1952 the Flying Christine, an ex seaplane tender was brought into service by St John Ambulance as an ambulance boat, to work closely with the RNLI.

RNLI Gold Medal and Norwegian Lifeboat Service Gold Medal awarded to Hubert Petit for rescue crew of 9 from Johann Collett in 1963. In 1977 maroons were replaced by ‘bleepers’, which were followed in 1983 with pagers.

In 1978 Coxswain John Petit was awarded a silver medal and the ‘Maud Smith’ award for the bravest act of lifesaving that year following the rescue from the oil rig Orion.

RNLI Gold Medal awarded to Coxwain Michael Scales for the rescue of 29 from Bonita in December 1981 as well as the ‘Maud Smith’ Award for the bravest act of lifesaving that year.

In 1992 Coxswain Peter Bisson received a silver medal for the rescue from the yacht Sena Siorra and the ‘Maud Smith’ Award for the bravest act of lifesaving that year.

From 2015, the Guernsey Joint Emergency Services Control Centre handles all 999 emergency calls including radio Mayday, Pan-pan and Sécurité messages.

2020 saw the RNLI's 1,500th call out from Guernsey, during which time 600 lives have been saved and 2,000 people taken to safety.

In 2024, St Peter Port received a new B-class (Atlantic 85) lifeboat, Harold Hobbs (B-943), in memory of the RNLI volunteer who was killed by German forces while serving on a Guernsey lifeboat in 1940.

On 2 October 2025, the RNLI announced that following a strategic review of resources, the three lifeboat stations in the Channel Islands, St Helier in Jersey, Alderney, and St Peter Port, would each be assigned a Shannon-class All-weather lifeboat over the following three years, replacing the Tamar-class, Trent-class and Severn-class lifeboats on station.

== Operations ==
Search and rescue operations are conducted and co-ordinated using the Joint Emergency Services Control Centre (JESCC) with some or all of:

- Lifeboat stations in Alderney, Jersey and France
- Jersey Coastguard
- Channel Islands Air Search spotter plane
- Guernsey Fire and Rescue Service
- Guernsey Ambulance and Rescue Service
- UK Maritime and Her Majesty's Coastguard
- French Maritime Authorities and Maritime Gendarmerie
- Royal Navy
- French Navy

== Records and awards ==
- RNLI Medals awarded:

2 Gold medals
14 Silver medals
15 Bronze medals

- Over 1,500 launches
- Over 600 lives saved
- Foreign gallantry awards received from:

France
Norway
Greece
Liberia
Marshall Islands

== Station honours ==
The following are awards made at St Peter Port, Guernsey

- RNLI Gold Medal

Hubert Ernest Petit, Coxswain – 1963

Michael John Scales, Coxswain – 1982

- Gold Medal, awarded by the Norwegian Lifeboat Institution

Hubert Ernest Petit, Coxswain – 1963

- Gold medal, awarded by the Greek Ministry of Merchant Marine
  presented by His Excellency the Greek Ambassador, Monsieur N Kyriazides

John Hubert Petit, Coxswain – 1984
(awarded for service in 1979)

- RNIPLS Silver Medal

John Mitchell, Pilot – 1851

- RNLI Silver Medal

Henry Bougourd, Pilot of Cutter Blonde – 1857
Peter Corbet, Pilot of Cutter Blonde – 1857
George Hughes, Pilot of Cutter Blonde – 1857
William Pillar, Gunner, H.M. Revenue Cutter Eagle – 1857
William Cockrom, Steward, H.M. Revenue Cutter Eagle – 1857
(each man also awarded £2)

John Hubert Petit, Coxswain – 1978

Peter Bisson, Coxswain – 1992

- Silver Cup with diploma, awarded by the Norwegian Lifeboat Institution

Eric Clifford Pattimore, Motor Mechanic – 1963
John Hubert Petit, crew member – 1963

- Silver medal, awarded by the Greek Ministry of Merchant Marine
  presented by His Excellency the Greek Ambassador, Monsieur N Kyriazides

Robert Hamon, crew member – 1984
Eric Pattimore, crew member – 1984
Robert Vowles, crew member – 1984
John Robilliard, crew member – 1984
Graham Eker, crew member – 1984
(awarded for service in 1979)

- RNLI Bronze Medal

Eric Clifford Pattimore, Motor Mechanic – 1963
John Hubert Petit, crew member – 1963

John Hubert Petit, Coxswain – 1975 (Second-Service Clasp)

John Harry Robilliard, Emergency Mechanic – 1975

John Hubert Petit, Coxswain – 1978 (Third-Service Clasp)

John Hubert Petit, Coxswain – 1979 (Fourth-Service Clasp)

Peter Nicholas Bougourd, Second Coxswain – 1982
Robert Lewis Vowles, Mechanic – 1982
Alan Frederick Martel, Assistant Mechanic – 1982
Peter John Bisson, crew member – 1982
John Philip Bougourd, crew member – 1982
Richard James Hamon, crew member – 1982
John Webster, crew member – 1982

Michael John Scales, Coxswain – 1984

Peter John Bisson, Second Coxswain – 1985 (Second-Service Clasp)

- The Maud Smith Award
  (for the bravest act of lifesaving during the year by a member of a lifeboat crew)

John Hubert Petit, Coxswain – 1978

Michael John Scales, Coxswain – 1981

Peter John Bisson, Coxswain – 1992

- Medal Service Certificate

Robert Hamon, crew member – 1979
Eric Pattimore, crew member – 1979
Robert Vowles, crew member – 1979
John Robilliard, crew member – 1979
Graham Eker, crew member – 1979

- The Thanks of the Institution inscribed on Vellum

St Peter Port lifeboat crew – 1963

John H. Petit, Coxswain – 1971

Peter Bougourd, Deputy Coxswain – 1978
Robert Hamon, crew member – 1978

Lloyd De Mouilpied, Deputy Coxswain – 1978
Eric C Pattimore, Motor Mechanic – 1978
Robert Vowles, Assistant Mechanic – 1978
Michael Scales, crew member – 1978
Robert Hamon, crew member – 1978
John Webster, crew member – 1978
John Robilliard, crew member – 1978

Michael John Scales, Coxswain – 1983

Peter Nicholas Bougourd, Second Coxswain – 1983
Alan Martel, Assistant Mechanic – 1983

Robert Vowles, Motor Mechanic – 1984

Alan Martel, Assistant Mechanic – 1985
Michael Guille, crew member – 1985

John Bougourd, Second Coxswain – 1992
James Youlton, Mechanic – 1992
Keith Martel, Assistant Mechanic – 1992
Philip Martel, crew member – 1992
Gary Cook, crew member – 1992
Andrew Le Provost, crew member – 1992
Vincent Helmot, crew member – 1992

James Youlton, Mechanic – 1995
Robert Harmon, crew member – 1995

- A Framed Letter of Thanks signed by the Chairman of the Institution

St Peter Port lifeboat crew – 1971

The Master of the tug Abeille Languedoc – 1982

Peter Bisson, Coxswain – 1995

Anthony White, Coxswain – 2009

- A Collective Letter of Thanks signed by the Chief Executive of the Institution

St Peter Port lifeboat crew – 2009

- Wristwatches, awarded by the owners of the ship Johann Collett

St Peter Port lifeboat crew – 1963

- Letter of Thanks, from French Government

St Peter Port lifeboat crew – 1931

- 1981 Silver Plate
  presented by the Norwegian Company responsible for the crew of the Bonita

Coxswain Michael John Scales, Coxswain – 1981

- Special Certificate of Commendation,
  presented by the Commissioner of Maritime Affairs, Republic of Liberia

St Peter Port lifeboat crew – 1985

- Letter of Thanks, from the Government of the Marshall Islands

St Peter Port lifeboat crew – 2006

- Member, Order of the British Empire (MBE)

John Hubert Petit, Former Coxswain, Harbourmaster – 1988NYH

Peter Bisson, Coxswain – 1996QBH

Robert Ramsay Hamon – 2005QBH

Anthony Charles White, Coxswain – 2011QBH

Celia Lois Allen, Chairman, Ladies Lifeboat Guild – 2016QBH

- British Empire Medal

John Philip Bougourd, Former Coxswain – 2012QBH

- The Queen's Award for Voluntary Service

St Peter Port RNLI Lifeboat Station – 2021

== St Samson lifeboats ==
49°29′01.7″N 2°30′58.7″W

ON (Note: ON is the RNLI's Official Number of the boat.)	Name	Built	On station	Class	Comments
–	Unknown	1803	1803–????	Greathead-class	(Note: 10-oared Greathead-class lifeboat, funded by the Royal States of Guernsey, built by Henry Greathead of South Shields, costing £170.); Reported to have 'rotted away'
Pre-317	The Rescue	1857	1857–1862	28-foot Peake Self-righting (P&S)	(Note: 28-foot x 6-foot 1in (6-oared) self-righting (P&S) lifeboat, built by Forrest of Limehouse, London, costing £136.)
Pre-393	Unnamed	1862	1862–1868	30-foot Peake (P&S)	(Note: 30-foot x 7-foot (6-oared) Peake self-righting (P&S) lifeboat, built by Forrestt of Limehouse, London, costing £182.); Renamed Louisa Hall in 1868.
Pre-393	Louisa Hall	1862	1868–1875	30-foot Peake (P&S)	(Note: Legacy of Miss L. Hall of Maida Vale.); Capsized 12 June 1875.
Pre-597	John Lockett	1875	1875–1878	32-foot Self-righting (P&S)	(Note: 32-foot x 7-foot 8in (10-oared) Prowse-class self-righting (P&S) lifeboat, gift of Mrs and the Misses Lockett, built by Forrestt of Limehouse, London, costing £296.); Transferred to La Lande in 1878.
Station Closed 1878–1880
Pre-597	John Lockett	1875	1880–1881	32-foot Prowse Self-righting (P&S)	Transferred to St Peter Port in 1881.

Station closed, 1881
Pre ON numbers are unofficial numbers used by the Lifeboat Enthusiast Society to reference early lifeboats not included on the official RNLI list.

== La Lande lifeboat ==
49°30′16.8″N 2°30′20.4″W

ON	Name	Built	On station	Class	Comments
Pre-597	John Lockett	1875	1878–1880	32-foot Prowse Self-righting (P&S)	Lifeboat returned to St Sampson in 1880

Station Closed, 1880

== St Peter Port lifeboats ==
=== Pulling and Sailing (P&S) lifeboats ===
ON	Name	Built	On station	Class	Comments
Pre-597	John Lockett	1875	1881–1888	32-foot Prowse Self-righting (P&S)	
165	Vincent Wilkinson, Kirk Ella	1888	1888–1929	34-foot Self-Righting (P&S)	(Note: 34-foot x 8-foot (10-oared) self-righting (P&S) lifeboat, gift of Col. E. A. D. Brooshoft of Kirk Ella, Yorkshire, built by Woolfe of Shadwell, London, costing £377.)
626	Arthur Lionel	1912	1912–1929	35-foot Liverpool (P&S)	(Note: 35-foot x 10-foot (12-oared) Liverpool-class non-self-righting (P&S) lifeboat, legacy of Sir Thomas Tobin of Ballincollig, built by Thames Ironworks of Blackwall, London, costing £1,170.)

=== All-weather lifeboats ===
ON	Op. No. (Note: Op. No. is the RNLI's Operational Number of the boat carried on the hull.)	Name	Built	On station	Class	Comments
719	–	Queen Victoria	1929	1929–1940	51-foot Barnett	Sent for maintenance, assigned to Killybegs when unable to return to Guernsey due to occupation.
672	–	Alfred and Clara Heath	1922	1940–1945	40-foot Self-Righting (Motor)	(Note: 40-foot x 10-foot 6in self-righting (motor) lifeboat, legacy of Mr A. Heath, built by J. Samuel White of Cowes, costing £8,302.); Reserve lifeboat, previously at Torbay and Salcombe. Captured and used by enemy forces between 1940 and 1945.
719	–	Queen Victoria	1929	1945–1954	51-foot Barnett	
912	–	Euphrosyne Kendal	1954	1954–1972	52-foot Barnett (Mk.I)	
1025	52-02	Sir William Arnold	1973	1973–1997	Arun	
1203	17-04	Spirit of Guernsey	1996	1997–	Severn	

=== Inshore lifeboats ===
Op. No.	Name	On station	Class	Comments
B-889	Elizabeth and Margaret Milligan	2019–2024	B-class (Atlantic 85)	
B-943	Harold Hobbs	2024–	B-class (Atlantic 85)	

== Alderney ==
Alderney lifeboat station was established in 1869, operating for a short period until 1884, when it was closed. The station was re-established in 1984. Between 1885 and 1984, St Peter Port Lifeboat Station provided cover.

== Charity status ==
The Saint Peter Port Lifeboat Station is a Guernsey registered charity. CH135.

== Media ==
Pictures of four Guernsey lifeboats appeared on a set of postage stamps issued by Guernsey Post to commemorate the 150th anniversary of the RNLI in 1974 and a further six lifeboats appeared on a further set of stamps to commemorate the 175th anniversary of the RNLI in 1999.

The lifeboat has also appeared on phonecards issued by Cable & Wireless.

== See also ==
- List of RNLI stations
- List of former RNLI stations
- Royal National Lifeboat Institution lifeboats
