= St Helier Lifeboat Station =

RNLI lifeboat station on Jersey, Channel Islands

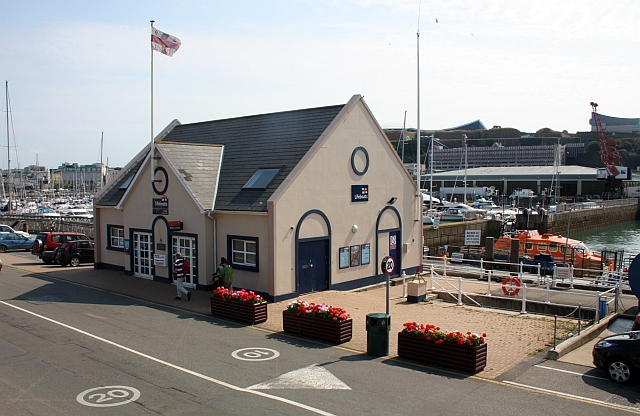
- St Helier Lifeboat Station

- Location within Channel Islands

General information
- Type: RNLI Lifeboat Station
- Location: Albert Quay, St Helier, Jersey, Channel Islands, JE2 3NE
- Coordinates: 49°10′50.4″N 2°06′46.9″W
- Opened: States of Jersey 1830–1884; RNLI 1884–Present
- Owner: Royal National Lifeboat Institution

Website
- St Helier RNLI Lifeboat Station

St Helier Lifeboat Station is located at St Helier, capital of the Bailiwick of Jersey, and main port of the island of Jersey, a self-governing British Crown Dependency and largest of the Channel Islands.

A lifeboat was first stationed at St Helier by the States of Jersey in 1830. Management of the station was taken over by the Royal National Lifeboat Institution (RNLI) in 1884.

The station currently operates an Tamar-class All-weather lifeboat, 16-12 George Sullivan (ON 1292), and a B-class (Atlantic 85) Inshore lifeboat, The Spirit of St Helier (B-934).

== History ==
In January 1825, just after the founding of the Royal National Institution for the Preservation of Life from Shipwreck (RNIPLS), the cutter Fanny, on passage to Jersey from St Malo, ran aground and was wrecked near Elizabeth Castle. Rescuers managed to save 13 of the 18 passengers and crew, and three Gold Medals, and a Silver Medal were awarded to their rescuers.

Three years later, a second boat named Fanny, of St Malo, with the same Master, Captain Destouches, ran aground on rocks 1 mile (1.6 km) from St Helier, and 13 lost their lives. This would finally prompt John Le Couteur to raise the matter of a Lifeboat with the States of Jersey, suggesting that two boats be provided. For his efforts, £150 was granted by the States, that would provide just one lifeboat, a carriage and boathouse. A lifeboat was constructed at Rozel of Trinity by Mr Lillington of Weymouth, and a boathouse was built at Havre des Pas. Jersey would have a lifeboat station in 1830.

No service records have been found for the 1830 lifeboat. But it is known that by 1861, the boat was unfit for purpose. A letter was sent to the RNLI by Philip De St Croix requesting that a new lifeboat and carriage be supplied, which was funded by the States of Jersey. The lifeboat was constructed by Forrestt of Limehouse, and tested on the Regent's Canal. The boat, equipment and carriage, constructed by Robinson of Camden Town, were then transported to Jersey free of charge by the Cheesewright and Miskin Steam Packet Company, arriving in November 1861.

On 2 November 1872, the Isabella Northcote was wrecked on the Écréhous rock. Two farmers and a labourer set out in a small boat, and saved 18 people. They were each awarded the RNLI Silver Medal.

In 1884, the RNLI station at Alderney was closed after operating for just 15 years, as there were difficulties in maintaining a crew. The closure came at the same time that the existing Jersey States lifeboat had become unfit for service. The offer of a replacement lifeboat from the RNLI was readily accepted, and a site near the Picket House at West Park (now People's Park) was provided, where a new boathouse was constructed at a cost of £385. A local management committee was formed, with Philip Baudins, Constable of St Helier, being appointed Honorary Secretary. The Alderney life-boat Mary and Victoria was transferred to St Helier in April 1884.

Mary and Victoria was never called in 15 years on service at Alderney, and as possibly the most underused lifeboat, she would also never be called in the next four years on service at St Helier. She was replaced in 1888 by one of three lifeboats funded from the bequest of the late Col. E. A. D. Brooshoft, of Kirk Ella, near Kingston upon Hull, the 34-foot lifeboat Sarah Brooshoft, Kirk Ella (ON 153).

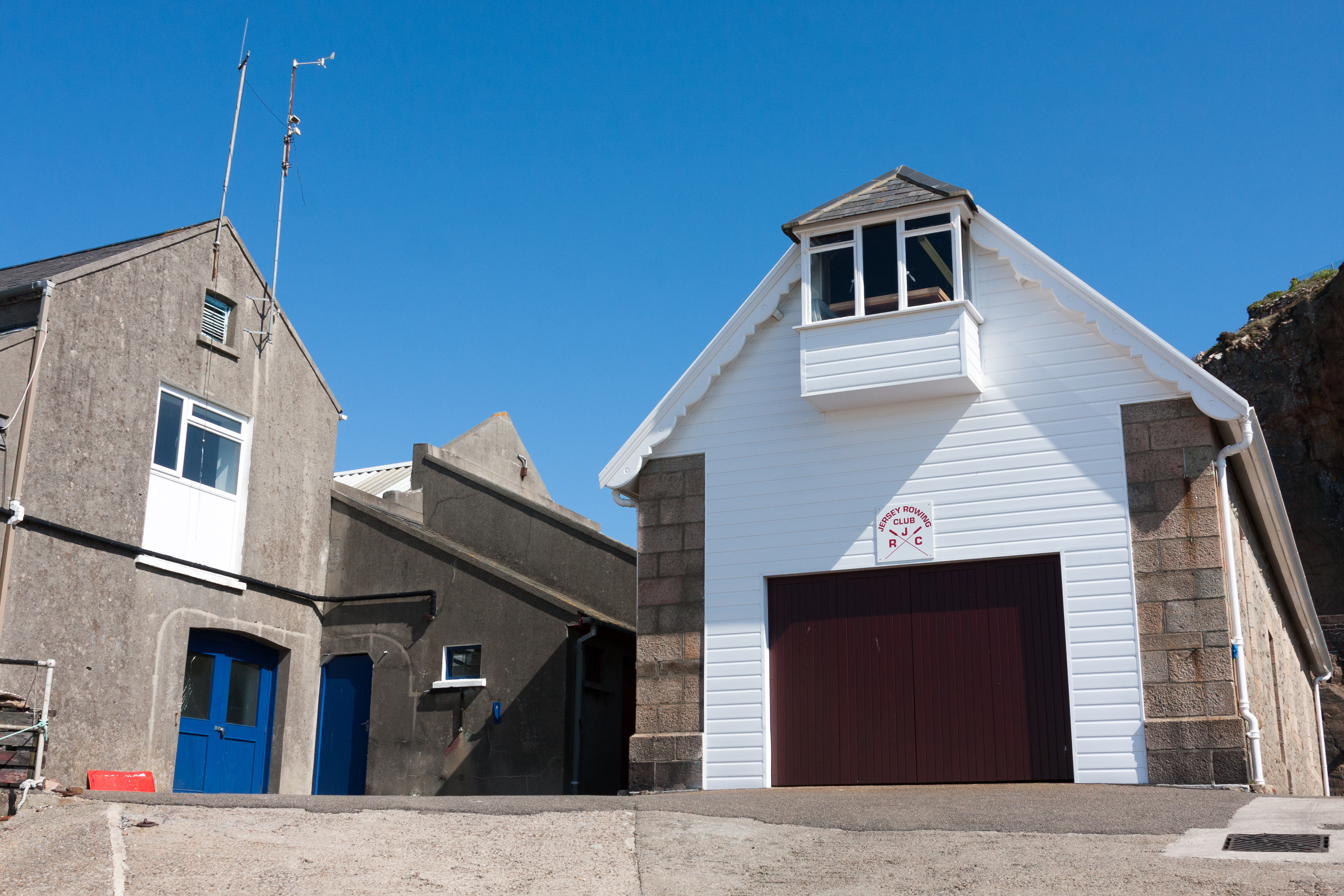
1896 St Helier Lifeboat House

Improvements to the Jersey promenade in 1896 required the West Park lifeboat house to be relocated. It was reconstructed on St Helier harbour, near South Pier, with a door at both ends, allowing the carriage and lifeboat to be accessed for transportation elsewhere should it be required. In 1912, the slipway was extended. The boathouse is used today by the Jersey Rowing Club.

In 1906, Jersey RNLI lifeboat would finally perform its first service, recovering three workmen by Breeches buoy, after they were stranded overnight on Demie de Pas lighthouse when the weather turned.

In 1929, a motor-powered lifeboat was placed at St Peter Port, Guernsey. At a meeting of the RNLI and the local Jersey branch, it was agreed that there was no longer a need for a lifeboat in Jersey, and the lifeboat was to be withdrawn. This was never actioned. St Helier would get their first motor-powered lifeboat, the Howard D (ON 797), a single engine Liverpool-class lifeboat, in 1937

Just a few days before the German invasion of Jersey in 1940, a last minute attempt was made to remove the lifeboat to England. The Guernsey relief lifeboat Alfred and Clara Heath (ON 672) was dispatched to collect the Jersey lifeboat, and tow it to the Isle of Wight, but on passage to Jersey, it was strafed by German aircraft and Harold Hobbs, son of the Coxswain Fred Hobbs, was killed. The attempt was ultimately abandoned, and the Guernsey lifeboat was allowed to return to Guernsey. Under German control for the next five years, it was later found that the St Helier lifeboat had been launched a number of times during the war, with the crew under German guard, and had saved 35 lives.

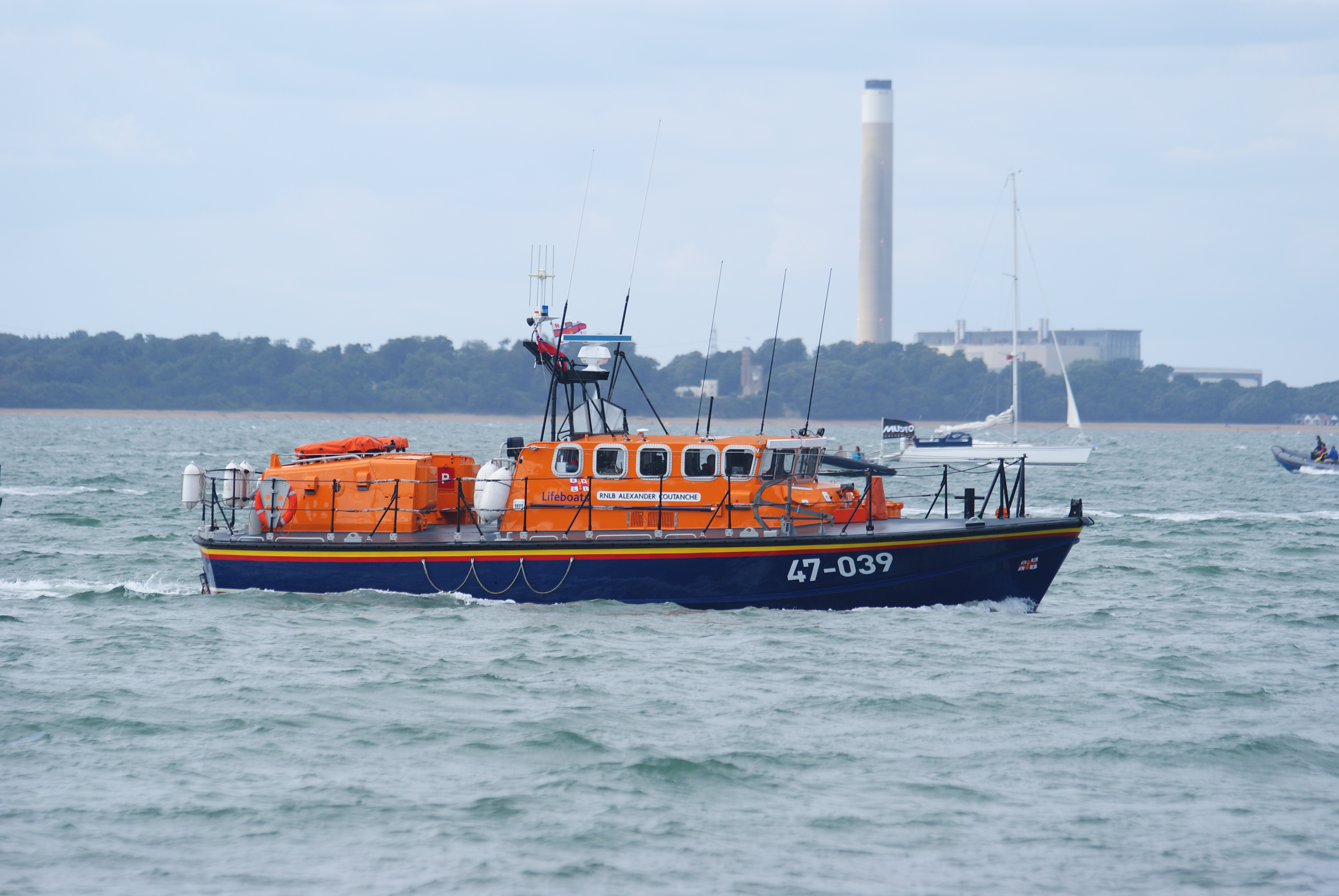
Tyne-class lifeboat 47-039 Alexander Coutanche (ON 1157)

On 13 September 1949. the 45-foot Watson relief lifeboat Hearts of Oak (ON 684) was launched to find a French aircraft. After 8 hours in rough seas, and with nothing found, the lifeboat was redirected to the aid of the yacht Maurice George. The yacht and four lives were saved. Coxswain Thomas James King was awarded the RNLI Gold Medal, with the rest of the crew being awarded bronze medals.

The Tyne-class lifeboat 47-039 Alexander Countanche (ON 1157) was placed on service in 1989. Coxswain Robert Vezier received the "Thanks of the Institution inscribed on Vellum" for his role when the lifeboat was involved in Jersey's biggest maritime disaster, a multi-agency rescue of 307 people from the French passenger catamaran Saint Malo operated by Channiland Ferries, was holed and starting to sink after hitting an object off La Corbière.

On 17 November 2017, a breakdown in relations between the RNLI and the Jersey Lifeboat Crew prompted the temporary removal from the island, of the Tamar-class lifeboat 16-12 George Sullivan (ON 1292). All Jersey lifeboat crew were stood down or resigned. Former crew members went on to form the independent lifeboat service Jersey Lifeboat Association, and currently operate a former RNLI lifeboat 47-018 Max Aitken III (ON 1126), now renamed Sir Max Aitken III.

The George Sullivan was returned to the Island on 5 December 2017, with full service resumed in March 2018, after further training of new crew.

On Monday 18 November 2024, a service of dedication was held at Jersey lifeboat station, to formally unveil a mural depicting former coxswain Thomas James King, painted on the side of the station building. The mural was commissioned to celebrate the 200th Anniversary of the RNLI. Lifeboat operations manager Nigel Sweeny said: "The mural is a very visible commemoration of a decorated lifeboatman and will serve to remind us of all those volunteers who have come before us."

It was announced by the RNLI on 2 October 2025, that following a strategic review of resources across the entire service, the three lifeboat stations in the Channel Islands, Alderney, St Peter Port in Guernsey and St Helier, would each be assigned a Shannon-class All-weather lifeboat over the following three years, replacing the Trent-class, Severn-class and Tamar-class lifeboats on station.

== Notable rescues ==
In 1949, Coxswain Thomas James King was awarded the RNLI Gold Medal, the Institutions highest award, for a double service. Returning towards home in poor conditions, in the reserve lifeboat Hearts of Oak (ON 684), after a six-hour search for a missing aircraft, the crew were tasked to the 10-tonne yacht Maurice Georges, which had run aground on the reef to the north-east of the Demie de Pas lighthouse. Risking an unfamiliar boat on the rocky shore, the Coxswain brought the lifeboat as close as possible to the yacht, managing to get a tow-line aboard, and pulled the vessel and three crew from likely catastrophe to safety. The lifeboat had been at sea for over nine hours. The seven lifeboat crew would each receive the RNLI Bronze Medal.

== Station honours ==
The following are awards made at St Helier, Jersey.

- RNIPLS Gold Medal

Francis De St Croix – 1825
Jean De St Croix – 1825
Philip De St Croix – 1825

- RNLI Gold Medal

Thomas James King, Coxswain – 1949

- RNIPLS Silver Medal

Philip Nicholle – 1825

- RNLI Silver Medal

Charles Blampied, Farmer – 1872
John Bouchard, Labourer – 1872
Elias Whitley, Farmer – 1872

Edward Larbelestier, Coxswain – 1951

Michael Edward Berry, Coxswain – 1974

Michael Edward Berry, Coxswain – 1983 (Second-Service clasp)

- RNLI Bronze Medal

Philip Boutell, crew member – 1949
Kenneth S. Gubbey, crew member – 1949
David Robert Talbot, crew member – 1949
Charles George King, crew member – 1949
Reginald John Nicholle, crew member – 1949
George Stapely, crew member – 1949
Lionel Percival Stevens, Honorary Secretary, crew member – 1949

Silver Harry Le Riche, Acting Coxswain – 1950

Michael Edward Berry, Coxswain – 1983

- The Thanks of the Institution inscribed on Vellum

Edward Larbalestier, Coxswain – 1953

Eric Grandin, Coxswain – 1967

St Helier Lifeboat Crew – 1974

St Helier Lifeboat Crew – 1983

Robert Vezier, Coxswain – 1995

- Letters of commendation signed by the Chairman of the Institution

Coxswain and Crew – 1964

- Member, Order of the British Empire (MBE)

Capt. Roy Malcolm Bullen – 1997QBH

== St Helier lifeboats ==
=== States of Jersey lifeboats ===
Name	On station	Class	Comments
Unnamed	1830–1861	A lifeboat	
Unnamed	1861–1884	30-foot Peake Self-righting (P&S)	(Note: 30-foot x 7-foot (8-oared) Peake-class self-righting (P&S) lifeboat, built by Forrestt of Limehouse, London.)

=== Pulling and Sailing (P&S) lifeboats ===
ON (Note: ON is the RNLI's Official Number of the boat.)	Name	Built	On station	Class	Comments
Pre-532	Mary and Victoria	1869	1884–1888	33-foot Peake Self-righting (P&S)	(Note: 33-foot x 8-foot 7in (10-oared) Peake-class self-righting (P&S) lifeboat, gift of the Earl of Strafford, built by Forrestt of Limehouse, London, costing £276 when new.); Previously at Alderney.
153	Sarah Brooshoft, Kirk Ella	1887	1888–1910	34-foot Self-righting (P&S)	(Note: 34-foot x 8-foot (10-oared) self-righting (P&S) lifeboat, legacy of Col. E. A. D. Brooshoft of Kirk Ella, Yorkshire, built by Watkins & Co. of Blackwall, London, costing £409 when new.); Previously Mary Isabella at Seaton Carew
370	Lily Bird	1894	1910–1912	34-foot Self-righting (P&S)	(Note: 34-foot x 8-foot (10-oared) self-righting (P&S) lifeboat, gift of Mr S. Bird of East Cowes, built by Forrestt of Limehouse, London, costing £370 when new.); Reserve lifeboat No.5, previously at Dunwich and Aberystwyth.
625	William Henry Wilkinson	1911	1912–1937	35-foot Self-righting (P&S)	(Note: 35-foot x 8-foot 6in (10-oared) self-righting (P&S) lifeboat, gift of Miss E. Wilkinson of Brixton, built by the Thames Ironworks, of Blackwall, London, costing £979.)

Pre ON numbers are unofficial numbers used by the Lifeboat Enthusiast Society to reference early lifeboats not included on the official RNLI list.

=== All-weather lifeboats ===
ON	Op. No. (Note: Op. No. is the RNLI's Operational Number of the boat carried on the hull.)	Name	Built	On station	Class	Comments
797	–	Howard D	1937	1937–1948	Liverpool	(Note: Liverpool-class lifeboat, built by Saunders Roe, single 35 hp engine providing 7¼ knots, costing £3,623.)
865	–	Elizabeth Rippon	1948	1948–1975	46-foot 9in Watson	
1034	44-013	Thomas James King	1974	1975–1989	Waveney	
1157	47-039	Alexander Coutanche	1989	1989–2009	Tyne	
1292	16-12	George Sullivan	2009	2009–	Tamar	

=== Inshore lifeboats ===
Op. No.	Name	On station	Class	Comments
B-756	Eve Pank	2005–2007	B-class (Atlantic 75)	
B-816	David Page	2007–2022	B-class (Atlantic 85)	
B-934	The Spirit of St Helier	2022–	B-class (Atlantic 85)	

== See also ==
- List of RNLI stations
- List of former RNLI stations
- Royal National Lifeboat Institution lifeboats
