= Alderney Lifeboat Station =

RNLI lifeboat station on Alderney, Channel Islands

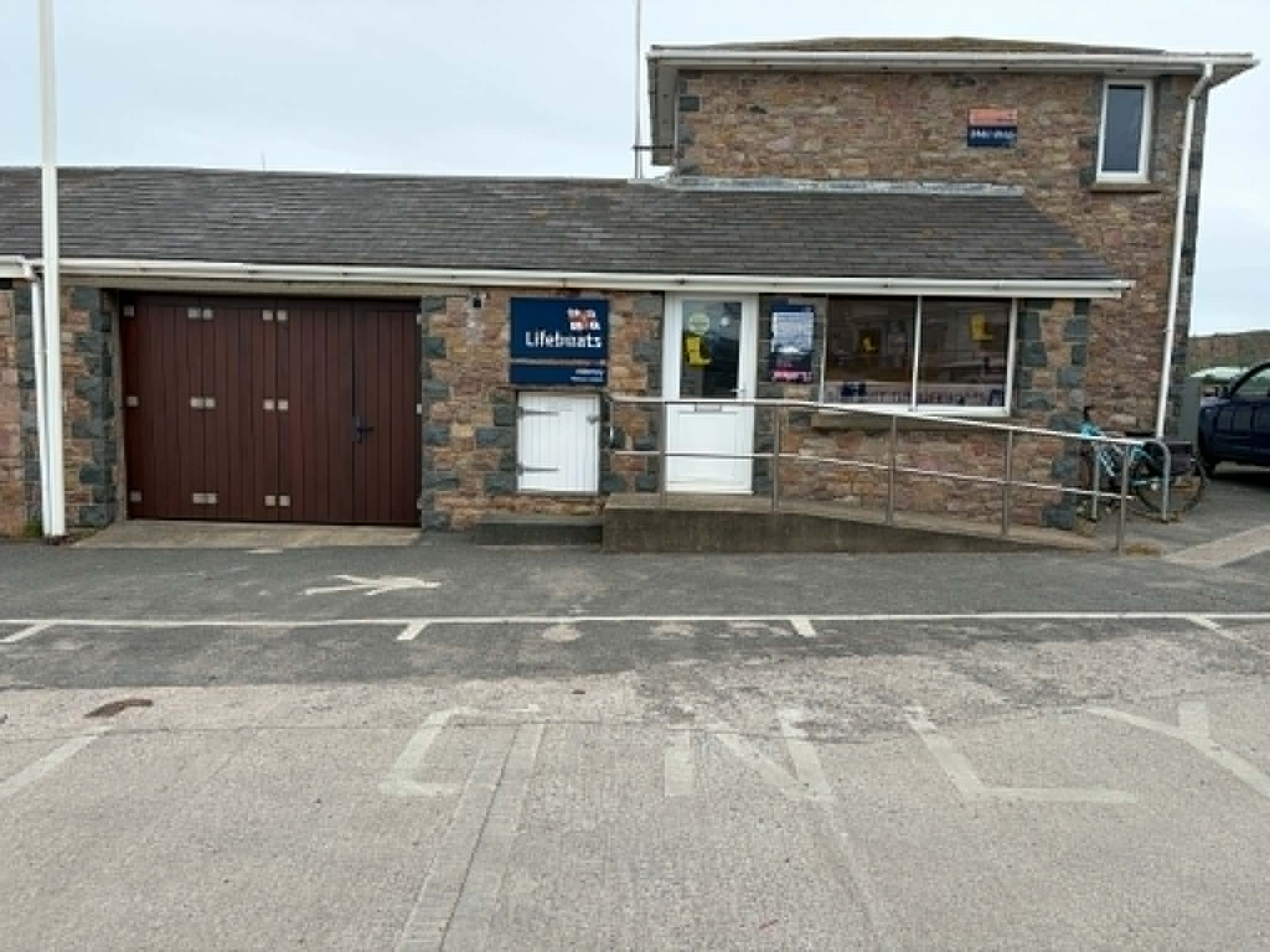
- Alderney Lifeboat Station

- Location within Channel Islands

General information
- Type: RNLI Lifeboat Station
- Location: Braye Harbour, Alderney, Channel Islands, GY9 3XX
- Coordinates: 49°43′26.5″N 2°12′00.6″W
- Opened: 1869–1884; 1984
- Owner: Royal National Lifeboat Institution

Website
- Alderney RNLI Lifeboat Station

Alderney Lifeboat Station is located at Braye Harbour, on the island of Alderney, the northernmost of the inhabited Channel Islands. It is part of the Bailiwick of Guernsey, a British Crown dependency.

A lifeboat was first stationed at St Anne on Alderney by the Royal National Lifeboat Institution (RNLI) in 1869, but was closed in 1884. The station was re-established 100 years later at Braye harbour in 1984.

The station currently operates an Trent-class All-weather lifeboat, 14-29 Inner Wheel II (ON 1245), on station since 2024.

== History ==
On 19 October 1865, before the establishment of a lifeboat station at Alderney, Gunner James Moore of the Coast Brigade, Royal Artillery, was awarded the RNLI Silver Medal, when along with two colleagues, rescued all 17 men from the French vessel Carioca, on passage from Le Havre to Rio de Janeiro, when it struck the rocks at Point d'Else.

At a meeting of the RNLI committee of management on Thursday 5 March 1869, with consideration to an application by local residents, and the report by the Inspector of Lifeboats, it was decided to establish a lifeboat station at St Anne on Alderney. "As shipwrecks have occasionally taken place there with a lamentable loss of life, and as there was no difficulty in procuring a good crew, it was considered highly desirable that there should be a life-boat stationed on the Island, and the local residents had made application to the Society accordingly."

A strategic location was found for a boathouse, constructed at a cost of £235, which would allow the lifeboat to be conveyed on its carriage to suitable launching sites. In October 1869, a 33-foot self-righting 'Pulling and Sailing' (P&S) lifeboat, one with both oars and sails, was dispatched by rail to Weymouth, from where it was towed by HMS Seamew to the Island, carrying the carriage and equipment onboard.

The day after arrival on Alderney, the lifeboat was taken in procession through the streets of St Anne to the pier, followed by members of the lifeboat committee, members of the Independent Order of Odd Fellows and other societies, seamen from HMS Seamew, soldiers of the Royal Artillery, and the band of the Royal Alderney Militia Artillery.

A gift to the Institution of £450 for a lifeboat was received from George Byng, 2nd Earl of Strafford PC, and at his request, the lifeboat was named Mary and Victoria.

In her 15 years on station, the lifeboat was never required. With many fishermen leaving the island in the 1880s, it became impossible to maintain a crew, and the station was closed in 1884. The lifeboat was relocated to St Helier on Jersey.

== 1984 onwards ==
A period of 100 years would pass, before the RNLI would re-establish a lifeboat station on Alderney. In January 1984, a new design Brede-class lifeboat, 33-08 Foresters Future (ON 1090), was sent there, initially for a 12-month evaluation period. A new station was officially opened on 10 May 1985 by H.R.H. The Duchess of Kent, who presented "The Thanks of the Institution inscribed on Vellum" to John Kay-Mouat, President of the States of Alderney, for the life-saving work carried out by private boats during the previous 100 years, when there was no lifeboat on the island.

During a remarkable period of four months in 1986, Alderney would see the award of three bronze medals, and five crew members accorded 'The Thanks of the Institution inscribed on Vellum'. On 4 May, four people and the yacht Sea Victor were saved after suffering engine difficulties in a southerly gale. Six people and the yacht Seylla II were saved in a force 10 gale on 25 August, and the following day, one person and the yacht Gypsy Rover were saved in another force 10 gale. Coxswain Stephen Shaw and Second Coxswain Martin Harwood would both received the RNLI Bronze Medal, with Shaw awarded a second medal (second-service clasp).

The Waveney-class lifeboat 44-019 Louis Marchesi of Round Table (ON 1045) replaced Foresters Future in 1986, serving at Alderney for the next eight years. In 1994, Alderney would be the first station to receive the new Trent-class lifeboat. Relief and trial lifeboat 14-01 Earl and Countess Mountbatten of Burma (ON 1180) was placed on service temporarily on 7 March 1994, awaiting the arrival of a new production version lifeboat.

Mr Fredrick Roy Barker (1909–1992), known as Roy, was the only son of a Lincolnshire farming family, and after studying animal medicine and husbandry at university, followed by a business degree in the US, he went on to become the managing director and Chairman of Banbury Stockyard in Oxfordshire, the largest livestock trading centre in Europe. Selling the company in the early 1970s, he moved to Jersey, where he was able to fully enjoy his love for sailing and the sea. He left his entire estate to the RNLI, with the request that the income received from the fund be known as the Roy Barker Memorial Fund. The Roy Barker Memorial Fund has helped fund the Tamar-class lifeboat and boathouse at The Mumbles, a Shannon-class lifeboat at New Quay, and three other Trent-class lifeboats, including ones at Wick in Scotland, and Howth in Ireland. It has also funded the SLARS tractor unit at Llandudno.

The first of the Trent-class life boats funded by the Roy Barker Memorial Fund, was named 14-04 Roy Barker I (ON 1199), arriving at Alderney on 21 July 1995.

Alderney would receive an additional lifeboat in 1997, when the D-class (EA16) Inshore lifeboat Bacchus (D-410) was placed at the station. Two years later, the Inshore lifeboat was replaced with another D-class (EA16) boat, Spirit of Alderney (D-551).

On 9 August 2002, a 13-year-old was swept into the sea at the Fort Clonque causeway, followed by her 16-year-old friend and a passer-by, in their attempts to help the girl. Awards were made to five members of Alderney lifeboat station, for their exceptional efforts in the rescue of all three people. Helm of the Inshore lifeboat Philip Murray was awarded the RNLI Bronze Medal.

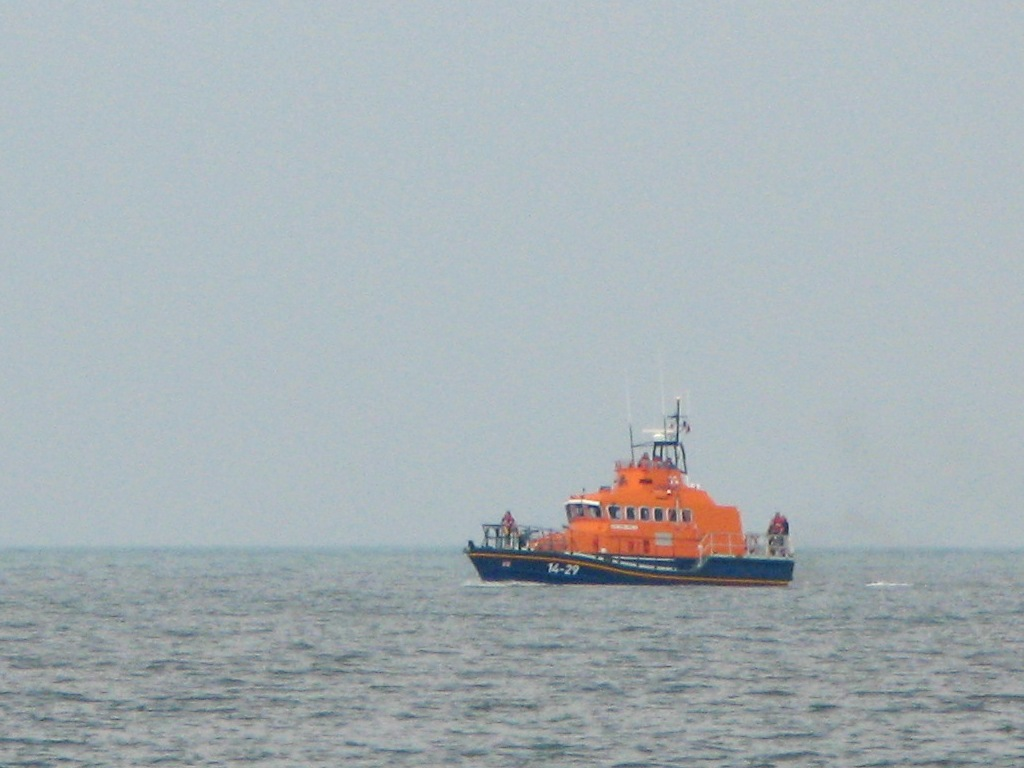
Trent-class All-weather lifeboat 14-29 Inner Wheel II (ON 1245)

In 2008, towards the end of her 10-year service, it was decided not to replace the Inshore lifeboat, and Spirit of Alderney (D-551) was withdrawn in 2009. The station maintains a former D-class (IB1) lifeboat with reduced equipment levels as a boarding boat, Ollie Naismith (D-741-BB) (2022–), which can still be used as an Inshore lifeboat if required.

After 30-years service, Roy Barker I (ON 1199) was retired in September 2024. The replacement was a slightly newer Trent-class lifeboat, a 24-year-old boat built in 2000. RNLB 14-29 Inner Wheel II (ON 1245) had previously served at Barry Dock in South Wales.

On 2 October 2025, the RNLI announced that following a strategic review of resources, the three lifeboat stations in the Channel Islands, St Helier in Jersey, St Peter Port in Guernsey, and Alderney, would each be assigned a Shannon-class All-weather lifeboat over the following three years, replacing the Severn-class, Tamar-class and Trent-class lifeboats on station.

== Station honours ==
The following are awards made at Alderney:

- RNLI Silver Medal
  Gunner James Moore, Coast Brigade, Royal Artillery – 1865
- RNLI Bronze Medal
  Capt. Arthur Daniel Jennings, Harbour Master – 1962
  Stephen Eric Shaw, Coxswain – 1986
  Stephen Eric Shaw, Coxswain – 1986 (Second-Service clasp)
  Martin John Harwood, Second Coxswain – 1986
  Philip Murray, Helm – 2002
- The Thanks of the Institution inscribed on Vellum
  Stephen Shaw, Coxswain – 1985
  John Kay-Mouat, President of the States of Alderney – 1985
  for the life-saving work carried out by private boats in Alderney during the 100 years in which there was no lifeboat on the island.
  Michael O’Gorman, Assistant Mechanic – 1986
  Nigel Rose, Mechanic – 1986
  Michael O’Gorman, Assistant Mechanic – 1986
  James McDonald, crew member – 1986
  Stephen Shaw, Coxswain – 1986
  Martin Harwood, Second Coxswain – 1986
  Stephen Shaw, Coxswain – 1997
  Martin Harwood, Second Coxswain – 1997
  Mark Gaudion, crew member – 2002
  David McAllister, Station Honorary Secretary – 2002
  Declan Goudion, Coxswain – 2007
  Steven Wright, Deputy Second Coxswain – 2007
  Dean Geran, crew member – 2007
- A Framed Letter of Thanks signed by the Chairman of the Institution
  Francois Jean – 2002
  Wayne Chandler – 2002
- Officer, Order of the British Empire (OBE)
  John Kay-Mouat, President of the States of Alderney, and Alderney RNLI Branch Chairman – 1994QBH
- Member, Order of the British Empire (MBE)
  Stephen Eric Shaw, Coxswain – 2002QBH

== Alderney lifeboats ==
=== Pulling and Sailing (P&S) lifeboats ===
ON (Note: ON is the RNLI's Official Number of the boat.)	Name	Built	On station	Class	Comments
Pre-532	Mary and Victoria	1869	1869–1884	33-foot Peake Self-righting (P&S)	(Note: 33-foot x 8-foot 7in (10-oared) Peake-class self-righting (P&S) lifeboat, gift of the Earl of Strafford, built by Forrestt of Limehouse, London, costing £276.); Transferred to St Helier in 1884.

Station Closed, 1884
Pre ON numbers are unofficial numbers used by the Lifeboat Enthusiasts' Society, to reference early lifeboats not included on the official RNLI list.

=== All-weather lifeboats ===
ON	Op. No. (Note: Op. No. is the RNLI's Operational Number of the boat carried on the hull.)	Name	Built	On station	Class	Comments
1090	33-08	Foresters Future	1984	1984–1986	Brede	
1045	44-019	Louis Marchesi of Round Table	1977	1986–1994	Waveney	Previously at Newhaven
1180	14-01	Earl and Countess Mountbatten of Burma	1991	1994–1995	Trent	Initially used for trials
1199	14-04	Roy Barker I	1994	1995–2024	Trent	
1245	14-29	Inner Wheel II	2000	2024–	Trent	Previously at Barry Dock

More post-service details can be found on the respective lifeboat class pages.

=== Inshore lifeboats ===
Op. No.	Name	On station	Class	Comments
D-410	Bacchus	1997–1999	D-class (EA16)	
D-551	Spirit of Alderney	1999–2009	D-class (EA16)	

Inshore lifeboat withdrawn in 2009

== See also ==
- List of RNLI stations
- List of former RNLI stations
- Royal National Lifeboat Institution lifeboats
