= Donaghadee Lifeboat Station =

RNLI lifeboat station in County Down, Northern Ireland

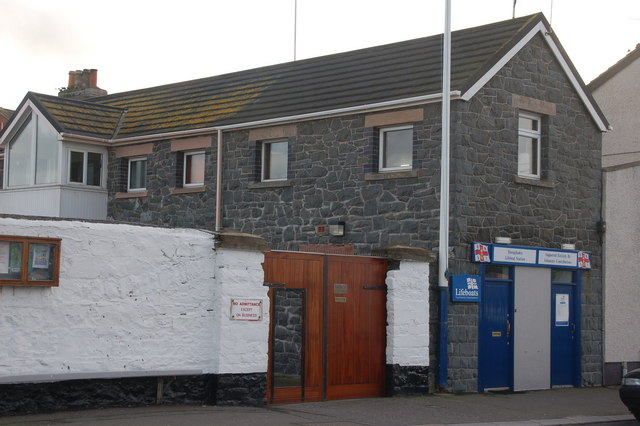
- Donaghadee Lifeboat Station

- Location within Northern Ireland

General information
- Type: RNLI Lifeboat Station
- Location: The Parade, Donaghadee, County Down, BT21 0DG, Northern Ireland
- Coordinates: 54°38′36.2″N 5°31′55.3″W
- Opened: 1910
- Owner: Royal National Lifeboat Institution

Website
- Donaghadee RNLI Lifeboat Station

Donaghadee Lifeboat Station is located at the Parade, in Donaghadee, a harbour town approximately 19 miles (31 km) east of Belfast, on the east coast of County Down, Northern Ireland.

A lifeboat was first stationed at Donaghadee in 1910 by the Royal National Lifeboat Institution (RNLI).

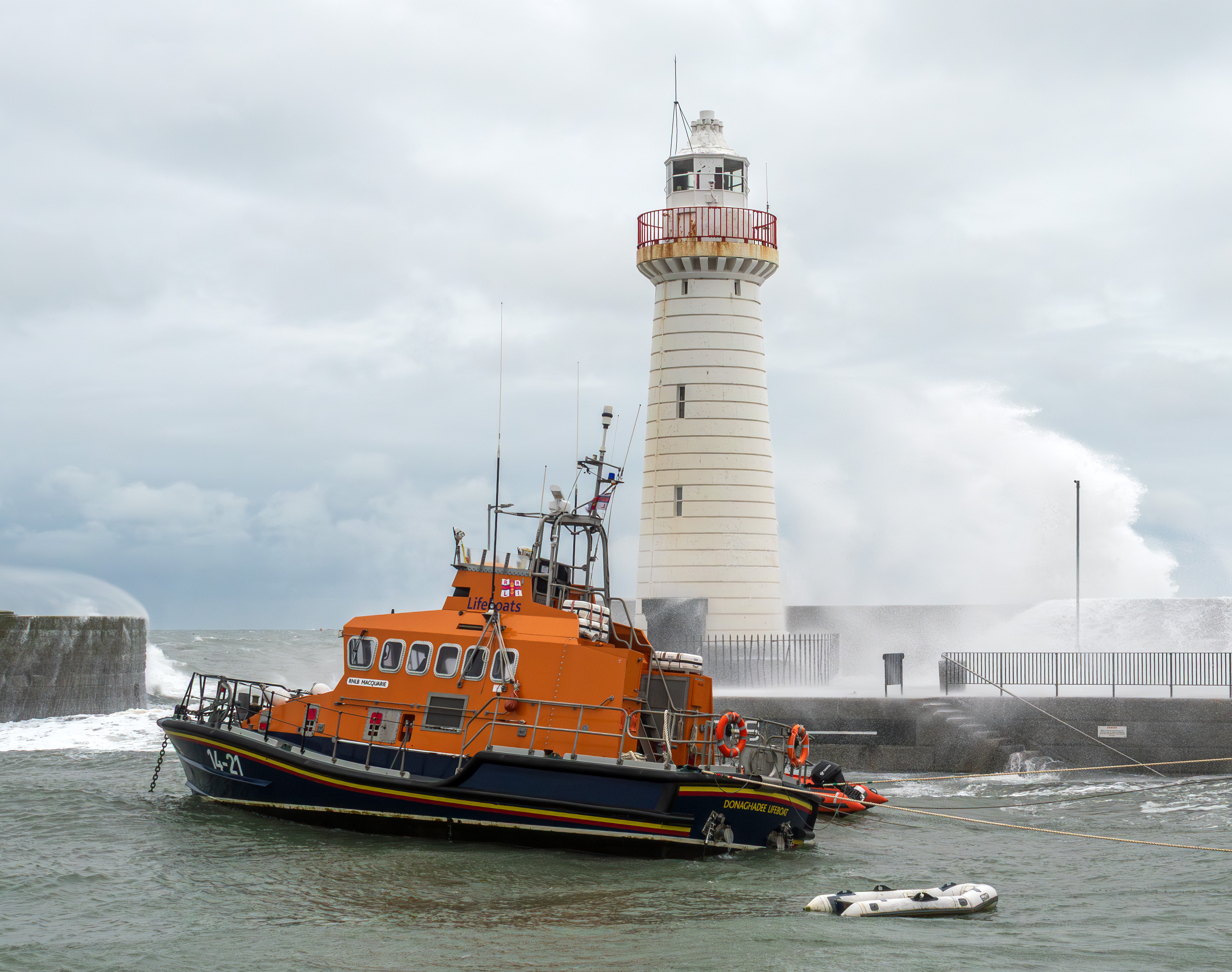
Trent-class lifeboat 14-21 MacQuarie (ON 1225)

The station currently operates the All-weather Trent-class lifeboat, 14-21 MacQuarie (ON 1225), on station since 2023.

== History ==
In 1907, the RNLI received the considerable bequest of £7571-18s-7d, the legacy of the late Mrs A. W. Clarke Hall, who specified a lifeboat was to be provided for the north coast of Ireland, and to be named William and Laura. It was decided to place the lifeboat at Donaghadee.

At a time when most lifeboat stations were still operating 'Pulling and Sailing' (P&S) lifeboats, ones with oars and sails, with one still in operation at Whitby up to 1957, Donaghadee's first lifeboat would be one of the earliest motor-powered lifeboats. A 43-foot Watson-class lifeboat was constructed by Thames Ironworks of Blackwall, London, with a 40-hp 'Blake' engine.

Departing Harwich on 1 July 1910 under her own power, the Donaghadee lifeboat travelled up the east coast of England, transiting to the west coast via the Forth and Clyde Canal, and arriving at Donaghadee 11 days later.

At a ceremony in September, the president of Donaghadee RNLI, Mr Charles Dunbar Butler, and Miss Slade, representing the late donor, handed the lifeboat to the care of the station, and the boat was duly named William and Laura (ON 595).

The Donaghadee lifeboat William and Laura was called on 12 November 1915, to the aid of the French lugger Cyrano, of Brest, stranded in a NE gale, 2 miles (3.2 km) off Millisle. Some doubt was made as to whether the lifeboat would make it out of the harbour in the conditions, but the lifeboat performed well, and six crew were rescued from the French vessel. Silver medals and diplomas were awarded to the lifeboat crew by the French Government.

In 1917, Coxswain William G. Nelson drowned in a fishing accident.

Donaghadee lifeboat Civil Service No.5 (ON 753) was launched at 06:30 on 21 November 1940, to the steamship Coastville of Liverpool, when the vessel was wrecked on the rocks at Ballymacormick Point in Belfast Lough. The crew of seven were rescued. Just 15 days later, in gale-force conditions. nine of the 43 men aboard the SS Hope Star of Newcastle-upon-Tyne were brought ashore by the lifeboat, the rest of the crew refusing to leave the vessel. After landing the men, the lifeboat returned, and stood by until conditions improved. For these services, Coxswain Samuel Nelson was awarded the RNLI Bronze Medal.

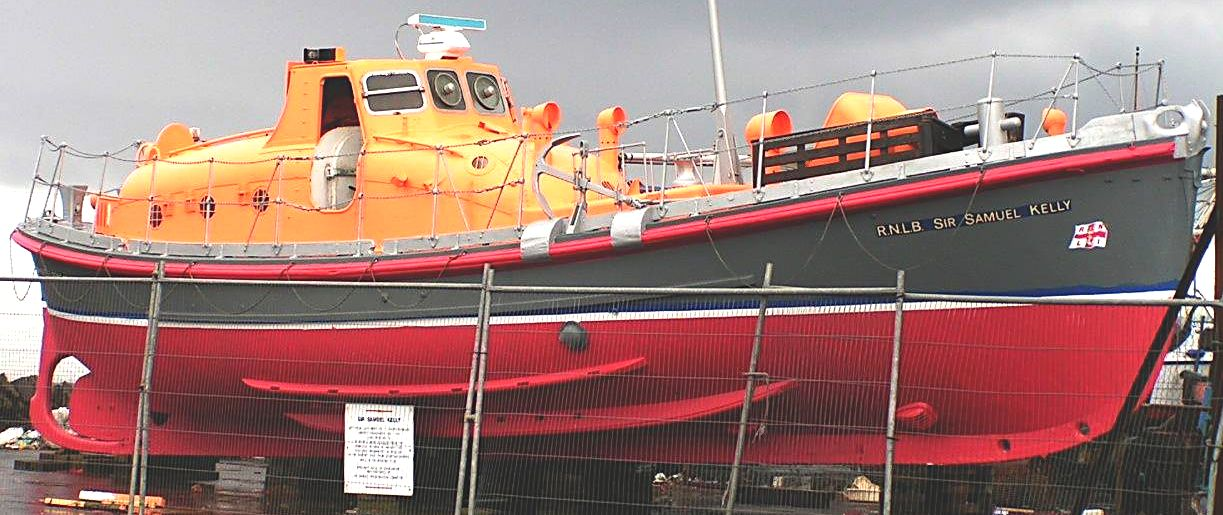
Sir Samuel Kelly (ON 885), under restoration

At a naming ceremony of 17 August 1950, the third lifeboat to be placed at Donaghadee, a 46ft 9in Watson-class, was named Sir Samuel Kelly (ON 885), the gift of Lady Mary Kelly of Crawfordsburn, Co. Down, in memory of her husband, a coal merchant and philanthropist.

On 17 July, the cargo ship MV Douglas of Bergen ran aground north of Larne near The Maidens lighthouses, County Antrim. Holed and taking on water, but in no immediate danger, the lifeboat was requested to stand by. A tug tried to tow the vessel off the rocks the following day, but was unsuccessful. Eventually it was decided the lifeboat was no longer required, and after landing four of the crew at Larne, headed for home. The lifeboat had been 'stood by' for 53 hours.

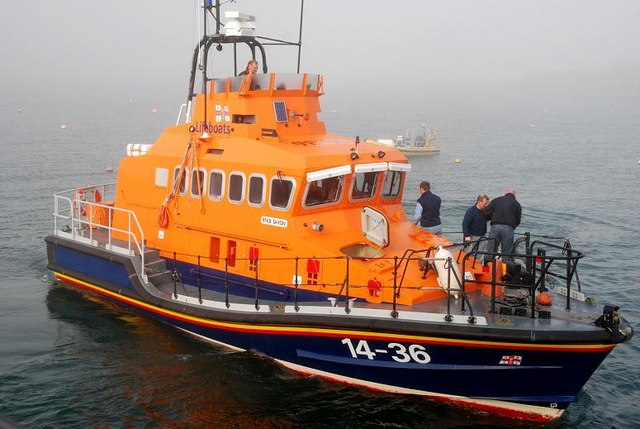
Trent-class lifeboat 14-36 Saxon (ON 1267)

On 17 April 2003, a new Trent-class lifeboat was placed at Donaghadee, replacing the Arun-class lifeboat 52-33 City of Belfast (ON 1107), which had been on station since 1985. At a ceremony in September 2003, the new lifeboat was named 14-36 Saxon (ON 1267), funded from the legacy of Mrs Freda Rivers, in memory of her late husband.

At 02:15, on 13 September 2009, the crew of Saxon were woken by their pagers. The lifeboat was launched in just seven minutes, to the yacht Bentim Buoys, with three elderly crew members aboard, and aground on the rocks near Ballywalter. After great difficult getting a reliable line to the vessel, in conditions of force 5–6, the yacht was pulled off the rocks, which was found to be watertight, and towed to harbour, arriving at 05:00. Coxswain Philip McNamara was accorded "The Thanks of the Institution inscribed on Vellum".

In 2023, it was announced that Saxon had been withdrawn from the station needing repair work. The relief Trent-class lifeboat 14-21 MacQuarie (ON 1225), was placed on service, and has subsequently become the permanent lifeboat at Donaghadee.

== Princess Victoria ==
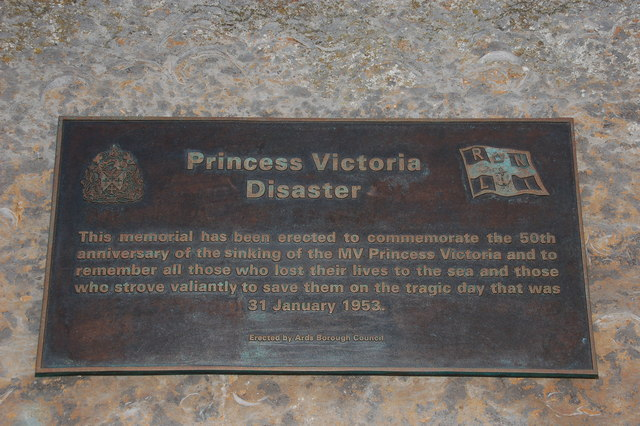
Princess Victoria memorial plaque, Donaghadee

Much has been documented elsewhere about the loss of the vehicle and passenger ferry MV Princess Victoria. The vessel, with 176 people on board, was operated by British Railways between Stranraer and Larne, and sank in a severe gale in the North Channel on 31 January 1953, approximately seven miles east of the entrance to Belfast Lough, with the loss of 135 lives. The raging seas had burst open the car-deck doors.

Lifeboats from Newcastle, Cloughey, Portpatrick and Donaghadee were all called, making multiple launches, and spending many hours searching for survivors. The Donaghadee picked up 29 people from one of the ship's lifeboats, a man in another boat, and one man on a raft. Coxswains William McConnell (Portpatrick) and Hugh Nelson (Donaghadee) were each awarded the RNLI Bronze Medal. Both men were subsequently awarded the Medal of the Order of the British Empire.

== The Nelsons of Donaghadee ==
It is not uncommon for many generations of the same family to be involved with the town's lifeboat. In the case of Donaghadee, it is the Nelson family. At least four, William, Samuel, Hugh and Alex, have served as Coxswain, with two of the four awarded medals for gallantry. In the search for survivors from the Princess Victoria in 1953, at least six members of the family were out at some time, if not all together. In 2021, Mark Nelson received the 20-year long service award.

== Station honours ==
The following are awards made at Donaghadee.

- Medal of the Order of the British Empire
  Hugh Nelson, Coxswain – 1953
- Silver Medals and Diplomas, awarded by the French Government
  Donaghadee lifeboat crew – 1915
- RNLI Bronze Medal
  Samuel Nelson, Coxswain – 1941
  Hugh Nelson, Coxswain – 1953
- 'The Thanks of the Institution inscribed on Vellum'
  Philip McNamara, Coxswain – 2010
- 'A Framed Letter of Thanks signed by the Chairman of the Institution'
  James Bunting, Coxswain/Assistant Mechanic – 1981
- Member, Order of the British Empire (MBE)
  David T. McKibben, J.P., Honorary Secretary – 1957NYH
  Thomas Walker Simpson, Deputy Coxswain/Mechanic – 2002QBH
- British Empire Medal
  William Tanner Lennon, Coxswain – 1991QBH

== Donaghadee lifeboats ==
=== All-weather lifeboats ===
ON (Note: ON is the RNLI's Official Number of the boat.)	Op.No. (Note: Op. No. is the RNLI's Operational Number of the boat carried on the hull.)	Name	Built	On station	Class	Comments
595	–	William and Laura	1909	1910–1932	43-foot Watson	Transferred to Arranmore
753	–	Civil Service No.5	1932	1932–1950	45-foot 6in Watson	Transferred to Port St Mary
885	–	Sir Samuel Kelly	1950	1950–1976	46-foot 9in Watson	
1043	44-017	The Nelsons of Donaghadee	1976	1976–1978	Waveney	Transferred to the relief fleet. Later at Sunderland
928	–	Lilla Marras, Douglas and Will	1955	1978–1979	46-foot 9in Watson	Previously at Cromarty and Falmouth.
1005	44-006	Arthur and Blanche Harris	1968	1979–1985	Waveney	Previously at Barry Dock. Returned to the Relief fleet, later at Courtmacsherry Harbour.
1107	52-33	City of Belfast	1985	1985–2003	Arun	
1267	14-36	Saxon	2003	2003–2023	Trent	
1225	14-21	MacQuarie	1997	2023–	Trent	

== See also ==
- List of RNLI stations
- List of former RNLI stations
- Royal National Lifeboat Institution lifeboats
