= Port St Mary Lifeboat Station =

RNLI lifeboat station on the Isle of Man

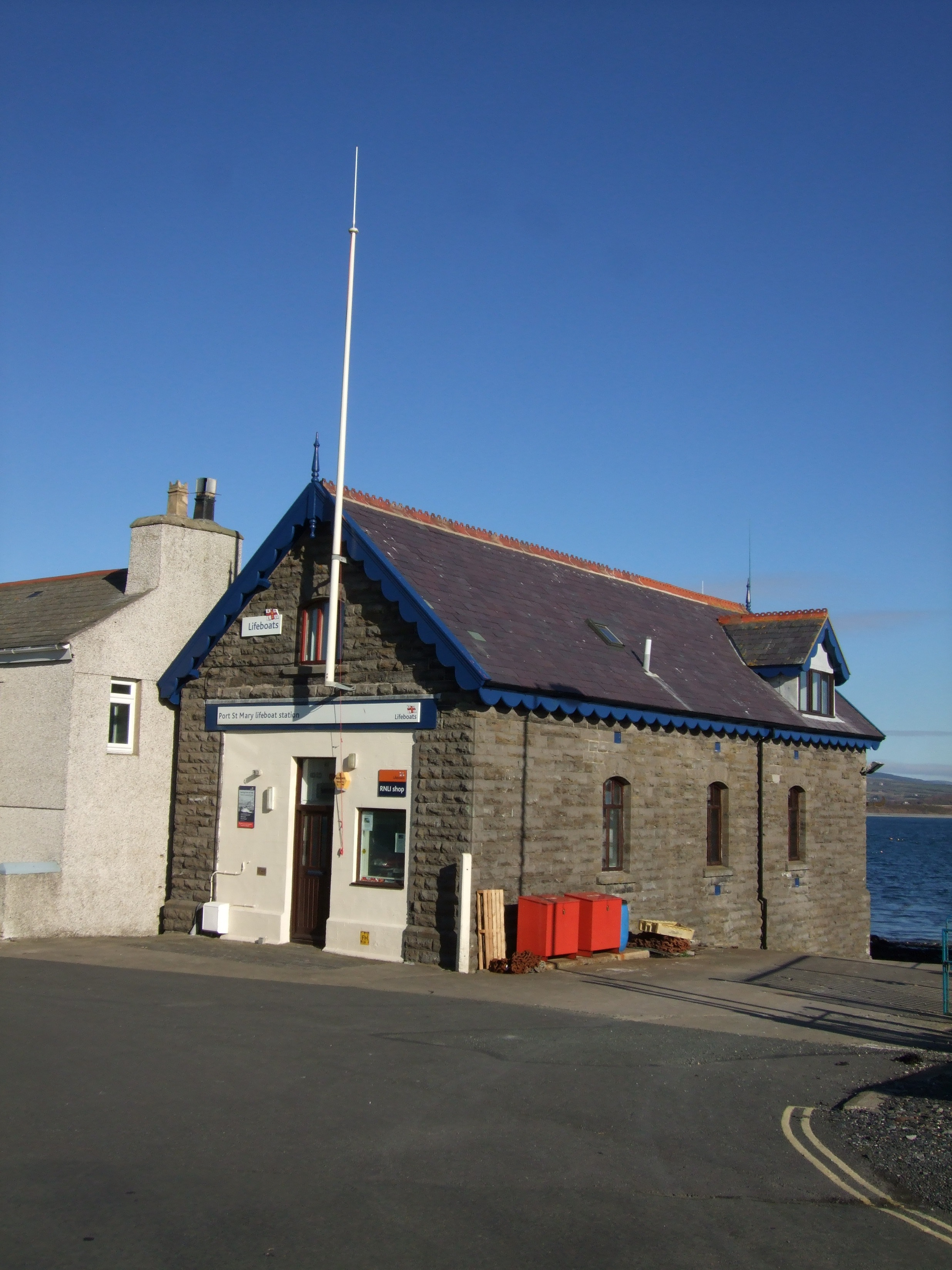
- Port St Mary Lifeboat Station

- Location within Isle of Man

General information
- Type: RNLI Lifeboat Station
- Location: Lime Street, Port St Mary, IM9 5EF, Isle of Man
- Coordinates: 54°04′13.5″N 4°44′4.5″W
- Opened: 1896
- Owner: Royal National Lifeboat Institution

Website
- Port St Mary RNLI Lifeboat Station

Port St Mary Lifeboat Station is located at Lime Street, in Port St Mary, a harbour town approximately 13.5 miles (21.7 km) south-west of Douglas, on the south coast of the Isle of Man, a British Crown Dependency.

A lifeboat station was established at Port St Mary in 1896, by the Royal National Lifeboat Institution (RNLI).

The station currently operates a Trent-class All-weather lifeboat, 14-15 Henry Heys Duckworth (ON 1213), on station since 2025, due to be retied in 2028, and a small D-class (IB1) Inshore lifeboat, Frank Martin (D-873), on station since 2023.

== History ==
The report of the Deputy Chief Inspector of Lifeboats was read at the meeting of the RNLI committee of management on 11 April 1895, following his visit to the Isle of Man. At a subsequent meeting on 13 June 1895, it was decided to close the Port Erin lifeboat station, and relocate to Port St Mary.

However, the intended closure of Port Erin lifeboat station never materialised, but a new station was established at Port St Mary in 1896. It was one of six lifeboat stations to operate on the Island, although Castletown Lifeboat Station closed in 1922, leaving the five stations that exist on the Isle of Man today.

In 1894, the RNLI was bequeathed the enormous sum of £50,000 (equivalent to £5,619,000 in 2025), from the estate of Mr James Stevens, a developer, from Edgbaston in Birmingham. This donation provided more lifeboats (20), than any other single donation received by the RNLI.

Port St Mary would receive the first one, a new 'Pulling and Sailing' (P&S) lifeboat, one with both (10) oars, and sails, named James Stevens No.1 (ON 401), and costing £463. James Stevens No.1 was in service for 21 years, launching 22 times, and saving 55 lives.

Also in 1896, work commenced on the construction of a boat house on Lime Street costing £375, which was completed over the next two years, and which is still in use to this day.

The station received their first motor-powered lifeboat, Sir Heath Harrison (ON 785) in 1936. This was over 100 years after the founder of the RNLI, Sir William Hillary, had advocated the use of powered lifeboats.

Keen seafarers and philanthropists James and Ann Ritchie, of the Isle of Man brewing company Heron and Brearley, decided to fund a lifeboat for Ramsey, which turned out to be shortly before James' death in 1970. James' widow Ann Ritchie, née Gough, decided to fund a second lifeboat, and in 1976, Port St Mary received a new Arun-class lifeboat, 54-06 The Gough Ritchie (ON 1051).

After Ann Ritchie's death in 1990, the residue of her estate became the Gough Ritchie Charitable Trust. One third of its income is distributed to the RNLI, for use on the Isle of Man, and in 1998, this funded a second boat for Port St Mary, Trent-class 14-26 Gough Ritchie II.

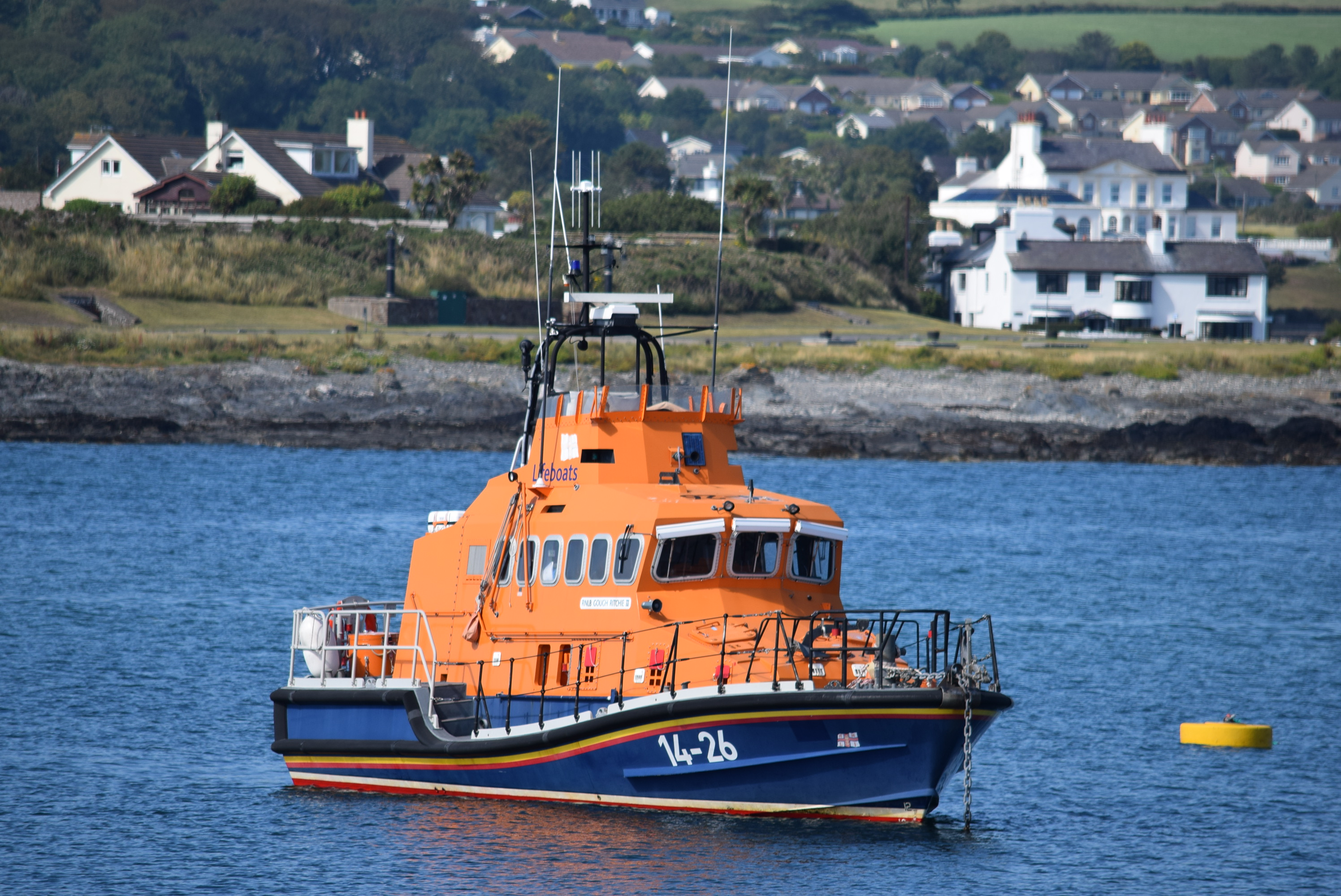
Trent-class lifeboat 14-26 Gough Ritchie (ON 1234) on her mooring

In the early hours of 6 November 2021, Port St Mary Lifeboat was alerted to a yacht requiring assistance, with tangled propellers, and dangerously close to the shore. Both the All-weather and Inshore lifeboats were launched in challenging condition, with the Gough Ritchie II providing some weather protection to the Inshore boat.

Unable to get in close with the ALB, or tow the yacht away from danger, Helm Richard Leigh and his crew of the Inshore boat were able to reach the yacht, and recovered the three crew to the All-weather boat. For this service, Richard Leigh was awarded the RNLI Bronze Medal, the first medal for gallantry awarded to Port St Mary lifeboat station.

In spring 2025, relief Trent-class lifeboat 14-15 Henry Heys Duckworth (ON 1213) was placed on station, replacing 14-26 Gough Ritchie II (ON 1234).

== Station honours ==
The following are awards made at Port St Mary:

- RNLI Bronze Medal
  Richard Leigh, Helm – 2022
- 'The Thanks of the Institution inscribed on Vellum'
  Norman Quillin, Coxswain/Mechanic – 1981
  Eric Quillin, crew member – 1981
  William Halsall, crew member – 1981
- 'A Framed Letter of Thanks signed by the Chairman of the Institution'
  Michael Kneale, Second Coxswain – 2004
- Framed Letters of Appreciation signed by the Chief Executive
  Chris Hill, crew member – 2022
  Daniel Grace, crew member – 2022
  Mike Keggen, Coxswain – 2022
  Sarah Keggen, Lifeboat Operations Manager – 2022
- Framed Letters of Appreciation Signed by the Operations Director
  Gareth Watt, Mechanic – 2022
  Brian Kelly, crew member – 2022
  Mark Pendlebury, crew member – 2022
  Laura Cordner, crew member – 2022
  Robert Marshall, crew member – 2022
- Member, Order of the British Empire (MBE)
  James Michael Keggen, Coxswain – 2024NYH

== Port St Mary lifeboats ==
=== Pulling and Sailing (P&S) lifeboats ===
ON (Note: ON is the RNLI's Official Number of the boat.)	Name	Built	On station	Class	Comments
401	James Stevens No.1	1896	1896–1917	35-foot self-righting (P&S)	(Note: 35 ft 0 in (10.67 m) x 8 ft 6 in (2.59 m) (10-oared) self-righting (P&S) lifeboat, legacy of Mr J. Stevens of Birmingham, built by Thames Ironworks of Blackwall, London, costing £463.); Sold in 1917. Renamed Nordkapp Viking. Last reported damaged at Cobbs Quay, Poole, August 1979.
556	Marianne	1906	1917–1936	35-foot self-righting (P&S)	(Note: 35 ft 0 in (10.67 m) x 8 ft 6 in (2.59 m) (10-oared) self-righting (P&S) lifeboat, legacy of Col. J. A. Hay of Cheltenham, built by Thames Ironworks of Blackwall, London, costing £823 when new.); Previously at Newcastle. Sold in 1936. Renamed Courageous. Last reported at Donaghadee in 1936.

=== Motor lifeboats ===
ON	Op.No. (Note: Op. No. is the RNLI's Operational Number of the boat carried on the hull.)	Name	Built	On station	Class	Comments
785	–	Sir Heath Harrison	1936	1936–1949	35-foot 6in self-righting (motor)	
674	–	The Newbons	1922	1949–1950	40-foot self-righting (motor)	(Note: 40 ft 0 in (12.19 m) x 10 ft 6 in (3.20 m) self-righting (motor) lifeboat, legacy of Mr R. A. Newbon, with a single 45-hp 'Tylor' petrol engine, built by J. Samuel White of Cowes, costing £8,622 when new.); Previously at Sennen Cove. Sold in 1951. Renamed Fair Lady. Last reported at Birkenhead docks, June 1980.
753	–	Civil Service No.5	1932	1950–1956	45-foot 6in Watson	Previously at Donaghadee.
930	–	R. A. Colby Cubbin No.2	1956	1956–1976	46-foot 9in Watson	
1051	54-06	The Gough Ritchie	1976	1976–1998	54-foot Arun	
1234	14-26	Gough Ritchie II	1998	1998–2025	Trent	
1213	14-15	Henry Heys Duckworth	1996	2025–	Trent	Previously in the relief fleet.

More post-service details can be found on the respective lifeboat class pages.

=== Inshore lifeboats ===
Op.No.	Name	On station	Class	Comments
D-81	Unnamed	1966–1972	D-class (RFD PB16)	
D-209	Unnamed	1973	D-class (RFD PB16)	
D-203	Unnamed	1974	D-class (RFD PB16)	
D-209	Unnamed	1975–1976	D-class (RFD PB16)	
D-209	Unnamed	1977–1986	D-class (RFD PB16)	
D-323	Gus	1986–1994	D-class (EA16)	
D-462	Frances	1994–2002	D-class (EA16)	
D-575	Hounslow	2002–2010	D-class (EA16)	
D-742	Spirit of Leicester	2010–2023	D-class (IB1)	
D-873	Frank Martin	2023–	D-class (IB1)	

== See also ==
- List of RNLI stations
- List of former RNLI stations
- Royal National Lifeboat Institution lifeboats
