= Barry Dock Lifeboat Station =

RNLI lifeboat station in Vale of Glamorgan, Wales

- Gorsaf Bad Achub Dociau'r Barri

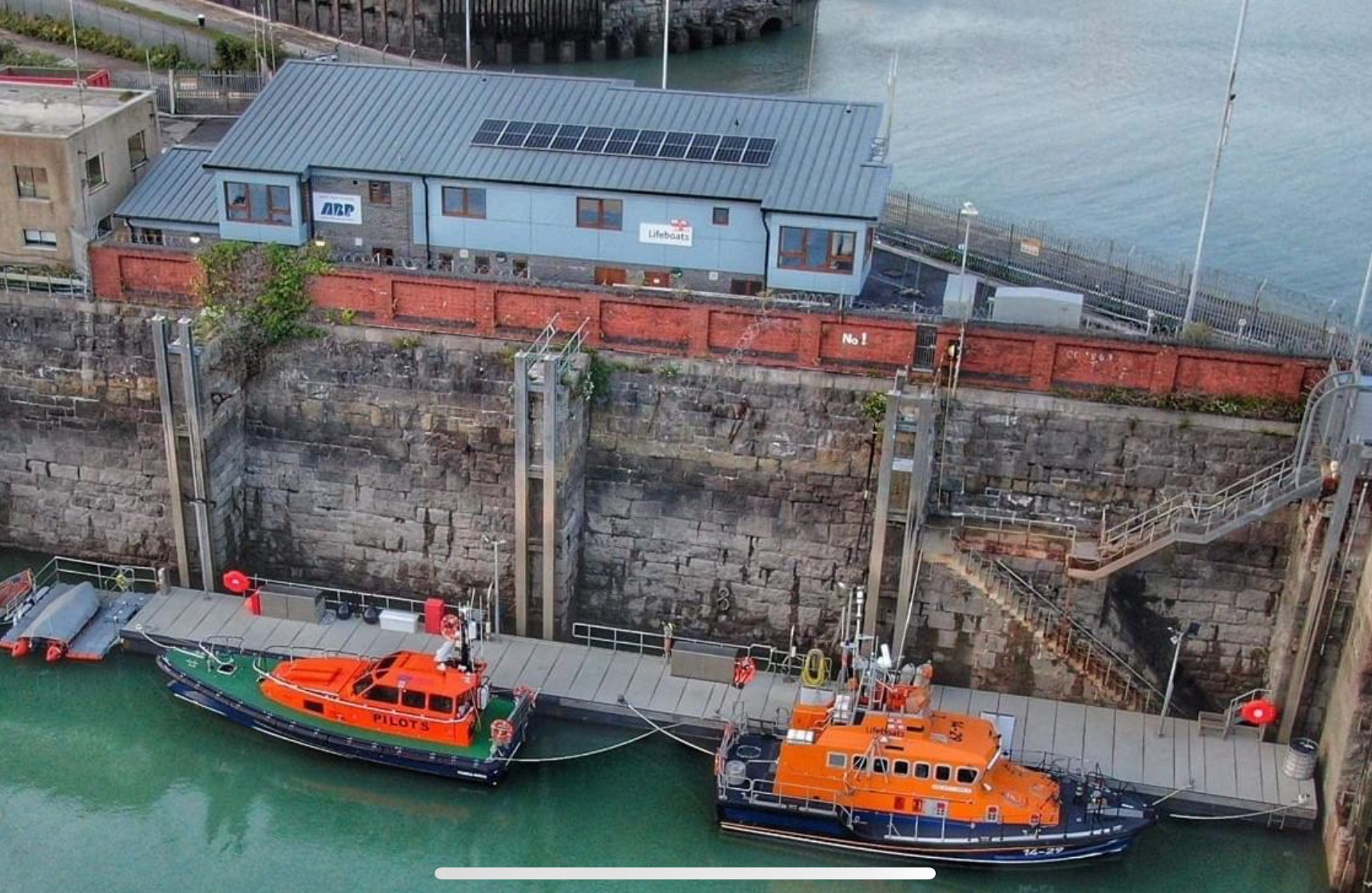
- Barry Dock Lifeboat Station

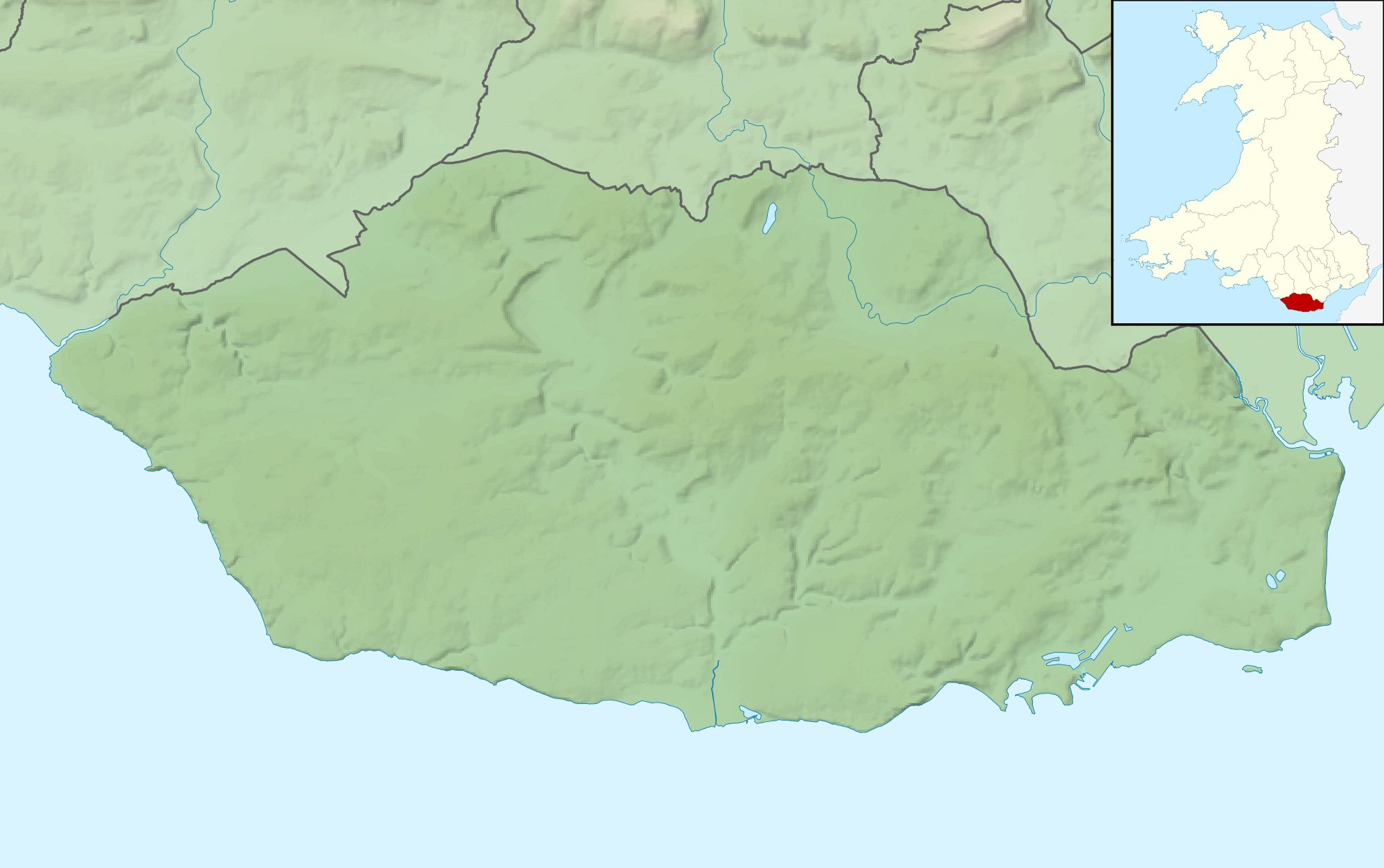
- Location within Vale of Glamorgan

General information
- Type: RNLI Lifeboat Station
- Location: The Pierhead Buildings, The Outer Harbour, Barry Dock, Vale of Glamorgan, Wales, CF62 5QS, UK
- Coordinates: 51°23′35.0″N 3°15′39.4″W
- Opened: 1901
- Owner: Royal National Lifeboat Institution

Website
- Barry Dock RNLI Lifeboat Station

Barry Dock Lifeboat Station (Welsh: Gorsaf Bad Achub Dociau'r Barri) is located at the Pierhead Buildings, at Barry Dock Outer Harbour, near the town of Barry, in the Vale of Glamorgan, Wales.

A lifeboat station was first opened at Barry Dock in 1901, by the Royal National Lifeboat Institution (RNLI).

The station currently operates a Shannon-class All-weather lifeboat, named 13-51 Richard and Caroline Colton II (ON 1358), on station since 2024, and a small D-class (IB1) Inshore lifeboat, Frances Mary Corscadden (D-820), on station since 2018. Both boats are moored at a floating pontoon, which can accommodate the tidal range encountered on the Bristol Channel.

== History ==
Barry Dock lifeboat station opened in 1901, The first lifeboat to be placed at Barry Dock was the John Wesley (ON 456), a 43-foot Watson-class non-self-righting 'pulling and sailing' (P&S) lifeboat, one with oars and sails, which cost £1,710. A new boathouse and slipway were constructed at a cost of £2,300.

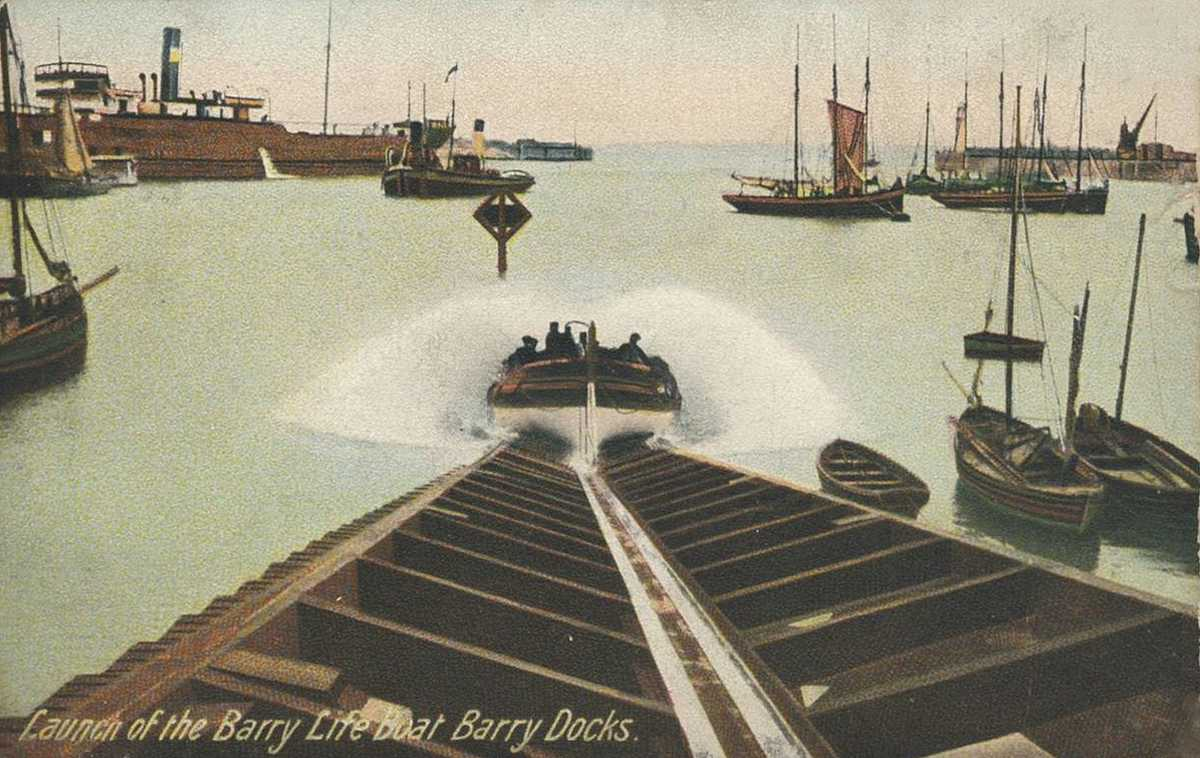
Barry Dock, Launch of the Lifeboat c.1906

In 1922, the station received its first motor lifeboat, Prince David (ON 677), a single engine 40-foot Watson-class non-self-righting lifeboat, which would still retain sails in case of engine failure. The boathouse was modified to accommodate the new boat prior to its arrival in 1920, at a cost of £1,400.

Barry Dock lifeboat Prince David, under the command of Acting Coxswain Archibald Claude Jones, Barry Dock Honorary Secretary, in the absence of the regular coxswain, was launched to the aid of the French schooner Goeland on 17 September 1935. The vessel was on passage from Roscoff to Swansea when she lost her sails in a strong gale, and was drifting off Rhoose Point. In dangerous conditions, the lifeboat rescued all six crew only shortly before the boat was wrecked on the rocks. Jones was awarded the RNLI Silver Medal, with the rest of the crew being awarded bronze medals.

In a NW gale on 6 December 1940, the Rachel and Mary Evans (ON 806) was launched to the aid of the steamship London, travelling to Cardiff from Penzance, and now dragging her anchor near Breaksea Lightship. The lifeboat returned to Barry to arrange a tug, and then attended the vessel for a second time, to get a line aboard. However, conditions were too rough for the tug to assist, and 10 men were rescued off the vessel. Coxswain David Lewis was awarded the RNLI Bronze Medal.

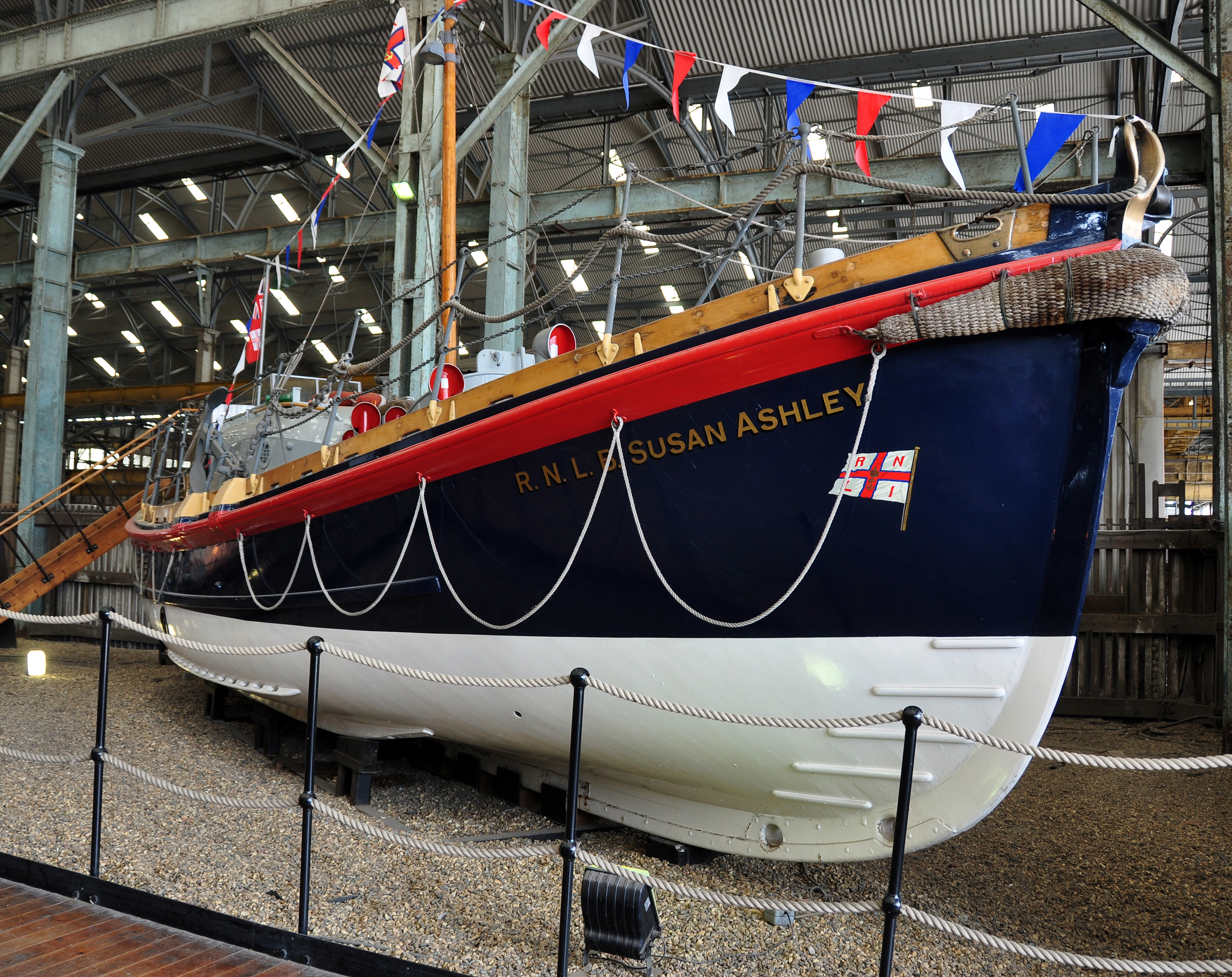
RNLB Susan Ashley at Chatham

In 1973, a second lifeboat was placed at Barry Dock, the Susan Ashley (ON 856), a 41-foot Watson-class lifeboat, which would serve alongside the Arun-class lifeboat 52-01 Arun (ON 1018) until 1979, when the boat was withdrawn, and the second station closed. The Susan Ashley now resides in the RNLI Heritage Collection at Chatham Historic Dockyard.

In 2002, at a meeting of the RNLI, it was decided that the decision to replace the current Arun-class with a Trent-class lifeboat would be rescinded, and that Barry Dock would receive a new FSB2 (Fast Slipway Boat), (subsequently named Tamar-class). In 2006, Barry Dock received a Trent-class lifeboat, 14-29 Inner Wheel II (ON 1245), which would remain on station for the next 18 years.

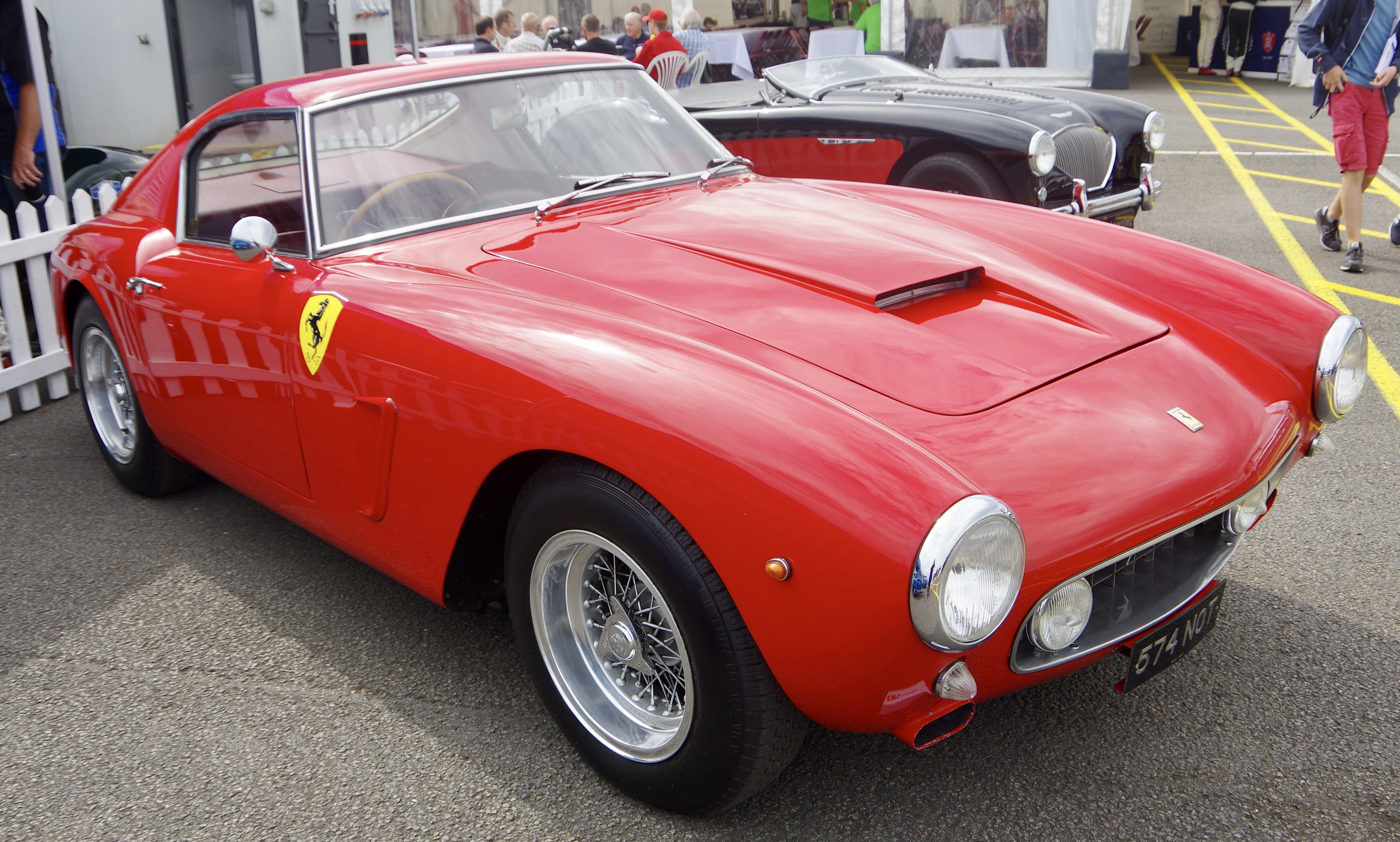
Ferrari 250 GT SWB 1995GT

In 2015, the RNLI received the most valuable items ever left to the Institution in a single legacy. In a most extraordinary bequest, the RNLI received two rare Ferrari cars from the estate of the late Richard Colton, businessman. Both were sent to auction:

- A silver 1967 Ferrari 275 GTB/4, sold for £1.93m
- A red 1960 Ferrari 250 GT SWB, sold for £6.6m

This donation has already helped fund the Shannon-class lifeboat now based at Hastings, and £2.8million was allocated to the construction of a new boathouse at Pwllheli. A second Shannon-class lifeboat was allocated to Barry Dock.

Construction works began in 2022, of a new building at the pierhead, to provide a purpose built station with modern crew facilities for the RNLI, along with living quarters and welfare area for the Associated British Ports Pilot’s, who are sharing the building. The station became operational on 12 September 2023, a long overdue replacement for the old wooden ex-show bungalow, donated to the RNLI for use as a crew room by Associated British Ports in 1991.

On 9 June 2024, Shannon-class All-weather lifeboat 13-51 Richard and Caroline Colton II (ON 1358) commenced service at Barry Dock, relieving the Trent-class lifeboat Inner Wheel.

== Station honours ==
The following are awards made at Barry Dock:

| Award date | Name | Award | Notes |
|---|---|---|---|
| 1907 | Daniel Rees, Solicitor | RNLI Gold Medal | For the rescue of three people from the yacht Firefly. |
| 1907 | Ivor Rees, Engineer | RNLI Silver Medal | For the rescue of three people from the yacht Firefly. |
| 1907 | D. Morgan Rees | Thanks of the Institution inscribed on Vellum | For the rescue of three people from the yacht Firefly. |
| 1907 | Harold M. Lloyd | Framed Letter of Thanks signed by the Chairman of the Institution | For the rescue of three people from the yacht Firefly. |
| 1914 | Daniel P. Davies, Pilot Apprentice | RNLI Silver Medal | For rescuing two men from the ketch Elizabeth Couch. |
| 1935 | Archibald Claude Jones, Honorary Secretary / Acting Coxswain | RNLI Silver Medal | For a dangerous service to rescue six crew from the schooner Goeland. |
| 1935 | Henry Hobbs, Second Coxswain | RNLI Bronze Medal | For a dangerous service to rescue six crew from the schooner Goeland. |
| 1935 | Hewitt Swarts, Mechanic | RNLI Bronze Medal | For a dangerous service to rescue six crew from the schooner Goeland. |
| 1935 | Stanley Alexander, Crew Member | RNLI Bronze Medal | For a dangerous service to rescue six crew from the schooner Goeland. |
| 1935 | Thomas Alexander, Crew Member | RNLI Bronze Medal | For a dangerous service to rescue six crew from the schooner Goeland. |
| 1935 | William Cook, Crew Member | RNLI Bronze Medal | For a dangerous service to rescue six crew from the schooner Goeland. |
| 1935 | Henry Housden, Crew Member | RNLI Bronze Medal | For a dangerous service to rescue six crew from the schooner Goeland. |
| 1935 | Frederick Searle, Crew Member | RNLI Bronze Medal | For a dangerous service to rescue six crew from the schooner Goeland. |
| 1941 | David Lewis, Coxswain | RNLI Silver Medal | For rescuing 10 people from the steamer South Coaster during a gale on 6 December 1940. |
| 2003 | Edward "Ted" George William Powell, Honorary Secretary | Member, Order of the British Empire (MBE) | Awarded an MBE in Her Majesty The Queen’s Birthday Honours. |

== Station fatalities ==
In memory of those lost whilst serving Barry Dock lifeboat:

- Died while working on the Watson-class lifeboat Rachel and Mary Evans, after he fell to the concrete floor of the boathouse, 13 January 1965.

Frederick Swarts, Coxswain (59)

== Barry Dock lifeboats ==
=== Pulling and Sailing (P&S) lifeboats ===
| ON (Note: ON is the RNLI's Official Number of the boat.) | Name | Built | On station | Class | Comments |
|---|---|---|---|---|---|
| 456 | John Wesley | 1901 | 1901–1922 | 43-foot Watson (P&S) | (Note: 43-foot Watson-class non-self-righting (P&S) lifeboat, funded by the John Wesley LB fund (Rev. Hargreaves), built by Thames Ironworks, costing £1,712.) |

=== Motor lifeboats ===
| ON | Op. No. (Note: Op. No. is the RNLI's Operational Number of the boat carried on the hull.) | Name | Built | On station | Class | Comments |
|---|---|---|---|---|---|---|
| 677 | – | Prince David | 1922 | 1922–1937 | 40-foot Watson | |
| 806 | – | Rachel and Mary Evans | 1937 | 1937–1968 | 41-foot Watson | |
| 1005 | 44-006 | Arthur and Blanche Harris | 1968 | 1968–1974 | Waveney | |
| 856 | – | Susan Ashley; (No.2 Station) | 1948 | 1973–1979 | 41-foot Watson | Now on display at the RNLI Heritage Collection, Chatham Historic Dockyard. |
| 1018 | 52-01 | Arun | 1971 | 1974–1997 | Arun | |
| 1082 | 52-23 | Margaret Frances Love | 1982 | 1997–2003 | Arun | Sold to China SAR, renamed Hua Ying 398 |
| 1135 | 52-39 | Mickie Salvesen | 1988 | 2003–2006 | Arun | Sold to Iceland SAR, numbered 2681, named Vörður II |
| 1228 | 14-24 | Dora Foster McDougall | 1997 | 2006 | Trent | |
| 1245 | 14-29 | Inner Wheel II | 2000 | 2006–2024 | Trent | |
| 1358 | 13-51 | Richard and Caroline Colton II | 2024 | 2024– | Shannon | |

=== Inshore lifeboats ===
| Op. No. | Name | On station | Class | Comments |
|---|---|---|---|---|
| D-638 | Richard John Talbot Hillier | 2014–2018 | D-class (IB1) | Boarding Boat/SAR |
| D-820 | Frances Mary Corscaden | 2018– | D-class (IB1) | |

== See also ==
- List of RNLI stations
- List of former RNLI stations
- Royal National Lifeboat Institution lifeboats
