= Trent-class lifeboat =

British and Irish rescue lifeboat class

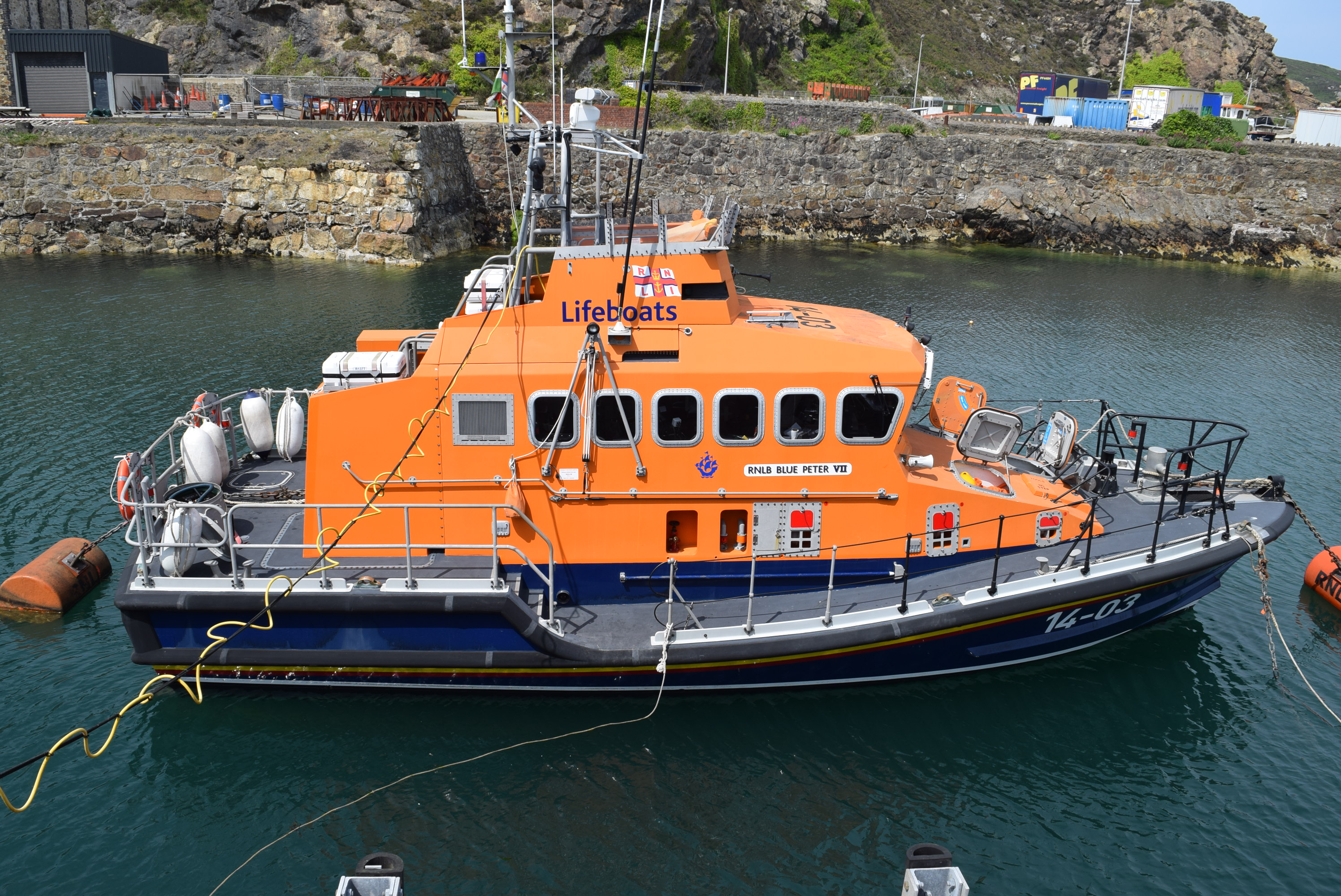
- RNLB 14-03 Blue Peter VII at Fishguard, May 2025

Class overview
- Builders: Green Marine, Littlehampton; William Osborne, Littlehampton; Souters Marine, Cowes; Halmatic, Porchester
- Operators: Royal National Lifeboat Institution; Sea-Watch.org, Lampedusa, Italy
- Preceded by: Arun, Tyne, Waveney
- Succeeded by: Shannon, B-class (Atlantic 85)
- Cost: £1 million – £1.58 million
- Built: 1990–2003
- In service: 1994–
- Completed: 38
- Active: 14 Active; 12 Relief
- Lost: 1
- Retired: 11

General characteristics
- Displacement: 27.5 long tons (28 t)
- Length: 14.30 m (46 ft 11 in)
- Beam: 4.90 m (16 ft 1 in)
- Draught: 1.45 m (4 ft 9 in)
- Propulsion: 2 × MAN D2840LE 401 diesel engines, 860 hp (641 kW) (ON 1245 is fitted with MAN D2840LE 403EDC engines 909-hp)
- Speed: 25 knots (29 mph; 46 km/h)
- Range: 250 nmi (460 km)
- Capacity: self-righting: 20; non-self-righting: 73
- Complement: 6

The Trent-class lifeboat is an All-weather lifeboat operated by the Royal National Lifeboat Institution (RNLI) from 15 stations (2026) around the coasts of Great Britain and Ireland to provide coverage up to 50 miles (80 km) out to sea. Introduced to service in 1994, the class is named after the River Trent, the second longest river wholly in England.

All of the following fleet details are referenced to the 2026 Lifeboat Enthusiasts' Society Handbook, with information retrieved directly from RNLI records.

== History ==
In the 1980s, the Arun and Waveney All-weather lifeboats provided coverage 30 miles (48 km) out to sea, operating at up to 18 knots (33 km/h) to cover the distance in two hours in good weather. However, the RNLI felt that they needed the capability to extend their coverage to 50 miles (80 km) radius which would require lifeboats with a top speed of 25 knots (46 km/h). This resulted in the 14 m (46 ft) Trent and 17 m (56 ft) Severn lifeboats.

The prototype for the Trent class was the 14-01 Earl and Countess Mountbatten of Burma (ON 1180), built in 1991. After being used for trials until 1994, she spent one year on service at Alderney Lifeboat Station until their permanent boat arrived, before joining the Relief fleet. Construction of the Trent-class fleet continued until 2003. Earl and Countess Mountbatten of Burma was withdrawn from service in 2019, and sold in 2021. She is now named Aurora, and operates as a rescue boat out of Lampedusa in the Mediterranean Sea.

The Trent will not receive a service life extension refurbishment, and are gradually being withdrawn, to be replaced mainly by Shannon-class lifeboats.

== Design ==
The Trent is intended to lie afloat at moorings. It has five water-tight bulkheads to create six compartments: fore peak; fore store; survivor cabin; tank space; machinery space; and aft peak steering compartment. Above these is the main deckhouse which has seats for the six crew and a doctor. This is another water-tight space which provides the boat's self-righting capability.

Designed and built by Green Marine, each boat is constructed of over 100 mm (3.9 in) thick fibre reinforced composite topsides, single laminate double hull bottoms, 4 water-tight bulkheads and prepreg epoxy, glass and Kevlar shields.

The Trent has a service life of 25 years, although current estimates appear to exceed these original operational confines due to constant on-station maintenance, periodic refitting and sporadic repairs. In comparison with its predecessors, the boat has numerous additional advantages which aid in the overall success of every launch. One detail would be its condensed hull, which allows it to operate in significantly constrained locations (such as marina berths and dense quayside scenes).

Another aspect aiding in its confined manoeuverability would be the bilge keels which aid in protecting its twin drive props. Its hull sheerline sweeps down into an area known as the 'welldeck', which helps ease the recovery of casualties onto the lifeboat. The remote location of an 'a-frame' hoist also provides additional assistance for particularly awkward recoveries (such as casualties in stretchers).

As of 2006, each Trent class lifeboat is complemented with an array of advanced technologies. Each device provides full assistance in search and rescue operations, and therefore must be of an officially high standard. The comprehensive electronics fit includes full radio equipment including Navtex Multi-Frequency, Marine Very High Frequency and DSC installations. For navigation the crew utilize an array of digital select systems including DGPS equipment, and an electronic Laserplot chart display and information system which allows complete automated management via the vessel's on-board processors (autohelm), although comparatively infrequent in practice.

Other features of Trent class lifeboats include VHF/DF, radar and weather sensors. Provisions for survivors include complete first aid equipment including the Basket and Neill Robertson stretchers, oxygen and Entonox breathing systems, ambulance pouch, thermodynamic food canisters and sick bags for ailing casualties. The Trents also have a small toilet arrangement. The afterdeck houses a salvage pump in a water-tight container for use in inter-vessel salvage, and two fire hoses allow proficient fire fighting. The Trent carries an inflatable XP-boat which is powered by a 5-hp outboard engine, and can be deployed in slight conditions to gain access to rocks or beaches when an inshore lifeboat is otherwise unavailable.

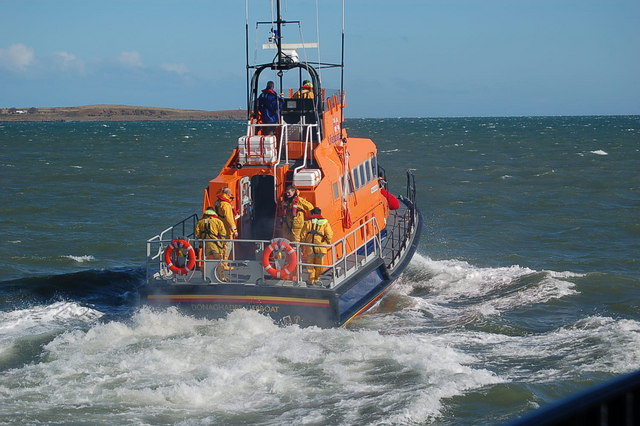
View from astern

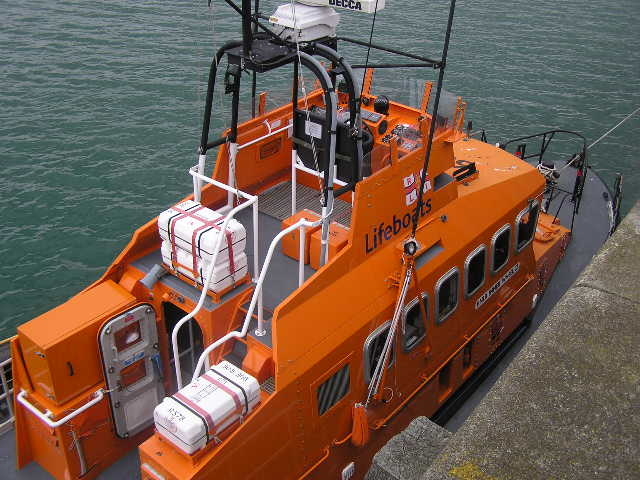
Flying bridge

== Trent-class lifeboat fleet ==
=== RNLI active fleet ===
ON (Note: ON is the RNLI's Official Number of the boat.)	Op. No. (Note: Op. No. is the RNLI's Operational Number of the boat carried on the hull.)	Name	Built	In service	Station	MMSI	Comments
1197	14-02	Esme Anderson	1994	1994–2023	Ramsgate	232001840	(Note: Legacy of Mrs E. G. Anderson, built by Green Marine / William Osborne, costing £1,025,000.)
1197	14-02	Esme Anderson	1994	2024–	Eastbourne	232001840	(Note: Legacy of Mrs E. G. Anderson, built by Green Marine / William Osborne, costing £1,025,000.)
1198	14-03	Blue Peter VII	1994	1994–	Fishguard	232001860	(Note: Funded by the BBC TV Blue Peter Appeal, built by Green Marine / Souters Marine, costing £1,025,000.)
1200	14-05	Anna Livia	1995	1995–	Dún Laoghaire	232001880	(Note: Funded by the Dublin Bay appeal, plus other gifts and legacies, built by Green Marine / William Osborne, costing £1,025,000.)
1213	14-15	Henry Heys Duckworth	1996	1996–2016	Relief fleet	232002380	(Note: Gift of Mrs L. Duckworth, built by Green Marine / William Osborne, costing £1,200,000.); Assigned to Port St Mary, replacing (ON 1234), March 2025.
1213	14-15	Henry Heys Duckworth	1996	2016–2019	Red Bay	232002380	Assigned to Port St Mary, replacing (ON 1234), March 2025.
1213	14-15	Henry Heys Duckworth	1996	2019–2023	Relief fleet	232002380	Assigned to Port St Mary, replacing (ON 1234), March 2025.
1213	14-15	Henry Heys Duckworth	1996	2023–2024	Eastbourne	232002380	Assigned to Port St Mary, replacing (ON 1234), March 2025.
1213	14-15	Henry Heys Duckworth	1996	2024–2025	Relief fleet	232002380	Assigned to Port St Mary, replacing (ON 1234), March 2025.
1213	14-15	Henry Heys Duckworth	1996	2025–	Port St Mary	232002380	Assigned to Port St Mary, replacing (ON 1234), March 2025.
1223	14-19	Ger Tigchelaar	1996	1997–2025	Arklow	232002182	(Note: Legacy of Mr Frits Oppenheim, built by Green Marine / William Osborne, costing £1,200,000.); Assigned to Holyhead, replacing (ON 1205), February 2026.
1223	14-19	Ger Tigchelaar	1996	2025–2026	Relief fleet	232002182	Assigned to Holyhead, replacing (ON 1205), February 2026.
1223	14-19	Ger Tigchelaar	1996	2026–	Holyhead	232002182	Assigned to Holyhead, replacing (ON 1205), February 2026.
1224	14-20	Roy Barker II	1997	1997–	Wick	232002183	(Note: Legacy of Mr F. R. Barker, built by Green Marine / Souters Marine, costing £1,580,000.)
1225	14-21	MacQuarie	1997	1997–2004	Sunderland	232002582	(Note: Legacies of Lt. Cmdr. H. MacQuarie-Stone, MBE, RD, and Mrs Mary Noond, built by Green Marine / William Osborne, costing £1,250,000.); Assigned to Donaghadee, replacing (ON 1267), August 2023.
1225	14-21	MacQuarie	1997	2004–2023	Relief fleet	232002582	Assigned to Donaghadee, replacing (ON 1267), August 2023.
1225	14-21	MacQuarie	1997	2023–	Donaghadee	232002582	Assigned to Donaghadee, replacing (ON 1267), August 2023.
1233	14-25	Austin Lidbury	1998	1998–	Ballycotton	232003131	(Note: Legacy of Mrs Mary Lidbury, built by Green Marine / William Osborne, costing £1,200,000.)
1240	14-28	Sam and Ada Moody	1999	1999–	Achill Island	232003138	(Note: Bequest of Ada Moody, built by Green Marine / William Osborne, costing £1,200,000.)
1245	14-29	Inner Wheel II	2000	2000–2006	Relief fleet	232004396	(Note: Funded by the Inner Wheel appeal 1997–2000, plus various other legacies, built by Green Marine / Souters Marine, costing £1,200,000.); Assigned to Alderney, replacing (ON 1199), September 2024.
1245	14-29	Inner Wheel II	2000	2006–2024	Barry Dock	232004396	Assigned to Alderney, replacing (ON 1199), September 2024.
1245	14-29	Inner Wheel II	2000	2024–	Alderney	232004396	Assigned to Alderney, replacing (ON 1199), September 2024.
1252	14-31	Elizabeth of Glamis	2001	2001–	Broughty Ferry	232004404	(Note: Legacies of Mr I. C. Low, Mr R. Bonar, Mrs M. Maynard and Mrs B. Thomson, built by Green Marine / Souters Marine, costing £1,400,000.)
1253	14-32	Corinne Whiteley	2001	2001–2019	Relief fleet	232004405	(Note: Legacy of Mrs C. Whiteley, built by Green Marine / Souters Marine, costing £1,400,000.)
1253	14-32	Corinne Whiteley	2001	2019–	Red Bay	232004405	(Note: Legacy of Mrs C. Whiteley, built by Green Marine / Souters Marine, costing £1,400,000.)
1258	14-33	Roy Barker III	2001	2002–	Howth	235003642	(Note: Legacy of Mr F. R. Barker, built by Green Marine / Souters Marine, costing £1,400,000.)
1266	14-35	John Neville Taylor	2002	2002–2008	Relief fleet	235005114	(Note: Legacy of Mr J. N. Taylor, built by Green Marine / Souters Marine, costing £1,400,000.)
1266	14-35	John Neville Taylor	2002	2008–	Dunbar	235005114	(Note: Legacy of Mr J. N. Taylor, built by Green Marine / Souters Marine, costing £1,400,000.)

=== RNLI relief fleet ===
ON	Op. No.	Name	Built	In service	Station	MMSI	Comments
1204	14-06	Windsor Runner (Civil Service No.42)	1995	1995–2004	Blyth	232001950	(Note: Gift of CISPOTEL LB fund, built by Green Marine / Halmatic, costing £1,025,000.)
1204	14-06	Windsor Runner (Civil Service No.42)	1995	2004–2008	Relief fleet	232001950	(Note: Gift of CISPOTEL LB fund, built by Green Marine / Halmatic, costing £1,025,000.)
1204	14-06	Windsor Runner (Civil Service No.42)	1995	2008	Dunbar	232001950	(Note: Gift of CISPOTEL LB fund, built by Green Marine / Halmatic, costing £1,025,000.)
1204	14-06	Windsor Runner (Civil Service No.42)	1995	2008–	Relief fleet	232001950	(Note: Gift of CISPOTEL LB fund, built by Green Marine / Halmatic, costing £1,025,000.)
1205	14-07	Frederick Storey Cockburn	1995	1995–2023	Courtmacsherry Harbour	232001960	(Note: Legacy of Mr S. F. Cockburn, built by Green Marine / William Osborne, costing £1,025,000.)
1205	14-07	Frederick Storey Cockburn	1995	2023–2024	Relief fleet	232001960	(Note: Legacy of Mr S. F. Cockburn, built by Green Marine / William Osborne, costing £1,025,000.)
1205	14-07	Frederick Storey Cockburn	1995	2024–2026	Holyhead	232001960	(Note: Legacy of Mr S. F. Cockburn, built by Green Marine / William Osborne, costing £1,025,000.)
1205	14-07	Frederick Storey Cockburn	1995	2026–	Relief fleet	232001960	(Note: Legacy of Mr S. F. Cockburn, built by Green Marine / William Osborne, costing £1,025,000.)
1206	14-08	Douglas Aikman Smith	1995	1996–2021	Invergordon	232001970	(Note: Legacy of Mr D. Aikman-Smith, built by Green Marine / Souters Marine, costing £1,025,000.)
1206	14-08	Douglas Aikman Smith	1995	2021–	Relief fleet	232001970	(Note: Legacy of Mr D. Aikman-Smith, built by Green Marine / Souters Marine, costing £1,025,000.)
1208	14-10	Samarbeta	1995	1996–	Great Yarmouth and Gorleston	232002340	(Note: Gift of Volvo Cars UK Ltd, plus other gifts and legacies, built by Green Marine / Souters Marine, costing £1,025,000.); Withdrawn from Gt Yarmouth and Gorleston, 13 June 2026.
1208	14-10	Samarbeta	1995	2026	Relief fleet	232002340	Withdrawn from Gt Yarmouth and Gorleston, 13 June 2026.
1212	14-14	George and Mary Webb	1995	1996–2023	Whitby	232002370	(Note: Funded by the 'Mary Webb Trust', built by Green Marine / Souters Marine, costing £1,200,000.)
1212	14-14	George and Mary Webb	1995	2023–	Relief/Training fleet	232002370	(Note: Funded by the 'Mary Webb Trust', built by Green Marine / Souters Marine, costing £1,200,000.)
1214	14-16	Stanley Watson Barker	1996	1996–2026	Portree	232002390	(Note: Legacy of Mr S. W. Barker, plus legacies from Mrs E. Arabian and Mr J. R. Blaxland, built by Green Marine / Souters Marine, costing £1,175,000.); Withdrawn from Portree on 1 June 2026
1214	14-16	Stanley Watson Barker	1996	2026–	Relief fleet	232002390	Withdrawn from Portree on 1 June 2026
1215	14-17	Elizabeth and Ronald	1996	1996–2021	Dunmore East	232002410	(Note: Legacy of Mrs E. M. Manners-Clark, built by Green Marine / William Osborne, costing £1,200,000.)
1215	14-17	Elizabeth and Ronald	1996	2021–	Relief fleet	232002410	(Note: Legacy of Mrs E. M. Manners-Clark, built by Green Marine / William Osborne, costing £1,200,000.)
1222	14-18	Maurice and Joyce Hardy	1996	1996–2025	Fowey	232002181	(Note: Gift and bequest of Mr M. G. Hardy, CBE, C.Eng, built by Green Marine / Souters Marine, costing £1,250,000.); Withdrawn from Fowey, August 2025
1222	14-18	Maurice and Joyce Hardy	1996	2025–	Relief fleet	232002181	Withdrawn from Fowey, August 2025
1239	14-27	Robert Hywel Jones Williams	1999	1999–2026	Fenit	232003137	(Note: Legacy of Mr R. H. Jones-Williams, built by Green Marine / William Osborne, costing £1,200,000.); Withdrawn from Fenit, 15 September 2026.
1239	14-27	Robert Hywel Jones Williams	1999	2026–	Relief fleet	232003137	Withdrawn from Fenit, 15 September 2026.
1246	14-30	Dr John McSparran	2000	2000–2026	Larne	232004397	(Note: Legacies of Miss M. McSparran, Mrs A. F. M. Cripps, and Miss S. C. McCully, built by Green Marine / Souters Marine, costing £1,400,000.); Withdrawn from Larne, 1 April 2026.
1246	14-30	Dr John McSparran	2000	2026–	Relief fleet	232004397	Withdrawn from Larne, 1 April 2026.
1259	14-34	Willie & May Gall	2002	2002–2026	Fraserburgh	235005113	(Note: Legacy of Mrs M. C. Gall, built by Green Marine / Souters Marine, costing £1,400,000.); Withdrawn from Fraserburgh, 30 May 2026.
1259	14-34	Willie & May Gall	2002	2026–	Relief fleet	235005113	Withdrawn from Fraserburgh, 30 May 2026.
1274	14-37	Betty Huntbatch	2003	2003–2004	Relief fleet	235010879	(Note: Legacy of Mrs E. Huntbatch, built by Green Marine / Souters Marine, costing £1,400,000.)
1274	14-37	Betty Huntbatch	2003	2004–2025	Hartlepool	235010879	(Note: Legacy of Mrs E. Huntbatch, built by Green Marine / Souters Marine, costing £1,400,000.)
1274	14-37	Betty Huntbatch	2003	2025–	Relief fleet	235010879	(Note: Legacy of Mrs E. Huntbatch, built by Green Marine / Souters Marine, costing £1,400,000.)

=== RNLI retired fleet ===
ON	Op. No.	Name	Built	In service	Former Station	MMSI	Comments
1180	14-01	Earl and Countess Mountbatten of Burma	1991	1992–1994	Trials	211883350	(Note: Funded by a national appeal by the Romsey branch of the RNLI, built by Green Marine / William Osborne, costing £1,000,000.); Sold 2021. Renamed Aurora. In Service with Sea-Watch.org, Lampedusa, Italy. See below:–
1180	14-01	Earl and Countess Mountbatten of Burma	1991	1994–1995	Alderney	211883350	Sold 2021. Renamed Aurora. In Service with Sea-Watch.org, Lampedusa, Italy. See below:–
1180	14-01	Earl and Countess Mountbatten of Burma	1991	1995–2014	Relief fleet	211883350	Sold 2021. Renamed Aurora. In Service with Sea-Watch.org, Lampedusa, Italy. See below:–
1180	14-01	Earl and Countess Mountbatten of Burma	1991	2014–2019	Training fleet	211883350	Sold 2021. Renamed Aurora. In Service with Sea-Watch.org, Lampedusa, Italy. See below:–
1199	14-04	Roy Barker I	1994	1995–2024	Alderney	232001870	(Note: Legacy of Mr F. R. Barker, built by Green Marine / William Osborne, costing £1,025,000.); Sold 2026. Workboat operated by GNH Marine Services based at Harwich.
1199	14-04	Roy Barker I	1994	2024–2026	Relief fleet	232001870	Sold 2026. Workboat operated by GNH Marine Services based at Harwich.
1207	14-09	Sir Ronald Pechell Bt.	1995	1995–2008	Dunbar	–	(Note: Legacy of Dora, Lady Petchell, funds from the Dunbar LB appeal, plus other gifts and legacies, built by Green Marine / William Osborne, costing £1,410,000.); Damaged beyond repair, March 2008
1209	14-11	Barclaycard Crusader	1995	1996–2019	Eyemouth	232002350	(Note: Gift of 'Barclaycard Profiles', plus other gifts and legacies, built by Green Marine / William Osborne, costing £1,097,000.); Sold 2022. Renamed GNH Crusader. Workboat operated by GNH Marine Services based at Harwich, December 2025.
1209	14-11	Barclaycard Crusader	1995	2019–2021	Relief fleet	232002350	Sold 2022. Renamed GNH Crusader. Workboat operated by GNH Marine Services based at Harwich, December 2025.
1210	14-12	Forward Birmingham	1995	1996–2008	Exmouth	232002360	(Note: Funded by the 'Forward Birmingham' LB appeal, plus other gifts and legacies, built by Green Marine / Souters Marine, costing £1,025,000.); Sold 2024. Broken for donor parts.
1210	14-12	Forward Birmingham	1995	2008–2024	Relief fleet	232002360	Sold 2024. Broken for donor parts.
1211	14-13	George and Ivy Swanson	1995	1996–2021	Sheerness	232002180	(Note: Legacy of Mrs I. Swanson, plus other gifts and legacies, built by Green Marine / William Osborne, costing £1,200,000.); Sold 2024. Renamed Steadfast, operating from Lochboisdale, December 2025.
1211	14-13	George and Ivy Swanson	1995	2021–2024	Training fleet	232002180	Sold 2024. Renamed Steadfast, operating from Lochboisdale, December 2025.
1226	14-22	Edward Duke of Windsor	1997	1997–2025	Relief fleet	232002583	(Note: Bequest of the late Duchess of Windsor, plus other legacies, built by Green Marine / Souters Marine, costing £1,580,000.); Sold 2025. Workboat operated by GNH Marine Services based at Harwich, December 2025.
1227	14-23	Mora Edith MacDonald	1997	1997–2024	Oban	232002584	(Note: Legacy of Mrs M. E. MacDonald, plus the bequest of The Duke of Atholl, plus other gifts and legacies, built by Green Marine / William Osborne, costing £1,200,000.); Sold in 2026. Renamed Anne Wesley with Wesley Offshore, September 2026.
1227	14-23	Mora Edith MacDonald	1997	2024–2026	Relief fleet	232002584	Sold in 2026. Renamed Anne Wesley with Wesley Offshore, September 2026.
1228	14-24	Dora Foster McDougall	1997	1997–2006	Relief fleet	232002585	(Note: Legacy of Mrs D. Foster-McDougall, built by Green Marine / Souters Marine, costing £1,580,000.); Sold 2025. Renamed Aurora SAR 2, in Service with Sea-Watch.Org, Lampedusa, Italy. See below:–
1228	14-24	Dora Foster McDougall	1997	2006	Barry Dock	232002585	Sold 2025. Renamed Aurora SAR 2, in Service with Sea-Watch.Org, Lampedusa, Italy. See below:–
1228	14-24	Dora Foster McDougall	1997	2006–2022	Relief fleet	232002585	Sold 2025. Renamed Aurora SAR 2, in Service with Sea-Watch.Org, Lampedusa, Italy. See below:–
1234	14-26	Gough Ritchie II	1998	1998–2025	Port St Mary	232003132	(Note: Gift of 'The Gough-Ritchie Trust', plus legacy of Miss M. Webb, built by Green Marine / William Osborne, costing £1,200,000.); Sold Feb 2026.
1267	14-36	Saxon	2003	2003–2023	Donaghadee	235007808	(Note: Legacy of Mrs F. B. Rivers, built by Green Marine / Souters Marine, costing £1,400,000.); Sold 2025. Renamed C. Hernon, at Galway, December 2025.
1275	14-38	Jim Moffat	2003	2004–2025	Troon	235010881	(Note: Gift of 'The Moffat Charitable Trust', the 'Lifeboats for the Clyde' appeal, plus other gifts and legacies, built by Green Marine / Souters Marine, costing £1,400,000.); 2026, For Sale

== Other lifeboat fleets ==
Sea-Watch.org is a SAR organisation, based out of Lampedusa, Italy, and effecting rescues in the Mediterranean Sea.

RNLI ON	Name	Built	In service	Station	AIS	Comments
1180	Aurora SAR	1991	2021–	Lampedusa	211883350	
1228	Aurora SAR 2	1997	2025–	Lampedusa	232039073	

== See also ==
- Royal National Lifeboat Institution lifeboats
