= RNLB William and Kate Johnstone =

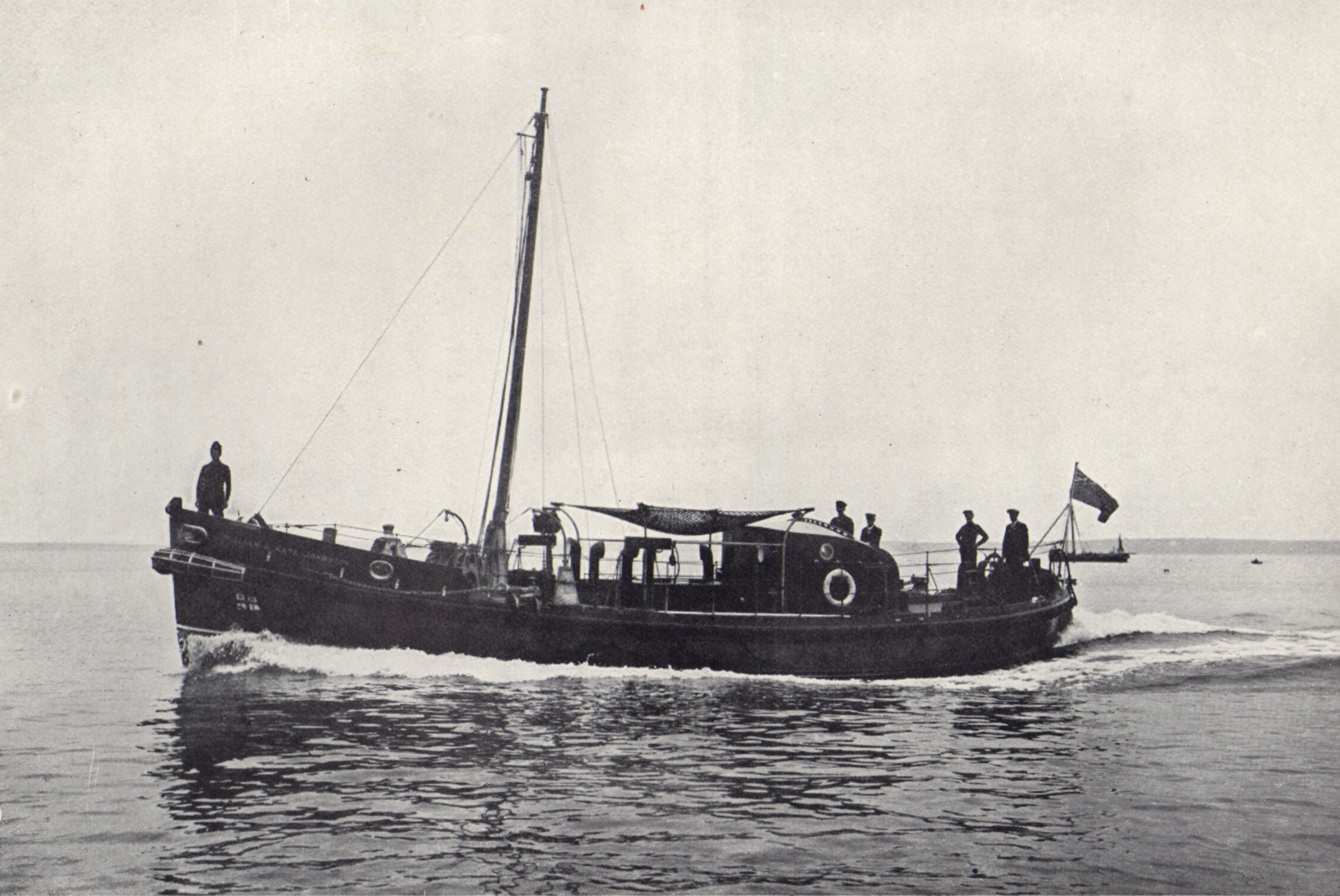
- RNLB William and Kate Johnstone

History

United Kingdom
- Owner: Royal National Lifeboat Institution (RNLI)
- Builder: J Samuel White & Co, Cowes, Isle of Wight
- Official Number: ON 682 (RNLI)
- Donor: gifts from Mr. Stewart and his sister Mrs. W. Kendall
- Station: New Brighton
- Cost: £16,084
- Yard number: 1586
- Launched: 13 August 1923
- Christened: By Mrs. Stewart Johnston, 24 September 1924
- Acquired: 1923
- Decommissioned: 1950
- Status: In seagoing condition at Gosport

General characteristics
- Class & type: Barnett
- Type: Motor Lifeboat
- Displacement: 43 tons 2cwt
- Length: 59 ft 9 in (18.21 m) overall
- Beam: 14 ft 9 in (4.50 m)
- Installed power: Two D.E. Six-cylinder, 80 hp submersible petrol engins
- Propulsion: 2 X pitch propellers in tunnels
- Speed: 9.5 kn (17.6 km/h)
- Range: 300 nmi (560 km)

RNLB William and Kate Johnston (ON 682) is a Barnett-class lifeboat that was stationed at New Brighton in the English county of Cheshire from the summer of 1923 until 1950. The lifeboat was designed as a prototype by James R. Barnett who was a consulting naval architect to the Royal National Lifeboat Institution. She was the first Barnett-class lifeboat and at the time of her launch, she was the largest lifeboat in the world.

== Design and construction ==
Th Barnett-class motor lifeboat, designed by naval architect James R. Barnett, consulting naval architect to the Royal National Lifeboat Institution (RNLI), was a radical departure from their previous motor rescue boats, typically of around 45 feet (14 m). She was not self-righting as priority was given to an ability to reach port with a larger number of the rescued and to speed, even when awash. She was 60 feet (18 m) long with a beam of close to 15 feet (4.6 m) and a draught of 4 feet 6 inches (1.37 m). The hull was constructed of timber and was divided into fifteen watertight compartments. The lifeboat was also the first motor lifeboat to be built with flush decks, similar to earlier steam driven lifeboats. There was a semi-enclosed deck shelter which housed the on-deck helm position and which helped to keep the crew out of bad weather. Below deck there was also a cabin which could accommodate up to twenty four people; if necessary, the Barnett-class lifeboat was capable of carrying a total of 130 rescued people.

The William and Kate Johnston was driven by twin propellers which were housed in tunnels and powered by two DE5-type six-cylinder submersible petrol engines of 80 horsepower, also designed by Barnett. Each engine, with a separate fuel and cooling system, was housed in its own watertight chamber, and was capable of running even if the engine room became flooded and the engine was entirely submerged. The engines' air intakes were set well above the waterline even when the boat was waterlogged. The Barnett-class could cruise at 9.5 knots (17.6 km/h) and had an operating range of 300 nautical miles (560 km). The Barnett-class boats were also the first for the RNLI to rely solely on their engines for motive power, although they were equipped with a small staysail and trysail for stability purposes.
