= Killybegs Lifeboat Station =

Former lifeboat station in County Donegal, Ireland

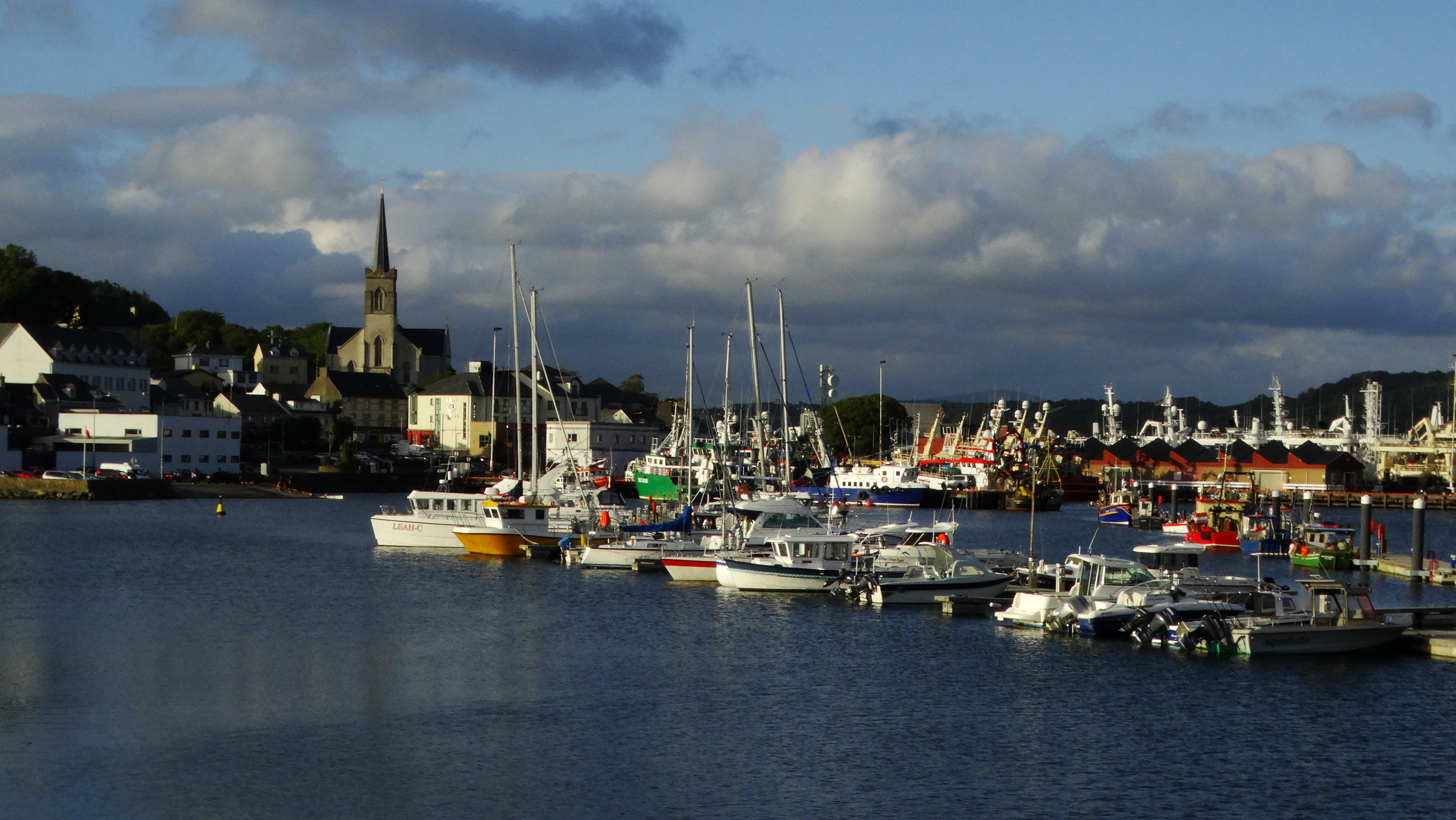
- Killybegs Harbour

- Killybegs, County Donegal

General information
- Status: Closed
- Location: Killybegs, County Donegal, Ireland
- Coordinates: 54°38′00″N 8°26′30″W
- Opened: 1941
- Closed: 1945

Killybegs Lifeboat Station was located in Killybegs, a town on the northern bank of the Stragar River estuary, on the southern coast of County Donegal, and the largest fishing port in Ireland.

A lifeboat was first stationed at Killybegs by the Royal National Lifeboat Institution (RNLI) in 1941, as one of 40 Auxiliary Lifeboat Stations created during World War II .

Operating for just 4 years, Killibegs Lifeboat Station closed in 1945.

== History ==
In 1941, the Institution received a request from the Air Ministry, to place more lifeboat stations on the west coast of Ireland. This was primarily to be available for the rescue of aircrew, forced down by combat, breakdown or bad weather during World War II.

Due to the neutrality of the Republic of Ireland in WWII, rescue launches could not be stationed along the Irish coast by the Royal Air Force (RAF), but as the independently operated RNLI was still active in Ireland, it was acceptable for them to create new stations.

When the Channel Islands fell to the control of the German Reich in June 1940, both the St Peter Port relief lifeboat Alfred and Clara Heath (ON 672), and the St Helier lifeboat, Howard D (ON 797), were taken under the control of the Germans. However, at the time, the regular St Peter Port lifeboat was away from the islands, undergoing maintenance in a boatyard in England.

In response to the request from the Air Ministry, the St Peter Port lifeboat, Queen Victoria (ON 719), a 51-foot Barnett-class lifeboat, with twin 60-hp engines, was deployed to a new Auxiliary Lifeboat Station at Killybegs, in County Donegal.

13 further Auxiliary Lifeboat Stations would be established on the Irish coast. However, with no other proper lifeboats available, the Institution equipped motor fishing boats, and paid a retaining fee to the respective Masters and crew. As with normal lifeboat men at the time, rewards were made for all launches to the aid of ships or aircraft in distress.

- Ballinskelligs, County Kerry.
- Blacksod, County Mayo.
- Castletownbere, County Cork
- Courtown, County Wexford
- Dingle, County Kerry
- Downings, County Donegal
- Gola Island, County Donegal
- Inishbofin, County Galway
- Malin Head, County Donegal
- Meenlaragh, County Donegal
- Teelin, County Donegal
- Tory Island, County Donegal
- Valentia, County Kerry

Many calls were made of the Killybegs Lifeboat during WWII, but the majority ended with nothing found, or the suspected casualty turning up safe.

On 9 February 1945, the military lookout at Mullaghmore reported a crashed aircraft at 16:45. The aircraft proved to be Handley Page Halifax MZ980, of No. 298 Squadron RAF, from RAF Tarrant Rushton in Dorset. In a south-west gale and rough seas, the Killybegs lifeboat launched at 17:15, arriving on scene at 18:50. Two crewmen, F/Lt John Carr (Air Bomber) and Sgt John Alan McKaine (Flight Engineer) had been lost, but four extremely cold airmen, including the badly injured pilot, were rescued from a life-raft. A search for the two missing men was made, but when a rescue ship arrived, the lifeboat returned to station with the four men, arriving back at Killybegs at 20:45.

In a sad turn of fate, all four airmen who survived the crash, F/O Delmer Ronald McGillivray (Pilot), F/Sgt James Beedham Walker (Navigator), F/O George Dixon (Wireless Operator/Air Gunner) and W/O James Ewart Bunn (Air Gunner), would lose their lives, when their Halifax aircraft was shot down just over six weeks later on 24th March 1945, during Operation Varsity.

The majority of Auxiliary Lifeboat Stations closed immediately after the war, although Valentia remained until November 1946, by which time, the RNLI had established Valentia Lifeboat Station as a permanent station.

Killybegs Lifeboat Station closed in 1945, and RNLB Queen Victoria (ON 719) returned to service at St Peter Port in the same year.

== Killibegs lifeboat ==
| ON (Note: ON is the RNLI's Official Number of the boat.) | Name | Built | On Station | Class | Comments |
|---|---|---|---|---|---|
| 719 | Queen Victoria | 1929 | 1941–1945 | 51-foot Barnett | (Note: 51-foot Barnett-class lifeboat, built by J. Samuel White of Cowes) |

== See also ==
- List of RNLI stations
- List of former RNLI stations
- Royal National Lifeboat Institution lifeboats
