= Stornoway Lifeboat Station =

RNLI lifeboat station in Outer Hebrides, Scotland

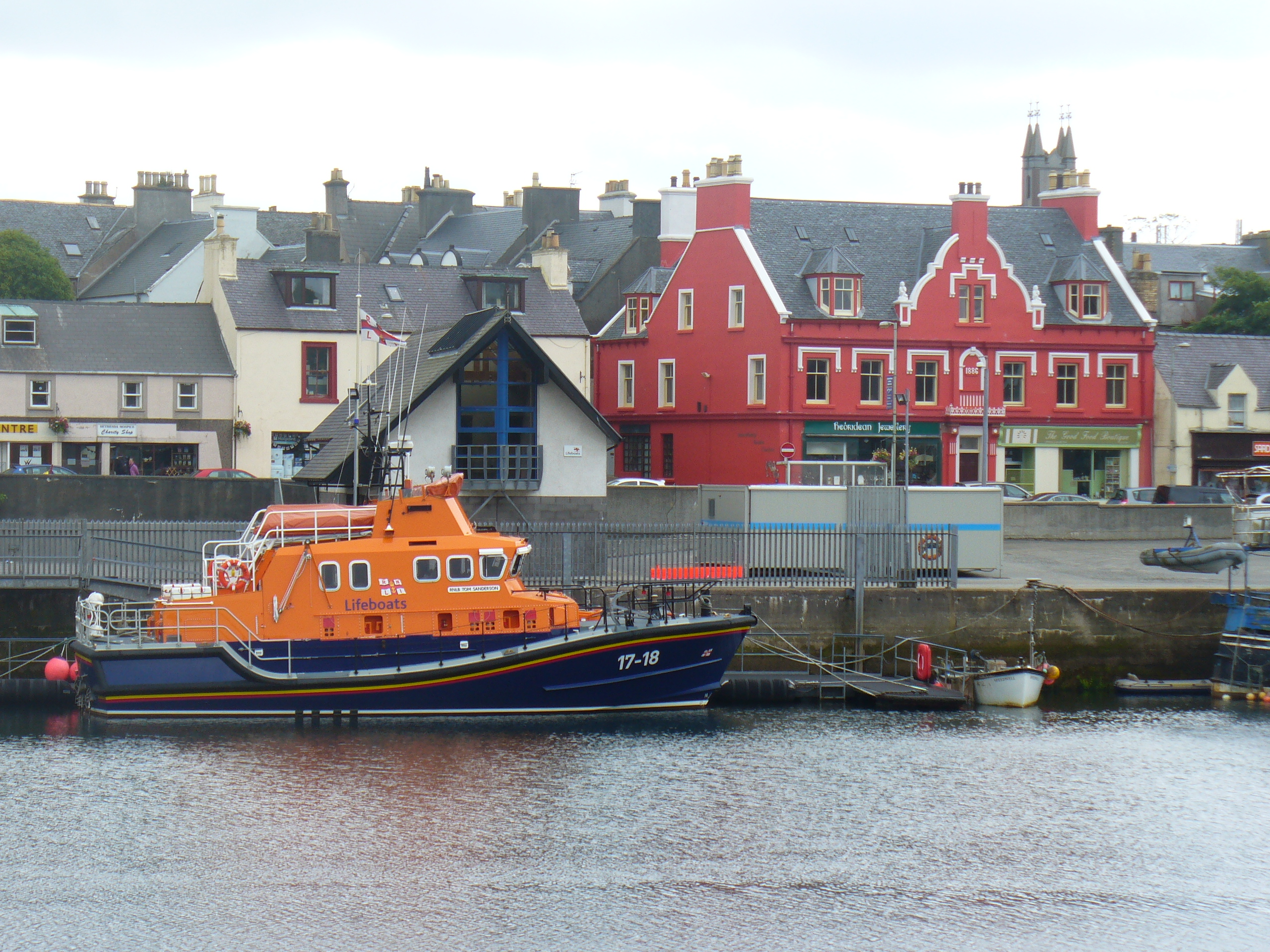
- Stornoway Lifeboat Station

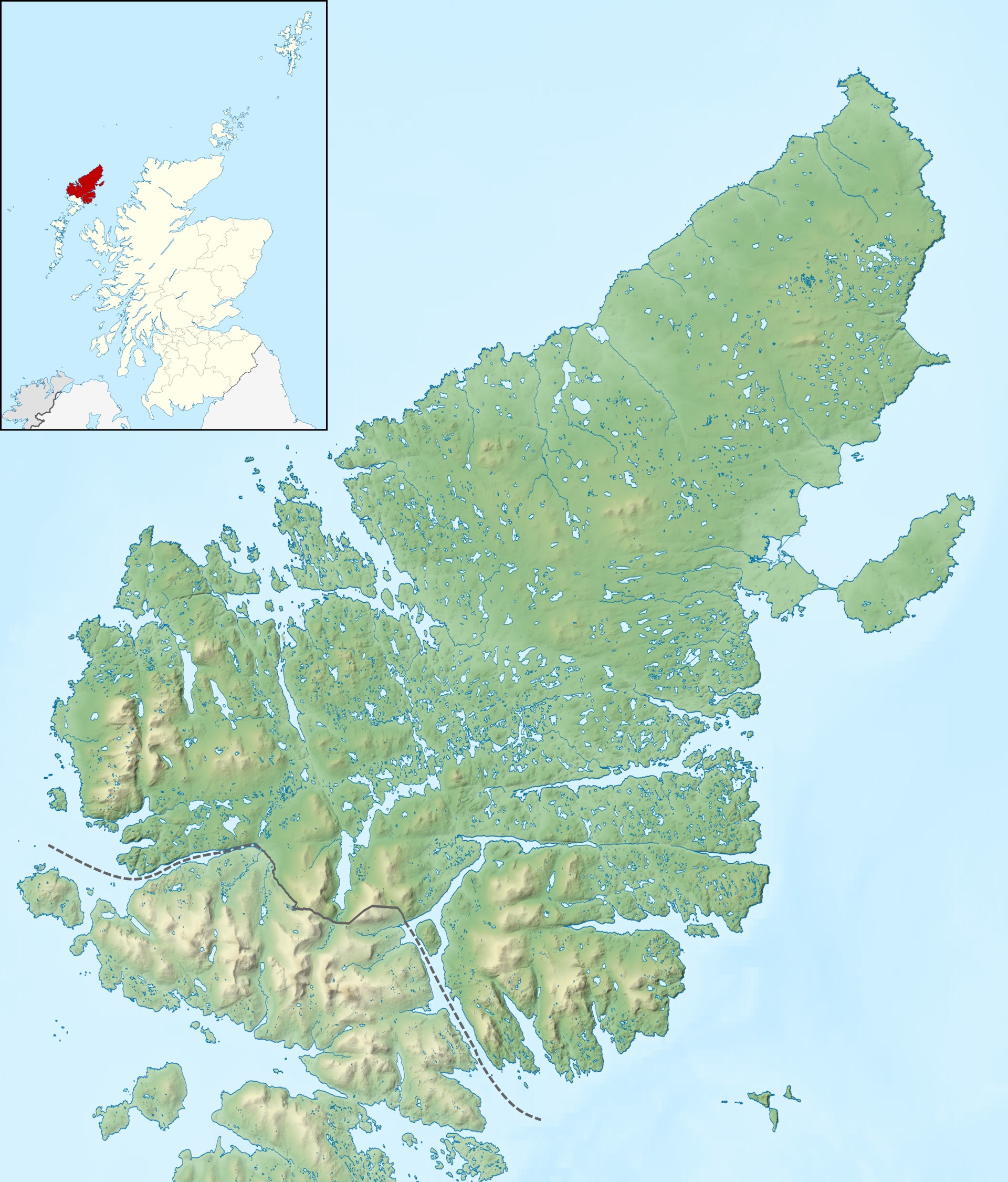
- Location within Lewis Location within Outer Hebrides

General information
- Type: RNLI Lifeboat Station
- Location: The Lifeboat House, Cromwell Street Quay, Stornoway, Isle of Lewis, HS1 2DF, Scotland
- Coordinates: 58°12′36.3″N 6°23′20.6″W
- Opened: 1887
- Owner: Royal National Lifeboat Institution

Website
- Stornoway RNLI Lifeboat Station

Stornoway Lifeboat Station is located at Stornoway, a harbour town on the east coast of the Isle of Lewis, part of the Outer Hebrides, an archipelago sitting off the north-west coast of Scotland.

A lifeboat was first placed at Stornoway by the Royal National Lifeboat Institution (RNLI) in 1887.

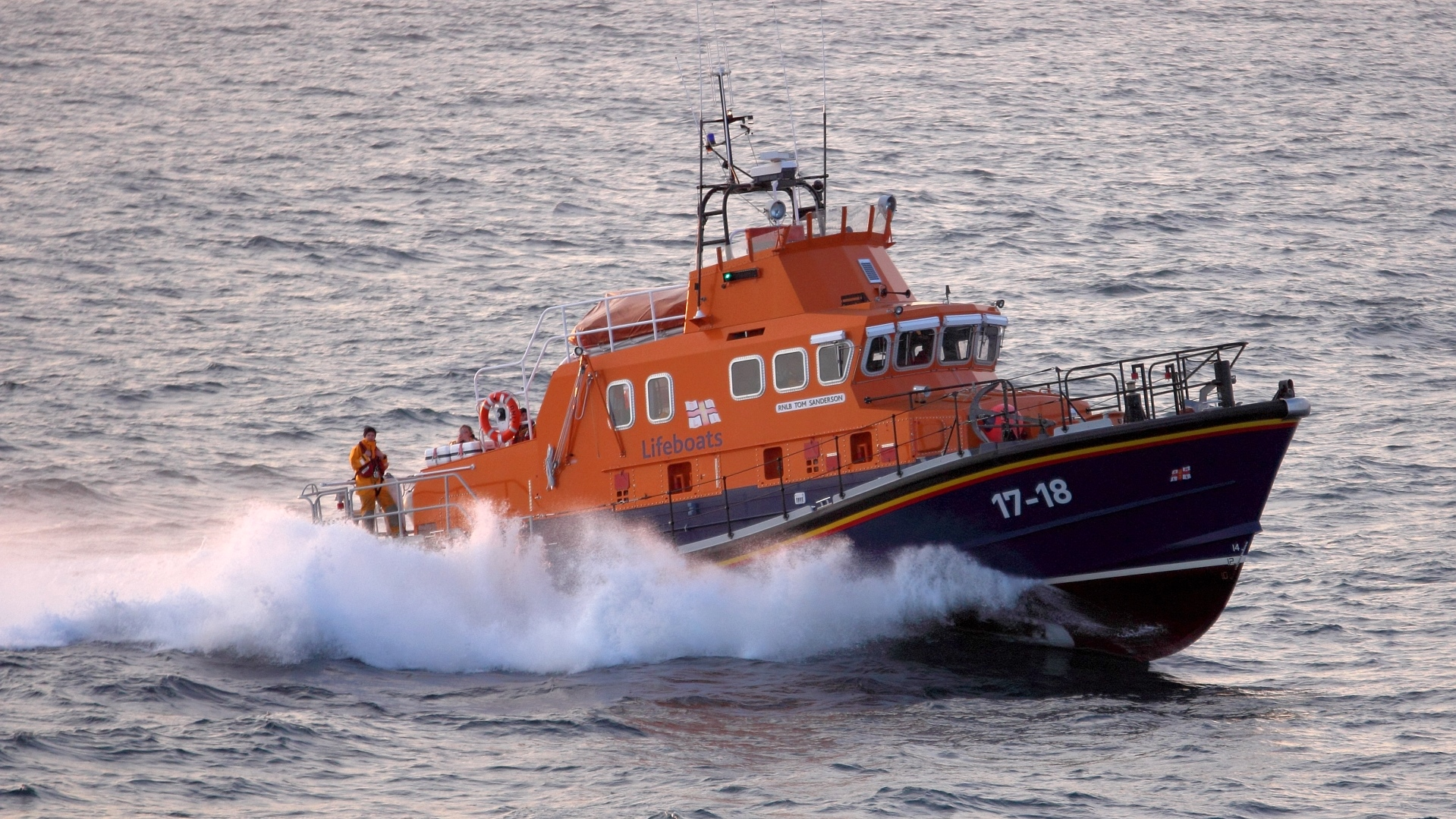
Stornoway Severn-class ALB 17-18 Tom Sanderson (ON 1238)

The station currently operates a Severn-class All-weather lifeboat, 17-18 Tom Sanderson (ON 1238), on station since 1999.

== History ==
After reviewing the report by the Chief Inspector of Lifeboats, following his visit to the Isle of Lewis, at a meeting of the RNLI committee of management on Thursday 4 November 1886, it was decided to establish a lifeboat station at Stornoway.

Although the nature of the Coast generally is quite unsuited for Life-boat work, it being rocky, with cliffs averaging from 60 to 100 feet high, it is different at Stornoway, which is a port of considerable trade, besides being frequented as a harbour of shelter in bad weather. In addition a large number of fishing-boats prosecute the herring fishery there during the season. It has therefore been considered prudent to guard against future casualties by establishing a Life-boat at the port.

— The Life-boat, vol. XIII, issue 146, 1 November 1887

There were no issues finding sufficient local support and crew members. A lifeboat house was built on Shell Street, at the bottom of Lifeboat Road (now Ferry Road), on land provided by Lady Matheson, and a 140-foot-long (43 m) concrete slipway was constructed to the waters edge. The total cost of construction was £1000. The site of the lifeboat house is now occupied by an electrical wholesaler.

The first lifeboat was a 34 ft (10 m) self-righting 'Pulling and Sailing' (P&S) lifeboat, one with sails and (10) oars. A gift of £1,000 received from Mrs Duguid of Kensington Gore was appropriated to the station, and in accordance with the donor's wishes, the lifeboat was named Isabella (ON 120). Isabella would be the first of four P&S boats stationed at Stornoway until 1929.

In 1929, Stornoway would receive their first motor-powered lifeboat. The boat was a 51-foot Barnett-class lifeboat, with twin 60-hp engines, delivering a top speed of 9 knots (17 km/h; 10 mph). It was also the first RNLI lifeboat equipped with a radio-telephone. The 100W unit had a range of approximately 50 miles (80 km). Provided from the legacy of Mrs Harriot Richardson of Greenwich, at a ceremony on 9 September 1929, the lifeboat was named William and Harriot (ON 718).

William and Harriot was launched to the aid of the Swedish motor-vessel Hervor Bratt of Gothenburg om 29 January 1949, which had run aground on Trodday Island, Skye. 20 men were brought ashore. The Hervor Bratt would later receive assistance from the Campbeltown lifeboat City of Glasgow (ON 720) after her tow line broke during recovery. The Royal National Lifeboat Institution was later awarded the Plaque of Merit and a Diploma, by the Swedish Lifeboat Society.

A new lifeboat arrived in Stornoway in 1955. The James and Margaret Boyd (ON 913), a 52-foot Barnett-class (Mk.I) lifeboat, costing £36,500, was named at a ceremony on 5 July 1955, by H.R.H. Princess Marina, Duchess of Kent, president of the Institution. It was reported that the helicopter transporting her belongings was the first to visit the Isles of Lewis.

On 30 January 1962, the James and Margaret Boyd was called out to the motor fishing vessel Maime, which had broken down in gale-force conditions leaving Stornoway harbour, and drifted on to the rocks at Battery Point. Arriving on scene at 20:35, the Bowman was injured by a flare, and he was returned immediately to the harbour, the lifeboat getting back to the Maime at 21:00. In rain and sleet showers, a line was finally passed to the vessel, with instructions to climb over the rocks, attached to the line. One man made the attempt, but not fastened to the line, he was washed away and drowned. Not wanting to suffer the same fate, the two remaining survivors refused to leave that way. A rubber dinghy was then borrowed from the nearby HMS Malcolm, and with both the Coxswain and John MacDonald veering down, the two survivors were pulled from the Maime. The rescue had taken over seven hours. Mechanic John MacLeod and Assistant Mechanic John MacDonald were each awarded the RNLI Bronze Medal. Coxswain Malcolm MacDonald was awarded the RNLI Silver Medal.

In the early hours of 29 September 1980, the Stornoway Solent-class lifeboat, 48-015 Hugh William Viscount Gough (ON 1020), was launched into a southerly gale to the aid of the fishing boat Junella, aground on rocks north of Skye. The lifeboat arrived after 3 hours, and skillfully avoiding the surrounding rocks, the lifeboat was held alongside the vessel for 40 minutes, allowing all 29 men to leave the Junella. Coxswain Malcolm MacDonald, as his uncle before, was awarded the RNLI Silver Medal.

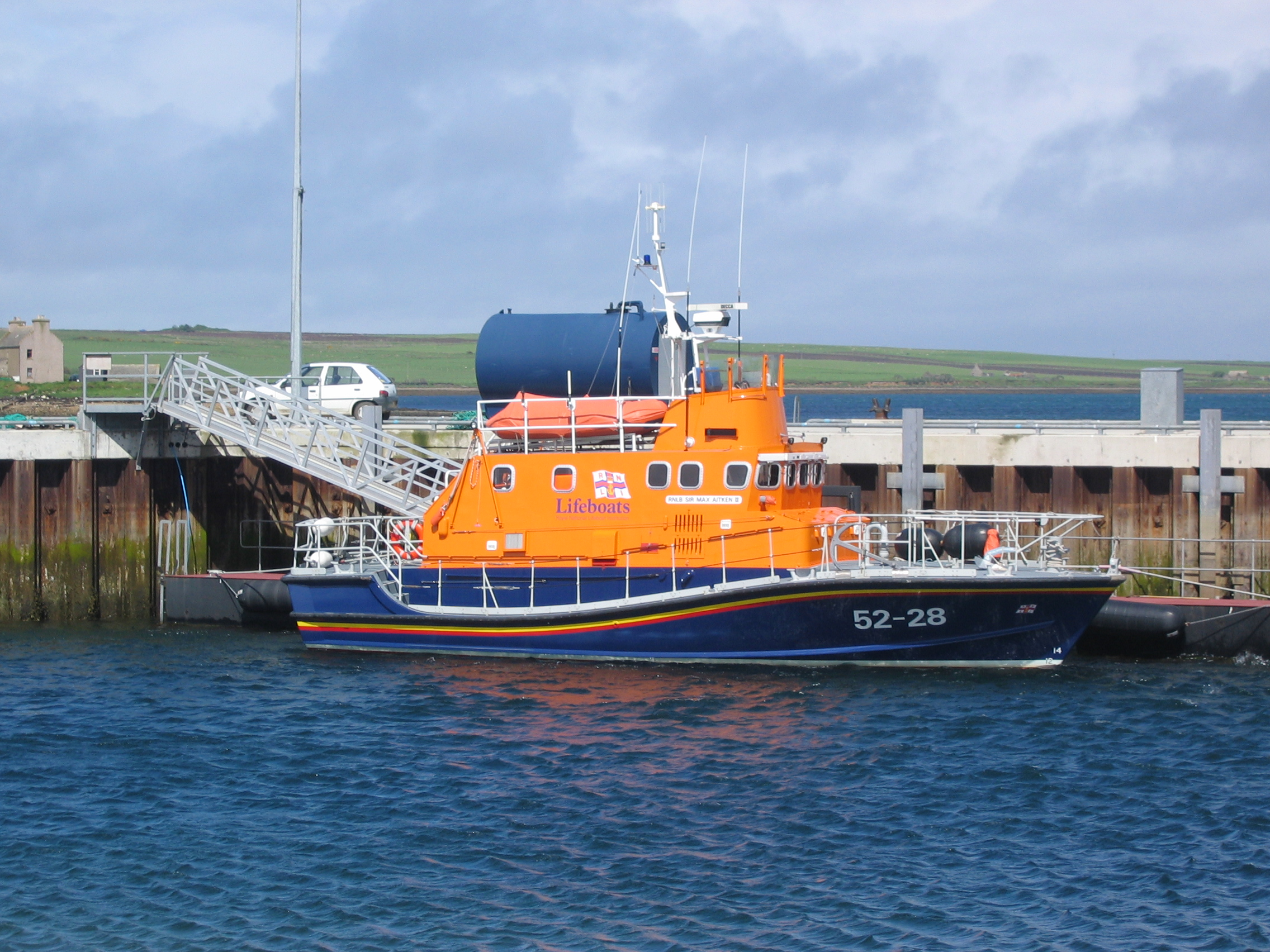
Stornoway Arun-class ALB 52-28 Sir Max Aitken II (ON 1098)

Princess Alexandra was invited to name the new Stornoway lifeboat in 1984, as had her mother some 30 years previously. However, she didn't have quite so far to travel this time, as the boat was named at The Prospect, West Cowes, on the Isle of Wight. This was the home of Sir William Maxwell Aitken, 1st Baron Beaverbrook, chairman of the Beaverbrook Foundation, which had funded a second lifeboat. On the 23 February 1984, the new 52 ft (16 m) Arun-class lifeboat was named 52-28 Max Aitken II (ON 1098).

In 1999, the Max Aitken II was withdrawn to the Relief fleet, later serving at Longhope, before being sold to China in 2005 as an operational lifeboat, named Hua Ying 385.

On 3 February 1999, Stornoway would receive a Severn-class lifeboat 17-18 Tom Sanderson (ON 1238). Stornoway's lifeboat is notable as the only Severn-class boat that doesn't have a crane.

== Station honours ==
The following are awards made at Stornoway.

- RNLI Silver Medal
  Malcolm (Calla) MacDonald, Coxswain – 1962
  Malcolm (Calum) MacDonald, Coxswain/Mechanic – 1981
- RNLI Bronze Medal
  Malcolm (Calla) MacDonald, Coxswain – 1952
  John MacLeod, Mechanic – 1962
  John MacDonald, Assistant Mechanic – 1962
  Malcolm (Calum) MacDonald, Coxswain/Mechanic – 1989
- 'The Thanks of the Institution inscribed on Vellum'
  Each of the crew of the Stornoway lifeboat – 1980
  Malcolm (Calum) MacDonald, Coxswain/Mechanic – 1993
- 'A Collective Framed Letter of Thanks signed by the Chairman of the Institution'
  Malcolm (Calum) MacDonald, Coxswain/Mechanic – 1993
  Donald MacLeod, Second Coxswain – 1993
  Robert Hughson, Assistant Mechanic – 1993
  John MacLennan, crew member – 1993
  Murdo Campbell, crew member – 1993
  John MacDonald, crew member – 1993
  Angus MacIver, crew member – 1993
- Plaque of Merit and a Diploma, awarded by the Swedish Lifeboat Society
  Royal National Lifeboat Institution – 1949
- Freedom of the Burgh of Stornoway
  Malcolm (Calla) MacDonald, former Coxswain – 1973
- 'A Framed Letter of Thanks, signed by the Chair of the RNLI Council'
  David Mackinnon, Coxswain – 2020
- 'Letters of Thanks, signed by the RNLI Chief Executive'
  Martin Murray, Mechanic – 2020
  John MacLeod, crew member – 2020
  Ross Hall, crew member – 2020
  Gavin Maciver, crew member – 2020
  Norman Matheson, crew member – 2020
  Ruaraidh Ferguson, crew member – 2020
- British Empire Medal
  Malcolm (Calla) MacDonald, former Coxswain – 1969QBH
- Member, Order of the British Empire (MBE)
  Dr. Alistair Brian Michie, Stornoway Rescue Helicopter Crew and Lifeboat Medical Adviser – 2005QBH
  John Jamieson MacLennan, Chair, Lifeboat Management Group – 2022QBH

== Stornoway lifeboats ==
=== Pulling and Sailing (P&S) lifeboats ===
ON (Note: ON is the RNLI's Official Number of the boat.)	Name	Built	On station	Class	Comments
120	Isabella	1887	1887−1901	34-foot self-righting (P&S)	(Note: 34 ft 0 in (10.36 m) x 7 ft 6 in (2.29 m) (10-oared) self-righting (P&S) lifeboat, gift of Mrs Duguid of Kensington, built by Woolfe of Shadwell, London, costing £372.); Sold in 1901.
473	Sarah Pilkington	1901	1901−1918	35-foot self-righting (P&S)	(Note: 35 ft 0 in (10.67 m) x 8 ft 6 in (2.59 m) (10-oared) self-righting (P&S) lifeboat, the anonymous gift of 'T.E.W', built by Thames Ironworks of Blackwall, London, costing £880.); Transferred to the Relief fleet. Later at Watchet.
559	Janet	1906	1918−1924	35-foot self-righting (P&S)	(Note: 35 ft 0 in (10.67 m) x 8 ft 6 in (2.59 m) (10-oared) self-righting (P&S) lifeboat, gift of Col. J. A. Hay of Cheltenham, built with a special shallow draft by Thames Ironworks of Blackwall, London, costing £810.); Previously at Port Eynon. Sold in March 1925.
639	James Marsh	1914	1924−1929	35-foot self-righting (P&S)	(Note: 35 ft 0 in (10.67 m) x 8 ft 6 in (2.59 m) (10-oared) self-righting (P&S) lifeboat, legacy of Miss C. Marsh of Aberdeen, built by Thames Ironworks of Blackwall, London, completed by S. E. Saunders of Cowes, costing £1,338.); Previously at Johnshaven. Sold in 1937.

=== All-weather lifeboats ===
ON	Op.No. (Note: Op.No. is the RNLI's Operational Number of the boat carried on the hull.)	Name	Built	On station	Class	Comments
718	–	William and Harriot	1929	1929−1954	51-foot Barnett	
913	–	James and Margaret Boyd	1954	1954−1973	52-foot Barnett (Mk.I)	Transferred to Macduff
1020	48-015	Hugh William Viscount Gough	1973	1973−1984	Solent	Transferred to Barra Island.
1098	52-28	Sir Max Aitken II	1984	1984−1999	Arun	Transferred to the Relief fleet. Later at Longhope.
1238	17-18	Tom Sanderson	1998	1999−	Severn	

More post-service details can be found on the respective lifeboat class pages.

== See also ==
- List of RNLI stations
- List of former RNLI stations
- Royal National Lifeboat Institution lifeboats
