= Barra Island Lifeboat Station =

RNLI Lifeboat station in the Outer Hebrides, Scotland

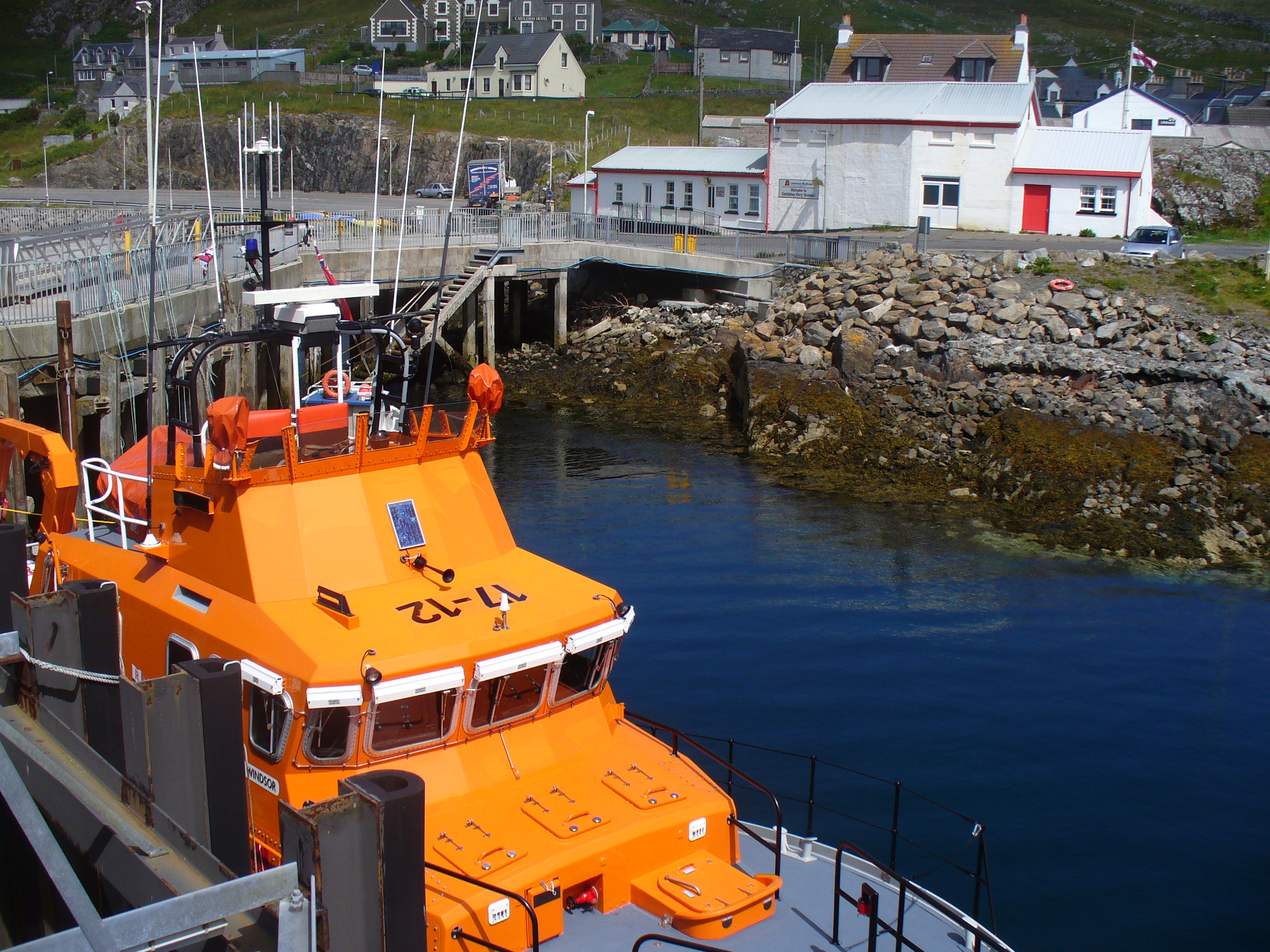
- Barra Island Lifeboat Station

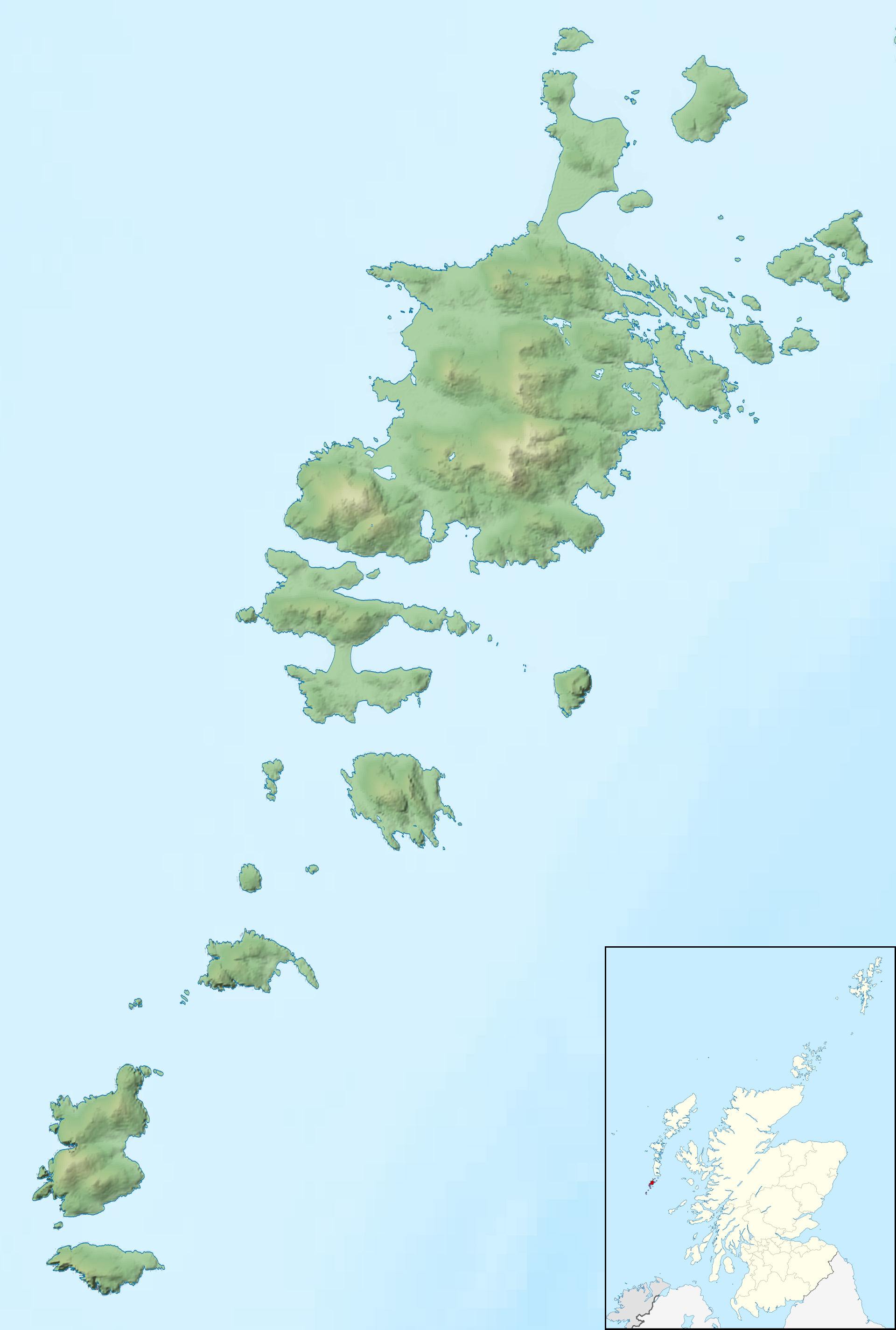
- Location within Barra Location within Outer Hebrides

General information
- Type: RNLI Lifeboat Station
- Location: Main Street, Castlebay, Barra, Outer Hebrides, HS9 5XD, Scotland
- Coordinates: 56°57′14.9″N 7°29′13.7″W
- Opened: September 1931
- Owner: Royal National Lifeboat Institution

Website
- Barra Island RNLI Lifeboat Station

Barra Island Lifeboat Station is located at Castlebay, a village at the southern end of the Isle of Barra, part of the Outer Hebrides, an archipelago sitting off the north-west coast of Scotland.

A lifeboat was first placed at Barra Island by the Royal National Lifeboat Institution (RNLI) in September 1931.

The station currently operates a Severn-class All-weather lifeboat, 17-12 Edna Windsor (ON 1230), on station since 1998.

== History ==
For many years, the only lifeboat serving the Outer Hebrides was the boat based at the Stornoway station, established in 1887. Following an increasing number of wrecks and loss of life in the area, at a meeting of the RNLI management committee on 16 July 1931, it was agreed for a one year trial period, that a new station be established at the opposite end of the archipelago, at Castlebay, to be known as Barra Island Lifeboat Station.

The decision to station a Life-boat in the Southern Hebrides was taken owing to the increasing number of wrecks in that area, where the prevailing winds are approximately W.S.W. Although perhaps not the ideal position, Barra Island has been chosen as best fulfilling the important condition that a Station should be as much to windward as possible.

— The Life-boat, vol. XXVIII, issue 307, page 328, October 1931

An eight-year-old 45-foot Watson-class lifeboat, was assigned to the new station at Castlebay. She was fitted with a single 80-hp Weyburn DE6 6-cylinder petrol engine, delivering a top speed of 8.25 knots (15.28 km/h; 9.49 mph), and a radius of action of 49 miles (79 km). The lifeboat had previously served at Tenby, launching 16 times, and saving 32 lives. The lifeboat had been named John R. Webb (ON 684) at Tenby, but the name was retained for their new lifeboat. Barra's new lifeboat would be renamed 684 RM (ON 684).

After being reconditioned, and fitted with "Wireless telegraphy", the lifeboat departed the RNLI depot at Poplar on 3 September 1931, travelling up the east coast to Leith, and onward via the Forth and Clyde Canal to Greenock. From there, the lifeboat traversed the Crinan Canal to Oban, before arriving at Castlebay on Barra Island on 11 September 1931. It was agreed that if conditions were found to be satisfactory, with regard to both the station and to communications, the station would be made permanent, and provided with a 51-foot Barnett (Stromness-class) Cabin Life-boat, with twin 60-hp engines.

On 31 March 1932, the lifeboat mechanic at Barra Island witnessed the steam trawler Eamont, of Fleetwood, hit a submerged rock as she headed to Castlebay. The lifeboat 684 RM was launched, and took off one of the crew who was injured. She then stood by as the vessel was refloated.

51-foot Barnett (Stromness-class) lifeboat Lloyd's (ON 754), awaiting restoration in 2010

With conditions duly met, a new boat was ready for Barra Island in 1932. This would be a 51-foot Barnett (Stromness-class) lifeboat, costing £9,443, and capable of 184 miles at top speed. It was decided to name the boat Lloyd's (ON 754) in recognition of the longstanding support of Lloyd's of London to the RNLI. In 1802, on the proposal of its Chairman, John Julius Angerstein, £2,000 had been provided and 26 lifeboats built, and there were 39 on station when the Institution was founded as the Royal National Institution for the Preservation of Life from Shipwreck in 1824. The Institution had received £9,000 in the preceding five years to 1932. The lifeboat was named at a ceremony on 25 July 1932, at the Groves and Guttridge boatyard in Cowes.

The 45-foot Watson-class relief lifeboat Duke of Connaught (ON 668) was launched at 09:00 on Sunday 5 September 1943 to the 9000-ton steamship SS Urlana, with a crew of 40 men, which had run aground 40 miles (64 km) away at Idrigill Point, on convoy passage to London from Buenos Aires. The crew of the Urlana has set about a transfer to the Thurland Castle, another steamship from the same convoy, which was standing by, and the lifeboat arrived at 14:15 to find the last 15 men in their own motor-powered ship's boat. At that point, the ship's boat's engine failed, and the lifeboat managed to set up a tow, before the boat was dashed on the rocks, and the 15 men were transferred safely to the Thurland Castle. Conditions too difficult to head for home, the lifeboat set out for Carbost, Loch Harport, overcoming their own engine problems en route. The lifeboat finally returned to Castlebay at 16:00 on Tuesday 7 September. Coxswain Murdo Sinclair received the RNLI Silver Medal, with monetary awards to the crew.

In 1955, the RNLI would receive one of the largest bequests received to date. Mrs E. M. M. Gordon Cubbin, late of the Isle of Man, left sufficient funds to provide four lifeboats, each costing in excess of £30,000. Two 46-foot 9in Watson-class lifeboats were to be stationed at Douglas and Port St Mary, and two larger 52-foot Barnett-class (Mk.II) lifeboats were for Mallaig and Barra Island. Barra Island received the lifeboat R. A. Colby Cubbon No.3 (ON 935) in 1957.

On Sunday 18 November 1979, both the Islay lifeboat, 50-002 Helmut Schroder of Dunlossit (ON 1032), and the Barra Island lifeboat, R. A. Colby Cubbon No.3 (ON 935), were launched just after midnight, to the aid of the Danish coaster Lone Dania, listing badly 6 miles (9.7 km) north west of Skerryvore Lighthouse, after her cargo had shifted in terrible condition. The wind strength varied from strong gale, force 9, to violent storm and hurricane, force 11 to 12, and gusts of up to 65 knots (120 km/h; 75 mph) were recorded at nearby airports. At 01:43, the Islay lifeboat was capsized. The lifeboat self-righted, and the crew were OK, with just the odd minor injury, but the boat had engine problems, a failed radar and windscreen wipers, and it was decided to return to port.

At 03:46, with the boat under full speed, the Barra Island lifeboat also capsized. Self-righting by virtue of an inflatable air-bag, the boat was upright almost immediately, but had suffered worse damage. She had windows smashed, and the propellers had been fouled by the lines from the drogue and couldn't be freed. The crew had suffered a few injuries, but were otherwise safe. Another coaster, Sapphire, which had also been heading to the Lone Dania, changed course, and took the Barra Island lifeboat under tow, and returned to port. The Lone Dania later made port under escort with another coaster. Coxswain Alastair Campbell of Islay lifeboat said they were the worst conditions he had encountered in 17 years as a lifeboat man, and in his previous career as a merchant seaman.

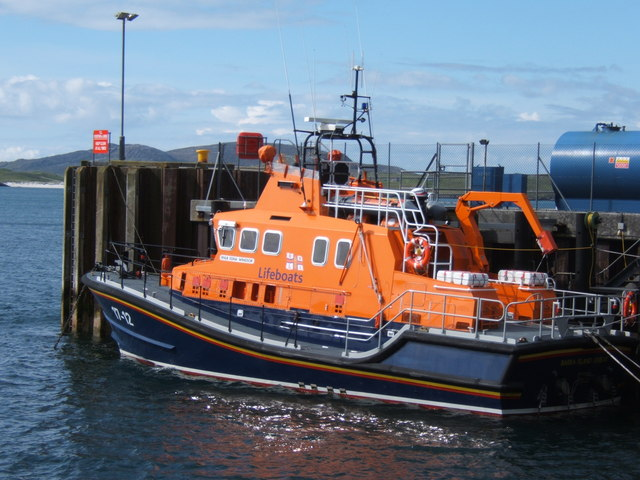
Severn-class lifeboat 17-12 Edna Windsor (ON 1230)

A new boat store was constructed in 1991, with workshop, kit-room and crew facilities, followed in 1994 with the installation of a 'Schat' launching davit for the boarding boat. In October 1998, an alongside berth was constructed.

Barra Island station would receive a new Severn-class lifeboat on Saturday 13 June 1998. She was funded by the generous bequest of Edna Windsor, who died in Malaysia in 1993, along with further legacies from Elizabeth Robertson Brechin, Irene Isabel Seaman, Evelyn Mary Stonehouse and Elsie Taylor. At a ceremony on 24 April 1999, Brenda MacInnes, granddaughter of Murdo Sinclair, Barra Island's first Coxswain, named the lifeboat 17-12 Edna Windsor (ON 1230).

In 2023, it was announced that the Barra Island lifeboat station was scheduled to receive an upgrade of facilities.

== Station honours ==
The following are awards made at Barra Island:

- RNLI Silver Medal
  Murdo Sinclair, Coxswain – 1943
- RNLI Bronze Medal
  Donald MacLeod, Coxswain – 2006
- Lady Swaythling Trophy for outstanding seamanship in 2006
  awarded by The Shipwrecked Fishermen and Mariners' Royal Benevolent Society
  Donald MacLeod, Coxswain – 2007
- 'A Framed Letter of Thanks signed by the Chairman of the Institution'
  Donald MacLeod, Coxswain – 2006
- Member, Order of the British Empire (MBE)
  Donald William MacLeod, Coxswain – 2013QBH

== Roll of honour ==
In memory of those lost whilst serving at Barra Island:

- Following the capsize of the boarding boat after a service call, 22 January 1942
  John McNeil (Taken ill and died of pneumonia)

== Barra Island lifeboats ==
ON (Note: ON is the RNLI's Official Number of the boat.)	Op.No. (Note: Op.No. is the RNLI's Operational Number of the boat carried on the hull.)	Name	Built	On station	Class	Comments
684	–	684 RM	1923	1931−1932	45-foot Watson	Previously John R. Webb at Tenby. Transferred to the Relief fleet. Later at Yarmouth.
754	–	Lloyd's	1932	1932−1957	51-foot Barnett (Stromness-class)	Transferred to the Relief fleet.
935	–	R. A. Colby Cubbon No.3	1957	1957−1984	52-foot Barnett (Mk.II)	
1020	48-015	Hugh William Viscount Gough	1973	1984−1988	Solent	Previously at Stornoway. Transferred to Dunbar.
1143	52-41	Ann Lewis Fraser	1988	1988−1998	Arun	Transferred to Tobermory.
1230	17-12	Edna Windsor	1998	1998−	Severn	

More post-service details can be found on the respective lifeboat class pages.

== See also ==
- List of RNLI stations
- List of former RNLI stations
- Royal National Lifeboat Institution lifeboats
