= RNLB Emma Constance =

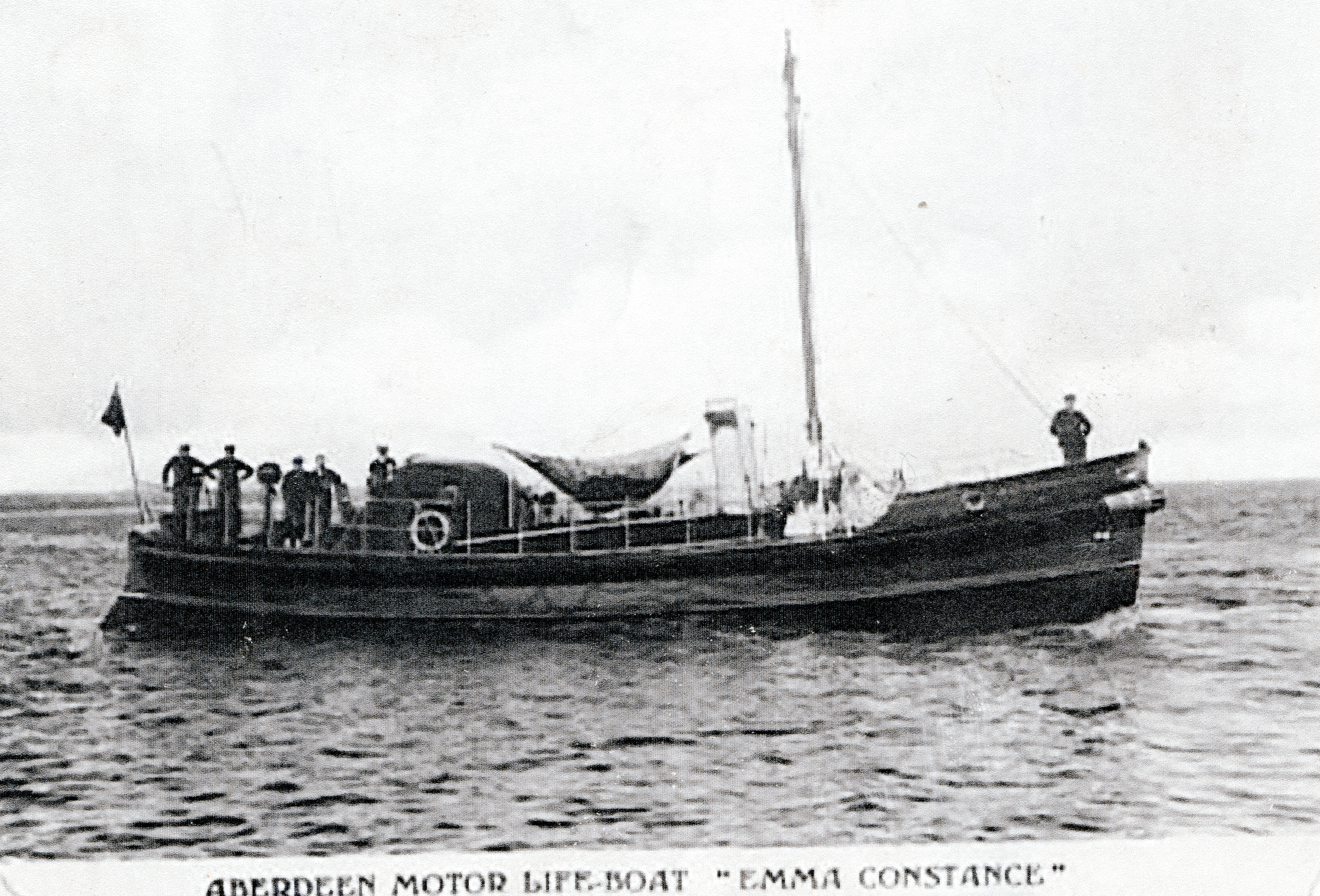
- RNLB Emma Constance (ON 693)

History

British RNLI Flag
- Owner: Royal National Lifeboat Institution (RNLI)
- Builder: Saunders-Roe
- Official Number: ON 693
- Donor: Legacy of John Mackie of York
- Station: Aberdeen
- Cost: £16,000
- Laid down: 1926
- Christened: 19 September 1927 by Lady Maud Carnegie
- Fate: Sold out of fleet in 1951.

General characteristics
- Class & type: Barnett-class
- Type: Motor lifeboat
- Displacement: 44.5 tons
- Length: 61 ft (19 m) overall
- Beam: 15 ft (4.6 m)
- Installed power: two RNLI DE6 petrol engines delivering 80Bhp
- Propulsion: Twin Screw
- Speed: 9.5 kn (17.6 km/h)
- Range: 150 miles at full power
- Crew: 6

RNLB Emma Constance (ON 693) was a Barnett-class lifeboat stationed at Aberdeen Lifeboat Station, in the Scottish city of Aberdeen from 1927 until August 1951. The lifeboat was designed by James R. Barnett who was a consulting naval architect to the Royal National Lifeboat Institution (RNLI).

== Description ==
At 61 feet long and 15 feet wide, the Emma Constance was a large lifeboat, and was one of only four Barnett-class lifeboats at this size. She had a draught of over 4 feet. When built, the Emma Constance and her sisters-in-class were the largest lifeboats in the RNLI fleet; only the 70-foot Clyde-class lifeboats built in the 1960s have been larger.

The Emma Constance was laid down in 1926 in the yards of Saunders Roe of East Cowes on the Isle of Wight. A total of fourteen watertight compartments made up the boat's hull. She was propelled by twin screws powered by twin RNLI DE6 petrol engines, each of which was housed in its own watertight compartment. Three separate fuel tanks at the rear of the engine compartments carried a fuel load of up to 500 gallons altogether. An auxiliary petrol engine powered a generator for the windlass at the front of the boat and a capstan at the back of the boat.

The Emma Constance carried a full set of sails in case of power loss, and a jumping net that could be set up to allow rescuees to jump down from their own ship and be hauled up to the lifeboat.

== History ==
=== Pre-christening rescues ===
The Emma Constance was first called out for service first service on 21 July 1927 to aid a trawler called Venetia which had run aground at Girdleness, although on arrival her assistance was not needed.

On 6 September that year she launched to her second service, in aid of the trawler Ben Torc, which had run into rough seas and dense fog off of Gregness Point near Aberdeen harbour. By 10 pm, heavy waves were battering the ship, and the skipper sounded the distress sirens. Coastguards manning Gregness station had climbed down the cliffs to the scene and managed, with great difficulty, to get a lifeline across to the trawler, but the trawler's crew preferred to wait for a lifeboat than risk the climb. At 10:27 pm the Emma Constance launched, and by the time of her arrival the Ben Torc was aground on a rocky outcrop called Gregness Point. The lifeboat carefully threaded the rocky waters to pull up to the Ben Torc. Five of the six crew jumped aboard, but the skipper fell into the sea and had to be hauled aboard by line. Fortunately, he was uninjured, and to the amusement of all present, his bowler hat had remained firmly on his head despite his misadventure. By midnight, Emma Constance had brought all six crewmen back to Aberdeen.

The Emma Constance was formally christened on 19 September 1927 in front of a crowd of 10,000–12,000 people. The bandsmen of the 4th Gordon Highlanders provided music, and Maud Carnegie, Countess of Southesk, performed the naming ceremony.

=== Trawler George Stroud ===
In the evening of 25 December 1935, Emma Constance launched to assist Aberdeen trawler George Stroud, who had been struck by an up-swell that knocked her against the wall of the North Pier at Aberdeen harbour, then battered further until she ran aground 200 yards from the seaward side of the pier. Members of the Royal Life Saving Society on the shore used rockets to attach lifelines to the George Stroud, but her crew of five men, sheltering in the wheelhouse, refused to attempt the climb and called for a lifeboat rescue. On arrival, the Emma Constance was positioned between the pier and the trawler. Only one crewman managed to get to the lifeboat before heavy waves dashed the lifeboat against the pier, damaging her and destroying the trawler's wheelhouse. One crewman was spotted in the sea but drowned before he could be rescued, while the Lifesavers working on shore managed to save another. Ultimately only two of the five crewmen were saved. The Emma Constance coxswain was awarded an RNLI Bronze Medal for his part in the rescue.

=== SS Fairy ===
From the 23rd to the 27th of January 1937, Scotland's east coast was battered by a forceful gale. The Fairy, a 249-ton collier (coal-bearing cargo ship), arrived at Aberdeen harbour on 24 January, only to discover the port closed due to the extremely rough waves. By the 25th, the Fairy had been driven 30 miles offshore and was filling with seawater. The captain declared an emergency and directed the crew to bail. He managed to take the ship to within nine miles of shore, where he signalled German trawler Hendrick for a tow. The pair made it to a point just off Donmouth by 4:30 pm, where they launched flares. Emma Constance launched to assist, but the captain of the Fairy wished to continue the tow rather than abandon his ship, so the Emma Constance stood by. After several hours of slow progress, the towline snapped and could not be reattached. At 10 pm the Fairy ran aground and was swamped by waves, as was the Emma Constance when she tried to approach. On a second approach, the lifeboat managed to rescue all seven of the Fairy's crewmen, but due to the rough seas were forced to make for Moray Firth rather than returning to Aberdeen. Badly damaged, they arrived at Moray Firth on 27 January at 4:30 pm. Crew members were awarded RNLI Medals in Silver and Bronze.

=== Retirement ===
On 14 January 1951 Emma Constance performed her last launch. She went to assist the yawl Glen of Aberdeen which had broken down 1 nautical mile east-north-east of Gregness. The lifeboat took the vessel into tow and returned to Aberdeen. In August 1951 the Emma Constance was retired from Aberdeen. Her replacement was a 52 ft Barnett-class lifeboat called RNLB Hilton Briggs (ON 889). Following her retirement the Emma Constance was sold out of the RNLI fleet and was renamed several times becoming first the Southern Cross followed by Achilleus and then Griselda.

== Record of service and rescues ==
RNLB Emma Constance (ON 693)
Date	Casualty	Wind/weather	Lives lost	Lives saved	Details
1927
27 July	Venetia	Heavy seas, moderate gale			Stood down when vessel towed to port by tug
6 September	Ben Torc	Moderate south-easterly breeze, moderate seas		6	Casualty stranded off Gregness, took off six men
1928
26/27 February	Isle of White	Medium south-south-west breeze, moderate seas			Casualty stranded off Belhelvie Beach, rescued by Newburgh lifeboat
18 March	Agnes H Weatherly	South-south-west breeze			Casualty stranded 1 mile from Donmouth, no assistance required
6 June	Regain	Strong south-westerly breeze, rough seas		8	Casualty stranded 1 mile off Belhelvie CG station, towed to safety
25 October	HM Drifter Lunar Bow	South westerly fresh breeze, moderate sea			Stood by, towed to safety by tug
25 October	HM Drifter Lunar Bow	South westerly fresh breeze, moderate sea		2	Rescued 1 injured naval rating and 1 midshipman
1929
10 January	Shetland	South-easterly breeze, rough seas			15 ft of water in vessel's hold, flooding taken under control
29 November	Wild Rose	South-easterly strong breeze, rough seas			Vessel stranded on rocks, nine rescued from beach
1930|-
22 January	John G Watson	South westerly strong breeze, rough seas			Stranded 6½ miles north of Aberdeen, stood by, rescue achieved by No. 2 lifeboat
1931
7 January	St Merryn	Westerly light breeze, smooth seas			Stranded and re-floated without the aid of lifeboat
9 April	Rightway	South westerly moderate breeze, moderate seas			Vessel stranded off Collieston CG station, crew rescued by LSA
2 June	Loyal Friend	Northerly moderate breeze, moderate seas			Lifeboat stood by following vessel's collision with North Pier
3 December	Nairn	South easterly whole gale, very heavy seas			Lifeboat recalled, not required
1932
14 August	Whitehills lifeboat	Smooth sea			Towed broken down lifeboat back to port
1933
1 January	Trawler Venetia	Southerly strong gale, very heavy seas	9		Vessel stranded 3 miles north of Stonehaven, vessel total loss with all hands
18 January	Ben Screel	Variable light breeze, heavy seas			Vessel stranded off Girdleness, lifeboat stood by, crew rescued from shore
19 January	General Birdwood	Northerly moderate breeze, moderate seas			Escorted Vessel
4 April	Lifeboat launched to false alarm				Lifeboat recalled after launch
3 July	Cretan of Glasgow	Calm and smooth seas			Lifeboat not required, vessel towed by pilot tug
20/21 October	Fair Isle	South-easterly fresh breeze, rough seas			Vessel with broken rudder, towed by other vessel. lifeboat escorted vessel back to Aberdeen
23/24 October	Granero of Drammen	North-easterly moderate gale, rough seas		7	Vessel stranded at Cawton Ness, crew saved by lifeboat and the LSA
29 December	Strathleven of Aberdeen	South-easterly moderate breeze, very heavy seas			Damaged steering gear, towed in by lifeboat, stood by to other vessels
1934
1 January	Fishing vessels of Gourdon & Stonehaven				Lifeboat on stand-by
20 December	Unknown trawler	Variable light wind, smooth seas			Search for vessel, nothing found
1935
14 February	Local fishing boats	Northerly moderate gale			Search of vessels caught in gale, all safe
2 February	Eldorado	South-south-easterly gale, heavy seas			Stood by, LSA safely landed crew north of Donmouth
24 June	Balmoral Castle of Aberdeen	Northerly moderate (fog), moderate seas			Vessel stranded, refloated on high tide
9 September	Ebor Abbey of Aberdeen	West-south-westerly moderate breeze, moderate seas			Lifeboat recalled, rescue by others
5 November	fishing vessels Procure & Quest of Banff	South-south-easterly moderate breeze, heavy seas			Escorted back to port
25 December	George Stroud of Aberdeen	South-easterly strong breeze, heavy seas	3	1	Grounded against North Pier, 1 taken off vessel by lifeboat, 1 taken off by LSA
31 December	Strathairlie of Aberdeen	Light variable winds, slight swell			Vessel with broken rudder, lifeboat stood by
1936
17 January	WM Porter Aberdeen pilot cutter	East-north-easterly fresh breeze, rough seas		3	Pilots fouled rudder on the wreck of George Stroud. Three taken off by lifeboat
21 January	Local fishing boats	East-south-easterly moderate gale, rough seas			Stood by until vessels safely in port
6 February	Pretoria of Aberdeen	South-westerly moderate gale, rough seas			vessel involved in collision, lifeboat assistance not required
23 February	Ocean Gift of Banff	East-south-easterly strong gale, very heavy seas			Adrift in harbour, lifeboat crew mustered but no launch
16 December	Margaret & Frances of Cockenzie	South-south-westerly strong gale, very heavy seas	2		Vessel stranded off Belhelvie CG station, vessel found but a total loss
1937
21/22 January	Strathebrie of Aberdeen	South-easterly strong gale, very heavy seas			Vessel taken into tow
23 January	Utility of Aberdeen	South-easterly strong gale, strong flood			vessel hung on stern moorings, vessel towed to fishmarket
26 January	Fairy of Kings Lynn	South-easterly gale, very heavy seas		7	See description Service and rescues section
16 April	Paul Rykens of Aberdeen	Calm, dense fog			Vessel stranded, re-floated under own power
RNLB J & W (ON 722), Relief (Watson-class)
30 December	Calvinia of Aberdeen	North-north-westerly moderate breeze			vessel lost prop, search aborted after vessel was towed into Aberdeen by others
1938
25 August	Carry On	Variable fog banks, slight swell			Vessel aground, towed off by lifeboat
4 December	Branch of Montrose	Southerly moderate gale, rough seas			Reported in difficulties, search carried out, vessel towed to port by others
1939
22 January	Unknown vessel reported capsized	East-south-easterly slight breeze, slight seas			Search carried out but nothing found
World War II
15 September	Vessel reported torpedoed	North easterly moderate breeze			Launched to scene, recalled, not required
10 October	Solstad of Oslo	South-easterly storm. heavy seas			Search carried out, vessel towed to port by others
31 October	Cairnmona of Newcastle upon Tyne	Easterly light to moderate breeze, rough seas			Vessel torpedoed off Rattray Head by U-13, survivors landed by others
12 December	Cimbria of Copenhagen				Crew mustered only, no launch
18 December	Trinity NB of Aberdeen	West-south-westerly, moderate seas	3		Vessel reported bombed, search carried out, no trace found, survivors picked up by Danish schooner Start
1940
9 January	Gowrie of Dundee				vessel sunk by enemy aircraft four miles east of Stonehaven, crew rescued by others, search carried out for wreckage but nothing found
9 January	Feddy of Copenhagen	South-south-westerly fresh breeze		2	Vessel bombed and on fire, crew members taken off, escorted vessel.
9 January	Ivan Kondrup of Copenhagen	South-south-westerly fresh breeze	1		Vessel bombed. reached port under own steam, one crewman missing
10 January	Feddy of Copenhagen	South-south-westerly light breeze			vessel towed into Aberdeen
9 February	Lily of Aberdeen	South-westerly wind, moderate swell		3	Vessel disabled, found by lifeboat and taken into tow
3 March	Unknown bombed vessel reported	North-westerly moderate breeze, slight seas			Search carried out but nothing found
18 July	Shipping convoys attacked off Aberdeen on 17 July				Lifeboat and crew on standby at the station
20 October	Conakrain of Freetown	East-south-easterly breeze, rough seas			Torpedo damaged in air attack of Girdleness, taken into tow by tug, escorted by lifeboat
21 October	Conakrain of Freetown			2	Two taken off vessel in Aberdeen bay in heavy weather
23 October	Conakrain of Freetown	Easterly moderate gale, moderate seas		23	Crewmen taken off vessel at request of the Royal Navy
1941
3 April	Cairnie	East-south-easterly force 7 to 8, very heavy seas		7	Vessel bombed and in distress, Aberdeen harbour entrance, steering damaged and grounded
24 July	Unknown vessel	Calm, smooth seas			search carried out, nothing found
8 August	Unknown vessel				lifeboat on stand-by only
2 October	RAF aircraft	Westerly force 4, moderate seas			ditched pilot rescued by others, lifeboat recalled
1942
13 March	Unknown vessel	South-south-westerly force 6, heavy seas			No record kept of launch
3 March	HMS Hyderabad and the tug Bruno	Southerly force 3 to 4, smooth seas			Both vessels grounded, lifeboat towed of tug, corvette refloated herself
4 April	Bon Accord of Aberdeen				No record kept of the launch
1943
2 April	Unknown vessel				No record kept of the launch
7 April	Schooner Else of Thisted, Denmark	North force 6 to 9, very rough seas			Vessel towed into port with lifeboat escorting
29 November	Trevorian of St Ives	Smooth seas			No record kept of the launch
1944
23 October	Keilehaven of Rotterdam	South-easterly breeze force 3 to 4, growing swells		40	Crew abandoned ship to US ship, but some returned to vessel by lifeboat
1945
10/11 April	Albert Victor of Vága	Easterly breeze force 3 to 4, breaking surf		9	run aground, lifeboat took off crew and pilot
13 April	Maria of IJmuiden	Light easterly breeze			Lifeboat stood by
RNLB John Russel (ON 699) Relief (Watson-class)
30 July	May Lily of Peterhead	Slight seas			Vessel with engine failure, lifeboat made search, vessel made port under own power
19 October	HM Motor Fishing Vessel 1172	South-south-easterly breeze force 3 to 5, moderate to rough seas		5	Vessel disabled, towed into Aberdeen by lifeboat
19 December	T L Devlin of Granton	Southerly breeze force 5 to 7			Escorted vessel to port
21 December	Sparkling Star of Peterhead	Light southerly wind, smooth seas			Fouled prop, self-cleared, lifeboat stood down
1946
20 January	Spurs of Grimsby				vessel aground in navigation channel, lifeboat damaged whilst standing by
7 August	Harmonious II of Aberdeen	South-westerly breeze force 2 to 3, light to moderate seas		6	Broken down vessel, towed into port
1947
20 October	Harvest Gleaner of Buckie	South-south-westerly breeze force 5, moderate seas			Towed into port by others, lifeboat stood down
1948
5 February	Northman of Aberdeen	Southerly breeze force 4 to 6			Both vessel and lifeboat grounded, pulled off by tug
1949
13 January	Welbeckof Grimsby	South-westerly breeze force 2, smooth to slight seas			Lifeboat then tug towed vessel off
23 September	Alirmay of Aberdeen	South-easterly breeze force 3 to 4			Lifeboat recalled, not required
24 September	Brightside	Easterly breeze force 1 to 2, slight seas			Stranded vessel, crew landed by others, lifeboat recalled
1950
19 September	Saga of Aberdeen	South-south-easterly force 8 to 9, very high seas			Vessel with engine failure, Aberdeen lifeboat recalled
19 September	Saga of Aberdeen	South-south-easterly force 8 to 9, very high seas			Second launch to vessel towed by Peterhead lifeboat, Aberdeen lifeboat escorted
26 September	Lyndburn of Aberdeen	North-easterly force 4, rough seas		1	Vessel grounded, lifeboat takes off 1
1951
14 February	Yawl Glen of Aberdeen	South-easterly force 3 to 4, slight seas		2	Vessel broken down, towed into port by lifeboat

Preceded by Private Lifeboat; Star of the Waves	RNLB Emma Constance (ON 693); 1927 to 1951	Succeeded by RNLB Hilton Briggs (ON 889)
