= Barnett-class lifeboat =

Former RNLI lifeboat class

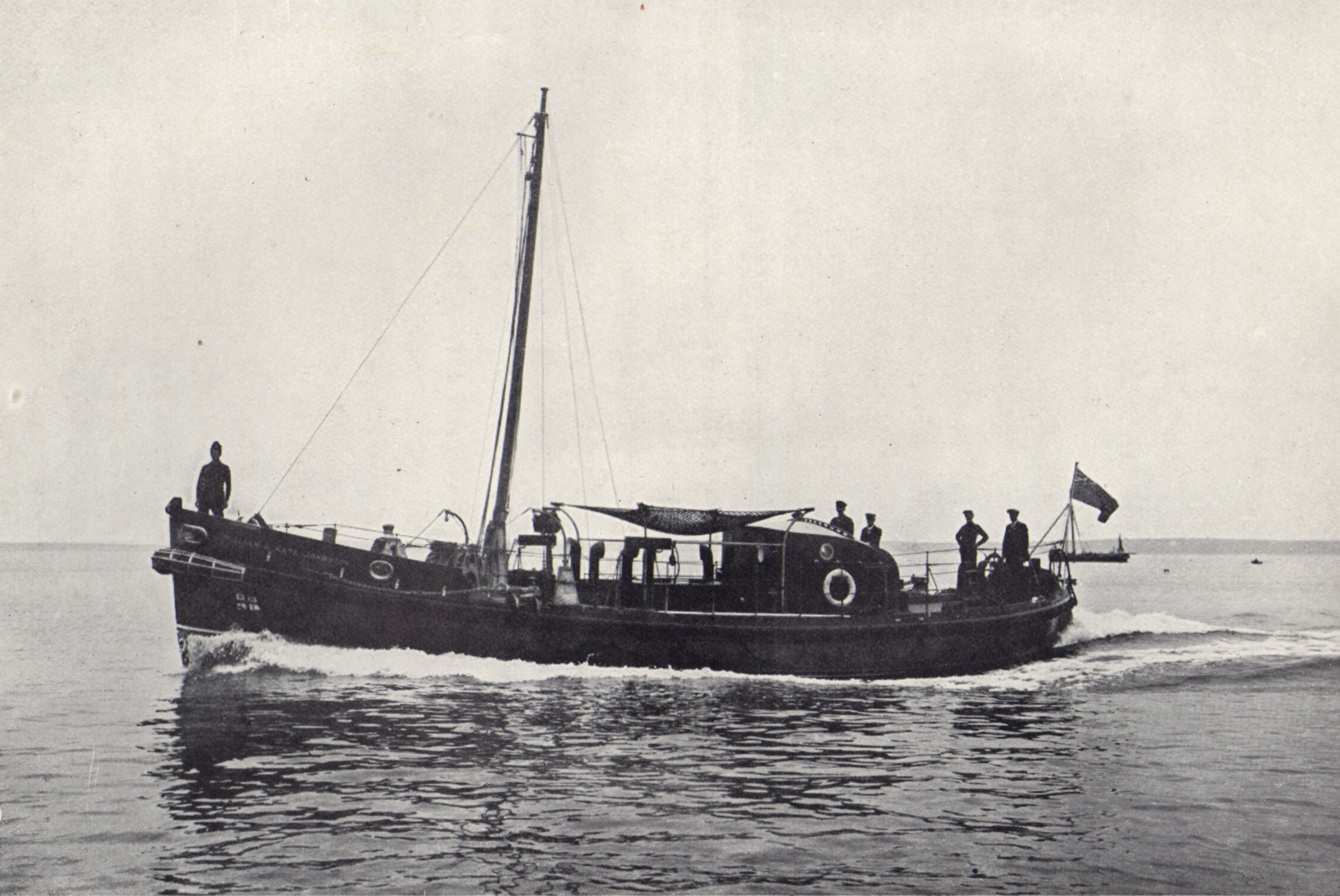
- RNLB William and Kate Johnston (ON 682)

Class overview
- Builders: J Samuel White, Cowes; S. E. Saunders, Cowes; Saunders-Roe, Cowes; Groves & Guttridge, Cowes; Rowhedge Ironworks, Rowhedge
- Operators: Royal National Lifeboat Institution
- Built: 60-foot: 1923–1929; 51-foot: 1928–1949; 52-foot (Mk. I): 1950–1955; 52-foot (Mk. II): 1957–1960
- In service: 1923–1988
- Completed: 60-foot: 4; 51-foot: 13; 52-foot (Mk. I): 10; 52-foot (Mk. II): 10
- Retired: 37

General characteristics
- Type: Motor lifeboat
- Displacement: 60-foot: 40–44 tons; 51-foot: 27 tons; 52-foot: 28 tons
- Length: 51–60 ft (16–18 m)
- Beam: 60-foot: 15 ft (4.6 m); 51-foot: 13 ft 6 in (4.11 m); 52-foot (Mk. I): 13 ft 6 in (4.11 m); 52-foot (Mk. II): 14 ft (4.3 m)
- Installed power: 60-foot:2 x 80-bhp D.E. 6-cyl. petrol; 51-foot: 2 x 60-bhp Weyburn CE6 6-cyl. petrol; 52-foot (Mk. I): 2 x 60-bhp Ferry VE6 6-cyl. diesel; 52-foot (Mk. II) 2 x 72-bhp Gardner 6LW 6cyl. diesel
- Propulsion: 2 × pitch propellers in tunnels
- Speed: 9.5 knots (10.9 mph; 17.6 km/h)
- Range: 300 nautical miles (350 mi; 560 km)
- Crew: 6

The Barnett-class lifeboat consists of three types of non self-righting displacement hull lifeboats, operated by the Royal National Lifeboat Institution (RNLI) from its stations around the coasts of the United Kingdom and Ireland, between 1923 and 1988.

== History ==
The Barnett-class lifeboat was designed in 1923 by James Rennie Barnett, OBE, MINA, the Consulting Naval Architect for the Institution, and was named after him. The boat was a significant development in lifeboat design, as it was the first RNLI lifeboat to have twin engines and twin screws.

Previously, every lifeboat carried a full set of sails, and even lifeboats fitted with engines had to maintain their sailing qualities. The Barnett-class was the first motor-powered lifeboat dependent solely on its engines. The engines sat in separate watertight engines rooms. Each engine was itself watertight, and would continue to run if the engine-room was flooded, with the engine entirely submerged. The air-intakes were located well above the water-line, even if the boat is waterlogged, and with the exception of the first of this type, the exhausts were carried up two funnels amidships.

The lifeboats had an open aft cockpit with a shelter ahead of it. There were fore and aft survivor cabins below deck, with seating for 24. If required, the boat could carry up to 130.

The boat adopted an idea from the Dutch Life-boat Service, and has a life-saving net fitted amidships, to assist with the recovery of survivors into the boat. Equipment included a line-throwing gun, an electric searchlight and an electric capstan, with electric lighting throughout. An oil spray was fitted in the bows, used to dampen the effects of waves around the lifeboat, and a fire-extinguishing plant, worked from the deck, could throw jets of Pyrene fluid to all vital parts of the casualty boat.

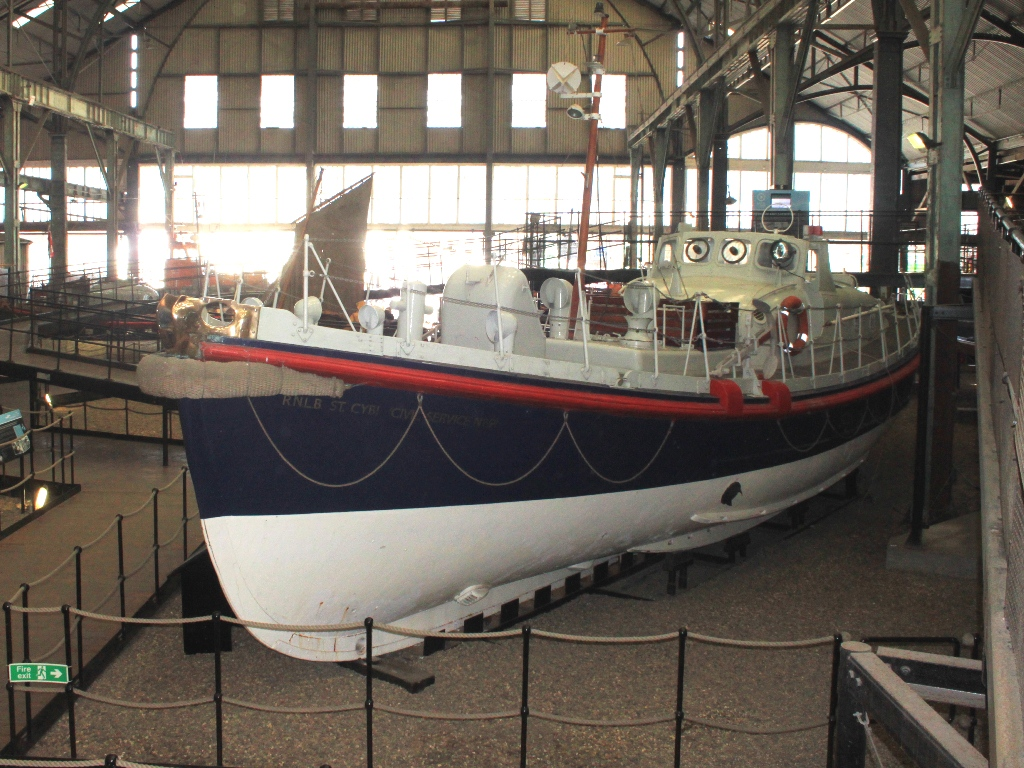
52-foot Barnett (Mk. I) St Cybi (Civil Service No.9) at the RNLI Heritage Collection at Chatham Historic Dockyard.

This type of lifeboat was intended only for stations where long distances may have to be covered, and where the life-boat can lie afloat. After making a tour round the British Isles, the first of the type was placed at New Brighton on the River Mersey in 1923.

== 60-foot Barnett ==
=== History ===
When it was introduced in 1923, the 60-foot Barnett-class lifeboat was the largest and fastest lifeboat operated by the RNLI. The boats pioneered many features which were to become standard on future lifeboats. They were, however, too large to be slipway launched, and had to be moored afloat, at a time when the RNLI preferred to keep lifeboats in boathouses. As a result, only four were built.

=== Description ===
The first Barnett-class lifeboats were 60 feet (18 m) long x 15 feet (4.6 m) beam, with a draught of 4 feet 5 inches (1.35 m). The boats were powered by two 80-bhp DE6 6-cylinder petrol engines, designed by the RNLI, with three built by Weyburn Engineering, and the fourth by J. Samuel White. The engines give a maximum speed of 9 knots. Maximum speed could be maintained even in very severe weather, with the lifeboat carrying sufficient petrol to travel 310 miles at full speed. The fourth, and final boat, Princess Mary (ON 715), stationed at Padstow Harbour, was 61 ft (18.6 m) long, due to a forward raked bow.

The boat had a displacement of just over 44 tons. It was divided into fourteen water-tight compartments, fitted with seventy air cases. Construction was with a skin and keel made of teak, ribs of Canadian rock-elm, and a stem and stern-post of English oak.

The boats served their stations well until the early 1950s, when they were replaced by 52-foot Barnett-class.

=== Fleet ===
| ON (Note: ON is the RNLI's Official Number of the boat.) | Name | Built | In service | Station | Comments |
|---|---|---|---|---|---|
| 682 | William and Kate Johnston | 1923 | 1923–1950 | New Brighton | (Note: Gift of Mr S. Johnston, Mrs Kendall, and the Liverpool LB fund, built by J. Samuel White of Cowes, with twin 80-hp Weyburn DE6 6-cyl. petrol engines, costing £16,084.) Sold December 1950. Stored for restoration at Sandon Half Tide Dock, Liverpool, December 2024. |
| 693 | Emma Constance | 1926 | 1926–1951 | Aberdeen No.1 | (Note: Legacy of Mr J. Mackie, built by S. E. Saunders of Cowes, with twin 80-hp Weyburn DE6 6-cyl. petrol engines, costing £15,821.) Sold November 1951. Renamed Southern Cross, later Achilleus. Now Griselda, an open hull, aground at Keils House, Tayvallich, Argyll, December 2024. |
| 696 | Robert and Marcella Beck | 1926 | 1926–1943 | Plymouth | (Note: Legacy of Mr R. A. Beck, built by J. Samuel White of Cowes, with twin 80-hp White DE6 6-cyl. petrol engines, costing £14,536.) Sold June 1952. Renamed Blaskbeg. Now Idle Hours at Lemmer, Netherlands, October 2025. |
| 696 | Robert and Marcella Beck | 1926 | 1943–1947 | Iceland (RN) | Sold June 1952. Renamed Blaskbeg. Now Idle Hours at Lemmer, Netherlands, October 2025. |
| 696 | Robert and Marcella Beck | 1926 | 1947–1952 | Plymouth | Sold June 1952. Renamed Blaskbeg. Now Idle Hours at Lemmer, Netherlands, October 2025. |
| 715 | Princess Mary | 1929 | 1929–1952 | Padstow Harbour | (Note: 61 ft (18.6 m) lifeboat, gift of P&O Shipping Co., built by S. E. Saunders of Cowes, with twin 80-hp Weyburn DE6 6-cyl. petrol engines, costing £14,602.) Sold June 1952. Renamed Aries. The Aries was the first small powered craft to make the double crossing of the Atlantic Ocean without the use of sail. Severe storms were encountered on each leg; an outward voyage of 33 days, and the return trip of 23 days. Last reported as a yacht at Ibiza, October 2022. |

== 51-foot Barnett (Stromness-class) ==
=== History ===
The 60-foot Barnett was too large and heavy to be slipway launched and so the 51 ft (15.5 m) type was designed as a scaled down version which would be able to be stationed at a greater number of locations. The class is sometimes referred to as the "Stromness" after the first station to receive one.

=== Description ===
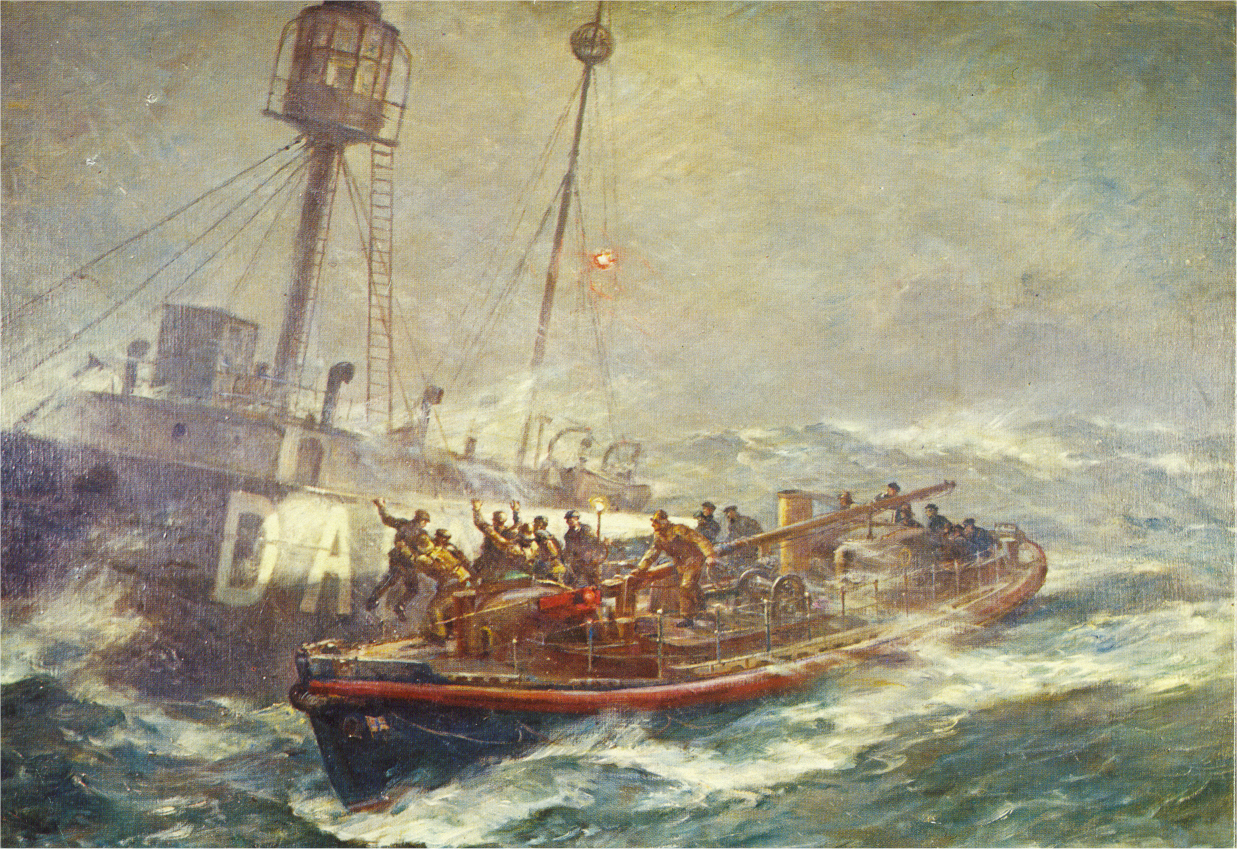
Mary Stanford (ON 733)

The 51-foot Barnett had an open aft cockpit with a shelter ahead of it giving access to the engine room. Ahead of the engine room was a survivor cabin and there was a forward shelter ahead of the mast. The class, with the exception of ON 860, was powered by twin 60-bhp Weyburn CE6 6-cylinder petrol engines, with a single exhaust funnel ahead of the aft shelter.

The final boat of the class, RNLB Southern Africa (ON 860), was built in 1949, fourteen years after the end of regular production, and was more akin in deck layout to the first five 46ft 9in Watson-class boats built around the same time. This boat was powered by two 60-bhp Ferry VE6 6-cylinder diesels and was in effect a prototype for a post war production run of diesel powered boats. However, it was overtaken by events as James Barnett turned to midships cockpits and the new boats emerged as the 52 ft [15.8 m] class the following year. The only other 51-foot Watson to receive diesel engines was Peter and Sarah Blake (ON 755) which was re-engined with twin Ford based 65 bhp Parsons Barracuda diesels in 1965. In 1976, Southern Africa (ON 860) also received Barracudas while serving in the relief fleet and this boat was the final member of the class in service when retired in 1981.

=== Fleet ===
| ON | Name | Built | In service | Station | Comments |
|---|---|---|---|---|---|
| 702 | J.J.K.S.W. | 1928 | 1928–1955 | Stromness | (Note: Legacies of Miss J. Moody of Derby, Mr J. P. Trail of London, Mr W. M. Aitken of Edinburgh, Mr E. J. Hanson of Belper, and Mr W. Notting of Bush Hill Park, built by S. E. Saunders of Cowes, costing £13,643.) Sold 1965. Became a workboat named Jon Dee (BS 19). Broken up at Dickies, Bangor, County Down, August 2000. |
| 702 | J.J.K.S.W. | 1928 | 1955–1964 | Reserve fleet | Sold 1965. Became a workboat named Jon Dee (BS 19). Broken up at Dickies, Bangor, County Down, August 2000. |
| 717 | A.E.D. | 1929 | 1929–1950 | Holyhead | (Note: Legacy of Capt. W. A. Dobie, built by J. Samuel White of Cowes, costing £10,119.) Sold 1957. Last reported at Fuengirola, Spain, February 1992. |
| 717 | A.E.D. | 1929 | 1951–1957 | Valentia | Sold 1957. Last reported at Fuengirola, Spain, February 1992. |
| 718 | William and Harriot | 1929 | 1929–1954 | Stornoway | (Note: Legacy of Mrs H. Richardson, built by J. Samuel White of Cowes, costing £10,469.) Sold 1959. Broken up at Barry Docks in 1976. |
| 718 | William and Harriot | 1929 | 1954–1959 | Reserve fleet | Sold 1959. Broken up at Barry Docks in 1976. |
| 719 | Queen Victoria | 1929 | 1929–1940 | St Peter Port | (Note: From RNLI funds, built by J. Samuel White of Cowes, costing £10,481.) Sold May 1958. Destroyed by fire on the River Hamble in 1978. |
| 719 | Queen Victoria | 1929 | 1940–1941 | Reserve fleet | Sold May 1958. Destroyed by fire on the River Hamble in 1978. |
| 719 | Queen Victoria | 1929 | 1941–1945 | Killybegs | Sold May 1958. Destroyed by fire on the River Hamble in 1978. |
| 719 | Queen Victoria | 1929 | 1945–1954 | St Peter Port | Sold May 1958. Destroyed by fire on the River Hamble in 1978. |
| 719 | Queen Victoria | 1929 | 1954–1958 | Reserve fleet | Sold May 1958. Destroyed by fire on the River Hamble in 1978. |
| 720 | City of Glasgow | 1929 | 1929–1953 | Campbeltown | (Note: From RNLI funds, built by J. Samuel White of Cowes, costing £10,198.) Sold 1959. Last reported as yacht Elfred at Barry Docks, destroyed in the 1970s. |
| 720 | City of Glasgow | 1929 | 1953–1959 | Reserve fleet | Sold 1959. Last reported as yacht Elfred at Barry Docks, destroyed in the 1970s. |
| 731 | Lady Jane and Martha Ryland | 1930 | 1930–1958 | Lerwick | (Note: Legacy of Mr W. Ryland, built by J. Samuel White of Cowes, costing £10,414.) Sold 1969. Renamed The Lady Jane. At the Old Mill Boatyard, Old Mill Creek, Dartmouth, Devon, April 2025. |
| 731 | Lady Jane and Martha Ryland | 1930 | 1958–1969 | Reserve | Sold 1969. Renamed The Lady Jane. At the Old Mill Boatyard, Old Mill Creek, Dartmouth, Devon, April 2025. |
| 733 | Mary Stanford | 1930 | 1930–1959 | Ballycotton | (Note: Legacy of Mr J. Stanford, built by Saunders-Roe of Cowes, costing £9,403.) Sold 1969. Restored and on display, at Cliff Walk, Ballycotton, Ireland since 2015. |
| 733 | Mary Stanford | 1930 | 1959–1968 | Reserve fleet | Sold 1969. Restored and on display, at Cliff Walk, Ballycotton, Ireland since 2015. |
| 734 | George Shee | 1930 | 1930–1958 | Torbay | (Note: From RNLI funds, built by Saunders-Roe of Cowes, costing £9,614.) Sold December 1958. Used as a lifeboat in Guatemala from 1959. |
| 734 | George Shee | 1930 | 1958 | Reserve fleet | Sold December 1958. Used as a lifeboat in Guatemala from 1959. |
| 735 | William and Clara Ryland | 1930 | 1930–1957 | Weymouth | (Note: Legacy of Mr W. Ryland, built by Saunders-Roe of Cowes, costing £9,413.) Sold 1958. Renamed Ryland. Houseboat at Hundred of Hoo Sailing Club, Hoo Peninsula, December 2020, sank at moorings in December 2023, now under restoration, August 2024. |
| 754 | Lloyds | 1932 | 1932–1957 | Barra Island | (Note: Gift of the members of Lloyd's of London, built by Groves & Guttridge of Cowes, costing £9,443.) Sold January 1970. On hard standing, Sandwich Marina, Kent, May 2023. |
| 754 | Lloyds | 1932 | 1957–1969 | Reserve fleet | Sold January 1970. On hard standing, Sandwich Marina, Kent, May 2023. |
| 755 | Peter and Sarah Blake | 1932 | 1932–1958 | Fenit (Tralee Bay) | (Note: Legacy of Miss S. Blake, built by J. Samuel White of Cowes, costing £8,978. Re-engined with twin 65-hp Parsons Barracuda diesel engines, 1975.) Sold October 1972. Undergoing conversion to houseboat, at Fox's Marina, Ipswich, September 2025. |
| 755 | Peter and Sarah Blake | 1932 | 1958–1972 | Reserve fleet | Sold October 1972. Undergoing conversion to houseboat, at Fox's Marina, Ipswich, September 2025. |
| 776 | The Rankin | 1935 | 1935–1961 | Aith | (Note: Legacy of Miss M. D. Rankin, built by Groves & Guttridge of Cowes, costing £9,122.) Sold 1970. Renamed Penny Dragon, later Perseverance. Working as a pleasure boat at Tipner Boating and Angling Club, Portsmouth, November 2025. |
| 776 | The Rankin | 1935 | 1961–1969 | Reserve fleet | Sold 1970. Renamed Penny Dragon, later Perseverance. Working as a pleasure boat at Tipner Boating and Angling Club, Portsmouth, November 2025. |
| 860 | Southern Africa | 1949 | 1949–1967 | Dover | (Note: Funded by the Southern Africa branch of the RNLI, built by Rowhedge Ironworks of Rowhedge, Essex, with twin 60-hp Ferry VE6 6-cyl. diesel engines, costing £20,592. Re-engined with twin 65-hp Parsons Barracuda diesel engines, 1975.) Sold July 1981. Renamed Valparaiso III, later Southern Africa. Pleasure boat at the Clyde Boatyard, Glasgow, December 2023. |
| 860 | Southern Africa | 1949 | 1967–1981 | Reserve fleet | Sold July 1981. Renamed Valparaiso III, later Southern Africa. Pleasure boat at the Clyde Boatyard, Glasgow, December 2023. |

== 52-foot Barnett (Mk. I) ==
All 52-foot Barnett (Mk. I) lifeboats were 52 feet (16 m) long x 13 feet 6 inches (4.11 m) beam, manufactured between 1950 and 1955 by J. Samuel White, and powered by twin 60-hp Ferry VE6 engines. All were subsequently fitted with air-bags for self-righting capability, and most had a Wheelhouse and Radar fitted in the 1960s/70s.

=== Fleet ===
| ON | Name | Built | In service | Station | W/H | Radar | Comments |
|---|---|---|---|---|---|---|---|
| 883 | Norman B. Corlett | 1950 | 1950–1973 | New Brighton | 1963 | 1968 | (Note: Barnett lifeboat the gift of Mr N. Corlett and family, costing £20,265. Re-engined with twin 78-hp Thornycroft diesel engines, 1968.) Sold February 1982. Converted to be a houseboat for holiday letting at Coalisland, Northern Ireland, December 2019. |
| 883 | Norman B. Corlett | 1950 | 1973–1981 | Relief fleet | 1963 | 1968 | Sold February 1982. Converted to be a houseboat for holiday letting at Coalisland, Northern Ireland, December 2019. |
| 884 | St.Cybi (Civil Service No. 9) | 1950 | 1950–1980 | Holyhead | 1960 | 1966 | (Note: Barnett lifeboat the gift of the Civil Service LB fund, costing £28,906. Re-engined with twin 75-hp Parsons Barracuda diesel engines, 1966.) Sold 1986. On display in the RNLI Heritage Collection at Chatham Historic Dockyard since April 1996. |
| 884 | St.Cybi (Civil Service No. 9) | 1950 | 1980–1986 | Relief fleet | 1960 | 1966 | Sold 1986. On display in the RNLI Heritage Collection at Chatham Historic Dockyard since April 1996. |
| 889 | Hilton Briggs | 1951 | 1951–1958 | Aberdeen No.1 | 1962 | No | (Note: Barnett lifeboat the gift of Mrs Briggs, costing £29,928.) Sold July 1976. Houseboat at Wapping Wharf, Bristol, August 2024. |
| 889 | Hilton Briggs | 1951 | 1959–1969 | Fenit (Tralee Bay) | 1962 | No | Sold July 1976. Houseboat at Wapping Wharf, Bristol, August 2024. |
| 889 | Hilton Briggs | 1951 | 1969–1970 | Reserve fleet | 1962 | No | Sold July 1976. Houseboat at Wapping Wharf, Bristol, August 2024. |
| 889 | Hilton Briggs | 1951 | 1970 | Longhope | 1962 | No | Sold July 1976. Houseboat at Wapping Wharf, Bristol, August 2024. |
| 889 | Hilton Briggs | 1951 | 1970–1974 | Reserve fleet | 1962 | No | Sold July 1976. Houseboat at Wapping Wharf, Bristol, August 2024. |
| 889 | Hilton Briggs | 1951 | 1974–1975 | Invergordon | 1962 | No | Sold July 1976. Houseboat at Wapping Wharf, Bristol, August 2024. |
| 890 | Thomas Forehead & Mary Rowse | 1952 | 1952–1974 | Plymouth | 1962 | 1967 | (Note: Barnett lifeboat the gift of Mrs Rowse, costing £30,875. Re-engined with twin 78-hp Thornycroft diesel engines, 1972.) Sold December 1982. Renamed Isle Ornsay. Undergoing a refit at Porth Penrhyn, Bangor, September 2025. |
| 890 | Thomas Forehead & Mary Rowse | 1952 | 1974–1982 | Relief fleet | 1962 | 1967 | Sold December 1982. Renamed Isle Ornsay. Undergoing a refit at Porth Penrhyn, Bangor, September 2025. |
| 898 | Joseph Hiram Chadwick | 1952 | 1952–1967 | Padstow Harbour | 1962 | 1972 | (Note: Barnett lifeboat the gift of Miss Chadwick, costing £31,584. Re-engined with twin 78-hp Thornycroft diesel engines, 1968.) Sold April 1980. Undergoing restoration at Goodchild Marine, Burgh Castle, July 2022. Project abandoned. Sold in May 2024, now under restoration by the new owner at Sharpness, Gloucestershire, September 2025. |
| 898 | Joseph Hiram Chadwick | 1952 | 1968–1977 | Galway Bay | 1962 | 1972 | Sold April 1980. Undergoing restoration at Goodchild Marine, Burgh Castle, July 2022. Project abandoned. Sold in May 2024, now under restoration by the new owner at Sharpness, Gloucestershire, September 2025. |
| 898 | Joseph Hiram Chadwick | 1952 | 1977–1980 | Relief fleet | 1962 | 1972 | Sold April 1980. Undergoing restoration at Goodchild Marine, Burgh Castle, July 2022. Project abandoned. Sold in May 2024, now under restoration by the new owner at Sharpness, Gloucestershire, September 2025. |
| 899 | City of Glasgow II | 1953 | 1953–1979 | Campbeltown | 1960 | No | (Note: Barnett lifeboat the gift of the City of Glasgow LB fund, costing £31,629. Re-engined with twin 78-hp Thornycroft diesel engines, 1969.) Sold April 1980. Heavily modified, at Titchmarsh Marina, Walton-on-the-Naze, May 2025. |
| 912 | Euphrosyne Kendal | 1954 | 1954–1972 | St Peter Port | 1960 | 1966 | (Note: Barnett lifeboat the legacy of Mrs Kendal, costing £34,916. Re-engined with twin 70-hp Mermaid 595 diesel engines, 1973.) Sold May 1983. Engines removed and broken up at Rushbrooke, County Cork, Ireland, December 2015. |
| 912 | Euphrosyne Kendal | 1954 | 1973–1975 | Dunmore East | 1960 | 1966 | Sold May 1983. Engines removed and broken up at Rushbrooke, County Cork, Ireland, December 2015. |
| 912 | Euphrosyne Kendal | 1954 | 1975–1983 | Relief fleet | 1960 | 1966 | Sold May 1983. Engines removed and broken up at Rushbrooke, County Cork, Ireland, December 2015. |
| 913 | James & Margaret Boyd | 1954 | 1954–1973 | Stornoway | 1960 | 1969 | (Note: Barnett lifeboat the legacies of Mrs Boyd, Mrs Grant and Dr Tennant, costing £35,294. Re-engined with twin 78-hp Thornycroft diesel engines, 1969.) Sold January 1985. Renamed Grey Goose, later Sea Terror. Houseboat, sunk at English Harbour, Antigua, on 10 December 2010. |
| 913 | James & Margaret Boyd | 1954 | 1974–1975 | Macduff | 1960 | 1969 | Sold January 1985. Renamed Grey Goose, later Sea Terror. Houseboat, sunk at English Harbour, Antigua, on 10 December 2010. |
| 913 | James & Margaret Boyd | 1954 | 1975–1984 | Invergordon | 1960 | 1969 | Sold January 1985. Renamed Grey Goose, later Sea Terror. Houseboat, sunk at English Harbour, Antigua, on 10 December 2010. |
| 923 | John Gellatly Hyndman | 1955 | 1955–1972 | Stronsay | 1962 | 1971 | (Note: Barnett lifeboat the legacies of Miss Hyndman, costing £35,616. Re-engined with twin 78-hp Thornycroft diesel engines, 1971.) Sold August 1985. Renamed Stronsay, later Sea Terra. Last reported at English Harbour, Antigua, June 2024. |
| 923 | John Gellatly Hyndman | 1955 | 1972–1985 | Relief fleet | 1962 | 1971 | Sold August 1985. Renamed Stronsay, later Sea Terra. Last reported at English Harbour, Antigua, June 2024. |
| 924 | Archibald and Alexander M. Paterson | 1955 | 1955–1984 | Stromness | 1961 | 1970 | (Note: Barnett lifeboat the gift of Miss Paterson, costing £35,919. Re-engined with twin 78-hp Thornycroft diesel engines, 1970.) Sold May 1989. Last reported at Lawrenny Quay on the River Cleddau estuary in Wales, August 2021. |
| 924 | Archibald and Alexander M. Paterson | 1955 | 1985–1986 | Arranmore | 1961 | 1970 | Sold May 1989. Last reported at Lawrenny Quay on the River Cleddau estuary in Wales, August 2021. |
| 924 | Archibald and Alexander M. Paterson | 1955 | 1986–1987 | Lowestoft | 1961 | 1970 | Sold May 1989. Last reported at Lawrenny Quay on the River Cleddau estuary in Wales, August 2021. |

== 52-foot Barnett (Mk. II) ==
All 52-foot Barnett (Mk. II) lifeboats were 52 feet (16 m) long x 14 feet (4.3 m) beam, manufactured between 1957 and 1960 by J. Samuel White and Groves and Guttridge, powered by twin 72-hp Gardner 6LW 6-cyl. diesel engines. All were subsequently fitted with air-bags for self-righting capability, and Radar fitted in the 1960s/70s.

=== Fleet ===
| ON | Name | Built | In service | Station | Radar | Comments |
|---|---|---|---|---|---|---|
| 935 | R. A. Colby Cubbin No.3 | 1957 | 1957–1984 | Barra Island | 1971 | (Note: Legacy of Mrs Cubbin, built by J. Samuel White of Cowes, costing £38,500.) Sold November 1984. Heavily converted houseboat at City Marina, Rotterdam, April 2025. |
| 936 | E.M.M. Gordon Cubbin | 1957 | 1957–1982 | Mallaig | 1967 | Sold 1985. Renamed Gordon Cubbin. Moored by the Tees Transporter Bridge, Middlesbrough, July 2025. |
| 936 | E.M.M. Gordon Cubbin | 1957 | 1982–1985 | Relief fleet | 1967 | Sold 1985. Renamed Gordon Cubbin. Moored by the Tees Transporter Bridge, Middlesbrough, July 2025. |
| 938 | Rowland Watts | 1957 | 1957–1983 | Valentia | 1970 | (Note: Legacy of Mr Watts, built by Groves & Guttridge of Cowes, costing £38,500.) Sold 1985. Stored at Murphy Marine, Valentia Island, Ireland, June 2020. |
| 938 | Rowland Watts | 1957 | 1983–1985 | Relief fleet | 1970 | Sold 1985. Stored at Murphy Marine, Valentia Island, Ireland, June 2020. |
| 939 | Frank Spiller Locke | 1957 | 1957–1976 | Weymouth | 1966 | Sold October 1986. Unaltered, at Old Mill Boatyard, Old Mill Creek, Dartmouth, Devon, August 2025. |
| 939 | Frank Spiller Locke | 1957 | 1977–1985 | Galway Bay | 1966 | Sold October 1986. Unaltered, at Old Mill Boatyard, Old Mill Creek, Dartmouth, Devon, August 2025. |
| 943 | Claude Cecil Staniforth | 1958 | 1958–1978 | Lerwick | 1968 | (Note: Legacy of Mr Staniforth, built by Groves & Guttridge of Cowes, costing £38,500.) Sold November 1985. Renamed Lady Sarah, later Naomh Seosamh. Unaltered, at New Ross Boatyard, County Kilkenny, Ireland, September 2025 |
| 943 | Claude Cecil Staniforth | 1958 | 1978–1985 | Arranmore | 1968 | Sold November 1985. Renamed Lady Sarah, later Naomh Seosamh. Unaltered, at New Ross Boatyard, County Kilkenny, Ireland, September 2025 |
| 944 | Ramsay-Dyce | 1958 | 1958–1976 | Aberdeen | 1968 | (Note: Legacy of Mr Ramsay, built by Groves & Guttridge of Cowes, costing £38,232.) Sold August 1985. Unaltered, at Glasson Dock, Lancashire, August 2025. |
| 944 | Ramsay-Dyce | 1958 | 1976–1978 | Relief fleet | 1968 | Sold August 1985. Unaltered, at Glasson Dock, Lancashire, August 2025. |
| 944 | Ramsay-Dyce | 1958 | 1978–1985 | Lochinver | 1968 | Sold August 1985. Unaltered, at Glasson Dock, Lancashire, August 2025. |
| 945 | Princess Alexandra of Kent | 1958 | 1958–1975 | Torbay | 1968 | (Note: From RNLI funds, of Mr Ramsay, built by J. Samuel White of Cowes, costing £38,500.) Sold 1984. Renamed Princess. Lost off Crail whilst on passage to Peterhead, 1 August 2012. |
| 945 | Princess Alexandra of Kent | 1958 | 1975–1978 | Relief fleet | 1968 | Sold 1984. Renamed Princess. Lost off Crail whilst on passage to Peterhead, 1 August 2012. |
| 945 | Princess Alexandra of Kent | 1958 | 1979–1980 | Tynemouth | 1968 | Sold 1984. Renamed Princess. Lost off Crail whilst on passage to Peterhead, 1 August 2012. |
| 945 | Princess Alexandra of Kent | 1958 | 1980–1983 | Relief fleet | 1968 | Sold 1984. Renamed Princess. Lost off Crail whilst on passage to Peterhead, 1 August 2012. |
| 949 | Ethel Mary | 1959 | 1959–1985 | Ballycotton | 1974 | (Note: Funded by the trustees of the late Mrs Brereton, built by Groves & Guttridge of Cowes, costing £39,900.) Last Barnett-class lifeboat on station. Sold 1989. Renamed Helen Mary, later Catriona. In storage as Ethel Mary at Coleraine, Northern Ireland, December 2023. |
| 949 | Ethel Mary | 1959 | 1985–1987 | Relief fleet | 1974 | Last Barnett-class lifeboat on station. Sold 1989. Renamed Helen Mary, later Catriona. In storage as Ethel Mary at Coleraine, Northern Ireland, December 2023. |
| 949 | Ethel Mary | 1959 | 1987–1988 | Baltimore | 1974 | Last Barnett-class lifeboat on station. Sold 1989. Renamed Helen Mary, later Catriona. In storage as Ethel Mary at Coleraine, Northern Ireland, December 2023. |
| 952 | Duke of Cornwall (Civil Service No. 33) | 1960 | 1961–1984 | The Lizard | 1969 | (Note: Funded by the Civil Service LB fund, built by Groves & Guttridge of Cowes, costing £40,500.) Sold 1989. Unaltered condition, at Old Mill Creek, Dartmouth, Devon, July 2023. |
| 952 | Duke of Cornwall (Civil Service No. 33) | 1960 | 1984 | Padstow | 1969 | Sold 1989. Unaltered condition, at Old Mill Creek, Dartmouth, Devon, July 2023. |
| 952 | Duke of Cornwall (Civil Service No. 33) | 1960 | 1984–1989 | Relief fleet | 1969 | Sold 1989. Unaltered condition, at Old Mill Creek, Dartmouth, Devon, July 2023. |
| 956 | John and Frances MacFarlane | 1960 | 1961–1986 | Aith | 1970 | (Note: Gift of Mr J. Macfarlane and Mrs A. F. Macfarlane, built by J. Samuel White of Cowes, costing £40,000.) Sold October 1986. Unaltered condition, at St Katharine Docks, London, September 2025 |

== See also ==
- Royal National Lifeboat Institution lifeboats
