= Aith Lifeboat Station =

RNLI Lifeboat station in Scotland

- Aith Lifeboat Station in 2025

- Location within Shetland

General information
- Type: RNLI Lifeboat Station
- Location: Aith Harbour, Aith,, Bixter, Shetland, ZE2 9NB, Scotland
- Coordinates: 60°17′11.0″N 1°22′32.0″W
- Opened: 1933
- Owner: Royal National Lifeboat Institution

Website
- Aith RNLI Lifeboat Station

Aith Lifeboat Station is located at the southern end of Aith Voe, in Aith, a village on the north-west coast of the mainland of the Shetland archipelago, approximately 18 miles (29 km) from Lerwick.

A lifeboat was first stationed at Aith by the Royal National Lifeboat Institution (RNLI) in 1933. It is the most northerly of the 237 RNLI lifeboat stations.

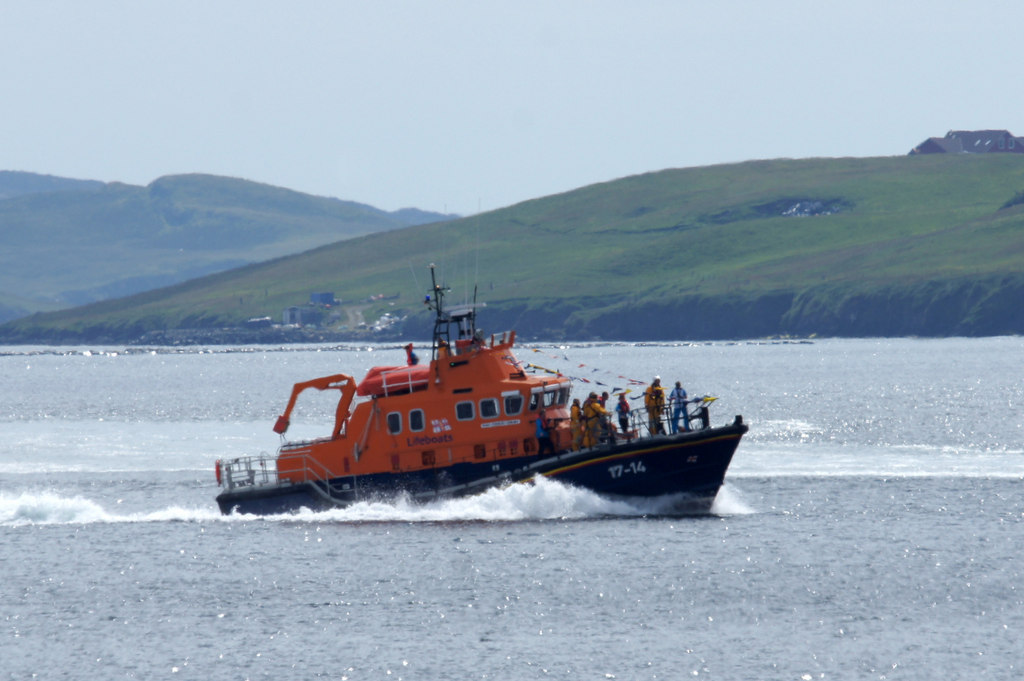
Aith Severn-class lifeboat 17-14 Charles Lidbury (ON 1232)

The station currently operates a Severn-class All-weather lifeboat, 17-14 Charles Lidbury (ON 1232), on station since 1998, only the fifth lifeboat to have served at Aith.

== History ==
Despite valiant attempts by Lerwick Life-Saving Company, and even the Stromness lifeboat, travelling from 120 miles (190 km) away, wrecks such as that of the Aberdeen fishing trawler Ben Doran in March 1930, with the loss of all nine crew, prompted the RNLI to station a lifeboat at Lerwick, and to look for a location to station a second lifeboat on the west coast of mainland Shetland.

Once reliable communications could be established, it was decided to station a boat at Aith, as the village could provide sufficient crew, and because Aith Voe was one of the most sheltered mooring locations on the west coast.

A temporary lifeboat was placed on station in January 1933, a 45-foot 6in Watson-class lifeboat, built in 1926 by S. E. Saunders of Cowes, with an 80-hp engine, delivering a speed of 8 knots (15 km/h; 9.2 mph). She had previously served for seven years at Longhope, and had been named K. T. J. S. (ON 698) in reference to her benefactors, Mr King, Mr Turnball, Mr Jesset and Mrs Sandford.

James Tait DSM was appointed Coxswain, another James Tait was appointed Second Coxswain, and William Tait was appointed Bowman. Charles Mowat, Assistant Mechanic at Lerwick, was appointed to be Aith Mechanic.

After a year, the RNLI announced that the Aith station was permanent, and a house was constructed for the mechanic. A new boat was provided to Aith, which arrived on 12 May 1935. The boat was a 51 ft (16 m) Barnett-class Stromness-type lifeboat, constructed at Groves and Guttridge, of Cowes, powered by twin 60-hp engines, delivering 9 knots (17 km/h; 10 mph), with a range of 180 miles (290 km), and costing just over £9,000.

The lifeboat was the gift of Miss Maggie Rankin of Glasgow, in memory of her brothers, John Finlay Rankin and Matthew Rankin, of Rankin & Blackmore, marine engineers, of Greenock. At a ceremony on 5 September 1935, attended by over 500 people, the lifeboat was formally handed to the local branch of the RNLI, and named The Rankin (ON 776). In 25 years of service, The Rankin was launched 52 times, and saved 61 lives.

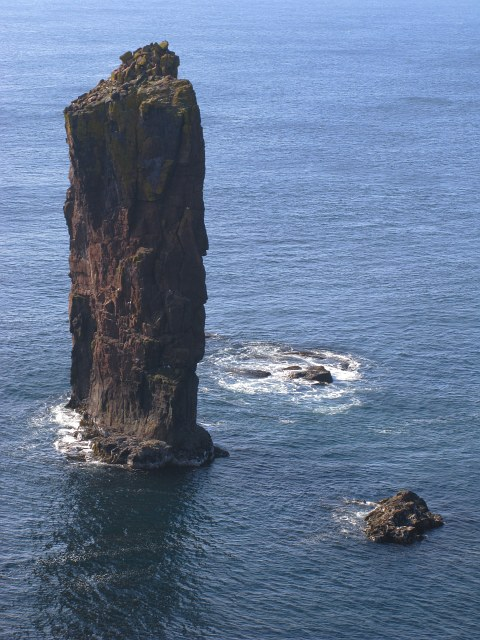
Snolda Sea Stack, Papa Stour

Just before 06:00 on the morning of 19 February 1967, the 52-foot Barnett lifeboat James and Frances Macfarlane (ON 956) was launched to the aid of the Aberdeen trawler Juniper, which had run aground in Lyra Sound, between Lyra Skerry and the west side of Papa Stour. Considerable skill, navigation and seamanship in force 8 conditions was required to bring the lifeboat to the side of Juniper, and to effect the rescue of the 12 crew. The lifeboat, crew and survivors landed in Aith at 09:35.

For this service, Coxswain John R. Nicholson was awarded the RNLI Silver Medal, the rest of the crew being accorded "The Thanks of the Institution inscribed on Vellum". Coxswain Nicholson would later receive the 1967 "Maud Smith Award".

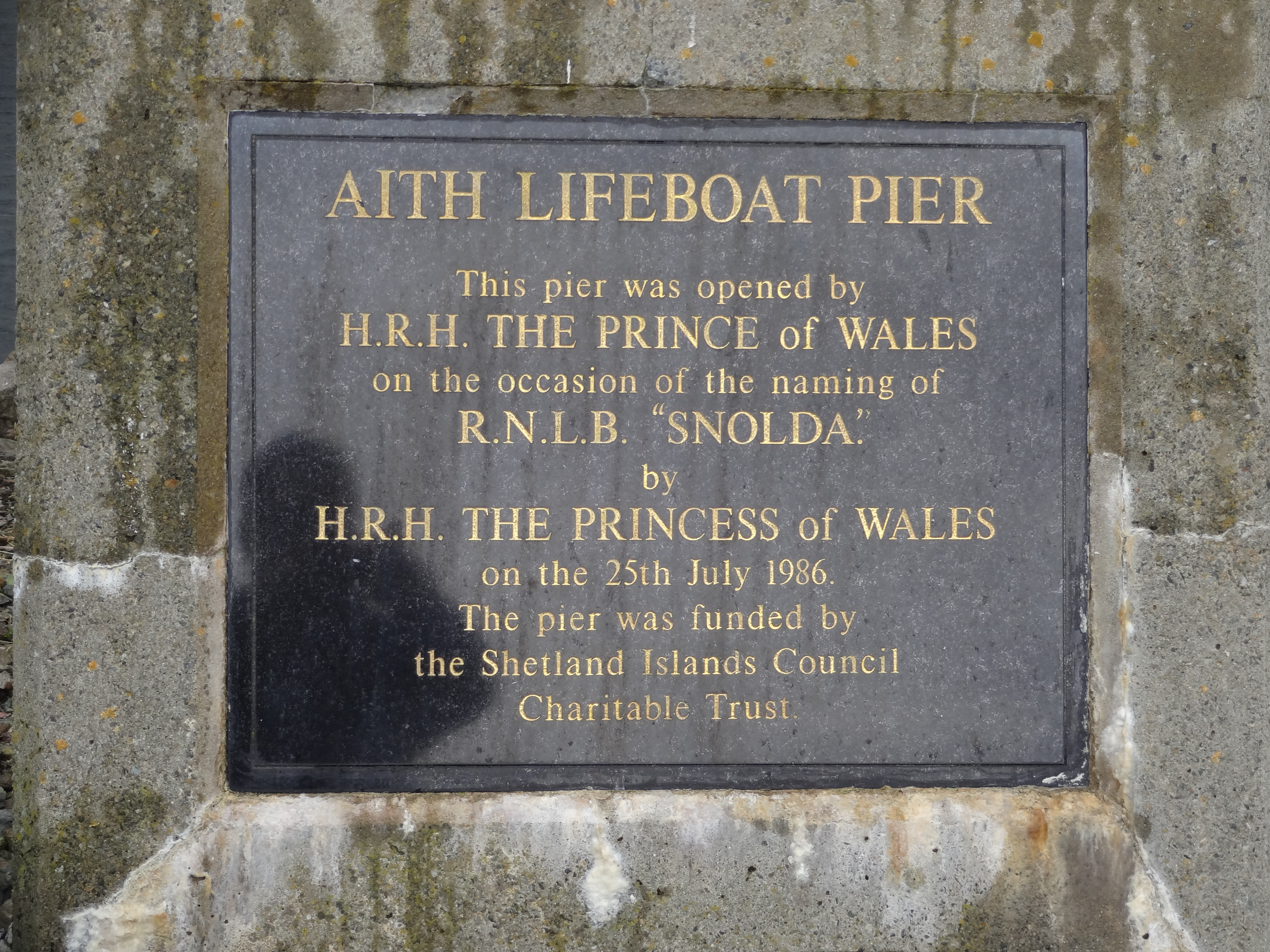
Aith Pier Plaque

At a ceremony on 25 July 1986, Aith were hosts to Charles, Prince of Wales and Diana, Princess of Wales, for the official opening of the new lifeboat pier, which had been constructed at a cost of £750,000, and the naming ceremony of the new Aith lifeboat. Music was provided by Lerwick Brass Band, and vessels in attendance included the tugboat Lyrie, with its fire hoses firing water in the air, and the Norwegian lifeboat Skomvær III. A granite plaque marking the opening of the pier was unveiled by the Prince. Afterwards, the new 52 ft (16 m) Arun-class All-weather lifeboat was handed to the care of the local committee, and breaking a bottle of champagne over the bow, was named 52-030 Snolda (ON 1100) by the Princess, the boat named after the rock stack on Papa Stour, on which the trawler Juniper was wrecked in 1967.

Snolda would serve at Aith for just 12 years, first being transferred to the relief fleet, and later used for training. In 2007, she was sold from RNLI service, and joined the Icelandic Lifeboat Service, renamed 2743 Oddur V. Gíslason at Grindavík. She was replaced at Aith on 2 May 1998, by the Severn-class lifeboat 17-14 Charles Lidbury (ON 1232).

New shore facilities were constructed at Aith in 2003, at a cost of £321,721.

== Station honours ==
The following are awards made at Aith:

- RNLI Silver Medal
  John R. Nicholson, Coxswain – 1967
- The Maud Smith Award 1967
  (for the bravest act of lifesaving during the year by a member of a lifeboat crew)
  John R. Nicholson, Coxswain – 1968
- 'The Thanks of the Institution inscribed on Vellum'
  Andrew Smith, Acting Second Coxswain – 1968
  James Mason, Acting Bowman – 1968
  Frank Johnston, Motor Mechanic – 1968
  Wilbert Clark, Acting Assistant Mechanic – 1968
  William Anderson, crew member – 1968
  Kenneth Henry, crew member – 1968
  A. James Tait, crew member – 1968
  Hylton Henry, Coxswain – 1996
- Vellum Service Certificates
  Ian Anderson, Deputy Second Coxswain – 1996
  Kevin Henry, Mechanic – 1996
  George Johnston, crew member – 1996
  Ivor Moffat, crew member – 1996
  Angus Ridland, crew member – 1996
  Andrew Tait, crew member – 1996
- 'A Framed Letter of Thanks signed by the Chairman of the Institution'
  Hylton Henry, Coxswain – 1996
- Special Commendation from the RNLI Chief Executive
  John Robertson, Coxswain – 2021
  Robbie Abernethy, Mechanic – 2021
  Lewis Fraser, crew member – 2021
  Luke Bullough, crew member – 2021
  Nick McCaffrey, crew member – 2021
  Ivor Moffat, crew member – 2021
- British Empire Medal
  Kenneth Hylton Henry – 1991NYH

== Aith lifeboats ==
=== All-weather lifeboats ===
ON (Note: ON is the RNLI's Official Number of the boat.)	Op.No. (Note: Op.No. is the RNLI's Operational Number of the boat carried on the hull.)	Name	Built	On station	Class	Comments
698	−	K. T. J. S.	1926	1933−1935	45-foot 6in Watson	(Note: Named after the four benefactors, Mr King, Mr Turnball, Mr Jesset and Mrs Sandford.); Previously at Longhope. Transferred to Arranmore.
776	−	The Rankin	1935	1935−1961	51-foot Barnett	
956	−	John and Frances Macfarlane	1960	1961−1986	52-foot Barnett (Mk. II)	
1100	52-030	Snolda	1986	1986−1998	Arun	
1232	17-14	Charles Lidbury	1998	1998−	Severn	

More post-service details can be found on the respective lifeboat class pages.

== See also ==
- List of RNLI stations
- List of former RNLI stations
- Royal National Lifeboat Institution lifeboats
