= James Rennie Barnett =

Scottish naval architect (b. 1864, d. 1965)

- Born: 6 September 1864; Johnstone
- Died: 13 January 1965 (aged 100); Glasgow
- Occupation: Architect
- Practice: G.L. Watson & Co.

James Rennie Barnett OBE (6 September 1864 – 13 January 1965) was a Scottish naval architect.

== Early life ==
Barnett was born in Johnstone, son of Janet Barnett and James Barnett, a bookkeeper.

== Career ==
At age 16, Barnett became an apprentice in the drawing office of G.L. Watson & Co. and remained for seven years. During this time, Barnett completed a degree in Naval Architecture at the University of Glasgow. Barnett received first prize in the Buoyancy and Stability of Ships Class. In 1896, he received the South Kensington first Class Honours Certificate and Medal for Naval Architecture. In 1888, Barnett joined William Doxford & Sons as a Draughtsman, leaving in 1889 to return to G.L. Watson & Co. as Chief Draughtsman. Barnett succeeded George Lennox Watson as Managing Partner of G.L. Watson & Co. in 1904 and retired in 1954 after more than 50 years of service. During his time at the firm, Barnett designed over 400 yachts, lifeboats and commercial vessels including:

- Liberty (1908)
- Sunbeam II (1929)
- Taransay (1930)
- Virginia (1930)
- Nahlin (1930)
- Mercator (1932)
- Titan (1935)
- Blue Bird (1938)
- Barnett-class lifeboat

=== Lifeboat design ===
Barnett succeeded Watson as Consulting Naval Architect to the RNLI in 1904 and held the position until 1947. Barnett brought about many changes in lifeboat design including increased efficiency and better operational stability. Notably, he developed the world's first self-righting lifeboat and the Barnett-class lifeboat. His book, Modern Motor Lifeboats is considered to be the standard work on the subject.

== Honours ==
- Order of the British Empire (OBE), 1918.
- RNLI Gold Medal, 1947.

== Legacy ==
Barnett died in 1965 at age 100.

== Selected works ==
Books

- Modern Motor Lifeboats, Blackie & Son Ltd, 1933.

Articles

- "Typical Forms of Racing Yachts", Transactions of the Institute of Engineers & Shipbuilders, 1900.
- "Steam Yachts: some comparisons", Transactions of the Royal Institute of Naval Architects, 1906.
- "Motor Lifeboats of the RNLI", Transactions of the Royal Institute of Naval Architects, 1910.
- "Recent Developments in Motor Lifeboats", Transactions of the Royal Institution of Naval Architects, 1922.
- "Motor Yachts", Transactions of the Institution of Engineers and Shipbuilders, 1931.

== Bibliography ==
- Daylan, L.; McNeil, I. (2002). Biographical Dictionary of the History of Technology. Routledge.
- Fry, E.C. (1975). Life-boat Design & Development. David & Charles Press.
- Barnett, J.R. (1933). Modern Motor Lifeboats. Blackie & Son Ltd.
