= Valentia Lifeboat Station =

RNLI lifeboat station in County Kerry, Ireland

- Valentia Lifeboat Station in 2026

- Location within Ireland

General information
- Type: RNLI Lifeboat Station
- Location: Knightstown, Valentia Island, County Kerry, Ireland
- Coordinates: 51°55′37.1″N 10°17′17.6″W
- Opened: 1864–1896; 1946–present
- Owner: Royal National Lifeboat Institution

Website
- Valentia RNLI Lifeboat Station

Valentia Lifeboat Station is located adjacent to the Watch House Cottages at Knightstown, a village at the eastern tip of Valentia Island, County Kerry, in the south-west corner of Ireland.

A lifeboat was first stationed at Reenard Point on the mainland in 1864 by the Royal National Lifeboat Institution (RNLI).

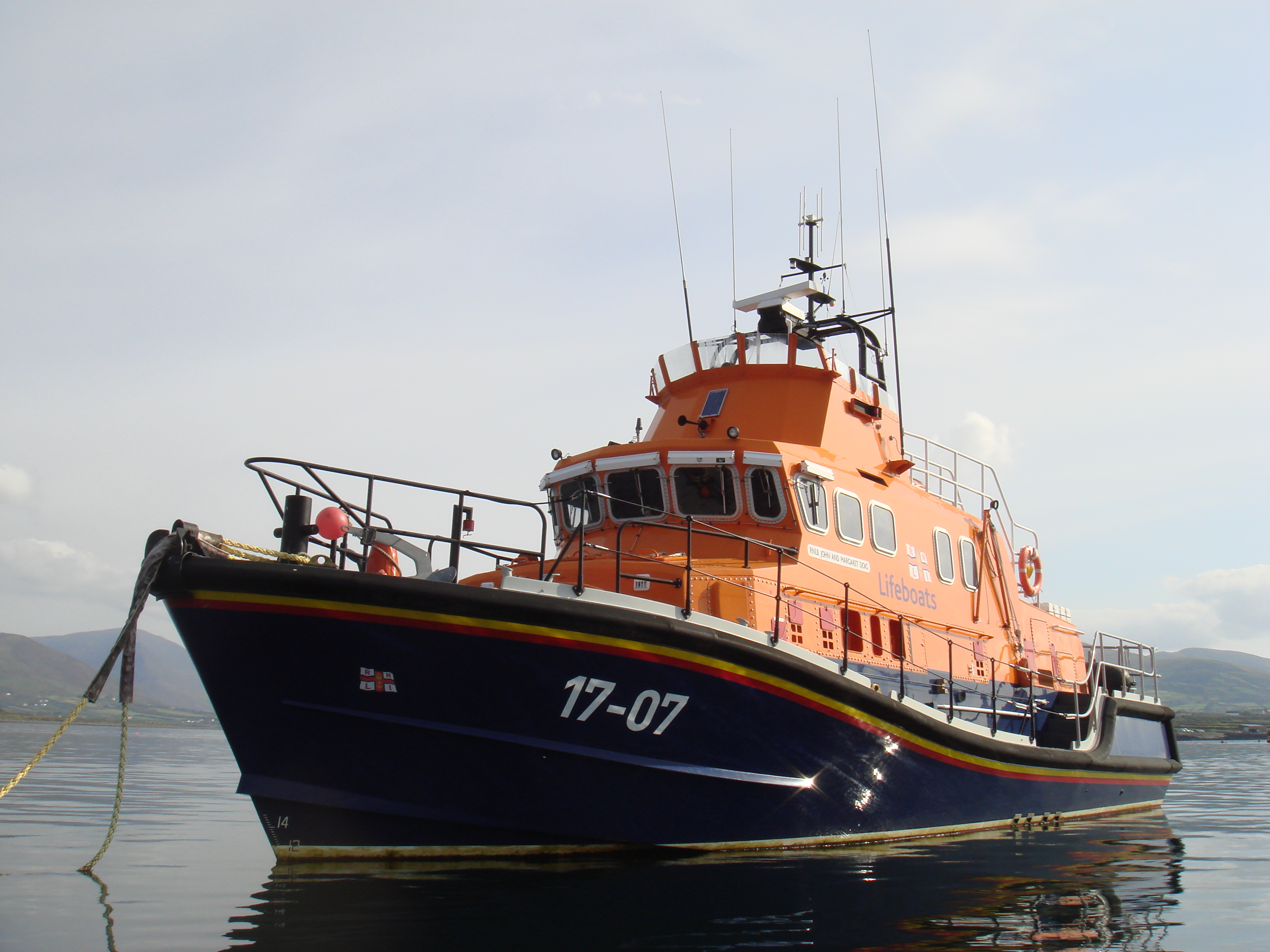
Severn-class All-weather lifeboat 17-07 John and Margaret Doig (ON 1218)

The station currently operates a Severn-class All-weather lifeboat, 17-07 John and Margaret Doig (ON 1218), on station since 1996.

== History ==
Ever since its founding in 1824, the Royal National Institution for the Preservation of Life from Shipwreck (RNIPLS), later to become the RNLI in 1854, would award medals for deeds of gallantry at sea, even if no lifeboats were involved.

On 7 December 1828, the brig Veronica of Belfast was driven onto a sand bar in Dingle Bay and wrecked, leaving the crew and one passenger clinging to the rigging. 5 coastguard boatmen put out in a 4-oared gig, and managed to rescue all 18 people on board. On the journey ashore, which took over two hours, the gig was upset, and all 23 people were recovered from the surf. The five coastguard boatmen were each awarded the RNIPLS Silver Medal.

In 1861, Chief Boatman Hugh Cooper at Dingle Bay Coastguard would receive the RNLI Silver Medal, for his part in the rescue of two people from the wreck of the barque Florence of Liverpool on 24 January.

In 1864, the RNLI commissioned a lifeboat house to be constructed on the mainland at Reenard Point, facing the island of Valentia, at a cost of £155. A 32-foot self-righting 'Pulling and Sailing' (P&S) lifeboat, one with sails and (10) oars, costing £223, and a transporting carriage, which cost a further £96, were dispatched to the station, transported free of charge between London and Tralee by the London and Limerick Steam Ship Company. "The boat will not only be available for any vessels getting ashore off the entrance to Valentia Harbour, but she can also be transported overland by good roads to Dingle, and Ballinskelligs Bay, north and south of the island".

The lifeboat was funded by a 'Lady' of Berkshire, with a gift of £508 to defray the whole cost of the station. The same lady had previously funded a lifeboat on the north-west coast of England. At her request, the lifeboat was named Mary.

The lifeboat was relocated onto Valentia Island in 1869, with the boathouse moved at a cost of £70.

At the September 1879 meeting of the RNLI committee of management, it was noted that £500 had been received from the (late) Mr Crosby Leonard, MRCS FRCS(Ed) of Clifton, Bristol for a lifeboat to bear his name. The funds were appropriated to Valentia, and in 1880, the Mary was renamed the Crosby Leonard.

A new 33 ft 7 in (10.24 m) self-righting lifeboat was placed at Valentia in 1890. It also took the name Crosby Leonard (ON 174). The lifeboat and carriage were transported by rail to Killorglin, where it is reported that a rail employee was killed during the unloading process. From there, the lifeboat crew rowed and sailed the boat the 64 km (40 mi) to the Valentia lifeboat station, with the carriage going by road. However, just over five years later, at a meeting of the RNLI committee of management on 14 November 1895, it was decided to discontinue Valentia Lifeboat Station.

== 1939 onwards ==
Between 1939 and 1945, an auxiliary rescue boat had been stationed at Valentia to help aircraft personnel flying in from the Atlantic during the Second World War. After the war, the RNLI reopened the station in 1946.

On 2 September 1963, after seeing a small dinghy capsize in poor conditions, Motor Mechanic John Joseph Houlihan set off single-handed in the Valentia station boarding boat to the aid of the dinghy. Arriving to find two men in the water, one was dragged aboard, and one was left holding the transom. With some difficulty, he brought the two men to shore. For this service, John Joseph Houlihan was awarded the RNLI Bronze Medal and "The Maud Smith award for Gallantry 1963".

New station opening plaque and memorial

At 18:05 on 20 February 1970, Valentia's Barnett-class lifeboat Roland Watts (ON 938) was called to the aid of MV Oranmore, with engine failure, 15 km (9.3 mi) NNW of Braddon Head, County Kerry, some 68 km (42 mi) away. The lifeboat arrived on scene at 23:15, standing off in rough seas for two hours until it was decided that three crew be taken off. Eventually, the decision was taken to abandon ship, and the lifeboat rescued a further seven men. The body of the Mate was also brought ashore. He had fallen into the sea during the rescue, but died after being recovered to the boat. A rope had fouled the port engine during the rescue, so the lifeboat made for Kilrush and arrived at 06:15, after just over 12 hours on service. For this service, Coxswain Dermot Walsh was awarded the RNLI Silver Medal.

On 23 June 1985, Air India Flight 182, a Boeing 747-237B VT-EFO, en route from Montreal to London, exploded at 31,000 feet (9,400 m) from a terrorist bomb, when it was 190 kilometres (120 mi) off Ireland, killing all 329 passengers and crew. Valentia lifeboat crew participated in the recovery of bodies from the worst aviation disaster in Irish territory. A "Framed letter of Thanks signed by the Chairman of the Institution" was presented to the Coxswain and crew.

A new boathouse was constructed in 1995, and the following year, the station received 17-07 John and Margaret Doig (ON 1218), a Severn-class lifeboat, becoming one of the 35 RNLI stations around the British Isles to operate the RNLI's largest lifeboat.

== Station honours ==
The following are awards made at Valentia:

- RNIPLS Silver Medal
  Nicholas Hanning, Boatman, H.M. Coastguard, Minard – 1828
  Richard Jeffers, Boatman, H.M. Coastguard, Minard – 1828
  William Mark, Boatman, H.M. Coastguard, Minard – 1828
  Joseph Ronowden, Boatman, H.M. Coastguard, Minard – 1828
  William Rowe, Boatman, H.M. Coastguard, Minard – 1828
- RNLI Silver Medal
  Hugh Cooper, Chief Boatman, H.M. Coastguard, Dingle Bay – 1861
  Dermot Walsh, Coxswain – 1970
- RNLI Bronze Medal
  John Joseph Houlihan, Motor Mechanic – 1963
- The Maud Smith Award 1963
  (for the bravest act of lifesaving during the year by a member of a lifeboat crew)
  John Joseph Houlihan – 1964
- 'The Thanks of the Institution inscribed on Vellum'
  P. Murphy, Bowman – 1970
  J. Curtin, crew member – 1970
  J. Curran, crew members – 1970
  N. Murphy, crew member – 1970
  John Joseph Houlihan, Motor Mechanic – 1983
- 'A Framed letter of Thanks signed by the Chairman of the Institution'
  The Coxswain and Crew – 1985
  Seanie Murphy, Coxswain – 1989
  Seanie Murphy, Coxswain – 1997

== Valentia lifeboats ==
=== Pulling and Sailing (P&S) lifeboats ===
ON (Note: ON is the RNLI's Official Number of the boat.)	Name	Built	On station	Class	Comments
Pre-424	Mary	1864	1864–1880	32-foot Prowse self-righting (P&S)	(Note: 32 ft 0 in (9.75 m) x 7 ft 4 in (2.24 m) (10-oared) Prowse-class self-righting (P&S) lifeboat, gift of Miss M. Wasey of Newbury, Berkshire, built by Forrestt of Limehouse, London, costing £223.); Renamed Crosby Leonard in 1880.
Pre-424	Crosby Leonard	1864	1880–1890	32-foot Prowse self-righting (P&S)	(Note: Legacy of Mr C. Leonard of Bristol.); Sold in 1890 to be a cattleboat.
174	Crosby Leonard	1889	1890–1896	34-foot self-righting (P&S)	(Note: 34 ft 0 in (10.36 m) x 7 ft 6 in (2.29 m) (10-oared) self-righting (P&S) lifeboat, legacy of Mr C. Leonard of Bristol, built by Willans and Robinson of Thames Ditton, costing £352.); Broken up in 1896.

Station closed 1896–1946
Pre ON numbers are unofficial numbers used by the Lifeboat Enthusiasts' Society to reference early lifeboats not included on the official RNLI list.

=== Motor lifeboats ===
ON	Op.No. (Note: Op.No. is the RNLI's Operational Number of the boat carried on the hull.)	Name	Built	On station	Class	Comments
690	–	C. & S.	1925	1946–1947	45-foot Watson	Previously at Dunmore East and Pwllheli.
687	–	B. A. S. P.	1924	1947–1951	45-foot Watson	Previously at Yarmouth and Falmouth.
717	–	A. E. D.	1929	1951–1957	51-foot Barnett	Previously at Holyhead.
938	–	Roland Watts	1957	1957–1983	52-foot Barnett (Mk.II)	
1082	52-23	Margaret Frances Love	1982	1983–1996	Arun	Transferred to Barry Dock
1218	17-07	John and Margaret Doig	1996	1996–	Severn	

== See also ==
- List of RNLI stations
- List of former RNLI stations
- Royal National Lifeboat Institution lifeboats

== Sources ==
- Leonard, Richie; Denton, Tony (2025). Lifeboat Enthusiasts Handbook 2025. Lifeboats Enthusiasts' Society.
- Leonard, Richie; Denton, Tony (2026). Lifeboat Enthusiasts Handbook 2026. Lifeboats Enthusiasts' Society.

== Bibliography ==
- Robinson, Richard. Valentia Lifeboats: A History. History Press Limited, 2011. ISBN 1845887077
