= Thames-class lifeboat =

Former RNLI lifeboat class

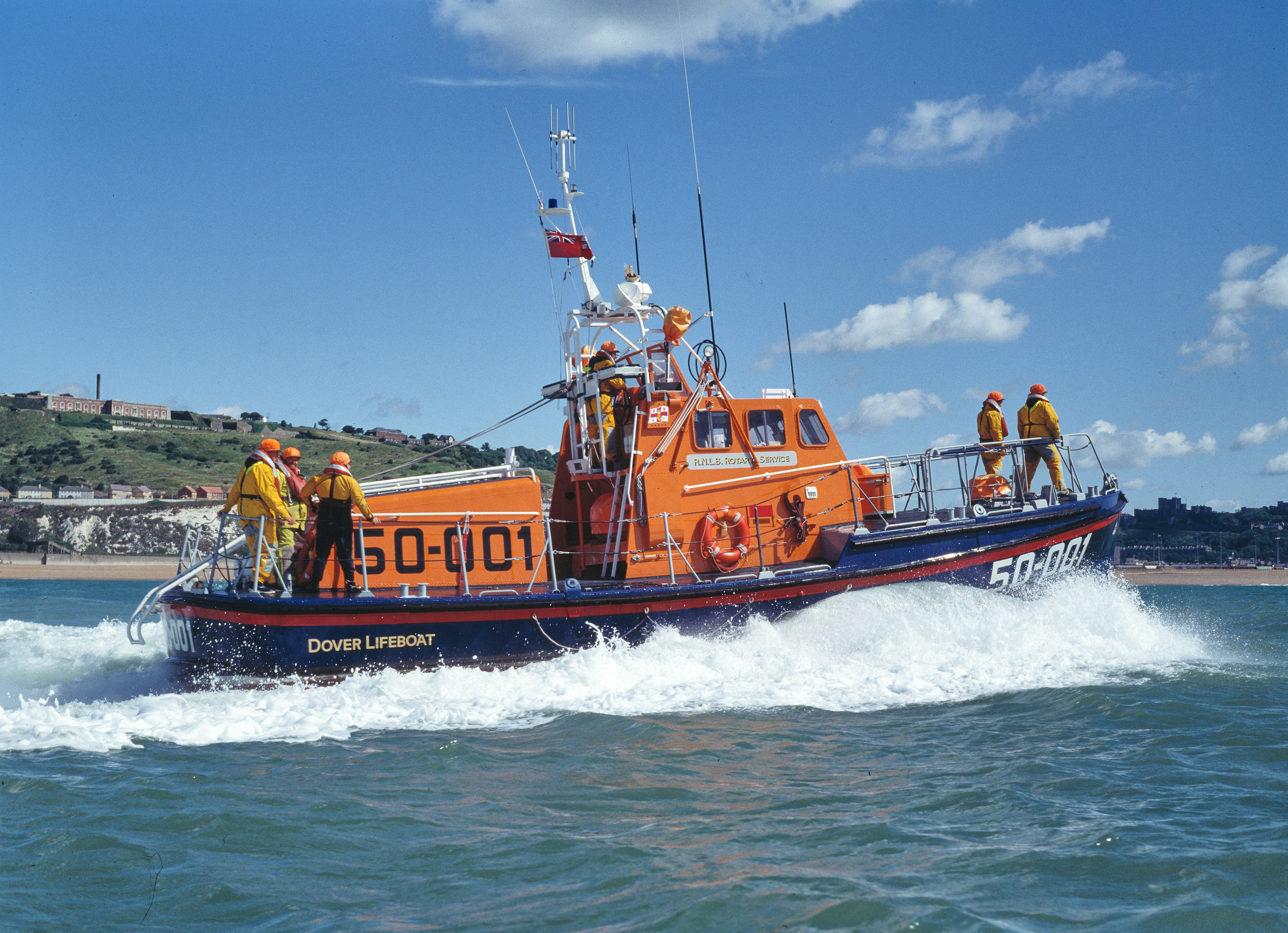
- RNLB 50-001 Rotary Service (ON 1031) at Dover. Photo: Mike Louagie

Class overview
- Builders: Brooke Marine, Lowestoft
- Operators: Royal National Lifeboat Institution
- Preceded by: Barnett-class
- Succeeded by: Arun-class
- Built: 1973–1974
- In service: 1974–1997
- Planned: 6
- Completed: 2
- Canceled: 4
- Active: 0
- Retired: 2

General characteristics
- Type: Motor lifeboat
- Displacement: 24–27 tons
- Length: 50 ft (15 m)
- Beam: 14 ft 6 in (4.42 m)
- Propulsion: 2 × 390 bhp (290 kW) General Motors 8V71T; V-8 diesel
- Speed: 17.5 knots (20.1 mph)
- Range: 210 nautical miles (390 km)
- Crew: 6

The Thames-class lifeboat was operated by the Royal National Lifeboat Institution (RNLI) from just three stations around the coast of the United Kingdom, between 1974 and 1997. Six were ordered but only two were completed. In line with the usual RNLI lifeboat naming convention since the 1960s, the class takes its name from a river, in this case, the River Thames, which flows through London and into the North Sea.

== History ==
In the 1960s, the RNLI's fleet consisted of motor lifeboats of limited speed, usually around 7–8 kn (13–15 km/h; 8.1–9.2 mph), due to the shape of their hull. The United States Coast Guard (USCG) had developed a faster 44-foot motor lifeboat, which planed across the water with a reduced contact area and was therefore much faster. The RNLI obtained one in 1964, which led to the introduction of the 44-foot-10-inch (13.67 m) Waveney-class lifeboat in 1967.

The RNLI's naval architects then designed a larger version, with a longer hull and a bow of different shape. Six boats were ordered, four from Brooke Marine in Lowestoft, and two from Richard Dunston of Hessle, East Riding of Yorkshire.

There was one prototype made, Gore Point. It was sold to serve as a pilot boat at King's Lynn, and later sold to operate at Fowey, based at Polruan. In 1998, Gore Point was replaced by 50-001 Rotary Service when she retired from RNLI service.

== Original Specifications ==
The original design specifications: Length: 48 ft 6 in (14.78 m), Speed: 18 kn (33 km/h; 21 mph), Range: 100 nmi (190 km; 120 mi), Crew: 5, Self-righting: Yes, Equipment: RNLI standards.

The boat was designed by the Institution staff. Testing of the design was undertaken at East Cowes by the British Hovercraft Corporation. The hull was constructed of 3/16 inch Corten steel, double-bottomed from the forepeak, to the aft end of the engine room. The watertight welded aluminium wheelhouse contains all instruments, controls and electronic equipment, with self-righting capability dependent on the water-tight integrity of the superstructure. The desk was aluminium plate, with anti-slip paint.

Twin main engines were General Motors (Detroit) 8V-71 9.3 L (570 cu in) V8 diesel, each developing 390-shp at 2,300 rpm, fitted with Allison hydraulically operated reverse reduction gearboxes. Electronic equipment included: Ferrograph echo sounder, Pye Westminster VHP radio transmitter and receiver, Kelvin Hughes Falkland MF radio telephone, Kelvin Hughes type 17 W Radar, Decca Navigation Mk. 21, and a 5-station Easco Intercom.

== Cancellation ==
Even as early as 1974, the Thames-class lifeboat project was being scaled back. Initial trials highlighted problems, particularly with 'wetness' (the amount of water thrown back up over the boat), and heavy slamming when over 13.5 knots. Permission to progress with the order for four further boats, made in January 1973, was not given.

The project was cancelled after just two of the Brooke Marine boats had been built. Cancellation charges were paid, as both boatbuilders had already ordered the necessary materials. Instead, the alternative Arun-class lifeboat, which had first launched in 1971, went into full production. The cancelled boats were to have been (ON 1038) to (ON 1041), Op.No. 50-003 to 50-006. These Official Numbers and Operational Numbers were not reallocated.

== Fleet ==
=== RNLB 50-001 Rotary Service (ON 1031) ===
The prototype Thames-class lifeboat, Operational Number 50-001, Official Number (ON 1031), was built by Brooke Marine, of Lowestoft, at a cost of £199,041, and launched in 1973. She was presented to the press on 4 May 1973, during self-righting trials.

In May 1974, Rotary Service was dispatched to St Peter Port in Guernsey, for side-by-side trials with the new Arun-class lifeboat 52-02 Sir William Arnold (ON 1025). Four days of testing took place in varying sea states, with trials officer Capt. Roy Harding taking alternating command of each boat for comparison. Six trial runs took place around an octagonal course. Each boat took a parallel path, at around 17 kn (31 km/h; 20 mph), the fastest speed of the slower boat, in order to encounter the same conditions at the same time.

During July and August 1974, Rotary Service was presented at the International Lifeboat Exhibition in Plymouth. A total of 11 lifeboats attended the event, including five examples of new RNLI lifeboats – Clyde, Arun, Waveney, Rother and Thames.

Rotary Service entered service on 1 December 1974, 'temporarily' assigned to Falmouth, awaiting delivery of their permanent station boat (50-002). She would remain on station until 8 June 1979. During this time, she was launched on 45 service calls, and saved 17 lives.

On 28 November 1977, Coxswain Arthur West was awarded the RNLI Bronze Medal for his outstanding seamanship and tremendous courage, in saving six men from a storm-lashed 110 by 70 feet (34,000 by 21,000 mm) barge.

In 1979, the boat was reallocated to Dover, arriving on station on 2 October. Remarkably, in her 5 years on service, the boat had never been formally named. At a service of dedication, led by the Bishop of Dover, and naming ceremony, held on 30 October 1979, the gift of 58,000 Great Britain and Ireland members of Rotary International was officially recognised. Under the shelter of an umbrella, Patron of the RNLI, and recently appointed Lord Warden of the Cinque Ports, Queen Elizabeth the Queen Mother formally named the lifeboat Rotary Service.

A further medal service took place on 16 October 1987. Acting Coxswain Roy Couzens was awarded the RNLI Silver Medal, with the RNLI Bronze Medal awarded to the six lifeboat crew. The vessel Sumnia had been pinned against the Admiralty Pier, with two crew members washed overboard. In south-south-westerly hurricane conditions, three men were rescued. In the violent sea-state, Couzens was thrown heavily against the steering controls. He collapsed, and was later found to have suffered a heart attack.

Rotary Service was on station at Dover for the next 18 years, finally being withdrawn to the Relief fleet on 15 March 1997, replaced with the brand new Severn-class lifeboat, 17-09 City of London II (ON 1220). During this period, she had launched 454 times, saving the lives of 200 people.

After a few months in the Relief fleet, Rotary Service was withdrawn from RNLI service. She was sold to be Pilot boat Treffry at Fowey, arriving there on 17 July 1998, and replacing the prototype boat Gore Point. By December 2006, she was operating as a Pilot boat out of Castletownbere.

In 2015, the Thames Class Lifeboat Trust (later renamed the 50001 Youth Training Trust) purchased Treffry with a view to full restoration as Rotary Service, for use as a training vessel. The Lowestoft-based charity aimed to teach young and disadvantaged individuals seamanship skills, to give them the confidence to take jobs in the maritime sector.

After struggling for funding for 10 years, the project was finally abandoned. Rotary Service was broken up in February 2025.

=== RNLB 50-002 Elizabeth Ann (ON 1032) ===
The Thames-class lifeboat, Operational Number 50-002, Official Number (ON 1032), was built in 1976 by Brooke Marine, of Lowestoft, at a cost of £200,000.

It had been intended that 50-002 would become the permanent Falmouth lifeboat, and was provisionally named Elizabeth Ann. Funding was in place, via the gift of the 'John Slater Federation', the 'Sir Kirby Laing Foundation', the 'Cornish Lifeboat Appeal', and two anonymous donors.

The main improvements to the second boat, were a bow modification, which reduced 'wetness', and a better layout for the crew cabin, which had been found to be cramped on 50-001. The boat was fitted with various experimental bow attachments constructed from GRP, to evaluate different designs, which was replaced with a steel construction before entering service. The lifeboat was also sent out to St Peter Port in Guernsey, again for side-by-side trials with the Arun-class lifeboat 52-02 Sir William Arnold (ON 1025).

In August 1978, it was decided to assign 50-002 to Islay, the southernmost island of the Inner Hebrides. Funding was already in place, via Mr Bruno Schroder and the Schroder Charity Trust, and the boat was renamed Helmut Schroder of Dunlossit.

The 52 ft (16 m) Arun-class lifeboat 52-11 Elizabeth Ann (ON 1058) took up service at Falmouth in 1979.

=== RNLB 50-002 Helmut Schroder of Dunlossit (ON 1032) ===
Before taking up station at Islay, Helmut Schroder of Dunlossit was exhibited at the International Boat Show in September 1978, taking part in a demonstration with a helicopter on 23 September.

Helmut Schroder of Dunlossit embarked on her passage from Poole to her new home at Islay on 24 April 1979, arriving 4 days later. On Saturday 28 July 1979, an estimated crowd of 1000 islanders, visitors and guests gathered at the harbour in Port Askaig for the naming ceremony of the lifeboat. Following the National Anthem in Gaelic, a service of dedication was held by the Parish Minister, the Reverend Ian R. Munro. Breaking a bottle of champagne over the boat, Mrs George Mallinckrodt, daughter of the late Helmut Schroder, named the lifeboat 50-002 Helmut Schroder of Dunlossit (ON 1032).

Just less than four months later, on Sunday 18 November 1979, both the Islay lifeboat, 50-002 Helmut Schroder of Dunlossit (ON 1032), and the Barra Island lifeboat, R. A. Colby Cubbon No.3 (ON 935), were launched just after midnight, to the aid of the Danish coaster Lone Dania. In terrible conditions, from strong gale, force 9, to violent storm and hurricane, force 11 to 12, and gusts of wind up to 65 knots, both lifeboats capsized. Both boats self-righted, but the Barra Island lifeboat suffered more damage, and required a tow back to port. The Islay boat made port under her own power. Coxswain Alastair Campbell of the Islay lifeboat later said they were the worst conditions he had encountered in 17 years as a lifeboat man, and in his previous career as a merchant seaman.

After 18 years on station at Islay, 50-002 was withdrawn from service in March 1997, returning to Poole, where for a short time, she was used for training. On 18 August 1998, the boat was moved to Tilbury Docks, and on 28 August, set off as cargo to her new home in New Zealand, for further use as a lifeboat with the Sumner Lifeboat Institution inc. With transportation costs absorbed by the shipping company, she was renamed P&O Nedlloyd Rescue. Finally sold from service in 2010, the boat was acquired by the Lyttelton Port Company Ltd for use as a work boat and relief pilot boat, LPC Rescue.

== Thames-class lifeboats ==
ON (Note: ON is the RNLI's Official Number of the boat.)	Op. No. (Note: Op. No. is the RNLI's Operational Number of the boat carried on the hull.)	Name	Built	In service	Stations	Comments
1031	50-001	Rotary Service	1973	1974–1979	Falmouth	(Note: Gift of Rotary International of Gt. Britain and Ireland, plus legacies of Mr D. I. Craig, Miss Mary Ann Redgate and Miss Mary Conbrough Fowkes, built by Brooke Marine of Lowestoft, costing £199,041.) Sold 1998. Renamed Treffry, Pilot boat at Fowey, later Castletownbere.
1031	50-001	Rotary Service	1973	1979–1997	Dover	Sold 1998. Renamed Treffry, Pilot boat at Fowey, later Castletownbere.
1031	50-001	Rotary Service	1973	1997–1998	Relief fleet	Sold 1998. Renamed Treffry, Pilot boat at Fowey, later Castletownbere.
1031	–	Treffry	1973	1998–2006	Fowey Pilot Boat	Sold 2015. Acquired by the 'Thames Class Lifeboat Trust' for restoration and training use. After the project failed, the boat was broken up, February 2025.
1031	–	Treffry	1973	2006–2015	Castletownbere Pilot Boat	Sold 2015. Acquired by the 'Thames Class Lifeboat Trust' for restoration and training use. After the project failed, the boat was broken up, February 2025.
1032	50-002	Elizabeth Ann	1976	1976–1978	Trials	(Note: Built by Brooke Marine of Lowestoft, costing £200,000.)
1032	50-002	Helmut Schroder of Dunlossit	1976	1978–1979	Trials	(Note: Gift of Mr B. Schroder and the Schroder Charity Trust) Sold 1998 to Sumner Lifeboat Institution, Lyttelton Harbour, NZ.
1032	50-002	Helmut Schroder of Dunlossit	1976	1979–1997	Islay	Sold 1998 to Sumner Lifeboat Institution, Lyttelton Harbour, NZ.
1032	–	P & O Nedlloyd Rescue	1976	1998–2010	Lyttelton Harbour	Sold 2010. Now as a Pilot/Workboat LPC Rescue at Lyttelton Harbour, New Zealand, December 2025

== See also ==
- Royal National Lifeboat Institution lifeboats
