= Portrush Lifeboat Station =

RNLI lifeboat station in County Antrim, Northern Ireland

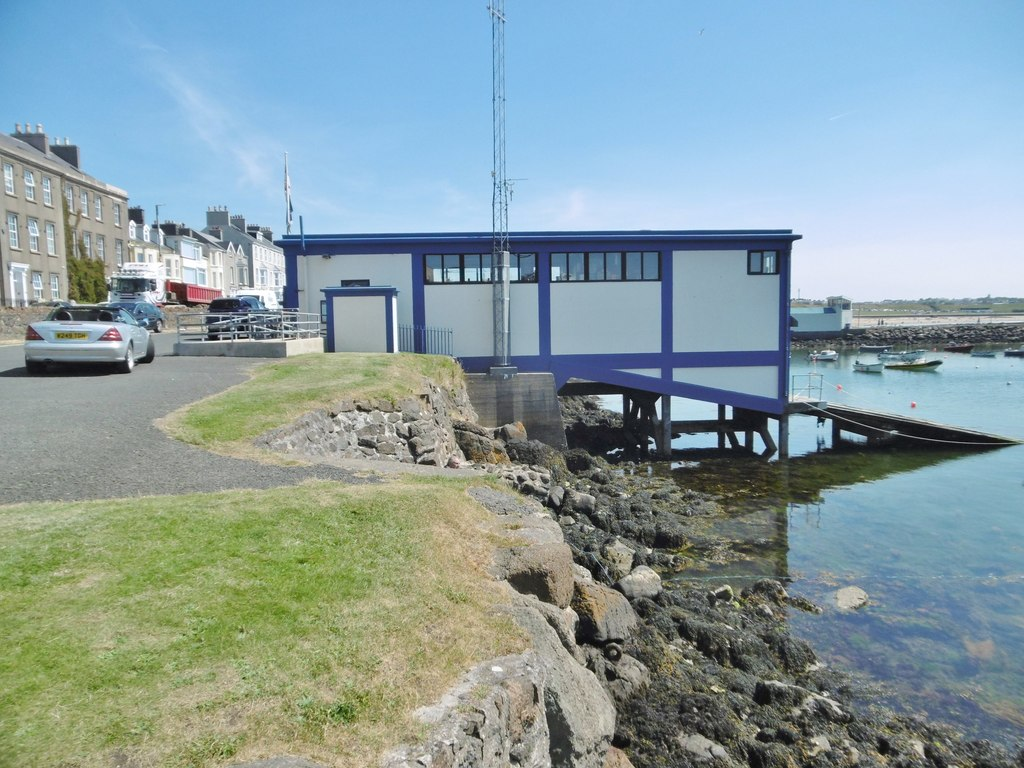
- Portrush Lifeboat Station

- Location within Northern Ireland

General information
- Type: RNLI Lifeboat Station
- Location: Lifeboat Station, Kerr St, Portrush, County Antrim, BT56 8DQ, Northern Ireland
- Coordinates: 55°12′24.5″N 6°39′24.0″W
- Opened: 26 December 1860
- Owner: Royal National Lifeboat Institution

Website
- Portrush RNLI Lifeboat Station

Portrush Lifeboat Station is situated on Kerr Street, in Portrush, a harbour town and seaside resort in County Antrim, sitting on the Ramore Head peninsula, on the northern coast of Northern Ireland.

A lifeboat station was first established at Portrush in 1860, by the Royal National Lifeboat Institution (RNLI).

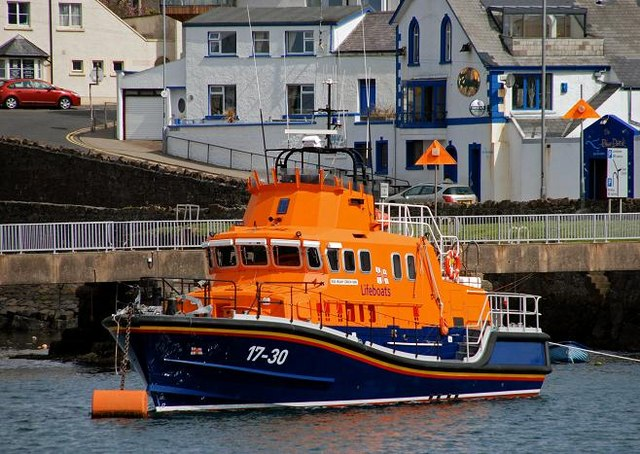
17-30 William Gordon Burr (ON 1257)

The station currently operates the Severn-class All-weather lifeboat, 17-30 William Gordon Burr (ON 1257), on station since 2008, and the smaller D-class (IB1) Inshore lifeboat, The Ken Blair (D-871), on station since 2022.

== History ==
In January 1842, three fishermen drowned, when their small boat sank off Portrush, whilst out to attend to their lines. William Richardson was instrumental in saving the life of a fourth man. The Royal National Institution for the Preservation of Life from Shipwreck (RNIPLS), later to become the RNLI in 1854, would award medals for deeds of gallantry at sea, even if no lifeboats were involved. William Richardson was awarded the RNIPLS Silver Medal.

After a campaign to have a lifeboat placed at Portrush, with Lady Laura Cecilia Parker, Countess of Antrim, playing a significant part, a branch of the RNLI was established at Portrush in 1860. A boathouse with slipway was constructed, at a cost of £140, and a 30 ft (9.1 m) self-righting 'Pulling and Sailing' (P&S) lifeboat, one with sails and (6) oars, along with its transportation carriage and equipment, arrived on station on 26 December 1860. The lifeboat was transported to Portrush free of charge by the London and Belfast Steam Packet Company. The cost of this lifeboat, and also a second lifeboat, The Good Deliverance, placed at Porthcawl, was funded by two donations of £180, by Lady Cotton-Sheppard of Crakemarsh Hall, Uttoxeter.

In 1862, a new slipway was built, after the first one was washed away. The Portrush lifeboat was initially named Zelinda. However, with Lady Cotton-Sheppard's permission, the name was changed to Laura, Countess of Antrim in 1870, in recognition of her efforts.

On the morning of 3 October 1873, in a north-west gale, the Portrush lifeboat Laura, Countess of Antrim was called to the aid of the brigantine Amanda of Coleraine. Horses from the tramway company were employed to pull the lifeboat along 2 miles (3.2 km) of soft sand, before she was launched nearer the wreck. In difficult conditions, and after two hours of hard rowing, all seven crew were brought to safety.

The lifeboat crew having expressed a requirement for a larger lifeboat, a 32 ft (9.8 m) 10-oared lifeboat was provided in 1876. The lifeboat house was rebuilt, again at a cost of £140. The lifeboat and carriage were transported from Dublin to Portrush free of charge, by the Great Northern and Belfast and Northern Counties railway companies. Funded from the legacy of the late John Whitaker of Blackheath, London, the lifeboat was named John Whitaker.

In the November 1889 edition of 'The Lifeboat', it was announced that Portrush was one of five stations that had recently received a new lifeboat, funded from legacies. The Robert and Agnes Blair (ON 158) had been funded by the late Mrs Agnes Blair of Blairmore, Argyll. On 1 November 1889, after less than one month on station, and on its first call, the Robert and Agnes Blair was launched to the aid of the French Schooner Dryad, but assistance was not required. In the poor conditions, it was decided to return to Bushfoot Strand, but part way there, the lifeboat was capsized three times, and three lifeboat men lost their lives. The lifeboat was washed up at Port Ballintrae, the rest of the crew having suffered injuries.

Less than two years later, the Robert and Agnes Blair was launched on 2 March 1891, to the aid of the schooner Ellen Myvanwy, anchored in Skerries Roads in a north-westerly gale. After several attempts to reach the vessel, the lifeboat being beaten back for two days, the three men aboard were finally rescued. Master Mariner Frederick Watt and Coxswain John Hopkins were both awarded the RNLI Silver Medal. Two lifeboat men were washed overboard during the rescue, but both were saved, crew member William McAllister awarded the RNLI silver medal for entering the sea, and swimming through the rough conditions to rescue one of the two men.

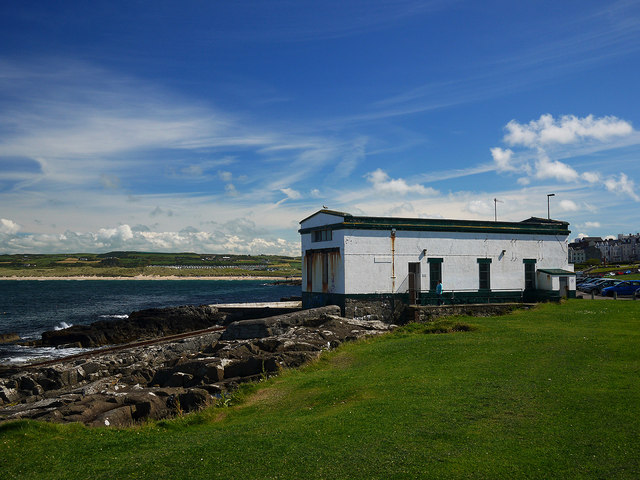
1900 Lifeboat House at Landsdowne

In 1900, it was decided to relocate the lifeboat station to the eastern side of Ramore Head. A new boathouse and slipway were constructed at Lansdowne to accommodate the new 35-foot lifeboat Hopwood (ON 494), which arrived on station in 1902.

The service life of this boathouse was relatively short, just 22 years. The Hopwood was replaced in 1924 by the first motor-powered lifeboat to be placed at Portrush, the 45-foot Watson-class lifeboat T. B. B. H. (ON 686), and another new boathouse and slipway, the fourth at Portrush, was constructed in 1928, the lifeboat launching directly into the harbour.

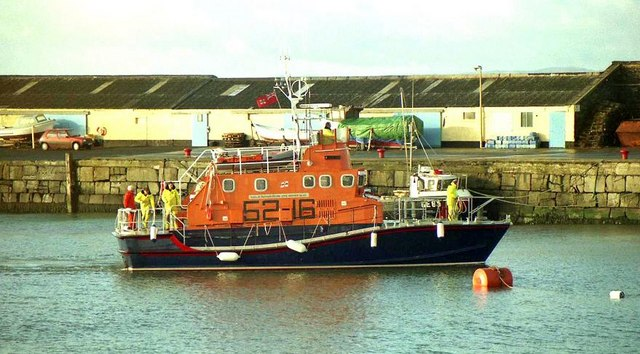
Arun-class lifeboat 52-16 Richard Evans (Civil Service No. 39) (ON 1070)

On 13 February 1989, the 52-foot Arun-class lifeboat 52-16 Richard Evans (Civil Service No. 39) (ON 1070) set out to the aid of two Spanish trawlers, reported to have run aground in a storm in Lough Swilly - possibly the worst storm for many years. As huge wave after huge wave passed the harbour entrance, the Portrush lifeboat paused for the right moment, before setting out into the full force of the storm, encountering waves twice the height of the harbour wall, with the wind speed indicator reading 113 mph (182 km/h). The moment was captured on camera by local photographer Ian Watson, but such was the ferocity of the wind, that he struggled to stand and hold his camera steady. The blurry image he captured was seen around the world, highlighting the bravery of the seven crew of the Portrush lifeboat. Crew member Terry Murdoch suffered cracked ribs, when he was thrown against the wheel. Just 30 minutes after setting out, the lifeboat was stood down, as the two Spanish vessels were safe, but there was no possibility of turning back for risk of capsize. The lifeboat spent the next three hours battling its way to the calmer waters of Lough Foyle at Greencastle, normally a 45-minute voyage.

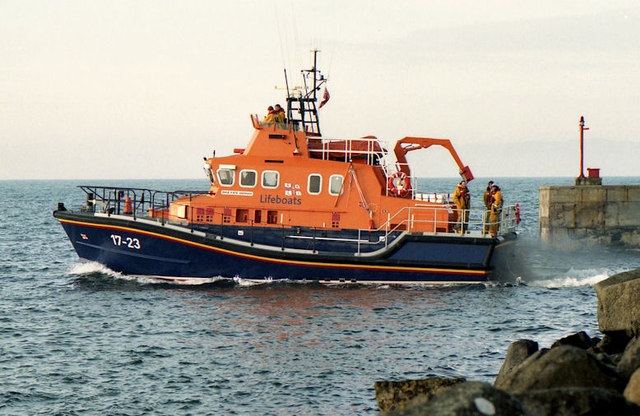
Severn-class lifeboat 17-23 Katie Hannan (ON 1247)

On 29 January 2008, the Portrush lifeboat 17-23 Katie Hannan (ON 1247), on station since 15 June 2000, was attempting the rescue of three men in a RIB in extremely rough conditions, when the boat was swept onto the rocks near the entrance to Rathlin Harbour and grounded. The three men were rescued by the coastguard, and all aboard the lifeboat got ashore.

It would be 18 days later when the boat was finally floated off the rocks, but inspection of the damaged hull revealed the boat was beyond repair. A permanent replacement Severn-class lifeboat, 17-30 William Gordon Burr (ON 1257) was placed on service 8 May 2008.

Lifeboat Mechanic Anthony Chambers was awarded the RNLI Bronze Medal after the rescue on 5 August 2009, of two boys cut off by the tide in a cave. After unsuccessful attempts to enter the cave with the D-class (IB1) Inshore lifeboat, Chambers entered the water, and swam into the cave to rescue the boys.

== Station honours ==
The following are awards made at Portrush:

- RNIPLS Silver Medal
  William Richardson – 1842
- RNLI Silver Medal
  Frederick Watt, Master Mariner – 1891
  John Hopkins, Coxswain – 1891
  William McAllister, Carpenter – 1891
  John Boyd, Seaman – 1891
  David Patton, Fisherman – 1891
  Robert Lemon, Professional Diver – 1916
  Samuel Cunningham, Coxswain – 1961
- RNLI Bronze Medal
  Robert McMullan, Second Coxswain – 1961
  Anthony Chambers, Mechanic – 2010
- 'The Thanks of the Institution inscribed on Vellum'
  James Martin, Coxswain – 1935
  K. D. Chambers, Mechanic – 1935
  The five crew members of the Portrush lifeboat – 1961
  Coxswain, and each member of the Portrush lifeboat crew – 1965
  Damian Rohdich, Helm – 2003
  Conchur Dickinson, crew member – 2007
  Dave Robinson – 2020
- A special Doctor's Thanks on Vellum
  Dr. William Hill – 1982
- Vellum Service certificate
  Des Austin, Coxswain – 2020
  Mark Mitchell, crew member – 2020
  Ben Durrant, crew member – 2020
  Lisa Abernethy, crew member – 2020
  Raymond Fletcher, crew member – 2020
  Beni McAllister, Launch Authority – 2020
- 'A Framed Letter of Thanks signed by the Chairman of the Institution'
  Albert McQuilken, first aider – 1982
  Trevor Creelman, crew member – 1991
  Trevor McMullan, crew member – 1991
  Liam Smith, crew member – 2007
  Des Austin, Coxswain – 2020
- Royal Humane Society Certificate
  William Robert Knox – 1925
- Commander, Order of the British Empire (CBE)
  William Robert Knox, MBE, MM, JP – 1961NHY
- Member, Order of the British Empire (MBE)
  William Robert Knox, MM, JP, Honorary Secretary – 1951NYH
  John Robert Edwin Scott, Honorary Secretary – 2001NYH
  Robert James Kennedy Cardwell – 2017QBH

== Roll of honour ==
In memory of those lost whilst serving Portrush lifeboat:

- Lost when the lifeboat Robert and Agnes Blair (ON 158) capsized, 1 November 1889
  Galbraith H. Grills, Chief Officer, H.M. Coastguard
  James McAlister (30)
  William McNeill (50)

== Portrush lifeboats ==
=== Pulling and Sailing (P&S) lifeboats ===
ON (Note: ON is the RNLI's Official Number of the boat.)	Name	Built	On Station	Class	Comments
Pre-370	Zelinda	1860	1860–1870	30-foot Peake self-righting (P&S)	(Note: 30 ft 0 in (9.14 m) x 7 ft 0 in (2.13 m) (6-oared) Peake-class self-righting (P&S) lifeboat, gift of Lady Cotton Sheppard of Antrim, built by Forrestt of Limehouse, London, costing £154, altered to 10-oared in 1865); Renamed Laura, Countess of Antrim in 1870.
Pre-370	Laura, Countess of Antrim	1860	1870–1876	30-foot Peake self-righting (P&S)	Declared Unfit in 1876.
Pre-608	John Whitaker	1876	1876–1889	32-foot Prowse self-righting (P&S)	(Note: 32 ft 0 in (9.75 m) x 7 ft 6 in (2.29 m) (10-oared) Prowse-class self-righting (P&S) lifeboat, legacy of Mr J. Whitaker of Blackheath, London, built by Woolfe of Shadwell, London, costing £287.); Sold in 1890.
158	Robert and Agnes Blair	1889	1889–1902	34-foot self-righting (P&S)	(Note: 34 ft 0 in (10.36 m) x 7 ft 6 in (2.29 m) (10-oared) self-righting (P&S) lifeboat, legacy of Mrs A. Blair of Blairmore, Argyll, built by Watkins of Blackwall, London, costing £363.); Broken up in 1902.
494	Hopwood	1902	1902–1924	35-foot Liverpool (P&S)	(Note: 35 ft 0 in (10.67 m) x 10 ft 0 in (3.05 m) (12-oared) Liverpool-class non-self-righting (P&S) lifeboat, legacy of Miss E. Heartwell of London, built by Thames Ironworks of Blackwall, London, costing £817.); Transferred to the relief fleet, later at Minehead.

Pre ON numbers are unofficial numbers used by the Lifeboat Enthusiasts' Society to reference early lifeboats not included on the official RNLI list.

=== Motor lifeboats ===
ON	Op.No. (Note: Op. No. is the RNLI's Operational Number of the boat carried on the hull.)	Name	Built	On station	Class	Comments
686	–	T. B. B. H.	1924	1924–1949	45-foot Watson	
867	–	Lady Scott (Civil Service No.4)	1949	1949–1981	46-foot 9in Watson	
1070	52-16	Richard Evans (Civil Service No.39)	1981	1981–2000	Arun	
1247	17-23	Katie Hannan	2000	2000–2008	Severn	Wrecked on service, 29 January 2008.
1257	17-30	William Gordon Burr	2002	2008–	Severn	Previously in the Relief fleet.

More post-service details can be found on the respective lifeboat class pages.

=== Inshore lifeboats ===
==== D class ====
Op.No.	Name	On station	Class	Comments
D-378	Unnamed	1993–1994	D-class (EA16)	
D-456	Jonathan Simpson	1994–2002	D-class (EA16)	
D-572	Ken and Mary	2002–2010	D-class (EA16)	
D-738	David Roulston (Civil Service No. 52)	2010–2022	D-class (IB1)	
D-871	The Ken Blair	2022–	D-class (IB1)	

== See also ==
- List of RNLI stations
- List of former RNLI stations
- Royal National Lifeboat Institution lifeboats
