= RNLB Sir William Hillary =

Unique British lifeboat built 1929

History

Flag of the RNLI
- Name: Sir William Hillary
- Owner: RNLI
- Ordered: 1
- Builder: John I. Thornycroft & Company
- Cost: £18,430
- Laid down: September 1928
- Christened: 10 July 1930
- Completed: November 1929
- In service: 1930
- Fate: Sunk 1980

General characteristics
- Type: Fast motor lifeboat
- Displacement: 27 tons
- Length: 64 ft (20 m)
- Beam: 14 ft (4.3 m)
- Draught: 5 ft 1 in (1.55 m)
- Installed power: 2 Thorneycroft 375bhp petrol engines
- Propulsion: Twin screw
- Speed: 17.25 kn (31.95 km/h)
- Range: 94 nmi (174 km) at 12 kn (22 km/h)
- Crew: 7

RNLB Sir William Hillary (ON 725) was a fast motor lifeboat operated by the Royal National Lifeboat Institution (RNLI) from Dover Lifeboat Station, England. It was specially designed to attend aircraft crashes in the English Channel, but in its 10 years at Dover it did not rescue anyone from an aircraft. It was operated by the Royal Navy during World War II and then sold, being used as a motor cruiser until it sank in 1980.

== History ==
The RNLI was founded in 1824 following calls by William Hillary to establish a national lifeboat service in the United Kingdom. During its first 100 years it had been mostly concerned with ships and boats that ran aground or sank near the coast. Speed was not usually of great importance for these services, instead lifeboats were designed to be able to operate safely in poor conditions and carry large numbers of survivors to safety. In the 1920s the RNLI management became aware of new demands arising from aircraft coming down over the sea. When this happened, it was important to reach the aircraft quickly as it would be unlikely to stay afloat for long and would not be carrying its own lifeboats.

A lifeboat was specially designed by James Rennie Barnett, the RNLI's naval architect, to fulfil this need. It was built by John I. Thornycroft & Company at Hampton-on-Thames. Construction started in September 1928 and was completed in November 1929. It arrived at Dover on 21 January 1930 where it was kept in the Eastern Docks. It was named Sir William Hillary by Edward, Prince of Wales on 10 July 1930. Also present for this were the Calais lifeboat Maréchal-Foch of the French Société Centrale de Sauvetage des Naufrages, and the RNLI's new Barnett-class Lady Jane and Martha Ryland which was on its way to Lerwick.

Although it was designed to save people on aircraft that ditched in the English Channel, it did not save anyone from aircraft crashes during the 10 years it was operated by the RNLI. Dover was close to the front line in World War II. The RNLI continued to provide a service but Sir William Hillary was requisitioned by the Royal Navy in November 1940. It operated for the remainder of the war as an air-sea rescue craft from various harbours.

After the war it was sold and converted to a motor cruiser and named Isle of Colonsay. It was involved in a collision on 31 October 1980 in the Bay of Biscay and sunk near Cape St. Vincent.

== Specification ==
The high speed design was achieved by being more narrow than usual in proportion to its length, but the ribs that give strength to the wooden hull were much closer together than in other lifeboats. The keel, stem and stern were made from oak; the ribs were from elm and the skin was a double layer of mahogany. Overall, it was 64 ft (20 m) long and 14 ft (4.3 m) wide. There were more than 80 air cases to give buoyancy, and the hull was divided into 8 water-tight compartments. Two cabins were provided for the crew and the people that they rescued. Maximum capacity was about 100 passengers.

It was powered by two Thornycroft Y 375 bhp 12-cylinder petrol engines which gave a top speed of 17.25 kn (31.95 km/h). Fuel tanks carried 350 imp gal (1,600 L) which gave a range of 78 nmi (144 km) at full speed or 94 nmi (174 km) at 12 kn (22 km/h). An electric generator provided power for equipment including searchlights and radio.

Sir William Hillary was the fastest and largest RNLI lifeboat at the time. The largest lifeboats at other stations were four 60 ft (18 m) Barnett-class lifeboats, capable of 9 kn (17 km/h).

== Silver medal service ==
On 26 November 1939, just a few months after the start of World War II, Sir William Hillary was called out to assist the Blackburn Rovers. This was a trawler being used by the Royal Navy for anti-submarine patrols which was adrift in a gale and close to a minefield near the South Goodwin Sands. By the time the lifeboat reached the trawler it had drifted into the minefield but the lifeboat managed to get alongside, despite the heavy seas and strong wind. The trawler's crew of 16 were taken aboard and it was purposely sunk to prevent secret equipment getting into the hands of the enemy. It took the lifeboat three hours to return to Dover because of the gale; the whole service took five and a half hours.

The lifeboat's coxswain, Colin Bryant, was awarded an RNLI Silver Medal for gallantry. Second coxswain Sidney Hills and mechanics Wilfred Cook and Christian Stock were each awarded an RNLI Bronze Medal, as was Lieutenant Richard Walker, the Assistant Harbour Master, who accompanied the lifeboat crew with secret nautical charts to navigate them through the minefields.
