= Islay Lifeboat Station =

RNLI Lifeboat station in Argyll and Bute, Scotland

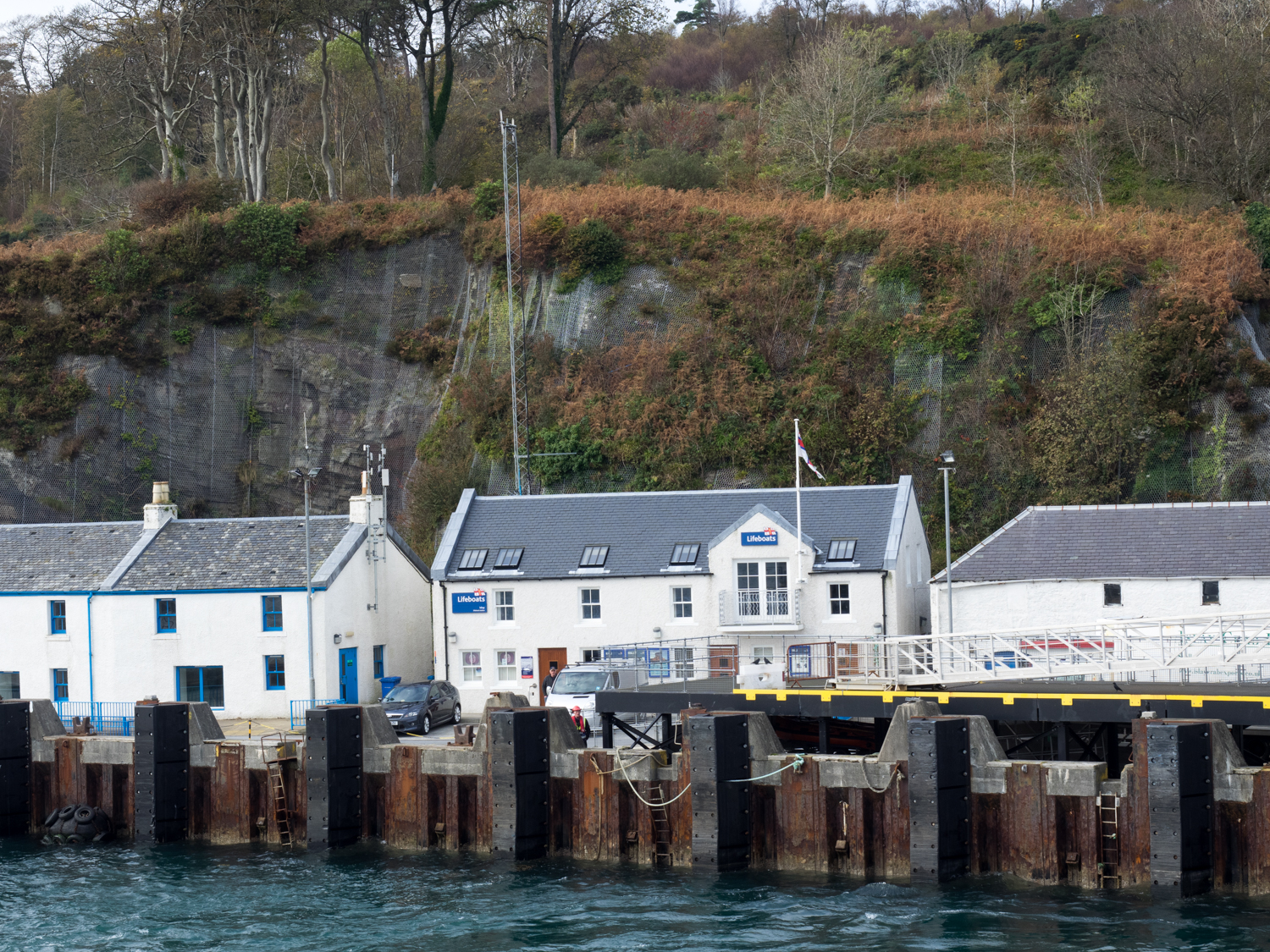
- Islay Lifeboat Station

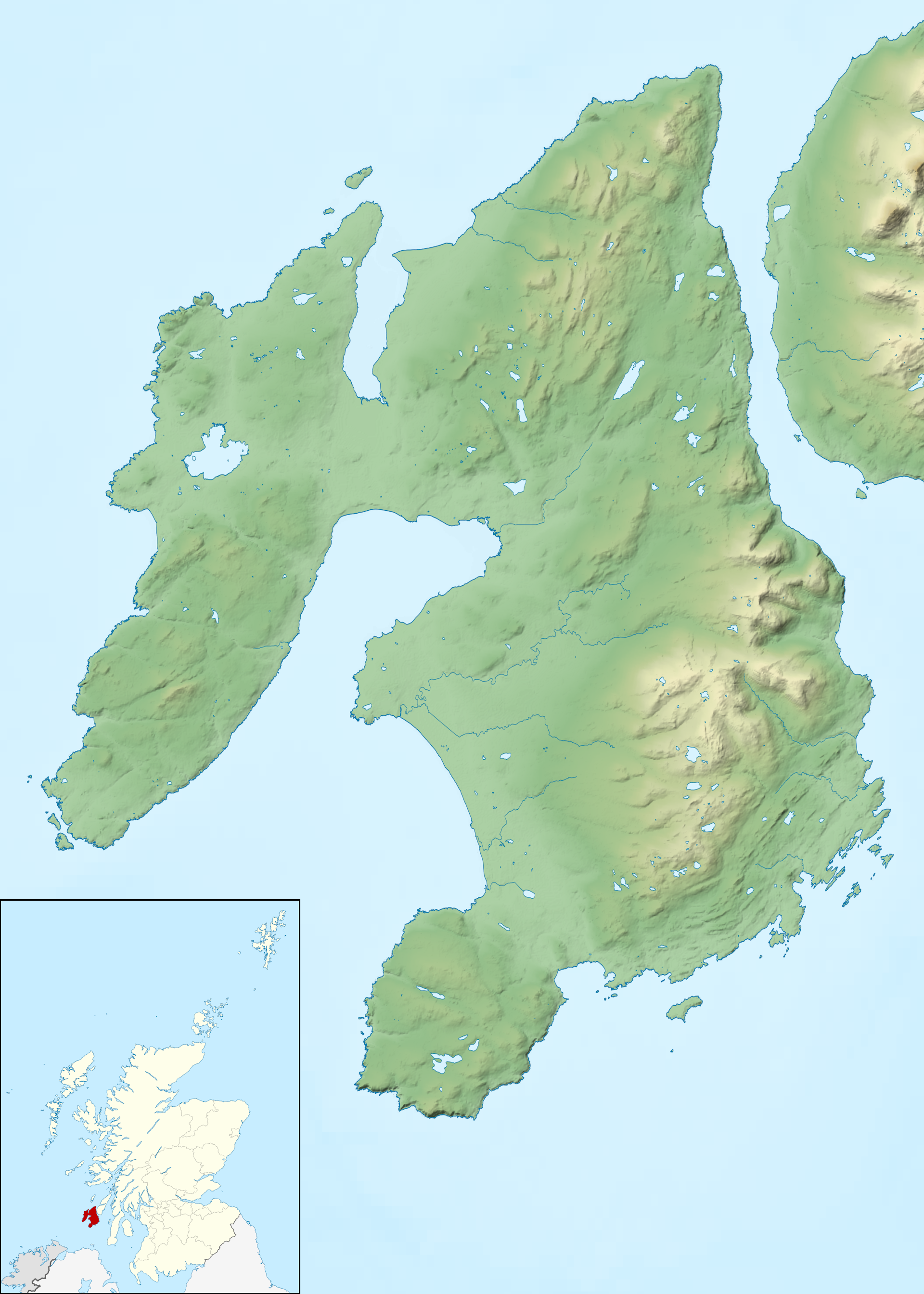
- Location within Islay Location within Argyll and Bute
- Former names: Port Askaig Lifeboat Station

General information
- Type: RNLI Lifeboat Station
- Location: Port Askaig, Isle of Islay, Argyll and Bute, PA46 7RB, Scotland
- Coordinates: 55°50′54.7″N 6°06′18.0″W
- Opened: 1934
- Owner: Royal National Lifeboat Institution

Website
- Islay RNLI Lifeboat Station

Islay Lifeboat Station is located in the harbour village of Port Askaig, which sits on the Sound of Islay, in the north east corner of the Isle of Islay, off the north-west coast of Scotland.

In 1934, Port Askaig Lifeboat Station was established on Islay by the Royal National Lifeboat Institution (RNLI).

The station currently operates a Severn-class All-weather lifeboat, 17-08 Helmut Schroder of Dunlossit II (ON 1219), on station since 1997.

== History ==
Ever since its founding in 1824, the Royal National Institution for the Preservation of Life from Shipwreck (RNIPLS), later to become the RNLI in 1854, would award medals for deeds of gallantry at sea, even if no lifeboats were involved.

On 20 October 1911, in strong gale force conditions and thick fog, the Norwegian steamship Ena of Kragerø ran aground on the shore of the Mull of Oa, with 18 crew and one passenger aboard. The following day, 15 men made it ashore in the ship's boat. Now in full gale force conditions, a local fisherman managed to land on a rock between the vessel and the shore, and caught a line floated to him. With a cradle improvised, the four remaining men were brought to safety. Fisherman Duncan Campbell was awarded the RNLI Silver Medal.

The 38 ft (12 m) motor-lifeboat Frederick H. Pilley (ON 657) set out from Falmouth on 12 March 1934, on a 10-day, 471 miles (758 km) journey, to her new station at Islay. Built in 1920, she was a 14-year-old boat, having previously served at The Lizard, with a record of 120 lives saved. On board with Commander J. M. Upton, RD, RNR, Inspector of Life-boats for the Irish District, was Ralph Scott (travelling mechanic), and four experienced fishermen who were to form a crew. These were Peter McPhee (coxswain), Hugh Buie (second coxswain), A. McPhee (motor mechanic) and J. McDougall, none of whom had ever been at sea on a lifeboat. The boat stopped at Penzance, Padstow and Angle, before crossing the Irish Sea to Rosslare Harbour, and then headed up the Irish coast via Dún Laoghaire and Donaghadee. Particularly bad weather was encountered during the first part of the journey, arriving in both Angle and Rosslare in a full gale. Commander Upton said that this was the worst passage he had undertaken on a lifeboat, but it did highlight the qualities of the boat, giving confidence to the new crew. An unscheduled stop was made at Larne, due to the wind and strong tidal current preventing the boat from making headway. The final call was at Port Ellen, before arriving at her new home on 21 March 1934.

Frederick H. Pilley (ON 657) had been placed at Islay temporarily, to allow for the construction and establishment of a new lifeboat station at Port Askaig. The 46-foot 6in Watson-class lifeboat Charlotte Elizabeth (ON 774) arrived in Port Askaig in the following year in 1935.

In 1947, Charlotte Elizabeth was temporarily relocated to Port Ellen on Islay, due to post World War II crewing difficulties, but returned to the station at Port Askaig in 1948, which was then renamed Islay Lifeboat Station.

Coxswain Duncan McNeill would receive a gift of £10 in 1950, an annual award provided by Mrs G. M. Porter of Felixstowe, for the bravest deed of the year by a member of lifeboat crew. At 16:45 on the 12 April 1950, the lifeboat station received reports of a World War II Mine floating south through the Sound of Islay. With his own small boat in tow, Coxswain McNeill launched the relief lifeboat Manchester and Salford (ON 689), located the mine, and then set out in his own boat. With the lifeboat 1/4 mi (0.40 km) away, he secured a rope to the mine, which was then towed to shore, out of danger to shipping.

The 31 January 1953 was a day of disasters. The Princess Victoria, one of the earliest roll-on/roll-off car ferries foundered in the North Channel, with the loss of 133 lives. On the same day, the Islay lifeboat was launched at 17:45 into a full north-north-east gale, to the aid of a vessel 3 miles (4.8 km) south of Jura, but nothing was found, and the lifeboat returned at 22:30. Soon afterwards, the boat was called again, this time to the fishing trawler Michael Griffiths. On passage, two of the crew, Second Coxswain A. McNeill, and Assistant Mechanic John MacTaggart, headed to the engine-room to dry their clothes. Overcome by fumes, both men died. At Oban Sheriff Court on 6 March 1953, Mr. R. Johnston Macdonald returned a formal verdict of "death by poisoning by carbon monoxide fumes". All 15 crew of the Michael Griffiths were also lost.

In hurricane conditions on 27 October 1959, the Charlotte Elizabeth (ON 774) was launched at 09:30 to the aid of the motor fishing vessel May, aground on a reef near the Black Rocks buoy. After unsuccessful attempts to fire a line to the vessel, the crew of the May managed to float a line to the lifeboat.The four crew were taken off by breeches buoy, and landed at Port Askaig at 16:30. For this service, Coxswain James Gillies was awarded the RNLI Bronze Medal.

47-foot Watson-class lifeboat Francis W. Wotherspoon of Paisley (ON 951) in 2015

At a ceremony held at Port Askaig on 22 July 1960, the Rev G. W. Charlton of the parish of Kilmeny dedicated the new 47-foot Watson-class Islay lifeboat. Funded from a legacy, the lifeboat was duly named Francis W. Wotherspoon of Paisley (ON 951) after its benefactor, by Lady Jean Fforde. On service at Islay for 20 years, the lifeboat would come to be launched 93 times, and save 60 lives.

Francis W. Wotherspoon of Paisley (ON 951) was withdrawn in 1979, and replaced by a Thames-class lifeboat. The Thames class was an RNLI development of the Waveney-class lifeboats, and had a 50 feet (15 m) steel hull, powered by a pair of 390 horsepower (290 kW) General Motors diesel engines. Initially six were ordered, but the project was cancelled with the development of the Arun-class lifeboat, and only two were constructed at Brooke Marine of Lowestoft. Built in 1976, 50-002 was initially used for trials, before being assigned to Islay. A donation from the Schroder Charity Trust funded the boat. At a ceremony in Port Askaig on Saturday 28 July, attended by over 1,000 islanders and guests, Bruno L. Schroder of the Dunlossit estate Islay, and son of the late Helmut Schroder, formally handed over the boat to the RNLI. It was then named Helmut Schroder of Dunlossit (ON 1032).

On Sunday 18 November 1979, both the Islay lifeboat, 50-002 Helmut Schroder of Dunlossit (ON 1032), and the Barra Island lifeboat, R. A. Colby Cubbon No.3 (ON 935), were launched just after midnight, to the aid of the Danish coaster Lone Dania, listing badly 6 miles (9.7 km) north west of Skerryvore Lighthouse, after her cargo had shifted in terrible condition. The wind strength varied from strong gale, force 9, to violent storm and hurricane, force 11 to 12, and gusts of up to 65 knots (120 km/h; 75 mph) were recorded at nearby airports. At 01:43, the Islay lifeboat was capsized. The lifeboat self-righted, and the crew were OK, with just the odd minor injury, but the boat had engine problems, a failed radar and windscreen wipers, and it was decided to return to port.

At 03:46, with the boat under full speed, the lifboat from Barra Island was also capsized. Another coaster, Sapphire, which had also been heading to the Lone Dania, changed course, and the Barra Island lifeboat was towed back to port. The Lone Dania later made port under escort with another coaster. Coxswain Alastair Campbell of Islay lifeboat said they were the worst conditions he had encountered in 17 years as a lifeboatman, and in his previous career as a merchant seaman.

Severn-class lifeboat 17-08 Helmut Schroder of Dunlossit II (ON 1219)

Work was started in 1995 to improve crew facilities, with dredging taking place in the basin to accommodate a new larger lifeboat, works being completed in 1996. In 1997, the new Severn-class lifeboat 17-08 Helmut Schroder of Dunlossit II (ON 1219) was placed on service, once again funded by the Schroder Charity Trust.

At 00:45 on 16 February 2016, Islay lifeboat Helmut Schroder of Dunlossit II set out the aid of a sole Russian yachtsman, whose vessel had struck the rocks at Skerryvore in treacherous conditions, at times gale force 11. It was 03:00 when the casualty was found, 5 miles (8.0 km) from Skerryvore. With Coastguard helicopter R100 in support, many attempts were made to get the man to tie a line to his boat, but failed due to both conditions and communication difficulties. Having struggled to recover the man for nearly eight hours, the large pipe-laying ship Deep Energy arrived on scene. Due to its size, it was able to provide some shelter to the yacht, and the man was finally brought on board, from where he was airlifted to safety. The Islay lifeboat returned to port at 18:20. Coxswain David MacLellan was awarded the RNLI Bronze Medal.

On 24 November 2022, Islay Lifeboat Station welcomed Leonie Schroder as their new president. Leonie followd on from her father Bruno Schroder, who was president until his death in 2019. The Schroder family of the Dunlossit estate on Islay have been long-time supporters of the Islay lifeboat through their Schroder Charity Trust.

== Station honours ==
The following are awards made at Islay:

- RNLI Silver Medal
  Duncan Campbell – 1912
- RNLI Bronze Medal
  James Gillies, Coxswain – 1959
  Malcolm Mackay, Acting Coxswain – 1973
  Malcolm Mackay, Acting Coxswain – 1973 (Second-Service clasp)
  David MacLellan, Coxswain – 2016
- 'The Thanks of the Institution inscribed on Vellum'
  Malcolm Mackay, Second Coxswain – 1970
  Archibald Campbell, Assistant Mechanic – 1970
  David MacLellan, Coxswain – 2008
- 'A Framed Letter of Thanks signed by the Chairman of the Institution'
  D. J. McPhee, Coxswain – 1970
  Islay Lifeboat Crew – 1970
  David McArthur, Mechanic – 2016
  Thomas Coope, Navigator – 2016
  Duncan MacGillivray, crew member – 2016
  Peter Thomson, crew member – 2016
  Capt. Martin Porter, of the pipelaying vessel Deep Energy – 2016
- 'A Letter of Thanks from the Operations Director of the Institution'
  Pilot and Crew of Coastguard helicopter R100 – 2016
  Gavin Hyne, crew member, Deep Energy, (and Asst. Mechanic at Buckie Lifeboat Station) – 2016
- 'A Collective Letter of Thanks signed by the Chairman of the Institution'
  Thomas Johnston, Coxswain Mechanic – 1992
  Alasdair Barker, Second Coxswain Emergency Mechanic – 1992
  James Hamilton, Assistant Mechanic – 1992
  Iain Spears, Deputy Second Coxswain – 1992
  David MacLellan, crew member – 1992
  Michael Stringer, crew member – 1992
- Order of the Three Stars, awarded by the Latvian Government.
  Peter MacPhee, Coxswain – 1938
- Communion Cup and plate, awarded by the ship-owner of the steamer Helena Faulbaums of Riga.
  Port Askaig church – 1938
- A £10 gift from Mrs G. M. Porter of Felixstowe, given for the bravest deed of the year by a member of the lifeboat crew.
  Duncan McNeil, Coxswain – 1950
- A Case of Rum, awarded by the Sugar Cane Manufacturers Association of Jamaica,
  for the longest winter service of 1957.
  Islay Lifeboat Crew – 1958

== Roll of honour ==
In memory of those lost whilst serving at Islay:

- On service to the trawler Michael Griffiths, both men collapsed and died in the engine room, 31 January 1953
  A. McNeill, Second Coxswain
  John MacTaggart, Assistant Mechanic

== Islay lifeboats ==
ON (Note: ON is the RNLI's Official Number of the boat.)	Op.No. (Note: Op.No. is the RNLI's Operational Number of the boat carried on the hull.)	Name	Built	On station	Class	Comments
657	–	Frederick H. Pilley	1920	1934−1935	38-foot self-righting (motor)	(Note: 38 ft 0 in (11.58 m) x 9 ft 9 in (2.97 m) self-righting (motor) lifeboat, the gift of Mr F. H. Pilley, constructed by Summers & Payne of Southampton, completed by S. E. Saunders of Cowes, with single 40-hp 'Tylor' engine, costing £5,592 when new.); Previously at The Lizard. Transferred to Fleetwood.
774	–	Charlotte Elizabeth	1935	1935−1959	45-foot 6in Watson	Transferred to the Relief fleet.
951	–	Francis W. Wotherspoon of Paisley	1959	1959−1979	47-foot Watson	Transferred to the Relief fleet. Later at Fishguard
1032	50-002	Helmut Schroder of Dunlossit	1976	1979−1997	Thames	
1219	17-08	Helmut Schroder of Dunlossit II	1996	1997–	Severn	

More post-service details can be found on the respective lifeboat class pages.

== See also ==
- List of RNLI stations
- List of former RNLI stations
- Royal National Lifeboat Institution lifeboats
