= Bay-class lifeboat =

High-Endurance Search and Rescue Lifeboats

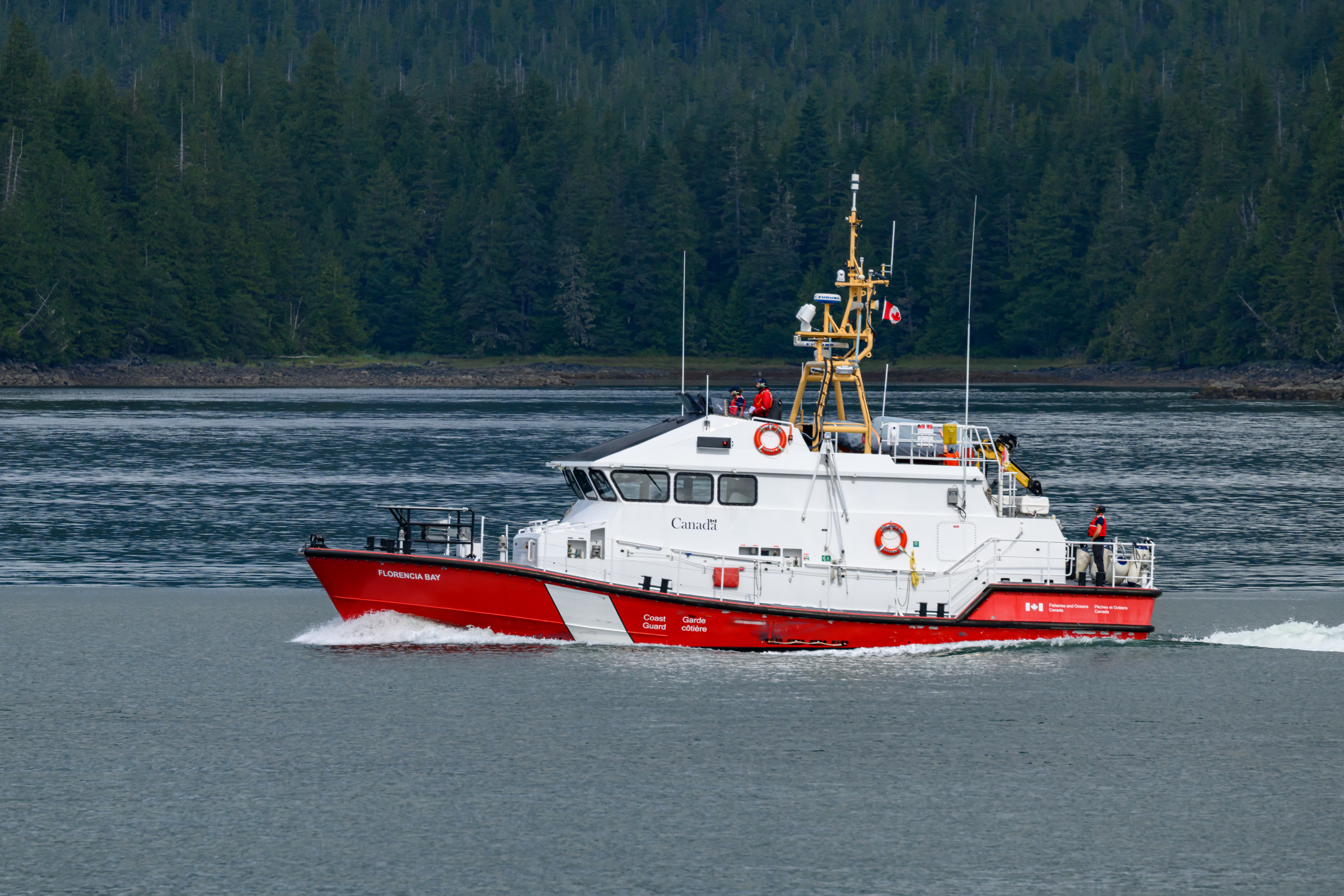
- Port side of CGCS Florencia Bay, underway off Dowager Island, British Columbia, Canada.

Class overview
- Name: Bay class
- Builders: Hike Metal Products Ltd., Wheatley; Chantier Naval Forillon, Gaspé
- Operators: Canadian Coast Guard
- Preceded by: Arun class
- Cost: $9 million CAD ea ($180 million total)
- Built: 2015–2025
- In service: 2017–
- Planned: 20
- Completed: 20
- Active: 20

General characteristics
- Type: Lifeboat
- Displacement: 62.5 t (61.5 long tons)
- Length: 19 m (62 ft 4 in)
- Beam: 6.3 m (20 ft 8 in)
- Draught: 1.67 m (5 ft 6 in)
- Propulsion: 2 × Wajax MTU 10V2000 M94 engines; 1,600 hp (1,193 kW)
- Speed: 25 knots (46 km/h; 29 mph)
- Range: 250 nmi (460 km; 290 mi)
- Capacity: Two (2) survivors on stretchers and up to twelve (12) seated survivors.
- Complement: 4+2

The Bay-class lifeboat is a Robert Allan Ltd. modification of the 17 m (56 ft) Royal National Lifeboat Institution (RNLI) Severn-class lifeboat, designed to meet the needs of the Canadian Coast Guard for off-shore search and rescue operations in severe conditions. They are referred to as the Bay class, as each one is named after a Canadian bay.

== Programme ==
In 2015, the Canadian Coast Guard announced a request for proposals (RFP) to build up to ten new search and rescue lifeboats, as part of Canada's National Shipbuilding Procurement Strategy. The total was increased to 20, with Hike Metal Products of Wheatley, Ontario and Chantier Naval Forillon of Gaspé, Quebec equally building 10 each.

The vessels are intended to replace the Coast Guard's ten Arun-class lifeboats, which averaged 18 years of service at the time of the RFP.

The new design is the work of Canadian nautical architectural firm Robert Allan Ltd. and is a modification of the UK-designed Severn-class lifeboat (operated by the RNLI), making the vessels more suited to the extreme weather conditions that can be found off Newfoundland and Nova Scotia.

== Specifications ==
The Bay-class lifeboats have a cruising speed of 15 knots (28 km/h; 17 mph). The original specified top speed of 23.5 knots is now noted at 25 knots (46 km/h; 29 mph) following production; much faster than the earlier 18.5 knot Arun-class vessels. The boat has a cruising range of 250 nmi (460 km; 290 mi).

They are capable of operating in 12-metre (39 ft) waves, and in wind conditions at 12 on the Beaufort scale. The hull is constructed of aluminium, not FRC, as with the original Severn-class design.

== Bay-class fleet ==
| CCGS ON | Name | Built | In service | Station | Call sign | MMSI | Comments |
|---|---|---|---|---|---|---|---|
| 840996 | Baie de Plaisance | 2017 CNF | 2018– | Cap-aux-Meules, Magdalen Islands, QC | – | 316035925 | |
| 841103 | Pennant Bay | 2017 HMP | 2018– | Saint Anthony, NL | CGA2542 | 316035929 | |
| 842018 | McIntyre Bay | 2017 HMP | 2018– | Prince Rupert, BC | – | 316038296 | |
| 842071 | Pachena Bay | 2018 CNF | 2018– | Port Hardy, BC | – | 316038603 | |
| 842740 | Sacred Bay | 2019 HMP | 2019– | Old Perlican, NL | CGB3254 | 316039713 | |
| 842854 | Conception Bay | 2019 CNF | 2019– | Twillingate, NL | CGS6493 | 316039989 | |
| 843681 | Cadboro Bay | 2021 CNF | 2021– | Tahsis, BC | – | 316041898 | |
| 843977 | Florencia Bay | 2020 HMP | 2021– | Hartley Bay, BC | – | 316041901 | |
| 844581 | Hare Bay | 2021 CNF | 2021– | Sambro, NS | CGB2514 | 316044024 | |
| 844861 | La Poile Bay | 2020 HMP | 2021– | Louisbourg, NS | CGNX | 316041477 | |
| 845658 | Chignecto Bay | 2021 CNF | 2022– | Port Bickerton, NS | CGR3416 | 316045112 | |
| 845659 | Shediac Bay | 2020 HMP | 2022– | Saint John, NB | CGA4138 | 316045113 | |
| 846080 | Chedabucto Bay | 2022 CNF | 2023– | Clark's Harbour, NS | – | 316047969 | |
| 846284 | Gabarus Bay | 2022 HMP | 2023– | Burgeo, NL | – | 316047972 | |
| 847139 | Barrington Bay | 2023 HMP | 2023– | Burin, NL | – | 316049299 | |
| 847349 | Baie des Chaleurs | 2023 CNF | 2024– | Louisbourg, NS | – | 316049307 | |
| 848026 | Groswater Bay | 2024 HMP | 2025– | Lark Harbour, NL | – | 316051765 | |
| 848311 | Cascumpec Bay | 2024 CNF | 2025– | Shippagan, NB | – | 316051802 | |
| 849209 | Mira Bay | 2025 HMP | 2026– | Halifax, NS | – | 316056581 | |
| 849115 | Baie de Gaspé | 2025 CNF | 2025– | Rivière-au-Renard, QC | – | 316057011 | |

== Locations ==
Canada
British Columbia
Newfoundland
Nova Scotia
Quebec
New Brunswick

== See also ==
- Severn-class lifeboat
- Arun-class lifeboat#Canada
- Fraser Lifeboat 1A-04, Steveston, Richmond, BC
