= Dover Lifeboat Station =

RNLI lifeboat station in Kent, England

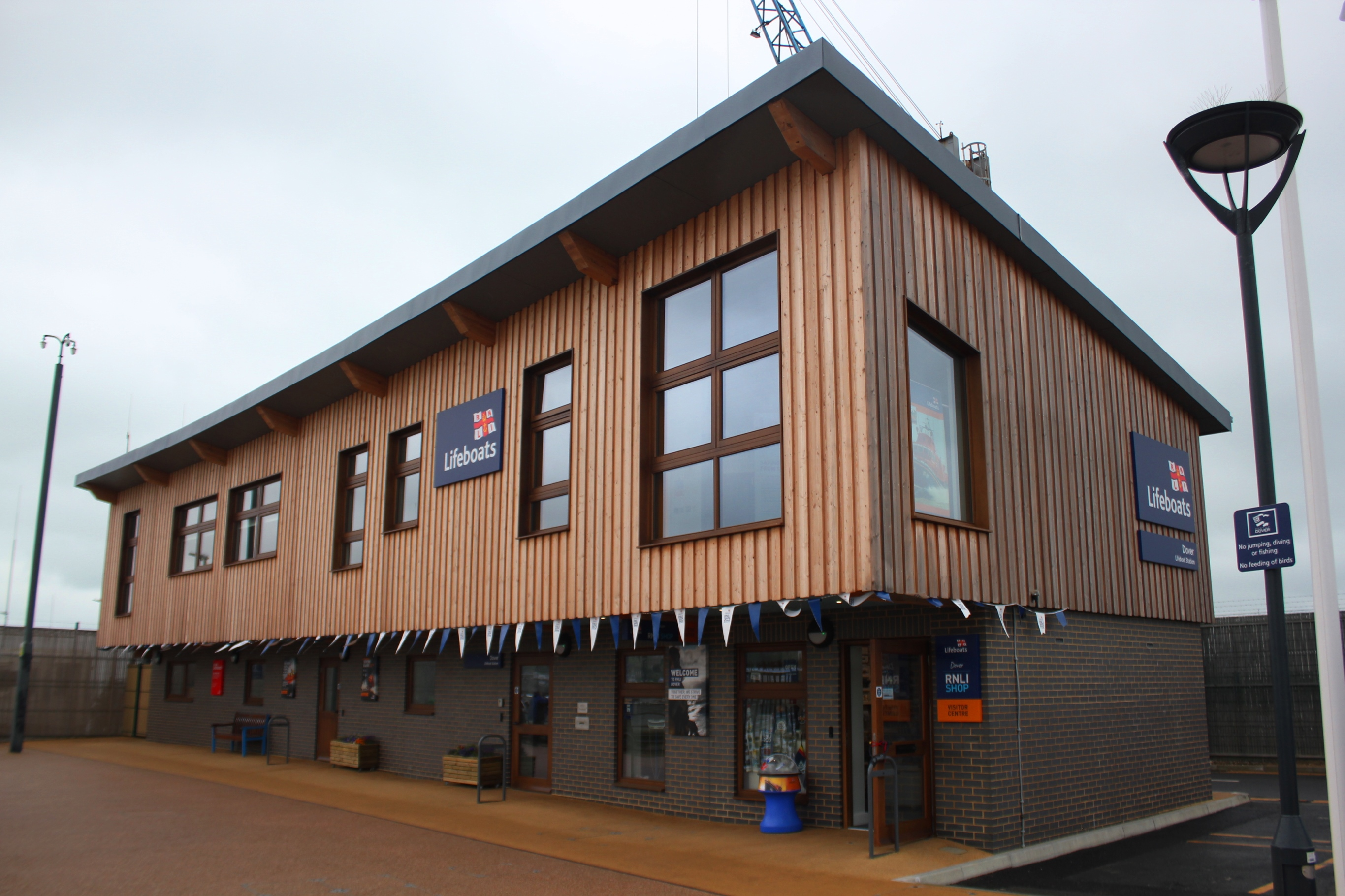
- Dover Lifeboat Station

- Location within Kent

General information
- Type: Lifeboat station
- Location: New Marina Curve Road,, Dover, Kent, CT17 9FQ, England
- Coordinates: 51°07′03″N 1°19′10″E
- Opened: First RNLI station 1855; Current station 2024
- Owner: Royal National Lifeboat Institution

Design and construction
- Architect: Studio 4

Website
- Dover RNLI Lifeboat Station

Listed Building – Grade II
- Feature: Clock tower and former lifeboat station
- Designated: 16 December 2009
- Reference no.: 1393606

Dover Lifeboat Station is located at New Marina Curve in Dover, a town and major ferry port, Port of Dover, which sits facing Calais, France, across the Strait of Dover, on the south-east coast of the English county of Kent.

A lifeboat station was first established at Dover in 1837, by the Dover Humane and Shipwreck Institution (DHSI). Management of the station was transferred to the Royal National Lifeboat Institution (RNLI) in 1855.

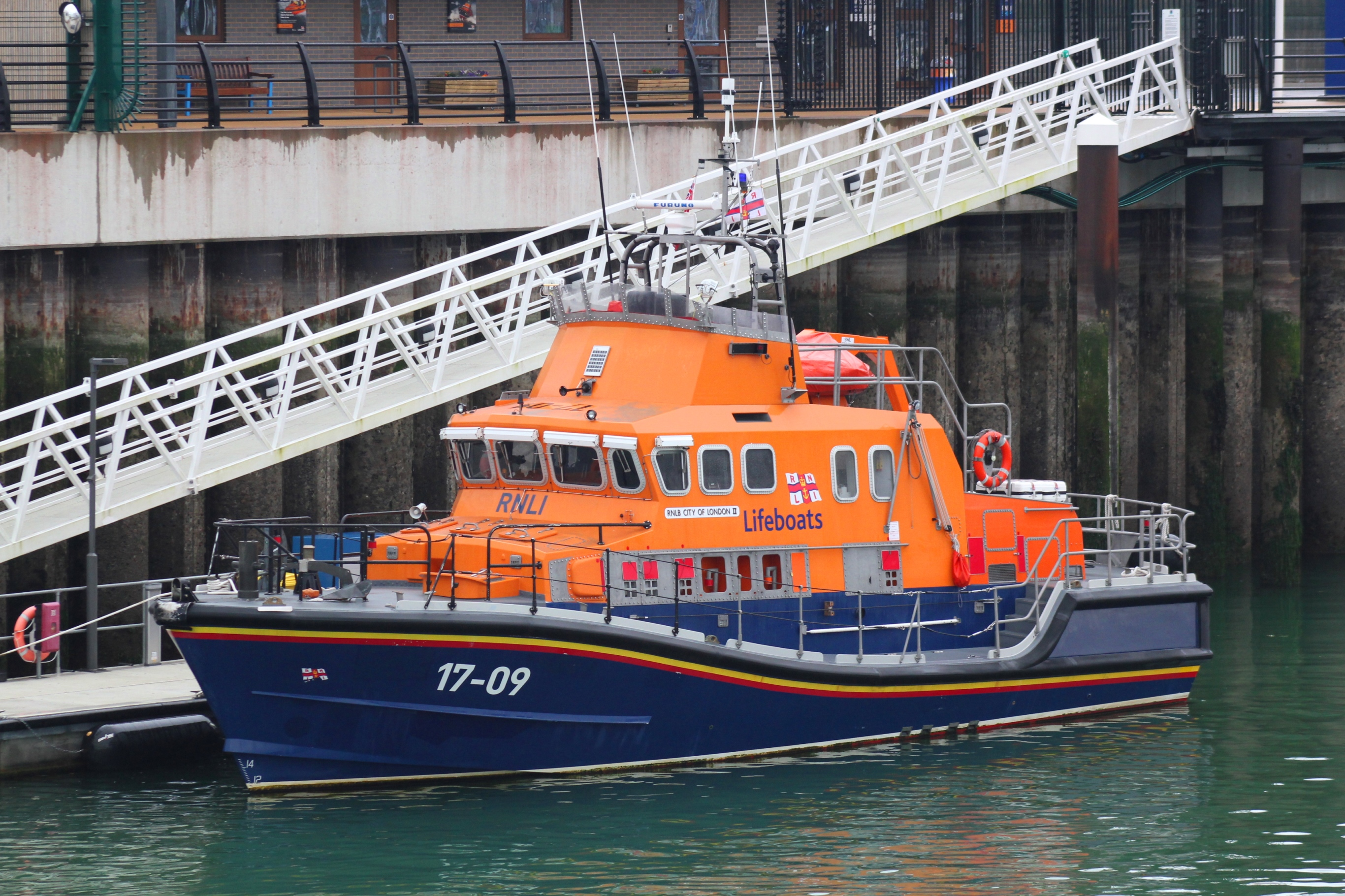
17-09 City of London II (ON 1220)

The station currently operates a Severn-class All-weather lifeboat.

== History ==
In a report to the House of Commons, 1,573 vessels were reported stranded or wrecked off Dover between 1833 and 1835, with 1,714 persons drowned.

The 'Dover Humane and Shipwreck Institution' was established, and a self-righting lifeboat was commissioned from local shipbuilder Elvin. A 37-foot (11m) self-righting 'Puling and Sailing' (P&S) lifeboat, one with sails and (12) oars, was placed on service in 1837, kept near North's Battery, and was in operation until 1853.

A replacement lifeboat was commissioned in 1853, built by Mr T. C. Clarkson of London. A smaller boat, 28-feet long, rowing 6 oars, and weighing just 27cwt. Two years later, the RNLI was invited to take over the management of the Dover lifeboat, which was agreed. The Clarkson lifeboat was modified to the standards of the Peake-class lifeboats.

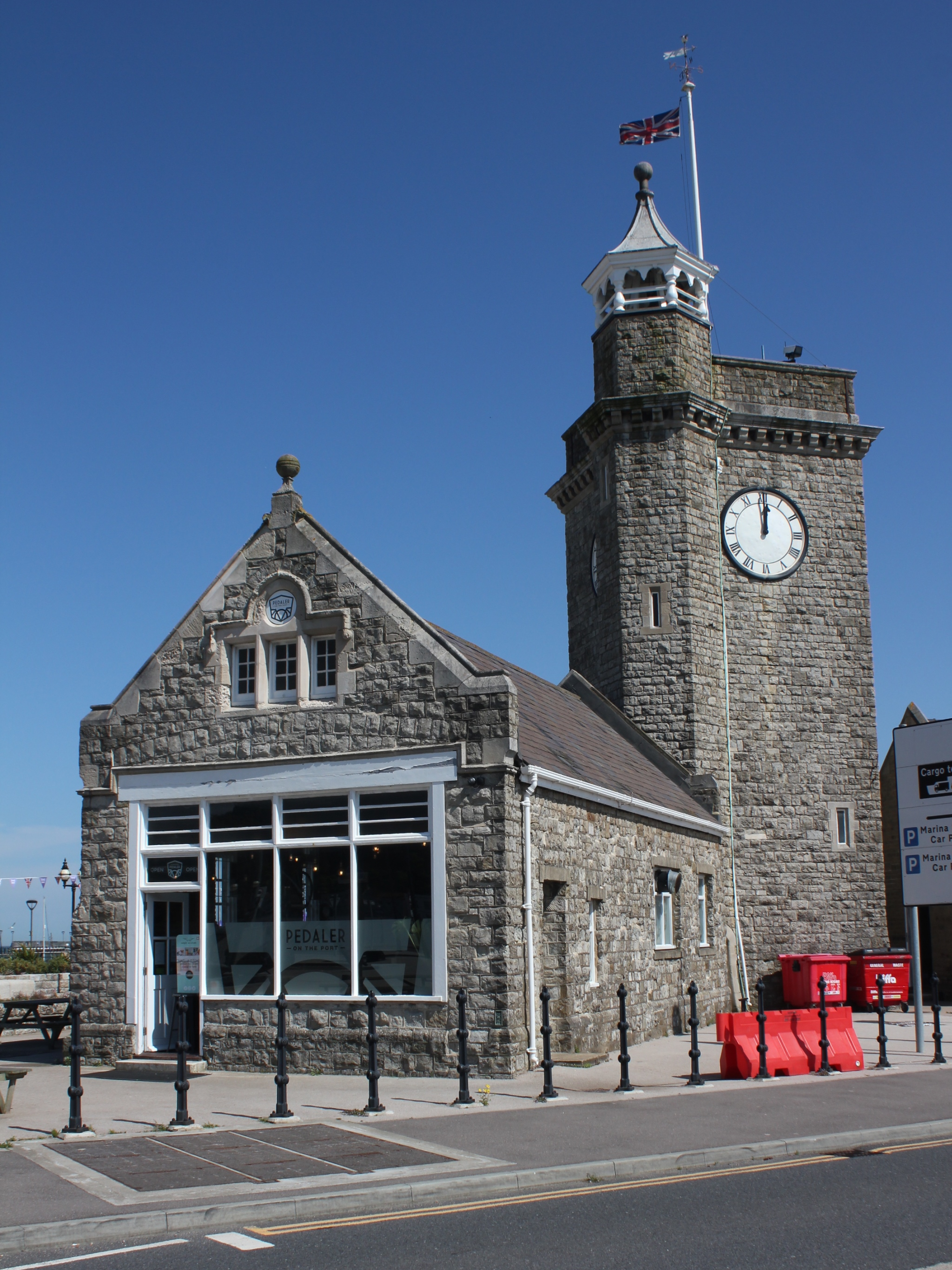
The 1893 lifeboat house and clock tower

In 1866, a boathouse was constructed at the western end of the Esplanade, at a cost of £244. A clock tower was built alongside, complete in 1877. However, in 1893, building work for the Dover Harbour of Refuge was started. To make way for the new pier, the clock tower was moved, and the lifeboat house was demolished, and replaced. The former boathouse at the Dover Western Docks has been designated a Grade II listed building, along with the adjacent clock tower.

=== First closure ===
In September 1914, following the outbreak of war, the station was forced to close due to difficulties maintaining a crew for the lifeboat.

The station re-opened in 1919, with a new steam lifeboat called James Stevens No. 3 placed on station. Built in 1898, this single propeller lifeboat was one of only six steam driven lifeboats, designed to be ready to steam immediately, at all times. However, the lifeboat still took at least 20 minutes to get up to steam, and required a large technical crew to keep her boilers fired. It was launched only five times before the station was closed again in 1922.

=== Camber (East Docks) station ===
With increased shipping and the advent of air traffic, the RNLI realised that a lifeboat station in Dover would again be required, and in 1929 a new boathouse was opened in the Eastern Docks at Camber. The re-opened station was supplied with a new faster lifeboat. The Sir William Hillary (ON 725), named after the founder of the RNLI, arrived on station in 1930 and was powered by twin 375 horsepower petrol engines with a top speed of 17.25 Knots. This was almost twice the speed of the rest of the RNLI’s fleet of lifeboats, most of which were capable of 9 Knots. The Dover station operated from this location until the Second World War. At the time of the Dunkirk evacuation the Sir William Hillary was away having a refit and overhaul. The relief lifeboat Agnes Cross (ON 663) remained at Dover until 1941, when the station closed again for the duration of the War.

=== Post-War re-opening ===
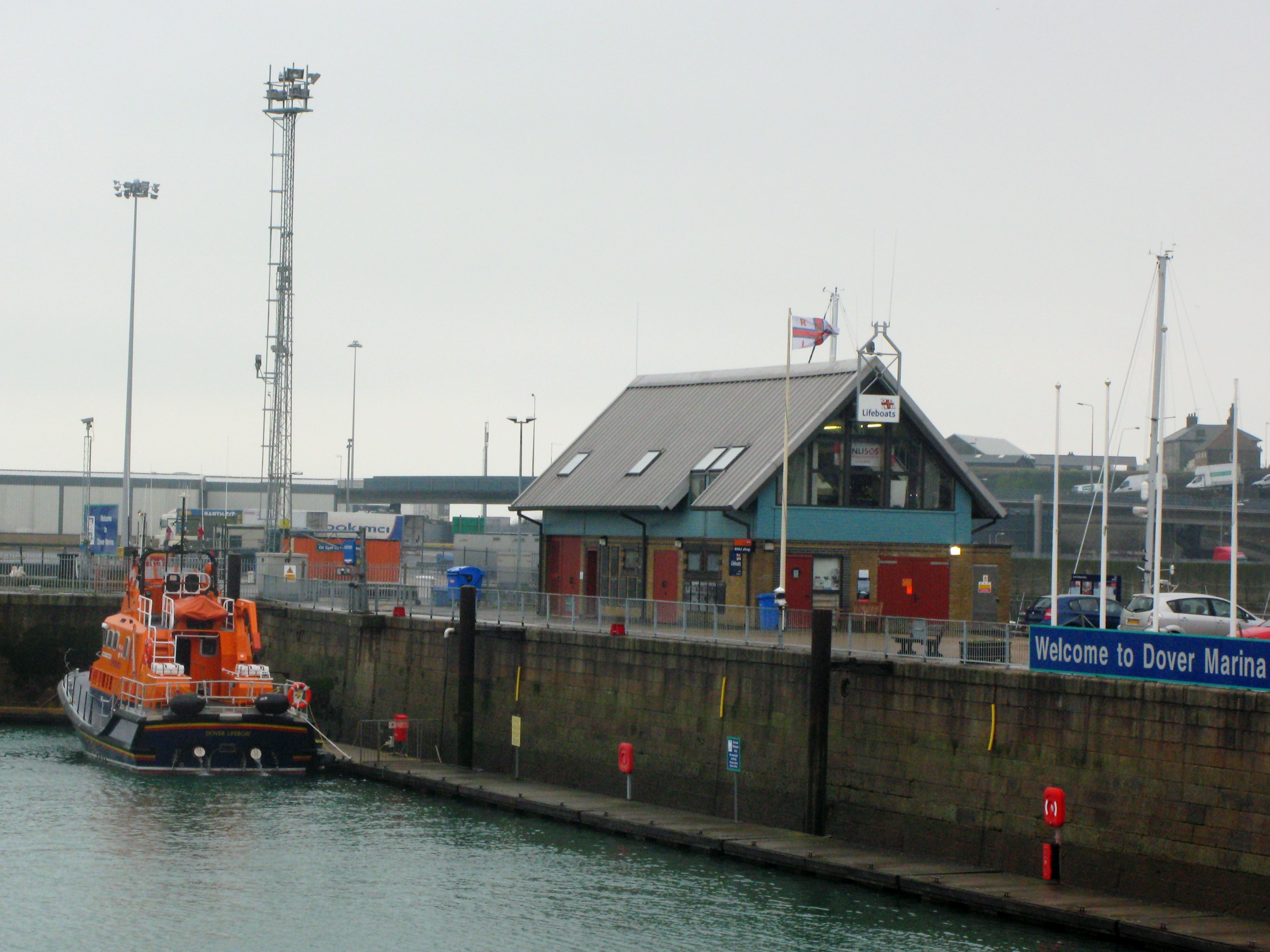
Cross Wall Quay Station (2000–2024)

It would be 1947 before post-war lifeboat operations recommenced at Dover, the station re-locating to the former Motor torpedo boat pens in the East Docks area. The rapid expansion of the Dover ferry terminal in the 1980s saw the lifeboat station move again, to the Tug Haven, situated in the inner harbour across from the Cross Wall Quay.

=== Cross Wall Quay ===
In the late 1990s, work began on a new station, built on Cross Wall Quay. Construction was completed in 2000, and the station began operating in August 2001. The legacy left to the RNLI helped fund the £513,000 cost of the building. The station was in use for 23 years.

=== New Marina Curve ===
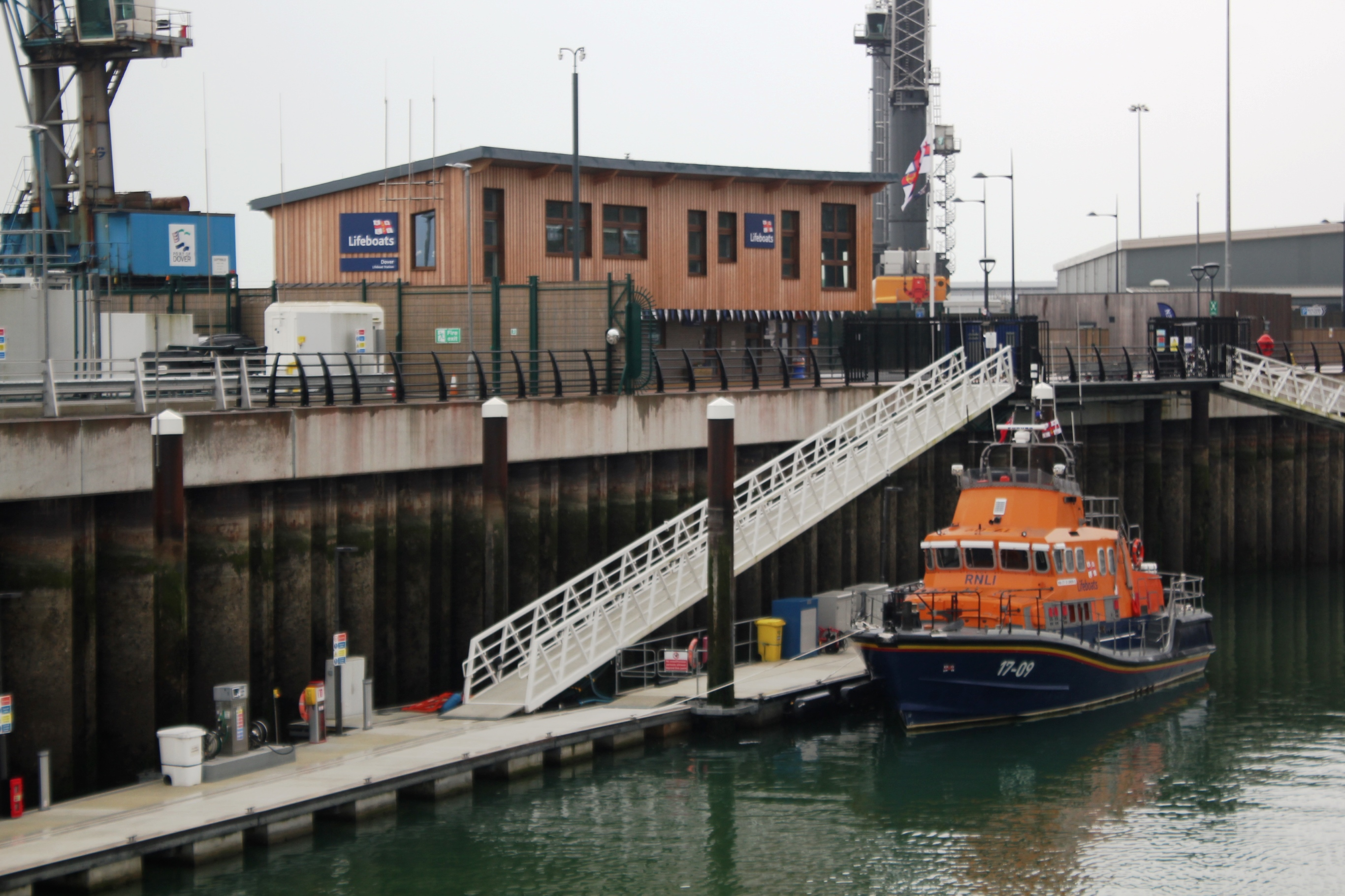
New Dover Lifeboat Station 2024

As part of the Port of Dover Western Docks redevelopment, it was decided to relocate the lifeboat station from Cross Wall Quay, located in the Inner Harbour, to the New Marina Curve. The lifeboat is now located in the Outer Harbour, providing faster access to open water.

The building was designed by Studio 4 architects to be as environmentally friendly as possible, with a Glulam timber-frame, ground source heating and solar panels. The move was announced in 2022 and construction started in February 2023. It was completed early the following year. The official opening was on 22 June 2024.

=== Replacement lifeboat ===
On 7 April 2026, the Severn-class All-weather lifeboat 17-51 "Ettrick Shepherd" Hogg Hardie (ON 1201) arrived on station, and will become the Dover lifeboat after a period of crew training. The lifeboat is the oldest Severn-class in the RNLI fleet, formerly 17-02 The Will, but from 2019, underwent a complete upgrade process, known as the Severn Life Extension Programme (SLEP), giving the vessel a further 25-years of operational life. 17-09 City of London II (ON 1220) was withdrawn from service at Dover on 13 May 2026.

== Station honours ==
Among the awards won by Dover's crews over the years are 19 RNLI medals for bravery, six silver and 13 bronze, the last being awarded in 1998.

The following are awards made at Dover:

- RNLI Silver Medal
  Major Henry Scott, Chairman of the Dover Branch – 1882
  James Woodgate, Coxswain – 1891
  James Woodgate, Coxswain – 1893 (Second-Service clasp)
  Colin H. Bryant, Coxswain – 1940
  Arthur Liddon, Coxswain/Mechanic – 1976
  Roy William Couzens, Acting Coxswain – 1988
- RNLI Bronze Medal
  Sidney T. Hills, Second Coxswain – 1940
  Wilfred L. Cook, Mechanic – 1940
  Christian R. T. Stock, Second Mechanic – 1940
  Lt. Richard Walker, RNR, Assistant King’s Harbour Master – 1940
  John Walker, Coxswain – 1951
  John Walker, Coxswain – 1956 (Second-Service clasp)
  Anthony George Hawkins, Second Coxswain/Assistant Mechanic – 1976
  Michael Frederick Abbott, Acting Assistant Mechanic/Emergency Coxswain – 1988
  Geoffrey Ian Buckland, crew member – 1988
  Dominic William McHugh, crew member – 1988
  Christopher William Ryan, crew member – 1988
  Robert John Bruce, crew member – 1988
  Eric St.John Tanner, crew member – 1988
- The Maud Smith Award 1987
  (for the bravest act of lifesaving during the year by a member of a lifeboat crew)
  Roy Couzens, Acting Coxswain – 1988
- The Thanks of the Institution inscribed on Vellum
  Richard John Hawkins, Second Assistant Mechanic – 1976
  John James Smith, crew member – 1976
  Gordon David, crew member – 1976
  Arthur Liddon, Coxswain Mechanic – 1977
  Anthony George Hawkins, Second Coxswain/Assistant Mechanic – 1977
  Anthony George Hawkins, Coxswain/Mechanic – 1981
  Anthony George Hawkins, Coxswain/Mechanic – 1992
  David Pascall, crew member – 1992
  Rodney Goldsack, crew member – 1992
- A Framed Letter of Thanks signed by the Chairman of the Institution
  G. V. James, crew member – 1979
  Anthony George Hawkins, Coxswain/Assistant Mechanic – 1982
  Dover Lifeboat Crew – 1982
  Anthony George Hawkins, Coxswain/Assistant Mechanic – 1985
  Dover Lifeboat Crew and Shore helpers – 1985
  The crews of the motor launches Darg, Denise and of the tug Dextrous – 1985
  Anthony George Hawkins, Coxswain/Assistant Mechanic – 1993
- A Special Certificate on Vellum
  Dr Sotiris Mantoudis – 1977
  Dr Peter Welch, honorary medical adviser – 1981
- Plaque awarded by the Seafarers International Union in New York
  Dover Lifeboat Station – 1952
- Testimonials awarded by the Royal Humane Society
  Henry Pegg, Motor Mechanic – 1954
  W. Wilfred Cook, a travelling mechanic of the Institution – 1954
- A letter of commendation from the Institution
  Dover Lifeboat Station – 1966
- A Letter of Appreciation signed by the Director of the Institution
  The Coxswain and crew – 1979
- Member, Order of the British Empire (MBE)
  Anthony George Hawkins, Coxswain/Assistant Mechanic – 1998QBH

== Roll of honour ==
In memory of those lost whilst serving Dover lifeboat.

- Crushed by a lifeboat carriage wheel during the launch of Mary Hamer Hoyle (ON 494), 11 September 1903.
  Alfred Nash, Police Inspector (56)

== Dover lifeboats ==
=== Operated by Dover Humane and Shipwreck Institution ===
On station	ON (Note: ON is the RNLI's Official Number of the boat.)	Name	Built	Class	Comments
1837–1853	–	Unnamed	1836	37-foot Non-self-righting	(Note: 37 ft (11 m) x 7 ft 3 in (2.21 m) (12-oared) non-self-righting lifeboat, built by Elvin of Dover.)
1853–1855	Pre-272	Unnamed	1853	28-foot Self-righting (P&S)	(Note: 28 ft (8.5 m) x 7 ft 6 in (2.29 m) (10-oared) self-righting (P&S) lifeboat, funded by Miss Angela Burdett-Coutts and DHSI, built by T. C. Clarkson of London.); Altered to Peake design by Forrestt of Limehouse, London in 1855, costing £98

Pre ON numbers are unofficial numbers used by the Lifeboat Enthusiasts' Society to reference early lifeboats not included on the official RNLI list.

=== Operated by the RNLI ===
==== Pulling and Sailing lifeboats ====
On station	ON	Name	Built	Class	Comments
1855–1858	Pre-272	Unnamed	1853	28-foot Self-righting (P&S)	Later in service with Sunderland Seamen's Association.
1858–1864	Pre-329	Unnamed	1858	28-foot Self-righting (P&S)	(Note: 28 ft (8.5 m) x 6 ft (1.8 m) (6-oared) self-righting (P&S) lifeboat, built by Forrestt of Limehouse, London, costing £131.)
1864–1878	Pre-422	Royal Wiltshire	1864	32-foot Prowse Self-righting (P&S)	(Note: 32 ft (9.8 m) x 7 ft 5 in (2.26 m) (10-oared) Prowse self-righting (P&S) lifeboat, funded from the collection by Capt. N. J. Reece, RN, of Marlborough, built by Forrestt of Limehouse, London, costing £218.)
1878–1888	Pre-636	Henry William Pickersgill, RA	1878	35-foot Self-righting (P&S)	(Note: 35 ft (11 m) x 9 ft (2.7 m) (10-oared) self-righting (P&S) lifeboat, legacy of Mr H. W. Pickersgill, RA of London, built by Woolfe of Shadwell, London, costing £363.)
1888–1901	197	Lewis Morice	1888	37-foot Self-righting (P&S)	(Note: 37 ft (11 m) x 8 ft (2.4 m) (12-oared) self-righting (P&S) lifeboat, legacy of Mr J. W. Morice of Erith, built by D. and W. Henderson and Company of Partick, costing £557.)
1901–1914	464	Mary Hamer Hoyle	1901	35-foot Self-righting (P&S)	(Note: 37 ft (11 m) x 9 ft 6 in (2.90 m) (10-oared) self-righting (P&S) lifeboat, gift of Mr I. Hoyle of Wimbledon, built by Thames Ironworks of Blackwall, London, costing £893.)

Station Closed 1914–1919

==== Steam lifeboat ====
On station	ON	Name	Built	Class	Comments
1919–1922	420	James Stevens No. 3	1898	Steam	

Station Closed 1922–1930

==== Motor lifeboats ====
On station	ON	Op. No. (Note: Op. No. is the RNLI's Operational Number of the boat carried on the hull.)	Name	Built	Class	Comments
1930–1940	725	–	Sir William Hillary	1929	Dover	60 ft (18 m) lifeboat. Assigned to the Admiralty in World War II.
1940–1941	663	–	Agnes Cross	1921	46-foot 6in Norfolk and Suffolk	Reserve lifeboat. Previously John and Mary Meiklam of Gladswood at Gorleston.
Station Closed 1941–1947
1947–1949	694	–	J.B. Proudfoot	1924	45-foot Watson	Previously H.F. Bailey at Cromer, and Reserve lifeboat at Southend-on-Sea
1949–1967	860	–	Southern Africa	1949	51-foot Barnett	
1967–1979	1003	44-004	Faithful Forester	1967	Waveney	Sold for lifeboat service in Australia.
1979–1997	1031	50-001	Rotary Service	1973	Thames	Previously at Falmouth
1997–2026	1220	17-09	City of London II	1996	Severn	Withdrawn from service at Dover on 13 May 2026
tbc	1201	17-51	"Ettrick Shepherd" Hogg Hardie	1994	Severn	(Note: First of two Severn-class lifeboats to undergo the (now abandoned) Severn Life Extension Programme (SLEP).); Formerly 17-02 The Will.

== See also ==
- List of RNLI stations
- List of former RNLI stations
- Royal National Lifeboat Institution lifeboats
