= Severn-class lifeboat =

All-weather lifeboat class of the RNLI

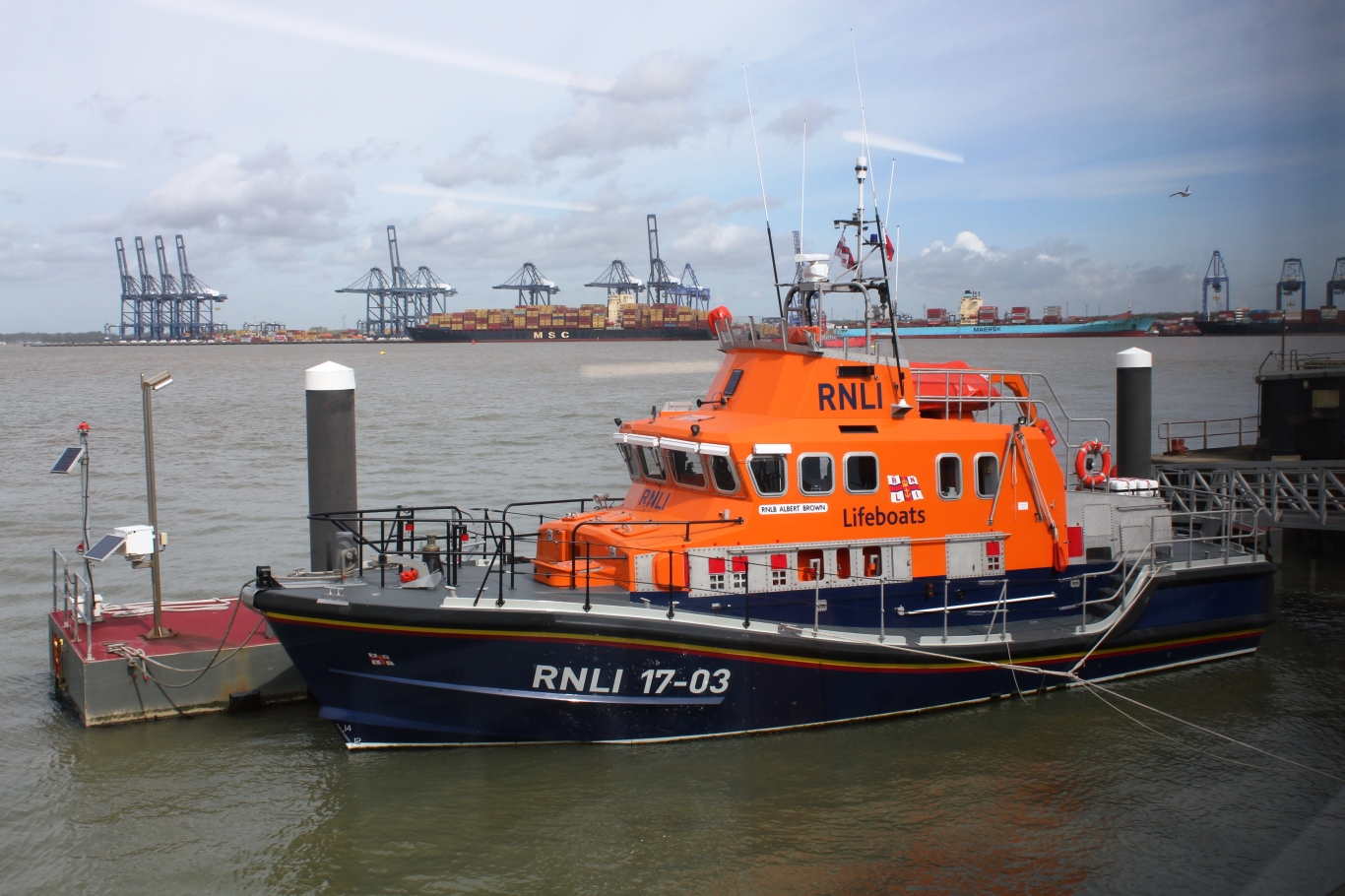
- RNLB 17-03 Albert Brown (ON 1202) at Harwich

Class overview
- Name: Severn class
- Builders: Green Marine (Hull Moldings), Lymington; Berthon Boat Co., Lymington; Halmatic, Portchester; FBM Marine, Hamble; Souters Marine, Cowes; Devonport Management Limited (DML), Plymouth
- Operators: Royal National Lifeboat Institution
- Preceded by: Arun-class
- Cost: £1.5 – £1.9 million
- Built: 1991–2004
- In service: 1996–present
- Completed: 46
- Active: On Station 34; Relief fleet 9
- Lost: 1
- Retired: 2

General characteristics
- Displacement: 40 t (39 long tons)
- Length: 17.3m (56ft 9in)
- Beam: 5.9m (19ft 4in)
- Draught: 1.78m (5ft 10in)
- Propulsion: 2 × Caterpillar 3412 TA diesel engines, 1,250 hp (932 kW) each or; 2 x MTU 10V2000 M94 engines; 1,600 hp (1,193 kW) (after re-engining); UBW 195 V reverse-reduction gearbox 2.03:1 ratio; 5,500 litre (1,200 imperial gallons) fuel capacity
- Speed: 25 knots (29 mph; 46 km/h)
- Range: 250 nmi (460 km)
- Capacity: Self-righting 47; Non-self-righting 185
- Complement: 6

The Severn class is the largest lifeboat operated by the Royal National Lifeboat Institution (RNLI). The class, which is 17.3 metres (56 ft 9 in) long, was introduced into service in 1996. It is named after the River Severn, the longest river in Great Britain. The lifeboats are stationed at 33 locations around the coasts of the Great Britain, Ireland, and the Channel Islands, and can provide coverage up to 125 nmi (232 km) out to sea.

All of the following fleet details are referenced to the 2026 Lifeboat Enthusiasts' Society Handbook, with information retrieved directly from RNLI records.

== History ==
In the 1980s the RNLI's fast Arun-class and Waveney-class all-weather lifeboats provided coverage 30 miles (48 km) out to sea, operating at up to 18 knots (33 km/h; 21 mph) to cover the distance in two hours in good weather. However, the RNLI felt that they needed the capability to extend their coverage to 50 miles (80 km) radius, which would require lifeboats with a top speed of 25 knots (46 km/h; 29 mph). This resulted in the 17-metre (56 ft) Severn and 14-metre (46 ft) Trent-class lifeboats.

The prototype Severn was launched in 1991 and named Maurice and Joyce Hardy (ON 1179). Trials started the following year and lasted until 1998. In 1995, the boat was de-named. Problems were encountered during the trials with the "skegs" that protected the propellers. These were designed to protect the hull by breaking off should the boat hit rocks, but the first ones were too easily broken. Crashing through heavy seas at full speed also caused damage to the hull, too.

The prototype was transferred to training work in 1998, renamed Peter and Marion Fulton (ON TL-02), ultimately being withdrawn in 2004, and sold in 2005. In 2008, it was in use as a dive boat at Buckie, carrying the name Gemini Storm. She was then sold to Montrose Marine Services Ltd in 2011 and renamed Eileen May. Latterly, she was sold 2019 into private ownership, last reported as a charter boat based at Dumfries.

The first production Severn was 17-02 The Will (ON 1201). It had been built in 1995 by Berthon Boat Co (Builders of 21 of the 46 Severn-class lifeboats) for Stornoway, but had to undergo several modifications before it was fit for service. It was eventually placed in the relief fleet in 1996, and shown to many lifeboat stations, where the class was expected to be deployed. The crew at Falmouth Lifeboat Station were so impressed, that they pressed the RNLI to station it there, until their own boat was built. It operated at Falmouth from January 1997 until December 2001, when it was replaced by 17-29 Richard Scott Cox (ON 1256). In the meantime, 17-18 Tom Sanderson (ON 1238) had been deployed at Stornoway in 1999. After its time at Falmouth, The Will returned to the relief fleet until 2019, when it was the first Severn Class assigned to undergo the Severn Life Extension Programme, (see below). Construction of the Severn-class continued until 2005.

In 2015, the Canadian Coast Guard commissioned a version of the Severn class, modified for the extreme conditions found off the coast of Newfoundland and Labrador and Nova Scotia. Now known as the Bay-class lifeboat, the last of 20 boats, Baie de Gaspé, was completed in 2025.

In January 2025, 17-29 Richard Scott Cox (ON 1256) was the first production Severn class to be formally retired from service.

== Description ==
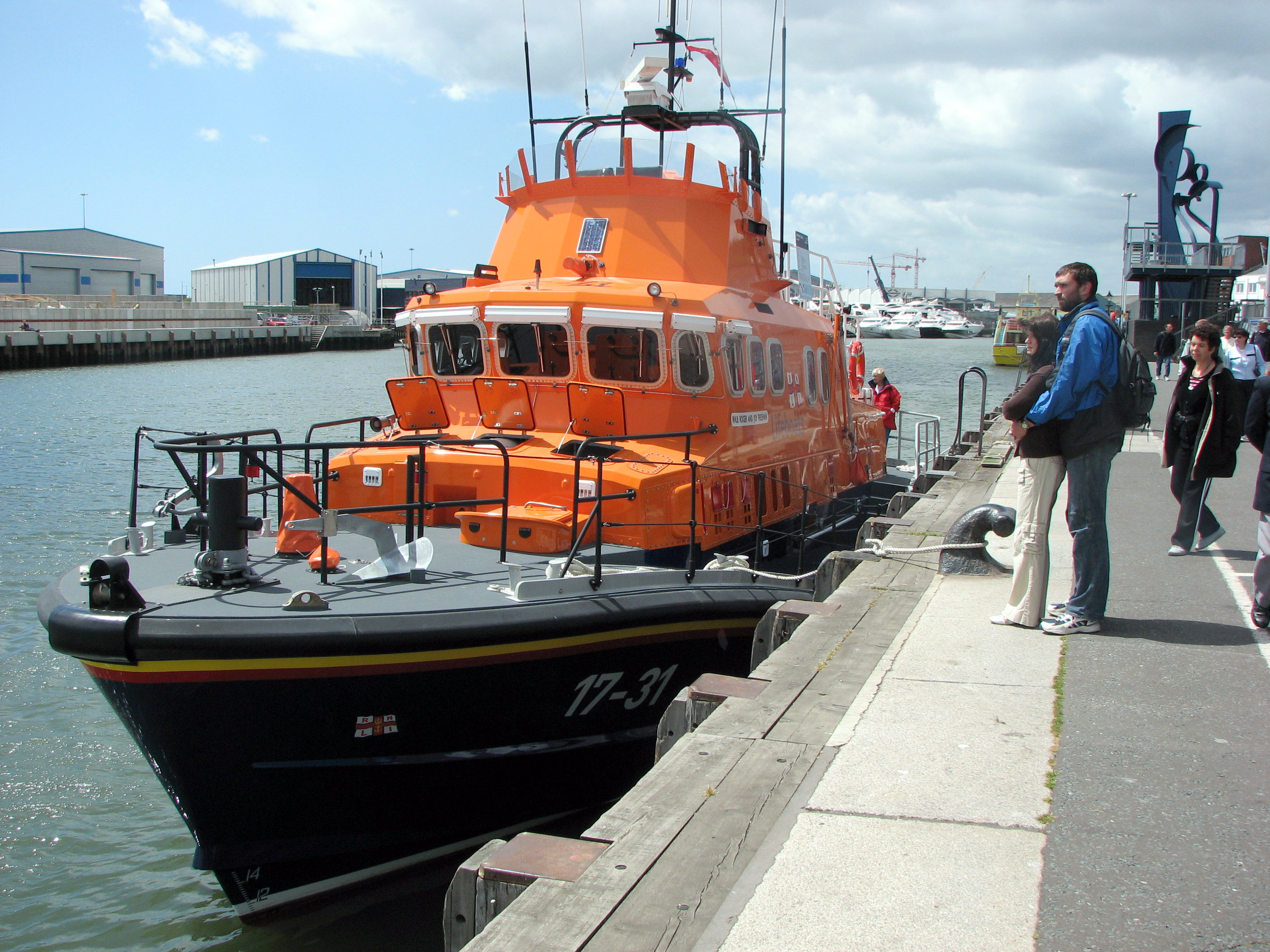
Severn-class lifeboat 17-31 alongside in Poole Harbour, Dorset, England, showing its foredeck

Severns are constructed of fibre reinforced composite material, and their hard chine semi-displacement hull is built so that it will stay afloat with two of its five compartments flooded. For added manoeuvrability, in addition to twin engines, the Severn also has a bow thruster fitted. The propellers are enclosed so that the Severn can take ground without damaging them. A Y-class inflatable boat can be deployed by an on-board crane for use in shallow water or confined spaces.

Severns have comprehensive electronics systems that include full MF and VHF DSC radio equipment, differential GPS navigator, an electronic chart system, VHF radio direction finder, radar and weather sensors. Provision for survivors includes comprehensive first aid equipment including stretchers, oxygen and Entonox. They carry a portable salvage pump in a water-tight container, and can also carry out pumping and fire-fighting tasks using the engine-driven general service pump.

== Severn Life Extension Programme ==
In 2020, the RNLI started to design a Severn Life Extension Programme (SLEP), with the intention of extending the fleet's lifespan by 25 years. This involved taking an existing boat and fully refitting it from the hull up. The addition of modern electronic systems and shock mitigating seats similar to those found on the Shannon class lifeboats were among many upgrades. In July 2022 it was announced that the prototype was almost complete and would soon be ready for sea trials.

In early 2025 the RNLI announced that, following a fleet review, the Severn Life Extension Programme would not be continued beyond the two boats already in the programme. Instead, Severn-class boats would be progressively withdrawn over the next fifteen years.

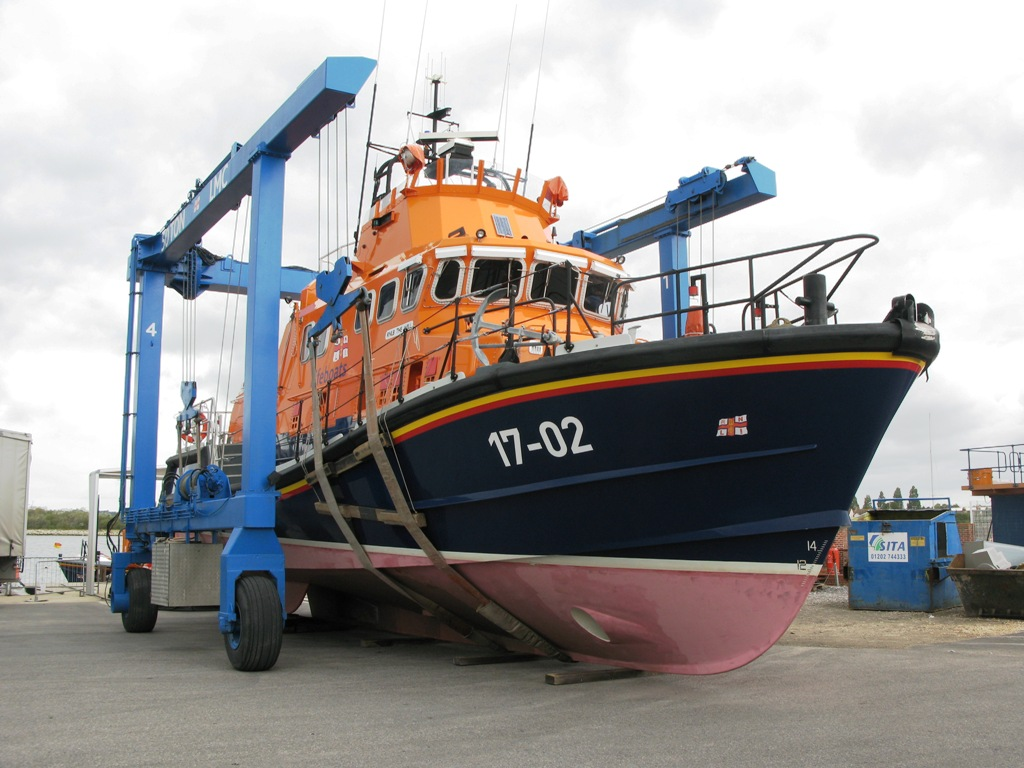
Hull with bow thruster

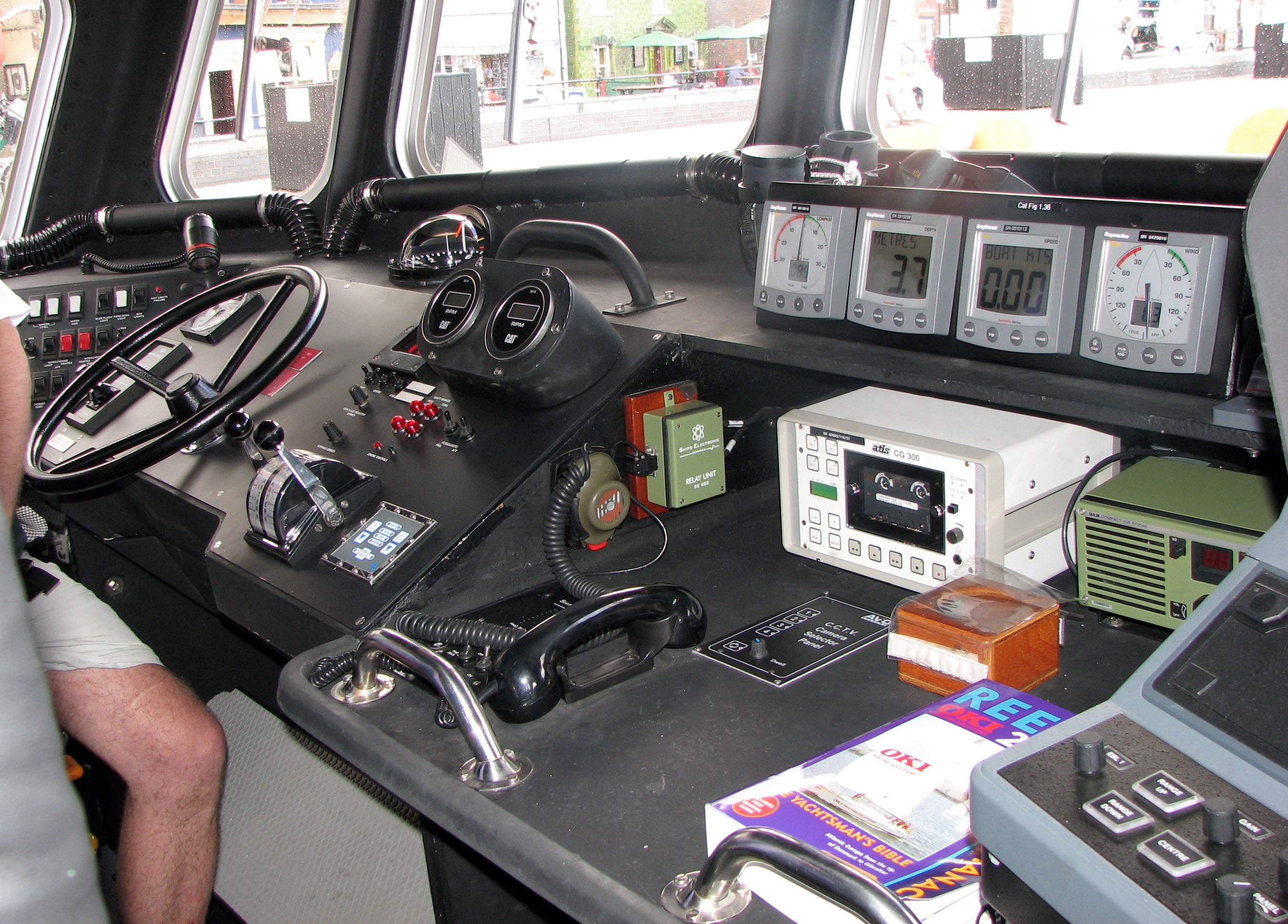
Inside helm and controls

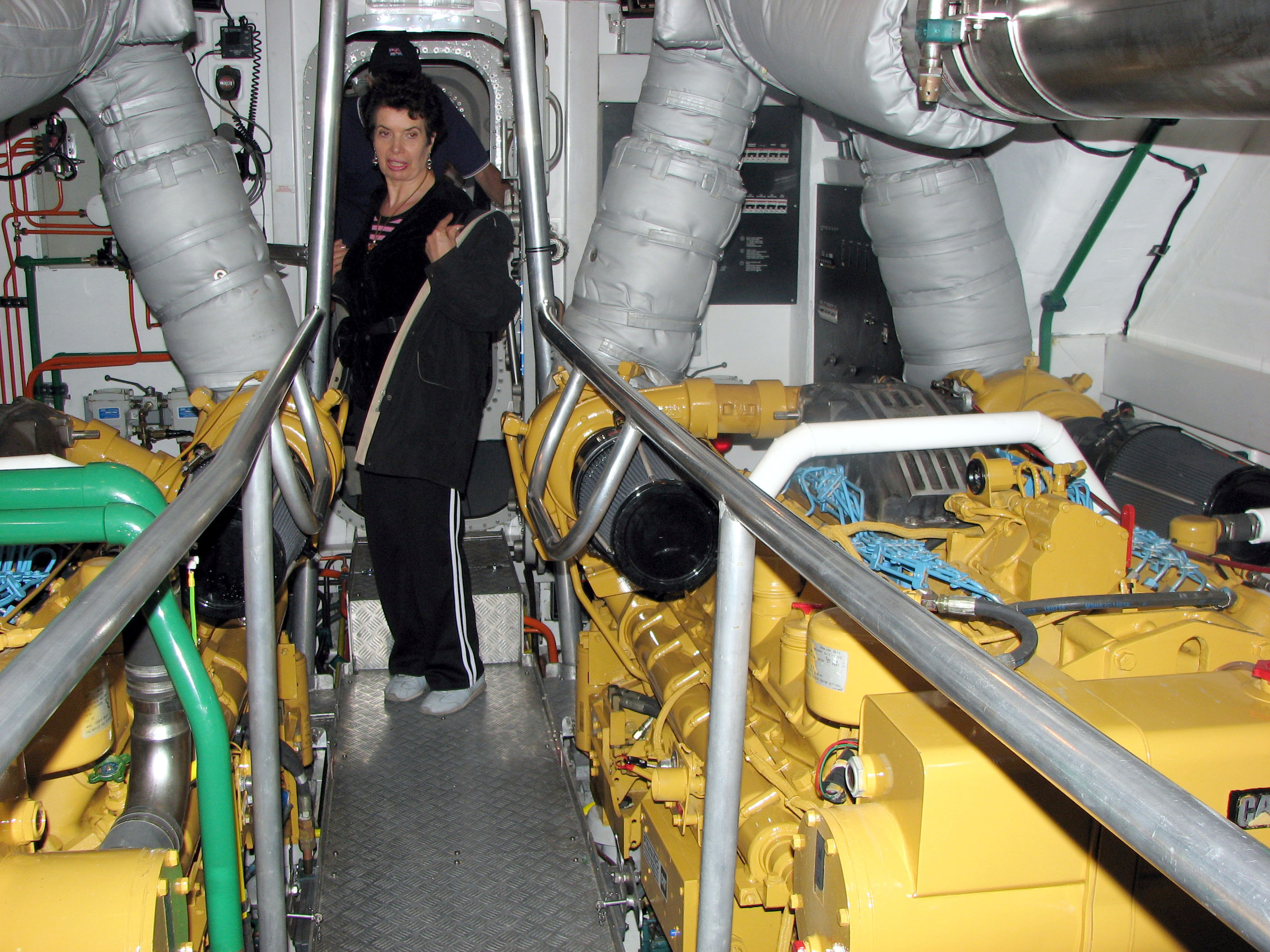
Engine room with Caterpillar 3412 TA marine diesel engines

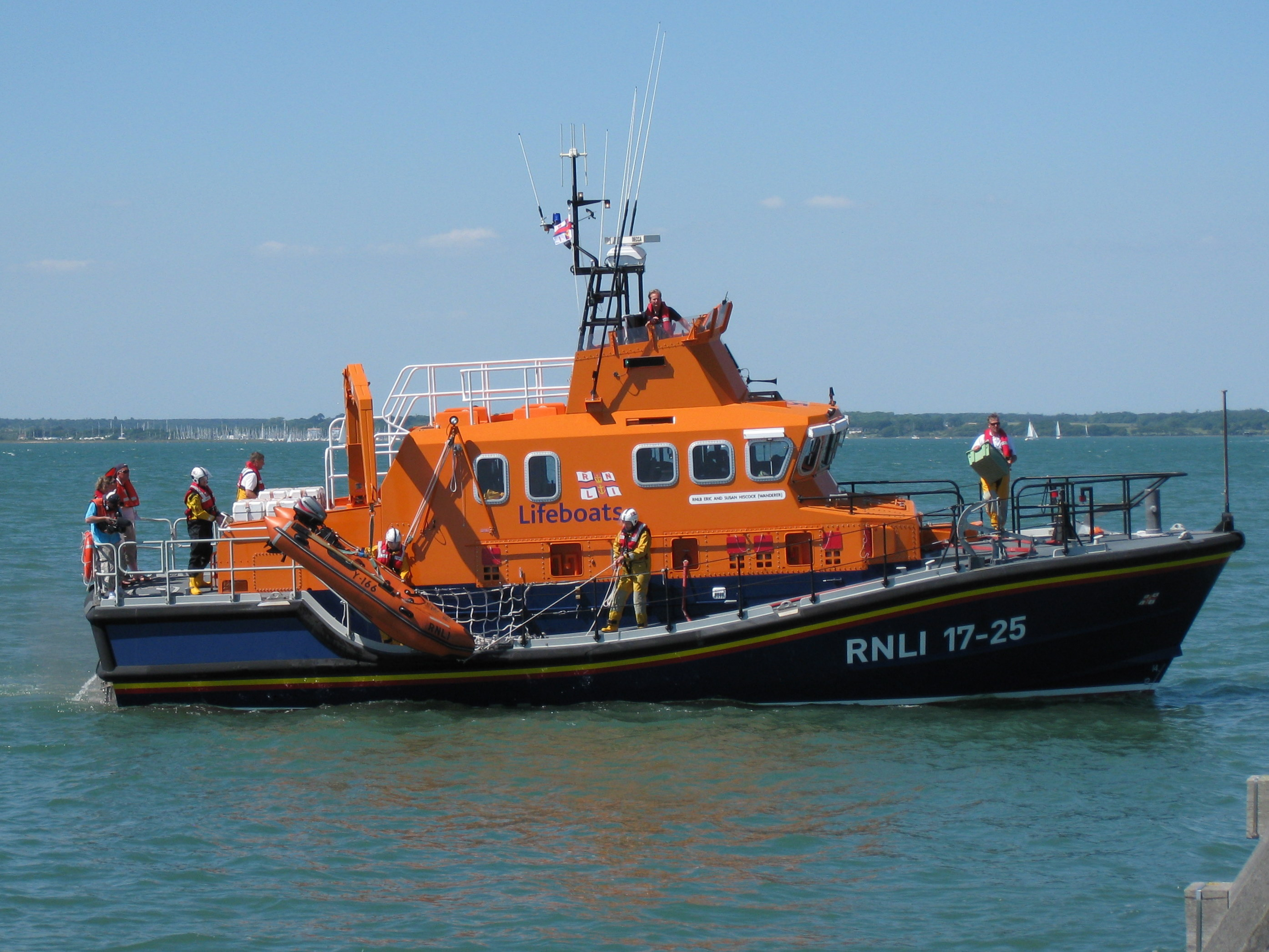
Launching inflatable boat with on-board crane

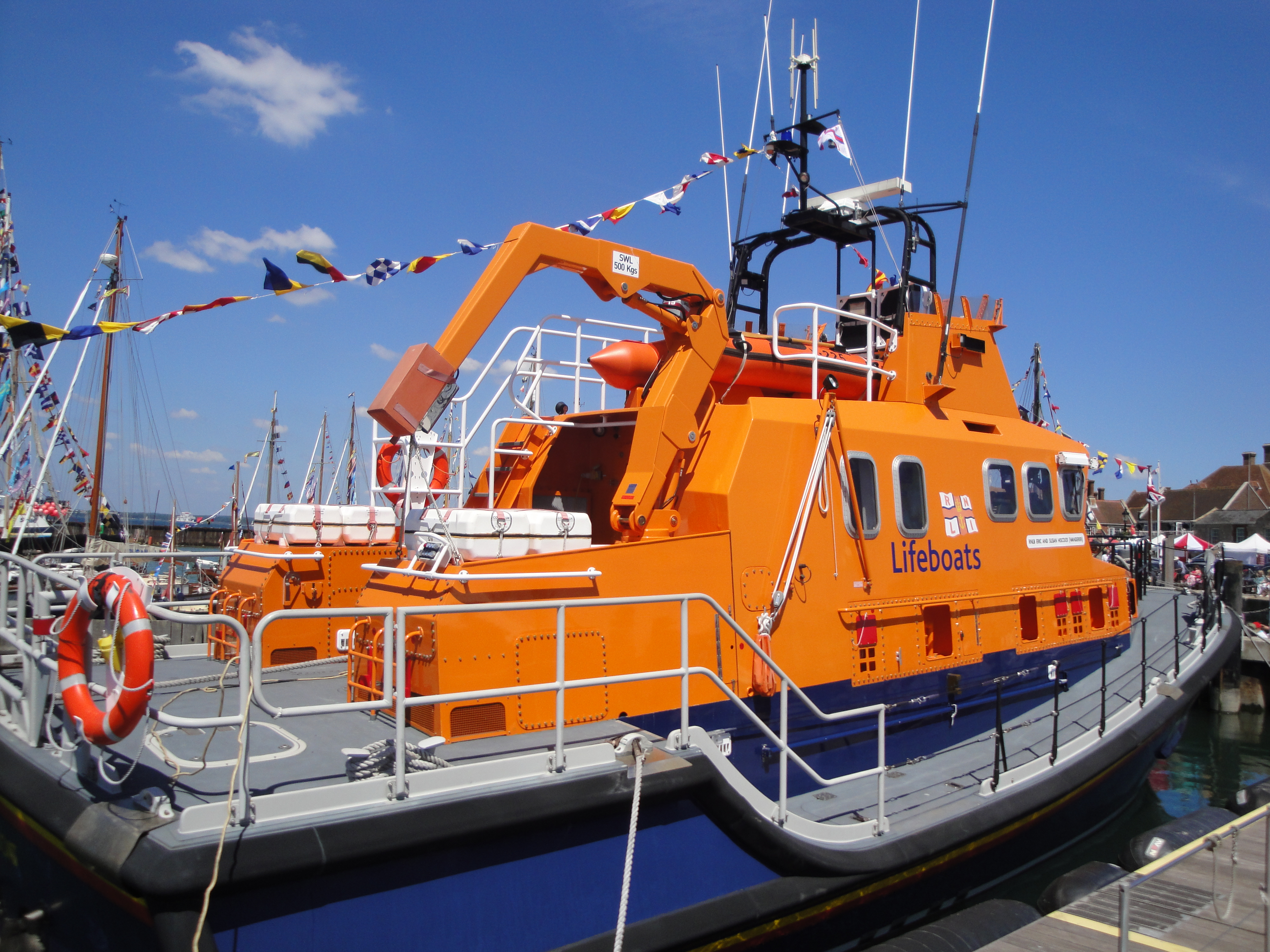
Stern quarter showing crane and inflatable boat stowed

== Severn-class lifeboat fleet ==
=== RNLI active fleet ===
ON (Note: ON is the RNLI's Official Number of the boat.)	Op. No. (Note: Op. No. is the RNLI's Operational Number of the boat carried on the hull.)	Name	Built	In service	Station (Note: (Brackets) used to signify that a boat is assigned to a specific station, but isn't yet at that location)	MMSI	Comments
1202	17-03	Albert Brown	1994	1996–	Harwich	232001910	(Note: Legacy of Mrs V. M. Brown, built by Green Marine / Berthon Boat Co., costing £1,580,000.)
1203	17-04	Spirit of Guernsey	1995	1997–	St Peter Port	232001940	(Note: Gift of the Guernsey LB appeal, plus other gifts and legacies, built by Green Marine / Halmatic, costing £1,500,000.)
1216	17-05	Pride of the Humber	1996	1997–	Humber	232002440	(Note: Gift of the Humber LB appeal, plus other gifts and legacies, built by Green Marine / Halmatic, costing £1,500,000.)
1217	17-06	David Kirkaldy	1996	1997–	Aran Islands	232002450	(Note: Gift of Mr D. Kirkaldy, built by Green Marine / Berthon Boat Co., costing £1,580,000.)
1218	17-07	John and Margaret Doig	1996	1996–	Valentia	232002460	(Note: Legacy of Miss M. Doig, plus other legacies, built by Green Marine / FBM Ltd, costing £1,580,000.)
1219	17-08	Helmut Schroder of Dunlossit II	1996	1997–	Islay	232002470	(Note: Gift of Mr B. Schroder and Mrs G. Mallinckrodt, built by Green Marine / FBM Ltd, costing £1,580,000.)
1221	17-10	Michael and Jane Vernon	1996	1997–	Lerwick	232002490	(Note: Gift of Lerwick LB Appeal, plus gifts and other legacies, built by Green Marine / FBM Ltd, costing £1,580,000.)
1229	17-11	The Whiteheads	1997	1997–	St Mary's	232003049	(Note: Legacy of Olive Elsie Whitehead, built by Green Marine / Berthon Boat Co., costing £1,725,000.)
1230	17-12	Edna Windsor	1997	1998–	Barra Island	232003050	(Note: Legacy of Mrs E. Windsor, plus other legacies, built by Green Marine / FBM Ltd, costing £1,725,000.)
1231	17-13	Margaret Foster	1997	1998–	Kirkwall	232003051	(Note: Legacy of Mrs M. E. Foster, built by Green Marine / FBM Ltd, costing £1,725,000.)
1232	17-14	Charles Lidbury	1997	1998–	Aith	232003052	(Note: Legacy of Miss M. Lidbury, plus other gifts and legacies, built by Green Marine / Berthon Boat Co., costing £1,725,000.)
1235	17-15	Bryan and Gordon	1997	1998–	Ballyglass	232003133	(Note: Legacies of Mr B. C. Griffiths and Mrs G. W. Griffiths, built by Green Marine / FBM Ltd, costing £1,725,000.)
1236	17-16	Violet Dorothy and Kathleen	1998	1998–	Stromness	232003134	(Note: Legacy of Miss V. J. Matton, built by Green Marine / Berthon Boat Co., costing £1,725,000.)
1238	17-18	Tom Sanderson	1998	1999–	Stornoway	232003136	(Note: Legacy of Mr T. Sanderson, plus other gifts and legacies, built by Green Marine / Berthon Boat Co., costing £1,725,000.); No crane.
1241	17-19	Ernest and Mary Shaw	1998	1999–	Campbeltown	232003139	(Note: Gift from the estate of the late Ernest Shaw and hs widow Mary, built by Green Marine / FBM Ltd, costing £1,725,000.)
1243	17-21	David and Elizabeth Acland	1999	1999–	Newhaven	232003141	(Note: Legacies of Mrs D. Woods, Miss M. Lamb, Mr N. Sutton, Mrs T. Young and Mr W. Holman, plus other gifts, built by Green Marine / FBM Ltd, costing £1,725,000.)
1244	17-22	Myrtle Maud	1999	2000–	Arranmore	232003142	(Note: Legacy of Mrs M. M. Campbell-Orde, plus other legacies, built by Green Marine / Berthon Boat Co., costing £1,725,000.)
1248	17-24	Bon Accord	2000	2000–	Aberdeen	232004399	(Note: Gift of the Aberdeen LB appeal, legacy of Miss Janette Reid, plus other gifts and legacies, built by Green Marine / Berthon Boat Co., costing £1,725,000.)
1249	17-25	Eric and Susan Hiscock (Wanderer)	2000	2001–	Yarmouth	232004401	(Note: Legacy of Mrs S. Hiscock, built by Green Marine / FBM Ltd, costing £1,800,000.)
1250	17-26	Henry Alston Hewat	2000	2001–	Mallaig	232004402	(Note: Legacy of Miss Catherine Hewat, plus local appeal and other gifts and legacies, built by Green Marine / Berthon Boat Co., costing £1,800,000.)
1255	17-28	Alec and Christina Dykes	2001	2001–	Torbay	232004407	(Note: Legacies of Mrs C. Dykes and Mr Robert Buchanen, plus other gifts and legacies, built by Green Marine / Berthon Boat Co., costing £1,800,000.)
1257	17-30	William Gordon Burr	2001	2002–2008	Relief fleet	232004409	(Note: Legacies of Mrs N. Burr, built by Green Marine / Berthon Boat Co., costing £1,800,000.)
1257	17-30	William Gordon Burr	2001	2008–	Portrush	232004409	(Note: Legacies of Mrs N. Burr, built by Green Marine / Berthon Boat Co., costing £1,800,000.)
1261	17-32	Ernest and Mabel	2002	2002–	Weymouth	235005118	(Note: Gift of Miss Beryl Taylor, plus other gifts and legacies, built by Green Marine / Souters, costing £1,800,000.)
1263	17-34	Osier	2002	2002–2021	Relief fleet	235005119	(Note: Gift of Mr P. A. G. Acke, built by Green Marine / DML, costing £1,900,000.)
1263	17-34	Osier	2002	2021–	Tynemouth	235005119	(Note: Gift of Mr P. A. G. Acke, built by Green Marine / DML, costing £1,900,000.)
1264	17-35	Sybil Mullen Glover	2002	2003–	Plymouth	235005121	(Note: Legacy of Mrs D. S. Glover, plus other gifts and legacies, built by Green Marine / Souters, costing £1,900,000.)
1265	17-36	Ivan Ellen	2002	2003–	Penlee	235005122	(Note: Legacies of Mr H. I. Leech, built by Green Marine / Berthon Boat Co., costing £1,900,000.)
1268	17-37	William Blannin	2002	2003–	Buckie	235007809	(Note: Legacy of Mr K. M. Williams, built by Green Marine / DML, costing £1,900,000.)
1270	17-39	Elizabeth Fairlie Ramsey	2003	2003–	Tobermory	235007798	(Note: Legacies of Mrs E. M. Ramsey, Miss J. Towers and Mrs I. P. Soular, built by Green Marine / DML, costing £1,900,000.)
1271	17-40	Julian and Margaret Leonard	2003	2003–	Lochinver	235007797	(Note: Legacies of Mr J. M. Leonard and Mrs M. Leonard, built by Green Marine / DML, costing £1,900,000.)
1273	17-42	The Taylors	2003	2004–	Thurso	235007795	(Note: Legacies of Mrs V. R. E. Taylor and Miss A. A. Cluness, built by Green Marine / DML, costing £1,900,000.)
1276	17-43	Donald and Barbara Broadhead	2004	2004–	Rosslare Harbour	235010875	(Note: Legacy of Mrs B. Broadhead, plus other gifts and legacies, built by Green Marine / Souters, costing £1,900,000.)
1277	17-44	Annette Hutton	2004	2004–	Castletownbere	235010876	(Note: Legacies of A. Hutton, plus other gifts and legacies, built by Green Marine / Berthon Boat Co., costing £1,900,000.)
1201	17-51	"Ettrick Shepherd" Hogg Hardie	1994	tbc	Dover	232001890	SLEP upgrade
1242	17-52	Owen Clarkson	1999	tbc	(Ramsgate)	232003140	SLEP upgrade

=== RNLI relief fleet ===
ON	Op. No.	Name	Built	In service	Station	MMSI	Comments
1237	17-17	Fraser Flyer (Civil Service No.43)	1998	1999–	Relief fleet	232003135	(Note: Gift of the CISPOTEL fund, plus other gifts and legacies, built by Green Marine / FBM Ltd, costing £1,725,000.)
1254	17-27	Volunteer Spirit	2000	2001–	Relief fleet	232004406	(Note: Funded by RNLI branches and guilds, to mark the RNLI 150th Anniversary, built by Green Marine / Souters, costing £1,800,000.)
1260	17-31	Roger and Joy Freeman	2002	2002–	Relief fleet	235005115	(Note: Legacies of Hilda Freeman, plus other gifts and legacies, built by Green Marine / DML, costing £1,800,000.)
1262	17-33	Beth Sell	2002	2002–	Relief fleet	235005116	(Note: Legacies of Mrs M. E. Sell and Mrs H. C. Wells, plus other legacies, built by Green Marine / Berthon Boat Co., costing £1,900,000.)
1269	17-38	Daniel L. Gibson	2002	2003–	Relief fleet	235007799	(Note: Legacies of Mr J. Gibson, built by Green Marine / Berthon Boat Co., costing £1,900,000.)
1272	17-41	Christopher Pearce	2003	2003–2024	Holyhead	235007796	(Note: Legacies of Mr C. M. Pearce, built by Green Marine / Berthon Boat Co., costing £1,900,000.)
1272	17-41	Christopher Pearce	2003	2025–	Relief fleet	235007796	(Note: Legacies of Mr C. M. Pearce, built by Green Marine / Berthon Boat Co., costing £1,900,000.)
1278	17-45	The Duke of Kent	2004	2005–	Relief fleet	235013842	(Note: Combination of six legacies, built by Green Marine / Souters, costing £1,900,000.)
1279	17-46	Margaret Joan and Fred Nye	2004	2004–2008	Relief fleet	235010878	(Note: Legacies of Miss J. Nye, Miss C. Willis, Mrs M. Howarth, and other gifts and legacies, built by Green Marine / Berthon Boat Co., costing £1,900,000.)
1279	17-46	Margaret Joan and Fred Nye	2004	2008	Portrush	235010878	(Note: Legacies of Miss J. Nye, Miss C. Willis, Mrs M. Howarth, and other gifts and legacies, built by Green Marine / Berthon Boat Co., costing £1,900,000.)
1279	17-46	Margaret Joan and Fred Nye	2004	2008–	Relief fleet	235010878	(Note: Legacies of Miss J. Nye, Miss C. Willis, Mrs M. Howarth, and other gifts and legacies, built by Green Marine / Berthon Boat Co., costing £1,900,000.)

=== RNLI retired fleet ===
ON	Op. No.	Name	Built	In service	Station	Comments
1179	17-01	Maurice and Joyce Hardy	1991	1992–1995	Trials	(Note: Funded by the RNLI, built by Halmatic / Osborne, costing £1,350,000.); Name removed in 1995.
1179	17-01	Unnamed	1991	1995–1998	Trials	Renamed Peter and Marion Fulton in 1998
1179	TL-02	Peter and Marion Fulton	1991	1998–2004	Training fleet	Sold in 2005. Renamed Gemini Storm. Now as Eileen May, last reported as a charter boat at Dumfries, August 2025. MMSI 232034092
1201	17-02	The Will	1994	1996–1997	Relief fleet	(Note: Gift of 'The Will' Charitable Trust, built by Green Marine / Berthon Boat Co., costing £1,580,000.); Identity retired, SLEP Programme, 17-02 becomes 17-51.
1201	17-02	The Will	1994	1997–2001	Falmouth	Identity retired, SLEP Programme, 17-02 becomes 17-51.
1201	17-02	The Will	1994	2001–2019	Relief fleet	Identity retired, SLEP Programme, 17-02 becomes 17-51.
1220	17-09	City of London II	1996	1997–2026	Dover	(Note: Gift of the City of London Centenary Appeal, plus gifts and other legacies, built by Green Marine / Berthon Boat Co., costing £1,580,000.); Withdrawn from service 13 May 2026. MMSI 232002480 At RNLI College in Poole with her numbers removed, 25 July 2026.
1242	17-20	Spirit of Northumberland	1999	1999–2021	Tynemouth	(Note: Funded by Regional Appeal, built by Green Marine / Berthon Boat Co., costing £1,750,000.); Identity retired, SLEP Programme, 17-20 becomes 17-52.
1247	17-23	Katie Hannan	2000	2000–2008	Portrush	(Note: Legacy of Mrs K. Hannan and the Portrush LB Appeal, built by Green Marine / FBM Ltd, costing £1,750,000.); Damaged beyond economic repair after grounding on Rathlin Island.
1256	17-29	Richard Cox Scott	2001	2001–2025	Falmouth	(Note: Legacy of Mrs R. M. Scott, built by Green Marine / Souters, costing £1,800,000.); Withdrawn from service, 24 January 2025. MMSI 232004408. For Sale, May 2026.
