= List of local nature reserves in Wales =

The following is a list of local nature reserves in Wales.

Site Name	Authority	Date	Area (ha)
Allt-yr-yn	Newport	1995	19.98
Alyn Waters	Wrexham	1999	31.09
Ashpits Pond	Carmarthenshire	2006	11.96
Bishop's Wood	Swansea	1976	17.98
Bodlondeb Woods	Conwy	2007	7.62
Brickfields Pond	Denbighshire	1997	5.87
Bryn Euryn	Conwy	1999	24.3
Cadle Heath	Swansea	1996	11.58
Carreg Cennen Woodlands	Carmarthenshire	1976	16.13
Church Wood and Spring Vale Ponds	Torfaen	2008	16.35
Cleddon Bog	Monmouthshire	1970	14.98
Cliff Wood	Glamorgan	1970	10.94
Coed Cyrnol	Anglesey	2005	5.28
Coed Dinorwig	Gwynedd	1976	48.82
Coed y Cerrig	Powys	1977	5.63
Cosmeston Lakes Country Park	Vale of Glamorgan	2013	110.00
Craig y Parciau Woodland	Bridgend	1994	3.1
Craig yr Hesg	Rhondda Cynon Taf	2008	19.21
Cwm Nofydd a Fforest Ganol	Cardiff	1995	53.09
Cwm Taf Fechan Woodlands	Merthyr Tydfil	1975	41.32
Cwm Talog woodlands	Glamorgan	1977	2.77
Cwm Llwyd wood	Swansea	1981	6.14
Cwm Llwydrew meadows	Caerphilly	2001	4.38
Cwmynyscoy quarry	Torfaen	2008	5.25
Cycle path from Blaenavon	Torfaen	2008	17.74
Cytir Mawr	Anglesey	2006	6.44
Dudley Quarry	Gwynedd	1994	16.08
Fairy Glen	Conwy	2004	3.13
Flat Holm	Cardiff	1977	34.01
Flatwood Meadow	Caerphilly	1995	3.46
Foryd Bay	Gwynedd	1993	304.73
Freshwater East	Pembrokeshire	2007	41.01
Frog Pond Wood	Bridgend	1994	2.8
Garn Lakes	Torfaen	2008	52.96
Gathering Grounds Woods	Flintshire	2000	5.03
Glamorganshire Canal	Cardiff	1981	35.01
Glan yr Afon	Carmarthenshire	2007	12.51
Glyn Cornel Grounds	Rhondda Cynon Taf	1998	35.67
Graig Goch	Caerphilly	1994	14.33
Great Ormes Head	Conwy	1981	183.2
Gronant Dunes	Denbighshire	1999	188.09
Henllys Open Space	Torfaen	2008	7.44
Hermit Wood	Cardiff	1985	1.47
Howardian	Cardiff	1991	13
Kenfig	Bridgend	1978	628.89
Killay Marsh	Swansea	1996	8.31
Kinmel Dunes	Conwy	1999	6.75
Llanddona Common	Anglesey	2002	16.29
Llangoed Common	Anglesey	2002	6.1
Locks Common	Bridgend	2003	34.43
Lôn Cob Bach	Gwynedd	1996	11.7
Memorial Park Meadows	Caerphilly	1994	7.34
Moel Findeg	Denbighshire	1999	21.33
Mumbles Hill	Swansea	1991	21.67
Mynydd Marian	Conwy	2005	11.54
Nant y Coed	Conwy	2000	8.89
North Rock Dunes	Carmarthenshire	2006	4.18
Pant-y-Sais	Neath Port Talbot	1984	18.92
Parc Bryn Bach	Blaenau Gwent	2000	75.32
Parc y Borth	Gwynedd	1996	6.88
Pembrey Burrows	Carmarthenshire	1993	250.81
Pen y Banc	Gwynedd	1996	20.13
Pendinas	Ceredigion	1999	40.49
Penglais	Ceredigion	1995	10.54
Pwll Du Cliffs	Swansea	1996	18.76
Pwllycrochan Woods	Conwy	2000	20.45
Silent Valley	Blaenau Gwent	1997	51.82
Swansea Canal	Neath Port Talbot	1987	3.56
Talybont Reservoir	Powys	1975	195.12
Tirpentwys	Torfaen	2008	33.86
Traeth Lafan	Conwy	2006	2637.01
Trwyn yr Wylfa	Anglesey	2004	13.49
Upper Till Dingle Woods	Conwy	2007	1.48
Y Dingle	Anglesey	1995	8.52
