= Cemlyn Lifeboat Station =

Former lifeboat station in Anglesey, Wales

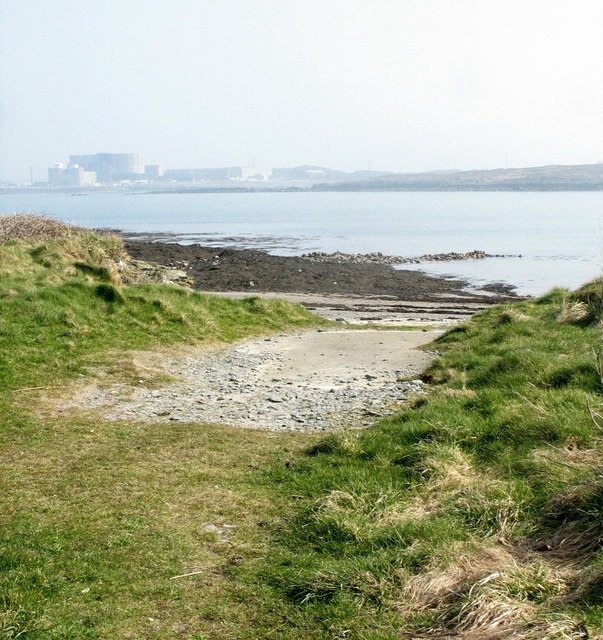
- Remains of Cemlyn Lifeboat Slipway

- Cemlyn, Anglesey

General information
- Status: Closed
- Type: RNLI Lifeboat Station
- Location: Cemlyn Bay, Cemlyn, Anglesey, LL67 0DY, Wales
- Coordinates: 53°24′50.7″N 4°30′51.3″W
- Opened: 1828–1872; 1877–1919
- Closed: 1919

Cemlyn Lifeboat Station was located on the west side of Cemlyn Bay, near the village of Cemlyn, on the north coast of Anglesey, Wales.

A lifeboat was first stationed at Cemlyn by the Anglesey Association for the Preservation of Life from Shipwreck in 1828. Management of the station was transferred to the Royal National Lifeboat Institution (RNLI) in 1855.

Cemlyn Lifeboat Station was closed in 1919.

== History ==
In 1828, the Anglesey Association for the Preservation of Life from Shipwreck (AAPLS) was founded by the Rev. James Williams and Mrs Frances Williams, of Llanfair-yng-Nghornwy, Anglesey. On 26 March 1823, they had witnessed the loss of 140 lives from the wreck of the vessel Alert, and spent the following five years raising funds and gaining support for a lifeboat service.

With the help of the Royal National Institute for the Preservation of Life from Shipwreck (RNIPLS), they managed to purchase a lifeboat for Cemlyn. A 25-foot 8in non-self-righting lifeboat costing £55 was constructed by Harton of Limehouse, London, arriving on 3 November 1828. The Rev. Owen Lloyd Williams, James' son, was appointed Coxswain.

When the steamship Leeds hit Harry Furlong Rocks, the Cemlyn lifeboat was launched, but another steamship Commerce had come to her aid. The majority of passengers transferred between ship in small boats, but one boat got away, unable to reach land or the Commerce. In dangerous conditions, the Cemlyn lifeboat managed to rescue the three men on board. For this service, Coxswain Owen Lloyd Williams was awarded the RNIPLS Silver Medal.

On 18 December 1845, the barque Frankland, on passage from Bahia, Brazil to Liverpool, was driven ashore and wrecked at Cemaes Bay. For their gallantry in rescuing 18 crew, RNIPLS Silver Medals were awarded to crew members Robert Griffiths, Richard Owen and Owen Highland.

In 1853, Cemlyn's lifeboat was transferred to Rhoscolyn, and the Moelfre lifeboat was relocated to Cemlyn. Another 'Palmer' 26-foot non-self-righting boat, built by Harton of Limehouse, London, this lifeboat would be launched nine times, and rescue 18 people, during her 12-year period on service at Cemlyn.

In 1854, the RNIPLS changed its name to become the Royal National Lifeboat Institution, and in 1855, all six lifeboat stations of the AAPLS, Cemlyn (no.1), Holyhead (no.2), Rhoscolyn (no.3), Penmon (no.4), Llanddwyn (no.5) and Moelfre (no.6), were transferred over to the management of the RNLI.

It was common for the RNLI to supply a replacement lifeboat when they took over management of a station, but the Cemlyn lifeboat must have been in good condition, as it was 1865 before it was replaced. A 30-foot self-righting 'Pulling and Sailing' (P&S) lifeboat, one with both sails and (10) oars, was transported to Holyhead free of charge by the London and North Western Railway. The lifeboat had previously served at Tenby. and was named Sophia.

By 1872, raising a crew at Cemlyn was getting so difficult, that the RNLI decided to close the station, and open a new one a few miles along the coast at Cemaes. The Cemlyn lifeboat Sophia was transferred to Cemaes. However, within just a few years, sufficient numbers of experienced men had returned to Cemlyn, that it was requested that the station be reopened. A new boathouse was constructed, and a 32-foot self-righting (P&S) lifeboat arrived in October 1877. Provided by the Loyal Order of Ancient Shepherds (Ashton Unity), the boat was named Good Shepherd.

Four further lifeboats would serve at Cemlyn, but calls became fewer. A Steam-class powered lifeboat had been stationed at Holyhead in 1897, and a gradual switch from sailing vessels to powered vessels resulted in less shipwrecks. Between 1904 and 1919, the lifeboat was called just seven times, and no lives were saved. In 1919, it was decided to close Cemlyn Lifeboat station.

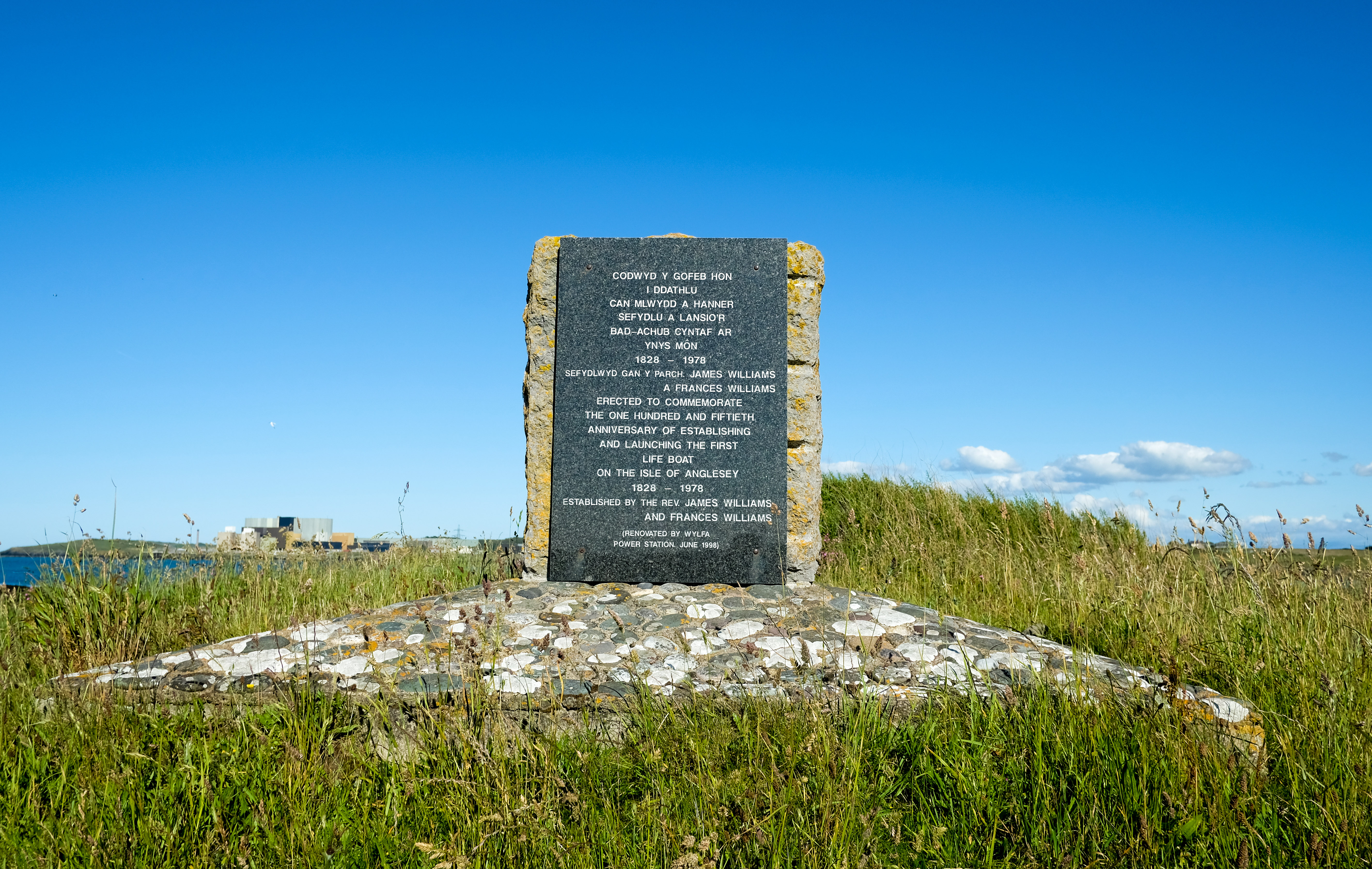
Cemlyn Lifeboat Memorial

The last boat on station, Sir John (ON 408) was transferred to the relief fleet, before being sold in 1926.

Very little evidence remains of any boathouse at Cemlyn, just part of a launchway.

In 1978, a memorial was erected near the site of the former lifeboat station, to commemorate both the 150th anniversary of Cemlyn Lifeboat Station, the first one on Anglesey, and also the founders of the station and the AAPLS, Rev. James and Mrs Frances Williams.

== Station honours ==
The following are awards made at Cemlyn.

- RNIPLS Silver Medal

Rev. Owen Lloyd Williams, Coxswain – 1835

Robert Griffiths, Seaman, crew member – 1846
Owen Highland, Landsman, crew member – 1846
Richard Owen, Seaman, crew member – 1846

- The Thanks of the Institution inscribed on Vellum

Rev. Owen Lloyd Williams, Coxswain – 1853

Rev. Owen Lloyd Williams, Coxswain – 1854
Augustine Vincent, Officer, P&O Steam Navigation Co. – 1854

== Roll of honour ==
In memory of those lost whilst serving Cemlyn lifeboat.

- Taken ill after suffering from exposure whilst on service to the steamship Olive of Sligo, 6 September 1908, and died 11 months later, in August 1909.

John Williams, Coxswain (68)

== Cemlyn lifeboats ==
ON (Note: ON is the RNLI's Official Number of the boat.)	Name	Built	On station	Class	Comments
Pre-131	Unnamed	1828	1828–1853	26-foot Palmer	(Note: 26-foot 3in x 6-foot (5/6-oared) Palmer-class non-self-righting lifeboat, provided by the AAPLS, built by Harton of Limehouse, London, costing £55.)
Pre-262	Unnamed	1853	1853	26-foot Peake Self-righting (P&S)	(Note: 27-foot x 7-foot 6in (8-oared) Peake-class self-righting lifeboat, provided by the RNLI, built by Forrestt of Limehouse, London, costing £125.); Transferred to Ardrossan.
Pre-151	Unnamed	1830	1853–1865	26-foot Palmer	(Note: 26-foot x 6-foot (6-oared) Palmer-class non-self-righting lifeboat, Provided by the AAPLS, built by Harton of Limehouse, London, costing £60.); Previously at Penmon and Moelfre.
Pre-306	Sophia	1856	1865–1872	30-foot Peake Self-righting (P&S)	(Note: 30-foot x 6-foot (6-oared) Peake-class self-righting (P&S) lifeboat, gift of Mrs Col. Vernon, built by Forrestt of Limehouse, London, costing £133 when new.); Previously Albert Edward at Padstow.
Station Closed 1872–1877
Pre-609	Good Shepherd	1876	1877–1888	32-foot Prowse Self-righting (P&S)	(Note: 32-foot x 7-foot 6in (10-oared) Prowse-class self-righting (P&S) lifeboat, gift of the Loyal Order of Ancient Shepherds, built by Woolfe of Shadwell, London, costing £267.)
154	Good Shepherd	1887	1888–1890	34-foot Self-righting (P&S)	(Note: 34-foot x 8-foot (10-oared) self-righting (P&S) lifeboat, gift of the Loyal Order of Ancient Shepherds, built by Watkins and Co. of Blackwall, London, costing £399.); Renamed B. J. Nicholson in 1890.
154	B. J. Nicholson	1887	1890–1904	34-foot Self-righting (P&S)	(Note: Gift of Mrs Nicholson of Thornton Heath.)
57	Annie Collin	1885	1904–1913	34-foot Self-righting (P&S)	(Note: 34-foot x 8-foot (10-oared) self-righting (P&S) lifeboat, legacy of Miss A. Collin of London, built by Forrestt of Limehouse, London, costing £368 when new.); Previously at Tenby and Bull Bay.
?	Unknown	?	1913–1914	Relief lifeboat	
408	Sir John	1897	1914–1919	35-foot Self-righting (P&S)	(Note: 35-foot x 8-foot 3in (10-oared) self-righting (P&S) lifeboat, gift of Mr H. Blackwood of Leamington, built by Thames Ironworks of Blackwall, London, costing £645.); Previously at Sutton

Station Closed, 1919

Pre ON numbers are unofficial numbers used by the Lifeboat Enthusiast Society to reference early lifeboats not included on the official RNLI list.

== See also ==
- List of RNLI stations
- List of former RNLI stations
- Royal National Lifeboat Institution lifeboats
