= Cemaes Lifeboat Station =

Former RNLI lifeboat station in Anglesey, Wales

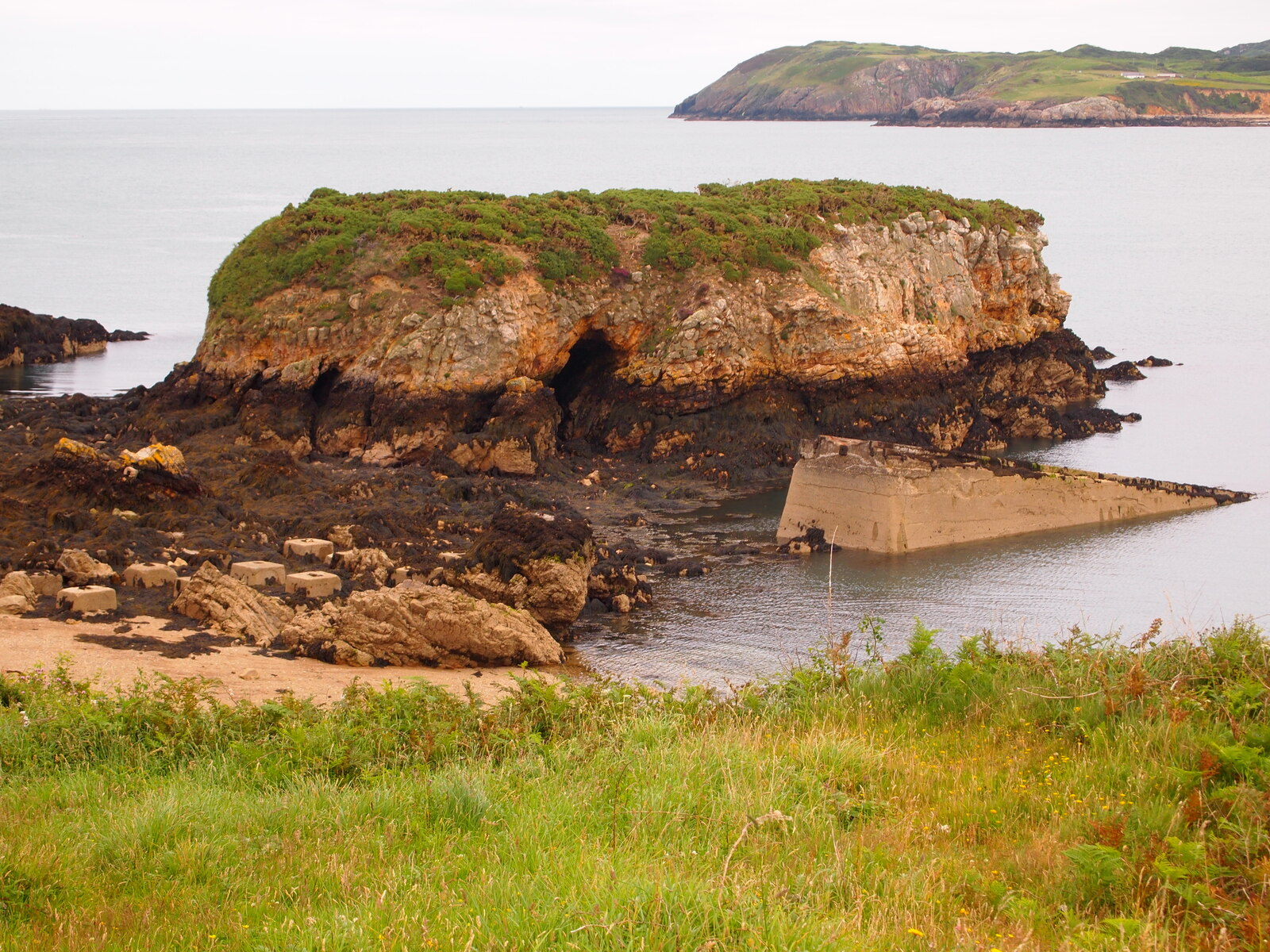
- Remains of 1907 Cemaes Lifeboat Slipway

- Cemaes, Anglesey

General information
- Status: Closed
- Type: RNLI Lifeboat Station
- Location: Porth yr Ogof, Cemaes Bay, Cemaes, Anglesey, LL67 0DE, Wales
- Coordinates: 53°25′07.6″N 4°28′33.1″W
- Opened: 1872
- Closed: 1932

Cemaes Lifeboat Station was located in Porth yr Ogof cove, Trwyn yr Wylfa (Wylfa Head), on the west side of Cemaes Bay, near the fishing port village of Cemaes, on the north coast of Anglesey, Wales.

A lifeboat station was first established at Cemaes by the Royal National Lifeboat Institution (RNLI) in 1872, when the station at Cemlyn was closed for the first time.

After few launches and no rescues in the preceding 25 years, Cemaes Lifeboat Station was closed in 1932.

== History ==
Ever since its founding in 1824, the Royal National Institution for the Preservation of Life from Shipwreck (RNIPLS), later to become the RNLI in 1854, would award medals for deeds of gallantry at sea, even if no lifeboats were involved.

On 22 September 1827, a coastguard boat saved the lives of four men and a boy from the sloop Phœnix, which had wrecked on West Mouse Rock. Coastguard Chief Officer Henry Deane was awarded the RNIPLS Silver Medal.

The Belfast vessel Active was driven ashore at Cemaes Bay by a storm on 7 March 1835. The Rev. James Williams of Llanfair-yng-Nghornwy, founder of the Anglesey Association for the Preservation of Life from Shipwreck, arrived on scene to find that several attempts to launch a boat to the aid of the vessel had been unsuccessful. At great personal risk, Williams rode his horse into the surf, managing to get a line to the vessel. All five crew were rescued. Rev. Williams was awarded the RNIPLS Gold Medal.

Rev. Williams had founded the first Anglesey lifeboat station in 1928, only a few miles away at Cemlyn, but it was not until 1872 that a lifeboat station would be opened at Cemaes, and only then because of the closure of the Cemlyn station, due to difficulties maintaining a crew. A boathouse was constructed at Porth Yr Ogof cove, at a cost of £182, with the Cemlyn lifeboat Sophia being transferred to Cemaes in June 1872.

Sophia was only on station for four years, before being replaced by a new 30 ft (9.1 m) self-righting lifeboat named Ashtonian, provided from the legacy of Mr George Higginbottom of Ashton-under-Lyne.

On 14 October 1877, Ashtonian was called to the Sarah, a full-rigged sailing ship on passage from Quebec to Liverpool, aground on Middle Mouse Rocks. 18 men were rescued from the vessel. The Ashtonian would be launched eight times in the five years on station, and rescue 33 lives.

Three more lifeboats would be placed on service at Cemaes. In 1881, a 32 ft (9.8 m) lifeboat, costing £286-15s-0d, also being named Ashtonian. Then followed the 34-foot George Evans (ON 132) in 1887, which had been provided from the legacy of Mrs Evans, the boat named after her late husband, Admiral George Evans, Conservator of the River Mersey. Finally, in 1907, the Charles Henry Ashley (ON 583), a 38 ft (12 m) non-self-righting Watson-class P&S lifeboat. It was one of ten lifeboats provided by the legacy of £65,000, from the estate of Charles Carr Ashley, late of Menton, France.

A new boathouse with roller-slipway was constructed in 1907 to house the 38 ft (12 m) Charles Henry Ashley, at a cost of £3,840. It was located just along the beach from the former boathouse at Porth yr Ogof, in the shadow of Ynys Yr Ŵyn, on a site granted by Mrs Hughes and the Wylfa estate trustees.

In 25 years on station, the lifeboat was launched just seven times, with no rescues. At a meeting of the RNLI committee of management on 15 October 1931, it was decided that the Cemaes Lifeboat Station should close in March 1932. Charles Henry Ashley was retired in 1932, and the station was closed.

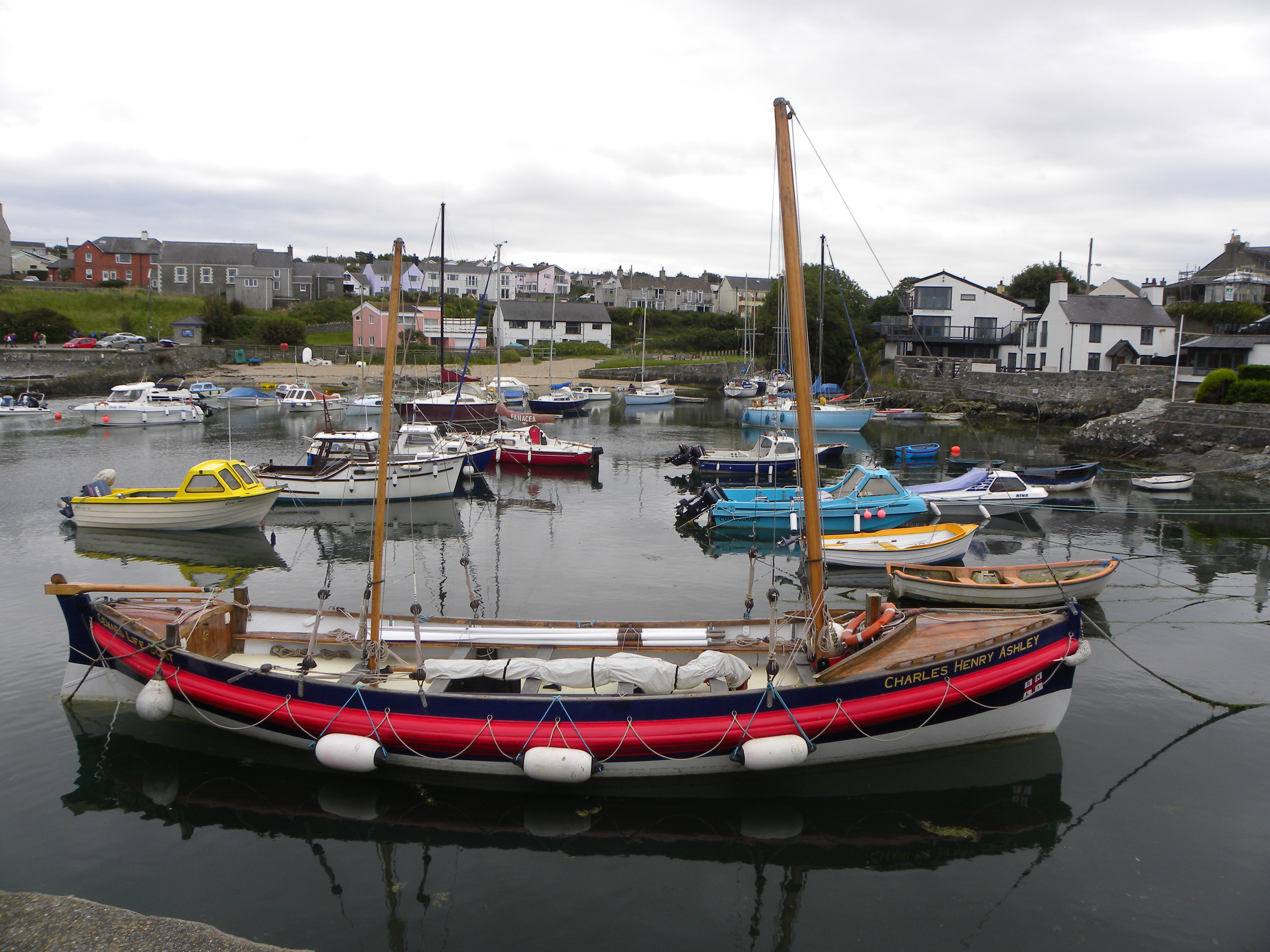
Charles Henry Ashley (ON 583) in Cemaes harbour

In operation for 60 years, the Cemaes lifeboat was launched 60 times, and rescued 42 lives.

Today, little evidence of the station buildings remains, although the base of the pilings and the concrete foot of the slipway of the 1907 boathouse are clearly visible.

The Charles Henry Ashley (ON 583) was sold into private ownership in 1932. The boat ultimately fell into disrepair, but was saved from being broken up, and relaunched in 2009 after a full restoration by the Cemaes Boat Club.

In 2024, it was announced that the Charles Henry Ashley was being retired from sea-going activity, due to the deterioration of the hull.

== Station honours ==
The following are awards made at Cemaes:

- RNIPLS Gold Medal

Rev. James Williams – 1835

- RNIPLS Silver Medal

Henry Deane, Chief Officer, H.M. Coastguard, Cemaes – 1827

== Cemaes lifeboats ==
=== Pulling and Sailing (P&S) lifeboats ===
ON (Note: ON is the RNLI's Official Number of the boat.)	Name	Built	On station	Class	Comments
Pre-306	Sophia	1856	1872–1876	30-foot Peake Self-righting (P&S)	(Note: 30-foot x 6-foot (6-oared) Peake-class self-righting (P&S) lifeboat, gift of Mrs Col. Vernon, built by Forrestt of Limehouse, London, costing £133 when new.); Previously Albert Edward at Padstow, and Sophia at Cemlyn.
Pre-615	Ashtonian	1876	1876–1881	30-foot Montrose Self-righting (P&S)	(Note: 30-foot x 8-foot (8-oared) Montrose-class self-righting (P&S) lifeboat, gift of Mr G. Higginbottom of Ashton-under-Lyne, built by Woolfe of Shadwell, London, costing £275.)
Pre-656	Ashtonian	1881	1881–1887	32-foot Prowse Self-righting (P&S)	(Note: 32-foot x 7-foot 6in (10-oared) Prowse-class self-righting (P&S) lifeboat, gift of Mr G. Higginbottom of Ashton-under-Lyne, built by Woolfe of Shadwell, London, costing £287.)
132	George Evans	1887	1887–1907	34-foot Self-righting (P&S)	(Note: 34-foot x 8-foot (10-oared) self-righting (P&S) lifeboat, legacy of Mrs M. H. D. Evans of Liverpool, built by Edwards and Symes of Millwall, costing £445.)
583	Charles Henry Ashley	1907	1907–1932	38-foot Watson (P&S)	(Note: 38-foot x 9-foot 4in (12-oared) Watson-class non-self-righting (P&S) lifeboat, legacy of Mr C. C. Ashley of Menton, France, built by Thames Ironworks of Blackwall, London, costing £1,090.)

Pre ON numbers are unofficial numbers used by the Lifeboat Enthusiasts' Society to reference early lifeboats not included on the official RNLI list.

== See also ==
- List of RNLI stations
- List of former RNLI stations
- Royal National Lifeboat Institution lifeboats
