= Rhoscolyn Lifeboat Station =

Former lifeboat station in Anglesey, Wales

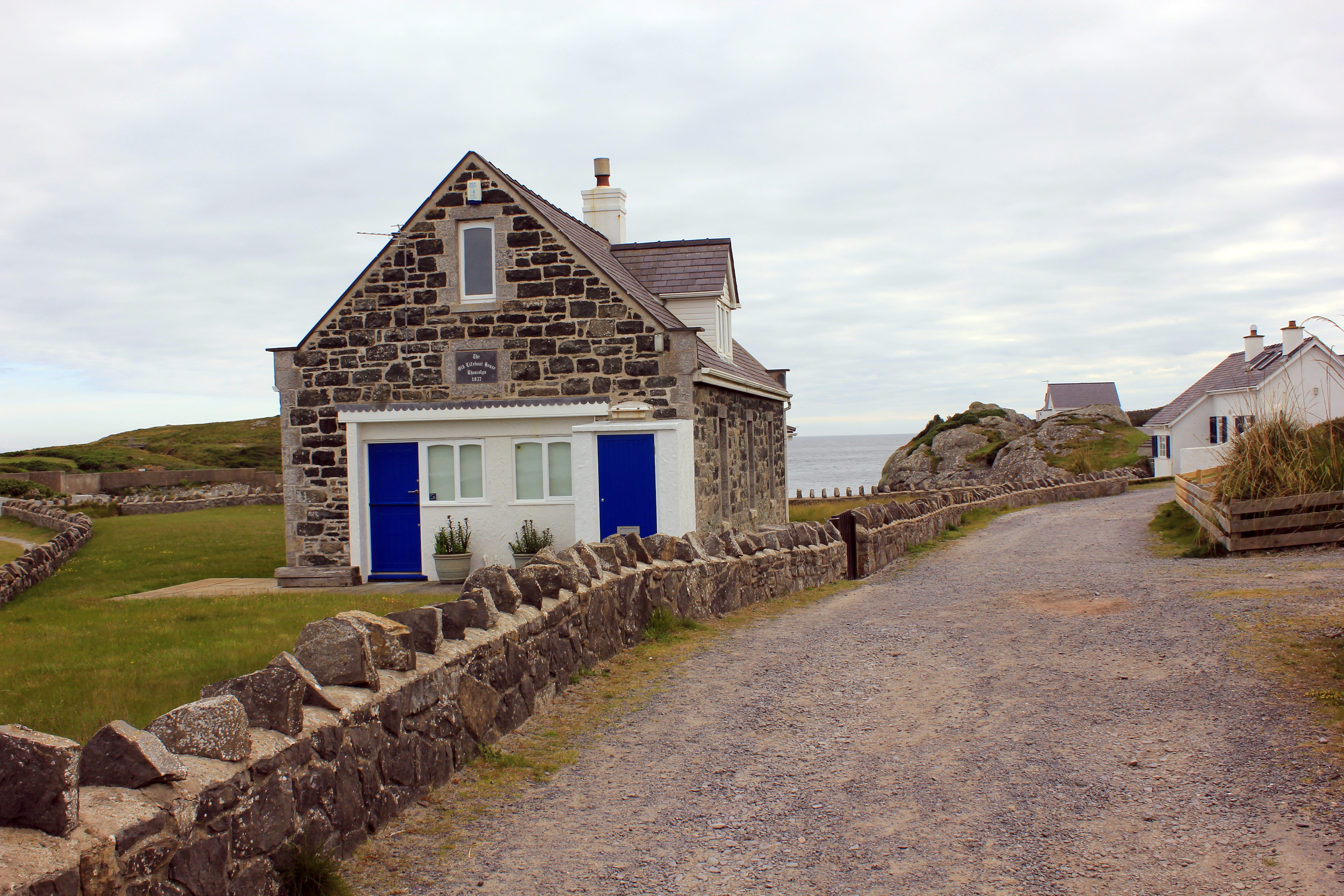
- 1877 Rhoscolyn Lifeboat House

- Location within Anglesey

General information
- Status: Closed
- Type: RNLI Lifeboat Station
- Location: Lifeboat House, Rhoscolyn, Anglesey, LL65 2NX, Wales
- Coordinates: 53°14′28.9″N 4°35′30.2″W
- Opened: 1830
- Closed: 1929

Rhoscolyn Lifeboat Station was located at Porth-y-Corwgl, near the village of Rhoscolyn, on the west coast of Holy Island, in the north-west corner of Anglesey, Wales.

A lifeboat was first stationed at Rhoscolyn by the Anglesey Association for the Preservation of Life from Shipwreck in 1830, before being transferred to the management of the Royal National Lifeboat Institution (RNLI) in 1855.

After 99 years service, the Rhoscolyn Lifeboat Station was closed in 1929.

== History ==
In 1828, the Anglesey Association for the Preservation of Life from Shipwreck (AAPLS) was founded by the Rev. James Williams and Mrs Frances Williams, of Llanfair-yng-Nghornwy, Anglesey. On 26 March 1823, they had witnessed the loss of 140 lives from the wreck of the vessel Alert, and spent the following five years raising funds and gaining support for a lifeboat service.

The Association opened Rhoscolyn Lifeboat station in 1830. A stone boathouse measuring 30-foot x 10-foot was constructed, and a 26-foot lifeboat, designed by Palmer, costing £60, was built by McVeagh of Holyhead.

On December 31st, 1845, the vessel Alhambra was heading for the rocks in a gale. Whilst the lifeboat was being launched, Owen Jones swam across to the small island Ynys Traws, and waved a flag to warn the vessel of its impending fate. The Master immediately dropped anchor, saving the vessel from the rocks, and 23 crew were rescued by the lifeboat. Owen Jones was awarded the RNLI Silver Medal.

A replacement lifeboat was placed at Rhoscolyn in 1853, another 26-foot 3in Palmer-type lifeboat, previously built for Cemlyn. On 15 March 1855, she would be called to the vessel Southern Cross, wrecked on Maen y Sais rocks, and rescue 17 of the 18 crew.

In 1854, the Royal National Institution for the Preservation of Life from Shipwreck (RNIPLS) changed its name to become the Royal National Lifeboat Institution, and in 1855, all six lifeboat stations of the AAPLS, Cemlyn (no.1), Holyhead (no.2), Rhoscolyn (no.3), Penmon (no.4), Llanddwyn (no.5) and Moelfre (no.6), were transferred over to the management of the RNLI.

With the existing boat worn out, the RNLI provided a replacement boat in 1859, a 30-foot self-righting 'Pulling and Sailing (P&S) lifeboat, one with sails and (6) oars, costing £154, built by Forrestt of Limehouse, London, along with a new boathouse, constructed on the site of the original one.

At a meeting of the RNLI committee of management on Thursday 6 February 1868, a letter of 28 January from Mrs Boys of Brighton was read, advising of a further contribution of £150 from the estate of her late husband, Thomas Boys, who had taken a great interest in the Institution. She had hoped that a lifeboat might bear his name, and it was decided that the funds be appropriated to the station at Rhoscolyn, with their lifeboat to be named Thomas Boys of Brighton.

In 1877, the RNLI decided on a complete upgrade of the station. A new boathouse, costing £400, was designed by the Institutions honorary architect, Mr C. H. Cooke, FRIBA, and constructed at the head of the Porth-y-Corwgl cove. A new 33-foot self-righting boat, constructed of mahogony, was built by Woolfe and Son of Shadwell. London, and cost £328-18s-0d. The whole station was funded by a gift of £2000 from Marianne Catherine Cabrera, Countess de Morella, in memory of her late husband Ramón Cabrera y Griñó, 1st Duke of Maestrazgo, 1st Marquis of Ter, 1st Count of Morella, the lifeboat being named Ramon Cabrera (ON 263).

Nine years would pass before a launch resulted in a rescue. Called to the vessel Hjemlos of Grimstad, Norway on 18 December 1887, the whole crew of eight were rescued. Coxswain Hugh Hughes would receive a Silver Medal from the Norwegian Government.

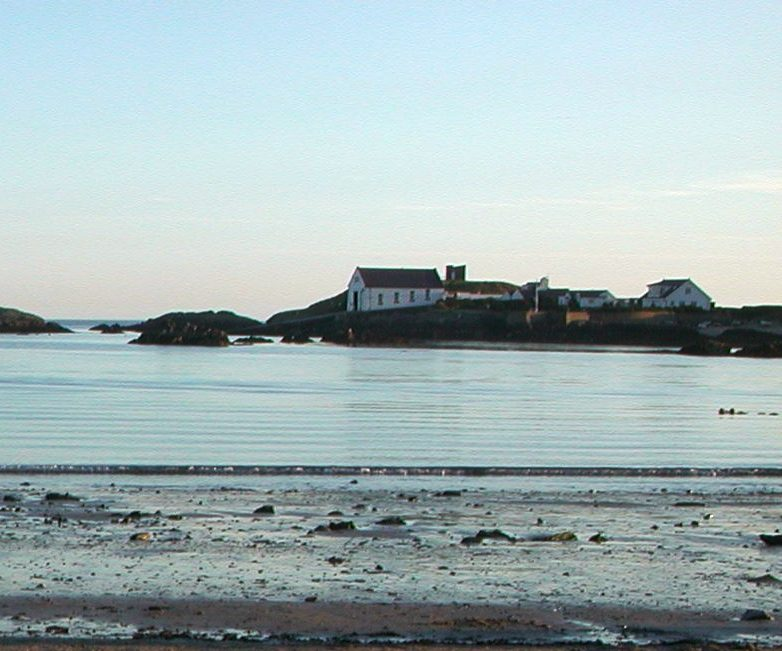
1903 Rhoscolyn Boathouse and slipway

A replacement for the Ramon Cabrera (ON 263) was provided in 1899, a 37-foot long lifeboat, built by Chambers and Colby of Lowestoft, and costing £619. This boat would also be named Ramon Cabrera (ON 423).

On 8 December 1901, the Ramon Cabrera was launched in gale-force conditions at 16:00, to the aid of the schooner J. W. Waring, located 6 miles (9.7 km) south of Rhoscolyn Point. After three failed attempts to get a line to the vessel, the lifeboat was forced on its beam-ends, filling with water, but self-righting. Finally, all five crew men were taken aboard the lifeboat, shortly before the vessel drove onto Porth Saint Rocks and broke up. For this, and previous service in the lifeboat, Coxswain Hugh Hughes was awarded the RNLI Silver Medal.

In 1903, a fourth boathouse would be constructed, at a cost of £1,591-10s-0d. This time it was next to the shore, with a roller-slipway for quick launching.

Ramon Cabrera (ON 423) was launched to the Timbo of Whitby, in distress in a storm on 3 December 1920, whilst on passage to Newport from Liverpool. The lifeboat crew rowed for two hours to the wreck. Failing to establish a line to the vessel, but which for now seemed firmly anchored, the lifeboat headed for Llanddwyn, the seas too rough to return to Rhoscolyn. Hit by a large wave, Evan Hughes and Owen Jones were washed overboard, and couldn't be retrieved. Then, when the lifeboat was two miles off shore, it capsized. Although the boat self-righted, and eight crew managed to get back on board, Coxswain Owen Owens, and crew members Richard Hughes (brother of Evan) and William Thomas, were also lost. The lifeboat arrived at Llanddwyn eight hours after setting out. The Timbo was later driven ashore, with all but four crew making it safely ashore.

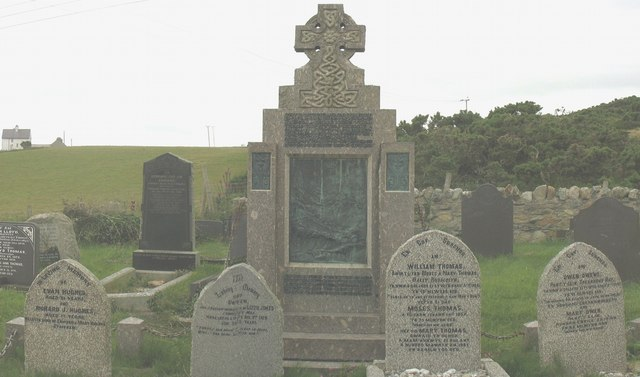
1922 Memorial at St Gwenfaen's Church, Rhoscolyn

A memorial was erected at St Gwenfaen's Church, Rhoscolyn, on 12 November 1922, unveiled by Sir Richard Williams-Bulkeley, 12th Baronet, whose family had provided the land for the Penmon lifeboat station.

It was decided to close the Rhoscolyn Lifeboat Station in 1929. No accurate service records are available prior to 1859, but it is known that at least 49 lives were saved. In the following 70 years, the Rhoscolyn boat was launched 56 times, and rescued 41 lives.

The 1877 boathouse is now a private residence. The 1903 boathouse is grade II listed, and is currently a holiday let. The lifeboat on station at the time of closure, Ramon Cabrera (ON 423), was retired, and sold from service.

== Station honours ==
The following are awards made at Rhoscolyn

- RNLI Silver Medal

Owen Jones, Landsman – 1846

Hugh Hughes, Coxswain – 1902

- Silver Medal, awarded by the Norwegian Government

Hugh Hughes, Coxswain – 1887

== Roll of honour ==
In memory of those lost whilst serving Rhoscolyn lifeboat.

- Lost when the lifeboat capsized whilst on service to the steamer Timbo of Whitby, 3 December 1920.

Owen Owens, Coxswain (61)
Evan Hughes (34)
Richard J. Hughes (17)
Owen Jones (38)
William Thomas (19)

== Rhoscolyn lifeboats ==
ON (Note: ON is the RNLI's Official Number of the boat.)	Name	Built	On station	Class	Comments
Pre-145	Unnamed	1829	1830–1853	26-foot 3in Palmer	(Note: 26-foot 3in x 6-foot (5/6-oared) Palmer-class non-self-righting lifeboat, provided by the AAPLS, built by McVeagh of Holyhead, costing £60.)
Pre-131	Unnamed	1828	1853–1859	26-foot 3in Palmer	(Note: 26-foot 3in x 6-foot (5/6-oared) Palmer-class non-self-righting lifeboat, provided by the AAPLS, built by Taylor of Blackwall, London, costing £55 when new.); Previously at Cemlyn.
Pre-347	Unnamed	1859	1859–1868	30-foot Peake Self-righting (P&S)	(Note: 30-foot x 6-foot 6in (6-oared) Peake-class self-righting (P&S) lifeboat, from RNLI funds, built by Forrestt of Limehouse, London, costing £149.); Renamed Thomas Boys of Brighton in 1868.
Pre-347	Thomas Boys of Brighton	1859	1868–1872	30-foot Peake Self-righting (P&S)	(Note: Legacy of Mr T. Boys of Hove.)
Pre-389	Thomas Boys of Brighton	1862	1872–1878	33-foot Peake Self-righting (P&S)	(Note: 33-foot x 8-foot (10-oared) Peake-class self-righting (P&S) lifeboat, legacy of Mr T. Boys of Hove, Forrestt of Limehouse, London, costing £231 when new.); Previously Ipswich at Thorpeness.
263	Ramon Cabrera	1877	1878–1899	33-foot Peake Self-righting (P&S)	(Note: 33-foot x 8-foot (10-oared) Peake-class self-righting (P&S) lifeboat, gift of Countess de Morella of Ascot, built of mahogany by Woolfe of Shadwell, London, costing £329.)
423	Ramon Cabrera	1899	1899–1929	37-foot Self-righting (P&S)	(Note: 37-foot x 9-foot 3in (10-oared) self-righting (P&S) lifeboat, gift of Countess de Morella of Ascot, build by Chambers and Colby of Lowestoft, costing £619.)

Pre ON numbers are unofficial numbers used by the Lifeboat Enthusiast Society to reference early lifeboats not included on the official RNLI list.

== See also ==
- List of RNLI stations
- List of former RNLI stations
- Royal National Lifeboat Institution lifeboats
