= Holyhead Lifeboat Station =

RNLI Lifeboat Station in Anglesey, Wales

- Gorsaf Bad Achub Caergybi

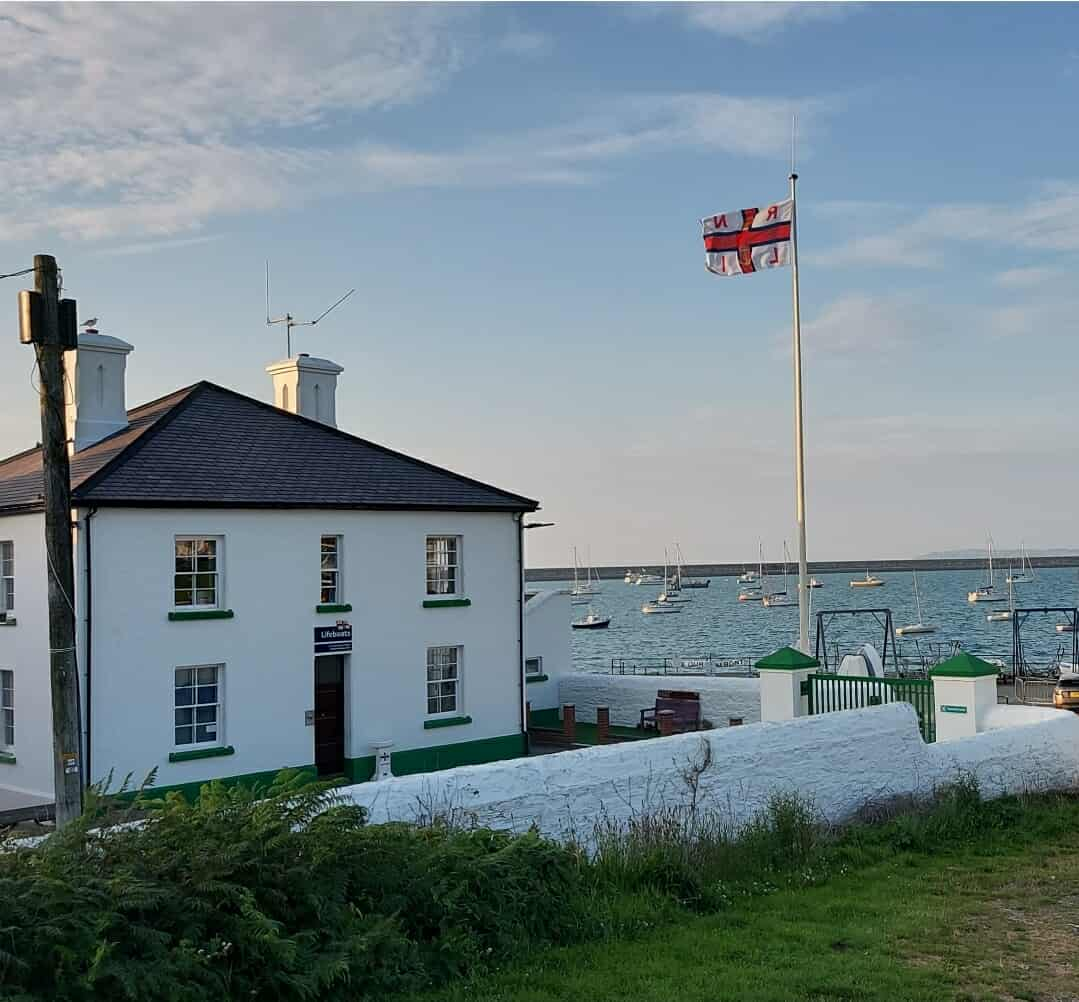
- Holyhead Lifeboat Station

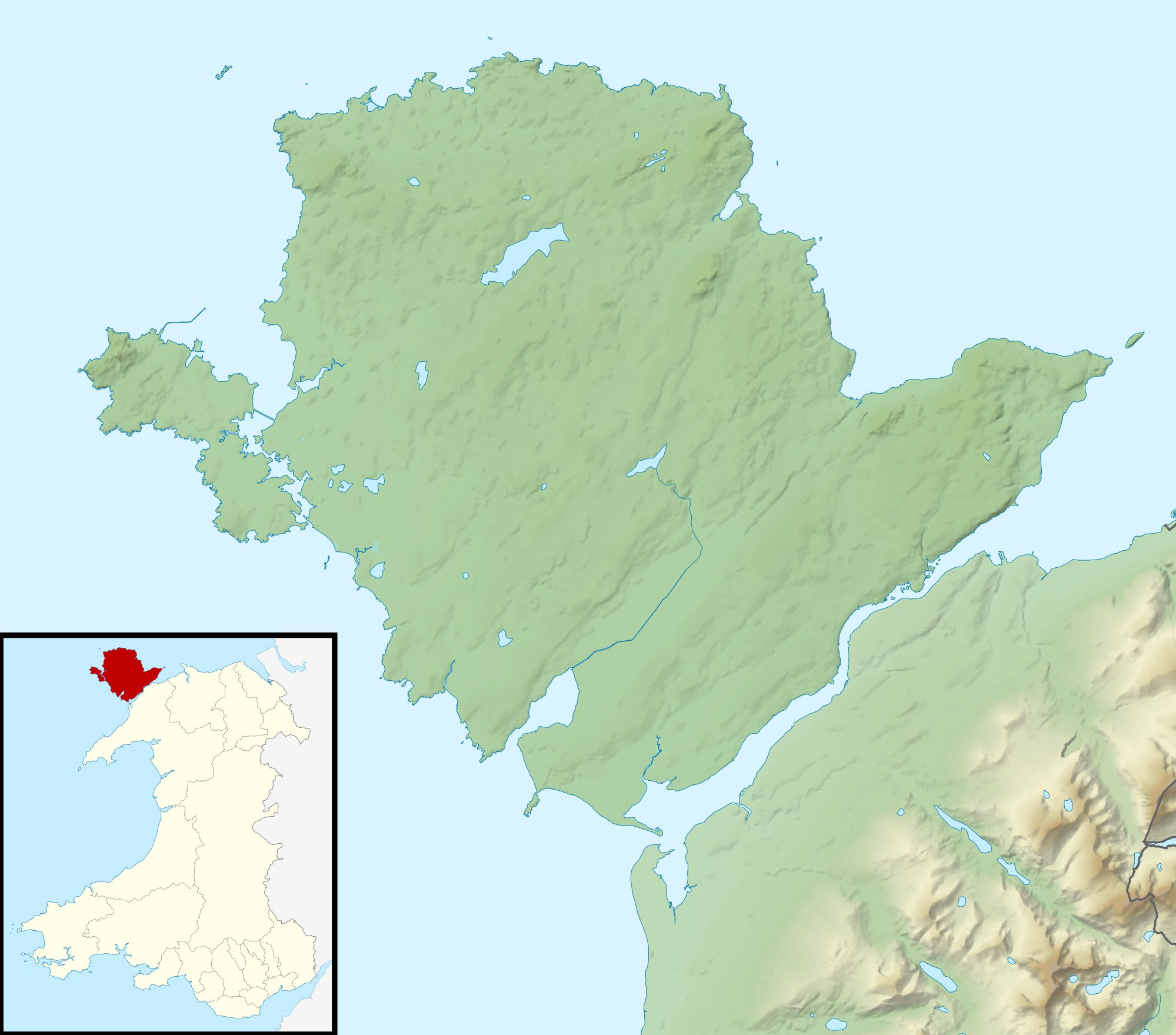
- Location within Anglesey

General information
- Type: RNLI Lifeboat Station
- Location: Prince of Wales Road, Newry Beach, Holyhead, Anglesey, Wales, LL65 1YA,, United Kingdom
- Coordinates: 53.318°N 4.642°W
- Opened: AAPLS 1828–1855; RNLI 1855–present
- Owner: Royal National Lifeboat Institution

Website
- Holyhead RNLI Lifeboat Station

Holyhead Lifeboat Station (Welsh: Gorsaf Bad Achub Caergybi) is located at Newry Beach, off Beach Road, Holyhead, a port town which sits on Holy Island, a smaller island to the north-west of the main Isle of Anglesey, separated by the Cymyran Strait, in North Wales. It is one of the three oldest lifeboat stations situated on the North Wales coast. A former boathouse now houses the Holyhead Maritime Museum.

A lifeboat was first placed at Holyhead in 1829 by the Anglesey Association for the Preservation of Life from Shipwreck (AAPLS). Management of the lifeboats of the AAPLS was transferred to the Royal National Lifeboat Institution (RNLI) in 1855.

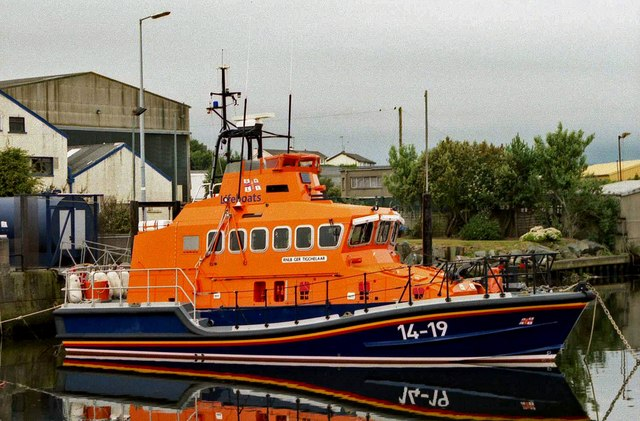
Trent-class lifeboat 14-19 Ger Tigchelaar (ON 1223)

The station currently operates 14-19 Ger Tigchelaar (ON 1205), a Trent-class All-weather lifeboat, on station since 2026, and the smaller D-class (IB1) Inshore lifeboat, Mary & Archie Hooper (D-791), on station since 2016.

== History ==
In 1808, on behalf of a local committee, William Vickers made an application to Lloyd's of London for assistance funding a lifeboat. At a meeting on 13 January, the request was reviewed and agreed, and a grant of £50 was offered. However, there is no further evidence of any lifeboat, and it is assumed the boat never materialised.

A request was then made to the Royal National Institution for the Preservation of Life from Shipwreck (RNIPLS) in 1825, but again there seems to be no further evidence of a lifeboat.

In 1828, the Anglesey Association for the Preservation of Life from Shipwreck (AAPLS) was founded, by the Rev. James Williams and Mrs Frances Williams, of Llanfair-yng-Nghornwy, Anglesey. On 26 March 1823, they had witnessed the loss of 140 lives from the wreck of the vessel Alert, and spent the following five years raising funds and gaining support for a lifeboat service.

A 31-foot 6in (8-oared) Palmer-class lifeboat was constructed by McVeagh of Holyhead, at a cost of £80, and placed at Holyhead in 1829 by the AAPLS.

Over the following years, the station would become one of six operated by the AAPLS. In 1854, the RNIPLS changed its name to become the Royal National Lifeboat Institution, and in 1855, all six lifeboat stations of the AAPLS, Cemlyn (no.1), Holyhead (no.2), Rhoscolyn (no.3), Penmon (no.4), Llanddwyn (no.5) and Moelfre (no.6), were transferred over to the management of the RNLI.

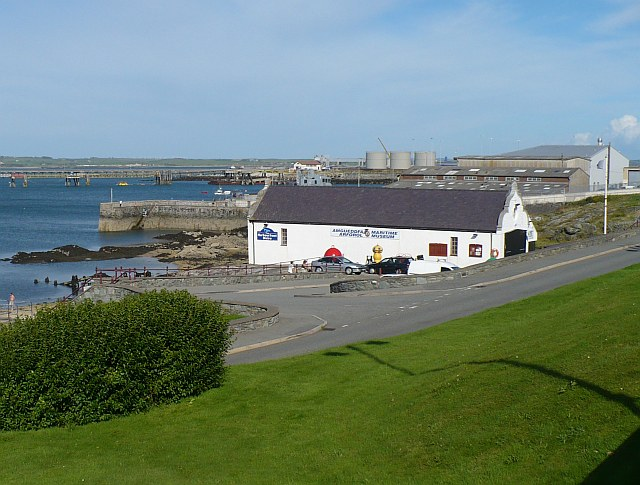
1858 Holyhead Lifeboat House, now Maritime Museum

Often the RNLI would immediately replace the lifeboat, on assuming management of a station, but in this case, the 1829 lifeboat must have been in reasonable condition, as it wasn't until 1858 that it was replaced. It was by then showing signs of decay, and a 30 ft (9.1 m) Peake-class self-righting 'Pulling and Sailing' (P&S) lifeboat, one with sails and (10) oars, was constructed by Forrestt of Limehouse, at a cost of £161. A substantial boathouse was constructed by the Lords of the Admiralty, at the expense of The Crown.

At a meeting of the RNLI committee of management on Thursday 5 August 1875, the receipt of £2,500 was recorded, gifted from Samuel, John and Joshua Fielden, for the construction and maintenance of a lifeboat, to be named Thomas Fielden (ON 192) in memory of their late uncle. The three men were the sons of John Fielden of Todmorden, a British industrialist and Radical Member of Parliament for Oldham (1832–1847). On the death of John's brother Thomas, the three nephews inherited an estate of £1.3million.

It was decided to appropriate the funds for the purchase of a 37-foot self-righting lifeboat for Holyhead, where a new boathouse was also constructed.

A further gift of £2000 in 1891 funded the replacement 39-foot self-righting lifeboat, again named Thomas Fielden (ON 300).

In 1892, Holyhead Lifeboat Station received its first Steam lifeboat, which was one of six to serve in the RNLI. The lifeboat was involved in an operation to rescue crew members of the SS Harold in 1908, which anchored near rocks between North Stack and South Stack. The third steam Lifeboat to serve at Holyhead, James Stevens No.3, was retired in 1928 when it was replaced by a motor-powered Watson-class lifeboat, H.C.J. (ON 708).

Twenty-one years later, a new boathouse and slipway were constructed on Salt Island.

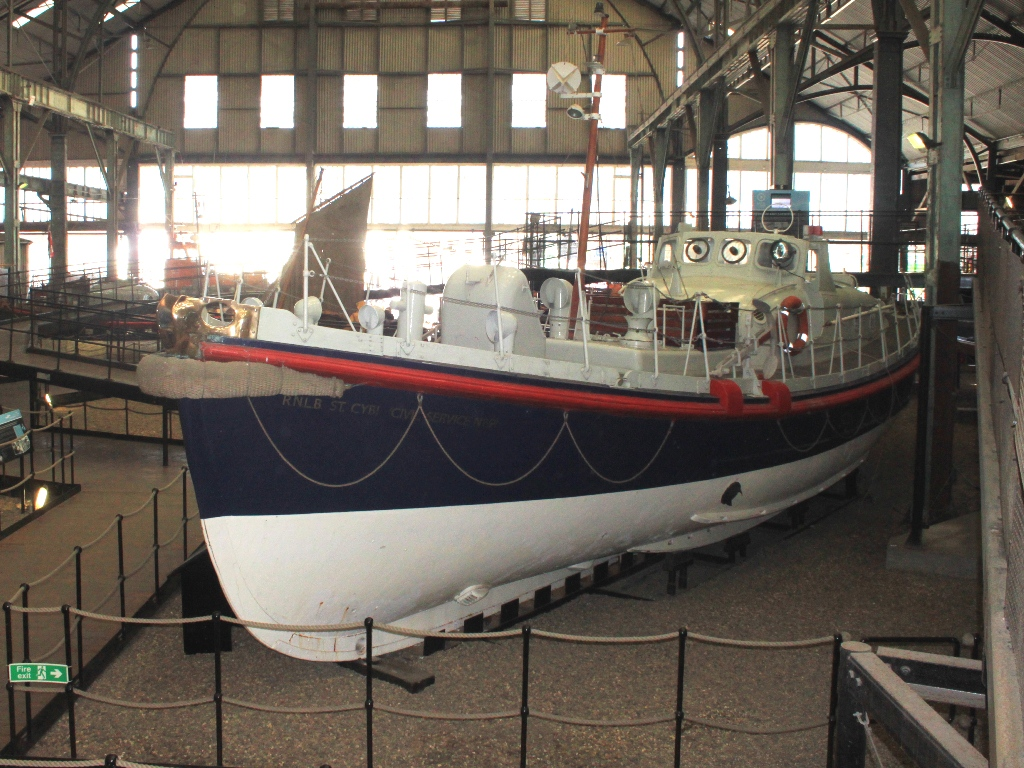
Holyhead Lifeboat 1950–1980 Barnett-class (ON 884) St Cybi (Civil Service No. 9) at Chatham Historic Dockyard

The boathouse and slipway were used until 1980, when a new Arun-class boat was allocated to the station and kept afloat in the harbour. Unfortunately, wash from the ferry traffic led to the boat's GRP hull being damaged, and as a temporary measure, a steel-hulled Waveney-class boat was placed on station, while the boathouse and slipway were reconditioned and a new Tyne-class boat was constructed for the station. The new boat entered service in 1985, and slipway launching continued until 1997 when a new, more protected, berth was found for another Arun-class boat, 52-37 Kenneth Thelwall (ON 1123) to take over.

In 2003, the Arun-class was replaced by the Severn-class Lifeboat, 17–41 Christopher Pearce (ON 1272).

An Inshore lifeboat station was established on the site in 1967. The boathouse was expanded in 1987 to fit a D-class (EA16) and its launching trolley. The current inshore boat, Mary & Archie Hooper (D-791), entered service in 2016. Lead was stolen from the station's roof in the morning of 16 June 2011. In February 2015 the station appointed its first female helm.

The Christopher Pearce was reallocated to the RNLI relief fleet in 2025, with Holyhead receiving the Trent-class lifeboat 14-07 Frederick Storey Cockburn (ON 1205) from the relief fleet. In February 2026, 14-07 was replaced by 14-19 Ger Tigchelaar (ON 1223), previously at Arklow.

== Station honours ==
The following are awards made at Holyhead:

- RNIPLS Gold Medal
  Capt. William Owen, of the brig Stanley – 1835
- RNLI Gold Medal
  William Owen, Coxswain Superintendent – 1908
  Lt. Cmdr. Harold Harknett Harvey VRD, RNR, Inspector of Lifeboats (North West) – 1967
- RNIPLS Silver Medal
  Thomas Hughes, Boatman 1st Class – 1829
  Robert Stables, Coxswain – 1833
  Capt. William Owen, Master Mariner – 1833
  Oliver Anthony, Master Mariner – 1833
  Richard Morris, Lifeboat Keeper – 1835
  Henry Parry, Quartermaster, H.M. Packet Doberell – 1840
- RNLI Silver Medal
  William Rowlands, Coxswain – 1866
  William Rowlands, Coxswain – 1867 (Second-Service clasp)
  Thomas Roberts, Coxswain – 1883 (This service was carried out in the Rhosneigr lifeboat).
  Thomas Roberts, Coxswain – 1886 (Second-Service clasp)
  Edward Jones, Coxswain – 1887
  John O. Williams, Chief Officer, H.M. Coastguard, Holyhead, Hon. Secretary – 1888
  Edward Jones, Coxswain – 1889 (Second-Service clasp)
  Robert Jones, Second Coxswain – 1889
  Thomas W. Brooke, crewman – 1908
  George Jones, crewman – 1908
  Lewis Jones, crewman – 1908
  Richard Jones, crewman – 1908
  Samuel Jones, crewman – 1908
  James Lee, crewman – 1908
  William McLaughlin, crewman – 1908
  Charles H. Marshall, crewman – 1908
  William Owen Jnr., crewman – 1908
  Lewis Roberts, crewman – 1908
  Thomas Alcock, Coxswain – 1967
  Eric Samuel Jones, Motor Mechanic – 1967
  William Jones, Coxswain – 1977
- RNLI Bronze Medal
  Richard Jones, Coxswain – 1943
  John Jones, Motor Mechanic – 1943
  Richard Jones, Coxswain – 1949 (Second-Service clasp)
  William John Jones, Second Coxswain – 1967
  Francis Ward, Acting Bowman – 1967
  Jack Sharpe, Acting Assistant Mechanic – 1967
  David Graham Drinkwater, crew member – 1967
  John Michael Hughes, crew member – 1967
  Brian Gordon Stewart, crew member – 1967
  Donald Malcolm Forrest, Mechanic – 1971
  Gareth Ogwen Jones, crew member – 1971
  John Michael Hughes, crew member – 1971 (Second-Service clasp)
  William John Jones, Coxswain – 1977 (Second-Service clasp)
- The Thanks of the Institution on Vellum
  Awarded to each of the 15 crew – 1883 (This service was carried out in the Rhosneigr lifeboat).
  Holyhead lifeboat crew – 1978
- The Sugar Manufacturer’s Association (of Jamaica) Ltd Case of Rum 1954
  for the longest continuous service during the winter months of 1953/54
  Holyhead lifeboat crew – 1954
- Member, Order of the British Empire (MBE)
  Thomas Brian Thomson, Coxswain – 2007QBH

== Roll of honour ==
In memory of those lost whilst serving Holyhead lifeboat:

- Lost when the lifeboat capsized on service to the schooner Henry Holman of Plymouth, 14 January 1865.
  William Hughes
- Died as a result of exposure and injuries, after falling on rocks on service to the steamship Meath, 1 February 1892.
  Robert Jones, Coxswain
- Killed in a boiler room explosion aboard Steam-class lifeboat Duke of Northumberland, 26 June 1901
  John Owen (47)
  Thomas Owen
- Killed when the vessel The Gardner Williams rolled on top of the lifeboat, 28 March 1920
  Thomas J. Michael (36)

== Holyhead lifeboats ==
=== Holyhead / Holyhead No.1 ===
ON (Note: ON is the RNLI's Official Number of the boat.)	Name	Built	On station	Class	Comments
Pre-144	Unnamed	1829	1829–1858	31-foot 6in Palmer	(Note: 31 ft 6 in (9.60 m) x 6 ft 9 in (2.06 m) (8-oared) Palmer-class lifeboat, funded by the Anglesey Lifeboat Association, built by McVeagh of Holyhead, costing £80.); Condemned in 1858.
Pre-313	Unnamed	1857	1858–1864	30-foot Peake self-righting (P&S)	(Note: 30 ft 0 in (9.14 m) x 7 ft 6 in (2.29 m) (10-oared) Peake-class self-righting (P&S) lifeboat, funded by the RNLI, built by Forrestt of Limehouse, London, costing £161.); Lengthened in 1864, and transferred to New Quay.
Pre-310	Princess of Wales	1857	1864–1875	36-foot Peake self-righting (P&S)	(Note: 36 ft 0 in (10.97 m) x 8 ft 4 in (2.54 m) (12-oared) Peake-class self-righting (P&S) lifeboat, gift of Mr Jos. Leather of Liverpool, built and modified by Forrestt of Limehouse, London, costing £158 when new.); Previously unnamed at Arklow. Capsized 14 January 1865. Sold in 1875.
192	Thomas Fielden	1875	1875–1891	37-foot self-righting (P&S)	(Note: 37 ft 0 in (11.28 m) x 9 ft 1 in (2.77 m) (12-oared) self-righting (P&S) lifeboat, gift of Samuel, John and Joshua Fielden of Todmorden, built by Woolfe of Shadwell, London, costing £444.); Sold in 1891.
300	Thomas Fielden	1891	1891–1897	39-foot self-righting (P&S)	(Note: 39 ft 0 in (11.89 m) x 9 ft 0 in (2.74 m) (12-oared) self-righting (P&S) lifeboat, gift of Samuel, John and Joshua Fielden of Todmorden, built by McAlister of Dumbarton, costing £448.); Transferred to Barrow.
231	Duke of Northumberland	1889	1897–1922	Steam	Previously at New Brighton.
420	James Stevens No.3	1898	1922–1928	Steam	First in service at Grimsby

Pre ON numbers are unofficial numbers used by the Lifeboat Enthusiasts' Society to reference early lifeboats not included on the official RNLI list.

=== Holyhead No.2 ===
ON	Name	Built	On station	Class	Comments
264	Joseph Whitworth	1889	1890–1915	37-foot self-righting (P&S)	(Note: 37 ft 0 in (11.28 m) x 9 ft 0 in (2.74 m) (12-oared) self-righting (P&S) lifeboat, legacy of Sir Joseph Whitworth, gift of Lady Whitworth, built by James Beeching of Great Yarmouth, costing £450.); Sold in 1915.
617	Fanny Harriet	1911	1915–1929	37-foot self-righting (P&S)	(Note: 37 ft 0 in (11.28 m) x 9 ft 3 in (2.82 m) (12-oared) self-righting (P&S) lifeboat, legacy of Miss F. H. Roe of Bath, built by Thames Ironworks of Blackwall, London, costing £1,107 when new.); Previously at Dunmore East. Later stored for eight years. Sold in 1937.
485	Robert and Catherine	1902	1929–1930	34-foot Dungeness self-righting (P&S)	(Note: 34 ft 0 in (10.36 m) x 8 ft 0 in (2.44 m) (10-oared) Dungeness-class (Rubie) self-righting (P&S) lifeboat, legacy of Miss F. H. Roe of Bath, built by Thames Ironworks of Blackwall, London, costing £1,107.); Previously at Appledore. Later used for demonstration purposes. Sold in 1934. Renamed Misty Dawn, later Girl Anne. Broken up at Montrose basin, October 2002.

=== Holyhead No.3 ===
ON	Name	Built	On station	Class	Comments
231	Duke of Northumberland	1889	1892–1893	Steam	Previously at Harwich. Transferred to New Brighton

=== Holyhead ===
ON	Op.No. (Note: Op. No. is the RNLI's Operational Number of the boat carried on the hull.)	Name	Built	On station	Class	Comments
708	–	H.C.J.	1928	1928–1929	45-foot 6in Watson	Transferred to Thurso
717	–	A.E.D.	1929	1929–1950	51-foot Barnett	Transferred to Valentia
884	–	St.Cybi (Civil Service No.9)	1950	1950–1980	52-foot Barnett (Mk.I)	
1067	52-15	Hyman Winstone	1980	1980–1984	Arun	Transferred to the relief fleet, later at Ballycotton
1003	44-004	Faithful Forester	1967	1984–1985	Waveney	Previously at Dover
1095	47-004	St.Cybi II (Civil Service No.40)	1985	1985–1997	Tyne	
1123	52-37	Kenneth Thelwall	1987	1998–2003	Arun	Previously at Humber
1272	17-41	Christopher Pearce	2003	2003–2025	Severn	
1205	14-07	Frederick Storey Cockburn	1995	2025–2026	Trent	Previously at Courtmacsherry Harbour
1223	14-19	Ger Tigchelaar	1995	2026–	Trent	Previously at Arklow

More post-service details can be found on the respective lifeboat class pages.

=== Inshore lifeboats ===
==== D class ====
Op.No.	Name	On station	Class	Comments
D-116	Unnamed	1967–1976	D-class (RFD PB16)	
D-249	Caribbean I	1976–1988	D-class (Zodiac III)	
D-358	Unnamed	1988–1996	D-class (EA16)	
D-507	Spirit of Bedworth and Nuneaton	1996–2005	D-class (EA16)	
D-654	Angel of Holyhead (Civil Service No.46)	2005–2016	D-class (IB1)	
D-791	Mary & Archie Hooper	2016–	D-class (IB1)	

== See also ==
- List of RNLI stations
- List of former RNLI stations
- Royal National Lifeboat Institution lifeboats
