= Moelfre Lifeboat Station =

RNLI lifeboat station in Anglesey, Wales

- Gorsaf Bad Achub Moelfre

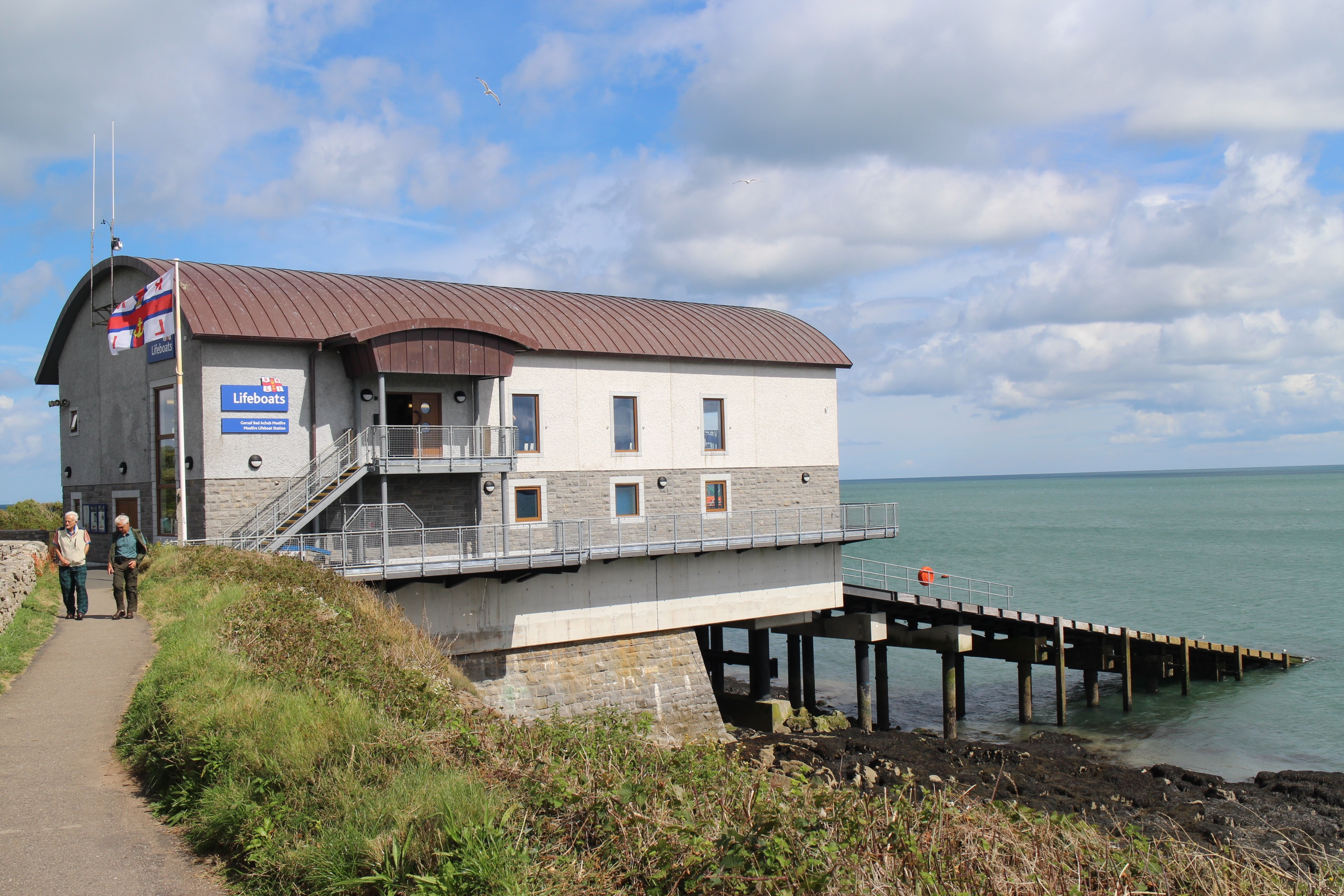
- Moelfre Lifeboat Station

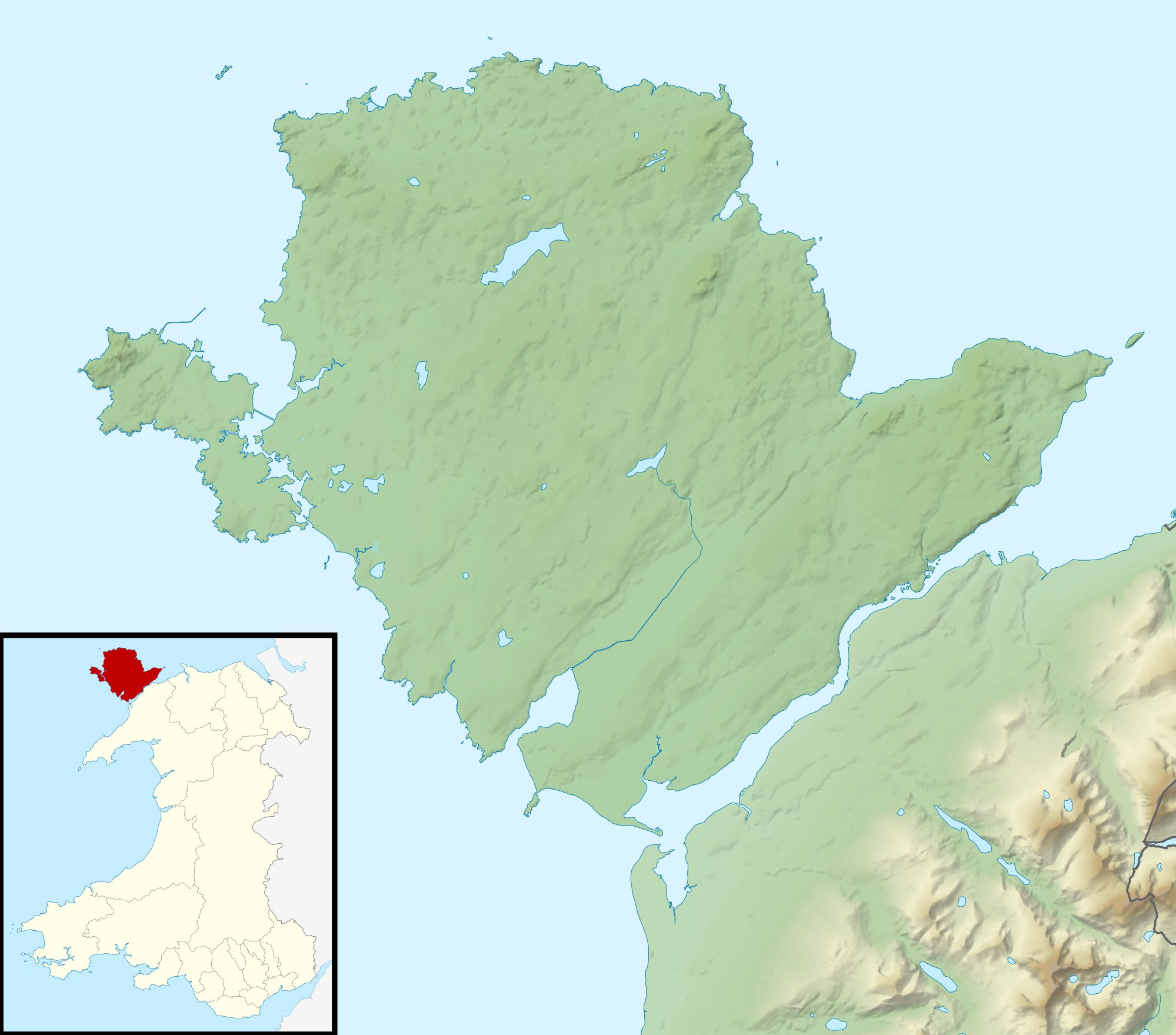
- Location within Anglesey

General information
- Type: RNLI Lifeboat Station
- Location: Moelfre Lifeboat Station, Lifeboat Lane, Moelfre, Anglesey, Wales, LL72 8LG, UK
- Coordinates: 53°21′17.0″N 4°13′55.3″W
- Opened: AAPLS 1848–1855; RNLI 1855–present
- Owner: Royal National Lifeboat Institution

Website
- Moelfre RNLI Lifeboat Station

Moelfre Lifeboat Station (Welsh: Gorsaf Bad Achub Moelfre) can be found on Lifeboat Lane in Moelfre, a village overlooking Moelfre Bay, on the north-east coast Anglesey, North Wales.

A lifeboat was first stationed at Moelfre in 1848 by the Anglesey Association for the Preservation of Life from Shipwreck (AAPLS). Management of the station was transferred to the Royal National Lifeboat Institution (RNLI) in 1855.

There are 2 lifeboats, the slipway launched All-weather Tamar-class lifeboat 16-25 Kiwi (ON 1305), on station since 2013, named in appreciation of the major sponsor of the boat, a native of New Zealand, which normally carries a crew of six or seven. The Inshore lifeboat is a D-class (IB1) named Enfys 2 (D-825), with three crew, on station since 2018.

== History ==
The Anglesey Association for the Preservation of Life from Shipwreck was founded by the Rev. James and Mrs Frances Williams in 1828. They had witnessed the loss of 140 lives from the wreck of the vessel Alert in 1823, and spent the following five years raising funds and gaining support.

By 1846, the Anglesey Association had already started stations at Cemlyn, Holyhead, Rhoscolyn, Penmon, and Llanddwyn (Niwbwrch), and it was decided that the next station (Station No.6) would be at Moelfre. In 1848, Penmon got a new boat, and their old lifeboat was transferred to Moelfre, where a new stone-built boathouse had been constructed. Roland Hughes was appointed Coxswain in 1849.

In 1855, the Anglesey Association's six lifeboat stations were formally handed over to the RNLI. A new boat had been constructed for Moelfre in 1854, and she would remain on service for the next 20 years. In 1866 and 1867, the "London Sunday-School Lifeboat-Fund" raised over £700. In recognition of this, and the Hon. Secretary of the fund, the Moelfre lifeboat was renamed London Sunday Schools and Charles Seare in 1867.

A new boathouse, costing £158-18s-0d, and later a slipway, was constructed at Porth Nigwyl in 1875. This boathouse can still be seen today.

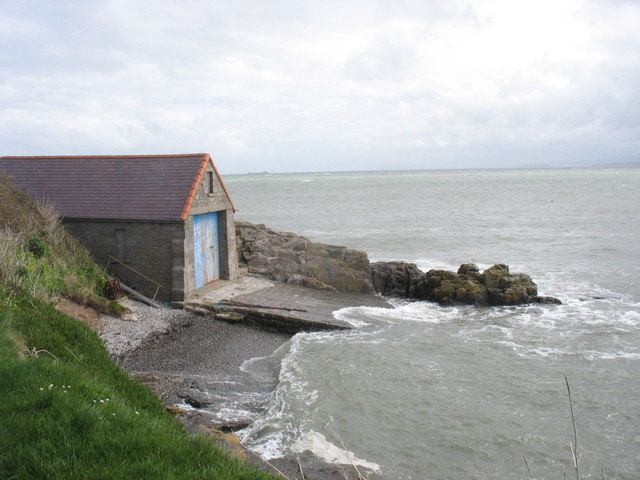
The old lifeboat station at Porth Nigwyl

However, a bigger lifeboat house with deep-water slipway was constructed in 1909 to house Charles and Eliza Laura (ON 605) and is still the site of the current lifeboat house. This was modified several times between 1930 and 1993 to accommodate larger boats; its slipway had been commensurately lengthened as well. This station was stone-built with rendered walls and a slate roof, on a rectangular base of coursed, squared limestone.

A new boathouse to house the Tamar-class lifeboat was required, built on the site of the 1909 boathouse, and became operational in March 2015. The new station building can house both the All-weather and Inshore lifeboats, and has up to date crew facilities with kit drying room and a hot shower, and new mechanics workshop. With the office, training room, meeting area and visitor facilities all based at the RNLI Seawatch Centre 150 yards (140 m) away, the size of the new lifeboat station was reduced, significantly reducing building costs.

== Notable rescues ==
At 15:30 on the 28 October 1927, at the height of a storm with gale force winds gusting up to 85 mph, Second Coxswain William Roberts launched the Charles and Eliza Laura (ON 605) to the aid of the vessel Excel of Poole. Also onboard was Capt. Owen Jones, an experience seaman, but not part of the regular crew due to his work, After battling the conditions for over 2 hours, they finally reached the Excel. Realising it was about to sink, they sailed the lifeboat onto the deck of the vessel, rescuing the three crew, before a wave washed the lifeboat off, and the vessel sinking minutes later. The lifeboat, badly damaged, and unable to return to Moelfre due to the weather, made for Puffin Island. Sadly, two lives were lost, one of the vessel crew had been badly injured during the rescue and died, whilst lifeboat crewman William Roberts collapsed and died of exhaustion.

At 22:00, the Beaumaris motor lifeboat was sent out to find the Moelfre boat. Finding the lifeboat in the shelter of Puffin Island, and assuming they were just waiting for a break in the weather, the Beaumaris lifeboat returned to station. The Moelfre crew remained with their battered lifeboat for the rest of the night, and it was only at dawn that the Beaumaris lifeboat was again despatched, this time towing the Moelfre boat, landing the exhausted crew back at Beaumaris Pier at 08:30. For their outstanding service, Acting Coxswain William Roberts, and Capt. Owen Jones were each awarded the RNLI Gold Medal. Each of the remaining crew were awarded the RNLI Bronze Medal, including a rare posthumous Bronze Medal for William Roberts.

Postscript: Three years later in 1930, Moelfre received their first motor-powered lifeboat, a 40-foot 6in Watson-class lifeboat, with a single 50-hp petrol engine, giving just over 7 knots. She cost £5,886, and was named G. W. (ON 724), following two separate bequests, in memory of George Staley and Wade Richards, the funds combined to cover the cost. On 27 July 1932, G. W. was launched to find a missing fishing boat, but neither the person or boat was ever found. The missing person was Capt. Owen Jones, recipient of the RNLI Gold Medal.

== Memorial Statue ==
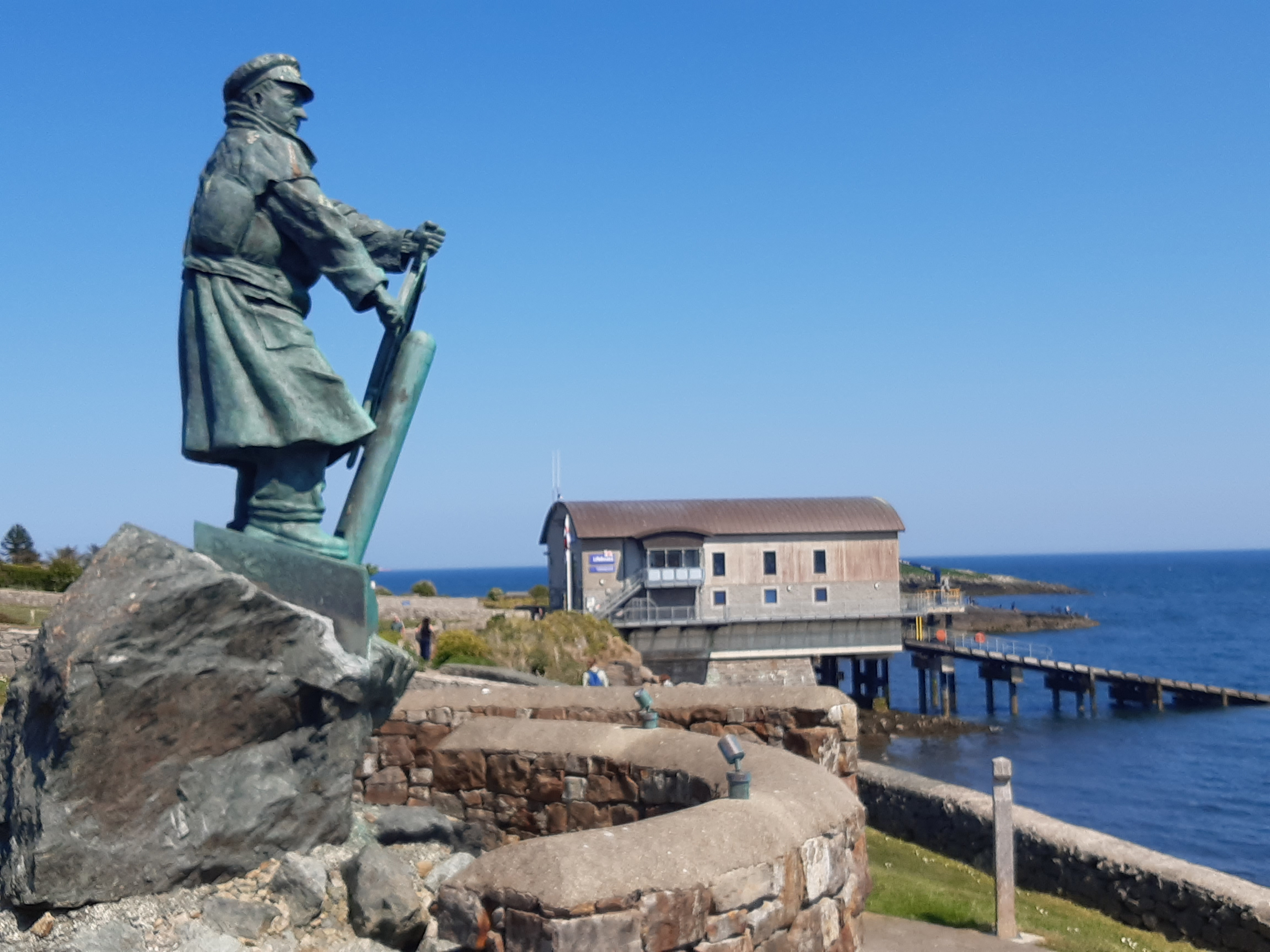
Memorial to Richard (Dic) Evans

Richard Matthew (Dic) Evans BEM (1905–2001) served as a crewmen and Coxswain at the station for 50 years, and was credited with saving 281 lives. He was twice awarded the RNLI Gold Medal.

On 23 November 2004, a bronze statue in his memory, situated adjacent to the Moelfre lifeboat station, was unveiled by Prince Charles, the Prince of Wales.

The statue stands 7 ft (2.1 m) high on a granite plinth and was created by Sam Holland.

== Station honours ==
The following are awards made at Moelfre:

- RNLI Gold Medal
  William Roberts, Second Coxswain – 1927
  Capt. Owen Jones, crew member – 1927
  Richard Matthew Evans, Coxswain – 1959
  Richard Matthew Evans, Coxswain – 1967 (Second-Service clasp)
- RNLI Silver Medal
  Rowland Hughes, Coxswain – 1884
  Richard Owen, Assistant Coxswain – 1901
  Thomas Owen, Coxswain – 1902
  John Matthews, Coxswain – 1940
  John Matthews, Coxswain – 1943 (Second-Service clasp)
  Evan Owens, Motor Mechanic – 1959
  Evan Owens, Motor Mechanic – 1967 (Second-Service clasp)
- RNLI Bronze Medal
  William Williams, Bowman – 1927
  Robert Richard Francis, crew member – 1927
  Owen Jones, crew member – 1927
  Thomas Jones, crew member – 1927
  Hugh Lloyd Matthews, crew member – 1927
  Hugh Owen, crew member – 1927
  John Lewis Owen, crew member – 1927
  Robert Owen, crew member – 1927
  Owen Owens, crew member – 1927
  William Roberts, crew member - 1927 (posthumous)
  Hugh Thomas, crew member – 1927
  Richard Thomas, crew member – 1927
  Thomas Williams, crew member – 1927
  John Matthews, Coxswain – 1937
  Robert Williams, Motor Mechanic – 1940
  Richard Matthew Evans, Coxswain, Second Coxswain – 1943
  Robert Williams, Motor Mechanic – 1943
  Donald Murphy Francis, crew member – 1959
  Hugh Owen, crew member – 1959 (Second-Service clasp)
  Hugh Jones, crew member – 1959
  Donald Murphy Francis, Second Coxswain – 1967 (Second-Service clasp)
  Hugh Owen, Acting Bowman – 1967 (Third-Service clasp)
  Hugh Jones, crew member – 1967 (Second-Service clasp)
  William Maynard Davies, Assistant Mechanic – 1967
  David T Evans, crew member – 1967
  Capt. Jocelyn David Jeavons, crew member – 1967
- 'The Thanks of the Institution inscribed on Vellum'
  William John Roberts, Coxswain – 1975
  William John Roberts, Coxswain – 1982
  Rodney Pace, Second Coxswain – 2002
- 'A Framed Letter of Thanks signed by the Chairman of the Institution'
  John Thomas, Second Coxswain – 1978
  Kenneth Roberts, crew member – 1978
  William John Roberts, Coxswain – 1980
  John Thomas, Second Coxswain – 1980
  Rodney Pace, Helm – 1990
  Anthony Barclay, crew member – 1990
  Rodney Pace, crew member – 1995
  David Massey, crew member – 1995
  Anthony Barclay, Coxswain – 2002
- Member, Order of the British Empire (MBE)
  William John Roberts, lately Coxswain – 1994QBH
- British Empire Medal
  Richard Matthew Evans, Coxswain – 1969QBH

== Roll of honour ==
In memory of those lost whilst serving at Moelfre:

- Collapsed and died whilst on service to the ketch Excel, 28 October 1927
  William Roberts, crew member (65) posthumously awarded the RNLI Bronze Medal

== Moelfre lifeboats ==
=== Pulling and Sailing (P&S) lifeboats ===
ON (Note: ON is the RNLI's Official Number of the boat.)	Name	Built	On station	Class	Comments
Pre-151	Unnamed	1830	1848–1853	26-foot Palmer	(Note: 26 ft 0 in (7.92 m) x 6 ft 0 in (1.83 m) (6-oared) Palmer-class non-self-righting lifeboat, funded by the Anglesey LB Association, built by Harton of Limehouse, London, costing £60 when new.); Previously at Penmon. Transferred to Cemlyn.
Pre-277	Unnamed	1854	1854–1867	28-foot non-self righting Whale Boat	(Note: 28 ft 0 in (8.53 m) x 7 ft 0 in (2.13 m) (8/12-oared) non-self-righting Whale Boat, funded by the Anglesey LB Association, built by Griffiths of Holyhead, fitted with Sperrows Air Cases, costing £110.); Renamed London Sunday Schools and Charles Seare in 1867.
Pre-277	London Sunday Schools and Charles Seare	1854	1867–1874	28-foot non-self righting Whale Boat	(Note: Gift of the London Sunday Schools LB fund.); Sold in 1874.
Pre-444	Lady Vivian	1865	1874–1884	32-foot Prowse self-righting (P&S)	(Note: 32 ft 0 in (9.75 m) x 7 ft 6 in (2.29 m) (10-oared) Prowse-class self-righting (P&S) lifeboat, funded by the collections of Lady Vivian of Beaumaris, built by Forrestt of Limehouse, London, costing £248 when new.); Previously Pomfret and Goole at Tynemouth. Broken up in 1884.
68	Star of Hope	1884	1884–1892	34-foot Self-Righting (P&S)	(Note: 34 ft 0 in (10.36 m) x 8 ft 0 in (2.44 m) (10-oared) self-righting (P&S) lifeboat, gift of Mrs Atherton Howard of Cheltenham, built by Forrestt of Limehouse, London, costing £371.); Sold in 1892.
325	Star of Hope	1892	1892–1910	39-foot Self-Righting (P&S)	(Note: 39 ft 0 in (11.89 m) x 9 ft 0 in (2.74 m) (12-oared) self-righting (P&S) lifeboat, gift of Mrs Atherton Howard of Cheltenham, built by W. T. Ellis of Lowestoft, costing £384.); Sold in January 1911.
605	Charles and Eliza Laura	1910	1910–1929	40-foot Watson (P&S)	(Note: 40 ft 0 in (12.19 m) x 11 ft 0 in (3.35 m) (12-oared) Watson-class non-self-righting (P&S) lifeboat, legacy of Mrs S. Clark of London, built by Thames Ironworks of Blackwall, London, costing £1,589.); Sold in 1929. Renamed Salvor. In storage near Duns, Scottish Borders, April 2024.
462	Thomas Fielden	1901	1929	40-foot Watson (P&S)	(Note: 40 ft 0 in (12.19 m) x 11 ft 0 in (3.35 m) (12-oared) Watson-class non-self-righting (P&S) lifeboat, legacy of S. J. and J. Fielden of Todmorden, built by Thames Ironworks of Blackwall, London, costing £1,327 when new.); Previously at Barrow and Angle. Sold in 1929
581	Reserve No. 7D	1907	1929–1930	38-foot Watson (P&S)	(Note: 38 ft 0 in (11.58 m) x 9 ft 4 in (2.84 m) (12-oared) Watson-class non-self-righting (P&S) lifeboat, legacy of Miss M. M. Stephenson of Chelsea, built by Thames Ironworks of Blackwall, London, costing £1,121 when new.); Previously Maria Stephenson at Buckie. Transferred to Abersoch.

Pre ON numbers are unofficial numbers used by the Lifeboat Enthusiasts' Society to reference early lifeboats not included on the official RNLI list.

=== Motor lifeboats ===
ON	Op.No. (Note: Op. No. is the RNLI's Operational Number of the boat carried on the hull.)	Name	Built	On station	Class	Comments
724	–	G. W.	1929	1930–1956	40-foot 6in Watson	
922	–	Watkin Williams	1956	1956–1977	42-foot Watson	Transferred to Oban
1047	37-34	Horace Clarkson	1977	1977–1986	Rother	
932	–	Howard Marryat	1957	1986–1988	46-foot 9in Watson	Previously at Fishguard and Barrow.
1116	47-013	Robert and Violet	1987	1988–2013	Tyne	Transferred to Lough Swilly
1305	16-25	Kiwi	2012	2013–	Tamar	

More post-service details can be found on the respective lifeboat class pages.

=== Inshore lifeboats ===
==== D class ====
Op.No.	Name	On station	Class	Comments
D-67	Unnamed	1965	D-class (Dunlop)	
D-62	Unnamed	1965–1966	D-class (Dunlop)	
D-102	Unnamed	1966–1968	D-class (RFD PB16)	
D-54	Unnamed	1969	D-class (RFD PB16)	
D-133	Unnamed	1969–1974	D-class (RFD PB16)	
D-225	Unnamed	1975–1976	D-class (Zodiac III)	
D-144	Unnamed	1977–1980	D-class (RFD PB16)	
D-276	Gillian Powell	1980–1988	D-class (RFD PB16)	
D-381	Douglas	1989–1998	D-class (EA16)	
D-532	Kingsand	1998–2008	D-class (EA16)	
D-689	Enfys	2008–2018	D-class (IB1)	
D-825	Enfys II	2018–	D-class (IB1)	

== See also ==
- List of RNLI stations
- List of former RNLI stations
- Royal National Lifeboat Institution lifeboats
