= Thorpeness Lifeboat Station =

Former Lifeboat station in Suffolk, England

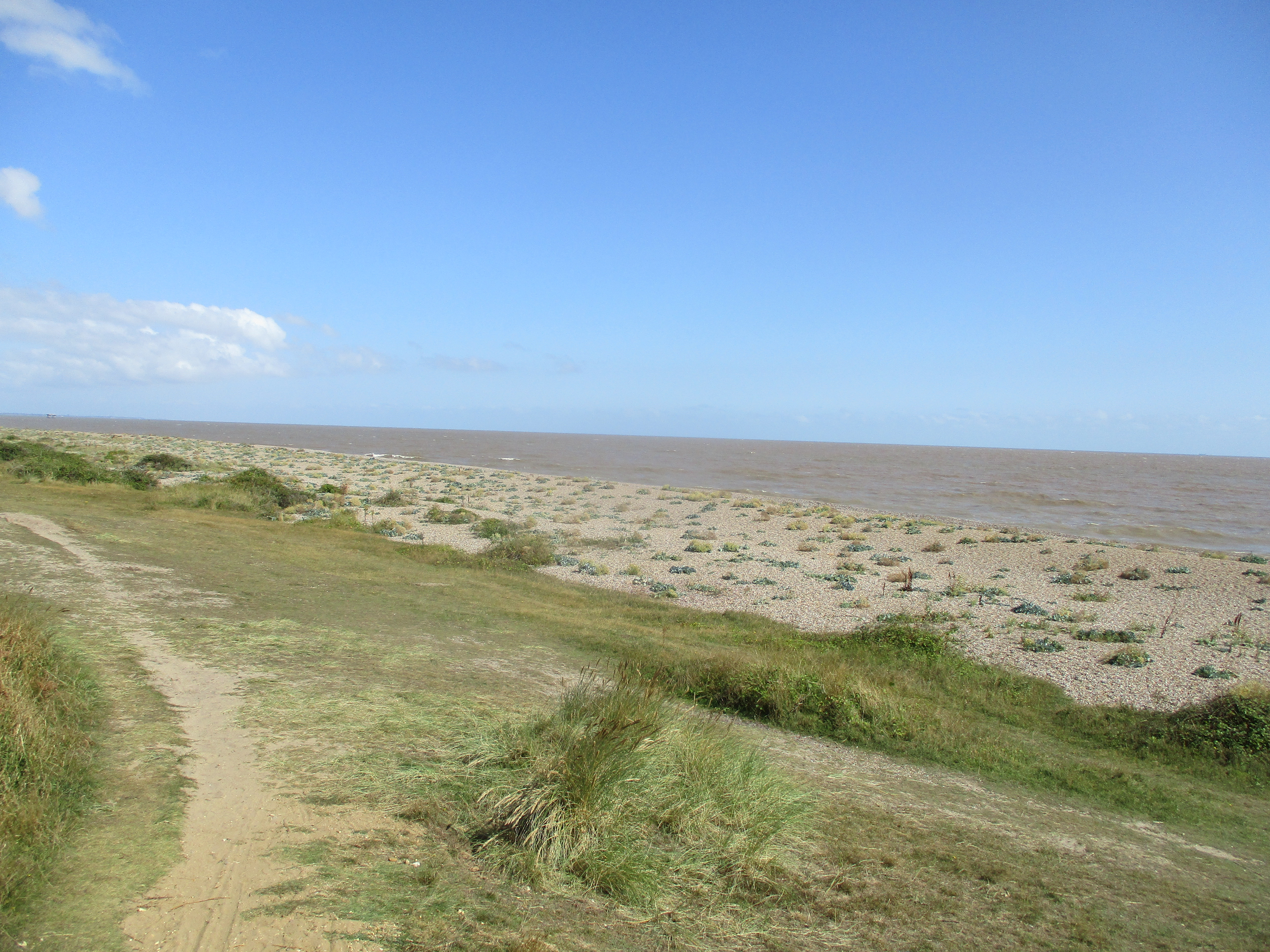
- Thorpe Ness

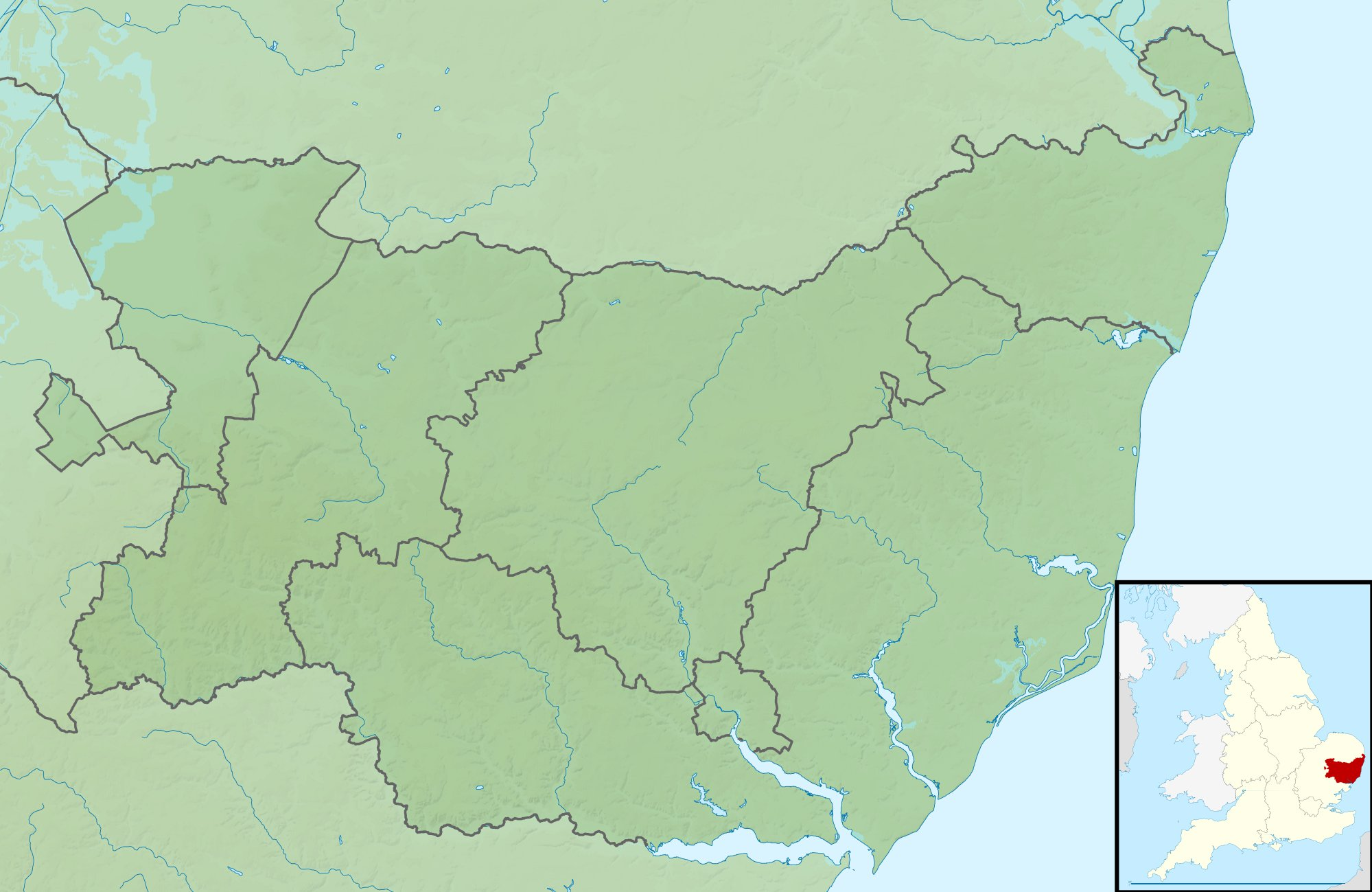
- Location within Suffolk

General information
- Type: Lifeboat station
- Location: Thorpeness, Suffolk, England
- Coordinates: 52.1898°N 1.6219°E
- Opened: 1853
- Closed: 1900
- Cost: Rebuilt 1864: £170

Thorpeness Lifeboat Station was located on the shore, 1 mile (1.6 km) north of Thorpe, a small village approximately 25 mi (40 km) north-east of Ipswich, in the county of Suffolk, on the east coast of England.

A lifeboat station was established at Thorpeness by the Suffolk Humane Society in 1853. Management of the station was transferred to the Royal National Lifeboat Institution (RNLI) in 1855.

The station operated for 47 years, until its closure in 1900.

== History ==
The Suffolk Humane Society provided a number of lifeboats along the coast of Suffolk where shallow water and sand banks create navigation problems for ships approaching harbours. In 1826, a 24-foot-long (7.3 m) lifeboat, Grafton, was stationed at Sizewell Gap, to the north of Thorpeness. In 1851, the boat was relocated to Aldeburgh, about 2 miles (3.2 km) south of Thorpeness.

Then, on 9 December 1851, Joshua Chard launched his own boat, and with four men, saved the crew of 10 of the schooner John of Newcastle-upon-Tyne, when it was wrecked at Thorpeness. Chard was subsequently awarded the RNIPLS Silver Medal.

This rescue may well have influenced the decision, as after a larger boat was placed at Aldeburgh in 1853, Grafton was relocated to a new station at Thorpeness. The RNIPLS contributed £30 towards the cost of a lifeboat house, and provided new gear.

At meeting of the committee of management on Thursday 5 October 1854, the title RNIPLS was changed to be the RNLI. At the same meeting, it was agreed to supply a launching sledge to the station at Thorpeness, replacing the usual carriage.

In 1855, the assets of the Suffolk Humane Society, including Thorpeness, were transferred to the management of the RNLI.

Soon afterwards, a 30 ft (9.1 m) self-righting lifeboat built by James Beeching was provided for the station. The Beeching lifeboat was one of a further 10 commissioned, after the boat-builder beat 280 other entries, and won the prize of 100 guineas, offered by The Duke of Northumberland for the Best Lifeboat design. However, almost immediately, problems had been encountered with the boats. Three boats, Lytham, Rhyl and Criccieth, capsized and failed to self-right, costing the lives of 14 lifeboat men. A damning report was issued by the RNLI, stating that the boats were not built to the standard of the prize-winning design. However, a lack of understanding of the self-righting capabilities may have contributed to some of the disasters, with crews cutting holes in the sealed airboxes to use for storage.

The boat, previously named Prudhoe at Boulmer, had already fallen out of favour with the crew there, and it too capsized whilst being towed back to Newcastle, after being replaced. The boat was sent for a refit, before its transfer to Thorpeness, where it was renamed The Thomas Chapman. The boat served Thorpeness for seven years with no incident, launching seven times, and saving 40 lives.

A second, or No. 2 station, was established at Thorpeness in 1860, with the placement of a smaller 26 ft (7.9 m) self-righting lifeboat, which had previously served at Newcastle. The lifeboat was on station for just three years, never being launched on service.

At a meeting of the committee of management on Thursday 6 February 1862, and following a visit and report by the Inspector of Lifeboats, the crew's request for a larger and more powerful lifeboat was agreed, and it was decided to appropriate the Ipswich lifeboat to the station.

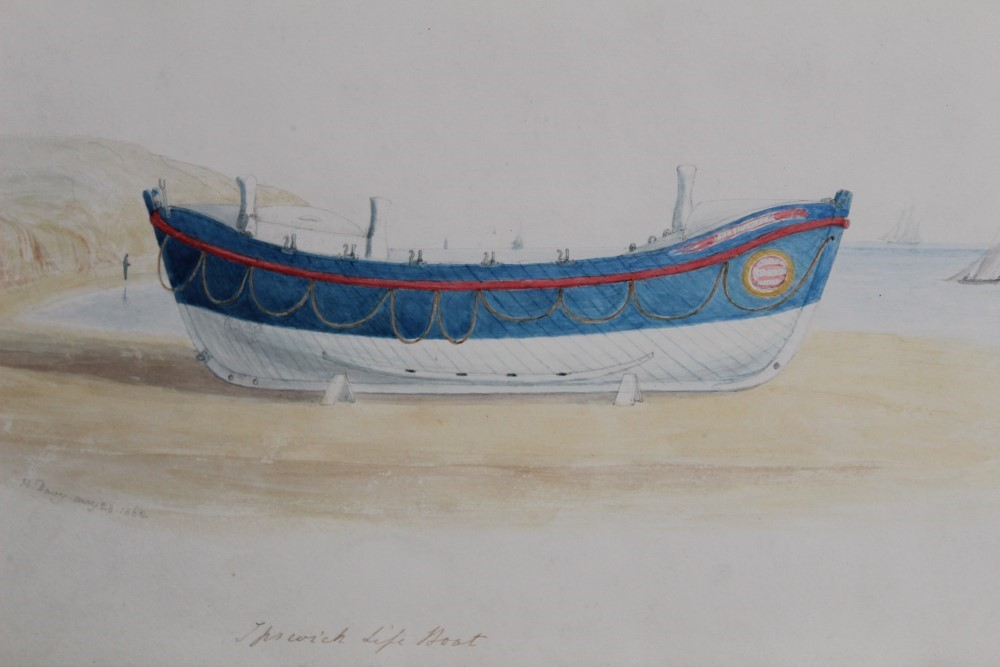
The 1862 Peake-class lifeboat Ipswich, a painting by Henry Davy

The inauguration of the Ipswich lifeboat was a grand occasion. Through the efforts of Mr Bateman Byng, the residents of the town of Ipswich had raised a total of £500 for the Ipswich Lifeboat Fund. A 33 ft (10 m) Peake-class self-righting 'Pulling and Sailing' (P&S) lifeboat, one with both sails and ten oars, was built by Forrestt of Limehouse, London, at a cost of £231. On 27 May, the lifeboat and carriage were transported from London to Ipswich free of charge, by the Eastern Counties Railway.

On Thursday 29 May, with the town adorned with flags, church bells ringing, the day declared a general holiday, and with a great crowd arriving in the town, a grand procession began to assemble in the Barrack Square. At 11:00, the procession commenced, the lifeboat drawn on its carriage by eight horses, supplied by Ramsomes of Ipswich. Following were the High Sheriff, the mayor and council officers, the Suffolk Militia Artillery and Walton Volunteer Artillery and respective bands, various members of benevolent societies, representatives of the RNLI, and the Coxswain and crew of the lifeboat.

The procession made its way to the head of the River Orwell estuary, where after a service by the Rev. William Walter Woodhouse of St. Clement's Church, the boat was named Ipswich, and then launched on demonstration.

A new boathouse was constructed at Thorpeness for the Ipswich, at a cost of £170.

On the night of the ll June 1863, in gale force conditions, the brig Florence Nightingale of London was stranded on Sizewell Bank. The Thorpeness lifeboat Ipswich arrived to find the masts collapsed, making rescue extremely difficult, but dropping anchor and veering down, the six crew were pulled from the wreck by lines. One of the lifeboat crew was washed overboard, but was kept afloat by his life-vest, and managed to regain the boat.

For this service, and taking into consideration earlier services, such as the rescue of four men from the barge Henry Everest of Rochester on 20 October 1862, the first service of the Ipswich, Coxswain William Alexander was awarded the RNLI Silver Medal, presented to him by George Bacon, mayor of Ipswich, on 16 July 1863.

In May 1873, following another request from the crew for a larger boat, the Ipswich was replaced, and a 37 ft (11 m) lifeboat placed on station. The new lifeboat was towed free of charge from the River Thames to its station by the Commercial Steam-Ship Company. The lifeboat was again named Ipswich, the Ipswich Lifeboat Fund having contributed annually to the Institution. In her 11 years on station, the departing lifeboat Ipswich had been launched 11 times, saving 34 lives. The boat was transferred to Rhoscolyn.

For his service over ten years as Coxswain, launching 34 times, and helping save 94 lives, Henry Spindler was awarded the RNLI Silver Medal in 1892.

At a ceremony witnessed by over 1000 people, what would turn out to be the last lifeboat placed at Thorpeness was named and launched on 8 July 1890. The cost of the 39 ft (12 m) lifeboat had been defrayed by Mrs North Graham of Brighton, and her family, and was named Christopher North Graham (ON 291), in memory of her late husband. After the ceremony, Mrs North Graham hosted afternoon tea in the marquee for 40 crew and boatmen.

At a meeting of the RNLI committee of management on Thursday 11 January 1900, it was decided that Thorpeness Lifeboat Station should be closed. The lifeboat on station, Christopher North Graham (ON 291), had never been launched in ten years, and was subsequently transferred to Littlehaven. No evidence of the station remains.

== Station honours ==
The following are awards made at Thorpeness:

- RNIPLS Silver Medal
  Joshua Chard, Boatman, H.M. Coastguard – 1851
- RNLI Silver Medal
  William Alexander, Coxswain – 1863
  Henry Spindler, Coxswain – 1892
- The Thanks of the Institution inscribed on Vellum
  H. P. Todd, Honorary Secretary – 1899

== Thorpeness lifeboats ==
The six lifeboats stationed at Thorpeness between 1853 and 1900 were all of the 'pulling and sailing' type, equipped with oars and sails. The first three were all older boats transferred from other stations. The residents of Ipswich contributed to a lifeboat fund which paid for the next two boats. The first of these was ceremonially launched into the river at Ipswich on 29 May 1862 before being brought the Thorpeness.

=== Thorpeness ===
On station	ON (Note: ON is the RNLI's Official Number of the boat.)	Name	Built	Class	Comments
1853–1855	Pre-118	Grafton	1826	24-foot Plenty Non-self-righting	(Note: 24 ft 0 in (7.32 m) x 8 ft 0 in (2.44 m) (8/10-oared) Plenty-class lifeboat, funded by the RNIPLS, built by William Plenty of Newbury, Berkshire, costing £168 when new.); Previously at Sizewell Gap and Aldeburgh
1855–1862	Pre-247	The Thomas Chapman	1852	30-foot Beeching Self-righting (P&S)	(Note: 30 ft 0 in (9.14 m) x 7 ft 9 in (2.36 m) (10-oared) Beeching-class self-righting (P&S) lifeboat, funded by The Duke of Northumberland, the RNIPLS, built by James Beeching of Great Yarmouth, costing £130 when new.); Previously Prudhoe at Boulmer. Transferred to Newhaven.
1862–1873	Pre-389	Ipswich	1862	33-foot Peake Self-righting	(Note: 33 ft 0 in (10.06 m) x 8 ft 0 in (2.44 m) (10-oared) Peake-class self-righting (P&S) lifeboat, funded by the Ipswich LB fund, built by Forrestt of Limehouse, London, costing £231.); Later at Rhoscolyn.
1873–1890	Pre-579	Ipswich	1873	37-foot Self-righting (P&S)	(Note: 37 ft 0 in (11.28 m) x 9 ft 4 in (2.84 m) (12-oared) self-righting (P&S) lifeboat, funded by the Ipswich LB fund, built by Forrestt of Limehouse, London, costing £410.); Sold in 1890
1890–1900	291	Christopher North Graham	1890	39-foot Self-righting (P&S)	(Note: 39 ft 0 in (11.89 m) x 9 ft 0 in (2.74 m) (12-oared) self-righting (P&S) lifeboat, gift of Mrs North Graham and family of Brighton, built by Forrestt of Limehouse, London, costing £577.); Transferred to Littlehaven when Thorpeness was closed.

Pre ON numbers are unofficial numbers used by the Lifeboat Enthusiasts' Society to reference early lifeboats not included on the official RNLI list.

=== Thorpeness No. 2 ===
On station	ON	Name	Built	Class	Comments
1860–1863	Pre-296	Unnamed	1855	26-foot Peake Self-righting	(Note: 26 ft 0 in (7.92 m) x 6 ft 0 in (1.83 m) (6-oared) Peake-class self-righting (P&S) lifeboat, funded by the RNLI, built by Forrestt of Limehouse, London, costing £161 when new.); Previously at Newcastle. Sold in 1864.

== See also ==
- List of RNLI stations
- List of former RNLI stations
- Royal National Lifeboat Institution lifeboats
