= Rhosneigr Lifeboat Station =

Former lifeboat station in Anglesey, Wales

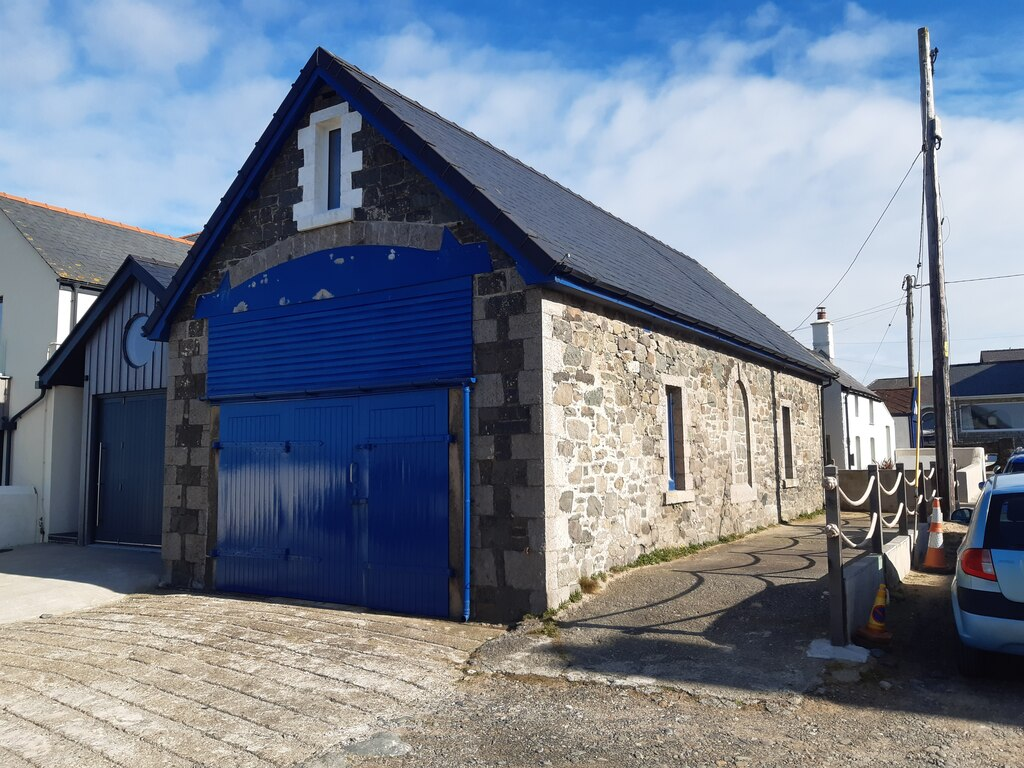
- Rhosneigr Lifeboat House

- Rhosneigr, Anglesey

General information
- Status: Closed
- Type: RNLI Lifeboat Station
- Location: Lifeboat House, Rhosneigr, Anglesey, LL64 5YZ, Wales
- Coordinates: 53°13′35.1″N 4°31′23.6″W
- Opened: 1872
- Closed: 1924

Rhosneigr Lifeboat Station was located Rhosneigr, a village located to the south of Holy Island, on the west coast of the Isle of Anglesey, Wales.

A lifeboat station was established at Rhosneigr by the Royal National Lifeboat Institution (RNLI) in 1872.

With just 7 launches and 2 lives saved in the previous 20 years, Rhosneigr Lifeboat Station closed in 1924.

== History ==
In 1872, following a series of shipwrecks in Rhosneigr Bay, application was made to the RNLI by the local residents, who pledged their cooperation and financial support. Following the visit of the assistant Inspector of Lifeboats, and his report to the RNLI committee of management on 7 March 1872, and with sufficient local crew available, the application was agreed at further meeting committee on Thursday 4 April 1872. It was also agreed to appropriate the gift to the Institution of £680 from Mrs Selina Lingham of Lower Norwood, London, to the station.

A tablet of Aubigny Stone was placed on the front of the building:–

THIS LIFEBOAT STATION
WAS PRESENTED
TO THE
ROYAL NATIONAL LIFEBOAT INSTITUTION
BY THE WIDOW OF
THOMAS LINGHAM ESQ.
FORMERLY OF THE CITY OF WORCESTER, AND LATE OF
VINCENT LODGE, LOWER NORWOOD ROAD, LONDON
AS AN AFFECTIONATE MEMORIAL OF ONE WHOSE WARM
HEART, THROUGHOUT A LONG LIFE, EVER GLOWED
WITH LOVING-KINDNESS TOWARDS MAN, AND
HUMBLE FAITH AND TRUST IN GOD
––––––
"The Lord on high is mightier than the noise of many waters, yes,
than the mighty waves of the sea."—Ps.xciii.v.4.

A 30-foot self-righting 'Pulling and Sailing' (P&S) lifeboat, one with sails and (10) oars, was ordered, at a cost of £238-15s, and a boathouse was constructed, costing a further £254-5s-0d. On 19 September 1872, the lifeboat was taken in procession to the beach, where it was formally handed to the RNLI. After a short service by Rev. R Williams, Mrs Lingham named the lifeboat Thomas Lingham, in memory of her late husband.

An extraordinary rescue took place on 30 March 1883. Called to the aid of the vessel Norman Court of Greenock, the Rhosneigr lifeboat was beaten by the conditions, and also lost a crew member when he was washed overboard. The Holyhead lifeboat was towed to the scene by steam tug, but they too failed to reach the wreck, returning to Holyhead. The Rocket Brigade then failed to get a line to the wreck. The Rhosneigr crew launched once more, only to be beaten by the conditions again, returning to station absolutely exhausted. A request was made for a replacement crew from Holyhead, with the Holyhead railway company arranging an engine to transport the crew. This time, the Holyhead crew in the Rhosneigr boat were successful, and 20 men were rescued from the Norman Court. Holyhead coxswain Thomas Roberts received the RNLI Silver Medal.

A tragedy struck Rhosneigr on 28 December 1894, when a young man was run over by the lifeboat carriage during the launch. No effective service was carried out, and William Roberts died of his injuries a few days later.

There would be four lifeboats stationed at Rhosneigr between 1872 and 1924. Such was the financial support of Mrs Lingham, and her later bequest, all lifeboats at Rhosneigr bore the name Thomas Lingham. In 1897, Thomas Lingham (ON 277) was called to the aid of the Ann Jane of Portmadoc, in Cymyran Bay. The 3½ ton lifeboat was pulled 3 miles along sand and through a river to reach a launching point, but managed to rescue the five crew and one passenger. When the lifeboat was replaced in 1904, the lighter 34-foot Self-righting (Rubie) lifeboat was provided, the Thomas Lingham (ON 533), weighing just 2 tons 6 cwts.

Rhosneigr had been a relatively busy station when it first opened, with 45 lives saved in 13 years, 10 lives saved in 1890, and 13 rescued in the following 13 years. But calls and rescues had dramatically reduced in the early 1900s, and the decision was made to close Rhosneigr Lifeboat Station in 1924.

The boathouse still stands, and is currently a boathouse / store. The lifeboat on station at the time of closure, Thomas Lingham (ON 533), was transferred to the reserve fleet, until being sold in 1937. The boat is currently with Holyhead Maritime Museum for restoration.

== Roll of honour ==
In memory of those lost whilst serving Rhosneigr lifeboat.

- Washed overboard and lost, whilst on service to the Norman Court of Greenock, 30 March 1883.

Crew Member

- Run over by the lifeboat carriage during launch on 28 December 1894, and died a few days later.

W. Roberts (32)

== 1941 Blackburn Botha Disaster ==
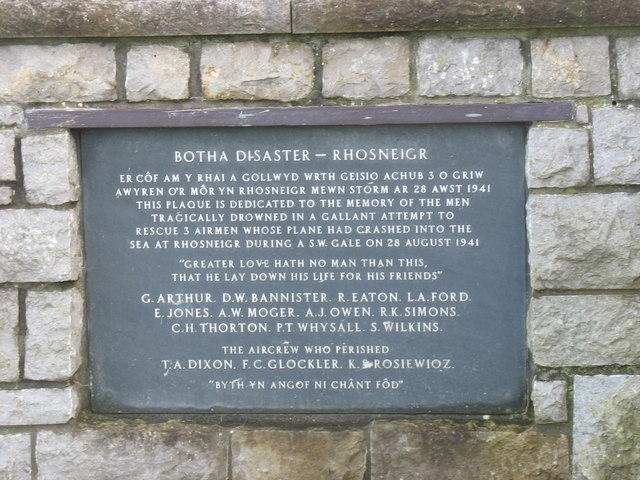

On 28 August 1941, an RAF Blackburn Botha L6417 departing RAF Valley with three crew aboard, attempted to abort take-off, and crashed into the sea off Rhosneigr, in gale force conditions and particularly rough seas. With no lifeboat at Rhosneigr, and with the Holyhead lifeboat away for repairs, the nearest lifeboat was two hours away at Porthdinllaen.

Stewart Wood and Derrick Baynham, both aged 17, set out in a small dinghy to effect a rescue. They reached the plane, taking the pilot on board, but then their dinghy capsized, and the two boys were lucky to survive. Nine men launched a boat to the rescue, but that also capsized. Some people who tried to swim out to the aircraft were also drowned. In all, 11 men died trying in vain to save the three airmen, who all perished. Wood and Baynham were each awarded the George Medal and the RNLI Silver Medal. A further 11 awards were made of the RNLI Bronze Medal, seven of which were posthumous.

In 1991, a memorial was placed outside Rhosneigr fire station to commemorate those lost:

Sgt. Kazinierz Stefan Rosiewicz, Pilot (24)
Thomas Alexander Dixon, Aircrew (20)
Frederick Charles Glockler, Aircrew (27)
Evan Jones, Boatman, H.M. Coastguard (39)
Alfred W. Moger, Battery Sergeant Major, RA (34)
Arthur J. Owen, Second Officer, Merchant Navy (36)
Peter T. Whysall, Second Lieutenant, RA (23)

Clarence H. Thornton, Gunner, RA (20)
Reginald Eaton, Gunner, RA (20)
George C. Arthur, Policeman (29)
Sydney Wilkins, Gunner, RA (33)
Ronald K. Simons, Gunner, RA (33)
Leslie A. Ford, Aircrew (29)
Donald W. Bannister, Aircraftsman (20)

The following awards were made at Rhosneigr following the crash:

- George Medal
- RNLI Silver Medal
- Cigarette case, awarded by General Sikorski, Commander of Polish forces

Derek Hubert Baynham, schoolboy – 1942
John Leslie Stewart Wood, schoolboy – 1942

- RNLI Bronze Medal

C. Jackson, Sergeant, RA – 1942
T. Taylor, Lance Bombardier, RA – 1942
J. W. Parkinson, Gunner, RA – 1942
Albert E. Atkinson, Aircraftman 1, RAF – 1942
George C. Arthur, Policeman – 1942 (post.)
Reginald Eaton, Gunner, RA – 1942 (post.)
Evan Jones, Boatman, H.M. Coastguard – 1942 (post.)
Alfred W. Moger, Battery Sergeant Major, RA – 1942 (post.)
Arthur J. Owen, Second Officer, Merchant Navy – 1942 (post.)
Clarence H. Thornton, Gunner, RA – 1942 (post.)
Peter T. Whysall, Second Lieutenant, RA – 1942 (post.)

== Rhosneigr lifeboats ==
ON (Note: ON is the RNLI's Official Number of the boat.)	Name	Built	On station	Class	Comments
Pre-569	Thomas Lingham	1872	1872–1885	30-foot Self-righting (P&S)	(Note: 30-foot x 7-foot 6in (10-oared) self-righting (P&S) lifeboat, gift of Mrs Lingham of Worcester and Lower Norwood, built by Woolfe of Shadwell, London, costing £239.)
Pre-641	Thomas Lingham	1879	1885–1890	32-foot Prowse Self-righting (P&S)	(Note: 32-foot x 7-foot 6in (10-oared) Prowse-class self-righting (P&S) lifeboat, gift of Mrs Lingham of Lower Norwood, built by Woolfe of Shadwell, London, costing £282 when new.); Previously Joseph Sykes at Upgang.
277	Thomas Lingham	1890	1890–1903	34-foot Self-righting (P&S)	(Note: 34-foot x 7-foot 6in (10-oared) self-righting (P&S) lifeboat, gift of Mrs Lingham of Lower Norwood, built by Woolfe of Shadwell, London, costing £418.)
533	Thomas Lingham	1904	1904–1924	34-foot Dungeness Self-righting (P&S)	(Note: 34-foot x 8-foot (10-oared) Dungeness-class (Rubie) self-righting (P&S) lifeboat, gift of Mrs Lingham of Lower Norwood, built by Thames Ironworks of Blackwall, London, costing £718.)

Pre ON numbers are unofficial numbers used by the Lifeboat Enthusiast Society to reference early lifeboats not included on the official RNLI list.

== See also ==
- List of RNLI stations
- List of former RNLI stations
- Royal National Lifeboat Institution lifeboats
