= Palmer-class lifeboat =

Rescue lifeboat class

The Palmer-class lifeboat was an early design of small lifeboat used by the Royal National Institution for the Preservation of Life from Shipwreck (RNIPLS) in the middle years of the nineteenth century.

== Design ==
George Palmer was a London businessman. He joined the committee of the RNIPLS in 1826, just two years after its founding, and later became its deputy chairman. One of the organisation's activities was to provide lifeboats and it bought them from several sources. Palmer offered a design based on a whaleboat, narrow and pointed at both ends. It was given extra buoyancy by the use of cork fittings and air chambers.

== Palmer lifeboats ==
LBES No.	Name	Built	Builder	Cost	In service	Station	Length	Oars	Comments
—	Mariner's Friend	Jan 1827	Tredwen, Padstow	£50	1827–1856	Padstow	23 ft 0 in (7.01 m)	4	
Pre-127	—	Mar 1827	Shore, Blackwall	£95	1832–1838	Holy Island	27 ft 0 in (8.23 m)	6	
Pre-127	—	Mar 1827	Shore, Blackwall	£95	1838–1851	North Sunderland	27 ft 0 in (8.23 m)	6	
Pre-128	—	1828			1828–1841	Newburgh			
Pre-131	—	May 1828	Taylor, Blackwall	£55	1828–1853	Cemlyn	25 ft 8 in (7.82 m)	5 or 6	
Pre-131	—	May 1828	Taylor, Blackwall	£55	1853–1859	Rhoscolyn	25 ft 8 in (7.82 m)	5 or 6	
—	—	Jun 1828	Harton, Limehouse	£56	1828–1851	Barmouth	26 ft 0 in (7.92 m)	6	
Pre-133	—	Jun 1828	Taylor	£55	1828–1836	Peel	26 ft 0 in (7.92 m)	6	
—	—	Apr 1829	Harton		1829–1843	Teesmouth	26 ft 6 in (8.08 m)	6	
Pre-144	—	May 1829	McVeagh, Holyhead	£60	1828–1858	Holyhead	32 ft 0 in (9.75 m)	8	Palmer design modified by Sparrow.
Pre-145	—	May 1829	McVeagh	£60	1830	Beaumaris	26 ft 3 in (8.00 m)	6	Palmer design modified by Sparrow.
Pre-145	—	May 1829	McVeagh	£60	1830–1853	Rhoscolyn	26 ft 3 in (8.00 m)	6	Palmer design modified by Sparrow.
Pre-149	—	1829	Harton	£55	1829–1843	Ramsey	26 ft 0 in (7.92 m)	6	
Pre-150	Assistance	Mar 1830	Harton	£57	1832–1857	Appledore	26 ft 0 in (7.92 m)	6	
Pre-151	—	Aug 1830	Harton	£60	1831–1848	Penmon	26 ft 0 in (7.92 m)	5 or 6	
Pre-151	—	Aug 1830	Harton	£60	1848–1853	Moelfre	26 ft 0 in (7.92 m)	5 or 6	
Pre-151	—	Aug 1830	Harton	£60	1853–1865	Cemlyn	26 ft 0 in (7.92 m)	5 or 6	
Pre-155	—	1831	Harton	£60	1832–1842	Tynemouth	26 ft 0 in (7.92 m)	6	
Pre-156	—	May 1831	Harton	£59	1832–1856	Rye	26 ft 0 in (7.92 m)	6	
Pre-161	—	1833	Harton	£60	1836–1838	Dymchurch	25 ft 0 in (7.62 m)		
Pre-165	—	1834	Harton	£65	1835–1843	Laugharne			
Pre-166	—	1834	Harton	£63	1835–1852	Berwick-upon-Tweed	26 ft 0 in (7.92 m)	6	
Pre-168	—	Sep 1835	Harton	£62	1835–1851	Mostyn			
—	—	Oct 1835	Harton	£62	1836–1851	Swansea	26 ft 6 in (8.08 m)	6	
—	—	Jul 1836	Taylor	£67	1836–1846	Burnham-on-Sea	26 ft 3 in (8.00 m)	6	For the port of Bridgwater.
—	—	1837	Taylor	£70	1837–1858	Brighton	28 ft 2 in (8.59 m)	10	Operated by the Brighton Humane Society.
Pre-178	Victoria	Jun 1837	Taylor	£68	1837–1859	Aberdovey	26 ft 0 in (7.92 m)	6	
—	—	Mar 1839	Taylor	£76	1839–1857	Youghal	27 ft 0 in (8.23 m)	6	
Pre-184	Heroine	1839			1839–1851	Humber	25 ft 6 in (7.77 m)		Initially with no name, later becoming Heroine.
Pre-184	Heroine	1839			1851–1857	Hornsea			Initially with no name, later becoming Heroine.
Pre-187	—	1839	Taylor	£70	1839–1855	Rosslare Fort	27 ft 0 in (8.23 m)	5	
—	—	1839	Harton		1839–1855	Robin Hood's Bay			
Pre-196	—	May 1840	Taylor	£76	1840–1861	Llanddwyn	27 ft 0 in (8.23 m)	5 or 6	
Pre-197	—	Jul 1840	Taylor	£77	1844–1855	Derrynane	26 ft 0 in (7.92 m)	5 or 6	
—	—	Jan 1843	Taylor	£77	1844–1855	Aberystwyth	26 ft 9 in (8.15 m)	6	
Pre-208	—	Jul 1844	Taylor	£72	1844–1853	Abersoch	26 ft 0 in (7.92 m)	6	
—	—	Mar 1847	Taylor	£73	1847–1857	Kilmore	26 ft 0 in (7.92 m)	5 or 6	
Pre-224	—	1848	Costain, Liverpool		1848–1857	Penmon	26 ft 0 in (7.92 m)	6	
—	—	1852	Teasdel, Yarmouth		1852–1858	Palling	32 ft 0 in (9.75 m)		
—	—					Cromer			
—	—					Redcar			

== Later whale boats ==
Most lifeboats built from the 1850s were of the Peake self-righting type but some whale boat lifeboats continued to be provided to stations where there was a need for a small boat, the last being built in 1910 and withdrawn in 1938.

ON	Name	Built	Length	In service	Station	Comments
280	Henley	1889	30 ft 3 in (9.22 m)	1890–1893	Tramore	
376	Captain Hans Busk	1869	28 ft 8 in (8.74 m)	1869–1905	Ryde	Retained as a boarding boat until 1910.
481	Richard Cresswell	1902	29 ft 1 in (8.86 m)	1902–1910	Poolbeg	
481	Richard Cresswell	1902	29 ft 1 in (8.86 m)	1910–1931	Campbeltown No. 2	
551	Selina	1905	30 ft 0 in (9.14 m)	1905–1923	Ryde	Sold in 1923 and now awaiting restoration.
615	John Watson Wakefield	1910	30 ft 0 in (9.14 m)	1910–1938	Poolbeg	

== See also ==
- List of RNLI stations
- List of former RNLI stations
- Royal National Lifeboat Institution lifeboats
