= Llangoed Common =

Coordinates: 53°17′54″N 4°05′18″W

Llangoed Common is a local nature reserve on Anglesey.

The common is located North of the village of Llangoed just off the B5109 and not far from Castell Aberlleiniog. This common land was once grazed by the villagers' cattle, but long since abandoned it has developed into wet woodland of willow and alder.
