= Llanddona Common =

Coordinates: 53.293301°N 4.130588°W

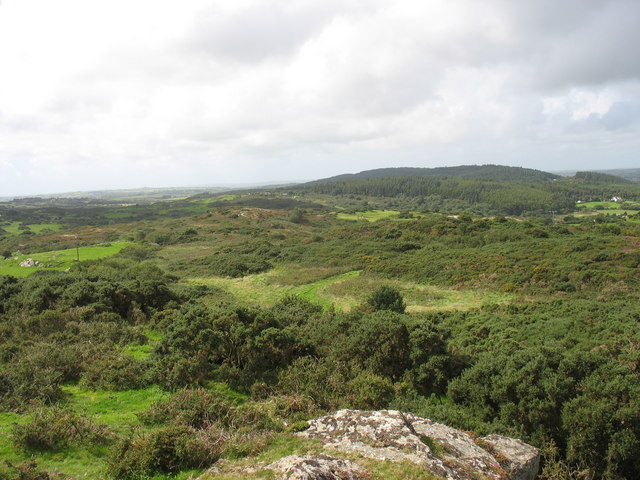

Llanddona Common is a Local Nature Reserve on Anglesey, in Wales. The common comprises a number of smaller parcels of land.
