= Bodlondeb Woods =

Woodland in Conwy, Wales

Coordinates: 53.286°N 3.833°W

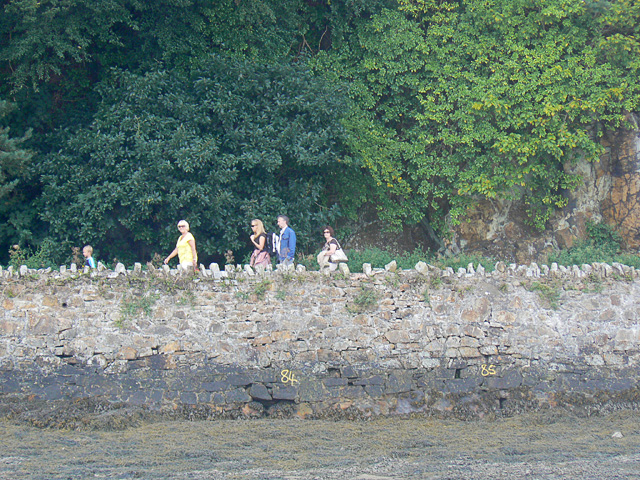
The edge of Bodlondeb Woods at the Conwy estuary.

Bodlondeb Woods is a woodland local nature reserve in Conwy, Wales. Located on the western shore of the Conwy estuary, the woodland is a mix of coniferous and deciduous trees. The woodland covers an area of 7.6 hectares (19 acres) and a number of footpaths run through it.
