= Shepherds Friendly Society =

British friendly society

- Type: Friendly Society
- Founded: 1826
- Headquarters: Shepherds Friendly, Haw Bank House, Cheadle, SK8 1AL, England
- Products: Long-term insurance and investment products
- Website: www.shepherdsfriendly.co.uk

Shepherds Friendly Society is a UK friendly society and one of the oldest mutual insurers in the world.

It is an incorporated society in the United Kingdom within the meaning of the Friendly Societies Act 1992. It has over 100,000 members.

== History ==
The Industrial Revolution led to major changes in society, with village communities diminishing and new towns and industries springing up. As there was no state provision for the poor, mutual aid organisations known as friendly societies were established to help families against hardship brought about by illness or death. Such societies began as locally based groups, whose members contributed a small amount each month so that payouts could be made to those in need, with the rest of the money received either saved or invested.

Shepherds Friendly started life as a sickness and benefits society, Ashton Unity, which was formed in Ashton-under-Lyne, Lancashire on Christmas Day in 1826. It was later renamed as the Loyal Order of Ancient Shepherds, "loyal" referring to the Crown and "shepherds" to the Nativity of Jesus. Its objects were "to relieve the sick, bury the dead, and assist each other in all cases of unavoidable distress, so far as in our power lies, and for the promotion of peace and goodwill towards the human race". It later spread across the country, organised into local branches; like other friendly societies such as the Oddfellows, these were known as 'lodges', and officers wore regalia somewhat similar to those of freemasons. By 1914 the membership had grown to 143,000. The Ancient Shepherds raised substantial funds from its members to support charities, presenting two lifeboats to the RNLI in the 1800s, and supported the Red Cross and YMCA in the Second World War.

Various similar mutual associations have since amalgamated with it, including the Royal Shepherds Sanctuary Benefit Society which was established in Yorkshire in the early 19th century, and the Ancient Order of Shepherds.

== Current products ==
Shepherds Friendly Society has changed from a traditional insurance provider to a modern diversified financial services organisation. It offers a range of savings, protection and insurance plans for its members.
