= Cytir Mawr =

Coordinates: 53.250°N 4.131°W

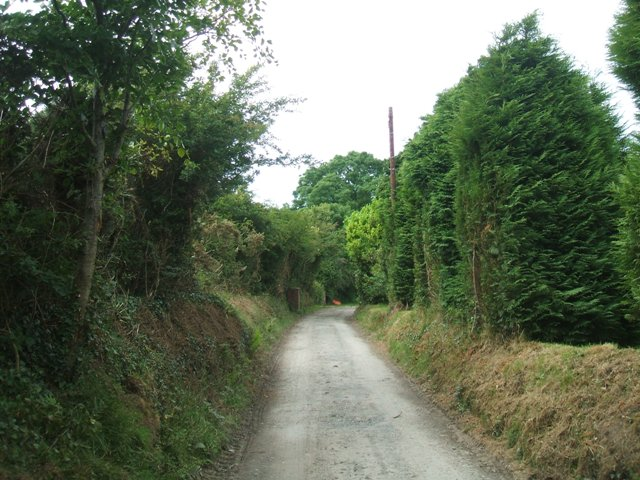
Public footpath to Cyttir Mawr

Cytir Mawr (also written as Cyttir Mawr) is a local nature reserve in Llandegfan, Anglesey, Wales.

== History ==
In July 2006, the site was designated as a local nature reserve. The reserve had previously been owned by Cardiff University but had been donated back to Anglesey.
