= Trwyn yr Wylfa =

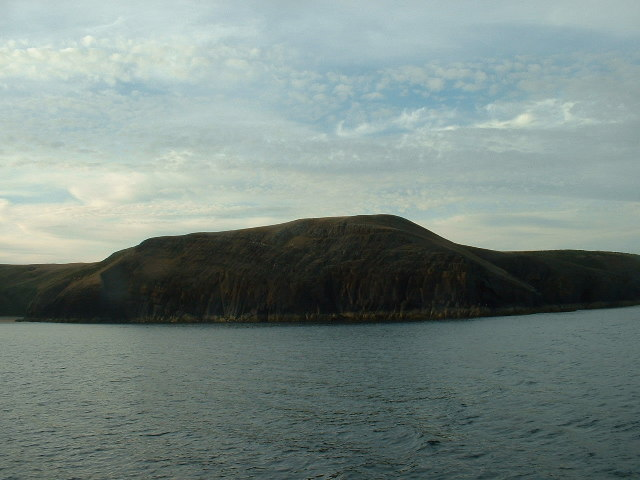
Trywn yr Wylfa

Trwyn yr Wylfa (also Wylfa Head) is a local nature reserve on Anglesey, Wales. The reserve occupies a small headland on the northern coast of the island and the Wales Coast Path follows the coastline through the reserve.
