= Llanfair-yng-Nghornwy =

Village in Anglesey, Wales

Coordinates: 53.391946°N 4.551667°W

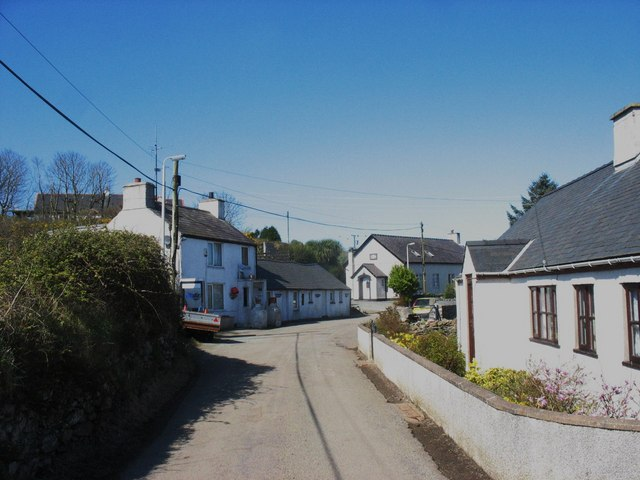

- Location within Anglesey
- Community: Cylch-y-Garn
- Principal area: Anglesey
- Preserved county: Gwynedd
- Country: Wales
- Sovereign state: United Kingdom
- Post town: HOLYHEAD
- Postcode district: LL65
- Dialling code: 01407
- Police: North Wales
- Fire: North Wales
- Ambulance: Welsh
- UK Parliament: Ynys Môn
- Senedd Cymru – Welsh Parliament: Bangor Conwy Môn

Llanfair-yng-Nghornwy (Welsh pronunciation, also spelt Llanfairynghornwy) is a village in Anglesey, in north-west Wales. A sparsely populated parish, it contains two well known geographical features; Carmel Head and, offshore, The Skerries islands with their lighthouse.

Until 1984, Llanfairynghornwy was a community. Today it is part of the community of Cylch-y-Garn.

== Notable people ==
James Williams, founder of the Anglesey Association of the Preservation of Lives from Shipwreck, was rector of St. Mary's Church in the village.

== See also ==
- St Mary's Church, Llanfair-yng-Nghornwy
