= James Williams (priest, died 1872) =

Welsh cleric

James Williams (baptized 26 July 1790 – 24 March 1872) was a Welsh cleric. Williams was the great-grandfather of famous Welsh artist Kyffin Williams.

== Life ==
James Williams was the son of John Williams, the rector of Llanddeusant church, St Caffo's Church, Llangaffo, and St Mary's Church, Llanfair-yng-Nghornwy (all parishes on the island of Anglesey, North Wales). John Williams was the younger brother of Thomas Williams, the Welsh copper industrialist. James Williams was educated at Jesus College, Oxford, matriculating in 1807, and obtaining his Bachelor of Arts degree in 1810. He was a Fellow of Jesus College from 1813 to 1822, and was awarded a Bachelor of Divinity degree in 1820. After being ordained, he was appointed curate of St Mary's Church, Llanfairpwllgwyngyll and St Gredifael's Church, Penmynydd (both on Anglesey) in 1814. He left these parishes in 1821 to succeed his father in his parish positions on his father's retirement. He became chancellor of Bangor Cathedral in 1851.

Williams helped to establish the Anglesey Association of the Preservation of Lives from Shipwreck, in the wake of a storm that caused a boat to sink with 140 deaths. The association later became part of the Royal National Lifeboat Institution. The 19th-century antiquarian Angharad Llwyd, who wrote a history of Anglesey at a time when Williams was at St Mary’s, noted that "this benevolent gentleman, aided by his lady, ever alert in the cause of humanity, are generally among the first on the shore, in case of accident, well supplied with restoratives, and other necessaries, to comfort and protect the suffering mariners."

Williams was a magistrate and also had an interest in agriculture, contributing some notes to a book on cattle breeding in 1869. He was an enthusiastic supporter of the National Eisteddfod. He was also instrumental, with Morris Williams, in the introduction of John Rhys, who at that time was teaching in Anglesey, to Charles Williams, Principal of Jesus College, which led to Rhys obtaining a scholarship to study at the college. Rhys went on to become the first Jesus Professor of Celtic at the University of Oxford and Principal of Jesus College itself.

== Other family members ==
His elder brother, John Williams, also studied at Jesus College and became a barrister. One of John Williams' grandsons was Ralph Champneys Williams, who later became Governor of the Windward Islands and Governor of Newfoundland.

Williams married Frances Lloyd, who painted in watercolours to help fundraise for the Anglesey Association of the Preservation of Lives from Shipwreck, and who sailed with Williams to the Skerries to nurse the lighthouse keeper when he was ill. The couple had four children; the oldest, Owen Lloyd Williams, trained as a coxswain as well as becoming a rector in Boduan.
