= Fishguard Lifeboat Station =

RNLI lifeboat station in Pembrokeshire, Wales

- Gorsaf Bad Achub Abergwaun-A-Wdig

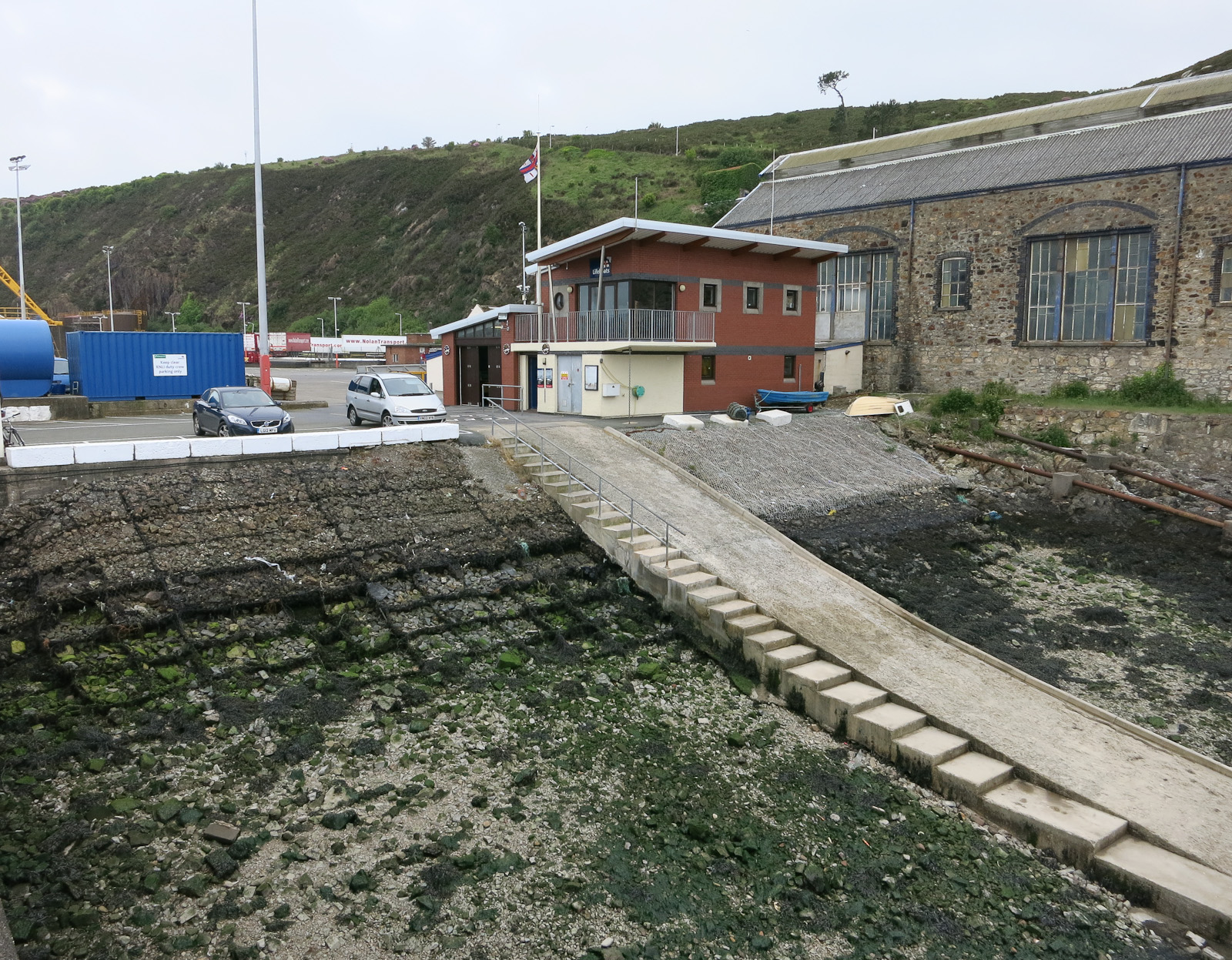
- Fishguard Lifeboat Station

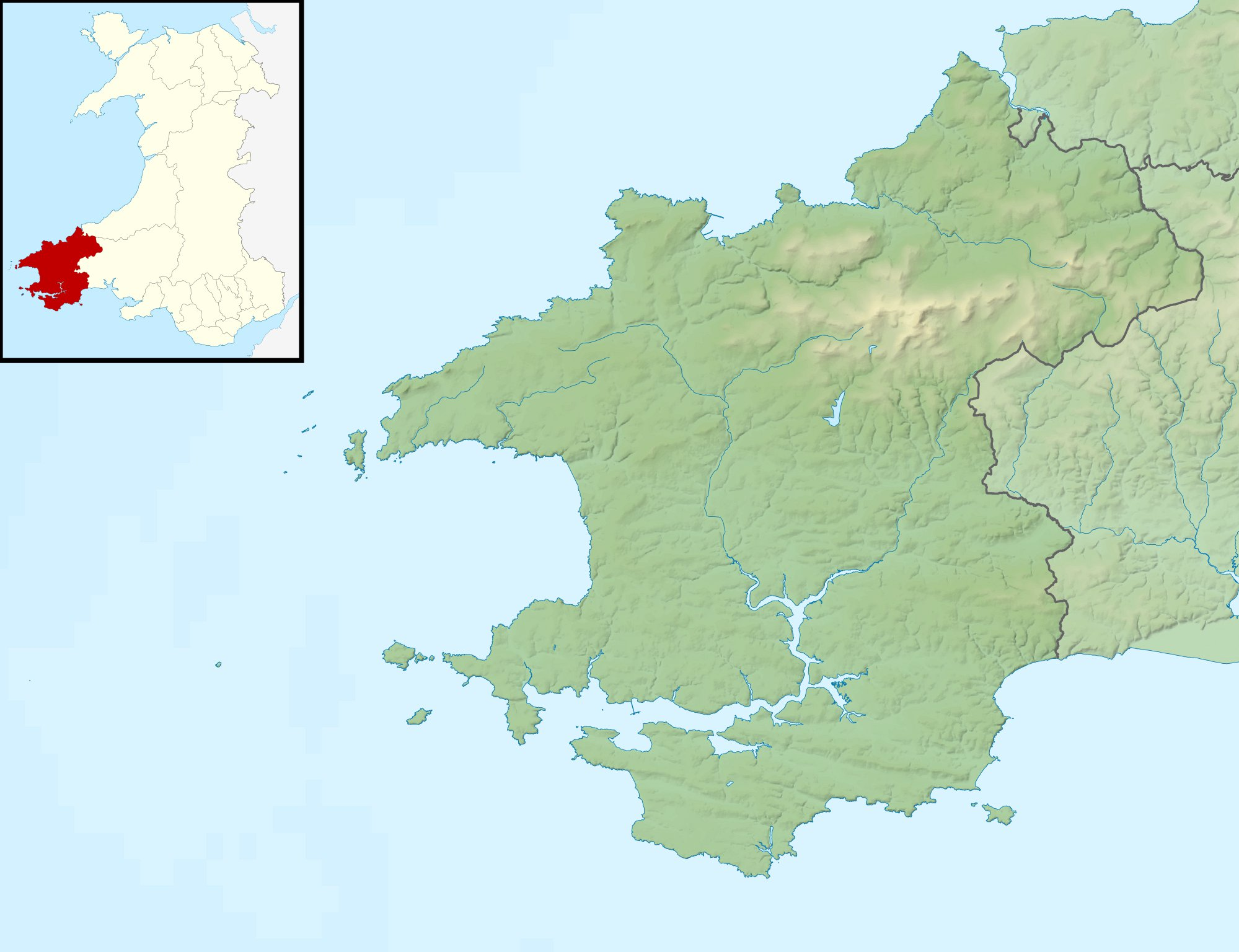
- Location within Pembrokeshire

General information
- Type: RNLI Lifeboat Station
- Location: North Breakwater, Fishguard Harbour, Goodwick, Pembrokeshire, Wales, SA64 0BU, UK
- Coordinates: 52°0′48.0″N 4°59′03.0″W
- Opened: 1822 / RNLI 1855
- Owner: Royal National Lifeboat Institution

Website
- Fishguard RNLI Lifeboat Station

Map of Fishguard Bay, Pembrokeshire, with the location of the Lifeboat Station.

Fishguard Lifeboat Station (Welsh: Gorsaf Bad Achub Abergwaun-A-Wdig) is located on the quay, at the northern breakwater of Fishguard Harbour, in the community of Fishguard and Goodwick, overlooking the southern end of Cardigan Bay, in the county of Pembrokeshire, Wales.

A private lifeboat was first placed at Fishguard in 1822. A station was re-established by the Royal National Lifeboat Institution (RNLI) station in 1855.

The station currently operates a Trent-class All-weather lifeboat, 14-03 Blue Peter VII (ON 1198), on station since 1994, and an D-class (IB1) Inshore lifeboat Edward Arthur Richardson (D-789), on station since 2015. It is one of the seven stations that has had a lifeboat funded by the BBC children's television series Blue Peter.

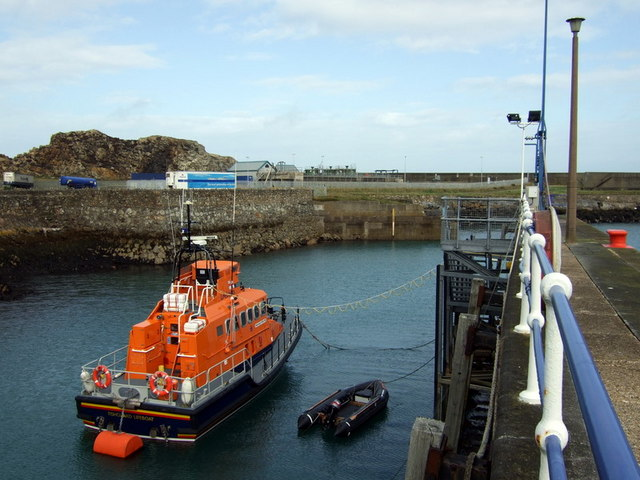
Trent class lifeboat Blue Peter VII on station at Fishguard

== History ==
A private lifeboat began service at Fishguard in 1822, built and operated by Lt. Thomas Evans RN, (later Captain), the agent in Fishguard for Lloyd's of London. Evans had constructed the boat himself, mostly at his own cost, and with a £50 grant from Lloyds. On 29–30 November 1833, Evans and his crew rescued the Master and crew from the sloop Ranger, and was subsequently awarded the RNIPLS Silver Medal.

The Fishguard lifeboat, with Evans aboard, rescued the Master and six crew of the schooner Trieve (or Trevor) on 17 February 1836. Eight years later, having discovered that an award of £10 had been made to the lifeboat men for this service, he pointed out that he has been responsible for the construction and maintenance of the lifeboat, at a personal cost of £500, during which time, 25 lives had been saved. "For long continuing exertions in the cause of humanity", Evans was awarded a special RNIPLS Silver Medal, double gilt, with a gold swivel ring.

A further six silver medals were awarded for rescues around Fishguard before 1855, including two medals to sisters Martha and Margaret Llewellyn, who waded into the surf, to rescue three men from the smack Margaret of Barmouth on 22 October 1846.

At a meeting of the RNLI committee of management on 7 Dec 1854, it was resolved to place a 30-foot lifeboat, of Mr Peake's design, at Fishguard, Pembrokeshire, and instructions were given for the provision of a boathouse.

A local committee had been formed, and Rev. C. H. Barham, of Trecwn was elected Chairman, "a gentleman possessed of large fortune, and of the still more valuable gifts — a liberal mind and philanthropic disposition". The committee, having raised the amount of £193, was formally accepted into the Institution as a branch, which then agreed to supply a lifeboat and carriage.

In August 1855, a 30-foot self-righting 'Pulling and Sailing (P&S) lifeboat, one with (10) oars and sails, was transported first to Haverfordwest, by the Great Western and South Wales railway companies, and then onto Fishguard.

A lifeboat house was constructed at the north-west end of Goodwick Sands, at a cost of £105.

A No.2 station was established at Fishguard in 1869. It was found that a larger 12-oared lifeboat was necessary for more distant services than the existing 6-oared No.1 lifeboat, which was retained for close shore work. A boathouse was constructed at Wig Wen cove, close to the site of the current station building. The cost of the lifeboat was defrayed by funds raised in the City of Worcester by Capt. F. Saumarez Fraser, RN, and on 30 August 1869, the lifeboat was paraded through the streets of Worcester, arriving at Pitchcroft, where it was named Fraser, before being launched on demonstration in the River Severn.

In May 1874 the RNLI awarded the Fishguard lifeboat No.1 crew £27 for their lifesaving services over the previous month; they included saving a total of 17 crew from the schooners J.T.S., Squirrel and Gem and the smack Lerry.

On 16 November 1882 the lifeboat attended 15 different vessels and saved 46 lives.

A slipway was built alongside the shore by the Great Western Railway in 1911 for a new boathouse; both were replaced in 1930. The lifeboat Charterhouse (ON563) was on station between 1909 and 1931, during which time her crews saved 47 lives. Her centenary was celebrated in 2009, still afloat and renamed Marian.

In February 1946, Fishguard lifeboat White Star (ON 710) was at sea for more than 24 hours in severe weather, standing by the broken-down submarine HMS Universal and helping to rescue her crew.

When the BBC TV children's programme Blue Peter launched their annual appeal in November 1993, the target was to raise enough money to replace the six Inshore lifeboats, at Beaumaris, Cleethorpes, Littlehampton, North Berwick, Portaferry and St Agnes. Such was the success of the "Pieces of Eight" appeal, which raised over £1.4 million, that for the first time, there was also enough money to fund an All-weather lifeboat.

The new Trent-class All-weather lifeboat arrived at Fishguard in 1994. On 17 June 1995, in front of a large crowd of onlookers, Blue Peter presenters Diane-Louise Jordan, Tim Vincent and Stuart Miles carried out the naming ceremony, with the boat being named 14-03 Blue Peter VII (ON 1198).

== Station honours ==
The following are awards made at Fishguard:
Twenty-eight medals have been awarded, 1 Gold, 18 Silver and 9 Bronze.

- RNLI Gold Medal
  John Howells, Coxswain – 1921
- RNIPLS Silver Medal
  Lt. Thomas Evans RN, Lloyd's agent, Fishguard – 1834
  Capt. Thomas Evans RN, Lloyd's agent, Fishguard – 1844 (Second-service award)
  John Acraman, Merchant – 1845
  John Evans, Master of the schooner Royal George – 1847
  William Jenkins – 1847
  Miss Martha Llewellyn – 1847
  Miss Margaret Llewellyn – 1847
  William Rees, Acting Master – 1849
- RNLI Silver Medal
  David Beddoe – 1861
  Albert Furlong – 1861
  James White, Coxswain – 1873
  James White, Coxswain – 1875 (Second-service clasp)
  James White, Coxswain – 1877 (Third-service clasp)
  James Thomas, Coxswain – 1899
  James Thomas, Coxswain Superintendent – 1906 (Second-service clasp)
  Thomas Oakley Davies, Second Coxswain – 1921
  Robert Edwin Simpson, Motor Mechanic – 1921
  Thomas Holmes, crewman – 1921
- RNLI Bronze Medal
  W. Devereux – 1921
  T. Duffin – 1921
  J. Gardiner – 1921
  H. M. Mason – 1921
  Thomas Perkins – 1921
  John Rourke – 1921
  William John Thomas – 1921
  R. Veal – 1921
  P. Whelan – 1921
- 'The Thanks of the Institution inscribed on Vellum'
  Capt. W. Harries – 1874
  W. Jenkins – 1874
  J.G. Annal – 1874
  Stephen Done, Helm – 2007
- 'A Framed Letter of Thanks signed by the Chairman of the Institution'
  Francis George, Coxswain – 1984
  Dr Joanne Boughton, crew member – 2007
  Robert Lanham, crew member – 2007
- Gold Watch, presented by The Queen of the Netherlands
  John Howells, Coxswain – 1921
- Silver Watch, presented by The Queen of the Netherlands
  each of the 12 members of the crew – 1921
- Member, Order of the British Empire (MBE)
  Morris Lyndon Nicholls, Honorary Secretary – 1950NYH
  Francis George, Coxswain – 2003NYH

== Roll of honour ==
In memory of those lost whilst serving at Fishguard:

- Died from the effects of exposure after service, 1866
  Charles Grinder, crew member
- Taken ill on service and died shortly afterwards, 10 December 1944
  Thomas Henry Neale (43)

== Fishguard lifeboats ==
=== Private lifeboat ===
Name	Built	On station	Class	Comments
Unnamed	1822	1822–1847	25-foot Lifeboat	(Note: 25-foot x 8-foot (10-oared) lifeboat, constructed by Lt. Thomas Evans RN, (later Captain), the Lloyd's agent for Fishguard.)

=== No.1 Station ===
ON (Note: ON is the RNLI's Official Number of the boat.)	Name	Built	On station	Class	Comments
Pre-293	Unnamed	1855	1855–1862	30-foot Peake self-righting (P&S)	(Note: 30-foot x 7-foot 6in (10-oared) Peake self-righting (P&S) lifeboat, built by Forrestt of Limehouse, London, costing £156.); Transferred to Blakeney.
Pre-340	Sir Edward Perrott	1859	1863–1885	30-foot Peake self-righting (P&S)	(Note: 30-foot x 6-foot 3in (6-oared) self-righting (P&S) lifeboat, built by Forrestt of Limehouse, London, costing £153.); Previously unnamed at Fleetwood. Broken up in 1887.
Pre-411	Sir Edward Perrott	1864	1885–1889	30-foot Peake self-righting (P&S)	(Note: 30-foot x 7-foot 3in (8-oared) self-righting (P&S) lifeboat, built by Forrestt of Limehouse, London, costing £215 when new.); Previously North Briton at Donna Nook. Sold in 1889.
252	Elizabeth Mary	1889	1889–1907	31-foot Self-righting (P&S)	(Note: 31-foot x 7-foot 3in (10-oared) self-righting (P&S) lifeboat, legacy of Mrs E. M. Tudor of Cheltenham, built by Forrestt of Limehouse, London, costing £310.); Sold in 1910.

No.1 Station closed in 1907
Pre ON numbers are unofficial numbers used by the Lifeboat Enthusiasts' Society to reference early lifeboats not included on the official RNLI list.

=== No.2 Station ===
==== Pulling and Sailing (P&S) lifeboats ====
ON	Name	Built	On station	Class	Comments
Pre-247	Fraser	1852	1869–1878	36-foot self-righting (P&S)	(Note: Twice modified 36 ft 0 in (10.97 m) x 8 ft 3 in (2.51 m) (12-oared) self-righting (P&S) lifeboat, previously 30-foot and 35-foot, funded by the City of Worcester LB fund via Capt. Saumarz Fraser, RN, built by James Beeching of Great Yarmouth, costing £130 when new.); Previously Prudhoe at Boulmer, and Thomas Chapman at Thorpeness and Newhaven. Renamed Helen of Foxley in 1878.
Pre-247	Helen of Foxley	1852	1878–1885	36-foot self-righting (P&S)	(Note: Legacy of Miss H. H. Harrison of Bath); Broken up in 1885.
60	Appin	1885	1885–1906	37-foot self-righting (P&S)	(Note: 37 ft 0 in (11.28 m) x 8 ft 0 in (2.44 m) (12-oared) self-righting (P&S) lifeboat, legacy of Miss Downie of Appin, built by Woolfe of Shadwell, London, costing £390.); Broken up in 1906.
295	Reserve No. 6A	1890	1906–1909	37-foot self-righting (P&S)	(Note: 37 ft 0 in (11.28 m) x 8 ft 0 in (2.44 m) (10/12-oared) self-righting (P&S) lifeboat, built by Watkins of Blackwall, London, costing £545 when new.); Previously T. P. Hearne at Ballycotton and Joseph Denman at Penarth. Broken up in 1910.

=== Motor lifeboats ===
ON	Op. No. (Note: Op. No. is the RNLI's Operational Number of the boat carried on the hull.)	Name	Built	On station	Class	Comments
563	–	Charterhouse	1908	1909–1931	40-foot self-righting (motor)	(Note: 40 ft 0 in (12.19 m) x 10 ft 6 in (3.20 m) self-righting (motor) lifeboat, with a single 24-hp Tylor engine, built by Thames Ironworks of Blackwall, London, costing £2,949.); Sold in 1931. Renamed Marian. Under restoration and display as Charterhouse at the West Wales Maritime and Heritage Society, Pembroke, December 2025
710	–	White Star	1930	1931–1956	45-foot 6in Watson	
932	–	Howard Marryat	1957	1956–1981	46-foot 9in Watson	
1076	52-19	Marie Winstone	1981	1981–1994	Arun	
1198	14-03	Blue Peter VII	1994	1994–	Trent	

More post-service details can be found on the respective lifeboat class pages.

=== Inshore lifeboats ===
Op. No.	Name	On station	Class	Comments
D-415	Pride of West Kingsdown	1995	D-class (EA16)	
D-505	Arthur Bygraves	1995–2006	D-class (EA16)	
D-652	Team Effort	2006–2015	D-class (IB1)	
D-789	Edward Arthur Richardson	2016–	D-class (IB1)	

== See also ==
- List of RNLI stations
- List of former RNLI stations
- Royal National Lifeboat Institution lifeboats
