= Penmon Lifeboat Station =

Former lifeboat station in Anglesey, Wales

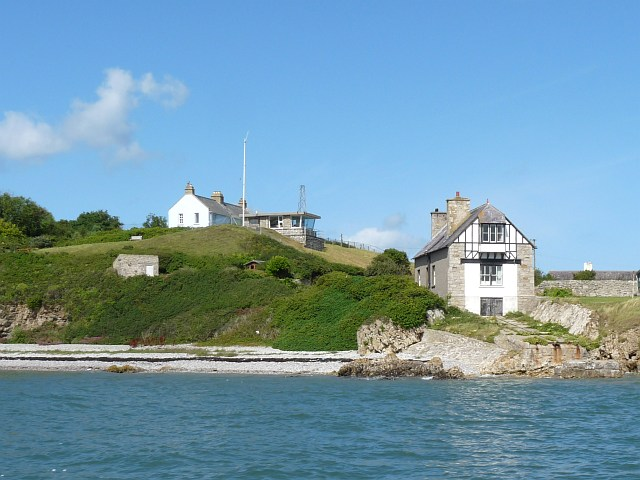
- Penmon Old Lifeboat Station

- Penmon, Anglesey

General information
- Status: Closed
- Type: RNLI Lifeboat Station
- Location: Penmon Point, Penmon, Beaumaris, Anglesey, LL58 8RP, Wales
- Coordinates: 53°18′34.0″N 4°02′29.4″W
- Opened: 1831
- Closed: 1915

Penmon Lifeboat Station was located at Penmon Point, north east of the town of Beaumaris, on the eastern tip of the Isle of Anglesey, Wales.

A lifeboat was first stationed at Penmon by the Royal National Institution for the Preservation of Life from Shipwreck (RNIPLS) in 1831, managed by the Anglesey Association for the Preservation of Life from Shipwreck (AAPLS). The station was transferred to the management of the Royal National Lifeboat Institution (RNLI) in 1855.

Penmon Lifeboat Station closed in 1915, after a motor-powered lifeboat was placed at Beaumaris.

== History ==
In 1828, the Anglesey Association for the Preservation of Life from Shipwreck (AAPLS) was founded by the Rev. James Williams and Mrs Frances Williams, of Llanfair-yng-Nghornwy, Anglesey. On 26 March 1823, they had witnessed the loss of 140 lives from the wreck of the vessel Alert, and spent the following five years raising funds and gaining support for a lifeboat service.

In 1830, the Anglesey Association wrote to the RNIPLS requesting their help to place a lifeboat at Penmon. A 26-foot 6-oared non-self-righting 'Palmer' type lifeboat was built by Harton of Limehouse, and transported by sea via Kingstown (Dún Laoghaire), to Holyhead, arriving at Penmon on 28 January 1831. Landowner Sir Richard Williams-Bulkeley, 10th Baronet provided a site, and constructed a 32-foot x 10-foot stone-built boathouse at the sound between Anglesey and Puffin Island, with doors at both ends, for launching into the sea, or for transporting the lifeboat to alternate launch sites. In 18 years, the first Penmon boat would launch eight times, and rescue 27 people.

The 1830 Penmon lifeboat was transferred to the new lifeboat station at Moelfre in 1848, and a new 26-foot boat was provided to Penmon. Only one service call is recorded, with no lives saved, but on 29 March 1850, over 35 vessels were driven ashore by the conditions at Penmon, and the lifeboat-men spent many hours helping vessels and crew.

In 1854, the RNIPLS changed its name to become the Royal National Lifeboat Institution, and in 1855, all six lifeboat stations of the AAPLS, Cemlyn (no.1), Holyhead (no.2), Rhoscolyn (no.3), Penmon (no.4), Llanddwyn (no.5) and Moelfre (no.6), were transferred over to the management of the RNLI.

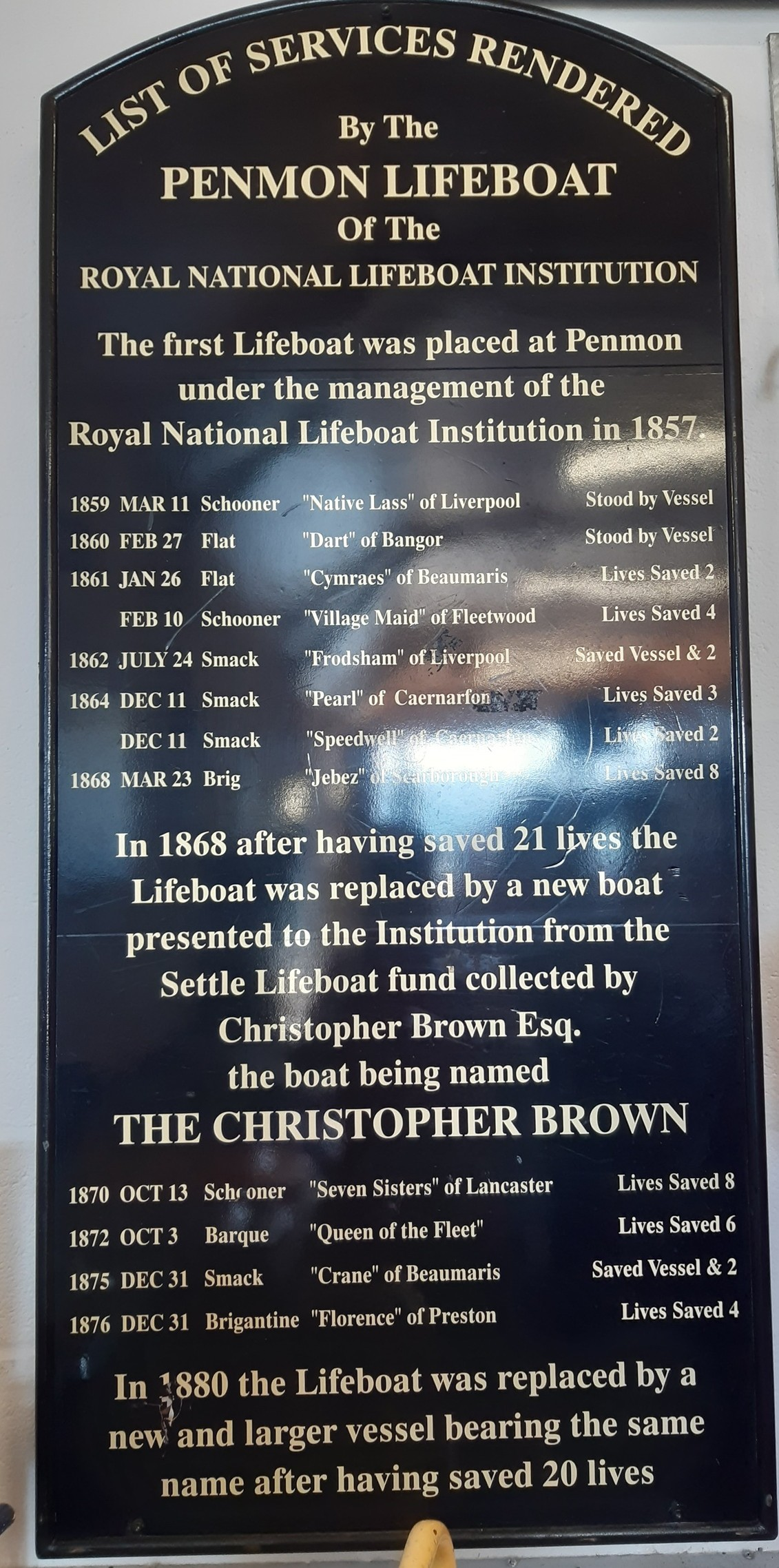
Penmon Lifeboat Service Board on display at Beaumaris

Soon afterwards, Capt. John Ward, RNLI Inspector of Lifeboats, visited Penmon, and when launching with the crew on exercise, found that the lifeboat was "too light". A replacement 28-foot 6-oar lifeboat costing £126 was ordered from Forrestt of Limehouse, London. She was a self-righting lifeboat, which would prove invaluable some years later. Called to the aid of the Jabez of Scarborough on the 23 March 1868, and with 5 rescued persons aboard, the lifeboat capsized. After self-righting, everyone managed to get back on board. However, the incident prompted calls for a larger boat.

Costing £251, a 30-foot 10-oared self-righting boat was provided to Penmon in 1868, again built by Forrestt. The lifeboat was funded by the Settle, North Yorkshire branch of the RNLI, the boat being named Christopher Brown, after their primary fundraiser.

A new boathouse was constructed in 1880 to house a new 34-foot lifeboat, again funded by the Settle branch of the RNLI, and again named Christopher Brown (ON 266). The lifeboat ended up being moored afloat for two years during the reconstruction of the slipway, which had been washed away during a storm.

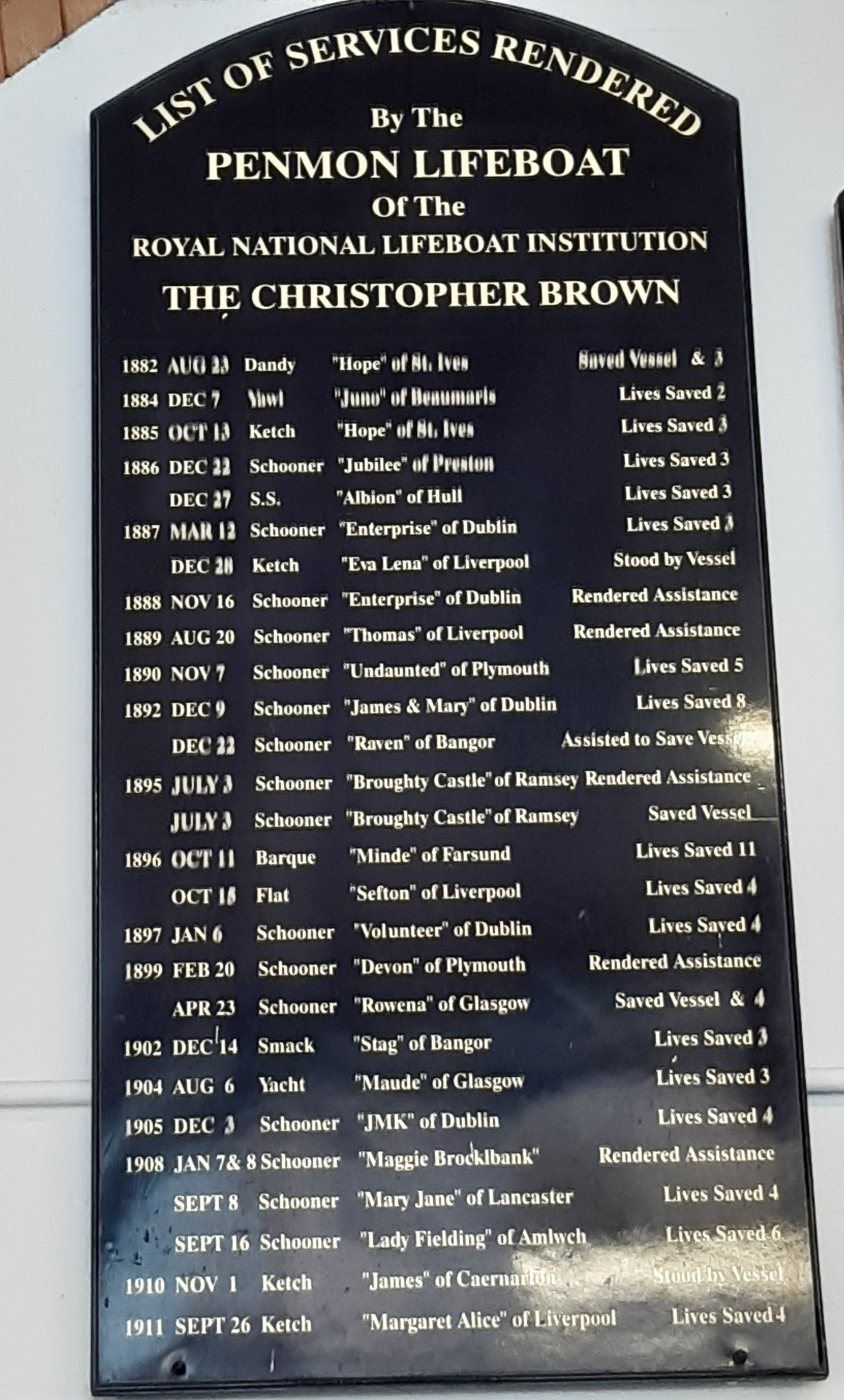
Penmon Lifeboat Service Board on display at Beaumaris

A flanking lifeboat station had been established at Beaumaris in 1891, but was closed just five years later in 1896, after a larger 37-foot lifeboat was placed at Penmon in 1895. However, in 1910, it was decided to place a motor-powered lifeboat on that part of the coast, and a new site at Beaumaris was chosen. Following construction of a new boathouse and deep-water roller-slipway, to house the new motor-lifeboat, Frederick Kitchen (ON 621), Beaumaris lifeboat station was reopened in 1914.

Now surplus to requirements, Penmon Lifeboat Station was closed on 31 March 1915. The lifeboat on station at the time, Christopher Brown (ON 390), was withdrawn and sold.

The boathouse was handed back to the landowner, Sir Richard Williams-Bulkeley, 12th Baronet, the grandson of the original landowner. The building still stands, and is available as a Holiday Let.

== Station honours ==
The following are awards made at Penmon

- RNIPLS Silver Medal

Owen Roberts, Pilot – 1838

- RNLI Silver Medal

Thomas Price, Fisherman – 1854

William M. Preston, Honorary Secretary – 1890
Robert Roberts, Coxswain – 1890

William M. Preston, Honorary Secretary – 1893 (Second-Service clasp)
Robert Roberts, Coxswain – 1893 (Second-Service clasp)

William Pritchard, Coxswain Superintendent – 1909
James Hartley Burton, Honorary Secretary – 1909

William Pritchard, Coxswain Superintendent – 1910 (Second-Service clasp)

- The Thanks of the Institution inscribed on Vellum

William M. Preston, Honorary Secretary – 1878

== Penmon lifeboats ==
ON (Note: ON is the RNLI's Official Number of the boat.)	Name	Built	On Station	Class	Comments
Pre-151	Unnamed	1830	1831–1848	26-foot Palmer	(Note: 26-foot x 6-foot (6-oared) Palmer-class non-self-righting lifeboat, provided by the AAPLS, built by Harton of Limehouse, London, costing £60.)
Pre-224	Unnamed	1846	1848–1857	26-foot Palmer	(Note: 26-foot x 6-foot (6-oared) Palmer-type non-self-righting lifeboat, provided by the AAPLS, built by Costain of Liverpool, costing £78.)
Pre-316	Unnamed	1857	1857–1868	28-foot Peake Self-righting (P&S)	(Note: 28-foot x 6-foot (6-oared) Peake-class self-righting (P&S) lifeboat, from RNLI funds, built by Forrestt of Limehouse, London, costing £126.)
Pre-520	Christopher Brown	1868	1868–1880	30-foot Self-righting (P&S)	(Note: 30-foot x 7-foot 7in (10-oared) self-righting (P&S) lifeboat, gift of the Settle LB fund via Christopher Brown, built by Forrestt of Limehouse, London, costing £251.)
266	Christopher Brown	1879	1880–1896	34-foot Self-righting (P&S)	(Note: 34-foot x 8-foot (10-oared) self-righting (P&S) lifeboat, gift of the Settle LB fund, built by Woolfe of Shadwell, London, costing £363.)
390	Christopher Brown	1895	1896–1915	37-foot Self-righting (P&S)	(Note: 37-foot x 9-foot 3in (12-oared) self-righting (P&S) lifeboat, gift of the Settle LB fund, built by Hansen & Sons of East Cowes, costing £514.)

Pre ON numbers are unofficial numbers used by the Lifeboat Enthusiast Society to reference early lifeboats not included on the official RNLI list.

== See also ==
- List of RNLI stations
- List of former RNLI stations
- Royal National Lifeboat Institution lifeboats
