= Blue Peter lifeboats =

British and Irish rescue lifeboats

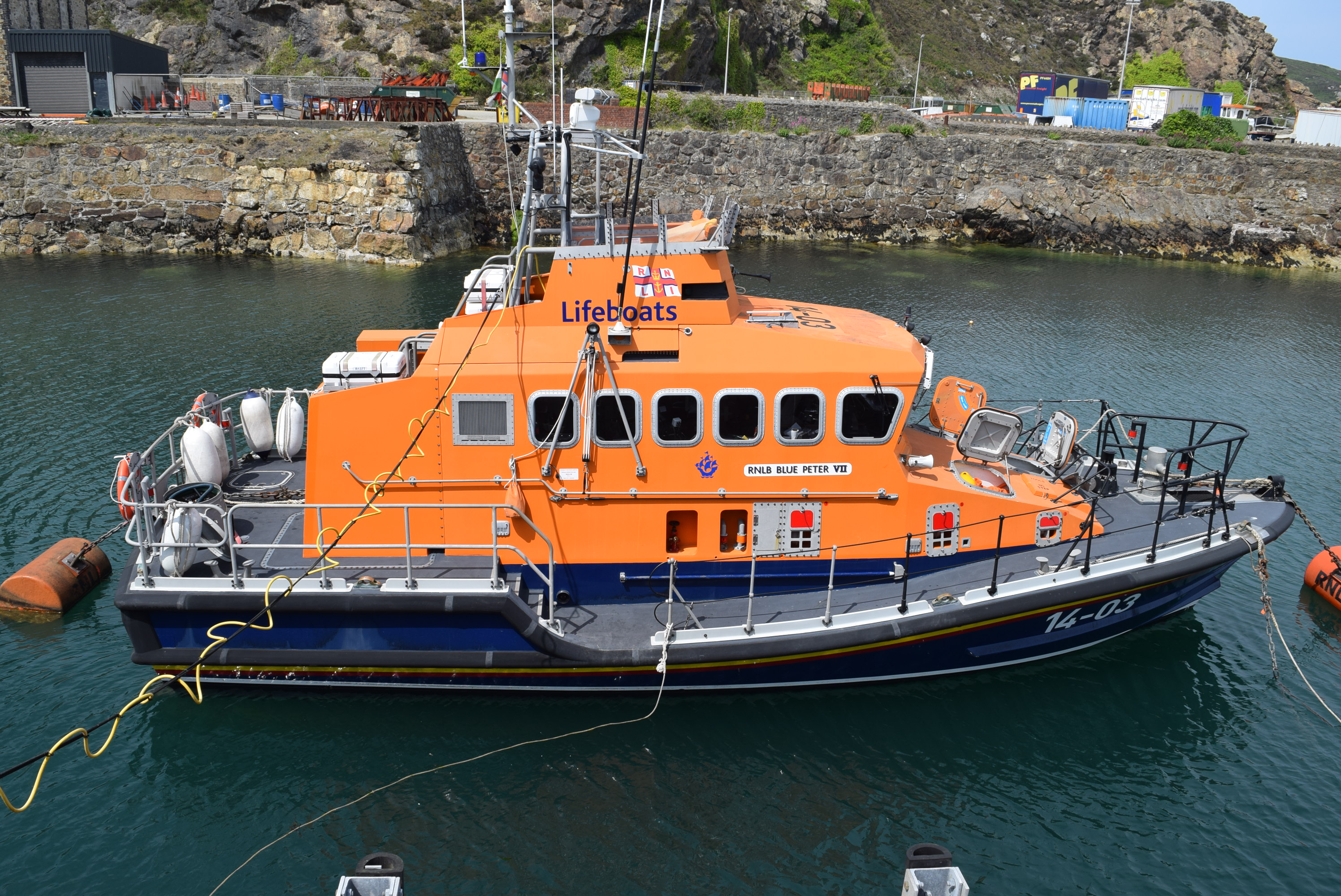
- Blue Peter VII at Fishguard Lifeboat Station

Blue Peter lifeboats are a series of lifeboats, provided to the Royal National Lifeboat Institution (RNLI), which were funded by some of the annual appeals held by the BBC TV children's programme Blue Peter.

An appeal in 1966 provided four D-class (RFD PB16) inshore lifeboats, which went into service in 1967 and 1968.

Three further appeals resulted in D-class and B-class lifeboats being placed at six stations, a Trent-class All-weather lifeboat being placed at Fishguard, and one D-class Inshore lifeboat being retained in the relief fleet; the latter being transferred to various stations as operations and maintenance required.

A total of 28 lifeboats have been funded by the various Blue Peter appeals, and have served at the following stations; the name of the lifeboat remaining with the station, even when the lifeboat was replaced.

- Blue Peter I – Littlehampton
- Blue Peter II – Beaumaris
- Blue Peter III – North Berwick
- Blue Peter IV – St Agnes
- Blue Peter V – Portaferry
- Blue Peter VI – Cleethorpes
- Blue Peter VII – Fishguard

As of March 2026, just two Blue Peter lifeboats remain on service:

- B-class (Atlantic 85) Inshore lifeboat Blue Peter V (B-833) at Portaferry
- Trent-class All-weather lifeboat 14-03 Blue Peter VII (ON 1198) at Fishguard.

== History ==
One of the annual features of the BBC TV children's programme Blue Peter was a fundraising appeal. Rather than asking for money, programme editor Biddy Baxter MBE decided to make it possible for even the poorest children to be able to contribute. The first appeal was held in 1962, when viewers were asked to collect postage stamps, to raise money for homes for the homeless.

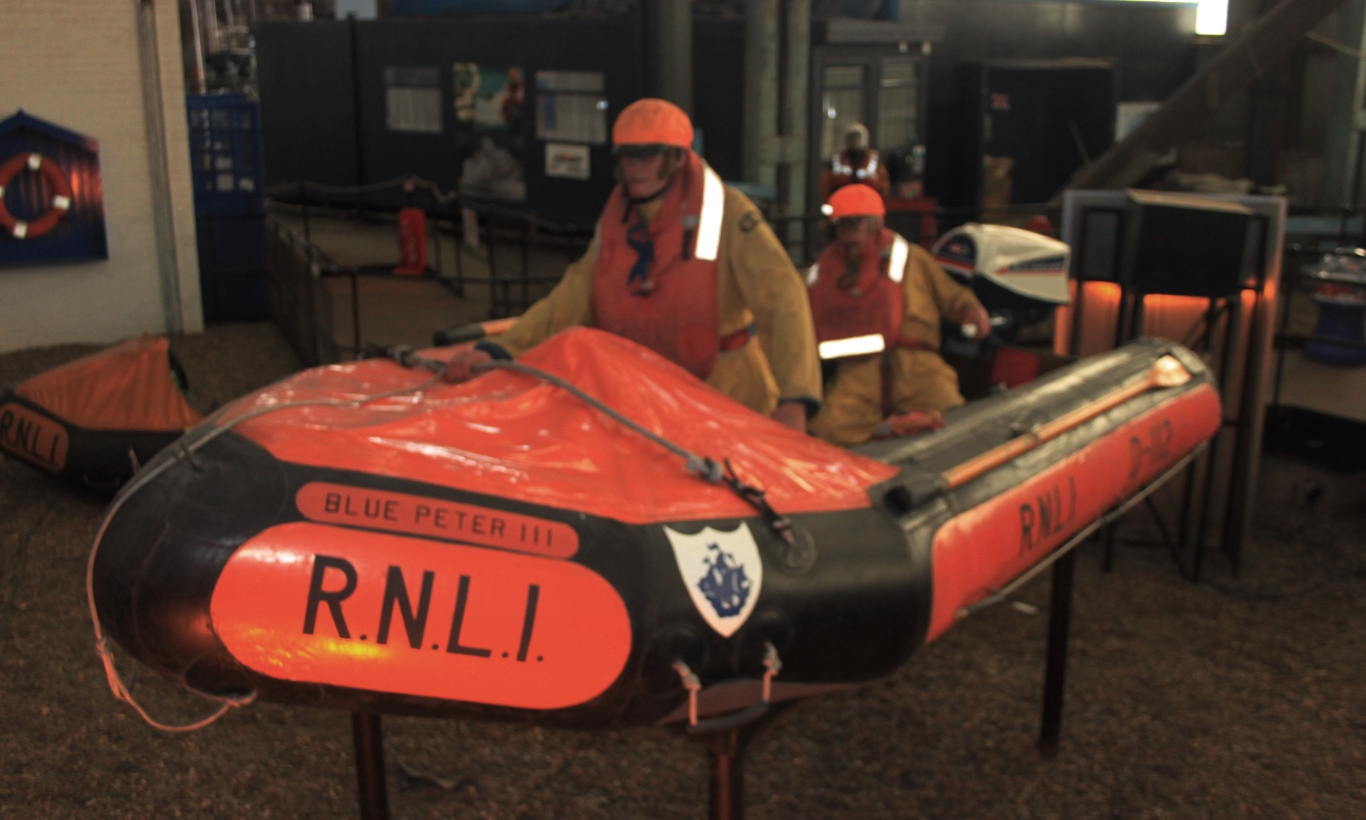
North Berwick Blue Peter III (D-112) (1967–1973), on display in the RNLI Heritage Collection at Chatham Historic Dockyard.

In 1964, in response to an increasing amount of water-based leisure activity, the RNLI placed 25 small fast Inshore lifeboats around the country. These were easily launched with just a few people, ideal to respond quickly to local emergencies.

The target of the 1966 Blue Peter appeal was the donation of 60,000 paperback books, the sale of which would fund one new Inshore lifeboat for the RNLI. At the end of the appeal, 250,000 paperback books had been sent in. Instead of just one lifeboat, four new lifeboats were provided. Three former lifeboat stations, at Littlehampton, North Berwick, and Beaumaris, were re-established, and a Blue Peter lifeboat placed there on service in 1967. A completely new station opened at St Agnes in 1968.

On 8 June 1972, a second appeal was made, to provide replacement lifeboats for the four Inshore lifeboats. Paperback books were once again requested for the appeal.

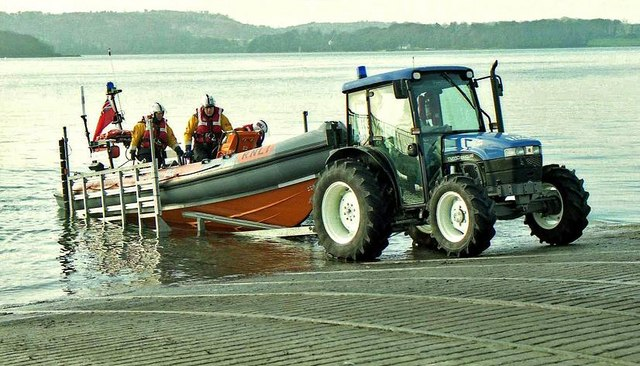
Portaferry B-class (Atlantic 75) Blue Peter V (B-706) in 2006

Blue Peter held a "Double Lifesaver" appeal in 1984, when viewers were requested to send in stamps, buttons and postcards. The money raised went to fund water tanks and pumps in Ethiopia, along with another set of Inshore lifeboats. Enough funds were raised that a fifth boat was provided to Portaferry in Northern Ireland, and a D-class (Zodiac III) Inshore lifeboat Blue Peter VI (D-340) was later added to the relief fleet, which might be sent to any station, to cover for maintenance and repairs.

When Blue Peter launched their annual appeal in November 1993, the target was to raise enough money to replace six Inshore lifeboats, at Littlehampton, Beaumaris, North Berwick, St Agnes, Portaferry and Cleethorpes. Such was the enormous success of the "Pieces of Eight" appeal, which raised over £1.4 million, that for the first time, there was also enough money to fund an All-weather lifeboat.

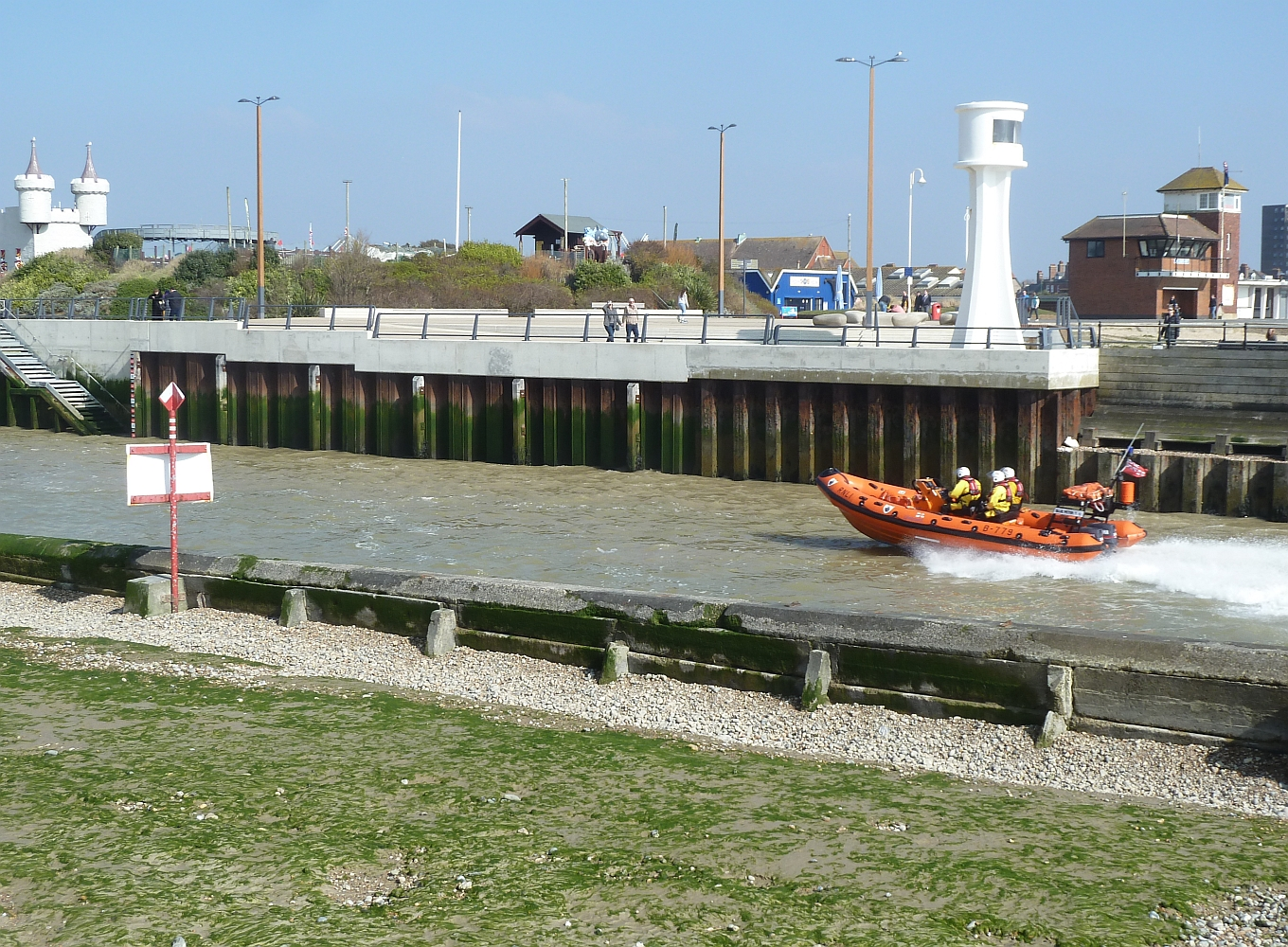
Littlehampton Blue Peter I (B-779) in 2016

Cleethorpes would become the sixth station to receive a Blue Peter lifeboat. On 22 February 1994, the seven-year-old Inshore lifeboat Tricentrol II (D-325) was withdrawn, and replaced by Blue Peter VI (D-454). A naming ceremony was held on 16 July 1994, with the lifeboat being handed over to Cleethorpes lifeboat station by Blue Peter presenter Anthea Turner, followed by a fly-past of the Air-Sea rescue helicopter from RAF Leconfield.

The new Trent-class All-weather lifeboat arrived at Fishguard in 1994. On 17 June 1995, in front of a large crowd of onlookers, Blue Peter presenters Diane-Louise Jordan, Tim Vincent and Stuart Miles carried out the naming ceremony, with the boat being named 14-03 Blue Peter VII (ON 1198).

The last appeal, "Pieces of Eight", was held in 1993. The funds raised continued to provide lifeboats until a final B-class (Atlantic 85) was stationed at Portaferry in 2009.

== Station honours ==
The following are awards made to Blue Peter lifeboat crew.

- RNLI Silver Medal

Peter David Bliss, Helm, St Agnes – 1978
Gary Barlow, Helm, Cleethorpes – 2004
Gavin Forehead, Helm, St Agnes – 2005

- RNLI Bronze Medal

Benjamin Pearson, Helm, North Berwick – 1973
Alexander Russell, crew member, North Berwick – 1973
David Gallichan, Coxswain, Beaumaris – 1982
John Desmond Rogers, Helm, Portaferry – 1983
David L. Steenvoorden, Helm, Cleethorpes – 1990
Ian Sanderson, Helm, Cleethorpes – 2004
Shaun Sonley, crew member, Cleethorpes – 2004
Tony Salters, crew member, Cleethorpes – 2004

- The Thanks of the Institution inscribed on Vellum

C. R. Cole, crew member, Littlehampton – 1970
C. J. Pelham, crew member, Littlehampton – 1970
James Pearson, crew member, North Berwick – 1973
John Charles Askew, Helm, Beaumaris – 1976
David Jones, Helm, Beaumaris – 1978
David William Woollven, Helm, Littlehampton – 1982
William Ellison, crew member, Portaferry – 1983
Francis Rogers, crew member, Portaferry – 1983
Steven A. Burton, crew member, Cleethorpes – 1990
Martin J. Kennedy, crew member, Cleethorpes – 1990
Peter Roberts, crew member, St Agnes – 1996
Andrew Northcote, Helm, St Agnes – 2002
Rory Bushe, crew member, St Agnes – 2005
James Watkins, crew member, St Agnes – 2005
Simon Rogers, Helm, Portaferry – 2006
Stephen Done, Helm, Fishguard – 2007

- Vellum Service Certificates

John Askew, crew member, Beaumaris – 1978
Simon Dubberley, crew member, Beaumaris – 1978
Dr Jack Dubberley, crew member, Beaumaris – 1978

- The Ralph Glister Award 1989
  (for the most meritorious service of the year performed by a rescue boat crew)

David L. Steenvoorden, Helm, Cleethorpes – 1990
Steven A. Burton, crew member, Cleethorpes – 1990
Martin J. Kennedy, crew member, Cleethorpes – 1990

- The Walter and Elizabeth Groombridge Award 2006
  (for the outstanding inshore lifeboat rescue of the year)

Simon Rogers, Helm, Portaferry – 2006
Sinead Breen, Portaferry – 2006
Philip Sands-Robinson, Portaferry – 2006
Andrew Edwards, Portaferry – 2006

- A Framed Letter of Thanks signed by the Chairman of the Institution

Francis George, Coxswain, Fishguard – 1984
Gary Barlow, crew member, Cleethorpes – 1996
Shane Johnson, crew member, Cleethorpes – 1997
Martin Broughton, crew member, Beaumaris – 1998
Rory Bushe, crew members, St Agnes – 2002
Carey Morgan, crew members, St Agnes – 2002
Dr Joanne Boughton, crew member, Fishguard – 2007
Robert Lanham, crew member, Fishguard – 2007

- Royal Humane Society Certificate of Commendation

Peter David Bliss, Helm, St Agnes – 1983

- James Michael Bower Endowment Fund award

Gary Barlow, Helm, Cleethorpes – 2004
Gavin Forehead, Helm, St Agnes – 2005

- The Daily Express LifeSavers Award from Vodafone 2005

Gavin Forehead, Helm, St Agnes – 2005
Rory Bushe, crew member, St Agnes – 2005
James Watkins, crew member, St Agnes – 2005

- A Collective Letter of Thanks signed by the Chairman of the Institution

David L. Steenvoorden, Helm, Cleethorpes – 1990
N. Holroyd, Tractor Driver, Cleethorpes – 1990
T. Smith, Launcher, Cleethorpes – 1990
D. W. Richardson, crew member, Cleethorpes – 1990
M. A. Sweeney, crew member, Cleethorpes – 1990
M. J. Kennedy, crew member, Cleethorpes – 1990
M. N. Fowler, crew member, Cleethorpes – 1990
S. A. Burton, crew member, Cleethorpes – 1990
W. J. Barlow, crew member, Cleethorpes – 1990

== Blue Peter lifeboat fleet ==
=== Littlehampton ===
Op.No. (Note: Op.No. is the RNLI's Operational Number of the boat carried on the hull.)	Name	On station	Class	Comments
D-115	Blue Peter I	1967–1972	D-class (RFD PB16)	Now part of the Science Museum Collection (in storage), Wroughton, Wiltshire
B-504	Blue Peter I	1972–1973	B-class (Atlantic 21)	
B-517	Blue Peter I	1973–1974	B-class (Atlantic 21)	
B-523	Blue Peter I	1974–1985	B-class (Atlantic 21)	
B-564	Blue Peter I	1985–2001	B-class (Atlantic 21)	
B-779	Blue Peter I	2002–2016	B-class (Atlantic 75)	Later served in the RNLI Relief and Training fleets.

=== Beaumaris ===
Op.No.	Name	On station	Class	Comments
D-127	Blue Peter II	1967–1976	D-class (RFD PB16)	For many years following retirement, on display at Flambards Theme Park, Cornwall, (now closed). Re-sold in August 2025.
B-515	Blue Peter II	1976–1985	B-class (Atlantic 21)	
B-563	Blue Peter II	1985–2000	B-class (Atlantic 21)	
B-768	Blue Peter II	2000–2010	B-class (Atlantic 75)	At Burry Port 2010–2011

=== North Berwick ===
Op.No.	Name	On station	Class	Comments
D-112	Blue Peter III	1967–1973	D-class (RFD PB16)	On display in the RNLI Heritage Collection at Chatham Historic Dockyard
D-216	Blue Peter III	1973–1984	D-class (RFD PB16)	
D-306	Blue Peter III	1984–1993	D-class (RFD PB16)	
D-452	Blue Peter III	1993–2003	D-class (EA16)	
D-619	Blue Peter III	2004–2013	D-class (IB1)	

=== St Agnes ===
Op.No.	Name	On Station	Type	Comments
D-148	Blue Peter IV	1968–1972	D-class (RFD PB16)	
D-215	Blue Peter IV	1973–1981	D-class (RFD PB16)	
D-179	Blue Peter IV	1981–1984	D-class (RFD PB16)	
D-305	Blue Peter IV	1985–1993	D-class (RFD PB16)	
D-453	Blue Peter IV	1994–2004	D-class (EA16)	
D-641	Blue Peter IV	2005–2015	D-class (IB1)	

=== Portaferry ===
Op.No.	Name	On Station	Class	Comments
B-569	Blue Peter V	1986–1994	B-class (Atlantic 21)	
B-706	Blue Peter V	1994–2009	B-class (Atlantic 75)	
B-833	Blue Peter V	2009–	B-class (Atlantic 85)	

=== Relief fleet ===
Op.No.	Name	On station	Class	Comments
D-340	Blue Peter VI	1987–1994	D-class (Zodiac III)	

=== Cleethorpes ===
Op.No.	Name	On station	Class	Comments
D-454	Blue Peter VI	1994–2004	D-class (EA16)	
D-618	Blue Peter VI	2004–2012	D-class (IB1)	

=== Fishguard ===
ON (Note: ON is the RNLI's Official Number of the boat.)	Op.No.	Name	On station	Class	Comments
1198	14-03	Blue Peter VII	1994–	Trent	

== See also ==
- List of RNLI stations
- List of former RNLI stations
- Royal National Lifeboat Institution lifeboats
