= St Agnes Lifeboat Station =

RNLI lifeboat station in Cornwall, England

- Flag of the RNLI

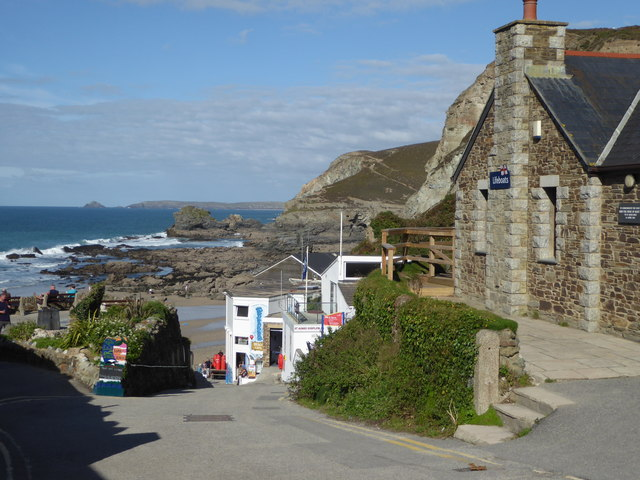
- St Agnes Lifeboat Station

- Location within Cornwall

General information
- Type: Lifeboat Station
- Location: Trevaunance Cove,, Quay Road, St Agnes, Cornwall, TR5 0RY, United Kingdom
- Coordinates: 50°19′9″N 5°12′6″W
- Opened: 1968
- Owner: Royal National Lifeboat Institution

Website
- St Agnes RNLI Lifeboat Station

St Agnes Lifeboat Station can be found off Quay Road at Trevaunance Cove in St Agnes, a coastal village approximately 9 miles (14 km) north-west of the cathedral city of Truro, on the north-west coast of the county of Cornwall, England.

A lifeboat station was established at St Agnes by the Royal National Lifeboat Institution (RNLI) in 1968. Until 2015, the station's lifeboats were provided by the fundraising appeals from the BBC TV childrens programme Blue Peter.

The station currently operates a D-class (IB1) Inshore lifeboat, XKalibur (D-787), on station since 2015.

== History ==
In 1964, in response to an increasing amount of water-based leisure activity, the RNLI placed 25 small fast Inshore lifeboats around the country. These were easily launched with just a few people, ideal to respond quickly to local emergencies.

More stations were gradually opened, and in 1966, an appeal for 60,000 paperback books was made by the BBC TV Children's programme Blue Peter, the sale of which would fund one new Inshore lifeboat for the RNLI. At the end of the appeal, 250,000 paperback books had been sent in. Instead of just one lifeboat, four new Blue Peter lifeboats were provided.

Three former lifeboat stations, at Littlehampton, North Berwick, and Beaumaris, were re-established, and each received a Blue Peter lifeboat, placed there on service in 1967. A fourth completely new station was established at St Agnes, and opened in 1968.

A small boathouse was provided on the lane down to Trevaunace Cove. Higher up the lane, a house was converted for crew facilities in 2004, with a small fundraising shop sited alongside.

Blue Peter funding continued over the years, and since the station opened in 1968, four different appeals have resulted in six different lifeboats being placed at the station, all bearing the name Blue Peter IV. The last, Blue Peter IV (D-641) was placed on station in 2005, operating for 10 years. In 2015, a new lifeboat was funded by the Jaguar Enthusiasts' Club. The funds were raised through a raffle for a Jaguar XK, and the name of the lifeboat XKalibur was a reference to the sword of Cornish legend King Arthur, with a twist including 'XK'.

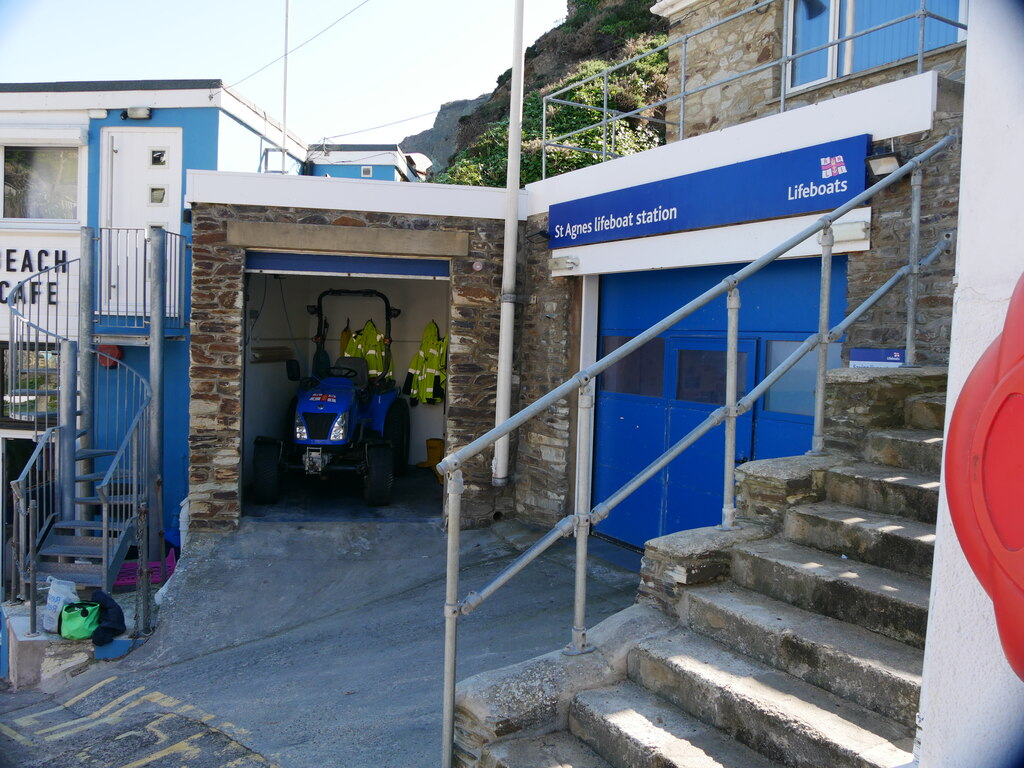
St Agnes boat and tractor houses

The Duke of Kent visited the station in 1978, in his role as president of the RNLI, and presented awards to two crew members.

In 2022, Martyn Ward was recognised for his charity work, and his contribution to the RNLI, and was awarded the MBE in the 2022 New Year Honours. Since joining in the late 1960s, he has trained over 200 people at St Agnes Surf Life Saving Club. His first job was as a lifeguard with Carrick District Council Lifeguard Service, becoming supervisor when the RNLI took over in 2002. As deputy launch authority with the RNLI since 2006, he was responsible for decisions to launch the lifeboat, and from 2015, he also took on the role of Water Safety Officer, to educate about the dangers of the sea.

== Notable rescues ==
On the afternoon of 17 July 1977, a surf-boarder was swept into the sheer sided Flat Rocks cove, and after hitting the rocks, landed on the shingle beach. Attempting to climb to safety, the man fell and broke his wrist. The St Agnes Inshore lifeboat Blue Peter (D-215) was launched at 16:30, heading to the location at top speed. Despite being continuously swamped with breaking surf, the lifeboat was taken with great skill through the rocks. In a service lasting over two hours, the man was recovered, in conditions described by onlookers as "impossible", and landed at Porthtowan beach. Helm David Bliss was awarded the RNLI Silver Medal. It was the first of 11 medals for gallantry awarded to crew members of Blue Peter lifeboats. The lifeboat crew, David Bliss, Roger Radcliffe and Barry Garland, were later featured with presenters John Noakes and Lesley Judd on an episode of the TV programme.

Just setting out on exercise with three regular crew, and two trainees, the lifeboat was tasked at 14:05, to an incident at Chapel Porth. The two trainees were swiftly dropped off, and the lifeboat headed out at top speed. A strong rip-tide had washed two surfers, a man and a 12-year-old girl, into Horseshoe Cave, and they were now clinging to the rocks, while being battered by the 2 m (6 ft 7 in) waves. On arrival on scene, the helm took a moment to assess the situation, while two other surfers swam into the cave to assist the casualties. Then, timing the run between wave sets, the boat was expertly handled into the cave, and soon brought out the man and girl. With a quick check on the other two surfers, the lifeboat headed to Chapel Porth beach, although it took all the skill of the helm to stop them being capsized. The two casualties were passed to the care of HM Coastguard at 14:40, and were airlifted to hospital by helicopter. Helm Gary Forehead was awarded the RNLI silver medal "in recognition of his excellent decision making, dynamic risk assessment, outstanding boat handling and overall command", with crew members and the two surfers who assisted all being accorded 'The Thanks of the Institution inscribed on Vellum'.

== Station honours ==
The following are awards made at St Agnes:

- RNLI Silver Medal
  Peter David Bliss, Helm – 1978
  Gavin Forehead, Helm – 2005
- Medal Service Certificates
  Roger Radcliffe, crew member – 1978
  Barry Garland, crew member – 1978
- The Thanks of the Institution inscribed on Vellum
  Peter Roberts, crew member – 1996
  Andrew Northcote, Helm – 2002
  Rory Bushe, crew member – 2005
  James Watkins, crew member – 2005
  Tom Roberson, surfer – 2005
  Jamie Kent, surfer – 2005
- A Framed Letter of Thanks, signed by the chairman of the Institution
  Rory Bushe, crew members – 2002
  Carey Morgan, crew members – 2002
- Certificate of Commendation, awarded by the Royal Humane Society
  Peter David Bliss, Helm – 1983
- The Daily Express LifeSavers Award from Vodafone
  Gavin Forehead, Helm – 2005
  Rory Bushe, crew member – 2005
  James Watkins, crew member – 2005
- James Michael Bower Endowment Fund Award
  Gavin Forehead, Helm – 2005
- Member, Order of the British Empire (MBE)
  Martyn Leander Storme Ward, Lifeguard Supervisor – 2022NYH, for services to the RNLI and to Charity.

== St Agnes lifeboats ==
On station	Op.No. (Note: Op.No. is the RNLI's Operational Number of the boat carried on the hull.)	Name	Class	Comments
1968–1972	D-148	Blue Peter IV	D-class (RFD PB16)	
1973–1981	D-215	Blue Peter IV	D-class (RFD PB16)	
1981–1984	D-179	Blue Peter IV	D-class (RFD PB16)	First stationed at Great Yarmouth and Gorleston. Unnamed until allocated to St Agnes.
1985–1993	D-305	Blue Peter IV	D-class (RFD PB16)	
1994–2004	D-453	Blue Peter IV	D-class (EA16)	
2005–2015	D-641	Blue Peter IV	D-class (IB1)	
2015–	D-787	XKalibur	D-class (IB1)	Funded by The Jaguar Enthusiasts' Club and named after King Arthur's sword, Excalibur.

=== Launch and recovery tractors ===
On station	Op.No.	Reg. No.	Type	Comments
1993–2001	TA18	L191 AOD	Ford 1720	
2001–2012	TA49	V787 KAF	New Holland	
2012–2014	TT11	WA61 HZL	Tooltrak	
2014–	TA96	SF59 FUB	New Holland TC35	

== See also ==
- List of RNLI stations
- List of former RNLI stations
- Royal National Lifeboat Institution lifeboats
