= Portaferry Lifeboat Station =

RNLI lifeboat station in County Down, Northern Ireland

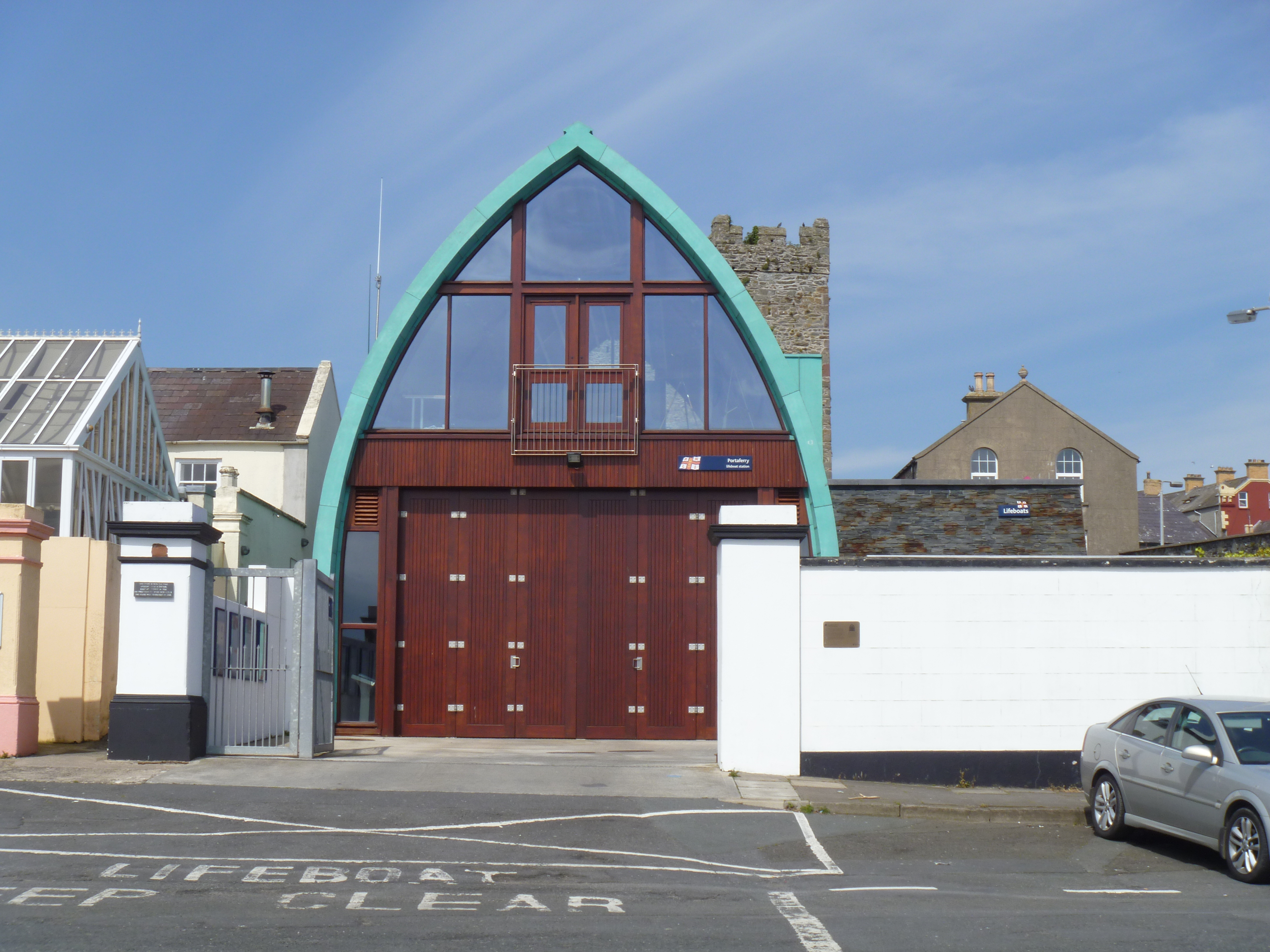
- Portaferry Lifeboat Station

- Location within Northern Ireland

General information
- Type: RNLI Lifeboat Station
- Location: The Strand, Portaferry, County Down, BT22 1PF, Northern Ireland
- Coordinates: 54°22′51.8″N 5°32′57.7″W
- Opened: 1 May 1980
- Owner: Royal National Lifeboat Institution

Website
- Portaferry RNLI Lifeboat Station

Portaferry Lifeboat Station is located directly opposite the slipway for the Portaferry–Strangford ferry on The Strand, in Portaferry, a town located at the southern end of the Ards Peninsula, at the entrance to Strangford Lough, in County Down, Northern Ireland.

A lifeboat was first stationed at Portaferry in 1980 by the Royal National Lifeboat Institution (RNLI).

The station currently operates the B-class (Atlantic 85) Inshore lifeboat, Blue Peter V (B-833), on station since 2009.

== History ==
In the 1970s, concerns were raised about the lack of lifeboat coverage for Strangford Lough. Strangford Lough is the largest sea inlet in the British Isles, and covers an area of 150 km^{2} (58 sq mi). Lifeboats based at Newcastle and Cloughey, capable of approximately 10 knots (12 mph), could take several hours to reach an incident. In 1978, the Cloughey-Portavogie lifeboat Glencoe Glasgow (ON 857) was withdrawn from service, due to development works at Portavogie Harbour, causing even greater concern.

After strenuous lobbying by Portaferry Sailing Club, and other local boatmen, an inquiry was led by Capt. A. G. Course, Inspector of Lifeboats for Ireland. A single-engined D-class lifeboat was trialled at Portaferry in 1979. On 1 May 1980, a larger twin-engined lifeboat (D-508) was placed on extended trials, establishing the station at Portaferry.

At 18:40 on 19 December 1982, in gale-force conditions, Portaferry lifeboat was launched into Strangford Lough, to the aid of the yacht Frieda, stranded with her keel wedged between to rocks, on the west side of Jane's Rock. One man was recovered to the lifeboat, but one was missing, and a search continued, unsuccessfully, until the lifeboat was stood down at 22:00. Fortunately, the man was found the next day on Dunsy Island. For this service, Helm John Desmond Rogers was awarded the RNLI Bronze Medal. Crew members William Ellison and Francis Rogers were accorded "The Thanks of the Institution inscribed on Vellum".

In 1984, the larger twin-engine D-class lifeboats were re-classified as the C-class (Zodiac Grand Raid IV), with D-506 becoming C-506.

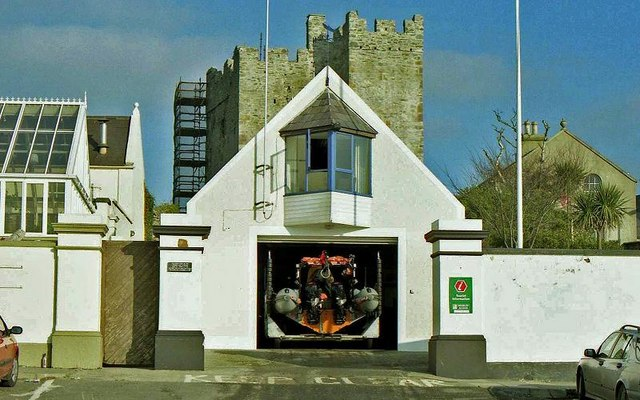
1987 lifeboathouse, Portaferry

The 1984 appeal by the BBC TV children's programme Blue Peter far exceeded its expectations. In addition to replacing four earlier lifeboats, the appeal was able to provide two extra lifeboats, one placed in the relief fleet, and an B-class (Atlantic 21) for Portaferry, which arrived on station in 1986.

A ceremony was held on 9 May 1987, to name the Atlantic 21 Blue Peter V (B-569), and also to formally open the new lifeboat house at Portaferry. The boathouse was funded through the generosity of the local community, and from donations to the Mountbatten Ulster Appeal.

On 13 June 1994, the Atlantic 21 Blue Peter V was withdrawn, and a new Atlantic 75-class was placed on service. Once again funded by an appeal by the TV programme Blue Peter, the name Blue Peter V was retained for the new boat (B-706). The 'Pieces of Eight' appeal raised over £1.4m, enough to provide seven new Inshore lifeboats, and an All-weather Trent-class lifeboat to be placed at Fishguard. At a ceremony on 17 September 1994, the lifeboat was handed over to the care of the Portaferry Lifeboat Station by Blue Peter presenter Tim Vincent.

Blue Peter V was out on a training exercise on 10 January 2006, when they received a call to the fishing vessel Greenhill, which had sunk suddenly. In the cold dark night, and extremely poor conditions, one man, of the three crew, was rescued. Searches for the remaining two men continued the following day, but just one body was found. Helm Simon Rogers was accorded "The Thanks of the Institution inscribed on Vellum", and thanks were formally given to the station. The lifeboat crew, including Sinead Breen, on her first shout, Philip Sands-Robinson and Andrew Edwards, received "The Walter and Elizabeth Groombridge Award 2006", for the outstanding inshore lifeboat rescue of the year.

A double celebration was held on Saturday 5 June 2010 at Portaferry. A new Atlantic 85-class Inshore lifeboat, costing £165,000, was again funded from the BBC's Blue Peter programme appeal. On station since 2009, the lifeboat was named Blue Peter V (ON 833), by Blue Peter presenter Andy Akinwolere. Also part of the event, was the formal handover of the new lifeboat house. Modelled in the shape of an upturned boat, and clad in stone with a copper roof, it was designed to fit in with surrounding buildings, and is estimated to have cost £750,000. The station was funded through a local appeal, and from the legacy of Ms Elsie Sturgeon, a native of Liverpool, who retired to nearby Killowen. Ten limited edition commemorative plates were specially designed for the occasion and presented to Blue Peter and the family of Elsie Sturgeon. Made by local ceramicist Donald Nelson, the remaining plates were auctioned in aid of the RNLI.

Portaferry RNLI has had a Blue Peter lifeboat at the station since 1986, the name Blue Peter V being retained at the station for each boat. Blue Peter V (B-706) was placed on service in 1994, and in 12 years, was launched 328 times, and rescued 355 people. Blue Peter V (ON 833) launched 19 times and rescued 17 people in its first year on station in 2009.

As of September 2026, Blue Peter V (ON 833) is one of the last two remaining Blue Peter lifeboats in service, the other being the Trent-class All-weather lifeboat, 14-03 Blue Peter VII (ON 1198), on station at Fishguard since 1994.

== Station honours ==
The following are awards made at Portaferry, Co. Down:

- RNLI Bronze Medal
  John Desmond Rogers, Helm – 1983
- 'The Thanks of the Institution inscribed on Vellum'
  William Ellison, crew member – 1983
  Francis Rogers, crew member – 1983
  Simon Rogers, Helm – 2006
- The Walter and Elizabeth Groombridge Award 2006
  (for the outstanding inshore lifeboat rescue of the year)
  Simon Rogers, Helm – 2006
  Sinead Breen – 2006
  Philip Sands-Robinson – 2006
  Andrew Edwards – 2006
- 'A Collective Letter of Thanks signed by the Chairman of the Institution'
  Portaferry Lifeboat Station – 2005
  Portaferry Lifeboat Station – 2006
- Member, Order of the British Empire (MBE)
  Eveleigh Finola Margaret Brownlow – 2014QBH
- British Empire Medal
  Patricia Mary Browne, chair, Portaferry Fundraising Branch – 2022QBH

== Portaferry lifeboats ==
Op.No. (Note: Op. No. is the RNLI's Operational Number of the boat carried on the hull.)	Name	On station	Class	Comments
D-508	The Chris Pirson	1980	D-class (Zodiac Grand Raid IV)	
D-506	Unnamed	1980–1986	D-class (Zodiac Grand Raid IV)	Reclassified C-506 in 1984
B-555	Long Life I	1986	B-class (Atlantic 21)	
B-569	Blue Peter V	1986–1994	B-class (Atlantic 21)	
B-706	Blue Peter V	1994–2009	B-class (Atlantic 75)	
B-833	Blue Peter V	2009–	B-class (Atlantic 85)	

=== Launch and recovery tractors ===
Op.No.	Reg. No.	Type	On Station	Comments
TA04	TBZ 3520	Ford 4000	>1993–1998	
TA36	TBZ 3520	New Holland 1920	1998–2001	
TA46	BJZ 8419	New Holland TN55D	2001–2009	
TA95	SF09 PVL	New Holland T5040	2009–2019	
TA117	SF62 SNZ	New Holland T5040	2019–2022	
TA95	SF09 PVL	New Holland T5040	2022–	

== See also ==
- List of RNLI stations
- List of former RNLI stations
- Royal National Lifeboat Institution lifeboats
