= North Berwick Lifeboat Station =

RNLI lifeboat station in East Lothian, Scotland

- North Berwick Lifeboat Station in 2023

- Location within Scotland

General information
- Type: RNLI Lifeboat Station
- Location: The Lifeboat Station, Victoria Road, North Berwick, East Lothian, EH39 4JP, Scotland
- Coordinates: 56°03′37″N 2°43′03″W
- Opened: 1860–1925; 1967–present (ILB)
- Owner: Royal National Lifeboat Institution

Website
- North Berwick RNLI Lifeboat Station

North Berwick Lifeboat Station is located on Victoria Road, in North Berwick, a seaside town and former royal burgh, sitting on the south side of the Firth of Forth, 20 miles (32 km) east of Edinburgh in East Lothian, formerly Haddingtonshire, in south-east Scotland.

A lifeboat was first stationed here by the Royal National Lifeboat Institution (RNLI) in 1860, operating until closure in 1925. An Inshore lifeboat station was established in 1967.

The station currently operates a D-class (IB1) Inshore lifeboat, Sunijo (D-891), on station since 2024.

== History ==
On the evening of Tuesday 25 October 1859, the schooner Bubona was heading to Aberdeen from Newcastle-upon-Tyne with a cargo of coal, when the wind changed direction. By 21:00, the wind was nearly hurricane force, and with her sails damaged, the boat made for shore, and ran aground off Canty Bay. Despite the Rocket Brigade getting a line to the vessel, the crew were in no fit state to take advantage. A large crown gathered onshore, but at around midnight, they witnessed the vessel break up, and all five crew perish.

The wreck of the Bubona prompted calls for a lifeboat, from Rev. Stewart of Liberton, and coastguards Capt. Woodrow and Walter Malcolm. A local committee was established, and funds were raised. North Berwick Town Council provided ground for the lifeboat house at the end of Shore Street (Victoria Road), with a lease of one penny per annum.

A 30 ft (9.1 m) self-righting 'Pulling and Sailing' (P&S) lifeboat, one with sails and six oars, was dispatched to North Berwick, transported free of charge by the Great Northern, North Eastern, and North British railway companies, arriving via the North Berwick Branch in October 1860.

The costs of the lifeboat, carriage and equipment was met by a gift of £180 by Messrs. Jaffray & Son of St Mildred's Court, London. Following a grand parade through the streets of North Berwick, with the procession directed by Sir Hew Hamilton-Dalrymple, 6th Baronet, In accordance with the wishes of Messrs. Jaffray & Son, the lifeboat was named Caroline.

In 1867, the North Berwick lifeboat was reported as unfit for service. A replacement 30 ft (9.1 m) lifeboat, previously a 6-oared lifeboat serving at Brooke on the Isle of Wight, now modified to row 10-oars, was dispatched to the station, again transported free of charge by the various railway companies. The lifeboat was again named Caroline.

On 15 June 1869, the North Berwick lifeboat Caroline was launched to the aid of the brig J. C. Howitz, on passage from Rostock to Grangemouth, when she was driven ashore in gale force conditions, and wrecked at North Berwick. The lifeboat rescued all eight crew aboard.

In 1900, a larger lifeboat house was reconstructed on the same site on Victoria Road.

Between 1920 and 1925, the lifeboats were launched only once, with no lives being claimed as saved. As a result, the station was closed in 1925. The lifeboat on station at the time of closure, Elizabeth Moore Garden (ON 616), would serve in the relief fleet until 1933.

== 1960s onwards ==
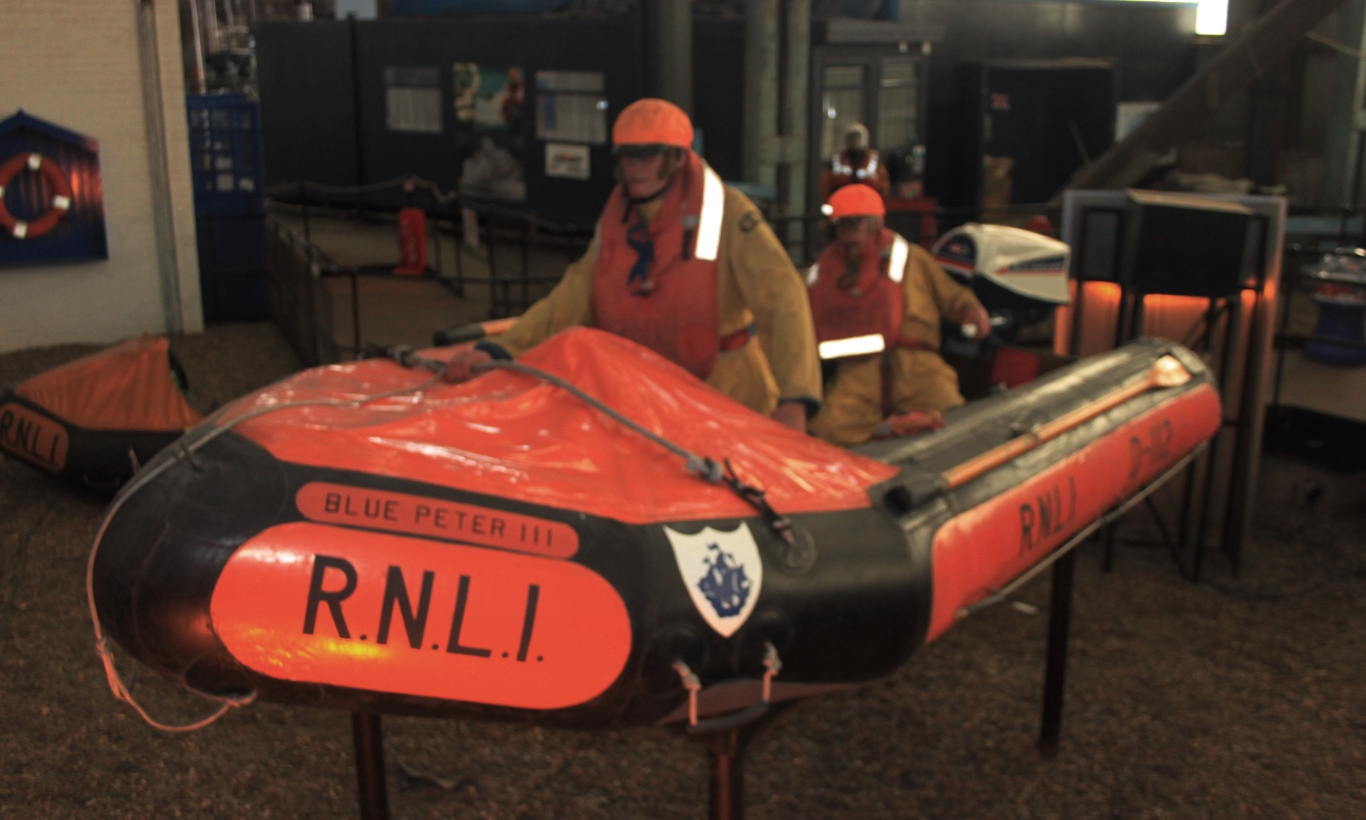
Blue Peter III (D-112) (1967–73), on display in the RNLI Heritage Collection at Chatham Historic Dockyard

In 1964, in response to an increasing amount of water-based leisure activity, the RNLI placed 25 small fast Inshore lifeboats around the country. These were easily launched with just a few people, ideal to respond quickly to local emergencies.

On 5 December 1966, the BBC children's television programme Blue Peter launched their annual appeal. The target was to receive 60,000 paperback books, the sale of which would fund a D-class (RFD PB16) Inshore lifeboat for the RNLI. Such was the success of the appeal, that 240,000 paperback books were sent in, resulting in the purchase of four Inshore lifeboats.

In addition to one boat being placed at Beaumaris, the former lifeboat stations at Littlehampton and North Berwick were re-opened as Inshore Lifeboat Stations in 1967. A new station at St Agnes in Cornwall was opened in 1968. Blue Peter III (D-112) was assigned to North Berwick.

Between the years of 1967 and 2013, five Blue Peter lifeboats were placed on station at North Berwick, all bearing the name Blue Peter III, and collectively rescued over 277 people during that time.

The re-opened station initially operated out of the lower Granary store, now owned by East Lothian Yacht Club. The original 1900 boat house was then brought back into use to house the Inshore lifeboat, when it was restored in 1991. It was extended in 1997, and is still in use today.

In 2013, the last Blue Peter III lifeboat was withdrawn. The replacement was the D-class (IB1) Evelyn M (D-758), named after Evelyn Murdoch, whose charitable trust (the Evelyn M Murdoch Charitable Trust) paid for the construction of the vessel. The lifeboat was handed over to the RNLI at a ceremony in September 2013 and was accepted on behalf of the RNLI and passed into the care of volunteer crew at North Berwick Lifeboat Station by Sir Peter Housden, Permanent Secretary of the Scottish Government and an RNLI council member. The service of dedication was led by Reverend Neil Dougall, and the boat was named Evelyn M by Helen Hanson, trustee of the Miss Evelyn M Murdoch Charitable Trust.

Evelyn M (D-758) served at North Berwick for 11 years. In 2024, a new lifeboat was funded by Nigel and Patricia Dewar Gibb, of Glasgow. Named Sunijo (D-891), the name comes from the first two letters of their three children; Susannah, Nigel and Joanna.

== Bronze medal service ==
On 26 July 1973, the North Berwick lifeboat Blue Peter III was launched at 15:00, to reports of bathers in difficulty in poor conditions in East Bay. One man was spotted at 15:10, and in rough conditions, was hauled aboard the lifeboat. Two large waves then battered the lifeboat, damaging the boat, and injuring the survivor and one crewman. A second person was then spotted, but by the time the lifeboat reached the location, nobody was found.

The survivor, Mr Pagett, was returned to shore, where the lifeboat was joined by another crewman for extra stability, and headed back out to search for the second person. The lifeboat searched for a further hour, and was joined by an RAF helicopter, which carried on the search until 18:30 with no success. It later emerged that two people had attempted to rescue a girl in difficulties. Mr Pagett had then set out in a small boat, but was capsized. Whilst the girl had been dragged ashore, the two people who first attempted a rescue had drowned.

For this service, Helm Benjamin Pearson and crew member Alexander Russell were each awarded the RNLI Bronze Medal, whilst crew member James Pearson was accorded the "Thanks of the Institution inscribed on Vellum". The three crewmen were later guests on Blue Peter, where they were each presented with a Gold Blue Peter Badge by presenters Peter Purves, John Noakes and Lesley Judd.

== Station honours ==
The following are awards made at North Berwick:

- RNLI Bronze Medal
  Benjamin Pearson, Helm – 1973
  Alexander Russell, crew member – 1973
- 'The Thanks of the Institution inscribed on Vellum'
  James Pearson, crew member – 1973
- 'A Letter of Thanks, signed by the Director of the Institution'
  Thomas Brown, shore crew – 1973
- British Empire Medal
  For services to the Royal National Lifeboat Institution and to the community in North Berwick.
  Alexander Stewart Auld – 2020QBH

== North Berwick lifeboats ==
=== Pulling and Sailing (P&S) lifeboats ===
ON (Note: ON is the RNLI's Official Number of the boat.)	Name	Built	On station	Class	Comments
Pre-367	Caroline	1860	1860–1867	30-foot Peake self-righting (P&S)	(Note: 30 ft 0 in (9.14 m) x 7 ft 0 in (2.13 m) (6-oared) Peake-class self-righting (P&S) lifeboat, gift of J. R. Jaffray & Sons of London, built by Forrestt of Limehouse, London, costing £145.); Modified to 10-oars in 1865. Broken up in 1867.
Pre-364	Caroline	1860	1867–1871	30-foot Peake self-righting (P&S)	(Note: 30 ft 0 in (9.14 m) x 7 ft 0 in (2.13 m) (10-oared) self-righting (P&S) lifeboat, gift of J. R. Jaffray & Sons of London, built by Forrestt of Limehouse, London, costing £148.); Previously Dauntless at Brooke. Modified to 10-oars in 1867. Found to be decayed in 1871.
Pre-564	Freemasons	1871	1871–1887	30-foot self-righting (P&S)	(Note: 30 ft 0 in (9.14 m) x 7 ft 8 in (2.34 m) (10-oared) self-righting (P&S) lifeboat, gift of the Freemasons of England (Lodge of Faith No.141), built by Forrestt of Limehouse, London, costing £236.); Broken up in 1887
121	Fergus Ferguson	1887	1887–1902	34-foot self-righting (P&S)	(Note: 34 ft 0 in (10.36 m) x 7 ft 6 in (2.29 m) (10-oared) self-righting (P&S) lifeboat, legacy of Mrs A. Ferguson of Bolton, built by Woolfe of Shadwell, London, costing £371.); Transferred to Walton on the Naze as a boarding boat. Sold in 1922.
502	Norman Clark	1902	1902–1920	35-foot self-righting (P&S)	(Note: 35 ft 0 in (10.67 m) x 8 ft 6 in (2.59 m) (10-oared) self-righting (P&S) lifeboat, legacy of Mr N. Clarke of Paisley, built by Thames Ironworks of Blackwall, London, costing £820.); Sold in 1921.
453	John William Dudley	1900	1920–1923	35-foot self-righting (P&S)	(Note: 35 ft 0 in (10.67 m) x 8 ft 6 in (2.59 m) (10-oared) self-righting (P&S) lifeboat, legacy of Mr J. W. Dudley of Woodford, Essex, built by Thames Ironworks of Blackwall, London, costing £831.); Previously at Rye Harbour and Newquay. Sold from the Relief fleet in 1933. Renamed Gull. Last reported at Littlehampton, June 1966.
616	Elizabeth Moore Garden	1911	1923–1925	35-foot Rubie self-righting (P&S)	(Note: 35 ft 0 in (10.67 m) x 8 ft 10 in (2.69 m) 910-oared) Rubie-class self-righting (P&S) lifeboat, gift of the family of the late Mr R. T. Garden of London, built by Thames Ironworks of Blackwall, London, costing £1,051.); Previously at Bude. Sold from the Relief fleet in 1933.

Station closed, 1925
Pre ON numbers are unofficial numbers used by the Lifeboat Enthusiasts' Society to reference early lifeboats not included on the official RNLI list.

=== Inshore lifeboats (ILBs) ===
Op.No. (Note: Op.No. is the RNLI's Operational Number of the boat, carried on the hull.)	Name	On station	Class	Comments
D-112	Blue Peter III	1967–1973	D-class (RFD PB16)	
D-216	Blue Peter III	1973–1985	D-class (RFD PB16)	
D-306	Blue Peter III	1985–1994	D-class (RFD PB16)	
D-452	Blue Peter III	1994–2003	D-class (EA16)	
D-570	Roger B Harbour	2003–2004	D-class (EA16)	
D-619	Blue Peter III	2004–2013	D-class (IB1)	
D-758	Evelyn M	2013–2024	D-class (IB1)	
D-891	Sunijo	2024–	D-class (IB1)	

== See also ==
- List of RNLI stations
- List of former RNLI stations
- Royal National Lifeboat Institution lifeboats
