= Chichester Harbour Lifeboat Station =

Former RNLI lifeboat station in West Sussex, England

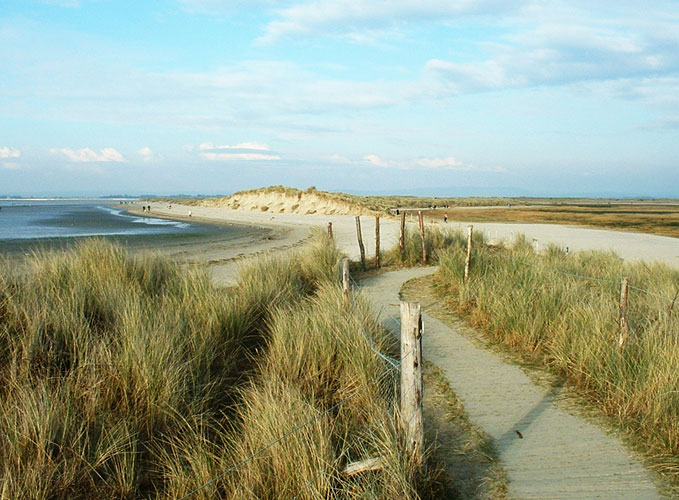
- East Head, West Sussex

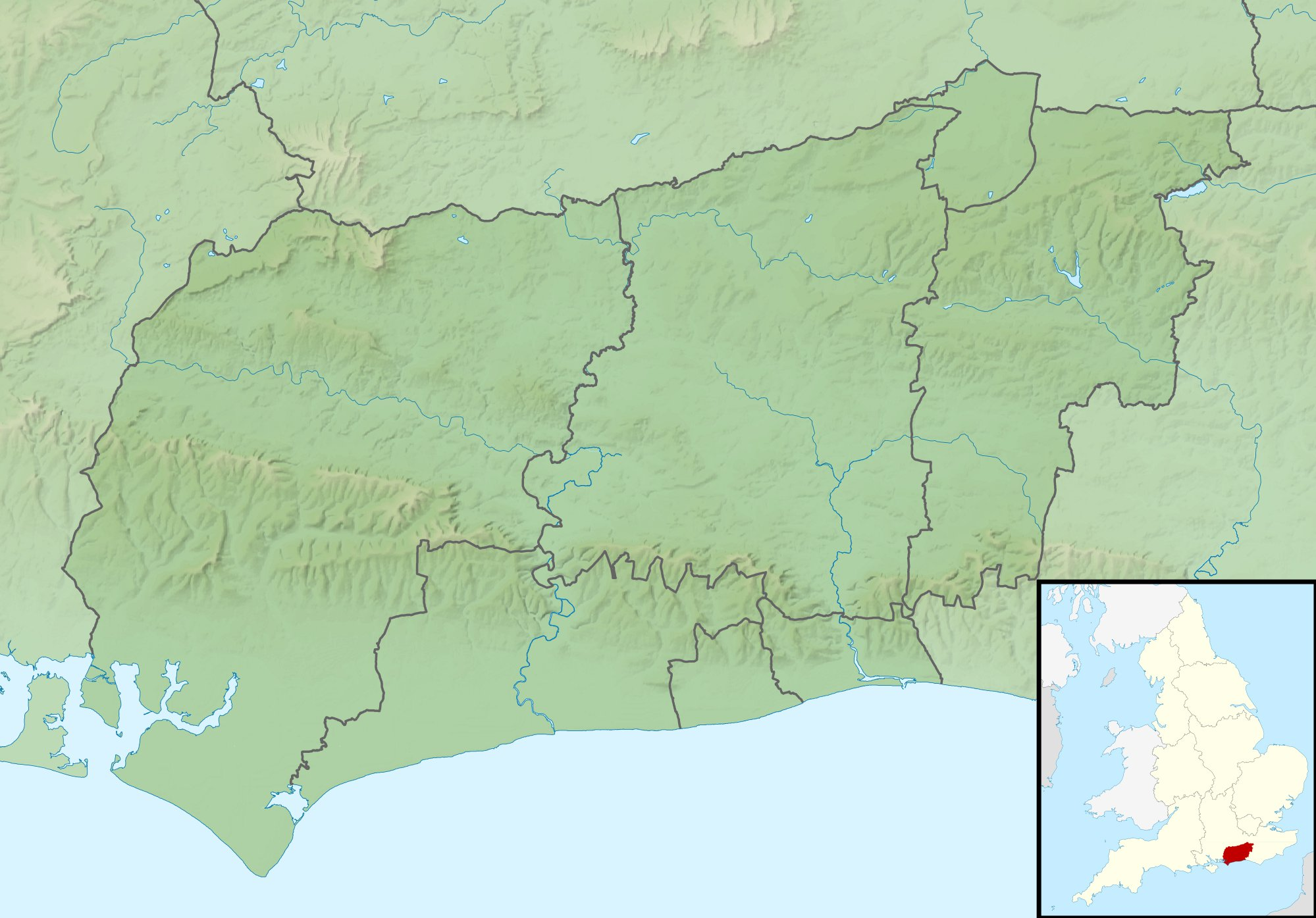
- Location within West Sussex
- Alternative names: West Wittering Lifeboat Station

General information
- Status: Closed
- Type: RNLI Lifeboat Station
- Location: East Head, West Wittering, West Sussex, England
- Coordinates: 50°47′09.6″N 0°54′53.4″W
- Opened: 1867
- Closed: 1884

Chichester Harbour Lifeboat Station (sometimes knows as West Wittering Lifeboat Station) was located at the entrance to Chichester Harbour on East Head, a shingle spit located to the west of West Wittering, on the Manhood Peninsula in West Sussex.

A lifeboat was stationed at East Head in 1867 by the Royal National Lifeboat Institution (RNLI).

Chichester Harbour Lifeboat Station was closed in 1884.

== History ==
Ever since its founding in 1824, the Royal National Institution for the Preservation of Life from Shipwreck (RNIPLS), later to become the RNLI in 1854, would award medals for deeds of gallantry at sea, even if no lifeboats were involved.

On 30 November 1837, the sloop Ann of Portsmouth was driven onto the shoals of Chichester in a gale. The Master drowned, but three men were rescued from the rigging of the sunken vessel by Lt. Westbrook and three local Pilots, who put out in a small boat. Lt. Edmund Barford Westbrook, RN, H.M. Coastguard Chichester Harbour, was awarded the RNIPLS Silver Medal.

Following a visit and report by the Inspector of Lifeboats, at the meeting of the RNLI committee of management on Thurday 4 October 1866, it was decided to establish a lifeboat station near West Wittering at the entrance to Chichester harbour. "..circumstances having occurred which showed the necessity of placing an additional life-boat on this dangerous part of the coast, for service to vessels which might be wrecked on the shoals off the entrance to the harbour. A good crew can always be depended on for the boat, there being plenty of coastguardmen on the watch-vessel at the mouth of the harbour, and at the adjacent coastguard station on shore."

A 30-foot 6-oared lifeboat with transporting carriage was to be provided, and a wooden boathouse constructed for its accommodation. At a further meeting on Thursday 1 November, it was reported that a letter had been received on 23 October 1866 from Mr. Richard Thornton West, an East India merchant, of Streatham Hall, Exeter, along with a cheque for £620, to defray the cost of placing a lifeboat at West Wittering, and for it to be named Undaunted.

The new lifeboat, along with its carriage, was transported from London to Chichester free of charge by the London, Brighton and South Coast railway company. On 20 June 1867, fully crewed, the lifeboat was drawn on its carriage in grand procession from Chichester railway station to Bosham church, where a large crowd had assembled to greet the boat. After a service at the church, assisted by the Bishop of Chichester, the lifeboat was then taken to Bosham quay, and duly named Undaunted as requested by the donor. With the permission of the landowner, Lord Fitzhardinge, the lord of the manor, the lifeboat was launched for demonstration, accompanied by the lifeboat from Hayling Island, which had been rowed over for the occasion.

In July 1872, the lifeboat was launched to the aid of the brig Hope of Portsmouth, at anchor 2 miles (3.2 km) off the mouth of the harbour, indicating distress signals. The lifeboat was not required, but stood by, until the vessel was towed into Portsmouth Harbour by a steamer.

A replacement lifeboat, along with its carriage, was sent to Chichester Harbour in 1873. The 32-foot lifeboat was slightly larger than the first lifeboat, and now rowed 10-oars, but was actually two years older, having previously served at Newquay since 1865. On arrival at Chichester Harbour, it again took the name Undaunted.

In an ideal world, a lifeboat should not be required. Such was the fate of the Chichester Lifeboat, as no further service records can be found, and in such cases, an asset will likely be transferred elsewhere, to be of greater value. On 25 August 1884, a new station was opened at Littlehampton, and the Chichester Harbour lifeboat Undaunted was transferred to the new station. Chichester Harbour Lifeboat Station was closed. Nothing remains of the wooden boathouse on East Head.

== Station honours ==
The following are awards made at Chichester Harbour.

- RNIPLS Silver Medal

Lt. Edmund Barford Westbrook, RN, H.M. Coastguard, Chichester Harbour – 1838

- The Thanks of the Institution inscribed on Vellum

John Montgomery, Coxswain – 1877

== Chichester Harbour lifeboats ==
=== Pulling and Sailing (P&S) lifeboats ===
ON (Note: ON is the RNLI's Official Number of the boat.)	Name	Built	On station	Class	Comments
Pre-508	Undaunted	1867	1867−1873	30-foot Peake Self-righting (P&S)	(Note: 30-foot x 6-foot 7in (6-oared) Peake-class self-righting (P&S) lifeboat, gift of Mr & Mrs R. Thornton-West of Streatham Hall, Exeter, built by Woolfe of Shadwell, London, costing £232)
Pre-435	Undaunted	1865	1873−1884	32-foot Prowse Self-righting (P&S)	(Note: 32-foot x 7-foot 5in (10-oared) Prowse-class self-righting (P&S) lifeboat, gift of Mr & Mrs R. Thornton-West of Streatham Hall, Exeter, built by Forrestt of Limehouse, London, costing £210 when new.); Previous Joshua, later James & Elizabeth at Newquay. Refit in 1873.

Station closed, 1884.
Pre ON numbers are unofficial numbers used by the Lifeboat Enthusiast Society to reference early lifeboats not included on the official RNLI list.

== See also ==
- List of RNLI stations
- List of former RNLI stations
- Royal National Lifeboat Institution lifeboats
