= Littlehampton Lifeboat Station =

RNLI lifeboat station in West Sussex, England

- Littlehampton Lifeboat Station in 2026

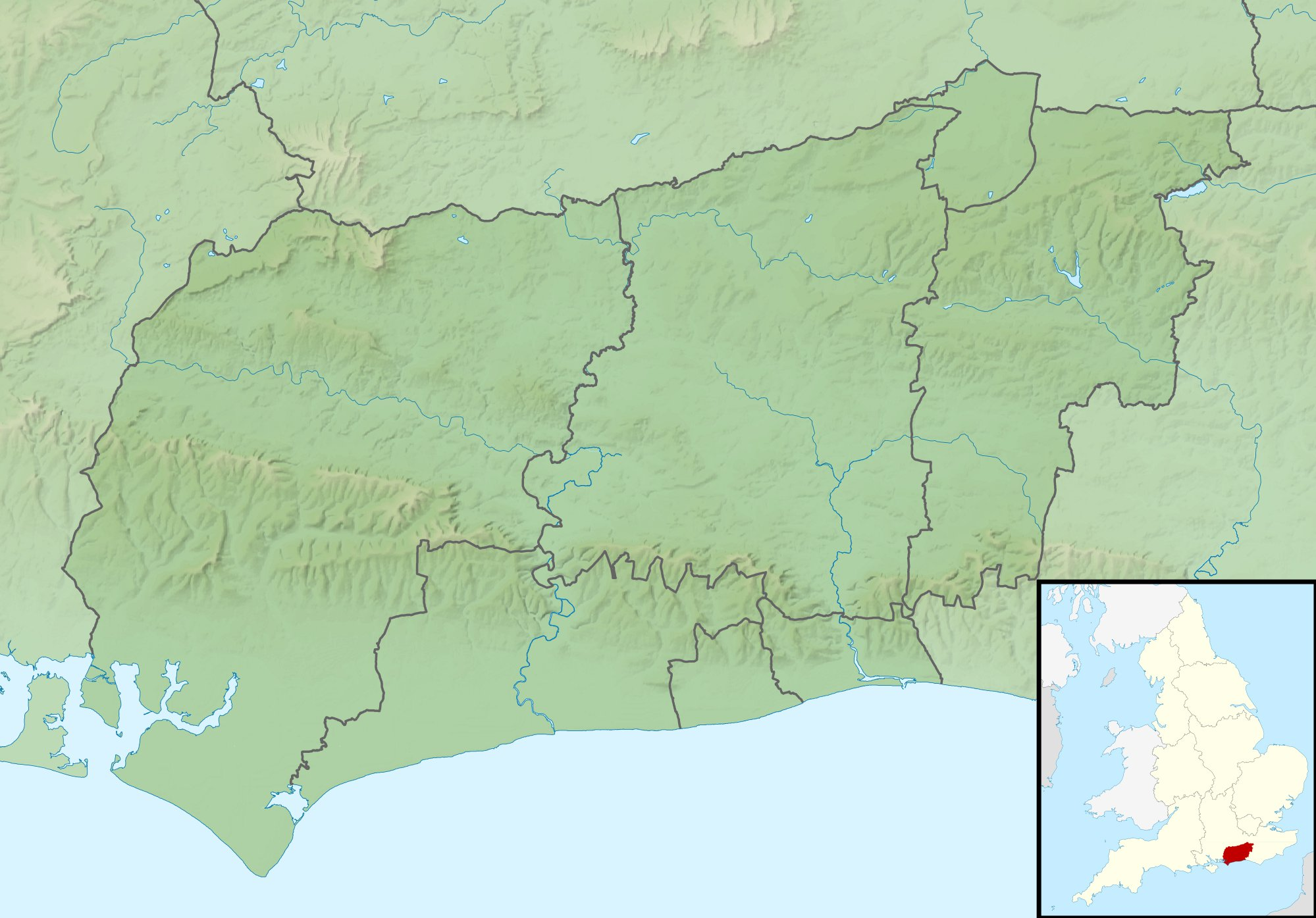
- Location within West Sussex

General information
- Type: RNLI Lifeboat Station
- Architectural style: Steel-frame Boathouse with brick and block construction
- Location: Fisherman's Quay, Littlehampton, West Sussex, BN17 5BL, England
- Coordinates: 50°48′28.9″N 0°32′40.6″W
- Opened: 1884–1921; 1967–present
- Owner: Royal National Lifeboat Institution

Website
- Littlehampton RNLI Lifeboat Station

Littlehampton Lifeboat Station is located in the town of Littlehampton, in West Sussex, on the south coast of England. The station is on the harbour side on the eastern bank of the River Arun, a quarter mile from the harbour entrance and the pier.

A lifeboat station was established here by the Royal National Lifeboat Institution (RNLI) in 1884.

The lifeboat station currently operates with two Inshore lifeboats: a B-class (Atlantic 85) lifeboat, Renee Sherman (B-891), on station since 2016, and a D-class (IB1) lifeboat, Spirit of Fidelity (D-902), on station since 2025.

== History ==
In a violent storm of 13 November 1840, the brig Victoria was driven ashore at Littlehampton. A line was drifted ashore, and two Coastguard officers, along with their team of men, hauled a small boat out to the wreck three times, and saved the nine men aboard. On the same day, they also waded out into the surf with lines attached, and saved five men off the sloop Lively of Poole. Ever since its founding in 1824, the Royal National Institution for the Preservation of Life from Shipwreck (RNIPLS), later to become the RNLI in 1854, would award medals for deeds of gallantry at sea, even if no lifeboats were involved. Lt. Timothy Macnamara was awarded the RNIPLS Gold Medal, with Lt. George Davies receiving the RNIPLS Silver Medal.

In 1884, with lifeboats placed at Hayling Island, Bembridge and Selsey, it was decided to close the lifeboat station at Chichester Harbour, and create a new lifeboat station at Littlehampton. A boathouse was constructed for £311-1s-7d, on a site on the east bank of the River Arun, provided by the War Department, near what is now the Harbour Park amusement park.

A 32 ft (9.8 m) 'Pulling and Sailing' (P&S) lifeboat, one with oars and sails, the 19-year-old lifeboat James and Elizabeth, was transferred from the Chichester Harbour station on 25 August 1884. The boat, manned by fishermen and local coastguard, was taken in procession around the town to the station, where she was renamed Undaunted. On station for only four years, she would be launched just twice, but was not required to rescue anyone.

A new 34 ft (10 m) lifeboat, James, Mercer and Elizabeth (ON 172), was placed at Littlehampton in 1888. On 2 November 1901, the lifeboat was launched to the aid of the brigantine Amy of Plymouth, on passage from Sunderland to Exeter with a cargo of coal, and now driven ashore. With extreme difficulty, the Littlehampton lifeboat got along side, and rescued the crew of six. In the poor conditions, the boat was beached at East Preston, and later returned to station on her carriage. This lifeboat would rescue 12 people in her 16 years on station.

In 1903, the Coastguard site at Littlehampton was re-developed, and a row of terraced cottages were constructed along what became Coastguard road. The boathouse had to be moved, and was reconstructed at the end of the terrace, at the junction with Arun Parade, at a cost of £240. A new 35 ft (11 m) lifeboat was placed at Littlehampton in 1904, provided from the legacy of Mr. Francis J. Freeman, of Abbey Road, St John's Wood, London, and named Brothers Freeman (ON 531). The boat would be launched 14 times over the next 17 years, and rescue 10 lives.

Following the retirementof Coxswain G. J. Pelham in November 1918, who had served in this role since the station opened in 1884, and also Second (and latterly Acting) Coxswain Alonzo Allen in January 1919, Honorary Secretary Mr. Griffiths reported that no replacement officers were appointed to the lifeboat, and finding a crew was proving extremely difficult. Littlehampton lifeboat station was closed temporarily in February 1921. However, with a motor-lifeboat planned to be placed at Selsey in 1922, Littlehampton Lifeboat Station closed permanently on 5 December 1921. Brothers Freeman (ON 531) was withdrawn, and transferred to Plymouth.

=== Reopening and Blue Peter appeals ===
In 1964, in response to an increasing amount of water-based leisure activity, the RNLI placed 25 small fast Inshore lifeboats around the country. These were easily launched with just a few people, ideal to respond quickly to local emergencies.

More stations were gradually opened, and on 5 December 1966, an appeal for 60,000 paperback books was made by the BBC TV Children's programme Blue Peter, the sale of which would raise £650 to fund the purchase of one new Inshore lifeboat for the RNLI. Within three weeks, sufficient paperbacks had been donated for the purchase of three inshore rescue boats. The first boat, named Blue Peter 1, was exhibited at the Boat Show, which prompted further donations. At the end of the appeal, 250,000 paperback books had been sent in. Instead of just one lifeboat, four new Blue Peter lifeboats were provided.

In 1967, two former lifeboat stations were re-established; at North Berwick and at Littlehampton, and a third boat was placed at Beaumaris. A new Inshore lifeboat station was created at St Agnes in Cornwall in 1968. These four stations received Blue Peter 3, Blue Peter 1, Blue Peter 2 and Blue Peter 4 respectively.

Littlehampton initially operated the D-class (RFD PB16) Inshore lifeboat Blue Peter I (D-115), housed in a garage on the east bank of the river Arun.

The original Blue Peter I lifeboat would come to be replaced five times, with subsequent lifeboats being of the larger twin-engined Atlantic type. Funded each time by appeals on Blue Peter, each replacement lifeboat retained the name Blue Peter I until 2016.

For more information on Blue Peter lifeboats, please see:–

- Blue Peter lifeboats

=== 1979–present ===
In 1979, a new boathouse was built for the station near Fishermen's Quay, enabling quick launch down a short ramp into the River Arun.

In 2002, the station underwent a large re-development to fit in with the recent waterside changes in the area. The new station has been designed specifically as a two-boat station at a cost of £550,000. At this time, the station was provided with a B-class (Atlantic 75) lifeboat, Blue Peter I (B-779), at a cost of £100,000.

A new D-class (IB1) Inshore lifeboat, Spirit of Juniper (D-631), was donated by the Campaign for Real Gin in 2004, at a cost of £25,000, and served until 2014. She was replaced by Ray of Hope (D-769), a later version of the D-Class IB1, funded by a private donor at a cost of £42,000.

The last Blue Peter I was replaced in 2016 by a B-class (Atlantic 85) boat, Rennee Sherman (B-891).

The Littlehampton lifeboat station was the busiest in the West Sussex area, with 61 call outs in 2020, and 913 between 2008 and 2020.

A ceremony was held at Littlehampton on Saturday 27 September 2025, for the dedication and naming of the new D-class (IB1) Inshore lifeboat. Funded by long-time RNLI supporters Michael and Alison Veale, they handed the new lifeboat to RNLI Trustee Andrew Jordan, who accepted the lifeboat on behalf of the RNLI, and in turn passed the boat to the care of Operations Manager Nick White for Littlehampton RNLI. Station chaplain and crew member Mike Meachin led a service of dedication, before Michael and Alison officially named the lifeboat Spirit of Fidelity (D-902), with the traditional bottle of champagne.

== Station honours ==
The following are awards made at Littlehampton:

- RNIPLS Gold Medal
  Lt. Timothy Macnamara, RN, H.M. Coastguard, Littlehampton – 1840
- RNIPLS Silver Medal
  Lt. George Davies, RN, H.M. Coastguard, Littlehampton – 1840
- 'The Thanks of the Institution inscribed on Vellum'
  C. R. Cole, crew member – 1970
  C. J. Pelham, crew member – 1970
  David William Woollven, Helm – 1982

== Littlehampton lifeboats ==
=== Pulling and Sailing (P&S) lifeboats ===
ON (Note: ON is the RNLI's Official Number of the boat.)	Name	Built	On station	Class	Comments
Pre-435	Undaunted	1865	1884–1888	32-foot Prowse self-righting (P&S)	(Note: 32 ft 0 in (9.75 m) x 7 ft 5 in (2.26 m)32-foot x 7-foot 5in (10-oared) Prowse-class self-righting (P&S) lifeboat, gift of Mr & Mrs R. West of Streatham Hill, built by Forrestt of Limehouse, London, costing £210 when new.); Previously at Newquay and Chichester Harbour. Sold in 1888.
172	James, Mercer and Elizabeth	1888	1888–1904	34-foot self-righting (P&S)	(Note: 34 ft 0 in (10.36 m) x 7 ft 6 in (2.29 m) (10-oared) self-righting (P&S) lifeboat, gift of Mrs Stoker of Hull, built by Woolfe & Son, of Shadwell, London, costing £329.); Broken up in 1904.
531	Brothers Freeman	1904	1904–1921	35-foot self-righting (P&S)	(Note: 35 ft 0 in (10.67 m) x 8 ft 6 in (2.59 m) (10-oared) self-righting (P&S) lifeboat, legacy of Mr F. J. Freeman of London, built by Thames Ironworks of Blackwall, London, costing £800.); Transferred to Plymouth.

Station closed in 1921
Pre ON numbers are unofficial numbers used by the Lifeboat Enthusiasts' Society to reference early lifeboats not included on the official RNLI list.

=== Inshore lifeboats ===
==== D class ====
Op.No. (Note: Op.No. is the RNLI's Operational Number of the boat carried on the hull.)	Name	On station	Class	Comments
D-115	Blue Peter I	1967–1972	D-class (RFD PB16)	
D-class withdrawn, 1972–2003
D-431	Veronica	2003–2004	D-class (EA16)	
D-458	Maureen Samuels	2004	D-class (EA16)	
D-631	Spirit of Juniper	2004–2014	D-class (IB1)	
D-769	Ray of Hope	2014–2025	D-class (IB1)	
D-902	Spirit of Fidelity	2025–	D-class (IB1)	

==== B class ====
Op.No.	Name	On station	Class	Comments
B-504	Blue Peter I	1972–1973	B-class (Atlantic 21)	
B-517	Blue Peter I	1973–1974	B-class (Atlantic 21)	
B-523	Blue Peter I	1974–1985	B-class (Atlantic 21)	
B-564	Blue Peter I	1985–2001	B-class (Atlantic 21)	
B-779	Blue Peter I	2002–2016	B-class (Atlantic 75)	
B-891	Renée Sherman	2016–	B-class (Atlantic 85)	

== Gallery ==
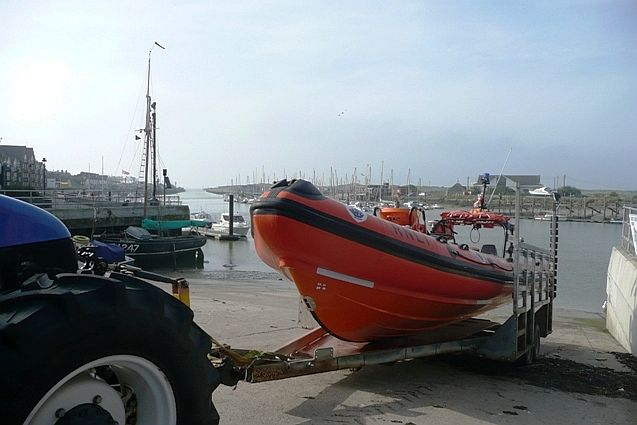
The Littlehampton Atlantic 75-class lifeboat Blue Peter 1 (B-779) being retrieved by the stations TC45 tractor in its launch cradle on the slipway outside the lifeboat station at Fishermen’s Quay on the banks of the River Arun.

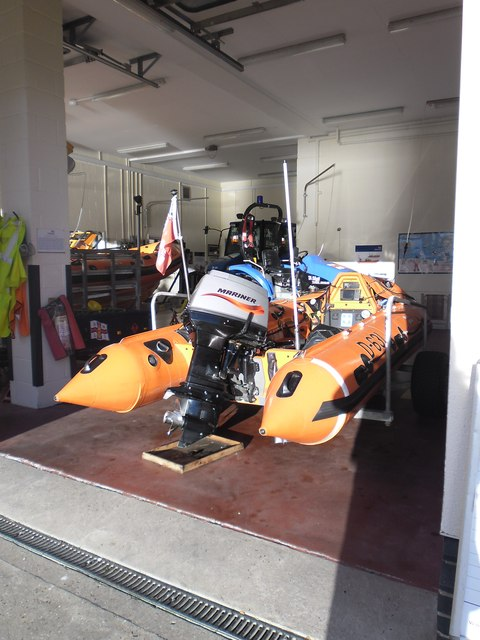
The Littlehampton D-class Spirit of Juniper (D-631) was on station from 2004 to 2014, here inside the boathouse at Fishermen’s Quay, Littlehampton.

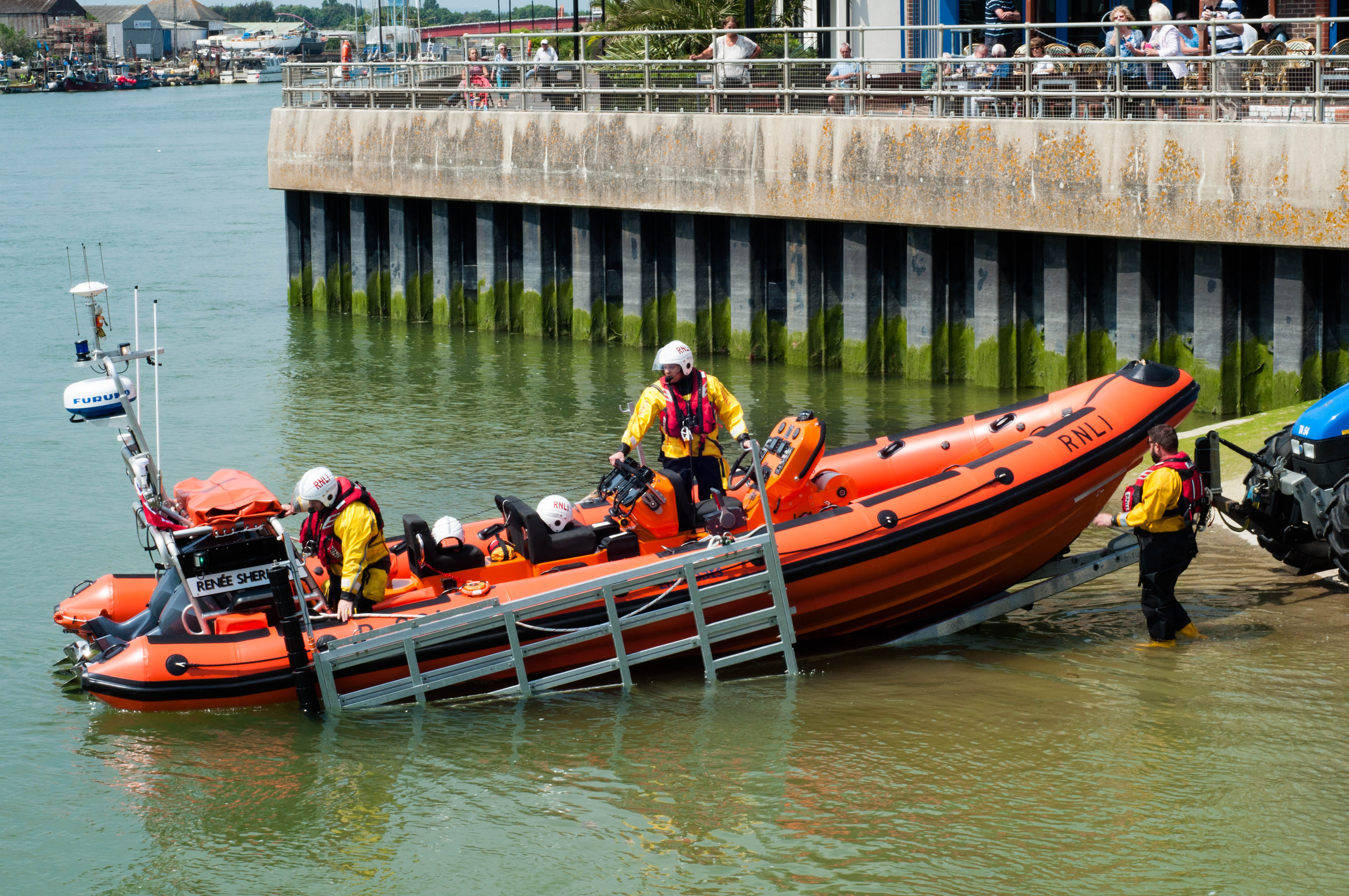
Rennee Sherman (B-891) being launched in a cradle in the river Arun, Littlehampton Lifeboat Station, 9 May 2016.

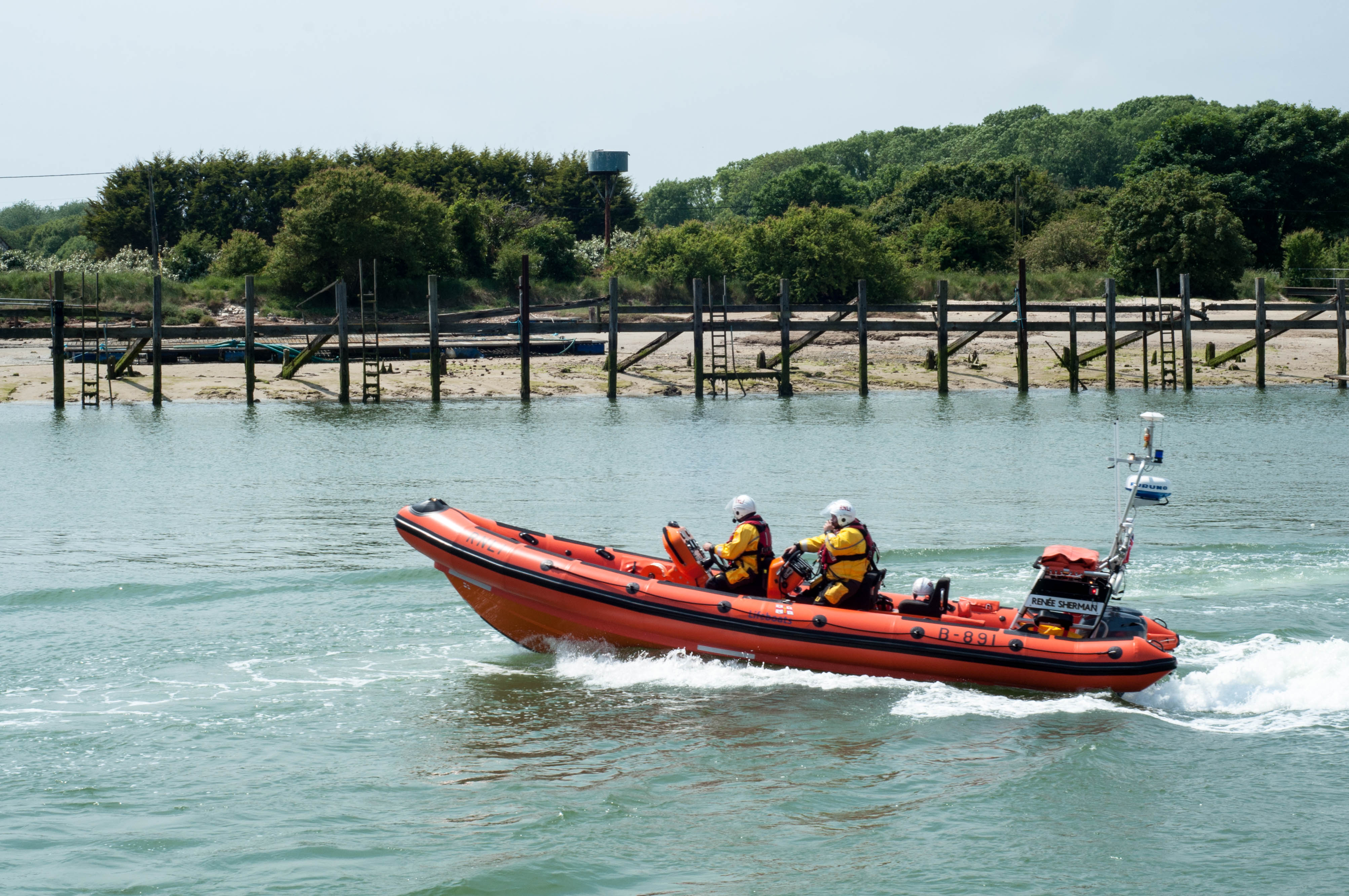
Rennee Sherman (B-891) in the river Arun heading out to sea, 9 May 2016.

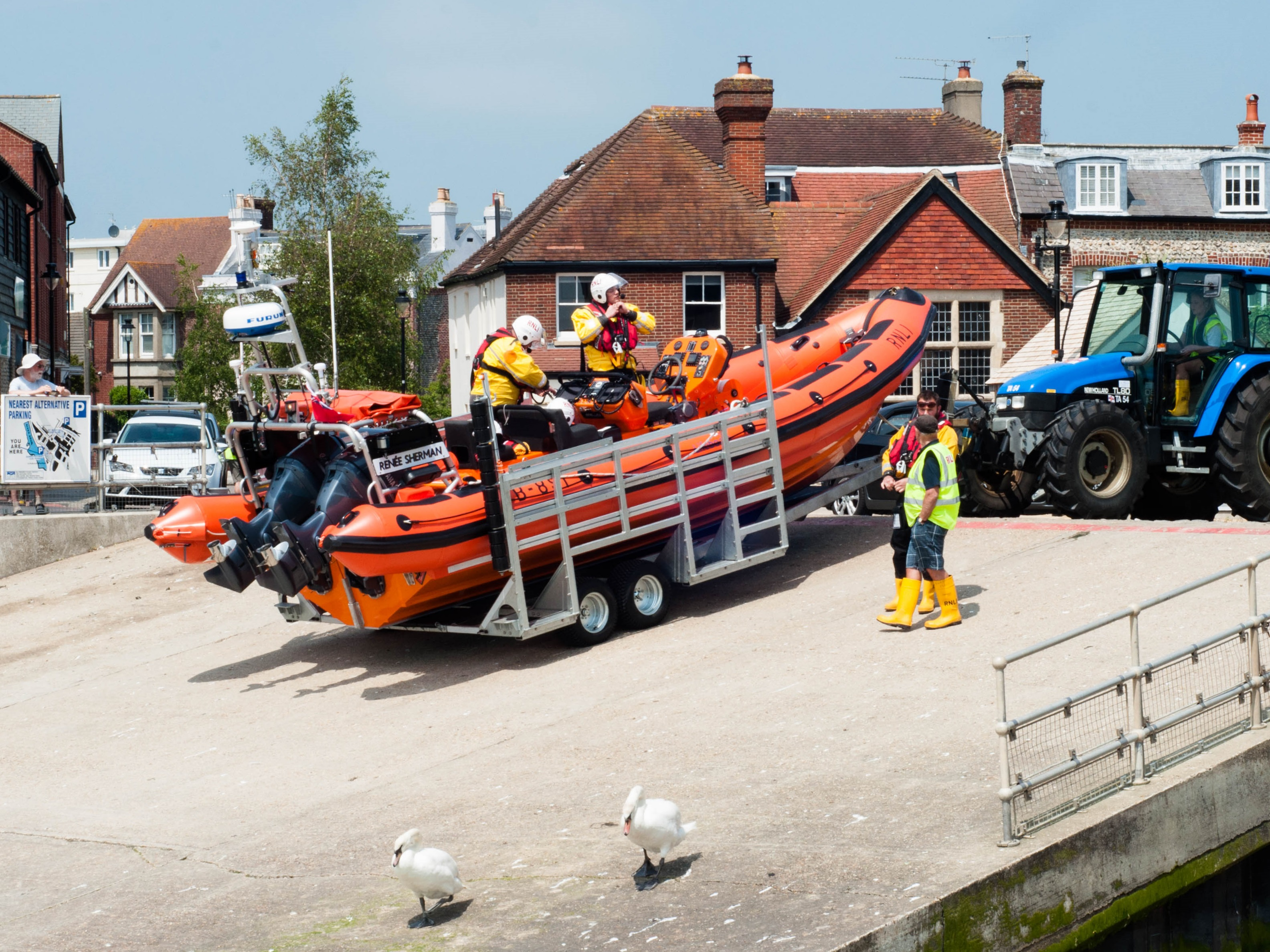
Rennee Sherman (B-891) being launched from Littlehampton Lifeboat Station, 9 May 2016.

== See also ==
- List of RNLI stations
- List of former RNLI stations
- Royal National Lifeboat Institution lifeboats
