= Tre-Castell =

Coordinates: 53.285321°N 4.087229°W

- Location within Anglesey
- OS grid reference: SH 6095 7851
  - Cardiff: 130.4 mi (209.9 km)
  - London: 207.2 mi (333.5 km)
- Community: Beaumaris
- Principal area: Anglesey
- Country: Wales
- Sovereign state: United Kingdom
- Post town: Beaumaris
- Police: North Wales
- Fire: North Wales
- Ambulance: Welsh
- UK Parliament: Ynys Môn
- Senedd Cymru – Welsh Parliament: Ynys Môn

Tre-Castell is a hamlet in the community of Beaumaris, Anglesey, Wales, which is 130.4 miles (209.9 km) from Cardiff and 207.2 miles (333.4 km) from London. It is also home to the Gruffudd-Jones family who reside at Tre-Castell hall

== See also ==
- List of localities in Wales by population
