= Beaumaris Lifeboat Station =

RNLI lifeboat station in Anglesey, Wales

- Gorsaf Bad Achub Beaumaris

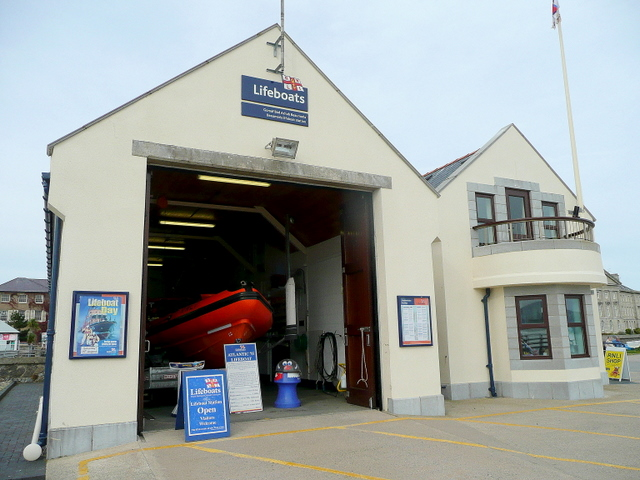
- Beaumaris Lifeboat Station

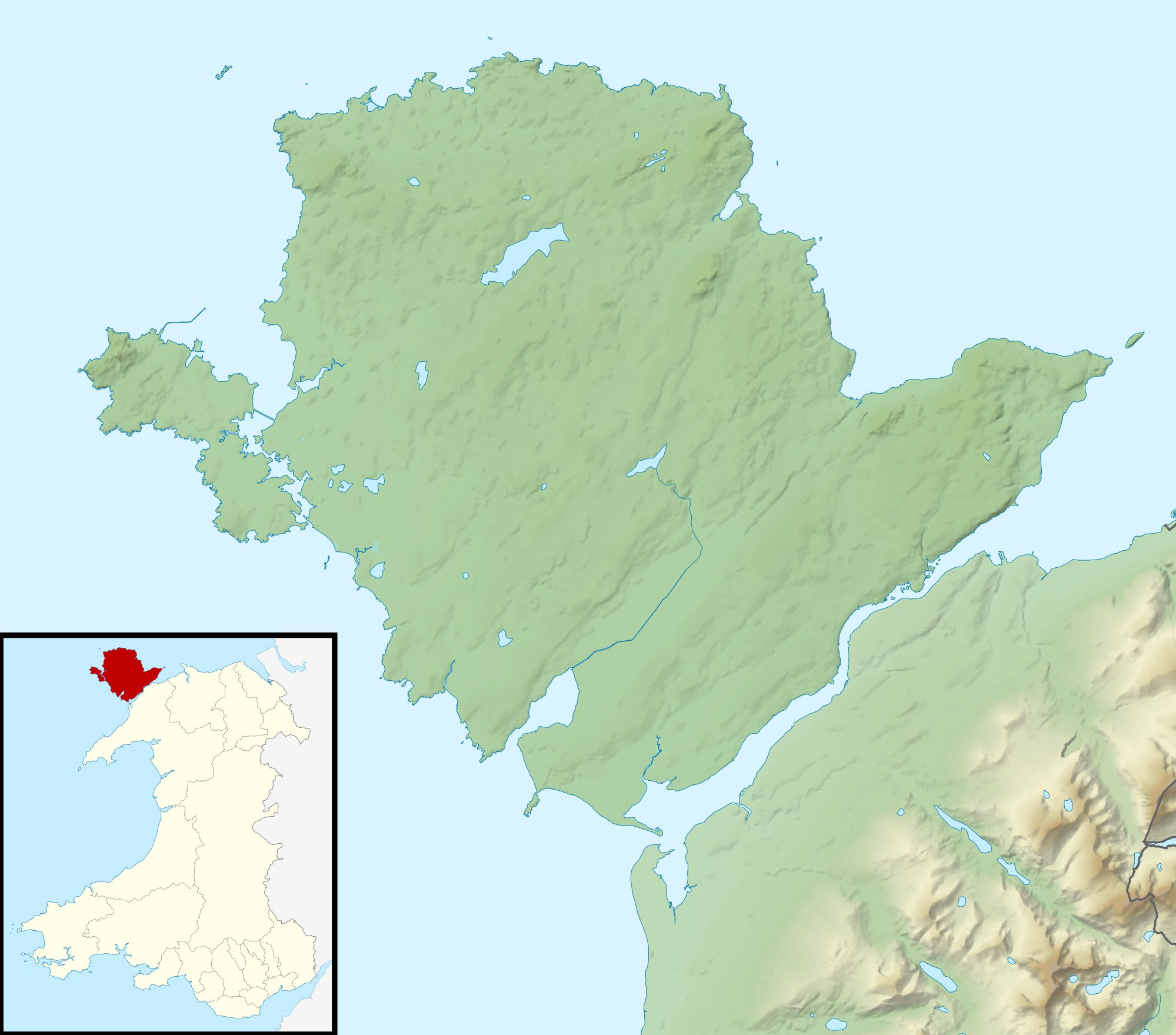
- Location within Anglesey

General information
- Type: RNLI Lifeboat Station
- Location: Beaumaris Lifeboat Station, The Green, Beaumaris, Anglesey, LL58 8BS, Wales
- Coordinates: 53°15′44.0″N 4°05′26.9″W
- Opened: 1891–1896; 1914–Present
- Owner: Royal National Lifeboat Institution

Website
- Beaumaris RNLI Lifeboat Station

Beaumaris Lifeboat Station (Welsh Gorsaf Bad Achub Beaumaris) is located at The Green in Beaumaris, a town overlooking the eastern entrance to the Menai Strait, on the south-east coast of the Isle of Anglesey, in North Wales.

A lifeboat was first stationed here by the Royal National Lifeboat Institution (RNLI) in 1891.

For many years, Beaumaris was home to four different Inshore lifeboats, all named Blue Peter II, after funds were raised by the BBC TV programme, but since 2010, the station has operated the B-class (Atlantic 85) Inshore lifeboat Annette Mary Liddington (B-838).

== History ==
On 7 November 1890, in rough seas and gale-force conditions, a vessel appeared to be in distress in the Menai Strait. The Penmon lifeboat Christopher Brown was launched, but on arrival, assistance was declined. With other vessels making for safety, the lifeboat stayed afloat, ready to assist. The schooner Undaunted of Plymouth was then seen flying signals of distress, having lost her anchor, and drifting towards the Lavan Sands.

After rescuing the crew of five, the lifeboat was caught by a wave, and capsized. The boat soon self-righted, and all regained the boat, which was then beached at Aber on the mainland.

Following this, the Penmon crew requested of the RNLI, that a larger sailing lifeboat be placed in the Menai Strait. Beaumaris Lifeboat Station was established with the arrival of the 42-foot lifeboat Henry Dundas (ON 271), previously at St Mary's, Isles of Scilly, on 6 October 1891. The boat was moored afloat, and renamed Tom and Jenny.

The lifeboat was called on service six times over the following four years, rescuing two lives. However, in 1896, a new larger boat was placed at Penmon, and the Beaumaris station was closed on 16 April 1896. Tom and Jenny (ON 271) would be transferred to Rosslare Harbour, where she would serve for a further 15 years.

In 1910, it was decided to re-open the Beaumaris station, and place a motor-powered lifeboat there. Construction began of a new boathouse, pier and deep-water roller-slipway near Tre-Castell Point, costing £4,500. An order was placed with Thames Ironworks for a 43-foot Watson-class lifeboat, with a 60-hp Tylor 'D' petrol engine, providing 7½ knots, and costing a further £3,727. Completed in August 1913, she was first taken to Cowes Regatta, where a short trip was taken by King George V. The boat remained in Cowes due to construction delays with the new boathouse, eventually arriving in Beaumaris in July 1914, where it would be named Frederick Kitchen (ON 621). Over the following 31 years at Beaumaris, Frederick Kitchen would launch 38 times, and rescue 46. The Penmon station was subsequently closed on 31 March 1915.

In 1966, the BBC Television programme Blue Peter launched an appeal for 60,000 paperback books, the sale of which would fund a new Inshore lifeboat for the RNLI. Such was the success of the appeal, that four new Blue Peter lifeboats were provided. The programme would eventually fund 28 lifeboats, located around the UK and Northern Ireland.

Beaumaris would receive its first Inshore lifeboat, Blue Peter II (D-127), in 1967. A small boathouse was erected near Victoria Terrace, replaced with a more permanent building nearer the pier in 1975. Further works were carried out to extend the building in 1983 and 1991, and a completely new station was built in 2000.

Blue Peter II (D-127) would serve for seven years, launching 123 times, and saving 45 lives. She would be replaced by a larger B-class (Atlantic 75) lifeboat in 1976, and two further Atlantic type boats, all named Blue Peter II. After her service at Beaumaris, Blue Peter II (D-127) would go on display at Flambards Theme Park, Helston.

In 1991, with a Mersey-class All-weather lifeboat stationed at Llandudno, and a Tyne-class All-weather lifeboat at Moelfre, it was decided to withdraw the All-weather lifeboat at Beaumaris, and close the boathouse and slipway near Tre-Castell Point, which was subsequently demolished. The lifeboat on station at the time, The Robert (ON 955), was retired from service on 7 July 1991.

In 2010, Beaumaris received their latest Inshore lifeboat, an B-class (Atlantic 85) lifeboat, Annette Mary Liddington (B-838), the boat being funded by local donations, and from the bequest of Mr John Grover Liddington, in memory of his mother.

== Station honours ==
The following are awards made at Beaumaris:

- RNIPLS Silver Medal
  David Griffiths, Seaman – 1830
  William Lewis Walker, Collegian – 1831
  William Lewis Walker, Collegian – 1831 (Second-Service Silver Boat) (double award)
  Ralph Williamson, Capt. of yacht Campeadora – 1831
  Ralph Williamson, Capt. of yacht Campeadora – 1831 (Second-Service Silver Boat) (double award)
- RNLI Bronze Medal
  David Walter Gallichan, Coxswain – 1982
- 'The Thanks of the Institution inscribed on Vellum'
  John Charles Askew, Helm – 1976
  David Jones, Helm – 1978
- Vellum Service Certificates
  John Askew, crew member – 1978
  Simon Dubberley, crew member – 1978
  Dr Jack Dubberley, crew member – 1978
- 'A Framed Letter of Thanks signed by the Chairman of the Institution'
  Beaumaris Coxswain and Crew – 1959
  Martin Broughton, crew member – 1998

== Beaumaris lifeboats and tractors ==
=== Pulling and Sailing (P&S) lifeboats ===
ON (Note: ON is the RNLI's Official Number of the boat.)	Name	Built	On station	Class	Comments
271	Tom and Jenny	1890	1891–1896	42-foot self-righting (P&S)	(Note: 42 ft 0 in (12.80 m) x 11 ft 0 in (3.35 m) (12-oared) self-righting (P&S) lifeboat, gift of an anonymous donor "D", built by Forrestt of Limehouse, London, costing £667 when new.); Previously Henry Dundas at St Mary's. Transferred to Rosslare Harbour.

Station Closed 1896–1914

=== Motor lifeboats ===
ON	Name	Built	On station	Class	Comments
621	Frederick Kitchen	1913	1914–1945	43-foot Watson	
846	Field Marshal and Mrs Smuts	1945	1945–1977	46-foot Watson	
921	Greater London II (Civil Service No.30)	1955	1977–1989	46-foot 9in Watson	Previously at Southend-on-Sea
955	The Robert	1960	1989–1991	47-foot Watson	Previously at Broughty Ferry, Baltimore and Lytham St Annes.

All-weather lifeboat withdrawn in 1991
More post-service details can be found on the respective lifeboat class pages.

=== Inshore lifeboats ===
==== D class ====
Op.No. (Note: Op. No. is the RNLI's Operational Number of the boat carried on the hull.)	Name	On station	Class	Comments
D-127	Blue Peter II	1967–1976	D-class (RFD PB16)	On display at Flambards Theme Park, Helston until 2025.

==== B class ====
Op. No.	Name	On station	Class	Comments
B-515	Blue Peter II	1976–1985	B-class (Atlantic 21)	
B-563	Blue Peter II	1985–2000	B-class (Atlantic 21)	
B-768	Blue Peter II	2000–2010	B-class (Atlantic 75)	
B-838	Annette Mary Liddington	2010–	B-class (Atlantic 85)	

=== Launch and recovery tractors ===
Op.No.	Reg. No.	Type	On station	Comments
TW02	LRU 581P	Talus MB-764 County	1976–1987	
TW13	D948 SAW	Talus MB-764 County	1987–1996	
TW08	D508 RUJ	Talus MB-764 County	1996–2000	
TW12	D508 RUJ	Talus MB-764 County	2000–2008	
TW10	VEL 99X	Talus MB-764 County	2008–2010	
TW13	D948 SAW	Talus MB-764 County	2010–2021	
TW12	D508 RUJ	Talus MB-764 County	2021–	

== See also ==
- List of RNLI stations
- List of former RNLI stations
- Royal National Lifeboat Institution lifeboats
- Talus Atlantic 85 DO-DO launch carriage
