= Helvick Head Lifeboat Station =

RNLI Lifeboat station in County Waterford, Ireland

- Stáisiún Bád Tarrthála Ceann Heilbhic
- Flag of the RNLI

- Helvick Head Lifeboat Station in 2026

- Location within Ireland
- Former names: Dungarvan; Dungarvan Bay (Helvick Head); Helvick Head (Dungarvan Bay)

General information
- Type: Lifeboat station
- Location: Cé Heilbhic, Helvick, County Waterford, X35 PW60, Ireland
- Coordinates: 52.0545°N 7.5443°W
- Opened: 1859–1969; 1997–present (ILB)
- Owner: Royal National Lifeboat Institution

Website
- Helvick Head RNLI Lifeboat Station

Helvick Head Lifeboat Station Irish: Stáisiún Bád Tarrthála Ceann Heilbhic can be found on Cé Heilbhic, at the head of the small harbour in Helvick, a village approximately 77 kilometres (48 mi) north east of Cork, at the eastern tip of the Ring Peninsula, sitting on the southern shore and overlooking the entrance of the natural Dungarvan Harbour, in County Waterford, Ireland.

In 1859, a lifeboat was placed at Ballynagaul, also on the southern shore of Dungarvan Harbour, by the Royal National Lifeboat Institution (RNLI). The station was known as Dungarvan Lifeboat Station. After operating from four different locations over a 110-year period, the All-weather lifeboat was withdrawn in 1969, and the station was closed.

Helvick Head Lifeboat Station was re-established as an Inshore lifeboat station in 1997. The RNLI station currently operates a B-class (Atlantic 85) Inshore lifeboat, Robert Armstrong (B-874), on station since 2014.

== History ==
The RNLI opened a lifeboat station on the south coast of Ireland at Ardmore in 1858. The Chief Inspector of Lifeboats visited the area in that summer and recommended three more stations be built along the coast, including one at Dungarvan. In 1859, a 30-foot-long (9.1 m) Peake-class self-righting 'Pulling and Sailing' (P&S) lifeboat, one with sails and six oars, costing £140, was placed at Ballynagaul, a village on the southern shore of Dungarvan Harbour. A transporting and launching carriage costing £51 was also provided, and a boathouse was constructed, at a cost of £129.

On 19 February 1861, the brigantine Susan of Cork was driven ashore and wrecked at Ballinacourty, a village to the north of the entrance to Dungarvan Harbour. The six-oared Dungarvan lifeboat was launched but was unable to provide any assistance. A local 'shore boat' managed to reach the wreck, and saved two of its crew of six. Robert Barron and Capt. Augustine Dower were each awarded the RNLI Silver Medal for this rescue.

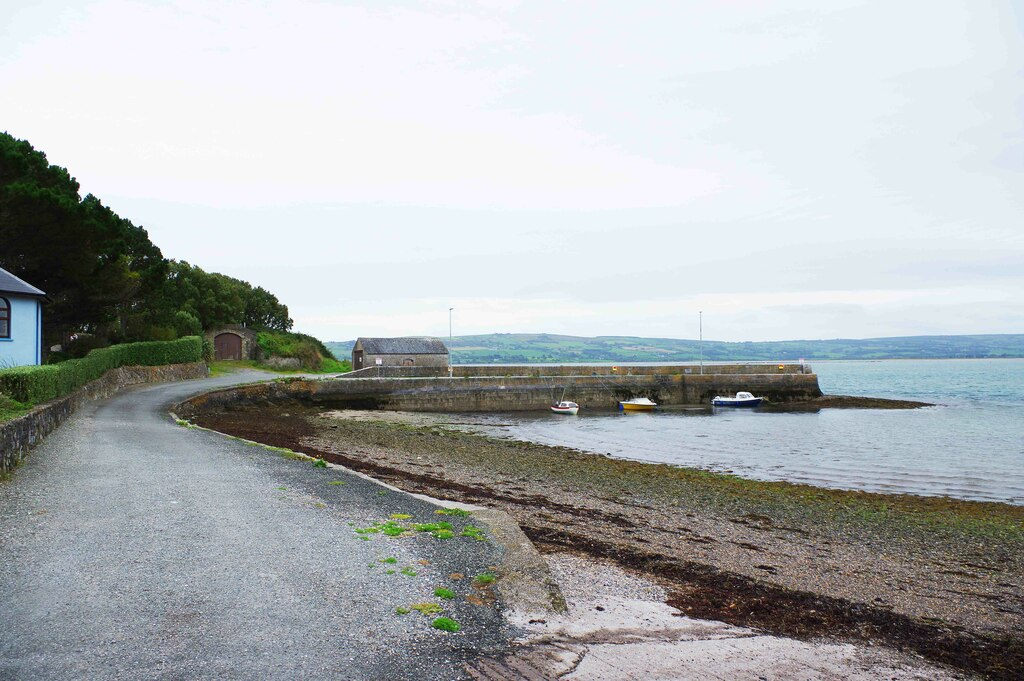
Ballinacourty Boat House

The lifeboat, and boathouse, were subsequently relocated in 1863, to the north side of Dungarvan Harbour, next to the local coastguard station at Ballinacourty.

In 1896, the RNLI committee of management voted £100 to the widow of crew member Michael Hogan, who died on 29 January 1896, and whose death was attributed to exposure on service on 29 December 1895.

The Liverpool ship Moresby was wrecked in a gale on 24 December 1896. The lifeboat managed to rescue seven of the 25 crew, although two of those rescued later died. William Dunville acted as coxswain for the lifeboat that day and was awarded the 'Thanks of the Institution inscribed on Vellum'.

At a meeting of the RNLI committee of management on 8 December 1898, it was decided to establish a new station, back on the southern shore of Dungarvan Harbour. A location was chosen at Crow's Point, at Helvick, just 1 mile (1.6 km) to the east of the original station at Ballynagaul. Once operational, the station at Ballinacourty was closed.

The 1899 boathouse at Helvick was described as being "at road-level … a kind of hanger built out over the water on stilts". The lifeboat was kept in a cradle on rails, which ran from the boathouse down the slipway. The new station with its slipway cost £1,800, and was ready in 1899. It was officially called Dungarvan Bay (Helvick Head) Lifeboat Station.

Following completion of the new boathouse, a new 40-foot Watson-class lifeboat, James Stevens No. 16 (ON 445) was placed on service in 1900. Just three years later, the station named changed again, to Helvick Head (Dungarvan Bay) Lifeboat Station.

== Motor lifeboats and closure ==
James Stevens No. 16 was the last P&S lifeboat to be placed at Helvick Head, and served the station for 30 years, launching 30 times, and saving 12 lives. In 1930, the station was assigned a motor-powered lifeboat. Elsie (ON 648) was a 45-foot Watson-class lifeboat, built in 1919, with a 60-hp Tylor engine, and had previously served at St Mary's on the Isles of Scilly. As the lifeboat was moored in the harbour at Helvick, the 1899 boathouse was demolished.

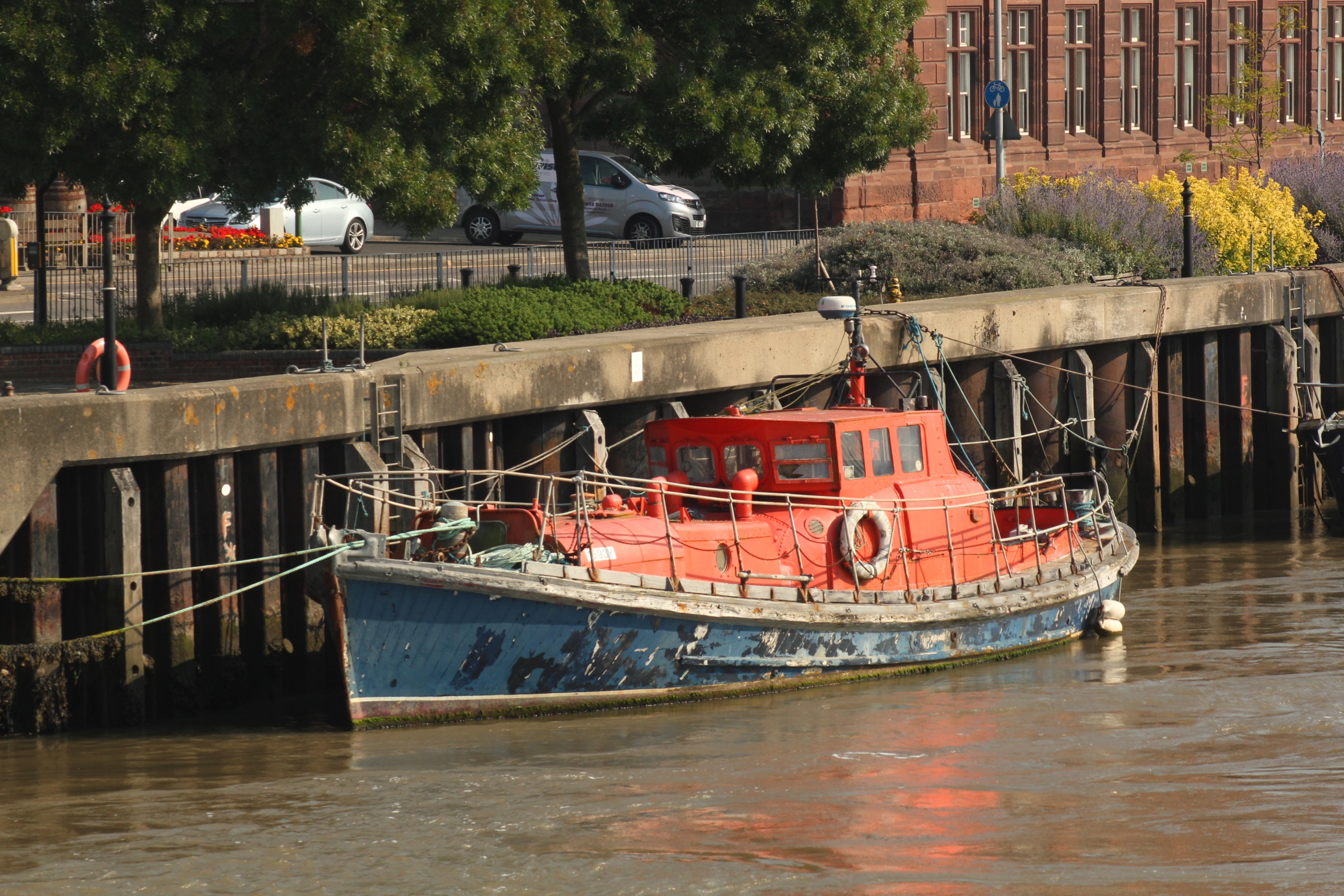
John and Lucy Cordingley (ON 868)

Reported in the March 1969 edition of the RNLI journal 'The Life-boat', a review of operational requirements brought about the closure of two stations in the Irish Republic. Helvick Head was to close after 110 years service, along with a second station at Fenit, as there was "no longer an operational justification for either of the life-boats."

The lifeboat on station at the time of closure, the 46-foot 9in Watson-class John and Lucy Cordingley (ON 868), at Helvick Head since 1960, launching 19 times and saving 12 lives, was initially transferred to the relief fleet, and ultimately sold from service in 1981.

== 1995 onwards ==
Subject to successful launch and recovery trials, a meeting of the RNLI executive committee on 28 June 1995 decided to re-establish the lifeboat station at Helvick Head, operating a B-class (Atlantic 21) Inshore lifeboat. The station would be known as Helvick Head Lifeboat Station.

The station was formally established on 26 April 1997, with the arrival of former Peel lifeboat (B-536) from the relief fleet.

At 20:00 on 1 July 1999, a 4.5 m (15 ft) fibreglass boat Realt Or set out from Dungarvan on a fishing trip. Aboard were four men, a young boy, only two life-jackets, and a VHF marine radio that nobody knew how to use. A distress call via mobile phone was received after dense fog descended, and the men found themselves lost and disorientated. The Helvick Head lifeboat was tasked, but had no radar on board. To assist with the incident, Rescue 111 was tasked, a brand new Dauphin DH248 helicopter which had only entered service that day. The Ballycotton All-weather lifeboat, with radar, was also tasked, but at 22:58, the boat was found, and the Helvick Head lifeboat set up a tow to bring them home. In the early hours of 2 July, struggling to land in the dense fog, Rescue 111 crashed, with the loss of all four crew members.

After a succession of four Atlantic 21 lifeboats, the station would finally received their permanent lifeboat, the B-class (Atlantic 75) Alice & Charles (B-760), on 14 December 1999, funded from the bequest of Charles William Armstrong. The arrival coincided with the completion of permanent shore facilities.

A service of dedication and naming ceremony was held on Helvick Pier at 11:00 on Saturday 30 August 2014, when the new B-class (Atlantic 85) Helvick Head lifeboat, costing €255,000, was named Robert Armstrong (B-874). The lifeboat was funded from the bequest of Mr Robert David Armstrong who died in 2009, a resident of Blackheath, London, but who enjoyed time on his boat on the Norfolk Broads. It was Mr Armstrong's aunt Alice, along with her brother Charles, who had funded the previous lifeboat at Helvick Head.

== Area of operation ==
The Inshore lifeboat at Helvick Head has a range of three hours and a top speed of 35 kn (65 km/h). Adjacent inshore lifeboats are at Tramore to the east, and Youghal to the west. The nearest all-weather lifeboat is stationed at Dunmore East.

== Station honours ==
The following awards have been made at Dungarvan / Helvick Head:

- RNLI Silver Medal
  Robert N. Barron – 1861
  Capt. Augustine Dower, Master Mariner – 1861
- 'The Thanks of the Institution inscribed on Vellum'
  William Dunville, Acting Coxswain – 1896

== Roll of honour ==
In memory of those lost whilst serving at Dungarvan / Helvick Head:

- Eight of the nine crew drowned, when a shore boat capsized, returning home after going to the assistance of the brig Harry King, 24 April 1852.

Thomas Crawford
Capt. Maurice Duggan
Laurence Lenihan
John Maher

Thomas McNamara
Maurice Mulcahy
Michael Raher
John Whelan

- Death attributed to the effects of exposure, following a call on 29 December 1895
  Michael Hogan, crew member
- Lost in the crash of helicopter Rescue 111, 2 July 1999
  Capt. David 'Dave' O'Flaherty (30)
  Capt. Michael 'Mick' Baker, co-pilot (28)
  Sergeant Patrick 'Pat' Mooney, winch operator (34)
  Cpl. Niall Byrne, winchman (25)

== Dungarvan and Helvick Head lifeboats ==
The first lifeboat at Dungarvan was a small, six-oared boat. While it managed several rescues, it was too small and underpowered in some weather and so a larger, ten-oared, boat was provided from 1871. These early lifeboats also had sails, but from 1930 a motor lifeboat was provided. The first had a single auxiliary engine but from 1946 they had two engines.

Since the station reopened in 1997 it has been equipped with a B-class inshore lifeboat.

=== Pulling and Sailing (P&S) lifeboats ===
On station	ON (Note: ON is the RNLI's Official Number of the boat.)	Name	Built	Class	Comments
1859–1869	Pre-341	Unnamed	1859	30-foot Peake self-righting (P&S)	(Note: 30 ft 0 in (9.14 m) x 6 ft 3 in (1.91 m) (6-oared) Peake-class self-righting (P&S) lifeboat, funded by the RNLI, built by Forrestt of Limehouse, London, costing £140.); Named Christopher Ludlow in 1869.
1869–1871	Pre-341	Christopher Ludlow	1859	30-foot Peake self-righting (P&S)	(Note: Funded by the Trustees of the late Dr C. Ludlow.); Returned to London and broken up in 1871.
1871–1887	Pre-557	Christopher Ludlow	1871	30-foot Prowse self-righting (P&S)	(Note: 32 ft 0 in (9.75 m) x 7 ft 8 in (2.34 m) (10-oared) Prowse-class self-righting (P&S) lifeboat, gift of the Trustees of the late Dr C. Ludlow, built by Forrestt of Limehouse, London, costing £245.); Broken up in 1887.
1887–1900	104	William Dunville	1887	34-foot self-righting (P&S)	(Note: 34 ft 0 in (10.36 m) x 7 ft 6 in (2.29 m) (10-oared) self-righting (P&S) lifeboat, gift of Mrs A. G. Dunville of London, built by Woolfe of Shadwell, London, costing £354.); Broken up on 1900.
1900–1930	445	James Stevens No. 16	1900	40-foot Watson (P&S)	(Note: 40 ft 0 in (12.19 m) x 11 ft 0 in (3.35 m) (12-oared) Watson-class non-self-righting (P&S) lifeboat, legacy of Mr J. Stevens of Birmingham, built by Thames Ironworks of Blackwall, London, costing £1,336.); Sold in 1930. Last reported as a yacht at St Helier, Channel Islands, 1972.

Pre ON numbers are unofficial numbers used by the Lifeboat Enthusiast Society to reference early lifeboats not included on the official RNLI list.

=== Motor lifeboats ===
On station	ON	Name	Built	Class	Comments
1930–1946	648	Elsie	1919	45-foot Watson	First stationed at St Mary's. Sold in 1951. Renamed as the yacht Happy Return. Last seen in Tahiti in 1960.
1946–1960	777	H. F. Bailey	1935	46-foot Watson	First stationed at Cromer. Sold in 1973. On display at the Henry Blogg Museum at Cromer, (In storage during renovations, September 2024).
1960–1969	868	John and Lucy Cordingley	1949	46-foot 9in Watson	First stationed at Teesmouth. Sold in 1981. Named Tempo at Hall Quay, Great Yarmouth, June 2024

More post-service details can be found on the respective lifeboat class pages.

=== Inshore lifeboats ===
==== B-Class ====
On station	Op.No. (Note: Op.No. is the RNLI's Operational Number of the boat carried on the hull.)	Name	Class	Comments
1997	B-536	Unnamed	B-class (Atlantic 21)	First stationed at Peel in 1976.
1997–1998	B-569	Unnamed	B-class (Atlantic 21)	First stationed at Portaferry in 1986, as Blue Peter V.
1998	B-528	Unnamed	B-class (Atlantic 21)	First deployed as a relief lifeboat in 1975.
1998–1999	B-553	Kirklees	B-class (Atlantic 21)	First stationed at Newbiggin in 1982.
1999–2013	B-760	Alice and Charles	B-class (Atlantic 75)	
2013–2014	B-753	City of Bradford V	B-class (Atlantic 75)	First deployed as a relief lifeboat in 1999.
2014–	B-874	Robert Armstrong	B-class (Atlantic 85)	

== See also ==
- List of RNLI stations
- List of former RNLI stations
- Royal National Lifeboat Institution lifeboats

== Sources ==
- Leonard, Richie; Denton, Tony (2025). Lifeboat Enthusiasts Handbook 2025. Lifeboats Enthusiasts' Society.
- Leonard, Richie; Denton, Tony (2026). Lifeboat Enthusiasts Handbook 2026. Lifeboats Enthusiasts' Society.
