= Queenstown Lifeboat Station =

Former RNLI lifeboat station in County Cork, Ireland

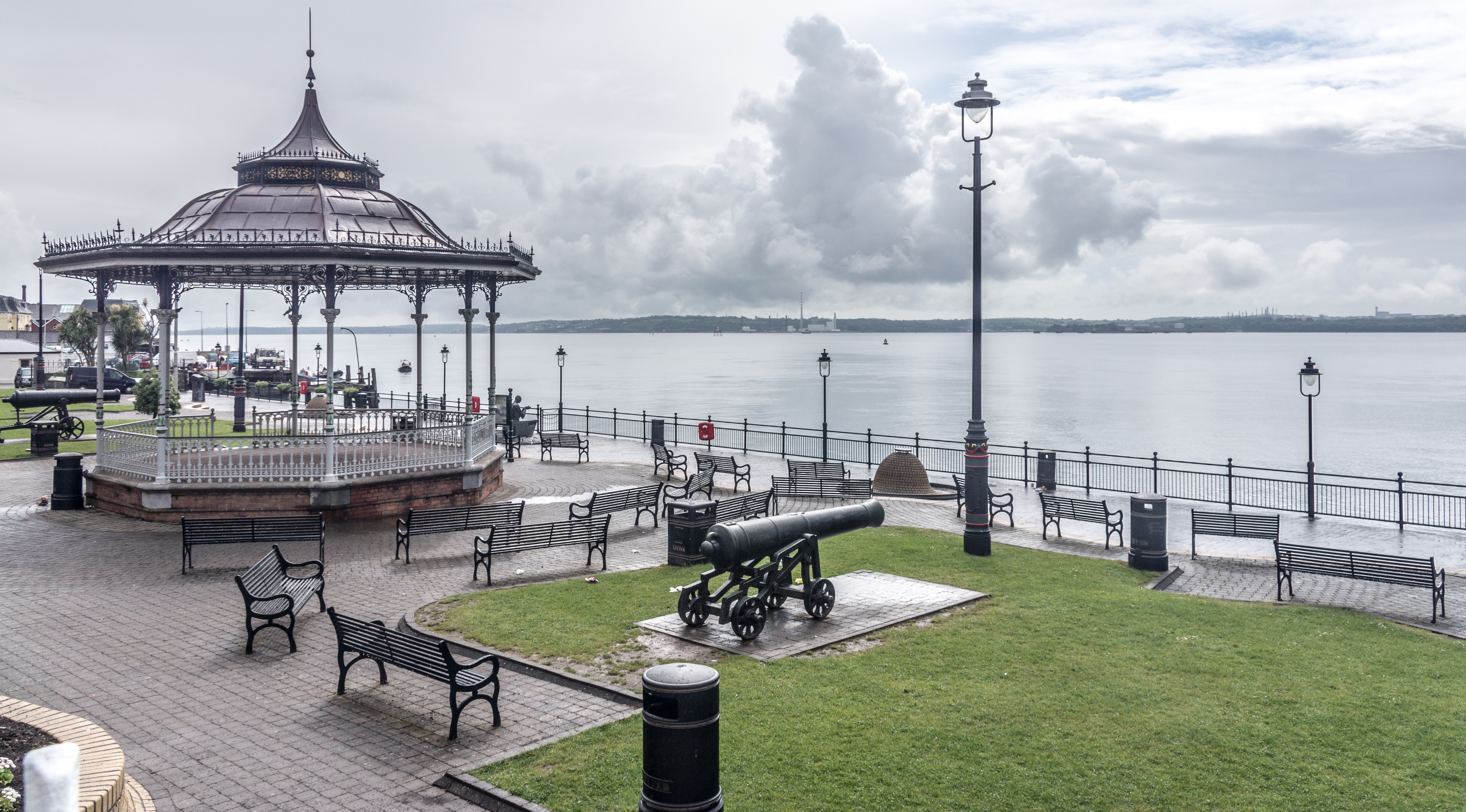
- Cobh Promenade, Co. Cork

- Cobh, County Cork

General information
- Status: Closed
- Type: RNLI Lifeboat Station
- Location: The Mall, Carrignafoy, Cobh, County Cork, Ireland
- Coordinates: 51°51′06.5″N 8°16′42.8″W
- Opened: 22 October 1866
- Closed: 1920
- Owner: Irish Scout Association

Queenstown Lifeboat Station was located in the seaport town of Cobh, (known as Queenstown between 1849 and 1920), situated to the east of the small Pilots Jetty, just off The Mall, overlooking Cork Harbour, on the south coast of Ireland.

A lifeboat station was first established at Queenstown in 1866 by the Royal National Lifeboat Institution (RNLI).

After 54 years in operation, Queenstown Lifeboat Station was closed in 1920.

== History ==
Ever since its founding in 1824, the Royal National Institution for the Preservation of Life from Shipwreck (RNIPLS), later to become the RNLI in 1854, would award medals for deeds of gallantry at sea, even if no lifeboats were involved.

On 27 January 1861, the Austrian brig Uredon, on passage from Cardiff to Malta, ran onto the rocks at Guileen (Gyleen), having missed the entrance to Cork Harbour. 12 of the 13 crew were saved by the Queenstown Coastguard rocket apparatus. Two RNLI Silver Medals were awarded.

A third RNLI Silver Medal would be awarded in 1866, when six men in the coastguard galley saved the 13 crew of the Italian barque Lidia, when she was wrecked in a gale at Roberts Cove.

A donation of £1878-1s-11d was reported at the meeting of the RNLI committee of management on 8 April 1866, to be known as The Quiver Lifeboat Fund, contributed by the subscribers to The Quiver magazine, via the publishers Cassell, Petter and Galpin, and the editor, the Rev. Thomas Teignmouth Shore. The donation initially funded three lifeboats, Quiver No.1 for Queenstown, Quiver No.2 for Margate, and Quiver No.3 for Southwold. It would transpire that No.1 was actually placed at Margate, No.2 at Southwold, and No.3 went to Queenstown.

A meeting on 3 May 1866 acknowledged the letter and grant by the Secretary of State for War, of the site for a lifeboat house at Queenstown, the building later reported as costing £218-7s-4d.

In view of the number of transatlantic vessels using the port, and with several wrecks with loss of life having occurred in the vicinity of Cork Harbour, "it was thought desirable to form a life-boat establishment at Queenstown in the harbour, where at all times and in all weathers the boat could be launched and manned by an efficient crew, and where steam-tugs would be always available to tow her to any part of the neighbouring coast where her services might be needed."

A 34-foot (10 m) self-righting 'Pulling and Sailing' (P&S) lifeboat, one with sails and (10) oars, was conveyed free of charge from the River Thames to Cork, by the Cork Steamship Company. On 22 October 1866, in front of "an immense assemblage of spectators", the lifeboat was named Quiver No.3 (ON 302), and then launched on demonstration.

An additional lifeboat was placed at Queenstown in 1890. The 'Queenstown No.2', at 42-feet-long, was at the time, one of the largest self-righting P&S lifeboats constructed, and would be moored afloat at the station. The boat was funded from the bequest of the late Miss Ann Ball of London, and in accordance with her wishes, named Endeavour (ON 272). Both boats would serve at Queenstown until 1899, when Quiver No. 3, at 33-years-old, was retired.

Endeavour was only on station at Queenstown for a further 2 years, before she too was retired, at only 11-years-old. She was replaced by the James Stevens No. 20, a 43-foot Watson (P&S) lifeboat, the last of 20 lifeboats funded by a legacy of £50,000 of the late Mr James Stevens, a property developer from Birmingham. This donation provided more lifeboats than any other single donation ever received by the RNLI.

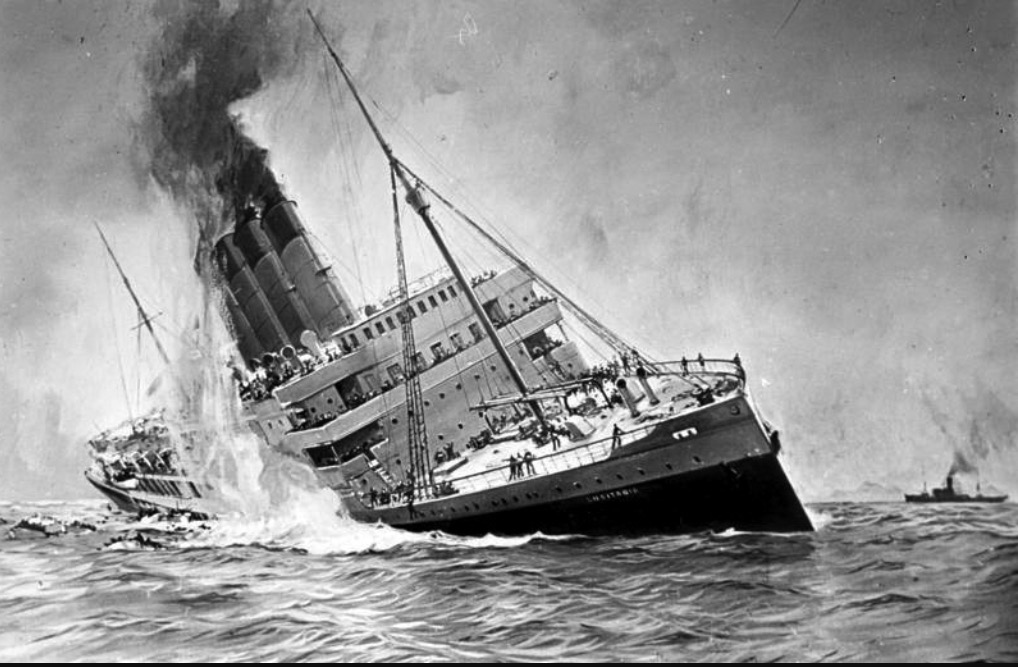
Sinking of RMS Lusitania

At 14:10 on the fine calm day of 7 May 1915, the ocean liner RMS Lusitania was torpedoed off the Old Head of Kinsale by German submarine U-20. She sank in just 18 minutes, with the loss of 1197 passengers and crew. The mayday call was received by Queenstown Coastguard at 14:15, and all available vessels were dispatched. The Queenstown lifeboat James Stevens No. 20 was towed to the scene by a tugboat, and was instrumental in picking up survivors, and transferring passengers from ship's lifeboats to larger vessels.

At a meeting of the RNLI committee of management on Friday 9 January 1920, it was decided to close both the Groomsport and Queenstown Life-boat Stations.

Queenstown, renamed in 1849 to commemorate the visit of Queen Victoria, reverted to its original name "Cove" in 1921, but this time took the Irish form Cobh. The lifeboat station still remains, much modernised, and is now the Cobh Sea Scouts headquarters.

The lifeboat on station at the time of closure, James Stevens No. 20 (ON 457), would later serve at Fenit in 1923. She was sold from service in 1928, and was last reported as a yacht Eternal Wave in Dartmouth, Devon in the 1970s.

== Station honours ==
The following are awards made at Queenstown:

- RNLI Silver Medal

Lt. Thomas Goss, RN, Inspecting Commander, H.M. Coastguard, Queenstown – 1861
John Stark, Chief Boatman, H.M. Coastguard, Queenstown – 1861

William Taylor, Chief Officer, H.M. Coastguard, Robert's Cove – 1866

- The Thanks of the Institution inscribed on Vellum

J. Smart, Chief Officer – 1889
R. Cox, Second Officer – 1889
both of the ship Argomene, of Liverpool

== Queenstown lifeboats ==
=== Pulling and Sailing (P&S) lifeboats ===
ON (Note: ON is the RNLI's Official Number of the boat.)	Name	Built	On station	Class	Comments
302	Quiver No. 3	1866	1866–1899	34-foot Self-righting (P&S)	(Note: 34-foot x 8-foot 3in (10-oared) self-righting (P&S) lifeboat, gift of The Quiver magazine LB fund, built by Forrestt of Limehouse, London, costing £301.)
272	Endeavour	1890	1899–1901	42-foot Self-righting (P&S)	
457	James Stevens No. 20	1901	1901–1920	43-foot Watson (P&S)	(Note: 43-foot x 12-foot 3in (10-oared) Watson-class non-self-righting (P&S) lifeboat, legacy of Mt J. Stevens of Birmingham, built by Thames Ironworks of Blackwall, London, costing £1,739.)

Station Closed, 1920

==== Queenstown No. 2 lifeboat ====
ON	Name	Built	On station	Class	Comments
272	Endeavour	1890	1890–1899	42-foot Self-righting (P&S)	(Note: 42-foot x 11-foot (12-oared) self-righting (P&S) lifeboat, gift of the late Mrs A. Ball of London, Forrestt of Limehouse, London, costing £667.)

Station closed, 1901

== See also ==
- List of RNLI stations
- List of former RNLI stations
- Royal National Lifeboat Institution lifeboats
