= James Stevens lifeboats =

British lifeboats

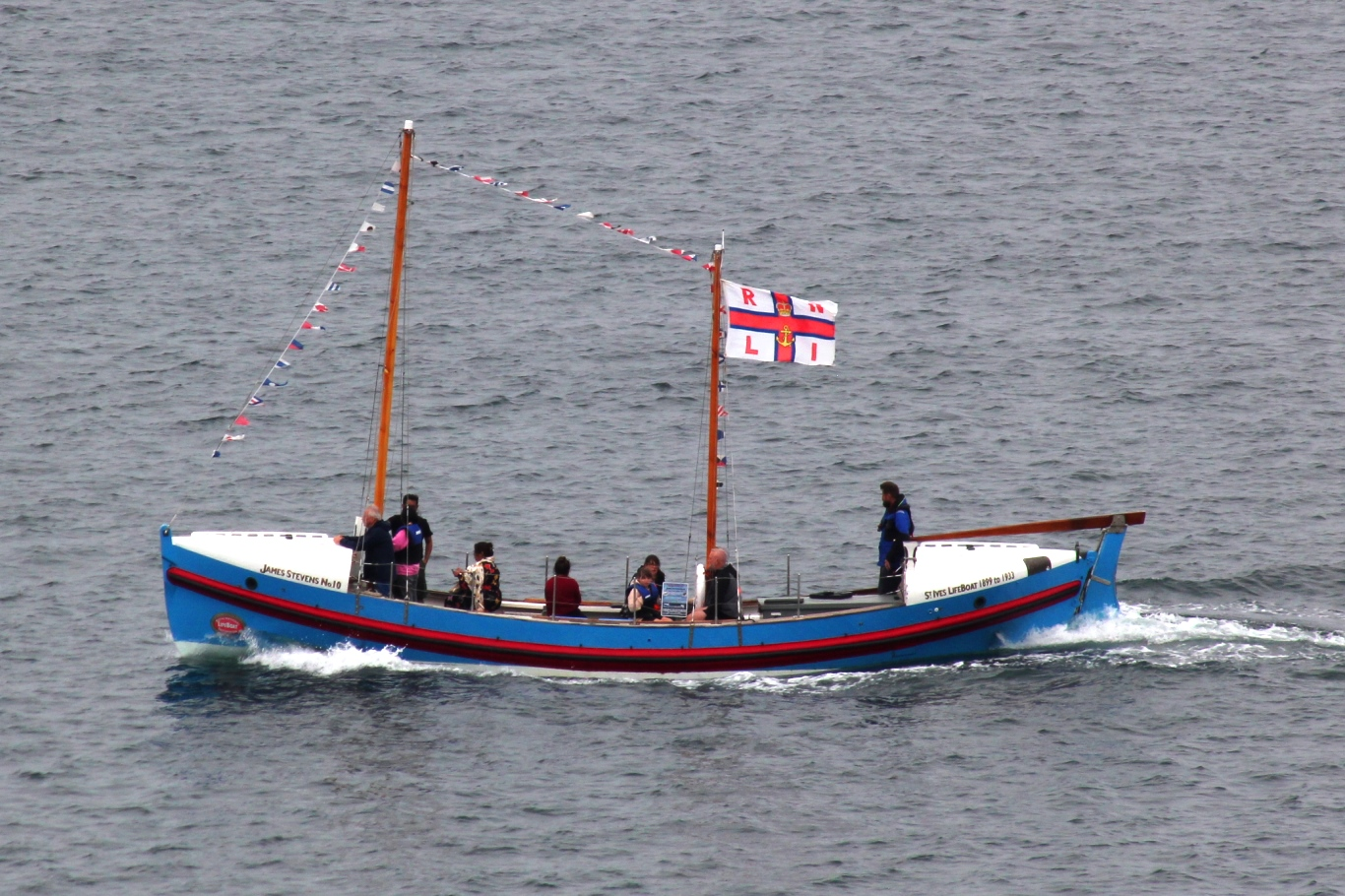
RNLB James Stevens No. 10

The James Stevens lifeboats were a series of twenty lifeboats which were purchased by the Royal National Lifeboat Institution (RNLI) using a legacy received in 1894 from the estate of Mr James Stevens. It is the largest number of RNLI lifeboats funded from a single donation.

== James Stevens' legacy ==
The RNLI received a £50,000 legacy in 1894 (equivalent to £5,619,000 in 2025) from the estate of Mr James Stevens, a developer, from Edgbaston in Birmingham. This donation provided more lifeboats than any other single donation received by the RNLI.

The 20 lifeboats were built between 1896 and 1901, during which time they accounted for 22% of the 90 lifeboats built:

Year	James Stevens' legacy	Other new lifeboats
1896	1	12
1897	0	10
1898	2	9
1899	8	7
1900	6	11
1901	3	21
Total	20	70

== Lifeboats ==
James Stevens No. 1 entered service in 1896, followed by the other 19 between 1898 and 1901. They were built to several different designs and sizes to suit the needs of their stations. James Stevens No. 4, James Stevens No. 5 and James Stevens No. 13 were all lost in service between 1900 and 1917, the remainder being withdrawn between 1917 and 1933.

As was usual at this time, most were 'pulling and sailing' (P&S) lifeboats, provided with oars but also fitted with sails for when conditions allowed their use. James Stevens No. 3 and James Stevens No. 4 were both built with steam engines, while James Stevens No. 14 was fitted with a petrol engine in 1906.

Two of the lifeboats, James Stevens No. 10 and James Stevens No. 14 have been restored and are kept in the towns where they were stationed.

ON (Note: ON is the RNLI's Official Number of the boat.)	Name	Class	In service	Station	Comments
401	James Stevens No. 1	35-foot Self-Righting (P&S)	1896–1917	Port St Mary	(Note: 35 ft 0 in (10.67 m) x 8 ft 6 in (2.59 m) (10-oared) self-righting (P&S) lifeboat, built by Thames Ironworks of Blackwall, London, costing £463.); Launched on 22 services, saving 55 lives. Sold 1917. Renamed Nordcapp Viking. Last reported damaged at Cobbs Quay, Poole, August 1979.
413	James Stevens No. 2	35-foot Liverpool (P&S)	1898–1912	Campbeltown	(Note: 35 ft 0 in (10.67 m) x 10 ft 0 in (3.05 m) (12-oared) Liverpool-class non-self-righting (P&S) lifeboat, built by Reynolds of Lowestoft, costing £538.); In 1900 it was accidentally dropped 14 ft (4.3 m) into the water. It was badly damaged when it was washed onto a ship whilst on service, on 28 December 1908.
413	Reserve No. 9A	35-foot Liverpool (P&S)	1912–1914	Reserve fleet	Transferred to the Reserve fleet in 1912.
413	Reserve No. 9A	35-foot Liverpool (P&S)	1914–1924	Hilbre Island	Launched on service a total of 30 times, saving 49 lives. Sold 1924.
420	James Stevens No. 3	Steam	1898–1903	Grimsby	(Note: 56 ft 6 in (17.22 m) x 15 ft 9 in (4.80 m) Steam-class lifeboat, with 180-hp compound engine, built by J. Samuel White of Cowes, costing £3,298.); This was one of the RNLI's six steam lifeboats and the first to have a propeller. Launched on service a total of 86 times, saving 54 lives. Sold 1929. Renamed Helga. Lost off Porthdinllaen in 1935.
420	James Stevens No. 3	Steam	1903–1908	Gorleston	This was one of the RNLI's six steam lifeboats and the first to have a propeller. Launched on service a total of 86 times, saving 54 lives. Sold 1929. Renamed Helga. Lost off Porthdinllaen in 1935.
420	James Stevens No. 3	Steam	1908–1915	Angle	This was one of the RNLI's six steam lifeboats and the first to have a propeller. Launched on service a total of 86 times, saving 54 lives. Sold 1929. Renamed Helga. Lost off Porthdinllaen in 1935.
420	James Stevens No. 3	Steam	1915–1919	Totland Bay	This was one of the RNLI's six steam lifeboats and the first to have a propeller. Launched on service a total of 86 times, saving 54 lives. Sold 1929. Renamed Helga. Lost off Porthdinllaen in 1935.
420	James Stevens No. 3	Steam	1919–1922	Dover	This was one of the RNLI's six steam lifeboats and the first to have a propeller. Launched on service a total of 86 times, saving 54 lives. Sold 1929. Renamed Helga. Lost off Porthdinllaen in 1935.
420	James Stevens No. 3	Steam	1922–1928	Holyhead	This was one of the RNLI's six steam lifeboats and the first to have a propeller. Launched on service a total of 86 times, saving 54 lives. Sold 1929. Renamed Helga. Lost off Porthdinllaen in 1935.
421	James Stevens No. 4	Steam	1899–1900	Padstow	(Note: 56 ft 6 in (17.22 m) x 15 ft 9 in (4.80 m) Steam-class lifeboat, with 180-hp compound engine, built by J. Samuel White of Cowes, costing £3,340.); Launched on service four times, saving nine lives. Wrecked on service, 11 April 1900, after just over one year on station; eight of her crew of eleven drowned.
426	James Stevens No. 5	35-foot Self-Righting (P&S)	1899–1917	Newquay	(Note: 35 ft 0 in (10.67 m) x 8 ft 6 in (2.59 m) (10-oared) self-righting (P&S) lifeboat, built by Roberts of Mevagissey, costing £613.); Capsized during practice with the loss of one crew member, March 1908. Wrecked on service to the steamship Osten, although the crew managed to get ashore, 17 December 1917. The remains were found submerged near the Towan Head slipway in 2004. Launched 15 times on service, saving 26 lives.
427	James Stevens No. 6	35-foot Self-Righting (P&S)	1898–1924	Eastbourne	(Note: 35 ft 0 in (10.67 m) x 8 ft 6 in (2.59 m) (10-oared) self-righting (P&S) lifeboat, built by Roberts of Mevagissey, costing £612.); Launched on service 43 times, saving 34 lives. Retained for exhibition purposes after service. Sold 1936. Renamed Golden City. Broken up at Eastbourne in 1948.
427	Reserve No. D16	35-foot Self-Righting (P&S)	1924–1935	Eastbourne	Launched on service 43 times, saving 34 lives. Retained for exhibition purposes after service. Sold 1936. Renamed Golden City. Broken up at Eastbourne in 1948.
429	James Stevens No. 7	45-foot Watson (P&S)	1899–1926	Howth	(Note: 45 ft 0 in (13.72 m) x 12 ft 6 in (3.81 m) (10-oared) Watson-class non-self-righting (P&S) lifeboat, built by Thames Ironworks of Blackwall, London, costing £1,096.); Launched 10 times, saving 8 lives. Sold 1926.
425	James Stevens No. 8	35-foot Liverpool (P&S)	1899–1913	Ardrossan	(Note: 35 ft 0 in (10.67 m) x 10 ft 9 in (3.28 m) (10/12-oared) Liverpool-class non-self-righting (P&S) lifeboat, built by James Beeching of Great Yarmouth, costing £544.); Launched 7 times at Ardrossan, saving 41 lives.
425	Reserve No. 9B	35-foot Liverpool (P&S)	1913–1916	Wells-next-the-Sea	Transferred to the Reserve fleet in 1913. Sold 1920.
425	Reserve No. 9B	35-foot Liverpool (P&S)	1916–1920	Reserve fleet	Transferred to the Reserve fleet in 1913. Sold 1920.
430	James Stevens No. 9	38-foot Norfolk and Suffolk (P&S)	1899–1923	Southend-on-Sea	(Note: 38 ft 0 in (11.58 m) x 12 ft 0 in (3.66 m) (12-oared) Norfolk and Suffolk-class non-self-righting (P&S) lifeboat, built by Thames Ironworks of Blackwall, London, costing £865.); Launched 111 times, saving 94 lives. Sold 1923. Renamed Viking. Destroyed by a World War II bomb at Dover in 1940.
435	James Stevens No. 10	37-foot Self-Righting (P&S)	1900–1933	St Ives	(Note: 37 ft 0 in (11.28 m) x 9 ft 3 in (2.82 m) (12-oared) self-righting (P&S) lifeboat, built by Thames Ironworks of Blackwall, London, costing £834.); Launched 59 times, saving 227 lives. Sold 1933. Renamed Patricia Mary. Now used for boat-trips at St Ives but was sunk in the Hayle Estuary on 30 December 2015 before being salvaged and restored.
438	James Stevens No. 11	35-foot Self-Righting (P&S)	1900-1912	New Romney	(Note: 35 ft 0 in (10.67 m) x 8 ft 6 in (2.59 m) (10-oared) self-righting (P&S) lifeboat, built by Thames Ironworks of Blackwall, London, costing £823.); Launched 16 times, saving 12 lives. Sold 1928.
438	Reserve No. 6	35-foot Self-Righting (P&S)	1912–1914	Reserve fleet	Launched 16 times, saving 12 lives. Sold 1928.
438	Reserve No. 6	35-foot Self-Righting (P&S)	1914–1920	Angle	Launched 16 times, saving 12 lives. Sold 1928.
438	Reserve No. 6	35-foot Self-Righting (P&S)	1920–1921	Reserve fleet	Launched 16 times, saving 12 lives. Sold 1928.
438	James Stevens No. 11	35-foot Self-Righting (P&S)	1921–1928	Johnshaven	Launched 16 times, saving 12 lives. Sold 1928.
436	James Stevens No. 12	35-foot Self-Righting (P&S)	1900–1903	The Mumbles	(Note: 35 ft 0 in (10.67 m) x 8 ft 6 in (2.59 m) (10-oared) self-righting (P&S) lifeboat, built by Thames Ironworks of Blackwall, London, costing £765.); Launched four times on service, saving seven lives. Wrecked on service, with the loss of six crew, 1 February 1903.
439	James Stevens No. 13	35-foot Self-Righting (P&S)	1900–1925	Arbroath	(Note: 35 ft 0 in (10.67 m) x 8 ft 6 in (2.59 m) (10-oared) self-righting (P&S) lifeboat, built by Thames Ironworks of Blackwall, London, costing £738.); Launched 44 times, saving 12 lives. Sold after being damaged, 1925.
432	James Stevens No. 14	43-foot Norfolk and Suffolk (P&S)	1900–1928	Walton and Frinton	(Note: 43 ft 0 in (13.11 m) x 12 ft 6 in (3.81 m) (12-oared) Norfolk and Suffolk-class non-self-righting (P&S) lifeboat, built by Thames Ironworks of Blackwall, London, costing £1,420. Fitted with a 40-hp Brooke petrol engine in 1906.); Launched 126 times, saving 227 lives. Sold 1928, renamed Mardee. By the late 1970s it had lost its engine and become a houseboat. It was returned to Walton-on-the-Naze for preservation in 1998. Stored ashore at Titchmarch Marina, August 2025.
442	James Stevens No. 15	40-foot Watson (P&S)	1900–1921	Wexford	(Note: 40 ft 0 in (12.19 m) x 10 ft 0 in (3.05 m) (12-oared) Watson-class non-self-righting (P&S) lifeboat, built by Thames Ironworks of Blackwall, London, costing £1,295.); Launched 57 times, saving 124 lives. Sold 1921.
445	James Stevens No. 16	40-foot Watson (P&S)	1900–1930	Helvick Head	(Note: 40 ft 0 in (12.19 m) x 11 ft 0 in (3.35 m) (12-oared) Watson-class non-self-righting (P&S) lifeboat, built by Thames Ironworks of Blackwall, London, costing £1,295.); Launched 30 times, saving 12 lives. Sold in 1930, renamed Helvick Head. Last reported as a yacht at St Helier, January 1972.
451	James Stevens No. 17	35-foot Liverpool (P&S)	1900–1922	Porthoustock	(Note: 36 ft 0 in (10.97 m) x 9 ft 0 in (2.74 m) (12-oared) Liverpool-class non-self-righting (P&S) lifeboat, built by Thames Ironworks of Blackwall, London, costing £773.); Launched nine times, saving eight lives. Sold 1922, renamed Salvor II.
452	James Stevens No. 18	35-foot Liverpool (P&S)	1901–1931	Girvan	(Note: 35 ft 0 in (10.67 m) x 10 ft 0 in (3.05 m) (12-oared) Liverpool-class non-self-righting (P&S) lifeboat, built by Thames Ironworks of Blackwall, London, costing £938.); Launched 19 times, saving 29 lives. Sold 1931.
459	James Stevens No. 19	35-foot Dungeness (Rubie) Self-Righting (P&S)	1901–1926	Newburgh	(Note: 34 ft 0 in (10.36 m) x 8 ft 0 in (2.44 m) (10-oared) Dungeness-class (Rubie) non-self-righting (P&S) lifeboat, built by Thames Ironworks of Blackwall, London, costing £672.); Launched to the Aberdeen trawler Imperial Prince, resulting in the crew being awarded two silver and a bronze RNLI medals for bravery. Launched 18 times, saving 53 lives. Sold 1928, renamed Madgeric. Last reported as a yacht at Wisbech, 1970.
459	James Stevens No. 19	35-foot Dungeness (Rubie) Self-Righting (P&S)	1926–1928	Reserve fleet	Launched to the Aberdeen trawler Imperial Prince, resulting in the crew being awarded two silver and a bronze RNLI medals for bravery. Launched 18 times, saving 53 lives. Sold 1928, renamed Madgeric. Last reported as a yacht at Wisbech, 1970.
457	James Stevens No. 20	43-foot Watson (P&S)	1901–1920	Queenstown	(Note: 43 ft 0 in (13.11 m) x 12 ft 3 in (3.73 m) (12-oared) Watson-class non-self-righting (P&S) lifeboat, built by Thames Ironworks of Blackwall, London, costing £1,739.); Launched seven times, saving three lives. Sold 1928, renamed Eternal Wave. Last reported as a yacht at Dartmouth, Devon, 1970s.
457	James Stevens No. 20	43-foot Watson (P&S)	1920–1923	Reserve No. 7B	Launched seven times, saving three lives. Sold 1928, renamed Eternal Wave. Last reported as a yacht at Dartmouth, Devon, 1970s.
457	James Stevens No. 20	43-foot Watson (P&S)	1923–1928	Fenit (Tralee Bay)	Launched seven times, saving three lives. Sold 1928, renamed Eternal Wave. Last reported as a yacht at Dartmouth, Devon, 1970s.

== See also ==
- List of RNLI stations
- List of former RNLI stations
- Royal National Lifeboat Institution lifeboats
