= Stromness Lifeboat Station =

RNLI lifeboat station in Orkney, Scotland

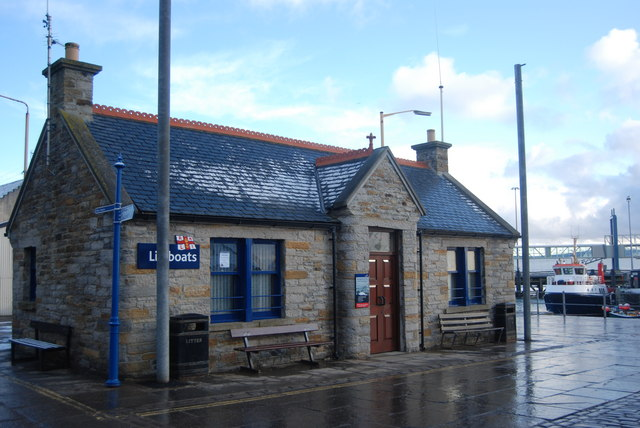
- Stromness Lifeboat Station

- Location within Orkney Islands

General information
- Type: RNLI Lifeboat Station
- Location: The Lifeboat House, 16 Victoria Street, Stromness, Orkney, KW16 3AA, Scotland
- Coordinates: 58°57′48.0″N 3°17′51.8″W
- Opened: 1867
- Owner: Royal National Lifeboat Institution

Website
- Stromness RNLI Lifeboat Station

Stromness Lifeboat Station is located in the harbour town of Stromness, the second largest town of Mainland, Orkney, in the Isles of Orkney, Scotland.

A lifeboat was first stationed at Stromness by the Royal National Lifeboat Institution (RNLI) in 1867.

Stromness Severn-class ALB 17-16 Violet, Dorothy and Kathleen (ON 1236)

The station currently operates a Severn-class All-weather lifeboat, 17-16 Violet, Dorothy and Kathleen (ON 1236), on station since 1998.

== History ==
On 1 January 1866, the Albion was wrecked on Graemsay, one of the Orkney Islands. Fortunately 90 people survived, but 11 people died, including one man from Graemsay attempting a rescue. Following this event, a request was made to the RNLI to open a lifeboat station in the area, and after a visit by their Inspector of Lifeboats, this was agreed at a meeting of the RNLI committee of management on Thursday 1 August 1867. At the time, Stromness would be the most northerly of all the RNLI stations.

A boathouse was constructed at The Ness by Robertson & Smith, costing £144-19s-6d. An order for a 33 ft (10 m) self-righting 'Pulling and Sailing' (P&S) lifeboat, one with sails and (10) oars, and costing £280, was placed with Forrestt of Limehouse, London, with a launch-carriage costing a further £98-10s-0d. Transported to Stromness free of charge by the Aberdeen, Leith and Clyde Shipping company, the boat arrived in Stromness in August 1867. The lifeboat was provided out of a gift of £620 from Bradford manufacturer and philanthropist Titus Salt, and was duly named Saltaire after his model village near Shipley in Yorkshire.

Former lifeboat house at The Ness

An RNLI inspection in 1890 proved that The Ness was a difficult location to launch the boat. At a practice launch into a gale, it took over an hour to get the boat afloat. Whilst conditions were still not perfect at Stromness, it was recommended that the boat be relocated to Stromness harbour and remain afloat. A new 42 ft (13 m) 12-oared self-righting lifeboat was ordered from McAlister of Dumbarton, funded by the Loyal Order of Ancient Shepherds (Ashton Order) Friendly Society, and named Good Shepherd at a ceremony in Greenock on 16 May 1891. The boat arrived in Stromness on 15 June 1891.

Work began in 1900 on the construction of a new boathouse with roller slipway at Stromness harbour. Costing £1250, the boathouse was completed in 1902.

The Stromness lifeboat Good Shepherd was launched on 11 December 1907, when the steam trawler Shakespeare of Kingston-upon-Hull ran aground at Point of Spoil near Breckness. Six of the ten crew were rescued. Coxswain Superintendent Robert Greig was later awarded the RNLI Silver Medal.

RNLI trials of motor-powered lifeboats began in the early 1900s, using modified pulling and sailing lifeboats. In 1907, the RNLI placed an order with the Thames Ironworks and Shipbuilding Company, to construct four new purpose-built motor-powered lifeboats. The first of these was the 42 ft (13 m) self-righting John A. Hay (ON 591), with a 30-hp petrol engine, delivering 6.5 knots (12.0 km/h; 7.5 mph), costing £2,995, and funded from the legacy of Mr John Alexander Hay of Cheltenham. Setting out from London Docks on 15 April 1909, along with a similar boat for Stronsay, she covered the 768 miles (1,236 km) in 15 days, arriving in Stromness on 30 April 1909.

On 15 June 1916, during the First World War, HMS Hampshire struck a mine off Marwick Head, just 12 miles (19 km) north of Stromness, and sank with the loss of 737 lives, including that of Field Marshal Earl Kitchener. There were only 12 survivors. There is speculation whether it would have made any difference given the conditions, but the lifeboat was never called.

When the Fishing trawler Fresia of Grimsby foundered off Costa Head on 1 January 1922, whilst bound for home with a large catch, the open Stromness lifeboat John A, Hay (ON 561) was launched on a nine hour journey of 50 miles (80 km), in bitterly cold conditions. Nine of the crew of the Fresia perished, but two were rescued from a makeshift raft. Coxswain William Johnston was awarded the RNLI Bronze Medal.

1926 Stromness Boathouse and slipway

Melville, Dundas and Whitsun, of Glasgow started construction of a replacement boathouse and roller-slipway in 1925, on the site of the previous boathouse. Costing £10,660, it was completed in 1926. However, when a new lifeboat was due for Stromness two years later, it was proposed that they receive a 60 ft (18 m) Barnett-class lifeboat, which would need to be kept afloat due to its size. Mr George Thompson, Honorary Secretary at Stromness lifeboat station, travelled to London to meet RNLI 'Naval Architect' James Rennie Barnett, who then designed the 51 ft (16 m) Barnett-class lifeboat, now known as a Stromness-class lifeboat. Despite being specifically designed for a slipway launch from a boathouse, the new Stromness lifeboat, J. J. K. S. W. (ON 702), would be the only one ever housed and launched by slipway.

Setting out from the S. E. Saunders boatyard in Cowes at 17:00 on 15 February 1928, J. J. K. S. W. (ON 702) first travelled 120 miles (190 km) to Saint Peter Port Lifeboat Station in Guernsey, to demonstrate the new class of motor lifeboat to their crew, who were still operating the 35-foot Liverpool-class 'Pulling and Sailing' (P&S) lifeboat Arthur Lionel (ON 626). After departing Guernsey, the boat headed to Penzance, and then up the west coast, calling at many ports and stations, including Fishguard, Holyhead, Donaghadee, Campbeltown, and Ardrishaig, before traversing the Crinan Canal, and onwards via Oban, Tobermory, Portree, Stornoway and Thurso. She arrived at Stromness on 3 March 1928 to a great celebration from a large crowd, with vessels dressed and flying flags, and maroons were fired. The journey of 1,007 miles (1,621 km) had taken 18 days.

The old lifeboat John A. Hay (ON 591) had served Stromness for 19 years, being launched 31 times, and saving 90 lives. She was taken to Belfast, and after a refit, was deployed to Fenit, serving for another four years.

The Stromness-class lifeboat J. J. K. S. W. (ON 702) was launched on 14 February 1929, again into bitterly cold weather, to the fishing trawler Carmania II of Grimsby, which had run ashore on Kirk Rock in Hoy Sound after her steering gear jammed. After standing by for three hours, the tide rose sufficiently to get close, and with the use of lines and considerable skill on the part of the Coxswain, all 12 crew were saved. Coxswain Johnston was awarded the second-service clasp to his previously won Bronze medal..

Stromness lifeboat performed an exceptional service in 1930, but without a good outcome. On 28 March 1930, in gale force conditions, the Aberdeen trawler Ben Doran was wrecked on Ve Skerries, near Papa Stour, on the west side of Shetland. At the time, recent plans to establish a lifeboat station at Lerwick had not been completed, and no lifeboats operated from Shetland. After all other rescue attempts failed, the Stromness lifeboat, being the nearest, was launched at 16:30 on 30 March. In very poor conditions, the lifeboat first sailed to Scalloway as a staging point for food and a refuel, arriving at 07:30 on the 31 March, before heading around Shetland with a local Pilot, to Ve Skerries. All that was found was the wreck, and no survivors. The lifeboat headed back to Scalloway, before commencing the 16½ hour journey back to Stromness, arriving at 23:00 on 1 April. J.J.K.S.W. (ON 702) had been away for 55 hours, and travelled 320 miles (510 km).

Stromness Arun-class lifeboat 52-29 The Joseph Rothwell Sykes and Hilda M. (ON 1099)

At 08:50 on 17 June 1992, the relief Arun-class lifeboat 52-31 Newsbuoy (ON 1103) was tasked to the aid of the replica 12th century longboat, on passage from Stornoway to Faroe. The vessel, the Hebredean Birlinn Aileach had suffered steering failure, 40 miles (64 km) north of Cape Wrath. After a journey of over 70 miles (110 km) in force 6–7 conditions, the lifeboat arrived with the vessel at 13:51. With the crew of nine aboard the lifeboat, the vessel was taken in tow, arriving back at Stromness at 20:55, a service of over 11 hours. 'A Collective Letter of Thanks, signed by the Chairman of the Institution' was presented to the lifeboat crew.

In 1998, Stromness received their latest lifeboat. A Severn-class lifeboat is the largest type of the RNLI fleet, fitted with twin 'Caterpillar 3412' 1200-bhp marine diesel engines, providing a top speed of 25 knots (46 km/h; 29 mph), and costing £1,580,000. Funded from the estate of the late Miss Violet Matton of Seaford, East Sussex, and the wills of her two sisters, Dorothy and Kathleen, she was named 17-16 Violet, Dorothy and Kathleen (ON 1236).

== Station honours ==
The following are awards made at Stromness:

- RNLI Silver Medal
  Robert Leask Jr., Farmer – 1873
  Robert Greig, Coxswain Superintendent – 1908
- RNLI Bronze Medal
  William Johnston, Coxswain – 1922
  William Johnston, Coxswain – 1929 (Second-Service clasp)
- 'The Thanks of the Institution inscribed on Vellum'
  The son of Robert Leask Jr. – 1873
  William Sinclair, Coxswain – 1953
  John Banks, Coxswain – 2002
- 'A Collective Letter of Thanks, signed by the Chairman of the Institution'
  James Flett, Coxswain – 1992
  John Banks, Second Coxswain – 1992
  Ronald Taylor, Mechanic – 1992
  James Adam, Assistant Mechanic – 1992
  Douglas Adam, crew member – 1992
  William Wilson, crew member – 1992
  Robert Craigie, crew member – 1992
- Letter of appreciation from the Danish Government
  Stromness Lifeboat Crew – 1939
- Member, Order of the British Empire (MBE)
  George Linklater Thomson, Honorary Secretary – 1941KBH

== Stromness lifeboats ==
=== Pulling and Sailing (P&S) lifeboats ===
ON (Note: ON is the RNLI's Official Number of the boat.)	Name	Built	On station	Class	Comments
286	Saltaire	1867	1867−1891	33-foot Peake self-righting (P&S)	(Note: 33 ft 0 in (10.06 m) x 8 ft 6 in (2.59 m) (10-oared) Peake-class self-righting (P&S) lifeboat, gift of Sir Titus Salt, 1st Baronet of Leeds, built by Forrestt of Limehouse, London, costing £280.); Transferred to the Relief fleet (Reserve No. 6), sold in 1895.
299	Good Shepherd	1891	1891−1909	42-foot self-righting (P&S)	(Note: 42 ft 0 in (12.80 m) x 11 ft 0 in (3.35 m) (12-oared) self-righting (P&S) lifeboat, funded by the Loyal Order of Ancient Shepherds, built by McAlister of Dumbarton, costing £519.); Sold in 1909. Became a Mail boat/ Ferry. Wrecked at Fair Isle, February 1937.

=== Motor lifeboats ===
ON	Op.No. (Note: Op.No. is the RNLI's Operational Number of the boat carried on the hull.)	Name	Built	On station	Class	Comments
561	–	John A. Hay	1908	1909−1928	42-foot self-righting (motor)	(Note: 42 ft 0 in (12.80 m) x 11 ft 6 in (3.51 m) self-righting (motor) lifeboat, legacy of Mr J. A. Hay of Cheltenham, built by Thames Ironworks of Blackwall, London, costing £2,995.); First purpose-built motor-powered lifeboat. Transferred to Fenit.
702	–	J. J. K. S. W.	1928	1928−1955	51-foot Barnett (Stromness-class)	
924	–	Archibald and Alexander M. Patterson	1955	1955−1984	52-foot Barnett (Mk. I)	Transferred to Arranmore.
1099	52-29	The Joseph Rothwell Sykes and Hilda M.	1984	1984−1998	Arun	Transferred to the Relief fleet. Later at Broughty Ferry.
1236	17-16	Violet, Dorothy and Kathleen	1998	1998−	Severn	

More post-service details can be found on the respective lifeboat class pages.

== See also ==
- List of RNLI stations
- List of former RNLI stations
- Royal National Lifeboat Institution lifeboats
