= Port Erroll Lifeboat Station =

Former RNLI lifeboat station in Aberdeenshire, Scotland

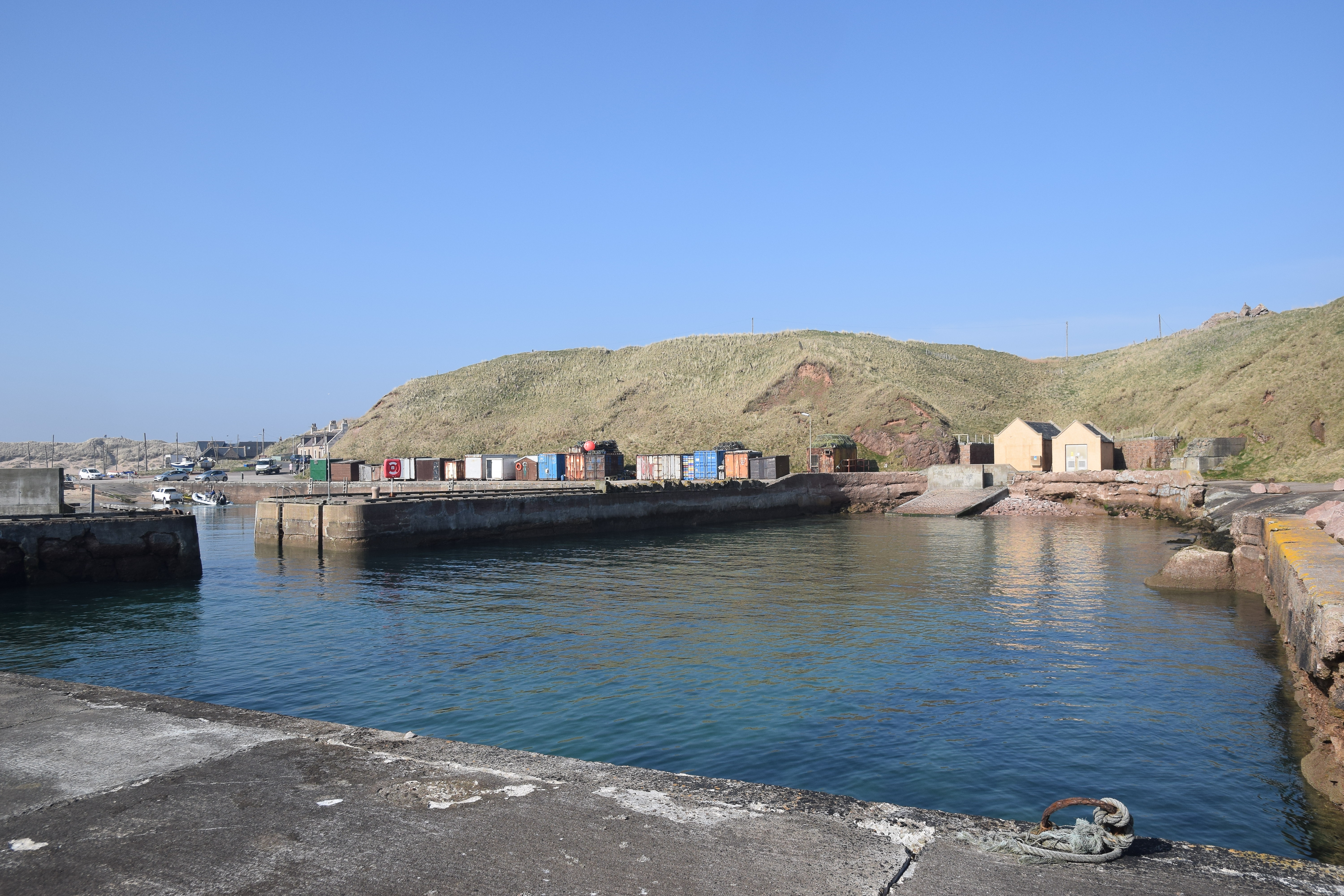
- Port Erroll harbour and former lifeboat station

- Port Erroll, Aberdeenshire
- Former names: Cruden Bay Lifeboat Station

General information
- Status: Closed
- Location: Port Erroll Harbour, Cruden Bay, Aberdeenshire, AB41 6BY, Scotland
- Coordinates: 57°24′40.3″N 1°50′36.6″W
- Opened: 30 October 1877
- Closed: 1921

Port Erroll Lifeboat Station was located at Port Erroll harbour, which sits at the mouth of the Water of Cruden, near Cruden Bay, a village approximately 8 miles (13 km) south-west of Peterhead, in the county of Aberdeenshire, on the east coast of Scotland.

The lifeboat station, initially named Cruden Bay Lifeboat Station, was established at Port Erroll in 1877, by the Royal National Lifeboat Institution (RNLI).

After 44 years service, with a brief closure in 1914, Port Erroll Lifeboat Station closed in 1921.

== History ==
Following application by the Earl of Erroll, his son Lord Kilmarnock, and other local residents, and with reference to the subsequent visit and report by the Assistant-Inspector of Life-boats, Capt. Jones, RN, it was decided at a meeting of the RNLI committee of management on 6 January 1876, to establish a lifeboat station at Cruden Bay, "..where it is thought the boat is likely to render good service occasionally to the crews of vessels in distress off that part of the coast and to the fishermen of the place, this being a rising fishing port."

A 33-foot self-righting 'Pulling and Sailing' (P&S) lifeboat, one with sails and (10) oars, was sent to Port Erroll harbour. The cost of the lifeboat, £328-18s, was defrayed by the gift of £500 , sent via the London branch of the Bank of New South Wales at Whanganui, New Zealand from a resident donor, Mr G. Marshall-May, "A Scot Abroad", who wished to provide a lifeboat for the Scottish coast, and for it to be named Peep O'Day.

At a ceremony on 30 October 1877, in front of a large number of spectators, prayers were said by Rev. Robert Ross, before the lifeboat was handed to the care of the local lifeboat committee. Lady Kilmarnock then duly named the lifeboat Peep O'Day, before it was launched into the harbour for a demonstration to the assembled crowd.

At 09:00 on the 26 August 1881, the lifeboat Peep O'Day was launched into a strong easterly gale, to help a fishing boat. The boat was encountering difficulties entering the Port Erroll Harbour, and was towed into port by the lifeboat. During the course of the day, seven further vessels were give similar assistance.

In 1884, the station was renamed Port Erroll Lifeboat Station.

Peep O'Day served at Port Erroll for 11 years, until she was replaced by the Frances Camilla Howard (ON 149). The new 34-foot lifeboat was the gift of Miss Dixon of Cheltenham, and named in memory of the late Mrs. Atherton Howard, herself a donor of two lifeboats.

On 24 February 1892, the Port Erroll lifeboat Frances Camilla Howard (ON 149) would attend the French schooner Perle of Dunkirk three times, launching first at 20:30, after the vessel was driven ashore at Cruden Bay. Some men tried to get ashore by jumping into the sea, tied to a rope, but all were drowned. 11 men were brought ashore by the lifeboat. After initial communication difficulties, the lifeboat crew then realised that there was an ill boy still aboard, who was rescued on a second trip. The lifeboat then went out a third time, this time to cut the rope, allowing the drowned men to be pulled ashore.

The Frances Camilla Howard (ON 149) was launched at 23:00 on the 16 September 1898 to the aid of the steamship Milwaukee of Liverpool, which stranded on Cruden Scars. The lifeboat stood by until 05:30, when 21 men were taken on board the lifeboat, and landed at Port Erroll at 06:30. With the exception of the Master and chief officer, the remaining 20 crew were brought ashore by a tug and a fishing boat.

Port Erroll would receive their third and last lifeboat in 1904. The John Fortune (ON 523) was a larger 38-foot Watson class (P&S) lifeboat, and along with all equipment, was funded from the legacy of the late Dr John Fortune of Edinburgh.

On 16 November 1913, following an exercise session, the lifeboat was being winched back in to the lifeboat house, when the winch was let go. The lifeboat ran back down the slipway, causing the winch handles to spin violently. One flew off, and struck Charles Summers on the head, rendering him unconscious. He was taken immediately to Aberdeen Royal Infirmary, but died soon afterwards.

Following the visit and report of the Deputy Chief Inspector of Lifeboats, at a meeting of the RNLI committee of management on Thursday 12 March 1914, it was resolved that Port Erroll Lifeboat Station was to be closed, primarily due to the difficulties maintaining a crew.

However, in 1915, it was decided that a crew from Peterhead could be transported to the station should the need arise, and Port Erroll Lifeboat Station was reopened. The John Fortune (ON 523) was returned to service, staying on station until 1921, when the station was closed permanently.

The station building still stands, thought to now be toilet facilities for the harbour. The lifeboat on station at the time of closure, John Fortune (ON 523), was transferred back to the relief fleet, before being sold from service in 1923. It was last reported as a yacht, but was lost in 1975.

== Roll of honour ==
In memory of those lost whilst serving Port Erroll lifeboat:

- Struck by a flying winch handle whilst recovering the lifeboat after exercise, and died shortly afterwards in hospital, 16 November 1913.

Charles Spurgeon Summers (52)

== Port Erroll lifeboats ==
=== Pulling and Sailing (P&S) lifeboats ===
ON (Note: ON is the RNLI's Official Number of the boat.)	Name	Built	On station	Class	Comments
Pre-618	Peep O'Day	1877	1877–1888	33-foot Peake Self-righting (P&S)	(Note: 33-foot x 8-foot 6in (10-oared) Peake-class self-righting (P&S) lifeboat, gift of Mr G. Marshall-May, of Whanganui, New Zealand, costing £329.)
149	Frances Camilla Howard	1888	1888–1904	34-foot Self-righting (P&S)	(Note: 34-foot x 8-foot (10-oared) self-righting (P&S) lifeboat, gift of Miss Dixon of Cheltenham, built by Livie of Dundee, costing £377.)
523	John Fortune	1904	1904–1914	38-foot Watson (P&S)	(Note: 38-foot x 9-foot 4in (12-oared) Watson-class non-self-righting (P&S) lifeboat, legacy of Dr J. Fortune of Edinburgh, built by Thames Ironworks of Blackwall, London, costing £1,007.)
Station Closed 1914–1915
523	John Fortune	1904	1915–1921	38-foot Watson (P&S)	

Station Closed in 1921

Pre ON numbers are unofficial numbers used by the Lifeboat Enthusiasts' Society to reference early lifeboats not included on the official RNLI list.

== See also ==
- List of RNLI stations
- List of former RNLI stations
- Royal National Lifeboat Institution lifeboats
