= Johnshaven Lifeboat Station =

Former RNLI lifeboat station in Aberdeenshire, Scotland

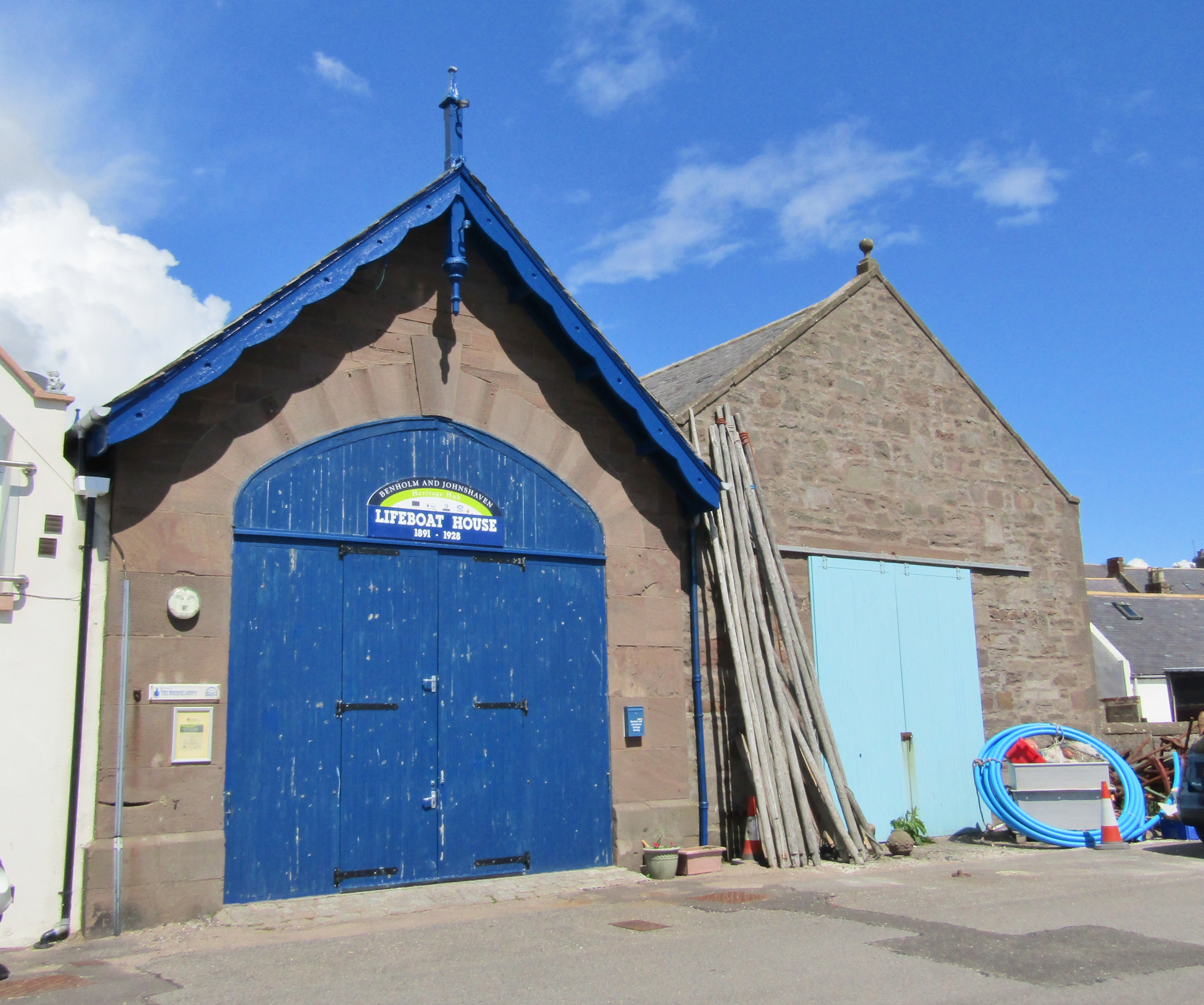
- Johnshaven former lifeboat station

- Johnshaven, Aberdeenshire

General information
- Status: Closed
- Location: The Old Lifeboat House, Fore Street,, Johnshaven, Aberdeenshire, DD10 0EU, Scotland
- Coordinates: 56°47′39.9″N 2°20′08.5″W
- Opened: 1891
- Closed: 1928

Johnshaven Lifeboat Station was located at Fore Street, in Johnshaven, a village approximately 40 miles (64 km) north-east of Dundee, in the county of Aberdeenshire, historically Kincardineshire, on the east coast of Scotland.

A lifeboat was first placed at Johnshaven in 1891 by the Royal National Lifeboat Institution (RNLI).

After operating for 37 years, Johnshaven Lifeboat Station was closed in 1928.

== History ==
At the meeting of the RNLI committee of management on Thursday 12 June 1890, following a report by the District Inspector, it was decided to establish a lifeboat station at Johnshaven, Kincardineshire.

A 31-foot (9.4 m) self-righting 'Pulling and Sailing' (P&S) lifeboat, one with (ten) oars and sails, equipped with all the latest improvements, water ejection tubes, water ballast tanks, etc. was placed at Johnshaven on 5 August 1891. A new boathouse with launching slipway was constructed on Fore Street.

A service of dedication and naming ceremony was held on 3 October 1891, a day marked in honour locally as a holiday. Over one thousand people took part in a parade of the lifeboat, the largest ever seen in the village, with the crew in their cork life-jackets and red caps, and the lifeboat drawn on its carriage by six horses. The cost of the lifeboat and equipment was from the bequest of the late Mr. Alexander Davidson of Hampstead, a London trader but native of Scotland. In front of an enormous crowd, in accordance with his wishes, the lifeboat was named Meanwell of Glenbervie (ON 320). With the Montrose Band playing, and the crowd cheering, the lifeboat was then launched on display.

In the early hours of 7 February 1894, the small steamship Sarah, on passage from Bridgeness in West Lothian to Fraserburgh, with a cargo of coal, ran aground near Johnshaven. Rocket lines fell short of the wreck. In a strong south-west gale, it was a difficult row by the crew of the Johnshaven lifeboat Meanwell of Glenbervie, but all five crew of the Sarah were rescued and landed at the harbour.

On 26 September 1896, in a southerly gale and rough seas, Edward McBay, Master of the fishing lugger Friendship of Johnshaven, and also coxswain of the Johnshaven Lifeboat, along with his son James and crew, were fishing at the mouth of Loch Nevis near Mallaig, when they became involved in the rescue of three crew from the fishing boat Speedwell, which had been swamped. Whilst man was brought aboard, at great risk to himself, James McBay jumped in the water, and swam 50 yd (46 m) to rescue the other two men. For this service, James McBay was awarded the RNLI Silver Medal, with his father Edward accorded "*The Thanks of the Institution inscribed on Vellum".

A new lifeboat was placed on service at Johnshaven in 1900. Larger than the previous boat at 35-foot, the lifeboat was named Sarah Ann Holden (ON 449), following a bequest to the Institution by Miss S. A. Holden of Rochdale.

At 18:00 on the 25 January 1902, the Sarah Ann Holden was launched to the aid of the vessel Lord Clyde of Banff, which had been driven ashore at the Burn of Benholm, 1.5 miles (2.4 km) north of Johnshaven, whilst on passage from Sunderland, with a cargo of coal. After initially declining rescue by rocket line, as the boat seemed intact, the crew then took to the lifeboat. At 22:30, the lifeboat, and crew of the Lord Clyde, set out again on the flood tide, with a view to retrieving the vessel, but the wind was now gale-force, and attempts were abandoned. By daybreak, the vessel was seen breaking up.

At 11:45 on 21 December 1920, the Johnshaven lifeboat James Marsh (ON 639) was launched to the aid of the Danish schooner Fredensborg of Korsør, on passage from Copenhagen to Grangemouth with a cargo of scrap iron, and a crew of nine. The vessel had lost all her canvas, and was dragging her anchors in St Cyrus Bay. With the nine crew aboard the lifeboat, they set to return home, but caught by a large wave, the lifeboat was upset, and all aboard were pitched into the sea. The lifeboat self-righted, but two of the Fredensborg crew, and lifeboat man James McBay, a veteran of World War I, were lost. The lifeboat was then thrown onto the shore and badly damaged.

The King of Denmark made a monetary award to the widow of James McBay. In recognition of the efforts of 1920, the Danish King awarded a silver cup to each member of the Johnshaven lifeboat crew, inscribed...

"Awarded by the Royal Danish Government, in recognition of bravery and self-sacrifice
on the occasion of the rescue of the crew of the schooner Fredensborg, of Korsør,
wrecked in St. Cyrus Bay, on the 21st December, 1920."

The Carnegie Hero Fund added the name "James McBay" to the 'Roll of Heroes', and a sum of 10 shillings per week, was granted to his widow.

The James Marsh (ON 639) was withdrawn for repairs, and replaced with the James Stevens No. 11 (ON 438).

Seven years later, at a meeting of the RNLI committee of management on Thursday 19 January 1928, with motor lifeboats to the north at Aberdeen, and to the south at Montrose, it was decided to close Johnshaven Lifeboat Station.

The lifeboat house still stands at Johnshaven, and is currently occupied by the Johnshaven Heritage Museum. The lifeboat on station at the time of closure, James Stevens No. 11 (ON 438), was sold from service.

== Station honours ==
The following are awards made at Johnshaven.

- RNLI Silver Medal

James McBay – 1896

John Simpson, fisherman – 1907

- Medal awarded by the Royal Humane Society

Edward McBay, Coxswain – 1897

- Silver Cup, awarded by The King of Denmark

John McBay, Coxswain, and each of the lifeboat crew – 1921

- 50 Guineas, awarded by The King of Denmark

Mrs James McBay, widow – 1921

- The Thanks of the Institution inscribed on Vellum

Edward McBay – 1896

John McBay, Coxswain – 1921

Robert Stewart, JP, Honorary Secretary – 1928

== Roll of honour ==
In memory of those lost whilst serving Johnshaven lifeboat.

- Lost when the lifeboat James Marsh capsized after service to the Danish schooner Fredensborg, 21 December 1920.

James McBay (38)

== Johnshaven lifeboats ==
=== Pulling and Sailing (P&S) lifeboats ===
ON (Note: ON is the RNLI's Official Number of the boat.)	Name	Built	On station	Class	Comments
320	Meanwell of Glenbervie	1891	1891–1900	31-foot Self-righting (P&S)	(Note: 31-foot x 7-foot 3in (10-oared) self-righting (P&S) lifeboat, gift of Mr A. Davidson of Hampstead and Glenverbie, built by Woolfe of Shadwell, London, costing £301.)
449	Sarah Ann Holden	1900	1900–1914	35-foot Self-righting (P&S)	(Note: 35-foot x 8-foot 6in (10-oared) self-righting (P&S) lifeboat, legacy of Miss S. A. Holden of Rochdale, built by Thames Ironworks of Blackwall, London, costing £869.)
639	James Marsh	1914	1914–1921	35-foot Self-righting (P&S)	(Note: 35-foot x 8-foot 6in (10-oared) self-righting (P&S) lifeboat, legacy of Miss C. Marsh of Aberdeen, built by Thames Ironworks of Blackwall, London, completed by S. E. Saunders of Cowes, costing £1,338.)
438	James Stevens No. 11	1899	1921–1928	35-foot Self-righting (P&S)	(Note: 35-foot x 8-foot 6in (10-oared) self-righting (P&S) lifeboat, legacy of Mr J. Stevens of Birmingham, built by Thames Ironworks of Blackwall, London, costing £823when new.); Previously at New Romney.

Station Closed in 1928

Pre ON numbers are unofficial numbers used by the Lifeboat Enthusiast Society to reference early lifeboats not included on the official RNLI list.

== See also ==
- List of RNLI stations
- List of former RNLI stations
- Royal National Lifeboat Institution lifeboats
