= Fenit Lifeboat Station =

RNLI lifeboat station in County Kerry, Ireland

- Fenit Lifeboat Station in 2026

- Location within Ireland
- Former names: Tralee Bay Lifeboat Station

General information
- Type: RNLI Lifeboat Station
- Location: The Harbour, Fenit, County Kerry, Ireland
- Coordinates: 52°16′18.2″N 9°51′46.7″W
- Opened: 1879–1969; 1994–present
- Owner: Royal National Lifeboat Institution

Website
- Fenit RNLI Lifeboat Station

Fenit Lifeboat Station is located at the Harbour in Fenit, a village sitting north of the Dingle Peninsula, and south of the River Shannon estuary in County Kerry, on the south west coast of Ireland.

A lifeboat station was first established at Fenit in 1879 by the Royal National Lifeboat Institution (RNLI), and named Tralee Bay Lifeboat Station.

The station currently operates the Shannon-class lifeboat 13-60 Roy Barker VII (ON 1367), on station since 2026, and the small D-class (IB1) Inshore lifeboat Lizzie (D-860), on station since 2022.

== History ==
On 19 November 1850, the brig Enrichetta, on passage from Barletta to Falmouth, Cornwall, was wrecked off County Kerry. John Town, Chief Officer, H.M. Coastguard, led a party of men, to wade out in the surf, and rescue the 12 man crew. Ever since its founding in 1824, the Royal National Institution for the Preservation of Life from Shipwreck (RNIPLS), later to become the RNLI in 1854, would award medals for deeds of gallantry at sea, even if no lifeboats were involved. John Town was awarded the RNIPLS Silver Medal.

Tralee Bay Lifeboat Station was established at Fenit in 1879 by the RNLI, following application by local residents for a lifeboat to be placed in the area. A boathouse was constructed at the top of the lane to Kelly's beach, at a cost of £393-15s, on land granted by John Hurly of Fenit House. A 34-foot self-righting 'Pulling and Sailing' (P&S) lifeboat, one with sails and (10) oars, costing £363, along with its launch carriage, which cost a further £137-10s, was given free passage to the station, by steamer from London to Cork, with the City of Cork Steam Ship company, and then by rail to Tralee, with the Great Southern and Western Railway.

At a ceremony on the 26 June 1879, the new lifeboat station was opened, and the lifeboat named Admiral Butcher. On a memorial stone tablet in the station was inscribed:

The Admiral Butcher life-boat was placed here, on the coast of his native country, by Richard George Butcher, Surgeon, in affectionate remembrance of his father, Admiral Samuel Butcher and his brother, Samuel Butcher, S.T.P., sometime Regius Professor of Divinity in Trinity College, Dublin, and Lord Bishop of Meath.

'Jehovah make the storm calm, so that the waves thereof are still.' (Ps. CVII 29).

'And Jesus arose, and rebuked the wind, and said unto the sea, Peace, be still.' (St Mark IV 39).

The whole cost of the lifeboat, carriage, boathouse and equipment was provided by the gift of Dublin surgeon Dr. Richard George Herbert Butcher, MD MRIA FRCS (1816–1891), president of the Royal College of Surgeons in Ireland, 1866–67, in memory of his late father, Samuel Butcher (Royal Navy officer), and his brother, Samuel Butcher (bishop).

The name of the station was formally changed to Fenit (Tralee Bay) Lifeboat Station in 1892.

Continuing the tradition of awarding medals for gallantry at sea, four RNLI Bronze Medals were awarded at Fenit, firstly in 1920, to a young boy, for his efforts to rescue his friend, and then in 1930, to three fishermen who rescued the three crew of the steamship Co-operator of Tralee.

After a comprehensive review of operational requirements, it was decided that two lifeboat stations in Ireland were to be closed, Helvick Head and Fenit. Fenit lifeboat station closed in 1969. The Barnett-class lifeboat on station, Hilton Briggs (ON 889), was transferred to the relief fleet, later to serve at Longhope and Invergordon.

== 1994 onwards ==
At an RNLI management meeting on 24 November 1993, it was noted that there was increasing activity on the west coast of Ireland, and that an additional All-weather lifeboat should be placed between the lifeboat stations of Valentia and Galway. It was decided that the station at Fenit be re-established, initially for a 1-year evaluation period, now to be known as Fenit Lifeboat Station. The old boathouse was no longer suitable as a station, so a temporary Portakabin was placed on the quay, and the harbour was dredged for a mooring. In 1994, Fenit lifeboat station was reopened with the arrival of the Arun All-weather lifeboat 52-22 Ralph and Bonella Ferrant (ON 1081). The new Fenit lifeboat performed her first service with the new crew before even arriving on station, when she responded to a mayday call from the motor boat Mayfly off Salcombe, whilst on passage to Fenit.

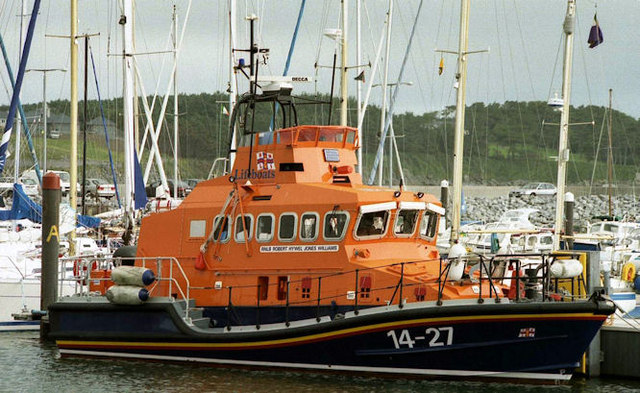
Fenit Trent-class lifeboat

The station received two lifeboats in 1999. The Arun-class was replaced by the current All-weather lifeboat, the Trent Robert Hywel Jones Williams (ON 1239), and a D-class (EA16) Inshore lifeboat, Ann Speed (D-404) was also placed at the station for evaluation.

Following the death of Bangor lifeboat mechanic Bradley Burns, who died of cancer in 2005, and his wife Sonia, lifeboat administrator, who died suddenly the following year, €39,000 was raised by the lifeboat crew from Bangor, to pay for a lifeboat to be named in their memory. At a ceremony in September 2010, a new D-class (IB1) Inshore lifeboat was placed at Fenit, and named Bradley and Sonia (D-729).

Floating boathouse housing the Fenit D-class Inshore lifeboat

In 2022, Bradley and Sonia (D-729) was retired, and a new Inshore lifeboat placed on station. The boat was funded from the legacy of Elizabeth Joan Finch, better known as British Film and TV actress Liz Fraser. At a ceremony on 29 May 2022, the lifeboat was named Lizzie (D-860).

On 21 April 2026, seven members of Fenit RNLI attended the bell ringing ceremony at the RNLI All-Weather Lifeboat Centre in Poole, held when a new Shannon-class lifeboat leaves the production line and is placed in the water for the first time. Following completion of sea-trials and crew training, the new lifeboat, 13-60 Roy Barker VII (ON 1367), arrived at Fenit on 12 September 2026, and was declared operational three days later on 15 September.

The £2.7m lifeboat has been funded from the Roy Barker Memorial Fund. Mr Frederick Roy Barker was the Managing Director and Chairman of Banbury Stockyard in Oxfordshire, having built up the company to become the largest livestock trading centre in Europe, and left his entire estate to the RNLI following his death in 1992. Previously the fund has provided three Trent-class lifeboats, a Tamar-class, two Shannon-class lifeboats, and the Shannon Launch and Recovery System (SLARS) for Llandudno.

== Station honours ==
The following are awards made at Fenit:

- RNIPLS Silver Medal
  John Town, Chief Officer, H.M. Coastguard, Castlegregory – 1850
- RNLI Bronze Medal
  John F. O'Mahoney (age 12) – 1920
  John Nolan, fisherman – 1930
  John Cahill, fisherman – 1930
  Joseph Cahill, fisherman – 1930
- Silver watches, presented by the Institution
  Thomas Crowley, Coxswain – 1933
  John Doyle, Mechanic – 1933
- 'A Framed Letter of Thanks signed by the Chairman of the Institution'
  Gerard O’Donnell, Deputy Launching Authority – 1996
  Niall Hickey, Assistant Mechanic – 1996
  John Moriarty, Deputy Second Coxswain – 1996

== Fenit lifeboats ==
=== Pulling and Sailing (P&S) lifeboats ===
ON (Note: ON is the RNLI's Official Number of the boat.)	Name	Built	On station	Class	Comments
pre-635	Admiral Butcher	1878	1879–1890	34-foot self-righting (P&S)	(Note: 34 ft 0 in (10.36 m) x 8 ft 3 in (2.51 m) (10-oared) self-righting (P&S) lifeboat, gift of Mr R. G. Butcher of Bromborough, built by Woolfe of Shadwell, London, costing £363.); Sold for £5 in 1890.
305	Louisa and Emma	1890	1890–1895	34-foot self-righting (P&S)	(Note: 34 ft 0 in (10.36 m) x 8 ft 0 in (2.44 m) (10-oared) self-righting (P&S) lifeboat, legacy of Miss L. C. Sargesson of London, built by Forrestt of Limehouse, London, costing £400.); Sold in December 1895.
382	John Willmot	1895	1895–1923	42-foot self-righting (P&S)	(Note: 42 ft 0 in (12.80 m) x 11 ft 4 in (3.45 m) (12-oared) self-righting (P&S) lifeboat, legacy of Miss J. E. King of Hammersmith, built by Rutherford of Birkenhead, costing £652.); Sold in 1924.
457	James Stevens No.20	1901	1923–1928	43-foot Watson (P&S)	(Note: 43 ft 0 in (13.11 m) x 12 ft 3 in (3.73 m) (10-oared) Watson-class non-self-righting (P&S) lifeboat, legacy of Mr J. Stevens of Birmingham, built by Thames Ironworks of Blackwall, London, costing £1,739 when new.); Previously at Queenstown. Sold in 1928. Renamed Eternal Wave. Last reported at Dartmouth in the 1970s.

Pre ON numbers are unofficial numbers used by the Lifeboat Enthusiasts' Society to reference early lifeboats not included on the official RNLI list.

=== Motor lifeboats ===
ON	Op.No. (Note: Op.No. is the RNLI's Operational Number of the boat carried on the hull.)	Name	Built	On station	Class	Comments
561	–	John A. Hay	1908	1928–1932	42-foot self-righting (motor)	(Note: 42 ft 0 in (12.80 m) x 11 ft 6 in (3.51 m) self-righting (motor) lifeboat, legacy of Mr J. A. Hay of Cheltenham, fitted with a 30-HP 'Tylor' petrol engine, built by Thames Ironworks of Blackwall, London, costing £2,995 when new.); First purpose-built motor-powered lifeboat, previously at Stromness.
755	–	Peter and Sarah Blake	1932	1932–1958	51-foot Barnett	
889	–	Hilton Briggs	1951	1958–1969	52-foot Barnett (Mk.I)	Previously at Aberdeen. Transferred to the Relief fleet, later at Longhope.
Station Closed, 1969–1994
1081	52-22	Ralph and Bonella Ferrant	1982	1994–1999	Arun	From the Relief fleet.
1239	14-27	Robert Hywel Jones Williams	1999	1999–2026	Trent	Withdrawn 15 September 2026.
1367	13-60	Roy Barker VII	2026	2026–	Shannon	

More post-service details can be found on the respective lifeboat class pages.

=== Inshore lifeboats ===
==== D class ====
Op.No.	Name	On station	Class	Comments
D-404	Ann Speed	1999–2000	D-class (EA16)	
D-488	Mabel	2000–2001	D-class (EA16)	
D-561	Cursitor Street	2001–2009	D-class (EA16)	
D-523	Peterborough Beer Festival I	2009–2010	D-class (EA16)	
D-729	Bradley and Sonia	2010–2022	D-class (IB1)	
D-860	Lizzie	2022–	D-class (IB1)	

== See also ==
- List of RNLI stations
- List of former RNLI stations
- Royal National Lifeboat Institution lifeboats

== Sources ==
- Leonard, Richie; Denton, Tony (2025). Lifeboat Enthusiasts Handbook 2025. Lifeboats Enthusiasts' Society.
- Leonard, Richie; Denton, Tony (2026). Lifeboat Enthusiasts Handbook 2026. Lifeboats Enthusiasts' Society.
