= Watson-class P&S lifeboat =

Former RNLI lifeboat class

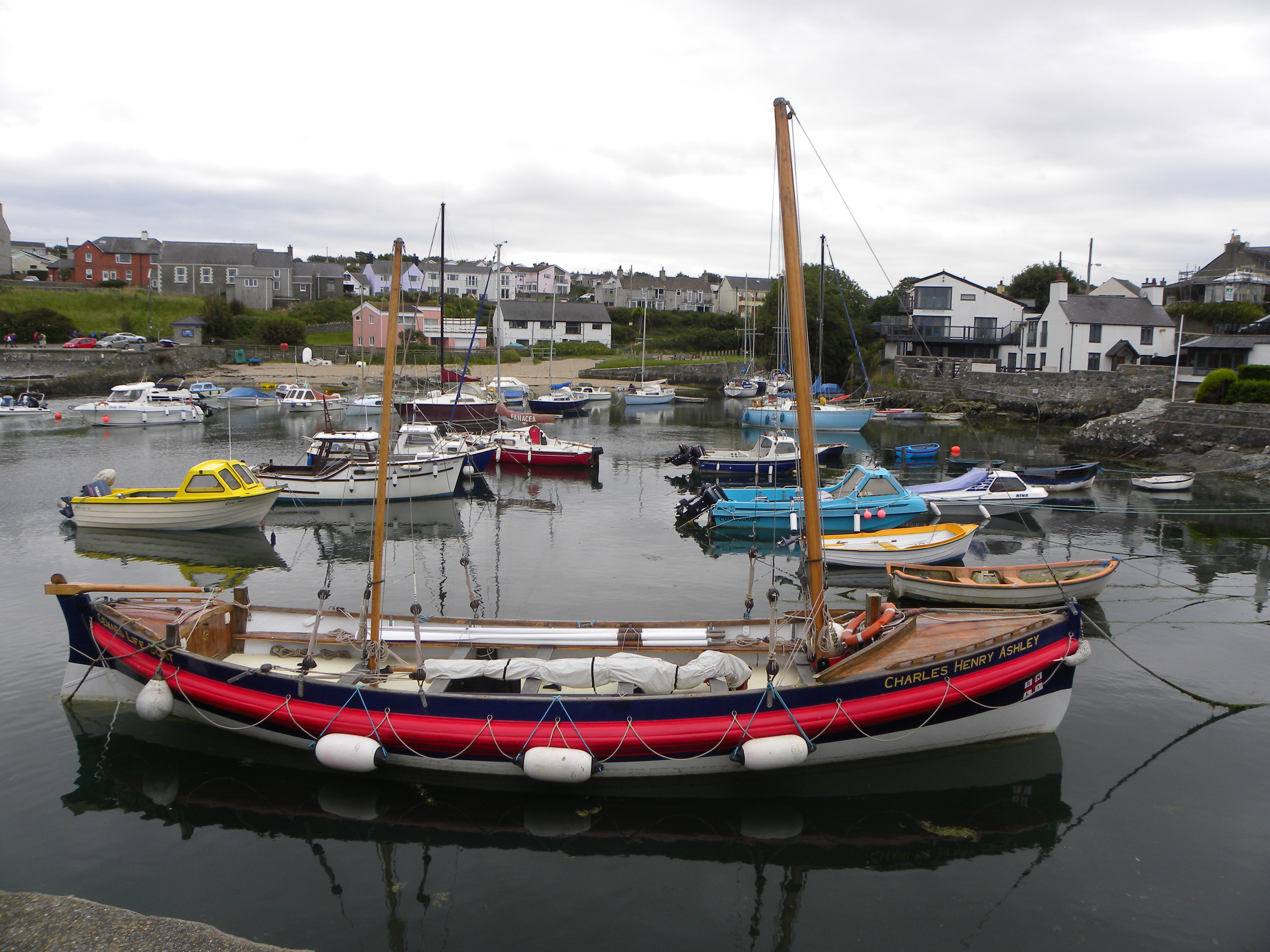
- 38-foot Watson P&S lifeboat RNLB Charles Henry Ashley (ON 583) at Cemaes harbour, 2017

Class overview
- Builders: Barrow Naval Co., Barrow; Henderson, Partick; Chambers and Colby, Lowestoft; R. McAlister of Dumbarton; Forrestt of Limehouse; Hollwey of Dublin; Reynolds of Lowestoft; S. Strickland of Dartmouth; Thames Ironworks, Blackwall; S. E. Saunders, Cowes
- Operators: Royal National Lifeboat Institution
- Built: 1888–1915
- In service: 1888–1939
- Completed: 43
- Retired: 43
- Preserved: 3

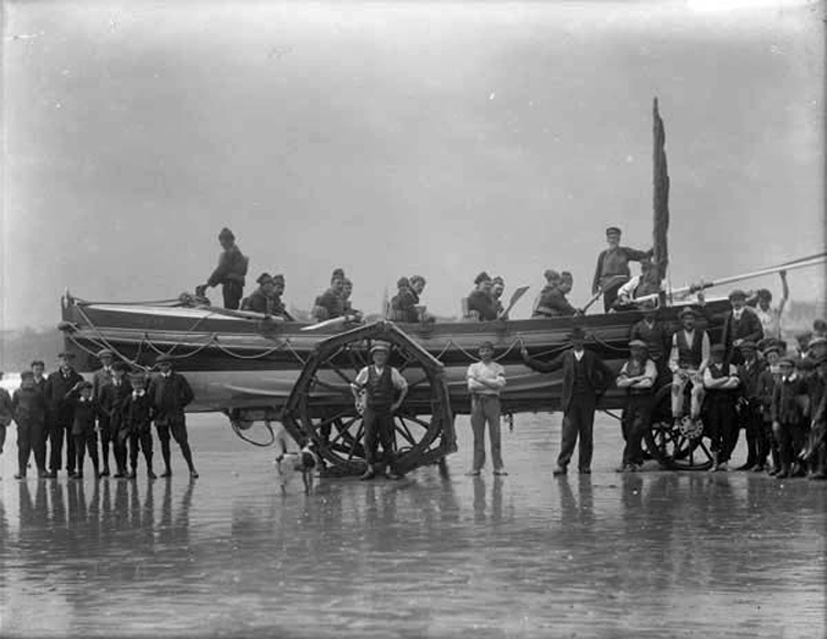
RNLB Henley (ON 348) at Tramore, Co. Waterford, 1910

The Watson-class P&S lifeboat is a design of wooden lifeboat, operated by the Royal National Lifeboat Institution (RNLI) around the coasts of the United Kingdom and Ireland between 1888 and 1939. There were several variations over the years but all the boats had hulls that conformed to a design by George Lennox Watson (30 October 1851 – 12 November 1904), the RNLI's naval architect from 1887 until his death in 1904.

Following trials of P&S lifeboats with an added engine, the RNLI started production of motor-powered Watson-class lifeboats in 1908; these served until 1991.

== Pulling and Sailing (P&S) lifeboats ==
Pulling and Sailing (P&S) lifeboats are ones utilising both sails and oars for propulsion. Early lifeboats had as few as four oarsmen, but some later and larger craft operated with up to 16 oarsmen and three other crew.

The majority of lifeboats in service with the RNLI during the second half of the nineteenth century were of the Self-Righting type, designed to operate in rough seas close to the shore. Usually, the boat would have a heavy iron keel, and strategically fitted buoyancy aids, which would bring the boat upright following a capsize.

Some stations, which required a better sea-going boat, preferred the greater stability of a non-self-righting boat, such as the Norfolk and Suffolk class of lifeboat. This was especially relevant to those operating in shallow conditions, where a capsized boat might get caught on the sea-bottom and not self-right. Following the Southport and St Anne's lifeboats disaster, George Lennox Watson designed a new non-self-righting hull shape for the RNLI, which was first used for the construction of RNLB Edith and Annie (ON 208), built in 1888.

A further 42 pulling and sailing lifeboats were built to Watson's design, the last in 1915, some 11 years after his death. They came in a variety of lengths to suit the needs of the different stations where they were based, the most common being 38 feet (12 m). The first ten were constructed by no fewer than eight different boat-builders, but the remaining 33 were constructed by Thames Ironworks of Blackwall, although the last one, Staughton (ON 637), was completed after a gap of five years, by S. E. Saunders, following the insolvency of Thames Ironworks.

RNLB Jones-Gibb (ON 538) was the last Watson P&S lifeboat on service, withdrawn from Barmouth in 1939, and also outlasting Albert Edward (ON 463), which had received a motor conversion in 1912, and operating until 1932.

=== Watson-class P&S lifeboat fleet ===
ON (Note: ON is the RNLI's Official Number of the boat.)	Name	Length	Built	In service	Station	Comments
208	Edith and Annie	42 ft 6 in (12.95 m)	1888	1888–1902	Southport No.2	(Note: 42 ft 6 in (12.95 m) x 13 ft 2 in (4.01 m) (12-oared) lifeboat, gift of the Misses Macrae of Southport, built by Barrow Naval Co. of Barrow, costing £844.); Condemned and sold, 1902.
315	Brothers	43 ft 0 in (13.11 m)	1892	1892–1910	St Annes No. 2	(Note: 43 ft 0 in (13.11 m) x 11 ft 9 in (3.58 m) (12-oared) lifeboat, an anonymous gift, built by Henderson of Partick, costing £1,565.); Sold 1923.
315	Brothers	43 ft 0 in (13.11 m)	1892	1911–1923	Cromarty	Sold 1923.
316	Unnamed	38 ft 0 in (11.58 m)	1892	1893	Montrose LB trials	(Note: 38 ft 0 in (11.58 m) x 9 ft 4 in (2.84 m) (12-oared) lifeboat, built by Henderson of Partick, costing £924.); Named City Masonic Club in 1897.
316	Unnamed	38 ft 0 in (11.58 m)	1892	1893–1897	Storage	Named City Masonic Club in 1897.
316	City Masonic Club	38 ft 0 in (11.58 m)	1892	1897–1910	Poole	(Note: Gift of the Freemasons of the City of London); Transferred to the Relief fleet, 1910. Sold 1918.
316	Reserve No. 7	38 ft 0 in (11.58 m)	1892	1910–1918	Relief fleet	Transferred to the Relief fleet, 1910. Sold 1918.
346	Henley	32 ft 0 in (9.75 m)	1892	1893–1918	Tramore	(Note: 32 ft 0 in (9.75 m) x 8 ft 0 in (2.44 m) (10-oared) lifeboat, legacy of Miss G. Henley of Highbury, built by Chambers and Colby of Lowestoft, costing £248.); Lightweight construction for a soft beach. Sold 1919.
359	Maude Pickup	43 ft 0 in (13.11 m)	1894	1894–1929	Fleetwood	(Note: 43 ft 0 in (13.11 m) x 12 ft 6 in (3.81 m) (10-oared) lifeboat, legacy of Mr J. Pickup of Southport, built by R. McAlister of Dumbarton, costing £875.); Sold 1930. Renamed Elissa. Last reported as a twin-screw lugger at Newcastle-upon-Tyne, 1939.
393	Samuel Fletcher of Manchester	36 ft 2 in (11.02 m)	1896	1896–1930	Blackpool	(Note: 36 ft 2 in (11.02 m) x 8 ft 10 in (2.69 m) (12-oared) lifeboat, estate of Mr S. Fletcher, built by Forrestt of Limehouse, London, costing £591.); Sold 1930. Stored and partially restored at Council Illuminations depot, Blackpool, January 2025.
409	Dunleary (Civil Service No. 7)	45 ft 0 in (13.72 m)	1898	1898–1913	Kingstown No. 2	(Note: 45 ft 0 in (13.72 m) x 12 ft 6 in (3.81 m) (10-oared) lifeboat, gift of the Civil Service LB fund, built by Hollwey of Dublin, costing £958.); Condemned and Sold, 1913.
414	Henry Richardson	43 ft 0 in (13.11 m)	1898	1898–1919	New Brighton No. 1	(Note: 43 ft 0 in (13.11 m) x 12 ft 6 in (3.81 m) (10-oared) lifeboat, legacy of Mr H. T. Richardson of Bala, built by Reynolds of Lowestoft, costing £694.); Sold 1919. Renamed Namouna. Converted to a houseboat, but broken up at Glasson Dock, 1978.
418	Margaret Platt of Stalybridge	38 ft 0 in (11.58 m)	1898	1898–1930	Pwllheli	(Note: 38 ft 0 in (11.58 m) x 9 ft 4 in (2.84 m) (12-oared) lifeboat, legacy of Mrs M. Platt of Stalybridge, built by S. Strickland of Dartmouth, costing £644.); Sold 1930. Renamed Freckles. Last reported at Pwllheli, 1932.
424	Elizabeth and Blanche	38 ft 0 in (11.58 m)	1899	1899–1908	Penzance	(Note: 38 ft 0 in (11.58 m) x 9 ft 6 in (2.90 m) (12-oared) lifeboat, gift of the Misses Smytheman of Albury, built by Chambers and Colby of Lowestoft, costing £753.); Sold 1922. Last reported in Falmouth, Cornwall, 1969.
424	Elizabeth and Blanche	38 ft 0 in (11.58 m)	1899	1908–1913	Newlyn	Sold 1922. Last reported in Falmouth, Cornwall, 1969.
424	Elizabeth and Blanche	38 ft 0 in (11.58 m)	1899	1913–1922	Penlee	Sold 1922. Last reported in Falmouth, Cornwall, 1969.
429	James Stevens No. 7	45 ft 0 in (13.72 m)	1899	1899–1912	Howth	(Note: 45 ft 0 in (13.72 m) x 12 ft 6 in (3.81 m) (10-oared) lifeboat, legacy of Mr J. Stevens of Birmingham, built by Thames Ironworks of Blackwall, London, costing £1,096.); Sold 1926.
429	James Stevens No. 7	45 ft 0 in (13.72 m)	1899	1913–1926	Howth	Sold 1926.
434	Henry Dundas	38 ft 0 in (11.58 m)	1899	1899–1919	St Mary's	(Note: 38 ft 0 in (11.58 m) x 9 ft 4 in (2.84 m) (12-oared) lifeboat, legacy of Mrs Dundas-Drummond of London, built by Thames Ironworks of Blackwall, London, costing £856.); Sold 1927.
434	Henry Dundas	38 ft 0 in (11.58 m)	1899	1919–1927	Angle	Sold 1927.
442	James Stevens No. 15	40 ft 0 in (12.19 m)	1900	1900–1921	Wexford	(Note: 40 ft 0 in (12.19 m) x 10 ft 0 in (3.05 m) (12-oared) lifeboat, legacy of Mr J. Stevens of Birmingham, built by Thames Ironworks of Blackwall, London, costing £1,295.); Sold 1921.
445	James Stevens No. 16	40 ft 0 in (12.19 m)	1900	1900–1930	Dungarvan Bay (Helvick Head)	(Note: 40 ft 0 in (12.19 m) x 11 ft 0 in (3.35 m) (12-oared) lifeboat, legacy of Mr J. Stevens of Birmingham, built by Thames Ironworks of Blackwall, London, costing £1,336.); Sold 1930. Last reported as the yacht Helvick Head at St Helier, Channel Islands, January 1972.
456	John Wesley	43 ft 0 in (13.11 m)	1901	1901–1922	Barry Dock	(Note: 43 ft 0 in (13.11 m) x 12 ft 6 in (3.81 m) (10-oared) lifeboat, gift of the John Wesley LB fund, via Rev Hargreaves and Jn. Cory, built by Thames Ironworks of Blackwall, London, costing £1,712.); Sold 1928. Last report as the motor yacht Dandy at Brixham, 1956.
456	Reserve No. 7E	43 ft 0 in (13.11 m)	1901	1922–1923	Relief fleet	Sold 1928. Last report as the motor yacht Dandy at Brixham, 1956.
456	John Wesley	43 ft 0 in (13.11 m)	1901	1923–1928	Cromarty	Sold 1928. Last report as the motor yacht Dandy at Brixham, 1956.
457	James Stevens No. 20	43 ft 0 in (13.11 m)	1901	1901–1920	Queenstown	(Note: 43 ft 0 in (13.11 m) x 12 ft 3 in (3.73 m) (10-oared) lifeboat, legacy of Mr J. Stevens of Birmingham, built by Thames Ironworks of Blackwall, London, costing £1,739.); Sold 1928. Last reported as the yacht Eternal Wave at Dartmouth in the 1970s.
457	Reserve No. 7B	43 ft 0 in (13.11 m)	1901	1920–1922	Relief fleet	Sold 1928. Last reported as the yacht Eternal Wave at Dartmouth in the 1970s.
457	James Stevens No. 20	43 ft 0 in (13.11 m)	1901	1923–1927	Fenit (Tralee Bay)	Sold 1928. Last reported as the yacht Eternal Wave at Dartmouth in the 1970s.
462	Thomas Fielden	40 ft 0 in (12.19 m)	1901	1901–1927	Barrow	(Note: 40 ft 0 in (12.19 m) x 11 ft 0 in (3.35 m) (12-oared) lifeboat, legacy of Mr S. J. and Mr J. Fielden of Todmorden, built by Thames Ironworks of Blackwall, London, costing £1,327.); Sold 1929.
462	Thomas Fielden	40 ft 0 in (12.19 m)	1901	1927–1929	Angle	Sold 1929.
462	Thomas Fielden	40 ft 0 in (12.19 m)	1901	1929–1929	Moelfre	Sold 1929.
463	Albert Edward	45 ft 0 in (13.72 m)	1901	1901–1912	Clacton-on-Sea	(Note: 45 ft 0 in (13.72 m) x 12 ft 6 in (3.81 m) (12-oared) lifeboat, gift of the United Grand Lodge of England, built by Thames Ironworks of Blackwall, London, costing £1,890. Single 40-bhp Tylor C 4-cyl. petrol engine motor conversion, 1912.); Motor conversion 1912. See:– 45ft Watson-class.
487	Wighton	38 ft 0 in (11.58 m)	1902	1902–1923	Torquay	(Note: 38 ft 0 in (11.58 m) x 9 ft 4 in (2.84 m) (12-oared) lifeboat, legacy of Mrs M. H. Wighton of Hornsey, built by Thames Ironworks of Blackwall, London, costing £926.); Sold 1923. Renamed Cavalla, reported derelict on the River Great Ouse, opposite Twentypence Marina, Wilburton, Ely, Cambridgeshire, June 2020.
488	Colonel Stock	38 ft 0 in (11.58 m)	1902	1902–1933	Weston-super-Mare	(Note: 38 ft 0 in (11.58 m) x 9 ft 4 in (2.84 m) (12-oared) lifeboat, legacy of Mrs A. S. Stock of Weston-super-Mare, built by Thames Ironworks of Blackwall, London, costing £891.); Sold 1933. Renamed Tova. At Broadness Creek, River Thames, October 1996, but believed broken up, February 2001.
497	William and Mary Devey	38 ft 0 in (11.58 m)	1902	1902–1923	Tenby	(Note: 38 ft 0 in (11.58 m) x 9 ft 4 in (2.84 m) (12-oared) lifeboat, legacy of Miss E. Devey of Tunbridge Wells, built by Thames Ironworks of Blackwall, London, costing £984.); Sold 1923.
505	William Roberts	40 ft 0 in (12.19 m)	1903	1903–1921	Little Haven	(Note: 40 ft 0 in (12.19 m) x 11 ft 0 in (3.35 m) (12-oared) lifeboat, legacy of Mr W. Roberts of Manchester, built by Thames Ironworks of Blackwall, London, costing £1,606.); Sold 1928. Renamed Quest. Broken up at Hayling Island, December 2009.
505	Reserve No. 7C	40 ft 0 in (12.19 m)	1903	1921–1922	Relief fleet	Sold 1928. Renamed Quest. Broken up at Hayling Island, December 2009.
505	Reserve No. 7C	40 ft 0 in (12.19 m)	1903	1923–1924	Southend-on-Sea	Sold 1928. Renamed Quest. Broken up at Hayling Island, December 2009.
505	Reserve No. 7C	40 ft 0 in (12.19 m)	1903	1924–1925	Relief fleet	Sold 1928. Renamed Quest. Broken up at Hayling Island, December 2009.
505	Reserve No. 7C	40 ft 0 in (12.19 m)	1903	1925–1926	Aberdeen No. 1	Sold 1928. Renamed Quest. Broken up at Hayling Island, December 2009.
505	Reserve No. 7C	40 ft 0 in (12.19 m)	1903	1926–1928	Fowey	Sold 1928. Renamed Quest. Broken up at Hayling Island, December 2009.
513	Fiern Watch	38 ft 0 in (11.58 m)	1903	1903–1924	Weymouth	(Note: 38 ft 0 in (11.58 m) x 9 ft 4 in (2.84 m) (12-oared) lifeboat, gift of Mr E. Homan of Finchley, built by Thames Ironworks of Blackwall, London, costing £1,023.); Sold 1925. Renamed Easting Down. Lost off Ijmuiden, Netherlands, August 1965.
513	Fiern Watch	38 ft 0 in (11.58 m)	1903	1924–1925	Relief fleet	Sold 1925. Renamed Easting Down. Lost off Ijmuiden, Netherlands, August 1965.
515	James, William and Caroline Courtney	35 ft 0 in (10.67 m)	1904	1904–1922	Polkerris	(Note: 35 ft 0 in (10.67 m) x 9 ft 0 in (2.74 m) (12-oared) lifeboat, legacy of Mrs C. Courtney of Exmouth, built by Thames Ironworks of Blackwall, London, costing £1,241.); Sold 1922. Renamed Grey Fox. Derelict at Anchor Bay moorings, Erith, October 2023.
517	Ann Fawcett	43 ft 0 in (13.11 m)	1904	1904–1912	Harwich	(Note: 43 ft 0 in (13.11 m) x 12 ft 6 in (3.81 m) (10-oared) lifeboat, legacy of Mrs A. Fawcett of London, built by Thames Ironworks of Blackwall, London, costing £1,711.); Renamed Dunleary when transferred to Kingstown.
517	Dunleary	43 ft 0 in (13.11 m)	1904	1913–1919	Kingstown	Sold 1920.
518	John Harling	43 ft 6 in (13.26 m)	1904	1904–1925	Southport No. 2	(Note: 43 ft 6 in (13.26 m) x 13 ft 3 in (4.04 m) (12-oared) lifeboat, funds from the trustees of Jon Harling of Southport, built by Thames Ironworks of Blackwall, London, costing £2,099.); Sold 1925. Renamed Pride of the Lake, and used on the Marine Lake at Southport. Broken up in 1958.
521	James and Mary Walker	38 ft 0 in (11.58 m)	1904	1904–1933	Anstruther	(Note: 38 ft 0 in (11.58 m) x 9 ft 4 in (2.84 m) (12-oared) lifeboat, legacy of Mrs M. A. Walker of West Calder, built by Thames Ironworks of Blackwall, London, costing £1,018.); Sold 1933. Renamed Cameronian, later Ishbara. Restored as James and Mary Walker, awaiting display location, at Anstruther, December 2024.
523	John Fortune	38 ft 0 in (11.58 m)	1904	1904–1914	Port Erroll	(Note: 38 ft 0 in (11.58 m) x 9 ft 4 in (2.84 m) (12-oared) lifeboat, legacy of Dr J. Fortune of Edinburgh, built by Thames Ironworks of Blackwall, London, costing £1,007.); Port Errol station closed 1914–1915. Sold 1923. Renamed Port Erroll, last reported as a yacht, lost in 1975.
523	Reserve No. 7A	38 ft 0 in (11.58 m)	1904	1914–1915	Relief fleet	Port Errol station closed 1914–1915. Sold 1923. Renamed Port Erroll, last reported as a yacht, lost in 1975.
523	Reserve No. 7A	38 ft 0 in (11.58 m)	1904	1915–1921	Port Erroll	Port Errol station closed 1914–1915. Sold 1923. Renamed Port Erroll, last reported as a yacht, lost in 1975.
523	Reserve No. 7A	38 ft 0 in (11.58 m)	1904	1921–1923	Relief fleet	Port Errol station closed 1914–1915. Sold 1923. Renamed Port Erroll, last reported as a yacht, lost in 1975.
525	Busbie	38 ft 0 in (11.58 m)	1904	1904–1929	Troon	(Note: 38 ft 0 in (11.58 m) x 9 ft 4 in (2.84 m) (12-oared) lifeboat, legacy of Mr H. R. C. Wallace of Busbie and Cloncaird, built by Thames Ironworks of Blackwall, London, costing £1,584.); Sold 1930.
528	James Cullen	38 ft 0 in (11.58 m)	1904	1904–1926	Bull Bay	(Note: 38 ft 0 in (11.58 m) x 9 ft 4 in (2.84 m) (12-oared) lifeboat, legacy of Miss M. Cullen of Nottingham, built by Thames Ironworks of Blackwall, London, costing £993.); Sold 1926. Renamed Emily, Vika, Meine Liebe. Last reported as the yacht Pride of Anglesey, and broken up at Rochester, Kent, June 1996.
529	John R. Ker	38 ft 0 in (11.58 m)	1904	1904–1930	Southend (Cantyre)	(Note: 38 ft 0 in (11.58 m) x 9 ft 4 in (2.84 m) (12-oared) lifeboat, gift of the late Mr R. Ker of Milngavie, built by Thames Ironworks of Blackwall, London, costing £1,100.); Sold 1930. Renamed Knot. Last reported as Knot II at York, 1975.
530	Oldham	38 ft 0 in (11.58 m)	1904	1904–1930	Abersoch	(Note: 38 ft 0 in (11.58 m) x 9 ft 4 in (2.84 m) (12-oared) lifeboat, gift of the Oldham LB fund, built by Thames Ironworks of Blackwall, London, costing £992.); Sold 1930. Reported derelict at Fleetwood, July 2025.
535	Charlie Medland	43 ft 0 in (13.11 m)	1904	1905–1924	The Mumbles	(Note: 43 ft 0 in (13.11 m) x 12 ft 6 in (3.81 m) (10-oared) lifeboat, legacy of Mr C. Medland of Clapham, built by Thames Ironworks of Blackwall, London, costing £1,694.); Sold 1939. Awaiting restoration at River Yonne, Migennes France, December 2024.
535	Charlie Medland	43 ft 0 in (13.11 m)	1904	1924–1928	Southend-on-Sea	Sold 1939. Awaiting restoration at River Yonne, Migennes France, December 2024.
535	Reserve No. 7E	43 ft 0 in (13.11 m)	1904	1928–1936	Relief fleet	Sold 1939. Awaiting restoration at River Yonne, Migennes France, December 2024.
535	Reserve No. 7E	43 ft 0 in (13.11 m)	1904	1936–1938	New Brighton	Sold 1939. Awaiting restoration at River Yonne, Migennes France, December 2024.
538	Jones-Gibb	38 ft 0 in (11.58 m)	1905	1905–1939	Barmouth	(Note: 38 ft 0 in (11.58 m) x 9 ft 4 in (2.84 m) (12-oared) lifeboat, gift of Mrs F. G. Smart of Tunbridge Wells, built by Thames Ironworks of Blackwall, London, costing £1,032.); Sold 1939. Renamed Thrift, later Saor Alba. Last reported as Jones-Gibb at Dauntless boatyard, Canvey Island, June 2021.
541	James Finlayson	35 ft 0 in (10.67 m)	1905	1905–1923	Lossiemouth	(Note: 35 ft 0 in (10.67 m) x 9 ft (2.7 m) (10-oared) lifeboat, legacy of Mr J. Finlayson of Stirling, built by Thames Ironworks of Blackwall, London, costing £1,247.); Sold 1933. Renamed Tamesis. Last reported as Adele Jeanne at Fareham, 1980.
541	James Finlayson	35 ft 0 in (10.67 m)	1905	1923–1924	Gorleston No.2	Sold 1933. Renamed Tamesis. Last reported as Adele Jeanne at Fareham, 1980.
541	Reserve No. 7A	35 ft 0 in (10.67 m)	1905	1925–1933	Relief fleet	Sold 1933. Renamed Tamesis. Last reported as Adele Jeanne at Fareham, 1980.
544	Civil Service No. 5	38 ft 0 in (11.58 m)	1905	1905–1931	Maryport	(Note: 38 ft 0 in (11.58 m) x 9 ft 4 in (2.84 m) (10-oared) lifeboat, gift of the Civil Service LB fund, built by Thames Ironworks of Blackwall, London, costing £1,011.); Sold 1931. Last reported at Helford River, Gweek, December 2002.
550	Anne Miles	43 ft 0 in (13.11 m)	1905	1906–1926	Longhope	(Note: 43 ft 0 in (13.11 m) x 12 ft 6 in (3.81 m) (10-oared) lifeboat, gift of Miss A. Miles of West Hampstead, built by Thames Ironworks of Blackwall, London, costing £1,759.); Sold 1936. Renamed Zlata. Last reported as the ketch Westering at Portsmouth in 1968.
550	Anne Miles	43 ft 0 in (13.11 m)	1905	1926–1930	Howth	Sold 1936. Renamed Zlata. Last reported as the ketch Westering at Portsmouth in 1968.
550	Anne Miles	43 ft 0 in (13.11 m)	1905	1930–1936	New Brighton No. 2	Sold 1936. Renamed Zlata. Last reported as the ketch Westering at Portsmouth in 1968.
581	Maria Stephenson	38 ft 0 in (11.58 m)	1907	1908–1922	Buckie	(Note: 38 ft 0 in (11.58 m) x 9 ft 4 in (2.84 m) (12-oared) lifeboat, legacy of Miss M. M. Stephenson of Chelsea, London, built by Thames Ironworks of Blackwall, London, costing £1,121.); Sold 1936.
581	Reserve No. 7D	38 ft 0 in (11.58 m)	1907	1922–1929	Relief fleet	Sold 1936.
581	Reserve No. 7D	38 ft 0 in (11.58 m)	1907	1929–1930	Moelfre	Sold 1936.
581	Reserve No. 7D	38 ft 0 in (11.58 m)	1907	1930–1931	Abersoch	Sold 1936.
581	Reserve No. 7D	38 ft 0 in (11.58 m)	1907	1931–1933	Relief fleet	Sold 1936.
583	Charles Henry Ashley	38 ft 0 in (11.58 m)	1907	1907–1932	Cemaes	(Note: 38 ft 0 in (11.58 m) x 9 ft 4 in (2.84 m) (12-oared) lifeboat, legacy of Mr C. C. Ashley of Menton, France, built by Thames Ironworks of Blackwall, London, costing £1,090.); Sold 1932. Restored and displayed afloat at Cemaes since 2009. Undergoing restoration for static display, April 2025.
585	Sarah Austin	40 ft 0 in (12.19 m)	1908	1909–1929	Thurso	(Note: 40 ft 0 in (12.19 m) x 11 ft 0 in (3.35 m) (12-oared) lifeboat, legacy of Miss S. Austin of Tottenham, built by Thames Ironworks of Blackwall, London, costing £1,589.); Damaged when it broke adrift, 11 February 1929. Sold July 1935
585	Sarah Austin	40 ft 0 in (12.19 m)	1908	1929–1935	Relief fleet	Damaged when it broke adrift, 11 February 1929. Sold July 1935
590	Charles Deere James	38 ft 0 in (11.58 m)	1909	1909–1920	St Agnes (IOS)	(Note: 38 ft 0 in (11.58 m) x 9 ft 4 in (2.84 m) (10-oared) lifeboat, gift of Mrs S. C. Guthrie of Tunbridge Wells, built by Thames Ironworks of Blackwall, London, costing £1,082.); Sold 1934. Renamed Silver Cloud. Destroyed in Cherbourg harbour in the 1950s.
590	Reserve No. 7	38 ft 0 in (11.58 m)	1909	1920–1934	Relief fleet	Sold 1934. Renamed Silver Cloud. Destroyed in Cherbourg harbour in the 1950s.
605	Charles and Eliza Laura	40 ft 0 in (12.19 m)	1910	1910–1929	Moelfre	(Note: 40 ft 0 in (12.19 m) x 11 ft 0 in (3.35 m) (12-oared) lifeboat, legacy of Miss S. Austin of Tottenham, built by Thames Ironworks of Blackwall, London, costing £1,589.); Sold 1929. Renamed Salvor. In storage near Duns, April 2024.
637	Staughton	40 ft 0 in (12.19 m)	1915	1915–1919	Relief fleet	(Note: 40 ft 0 in (12.19 m) x 11 ft 0 in (3.35 m) (12-oared) lifeboat, legacy of Miss M. Staughton of Bedford, part built by Thames Ironworks of Blackwall, London, completed by S. E. Saunders of Cowes, costing £2,239.); Sold 1931. Renamed Viater (BS 118). Broken up at Porth Penrhyn in 2000.
637	Staughton	40 ft 0 in (12.19 m)	1915	1919–1930	New Brighton No. 2	Sold 1931. Renamed Viater (BS 118). Broken up at Porth Penrhyn in 2000.

== See also ==
- Watson-class lifeboat
- Royal National Lifeboat Institution lifeboats
