= Tramore Lifeboat Station =

RNLI lifeboat station in County Waterford, Ireland

- Tramore Lifeboat Station

- Location within Ireland

General information
- Type: RNLI Lifeboat Station
- Location: The Pier, Newtown,, Tramore, County Waterford, Ireland
- Coordinates: 52°09′14.8″N 7°09′37.9″W
- Opened: 1858–1924; 1964–present
- Owner: Royal National Lifeboat Institution

Website
- Tramore RNLI Lifeboat Station

Tramore Lifeboat Station is located on The Cove, near The Pier at Newtown, a suburb of Tramore, a seaside town in County Waterford, approximately 14 kilometres (8.7 mi) south of Waterford, on the south coast of Ireland.

A lifeboat station was first established at Tramore in 1858 by the Royal National Lifeboat Institution (RNLI).

The station currently operates the D-class (IB1) Inshore lifeboat, Emma Vosper (D-915), on station since 2026.

== History ==
Ever since its founding in 1824, the Royal National Institution for the Preservation of Life from Shipwreck (RNIPLS), later to become the RNLI in 1854, would award medals for deeds of gallantry at sea, even if no lifeboats were involved.

On 25 November 1835, the RNIPLS Silver Medal was awarded to farmer Pat Coffey, when he rode his horse out in the surf, to get a line to the French schooner Les Deux Soeurs, wrecked in Tramore Bay on passage from Nice to Rouen. All the crew were saved.

The vessel Prince Regent was wrecked in Tramore Bay on 22 June 1839, whilst on passage from Newport, Wales to New York, Coastguard boatman John Weblin swam out through the surf, to get a line to the ship, and all 40 crew and passengers were saved. Weblin was also awarded the RNIPLS Silver Medal.

When the French vessel Capricieux ran aground at Tramore on 25 January 1858, whilst on passage from Llanelli to Saint-Malo, one crew man was lost, and two local fishermen, John Fitzgerald and Thomas Crotty, were drowned, when their small boat capsized while trying to effect a rescue. This was finally the catalyst for the local residents of Tramore to appeal to the RNLI, for a lifeboat to be placed at Tramore.

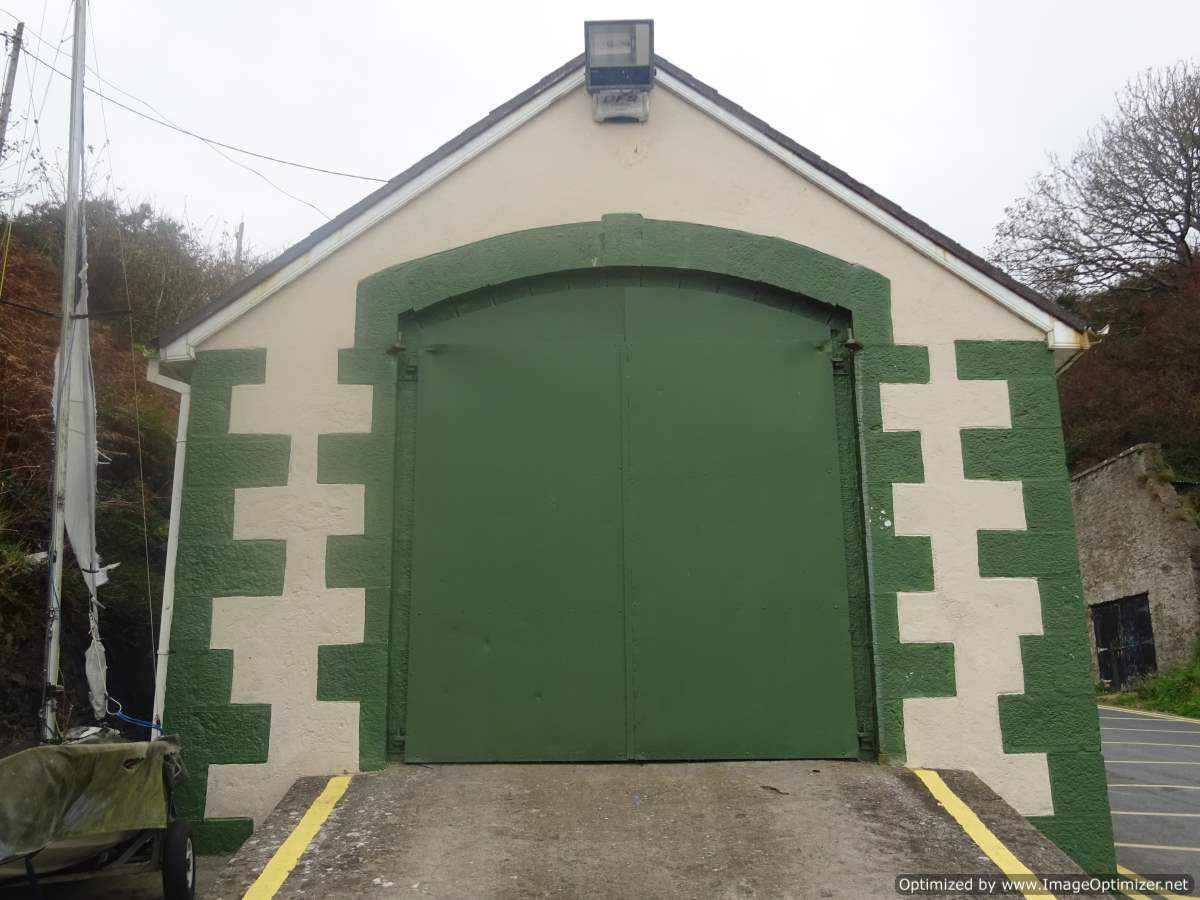
1858 Tramore Lifeboat House

A local committee was established, for the management of the station, and to undertake the necessary local fundraising. A 30-foot 6-oared unnamed self-righting 'Pulling and Sailing' (P&S) lifeboat, one with oars and sails, was placed at Tramore in 1858, along with a carriage for transportation. A boathouse was constructed at Lady Elizabeth's Cove, costing £136-8s-9d.

Between 1861 and 1875, no fewer than 11 RNLI Silver Medals for gallantry were awarded at Tramore:

- 17 February 1861 (4), for the rescue of the four crew of the brig San Spiridione of Galaxidi.
- 22 January 1862 (2), when 24 people were saved from the ship Queen of Commerce.
- 3 December 1866 (1), for the rescue of the crew of five from the schooner Jane.
- 12 January 1868 (2), for the rescue of 21 people of the ship Oasis of Liverpool.
- 7 October 1869, a Third-Service clasp was awarded to Coxswain Richard O Johns in recognition of his long service.
- 3 January 1875, (1), when seven men were saved from the schooner Fanny of Salcombe.

Alterations costing £390 were completed at the boathouse in 1894, but in 1899, due to the sea encroaching on the boathouse, the lifeboat was relocated to a new building on Long House Lane in the Riverstown district of Tramore. The station building still exists, the road now being Riverstown Road. The area around the old boathouse at Lady Elizabeth's Cove was later protected, when a new pier of grey limestone slabs with a concrete capping was built in 1907, with a north wall added later.

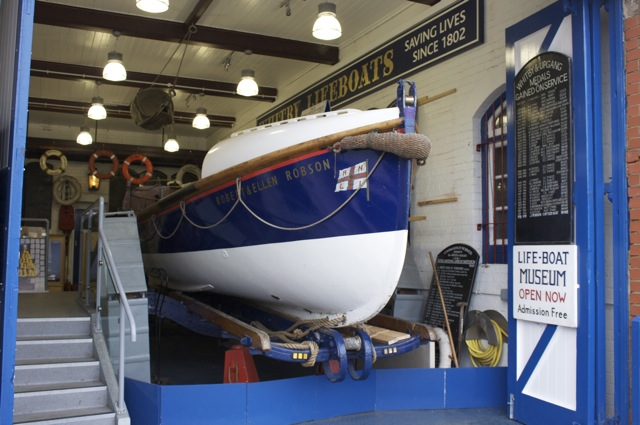
Robert and Ellen Robson (ON 669)

The Tramore lifeboat station was closed temporarily in 1921. In 1923, the lifeboat on station, Robert and Ellen Robson (ON 669), was removed, and allocated to Aberdeen No.2 Lifeboat Station. Tramore Lifeboat Station closed officially in 1924, after a motor-powered lifeboat was placed at Dunmore East, approximately 10 km (6.2 mi) to the east.

After service at Tramore, Aberdeen and then Whitby, the Robert and Ellen Robson (ON 669) was fully restored, and now takes pride of place at the RNLI Museum in Whitby.

== Inshore station ==
In 1964, in response to an increasing amount of water-based leisure activity, the RNLI placed 25 small fast Inshore lifeboats around the shores of the UK and Ireland. These were easily launched with just a few people, ideal to respond quickly to local emergencies.

More stations were opened, and in June 1964, the lifeboat station at Tramore was re-established back at Lady Elizabeth's Cove, with the arrival of a D-class (RFD PB16) Inshore lifeboat, the first Inshore lifeboat in Ireland. The number of the first boat is unrecorded, but in 1965, the unnamed (D-74) was placed on service.

'The Thanks of the Institution inscribed on Vellum' were accorded to Frank Partridge, Sean Walsh and David Kenneally in 1973, for the rescue of a boy stranded on rocks in Ronan's Bay, and to Noel Power in 1977, for the attempt to rescue a man who had fallen from a cliff. Doctor Hugh O'Brien-Moran was accorded a special Doctor's Vellum, for his efforts on the same occasion in 1977.

A new larger boathouse was constructed in 1996, further up the road from the small harbour, additionally providing up-to-date crew facilities. From 28 November 1996, the Inshore boat was placed on service all-year-round.

Helm Paul Tuohy was accorded 'The Thanks of the Institution inscribed on Vellum', for the rescue of a surfer on 6 June 1997.

In 2015, Tra Mhor (D-643) was retired. During its time on service since 30 June 2005, the boat had been launched 127 times and rescued 100 people. The replacement lifeboat was a 25-knot D-class (IB1). The €62,000 boat was funded from the estate of the late Mrs Ivy Purchase, known as Isabella, of Midhurst, West Sussex, a long-time supporter of the RNLI, until her death in 2012. At a ceremony at the National Lifeguard Training Centre in Tramore on Saturday 12 September 2015, Mrs Sally Mongey, wife of the late Finn Mongey, former Lifeboat Operations Manager at Tramore, named the lifeboat Isabella Purchase (D-781).

In 2026, Tramore received their latest D-class Inshore lifeboat, Emma Vosper (D-915).

== Station honours ==
The following are awards made at Tramore:

- RNIPLS Silver Medal
  Pat Coffey, farmer – 1835
  John Weblin, Boatman, H.M. Coastguard, Ballymacaw – 1839
- RNLI Silver Medal
  James Budd, Honorary Secretary – 1861
  Richard O. Johns, Coxswain – 1861
  William Morris Reade – 1861
  Alfred Stephens, Boatman, H.M. Coastguard, Tramore – 1861
  John Donovan, Chief Boatman, H.M. Coastguard, Old Head – 1862
  James Gough, fisherman – 1862
  William Nelson, RN, commanding H.M. Coastguard Cruiser Eliza – 1867
  Richard O. Johns, Coxswain – 1868 (Second-Service clasp)
  Martin Norris, crew member – 1868
  Richard O. Johns, Coxswain – 1869 (Third-Service clasp)
  Stephen Pilcher, Coxswain – 1875
- 'The Thanks of the Institution inscribed on Vellum'
  Frank Partridge, Helm – 1973
  Sean Walsh, crew member – 1973
  David Kenneally, crew member – 1973
  Noel I. Power, Helm – 1977
  Paul Tuohy, Helm – 1997
- A special certificate on Vellum
  Doctor Hugh O'Brien-Moran – 1977
- Vellum service certificate
  John D. Palmer, crew member – 1977
- 'A Framed Letter of Thanks signed by the Chairman of the Institution'
  Garda John Lawton – 1977

== Roll of honour ==
In memory of those lost whilst serving at Tramore:

- Lost when their small boat capsized during an attempt to rescue the crew of a French vessel, 25 January 1858.
  Thomas Crotty, fisherman
  John Fitzgerald, fisherman

== Tramore lifeboats ==
=== Pulling and Sailing (P&S) lifeboats ===
ON (Note: ON is the RNLI's Official Number of the boat.)	Name	Built	On station	Class	Comments
Pre-333	Unnamed	1858	1858–1865	30-foot Peake self-righting (P&S)	(Note: 30 ft 0 in (9.14 m) x 6 ft 6 in (1.98 m) (6-oared) Peake-class self-righting (P&S) lifeboat, funded by the RNLI, built by Forrest of Limehouse, London, costing £136.); Transferred to Brighstone Grange and named Rescue.
Pre-430	Tom Egan	1865	1865–1880	32-foot Prowse self-righting (P&S)	(Note: 32 ft 0 in (9.75 m) x 7 ft 4 in (2.24 m) (10-oared) Prowse-class self-righting (P&S) lifeboat, funded by the Cambridge University Boat Club, built by Forrest of Limehouse, London, costing £210.); Broken up in 1881.
Pre-650	Alfred Trower	1880	1880–1890	34-foot self-righting (P&S)	(Note: 34 ft 0 in (10.36 m) x 8 ft 0 in (2.44 m) (10-oared) self-righting (P&S) lifeboat, gift of Mr H Trower and friends of London, built by Woolfe of Shadwell, London, costing £363.); Sold in 1893, used for demonstration purposes at Gainsborough until 1908.
280	Henley	1889	1889–1893	30-foot 3in Whaleboat	(Note: 30 ft 3 in (9.22 m) x 8 ft 1 in (2.46 m) (10-oared) non-self-righting Whaleboat, legacy of Mrs G. Henley of Highbury, built by Woolfe of Shadwell, London, costing £205.); Sold in 1893.
346	Henley	1892	1893–1918	32-foot Watson (P&S)	(Note: 32 ft 0 in (9.75 m) x 8 ft 0 in (2.44 m) (10-oared) Watson-class non-self-righting (P&S) lifeboat, legacy of Mrs G. Henley of Highbury, built by Chambers and Colby of Lowestoft, costing £248.); Sold in 1919.
669	Robert and Ellen Robson	1918	1918–1923	34-foot Dungeness self-righting (P&S)	(Note: 34 ft 0 in (10.36 m) x 8 ft 0 in (2.44 m) (10-oared) Dungeness-class (Rubie) self-righting (P&S) lifeboat, legacy of Mr R Robson, built by S. E. Saunders of Cowes, costing £966.); Transferred to Aberdeen No. 2.

Station Closed, 1924
Pre ON numbers are unofficial numbers used by the Lifeboat Enthusiasts' Society to reference early lifeboats not included on the official RNLI list.

=== Inshore lifeboats ===
Op.No. (Note: Op.No. is the RNLI's Operational Number of the boat carried on the hull.)	Name	On station	Class	Comments
–	Unnamed	1964	D-class (RFD PB16)	
D-74	Unnamed	1965–1967	D-class (RFD PB16)	
D-163	Unnamed	1968–1978	D-class (RFD PB16)	
D-179	Unnamed	1978–1979	D-class (RFD PB16)	
D-269	Unnamed	1980–1988	D-class (RFD PB16)	
D-375	Alice	1988–1996	D-class (EA16)	
D-511	Margaret	1996–2005	D-class (EA16)	
D-643	Tra Mhor	2005–2015	D-class (IB1)	
D-781	Isabella Purchase	2015–2026	D-class (IB1)	
D-781	Emma Vosper	2026–	D-class (IB1)	

== See also ==
- List of RNLI stations
- List of former RNLI stations
- Royal National Lifeboat Institution lifeboats

== Sources ==
- Leonard, Richie; Denton, Tony (2025). Lifeboat Enthusiasts Handbook 2025. Lifeboats Enthusiasts' Society.
- Leonard, Richie; Denton, Tony (2026). Lifeboat Enthusiasts Handbook 2026. Lifeboats Enthusiasts' Society.
