= Carrignafoy =

Carrignafoy Irish: Currach an Eich Bhuí
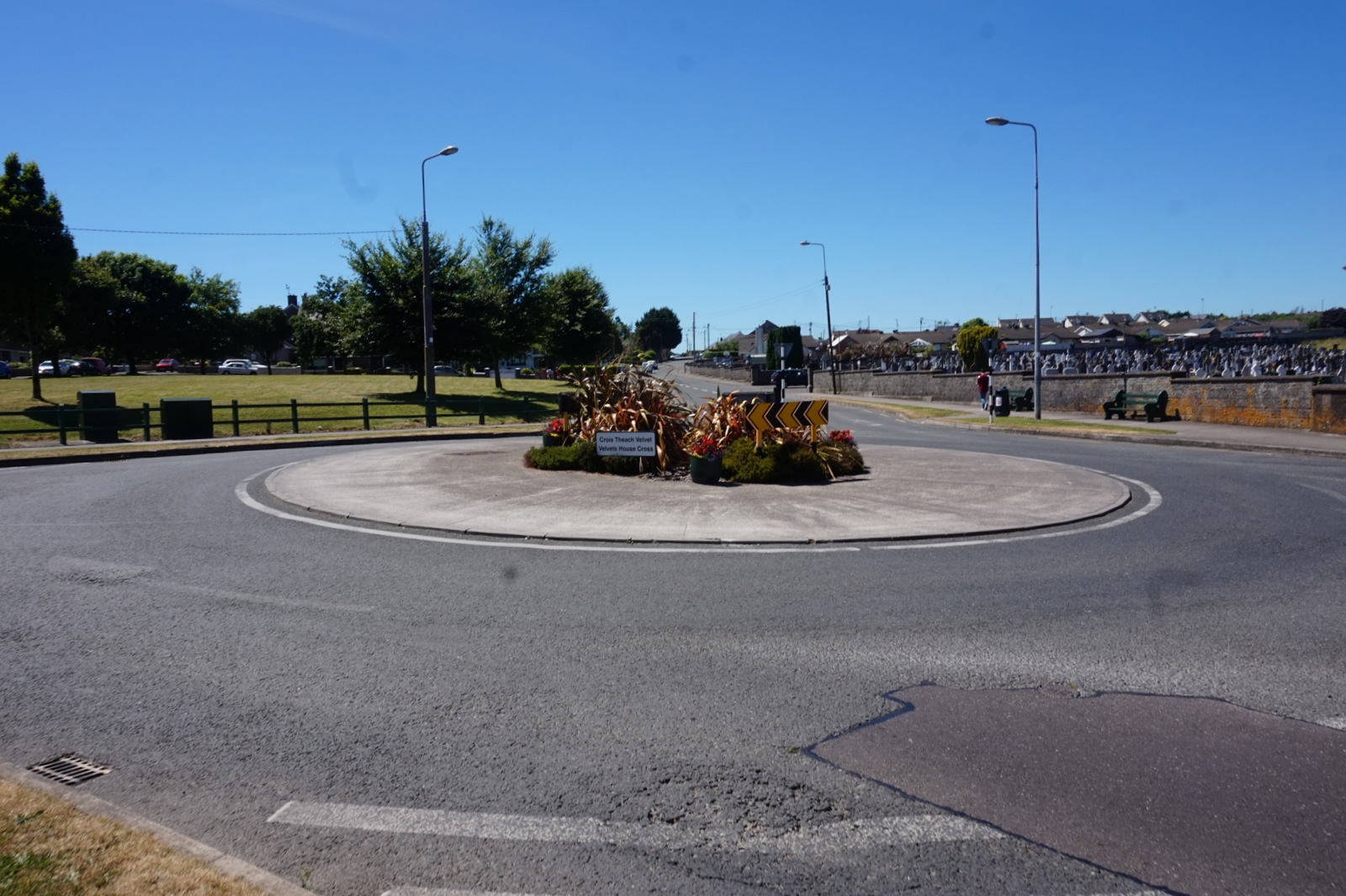
- Roundabout and cemetery in Carrignafoy

- Carrignafoy shown within Ireland
- Coordinates: 51°51′28″N 8°17′18″W
- Country: Ireland
- County: County Cork
- Barony: Barrymore
- Civil parish: Templerobin

Area
  - Total: 133 ha (328 acres)

Carrignafoy (Irish: Currach an Eich Bhuí) is a townland on the Great Island in Cork Harbour, Ireland. It extends from the peripheries of Cobh town centre to the countryside areas which lead into Cuskinny and Ballymore. It contains a number of housing estates, and five schools are located in this area. A leisure centre was opened in 2006 on the site of the old swimming pool in Carrignafoy.

The area includes 'Top of the Hill', a hillside area close to Cobh town centre, which is a centre for commercial and leisure activities in Cobh.

== See also ==
- List of townlands of the Barony of Barrymore
