= Cloughey Lifeboat Station =

Former RNLI lifeboat station in County Down, Northern Ireland

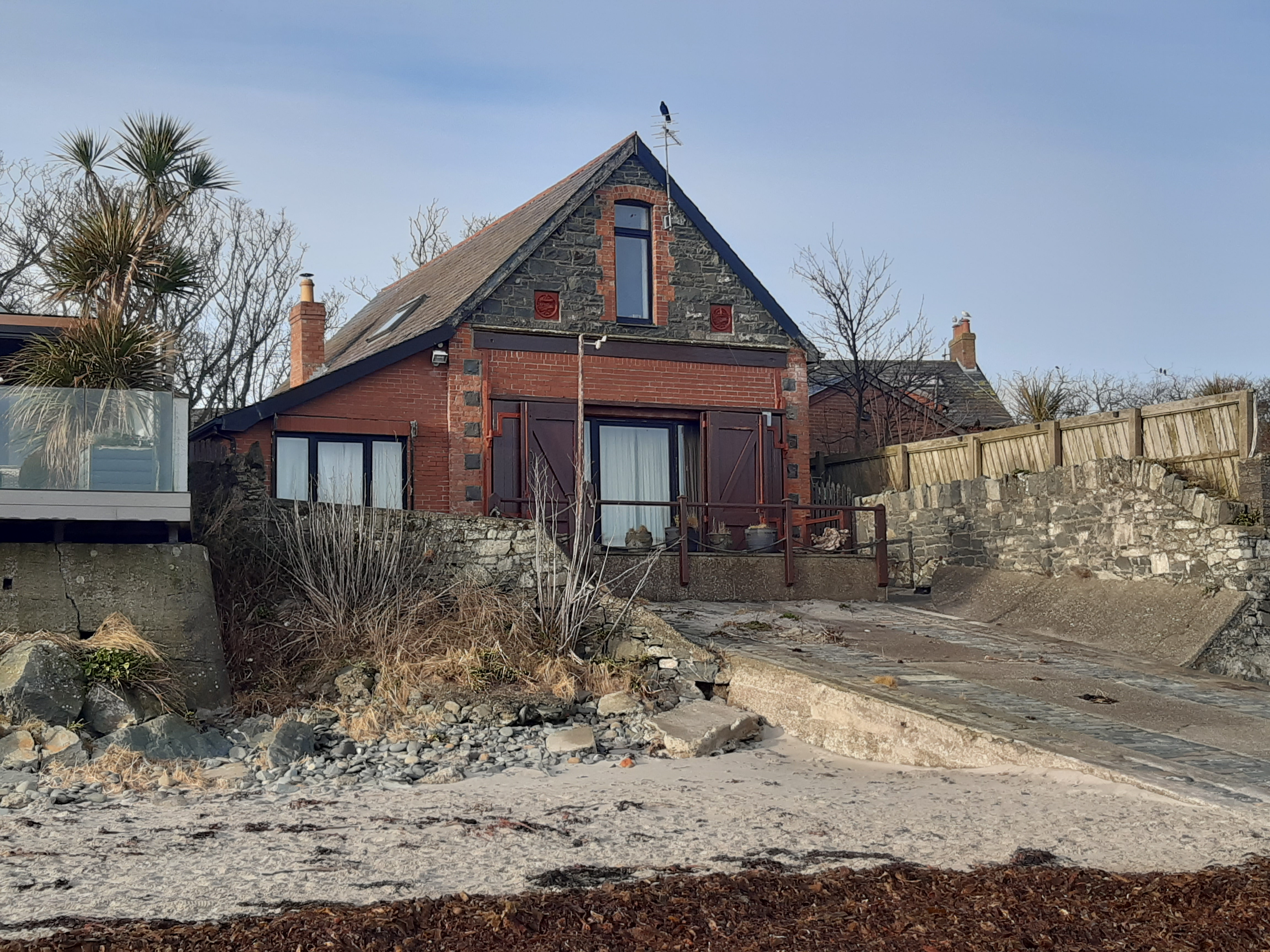
- Cloughey Lifeboat Station

- Location within Northern Ireland
- Alternative names: Cloughie-Portavogie Lifeboat Station

General information
- Status: Closed
- Type: RNLI Lifeboat Station
- Location: 1 Manse Road, Cloghy, County Down, BT22 1HR, Northern Ireland
- Coordinates: 54°25′41.1″N 5°28′49.6″W
- Opened: 1885 Cloughey; 1965 Cloughey-Portavogie
- Closed: 1981
- Owner: Now a private residence

Cloughey Lifeboat Station was located on Manse Road, in Cloghy (Cloughey), a small village at the southern end of the Ards Peninsula, in County Down, situated midway between Ballywalter, and the entrance to Strangford Lough, on the east coast of Northern Ireland.

A lifeboat station was established at Cloughey in 1885 by the Royal National Lifeboat Institution (RNLI).

Cloughie-Portavogie Lifeboat Station was established in 1965, when a new larger lifeboat was placed on service, operated from Portavogie harbour by Cloughey crew. After a further 13 years on station, the Cloughie-Portavogie lifeboat was placed in temporary storage in 1978, due to harbour works. However, the lifeboat never returned to service, and the station closed in 1981.

== History ==
Following a request by local residents for a lifeboat at Cloughey, and with the consideration of there being plenty of good boatmen to form a crew, at a meeting of the RNLI committee of management on Thursday 3 May 1883, it was resolved to establish a lifeboat station at "Cloghy Bay", Ireland. It was also decided to appropriate to the station, part of the legacy of the late Mrs Bradshaw of Reading, Berkshire.

In 1881, the Institution was the recipient of the bequest of £1,500 from the late Mrs. S. H. Bradshaw. The funds were for the provision of three lifeboats:

- Faith (ON 94), Cloughey (1885–1906)
- Hope (ON 82), Castletown (1885–1896)
- Charity (ON 96), Drogheda No.2, (1885–1901)

In the RNLI journal 'The Lifeboat' of November 1885, it was reported that Faith (ON 94), a 34-foot self-righting 'Pulling and Sailing' (P&S) lifeboat, one with sails and (10) oars, which had just won the prize for the best lifeboat at the International Fisheries Exhibition, had been conveyed to Cloughey, along with its transporting carriage, where a boathouse had been constructed by local builder Mr N. Parkinson, at a cost of £451-2s-6d.

When the Cloughey lifeboat attended the barque Beaconsfield, bound for Glasgow with a cargo of teak, when she stranded on the ridge at North Bock on 9 April 1898, only two of the 16 crew would leave the vessel. The rest insisted they take their kit, which was impossible. The following day, in worsening conditions, the lifeboat went out again, and brought ashore seven crew, the remaining seven coming ashore in the ship's boat, with the assistance of lifeboat crew.

With a short spell away from the station for modifications, after concerns were raised about the self-righting capabilities following the Southport and St Anne's lifeboats disaster, the Faith served at Cloughey until 1906, launching 32 times, and saving 54 lives. She was replaced by the John (ON 553), a 35-foot Liverpool-class (P&S) lifeboat, funded from the legacy of the late Mr John Alexander Hay of Cheltenham, the monies also funding the Marianne (ON 556), which was placed at Newcastle.

The John was launched to the aid of the barque Croisset of Rouen on 14 November 1908. She was on passage to Glasgow with a cargo of nickel, when she ran aground on South Rock in hurricane force conditions. The lifeboat made several trips to the vessel, rescuing all 26 people on board. A "Gold Medal (second class)" was awarded to both the Coxswain and the Chief Officer of H.M. Coastguard by the French Government, with the remaining crew and coastguards being awarded their "Silver Medal (first class)", the report of a Paris newspaper being replicated in the Irish News.

On 11 January 1924, with the Coxswain John Young away, and his brother and Second Coxswain Robert C. Young seriously ill, the third brother Andrew would leave Robert's bedside when the call came at 23:30, and head out with the lifeboat as Acting Coxswain, into a strong south-east gale. After standing by in poor conditions until daybreak, 5 men were rescued from the rigging of the sunken brigantine Helgoland. Andrew would discover on his return, that his brother Robert had died two hours after the lifeboat was launched. Witnessing the rescue, the Inspector of Coastguards reported "it was the finest piece of seamanship I have ever seen". Andrew Young was awarded the RNLI Bronze Medal.

In the 46 years since 1885, 189 lives had been saved by the pulling and sailing lifeboats at Cloughey. In 1931, a motor-powered lifeboat arrived on station. At a ceremony on 19 September 1931, a service of dedication was given by the Rev. J. C. Paton, MC DD. Funded from the 1898 legacy of the late Rev W. S. F. Maynard, of Gressingham, Lancashire, the lifeboat was named William Maynard (ON 746), after his father. The legacy had funded a previous lifeboat, William Maynard (ON 493), stationed at Skerries between 1903 and 1930. Andrew Young would be the first coxswain of the new boat.

The William Maynard had been scheduled for replacement in 1937. However, the Herbert John (ON 796) was destroyed in a fire at the Groves and Guttridge boatbuilders, whilst awaiting to be shipped to Cloughey. It would be a further two years before Herbert John (ON 825) was ready.

Before the Herbert John (ON 825) arrived on service, in difficult conditions, and 15 feet (4.6 m) seas, the William Maynard was launched at 22:00 on 17 June 1939, to the Aruntzazu-Mendi of Bilbao, which had wrecked earlier in the day. Arriving at the vessel, the lifeboat had to veer down stern first, before a line could be made to pull the lifeboat close. 11 salvage men on board were rescued. Coxswain Robert Young was awarded the RNLI Silver Medal, with mechanic George Young receiving a bronze medal.

The Herbert John (ON 825) arrived at Cloughey later in 1939. The 35-foot 6in Liverpool-class lifeboat, costing £4,054, was funded from the legacies of Mrs S M Poland of Brockham Green, Betchworth, and Miss B. A. Athill of St Johns Wood. Herbert John served through the Second World War Cloughey from 1939 to 1952, launched 46 times on service, and saved 67 lives.

On 15 January 1962, the Moelfre lifeboat Watkin Williams (ON 922) was launched at 20:35, to the aid of the Dutch coaster Frida Blokzijl of Vlaardingen, drifting with steering gear failure. Temporary repairs were effected, and the boat was escorted to Moelfre Bay. The Cloughey lifeboat Constance Calverley (ON 902) would be launched nearly two months later on 7 March 1962, to the Frida Blokzijl, which had again suffered steering gear failure, this time near Strangford Lough, in a south-east gale, and was using her engines just to stay off the shore. Seven attempts were made by the lifeboat to get along side, but only four crew were rescued, when the Master insisted on staying on board. Three hours later, after the weather deteriorated, the lifeboat returned and took off the Master. Coxswain Walter Semple was awarded the RNLI Bronze Medal, with other awards and certificates to the crew.

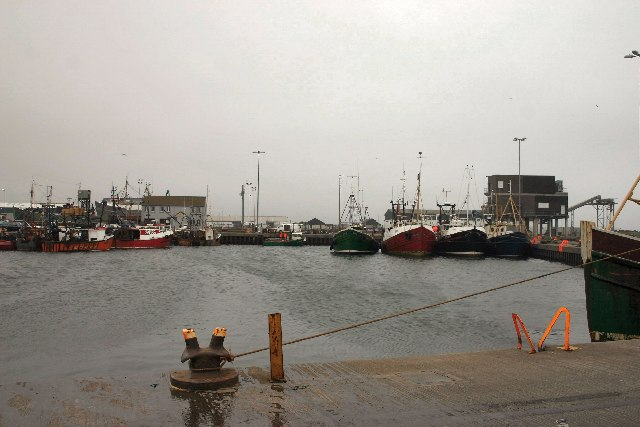
Portavogie Harbour

Lifeboat launching ceased at Cloughey in 1965, following the arrival of the larger 41-foot Watson-class lifeboat, the Glencoe, Glasgow (ON 857). In the 80 years of operations since 1885, the Cloughey lifeboats had been launched from there 152 times, saving the lives of 311 people. The new lifeboat was moored afloat at Portavogie harbour, and the station became known as Cloughey-Portavogie Lifeboat Station, with the lifeboat still operated by the existing Cloughey crew.

After being in service for a further 13 years, the Glencoe, Glasgow was initially placed into storage in 1978 whilst harbour development works took place at Portavogie, but was sold from service in 1979.

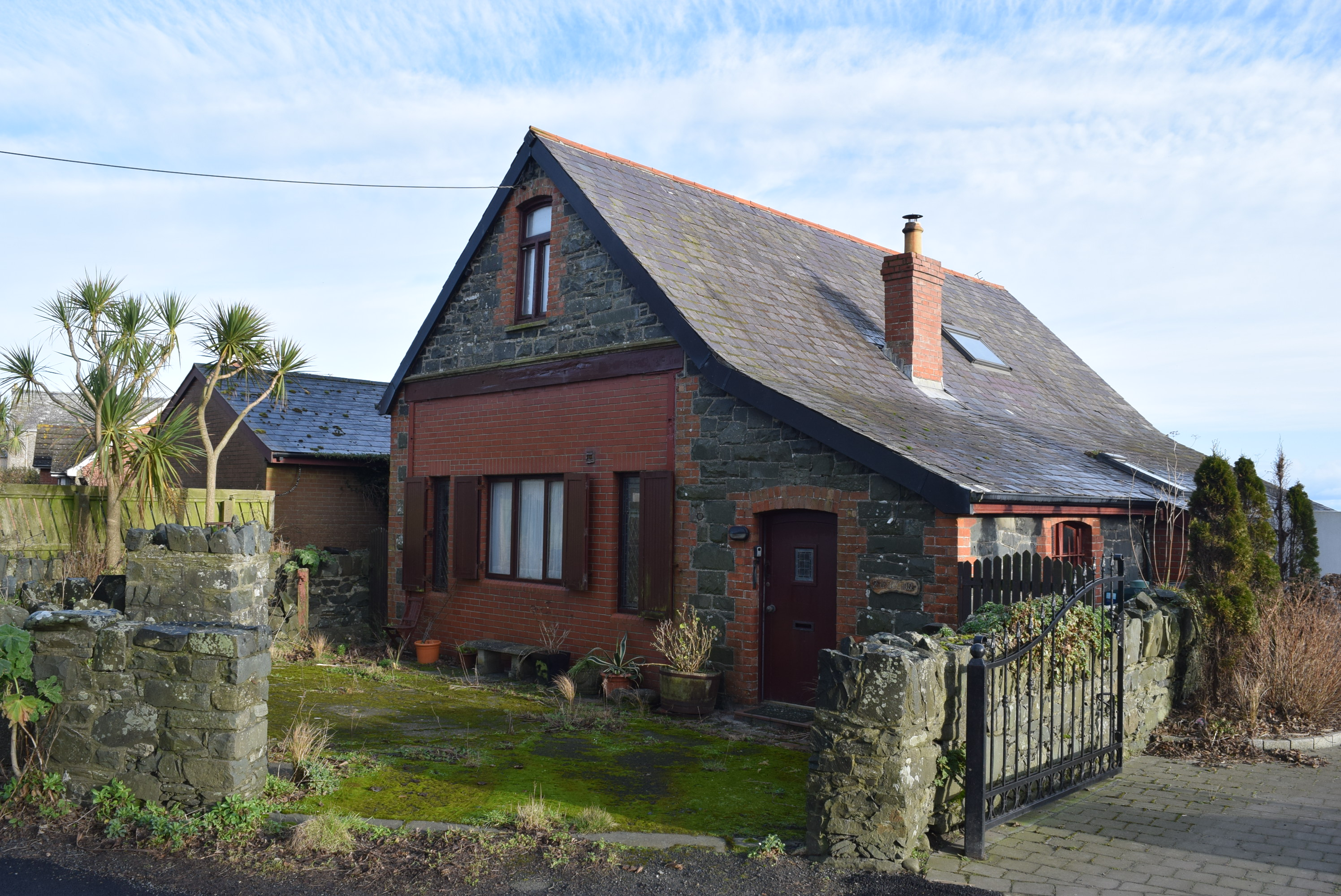
Former Cloughey lifeboat house

Harbour works continued into the 1980s. With All-weather lifeboats located at Newcastle to the south, and at Donaghadee to the north, and also with a newly opened Inshore lifeboat station covering Strangford Lough at Portaferry, the decision was taken to close Cloughey-Portavogie Lifeboat Station on 30 September 1981.

The lifeboat house at Cloughey is now a private residence. The last lifeboat on station, the Glencoe, Glasgow (ON 857), was last reported at Burghead Harbour in 2019. The Henry John (ON 825) was fully restored, and was last reported at Weymouth Marina in May 2024. The Cloughey and Cloughie-Portavogie lifeboat service boards can be found on display at Portaferry Lifeboat Station.

== Station honours ==
The following are awards made at Cloughey.

- Gold Medal (second class), awarded by the Government of France
  Robert C. Young, Coxswain – 1908
  Edwin Cupman, Chief Officer, H.M. Coastguard – 1908
- RNLI Silver Medal
  Robert Young, Coxswain – 1939
- Silver Medal, (first class), awarded by the Government of France
  John Young, Assistant Coxswain – 1908
  Andrew Young, crew member – 1908
  David Young, crew member – 1908
  Mr Beggs, crew member – 1908
  Mr Drysdale, crew member – 1908
  James Donnan, crew member – 1908
  William Donnan, crew member – 1908
  Mr Palmer, crew member – 1908
  Mr McNamara, crew member – 1908
  Mr Rose, H.M. Coastguard – 1908
  Mr Solway, H.M. Coastguard – 1908
  Mr Taylor, H.M. Coastguard – 1908
- RNLI Bronze Medal
  Andrew Young, Acting Coxswain – 1924
  George Young, Mechanic – 1939
  Walter Semple, Coxswain – 1962
- The Thanks of the Institution inscribed on Vellum
  George M. Young, Coxswain – 1950
  George M. Young, Mechanic – 1962
- Medal Service Certificate
  Walter Beggs, crew member – 1962
  George Calvert, crew member – 1962
  John Donnan, crew member – 1962
  James Master, crew member – 1962
  Archie Watts, crew member – 1962

== Cloughey lifeboats ==
=== Pulling and Sailing (P&S) lifeboats ===
ON (Note: ON is the RNLI's Official Number of the boat.)	Name	Built	On station	Class	Comments
94	Faith	1885	1885–1906	34-foot Self-righting (P&S)	(Note: 34-foot x 8-foot 3in (10-oared) self-righting (P&S) lifeboat, legacy of Mrs S. H. Bradshaw of Reading, Berkshire, built by Woolfe of Shadwell, London, costing £363.)
553	John	1906	1906–1931	35-foot Liverpool Non-self righting (P&S)	(Note: 35-foot x 10-foot (12-oared) Liverpool-class non-self-righting (P&S) lifeboat, legacy of Mr J. A. Hay of Cheltenham, built by Thames Ironworks of Blackwall, London, costing £973.)

=== Motor lifeboats ===
ON	Name	Built	On station	Class	Comments
746	William Maynard	1931	1931–1939	35-foot 6in Self-righting (motor)	
825	Herbert John	1939	1939–1952	35-foot 6in Liverpool	Replaced Herbert John (ON 796) which was destroyed by fire during construction at Groves & Guttridge, Cowes.
902	Constance Calverley	1952	1952–1965	35-foot 6in Liverpool	

Station Closed, 1965

=== Launch and recovery tractors ===
Op. No. (Note: Op. No. is the RNLI's Operational Number of the boat carried on the hull or vehicle.)	Reg. No.	Type	On station	Comments
T12	LLY 75	Clayton	1924–1933	
T4	XA 9192	Clayton	1933–1938	
T28	EYT 780	Case L	1938–1951	
T51	KLA 85	Case LA	1951–1959	
T42	JXR 933	Case LA	1959–1965	

== Cloughey-Portavogie lifeboat ==
ON	Name	Built	On station	Class	Comments
857	Glencoe, Glasgow	1949	1965–1978	41-foot Watson	

Station Closed, 1981

== See also ==
- List of RNLI stations
- List of former RNLI stations
- Royal National Lifeboat Institution lifeboats
