= Castletown Lifeboat Station =

Former RNLI lifeboat station on the Isle of Man

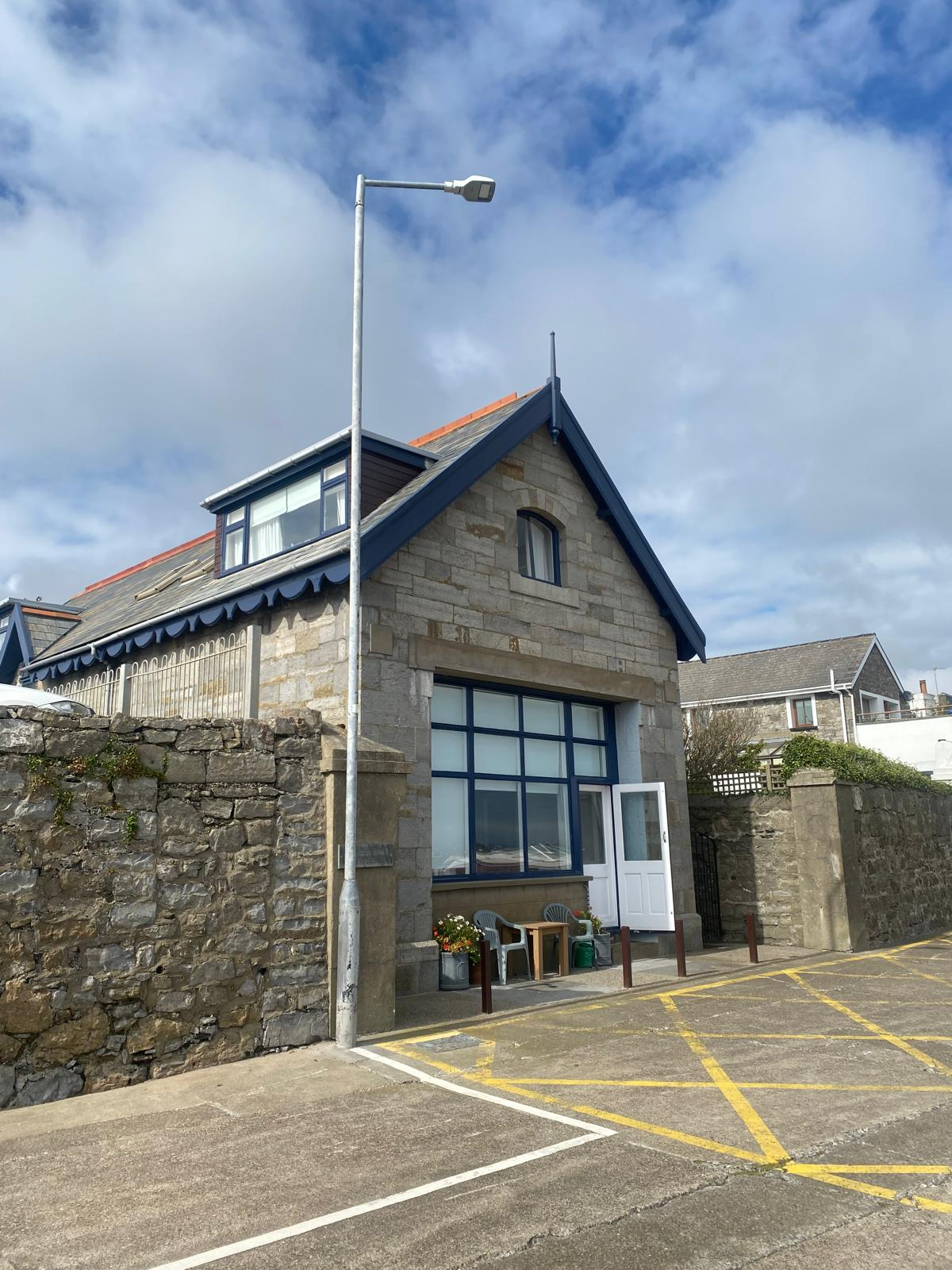
- Castletown Lifeboat Station

- Location within Isle of Man

General information
- Status: Closed
- Type: RNLI Lifeboat Station
- Location: The Outer Harbour, Castletown, Isle of Man
- Coordinates: 54°04′22.9″N 4°39′05.2″W
- Opened: 1826–c.1841 RNIPLS; 1856–1922 RNLI
- Closed: 1922

Castletown Lifeboat Station is a former RNLI lifeboat station located on the outer harbour at Castletown, a town in the south of the Isle of Man, a British Crown Dependency, and formerly the capital of the island until 1869.

A lifeboat station was established at Castletown by the Royal National Institute for the Preservation of Life from Shipwreck (RNIPLS) in 1826, but ceased to operate sometime after 1841, maybe even as late as 1851. The station was re-established by the Royal National Lifeboat Institution (RNLI) in 1856.

Castletown Lifeboat Station was closed in 1922.

== History ==
Motivated by the loss of life from shipwreck around the Isle of Man, and his involvement in the rescue of 97 men from HMS Vigilant on 6 October 1822, Douglas resident Sir William Hillary, Bt. published his "Appeal to the Nation" in 1823, and at a public meeting held at the City of London Tavern, Bishopgate on 4 March 1824, was instrumental in the establishment of the (Royal) National Institution for the Preservation of Life from Shipwreck,

Following his first request for a lifeboat for Douglas in 1824, a second lifeboat was requested, to be placed at Castletown. A 22-foot 6in lifeboat arrived on station in 1826.

On 7 December 1828, the steam packet Earl of Roden of Liverpool was driven on the rocks at Derbyhaven, with 60 passengers on board. The Castletown lifeboat launched at 01:00, with three extra volunteers supplementing the crew. After standing by until 06:00, all were safely landed ashore. The three volunteers, George Quirk, Thomas Brine and William Henry Carrington, were each awarded the RNLI Silver Medal.

By the 1840s, with falling financial support, the RNIPLS was in decline, not helped with the death of Hillary in 1847. It is thought that the Castletown lifeboat ceased to operate sometime between 1842 and 1851.

The fortunes of the RNIPLS were turned around in the early 1850s, and in 1854, the Institution became the RNLI. At a meeting of the committee of management on Thursday 6 Dec 1855, Capt. John R. Ward, Inspector of Lifeboats, reported that the Lieutenant Governor of the Isle of Man, Charles Hope, and other notable residents, had promised their cooperation for the re-establishment of a branch of the RNLI on the Island. It was decided to commission the construction of a boathouse at Castletown, ready for the arrival of a new lifeboat and carriage.

A 27-foot self-righting 'Pulling and Sailing' (P&S) lifeboat, one with both sails and (8) oars, weighing two tons, along with a transporting carriage, was provided to Castletown in 1856. The boat, which cost £136-2s when new, had initially been placed at Newcastle, but had been found to be too heavy for the location. Lieutenant Governor Charles Hope was appointed president of the Isle of Man Branch of the RNLI.

The first launch was on 15 November 1858, to the lugger Queen of the Isles. Her crew of three were rescued.

In 1865, the Castletown lifeboat was found to be suffering from dry rot. A larger 32-foot self-righting lifeboat and a new carriage were provided. The new boat was funded from the Commercial Travellers Lifeboat Fund, through the efforts of W. Bishop of Boston, Lincs, and Robert Affleck of Stretford, the latter better known as the founder of Affleck and Brown in Manchester. The fund had previously provided a lifeboat for Barrow, Commercial Traveller No.1. With the principal support for the fund coming from the midland counties, the lifeboat was first taken to Sheffield, transported free of charge by the Midland Railway Company, where after being paraded through the streets, the lifeboat was placed on public exhibition in the Botanical Gardens. Miss Jessop, daughter of Thomas Jessop, mayor of Sheffield, was called to name the lifeboat Commercial Traveller No.2. The proceedings would invigorate fundraising for the Sheffield Lifeboat Fund, which went on to provide a lifeboat for Runswick the following year. The lifeboat was then transported to Liverpool, from where it was shipped free of charge by the Isle of Man Steam Packet Company.

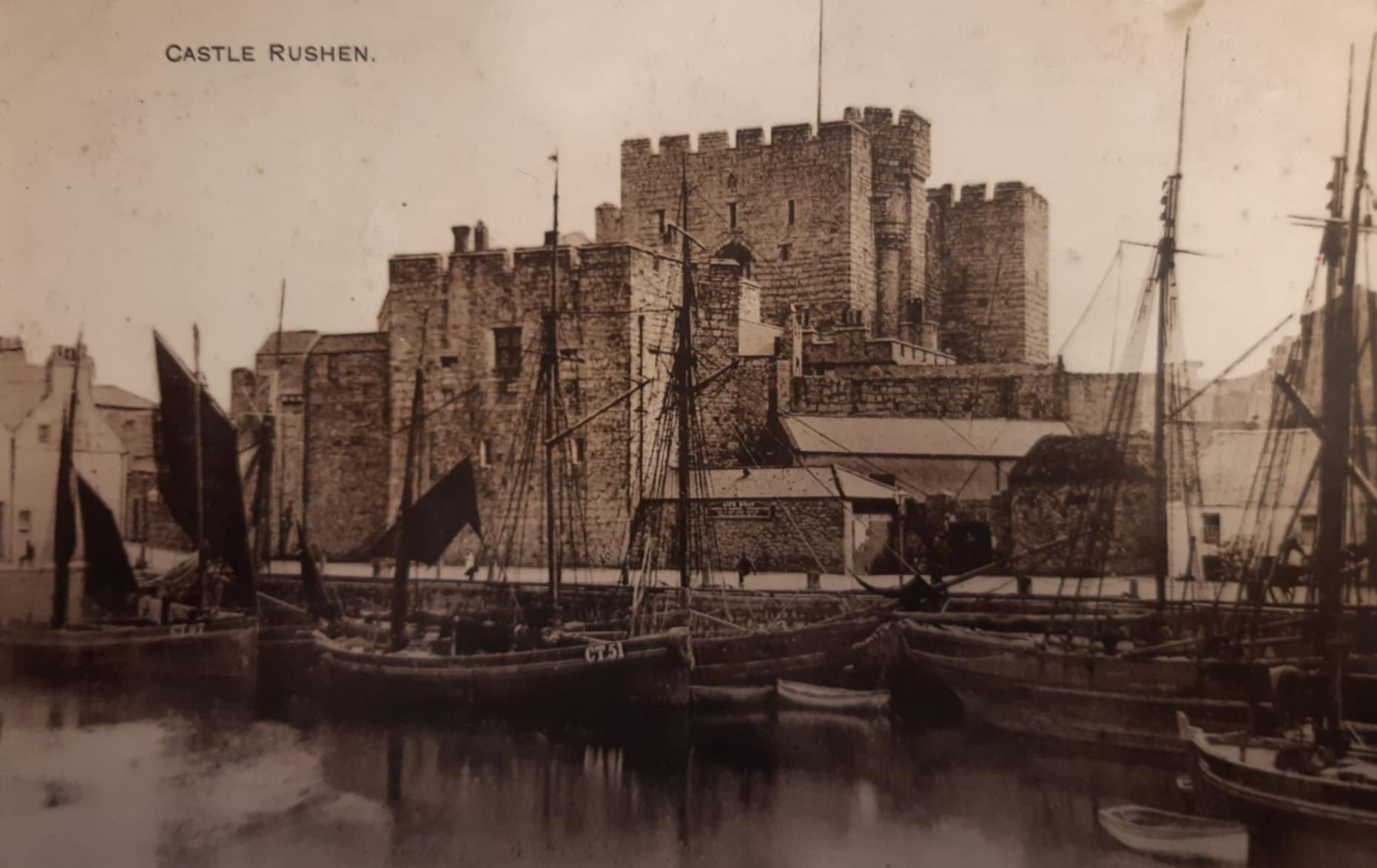
Castletown Lifeboat House, in the shadow of Castle Rushen, c.1900

Commercial Traveller No.2 was launched at 01:00 on the 28 May 1877 to the barque Junak of Split, Croatia, (then known as Spalato), which was on passage from Alexandria to Glasgow, when it was driven ashore in Castletown Bay. With the regular coxswain absent with illness, the Honorary Secretary Mr Quayle joined the crew. All 14 crew of the Junak were rescued.

In 1881, the Institution was the recipient of the bequest of £1500-0s-0d from the late Mrs. S. H. Bradshaw of Reading, Berkshire. The funds were for the provision of three 34-foot self-righting (P&S) lifeboats, all sent to their respective stations in 1885:

- Faith (ON 94), Cloughey (1885–1906)
- Hope (ON 82), Castletown (1885–1896)
- Charity (ON 96), Drogheda No.2, (1885–1901)

Coxswain William Callow was awarded the RNLI Silver Medal on 3 June 1886, "In recognition of his long and valuable services". Services included:

- lugger Nimrod (1861)
- schooner Eliza Ann (1861)
- schooner Water Lily (1864)
- schooner Maria (1868)
- schooner Vision (1868)
- barque Junak (1877)
- brigantine Euginie Auguste (1882)
- schooner John Perry (1885)

Callow was awarded a Second-Service clasp in 1891 for further rescues:

- Fishing trawler Swift (1886)
- schooner Julia (1886)
- schooner Madryn (1889)

On the morning of 7 February 1895, a telegram reported a vessel ashore at Port St Mary. It took some while clearing a 6-foot snowdrift, before access could be gained to the lifeboat house. Castletown lifeboat Hope (ON 82) was launched at 09:15, and found the steamship Vigilant of Liverpool, which had been on passage from Burry Port to Belfast with a cargo of coal, aground on a reef. Six men had made shore in a local boat, but the remaining six, clinging to the rigging, were rescued by the lifeboat, and landed at Port St Mary.

The last lifeboat to be stationed at Castletown, was the 35-foot self-righting (P&S) lifeboat Thomas Black (ON 388), funded from the bequest of £1000 from the late Mrs Isabella Black of Eastbourne. A new boathouse with slipway was constructed at the head of the outer harbour, at a cost of £1100-4s-6d, replacing the former boathouse which had been located at the inner harbour, in the shadow of Castle Rushen.

On Feb 6 1912, the brigantine Albion of Portsmouth, on passage from Poole to Ellesmere Port, struck the rocks on the east side of the Langness Peninsula. The Thomas Black was launched at 18:38, and with great difficulty in the strong South-East wind, seven men were rescued and landed at Derbyhaven.

With just one rescue after 1912, and an increasing number of motor-powered vessels, which were less likely to be driven ashore in poor weather, Castletown Lifeboat Station was closed in 1922. The boathouse was sold the following year, and the lifeboat on station at the time of closure was sold to a private owner in Port St Mary.

== Station honours ==
The following are awards made at Castletown.

- RNIPLS Silver Medal

George Quirk, Water Baliff – 1828
Thomas Brine, Lloyd's agent – 1828
William Henry Carrington, Comptroller of Customs – 1828

- RNLI Silver Medal

William Callow, Coxswain – 1886

William Callow, Coxswain – 1891 (Second-Service clasp)

== Castletown lifeboats ==
ON (Note: ON is the RNLI's Official Number of the boat.)	Name	Built	On station	Class	Comments
Pre-119	Unknown	1826	1826–c.1851	22-foot 6in Plenty Non-self-righting	(Note: 22-foot 6in x 6-foot 5in (6-oared) Plenty-class non-self-righting lifeboat, provided by the RNIPLS, built by William Plenty of Newbury, Berkshire, costing £130.)
Station Closed ~1842–1856
Pre-279	Unnamed	1854	1856–1865	27-foot Peake Self-righting (P&S)	(Note: 27-foot x 7-foot 6in (8-oared) Peake-class self-righting (P&S) lifeboat, built by Forrestt of Limehouse, London, costing £135 when new.); Previously at Newcastle
Pre-442	Commercial Traveller No.2	1865	1865–1885	32-foot Prowse Self-righting (P&S)	(Note: 32-foot x 7-foot 6in (10-oared) Prowse-class self-righting (P&S) lifeboat, funded by the Commercial Travellers LB fund, built by Forrestt of Limehouse, London, costing £253.)
82	Hope	1885	1885–1896	34-foot Self-righting (P&S)	(Note: 34-foot x 7-foot 6in (10-oared) self-righting (P&S) lifeboat, legacy of Mrs S. H. Bradshaw of Reading, Berkshire, built by Woolfe of Shadwell, London, costing £300.)
388	Thomas Black	1896	1896–1922	35-foot Self-righting (P&S)	(Note: 35-foot x 8-foot 3in (10-oared) self-righting (P&S) lifeboat, legacy of Mrs J. Black of Eastbourne, built by Forrest of Limehouse, London, costing £371.)

== See also ==
- List of RNLI stations
- List of former RNLI stations
- Royal National Lifeboat Institution lifeboats
