= Peake-class lifeboat =

19th-century RNLI lifeboat class

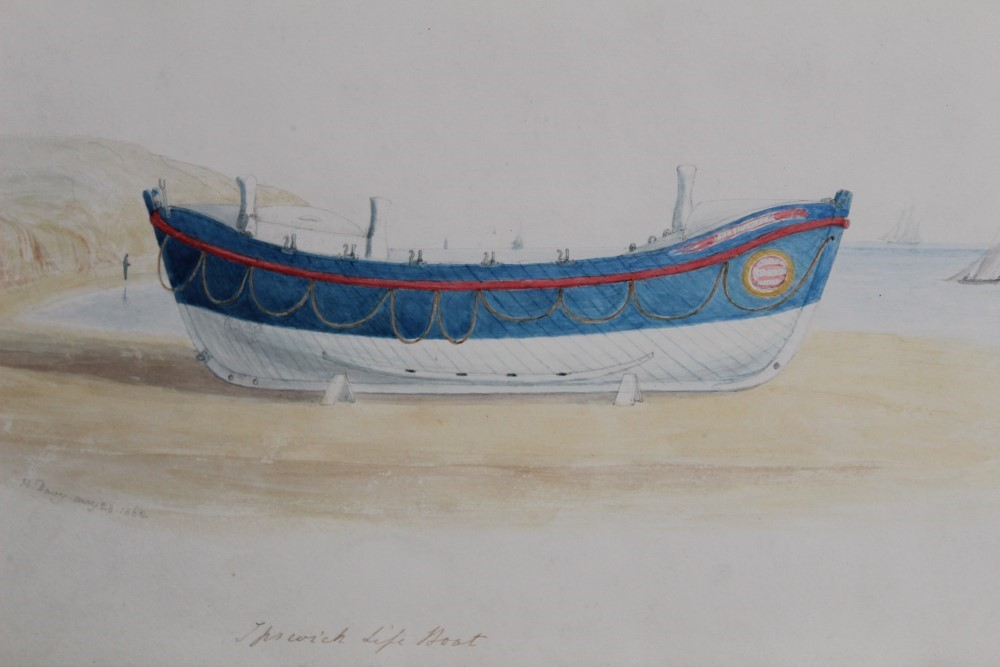
- Ipswich, a 10-oar boat of 1862

Class overview
- Name: Peake-class
- Operators: RNLI

General characteristics
- Type: Lifeboat
- Length: 25 ft (7.6 m)–37 ft (11.3 m)
- Beam: Typically 7 ft 6 in (2.3 m)
- Propulsion: Oars, sails

The Peake-class lifeboats were the most numerous lifeboats operated by the Royal National Lifeboat Institution (RNLI) around the coasts of the United Kingdom including Ireland between the 1850s and the 1890s.

== Background ==
Lifeboats of various designs had been stationed at many towns in the United Kingdom by the middle of the 18th century. Some were self-righting and all were rowed or "pulled"; many were designed by local committees to their own preferred design. In 1850 a competition was held by the Duke of Northumberland to design a lifeboat that could also use sails so that its range could be extended, a "pulling and sailing" lifeboat. 280 entries were received and that by James Beeching considered the best. Several Beeching-class lifeboats were built but James Peake, a master shipwright at the Royal Woolwich Dockyard, was asked by the RNLI to develop the design further.

== Design ==
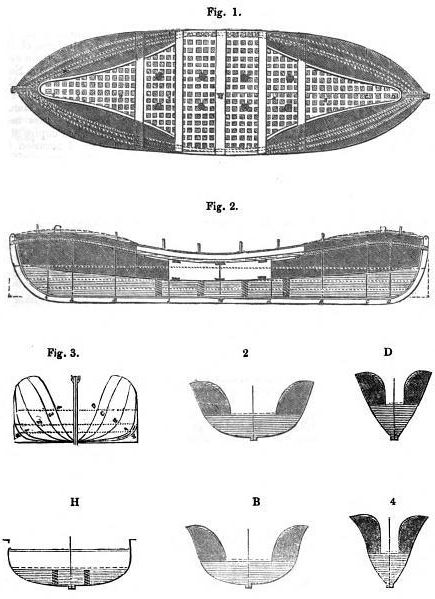
Peake's development of Beeching's lifeboat, 1851

Peake produced a self-righting lifeboat similar to Beeching's design, some 30 ft (9.1 m) long and 7 ft 6 in (2.3 m) wide. It drew just 14 in (36 cm) of water and weighed only 4,256 lb (1,930 kg), lighter than Beeching's 3.5 t (3,500 kg) and therefore easier transport on its specially designed carriage to a launch site and get into the water.

A 784 lb (356 kg) iron keel enabled it to self-right if it capsized. The ballast beneath the floor was cork whereas Beeching had used water tanks. The boat was fitted with large air-tight cases in the bow, stern, and along the sides which were covered in cork to give better grip to people moving around in the boat. There were also one-way valves at the bottom of the boat to drain out water. Tests showed that the boat could self-right in about 3 seconds and a boat full of water could drain in about 30 seconds.

== Deployment 1852–1863 ==
Peake-designed lifeboats were the preferred choice for both new and replacement boats at most stations, although some other designs were provided to suit local needs. The first to be built was 30 ft (9.1 m) long and designed for 12 oars. Most stations were provided with boats designed generally for 6 or 10 people at the oars.

Built	Name	Length	Oars	First station	Comments
1852	Percy	30 ft (9.1 m)	12	Cullercoats	Prototype Peake-class lifeboat built at Woolwich Dockyard.
1852	Petrel	31 ft (9.4 m)	12	Appledore	
1852	Latimer	30 ft (9.1 m)	10	Newbiggin	
1852	—	27 ft (8.2 m)	10	Worthing	
1853	—	32 ft (9.8 m)	12	Aldeburgh	
1853	—	27 ft (8.2 m)	8	Barmouth	
1853	—	27 ft (8.2 m)	8	Bude Haven	
1853	—	27 ft (8.2 m)	8	Lyme Regis	
1853	—	30 ft (9.1 m)	10	Penzance	Later stationed at Lyme Regis.
1853	—	25 ft (7.6 m)	6	Sennen Cove	
1854	—	27 ft (8.2 m)	8	Ardrossan	
1854	—	27 ft (8.2 m)	8	Dungeness	
1854	—	28 ft (8.5 m)	10	Portmadoc	
1854	—	29 ft (8.8 m)	10	Skerries	
1855	—	30 ft (9.1 m)	10	Berwick-upon-Tweed	
1855	—	30 ft (9.1 m)	10	Boulmer	
1855	—	30 ft (9.1 m)	10	Fishguard	
1855	—	30 ft (9.1 m)	10	Hauxley	
1855	—	30 ft (9.1 m)	10	Lytham	
1855	—	26 ft (7.9 m)	6	Newcastle	Later stationed at Thorpeness.
1856	Mermaid	28 ft (8.5 m)	6	Appledore	
1856	—	27 ft (8.2 m)	8	Castletown	
1856	—	30 ft (9.1 m)	10	Drogheda No.1	
1856	—	28 ft (8.5 m)	6	Dungeness	
1856	B Wood	28 ft (8.5 m)	6	Hornsea	
1856	—	30 ft (9.1 m)	6	Padstow	
1856	—	27 ft (8.2 m)	8	Rye	
1857	—	28 ft (8.5 m)	6	Ballycotton	
1857	Dolphin	28 ft (8.5 m)	6	Appledore	Appledore No. 3 boat at Braunton Burrows.
1857	—	30 ft (9.1 m)	10	Arklow	
1857	—	30 ft (9.1 m)	10	Cahore	
1857	—	28 ft (8.5 m)	6	Kilmore	
1857	—	27 ft (8.2 m)	5	Penmon	
1857	—	28 ft (8.5 m)	6	Rye	
1857	—	30 ft (9.1 m)	10	Seaton Carew	
1857	—	30 ft (9.1 m)	10	Walmer	
1857	—	30 ft (9.1 m)	10	Youghal	
1858	—	30 ft (9.1 m)	6	Aberdovey	
1858	—	28 ft (8.5 m)	6	Ardmore	
1858	—	32 ft (9.8 m)	10	Bacton	
1858	—	30 ft (9.1 m)	10	Brighton	
1858	—	34 ft (10 m)	12	Cromer	
1858	—	28 ft (8.5 m)	6	Dover	
1858	Havelock	30 ft (9.1 m)	10	Fraserburgh	
1858	—	28 ft (8.5 m)	6	Groomsport	
1858	—	30 ft (9.1 m)	10	Hastings	
1858	—	30 ft (9.1 m)	10	Holyhead	
1858	—	30 ft (9.1 m)	10	Mundesley	
1858	—	30 ft (9.1 m)	10	Palling	
1858	—	28 ft (8.5 m)	6	Rosslare Fort	
1858	—	30 ft (9.1 m)	6	Skerries	
1858	—	30 ft (9.1 m)	10	Winterton	
1859	—	32 ft (9.8 m)	10	Ayr	
1859	—	30 ft (9.1 m)	6	Carmarthen Bay	
1859	Gertrude	30 ft (9.1 m)	6	Carnsore	
1859	—	32 ft (9.8 m)	10	Cullercoats	
1859	—	30 ft (9.1 m)	6	Dundalk	
1859	Christopher Ludlow	30 ft (9.1 m)	6	Dungarvan	Unnamed until 1869.
1859	—	30 ft (9.1 m)	6	Exmouth	
1859	—	30 ft (9.1 m)	6	Fleetwood	
1859	—	30 ft (9.1 m)	6	Fowey	
1859	—	30 ft (9.1 m)	6	Lizard	
1859	—	30 ft (9.1 m)	6	Lossiemouth	
1859	Reigate	30 ft (9.1 m)	6	Newcastle	
1859	Thomas Boys of Brighton	30 ft (9.1 m)	6	Rhoscolyn	
1859	—	30 ft (9.1 m)	6	Tramore	
1859	—	32 ft (9.8 m)	10	Whitburn	
1860	—	30 ft (9.1 m)	6	Banff	
1860	—	30 ft (9.1 m)	6	Brighstone Grange	
1860	—	30 ft (9.1 m)	6	Brooke	
1860	—	30 ft (9.1 m)	6	Buckie	
1860	Lord Murray	30 ft (9.1 m)	6	Campbeltown	Reported as 10 oars from 1869.
1860	—	30 ft (9.1 m)	6	Dungeness	
1860	Pringle Kid	30 ft (9.1 m)	6	Irvine	
1860	—	30 ft (9.1 m)	6	Newquay	
1860	—	30 ft (9.1 m)	6	North Berwick	
1860	—	32 ft (9.8 m)	10	Orme's Head	
1860	—	30 ft (9.1 m)	6	Penarth	
1860	Alexandra	30 ft (9.1 m)	6	Penzance	
1860	Brave Robert Shedden	30 ft (9.1 m)	6	Porthcawl	
1860	Laura Countess of Antrim	30 ft (9.1 m)	6	Portrush	
1860	Polly and Lucy	32 ft (9.8 m)	10	St Andrews	
1860	Moses	30 ft (9.1 m)	6	St Ives	Renamed Covent Garden in 1870 then Exeter in 1878.
1860	—	35 ft (11 m)	12	Selsey	
1860	—	30 ft (9.1 m)	6	Silloth	
1860	Jessie Knowles	32 ft (9.8 m)	10	Southport	
1860	—	30 ft (9.1 m)	6	Thurso	
1860	—	30 ft (9.1 m)	6	Tyrella	
1861	Evelyn Wood	32 ft (9.8 m)	10	Aberystwyth	
1861	Helen Lees	30 ft (9.1 m)	6	Kirkcudbright	
1861	—	32 ft (9.8 m)	10	Scarborough	On station 26 September but wrecked 2 November 1861.
1861	—	37 ft (11 m)	12	Walmer	
1861	—	32 ft (9.8 m)	10	Whitby	
1861	—	30 ft (9.1 m)	10	Winchelsea	
1862	Hope	34 ft (10 m)	12	Appledore	
1862	—	32 ft (9.8 m)	10	Broughty Ferry	
1862	Old George Irlam of Liverpool	28 ft (8.5 m)	6	Drogheda No.1	
1862	Edward Wasey	32 ft (9.8 m)	10	Fleetwood	
1862	—	30 ft (9.1 m)	6	Howth	
1862	—	34 ft (10 m)	6	Kingstown	
1862	Prince Consort	34 ft (10 m)	7	Plymouth	
1862	—	30 ft (9.1 m)	6	Poolbeg	
1862	Louisa Hall	30 ft (9.1 m)	6	St Sampson	
1862	Mary	33 ft (10 m)	10	Scarborough	
1862	Ipswich	33 ft (10 m)	10	Thorpeness	
1862	Constance	33 ft (10 m)	10	Tynemouth	
1862	Pelican	34 ft (10 m)	12	Withernsea	
1863	—	28 ft (8.5 m)	6	Kingsgate	
1863	Agar Robartes	30 ft (9.1 m)	6	Porthleven	

== Self-righter lifeboats from 1863 ==
At the time of the annual report in 1863, the RNLI had 124 stations of which 99 were operating lifeboats to Peake's design and 6 to Beeching's. The remainder were non-self-righting including 7 Norfolk and Suffolk-class and 2 Richardson tubular lifeboats. After this time the reports no longer listed the class of lifeboat although mention was sometimes made when a non-standard design was provided. The design that had evolved was generally referred to as a 'self-righting' or 'self-righter' lifeboat. The design continued to evolve and new features were tried. Some used water ballast like Beeching's but with lighter construction as used by Peake.

George Lennox Watson was appointed the RNLI's naval architectural adviser in 1887. He produced a prototype Watson-class non-self righting boat in 1888, but self-righting boats with many of the features designed by Peake continued to be built until 1916. Most were either 35 ft (11 m) or 37 ft (11 m) long.
