= Cahore Lifeboat Station =

Former RNLI lifeboat station in County Wexford, Ireland

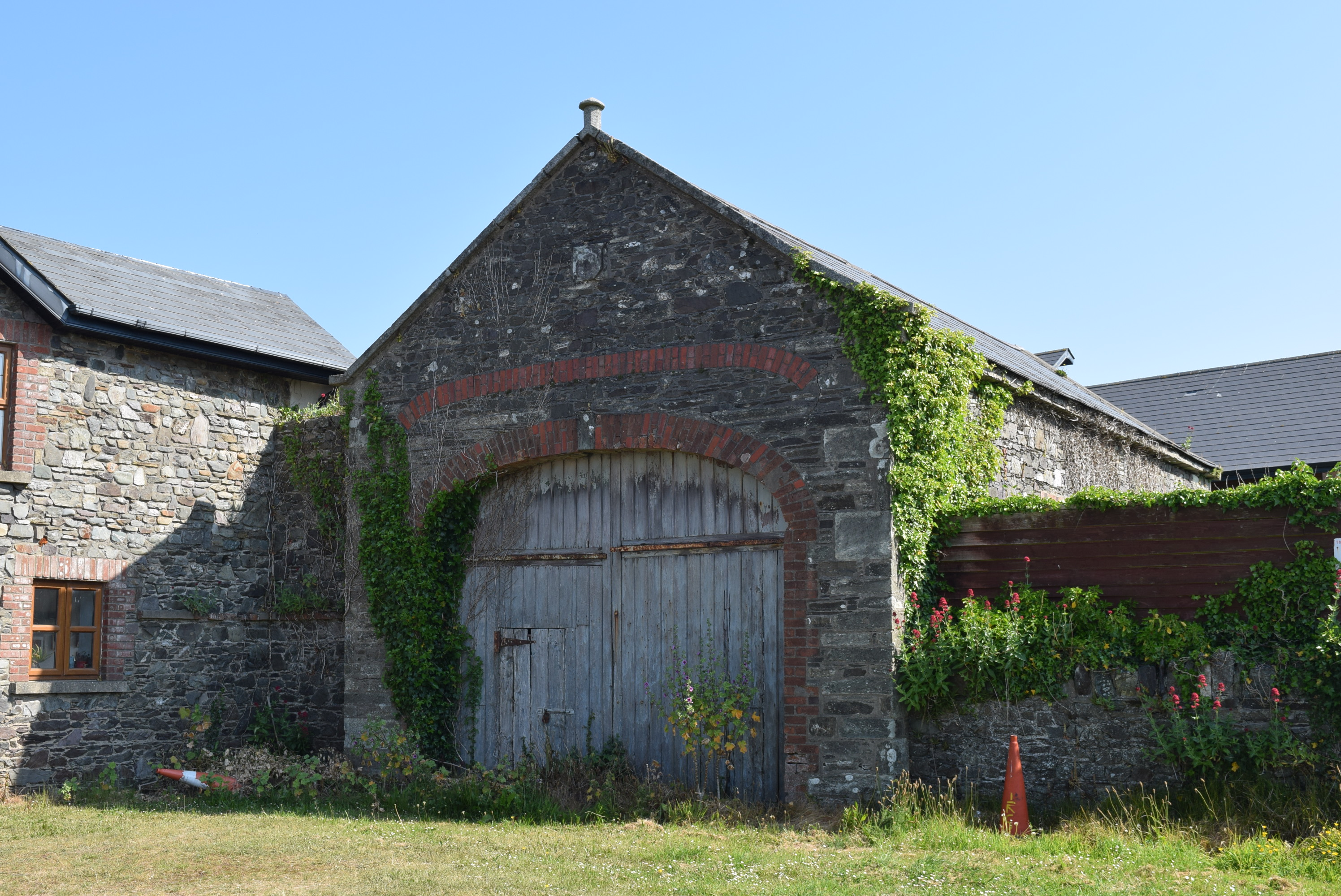
- Cahore Lifeboat House

- Cahore, County Wexford

General information
- Status: Closed
- Type: RNLI Lifeboat Station
- Location: Cahore Road, Cahore, County Wexford, Ireland
- Coordinates: 52°34′05.9″N 6°12′11.6″W
- Opened: 1857
- Closed: 1916

Cahore Lifeboat Station was located on Cahore Road in Cahore, a small fishing village located mid-way between Arklow and Wexford, approximately 100 km (62 mi) south of Dublin, in County Wexford, on the east coast of Ireland.

A lifeboat station was first established at Cahore in 1857 by the Royal National Lifeboat Institution (RNLI).

After 59 years in operation, Cahore Lifeboat Station was closed in 1916.

== History ==
On the 18 December 1848, the full-rigged ship Republic was wrecked on Blackwater Bank, whilst on passage from Liverpool to Baltimore, Maryland. Two boats put out, Zephyr and Steamer, and the Master, and 19 of the 21 crew, were saved. Ever since its founding in 1824, the Royal National Institution for the Preservation of Life from Shipwreck (RNIPLS), later to become the RNLI in 1854, would award medals for deeds of gallantry at sea, even if no lifeboats were involved. The captains of both boats were awarded the RNIPLS Silver Medal.

In the RNLI journal 'The Lifeboat' of 1 October 1857, it was reported that a new lifeboat station had been established at Cahore in County Wexford, Ireland. "The Blackwater Bank, extending for many miles along this part of the coast, has been from time immemorial a source of great danger to shipping, and seldom a year passes that several wrecks do not take place on it."

Representation and campaign by John George, former MP for County Wexford, was instrumental in the provision of a lifeboat for this location. A 30-foot self-righting 'Pulling and Sailing' (P&S) lifeboat, one with sails and (10) oars, and based upon the design of Mr Peake, along with a transporting carriage, was provided to the station. The lifeboat was transported from London to Dublin free of charge by the British and Irish Steam Packet Company.

On 7 August 1861, the Spanish barque Primera de Torrevieja, on passage from Liverpool to Havana, ran aground on Blackwater Bank, 19 kilometres (12 mi) from Cahore. The lifeboat launched, but returned after an hour rowing against the wind and tide. The vessel was later seen drifting, and this time, the lifeboat managed to get a crew aboard. The vessel was badly holed, and with the lifeboat crew unable to maintain a pump, she was run ashore at Arklow. This action saved the vessel, the cargo, and one man, who had been forgotten when the Master and 15 crew abandoned the vessel in the ships boat, and would have likely drowned.

The American vessel A.Z., on passage from Liverpool to New York, stranded on Blackwater Bank on 20 October 1861. The Cahore lifeboat set out, but before she arrived, the vessel released from the bank, and was seen heading south. However, a small boat remained, containing one man, in a distressed state, who was taken aboard the lifeboat. He had been a party of 5 who had set out to aid the vessel. Four men had gone aboard, but he had been left behind when the vessel freed, and the captain refused to pick him up. A 'landsman', with no experience of boats, the Captain had effectively left him to die. The other four men were also badly treated, put off on a pilot boat at Cork, with no payment for their service and help, and finding themselves with no funds to return the 200 km (120 mi) to home.

The Cahore lifeboat would bring ashore the six crew of the schooner Speed of Wexford, anchored close to the rocks in a strong gale on 9 May 1865. The Master, in fear of the vessel being wrecked, hoisted distress signals, but the vessel survived the storm, and the crew were returned to the boat, to continue her voyage.

Despite these rescues, it was reported that the Cahore lifeboat was too heavy. A replacement 32-foot lifeboat and carriage were sent to the station in 1866, transported free of charge by the British and Irish Steam Packet Company, and by the Dublin, Wicklow, and Wexford Railway Company. The cost of the lifeboat was gifted to the Institution by General Sir George Bowles K.C.B. It would be the second lifeboat funded by him, the first being provided for Howth in 1862, and would be given the identical name, Sir George Bowles.

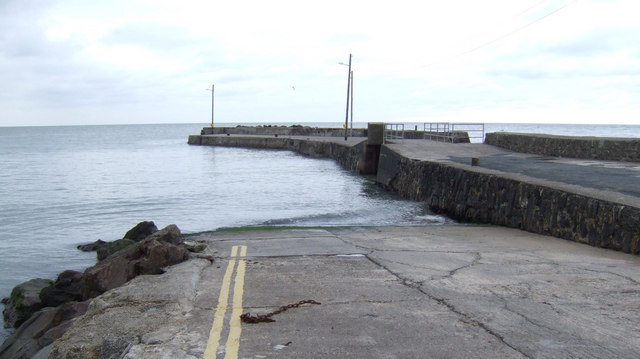
Cahore Pier and slipway

The Sir George Bowles would perform several rescues and save many lives. When the barque Nanta of Lussino went ashore at Rusk Bank on 18 January 1877, whilst on passage from Glasgow to Trieste, the lifeboat took three hours to make the 4.8 km (3.0 mi) to the vessel. Even on arrival, it was some time before the lifeboat could get close enough to pass a line, but all 13 aboard the vessel were rescued, after being pulled through the water to the waiting lifeboat.

Sir George Bowles was replaced in 1878. A 34-foot self-righting lifeboat John Brooke (ON 293) was sent to the station, funded by the gift of the Misses Brooke, in memory of their late brother, John Brooke, QC.

The John Brooke was launched at 11:00 on 5 February 1883, when signals of distress were seen on the Blackwater Lightship. The lifeboat arrived to find not the lightship in trouble, but six crew of the brigantine Zephyr, who had managed to get to the safety of the lightship, when their vessel ran aground.

Launching at 20:30 on 17 May 1891, the John Brooke rescued five men from the Jewess, on passage from Wexford to Dublin with a cargo of malt, when she ran aground on Bam Shoal near Morriscastle.

Coxswain William Potter was awarded the RNLI Silver Medal in 1892, in recognition of his 25 years of service to the Cahore lifeboat. He had launched 31 times, and helped save 47 lives.

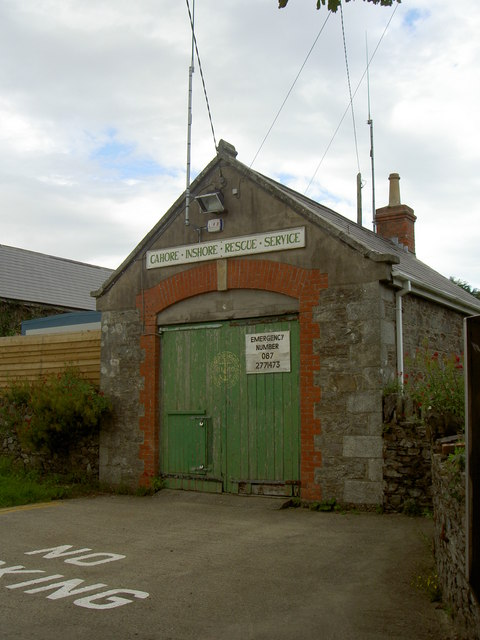
Cahore Inshore Rescue Service

In 1892, the fourth, and final, lifeboat was placed at Cahore. Funded by Mr Joseph Leather of Liverpool, the 35-foot lifeboat was named Willie and Arthur (ON 333).

The lifeboat Willie and Arthur was launched at 20:30 on 20 August 1908, and four crew were rescued from the schooner Helen MacGregor, on passage from Scotland to Arklow.

At the meeting of the RNLI committee of management on Friday 13 October 1916, following the visit and report of the District Inspector, the decision was made to close Cahore Lifeboat Station.

The station building still survives, and is one of two similar buildings in Cahore, the other one currently in use by the Cahore Inshore Rescue Service. The lifeboat on station at the time of closure, Willie and Arthur (ON 333), was sold in 1917. No further details are recorded.

== Station honours ==
The following are awards made at Cahore.

- RNIPLS Silver Medal

Philip Mitten, Capt of Zephyr – 1849
Thomas Rossiter, Capt. of Steamer – 1849

- RNLI Silver Medal

William Potter, Coxswain – 1892

== Cahore lifeboats ==
| ON (Note: ON is the RNLI's Official Number of the boat.) | Name | Built | On station | Class | Comments |
|---|---|---|---|---|---|
| Pre-312 | Unnamed | 1857 | 1857–1866 | 30-foot Peake Self-righting (P&S) | (Note: 30-foot x 7-foot 6in (10-oared) Peake-class self-righting (P&S) lifeboat, built by Forrestt of Limehouse, London, costing £158.) |
| Pre-458 | Sir George Bowles | 1866 | 1866–1878 | 32-foot Prowse Self-righting (P&S) | (Note: 32-foot x 7-foot 9in (10-oared) Prowse-class self-righting (P&S) lifeboat, gift of Gen. Sir G. Bowles of Curzon Street, London, built by Woolfe of Shadwell, London, costing £240.) |
| 293 | John Brooke | 1878 | 1878–1892 | 34-foot Self-righting (P&S) | (Note: 34-foot x 8-foot (10-oared) self-righting (P&S) lifeboat, gift of the Misses Brooke of Clones, built by Woolfe of Shadwell, London, costing £363.) |
| 333 | Willie and Arthur | 1892 | 1892–1916 | 35-foot Self-righting (P&S) | (Note: 35-foot x 8-foot (10-oared) self-righting (P&S) lifeboat, gift of Mr J. Leather of Liverpool, built by Woolfe of Shadwell, London, costing £463.) |

Station Closed, 1916

Pre ON numbers are unofficial numbers used by the Lifeboat Enthusiast Society to reference early lifeboats not included on the official RNLI list.

== See also ==
- List of RNLI stations
- List of former RNLI stations
- Royal National Lifeboat Institution lifeboats
