= Bacton Lifeboat Station =

Former RNLI lifeboat station in Norfolk, England

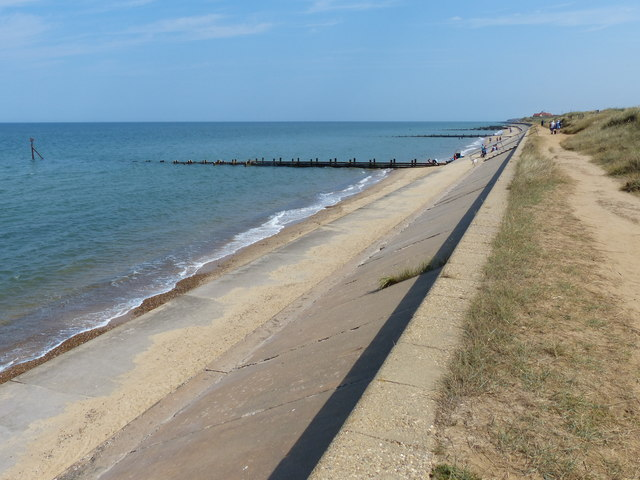
- Bacton Sea Defences.

- Bacton, Norfolk

General information
- Status: Closed
- Type: RNLI Lifeboat Station
- Location: Watch House Lane, Bacton, Norfolk, England
- Coordinates: 52°50′57.0″N 1°29′21.5″E
- Opened: 1822 Local Committee; 1823 NSA; 1858 RNLI
- Closed: 1882

Bacton Lifeboat Station was located at the end of Watch House Lane in Bacton, a village approximately 11 miles (18 km) south-east of Cromer, on the north-east coast of Norfolk.

A lifeboat was first stationed at Bacton by local committee in 1822, taken over by the 'Norfolk Association for Saving the Lives of Shipwrecked Mariners', more commonly known as the Norfolk Shipwreck Association or (NSA), in 1823. Management of the station was transferred to the Royal National Lifeboat Institution (RNLI) in 1858.

After operating for 60 years, Bacton Lifeboat Station closed in 1882.

== History ==
A 29-foot 10-oared non-self-righting lifeboat was first provided to Bacton by a local committee in 1822, but the station and lifeboat were quickly adopted by the newly formed NSA, in 1823.

Following a meeting of the NSA on 21 Nov 1857, it was agreed to request that the RNLI take over responsibility for all their lifeboat stations, including Bacton. This was formally agreed at a meeting of the RNLI committee of management on 3 December 1857.

A new 32-foot self-righting 'Pulling and Sailing' (P&S) lifeboat, one with sails and (10) oars, was ordered from Forrestt of Limehouse, London, costing £167. On 26 October 1858, the new boat was sailed up to Bacton from Great Yarmouth by the Gorlston boatmen, having been towed there from London free of charge by the General Steam Navigation Company. A new boathouse was commissioned, along with a new carriage for the lifeboat.

On 3 December 1864, the Bacton lifeboat was launched to the aid of the barque Ina, on passage from South Shields to Cartagena, when she was driven ashore in a north-west gale, 1 mile (1.6 km) south of Happisburgh Lighthouse. In full sail, the first time this had been used during a rescue, Bacton lifeboat headed down the coast, anchoring 100 yards (91 m) from the vessel. From there, the lifeboat was veered down, and managed to rescue the Master, Pilot and 12 men. The mate, under the influence of alcohol, could not be coaxed from the vessel, and was lost when the ship broke up. William Cubitt, Bacton RNLI Honorary Secretary, who had gone along to "animate and encourage the crew", was awarded the RNLI Silver Medal.

In 1865, a new 33-foot lifeboat was dispatched to Bacton, as the old boat had been damaged on service. Once again, the lifeboat was towed to Great Yarmouth free of charge by the General Steam Navigation Company. The £300 cost of the new lifeboat and equipment was gifted to the Institution by an anonymous donor, "M. P. G.". At their request, the new lifeboat was named Recompense.

Honorary Secretary William Cubitt would gain a second RNLI Silver Medal, when on 14 August 1867, he rode out into the surf on horseback, and saved the life of a man who had been washed out to sea whilst bathing.

Bacton Lifeboat Station closed in 1882. The site of the lifeboat house at the end of Watch House Lane was later lost to coastal erosion. The lifeboat on station at the time of closure, Recompense, was sold the same year. No further details are known.

== Notable service ==
At 06:00 on Tuesday 20 January 1880, the schooner Richard Warbrick of Fleetwood was driven ashore, whilst on passage from Runcorn to Newcastle-upon-Tyne with a cargo of salt. The Bacton Rocket Brigade managed to get a line across to the vessel, but the crew were incapable of working the apparatus. It was too shallow to launch the Bacton lifeboat Recompense, so she was taken north on her carriage to deeper water, and launched at 08:00.

Once alongside, and in the process of getting lines aboard, the lifeboat was capsized, with all but four crew thrown into the water. Bowman William Patridge Cubitt Jr., along with the three other crew still aboard, helped assist four more crew back into the lifeboat. Cubitt then jumped overboard, to cut a line jammed in the rudder, allowing the lifeboat to return to shore. It was later stated that the whole crew may have been lost without his actions. The old 1822 lifeboat boat was launched by the Beachmen, rescuing two more lifeboat crew, and later the crew of the schooner. One further lifeboat man was washed ashore, clinging to an oar, but two crew members were lost. Bowman William Patridge Cubitt Jr., son of Honorary Secretary William Cubitt, was awarded the RNLI Gold Medal.

== Station honours ==
The following are awards made at Bacton.

- RNLI Gold Medal

William Patridge Cubitt Jr., crew member – 1880

- RNLI Silver Medal

William Cubitt, Honorary Secretary – 1864

William Cubitt, Honorary Secretary – 1867 (Second-Service clasp)

- The Thanks of the Institution inscribed on Vellum

William Wenn – 1880

== Roll of honour ==
In memory of those lost whilst serving Bacton lifeboat.

- Lost when the lifeboat Recompense capsized, whilst trying to get alongside the schooner Richard Warbrick, 20 January 1880

James Stageman, Second Coxswain (56)
James Haylett, crew member (61)

== Bacton lifeboats ==
=== Pulling and Sailing (P&S) lifeboats ===
| ON (Note: ON is the RNLI's Official Number of the boat.) | Name | Built | On station | Class | Comments |
|---|---|---|---|---|---|
| Pre-083 | Unnamed | 1822 | 1822−1845 | 29-foot 6in North Country | (Note: 29-foot 6in x 11-foot 6in (12-oared) North Country non-self-righting lifeboat.); NSA lifeboat, loaned to Caister between 1845 and 1846. |
| Pre-083 | Unnamed | 1822 | 1846−1858 | 29-foot 6in North Country | Retained on site after 1858, and used in the 1880 rescue. |
| Pre-336 | Unnamed | 1858 | 1858−1865 | 32-foot Peake Self-righting (P&S) | (Note: 32-foot x 7-foot 10in (10-oared) Peake-class self-righting (P&S) lifeboat, from RNLI funds, built by Forrestt of Limehouse, London, costing £199.); Damaged in 1865, later broken up. |
| Pre-429 | Recompense | 1865 | 1865−1882 | 33-foot Peake Self-righting (P&S) | (Note: 33-foot x 8-foot 1in (10-oared) Peake-class self-righting (P&S) lifeboat, an anonymous gift of lady 'M.P.G.', via Mr T. Jones-Gibb, built by Woolfe of Shadwell, London, costing £275.); Capsized on 20 January 1880, with the loss of two crew. |

Station Closed, 1882
Pre ON numbers are unofficial numbers used by the Lifeboat Enthusiast Society to reference early lifeboats not included on the official RNLI list.

== See also ==
- List of RNLI stations
- List of former RNLI stations
- Royal National Lifeboat Institution lifeboats
