= Newcastle Lifeboat Station =

RNLI lifeboat station in County Down, Northern Ireland

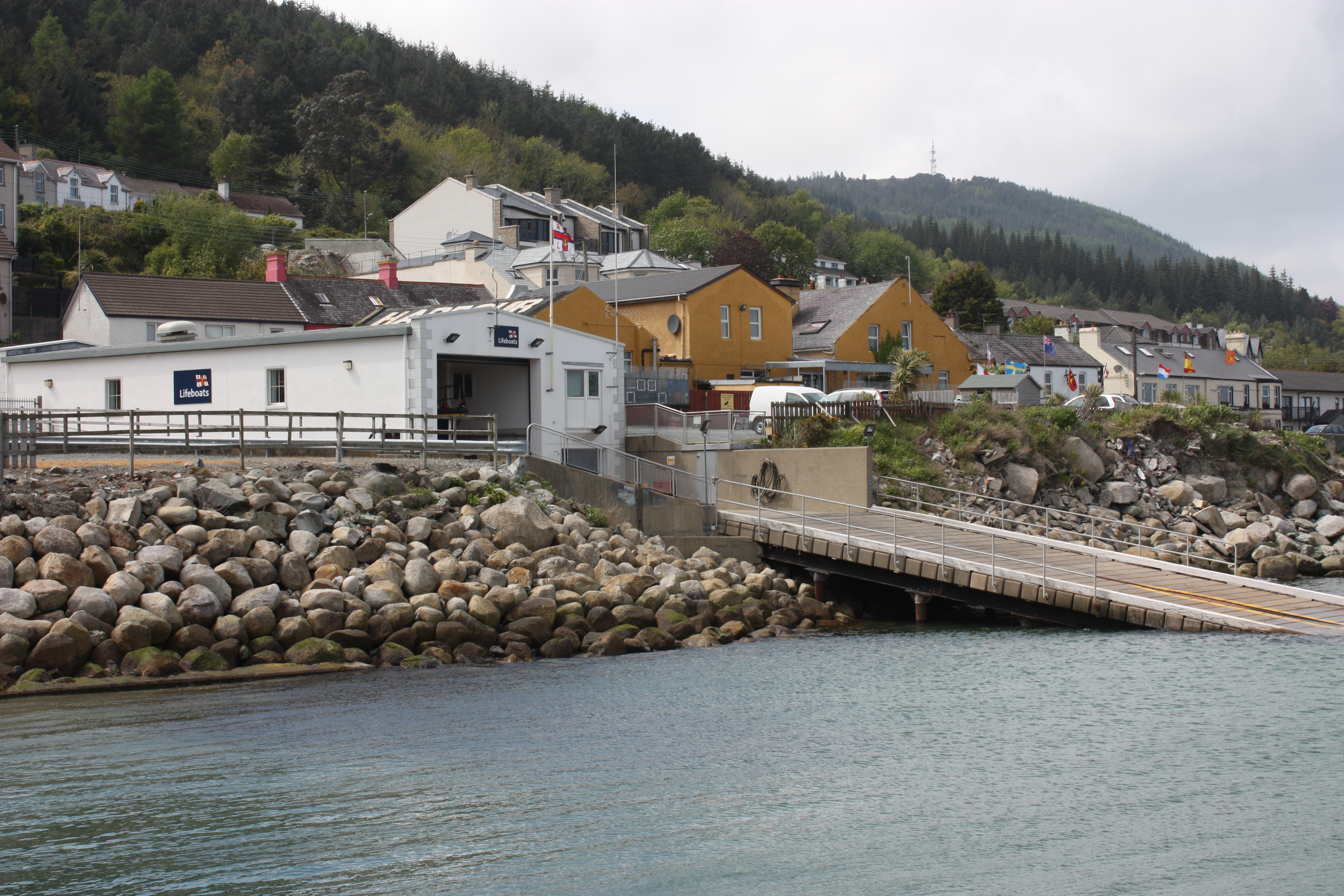
- Newcastle Lifeboat Station

- Location within Northern Ireland

General information
- Type: RNLI Lifeboat Station
- Location: Newcastle Lifeboat Station, South Promenade, Newcastle, County Down, BT33 0EX, Northern Ireland
- Coordinates: 54°11′53.2″N 5°53′13.6″W
- Opened: 1830–1833 RNIPLS; 1854–present RNLI
- Owner: Royal National Lifeboat Institution

Website
- Newcastle RNLI Lifeboat Station

Newcastle Lifeboat Station is situated at South Promenade, Newcastle, a seaside town in County Down, located the foot of Slieve Donard, the highest of the Mourne Mountains, overlooking the Irish Sea, in the south east corner of Northern Ireland.

A lifeboat was first stationed at Newcastle in 1830 by the Royal National Institution for the Preservation of Life from Shipwreck (RNIPLS), on station until 1833. A station was re-established by the Royal National Lifeboat Institution (RNLI) in 1854.

The station currently operates the B-class (Atlantic 85) Inshore lifeboat, Berylium (B-955), on station since 2025, and the smaller D-class (IB1) Inshore lifeboat, Cameronian (D-908), also on station since 2025.

== History ==
In 1825, the newly formed County Down branch of the Royal National Institution for the Preservation of Life from Shipwreck (RNIPLS) established Rossglass Lifeboat Station, when an 18-foot-long (5.5 m) lifeboat was placed at Rossglass, Co. Down.

Thomas Foy, Coxswain of the Rossglass Lifeboat, was awarded the RNIPLS Silver Medal, one of the earliest awarded, for putting out at 02:00 in a fishing boat with five men on 2 December 1825, and saving seven of the nine crew off the vessel Usk, on passage from Liverpool to Spain, when she was wrecked in a violent weather. Between 1825 and 1852, no less than 15 gallantry medals were awarded by the RNIPLS in the area.

A 24-foot lifeboat built by William Plenty of Newbury, Berkshire, costing £130, was placed at Arklow on 30 November 1826. Only 3½ years later, having never been launched on service, and on the recommendation of Capt. Samuel Sparshott, Deputy Inspector General of Coastguard, the lifeboat was relocated in April 1830, and Newcastle Lifeboat Station was established. No records have been found of any service, and in 1833, the station closed, with the boat relocated again, this time to Skerries.

The Rossglass lifeboat station was closed in 1835, the lifeboat being relocated to St John's Point Lifeboat Station, just 2 miles (3.2 km) further down the headland, next to H.M. Coastguard station at St Johns Point, remaining there until 1843.

In 1843, the St John's lifeboat was condemned and sold. No replacement was provided. The 1840s was a period of decline for the RNIPLS, with little income, and especially following the death in 1847, of the founder, Sir William Hillary, Bt. However, under the direction of The Duke of Northumberland, appointed as president in 1851, the RNIPLS was resurrected, becoming the RNLI in 1854.

Newcastle Lifeboat Station was re-established in 1854 by the RNLI. A boathouse was provided by The Earl of Annesley MP. A 27 ft (8.2 m) self-righting 'Pulling and Sailing' (P&S) lifeboat, one with oars and sails, arrived in 1854, but weighing two tons, was found to be too heavy for the location. The lifeboat was withdrawn the following year, later stationed at Castletown, and a replacement 26 ft (7.9 m) lifeboat arrived at Newcastle. In 1858, a larger 30 ft (9.1 m) unnamed lifeboat was placed on station, this one serving until 1881, being named Reigate in 1868.

Reigate was launched on 26 February 1874, to the aid of the schooner Rose, when she was wrecked in Dundrum Bay. One of the five crew of the Rose was lost, but four were rescued. Coxswain James Hill, and Capt. Charles Grey-Jones, second assistant Inspector of Lifeboats, were each awarded the RNLI Silver Medal.

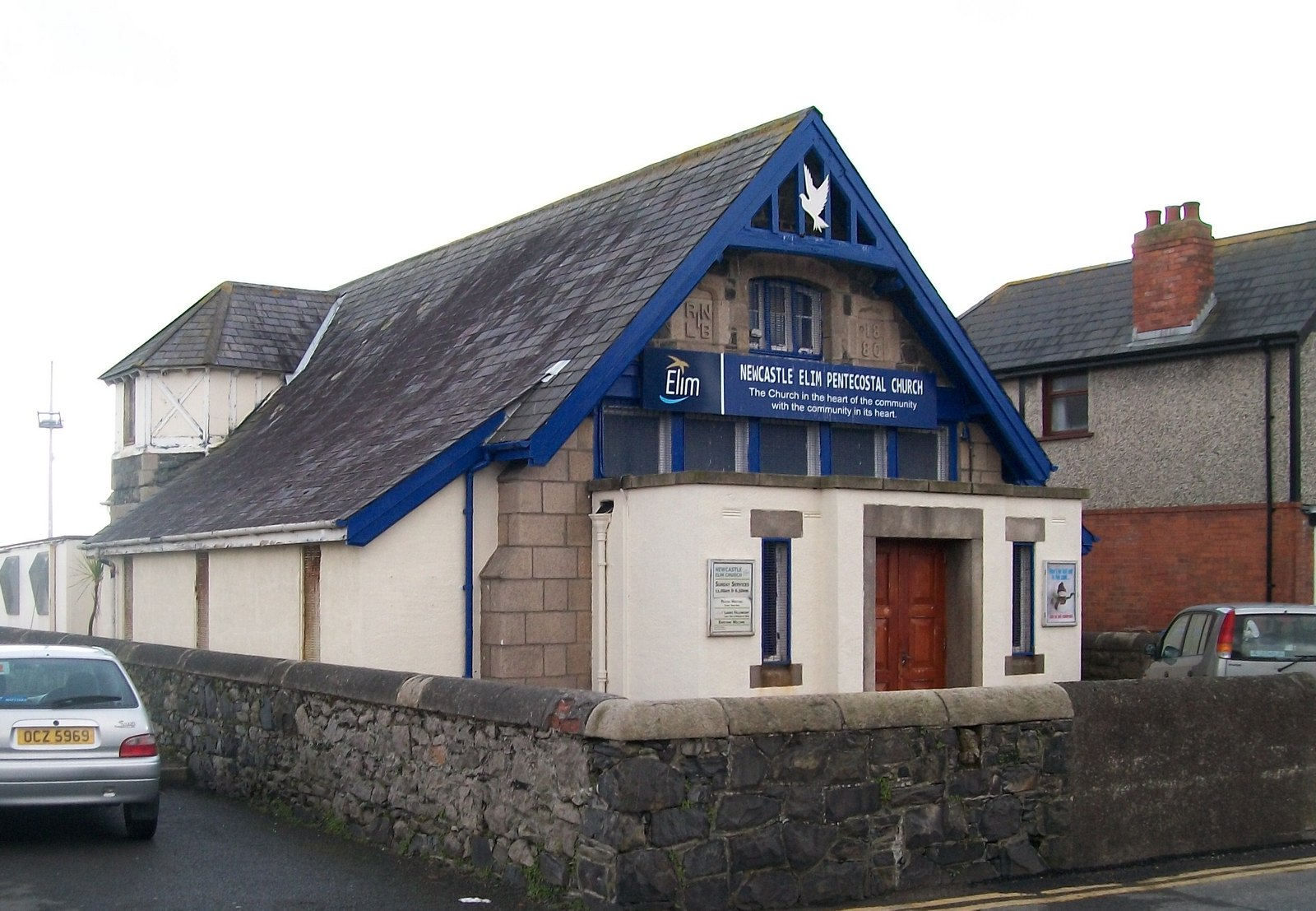
1881 Newcastle Lifeboat House

Reigate was replaced in 1881, by a new 34 ft (10 m) lifeboat, Farnley (ON 283). A new boathouse was required, and was constructed at a cost of £425. The building, used until the 1930s, still stands on Downs Road, and is currently used by the Newcastle Elim Pentecostal Church.

On 15 March 1905, 20 lives were saved from the French barque Cannebiere, in a joint effort by the Newcastle lifeboat Farnley, and the tugboat Flying Irishman, in a service lasting over 14 hours. The vessel, on passage from Glasgow to New Caledonia, was sheltering from a storm in Dundrum Bay, but ran aground after dragging her anchor. John McCausland, Master of the tug, and Coxswain Superintendent James Foland of Newcastle lifeboat, were awarded a 'Gold Medal and Diploma' by the French Government, presented in 1906 by the Lord Mayor of Belfast, Sir Daniel Dixon, 1st Baronet.

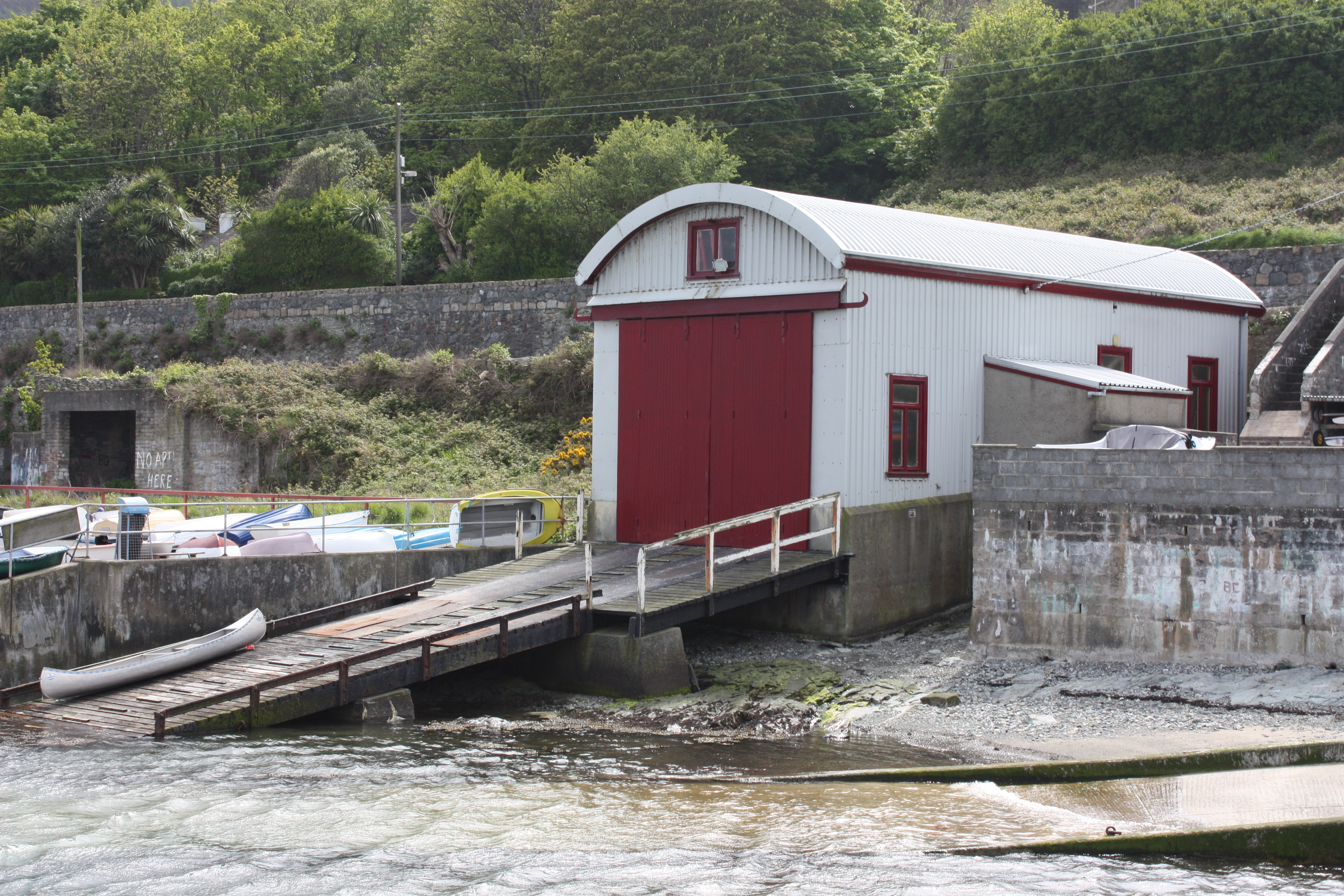
1936 Newcastle Lifeboat House

A new station with slipway was constructed in 1936. This was followed by the arrival of a 35 ft (11 m) self-righting (motor) lifeboat, L. P. and St Helen (ON 703), built in 1927, and having previously served at Eastbourne and Boulmer.

In a remarkable one-year period of service during World War II, Newcastle lifeboat L. P. and St Helen would be involved in three medal rescues, and see 10 medals awarded for gallantry. Coxswain Patrick Murphy would receive the RNLI Bronze Medal for a service on 19–21 January 1941, to the vessel Hoperidge. Murphy would receive a second bronze medal (second-service clasp) just 9 days later, when 14 men were rescued off the vessel Sandhill, which was damaged by a Naval Mine, with Mechanic Robert Agnew also receiving the RNLI bronze medal.

Just one year later, on 21 January 1942, in an exceptionally daring and skilful rescue, 39 people were rescued from the convoy steamship Browning, which had run aground in a south-east gale near Ballyquintin. After several attempts to get close, the Coxswain manoeuvered the lifeboat through the rocks, and managed to get the 39 people aboard. Now dangerously overloaded, he took the boat out over a reef, judging the waves perfectly. With weather too poor to return home, the lifeboat made for Portavogie. Seven medals for gallantry were awarded, with Murphy being awarded the RNLI Gold Medal. He would also be awarded the Medal of the Order of the British Empire for Meritorious Service (BEM).

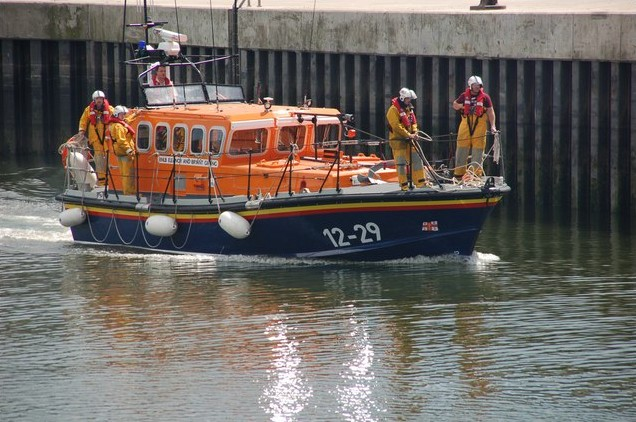
Newcastle's Mersey-class lifeboat 12-29 Eleanor and Bryant Girling (ON 1188)

In 1992, the RNLI would receive an extraordinary bequest, a sum of £4 million from the estate of Mrs Eugenie Boucher, specifically to be used for the construction of new boathouses. A native of Penza in Russia, eight so named 'Penza' boathouses would be constructed, including one for Newcastle. Built on the site of the tractor house and coastguard hut, the building was completed in August 1993. Then followed the arrival on 11 August 1993, of a new Mersey-class lifeboat, 12-29 Eleanor and Bryant Girling (ON 1188), funded from the bequest of Eleanor Bertha Girling.

On 24 January 1994, a D-class (EA16) Inshore lifeboat was placed on service for the season, for evaluation. A permanent D-class lifeboat was placed at the station on 19 May 1995. Initiated by Wing Cdr. Mark Codgebrook, £11,000 had been raised by the personnel at RAF Aldergrove, and at a ceremony on 10 June 1995, Group Captain R. E. Wedge named the boat Aldergrove (D-478).

Aldergrove II (D-637). a second boat funded by the personnel at RAF Aldergrove, was retired on 3 December 2014. Newcastle would receive the D-class (IB1) Inshore lifeboat Eliza (D-775), funded from the bequest of Mary Olga Illingworth, in memory of her mother.

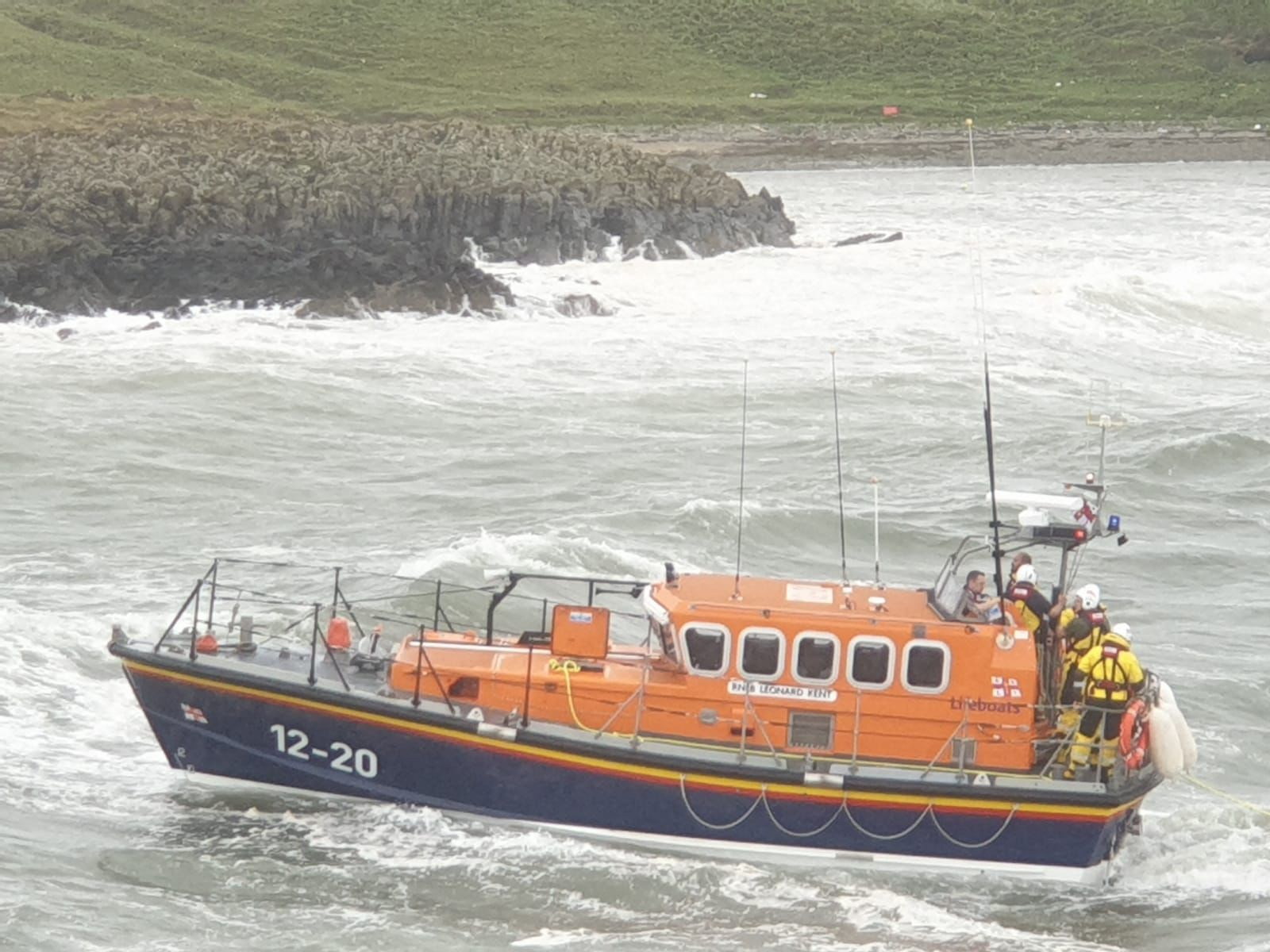
Newcastle's Mersey-class lifeboat 12-20 Leonard Kent (ON 1177)

Mersey-class lifeboat 12-29 Eleanor and Bryant Girling (ON 1188), on station since 1993, was withdrawn to the relief fleet in 2022, and replaced with a slightly older Mersey-class lifeboat, 12-20 Leonard Kent (ON 1177), previously stationed at Margate. Soon after, in 2023, Newcastle would receive T121, the newest of the 31 Talus MB-H Crawler launch tractors, built in 2003.

On 9 April 2025, it was announced that a B-class (Atlantic 85) Inshore lifeboat would be placed at Newcastle by the end of 2025, when the 34-year-old Mersey-class All-weather lifeboat was finally retired.

A new B-class (Atlantic 85) Inshore lifeboat, Berylium (B-955), went on service at Newcastle on 18 December 2025. The occasion also saw the formal withdrawal from service of the last RNLI Mersey-class All-weather lifeboat, 12-20 Leonard Kent (ON 1177). A ceremonial last launch and departure from the station took place on Sunday 11 January 2026. As of December 2025, four former RNLI Mersey-class lifeboats remain in service with rescue services in Chile and Uruguay.

== Station honours ==
The following are awards made at Newcastle, Co. Down:

- Medal of the Order of the British Empire for Meritorious Service (BEM)

Patrick Murphy, Coxswain – 1942

- RNIPLS Gold Medal
  Capt. John Row Morris, RN, H.M. Coastguard, Newcastle – 1826
- RNLI Gold Medal
  Patrick Murphy, Coxswain – 1942
- Gold Medal and Diploma, awarded by the French Government
  James Foland, Coxswain Superintendent – 1906
  John McCausland, Master of the tugboat Flying Irishman – 1906
- RNIPLS Silver Medal
  Alexander Douglas, Boatman, H.M. Coastguard, Newcastle – 1826
  James Taylor, Commissioned Boatman, H.M. Coastguard, Dundrum Bay – 1845
  James McCarthy, Chief Boatman, H.M. Coastguard, Dundrum Bay – 1852
- RNLI Silver Medal
  Capt. George Agar Ellis Ridge, RN, Inspecting Commander, H.M. Coastguard, Newcastle – 1860
  Capt. Charles Gray-Jones, RN, Second Assistant Inspector of Lifeboats – 1874
  James Hill, Coxswain – 1874
  Cmdr. Orford Summerville Cameron, RN, H.M. Coastguard, Newcastle – 1877
  William Murphy, Second Coxswain – 1942
  Robert Agnew, Mechanic – 1942
- RNLI Bronze Medal
  Patrick Murphy, Coxswain – 1941
  Patrick Murphy, Coxswain – 1941 (Second-Service clasp)
  Robert Agnew, Mechanic – 1941
  William Lenaghan, crew member – 1942
  Thomas McClelland, crew member – 1942
  Patrick McClelland, crew member – 1942
  Patrick Rooney, crew member – 1942
- 'The Thanks of the Institution inscribed on Vellum'
  Patrick McClelland, Coxswain – 1955
  John Lowry, Helm – 1998
- 'A Framed Letter of Thanks signed by the Chairman of the Institution'
  Mark Poland, crew member – 1998
  Brendan Rooney, crew member – 1998
  Mr Ian Williamson – 1998
  Newcastle Lifeboat Station – 2005
- Royal Humane Society Bravery Award
  Gerald Murphy, Motor Mechanic – 1966
- Certificate of Commendation, awarded by the Royal Humane Society
  Shane Rice – 2024
  Trez Denison – 2024
- Commendation from the Medical Director of the Institution
  Shane Rice – 2024
  Trez Denison – 2024
- Member, Order of the British Empire (MBE)
  Hugh Patrick Paul, Boathouse Manager – 2006NYH
  John Francis Morgan, Coxswain – 2010NYH

== Newcastle lifeboats ==
=== Pulling and Sailing (P&S) lifeboats ===
ON (Note: ON is the RNLI's Official Number of the boat.)	Name	Built	On station	Class	Comments
Pre-123	Unnamed	1826	1830–1833	24-foot Plenty	(Note: 24 ft 0 in (7.32 m) x 8 ft 0 in (2.44 m) (8-oared) Plenty-class non-self-righting lifeboat, funded by the RNIPLS, built by William Plenty of Newbury, Berkshire, costing £130 when new.); Previously at Arklow. Transferred to Skerries.
Pre-279	Unnamed	1854	1854–1855	27-foot Peake self-righting (P&S)	(Note: 27 ft 0 in (8.23 m) x 7 ft 6 in (2.29 m) (8-oared) Peake-class self-righting (P&S) lifeboat, funded by the RNLI, built by Forrestt of Limehouse, London, costing £135.); Transferred to Castletown.
Pre-296	Unnamed	1855	1855–1859	26-foot Peake self-righting (P&S)	(Note: 26 ft 0 in (7.92 m) x 6 ft 0 in (1.83 m) (6-oared) Peake-class self-righting (P&S) lifeboat, funded by the RNLI, built by Forrestt of Limehouse, London, costing £161.); Transferred to Thorpeness.
Pre-331	Unnamed	1858	1858–1868	30-foot Peake self-righting (P&S)	(Note: 30 ft 0 in (9.14 m) x 6 ft 3 in (1.91 m) (6-oared) Peake-class self-righting (P&S) lifeboat, funded by the RNLI, built by Forrestt of Limehouse, London, costing £136.); Named Reigate in 1868.
Pre-331	Reigate	1858	1868–1881	30-foot Peake self-righting (P&S)	(Note: Funded from the collections of Mr E. Chambers.); Sold in 1881.
283	Farnley	1880	1881–1906	34-foot self-righting (P&S)	(Note: 34 ft 0 in (10.36 m) x 8 ft 0 in (2.44 m) (10-oared) self-righting (P&S) lifeboat, gift of Mr E. Armitage, RA, of London, built by Woolfe of Shadwell, London, costing £363.); Used for demonstration purposes as Reserve No. D10, until being broken up in 1913.
556	Marianne	1906	1906–1917	35-foot self-righting (P&S)	(Note: 35 ft 0 in (10.67 m) x 8 ft 6 in (2.59 m) (10-oared) self-righting (P&S) lifeboat, legacy of Col. J. A. Hay of Cheltenham, built by Thames Ironworks of Blackwall, London, costing £823.); Transferred to Port St Mary.
660	John Cleland	1916	1917–1932	35-foot Dungeness self-righting (P&S)	(Note: 35 ft 0 in (10.67 m) x 8 ft 10 in (2.69 m) (10-oared) Dungeness-class (Rubie) self-righting (P&S) lifeboat, legacy of Mr J. Cleland of Downpatrick, built by S. E. Saunders of Cowes, costing £1,865.); Transferred to the relief fleet. Sold in 1935
553	John	1906	1933–1937	35-foot Liverpool (P&S)	(Note: 35 ft 0 in (10.67 m) x 10 ft 0 in (3.05 m) (12-oared) Liverpool-class non-self-righting (P&S) lifeboat, legacy of Mr J. A. Hay of Cheltenham, built by Thames Ironworks of Blackwall, London, costing £973.); Previously at Cloughey. Sold in 1937.

Pre ON numbers are unofficial numbers used by the Lifeboat Enthusiasts' Society to reference early lifeboats not included on the official RNLI list.

=== All-weather lifeboats ===
ON	Op.No. (Note: Op. No. is the RNLI's Operational Number of the boat carried on the hull.)	Name	Built	On station	Class	Comments
703	–	L. P. and St Helen	1927	1937–1949	35-foot self-righting (motor)	(Note: 35-foot x 8-foot 10in self-righting (motor) lifeboat, legacies of Miss Lovelock, Mr Pett and Miss Turner, with a single 35-hp Halford petrol engine, built by S. E. Saunders of Cowes, costing £4,961.); Previously at Eastbourne and Boulmer. Sold in 1949.
870	–	William and Laura	1949	1949–1980	Liverpool	
974	37-07	Jane Hay	1964	1980–1992	Oakley	Previously at St Abbs.
942	37-01	J. G. Graves of Sheffield	1958	1992–1993	Oakley	Previously at Scarborough and Clogherhead.
1188	12-29	Eleanor and Bryant Girling	1992	1993–2022	Mersey	
1177	12-20	Leonard Kent	1991	2022–2025	Mersey	Previously at Margate

All-weather lifeboat withdrawn, 18 December 2025
More post-service details can be found on the respective lifeboat class pages.

=== Inshore lifeboats ===
==== D class ====
Op.No.	Name	On station	Class	Comments
D-333	Unnamed	1994	D-class (EA16)	
D-478	Aldergrove	1995–2005	D-class (EA16)	
D-637	Aldergrove II	2005–2014	D-class (IB1)	
D-775	Eliza	2014–2025	D-class (IB1)	
D-908	Cameronian	2025–	D-class (IB1)	

==== B class ====
Op.No.	Name	On station	Class	Comments
B-863	David Porter MPS	2025	B-class (Atlantic 85)	Training
B-955	Berylium	2025–	B-class (Atlantic 85)	

=== Launch and recovery tractors ===
Op.No.	Reg. No.	Type	On station	Comments
T7	AF 4215	Clayton	1924–1932	
T44	KGJ 57	Case LA	1949–1958	
T45	KGJ 58	Case LA	1958–1963	
T53	KXT 421	Case LA	1963–1967	
T44	KGJ 57	Case LA	1967–1969	
T50	KLA 84	Case LA	1969–1977	
T59	OJJ 866	Fowler Challenger III	1977–1985	
T61	PLA 561	Fowler Challenger III	1985–1988	
T104	E269 YUJ	Talus MB-H Crawler	1988–1999	
T119	N470 XAW	Talus MB-H Crawler	1999–2006	
T118	M224 SNT	Talus MB-H Crawler	2006–2022	
T120	P514 HAW	Talus MB-H Crawler	2022–2023	
T121	DX04 YZG	Talus MB-H Crawler	2023–	
TW58H	DX53 VRF	Talus MB-4H Hydrostatic (Mk.2)	2025–	

== See also ==
- List of RNLI stations
- List of former RNLI stations
- Royal National Lifeboat Institution lifeboats
- Talus Atlantic 85 DO-DO launch carriage
