= Skerries Lifeboat Station =

RNLI lifeboat station in County Dublin, Ireland

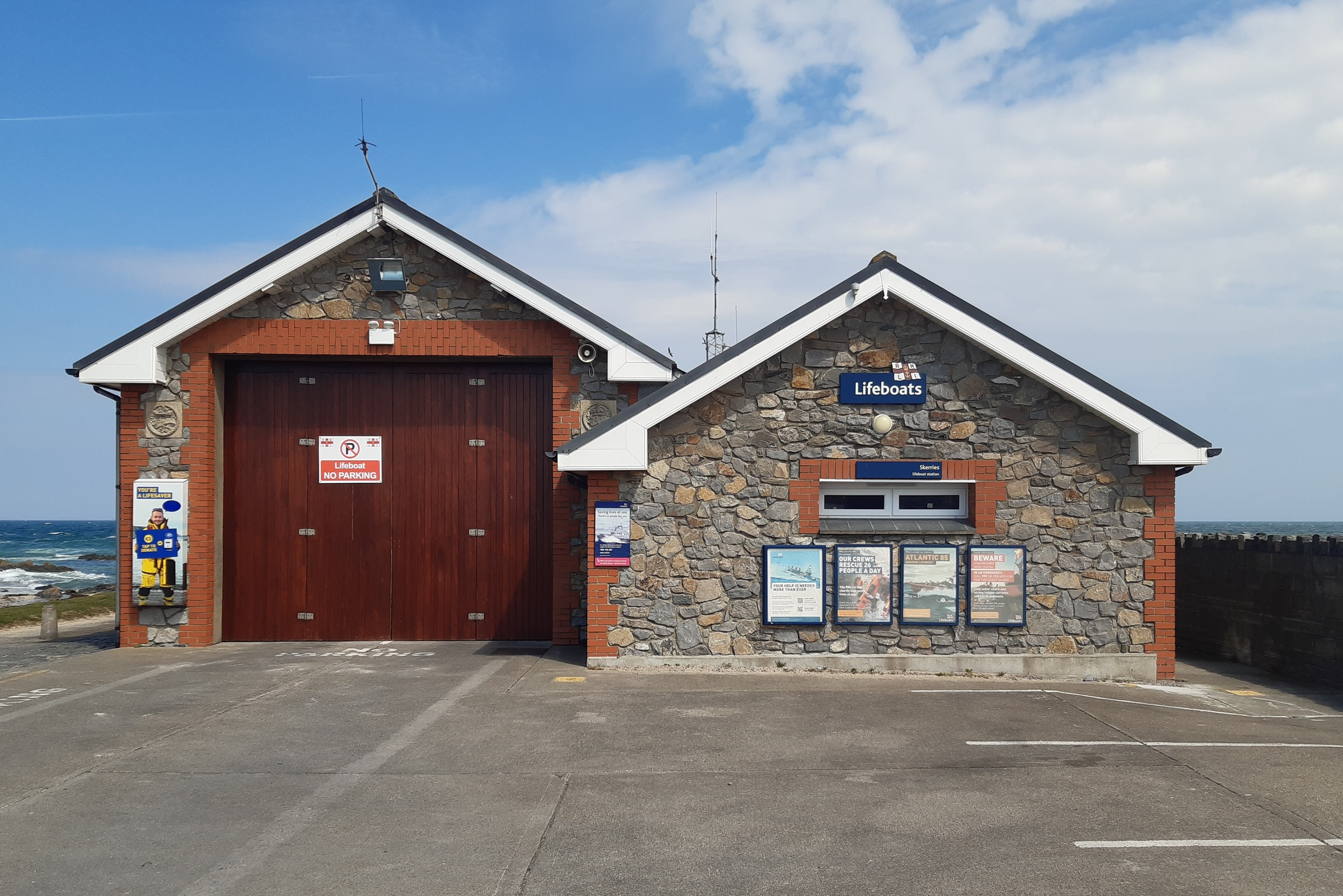
- Skerries Lifeboat Station

- Location within Ireland

General information
- Type: RNLI Lifeboat Station
- Location: Skerries Lifeboat Station, Harbour Road, Skerries, County Dublin, Ireland
- Coordinates: 53°35′09.9″N 6°06′20.5″W
- Opened: RNIPLS 1833–1838; RNLI 1855–1930; RNLI ILB 1981–present
- Owner: Royal National Lifeboat Institution

Website
- Skerries RNLI Lifeboat Station

Skerries Lifeboat Station is situated at Harbour Road, on Red Island, a tied island at Skerries, County Dublin, a town approximately 31 kilometres (19 mi) north of Dublin in the administrative region of Fingal, on the east coast of Ireland.

A lifeboat was first stationed at Skerries in 1833 by the Royal National Institution for the Preservation of Life from Shipwreck (RNIPLS), but the station closed just five years later in 1838. A station was re-established by the Royal National Lifeboat Institution (RNLI) in 1855.

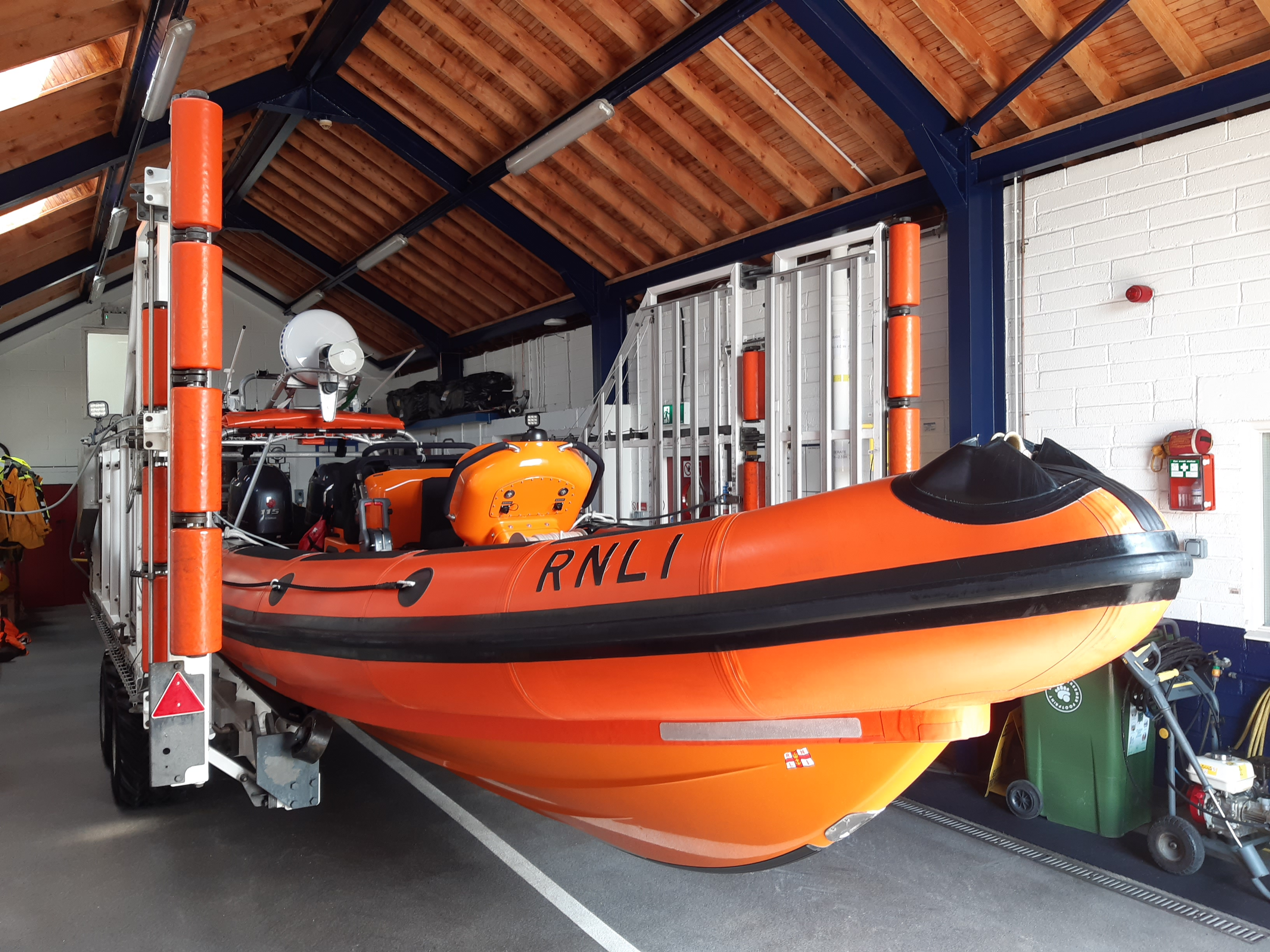
Skerries B-class (Atlantic 85) Inshore lifeboat, Louis Simson (B-866)

The station currently operates a B-class (Atlantic 85) Inshore lifeboat, Louis Simson (B-866), on station since 2013.

== History ==
A 24-foot lifeboat built by William Plenty of Newbury, Berkshire, costing £130, was initially placed at Arklow on 30 November 1826. This would be the first lifeboat station in Ireland. Just 3½ years later, having never been launched on service, the boat was relocated to Newcastle, County Down, in April 1930, and the Arklow station was closed.

Three years later, in 1833, the boat was transferred to Skerries, and was stationed there for five years until 1838, when it was transferred once again, this time to Rosslare Harbour. The boat was not replaced at Skerries.

On 21 January 1854, Ireland suffered one of its largest maritime disasters of the period, when the RMS Tayleur, lost in fog with a misreading compass, ran aground on Lambay Island, located mid-way between Skerries and Howth, approximately 3 miles (4.8 km) off the mainland. The passenger ship, named after Charles Tayleur, founder of the Vulcan Foundry at Bank Quay, Warrington. was on its maiden voyage from Liverpool to Melbourne, Australia. After initially hitting the rocks, the vessel was washed back into deeper water, and sank, with the estimated loss of 362 lives.

In the 1854 October edition of 'The Lifeboat', it was announced that a 29 ft (8.8 m) lifeboat, built by Forrestt of Limehouse, based on Mr Peake's (self-righting) design, was ready to be transported to the station, along with her new carriage, built by Ransome and Sims of Ipswich, aboard the British and Irish Steam Packet Company vessel Foyle. A boathouse was constructed, at a cost of £98, on a site provided by James Hans Hamilton, MP., and a "local committee of gentlemen" had been created, with Hans Hamilton Woods as chairman, and Henry Alex Hamilton appointed as honorary secretary.It was also reported that considerable contributions had been forthcoming from the residents of the local area, as detailed on issue 12 page 119 of The Life-boat.

The recent wrecks of the Tayleur and of the brig Agnes in this locality will probably be remembered by many of our readers as amongst those which have pointed it out as a desirable one for a life-boat station.

— The Life-Boat, Vol. I, Issue. 14, Page. 162, October 1854

The Austrian brig Tregiste was stranded in a gale on 14 November 1858, between Lambay Island and Portrane. Joint Honorary Secretary for the Skerries and Balbriggan Branches of the RNLI, Henry Alexander Hamilton, JP, Chief Boatman with H.M. Coastguard, Balbriggan, took charge of the lifeboat, which was launched at 11:00 on 15 November. Conditions were too rough to make progress, and the lifeboat had to put back to Rogerstown. There the crew waited until 17 November for a break in the weather, reaching the vessel, and rescuing 13 men. For this service, Henry Alexander Hamilton was awarded the RNLI Gold Medal.

On 1 February 1873, the Skerries lifeboat Admiral Mitchell (1859) was launched on a bitterly cold night, to the schooner Sarah of Runcorn. The vessel had wrecked on the rocky shore at Balbriggan. In an effort to get close, oars were broken, and control of the boat was lost. The lifeboat was anchored, but after an hour of riding the surf, the lifeboat capsized, and seven men were thrown into the water. Only the coxswain managed to regain the boat, which was then capsized twice more, fortunately with no more loss of life. A memorial to the six men lost stands in Holmpatrick Cemetery.

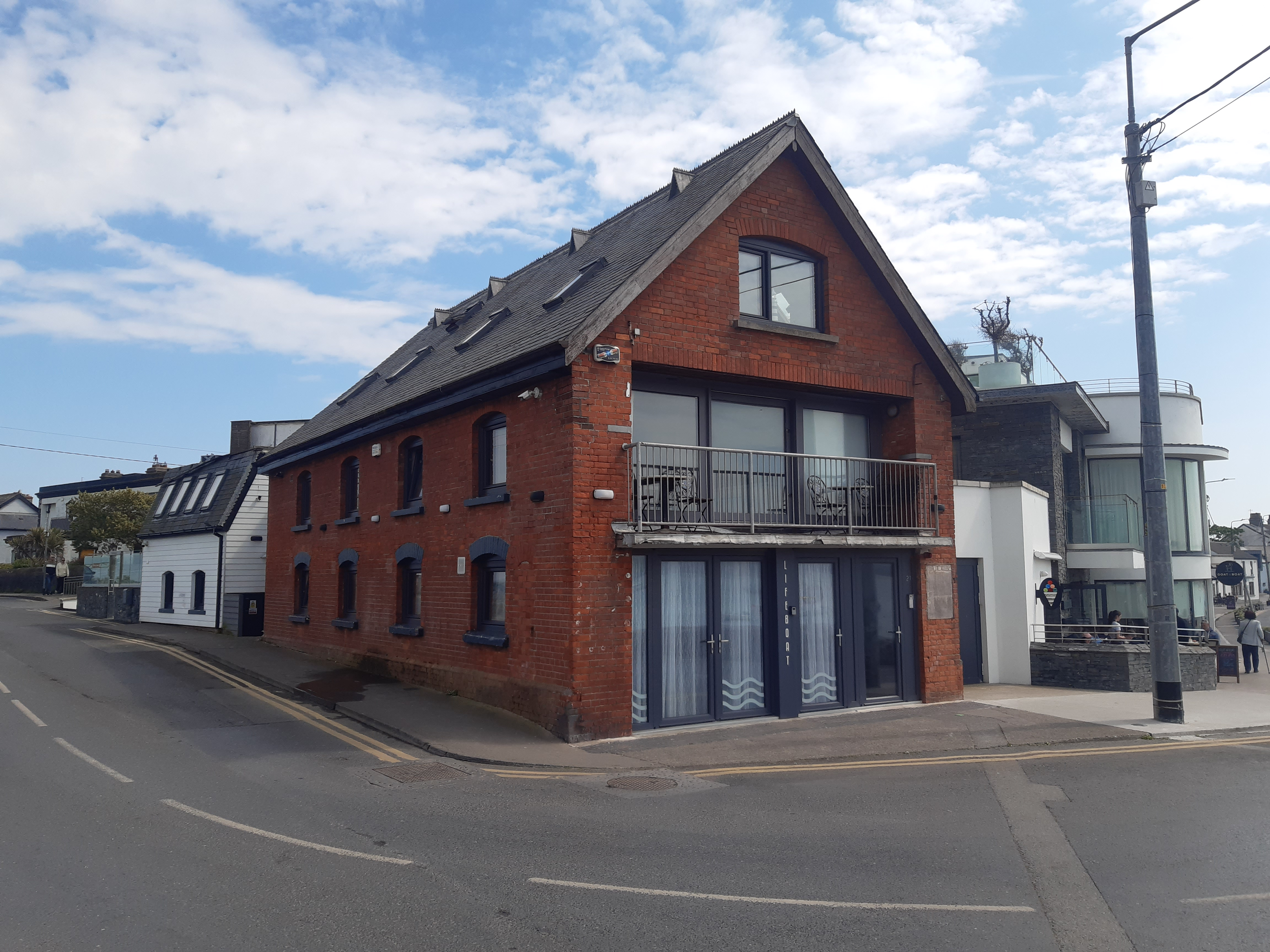
Skerries 1903 Lifeboat House

On service to the barque S. Vaughan of Windsor, Nova Scotia on the 23 October 1881, the Skerries lifeboat Laura Platt was being towed by a trawler, and capsized after the tow line parted. No lives were lost.

A new boathouse was constructed in 1903, costing £767, to house the William Maynard (ON 493), a 35-foot Liverpool (P&S) lifeboat, funded from the legacy of Rev. W. S. Maynard of Gressingham.

In 1930, a motor lifeboat, Lady Kylsant (ON 721), was placed at Howth, approximately 30 kilometres (19 mi) to the south. At that time, the Skerries lifeboat, William Maynard (ON 493), had been launched just seven times in 27 years. At a meeting of the RNLI committee of management on 17 July 1930, it was decided to close Skerries lifeboat station. The William Maynard was sold from service in 1931.

== 1981 onwards ==
In July 1981, it was decided to once again establish a lifeboat station at Skerries, and a D-class (RFD PB16) lifeboat (D-176) was placed on service. The station was formally opened on Sunday May 1 1983 by John Boland, Minister for the Public Service in the Republic of Ireland. In just under two years on service, the inshore boat had performed 11 rescues, and saved 13 lives.

Successful evaluation trials with held with the B-class (Atlantic 21) lifeboat Round Table (B-543) in 1997. The D-class (EA16) Helen Mitchell Scrimgeour (D-393) was withdrawn. Work began in April 1997 to construct a new boathouse for the Atlantic-class lifeboat and Talus MB-764 County launch tractor, which was completed in August 1997. On 22 June 1998, the B-class (Atlantic 75) lifeboat Rockabill (B-747) was placed at Skerries.

The current lifeboat is the B-class (Atlantic 85) Louis Simson (B-866), which arrived on 28 February 2013, and was funded from the bequest of Mrs Charlotte Jordon Simson.

== Station honours ==
The following are awards made at Skerries:

- RNLI Gold Medal
  Henry Alexander Hamilton, JP, Chief Boatman, H.M. Coastguard, Balbriggan – 1858,
  Joint Honorary Secretary for the Skerries and Balbriggan Branch of the RNLI.
- RNIPLS Silver Medal
  John Carter, Chief Officer, H.M. Coastguard, Skerries – 1828
- RNLI Silver Medal
  Alexander Bain, seaman – 1859
  John Payne, Chief Officer, H.M. Coastguard, Skerries – 1877

== Roll of honour ==
In memory of those lost whilst serving at Skerries:

- Lost when the lifeboat Admiral Mitchell capsized, whilst on service to the schooner Sarah of Runcorn, 1 February 1873.
  Albert Anning, Boatman, H.M. Coastguard (32)
  Richard Cochrane (40)
  William Fitzpatrick (20)
  Joseph Halpin (42)
  James Kelly (45)
  Patrick Reid (24)

== Skerries lifeboats ==
=== Pulling and Sailing (P&S) lifeboats ===
ON (Note: ON is the RNLI's Official Number of the boat.)	Name	Built	On station	Class	Comments
pre-123	Unnamed	1826	1833–1838	24-foot Plenty	(Note: 24 ft 0 in (7.32 m) x 8 ft 0 in (2.44 m) (8-oared) Plenty-class non-self-righting lifeboat, built by William Plenty of Newbury, Berkshire, costing £130 when new.); Previously at Arklow and Newcastle. Transferred to Rosslare Fort.
Station Closed 1833–1855
Pre-287	Unnamed	1854	1855–1859	29-foot 1in Peake self-righting (P&S)	(Note: 29 ft 1 in (8.86 m) x 7 ft 9 in (2.36 m) (10-oared) Peake-class self-righting (P&S) lifeboat, funded by the RNLI, built by Forrest of Limehouse, London, costing £143.); Transferred to Selsey.
Pre-332	Admiral Mitchell	1858	1859–1866	30-foot Peake self-righting (P&S)	(Note: 30 ft 0 in (9.14 m) x 6 ft 3 in (1.91 m) (6-oared) Peake-class self-righting (P&S) lifeboat, gift of Mrs B. Wood of Eltham, built by Forrest of Limehouse, London, costing £135 when new.); Previous at Great Yarmouth and Gorleston. Condemned in 1866.
Pre-352	Admiral Mitchell	1859	1866–1873	32-foot Peake self-righting (P&S)	(Note: 32 ft 0 in (9.75 m) x 8 ft 0 in (2.44 m) (10-oared) Peake-class self-righting (P&S) lifeboat, gift of Mrs B. Wood of Eltham, built by Forrest of Limehouse, London, costing £172 when new.); Previously Thomas Wilson at Whitburn. Capsized with the loss of six lives on 1 February 1873, and was subsequently sold.
Pre-574	Laura Platt	1873	1873–1888	33-foot Peake self-righting (P&S)	(Note: 33 ft 0 in (10.06 m) x 8 ft 6 in (2.59 m) (10-oared) Peake-class self-righting (P&S) lifeboat, gift of Mr T. Platt of Hadfield, Derbyshire, built by Forrest of Limehouse, London, costing £324.); Capsized 23–24 October 1881. Sold in 1888.
133	Sir Edward Blakeney	1888	1888–1903	34-foot self-righting (P&S)	(Note: 34 ft 0 in (10.36 m) x 8 ft 0 in (2.44 m) (10-oared) self-righting (P&S) lifeboat, legacy of Dr M. M. Mahoney of Chelsea, London, built by Edwards and Symes of Millwall, costing £434.); Broken up in 1903.
493	William Maynard	1902	1903–1930	35-foot Liverpool (P&S)	(Note: 35 ft 0 in (10.67 m) x 10 ft 0 in (3.05 m) (12-oared) Liverpool-class non-self-righting (P&S) lifeboat, legacy of Mr W. S. F. Maynard of Cressingham, Norfolk, built by Thames ironworks of Blackwall, London, costing £921.); Sold in 1931.

Station Closed, 1930
Pre ON numbers are unofficial numbers used by the Lifeboat Enthusiasts' Society to reference early lifeboats not included on the official RNLI list.

=== Inshore lifeboats ===
==== D class ====
Op.No. (Note: Op. No. is the RNLI's Operational Number of the boat carried on the hull.)	Name	On station	Class	Comments
D-176	Unnamed	1981–1982	D-class (RFD PB16)	
D-283	Unnamed	1982–1990	D-class (Zodiac III)	
D-393	Helen Mitchell Scrimgeour	1990–1997	D-class (EA16)	

==== B class ====
Op.No.	Name	On Station	Class	Comments
B-543	Round Table	1997–1998	B-class (Atlantic 21)	
B-747	Rockabill	1998–2012	B-class (Atlantic 75)	
B-754	Pride of Sherwood	2012–2013	B-class (Atlantic 75)	
B-866	Louis Simson	2013–	B-class (Atlantic 85)	

=== Launch and recovery tractors ===
Op.No.	Reg.No.	Type	On station	Comments
TW38	N469 XAW	Talus MB-764 County	1997–2003	
TW07	88-D-43711	Talus MB-764 County	2003–	

== See also ==
- List of RNLI stations
- List of former RNLI stations
- Royal National Lifeboat Institution lifeboats
- Talus Atlantic 85 DO-DO launch carriage
