= Ardmore Lifeboat Station =

Former RNLI lifeboat station in County Waterford, Ireland

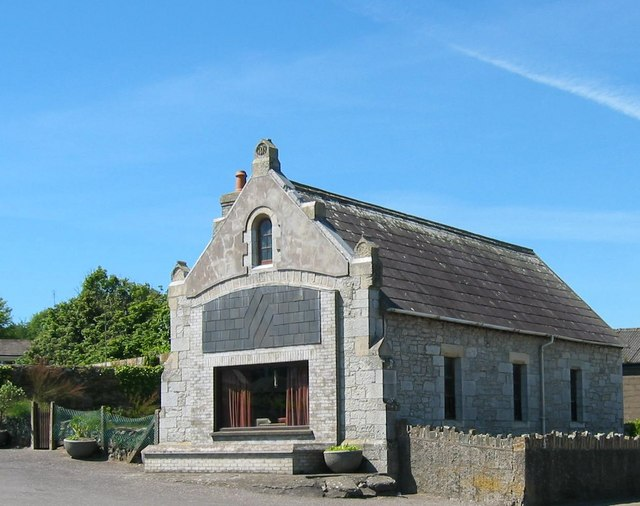
- 1877 Lifeboat House, Ardmore

- Location within Ireland

General information
- Status: Closed
- Type: RNLI Lifeboat Station
- Location: Main Street, Ardmore, County Waterford, Ireland
- Coordinates: 51°57′03.3″N 7°43′18.3″W
- Opened: 1858
- Closed: 1895

Ardmore Lifeboat Station was located at the junction of Main street and Cois Trá in Ardmore, County Waterford, a seaside resort and fishing village approximately 65 km (40 mi) south-west of Waterford, on the south coast of Ireland.

A lifeboat station was first established at Ardmore in 1858 by the Royal National Lifeboat Institution (RNLI).

After operating for 37 years, Ardmore Lifeboat Station closed in 1895.

== History ==
In the October 1858 edition of the RNLI journal 'The Lifeboat', it was announced that a lifeboat station had been established at Ardmore, in County Waterford, Ireland. A 28-foot 6-oared self-righting 'Pulling and Sailing' (P&S) lifeboat, one with oars and sails, had been placed at the station, along with a carriage for transportation. Local donations had contributed to the construction of a boathouse, and annual subscriptions had been promised towards the upkeep of the station.

Two more lifeboat were to be subsequently placed at Ardmore. No records of any launch or rescues are available.

The first of these was a larger 32-foot 10-oared boat, replacing the smaller 28-foot 6-oared lifeboat in 1865. The lifeboat was named Salomon at the request of an anonymous donor. Both old and new lifeboats, and carriages, were transported between London and Waterford free of charge by the British and Irish Steam Packet Company.

A new boathouse was commissioned in 1877, following a visit by the Inspector of Lifeboats. A fine granite building was constructed, at a cost of £255.

In September 1880, Ardmore would receive their third and final lifeboat. Funded by Miss A. M. Hooper of Bristol, the boat was named Hooper (ON 303). Again, both old and new lifeboats were given free passage, this time between London and Cork, by the City of Cork Steamship Company.

On Thursday, 14 February 1895, the RNLI committee of management read the report, following the visit to the station by the deputy Chief Inspector of Lifeboats. It was subsequently decided that Ardmore Lifeboat Station should be closed.

The fine granite built lifeboat house still remains, and is now a private residence. The lifeboat on station at the time of closure, Hooper (ON 303), was sold locally. No further history of the boat is available.

== Notable rescues ==
In a south-east gale on 26 December 1860, the brigantine Diana of Frederikshavn, on passage from Bordeaux to Belfast with a cargo of wheat and brandy, struck a reef in Ardmore Bay.

The Ardmore lifeboat was launched, with one vacant seat being filled by local gentleman John S. Roderick. The lifeboat initially failed to get close to the wreck, but eventually two lines were attached, and the lifeboat was pulled in close. Seven of the eight crew managed to get aboard the lifeboat, but one man was left aboard. When the wreck was driven closer inshore, he jumped into the sea with a makeshift raft, and was pulled ashore. It was reported that the lifeboat had been badly damaged. Four RNLI Silver Medals were awarded, including one to Mr. Roderick.

== Station honours ==
The following are awards made at Ardmore.

- RNLI Silver Medal

William Corbert, Coxswain – 1861
Richard Halse, boatman, H.M. Coastguard, Ardmore – 1861
William Stewart, boatman, H.M. Coastguard, Ardmore – 1861
John S. Roderick – 1861

- The Thanks of the Institution inscribed on Vellum

Rev. Wale, RC clergyman – 1861

== Ardmore lifeboats ==
=== Pulling and Sailing (P&S) lifeboats ===
ON (Note: ON is the RNLI's Official Number of the boat.)	Name	Built	On station	Class	Comments
Pre-328	Unnamed	1858	1858–1865	28-foot Peake Self-righting (P&S)	(Note: 28-foot x 6-foot (6-oared) Peake-class self-righting (P&S) lifeboat, built by Forrestt of Limehouse, London, costing £131.)
Pre-433	Salomon	1865	1865–1880	32-foot Prowse Self-righting (P&S)	(Note: 32-foot x 7-foot 5in (10-oared) Prowse-class self-righting (P&S) lifeboat, gift of 'A Friend', via Mr P. B. Mannion, built by Forrestt of Limehouse, London, costing £210.)
303	Hooper	1880	1880–1895	34-foot Self-righting (P&S)	(Note: 34-foot x 8-foot (10-oared) self-righting (P&S) lifeboat, gift of Miss Ann Hooper of Bristol, built by Woolfe of Shadwell, London, costing £363.)

Station Closed, 1895

Pre ON numbers are unofficial numbers used by the Lifeboat Enthusiast Society to reference early lifeboats not included on the official RNLI list.

== See also ==
- List of RNLI stations
- List of former RNLI stations
- Royal National Lifeboat Institution lifeboats
