= Whitburn Lifeboat Station =

Former lifeboat station in County Durham, England

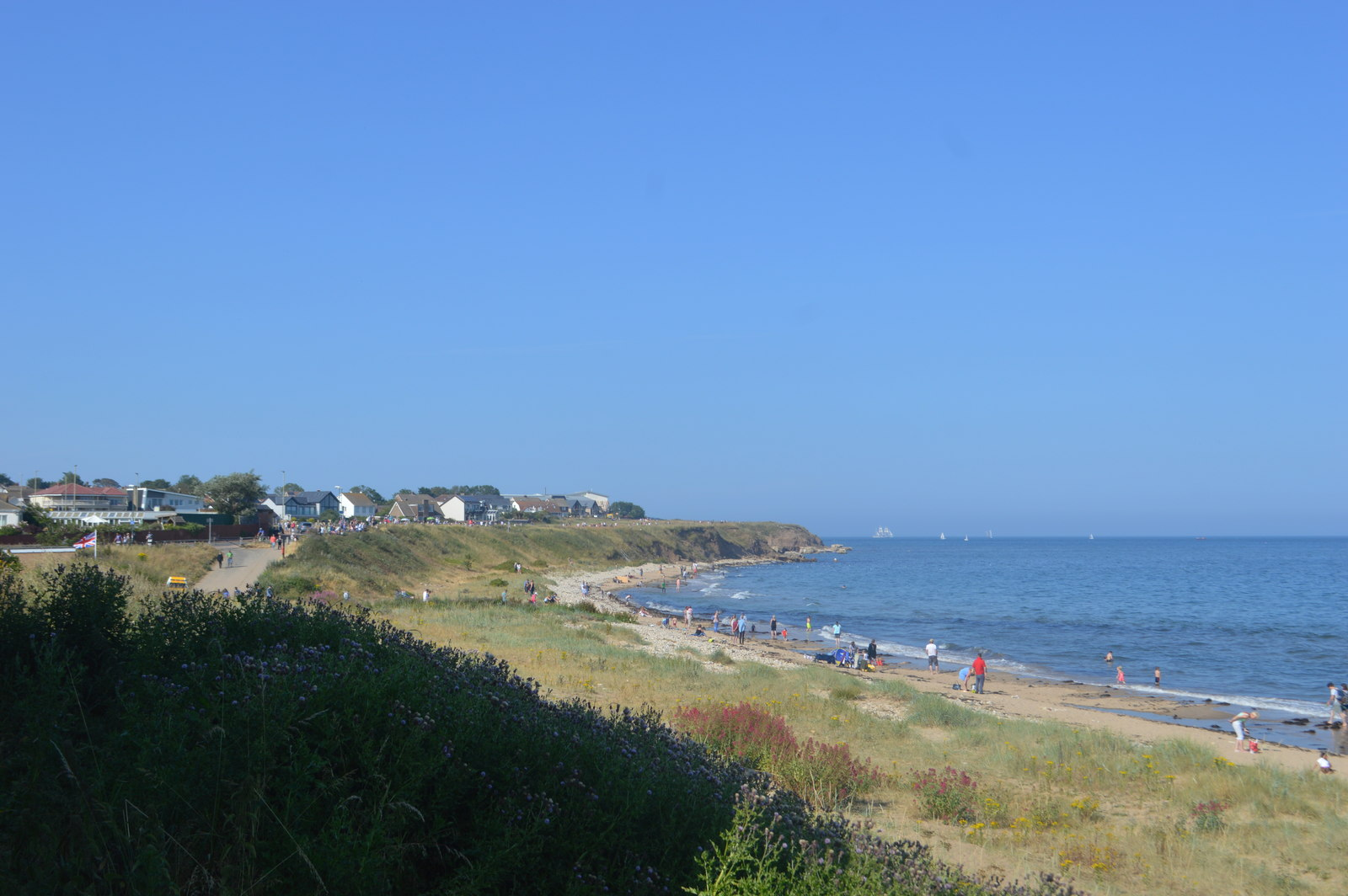
- Whitburn Bay

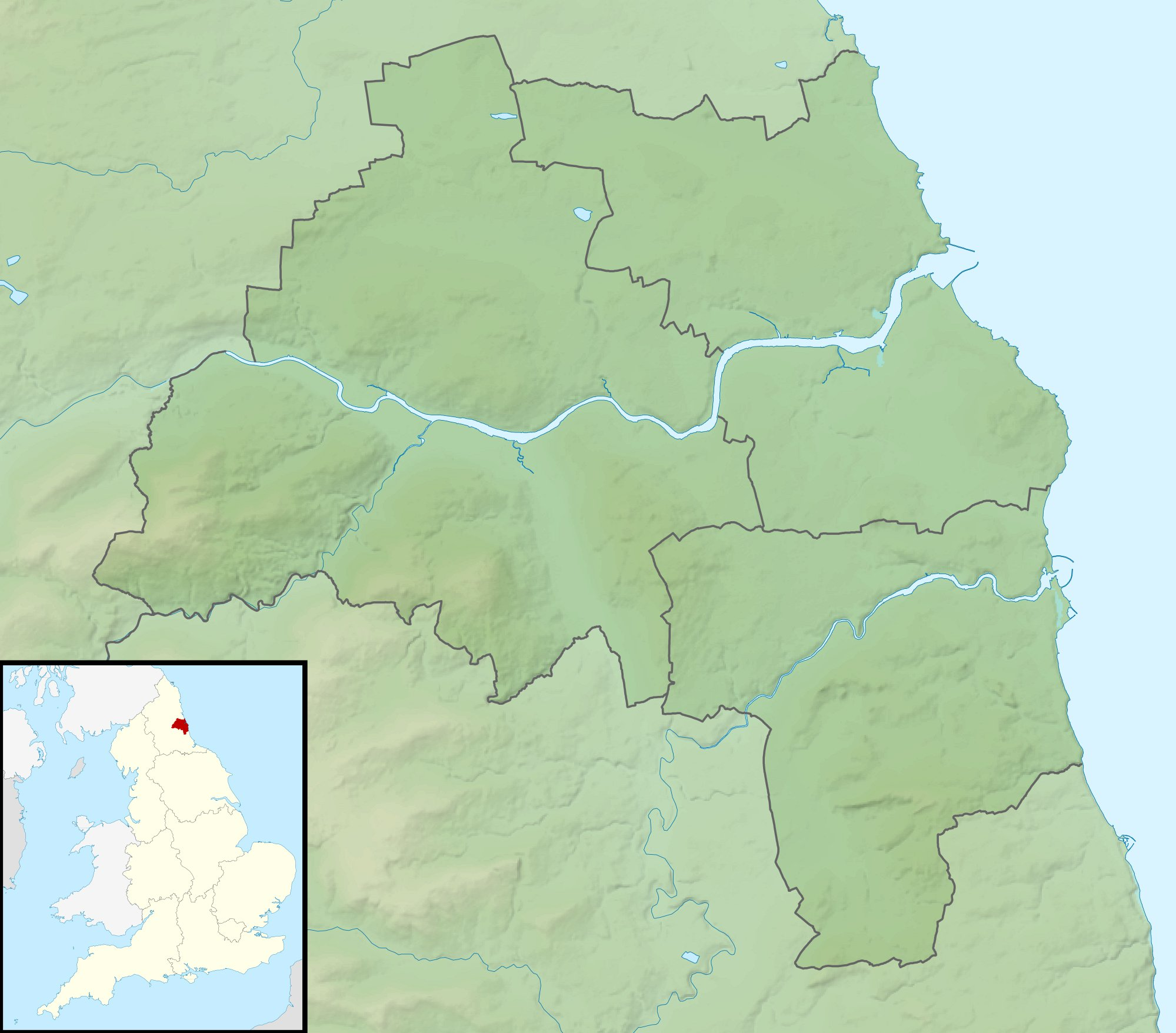
- Whitburn, Tyne and Wear

General information
- Type: RNLI Lifeboat Station
- Location: Whitburn Bents Rd, Whitburn, Tyne and Wear, SR6 7NX, England
- Coordinates: 54°56′39.2″N 1°21′52.6″W
- Opened: 1818–1854 SLC: 1854–1918 RNLI
- Closed: 1918

Whitburn Lifeboat Station was located at the lower end of Sea Lane, to the south of Whitburn, a village 3 miles (4.8 km) north of Sunderland, on the coast of the county of Tyne and Wear.

A lifeboat was first stationed at Whitburn in 1818, by the Sunderland Lifeboat Committee (SLC). Management of the station was transferred to the Royal National Lifeboat Institution (RNLI) in 1854.

After 100 years service, Whitburn Lifeboat Station closed at the end of April, 1918.

== History ==
Inspired by the rescue efforts made to the vessel Ajax, wrecked on her maiden voyage just north of Sunderland harbour, Lord Dundas set about raising funds for a lifeboat. Thus was created the Sunderland Lifeboat Committee.

In 1818, a new lifeboat station was opened at Whitburn by the Sunderland Lifeboat Committee, transferring a lifeboat from their 'North Side' station. A new boathouse was built at Marsden, on the north side of Whitburn. The 27-foot 6in boat had been built in 1800 by William Wake of Sunderland, influenced by the design of Henry Greathead. In 1830, Rev. Thomas Baker of Whitburn wrote to the Royal National Institute for the Preservation of Life From Shipwreck (RNIPLS) for help with the provision of a replacement lifeboat for Whitburn. With funds raised by the Rev. Baker, and a grant of £50 from Lloyd's, another 27-foot boat, costing £100, arrived in September 1830.

In May 1854, the Rev. Baker again wrote to the RNIPLS, requesting that the Institution take over the running of the station, which they did, with the Institution becoming the RNLI later that year. No detailed records of service are available, but it is noted that at least 70 lives were saved by the two boats.

The station was relocated in 1859, with a new boathouse constructed just to the south of Whitburn, at 'The Bents'. The RNLI also provided a new boat to Whitburn in 1859. A 32-foot self-righting 'Pulling and Sailing' (P&S) lifeboat, one with oars and sails, costing £172-1s-0d, was constructed by Forrestt of Limehouse, London. The boat was named Thomas Wilson, after the former chairman of the RNIPLS, a native of the area. On 12 January, 1864, battered by roughs seas, the Whitburn lifeboat saved the lives of seven crew from the steam-tug Rob-Roy, aground off Whitburn.

A replacement 32-foot lifeboat, provided again from RNLI funds, and again named Thomas Wilson, arrived on station in September 1865. In November 1866, the boat launched to the barque Margaret and Jane, aground on the rocks at Whitburn, and rescued eight people. Within 24 hours, she was launched again to the Caroline Elizabeth, rescuing 13 lives.

Two further lifeboats were placed at Whitburn. Provided by the gift of Miss C. L. Preston, they were both named William and Charles. They would be launched a total of 34 times, and save 107 lives. With the consideration that faster more capable motor lifeboats had been placed at Sunderland and Tynemouth, Whitburn Lifeboat Station was closed at the end of April, 1918.

The William and Charles (ON 500) was placed on the relief fleet for a further 8 years. No evidence of either boathouse remains, with the site of the 1859 boathouse at 'The Bents' now occupied by the clubhouse for the Whitburn Angling Club.

== Station honours ==
The following are awards made at Whitburn.

- RNLI Silver Medal

Eleanor Galbraith – 1855
William Rae, Fisherman – 1855

== Whitburn lifeboats ==
=== Sunderland Lifeboat Committee lifeboats ===
ON (Note: ON is the RNLI's Official Number of the boat.)	Name	Built	On service	Class	Comments
–	Unknown	1800	1818−1830	27-foot 6in North Country	(Note: 27-foot 6in x 9-foot 6in (10-oared) North Country non-self-righting lifeboat, gift of the Lord Dundas fund, plus a donation from Lloyd's of London, built by William Wake of Monkwearmouth, Sunderland, costing £185 when new.); Previously at Sunderland
Pre-147	Unknown	1830	1830−1859	27-foot 6in North Country	(Note: 27-foot 6in x 9-foot 6in (10-oared) North Country non-self-righting lifeboat, funded from local subscription plus donation from the RNIPLS, built by Thomas Wake of Sunderland, costing £100.)

Pre ON numbers are unofficial numbers used by the Lifeboat Enthusiast Society,
to reference early lifeboats not included on the official RNLI list.

=== RNLI lifeboats ===
==== Pulling and Sailing (P&S) lifeboats ====
ON	Name	Built	On service	Class	Comments
Pre-352	Thomas Wilson	1859	1859−1865	32-foot Peake Self-righting (P&S)	(Note: 32-foot x 8-foot (10-oared) Peake self-righting (P&S) lifeboat, from RNLI funds, built by Forrestt of Limehouse, London, costing £172.)
Pre-439	Thomas Wilson	1865	1865−1881	32-foot Prowse Self-righting (P&S)	(Note: 32-foot x 7-foot 4in (10-oared) Prowse-class self-righting (P&S) lifeboat, from RNLI funds, built by Forrestt of Limehouse, London, costing £252.)
179	William and Charles	1880	1881−1902	34-foot Self-righting (P&S)	(Note: 34-foot x 8-foot (10-oared) self-righting (P&S) lifeboat, gift of Miss C. L. Preston of Scarborough, built by Woolfe of Shadwell, London, costing £363.)
500	William and Charles	1902	1902−1918	35-foot Self-righting (P&S)	(Note: 35-foot x 8-foot 3in (10-oared) self-righting (P&S) lifeboat, gift of Miss C. L. Preston of Scarborough, built by Thames Ironworks of Blackwall, London, costing £781.)

== See also ==
- List of RNLI stations
- List of former RNLI stations
- Royal National Lifeboat Institution lifeboats
