= List of former RNLI stations =

Former RNLI lifeboat stations

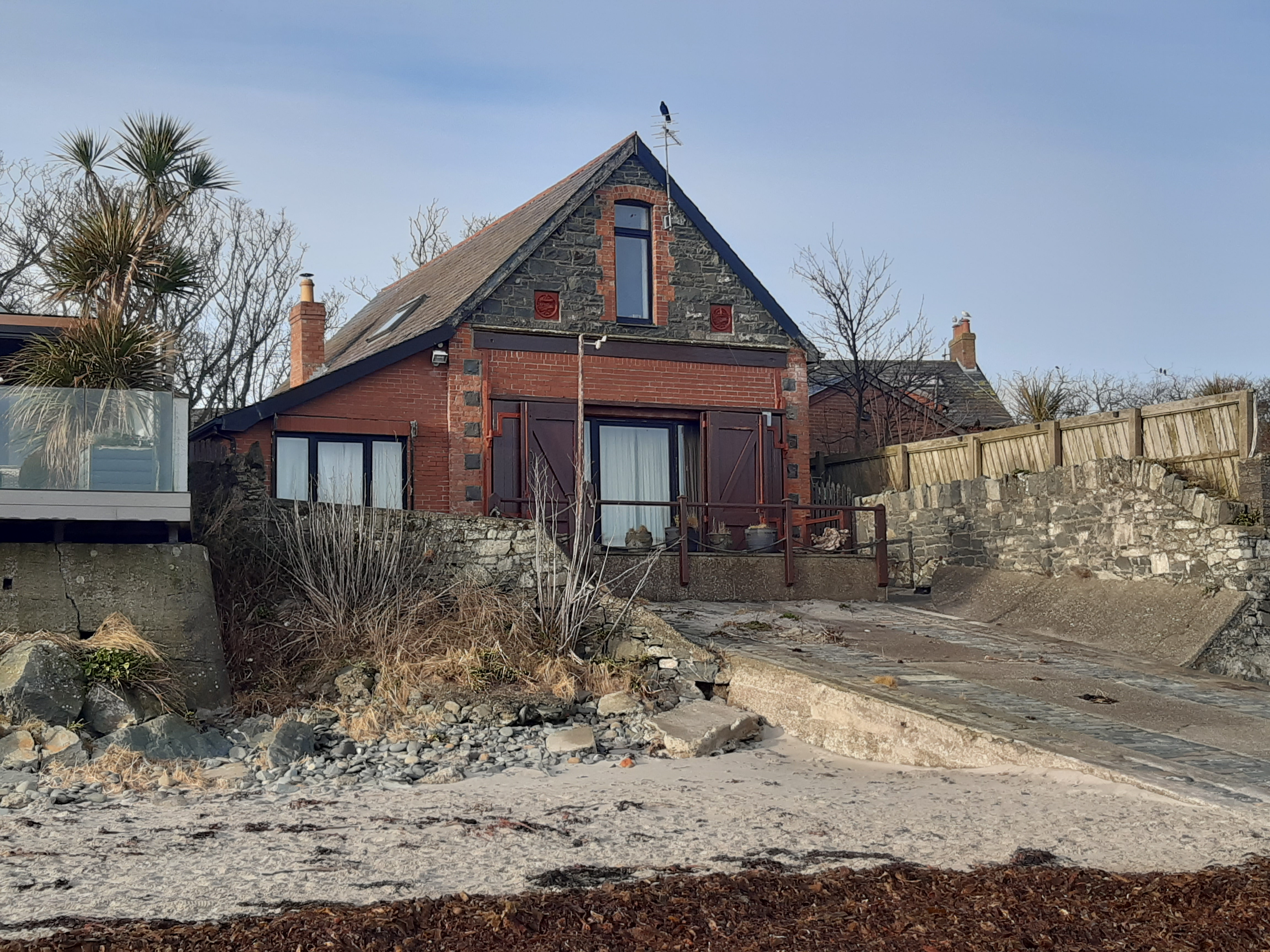
Former lifeboat station, Cloughey, NI

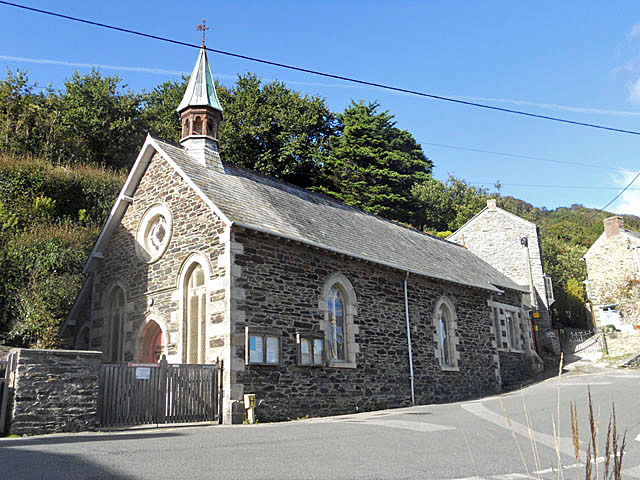
Former lifeboat station, Portloe

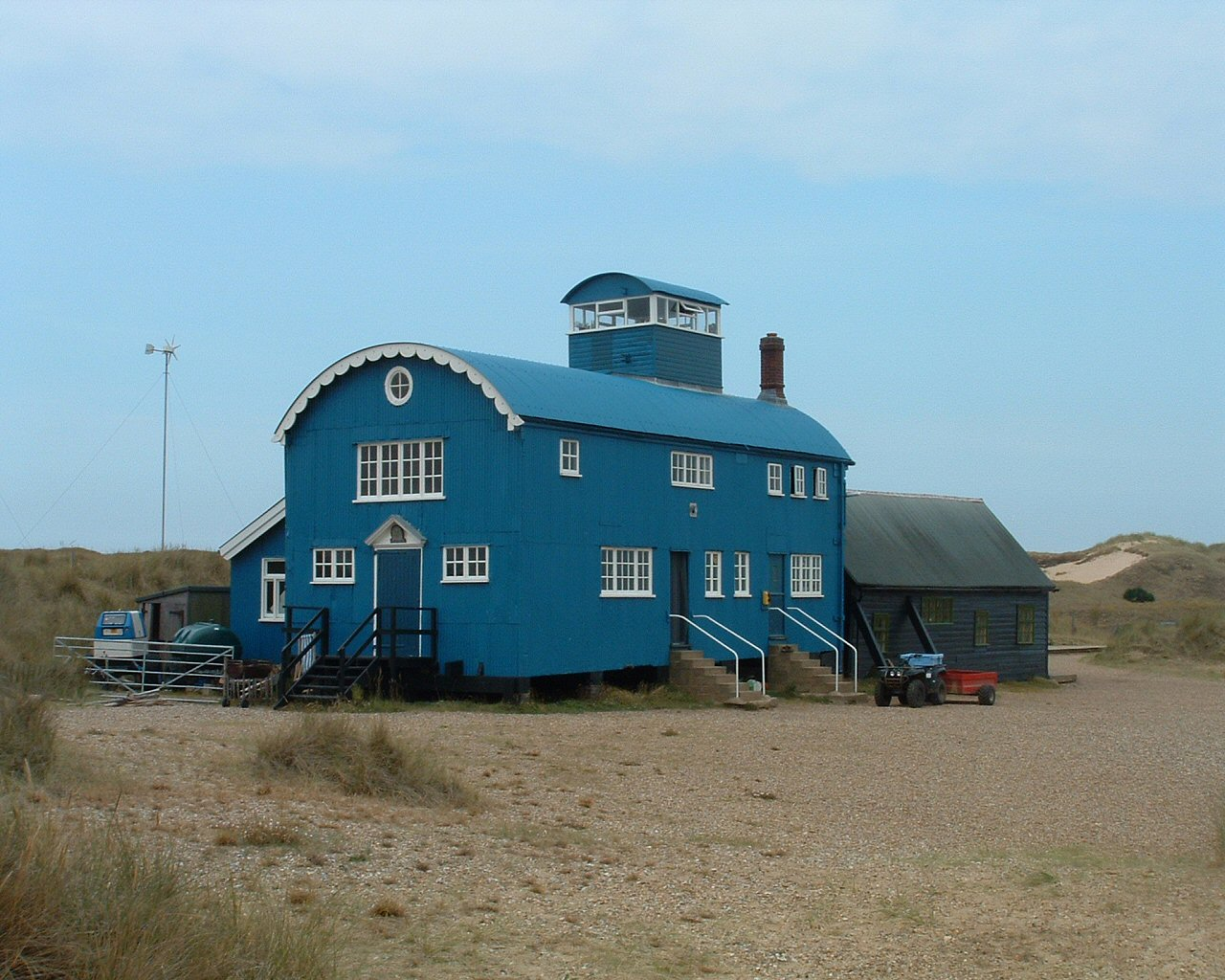
Former lifeboat station, Blakeney

Former RNLI stations can be found all around the coast of the entire British Isles, and were the locations for a fleet of rescue lifeboats.

The service was established in 1824 as the Royal National Institute for the Preservation of Life from Shipwreck (RNIPLS), later to become the Royal National Lifeboat Institution (RNLI) in 1854, and is operated largely by volunteers. Its headquarters are now at Poole in Dorset and it is a registered charity in both the United Kingdom and Republic of Ireland.

In the days before motor-powered vessels, lifeboat stations were established at strategic locations around the coast, often just a few miles apart, where sailing vessels were known to have been driven ashore in poor conditions. The lifeboats would usually be 'Pulling and Sailing' (P&S) lifeboats, equipped with both oars and sails.

With increasing numbers of motor-powered vessels, the number of shipwrecks declined rapidly. Motor-powered lifeboats were introduced in the early 1900s, which could then cover larger distances in shorter times. Inevitably, the number of lifeboat stations required also declined, and many stations closed. In some places, a well constructed lifeboat house still stands, but in others, no evidence remains.

This is a list of former RNIPLS and RNLI stations, primarily those where the RNLI has now ceased operations from that particular location, town or village. Some RNLI sites, where the station is still in operation, but not necessarily at the original location, are included in the List of RNLI stations.

In a handful of locations, an Independent lifeboat service has been re-established, some using the original RNLI boathouse. Details can be found here:–

- Independent lifeboats in Britain and Ireland

== Regions ==
The information is correct with reference to the Lifeboat Enthusiasts Handbook 2026 unless noted otherwise, and is set out like the RNLI's divisional model. As far as possible it follows a clockwise route around the coast.

- North and East Region (North East and East England)
- South East Region (South and South East England)
- South West Region (South West England and the Channel Islands)
- Wales and West Region: (Wales, North West England and the Isle of Man)
- Scotland Region (Scotland)
- Ireland Region (Republic of Ireland and Northern Ireland)

== List of stations by Region ==
=== North & East Region ===
Station	Location	Dates	Comments	Photo
Holy Island	Holy Island, Northumberland	1803–1968	Only one of four former boathouses survives, the 1884 boathouse, currently used as a Lifeboat Museum.	
Bamburgh Castle	Bamburgh Castle, Northumberland	1882–1897	The Boat House, currently a holiday let	
Boulmer	Boulmer, Northumberland	1825–1968	Now home to Boulmer Volunteer Rescue Service.	
Alnmouth	Alnmouth, Northumberland	1854–1935	2024, Alnmouth Community Rowing Club.	
Hauxley	Hauxley, Northumberland	1853–1939	Private residence	
Cresswell	Cresswell, Northumberland	1875–1944	Now Cresswell Village Hall	
Whitburn	Whitburn, Tyne and Wear	1818–1918	Now the site of Whitburn Angling Club. No evidence remains.	
Hendon Beach	Sunderland, Tyne and Wear	1902–1912	No evidence remains	
Seaham	Seaham, County Durham	1855–1979	1870 boathouse now forms part of the East Durham Heritage and Lifeboat Museum. Remains of the 1909 boathouse and slipway are still visible.	
Crimdon Dene	Crimdon Dene, County Durham	1966–1993	ILB Station	
West Hartlepool	Hartlepool, County Durham	1847–1906	No evidence remains	
Seaton Carew	Seaton Carew, County Durham	1824–1922	No evidence remains	
Seaton Snook	Seaton Carew, County Durham	1907–1909	No evidence remains	
Middlesbrough	Middlesbrough, Borough of Middlesbrough	1854–1895	Boathouse demolished by 1913. No evidence remains.	
Teesmouth	South Gare, North Yorkshire	1911–2006	Station demolished after 2006. Little or no evidence remains.	
Saltburn	Saltburn, Redcar and Cleveland	1919–1922	Station building demolished before 1927. No evidence remains.	
Runswick	Runswick Bay, North Yorkshire	1866–1978	Tractor store used by Runswick Bay Rescue Boat since 1982.	
Upgang	Whitby, North Yorkshire	1865–1919	No evidence remains	
Robin Hood's Bay	Robin Hood's Bay, North Yorkshire	1881–1931	Boathouse now a shelter and public toilets. A replica service board is on the wall.	
Barmston	Barmston, East Riding of Yorkshire	1884–1898	Boathouse demolished, but some foundations may remain.	
Hornsea	Hornsea, East Riding of Yorkshire	1852–1924	Now a private residence. The Independent Hornsea Inshore Rescue was established in 1994.	
Easington	Easington, East Riding of Yorkshire	1913–1933	No evidence remains	
Grimsby	Grimsby, North East Lincolnshire	1882–1927	No evidence remains	
Humber Mouth	Humberston, North East Lincolnshire	1965–1980	ILB Station.	
Donna Nook	Donna Nook, Lincolnshire	1829–1931	Located at the site of what became RAF Donna Nook. No evidence remains.	
Theddlethorpe	Theddlethorpe, Lincolnshire	1828–1882	Theddlethorpe closed in 1882 due to difficulties launching and lack of crew. No evidence remains.	
Sutton	Sutton, Lincolnshire	1864–1913	Meridale Centre	
Chapel	Chapel St Leonards, Lincolnshire	1870–1898	Building remains, currently a boutique store.	
Gibraltar Point	Gibraltar Point, Lincolnshire	1825–1830	Transferred to Lincs. Coast Shipwreck Assoc. in 1827. No evidence remains.	
Brancaster	Brancaster, Norfolk	1874–1935	No evidence remains on site. Service board hangs in St Mary's Church, Brancaster.	
Blakeney	Blakeney, Norfolk	1862–1935	National Trust - Blakeney National Nature Reserve.	
Mundesley	Mundesley, Norfolk	1811–1895	Former station now a private house. Independent station operated since 1972 by Mundesley Volunteer Inshore Lifeboat.	
Bacton	Bacton, Norfolk	1822–1882	No evidence remains, believed lost by coastal erosion.	
Palling	Palling, Norfolk	1852–1930	No evidence of Old Lifeboat Station. Independent lifeboat operated since 1972 by Sea Palling Independent Rescue.	
Winterton	Winterton, Norfolk	1823–1925	Just the building foundations remain	
Caister	Caister, Norfolk	1845–1969	Station now run by Caister Volunteer Lifeboat Service.	
Corton	Corton, Suffolk	1869–1879	No evidence remains	
South Broads	Oulton Broad, Suffolk	2001–2011	ILB Station	
Pakefield	Pakefield, Suffolk	1840–1922	Nothing remains of three previous boathouses, some believed lost by coastal erosion.	
Kessingland	Kessingland, Suffolk	1867–1936	Very modified private residence	
Dunwich	Dunwich, Suffolk	1873–1903	Boathouse site lost to coastal erosion	
Thorpeness	Thorpeness, Suffolk	1853–1900	No evidence remains	
Orford	Orford, Suffolk	1826–1835		
Woodbridge Haven	Shingle Street, Suffolk	1826–1853		

=== South East Region ===
Station	Location	Dates	Comments	Photo
Chiswick	Chiswick, London	2002–2026	Operations transferred to Wandsworth Riverside.	
Kingsgate	Kingsgate, Kent	1862–1897	No evidence remains	
Broadstairs	Broadstairs, Kent	1868–1912	Harbour Office and Gift Shop	
North Deal	North Deal, Kent	1865–1932	Deal Angling Club	
Kingsdown	Kingsdown, Kent	1866–1927	Now a private residence	
Folkestone	Folkestone, Kent	1893–1930	Lifeboat house demolished after 1936. No evidence remains. Site recently redeveloped.	
Hythe, Sandgate & Folkestone	Seabrook, Kent	1876–1893	Lifeboat house demolished in 1956. No evidence remains.	
Hythe	Hythe, Kent	1893–1940	Two boathouses still remain, one located behind the second.	
Dymchurch	Dymchurch, Kent	1826–1838	Was located at Martello Tower No.27 at Dymchurch, but named 'Dungeness No.27 Tower' Lifeboat Station until 1836. Station closed in 1838. Tower No.27 demolished in 1841. Pic - Martello Tower No.25	
New Romney	New Romney, Kent	1871–1928	Boathouse demolished to extend Marine Parade into Coast Road.	
Rye	Camber Sands, East Sussex	1857–1901	Named Camber Lifeboat Station until 1862. No evidence remains.	
Winchelsea	Winchelsea, East Sussex	1856–1910	Named Rye Lifeboat Station until 1862. Renamed Rye Harbour in 1910.	
Worthing	Worthing, West Sussex	1964–1967	Private residence: 107 Marine Parade.	
Chichester Harbour	West Wittering, West Sussex	1867–1884	No evidence remains	
Southsea	Southsea, Portsmouth	1886–1918	Formerly on the promenade at Southsea Common; no evidence remains.	
Ryde	Ryde, Isle of Wight	1894–1923	Boathouse located on the Pier; no evidence remains.	
Atherfield	Atherfield, Isle of Wight	1890–1915	No evidence of boathouse remains, but the 1:3 steep slipway down the cliff may still be visible.	
Brighstone Grange	Brighstone Grange, Isle of Wight	1860–1915	Now a site for static caravans; little evidence remains.	
Brooke	Brook, Isle of Wight	1860–1937	Derelict ruin	
Totland Bay	Totland Bay, Isle of Wight	1885–1924	Community Hall?	
Bournemouth	Bournemouth, Dorset	1965–1972	ILB Station, still remains underneath Pier.	
Studland	Studland, Dorset	1826–1848	No evidence remains	
Chapman's Pool	Chapman's Pool, Dorset	1866–1880	Two refurbished boathouses stand on the site of the lifeboat station. It is not clear which one may have been constructed from the old lifeboat house.	
Kimmeridge	Kimmeridge, Dorset	1868–1896	No evidence remains	

=== South West Region ===
Station	Location	Dates	Comments	Photo
Portland	Isle of Portland, Dorset	1826–1851		
St Sampson	St Sampson, Guernsey	1803–1878; (1880–1881)	Former boathouse still exists, at North Side Street/ Trafalgar Road junction.	
La Lande	Beaucette Marina, Guernsey	1878–1880	Little if anything remains of the boathouse, which was located just to the north of what is now Beaucette Marina.	
Sidmouth	Sidmouth, Devon	1869–1912	A doorway arch marked RNLBI is all that remains of the old station. It is located across the road from the Independent Sidmouth Lifeboat, established in 1968.	
Torquay	Beacon Cove, Torquay, Devon	1876–1928	No evidence remains.	
Hope Cove	Hope Cove, Devon	1878–1930	Under refurbishment	
Yealm River	Newton Ferrers, Devon	1878–1927	Private residence.	
Polkerris	Polkerris, Cornwall	1859–1922	Moved to Fowey where it was easier to find a crew. The boathouse is now a café.	
Mevagissey	Mevagissey, Cornwall	1869–1930	The lifeboat was based in the village of Portmellon until 1888 when it was moved to Mevagissey. The Portmellon boathouse is now a private residence, and the slipway is still visible. The boathouse at Mevagissey is now an aquarium.	
Portloe	Portloe, Cornwall	1870–1887	A boathouse built in 1870 is now a church. A second boathouse built in 1877 is now a private residence.	
Porthoustock	Porthoustock, Cornwall	1869–1942	Now used as a village hall.	
Coverack	Coverack, Cornwall	1901–1980	The 1901 boathouse is now a Fish & Chip restaurant.	
Mullion	Mullion Cove, Cornwall	1867–1908	Private residence.	
Porthleven	Porthleven, Cornwall	1863–1929	Building later used as a shipwreck museum. Now an art studio.	
Marazion	St Michael's Mount, Cornwall	1990–2001	ILB Station.	
Penzance	Penzance, Cornwall	1803–1917	Station closed between 1812–1826 and again 1828-1851. A boathouse built in 1884 still stands.	
St Agnes, IOS	St Agnes, Isles of Scilly	1890–1920	Boathouse now used as a store.	
Hayle	Hayle, Cornwall	1866–1920	Now a builders yard, no evidence remains.	
Morthoe	Morte Bay, Woolacombe, Devon	1871–1900	An outstation from Ilfracombe. The boathouse is now a beach café / surf hire shop.	
Lynmouth	Lynmouth, Devon	1869–1944	Destroyed in the Lynmouth flood of 1952 but rebuilt and is now the Flood Memorial Hall.	
Watchet	Watchet, Somerset	1875–1944	Now Watchet Community Library.	
Pill	Pill, Somerset	1971–1974	Boat moored afloat, with crew facilities provided at the Cruising Clubhouse in Pill.	

=== Wales, West & Isle of Man Region ===
Station	Location	Dates	Comments	Photo
Atlantic College	Atlantic College, Vale of Glamorgan	1963–2013	Continues training and building boats	
Llanelli	Llanelli, Carmarthenshire	1869–1871	Lifeboat stored on davits, on the Llanelli Pilot / Lightship.	
Pembrey	Pembrey Burrows, Carmarthenshire	1863–1887	Sand forced closure; lifeboat station moved to Burry Port. No evidence remains.	
Ferryside	Ferryside, Carmarthenshire	1835–1960	Formerly Carmarthen, and Carmarthen Bay Lifeboat Station until ~1892; Independent lifeboat service since 1966, Ferryside Lifeboat	
Carmarthen	Laugharne, Carmarthenshire	1835–1843	Exact location unknown	
Solva	Solva, Pembrokeshire	1869–1887	Station dedicated 1869.	
Newport	Newport, Pembrokeshire	1884–1894	Former boathouse is now a private residence.	
Llanaelhaearn	Llanaelhaearn, Gwynedd	1883–1901	Located at Trefor Pier.	
Llanddwyn	Ynys Llanddwyn, Anglesey	1826–1907	Now a Boathouse / Store	
Rhosneigr	Rhosneigr, Anglesey	1872–1924	Boathouse / Store	
Rhoscolyn	Rhoscolyn, Anglesey	1830–1929	Two former lifeboat houses remain, 1877 (private dwelling), 1903 (holiday let).	
Porth Ruffydd	Holy Island, Anglesey	1891–1904	The steps, and some rubble, are all that remains of the former lifeboat station.	
Cemlyn	Cemlyn, Anglesey	1877–1919	Derelict, some foundations and slipway survive.	
Cemaes	Porth yr Ogof, Cemaes, Anglesey	1872–1932	Derelict, some foundations and slipway survive.	
Bull Bay	Bull Bay, Anglesey	1868–1926	Former boathouse is now a Community Hub.	
Penmon	Penmon, Anglesey	1831–1915	Former boathouse is now a holiday let.	
Llanddulas	Llanddulas, Conwy	1869–1932	Former boathouse is now a private residence.	
Point of Air	Gronant, Flintshire	1826–1894	Former coxswains residence still exists at Presthaven Holiday Park.	
Point of Ayr	Talacre, Flintshire	1894–1923	No evidence remains	
Mostyn	Mostyn, Flintshire	1835–1850	No evidence remains	
Castletown	Castletown, Isle of Man	1856–1922	Former boathouse is now a private residence.	
Formby	Formby, Metropolitan Borough of Sefton	1894–1919	Some foundations still visible in shifting sand.	
Southport	Southport, Metropolitan Borough of Sefton	1860–1925, 1988–2022	Building pictured built in 1886 and closed in 1925. Reopened by Southport Offshore Rescue Trust from 1988–2022. Currently used as storage by Sefton Council.	
Lytham	Lytham, Lancashire	1851–1931	Lifeboat Museum	
St Annes	St Annes, Lancashire	1881–1925	Former boathouse is now a funeral directors.	
Seascale	Seascale, Cumbria	1875–1895	Site is now part of a car park. No evidence remains.	
Whitehaven	Whitehaven, Cumbria	1865–1924	Demolished; now Whitehaven Marina Yard. No evidence remains.	
Maryport	Maryport, Cumbria	1865–1949	RNLI Boathouse now in use by independent Maryport Rescue.	

=== Scotland Region ===
Station	Location	Dates	Comments	Photo
Balcary	Auchencairn, Dumfries and Galloway	1884–1931	Private residence	
Isle of Whithorn	Isle of Whithorn, Dumfries and Galloway	1869–1919	Ruin	
Port Logan	Port Logan, Dumfries and Galloway	1866–1932	Village Hall.	
Ballantrae	Ballantrae, South Ayrshire	1871–1919	Boat House / store.	
Ayr	Ayr, South Ayrshire	1859–1932	Seafood restaurant (Closed).	
Irvine	Irvine, North Ayrshire	1860–1914	Demolished; now a car park.	
Ardrossan	Ardrossan, North Ayrshire	1869–1930	Was located on the West Pier, near the lighthouse, demolished.	
Southend (Cantyre)	Southend, Argyll and Bute	1869–1930	Currently a Holiday let.	
Machrihanish	Machrihanish, Argyll and Bute	1912–1930	Boathouse / store.	
Kildonan	Kildonan, Arran	1870–1901	Boathouse still standing, part of a hotel.	
Leverburgh	Leverburgh, Outer Hebrides	2012–2025	Station closed 2025, due to lack of available volunteers.	
Stronsay	Whitehall, Stronsay, Orkney	1952–1972	1911 Lifeboat house dismantled in 1949, only the slipway remains. A building used as a station from the 1950s, now Cardinham House, remains.	
Huna	Huna, Caithness	1877–1930	Semi-derelict store.	
Ackergill	Ackergill, Caithness	1878–1932	Boathouse / store, and separate slipway still exist.	
Dornoch Firth and Embo	Embo, Sutherland, Highland	1886–1904	No evidence found.	
Cromarty	Cromarty, Highland	1911–1968	Demolished?	
Nairn	Nairn, Highland	1878–1911	Lifeboat House demolished to make way for the harbour extension in 1930s.	
Lossiemouth	Lossiemouth, Moray	1859–1923	Marine engineers workshop	
Whitehills	Whitehills, Aberdeenshire	1924–1969	Private residence.	
Banff and Macduff	Banff, Aberdeenshire	1921–1924	1860 boathouse demolished in 1877. 1877 boathouse is now private residence.	
Whitelink Bay	St Combs, Aberdeenshire	1878–1905	A memorial can be found on the 18th hole of Inverallochy Golf Course where the boathouse once stood.	
Port Erroll	Cruden Bay, Aberdeenshire	1915–1921	Believed converted to public toilets.	
Newburgh	Newburgh, Aberdeenshire	1877–1965	Boathouse / Store.	
Gourdon	Gourdon, Aberdeenshire	1878–1969	Private residence on William Street.	
Johnshaven	Johnshaven, Aberdeenshire	1891–1928	Johnshaven Heritage Hub Museum	
Buddon Ness	Monifieth, Angus	1867–1894	No evidence remains	
St Andrews	St Andrews, Fife	1860–1938	St Andrews Sailing Club	
Crail	Crail, Fife	1884–1923	Crail Golf Course Store	
Buckhaven	Buckhaven, Fife	1900–1932	Derelict lifeboat house demolished in 1950s; harbour filled in.	
Skateraw	Skateraw, East Lothian	1907–1943	Demolished	
St Abbs	St Abbs, Scottish Borders	1911–2015	In operation but as an independent lifeboat station. St Abbs Lifeboat	

=== Ireland Region ===
Station	Location	Dates	Comments	Photo
Carrickfergus	Carrickfergus, County Antrim	1896–1913	Boathouse was constructed alongside the pier. Only the pilings now remain.	
Groomsport	Groomsport, County Down	1858–1920	Community hall	
Ballywalter	Ballywalter, County Down	1866–1906	Boat House / Store.	
Cloughey-Portavogie	Portavogie, County Down	1965–1981	Lifeboat was moored afloat at Portavogie harbour.	
Cloughey	Cloughey, County Down	1888–1965	Private residence.	
St John's Point	St. John's Point, County Down	1835–1843	Unknown location	
Rossglass	Rossglass, Killough, County Down	1825–1835	Unknown location	
Killough	Rossglass, Killough, County Down	1901–1914	Now believed to be a private residence	
Tyrella	Tyrella, County Down	1860–1899	Derelict building	
Greenore	Greenore, County Louth	1894–1920	Vacant building	
Giles Quay	Gyles' Quay, County Louth	1879–1912	Private residence	
Blackrock	Blackrock, County Louth	1880–1935	Building still there	
Drogheda No.1	Baltray, County Louth	1856–1899	No evidence remains	
Drogheda No.2	Mornington, County Meath	1872–1926	Derelict for many years, converted to a private residence in 2007.	
Balbriggan	Balbriggan, County Dublin	1875–1898	Lifeboat house constructed underneath the railway arch. In 2026, the building is under refurbishment.	
Rogerstown	Rogerstown Estuary, Dublin	1874–1882	Believed demolished	
Poolbeg	Poolbeg, Dublin	1862–1959	Was at the small harbour west of Poolbeg disused power station. No evidence remains.	
Greystones	Greystones, County Wicklow	1872–1895	Retail unit / Ice Cream shop	
Cahore	Ballygarrett, County Wexford	1857–1916	Store, located next to Cahore Independent Lifeboat house	
Carnsore	Carne, County Wexford	1859–1897	Private residence	
Duncannon	Duncannon, County Wexford	1869–1886	Boathouse / store at Duncannon pier	
Ardmore	Ardmore, County Waterford	1858–1895	Private residence	
Queenstown	Cobh, County Cork	1866–1920	Cobh Sea Scout HQ	
Derrynane	Derrynane, County Kerry	1844–1855	Boathouse believed to be white building next to Derrynane Beach Car Park	
Westport	Inishlyre, County Mayo	1857–1862	Boathouse / Store	
Killybegs	Killybegs, County Donegal	1941–1945	Wartime station, lifeboat was moored afloat	
Culdaff	Culdaff, County Donegal	1892–1913	Boathouse / store	
Greencastle	Port Blaney, Greencastle, County Donegal	1864–1928	Private residence	

== See also ==
- List of RNLI stations
- Independent lifeboats in Britain and Ireland
