= Portloe Lifeboat Station =

Former RNLI lifeboat station in Cornwall, England

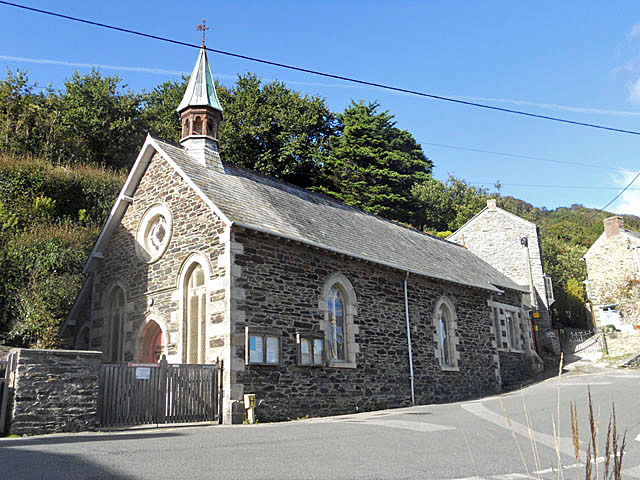
- 1870 Lifeboat House, Portloe

- Location within Cornwall

General information
- Status: Closed
- Type: RNLI Lifeboat Station
- Location: All Saints Church, Portloe, Cornwall, TR2 5QX, England
- Coordinates: 50°13′07.4″N 4°53′33.9″W
- Opened: 4 October 1870
- Closed: 1887

Portloe Lifeboat Station was located in the small village of Portloe, which sits on the Roseland Peninsula, approximately 10 miles (16 km) south east of Truro, overlooking Veryan Bay, on the south east coast of Cornwall.

A lifeboat was first placed at Portloe in 1870, by the Royal National Lifeboat Institution (RNLI).

After just 17 years of operation, Porthleven lifeboat station was closed in 1887.

== History ==
In September 1870, a 33-foot (10 m) self-righting 'Pulling and Sailing' (P&S) lifeboat, one with sails and (10) oars, along with its transporting carriage, was forwarded to the new lifeboat station at Portloe in Cornwall. There had been local support for the formation of a crew, and the Inspector of Lifeboats had joined the recommendation that a lifeboat be placed at Portloe, "it being thought a good intermediate position between the Falmouth and Mevagissey Life-boat Stations, which are some twenty miles apart."

The lifeboat was transported free of charge to the Grampound Road railway station by the Bristol and Exeter, South Devon and Cornwall railway companies. From there, local farmers granted free use of their horses, to transport the lifeboat on its carriage the 10 miles (16 km) to the newly constructed boathouse in Portloe, receiving great welcome in all the villages on the way.

The following day, 4 October 1870, in front of a large crowd, a naming ceremony was held, and the lifeboat was named Gorfenkle, in accordance with the wishes of the late Jacob Gorfenkle, a Polish sponge merchant of Brownlow Hill, Liverpool, who had bequeathed the amount of £500 for the provision of a lifeboat. The lifeboat was then launched and tested, alongside the Mevagissey lifeboat South Warwickshire (ON 181), which had arrived to join the celebrations.

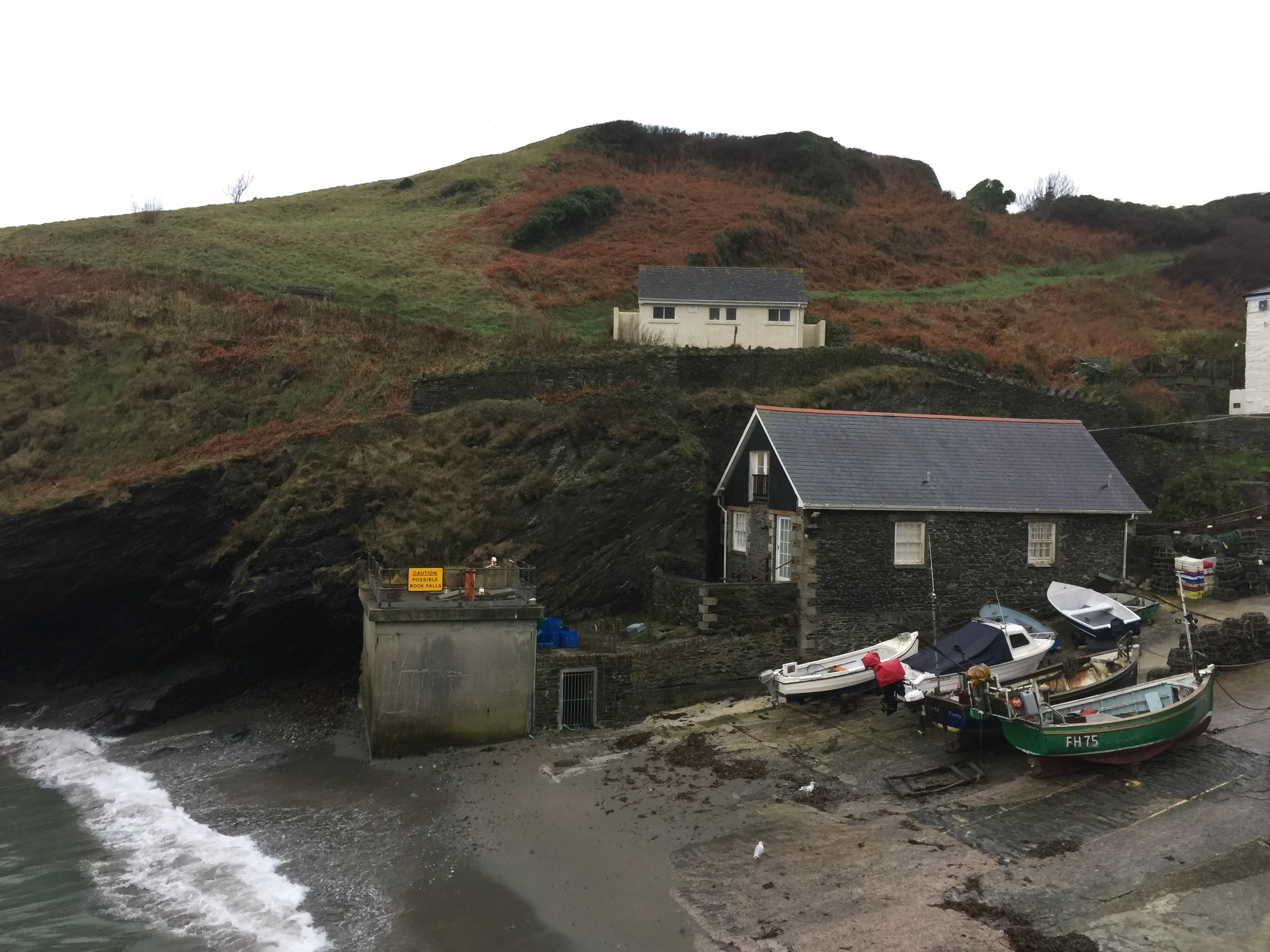
Portloe 1877 Lifeboat House

The original lifeboat house at Portloe was situated on the highest road in the village, and manhandling the lifeboat down to the shore was always a struggle. On one occasion, attempting to launch on exercise, the brake on the carriage failed, and the lifeboat ran away and smashed into a local shop. In 1877, a new boathouse was constructed next to the shore at Portloe Cove. The original boathouse was later sold, and converted in 1896 to become All Saints Church.

In 17 years on station, Portloe lifeboat was never launched on a rescue. At a meeting of the RNLI committee of management on Thursday 5 May 1887, it was decided that the lifeboat station at Portloe (Cornwall) be abolished.

The 1870 lifeboat house still exists, and is now a church. The 1877 lifeboat house also still exists, and is a private residence. The lifeboat on station at the time of closure, Gorfenkle, the only lifeboat to serve at Portloe, was sold from service six years later in 1893. No more details of the boat are known.

== Portloe lifeboat ==
ON (Note: ON is the RNLI's Official Number of the boat.)	Name	Built	On station	Class	Comments
Pre-544	Gorfenkle	1870	1870−1887	33-foot Self-righting (P&S)	(Note: 33-foot x 8-foot (10-oared) Peake-class self-righting (P&S) lifeboat, legacy of Mr J. Gorfenkle of Liverpool, built by Forrestt of Limehouse, London, costing £277-17s-6d.)

Pre ON numbers are unofficial numbers used by the Lifeboat Enthusiast Society to reference early lifeboats not included on the official RNLI list.

== See also ==
- List of RNLI stations
- List of former RNLI stations
- Independent lifeboats in Britain and Ireland
