= Westport Lifeboat Station =

Former RNLI lifeboat station in County Mayo, Ireland

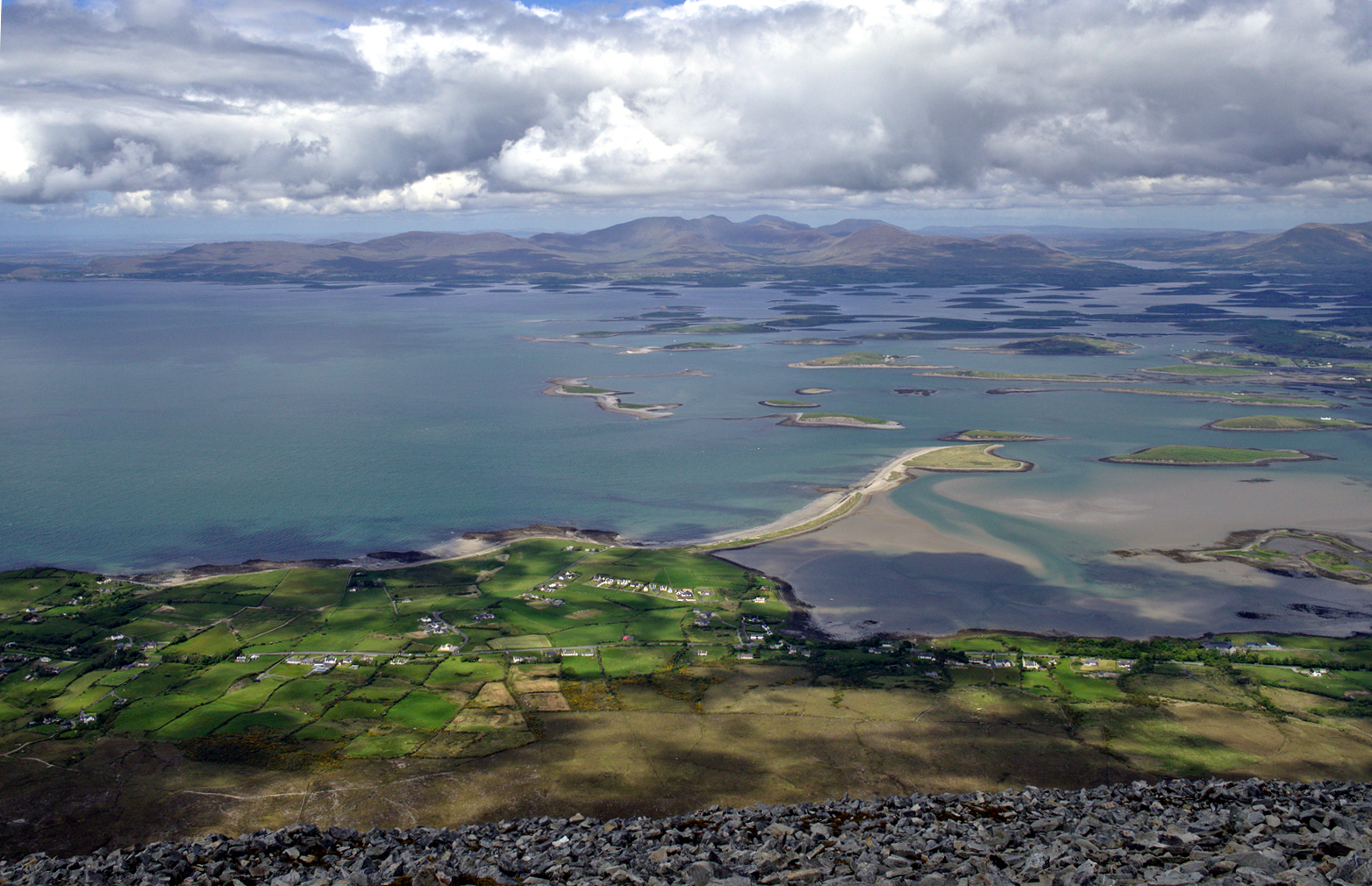
- The Islands of Clew Bay

- Inishlyre, County Mayo

General information
- Status: Closed
- Type: RNLI Lifeboat Station
- Location: Inishlyre, County Mayo, Ireland
- Coordinates: 53°49′25.3″N 9°39′01.0″W
- Opened: 1857
- Closed: 1862
- Owner: Inishlyre Harbour Commissioners

Westport Lifeboat Station was actually located approximately 5 nautical miles (9.3 km; 5.8 mi) west of Westport, on the island of Inishlyre, one of many islands in Clew Bay, County Mayo, on the west coast of Ireland.

A lifeboat station was first established at Inishlyre in 1857 by the Royal National Lifeboat Institution (RNLI).

After just 5 years in operation, Westport Lifeboat Station was closed in 1862.

== History ==
On 4 February 1832, the ship Huntley, loaded with a cargo of timer, sank in the Atlantic Ocean, 500 miles (800 km) west of Ireland. The Master and 14 crew took to the ship's boat, and after nine days, with few provisions, and no compass, the boat was washed up on Inishbofin, County Galway. The crew were in a terrible state, but nobody would go near them for fear of Cholera. Finally, Mr Henry Hildebrand, Baliff to Howe Browne, 2nd Marquess of Sligo, set an example, and got all brought ashore to safety, taking them to his house and offices to be fed and looked after. Ever since its founding in 1824, the Royal National Institution for the Preservation of Life from Shipwreck (RNIPLS), later to become the RNLI in 1854, would award medals for deeds of gallantry at sea, even if no lifeboats were involved. Henry Hildebrand was awarded the RNIPLS Silver Medal.

It would be 25 years later, when it was decided to place a lifeboat in the area. A new local committee formed by the Westport Harbour Commissioners, was created to manage the station. In 1857, a 28-foot Self-righting 'Pulling and Sailing' (P&S) lifeboat, one with sails and (10) oars, was dispatched to the new lifeboat station at Inishlyre, "where she will be readily available to proceed to the assistance of all vessels in the vicinity of the port.".

A new boathouse was constructed on the island, and the lifeboat transported free of charge from Liverpool to Westport, County Mayo by Mr Lever, proprietor of the Liverpool and Westport steamship line.

The lifeboat wasn't a new boat. She had previously been the first lifeboat to be stationed at Lytham in Lancashire in 1851. The land and a boathouse at Lytham were provided by local landowner John Talbot Clifton of Lytham Hall, and the lifeboat was duly named The Clifton.

The Clifton also had a tragic past. She capsized on exercise on 1 October 1852, and eight of the Lytham lifeboat crew were lost. The lifeboat didn't self-right, and it was later discovered that the crew had not understood the importance of the air boxes for self-righting capabilities, the boat being only the second self-righting lifeboat to be placed on service. Doors had been cut into the airtight boxes for storage, and the water ballast tanks had not been plugged, allowing the water to escape, thus cancelling any self-righting capability.

Following the transfer to Inishlyre, no records have been found of any further activity, service or rescue at the station. Other than detail from RNLI records giving the dates of operation, via the Lifeboat Enthusiasts Society handbook, there are also no details available about the closure, or the reasons. Westport Lifeboat Station was closed after just 5 years, in 1862.

The lifeboat house still stands next to the small jetty at Inishlyre. The Clifton lifeboat was withdrawn, and sold from service the same year. No further information of the boat is known.

== Station honours ==
The following are awards made at Westport.

- RNIPLS Silver Medal

Henry Hildebrand, Baliff – 1832
(Reported lost, a replacement medal was issued in 1850)

== Westport lifeboat ==
ON (Note: ON is the RNLI's Official Number of the boat.)	Name	Built	On station	Class	Comments
Pre-239	The Clifton	1851	1857–1862	28-foot 3in Peake Self-righting (P&S)	(Note: 28-foot 3in x 7-foot (10-oared) self-righting (P&S) lifeboat, built by James Beeching of Great Yarmouth.)

Station Closed, 1862

Pre ON numbers are unofficial numbers used by the Lifeboat Enthusiast Society to reference early lifeboats not included on the official RNLI list.

== See also ==
- List of RNLI stations
- List of former RNLI stations
- Royal National Lifeboat Institution lifeboats
