= Porth Ruffydd Lifeboat Station =

Former RNLI lifeboat station in Anglesey, Wales

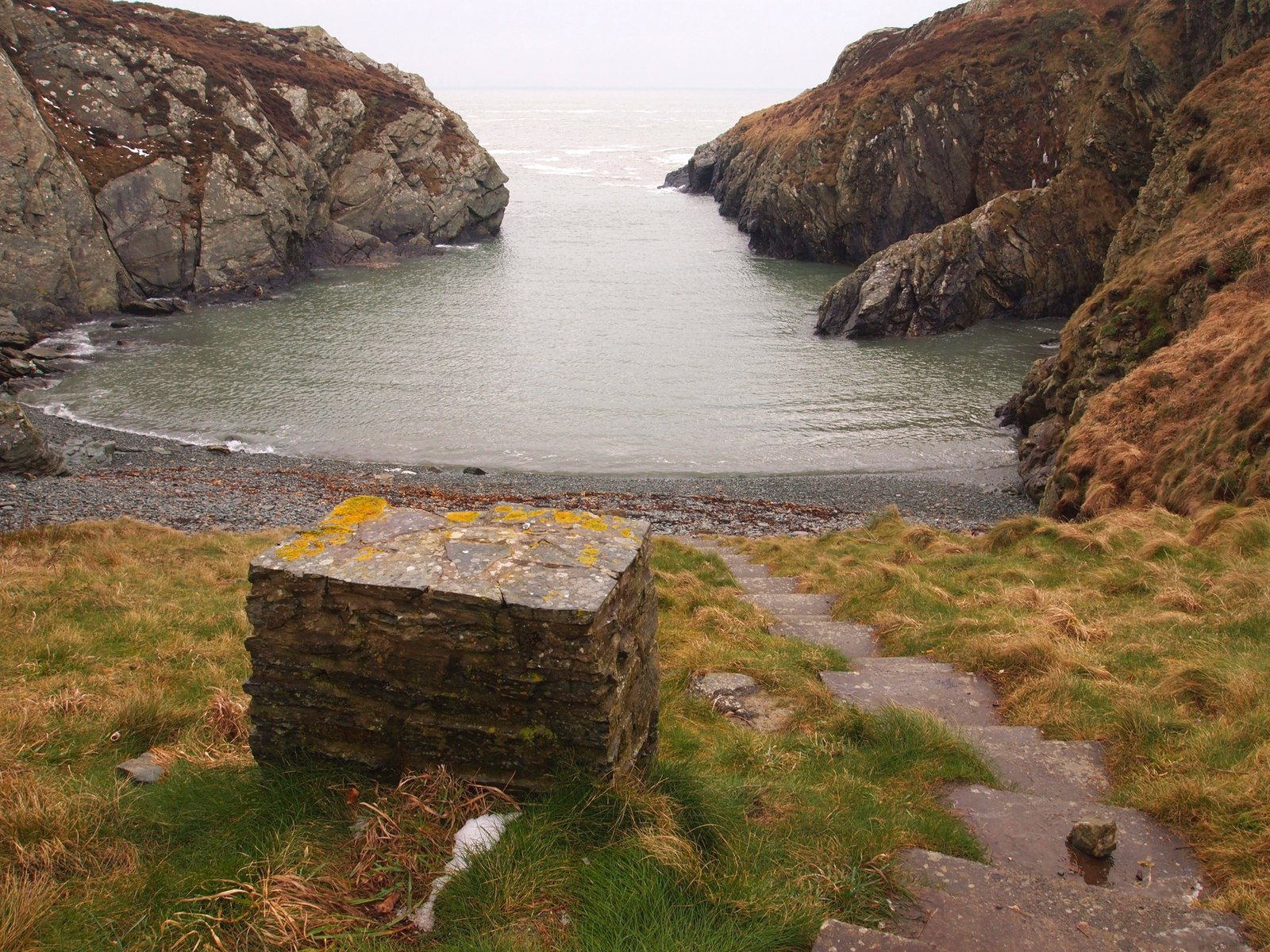
- Cove at Porth Ruffydd, Anglesey

- Porth Ruffydd, Anglesey

General information
- Status: Closed
- Type: RNLI Lifeboat Station
- Location: Porth Ruffydd, Holyhead, Anglesey, LL65 2LT, Wales
- Coordinates: 53°17′09.5″N 4°40′32.3″W
- Opened: 1891
- Closed: 1904

Porth Ruffydd Lifeboat Station was located at Porth Ruffydd, to the south of Penrhos Point, on the south-west coast of Holy Island, 3 miles (4.8 km) to the south-west of the Port of Holyhead, in the north-east of the Isle of Anglesey, Wales.

A lifeboat station was established at Porth Ruffydd by the Royal National Lifeboat Institution (RNLI) in 1891.

After 14 service launches, but with no lives saved, Porth Ruffydd Lifeboat Station was closed in 1904.

The location is known as "Porth Ruffydd". Please note that in virtually all RNLI references and documents, the name of the station is listed as "Porth Rhuffydd".

== History ==
In poor conditions on 17 December 1889, the Barque Tenby Castle ran aground on rocks at Penrhos Point, on the western side of Holy Island. The Volunteer Life Brigade was dispatched to travel 3 miles (4.8 km) overland from Holyhead. The Holyhead lifeboat was launched, but would need to travel the 6 miles (9.7 km) or more around the north of Holy Island. On arrival on scene, the brigade were unable to reach the vessel. John O. Williams, Chief Officer of HM Coastguard, and Holyhead lifeboat Honorary Secretary, sent a man to raise the Rhoscolyn lifeboat as well.

The brigade did manage to save three men, after several trips with the use of a small boat. By the time the Holyhead lifeboat arrived, the vessel had sunk. They picked up one further man, but he later died. In all, 11 of the 14 crew of the Tenby Castle were lost. Five of the brigade would receive the RNLI Silver Medal for their brave efforts.

At a meeting of the RNLI committee of management on Thursday 9 January 1890, as requested by the Holyhead branch, it was decided to establish a lifeboat station at nearby Porth Ruffydd.

A boathouse, reported to be the finest on that coast, was constructed at the head of the small cove at Porth Ruffydd, at a cost of £1,320. The station was to be managed by the Holyhead branch of the RNLI, and should the boat be required, many of the crew would be brought over from Holyhead.

The cost of the lifeboat and equipment was funded via the Manchester branch of the RNLI, from the Norbury Lifeboat Fund, a special fund set up by Mr and Mrs Norbury of Bowden, Altrincham. They raised monies by means of collections, sales of work, dramatic and musical events, and in this case, had also received an anonymous gift of £700. With their connections in the Isle of Man, where they had a second residence at Port Lewaigue, the couple had previously made considerable donations to fund both the lifeboat and boathouse at Ramsey.

A 34-foot self-righting 'Pulling and Sailing' (P&S) lifeboat, one with sails and (10) oars, costing £436, was ordered from Watkins & Co., and despatched to Holyhead, where a naming ceremony was held on 6 August 1891. Mrs Norbury named the lifeboat Norbury (ON 297), after which the boat was lowered into the water by crane. With all equipment fastened down, the boat was twice turned over, self-righting immediately both times. The crew then went aboard, and the boat was sailed to her new station at Porth Ruffydd.

The Porth Ruffydd lifeboat was first called on the 19 November 1893, to the steamship SS Theresa, but it turned out the lifeboat was not required. On 12 October 1894, the lifeboat was called to aid the Norwegian vessel Eugenie aground on Ramon Rocks, and after some assistance, the vessel was refloated.

With few service calls, and now with a steam-powered lifeboat based at Holyhead, which was able to cover the distance far quicker than before, it was decided to close the Porth Ruffydd Lifeboat Station in 1904.

The Norbury (ON 297), the only lifeboat to serve at Porth Ruffydd, was broken up. The boathouse survived until 1997, when it was demolished. Only the steps down to the old station remain, as pictured.

== Station honours ==
The following are awards made at Porth Ruffydd.

- RNLI Silver Medal

John O. Williams, Chief Officer, H.M. Coastguard, Holyhead, Hon. Secretary – 1890 (Second-Service clasp)
William Owen, Pilot – 1890
George Jones, Boatman – 1890
John Roberts, Farmer and Fisherman – 1890
John Morris, Farmer – 1890

== Porth Ruffydd lifeboat ==
ON (Note: ON is the RNLI's Official Number of the boat.)	Name	Built	On Station	Class	Comments
297	Norbury	1890	1891–1904	34-foot Self-righting (P&S)	(Note: 34-foot x 7-foot 6in (10-oared) self-righting (P&S) lifeboat, built by Watkins & Co., costing £436.)

Station Closed, 1904

== See also ==
- List of RNLI stations
- List of former RNLI stations
- Royal National Lifeboat Institution lifeboats
