= Robin Hood's Bay Lifeboat Station =

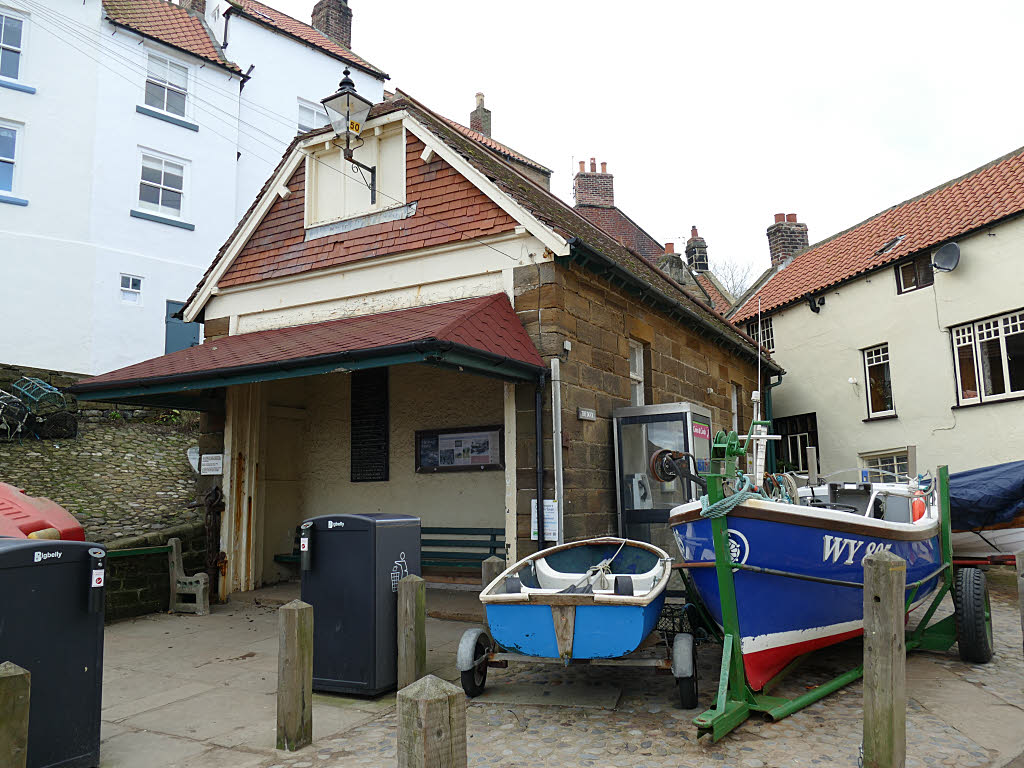
- Former lifeboat station, Robin Hood's Bay

General information
- Type: RNLI Lifeboat Station
- Location: Robin Hood's Bay, North Yorkshire
- Country: England
- Coordinates: 54.430°N 0.532°W
- Opened: 1881
- Closed: 1931

Robin Hood's Bay Lifeboat Station was a Royal National Lifeboat Institution (RNLI) lifeboat station, situated at Robin Hood's Bay, on the coast of North Yorkshire, England. The lifeboat station had been operating for just over 100 years intermittently when it was closed by the RNLI in 1931. The withdrawal of the lifeboat capability from Robin Hood's Bay was due to the Whitby lifeboat being able to be launched from Whitby, and into the bay at Robin Hood's Bay, before the bay lifeboat itself could be manhandled into the sea.

== History ==
The first boat to be used as a lifeboat at Robin Hood's Bay was a coble converted into a lifeboat by the boatbuilder Harton of Limehouse in London. Ships were often wrecked in the bay; some have stated that this is down to the ironstone in the reef which extends out to sea from Ravenscar. The iron was thought to have affected ships compasses, though this has never been proven. The announcement of a new lifeboat and lifeboat station for Robin Hood's Bay was made in October 1839, and this was used for 16 years before falling into disuse in 1855. A ship named Emporium was wrecked off the coast between Robin Hood's Bay and Whitby, with a newspaper report stating their regret that the lifeboat hadn't been launched. It stated that an RNLI inspector had visited not long before the wreck, and he had said the boat was good, but the gear was not in order.

In 1843, six of the lifeboat crew died when they launched in a storm to the rescue of a brig (the William and Ann), in distress in the bay. They successfully helped the crew into the lifeboat when a hug wave capsized the boat. All lifeboatmen and crew of the brig drowned. Although listed as ineffective or disused, the lifeboat at Robin Hood's Bay was mentioned in Hansard from 1874, stating that it was 7 miles (11 km) south-east of Whitby, and some 8 miles (13 km) north-east of Scarborough, the two next nearest lifeboat stations.

The revival of a lifeboat, and the building of a new lifeboat station in 1881, was due to the efforts needed to get to the brig Visiter (or Visitor), which had become stranded in a storm in the bay off Robin Hood's Bay in January 1881. The old lifeboat within Robin Hood's Bay was not seaworthy, and an approach by sea from one of the Whitby lifeboats proved useless. So the other Whitby lifeboat (the Robert Whitworth) was put on its carriage and taken the 8 miles (13 km) overland through 6 feet (1.8 m) snowdrifts to be launched form the slipway at Robin Hood's Bay, in a process that took over three hours.

In late 1881, the RNLI took over running the lifeboat, and they presented the station with a 32 feet (9.8 m) boat named the Ephraim and Hannah Fox, which initially only had one local volunteer (the rest of the men preferred to stay with the rocket brigade). A crew from Whitby made up the numbers on the lifeboat until such a time as all men on the boat were recruited locally. The lifeboat house was built to a standard design by the official RNLI architect, and was placed just inland from the main slipway into the sea at Robin Hood's Bay, on land donated by Sir Charles Strickland. The Ephraim and Hannah Fox served for 23 years, being replaced in 1903 by the Mary Ann Lockwood. The second boat served for 28 years and was launched 35 times, with records stating that her crews rescued 53 people during that period.

A rescue undertaken in 1908, resulted in the lifeboat being washed ashore by heavy seas, and all the oars being smashed by the swell. However, all the lifeboat crew and the crew of the Reperio were saved. Another rescue occurred in October 1919, when the Cap Palos, a five-masted schooner was stranded in the bay, and the lifeboat went out four times to rescue the crew. The heavy swell later washed the ship ashore, and she spent a year on the beach at Robin Hood's Bay before being refloated and towed to Whitby. (Note: The Cap Palos was repaired, but when she set sail from Whitby, she experienced a heavy south-westerly gale and returned to the Whitby Roads (an area of deep water just offshore from the mouth of the River Esk). However, she broke free from her mooring and drifted southwards with the Whitby lifeboat following for seven hours before a rescue could be effected. The Cap Palos lies in 50 feet (15 m) of water between Scarborough and Flamborough.)

The lifeboat station at Robin Hood's Bay was closed in 1931, as it was found that the Whitby lifeboat could in the bay before the Robin Hood's Bay lifeboat could be manhandled into the sea. The cobbled slipway at Robin Hood's Bay (known as Way Foot), is steep and the combined weight of the lifeboat and carriage was 7 tonnes (7.7 tons). This made launching the lifeboat very time-consuming. Another problem was during the winter storms, when it was almost impossible to get the lifeboat back safely, and the crew had to spend hours out at sea with those they had rescued before they could return. In all, only four boats had been used at Robin Hood's Bay between 1830 and 1931.

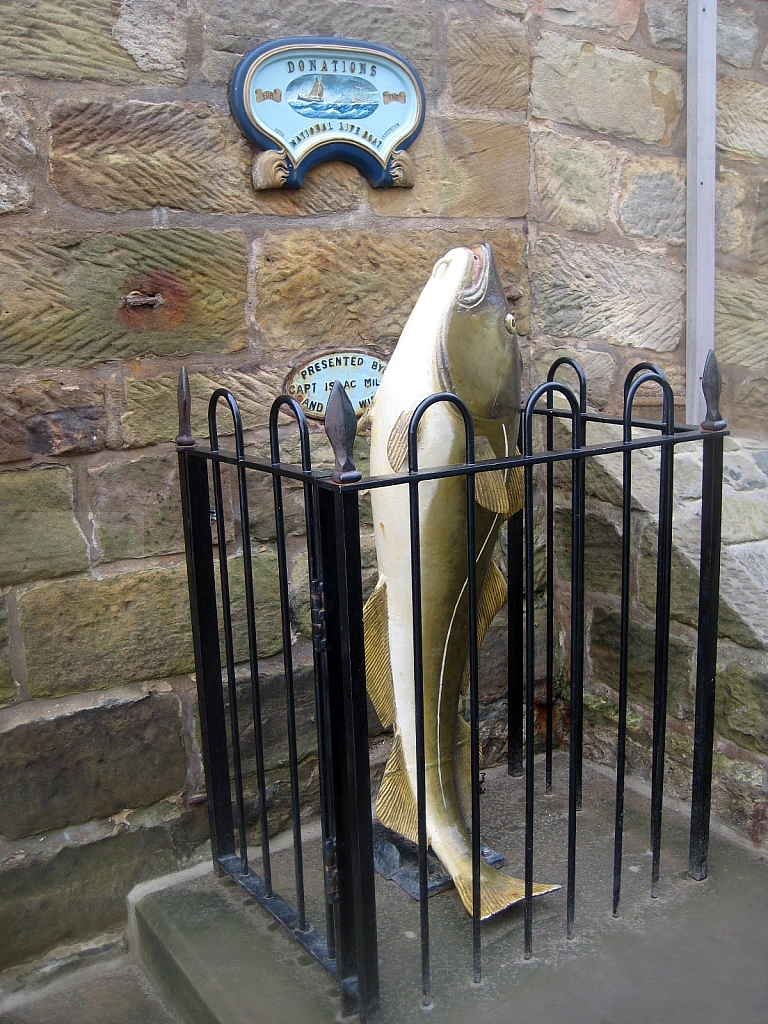
RNLI Collection Box

One of the boards commemorating rescues undertaken by the lifeboat crews between 1893 and 1929, is hung on the wall of the old parish church on the hill overlooking Fylingthorpe, Raw and Robin Hood's Bay. The lifeboat house building is now a shelter and public convenience.

At the top of the cobbled slip, just a few yards from the old boathouse, still stands a unique RNLI Coin Collection Box, in the shape of a (Cod) Fish, dating from 1887. It is listed on the National Heritage List for England as a grade II listed building, and meets the criteria for listing "as an example of Victorian public statuary and can be seen as a memorial to fishermen lost at sea and the bravery of RNLI volunteers."

== Robin Hood's Bay lifeboats ==
Dates in service	Class	ON (Note: ON is the RNLI's Official Number of the boat.)	Name	Comments
1881−1903	32-foot Self-righting (P&S)	234	Ephraim and Hannah Fox	Boat measured 32 feet (9.8 m) by 8 feet (2.4 m).
1903–1931	34-foot Self-righting (P&S)	499	Mary Ann Lockwood	Boat measured 34 feet (10 m) by 8.5 feet (2.6 m). On decommissioning from the RNLI, the boat was converted into a cabin cruiser at Smith and Son boatbuilders in Goole, for a private buyer.

== See also ==
- List of RNLI stations
- List of former RNLI stations
