= Balcary Lifeboat Station =

Former RNLI lifeboat station in Dumfries and Galloway, Scotland

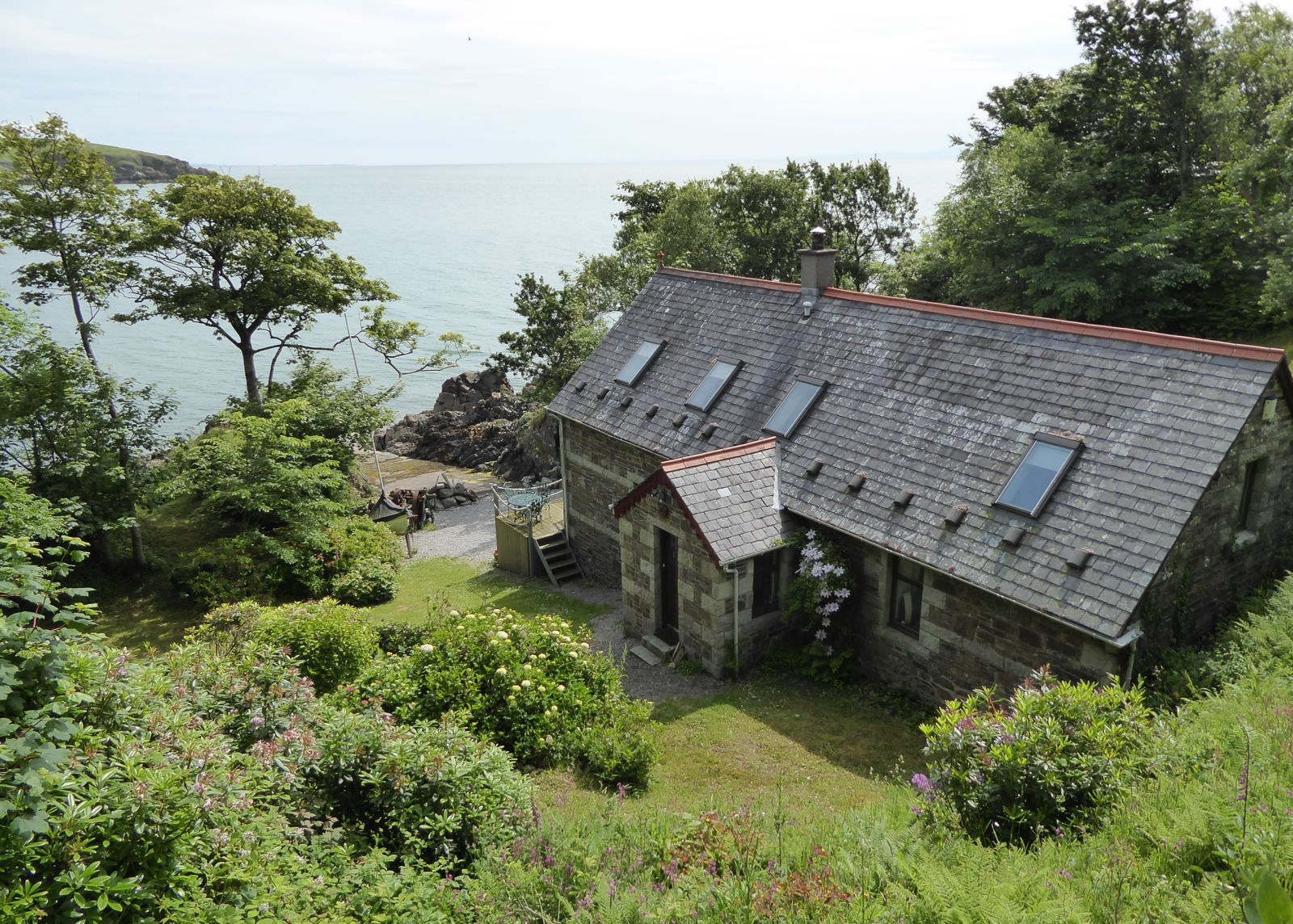
- Former Lifeboat Station, Balcary

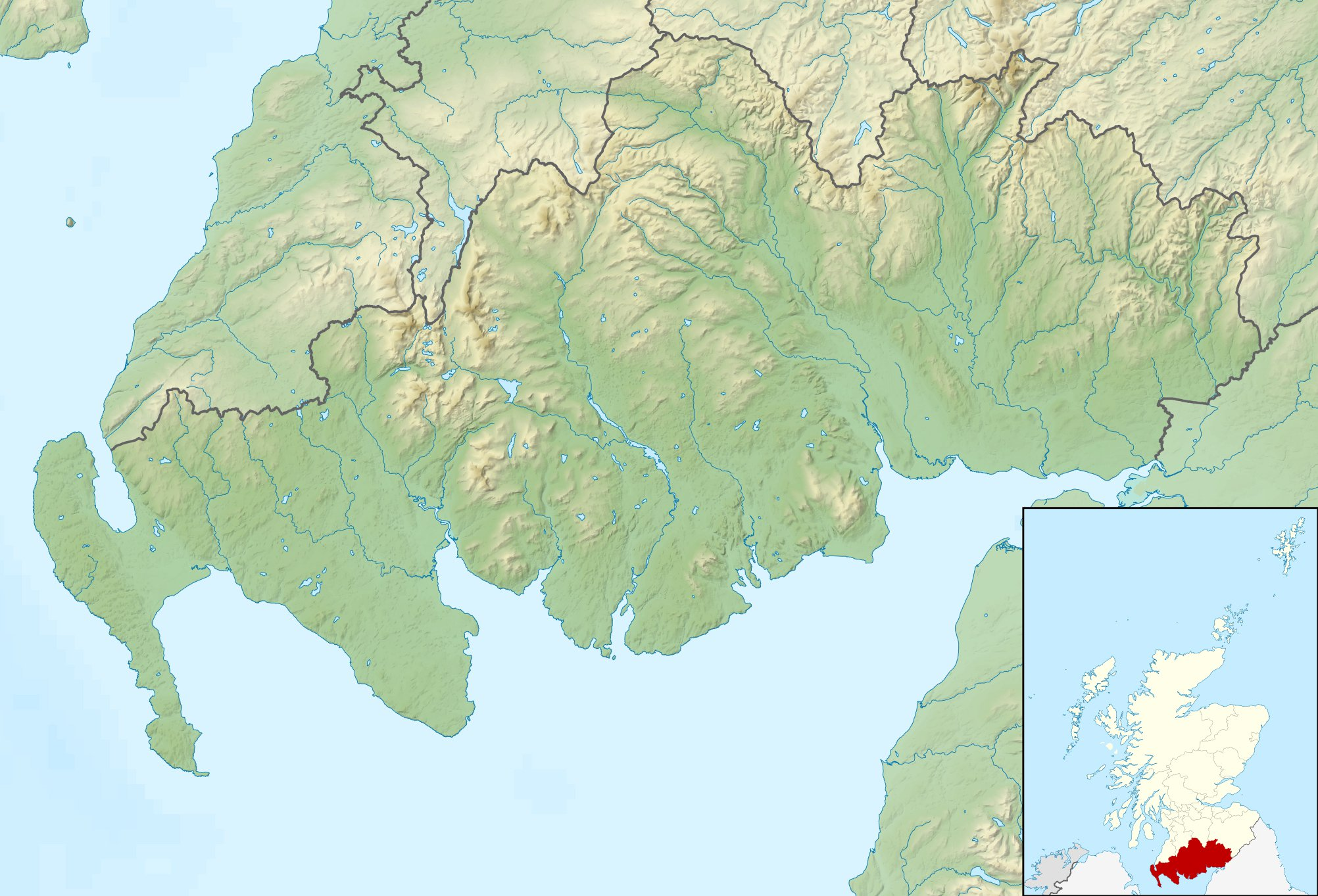
- Balcary Point, Dumfries and Galloway

General information
- Status: Closed
- Type: RNLI Lifeboat Station
- Location: Balcary Point, Auchencairn, Dumfries and Galloway, DG7 1QZ, Scotland
- Coordinates: 54°49′32.2″N 3°49′33.9″W
- Opened: 1884
- Closed: 1931

Balcary Lifeboat Station was located under Balcary Hill at Balcary Point, at the southern end of Auchencairn Bay, overlooking Hestan Island on the Solway Firth, approximately 10 miles (16 km) south of Castle Douglas, in the county of Dumfries and Galloway, Scotland.

A lifeboat was first stationed at Balcary Point by the Royal National Lifeboat Institution (RNLI) in 1884.

Balcary Lifeboat Station was no longer required following the placement of a motor-powered lifeboat at Kirkcudbright, and closed in 1931.

== History ==
In 1884, four fishermen were awarded £3 (15 shillings each) by the Kirkcudbright RNLI Committee, for the rescue of the three crew of the vessel Mary and Jane, wrecked on the Barnhouie Sands. Following this incident, the RNLI then agreed to place a lifeboat at Balcary, which arrived in November 1884.

A lifeboat house was constructed at Balcary Point, at a cost of £518-17s. A new 34-foot self-righting 'Pulling and Sailing' (P&S) lifeboat, one with both sails and (10) oars, built by Forrestt of Limehouse, London, and costing £363, was sent to the new station.

Having been transported by rail to Dalbeattie, the lifeboat was being unloaded, when a chain broke. The boat was holed on a railway carriage buffer, and one of the crew broke his leg. After prompt repairs, a naming ceremony was held on 18 December 1884, with a bottle of wine being broken over the boat. The lifeboat was named David Hay (ON 84), the boat and equipment having been funded from the bequest of the late Mr. David Hay of Edinburgh.

In the RNLI journal 'The Lifeboat' of November 1885, it was stated that Balcary Point in Auchencairn Bay, was considered "to be an excellent position whence a Lifeboat can proceed to shipwrecks on that part of the coast". This may well have been very true, but raising a crew was not quite as easy. Besides two local Coxswains, with three men from Balcary and Auchencairn, four were from Palnackie, four from Kippford, and one came from Rockliffe some 15 miles (24 km) by road. As a result, there was great difficulty even arranging practice sessions. In 1898, it was decided that the Second Coxswain and six crew from Kirkcudbright should attend each practice and service, the landlord of the Commercial Hotel, Kirkcudbright providing transportation for £1 each time. In 1908, the RNLI decided that this still wasn't good enough, as the remaining crew were willing volunteers but not experienced seafaring men. From this point, the lifeboat would be manned by the full Kirkcudbright crew until 1928.

In service for 30 years from 1884 to 1914, the lifeboat David Hay was launched 11 times, and rescued 17 lives. The boat was replaced in 1914 by the slightly larger 35-foot Scotia (ON 643). Only one service by the Scotia is recorded, to the steamship Mona's Belle of Port Erin, aground on Barnhourie Sands. The crew managed to walk ashore at low water, and the lifeboat wasn't required.

With the arrival of a motor-powered lifeboat at Kirkcudbright in 1928, the Balcary lifeboat was surplus to requirements. Balcary Lifeboat Station was closed in 1931.

The lifeboat David Hay (ON 84) was sold locally in 1915. Scotia (ON 643) was transferred to the relief fleet, and then sold in 1936. She was finally broken up at Canvey Island in 2005. After being abandoned for 60 years, the former lifeboat station was sold in 1998. M. Gaffney & Sons were 'Highly Commended' by the Federation of Master Builders, for their work restoring the 114-year-old former lifeboat station, which is now a private residence.

== Balcary lifeboats ==
=== Pulling and Sailing (P&S) lifeboats ===
ON (Note: ON is the RNLI's Official Number of the boat.)	Name	Built	On station	Class	Comments
84	David Hay	1884	1884−1914	34-foot Self-righting (P&S)	(Note: 34-foot x 8-foot 3in (10-oared) self-righting (P&S) lifeboat, legacy of Mr D. Hay of Edinburgh, built by Forrestt of Limehouse, London, costing £363.)
643	Scotia	1914	1914−1931	35-foot Self-righting (P&S)	(Note: 35-foot x 8-foot 10in (10-oared) self-righting (P&S) lifeboat, gift of Miss G. E. Richings of Hemel Hempstead, built by Thames Ironworks of Blackwall, London, completed by S. E. Saunders of Cowes, costing £1,416.)

== See also ==
- List of RNLI stations
- List of former RNLI stations
- Royal National Lifeboat Institution lifeboats
