= Greenore Lifeboat Station =

Former lifeboat station in County Louth, Ireland

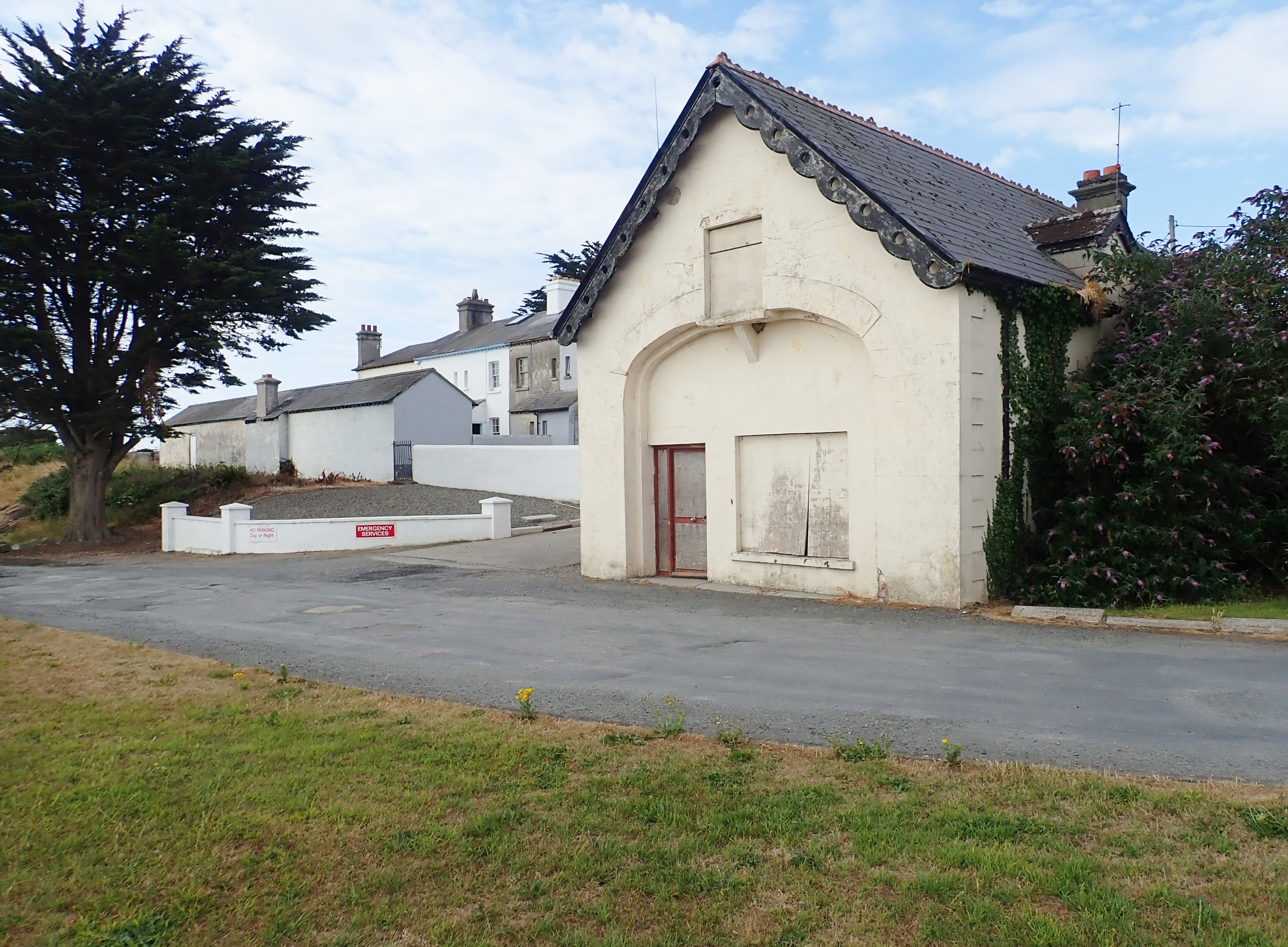
- Greenore lifeboat house in 2018

- Greenore, County Louth

General information
- Status: Closed
- Type: RNLI Lifeboat Station
- Location: The Lifeboat House, Shore Road, Greenore, County Louth, Ireland
- Coordinates: 54°01′54.0″N 6°07′50.9″W
- Opened: 1894
- Closed: 1920

Greenore Lifeboat Station was located at Shore road, in the village and deep-water port of Greenore, on the south side of Carlingford Lough, in County Louth, Ireland.

A lifeboat was first stationed at Greenore by the Royal National Lifeboat Institution (RNLI) in 1894.

After only 10 calls in 26 years, and none for the last nine years, the Greenore Lifeboat Station was closed in 1920.

== History ==
The RNLI decided to establish a lifeboat station at Greenore, following representation from officials and local residents, who considered the establishment of a lifeboat station as "a necessity, as an additional safeguard for life-saving purposes for that part of the coast, the adjacent Life-boats being Newcastle in Dundrum Bay on the north, and Giles' Quay (Dundalk) on the south, and there being considerable steamboat and other traffic in and out of the Lough."

In 1894, a 37-foot self-righting 'Pulling and Sailing' (P&S) lifeboat, one with sails and 12 oars, double banked, and of the most modern design, with water-ejection, ballast tanks and drop keels, was sent to Greenore, in County Louth. A boathouse had been constructed next to the coastguard station, at a cost of £541, on land granted by Mrs Purcell.

The boat, costing £496, was funded by donations from Post Office staff, in memory of the late Sir Stevenson Arthur Blackwood KCB, (1832–1893), Secretary-General of the General Post Office, and was duly named Sir Arthur Blackwood (ON 373).

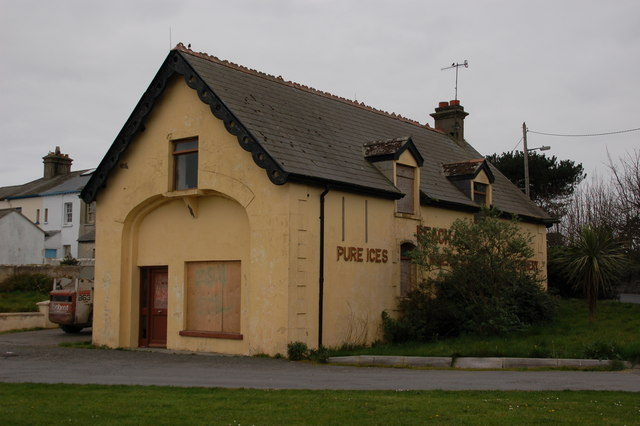
Greenore lifeboat house in 2007

The first service for the lifeboat was on 2 March 1896, when she was launched to the steamship Rosstrevor, of the London and North Western Railway Company. Just leaving Greenore at 18:00, the vessel ran aground on a rock. After firing distress signals, the lifeboat was launched by 19:00. 17 women and children were taken off by the lifeboat, and landed at Greenore. The remaining passengers were transferred to a sister vessel, the Severn. With the assistance of the Severn and the Tugboat Violet, the vessel was beached before she sank. The boat was repaired and re-floated a few days later.

The greatest shipping disaster to befall the area, was on 3 November 1915. In gale-force conditions, the passenger ferry SS Connemara, bound from Greenore to Holyhead, collided with the SS Retriever of the Clanrye Steamship company of Newry, at the entrance to Carlingford Lough. Both vessels sank within minutes. There was only one survivor of the 98 passengers and crew. There is no record that the lifeboat was ever called.

On 24 June 1911, the Greenore lifeboat would be called for the last time. Four people were rescued from the yacht Volga, which had been drifting and dragging her anchor in Carlingford Lough.

At a meeting of the RNLI committee of management on Friday 19 July 1920, it was decided to close Greenore Lifeboat Station. The lifeboat had not been called in nine years, but in the 26 years on service, it had been launched 10 times, and saved 31 lives.

The lifeboat house still stands. The lifeboat, Sir Arthur Blackwood (ON 373), was transferred to the RNLI relief fleet, serving for a further six years, before being sold in 1926. No further records of the boat are available.

== Greenore lifeboat ==
ON (Note: ON is the RNLI's Official Number of the boat.)	Name	Built	On station	Class	Comments
373	Sir Arthur Blackwood	1894	1894−1920	37-foot Self-righting (P&S)	(Note: 37-foot x 9-foot (12-oared) self-righting (P&S) lifeboat, gift of the Sir A. Blackwood Mem. fund (GPO), built by Reynolds of Lowestoft, costing £496.)

== See also ==
- List of RNLI stations
- List of former RNLI stations
- Royal National Lifeboat Institution lifeboats
