= Ballywalter Lifeboat Station =

Former RNLI lifeboat station in County Down, Northern Ireland

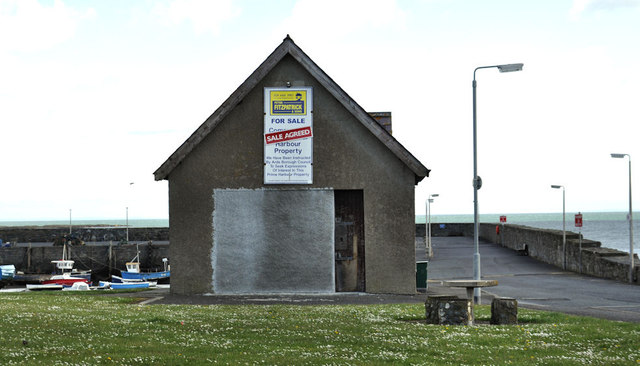
- Former lifeboat station at Ballywalter

- Location within Northern Ireland

General information
- Status: Closed
- Type: RNLI Lifeboat Station
- Location: Harbour Road, Ballywalter, County Down, BT22 2PQ, Northern Ireland
- Coordinates: 54°32′35.1″N 5°28′55.4″W
- Opened: 27 September 1866
- Closed: 1906

Ballywalter Lifeboat Station was located at the pier head at Harbour Road, in Ballywalter, a village located on the east coast of the Ards Peninsula, in County Down, Northern Ireland.

A lifeboat was first stationed at Ballywalter in 1866, by the Royal National Lifeboat Institution (RNLI).

After operating for 40 years, Ballywalter Lifeboat Station closed in 1906.

== History ==
On 30 December 1828, the steamship Sheffield ran aground on Skullmartin Rock off Ballywalter. All on board, the Master, 20 crew, and 24 passengers were saved, after rescue efforts lasting over 6 hours.

Ever since its founding in 1824, the Royal National Institution for the Preservation of Life from Shipwreck (RNIPLS), later to become the RNLI in 1854, would award medals for deeds of gallantry at sea, even if no lifeboats were involved. Three silver medals were awarded for the rescue, including one to Mr James Askin, who volunteered to fill an empty seat in the coastguard boat.

Inspector of Lifeboats, Capt. John Ward, visited Ballywalter in 1865, and his report to the RNLI committee of management on 3 August 1865 was read and approved. It was reported in the October 1866 RNLI journal 'The Lifeboat', that a station had been established at Ballywalter, the location chosen as there were sufficient numbers of fishermen to support a crew, and was in response to the number of wrecks on that unprotected coast, especially on the nearby Skullmartin Rock, the nearest lifeboat stations being Groomsport 12 miles (19 km) to the north, and Tyrella 27 miles (43 km) to the south.

The Ballywalter lifeboat station was officially opened on 27 September 1866. The Rev Hugh Wilson was appointed Honorary Secretary, Robert Boyd as coxswain and Robert Adair as second coxswain. A boathouse was built near the Ballywalter pier by Samuel Grivin, at a cost of £178-10-0d. A 32-foot lifeboat, 10-oared with twin masts, and the carriage, were conveyed to Belfast in July 1866, transported free of charge by the London and Belfast Steam Shipping Company.

The cost of the lifeboat, carriage, equipment and boathouse were all funded by a generous donation of £500 from the Misses Maynell-Ingram of Rugeley, Staffordshire, and the lifeboat was named Admiral Henry Meynell in memory of their late uncle.

On Boxing Day, 26 December 1868, the lifeboat capsized whilst on exercise, throwing out all the occupants. The lifeboat quickly self-righted, and all the other crew regained the boat, but Coxswain Robert Boyd was drowned. The RNLI donated a sum of £50 to his dependants. A report was recorded in the edition of 'The Lifeboat' of 1 April 1869.

"The Committee regret, however, having to report that on one occasion when exercising the Ballywater life-boat in the month of December, it was upset by being overpressed with sail, and the coxswain, through having neglected properly to adjust his lifebelt, unfortunately perished. It is a source of much satisfaction to the Committee to be able to report that the crews of the several life-boats of the Institution continue to regard them with unbounded confidence. This confidence is undoubtedly fully justified by the very small number of lives which (considering the perilous character of the life-boat work) have been lost from them, amounting to less than an average of one in each year since the Institution, in the year 1852, undertook the work of. providing our coasts with improved life-boats."

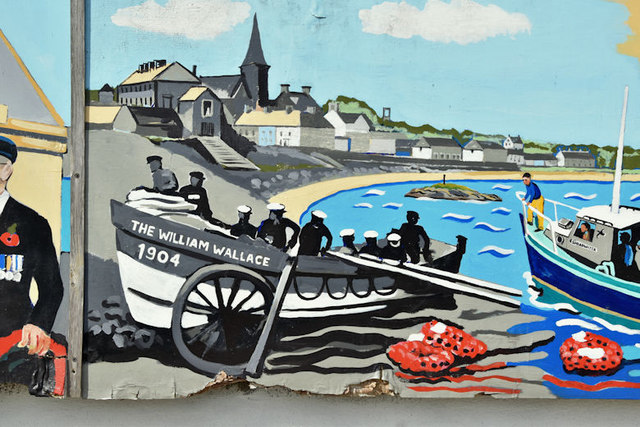
Ballywalter Mural

A replacement lifeboat was sent to Ballywalter, arriving on 31 January 1885. The larger 34-foot lifeboat was given free passage from Liverpool to Belfast by the Belfast and Londonderry Steam Packet Company. Funded from the legacy of Mr William Wallace of Curtain Road, Shoreditch, the lifeboat was named William Wallace (ON 93).

Ballywalter Lifeboat Station was closed in 1906. It was reported that the lifeboat was only called upon once in its last nine years on station. The lifeboat house is still standing. The lifeboat on station at the time, William Wallace (ON 93), was withdrawn from service, and broken up.

== Notable rescues ==
The Castlemaine of Liverpool was driven ashore at Ballyhalbert Bay in the early hours of 4 March 1881, on passage from Rangoon to Glasgow. The lifeboat was transported 3 miles (4.8 km) south, to be launched into the gale force conditions. The lifeboat struggled to make progress against the wind and rain, but a line was retrieved from the vessel, and the lifeboat was pulled to the vessel. In two trips, all 25 crew were rescued. The Ballywalter Honorary Secretary, Rev. J. O'Reilly Blackwood, had gone out on the boat, and for this service, and in recognition of his contribution to the RNLI, he was awarded the RNLI Silver Medal, along with a silver medal, awarded by the Liverpool Shipwreck and Humane Society.

In the afternoon of 6 February 1883, the brig Euphemia Fullerton of Derry, bound to Maryport, was driven onto Long Rock. With Rev. J. O'Reilly Blackwood taking charge as usual, a crowd of villages hauled the lifeboat by road to the scene, which was then launched with much difficulty, first having two ditches to traverse. In the strong ESE gale, the lifeboat was driven back ashore, with three oars broken. Launching again at 03:00, six crew who had spent the night lashed to the rigging, were finally rescued from the vessel. Rev. J. O'Reilly Blackwood was awarded the RNLI Silver Medal, as was George Prior, Chief Officer of H.M. Coastguard, Ballywalter, "in recognition of his services in helping to launch and recover the lifeboat on this occasion", after he waded out into the surf at great personal risk. Lifeboat launcher J. B. Glover was accorded "The Thanks of the Institution inscribed on Vellum".

== Station honours ==
The following are awards made at Ballywalter.

- RNIPLS Silver Medal

Philip Lithaby, Chief Boatman, H.M. Coastguard, Ballywalter – 1829
James Askin – 1829
William Morrison, Pilot – 1829

- RNLI Silver Medal

Rev. J. O'Reilly Blackwood, Honorary Secretary – 1881

Rev. J. O'Reilly Blackwood, Honorary Secretary – 1883 (Second-Service clasp)
George Prior, Chief Officer, H.M. Coastguard, Ballywalter – 1883

Robert Adair, Coxswain – 1883

- Silver Medal, awarded by the Liverpool Shipwreck and Humane Society

Rev. J. O'Reilly Blackwood, Honorary Secretary – 1881

- The Thanks of the Institution inscribed on Vellum

Rev Hugh Wilson, Honorary Secretary – 1872

Rev Hugh Wilson, Honorary Secretary – 1876

Rev. J. O'Reilly Blackwood, Honorary Secretary – 1880 (two awards)

J. B. Glover, launcher – 1883

- A Framed Letter of Thanks signed by the Chairman of the Institution

Rev. Dr. J. A. Greer, Honorary Secretary – 1896

== Roll of honour ==
In memory of those lost whilst serving Ballywalter lifeboat.

- Drowned when the lifeboat capsized on exercise, 26 December 1868

Robert Boyd, Coxswain - 1868

== Ballywalter lifeboats ==
=== Pulling and Sailing (P&S) lifeboats ===
| ON (Note: ON is the RNLI's Official Number of the boat.) | Name | Built | On station | Class | Comments |
|---|---|---|---|---|---|
| Pre-465 | Admiral Henry Meynell | 1866 | 1866–1885 | 32-foot Prowse Self-righting (P&S) | (Note: 32-foot x 7-foot 6in (10-oared) Prowse-class self-righting (P&S) lifeboat, gift of Misses Meynell-Ingram of Rugeley, built by Forrestt of Limehouse, London, costing £242.); Capsized 26 December 1868. |
| 93 | William Wallace | 1885 | 1885–1906 | 34-foot Self-righting (P&S) | (Note: 34-foot x 7-foot 6in (10-oared) self-righting (P&S) lifeboat, Gift of Mr W. Wallace of Edinburgh, built by Woolfe of Shadwell, London, costing £350.) |

Station Closed, 1906

Pre ON numbers are unofficial numbers used by the Lifeboat Enthusiast Society to reference early lifeboats not included on the official RNLI list.

== See also ==
- List of RNLI stations
- List of former RNLI stations
- Royal National Lifeboat Institution lifeboats
