= Rogerstown Lifeboat Station =

Former RNLI lifeboat station in County Dublin, Ireland

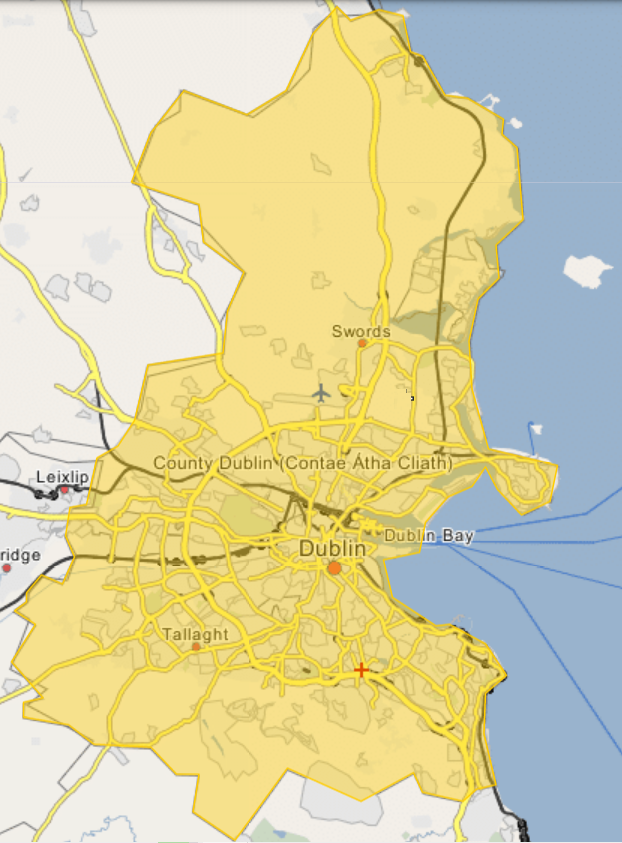
- Rogerstown, County Dublin

General information
- Status: Closed
- Type: RNLI Lifeboat Station
- Location: Rogerstown Estuary, Rush, County Dublin, Ireland
- Coordinates: 53°30′39.1″N 6°07′07.0″W
- Opened: 17 February 1874
- Closed: 1882

Rogerstown Lifeboat Station is thought to have been located on the northern shore of the Ballyboghil River and the Rogerstown Estuary, in the area now occupied by the Rush Sailing Club, now on the outskirts of Rush, a town in Fingal, historically County Dublin, on the east coast of Ireland.

A lifeboat station was first established at Rogerstown in 1874 by the Royal National Lifeboat Institution (RNLI).

After only 8 years in operation, Rogerstown Lifeboat Station was closed in 1882.

== History ==
In February 1873, and with no lifeboat available in the area, a vessel, possibly the Ada, on passage from Liverpool to Dublin on 2 February 1873, was wrecked in the area of Rogerstown Estuary. The crew were left clinging to the rigging all day, before they were rescued.

Only the previous day, the nearest lifeboat, located approximately 10 km (6.2 mi) to the north at Skerries, had been capsized whilst on service to the schooner Sarah of Runcorn. Six of the seven lifeboat crew had drowned.

It was suggested that "it would be desirable to form a Life-boat establishment at Rogerstown, other wrecks having previously occurred in the neighbourhood."

Following a visit, and the recommendation of the Assistant-Inspector of Life-boats, Capt. D. Robertson, R.N., who reported that there was sufficient local support, and available crew, at a meeting of the RNLI committee of management on Thursday 6 March 1873, it was agreed to establish a lifeboat station at Rogerstown, County Dublin.

A lifeboat house was constructed, to the designs of Mr C.H. Cooke, FRIBA, Honorary Architect to the Institution, and in February 1874, a 32-foot self-righting 'Pulling and Sailing' (P&S) lifeboat, one with sails and (10) oars, double-banked, was sent to the station.

The cost of this new Life-boat Station was gifted to the Institution by Thomas Peake of Newcastle-under-Lyne.

On 17 February 1874, a large crowd assembled for a service of dedication, performed by the Rev. E. Wrightson, and to witness the naming ceremony, the lifeboat being named The Tileries, Tunstall, in accordance with the donor's wishes.

The Rogerstown lifeboat was launched just six times, but recording no lives saved. The last recorded visit and report by a district inspector, was read at a meeting of the RNLI committee of management on Thursday 2 Mar 1882, but no actions were noted.

After just 8 years since its establishment, Rogerstown Lifeboat Station closed in 1882. The lifeboat house is thought to be long since demolished. The only lifeboat to serve at Rogerstown, The Tileries, Tunstall, was transferred to Balbriggan, where the boat was renamed with the usual local name Maid of Annan.

== Rogerstown lifeboat ==
ON (Note: ON is the RNLI's Official Number of the boat.)	Name	Built	On station	Class	Comments
Pre-585	The Tileries, Tunstall	1874	1874–1882	32-foot Prowse Self-righting (P&S)	(Note: 32-foot x 7-foot 6in (10-oared) Prowse-class self-righting (P&S) lifeboat, gift of Mr T. Peake of Tunstall, built by Woolfe of Shadwell, London, costing £252.)

Station Closed, 1882

Pre ON numbers are unofficial numbers used by the Lifeboat Enthusiast Society to reference early lifeboats not included on the official RNLI list.

== See also ==
- List of RNLI stations
- List of former RNLI stations
- Royal National Lifeboat Institution lifeboats
