= Balbriggan Lifeboat Station =

Former RNLI lifeboat station in County Dublin, Ireland

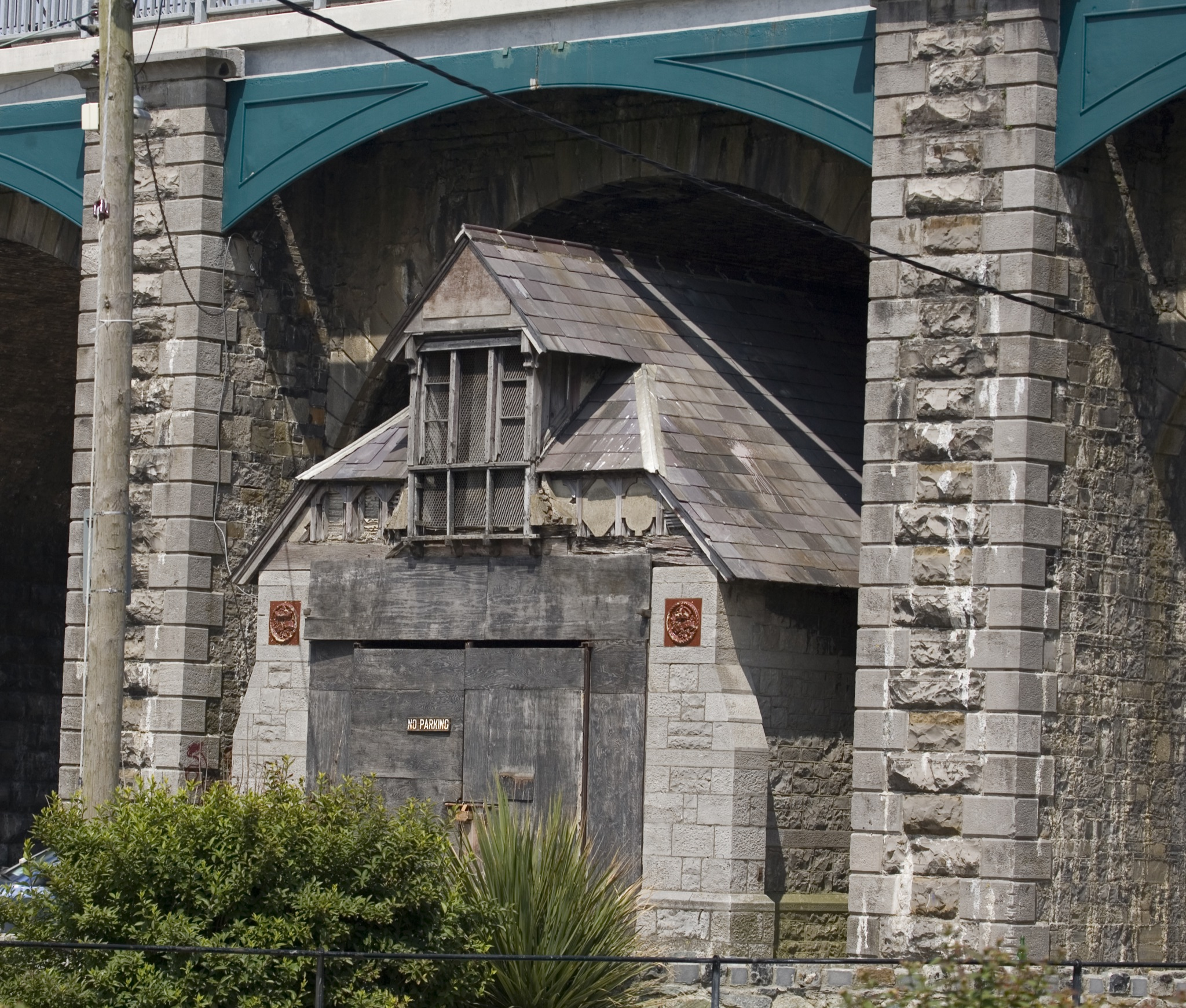
- Balbriggan Lifeboat Station

- Location within Ireland

General information
- Status: Closed
- Type: RNLI Lifeboat Station
- Location: Under the Railway Arch, Quay Street, Balbriggan, County Dublin, Ireland
- Coordinates: 53°36′39.3″N 6°10′51.3″W
- Opened: 23 December 1875
- Closed: 1898

Balbriggan Lifeboat Station was located latterly under the railway arches on Quay Street, in Balbriggan, a town in Fingal, historically County Dublin, approximately 32 km (20 mi) north of Dublin, on the east coast of Ireland.

A lifeboat station was first established at Balbriggan in 1875, by the Royal National Lifeboat Institution (RNLI).

After operating for just 22 years, Balbriggan Lifeboat Station closed in 1898.

== History ==
Ever since its founding in 1824, the Royal National Institution for the Preservation of Life from Shipwreck (RNIPLS), later to become the RNLI in 1854, would award medals for deeds of gallantry at sea, even if no lifeboats were involved. When the barque Young England of Glasgow was wrecked on Carabates Rocks near Balbriggan coastguard station, on 14 November 1852, whilst on passage from Singapore to Liverpool, Chief Officer William Barrett, H.M. Coastguard, Balbriggan, along with his son William, and the Rev. Alexander Synge, were instrumental in the rescue of 16 of the 18 crew. All three were awarded the RNIPLS Silver Medal.

On the 27 February 1875, the barque Bell Hill was wrecked at Balbriggan, on passage from Liverpool to Valparaíso. An RNLI lifeboat had been stationed at Skerries since 1854. It is not known if the lifeboat, stationed just 7 kilometres (4.3 mi) away, was ever summoned. 24 of the 25 crew of the Bell Hill were lost.

The wreck of the Bell Hill prompted the placement of a lifeboat at Balbriggan. a 30-foot self-righting 'Pulling and Sailing' (P&S) lifeboat, one with sails and 6-oars, which was dispatched to Balbriggan in November 1875, arriving on station on 23 December 1875, along with its transporting carriage. A new boathouse was constructed, in the shadow of the Balbriggan Martello tower, complete with slipway. The lifeboat had been provided by the gift of Mrs Langworthy of Manchester, and in accordance with her wishes, was named Maid of Annan.

Two further lifeboats would be sent to Balbriggan. In 1883, a slightly older lifeboat, but 2-foot longer, was placed at the station. The RNLI received a further gift of £1000 from Mrs Langworthy, and the boat, formerly at Rogerstown, was renamed Maid of Annan. The third and final lifeboat to be placed at Balbriggan, arrived on station in 1889. Newly built in 1889, the lifeboat was again slightly longer, at 34-feet. Funded once again by Mrs Langworthy, it was also named Maid of Annan (ON 246).

An imposing granite new boathouse was constructed in 1889, to house the larger 34-foot lifeboat, at a cost of £150. The building was constructed underneath one of the 11 railway arches of the Dublin and Drogheda Railway, which by then had become the Great Northern Railway (Ireland).

At the Annual General Meeting of the RNLI, held at St. Martin's Town Hall, Charing Cross Road, on Saturday, 18 March 1899, it was announced that Balbriggan lifeboat had been withdrawn.

The first boathouse near the Martello Tower still exists, but in a derelict state. The granite built lifeboat house under the railway also still stands. Both are currently under redevelopment as part of a €30 million regeneration scheme. The lifeboat on station at the time of closure, Maid of Annan (ON 246), was withdrawn from service, and later broken up.

== Station honours ==
The following are awards made at Balbriggan.

- RNIPLS Silver Medal

William Barrett, Chief Officer, H.M. Coastguard, Balbriggan – 1852
William Barrett Jr. – 1852
Rev. Alexander Synge – 1852

- RNLI Silver Medal

W. J. Cumisky, Honorary Secretary – 1881

- The Thanks of the Institution inscribed on Vellum

Thomas Boyd, Chief Officer, H.M. Coastguard, Balbriggan – 1881

== Balbriggan lifeboats ==
ON (Note: ON is the RNLI's Official Number of the boat.)	Name	Built	On station	Class	Comments
Pre-603	Maid of Annan	1875	1875–1883	30-foot Self-righting (P&S)	(Note: 30-foot x 6-feet 7in (6-oared) self-righting (P&S) lifeboat, gift of Mrs S. Langworthy of Manchester, built by Woolfe of Shadwell, London, costing £249.)
Pre-585	Maid of Annan	1874	1883–1889	32-foot Prowse Self-righting (P&S)	(Note: 32-foot x 7-foot 6in (10-oared) Prowse-class self-righting (P&S) lifeboat, gift of Mrs S. Langworthy of Manchester, built by Woolfe of Shadwell, London, costing £252 when new.); Previously The Tileries, Tunstall at Rogerstown.
246	Maid of Annan	1889	1889–1898	34-foot Self-righting (P&S)	(Note: 34-foot x 7-foot 6in (10-oared) self-righting (P&S) lifeboat, gift of Mrs S. Langworthy of Manchester, built by Watkins of Blackwall, London, costing £435.)

Station Closed, 1898

Pre ON numbers are unofficial numbers used by the Lifeboat Enthusiast Society to reference early lifeboats not included on the official RNLI list.

== See also ==
- List of RNLI stations
- List of former RNLI stations
- Royal National Lifeboat Institution lifeboats
