= Huna Lifeboat Station =

Former RNLI lifeboat station in Highland, Scotland

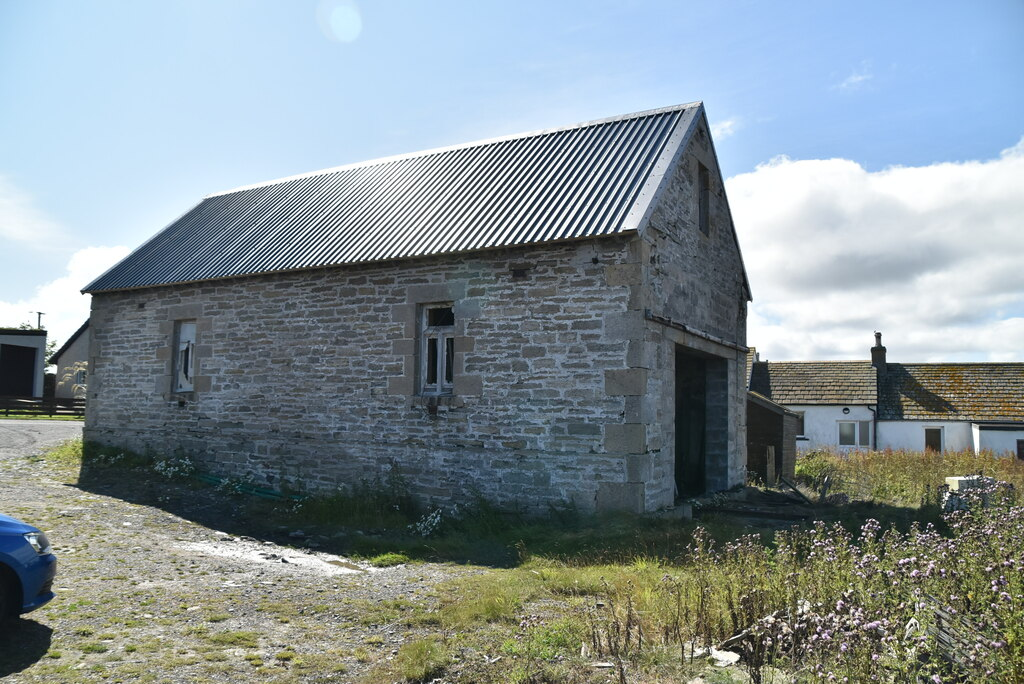
- Former Lifeboat Station at Huna, Caithness

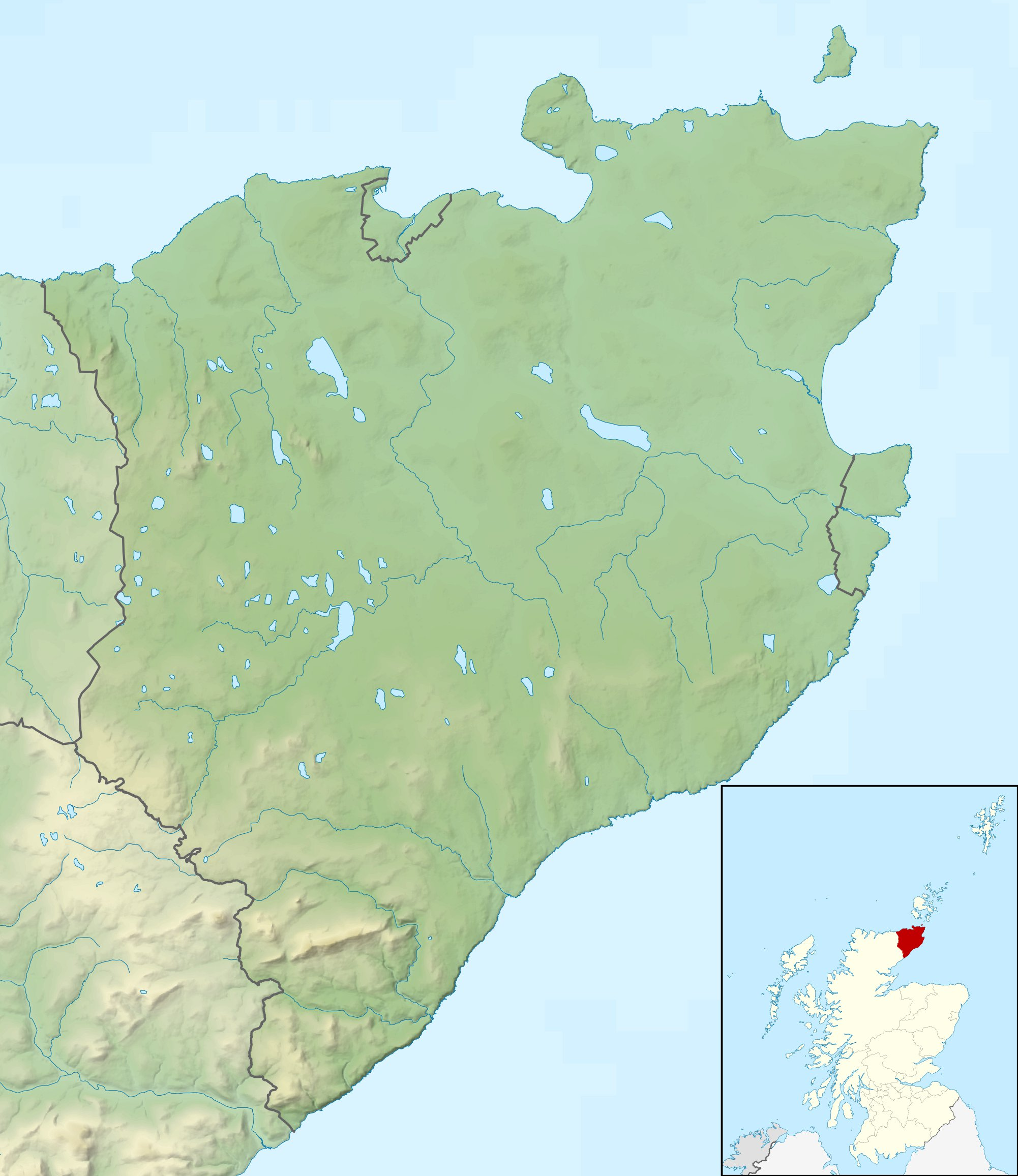
- Huna, Caithness

General information
- Status: Closed
- Type: RNLI Lifeboat Station
- Location: Huna, Highland, KW1 4YL, Scotland
- Coordinates: 58°38′37.6″N 3°06′27.0″W
- Opened: 1877
- Closed: 1930

Huna Lifeboat Station was located at Huna, a hamlet on the north eastern tip of the Highland region of Scotland, historically Caithness, overlooking the Island of Stroma in the Pentland Firth, and sitting just over 1 mile (1.6 km) to the east of John o' Groats.

A lifeboat station was established at Huna in 1877, by the Royal National Lifeboat Institution (RNLI).

After operating for 53 years, Huna Lifeboat Station closed in 1930.

== History ==
Following application from local residents, and the subsequent visit, report and recommendation by Rear-Admiral John R. Ward, RNLI Inspector of Lifeboats, it was decided at the meeting of the RNLI committee of management on 5 June 1877, to establish a lifeboat station, and place a lifeboat at Huna, on the north coast of Scotland.

At a further meeting on 2 August 1877, it was announced that the sum of £550 had been received from an anonymous donor from Manchester, known as "X.Y.Z.", to defray the cost of the lifeboat at Huna, in thanks for a child, rescued on 6 August 1873. At the donor's request, the boat was to be named W. M. C. Contributions were received locally towards the estimated £1100.00 costs of the station and future maintenance. Tenders had been accepted for the construction of a boathouse, which was built by J. Charleson for £252.00.

A report in the RNLI Journal 'The Lifeboat' of 1 August 1878 announced the arrival on station of a 34-foot self-righting 'Pulling and Sailing' (P&S) lifeboat, one with (10) oars, and sails, along with a launching carriage. "It being thought advisable to have another Life-boat Station on the south shore of Pentland Firth, a Life-boat has been placed by the Institution at Huna, in which neighbourhood most of the wrecks in that district take place. The fishermen were desirous to have such a boat, believing they would be able to do good service in it to shipwrecked crews."

On 6 December 1877, a large crowd assembled to witness the service of dedication, after which the lifeboat was duly named W. M. C. The lifeboat, which cost £363, was officially handed to the care of the local lifeboat committee, and to the cheers of the watching crowd, was launched for a demonstration of its capabilities.

In extremely rough seas and a west-south-west gale on 20 January 1883, the fishing boat Margaret Gunn of Wick, Caithness was in trouble, after her mast broke. Mast and sail were washed overboard, but it had remained attached to the vessel, causing damage to the hull. The vessel was swept along, dropping anchor when it arrived in Gills Bay, but the anchor started to drag, and the boat was still in danger of being blown ashore. The Huna lifeboat was launched at 01:00, and with skilful seamanship, the seven crew were rescued. Soon afterwards, the vessel was completely wrecked.

The W. M. C. was replaced in November 1889, with a larger 37-foot self-righting lifeboat. Funded from the legacy of the late Mr. Thomas Hackwood of Sydenham, London, she was named Caroline and Thomas (ON 202). The following year, a new boathouse was constructed, at a cost of £650, with doors at both end to allow direct launching into the sea, or for the boat to be transported out on its carriage for launching elsewhere if required. Some difficulty had previously been encountered launching the boat through a narrow 8 yd (7.3 m) gap, and so a 343-foot-long (105 m) slipway was also constructed, by Sinclair and Banks, for an additional £724. A windlass for hauling up the lifeboat was located on a concrete base across the road in a field, opposite the inshore door. Rollers were later added to the slipway at a cost of £100.

On 1 May 1900, the lifeboats from Thurso and Longhope were called. The Huna lifeboat Caroline and Thomas was also called, but was damaged during launch and returned. The lifeboat was subsequently replaced in September 1901, by the Ida, the cost of which was defrayed from the legacy of £720 from the late Miss Ida B. Simmons of Hove, Sussex.

On 8 April 1902, a message reached the station at 03:30, reporting a vessel ashore at Duncansby Head. The lifeboat crew assembled and were quickly away, soon finding the fishing trawler Ardgowan of Glasgow. Nothing else could be done at the time to save the vessel, and her crew of ten were rescued. The vessel was later refloated and towed to Wick, Caithness.

At a meeting of the RNLI committee of management on Thursday 16 January 1930, it was decided to close Huna Lifeboat Station. Motor-powered lifeboats had already been placed at the three flanking stations of Wick (1921), Longhope (1926) and Thurso (1929), effectively rendering a 'Pulling and Sailing' lifeboat obsolete. It was recorded that between 1877 and 1930, the Huna lifeboat launched on service twenty-nine times, and saved twenty-seven lives.

The lifeboat house still stands, used as a store. The concrete base for the windlass, later a winch, can still seen in the garden opposite the station. The lifeboat on station at the time of closure, Ida (ON 470), already 29-years-old, was sold from service. No further details of the boat are known.

== Huna lifeboats ==
=== Pulling and Sailing (P&S) lifeboats ===
ON (Note: ON is the RNLI's Official Number of the boat.)	Name	Built	On station	Class	Comments
Pre-633	W. M. C.	1877	1877−1889	34-foot Self-righting (P&S)	(Note: 34-foot x 8-foot 3in (10-oared) self-righting (P&S) lifeboat, anonymous gift of 'X.Y.Z', built by Woolfe of Shadwell, London, costing £363.)
202	Caroline and Thomas	1889	1889−1901	37-foot Self-righting (P&S)	(Note: 37-foot x 8-feet (12-oared) self-righting (P&S) lifeboat, legacy of Mr T. Hackwood of Sydenham, built by D. and W. Henderson and Company of Partick, costing £495.)
470	Ida	1901	1901−1930	37-foot Self-righting (P&S)	(Note: 37-foot x 9-foot 3in (10-oared) self-righting (P&S) lifeboat, legacy of Miss Ida B. Simmons of Hove, built by Thames Ironworks of Blackwall, London, costing £903.)

Pre ON numbers are unofficial numbers used by the Lifeboat Enthusiast Society to reference early lifeboats not included on the official RNLI list.

== See also ==
- List of RNLI stations
- List of former RNLI stations
- Royal National Lifeboat Institution lifeboats
