= Beaucette Marina =

Marina on the northeast tip of Guernsey

Coordinates: 49°30′11″N 2°30′21″W

Beaucette Marina is a marina on the northeast tip of Guernsey, in the Channel Islands, to the north of Bordeaux Harbour. Nearby is the Déhus Dolmen.

The marina area was once a large quarry, with blue granite reserves. In the 1960s, the quarry was purchased by Vale Investments, who saw the potential for converting it into a marina. In July 1968 the Royal Engineers were given a budget of just £725 to blow a hole in the rock and inundate the quarry. They assessed the location as an ideal spot for a harbour because of the durability of the blue granite. The task became much more complicated than expected and was postponed until the following year, when the Engineers returned and eventually created the marina by using high explosives. In the end the cost soared to £27,000, mainly paid by the British taxpayer.

Beaucette Marina Restaurant was awarded the Gold Award and Certificate of Excellence by TripAdvisor in 2016.
