= Portmellon =

Coordinates: 50.262°N 4.786°W

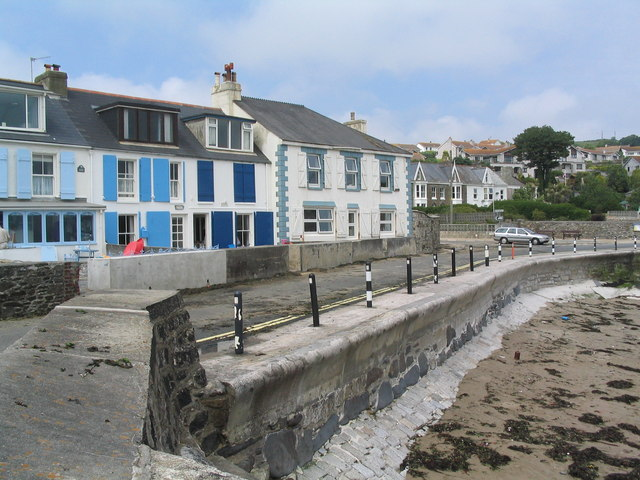
Portmellon

Portmellon (Cornish: Porthmelin) is a coastal settlement in south Cornwall, Britain, United Kingdom. It is one mile south of Mevagissey and six miles south of St Austell.

Portmellon lies within the Cornwall Area of Outstanding Natural Beauty (AONB). Almost a third of Cornwall has AONB designation, with the same status and protection as a National Park.

The sandy beach at Portmellon is safe for bathing and there is a public slipway for launching boats. The beach is set in a small cove, a 20-minute walk from Mevagissey. The beach is around 150 metres long but is completely covered at high tide. At low tide rock pools are exposed and on some occasions seals can be seen swimming off the beach or resting on the rocks.

== History ==
The Royal National Lifeboat Institution (RNLI) opened Mevagissey Lifeboat Station on 2 October 1869 on ground leased from Earl of Mount Edgcumbe at Portmellon. The lifeboat was a 33 ft (10 m) standard Self-Righter with sails and 10 oars named South Warwickshire. The boathouse at Portmellon was sold after the lifeboat was moved into Mevagissey harbour in 1888. It has been converted into a house.

Portmellon has a long history of building boats with many wooden–hulled boats leaving the workshop over the years, including Denis Hame's 20-footer named Vivian.
