= Mevagissey Lifeboat Station =

MevagisseyLifeboat Station
- Flag of the RNLI

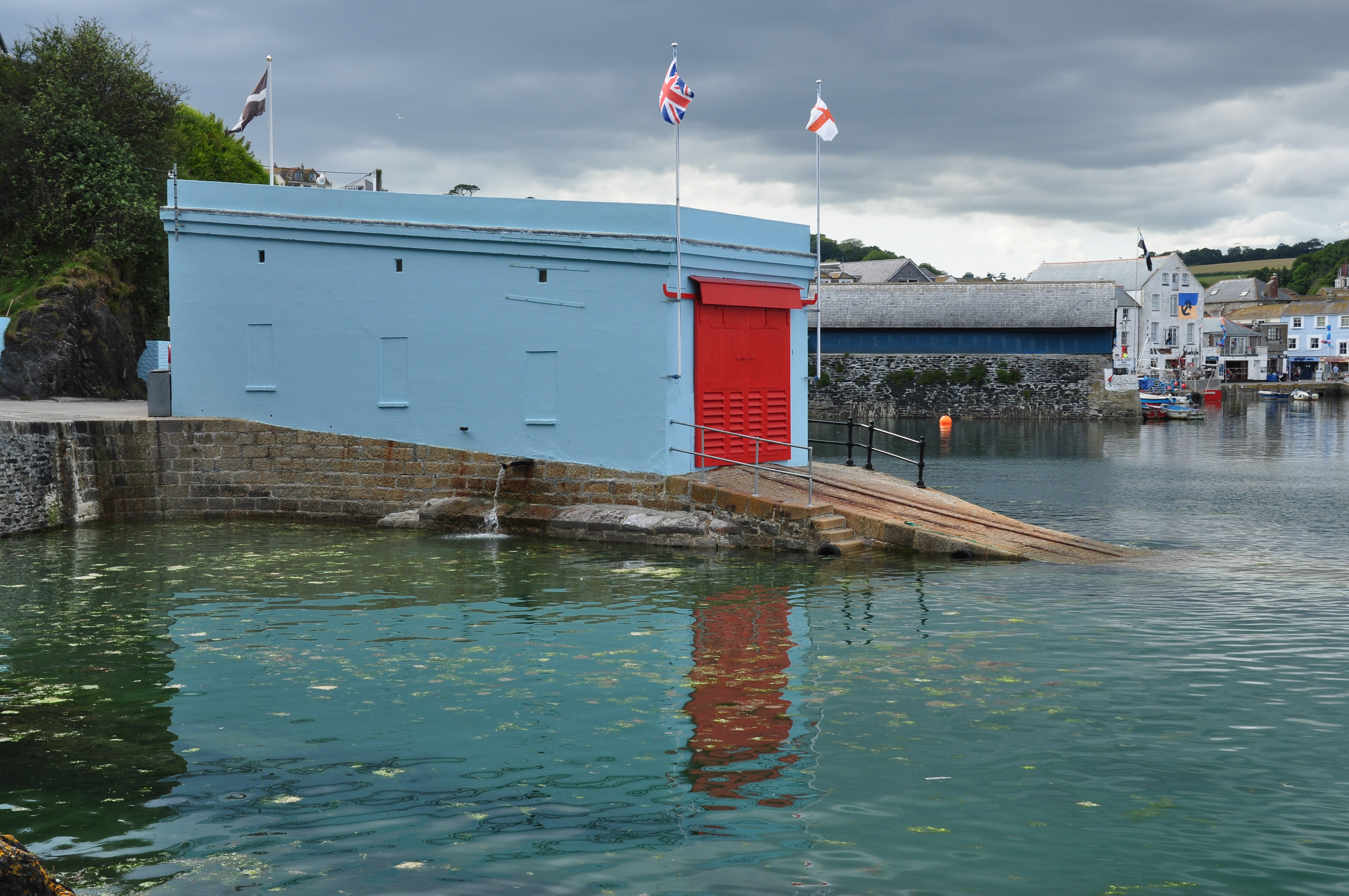
- The old lifeboat station, now an aquarium

- Map of Cornwall showing Mevagissey

General information
- Type: Lifeboat station
- Location: Mevagissey, England
- Coordinates: 50.2691°N 4.7866°W
- Opened: At Portmellon 1869; Final boathouse 1897
- Closed: 1930
- Owner: RNLI

Mevagissey Lifeboat Station was the base for a Royal National Lifeboat Institution (RNLI) lifeboat at Mevagissey in Cornwall, England, United Kingdom. It was in use from 1869 until 1930.

== History ==
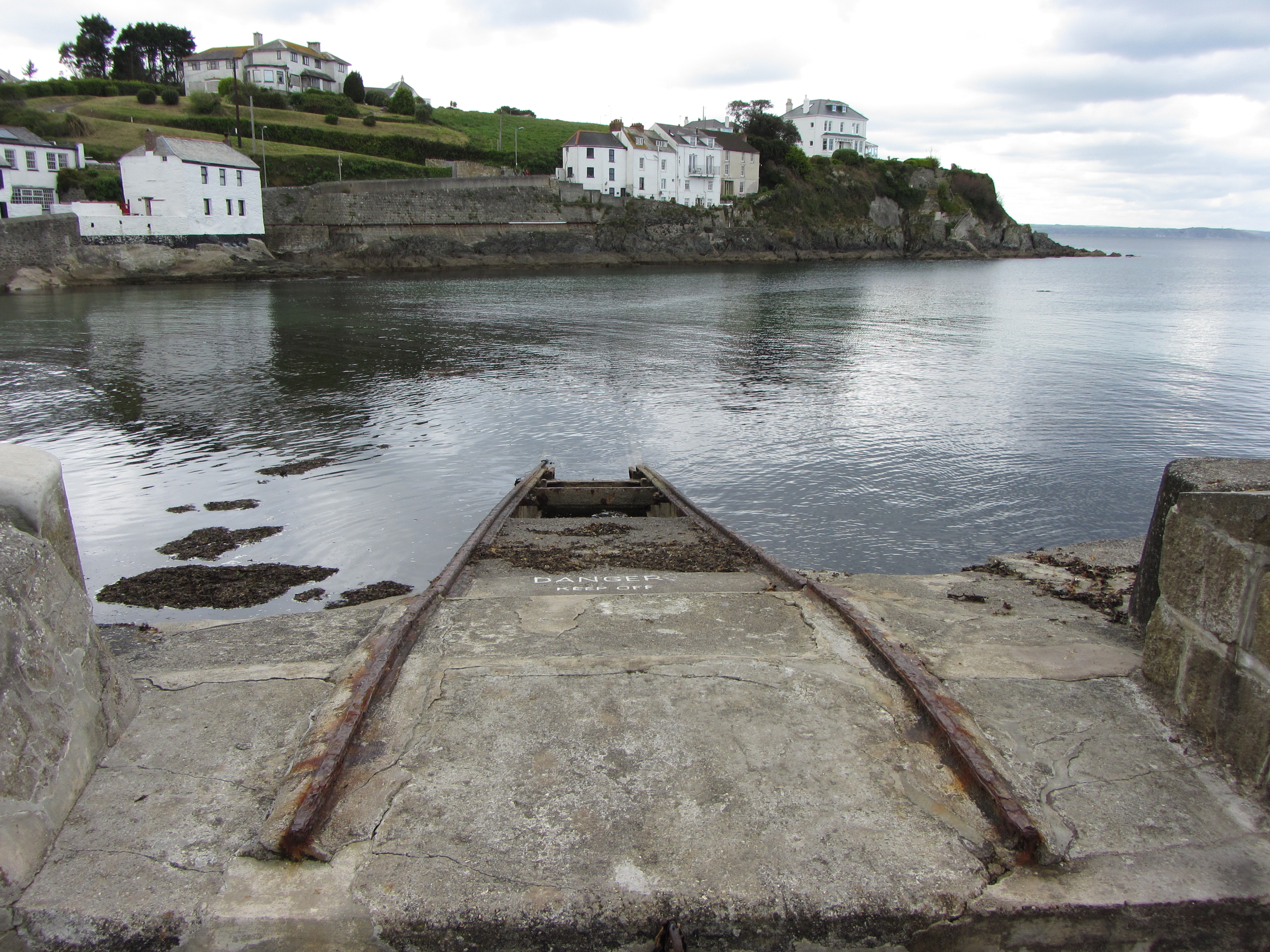
Old lifeboat slipway at Portmellon

The inner harbour at Mevagissey was created after the Mevagissey Pier Act 1775 (15 Geo. 3. c. 62) authorised the construction of a pier. By the 1850s there were about 80 fishing boats in the village and small cargo vessels also called at the harbour such as the French schooner Rochellaise which ran aground near the entrance on 14 July 1857. Two local boats went out to rescue the crew of five which resulted in the RNLI presenting silver medals to coastguard officer Henry Pomeroy and pilots Joseph Ley and William Clohe.

Requests were later made by local people for the RNLI to provide a lifeboat. After a visit by their inspector in 1869 it was agreed to do so. A boathouse (located at 50.2614°N 4.7860°W) was built at Portmellon, a cove south of the main village, on land leased from The Earl of Mount Edgcumbe. The lifeboat was demonstrated at Mevagissey and bought into service on 2 October 1869.

Two new piers were built at Mevagissey in the 1880s to create an outer harbour which gave more space for the local boats to be moored safely. When it was time to replace the lifeboat it was decided to provide a bigger boat which could be moored in the harbour and so the boathouse at Portmellon was sold. A storm in 1895 damaged the lifeboat despite being in the harbour so a boathouse and slipway was built on the south side of the outer harbour in 1896 and officially opened on 12 June 1897.

A motor lifeboat was provided for Fowey Lifeboat Station in 1928. This proved capable of covering the coast around Mevagissey so the station was closed in 1930.

== Description ==
The 1869 lifeboat house at Portmellon was a single-storey structure built on the landward side of the road that runs beside the beach. It has been converted into a house.

The 1897 boathouse and slipway at Mevagissey were built from concrete. Since being closed it has been converted into a public aquarium but is little changed externally.

== Mevagissey lifeboats ==
Three different lifeboats were stationed at Mevagissey, all of the 'pulling and sailing' type. These were equipped with oars but could use sails when conditions allowed.

At Mevagissey	ON	Name	Length	Class	Comments
1869–1888	181	South Warwickshire	33 ft (10 m)	Self-Righter	Boathouse at Portmellon.
1888–1895	224	John Arthur	37 ft (11 m)	Self-Righter	
1897–1930	403	John Chisholm	37 ft (11 m)	Self-Righter	

== Vintage lifeboats ==
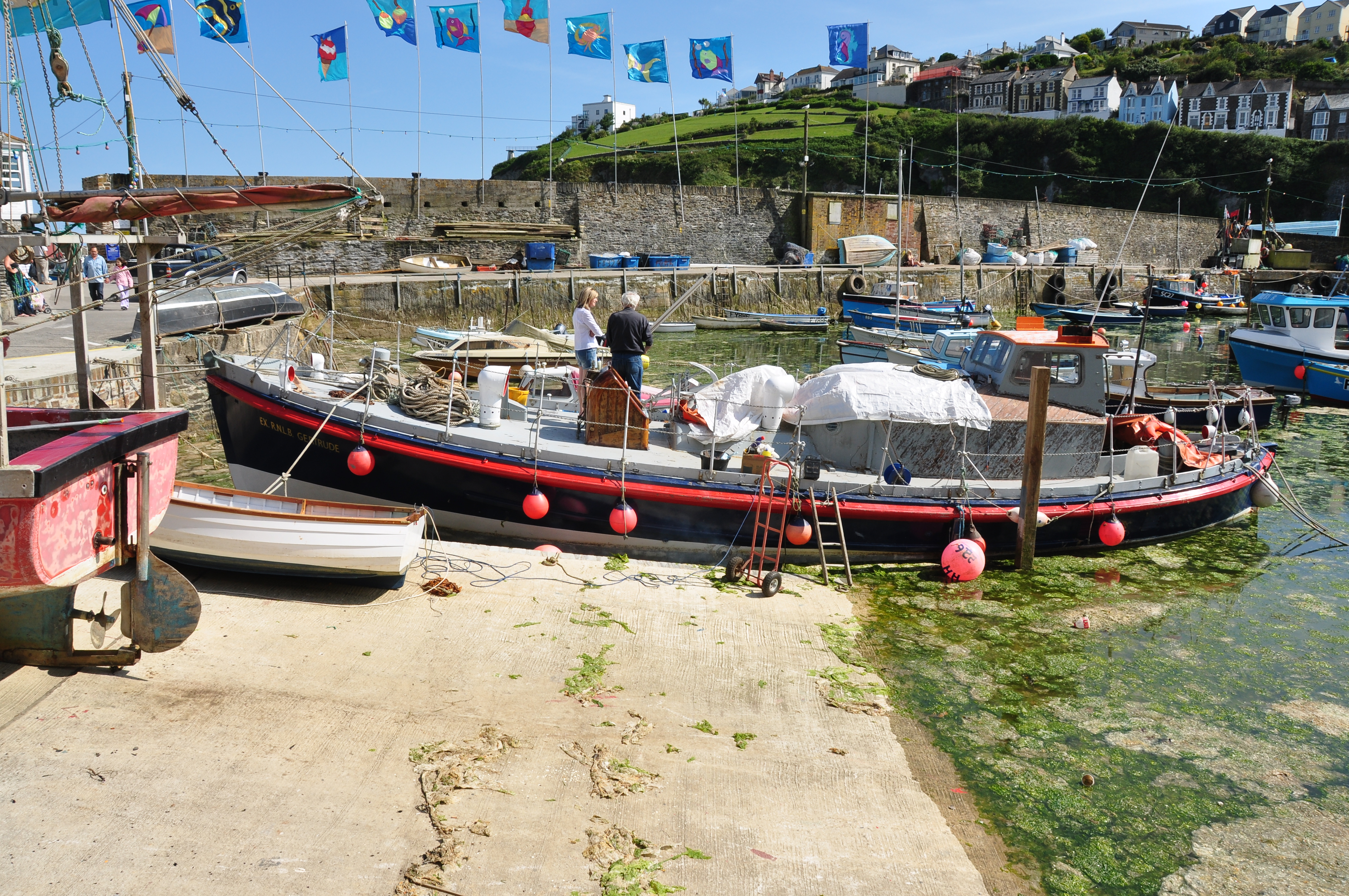
Gertrude at Mevagissey

Since the lifeboat station closed some former lifeboats have found a home at Mevagissey:

ON	Name	Length	Class	In service	Stationed at
826	Guide of Dunkirk	35 ft 6 in (10.82 m)	Self-Righter motor	1940–1963	Cadgwith (1941–1963)
847	Gertrude	46 ft (14 m)	Watson motor	1946–1981	Holy Island (1946–1968), Exmouth (1968–1970), Sheerness (1970–1974), Fowey (1980–1981)

== See also ==
- List of former RNLI stations
- Royal National Lifeboat Institution lifeboats
