= Inishlyre =

Island in Clew Bay, Ireland

Native name: Inis Laidhre
- Location within island of Ireland

Geography
- Location: Atlantic Ocean
- Coordinates: 53°49′24″N 9°39′11″W

Administration
- Ireland
- Province: Connacht
- County: Mayo

Demographics
- Population: 3 (2022)

Inishlyre (Irish: Inis Laidhre, meaning "Fork Island") is one of the last inhabited small islands in Clew Bay, Ireland, with a population of 3 people in 2022.

== Geography ==
The island is located close to Rosmoney Pier near Kilmeena.

== History ==
In the 1851 census there were 17 houses and 122 people living on the island. By 1911, that was down to 6 houses and 22 people. In the 19th century there were 2 pubs on the Islands and sea merchants dropped cargo in the island because there was no deep-sea harbour in Westport.

=== Demographics ===
The table below reports data on Inishlyre's population taken from Discover the Islands of Ireland (Alex Ritsema, Collins Press, 1999) and the census of Ireland.

Historical population

Year	Pop.	±%
1841	113	—
1851	122	+8.0%
1861	61	−50.0%
1871	73	+19.7%
1881	67	−8.2%
1891	109	+62.7%
1901	47	−56.9%
1911	22	−53.2%
1926	21	−4.5%

Year	Pop.	±%
1936	16	−23.8%
1946	11	−31.2%
1951	14	+27.3%
1956	19	+35.7%
1961	19	+0.0%
1966	17	−10.5%
1971	18	+5.9%
1979	12	−33.3%
1981	10	−16.7%

Year	Pop.	±%
1986	7	−30.0%
1991	6	−14.3%
1996	7	+16.7%
2002	7	+0.0%
2006	7	+0.0%
2011	4	−42.9%
2016	4	+0.0%
2022	3	−25.0%

Source: Central Statistics Office. "CNA17: Population by Off Shore Island, Sex and Year". irishislands.info.
