= Portloe =

Village in Cornwall, England

Coordinates: 50.2191°N 4.8917°W

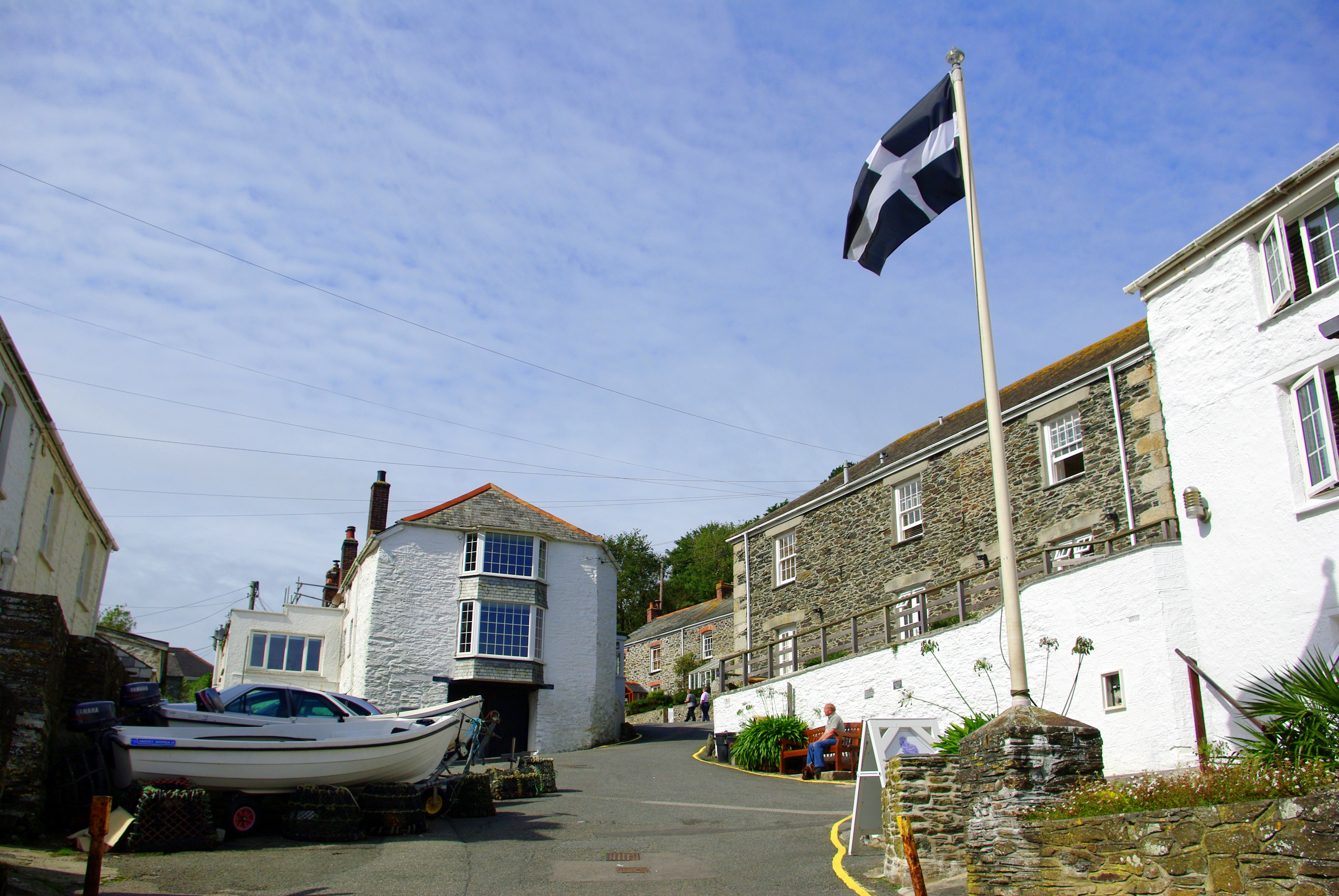
The Cornish flag flying in Portloe, to the right of the picture is The Lugger Hotel.

Portloe (Cornish: Porthlogh) is a small village in Cornwall on the Roseland Peninsula, in the civil parish of Veryan. Portloe harbours two full-time working fishing vessels, the Jasmine and Katy Lil, which fish for crab and lobster in Veryan and Gerrans Bay, and a fleet of smaller leisure boats in summer. Visitors are attracted to Portloe by its fishing, scenery, and walks.

Portloe lies within the Cornwall Area of Outstanding Natural Beauty (AONB). Almost a third of Cornwall has AONB designation, with the same status and protection as a National Park. The South West Coast Path passes through the village.

The name Portloe comes from the Cornish language words porth, meaning 'cove' or 'harbour', and logh, meaning 'lake' or 'inlet'.

== History ==
The Royal National Lifeboat Institution (RNLI) stationed a lifeboat at Portloe in 1870 but it was withdrawn in 1887 without ever having performed a rescue. It was kept at first in a boat house built at the end of the road above the beach. It proved difficult to move the boat across the beach so a new house was built in 1877 nearer the water. The first house was converted into a church; the second was a school for a while but has since become a private dwelling house.

Portloe, "the jewel of the Roseland Peninsula", was rated as among the "20 most beautiful villages in the UK and Ireland" by Condé Nast Traveler in 2020.

== Film locations ==
Used as a location for the 1964 film Crooks in Cloisters, The Lugger Hotel can clearly be seen at the film's end.

It was also the location for the BBC comedy series Wild West, which starred Dawn French and Catherine Tate and the location where Irish Jam was filmed, starring Eddie Griffin.

Just to the south of the village is Broom Parc, a cliff-top villa overlooking the sea which was the main location for Channel 4's 1992 serialisation of Mary Wesley's The Camomile Lawn. It is owned by the National Trust. In 2012, About Time, the latest Richard Curtis production, was partly filmed there.
