= Troon Lifeboat Station =

RNLI Lifeboat station in South Ayrshire, Scotland

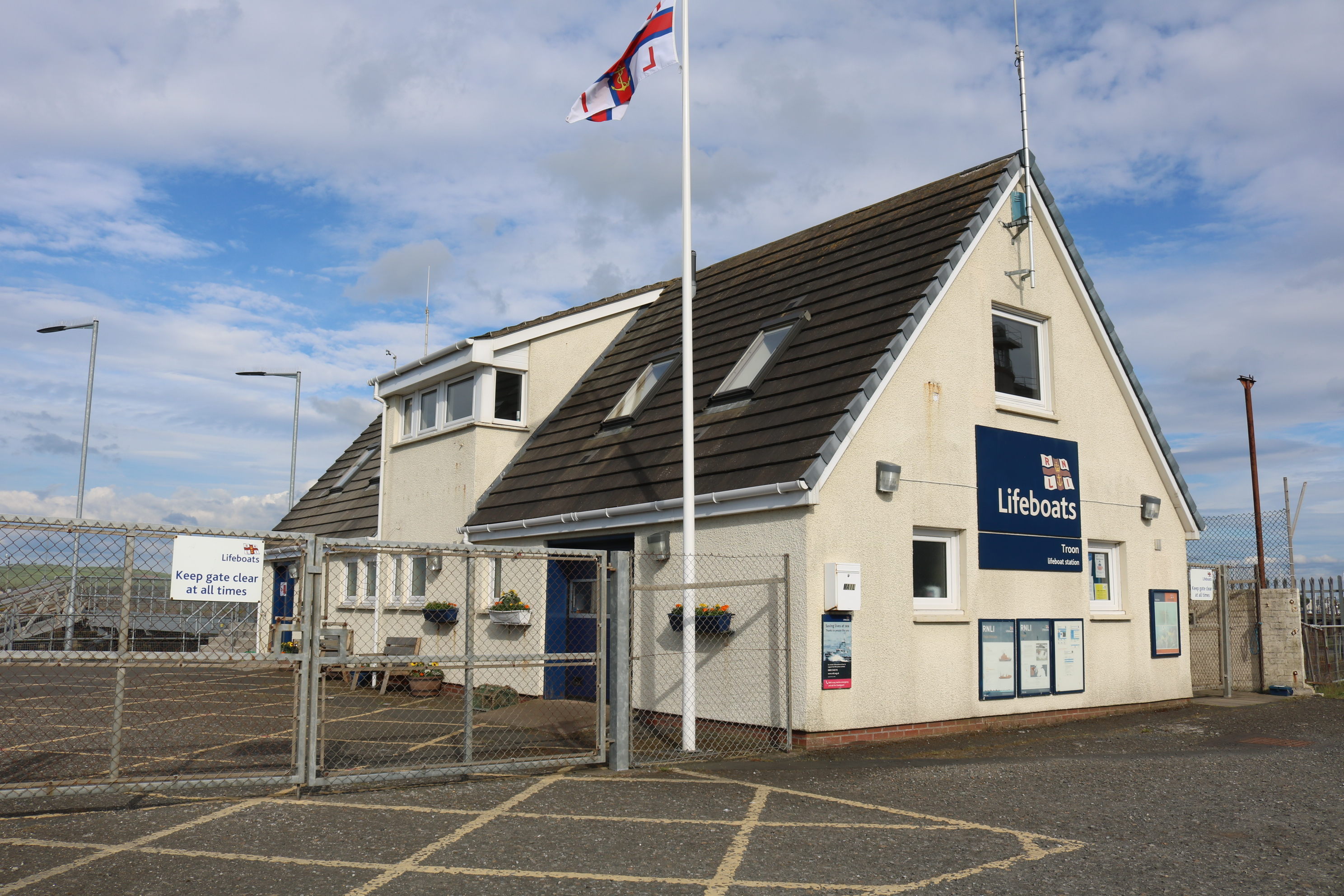
- Troon Lifeboat Station in 2021

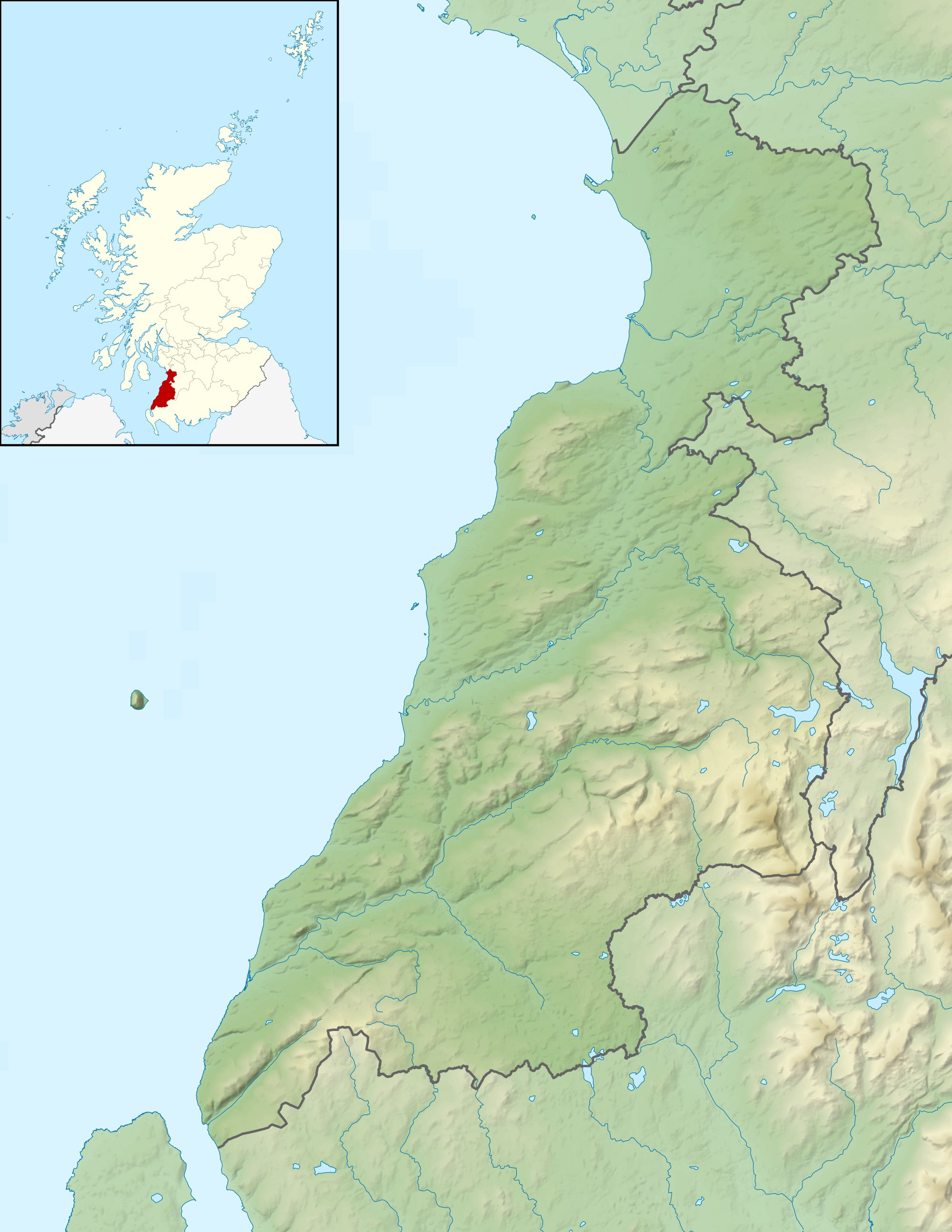
- Location within South Ayrshire

General information
- Type: Lifeboat station
- Location: The Harbour, Troon, South Ayrshire, KA10 6DX, United Kingdom
- Coordinates: 55.5481°N 4.6813°W
- Opened: First station 1871; Current building 1987
- Owner: Royal National Lifeboat Institution

Website
- RNLI Troon Lifeboat Station

Troon Lifeboat Station can be found just off Harbour Road at Troon, a port town overlooking the Firth of Clyde, approximately 30 mi (48 km) south-west of Glasgow, in the council area of South Ayrshire in Scotland.

A lifeboat station was established at Troon in 1871, by the Royal National Lifeboat Institution (RNLI).

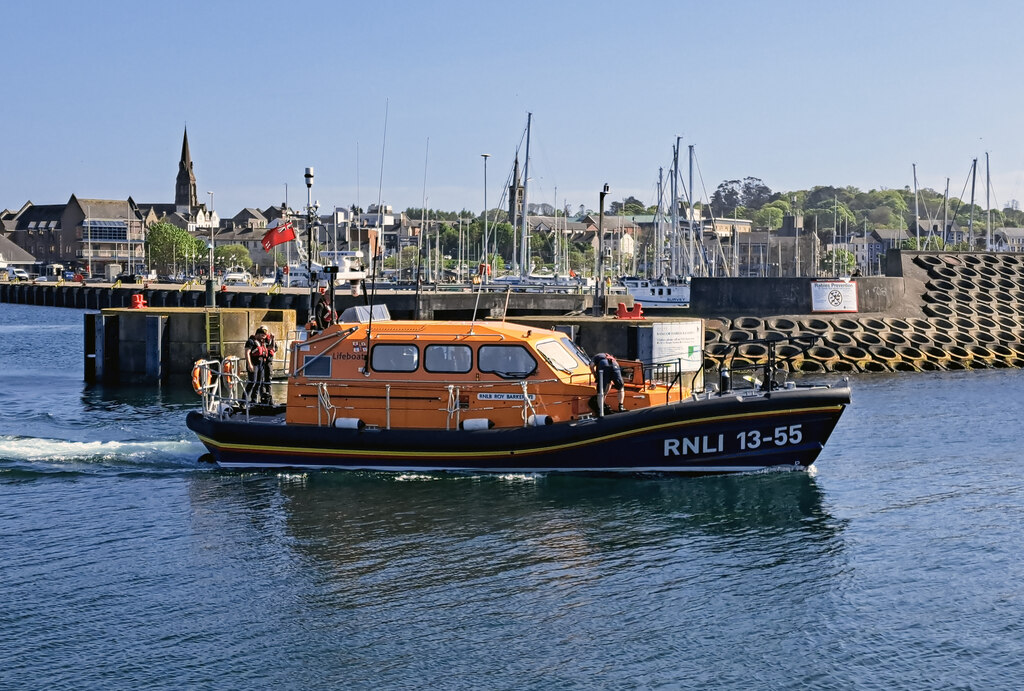
Troon Shannon-class 13-55 Roy Barker VI (ON 1362)

The station currently operates a Shannon-class All-weather lifeboat, 13-55 Roy Barker VI (ON 1362), on station since 2025, and the much smaller D-class (IB1) Inshore lifeboat, Sheena (D-821), on station since 2018.

== History ==
On 27 February 1834, five men brought a boat overland from Troon harbour to the beach, and rescued the Master and four remaining crew of the brig Ann, which had foundered. Ever since its founding in 1824, the Royal National Institution for the Preservation of Life from Shipwreck (RNIPLS), later to become the RNLI in 1854, would award medals for deeds of gallantry at sea, even if no lifeboats were involved. Three of the rescuers were awarded the RNIPLS Silver Medal.

During the 1800s, a chain of lifeboat stations was gradually being created along the shores of the Firth of Clyde, the primary shipping route to the industrial centre of Glasgow. Stations included Ayr (1803), Ardrossan (1807), Irvine (1834), Campbeltown (1861), Girvan (1865) and Kildonan (1870).

It was suggested that an additional lifeboat be placed at the port town of Troon, and with local support forthcoming, this was agreed. A boathouse was constructed at a cost of £254-5s, reported to be on a site in the town on Portland Street, granted by the landowner, The Duke of Portland.

A 32-foot (9.8 m) 'Pulling and Sailing' (P&S) lifeboat, one with sails and (10) oars, double banked, was constructed by Forrestt of Limehouse, London in 1870. Funded by Mrs Sinclair of Greenock, and named Mary Sinclair in memory of her late daughter, the lifeboat was first dispatched to Greenock in 1871, where it was exhibited for two days in Clyde Square. It was then taken to Troon, and drawn through the town in grand procession, before being publicly launched at the new station. Each leg of the journey from Carlisle to Troon via Greenock was granted free of charge by the Glasgow and South-Western Railway.

In 1904, after operating two other progressively larger lifeboats, a 38-foot Watson (P&S) non-self-righting lifeboat was sent to the station. With lifeboats already proving a struggle to launch from the town location, and the new boat at least 1 ft (0.30 m) longer and wider than any previous lifeboat at Troon, it was decided that the new boat should remain afloat. The boathouse was sold to the local council in 1905, and the Troon lifeboat has been kept afloat ever since.

Following the sale of the boat shed, Troon lifeboat 'station' was first situated underneath the old sail-loft, beyond the harbour buildings. However, by the 1950s, a station building existed where the current one stands. In 1987, timed to coincide with the arrival of the new Arun-class All-weather lifeboat, 52–38 City of Glasgow III (ON 1134), a new station was constructed to provide a workshop and store, a fuel store, a crewroom and toilet facilities. Remedial dredging around the berth was required to accommodate the lifeboat. Further works were carried out in 1996, with the construction of an extension, to provide a improved workshop, a souvenir shop, and a crew room with galley on the first floor.

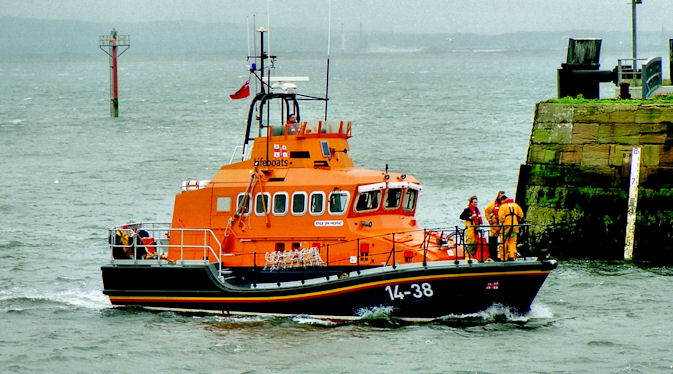
Trent-class lifeboat 14-38 Jim Moffat (ON 1275)

It was decided to add a D-class (EA16) Inshore lifeboat to the fleet at Troon in January 2004. It was swiftly followed by the arrival on 18 February, of a Trent-class All-weather lifeboat. The new boat, 14-38 Jim Moffat (ON 1275), costing £1.4m, was the last of 38 lifeboats of the class to be built, and was funded by gifts received from the Moffat Charitable Trust, the Miss I F Harvey Charitable Trust, Mr A Boyd Tunnock, MBE, and funds raised through "The Lifeboats of the Clyde Appeal 2004". A boathouse was constructed for the D-class, and the station equipped with a davit for launching in the harbour, all completed in September 2004, at a cost of £51,327.

Funded by the proceeds of public collections and shopkeepers at Telford shopping centre, the new D-class (IB1) lifeboat placed at Troon on 19 December 2007 was named Telford Shopping Centre (D-684).

In 2025, the Trent-class lifeboat was withdrawn from service. She was replaced by a brand new £2.7m Shannon-class All-weather lifeboat, 13-55 Roy Barker VI (ON 1362). More than thirty years after the RNLI received the largest ever bequest of £6.5m in 1993, from the late Mr Roy Barker, an agricultural business man, the fund is still providing new lifeboats. Additional funding was provided from the legacy of Mr Alan Lionel Aspinall.

== Service awards ==
Three RNLI Medals have been awarded to members of Troon lifeboat. The first two were for the rescue of seven people from the Belfast steamer Moyallen on 6 December 1940. It was a difficult rescue amid a gale and rain. Coxswain William McAuslane was awarded the RNLI Silver Medal, with Mechanic Albert John Ferguson receiving the RNLI Bronze Medal. The RNLI silver medal was awarded to coxswain/mechanic Ian Johnson, who took the lifeboat to rescue five people from a dredger on 12 September 1980, which was in danger of breaking its moorings outside the harbour, in a Force 10 storm.

The 'Thanks of the Institution inscribed on Vellum' was accorded to Acting Coxswain Thomas Devenny, who led a mission to rescue the crew of a small fishing boat during a storm on 18 October 1984. The same award was given to David Seaward and Paul Aspin, who used the All-weather lifeboat's (ALB's) daughter boat to rescue 10 people from the TS Mountbatten which ran aground at Ayr on 14 July 1988. Ian Johnson, the ALB's coxswain on the day, received a 'Framed Letter of Thanks' from the chairman. Coxswain Colin Millar was awarded the 'Thanks of the Institution inscribed on Vellum', after leading the lifeboat in a difficult rescue of a trawler on 14 January 2015.

On 8 December 1979 Roy Trewern used the lifeboat's inflatable dinghy to help two people cut off by a rising tide, for which he received a 'Framed Letter of Thanks from the Chairman of the Institution'. Coxswain Ian Johnson and the whole crew received a 'Collective Framed Letter of Thanks' for saving a broken down yacht and four people near Holy Isle on 23 May 1992.

== Station honours ==
The following are awards made at Troon:

- RNIPLS Silver Medal
  William McDonald, Master Mariner – 1834
  Robert Orr, Master Mariner – 1834
  John Peebles, Master Mariner – 1834
- RNLI Silver Medal
  William McAuslane, Coxswain – 1941
  Ian Johnson, Coxswain/Mechanic – 1980
- RNLI Bronze Medal
  Albert John Ferguson, Mechanic – 1941
- 'The Thanks of the Institution inscribed on Vellum'
  Thomas Laurence Devenny, Acting Coxswain/Assistant Mechanic – 1985
  David Seaward, Emergency Mechanic – 1989
  Paul Aspin, crew member – 1989
  Colin (Joe) Millar, Coxswain – 2016
- 'A Framed Letter of Thanks signed by the Chairman of the Institution'
  Roy Trewern, crew member – 1980
  Ian Johnson, Coxswain/Mechanic – 1989
  Trevor Boyes, crew member – 2016
  Allan Craig, crew member – 2016
  Paul Moeledge, crew member – 2016
- 'A Collective Framed Letter of Thanks signed by the Chairman of the Institution'
  Ian Johnson, Coxswain/Mechanic – 1993
  William Arnold, Second Coxswain/Assistant Mechanic – 1993
  Stephen Aspin, Deputy Second Coxswain – 1993
  Charles Davies, crew member – 1993
  William Fergusson, crew member – 1993
  Brian Hannah, crew member – 1993
  Brian Hedges, crew member – 1993
  J. Millar, crew member – 1993
- Member, Order of the British Empire (MBE)
  James Manson, Honorary Secretary – 2000QBH

== Roll of honour ==
In memory of those lost whilst serving at Troon:

- Died in 1931, from the effects of exposure suffered during the passage of the new lifeboat Sir David Richmond of Glasgow to station in 1929.
  Thomas Warren, Bowman
- Collapsed and died whilst on exercise, 1949
  John McCaull, Second Coxswain

== Troon lifeboats ==
=== Pulling and Sailing (P&S) lifeboats ===
On station	ON (Note: ON is the RNLI's Official Number of the boat.)	Name	Built	Class	Comments
1871–1886	Pre-549	Mary Sinclair	1870	32-foot Prowse self-righting (P&S)	(Note: 32 ft 0 in (9.75 m) x 7 ft 6 in (2.29 m) (10-oared) Prowse-class self-righting (P&S) lifeboat, gift of Mrs Sinclair of Greenock, built by Forrestt of Limehouse, London, costing £285.); Sold in 1887 and broken up.
1886–1899	88	Alexander Munnoch	1886	34-foot self-righting (P&S)	(Note: 34 ft 0 in (10.36 m) x 7 ft 6 in (2.29 m) (10-oared) self-righting (P&S) lifeboat, legacy of Mr Alexander Munnoch of Cringate, South Lodge, Stirling, built by Forrestt of Limehouse, London, costing £295.); Sold in 1899.
1899–1904	309	Charles Skirrow	1891	37-foot self-righting (P&S)	(Note: 37 ft 0 in (11.28 m) x 8 ft 0 in (2.44 m) (12-oared) self-righting (P&S) lifeboat, gift of Mrs Skirrow of Hyde Park, built by Forrestt of Limehouse, London, costing £537.); Previously at Ardrossan. Sold in 1904. Renamed Orion, later Oriana. Last reported at Heybridge in 1973.
1904–1929	525	Busbie	1904	38-foot Watson (P&S)	(Note: 38 ft 0 in (11.58 m) x 9 ft 4 in (2.84 m) (12-oared) Watson-class non-self-righting lifeboat, legacy of Mr H. R. C. Wallace of Busbie and Cloncaird, built by Thames Ironworks of Blackwall, London, costing £1,584.); Sold in 1930.

Pre ON numbers are unofficial numbers used by the Lifeboat Enthusiasts' Society to reference early lifeboats not included on the official RNLI list.

=== Motor lifeboats ===
On station	ON	Op.No. (Note: Op.No. is the RNLI's Operational Number of the boat carried on the hull.)	Name	Built	Class	Comments
1929–1955	723	—	Sir David Richmond of Glasgow	1929	40-foot 6in Watson	Sold in 1955. Last reported as the fishing boat AB52 Aber Girl at Aberystwyth, June 1973
1955–1967	909	—	James and Barbara Aitken	1954	42-foot Watson	Transferred to Girvan.
1968–1985	1006	44-007	Connel Elizabeth Cargill	1967	Waveney	Transferred to Arklow.
1985–1987	1029	44-011	Augustine Courtauld	1974	Waveney	Lifeboat from the relief fleet. Originally deployed to Poole.
1987–2004	1134	52–38	City of Glasgow III	1987	Arun	Sold in 2005 for continued lifeboat service at Vopnafjörður, Iceland, December 2025
2004–2025	1275	14-38	Jim Moffat	2003	Trent	
2025–	1362	13-55	Roy Barker VI	2025	Shannon	

More post-service details can be found on the respective lifeboat class pages.

=== Inshore lifeboats ===
On station	Op.No.	Name	Class	Comments
2004–2005	D-468	Colin Martin	D-class (EA16)	First stationed at Happisburgh in 1994.
2006–2007	D-506	Patrick Rex Moren	D-class (EA16)	First stationed at Mablethorpe in 1996.
2007–2018	D-684	Telford Shopping Centre	D-class (IB1)	
2018–	D-821	Sheena	D-class (IB1)	

== See also ==
- List of RNLI stations
- List of former RNLI stations
- Royal National Lifeboat Institution lifeboats
