= Kildonan Lifeboat Station =

Former RNLI Lifeboat station in North Ayrshire, Scotland

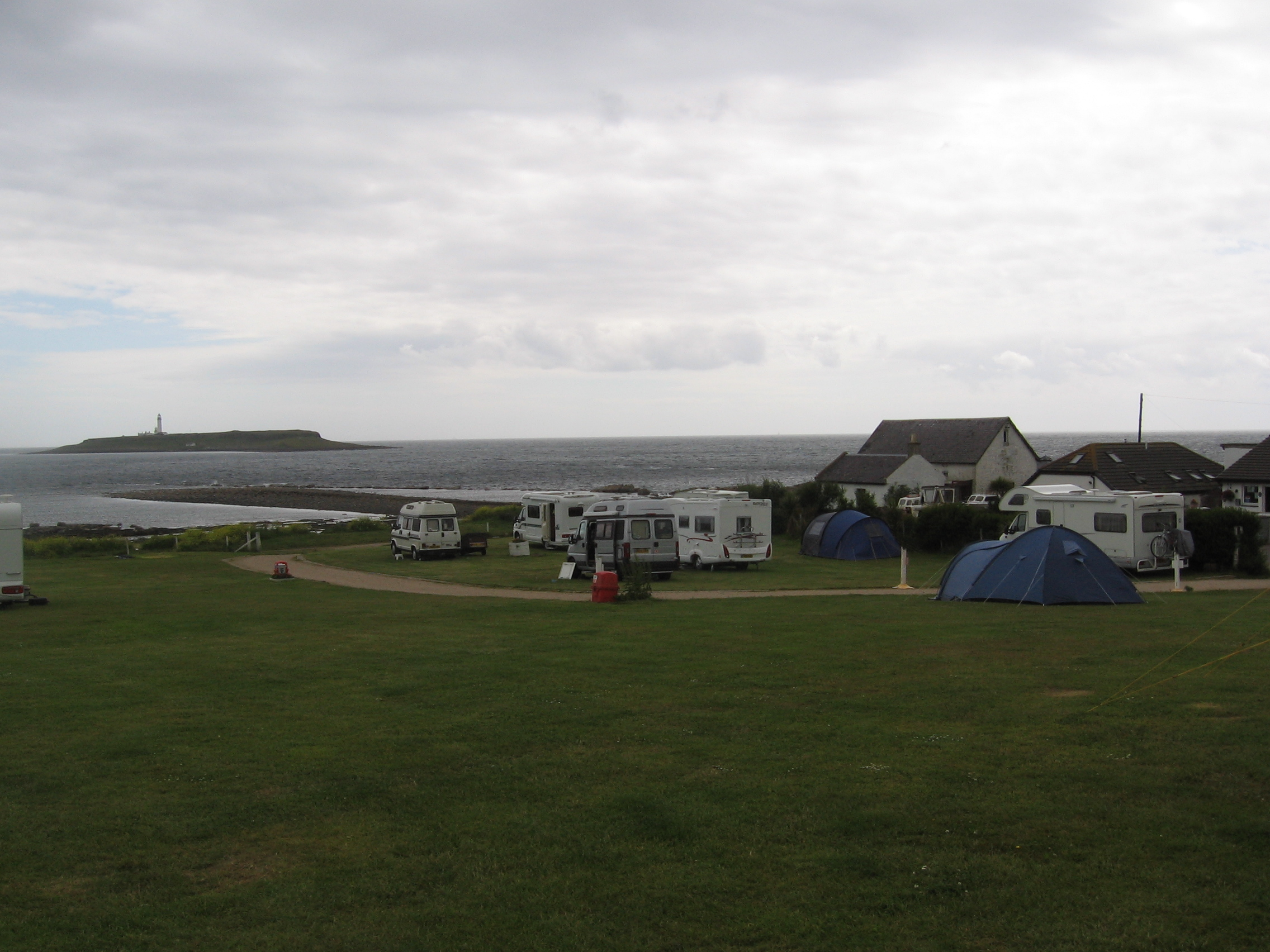
- Kildonan Lifeboat Station in the background

- Location within Arran

General information
- Status: Closed
- Type: RNLI Lifeboat Station
- Location: Kildonan, Isle of Arran, Strathclyde, KA27 8SD, Scotland
- Coordinates: 55°26′27.5″N 5°06′51.5″W
- Opened: 1870
- Closed: 1902
- Owner: Kildonan Hotel

Kildonan Lifeboat Station was located in the village of Kildonan, on the south-east coast of the Isle of Arran, overlooking Pladda Lighthouse, in the Firth of Clyde, formerly in Buteshire, now in the administrative region of North Ayrshire in Scotland.

A lifeboat was first stationed on the Isle of Arran in 1870, by the Royal National Lifeboat Institution (RNLI).

After operating for 32 years, Kildonan Lifeboat Station closed in 1902.

== History ==
In the late 1860s, it was decided that a lifeboat station be established on the Isle of Arran, on the west coast of Scotland. "The life-boat is stationed at Kildonan, where a very heavy sea is encountered, to meet any contingencies that might arise amongst the large number of passenger and trading vessels that are constantly passing the Isle on their voyages to and from the Clyde."

A boathouse was constructed on the beach at Kildonan, at a cost of £201, and a 32-foot 10-oared self-righting 'Pulling and Sailing' (P&S) lifeboat, one with oars and sails, and costing £247-9s, was sent to the station. The lifeboat and launch carriage were transported to Ardrossan in early May 1870, by both the London and North Western, and Glasgow and South Western railway companies, the latter providing their services for free.

In the charge of Capt. D. Robertson, RN., Assistant Inspector of Lifeboats, the carriage and equipment were loaded aboard a steamship, and the lifeboat was towed over to Lamlash. The new crew were said to be very pleased with the boat when it was trialled on the 6th and 7th of May. The lifeboat had been funded by a donation of £1000 from an anonymous 'English Lady' from Berkshire, and was named Hope at her request.

Kildonan lifeboat Hope was launched on 11 February 1877, to the aid of the barque Queen of Hearts, driven ashore at Slattery Rocks, whilst on passage from the Clyde to the United States. It was found that the majority of the crew had got ashore in the ship's boat, but one man was landed by the lifeboat. The Master and two mates remained aboard, and the vessel was later refloated and taken to Greenock.

Hope was launched at 23:00 on 13 July 1879, to the aid of the pilot smack Marion, which had lost her jib, and was stranded on Carlin Rock. Two men were brought ashore.

It was announced in 1877, that the late Mrs. Emily Dewar of Vogrie, from the Dewar's whisky family, had bequeathed £500 to the RNLI for a lifeboat. The money was appropriated to Kildonan Lifeboat, with the lifeboat being renamed Emily Dewar sometime around 1880.

On 6 October 1885, the barque Rimac was seen flying the distress signal "I am sinking". The vessel bound for Valparaíso, Chile, with a crew of 17, had only just left Glasgow. Lifeboat Emily Dewar was launched just after 18:00, and found the vessel had been in collision with the ship North. The lifeboat crew went aboard, and with the help of a tugboat, brought the vessel to Lamlash, where she was beached. The lifeboat remained on scene until low-water, returning home at 07:00 the following morning.

The barque Falco of Stockholm was seen aground on Carline Rocks on 7 December 1887. The vessel had sprung a leak, and was deliberately run ashore. Seven men were brought to safety by the lifeboat Emily Dewar.

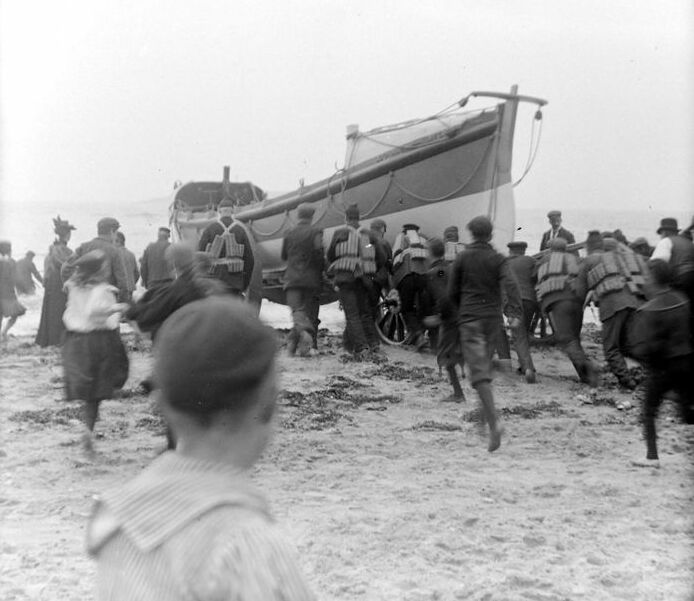
Launching the Lifeboat at Kildonan Arran, 1897

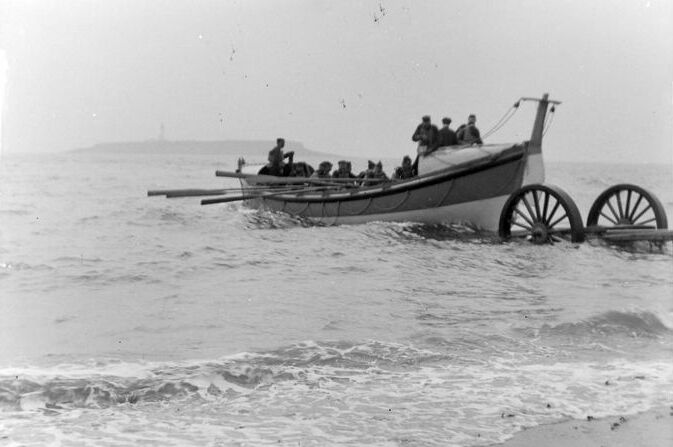
Kildonan Lifeboat David and Elizabeth Kidd, Brother and Sister (ON 290)

A new slightly larger 34-foot lifeboat was placed at Kildonan in 1890. It was reported that the Institution was "indebited to an old friend and former lifeboat donor", Miss Pringle Kidd, of Lasswade Bank, Edinburgh, later Glenternie House, who provided the lifeboat with a donation of £700, with enough money remaining for a new launch carriage, along with refurbishment of the boathouse. Miss Pringle Kidd was one of the two sisters of David Kidd, who is listed as a Stationer in the 1870–71 Edinburgh directory, but in fact was a wholesale stationer in Fleet Street, and inventor of the modern gummed envelope. She had previously funded a lifeboat for Irvine in 1861. At a ceremony on 26 August 1890, the new Kildonan lifeboat was named David and Elizabeth Kidd, Brother and Sister (ON 290), after her late brother and sister.

The lack of service reports after 1890 indicates a good reduction in the number of vessels in distress, a common factor of the period, with more motor-powered vessels, fewer sailing vessels, and better navigational aids. The RNLI reported in 1902, that "within the year, three stations were closed due to changes in local requirements, rendering it unnecessary that they should any longer be retained". These were Llanaelhaearn (Caernarfonshire), Rye (Sussex), and Kildonan. Kildonan Lifeboat Station closed in 1901.

The lifeboat house remains to this day, and is now part of the Kildonan Hotel. The lifeboat on station at the time of closure, David and Elizabeth Kidd, Brother and Sister (ON 290) was sold from service in 1902. No further details of the lifeboat are known.

In 1970, the RNLI established Arran Lifeboat Station on the east side of the Isle, at Lamlash, initially operating a D-class (RFD PB16) Inshore lifeboat. The station currently operates the larger B-class (Atlantic 85) Inshore lifeboat.

== Kildonan lifeboats ==
=== Pulling and Sailing (P&S) lifeboats ===
| ON (Note: ON is the RNLI's Official Number of the boat.) | Name | Built | On station | Class | Comments |
|---|---|---|---|---|---|
| Pre-547 | Hope | 1870 | 1870–1881 | 32-foot Prowse Self-righting (P&S) | (Note: 32-foot x 7-foot 5in (10-oared) Prowse-class self-righting (P&S) lifeboat, gift of Miss M. Wasey of Newbury, Berkshire, built by Woolfe of Shadwell, London, costing £247.); Renamed Emily Dewar in 1881 |
| Pre-547 | Emily Dewar | 1870 | 1881–1890 | 32-foot Prowse Self-righting (P&S) | (Note: Legacy of Mrs Dewar of Edinburgh.) |
| 290 | David and Elizabeth Kidd, Brother and Sister | 1890 | 1890–1902 | 34-foot Self-righting (P&S) | (Note: 34-foot x 7-foot 6in (10-oared) self-righting (P&S) lifeboat, gift of Miss Pringle Kidd of Dalkeith, built by Woolfe of Shadwell, London, costing £450.) |

Pre ON numbers are unofficial numbers used by the Lifeboat Enthusiast Society to reference early lifeboats not included on the official RNLI list.

== See also ==
- List of RNLI stations
- List of former RNLI stations
- Royal National Lifeboat Institution lifeboats
