= Irvine Lifeboat Station =

Former RNLI lifeboat station in North Ayrshire, Scotland

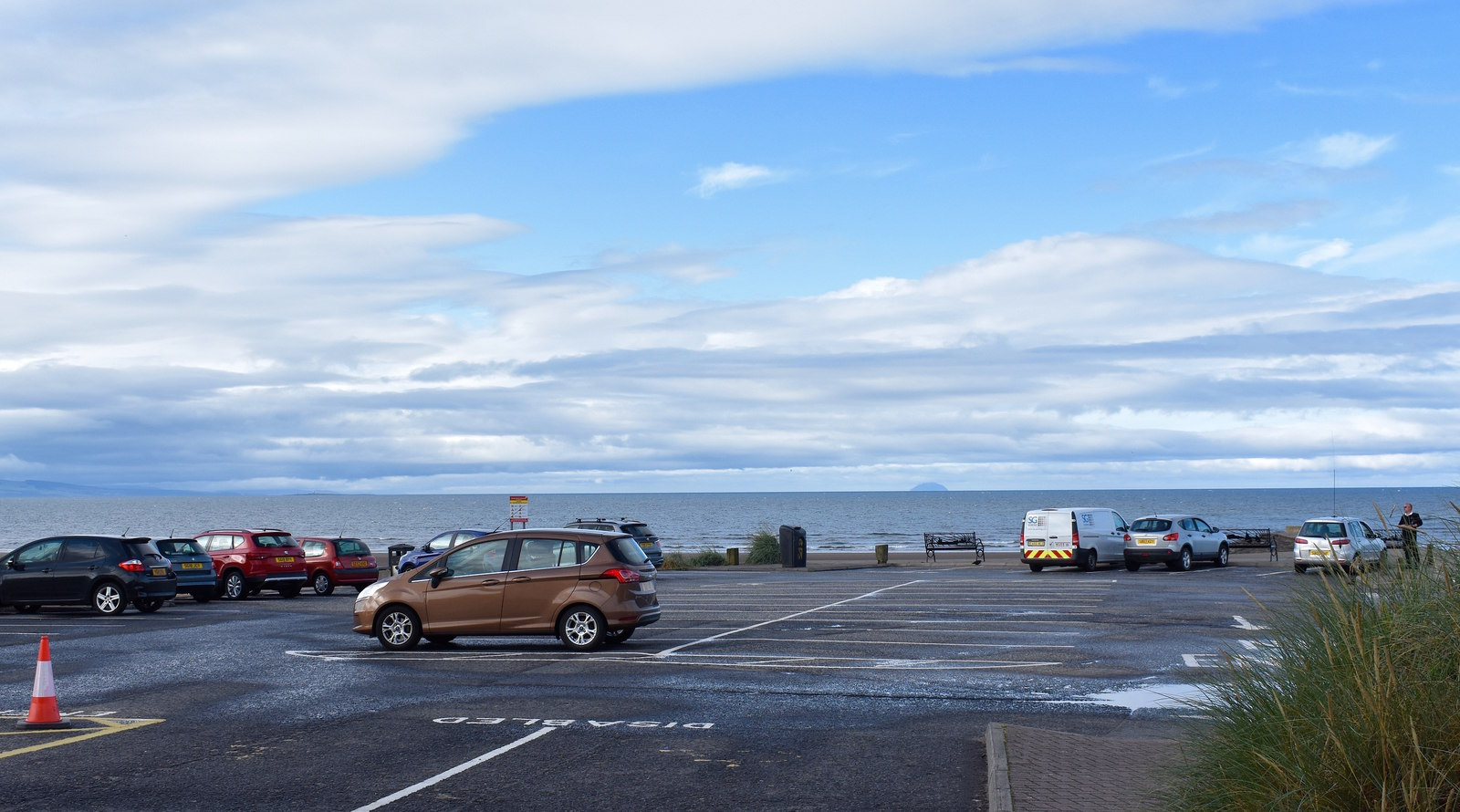
- Site of Irvine Lifeboat Station

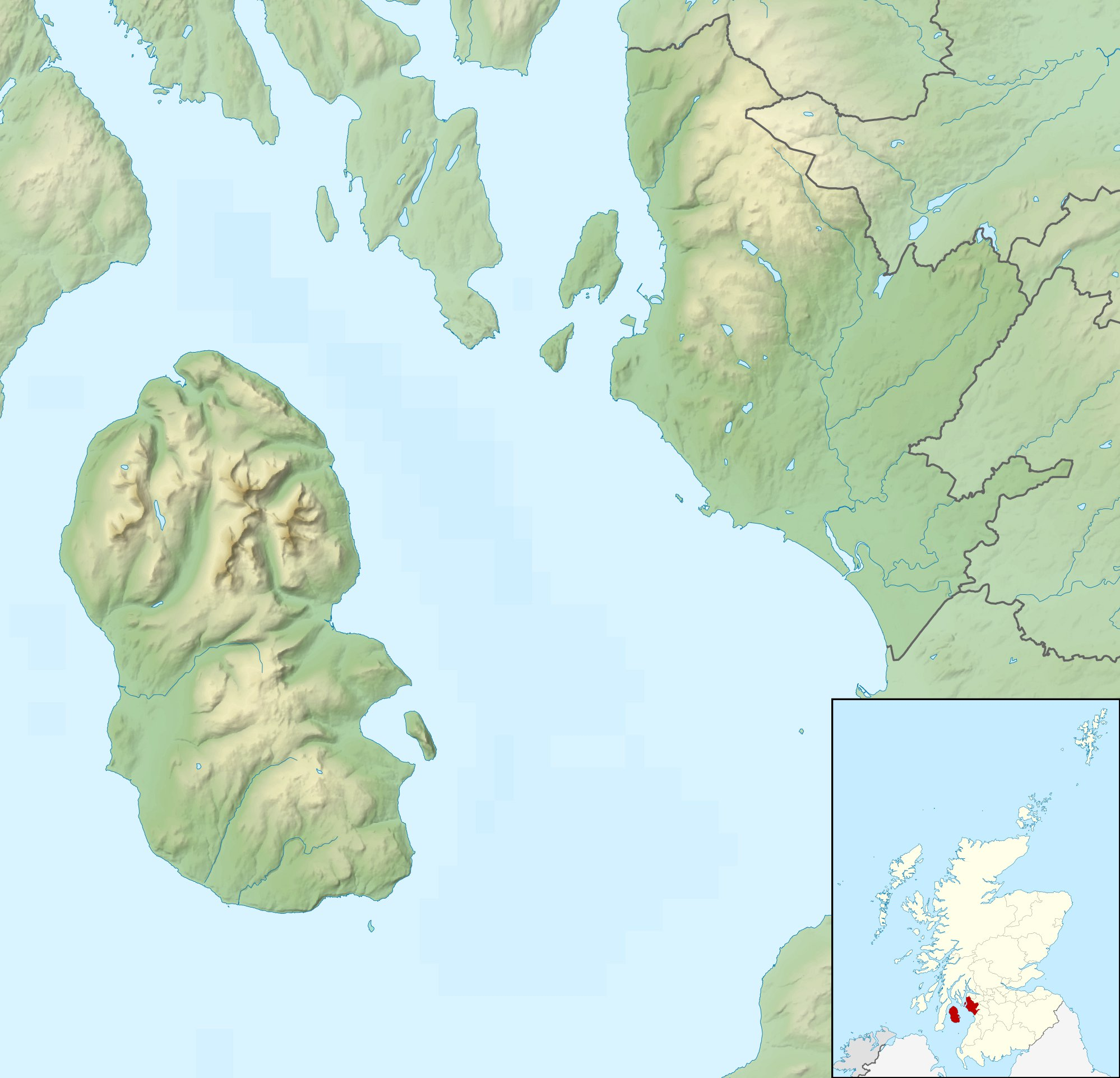
- Irvine, North Ayrshire

General information
- Status: Closed
- Type: RNLI Lifeboat Station
- Location: Irvine Beach Car Park, Irvine, North Ayrshire, KA12 8PP, Scotland
- Coordinates: 55°36′16.9″N 4°41′40.4″W
- Opened: 1861
- Closed: 1914

Irvine Lifeboat Station was located next to Irvine Beach breakwater, at the mouth of the River Irvine, in Irvine, a harbour town and former royal burgh overlooking the Firth of Clyde and the Isle of Arran, in the county of North Ayrshire, historically Ayrshire, on the south-west coast of Scotland.

A lifeboat was first stationed at Irvine in 1834, by the Irvine Harbour Commissioners. Management of the station transferred to the Royal National Lifeboat Institution (RNLI) in 1860.

After 80 years service, Irvine Lifeboat Station closed in 1914.

== History ==
Ever since its founding in 1824, the Royal National Institution for the Preservation of Life from Shipwreck (RNIPLS), later to become the RNLI in 1854, would award medals for deeds of gallantry at sea, even if no lifeboats were involved.

When the schooner Margaret Young of Belfast ran aground in Irvine Bay on 25 August 1850, the Earl of Errol was launched, and rescued the Master, Mate, one boy and a passenger. Capt. Thomas Peebles of the Earl of Errol was awarded the RNIPLS Silver Medal.

A lifeboat had been operated at Irvine by the Irvine Harbour Commissioners since 1834. At a meeting of the RNLI committee of management on Thursday 1 November 1860, after making note of the report of the Inspector of Lifeboats, and also that the Irvine harbour Commissioners had accepted the offer of the Institution – to place a new lifeboat at Irvine, under the agreement that they would assist with the upkeep of the establishment – it was resolved that a lifeboat and carriage would be placed at Irvine.

It was reported in the RNLI journal 'The Lifeboat' of 1 July 1861, that a 30-foot self-righting 'Pulling and Sailing' (P&S) lifeboat, one with sails and (6) oars, single banked, and costing £157, along with a launch carriage and all equipment, had been sent to Irvine in May 1861. Thanks were offered to the railway companies who had transported all to Irvine free of charge.

The cost of the lifeboat had been funded from the donation of £180 from Miss Pringle Kidd of Lasswade Bank, Edinburgh, later at Glenternie House near Peebles, a sister of the late David Kidd of Leyton in Essex, a wholesale stationer in Fleet Street, and the inventor of the modern gummed envelope. The lifeboat was duly named in her honour.

On 10 February 1868, the barque Kate Agnes of Saint John, New Brunswick, was driven ashore at Irvine, whilst on passage from Dublin to Troon. The Irvine lifeboat Pringle Kidd was launched, and in two trips, rescued 14 people on board.

In 1874, it was reported that the Irvine lifeboat Pringle Kidd was unfit for service and was withdrawn. The RNLI then took the opportunity to refurbish the Irvine station. Having previously used the old boathouse used by the Harbour Commissioners, a new boathouse was constructed next to the Irvine beach breakwater,at a cost of £307-9s and a new 33-foot self-righting lifeboat, costing a further £286-8s, was dispatched to the station, along with a new carriage and set of equipment.

On the 17 October 1874, the lifeboat and carriage was drawn through the town in procession by eight horses, after which it was formally named Isabella Frew. The whole expense was borne by the gift of Mr William Sommerville, a Paper Mill owner of Penicuik and Bitton, son-in-law of Mr William Frew of Irvine, and the lifeboat was named in his wife's maiden name, Isabella (Robertson) Frew.

There are only two recorded services for the Isabella Frew. On 6 October 1876, 4 were rescued from the Lady Mary on Irvine, the schooner having been driven ashore at the harbour entrance. Another 4 were rescued from the Steam tug Irvine, when she ran grounded on the center of the Irvine Bar on 20 December 1882.

The third boat to be placed at Irvine was the 34-foot self-righting lifeboat Busbie (ON 168) in 1887. The lifeboat was provided from the legacy of Henry Ritchie Cooper Wallace of Busbie and Cloncaird. The Busbie recorded 33 lives saved in just 4 services between 1887 and 1898. The boat was replaced in 1898 by a 37-foot Self-righting (P&S) lifeboat, built by Thames Ironworks of Blackwall, London. The lifeboat was funded from the bequest of the late Mr. George Pike Nicholls, of Southgate, Middlesex, and was named in memory of his late mother, Jane Anne (ON 417).

== Notable Rescues ==
In hurricane conditions blowing from the north-west on 29 December 1894, the Irvine lifeboat Busbie was launched to the aid of the Norwegian ship Frey, in distress near Lady Isle, off Troon harbour. In the conditions, it had been impossible to get the Troon lifeboat out of the harbour, but in full-sail, the Irvine lifeboat arrived in 30 minutes. On arrival, 16 crewmen of the Frey jumped into the water, and were hauled into the lifeboat one-by-one. Opting to land at Troon, the lifeboat was near the beach, when it was overwhelmed by large waves, and the Coxswain and 3 or 4 others were swept out of the boat. When the lifeboat self-righted, all regained the boat, except one Norwegian who had been swept away. 70-year-old Coxswain David Sinclair was awarded the RNLI Silver Medal.

== Closure ==
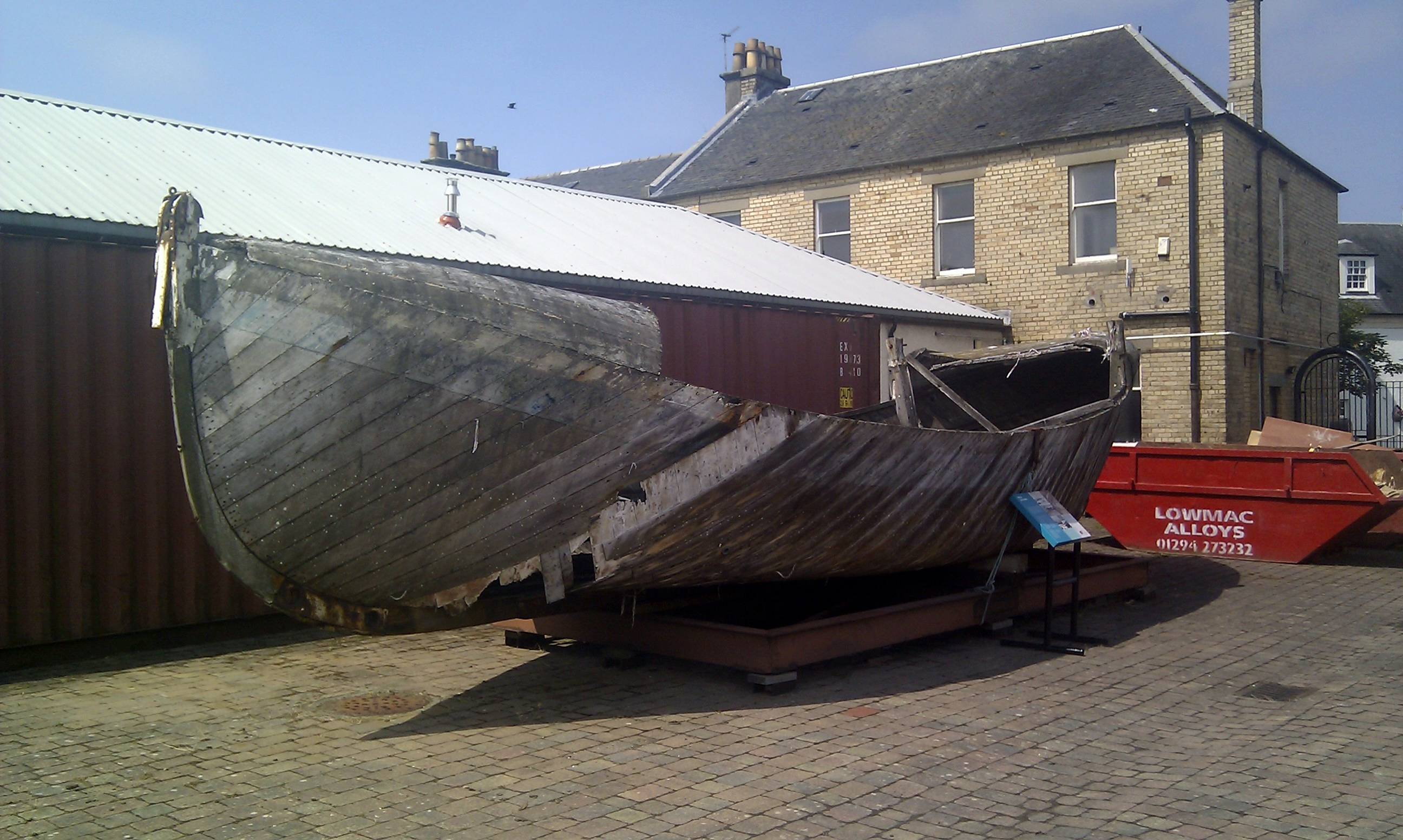
RNLB Jane Anne (ON 417)

With lifeboats still at the flanking stations of Ayr, Troon and Ardrossan, and following the report of the Deputy Chief Inspector of Lifeboats, at a meeting of the RNLI committee of management on Thursday 2 April 1914, the decision was taken to close Irvine Lifeboat Station.

No evidence remains of the RNLI lifeboat house, which had been located on the current site of Irvine Beach car park. The lifeboat on station at the time of closure, Jane Anne (ON 417) was transferred to the relief fleet, later to serve at Falmouth, before being sold out of service in September 1928, at auction to Mr E. F. Cooper for £35. Found rotting in a field in Somerset in the 1980s, the boat was acquired by the Scottish Maritime Museum at Irvine, where she remains on display, as found. The lifeboat service boards are preserved at the Wellwood Burns Center and Museum in Irvine.

== Station honours ==
The following are awards made at Irvine.

- RNIPLS Silver Medal

Thomas Peebles, Capt. of the Earl of Errol – 1850

- RNLI Silver Medal

David Sinclair, Coxswain – 1895

== Irvine lifeboats ==
=== Pulling and Sailing (P&S) lifeboats ===
ON (Note: ON is the RNLI's Official Number of the boat.)	Name	Built	On station	Class	Comments
–	Unnamed	1834	1834−1860	26-foot 3in North Country Non-self-righting	(Note: 26-foot 3in x 7-foot 11in (12-oared) North Country non-self-righting lifeboat, funded by local subscription and a donation from the RNIPLS, manufacturer unknown.)
Pre-373	Pringle Kidd	1860	1861−1874	30-foot Peake Self-righting (P&S)	(Note: 30-foot x 7-foot (6-oared) Peake-class self-righting (P&S) lifeboat, gift of Miss P. Kidd of Lasswade Bank, Edinburgh, built by Forrestt of Limehouse, London, costing £157.)
Pre-584	Isabella Frew	1874	1874−1887	33-foot Peake Self-righting (P&S)	(Note: 33-foot x 7-foot 6in (10-oared) Peake-class self-righting (P&S) lifeboat, gift of Mr W. Sommerville of Bitton, Gloucestershire, built by Woolfe of Shadwell, London, costing £286.)
168	Busbie	1887	1887−1898	34-foot Self-righting (P&S)	(Note: 34-foot x 7-foot 6in (10-oared) self-righting (P&S) lifeboat, legacy of Mr H. C. R. Wallace of Busbie and Cloncaird, built by Woolfe of Shadwell, London, costing costing £336.)
417	Jane Anne	1898	1898−1914	37-foot Self-righting (P&S)	(Note: 37-foot self-righting x 9-foot 3in (10-oared) self-righting (P&S) lifeboat, legacy of Mr G. P. Nicholls of Southcote, built by Thames Ironworks of Blackwall, London, costing £681.)

Pre ON numbers are unofficial numbers used by the Lifeboat Enthusiast Society to reference early lifeboats not included on the official RNLI list.

== See also ==
- List of RNLI stations
- List of former RNLI stations
- Royal National Lifeboat Institution lifeboats
