= William Rae Arthur =

The Hon. William Rae Arthur was a 19th-century Scottish businessman who served as Lord Provost of Glasgow from 1869 to 1871.

== Life ==
In 1850 he was Director of Muir Brown & Co based ar 296 St Vincent St.

He was a director of A & W Arthur, a warehouse company in Glasgow. He lived at 20 Buccleuch Street in the city.

In 1869 he succeeded Sir James Lumsden as Lord Provost of Glasgow. He was succeeded in turn in 1871 by Sir James Watson.

On 18 February 1871 he is recorded as officially sanctioning the new Glasgow Royal Infirmary.

In 1880 he is listed as a Director of Muir Brown & Co and was living at 1 Crown Gardens in Dowanhill.

In 1873 he is listed as a Freemason.

His daughter Isobel McRae Arthur married Charles Ralph Dubs (1850-1903), son of Henry Dubs. She remarried Lieutenant-Colonel Hugh Robert Wallace in 1908, of Cloncaird Castle.
