= Rye Harbour Lifeboat Station =

RNLI Lifeboat station in East Sussex, England

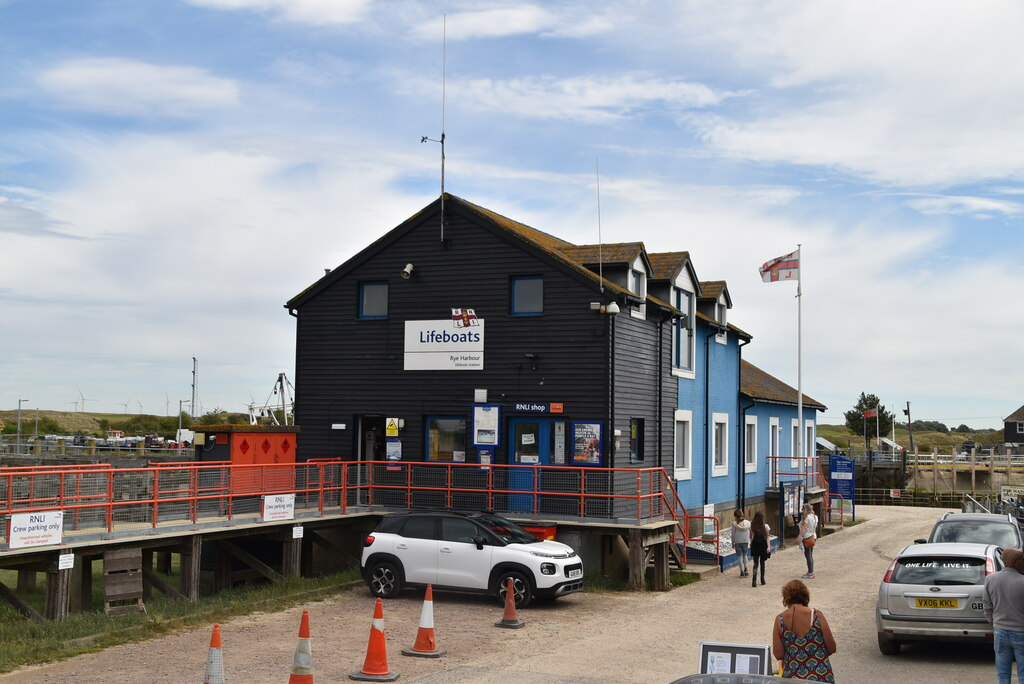
- Rye Harbour Lifeboat Station

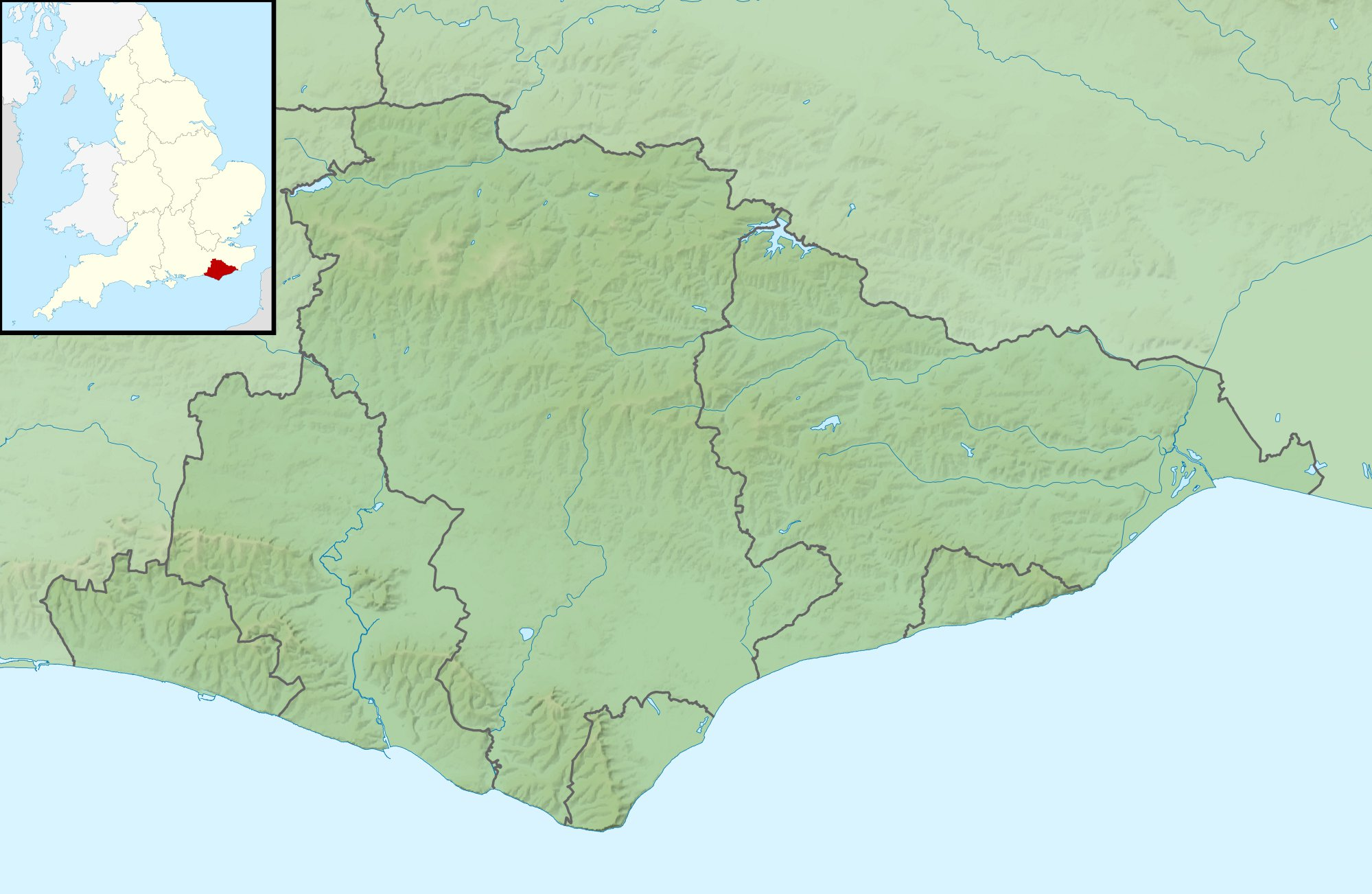
- Location within East Sussex
- Former names: Winchelsea Lifeboat Station

General information
- Type: RNLI Lifeboat Station
- Location: Harbour Road, Rye Harbour, East Sussex, TN31 7TU, England
- Coordinates: 50°56′18.5″N 0°45′50.9″E
- Opened: 1803–1928; RNLI ILB 1966
- Owner: Royal National Lifeboat Institution

Website
- Rye Harbour RNLI Lifeboat Station

Rye Harbour Lifeboat Station is located at the end of Harbour Road, on the west bank of the River Rother estuary, in the village of Rye Harbour, in the county of East Sussex.

A lifeboat first operated from Martello Tower No.31 at Dogs Hill, Winchelsea, from 1803. Operations of the station, known at the time as Rye Lifeboat Station, were transferred to the management of the Royal National Institution for the Preservation of Life from Shipwreck (RNIPLS) in 1832, the Institution later becoming the Royal National Lifeboat Institution (RNLI) in 1854.

The station currently operates a B-class (Atlantic 85) Inshore lifeboat, Hello Herbie II (B-900), on station since 2017.

== History ==
Rye Lifeboat Station dates back to 1803, when a Henry Greathead lifeboat was placed at the coastguard station at Martello Tower No.31, at Dogs Hill, Winchelsea. No further details are available.

In 1832, operations were transferred to the management of the Royal National Institution for the Preservation of Life from Shipwreck (RNIPLS) in 1833. A new 25-foot (6-oared) lifeboat, designed by Palmer, was built by Harton of Limehouse, London, at a cost of £59, was placed at the station.

On 23 January 1834, the brig Conrad, on passage from Batavia to Rotterdam, was wrecked near Rye, East Sussex. Four of the crew drowned. The vessel broke up, and washed ashore, but the Master and seven more crew were rescued by the coastguard. Lt. Richard Morgan and Lt. John Somerville were each awarded the RNIPLS Silver Medal.

A new branch of the RNLI was established at Rye in 1856, and a new boathouse costing £93-8s-5d was constructed by local residents, to the west of Rye Harbour, close to Winchelsea Coastguard Station, midway between the River Rother estuary, and Martello Tower 31. A two-year-old 27-foot x 7-foot 6in (8-oared) Peake-class self-righting (P&S) lifeboat, one with oars and sails, was transferred to Rye from Dungeness, having been found too heavy for the previous location.

Camber Lifeboat Station, a second station under the management of the Rye branch, was established just to the east at Camber, East Sussex in 1857.

In 1862, a 30-foot self-righting lifeboat was transferred to Rye from Winterton. Comparing the RNLI Annual Reports, between 1862 and 1863, it was decided to rename Rye Lifeboat Station as Winchelsea Lifeboat Station, and to confuse matters, Camber Lifeboat Station was renamed Rye Lifeboat Station.

On 13 February 1864, William C. Buck, Chief Officer, H.M. Coastguard, was awarded the RNLI Silver Medal, for the rescue of just one man, the Master, of the five crew of the fishing boat Thetis, but this was at the cost of coastguard man, George Terry, who was lost during the rescue.

The first lifeboat would be replaced after just five years, in 1867, with a larger 33-foot boat, after a request from the station. The cost of the lifeboat was defrayed, via Mr Frederick Ouvry and Mr W. M. Wilkinson, by the gift of £350 from the Solicitors and Proctors Lifeboat Fund. The new lifeboat and carriage were conveyed to their station free of charge, by the South Eastern Railway Company, who also returned the old boat and carriage to London, again free of charge. As per the wishes of the subscribers, the lifeboat was named Storm Sprite.

Soon after 18:45 on 22 December 1877, the Storm Sprite was launched to the aid of the schooner Vier Broders, on passage from Groningen to Portsmouth, when she stranded in low water and later broke up. Four crew were rescued from the rigging.

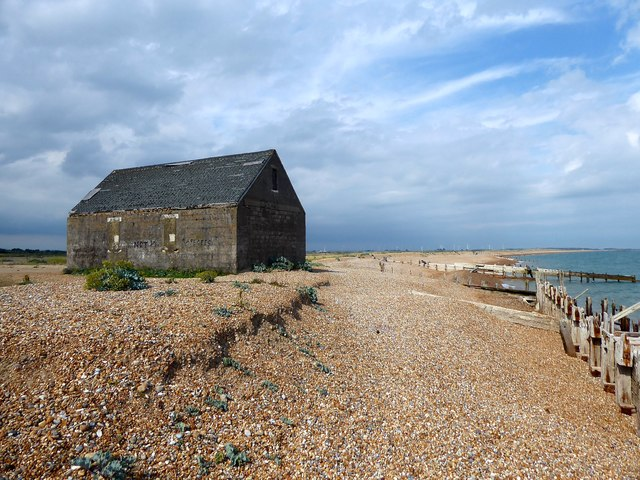
1882 Lifeboat House

In 1882, a new lifeboat house was constructed by a local builder, Mr M. Anne, on the shore at Winchelsea, at a cost of £245. Built of pre-cast "no-fines" shingle based concrete, it was funded from RNLI donations.

Both the Rye and Winchelsea lifeboats were launched to the aid of the steamship Medea on 4 November 1882. 16 crew were taken off the Medea by the Rye lifeboat. The Winchelsea lifeboat was capsized twice during her rescue attempts, and lifeboat man Edward Robus was swept away and drowned.

In 1901, Rye Lifeboat Station was closed. Winchelsea lifeboat station was renamed Rye Harbour Lifeboat Station in 1910.

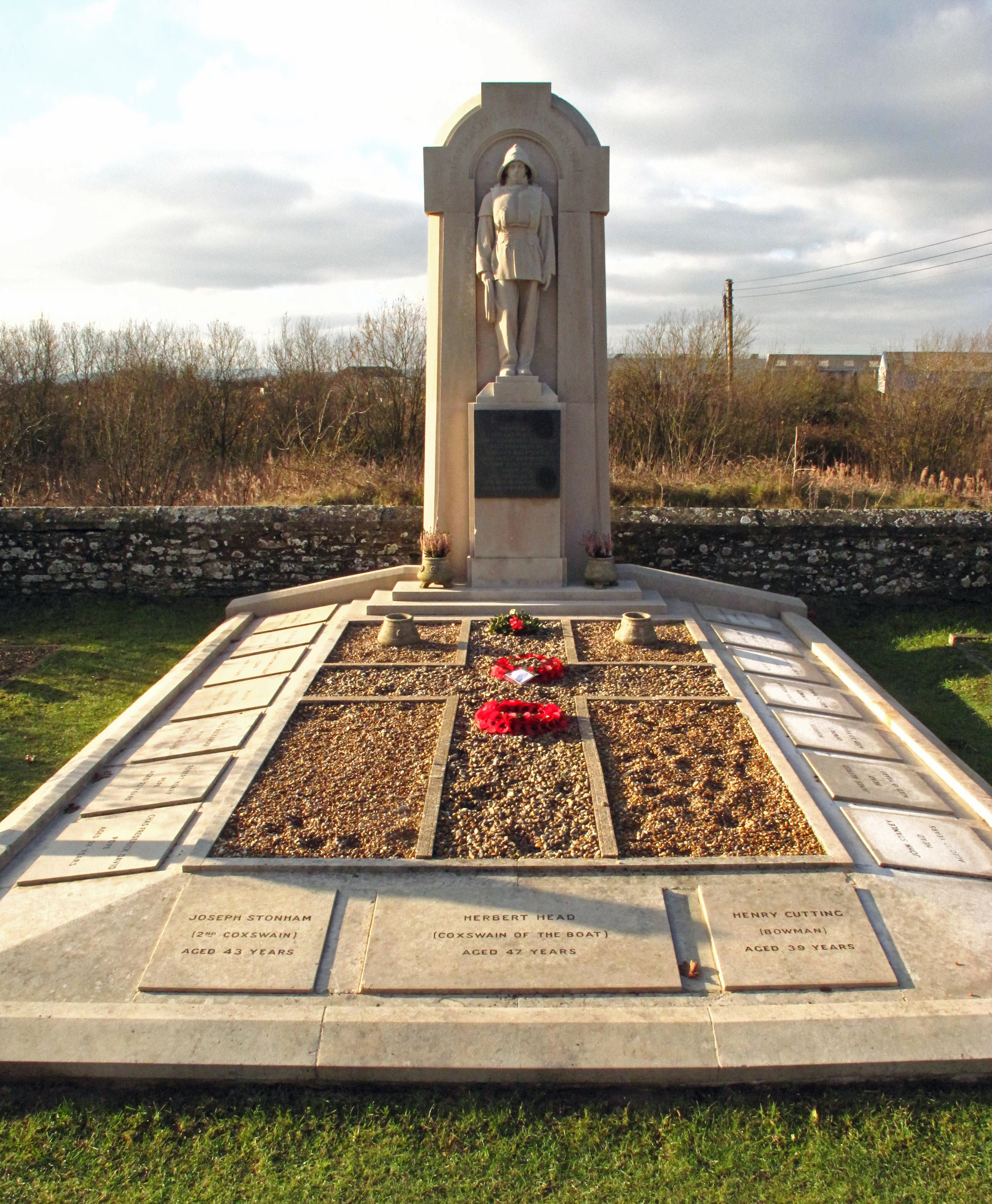
Mary Stanford Lifeboat Memorial

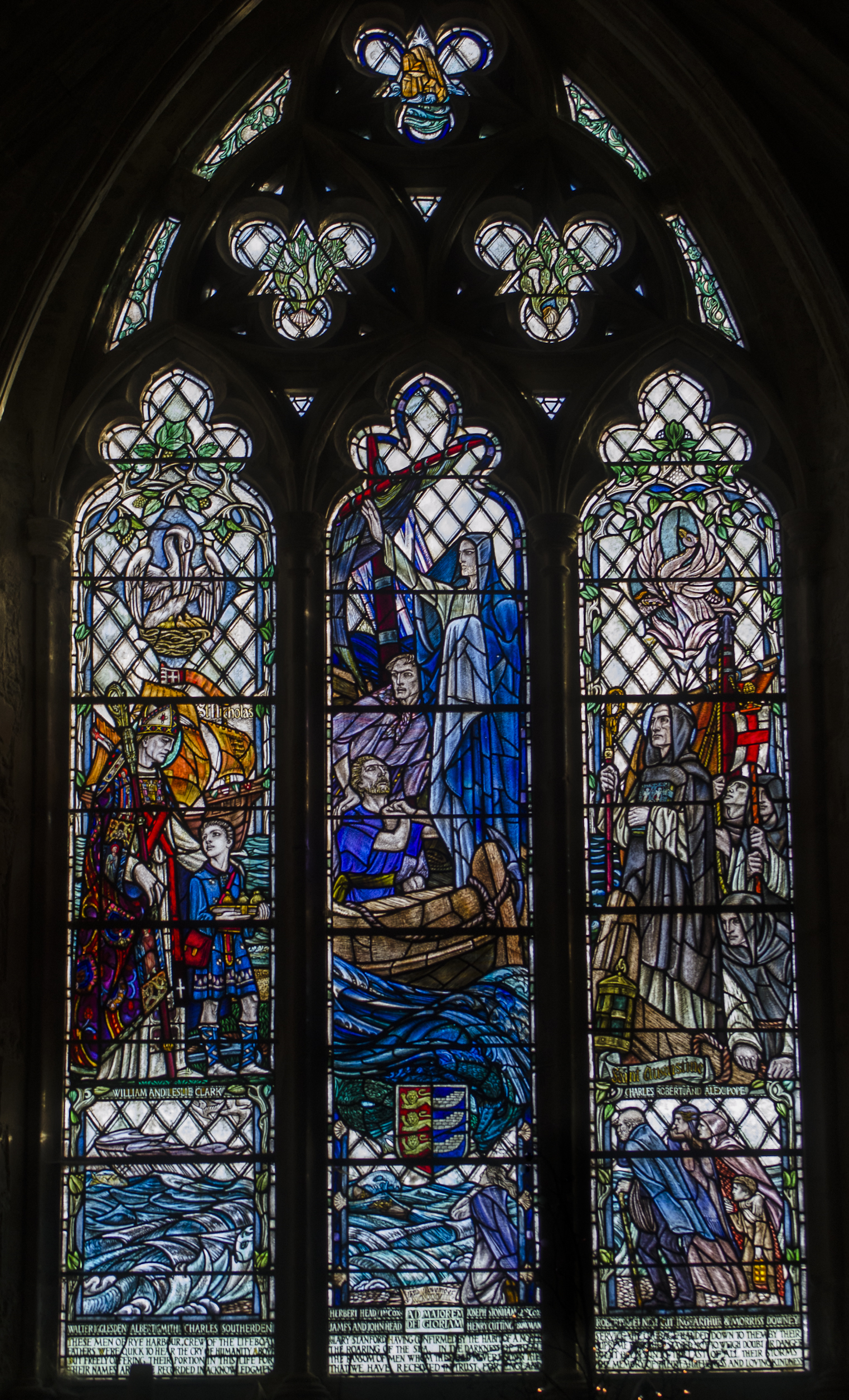
Mary Stanford Memorial window at Winchelsea Church

Following his death in 1880, the Institution received the sum of £5000, the bequest of the late John Frederick Stanford of Regent's Park, London, to provide a lifeboat to be named as a permanent memorial, in honour of his late mother. At a meeting of the RNLI committee of management on Thursday 7 July 1881, it was decided that the lifeboat be placed at Rye Lifeboat Station. Mary Stanford (ON 236) was on station from 1881–1893.

The funds would provide a second lifeboat in 1916. The 35-foot lifeboat John William Dudley (ON 453), on station since 1900, was replaced with a 38-foot 14-oared non-self-righting Liverpool-class lifeboat, which was named Mary Stanford (ON 661).

At 06:45 on 15 November 1928, Rye Harbour lifeboat Mary Stanford (ON 661) was launched into a south-west gale, to the aid of the Alice of Riga, Latvia, which had collided with another vessel, the Smyrna of Germany. Only five minutes after launching, news was received that the crew of the Alice had been rescued by the Smyrna, and the recall signal was fired three times - but it was never heard. Entering the harbour on its return nearly four hours later at 10:30, the lifeboat capsized. All 17 lifeboat men were lost.

A memorial stained glass window was placed in Winchelsea Church. It depicts a lifeboat putting out to a ship in distress while figures on the shore watch it as it goes. A memorial tablet made of Manx stone was presented to Rye Harbour, by the people of the Isle of Man.

A lifeboat was never replaced, and Rye Harbour lifeboat station (at Winchelsea) officially closed soon afterwards.

The lifeboat Mary Stanford (ON 661) was withdrawn from service, and broken up in 1929.

== 1960s onwards ==
In 1964, in response to an increasing amount of water-based leisure activity, the RNLI placed 25 small fast Inshore lifeboats around the country. These were easily launched with just a few people, ideal to respond quickly to local emergencies.

More stations were opened, and in June 1966, Rye Harbour Lifeboat Station was re-established, with the arrival of a D-class (RFD PB16) Inshore lifeboat, the unnamed (D-105).

In 1996, in preparation for the arrival of a new B-class (Atlantic 75) Inshore lifeboat, a new boathouse to be shared with the National Rivers Authority, was constructed. In addition to housing the Atlantic 85 'Drive-Off - Drive On' (DO-DO) launch carriage, and Talus MB-4H amphibious tractor, new crew facilities were provided, with a kit room, workshop and toilets, and a retail outlet. A new timber slipway and an elevated walkway leading to the boathouse was also constructed. At a double ceremony on 19 October 1996, the boathouse was officially opened, along with the naming of the new B-class (Atlantic 75) lifeboat Commander and Mrs Rodney Wells (B-727).

== Station honours ==
The following are awards made at Rye Harbour.

- RNIPLS Silver Medal

Lt. Richard Morgan, RN, H.M. Coastguard, Rye – 1834
Lt. John Somerville, RN, H.M. Coastguard, Rye – 1834

Lt. William Southey, RN, H.M. Coastguard – 1835

- RNLI Silver Medal

William Cumming Buck, RN, Chief Officer, H.M. Coastguard, Winchelsea – 1864

- A Framed Letter of Thanks signed by the Chairman of the Institution

Keith W. Downey, Helm – 1981

== Roll of honour ==
In memory of those lost whilst serving Rye Harbour lifeboat.

- Swept out of the lifeboat and lost, on service to the fishing boat Thetis, 13 February 1864

George Terry, H.M. Coastguard

- Lost when the lifeboat Storm Sprite capsized twice, on service to the steamship Medea of Sunderland, 4 November 1882

Edward Robus (38)

- Lost when the lifeboat Mary Stanford (ON 661) capsized returning to harbour, on service to the vessel Alice, 15 November 1928

Herbert Head, Coxswain (47)
Joseph Stonham, Second Coxswain (43)
Henry Cutting, Bowman (39)
William Thomas Albert Clark (27)
Leslie George Clark (24)
Roberts Redvers Cutting (28)
Albert Ernest Cutting (26)
Arthur George Downey (25)
Maurice James Downey (23)

James Alfred Head (19)
John Stanley Head (17)
Walter Igglesden (37)
Charles Frederick David Pope (28)
Lewis Alexander Pope (21)
Robert Henry Pope (23)
Albert Ernest Smith (44)
Charles Southerden (22)

== Rye Harbour lifeboats ==
=== Pulling and Sailing (P&S) lifeboats ===
ON (Note: ON is the RNLI's Official Number of the boat.)	Name	Built	On station	Class	Comments
–	Unnamed	1803	1803–1833	Greathead	(Note: Greathead-class lifeboat of unknown dimensions, built by Henry Greathead of South Shields.)
Pre-156	Unnamed	1832	1833–1856	25-foot Palmer	(Note: 25-foot x 5-foot 9in (6-oared) Palmer-class lifeboat, built by Harton of Limehouse, London, costing £59.)
Pre-278	Unnamed	1854	1856–1861	27-foot Peake Self-righting (P&S	(Note: 27-foot x 7-foot 6in (8-oared) Peake-class self-righting (P&S) lifeboat, built by Forrestt of Limehouse, London, costing £137 when new.); Previously at Dungeness (No. 1 Battery).
Pre-323	Unnamed	1858	1862–1867	30-foot Peake Self-righting (P&S	(Note: 30-foot x 7-foot 6in (10-oared) Peake-class self-righting (P&S) lifeboat, built by Forrestt of Limehouse, London, costing £185 when new.); Previously at Winterton
Pre-482	Storm Sprite	1867	1867–1883	33-foot Peake Self-righting (P&S)	(Note: 33-foot x 8-foot 2in (10-oared) Peake-class self-righting (P&S) lifeboat, gift of the Solcitors & Proctors of England, built by Forrestt of Limehouse, London, costing £280.); Capsized 1882.
228	Frances Harris	1882	1883–1899	34-foot Self-righting (P&S)	(Note: 34-foot x 8-foot 3in (10-oared) self-righting (P&S) lifeboat, legacy of Mrs F. Harris of Streatham, built by Woolfe of Shadwell, London, costing £363.)
331	Willie Rogers	1892	1899–1900	34-foot Self-righting (P&S)	(Note: 34-foot x 8-foot (10-oared) self-righting (P&S) lifeboat, legacy of Dr J. Rogers of Saltash, built by McAllister of Dumbarton, costing £383 when new.); Previously at Newquay
453	John William Dudley	1900	1900–1916	35-foot Self-righting (P&S)	(Note: 35-foot x 8-foot 6in (10-oared) self-righting (P&S) lifeboat, legacy of Mr J. W. Dudley of Woodford, Essex, built by Thames Ironworks, of Blackwall, London, costing £831.)
661	Mary Stanford	1916	1916–1928	38-foot Liverpool (P&S)	(Note: 38-foot x 10-foot 4in (14-oared) Liverpool-class non-self-righting (P&S) lifeboat, legacy of Mr. J. F. Sandford of Regent's Park, built by S. E. Saunders of Cowes, costing £2173.); Capsized 15 November 1928.

Station Closed, 1928

== Inshore lifeboats ==
=== D-class and C-class ===
Op.No. (Note: Op. No. is the RNLI's Operational Number of the boat or vehicle carried on the hull.)	Name	On station	Class	Comments
D-105	Unnamed	1966–1975	D-class (RFD PB16)	
D-241	Unnamed	1976–1986	D-class (Zodiac III)	
C-517	Unnamed	1986–1996	C-class (Zodiac Grand Raid IV)	

=== B-class ===
Op.No.	Name	On station	Class	Comments
B-548	Aldershot	1996	B-class (Atlantic 21)	
B-727	Commander and Mrs Rodney Wells	1996–2010	B-class (Atlantic 75)	
B-842	Hello Herbie	2010–2015	B-class (Atlantic 85)	
B-875	Alexander	2015–2017	B-class (Atlantic 85)	
B-900	Hello Herbie II	2017–	B-class (Atlantic 85)	

=== Launch and recovery tractors ===
Op. No.	Reg. No.	Type	On station	Comments
TW03	RLJ 367R	Talus MB-764 County	1991–1992	
TA19	Q243 YNT	County Tractor	1991–1996	
TW28H	N671 UAW	Talus MB-4H Hydrostatic (Mk3)	1996–2006	
TW19Hc	J120 VNT	Talus MB-4H Hydrostatic (Mk2)	2006–2010	
TW62Hb	DX59 LHZ	Talus MB-4H Hydrostatic (Mk1.5)	2010–2013	
TW46Hb	V938 EAW	Talus MB-4H Hydrostatic (Mk1.5)	2013–2014	
TW54Hc	DU02 WEJ	Talus MB-4H Hydrostatic (Mk2)	2014–2020	
TW56Hc	DY52 EFR	Talus MB-4H Hydrostatic (Mk2)	2020–	

== See also ==
- List of RNLI stations
- List of former RNLI stations
- Royal National Lifeboat Institution lifeboats
