= Llanaelhaearn Lifeboat Station =

Former RNLI lifeboat station in Gwynedd, Wales

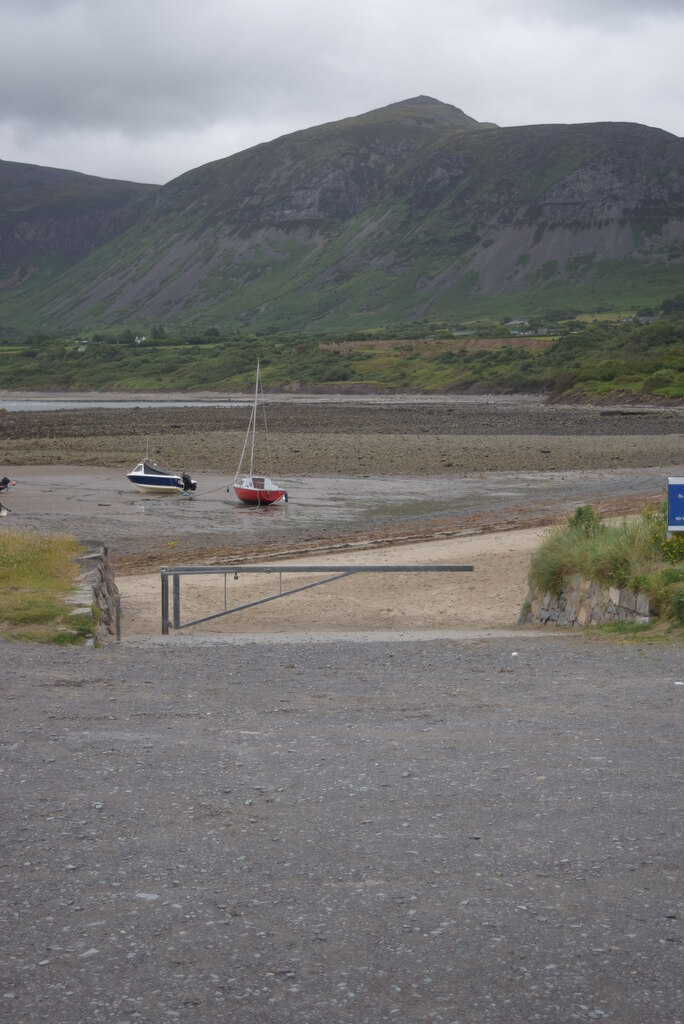
- View from site of Llanaelhaearn Lifeboat Station at Trefor

- Llanaelhaearn, Gwynedd

General information
- Status: Closed
- Type: RNLI Lifeboat Station
- Location: Trefor Pier, Llanaelhaearn, Gwynedd, LL54 5LB, Wales
- Coordinates: 52°59′55.8″N 4°25′25.2″W
- Opened: 1883
- Closed: 1901

Llanaelhaearn Lifeboat Station was actually located at Trefor harbour, some 2 miles (3.2 km) north west of the village of Llanaelhaearn, sitting between Porthdinllaen and Caernarfon on the north-east coast of the Llŷn Peninsula, in Gwynedd, North Wales.

A lifeboat was first stationed at Llanaelhaearn by the Royal National Lifeboat Institution (RNLI) in 1883.

When the lifeboat was deemed unfit for service, and with sufficient lifeboat cover locally, the station was closed in April 1901.

In all RNLI documents, the station is recorded as Llanaelhaiarn.

== History ==
On 14 October 1881, a day known for over 100 shipwrecks, and in one town, still referred to as Black Friday, when over 20 fishing boats, and 189 men, were lost, the steamship Cyprian, on passage to the Mediterranean from Liverpool, with 28 people aboard, was driven ashore in hurricane conditions on the southern edge of Caernarfon Bay.

Captain of the Cyprian, John Alexander Strachan, would give his life-jacket to a boy, a stowaway, who would then be one of only 8 survivors. Capt. Strachan didn't survive. Hearing of this act of gallantry, Mrs John Noble (Noble's Paints & Varnishes) of Park Place, Henley-on-Thames sent a gift of £800 to the RNLI to provide a lifeboat on the Caernarfonshire coast in memory of Capt. Strachan.

At a meeting of the RNLI committee of management on Thursday 2 February 1882, it was decided to appropriate the funds to a new lifeboat station at Trefor harbour, where a stone pier had been constructed for the shipment of granite from local quarries using Trefor Quarry railway, and "which is considered a very favourable position for such a station, in as much as it commands the entrance to the Menai Straits, Carnarvon bar, and the south shore of the bay, where vessels are often in danger."

A boathouse was constructed by G. Roberts at a cost of £425, and a 37-foot self-righting 'Pulling and Sailing' (P&S) lifeboat, one with oars and sails, was built by Woolfe of Shadwell, costing £392-10s-0d. A transporting carriage was also provided, at a further cost of £132. The lifeboat was first exhibited at Henley-on-Thames, where she was named Cyprian (ON 238) on 1 July 1882. When the boathouse was completed, the lifeboat was transported by rail to Caernarfon, and then sailed down to Trefor, arriving at Llanaelhaearn lifeboat station on 19 April 1883.

Launched on service for the first time on 12 December 1883 to the vessel Lady Hicks of Liverpool, the crew struggled to overcome the surf to leave the Trefor harbour. A huge wave hit the lifeboat, which was capsized, breaking both masts in the shallow water. The boat self-righted, and all crew regained the boat, but the lifeboat was driven ashore, and the rescue attempt abandoned. The crew of the Lady Hicks managed to get ashore safely in their ship's boat.

On 6 December 1895, the Llanaelhaearn lifeboat was launched to the aid of the schooner Gauntlet, de-masted in a gale 1 mile (1.6 km) off Trefor. The Porthdinllaen lifeboat was also called, and arriving first, rescued the 5 crew, landing them at Trefor.

In April 1901, the Cyprian (ON 238) was found to be unfit for service. With another lifeboat located at Porthdinllaen, just a few miles to the south, and one at Llanddwyn just 9 miles (14 km) to the north-west, it was decided that the station would close, with immediate effect. The Llanaelhaearn lifeboat had been launched eight times in 18 years, and saved two lives.

The lifeboat was sold locally. The boathouse was initially used as a store for the Quarry, and later converted to be a private residence. It was demolished in the 1960s, and all that remains is the launchway slope through a cutting in the pier.

== Llanaelhaearn lifeboat ==
ON (Note: ON is the RNLI's Official Number of the boat.)	Name	Built	On station	Class	Comments
238	Cyprian	1882	1883–1901	37-foot Self-righting (P&S)	(Note: 37-foot x 8-foot (12-oared) self-righting (P&S) lifeboat, gift of Mrs Noble of Henley-on-Thames, built by Woolfe of Shadwell, London, costing £393.); Capsized 12 December 1883.

== See also ==
- List of RNLI stations
- List of former RNLI stations
- Royal National Lifeboat Institution lifeboats
