= Rye Lifeboat Station =

Former RNLI lifeboat station in East Sussex, England

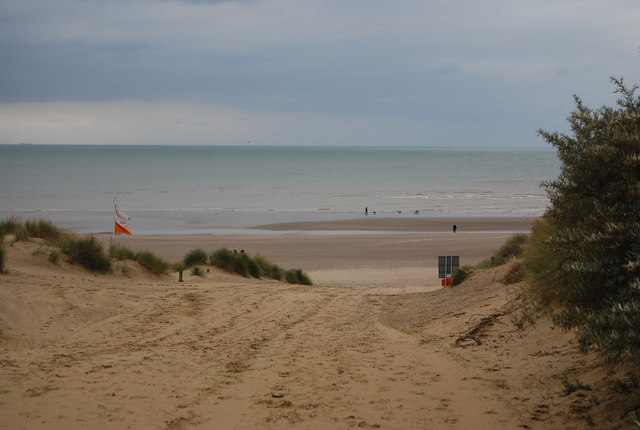
- Camber Sands

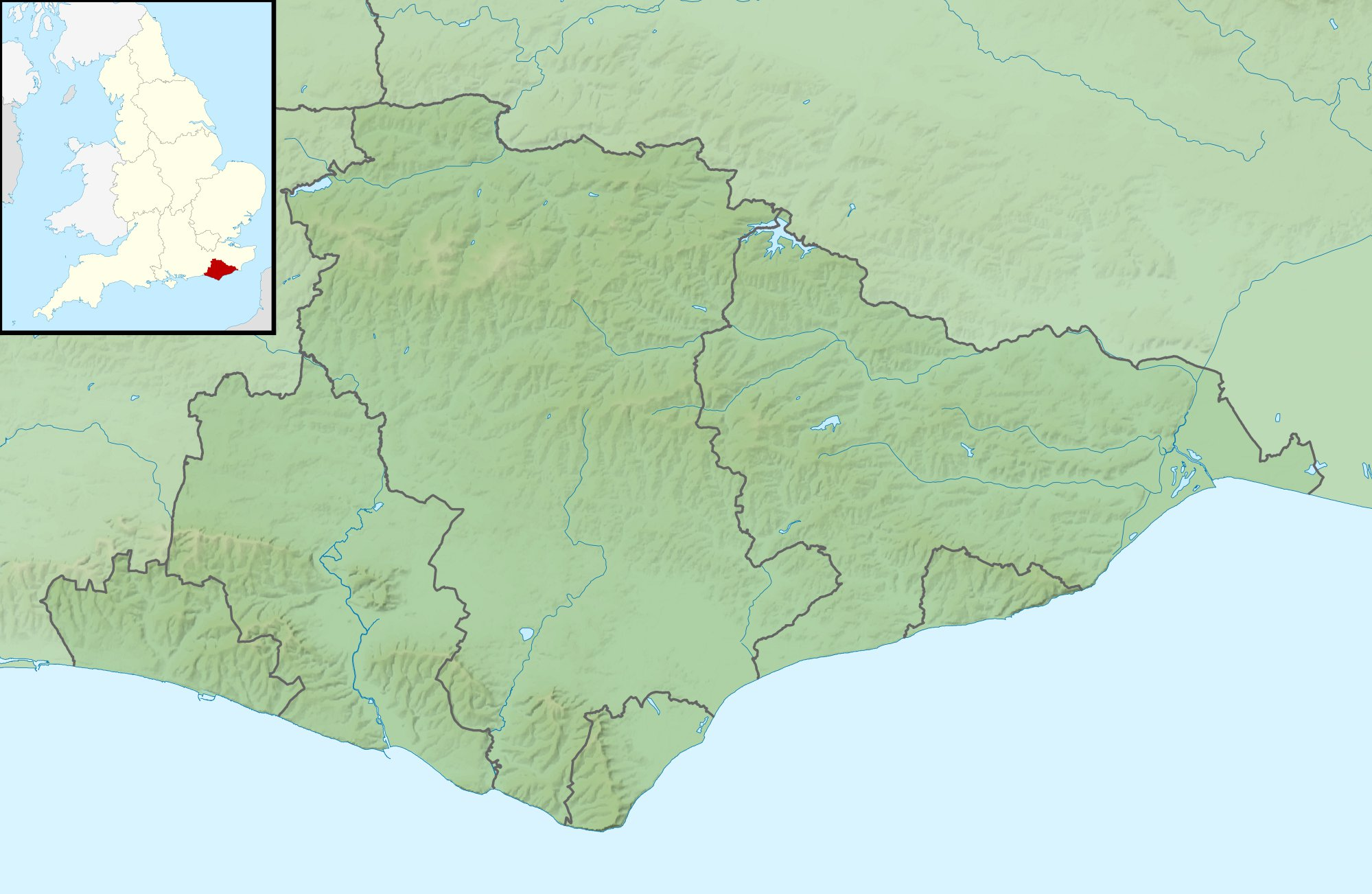
- Location within East Sussex
- Former names: Camber Lifeboat Station

General information
- Status: Closed
- Type: RNLI Lifeboat Station
- Location: Camber Sands, Camber, East Sussex, TN31 7RB, England
- Coordinates: 50°56′07.3″N 0°47′08.3″E
- Opened: 1857
- Closed: 1901
- Owner: Royal National Lifeboat Institution

Rye Lifeboat Station, initially named Camber Lifeboat Station, was located on two different sites during its period of operation, both located to the east of Camber Coastguard Station, but to the west of Camber, a village on the east bank of the River Rother estuary, in the county of East Sussex.

A lifeboat was first stationed at Camber Sands by the Royal National Lifeboat Institution (RNLI) in 1857.

After operating for 44 years, Rye Lifeboat Station closed on 26 February 1901.

== History ==
On 20 March 1838, the ship Hero of Jersey was driven ashore at Camber, East Sussex, whilst on passage to Copenhagen. The crew were ultimately rescued, but four coastguards from the Camber station were lost.

At a meeting of the committee of the Royal National Institution for the Preservation of Life from Shipwreck (RNIPLS) on 5 January 1854, it was noted that the Rye lifeboat, then stationed at Martello Tower No. 31 to the west of Rye, was to be relocated to Camber, just to the east of Rye, and replaced with one designed by Mr Peake.

However, it would be a further two years before the Rye lifeboat was replaced, and relocated to a new site near Winchelsea Coastguard Station, and a further year until Camber Lifeboat Station was established in 1857, also under the management of the Rye branch of the RNLI. A new boathouse was constructed at a cost of £75, close to the Camber Coastguard Station, where a crew would be found. A new 30-foot unnamed self-righting 'Pulling and Sailing' (P&S) lifeboat, one with oars and sails, costing £126, was placed on station.

Between 1862 and 1863, it was decided to rename Rye Lifeboat Station as Winchelsea Lifeboat Station, with Camber Lifeboat Station then taking the name Rye Lifeboat Station.

A new 32-foot lifeboat, costing £242, was provided to Rye lifeboat station in 1866, along with a new carriage, costing a further £85. Both were transported to the station free of charge, by the South Eastern Railway. The cost of the lifeboat was defrayed from the bequest of £400 in 1864, from the late Hon. Mrs Fitzroy, of Upper Grosvenor Street, London. In accordance with her wishes, the lifeboat was named Arthur Frederick, after her late son.

On 27 September 1871, the Rye lifeboat Arthur Frederick was launched into gale-force conditions, to the aid of the brigantine Cyrus, which had run aground outside the east pier at Rye Harbour. With great difficult, the lifeboat was brought along side, and rescued the crew of nine. Just 3 months later, on 14 December, both the Rye and Winchelsea lifeboats were called to the aid of the Robina, on passage from Águilas to South Shields, when she ran ashore at Jury's Gap with 17 crew aboard. Eight crew were rescued by the Rye lifeboat, with the Winchelsea lifeboat rescuing the remaining nine.

A new boathouse, located closer to the coastguard station, was constructed on the shore at Camber Sands in 1876, at a cost of £352.

Following his death in 1880, the Institution received the sum of £5000, the bequest of the late John Frederick Stanford of Regent's Park, London, to provide a lifeboat to be named as a permanent memorial, in honour of his late mother. At a meeting of the RNLI committee of management on Thursday 7 July 1881, it was decided that the lifeboat be appropriated to Rye Lifeboat Station. At a ceremony held on 8 September 1881, the 34-foot lifeboat was taken in procession through the town of Rye, to The Strand. After an address by General Kerr, mayor of Rye, and a cousin of the benefactor, and a short service, Mrs Kerr named the lifeboat Mary Stanford (ON 236), after which the boat was launched into the River Brede.

Both the Rye and Winchelsea lifeboats were launched to the aid of the steamship Medea on 4 November 1882. 16 crew were taken off the Medea by the Rye lifeboat, but the Winchelsea lifeboat capsized twice during her rescue attempts, and lifeboat man Edward Robus was swept away and drowned.

Coxswain James Collins was awarded the RNLI Silver Medal on 14 May 1891, in recognition of his gallant services, and his help saving 45 lives over a period of 12 years. Services included:–

- Chasse-marée St Anne, 16 December 1881
- steamship S.S. Matin, 4 November 1882.
- fishing smack Maid of Kent, 24 November 1885.

The last lifeboat to be placed at Rye lifeboat Station was the 34-foot Edward and Lucille (ON 344) in 1893. The boat was funded from the bequest of £1000 from the late Mrs Mary Lucille Collinson of Upton Park, London.

After operating for 44 years, Rye Lifeboat Station was closed on 26 February 1901.

Nothing remains of either boathouses at Camber Sands. The lifeboat on station at the time of closure, Edward and Lucille (ON 344), was transferred first to Scarborough, and then to St Annes, where she was wrecked operating as a boarding boat.

== Station honours ==
The following are awards made at Rye:

- RNLI Silver Medal
  James Collins, Coxswain – 1891

== Roll of honour ==
In memory of those lost whilst serving Rye (Camber):

- Lost when the coastguard boat capsized, on service to the brig Hero, 20 March 1838
  John Boulton
  Richard Connor
  John Talling
  John Scammel

== Rye lifeboats ==
=== Pulling and Sailing (P&S) lifeboats ===
ON (Note: ON is the RNLI's Official Number of the boat.)	Name	Built	On station	Class	Comments
Pre-318	Unnamed	1857	1857–1866	28-foot Peake self-righting (P&S)	(Note: 28-foot x 6-foot (6-oared) Peake-class self-righting (P&S) lifeboat, from RNLI funds, built by Forrestt of Limehouse, London, costing £126.)
Pre-459	Arthur Frederick	1866	1866–1881	32-foot Prowse self-righting (P&S)	(Note: 32-foot x 7-foot 7in (10-oared) Prowse-class self-righting (P&S) lifeboat, gift of Hon. Mrs Fitzroy, built by Forrestt of Limehouse, London, costing £242.)
236	Mary Stanford	1880	1881–1893	34-foot self-righting (P&S)	(Note: 34-foot x 7-foot 9in (10-oared) self-righting (P&S) lifeboat, legacy of Mr J. F. Stanford of Regent's Park, built by Woolfe of Shadwell, London, costing £363.)
344	Edward and Lucille	1892	1893–1901	34-foot self-righting (P&S)	(Note: 34-foot x 8-foot (10-oared) self-righting (P&S) lifeboat, legacy of Mrs L. Collinson of London, built by Chamers and Colby of Lowestoft, costing £386.)

Station Closed, 1901
Pre ON numbers are unofficial numbers used by the Lifeboat Enthusiasts' Society to reference early lifeboats not included on the official RNLI list.

== See also ==
- List of RNLI stations
- List of former RNLI stations
- Royal National Lifeboat Institution lifeboats
