= Busbie Castle =

Historic building in Scotland, UK

- Knockentiber, East Ayrshire, Scotland; UK
- A photograph of Busbie Castle in 1912

Site information
- Controlled by: Mowat
- Open to the public: Private
- Condition: Fragmentary remains

Location
- Shown within Scotland
- Coordinates: 55.620028°N 4.545639°W

Site history
- Built: 16th century
- In use: Until 18th century
- Materials: stone

Busbie Castle was situated in what is now known as Knockentiber (Scottish Gaelic: Cnoc an Tobair, hill of the well), a village in East Ayrshire, Parish of Kilmaurs, Scotland. Knockentiber is 2 miles (3.2 km) WNW of Kilmarnock and 1/2 mile NE of Crosshouse. The castle overlooked the Carmel Glen and its Burn, which runs into the River Irvine, a mile or so to the south, after passing through the old Busbie Mill.

== History ==
Busbie Castle and its surroundings in 1912.

=== The settlement ===
Ainslie's map of 1822 marks the site of the settlement as Bushby and Armstrong's map of 1775, illustrates Busbie Castle in a ruinous condition, but still with its old woodland policies. The 1860s first edition of the OS shows that a pre-reformation chapel dedicated to the Virgin Mary was situated close to the site of Busbie Castle.

Busbie Castle had a small hamlet of thatched cottages clustered nearby. In 1860 the OS shows 'Old Busbie' on the opposite side of the road from the site of the castle. Busbie and Knockentiber progressively grew together over the years.

=== The Castle ===
The castle was a simple keep, about 50 feet (15 m) high and roughly 40 feet (12 m) long by 25 feet (7.6 m) wide. The entrance was on the ground floor, giving access to the wheel-stair to the first floor hall in the north-west angle and to two cellars or stores on the ground floor. The hall on the first floor had a large fireplace and two window seats.

In 1465 the Registrum Magni Sigilli records - "Terras de le Moite," &c. 1539, "9 marcat. de Busby, viz., lie Mote, Knokintibber, et Hallethornis," &c. 1541, " Terras de Moite, Knokintebir," &c. 1571, "Terras de Moit," &c. 1583, "20 solidatas terrarum antiqui extentus de Moit-Mowat cum earum mansione," &c. 1599," 9 marcat. terrarum de Busbeyis (viz., lie Mote, Knockiutibber et Halythornis".

In 1691 the Laird of Busbie's dwelling had six hearths and seven other dwellings were associated with the castle and its lands.

The castle was a ruin since at least the 1770s. and was demolished in 1949 or 1952 as it had been unsafe for many years and the funds were not found to consolidate the structure. H. Ritchie had Busbie House erected as a replacement for the old castle. Busbie Estates and Collective Securities Limited owned a fair amount of land in the 1950s.

Busbie Castle circa 1866. Paterson

MacIntosh in 1894 refers to the castle as being "a prominent object in an otherwise monotonous landscape" and describes the gun ports and arrow slits, also a sculptured cable which wound itself fantastically round the walls. He also states that the castle probably had three floors, was roofless and fast falling into decay and regards it as being from the 14th century and probably built by the Mowat family who came from Flintshire in the 12th century.

=== The lairds of Busbie ===
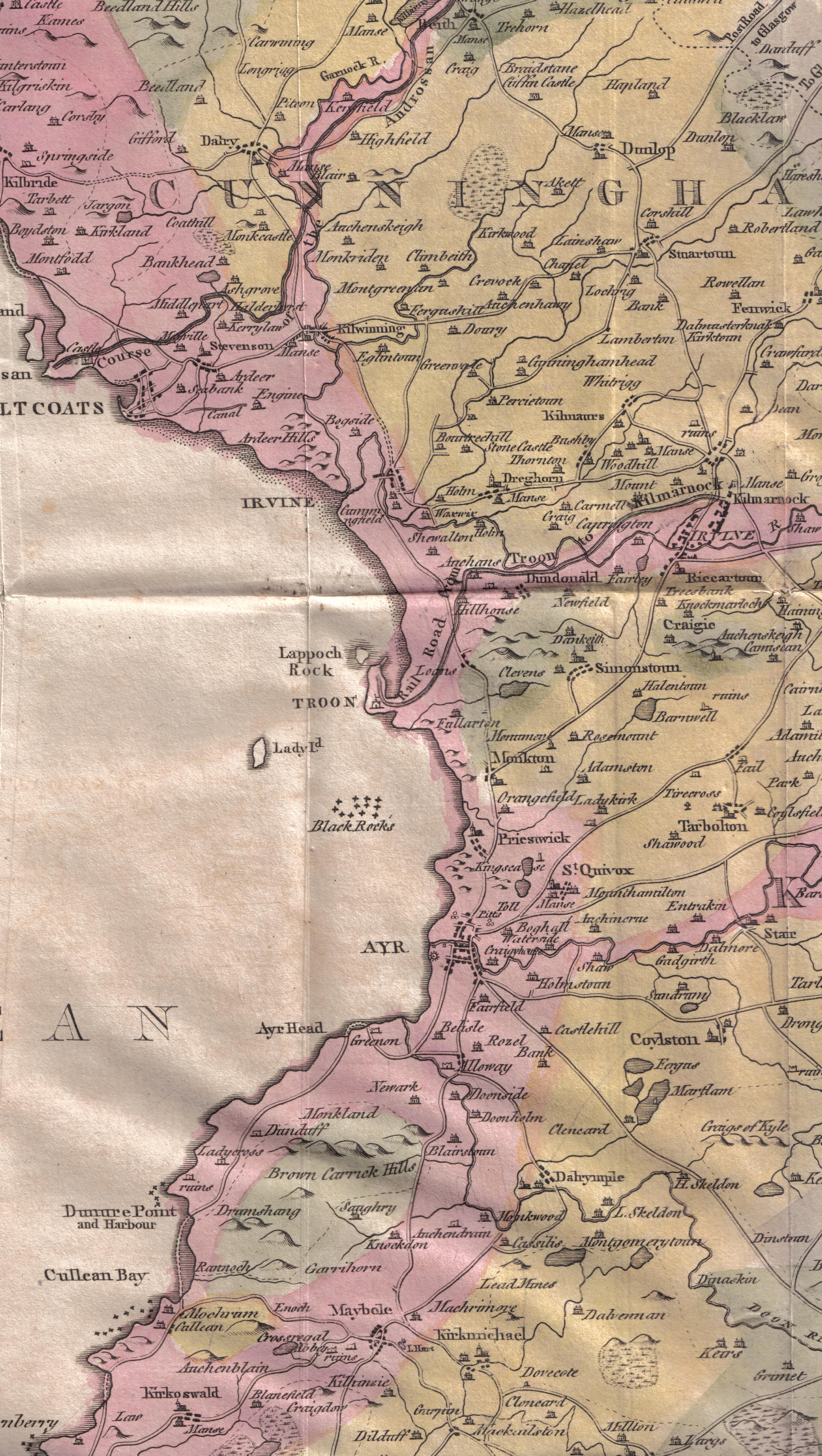
William Aiton's 1811 map showing Busby (sic).

A Robert de Montealt (Monteacute) is recorded as being in Scotland at the time of King David I; later several soldiers of the name de Montealt are recorded as having led armies into Scotland. William Craufurd of Wallston married a daughter of Mowat of Busbie circa 1400. A Charles Mowat of Busbie is mentioned in the records of 1534 as being involved in the murder of William Cunyngham of Craganis and his servant. Charles Mowat was tutor to Hugh, Earl of Eglinton in 1546. and the same Charles Mowat was fined £47 in 1571 - 2 for celebrating mass at Eglinton Castle. In 1547 Charles Mowat was again involved in a murder, this time with Lord Boyd; Sir Neil Montgomerie of Lainshaw being the victim. His punishment was to remain in France until Sir Neil Montgomerie, son of the murdered Sir Neil, permitted him to return. It was not all one way, for a brother of the Earl of Eglinton appears in court having provoked John Mowatt, Laird of Busby, and his servant, one Andrew Stevenston in the streets of Stewarton.

The Mowat involved in the Montgomerie murder was in turn slain by William & Harrie (Sic) Stewart, the two sons of Lord Ochiltree in 1577. Alexander, the eldest son does not appear to inherit, instead James, his younger brother succeeded to the lands of Busbie. James's son, also James is the last Mowat to appear in the public record. The name de Monhaud or de Monte Alto is recorded as being pronounced 'Mowat' by Dalrymple.

James Ritchie of Craigton obtained the lands in 1763, succeeded by his son Henry in 1799, who also acquired the Cloncaird estate. William Wallace of Cairnhill (now Carnell), the nephew of Henry, next inherited the estate. General Sir James Wallace died in 1867 and passed the property to William Wallace of Busbie and Cloncaird. In 1661, Hugh, Earl of Eglinton inherited the lands of Busbie, Knockentiber and Robertown, the family possessing these lands as far back as 1638.

==== The breaking of the sabbath ====
An 18th century print of Busbie Castle.

A frequently repeated legend is that of the Rev. Mr. Welsh of Ayr, who after providing several written warnings, prophesied the downfall of the house of Busbie, because the laird refused to suppress the custom of inviting guests to his house on the Sabbath day, and profaning the sabbath by playing football and other games. The prophecy was visibly fulfilled; for although the laird was very wealthy at the time, misfortune was heaped upon misfortune until he was forced to sell his estate, and when he was giving it over to the purchaser, he said with tears in his eyes, in front of his wife and children, "Now Mr. Welsh is a true prophet." This laird was the father of the Rev. Mathew (Sic) Mowat of Kilmarnock. James Mowat is the last to appear in the public records.

== The Barony of Robertoun ==
This barony, once part of the Barony of Kilmaurs, ran from Kilmaurs south to the River Irvine. It had no manor house and belonged to the Eglinton family latterly. Hugh Montgomerie, Ist Earl of Eglinton, had a charter on 3 February 1499 from James V of the £40 lands of old extent of Roberton in Cunninghame. These lands were part of the Lands and Barony of Ardrossan; the following properties were part of the barony: parts of Kilmaurs, Knockentiber, Craig, Gatehead, Woodhills, Greenhill, Altonhill, Plann, Hayside, Thorntoun, Rash-hill Park, Milton, Windyedge, Fardelhill, Muirfields, Corsehouse.

=== Busbie Mill ===
The present Busbie farm is marked on the older maps, e.g. 1860, as a mill, with a clear millrace or lade and a sluice. The water was taken from the Carmel somewhere in the vicinity of a dwelling marked as Busbie Holm, rejoining the burn just beyond the mill. It is not clear as to when the mill ceased to operate. It is likely that the mill was associated with the castle and the Lairds of Busbie. A Robertown mill is known to have existed, named from the title of the Barony.
