= Cloncaird Castle =

Castle in South Ayrshire, Scotland

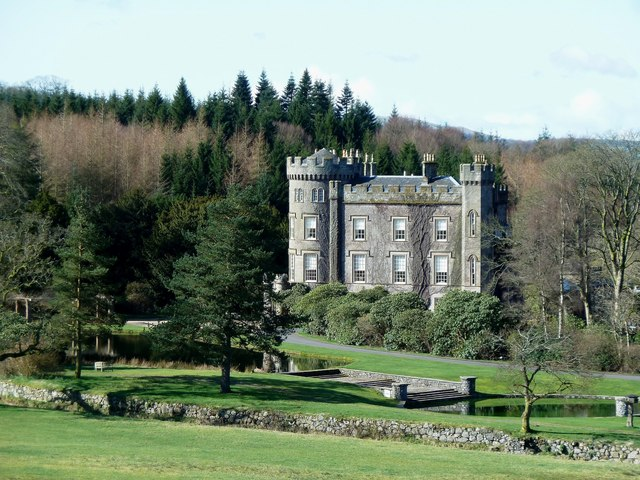
- Cloncaird Castle from the east

- Location in South Ayrshire
- 55.3345°N 4.5902°W

Listed Building – Category B
- Designated: 14 April 1971
- Reference no.: LB7557

Cloncaird Castle is located near the small village of Kirkmichael, around 6 kilometres (3.7 mi) east of Maybole in South Ayrshire, Scotland. The castle lies beside the Kelsie Burn, at the centre of a 140 acres (57 ha) estate. Originally a 16th-century castle, it was extended and rebuilt as a country house in the early 19th century. After a time as a convalescent home, it is now a private residence once more.

== History ==
The castle was originally built during the 16th century, and is described as having been in the style of feudal mansions of that period, with a large square tower, narrow spiral staircase, and other indications of the time to which it belonged. An armorial panel dated 1585 is still in place on the castle wall. Towards the close of the 16th century it was in the possession of Walter Mure, a scion of the Auchendrane family, and cousin of the Laird of Auchendrane who devised the murder of Sir Thomas Kennedy of Culzean. This Walter Mure of Cloncaird was the perpetrator of the murder, and was assisted in the execution of his crime by his boon companion, Kennedy of Drumurchy.

Cloncaird was purchased by Henry Ritchie of Craigton and Busbie in the early 19th century. Born in 1777, Henry Ritchie was a descendant of James Ritchie, 'merchand burgess' of Glasgow; whose name appears in the Commissary Register in 1674. The family was settled in Craigton, Lanarkshire in 1746, and Henry's father, James, acquired the estate of Busbie, Ayrshire in 1763 and married 1765 Catharine, daughter of Robert Kerr of Newfield, a grandson of the 1st Marquess of Lothian. Ritchie made Cloncaird his chief residence, and in 1814 he had the front entirely re-built and modernised, giving the castle its current appearance. Ritchie succeeded his father at Busbie and Craigton in 1799, and was twice married: to Elizabeth Cathcart (died 1836); then in 1838 to Catherine, daughter of James Fergusson of Kilkerran, 4th Baronet. Ritchie died in 1843 having had three unmarried daughters by his first wife, and the estates passed to his sister's son, William Wallace of Cairnhill.

In 1905 Cloncaird was sold by Colonel Hugh Robert Wallace to a Mrs Dubs, widow of Charles Ralph Dubs and daughter of William Roe Arthur who he then married in 1908. The castle was extensively renovated at this time. Mrs Dubs died in 1947, and from 1949 the mansion was used as the Dubs Memorial Convalescent Home, operated by the local authority. When this closed the castle returned to private ownership. It was purchased before 2003 by Ephraim Belcher, chairman of Belcher Food Products. The house is a category B listed building. Within the grounds are category C listed structures including an Arts and Crafts style garage, U-shaped stable block and a bridge. The grounds also contain a pond, weir and fountain, and a walled garden.
