= Ardrossan Lifeboat Station =

Former RNLI lifeboat station in North Ayrshire, Scotland

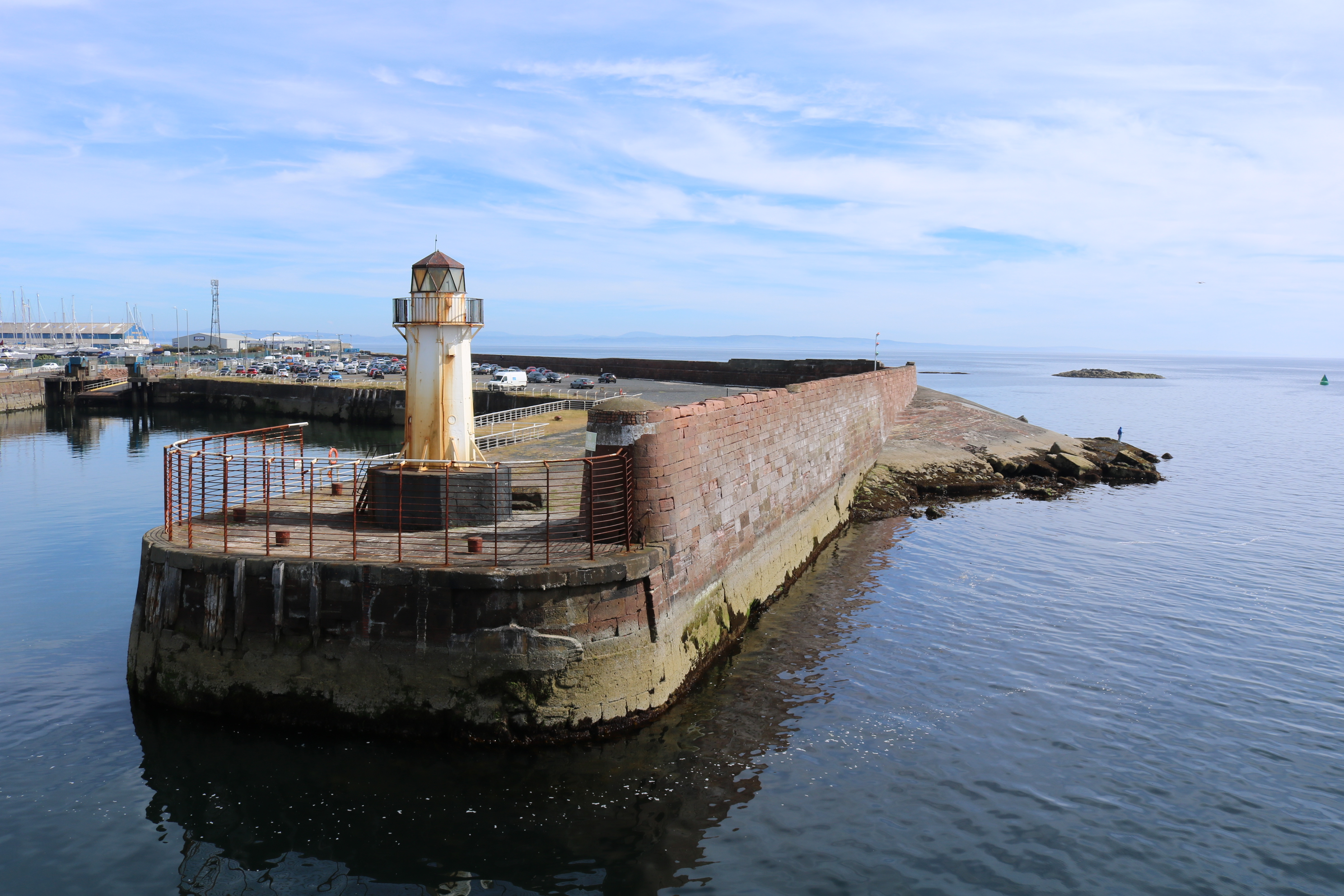
- Site of Ardrossan Lifeboat Station

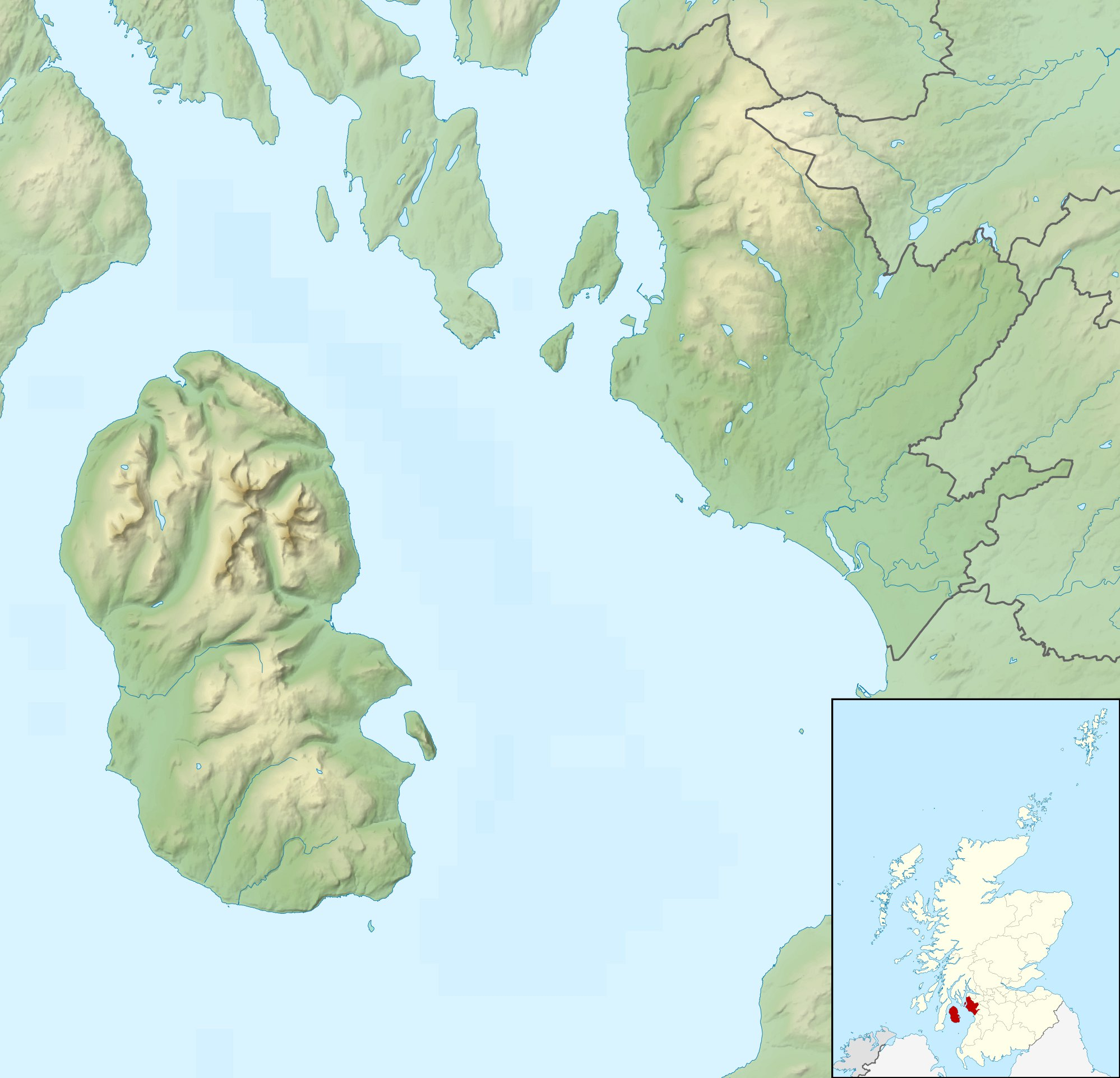
- Location within North Ayrshire

General information
- Status: Closed
- Type: RNLI Lifeboat Station
- Location: West Pier, Old Tidal Basin, Ardrossan Harbour, Ardrossan, North Ayrshire,, Scotland
- Coordinates: 55°38′24.7″N 4°49′32.1″W
- Opened: 1807, RNLI 1869
- Closed: 1930

Ardrossan Lifeboat Station was located on the outer west pier at the harbour at Ardrossan, a town overlooking the Firth of Clyde and the Isle of Arran, in the county of North Ayrshire, historically Ayrshire, on the south-west coast of Scotland.

A lifeboat was first stationed at Ardrossan in 1807, by the Ardrossan Lifeboat Society, the gift of Hugh Montgomerie, 12th Earl of Eglinton. Management of the station transferred to the Royal National Lifeboat Institution (RNLI) in 1869.

Ardrossan Lifeboat Station closed in 1930.

== History ==
On 10 November 1831, a coastguard officer and 10 men launched the local private lifeboat, to the aid of the brig Lady Montgomerie, which sank off Saltcoats harbour. The Master, Mate and one crew man were lost, but two apprentices were rescued. Ever since its founding in 1824, the Royal National Institution for the Preservation of Life from Shipwreck (RNIPLS), later to become the RNLI in 1854, would award medals for deeds of gallantry at sea, even if no lifeboats were involved. Lt. William Lyons, RN, H.M. Coastguard, was awarded the RNIPLS Silver Medal.

Following the report from the Inspector of Lifeboats, and with the kind co-operation of G. B. M. Beatson, late Divisional Officer of H.M. Coastguard, at the meeting of the RNLI committee of management on 4 Nov 1869, it was decided to take over the existing Ardrossan lifeboat station. As the existing boat was an old obsolete version, a new lifeboat with carriage was provided, and a new boathouse was constructed.

The lifeboat, a 33-foot self-righting 'Pulling and Sailing (P&S) lifeboat, one with sails and (10) oars, and costing £277-17s-6d, along with a new transporting carriage, which cost £100-10s, were conveyed free of charge from Carlisle to Ardrossan by the Glasgow and South Western Railway Company. On the 18th June 1870, the lifeboat was taken in a grand procession through the town to the outer harbour, with vessels, houses and public buildings decorated with flags, and joined by members of the lifeboat committee, Town Council, local artillery volunteers, Freemasons, and two bands. The lifeboat was then launched and demonstrated to the watching crowd.

The entire cost of the station, lifeboat, carriage and equipment was met by the gift of Mr. Peter Reid of London. At his request, the lifeboat was named Fair Maid of Perth. Mr Reid had previously funded the lifeboat Palmerston, stationed at Cullercoats.

Just 6 months later, the lifeboat would be called for the first time. On New Years Day 1871, the lifeboat launched at 10:00 to the brig Morning Star of Dublin, driven ashore on the west side of Horse Isle, in a S.S.W. gale. The lifeboat was towed to the vessel by Steam tug, finding the crew clinging to a rock, but unable to get ashore. With the help of a line, five men were pulled through the surf to the lifeboat, although the last man managed to swim to the island, and was picked up. All six were landed at Ardrossan.

The Fair Maid of Perth was launched to the barque Matilda Hilyard on 1 March 1880. After the rescue of her 12 crew, the lifeboat was being towed to harbour by a steam tug, when the lifeboat capsized. Two lifeboat crew, William Grier and Alexander McEwan, were lost, along with two crew members of the Matilda Hilyard, John Hickey (United States) and Vincent Luthemburger (Austria). Coxswain William Breckenridge died later of congestion of the lungs. There is no mention of the capsize and loss of life in the minutes of the RNLI committee of management of 1 April 1880. It was recorded that a replacement lifeboat was being sent to Ardrossan, and that 10 lives were recorded saved from the Matilda Hilyard.

In the RNLI journal 'The Lifeboat' of 1 November 1881, it was recorded of Ardrossan, that "The National Life-boat Institution has provided a new Life-boat for this place, the crew having lost confidence in the old boat, consequent on her having upset when in tow". The new lifeboat was 34-foot long, and after trials, it was reported that the crew was very happy with the new boat, with its better steering and easier rowing. Funded once again by Mr Peter Reid, the lifeboat was again named Fair Maid of Perth.

At a meeting of the RNLI committee of management on Thursday 10 April 1930, it was decided that Ardrossan would be one of four lifeboat stations to be closed, the others being Hope Cove, Looe and Mevagissey.

The Ardrossan boathouse was built on the lighthouse (west) pier in the harbour. Now a busy terminal, nothing remains of the building. The lifeboat on station at the time of closure, James and John Young (ON 636), was transferred to the relief fleet, being sold out of service in 1939. The upturned hull of the boat can be found as a feature outside the People's Palace, Glasgow.

== Station honours ==
The following are awards made at Ardrossan.

- RNIPLS Silver Medal

Lt. William Lyons, RN, H.M. Coastguard – 1831

== Roll of honour ==
In memory of those lost whilst serving Ardrossan lifeboat.

- Lost when the lifeboat Far Maid of Perth capsized, on the return from service to the Matilda Hilyard, 1 March 1880

William Breckenridge, Coxswain (41), (died 28 March 1880 of congestion of the lungs)
William Grier, (53)
Alexander McEwan, (47)

== Ardrossan lifeboats ==
=== Ardrossan Lifeboat Society lifeboats ===
ON (Note: ON is the RNLI's Official Number of the boat.)	Name	Built	On station	Class	Comments
–	Unnamed	1807	1807−c.1847	26-foot 6in North Country	(Note: 26-foot 6in x 7-foot 3in (12/14-oared) North Country non-self-righting lifeboat, gift of Hugh Montgomerie, 12th Earl of Eglinton.)
Pre-262	Unnamed	1853	1853–1870	26-foot Peake Self-righting (P&S)	(Note: 27-foot x 7-foot 6in (8-oared) Peake--class self-righting lifeboat, built by Forrestt of Limehouse, London, costing £125.); Previously at Cemlyn.

Pre ON numbers are unofficial numbers used by the Lifeboat Enthusiast Society to reference early lifeboats not included on the official RNLI list.

=== RNLI lifeboats ===
==== Pulling and Sailing (P&S) lifeboats ====
ON	Name	Built	On station	Class	Comments
Pre-542	Fair Maid of Perth	1870	1870−1880	33-foot Peake Self-righting (P&S)	(Note: 33-foot x 8-foot 2in (10-oared) Peake-class self-righting (P&S) lifeboat, gift of Mr P. Reid of London, built by Woolfe of Shadwell, London, costing £278.)
Pre-648	Fair Maid of Perth	1880	1880−1892	34-foot Self-righting (P&S)	(Note: 34-foot x 8-foot 3in (10-oared) self-righting (P&S) lifeboat, gift of Mr P. Reid of London, built by Woolfe of Shadwell, London, costing £363.)
309	Charles Skirrow	1891	1892−1899	37-foot Self-righting (P&S)	(Note: 37-foot x 8-foot (12-oared) self-righting (P&S) lifeboat, legacy of Mrs Skirrow of Hyde Park, London, built by Forrestt of Limehouse, London, costing £537.)
425	James Stevens No. 8	1899	1899−1913	35-foot Liverpool (P&S)	(Note: 35-foot x 10-foot (12-oared) Liverpool-class non-self-righting (P&S) lifeboat, legacy of Mr J. Stevens of Birmingham, built by James Beeching of Great Yarmouth, costing £544.)
636	James and John Young	1913	1913−1930	35-foot Liverpool (P&S)	(Note: 35-foot x 10-foot (12-oared) Liverpool-class non-self-righting (P&S) lifeboat, legacy of Mr J. Young of Pollockshields, built by Thames Ironworks of Blackwall, London.)

== See also ==
- List of RNLI stations
- List of former RNLI stations
- Royal National Lifeboat Institution lifeboats
