= Glenternie House =

Building in Peebles, Scotland

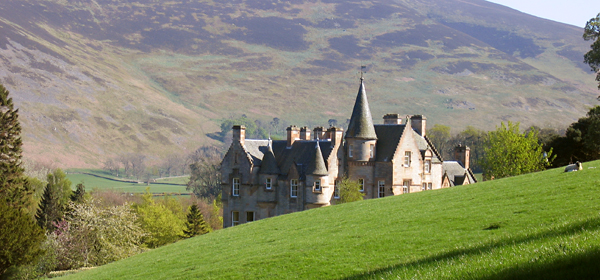
Glenternie House

Glenternie House is a Scots-Baronial style mansion built between 1863 and 1868. It is situated near the town of Peebles, Scotland. It is a category B listed building.

== History ==
Glenternie was originally built for David Kidd Esq., of Leyton in Essex. He was a wholesale stationer in Fleet Street, and also owned the Inveresk Paper Mills. Kidd was the inventor of the modern gummed envelope. The designs and architecture were carried out by Brown & Wardrop and notably David Bryce. On the site of Glenternie, Kidd set about building himself a mansion house complete with a coach house and stables, a drive and lodge, led by fine wrought iron gates, and a park with specimen trees. The specification for the house dated 1868 shows every single detail of what was to be built, and was signed by Kidd and nine witnesses. The masons estimate was £3465. Kidd died in 1874 before the house was completed and was unable to see his fine new house finished. Soon after the house was finished, a dam forming a pond was built below the Glenternie Burn. The house was then occupied by his two sisters, Miss Pringle Kidd, and Miss Elizabeth. Pringle Kidd died in 1902 at the age of 96.

The house was sold in 1903 for £17,300 to Thomas Inglis, the proprietor of Bonnington Flour Mills in Edinburgh. He introduced the Belgian Hare to the Parish. He was succeeded by his brother, John, owner of John Inglis (shipbuilder), a well known shipbuilder situated in Glasgow. John died in 1922. The house was empty for 30 years. After this in 1952, it was sold to the Wolfe-Murray family, then the Morrow family in 1979. The Woodd family have been living at Glenternie since 1998.
