= Carnsore Lifeboat Station =

Former RNLI lifeboat station in County Wexford, Ireland

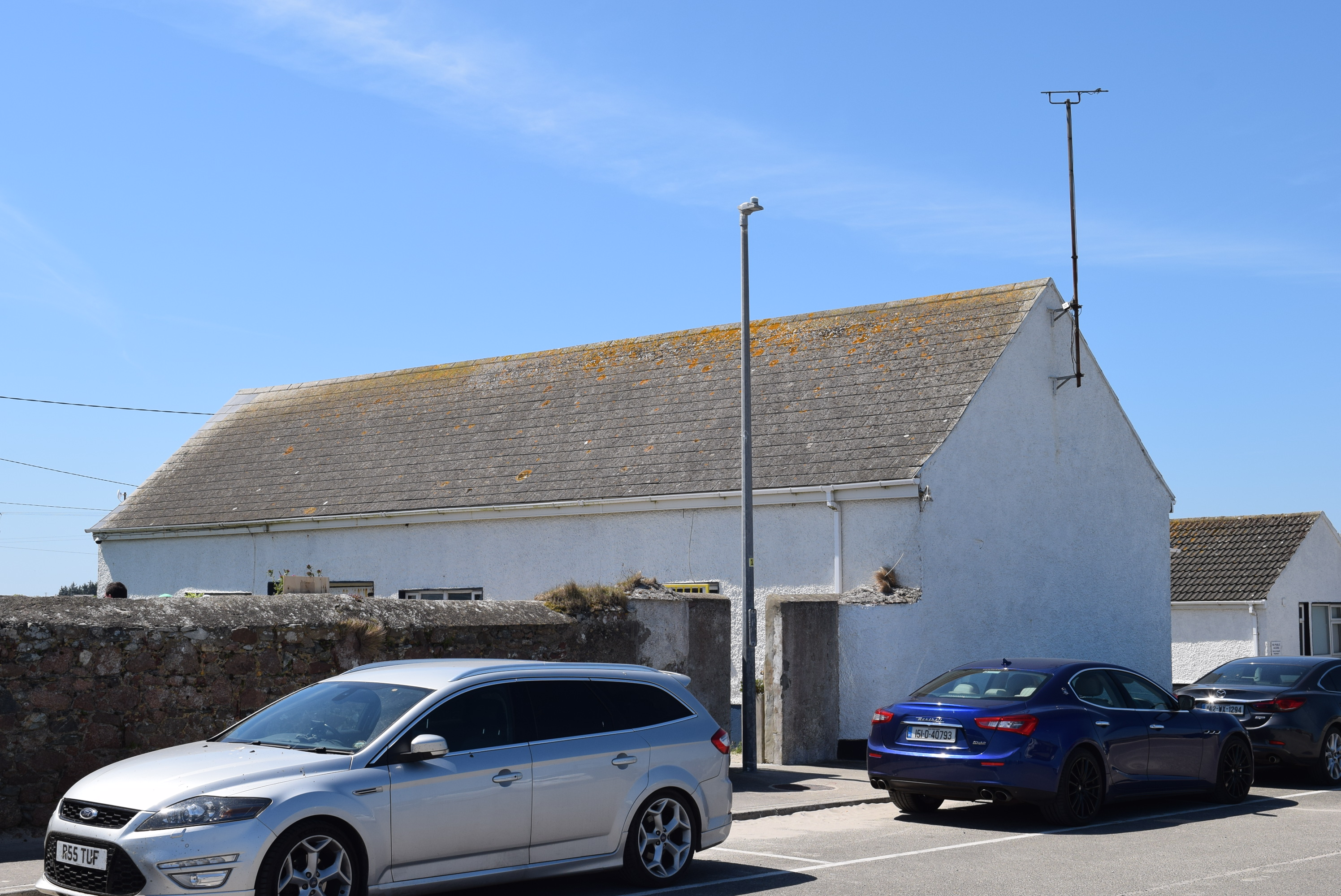
- Former Carnsore RNLI Lifeboat House, Carne, Co. Wexford

- Carne, County Wexford

General information
- Status: Closed
- Type: RNLI Lifeboat Station
- Location: Carne, Carne, County Wexford, Ireland
- Coordinates: 52°11′50.6″N 6°20′56.0″W
- Opened: 1859
- Closed: 1897

Carnsore Lifeboat Station was located at the small harbour at Carna, near the village of Carne, Wexford, approximately 4 kilometres (2.5 mi) north of Carnsore Point and 8 kilometres (5.0 mi) south of Rosslare Harbour, on the south east tip of Ireland.

A lifeboat station was first established at Carna in 1859, by the Royal National Lifeboat Institution (RNLI).

After 38 years in operation, Carnsore Lifeboat Station was closed in 1897.

== History ==
At a meeting of the RNLI committee of management on Thursday 2 September 1858, it was resolved to place a 30-foot self-righting 'Pulling and Sailing' (P&S) lifeboat, one with sails and 6 oars, single banked, at three locations in Ireland, Tramore, Dungarvan and Carnsore. At a further meeting on Thursday 7 October 1858, a Miss Houlin was thanked for the use of an existing boathouse, and for granting a site for a new boathouse. Thanks were also conveyed to Mr C. H. Cooke, Honorary Architect of the Institution, who had supplied plans for the Carnsore boathouse.

In the RNLI journal of 1 January 1859, it was reported that a lifeboat had been forwarded to Carnsore, funded by a donation from Mrs A. M. Burdon, as a thankyou, following her recent escape from drowning when upset from a boat. In accordance with her wishes, the lifeboat was named Gertrude.

The lifeboat would be the first of three placed at Carnsore. After just over a year on station, in the early hours of 10 February 1861, in a north-east gale, the barque Guyana of Glasgow, on passage to St Kitts, was driven ashore on Carrig Rocks, near Greenore Point, County Wexford. The lifeboat was called, and with seven horses harnessed up, the lifeboat set out on its carriage at 03:00 for Greenore Point, some 9 kilometres (5.6 mi) away. It took until 09:00 to arrive, whereupon the lifeboat was then lowered 80 feet (24 m) down the cliff to the water. Twice the lifeboat set out for the wreck, but each time was forced to return to shore in the conditions. Finally, with extra crew aboard, the lifeboat got away. Reaching the wreck, she set anchor, and veered down, taking on board the 19 exhausted crew, and brought them ashore. Two RNLI Silver Medals were awarded.

On 26 May 1867, the lifeboat was launched to the aid of the vessel Blanche Moore of Liverpool, on passage to Calcutta, India, when she was wrecked on Long Bank off County Wexford. In a service lasting 16 hours, 36 crew were saved. James Barrett, Chief Officer, H.M. Coastguard Carnsore, and RNLI Honorary Secretary, had been taken along at the request of the Coxswain, and was awarded a second-service clasp to his previously won RNLI Silver Medal.

As had been found soon after the Gertrude had first entered service, a 6-oared lifeboat wasn't powerful enough in some conditions. In March 1874, a replacement 32-foot lifeboat, with 10 oars, double banked, was sent to the station. The lifeboat had previously served at Bridlington Quay as the Robert Whitworth, but with a further gift of £300 from Mrs Burdon appropriated to the station, the lifeboat was renamed Iris at her request.

In recognition of his service to the Carnsore lifeboat since 1861, including service to the following vessels, Coxswain Patrick Kavanagh was awarded the RNLI Silver Medal in 1886:

- Guyana (10 February 1861) – 19 lives saved.
- Blanche Moore (26 May 1867) – 36 lives saved.
- Shields (18 June 1875) – 3 rescued
- Paquite De Terranova (25 September 1875) – 10 lives saved.
- Fairy (19 December 1878) – 6 lives saved.
- Chevereul (21 December 1879) – 14 lives saved.
- John A. Harvie (26 November 1880) – 19 lives saved.
- White Star (24 December 1883) – Assisted with the rescue of 30 lives.

The third and last lifeboat to be stationed at Carnsore was the Robert Fitzstephens (ON 262), a larger 37-foot self-righting P&S lifeboat, which was delivered to Wexford, and sailed round to her station by the crew, arriving on station in 1890.

Patrick Kavanagh would be awarded a second RNLI Silver Medal (Second-service clasp) in 1891, on his 30th anniversary as Coxswain. During this time, he had launched 29 times on service, and was instrumental in saving 130 lives. Since his first award, further services include:

- Samanco (14 December 1886) – 9 lives saved.
- Rose (19 February 1890) – 3 lives saved.

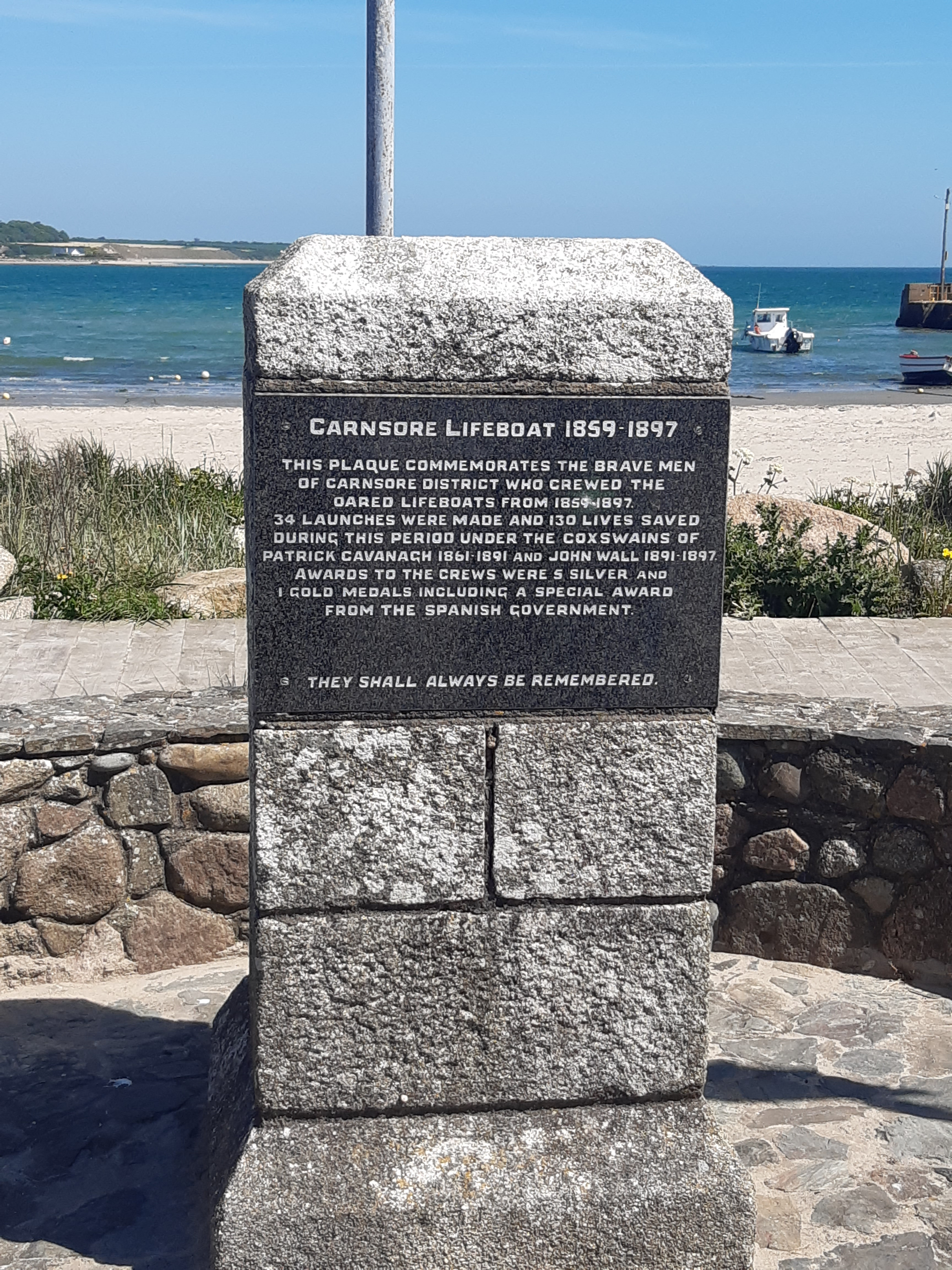
Carnsore RNLI Lifeboat Memorial

In the RNLI report of 1898, it was stated that several lifeboat stations had been closed in the previous year, "Owing to the variations in the amount of sea traffic which have taken place of late years on different parts of the coast, and the substitution, to a considerable extent, of steam vessels for small coasters and other small trading vessels, it has been found necessary by the Institution in several cases to place more powerful Life-boats at some stations and in other instances to close stations altogether." Along with five other lifeboat stations, including Kingsgate and Bamburgh Castle, and despite an exemplary record of rescues and lives saved, Carnsore Lifeboat Station was closed in 1897.

The lifeboat house still exists, now a private residence. The lifeboat on station at the time of closure, Robert Fitzstephens (ON 262), was transferred first to Burry Port, and later to Courtown in 1903. She was retired from service in 1915, and broken up in 1917. A pillar and tablet now stands near the pier, to commemorate the brave crew of Carnsore Lifeboat.

== Station honours ==
The following are awards made at Carna.

- RNLI Silver Medal

Capt. William Luke Partridge, RN, Inspecting Commander, H.M. Coastguard Carnsore – 1861
James Barrett, Chief Officer, H.M. Coastguard Carnsore – 1861

James Barrett, Chief Officer, H.M. Coastguard Carnsore, RNLI Honorary Secretary – 1867 (Second-Service clasp)

Patrick Kavanagh, Coxswain – 1886

Patrick Kavanagh, Coxswain – 1891 (Second-Service clasp)

== Carnsore lifeboats ==
ON (Note: ON is the RNLI's Official Number of the boat.)	Name	Built	On station	Class	Comments
Pre-342	Gertrude	1859	1859–1874	30-foot Peake Self-righting (P&S)	(Note: 30-foot x 6-foot 3in (6-oared) Peake-class self-righting (P&S) lifeboat, gift of Mrs A. M. Burdon of Castle Eden, built by Forrestt of Limehouse, London, costing £136.)
Pre-460	Iris	1866	1874–1890	32-foot Prowse Self-righting (P&S)	(Note: 32-foot x 7-foot 4in (10-oared) Prowse-class self-righting (P&S) lifeboat, funded by Mrs Burdon of Castle Eden, County Durham, built by Forrestt of Limehouse, London, costing £230.); Previously Robert Whitworth at Bridlington
262	Robert Fitzstephens	1890	1890–1897	37-foot Self-righting (P&S)	(Note: 37-foot x 8-foot (12-oared) self-righting (P&S) lifeboat, gift of an 'anonymous lady', Forrestt of Limehouse, London, costing £569.)

Station Closed, 1897

Pre ON numbers are unofficial numbers used by the Lifeboat Enthusiast Society to reference early lifeboats not included on the official RNLI list.

== See also ==
- List of RNLI stations
- List of former RNLI stations
- Royal National Lifeboat Institution lifeboats
