= Blakeney Lifeboat Station =

Former RNLI lifeboat station in Norfolk, England

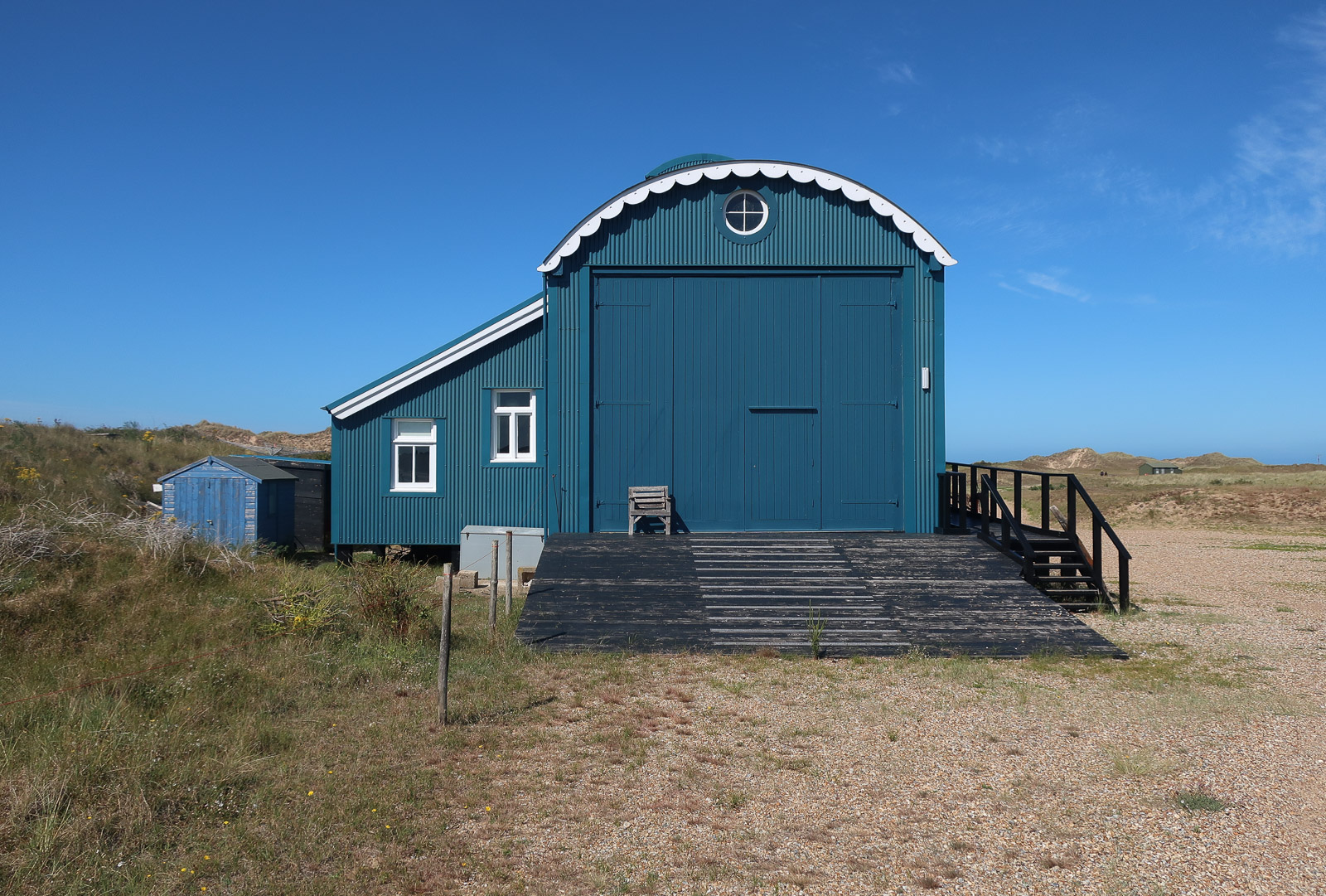
- Former Lifeboat House, Blakeney Point

- Blakeney Point, Norfolk

General information
- Status: Closed
- Type: RNLI Lifeboat Station
- Location: Blakeney Point, Blakeney, Norfolk, England
- Coordinates: 52°58′23.5″N 0°58′26.8″E
- Opened: 1824–1843 (NSA); 1862–1935 (RNLI)
- Closed: 1935

Blakeney Lifeboat Station was located at the end of the shingle spit at Blakeney Point, north of the village of Blakeney, mid-way between Wells-next-the-Sea and Sheringham, on the north coast of the county of Norfolk.

The Norfolk Association for Saving the Lives of Shipwrecked Mariners (NASLSM) placed a lifeboat at Blakeney in 1824, but no service records are available, and the station was closed c.1843. A lifeboat station was re-established at Blakeney Point by the Royal National Lifeboat Institution (RNLI) on 6 October 1862.

Blakeney Lifeboat Station was closed in 1935.

== History ==
At a meeting of the RNLI committee of management on Thursday 7 November 1861, it was ordered that a that a life-boat station be formed at Blakeney, on the Norfolk coast.

At a further meeting on Thursday 6 February 1862, it was noted that, via the Rev. P. J. Saffery of Tottenham, that a Miss Brightwell of Norwich wished to present the cost of the lifeboat (£180) to the Institution, and desired "that the boat might be named The Brightwell after her father." It was also recorded that a boathouse, costing £154, had been ordered for Blakeney.

The official opening of the station was held on 6 October 1862, a local committee having been created from the local clergy and gentry of the area. The lifeboat was a 30-foot self-righting 'Pulling and Sailing' (P&S) lifeboat, one with (6) oars, single-banked, and sails, constructed by Forrestt of Limehouse, London, and was duly named Brightwell.

Almost immediately, it was recognised that the boat just wasn't big enough, and with just 6 oars, not powerful enough either. In May 1863, the RNLI committee decided that the Blakeney boat would be replaced as soon as was possible, and by October 1883, the original boat had been transferred to Ferryside RNLI Lifeboat Station, and a replacement boat was on station. Previously a 30-foot lifeboat which served at Fishguard, the boat had been returned to the manufacturers, and extended to 36-feet 4in, now rowing 12-oars, double-banked. Both lifeboats were transported to and from London and Wells-next-the-Sea, free of charge, by the Great Eastern railway company. On arrival at Blakeney, the lifeboat was again named Brightwell.

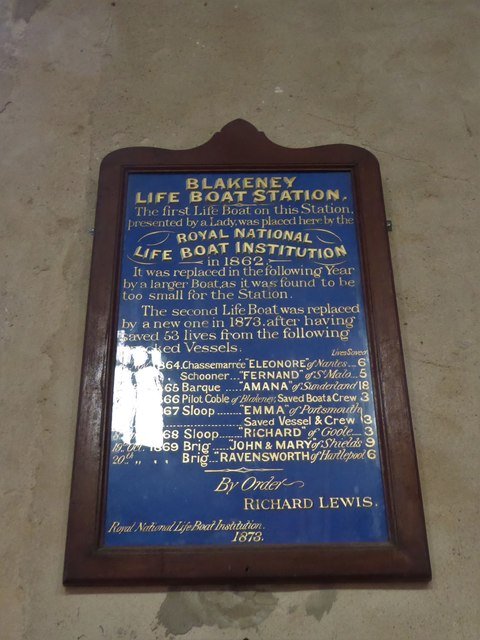
Blakeney Lifeboat Service Board 1

Over the next six years, the Blakeney lifeboat recorded eight lifesaving rescues, saving 53 lives,

- 4 November 1864, Chasse-marée Eleanore of Nantes – Six
- 23 November 1864, Schooner Fernand of St. Malo – Five
- 20 February 1865, Barque Amana of Sunderland - Eighteen
- 12 August 1866, Pilot coble of Blakeney - Three and boat.
- 1 January 1867, Sloop Emma of Portsmouth - Three and boat
- 8 April 1869, Sloop Richard of Goole - Three
- 19 October 1870, Brig John and Mary of South Shields - Nine
- 20 October 1870, Brig Ravensworth of Hartlepool - Six

Despite this fine record, it was recorded that the coxswain and crew had repeatedly stated that boat was not suited to the area, not having sufficient beam, and that confidence in the boat had been lost. The Brightwell was withdrawn from service in 1873, returned to London free of charge by the Great Eastern railway company, but was subsequently broken up.

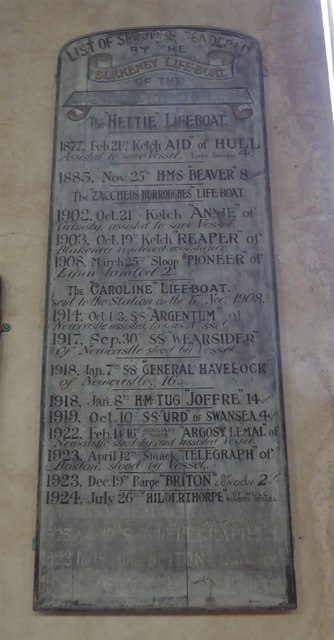
Blakeney Lifeboat Service Board 2

The Brightwell was replaced with the Hettie, a 37-foot lifeboat, funded by a gift from a gentleman from Bradford, who also promised to support the expenses every year. The lifeboat was towed to its station by the steamship Mack Diamond. Hettie would serve at Blakeney for the next 18 years, recording two rescues, and saving 12 lives.

In 1891, Blakeney took delivery of the Zaccheus Burroughs (ON 318), a 35-foot lifeboat, funded from the bequest of the late Mrs. Burroughs of South Norwood, and named in memory of her late husband. The lifeboat was once of only three Cromer-class lifeboats, all with a wide beam, built by the Beeching brothers of Great Yarmouth.

In 1896, Coxswain William Hooke was awarded the RNLI Silver Medal on his retirement, for his service since 1865.

A new boathouse was constructed in 1898, and is still standing. It is currently a visitor centre for the National Trust.

The last lifeboat to be stationed at Blakeney was the Caroline (ON 586), a 38-foot Liverpool-class lifeboat rowing 14 oars, arriving on 17 November 1908. She was funded from the bequest of the late Miss Caroline Everard of Laverstock, Wiltshire.

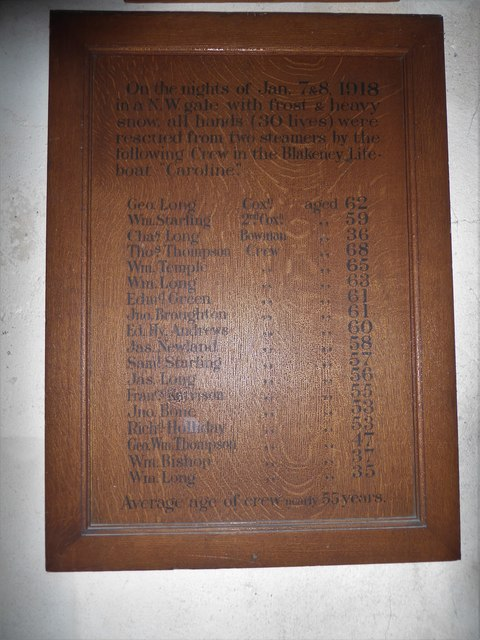
War Service Plaque

Caroline would also go on to have a fine service record at Blakeney. In two services in January 1818 during World War I, 30 men were rescued. Other than a one line entry, very little detail is available in the RNLI journal 'The Lifeboat', maybe due to wartime reporting, but a wooden plaque now in Blakeney church, records the crew who, in frosty and snowing conditions in a north-west gale, rescued 16 men from the steamship General Havelock of Newcastle-upon-Tyne on 7 January 1918, and 14 men from the H.M. Tug Joffre on 8 January 1918. She would go on to save another six lives during her time on service.

At a meeting of the RNLI committee of management on Thursday 14 March 1935, it was decided to close the lifeboat stations at Brancaster and Blakeney. By this time, motor-powered lifeboat were already located at Skegness and Cromer, and new ones were due at the flanking stations of Wells-next-the-Sea and Sheringham in 1936. It had been eleven years since the Caroline had been last required in 1924.

The lifeboat on station at the time of closure, Caroline (ON 586), was sold from service, and last reported in 1960. The Blakeney lifeboat service boards can be seen on display in the Church of St Nicholas, Blakeney.

== Station honours ==
The following are awards made at Blakeney.

- RNLI Silver Medal

William Hooke, Coxswain – 1896

== Blakeney lifeboats ==
=== NSA ===
Name	Built	On station	Class	Comments
Unnamed	1824	1824−c.1843	North Country lifeboat	(Note: North Country lifeboat of unknown dimensions or manufacturer)

=== RNLI ===
==== Pulling and Sailing (P&S) lifeboats ====
ON (Note: ON is the RNLI's Official Number of the boat.)	Name	Built	On station	Class	Comments
Pre-394	Brightwell	1862	1862−1863	30-foot Peake Self-righting (P&S)	(Note: 30-foot x 7-foot (6-oared) Peake-class self-righting (P&S) lifeboat, gift of Miss Brightwell of Norwich, built by Forrestt of Limehouse, London, costing £160.); Almost immediately proven to be too small for the location.
Pre-293	Brightwell	1855	1863−1873	36-foot 4in Peake Self-righting (P&S)	(Note: 36-foot 4in x 8-foot (12-oared) Peake-class self-righting (P&S) lifeboat, gift of Miss Brightwell of Norwich, built by Forrest of Limehouse, London, costing £156 when new. Previously 30-foot x 7-foot 6in, lengthened in 1863.); Previously at Fishguard.
Pre-578	Hettie	1873	1873−1891	37-foot Self-righting (P&S)	(Note: 37-foot x 9-foot 5in (12-oared) self-righting (P&S) lifeboat, gift of 'A Friend', via G. Firth of Bradford, built by Woolfe of Shadwell, London, costing £412.)
318	Zaccheus Burroughes	1891	1891−1908	35-foot 3in Cromer (P&S)	(Note: 35-foot 3in x 10-foot 3in (14-oared) Cromer-class non-self-righting (P&S) lifeboat, legacy of Miss E. Burrows of South Norwood, built by James Beeching of Great Yarmouth, costing £426.)
586	Caroline	1908	1908−1935	38-foot Liverpool (P&S)	(Note: 38-foot x 10-foot 9in (14-oared) Liverpool-class non-self-righting (P&S) lifeboat, legacy of Miss C. Everard of Salisbury, built by Thames Ironworks of Blackwall, London, costing £1,202.)

Station Closed, 1935
Pre ON numbers are unofficial numbers used by the Lifeboat Enthusiast Society to reference early lifeboats not included on the official RNLI list.

== See also ==
- List of RNLI stations
- List of former RNLI stations
- Royal National Lifeboat Institution lifeboats
