= Littlestone-on-Sea Lifeboat Station =

RNLI lifeboat station in Kent, England

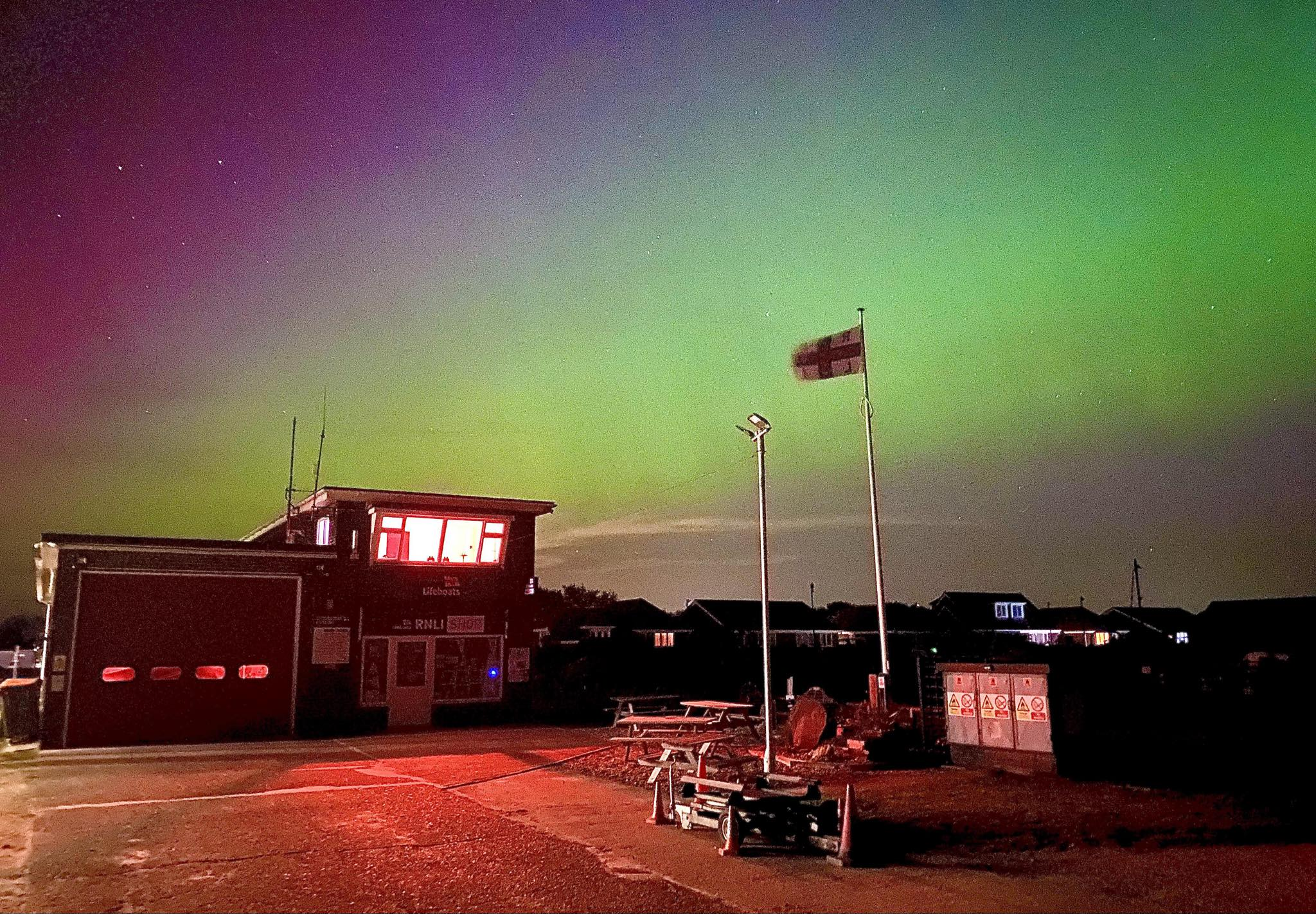
- Littlestone-on-Sea Lifeboat Station

- Location within Kent

General information
- Type: RNLI Lifeboat Station
- Location: Coast Drive, Greatstone-on-Sea, Kent, TN28 8NR, England
- Coordinates: 50°58′28.7″N 0°57′56.1″E
- Opened: 1966
- Owner: Royal National Lifeboat Institution

Website
- Littlestone-on-Sea RNLI

Littlestone-on-Sea Lifeboat Station is located on Coast Drive, actually at Greatstone-on-Sea, approximately 1.5 miles (2.4 km) south east of New Romney, on the Kent coast.

A lifeboat was stationed here between 1861 and 1928, but was known initially as Dungeness Lifeboat Station (1861–1874), and then New Romney Lifeboat Station (1874–1928). It was never known as Littlestone Lifeboat Station.

For further information, please see:–

- Dungeness Lifeboat Station
- New Romney Lifeboat Station

In 1966, the Royal National Lifeboat Institution (RNLI) established Littlestone-on-Sea Lifeboat Station as an Inshore lifeboat station.

The station currently operates the B-class (Atlantic 85) Inshore lifeboat Jean McIvor (B-922), on station since 2020.

== History ==
The Dungeness Lifeboat Station was established at the 'No.1 Battery' near Lydd in 1854, with the placement of a 27-foot (8-oared) self-righting lifeboat. However, the 2-ton boat provided was found to be too heavy to be easily launched over the shingle, and so a 1.5-ton boat was provided in 1857. Of course, this was now too lightweight for the sea conditions encountered. In 1861, another new boat was provided, but the solution to the weight issue, was to relocate the lifeboat. The boat was relocated to a station at Littlestone-on-Sea, and a boathouse constructed near the coastguard station across the end of Marine Parade.

In 1874, it was found necessary to reopen a station nearer to Dungeness point, this being named Lydd (Dungeness) Lifeboat Station. To avoid confusion, the station at Littlestone was renamed New Romney Lifeboat Station. The New Romney station stayed in operation until 1928, when faster motor-powered lifeboats were placed at flanking stations.

In response to the boom of water-based leisure activity in the 1950s and 1960s, the RNLI introduced a small fast inflatable 2-man lifeboat at many stations. Able to be launched by 2 or three people in just a few minutes, and with a crew of just two or three, the advantages over the regular All-weather lifeboats was clear, and the ideal solution to be able to provide a fast response to inshore incidents.

In 1966, the RNLI established an Inshore lifeboat station at Littlestone-on-Sea, and placed on service a D-class (RFD PB16) Inshore boat (D-90). Inshore lifeboat were initially placed at stations during summer months. A further three D-class lifeboats were placed at Littlestone, but in 1972, a larger twin engined trial Atlantic-class lifeboat, known as an Atlantic 17, arrived on station.

A B-class (Atlantic 21) would be placed on service in 1976, and the following year, a new brick-built boathouse was constructed, to house the boat, and provide better crew facilities. On Tuesday, 31 May 1976, HRH The Duke of Kent, President of the Institution, visited Littlestone. After the dedication of the Atlantic 21 and new boathouse, the Duke unveiled a plaque, formally opening the boathouse, which had been built by the crew members themselves, from material donated, or discounted by local companies.

Littlestone-on-Sea Inshore lifeboat Fred Clarke (B-785) would be the last of the B-class (Atlantic 75) lifeboats on service, being retired in 2021. The boat was replaced by the B-class (Atlantic 85) lifeboat Jean McIvor (B-922), which had been at the station since December 2020, but had training delayed due to Covid.

The new lifeboat was funded from the legacy of £600,000 from Mrs Jean Campbell McIvor, of Middlesex. Mrs McIvor, who died in 2017, had been a radar operator for the Women's Royal Air Force during World War II. She was also the River Thames Punting Champion 1947–50.

== Littlestone-on-Sea lifeboats ==
=== D-Class ===
Op.No. (Note: Op. No. is the RNLI's Operational Number of the boat carried on the hull.)	Name	On station	Class	Comments
D-90	Unnamed	1966–1969	D-class (RFD PB16)	
D-37	Unnamed	1968	D-class (RFD PB16)	
D-50	Unnamed	1970	D-class (RFD PB16)	
D-189	Unnamed	1970–1972	D-class (RFD PB16)	

=== B-Class ===
Op.No.	Name	On station	Class	Comments
B-3	Unnamed	1970	B-class Atlantic 17 (Trial)	Previously designated (C-1)
B-5	Unnamed	1972–1974	B-class Atlantic 17 (Trial)	Previously designated (C-3)
B-4	Unnamed	1974–1976	B-class Atlantic 17 (Trial)	Previously designated (C-2)
B-533	Unnamed	1976–1988	B-class (Atlantic 21)	
B-573	The Lady Dart and Long Life II	1988–2001	B-class (Atlantic 21)	
B-701	Gordon England	2001–2002	B-class (Atlantic 75)	
B-785	Fred Clarke	2002–2021	B-class (Atlantic 75)	
B-922	Jean McIvor	2020–	B-class (Atlantic 85)	

=== Launch and recovery tractors ===
Op. No.	Reg. No.	Type	On station	Comments
TW05	UJT 151S	Talus MB-764 County	1977–1978	
TW08	D508 RUJ	Talus MB-764 County	1979–1994	
TW31	L526 JUJ	Talus MB-764 County	1994–1999	
TW45Ha	T249 JNT	Talus MB-4H Hydrostatic (Mk1)	1999–2008	
TW37Hc	P898 CUX	Talus MB-4H Hydrostatic (Mk2)	2008–2015	
TW58Hc	DX53 VRF	Talus MB-4H Hydrostatic (Mk2)	2015–2017	
TW21Hc	J495 XUJ	Talus MB-4H Hydrostatic (Mk2)	2017–2023	
TW61Hb	DX09 LRZ	Talus MB-4H Hydrostatic (Mk1.5)	2024–	

== See also ==
- List of RNLI stations
- List of former RNLI stations
- Royal National Lifeboat Institution lifeboats
