= Dunwich Lifeboat Station =

Former RNLI lifeboat station in Suffolk, England

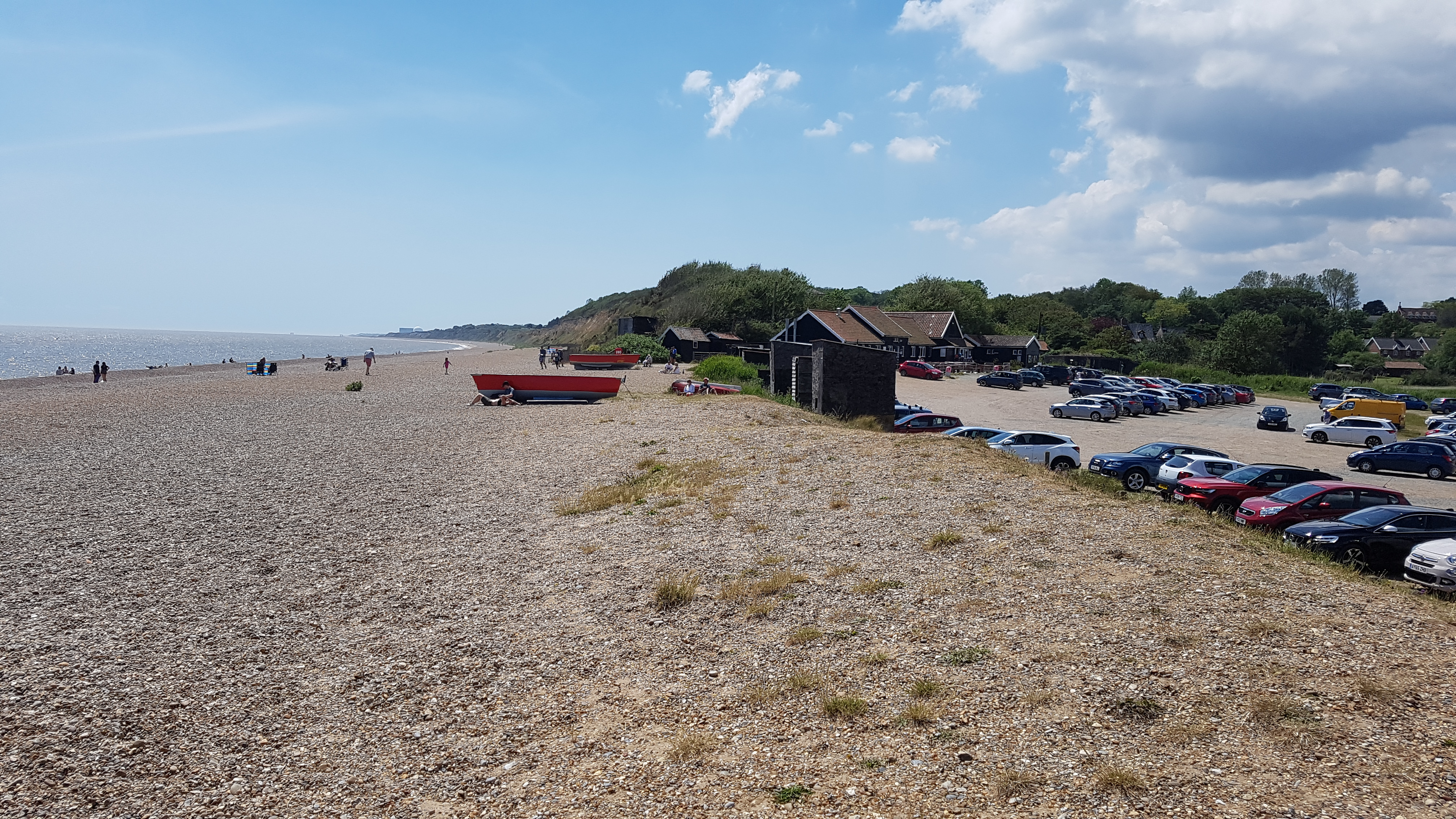
- Site of the Dunwich Lifeboat Station.

- Dunwich, Suffolk

General information
- Status: Closed
- Type: RNLI Lifeboat Station
- Location: Beach Rd, Dunwich, Suffolk, IP17 3EN, England
- Coordinates: 52°16′42.3″N 1°37′58.4″E
- Opened: 1873
- Closed: 1903

Dunwich Lifeboat Station was located at Beach Road, in Dunwich, a village approximately 30 miles (48 km) north-east of Ipswich, on the Suffolk coast.

A lifeboat station was first established at Dunwich by the Royal National Lifeboat Institution (RNLI) in 1873.

Dunwich Lifeboat Station closed in 1903.

== History ==
The meeting of the RNLI committee of management on Thursday 6 March 1873 was reported in the RNLI journal 'The Lifeboat'. Following application by local residents, and on the recommendation of the RNLI Inspector of Lifeboats following a visit, it was decided to establish a lifeboat station at Dunwich on the Suffolk coast, in-between the existing lifeboat stations at Southwold and Thorpeness.

Following a donation of £500 from the Rev. Thomas Keble of Bisley vicarage, near Stroud, an amount provided by late members of his family, the lifeboat would be named in memory of his older brother John Keble, (25 April 1792 – 29 March 1866), an English Anglican priest, poet and author of The Christian Year, and was one of the leaders of the Oxford Movement. Keble College, Oxford was also built in his memory.

It was said that some shipwrecks had occurred in the Dunwich area with loss of life. Any vessels striking Sizewell bank would end up wrecked at Dunwich, before either of the lifeboats at the flanking stations could come to the rescue. With sufficient numbers of local fishermen available as crew to establish a station, a 30-foot self-righting 'Pulling and Sailing' (P&S) lifeboat, one with (8) oars and sails, was sent to Dunwich, transported free of charge by the Great Eastern Railway, along with its transporting carriage. A boathouse was constructed at the end of Beach Road, at a cost of £192-10s.

On 9 October 1873, a procession, including local dignitaries, the lifeboat and crew, lifeboat committee, coastguard, and the Volunteers band, made their way to the local church, where a service of dedication was held. Afterwards, the procession continued to the boathouse, accompanied by the band, and witnessed by a large crowd, the boat was duly named John Keble, before being launched for a demonstration.

When the schooner Day Star was driven ashore at Thorpeness during a N.N.E gale on 27 December 1886, the Southwold No.1 lifeboat arrived on scene first. The first man to make an attempt to reach the lifeboat, fell into the sea, and drowned. During the rescue, the Southwold coxswain was washed overboard, but his foot caught in a rope, and he quickly regained the lifeboat. With understandable reluctance, 4 men were eventually taken off the Day Star, but the Master could not be persuaded. He was later rescued by the John Keble lifeboat from Dunwich, and landed at Thorpeness.

A new 34-foot lifeboat was placed at Dunwich in 1887, along with a new launch carriage. The new and old lifeboats were conveyed free of charge to and from Suffolk by the Great Eastern Railway. At a ceremony on 13 May 1887, having been funded from the legacy of the late Mrs Ferguson of Bolton, the lifeboat was named Ann Ferguson (ON 30), in accordance with her wishes. The bequest from Mrs Ferguson also funded a second lifeboat, placed at North Berwick in 1887, and named Fergus Ferguson (ON 121), after her late husband.

Back in 1879, the name of the Brancaster lifeboat Joseph and Mary was transferred to a lifeboat at Poole, and the existing lifeboat was renamed Lily Bird (ON 256), attributed to a gift of £600 donated by Mr Samuel Bird of Belsize Park, London, for the placement of a lifeboat in Suffolk or Norfolk. However, as the boat wasn't new, Samuel Bird was assured by the Brancaster Honorary Secretary that the next new lifeboat at Brancaster would also be named Lily Bird.

The new lifeboat finally arrived in Brancaster in November 1892, but at a ceremony on 11 January 1893, the boat was named Alfred S. Genth (ON 332), after another donor's late husband. Soon afterwards, Samuel Bird indicated his disappointment in the naming. To resolve this issue, the new 34-foot lifeboat which arrived at Dunwich in 1894, was named Lily Bird (ON 370), serving from 1894 to 1903.

By 1901, the RNLI was finding it was impossible to maintain a crew at Dunwich, and the station closed temporarily. Dunwich Lifeboat Station closed permanently in 1903. In its place, a second lifeboat was placed at Aldeburgh in 1905.

The site of the station building at Dunwich has been lost to coastal erosion. The lifeboat on station at the time of closure, Lily Bird (ON 370), was transferred to the relief fleet, later serving at Aberystwyth and St Helier.

== Dunwich lifeboats ==
=== Pulling and Sailing (P&S) lifeboats ===
ON (Note: ON is the RNLI's Official Number of the boat.)	Name	Built	On station	Class	Comments
Pre-572	John Keble	1873	1873−1887	30-foot Peake Self-righting (P&S)	(Note: 30-foot x 7-foot 8in (8-oared) Peake-class self-righting (P&S) lifeboat, gift of the family of the Rev. T. Keble of Stroud, built by Forrestt of Limehouse, London, costing £259.)
30	Ann Ferguson	1887	1887−1894	34-foot 3in Self-righting (P&S)	(Note: 34-foot 3in x 7-foot 6in (10-oared) self-righting (P&S) lifeboat, legacy of Mrs A. Ferguson, built by Woolfe of Shadwell, London, costing £328.)
370	Lily Bird	1894	1894−1903	34-foot Self-righting (P&S)	(Note: 34-foot x 8-foot (10-oared) self-righting (P&S) lifeboat, gift of Mr S. Bird of East Cowes, built by Forrestt of Limehouse, London, costing £370.)

Station Closed, 1903

Pre ON numbers are unofficial numbers used by the Lifeboat Enthusiast Society to reference early lifeboats not included on the official RNLI list.

== See also ==
- List of RNLI stations
- List of former RNLI stations
- Royal National Lifeboat Institution lifeboats
