= New Romney Lifeboat Station =

Former RNLI lifeboat station in Kent, England

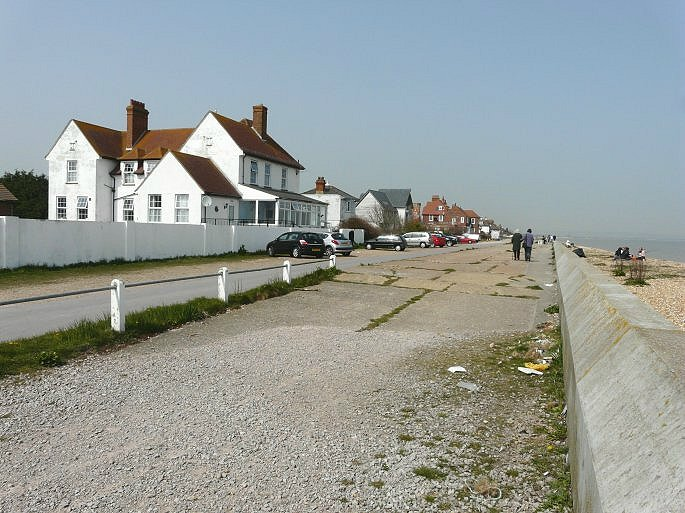
- Site of New Romney lifeboat station, Littlestone on Sea, Kent

- Hythe, Kent
- Former names: Dungeness Lifeboat Station (1871–1874)

General information
- Status: Closed
- Type: RNLI Lifeboat Station
- Location: New Romney, Kent, England
- Coordinates: 50°59′05.7″N 0°58′11.7″E
- Opened: 1874
- Closed: 19 November 1928

New Romney Lifeboat Station was located across the northern end of Marine Parade (now Coast Road), in-between St Andrew's Road and the Coastguard Station, at Littlestone-on-Sea, approximately 1 mile (1.6 km) to the east of New Romney town, on the southern Kent coast.

The Royal National Lifeboat Institution (RNLI) stationed a lifeboat at Littlestone-on-Sea between 1861 and 1928, initially known as Dungeness Lifeboat Station (1861–1874) and then New Romney Lifeboat Station (1874–1928). It was never known as Littlestone-on-Sea Lifeboat Station.

New Romney Lifeboat Station closed in 1928. In 1966, the RNLI established Littlestone-on-Sea Lifeboat Station as an Inshore lifeboat station, but it is actually located at Greatstone-on-Sea.

for further information, please see:–

- Dungeness Lifeboat Station
- Littlestone-on-Sea Lifeboat Station

== History ==
In 1861, in response to the higher number of wrecks happening at Littlestone-on-Sea, the Dungeness lifeboat was relocated, from the station at Dungeness No. 1 Battery, to Littlestone-on-Sea, but still operating as Dungeness Lifeboat Station.

Funds for a new boathouse, and a new lifeboat, Dr. Hatton, were provided in 1871, from the gift of £700 from Mrs, Jane Hatton, in memory of her late husband, Dr. John Hatton.

On 22 January 1873, while at anchor in thick fog 3 miles (4.8 km) off Dungeness, the full-rigged ship Northfleet was rammed by the Murillo. 293 lives were lost. After a careful review by the RNLI, it was decided to once again place a lifeboat at Dungeness.

However, it was decided to retain the station at Littlestone-on Sea, formally becoming New Romney Lifeboat Station in 1874. The Dr. Hatton would also be retained at New Romney.

Dr. Hatton would rescue 10 men from the barque Alliance on 14 December 1874, which was driven ashore whilst on passage from London to Dieppe.

On 10 April 1876, the New Romney lifeboat was called to the aid of the Dutch schooner Tobina, which had run aground at Roar Bank, with seven men aboard. Two men were washed overboard and lost, but after a difficult launch into very poor conditions, excellent seamanship brought the lifeboat to the vessel, and the remaining five crewmen were rescued. In recognition of this rescue, and eight years service, Coxswain Michael Murphy, was awarded the RNLI Silver Medal.

A new lifeboat was placed at New Romney in 1884. This would be the 34-foot 3in self-righting lifeboat Sandal Magna (ON 36), built by Woolfe of Shadwell, London. She was launched to the aid of the Windermere of Newcastle upon Tyne, on passage from London to Yangon (formerly Rangoon), when she was driven ashore at New Romney. All 13 crew were rescued.

In a severe storm on 9 March 1891, the Sandal Magna was launched to the aid of two vessels, the Echo, and the Hugh Barclay, both of Fleetwood, in difficulties off Littlestone. It had taken three attempts to get the boat into the water before she finally got away, such were the conditions, but before the vessels were reached, the lifeboat would be capsized, not once, but three times, finally being washed back on to the beach. Three lifeboatmen were lost, as were both crews of the Echo, and the Hugh Barclay.

New Romney lifeboat James Stevens No. 11 (ON 438) was launched on 21 March 1904 to the aid of the schooner Antje of Geestemunde, which had been driven ashore. Despite difficult conditions, the lifeboat was brought alongside, and rescued the five man crew.

In 1912, the last New Romney lifeboat would be the 35-foot Harry Wright Russell (ON 630), provided from the legacy of the Rev. H. W. Russell of Northfield, Kent. Launched only four times over the next 16 years, no saved lives would be recorded.

New Romney Lifeboat Station was closed on 19 November 1928. The records show 56 launches and 72 lives saved, over a period of 57 years. The boathouse was demolished in 1940 under 'Military Defence Orders'.

The lifeboat on station at the time of closure, Harry Wright Russell (ON 630), was first transferred to Hythe in 1928, to the relief fleet for one-year in 1929, and sold from service in 1935. No further details are known.

== Station honours ==
The following are awards made at New Romney.

- RNLI Silver Medal

Michael Murphy, Chief Boatman, H.M. Coastguard Littlestone, Coxswain – 1876

William Henry Taylor, Labourer – 1891
Edward Standing, Labourer – 1891

- Silver Medal, awarded by The King of Sweden

Each of the crew of the New Romney lifeboat Sandal Magna (ON 36) – 1891

== Roll of honour ==
In memory of those lost whilst serving New Romney lifeboat.

- Lost while assisting the crew, aboard the barque Mary Annway of Liverpool, when it capsized with the loss of all hands, 12 December 1874

Thomas Brice

- On service to the schooners Echo and Hugh Barclay on 9 March 1891

Samuel Hart (33)
William Ryan
Thomas Sullivan (50)

== New Romney lifeboats ==
=== Pulling and Sailing (P&S) lifeboats ===
ON (Note: ON is the RNLI's Official Number of the boat.)	Name	Built	On station	Class	Comments
Pre-558	Dr. Hatton	1871	1874–1884	32-foot Prowse Self-righting (P&S)	(Note: 32-foot x 7-foot 5in (10-oared) Prowse-class self-righting (P&S) lifeboat, gift of Dt Hattons Patients' Fund, built by Woolfe of Shadwell, London, costing £251 when new.)
36	Sandal Magna	1884	1884–1900	34-foot 3in Self-righting (P&S)	(Note: 34-foot 3in x 7-foot 6in (10-oared) self-righting (P&S) lifeboat, gift of Mr D. J. Spawforth of Barbican, built by Woolfe of Shadwell, London.); Capsized 1891.
438	James Stevens No. 11	1899	1900–1912	35-foot Self-righting (P&S)	(Note: 35-foot x 8-foot 6in (10-oared) self-righting (P&S) lifeboat, legacy of Mr J. Stevens of Birmingham, built by Thames Ironworks, of Blackwall, London, costing £823.)
630	Harry Wright Russell	1912	1912–1928	35-foot Self-righting (P&S)	(Note: 35-foot x 8-foot 6in (10-oared) self-righting (P&S) lifeboat, legacy of the Rev. H. W. Russell of Northfleet, built by Thames Ironworks, of Blackwall, London, costing £982.)

Station Closed, 1928

== See also ==
- List of RNLI stations
- List of former RNLI stations
- Royal National Lifeboat Institution lifeboats
