= Lionel Lukin =

British inventor of the lifeboat

- Born: 18 May 1742; Great Dunmow, Essex, England
- Died: 16 February 1834 (aged 91); Hythe, Kent, England
- Known for: Lifeboat

Lionel Lukin (18 May 1742 – 16 February 1834) was a British carriage builder and inventor, noted for the invention of the 'unimmergible' lifeboat.

== Private and professional life ==
Plaque in Seven Dials in London commemorating Lionel Lukin

Lukin was born in Great Dunmow, Essex, on 18 May 1742. He married twice. He had a son and daughter with his first wife, a Miss Walker of Bishops Stortford. His second wife was Heather Clissold of Reading.

He was apprenticed by a local coachbuilder and later established a business at 101 and 102 Long Acre, London. He joined the Worshipful Company of Coachmakers and Coach Harness Makers and eventually became the company's Master.

He had a house in Chelsea and retired to Hythe, Kent, where he took an active interest in matters of the church. He died on 16 February 1834 and is buried at St Leonard's church in Hythe. His gravestone is inscribed: This Lionel Lukin was the first to build a lifeboat, and the original inventor of that principle of safety by which many lives and much property have been preserved from shipwreck, and he obtained for it the King's patent in the year 1785.

== Lifeboats ==
Lukin was granted a patent on 2 November 1785 for an 'unimmergible' boat. The design had increased buoyancy because of sealed air spaces along the side of the boat and in the bow and stern. This enabled it to stay afloat if swamped with water, or when carrying people rescued from the water. A heavy iron keel gave stability. These principles were used in most lifeboats built until the 1960s.

Rather than use the patent to make a profit, he published the design so that everyone could benefit from his ideas. The Royal Humane Society commended him for his "very praiseworthy liberality".

=== Experiment ===
Lukin tried to interest the Royal Navy in his ideas without success. Instead he had a prototype converted from a yawl sailing boat which he purchased in 1784. It was about 20 ft (6.1 m) long and renamed Experiment. Lukin tested it on the River Thames and then loaned it to a pilot at Ramsgate for testing. It was reported to have crossed the English Channel several times in rough weather but was believed impounded on suspicion of being used for smuggling.

=== Witch ===
Lukin's second prototype lifeboat was named Witch, a similar yawl to the Experiment. It was tested at Margate and found to sail well and impossible to sink.

=== Bamburgh Castle ===
A charity in Northumberland asked Lukin to design a lifeboat for them. It was based on the design for a local coble rowing boat and kept at Bamburgh Castle from 1786.

=== Frances Ann ===
The Suffolk Humane Society approached Lukin to design another lifeboat. This was 40 ft (12 m) long and 10 ft (3.0 m) wide. It was used at Lowestoft from 1807. It was the first lifeboat placed in service that was intended to be used under sail (although it also carried 12 oars) and became to forerunner of the Norfolk and Suffolk type that was used at many lifeboat stations on the East Coast for more than 100 years.

== Other inventions ==
The lifeboat was not the only invention to come from Lukin's fertile brain. Other ideas included a stove that could be used on a ship in rough seas, a rain gauge, an adjustable invalid's bed that was adopted in London hospitals, and a raft that could be used to rescue people who had fallen through ice.

== See also ==
- Royal National Lifeboat Institution
- Henry Greathead
- William Wouldhave
