= Ferryside RNLI Lifeboat Station =

Former RNLI lifeboat station in Carmarthenshire, Wales

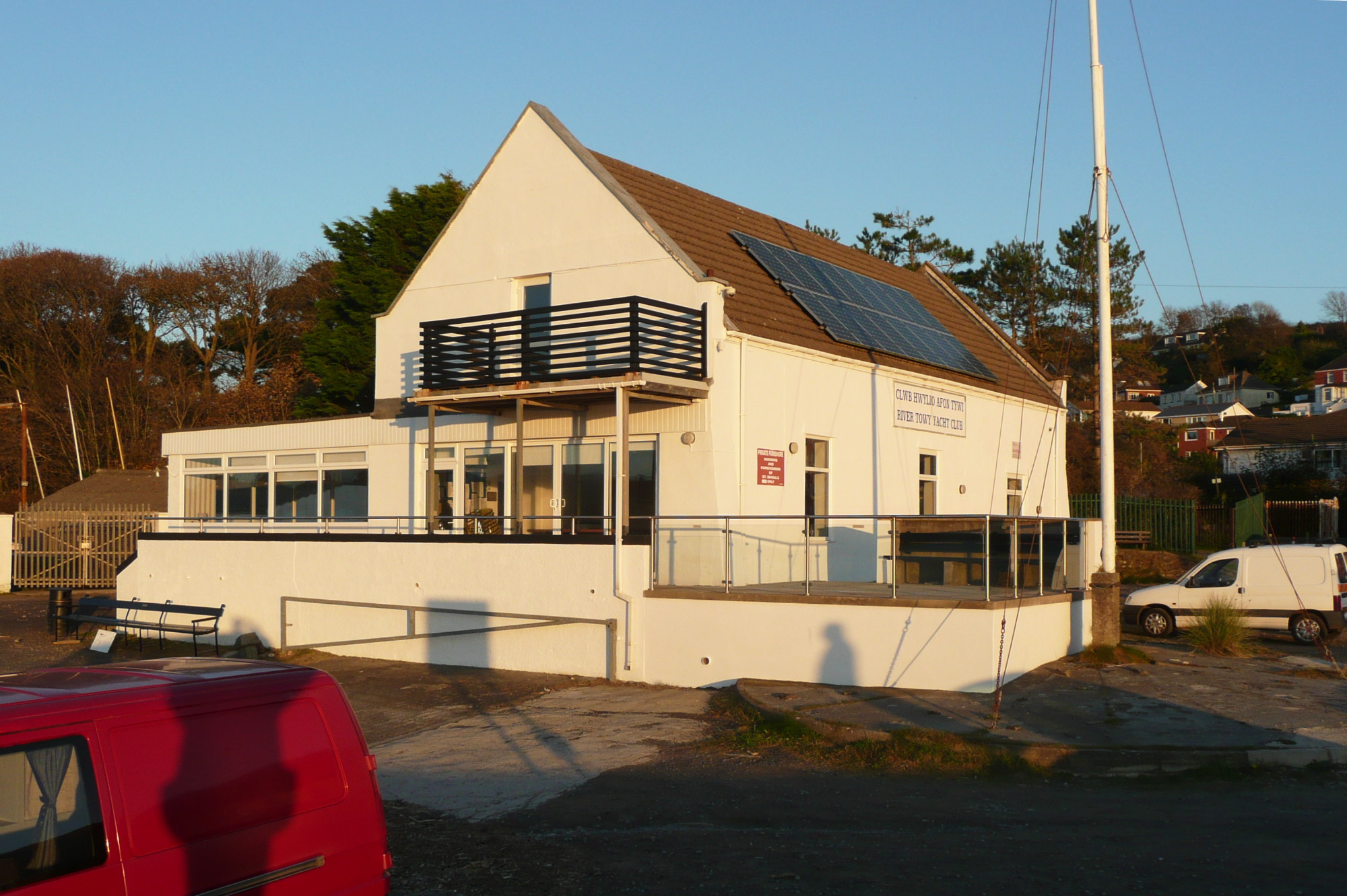
- Former lifeboat house, Ferryside

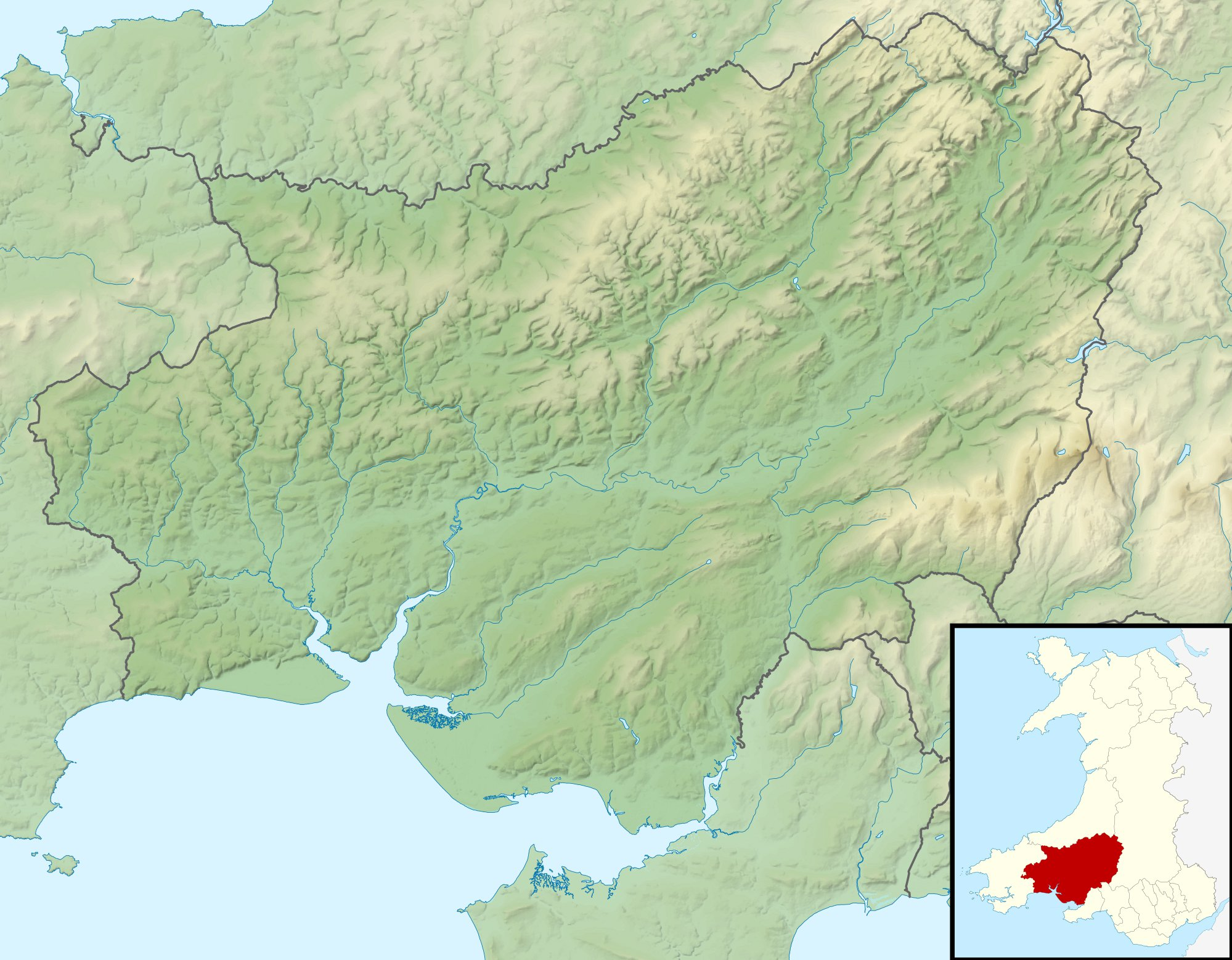
- Location within Carmarthenshire
- Former names: Carmarthen Bay Lifeboat Station

General information
- Status: Closed
- Type: RNLI Lifeboat Station
- Location: Ferryside Beach, Ferryside, St Ishmael, Carmarthenshire, SA17 5SF, Wales
- Coordinates: 51°46′06.4″N 4°22′12.2″W
- Opened: 1835–1843 (RNIPLS); 1860–1960 (RNLI)
- Owner: River Towy Yacht Club

Ferryside RNLI Lifeboat Station, was located at Ferryside Beach in Ferryside, a village in the community of St Ishmael, on the east shore of the River Towy estuary, overlooking Carmarthen Bay, approximately 9 miles (14 km) south-west of Carmarthen, in Carmarthenshire, South Wales.

A lifeboat station was first established at Laugharne in 1835, by the Royal National Institution for the Preservation of Life from Shipwreck (RNIPLS), but was closed in 1843. A new station was established at Ferryside in 1860, by the Royal National Lifeboat Institution (RNLI).

Ferryside RNLI Lifeboat Station closed in 1960.

In the early 1960s, a surge of water-based leisure activity once again showed a need for a rescue service on the River Towy. Ferryside Lifeboat was established in 1966, under the guidance of St John Ambulance Cymru. It is now a 'declared facility' recognised by H.M. Coastguard, one of over seventy independent lifeboats around the shores of the British Isles, and operates as an Independent service.

== History ==
In 1835, the Royal National Institution for the Preservation of Life from Shipwreck (RNIPLS) established Carmarthen Lifeboat Station, on the west side of the River Towy, actually on the River Taf estuary, at Laugharne. A boathouse was constructed at Laugharne, and a 26-foot Palmer-class lifeboat, probably rowing six oars, and built by Harton of Limehouse, London at a cost of £65, was placed at the station. No records of any service have been found. The station was closed in 1843, after the boat was damaged in a storm, and was subsequently condemned and broken up.

After a period of decline, the RNIPLS was re-established as the RNLI in 1854. At a meeting of the RNLI committee of management on Thursday 2 February 1860, it was reported that the new Camarthen Bay Lifeboat Station had been established on the opposite side of the River Towy at Ferryside. A new lifeboat, with its carriage, was transported there free of charge, by the Great Western and South Wales railway companies, arriving on 21 January 1860.

The 30 ft (9.1 m) lifeboat, costing £148-9s-6d, was a self-righting 'Pulling and Sailing' (P&S) lifeboat, one with six oars, single-banked, and sails. Funds for the establishment, construction of a boathouse, and for future maintenance, had been "most liberally contributed" by local donations.

Wrecks frequently occur in Carmarthen Bay; and the establishment of this life-boat will add much to the security of mariners frequenting that part of the coast in the winter months.

— The Life-Boat, Vol. IV, No. 38, 1 October 1860

On 23 December 1863, the Carmarthen Bay lifeboat was launched to the aid of the vessel British India, on passage from Bombay to Liverpool, when it was driven ashore on Cefn Sidan sands in Carmarthen Bay. The lifeboat gave assistance, which saved the vessel and 27 crew, and then stayed with the vessel, until she was safely at anchor.

In July 1864, it was reported that the first lifeboat at Carmarthen Bay was replaced, after showing signs of decay at just 4 years old. The boat was withdrawn, repaired, and relocated to Hornsea, renamed B. Wood. The 'new' Carmarthen Bay lifeboat had previously been in service at Blakeney, as the 6-oared Brightwell, but was withdrawn from there after just two years, as it had been found to be under-powered. This now modified lifeboat rowed 10-oars, double banked, and arrived at Carmarthen Bay with its carriage in May 1864, once again transported free of charge by the Great Western Railway. The funds for the lifeboat were provided from monies collected in Manchester, and the boat was renamed City of Manchester. In total, funds from Manchester would come to provide four lifeboats for Carmarthen Bay lifeboat station.

In gale-force conditions and rough seas, on 15 March 1905, the City of Manchester (ON 56) was launched to the aid of the Norwegian barque Signe of Kristiania, which had been driven ashore at Cefn Sidan sands. On arrival at the vessel, the crew found it impossible to go along side, but the location of the vessel meant that the crew would be able to walk ashore at low water. The lifeboat set out for home, but in view of the conditions, it was decided instead to head for Burry Port. During the course of the journey, the lifeboat was underwater on occasions, and at some point, crewmen were washed overboard, fortunately managing to regain the lifeboat. Coxswain Superintendent David Jones was awarded the RNLI Silver Medal.

On 30 May 1913, in a south-west gale, the four man crew of the trawler Providence of Milford Haven were rescued in Carmarthen Bay, by the crew of the trawler Onyx. The Captain and Third hand of the Onyx were each awarded the RNLI silver medal.

It would be 1941 before Ferryside received their first motor-powered lifeboat, a 35-foot 6in self-righting single-engine lifeboat. The William Maynard (ON 746) was already 10 years old, having served at Cloughey in Northern Ireland since 1931.

By 1960, the need for Ferryside lifeboat had diminished. The River Towy was no longer used commercially, and was suffering from silting. Burry Port had closed, and the port at Llanelli had all but ceased operating. Ferryside Lifeboat Station was closed on 30 June 1960.

In the 125 years since the first station at Laugharne, the lifeboats had been launched 57 times, and saved 94 lives. The station building still stands, currently in use for the River Towy Yacht Club. The Liverpool-class lifeboat on station at the time of closure, Caroline Oates Aver and William Maine (ON 831), was sold from service, and was last reported as a fishing boat in Barmouth in 1969.

The closure came just before there was a surge in water-based leisure activity. The RNLI began to introduce small inshore lifeboats at strategic locations, which could be launched quickly, with just a handful of people. In other areas, independent lifeboats began to be established. Ferryside Lifeboat was established in 1966, and still operates today.

== Station honours ==
The following are awards made at Ferryside.

- RNLI Silver Medal
  David Jones, Coxswain Superintendent – 1905
  William W. Peddle, Captain of the trawler Onyx – 1913
  Andrew Seaward, Third hand of the trawler Onyx – 1913

== Carmarthen RNIPLS lifeboat ==
ON (Note: ON is the RNLI's Official Number of the boat.)	Name	Built	On station	Class	Comments
Pre-165	Unnamed	1834	1835–1843	26-foot Palmer	(Note: ~26-foot (6-oared) Palmer-class non-self-righting lifeboat, funded by the RNIPLS, built by Harton of Limehouse, London, costing £65.); Condemned and broken up in 1843.

Pre ON numbers are unofficial numbers used by the Lifeboat Enthusiast Society to reference early lifeboats not included on the official RNLI list.

== Carmarthen Bay / Ferryside RNLI lifeboats ==
=== Pulling and Sailing (P&S) lifeboats ===
ON	Name	Built	On station	Class	Comments
Pre-350	Unnamed	1859	1860–1864	30-foot Peake self-righting (P&S)	(Note: 30 ft 0 in (9.14 m) x 6 ft 6 in (1.98 m) (6-oared) Peake-class self-righting (P&S) lifeboat, from RNLI funds, built by Forrestt of Limehouse, London, costing £148.); Transferred to Hornsea.
Pre-394	City of Manchester	1862	1864–1875	30-foot Peake self-righting (P&S)	(Note: 30 ft 0 in (9.14 m) x 7 ft 0 in (2.13 m) (10-oared) Peake-class self-righting (P&S) lifeboat, gift of the Manchester branch of the RNLI, via R. Whitworth, built by Forrestt of Limehouse, London, costing £160 when new.); Previously Brightwell at Blakeney. Returned to London in 1875.
Pre-516	City of Manchester	1868	1875–1879	32-foot Prowse self-righting (P&S)	(Note: 32 ft 0 in (9.75 m) x 7 ft 6 in (2.29 m) (10-oared) Prowse-class self-righting (P&S) lifeboat, gift of the Manchester LB fund, built by Woolfe of Shadwell, London, costing £247 when new.); Previously George Gay at Penarth. Broken up in 1879.
Pre-642	City of Manchester	1879	1879–1885	32-foot Prowse self-righting (P&S)	(Note: 32 ft 0 in (9.75 m) x 7 ft 6 in (2.29 m) (10-oared) Prowse-class self-righting (P&S) lifeboat, gift of the Manchester LB fund, built by Woolfe of Shadwell, London, costing £282.); Transferred to Bamburgh Castle.
56	City of Manchester	1885	1885–1907	37-foot self-righting (P&S)	(Note: 37 ft 0 in (11.28 m) x 8 ft 0 in (2.44 m) (12-oared) self-righting (P&S) lifeboat, gift of the Manchester LB fund, built by Forrestt of Limehouse, London, costing £384.); Condemned in 1907, and broken up in 1908.
584	Richard Ashley	1907	1907–1941	37-foot 6in self-righting (P&S)	(Note: 37 ft 6 in (11.43 m) x 9 ft 3 in (2.82 m) (12-oared) self-righting (P&S) lifeboat, legacy of Mr C. C. Ashley of Menton, France, built by Thames Ironworks of Blackwall, London, costing £1,066.); Sold in 1941. Renamed Falcon. Last reported at Ffrith, North Wales, March 2024.

=== Motor lifeboats ===
ON	Name	Built	On station	Class	Comments
746	William Maynard	1931	1941–1948	35-foot 6in self-righting (motor)	Previously at Cloughey. Transferred to Whitehills.
831	Caroline Oates Aver and William Maine	1939	1948–1960	Liverpool	Previously at St Ives

More post-service details can be found on the respective lifeboat class pages.

== See also ==
- List of RNLI stations
- List of former RNLI stations
- Independent lifeboats in Britain and Ireland
- Royal National Lifeboat Institution lifeboats
