= Dungeness Lifeboat Station =

RNLI lifeboat station in Kent, England

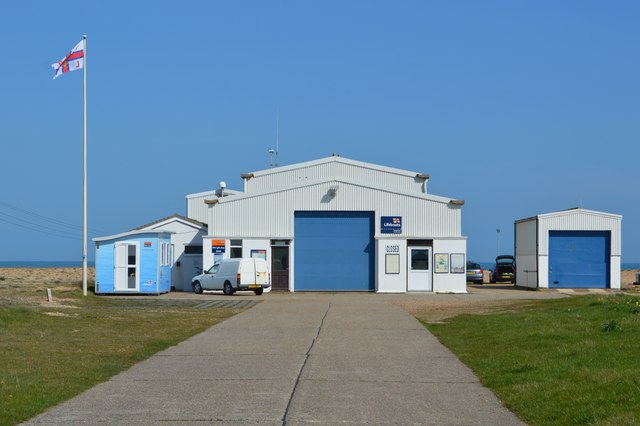
- Dungeness Lifeboat Station

- Location within Kent
- Former names: Dungeness No.27 Tower; Dymchurch; Lydd (Dungeness)

General information
- Type: RNLI Lifeboat Station
- Location: Dungeness Rd, Dungeness, Kent, TN29 9NE, England
- Coordinates: 50°55′35.3″N 0°58′34.9″E
- Opened: 1826–1838 / 1854–
- Owner: Royal National Lifeboat Institution

Website
- Dungeness RNLI Lifeboat Station

Dungeness Lifeboat Station is located on Dungeness Road, about 3.5 miles (5.6 km) south-east of the town of Lydd, on the cuspate foreland of Dungeness, on the Kent coast.

A lifeboat was first stationed at Dungeness in 1826, supplied by the Royal National Institution for the Preservation of Life from Shipwreck (RNIPLS), and managed by the Dover and District Lifeboat Association.

The station is currently one of 237 Royal National Lifeboat Institution (RNLI) lifeboat stations, and operates the Shannon-class All-weather lifeboat, 13-02 The Morrell (ON 1309), launched using the Shannon Launch and Recovery System (SLARS).

== History ==
In August 1824, just three months after the formation of the RNIPLS, Major-General Bowles of the Coast Blockade for the Suppression of Smuggling, which was run by the Admiralty from a chain of Martello towers on the Kent and Sussex coast, requested the placement of a lifeboat at Dungeness. This was agreed, and a 20-foot 6-oared non-self-righting lifeboat was ordered from William Plenty of Newbury, Berkshire, arriving on 30 August 1826. Stationed at Martello tower No.27, (51°00′42.6″N 0°58′57.5″E), the station was named Dungeness No.27 Tower.

The first service of the lifeboat was in a severe gale on 27 August 1832. Launched the aid of the Richmond which had run aground, the lifeboat then spotted the brig Osiris, on passage from Ostend to Liverpool, which was also in trouble nearby. When she too ran aground, the crew of 10 managed to get aboard the Richmond, and were rescued from there by the lifeboat. The master of the Richmond declined assistance. Lt. Frederick John Francis Henslow, RN, of H.M. Coastguard was awarded the RNIPLS Silver Medal.

In 1836, the lifeboat was badly damaged on service, and had to be withdrawn. A replacement Palmer-type lifeboat, built by Harton, arrived at the station on 12 December 1836. The station name was then changed to Dymchurch Lifeboat Station. This lifeboat station would close just 2 years later in 1838, the new boat having never been launched on service. Martello tower no.27 was demolished in 1841.

In the following few years without an official lifeboat, rescues were still carried out by the men from H.M. Coastguard, and no fewer than six Silver Medals were awarded.

During a violent storm of 27 December 1852, a day which claimed at least 85 vessels, see Shipwrecks 27 December 1852, coastguard men rescued 39 people from the barque Louisa and Emelia of Hamburg, but 45 people were lost.

As a result of this disaster, the RNIPLS decided to reopen a station at Dungeness. A site for a boathouse was provided by H.M. Board of Ordnance at the Dungeness No.1 Battery, which was constructed at a cost of £97-6s-0d. A 27-foot self-righting 'Pulling and Sailing' (P&S) lifeboat, one with sails and (8) oars, costing £137, was built by Forrestt of Limehouse, along with a carriage from Ransome and Simms, costing a further £170. Both arrived on station on 25 March 1854, the station being named Dungeness Lifeboat Station.

The service of this boat was very short. Launched just once, and ultimately not required that day, the 2-ton boat was found to be too heavy and difficult to launch, in that location. A replacement boat was ordered, a slightly longer, but much lighter, 28-foot 6-oared lifeboat, weighing just 1 ton 5 cwts, arriving in January 1857. On 5 October 1854, the RNIPLS formally changed name to become the RNLI.

Of course, the replacement lifeboat was found to be too light for the sea conditions, On her first call on 19 October 1858, the lifeboat launched to the schooner Jane May, but found the casualty vessel abandoned. Returning to shore, the lifeboat was capsized, but fortunately no-one was lost.

This lightweight boat would be replaced in 1861. Providence was a 30-foot (6-oared) self-righting (P&S) lifeboat, built by Forrestt of Limehouse. To resolve the launching issue with a heavier boat, the station was relocated to Littlestone-on-Sea. The boathouse at No.1 Battery was dismantled and rebuilt at Littlestone, but the station retained the name Dungeness Lifeboat Station.

The first call for the Providence was to the barque Cruz V of Portugal, on passage from Hamburg to Porto, when she was driven ashore at Dungeness point. Battling 4 miles (6.4 km) through rough seas, the lifeboat rescued all 14 men from the vessel.

During a severe gale of 6 January 1867, the French lugger Courrier, on passage from Dunkerque to Dieppe, ran aground off Dymchurch. In the rough conditions, the 6-oared Dungeness lifeboat Providence had been unable to reach the wreck. Three crew were lost, but through the efforts of the Rev. Charles Cobb, and Coastguard John Batist, who waded out into the sea, one man was rescued. Both men would receive awards for gallantry.

RNLI Inspector of Lifeboats, Capt. John Ward, visited the station on 11 January 1867 to investigate the incident. Having been too heavy to launch, too light for the conditions, and then relocated, he concluded that the Dungeness lifeboat still wasn't good enough, and a more powerful lifeboat was required; in other words, one with more oars, and more manpower.

Funds for a new boat and boathouse had been provided from a gift of £700 from Mrs, Jane Hatton, in memory of her late husband, Dr. John Hatton.

In July 1871, a new 32-foot 10-oared lifeboat, was transported to Littlestone-on-Sea, where a new boathouse, costing £266-1s-0d, had been constructed at the end of Marine Parade, next to the coastguard station. After a service of dedication by Rev. R. Smith, vicar of New Romney, the boat was named Dr. Hatton.

On 22 January 1873, while at anchor in thick fog 3 miles (4.8 km) off Dungeness, the full-rigged ship Northfleet was rammed by the Murillo. 293 lives were lost.

After a careful review by the RNLI, it was decided to once again place a lifeboat at Dungeness. A new station, Lydd (Dungeness) Lifeboat Station, was created near Lydd-on-Sea, with a boathouse constructed by W. Robins, costing £277-1s-0d, on land provided by Sir Henry Tufton, Bt. A 33-foot 10-oared lifeboat arrived on 9 September, and the station was formally opened on 14 September 1874, with the boat being named David Hulett after a gift to the Institution. The station at Littlestone-on Sea would be retained. and renamed 'New Romney Lifeboat Station'.

On service to the brigantine Aeolus of Sweden on 11 November 1891, the Lydd (Dungeness) lifeboat R. A. O. B. (ON 130) capsized, throwing out five lifeboat men. Three men were quickly recovered, but Henry Reeves and Daniel Nichol were lost. The crew of the Aeolus were rescued by the New Romney lifeboat. James Lucas, Coxswain of the R. A. O. B., was awarded the RNLI Silver Medal. Both crews were awarded silver medals by The King of Sweden.

On 25 November 1891, following the capsize of both the Lydd (Dungeness) and the Hythe, Sandgate & Folkestone lifeboats, which had cost the life of a lifeboatman, it was decided to place a second larger No. 2 lifeboat at the Lydd (Dungeness) station. On 13 October 1892, the station name was changed back to Dungeness Lifeboat Station. A 44-foot 12-oared lifeboat constructed by Woolfe, Thomas Wilcox (ON 312), arrived at Lydd (Dungeness) No.2 station on 29 December 1892, and was moored afloat.

In 1894, it was decided to bring the 44-foot Thomas Wilcox ashore. To assist launching in different locations, the boat was mounted on a rail carriage, and could be transport along 1 mile (1.6 km) of special railway track, that was constructed from a point near the old lighthouse, past the Britannia Inn. The total cost was £1,494-3s-4d. The system was short lived. Thomas Wilcox was launched for the first time five years later, on 30 December 1899. By 1905, the system had been abandoned, and hard-standing was created for the lifeboat, which remained outside. In 1912, the hard-standing, now with a turntable, was relocated nearer to the water, following a build up of shingle.

A motor-powered lifeboat would be placed at the No.2 station in 1931. Charles Cooper Henderson (ON 761) was a 41-foot Beach Type, constructed by Groves and Guttridge, capable of 7.66 knots. It was decided to build a boathouse for this larger boat, costing £1,934-13s-10d, and Charles Cooper Henderson was removed from the station during construction in April 1938, returning to Dungeness on 12 January 1939. On 31 March 1939, the No.1 Station boat Mary Theresa Boileau (ON 635) was withdrawn, and the No.1 station was closed. The No.2 station then became the primary station.

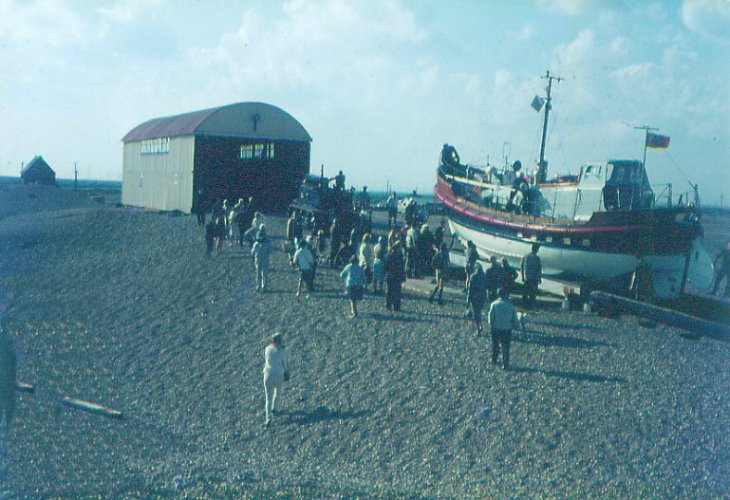
Dungeness lifeboat station in 1968 (photo: John Baker)

With the ever moving shingle on the coast at Dungeness, in 1977, the station was moved once again. A new boathouse was constructed just to the south of Lydd-on-Sea, at a cost of £45,000. For the first time, the lifeboat was kept on a special launching carriage, pulled by a Talus MBC Case 1150B Amphibious Tractor (T85). A new Rother-class lifeboat, 37-35 Alice Upjohn (ON 1048), arrived on station on 23 September 1977, but whilst training on launch procedures took place, the 42-foot Watson-class lifeboat Mabel E. Holland (ON 937) remained on service, finally departing on 27 January 1979.

Between 1992 and 2014, the station operated the Mersey-class lifeboat 12-27 Pride and Spirit (ON 1186). In 2014, the station was one of the first to receive the new Shannon-class lifeboats. 13-02 The Morrell (ON 1309), which cost in the region of £2.2M, is launched with a special tractor and trailer system known as the Shannon Launch and Recovery System (SLARS).

== Station honours ==
The following are awards made at Dungeness.

- Albert Medal First Class (Gold)

Rev. Charles Cobb, MA, Rector of Dymchurch – 1867

- Albert Medal Second Class (Silver)

John Batist, Boatman, H.M. Coastguard Dymchurch – 1867

- RNIPLS Gold Medal

Lt. John Somerville, RN, H.M. Coastguard Littlestone-on-Sea – 1835

- RNLI Gold Medal

Rev. Charles Cobb, MA, Rector of Dymchurch – 1867

- RNIPLS Silver Medal

Lt. Frederick John Francis Henslow, RN, H.M. Coastguard – 1832

Lt. William Pedder, RN, H.M. Coastguard Dungeness – 1835

Lt. Matthew Combe, RN, Chief Officer, H.M. Coastguard No. 2 Battery Dungeness – 1845

John Wilcox, Chief Officer, H.M. Coastguard Lydd – 1851
Thomas Rivers, Boatman, H.M. Coastguard Lydd – 1851

Arthur Brookes, Chief Boatman, H.M. Coastguard Dungeness – 1853
John Sims, Boatman, H.M. Coastguard Dungeness – 1853

- RNLI Silver Medal

Peter Smith, Chief Boatman, H.M. Coastguard Lydd – 1859

John Batist, Boatman, H.M. Coastguard Dymchurch – 1867

Richard Billett, Chief Boatman, H.M. Coastguard, Coxswain – 1876

James Lucas, Coxswain – 1891

Tom Richard Tart, Coxswain – 1974

Gary Clark, crew member – 2012

- Silver Medal, awarded by The King of Sweden

Each of the crew of the Lydd (Dungeness) Lifeboat R. A. O. B. (ON 130) – 1891

- The Maud Smith Award 1974
  (for the bravest act of lifesaving during the year by a member of a lifeboat crew)

Tom Richard Tart, Coxswain – 1974

- RNLI Bronze Medal

Douglas Oiller, Coxswain – 1929

George Tart, Coxswain – 1956

Peter Edward Thomas, Assistant Mechanic – 1974

- The Thanks of the Institution inscribed on Vellum

Joseph Oiller, Second Coxswain – 1929
Tom Tart, Bowman – 1929
Percy Oiller – 1929
John Bignall – 1929
George Tart – 1929
George Haines – 1929
John Oiller – 1929
John W. Oiller – 1929
William Tart – 1929
Edwin Fair – 1929

Douglas Oiller, Coxswain – 1932
The Women of Dungeness – 1932

Alexander Oiller – 1956
W. Thomas – 1956

George Tart, Coxswain – 1962

Albert Haines, Second Coxswain – 1974
Alec Clements, Motor Mechanic – 1974
William Richardson – 1974
Colin Haines – 1974
Arthur Oiller – 1974

Mark Richardson, Deputy Second Coxswain – 2012
Trevor Bunney, Mechanic/Deputy Second Coxswain – 2012

- A Framed Letter of Thanks signed by the Chairman of the Institution

William Richardson, Coxswain – 1991
Kenneth Coleman, Tractor Driver – 1991

- A Collective Letter of Thanks signed by the Chairman of the Institution

William Richardson, Coxswain and the crew of the Dungeness Lifeboat – 1991

- British Empire Medal

Judith Ann Richardson, Lifeboat Press Officer – 2023KBH

== Roll of honour ==
In memory of those lost whilst serving at Dungeness.

- Lost when the coastguard boat capsized, on service to the Alice Maud, 29 April 1852

T. Fletcher
P. Light
T. Noble
Unknown

- Washed overboard and lost from the coastguard galley, on service to the schooner Elizabeth Alice of Cardiff, 10 February 1889

George Laddick Hamlin (39)

- Lost when the lifeboat R. A. O. B. (ON 130) capsized on service to the brigantine Aeolus of Sweden, 11 November 1891

Henry Reeves (34)
Daniel Nichol (41)

- Drowned when the lifeboat R. A. O. B. (ON 130) capsized, on service to the barque Joanne Marie of Christiania, 20 November 1893.

John Stephen Jarrett, Second Coxswain (32)

== Dungeness lifeboats ==
=== Dungeness (No. 27 Tower) / Dymchurch (from 1836) ===
ON (Note: ON is the RNLI's Official Number of the boat.)	Name	Built	On station	Class	Comments
Pre-121	Unnamed	1826	1826−1836	20-foot Plenty Non-self-righting	(Note: 20-foot x 6-foot 9in (6-oared) Plenty-class non-self-righting lifeboat, built by William Plenty of Newbury, Berkshire, costing £100.); Damaged October 1836.
Pre-161	Unnamed	1833	1836−1838	25-foot Palmer Non-self-righting	(Note: 25-foot x 5-foot 9in (6-oared) Palmer-class non-self-righting lifeboat, built by Harton of Limehouse, London, costing £60.)

Station Closed, 1838
Pre ON numbers are unofficial numbers used by the Lifeboat Enthusiast Society to reference early lifeboats not included on the official RNLI list.

=== Dungeness (No. 1 Battery) ===
ON	Name	Built	On station	Class	Comments
Pre-278	Unnamed	1854	1854−1856	27-foot Peake Self-righting	(Note: 27-foot x 7-foot 6in (8-oared) Peake-class self-righting (P&S) lifeboat, built by Forrestt of Limehouse, London, costing £137.); Too heavy for station.
Pre-304	Unnamed	1856	1857−1861	28-foot Peake Self-righting (P&S)	(Note: 28-foot x 6-foot (6-oared) Peake-class self-righting (P&S) lifeboat, built by Forrestt of Limehouse, London, costing £140.); Capsized 19 October 1858. Later named Brave Robert Sheddon at Kingsgate.

Station Closed, 1861

=== Dungeness (Littlestone) ===
ON	Name	Built	On station	Class	Comments
Pre-372	Providence	1860	1861−1871	30-foot Peake Self-righting (P&S)	(Note: 30-foot x 7-foot (6-oared) Peake-class self-righting (P&S) lifeboat, gift of the Rev. H. J. Hutcheson of Canterbury, built by Forrestt of Limehouse, London, costing £158.)
Pre-558	Dr. Hatton	1871	1871–1874	32-foot Prowse Self-righting (P&S)	(Note: 32-foot x 7-foot 6in (10-oared) Prowse-class self-righting (P&S) lifeboat, gift of Dr Hatton's LB fund, built by Woolfe of Shadwell, London, costing £251.)

Station renamed New Romney Lifeboat Station in 1874

=== Lydd (Dungeness) / Dungeness (from 1892) ===
==== No.1 Station ====
ON	Name	Built	On station	Class	Comments
Pre-583	David Hulett	1874	1874–1887	33-foot Peake Self-righting (P&S)	(Note: 33-foot x 7-foot 10in (10-oared) self-righting (P&S) lifeboat, gift of Mr D. Hulett of London, built by Forrestt of Limehouse, London, costing £308.)
130	R. A. O. B.	1887	1887–1894	34-foot Self-righting (P&S)	(Note: 34-foot x 7-foot 6in (10-oared) self-righting (P&S) lifeboat, gift of the Royal Antediluvian Order of Buffaloes, built by Forrestt of Limehouse, London, costing £440.); Capsized 1891 and 1893.
374	R. A. O. B.	1894	1894–1912	34-foot Rubie Self-righting (P&S)	(Note: 34-foot x 8-foot (10-oared) Dungeness-class (Rubie) self-righting (P&S) lifeboat, gift of the Royal Antediluvian Order of Buffaloes, built by Forrestt of Limehouse, London, costing £287.)
635	Mary Theresa Boileau	1912	1912–1939	34-foot Rubie Self-righting (P&S)	(Note: 34-foot x 8-foot (10-oared) Dungeness-class (Rubie) self-righting (P&S) lifeboat, gift of Miss M. Rumann of Torquay, built by Thames Ironworks of Blackwall, London, costing £937.)

Station Closed, 1939

==== No.2 Station ====
ON	Name	Built	On station	Class	Comments
312	Thomas Simcox	1891	1892–1915	44-foot Self-righting (P&S)	(Note: 44-foot x 11-foot (12-oared) self-righting (P&S) lifeboat, gift of Mrs T. Simcox of Edgbaston, built by Woolfe of Shadwell, London, costing £788.); Took part in the Lowestoft sailing trials, Mar–May 1915.
644	David Barclay of Tottenham	1915	1915–1933	42-foot Self-righting (P&S)	(Note: 42-foot x 11-foot 4in (12-oared) self-righting (P&S), legacy of Mrs J. S. Barclay of Tottenham, constructed by Thames Ironworks, of Blackwall, London, completed by S. E. Saunders of Cowes, costing £2,502.)
761	Charles Cooper Henderson	1933	1933–1938	41-foot Beach Type	(Note: 41-foot Watson-class non-self-righting lifeboat, legacy of Mr Henderson, built by Groves and Guttridge of Cowes, with twin 35–hp Weyburn AE6 engines, delivering 7.66 knots, and costing £5,705.)

No.2 Station closed for reconstruction work in 1938, reopening as the primary station in 1939.

==== Dungeness ====
ON	Op.No. (Note: Op. No. is the RNLI's Operational Number of the boat carried on the hull.)	Name	Built	On station	Class	Comments
761	–	Charles Cooper Henderson	1933	1939–1957	41-foot Beach Type	
937	–	Mabel E. Holland	1957	1957–1979	42-foot Watson	
1048	37-35	Alice Upjohn	1977	1977–1992	Rother	
1186	12-27	Pride and Spirit	1992	1992–2014	Mersey	
1309	13-02	The Morrell	2013	2014–	Shannon	

=== Launch and recovery tractors ===
Op. No.	Reg. No.	Type	On station	Comments
T85	SEL 394R	Talus MBC Case 1150B	1977–1985	
T95	B188 GAW	Talus MB-H Crawler	1985–1996	
T93	A496 CUX	Talus MB-H Crawler	1996–2005	
T116	K920 DUJ	Talus MB-H Crawler	2005–2014	
SC-T03	HK63 BVW	SLARS (Supacat)	2014–	

== See also ==
- List of RNLI stations
- List of former RNLI stations
- Royal National Lifeboat Institution lifeboats
