= Kingsgate Lifeboat Station =

Former RNLI lifeboat station in Kent, England

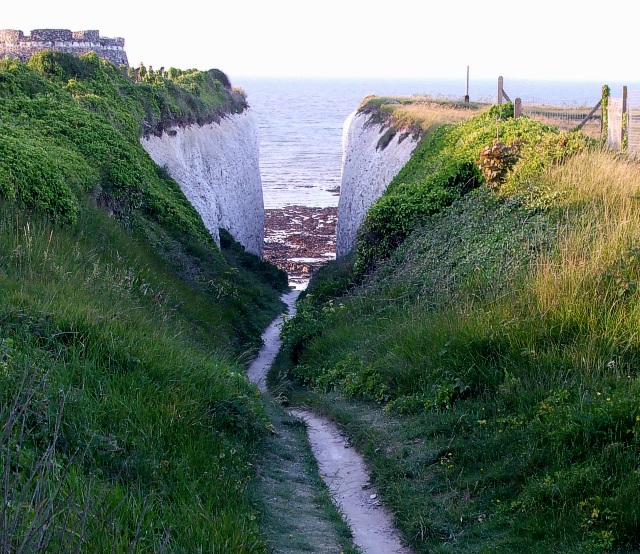
- White Ness Gap, Kingsgate, Kent

- Kingsgate, Kent

General information
- Status: Closed
- Type: RNLI Lifeboat Station
- Location: Whiteness Gap, Kingsgate, Kent, England
- Coordinates: 51°23′11.5″N 1°26′28.0″E
- Opened: 1862
- Closed: 1897

Kingsgate Lifeboat Station was first located at the top of the cliffs at White Ness Gap, alongside the Neptune Tower, near the Captain Digby Inn, at Kingsgate in the county of Kent.

A lifeboat station was established at Kingsgate in 1862 by the Royal National Lifeboat Institution (RNLI)

In 1883, the station was moved to a new boathouse, constructed at the top of the cliffs at the end of Botany Road, Botany Bay, Kingsgate.

Kingsgate lifeboat station was closed in 1897.

== History ==
In 1860, the RNLI decided to open a station at Kingsgate. Close to the coastguard station, where a crew would be found, a narrow naturally formed gap, White Ness Gap, cut through the cliffs leading down to the beach. A site for a boathouse was leased from a local landowner, on the headland at the top of the gap between Neptune Tower and the Captain Digby Inn. Due to the issues of access, and considering that the boat would need to be manhandled up and down the steep narrow gap, it was decided that a smaller (and lighter) boat was more suitable for the location.

A 28-foot self-righting Peake-class lifeboat, built for Dungeness Lifeboat Station in 1856, had been found to be too lightweight for the conditions encountered there. The boat was transported from London to Margate free of charge by the South Eastern Railway Company, and arrived at Kingsgate on 16 January 1862. The boat was named Brave Robert Sheddon, funded from the legacy of the late Wilhelmina Shedden-Watson.

When trials were undertaken in June 1862, it was discovered that the boat did not readily self-right when capsized. In April 1863, the Brave Robert Sheddon was withdrawn, without ever having been launched on service, and was later broken up. The boat was replaced by another 28-foot lifeboat, Mermaid, previously at Appledore, and was renamed Brave Robert Sheddon.

After a number of launches when the lifeboat was ultimately not required, the first effective service was made on the 11 January 1866, to the brig Fre Mad of Norway, driven ashore at Kingsgate, whilst on passage from London to Messina, Sicily. The Kingsgate lifeboat rescued all seven crew. The brig was later re-floated and towed to London.

In 1870, the first brand new boat was placed on station. Constructed by Forrestt of Limehouse, the boat was especially narrow to assist with launching down the gap, having a beam of just 5-foot 8in, at least 4in less than most other lifeboats. Costing £210, she was provided out of RNLI funds, and named Thomas Chapman after the Deputy Chairman of the Institution. A special two-wheeled carriage was also provided.

On the 22 February 1880, the Kingsdown lifeboat was launched to the aid of the ketch Forager of Portsmouth, which had been driven ashore. A coastguard boat had been launched to try to help refloat the vessel, but their efforts were unsuccessful. When the weather worsened, the lifeboat launched. After 3 hours effort, the Forager was refloated, but found to be leaking badly. A steam-tug then towed the vessel to Ramsgate harbour, with the lifeboat tied at the stern of the vessel to assist steering, saving the boat and 4 crew.

In 1880, another new 28-foot lifeboat was constructed for Kingsgate, this time by Woolfe of Shadwell. Rather than being made narrow, the boat was of standard size, and work was carried out on the cliffs to widen the gap to the beach. The boat was again provided from RNLI funds, and again named Thomas Chapman. The boat would only be launched once on service, to reports of a vessel on Longnose reef, but nothing was found.

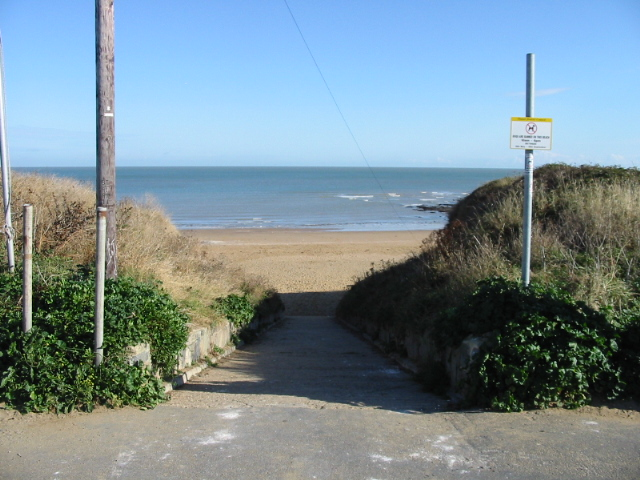
Path down to the beach, Botany Bay, Kent

A new boathouse, costing £242, was constructed in 1883, just 1/2 mile (0.80 km) further north along the coast, on the cliff at Botany Bay beach. This could accommodate a bigger boat, and on 7 September 1889, a 31-foot lifeboat built by Forrestt was placed at the station, once again provided from RNLI funds, and again named Thomas Chapman (ON 251). The boat would be on station for eight years, but was only launched four times, and no rescues were effected.

By 1897, finding a crew was getting increasingly difficult. With plans to place a second lifeboat at Margate imminent, and another lifeboat at Broadstairs just 3 miles (4.8 km) to the south, the decision was taken to close the station.

Kingsgate Lifeboat Station was closed on 30 June 1897. In a period of 35 years, the lifeboat had been launched 19 times, and saved 11 lives. The lifeboat Thomas Chapman (ON 251) was sold locally. The boathouse at Botany Bay remained standing until 1961, when it was demolished.

== Kingsgate lifeboats ==
=== Pulling and Sailing (P&S) lifeboats ===
ON (Note: ON is the RNLI's Official Number of the boat.)	Name	Built	On station	Class	Comments
Pre-304	Brave Robert Sheddon	1856	1862–1863	28-foot Peake Self-righting (P&S)	(Note: 28–foot x 6-foot (6-oared) Peake-class self-righting (P&S) lifeboat, legacy of Mrs Sheddon-Watson, built by Forrestt of Limehouse, London, costing £140 when new.); Previously Unnamed at Dungeness
Pre-302	Brave Robert Sheddon	1856	1863–1869	28-foot Peake Self-righting (P&S)	(Note: 28–foot x 6-foot (6-oared) Peake-class self-righting (P&S) lifeboat, legacy of Mrs Sheddon-Watson, built by Forrestt of Limehouse, London, costing £126 when new.); Previously Mermaid at Appledore.
Pre-539	Thomas Chapman	1869	1869–1880	28-foot Peake Self-righting (P&S)	(Note: 28–foot x 5-foot 8in (6-oared) Peake-class self-righting (P&S) lifeboat, from RNLI funds, built by Forrestt of Limehouse, London, costing £196.)
Pre-654	Thomas Chapman	1880	1880–1889	28-foot Self-righting (P&S)	(Note: 28–foot x 7-foot 2in (8-oared) self-righting (P&S) lifeboat, from RNLI funds, built by Woolfe of Shadwell, London, costing £265.)
251	Thomas Chapman	1889	1889–1897	31-foot Self-righting (P&S)	(Note: 31–foot x 7-foot 3in (10-oared) self-righting (P&S) lifeboat, from RNLI funds, built by Forrestt of Limehouse, London, costing £301.)

Pre ON numbers are unofficial numbers used by the Lifeboat Enthusiast Society to reference early lifeboats not included on the official RNLI list.

== See also ==
- List of RNLI stations
- List of former RNLI stations
- Royal National Lifeboat Institution lifeboats
