= Brancaster Lifeboat Station =

Former RNLI lifeboat station in Norfolk, England

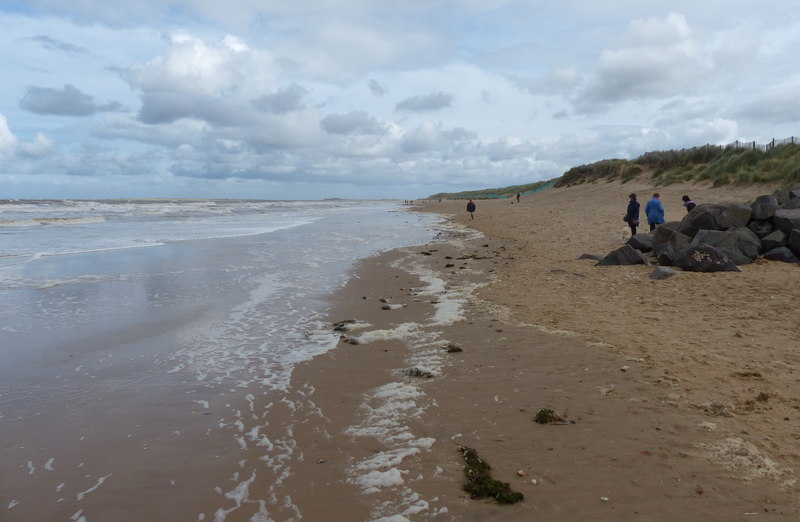
- Brancaster Beach

- Location within Norfolk

General information
- Status: Closed
- Type: RNLI Lifeboat Station
- Location: Brancaster, Norfolk, England
- Coordinates: 52°58′28.8″N 0°38′21.2″E
- Opened: 1874
- Closed: 1935

Brancaster Lifeboat Station was located at Brancaster Beach, near the village of Brancaster, on the north coast of the county of Norfolk.

It is recorded that in 1823, the Norfolk Association for Saving the Lives of Shipwrecked Mariners (NASLSM) decided to place a lifeboat at Brancaster, but there are no records of a boat in their annual report, nor any service records.

A lifeboat was placed at Brancaster by the Royal National Lifeboat Institution (RNLI), who opened a station there in 1874. The station was closed in 1935.

== History ==
Following a number of shipwrecks on the Norfolk coast, including the Alexandrine of Caen, Rev, Kerslake of Burnham Deepdale, and local merchant and ship owner Mr Dewing, wrote to the RNLI in 1872, requesting a lifeboat be placed at Brancaster, to cover the gap of 15 miles (24 km) between to the two flanking lifeboat stations of Hunstanton and Wells-next-the-Sea, being situated mid-way between the two.

Brancaster was visited by the RNLI Inspector in 1873, and having learned that sufficient crew would be available, and that a local committee had been formed to raise funds for the upkeep, a station was agreed. A 33-foot 'pulling and sailing' (P&S) lifeboat, one with oars and sails, was ordered from Woolfe of Shadwell, along with a launching carriage from Robinson & Napton. Local landowner and committee chairman Simms Reeve offer a plot of land, and a 45-foot long boathouse was constructed by Becton Brothers, for £268-10s-0d.

The lifeboat and carriage were transported to Hunstanton free of charge by the Great Eastern Railway Company, arriving in Brancaster by road on 30 Jun 1874. At a ceremony on 1 July 1874, the boat was named Joseph and Mary (ON 256). However, in 1879, it was decided to assign that name to a boat to be placed at Poole Lifeboat Station, and the Brancaster boat was renamed Lily Bird, attributed to the gift of £600 from Samuel Bird of Belsize Park, London, for a Norfolk or Suffolk Lifeboat. As it wasn't a new boat, Mr Bird was assured that the name would be carried forward to a future replacement.

On passage from Arendal to Cardiff, the Norwegian barque Lydia became stranded on Burnham Flats. With increasing depth of water in the hold, 14 men were rescued. The following day, in better weather, the lifeboat returned to the Lydia, salvaging personal possessions of the crew, before the Lydia was totally wrecked.

A new 34-foot 10-oared lifeboat arrived in Brancaster in November 1892. At a ceremony on 11 January 1893, the boat was named Alfred S. Genth (ON 332), after another donor's late husband. This was not without controversy. Soon afterwards, Mr Samuel Bird indicated his disappointment in the naming, and that he had been promised in writing by the Brancaster Honorary Secretary, that a replacement boat would also be named Lily Bird. To resolve this issue, the new Dunwich lifeboat was named Lily Bird (ON 370), serving from 1894 to 1903.

When burning flares were spotted at 10:20pm on 16 October 1896, the Alfred S. Genth was launched. The flares soon disappeared, and the vessel couldn't be found in the dark. Instead of returning home, the lifeboat set anchor, and waited until daylight, which revealed the wreck of the trawler Silver King on Middle Sand Bank. The crew had taken to a small boat, now drifting helplessly towards breaking seas. Six crew were rescued and landed at Hunstanton.

Disaster struck on 21 November 1909, when the carriage axle broke during a launch to the Brilliant of Goole, pitching the lifeboat sideways onto the sand. The lifeboat couldn't be launched, and three lives were lost off the Brilliant, the Wells-next-the-Sea lifeboat not arriving soon enough.

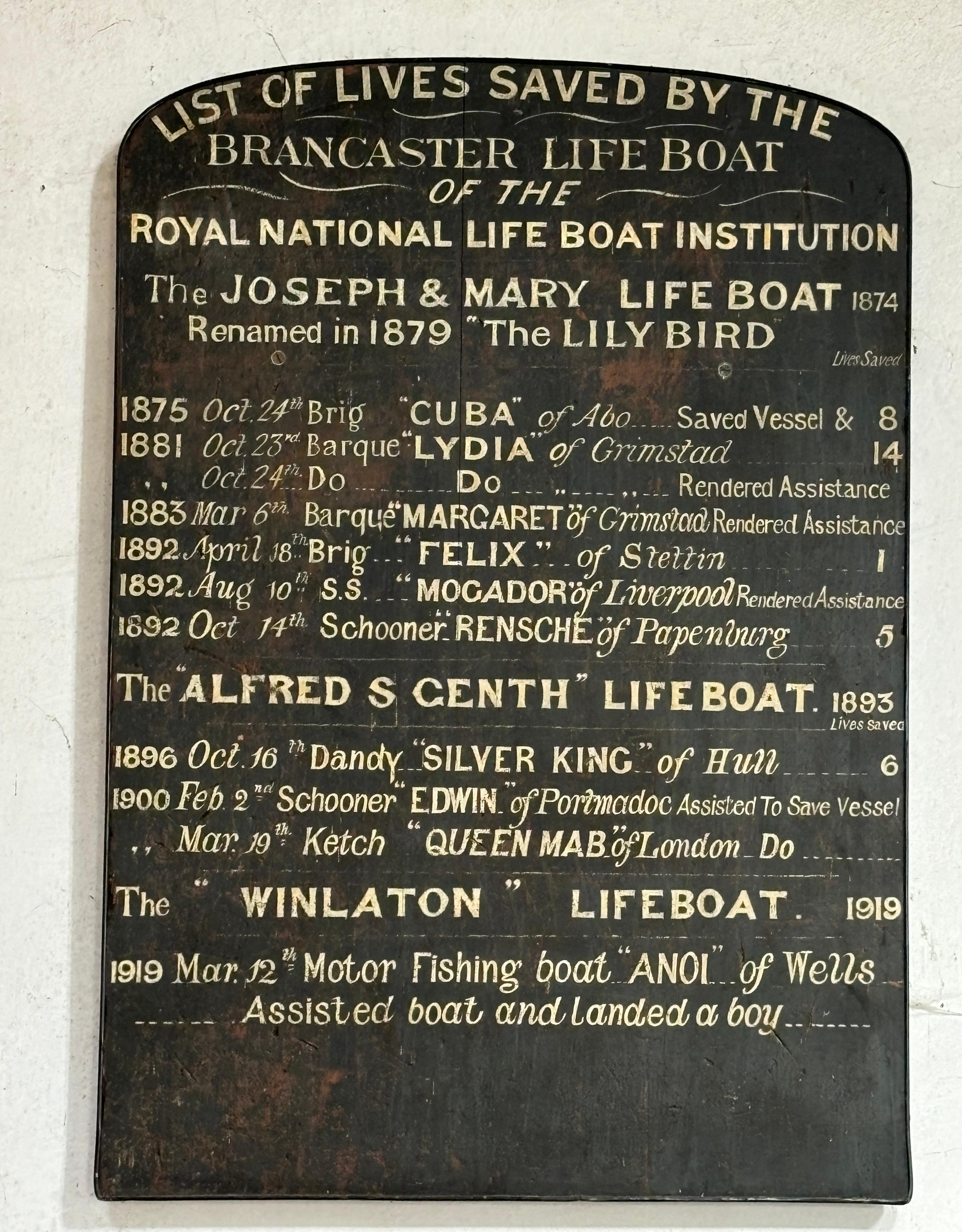
Brancaster Lifeboat Service Board at St Mary's Church, Brancaster

Brancaster would receive their third and final boat in May 1916, along with a new carriage from Bristol Wagon works. The boathouse was altered with wider doors, and lengthened, along with the construction of a storage annexe. There are no records of a naming ceremony, likely due to World War I, but the boat was named Winlaton (ON 666) at the bequest of Mr Thomas Thompson. In 1923, a Clayton launch tractor was supplied, but saw little use, as from 1916 to 1935, Winlaton would be launched just 5 times, with no lives saved.

With fewer wrecks, due to better sea navigation and engine powered vessels, less shipping traffic due to the railways, and increasing numbers of motor-powered lifeboats, especially at Skegness from 1932, the days of Brancaster lifeboat station were numbered. Brancaster Lifeboat Station was closed at the end of April 1935.

In 61 years, the Brancaster lifeboat had been launched 32 times, saving 34 lives and 5 vessels. Winlaton (ON 666) was sold locally, and was last reported as a yacht in 2005. No evidence remains of the boathouse. A storm in 1933 had destroyed the launchway, and undermined the boathouse, which was then demolished before the station closure. However, the station Service Board had been saved by lifeboat tractor driver Joe Powell. It was rediscovered by historian/author Michael Softley, and now hangs on display in the church of St Mary the Virgin in Brancaster.

== Brancaster lifeboats ==
=== Pulling and Sailing lifeboats ===
ON (Note: ON is the RNLI's Official Number of the boat.)	Name	Built	On station	Class	Comments
256	Joseph and Mary	1874	1874−1879	33-foot Peake Self-righting (P&S)	(Note: 33-foot x 8-foot 1in (10-oared) Peake-class self-righting (P&S) lifeboat, gift of Mrs A. Boetefeur of London, built by Woolfe of Shadwell, London, costing £316.); Renamed Lily Bird in 1879.
256	Lily Bird	1874	1879–1892	33-foot Peake Self-righting (P&S)	(Note: Gift of Mr S. Bird of Belsize Park)
332	Alfred S. Genth	1892	1892−1916	34-foot Self-righting (P&S)	(Note: 34-foot x 8-foot (10-oared) self-righting (P&S) lifeboat, gift of Mrs J. Silkenstadt of Didbury, built by R. McAlister of Dumbarton, costing £373.)
666	Winlaton	1916	1916−1935	35-foot Self-righting (P&S)	(Note: 35-foot x 8-foot 6in (10-oared) self-righting (P&S) lifeboat, legacy of Mr T. Thompson of Winlaton, built by S. E. Saunders of Cowes, costing £1000.)

Station closed, 1935

=== Launch and Recovery Tractors ===
Op. No. (Note: Op. No. is the RNLI's Operational Number of the boat or vehicle.)	Reg. No.	Type	On station	Comments
T10	AH 9213	Clayton	1923–1935	

== See also ==
- List of RNLI stations
- List of former RNLI stations
- Royal National Lifeboat Institution lifeboats
