= Bamburgh Castle Lifeboat Station =

Former lifeboat station in Northumberland, England

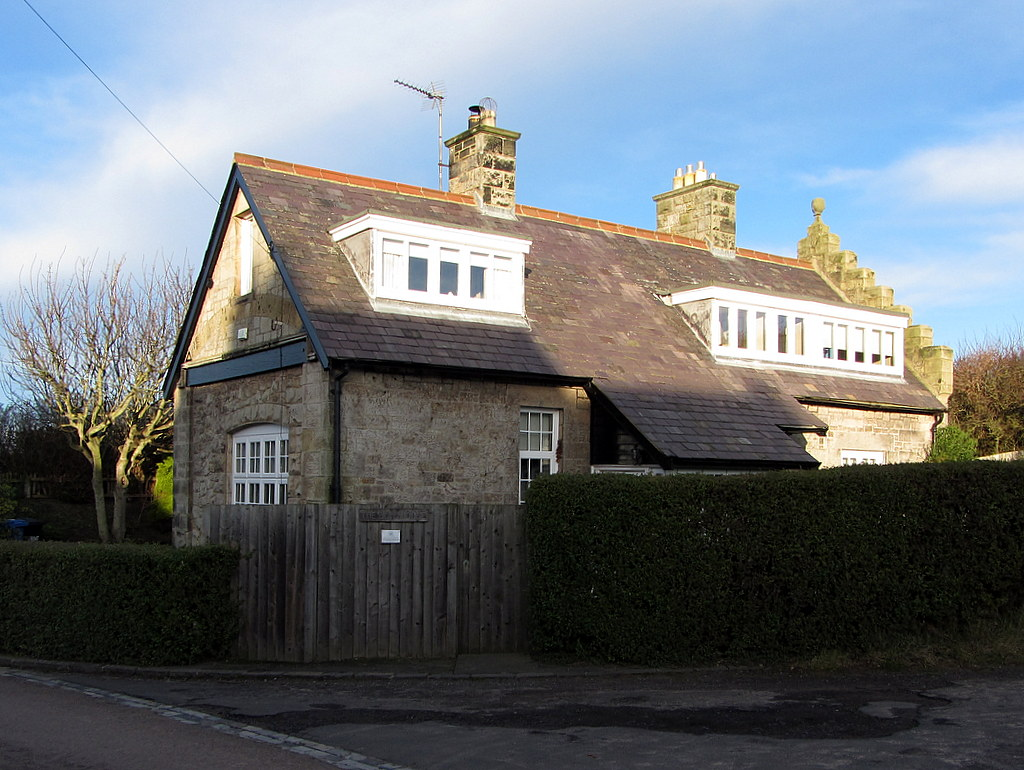
- Bamburgh Castle Lifeboat House.

- Bamburgh, Northumberland

General information
- Status: Closed
- Type: RNLI Lifeboat Station
- Location: The Boat House, The Wynding, Bamburgh, Northumberland, England
- Coordinates: 55°36′40.2″N 1°43′00.5″W
- Opened: 1882
- Closed: 1897

Bamburgh Castle Lifeboat Station was located on The Wynding in Bamburgh, a village noted as the site of Bamburgh Castle, and also the burial place of Grace Darling, situated approximately 18 miles (29 km) south-east of Berwick-upon-Tweed, in the county of Northumberland.

A lifeboat was first placed at Bamburgh Castle by Lionel Lukin in 1786, and managed by the Crewe Trustees until 1824. A lifeboat station operated by the Royal National Lifeboat Institution (RNLI) was established in 1882.

After operating for just 15 years, Bamburgh Castle Lifeboat Station closed in 1897.

== History ==
A local coble was modified to act as a lifeboat for Bamburgh Castle by Lionel Lukin in 1786. This was done at the request of a Dr Sharp and supported by the "Crewe Trustees", a charitable organisation founded by Nathaniel Crewe, Bishop of Durham in 1704. Because of this, it was long thought that Bamburgh Castle was the first lifeboat station in the country but more recent research puts that distinction with Formby Lifeboat Station, founded 10 years earlier.

Following several shipwrecks in the area, requests were made to the RNLI, to place a lifeboat at Bamburgh. Following a visit and report by the RNLI Inspector of Lifeboats, at a meeting of the RNLI committee of management on Thursday 3 November 1881, the placement of a lifeboat was agreed.

A site for a boathouse was chosen on The Wynding, and constructed at a cost of £231. A 32-foot self-righting 'Pulling and Sailing' (P&S) lifeboat, (one with oars and sails), built by Woolfe of Shadwell, and costing £282, was funded by the late Mr John Cuttell, of Holmfirth, Yorkshire. At a ceremony on 24 August 1882, the lifeboat was named John and Betty Cuttell (ON 184), after the late donor and his sister. A further £1000 was donated by Miss Cuttell for the upkeep of the Bamburgh Castle lifeboat in perpetuity.

In 1885, the John and Betty Cuttell (ON 184) was transferred to Upgang lifeboat station near Whitby, and renamed Joseph Sykes. Bamburgh Castle received another 32-foot self-righting lifeboat, built by Woolfe, again taking the name John and Betty Cuttell. The lifeboat was a slightly older boat, built in 1879, and previously named City of Manchester at Ferryside Lifeboat Station.

This lifeboat was called out just twice over the next 4 years, with both calls in March 1888. The first call on 4 March 1888, was to the vessel Marshall of Thurso, but the crew were ultimately rescued by the Boulmer lifeboat.

Just 11 days later, on 15 March 1888, the Albion of Brevig was wrecked, with the loss of seven of the 10 crew. Three men reached shore by themselves. Although the lifeboat was called, it didn't launch, and an inquiry was held.

The inquiry, held by the RNLI's district inspector at the Victoria Hotel in Bamburgh. The crew were acquitted of wasting inordinate time before launching, and then for failing to launch the lifeboat. In defence, it was said that it was extremely difficult to launch from the Bamburgh location, with both men and the wheeled lifeboat carriage getting stuck in the flat sand. Also it was noted that the station had difficulties recruiting crew. With local men tending to relocate frequently for work, the crew were primarily situated in North Sunderland, and were conveyed to Bamburgh upon the alarm being raised.

A third and final lifeboat would be provided to Bamburgh in 1889. This time, it was a 34-foot self-righting lifeboat, again constructed by Woolfe, costing £426, and again named John and Betty Cuttell (ON 247). The boat was only launched once, along with the North Sunderland lifeboat Thomas Berwick (ON 2), on 4 April 1891, to the vessel Ornen, aground at Greehill Rocks. Both lifeboats were beaten by the conditions, and failed to reach the vessel. The following day, with calmer conditions, a rescue was carried out by the North Sunderland lifeboat.

The John and Betty Cuttell was called a further three times, but stood down each time before launch.

With a record of just three launches and no lives saved, over a 15 year period, and with difficult launching conditions, Bamburgh Castle Lifeboat Station closed in 1897.

The boathouse still remains, and is used as a Holiday Let. The lifeboat on station at the time of closure, John and Betty Cuttell (ON 247), was sold from service the same year. No further details are known.

In 2021, car mechanic Chris Mason set off on his own personal challenge to visit every lifeboat station in the UK and Ireland, raising money for the RNLI on the way. He started his trip at the former station at Bamburgh Castle.

== Bamburgh Castle lifeboats ==
=== Pulling and Sailing (P&S) lifeboats ===
ON (Note: ON is the RNLI's Official Number of the boat.)	Name	Built	On station	Class	Comments
184	John and Betty Cuttell	1882	1882−1885	32-foot Prowse Self-righting (P&S)	(Note: 32-foot x 7-foot 6in (10-oared) Prowse-class self-righting lifeboat, gift of Mr J. Cuttell of Holmfirth, built by Woolfe of Shadwell, London, costing £282.)
Pre-642	John and Betty Cuttell	1879	1885−1889	32-foot Prowse Self-righting (P&S)	(Note: 32-foot x 7-foot 6in (10-oared) Prowse-class self-righting lifeboat, gift of the late Mr J. Cuttell of Holmfirth, built by Woolfe of Shadwell, London, costing £282 when new.); Previously City of Manchester at Ferryside.
247	John and Betty Cuttell	1889	1889−1897	34-foot Self-righting (P&S)	(Note: 34-foot x 7-foot 6in (10-oared) self-righting lifeboat, gift of the late Mr J. Cuttell of Holmfirth, built by Woolfe of Shadwell, London, costing £426.)

Pre ON numbers are unofficial numbers used by the Lifeboat Enthusiast Society to reference early lifeboats not included on the official RNLI list.

== See also ==
- List of RNLI stations
- List of former RNLI stations
- Royal National Lifeboat Institution lifeboats
