= Burnham Area Rescue Boat =

Search and rescue service in Bridgwater Bay, Somerset, England

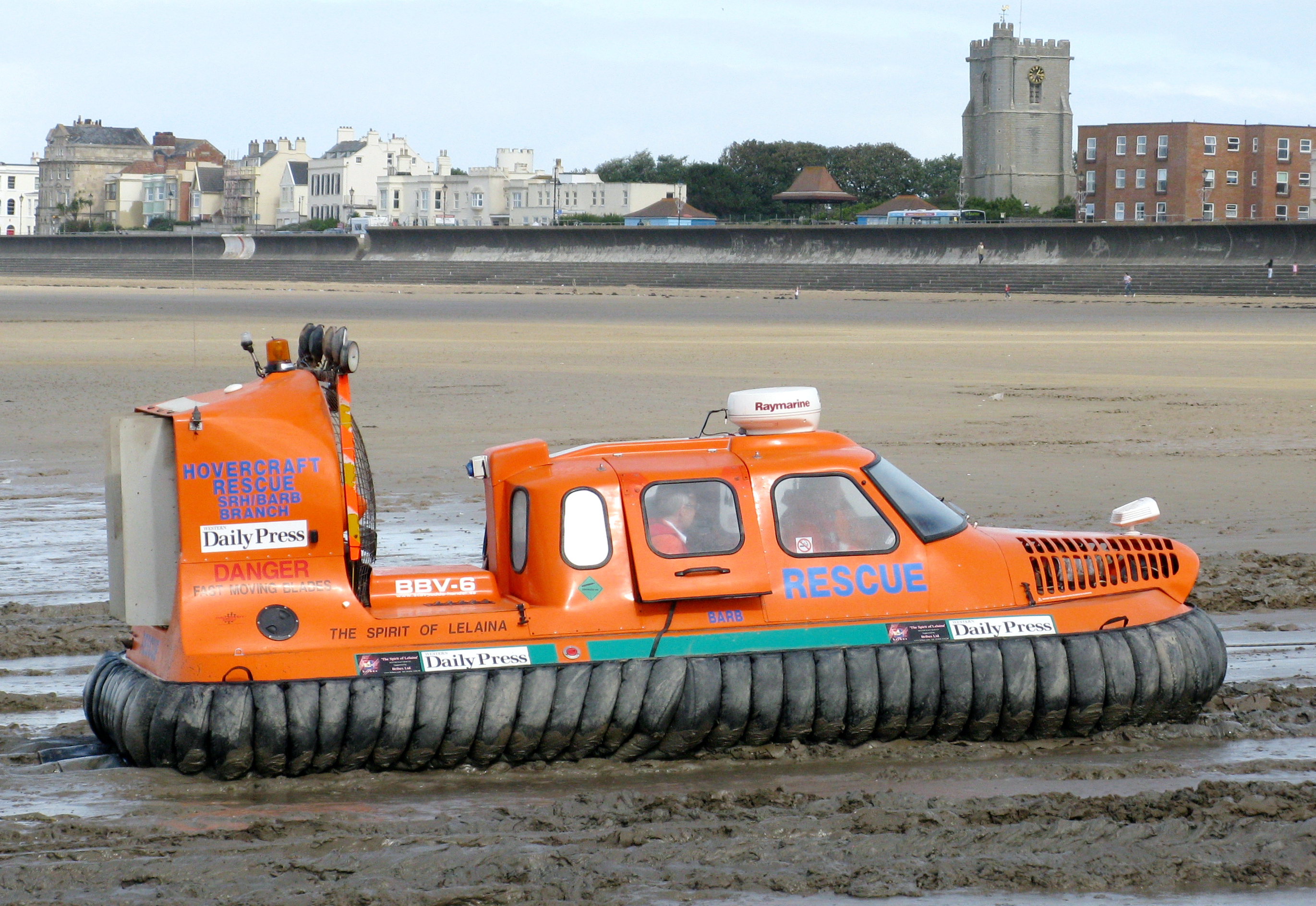
- Rescue hovercraft Spirit of Lelaina.

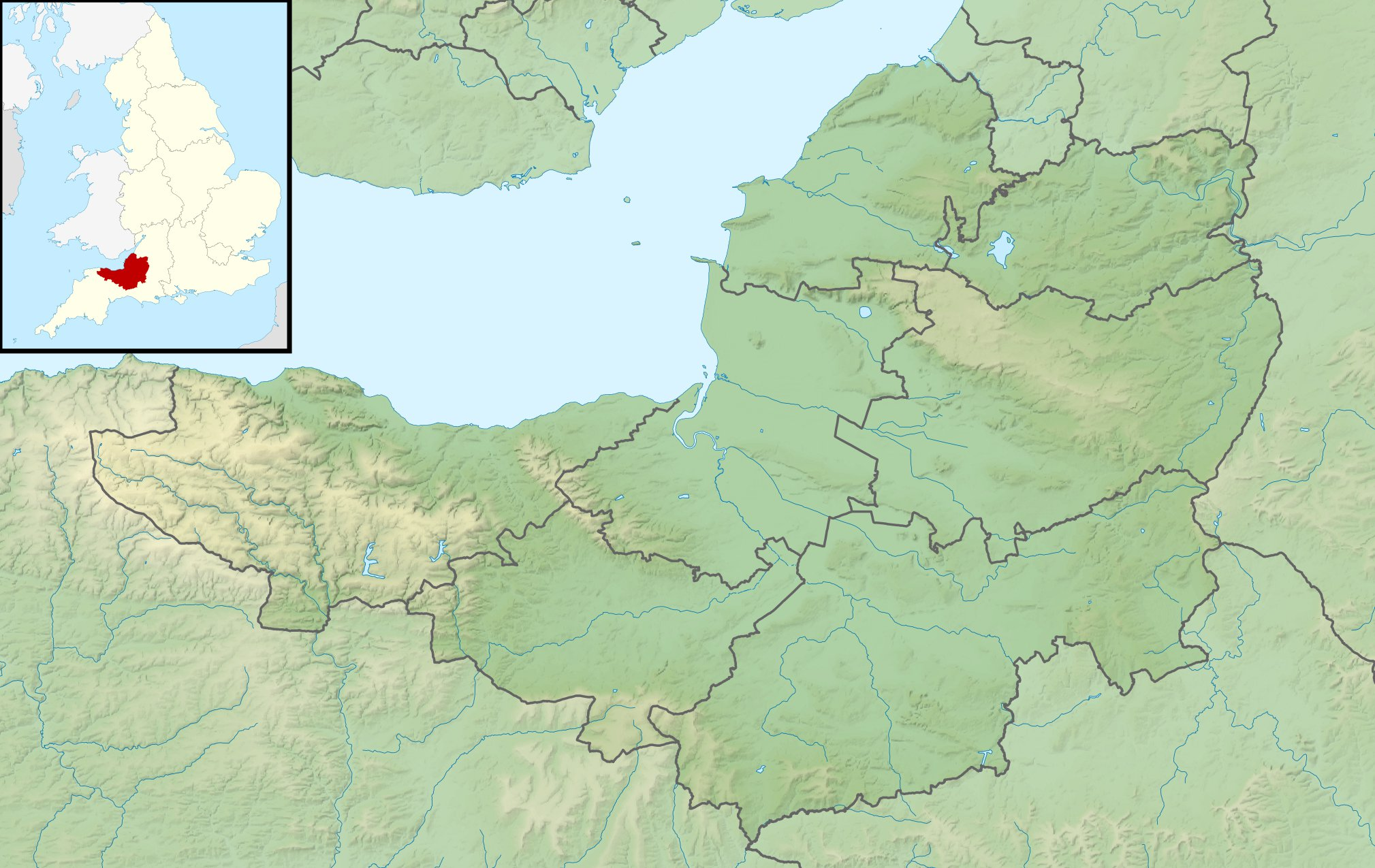
- Location within Somerset
- Alternative names: BARB Search & Rescue

General information
- Type: Marine Rescue Center
- Location: The Esplanade, TA8 1BB, United Kingdom
- Coordinates: 51.2331°N 2.9999°W
- Opened: 1994

Website
- barb.org.uk

Burnham Area Rescue Boat (BARB), also known as BARB Search & Rescue, is a voluntary independent search and rescue service, formed in 1992 in Burnham-on-Sea, Somerset that operates two rescue hovercraft and two inshore rescue boats in the Bridgwater Bay area. It is a registered charity.

It operates BBV hovercraft and small inshore rescue boats. The construction of its boathouse on the seafront in 1994 was the subject of a television programme and took just three days.

== History ==
Mud danger signs on Bridgwater Bay near the mouth of the River Parrett are necessary because fast, high-amplitude tides here have led to drownings on the extensive mud flats.

Burnham-on-Sea is on the shore of the Bristol Channel and has a long sandy beach, but nearby mudflats and sandbanks have claimed several lives over the years. At low tide, large parts of the area become mudflats up to 4 km (2.5 miles) wide due to the tidal range of 15 metres (49 ft), second only to the Bay of Fundy in Eastern Canada.

A lifeboat had been provided in the town from 1836, but this was withdrawn in 1930 leaving coverage for the area to the Weston-super-Mare lifeboat.

A charity appeal was established in 1992, by members of the local sailing community, to equip the town with its own inshore rescue boat. In June 1994, the boathouse was built in the space of three days by Anneka Rice and a team of builders for the BBC TV series Challenge Anneka. The site and technical support was provided by Sedgemoor District Council.

In June 2002, a five-year-old holidaymaker, Lelaina Hall, drowned on the mudflats at Berrow, north of the town. An appeal was launched in association with the Association of Search and Rescue Hovercraft (since renamed Hovercraft Search and Rescue UK) and with the backing of the Western Daily Press. This raised £115,000 to buy a rescue hovercraft, which could operate on mud and in shallow water that was unapproachable for the inshore rescue boat. It arrived on 22 March 2003, and during its first year of operation, up to 50 people were rescued.

BARB asked the Royal National Lifeboat Institution (RNLI) to take over inshore rescue boat work on the coast, which it did on 23 December 2003. The RNLI operates a B-class (Atlantic 75) Rigid Inflatable Boat (RIB) and a D-class (IB1) inflatable boat from Burnham-on-Sea Lifeboat Station, which is a short distance from the BARB boathouse and complements their hovercraft.

== Boathouse ==
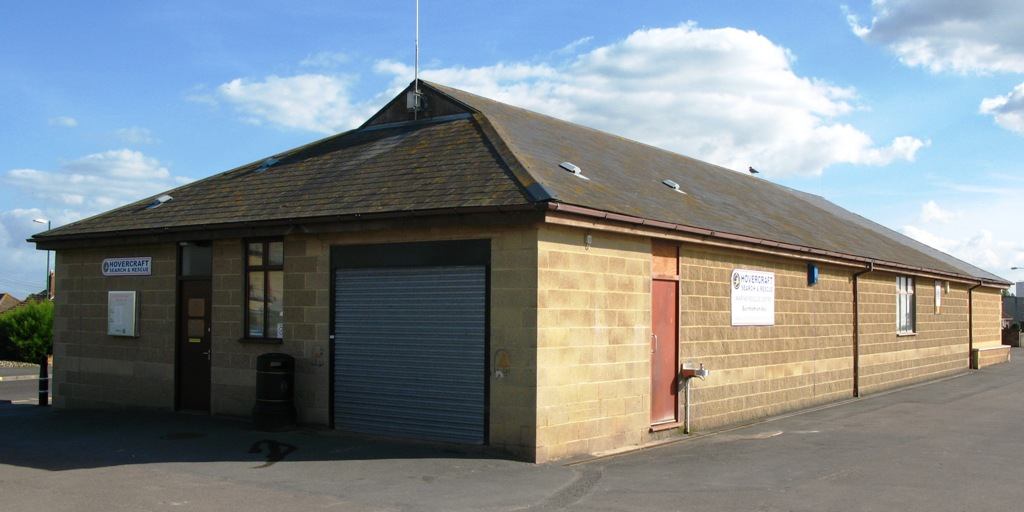
The BARB boathouse

BARB headquarters, The Marine Rescue Centre, is a single-storey block building that matches the adjacent tourist information centre and public conveniences. The boathouse is at the north end and the HM Coastguard have facilities at the other end of the building.

== Fleet ==
=== Inshore rescue boat ===
The two inshore rescue boats are Arancia inflatable boats, that can operate in calm inland waters to assist Police with searches for missing persons, usually alongside Avon and Somerset Fire and Rescue Service. They are also used to help wildlife charities such as Secret World in small wildlife rescues. Their main role is use by BARB Search & rescue's Swift Water Team as part of Surf Life Saving GB.

=== Spirit of Lelania ===
The Spirit of Lelania is a six-seat BBV-6 hovercraft designed by Bill Baker Vehicles and built by Ivanoff Hovercraft AB, in Sweden in 2003.

It is 5.25 metres (17 ft 3 in) long and 2.5 metres (8 ft 2 in) wide. Initially powered by a 110 hp (82 kW) engine, it has a cruising speed of 20 knots (37 km/h; 23 mph) over water.

In November 2010, the engine was replaced with a new 135 hp (101 kW) unit from a MG TF sports car, donated by the manufacturer MG Motor.

=== Light of Elizabeth ===
The Light Of Elizabeth is a four-seat BBV craft intended for training and reaching sites on the River Parrett where the larger hovercraft cannot operate. It entered service in August 2006.

A new larger Italian-designed hovercraft replaced Light Of Elizabeth in 2013. It was funded by donations from local individuals and groups, and built using kevlar rather than fibreglass to make it more resilient.

== See also ==
- Independent lifeboats in Britain and Ireland
