= Nairn Lifeboat Station =

Former RNLI lifeboat station in Highland, Scotland

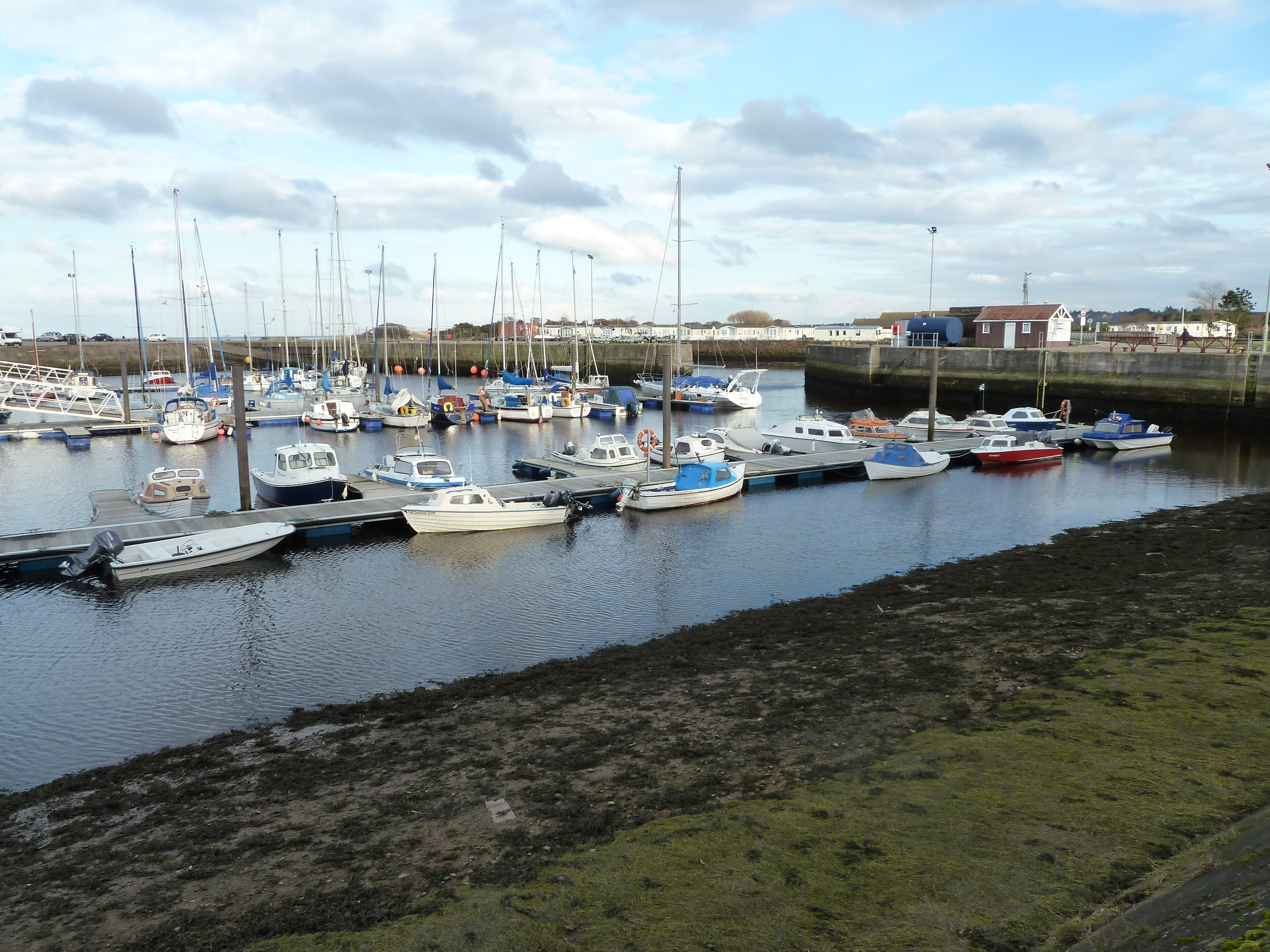
- Former site of the Nairn Lifeboat Station

- Location within Highland

General information
- Status: Closed
- Location: Nairn, Highland, IV12 4PH, Scotland
- Coordinates: 57°35′24.5″N 3°51′42.0″W
- Opened: 9 March 1878
- Closed: 1911

Nairn Lifeboat Station was located next to the River Nairn wharf in Nairn, a town and former royal burgh on the southern shore of the Moray Firth, approximately 15 miles (24 km) north-east of Inverness, in the administrative region of Highland, historically Nairnshire, on the east coast of Scotland.

A lifeboat was first placed at Nairn in 1878, by the Royal National Lifeboat Institution (RNLI).

After 33 years of operation, Nairn Lifeboat Station was closed in 1911, with service transferring to a new lifeboat station at Cromarty.

== History ==
On the application by local residents, and following the visits and report by Rear-Admiral John R. Ward, Inspector of Lifeboats, at a meeting of the RNLI committee of management on Thursday 5 June 1877, it was decided to establish four new lifeboat stations in Scotland, at Ackergill, Huna, Whitelink Bay, and at Nairn, "for the protection of the crews of vessels which may be wrecked or in distress on either side of the Moray Firth".

A 34-foot self righting 'Pulling and Sailing' (P&S) lifeboat, one with sails and (10) oars, was dispatched to the station, along with a transporting carriage. The cost of the lifeboat had been met from the legacy of the late C. T. Lloyd Williams of Cheltenham and Cardigan. At a ceremony on 9 March 1878, Capt. Sargeaunt, RN, Inspector of Lifeboats handed the lifeboat to the care of the local committee. Rev. Dr. Edwin Charles Wrenford then gave a blessing for the boat, after which it was named Caulfield and Ann (ON 267) by Lady Dunbar of Boath, in accordance with the wishes of the benefactor.

Just after 12:00 noon on 20 January 1881, the Nairn lifeboat was called to the aid of the schooner Annie Marie of Norway, on passage from Kragerø to Wick, Caithness, when she struck a reef off the Carse of Ardseer, and was then beached at Fort George. One man was rescued by a local coble. With great difficulty, the lifeboat was brought alongside the vessel, and the remaining three crew were rescued.

On 5 May 1881, the Institution recorded the receipt of a letter from the Swedish and Norwegian Minister at the Court of St. James, requesting that the thanks of his Government by passed to the Nairn lifeboat crew, for their "noble and humane" conduct.

The barque Himalaya of Tvedestrand, Norway, on passage from Sundsvall to Inverness with a cargo of timber, ran aground near Findhorn on 13 August 1885. Telegrams advising of the wreck were sent to Nairn. With the regular lifeboat crew all working away on fishing boats, Capt. Bain and Mr Crawford took charge of the lifeboat, and launched with a volunteer crew, into a northerly gale. After a hard pull through difficult seas, nine men were rescued from the Himalaya, shortly before the vessel became a complete wreck. Official thanks were accorded to Capt. Bain and Mr Crawford.

In 1892, along with Gourdon and Morte Bay, Nairn would receive one of three lifeboats funded from the legacy of the late Rev. Theophilus Sidney Echalaz of Surbiton, Surrey. In unique circumstances for the RNLI, which still causes confusion to this day, all three lifeboats were given the same name.

The report of the deputy chief inspector of life-boats was read and considered at a meeting of the RNLI committee of management on Thursday 11 August 1910. The detail is unavailable, but the decision was made to establish a new station at Cromarty, on the north side of the Moray Firth, and close the station at Nairn, which was completed in 1911.

The lifeboat on station at the time of closure, Theophilus Sidney Echelaz (ON 337), was sold from service in 1911. No further information is known. It is thought the lifeboat house was demolished to make way for the harbour extension work, sometime around 1930.

== Station honours ==
The following are awards made at Nairn.

- The Thanks of the Institution inscribed on Vellum

Capt. Bain – 1885
Mr Crawford – 1885

== Nairn lifeboats ==
ON (Note: ON is the RNLI's Official Number of the boat.)	Name	Built	On station	Class	Comments
267	Caulfield and Ann	1877	1878–1892	34-foot Self-righting (P&S)	(Note: 34-foot x 8-foot 3in (10-oared) self-righting (P&S) lifeboat, legacy of Mr C. J. lloyd-Williams of Cheltenham, built by Woolfe of Shadwell, London, costing £363.)
337	Theophilus Sidney Echelaz	1892	1892–1911	34-foot Self-righting (P&S)	(Note: 34-foot x 8-foot (10-oared) self-righting (P&S) lifeboat, legacy of Rev. T. S. Echalez of Surbiton, built by Forrestt of Limehouse, London, costing £446.)

Station Closed in 1911

== See also ==
- List of RNLI stations
- List of former RNLI stations
- Royal National Lifeboat Institution lifeboats
