= Watchet Lifeboat Station =

Former RNLI lifeboat station in Somerset, England

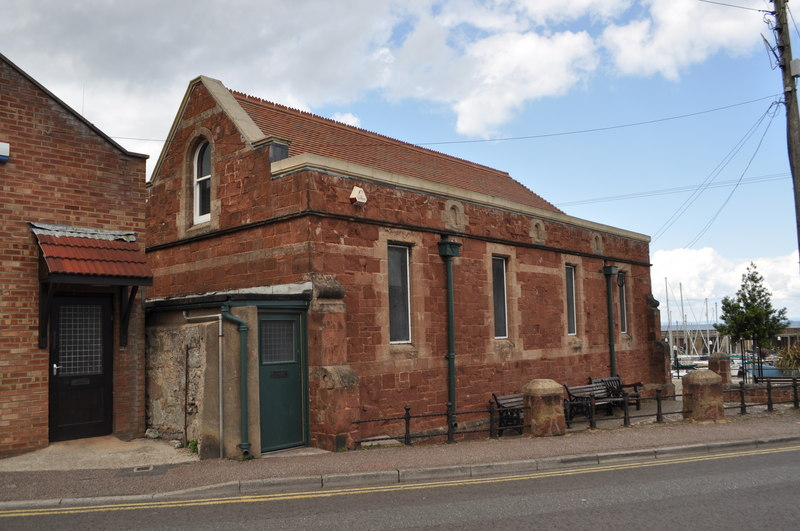
- Watchet former RNLI lifeboat station

- Watchet, Somerset

General information
- Status: Closed
- Type: RNLI lifeboat station
- Location: 11 The Esplanade, Watchet, Somerset, TA23 0AJ, England
- Coordinates: 51°10′54.4″N 3°19′42.1″W
- Opened: 1875
- Closed: 1944
- Owner: Watchet Town Council

Watchet Lifeboat Station was located at the eastern end of The Esplanade at Watchet, a harbour town on the edge of Exmoor National Park approximately 8 miles (13 km) east of Minehead, which sits at the mouth of the Washford River, overlooking Bridgwater Bay and the Bristol Channel, on the Somerset coast.

A lifeboat station was first established at Watchet in 1875 by the Royal National Lifeboat Institution (RNLI).

After 69 years of operation, Watchet Lifeboat Station closed in 1944. The building is in use as a public library.

== History ==
At a meeting of the RNLI committee of management on Thursday 2 July 1874, following the report from the Inspector of Lifeboats, it was decided to establish a lifeboat station at Watchet in Somerset. "..the shipping trade of which is increasing every year, while wrecks are occasionally taking place in the neighbourhood, and there is a long distance between the Lynmouth and Burnham lifeboat stations on either side of Watchet".

A sum of £1000 was appropriated to the new station, donated to the RNLI by Mrs. Maria Somes of Monkleigh, Devon, in memory of her late husband and former MP for Dartmouth (UK Parliament constituency), Joseph Somes.

A site for a boathouse was granted by Jane Wyndham, dowager Countess of Egremont of Orchard Wyndham, and constructed at the cost of £352. A 33-foot self-righting 'Pulling and Sailing' (P&S) Lifeboat, one with both sails and (10) oars, along with its launching carriage, were transported free of charge from Bristol to Williton, by the Bristol and Exeter railway company.

In a grand parade on 29 July 1875, including members of the Foresters, the Odd Fellows and the band of the North Somerset Rifle Corps, the lifeboat was brought from Williton via Orchard Wyndham into Watchet, the town bedecked in flags and flowers for the occasion. At the slipway in Watchet, a short service was carried out by Rev. W. J. Noble, after which the lifeboat was formally named Joseph Somes, and then launched for a demonstration to the assembled crowd.

On the 29 March 1878, the Joseph Somes was launched into a strong gale, to the sloop Olive Branch of Cardiff, which had dragged her anchors, and stranded at Warren Shore, approximately 1 mile (1.6 km) to the west of Watchet. The three crew were safely brought ashore.

In 1883, a sum of £230-17s-7d was contributed to the Institution by the readers of The Union Jack magazine, via its editor, Mr. G. A. Henty. The monies were appropriated to Watchet lifeboat station, and in 1884, the lifeboat name was changed to W. H. G KIngston. Two subsequent lifeboats took the same name.

Joseph Somes / W. H. G. Kingston was the first of six lifeboats to be placed at Watchet, but it would appear service records are few and far between. Maybe the number of calls is reflected in the age of lifeboats placed on service. In 1919, John Lingard Ross (ON 510) was replaced by a lifeboat already 19-years-old, and two-years older. Sarah Pilkington (ON 473) would remain on service at Watchet for a further 25 years.

A proposal had been made in 1900 to close the station at Watchet and replace it with one at Minehead. The residents of Watchet put forward a strong argument to retain their lifeboat. They reasoned that Watchet was a busier harbour with a larger number of seafarers who could volunteer to crew the lifeboat. They also pointed out that, while they had been launched to assist vessels in many places along the coast, they had never been called to Minehead. Watchet was retained for the time being but Minehead Lifeboat Station was also opened in 1901. Watchet was closed 1944 as Minehead now had a motor lifeboat that could cover the area more effectively than Watchet's 'pulling and sailing' lifeboat. The lifeboat on station at the time of closure, Sarah Pilkington (ON 473), was sold from service in 1945. She was last reported in February 2024, as the yacht Manvana, on the River Great Ouse at Downham Market.

The building was gifted to the town in 1951 and opened as a library in May 1953. In 2019 the ownership was transferred from the county council to Watchet town council.

== Watchet lifeboats ==
=== Pulling and Sailing (P&S) lifeboats ===
On Station	ON (Note: ON is the RNLI's Official Number of the boat.)	Name	Built	Class	Comments
1875−1884	Pre-593	Joseph Somes	1875	33-foot Self-righting (P&S)	(Note: 33-foot x 8-foot 6in (10-oared) self-righting (P&S) lifeboat, costing £328-18s.); Renamed in 1884.
1884−1887	Pre-593	W. H. G. Kingston	1875	33-foot Self-righting (P&S)	Renamed in 1884.
1887−1900	152	W. H. G. Kingston	1887	34-foot Self-righting (P&S)	(Note: 34-foot x 8-foot (10-oared) self-righting (P&S) lifeboat.)
1900−1902	339	W. H. G. Kingston	1892	36-foot Self-righting (P&S)	(Note: 36-foot x 7-foot 6in (12-oared) self-righting (P&S) lifeboat.); Previously at Morte Bay
1902−1903	265	Quiver No.1	1883	37-foot 2in Self-righting (P&S)	(Note: 37-foot 2in x 9-foot (12-oared) self-righting (P&S) lifeboat.); Previously at Margate and Wicklow.
1903−1919	510	John Lingard Ross	1903	35-foot Self-righting (P&S)	(Note: 35-foot x 8-foot 9in (10-oared) self-righting (P&S) lifeboat.)
1919−1944	473	Sarah Pilkington	1901	35-foot Self-righting (P&S)	(Note: 35-foot x 8-foot 6in (10-oared) self-righting (P&S) lifeboat.); Previously at Stornoway. Sold in 1945 and last reported in 2024 as a yacht on the River Great Ouse.

Pre ON numbers are unofficial numbers used by the Lifeboat Enthusiast Society to reference early lifeboats not included on the official RNLI list.

== See also ==
- List of RNLI stations
- List of former RNLI stations
- Independent lifeboats in Britain and Ireland
