= Morthoe Lifeboat Station =

Former RNLI lifeboat station in Somerset, England

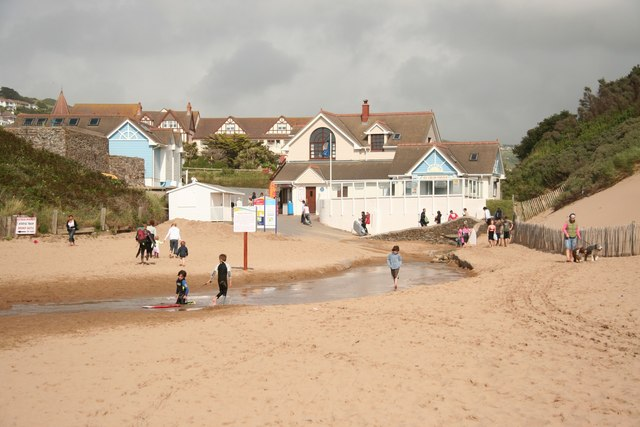
- Former Morthoe lifeboat station

- Location within Devon
- Former names: Morte Bay Lifeboat Station

General information
- Status: Closed
- Type: RNLI lifeboat station
- Location: Challascombe Hill Road, Woolacombe, Devon, EX34 7BW, England
- Coordinates: 51°10′14.0″N 4°12′29.0″W
- Opened: 17 March 1871
- Closed: 1900

Morthoe Lifeboat Station was located near the village of Morthoe, on the south side of Morte Point, a headland 5 mi (8.0 km) west of Ilfracombe, in the north-west corner of the county of Devon, England.

A lifeboat was first placed at Morthoe in 1871, by the Royal National Lifeboat Institution (RNLI). The station was initially named Morte Bay Lifeboat Station, although it was sited within what is now the village of Woolacombe.

After 29 years of operation, Morthoe Lifeboat Station closed in 1900.

== History ==
Morte Point is a peninsula in the north-west corner of Devon, and has been the site of many shipwrecks. Even today, wreckage from the late nineteenth and early twentieth century can still be found along the coast.

At 19:00 on 19 March 1869, the Italian barque Drago was reported in trouble off Morte Point. The Ilfracombe lifeboat Broadwater finally got away at the third attempt, launching at 10:30 the following day, followed by four hours hard rowing in rough seas to reach the casualty vessel. All 15 crew plus a pilot, were rescued, with the lifeboat towed back to Ilfracombe by steam tug.

With Morte Point being such a considerable rowing distance for the nearest lifeboat, the Ilfracombe branch of the RNLI requested that an additional lifeboat be stationed nearer the peninsula. With consideration to the report of the Inspector of Lifeboats following his visit, at a meeting of the RNLI committee of management on Thursday 7 July 1870, it was decided that Morte Bay Lifeboat Station be established on the north coast of Devon, "where it was considered that such a boat would occasionally be of service". It was decided that the gift of a lifeboat, and £50 per annum towards its upkeep, offered by the Bristol Ship-masters in the African trade, would be appropriated to the station.

Sir Bruce Chichester, Bt. promised his assistance in the management of the station, and also provided the site for a boathouse, which was constructed at a cost of £185-10s. The site of the boathouse is now absorbed in the present day village of Woolacombe, but at the time, Woolacombe was just a few farm dwellings. Even the nearest village of Morthoe, now known as Mortehoe, could not provide sufficient crew. It was agreed that the lifeboat crew from Ilfracombe would be transported the 6 miles (9.7 km) by road, should the lifeboat be required, arriving in a far faster time than by rowing. Extra men were enrolled at Ilfracombe should both boats be required, and former Ilfracombe coxswain George Williams was appointed caretaker of the new boathouse.

A 33-foot (10 m) Peake-class 'Pulling and Sailing' (P&S) lifeboat, one with sails and (10) oars was constructed by Woolfe of Shadwell, London, at a cost of £285. Prior to its arrival in Devon, the lifeboat, with its carriage, was first conveyed by rail to Bristol. On 11 March 1871, the lifeboat, with a crew of Naval Reserve men in cork lifejackets, was drawn by a team of eight horses, through the streets of the city in grand procession, accompanied by over 1000 Volunteer Riflemen, Artillery, and Engineers, along with Shipmasters, Coastguard, and at least five bands of musicians. It is estimated a crowd of 60,000 people lined the streets. The lifeboat was taken to the Clifton Zoological Gardens, where it was handed to the care of the Institution. The lifeboat was named Jack-a-Jack (ON 225), after which it was launched on demonstration in the ornamental lake, with a gun salute from the Volunteer Artillery.

The lifeboat was later towed by steamer to Ilfracombe, arriving on station on 17 March 1871, witnessed once again by a considerable crowd, despite the remote location.

The lifeboat had been funded by the society of ship-masters of the Port of Bristol, in the Africa trade, but despite the grand celebrations held in Bristol for the naming ceremony, it is reported that the society failed to maintain payments. At a meeting of the RNLI committee of management on Thursday 3 Oct 1872, it was announced that the bequest of the late Robert Atton of Taunton was to be appropriated to the Morte Bay lifeboat station. The lifeboat was duly renamed Grace Woodbury.

Grace Woodbury would serve for the next twenty years at Morte Bay, launching just twice. She was launched on 16 December 1874, to the aid of the Dublin brig Annie Arby, but the Ilfracombe lifeboat arrived first, and saved the crew of seven. On her return trip, the Ilfracombe lifeboat chanced upon a small boat, survivors from another wreck, and saved a further five men. Her only effective service took place on 6 March 1883, when seven men were rescued from the steamship Lynx, which had run ashore at Morte Point. The vessel was later refloated, and taken by lifeboat crew to Appledore.

In 1887, the station was renamed Morthoe Lifeboat Station.

A replacement lifeboat arrived on station in 1892. Morthoe, along with lifeboat stations at Nairn (ON 337) and Gourdon (ON 340), received one of three lifeboats, (ON 339), funded from the legacy of the late Rev. Theophilus Sidney Echalaz of Surbiton, Surrey. In unique circumstances for the RNLI, which can still cause confusion to this day, all three lifeboats were given the same name, Theophilus Sidney Echalaz.

In the next eight years, Theophilus Sidney Echalaz (ON 339) was never launched on service. It was also reported that launching into strong winds blowing onto its west-facing beach had always proven difficult. Following a visit by the Chief Inspector of Lifeboats, and with consideration to the lifeboat only being launched twice in 29 years, at the meeting of the RNLI committee of management on Thursday 10 May 1900, it was decided that Morthoe Lifeboat Station be discontinued.

The lifeboat on station at the time of closure, Theophilus Sidney Echalaz (ON 339), was transferred to Watchet. The boathouse, by then in the growing village of Woolacombe, still stands, and is in use as the Boat House Café.

== Morthoe lifeboats ==
=== Pulling and sailing lifeboats ===
ON (Note: ON is the RNLI's Official Number of the boat.)	Name	Built	On Station	Class	Comments
225	Jack-a-Jack	1871	1871–1872	33-foot Peake Self-righting (P&S)	(Note: 33 ft 0 in (10.06 m) x 8 ft 0 in (2.44 m) (10-oared) Peake-class self-righting (P&S) lifeboat, gift of the Bristol Shipmasters in Africa Trade, built by Woolfe of Shadwell, London, costing £285. Appropriated to the legacy of Robert Atton of Taunton in 1872, and renamed.); Renamed Grace Woodbury in 1872.
225	Grace Woodbury	1871	1872–1892	33-foot Peake Self-righting (P&S)	Renamed Grace Woodbury in 1872.
339	Theophilus Sidney Echalaz	1892	1892–1900	36-foot Self-righting (P&S)	(Note: 36 ft 0 in (10.97 m) x 8 ft 0 in (2.44 m) (10-oared) self-righting (P&S) lifeboat, legacy of Rev T. S. Echalaz of Surbiton, built by Forrest of Limehouse, London, costing £517.); Transferred to Watchet in 1900, where it was renamed W.H.G. Kingston.

== See also ==
- List of RNLI stations
- List of former RNLI stations
- Independent lifeboats in Britain and Ireland
