= Cromarty Lifeboat Station =

Former RNLI lifeboat station in Highland, Scotland

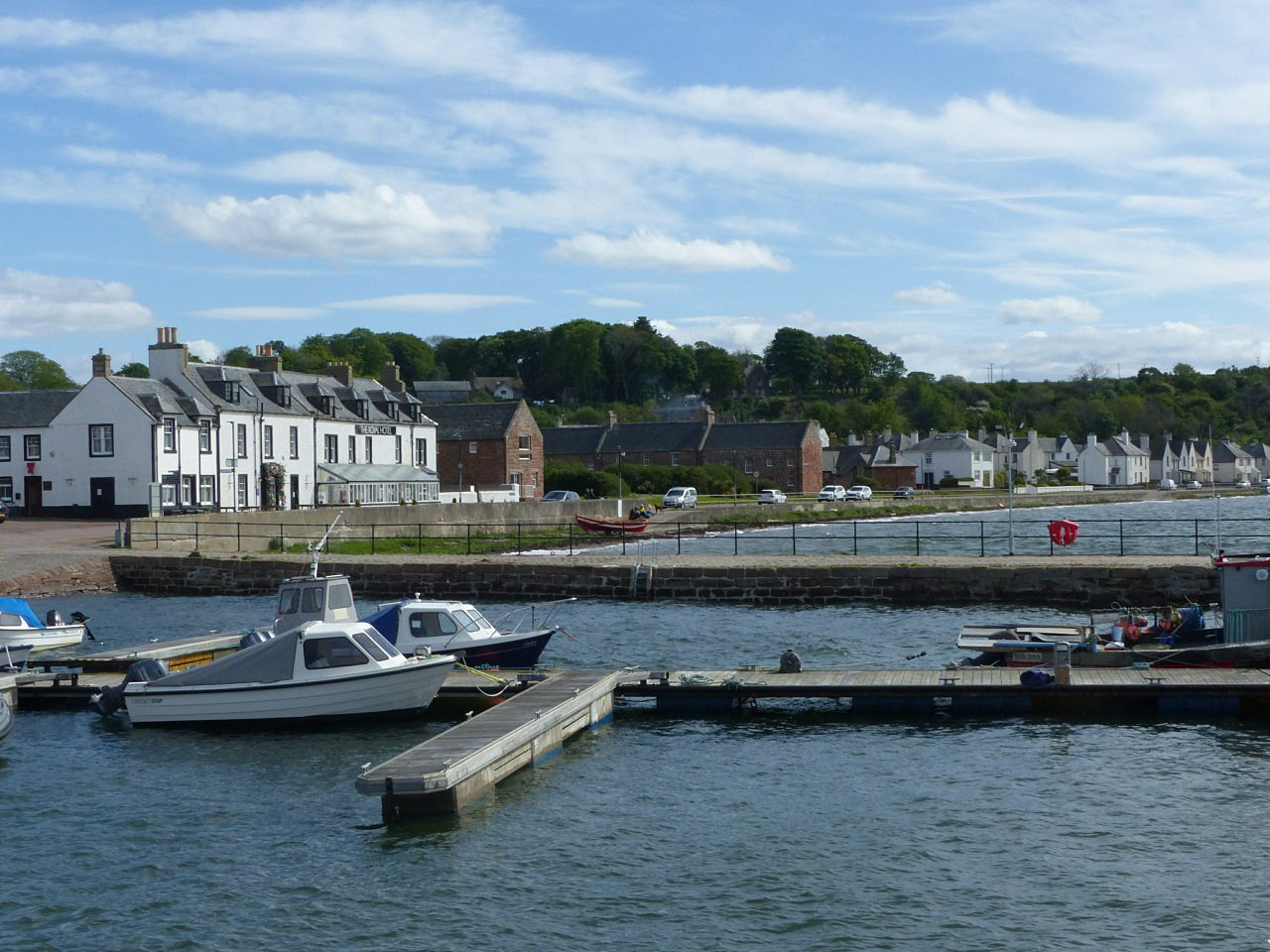
- Cromarty Harbour

- Cromarty, Highland

General information
- Status: Closed
- Location: Cromarty, Highland, Scotland
- Coordinates: 57°40′53.9″N 4°02′17.0″W
- Opened: 1911
- Closed: 1968

Cromarty Lifeboat Station was located on Marine Terrace in Cromarty, a town and former royal burgh on the Black Isle peninsula, overlooking the Cromarty Firth, approximately 20 miles (32 km) north-east of Inverness, in the administrative region of Highland, historically Ross and Cromarty, on the east coast of Scotland.

A lifeboat was first placed at Cromarty in 1911, by the Royal National Lifeboat Institution (RNLI).

After 57 years of operation, Cromarty Lifeboat Station was closed in 1968.

== History ==
Ever since its founding in 1824, the Royal National Institution for the Preservation of Life from Shipwreck (RNIPLS), later to become the RNLI in 1854, would award medals for deeds of gallantry at sea, even if no lifeboats were involved. On 18 October 1840, Lt. Charles Duncan Warren of H.M. Coastguard, Cromarty was awarded the RNIPLS Silver Medal, when he and his crew put off in the coastguard boat, and saved the Master and single crewman from the sloop Banff of Fortrose, when it was wrecked off Cromarty.

It would be 70 years later, when the report of the Deputy Chief Inspector of Life-boats was read and considered at a meeting of the RNLI committee of management on Thursday 11 August 1910, that the decision was made to establish a new lifeboat station at Cromarty, on the north side of the Moray Firth, and close the station at Nairn, on the south side of the Moray Firth, which was completed in 1911.

However, the 19-year-old lifeboat from Nairn, Theophilus Sidney Echelaz (ON 337), wasn't transferred to Cromarty in 1911, instead being sold from service that same year. Instead, another 19-year-old 'Pulling and Sailing' (P&S) lifeboat, one with oars and sails, Brothers (ON 315), previously at St Annes, was placed at Cromarty, and served there for a further 12 years.

In 1923, another 22-year-old P&S lifeboat John Wesley (ON 456) was placed at Cromarty, serving for five years. During their time on station, the first two boats had been launched just eight times, and saved two lives.

The station would finally receive a new lifeboat in 1928, which was built at a cost of £8,500 by J. Samuel White of Cowes. The 45-foot 6in Watson-class lifeboat had twin 40-hp petrol engines, delivering 8.25 knots. At that time, it was also one of a handful of unnamed lifeboats, hoping to be assigned a generous benefactor. That benefactor would come to be the late Dr James Macfee of Auchterarder, who died on 8 October 1930. Cromarty would finally get to have a lifeboat naming ceremony, which took place on 26 Aug 1931, three years after their third lifeboat arrived on station. After a service of dedication by Rev. George Burnett, the lifeboat was named James Macfee (ON 711) by Miss J. Macfee, niece of the late donor. Music for the ceremony was provided by the Pipe Band of the Seaforth Highlanders, with a guard of honour provided by the local Girl Guides and Brownies.

On the afternoon of 7 December 1959, in gale-force conditions, the coaster Servus of Leith, on passage from Methil to Kirkwall, broke her propeller shaft, and was drifting, over 9 miles (14 km) south-east of Clythness Lighthouse, and approximately 40 miles (64 km) from Cromarty. The 46-foot 9in Watson-class lifeboat Lilla Marras, Douglas and Will (ON 928), on station at Cromarty since 1955, was launched at 16:45, arriving with the vessel at 01:30. With seas of up to 20 feet (6.1 m) high, and both vessels pitching up and down, the lifeboat was brought alongside, sustaining some damage, but managing to get five of the crew aboard. A second run retrieved the three remaining crew. Heading home at 02:00, the lifeboat made Cromarty at 07:47. Coxswain Albert Watson and Mechanic John Watson were each awarded the RNLI Silver Medal.

Following a review by the working party of the RNLI committee of management, "with a view to ensure the most efficient deployment of the rescue craft of the Institution", the life-boat was withdrawn, and Cromarty Lifeboat Station was closed in 1968.

During the 57 years of operation, Cromarty lifeboat had been launched 85 times, and saved 32 lives. The station building no longer exists. The lifeboat on station at the time of closure, Lilla Marras, Douglas and Will (ON 928), went on to serve at Falmouth, and then Donaghadee, until she was sold from service in 1982. Last recorded in 2023, she was in use as holiday accommodation in Harlingen, Netherlands.

== Station honours ==
The following are awards made at Cromarty.

- RNIPLS Silver Medal

Lt. Charles Duncan Warren, RN, H.M. Coastguard Cromarty – 1840

- RNLI Silver Medal

Albert Watson, Coxswain – 1960
John Watson, Mechanic – 1960

- The Thanks of the Institution inscribed on Vellum

George Morrison, Assistant Mechanic – 1960

- Medal Service Certificate

Edward Scott, Second Coxswain – 1960
J. W. Bathie, Bowman – 1960
J. Hepburn, crew member – 1960
J. Smith, crew member – 1960
J. Hogg, crew member – 1960

== Cromarty lifeboats ==
=== Pulling and Sailing (P&S) lifeboats ===
ON (Note: ON is the RNLI's Official Number of the boat.)	Name	Built	On station	Class	Comments
315	Brothers	1892	1911–1923	43-foot Watson (P&S)	(Note: 43-foot x 11-foot 9in (12-oared) Watson-class non-self-righting (P&S) lifeboat, an anonymous gift, built by D. and W. Henderson and Company of Partick, costing £1,565 when new.); Previously at St Annes.
456	John Wesley	1901	1923–1928	43-foot Watson (P&S)	(Note: 43-foot x 12-foot 6in (10-oared) Watson-class non-self-righting (P&S) lifeboat, gift of the John Wesley LB Fund, via Rev. Hargreaves and John Cory, built by Thames Ironworks of Blackwall, London, costing £1,712 when new.); Previously at Barry Dock.

=== Motor lifeboats ===
ON	Name	Built	On station	Class	Comments
711	Unnamed	1928	1928–1931	45-foot 6in Watson	(Note: 45-foot 6in x 12-foot 6in Watson-class lifeboat, built by J. Samuel White of Cowes, with twin 40-hp petrol engines, delivering 8.25 knots, and costing £8,500)
711	James Macfee	1928	1931–1955	45-foot 6in Watson	(Note: Legacy of Dr James Macfee of Auchterarder.)
928	Lilla Marras, Douglas and Will	1955	1955–1968	46-foot 9in Watson	

Station Closed in 1968

== See also ==
- List of RNLI stations
- List of former RNLI stations
- Royal National Lifeboat Institution lifeboats
