= Burnham-on-Sea Lifeboat Station =

RNLI Lifeboat station in Somerset, UK

- Flag of the RNLI

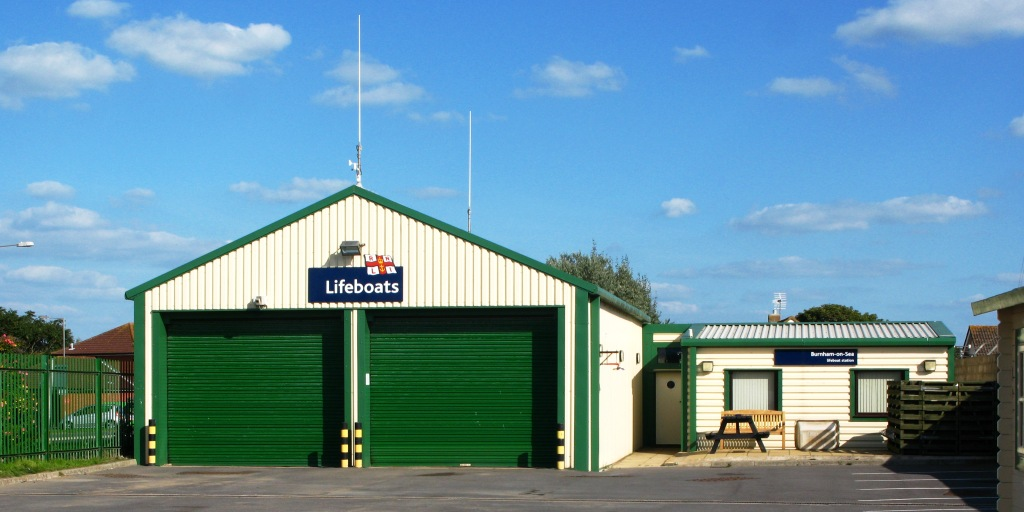
- Burnham-on-Sea Lifeboat Station

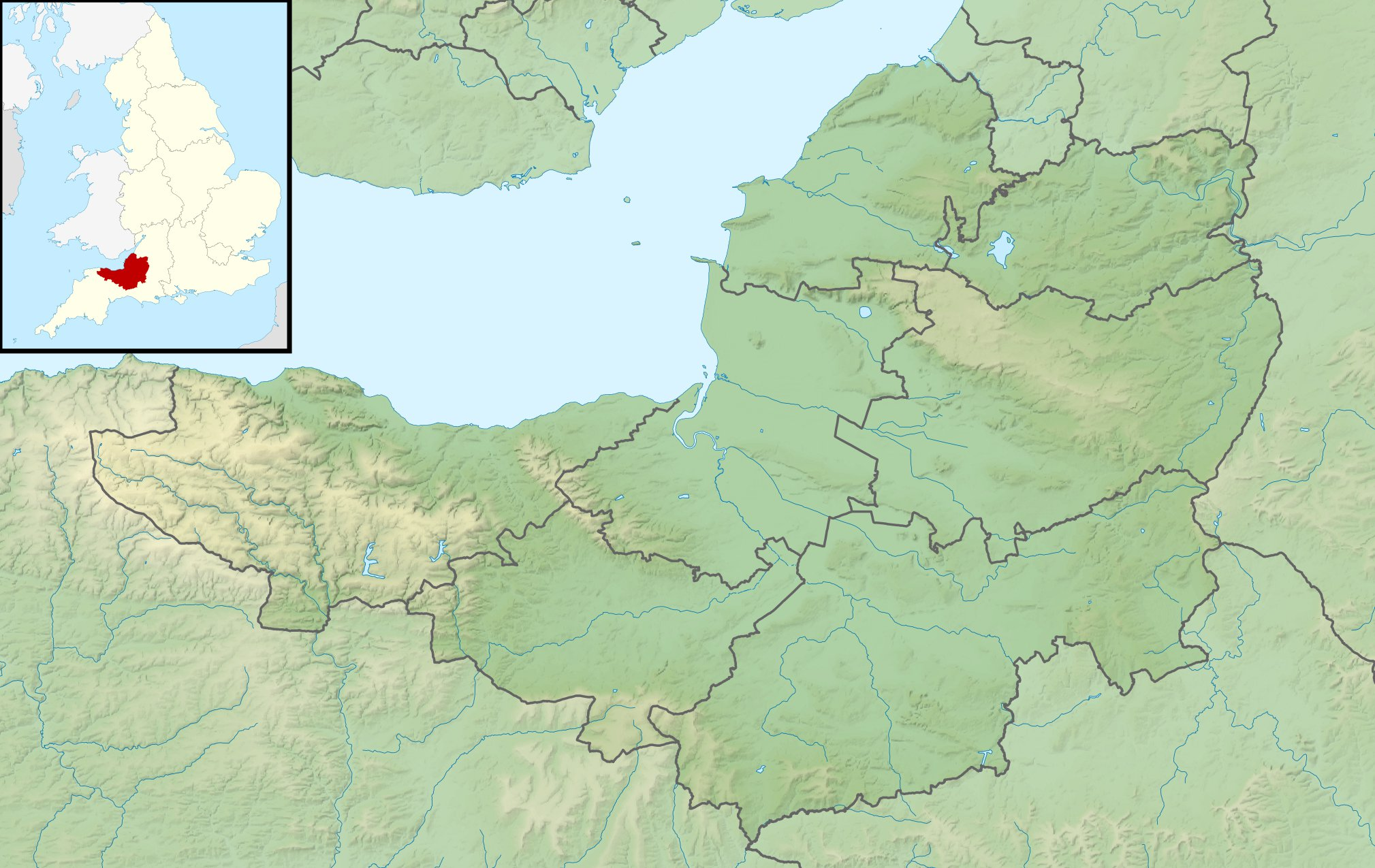
- Location within Somerset

General information
- Type: Lifeboat station
- Location: Pier Street,, Burnham-on-Sea, Somerset, United Kingdom
- Coordinates: 51.2337°N 2.9973°W
- Opened: First station 1836; Present station 2003
- Owner: Royal National Lifeboat Institution

Website
- Burnham-on Sea RNLI Lifeboat Station

Burnham-on-Sea Lifeboat Station is located on Pier street in Burnham-on-Sea, a seaside town at the mouth of the River Parrett, overlooking Bridgwater Bay and the Bristol Channel. The town sits 10 miles (16 km) to the south of Weston-super-Mare, in the county of Somerset in England.

A lifeboat was first placed at Burnham-on-Sea in 1836, operated by the Bridgwater Harbour Trust. The station was re-established by the Royal National Lifeboat Institution (RNLI) in 1866, operating until its closure in 1930.

Burnham Area Rescue Boat (BARB), an independent rescue service, was established in 1993, but in 2003, decided to concentrate on operating a rescue hovercraft. The RNLI were invited to take over the Inshore lifeboat operations, re-establishing a station at Burnham-on-Sea in 2003.

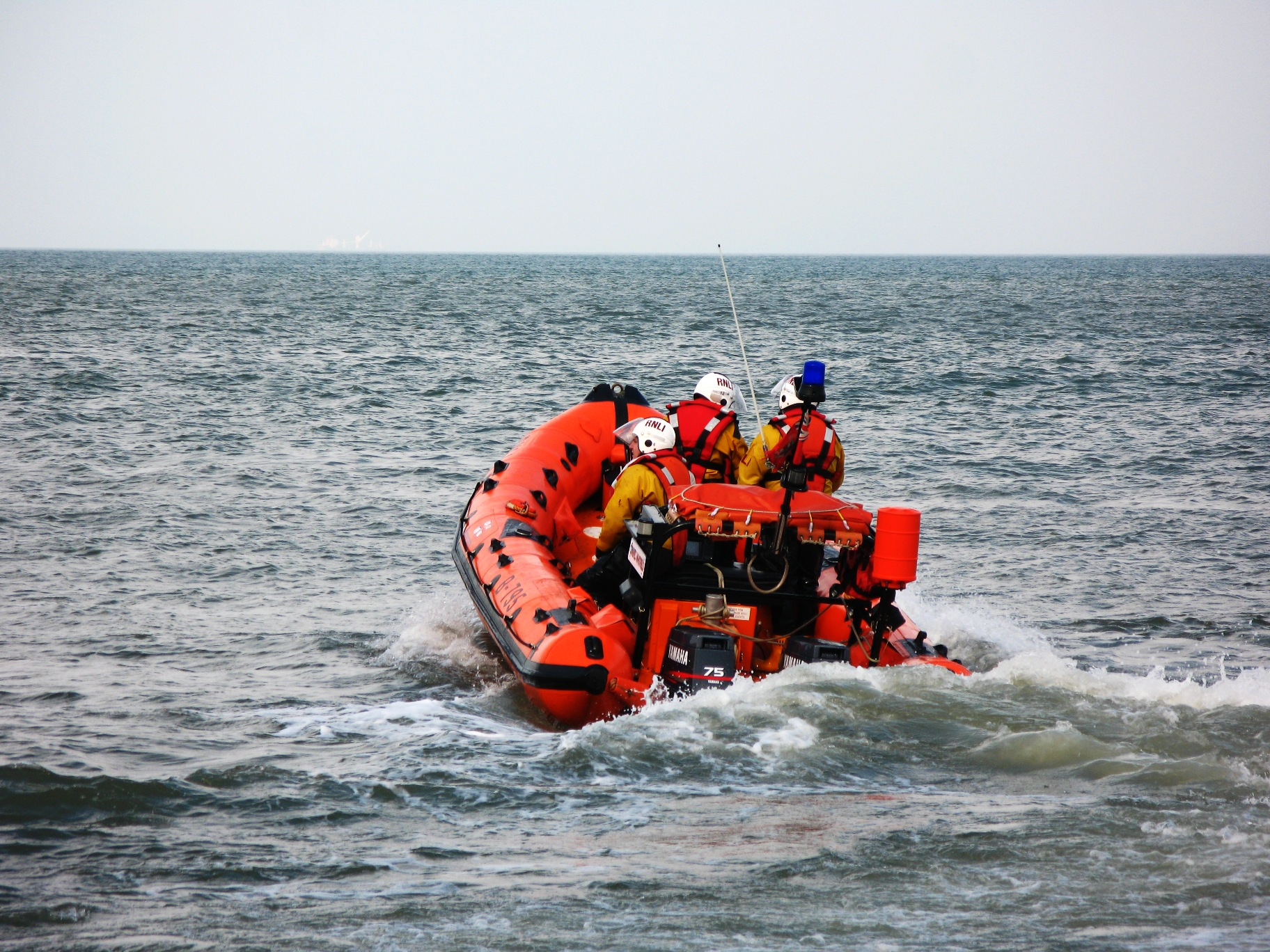
B-class (Atlantic 75) Staines Whitfield (B-795) (2004–2018) launching in 2010

The RNLI station currently operates two Inshore lifeboats, a B-class (Atlantic 85), Doris Day and Brian (B-914), on station since 2019, and the smaller D-class (IB1), Burnham Reach (D-801), on station since 2016.

== History ==
Burnham-on-Sea is on the Bristol Channel near the mouth of the River Parrett. Ships entering the river to Bridgwater have to negotiate sand banks and mudflats. The first lifeboat at Burnham-on-Sea was a 26 ft (7.9 m) Palmer-class 6-oared lifeboat, built by Taylor of Blackwall, London in 1836. With the assistance of the Royal National Institution for the Preservation of Life from Shipwreck (RNIPLS), the boat was the gift of Sir Peregrine Acland, to the Corporation of Bridgwater.

No service records are known. After being on station for 10 years, the boat was condemned in 1846. The replacement boat provided in 1847 was a broad beam North Country type 10-oared lifeboat, funded by harbour dues, and built by John Gale of Whitby to RNLI standards. The boat was on station until c.1857, when it was reported to be damaged, and subsequently broken up. The boat was not immediately replaced.

In 1866, following negotiation with the Bridgwater Harbour Trustees and other "gentlemen of the locality", a new branch of the RNLI was established at Burnham-on-Sea. " It was thought desirable that a life-boat should be stationed there, as the ordinary shore boats frequently ran great risk in putting off to vessels in distress on the outlying sandbanks in the vicinity."

A new boathouse was constructed, at a cost of £207, and a 32 ft 0 in (9.75 m) self-righting 'Pulling and Sailing' (P&S) lifeboat, one with sails and 10 oars, was provided to the station. The station, lifeboat, and transporting carriage, were funded from the Cheltenham Lifeboat Fund, raised due to the efforts of the Rev. W. Hodgson, Capt. A. W. Young, R.N., and Mr. Witchell, a bookseller.

In recognition of the funding, the boat was first transported to Cheltenham, where on the 10 October 1866, the boat was presented to the Institution by Charles Schreiber MP, and then named Cheltenham by Lady Charlotte Schreiber, before being launched on demonstration on Pittville Lake. The lifeboat and carriage were then transported to Burnham-on-Sea, conveyed on both journeys free of charge by the Great Western and Bristol and Exeter Railway Companies.

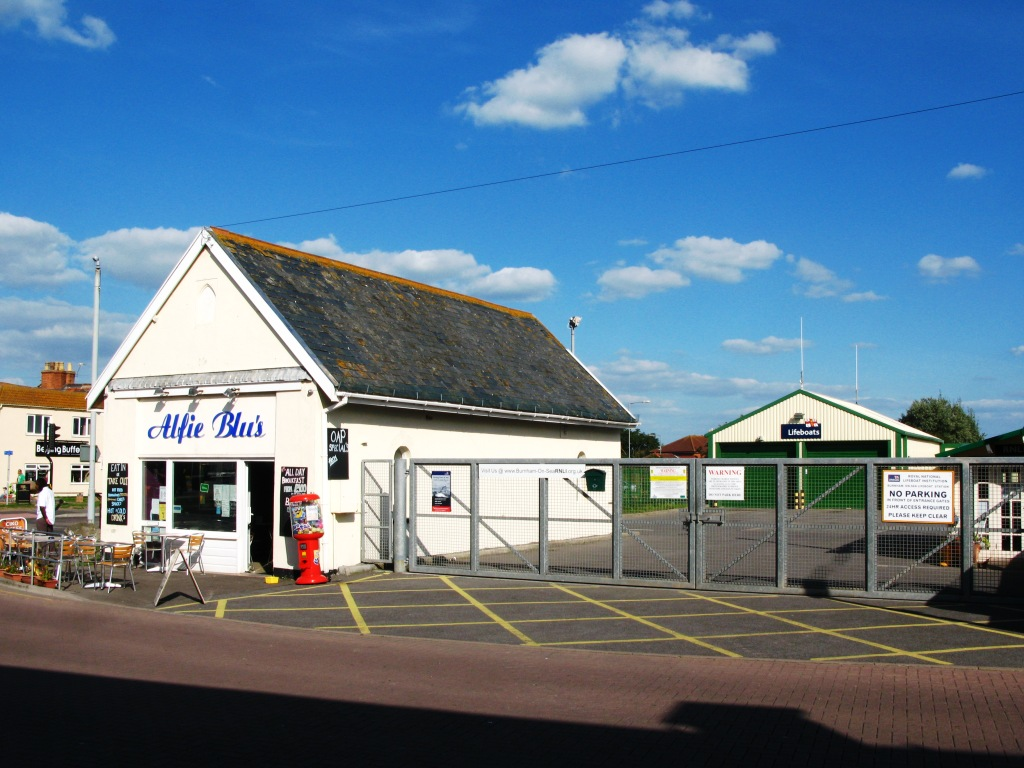
The 1874 boat house, seen in 2010

In 1874, a new boathouse was constructed on Pier Street next to the railway station, at a cost of £219-5s. A railway siding was laid to the boat house, allowing the boat to be hauled down the track on a carriage to the slipway. The RNLI annual report records the cost of a new carriage at £70.

Lifeboat records show the Cheltenham was launched 13 times on service, saving a total of 36 lives. The majority of calls seem to be vessels stranded on the approaches to Bridgwater, when the lifeboat was required to stand by until the vessel refloated. On 9 December 1886, the barque Fremad of Tønsberg, bound for Bristol from Nova Scotia, was stranded on Stert Island during a gale. 11 crew were rescued by the Burnham lifeboat.

By 1930, a decline in the number of trading sailing vessels, and an increase in motor-powered vessels, led to a dramatic reduction in calls for the lifeboat. Burnham's lifeboat Philip Beach (ON 498), by then on station for 28 years, had been launched just 3 times. With lifeboats still at Watchet and Weston-super-Mare, at a meeting of the RNLI committee of management on 17 July 1930, it was decided to close Burnham-on-Sea lifeboat station.

The Philip Beach was sold from service. The building has since had several uses, including being a scout hut and children's play centre.

Lifeboats returned to the town in 1994 when the Burnham Area Rescue Boat (BARB) provided an inflatable inshore rescue boat. However, in 2003, the service decided to change direction, and specialise on providing a hovercraft that could operate on the local mudflats. BARB asked the RNLI to take over the provision of a sea-going inshore rescue boat. A new lifeboat station was built near the old 1874 boat house, coming into operation on 23 December 2003.

In 2014, two members of the crew received signed Letters of Appreciation from the Chief Executive of the RNLI, for their part in the rescue of three teenagers, caught in fast flowing water at the end of Burnham-on-Sea jetty during the previous summer.

In 2016 Puffin (D-664), a D-class lifeboat (IB1) lifeboat, which had been in service for ten years, was replaced by a new craft, Burnham Reach (D-801), after a campaign raised nearly £50,000. It was felt appropriate to christen the boat with a jug of local cider, rather than the usual bottle of champagne.

== Launch method and area of operation ==
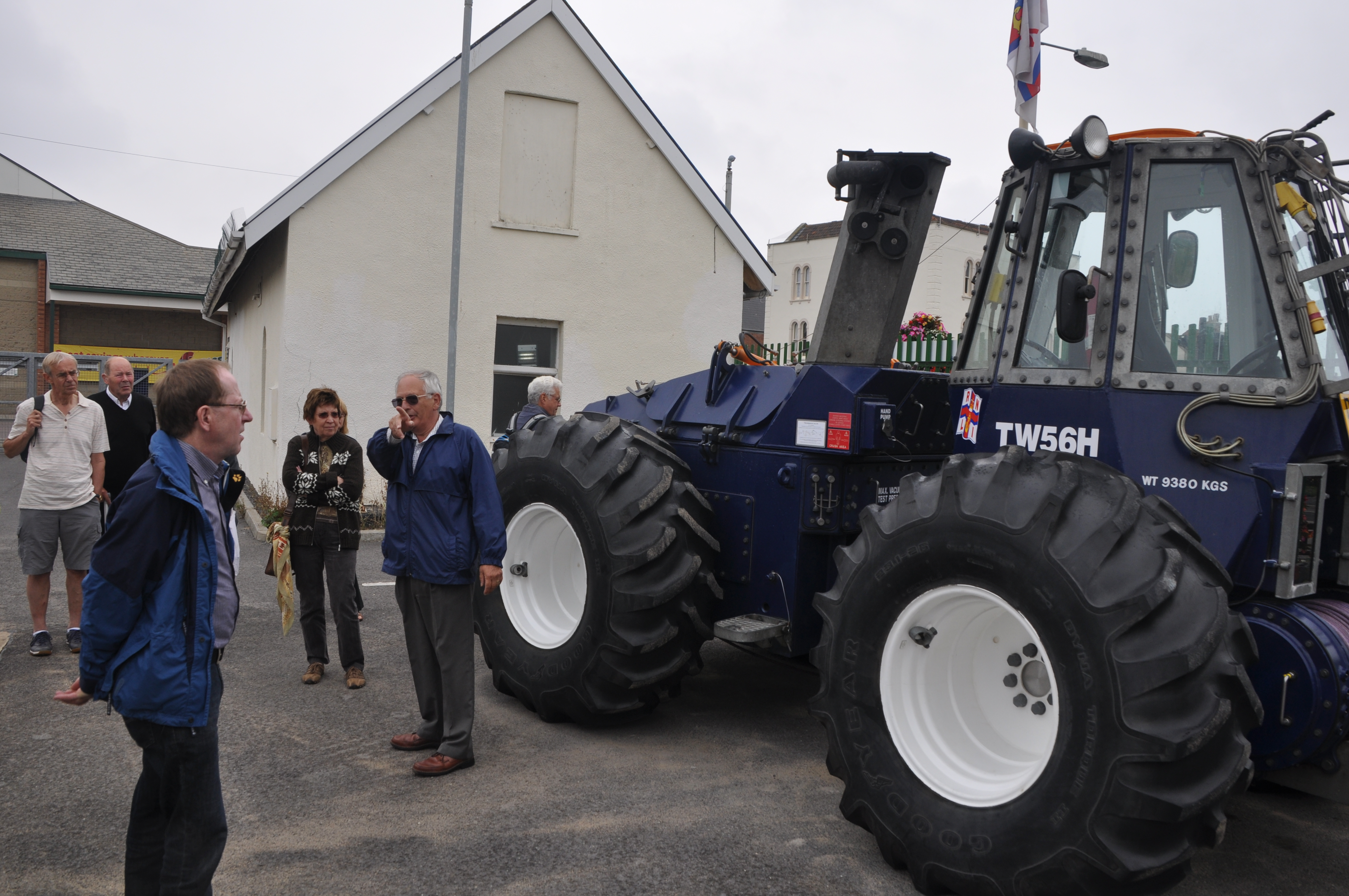
Talus MB-4H (TW56) at Burnham-on-Sea in 2011

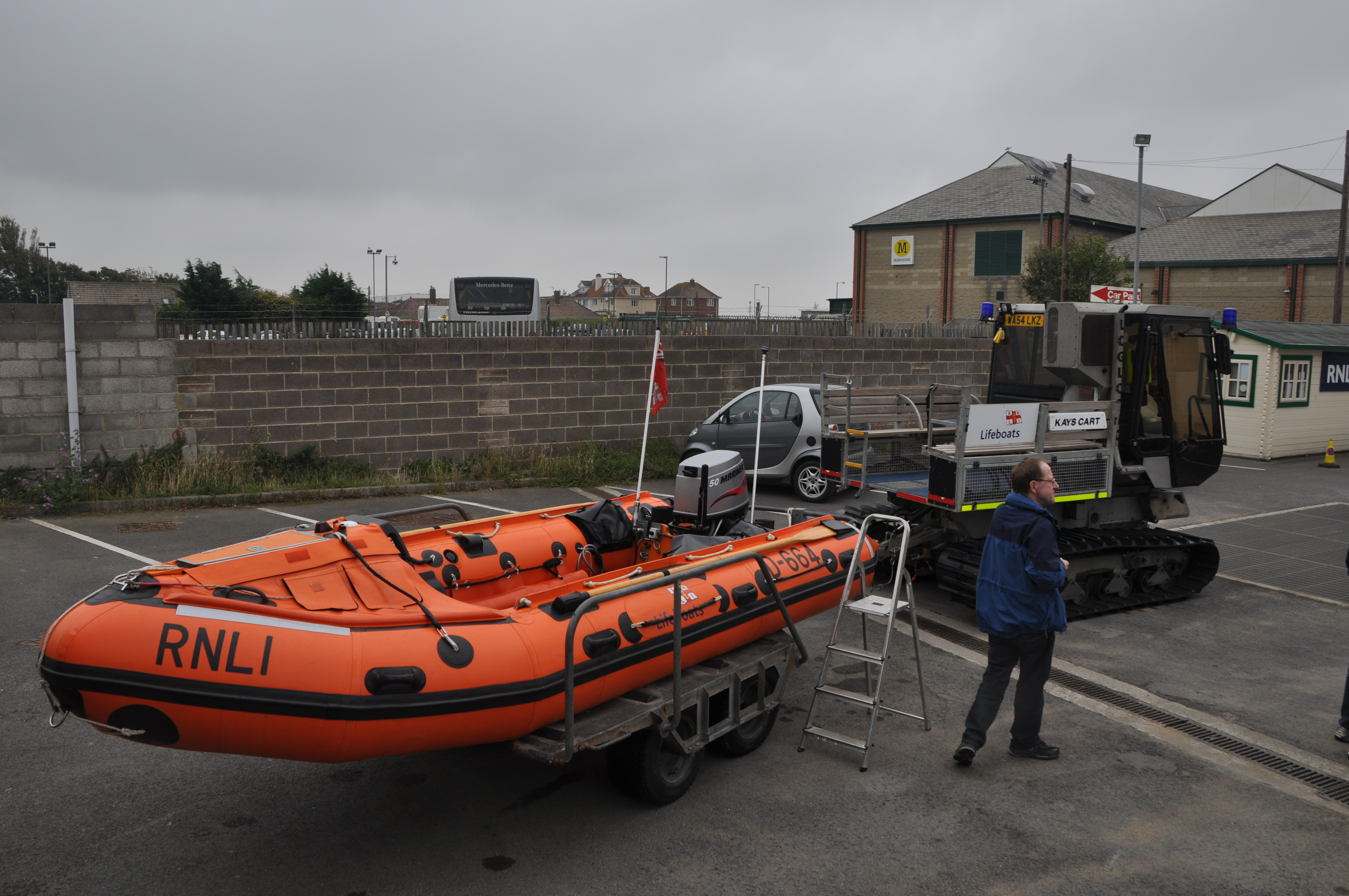
D-class (IB1) Puffin (D-664) (2006–2016) with Softrak (ST04) launch vehicle

The Atlantic 85 is launched using a Talus MB-4H amphibious tractor, using a Talus Atlantic 85 DO-DO launch carriage (Drive On-Drive Off) carriage, can operate in Force 7 winds (Force 6 at night), has a top speed of 35 knots (65 km/h) and a range of 2½ hours at maximum speed. The D-class (IB1), launched by the Softrak launch vehicle, has a top speed of 25 knots (46 km/h) and a range of 3 hours at maximum speed.

Adjacent lifeboats are at Minehead to the west, and Weston-super-Mare to the north. The nearest All-weather lifeboat is stationed at Barry Dock in South Wales.

== Burnham-on-Sea lifeboats ==
=== Bridgwater Harbour Trust lifeboats ===
On station	Name	Built	Class	Comments
1836–1846	Unnamed	1836	26-foot Palmer	(Note: 26 ft 3 in (8.00 m) x 6 ft 1 in (1.85 m) (6-oared) Palmer-class non-self-righting lifeboat, gift of the RNIPLS and Sir Peregrine Acland, built by Taylor of Blackwall, London, costing £67.); Condemned 1846.
1847–c.1857	Protector	1847	26-foot North Country	(Note: 26 ft 0 in (7.92 m) x 10 ft 6 in (3.20 m) (10-oared) North Country non-self-righting lifeboat, funded by Harbour Dues, built by John Gale of Whitby, costing £115.); Damaged and broken up, c.1857.

=== RNLI lifeboats ===
==== Pulling and Sailing (P&S) lifeboats ====
On station	ON (Note: ON is the RNLI's Official Number of the boat.)	Name	Built	Class	Comments
1866–1887	Pre-472	Cheltenham	1866	32-foot Prowse Self-righting (P&S)	(Note: 32 ft 0 in (9.75 m) x 7 ft 5 in (2.26 m) Prowse-class self-righting (P&S) lifeboat, gift of the Cheltenham LB fund, built by Woolfe of Shadwell, London, costing £256.); Sold 1888.
1887–1902	138	John Godfrey Morris	1887	34-foot Self-righting (P&S)	(Note: 34 ft 0 in (10.36 m) x 7 ft 6 in (2.29 m) (10-oared) self-righting (P&S) lifeboat, legacy of Mr J. G. Morris of Birkenhead, built by Forrestt of Limehouse, London, costing £406.); Broken up, September 1903.
1902–1930	498	Philip Beach	1902	35-foot Liverpool (P&S)	(Note: 35 ft 0 in (10.67 m) x 10 ft 0 in (3.05 m) (10/12-oared) Liverpool-class non-self-righting (P&S) lifeboat, legacy of Mrs S. Beach of London, built by Thames Ironworks of Blackwall, London, costing £837.); Sold 1930. Renamed Burnlibo. Last reported as a twin-engined ketch at Liverpool, 1957.

Station closed, 1930.
Pre ON numbers are unofficial numbers used by the Lifeboat Enthusiasts' Society to reference early lifeboats not included on the official RNLI list.

=== Inshore lifeboats ===
==== D-class ====
On station	Op. No. (Note: Op. No. is the RNLI's Operational Number of the boat carried on the hull.)	Name	Class	Comments
2003–2004	D-424	City of Chester	D-class (EA16)	Originally stationed at Fleetwood in 1992.
2004–2005	D-495	Elsie Frances II	D-class (EA16)	Originally stationed at Bude in 1996.
2005–2006	D-552	Global Marine	D-class (EA16)	Originally stationed at Marazion in 1999.
2006–2016	D-664	Puffin	D-class (IB1)	
2016–	D-801	Burnham Reach	D-class (IB1)	

==== B-class ====
On station	Op. No.	Name	Class	Comments
2003–2004	B-700	Susan Peacock	B-class (Atlantic 75)	The first Atlantic 75 lifeboat, used for trials from 1992.
2004–2018	B-795	Staines Whitfield	B-class (Atlantic 75)	
2019–	B-914	Doris Day and Brian	B-class (Atlantic 85)	

==== Launch and recovery tractors ====
On station	Op. No.	Reg. No.	Type	Comments
2003–2017	TW56Hc	DY52 EFR	Talus MB-4H Hydrostatic (Mk.2)	
2003–2005	ST01	WA53 LBG	Softrak (Mk.1)	
2005–	ST04	WA54 LKZ	Softrak (Mk.1)	
2017–	TW55Hc	DU52 XGA	Talus MB-4H Hydrostatic (Mk.2)	

== See also ==
- Burnham Area Rescue Boat
- List of RNLI stations
- List of former RNLI stations
- Royal National Lifeboat Institution lifeboats
- Independent lifeboats in Britain and Ireland
