= Weston-super-Mare Lifeboat Station =

RNLI lifeboat station In Somerset, England

- Flag of the RNLI

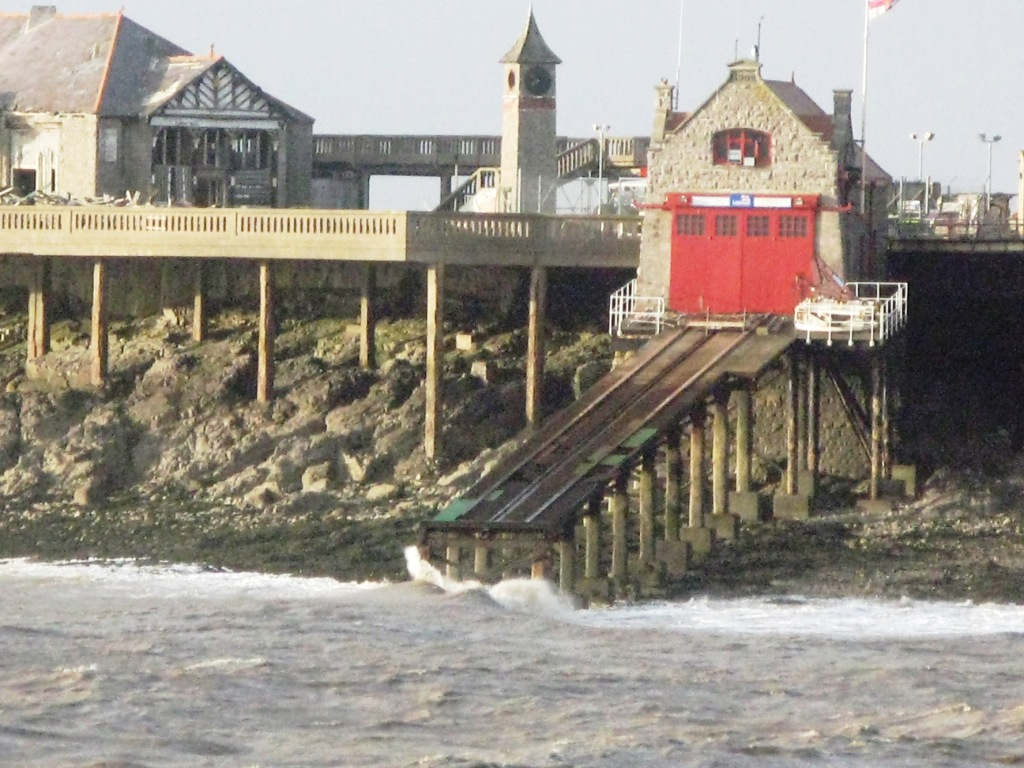
- The 1902 lifeboat house on Birnbeck Island, used from 1903 until 2014

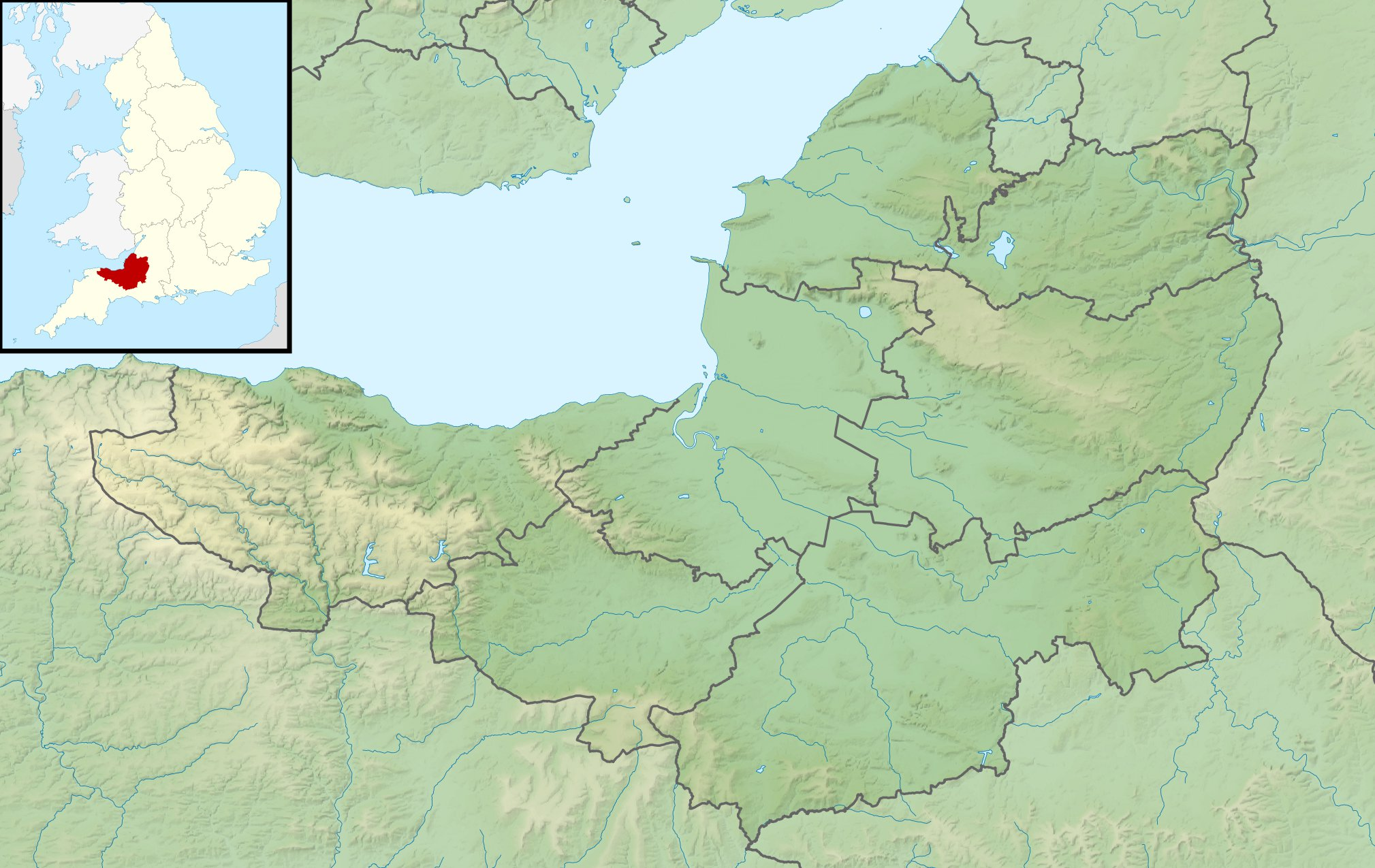
- Location within Somerset

General information
- Type: Lifeboat station
- Location: Knightstone Harbour, Weston-Super-Mare, Somerset, United Kingdom
- Coordinates: 51.3522°N 2.9881°W
- Opened: 1882
- Owner: Royal National Lifeboat Institution

Website
- Weston-super-Mare RNLI Lifeboat Station

Listed Building – Grade II
- Feature: Lifeboat house and slipway (Birnbeck Island)
- Designated: 18 May 1983
- Reference no.: 1137515

Weston-super-Mare Lifeboat Station is located in Weston-super-Mare, a seaside town and resort approximately 20 miles (32 km) south-west of Bristol, on the English side of the Bristol Channel, in North Somerset.

A lifeboat station was established at Weston-super-Mare in 1882 by the Royal National Lifeboat Institution (RNLI). For more than 100 years it was situated on Birnbeck Island but is now temporarily accommodated at Knightstone Harbour, until a new lifeboat station can be built nearby.

The station currently operates a B-class (Atlantic 85) Inshore lifeboat, Alexander (B-875), on station since 2023, and the smaller D-class (IB1) Inshore lifeboat, The Adrian Beaumont (D-832), on station since 2018.

== History ==
At a meeting of the RNLI committee of management, on Thursday 1 June 1882, following a visit to the town by the Chief Inspector of Lifeboats, it was decided to establish a lifeboat station at Weston-super-Mare, and that the cost of the station would be defrayed from the legacy of £500 from the late Colonel William James Holt, provided for the placement of a lifeboat on the shores of the Bristol Channel.

The Bristol Channel has an extreme tidal range which made it difficult for the RNLI to find a site from which a lifeboat could be easily launched at all states of the tide. In 1882 they installed davits on Birnbeck Pier, which linked the mainland with Birnbeck Island, from which the lifeboat could be launched, like a ship's lifeboat, into the water below, even at low tide. A much smaller than usual lifeboat, at just 25-foot (7.6 m), but suited to launch by davit, was sent to the station on 5 November 1882, and named William James Holt (ON 249), as per the donor's wishes.

On 22 September 1884, after departing the Pier at Weston-super-Mare bound for Bristol, the steamship S.S. Welsh Prince of Newport suffered a fouled propeller, and drifted ashore at Sand Bay. In a strong NW wind and rough seas, the William James Holt was launched, and 40 passengers were taken off the vessel in two trips. The vessel was later re-floated.

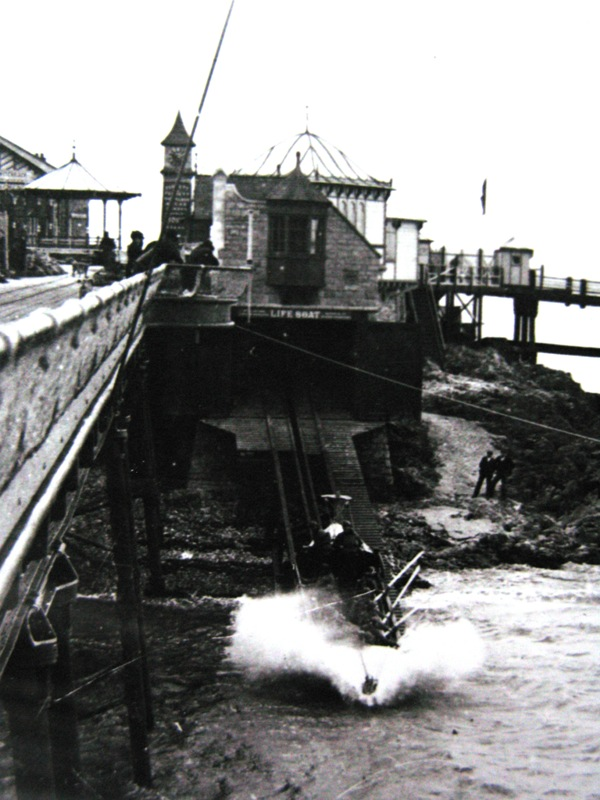
The second William James Holt (ON 249) being launched from the north boathouse

A new lifeboat house was constructed on the north east side of Birnbeck Island in 1889, at a cost of £718-1s-4d, along with a 100 feet (30 m) slipway. This coincided with the arrival of a new much larger 34-foot (10 m) lifeboat, again provided from the legacy of Col. Holt, and again named William James Holt (ON 249).

The planned arrival of a larger 38-foot (12 m) Watson-class lifeboat in 1903 prompted the construction of a new boathouse in 1902, this time on the south-east side of the island. To accommodate the extreme tidal range, it required the construction of the longest lifeboat slipway in England, measuring 368 feet (112 m). The lifeboat was funded from the legacy of the late Mrs A. S. Stock of Weston-super-Mare, and was named Colonel Stock (ON 488) at her request.

It would be thirty years later in 1933, when a motor-powered lifeboat was assigned to Weston-super-Mare. The lifeboat, a 35-foot-6-inch (10.82 m) Liverpool-class, was the first motor lifeboat to be stationed in Somerset, and was one of five lifeboats funded from the legacy of the late Mr C.C. Ashley, who died in Menton, France in 1906. At a ceremony held on 27 June 1934, the new lifeboat was presented to the Institution by Mr. Charles S. Weir, LLB, on behalf of the donor. She was received by Sir Godfrey Baring, Bt, chairman of the Institution, who then presented the boat to the Weston-super-Mare branch. After a dedication by the Rev. Prebendary G. L. Porcher, rector of Weston-super-Mare, the lifeboat was named Fifi and Charles (ON 765) by H.R.H. Prince George, Duke of Kent, the boat taking the name of a previous lifeboat funded by Mr Ashley, Fifi and Charles (ON 577), which had served at Redcar from 1907 to 1931.

== 1966 onwards ==
In 1964, in response to an increasing amount of water-based leisure activity, the RNLI placed 25 small fast Inshore lifeboats around the country. These were easily launched with just a few people, ideal to respond quickly to local emergencies. In 1966, an Inshore lifeboat, (D-83), was placed at Weston-super-Mare.

In 1969, the Calouste Gulbenkian (ON 961) was sent away for maintenance. The relief lifeboat Rachel and Mary Evans (ON 806) was placed on station, but at 41-foot (12 m), was too long for the boathouse, and was moored off the pier. On 12 March 1969, in 50-knot gale-force conditions, the lifeboat broke free from her moorings, and was wrecked on Birnbeck Island. Subsequent examination at Barry Dock showed she was a complete write-off, and was broken up and salvaged for parts.

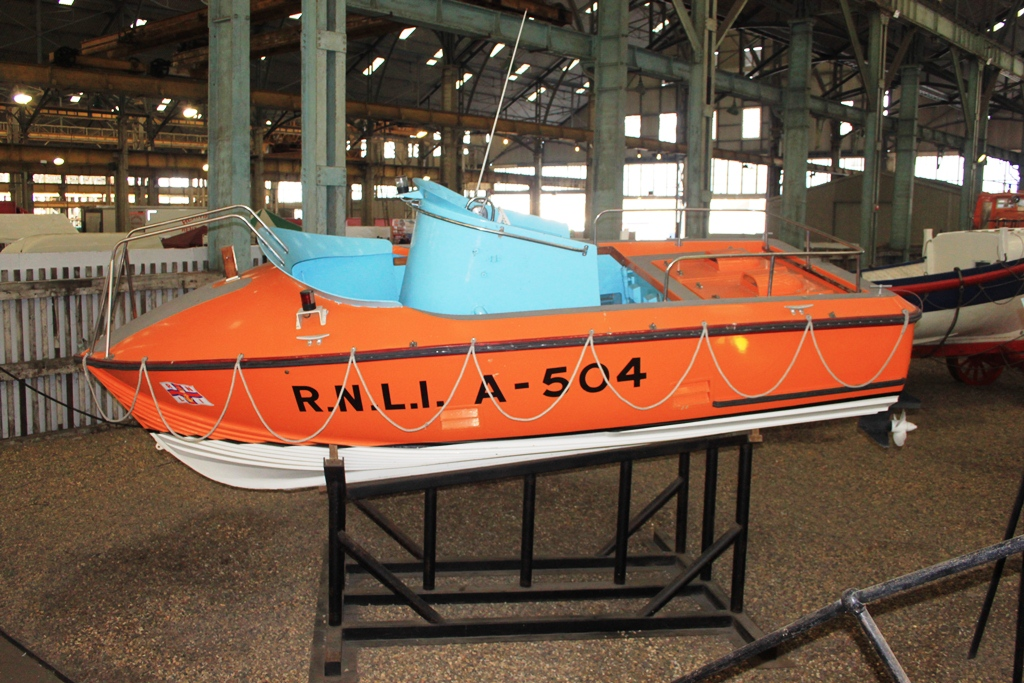
McLachlan-class lifeboat A-504 (previously 18-004)

It was decided to withdraw the conventional motor-lifeboat from Weston-super-Mare, and place one of the new small fast A-class (McLachlan) (18-004) lifeboats on station. The 18-foot (5.5 m) lifeboat was initially designated as an Offshore lifeboat. Until the new boat was ready, the station operated two D-class Inshore lifeboats. Calouste Gulbenkian would never return to Weston, and was reassigned first to the relief fleet, and for a short period at New Quay at the end of her service life in 1990. The lifeboat house was retained, and both boats could be launched down the slipway on a special carriage.

In 1973, the A-class (McLachlan) lifeboats were formally re-designated as Inshore lifeboats, and renumbered as A-class lifeboats. A-504 continued to serve at Weston until 1983, when she was replaced by the 7.21 m (23.7 ft) B-class (Atlantic 21) Weston Centenary (B-557).

A heavy storm in 1991 damaged a large part of the slipway. Repairs were undertaken by the following summer, with the two ILBs meanwhile moored afloat in the River Axe at Uphill. In 2007 the poor condition of the slipway again forced its closure. The launch site moved to an old slipway on the north side of the island. The crews continued to use the 1889 boathouse, but the lifeboats were kept on their launch trolleys on Birnbeck Island outside the boathouse. In April 2011 a new "temporary" boathouse was erected to give them cover. This cost £70,000 but can be removed once permanent facilities can be provided again and then reused elsewhere.

=== Knightstone ===
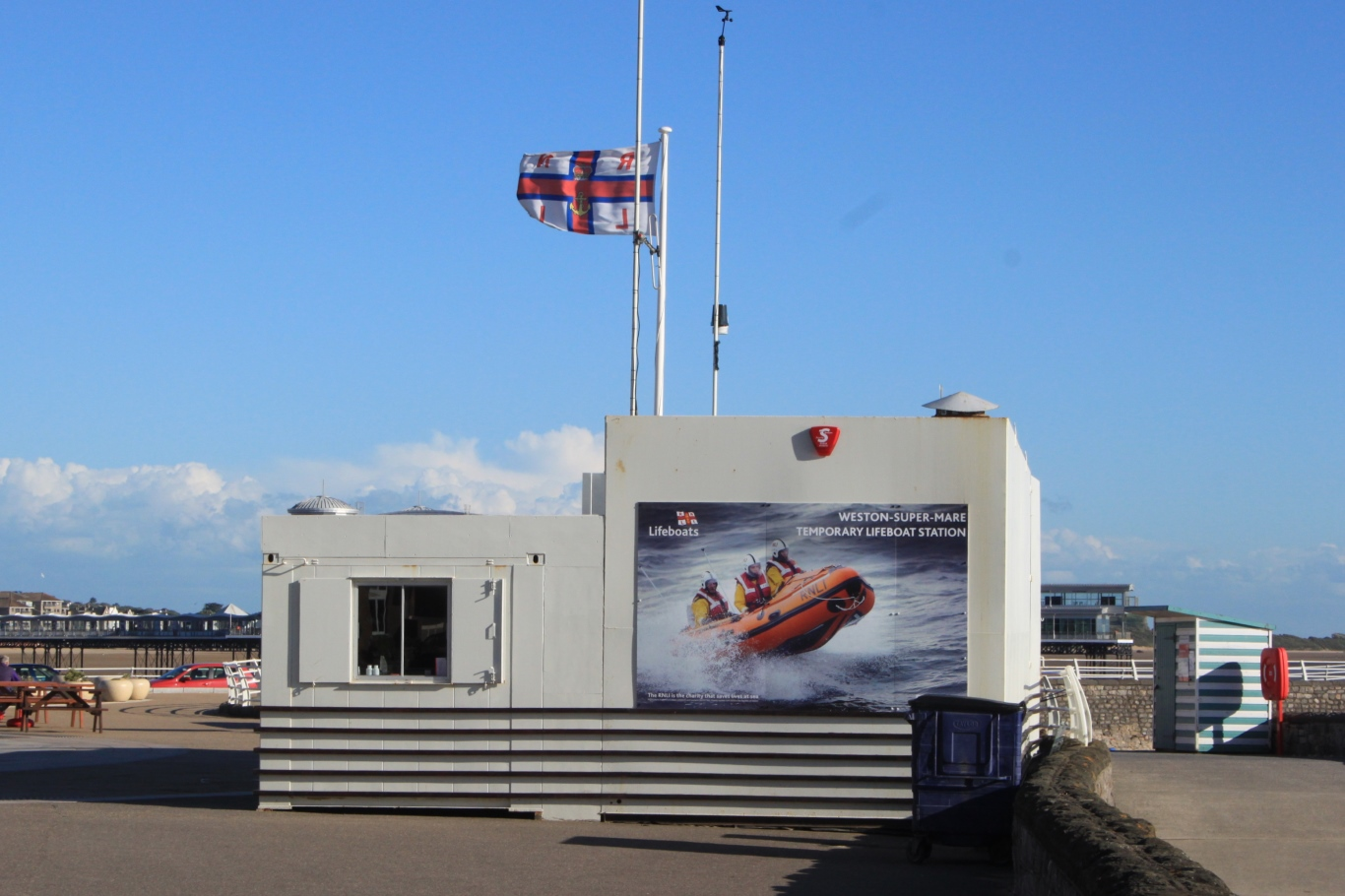
The temporary boathouse at Knightstone Harbour

The pier has been in poor condition for many years and has been closed to the public since 1994. The RNLI has laid boards on top of it to provide a safer access route for their volunteers but since December 2013 a portable building has been situated adjacent to the Marine Lake and the lifeboat can be launched using the slipway into Knightstone Harbour. This is not possible, however, at low tide. The larger lifeboat remained in the 'temporary' building on Birnbeck Pier for a while from which it could be launched when required at any state of the tide but only "when there is a significant risk to life". It has since joined the smaller D-class boat at Knightstone. In 2015 the RNLI announced that it would seek planning permission for a permanent lifeboat station at Knightstone Harbour along with deep-water anchorage at Anchor Head.

However it was revealed in 2020 that the RNLI could potentially take ownership of Birnbeck, which is subject to a compulsory purchase order by the local council.

=== Proposed return to Birnbeck ===
North Somerset Council bought Birnbeck Pier in July 2023 with the intention of repairing and restoring it and returning the lifeboat station Birnbeck island. The RNLI withdrew from the project in June 2025 due to concerns about financing the repairs and maintaining the pier when they were complete.

== Services ==
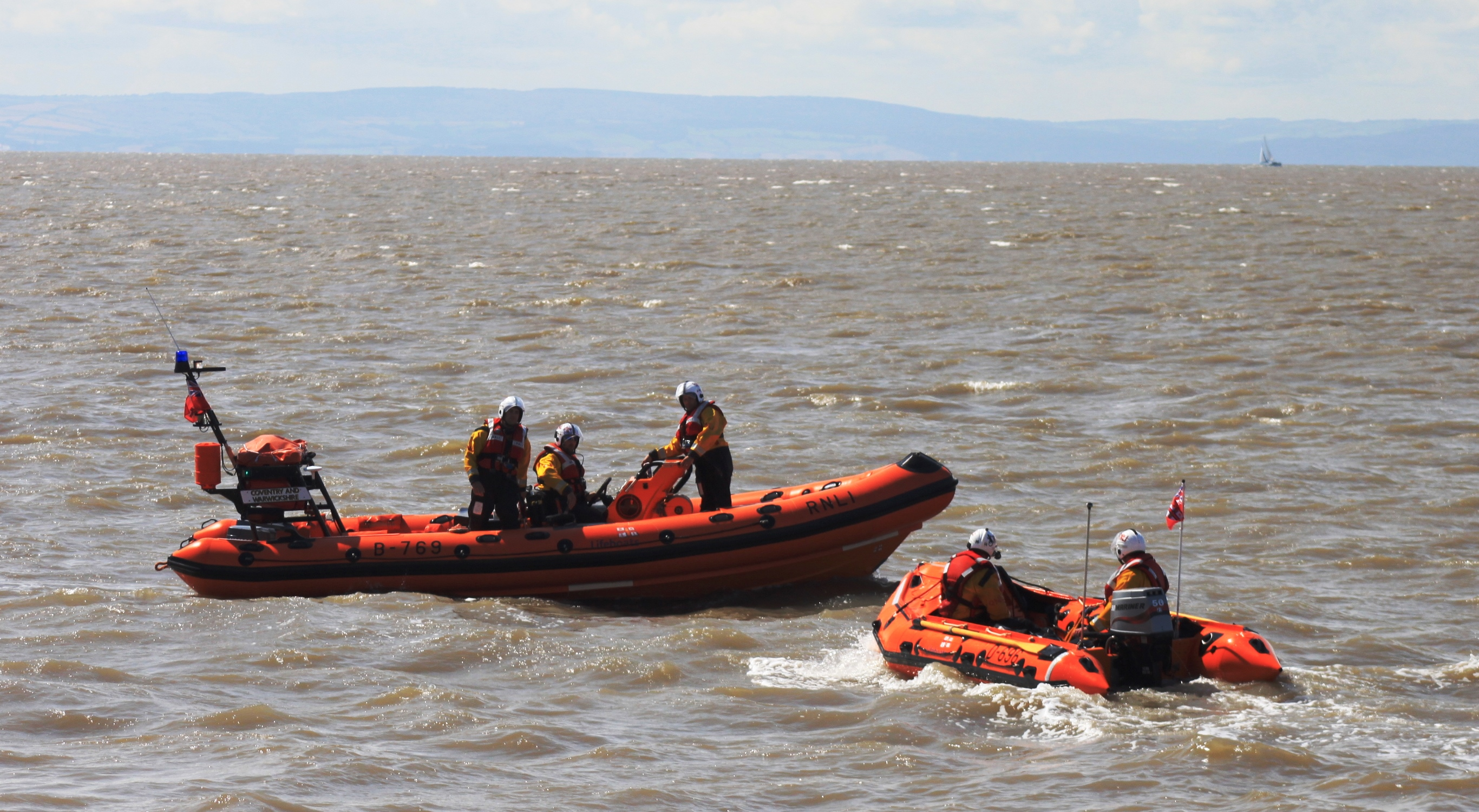
B-769 Coventry and Warwickshire (left) and D-696 Anna Stock (right)

The first lifeboat at Weston-super-Mare was on station for seven years but it was only involved in two rescues, including the SS Welsh Prince. In all, the pulling and sailing lifeboats that were stationed at Weston-super-Mare during the 51 years from 1882 to 1933 were only called out on 12 services and rescued 55 people. The motor lifeboats over the next 36 years were called out 104 times and rescued 89 people.

In common with other lifeboat stations, the number of service calls has increased significantly since the 1960s due to the rise in leisure craft and swimmers. A-504, the first large ILB, rescued 65 people in 172 services during its 13 years at Weston-super-Mare; the other ILBs have now made well over 1,000 service launches. Weston-super-Mare is the busiest RNLI station on the south side of the Bristol Channel. In 2010 it was called into action on 47 occasions, rescuing 27 people and a dog which had fallen down a cliff; in 2011 there were 42 launches totalling 133 hours at sea and resulting in the rescue of 19 people.

Late in the evening of 13 September 1975, ILB A-504 was launched info a Force 9 gale in response to a report of red flares being seen off Brean Down, the promontory on the south side of Weston Bay. The crew found a motor boat on rocks in a cove below Brean Down, with people both in the water and on the cliff above the boat. An anchor was dropped and the lifeboat used the tide to bring it as close as possible to the shore, the motors being lifted out of the water to allow it to get as closer. The people were then hauled through the water attached to a safety line. Helm Julian Morris was awarded an RNLI Bronze Medal for his outstanding seamanship, great skill and tremendous courage.

On the afternoon of 20 July 1986, Helm Morris took Weston Centenary to Brean Down to rescue two young boys who had been trapped by the tide, but he could only get to within 40 yards (37 m) of the shore. Lifeboat man Richard Spindler volunteered to swim through the 5 feet (1.5 m) high surf several times to take life-jackets to the boys and bring them back to the lifeboat. For this service, he was accorded "The Thanks of the Institution inscribed on Vellum".

== Area of operation ==
The Atlantic 85 can go out in Force 7 winds (Force 6 at night) and can operate at up to 32 knots (59 km/h) for 2½ hours. Adjacent ILBs are stationed at Burnham-on-Sea to the south, and Portishead to the north. If a larger All-weather boat is needed in the area, a Shannon-class is stationed across the Bristol Channel at Barry Dock.

== Station honours ==
The following are awards made at Weston-super-Mare.

- RNLI Bronze Medal
  Julian Morris, Helm – 1975
- The Thanks of the Institution inscribed on Vellum
  Bernard Watts – 1975
  Ian Watts – 1975
  Nicholas White, Helm – 1978
  Richard Spindler, crew member – 1978
  Anthony Blizzard, crew member – 1978
  Richard Spindler, crew member – 1986
- Vellum Service Certificate
  Julian Morris, Helm – 1978
  Michael Hawkins – 1978
  Julian Morris, Helm – 1986
  Michael Hawkins, crew member – 1986
  Nicholas White, crew member – 1986
- The Ralph Glister Award 1978
  (for the most meritorious service of the year performed by a rescue boat crew)
  Nicholas White, Helm – 1978
  Richard Spindler, crew member – 1978
  Anthony Blizzard, crew member – 1978
- Testimonial on Parchment, awarded by the Royal Humane Society
  Richard Spindler, crew member – 1978
  Anthony Blizzard, crew member – 1978
- Certificate of Commendation, awarded by the Royal Humane Society
  Nicholas White, Helm – 1978
- Letters of Thanks signed by the Secretary of the Institution
  Coxswain and crew of the Fifi and Charles – 1935
  Bernard Watts – 1969
  Michael Watts – 1969
- A Letter of Thanks signed by the Director of the Institution
  Mr John Dark, yacht owner
- Member, Order of the British Empire (MBE)
  Richard Spindler, Volunteer – 2016NYH
  Michael Buckland, Former Helm, Lifeboat Operations Manager – 2023KBH
- British Empire Medal
  Josephine Morea Allam, RNLI fundraising, W-S-M – 1983QBH
  Peter William Elmont, Chair, RNLI fundraising, W-S-M – 2021NYH

== Weston-super-Mare lifeboats ==
=== Pulling and Sailing (P&S) lifeboats ===
On station	Built	ON (Note: ON is the RNLI's Official Number of the boat.)	Name	Class	Comments
1882–1889	1882	259	William James Holt	25-foot Self-righting (P&S)	(Note: 25 ft (7.6 m) x 7 ft 3 in (2.21 m) (8/10-oared) self-righting (P&S) lifeboat, legacy of Col. W. J. Holt of Bangor, built by Woolfe of Shadwell, London, costing £266.); Transferred to Southend-on-Sea and renamed Boys of England and Edwin J. Brett.
1889–1903	1889	249	William James Holt	34-foot Self-righting (P&S)	(Note: 34 ft (10 m) x 7 ft 6 in (2.29 m) (10-oared) self-righting (P&S) lifeboat, legacy of Col. W. J. Holt of Bangor, built by Woolfe of Shadwell, London, costing £463.)
1903–1933	1902	488	Colonel Stock	38-foot Watson	(Note: 38 ft (12 m) x 9 ft 4 in (2.84 m) (12-oared) Watson-class non-self-righting (P&S) lifeboat, legacy of Mrs A. S. Stock of Weston-super-Mare, built by Thames Ironworks of Blackwall, London, costing £891.)

=== Motor lifeboats ===
On station	Built	ON	Op. No. (Note: Op. No. is the RNLI's Operational Number of the boat carried on the hull.)	Name	Class	Comments
1933–1962	1933	765	—	Fifi and Charles	Liverpool	Motor lifeboat with a 35 hp petrol engine. Sold and converted to a yacht, last reported at Redon, France, in 2008 carrying the name Wyvern.
1962–1969	1961	961	37-03	Calouste Gulbenkian	Oakley	Motor lifeboat with two 43-hp diesel engines. Became part of the RNLI reserve fleet until 1990 when it was stationed at New Quay. It was withdrawn in 1991 and is reported to be in Donaghadee for restoration.

=== Inshore lifeboats ===
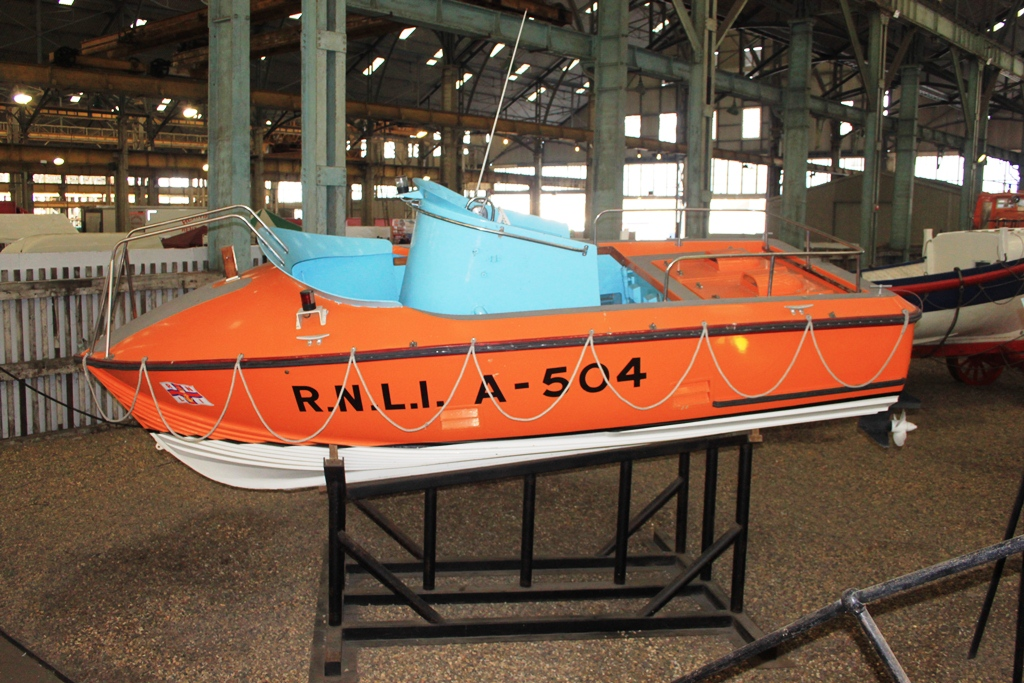
A-504
(1970–1983)

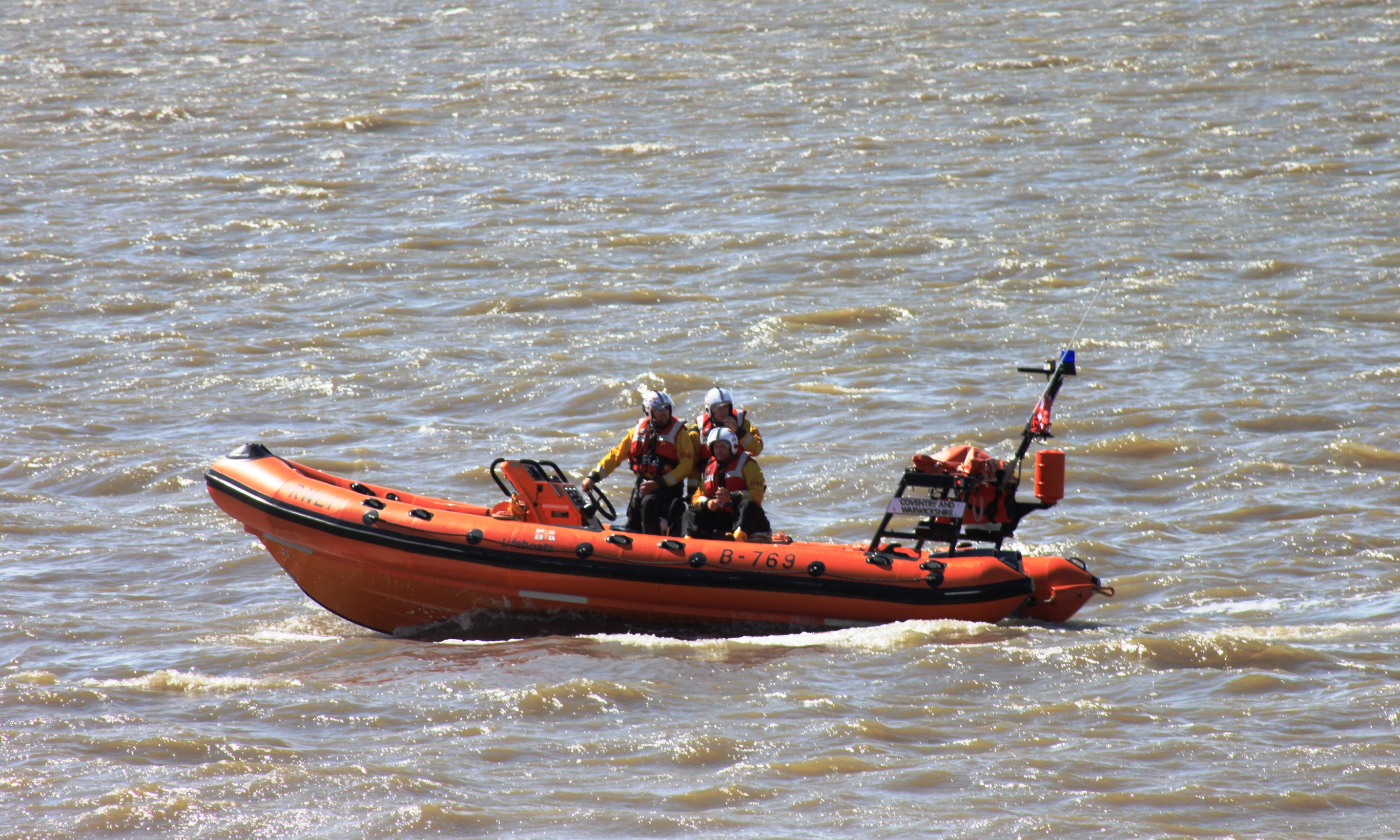
Coventry & Warwickshire (2001–2018)

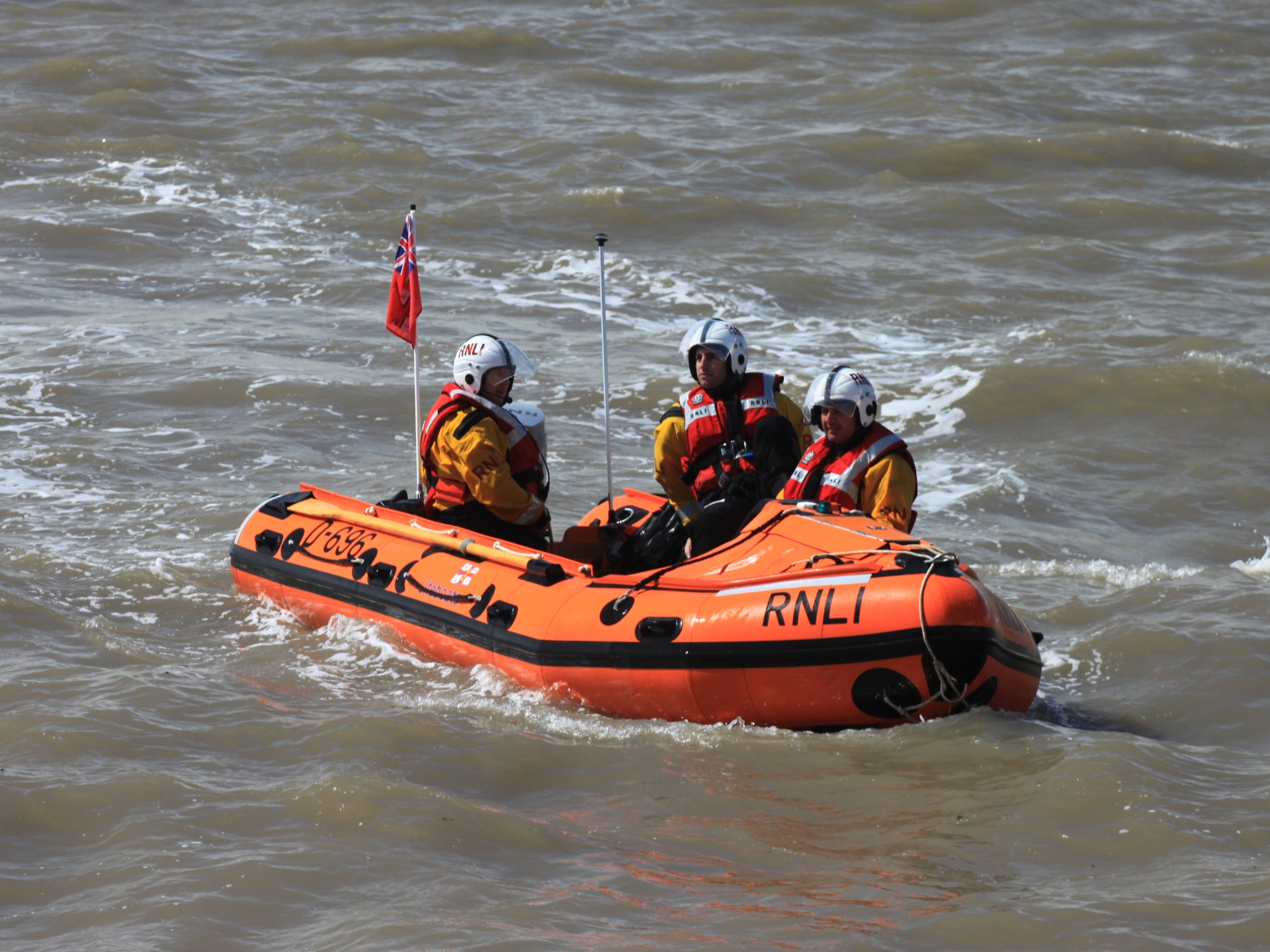
Anna Stock
(2008–2018)

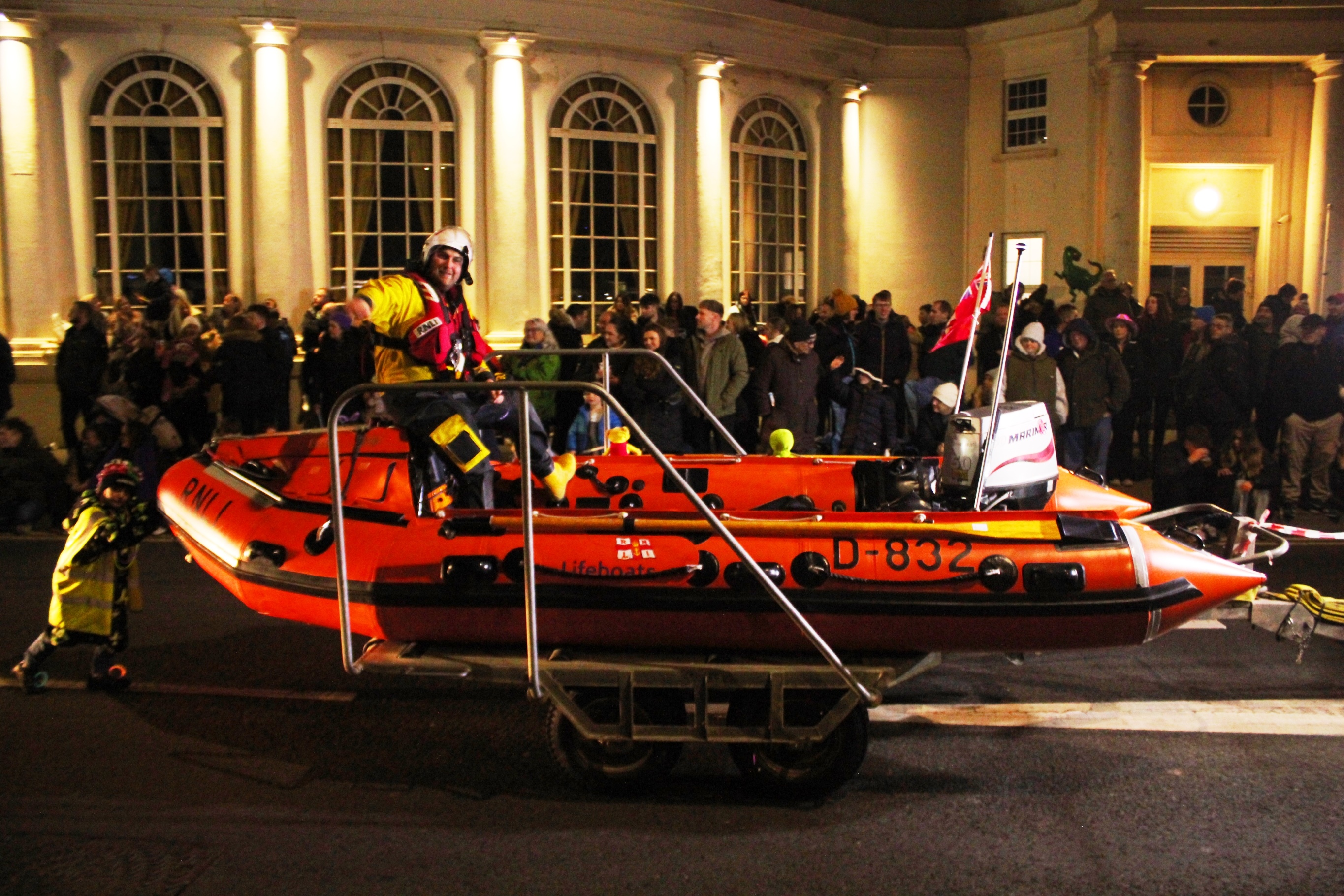
The Adrian Beaumont (From 2018)

==== D-class ====
On station	Op. No.	Name	Class	Comments
1966–1968	D-83	Unnamed	D-class (RFD PB16)	
1968–1972	D-74	Unnamed	D-class (RFD PB16)	First stationed at Tramore in 1965.
1969–1970	D-47	Unnamed	D-class (RFD PB16)	First stationed at Bournemouth in 1965.
1973–1981	D-170	Unnamed	D-class (RFD PB16)	First stationed at Arbroath in 1969.
1981–1989	D-282	Unnamed	D-class (Zodiac III)	
1989–1998	D-387	Boto-X 87	D-class (EA16)	
1998–2008	D-537	Faith	D-class (EA16)	
2007	D-570	Roger B. Harbour	D-class (EA16)	Previously Joan and Ted Wiseman 50 at Eastbourne in 2001.
2008–2018	D-696	Anna Stock	D-class (IB1)	
2018–	D-832	The Adrian Beaumont	D-class (IB1)	

==== A-class ====
On station	Op. No.	Name	Class	Comments
1970–1983	A-504	Unnamed	A-class (McLachlan)	Previously 18-004 until 1973. It is now preserved at Chatham Historic Dockyard. (Note: The small motor boats introduced in the 1960s were originally given operational numbers similar to larger boats, with the first two digits representing the length in feet. This was changed in the 1970s when they were renumbered as A-class inshore lifeboats. Weston-super-Mare's was number 18-004 until 1973 when it became A-504. It was the first production McLachlan boat and was displayed at the Earls Court Boat Show in January 1970 before taking up station at Weston-super-Mare on 9 May.)
1971	A-503	Unnamed	A-class (McLachlan)	Previously 18-02

==== B-class ====
On station	Op. No.	Name	Class	Comments
1983–2001	B-557	Weston Centenary	B-class (Atlantic 21)	
2001–2005	B-769	Coventry and Warwickshire	B-class (Atlantic 75)	Stationed at Plymouth in 2005 and 2006 and returned to Weston-super-Mare in 2008.
2005–2007	B-701	Gordon England	B-class (Atlantic 75)	First deployed as a relief lifeboat in 1993.
2007–2008	B-736	Toshiba Wave Warrior	B-class (Atlantic 75)	First deployed as a relief lifeboat in 1997.
2008–2018	B-769	Coventry and Warwickshire	B-class (Atlantic 75)	
2018–2019	B-787	Paul Alexander	B-class (Atlantic 75)	First stationed at Penlee in 2002.
2019–2021	B-794	Joan Bate	B-class (Atlantic 75)	First stationed at Salcombe in 2003.
2021–2023	B-830	Douglas Murray	B-class (Atlantic 85)	First deployed as a relief lifeboat in 2008.
2023–	B-875	Alexander	B-class (Atlantic 85)	First deployed as a relief lifeboat in 2014.

=== Launch and recovery tractors ===
Op. No.	Reg. No.	Type	On station	Comments
TW05	UJT 151S	Talus MB-764 County	2007–2011	
TW40	P472 CUJ	Talus MB-764 County	2011–2012	
TW11	B251 HUX	Talus MB-764 County	2012–2015	
TW02	LRU 581P	Talus MB-764 County	2015–2023	
TW40	P472 CUJ	Talus MB-764 County	2023–2025	
TW35	N506 WNT	Talus MB-764 County	2025–	

== See also ==
- List of RNLI stations
- List of former RNLI stations
- Royal National Lifeboat Institution lifeboats
