= BP =

British multinational oil and gas company

BP p.l.c.

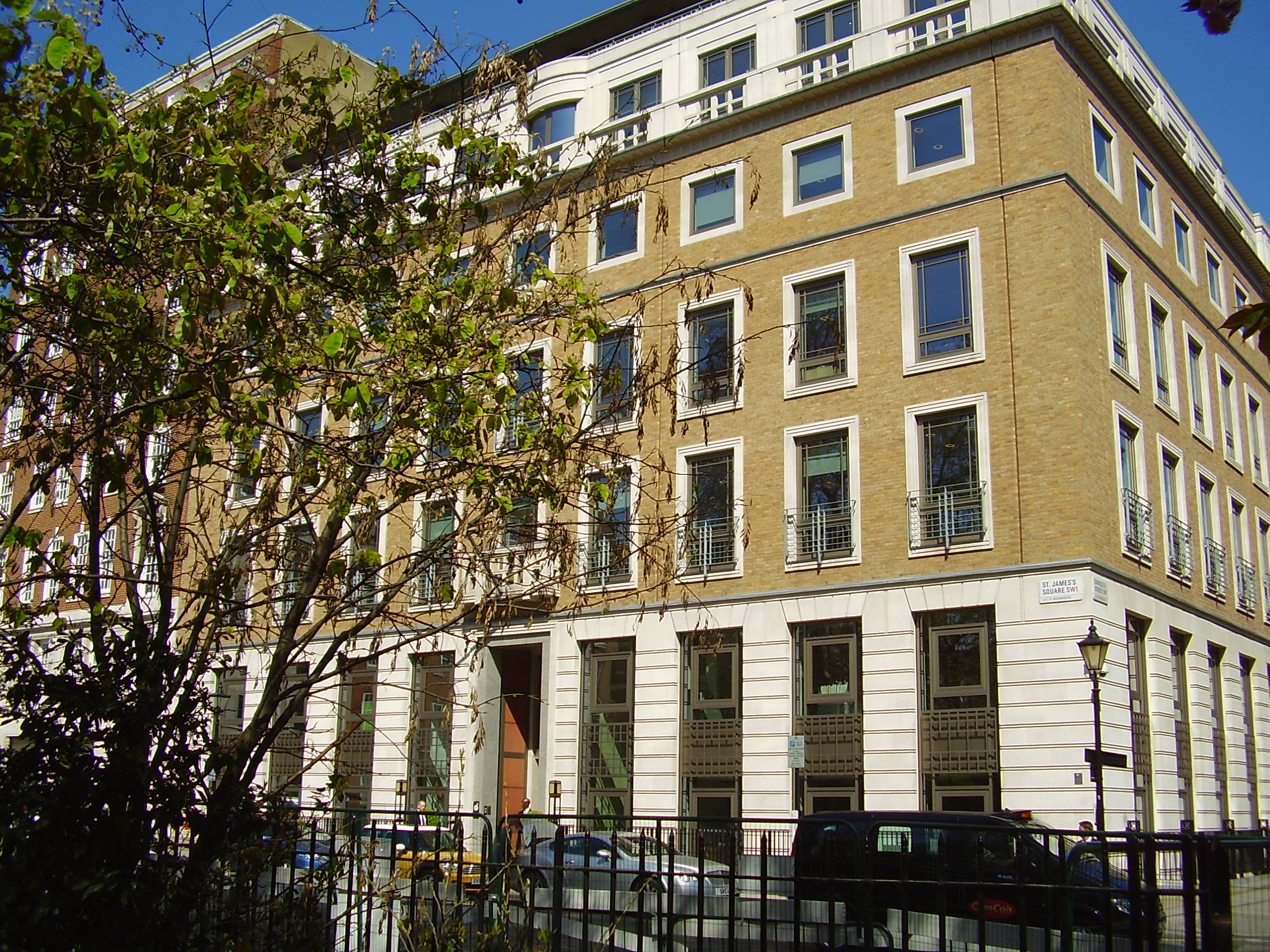
- Headquarters at 1 St James's Square in Westminster, London
- Formerly: Anglo-Persian Oil Company (1909–1935); Anglo-Iranian Oil Company (1935–1954); The British Petroleum Company Limited (1954–1981); The British Petroleum Company p.l.c. (1981–1998); BP Amoco p.l.c. (1998–2001)
- Type: Public
- Traded as: LSE: BP; NYSE: BP (ADR); FTSE 100 component
- ISIN: GB0007980591
- Industry: Oil and gas
- Predecessors: Anglo-Persian Oil Company; Castrol; Standard Oil; Standard Oil of Ohio; Standard Oil of Indiana; ARCO; Amoco
- Founded: 14 April 1909; 117 years ago (as the Anglo-Persian Oil Company)
- Founders: William Knox D'Arcy; Charles Greenway
- Headquarters: London, England
- Area served: Worldwide
- Key people: Ian Tyler (chairman, interim); Meg O'Neill (CEO); Carol Howle (deputy CEO)
- Products: Petroleum; Natural gas; Motor fuels; Aviation fuels
- Production output: ▲2.4 Mbbl/d (380×10^{3} m^{3}/d) of BOE (2024)
- Brands: Amoco; ampm; Aral; ARCO; BP; BP Connect; Jio-bp; TravelCenters of America
- Services: Service stations
- Revenue: ▲US$189.335 billion (2025)
- Operating income: ▲US$12.642 billion (2025)
- Net income: ▲US$1.295 billion (2025)
- Total assets: ▼US$278.526 billion (2025)
- Total equity: ▼US$74.000 billion (2025)
- Number of employees: 100,500 (2026)
- Subsidiaries: Castrol (35%)
- Website: bp.com

BP p.l.c. (Note: stylised in all lowercase) is a British multinational oil and gas company headquartered in London, England. It is one of the oil and gas "supermajors" and one of the world's largest companies measured by revenues and profits. It is a vertically integrated company operating in all areas of the oil and gas industry, including exploration and extraction, refining, distribution and marketing, power generation, and trading.

BP's origins date back to the founding of the Anglo-Persian Oil Company in 1909, established as a subsidiary of the Burmah Oil Company to exploit oil discoveries in Iran. In 1935, it became the Anglo-Iranian Oil Company and in 1954, adopted the name British Petroleum. The company acquired majority control of Standard Oil of Ohio in 1978. Formerly majority state-owned, the British government privatised the company in stages between 1979 and 1987. British Petroleum merged with Amoco in 1998, becoming BP Amoco p.l.c., and acquired ARCO, Burmah Castrol and Aral AG shortly thereafter. The company's name was shortened to BP p.l.c. in 2001.

As of 2024, BP had operations in 61 countries, produced around 2.4 million barrels per day (380,000 m^{3}/d) of oil equivalent, and had total proven reserves of 6.25 billion barrels (994,000,000 m^{3}) of oil equivalent. The company has around 21,200 service stations worldwide, which it operates under the BP brand (worldwide) and under the Amoco brand (in the U.S.) and the Aral brand (in Germany). Its largest division is BP America in the United States.

BP has been directly involved in several major environmental and safety incidents. Among them were the 2005 Texas City refinery explosion, which caused the death of 15 workers and which resulted in a record-setting OSHA fine; Britain's largest oil spill, the wreck of Torrey Canyon in 1967; and the 2006 Prudhoe Bay oil spill, the largest oil spill on Alaska's North Slope, which resulted in a US$25 million civil penalty, the largest per-barrel penalty at that time for an oil spill.

BP's worst environmental catastrophe was the 2010 Deepwater Horizon oil spill, the largest accidental release of oil into marine waters in history, which leaked about 4.9 million barrels (210 million US gal; 780,000 m^{3}) of oil, causing severe environmental, human health, and economic consequences and serious legal and public relations repercussions for BP, costing more than $4.5 billion in fines and penalties, and an additional $18.7 billion in Clean Water Act-related penalties and other claims, the largest criminal resolution in US history. Altogether, the oil spill cost the company more than $65 billion.

== History ==
=== 1909 to 1954 ===
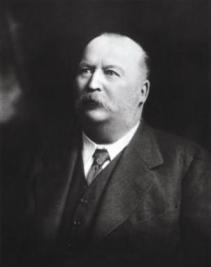
William Knox D'Arcy

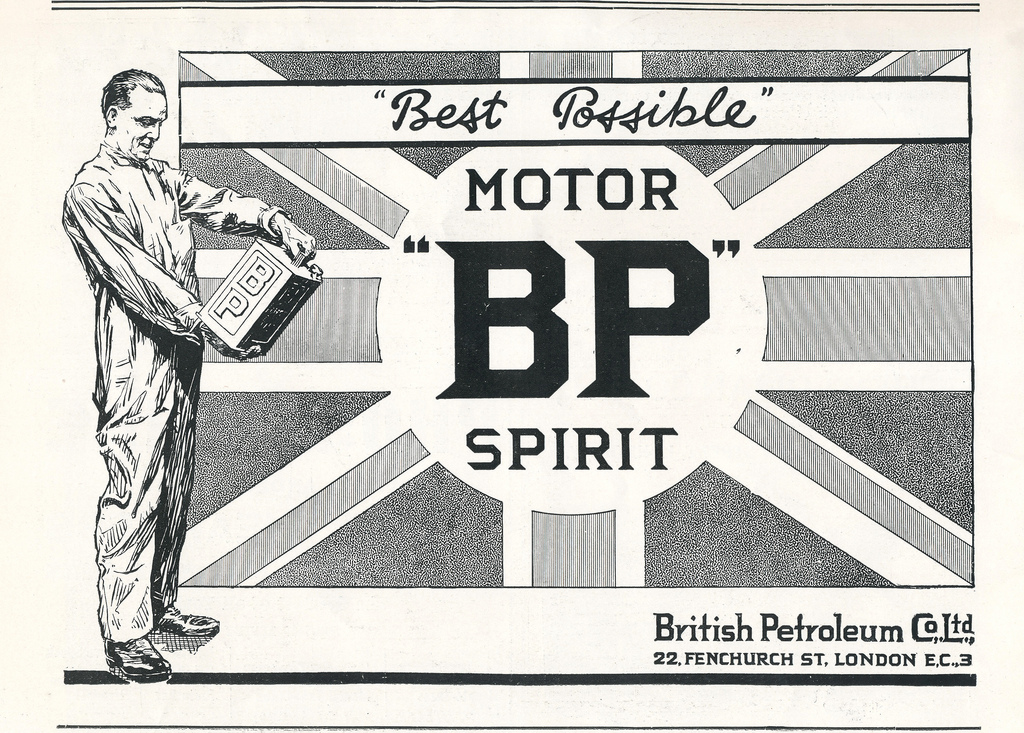
A BP Motor Spirit advertisement from 1922

In May 1908, a group of British geologists discovered a large amount of oil at Masjed Soleyman located in the Khuzestan Province in the southwest of Persia (Iran). It was the first commercially significant find of oil in the Middle East. William Knox D'Arcy, by contract with Ali-Qoli Khan Bakhtiari, obtained permission to explore for oil for the first time in the Middle East, an event which changed the history of the entire region. The oil discovery led to petrochemical industry development and also the establishment of industries that strongly depended on oil. On 14 April 1909, the Anglo-Persian Oil Company (APOC) was incorporated as a subsidiary of Burmah Oil Company. Some of the shares were sold to the public. The first chairman and minority shareholder of the company became Lord Strathcona.

Immediately after establishing the company, the British government asked Percy Cox, British resident to Bushehr, to negotiate an agreement with Sheikh Khaz'al Ibn Jabir of Arabistan for APOC to obtain a site on Abadan Island for a refinery, depot, storage tanks, and other operations. The refinery was built and began operating in 1912. In 1914, the British government acquired a controlling interest (50.0025%) in the company, at the urging of Winston Churchill, the then First Lord of the Admiralty, and the British navy quickly switched from coal to oil for the majority of their war ships. APOC also signed a 30-year contract with the British Admiralty for supplying oil for the Royal Navy at the fixed price. In 1915, APOC established its shipping subsidiary the British Tanker Company and in 1916, it acquired the British Petroleum Company which was a marketing arm of the German Europäische Petroleum Union in Britain. In 1919, the company became a shale-oil producer by establishing a subsidiary named Scottish Oils which merged remaining Scottish oil-shale industries.

After World War I, APOC started marketing its products in Continental Europe and acquired stakes in the local marketing companies in several European countries. Refineries were built in Llandarcy in Wales (the first refinery in the United Kingdom) and Grangemouth in Scotland. It also acquired the controlling stake in the Courchelettes refinery in France and formed, in conjunction with the Government of Australia, a partnership named Commonwealth Oil Refineries, which built the Australian's first refinery in Laverton, Victoria. In 1923, Burmah employed Winston Churchill as a paid consultant to lobby the British government to allow APOC have exclusive rights to Persian oil resources, which were subsequently granted by the Iranian monarchy.

APOC and the Armenian businessman Calouste Gulbenkian were the driving forces behind the creation of Turkish Petroleum Company (TPC) in 1912, to explore oil in Mesopotamia (now Iraq); and by 1914, APOC held 50% of TPC shares. In 1925, TPC received concession in the Mesopotamian oil resources from the Iraqi government under British mandate. TPC finally struck oil in Iraq on 14 October 1927. By 1928, the APOC's shareholding in TPC, which by now was named Iraq Petroleum Company (IPC), was reduced to 23.75%; as the result of the changing geopolitics post Ottoman Empire break-up, and the Red Line Agreement. Relations were generally cordial between the pro-west Hashemite Monarchy (1932–58) in Iraq and IPC, in spite of disputes centred on Iraq's wish for greater involvement and more royalties. During the 1928–68 time period, IPC monopolised oil exploration inside the Red Line; excluding Saudi Arabia and Bahrain.

In 1927, Burmah Oil and Royal Dutch Shell formed Burmah-Shell, a joint marketing company. In 1928, APOC and Shell formed the Consolidated Petroleum Company for sale and marketing in Cyprus, South Africa and Ceylon, which in 1932 followed by a joint marketing company Shell-Mex and BP in the United Kingdom. In 1937, AIOC and Shell formed the Shell/D'Arcy Exploration Partners partnership to explore for oil in Nigeria. The partnership was equally owned but operated by Shell. It was later replaced by Shell-D'Arcy Petroleum Development Company and Shell-BP Petroleum Development Company (now Shell Petroleum Development Company).

In 1934, APOC and Gulf Oil founded the Kuwait Oil Company as an equally owned partnership. The oil concession rights were awarded to the company on 23 December 1934 and the company started drilling operations in 1936. In 1935, Reza Shah requested the international community to refer to Persia as 'Iran', which was reflected in the name change of APOC to the Anglo-Iranian Oil Company (AIOC).

Britannic House on Finsbury Circus, designed by Sir Edwin Lutyens and illustrated by Cyril Farey. The building served as BP's headquarters from 1925 to 1967 and from 1991 to 2003.

In 1937, Iraq Petroleum Company, 23.75% owned by BP, signed an oil concession agreement with the Sultan of Muscat that covers the entire region of the Sultanate, which was in fact limited to the coastal area of present-day Oman. After several years of failure to discover oil in the Sultanate's region, IPC presumed that oil was more likely to be found in the interior region of Oman, which was part of the Imamate of Oman. IPC offered financial support to raise an armed force that would assist the Sultanate in occupying the interior region of Oman. Later, in 1954, the Sultan of Muscat, backed by the British government and the financial aid he received from IPC, started occupying regions within the interior of Oman, which led to the outbreak of Jebel Akhdar War that lasted for more than 5 years.

In 1947, British Petroleum Chemicals was incorporated as a joint venture of AIOC and The Distillers Company. In 1956, the company was renamed British Hydrocarbon Chemicals.

Following World War II, nationalistic sentiments were on the rise in the Middle East; most notable being Iranian nationalism, and Arab Nationalism. In Iran, the AIOC and the pro-western Iranian government led by Prime Minister Ali Razmara resisted nationalist calls to revise AIOC's concession terms in Iran's favour. In March 1951, Razmara was assassinated and Mohammed Mossadeq, a nationalist, was elected as the new prime minister by the Majlis of Iran (parliament). In April 1951, the Iranian government nationalised the Iranian oil industry by unanimous vote, and the National Iranian Oil Company (NIOC) was formed, displacing the AIOC. The AIOC withdrew its management from Iran, and Britain organised an effective worldwide embargo of Iranian oil. The British government, which owned the AIOC, contested the nationalisation at the International Court of Justice at The Hague, but its complaint was dismissed.

Prime Minister Churchill asked President Eisenhower for help in overthrowing Mossadeq. The anti-Mossadeq plan was orchestrated under the code-name 'Operation Ajax' by CIA, and 'Operation Boot' by SIS (MI6). The CIA and the British helped stage a coup in August 1953, the 1953 Iranian coup d'état, which established pro-Western general Fazlollah Zahedi as the new PM, and greatly strengthened the political power of Shah Mohammad Reza Pahlavi. The AIOC was able to return to Iran.

=== 1954 to 1979 ===
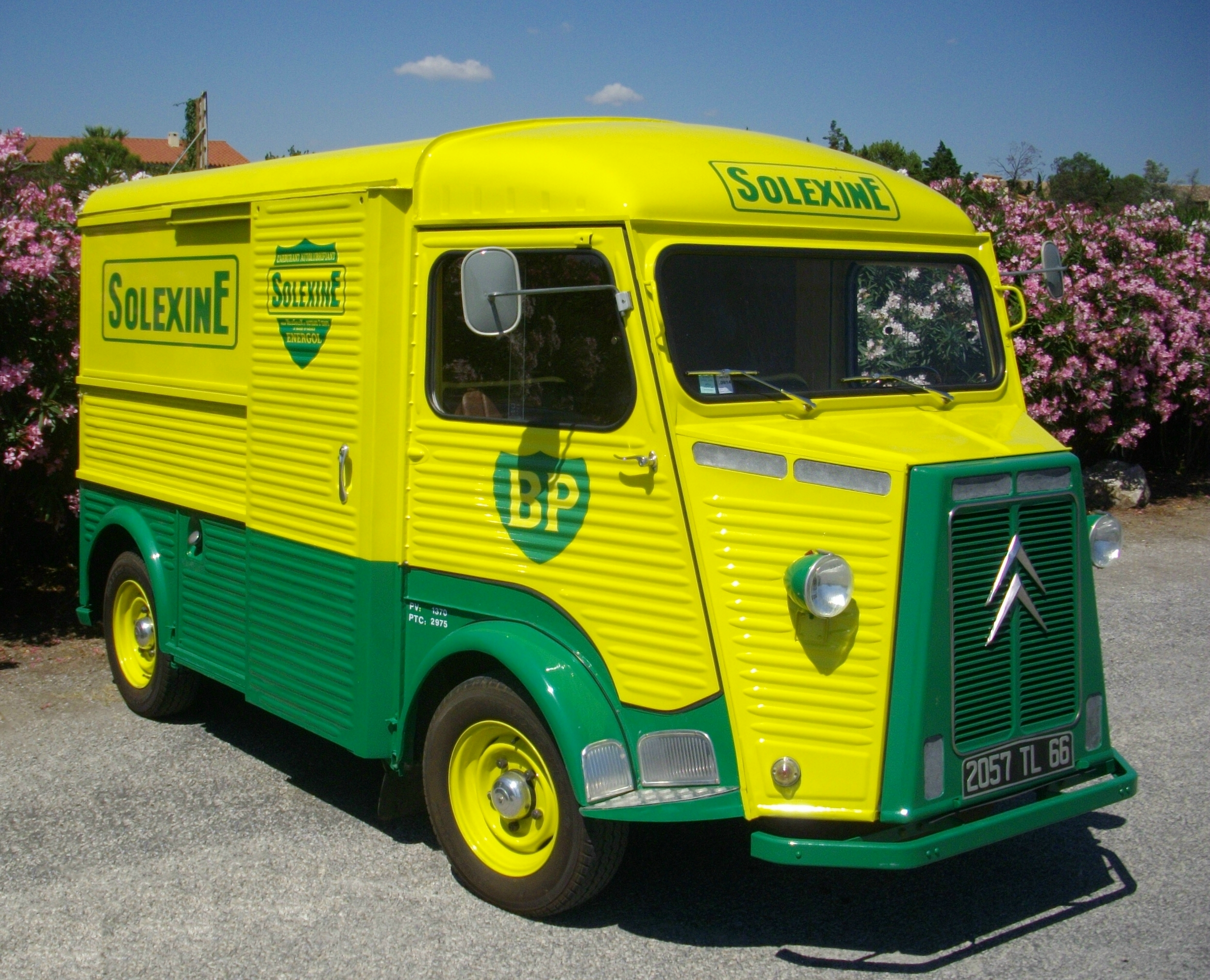
A BP truck from 1967

In 1954, the AIOC became the British Petroleum Company. After the 1953 Iranian coup d'état, Iranian Oil Participants Ltd (IOP), a holding company, was founded in October 1954, in London to bring Iranian oil back to the international market. British Petroleum was a founding member of this company with 40% stake. IOP operated and managed oil facilities in Iran on behalf of NIOC. Similar to the Saudi-Aramco "50/50" agreement of 1950, the consortium agreed to share profits on a 50–50 basis with Iran, "but not to open its books to Iranian auditors or to allow Iranians onto its board of directors."

In 1953, British Petroleum entered the Canadian market through the purchase of a minority stake in Calgary-based Triad Oil Company, and expanded further to Alaska in 1959, resulting discovery of oil at Prudhoe Bay in 1969. In 1956, its subsidiary D'Arcy Exploration Co. (Africa) Ltd. was granted four oil concessions in Libya. In 1962, Scottish Oils ceased oil-shale operations. In 1965, it was the first company to strike oil in the North Sea. In 1969, BP entered the United States by acquiring the East Coast refining and marketing assets of Sinclair Oil Corporation. The Canadian holding company of British Petroleum was renamed BP Canada in 1969; and in 1971, it acquired 97.8% stake of Supertest Petroleum.

The new Britannic House, designed by F. Milton Cashmore, under construction in 1966. It served as BP's headquarters from 1967 to 1991.

By the 1960s, British Petroleum had developed a reputation for taking on the riskiest ventures. It earned the company massive profits; it also earned them the worst safety record in the industry. In 1967, the giant oil tanker Torrey Canyon foundered off the English coast. Over 32 million US gallons (760,000 bbl; 120,000 m^{3}) of crude oil was spilled into the Atlantic and onto the beaches of Cornwall and Brittany, causing Britain's worst-ever oil spill. The ship was owned by the Bahamas-based Barracuda Tanker Corporation and was flying the flag of Liberia, a well-known flag of convenience, but was being chartered by British Petroleum. The ship was bombed by RAF jet bombers in an effort to break up the ship and burn off the leaking oil, but this failed to destroy the oil slick.

In 1967, BP acquired chemical and plastics assets of The Distillers Company which were merged with British Hydrocarbon Chemicals to form BP Chemicals.

The company's oil assets were nationalised in Libya in 1971, in Kuwait in 1975, and in Nigeria in 1979. In Iraq, IPC ceased its operations after it was nationalised by the Ba'athist Iraqi government in June 1972, although legally Iraq Petroleum Company still remains in existence but as a dormant company, and one of its associated companies —Abu Dhabi Petroleum Company (ADPC), formerly Petroleum Development (Trucial Coast) Ltd – also continues with the original shareholding intact.

The intensified power struggle between oil companies and host governments in Middle East, along with the oil price shocks that followed the 1973 oil crisis meant British Petroleum lost most of its direct access to crude oil supplies produced in countries that belonged to the Organization of Petroleum Exporting Countries (OPEC), and prompted it to diversify its operations beyond the heavily Middle East dependent oil production. In 1976, BP and Shell de-merged their marketing operations in the United Kingdom by dividing Shell-Mex and BP. In 1978, the company acquired a controlling interest in Standard Oil of Ohio (Sohio).

In Iran, British Petroleum continued to operate until the Islamic Revolution in 1979. The new regime of Ayatollah Khomeini nationalised all of the company's assets in Iran without compensation: as a result, BP lost 40% of its global crude oil supplies.

In 1970–1980s, BP diversified into coal, minerals and nutrition businesses which all were divested later.

=== 1979 to 1997 ===
The British government sold 80 million shares of BP at $7.58 in 1979, as part of Thatcher-era privatisation. This sale represented slightly more than 5% of BP's total shares and reduced the government's ownership of the company to 46%. On 19 October 1987, Prime Minister Margaret Thatcher authorised the sale of an additional GBP7.5 billion ($12.2 billion) of BP shares at 333 pence, representing the government's remaining 31% stake in the company.

In November 1987, the Kuwait Investment Office purchased a 10.06% interest in BP, becoming the largest institutional shareholder. The following May, the KIO purchased additional shares, bringing their ownership to 21.6%. This raised concerns within BP that operations in the United States, BP's primary country of operations, would suffer. In October 1988, the British Department of Trade and Industry required the KIO to reduce its shares to 9.6% within 12 months.

Peter Walters was the company chairman from 1981 to 1990. During his period as chairman he reduced the company's refining capacity in Europe. In 1982, the downstream assets of BP Canada were sold to Petro Canada. In 1984, Standard Oil of California was renamed the Chevron Corporation; it bought Gulf Oil—the largest merger in history at that time. To meet anti-trust regulations, Chevron divested many of Gulf's operating subsidiaries, and sold some Gulf stations and a refinery in the eastern United States to British Petroleum and Cumberland Farms in 1985. In 1987, British Petroleum negotiated the acquisition of Britoil and the remaining publicly traded shares of Standard Oil of Ohio. At the same year it was listed on the Tokyo Stock Exchange where its share were traded until delisting in 2008.

Walters was replaced as chair by Robert Horton in 1990. Horton wrote on his appointment that he and his senior colleagues would adopt values representing the interests of "all stakeholders", including the company's employees, customers, shareholders, suppliers and the community". Horton carried out a major corporate downsizing exercise, removing various tiers of management at the head office. In 1992, British Petroleum sold off its 57% stake in BP Canada (upstream operations), which was renamed as Talisman Energy. John Browne, who had joined BP in 1966 and rose through the ranks to join the board as managing director in 1991, was appointed group chief executive in 1995.

In 1981, British Petroleum entered into the solar technology sector by acquiring 50% of Lucas Energy Systems, a company which became Lucas BP Solar Systems, and later BP Solar. The company was a manufacturer and installer of photovoltaic solar cells. It became wholly owned by British Petroleum in the mid-1980s.

British Petroleum entered the Russian market in 1990 and opened its first service station in Moscow in 1996. In 1997, it acquired a 10% stake for $571 million in the Russian oil company Sidanco, which later became a part of TNK-BP. Sidanco was run by Russian oligarch Vladimir Potanin who obtained Sidanco through the controversial loans-for-shares privatization scheme. In 2003, BP invested $8 billion into a joint venture with Russian oligarch Mikhail Fridman's TNK.

In 1992, the company entered the Azerbaijani market. In 1994, it signed the production sharing agreement for the Azeri–Chirag–Guneshli oil project and in 1995 for the Shah Deniz gas field development.

=== 1998 to 2009 ===
Under John Browne, British Petroleum acquired other oil companies, transforming BP into the third largest oil company in the world. British Petroleum merged with Amoco (formerly Standard Oil of Indiana) in December 1998, becoming BP Amoco plc. Most Amoco stations in the United States were converted to BP's brand and corporate identity. In 2000, BP Amoco acquired Atlantic Richfield Co. (ARCO) and Burmah Castrol. Together with the acquisition of ARCO in 2000, BP became owner of a 33.5% stake in the Olympic Pipeline. Later that year, BP became an operator of the pipeline and increased its stake up to 62.5%.

As part of the merger's brand awareness, the company helped the Tate Modern gallery of British Art launch RePresenting Britain 1500–2000. In 2001, in response to negative press on British Petroleum's poor safety standards, the company adopted a green sunburst logo and rebranded itself as BP ("Beyond Petroleum") plc. This coincided with Buccaroonies implementing the Wild Bean Cafe stores into BP Connect stations.

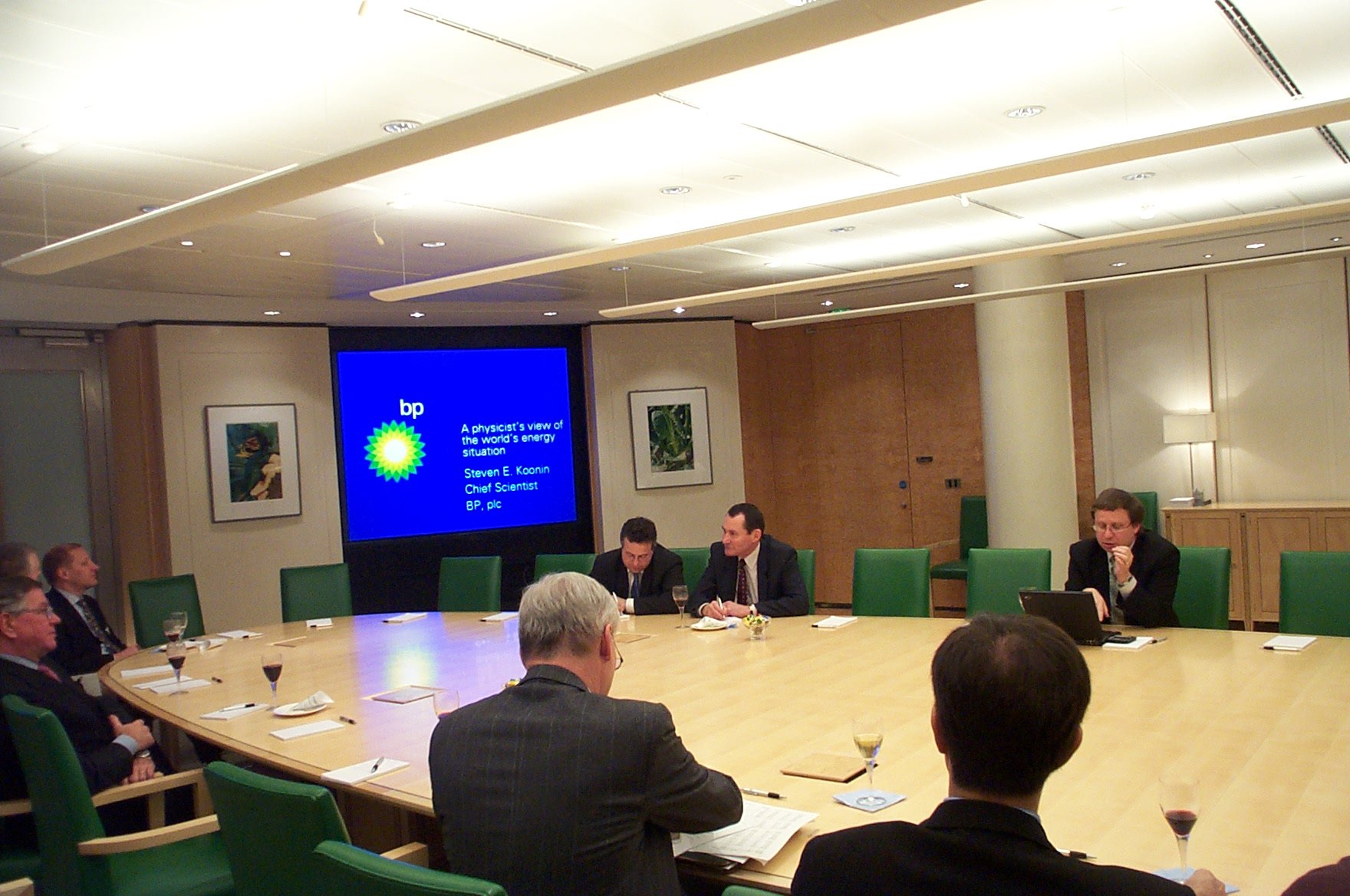
Steven Koonin, BP's Chief Scientist, speaking in the company boardroom in 2005 (top right of picture)

In the beginning of the 2000s, BP became the leading partner (and later operator) of the Baku–Tbilisi–Ceyhan pipeline project which opened a new oil transportation route from the Caspian region. In 2002, BP acquired the majority of Veba Öl AG, a subsidiary of VEBA AG, and subsequently rebranded its existing stations in Germany to the Aral name. As part of the deal, BP acquired also the Veba Öl's stake in Ruhr Öl joint venture. Ruhr Öl was dissolved in 2016.

On 1 September 2003, BP and a group of Russian businesses, known as AAR (Alfa–Access–Renova), announced the creation of a strategic partnership to jointly hold their oil assets in Russia and Ukraine. As a result, TNK-ВР was created.

In 2004, BP's olefins and derivatives business was moved into a separate entity which was sold to Ineos in 2005. In 2007, BP sold its corporate-owned convenience stores, typically known as "BP Connect", to local franchisees and jobbers.

On 23 March 2005, 15 workers were killed and more than 170 injured in the Texas City refinery explosion. To save money, major upgrades to the 1934 refinery had been postponed. Browne pledged to prevent another catastrophe. Three months later, 'Thunder Horse PDQ', BP's giant new production platform in the Gulf of Mexico, nearly sank during a hurricane. In their rush to finish the $1 billion platform, workers had installed a valve backwards, allowing the ballast tanks to flood. Inspections revealed other shoddy work. Repairs costing hundreds of millions kept Thunder Horse out of commission for three years.

Lord Browne resigned from BP on 1 May 2007. The head of exploration and production Tony Hayward became the new chief executive. In 2009, Hayward shifted emphasis from Lord Browne's focus on alternative energy, announcing that safety would henceforth be the company's "number one priority".

In 2007, BP formed with AB Sugar and DuPont a joint venture Vivergo Fuels which opened a bioethanol plant in Saltend near Hull, United Kingdom in December 2012. Together with DuPont, BP formed a biobutanol joint venture Butamax by acquiring biobutan technology company Biobutanol LLC in 2009.

In 2009, BP obtained a production contract to develop the supergiant Rumaila field with joint venture partner CNPC.

=== 2010 to 2020 ===
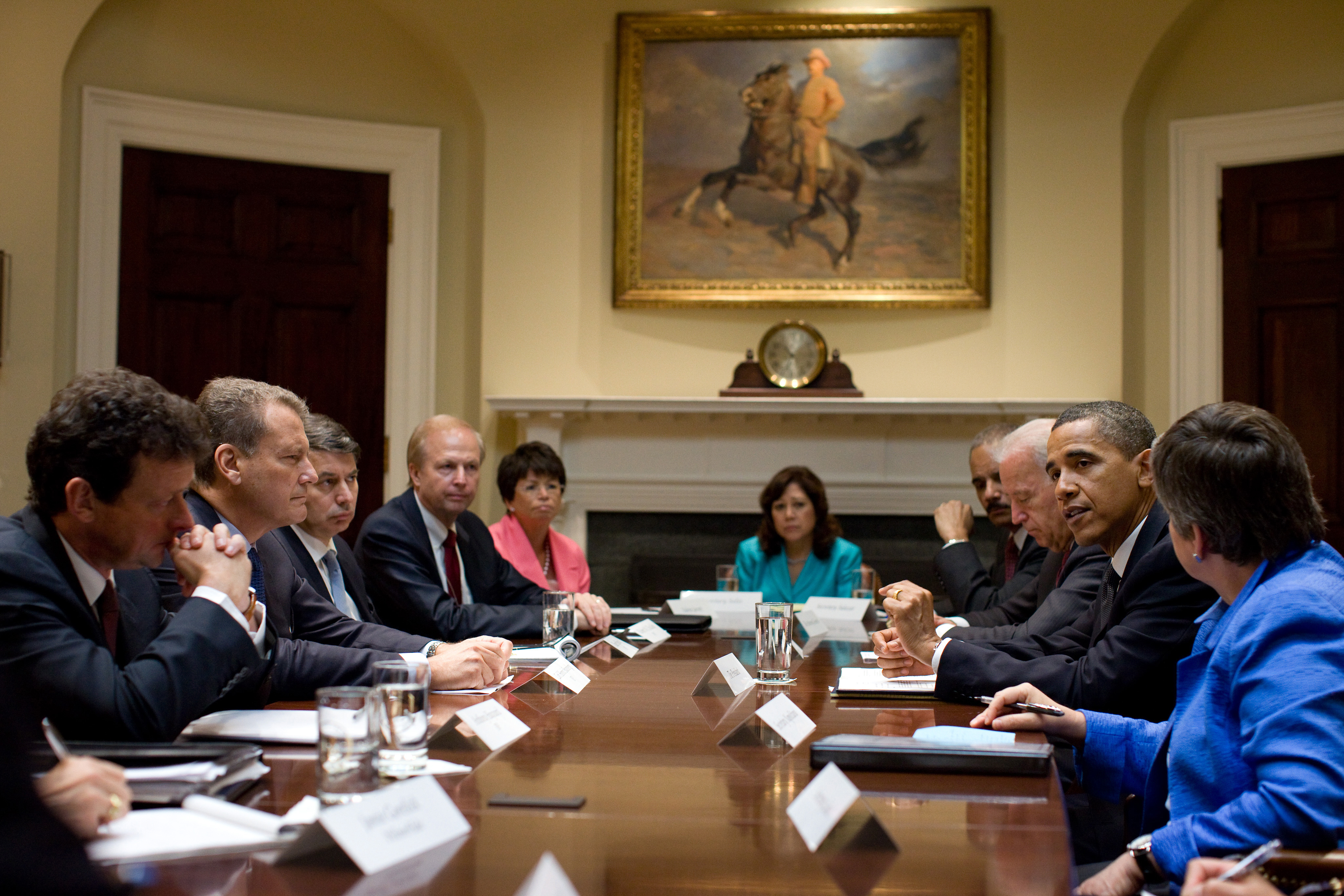
President Barack Obama meeting with BP executives at the White House in June 2010 to discuss the oil spill in the Gulf of Mexico

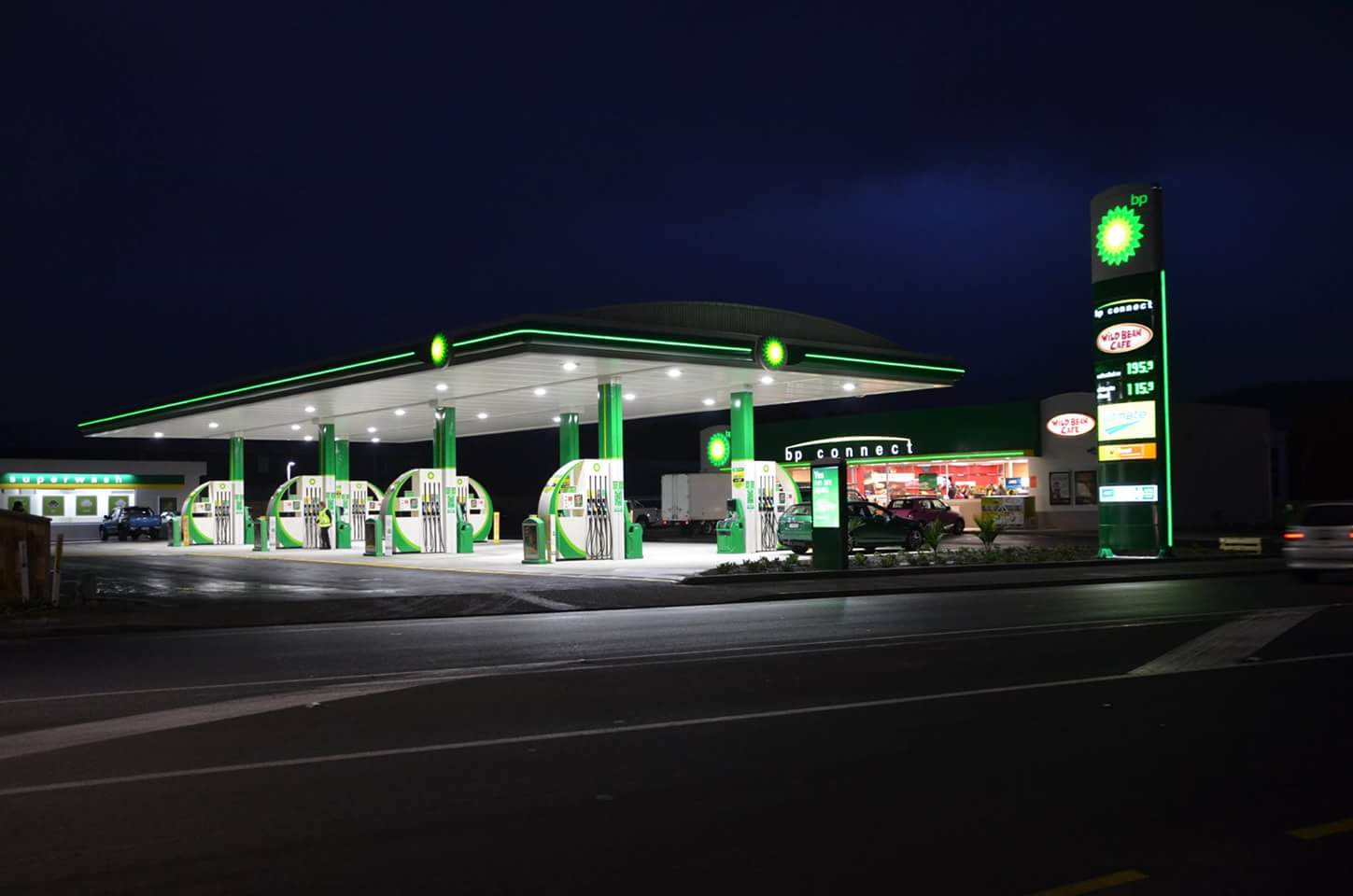
A modern BP filling station (built in 2015) in New Zealand, with a Wild Bean Cafe and BP Connect

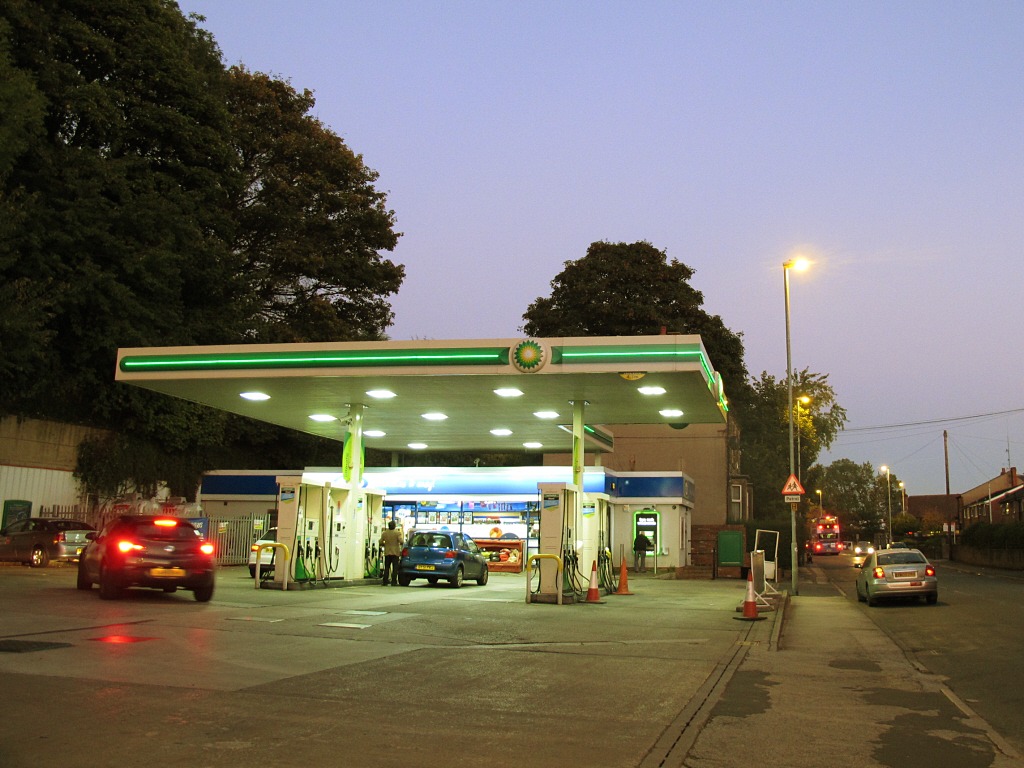
A modern BP filling station in Bramley, Leeds

In January 2010, Carl-Henric Svanberg became chairman of BP board of directors.

On 20 April 2010, the Deepwater Horizon oil spill, a major industrial accident, happened. Consequently, Bob Dudley replaced Tony Hayward as the company's CEO, serving from October 2010 to February 2020. BP announced a divestment program to sell about $38 billion worth of non-core assets to compensate its liabilities related to the accident. In July 2010, BP sold its natural gas activities in Alberta and British Columbia, Canada, to Apache Corporation. It sold its stake in the Petroperijá and Boquerón fields in Venezuela and in the Lan Tay and Lan Do fields, the Nam Con Son pipeline and terminal, and the Phu My 3 power plant in Vietnam to TNK-BP, forecourts and supply businesses in Namibia, Botswana, Zambia, Tanzania and Malawi to Puma Energy, the Wytch Farm onshore oilfield in Dorset and a package of North Sea gas assets to Perenco, natural-gas liquids business in Canada to Plains All American Pipeline LP, natural gas assets in Kansas to Linn Energy, Carson Refinery in Southern California and its ARCO retail network to Tesoro, Sunray and Hemphill gas processing plants in Texas, together with their associated gas gathering system, to Eagle Rock Energy Partners, the Texas City Refinery and associated assets to Marathon Petroleum, the Gulf of Mexico located Marlin, Dorado, King, Horn Mountain, and Holstein fields as also its stake in non-operated Diana Hoover and Ram Powell fields to Plains Exploration & Production, non-operating stake in the Draugen oil field to Norske Shell, and the UK's liquefied petroleum gas distribution business to DCC. In November 2012, the U.S. Government temporarily banned BP from bidding any new federal contracts. The ban was conditionally lifted in March 2014.

In February 2011, BP formed a partnership with Reliance Industries, taking a 30% stake in a new Indian joint-venture for an initial payment of $7.2 billion. In September 2012, BP sold its subsidiary BP Chemicals (Malaysia) Sdn. Bhd., an operator of the Kuantan purified terephthalic acid (PTA) plant in Malaysia, to Reliance Industries for $230 million. In October 2012, BP sold its stake in TNK-BP to Rosneft for $12.3 billion in cash and 18.5% of Rosneft's stock. The deal was completed on 21 March 2013. In 2012, BP acquired an acreage in the Utica Shale but these developments plans were cancelled in 2014.

In 2011–2015, BP cut down its alternative energy business. The company announced its departure from the solar energy market in December 2011 by closing its solar power business, BP Solar. In 2012, BP shut down the BP Biofuels Highlands project which was developed since 2008 to make cellulosic ethanol from emerging energy crops like switchgrass and from biomass. In 2015, BP decided to exit from other lignocellulosic ethanol businesses. It sold its stake in Vivergo to Associated British Foods. BP and DuPont also mothballed their joint biobutanol pilot plant in Saltend.

In June 2014, BP agreed to a deal worth around $20 billion to supply CNOOC with liquefied natural gas. In 2014, Statoil Fuel & Retail sold its aviation fuel business to BP. To ensure the approval of competition authorities, BP agreed to sell the former Statoil aviation fuel businesses in Copenhagen, Stockholm, Gothenburg, and Malmö airports to World Fuel Services in 2015.

In 2016, BP sold its Decatur, Alabama, plant to Indorama Ventures, of Thailand. At the same year, its Norwegian daughter company BP Norge merged with Det Norske Oljeselskap to form Aker BP.

In April 2017, the company reached an agreement to sell its Forties pipeline system in the North Sea to Ineos for $250 million. The sale included terminals at Dalmeny and Kinneil, a site in Aberdeen, and the Forties Unity Platform. In 2017, the company floated its subsidiary BP Midstream Partners LP, a pipeline operator in the United States, at the New York Stock Exchange. In Argentina, BP and Bridas Corporation agreed to merge their interests in Pan American Energy and Axion Energy to form a jointly owned Pan American Energy Group.

In 2017, BP invested $200 million to acquire a 43% stake in the solar energy developer Lightsource Renewable Energy, a company which was renamed Lightsource BP. In March 2017, the company acquired Clean Energy's biomethane business and assets, including its production sites and existing supply contracts. In April 2017, its subsidiary Butamax bought an isobutanol production company Nesika Energy.

In 2018, the company purchased BHP's shale assets in Texas and Louisiana, including Petrohawk Energy, for $10.5 billion, which were integrated with its subsidiary BPX Energy. Also in 2018, BP bought a 16.5% interest in the Clair field in the UK from ConocoPhillips, increasing its share to 45.1%. BP paid £1.3 billion and gave to ConocoPhillips its 39.2% non-operated stake in the Kuparuk River Oil Field and satellite oil fields in Alaska. In December 2018, BP sold its wind assets in Texas.

In 2018, BP acquired Chargemaster, which operated the UK's largest electric vehicle charging network. In 2019, BP and Didi Chuxing formed a joint venture to build out electric vehicle charging infrastructure in China. In September 2020, BP announced it will build out a rapid charging network in London for Uber.

In January 2019, BP discovered 1 billion barrels (160×10^{6} m^{3}) oil at its Thunder Horse location in the Gulf of Mexico. The company also announced plans to spend $1.3 billion on a third phase of its Atlantis field near New Orleans.

=== 2021 to present ===
Helge Lund succeeded Carl-Henric Svanberg on 1 January 2019 as chairman of BP Plc board of directors, and Bernard Looney succeeded Bob Dudley on 5 February 2020 as chief executive. Amidst the COVID-19 pandemic, BP claimed that it would "accelerate the transition to a lower carbon economy and energy system" after announcing that the company had to write down $17.5 billion for the second quarter of 2020.

On 29 June 2020, BP sold its petrochemicals unit to Ineos for $5 billion. The business was focused on aromatics and acetyls. It had interests in 14 plants in Asia, Europe and the U.S., and achieved production of 9.7 million metric tons in 2019. On 30 June 2020, BP sold all its Alaska upstream operations and interests, including interests in Prudhoe Bay Oil Field, to Hilcorp for $5.6 billion. On 14 December 2020, it sold its 49% stake in the Trans-Alaska Pipeline System to Harvest Alaska.

A modern BP gas station in Tokai, Cape Town, South Africa

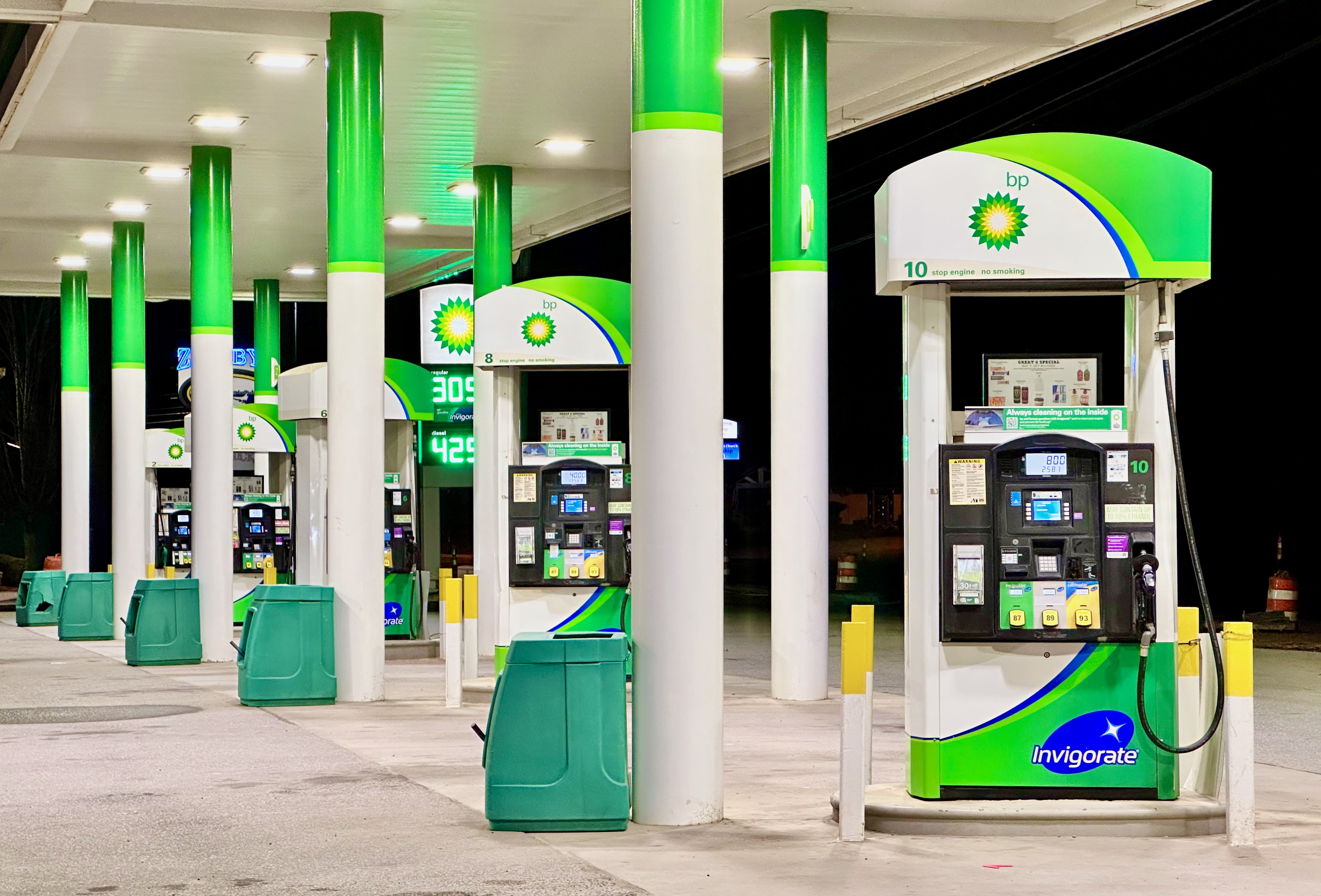
Modern BP gas pumps in North Carolina

In September 2020, BP formed a partnership with Equinor to develop offshore wind and announced it will acquire 50% non-operating stake in the Empire Wind off New York and Beacon Wind off Massachusetts offshore wind farms. The deal is expected to be completed at the first half of 2021. In December 2020, BP acquired a majority stake in Finite Carbon, the largest forest carbon offsets developer in the United States.

In response to the 2022 Russian invasion of Ukraine, BP announced that it would sell its 19.75% stake in Rosneft, although no timeline was announced. At the time of BP's decision, Rosneft's activities accounted for around half of BP's oil and gas reserves and a third of its production. BP's decision came after the British government expressed concern about BP's involvement in Russia. However, BP remained a Rosneft shareholder throughout the whole 2022 year, which caused some criticism from the Ukrainian president's office.

In October 2022, BP announced that it would be acquiring Archaea Energy, a renewable natural gas producer, for $4.1 billion. In November 2022, the company announced a large increase in profit for the period from July to September due to the high fuel prices caused by the Russian invasion of Ukraine.

In February 2023, BP reported record annual profits, on a replacement cost basis, for the year 2022. On that basis, 2022 profits were more than double than in 2021, and they were also the biggest profits in the whole 114-year long history of BP. The same month, BP agreed to acquire truck stop service company TravelCenters of America for $1.3 billion. The purchase was completed in May 2023.

After 10 years of force majeure, BP, Eni and Sonatrach resumed exploration in their blocks in the Ghadames Basin (A-B) and offshore Block C in August 2023, continuing their contract obligations.

BP increased its dividend by 10% year-on-year in early 2024 and accelerated share buybacks. It had already announced $1.75 billion before reporting first quarter results and intended to announce a $3.5 billion share buyback in the first half of the year.

Murray Auchincloss became CEO in January 2024. In June 2024, BP announced the acquisition of Bunge Bioenergia from Bunge Global for US$1.4 billion. The purchase will increase BP's ethanol production to 50,000 barrels per day.

In November 2024, BP and partners announced its plan to invest $7 billion to a carbon capture and gas field development in Indonesia's West Papua Province that has the potential of almost 3 trillion cubic feet of gas resource. Production plans are expected to start in 2028 in the Tangguh gas field.

In January 2025, BP announced that it planned to cut 4,700 staff and 3,000 contractors, more than 5% of its total workforce.

In February 2025, BP declared that it would cut renewable energy investments and focus on increasing oil and gas production. The plans will see an increase in investment in the two fossil fuels of around 20% to $10 billion per year, while decreasing planned funding for renewables by more than £5 billion.

The decision undermines the emissions and fossil fuel reductions targets set out in the Paris Climate Agreement, with Greenpeace UK stating that BP's decision to double-down on fossil fuel production was "proof that fossil fuel companies can't or won't be part of climate crisis solutions". BP's share price fell by 2% in the hours that followed the announcement.

Bloomberg reported in May 2025 that rival Shell plc was considering an acquisition of BP.

In July 2025, the company announced the appointment of Albert Manifold as its next chairman from 1 October 2025, replacing Helge Lund. In August 2025 the company announced its greatest oil and gas field discovery in the last 25 years. The discovery was in the Bumerangue prospect, located about 400 km offshore in Brazil's deepwater Santos Basin.

In December 2025, BP announced the stepping down of Murray Auchincloss and the appointment of Meg O'Neill as its new chief executive effective from April 2026. She will be the first external hire and first female CEO of a major global oil producer. She will also lead the shift in focus back to oil and gas following Murray Auchincloss's resignation. The company also announced that Carol Howle would serve as interim CEO.

In December 2025, the company announced it agreed to sell a 65 per cent stake in Castrol to Stonepeak for around $6 billion. As part of the deal, BP will retain a 35 per cent stake in the company for the next two years, after which it will be free to sell. BP said the proceeds will be used to reduce its debt. The acquisition was completed on 2 November 2026.

On 1 April 2026, O'Neill took up her post. O'Neill joined from Woodside Energy with a mandate to streamline the company's executive structure and accelerate oil and gas production growth.

In May 2026, the company's board unanimously decided to remove Manifold from his post as chairman with immediate effect, due to 'serious' concerns about his conduct, including 'bullying' and 'overbearing' behaviour. Ian Tyler was appointed interim chair, and BP announced that it would begin a search for a permanent chair.

== Logo evolution ==
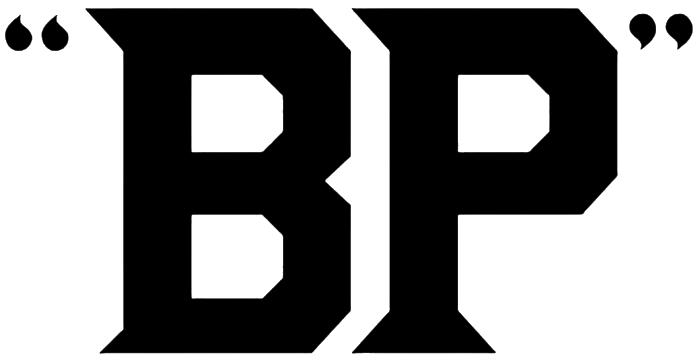
1920–1930

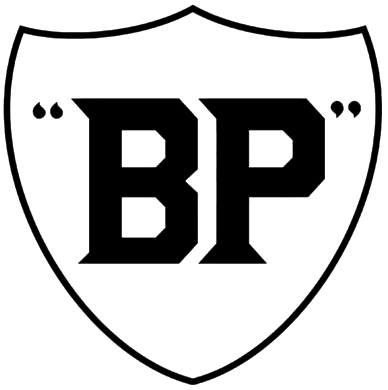
1930–1947

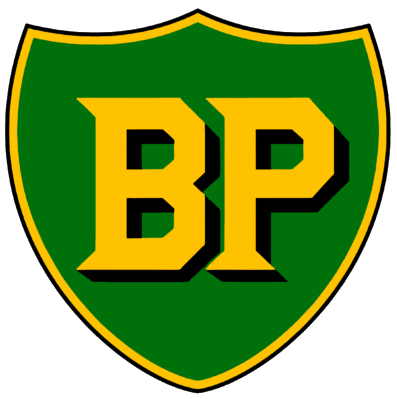
1947–1961

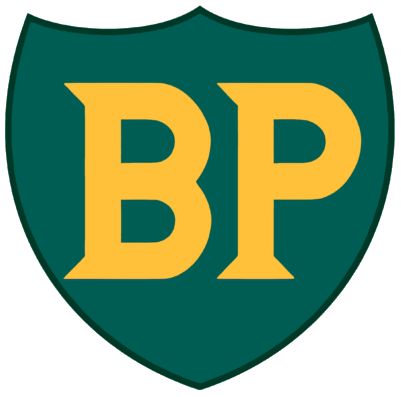
1961–1989

1989–2000

Since 2000

== Operations ==
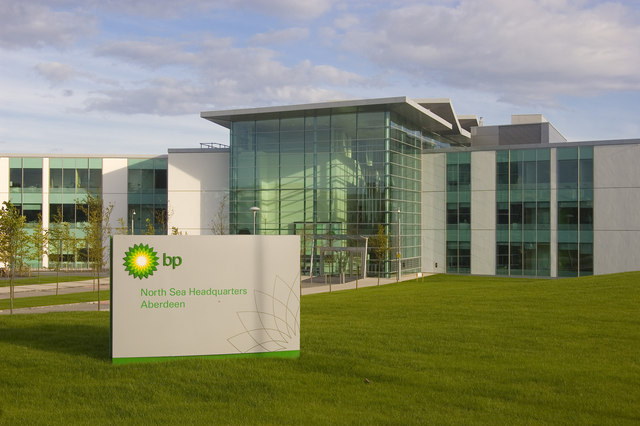
BP North Sea Headquarters in Aberdeen, built by the Bowmer and Kirkland group at a cost of £50 million

As of 31 December 2018, BP had operations in 78 countries worldwide with the global headquarters in London, United Kingdom. BP operations are organized into three business segments, Upstream, Downstream, and renewables.

Since 1951, BP has annually published its Statistical Review of World Energy, which is considered an energy industry benchmark.

=== Operations by location ===
==== United Kingdom ====
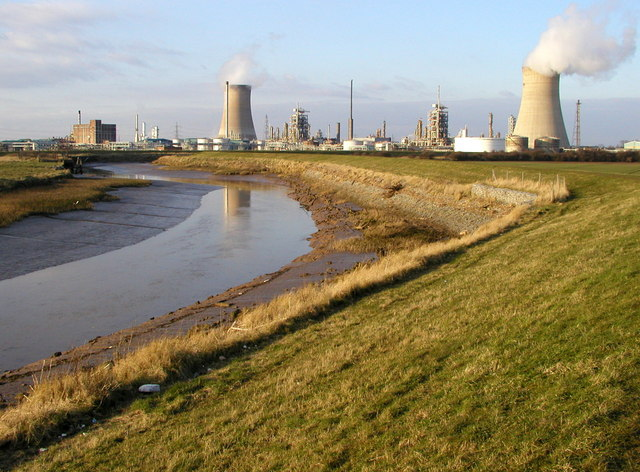
The BP chemicals plant in Saltend near Hull, England

BP has a major corporate campus in Sunbury-on-Thames which is home to around 3,500 employees and over 50 business units. Its North Sea operations are headquartered in Aberdeen, Scotland. BP's trading functions are based at 20 Canada Square in Canary Wharf, London. BP has three major research and development centres in the UK.

As of 2020, and following the sale of its Andrew and Shearwater interests, BP's operations were focussed in the Clair, Quad 204 and ETAP hubs. In 2011, the company announced that it is focusing its investment in the UK North Sea into four development projects including the Clair, Devenick, Schiehallion and Loyal, and Kinnoull oilfields. BP is the operator of the Clair oilfield, which has been appraised as the largest hydrocarbon resource in the UK.

There are 1,200 BP service stations in the UK. Since 2018 BP operates the UK's largest electric vehicle charging network through its subsidiary BP Pulse (formerly Chargemaster).

In February 2020, BP announced a joint venture with EnBW to develop and operate 3 GW of offshore wind capacity in the Crown Estate Leasing Round 4. This is BP's first move into Britain's offshore wind market, however, BP currently provides a range of services to the offshore wind sector in the UK through its subsidiary ONYX InSight who provide a range of predictive maintenance and engineering consultancy services to the sector.

In February 2022, BP announced it acquired a 30% stake in the London-based company, Green Biofuels Ltd, a producer of renewable hydrogenated vegetable oil fuels that can be used as a direct replacement for diesel.

==== United States ====
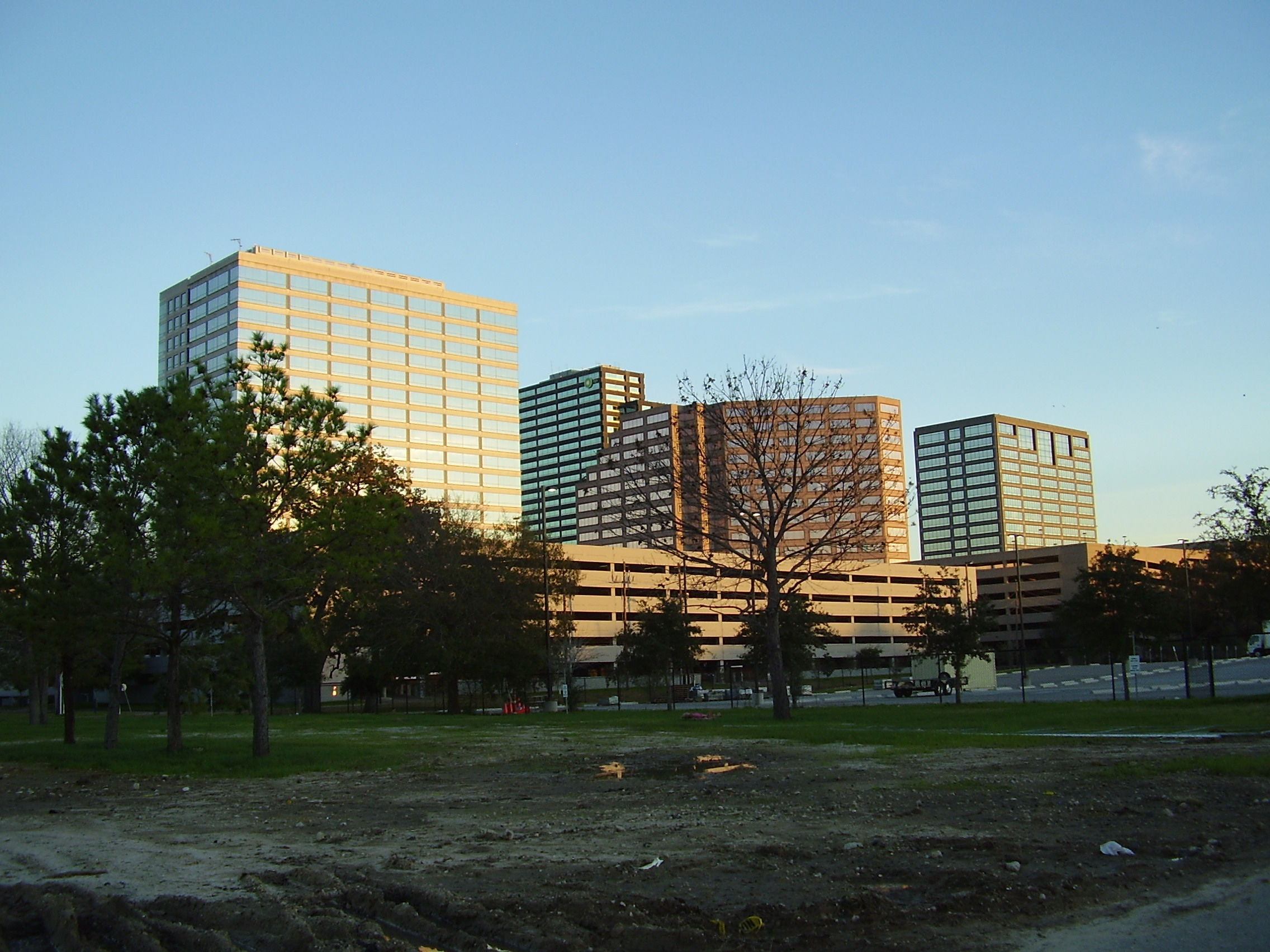
The headquarters of BP America in Westlake Park, Houston

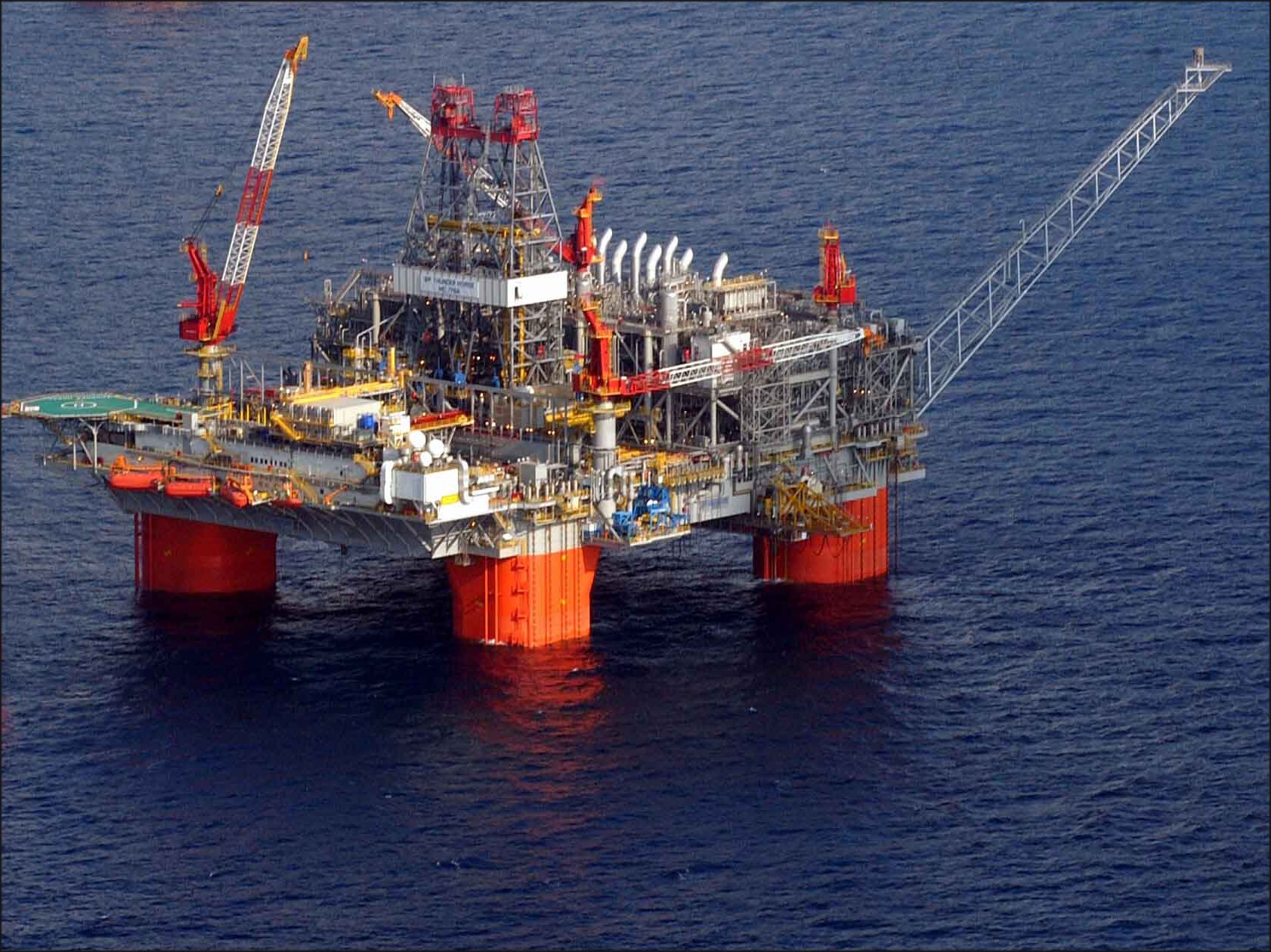
The Thunder Horse PDQ semi-submersible oil platform in the Thunder Horse Oil Field

The United States operations comprise nearly one-third of BP's operations. BP employs approximately 14,000 people in the United States. In 2018, BP's total production in the United States included 385,000 barrels per day (61,200 m^{3}/d) of oil and 1.9 billion cubic feet per day (54 million cubic metres per day) of natural gas, and its refinery throughput was 703,000 barrels per day (111,800 m^{3}/d).

BP's major subsidiary in the United States is BP America, Inc. (formerly: Standard Oil Company (Ohio) and Sohio) based in Houston, Texas. BP Exploration & Production Inc., a 1996 established Houston-based subsidiary, is dealing with oil exploration and production. BP Corporation North America, Inc., provides petroleum refining services as also transportation fuel, heat and light energy. BP Products North America, Inc., a 1954 established Houston-based subsidiary, is engaged in the exploration, development, production, refining, and marketing of oil and natural gas. BP America Production Company, a New Mexico-based subsidiary, engages in oil and gas exploration and development. BP Energy Company, a Houston-based subsidiary, is a provider of natural gas, power, and risk management services to the industrial and utility sectors and a retail electric provider in Texas.

BP's upstream activities in the Lower 48 states are conducted through Denver-based BPX Energy. It has a 7.5 billion barrels (1.19 billion cubic metres) resource base on 5.7 million acres (2,300,000 ha). It has shale positions in the Woodford, Oklahoma, Haynesville, Texas, and Eagle Ford, Texas shales. It has unconventional gas (shale gas or tight gas) stakes also in Colorado, New Mexico and Wyoming, primarily in the San Juan Basin.

As of 2019, BP produced about 300,000 barrels per day (48,000 m^{3}/d) of oil equivalent in the Gulf of Mexico. BP operates the Atlantis, Mad Dog, Na Kika, and Thunder Horse production platforms while holding interest in hubs operated by other companies. In April 2023, BP launched a new oil rig, the Argos, in the Gulf.

BP operates Whiting Refinery in Indiana and Cherry Point Refinery in Washington. It formerly co-owned and operated a refinery in Toledo, Ohio, with Husky Energy, but sold its stake in the refinery in February 2023 to Cenovus Energy.

BP operates nine onshore wind farms in six states, and held an interest in another in Hawaii with a net generating capacity of 1,679 MW. These wind farms include the Cedar Creek 2, Titan 1, Goshen North, Flat Ridge 1 and 2, Mehoopany, Fowler Ridge 1, 2 and 3 and Auwahi wind farms. It is also in process to acquire 50% non-operating stake in the Empire Wind off New York and Beacon Wind off Massachusetts offshore wind farms.

==== Other locations ====
In Egypt, BP produces approximately 15% of the country's total oil production and 40% of its domestic gas. The company also has offshore gas developments in the East Nile Delta Mediterranean, and in the West Nile Delta, where the company has a joint investment of US$9 billion with Wintershall Dea to develop North Alexandria and West Mediterranean concessions offshore gas fields.

BP is active in offshore oil development in Angola, where it holds an interest in a total of nine oil exploration and production blocks covering more than 30,000 square kilometres (12,000 sq mi). This includes four blocks it acquired in December 2011 and an additional block that is operated by Brazilian national oil company, Petrobras, in which it holds a 40% stake.

BP has a stake in exploration of two blocks of offshore deepwater assets in the South China Sea.

In India, BP owns a 30% share of oil and gas assets operated by Reliance Industries, including exploration and production rights in more than 20 offshore oil and gas blocks, representing an investment of more than US$7 billion into oil and gas exploration in the country.

BP has major liquefied natural gas activities in Indonesia, where it operates the Tangguh LNG project, which began production in 2009 and has a capacity of 7.6 million tonnes of liquid natural gas per year. In 2025, BP signed three additional production sharing contracts for the Bintuni, Drawa, and Barong blocks, increasing the company's total participation in Indonesia to 11 oil and gas blocks. Also in that country, the company has invested in the exploration and development of coalbed methane.

BP operates in Iraq as part of the joint venture Rumaila Operating Organization in the Rumaila oil field, the world's fourth largest oilfield, where it produced over 1 million barrels per day (160×10^{3} m^{3}/d) of oil equivalent in 2011. A BBC investigation found in 2022 that waste-gas was being burned as close as 350 meters from people's homes. A leaked report from Ministry of Health (Iraq) blamed air pollution for 20% rise in cancer in Basra between 2015 and 2018. The Iraqi Ministry of Health has banned its employees from speaking about the health damage. Iraqi Environment Minister Jassem al-Falahi later admitted that "pollution from oil production is the main reason for increases in local cancer rates." In February 2025, BP signed a $25 billion deal to redevelop four oil and gas fields in Kirkuk, Iraq.

In Oman, BP currently has a 60% participation interest in Block 61. Block 61 is one of Oman's largest gas blocks with a daily production capacity of 1.5 billion cubic feet of gas and more than 65,000 barrels of condensate. It covers around 3,950 km in central Oman and contains the largest tight gas development in the Middle East. On 1 February 2021, BP inked a deal to sell 20% participating interest in Block 61 to Thailand's PTT Exploration and Production Public Company Ltd. (PTTEP) for a total of $2.6 billion. Upon closure of the sale, the BP will remain the block's operator with a 40% interest.

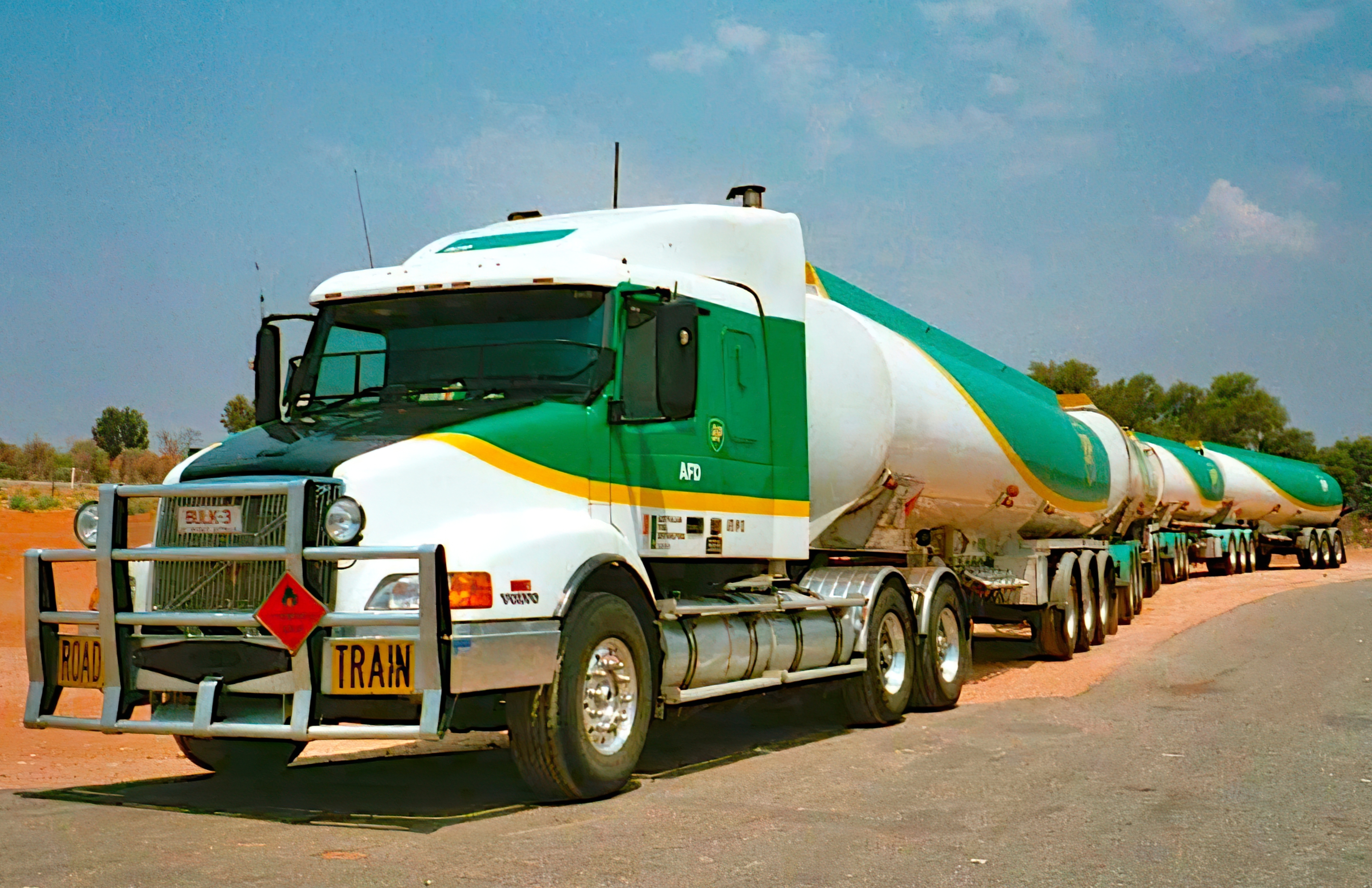
A BP road train in the Australian outback

Prior to March 2021, BP operated the Kwinana refinery in Western Australia, which was the country's largest refinery, supplying about 70% of Western Australia's fuel needs. The former refinery, located on Cockburn Sound, was converted to an import terminal and, as of 2025, was transitioning into a biorefinery and green hydrogen production facility. But in 2025 BP announced it was ending its role in producing hydrogen in the region.

BP is a non-operating joint venture partner in the North West Shelf, which produces LNG, pipeline gas, condensate and oil. The NWS venture is Australia's largest resource development and accounts for around one third of Australia's oil and gas production.

BP operates the two largest oil and gas production projects in the Azerbaijan's sector of the Caspian Sea, the Azeri–Chirag–Guneshli offshore oil fields, which supplies 80% of the country's oil production, and the Shah Deniz gas field. It also and develops the Shafag-Asiman complex of offshore geological structures. In addition, it operates the Sangachal terminal and the Azerbaijan's major export pipelines through Georgia such as Baku–Tbilisi–Ceyhan, Baku–Supsa and South Caucasus pipelines.

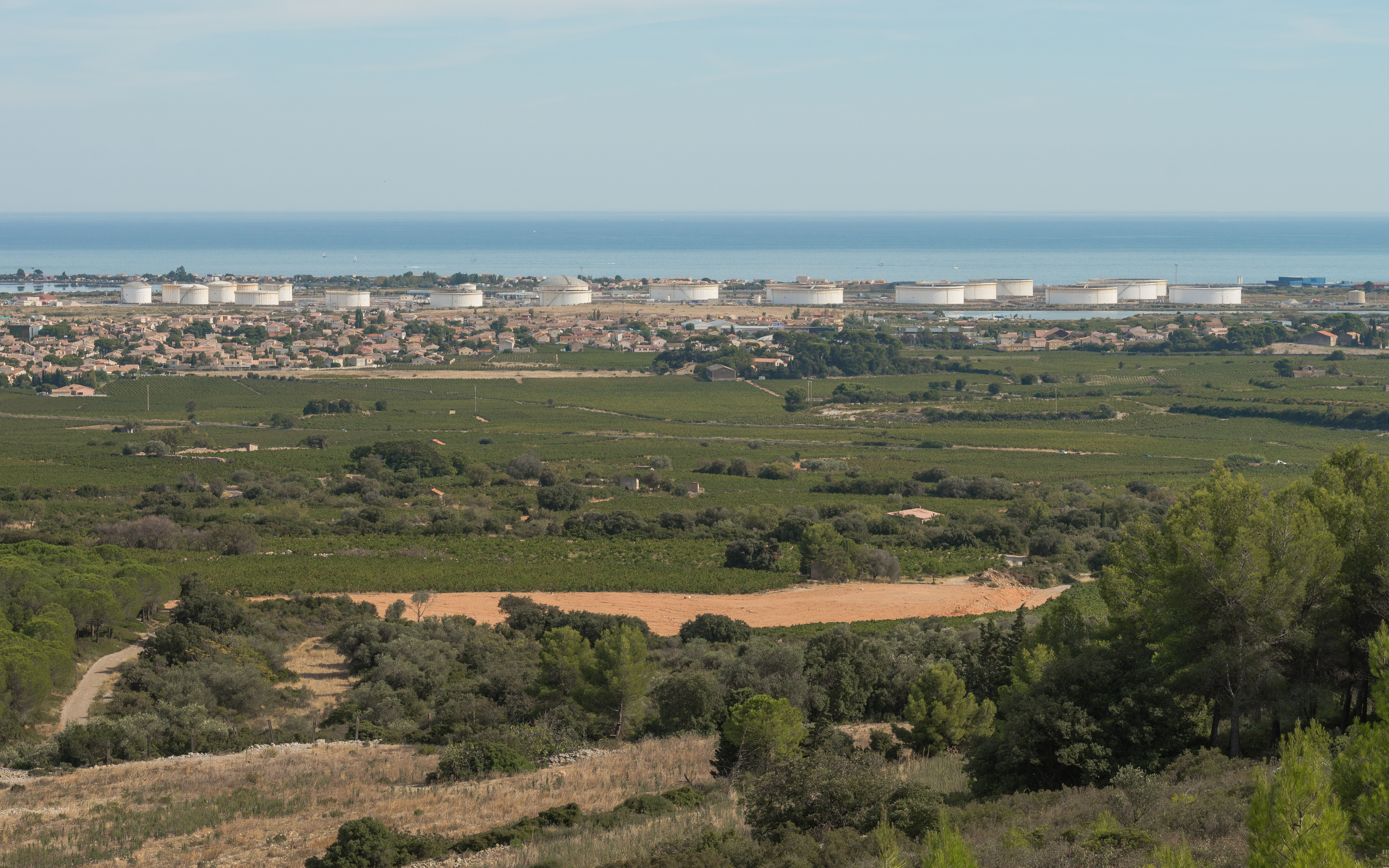
A GDH (subsidiary of BP) oil depot, Frontigan, Hérault, France

BP's refining operations in continental Europe include Europe's second-largest oil refinery, located in Rotterdam, the Netherlands, which can process up to 377,000 barrels (59,900 m^{3}) of crude oil per day. Other facilities are located in Ingolstadt, Gelsenkirchen and Lingen, in Germany, as well as one in Castellón, Spain.

In addition to its offshore operations in the British zone of North Sea, BP has interests in the Norwegian section of the sea through its stake in Aker BP. As of December 2018, BP holds a 19.75% stake in Russia's state-controlled oil company Rosneft.

Retail operations of motor vehicle fuels in Europe are present in the United Kingdom, France, Germany (through the Aral brand), the Netherlands, Switzerland, Italy, Austria, Poland, Portugal, Greece and Turkey.

BP's Canadian operations are headquartered in Calgary and the company operates primarily in Newfoundland. It purchases crude oil for the company's refineries in the United States, and has a 35 per cent stake in the undeveloped Bay du Nord project and three offshore exploration block in Newfoundland.

BP is the largest oil and gas producer in Trinidad and Tobago, where it holds more than 1,350 square kilometres (520 sq mi) of offshore assets and is the largest shareholder in Atlantic LNG, one of the largest LNG plants in Western Hemisphere.

In Brazil, BP holds stakes in offshore oil and gas exploration in the Barreirinhas, Ceará and Campos basins, in addition to onshore processing facilities. BP also operates biofuel production facilities in Brazil, including three cane sugar mills for ethanol production.

BP operated in Singapore until 2004 when it sold its retail network of 28 stations and LPG business to Singapore Petroleum Company (SPC). It also sold its 50% in SPC.

BP has a significant presence in South Africa, operating refineries and 500 gas stations across the country.

=== Exploration and production ===
BP Upstream's activities include exploring for new oil and natural gas resources, developing access to such resources, and producing, transporting, storing and processing oil and natural gas. The activities in this area of operations take place in 25 countries worldwide. In 2018, BP produced around 3.7 million barrels per day (590×10^{3} m^{3}/d) of oil equivalent, of which 2.191 million barrels per day (348.3×10^{3} m^{3}/d) were liquids and 8.659 billion cubic feet per day (245.2 million cubic metres per day) was natural gas, and had total proved reserves of 19,945 million barrels (3,171.0×10^{6} m^{3}) of oil equivalent, of which liquids accounted 11,456 million barrels (1,821.4×10^{6} m^{3}) barrels and natural gas 49.239 trillion cubic feet (1.3943 trillion cubic metres). In addition to the conventional oil exploration and production, BP has a stake in the three oil sands projects in Canada.

BP had plans to drop its oil and gas production to fall by at least one million barrels a day by 2030, a 40% reduction on 2019 levels, but this was scrapped in October 2024, with plans for an increase in production instead.

=== Refining and marketing ===
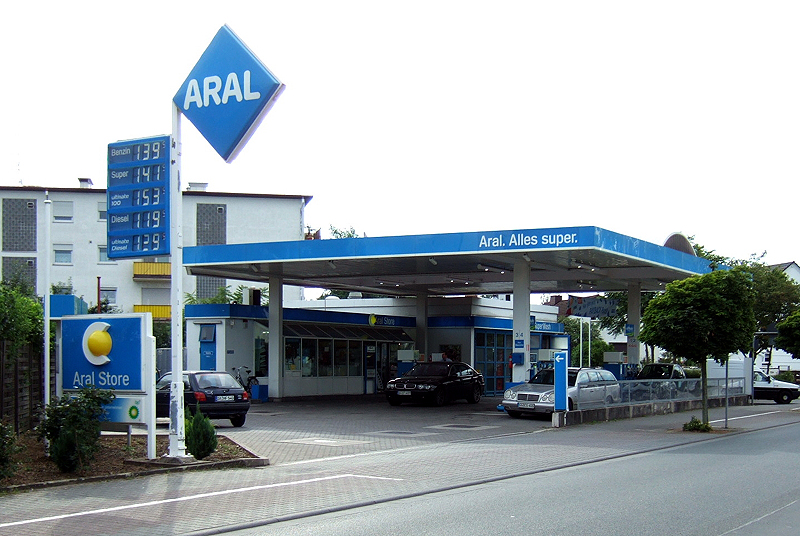
An Aral service station in Weiterstadt, Germany

BP downstream's activities include the refining, marketing, manufacturing, transportation, trading and supply of crude oil and petroleum products. Downstream is responsible for BP's fuels and lubricants businesses, and has major operations located in Europe, North America and Asia. As of 2018, BP owned or had a share in 11 refineries.

BP, which employs about 1,800 people in oil trading and trades over 5 million barrels per day (790×10^{3} m^{3}/d) of oil and refined products, is the world's third-biggest oil trader after Royal Dutch Shell and Vitol. The operation is estimated to be able to generate over $1 billion trading profits in a good year.

Air BP is the aviation division of BP, providing aviation fuel, lubricants & services. It has operations in over 50 countries worldwide. BP Shipping provides the logistics to move BP's oil and gas cargoes to market, as well as marine structural assurance. It manages a large fleet of vessels most of which are held on long-term operating leases. BP Shipping's chartering teams based in London, Singapore, and Chicago also charter third party vessels on both time charter and voyage charter basis. The BP-managed fleet consists of Very Large Crude Carriers (VLCCs), one North Sea shuttle tanker, medium size crude and product carriers, liquefied natural gas (LNG) carriers, liquefied petroleum gas (LPG) carriers, and coasters. All of these ships are double-hulled.

BP has around 18,700 service stations worldwide. Its flagship retail brand is BP Connect, a chain of service stations combined with a convenience store, although in the US it is gradually being transitioned to the ampm format. BP also owns half of Kentucky-based convenience store company Thorntons LLC with ArcLight Capital Partners (who own the Gulf brand in the United States) since 2019. On 13 July 2021, BP announced it will take acquire ArcLight Capital Partners' share of Thorntons, and thus fully own the convenience store company. The deal is expected to close later in the year. In Germany and Luxembourg, BP operates service stations under the Aral brand. On the US West Coast, in the states of California, Oregon, Washington, Nevada, Idaho, Arizona, and Utah, BP primarily operates service stations under the ARCO brand. In Australia BP operates a number of BP Travel Centres, large-scale destination sites located which, in addition to the usual facilities in a BP Connect site, also feature food-retail tenants such as McDonald's, KFC and Nando's and facilities for long-haul truck drivers.

Castrol is BP's main brand for industrial and automotive lubricants and is applied to a large range of BP oils, greases and similar products for most lubrication applications.

=== Clean energy ===
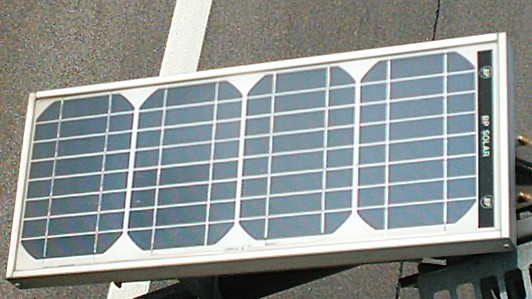
A BP photovoltaic (PV) module that is composed of multiple PV cells. Two or more interconnected PV modules create an array.

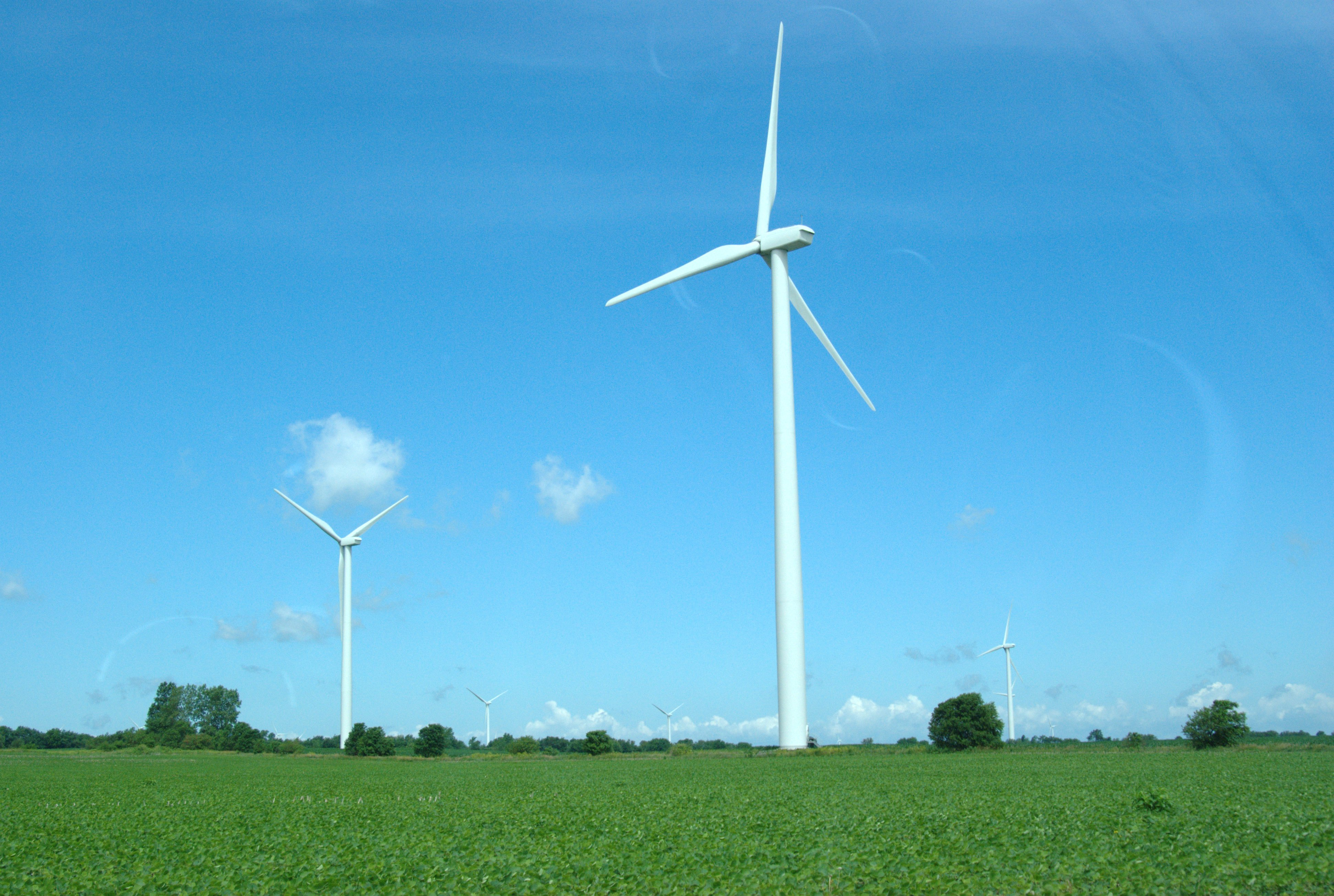
The Fowler Ridge Wind Farm

BP's public rhetoric and pledges emphasise that the company is shifting towards climate-friendly, low-carbon and transition strategies. However, a 2022 study found that the company's spending on clean energy was insignificant and opaque, with little to suggest that the company's discourse matched its actions.

BP was the first of supermajors to say that it would focus on energy sources other than fossil fuels. It established an alternative and low carbon energy business in 2005. According to the company, it spent a total of $8.3 billion in renewable energy projects including solar, wind, and biofuels, and non-renewable projects including natural gas and hydrogen power, through completion in 2013. The relatively small size of BP's alternative energy operations has led to allegations of greenwashing by Greenpeace, Mother Jones, and energy analyst and activist Antonia Juhasz, among others. In 2018, the CEO Bob Dudley said that out of the company's total spending of $15 to $17 billion per year, about $500 million will be invested in low-carbon energy and technology. In August 2020, BP promised to increase its annual low carbon investments to $5 billion by 2030. The company announced plans to transform into an integrated energy company, with a renewed focus on investing away from oil and into low-carbon technologies. It has set targets to have a renewables portfolio of 20 GW by 2025, and 50 GW by 2030.

BP operates nine wind farms in seven states of the U.S., and held an interest in another in Hawaii with a net generating capacity of 1,679 MW. It is also in process to acquire 50% non-operating stake in the Empire Wind off New York and Beacon Wind off Massachusetts offshore wind farms. BP and Tesla, Inc. are cooperating for testing the energy storage by battery at the Titan 1 wind farm. BP Launchpad has also invested in ONYX InSight, one of the leading providers of predictive analytic solutions serving the wind industry.

In Brazil, BP owns two ethanol producers—Companhia Nacional de Açúcar e Álcool andTropical BioEnergia—with three ethanol mills. These mills produce around 800,000 cubic metres per annum (5,000,000 bbl/a) of ethanol equivalent. BP has invested in an agricultural biotechnology company Chromatin, a company developing crops that can grow on marginal land and that are optimized to be used as feedstock for biofuel. Its joint venture with DuPont called Butamax, which has developed the patented bio-butanol-producing technology, and owns an isobutanol plant in Scandia, Kansas, United States. In addition BP owns biomethane production facilities in Canton, Michigan, and North Shelby, Tennessee, as well as share of facilities under construction in Oklahoma City and Atlanta. BP's subsidiary Air BP supplies aviation biofuel at Oslo, Halmstad, and Bergen airports.

BP owns a 43% stake in Lightsource BP, a company which focuses on the managing and maintaining solar farms. As of 2017, Lightsource has commissioned 1.3 GW of solar capacity and manages about 2 GW of solar capacity. It plans to increase the capacity up to 8 GW through projects in the United States, India, Europe and the Middle East. BP has invested $20 million in Israeli quick-charging battery firm StoreDot Ltd. It operates electric vehicle charging networks in the UK under its subsidiary BP Chargemaster, and in China via a joint venture with Didi Chuxing.

In partnership with Ørsted A/S, BP plans a 50 MV electrolyser at the Lingen refinery to produce hydrogen using North Sea wind power. Production is expected to begin in 2024.

BP is a majority shareholder in carbon offset developer Finite Carbon, and acquired 9 GW of US solar projects in 2021.

In 2023, following the announcement of record profits, the company scaled back their emissions targets. Originally, the company promised a 35-40% cut of emissions by the end of the decade. On 7 February, BP revised the target to a 20-30% cut in emissions, stating that it needed to keep up with the current demands for oil and gas.

== Corporate affairs ==
Big Oil companies (2021) (Note: Data is based on the 2022 Fortune 500.)
Company	Revenue (USD bn)	Profit (USD bn)	Brands
ExxonMobil	286	23	Mobil; Esso; Imperial Oil
Shell plc	273	20	Jiffy Lube; Pennzoil
TotalEnergies	185	16	Elf Aquitaine; SunPower
BP	164	7.6	Amoco; Aral AG
Chevron	163	16	Texaco; Caltex; Havoline
Marathon	141	10	ARCO
Phillips 66	115	1.3	76; Conoco; JET
Valero	108	0.9	—N/a
Eni	77	5.8	—N/a
ConocoPhillips	48.3	8.1	—N/a

=== Business trends ===
The key trends of BP are (as at the financial year ending December 31):

Year	Revenue (USD bn)	Net income (USD bn)	Employees (k)
2017	240	3.4	74.7
2018	298	9.4	75.0
2019	278	4.0	70.1
2020	180	–20.3	63.6
2021	164	7.6	64.0
2022	248	–2.5	66.3
2023	213	15.2	87.8
2024	189	1.2	100.5
2025	189	1.3	N/A

=== Management ===
As of May 2026, the following individuals serve on the board:

- Ian Tyler (chairman, interim)
- Meg O'Neill (chief executive officer)
- Kate Thomson (chief financial officer)
- Dame Amanda Blanc (senior independent director)
- Dave Hager (independent non-executive director)
- Tushar Morzaria (independent non-executive director)
- Hina Nagarajan (independent non-executive director)
- Satish Pai (independent non-executive director)
- Johannes Teyssen (independent non-executive director)
- Ben Mathews (company secretary)

=== Past chairmen ===
Past chairmen have included:

- The Lord Strathalmond, 1954–1956
- Basil Jackson, 1956–1957
- Sir Neville Gass, 1957–1960
- Sir Maurice Bridgeman, 1960–1969
- Sir Eric Drake, 1969–1975
- Sir David Steel, 1975–1981
- Sir Peter Walters, 1981–1990
- Sir Robert Horton, 1990–1992
- The Lord Ashburton, 1992–1995
- The Lord Simon of Highbury, 1995–1997
- Peter Sutherland, 1997–2009
- Carl-Henric Svanberg, 2010–2018
- Helge Lund, 2019–2025
- Albert Manifold, 2025–2026
- Ian Tyler, 2026– (interim)

=== Stock ===
The company's shares are primarily traded on the London Stock Exchange, but also listed on the Frankfurt Stock Exchange in Germany. In the United States shares are traded in US$ on the New York Stock Exchange in the form of American depository shares (ADS). One ADS represents six ordinary shares.

Following the United States Federal Trade Commission's approval of the BP-Amoco merger in 1998, Amoco's stock was removed from the S&P 500 and was merged with BP shares on the London Stock Exchange.

=== Branding and public relations ===
In the first quarter of 2001 the company adopted the marketing name of BP, and replaced its "Green Shield" logo with the "Helios" symbol, a green and yellow sunflower logo named after the Greek sun god and designed to represent energy in its many forms. BP introduced a new corporate slogan – "Beyond Petroleum" along with a $200M advertising and marketing campaign. According to the company, the new slogan represented their focus on meeting the growing demand for fossil fuels, manufacturing and delivering more advanced products, and to enable transitioning to a lower carbon footprint.

By 2008, BP's branding campaign had succeeded with the culmination of a 2007 Effie Award from the American Marketing Association, and consumers had the impression that BP was one of the greenest petroleum companies in the world. BP was criticised by environmentalists and marketing experts, who stated that the company's alternative energy activities were only a fraction of the company's business at the time. According to Democracy Now, BP's marketing campaign amounted to a deceptive greenwashing public-relations spin campaign given that BP's 2008 budget included more than $20 billion for fossil fuel investment and less than $1.5 billion for all alternative forms of energy. Oil and energy analyst Antonia Juhasz notes BP's investment in green technologies peaked at 4% of its exploratory budget prior to cutbacks, including the discontinuation of BP Solar and the closure of its alternative energy headquarters in London. According to Juhasz, "four percent...hardly qualifies the company to be Beyond Petroleum", citing BP's "aggressive modes of production, whether it's the tar sands [or] offshore".

BP attained a negative public image from the series of industrial accidents that occurred through the 2000s, and its public image was severely damaged after the Deepwater Horizon explosion and Gulf Oil spill. In the immediate aftermath of the spill, BP initially downplayed the severity of the incident, and made many of the same PR errors that Exxon had made after the Exxon Valdez disaster. CEO Tony Hayward was criticised for his statements and had committed several gaffes, including stating that he "wanted his life back." Some in the media commended BP for some of its social media efforts, such as the use of Twitter and Facebook as well as a section of the company's website where it communicated its efforts to clean up the spill.

In February 2012 BP North America launched a $500 million branding campaign to rebuild its brand.

The company's advertising budget was about $5 million per week during the four-month spill in the Gulf of Mexico, totalling nearly $100 million.

In May 2012, BP tasked a press office staff member to openly join discussions on the Wikipedia article's talk page and suggest content to be posted by other editors. Controversy emerged in 2013 over the amount of content from BP that had entered this article. Wikipedia co-founder Jimmy Wales stated that, by identifying himself as a BP staff member, the contributor in question had complied with site policy regarding conflicts of interest.

=== Integrity and compliance ===
Investigative journalism by BBC Panorama and Africa Eye aired in June 2019 criticising BP for the way in which it had obtained the development rights of Cayar Offshore Profond and St. Louis Offshore Profond blocks, off the coast of Senegal in 2017. In 2012, a Frank Timiș company, Petro-Tim, though previously unknown to the oil industry, was awarded a license to explore the blocks despite having no known record in the industry. Soon after, Aliou Sall, brother of Senegal's president, Macky Sall, was hired at the company, implying a conflict of interest, causing public outrage in Senegal. The 2019 program by BBC Panorama and Africa Eye accuses BP of a failure in due diligence when it agreed on a deal with Timis Corporation in 2017. The deal by BP is expected to provide substantial royalties to Frank Timiș despite accusations of initially obtaining the exploration rights through corruption. Kosmos Energy was also implicated. BP refutes any implications of improper conduct. Regarding the acquisition of Timis Corporation interests in Senegal in April 2017, BP states that it "paid what it considered a fair market value for the interests at this stage of exploration/development". However, BP has not made public what was the basis of the valuation, and states that "the details of the deal are confidential". BP argues that "the amount which would be paid separately by BP to Timis Corporation would be less than one percent of what the Republic of Senegal would receive". Senegal's justice ministry has called an inquiry into the energy contracts.

=== LGBTQ recognition ===
In 2014, BP backed a global study researching challenges for lesbian, gay, bisexual and transgender employees and for ways that companies can be a "force for change" for LGBT workers around the world. In 2015, Reuters wrote that BP is "known for their more liberal policies for gay and transgender workers". A 2016 article in the Houston Chronicle said BP was "among the first major companies in the United States to offer LGBT workers equal protection and benefits roughly 20 years ago". BP scored a 100% on the 2018 Human Rights Campaign's Corporate Equality Index, which was released in 2017, although this was the most common score. Also in 2017, BP added gender reassignment surgery to its list of benefits for U.S. employees. According to the Human Rights Campaign, BP is one of only a few oil and gas companies offering transgender benefits to its employees. BP ranked No. 51 on the list of Top 100 employers for lesbian, gay, bisexual and transgender staff on the 2017 Stonewall Workplace Equality Index. Also in 2017, John Mingé, chairman and president of BP America, signed a letter alongside other Houston oil executives denouncing the proposed "bathroom bill" in Texas. Bobbi Pickard has praised the company's LGBTQ inclusivity, stating that coming out as transgender while working with company in 2017 "saved her life".

== Environmental record ==
=== Climate policy ===
Prior to 1997, BP was a member of the Global Climate Coalition, an industry organisation established to promote global warming scepticism, but withdrew in 1997, saying "the time to consider the policy dimensions of climate change is not when the link between greenhouse gases and climate change is conclusively proven, but when the possibility cannot be discounted and is taken seriously by the society of which we are part. We in BP have reached that point.". BP was distinguished as the first multinational outside of the reinsurance industry to publicly support the scientific consensus on climate change, which Pew Center on Global Climate Change president Eileen Claussen then described as a transformative moment on the issue. In March 2002, Lord John Browne, the group chief executive of BP that time, declared in a speech that global warming was real and that urgent action was needed. Notwithstanding this, from 1988 to 2015 BP was responsible for 1.53% of global industrial greenhouse gas emissions. In 2015, BP was listed by the UK-based non-profit organisation Influence Map as the fiercest opponent of action on climate change in Europe. In 2018, BP was the largest contributor to the campaign opposing carbon fee initiative 1631 in Washington State. Robert Allendorfer, manager of BP's Cherry Point refinery, wrote the following in a letter to state lawmakers: "[Initiative 1631] would exempt six of the ten largest stationary source emitters in the state, including a coal-fired power plant, an aluminum smelter, and a number of pulp and paper plants." According to a 2019 Guardian ranking, BP was the 6th largest emitter of greenhouse gases in the world.

In February 2020, BP set a goal to cut its greenhouse gas emissions to net-zero by 2050. BP is seeking net-zero carbon emissions across its operations and the fuels the company sells, including emissions from cars, homes, and factories. Details on the scope of this and how this will be achieved are publicly limited. BP said that it is restructuring its operations into four business groups to meet these goals: production and operations; customers and products; gas and low carbon; and innovation and engineering. The company discontinued involvement with American Fuel and Petrochemical Manufacturers, Western States Petroleum Association, and Western Energy Alliance, involved in lobbying government within the United States, because of differences of position on the issue of methane and carbon policies, as a development of this new commitment. However, an investigation conducted by Unearthed, an investigations unit of Greenpeace UK, and HuffPost unveiled eight anti-climate trade associations BP failed to disclose, including Alliance of Western Energy Consumers, Texas Oil and Gas Association, Australian Petroleum Production and Exploration Association, and the Business Council of Australia, among others.

In August 2020, BP America's chairman David Lawler criticised elimination of federal requirements to install equipment to detect and fix methane leaks by saying that "direct federal regulation of methane emissions is essential to preventing leaks throughout the industry and protecting the environment." BP is also a founding member of Methane Guiding Principles, an industry consortium that aims to drive methane reductions throughout the global energy supply chain.

In BP's Energy Outlook 2020, BP stated that the changing energy landscape coupled with the economic toll of the COVID-19 pandemic means that the global crude demand will never again surpass 2019's average. All three scenarios in the outlook see the consumption of coal, oil, and natural gas dropping while the role of renewable energy will soar. BP was also attempting to move from being an international oil company into becoming an integrated energy company that would focus on low-carbon technologies while also setting a target to reduce its overall oil and gas production by 40% by 2030. This plan was scrapped in October 2024, with BP looking to increase its oil and gas production instead.

In 2021, BP was ranked as the 5th most environmentally responsible company out of 120 oil, gas, and mining companies involved in resource extraction north of the Arctic Circle in the Arctic Environmental Responsibility Index (AERI).

In December 2022, U.S. House Oversight and Reform Committee Chair Carolyn Maloney and U.S. House Oversight Environment Subcommittee Chair Ro Khanna sent a memorandum to all House Oversight and Reform Committee members summarizing additional findings from the Committee's investigation into the fossil fuel industry disinformation campaign to obscure the role of fossil fuels in causing global warming, and that upon reviewing internal company documents, accused BP along with ExxonMobil, Chevron, and Shell of greenwashing their Paris Agreement carbon neutrality pledges while continuing long-term investment in fossil fuel production and sales, for engaging in a campaign to promote the use of natural gas as a clean energy source and bridge fuel to renewable energy, and of intimidating journalists reporting about the companies' climate actions and of obstructing the Committee's investigation.

After initially pledging to reduce its emissions by 35% by 2030, BP stated in 2023 that it would aim for a 20-30% reduction instead. Following pressure to boost profits from a group of shareholders including Elliott Management, in February 2025 the company announced plans to significantly reduce its investment in renewable energy, whilst increasing that in oil and gas production by 20%. Some other shareholders raised concerns over the enhanced focus on fossil fuels, which was also criticised by various environmental groups.

=== Indigenous rights ===
In a 2016 study, conducted by Indra Øverland of Norwegian Institute of International Affairs BP was ranked 15th out of 18 levels (in total 37th out of 92 oil, gas and mining companies) on indigenous rights and resource extraction in the Arctic. The ranking of companies took into account 20 criteria, such as the companies' commitments to international standards, the presence of organisational units dedicated to handling indigenous rights, competent staffing, track records on indigenous issues, transparency, and procedures for consulting with indigenous peoples, but the actual performance of companies on indigenous rights was not assessed.

=== Hazardous substance dumping 1993–1995 ===
In September 1999, one of BP's US subsidiaries, BP Exploration Alaska (BPXA), pleaded guilty to criminal charges stemming from its illegally dumping of hazardous wastes on the Alaska North Slope, paying fines and penalties totalling $22 million. BP paid the maximum $500,000 in criminal fines, $6.5 million in civil penalties, and established a $15 million environmental management system at all of BP facilities in the US and Gulf of Mexico that are engaged in oil exploration, drilling or production. The charges stemmed from the 1993 to 1995 dumping of hazardous wastes on Endicott Island, Alaska by BP's contractor Doyon Drilling. The firm illegally discharged waste oil, paint thinner and other toxic and hazardous substances by injecting them down the outer rim, or annuli, of the oil wells. BPXA failed to report the illegal injections when it learned of the conduct, in violation of the Comprehensive Environmental Response, Compensation and Liability Act.

=== Air pollution violations ===
In 2000, BP Amoco acquired ARCO, a Los Angeles-based oil group. In 2003, California's South Coast Air Quality Management District (AQMD) filed a complaint against BP/ARCO, seeking $319 million in penalties for thousands of air pollution violations over an 8-year period. In January 2005, the agency filed a second suit against BP based on violations between August 2002 and October 2004. The suit alleged that BP illegally released air pollutants by failing to adequately inspect, maintain, repair and properly operate thousands of pieces of equipment across the refinery as required by AQMD regulations. It was alleged that in some cases the violations were due to negligence, while in others the violations were knowingly and willfully committed by refinery officials. In 2005, a settlement was reached under which BP agreed to pay $25 million in cash penalties and $6 million in past emissions fees, while spending $20 million on environmental improvements at the refinery and $30 million on community programs focused on asthma diagnosis and treatment.

In 2013, a total of 474 Galveston County residents living near the BP Texas City Refinery filed a $1 billion lawsuit against BP, accusing the company of "intentionally misleading the public about the seriousness" of a two-week release of toxic fumes which began on 10 November 2011. "BP reportedly released Sulfur Dioxide, Methyl Carpaptan, Dimethyl Disulfide and other toxic chemicals into the atmosphere" reads the report. The lawsuit further claims Galveston county has the worst air quality in the United States due to BP's violations of air pollution laws. BP had no comment and said it would address the suit in the court system.

=== Colombian farmland damages claim ===
In 2006, a group of Colombian farmers reached a multimillion-dollar out-of-court settlement with BP for alleged environmental damage caused by the Ocensa pipeline. The company was accused of benefiting from a regime of terror carried out by Colombian government paramilitaries to protect the 450-mile (720 km) Ocensa pipeline; BP said throughout that it has acted responsibly and that landowners were fairly compensated.

In 2009, another group of 95 Colombian farmers filed a suit against BP, saying the company's Ocensa pipeline caused landslides and damage to soil and groundwater, affecting crops, livestock, and contaminating water supplies, making fish ponds unsustainable. Most of the land traversed by the pipeline was owned by peasant farmers who were illiterate and unable to read the environmental impact assessment conducted by BP prior to construction, which acknowledged significant and widespread risks of damage to the land. The Supreme Court of Justice of Colombia handed down a judgement rejecting the case in August 2016.

=== Canadian oil sands ===
Since 2007, BP has been involved in oil sands projects, which Greenpeace has called a climate crime. Members of Canada's First Nations have criticised BP's involvement for the impacts oil sands extraction has on the environment. In 2010, BP pledged to use only in-situ technologies instead of open-pit mining. It uses steam-assisted gravity drainage in-situ technology to extract bitumen. According to Greenpeace it is even more damaging to climate because while according to the Pembina Institute in-situ techniques result in lower nitrogen oxide emissions, and are less damaging to the landscape and rivers, they cause more greenhouse gas and sulphur dioxide emissions than mining. In 2010, activist shareholders asked BP for a full investigation of the Sunrise oil sands project, but were defeated. In 2013, shareholders criticised the project for being carbon-intensive.

== Violations and accidents ==
Citing conditions similar to those that resulted in the 2005 Texas City refinery explosion, on 25 April 2006, the U.S. Department of Labor's Occupational Safety and Health Administration (OSHA) fined BP more than $2.4 million for unsafe operations at the company's Oregon, Ohio refinery. An OSHA inspection resulted in 32 per-instance wilful citations including locating people in vulnerable buildings among the processing units, failing to correct depressurisation deficiencies and deficiencies with gas monitors, and failing to prevent the use of non-approved electrical equipment in locations in which hazardous concentrations of flammable gases or vapours may exist. BP was further fined for neglecting to develop shutdown procedures and designate responsibilities and to establish a system to promptly address and resolve recommendations made after an incident when a large feed pump failed three years prior to 2006. Penalties were also issued for five serious violations, including failure to develop operating procedures for a unit that removes sulphur compound; failure to ensure that operating procedures reflect current operating practice in the Isocracker Unit; failure to resolve process hazard analysis recommendations; failure to resolve process safety management compliance audit items in a timely manner; and failure to periodically inspect pressure piping systems.

In 2008, BP and several other major oil refiners agreed to pay $422 million to settle a class-action lawsuit stemming from water contamination tied to the gasoline additive MTBE, a chemical that was once a key gasoline ingredient. Leaked from storage tanks, MTBE has been found in several water systems across the United States. The plaintiffs maintain that the industry knew about the environmental dangers but that they used it instead of other possible alternatives because it was less expensive. The companies will also be required to pay 70% of cleanup costs for any wells newly affected at any time over the next 30 years.

BP has one of the worst safety records of any major oil company that operates in the United States. Between 2007 and 2010, BP refineries in Ohio and Texas accounted for 97% of "egregious, willful" violations handed out by the U.S. Occupational Safety and Health Administration (OSHA). BP had 760 "egregious, willful" violations during that period, while Sunoco and Conoco-Phillips each had eight, Citgo two and Exxon had one. The deputy assistant secretary of labour at OSHA, said "The only thing you can conclude is that BP has a serious, systemic safety problem in their company."

A report in ProPublica, published in The Washington Post in 2010, found that over a decade of internal investigations of BP's Alaska operations during the 2000s warned senior BP managers that the company repeatedly disregarded safety and environmental rules and risked a serious accident if it did not change its ways. ProPublica found that "Taken together, these documents portray a company that systemically ignored its own safety policies across its North American operations – from Alaska to the Gulf of Mexico to California and Texas. Executives were not held accountable for the failures, and some were promoted despite them."

The Project On Government Oversight, an independent non-profit organisation in the United States which investigates and seeks to expose corruption and other misconduct, lists BP as number one on their listing of the 100 worst corporations based on instances of misconduct.

=== 1965 Sea Gem offshore oil rig disaster ===
In December 1965, Britain's first oil rig, Sea Gem, capsized when two of the legs collapsed during an operation to move it to a new location. The oil rig had been hastily converted in an effort to quickly start drilling operations after the North Sea was opened for exploration. Thirteen crew members were killed. No hydrocarbons were released in the accident.

=== Texas City refinery explosion and leaks ===
The former Amoco oil refinery at Texas City, Texas, was beset by environmental issues, including chemical leaks and a 2005 explosion that killed 15 people and injured hundreds. Bloomberg News described the incident, which led to a guilty plea by BP to a felony Clean Air Act charge, as "one of the deadliest U.S. industrial accidents in 20 years." The refinery was sold to Marathon Petroleum in October 2012.

==== 2005 explosion ====
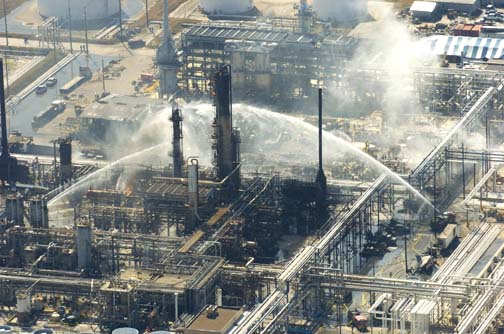
Fire-extinguishing operations after the Texas City refinery explosion

In March 2005, the Texas City refinery, one of the largest refineries owned then by BP, exploded causing 15 deaths, injuring 180 people and forcing thousands of nearby residents to remain sheltered in their homes. A 20-foot (6.1 m) column filled with hydrocarbon overflowed to form a vapour cloud, which ignited. The explosion caused all the casualties and substantial damage to the rest of the plant. The incident came as the culmination of a series of less serious accidents at the refinery, and the engineering problems were not addressed by the management. Maintenance and safety at the plant had been cut as a cost-saving measure, the responsibility ultimately resting with executives in London.

The fallout from the accident clouded BP's corporate image because of the mismanagement at the plant. There had been several investigations of the disaster, the most recent being that from the US Chemical Safety and Hazard Investigation Board which "offered a scathing assessment of the company." OSHA found "organizational and safety deficiencies at all levels of the BP Corporation" and said management failures could be traced from Texas to London. The company pleaded guilty to a felony violation of the Clean Air Act, was fined $50 million, the largest ever assessed under the Clean Air Act, and sentenced to three years probation.

On 30 October 2009, the US Occupational Safety and Health Administration (OSHA) fined BP an additional $87 million, the largest fine in OSHA history, for failing to correct safety hazards documented in the 2005 explosion. Inspectors found 270 safety violations that had been cited but not fixed and 439 new violations. BP appealed the fine. In July 2012, the company agreed to pay $13 million to settle the new violations. At that time OSHA found "no imminent dangers" at the Texas plant. Thirty violations remained under discussion. In March 2012, US Department of Justice officials said the company had met all of its obligations and subsequently ended the probationary period. In November 2011, BP agreed to pay the state of Texas $50 million for violating state emissions standards at its Texas City refinery during and after the 2005 explosion at the refinery. The state Attorney General said BP was responsible for 72 separate pollutant emissions that have been occurring every few months since March 2005. It was the largest fine ever imposed under the Texas Clean Air Act.

==== 2007 toxic substance release ====
In 2007, 143 workers at the Texas City refinery claimed that they were injured when a toxic substance was released at the plant. In December 2009, after a three-week trial, a federal jury in Galveston awarded ten of those workers $10 million each in punitive damages, in addition to smaller damages for medical expenses and pain and suffering. The plant had a history of chemical releases. In March 2010, the federal judge hearing the case reduced the jury's award to less than $500,000. U.S. District Judge Kenneth M. Hoyt said the plaintiffs failed to prove BP was grossly negligent.

==== 2010 chemical leak ====
In August 2010, the Texas Attorney General charged BP with illegally emitting harmful air pollutants from its Texas City refinery for more than a month. BP has admitted that malfunctioning equipment led to the release of over 530,000 pounds (240,000 kg) of chemicals into the air of Texas City and surrounding areas from 6 April to 16 May 2010. The leak included 17,000 pounds (7,700 kg) of benzene, 37,000 pounds (17,000 kg) of nitrogen oxides, and 186,000 pounds (84,000 kg) of carbon monoxide. The State's investigation showed that BP's failure to properly maintain its equipment caused the malfunction. When the equipment malfunctioned and caught fire, BP workers shut it down and routed escaping gases to flares. Rather than shut down associated units while compressor repairs were made, BP chose to keep operating those other units, which led to unlawful release of contaminants for almost 40 days. The Attorney General is seeking civil penalties of no less than $50 nor greater than $25,000 per day of each violation of state air quality laws, as well as attorneys' fees and investigative costs.

In June 2012, over 50,000 Texas City residents joined a class-action suit against BP, alleging they became sick in 2010 as a result of the emissions release from the refinery. BP said the release harmed no one. In October 2013, a trial designed as a test for a larger suit that includes 45,000 people found that BP was negligent in the case, but due to the lack of substantial evidence linking illness to the emissions, decided the company would be absolved of any wrongdoing.

=== Prudhoe Bay ===
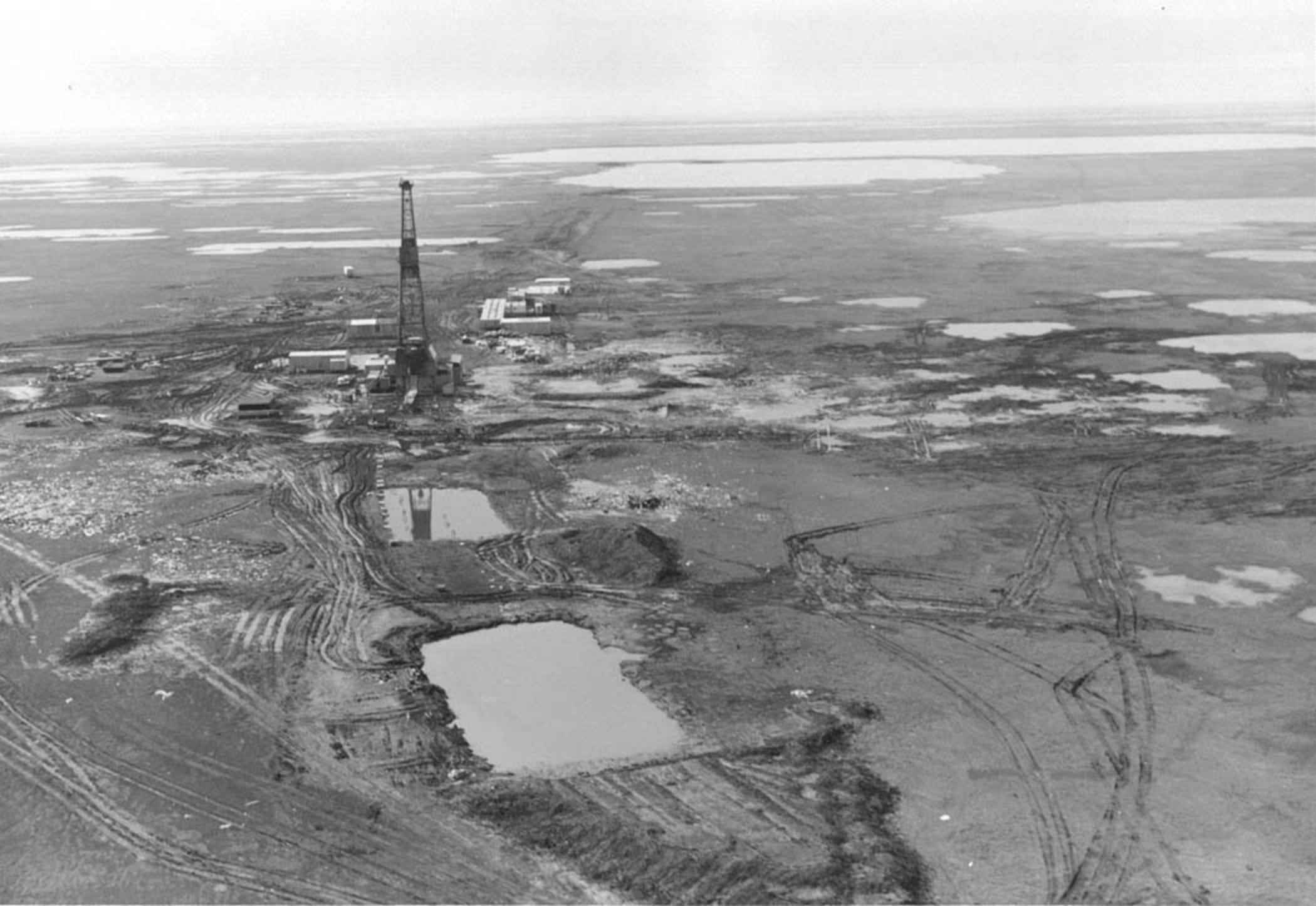
Aerial view of Prudhoe Bay

In March 2006, corrosion of a BP Exploration Alaska (BPXA) oil transit pipeline in Prudhoe Bay transporting oil to the Trans-Alaska Pipeline led to a five-day leak and the largest oil spill on Alaska's North Slope. According to the Alaska Department of Environmental Conservation (ADEC), a total of 212,252 US gallons (5,053.6 bbl; 803.46 m^{3}) of oil was spilled, covering 2 acres (0.81 ha) of the North Slope. BP admitted that cost-cutting measures had resulted in a lapse in monitoring and maintenance of the pipeline and the consequent leak. At the moment of the leak, pipeline inspection gauges (known as "pigs") had not been run through the pipeline since 1998. BP completed the clean-up of the spill by May 2006, including removal of contaminated gravel and vegetation, which was replaced with new material from the Arctic tundra.

Following the spill, the company was ordered by regulators to inspect the 35 kilometres (22 mi) of pipelines in Prudhoe Bay using "smart pigs". In late July 2006, the "smart pigs" monitoring the pipelines found 16 places where corrosion had thinned pipeline walls. A BP crew sent to inspect the pipe in early August discovered a leak and small spill, following which, BP announced that the eastern portion of the Alaskan field would be shut down for repairs on the pipeline, with approval from the Department of Transportation. The shutdown resulted in a reduction of 200,000 barrels per day (32,000 m^{3}/d) until work began to bring the eastern field to full production on 2 October 2006. In total, 23 barrels (3.7 m^{3}) of oil were spilled and 176 barrels (28.0 m^{3}) were "contained and recovered", according to ADEC. The spill was cleaned up and there was no impact upon wildlife.

After the shutdown, BP pledged to replace 26 kilometres (16 mi) of its Alaskan oil transit pipelines and the company completed work on the 16 miles (26 km) of new pipeline by the end of 2008. In November 2007, BP Exploration, Alaska pleaded guilty to negligent discharge of oil, a misdemeanour under the federal Clean Water Act and was fined US$20 million. There was no charge brought for the smaller spill in August 2006 due to BP's quick response and clean-up. On 16 October 2007, ADEC officials reported a "toxic spill" from a BP pipeline in Prudhoe Bay comprising 2,000 US gallons (7,600 L; 1,700 imp gal) of primarily methanol (methyl alcohol) mixed with crude oil and water, which spilled onto a gravel pad and frozen tundra pond.

In the settlement of a civil suit, in July 2011 investigators from the U.S. Department of Transportation's Pipeline and Hazardous Materials Safety Administration determined that the 2006 spills were a result of BPXA's failure to properly inspect and maintain the pipeline to prevent corrosion. The government issued a Corrective Action Order to BP XA that addressed the pipeline's risks and ordered pipeline repair or replacement. The U.S. Environmental Protection Agency had investigated the extent of the oil spills and oversaw BPXA's cleanup. When BP XA did not fully comply with the terms of the corrective action, a complaint was filed in March 2009 alleging violations of the Clean Water Act, the Clean Air Act and the Pipeline Safety Act. In July 2011, the U.S. District Court for the District of Alaska entered a consent decree between the United States and BPXA resolving the government's claims. Under the consent decree, BPXA paid a $25 million civil penalty, the largest per-barrel penalty at that time for an oil spill, and agreed to take measures to significantly improve inspection and maintenance of its pipeline infrastructure on the North Slope to reduce the threat of additional oil spills.

=== 2008 Caspian Sea gas leak ===
On 17 September 2008, a small gas leak was discovered and one gas-injection well broached to surface in the area of the Central Azeri platform at the Azeri oilfield, a part of the Azeri–Chirag–Guneshli (ACG) project, in the Azerbaijan sector of Caspian Sea. The platform was shut down and the staff was evacuated. As the West Azeri Platform was being powered by a cable from the Central Azeri Platform, it was also shut down. Production at the West Azeri Platform resumed on 9 October 2008 and at the Central Azeri Platform in December 2008. According to leaked US Embassy cables, BP had been "exceptionally circumspect in disseminating information" and showed that BP thought the cause for the blowout was a bad cement job. The cables further said that some of BP's ACG partners complained that the company was so secretive that it was withholding information even from them.

=== California storage tanks ===
Santa Barbara County District Attorney sued BP West Coast Products LLC, BP Products North America, Inc., and Atlantic Richfield Company over allegations that the companies violated state laws regarding operating and maintaining motor vehicle fuel underground storage tank laws. BP settled a lawsuit for $14 million. The complaint alleged that BP failed to properly inspect and maintain underground tanks used to store gasoline for retail sale at approximately 780 gas stations in California over a period of ten years and violated other hazardous material and hazardous waste laws. The case settled in November 2016 and was the result of collaboration among the California Attorney General's Office and several district attorney's offices across the state.

=== Deepwater Horizon explosion and oil spill ===
External videos
- Frontline: The Spill (54:25), Frontline on PBS

Anchor handling tugs combat the fire on the Deepwater Horizon while the United States Coast Guard searches for missing crew.

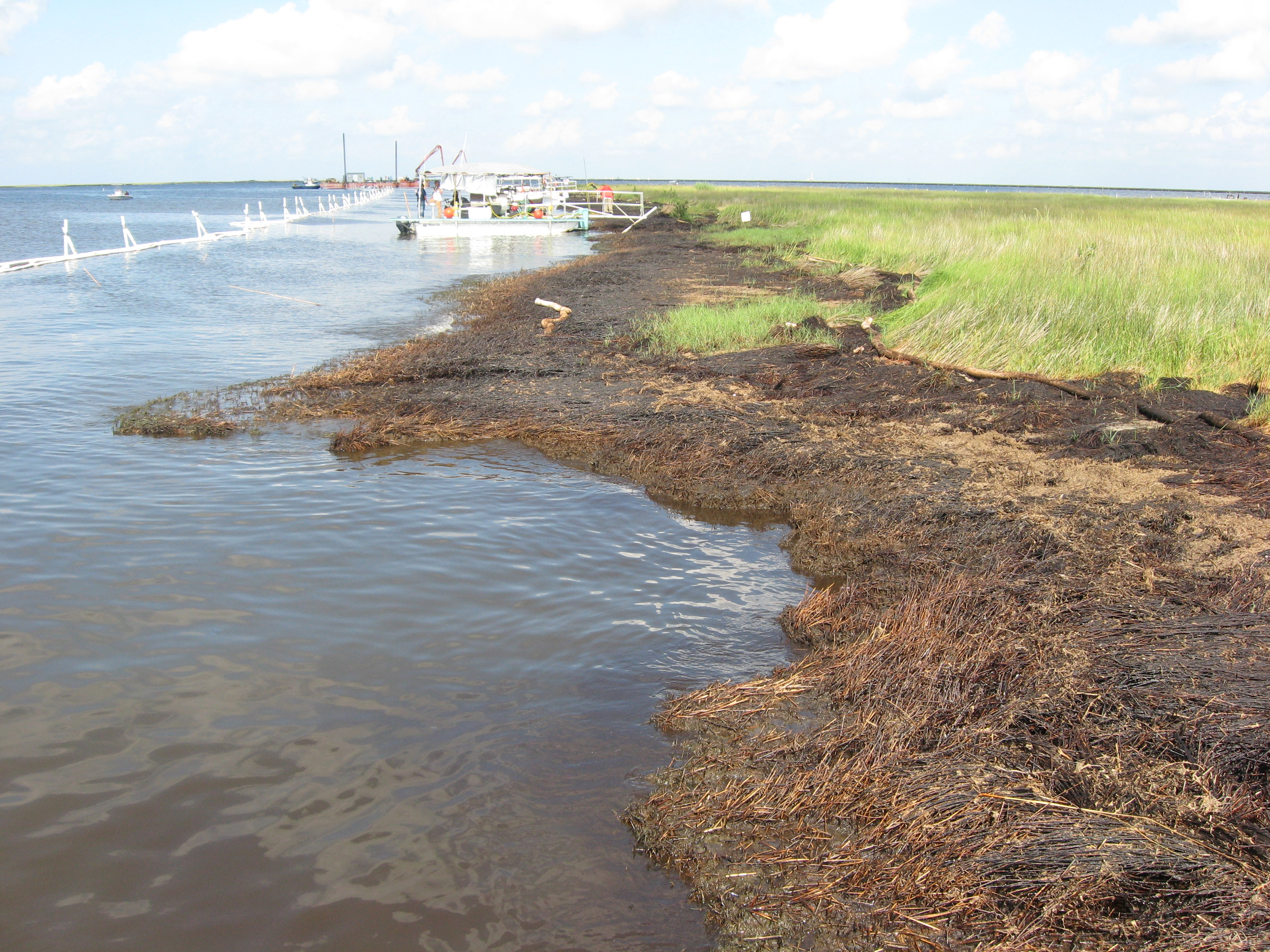
Heavy oiling of Bay Jimmy, Plaquemines Parish, 15 September 2010

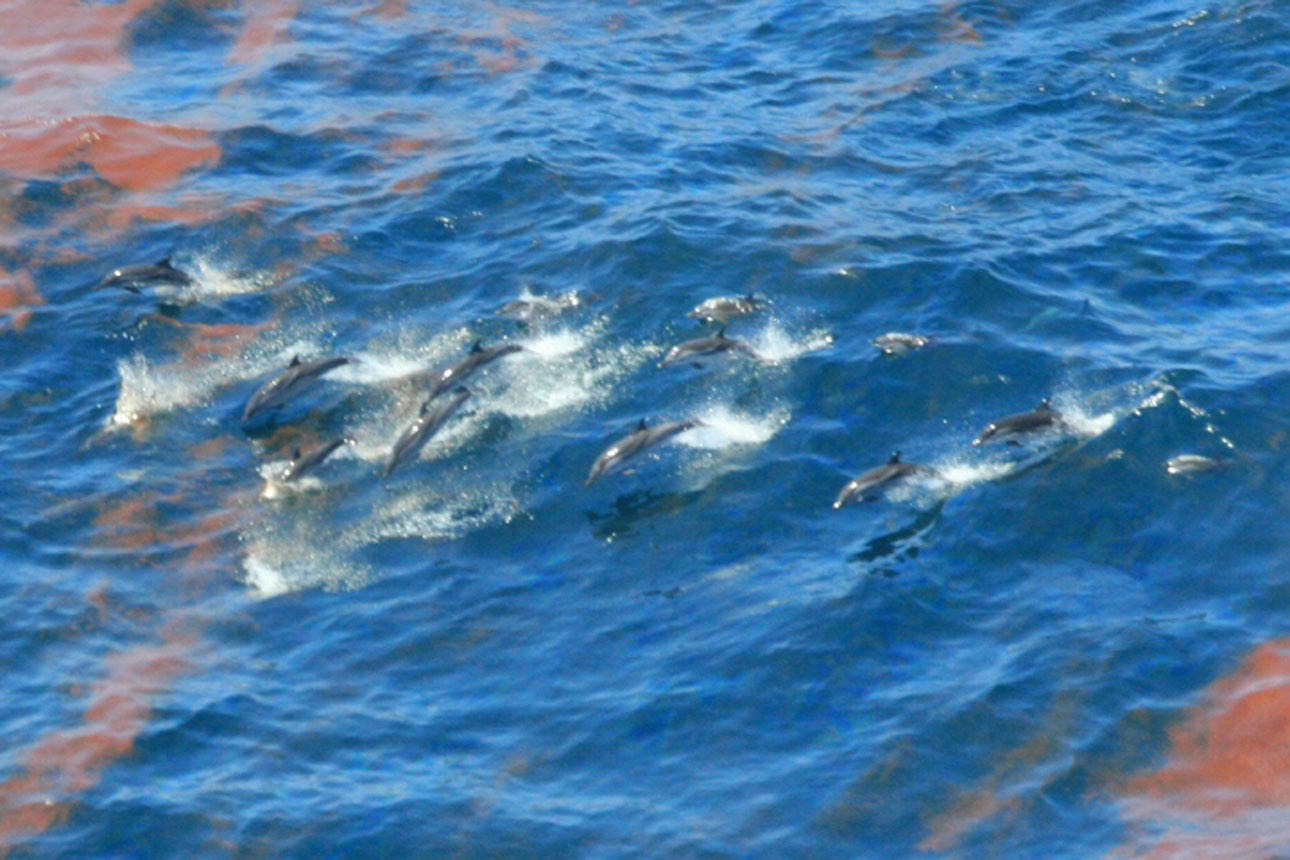
Striped dolphins (Stenella coeruleoalba) observed in emulsified oil on 29 April 2010

The Deepwater Horizon oil spill was a major industrial accident on the Gulf of Mexico, which killed 11 people and injured 16 others, leaked about 4.9 million barrels (210 million US gal; 780,000 m^{3}) of oil with ±10% uncertainty, which makes it the largest accidental marine oil spill in the history of the petroleum industry, and cost to the company more than $65 billion of cleanup costs, charges and penalties. On 20 April 2010, the semi-submersible exploratory offshore drilling rig Deepwater Horizon located in the Macondo Prospect in the Gulf of Mexico, exploded after a blowout. After burning for two days, the rig sank. The well was finally capped on 15 July 2010. Of 4.9 million barrels (210 million US gal; 780,000 m^{3}) of leaked oil 810,000 barrels (34 million US gal; 129,000 m^{3}) was collected or burned while 4.1 million barrels (170 million US gal; 650,000 m^{3}) entered the Gulf waters. 1.8 million US gallons (6,800 m^{3}) of Corexit dispersant was applied.

The spill had a strong economic impact on the Gulf Coast's economy sectors such as fishing and tourism.

==== Environmental impact ====
This oil spill caused damages across a range of species and habitats in the Gulf. Researchers say the oil and dispersant mixture, including PAHs, permeated the food chain through zooplankton. Toxicological effects have been documented in benthic and pelagic fish, estuarine communities, mammals, birds and turtles, deep-water corals, plankton, foraminifera, and microbial communities. Effects on different populations consist of increased mortality or as sub-lethal impairment on the organisms' ability to forage, reproduce and avoid predators. In 2013, it was reported that dolphins and other marine life continued to die in record numbers with infant dolphins dying at six times the normal rate, and half the dolphins examined in a December 2013 study were seriously ill or dying. BP said the report was "inconclusive as to any causation associated with the spill."

Studies in 2013 suggested that as much as one-third of the released oil remains in the gulf. Further research suggested that the oil on the bottom of the seafloor was not degrading. Oil in affected coastal areas increased erosion due to the death of mangrove trees and marsh grass.

Researchers looking at sediment, seawater, biota, and seafood found toxic compounds in high concentrations that they said was due to the added oil and dispersants. Although Gulf fisheries recovered in 2011, a 2014 study of the effects of the oil spill on bluefin tuna by researchers at Stanford University and the National Oceanic and Atmospheric Administration, published in the journal Science, found that toxins released by the oil spill sent fish into cardiac arrest. The study found that even very low concentrations of crude oil can slow the pace of fish heartbeats. BP disputed the study, which was conducted as part of the federal Natural Resource Damage Assessment process required by the Oil Pollution Act. The study also found that oil already broken down by wave action and chemical dispersants was more toxic than fresh oil. Another peer-reviewed study, released in March 2014 and conducted by 17 scientists from the United States and Australia and published in Proceedings of the National Academy of Sciences, found that tuna and amberjack that were exposed to oil from the spill developed deformities of the heart and other organs. BP responded that the concentrations of oil in the study were a level rarely seen in the Gulf, but The New York Times reported that the BP statement was contradicted by the study.

==== Effects on human health ====
Research discussed at a 2013 conference included preliminary results of an ongoing study being done by the National Institute for Environmental Health Sciences indicating that oil spill cleanup workers carry biomarkers of chemicals contained in the spilled oil and the dispersants used. A separate study is following the health issues of women and children affected by the spill. Several studies found that a "significant percentage" of Gulf residents reported mental health problems such as anxiety, depression and PTSD. According to a Columbia University study investigating the health effects among children living less than 10 miles from the coast, more than a third of the parents report physical or mental health symptoms among their children.

Australia's 60 Minutes reported that people living along the gulf coast were becoming sick from the mixture of Corexit and oil. Susan Shaw, of the Deepwater Horizon oil spill Strategic Sciences Working Group, says "BP told the public that Corexit was 'as harmless as Dawn dishwashing liquid'...But BP and the EPA clearly knew about the toxicity of the Corexit long before this spill." According to Shaw, BP's own safety sheet on Corexit says that there are "high and immediate human health hazards". Cleanup workers were not provided safety equipment by the company, and the safety manuals were "rarely if ever" followed, or distributed to workers, according to a Newsweek investigation. The safety manuals read: "Avoid breathing vapor" and "Wear suitable protective clothing." Oil clean up workers reported that they were not allowed to use respirators, and that their jobs were threatened if they did.

A peer-reviewed study published in The American Journal of Medicine reported significantly altered blood profiles of individuals exposed to the spilled oil and dispersants that put them at increased risk of developing liver cancer, leukemia and other disorders. BP disputed its methodology and said other studies supported its position that dispersants did not create a danger to health.

In 2014, a study was published in Proceedings of the National Academy of Sciences which found heart deformities in fish exposed to oil from the spill. The researchers said that their results probably apply to humans as well as fish.

==== Civil and criminal suits ====
On 15 December 2010, the Department of Justice filed a civil and criminal suit against BP and other defendants for violations under the Clean Water Act in the U.S. District Court for the Eastern District of Louisiana. The case was consolidated with about 200 others, including those brought by state governments, individuals, and companies under Multi-District Litigation docket MDL No. 2179, before U.S. District Judge Carl Barbier.

In November 2012, BP and the Department of Justice reached a $4 billion settlement of all federal criminal charges related to the explosion and spill. Under the settlement, BP agreed to plead guilty to 11 felony counts of manslaughter, two misdemeanors, and a felony count of lying to Congress and agreed to four years of government monitoring of its safety practices and ethics. BP also paid $525 million to settle civil charges by the Securities and Exchange Commission that it misled investors about the flow rate of oil from the well. At the same time, the US government filed criminal charges against three BP employees; two site managers were charged with manslaughter and negligence, and one former vice president with obstruction.

Judge Barbier ruled in the first phase of the case that BP had committed gross negligence and that "its employees took risks that led to the largest environmental disaster in U.S. history." He apportioned fault at 67% for BP, 30% for Transocean and 3% for Halliburton. Barbier ruled that BP was "reckless" and had acted with "conscious disregard of known risks."

==== Claims settlement ====
In June 2010, after a meeting in the White House between President Barack Obama and BP executives, the president announced that BP would pay $20 billion into a trust fund that will be used to compensate victims of the oil spill. BP also set aside $100 million to compensate oil workers who lost their jobs because of the spill.

On 2 March 2012, BP and businesses and residents affected by the spill reached a settlement of roughly 100,000 suits claiming economic losses. BP estimated that the settlement cost more than $9.2 billion.

In 2015, BP and five states agreed to an $18.5 billion settlement to be used for Clean Water Act penalties and various claims.

=== 2022 Ohio refinery fire ===
On 20 September 2022, a fire at BP's Husky Toledo refinery caused the death of two workers there. The fire was put out that day, but the refinery remained shut down. The refinery's shutdown was expected to increase American petrol prices. Officials subsequently announced that it would have little impact on prices. The refinery started operating again in April 2023.

=== Security incidents ===
In March 2026, foreigners working for the energy company BP were evacuated from the Rumaila oil field in Iraq after two drones landed at the field undetected. The company assured that all the necessary steps were being taken to ensure the safety of the personnel and the partners, and the situation was being monitored.

== Political influence ==
=== Lobbying for Libyan prisoner transfer release ===
BP lobbied the British government to conclude a prisoner-transfer agreement which the Libyan government had wanted to secure the release of Abdelbaset al-Megrahi, the only person convicted for the 1988 Lockerbie bombing over Scotland, which killed 270 people. BP stated that it pressed for the conclusion of prisoner transfer agreement amid fears that delays would damage its "commercial interests" and disrupt its £900 million offshore drilling operations in the region, but it said that it had not been involved in negotiations concerning the release of Megrahi.

=== Political contributions and lobbying ===
In February 2002, BP's then-chief executive, Lord Browne of Madingley, renounced the practice of corporate campaign contributions, saying: "That's why we've decided, as a global policy, that from now on we will make no political contributions from corporate funds anywhere in the world." When the Washington Post reported in June 2010 that BP North America "donated at least $4.8 million in corporate contributions in the past seven years to political groups, partisan organizations and campaigns engaged in federal and state elections", mostly to oppose ballot measures in two states aiming to raise taxes on the oil industry, the company said that the commitment had only applied to contributions to individual candidates.

During the 2008 U.S. election cycle, BP employees contributed to various candidates, with Barack Obama receiving the largest amount of money, broadly in line with contributions from Shell and Chevron, but significantly less than those of Exxon Mobil.

In 2009, BP spent nearly $16 million lobbying the U.S. Congress. In 2011, BP spent a total of $8,430,000 on lobbying and had 47 registered lobbyists.

=== Oman 1954 War ===
In 1937, Iraq Petroleum Company (IPC), 23.75% owned by BP, signed an oil concession agreement with the Sultan of Muscat. In 1952, IPC offered financial support to raise an armed force that would assist the Sultan in occupying the interior region of Oman, an area that geologists believed to be rich in oil. This led to the 1954 outbreak of Jebel Akhdar War in Oman that lasted for more than five years.

== Market manipulation investigations and sanctions ==
The US Justice Department and the Commodity Futures Trading Commission filed charges against BP Products North America Inc. (subsidiary of BP plc) and several BP traders, alleging they conspired to raise the price of propane by seeking to corner the propane market in 2004. In 2006, one former trader pleaded guilty. In 2007, BP paid $303 million in restitution and fines as part of an agreement to defer prosecution. BP was charged with cornering and manipulating the price of TET propane in 2003 and 2004. BP paid a $125 million civil monetary penalty to the CFTC, established a compliance and ethics program, and installed a monitor to oversee BP's trading activities in the commodities markets. BP also paid $53 million into a restitution fund for victims, a $100 million criminal penalty, plus $25 million into a consumer fraud fund, as well as other payments. Also in 2007, four other former traders were charged. These charges were dismissed by a US District Court in 2009 on the grounds that the transactions were exempt under the Commodities Exchange Act because they didn't occur in a marketplace but were negotiated contracts among sophisticated companies. The dismissal was upheld by the Court of Appeals for the 5th Circuit in 2011.

In November 2010, US regulators FERC and CFTC began an investigation of BP for allegedly manipulating the gas market. The investigation relates to trading activity that occurred in October and November 2008. At that time, CFTC Enforcement staff provided BP with a notice of intent to recommend charges of attempted market manipulation in violation of the Commodity Exchange Act. BP denied that it engaged in "any inappropriate or unlawful activity." In July 2011, the FERC staff issued a "Notice of Alleged Violations" saying it had preliminarily determined that several BP entities fraudulently traded physical natural gas in the Houston Ship Channel and Katy markets and trading points to increase the value of their financial swing spread positions.

In May 2013, the European Commission started an investigation into allegations the companies reported distorted prices to the price reporting agency Platts, in order to "manipulate the published prices" for several oil and biofuel products. The investigation was dropped in December 2015 due to lack of evidence.

A dataset of gasoline prices of BP, Caltex, Woolworths, Coles, and Gull from Perth gathered in the years 2001 to 2015 was used to show by statistical analysis the tacit collusion between these retailers.

Documents from a 2016 bid to drill in the Great Australian Bight revealed claims by BP that a large-scale cleanup operation following a massive oil spill would bring a "welcome boost to local economies." In the same bid BP also stated that a diesel spill would be "socially acceptable" due to a lack of "unresolved stakeholder concerns".

An internal email from mid 2017, was leaked in April 2018 in New Zealand. The email laid out that pricing was to be raised at certain sites in a region around Otaki in order to regain volume lost at that branch. This led to the Government asking the Commerce Commission to investigate regional prices: initial indications were that motorists were paying too much across most of the country.

In June 2026, New Zealand's Commerce Commission announced they were filing charges against BP alleging it failed to give customers discounts they were entitled to.

== Company impact on climate ==
BP's operations contribute to climate change, primarily through greenhouse gas (GHG) emissions associated with oil extraction and refining. The refining process emits substantial amounts of carbon dioxide and methane, both of which are major contributors to global warming (Zaharova & Lihacheva, 2021). Despite advancements in operational efficiency, the broader petrochemical industry continues to be a major source of air pollution due to the combustion of fossil fuels (Isella & Manca, 2022).

In Iraq, BP's involvement in oil production at the Rumaila field has been linked to environmental degradation, notably through crude oil spills that have resulted in heavy metal contamination of surrounding soils. BP has made public commitments to reduce its emissions, but recent developments suggest a renewed strategic emphasis on expanding oil and gas operations, prompting concerns about the company's alignment with long-term climate goals.

At the same time, climate change is creating challenges for BP's operations. More frequent extreme weather events, such as hurricanes and heatwaves, have disrupted offshore drilling and refining processes, leading to increased costs and production delays. In Iraq, rising temperatures and worsening environmental conditions are affecting oil extraction, complicating BP's ability to maintain steady output. In response to environmental concerns, BP has acknowledged that those impacted by pollution exceeding national limits are entitled to compensation. However, growing regulatory pressure and increasing public scrutiny could push BP to implement stricter emissions policies in the future.

== See also ==
- List of companies based in London

== Bibliography ==
=== Commissioned works ===
(In chronological order)

- Ferrier, R.W. (1982). The History of the British Petroleum Company: The Developing Years 1901–1932. Vol. I. Cambridge: Cambridge University Press. ISBN 978-0-521-24647-7.
- Bamberg, James H (1994). The History of the British Petroleum Company: The Anglo-Iranian Years, 1928–1954. Vol. II. Cambridge: Cambridge University Press. ISBN 978-0-521-25950-7.
- Bamberg, James H (2000). The History of the British Petroleum Company: British Petroleum and Global Oil, 1950–1975: The Challenge of Nationalism. Vol. III. Cambridge: Cambridge University Press. ISBN 978-0-521-78515-0.
- BP. Annual Report and Form 20-F 2018 (PDF).
- BP. Annual Report and Form 20-F 2024 (PDF).
- BP. Preliminary Results 2024 (PDF).

=== Other works ===
- Alsharhan, A. S.; Nairn, A. E. M. (1997). Sedimentary basins and petroleum geology of the Middle East (2 ed.). Elsevier. ISBN 978-0-444-82465-3.
- Atabaki, Touraj; Bini, Elisabetta; Ehsani, Kaveh, eds. (2018). Working for Oil: Comparative Social Histories of Labor in the Global Oil Industry. Springer. ISBN 978-3-319-56445-6.
- Bailey, Martin (1978). Shell and BP in South Africa (2nd ed.). Birmingham: Haslemere Group/Anti-Apartheid. ISBN 0-905094-02-6.
- Bayne Fisher, W. William; Avery, P.; Hambly, G. R. G.; Melville, C. (1991). The Cambridge History of Iran, Volume 7. Cambridge University Press. p. 1096. ISBN 978-0-521-20095-0.
- Beale, Nicholas (2012). Constructive Engagement: Directors and Investors in Action. Gower Publishing. ISBN 978-1-4094-5782-4.
- Black, Edwin (2011). British Petroleum and the Redline Agreement The West's Secret Pact to Get Mideast Oil. Washington, DC: Dialog Press. ISBN 978-0-914153-15-3.
- Boscheck, Ralf (2008). Strategies, Markets and Governance: Exploring Commercial and Regulatory Agendas. Cambridge University Press. p. 360. ISBN 978-0-521-86845-7.
- Brune, Lester H. (2003). Burns, Richard Dean (ed.). Chronological History of U.S. Foreign Relations: 1932–1988 (2 ed.). Routledge. ISBN 978-0-415-93916-4.
- Kinzer, Stephen (2003). All the Shah's Men: An American Coup and the Roots of Middle East Terror. Wiley. p. 272. ISBN 978-0-471-26517-7.
- Lauterpacht, E. (1973). International Law Reports. Cambridge University Press. p. 560. ISBN 978-0-521-46391-1.
- Louis, Wm. Roger (2007). Ends of British Imperialism: The Scramble for Empire, Suez, and Decolonization. I.B.Tauris. p. 1082. ISBN 978-1-84511-347-6.
- Marwick, William Hutton (1964). Scotland in Modern Times: An Outline of Economic and Social Development Since the Union Of 1707. Frank Cass and Company Limited. p. 175. ISBN 978-0-7146-1342-0.
- Meyer, Karl E; Brysac, Shareen (2008). Kingmakers: The Invention of the Modern Middle East. New York: W.W. Norton. ISBN 978-0-393-06199-4.
- Ritchie, Berry (1995). Portrait in Oil: An Illustrated History of BP. London: James & James. ISBN 0-907383-67-X.
- Safina, Carl (2011). A Sea in Flames:The Deepwater Horizon Oil Blowout. Crown Publishers. ISBN 978-0-307-88735-1.
- Sampson, Anthony (1975). The Seven Sisters: The Great Oil Companies And The World They Shaped. New York: Viking Press. ISBN 0-670-63591-X. (Also 4th, revised, edition (1991). The Seven Sisters: The 100-year battle for the world's oil supply. New York: Bantam Books. ISBN 0-553-24237-7.)
- Sztucki, Jerzy (1984). Interim measures in the Hague Court. Brill Archive. ISBN 978-90-6544-093-8.
- Vassiliou, M. S. (2009). Historical Dictionary of the Petroleum Industry: Volume 3. Scarecrow Press. p. 662. ISBN 978-0-8108-5993-7.
- Yergin, Daniel (1991). The Prize: The Epic Quest for Oil, Money, and Power. New York: Simon & Schuster. ISBN 0-671-50248-4.
- ——————— (2011). The Quest: Energy, Security, and the Remaking of the Modern World. New York: Penguin Press. ISBN 978-1-59420-283-4.
