= Aberdeen Lifeboat Station =

RNLI lifeboat station in Aberdeenshire, Scotland

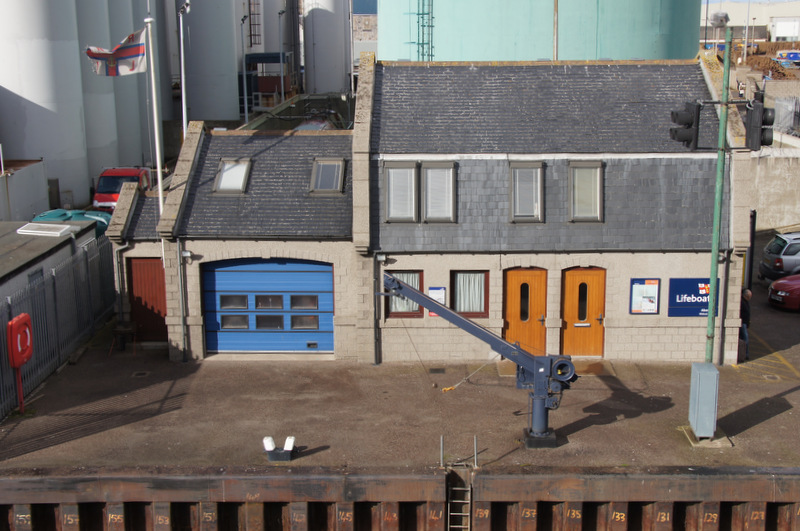
- Aberdeen Lifeboat Station

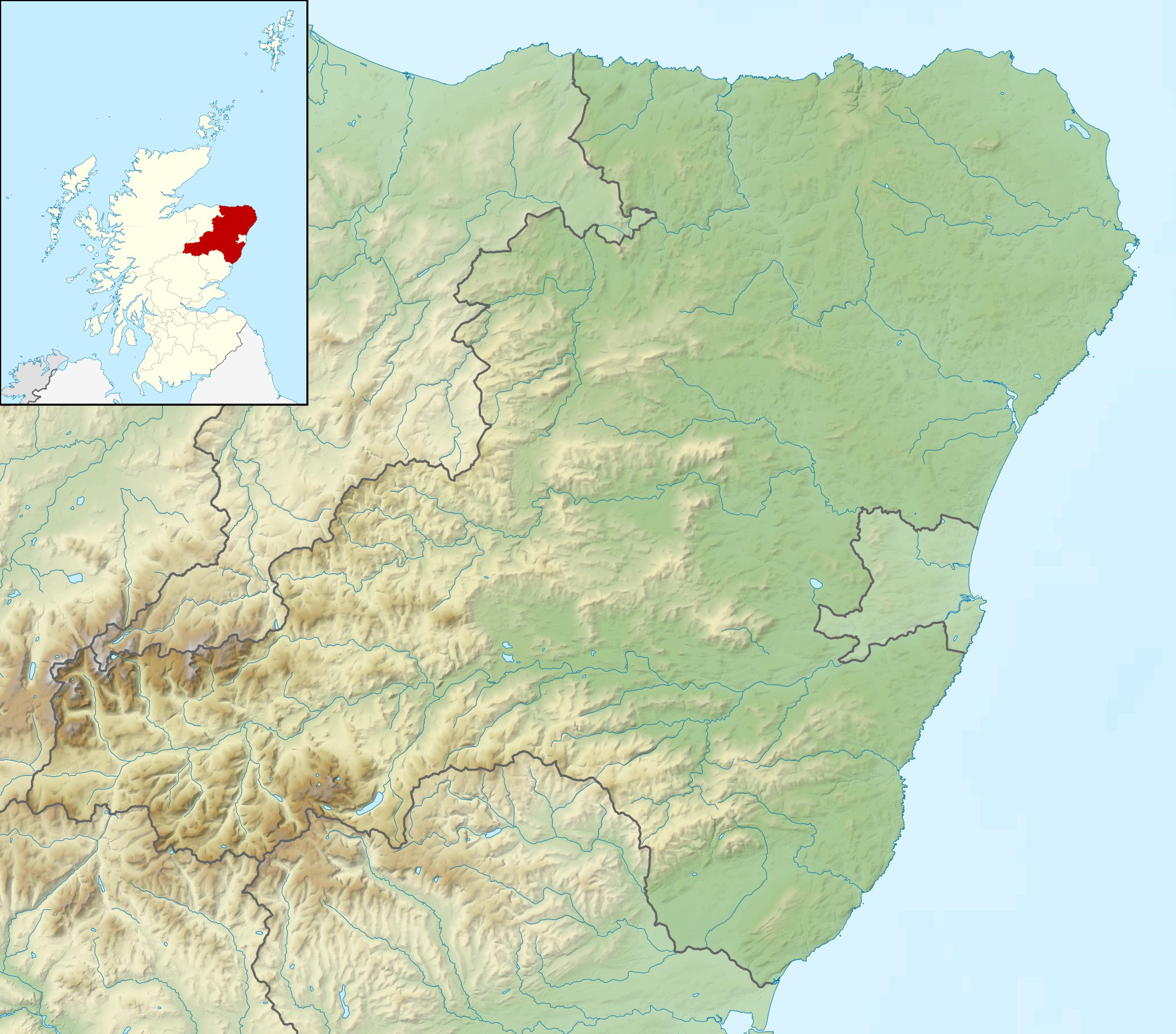
- Location within Aberdeenshire

General information
- Type: RNLI Lifeboat Station
- Location: Victoria Dock Entrance, Waterloo Quay, Aberdeen, AB11 5DF, Scotland
- Coordinates: 57°08′39″N 2°04′52″W
- Opened: 1802; 1925 RNLI
- Owner: Royal National Lifeboat Institution

Website
- Aberdeen RNLI Lifeboat Station

Aberdeen Lifeboat Station is located at the entrance to Victoria Dock, in Aberdeen, a port city which sits at the mouth of the River Dee, in the historic county of Aberdeenshire, on the east coast of Scotland.

A lifeboat was first stationed at Aberdeen in 1802 by the Aberdeen Shipmaster Society, taken over by the Aberdeen Harbour Commissioners in 1810. The management of the station was transferred to the Royal National Lifeboat Institution (RNLI) in 1925.

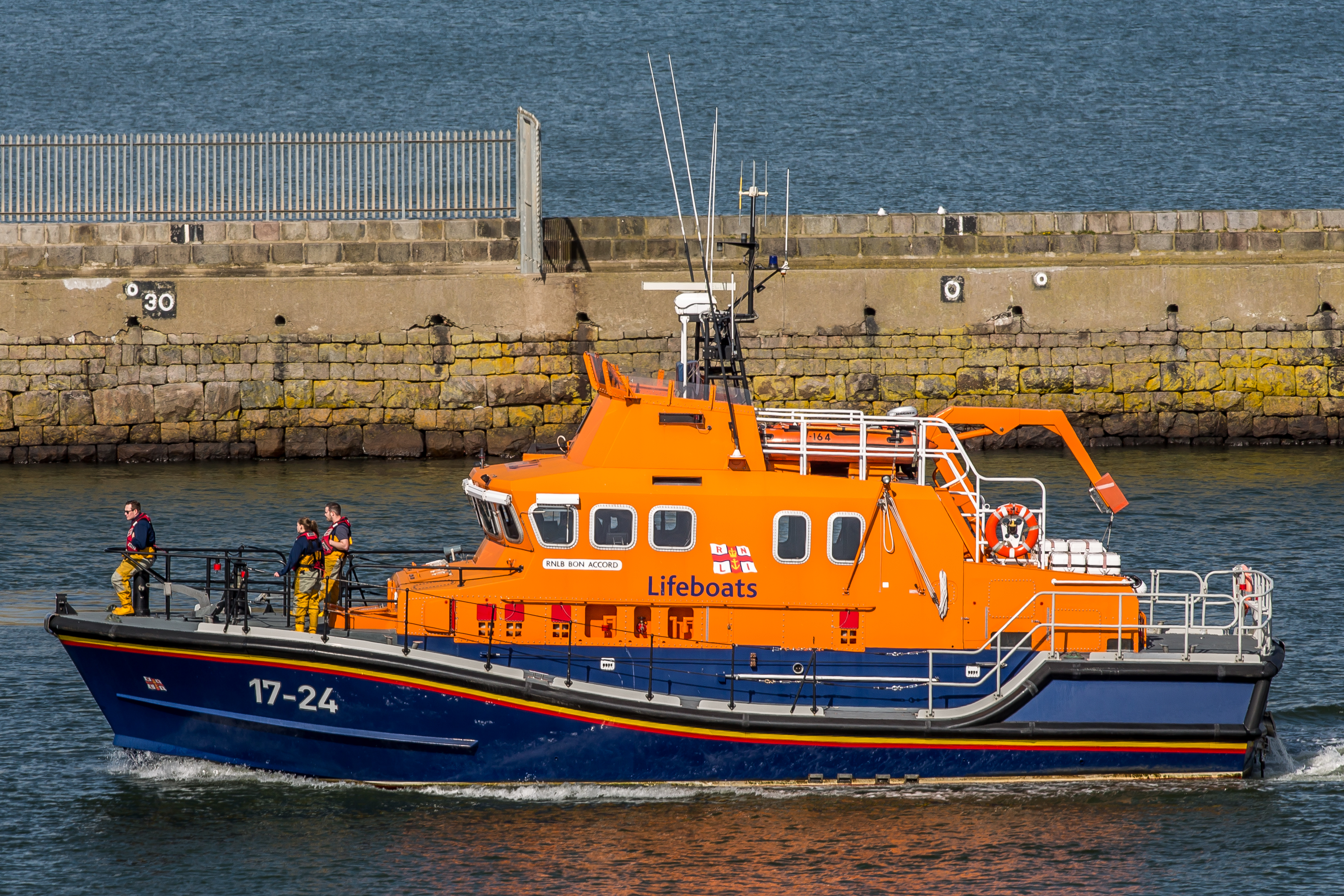
17-24 Bon Accord (ON 1248) in 2017.

The station currently operates a Severn-class All-weather lifeboat, the 17-24 Bon Accord (ON 1248), on station since 2000, and a D-class (IB1) Inshore lifeboat, the Buoy Woody 85N (D-830), on station since 2018.

== History ==
In a great storm of January 1800, a considerable number of ships were wrecked off the Aberdeenshire coast. This prompted moves for a lifeboat in Aberdeen. However, public donations failed to be sufficient, and it was Alexander Baxter of Glassel, Lord Rector of Marischal College, who would fund the first lifeboat for the Aberdeen Shipmasters' Society.

A 30 ft (9.1 m) 10-oared lifeboat was constructed by Henry Greathead of South Shields, arriving in Aberdeen in 1802. Only one boat of this type survives to this day, and is on display at Zetland lifeboat museum in Redcar.

The lifeboat was stationed at Footdee, on the north side on the entrance to Aberdeen Harbour, at the mouth (or foot) of the River Dee. The first lifeboat house is marked next to the Observatory (Port Entrance Control Tower) at Abercromby Jetty, on Thomas Telford's map of 1828, although the Greathead lifeboat is recorded as being wrecked in March 1820. No other details are known.

Aberdeen's second lifeboat was built by Wake of Sunderland, at a cost of £100, and was funded from Harbour dues. The boat arrived at Aberdeen in 1843, and was named Bon Accord. The 'Beach' lifeboat served Aberdeen for 10 years, and was then retained as a reserve lifeboat for a further 17 years after replacement.

In 1853, the Aberdeen Harbour Commissioners purchased a 30-foot Peake self-righting (P&S) from Forrestt of Limehouse, London. The lifeboat had a carriage for transportation and launching, and was stationed at the north corner of North Square, Footdee. The lifeboat again took the name Bon Accord. A second 'Harbour' lifeboat, Bon Accord No. 2, was provided in 1875, and was suspended in a shed above the water, at the landing jetty at Lower Quay. Just one lifeboat crew, a Master, Mate and 10 men, were selected each year from the harbour pilots, as it was thought highly unlikely that both boats would be required at the same time. Both lifeboats remained in service until 1924, by which time it is estimated that Aberdeen lifeboats had saved a total of 589 lives.

Two self-righting lifeboats, of unrecorded dimensions, were presented to the Kincardine Lifeboat Association at Stonehaven, and to the Fishermens Committee in Aberdeen in 1854, the gifts of Miss Lydia Ann Barclay of Aberdeen, a minister for the Society of Friends. The Stonehaven crew ultimately refused to use their boat, as it was too heavy, and didn't actually self-right. Whilst no further details can be found for the Aberdeen boat, and with both boats having been constructed by Skinner of Aberdeen, it is likely to have suffered the same fate.

== Transfer to RNLI ==
The RNLI committee of management had for some time felt that it would be in the best interest of everyone, if the management of the Aberdeen lifeboats was taken over by the RNLI. The issue was discussed in both 1900 and 1915, but ultimately, the Aberdeen Harbour Commissioners concluded that "no advantage would be gained by the transference of the service to the Institution."

On 13 October 1923, the Aberdeen fishing trawler Imperial Prince was wrecked off Belhelvie. The Aberdeen Harbour lifeboat was launched, but broached as she approached the wreck. Four lifeboat men were washed overboard, but all regained the lifeboat. The Newburgh lifeboat James Stevens No. 19 (ON 459) was pulled 7 miles (11 km) overland to the scene, where with 11 crew from HMS Vampire and HMS Vendetta, both vessels had been at Aberdeen at the time, she was launched four times to the wreck. With assistance from the Peterhead lifeboat, and the Coastguard Rocket Brigade, seven of the nine crew of the trawler were rescued. Two silver medals, and one bronze medal, were awarded for gallantry that day.

Soon afterwards, discussions were held, with a view to the RNLI taking over management of the lifeboats. The RNLI brought a motor-lifeboat to Aberdeen on demonstration. At this time, one of the lifeboats still in use at Aberdeen was 70-years-old. After much discussion, the lifeboats and equipment of Aberdeen Harbour Commissioners were handed over to the RNLI on 1 January 1925.

The first RNLI lifeboat, placed on service temporarily at the No.1 station in 1925, was Reserve No.7C (ON 505) from the Relief fleet, a 40-foot Watson-class 'Pulling and Sailing' (P&S) lifeboat, with oars and sails. However, this boat was replaced the following year, with a motor-powered 60-foot Barnett lifeboat, Emma Constance (ON 693), one of only three of this type and size to enter service with the RNLI. Too large to be housed in a boathouse, from this time, the No.1 station lifeboat would be permanently afloat.

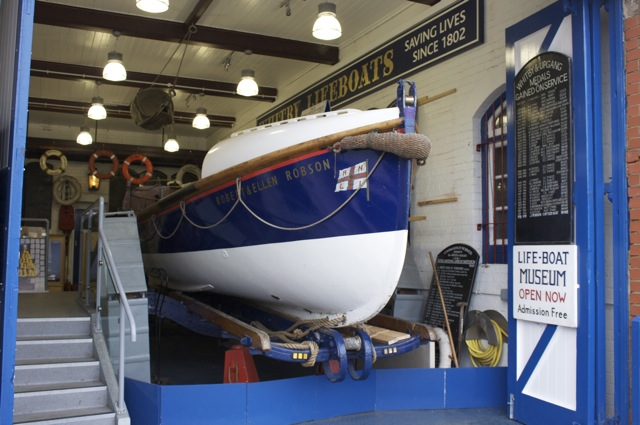
Robert and Ellen Robson (ON 669) at Whitby Lifeboat Museum

Also arriving on service in 1925, and placed at the No.2 station at North Square, Footdee, was the 34-foot self-righting (P&S) lifeboat Robert and Ellen Robson (ON 669). She would later serve at Whitby from 1947 until 1957, the last 'Pulling and Sailing' lifeboat on service with the RNLI. The boat has been restored, and is currently on display at the RNLI Lifeboat Museum at Whitby.

A legacy of £1,350 left to the Harbour Commissioners in 1894, which with accumulated interest amounted to nearly £3,000, was transferred to the RNLI in 1925, to defray the cost of a new lifeboat. The Liverpool-class lifeboat George and Elizabeth Gow (ON 827), eventually costing over £16,000, was placed on service in 1939.

Between 1924 and 1962, the No.2 station boat was launched on service only seven times, the majority of calls being taken by the larger No.1 station motor lifeboat. The No.2 station was formally closed on 23 April 1962. After some years unused, and then a period with the Royal Naval Auxiliary Service, the building was demolished.

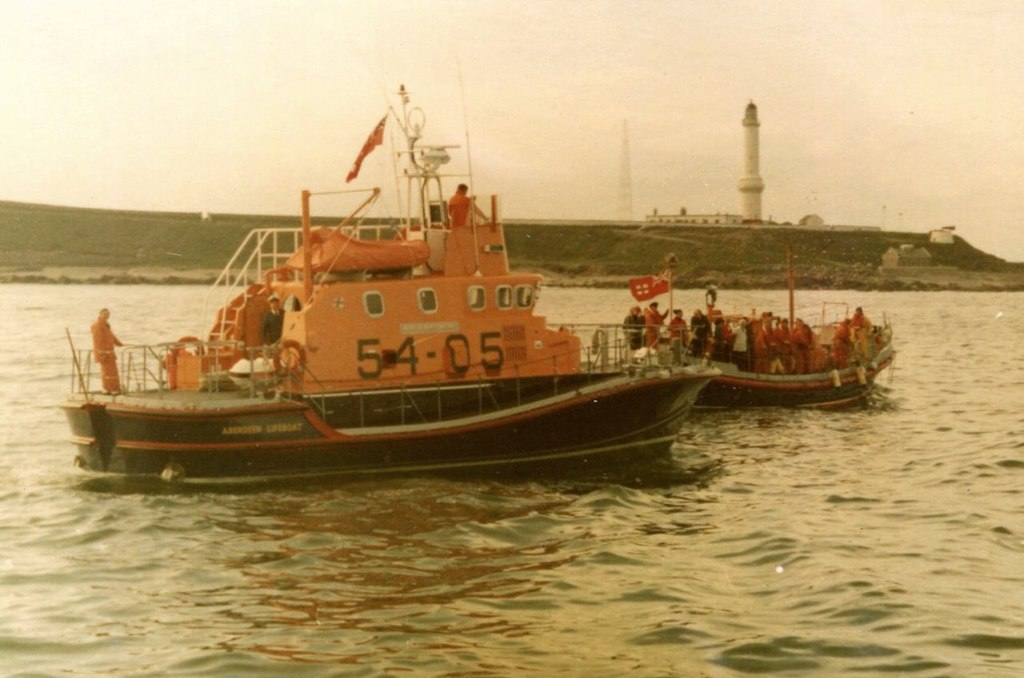
Aberdeen Arun-class lifeboat 52-05 B.P. Forties (ON 1050) (1976–1998)

On Wednesday 8 September 1976, the bright orange colour of Aberdeen's new 54-foot Arun-class All-weather lifeboat contrasted with the otherwise grey day at Regent Quay, where a crowd had assembled for the naming ceremony. Music was provided by the Royal Marines Band, and the Grampian Police Pipe Band. Major Sir David Edward Charles Steel DSO MC TD, chairman of British Petroleum, formally handed over the lifeboat to the RNLI, the company having donated £100,000 towards the cost. A cheque for £7,000 was then presented to the RNLI, on behalf of the 'Students of Aberdeen', to defray the costs of the lifeboat's electronic equipment. After a service of dedication, the lifeboat was named 52-05 B.P. Forties (ON 1050).

In 2000, Aberdeen station would receive their sixth 'afloat' lifeboat, the Severn-class All-weather lifeboat 17-24 Bon Accord (ON 1248), funded primarily from the legacy of Miss Janette Reid and the 'Aberdeen Lifeboat Appeal'.

== Station honours ==
The following are awards made at Aberdeen:

- RNIPLS Gold Medal
  Lt. Henry Randall, RN, H.M. Coastguard – 1825
- RNIPLS Silver Medal
  Lt. John Procter Sanderson, RN, H.M. Coastguard – 1830
  Lt. Thomas William Langton, RN, H.M. Coastguard – 1830
  James Robinson, Steam Tug Owner – 1844
- RNLI Silver Medal
  Thomas Marshall Sinclair, Coxswain – 1937
  Thomas Marshall Sinclair, Coxswain – 1937 (Second-Service clasp)
  Albert William Bird, Coxswain – 1974
  Ian Jack, Motor Mechanic – 1974
- RNLI Bronze Medal
  Thomas Marshall Sinclair, Coxswain – 1936
  Alexander Weir, Mechanic – 1937
  John Masson, crew member – 1937
  George Alan Flett, Second Coxswain – 1937
  Robert James Brown Esson, Acting Motor Mechanic – 1937
  Charles Begg, Second Coxswain – 1976
- 'The Thanks of the Institution inscribed on Vellum'
  George Alan Flett, Second Coxswain – 1937
  James Cowper, Second Assistant Mechanic – 1937
  Robert James Brown Esson, Assistant Mechanic – 1937
  John M. Noble, crew member – 1937
  Alexander S Masson, crew member – 1937
  George Alan Flett, Coxswain – 1953
  George Alan Flett, Coxswain – 1956
  George Walker, Assistant Mechanic – 1974
  F. Cruickshank, crew member – 1974
  A. Walker, crew member – 1974
  Ian Jack, Motor Mechanic – 1976
- Member, Order of the British Empire (MBE)
  William Grieve Deans, Lifeboat Operations Manager – 2018QBH
- British Empire Medal
  Rebecca Allen – 2024KBH

== Aberdeen lifeboats ==
=== Shipmaster Society / Harbour Commissioners ===
Name	Built	On station	Class	Comments
Unnamed	1802	1802–1820	Greathead-class	(Note: 30 ft 0 in (9.14 m) x 8 ft 9 in (2.67 m) (10-oared) non-self-righting lifeboat, gift of Alexander Baxter, built by Henry Greathead of South Shields.); Wrecked on service, March 1820.
Station Closed 1820–1843
Bon Accord	1843	1843–1853	26-foot North Country non-self-righting	(Note: 26 ft 0 in (7.92 m) x 9 ft 0 in (2.74 m) (8-oared) non-self-righting lifeboat, funded by Harbour Dues, built by Wake of Sunderland, costing £100.) (Beach lifeboat). Reserve lifeboat 1853–c.1870
Bon Accord (No.1)	1853	1853–1924	30-foot Peake self-righting (P&S)	(Note: 30 ft 0 in (9.14 m) x 7 ft 8 in (2.34 m) (12-oared) Peake self-righting (P&S) lifeboat, funded by Aberdeen Harbour Trust, built by Forrestt of Limehouse, London.) (Beach lifeboat).
Bon Accord No.2	1875	1875–1924	34-foot self-righting (P&S)	(Note: 34 ft 0 in (10.36 m) x 8 ft 0 in (2.44 m) (12-oared) self-righting (P&S) lifeboat., funded by the Aberdeen Harbour Commissioners, built by the Harbour Board Boatyard.) (Harbour Lifeboat). Broken up in 1925.

=== Fisherman's Committee ===
Name	Built	On station	Class	Comments
Unknown	1854	1854−????	Self-righting lifeboat	(Note: Self-righting lifeboat, gift of Miss Lydia A. Barclay of Aberdeen, built by Skinner of Aberdeen.)

=== RNLI lifeboats ===
==== No. 1 Station (harbour) ====
ON (Note: ON is the RNLI's Official Number of the boat.)	Op.No. (Note: Op.No. is the RNLI's Operational Number of the boat carried on the hull.)	Name	Built	On station	Class	Comments
505	–	Reserve No. 7C	1903	1925–1926	40-foot Watson-class (P&S)	(Note: 40 ft 0 in (12.19 m) x 11 ft 0 in (3.35 m) (12-oared) Watson-class non-self-righting (P&S) lifeboat, legacy of Mr W. Roberts of Manchester, built by Thames Ironworks, of Blackwall, London, costing £1,606.); Previously William Roberts at Little Haven. Transferred to Fowey.
693	–	Emma Constance	1926	1926–1951	60-foot Barnett	
889	–	Hilton Briggs	1951	1951–1958	52-foot Barnett (Mk.I)	Transferred to Fenit.
944	–	Ramsay Dyce	1958	1958–1976	52-foot Barnett (Mk.II)	Transferred to the Relief fleet. Later at Lochinver.
1050	52-05	B.P. Forties	1975	1976–1998	Arun	
1135	52-39	Mickie Salvesen	1988	1998–2000	Arun	Relief fleet lifeboat, previously at Kirkwall. Later at Barry Dock.
1248	17-24	Bon Accord	2000	2000–	Severn	

More post-service details can be found on the respective lifeboat class pages.

==== No. 2 Station (Footdee) ====
ON	Name	Built	On station	Class	Comments
669	Robert and Ellen Robson	1918	1925–1939	34-foot Dungeness self-righting (P&S)	(Note: 34 ft 0 in (10.36 m) x 8 ft 0 in (2.44 m) (10-oared) Dungeness-class (Rubie) self-righting (P&S) lifeboat, legacy of Mr R. Robson, built by S. E. Saunders of Cowes, costing £966 when new.); Previously at Tramore.
827	George and Elizabeth Gow	1939	1939–1943	Liverpool	
669	Robert and Ellen Robson	1918	1943–1947	34-foot Dungeness self-righting (P&S)	Transferred to Whitby.
827	George and Elizabeth Gow	1939	1947–1962	Liverpool	

No. 2 Station closed, 23 April 1962

==== Launch and recovery tractors (Aberdeen No.2) ====
Op.No.	Reg.No.	Type	On station	Comments
T8	AF 4256	Clayton	1925–1938	
T18	PY 7589	Clayton	1938–1939	Stored at Aberdeen, 1939–1942
T33	FYP 356	Case L	1939–1944	
T5	IJ 3424	Clayton	1944–1947	
T33	FYP 356	Case L	1947–1957	
T40	JXR 67	Case LA	1957–1962	

No. 2 Station closed, 23 April 1962

==== Inshore lifeboats ====
Op.No.	Name	On station	Class	Comments
D-168	unnamed	1968–1981	D-class (RFD PB16)	
D-281	Sewing Machine Times	1981–1989	D-class (Zodiac III)	
D-386	Trevor Edwin Jones	1989–1998	D-class (EA16)	
D-536	Margaret II	1998–2008	D-class (EA16)	
D-694	James Bissett Simpson	2008–2018	D-class (IB1)	
D-830	Buoy Woody - 85N	2018–	D-class (IB1)	

== See also ==
- List of RNLI stations
- List of former RNLI stations
- Royal National Lifeboat Institution lifeboats
