= Newburgh Lifeboat Station =

Former RNLI lifeboat station in Aberdeenshire, Scotland

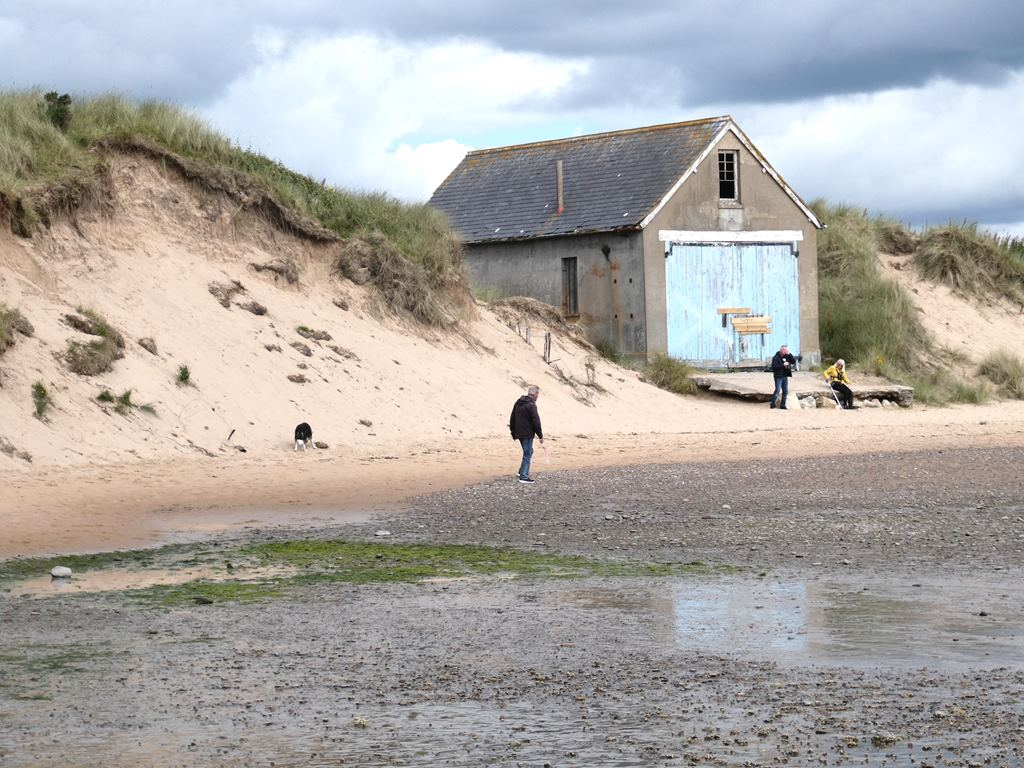
- Former lifeboat station, Newburgh, Aberdeenshire

- Location within Aberdeenshire

General information
- Status: Closed
- Location: The Old Lifeboat House, Ythan Estuary Beach, Newburgh, Aberdeenshire, AB41 6BY, Scotland
- Coordinates: 57°18′46.4″N 1°59′42.8″W
- Opened: 1828–1841 RNIPLS; 1877–1965 RNLI
- Closed: 30 September 1965

Website
- Aberdeen RNLI Lifeboat Station

Newburgh Lifeboat Station was located on the western shore of the River Ythan estuary near Newburgh, a village approximately 14 miles (23 km) north-east of Aberdeen, in the county of Aberdeenshire, on the east coast of Scotland.

A lifeboat was first placed at Newburgh in 1828, by the Royal National Institution for the Preservation of Life from Shipwreck (RNIPLS), but the station closed in 1841. A new station was established at Newburgh in 1877, by the Royal National Lifeboat Institution (RNLI).

Newburgh Lifeboat Station was closed in 1965.

== History ==
In 1828, a lifeboat station was established at Newburgh by the Royal National Institution for the Preservation of Life from Shipwreck (RNIPLS), later to become the RNLI in 1854. A Palmer-class lifeboat, probably 26-foot, rowing 6 oars, was placed at the station. No records of any service have been found, and the station closed in 1841.

At a meeting of the RNLI committee of management on Thursday 3 May 1877, following representation from local residents and from the Inspecting Commander of H.M. Coastguard, and following the report of his visit by RNLI Inspector of Life-boats, Rear-Admiral John R. Ward, it was decided to once again place a lifeboat at Newburgh.

A tender was accepted for the construction of a boathouse, and a 30-foot self-righting 'Pulling and Sailing' (P&S) lifeboat, one with (8) oars and sails, along with its launching carriage, was sent to the station. The expense of the lifeboat, its carriage, and all equipment, was provided from the legacy of the late Miss M. A. Birtwhistle of Cheltenham. At a service of dedication and naming ceremony on 18 November 1877, the lifeboat was named Alexander Charles and William Aird, and launched for a demonstration to the assembled crowd.

Whilst setting up a Haul-off warp prior to exercise on 3 November 1899, in a strong south-west gale, the lifeboat Ellen Newman and John Bentley (ON 255) was swamped, and three crew were washed overboard. Two managed to swim ashore, but one man, the Assistant Coxswain, was seen to be in difficulties by a retired Naval Lieutenant, who swam out, and brought him ashore. Lt. Eustace William Clitherow Stracey, RN (Retd.) was awarded the RNLI Silver Medal.

On 13 October 1923, the Aberdeen fishing trawler Imperial Prince was wrecked off Belhelvie. The Aberdeen Harbour lifeboat (No.2) was launched, but broached as she approached the wreck. Four lifeboat men were washed overboard, but all regained the lifeboat. The Newburgh lifeboat James Stevens No. 19 (ON 459) was pulled 7 miles (11 km) overland to the scene, where with 11 crew from HMS Vampire and HMS Vendetta, both vessels had been at Aberdeen at the time, she was launched four times to the wreck. With assistance from the Peterhead lifeboat, and the Coastguard Rocket Brigade, seven of the nine crew of the trawler were rescued. Two silver medals, and one bronze medal, were awarded for gallantry that day.

At 04:20 on 26 January 1942, the John Ryburn (ON 837) lifeboat crew were called, after reports of flares from a vessel in distress to the north, but it was soon confirmed that a ship was ashore at Cruden Bay, and that the coastguard rocket-brigade were on scene. The lifeboat crew were stood down. A second vessel was then spotted ashore at Hackley Head by assistant mechanic George Whyte, and after confirmation, the lifeboat launched at 08:40, into a strong south-east gale, heading to the SS Lesrix. The lifeboat arrived with the vessel, to find it well ashore with her back broken, with no sign of life, and in a position impossible for the lifeboat to reach. It was decided to head home. About 1 mile (1.6 km) north of the river Ythan, approximately 300 yards (270 m) from the shore, the lifeboat capsized. 15 minutes later, the seven crew were washed onto the beach, but two, crewman James Walker, and asst. mechanic George Whyte, were unconscious and could not be revived.

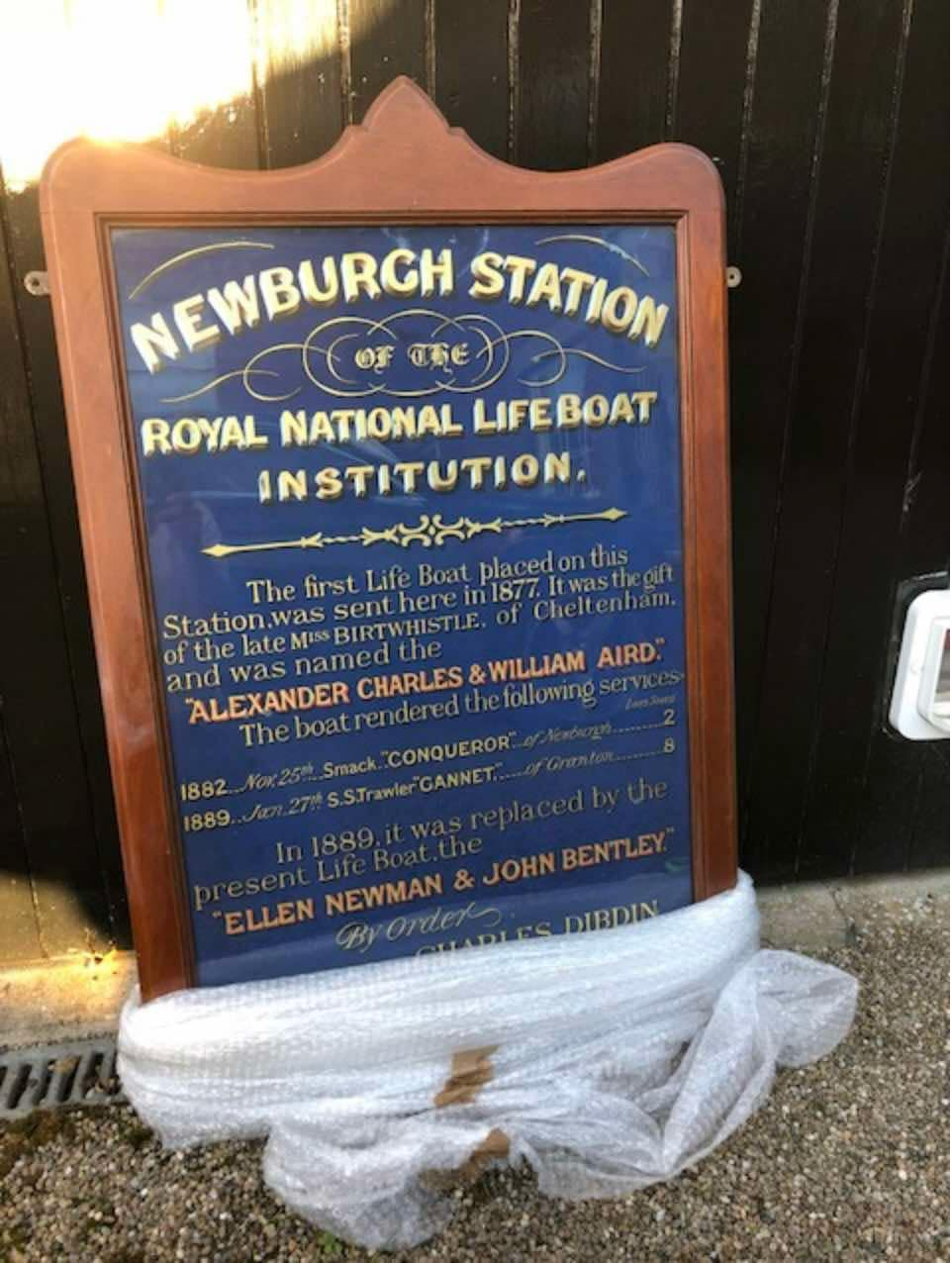
First Newburgh Lifeboat Service Board

By 1965, it had been four years since the last call, and eight years since any lives were saved. With lifeboats stationed to the north at Peterhead, and to the south at Aberdeen, the decision was taken to close Newburgh Lifeboat Station on 30 September 1965.

Since the station reopened in 1877, 155 lives had been saved. The boathouse still stands on the shore at Newburgh. The last lifeboat on station, John Ryburn (ON 837), was sold from service in 1966, and was last reported in 2010 as having been broken up.

In 2018, the original Newburgh service board dating back to 1889, which once resided in the Newburgh lifeboat house, was donated back to the RNLI by lifeboat enthusiast Keith Webb, and presented to the nearest active RNLI station at Aberdeen.

== Station honours ==
The following are awards made at Newburgh.

- RNLI Silver Medal
  Lt. Eustace William Clitherow Stracey, RN (Retd.) – 1899
  John Innes, Coxswain – 1923
  Petty Officer Charles Albert William Essam, RN, HMS Vampire – 1923
- RNLI Bronze Medal
  James Innes, Bowman – 1923
- The Thanks of the Institution inscribed on Vellum
  John Innes, Coxswain – 1923
  Petty Officer Charles Albert William Essam, RN, HMS Vampire – 1923
  James Innes, Bowman – 1923
  11 Naval crewmen of HMS Vampire and HMS Vendetta – 1923
- Letter of Thanks of the Institution
  for the assistance given to the crew of the capsized lifeboat
  William Gall – 1942
  PC W. Gilmour – 1942
  G. Grey, Aux. Coastguard – 1942
  Alexander A. Cruickshank, Honorary Secretary – 1942
  Surgeon Lt. Cmdr. Gerrard, RNVR – 1942
  Dr Martin – 1942
  J. Laing, Aux. Coastguard – 1942

== Roll of honour ==
In memory of those lost whilst serving Newburgh lifeboat.

- Lost when the lifeboat capsized, on service to the steamship Lesrix, 26 January 1942
  George Whyte, Assistant Mechanic
  James Walker, crew member

== Newburgh lifeboats ==
=== Pulling and Sailing (P&S) lifeboats ===
ON (Note: ON is the RNLI's Official Number of the boat.)	Name	Built	On station	Class	Comments
Pre-128	Unnamed	1828	1828–c.1841	Palmer	(Note: ~26-foot Palmer-class lifeboat.)
Station Closed 1841–1877
Pre-621	Alexander Charles and William Aird	1877	1877–1889	30-foot Montrose Self-righting (P&S)	(Note: 30-foot x 8-foot (8-oared) Montrose-class self-righting (P&S) lifeboat, legacy of Mrs M. A. Birtwhistle of Cheltenham, built by Woolfe of Shadwell, London, costing £275.)
255	Ellen Newman and John Bentley	1889	1889–1901	31-foot Self-righting (P&S)	(Note: 31-foot x 7-foot 3in (10-oared) self-righting (P&S) lifeboat, gift of Mr J. Bentley of Camden Town, built by Forrestt of Limehouse, London, costing £310.)
459	James Stevens No. 19	1901	1901–1926	34-foot Dungeness Self-righting (P&S)	(Note: 34-foot x 8-foot (10-oared) Dungeness-class (Rubie) self-righting (P&S) lifeboat, legacy of Mr J. Stevens of Birmingham, built by Thames Ironworks of Blackwall, London, costing £672.)
504	John and Amy	1902	1926–1935	34-foot Dungeness Self-righting (P&S)	(Note: 34-foot x 8-foot (10-oared) Dungeness-class (Rubie) self-righting (P&S) lifeboat, legacy of Mr J. Bayliss of Ryde, built by Thames Ironworks of Blackwall, London, costing £592.); Previously at Hendon Beach.
591	John and Robert C. Mercer	1909	1935–1941	34-foot Dungeness Self-righting (P&S)	(Note: 34-foot x 8-foot (10-oared) Dungeness-class (Rubie) self-righting (P&S) lifeboat, gift of Miss M.Mercer of Clayton-le-Moors built by Thames Ironworks of Blackwall, London.); Previously at Alnmouth.

Pre ON numbers are unofficial numbers used by the Lifeboat Enthusiasts' Society to reference early lifeboats not included on the official RNLI list.

=== Motor lifeboats ===
ON	Name	Built	On station	Class	Comments
837	John Ryburn	1941	1941–1965	32-foot Surf	(Note: 32-foot x 9-foot 3in Surf-class lifeboat, legacy of Mr W. McCunn, with twin 12-hp Weyburn F2 engines, built by Alexander Robertson & Sons of Sandbank, Argyll and Bute, costing £3,791.)

Station Closed in 1928

=== Launch and recovery tractors ===
Op. No. (Note: Op. No. is the RNLI's Operational Number of the boat or vehicle carried on the hull.)	Reg. No.	Type	On station	Comments
T2	AH 5933	Clayton	1924–1930	
T25	UW 3881	FWD Co.	1930–1932	
T5	IJ 3424	Clayton	1932–1944	
T33	FYP 356	Case L	1944–1947	
T5	IJ 3424	Clayton	1947	
T38	HYU 15	Case L	1947–1956	
T34	FYR 552	Case L	1956–1965	

== See also ==
- List of RNLI stations
- List of former RNLI stations
- Royal National Lifeboat Institution lifeboats
