= Alnmouth Lifeboat Station =

Former lifeboat station in Northumberland, England

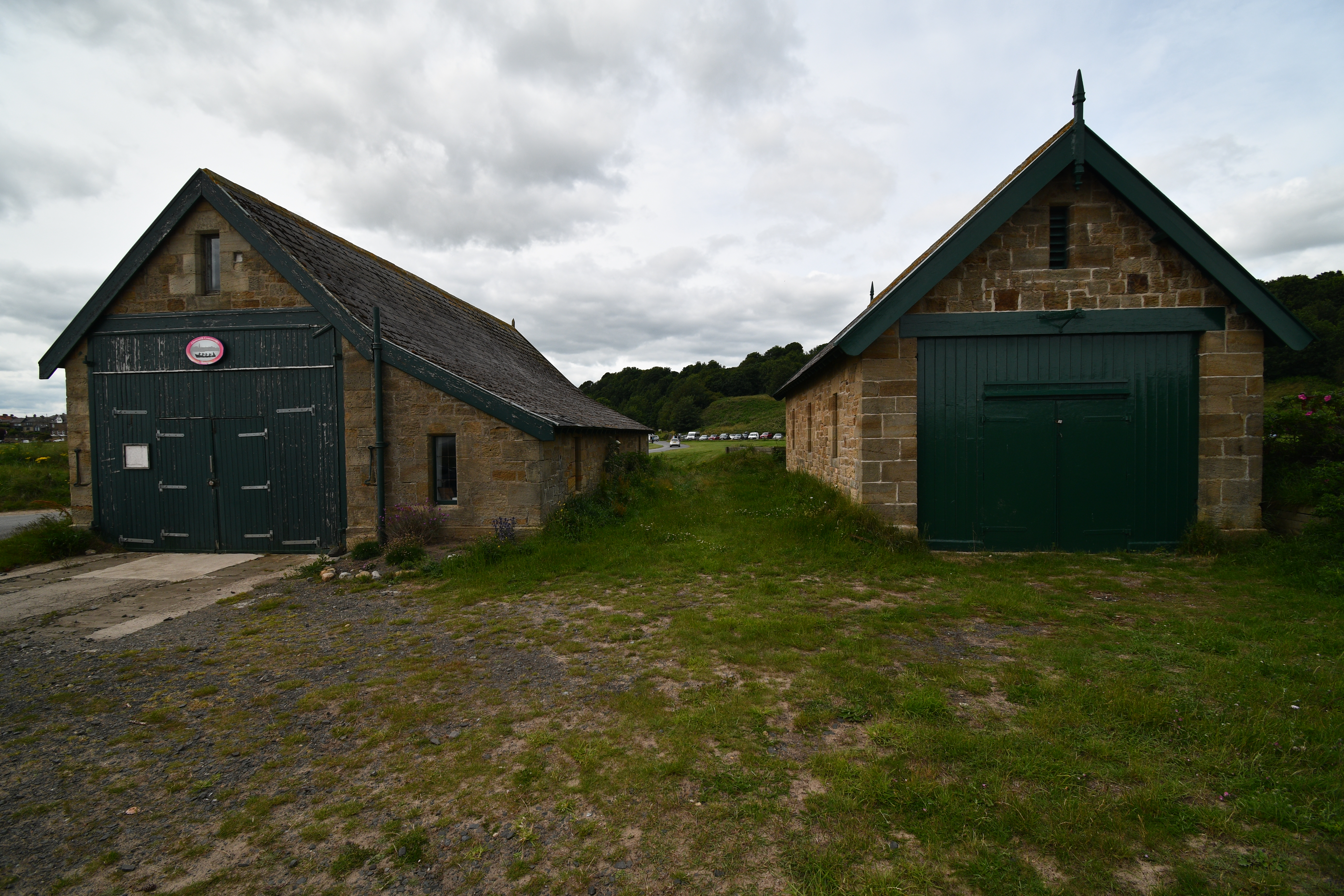
- Alnmouth Lifeboat Houses, now Alnmouth Community Rowing Club.

- Northumberland with Alnmouth Lifeboat Station

General information
- Status: Closed
- Type: RNLI Lifeboat Station
- Location: The Lifeboat Houses, Alnmouth, Alnwick, Northumberland, NE66 3NJ, England
- Coordinates: 55°23′24.3″N 1°36′19.0″W
- Opened: 1854
- Closed: 1935

Alnmouth Lifeboat Station was located next to the Golf Links, north-east of Alnmouth, a village sitting at the mouth of the River Aln, approximate 4.5 miles (7.2 km) south-east of the town of Alnwick, in the county of Northumberland.

A lifeboat was first stationed at Alnmouth by Algernon Percy, 4th Duke of Northumberland. Management of the station was transferred to the Royal National Lifeboat Institution (RNLI) in 1854.

After operating for 81 years, Alnmouth Lifeboat Station was closed in 1935.

== History ==
In 1851, Algernon Percy, 4th Duke of Northumberland, of Alnwick Castle, had been appointed president of the Royal National Institution for the Preservation of Life from Shipwreck (RNIPLS). He set a competition for the design of a Self-righting lifeboat, with the reward of £100, which was won by James Beeching of Great Yarmouth.

Beeching presented a 22-foot version of his boat, named Lucy, to the Duchess of Northumberland, intended for personal use. A boathouse was built on Northumberland's land at Alnmouth, and the boat was delivered in September 1852. However, the boat was then used for lifeboat trials by Capt. John Ross Ward, RN, Inspector of Lifeboats. With a crew of local men, they rowed the boat through the surf, eventually managing to roll the vessel, pitching Capt. Ward into the sea. The boat performed as designed, righting itself, and Capt. Ward was quickly recovered. Many subsequent lifeboats would follow this design. For his efforts, Capt. Ward was awarded the RNIPLS Silver Medal.

With the boat and boathouse already in place, there was effectively a lifeboat station in Alnmouth from 1852. In 1854, the Duke of Northumberland formally transferred the lifeboat and boathouse to the (now renamed) RNLI, thus creating Alnmouth Lifeboat Station. The boat was sent to Forrestt of Limehouse for some modifications, returning in December 1854. A launch carriage was provided in 1856, and a larger boathouse was funded by the Duke and constructed in 1860.

On 12 June 1860, the brig Ann of Blyth, on passage from Memel, Prussia, was anchored in Alnmouth Bay in a south-east gale, when she parted her anchor cables, and was driven ashore. The small 4-oared lifeboat was launched, successfully rescuing the eight crew. The last man had just been brought aboard, when the masts fell, fortunately falling clear of the lifeboat.

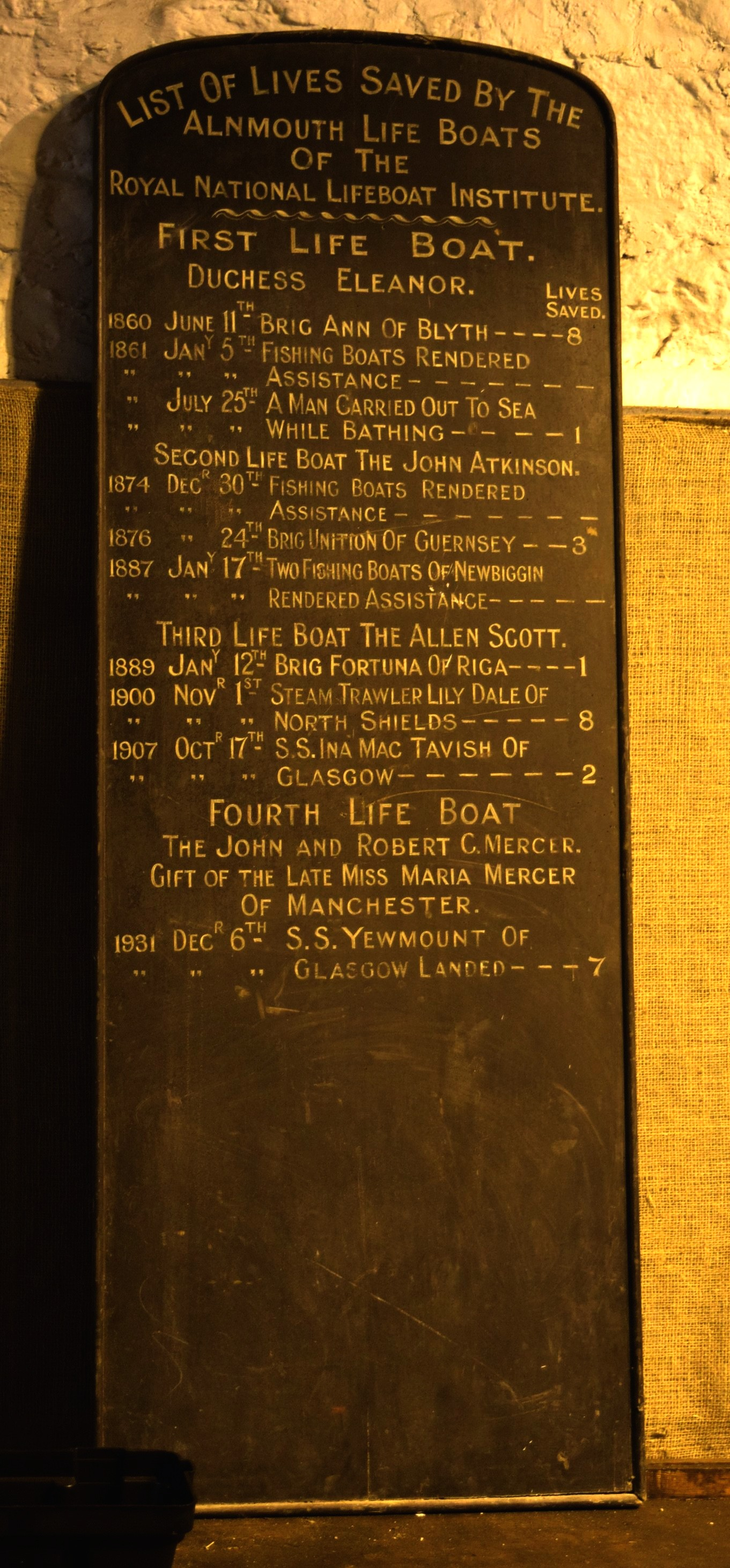
Alnmouth Service Board

In 1865, the RNLI would order a 32-foot 'Pulling and Sailing' (P&S) lifeboat, one with sails and (10) oars, from Forrestt of Limehouse. A gift of £320 from Miss Wardell of Tunbridge Wells funded the boat, which was transported to Alnwick free of charge by the Great Northern and North Eastern Railway Companies, arriving in March 1865. The boat was named John Atkinson.

On 24 December 1876, the brig Unition of Germany stranded on Boulmer Rocks, whilst on passage to Burntisland from London. One man was lost, and four were rescued by the Boulmer Rocket Brigade. The John Atkinson would rescue the remaining three crew.

In 1888, Alnmouth would receive Allen Scott (ON 171), a 34-foot self-righting (P&S) lifeboat costing £329, constructed by Woolfe of Shadwell, and funded from the legacy of Mr T. W. Allen of Newbury, Berkshire. On the 8 January 1889, the brig Fortuna of Riga ran aground on the Berling Carr, on passage from Memel, Germany to the River Tyne. Three crew made it ashore in the ship's boat, and five were rescued by rocket apparatus. Her captain refused to abandon ship, but was rescued 4 days later by the Alnmouth lifeboat. The vessel broke up soon afterwards.

The last lifeboat placed at Alnmouth was in 1909, the 34-foot self-righting Dungeness-class (Rubie) lifeboat, constructed by Thames Ironworks, provided by a gift from Miss Maria Mercer of Clayton-le-Moors in Lancashire, and named John and Robert C. Mercer (ON 591).

It would be another 22 years before the only and final Alnmouth service of the John and Robert C. Mercer. On 6 December 1931, the S.S. Yewmount of Glasgow, on passage from Methil to Treport with a cargo of coal, hit a submerged object off the Longstone Lighthouse. The vessel was run ashore in Alnmouth Bay. The lifeboat stood by for several hours, later returning and landing seven of the 12 crew.

With the lifeboat called just once in 26 years, Alnmouth Lifeboat Station was closed in 1935. In 82 years service, the lifeboats would save 15 lives, and land a further 15 crew. The John and Robert C. Mercer (ON 591) was transferred to Newburgh, serving a further six years. Both the 1852 and 1860 boathouses remain, and are currently used by the Alnmouth Community Rowing Club.

== Alnmouth lifeboats ==
=== Pulling and Sailing (P&S) lifeboats ===
ON (Note: ON is the RNLI's Official Number of the boat.)	Name	Built	On station	Class	Comments
Pre-248	Lucy or Duchess Eleanor	1852	1852−1865	22-foot Beeching Self-righting	(Note: 22-foot x 5-foot 6in (4-oared) Beeching-class self-righting lifeboat, gift of Algernon Percy, 4th Duke of Northumberland, built by James Beeching of Great Yarmouth, modified by Forrestt of Limehouse, London.)
Pre-434	John Atkinson	1865	1865−1888	32-foot Prowse Self-righting (P&S)	(Note: 32-foot x 7-foot 5in (10-oared) Prowse-class self-righting (P&S) lifeboat, gift of Miss Wandell of Tunbridge Wells, built by Forrestt of Limehouse, London, costing £210.)
171	Allen Scott	1888	1888−1909	34-foot Self-righting (P&S)	(Note: 34-foot x 7-foot 6in (10-oared) self-righting (P&S) lifeboat, legacy of Mr T. W. Allen of Newbury, Berkshire, built by Woolfe of Shadwell, London, costing £329.)
591	John and Robert C. Mercer	1909	1909−1935	34-foot Dungeness Self-righting (P&S)	(Note: 34-foot x 8-foot (10-oared) Dungeness-class (Rubie) self-righting (P&S) lifeboat, gift of Miss M. Mercer of Cheltenham, built by Thames Ironworks, of Blackwall, London, costing £757.)

Pre ON numbers are unofficial numbers used by the Lifeboat Enthusiasts' Society,
to reference early lifeboats not included on the official RNLI list.

=== Launch and recovery tractors ===
Op. No. (Note: Op. No. is the RNLI's Operational Number of the boat carried on the hull or vehicle.)	Reg. No.	Type	On station	Comments
T19	TY 2547	Clayton	1930–1935	

== See also ==
- List of RNLI stations
- List of former RNLI stations
- Royal National Lifeboat Institution lifeboats
