= Peter Walters =

British businessman (1931–2023)

Sir Peter Walters
- Born: Peter Ingram Walters; 11 March 1931; Birmingham, England
- Died: 11 July 2023 (aged 92)
- Education: King Edward's School, Birmingham, University of Birmingham

7th Chairman of BP
- In office 1981–1990
- Preceded by: David Steel
- Succeeded by: Robert Horton

Sir Peter Ingram Walters (11 March 1931 – 11 July 2023) was a British businessman. He was the chief executive and chairman of BP. He was born in Birmingham, England, in the family of a police inspector.

In 1949, he left King Edward's School, Birmingham. He gained a bachelor of commerce degree from the University of Birmingham in 1952.

In 1954 he joined British Petroleum. From 1965 to 1967 Walters was vice president of BP North America Inc, and from 1971 to 1980 regional director for the Western Hemisphere, Australasia and the Far East. He became BP's deputy chairman in 1980.

Walters was the chairman of BP from 1981 to 1990. He retired from BP in March 1990. In 1991–1994, he was chairman of Midland Bank. From 1994 to 2000, he was chairman of SmithKline Beecham. He was a deputy chairman of GlaxoSmithKline. Walters was deputy chairman of EMI in 1990–1999 and HSBC in 1992–2001. He was president of the General Council of British Shipping, the Society of Chemical Industry and the Institute for Employment Studies, and has served as a chairman of the governing body of the London Business School, president of the Institute of Directors, president of the Police Foundation, president of the Institute of Business Ethics and a trustee of the Institute of Economic Affairs.

Walters was knighted in 1984. He was awarded the Society of Chemical Industry's Centenal Medal, received honorary fellowships from the Royal Society of Chemistry and the Institution of Chemical Engineers, and the Cadman Medal from the Institute of Petroleum. He received honorary doctorates from Birmingham University and Stirling University, and an honorary fellowship from the London Business School.

Walters died on 11 July 2023, at the age of 92.
