= Alnmouth =

Village in England

Coordinates: 55.3879°N 1.6124°W

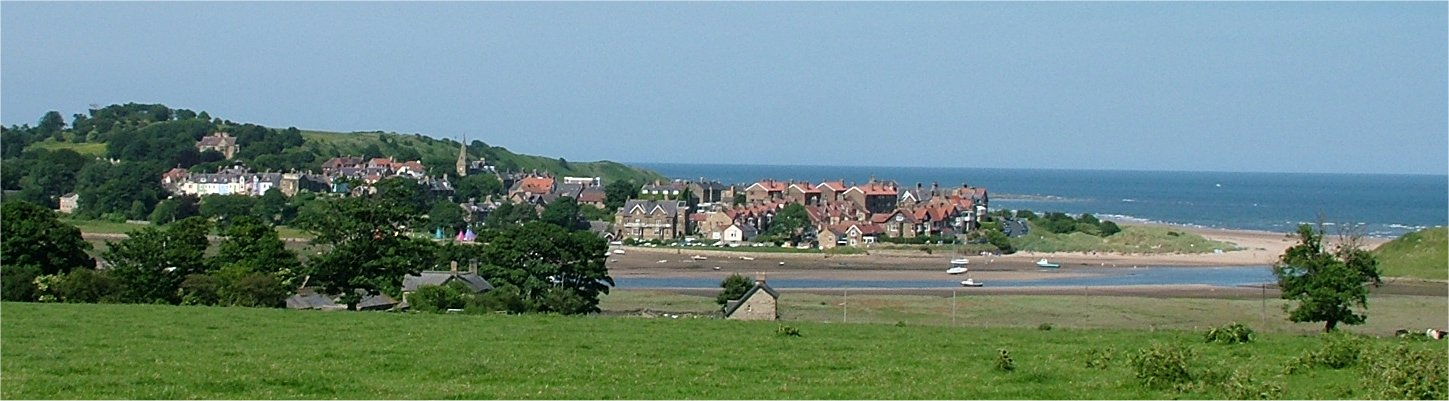
- View of Alnmouth and the estuary of the River Aln

- Location within Northumberland
- Population: 445
- OS grid reference: NU245105
- Unitary authority: Northumberland
- Ceremonial county: Northumberland
- Region: North East
- Country: England
- Sovereign state: United Kingdom
- Post town: ALNWICK
- Postcode district: NE66
- Dialling code: 01665
- Police: Northumbria
- Fire: Northumberland
- Ambulance: North East
- UK Parliament: North Northumberland

Alnmouth (/ˈæl(ə)nmaʊθ/, /jelməθ/) is a coastal village in Northumberland, England, situated 4 miles (6 km) east-south-east of Alnwick. The population of the civil parish at the 2001 Census was 562, reducing to 445 at the 2011 Census.

Located at the mouth of the River Aln, the village had a port supporting a small fishing industry and engaging in national and international trade. It was for a time a leading north-east centre for the export of grain and other foodstuffs, especially to London, and specialised in the import of timber and slate. These activities to some extent shaped the village, as granaries were constructed to store grain, and sawmills and a boatyard established to process wood and build ships.

Port activities declined at the end of the 19th century, partly because of the deterioration of the port due to the shifting and silting of the river estuary and partly because trade transferred to the railways. A notable change in the course of the river during a violent storm in 1806 resulted in the loss of the remains of the village's original church and disruption to the functioning of the port and industries.

With the landing of new railways, Alnmouth has transformed into a coastal resort with one of the earliest English golf courses, a holiday camp, bathing houses, beach huts, and sea-view villas. Alnmouth is now a coastal resort and tourist attraction in the Northumberland Coast.

== History ==
=== Establishment and early history ===
Alnmouth was established as a village by William de Vesci, who was granted a charter in 1152 to hold court and establish a settlement on a 296-acre (120 ha) spit of land in the manor of Lesbury. Eustace de Vesci was granted royal permission to establish a port and a Wednesday fish market in 1207 or 1208.

What preceded the Norman village is less clear, although land at the mouth of the river is likely to have been used throughout antiquity, coastal plains being some of the first areas of recorded human settlement in Britain. A few flint tools from the Mesolithic period have been found, but no evidence has been found for the Neolithic period. A number of Bronze Age remains have been found including cist burials and a spear-head; and a presumed enclosure at the very north of the village is conjectured to be an Iron Age feature.

No Roman remains have been discovered, but it appears likely that the estuary was known and presumably used by the Romans. Ptolemy, writing in the 2nd century CE, notes the river Alaunus, and the much later Ravenna Cosmography notes a place-name of Alauna. Alnmouth harbour would have been useful to the Romans, both to support military campaigns and to facilitate trade, albeit the river is not navigable beyond Lesbury, 3.2 kilometres (2.0 mi) upstream.

There is speculation that Adtwifyrdi or Adtuifyrdi ('at the two fords'), the name used by the Venerable Bede, refers to the estuary of the River Aln. Here, according to Bede's account in Historia ecclesiastica gentis Anglorum, Book IV, ch. 28, Archbishop Theodore presided over a synod in 684 in the presence of King Ecgfrith of Northumbria, at which bishop Tunberht of Hexham was deposed and St Cuthbert elected Bishop of Lindisfarne. The name Alnmouth derives from the Old English mūþa ('mouth of river').

=== Port ===
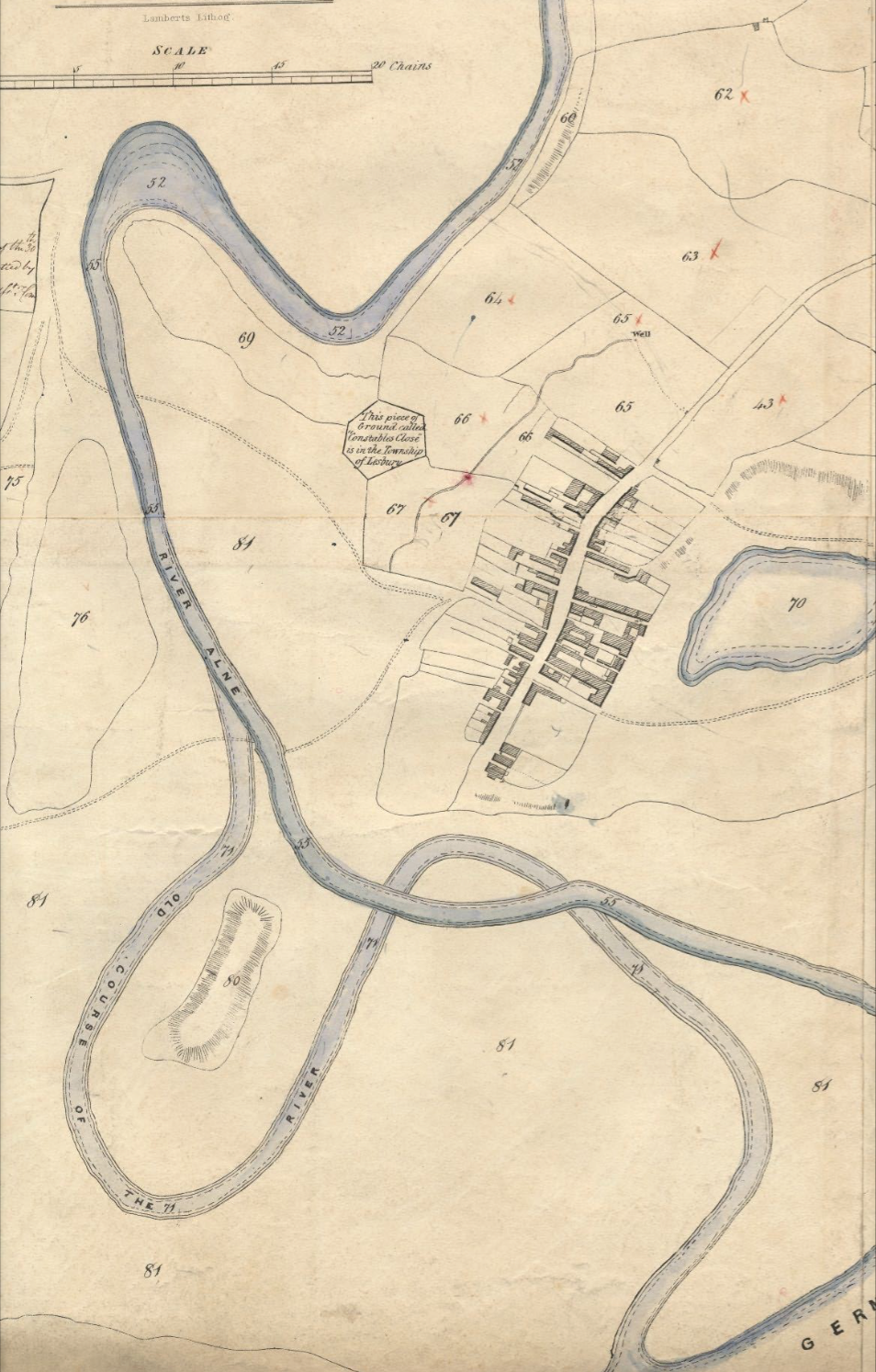
Tithe map of Alnmouth from 1843, showing the changed course of the River Aln after a storm in 1806 diverted it from an oxbow meander to a straighter course

Alnmouth's port, engaging in fishing and trade, has had a fitful 800-year documented history. The village was attacked and greatly depleted by the Scots in 1336. Further depredations were caused by the Black Death in 1348. The village was described as "depeopled" in 1597. A 1614 survey notes that the village was "in great ruin and decay", albeit somewhat improved. A 1567 survey established that 20 of the 60 households in Alnmouth were engaged in fishing.

Prosperity seems to have improved in the 17th century, and in the 18th century trade as the port burgeoned. The most notable export from the port was grain. A major import of the time was guano from Peru, part of the larger pattern of agricultural improvement of the time. Other exports noted in this period are coal, and eggs, pork and pickled salmon for the London trade, and wool for the Yorkshire woolen industry. Imports mentioned include blue slate from Scotland and timber from Holland and Scandinavia. The grain trade gave rise to 16 granaries in the village, some of which were much later converted to residential use.

The port also prospered as a shipbuilding centre, albeit on a modest scale. At its peak, around 1750, up to 18 vessels might be seen in the harbour at any one time. The reputation of the village was not high, though. John Wesley is famously reported to have described the place as "a small sea-port town, famous for all kinds of wickedness", and much earlier accounts speak of members of the community who added nothing to the commonwealth, and against whom all things must be secured lest they be stolen.

The American privateer John Paul Jones attacked the port in 1779, during the War of Independence, firing his cannon at the church.

A shift in the course of the river on Christmas Day 1806 was sometimes identified as a cause of the decline of the port. A violent storm breached the northern end of the Church Hill sandbank, allowing the river to divert away from a south–north meander to take a more direct course to the sea. The 19th century saw a decline in traffic at the port, falling off completely at the end of the century.

James Beeching's award-winning model lifeboat was presented to Algernon Percy, 4th Duke of Northumberland and brought to Alnmouth in 1852. It was transferred to the Royal National Lifeboat Institution in 1854 and a new boathouse was provided in 1860. Alnmouth Lifeboat Station was closed in 1935.

=== Resort ===
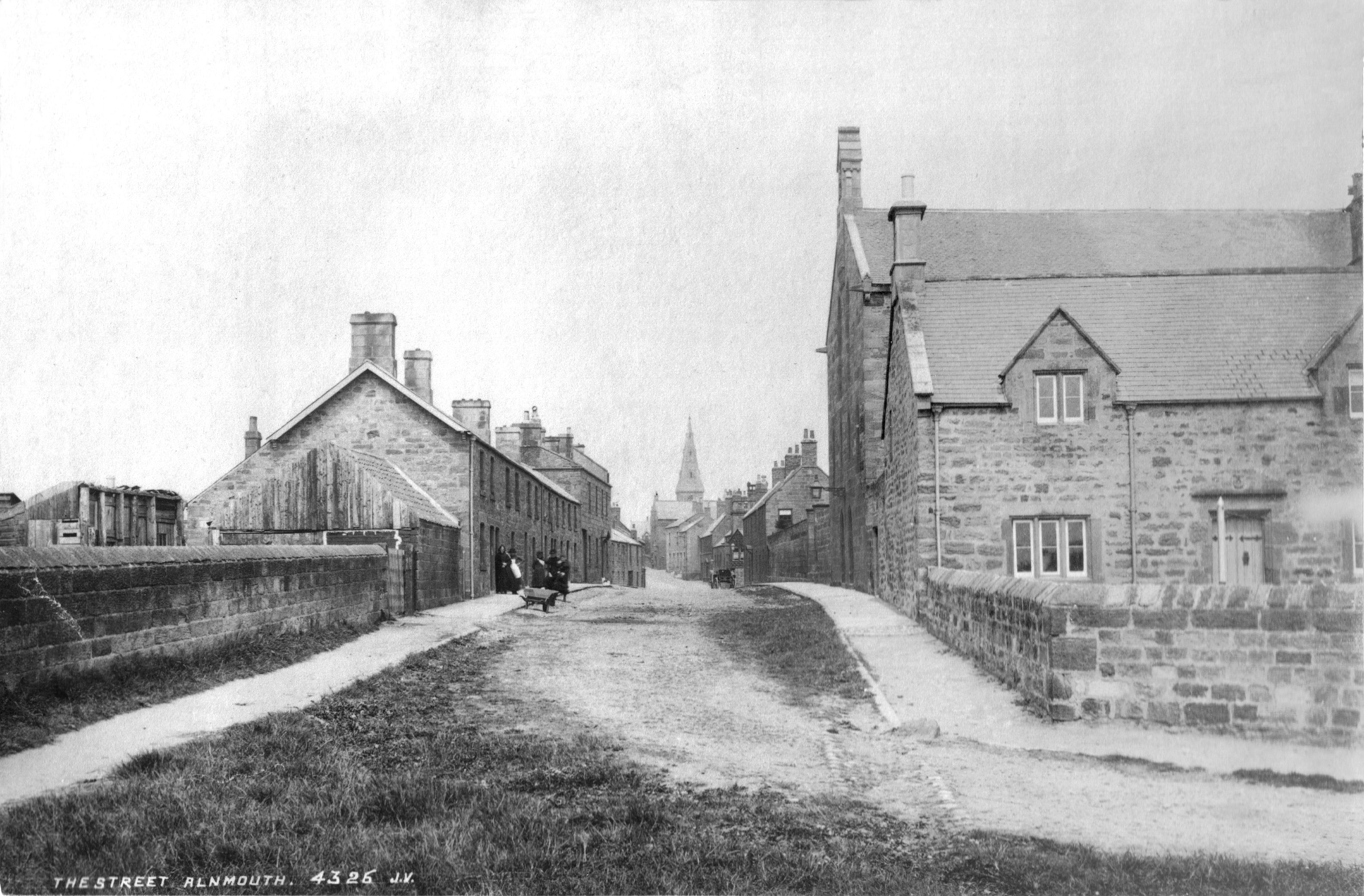
Alnmouth's Northumberland Street in the late 19th century.

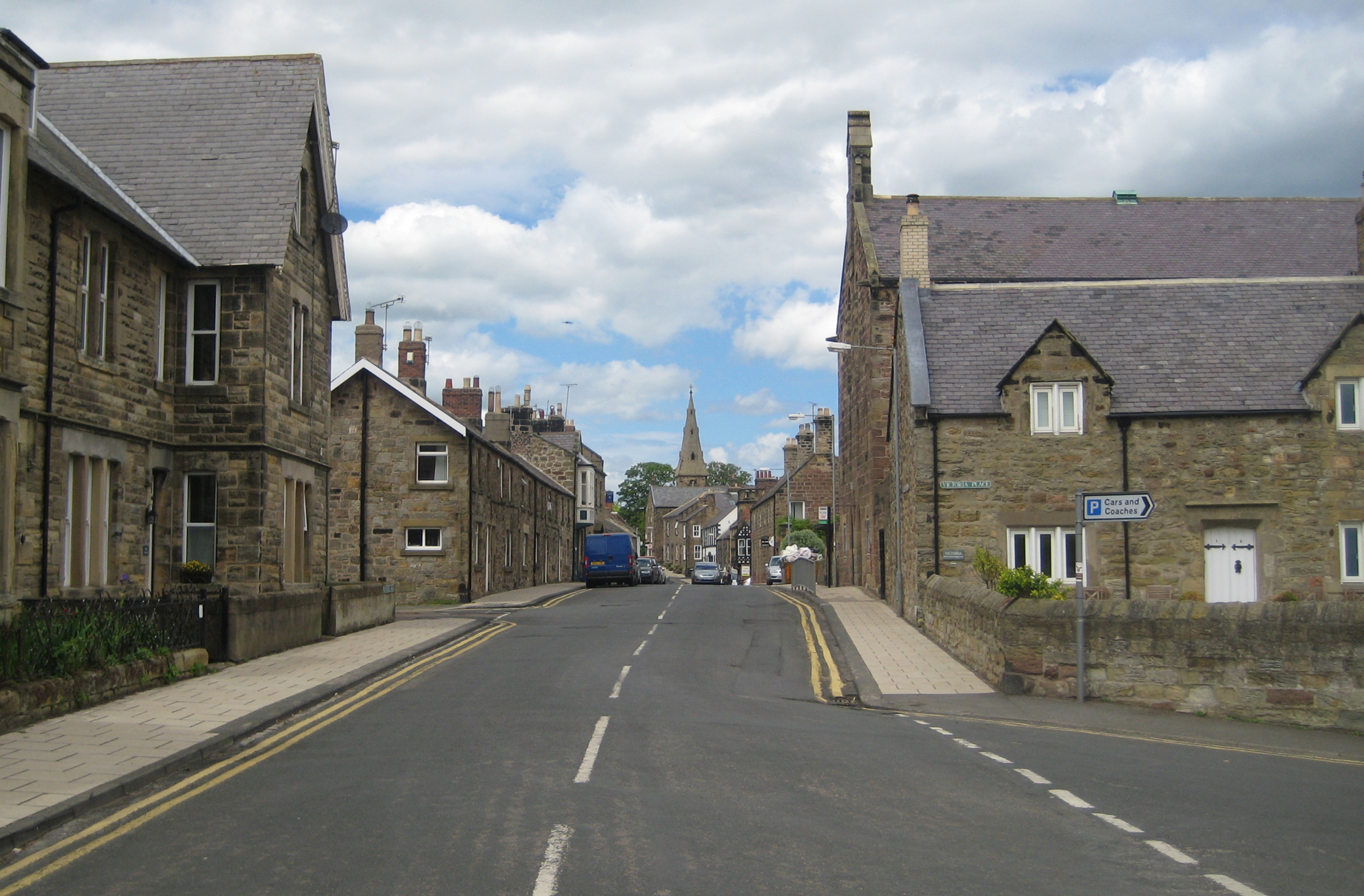
The same view in 2013.

The effects of the port's decline were offset by a new role for the village, as a holiday and second-home resort. With the coming of the railway to nearby Hipsburn in 1847 (the station known then as Bilton junction, then Alnmouth, and now Alnmouth for Alnwick), spacious villas with sea-views were built, granary buildings converted to residential use or demolished to make way for new cottages. Maps of 1897 show a holiday camp, garden tea-room and many beach-huts amongst the dunes. Heated baths were available by the village's gas station. A links golf course was established in 1869, the fourth oldest in England; it is believed that it was designed by Mungo Park who became the club's first professional.

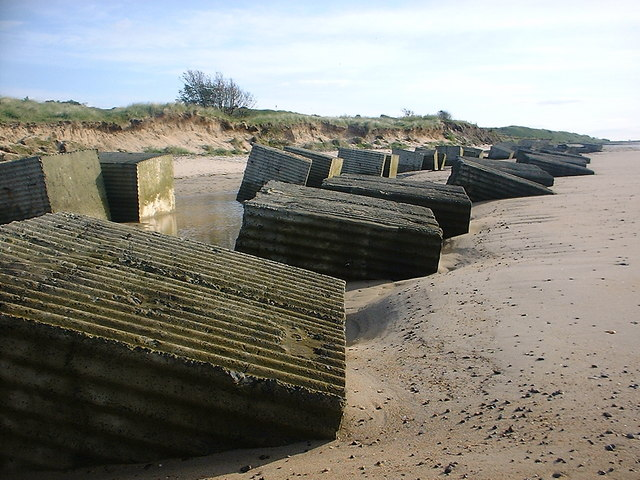
Two lines of WW2 anti-tank cubes defend Alnmouth's north beach

The early 19th century had seen trade at the port affected by the Napoleonic Wars and fear of French invasion persisted until late in the century. The Duke of Northumberland maintained an army, the Percy volunteers, against the threat, and a gun battery was installed overlooking Alnmouth in 1852. Similar invasion fears arose during World War II, and a variety of defences were installed on the south and north beaches at Alnmouth, including concrete anti-tank cubes, an anti-tank ditch, pill-boxes, reinforcement of the previous century's gun battery, and firing slits built into the walls of the Church Hill guano shed. Remains of many of these defences are evident today.

Alnmouth was rated as among the "20 most beautiful villages in the UK and Ireland" by Condé Nast Traveler in 2020. The publication strongly recommended a "pilgrimage to Alnwick Castle". The Northumberland Guide states that the village "well worth exploring", with its "almost picture postcard perfect with its colourful cottages".

== Geography ==
Alnmouth is a village on the north-east coast of England, some 29 miles (47 km) due north of Newcastle upon Tyne, 31 miles (50 km) south-south-east of Berwick Upon Tweed, and 4.1 miles (6.6 km) to the east-south-east of Alnwick. The village is built on a promontory on a spit of land bordered to the east by the North Sea and to the south and west by the estuary of the River Aln, falling from around 17.2 metres (56 ft) above Mean High Water level at the north of the village to 3.5 metres (11 ft) in the south-west.

The geology of the North East of England around Alnmouth is a superficial layer of glacial till in the form of boulder clay lying on often outcropping Whin Sill, a carboniferous limestone, with peat deposits, and, at the coast, wind-blown sand including a coastline dune system which has evolved over the last 10,000 years. The coastline of the county is a series of headlands and bays — such as at Alnmouth — with wide, sandy beaches, the result of differential erosion of ice-age deposits. Alnmouth's south-beach dune is calcareous, containing mainly marine-animal shell, and is only 2–300 years old.

Alnmouth lies at the south-east extent of low hills such run down from the Cheviot Hills to the coast. Its hinterland is an open agricultural landscape of arable land and pasture, with broadleaf woodlands in river valleys such as of the Aln, and some forestry plantations. Its history is of medieval tree-clearance and the establishment of scattered settlements and farms with complex field patterns.

Alnmouth's coastline has multiple protected area designations. It lies at the southern end of the Northumberland Coast Area of Outstanding Natural Beauty and the (non-statutory) Northumberland Heritage Coast, both of which seek to protect its landscape in all aspects. The saltflats of the estuary and the south beach dune are a Site of Special Scientific Interest listed in 1988 as Alnmouth Saltmarsh and Dunes for its varied plant community. As part of the Environment Agency's Northumberland 4shores Project, in 2006, flood banks protecting 20 acres (8.1 ha) of estuarine pasture were breached and shallow ponds created, to allow tidal action to recreate saltflats to provide habitats for wading birds, dissipate wave energy, and diminish the potential for flooding. The golf course area, north of the village, is registered as common land.

Most of the village was designated as a conservation area in 1972 — areas of recent building in the north are excluded. The architecture of the town is a mix of a few 17th-century structures with 18th- and 19th-century buildings, ranging from terraced cottages to spacious Victorian villas, some flamboyant in style; 31 are Grade II listed. South of the river, a roofless 1870s mortuary chapel and the remains of a concrete cottage stand on the south-west of Church Hill. Further south, the first edition Ordnance Survey map of the area shows a bathhouse on Buston links associated with 'sandpits' — apparently bathing holes — drilled into the outcropping stone on the beach, and presumably evidence of the Victorian Spa movement.

== Transport ==
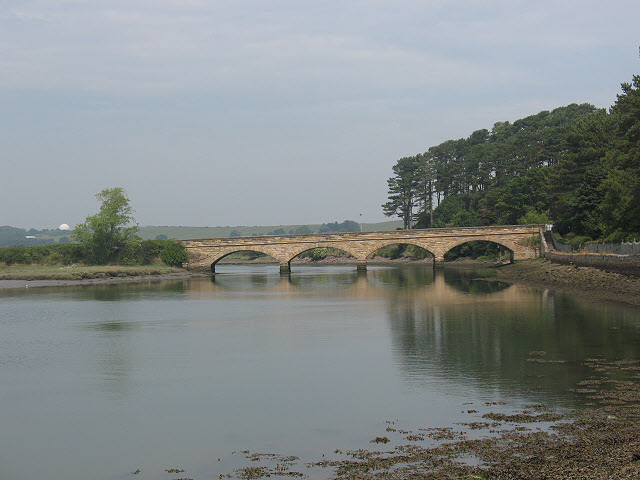
The 1856 Duchess's Bridge, providing a direct dry link between Alnmouth and Hipsburn and its 1847 railway station

Alnmouth is served by Alnmouth railway station which is situated in Hipsburn, a mile inland to the west. It is on the X18 bus route from Berwick via Alnwick and Amble to Newcastle.

Two roads serve access to the village. The east-west B1336 runs from the north of Alnmouth to Hipsburn, providing a connection to the A1068 Alnwick-Ashington road. This link was developed in 1856 when the Hipsburn bridge crossing the River Aln was constructed to support a direct connection with the new railway station. The bridge was renamed The Duchess's Bridge in 1864. A second more ancient road exits the village to the north, following contours above the north bank of the Aln, to Lesbury and the coast northwards of Alnmouth.

Prior to the bridge, the river was crossed by mettled and kerbstoned fords at two points; one, High Ford, was due west of the centre of the village, leading in the direction of Hipsburn and Alnwick; and a second, Low Ford, was to the south-west of the village and north-west of Church Hill, leading in the direction of High Buston and Warkworth, and adjacent to stepping-stones across the river usable at low tide.

The village is on National Cycle Route 1.

== Notable people ==
- Arthur Campbell-Walker founded Alnmouth Golf Club.
- Val McDermid, crime writer, lived in Alnmouth for a period.
