= Hendon Beach Lifeboat Station =

Former lifeboat station in Tyne and Wear, England

Sunderland (Hendon Beach) Lifeboat Station

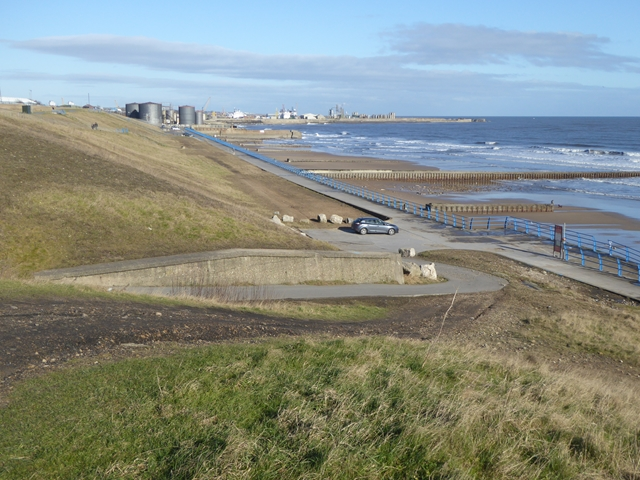
- Site of Hendon Beach Lifeboat Station

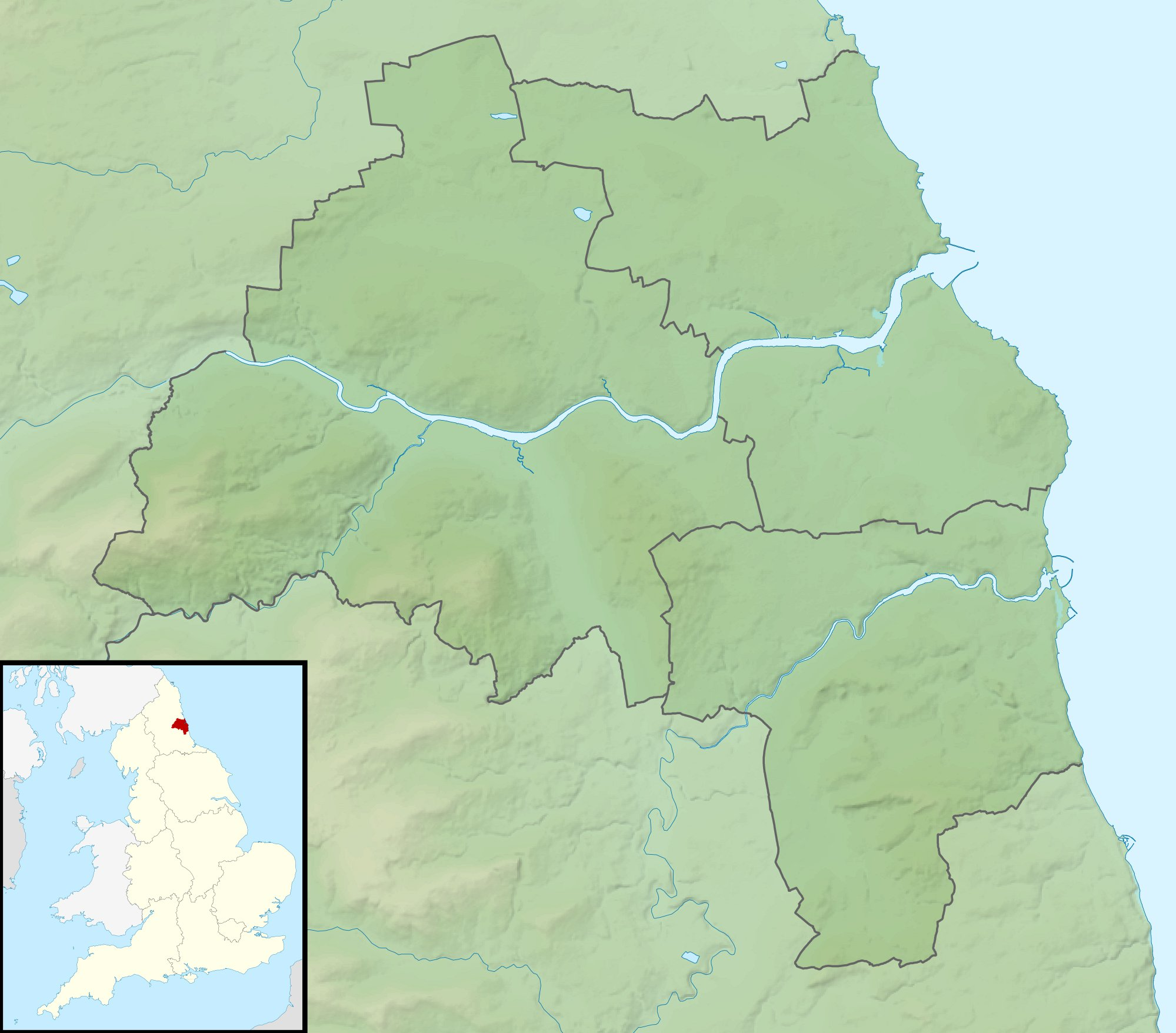
- Hendon Beach, Tyne and Wear

General information
- Status: Closed
- Type: RNLI Lifeboat Station
- Location: Halfway House Lane, Hendon, Sunderland, Tyne and Wear,, England
- Coordinates: 54°53′19.6″N 1°21′39.9″W
- Opened: 1902
- Closed: 1912

Sunderland (Hendon Beach) Lifeboat Station was located on the coast between the Wearside and Grangetown areas of Sunderland, in the county of Tyne and Wear.

A lifeboat was first stationed at Hendon Beach in 1902, by the Royal National Lifeboat Institution (RNLI).

After just 10 years in operation, Hendon Beach Lifeboat Station was closed on 11 July 1912.

== History ==
The Great Storm of 1901 is well documented. This violent storm caused devastation along the North Sea coasts of Scotland and England, and in a period of 4 days between 12 and 15 November 1901, over 40 vessels were lost, claiming over 200 lives. Nine men of the Caister Lifeboat were lost in the 1901 Caister lifeboat disaster.

On passage from Nantes to North Shields, the full-rigged French vessel Quillota was wrecked at Ryhope Point, Hendon Beach, with the loss of 16 crew.

In 1895, Coxswain John Davison and the crew of Sunderland (South Outlet) lifeboat station suggested a new station at Hendon Beach, as in certain conditions, they had great trouble trying to launch. Although discussed by the RNLI, no action was taken, Following the wreck of the Quillota, discussions resumed regarding the placement of a lifeboat at Hendon Beach, which this time was agreed. A boathouse was constructed at the end of Halfway House Lane, located close to the site of the Hendon Paper Works, costing £430. A 34-foot self-righting 'Pulling and Sailing' (P&S) lifeboat, one with oars and sails, and costing £592, was constructed by Thames Ironworks, arriving on station on 15 December 1902. If required on service, she would be operated by the crew from the Sunderland 'South Station'. Funded from the legacy of Mr J. Bayliss of Ryde, Isle of Wight, at a ceremony on 7 January 1903, she was named John and Amy (ON 504).

It would be nearly six years before the boat was called. On 19 October, John and Amy was launched at 10:00 to the steamship Abasoto, on passage from Algiers to Tynemouth, carrying 2500 tons of iron ore. Under the command of Captain Learete, with a crew of twenty four on board, and attempting to shelter from rough conditions, the vessel ran aground on Whitestones Reef, south-east of Sunderland. As it turned out, the lifeboat wasn't required, and returned to station by 15:00.

This would turn out to be the only service for the lifeboat. With a motor lifeboat, J. McConnell Hussey (ON 343), an older boat but with an engine conversion, placed at Sunderland in 1911, it was decided in July 1912 to close the Hendon Beach Lifeboat Station, officially closing on 2 October 1912.

The Hendon Beach lifeboat John and Amy (ON 504) was transferred to the Relief fleet, and then would see service at Newburgh between 1926 and 1935. No evidence remains of the Hendon Beach boathouse.

== Hendon Beach lifeboat ==
ON (Note: ON is the RNLI's Official Number of the boat.)	Name	Built	On service	Class	Comments
504	John and Amy	1902	1902−1912	34-foot Dungeness Self-righting (P&S)	(Note: 34-foot x 8-foot (10-oared) Dungeness-class (Rubie) self-righting (P&S) lifeboat, legacy of Mr J. Bayliss of Ryde, built by Thames Ironworks of Blackwall, London, costing £592.)

== See also ==
- List of RNLI stations
- List of former RNLI stations
- Royal National Lifeboat Institution lifeboats
