= Surf-class lifeboat =

Former RNLI lifeboat class

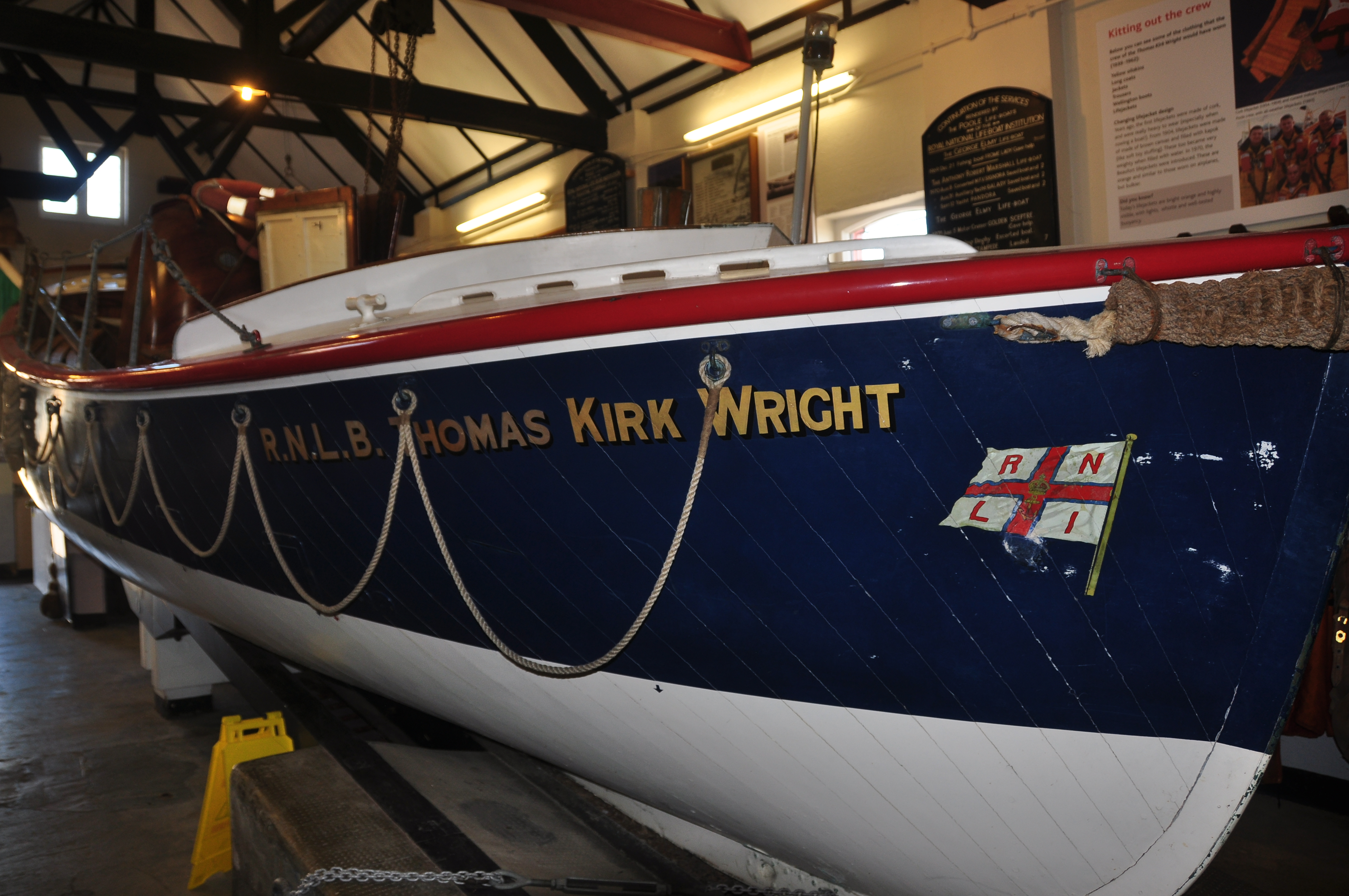
- RNLB Thomas Kirk Wright (ON 811) in Poole Lifeboat Museum

Class overview
- Name: Surf-class
- Builders: J. Samuel White of Cowes; Groves & Guttridge of Cowes; Alexander Robertson & Sons of Sandbank, Argyll
- Operators: Royal National Lifeboat Institution
- Cost: £3,000-£3,800
- Built: 1936–1941
- In service: 1936–1965
- Completed: 9
- Retired: 9

General characteristics
- Displacement: 4-5 tons
- Length: 32 ft (9.8 m)
- Beam: 9 ft (2.74 m)-9 ft 3 in (2.82 m)
- Propulsion: 2 x 12 bhp Weyburn F2 2-cyl. petrol
- Speed: 6.5–7.5 knots (7.5–8.5 mph; 12–14 km/h)
- Range: ~40 nautical miles (45 mi; 75 km)

The Surf-class was a light non-self-righting displacement hull motor lifeboat. Nine were built between 1936 and 1941, and operated by the Royal National Lifeboat Institution (RNLI) between 1936 and 1965.

== History ==
Designed by RNLI Naval Architect James Rennie Barnett, the Surf-class was the smallest and lightest offshore motor lifeboat produced by the Institution. Intended for stations where launching heavier boats would be difficult, the Surf-class enabled the RNLI to replace traditional 'Pulling and Sailing' (P&S) lifeboats, ones with sails and oars, and plug gaps in motor lifeboat cover. The boats however, were only really suitable for inshore work in moderate conditions and only had long service lives at two stations.

== Description ==
The first two boats were 32 ft (9.8 m) long, with a 9 ft (2.7 m) beam. No shelter was provided on the deck, as this was not considered to be a problem for the kind of services that they were intended for. On service, with crew and gear on board, the boat weighed just 4 1/4 tons. Each boat was divided into five water-tight compartments, with approximately ninety air-cases.

Power was provided by two 12-hp 2-cylinder Weyburn F2 horizontal petrol engines, each being water-tight, and capable of operating submerged, although they were also housed in a water-tight engine room.

The first two boats differed in their method of propulsion, the first being fitted with regular twin-screw propellers, whilst the second employed a water-jet propulsion method. The 'Hotchkiss Internal Cones' consisted of a pair of impellers in a conical case, driven by each engine, and working like a centrifugal pump, drawing in water at one end, and forcing it out under pressure at the other. This is a development of the method of hydraulic propulsion used in the early steam-powered life-boats built in 1888. While this was a benefit in shallow waters, the cone powered boat was approximately 1 knot (2 km/h; 1 mph) slower than the screw version.

The first two boats served for less than ten years, before being sold to the Dutch Lifeboat Service KNZHRM in June 1946.

Construction of the next seven boats in the class began in 1938, three years after the first two, all fitted with a shelter ahead of the (tiller) steering position, and built with a slightly wider beam of 9 ft 3 in (2.82 m). Each continued to employ the twin Weyburn F2 engines, and all but one featured Hotchkiss Internal Cone propulsion. Kate Greatorex (ON 816) was fitted with Gill water jets.

== Service ==
These boats served for 10 to 12 years at most of their stations, before being replaced by standard carriage launched boats, but at two locations, Poole and Newburgh, Surf-class boats continued into the sixties. RNLB John Ryburn (ON 837) was withdrawn from service at Newburgh at the end of September 1965, after more than twenty-four years on station. During this time, the lifeboat was launched on service only eleven times, but rescued 19 lives. Newburgh lifeboat station was closed when the boat was withdrawn. Norman Nasmyth (ON 836) remained in the Relief fleet until 1966.

== Fleet ==
ON (Note: ON is the RNLI's Official Number of the boat.)	Name	Built	In service	Station	Comments
779	Rosabella	1935	1936–1945	Ilfracombe	(Note: 32 ft (9.8 m) x 9 ft (2.7 m) Surf-class lifeboat, legacy of Mr J. Hogg, built by J. Samuel White of Cowes, driven by std. propellers, costing £3,265.); Sold to the Dutch Lifeboat Service KNZHRM, June 1946. See below:–
780	Royal Silver Jubilee 1910-1935	1935	1936–1945	Wells	(Note: 32 ft (9.8 m) x 9 ft (2.7 m) Surf-class lifeboat, gift of Mrs E. W. Montford, JP, built by Groves and Guttridge of Cowes, costing £2,919.); Sold to the Dutch Lifeboat Service KNZHRM, June 1946. See below:–
810	Augustus and Laura	1938	1938–1950	Newbiggin	(Note: 32 ft (9.8 m) x 9 ft 3 in (2.82 m) Surf-class lifeboat, gift of Miss E. A. Northey, built by Groves and Guttridge of Cowes, costing £3,356.) Sold 1950. Renamed Betsy Lyn. Fishing boat, destroyed at Ouseburn Quay, Newcastle upon Tyne, November 1995.
811	Thomas Kirk Wright	1938	1939–1962	Poole	(Note: 32 ft (9.8 m) x 9 ft 3 in (2.82 m) Surf-class lifeboat, legacy of Mr T. Kirk Wright, built by Groves and Guttridge of Cowes, costing £3,337.) Sold 1963. On display at the Poole Lifeboat Museum in Poole, Dorset.
816	Kate Greatorex	1939	1939–1951	Minehead	(Note: 32 ft (9.8 m) x 9 ft 3 in (2.82 m) Surf-class lifeboat, legacy of Mrs K. Greatorex, built by Groves and Guttridge of Cowes, costing £3,478.) Sold March 1952. Stored for restoration ay Yonne (river), Migennes, France, December 2024.
817	Laurence Arden, Stockport	1939	1939–1949	Barmouth	(Note: 32 ft (9.8 m) x 9 ft 3 in (2.82 m) Surf-class lifeboat, legacy of Mrs M. A. Ardern, built by Groves and Guttridge of Cowes, costing £3,492.) Sold December 1951. Renamed The Lady Godiva, later Godiva II. Last reported at Saundersfoot, 1970s.
817	Laurence Arden, Stockport	1939	1949–1951	Relief fleet	Sold December 1951. Renamed The Lady Godiva, later Godiva II. Last reported at Saundersfoot, 1970s.
835	The Gordon Warren	1939	1939–1949	Rhyl	(Note: 32 ft (9.8 m) x 9 ft 3 in (2.82 m) Surf-class lifeboat, legacy of Mr H. B. G. Warren, built by J. Samuel White of Cowes, costing £3,702.) Sold January 1952. Renamed Welsh Maid (CO 332). Fishing boat with wheelhouse fitted, at Conwy, April 2024.
835	The Gordon Warren	1939	1949–1951	Relief fleet	Sold January 1952. Renamed Welsh Maid (CO 332). Fishing boat with wheelhouse fitted, at Conwy, April 2024.
836	Norman Nasmyth	1940	1940–1950	Montrose No.2	(Note: 32 ft (9.8 m) x 9 ft 3 in (2.82 m) Surf-class lifeboat, legacy of Mr N. J. Nasmyth, built by Alexander Robertson & Sons of Sandbank, Argyll, costing £3,690.) Sold 1966. Renamed Montrose, last reported at Lamlash, Isle of Arran, June 1986.
836	Norman Nasmyth	1940	1950–1966	Reserve fleet	Sold 1966. Renamed Montrose, last reported at Lamlash, Isle of Arran, June 1986.
837	John Ryburn	1941	1941–1965	Newburgh	(Note: 32 ft (9.8 m) x 9 ft 3 in (2.82 m) Surf-class lifeboat, legacy of Mr W. McCunn, built by Alexander Robertson & Sons of Sandbank, Argyll, costing £3,791.); Capsized on service, with two crew lost, 26 January 1942. Sold 1966, now believed to have been broken up, 2010.

== Dutch Lifeboat Service KNZHRM ==
RNLI ON (Note: ON is the RNLI's Official Number of the boat.)	Name	Built	In service	Station	Comments
779	Rosabella	1935	1946–1955	Terschelling	Now restored, at Haarlem, NL, July 2024.
780	Rosilee	1935	1946–1959	Vlieland	Sold 1959.

== See also ==
- Royal National Lifeboat Institution lifeboats
