= Barmouth Lifeboat Station =

RNLI lifeboat station in Gwynedd, Wales

- Gorsaf Bad Achub Abermaw

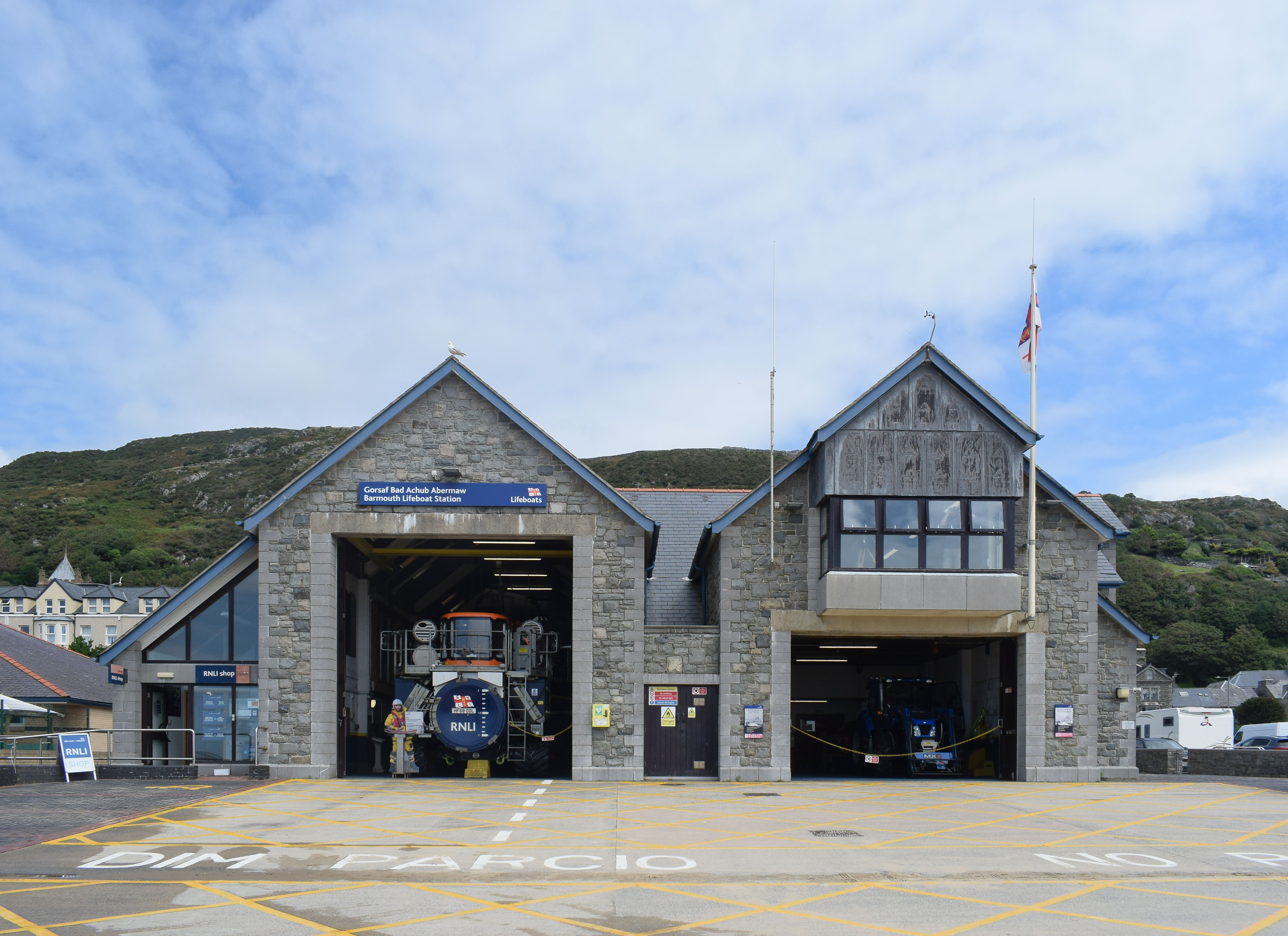
- Barmouth Lifeboat Station in 2025

- Location within Gwynedd

General information
- Type: RNLI Lifeboat Station
- Location: The Promenade,, Barmouth, Gwynedd, Wales, LL42 1NF, United Kingdom
- Coordinates: 52.720955°N 4.055815°W
- Opened: 1828
- Owner: Royal National Lifeboat Institution

Website
- Barmouth RNLI Lifeboat Station

Barmouth Lifeboat Station (Welsh: Gorsaf Bad Achub Abermaw) is located on the Promenade in Barmouth, a town at the mouth of the Afon Mawddach in Gwynedd, Wales.

A lifeboat was first provided to Barmouth by the Royal National Institute for the Preservation of Life from Shipwreck (RNIPLS) in 1828, operated by the Harbour Trust until 1851. The station was re-established in 1853 by the RNIPLS, which became the Royal National Lifeboat Institution (RNLI) in 1854.

The station currently operates 13-30 Ella Larsen (ON 1337), a Shannon-class All-weather lifeboat, on station since 2019, and Craig Steadman (D-814), a D-class (IB1) Inshore lifeboat, on station since 2017.

== History ==
Following a request by the Rev. Frederick Ricketts, a lifeboat was provided to the town by the RNIPLS in 1828. The first lifeboat was a 26 ft (7.9 m) six-oared Palmer type, which arrived aboard the sloop Dove on 25 October 1828. The unnamed boat was operated by the Harbour Trust until 1851.

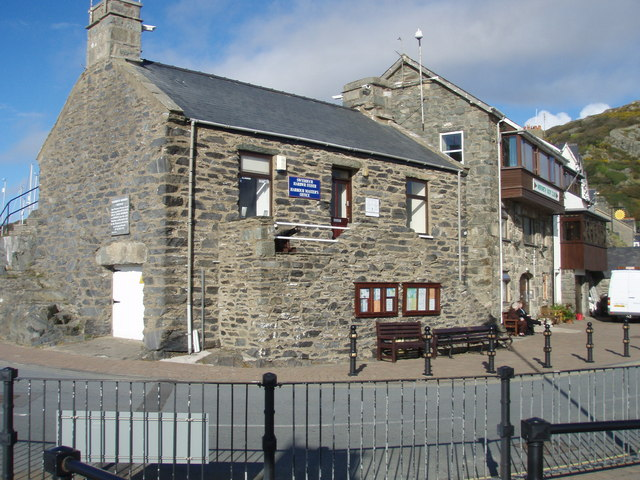
Barmouth Harbour Master's Office

Local funding provided the first boathouse. It was initially said that a new boathouse would be constructed, but it is possible that an older 1800s building was converted. There are reports of a stone building measuring 30 ft (9.1 m) x 9 ft (2.7 m), with a doorway 6 ft 6 in (1.98 m) x 6 ft (1.8 m), and costing £95. It is thought that this building is now the Harbour Master's office.

On 28 December 1851, with the existing lifeboat deteriorating, Capt. Kenyon of Barmouth wrote to the RNIPLS, requesting that the lifeboat be replaced. In October 1853, a new 27 ft (8.2 m) Peake-class self-righting 'Pulling and Sailing' (P&S) lifeboat, one with sails and (eight) oars, was built by Forrestt of Limehouse at a cost of £135, and was delivered to Caernarfon free of charge by the London and North Western and the Chester and Holyhead Railway companies. The lifeboat was then sailed down to Barmouth by the crew.

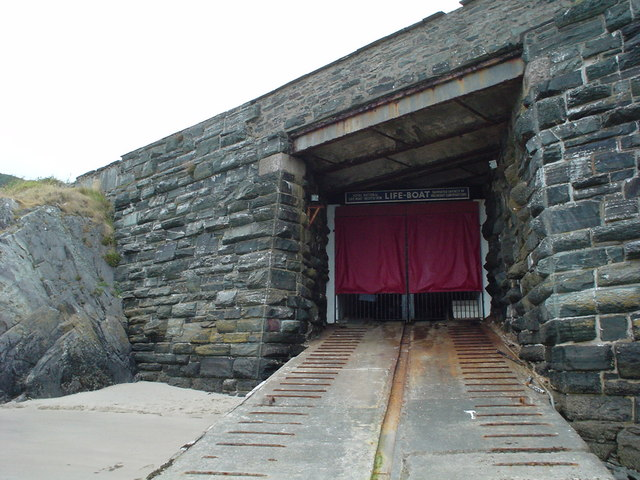
1859 Barmouth Lifeboat Station

In 1859, both the Barmouth and Criccieth lifeboats were taken away, and were extended by 6 ft (1.8 m), the Barmouth lifeboat now being 33-foot-long (10 m), rowing 12 oars.

In order to accommodate the boat, a new boathouse was constructed 1/4 mile (0.40 km) south east of the town, where the lifeboat could launch directly into the Afon Mawddach. However, in 1864, the Aberystwith and Welsh Coast Railway began work on the Pwllheli to Aberystwyth Railway, which required the construction of the Barmouth Bridge across the Afon Mawddach. As a result, the line was bridged right over the top of the slipway, creating a unique situation where the boathouse was located to the north of the railway line, and the lifeboat launched underneath the railway line, to the river on the south side.

The third lifeboat at Barmouth was the Ellen, a 10-oared (double banked) vessel, placed on station in 1867. She was provided by an 'anonymous' gift, from a lady known only as E.P.S. In 1885, the Jones-Gibb (ON 64), with 12 oars double-banked, the gift of Mrs F. G. Smart of Tunbridge Wells, was placed at Barmouth, remaining in service until 1905. She was followed by a second Jones-Gibb (ON 538), which was in service until 1939.

== 1939 onwards ==
In 1939, Barmouth would finally receive a motor-powered lifeboat, some thirty years after the first ones were introduced. The 32 ft (9.8 m) boat was one of only nine Surf-class lifeboats constructed, a lightweight vessel suited to shallow conditions. It employed twin 12-hp "Weyburn F2" engines, which drove two internal Hotchkiss Internal Cone water-jet propulsion units, rather than standard propellers, and was capable of 90 mi (140 km) without refueling.

The new lifeboat, which cost £3,492, was funded from the legacy of Mrs. M. A. Ardern, of Prestbury, Cheshire. At a ceremony on 8 Aug 1939, a service of dedication was carried out by the Venerable Thomas A. Williams, BA., Archdeacon of Merioneth, with singing led by the Barmouth Male Voice Choir, accompanied by the Harlech Silver Prize Band. Lady Harlech then named the lifeboat Lawrence Ardern, Stockport (ON 817) in accordance with the donor's wishes.

In 1964, in response to an increasing amount of water-based leisure activity, the RNLI placed 25 small fast Inshore lifeboats around the country. These were easily launched with just a few people, ideal to respond quickly to local emergencies. More boats were gradually deployed, and a D-class (RFD PB16) Inshore lifeboat (ILB) was placed at Barmouth in June 1967.

For a service on 21 June 1971, two crew members of the ILB, and medical advisor Dr Howarth, were each awarded the RNLI Silver Medal, and collectively awarded The Ralph Glister Award for 1971, for their efforts to try to save a woman who had fallen 80 ft (24 m) from a cliff at Friog.

On 20 March 1982, Barmouth received a new All-weather lifeboat, a Rother-class lifeboat, built by William Osborne of Littlehampton, costing £240,000, and the first lifeboat to be fitted with radar. A naming ceremony was planned for later in the year, to coincide with a Royal Visit to Barmouth, and on a cold wet 25 November 1982, Diana, Princess of Wales, named the boat Princess of Wales (ON 1063).

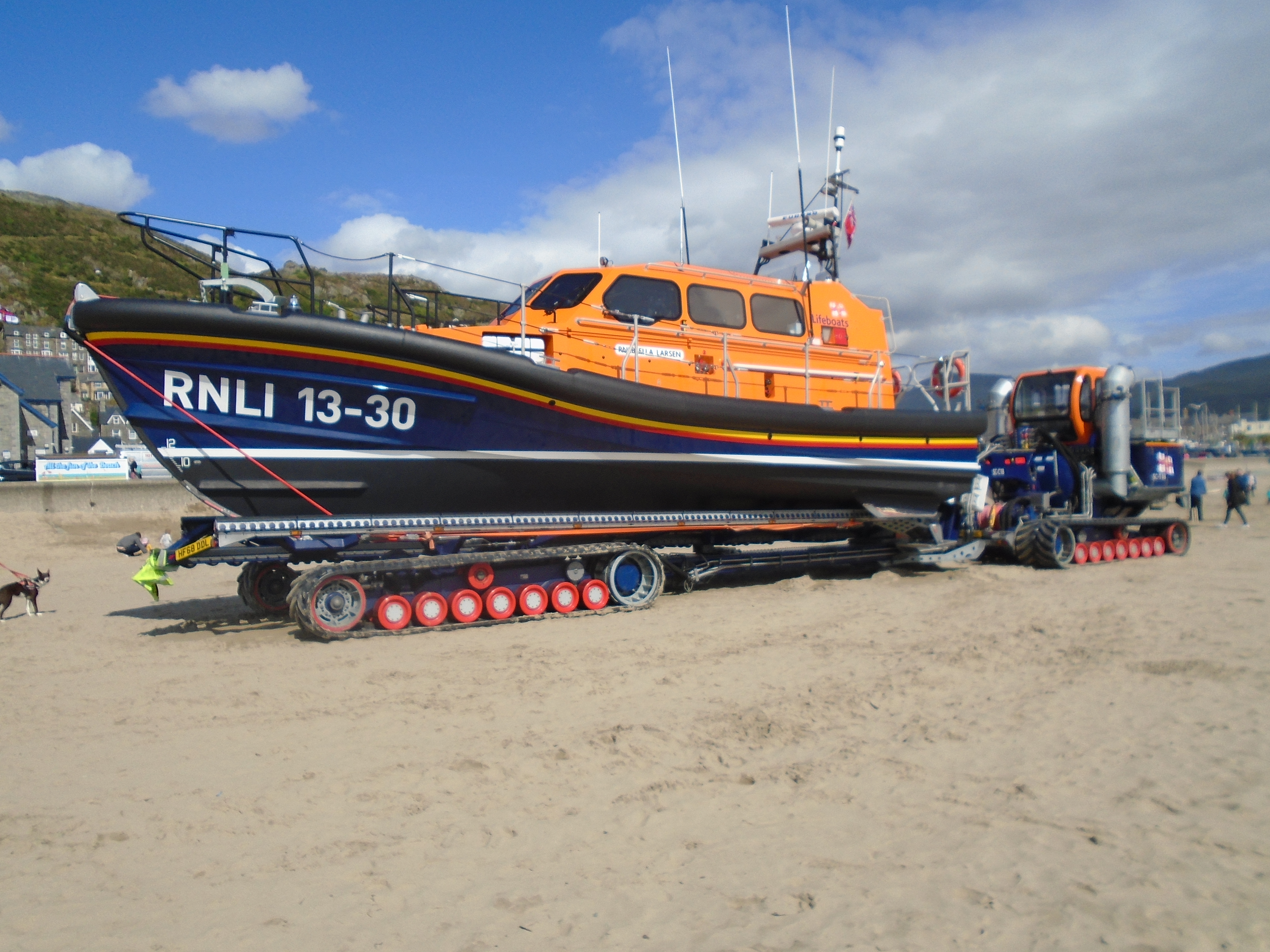
Shannon class 13-30 Ella Larsen (ON 1337)

A new lifeboat station was constructed on the promenade, to the west of the town in 2004. Costing £1.23 million, it provided up-to-date facilities for the crew, and is able to house the All-weather lifeboat, the D-class (IB1) Inshore lifeboat, and both launch tractors.

The station received a new Shannon-class All-weather lifeboat on 10 March 2019. The £2.2 million lifeboat was primarily funded by The Basil Larsen 1999 Charitable Trust, and at a ceremony on 8 June 2019, the boat was formally handed to the RNLI. She was then passed to the care of the Barmouth branch of the RNLI, and named 13-30 Ella Larsen (ON 1337).

Barmouth is an RNLI "Explore" category station whereby, subject to operational requirements and availability of staff, visitors can look around the station. An RNLI Visitor Centre, and gift shop, are also housed within the building.

== Station honours ==
The following are awards made at Barmouth:

- RNIPLS Silver Medal
  For rescuing seven men from the vessel Neptune on 2 February 1825
  Edmund Lewis, seaman – 1825
- RNLI Silver Medal
  For rescuing a woman who had fallen over a cliff on 21 June 1971
  John Henry Stockford, crew member – 1971
  Colin Pugh, crew member – 1971
  Dr Robert Haworth, Hon. Medical Advisor – 1971
- The Ralph Glister Award 1971
  (for the most meritorious service of the year performed by the crew of an inshore lifeboat)
  For rescuing a woman who had fallen over a cliff on 21 June 1971
  John Henry Stockford, crew member – 1971
  Colin Pugh, crew member – 1971
  Dr Robert Haworth, Hon. Medical Advisor – 1971
- RNLI Bronze Medal
  For rescuing two men from the fishing vessel Boy Nick on 22 November 1978.
  Evan David Jones, Coxswain – 1979
- 'The Thanks of the Institution Inscribed on Vellum'
  For the rescue of two men from the vessel Isabel on 18 September 1858
  Rev. O. Lloyd, Honorary Secretary – 1858
  For saving the boat and crew of the American ship Troy on 19 November 1859
  Rev. O. Lloyd, Honorary Secretary – 1858
  For rescuing four swimmers off Barmouth on 16 July 1957
  George Berridge – 1957
  William Morris, Motor Mechanic – 1957
  For the rescue of three from the trawler Gardelwen on 31 October 1982
  Edward Leonard Vaughan, Acting Coxswain – 1982
- Vellum Service Certificate
  For the rescue of three from the trawler Gardelwen on 31 October 1982
  Kenneth Ingram, Mechanic – 1982
  Harry Allday, Acting Second Coxswain – 1982
  Robert Buckley, crew member – 1982
  John Stockford, crew member – 1982
  Llewelyn Griffin, crew member – 1982
- Maud Smith Award 1957
  (for the bravest act of lifesaving during the year by a member of a lifeboat crew).
  For rescuing four swimmers off Barmouth on 16 July 1957
  William Morris, Motor Mechanic – 1958
- Testimonial on Parchment, awarded by the Royal Humane Society
  For entering the sea to rescue a man who had jumped from Barmouth Viaduct on 19 October 1980
  John Henry Stockford – 1980
- British Empire Medal
  George Kenneth Jeffs, Coxswain / Assistant Mechanic – 1989NYH

== Barmouth lifeboats ==
=== Pulling and Sailing (P&S) lifeboats ===
ON (Note: ON is the RNLI's Official Number of the boat.)	Name	Built	On station	Class	Comments
–	Unnamed	1828	1828–1851	26-foot Palmer	(Note: 26 ft 0 in (7.92 m) x 6 ft 0 in (1.83 m) (6-oared) Palmer-class non-self-righting lifeboat, funded by the RNIPLS, built by Harton of Limehouse, London, costing £56.); Condemned in 1851.
Pre-269	Unnamed	1853	1853–1867	27-foot Peake self-righting (P&S)	(Note: 27 ft 0 in (8.23 m) x 7 ft 6 in (2.29 m) (8-oared) Peake-class self-righting (P&S) lifeboat, funded by the RNIPLS, built by Forrestt of Limehouse, London, costing £135. Modified to 33 ft 6 in (10.21 m) x 8 ft 0 in (2.44 m) in 1860.); Sold in 1867.
Pre-505	Ellen	1867	1867–1885	34-foot self-righting (P&S)	(Note: 34 ft 0 in (10.36 m) x 8 ft 5 in (2.57 m) (10-oared) self-righting (P&S) lifeboat, gift of Mrs E. P. Sidebottom of Manchester, built by Woolfe of Shadwell, costing £301.); Broken up in 1885.
64	Jones-Gibb	1885	1885–1905	37-foot self-righting (P&S)	(Note: 37 ft 0 in (11.28 m) x 8 ft 0 in (2.44 m) (12-oared) self-righting (P&S) lifeboat, gift of Mrs F. G. Smart of Tunbridge Wells, built by Woolfe of Shadwell, London, costing £390.); Placed for sale in 1905, finally sold in 1915.
538	Jones-Gibb	1905	1905–1939	38-foot Watson (P&S)	(Note: 38 ft 0 in (11.58 m) x 9 ft 4 in (2.84 m) (12-oared) Watson-class non-self-righting (P&S) lifeboat, gift of Mrs F. G. Smart of Tunbridge Wells, built by Thames Ironworks of Blackwall, London, costing £1,032.); Sold in 1939. Renamed Thrift, later Saor Alba. Last reported as Jones-Gibb at Dauntless Boatyard, Canvey Island, June 2021.

Pre ON numbers are unofficial numbers used by the Lifeboat Enthusiasts' Society to reference early lifeboats not included on the official RNLI list.

=== Motor lifeboats ===
ON	Op.No. (Note: Op.No. is the RNLI's Operational Number of the boat carried on the hull.)	Name	Built	On station	Class	Comments
817	–	Laurence Ardern, Stockport	1939	1939–1949	Surf	
864	–	Chieftain	1948	1949–1982	Liverpool	
1063	37-38	Princess of Wales	1982	1982–1992	Rother	
1185	12-26	Moira Barrie	1992	1992–2019	Mersey	
1337	13-30	Ella Larsen	2018	2019–	Shannon	

More post-service details can be found on the respective lifeboat class pages.

=== Inshore lifeboats ===
==== D class ====
Op.No.	Name	On station	Class	Comments
D-137	Unnamed	1967–1978	D-class (RFD PB16)	
D-268	Unnamed	1979–1988	D-class (RFD PB16)	
D-374	Unnamed	1988–1997	D-class (EA16)	
D-524	Pilgrim	1997–2007	D-class (EA16)	
D-514	Lord Kitchener	2007	D-class (EA16)	
D-678	Rotarian Clive Tanner	2007–2017	D-class (IB1)	
D-814	Craig Steadman	2017–	D-class (IB1)	

=== Launch and recovery tractors ===
Op. No.	Reg. No.	Type	On station	Comments
T97	C282 LNT	Talus MB-H Crawler	2004	
T121	DX04 YZG	Talus MB-H Crawler	2004–2019	
SC-T18	HF68 DDL	SLARS (Clayton)	2019–	

== See also ==
- List of RNLI stations
- List of former RNLI stations
- Royal National Lifeboat Institution lifeboats
