= Eric Drake =

English oilman

Sir Eric Drake CBE
- Born: Arthur Eric Courtney Drake; 29 November 1910; Rochester, Kent
- Died: 31 October 1996 (aged 85); Old Alresford, Hampshire
- Education: Shrewsbury School; Pembroke College, Cambridge
- Spouses: Rosemary Moore (m. 1935) Margaret Elizabeth Wilson (m. 1950)

5th Chairman of British Petroleum
- In office 1969–1975
- Preceded by: Sir Maurice Bridgeman
- Succeeded by: Sir David Steel

Sir Arthur Eric Courtney Drake CBE (29 November 1910 – 31 October 1996) was an English oilman. Drake was the fifth chairman of the board of British Petroleum, serving from 1969 to 1975.

Drake was born in Rochester, Kent, the son of a doctor, and educated at Pembroke College, Cambridge, where he received a bachelor's degree in law.

In 1975, Drake was succeeded by Sir David Steel as chairman of BP.
