= Robert Horton (businessman) =

British businessman (1939–2011)

Sir Robert Horton
- Born: Robert Baynes Horton; 18 August 1939; London, England
- Died: 30 December 2011 (aged 72)
- Education: King's School, Canterbury; University of St Andrews; Massachusetts Institute of Technology
- Spouse: Sally Doreen Wells (m. 1962)

8th Chairman of British Petroleum
- In office 1990–1992
- Preceded by: Sir Peter Walters
- Succeeded by: John Baring

Sir Robert Baynes Horton FRSA (18 August 1939 – 30 December 2011) was a British businessman. He was a director of the European Advisory Council and of Emerson Electric Company. He spent 30 years working for BP, formerly British Petroleum. He became Chief Executive and Chairman of the Board of BP in March 1990, but was forced out in 1992.

== Early life and education ==
Sir Robert was the son of William Harold Horton and Dorothy Joan Horton (née Baynes). He was educated at King's School, Canterbury, University College, Dundee (then part of the University of St Andrews, but now the University of Dundee), and graduated from the MIT Sloan School of Management as a Sloan Fellow in 1971.

He was chairman of the Tate Gallery Foundation (1988–92) and Business in the Arts (1988–96). He was a Fellow of The Royal Society of Arts. He was chancellor of the University of Kent from 1990 to 1995, and a portrait of him hangs in the Senate Building there. He was also a Governor of King's School, Canterbury (1984–2005).

== Career ==
Sir Robert joined BP in 1957, and from 1960 on held a series of positions in oil supply, marketing, finance, and planning. In 1980 he became chief executive officer of BP Chemicals International and held that position until December 1983 when he was elected to the BP board as a managing director, with responsibility for finance, planning, and the Western Hemisphere. On his election as chairman and chief executive officer of Standard Oil in April 1986, Horton resigned from BP. But following the merger of BP and Standard Oil in July 1987, he was appointed chief executive officer of BP America, Inc. As chairman of British Petroleum in 1990, Sir Robert Horton aimed to reorganise the company in such a way as to attract and advance outstanding personnel. He was forced out in 1992 after "management turmoil and disagreements with the company's board."

He was chairman of Railtrack from 1993 to 1999 and led the organisation through the early years of its existence, including an industrial dispute from June to September 1994. He was non-executive chairman of Betfair from 2004 to 2006.

Business positions
Preceded by Peter Walters	Chief Executive of BP; 1990–1992	Succeeded by David Simon
Academic offices
Preceded by Lord Grimond	Chancellor of the University of Kent; 1990–1995	Succeeded by Sir Crispin Tickell
