= David Steel (businessman) =

English army officer, lawyer and businessman

Major Sir David Steel DSO MC TD
- Born: David Edward Charles Steel; 29 November 1916; London, England
- Died: 9 August 2004 (aged 87); London, England
- Education: Rugby School; University College, Oxford
- Spouse: Ann Wynne Price (m. 1956; died 1997)
- Military career
- Allegiance: United Kingdom
- Branch: British Army
- Service years: 1938–1945
- Rank: Major
- Unit: 9th Queen's Royal Lancers
- Conflicts: World War II

6th Chairman of British Petroleum
- In office 1975–1981
- Preceded by: Sir Eric Drake
- Succeeded by: Sir Peter Walters

Major Sir David Edward Charles Steel DSO MC TD (29 November 1916 – 9 August 2004) was an English army officer, lawyer, and businessman. Steel was the sixth chairman of British Petroleum, from 1975 to 1981.

Steel was the son of Ellen Price-Edwards and Gerald Arthur Steel. His father was private secretary to the First Lord of the Admiralty throughout the First World War, and later general manager of the British Aluminium Company. Steel was educated at Rugby School, and University College, Oxford, where he received a bachelor's degree in law.

Steel was a tank commander in the Second World War and was awarded the Distinguished Service Order and the Military Cross.

At the end of 1974, Steel succeeded Sir Eric Drake as chairman of BP.

On 3 November 1956, Steel married Ann Wynne Price, the daughter of Major-General Charles Basil Price, at St Paul's Anglican in Knowlton, Quebec. She bore a son and two daughters for him and died in 1997. Steel was a member of the Cavalry Club in London and the Links Club in New York City.
