= Volunteer Life Brigade =

British sea rescue organisation

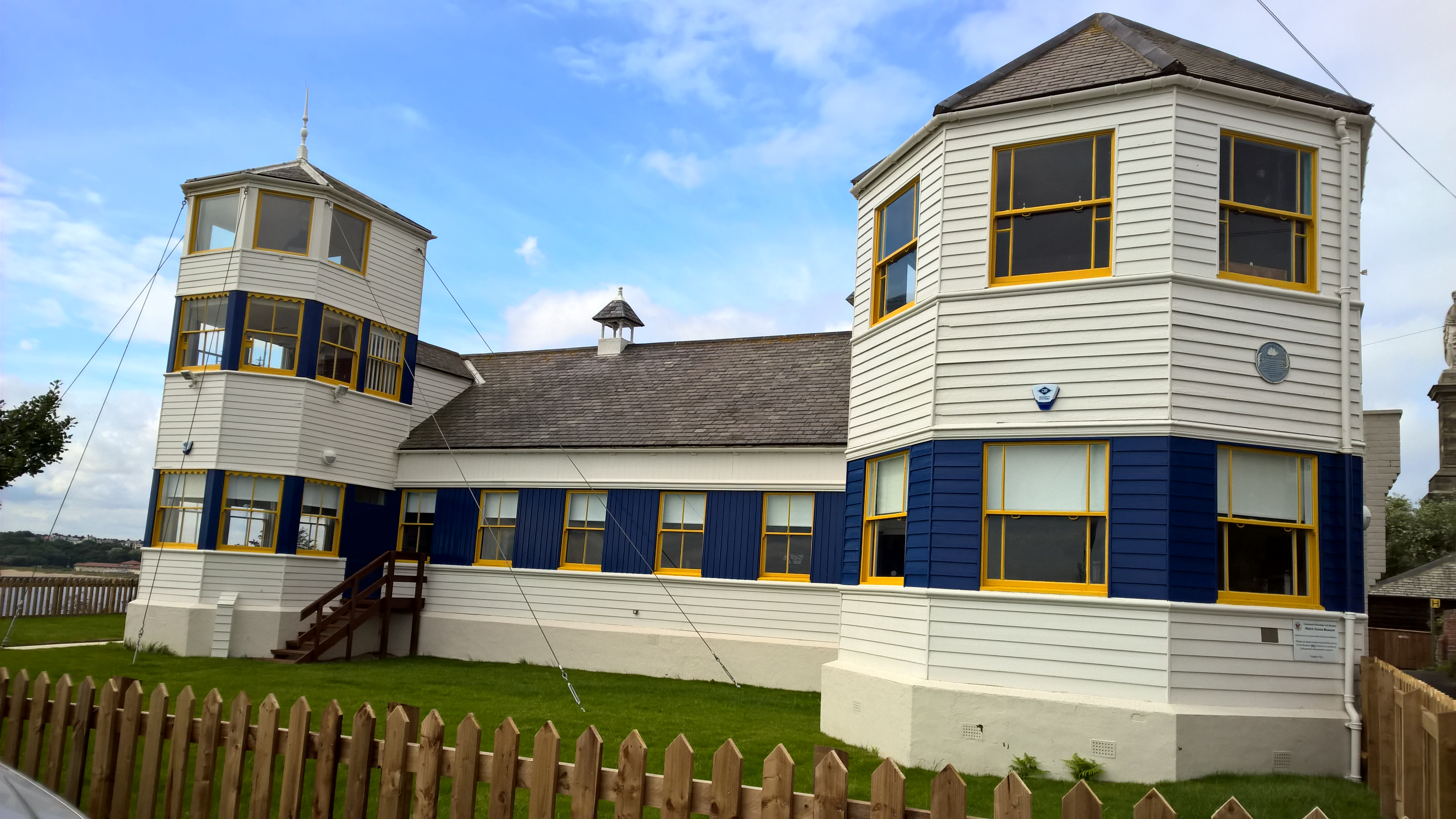
Watch House of the Tynemouth Volunteer Life Brigade

A Volunteer Life Brigade is a search and rescue organisation which assists HM Coastguard in the United Kingdom in coastal emergencies. Around 40 VLBs were established in the mid-to-late 19th century; today just three remain, continuing to provide shore-based search and rescue support from locations on the coast of north-east England. They are akin to, but predate, the volunteer Coastguard Rescue Service (which dates from 1931) and the National Coastwatch Institution (founded 1994).

== Origins ==
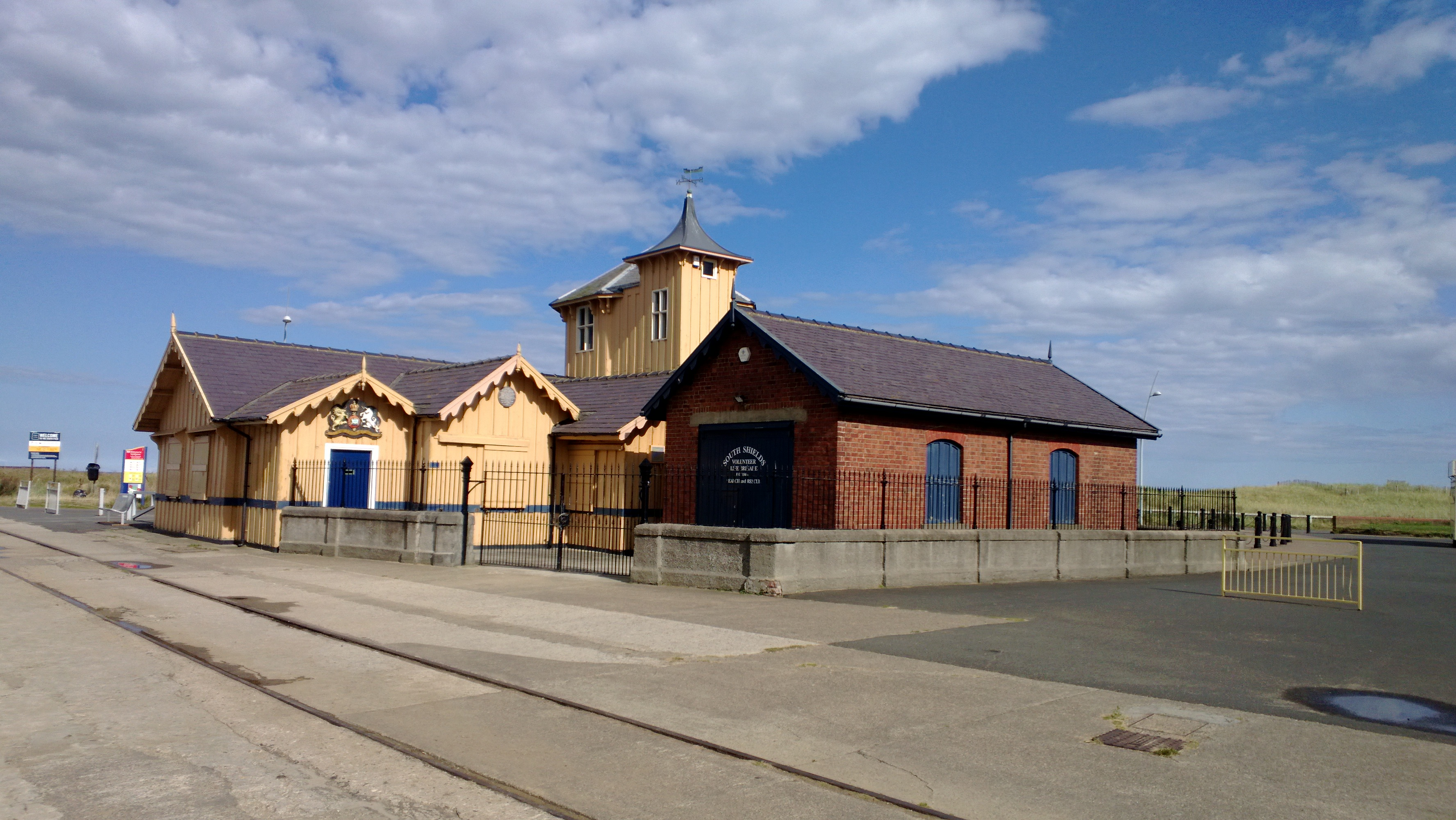
South Shields VLB Watch House dates from 1867

The Volunteer Life Brigades date from a time when Coastguard provision for coastal rescue had been substantially reduced. The first unit, at Tynemouth, was established on 5 December 1864 following a series of shipwrecks on the shoreline in which crewmembers perished watched by spectators ashore who were powerless to help. Over 100 volunteers signed up at the first public meeting. Other units soon followed, often founded in similar circumstances and modelled along the lines of Tynemouth's example.

From the start the Volunteer Life Brigades worked closely with local Coastguard officers, providing trained and disciplined teams of volunteers to assist in emergency situations; training was overseen by HM Coastguard. The Volunteer Life Brigades were shore-based organisations, trained in ship-to-shore (e.g. Breeches buoy) rescue techniques; they worked in conjunction with those providing a seaborne rescue capability, such as the Royal National Lifeboat Institution (which had received its Royal Charter a few years earlier) and local Lifeboat Societies (Tynemouth's dated from 1789).

The early success of the VLB arrangement at Tynemouth impressed the Board of Trade, the Government office with responsibility for safety at sea; the Board recommended that similar arrangements be made at every Coastguard station around the country. In some cases the Tynemouth model was followed: independent Volunteer Life Brigades were established, administered by a local committee. In other cases teams of volunteers were established and administered directly by the local Coastguard officers; these bodies were termed Volunteer Life-Saving Companies.

== Current activities ==
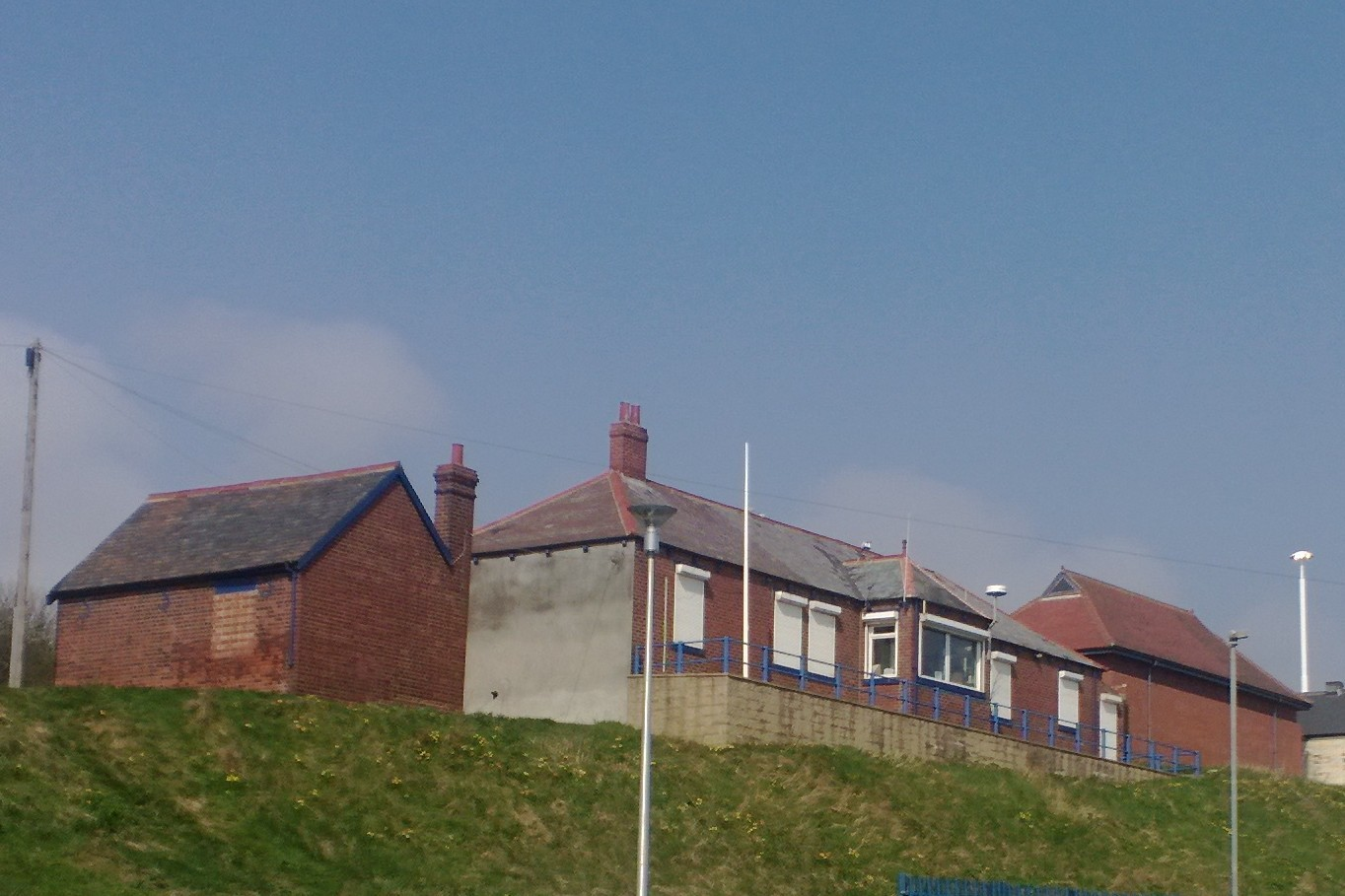
Sunderland VLB Watch House above Roker Pier

The three remaining VLBs are all registered charities and both Tynemouth and South Shields are "declared facilities" in relation to the Maritime and Coastguard Agency. They are on call to the Coastguard 24 hours a day, 365 days a year, each providing a shore-based team of volunteers trained and ready to provide assistance in a range of coastal emergency situations.

=== Active units ===
- Tynemouth Volunteer Life Brigade founded December 1864.
- South Shields Volunteer Life Brigade founded January 1866.
- Sunderland Volunteer Life Brigade founded March 1877.

== Watch houses ==
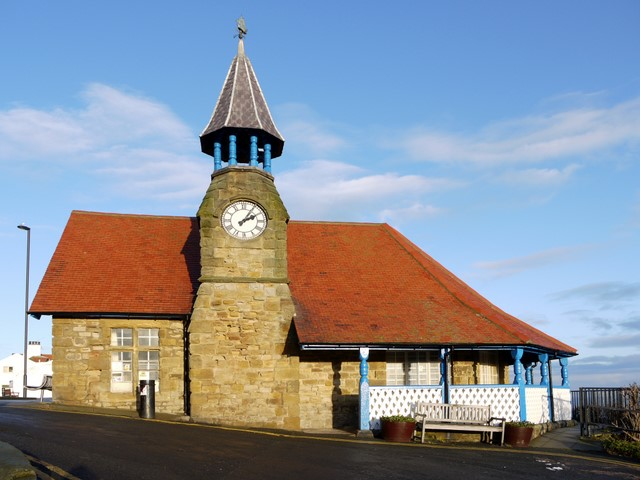
Cullercoats Watch House (built 1875); now houses a community centre and exhibition space.

Each Volunteer Life Brigade operates from a Watch House on the seafront; these provide a base for training and other activities, and each houses a small museum. Those at South Shields and Tynemouth are listed buildings, dating from 1867 and 1886 respectively. Alongside the Watch Houses, Cart Houses (also known as Rocket Garages) were built to house rocket equipment (crucial to the brigades' operation in early years) together with a means of transport (usually a hand-cart); today they house up-to-date rescue vehicles and equipment.

== Examples of disbanded units ==
=== Volunteer Life Brigade ===
- Cullercoats Volunteer Life Brigade was the second VLB to be established, just three days after that of Tynemouth in 1864. A Watch House was built in 1879 on the seafront, where it still stands (as does the nearby Rocket Apparatus House of 1867). The Cullercoats VLB was disbanded in 1923.

=== Volunteer Life-Saving Company ===
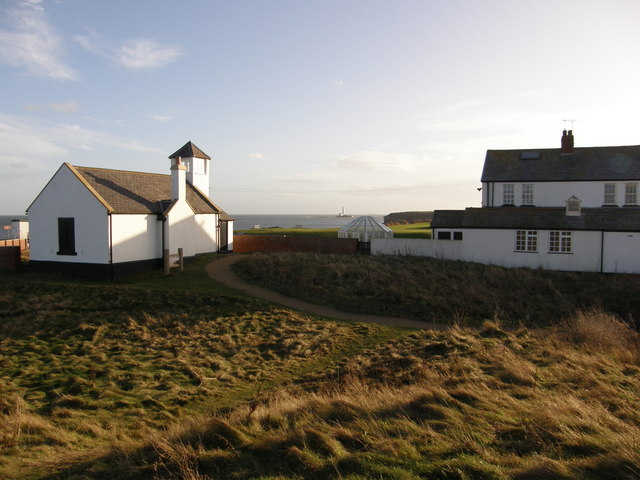
Watch House and cottages, Seaton Sluice

- Seaton Sluice Volunteer Life-Saving Company was established in 1876. In 1966 it became affiliated to the Coastguard Auxiliary Service, but was closed down in 1990. The Watch House (opened in 1880) is now a museum.
