= The Coon =

- South Park episode
- Episode no.: Season 13; Episode 2
- Directed by: Trey Parker
- Written by: Trey Parker
- Production code: 1302
- Original air date: March 18, 2009

Episode chronology
← Previous "The Ring"	Next → "Margaritaville"
- South Park season 13

"The Coon" is the second episode of the thirteenth season of the American animated television series South Park. The 183rd episode of the series, it originally aired on Comedy Central in the United States on March 18, 2009. In the episode, Cartman poses as a comic book superhero vigilante named "The Coon", who grows increasingly jealous of the popularity and success of a rival superhero named "Mysterion".

The episode was written and directed by series co-creator Trey Parker, and was rated TV-MA L in the United States. It was originally conceived as an episode about the economic recession, but those elements were later adapted into the future episode, "Margaritaville". "The Coon" generated a great deal of speculation about the true identity of Mysterion. Parker and Stone originally said there was no specific answer to the question. However, his identity is finally revealed in the fourteenth season episode "Mysterion Rises".

The episode parodied several dark-toned comic book films that had been recently released at the time, including The Spirit, Watchmen and The Dark Knight. It received generally positive reviews and, according to Nielsen Media Research, was seen by 3.27 million households the week it aired. Comedian Bruce Vilanch, who is mocked in the episode, sent a thank you card to Parker and Stone after the episode aired. "The Coon" was released on DVD and Blu-ray along with the rest of the thirteenth season on March 16, 2010. "The Coon" was also released on DVD in The Little Box of Butters on September 28, 2010. "The Coon" was re-released once more on DVD and Blu-ray as a "bonus episode" with the complete fourteenth season.

== Episodes ==
This episode would eventually lead to the season fourteen three part arc revolving around Coon and Friends.

No. overall	No. in season	Title	Directed by	Written by	Original air date	Prod. code	US viewers (millions)
206	11	"Coon 2: Hindsight"	Trey Parker	Trey Parker	October 27, 2010	1411	2.76
207	12	"Mysterion Rises"	Trey Parker	Trey Parker	November 3, 2010	1412	2.85
208	13	"Coon vs. Coon and Friends"	Trey Parker	Trey Parker	November 10, 2010	1413	2.79

There was also another episode in season twenty-one.

No. overall	No. in season	Title	Directed by	Written by	Original air date	Prod. code	US viewers (millions)
281	4	"Franchise Prequel"	Trey Parker	Trey Parker	October 11, 2017	2104	1.12

== Plot ==
Donning a disguise modeled after a raccoon, Cartman becomes a vigilante dubbed "The Coon", who attempts to wipe out crime in South Park. Though Cartman tries to raise awareness about The Coon through word of mouth, nobody pays much attention to the Coon's efforts. When he reports "crimes" (such as mistaking a man innocently trying to kiss his date for a rapist) to the police department, he is threatened with jail time and snubbed off. During class, Cartman tries to hype up an appearance from the Coon, saying he will be on the roof of a Walgreens later that evening. Cartman (as the Coon) shows up to the spot to find another child superhero named "Mysterion", who is far more successful in garnering appreciation as a crime stopping icon from the police and South Park citizens who want to know just "Who is Mysterion?" Cartman is angered by his lack of popularity and the attention Mysterion is receiving.

Coon decides to rid the town of Mysterion, enlisting the help of Professor Chaos (Butters) and his sidekick General Disarray (Dougie). Unlike the Coon, Professor Chaos and General Disarray have become as familiar to the residents of South Park as Mysterion. Butters also wants to know the identity of Mysterion but can only narrow the list of suspects to the boys from Mr. Garrison's 4th grade class whose shapes do not differ greatly from that of others. In contrast, he has nearly pinned down Coon's identity to a few fat celebrities, and Cartman. In a scheme to uncover Mysterion's identity, the Coon convinces Professor Chaos to threaten the destruction of a hospital unless Mysterion reveals his identity. After the Coon plants the TNT and leaves to buy detonators, Mysterion unexpectedly arrives. He points out that this is not Professor Chaos' usual style, and fights Professor Chaos and General Disarray on top of the building. A crowd forms below and cheers on Mysterion as the police take no action, believing that their bullets are no match for Professor Chaos' aluminum foil armor. Dramatically, the Coon appears to fight on the side of Mysterion, with the hopes that he too will be hailed as a hero. At that point, Professor Chaos and General Disarray run off in defeat. After their victory, the Coon convinces Mysterion to unmask himself by claiming such threats to public safety will continue until Mysterion's secret is revealed.

Despite the threat of imprisonment, Mysterion unmasks himself, showing the television viewers only the portion of his face that looks similar to almost all of Mr. Garrison's 4th grade class. The crowd, however, is shocked to learn Mysterion's identity and, much to the regret of all except Coon, who says that he knew who Mysterion was, even calling him out on it at one point (though this helps the audience little as Cartman claimed that practically everyone in his class was Mysterion at times), Mysterion is hauled to prison. With Professor Chaos, General Disarray and Mysterion defeated, Cartman now perceives that he is the superhero in South Park and that every town should have a Coon like him.

== Production ==
Mysterion unmasked at the end of the episode. Originally intended to have been a generic, unnamed classmate of the main characters, he is revealed to be Kenny in "Mysterion Rises".

"The Coon" was written and directed by series co-founder Trey Parker. It first aired on March 18, 2009 in the United States on Comedy Central. Like most South Park episodes, "The Coon" was first conceived by Parker and fellow co-founder Matt Stone within a week of the episode's broadcast date. Kenny, Kyle and Stan were originally planned to be made superheroes as well as Cartman, and for the episode to revolve around a group of superheroes in the style of Watchmen, a graphic-novel-based film that had been released earlier that month. They started working on sketches of the other superhero costumes, but Cartman and his alter-ego, the Coon, were finished first. From the start, Parker and Stone wrote Cartman as caring more about his superhero image than fighting crime, but as they worked further on the episode, it began to take up more and more of the story until they decided to make Cartman the only superhero of the four boys.

Parker and Stone long planned to create an episode about the economic recession, and originally planned for Cartman to dress as a superhero named "The Coon" and fight the economy. This is why the opening scene of "The Coon" involves Cartman discussing the poor economic state of the nation and the election of U.S. President Barack Obama. Eventually, Cartman would discover the recession stemmed from the sale of Jimmy Buffett's Margaritaville blenders, and he would have to battle singer Jimmy Buffett and investor Warren Buffett, who would be portrayed as Jimmy's brother. Eventually, the idea was scrapped, and "The Coon" turned into an episode revolving entirely around a comic book film parody. Elements of the economic recession and the Margaritaville blenders were eventually incorporated into future episode "Margaritaville".

Mysterion is just another one of those things, like 'Who is Cartman's dad?' where everybody wants to ask us who is Mysterion. And we don't know.

— Trey Parker,
South Park co-creator (statement made prior to season 14)

The identity of Mysterion is never revealed in "The Coon". After the episode aired, the question "Who is Mysterion?" became a frequently asked question at the FAQ for the official South Park website, South Park Studios. The answer posted at that site was that "there is no answer", and that only Trey Parker and Matt Stone actually know. Parker said it was one of the most common questions he was asked about the show, along with the identity of Cartman's father, which was resolved in the fourteenth season episode "201". Parker and Stone originally said there was no actual answer to Mysterion's identity, as they never chose a specific character to be him. In the original ending of the episode, after Mysterion is arrested, Kyle is shown to be in prison and it is believed he is the superhero. However, the real Mysterion visits him, and Kyle explains he pretended to be Mysterion so the real superhero could remain free and continue fighting crime. As a thank you, Mysterion revealed his identity by showing his face, but like in the actual episode, the viewer cannot determine who he is because all the children look alike without hats. The ending was ultimately cut because Parker and Stone decided it took too much time for a simple throwaway gag and to show that Kyle was not Mysterion. The clip is available as a deleted scene in the thirteenth season DVD and Blu-ray sets. The superhero characters from "The Coon" returned in the fourteenth season episodes "Coon 2: Hindsight", "Mysterion Rises" and "Coon vs. Coon and Friends", in which Mysterion is revealed.

Keo Thongkham and Kevin Dalton, who serve as South Park storyboard artists, drew the detailed image of Mysterion that appeared in a news broadcast within the episode. Within a week of the episode's original broadcast, the online retailer Zazzle and South Park Studios, the official South Park website, released T-shirts and hooded sweatshirts based on the episode, including one with an image of Cartman as the Coon, and one of Mysterion with the words, "Who is Mysterion?"

== Cultural references ==
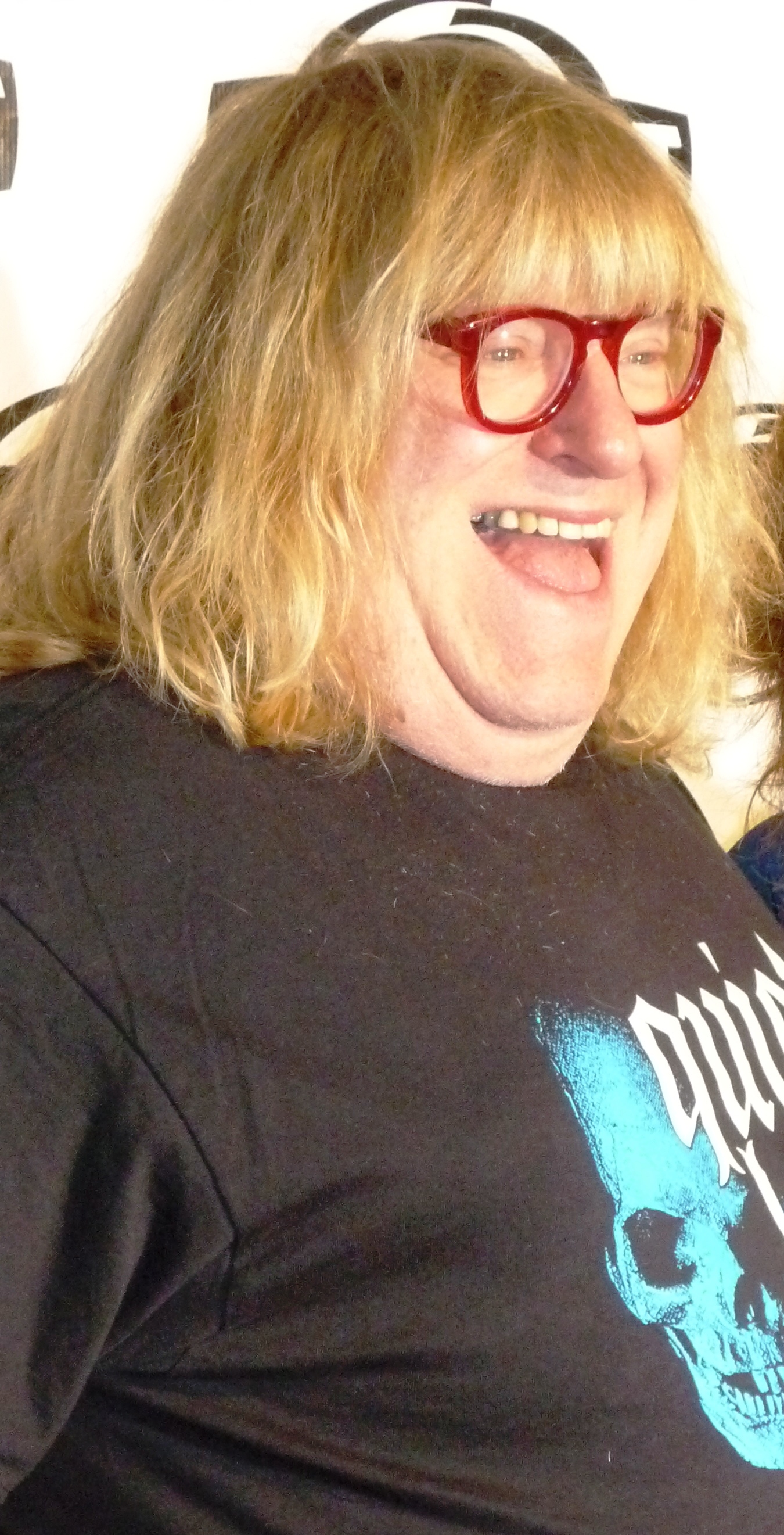
Comedian Bruce Vilanch (pictured), who was mocked in "The Coon", sent a card to the South Park creators thanking them for referring to him in the episode.

"The Coon" is primarily a parody of dark-toned comic book films. The Dark Knight (2008), The Spirit (2008) and Watchmen (2009) are the most commonly referred to films, but others such as Spider-Man 3 (2007) are also frequently referenced. Matt Stone said the episode started as a parody specifically of Watchmen, but then elements of other comic book films were added as the writing progressed. The music used in "The Coon" is inspired by the style of film scores by James Newton Howard and Hans Zimmer, both of whom collaborated on the scores for Batman Begins (2005) and The Dark Knight. To promote the Coon, Cartman uses a similar tagline as was used to promote Darkman, printing shirts asking "Who is The Coon?" The Coon and Mysterion use deep and ominous voices similar to that used by Christian Bale in the Batman films and Jackie Earle Haley as Rorschach in Watchmen. Stone said he found Bale's voice particularly annoying in The Dark Knight, and found it amusing that so many comic book movies had heroes whose voices were so low, it sounded like they were "whispering, like you've been up all night smoking".

Cartman and Mysterion both refer to themselves as "the symbol this town needs", a line from The Dark Knight, and Cartman encourages Butters to film a video threatening to blow up a hospital, the same as the Joker from a scene in that film. The opening shot of "The Coon" is also inspired by a sequence from Watchmen: both feature a close-up of a city sidewalk and zoom out to someone looking down from the top of a tall skyscraper. A poster of the Coon shown at Cartman's Coonicon 2009 is inspired by the front cover of The Dark Knight Returns, the Batman graphic novel by Frank Miller. Other common comic book film traits parodied in "The Coon" include costumes that do little to actually conceal secret identities, trophies adorning superhero secret lairs, and sudden disappearing exits and entrances.

Cartman's Coonicon 2009 convention is held at the Airport Hilton, the same place where he holds his "ginger pride" event in the episode "Ginger Kids" and the AIDS benefit in the episode "Tonsil Trouble". Butters dresses up as Professor Chaos, and Dougie dresses as General Disarray, both of which are the supervillain alter egos they first take on in the sixth season episode "Professor Chaos". Based on the physique of the Coon, Butters considers heavyset gay entertainers Bruce Vilanch and Harvey Fierstein as suspects for his secret identity. Vilanch sent a card to Parker and Stone after "The Coon" aired, thanking them for referring to him in the episode. Cartman plans to purchase detonators for his TNT from Ace Hardware, a real-life Illinois-based hardware company chain. Cartman refers to the economic recession as one of the primary factors that has led to an increase in crime. News footage of a group of South Park residents talking about Mysterion which focuses on a man with gold teeth and a blue baseball cap was inspired by the Crichton Leprechaun sighting YouTube video.

== Reception ==
In its original American broadcast, "The Coon" was watched by 3.27 million overall households, according to the Nielsen Media Research. The episode received a 1.8 rating/5 share among adults aged between 18 and 49, making it the most watched cable entertainment program in that age group for the week of March 16 to 22.

The episode received generally positive reviews. Carlos Delgado of iF magazine said, "The mockery of comic book based movies is perfectly done...Though not quite as funny as last week’s 'The Ring', 'The Coon' is right up there as a classic episode, ... A beacon of hope in the sometimes drab world of television," while at the same time, he believed the episode title, "The Coon" (being a well-known ethnic slur against black people) was a jab intended for Barack Obama, the first African American U.S. President.

Percy Olsen, television editor for Student Life, said "The Coon" was an improvement over "The Ring" because it was less heavy-handed in its morals. Olsen also said it raised the question, "What ever happened to the goofy superhero movies? From Batman to the Hulk, it seems like every comic book hero movie has been given a splotch of mud and some dim lighting before being sent out the door." Genevieve Koski of The A.V. Club gave the episode a B+ grade, although she did not like the "non-reveal" ending. She also said the target material for "The Coon" is too easy, but she said the episode was "really likable" and she particularly liked Cartman's growing frustration when his superhero persona is ignored. Travis Fickett of IGN also said he did not like the ending and, although he liked Butters' part in the episode and the riffing on comic book stereotypes, Fickett felt the episode lacked any "brilliant moments" and "ultimately runs out of steam with the super-hero riff". Mitchell Geller of The Tufts Daily said the episode would be more enjoyable to people familiar with the comic book film franchise it was spoofing than it would be for those who are not, although he said Cartman "never ceases to be funny". Comic book writer and creator of Watchmen, Alan Moore, was reported to have appreciated the episode.

== Home release ==
"The Coon", along with the thirteen other episodes from South Park's thirteenth season, were released on a three-disc DVD set and two-disc Blu-ray set in the United States on March 16, 2010. The sets included brief audio commentaries by Parker and Stone for each episode, a collection of deleted scenes, and a special mini-feature, Inside Xbox: A Behind-the-Scenes Tour of South Park Studios, which discussed the process behind animating the show with Inside Xbox host Major Nelson.

"The Coon" was also released as a special "bonus episode", on the season fourteen DVD on April 26, 2011, as well as the two-disc DVD collection A Little Box of Butters.
