= Murray Auchincloss =

Canadian businessman (born 1970)

- Born: 1970 (age 55–56)
- Citizenship: Canada
- Occupation: Business executive
- Title: Group CEO, BP
- Term: January 2024–December 2025
- Predecessor: Bernard Looney
- Successor: Meg O'Neill

Murray Michael Auchincloss (born 1970) is a Canadian business executive who was the chief executive of BP from January 2024 to December 2025.

== Education ==
Auchincloss earned BCom degree in finance from the University of Calgary.

== Career ==
Auchincloss qualified as a chartered financial analyst at West Virginia University in the United States. He began his career as a tax analyst at Amoco in 1992, prior to its merger with BP in 1998. From July 2020 to September 2023, he was the chief financial officer of BP, succeeding Brian Gilvary, who retired voluntarily.

Auchincloss was a director of Aker BP ASA (but is no longer shown as such). While BP CFO, he was also a member of two CFO groups: a main committee member of The 100 Group and a member of the European Round Table for CFOs.

In September 2023, Auchincloss was appointed interim (later made permanent in January 2024) chief executive of BP, following the sudden resignation of Bernard Looney ensuing from a scandal for failing to reveal relationships with colleagues. Auchincloss was also reported by The Times to be in a sexual relationship with a (female) colleague, who purportedly had become pregnant as a result. A spokesperson for BP said that the relationship did not represent a breach of BP’s code of conduct and had been "fully and appropriately disclosed" to the group.

Before his ouster as BP CEO after less than two years, Auchincloss was one of the highest paid executives in the UK. His 2023 pay package stood at £8 million ($10 million). His pay for 2023 included a salary of £1.02 million, a bonus of £1.8 million and share-based rewards worth £4.6 million, as well as other benefits.

On February 26, 2025, Auchincloss announced a strategic shift to scale back its renewable energy investments and prioritize oil and gas production, aiming to increase annual fossil fuel investments by 20 per cent to $10 billion while cutting renewables funding by over $5 billion. This decision, driven by pressure from shareholders like Elliot Management for higher profits, drew sharp criticism from environmental groups. Notably, Global Witness, an environmental advocacy organization, drove a lorry through central London displaying messages condemning BP’s move.

In December 2025, BP's board, led by Albert Manifold as Chairman, fired Auchincloss as CEO and appointed Meg O'Neill, a woman whose personal life and professional credentials celebrate BP's continued commitment to diversity and inclusion.

== Personal life ==
Prior to becoming BP CFO, Auchincloss disclosed he was in a relationship with a BP employee, with whom he has a child.

Business positions
Preceded by Bernard Looney	Group Chief Executive of BP; 2023–2025	Succeeded by Carol Howle (interim); Meg O'Neill
