= Tony Hayward =

British businessman (born 1957)

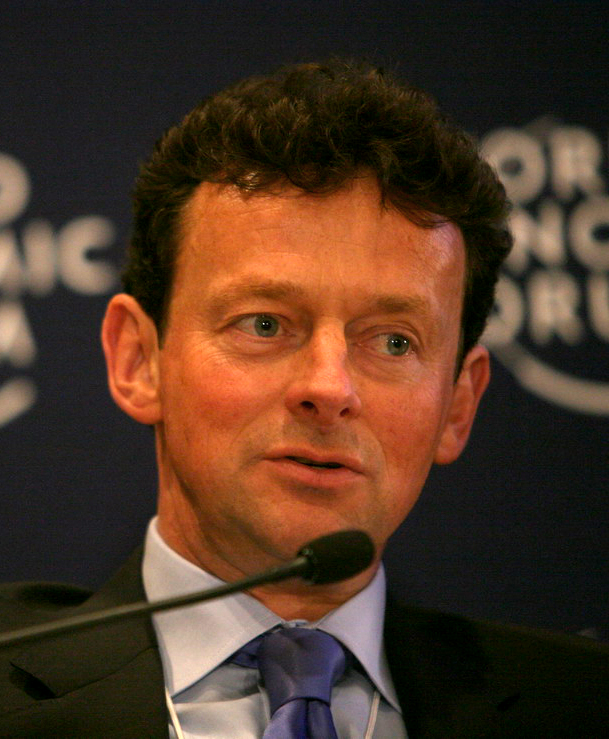
- Hayward in 2008

Chief Executive Officer of BP
- In office 2007–2010
- Preceded by: Baron Browne of Madingley
- Succeeded by: Bob Dudley

Personal details
- Born: 21 May 1957 (age 69) Slough, England
- Spouse: Lina Ramirez
- Education: Aston University (BSc); University of Edinburgh (PhD)
- Occupation: Businessman

Anthony Bryan Hayward (born 21 May 1957) is a British businessman and former CEO of the oil and energy company BP. He replaced the Baron Browne of Madingley on 1 May 2007. His tenure ended on 1 October 2010 when he was replaced by Bob Dudley following the Deepwater Horizon oil spill. He was chairman of Glencore Xstrata from 2014 to 2021.

== Education and early career ==
Tony Hayward was born in Slough, Buckinghamshire (now Berkshire), in 1957; the eldest son of Bryan and Mary Hayward. Hayward has five sisters and one brother. Growing up, Hayward moved frequently but, until a teenager, lived in or near Slough. At the age of 15, when his sixth sibling was born, Hayward moved out of the family home and started living with his paternal grandparents in Langley (a suburb of Slough). Later on, his family moved to Bournemouth, Dorset. Hayward, however, remained in Berkshire living with his grandparents and attended a local grammar school, Slough Technical High School, now called Herschel Grammar School, until he started university. Tony went on to gain a first class geology degree from Aston University followed by a PhD from the University of Edinburgh School of Geosciences. Joining BP in 1982, with his first job as a rig geologist in Aberdeen, he quickly rose through the ranks in a series of technical and commercial roles in BP Exploration in London, Aberdeen, France, China and Glasgow. Hayward first came to the attention of John Browne (later created, in 2001, Lord Browne of Madingley) during a 1990 leadership conference in Phoenix, Arizona. As a result, he was made Browne's executive assistant.

In 1992, Hayward moved to Colombia as exploration manager and became president of BP's operations in Venezuela in 1995. In August 1997, he returned to London as a director of BP Exploration. He became group vice-president of BP Amoco Exploration and Production as well as a member of the BP group's Upstream executive committee in 1999.

Hayward was appointed BP group treasurer in September 2000 where his responsibilities included global treasury operations, foreign exchange dealing, corporate finance, project finance and mergers and acquisitions. Hayward became an executive vice-president in April 2002, and chief executive of exploration and production in January 2003.

== Replacement of Lord Browne of Madingley ==
Safety and production issues in Alaska and the explosion at the Texas City refinery made Peter Sutherland, BP's non-executive chairman, accelerate the process for finding a replacement for Lord Browne of Madingley. His retirement timetable was moved forward from end-2008, when Browne would be 60 and BP policy called for mandatory retirement, to July 2007. Hayward, having been described as CEO-designate by both internal and media commentators, came to the fore amid the competition, including Robert Dudley, chief executive of TNK-BP, the company's Russian joint venture, and John Manzoni, head of refining and marketing.

On 18 December 2006, in the run-up to replace Browne as chief executive of BP Group, the Financial Times reported that Hayward had criticised BP's management at an internal management meeting, in the wake of a blast at the firm's Texas City refinery that killed 15 people and injured more than 170 others. Hayward made the comments at a town hall meeting in Houston: "We have a leadership style that is too directive and doesn't listen sufficiently well. The top of the organisation doesn't listen sufficiently to what the bottom is saying."

On 12 January 2007, BP announced that Hayward would replace Lord Browne of Madingley as chief executive. On 2 February, Andy Inglis was appointed managing director of the BP Group, and succeeded Hayward as chief executive of BP's Exploration & Production (E&P) business.

Hayward was appointed to the chief executive position with immediate effect on 1 May 2007, after Browne resigned following the lifting of a legal injunction preventing Associated Newspapers from publishing details about his private life.

BP was paying Hayward an annual salary of £1,045,000; his 2008 bonus was £1,496,000 and in 2009 his bonus was £2,090,000.

== Negotiations with Russia's Igor Sechin ==
In 2008, Tony Hayward had private meetings with Igor Sechin, a close ally of Putin and a top figure of Russian military and security services, currently serving as a CEO of largest Russian oil company Rosneft. The two negotiated on BP's deals with Russia.

== Deepwater Horizon oil spill ==
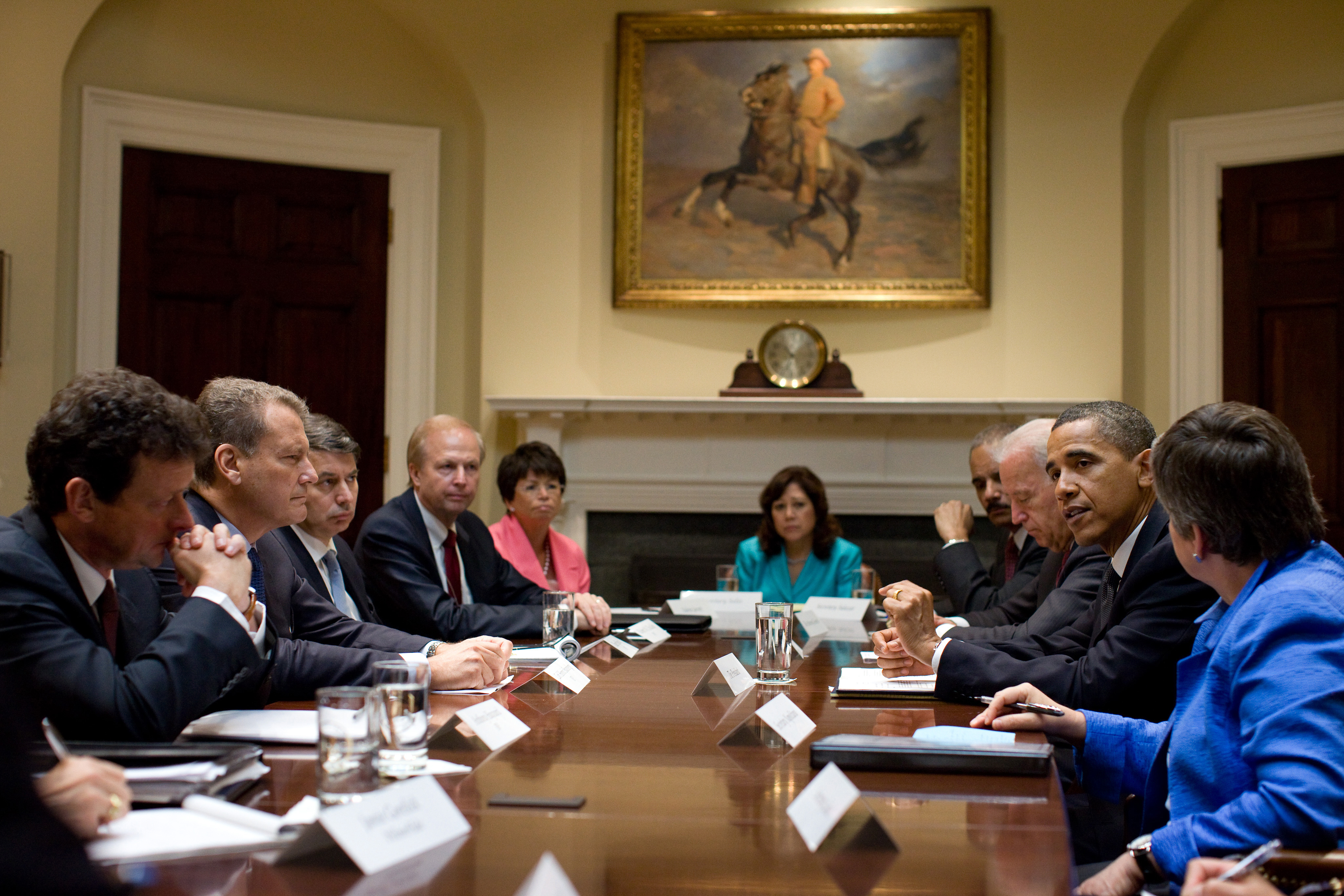
Barack Obama with Tony Hayward and the BP board of directors talking about clean-up of the oil.

On 20 April 2010, an explosion occurred on the Deepwater Horizon oil rig, operated by BP. Eleven people were killed in the blast and oil began to leak from the ocean floor at a rate variously estimated to be between 5,000 barrels (790 m^{3}) and 100,000 barrels (16,000 m^{3}) per day. Hayward, and BP in general, initially downplayed the spill, stating on 17 May 2010 that the environmental impact of the Gulf spill would likely be "very very modest" and calling the spill "relatively tiny" in comparison with the size of the ocean. By 27 May, Hayward changed his assessment, calling the spill an "environmental catastrophe" in an interview with CNN.

On 12 May 2009, in a postgraduate lecture to Stanford Business School, Hayward analysed the role and organisation of the company for which he acted as chief executive officer. During the lecture he stated to the business students that "...our primary purpose in life is to create value for our shareholders. In order to do that you have to take care of the world".

Hayward stated that his job might be at risk as a result of the spill, saying "we made a few little mistakes early on." He received criticism for various statements he had made during the spill, including telling a camera man to "get out of there" during a photo-op on the shores of Louisiana. On 30 May, he told a reporter "we're sorry for the massive disruption it's caused to their lives. There's no one who wants this thing over more than I do, I'd like my life back." He was widely condemned for his comment which was perceived as selfish, and United States Representative Charlie Melancon (D-La.) called on Hayward to resign in the wake of this comment. He later apologised for the comment on BP America's Facebook Page. On 31 May, Hayward disputed claims of huge underwater plumes of oil suspended in the Gulf, as had been reported by scientists from three universities. Hayward said there was "no evidence" that plumes of oil were suspended under the sea, and that because it is lighter than water any plumes seen are just in the process of rising to the surface. A chemist from Louisiana State University agreed with this assessment. Still other scientists have suggested that the manner of expulsion of the oil from the well and the use of dispersants may have led to an emulsion situation in which the oil is suspended in water for some time.

On 2 June, Hayward and BP released a public video that offered apologies for the spill and its effects, as well as promising to resolve the resulting issues. The video was derided by affected locals and others, who noted that the video did not present any outline of a plan for BP's assistance. Hayward and BP's response to the oil spill, as well as the apology video in particular, were satirized in two episodes ("Coon 2: Hindsight" and "Mysterion Rises") of South Park; the caricature of Hayward condescendingly apologizing later became an Internet meme.

On 5 June the Daily Telegraph reported that Hayward sold approximately one third of his shares in BP a month before the Deepwater Horizon rig exploded. The shares subsequently fell in value by 30%, although the Telegraph stated: "There is no suggestion that he acted improperly or had prior knowledge that the company was to face the biggest setback in its history."

In an interview on NBC on 8 June, US President Barack Obama said that Hayward "wouldn't be working for me after any of those statements", referring to the remarks Hayward made following the spill. The Obama administration had been public in their criticism of BP for the oil spill.

Before a congressional hearing on the oil spill held on 17 June, subcommittee chairman Bart Stupak of Michigan said that he expected Hayward to be "spliced and diced" by both himself and other committee members. Hayward's eleven-page document that he read to the committee included a passage in which he said he would "pledge as leader of BP that we will not stop until we stop this well ... and address economic claims in a responsible manner". He continued, "This is a complex accident, caused by an unprecedented combination of failures. A number of companies are involved, including BP, and it is simply too early to understand the cause."

On 18 June, the day after Hayward appeared before the congressional hearing, the chairman of BP said that Hayward would step away from daily involvement in the company's efforts in the Gulf. On 19 June, the day before Father's Day, Hayward was in Cowes – having taken a "day off" – to see Bob, his co-owned boat, participate in the JP Morgan Asset Management Round the Island yacht race off the Isle of Wight. Rahm Emanuel, President Obama's chief of staff, said that Hayward had committed yet another in a "long line of PR gaffes" by attending the race while the Gulf oil spill continued.

In June, BP put Mississippi native Bob Dudley in charge of handling the Gulf of Mexico oil spill. Dudley was appointed president and chief executive of the newly created Gulf Coast Restoration Organization, reporting to Hayward.

== Departure from BP ==
Following the Deepwater Horizon oil spill, there were rumours that Hayward would resign, but the company dismissed these. A BBC report said that a BP press release stated that Hayward "has the full confidence of the board of directors of BP."

BP announced on 27 July 2010 that Hayward would be replaced by Bob Dudley as the company's chief executive effective as of 1 October 2010.

== CompactGTL ==
In March 2013, Hayward was appointed chairman at UK-based gas-to-liquids company CompactGTL.

== Ongoing protests and controversy ==
Hayward's involvement in Deepwater Horizon left him a highly controversial public figure. In May 2013 he was honoured as a "distinguished leader" by the University of Birmingham, but his award ceremony was interrupted several times by jeers and walk-outs.

In July 2013 his award of an honorary degree from Robert Gordon University was described as "a very serious error of judgement" by Friends of the Earth Scotland.

== Other positions ==
Hayward is chairman of Genel Energy, an oil company with production facilities in Iraqi Kurdistan. Genel Energy was formed in 2011 by the merger of Hayward's venture firm Vallares with the Turkish oil firm Genel Enerji.

Hayward was a member of the Citibank advisory board, from 2000 to 2003. Hayward is presently senior independent non-executive director of Corus Group, appointed in April 2002, and a non-executive director of Tata Steel. Hayward is a committee member of Audit, Nominations and Health, Safety and Environment. Hayward was appointed a Companion of the Chartered Management Institute in September 2005.
