= Margaritaville (South Park) =

- South Park episode
- Episode no.: Season 13; Episode 3
- Directed by: Trey Parker
- Written by: Trey Parker
- Production code: 1303
- Original air date: March 25, 2009

Episode chronology
← Previous "The Coon"	Next → "Eat, Pray, Queef"
- South Park season 13

"Margaritaville" is the third episode of the thirteenth season of the American animated television series South Park. The 184th overall episode of the series, it originally aired on Comedy Central in the United States on March 25, 2009, as an Easter special. The episode is a satire and commentary on the global recession affecting much of the industrialized world at the time of the episode's broadcast. Kyle Broflovski is portrayed as a Jesus-like savior working to save the economy, and Stan Marsh spends much of the episode trying to return a personal Jimmy Buffett Margaritaville machine.

The episode was written and directed by series co-creator Trey Parker, and it was rated TV-MA L in the United States. Parker and Stone long planned to create an episode about the economy and considered making it the season premiere, but decided they needed more time to craft the script, and they instead opened the season with "The Ring", a spoof of the Jonas Brothers boy band. In their original idea for an economy episode, Parker and Stone considered having Cartman dress as a superhero who fights the economy. That idea was ultimately scrapped, and elements were transferred to the season's second episode, "The Coon".

"Margaritaville" reflected Parker and Stone's belief that most Americans view the economy in the same way as religion, in that it is seldom understood but seen as an important, elusive entity. The Margaritaville blender featured in the episode serves as a metaphor for American consumerism, as well as the housing bubble. The script proved challenging for Parker and Stone, and they did not finish writing it until the night before the episode first aired. Parker and Stone themselves were not entirely pleased with the final episode, although it received generally positive reviews from television critics.

According to Nielsen Media Research, the episode was seen by 2.77 million households in its original airing, making it the most-watched Comedy Central production of the week. "Margaritaville" won the 2009 Emmy Award for Outstanding Animated Program for Programming Less Than One Hour. "Margaritaville" was released on DVD and Blu-ray along with the rest of the thirteenth season on March 16, 2010.

== Plot ==
Randy Marsh has his son Stan deposit $100 into the bank to teach him about saving money, only for it to "disappear" moments later when the bank manager invests the money in a money market mutual fund. After Stan is kicked out of line because it is only for bank members who have money, the same thing happens to an elderly woman. When Randy complains to the manager, his money is transferred from his account into a portfolio with Stan and the manager repeats "Aaaand it's gone!". A recession then hits the nation and South Park.

At dinner, Randy explains to Stan that the economy is failing due to people spending their money on luxuries. He continues his hypocritical tirade while making himself a margarita in a Margaritaville-brand mixer, the noise of which drowns out his voice for part of the tirade.

People in South Park are struggling with the recent economic downturn, and many people on the street are castigating those whom they would blame. Eric Cartman blames the Jews, claiming they hid the money in a "Jew Cave", but Randy convinces everyone to reduce their spending to only the "bare essentials" in order to propitiate the Economy, justifying his own frivolous purchase by adding that the essentials include margaritas. His recommended changes make the town resemble first-century Galilee.

Kyle Broflovski becomes annoyed, responding that the Economy is not actually angry with them, and that they should be out spending money, and continues to preach that the economy only exists as a mental construct, and that people have lost their faith in it because of the recession. He then convinces his friends that if they want the economy to be strong, they must have faith in it. Upon hearing of this heresy, Randy and his makeshift economic council decide that they must kill Kyle. Cartman, in his desire to obtain a copy of Grand Theft Auto: Chinatown Wars, says that he will deliver Kyle to Randy and his friends in exchange for the game.

In a scene resembling the Last Supper, Kyle and his friends go out for pizza, where he laments that he feels they will not be able to get together like this anymore because he thinks one of his friends will betray him. The next day, Kyle sets up a table with a credit card machine in the town and begins "paying everybody's debts" with his American Express Platinum Card. Kyle's mother begs him to stop because he will be in debt for life, but Kyle feels he must help everybody in the town. After paying for the debts, he passes out and the people carry him to his bed.

Soon enough, the economy improves. Malls and shops start opening for business again, and the now debt free people start purchasing again. Randy is shown buying the new Margaritaville with a salsa dispenser. The news incorrectly acknowledges President Barack Obama for the sacrifices he made and credits him for bringing these improvements in the economy, leaving Kyle flabbergasted.

As a subplot, Stan spends most of the episode trying to return the aforementioned Margaritaville mixer. The trendy retailer Sur La Table will not accept the return because it was bought on a payment plan, and as Stan tries to find out to whom he can return it, for each person to tell him the debt has been packaged and sold to someone else (much like real-life mortgage-backed securities). Eventually, he goes all the way to the United States Treasury, where a group of associates "consult the charts" and tell him the mixer is worth $90 trillion. As Stan questions this, one of the treasury workers announces that another insurance company is failing and asks what they should do. They decide they have to "consult the charts" again, and Stan follows them inside to a round lit-up game show style board, where the men cut off a chicken's head and let the decapitated chicken run on the board while one of them plays a tune (similar to "Yakety Sax") on a kazoo. The chicken falls on the "bailout!" spot, so that is what the men do. Angered by the farcical nature of the system, Stan smashes the mixer on the platform by the chicken's body and walks off.

== Production ==
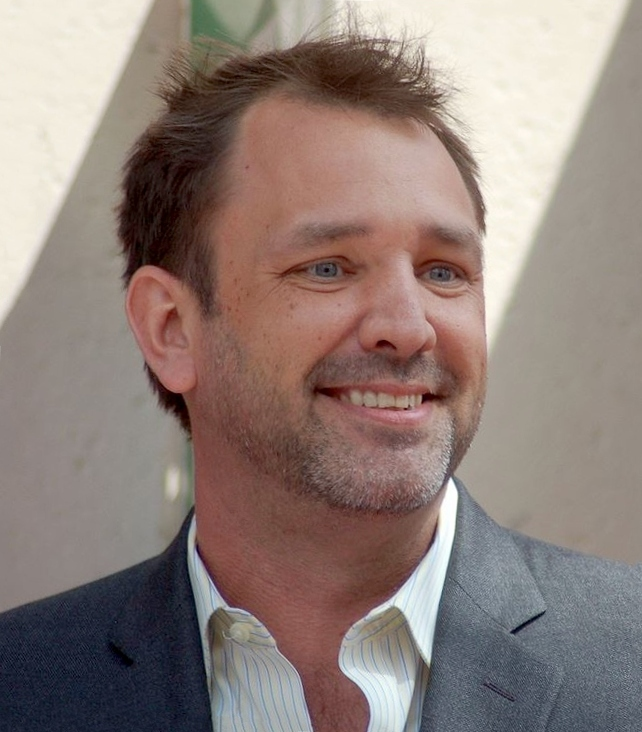
South Park co-creator Trey Parker wrote "Margaritaville"

"Margaritaville" was written and directed by series co-founder Trey Parker. It first aired on March 25, 2009, in the United States on Comedy Central. Parker and fellow co-creator Matt Stone said they had long planned to do an episode about the global recession, and they argued over whether to start the season with an episode about the economy, or "The Ring", an episode mocking the Jonas Brothers, a boy band which had recently grown in popularity. Stone argued the season premiere should focus on the economy because it was the biggest news item at the time, but Parker felt they needed more time to craft the script, and that the Jonas Brothers would be a funny season opener. Stone ultimately agreed, and later admitted it was the right decision. During an interview a few weeks before the episode aired, Stone said, "That's one of those big things we want to get right. We'll be talking about what kind of social commentary we want to make and do it right".

Parker and Stone originally planned for their economy-related episode to involve Cartman dressing as a superhero named "The Coon" and fighting the recession. Eventually, Cartman would discover the recession stemmed from the sale of Jimmy Buffett's Margaritaville blenders, and he would have to battle singer-songwriter Jimmy Buffett and investor Warren Buffett, who would be portrayed as Jimmy's brother. Eventually, the idea was scrapped, and the superhero elements were incorporated into the episode "The Coon", which aired just before "Margaritaville". The opening scene of "The Coon", in which Cartman discussed the poor economic state of the nation and the election of U.S. President Barack Obama, were left remnants of the original economy-related idea. Certain elements of the original idea, such as the Margaritaville blenders, were eventually incorporated into "Margaritaville".

As with most South Park episodes, Parker, Stone, and their team created the episode within a week of its broadcast date. The script was not finished until late March 24, the night before the episode aired. "Margaritaville" featured a 70-second shot which panned over several characters speaking about the recession on pedestals before finally settling on Randy wearing robes and preaching about the economy. It was the longest shot in South Park history to that point, although it would be surpassed later in the season by "Dances with Smurfs", which featured an 86-second single shot in which a South Park elementary student is murdered while reading the morning announcements.

== Theme ==
[The script] was one of those things where we just kept talking around it and around it, trying to figure out what it was. And we had this idea for a long time how the economy is really like religion and how it's all based on faith. If you have faith, it exists, and if you don't, it doesn't.

— Trey Parker,
South Park co-creator

"Margaritaville" is a satire and commentary on the global recession affecting much of the industrialized world at the time of the episode's broadcast on March 25, 2009. Parker and Stone believed many viewed the economy as an important, elusive entity without truly understanding how it works, and felt it mirrored faith in religion. The duo had difficulty writing the script due to their limited familiarity with religion and Christian history, and they relied heavily on executive producer Anne Garefino for help. In describing the economic elements of the episode, they sought assistance from Stone's father, who works as an economist. The scenes in which Stan explains how his Margaritaville blender was purchased on a payment plan that was eventually combined into securities sold to the banks required particular assistance from Stone's father. Parker said the dialogue proved so difficult, they were working on the script right up until the night before the episode was first broadcast.

The Margaritaville blender itself served as a metaphor for consumerism and the tendency of Americans to buy luxuries that they do not need. Stone said, "We didn't want to make an episode where it was like, 'Oh, those Wall Street guys took our money.' It was one of those things where we all screwed up and nobody really knows what's going on, but it has something to do with buying shit like Margaritavilles." The Margaritaville also serves as a metaphor for the housing bubble. Parker himself actually owns a Margaritaville, of which he said, "It's pretty stupid because it really is just a blender".

== Cultural references ==
Kyle is portrayed as a Jesus-like savior of the economy, and his dinner with friends (bottom) resembles The Last Supper painting by Leonardo da Vinci (top)

The episode's title comes from the Jimmy Buffett's Margaritaville blender featured in the episode, which serves as a metaphor for the housing bubble. "Margaritaville" is also the name of a popular 1977 song by Jimmy Buffett, who has been the butt of South Park humor in the past. In "Margaritaville", Kyle is portrayed as a Jesus-like savior who makes a tremendous sacrifice to save the economy. A dinner he has with his friends is portrayed as the Last Supper, the final meal Jesus had with his Twelve Apostles before his death. Cartman takes on the role of Judas Iscariot, the disciple who betrayed Jesus (in the Last Supper scene he even sits in the same position as Judas in da Vinci's painting), while some of the South Park residents form a council. Kyle uses a platinum American Express card to pay off the debts of all South Park residents.

Cartman says he wants the soon-to-be-released Grand Theft Auto: Chinatown Wars game for the handheld game console Nintendo DS. The game was released within a week of the original "Margaritaville" broadcast date. Representatives from game developer Rockstar Games told video game blog Kotaku they liked the reference, and did not know in advance it would be in the episode.

== Reception ==
Parker and Stone themselves were not entirely pleased with the final result of "Margaritaville". Although they liked the idea, they felt the main storyline involving the economy and the subplot involving Stan and the Margaritaville blender did not come together in the end as the duo originally hoped they would when they started writing the script. Parker said of the episode, "I give the concept on this an A, and the execution like a C−". In its original American broadcast, "Margaritaville" was watched by 2.77 million overall households, according to the Nielsen Media Research, making it the most-watched Comedy Central production of the week. The episode received generally positive reviews from television critics. Ken Tucker of Entertainment Weekly said of the episode, "The episode was the most back-handed endorsement imaginable of President Obama's economic bailout plan. Or the most withering dismantling of it. As usual, South Park had it both ways". Tucker also said of Cartman's blaming the Jews for the recession, "Among its many achievements, South Park has exposed anti-Semitism to such relentless ridicule over the years, it deserves some sort of humanitarian award".

Financial writer Roger Nusbaum said the episode was not only "humorous" but provided a decent analysis of the recession. He particularly praised Randy's inclusion of margaritas with the barest of necessities; Nusbaum said most people tend to take on absurd expenses that they fail to realize are unnecessary, even as they discuss the plight of the economy. Brad Trechak of HuffPostTV called "Margaritaville" a highlight of the season. Mike Fahey of Kotaku said the episode had "a clever little plot". Zac Bissonnette of BloggingStocks said of the episode, "It isn't quite as trenchant as some of the other Wall Street satire that's been making the rounds, but it's definitely worth watching". Carlos Delgado of If-magazine said the episode included many excellent moments, including the headless chicken method of making economic decisions, but otherwise felt "Margaritaville" was not as strong as previous episodes like "The Ring". Delgado said, "Maybe I'm too depressed about the current economic situation, who knows, but although 'Margaritaville' was well-written and poignant, I wasn't bursting out in laughter every two minutes".

In 2016, the episode was highlighted in the academic journal Religions.

The segment in which the bankteller says "Aaand... it's gone" has become a popular internet meme.

Catholic Answers apologist and speaker Trent Horn has referenced the episode as an accurate depiction of the satisfaction theory of atonement, with Kyle representing Jesus taking all of the town's debt upon himself

== Emmy Award ==
Parker and Stone decided to submit "Margaritaville" for an Emmy Award because they had received a large amount of positive feedback about the episode from adults and older viewers. Since most Emmy voters are older, they decided "Margaritaville" stood the best chance of winning. Stone joked, "If an Emmy voter were to watch this, they might think the show was smarter than it was, so they might be fooled into voting for us". "Margaritaville" ultimately won the 2009 Emmy Award for Outstanding animated Program for Programming less than one Hour. It competed against Robot Chicken, The Simpsons, and American Dad! at the 61st Primetime Emmy Awards, which was held September 12, 2009.

== Home media ==
"Margaritaville", along with the thirteen other episodes from South Park's thirteenth season, were released on a three-disc DVD set and two-disc Blu-ray set in the United States on March 16, 2010. The sets included brief audio commentaries by Parker and Stone for each episode, a collection of deleted scenes, and a special mini-feature Inside Xbox: A Behind-the-Scenes Tour of South Park Studios, which discussed the process behind animating the show with Inside Xbox host Major Nelson.
