= Coon vs. Coon and Friends =

- South Park episode
- Episode no.: Season 14; Episode 13
- Directed by: Trey Parker
- Written by: Trey Parker
- Production code: 1413
- Original air date: November 10, 2010

Episode chronology
← Previous "Mysterion Rises"	Next → "Crème Fraîche"
- South Park season 14

"Coon vs. Coon and Friends" is the thirteenth episode of the fourteenth season and the 208th overall episode of Comedy Central's series South Park. It originally aired on November 10, 2010; and was written and directed by series co-creator Trey Parker.

In its original American broadcast on November 10, 2010, "Coon vs. Coon and Friends" was watched by 3.249 million viewers, according to the Nielsen Media Research. It was the highest viewed scripted show. It received a 1.9 rating/5% share among adult viewers between ages 18 and 49.

In this episode, Cartman shows himself to be even more evil than the dark lord, Cthulhu, as he punishes his former partners in Coon & Friends. Kenny is wrestling with the weight of his own super power through his alter-ego, Mysterion.

The episode continues from previous South Park episodes "Coon 2: Hindsight" and "Mysterion Rises" and reveals the identities of all of Coon and Friends.

The episode was rated TV-MA-LV in the United States.

== Plot ==
The boys raise concern over Mint Berry Crunch's super powers. Mysterion boldly states that "I can't die." In an attempt to prove his point, Mysterion pulls out a handgun and shoots himself in the head. Despite their initial shock, the boys strangely forget Mysterion's death ever occurred after he returns which leaves him upset.

Cartman orders Cthulhu to banish the heroes to R'lyeh. In order to leave the city, Mysterion commits suicide by jumping into a pit of deadly spikes. Kenny awakens back in his bed and dons his Mysterion outfit, setting off to learn more about Cthulhu and his own powers in order to save his friends. He discovers that Cthulhu can only be killed by another immortal.

Followed by Mint Berry Crunch, Mysterion finds Cthulhu at a Justin Bieber concert, having just killed the musician. Mysterion offers Cthulhu an easy win if he brings his friends back, believing himself to be immortal due to a recurring gag in the show in which Kenny is repeatedly killed. A bright light descends from the air as Cthulhu departs, and a man appears inside, who explains that he is from a faraway planet, and sent his son to Earth to stop evil from taking over the Earth using the “power of mint and berries with a satisfying crunch”. Bradley drags Cthulhu back to the dimension from which he came, saving the other heroes. Mysterion, disappointed that he did not learn anything about his true past and identity, says he is going to bed and shoots himself in the head. That night, his mother gives birth to another new baby Kenny. After placing the newborn Kenny in his bed, his parents lament ever going to "that stupid cult meeting."

== Reception ==
=== Broadcast and ratings ===
In its original American broadcast on November 10, 2010, "Coon vs. Coon and Friends" was watched by 2.786 million viewers, according to Nielsen Media Research, making it the most watched cable television show of the night, surpassing shows such as Psych, Terriers, Meet the Browns and The Ultimate Fighter in ratings. The episode received a 1.8 rating/3 share, meaning it was seen by 1.8 percent of the population, and 3 percent of people watching television at the time of its broadcast. Among male viewers between ages 18 and 34, the episode received a 3.4 rating/11 share. Among adult viewers between ages 18 and 49, the episode received a 1.6 rating/5 share, falling two tenths in the ratings since the last episode.

=== Critical response ===
The episode received mostly positive reviews. IGN gave the episode a "great" score of 8.0 and said "The Coon and Friends trilogy comes to an end in grand fashion, with epic battles, strange alliances, and secret origins revealed. It's a tale told in the finest comic book traditions, and it's one of the most creative episodes South Park has produced recently." The A.V. Club gave the episode a B+, a vast improvement over the C and C+ rating given to Coon 2: Hindsight and Mysterion Rises, stating that the episode was "fleeter and funnier, it wasted less time on padded-out tangents, and it satisfactorily resolved the question of Kenny's immortality" and called the episode "as well-executed an ending as one could probably hope for here". Eric Hochberger of TV Fanatic gave the episode a score of 4 out of 5, calling it an "entertaining, fitting finish", stating that it "dropped all the things we hated about the first two parts" and delivered a "solid, fun half hour", praising the twist ending, the portrayal of Cartman and how he "believed he truly was making the world a better place", as well as the death of Justin Bieber.

== Home media ==
"Coon vs. Coon and Friends", along with the thirteen other episodes from South Park's fourteenth season, were released on a three-disc DVD set and two-disc Blu-ray set in the United States on April 26, 2011.
