= Oil and Gas Climate Initiative =

Consortium of petroleum industry companies

The Oil and Gas Climate Initiative (OGCI), is an international industry-led organization which includes 12 member companies from the oil and gas industry: BP, Chevron, CNPC, Eni, Equinor, ExxonMobil, Occidental, Petrobras, Repsol, Saudi Aramco, Shell and TotalEnergies represent over "30% of global operated oil and gas production." It was established in 2014 and has a mandate to work together to "accelerate the reduction of greenhouse gas emissions" in full support of the Paris Agreement and its aims."

Their mandate says that they will "seek actions" to "accelerate and participate in the energy transition." On November 4, 2016 OGCI announced the creation of the OGCI Climate Investments fund which will invest $1 billion over 10 years in companies or projects that reduce "methane emissions from gas production", on projects or "technologies to capture and either use or store carbon emissions", as well as on energy efficiency.

The fund invests in reducing the carbon footprint of the oil and gas industry and other emitting sectors, rather than in renewable energy. Former BP CEO Bob Dudley is the chair of the OGCI CEO steering committee and Bjørn Otto Sverdrup is the chair of the OGCI executive committee. Pratima Rangarajan is the CEO of OGCI Climate Investments.

== Background ==
The industry-led Oil and Gas Climate Initiative (OGCI) was created in 2014 by CEOs of the world's largest energy companies to "seek action" to support the Paris Agreement. The member companies which include BP, Chevron, CNPC, Eni, Equinor, ExxonMobil, Occidental, Pemex, Petrobras, Repsol, Saudi Aramco, Shell and Total, represent over "32% of global operated oil and gas production."

As part of their initiative to "improve their environmental reputation" the OGCI announced at an event held in London, that they would be investing $1bn over the next decade in "innovative low emissions technologies". The announcement, which was planned to "coincide" with the Paris Agreement which came into effect on the same day. The Telegraph had predicted that the OGCI could face "fierce scrutiny and accusations of "greenwashing" for the announcement which some environmentalists saying that "the 'big oil' business model is fundamentally incompatible with avoiding dangerous climate change." The Telegraph said that OGCI chair and BP CEO Bob Dudley makes more than 1 billion a year.

On September 22, 2019, the OGCI hosted an "invitation-only forum" on the "sidelines" of the September 23, climate action summit organized by the UN secretary general, António Guterres, which was held in New York. The day before the UN "climate action summit"—which included "[W]orld leaders, academics, government representatives and environmentalists" came together for The UN "climate action summit"—OGCI oil and gas executives held their own "closed high-level discussion" with key stakeholders. According to The Guardian, critics said that the OGCI was "attempt[ing] to influence negotiations in favour of fossil fuel companies."

On September 23, the OGCI held their formal forum at the Morgan Library and Museum, New York.

== Targets ==
In 2017, OGCI members developed a baseline of "aggregated upstream oil and gas operations emissions" of 24 kg CO2e/boe.

=== Methane intensity ===
In 2018, OGCI set a methane intensity target. In 2018, member companies had "reduced collective methane intensity by 9%" and was "on track to meet the 2025 target of below 0.25%."

=== Carbon intensity ===
At their September 2019 forum, OGCI said that they were "working on a carbon intensity target to reduce by 2025 the collective average carbon intensity of member companies' aggregated upstream oil and gas operations." Among the actions to meet their targets of reducing carbon intensity, the OGCI listed "improving energy efficiency, minimizing flaring, upgrading facilities and co-generating electricity and useful heat."

==== Carbon pricing ====
Member companies pledged to "support policies that attribute an explicit or implicit value to carbon" as "one of the most cost-efficient ways to achieve the low carbon transition as early as possible" at their September 2019 forum.

=== Reduce flaring ===
By October 2019, the fossil-fuel executives said that until recently they had been making progress in cutting back on routine flaring, where vast amounts of natural gas are burned off as a waste "by-product" during the extraction of crude oil. Oil extraction companies focus on drilling and pumping oil which is highly lucrative, but the less-valuable gas accompanying the oil is more difficult to transport to consumers. Production growth has "far outpaced pipeline construction" during the boom in the Permian and Bakken oil fields.

Both gas flaring and gas venting waste a primary energy resource and release potent greenhouse gases into the atmosphere. Regulation of the amount of each type of waste varies from one jurisdiction to another. Instances also occur where companies have access to transport capacity, but are allowed to flare rather than pay pipeline costs.

As part of its flaring efforts, OGCI is also a member of Methane Guiding Principles, an industry consortium that aims to reduce methane emissions—including from flaring—from the energy supply chain.

== Investments ==
The OGCI Climate Investments fund will not invest in renewables. It will focus on action that will reduce "methane emissions from gas production" and on "technologies to capture and either use or store carbon emissions. At their New York September 2019 forum, OGCI said that they had " 15 investments in its portfolio," which includes Kelvin, SeekOps, Boston Metal, 75F, Norsepower, and XL. OGCI Climate Investments focus on "innovative companies that are ready to be commercialized" in collaboration with "global co-investors and industrials to achieve speed and scale."

=== Wabash Valley Resources ===
On May 20, 2019 OGCI announced their funding support of the Terre Haute, Indiana-based Wabash Valley Resources that will "capture and sequester 1.5-1.75 million tons of CO2 annually from Wabash Valley Resources co-located ammonia plant" making it "the largest carbon sequestration project in the United States".

=== SeekOps ===
In September 2019, OGCI Climate Investments and Equinor Technology Ventures provided funding for SeekOps, which is a "technology spinoff NASA's Jet Propulsion Laboratory". SeekOps uses "integrated drone-based systems" capable of detect[ing], localiz[ing], and "quanify[ing] natural gas emissions.

== Initiatives ==
In September 2019, OGCI announced a KickStarter campaign to increase the "carbon capture, use and storage (CCUS)" globally to "achieve net zero emissions."
