= Jacqueline Hurst =

British teacher and author

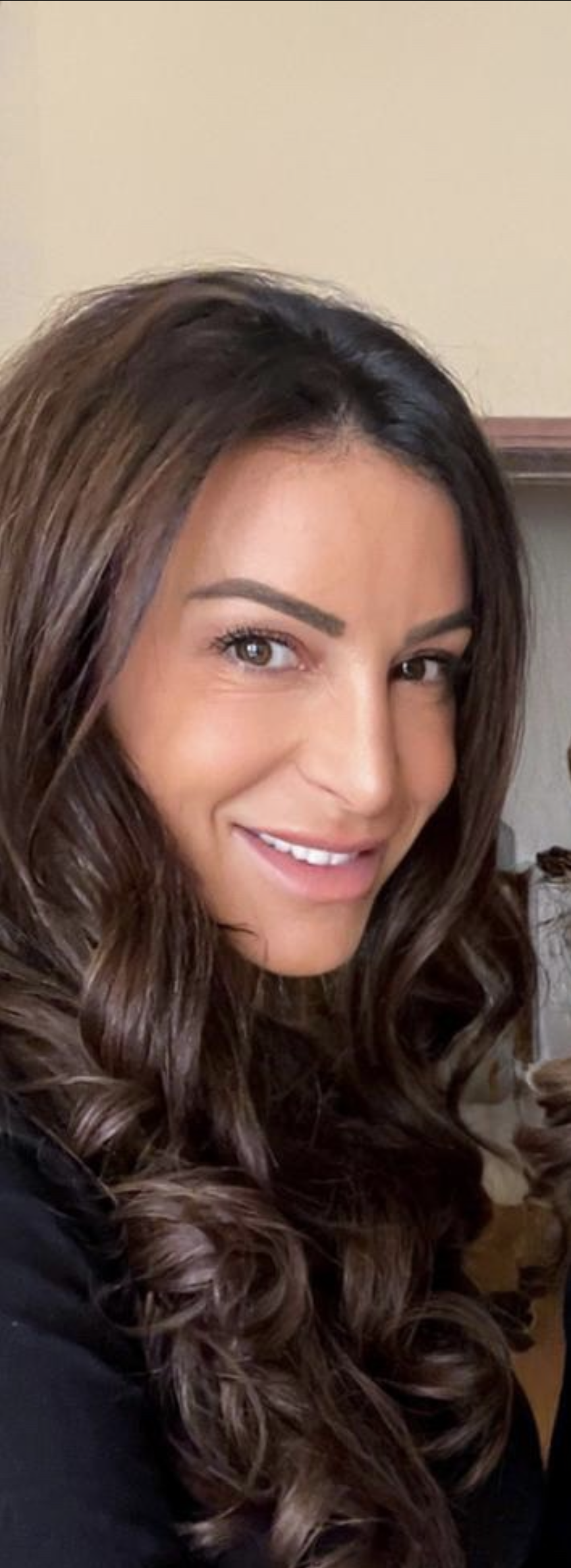
- Born: London
- Education: Bennett Stellar University
- Occupations: Teacher, columnist for GQ Magazine, and author
- Spouse: Bernard Looney (m. 2017; div. 2019)
- Website: www.jacquelinehurst.com

Jacqueline Lisa Hurst (born December 1977) is a British teacher, author and columnist for GQ Magazine. She is the founder of The Life Class, a personal development school focused on emotional intelligence, personal insight, and meaningful change.

Hurst began her career as a life coach in London's Mayfair, working with clients on relationships, anxiety, confidence, life transitions, stress management and burnout. After more than two decades of working privately with individuals, she transitioned her work into a teaching model through The Life Class, where she delivers courses, talks and programmes focused on personal development and self-understanding.

She has been quoted in the media including The Sunday Times, The Telegraph, Harper's Bazaar and The Times. Hurst has cited influences including the teachings of Byron Katie, Eckhart Tolle, Marianne Williamson and Wayne Dyer.

In 2021, television presenter Gregg Wallace credited Hurst with helping him manage anxiety before appearing on the BBC programme Strictly Come Dancing.

== Bibliography ==
- Hurst, Jacqueline (3 July 2021). How To Do You: The Life Changing Art of Mastering Your Thoughts and Taking Control of Your Life. Independently Published. p. 245. ISBN 979-8528949147.
