= The Ring (South Park) =

- South Park episode
- Episode no.: Season 13; Episode 1
- Directed by: Trey Parker
- Written by: Trey Parker
- Production code: 1301
- Original air date: March 11, 2009

Guest appearance
- Mickey Ramos as Tammy Warner

Episode chronology
← Previous "The Ungroundable"	Next → "The Coon"
- South Park season 13

"The Ring" is the thirteenth season premiere of the American animated television series South Park. The 182nd overall episode of the series, it first aired on Comedy Central in the United States on March 11, 2009. In the episode, Kenny and his new girlfriend are encouraged by the Jonas Brothers to wear purity rings, which is secretly a marketing tactic by Disney to sell sex to young girls.

The episode was written and directed by series co-creator Trey Parker and is rated TV-MA-L in the United States. It was the first South Park episode to premiere in 16:9 and high definition. Parker and Stone were not very familiar with the Jonas Brothers before they wrote "The Ring", which was inspired by the recent release of Jonas Brothers: The 3D Concert Experience. The two argued over whether to open the season with this episode or an episode focusing on the economic recession ("Margaritaville"), but eventually decided they needed more time to craft a script for the latter.

"The Ring" mocks Disney, depicted as a corporation led by a foul mouthed and sadistic Mickey Mouse, who is using the ruse of family-friendly morals to disguise their primary motive of selling lust to young girls for profit. The episode received generally positive reviews, and according to Nielsen Media Research, was seen by 3.41 million viewers the week it was broadcast. The publicist for the Jonas Brothers specifically forbade reporters from asking the band about the episode; although Nick Jonas said they did not watch it, he did say it was an honor to be included in the show. "The Ring" was released on DVD and Blu-ray along with the rest of the thirteenth season on March 16, 2010.

== Plot ==
All the other boys are amazed that Kenny has a girlfriend: fifth grader Tammy Warner (Mickey Ramos), (who is evidently the only child whose family is more poor than Kenny's), though Butters hears a rumor that Tammy is a "notorious slut": as she gave another male student a "BJ" (blowjob) in a TGI Fridays parking lot. Hoping to spare Kenny's feelings, Stan, Kyle, and Cartman decide to warn him, though Kenny reacts gleefully to the news: and proceeds to invite Tammy to TGI Fridays after school, whereupon she confesses and confirms the rumor. Ignorant to his delight, Tammy explains that she became aroused after watching the Jonas Brothers perform, and thus Kenny deduces he must take Tammy to a Jonas Brothers concert at the Pepsi Center. His friends are disgusted by Kenny's promiscuity; Cartman claims that "the most bacteria-ridden place on the planet is the mouth of an American woman."

After the concert, Tammy and several other girls are invited backstage, assuming the Jonas Brothers want to have sex with them. Instead, they convince the girls to wear purity rings as a pledge to abstinence, and tell them to get all of their friends to start wearing them as well because, as Nick Jonas says, "That's just how we roll" (a reference to one of their songs, "That's Just the Way We Roll"). To appease his girlfriend, Kenny reluctantly begins wearing a purity ring. As Kenny subsequently becomes dull and ceases spending time with his friends, it is revealed that the Jonas Brothers' fearsome, greedy, sadistic, and foul-mouthed boss, Mickey Mouse, is forcing them to wear and promote purity rings in order to "sell sex to little girls", verbally berating them when they complain that the rings are overshadowing their music and projecting the wrong message. Mickey even brutally assaults Joe Jonas after he and his brothers threaten to refuse performing due to Mickey's demands that they wear and promote the rings, explaining that the rings allow him to sell sexual stimulation to young girls while falsely promoting innocence and purity. Concerned for Kenny, Stan, Kyle, and Cartman attempt to confront the Jonas Brothers at a televised appearance in Denver (in which the Jonas Brothers douse the audience of young girls with "white foam") about their purity ring and sex influences, but Mickey, mistaking the boys for secret agents hired by either DreamWorks or Michael Eisner to sabotage the televised appearance, tranquilizes them and takes them prisoner backstage.

When the boys reawaken backstage at the televised Jonas Brothers' 3D concert spectacular at Red Rocks Amphitheatre, Mickey interrogates them and eventually threatens them with a chainsaw, refusing to believe they are not working for another company. As Mickey once again rants about his true intentions, this time insulting the Jonas Brothers' fans and Christians, Kyle stealthily switches on one of the microphones and Cartman also raises the curtain, broadcasting Mickey's rant to both the concert-goers and the national television audience. When Mickey realizes that the curtains are raised and everyone heard him, the crowd turns on him and the Jonas Brothers leave the stage in a huff. An enraged Mickey inflates, begins blowing fire and destroying most of Denver. Tammy and Kenny remove their purity rings, and Tammy suggests they go to TGI Fridays, greatly exciting Kenny.

The show immediately cuts to Kenny's funeral, where the audience learns that he contracted syphilis after receiving a BJ from Tammy and died as a result. As the episode closes, Cartman restates how the mouth of an American woman is "the most bacteria-ridden place on the planet".

== Production ==
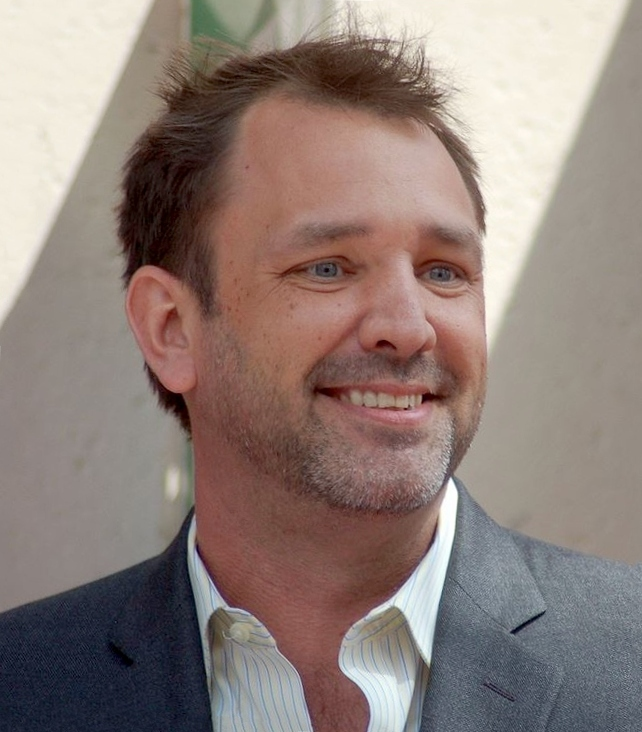
South Park co-creator Trey Parker wrote "The Ring"

"The Ring" was written and directed by series co-founder Trey Parker. It was first broadcast on March 11, 2009 in the United States on Comedy Central, and then aired two days later on satellite Paramount Comedy in the United Kingdom. It was the first episode of South Park's thirteenth season and the first episode to be broadcast in high-definition (HD). Parker and Stone argued over whether to start the season with a Jonas Brothers episode or a show about the economic recession, which they had been planning to do for some time. Stone argued they should focus on the economy because it was the biggest news item at the time, but Parker felt they needed more time to craft the script, and that the Jonas Brothers would be a funny season opener. Stone ultimately agreed, and later admitted it was the right decision. An episode about the economy entitled "Margaritaville" was shown later in the season. By March 8, three days before the episode premiered, the script was only half-finished and the animation was not yet complete, in keeping with the practice of show creators Parker and Matt Stone to finish episodes upon last-minute deadlines; Stone said of the practice, "We don't do a live show, but we kind of harness some of that energy. We kind of need that to work. We're, like, 'We have to do something right now. It's going on the air in just a few minutes.'"

The Jonas Brothers characters were voiced by Parker and Stone, with Parker providing the voices for Kevin and Nick, and Stone voicing Joe, although the two switched characters on some lines. Parker also provides the voice of Mickey Mouse in "The Ring". Parker and Stone were inspired to make the episode by the Jonas Brothers: The 3D Concert Experience film, which was released the previous month. Because they were unfamiliar with the band, they spent a large amount of time watching Jonas Brothers concert clips online, which they found unoriginal and not very enjoyable. Parker said one of the Comedy Central employees told them that after she took her young daughter to see the concert film, the girl said, "Mommy, my giney tickles". Parker thought the story was hilarious and worked the exact line into the episode.

== Theme ==
Reviewers and commentators have described "The Ring" as not just a parody of the Jonas Brothers and their songs (including "S.O.S" and "Burnin' Up"), but also of the ethos of the Walt Disney Company. The episode portrays Disney as a corporation using the ruse of family-friendly morals to disguise their primary motive of profit; reviewers and articles said this point is further illustrated by the use of Mickey Mouse, a cartoon symbol for the wholesome Disney image, as a foul-mouthed, contemptuous, greedy, all-powerful and violent character. Specifically, the episode targets Disney's marketing tactic of having the band members pledge abstinence through purity rings. The script suggests that the rings are used to subliminally sell sex to young girls, while simultaneously appeasing the ethical standards of their parents and taking advantage of their fearful desire to protect their daughters, as Mickey explains in the episode. After watching footage of the Jonas Brothers, Parker and Stone said that they found their embrace of purity rings particularly fascinating, especially since they were simultaneously stirring sexual feelings in young girls.

The episode further illustrates the greed of corporate culture by portraying Mickey as capitalizing on religion for profit, while secretly mocking it in a particularly contemptuous tone: "I've made billions off of Christian ignorance for decades now! And do you know why? Because Christians are retarded! They believe in a talking dead guy!" "The Ring" ends with a tongue-in-cheek cautionary message against engaging in oral sex, depicting Kenny's death from a sexually transmitted disease in the final moments of the episode. When asked whether Stone really believed purity rings were "lame", as they were portrayed in "The Ring", he said, "Well, I don't know. I didn't have one in high school, and I was still lame."

== Cultural references ==
The Jonas Brothers (top) were prominently featured in "The Ring"

The Jonas Brothers are parodied in "The Ring" and play a prominent role in the episode's plot. In a television column written before "The Ring" was broadcast, Lisa de Moraes of The Washington Post suggested Parker and Stone were using the Jonas Brothers in the thirteenth season debut as a means of improving the show's ratings; Comedy Central executives insisted Jonas Brothers fans do not fit into South Park's demographic of males between the ages 18 and 49. The scenes with the Jonas Brothers using hoses to shoot foam into the faces of their female fans were inspired by actual scenes in Jonas Brothers: The 3D Concert Experience. Matt Stone said some viewers found it so unusual they believed the writers made it up themselves. The Walt Disney Company, the Disney Channel and the Mickey Mouse cartoon character are also prominently featured, and spoofed, in the episode; even when Mickey Mouse says callous things or physically assaults people, he follows up most sentences with the character's trademark high-pitched "Ha-ha!" laugh, which in context comes off like a nervous tic.

The show Grey's Anatomy is mocked in "The Ring"; Kenny and Tammy, and the other characters who wear purity rings, develop a strong affinity for the show as they become more boring. (Incidentally several actors and actresses connected to Disney have appeared in the Disney-produced Grey's Anatomy, broadcast on a Disney-owned network.) Those characters also frequently watch movies from Netflix, at that time an online DVD rental service; the company is referenced in one of the episode's semi-parodies of a Jonas Brothers song "I've Got a Ring" (which parodies "SOS"): "Who needs sex and drugs and partying when we can cook a meal and sit around and watch Netflix?" T.G.I. Friday's, a real-life American restaurant chain, is referenced several times as the place where Tammy gave her ex-boyfriend a blowjob. A can of Dr. Pepper appears repeatedly in the South Park Elementary cafeteria; David Hiltgrand of The Philadelphia Inquirer said of the product placement, "I never thought I'd see this type of crass commercialism turn up on South Park, which may be the most brazenly iconoclastic show TV has ever seen."

== Reception ==
In its original American broadcast, "The Ring" was watched by 3.41 million viewers, according to the Nielsen Media Research, making it the second most-watched Comedy Central production of the week, behind the Comedy Central Roast of Larry the Cable Guy, which was seen by 4.08 million viewers. "The Ring" outperformed the March 11 and 12 episodes of The Daily Show, which received wide media coverage due to an ongoing feud between Daily Show host Jon Stewart and CNBC pundit Jim Cramer, who was a guest in the latter episode.

The thirteenth season premiere received generally positive reviews. Entertainment Weekly writer Ken Tucker gave the episode a positive review, showing approval of Kenny's misadventure, saying "thus did South Park ultimately come down on the side of religion and sexual freedom, with lots of big laughs in the bargain.... Trey and Matt are off to a great 13th-season start." James Poniewozik of Time said "The Ring" was better than any of the twelfth season episodes. Poniewozik said the episode, "demonstrated that the cartoon is best when it focuses on the four kids and when it is driven by a white-hot moral fury". Travis Fickett of IGN also particularly applauded the Disney satire, which he said, "elevates this beyond shock humor and into sharp satire." IGN gave the episode an 8.4 score out of 10.

Brad Trechak of TV Squad called "The Ring" a highlight of the season. Josh Modell of The A.V. Club gave the episode an A− grade, although he said it tended to become "heavy-handed" with its moral near the end. Modell said he particularly liked the reactions from the young girls at the Jonas Brothers concert, Kenny's enthusiastic response to his girlfriend's promiscuity and the line from the Jimmy Valmer character: "If you guys found out my girlfriend was a raging whore, I'd want you to tell me." In its list of top television moments for the week, TV Guide listed as number seven a line of dialogue from "The Ring" spoken by Butters: "A ring that says you'll be together but not have sex. Isn't that called a wedding ring?"

Sonny Bunch of The Washington Times said, "The episode was both funny and smart, a wry commentary on the inherent trickiness of marketing a rebellious art form infused with sexuality to children who have no business being sexually active themselves." Tamar Anitai, a blogger for MTV, said the episode was "hilarious". He said "The South Park writers actually appeared to sympathize, if not side with, the Jonas Brothers ... In the end, Disney and Christianity ended up getting a far more severe skewering than the Jonas Brothers." Alan Sepinwall, television writer for The Star-Ledger, said he thought the Mickey Mouse character was used as an effective satirical device for corporate greed, but said he was not particularly impressed with the overall episode because "its targets — the Jonas Brothers, and the Disney company for using them to sell sex to little girls with impunity — were so easy to hit". In contrast, Parents Television Council (PTC), criticized the episode for such elements, and they named this episode the "Worst Cable Content of the Week".

According to a news report by Canwest News Service, the Jonas Brothers' publicist specifically forbade reporters from asking the band members about the South Park episode. Nick Jonas told the Orlando Sentinel that the band had not seen the episode: "We are always open to make fun of ourselves. For us, we're so focused on what we're doing with this tour and our album, we didn't have much time to see it."

In two separate 2016 AMAs on Reddit, both Nick Jonas and Joe Jonas reflected on the episode. "When it first came out I didn't think it was funny to be honest, but probably because I was actually living all of that in real time, so it just made it harder to come and live your life as a young person and have all that going on," Nick said. "But years later and once the purity rings were no longer around, it was very funny to me and I've actually watched the episode a few times." "I loved it. When it first came out I was so pumped". Joe said. "I know that Nick was really kind of not into watching it, but I thought it was the funniest thing at the time and it's kind of a compliment because obviously if you go to a comedy show and they pick you out and make fun of you, you can't heckle back, you gotta just take it and enjoy it, and for me I've always been a fan and I knew that was kind of a wow we made it moment, and also they were kind of attacking Disney more than me, so I didn't really feel threatened. Now I watch it back and laugh and Mickey kicked my ass so I won the episode by being beat up by Mickey Mouse."

== Home release ==
"The Ring", along with the thirteen other episodes from South Park's thirteenth season, were released on a three-disc DVD set and two-disc Blu-ray set in the United States on March 16, 2010. The sets included brief audio commentaries by Parker and Stone for each episode, a collection of deleted scenes, and a special mini-feature Inside Xbox: A Behind-the-Scenes Tour of South Park Studios, which discussed the process behind animating the show with Inside Xbox host Major Nelson.

== See also ==
- "Obama Wins!", another episode featuring the Mickey Mouse character
- "Band In China", another episode featuring the Mickey Mouse character
