= Bob Dudley =

American-born businessman

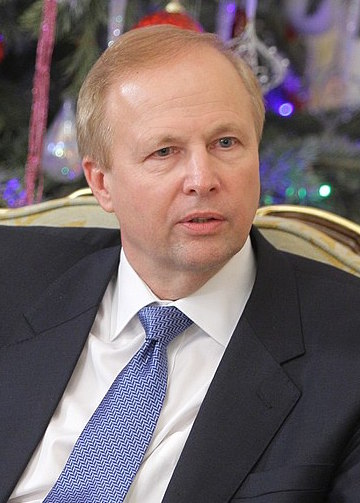

Chief Executive Officer of BP
- In office 2010–2020
- Preceded by: Tony Hayward
- Succeeded by: Bernard Looney

Personal details
- Born: September 14, 1955 (age 70) Queens, New York, U.S.
- Citizenship: United Kingdom; United States
- Spouse: Mary Dudley
- Education: Hinsdale Central High School
- Alma mater: University of Illinois; Thunderbird School of Global Management; Southern Methodist University
- Occupation: Businessman
- Known for: Former CEO of BP

Robert Warren Dudley (born September 14, 1955) is an American businessman who is a former group chief executive of BP. He had been president and chief executive of TNK-BP and on June 18, 2010, was assigned to be BP executive in charge of the Gulf Coast Restoration Organization responding to the Deepwater Horizon oil spill. He is the chair of the international industry-led Oil and Gas Climate Initiative (OGCI). He is a former board member of Rosneft, the Russian state-owned energy giant.

== Early life ==
Dudley was born in Queens, New York, grew up in Hattiesburg, Mississippi, and graduated from Hinsdale Central High School in suburban Chicago in 1973. He received a bachelor's degree in chemical engineering from the University of Illinois, where he joined the fraternity Phi Kappa Psi and served as District 3 Archon. He then obtained a master of international management (MIM) degree from the Thunderbird School of Global Management (now part of Arizona State University) and an MBA from Southern Methodist University.

== Career ==
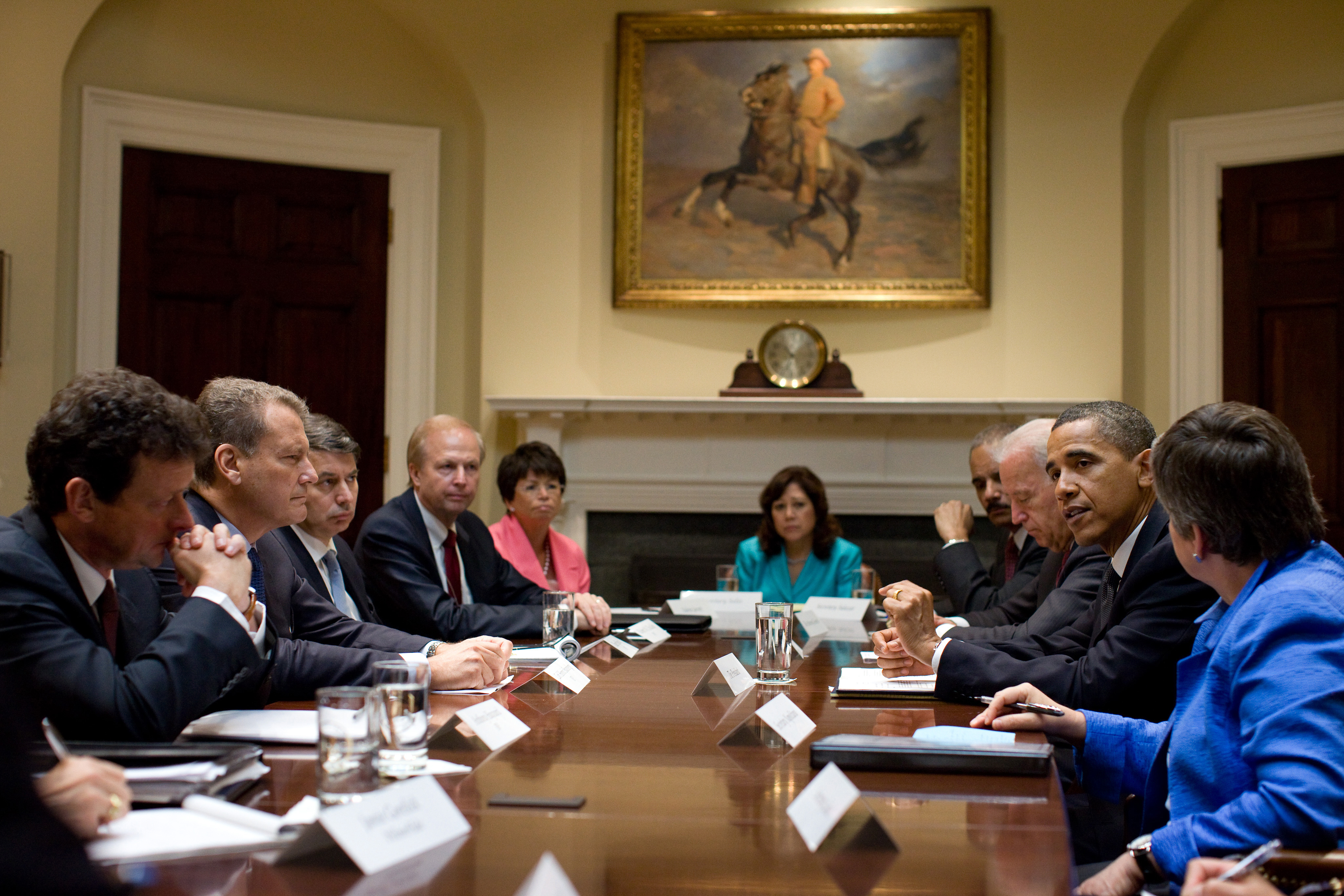
U.S. President Barack Obama meets BP executives in the Roosevelt Room of the White House, June 16, 2010. Pictured, from left, are BP CEO Tony Hayward, BP Chairman Carl-Henric Svanberg, BP General Counsel Rupert Bondy, BP Managing Director Robert Dudley, Senior Advisor Valerie Jarrett, Labor Secretary Hilda Solis, Attorney General Eric Holder, Vice President Joe Biden, President Obama, and Homeland Security Secretary Janet Napolitano.

Dudley joined Amoco in 1979. He worked in a variety of positions including negotiating deals in the South China Sea. He worked in the oil industry for a long time including Amoco in Moscow from 1994 to 1997. He became a general manager for strategy. After BP acquired Amoco he assumed a similar position at BP.

From 2003 to 2008, he was president and chief executive of TNK-BP. He was appointed when BP went into partnership with a group of Russian billionaires known as AAR. The deal was worth $6 billion (£3.6 billion at the time). Under Dudley, the joint venture increased oil output by a third to 1.6 million barrels per day. However, he fell out with AAR, who accused him of favouring BP. Disputes escalated and reached a point where BP's technical staff were barred from working in Russia. In June 2008, Bob Dudley left Russia in haste when his visa was not renewed. At the time, he said he had faced "sustained harassment" from the Russian authorities. For five months, he attempted to run TNK-BP from an undisclosed secret location outside Russia but resigned in December 2008. Wikileaks revealed that Bob Dudley strongly suspected Igor Sechin, Russia’s deputy prime minister and chairman of the state-owned energy company, Rosneft, for organizing a boardroom coup that led him to feel life-threatened.

On April 6, 2009 he became a managing director of BP, and was given oversight of the company's activities in the Americas and Asia.

On June 23, 2010 he was appointed president and chief executive officer of BP's Gulf Coast Restoration Organization working with the oil leakage in the Gulf of Mexico, which affected five US states. As head of the organization, he was responsible for the cleaning work in the Gulf, the cooperation with authorities, informing the public about BP's activities surrounding the disaster and analyzing the damage caused by the disaster.

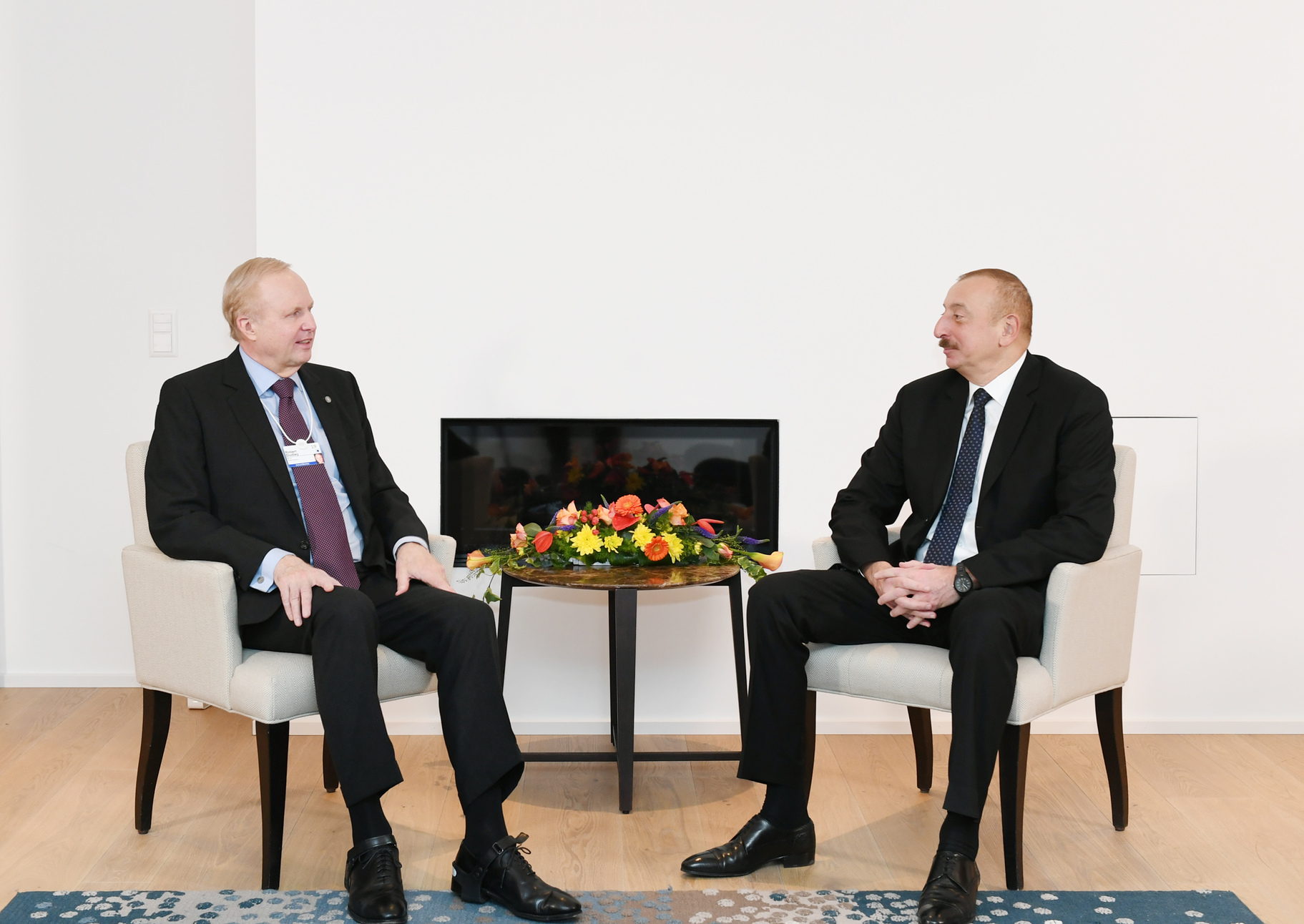
Dudley meeting with Azerbaijan's President Ilham Aliyev in 2019

On July 27, 2010, BP announced that Dudley would succeed Tony Hayward as their group chief executive on October 1, 2010. Dudley was also appointed to the board of directors.

In March 2013, Dudley was offered a seat on the board of Rosneft, the Russian state-owned energy company. Dudley left the board of Rosneft in February 2022, amid Russia's invasion of Ukraine.

In April 2017, it was announced that BP was to cut Dudley's pay by $8 million after a shareholder revolt in 2016. 59% of the shareholders voted against Dudley's 2015 pay and benefits package worth $19.6 million.

Dudley retired in 2020, and was succeeded by Bernard Looney. The company’s chairman, Helge Lund, said it was “logical time for a change,” with BP in the midst of a global “energy transition.”

In July 2021, Dudley joined Axio Global a cyber risk management software company, as chairman. Dudley was also part of a consortium of investors in Axio's Series B $23M financing round, led by Temasek's ISTARI.

In August 2022, Dudley joined the board of 8 Rivers Capital.

== Personal life ==
Dudley is married to Mary Dudley, and they have two children. He is a Conservative Party donor.

Business positions
Preceded by Tony Hayward	Group Chief Executive of BP; 2010–2020	Succeeded by Bernard Looney
