= Bernard Looney =

Irish businessman and former CEO of BP

Bernard Looney FREng
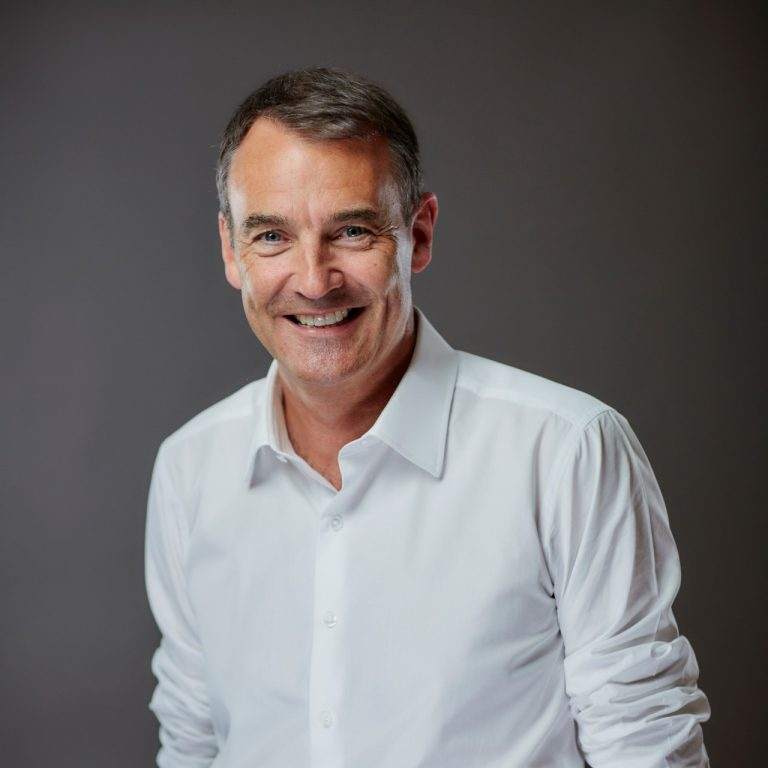
- Born: 1970 (age 54–55); County Kerry, Ireland
- Education: University College Dublin; Stanford Graduate School of Business
- Occupation: Businessman
- Title: CEO, BP
- Term: February 2020–September 2023
- Predecessor: Bob Dudley
- Successor: Murray Auchincloss
- Spouse: Jacqueline Hurst (m. 2017; div. 2019)

Bernard Looney FREng (born 1970) is an Irish businessman and former chief executive officer of BP.

During Looney's tenure as CEO of BP, he promised to end BP's relationship with Rosneft, the Russian state-owned energy giant, amid Russia's 2022 invasion of Ukraine. Looney was a member of Rosneft's board until February 2022.

== Early life ==
Looney was born in County Kerry, and was raised on a small dairy farm in Ashgrove, near Kenmare. He was the first in his family to attend a university. Looney earned a degree in electrical engineering from University College Dublin and a master's in management from Stanford Graduate School of Business. Looney is a fellow of the Royal Academy of Engineering, and a fellow of the Energy Institute.

== Career ==
Looney, who had spent his entire career at BP, worked in core production and drilling roles in the North Sea, Vietnam and Mexico, working in other executive roles before taking over the upstream division in 2016.

Looney sold BP shares worth £7.8 million in February and April 2019. In October 2019, it was announced that he would succeed Bob Dudley as group chief executive in February 2020.

Looney was one of five BP employees who attended COP27 as delegates of Mauritania, where BP has made significant investments. The company said Looney and the others attended for a signing ceremony; however, Looney's attendance was criticised by activists who were unhappy at the influence of executives from fossil fuel companies at the conference.

In March 2023, it was announced that Looney had received a 2022 pay package of £10 million, more than double what he received the previous year. The package included a £1.4 million salary, a £2.4 million bonus, and a £6 million share award, as well as benefits. It was criticized by campaign groups which questioned the appropriateness of such an increase while energy bills are a struggle for some families to pay.

In September 2023, Looney resigned abruptly from his position for failing to fully disclose details of his past personal relationships with colleagues.

Looney was appointed chairman of American data centre startup Prometheus Hyperscale in November 2024.

=== Response to the 2022 Russian invasion of Ukraine ===
Looney, by virtue of BP's 20% stake in Moscow-based oil-producer Rosneft, formerly worked alongside Igor Sechin, who is the chief executive officer, president and chairman of Rosneft's management board.

On 25 February 2022, Looney engaged in talks with the British Secretary of State for Business, Kwasi Kwarteng. The Government of the United Kingdom reportedly asked Looney to relinquish BP's 20% stake in the Russian state-owned oil firm Rosneft, which has strong ties to Russian oligarchs and the Kremlin, in the wake of the Russian invasion of Ukraine.

== Personal life ==
Looney lives in Mayfair, central London, England. He married British life coach Jacqueline Hurst in October 2017. They separated the next year and finalised their divorce in 2019.

Business positions
| Preceded by Bob Dudley | Group Chief Executive of BP; 2020–2023 | Succeeded by Murray Auchincloss |
