= Coon 2: Hindsight =

- South Park episode
- Episode no.: Season 14; Episode 11
- Directed by: Trey Parker
- Written by: Trey Parker
- Production code: 1411
- Original air date: October 27, 2010

Episode chronology
← Previous "Insheeption"	Next → "Mysterion Rises"
- South Park season 14

"Coon 2: Hindsight" (originally titled "The Coon 2: Rise of Captain Hindsight") is the eleventh episode of the fourteenth season of animated television series South Park, and the 206th episode of the series overall. It is a sequel to the season 13 episode "The Coon", and is the first part of a three-part story.

In the episode, the Coon (Cartman) now leads an entire team of crime-fighters (alter-egos of other regular characters, although the identities of a number of them are left unresolved until subsequent episodes). They are ready to take their place among the world's most admired and beloved superheroes. But much to the Coon's dismay, someone else keeps beating them to the punch. The nation looks to another hero to get them through the BP disaster and dissent develops within the ranks of Coon and Friends.

The episode premiered on October 27, 2010, on Comedy Central and was written and directed by series co-creator Trey Parker. The episode was rated TV-MA-LV in the United States.

== Plot ==
Cartman's alter-ego, The Coon, now leads an entire team of crime-fighters, which includes fellow heroes Mysterion, Toolshed, Iron Maiden, Tupperware, Mosquito, Mint Berry Crunch, and The Human Kite, although the Coon is intent on taking all the glory. A fire breaks out in a local apartment building, and the Coon gets his mother to drive them over. Before they can take any action, though, Captain Hindsight, a renowned hero, arrives at the burning hotel, telling them of safety measures that SHOULD have been taken, and departs to a standing ovation. People are relieved, happy that Captain Hindsight has "solved" the problem and promptly abandon the still burning building, leaving fourteen people in the apartment to burn to death. In the aftermath, the Coon concludes that they will need to get Captain Hindsight to join them in order to regain their former glory. He is unsuccessful in recruiting Captain Hindsight and instead plans to blackmail him into joining by photoshopping Hindsight's face onto images of a homeless person having sex with Courtney Love (actually Butters Stotch, alias Professor Chaos, in disguise).

Meanwhile, a BP drilling vessel drills a new hole in the Gulf, only to accidentally cause an oil leak in a protected zone, prompting one of the crewmen to exclaim "Oh, don't tell me we did it AGAIN!" a reference to the Deepwater Horizon oil spill. As they start trying to fix their mishap, the CEO of the company, Tony Hayward, immediately issues a "we're sorry" campaign to try to avoid a severe public backlash, changing the name from "Beyond Petroleum" to "Dependable Petroleum" (DP) and announcing that "we no longer fuck the Earth, we DP it". On a Coon & Friends meeting, the Coon explicitly states that he has no care for the people suffering from the DP spill, prioritizing his plans to blackmail Hindsight. Disagreeing with the Coon's interests, the rest of the group vote, after which the Coon is reluctantly forced to go with Mosquito's idea to set up a fundraising event in order to help the people affected by the DP crisis. The Coon viciously assaults Mosquito and Mint Berry Crunch (a reference to the film A Clockwork Orange) to regain control.

DP's second drilling accidentally opens up a gateway to another dimension, causing the entire gulf to be attacked by giant alien creatures. Hayward, after another "we're sorry" campaign, determines that they will need to drill on the Moon in order to change the gravitational pull on the Earth and quell the swells on the ocean, which will allow them to place a cap on the gateway. Unfortunately, in the act of doing this, they inadvertently release Cthulhu, bringing 3000 years of darkness to earth, forcing Hayward to send out a third "we're sorry" campaign. By that time, the Coon is unanimously kicked out of Coon and Friends due to his behavior's conflicting with what the Friends want to accomplish, and his mother grounds him for swearing and beating up his friends. With Cartman no longer in control, and Captain Hindsight too distraught to save the day, the Friends go to fight Cthulhu themselves. Believing that his friends have "turned evil", Cartman decides to take matters in his own hands.

== Secret identities ==
=== Coon and Friends ===
- The Coon (Eric Cartman) – In his first appearance he gave inner monologues in the style of numerous dark-toned comic-book movies and often disappeared mid-conversation. When in costume and character as "The Coon", he speaks in a dark, gritty rasp. Although he is kicked out in the episode "Coon 2: Hindsight" for being "a dick", the group keeps its original name to spite him.
- Mysterion (Kenny McCormick) – Unlike most members of Coon and Friends, he actually has a superpower: he cannot remain dead after being killed. Like Batman, Travis Bickle from the 1976 film Taxi Driver, and Shadow The Hedgehog, he speaks in a dark, gritty rasp when in costume and character. However, he finds dying to be painful and his friends' inability to remember his deaths very frustrating. In his anger, he shoots himself in the head to try to make them remember. It proves unsuccessful.
- Toolshed (Stan Marsh) – He has taken his dad's tools to outfit himself.
- Tupperware (Tolkien Black) – His costume is made of Tupperware.
- Iron Maiden (Timmy Burch) – His wheelchair is covered with a metal armor with blades, much like the torture device, except inside-out.
- Mint Berry Crunch (Bradley Biggle) – A parody of Two-Face in having half of a costume, which is criticized by The Coon. He is the most ridiculed, but eventually discovers that he has some powerful abilities.
- Mosquito (Clyde Donovan) – Wears a mosquito costume with wings and a vuvuzela over his nose to resemble a mosquito's proboscis.
- The Human Kite (Kyle Broflovski) – Wears a kite as a costume, similar to the character Kite Man. He is frequently harassed by Eric Cartman as "The Human Kike".

=== Enemies ===
- Professor Chaos (Butters Stotch) – Claims to have been locked up in Cartman's basement for six days, and he is already breaking character.

=== Other ===
- Captain Hindsight (Jack Brolin) – A former news reporter that has gained the power of extraordinary hindsight through a freak accident involving a retroactive spider (a play on Peter Parker, who became Spider-Man through an accident with a radioactive Spider, and the Hulk (Bruce Banner), who through an accident in a machine similar to the one shown develops superpowers).

== Cultural references ==
Stanley Kubrick's 1971 film A Clockwork Orange is alluded to when the Coon attacks Mosquito and Mint Berry Crunch. The same music is also used: an excerpt from the overture of The Thieving Magpie by Gioachino Rossini.

Captain Hindsight advises the NFL about Brett Favre, a professional American football player accused of sending pictures of his penis via mobile telephone.

The creatures emerging from the dimensional tear are similar to those in the works of author H. P. Lovecraft and the Stephen King novella The Mist, as well as its film adaptation. Cthulhu is a monster from the works of horror/science fiction author H. P. Lovecraft.

The character of Mosquito covers his nose with a Vuvuzela. Vuvuzelas were used in protest of the Deepwater Horizon oil spill.

The episode also features self-references to the season nine episode "Free Willzyx" and season fourteen episode "201" by showing Willzyx the killer whale and Tom Cruise dead on the surface of the Moon.

== Reception ==
In its original American broadcast on October 27, 2010, the episode was watched by 2.755 million viewers, according to Nielsen Media Research, a slight drop in viewers since the previous episode. The episode received a 1.7 rating/3 share, meaning it was watched by 1.7 percent of the population and 3 percent of people watching television at the time of the episodes broadcast. As with the previous episode, "Coon 2: Hindsight" received a 1.6 rating/5 share among adult viewers between ages 18 and 49. Among male viewers between ages 18 and 34, the episode received a 3.6 rating/11 share.

Josh Modell of The A.V. Club described the episode as "pretty one-note" giving it a C rating.

== Home media ==
"Coon 2: Hindsight", along with the thirteen other episodes from South Park's fourteenth season, were released on a three-disc DVD set and two-disc Blu-ray set in the United States on April 26, 2011.
