= Meg O'Neill =

American chief executive of a British Oil and Gas company

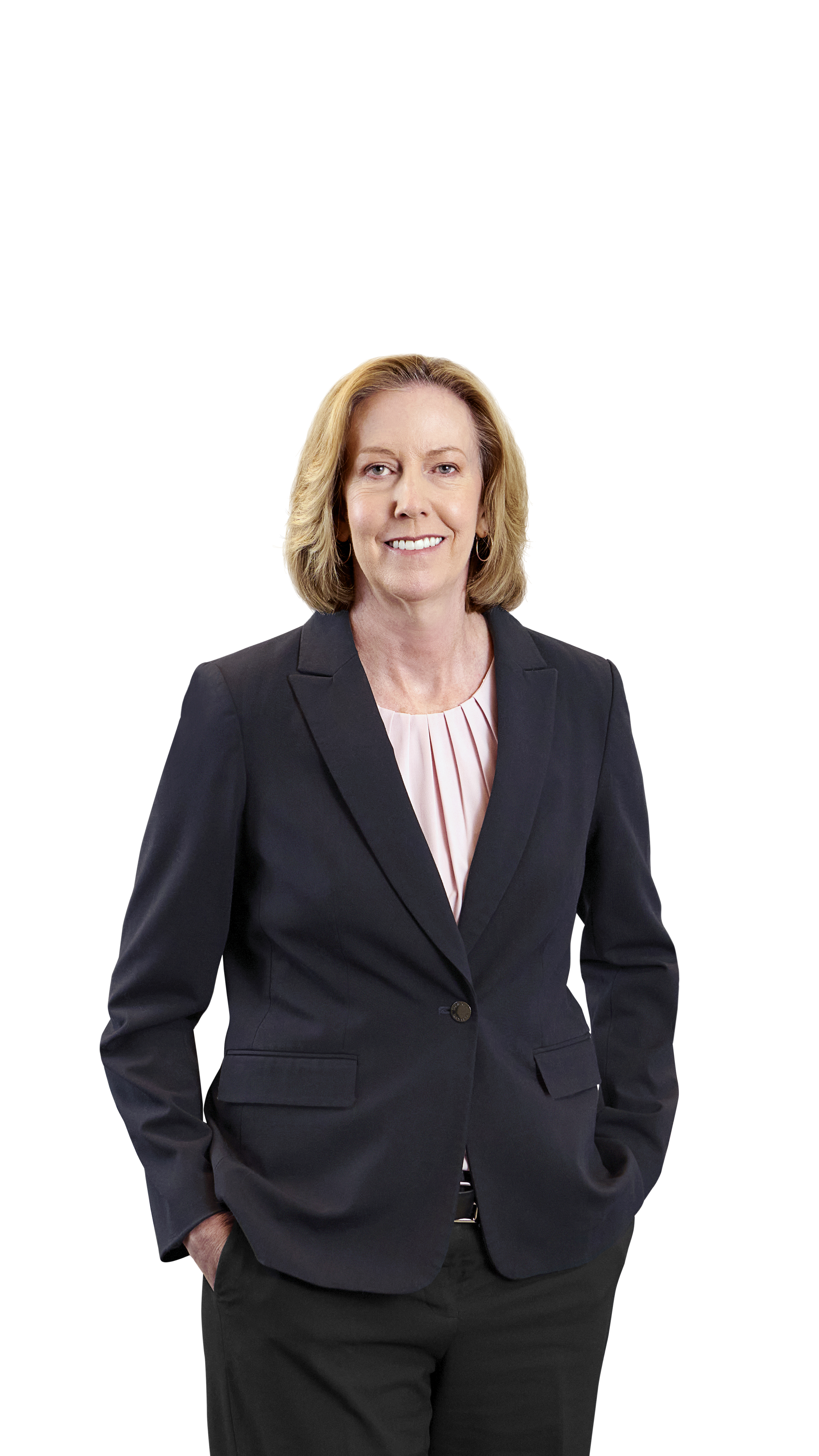
- Born: Marguerite Eileen O'Neill; September 1970 (age 56); Boulder, Colorado
- Education: Massachusetts Institute of Technology
- Occupation: CEO/Managing Director
- Known for: Business executive in the Oil & Gas Industry
- Term: 2021 - Present
- Predecessor: Peter Coleman
- Board member of: BP, Australian Energy Producers (AEP), Reconciliation Western Australia, West Australian Symphony Orchestra.
- Spouse: Vicky Hayes
- Children: 1

Meg O'Neill (Marguerite Eileen O'Neill; born 1970 or 1971) is an American business executive and the current chief executive officer (CEO) of BP from April 2026.

== Early life and education ==
Meg O'Neill was raised in Boulder, Colorado. Her father worked as an engineer, initially at Bell Labs and later in start-ups, which sparked her interest in math and science. When she left high school, O’Neill had tossed up between studying engineering or history. She attended the Massachusetts Institute of Technology, where she initially studied chemical engineering but later shifted her focus to ocean engineering, ultimately earning degrees in both fields. Her passion for the international aspects of the petroleum industry was influenced by an exchange year she spent in Finland.

== Early career and ExxonMobil ==
O'Neill began her career at ExxonMobil, working in a variety of technical, operational, and leadership roles across multiple countries.

She began her career with ExxonMobil in Houston, Texas, where she worked on offshore oil field modelling for four years. Following this, she transitioned to reservoir engineering in New Orleans.

In 2003, O'Neill was given an engineering leadership role in Jakarta, Indonesia, where she managed the company’s LNG gas fields in Aceh, shortly after the region was devastated by the 2004 Indian Ocean earthquake and tsunami.

After three years in Aceh, O'Neill returned to ExxonMobil’s headquarters in Houston for a global role overseeing reservoir engineers, and later led offshore operations in Newfoundland, Canada. She then served as the country manager in Norway.

After Norway, she returned to Houston to oversee operations in the Asia Pacific region, gaining her first exposure to Western Australia through Exxon’s stake in the Gorgon LNG plant on Barrow Island.

In 2016, O'Neill was appointed as an executive advisor to Rex Tillerson, who was the CEO of ExxonMobil at the time. Following Tillerson's nomination by President Donald Trump to serve as the United States Secretary of State, Darren Woods assumed the role of CEO and Chairman in 2017. O'Neill continued in her advisory capacity under Woods.

Prior to leaving ExxonMobil in March 2018, Meg held the position of Vice President, Africa for ExxonMobil Development Company based in Houston, where she was responsible for ExxonMobil’s major projects across Africa, including Angola, Nigeria, Tanzania and Mozambique.

== Woodside Energy ==
=== Joining Woodside and early challenges ===
O'Neill joined Woodside Petroleum in May 2018 as Chief Operating Officer after her tenure at ExxonMobil. She was recruited by Peter Coleman, a former ExxonMobil colleague and then CEO of Woodside Petroleum.

Shortly after her appointment, O'Neill became deeply involved in complex negotiations between Woodside, BHP, and other major North West Shelf joint venture partners to establish terms for processing gas from undeveloped fields off Western Australia. These negotiations were complicated by differing ownership stakes and priorities among partners, which led to public tensions.

She was appointed Executive Vice President Development in 2019. In this role, she was responsible for delivering Woodside's major growth projects in Australia and Senegal. In 2020, she also assumed responsibility for Marketing.

=== Appointment to CEO ===
On the 17th August 2021, O'Neill was appointed Chief Executive Officer and Managing Director of Woodside Energy. O'Neill is one of only three women leading an ASX20 company and the first woman to lead a Big Oil supermajor.

One of her first significant challenges was the negotiation of a merger with BHP's petroleum business, which would double Woodside's size. In 2022, the $63 billion merger was successfully completed. It placed Woodside among the top ten independent oil and gas companies globally and making Woodside the largest energy company listed on the Australian Securities Exchange.

Under her leadership, the company underwent a rebranding, changing its name from Woodside Petroleum to Woodside Energy. This change was positioned as part of a commitment to the energy transition, alongside ambitious sustainability targets, including a pledge to invest $5 billion in new energy products and lower-carbon services by 2030 and a non-binding commitment to achieve carbon neutrality by 2050.

O'Neill's tenure has faced scrutiny from environmental activists and shareholder groups, with criticisms regarding the pace and sincerity of Woodside's energy transition efforts. While she advocates for the role of gas in the energy mix, her initiatives have raised concerns about potential greenwashing, with some stakeholders questioning the genuine commitment to sustainability amid ongoing fossil fuel operations.

== BP ==
She became chief executive officer (CEO) of BP in April 2026.

== Leadership in industry associations ==
The Australian Energy Producers (AEP) serves as the lobbying organisation for Australia's oil and gas industry.

In November 2022, AEP elected O’Neill as Chair during its Annual General Meeting (AGM) in Perth. She has been a member of the AEP Board since 2019.

== Personal life ==
O'Neill is a lesbian. She moved to Perth, Australia in 2018 to become Woodside's CEO where she now lives with her wife, Vicky Hayes, and teenage daughter.

In 2023, climate activists from the group Disrupt Burrup Hub were arrested outside O'Neill's house in City Beach, Perth, where they planned to vandalise her home in protest of Woodside's gas expansion plans.

An avid sports participant in her youth, O'Neill now enjoys netball and golf and is involved in Perth’s arts scene, including serving on the board of the West Australian Symphony Orchestra.

She is a current member of Chief Executive Women and University of Western Australia Business School.
