= Mysterion Rises =

- South Park episode
- Episode no.: Season 14; Episode 12
- Directed by: Trey Parker
- Written by: Trey Parker
- Production code: 1412
- Original air date: November 3, 2010

Episode chronology
← Previous "Coon 2: Hindsight"	Next → "Coon vs. Coon and Friends"
- South Park season 14

"Mysterion Rises" is the twelfth episode of the fourteenth season of animated television series South Park, and the 207th episode of the series overall. It aired on Comedy Central on November 3, 2010, and is the second of a three-part arc that began with the episode "Coon 2: Hindsight".

The episode was written and directed by series co-creator Trey Parker, and was rated TV-MA-LV in the United States. In its original American broadcast on November 3, 2010, "Mysterion Rises" was watched by 3.263 million viewers. According to Nielsen ratings, "Mysterion Rises" was seen by 2.85 million overall households. This episode revealed the secret identity of Mysterion, which was deliberately left unresolved in "The Coon" and "Coon 2: Hindsight."

== Plot ==
The episode starts off with comic-like recap of the previous episode ("Coon 2: Hindsight") before turning into a Batman-like title screen. The group is now led by Mysterion, although still called "Coon and Friends" (because it "pisses Cartman off beyond belief", which Mysterion finds extremely funny), and hold a bake sale to aid those in the Gulf affected by Cthulhu's arrival at the end of the previous episode, meeting a strange man who state their efforts to stop Cthulhu are futile. Coon and Friends then return to find that Captain Hindsight has ransacked their base looking for incriminating photos of him with Courtney Love. The boys reveal the pictures are fake and solely constructed by Eric Cartman as blackmail, but Hindsight is too conflicted to believe them. Mysterion tells Hindsight that if he does not believe them, he has no choice but to pull the trigger. All the other heroes are shocked by this show of what can only be fearlessness or foolishness as Mysterion tells them to leave. While doing so, Human Kite (Kyle Broflovski), among others, all too shocked to keep up the act, off-handedly calls Mysterion by his real name, Kenny McCormick, to calm down. Hindsight soon reveals that he believes having perfect 20/20 hindsight to be nothing more than a curse, but Kenny easily makes it look like a joke compared to his own curse, namely, his familiar inability to die. It is revealed that every time Kenny dies, he simply wakes up in his bed the next day restored to full health. Furthermore, nobody seems to be able to remember his death, even if they witnessed it first hand.

While this occurs, Cartman is at the airport to make his way to Cthulhu, who delayed Cartman's flight by defecating on the runway. After beating up a little girl (Cartman incorrectly tells the audience that she is a villain), Cartman arrives at Cthulhu's location and tries to get the attention of Cthulhu, so he can get revenge on his former team. However, Cthulhu is uninterested and leaves Cartman. Cartman then decides to be cute and adorable to manipulate Cthulhu. After introducing himself as "the little Coon" and rubbing Cthulhu's belly (much like Mei from My Neighbor Totoro), Cartman befriends Cthulhu. He then calls a press conference and declares them the new, and this time trademarked, "Coon and Friends". Along the way to South Park, Cartman and Cthulhu are shown destroying a synagogue and San Francisco. By then, after deliberating over his situation, Hindsight decides to remove his powers and resume being news reporter Jack Brolin, but after seeing an innocent person with an injured arm crying for his help, Brolin realizes that "Hindsight" should not have removed his powers.

Back at South Park, Coon and Friends learn about the cult of Cthulhu, and they discover that Kenny's parents were a part of it. Kenny, who is understandably shocked, goes to his house to question them as Mysterion. During this, Mosquito reluctantly reveals himself to be Clyde, when his mother ordered him to take out the trash, and taking off a vuvuzela on his nose as if it was a mosquito's proboscis. Kenny's parents were only indirectly involved with the Cult of Cthulhu (they only went for the free beer), and he forces them to tell him whereabouts of the South Park chapter. Together with the other heroes, they go to the Cult meeting, and notice familiar faces (Mr. Adler, the Goth Kids, and the Star Trek fans). Kenny, however, becomes alarmed over a line they say:

That is not dead which can eternal lie.
And with strange aeons even death may die.

He abandons his friends and confronts the Goth kids in an alley about what it means. The leader of the cult then shows up and asks for the Goth kids' assistance in dispensing of Mysterion. Coon and Friends show up too late, as the leader takes Kindergoth's switchblade and stabs Kenny in the chest. At this point, Human Kite turns out to be Kyle when he exclaims "You bastards!" in reaction to Kenny's death. Inevitably, Kenny wakes up in his bed, unharmed. The rest of the Friends show up at his bedroom door asking him why he ran away from the cult and that they have to defeat Cthulhu, completely unaware of the fact that he just died. Kenny sighs in disappointment, ending the episode.

== Cultural references ==
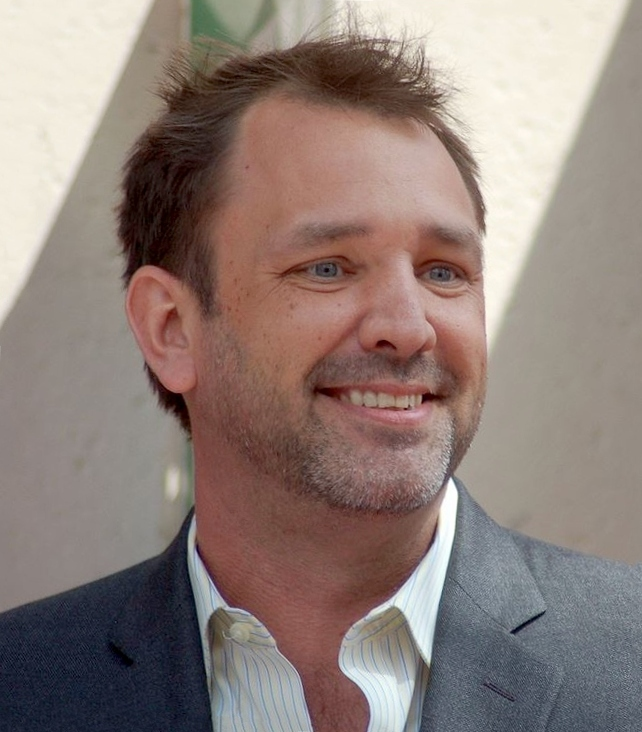
Trey Parker wrote and directed this episode

"Mysterion Rises" was written and directed by series co-creator Trey Parker. It first aired on November 3, 2010 in the United States on Comedy Central. Like all South Park episodes, "Mysterion Rises" was first conceived by Parker and fellow co-founder Matt Stone within a week of the episode's broadcast date.

The episode's title is a play on the title for The Dark Knight Rises, the final film in Christopher Nolan's Batman film trilogy, which was announced only days before the episode aired. Cartman interacting with Cthulhu while on his belly and the animation sequence while flying with Cthulhu are references to the Warner Bros. Looney Tunes characters Marc Antony and Pussyfoot and the film My Neighbor Totoro. The song playing during the flying sequence is also a parody of the Totoro theme song. In this episode there is a parody clip of LeBron James' "Rise" commercial for Nike (giving the episode title a double parody). The line "I am not a role model" was originally used by Charles Barkley, hence the wink at the end. The goth kids believe the rise of Cthulhu will be like a never-ending Nine Inch Nails concert, and hope Cthulhu will bring an end to The Disney Channel.

== Reception ==
Sean O'Neal of The A.V. Club gave the episode a C+ rating.

Ramsey Isler of IGN gives the episode an "impressive" 8 out of 10. He complains that the episode had very few laugh-out-loud moments but praised the show for experimenting with new visual styles and presenting a more ambitious vision than the past few episodes.

== Home media ==
"Mysterion Rises", along with the thirteen other episodes from South Park's fourteenth season, were released on a three-disc DVD set and two-disc Blu-ray set in the United States on April 26, 2011.
