= Longhope Lifeboat Station =

RNLI lifeboat station in Orkney, Scotland

- Flag of the RNLI

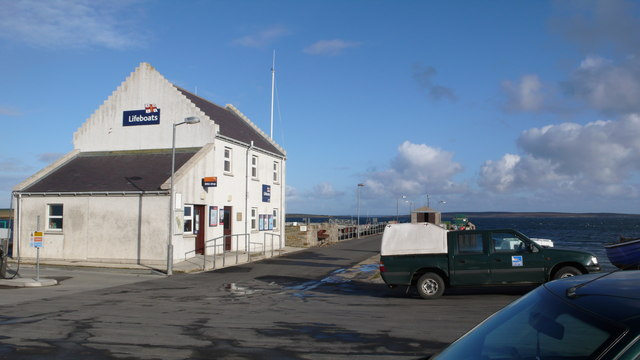
- Longhope Lifeboat Station

- Location within Orkney Islands

General information
- Type: Lifeboat station
- Location: Longhope Pier, Longhope, Orkney, South Walls, Orkney, KW16 3PG, Scotland, United Kingdom
- Coordinates: 58.800556°N 3.206861°W
- Opened: 1874; 152 years ago
- Owner: Royal National Lifeboat Institution

Website
- Longhope RNLI Lifeboat Station

Longhope Lifeboat Station sits on Longhope Pier at Longhope, a settlement on the north coast of the island of South Walls, one of the islands of the Orkney archipelago, off the north coast of mainland Scotland.

A lifeboat station was established at Longhope by the Royal National Lifeboat Institution (RNLI) in 1874.

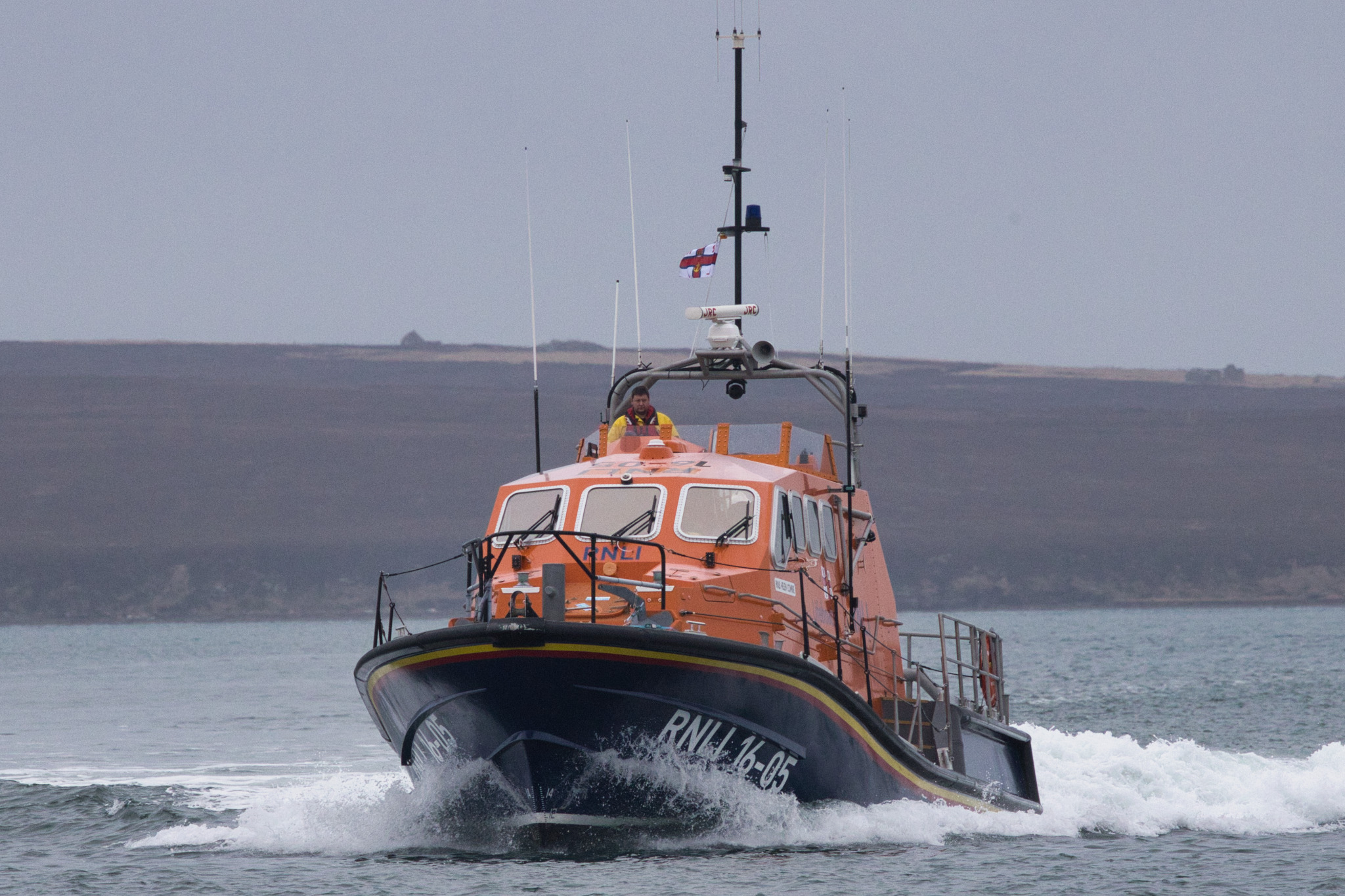
Tamar-class All-weather lifeboat 16–05 Helen Comrie (ON 1284)

The station currently operates a Tamar-class All-weather lifeboat, 16–05 Helen Comrie (ON 1284), on station since 2006.

== History ==
Following requests from local residents, and a visit by Capt. John Ward, Inspector of Lifeboats, at a meeting of the RNLI committee of management on Thursday 5 March 1874, it was decided to appropriate the gift of £800 to the Institution from Mr Dickinson Eddleston of Sowerby Bridge, and establish a lifeboat station at Longhope, in the Orkney Islands.

...where a lamentable shipwreck, with loss of life, took place some little time since, and from which place it was thought the boat might be enabled to render service to the crews of vessels in distress in that part of the Pentland Firth.

— The Life-boat, vol.IX, issue 97, page 390, 2 August 1875

1874 Longhope lifeboat house, with the 1906 boathouse in the background

A lifeboat house costing £228 was constructed about 1.7 miles (2.7 km) west of Longhope on the Isle of Hoy, at the western end of The Ayre causeway, which joins South Walls to Hoy. (coord: 58°46′59.8″N 3°14′06.4″W) The site was granted by landowner J. Moodie Heddle, who also pledged a subscription of £30 per annum to the Institution.

The new 37 ft (11 m) self-righting 'Pulling and Sailing' (P&S) lifeboat, one with both sails and 12 oars, was dispatched to the station, and was named Dickinson Edleston after the donor. The first launch of the new boat took place on 25 September 1874, under the guidance of Capt. David Robertson, RN, assistant Inspector of Life-boats.

The Dickinson Edleston was launched at 16:30 on 3 March 1891, into gale force conditions, to the aid of the SS Victoria, on passage from Hamburg to New York, but was now sinking in the Pentland Firth. Her 22 crew, including 11 Germans, were rescued. They were landed at Widewall Bay on South Ronaldsay. Such were the conditions, that the lifeboat was forced to remain there until the weather improved, finally arriving home at 13:30 on 5 March. For leading the rescue, Coxswain Benjamin Stout was awarded the RNLI Silver Medal, along with a gold watch from Wilhelm II, Emperor of Germany. The Emperor also rewarded £24 to the lifeboat crew.

1906 Longhope Lifeboat Station

In 1906, a new lifeboat house and slipway was constructed at Brims, on Hoy, about 0.5 mi (0.80 km) to the south of the original boathouse. The new boathouse, which cost £2,700, was constructed to house a new 43-foot Watson-class (P&S) lifeboat. Anne Miles (ON 550) would serve Longhope for the next 20 years, launching on service seven times, and saving eight lives. When she was replaced in 1926, Longhope would receive their first motor-powered lifeboat.

=== Motor-power ===
Longhope's new motor-lifeboat was a 45-foot 6in Watson-class lifeboat, built by S. E. Saunders of Cowes, with a single 80-hp 'Weyburn DE6' petrol engine, and costing £8,330. The boat set out from the boatyard in Cowes at 18:30 on 1 September 1926, arriving at Montrose at 08:30 five days later, having called at Ramsgate, Great Yarmouth and Gorleston, Scarborough and Sunderland. After two days rest at Montrose, the journey continued via Wick, with the lifeboat arriving at Longhope on 9 September 1926. The lifeboat was funded from the legacies of Mr W. G. King, Mr J. Turnbull, Mr G. J. Jesset and Mrs S. H. Sandford, and to represent the four benefactors, at a ceremony on 6 June 1928, the lifeboat was formally named K. T. J. S. (ON 698), by HRH Prince George.

On 5 January 1930, the steam trawler Braconmoor of Aberdeen ran ashore at Tor Ness Point, in a south-easterly gale. K. T. J. S. was launched at 02:00, and arrived with the wreck after one hour, to find it surrounded by dangerous rocks and in heavy surf. In a service lasting five hours, with considerable skill, the lifeboat was brought close, and a line thrown to the vessel. All nine crew were rescued by Breeches buoy, although the Master didn't survive the rescue. Coxswain John Swanson was awarded the RNLI Silver Medal. Just two years later, again off Tor Point, eight men were rescued from the trawler Dorbie of Hull. Swanson was awarded a Second-service clasp to his silver medal.

K. T. J. S. was transferred to Aith in 1933. During her short time at Longhope, she had been launched 24 times, and saved 25 lives. Her replacement was a twin-engined version of the 45-foot 6in Watson-class lifeboat, offering greater power and manoeuvrability. The new lifeboat was the third funded from the legacy of William McCunn of Largs, and at a ceremony on 15 September 1933, was named Thomas McCunn (ON 759).

After serving Longhope for nearly 30 years, Thomas McCunn (ON 759) was withdrawn to the Relief fleet in April 1962, and replaced with a slightly larger 47-foot Watson-class lifeboat, costing £35,500. T. G. B. (ON 962) was equipped with twin 60-hp Gardner 5LW diesel engines, delivering a top speed of 9 knots (17 km/h; 10 mph). During a remarkable spell of service during her seven years at Longhope, she would launch 34 times, and save 24 lives.

Even before the naming ceremony, she had landed 10 men from their ship's boat, after their vessel Nella Dan of Denmark sank on 4 August 1962. Coxswain Daniel Kirkpatrick would receive his second RNLI Silver Medal for the rescue of nine men from the Aberdeen trawler Ben Barvas on 3–4 January 1964. Kirkpatrick would earn a third silver medal for the rescue of 15 men from the trawler Rosa Puma on 1 April 1968, but he would be lost the following year, before it had been awarded..

=== Longhope lifeboat disaster ===
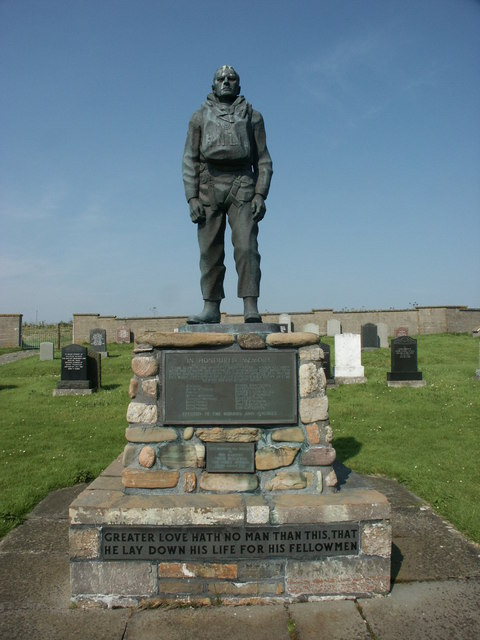
Longhope Lifeboat Memorial

At 20:00 on 17 March 1969, during a period of particularly bad weather, and force 9 gales, the Longhope lifeboat T.G.B. (ON 962) was launched into snow flurries and poor visibility, to the aid of the Liberian registered steamship Irene, which was adrift in the Pentland Firth. Also launched was the 70 ft (21 m) Kirkwall lifeboat, 70-002 Grace Paterson Ritchie (ON 988). The last radio signal from T.G.B. was received at 21:28, and she was seen from the Pentland Skerries lighthouse at 21:35. A radio message at 22:10, to inform that conditions alongside the Irene were impossible, was never acknowledged.

By 22:30, concerns about the Longhope lifeboat were growing. The Kirkwall lifeboat was redirected to her last known position, but nothing was found. Lifeboats from Stronsay, Stromness and Thurso were also launched. The Irene had been driven ashore on South Ronaldsay, and by 01:30, all the crew had been rescued by the Coastguard using a Breeches buoy.

Tuesday 18 March 1969 was London Lifeboat Day. Coins were dropped into collection boxes all over the city, as the nation waited for news. At 13:40, the worst outcome was reported. The Thurso lifeboat had found the Longhope lifeboat, floating upturned, four miles south-west of Tor Ness. It was towed back to Scrabster, where the bodies of seven crew members were discovered still aboard. An eighth crew member, James Swanson, was never found. It was later revealed that Daniel Kirkpatrick's watch had stopped at 21:47.

1,200 people attended a memorial service at St. Magnus Cathedral, Kirkwall on Sunday, 23rd March. At a ceremony held on 9 August 1970, a memorial to the crew of T. G. B. was unveiled at Osmundwall cemetery by HM Queen Elizabeth the Queen Mother.

=== 1969 onwards ===
The loss of the crew of T. G. B. was a pivotal moment for the RNLI. It was decided that all subsequent new lifeboats would be constructed to be self-righting. The non-self-righting T. G. B. was refurbished, and was re-deployed. After serving at Arranmore for a further nine years, and a period in the relief fleet, T. G. B. was placed on display at the Scottish Maritime Museum in Irvine. Longhope lifeboat station would again be operational on 22 May 1970, with a relief lifeboat, the 52-foot Barnett-class (Mk.I) Hilton Briggs (ON 889), and a new crew. Jack Leslie, second coxswain at Stromness, was appointed as the new coxswain.

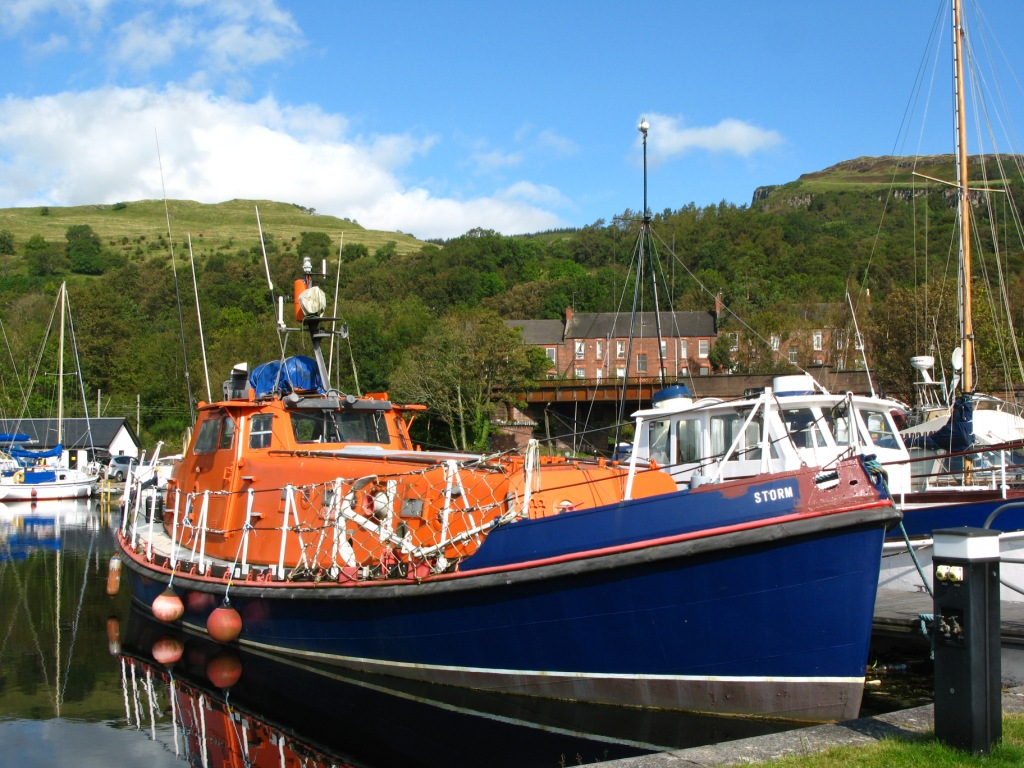
Solent-class lifeboat 48-007 David and Elizabeth King and E. B. (ON 1010)

Longhope would receive their permanent replacement later in 1970. This was the new self-righting Solent-class lifeboat 48-007 David and Elizabeth King and E. B. (ON 1010), built by Groves and Guttridge, with twin 110-hp Gardner 6LX engines, and costing £58,936. Over the next 18 years at Longhope, she would launch 77 times, and save 32 lives. Coxswain Jack Leslie would receive the RNLI Bronze Medal, for the rescue of 11 people on 9–10 February 1973, from the trawler Ross Tern which had run ashore on Swona.

In 1988, a new Tyne-class lifeboat, 47-025 Lord Saltoun (ON 1138), was placed at Longhope. Modification work was carried out on the boathouse to accommodate the new boat, including the installation of a new fuel storage tank, and replacement to the bottom sections of the slipway keelway channel. Further works were carried out in 1990, with a crew room and toilet facilities constructed in the roof space.

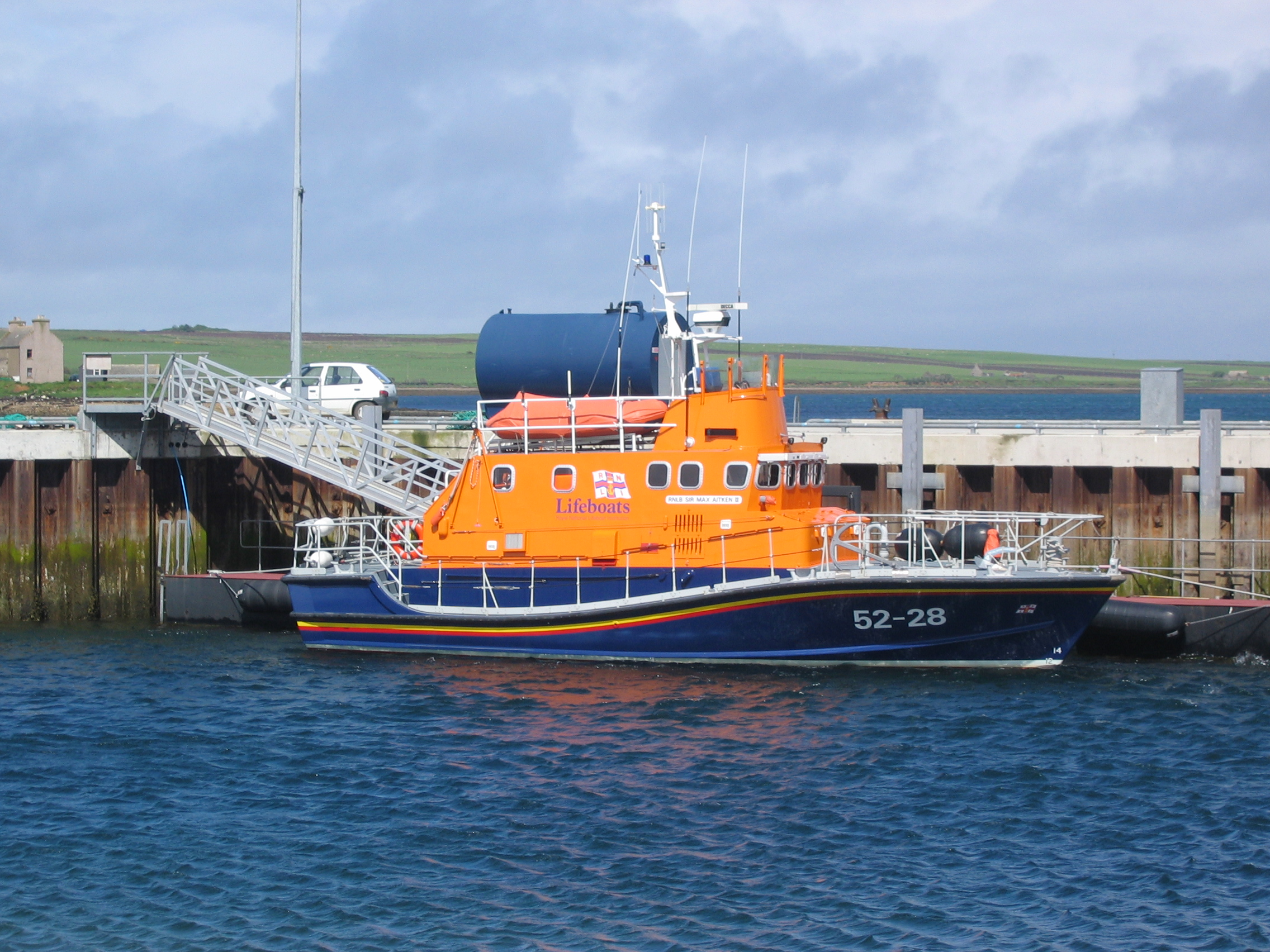
Longhope lifeboat Sir Max Aitken II (1999–2004)

In the 1990s, it was decided to schedule the placement of a new Severn-class All-weather lifeboat at Longhope. In the interim period, a 15-year-old Arun-class lifeboat, 52–28 Sir Max Aitken II (ON 1098) arrived on station on 12 August 1999, which due to its size, had to be moored at Longhope harbour. For the first time in 125 years, the Longhope lifeboat would be permanently stationed in Longhope.

However, in 2001, plans were changed again, and it was decided that instead of a new Severn-class lifeboat, the station would receive one of the new 'Fast Slipway Lifeboats' (FSB2), subsequently designated as Tamar-class. It is not known if there were plans to construct a new boathouse with slipway, but this never materialised. The old station on Hoy became the Longhope Lifeboat Museum, opening in May 2002. The Watson-class lifeboat Thomas McCunn (ON 759) is the primary exhibit. A new boathouse was constructed at Longhope Harbour, and a breakwater and pontoon berth were completed in April 2003, at a cost of £450,000.

The Longhope lifeboat was launched on 27 August 2004 into dreadful conditions, with recorded wind speeds up to 85 knots (157 km/h; 98 mph). Coxswain Kevin Kirkpatrick was accorded 'The Thanks of the Institution inscribed on Vellum', for saving the yacht Dasher and its three crew. Mechanic John Budge received 'A Framed Letter of Thanks signed by the Chairman of the Institution'.

The new Tamar-class All-weather lifeboat 16-05 Helen Comrie (ON 1284) was placed on service on 26 October 2006. The first major service for a Tamar-class lifeboat came just 16 days later, on 11 November 2006, when the lifeboat was called to assist the Oil tanker FR8 Venture. Whilst trying to set anchor, in Force 12 conditions, three men on the bow were hit by a large wave, and washed down the deck. Two were killed, and the third was seriously injured. Local GP Dr Christine Bradshaw was taken out to the vessel, and treated the casualty, returning with the man to hospital via helicopter. Collective Framed Letters of Thanks, signed by the Chairman of the Institution, were awarded to Coxswain Kevin Kirkpatrick and his crew, and to Captain Noble and the crew of the helicopter. A rare award for non lifeboat crew, Dr Bradshaw received the RNLI Bronze Medal for gallantry, and later, a special commendation from the The Shipwrecked Fishermen and Mariners' Royal Benevolent Society.

After serving as Longhope lifeboat coxswain for two decades, Kevin Kirkpatrick, who lost his father, uncle and grandfather in the Longhope Lifeboat Disaster, stood down from the role in 2022.

Longhope lifeboat station celebrated its 150th anniversary in 2024.

== Station honours ==
The following are awards made at Longhope:

- RNLI Silver Medal
  Benjamin Stout, Coxswain – 1891
  Benjamin Stout, Coxswain – 1900 (Second-service clasp)
  William Cheyne, fisherman – 1906
  Daniel Fiddler, fisherman – 1906
  William Groat, fisherman – 1906
  Edward Jamieson, fisherman – 1906
  Bremner Taylor, fisherman – 1906
  William Taylor, fisherman – 1906
  John Swanson, Coxswain – 1930
  John Swanson, Coxswain – 1932 (Second-service clasp)
  Daniel Kirkpatrick, Coxswain – 1959
  Daniel Kirkpatrick, Coxswain – 1964 (Second-service clasp)
  Daniel Kirkpatrick, Coxswain – 1968 (Third-service clasp)
- James Michael Bower Endowment Fund, awarded by the Peninsular and Oriental Steam Navigation Company, to those who receive either the Gold or Silver Medal of the RNLI for gallantry.
  Daniel Kirkpatrick, Coxswain – 1960
  Daniel Kirkpatrick, Coxswain – 1964
  Daniel Kirkpatrick, Coxswain – 1968
- RNLI Bronze Medal
  William Dass, Coxswain – 1936
  Alfred Johnston, Coxswain – 1951
  Jack Leslie, Coxswain – 1973
  Dr Christine Bradshaw, GP – 2007
- 'The Thanks of the Institution inscribed on Vellum'
  Longhope Lifeboat Crew – 1930
  Longhope Lifeboat Crew – 1932
  William Sutherland, Honorary Secretary – 1946
  James Johnston, Bowman – 1959
  Robert Johnston, Motor Mechanic – 1959
  Robert Rattray Johnston, Asst. Mechanic – 1959
  Daniel Kirkpatrick, Coxswain – 1960
  James Johnston, Second Coxswain – 1964
  Ray Kirkpatrick, Bowman – 1964
  Robert Johnston, Motor Mechanic – 1964
  Robert Rattray Johnston, Asst. Mechanic – 1964
  James Swanson, crew member – 1964
  Robbie Johnston, crew member – 1964
  Jack Kirkpatrick, crew member – 1964
  James Johnston, Second Coxswain – 1968
  Daniel Raymond Kirkpatrick, Bowman – 1968
  Robert Rattray Johnston, Mechanic – 1968
  James Swanson, Asst. Mechanic – 1968
  Robbie Johnston, crew member – 1968
  Kevin Kirkpatrick, Coxswain – 2004
- Medal Service Certificates
  James Nicholson, crew member – 1959
  Daniel Raymond Kirkpatrick, crew member – 1959
  Robert Johnston, crew member – 1959
  Longhope Lifeboat Crew – 1973
- 'A Framed Letter of Thanks signed by the Chairman of the Institution'
  Coxswain Ian McFadyen and the Longhope Crew – 1999
  Mechanic John Budge – 2004
- 'A Collective Letter of Thanks signed by the Chairman of the Institution'
  Coxswain Kevin Kirkpatrick and his crew – 2007
  Captain Noble and the crew of the rescue helicopter – 2007
- Inscribed Binoculars, awarded by the Institution
  Robert Johnston, Mechanic – 1932
- Inscribed Barometer, awarded by the Institution
  William Sutherland, Honorary Secretary – 1932
- Special Commendation, awarded by The Shipwrecked Fishermen and Mariners' Royal Benevolent Society
  Dr Christine Bradshaw, GP – 2007
- Member, Order of the British Empire (MBE)
  John Malcolm Freswick Groat, Honorary Secretary – 1985NYH

=== Foreign awards ===
- Gold Watch, awarded by The Emperor of Germany
  Benjamin Stout, Coxswain – 1891
- £24, awarded by The Emperor of Germany
  Longhope Lifeboat Crew – 1891
- Silver Medal, awarded by the French Government
  William Dass, Coxswain – 1936
- Bronze Medal, awarded by the French Government
  Longhope Lifeboat Crew – 1936
- Norwegian Medal for Heroism, awarded by The King of Norway
  Daniel Kirkpatrick, Coxswain – 1956
- Posthumous awards for Gallantry, from the Academy of Athens
  The crew of the T. G. B. – 1969

== Roll of honour ==
In memory of those lost whilst serving at Longhope:

- Lost when the Longhope lifeboat T. G. B. (ON 962) capsized on service to the Liberian vessel Irene.
  Daniel Kirkpatrick, Coxswain (59)
  Daniel Raymond Kirkpatrick, Bowman (son of Coxswain) (32)
  John Thomas Kirkpatrick, crew member (son of Coxswain) (27)
  Robert Rattray Johnston, Mechanic (62)
  James Johnston, Second Coxswain (son of Mechanic) (30)
  Robert Johnston, crew member (son of Mechanic) (31)
  James Swanson, Assistant Mechanic (59)
  Eric S. McFadyen, crew member (24)

== Longhope lifeboats ==
=== Pulling and Sailing (P&S) lifeboats ===
On station	ON (Note: ON is the RNLI's Official Number of the boat.)	Name	Built	Class	Comments
1874–1891	Pre-592	Dickinson Edleston	1874	37-foot self-righting (P&S)	(Note: 37 ft 0 in (11.28 m) x 9 ft 2 in (2.79 m) (12-oared) self-righting (P&S) lifeboat, legacy of Mr D. Eddleston of Sowerby Bridge, built by Woolfe of Shadwell, London, costing £475.); Condemned in 1891.
1891–1904	307	Samyntas Stannah	1891	39-foot self-righting (P&S)	(Note: 39 ft 0 in (11.89 m) x 9 ft 0 in (2.74 m) (12-oared) self-righting (P&S) lifeboat, legacy of Mrs E. M. Stannah of Balham Hill, built by Forrestt of Limehouse, London, costing £637.); Broken up in 1904.
1904–1906	291	Christopher North Graham	1890	39-foot self-righting (P&S)	(Note: 39 ft 0 in (11.89 m) x 9 ft 0 in (2.74 m) (12-oared) self-righting (P&S) lifeboat, gift of Mrs North Graham and family, of Brighton, built by Forrestt of Limehouse, London, costing £577.); Previously at Thorpeness.
1906–1926	550	Anne Miles	1905	43-foot Watson (P&S)	(Note: 43 ft 0 in (13.11 m) x 12 ft 6 in (3.81 m) (10-oared) Watson-class self-righting (P&S) lifeboat, gift of Miss A. Miles of West Hampstead, built by Thames Ironworks of Blackwall, London, costing £1,759.); Transferred to Howth.

Pre ON numbers are unofficial numbers used by the Lifeboat Enthusiasts' Society to reference early lifeboats not included on the official RNLI list.

=== Motor lifeboats ===
On station	ON	Op.No. (Note: Op.No. is the RNLI's Operational Number of the boat carried on the hull.)	Name	Built	Class	Comments
1926–1933	698	—	K. T. J. S.	1926	45-foot 6in Watson	Transferred to Aith.
1933–1962	759	—	Thomas McCunn	1933	45-foot 6in Watson	Transferred to the Relief fleet. Now preserved at Longhope Lifeboat Museum since 2000.
1962–1969	962	—	T. G. B.	1962	47-foot Watson	Capsized on service on 17 March 1969, with the loss of all eight crew. Later transferred to Arranmore.
1970	889	—	Hilton Briggs	1951	52-foot Barnett (Mk.I)	Lifeboat from the Relief fleet, previously at Aberdeen and Fenit.
1970–1988	1010	48-007	David and Elizabeth King and E. B.	1970	Solent	Transferred to Invergordon.
1988–1999	1138	47-025	Lord Saltoun	1988	Tyne	
1999–2004	1098	52-28	Sir Max Aitken II	1984	Arun	Previously at Stornoway.
2004–2006	1149	52-43	The Queen Mother	1989	Arun	Previously at Thurso.
2006–	1284	16-05	Helen Comrie	2006	Tamar	

More post-service details can be found on the respective lifeboat class pages.

== See also ==
- List of RNLI stations
- List of former RNLI stations
- Royal National Lifeboat Institution lifeboats
