= Houton =

Coordinates: 58.918°N 3.186°W

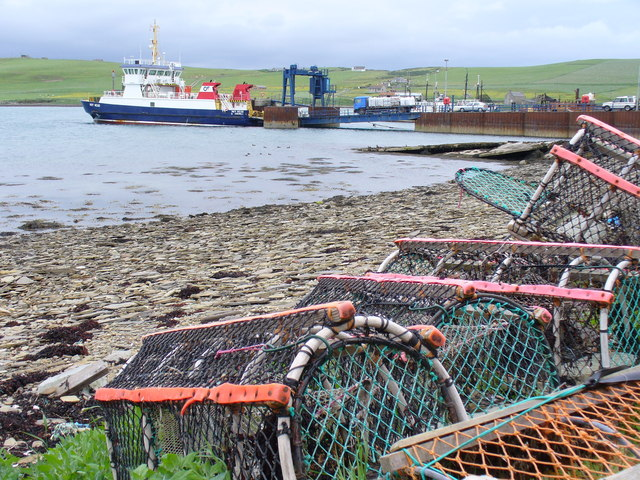
- The Bay of Houton, showing ferry terminal and lobster pots

- Location within Orkney
- OS grid reference: HY317041
- Civil parish: Orphir
- Council area: Orkney Islands
- Lieutenancy area: Orkney Islands
- Country: Scotland
- Sovereign state: United Kingdom
- Post town: ORKNEY
- Postcode district: KW17
- Dialling code: 01856
- Police: Scotland
- Fire: Scottish
- Ambulance: Scottish
- UK Parliament: Orkney and Shetland
- Scottish Parliament: Orkney

Houton is a settlement 5 miles (8.0 km) southeast of Stromness on the island of Mainland, Orkney, Scotland. The settlement is within the parish of Orphir, and is situated on a minor road off the A964.

From here, a ferry sails to Lyness on Hoy, Longhope on South Walls, and the island of Flotta, as well as a smaller ferry for workers of the Flotta oil terminal. Nearby are the remains of the Orphir Round Church, dedicated to St Nicholas (the only medieval round church in Scotland) and the Earl's Bu, the ruins of a former manor house of the Earldom of Orkney. These sites are in the care of Historic Environment Scotland.

The Holm of Houton is nearby.

== RAF Houton ==
RAF Houton was situated nearby and was home to the following units:

- No. 306 (Flying Boat) Flight.
- No. 430 (Seaplane) Flight.
- 'F' Boat Seaplane Training Flight was formed on 15 August 1918 and operated the Felixstowe F.3 and the Curtiss H.16 before being disbanded on 25 November 1918.
- Orkney Wing.
