= Longhope (disambiguation) =

Longhope may refer to:

- Longhope, Gloucestershire, England
- Longhope, Hampshire, England
- Longhope, Orkney, a village in Scotland
- Longhope (bay) an arm of the sea between South Walls and Hoy in Orkney, Scotland
- Long Hope, Eastern Cape a town in South Africa
