= Lyness =

Coordinates: 58.829°N 3.204°W

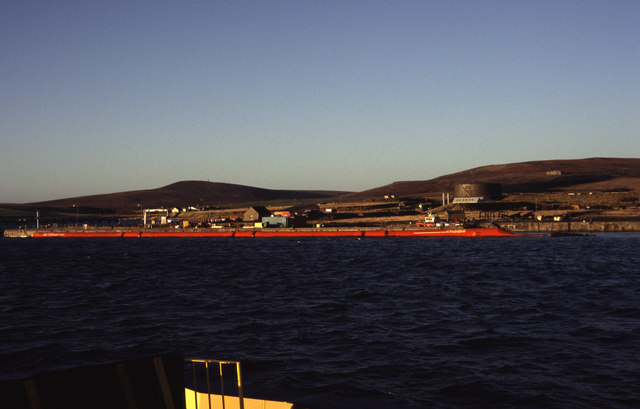
- Approaching Lyness ferry terminal

- Location within Orkney
- OS grid reference: ND305942
- Civil parish: Walls and Flotta
- Council area: Orkney
- Lieutenancy area: Orkney
- Country: Scotland
- Sovereign state: United Kingdom
- Post town: STROMNESS
- Postcode district: KW16
- Dialling code: 01856
- Police: Scotland
- Fire: Scottish
- Ambulance: Scottish
- UK Parliament: Orkney and Shetland
- Scottish Parliament: Orkney

Lyness is a village on the east coast of the island of Hoy, Orkney, Scotland. The village is within the parish of Walls and Flotta, and is situated at the junction of the B9047 and B9048.

During the 1920s, Lyness was briefly the headquarters of the metal salvage firm of Cox and Danks's raising of the German High Seas Fleet, scuttled by the Germans on 21 June 1919 during the Armistice (Scuttling of the German fleet at Scapa Flow).

During the Second World War it was home to HMS Proserpine, the main base for the naval fleet based at Scapa Flow.

In 2010–2011 the Golden Wharf at Lyness Harbour was upgraded to host renewable energy projects, including the Pelamis Wave Energy Converter and the Wello Penguin.

Today an Orkney Ferries Ro-Ro car ferry links it to Longhope on South Walls, the island of Flotta in Scapa Flow, and Houton on Mainland, Orkney.

== Naval Cemetery ==
Lyness Royal Naval Cemetery was opened in 1915 primarily to serve the Scapa Flow base (which closed in 1946). Buried there are 445 Empire and Commonwealth service personnel, chiefly Royal Navy, from World War I (109 of whom are unidentified) and 200 from World War II (8 unidentified). There are also buried here 14 German Navy sailors and 4 other German service personnel, including an unidentified Luftwaffe airman, and one Norwegian war grave. There are also 30 British non-war service burials (including 2 unidentified British Army soldiers). Major naval ship losses represented among the war graves include:

- HMS Hampshire (lost 1916)
- HMS Vanguard (1917) – 18 casualties buried here.
- HMS Narborough (1918)
- HMS Opal (1918)
- HMS Royal Oak (1939) – 26 casualties buried here.
