= 45ft 6in Watson-class lifeboat =

Former RNLI lifeboat class

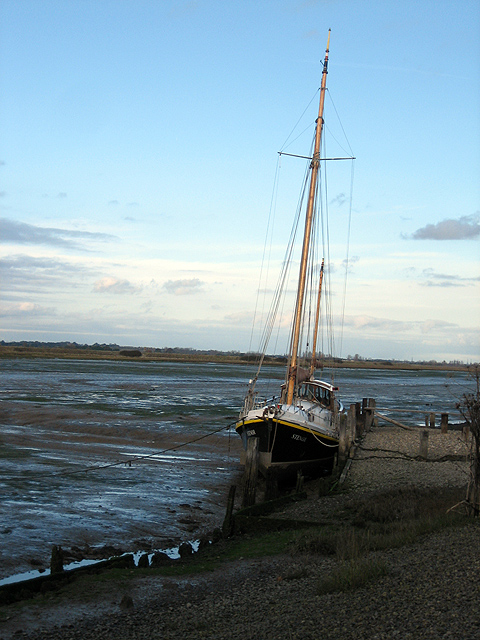
- Formerly RNLB Cecil and Lilian Philpott (ON 730), now Stenoa in 2007

Class overview
- Name: 45ft 6in Watson-class
- Builders: S. E. Saunders Cowes; J. Samuel White Cowes; Saunders-Roe Cowes; Groves & Guttridge, Cowes; Alexander Robertson & Sons Sandbank, Argyll
- Operators: Royal National Lifeboat Institution
- Preceded by: 45ft Watson-class
- Succeeded by: 46ft Watson-class
- Cost: £6,800–£11,000
- Built: 1926–1935
- In service: 1926–1972
- Completed: 22(23)
- Lost: 2
- Retired: 20

General characteristics
- Class & type: 45ft 6in Watson-class motor lifeboat
- Displacement: 19 tons
- Length: 45 ft 6 in (13.87 m)
- Beam: 12 ft 6 in (3.81 m)
- Propulsion: Single engine, 80-bhp Weyburn DE6 6-cyl.petrol; Twin engine, 40-bhp Weyburn CE4 4-cyl. petrol
- Speed: 7 knots
- Crew: 8

The 45ft 6in Watson-class was a non self-righting displacement hull lifeboat, built between 1926 and 1933, and operated by the Royal National Lifeboat Institution (RNLI) between 1926 and 1972.

== History ==
The 45ft 6in Watson-class marked the transition from a single engine, single screw lifeboat, to a twin engine, twin screw layout. The first two boats were similar to the last of the 45-foot Watson-class boats, albeit six inches longer due to a forward raked bow. The third boat was the first with twin engines and twin screws while the fourth had twin engines geared to a single screw, a unique layout in RNLI lifeboat history. The twin screw layout proved to be superior and from the fifth boat onward, this was the layout adopted.

The 45ft 6in Watsons were long lived and most survived at their original stations into the 1950s, when most were replaced by 46-foot 9in and, later in the decade, 47-foot Watsons. Many boats spent their final years in the reserve fleet, with five of the later boats serving until 1969 and one, ON759, continuing in the reserve fleet until 1972.

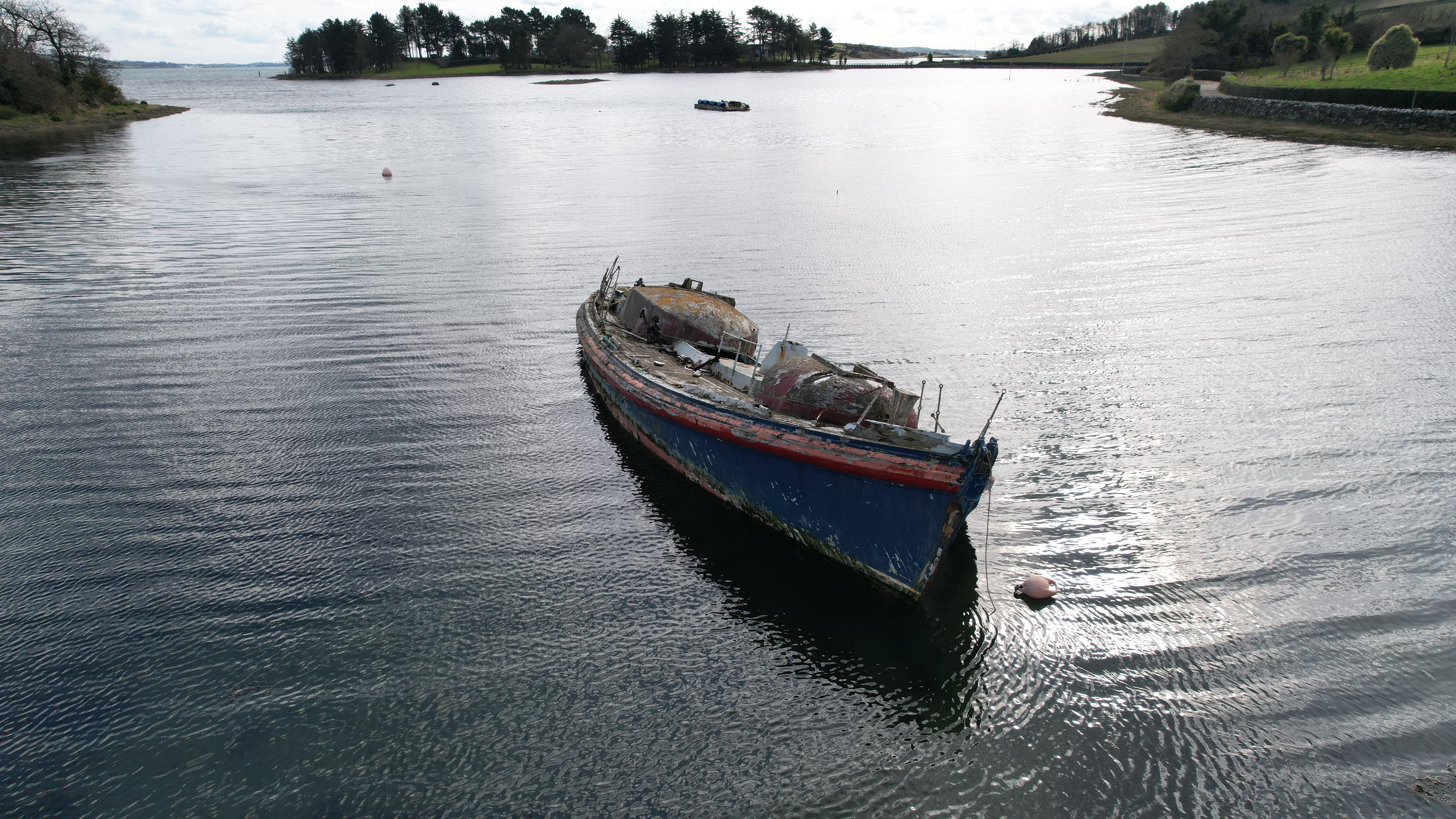
City of Bradford II (ON 709) at Ringhaddy Pier on Strangford Lough in 2023.

During their service, 45ft 6in Watsons launched on service 2,587 times and are credited with saving 2,613 lives. The single biggest contributor being the Humber lifeboat City of Bradford II (ON 709), which in twenty-five years at the station, launched on service 228 times, saving 305 lives.

== Description ==
The 45ft 6in Watsons differed from the previous 45ft type in having flush decks with no end boxes. The aft cockpit had a shelter ahead of it covering the engine room access hatch. Ahead of this was the exhaust funnel and towards the bow was a further small shelter.

The first two boats retained the single engine layout of their predecessors, being powered by the same 80-bhp Weyburn DE6 6-cylinder petrol engines. The third boat (ON 700) was the first twin-engined version, with two 40-bhp Weyburn CE4 4-cylinder petrol engines driving twin screws. The fourth in the series (ON 701) had a unique twin engine, single screw layout which was not repeated. From ON 707 onwards, the twin screw layout was standardised.

The drop keel fitted to the single engine boats was deleted from the twins, and eventually the auxiliary sailing rig was dispensed with on the twins in the light of operational experience.

== Fleet ==
=== Single engine ===
ON (Note: ON is the RNLI's Official Number of the boat.)	Name	Built	In service	Stations	Comments
698	K. T. J. S.	1926	1926–1933	Longhope	(Note: Legacies of Mr King, Mr Turnbull, Mr Jesset and Mrs Sandford, built by S. E. Saunders of Cowes, costing £8,330.); Sold May 1952. Renamed Alton (LO 511), later Alton (BM 160). Wrecked in 1980.
698	K. T. J. S.	1926	1933–1935	Aith	Sold May 1952. Renamed Alton (LO 511), later Alton (BM 160). Wrecked in 1980.
698	K. T. J. S.	1926	1935–1950	Arranmore	Sold May 1952. Renamed Alton (LO 511), later Alton (BM 160). Wrecked in 1980.
698	K. T. J. S.	1926	1950–1952	Relief fleet	Sold May 1952. Renamed Alton (LO 511), later Alton (BM 160). Wrecked in 1980.
699	John Russell	1926	1926–1939	Montrose No.1	(Note: Legacy of Miss A. Russell, built by S. E. Saunders of Cowes, costing £8,273.); Sold July 1956. Renamed Athena. Last reported for sale at Beaulieu, Hampshire, August 2025.
699	John Russell	1926	1939–1953	Relief fleet	Sold July 1956. Renamed Athena. Last reported for sale at Beaulieu, Hampshire, August 2025.
699	John Russell	1926	1953–1954	Fraserburgh	Sold July 1956. Renamed Athena. Last reported for sale at Beaulieu, Hampshire, August 2025.

=== Twin engine ===
ON	Name	Built	In service	Stations	Comments
700	K. E. C. F.	1927	1927–1939	Rosslare Harbour	(Note: Legacies of Mrs Kirby, Mrs Dudley, Mr Kleeman and Miss Potton, built by J. Samuel White of Cowes, costing £11,116.); Twin engine, twin screw. First RNLI lifeboat with Radio. Sold December 1956. Renamed Taob Ruo II, P'teuchti IV and Pteuchti. Broken up at C & J Marina, North Shields, April 2015.
700	K. E. C. F.	1927	1939–1952	Galway Bay	Twin engine, twin screw. First RNLI lifeboat with Radio. Sold December 1956. Renamed Taob Ruo II, P'teuchti IV and Pteuchti. Broken up at C & J Marina, North Shields, April 2015.
700	K. E. C. F.	1927	1952–1956	Relief fleet	Twin engine, twin screw. First RNLI lifeboat with Radio. Sold December 1956. Renamed Taob Ruo II, P'teuchti IV and Pteuchti. Broken up at C & J Marina, North Shields, April 2015.
701	N. T.	1927	1927–1951	Barrow	(Note: Legacy of Mrs Myer, and gift of Mr S. H. Thompson, built by J. Samuel White of Cowes, costing £10,826.); Unique Twin engine, single screw layout. Sold December 1956. Renamed Diana Victoria. Last reported as a workboat on the River Ouse in York, 1987.
701	N. T.	1927	1952–1953	Workington	Unique Twin engine, single screw layout. Sold December 1956. Renamed Diana Victoria. Last reported as a workboat on the River Ouse in York, 1987.
701	N. T.	1927	1953–1956	Relief fleet	Unique Twin engine, single screw layout. Sold December 1956. Renamed Diana Victoria. Last reported as a workboat on the River Ouse in York, 1987.
707	Edward Z. Dresden	1929	1929–1952	Clacton-on-Sea	(Note: Legacy of Mr E. Dresden, built by S. E. Saunders of Cowes, costing £8,496.); First twin engine, twin screw. Sold December 1968. Renamed St Peter. Lost at Troon, 1 September 1984.
707	Edward Z. Dresden	1929	1952–1955	Stronsay	First twin engine, twin screw. Sold December 1968. Renamed St Peter. Lost at Troon, 1 September 1984.
707	Edward Z. Dresden	1929	1955–1968	Relief fleet	First twin engine, twin screw. Sold December 1968. Renamed St Peter. Lost at Troon, 1 September 1984.
708	H. C. J.	1928	1928	Fowey (temp.)	(Note: Legacies of Mr Richardson and Mrs Stephens, and a gift of Mr Fielden, built by J. Samuel White of Cowes, costing £8,390.); Sold in 1962. Renamed Mary Dolan, later Seawitch. At Castletown, Isle of Man, July 2025.
708	H. C. J.	1928	1928–1929	Holyhead (temp.)	Sold in 1962. Renamed Mary Dolan, later Seawitch. At Castletown, Isle of Man, July 2025.
708	H. C. J.	1928	1929–1956	Thurso	Sold in 1962. Renamed Mary Dolan, later Seawitch. At Castletown, Isle of Man, July 2025.
708	H. C. J.	1928	1956–1962	Relief fleet	Sold in 1962. Renamed Mary Dolan, later Seawitch. At Castletown, Isle of Man, July 2025.
709	City of Bradford II	1929	1929–1954	Humber	(Note: Gift of the City of Bradford LB fund, and legacy of Mr M. Howson, built by S. E. Saunders of Cowes, costing £8,662.); Sold December 1968. Renamed Freida and Spurn. As City of Bradford II, beached at Ringhaddy Pier, Strangford Lough, Northern Ireland, December 2025.
709	City of Bradford II	1929	1954–1956	Amble	Sold December 1968. Renamed Freida and Spurn. As City of Bradford II, beached at Ringhaddy Pier, Strangford Lough, Northern Ireland, December 2025.
709	City of Bradford II	1929	1956–1959	Relief fleet	Sold December 1968. Renamed Freida and Spurn. As City of Bradford II, beached at Ringhaddy Pier, Strangford Lough, Northern Ireland, December 2025.
709	City of Bradford II	1929	1960	Broughty Ferry	Sold December 1968. Renamed Freida and Spurn. As City of Bradford II, beached at Ringhaddy Pier, Strangford Lough, Northern Ireland, December 2025.
709	City of Bradford II	1929	1960–1968	Relief fleet	Sold December 1968. Renamed Freida and Spurn. As City of Bradford II, beached at Ringhaddy Pier, Strangford Lough, Northern Ireland, December 2025.
710	White Star	1930	1930–1957	Fishguard	(Note: Gift of the Oceanic Steam Navigation Co., built by J. Samuel White of Cowes, costing £7,878.); Sold June 1968. Renamed Outward Bound, Kurt Hahn Aberdovey, Kurt Hahn and Tunnara. Last reported on a mud berth at Oyster Creek Marina, Canvey Island, July 2024.
710	White Star	1930	1957–1968	Relief fleet	Sold June 1968. Renamed Outward Bound, Kurt Hahn Aberdovey, Kurt Hahn and Tunnara. Last reported on a mud berth at Oyster Creek Marina, Canvey Island, July 2024.
711	James Macfee	1928	1928–1955	Cromarty	(Note: Legacy of Dr J. Macfee, of the Oceanic Steam Navigation Co., built by J. Samuel White of Cowes, costing £8,205.); Sold 1959. Renamed Macfee. Houseboat on Loch Oich at Invergarry, July 2023, last reported abandoned, Sept 2026.
711	James Macfee	1928	1955–1956	Relief fleet	Sold 1959. Renamed Macfee. Houseboat on Loch Oich at Invergarry, July 2023, last reported abandoned, Sept 2026.
711	James Macfee	1928	1956–1957	Thurso	Sold 1959. Renamed Macfee. Houseboat on Loch Oich at Invergarry, July 2023, last reported abandoned, Sept 2026.
711	James Macfee	1928	1957–1959	Relief fleet	Sold 1959. Renamed Macfee. Houseboat on Loch Oich at Invergarry, July 2023, last reported abandoned, Sept 2026.
712	C. D. E. C.	1928	1928–1954	Fowey	(Note: Legacies of Mr Nottage, Miss Moss, Mrs Liddell and Mrs Picking, built by J. Samuel White of Cowes, costing £8,309.); Sold 1959. Renamed Thameserver. Last reported to be semi-derelict at Leigh-on-Sea, October 2023.
712	C. D. E. C.	1928	1954–1959	Relief fleet	Sold 1959. Renamed Thameserver. Last reported to be semi-derelict at Leigh-on-Sea, October 2023.
713	Elizabeth Elson	1929	1929–1957	Angle	(Note: Legacy of Mr B. Elson, built by J. Samuel White of Cowes, costing £8,253.); Sold December 1968. Last reported at Kenmare in County Kerry, Ireland, May 2023
713	Elizabeth Elson	1929	1957–1968	Relief fleet	Sold December 1968. Last reported at Kenmare in County Kerry, Ireland, May 2023
714	H. F. Bailey	1928	1928–1929	Cromer No.1	(Note: Legacy of Mr H. F. Bailey, built by S. E. Saunders of Cowes, costing £8,470.); Transferred to Selsey and renamed Canadian Pacific, 1929. Destroyed by fire during maintenance at Groves & Guttridge, Cowes, 18 June 1937.
714	Canadian Pacific	1928	1929–1937	Selsey	Transferred to Selsey and renamed Canadian Pacific, 1929. Destroyed by fire during maintenance at Groves & Guttridge, Cowes, 18 June 1937.
716	Sarah Ward and William David Crossweller	1929	1929–1958	Courtmacsherry Harbour	(Note: Legacy of Mr Crossweller, built by J. Samuel White of Cowes, costing £8,454.); Sold in 1961. Renamed Lady Leigh IV, Court McSherry. As Courtmacsherry at Saint Peter Port, Guernsey, September 2025.
716	Sarah Ward and William David Crossweller	1929	1958–1959	Relief fleet	Sold in 1961. Renamed Lady Leigh IV, Court McSherry. As Courtmacsherry at Saint Peter Port, Guernsey, September 2025.
716	Sarah Ward and William David Crossweller	1929	1959–1961	Whitehills	Sold in 1961. Renamed Lady Leigh IV, Court McSherry. As Courtmacsherry at Saint Peter Port, Guernsey, September 2025.
728	Cunard	1930	1930–1955	St Mary's	(Note: Gift of Cunard Steamship Co., built by Saunders-Roe of Cowes, costing £8,324.); Sold in 1969. Renamed Henry Joy. Reported as being ashore at Coney Island, Killough, Northern Ireland, December 2025.
728	Cunard	1930	1955–1969	Relief fleet	Sold in 1969. Renamed Henry Joy. Reported as being ashore at Coney Island, Killough, Northern Ireland, December 2025.
729	John R. Webb	1930	1930–1955	Tenby	(Note: Legacy of Mr J. R. Webb, built by Saunders-Roe of Cowes, costing £8,318.); Sold September 1969. Renamed Rairewa II. Last reported to have been moved to Poland, 1969
729	John R. Webb	1930	1955–1969	Relief fleet	Sold September 1969. Renamed Rairewa II. Last reported to have been moved to Poland, 1969
730	Cecil and Lilian Philpott	1930	1930–1959	Newhaven	(Note: Gift of Mrs L. Philpott, built by J. Samuel White of Cowes, costing £7,982.); Sold October 1969. Renamed Stenoa. At Titchmarsh Marina, Walton-on-the-Naze, May 2025.
730	Cecil and Lilian Philpott	1930	1959–1969	Relief fleet	Sold October 1969. Renamed Stenoa. At Titchmarsh Marina, Walton-on-the-Naze, May 2025.
732	Catherine	1930	–	Bombay	(Note: Built by J. Samuel White); Built for Bombay Port Trust. Last reported sold in 1935.
736	W. and S.	1931	1931–1960	Penlee	(Note: Legacies of Miss Young and Miss Coode, built by J. Samuel White of Cowes, costing £7,684.); Sold in 1970. Renamed Early Mist, later Atlantic. Reported broken up at Bathside, Harwich, September 2025.
736	W. and S.	1931	1960–1961	Buckie	Sold in 1970. Renamed Early Mist, later Atlantic. Reported broken up at Bathside, Harwich, September 2025.
736	W. and S.	1931	1961–1969	Relief fleet	Sold in 1970. Renamed Early Mist, later Atlantic. Reported broken up at Bathside, Harwich, September 2025.
749	George and Sarah Strachan	1931	1931–1959	Dunbar	(Note: Legacy of Mr Strachan, built by J. Samuel White of Cowes, costing £7,680.); Sold in March 1969. Last reported as a workboat at Dunoon, November 2013.
749	George and Sarah Strachan	1931	1959–1960	Relief fleet	Sold in March 1969. Last reported as a workboat at Dunoon, November 2013.
749	George and Sarah Strachan	1931	1960–1963	Exmouth	Sold in March 1969. Last reported as a workboat at Dunoon, November 2013.
749	George and Sarah Strachan	1931	1964–1969	Relief fleet	Sold in March 1969. Last reported as a workboat at Dunoon, November 2013.
753	Civil Service No.5	1932	1932–1950	Donaghadee	(Note: Gift of the Civil Service LB fund, built by J. Samuel White of Cowes, costing £7,294.); Sold February 1958. Renamed Donaghadee, Loe Trout, Silver Sea, Silver Bay, Lorelei, and White Star. At the former Titanic Museum, Clacknaharry Road, Muirtown Basin, Inverness, May 2025.
753	Civil Service No.5	1932	1950–1956	Port St Mary	Sold February 1958. Renamed Donaghadee, Loe Trout, Silver Sea, Silver Bay, Lorelei, and White Star. At the former Titanic Museum, Clacknaharry Road, Muirtown Basin, Inverness, May 2025.
753	Civil Service No.5	1932	1956–1958	Relief fleet	Sold February 1958. Renamed Donaghadee, Loe Trout, Silver Sea, Silver Bay, Lorelei, and White Star. At the former Titanic Museum, Clacknaharry Road, Muirtown Basin, Inverness, May 2025.
759	Thomas McCunn	1933	1933–1962	Longhope	(Note: Legacy of Mr W. McCunn, built by Groves & Guttridge of Cowes, costing £7,120.); Sold August 1972. Renamed Pentland Speir. Restored as Thomas McCunn, and on display since December 2000 at Longhope Lifeboat Museum, December 2025.
759	Thomas McCunn	1933	1962–1972	Relief fleet	Sold August 1972. Renamed Pentland Speir. Restored as Thomas McCunn, and on display since December 2000 at Longhope Lifeboat Museum, December 2025.
774	Charlotte Elizabeth	1935	1935–1959	Islay	(Note: Gift of Miss E. Sinclair, built by Alexander Robertson & Sons of Sandbank, Argyll, costing £8,381.); Sold in 1961. Renamed Corgarth and Dale Queen. Last reported cut in two at Thurso River Quay and stored on wasteland, September 2021.
774	Charlotte Elizabeth	1935	1959–1961	Relief fleet	Sold in 1961. Renamed Corgarth and Dale Queen. Last reported cut in two at Thurso River Quay and stored on wasteland, September 2021.
775	Mona	1935	1935–1959	Broughty Ferry	(Note: An anonymous gift, built by Groves & Guttridge of Cowes, costing £6,802.); Capsized on service with eight crew lost, 8 December 1959. Boat later burned on the beach.

== See also ==
- Watson-class lifeboat
- Royal National Lifeboat Institution lifeboats
