= Longhope Lifeboat Museum =

Museum in the Orkney Islands, Scotland

Coordinates: 58.77963°N 3.22796°W

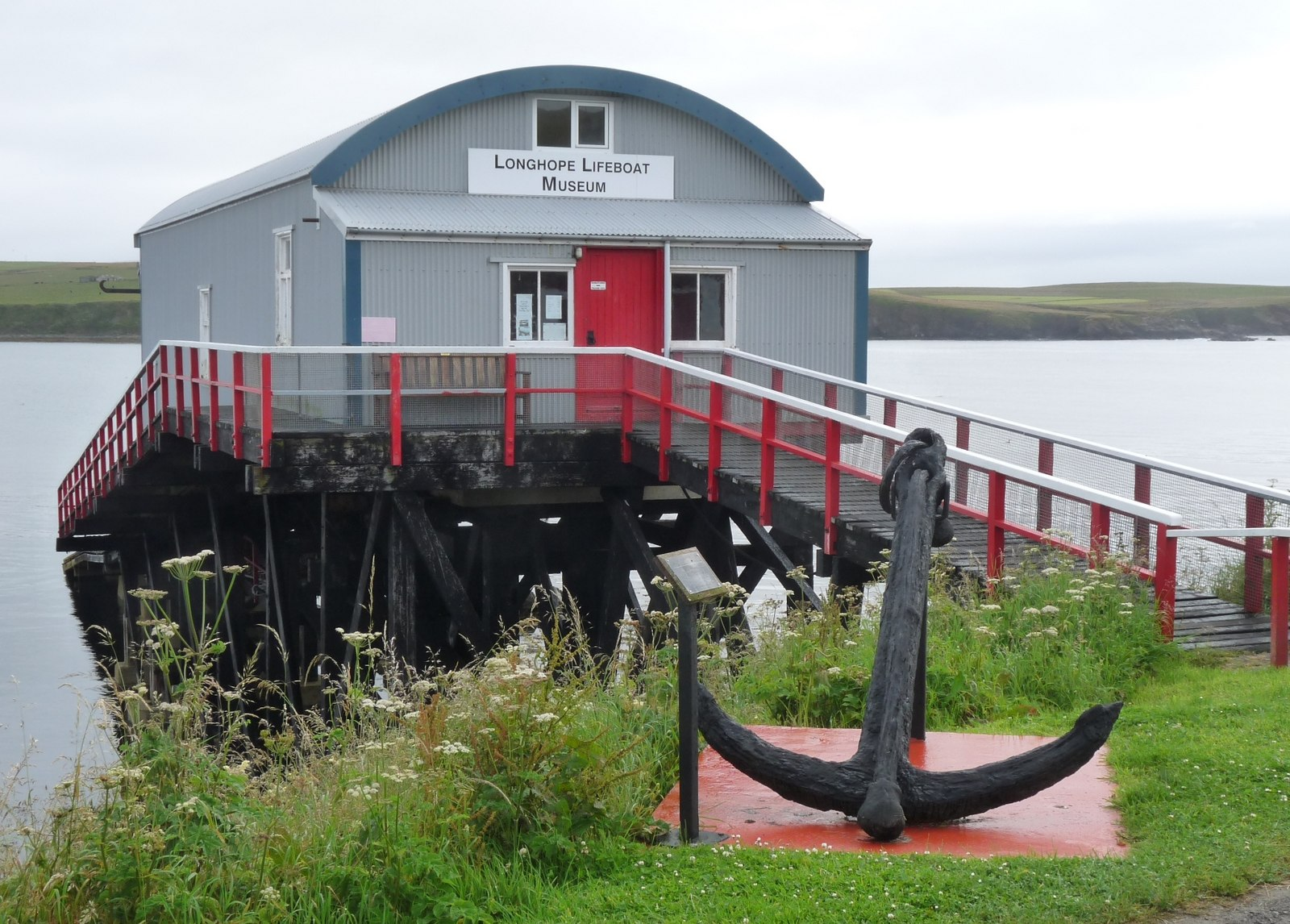
- Longhope Lifeboat Museum in July 2010
- Established: 28 May 2002; 24 years ago
- Location: Brims, Orkney, Scotland
- Owner: Private

Longhope Lifeboat Museum is a museum at Brims on the island of Hoy in the Orkney Islands, Scotland. The museum's main exhibit is the former lifeboat Thomas McCunn, the lifeboat that served the islands of Hoy and South Walls between 1933 and 1962.

== History ==
The Longhope Lifeboat Museum is housed in the former RNLI Longhope Lifeboat Station building which was opened in 1901. In 1999, the lifeboat station closed and was replaced with a new station in the village of Longhope, on the adjacent island of South Walls, connected to Hoy by a causeway.

The Longhope Lifeboat Museum Trust was established in 2000 by the local community of Hoy and South Walls, with the goal of establishing a museum dedicated to the history of lifeboats in Hoy. The museum was officially opened by HRH the Princess Royal on 28 May 2002.
