= Brims, Orkney =

Coordinates: 58.78°N 3.23°W

Brims
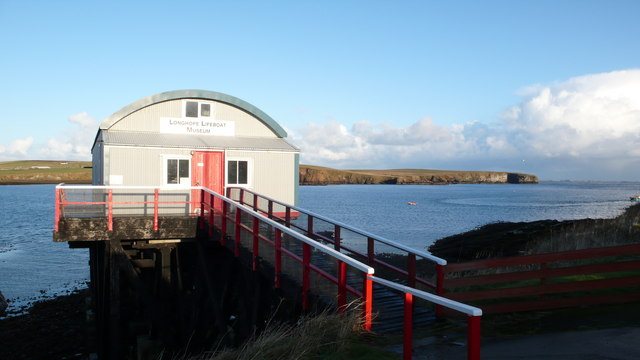
- Longhope Lifeboat Museum, Brims

- Location within Orkney
- Population: 30
- OS grid reference: ND286887
- Civil parish: Walls and Flotta
- Council area: Orkney
- Lieutenancy area: Orkney
- Country: Scotland
- Sovereign state: United Kingdom
- Post town: STROMNESS
- Postcode district: KW16
- Dialling code: 01856
- Police: Scotland
- Fire: Scottish
- Ambulance: Scottish
- UK Parliament: Orkney and Shetland
- Scottish Parliament: Orkney

Brims is a village at the southern point of the island of Hoy, in Orkney, Scotland. The settlement is within the parish of Walls and Flotta. The RNLI lifeboat Thomas McCunn is on display at the Longhope Lifeboat Museum in Brims, which was the Longhope Lifeboat Station until 1999.
