= Arranmore Lifeboat Station =

RNLI lifeboat station in County Donegal, Ireland

- Arranmore Lifeboat Station in 2025

- Location within Ireland

General information
- Type: RNLI Lifeboat Station
- Location: Poolawaddy, Arranmore, County Donegal, Ireland
- Coordinates: 54°59′50.0″N 8°29′54.0″W
- Opened: November 1883
- Owner: Royal National Lifeboat Institution

Website
- Arranmore RNLI Lifeboat Station

Arranmore Lifeboat Station is at Poolawaddy, a hamlet on the eastern coast of Arranmore (Árainn Mhór) Island, approximately 2 miles (3.2 km) north of Leabgarrow, the islands largest settlement. Arranmore, or Aran Island (not to be confused with the Aran Islands off County Galway), is located in County Donegal, on the north west coast of Ireland.

A lifeboat station was first established on Arranmore in 1883 by the Royal National Lifeboat Institution (RNLI).

The station currently operates 17-22 Myrtle Maud (ON 1244), a Severn-class All-weather lifeboat, on station since 2000.

== History ==
It was reported in the February 1884 edition of The Lifeboat journal, that following application by local residents, a lifeboat station had been established at Arranmore Island, on the north-west coast of Ireland.

The coast in this direction is mostly ironbound (harsh and rugged) and unsuitable for lifeboat work; but here there are occasional small inlets or coves with patches of sand where a lifeboat can be made available, and as lives have been lost from shipwrecks on the island on account of there being no suitable boat to put off to save the perishing seamen, the Committee decided to place a lifeboat there.

— The Life-boat, Vol. XII, Issue. 131, 1 February 1884

It was noted that little financial help had been forthcoming locally, but that a management committee had been formed, and a good coxswain and willing crew had been found. A site for a boathouse and slipway had been granted by landowner Lt. F. Charley, and a lifeboat house was constructed at Leabgarrow, at a cost of £420.

A 37-foot lifeboat had been transported by rail to Liverpool, and then shipped free of charge aboard a vessel of the Belfast Steamship Company to Londonderry, from where it was towed to its station by a H.M. Coastguard cruiser, arriving in November 1883. The cost of the lifeboat and equipment was defrayed from the legacy of £448-19s-0d of the late Rev. Richard J. O. Vandeleur of Dublin, the lifeboat duly being named Vandeleur.

On 19 July 1887, a man suffering Delirium tremens was seen in drifting towards the rocks in a small punt. A sergeant of the Royal Irish Constabulary put out in a small boat with two other men, and rescued the man. Sergeant Patrick McPhillips was awarded the RNLI Silver Medal.

In 1893, the slipway was extended at a cost of £225, but from 1901, the lifeboat was stored on the beach at Rannagh Point on Rossillion Bay for service during winter. A new lifeboat house was subsequently constructed at Rannagh in 1903 54°58′15.9″N 8°31′23.3″W, and the old boathouse at Leabgarrow was sold for £100.

The lifeboat house at Rannagh Point suffered a lightning strike in 1916. The lifeboat was relocated back to Leabgarrow in the 1930s.

One of the regular calls on the Arranmore lifeboat, has been to evacuate seriously ill people to the mainland. On one such occasion, the Arranmore 47-foot Watson-class lifeboat T. G. B. (ON 962) put out at 19:45 on 29 November 1966, into a north-west gale and rough seas, to transfer a serious ill boy with acute appendicitis, from Tory Island to Burtonport. The poor conditions prevented a helicopter evacuation. The boy and his father were eventually landed at Burtonport at 03:30, after a journey which would save the boy's life. Coxswain Philip Byrne was awarded the RNLI Silver Medal, with 'The Thanks of the Institution inscribed on Vellum' accorded to the rest of the crew.

Tyne-class lifeboat 47-009 William Luckin (ON 1111) was called to the assistance of the fishing boat Locative on 9 March 1990, which had suffered engine failure in a force-9 gale. A helicopter evacuation had been initially unsuccessful, but a tow was established to bring the vessel around into the wind, allowing the crew to be winched up to the helicopter. Second Coxswain/Mechanic J. O’Donnell was presented with 'A Framed Letter of Thanks, signed by the Chairman of the Institution'.

In 1997, a new station was constructed at Poolawaddy, just to the north of Leabgarrow. The station was official opened on 1 August 1997 by singer Daniel O'Donnell.

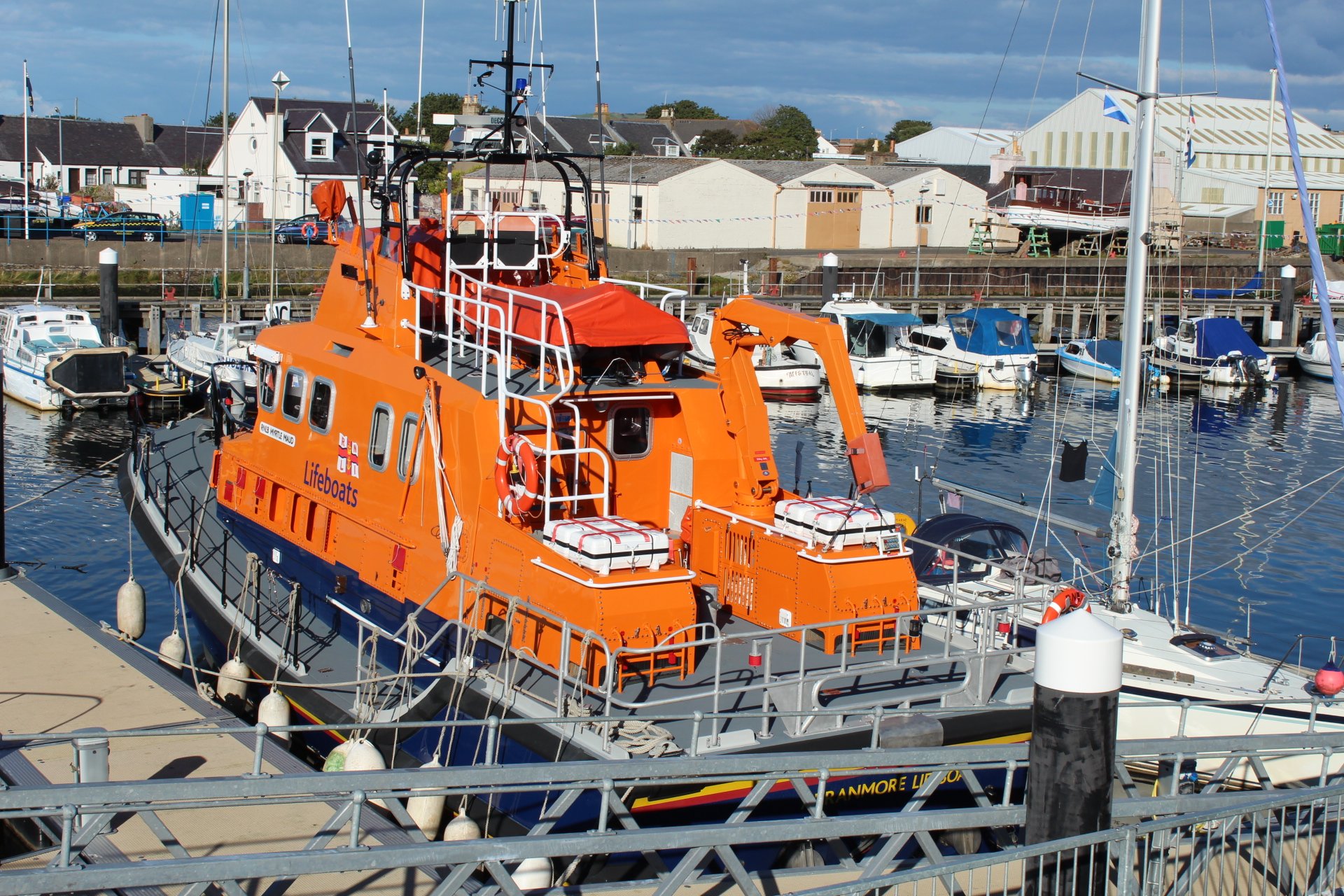
Arranmore Severn-class lifeboat 17-22 Myrtle Maud (ON 1244)

For the rescue of the sole occupant of the yacht Nephele on 2 July 2005, in seas in excess of 10 metres (33 ft) in height, and south westerly gale force 10/11 winds, 'The Thanks of the Institution inscribed on Vellum' was accorded to Coxswain Anthony Kavanagh, and 'A Collective Letter of Thanks, signed by the Chairman of the Institution', was presented to the rest of the crew. The Arranmore Severn-class lifeboat 17-22 Myrtle Maud (ON 1244) had been on service for over 20 hours.

In 2024, 31 years after the station was relocated to Poolawaddy, Arranmore would benefit from the construction of new station facilities. The new boathouse, costing €1.4 million, was designed to accommodate the lifeboat crew, and to house the boarding boats for the station’s Severn-class lifeboat, which sits on a mooring. The station has been fitted with a new changing room, training room, crew area and offices. A ground source heat pump heats the station and provides hot water, while PV cells located on the south facing roof generate electricity, aiding the RNLI’s goal to achieve zero carbon emissions. At a ceremony on 7 September 2024, the station was formally handed to the care of Arranmore RNLI by recently appointed RNLI Chief Executive Peter Sparkes.

== Notable Rescues ==
In the early hours of 7 December 1940, the 3,500 ton Dutch steamer Stolwijk, on convoy duty, with a crew of 28, was forced on to a reef of rocks to the east of Tory Island. The lifeboat crew were assembled by 00:30, but such were the hurricane conditions, that it was decided to wait until 06:30, before launching the Arranmore lifeboat K. T. J. S. (ON 698). During the night, crew from a Destroyer had attempted a rescue, but four crew were lost, including the Captain. 10 men from the Stolwijk had put out in the ship's boat, but the boat was smashed, and all 10 were lost.

Arriving on scene, the lifeboat set about to anchor and veer down, fire a line, and set up a Breeches buoy system. One by one, taking 5 minutes every time, each man was transferred across to the lifeboat. Twice the anchor failed, needing the line to be re-established, but eventually, over a period of 4 hours, the remaining 18 men aboard the Stolwijk were rescued. Eight medals for gallantry were awarded by the RNLI, with Coxswain John Boyle being awarded the RNLI Gold Medal.

Matching awards of medals were made by Queen Wilhelmina of the Netherlands. Each medal was accompanied by a copy of the decree, in which the Queen said the medal had been awarded for ‘exceptionally outstanding courage, unselfishness and devotion to duty’.

== Station honours ==
The following are awards made at Arranmore:

- RNLI Gold Medal
  John Boyle, Coxswain – 1941
- Gold Medal for Gallantry and decree, awarded by the Queen of the Netherlands
  John Boyle, Coxswain – 1941
- RNLI Silver Medal
  Sergeant Patrick McPhillips, Royal Irish Constabulary – 1887
  Teague Ward, Motor Mechanic – 1941
  Philip Byrne, Coxswain – 1967
- Silver Medal for Gallantry and decree, awarded by the Queen of the Netherlands
  Teague Ward, Motor Mechanic – 1941
- RNLI Bronze Medal
  Philip Boyle, crew member – 1941
  Philip Byrne, crew member – 1941
  Neil Byrne, crew member – 1941
  Bryan Gallagher, crew member – 1941
  Patrick O'Donnell, crew member – 1941
  Joseph Rogers, crew member – 1941
- Bronze Medal for Gallantry and decree, awarded by the Queen of the Netherlands
  Philip Boyle, crew member – 1941
  Philip Byrne, crew member – 1941
  Neil Byrne, crew member – 1941
  Bryan Gallagher, crew member – 1941
  Patrick O'Donnell, crew member – 1941
  Joseph Rogers, crew member – 1941
- 'The Thanks of the Institution inscribed on Vellum'
  Arranmore Lifeboat Crew – 1967
  Anthony Kavanagh, Coxswain – 2006
- 'A collective Thanks of the Institution inscribed on Vellum'
  Arranmore Lifeboat Coxswain and Crew – 1964
- 'A Framed Letter of Thanks signed by the Chairman of the Institution'
  J. O’Donnell, Second Coxswain/Mechanic – 1991
  Francis Bonner, Coxswain – 1995
- 'A Collective Framed Letter of Thanks, signed by the Chairman of the Institution'
  Arranmore Lifeboat Crew – 2006

== Roll of honour ==
In memory of those lost whilst serving at Arranmore:

- Died in a boarding boat accident, 27 December 1930
  Hugh McGill, Motor Mechanic

== Arranmore lifeboats ==
=== Pulling and Sailing (P&S) lifeboats ===
ON (Note: ON is the RNLI's Official Number of the boat.)	Name	Built	On station	Class	Comments
311	Vandeleur	1883	1883–1902	37-foot self-righting (P&S)	(Note: 37 ft 0 in (11.28 m) x 8 ft 0 in (2.44 m) (12-oared) self-righting (P&S) lifeboat, legacy of Mr R. Vandeleur of Dublin, built by Woolfe of Shadwell, London, costing £410.); Sold in 1903.
490	La Totitam	1902	1902–1929	37-foot self-righting (P&S)	(Note: 37 ft 0 in (11.28 m) x 9 ft 3 in (2.82 m) (10-oared) self-righting (P&S) lifeboat, legacy of Miss E. Brooke of Londonderry, built by Thames ironworks of Blackwall, London, costing £901.); Sold in 1929.

=== Motor lifeboats ===
ON	Op.No. (Note: Op.No. is the RNLI's Operational Number of the boat carried on the hull.)	Name	Built	On station	Class	Comments
463	–	Albert Edward	1901	1929–1932	45-foot Watson (motor)	Previously at Clacton-on-Sea.
595	–	William and Laura	1909	1932–1935	43-foot Watson	Previously at Donaghadee.
698	–	K. T. J. S.	1926	1935–1950	45-foot 6in Watson	Previously at Longhope and Aith.
855	–	W. M. Tilson	1949	1950–1969	46-foot 9in Watson	
962	–	T. G. B.	1962	1969–1978	47-foot Watson	Previously at Longhope.
943	–	Claude Cecil Stanforth	1958	1978–1985	52-foot Barnett (Mk.II)	Previously at Lerwick.
924	–	Archibald and Alexander M. Paterson	1955	1985–1986	52-foot Barnett (Mk.I)	Previously at Stromness. Transferred to Lowestoft.
1111	47-009	William Luckin	1986	1986–2000	Tyne	Transferred to Lough Swilly
1244	17-22	Myrtle Maud	1999	2000–	Severn	

== See also ==
- List of RNLI stations
- List of former RNLI stations
- Royal National Lifeboat Institution lifeboats

== Sources ==
- Leonard, Richie; Denton, Tony (2026). Lifeboat Enthusiasts Handbook 2026. Lifeboats Enthusiasts' Society.
