= Hoy, Orkney =

Island in the Orkney Islands group

Hoy
Eilean Thothaigh (Gaelic); Hoy (Scots)
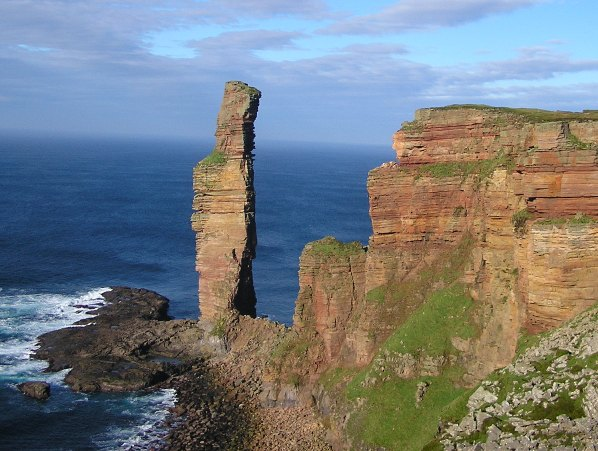
- The Old Man of Hoy, at the western side of the island, seen from the south

Location
- Hoy shown within Orkney
- OS grid reference: ND263961
- Coordinates: 58.83°N 3.3°W

Name
- Name meaning: high island
- Old Norse name: Háey

Physical geography
- Island group: Orkney
- Area: 14,318 ha (55.28 sq mi)
- Area rank: 12
- Highest elevation: Ward Hill, 481 m (1,578 ft)

Administration
- Council area: Orkney Islands
- Country: Scotland
- Sovereign state: United Kingdom

Demographics
- Population: 392 (Note: Including South Walls.)
- Population rank: 24
- Population density: 2.7/km^{2} (7.0/sq mi)
- Largest settlement: Lyness

Hoy (from Old Norse Háey, meaning "high island") is an island in Orkney, Scotland, measuring 143 square kilometres (55 sq mi) – the second largest in the archipelago, after Mainland. A natural causeway, the Ayre, links the island to the smaller South Walls; the two islands are treated as one entity by the UK census. Hoy is also the name of a hamlet in the northwest of the island.

== Geography ==
At 14,318 ha (35,380 acres) in extent, Hoy is the 12th largest of Scotland's islands. It is also the "highest and wildest and wettest (1,500 mm or 59 in of annual rainfall) of all the Orkney islands".

The Old Man of Hoy, a sea stack formed from Old Red Sandstone, can be found in the northwest on the Rackwick coast. It is one of the tallest stacks in the United Kingdom at a height of 137 metres (449 ft). The Old Man is popular with climbers, and was first climbed in 1966. Created by the erosion of a cliff through hydraulic action sometime after 1750, the stack is no more than a few hundred years old, and a painting from 1817 shows the stack with an arch at the bottom which has now further eroded and no longer remains. It may soon collapse into the sea.

The dramatic coastline of Hoy can be seen by visitors travelling to Orkney by ferry from the Scottish mainland. It has some of the highest sea cliffs in the UK at St John's Head, which reach 350 metres (1,150 ft).

The name "Hoy" comes from the Norse word Háey meaning "high island". The island of Hoy is the most mountainous in the Orkney archipelago. The highest point on the island (and the whole archipelago) is in the north at Ward Hill, which stands at 481 metres (1,578 ft). There is a trig point at the summit.

The main settlements on the island are Lyness, Rackwick and Quoyness. Longhope is a village on neighbouring South Walls. A road linking Hoy to South Walls was constructed towards the end of the 19th century. Prior to that time the latter had only been accessible by land across the shingle beach of the Ayre at low tide. The status of South Walls is now considered by some writers as a peninsula attached to Hoy and by others as still being an island. For example neither the 2001 or 2011 censuses mention South Walls in their lists of inhabited islands and Haswell-Smith states that South Walls "was an island" until the causeway over the Ayre was constructed. The Gazetteer for Scotland states that it is "a peninsula, sometimes described as an island."

The island is part of the Hoy and West Mainland National Scenic Area, one of 40 in Scotland.

== History ==
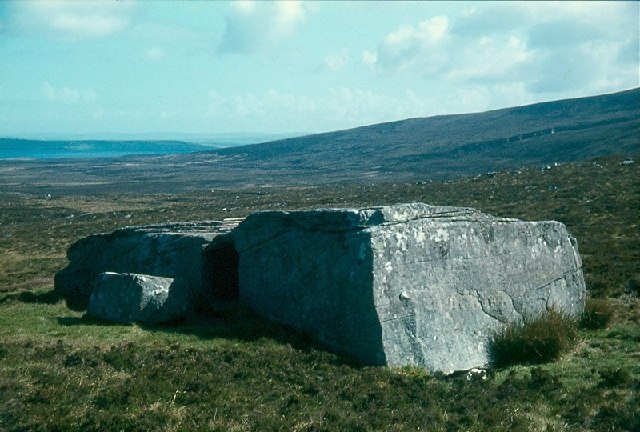
The Dwarfie Stane

=== Prehistory ===
The Dwarfie Stane lies in the north of the Rackwick valley and dates back to around 3000 BCE. It is unique in northern Europe, bearing similarity to Neolithic or Bronze Age tombs around the Mediterranean. The tomb has a small rectangular entrance and cleft, hence its name. (Note: Dwarfie is a diminutive of "dwarf", while stane is the Scots form of "stone".)

=== 19th century ===
The two most northerly Martello Towers in the UK stand here, built in 1814 to defend merchant shipping in the natural harbour of Longhope against privateers commissioned by United States President James Madison, who declared war in 1812.

=== World Wars ===
The main naval base for the British fleet in both the First and Second World Wars, Scapa Flow, was at Lyness in the southeast of the island.

During the Second World War, Lyness was developed as HMS Proserpine, a naval base supporting the Home Fleet at Scapa Flow; by 1940 more than 12,000 military and civilian personnel were stationed there. The base became a self-contained settlement with accommodation, recreational and practical facilities. Its wartime infrastructure included the Golden Wharf, an expanded wharf completed during the Second World War and nicknamed for its high cost, and the former Naval Headquarters and Communications Centre on Wee Fea, built in 1943 to replace an earlier communications centre.

== Demographics ==
Although the population of Hoy is now only around 400, there was a much larger population in the past. In 1890 there were four schools on the island and four churches, suggesting a much larger population. Despite the larger population there was no paved road between the north of the island and the south, only a footpath. There was, however, an unsurfaced road between the two villages on the north of the isle; Rackwick and Moaness.

== Transport ==
=== Ferry ===
Orkney Ferries operate two services to Hoy:

- A ro-ro vehicle ferry between Houton on Orkney Mainland and Lyness on Hoy. Some crossings are via Flotta. Foot passengers may also travel to Longhope, South Walls where the ferry is berthed overnight.
- A small passenger ferry between Stromness on Orkney Mainland and Moaness on Hoy via the small island of Graemsay.
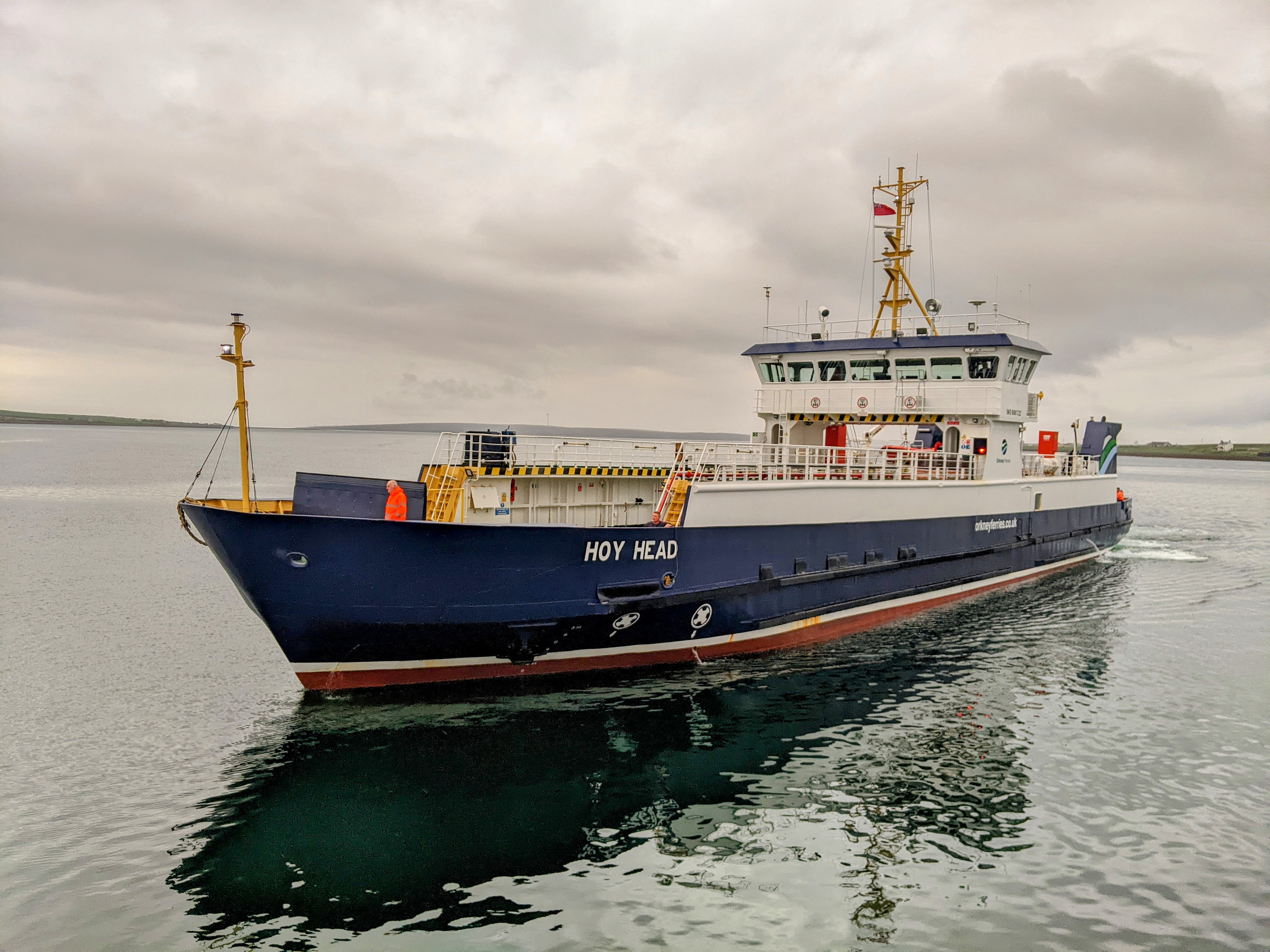
- MV Hoy Head, the Houton, Lyness, Flotta and Longhope ferry.
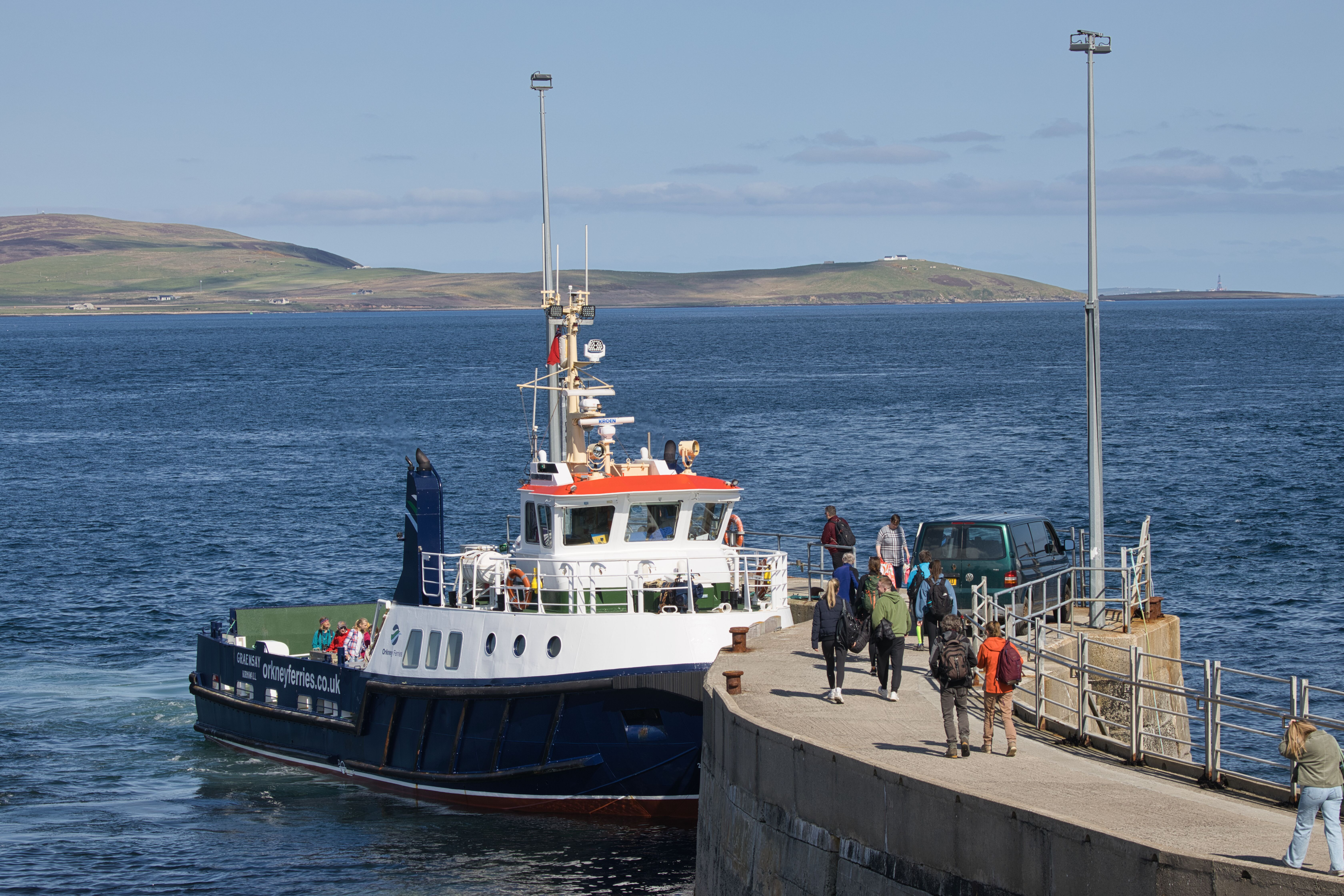
- MV Graemsay, the Stromness, Graemsay and Moaness ferry at Moaness pier

=== Bus ===
The Hoy and Walls Community Bus provides a regular timetabled bus service across the islands of Hoy and Walls. The buses go from Moaness on Hoy to Hackness on South Walls, via Linksness, Lyness, North Walls, Brims, and Longhope.

=== Airport ===
There have been two airfields on South Walls, perhaps due to its connections with the navy. One on the southern coast (Snelsetter) which opened in August 1934 and was closed at the end of World War Two; it was used by military and civil aircraft, and now is open land. Another, just east of the causeway that links the two islands of Hoy and South Walls, opened in November 1972 and closed in 1993. It was used by civilian aircraft solely and was operated by the airline Loganair; it is also now open land, used as an emergency landing strip only. The first flight to a nearby island of Flotta on 1 March 1977 was recorded to have landed at Hoy.

== Longhope lifeboat station ==
A lifeboat has been on Hoy since 1874, at first housed in a prominent stone building close to the west end of the causeway that links the two islands of Hoy and South Walls. It was stationed there as it meant that the lifeboat could be dragged over wooden skids into the sea in either North Bay, giving access to Scapa Flow, or in Aith Hope, an offshoot of the notorious Pentland Firth to the south. The shed continued to serve as the base of the Longhope lifeboat until 1906.

The replacement lifeboat station stands slightly to the south of the original station cost £2,700 to build in 1906 and was in use until 1999. On 17 March 1969 whilst based here, the lifeboat T.G.B. (ON 962) capsized while on service to the Liberian vessel Irene. Her entire crew of eight lost their lives. This station is now the home of the Longhope Lifeboat Museum, which has on display lifeboat Thomas McCunn, stationed here from 1933 to 1962.

In 2000 an Arun-class lifeboat, Sir Max Aitken II became the Longhope lifeboat. This class was designed to stay permanently afloat, and the decision was taken to move her to purpose-built moorings at Longhope pier. The lifeboats that have served here since have also been stationed at Longhope, including the current vessel the Helen Comrie (a Tamar-class lifeboat) and her predecessor The Queen Mother, which was based here between 2004 and 2006. A station has been built where the lifeboat is moored at Longhope which is also the main harbour for boats to and from the island.

It is one of three lifeboat stations in Orkney, the others being Stromness Lifeboat Station, and Kirkwall Lifeboat Station.

== Mythology ==
In Norse mythology, Hoy hosted Hjaðningavíg, the never-ending battle between Heðin and Högni.

== Wildlife ==
Hoy is an Important Bird Area. The northern part of the island is an RSPB reserve due to its importance for birdlife, particularly great skuas and red-throated divers. It was sold to the RSPB by the Hoy Trust for a nominal amount. Anastrepta orcadensis, a liverwort also known as Orkney Notchwort, was first discovered on Ward Hill by William Jackson Hooker in 1808.

The northern and western parts of Hoy, along with much of the adjoining sea area, is designated as a Special Protection Area due to its importance for nine breeding bird species: arctic skua, fulmar, great black-backed gull, great skua, guillemot, Black-legged kittiwake, peregrine falcon, puffin and red-throated diver. The area is important for its seabird assemblage, which regularly supports 120,000 individual seabirds during the breeding season.

One of Orkney's few woodlands is found on Hoy, and is among the most northerly areas of woodland in the UK. Patches of the woodland are scattered across the island. As of 2024, the IUCN has declared that the local Orkney charr (Salvelinus inframundus), documented in 1908 at Heldale Water and last seen in the 1950s, is extinct.

== In popular culture ==
Hoy is featured prominently in the 1984 music video for "Here Comes The Rain Again" by the Eurythmics.

Hoy has a performing arts theatre, the Gable End Theatre, which opened in 2000 and has a capacity of 75. The theatre is managed by the Hoy and Walls drama community.

Some rather incongruous Art Deco structures nearby date from this period. The Arts and Crafts architect William Lethaby rebuilt Melsetter house for mountaineer Thomas Middlemore at the end of the 19th century, leaving untouched the adjacent barn which is probably mid-18th century.

In Poul Anderson's story "The Bitter Bread" the protagonist lives in secluded retirement on Hoy. There is a description of the island: "Steep red and yellow cliffs, sea green in sunlight or gray under clouds until it breaks in whiteness and thunder, gulls riding a cold loud wind, inland the heather and a few gnarly trees across hills where sheep graze, a hamlet of rough and gentle Orkney folk an hour's walk away, my cat, my books, my rememberings."

== Gallery ==
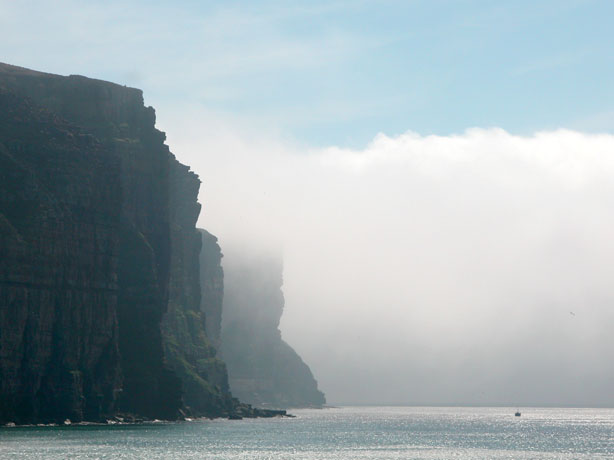
Cliffs on the Atlantic coast of Hoy, south of Rackwick

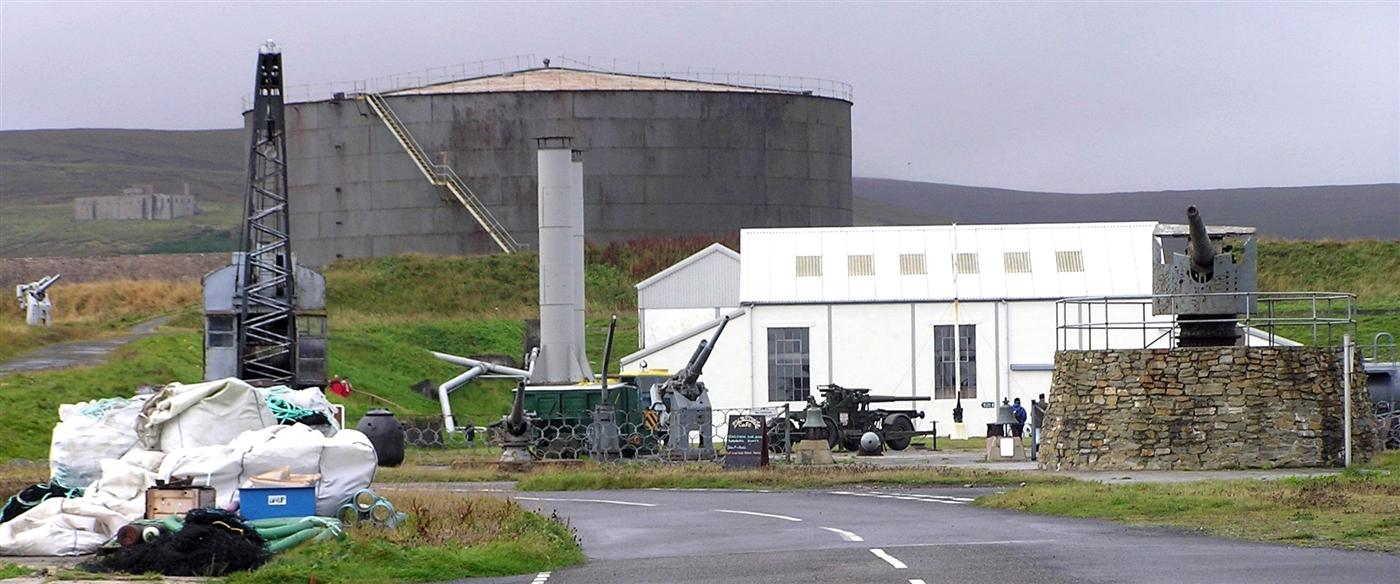
Scapa Flow Visitor Centre

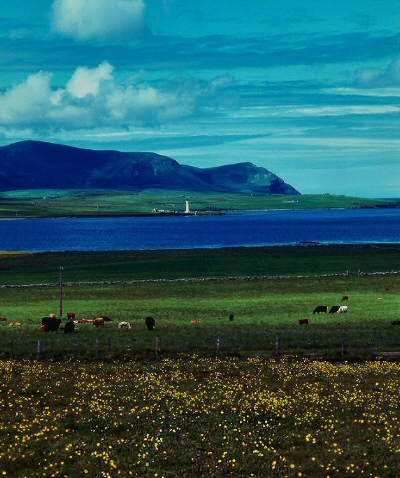
Hoy High Lighthouse on Graemsay, viewed from Mainland

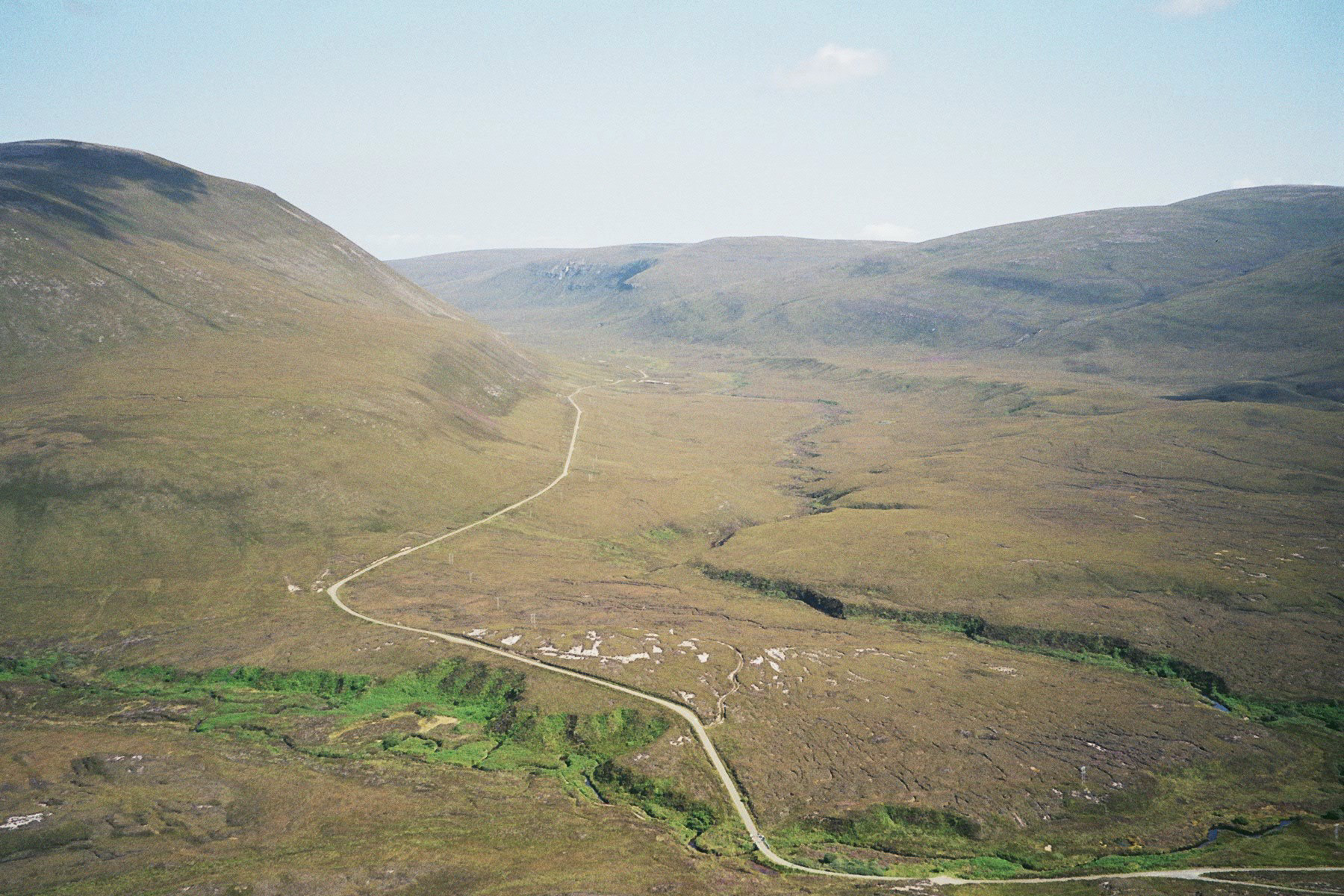
Rackwick Valley

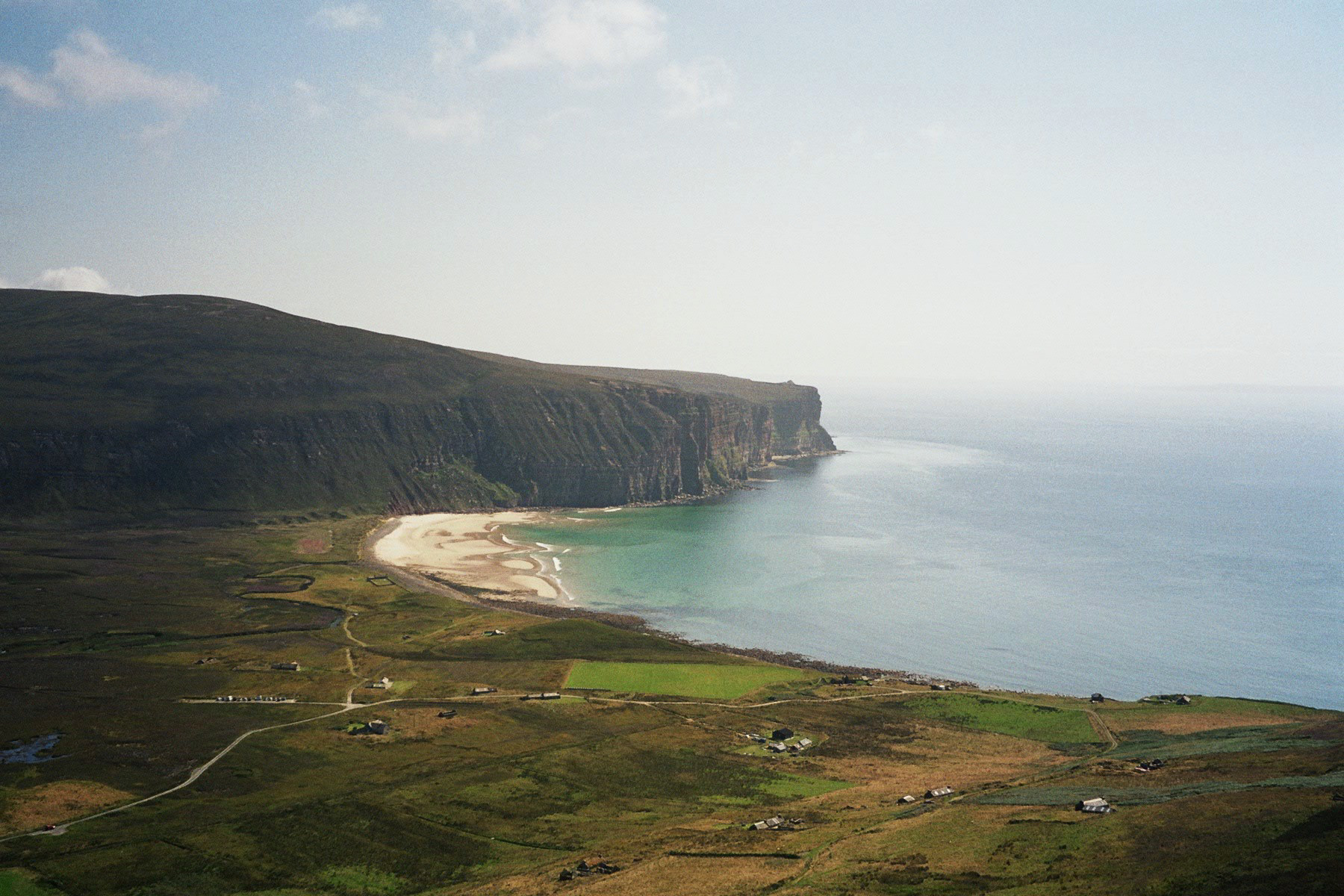
Rackwick

== See also ==
- List of islands of Scotland
