= RNLB Thomas McCunn =

Former lifeboat of the RNLI

Coordinates: 58.7797°N 3.2280°W

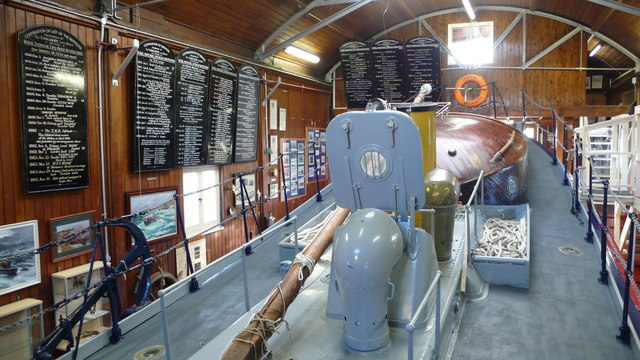
- Thomas McCunn (ON 759)

History

Scotland
- Owner: Royal National Lifeboat Institution (RNLI)
- Builder: Groves & Guttridge, Cowes, Isle of Wight, England
- Official Number: ON 759
- Donor: Supplied by money given to RNLI from the legacy of Mr W McCunn of Largs, Ayrshire, Scotland
- Station: Longhope Lifeboat station, Orkney, Scotland
- Cost: £7120
- Yard number: 182
- Completed: 1932
- Commissioned: 4/1/1933
- Decommissioned: 1972
- In service: 1933
- Fate: Now housed in the Lifeboat shed at Brims where she forms the centrepiece of the museum

General characteristics
- Class & type: 45ft 6in Watson-class
- Type: non-self righting
- Displacement: 18 tons 16 cwt
- Length: 45 ft 6 in (13.87 m) overall
- Beam: 12 ft 4 in (3.76 m)
- Depth: 5 ft 3 in (1.60 m)
- Installed power: Originally 2 Weyburn petrol engines, the last of the petrol engine LBs designed by Watson himself. Re-engined in 1973 with 2 Mermaid diesels.
- Speed: 9 knots (17 km/h)
- Crew: 8
- Notes: On 16 May 1999 The National Historic Ships Committee added the Thomas McCunn to the National Register of Historic Vessels (Certificate no 1515)

RNLB Thomas McCunn (ON 759) is a 45-foot 6in Watson-class lifeboat that was stationed at Longhope in Orkney, Scotland, from January 1933 until April 1962. During this period, she was launched on service 101 times and saved 308 lives.

In 1962, Thomas McCunn was transferred to the RNLI Relief fleet, serving for a further ten years, before being sold in 1972.

The lifeboat was acquired by the Longhope Lifeboat Museum in 2000, where she is now the centrepiece on display at the old lifeboat station at Brims.

== Design and construction ==
Thomas McCunn was designed by lifeboat architect George Lennox Watson, and built at the yard of Groves and Guttridge Ltd. on the Isle of Wight, England, at a cost of £7,120. Her hull is constructed using double diagonal planking of Honduras Mahogany on a framework of Teak ribs and beams with the stem and stern posts and her keel of English oak. The stern and stem posts were grown to the required shape to give the lifeboat its strength and sturdiness.

The Thomas McCunn was 45 feet 6 inches (13.87 m) long and 12 feet 6 inches (3.81 m) wide. The hull is divided into seven watertight compartments, of which the engine room is one. Each engine is itself watertight, and could continue running, even if the engine-room were flooded. The hull is fitted with 142 mahogany air cases, all individually made to fit into its allocated position in the hull. Her equipment included the latest innovations of the time which included a line throwing gun and an electrically powered searchlight.

=== Engines ===
The lifeboat was originally powered by two 40-bhp 4-cylinder 'Weyburn CE4' petrol engines, and could travel 116 miles (187 km) without refuelling, at her top speed of 8.25 knots (15.28 km/h; 9.49 mph). Following her service with the RNLI, she was fitted with two Ford 'Mermaid' diesel engines in 1973, giving a top speed of 9 knots (17 km/h; 10 mph).

== Inauguration ==
Thomas McCunn (RNLI Official Number 759) was the third lifeboat to be funded from the legacy of Mr William McCunn of Largs. The legacy had previously funded Thomas McCunn (ON 575), a 35 ft (11 m) Dungeness-class (Rubie) self-righting 'Pulling and Sailing (P&S) lifeboat, stationed at Port Logan in 1907, and the John Ryburn (ON 565), a 43 ft (13 m) Watson-class lifeboat, the first purpose built motor-powered RNLI lifeboat, first stationed at Stronsay.

She arrived on station at Longhope in January 1933. Just one month later, on 25 February 1933, she rescued 13 crew from the steam trawler Silanion of Grimsby, which had run aground at Tor Ness.

The official service of dedication and naming ceremony took place on 15 August 1933. John M. F. Groat, president of the branch, received the boat, which was then presented to the branch by Lt. Commander T. G. Michelmore, RD, R.N.R., district Inspector of Lifeboats, on behalf of the donor and the Institution. After a service of dedication carried out by The Rev. Gilbert W. Moore, BD, the lifeboat was named Thomas McCunn (ON 759) by Mrs. Alfred Baikie, of Tankerness, wife of the Lord Lieutenant of Orkney and Shetland. At the same ceremony, Mrs Baikie presented a Certificate of Service to the widow of Thomas Gunn, in recognition of his 33-years service as bowman of the Longhope lifeboat.

== Notable service ==
On the morning of 21 February 1936, in gale force conditions, the lifeboat was required to transport a child suffering appendicitis to hospital in Scapa. Due to the conditions, the lifeboat had been unable to be rehoused, and was moored at Longhope Pier. At 19:20 on 21 February 1936, the French trawler Neptunia was spotted, driven ashore at the Tails of Brim, close to the lifeboat house. Now located on the wrong side of The Ayre causeway and South Walls island, the lifeboat was 8 miles (13 km) away by sea.

It would be 21:00 before the lifeboat arrived on scene, to find the vessel parallel with the shore, with no way of getting alongside. Veering down, the lifeboat was backed towards the vessel, and a line was fired across to the vessel. The crew of the Neptunia then launched their ship's boat, which was then pulled back and forth five times between the two vessels. All of the 41 crew were rescued, and were landed at Longhope at 23:15. Coxswain William Dass was awarded the RNLI Bronze Medal, with further medals awarded to the coxswain and crew by the French government.

Thomas McCunn was launched at 01:40 on 12 April 1951, to the Oil tanker Oljaren of Gothenburg, which had run aground on Muckle Skerry in gale force conditions. However, with the crew of 40 refusing to leave the vessel, the lifeboat stood by in difficult and rough conditions for nearly 11 hours, until the Captain finally gave the order to abandon ship at 13:00. Even then, only 24 men left the vessel, and the rescued men were landed at Longhope at 15:30. At 17:45, the Captain again called for assistance, but after putting to sea again, still none of the 16 remaining men would leave the vessel, and the lifeboat returned to Longhope at 23.30. Finally, at 14:35 the following day, the owners of the vessel instructed the Captain to abandon ship. The lifeboat launched for the third time at 14:45, landing the remaining 16 men at Longhope at 17:45. For his skill and determination during this drawn out service, Coxswain Alfred Johnston was awarded the RNLI Bronze Medal.

Both the Longhope and Wick lifeboats were launched in the early hours of 3 February 1956, to the freighter Dovrefjell of Oslo, which had run ashore on the Pentland Skerries. With violent seas breaking over the vessel, it was impossible to get close, so both lifeboats stood by, until all 41 crew were rescued by Naval and RAF helicopters, with the Longhope lifeboat finally returning home at 15:00. Daniel Kirkpatrick, who had been appointed as Longhope coxswain in 1954, received the Norwegian Medal for Heroism, awarded by The King of Norway.

Kirkpatrick would receive the RNLI Silver Medal for a service on 4 February 1959. The trawler Strathcoe of Aberdeen ran ashore on the west coast of Hoy. Thomas McCunn was launched at 03:27, with the Stromness Barnett-class lifeboat Archibald and Alexander M. Patterson (ON 924) also called. Arriving on scene, Kirkpatrick ordered that the anchor be dropped, and the lifeboat veered down close enough for a line to be made to the vessel, to set up a Breeches buoy. However, as the first man was being hauled across at 06:20, he was washed from the buoy, fortunately being able to haul himself along the line to the lifeboat. It was decided to wait for better conditions, and at 07:45, the rescue continued. All 13 fishermen were retrieved by 08:09, and were landed at Longhope at 10:22.

One of the last services of Thomas McCunn at Longhope did not have a good outcome. The lifeboat was launched into terrible conditions at 00:10 on 7 December 1959, to the aid of the trawler George Robb, which was reported to be taking on water, and in urgent need of assistance. The lifeboat was driven at full speed into mountainous seas, with an ESE gale blowing against the flood-tide, with the pounding eventually causing the radio to fail. Visibility was so poor, that the 20-mile sweep of the light from Duncansby Head could only be seen five miles from shore. Reaching the eastern end of the Pentland Firth, the lifeboat was knocked over onto its beam ends. With winds now increasing to hurricane force, and with no sign or evidence of the trawler or survivors, the lifeboat headed back for Longhope, arriving at 06:00. There it was reported that radio contact with the trawler had been lost, and was now presumed sunk, with the loss of the 13 crew, and that they had been trying to recall the lifeboat for two hours. Coxswain Daniel Kirkpatrick was accorded 'The Thanks of the Institution inscribed on Vellum', with the crew receiving Vellum Service Certificates.

== 1962 onwards ==
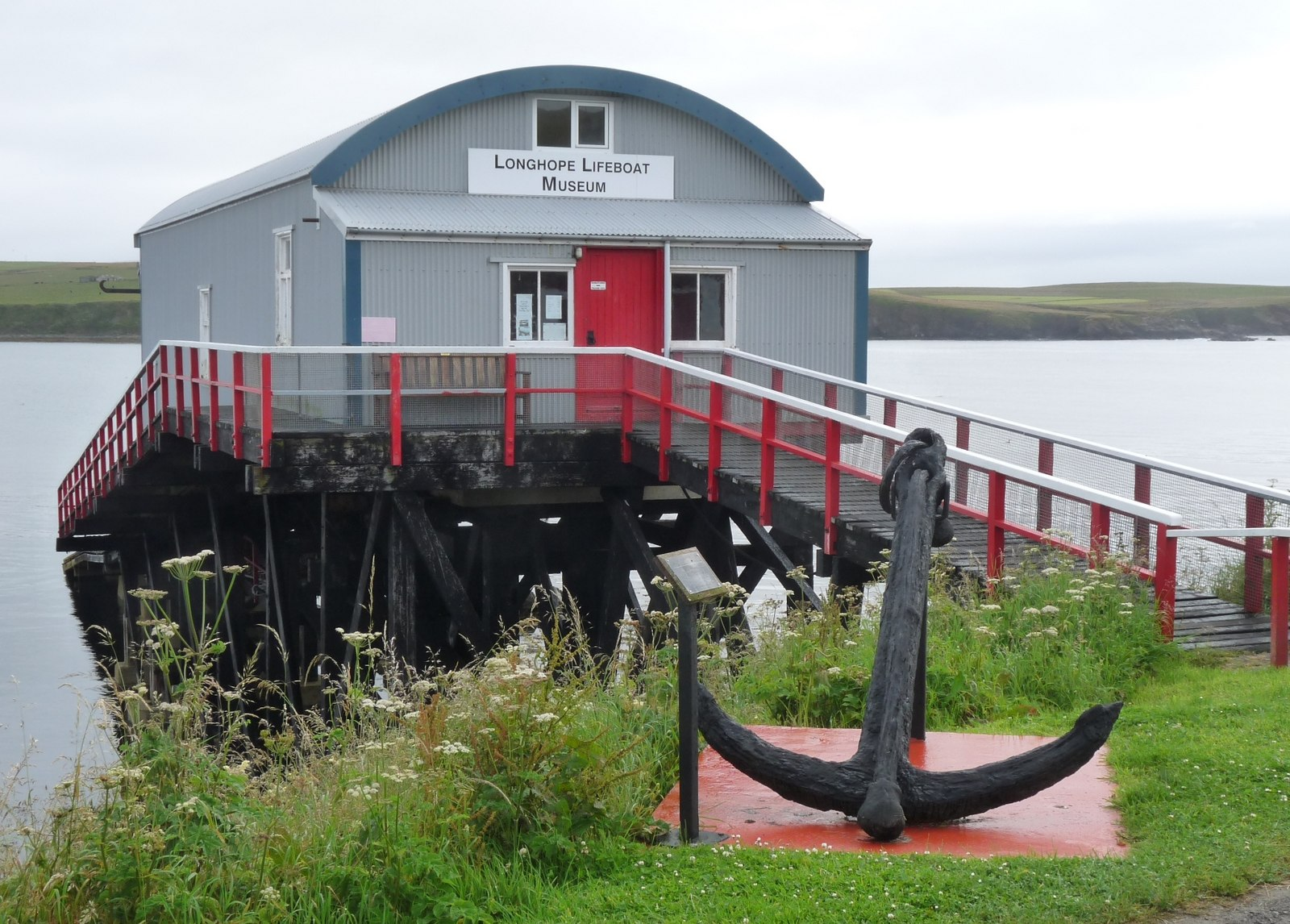
Former Longhope lifeboat station, now museum

During her time at Longhope, Thomas McCunn was launched 101 times and saved 308 lives. In 1962, the lifeboat was transferred to the RNLI relief fleet, recording eight launches over the next 10 years, with seven lives saved. The boat was sold to Mr Peter Speir in 1972, who carried out an extensive refit, and renamed the boat Pentland Speir. It was later sold to Mr Peter Roberts, who in turn sold her to the Longhope Lifeboat Museum in 2000, for the sum of £1. Still seaworthy, she is still launched on special occasions.

Coxswain Daniel Kirkpatrick would come to earn the RNLI Silver Medal on two further occasions, but was lost, along with several crew members who had served on the Thomas McCunn, when the successor Longhope lifeboat T. G. B. (ON 962) capsized on 17 March 1969.

== Honours ==
The following are awards made to crew of the Thomas McCunn (ON 759):

- RNLI Silver Medal
  Daniel Kirkpatrick, Coxswain – 1959
- James Michael Bower Endowment Fund, awarded by the Peninsular and Oriental Steam Navigation Company, to those who receive either the Gold or Silver Medal of the RNLI for gallantry.
  Daniel Kirkpatrick, Coxswain – 1959
- RNLI Bronze Medal
  William Dass, Coxswain – 1936
  Alfred Johnston, Coxswain – 1951
- 'The Thanks of the Institution inscribed on Vellum'
  James Johnston, Bowman – 1959
  Robert Johnston, Motor Mechanic – 1959
  Robert Rattray Johnston, Asst. Mechanic – 1959
  Daniel Kirkpatrick, Coxswain – 1960
- Medal Service Certificates
  James Nicholson, crew member – 1959
  Daniel Raymond Kirkpatrick, crew member – 1959
  Robert Johnston, crew member – 1959

=== Foreign awards ===
- Silver Medal, awarded by the French Government
  William Dass, Coxswain – 1936
- Bronze Medal, awarded by the French Government
  Longhope Lifeboat Crew – 1936
- Norwegian Medal for Heroism, awarded by The King of Norway
  Daniel Kirkpatrick, Coxswain – 1956

== Service record ==
Year	Date	Vessel	Home Port	Service	Notes
1933	25 February	Steam trawler Silanion	Grimsby	Rescued 13	
1933	19 November	Steam trawler Geysir	Reykjavik	Rescued 18	
1934	23 March	SS Cairn Glen	Newcastle-upon-Tyne	Stood By	
1935	20 August	MV Gunnaren	Gothenburg	Rescued 26	
1935	23 August	MV Gunnaren	Gothenburg	Rescued 20	Salvage operation
1936	21 February	–	–	Patient transport to Scarpa	
1936	21 February	Steam Trawler Neptunia	Le Havre	Rescued 41	Awards
1936	29 March	–	–	Patient transport to Scarpa	
1936	1 July	Steam Trawler New Choice	Granton	Assisted to save vessel	
1938	29 September	Steam Trawler Worsley	Grimsby	Rescued 9	
1939	7 September	Steam Trawler Commander Nasmith	Kingston-upon-Hull	Stood by	
1940	12 September	Salvage vessel Salvage King	–	Transferred 35 to a Tug	
1941	24 September	MV Runda	Norway	Saved Boat and rescued 10	
1942	12 January	SS Empire Parsons	–	Stood by	
1944	5 August	SS Charles D. McIver	–	Stood by	
1944	6 August	SS Charles D. McIver	–	Saved vessel and rescued 76	
1944	9 August	Fishing trawler Blethos	Aberdeen	Stood by	
1945	13 January	H.S.L. (Royal Navy)	Wick	Stood by	
1945	21 June	SS Fort La Prairie	London	Rescued 52	
1945	24 June	HMS Ringdove	–	Stood by	
1947	24 August	SS Gundine	Arendal	Stood by	
1949	3 March	Fishing boat Mazurka	Peterhead	Saved boat and rescued 7	
1949	1 July	Fishing boat Saltness	–	Saved boat and rescued 1	
1949	24 August	Fishing trawler St Clair	Grimsby	Landed 13	
1950	6 January	–	–	Patient transport to Kirkwall	
1951	3 March	Trawler Lotos	Aberdeen	Escorted vessel	
1951	12 April	Motor tanker Oljaren	Gothenburg	Rescued 24	
1951	13 April	Motor tanker Oljaren	Gothenburg	Rescued 16	Awards
1951	1 June	Fishing vessel Harvest Hope	Lerwick	Stood by	
1951	19 October	Fishing boat Blenheim	–	Gave help	
1953	17 June	SS Rutgers Victory	Los Angeles	Gave help	
1954	2 July	–	–	Patient transport to Kirkwall	
1955	11 April	Steam trawler Gava	Aberdeen	Saved vessel and rescued 4	
1955	21 May	Motor yawl Shirma	Longhope	Gave help	
1956	3 February	Freighter Dovrefjell	Oslo	Stood by	Awards
1956	26 July	–	–	Rescued 1	Bird watcher Harold Duchrow stranded on Switha
1957	31 January	Fishing yawl Sylvia	Kirkwall	Saved boat and rescued 3	
1957	9 March	Lifeboat of trawler Northern Wave	–	Saved boat	
1957	4 July	Trawler Girdleness	Aberdeen	Gave help	
1957	5 July	Trawler Girdleness	Aberdeen	Stood by	
1959	4 February	Trawler Strathcoe	Granton	Rescued 14	Awards
1959	7 December	Trawler George Robb	Aberdeen	Vessel not found	Not recorded on service board. Awards.
1960	26 March	Trawler Little Ouse	–	Escorted vessel	
1960	9 June	Trawler Adolphe Hennecke	Rostock	Gave help	
1960	1 November	–	–	Patient transport to Orkney mainland	
1960	10 November	Fishing yawl Delightful	–	Escorted boat	
