= Longhope, Orkney =

Coordinates: 58.798°N 3.201°W

Longhope
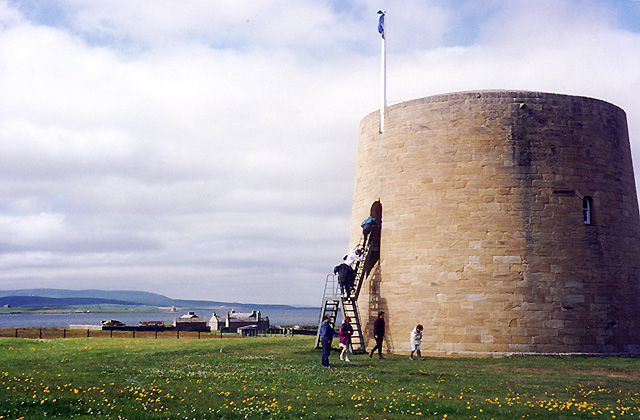
- Hackness Martello Tower and Battery, one of a pair on each side of Longhope, built in 1814

- Location within Orkney
- OS grid reference: ND302907
- Civil parish: Walls and Flotta
- Council area: Orkney
- Lieutenancy area: Orkney
- Country: Scotland
- Sovereign state: United Kingdom
- Post town: STROMNESS
- Postcode district: KW16
- Dialling code: 01856
- Police: Scotland
- Fire: Scottish
- Ambulance: Scottish
- UK Parliament: Orkney and Shetland
- Scottish Parliament: Orkney

Longhope is a coastal settlement on the island of South Walls, in Orkney, Scotland. South Walls is linked to Hoy by causeway; Longhope is the largest settlement on the two islands. The settlement is situated on the B9047, the main road on Hoy and South Walls.

== History ==
A coastal artillery battery, Hackness Gun Battery, was established near Longhope at ND338912 to defend gathering Baltic convoys from enemy attack. Excavation undertaken by Headland Archaeology proved that this battery had undergone two stages of development. It was built between 1813 and 1815 in response to a perceived threat from American privateers. On recommendations made by the Admiralty the base was constructed alongside one of only three martello towers in Scotland; the others being across the bay from Hackness at Crockness and the Tally Toor in Leith. Eight 24-pounder guns were placed in the original battery, but were replaced in 1866 with four 68-pounder guns as part of an overhaul. This remodelling was in response to a perceived threat from Fenians based in America. No guns were ever fired in anger from the battery and the excavated remains have been left for public display.

=== Lifeboats ===
An RNLI lifeboat has been stationed at Longhope since 1874; the old lifeboat house is now a museum with a former Longhope lifeboat Thomas McCunn on display. On 17 March 1969 the station suffered one of the worst tragedies in British lifeboat history when its 47-ft wooden lifeboat, T.G.B., capsized with the loss of all eight crew after answering a mayday call from the Liberian cargo vessel Irene during a gale of Force 9. An unusually high wave, in what were described in the enquiry as "maelstrom conditions", is considered to have caused the capsize. Boats capable of righting themselves were subsequently introduced. The T.G.B. itself was salvaged, repaired and re-allocated to another station. It is now on display at the Scottish Maritime Museum. In total, as of 2004, the station has received 26 bravery honours.

== See also ==
- Longhope Lifeboat Thomas McCunn ON 759
