= South Walls =

Island of the Orkney Islands, Scotland

Sooth Waas (Scots)
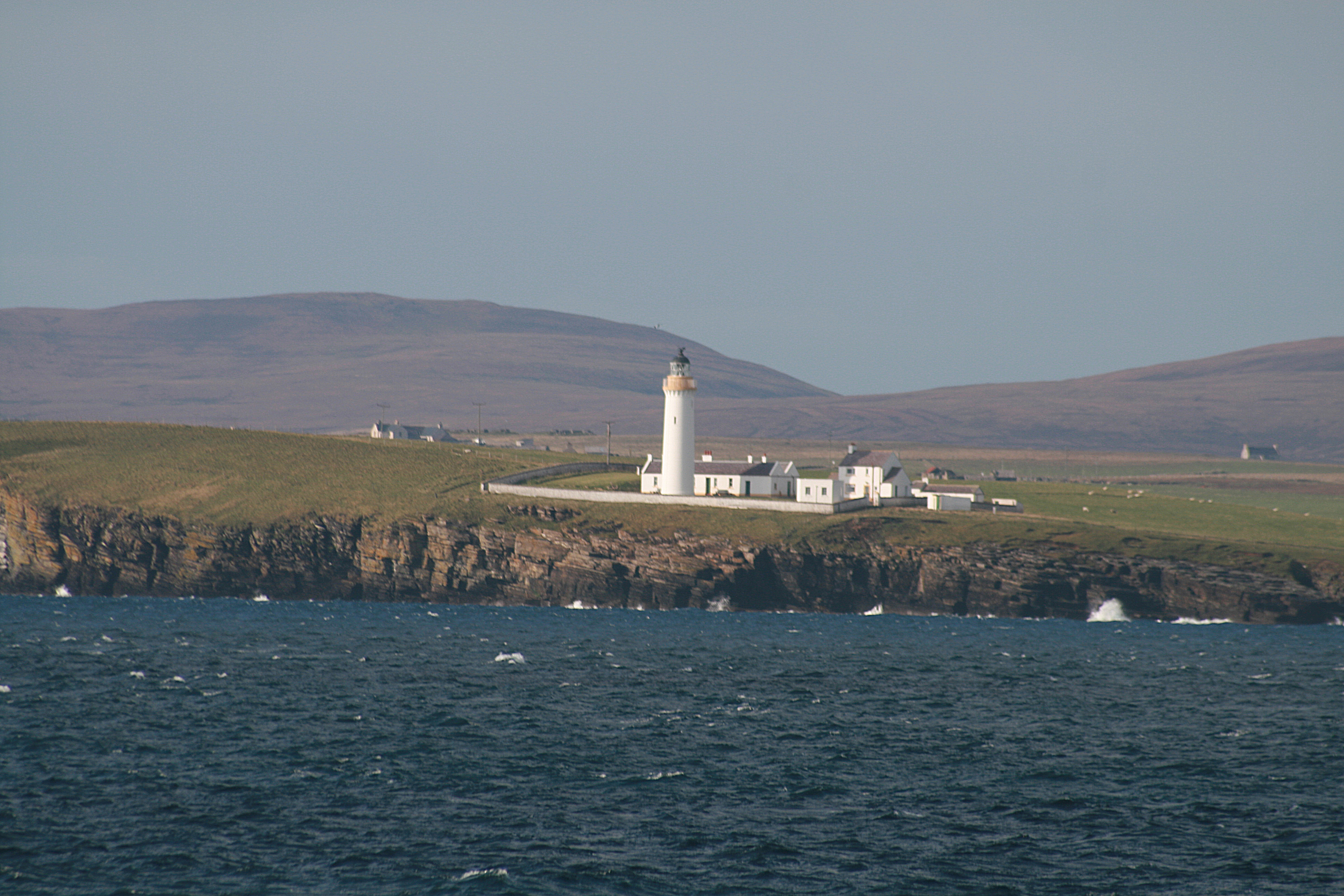
- Cantick Head lighthouse on South Walls

Location
- South Walls shown within Orkney
- OS grid reference: ND304895
- Coordinates: 58.78788°N 3.2049°W

Name
- Old Norse name: Vágaland/Vágar

Physical geography
- Island group: Orkney
- Area: 1,100 ha (4.2 sq mi)
- Area rank: 47
- Highest elevation: 57 m (187 ft)

Administration
- Council area: Orkney Islands
- Country: Scotland
- Sovereign state: United Kingdom

South Walls, often referred to as Walls, is an island in Orkney, Scotland. It is connected to the island of Hoy, and to the district of North Walls, by a causeway known as The Ayre. Its largest settlement is Longhope, which lies on a long natural harbour of the same name. Both North and South Walls belong to the civil parish of Walls and Flotta.

South Walls is a popular stopping off place for barnacle geese.

== Etymology ==
The Norse name of Vágaland, meaning "land of bays" applied to both what is now South Walls and the southern portion of nearby Hoy. Over time this became Scots: Wais (variously spelled) for the whole area and Scots: Sooth Waas meaning "southern bays" for the island. As for Kirkwall, early cartographers assumed "waa" was a local pronunciation of "wall", hence the modern name.

== Geography and geology ==
South Walls, like most of the Orkney archipelago, is made up of old red sandstone, with the Rousay flagstone group predominating. It is more or less oval in shape, although there is a small promontory called Cantick Head in the southeast, overlooking Kirk Hope. It is separated from Hoy by the inlet of Longhope. The body of water south of the Ayre is known as Aith Hope.

Although it is clear that South Walls is inhabited as it was not listed as an inhabited island by the census no reliable estimate of the current population is available.

=== Status as an island or peninsula ===
In the past various descriptions suggest that South Walls was usually considered to be an island.

- Fordun's 14th century Chronica Gentis Scotorum has an enumeration of the Orkney islands including "Wawys".
- In Jo Ben's 1529 "Descriptions of Orkney", Wais appears in a list of islands but the wording states: "the island is not large. There is no distinction between Hoy and Wais, but it is one island from the firth receding" i.e. at low tide.
- Irvine's 2006 reprint of Blaeu's Atlas Novus of 1654 contains various descriptions of Orkney including:-
  - "the island of Walls, (commonly Waes);
  - "among them Hoy Walls, whether this is two islands, or one: because about the season of equal day, when the tides goes out, they are joined with waves and sand at a narrow neck as one island; when the tide comes in and the sea is again interposed, the appearance of two lands surrounded by water is produced."
  - "Hoy and Walls which some call two islands, others one: because about the equinoxes, (when the seas are most violently stirred up and boil), when the tide goes out and the sands are bared, they are joined by a narrow strip and make one island; when the tide tide comes and the sea is again interposed they give the appearance of two islands".

The Vision of Britain map of 1856 shows a drying gap between the islands of Hoy and South Walls.

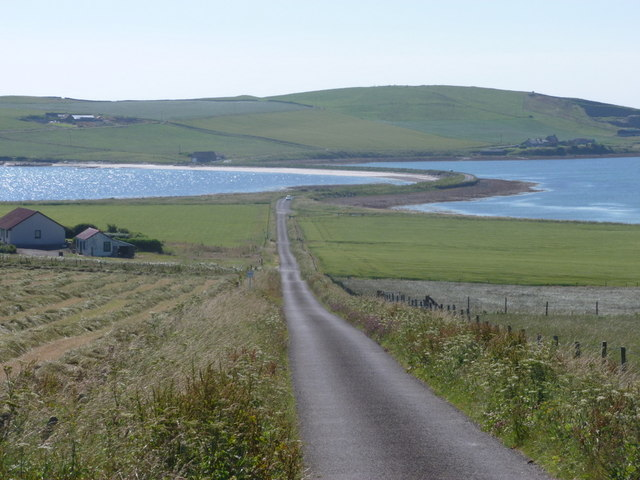
The Ayre, with North Walls beyond

A road linking South Walls to Hoy was constructed in 1912. Prior to that time it had only been accessible by land across the shingle beach of the Ayre at low tide. Its status is now considered by some writers as a peninsula attached to Hoy and by others as still being an island. Some examples are given below.

Neither the 2001 or 2011 censuses mention South Walls in their lists of inhabited islands. In 2001 the General Register Office for Scotland defined an island as "a mass of land surrounded by water, separate from the Scottish mainland" and although the inclusion of islands linked man-made constructions is not clear from this definition in practice they list several separately that are joined to one another by bridges and causeways such as South Ronaldsay in Orkney or are tidal islands such as Eilean Shona and Erraid in the Hebrides.

South Walls is listed in Livingstone's comprehensive Scottish island tables but the Gazetteer for Scotland states that it is "a peninsula, sometimes described as an island." Haswell-Smith states that South Walls "was an island" until the causeway over the Ayre was constructed. For similar reasons he excludes Skye amongst others that are considered by others as having island status.

== History ==
=== Norse period ===
South Walls features fairly prominently in the Norse period, partly because it was the first landfall when sailing from west Caithness or Sutherland. It and North Walls were known to the Norsemen as Vágaland, the land of voes or bays.

South Walls also played a crucial role in the Christianisation of Orkney. Although Christianity in the islands predated the Norse by a number of years, the Norse often remained pagan. Olaf Tryggvasson, King of Norway forced the Earl of Orkney, Sigurd Hloðvisson to be baptised at South Walls. Earl Sigurd accepted, and remained a nominal Christian the rest of his life. However, he did so under duress - King Olaf had many valas (Norse shamans) executed by being tied and left on a skerry at ebb. This was a long and terrible wait for death, and perhaps Earl Sigurd expected a similar fate.

=== 17th century ===
Walter Stewart's "Chorographic Description" of Orkney and Shetland says of South Walls:

Its south coast is gnawed at as if by a rabid dog by the Pentland Firth; its waves like so many teeth are strongly resisted by the very high and hard cliffs which stretch out before this island, and blunt the bite. It enjoys from and in itself quite a good production of crops, pastures, fish sea- and land-birds, and ponies. There are very many buildings on it and very many spirited inhabitants, in particular a dwelling called Snelsetter to the south, and one called Melsetter to the west. It also has an anchorage for ships not far from Snelsetter, quite commodious.

=== Modern history ===
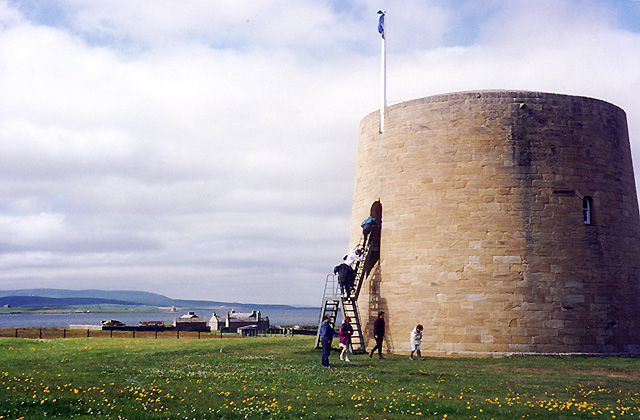
Hackness martello tower, one of a pair on either side of Longhope bay, built in 1813-14

Overlooking Longhope in the north east is Hackness Martello Tower and Battery. The tower, together with another on the north side at Crockness on Hoy, was built in 1815 to protect British ships in the bay of Longhope against attack by American and French privateers, during the Napoleonic Wars, while they waited for a Royal Navy escort on their journey to Baltic ports. The towers were rearmed for World War I. Hackness Martello Tower and Battery is in the care of Historic Environment Scotland.

Cantick Head is well known for its lighthouse designed and built by David and Thomas Stevenson and first lit in July 1858 and automated in 1991. In 1912, the Ayre causeway was built between Hoy and South Walls, permanently connecting the two islands.

South Walls has substantial remains from the Second World War, when Scapa Flow was used as a Royal Navy base.

=== Longhope lifeboat ===
A lifeboat has been stationed on Hoy since 1874, at first housed in a prominent stone building close to the west end of the causeway that links the two islands of Hoy and South Walls. In 2000 an Arun-class lifeboat, Sir Max Aitken II became the Longhope lifeboat. This class was designed to stay permanently afloat, and the decision was taken to move her to purpose-built moorings at Longhope pier. The lifeboats that have served here since have also been stationed at Longhope, including the current vessel the Helen Comrie (a Tamar-class lifeboat) and her predecessor The Queen Mother, which was based here between 2004 and 2006. A station has been built where the lifeboat is moored at Longhope which is also the main harbour for boats to and from the island.

== Natural history ==
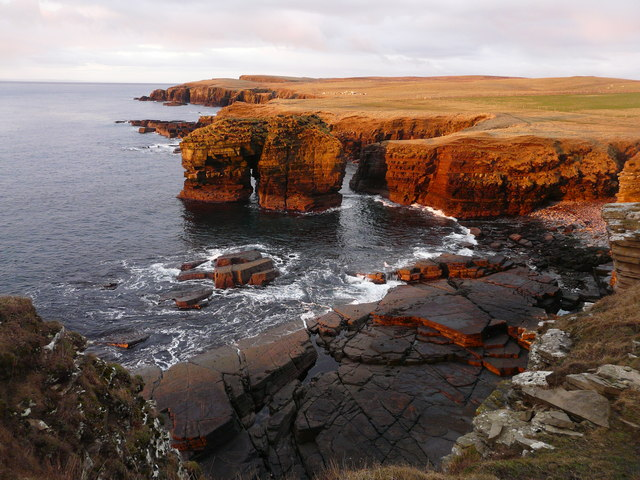
The Candle stack and cliffs within the Hill of White Hamars nature reserve

Barnacle geese regularly over-winter on South Walls with numbers often exceeding 1500. Many species of seabirds nest on the cliffs including razorbills, fulmar and guillemots. Butterflies such as meadow browns and common blues can be seen in the summer. The Scottish primrose can be found at the Scottish Wildlife Trust nature reserve at Hill of White Hamars on the south coast.

== Gallery ==
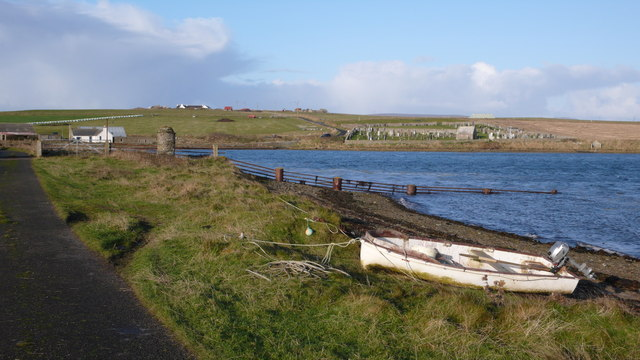
Kirk Hope

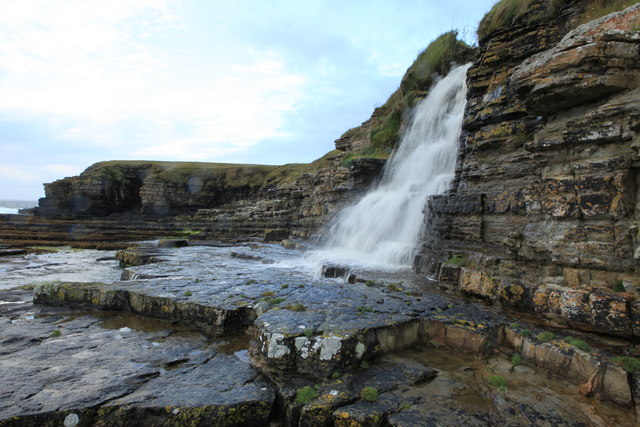
Waterfall entering the sea at Misbister

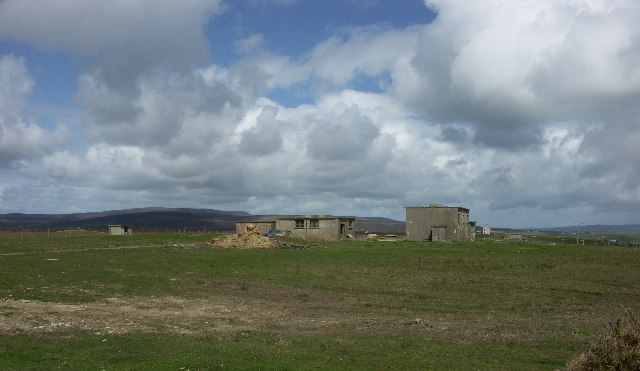
Remains of a WWII-era radio station
