= Nevi Skerry =

Rock formation in Orkney Islands, Scotland

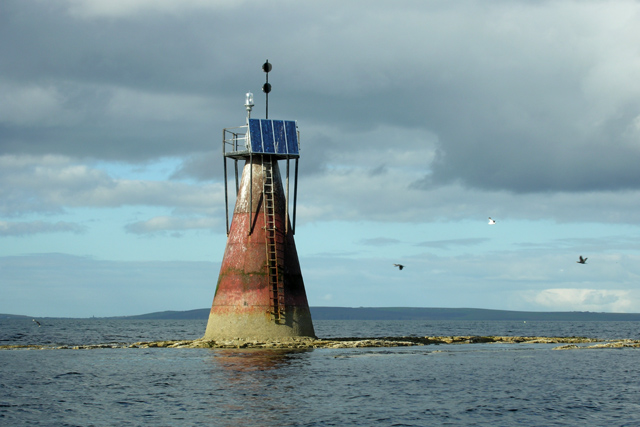
- The navigation light on Nevi Skerry

Location
- Nevi Skerry shown within Orkney
- OS grid reference: ND397957
- Coordinates: 58.85°N 3.03°W

Physical geography
- Island group: Orkney

Administration
- Council area: Orkney Islands
- Country: Scotland
- Sovereign state: United Kingdom

Demographics
- Population: 0

Nevi Skerry is a skerry situated in Scapa Flow in the Orkney Islands. The skerry is situated approximately 1 km (0.62 mi) east of Flotta and approximately 2 km (1.2 mi) north-west of South Ronaldsay, at the northern end of the Sound of Hoxa.

The schooner, Magnet, was wrecked on Nevi Skerry on 14 March 1847.
