= Flotta =

Island in Orkney, Scotland

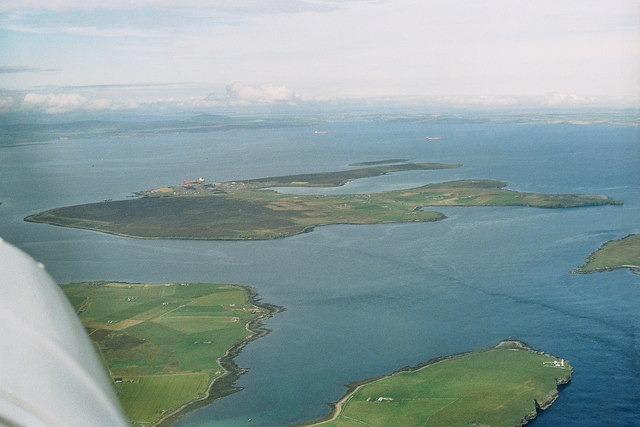
- An aerial view of Flotta from the south-west. The oil terminal is visible to the centre-left, with the airport further to the left. South Walls is at the bottom and bottom left, and Switha at the extreme right.

Location
- Flotta shown within Orkney
- OS grid reference: ND352938
- Coordinates: 58.83°N 3.1°W

Name
- Name meaning: "flat island" (Norse)
- Old Norse name: Flottey or Flott-øy

Physical geography
- Island group: Orkney
- Area: 876 hectares (3.4 sq mi)
- Area rank: 57
- Highest elevation: West Hill 58 metres (190 ft)

Administration
- Council area: Orkney Islands
- Country: Scotland
- Sovereign state: United Kingdom

Demographics
- Population: 77
- Population rank: 49
- Population density: 8.8 people/km^{2}
- Largest settlement: Whome

Flotta (/ˈflɒtə/) is a small island in Orkney, Scotland, lying in Scapa Flow. The island is known for its large oil terminal and is linked by Orkney Ferries to Houton on the Orkney Mainland, Lyness on Hoy and Longhope on South Walls. The island has a population of about 80.

== History ==
At the turn of the 20th century, the island was a quiet rural community like many other small islands of Orkney, but its sheltered location led to three major upheavals on the island in the century.

Until 1914, Flotta was a quiet farming community. In 1910, a population of 431 included two blacksmiths, four carpenters and three dressmakers.

=== Neolithic ===
The presence of a Burnt mound, a cairn and a tumulus indicates Neolithic inhabitation of the island, however any other traces were likely destroyed by periodic plowing of the fields on the island.

=== World Wars ===
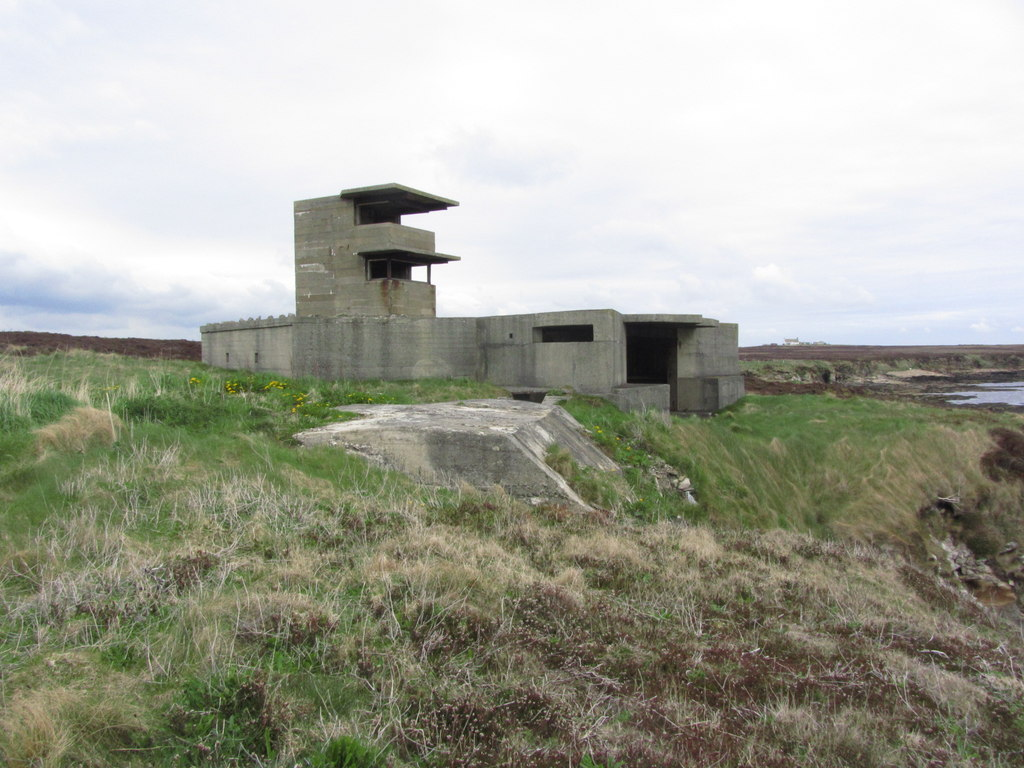
The Buchanan Battery on Flotta

Everything changed with the arrival of the Royal Navy in Scapa Flow at the start of the First World War. There is a photograph held by the Imperial War Museum in London that shows a boxing match taking place on Flotta in front of a wartime audience of 10,000 people.

Four Coastal defence batteries were constructed throughout both world wars at Innan Neb, Stanger Head, Buchanan and Roan Head.

During the First World War, the island was home to a naval base. The dreadnought HMS Vanguard sank nearby in 1917, reputedly the worst maritime disaster in UK waters. In the Second World War, the island was again used as a military base.

1918 saw the mass exodus of Navy personnel, and 1939 saw their return. After the Second World War the island had good piers and facilities, but a slowly declining population. It took until 1970 for fresh water to be piped to the island from Hoy.

=== North Sea oil ===
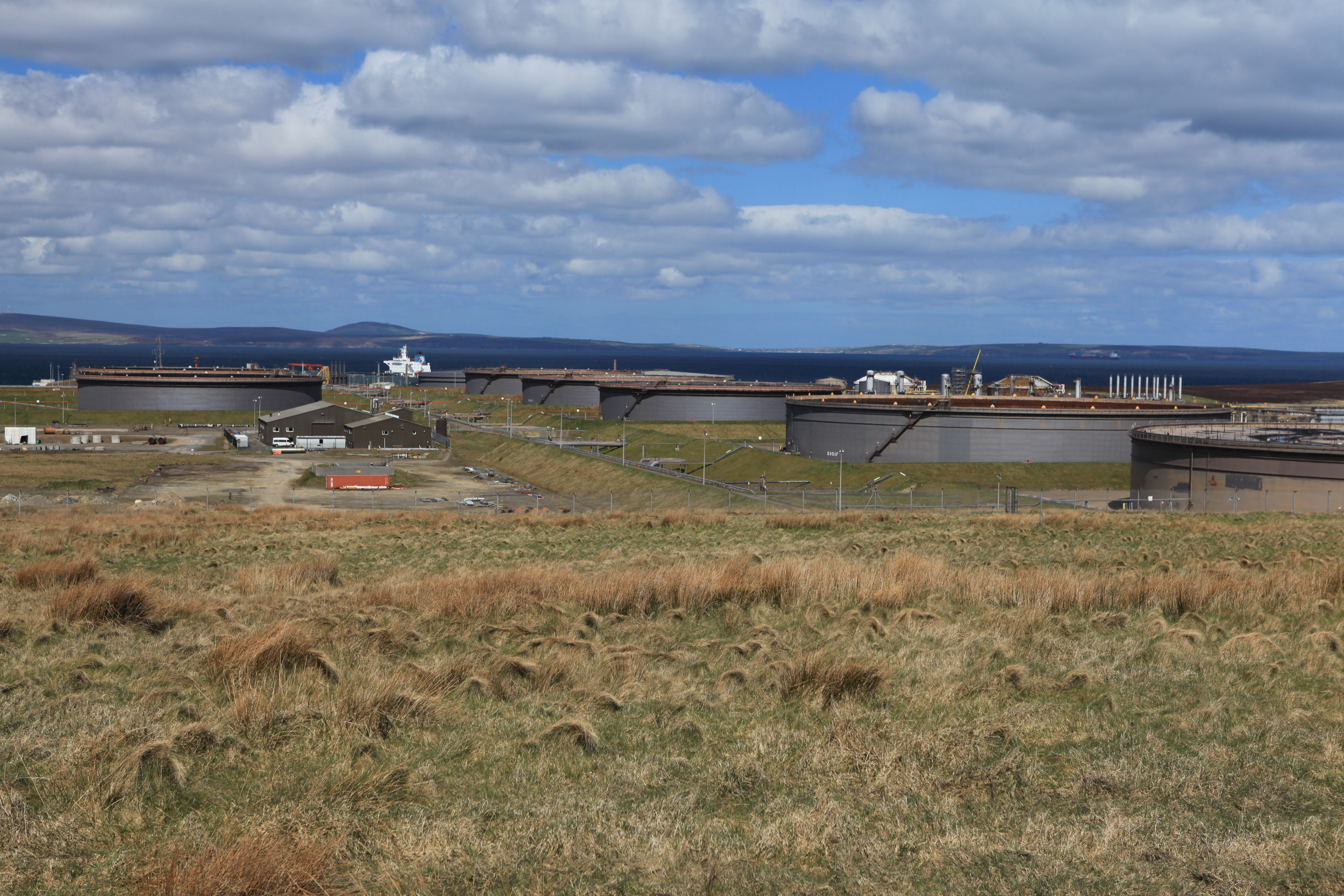
Flotta oil terminal

In 1974, Occidental Petroleum started construction of the island's oil terminal. This became the largest major oil terminal serving the UK North Sea, until Sullom Voe oil terminal in Shetland opened in 1978.

It took only two years from the start of construction until the first of the crude oil was pumped into the terminal, during which thousands of workers were posted at the "camp" in Flotta to complete the facility as Britain's thirst for oil was growing by the day. The Flotta oil terminal was opened by the energy minister, Tony Benn MP, on 11 January 1977.

The oil terminal provides the landing for the Piper and Claymore fields pipeline system. In addition, it provides a safe facility for the receipt and transshipment of oil produced from the UK Atlantic margins.

== Geography and environment ==
Flotta lies at the southern end of Scapa Flow, with Calf of Flotta being at the north-east corner of the island. The island of Fara is 300 m (980 ft) across Weddel Sound, to the north-west. Meanwhile, Switha, South Walls and Hoy are each approximately 1 km (0.62 mi) from Flotta, to the south, south-west and west, respectively. Nevi Skerry is situated 1 km (0.62 mi) east of Flotta in the Sound of Hoxa. South Ronaldsay is approximately 2.5 km (1.6 mi) east of Flotta, also across the sound of Hoxa. The highest point on Flotta is West Hill at 58 m (190 ft), adjacent to the wind turbine. The main population centre is at Whome, which is situated in the centre of the southern half of the island. To the north, Whome is separated from the Golta Peninsula by Pan Hope, a tidal bay.

=== Flora and fauna ===
Flotta has a seal colony at Stanger Head, at the south-east corner of the island. The Royal Navy planted 1000 spruce trees during the Second World War, which are situated between Sutherland Pier and the oil terminal, in the vicinity of the Naval Cinema. About 10% of the spruce trees survive. The oil company has also planted 40,000 trees and shrubs. Much of the western side of the island is heath, as is the Golta Peninsula to the north-east of the island.

== Community ==
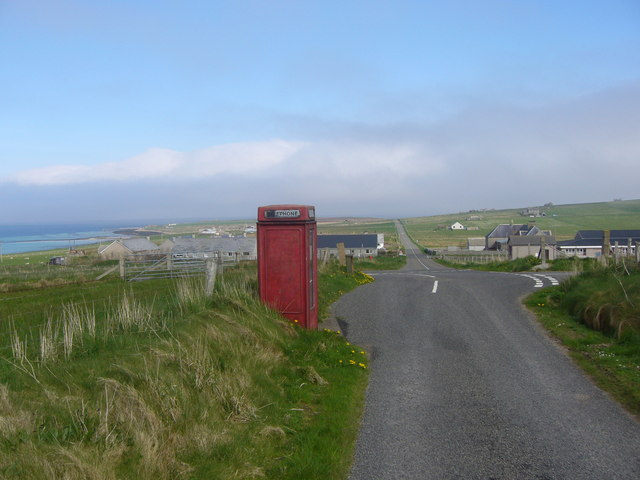
The settlement of Whome on Flotta

The island had a usually resident population of 77 in 2022. The main centre of population is in the settlement of Whome. The community primary school is mothballed due to there being no children of that age left on the island.

Healthcare services are provided by the Stromness Surgery, with a nurse practitioner based on Flotta. Flotta Fire Station, which is situated next to the school, formally closed on 25 October 2012. The service provided by the fire station was transferred to the Scottish Fire and Rescue Service on 1 April 2013.

The 2.3MW wind turbine, which was installed in 2010, will provide the community with a cash contribution of £100,000 over the lifetime of the turbine.

== Economy ==
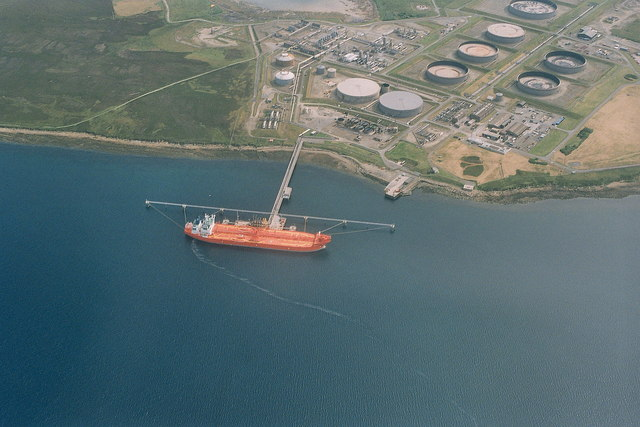
An aerial view of Flotta oil terminal in 2007

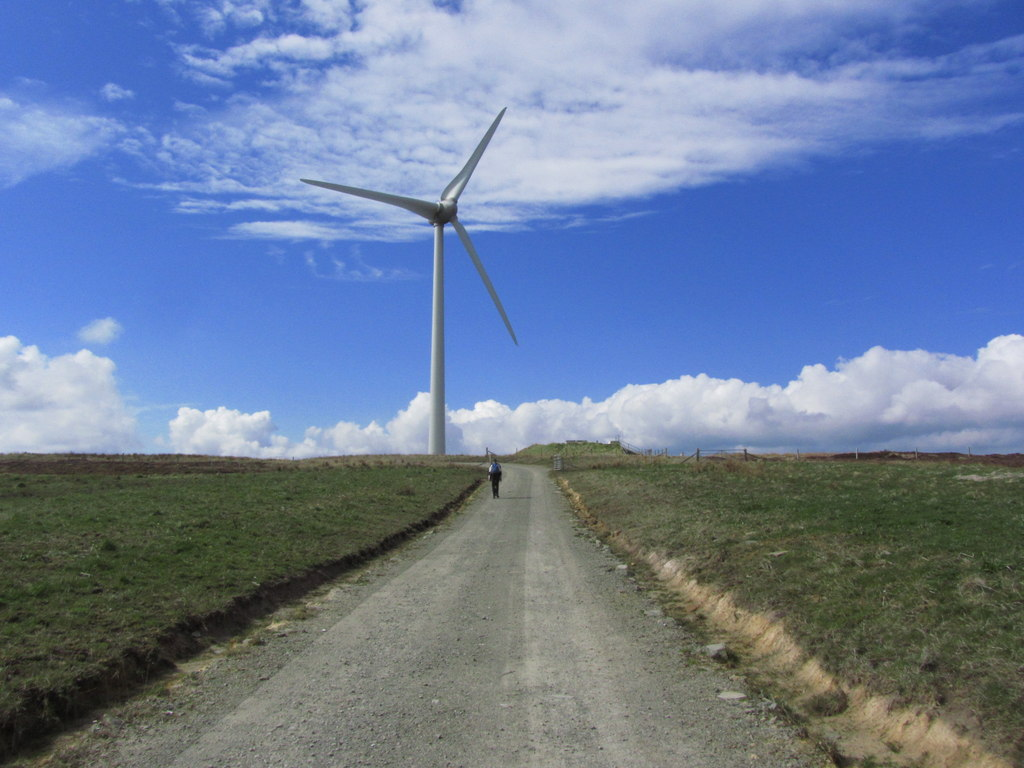
The wind turbine on West Hill

The main industry on the island is energy production and distribution. Repsol Sinopec Energy UK Limited's Flotta oil terminal, processes oil from the North Sea for onward transfer. The oil terminal has been operational for 36 years. Opus Plus Ltd., an environmental research company, is also based within the oil terminal complex. Supplied by German manufacturer Enercon, the 2.3MW Flotta wind turbine was brought online in June 2010 at a cost of £3 million. The turbine, which is connected to the National Grid, has a hub height of 64 m (210 ft) and a rotor diameter of 71 m (233 ft).

The Orkney Island Council provides employment to several people on Flotta. Farming remains an important source of revenue for the island economy, along with handicraft. A small number of residents are also employed on the Orkney Mainland.

The island is served by one shop, which operates as a general store, a post office and a petrol station. The nearest supermarkets are situated in Kirkwall, on the Orkney Mainland, which has branches of Tesco and Lidl.

The island has a mains water supply, and boreholes are also used. Flotta didn't have a mains electricity supply until 1977, although most households had had their own electricity generators for many years beforehand. Mains electricity is supplied by Scottish Hydro Electric. The island is connected to the BT telephone network. Mobile phone connections can be an issue. Broadband internet connection is possible on the island. There is no mains gas supply on Flotta, although coal and heating oil are delivered regularly, and Calor Gas is stored at the shop.

In 2005, Flotta was considered to have the potential of expanding the island economy with heritage tourism, and with a particular regard for the Second World War-era structures which are spread across the island. The possible development of a marina was also considered, at that time.

== Transport ==
=== Marine ===
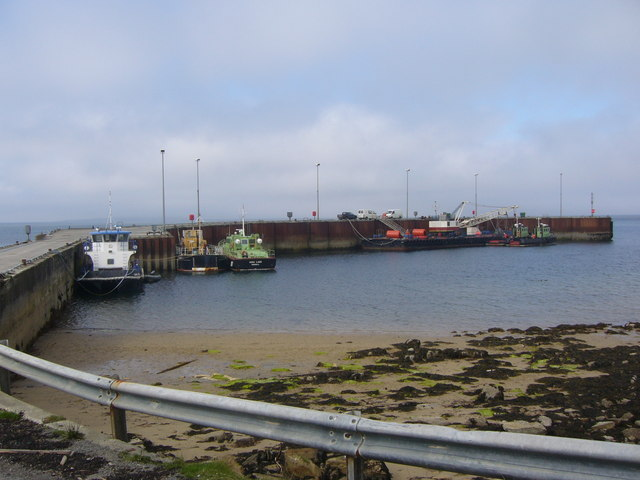
Sutherland Pier

The island is served by Orkney Ferries with ferry links to Houton on the Orkney Mainland, Lyness on Hoy, and Longhope on South Walls. The ferries berth at Gibraltar Pier, also known as Heyspan Pier, which is to the north-west of the island in Weddel Sound. Orkney Ferries' South Isles service is usually provided by MV Hoy Head, whilst MV Thorsvoe serves as a relief vessel. Flotta is situated a few miles from St Margaret's Hope on South Ronaldsay, which has a direct ferry service to mainland Scotland. However, there is no direct public ferry service between Flotta and South Ronaldsay, across the Sound of Hoxa. For a transport connection to the Scottish mainland, one must instead travel by ferry to Houton, and then by road to either Stromness or to St. Margaret's Hope, via a much more circuitous route.

A couple of hundred metres to the south-west of Gibraltar Pier is Sutherland Pier, also in Weddel Sound. Sutherland Pier is used by local vessels of similar size to the ferries. A third public pier, Pan Pier, is situated at the southern side of Pan Hope, the island's central bay. Pan Pier is used by smaller private boats. The oil terminal has its own jetty on the northern side of the island, which has the capability to accommodate oil tankers.

=== Airport ===
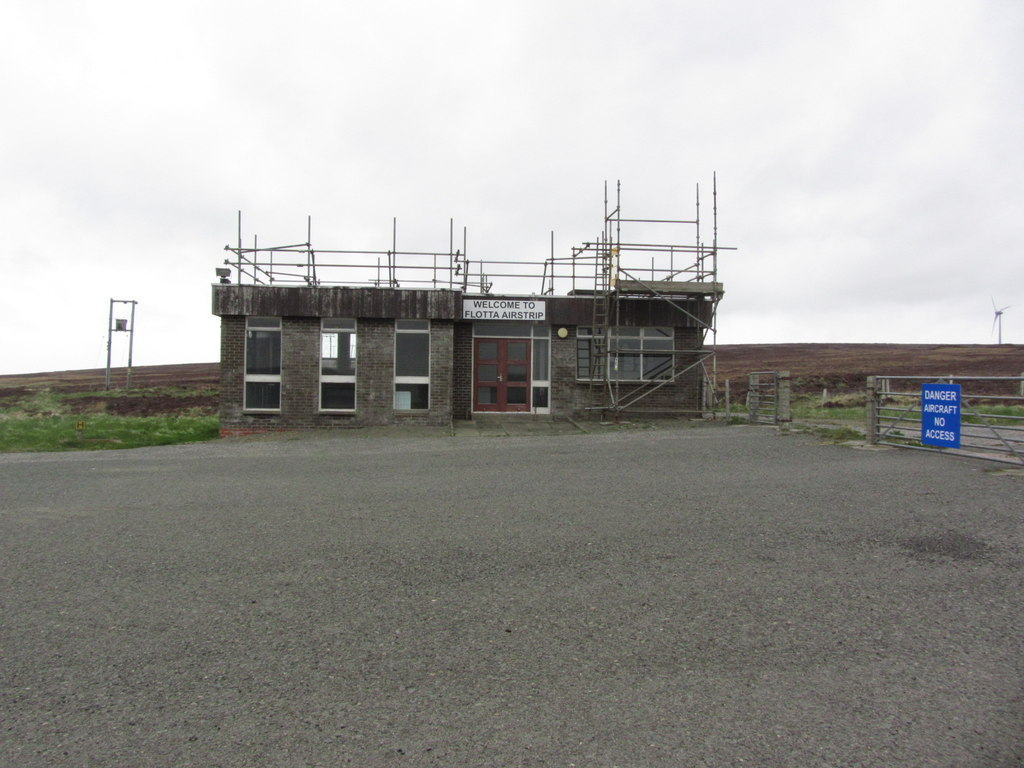
Flotta Airport terminal building, undergoing maintenance

Flotta Isle Airport is located on the south side of the island. It opened in 1976 as an inter-island airport, and changed hands to Elf Exploration UK in 2001. Today, the airport is used only for emergency landings, and air ambulances.

=== Road ===
The main roads on Flotta are the B9045 and the B9046, which connect the ferry terminal with the settlement of Whome. Flotta has no causeways similar to the Churchill Barriers, which could allow vehicles to be driven to the nearby islands. All road vehicles are reliant on using the ferry to the Orkney Mainland, and to Hoy.

== People from Flotta ==
- Sutherland Simpson FRSE (1863-1926) physiologist

== See also ==
- List of islands of Scotland
