= Flotta Isle Airport =

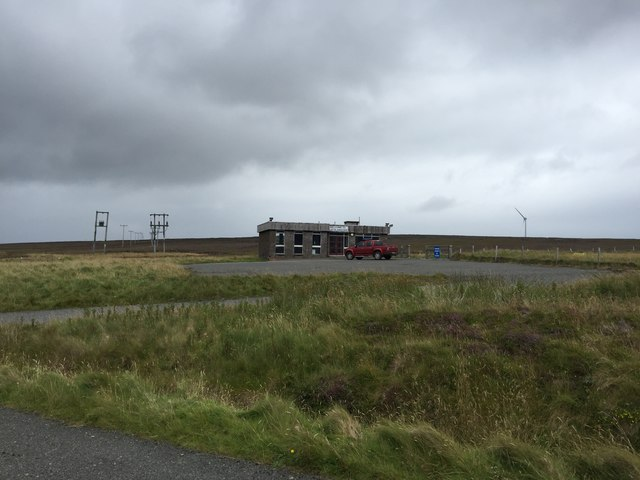
- Flotta Isle Airport terminal building in 2017
- IATA: FLH; ICAO: none

Summary
- Airport type: Public
- Owner: Orkney Islands Council
- Serves: Whome, Flotta
- Location: Flotta, Scotland
- Elevation AMSL: 70 ft / 21 m
- Coordinates: 58°49′33″N 003°08′34″W

Map
- Location in Orkney

Runways
Direction	Length		Surface
Direction	m	ft	Surface
16/34	760	2,490	Asphalt

Flotta Isle Airport (IATA: FLH) is a small airport located on the Orkney isle of Flotta. The asphalt runway orientation is at 16/34, with an elevation of 70 feet (21 m), and is 2,490 feet (760 m) in length. The airport also has a helipad, adjacent to the eastern side of the northern end of the runway.

== History ==
The first landing on Flotta was made by a Loganair Islander aircraft, G-AWNR, on 28 May 1976. The first scheduled air service to Flotta was flown via Hoy on 1 March 1977 and the service was flown by another Loganair Islander aircraft, G-AXVR. Crew change operations for the Occidental Petroleum oil terminal were also performed by a British Airways HS748. Loganair's scheduled services to Flotta were discontinued in 1981, as a direct result of free ferry services being provided by the oil company.

On 20 April 1983, a charter flight from Aberdeen Airport of an Air Ecosse de Havilland DHC-6, aircraft registration G-STUD, crashed at Flotta Airport. The aircraft was caught in a strong crosswind as it landed, which caused the crash. There were no serious injuries, and no fatalities, amongst the two crew and ten passengers.

In 2001 the airstrip changed hands to Elf Exploration UK plc and today the airfield is mainly used by emergency services.
