= Flotta oil terminal =

Crude oil facility on Flotta, Orkney, Scotland

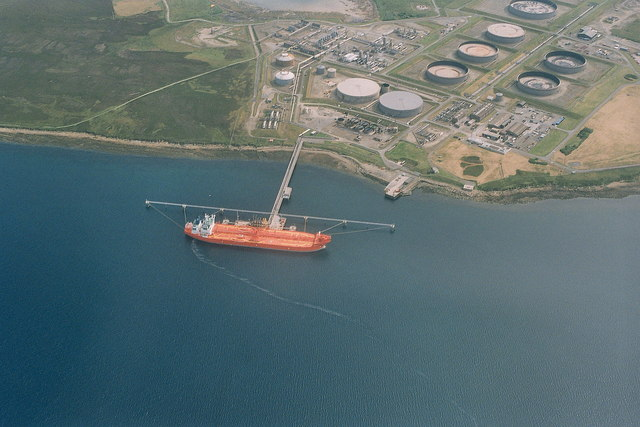
- Flotta oil terminal from above in 2007
- Interactive map of Flotta oil terminal
- Location: Flotta, Orkney, Scotland; 58°50′22″N 03°06′24″W

Refinery details
- Operator: Occidental (1974–1991), Elf Enterprises (1991–2000), Repsol Sinopec Resources UK Limited (since 2000)
- Owners: Occidental (1974–1991), Elf Enterprises (1991–2000), Repsol Sinopec Resources UK Limited (since 2000)
- Opened: 1974
- Capacity: 375,000 barrels per day (59,600 m^{3}/d) (2017)
- No. of employees: 275 (in 1987), 200 (in 1995)

The Flotta oil terminal is a major crude oil reception, processing, storage and export facility on the island of Flotta, in the south of Scapa Flow in the Orkney Islands. It receives and processes crude oil delivered by a subsea pipeline from the Piper, Claymore, Tartan and Golden Eagle platforms and associated fields. The terminal includes facilities for exporting stabilised crude oil (and formerly liquefied petroleum gases) by tanker.

== History ==
The Piper oil field was discovered by the Occidental Group in January 1973 and the adjacent Claymore field in May 1974. Occidental considered a number of options for exporting oil from the planned installations, these included offshore loading and pipelines to shore. Nine potential onshore sites for the pipeline terminal were considered. The island of Flotta was selected as it met operational needs and minimised the impact on the natural environment.

The Planning Authority gave planning consent in January 1974 for phase 1 of the development for the Piper field. The terminal (coordinates 58° 20’ 22” N 03° 06’ 24” W) received ‘live’ crude oil from Piper Alpha via a 125-mile (210 km) 30-inch diameter trunk pipeline. The facilities at Flotta included a plant for stabilising crude oil at up to 250,000 barrels/day; storage tanks; and stabilised crude and liquefied petroleum gases (LPG) ship loading facilities.

Phase 2, to accommodate the processing of oil from the Claymore field, was granted in summer 1976 and entailed additional plant and tanks. The cost of the Flotta terminal was about $240 million (1978 prices). The total cost of the terminal and associated pipelines was estimated in 1984 to be $650 million (1984 prices).

== The plant ==
Phase 1 of the development of the Flotta terminal included:

- Pipeline reception facilities including a pig receiver
- Five 500,000 barrel capacity floating roof crude oil storage tanks
- Two stabilisation process trains each with a capacity of 125,000 barrels/day
- Propane storage and transfer facilities
- Two single point mooring towers in Scapa Flow for tankers up to 200,000 dead weight tonnes (DWT), with 48-inch diameter loading lines
- LPG jetty capable of handing ships up to 30,000 DWT
- Flare system
- Ballast water treatment and disposal, 36-inch deballasting lines, plus 36-inch diameter disposal line
- Utilities: power generation, firewater, instrument air, inert gas, fuel oil, hot oil, potable water, waste water, sewage treatment.

The engineering, procurement and construction was undertaken by Bechtel International Limited. Turiff Taylor Tarmac was the general construction contractor. Motherwell Bridge Engineering was responsible for the crude oil storage tanks, LPG tanks, desalter tanks, flare system and firewater system. NATCO was responsible for design of the process equipment.

Phase 1 of the Flotta terminal was complete by Christmas 1976 and oil processing operations started.

Permission was granted to extend the plant (phase 2) in summer 1976 to accommodate the additional flow of crude oil exported from Claymore via the Piper to Flotta pipeline. Phase 2 included:

- Two floating roof tanks of 1,000,000 barrels capacity
- Two additional process oil stabilisation trains
- Uprating the LPG jetty to handle 120,000 DWT tankers

The engineering procurement and construction was undertaken by Occidental Engineering Company. Motherwell Bridge Engineering constructed the tanks. Phase 2 was completed by late 1977. By summer 1978 the landscaping of the terminal was complete.

== Operations ==
=== Flotta pipelines ===
The Flotta oil pipeline system comprises the following lines.

Flotta pipeline system
| From – To | Length, miles | Diameter, inches | Year commissioned |
|---|---|---|---|
| Piper A – Flotta | 130 | 30 | 1976 |
| Claymore – Claymore TEE on Piper to Flotta trunkline | 8 | 30 | 1977 |
| Tartan – Claymore | 17 | 24 | 1980 |
| Scapa – Claymore | 3 | 10 | 1985 |
| Petronella – Tartan | 6 | 8 | 1986 |
| Highlander – Tartan | 9 | 12 | 1985 |
| Rob Roy & Ivanhoe – Claymore | 25 | 14 | 1989 |
| Hamish – Rob Roy | | | 1990 |
| Chanter – Piper B | 7 | 6 | 1993 |
| Piper B – Claymore tie in | 20 | 30 | 1993 |
| Saltire – Piper B | 4 | 10 | 1993 |
| Iona – Saltire | | | 1997 |
| MacCulloch (Northern Producer) – Piper B | 22 | 10 | 1997 |
| Galley – Tartan | 9 | 10 | 1998/2007 |
| Tweedsmuir – Piper B | 34 | 6 | 2007 |
| Duart – Tartan | 5 | 8 | 2007 |
| Golden Eagle – Claymore | 49 | 14 | 2014 |

The oil entry specification to the Piper to Flotta pipeline and hence to the Flotta terminal is as shown in the table.

Piper to Flotta pipeline entry specification
| Parameter | Value |
|---|---|
| °API gravity | 30 to 40 |
| Water | 2 % volume |
| Base sediment | 0.05 % vol. |
| Viscosity @ 25 °C | 10 cP |
| Pour point | –3 °C |
| Wax content | 6 % weight |
| True Vapor Pressure @ 100 °F | 120 psia |
| Total sulphur | 1 % wt. |
| H_{2}S | 1 ppm wt. |
| CO_{2} | 0.25 % mol |
| Total acid number | 0.05 mgKOH/g |
| Nickel | 4 ppm wt. |
| Vanadium | 8 ppm wt. |
| Mercury | 0.35 ppb wt. |

=== Processing ===
Live crude oil from the Piper to Flotta pipeline is routed to one or more of the four 125,000 barrels/day stabiliser trains. The trains include two stages of desalting to remove salt and water from the oil. Oil is heated and enters the stabiliser towers where the lighter fractions boil off. Stabilised crude from the base of the stabilisers is routed to the crude oil storage tanks.

The light ends from the top of the stabiliser are compressed and flow to the de-methaniser. The methane and ethane are removed from the top of the vessel and used as fuel gas with the surplus burned in the flare. The flaring rate in 1993 was 40,000 m^{3}/day or 1,460,000 cubic feet/day. Heavy ends from the base of the de-methaniser were routed to the de-ethaniser and then the de-propaniser. Propane from the top of the de-propaniser was chilled and liquefied and stored at –40 °C in two 100,000 barrel capacity insulated tanks. Butane and any heavier ends from the bottom of the de-propaniser are comingled with the stabilised crude.

Stabilised crude typically had the following properties.

Stabilised crude specification
| Parameter | Value |
|---|---|
| Density at 15 °C | 0.8412 kg/m^{3} |
| API gravity | 36.64°API |
| Total sulphur | 0.66 % weight |
| Total salts | 2.4 lb NaCl/1000 bbl |
| Water content | 0.03 % weight |
| Reid Vapor Pressure | 9.61 psi |

Stabilised crude oil from the storage tanks was routed via 48-inch diameter lines to either of the single point moorings (SPM) in Scapa Flow or to the jetty. LPG was loaded to the jetty.

The SPM loading rate was 50,000 BPH. The jetty had an oil loading rate of 80,000 BPH.

Ballast water from tankers was pumped to a 500,000 barrel storage tank. It was treated in a floatation unit before discharge via a 1.5 mile 36-inch diameter pipeline into the turbulent waters of the Pentland Firth to aid dispersal.

=== Throughput ===
The total oil throughput of the terminal up to the end of 1997 was 258,529 thousand tonnes.

Peak production was 421,590 barrels/day on 4 November 1978.

== Ownership ==
The initial Occidental Group comprised: Occidental of Britain Incorporated, Allied Chemicals (Great Britain) Limited, Thomson North Sea Limited, and Getty Oil Britain Limited.

In 1984 the Occidental Consortium comprised Occidental Petroleum (Caledonia) Limited, 36.50%; Texaco Britain Limited, 23.50%; International Thomson plc, 20.00%; Union Texas Petroleum Limited, 20.00%.

Following the Piper Alpha disaster in July 1988 Elf Enterprises Caledonia Limited and its partners assumed ownership of the pipeline and the Flotta terminal.

Repsol Sinopec Resources UK Limited became the major shareholder and operator in May 2000.

== Developments ==
Following commissioning of Piper Alpha in December 1976 the following developments took place.

- The Claymore platform came on stream on 14 November 1977, oil production was via a TEE on the Piper Alpha to Flotta trunkline.
- The Tartan platform began production to Flotta in 1981 via the Claymore installation.

By 31 December 1984 883 million barrels of oil had been processed at Flotta and 1,554 tankers had been loaded.

The following fields producing to the Flotta system were developed in the mid-1980s.

New oil fields producing to Flotta oil terminal 1985–6
| Field | Installation | Production to | Oil production rate, million tonnes /year | Year commissioned |
|---|---|---|---|---|
| Highlander | Subsea | Tartan | 1.4 | 1985 |
| Scapa | Subsea | Claymore | 1.4 + 0.01 NGL | 1985 |
| Petronella | Subsea | Tartan | 0.6 | 1986 |

The Piper Alpha disaster occurred on 6 July 1988. Production from, and via, Piper ceased.

The following fields, producing to the Flotta system, were developed from 1989.

New oil fields producing to Flotta oil terminal from 1989
| Field | Installation | Production to | Oil production rate, million tonnes /year | Year commissioned |
|---|---|---|---|---|
| Rob Roy | Subsea | Claymore | 1.7 | 1989, decommissioned |
| Ivanhoe | Subsea | Claymore | 1.3 | 1989, decommissioned |
| Hamish | Subsea | Rob Roy | 0.1 | 1990, decommissioned |
| Piper Bravo | Platform | Flotta via Claymore tie in | 4.5 | 1993 |
| Chanter | Subsea | Piper B | 0.2 + 0.2 condensate | 1993 |
| Saltire | Platform | Piper B | 2.3 + 0.10 NGLs | 1993 |
| Iona | Subsea | Saltire | 0.05 + 0.006 NGLs | 1997 |
| MacCulloch | Semi-submersible (Northern Producer) /Subsea | Piper B | 2.9 | 1997, decommissioned |
| Galley | Semi-submersible (AH001) / Subsea | Tartan | 35,000 bbl/d | 1998 & 2007 |
| Tweedsmuir | Subsea | Piper B | | 2007 |
| Duart | Subsea | Tartan | 6,000 bbl/d | 2007 |
| Golden Eagle | Platform | Claymore | 70,000 bbl/d | 2014 |

The Golden Eagle development effectively doubled the production through Flotta terminal.

By 2017, 40 years after being commissioned, 2.6 billion barrels of oil had been processed through the Flotta terminal.

By 2017 one of the stabiliser trains had been decommissioned. The three remaining trains had a combined capacity of 375,000 barrels/day.

By 2017 there were insufficient volumes of gas to make the operation of the gas plant economically viable. There was a proposal to decommission the system. Gas from the stabilisers was used to generate electricity and as fuel gas in the hot oil heaters.

The Single Point Moorings have been mothballed and are not operational.

As currently operated (2020) the terminal only exports stabilised crude oil through tankers loaded at the jetty. In 2016 50 tankers visited the terminal.

== See also ==
- North Sea Oil
- Oil terminal
- Sullom Voe Terminal
- Teesside oil terminal
- Oil terminals in the United Kingdom
- List of oil and gas fields in the North Sea
