= Switha =

Island in Orkney, Scotland

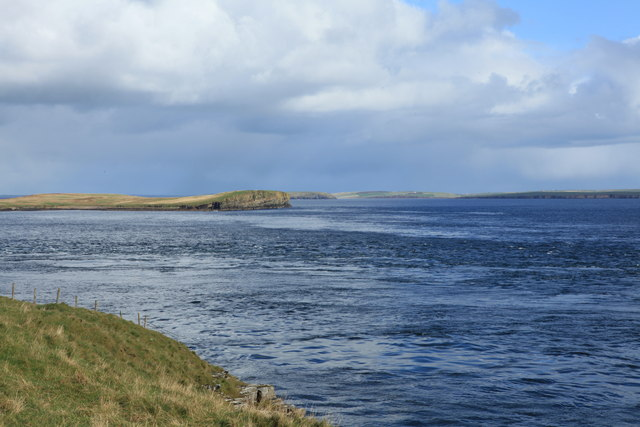
- Cantick Sound, from South Walls, with Switha beyond

Location
- Switha shown within Orkney
- OS grid reference: ND365905
- Coordinates: 58.798°N 3.098°W

Physical geography
- Island group: Orkney
- Area: 41 hectares (0.16 sq mi)
- Area rank: 217=
- Highest elevation: 28 metres (92 ft)

Administration
- Council area: Orkney Islands
- Country: Scotland
- Sovereign state: United Kingdom

Demographics
- Population: 0

Switha is an uninhabited island towards the south of Orkney, Scotland, approximately 41 hectares in area.

== Geography and geology ==
Switha lies 2 km to the south of the island of Flotta and 2 km east of the South Walls area of Hoy. South Ronaldsay lies about 5 km further east. The island is roughly rectangular in shape, about 1 km by 0.5 km in size and is aligned in a NE to SW direction. The maximum elevation is 28 m, found on the small cliff on the south coast, to the west of which is the only appreciable beach at The Pool. Geologically, the island is wholly of Old Red Sandstone, from the Devonian period, specifically Rousay Flagstones, dating from about 375 MYA, laid down by a cyclical series of lakes and containing many fish fossils.

== Flora ==
The island is predominantly maritime grassland with small areas of heath and bog.

== Wildlife ==
Switha is very important for wildlife and has been designated both as a Site of Special Scientific Interest (SSSI) and an EU Special Protection Area. The primary reason for this is the wintering population of Greenland barnacle goose. About 1000 of the birds are thought to spend the winter months roosting on the island and feeding on nearby South Walls. This population is not only the most northerly in the UK but also the third largest after Islay and North Uist. Common seabirds known to frequent the rocky coast line include black guillemot, great black-backed gull, Arctic skua and great skua. In addition, Haswell-Smith records that there are many European storm petrel burrows. However, several surveys since the late 1960s have only revealed a small number of pairs on the island, probably never more than 10. The burrows are probably more likely to belong to the puffin, which are reported to be resident on the island in some numbers, with about 250 pairs.

== History ==
=== Pre-history ===
The presence of Neolithic standing stones and a cairn show that the island was at least visited in prehistoric times. There are two standing stones, the larger, southerly stone is 147 cm high, by 91 cm wide and 30 cm deep. The northerly stone is 112 cm high, 48 cm wide and just 15 cm deep and is thus somewhat smaller. Further evidence of pre-historic use is provided by the presence of a 9 m diameter by 0.5 m high turf covered cairn, near The Ool at the southern tip of the island. When excavated the cairn contained a cist-like structure.

Haswell-Smith (2004) maintains there is no written record of any post-Neolithic habitation, and there are 3 further sources that would support that assertion, at least for the past 350 years. The Blaeu Atlas of Scotland (1654) stated that the island was "neither inhabited nor cultivated". The Imperial Gazetteer of Scotland, published in 1848, stated that the island was uninhabited. Finally, the Ordnance Survey map of 1882 doesn't indicate any significant building or habitation, although the enclosure mentioned below would seem to be present. Whether the island was uninhabited prior to 1654 is less certain since the Descriptions of Orkney, written in 1529, states that the entire population of an island, "Southay" presumed to refer to Switha, is said to have died while sailing to a Christmas celebration on a neighboring island, and the island had never been populated since. In addition, there are archeological remains that could represent old dwellings, for instance a stone closure at the southern end of the island.

=== Agricultural use ===
The island would seem to have had a long history of use for agriculture, at least for keeping stock. In current times the island is wholly used for sheep grazing. Older texts support the island's use for other livestock however, for instance it is recorded that in 1747–48, 11 oxen were kept on Switha, part of the Burray inventory.

== See also ==
- List of islands of Scotland
