= SM UB-116 =

1917 German Type UB III submarine

- UB-148 at sea, a U-boat similar to UB-116.

History

German Empire
- Name: UB-116
- Ordered: 6 / 8 February 1917
- Builder: Blohm & Voss, Hamburg
- Cost: 3,714,000 German Papiermark
- Yard number: 322
- Launched: 4 November 1917
- Commissioned: 24 May 1918
- Fate: Sunk by remote-controlled mine 28 October 1918 at 58°50′N 3°4′W

General characteristics
- Class & type: Type UB III submarine
- Displacement: 519 t (511 long tons) surfaced; 649 t (639 long tons) submerged
- Length: 55.30 m (181 ft 5 in) (o/a)
- Beam: 5.80 m (19 ft)
- Draught: 3.70 m (12 ft 2 in)
- Propulsion: 2 × propeller shaft; 2 × MAN-Vulcan four-stroke 6-cylinder diesel engines, 1,085 bhp (809 kW); 2 × AEG electric motors, 780 shp (580 kW)
- Speed: 13.3 knots (24.6 km/h; 15.3 mph) surfaced; 7.5 knots (13.9 km/h; 8.6 mph) submerged
- Range: 7,420 nmi (13,740 km; 8,540 mi) at 6 knots (11 km/h; 6.9 mph) surfaced; 55 nmi (102 km; 63 mi) at 4 knots (7.4 km/h; 4.6 mph) submerged
- Test depth: 50 m (160 ft)
- Complement: 3 officers, 31 men
- Armament: 5 × 50 cm (19.7 in) torpedo tubes (4 bow, 1 stern); 10 torpedoes; 1 × 8.8 cm (3.46 in) deck gun

Service record
- Part of: Flandern I Flotilla; 15 August – 4 October 1918; III Flotilla; 4 – 28 October 1918
- Commanders: Oblt.z.S. Erich Stephan; 24 May – 4 October 1918; Oblt.z.S. Hans Joachim Emsmann; 5 – 28 October 1918
- Operations: 4 patrols
- Victories: None

SM UB-116 was a German Type UB III submarine or U-boat in the German Imperial Navy (German: Kaiserliche Marine) during World War I. She was commissioned into the German Imperial Navy on 24 May 1918 as SM UB-116. (Note: "SM" stands for "Seiner Majestät" (English: His Majesty's) and combined with the U for Unterseeboot would be translated as His Majesty's Submarine.)

UB-116 was sunk by a remote-controlled mine at 58°50′N 3°4′W off Orkney while making an attempt to enter Scapa Flow in order to attack units of the British Grand Fleet as part of the final German Naval offensive of the war.

According to Uboat.net, UB-116 hit a mine and was next finished off by depth charges while trying to reach the empty Scapa anchorage. All hands were lost (36 sailors).

== Construction ==
She was built by Blohm & Voss of Hamburg and following just under a year of construction, launched at Hamburg on 4 November 1917. UB-116 was commissioned in the spring the next year under the command of Oblt.z.S. Erich Stephan. Like all Type UB III submarines, UB-116 carried 10 torpedoes and was armed with a 8.8 cm (3.46 in) deck gun. UB-116 would carry a crew of up to 3 officer and 31 men and had a cruising range of 7,420 nautical miles (13,740 km; 8,540 mi). UB-116 had a displacement of 519 t (511 long tons) while surfaced and 649 t (639 long tons) when submerged. Her engines enabled her to travel at 13.3 knots (24.6 km/h; 15.3 mph) when surfaced and 7.4 knots (13.7 km/h; 8.5 mph) when submerged.

== Bibliography ==
- Bendert, Harald (2000). Die UB-Boote der Kaiserlichen Marine, 1914-1918. Einsätze, Erfolge, Schicksal (in German). Hamburg: Verlag E.S. Mittler & Sohn GmbH. ISBN 3-8132-0713-7.
- Gröner, Erich; Jung, Dieter; Maass, Martin (1991). German Warships 1815–1945, U-boats and Mine Warfare Vessels. Vol. 2. Translated by Thomas, Keith; Magowan, Rachel. London: Conway Maritime Press. ISBN 0-85177-593-4.
- Rössler, Eberhard (1979). Die deutschen U-Boote und ihre Werften: eine Bilddokumentation über den deutschen U-Bootbau; in zwei Bänden (in German). Vol. I. Munich: Bernard & Graefe. ISBN 3-7637-5213-7.
