= Whome =

Village in the Orkney Islands

Coordinates: 58.83°N 3.1°W

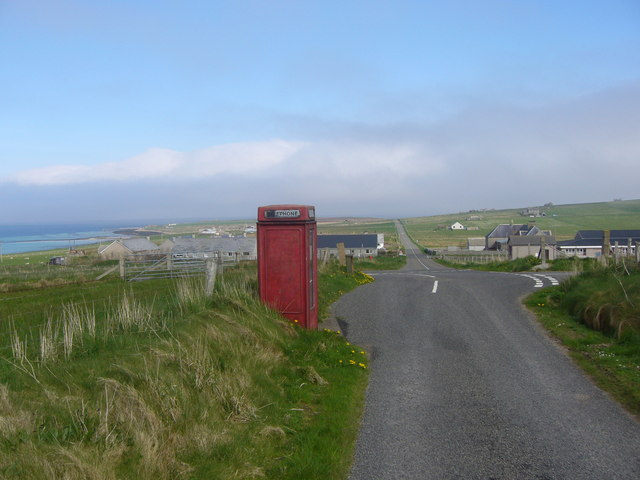
- Whome telephone box in 2007, looking down to the village.

- Location within Orkney
- Population: 30
- OS grid reference: ND352938
- Civil parish: Walls and Flotta
- Council area: Orkney
- Lieutenancy area: Orkney
- Country: Scotland
- Sovereign state: United Kingdom
- Post town: STROMNESS
- Postcode district: KW16
- Dialling code: 01856
- Police: Scotland
- Fire: Scottish
- Ambulance: Scottish
- UK Parliament: Orkney and Shetland
- Scottish Parliament: Orkney

Whome, referred to as Burnside by locals, is the largest settlement on the Orkney island of Flotta, Scotland. The village is situated on the B9046, the main road across Flotta. Views from Whome look across Pan Hope, to the Flotta oil terminal across the bay. The B9046 on the outskirts of Whome adjoins to the B9045, leading down to the Flotta ferry terminal.

== History ==
Much of Whome was developed during the 1970-1980s, built as council housing, however the settlement takes its name from the nearby centuries-old Whome Farm, the kiln and barn of which became a Category C listed building in 2002. It grew following the North Sea oil boom in the 1970s, and much of the social housing in Whome accommodated workers at the Flotta oil terminal during the 1980s. The main council housing estate in Whome is known as Burnside.

== Facilities ==
Flotta Community School is located in Whome. The school was mothballed in 2010 due to lack of pupils, but has since reopened. The Flotta Community Centre is also located in Whome, which accommodates a cafe, as well as a pub every Saturday night.

The village also has a doctor's surgery. Flotta had its own resident GP, until Dr George Drever died in 2003. Today, a GP travels over to the island every Tuesday and Friday from the Stromness surgery on the Mainland, and a resident practitioner nurse still offers 24 hour medical care on Flotta. The Flotta Heritage Centre is located in Whome, next door to the shop and post office. The shop stopped stocking general groceries on 1 June 2022.

Whome has a playpark, a telephone box, and the Flotta Fire Station, until its closure on 25 October 2012.

== Bibliography ==
- 1st Edition 25" OS Map (CXIX.15), 1881; A Fenton, THE NORTHERN ISLES, 1978; pp375–383; P Newman, KIL, Vernacular Building 18, 1994, pp48–66.
- Birth Records for Whome, Flotta, 1891
