= Golden Eagle Oilfield =

UK oil field

Coordinates: 57°58′N 0°55′W

The Golden Eagle oilfield is an offshore oil field in Scottish territorial waters in water depths of up to 114 metres (374 ft). Located around 70 miles (110 km) north-east of Aberdeen, it occupies licence block 20/1N. The nearby Peregrine field (block 20/1S) and Solitaire field (block 14/26a) also form part of the Golden Eagle Area Development.

The development is operated by Nexen, which has a 36.54% interest in the fields. The other partners are TotalEnergies (31.56%), Suncor Energy (26.69%) and Edinburgh Oil and Gas (5.21%).

== History ==
The Golden Eagle field was discovered in 2007 and is the second largest oil find in the UK North Sea since Buzzard was discovered in 2001. The Peregrine field was discovered in 2008.

The Solitaire field was discovered much earlier, in 2001, but was not regarded as being large enough to be worth developing on its own. The stakeholders in the Golden Eagle Area Development purchased it in 2010 and will use the Golden Eagle field infrastructure to exploit it.

Approval for the Golden Eagle Area Development project was granted by the UK Department of Energy and Climate Change in October 2011 and production began in November 2014 at a rate of 18,000 barrels of oil a day. Peak production will hit 70,000 barrels a day, with a total of 140 million barrels expected to be recovered over 18 years of operation.

== Development ==
Two platforms were constructed for the field - a wellhead platform (WHP) and a process, utility and quarters platform (PUQ) - with a bridge to connect them. A total of 15 production wells and six water injection wells are scheduled to be drilled during the lifetime of the development. Oil is piped to the Flotta oil terminal in Orkney.

Heerema was commissioned to build the jackets for the two platforms, which were delivered in 2013, while Technip supplied and installed the subsea equipment. CB&I was awarded the contract for engineering design of the topsides, which were built by Lamprell in Dubai and delivered in June 2013 (WHP) and April 2014 (PUQ). Sembmarine SLP was awarded the contract for engineering, procurement and construction of the 140-person, six-level accommodation module, with a lightweight aluminium flooring system supplied by Alphastrut, which was installed in May 2014. Sembmarine SLP also won the contract to build the bridge structure, while GE Oil & Gas provided production and control equipment.

== See also ==
- List of oil and gas fields of the North Sea
