= Scapa Flow =

Bay in the Orkney Islands, Scotland

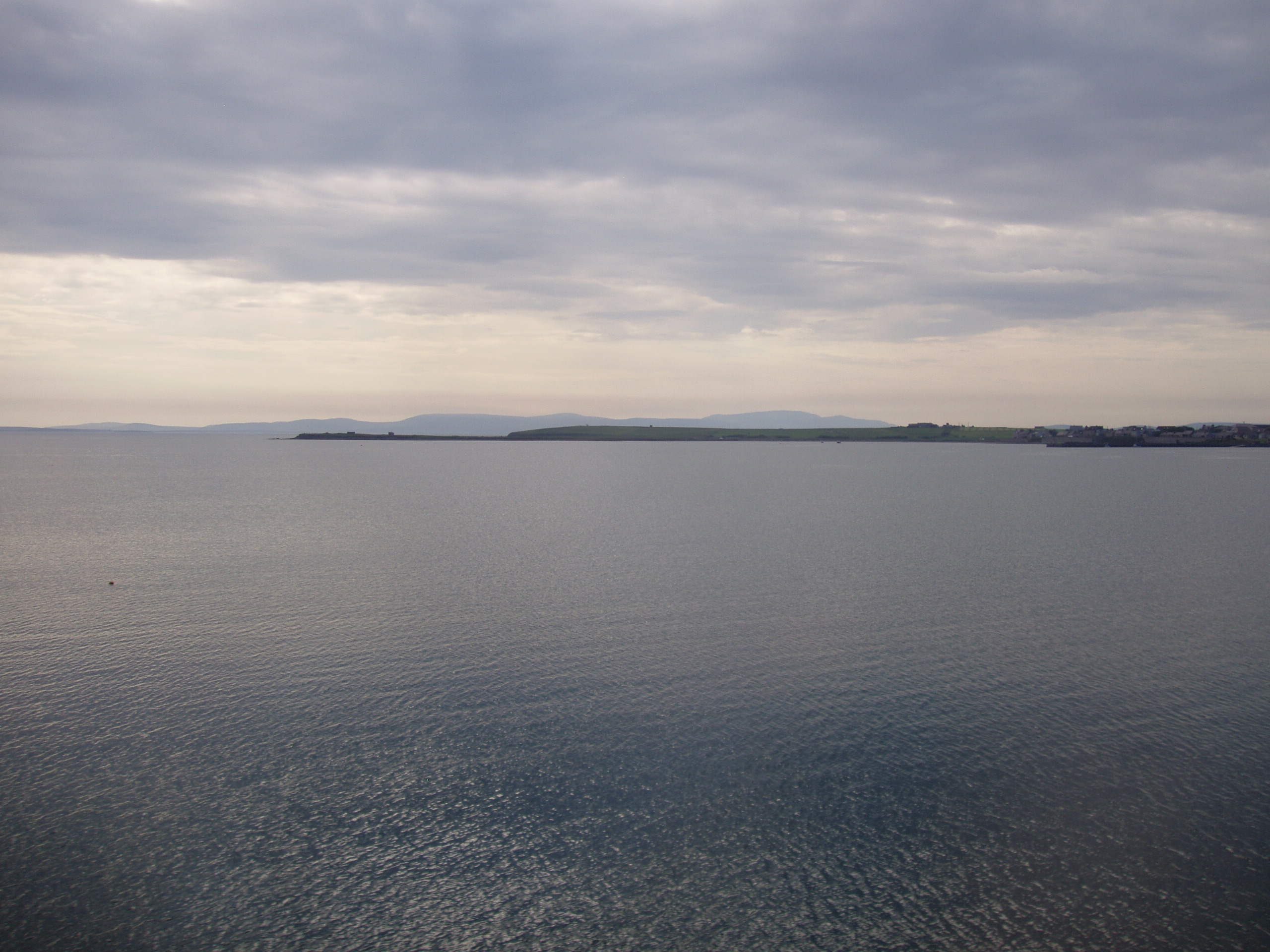
- Scapa Flow viewed from its eastern end in June 2009

- Location within Scotland
- Location: Orkney, Scotland
- Coordinates: 58°54′N 3°03′W

Location in the Orkney Islands

Scapa Flow location map

Scapa Flow (/ˈskɑːpə, ˈskæpə/; from Old Norse Skalpaflói 'bay of the long isthmus') is a body of water in the Orkney Islands, Scotland, sheltered by the islands of Mainland, Graemsay, Burray, South Ronaldsay and Hoy. Its sheltered waters have played an important role in travel, trade and conflict throughout the centuries. Vikings anchored their longships in Scapa Flow more than a thousand years ago. It was the United Kingdom's chief naval base during the First and Second World Wars, but the facility was closed in 1956.

Since the scuttling of the German fleet after World War I, its wrecks and their marine habitats have become a popular diving location.

Scapa Flow hosts an oil port, the Flotta oil terminal. In good weather, its roadstead (water of moderate conditions) allows ship-to-ship transfers of crude oil products. The world's first ship-to-ship transfer of liquefied natural gas (LNG) took place in Scapa Flow in 2007, transferring 132,000 m^{3} of LNG. This occurred under the direction of Excelerate Energy, between the vessels Excalibur and Excelsior.

== Environment ==
Scapa Flow has a shallow sandy bottom not deeper than 60 metres (200 ft), and mainly about 30 m (100 ft) deep; it is one of the great natural harbours and anchorages of the world, with sufficient space to shelter multiple navies. The harbour has an area of 324.5 square kilometres (125.3 sq mi).

=== Important Bird Area ===
Scapa Flow has been designated an Important Bird Area (IBA) by BirdLife International due to its wintering populations of velvet scoters, horned grebes, common loons, European shags and Eurasian curlews, as well as its breeding population of black guillemots.

== History ==
=== Middle Ages ===
The Viking expeditions to Orkney are recorded in detail in the 11th century Orkneyinga sagas, as well as in later texts such as the Hákonar saga Hákonarsonar. According to the latter, King Haakon IV of Norway anchored his fleet, including the flagship Kroussden which could carry nearly 300 men, on 5 August 1263 at St Margaret's Hope, where he saw an eclipse of the sun before he sailed south to the Battle of Largs. En route back to Norway, Haakon anchored some of his fleet in Scapa Flow for the winter, but he died that December while staying at the Bishop's Palace in Kirkwall. In the 15th century, towards the end of Norse rule in Orkney, the islands were run by the jarls from large manor farms, some of which were at Burray, Burwick, Paplay, Hoy, and Cairston (near Stromness) to guard the entrances to the Flow.

=== Wars of the Three Kingdoms ===
In 1650 during the wars of the Three Kingdoms, the Royalist general James Graham, 1st Marquess of Montrose, moored his ship Herderinnan in Scapa Flow, in preparation for his attempt to raise a rebellion in Scotland. The enterprise ended in failure and rout at the Battle of Carbisdale.

=== First World War ===
==== Base for the British Grand Fleet ====
Historically, the main British naval bases were near the English Channel to counter the continental naval powers: the Dutch Republic, France, and Spain.

In 1904, in response to the build-up of the Imperial German Navy's High Seas Fleet, Britain decided that a northern base was needed to control the entrances to the North Sea, as part of a revised policy of distant rather than close blockade. First Rosyth in Fife was considered, then Invergordon at Cromarty Firth. Delayed construction left these largely unfortified by the outbreak of the First World War. Scapa Flow had been used many times for British exercises in the years before the war and when the time came for the fleet to move to a northern station, it was chosen for the main base of the British Grand Fleet—unfortified.

John Rushworth Jellicoe, admiral of the Grand Fleet, was constantly nervous about the possibility of submarine or destroyer attacks on Scapa Flow. Whilst the fleet spent most of the first year of the war patrolling the west coast of the British Isles, its base at Scapa was defensively reinforced, beginning with over sixty blockships sunk in the many entrance channels between the southern islands to enable the use of submarine nets and booms. These blocked approaches were backed by minefields, artillery, and concrete barriers.

German U-boats twice tried to enter the harbour during the war, but neither attempt was successful:

1. U-18 tried to enter in November 1914. A trawler searching for submarines rammed her, causing her to leak, prompting her flight and surfacing; one crew member died.
2. UB-116 made a foray in October 1918 but encountered the sophisticated defences then in place. It was detected by hydrophones before entering the anchorage, then destroyed by shore-triggered mines, killing all 36 hands.

After the Battle of Jutland, the German fleet rarely ventured out of its bases at Wilhelmshaven and Kiel, and in the last two years of the war, the British fleet was considered to have such a commanding superiority of the seas that some components moved south to the dockyard at Rosyth.

==== Scuttling of the German fleet ====
Following the German defeat, 74 ships of their High Seas Fleet were interned in Gutter Sound at Scapa Flow pending a decision on their future in the Treaty of Versailles.

On 21 June 1919, after seven months of waiting, German Rear Admiral Ludwig von Reuter decided to scuttle the fleet because the negotiation period for the treaty had lapsed with no word of a settlement. He had not been informed that there had been a last-minute extension to finalize the details.

After waiting for the bulk of the British fleet to leave on exercises, he gave the order to scuttle the ships to prevent their falling into British hands. The Royal Navy made desperate efforts to board the ships to prevent the sinkings, but the German crews had spent the idle months preparing for the order, welding bulkhead doors open, laying charges in vulnerable parts of the ships, and quietly dropping important keys and tools overboard so that valves could not be shut.

The Royal Navy managed to beach the battleship Baden, the light cruisers Emden, Nürnberg, and Frankfurt and 18 destroyers, whereas 53 ships, the vast bulk of the High Seas Fleet, were sunk. Nine German sailors died on some of these ships when British forces opened fire as they attempted to scuttle the ships, reputedly the last casualties of the war.

SMS Emden was amongst the ships the British managed to beach. Emden's predecessor was destroyed in the Battle of Cocos on 9 November 1914 by the Australian light cruiser HMAS Sydney.

At least seven of the scuttled German ships and some sunken British ships can be visited by divers.

=== Salvage operation ===
Although many of the larger ships "turned turtle" and came to rest upside down or on their sides in relatively deep water (25–45 m), some—including the battlecruiser Moltke—were left with parts of their superstructure or upturned bows still protruding from the water, while others had settled just below the surface.

These ships posed a severe hazard to navigation; small boats, trawlers, and drifters regularly became snagged on them with the rise and fall of the tides. The Admiralty initially declared that there would be no attempt at salvage, and that the sunken hulks would remain where they were, to "rest and rust". In the years immediately following the war, the country enjoyed an abundance of scrap metal as a result of the huge quantities of leftover tanks, artillery and ordnance. By the early 1920s, however, the situation had changed.

In 1922, the Admiralty invited tenders from interested parties for the salvage of the sunken ships, although at the time few believed that it would be possible to raise the deeper wrecks. The contract went to a wealthy engineer and scrap metal merchant, Ernest Cox, who created a new company, a division of Cox & Danks Ltd, for the venture, and so began what is often called the greatest maritime salvage operation of all time.

During the next eight years, Cox and his workforce of divers, engineers, and labourers engaged in the complex task of raising the sunken fleet. First the relatively small destroyers were winched to the surface using pontoons and floating docks to be sold for scrap to help finance the operation, then the bigger battleships and battlecruisers were lifted, by sealing the multiple holes in the wrecks, and welding to the hulls long steel tubes which protruded above the water, for use as airlocks. In this fashion the submerged hulls were made into air-tight chambers and raised with compressed air, still inverted, back to the surface.

Cox endured bad luck and frequent fierce storms which often ruined his work, swamping and re-sinking ships which had just been raised. At one stage, during the General Strike of 1926, the salvage operation was about to grind to a halt due to a lack of coal to feed the many boilers for the water pumps and generators. Cox ordered that the abundant fuel bunkers of the sunken (but only partly submerged) battlecruiser Seydlitz be broken into to extract the coal with mechanical grabs, allowing work to continue.

Although he ultimately lost money on the contract, Cox kept going, employing new technology and methods as conditions dictated. By 1939, Cox and Metal Industries Ltd. (the company that he had sold out to in 1932) had successfully raised 45 of the 52 scuttled ships. The last, the massive Derfflinger, was raised from a record depth of 45 metres just before work was suspended with the start of the Second World War, before being towed to Rosyth where it was broken up in 1946.

A Morse key recovered from the battleship Grosser Kurfürst during the salvage is displayed at a Fife museum.

=== Second World War ===
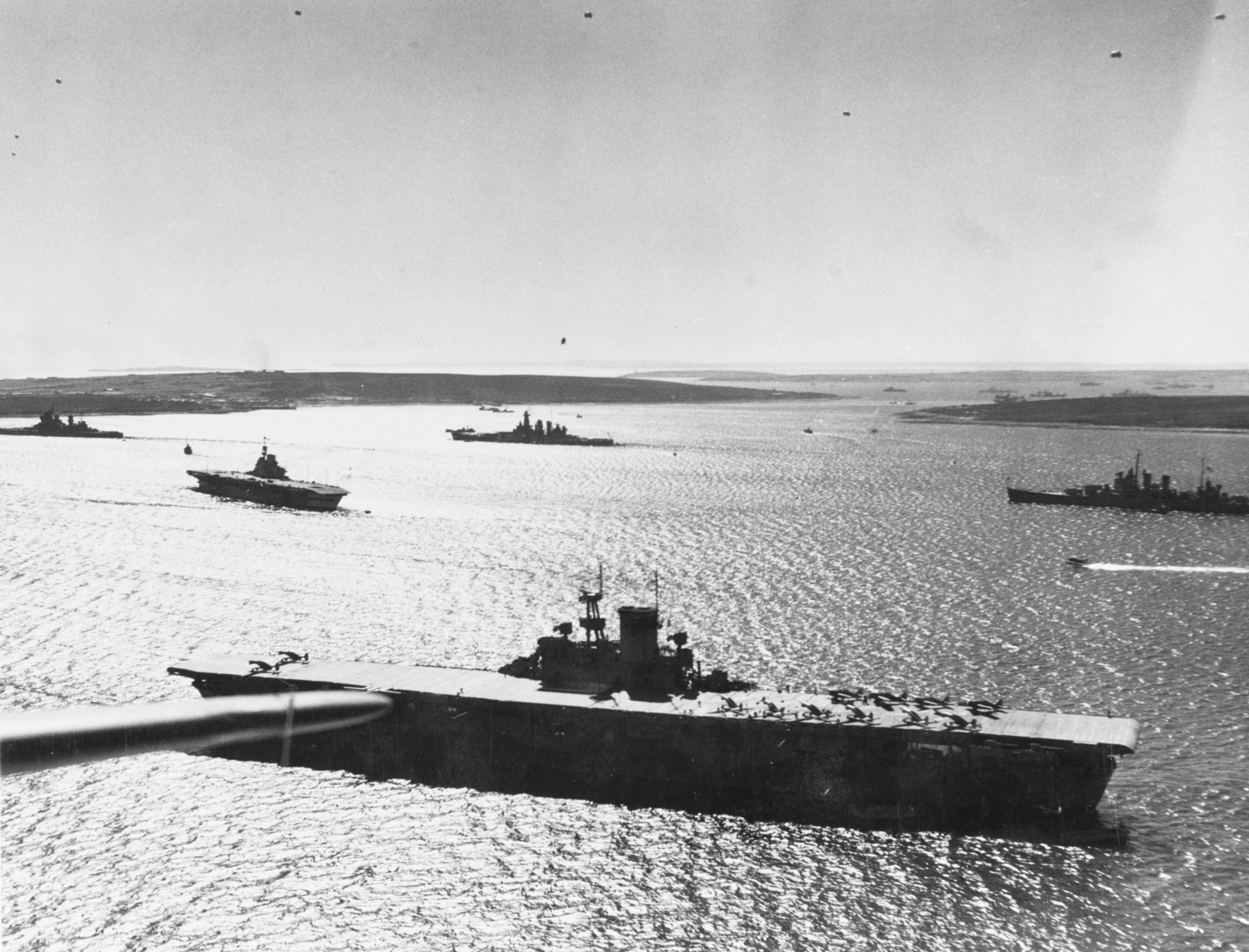
Scapa Flow in April 1942

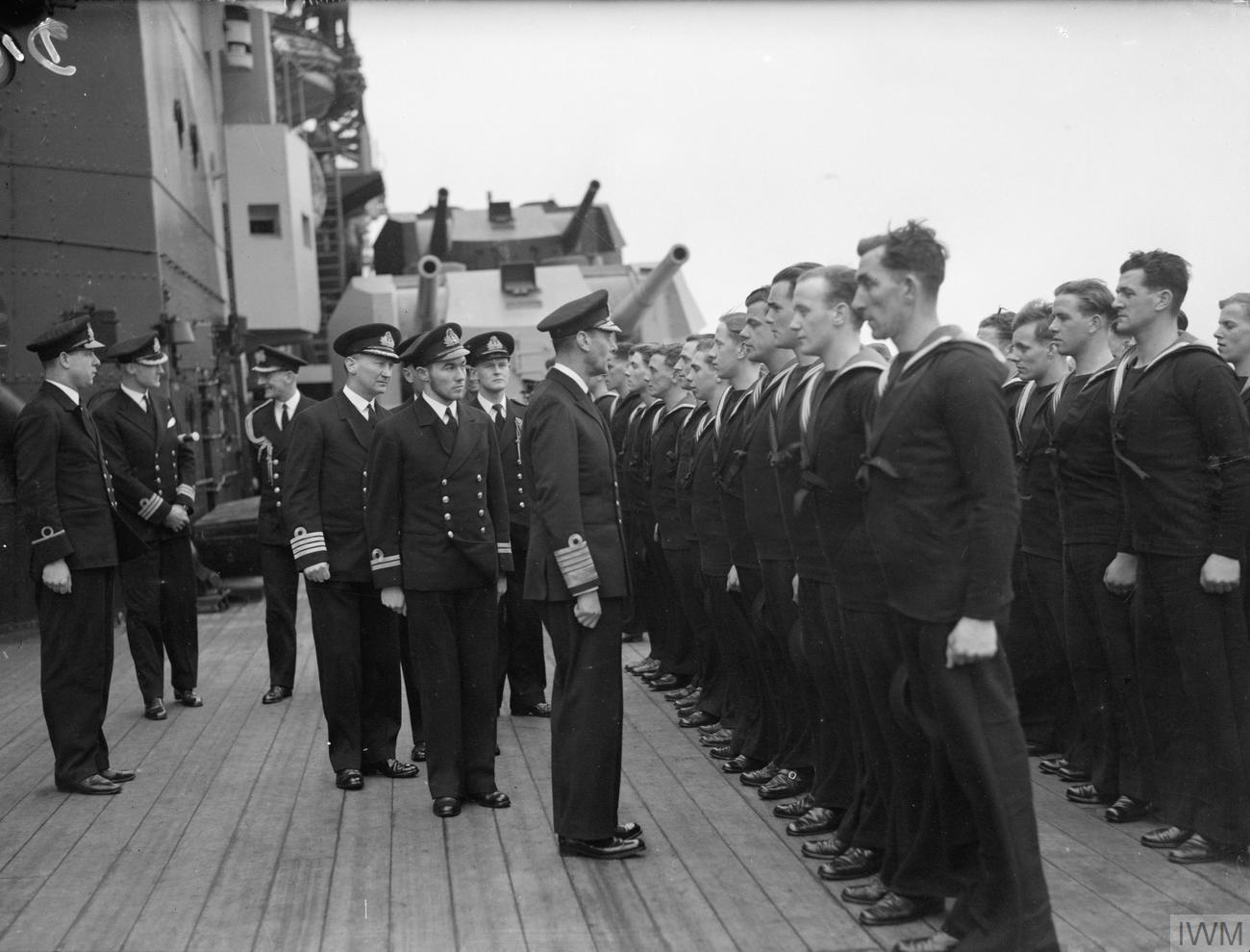
King George VI visiting the Home Fleet based at Scapa Flow, March 1943

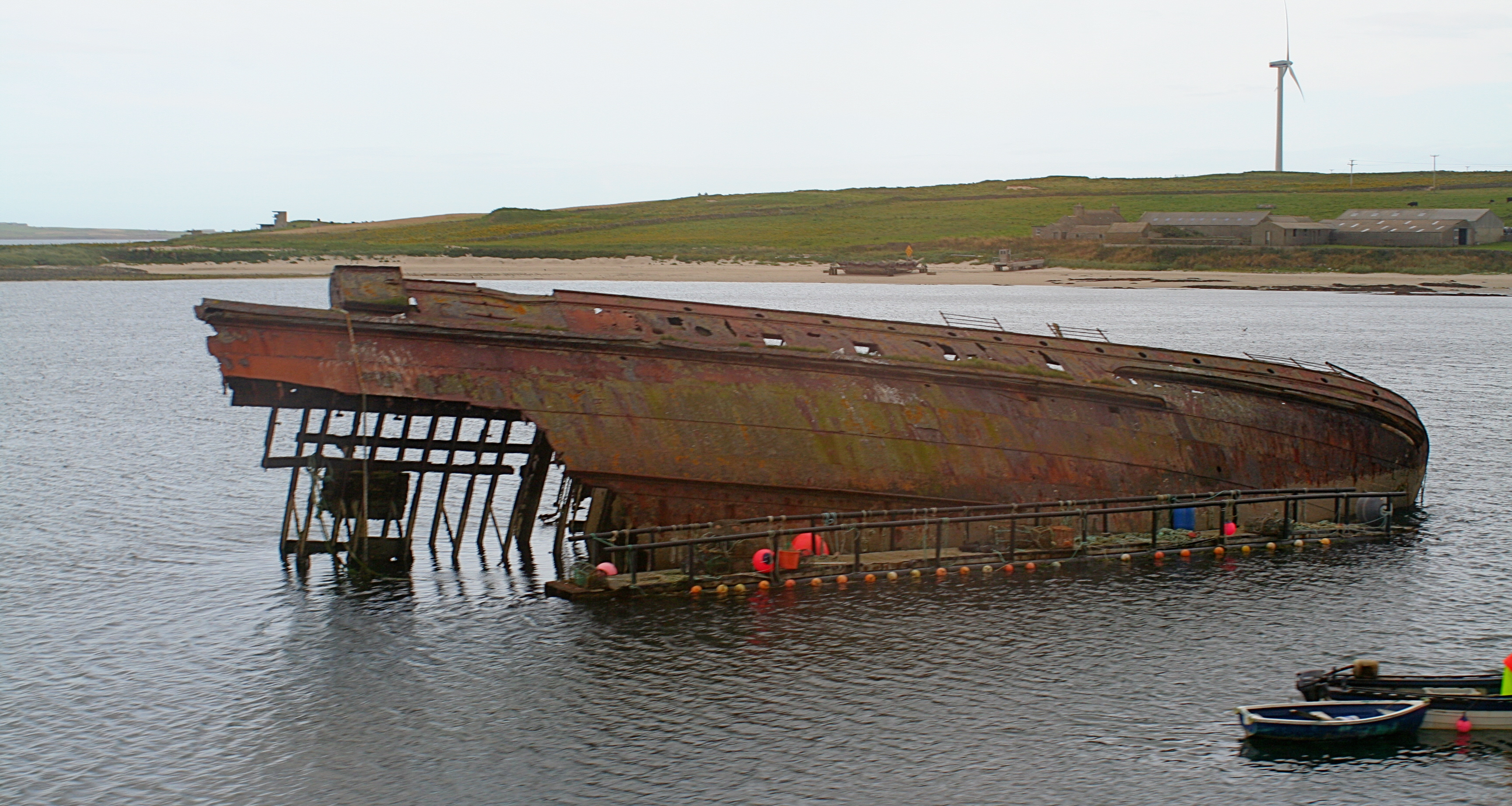
Blockship, Scapa Flow

Primarily because of its great distance from German airfields, Scapa Flow was again selected as the main British naval base during the Second World War.

The strong defences built during the First World War had fallen into disrepair. Defence against air attack was inadequate and blockships sunk to stop U-boats from penetrating had largely collapsed. While there were anti-submarine nets in place over the three main entrances, they were made only of single-stranded looped wire; there was also a severe lack of the patrolling destroyers and other anti-submarine craft that had previously been available. Efforts began belatedly to repair peacetime neglect, but were not completed in time to prevent a successful penetration by enemy forces.

On 14 October 1939, under the command of Günther Prien, U-47 penetrated Scapa Flow and sank the First World War-era battleship HMS Royal Oak anchored in Scapa Bay. After firing its first torpedo salvo, the submarine turned to make its escape; but, upon realising that there was no immediate threat from surface vessels, it returned for another attack. The second torpedo salvo blew a 30-foot (9.1 m) hole in the Royal Oak, which flooded and quickly capsized. Of the 1,400-man crew, 833 were lost. The wreck is now a protected war grave. John Gunther in December 1939 called the attack "the single most extraordinary feat of the war so far".

Three days after the submarine attack, four Luftwaffe Junkers Ju 88 bombers of Kampfgeschwader 1/30 led by group commander Hauptmann Fritz Doench raided Scapa Flow on 17 October in one of the first bombing attacks on Britain during the war. The attack badly damaged an old base ship, the decommissioned battleship HMS Iron Duke, which was then beached at Ore Bay by a tug. One man died and 25 were injured. One of the bombers was shot down by the No. 1 gun of the 226 Heavy Anti-Aircraft Battery on Hoy. Three of the crew died, while the radio operator Fritz Ambrosius was badly burned but managed to parachute down.

New blockships were sunk, booms and mines were placed over the main entrances, coast defence and anti-aircraft batteries were installed at crucial points, and Winston Churchill ordered the construction of a series of causeways to block the eastern approaches to Scapa Flow; they were built by Italian prisoners of war held in Orkney, who also built the Italian Chapel. These "Churchill Barriers" now provide road access from Mainland to Burray and South Ronaldsay, but block maritime traffic. An airfield, RAF Grimsetter (which later became HMS Robin), was built and commissioned in 1940.

=== Post-Second World War ===
==== Petroleum industry ====
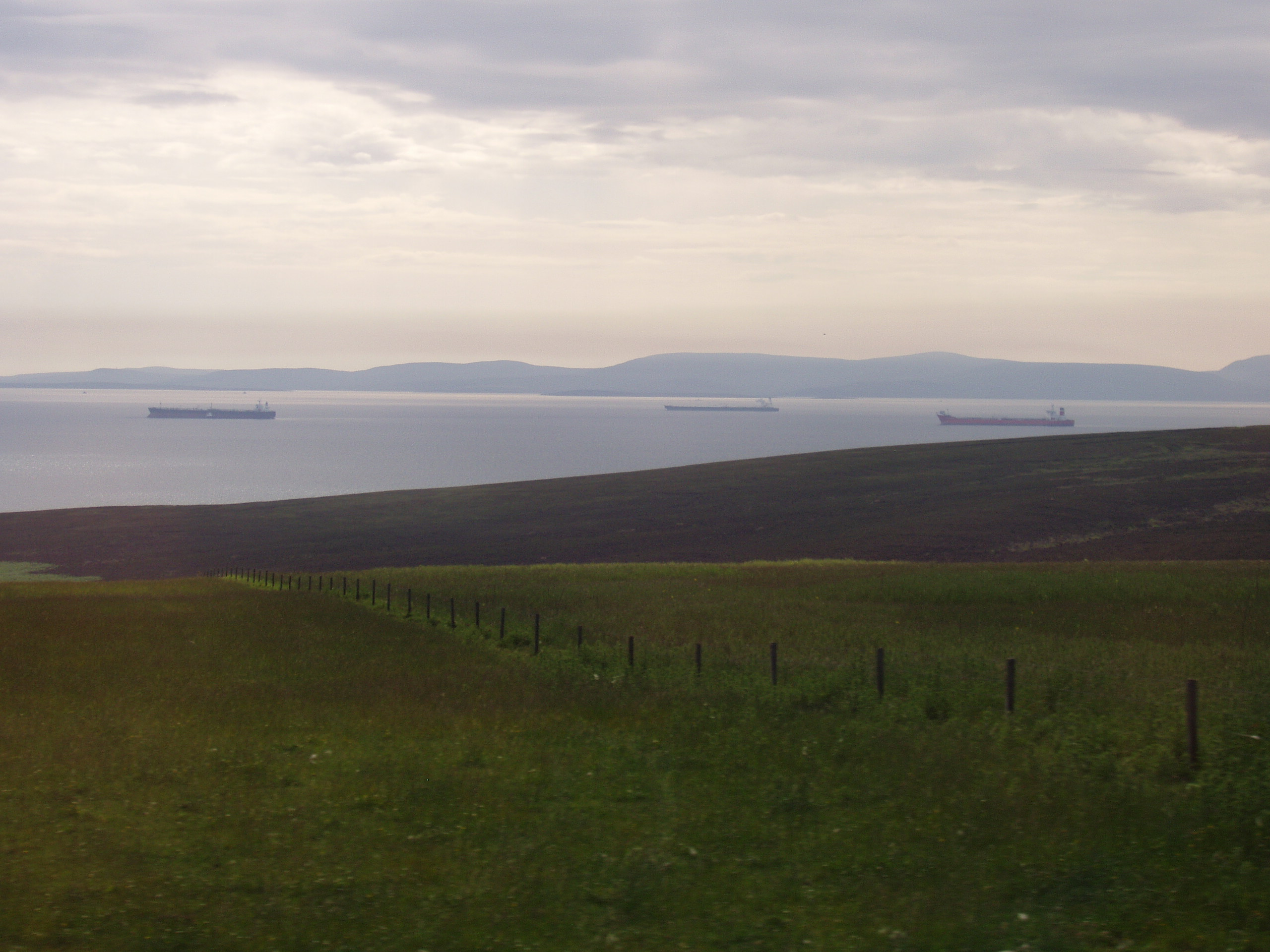
Petroleum tankers wait at anchor in Scapa Flow. The calm waters, relative to the North Sea, provide a safe harbour for the oil terminal at Flotta.

Scapa Flow is one of the transfer and processing points for North Sea oil. An underwater pipeline with a diameter of 30 inches (76 cm) and a length of 128 miles (206 km) transports oil from the Piper oilfield to the Flotta oil terminal. The Claymore and Tartan oil fields (until 2020) also feed into this line.

==== Scapa Flow Visitor Centre ====
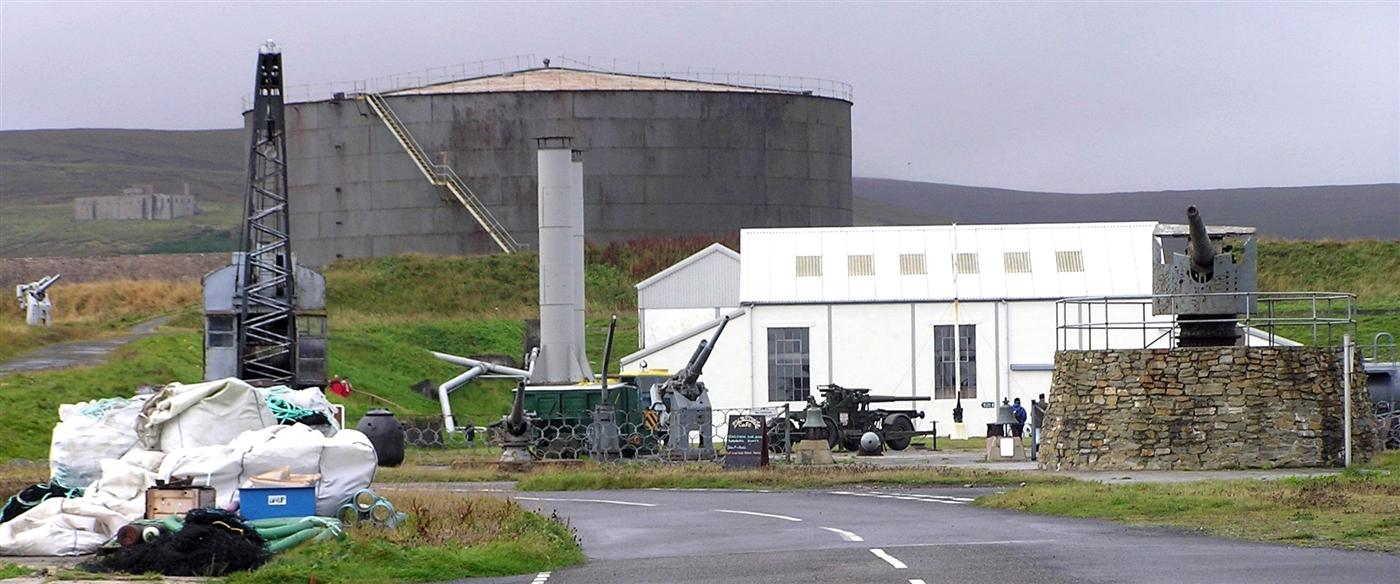
Scapa Flow Visitor Centre, Hoy

The Scapa Flow Visitor Centre is at Lyness on Hoy (from Háey meaning 'high island') the second largest of Orkney. Morning to evening ferries run from Houton on the Mainland.

The Visitor Centre occupies a converted naval fuel pumping station and storage tank and next to it is a round stone-built battery emplacement and artillery gun as well as other decommissioned arsenal. It features a large model of the island, Scapa Flow and of the German warships.

Scapa distillery, a Scotch whisky distillery is located on the shore.

== Scuba diving sites ==
The wreckage of the remaining seven ships of the German fleet (and some other sites such as the blockships) has become increasingly popular as a venue for recreational scuba divers, and is regularly listed in dive magazines and internet forums among the top dive sites in the UK, Europe, and even the world. Although other locations, for example the Pacific regions, offer warmer water and better visibility, there are very few other sites which can offer such an abundance of large, historic wrecks lying in close proximity and shallow, relatively benign diving conditions. As of 2010, at least twelve liveaboard boats—mostly converted trawlers with bunk rooms in their former holds—take recreational divers out to the main sites, primarily from the main harbour at Stromness. Diving provides a substantial amount of trade and income for the local economy.

Divers must first obtain a permit from the Island Harbour Authorities, which is available through diving shops and centres. The wrecks are mostly located at depths of 35 to 50 metres. Divers are permitted to enter the wrecks, but not to retrieve artefacts located within 100 metres of any wreck. However, time and tide has washed broken pieces of ships' pottery and glass bottles into shallow waters and onto beaches. The underwater visibility, which can vary between 2 and 20 metres, is not sufficient to view all the length of most wrecks at once; however, technology has allowed 3D images of them to be seen.

=== German battleships ===
The three sister battleships of the König class (SMS König, SMS Kronprinz and SMS Markgraf) formed the main component of the 3rd Battleship Squadron which took part in fierce fighting at the Battle of Jutland far off the coast of Jutland, Denmark (31 May to 1 June 1916), and their upturned hulls are around 25 m deep. Never raised, they have been salvaged incrementally: armour plate was blasted away and non-ferrous metals were removed. Some of this material may have been obtained for specialized uses because it was not subject to the radiation put into the atmosphere by nuclear weapons, which were exploded in the open air from 1945 to 1963. Thus it was not made more radioactive by nuclear fallout. They also form highly-rated dive sites chiefly due to their depth.

=== German light cruisers ===
The light cruisers SMS Dresden, SMS Karlsruhe, SMS Brummer and SMS Cöln have modest fighting tops, lie side-on with around 16–20 metres of water above, are more accessible for divers and save for the shallowest, Karlsruhe, and are less salvaged (stripped of valuable materials) than the battleships.

=== Other vessels ===
Additional sites of interest include the destroyer SMS V83, which was raised and used by Cox as a working boat during his salvage operations, particularly on SMS Hindenburg, then later abandoned; the Churchill blockships, such as the Tabarka, the Gobernador Bories, and the Doyle in Burra Sound; the U-boat SM UB-116; and the trawler James Barrie. Also, some large items from many of the ship hulls that were raised (such as the main gun turrets, which fell away from the ships as they capsized) were never salvaged, and still rest on the seabed in close proximity to the impact craters gouged by the scuttled ships.

=== War grave wrecks ===
The wrecks of the battleships Royal Oak and Vanguard (the latter of which exploded at anchor during the First World War) are war graves designated as Controlled Sites under the Protection of Military Remains Act 1986—only divers of the British armed forces may visit these wrecks.

== Gallery ==
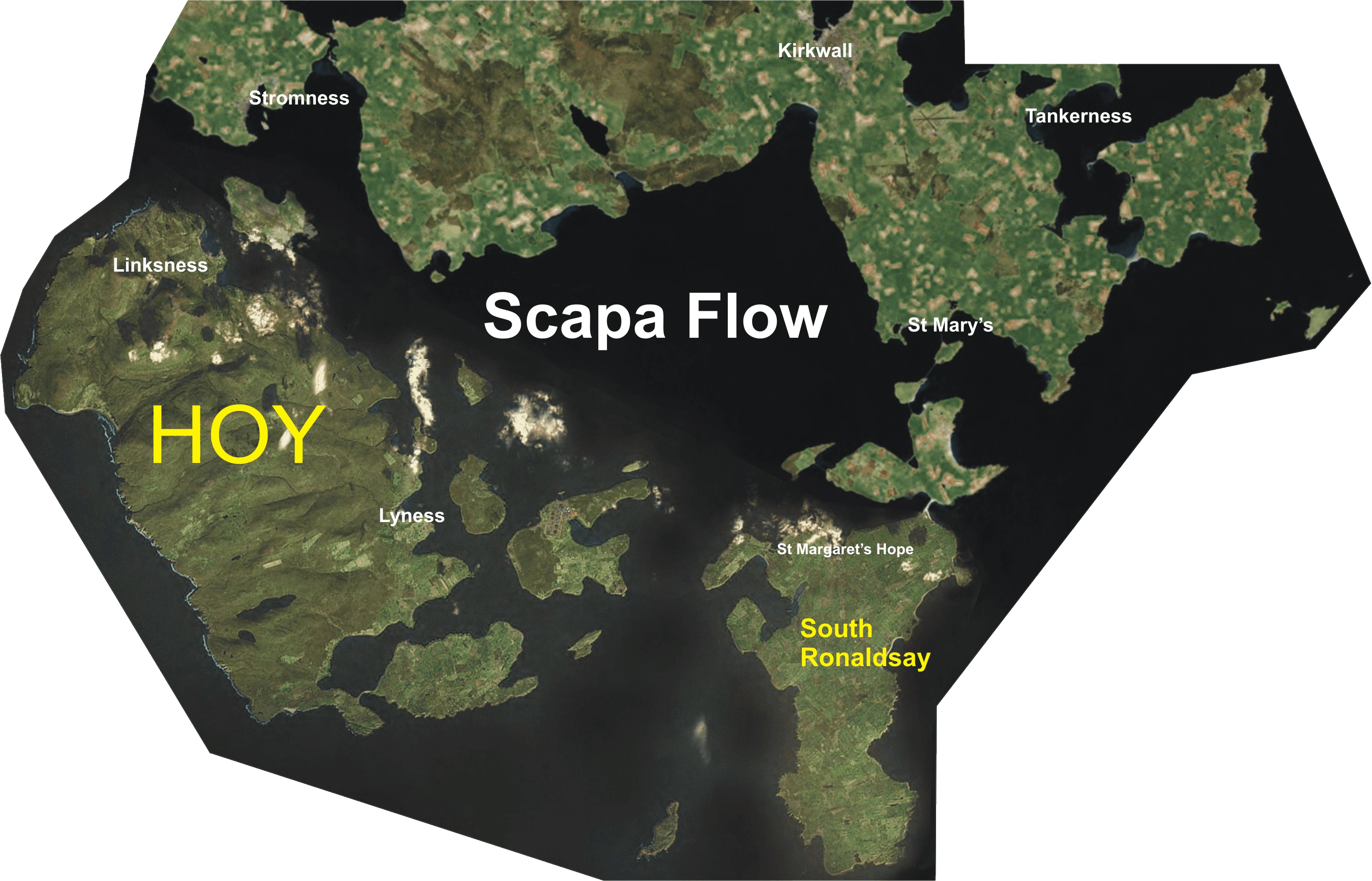
Aerial photograph of Scapa Flow

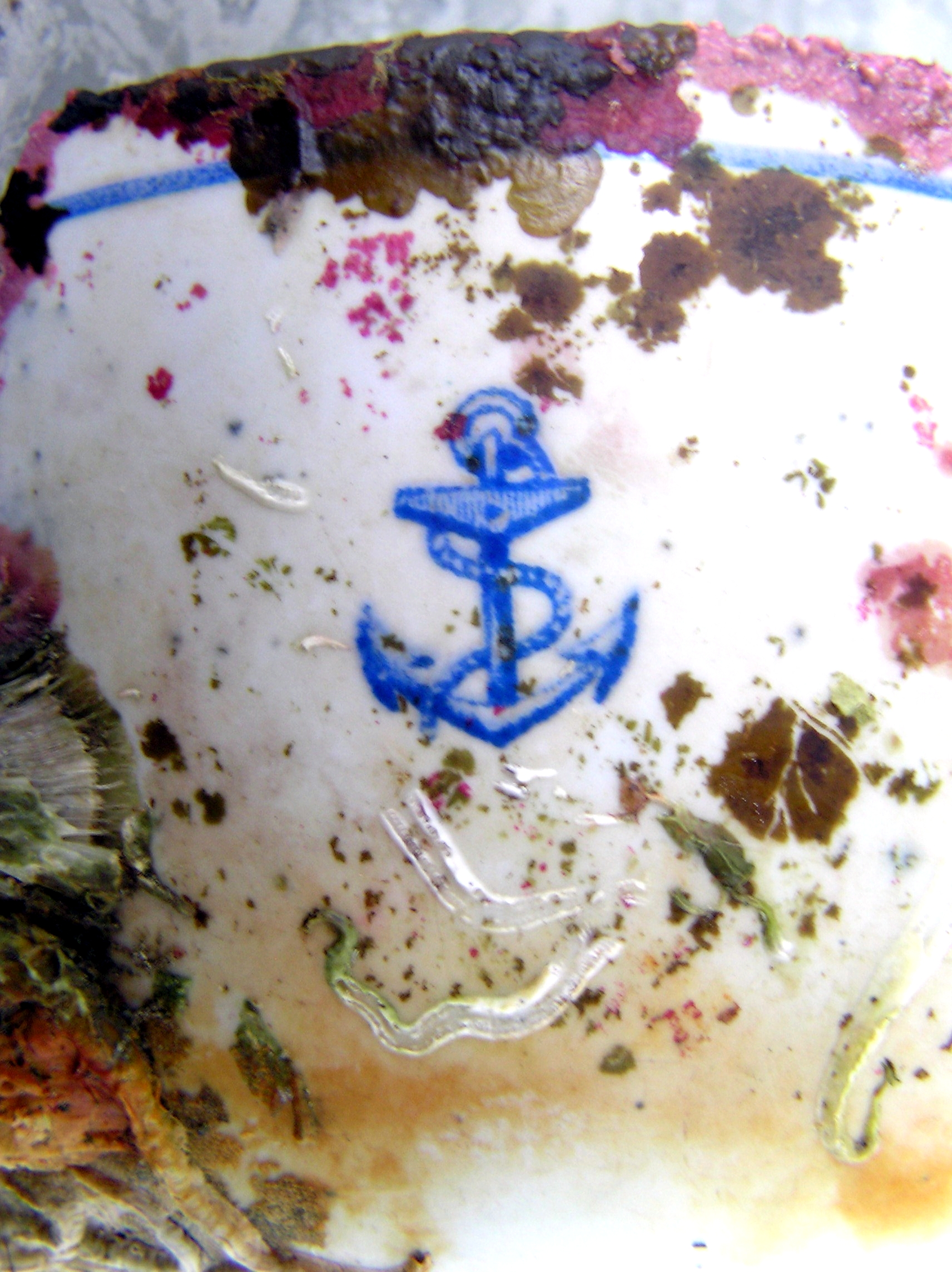
Broken British Navy teacup

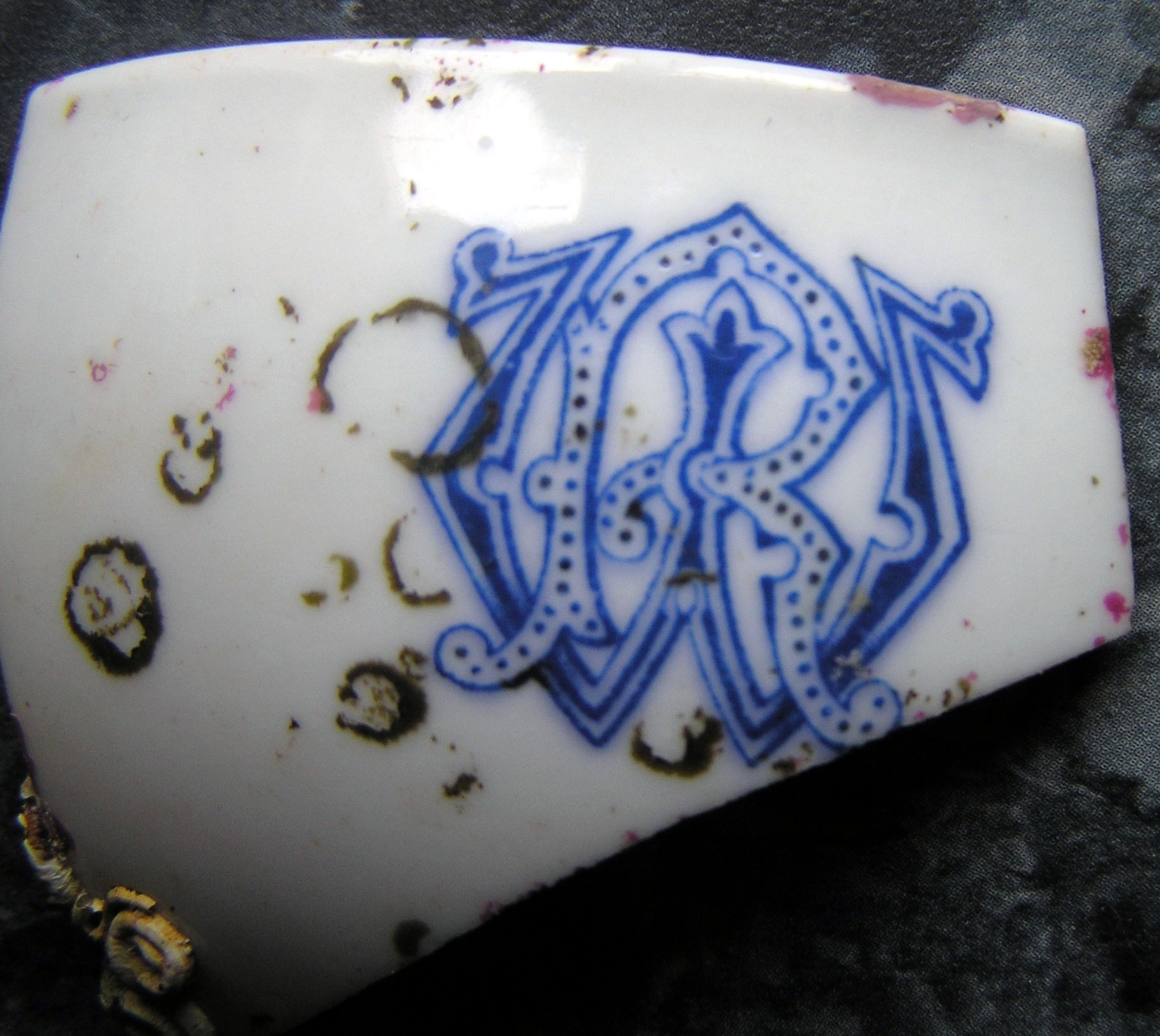
Broken Imperial German Navy teacup with monogram WR ('Wilhelmus Rex', William, King [of Prussia])

== See also ==
- Glimps Holm
- Lamb Holm
- Ness Battery
- List of deepest natural harbours

== References and sources ==
=== Sources ===
- George, S. C. (1981). Jutland to Junkyard. Edinburgh: Paul Harris Publishing. ISBN 0-86228-029-X. Describes the scuttling of the High Seas Fleet.
- Thomson, William P. L. (2008). The New History of Orkney. Edinburgh: Birlinn. ISBN 978-1-84158-696-0.
- Wood, Lawson (2007). Scapa Flow Dive Guide. AquaPress Publishing. ISBN 978-1-905492-04-6. A comprehensive guide to diving the wrecks and reefs of Scapa Flow.
