= Claymore oilfield =

Oilfield on the United Kingdom's continental shelf

Coordinates: 58°27′N 0°15′W

The Claymore oil field is located in Block 14/19 on the United Kingdom's Continental Shelf. It is 161 km (100 mi) northeast of Aberdeen in the Central North Sea. The field is named after a double-edged broadsword used by Highland Scots. Recoverable oil reserves were estimated to be 511 million barrels from an initial oil in place of 1452.9 million barrels. The field was developed through a large steel jacket platform standing in 110 m of water. A separate accommodation platform was installed in 1995. Fluid production was supported by gas lift and significant water injection. The production platform also supports production from the Scapa field, the Golden Eagle field and the Tartan field. Oil is exported to the Flotta terminal.

== History ==
The Claymore field was discovered in 1974 by Occidental of Scotland with well 14/19-2 which penetrated 158 metres of oil sand at a depth of 2,459 metres subsea. The field is subdivided into main, central and northern areas. Production is from Upper Jurassic paralic and turbidite sandstones in the main area, lower Cretaceous turbidite sandstones that overlie faulted Graben margins in the northern area, and Permian carbonates and Carboniferous sandstones in the central area. The oil in place has an API Gravity of 26–33° and a gas oil ratio of 100–400 standard cubic feet per barrel. The sulfur content was 1.8 %.

The topsides for Claymore were designed and procured by Matthew Hall Engineering (MHE) which was awarded the contract in November 1976. MHE was also responsible for construction supervision. The installation was constructed in Cherbourg, France by Union Industrielle et d'Enterprise. Initially there were facilities for 24 oil production wells, ten water injection wells and two gas injection wells. The production capacity was 180,000 barrels of oil per day. There was initially a single production train with three stages of 3-phase (oil, gas and produced water) separation; the first stage separator initially operated at 5.9 barg. Electricity generation was powered by two 12 MW Rolls-Royce Avon gas turbines. The original topside accommodation was for 150 people. The topsides weighed 10,000 tonnes and there were four modules supported by an eight leg steel jacket installed in 1976. MHE was awarded The Queen's Award for Enterprise: Innovation (Technology) in 1980 for the innovative design of production facilities for Claymore A Platform.

== Operation ==
First oil was produced from Claymore in November 1977 and was exported to Flotta Terminal via a 30-inch pipeline. Gas could also be exported (or later imported) to/from the Frigg pipeline system.

The first year of peak production was 1984, when 5.25 million tonnes of oil and 60,000 tonnes of Natural Gas Liquids were produced.

Production of oil (in 1000s barrels)

Two subsea water injection templates were installed in 1981 and 1985.

In 1995 an accommodation platform (designated CAP) was installed, linked to the existing Claymore Production Platform (CPP) by a 106-metre bridge.

As of 2017 Claymore has 32 platform oil production wells; four platform water injection wells; five subsea Scapa oil production wells; and 17 subsea water injection well. Fluids are separated in two horizontal vessels operating in parallel, plus a dedicated Scapa separator. Produced water is treated in hydrocyclones and a degasser vessel prior to overboard disposal. The current capacity of the processing plant, and the ullage available to third party operators, is as follows.

Processing capabilities of Claymore installation (2017)
Plant	Maximum capacity	Maximum capacity (metric)	Ullage
Claymore Separators	180,000 bbl/d	29,000 m^{3}/d	5% to 25%
Scapa Separator	32,000 bbl/d	5,100 m^{3}/d	< 5%
Oil Export system	75,000 bbl/d	11,900 m^{3}/d	> 25%
Claymore Produced Water	180,000 bbl/d	29,000 m^{3}/d	5% to 25%
Scapa Produced Water	45,000 bbl/d	7,200 m^{3}/d	> 25%
Claymore Water Injection	160,000 bbl/d	25,000 m^{3}/d	5% to 25%
Scapa Water Injection	40,000 bbl/d	6,400 m^{3}/d	5% to 25%
Gas Compression system	140,000 million cu ft/d	4,000 million m^{3}/d	> 25%
Gas export system			> 25%
Gas Lift system	140,000 million cu ft/d	4,000 million m^{3}/d	< 5%
Gas dehydration (molecular sieve) for Scapa gas lift	24,000 million cu ft/d	680 million m^{3}/d	< 5%

Claymore provides ‘up and over’ transportation facilities for the Golden Eagle field (first oil was in November 2014).

== Scapa oil field ==
The Scapa oil field is located in Block 14/19 on the United Kingdom Continental Shelf. It is about 4.5 km southwest of the Claymore installation. It is named after Scapa Flow a body of water and natural harbour in the Orkney Islands. The field was discovered in 1975 by well 14/19-9 in the Scapa sandstone measure of the Early Cretaceous Valhal Formation. Oil in place was estimated to be 206 million barrels and recoverable reserves to be 65 million barrels. Field development was authorised in 1982, this was developed as a subsea tie-in to Claymore. Production commenced in 1986 using an existing platform well plus an eight slot subsea template (including water injection wells). There are five subsea Scapa oil production wells. The well fluids are transported to the Claymore CPP platform where oil, gas and produced water separation is undertaken in a dedicated production separator with fluids then co-mingled with Claymore fluids.

== Ownership ==
Occidental of Scotland were the original licensee and operator of the Claymore field and installation. Occidental sold much of its North Sea interest including Claymore to Elf Aquitaine in May 1991. Elf sold the Piper, Claymore and Saltire platforms in 1999. Talisman Energy acquired a major stake in the Claymore field in 2000 and again in 2004. In 2014 Talisman announced that its board of directors had approved a transaction relating to the acquisition of Talisman by Repsol. The Claymore installation is currently (2018) owned and operated by Repsol Sinopec Resources UK.

== See also ==
- Energy policy of the United Kingdom
- Energy use and conservation in the United Kingdom
