= Tartan oil field =

Decommissioned oil field

- Location within North Sea
- Country: United Kingdom
- Region: North Sea
- Location/blocks: 15/16a and 14/20a
- Offshore/onshore: Offshore
- Coordinates: 58°22′11″N 00°04′25″E
- Operators: Repsol Resources UK
- Owner: Repsol Resources UK

Field history
- Discovery: February 1975
- Start of production: January 1981
- Abandonment: 2020

Production
- Estimated oil in place: 14.1 million tonnes (~ 12.8×10^{6} m^{3} or 80.5 million bbl)
- Recoverable oil: 62 million barrels (~1.1×10^{7} t)
- Producing formations: Upper Jurassic sandstone

The Tartan oil field is a significant crude oil producing field in the UK sector of the North Sea, 187 km north-east of Aberdeen. Production of oil started in 1981 and ceased in 2020, the Tartan Alpha installation is currently (2021) undergoing decommissioning.

== The field ==
The Tartan oil field is located in Blocks 15/16a and 14/20a of the UK North Sea continental shelf. Its name continues the Scottish theme of oil fields in the area (eg Claymore, Piper, Scott). The Tartan field was discovered in February 1975 and the oil reservoir comprises an Upper Jurassic sandstone at a depth of 9,800 to 12,000 feet (2,9873 to 3,658 metres). The reservoir and its fluids had the following characteristics:

Tartan reservoir and fluids
Parameter	Value
Porosity	8–18 %
Permeability	70–500 md %
API gravity	37–40°API
Gas Oil Ratio	900 standard cubic feet/barrel
Sulfur content	0.7 %
Pressure/temperature	4,600–5,700 psi (31,715–39,300 kPa) at 220–240 °F
Recoverable reserves	62 million barrels, 14.1 million tonnes

== Owners and operators ==
The initial owner of the field was Texaco North Sea Limited which also operated the field. Talisman assumed ownership in 2000. The company became Talisman Sinopec Energy, then Repsol Sinopec.

== Development ==
The field was developed by a single integrated drilling, production and accommodation platform: Tartan Alpha (Tartan A). The principal design data of the Tartan A platform is given in the following table.

Tartan A platform design data
Installation	Tartan A
Coordinates	58°22’11”N 00°04’25”E
Water depth, metres	142
Fabrication substructure	McDermott-Hudson, Cherbourg and Methil
Jacket weight, tonnes	14,400
Topsides design	Lawrence Allison
Topsides weight, tonnes	14,100
Function	Drilling, production, accommodation
Accommodation (crew)	200
Type	Steel jacket
Legs	4
Piles	28
Well slots	30
Throughput oil, barrels per day (bpd)	75,000 + 14,400 Natural Gas Liquids
Water injection, bpd	105,000
Platform installed	June 1979
Production started	January 1981
Oil production to	Claymore
Gas production to	Frigg pipeline

Tartan Alpha was originally connected to the Piper Alpha platform through a 19 km 18-inch diameter gas pipeline. The failure of the riser of this pipeline at about 22:20 6 July 1988 during the Piper Alpha disaster led to a second major explosion followed by a widespread fire.

Production from Tartan's faulted reservoir was 'disappointing'. Texaco therefore halted production well drilling on Tartan and focussed on the Highlander field, about 13 km north-west of Tartan, to enable the field to produce through Tartan.

=== Tartan satellites ===
In addition to its own production several other smaller fields were tied back to Tartan. The design data is summarized below.

Name of field	Highlander	Petronella	Galley	Duart	Tartan North Terrace
Year installed	1985	1986	1998	2007	2004
Distance from Tartan, km	13	11	14		3.4
Production pipeline, inches	12	8	10	8	6
Gas lift pipeline, inches	8	12	–	–	3
Water injection pipeline, inches	4	–	8	–	–
No. of Wells		1		1	1

Production from the Galley field was originally through the Northern Producer a floating production facility.

== Processing ==
Oil from the wellheads and subsea tie-ins was routed to one of five 1st stage 3-phase (oil, gas, water) separators. Oil flowed from the 1st stage separators to the single 2nd stage separator and from there was pumped through metering streams to the 27 km 24-inch diameter oil export pipeline to Claymore.

Produced water from the separators was treated in a degassing vessel and hydrocyclones to an oil-in-water concentration of less than 30 mg/litre prior to discharge overboard.

Gas from the separators was compressed in the single 5 stage compression train. Gas was treated to remove hydrogen sulfide. Some gas was used to provide lift gas for the wells and the remainder was exported via a 72 km 18-inch pipeline to the Frigg MCP01 bypass line, and thence to St. Fergus.

By 2017 there were 5 Tartan production wells and 1 subsea injection well.

The fluid handling capability of the Tartan facilities in its latter years of operation was as follows:

Treatment facility	Capacity
Crude oil	30,000 bbls/day
Gas compression	40-66 MMSCFD (million standard cubic feet per day)
Dehydration	70 MMSCFD
Gas sweetening	70 MMSCFD

== Decommissioning ==
Repsol Sinopec were granted a Cessation of Production authorisation by the UK Oil and Gas Authority in August 2020. Repsol Sinopec have submitted decommissioning plans to the Oil and Gas Authority, and are undertaking decommissioning of the Tartan installation and its associated infrastructure.
